= Wilco discography =

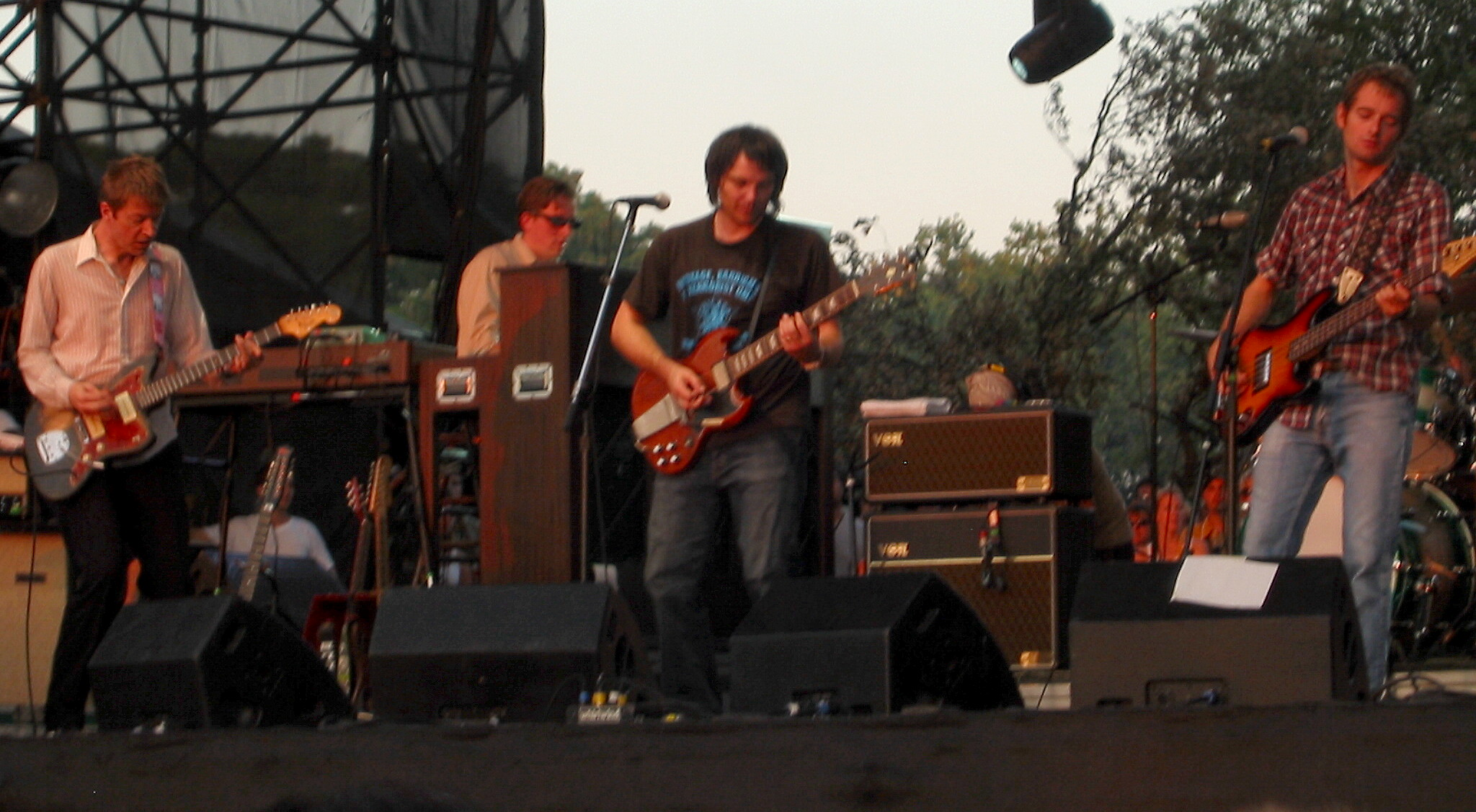
Wilco performing at the Austin City Limits Festival in September 2004

The discography of the American alternative rock group Wilco, consists of thirteen studio albums, five extended plays (EPs), three live albums, twelve singles and four videos. As of 2012 they had sold in excess of two million albums worldwide.

Following the breakup of Uncle Tupelo, the band's first three studio albums were released on Reprise Records. During recording for the band's fourth album, Yankee Hotel Foxtrot, Reprise dropped the band from the label, causing outcry from media outlets such as the Chicago Tribune. The band signed with fellow Warner Bros. Records subsidiary Nonesuch Records in 2002. After the Nonesuch deal ended with 2009's Wilco (The Album), the band launched their own label, dBpm Records. Wilco recorded two albums of Woody Guthrie songs with Billy Bragg, and performed as a session band for The Minus 5 on their Down with Wilco album. Yankee Hotel Foxtrot was the most successful album for the band, earning a Gold certification by the Recording Industry Association of America (RIAA).

== Albums ==
=== Studio albums ===
| Year | Details | Peak chart positions | | | | | | | | | | | Sales and certifications |
| Year | Details | US | AUS | BEL (FL) | FRA | GER | IRL | NED | NOR | NZ | SWE | UK | Sales and certifications |
|---|---|---|---|---|---|---|---|---|---|---|---|---|---|
| 1995 | A.M.: Released: March 28, 1995; Label: Reprise; Formats: CD, vinyl | — (Note: A.M. did not enter the US Billboard 200, but peaked at number 27 on the US Heatseekers Albums Chart.) | — | — | — | — | — | — | — | — | — | — | US: 217,000 |
| 1996 | Being There: Released: October 29, 1996; Label: Reprise; Formats: CD, vinyl | 73 | — | — | — | — | — | — | — | — | — | 132 | US: 398,000; Canada: Gold |
| 1999 | Summerteeth: Released: March 9, 1999; Label: Reprise; Formats: CD, vinyl | 78 | 63 | 197 | — | — | — | — | 5 | — | 51 | 38 | US: 279,000 |
| 2001 | Yankee Hotel Foxtrot: Released: September 18, 2001; Label: Self-released, Nonesuch; Formats: download, CD, vinyl | 13 | 43 | 89 | 124 | 29 | 32 | — | 4 | — | 24 | 40 | US: 674,000+; US: Gold |
| 2004 | A Ghost Is Born: Released: June 22, 2004; Label: Nonesuch; Formats: CD, vinyl, download | 8 | 43 | 34 | 186 | 41 | 37 | 94 | 24 | 33 | 29 | 50 | US: 348,000 |
| 2007 | Sky Blue Sky: Released: May 15, 2007; Label: Nonesuch; Formats: CD, vinyl, download | 4 | 23 | 16 | 131 | 36 | 23 | 51 | 7 | 32 | 26 | 39 | US: 389,000 |
| 2009 | Wilco (The Album): Released: June 30, 2009; Label: Nonesuch; Formats: CD, vinyl, download | 4 | 47 | 25 | 133 | 32 | 27 | 50 | 12 | 17 | 31 | 49 | US: 299,000 |
| 2011 | The Whole Love: Released: September 27, 2011; Label: dBpm; Formats: CD, vinyl, download | 5 | 23 | 12 | 82 | 14 | 23 | 16 | 10 | 9 | 16 | 30 | US: 82,000 |
| 2015 | Star Wars: Released: July 16, 2015; Label: dBpm; Formats: Download, CD, vinyl | 105 | 60 | 46 | — | 83 | 69 | 14 | — | 30 | — | 83 | |
| 2016 | Schmilco: Released: September 9, 2016; Label: dBpm; Formats: Download, CD, vinyl | 11 | 16 | 10 | 90 | 21 | 18 | 9 | 16 | 14 | 46 | 25 | |
| 2019 | Ode to Joy: Released: October 4, 2019; Label: dBpm; Formats: Download, CD, vinyl | 21 | 23 | 20 | 193 | 25 | 28 | 24 | — | — | — | 29 | |
| 2022 | Cruel Country: Released: May 27, 2022; Label: dBpm; Formats: CD, download, vinyl | 190 | — | 36 | — | 82 | — | 42 | — | — | — | — | |
| 2023 | Cousin: Released: September 29, 2023; Label: dBpm; Formats: CD, download, vinyl | 65 | 60 | 25 | 189 | 21 | 51 | 36 | — | — | — | 65 | |
"—" denotes releases that did not chart or were not released in that region.

=== Live albums ===
| Year | Details | Peak chart positions | | Sales |
| Year | Details | US | UK | Sales |
|---|---|---|---|---|
| 2005 | Kicking Television: Live in Chicago: Released: November 15, 2005; Label: Nonesuch; Formats: CD, vinyl, download | 47 | 163 | US: 114,000 |
| 2025 | Wilco Live (Orange): Released: May 16, 2025; Label: dBpm; Formats: download | — | — | |
| 2025 | Wilco Live (Blue): Released: June 20, 2025; Label: dBpm; Formats: download | — | — | |

=== Collaborations ===
| Year | Details | Peak chart positions | | |
| Year | Details | US | AUS | UK |
|---|---|---|---|---|
| 1998 | Mermaid Avenue (with Billy Bragg): Released: June 23, 1998; Label: Elektra; Formats: CD, vinyl; Sales: 330,000 | 90 | 12 | 34 |
| 2000 | Mermaid Avenue Vol. II (with Billy Bragg): Released: May 30, 2000; Label: Elektra; Formats: CD, vinyl; Sales: 156,000 | 88 | 45 | 61 |
| 2003 | Down with Wilco (by The Minus 5): Released: February 25, 2003; Label: Yep Roc; Formats: CD, vinyl, download | — | — | — |
| 2009 | The Sun Came Out (by 7 Worlds Collide): Released: September 29, 2009; Label: Columbia, EMI; Formats: CD, vinyl, download | — | — | — |
| 2012 | Mermaid Avenue: The Complete Sessions (with Billy Bragg): Released: April 21, 2012; Label: Nonesuch; Formats: CD, download | — | — | — |
"—" denotes releases that did not chart or were not released in that region.

== EPs ==
| Year | Details | Comments |
|---|---|---|
| 1997 | All Over the Place: Released: December 1997; Label: Formats: 10" vinyl | Promo-only release. |
| 2003 | More Like the Moon: Released: April 23, 2003; Label: Nonesuch; Formats: CD, download | Also known as Australian EP and Bridge EP. Free download with purchase of Yankee Hotel Foxtrot. |
| 2004 | The Wilco Book: Released: November 2, 2004; Label: Nonesuch; Formats: CD | Demos, outtakes and experimental tracks from A Ghost Is Born sessions, included with The Wilco Book. |
| 2005 | A Ghost Is Born (bonus EP): Released: 2005; Label: Nonesuch; Formats: CD, download | Also known as Panthers EP. Free download for purchase of A Ghost Is Born. |
| 2007 | Sky Blue Sky (bonus EP): Released: May 15, 2007; Label: Nonesuch; Formats: CD | Originally only available with purchase of Sky Blue Sky at independent record stores. Re-issued during the European segment of the Sky Blue Sky tour with bonus tracks. |
| 2012 | iTunes Session: Released: January 24, 2012; Label: dBpm; Formats: Download | Available only at the iTunes Store. Includes new recordings of seven previously released songs plus a recording of "Cruel to Be Kind" with Nick Lowe on lead vocals. |
| 2024 | Hot Sun Cool Shroud: Released: June 28, 2024; Label: dBpm; Formats: CD, vinyl, download | |

== Singles ==
| Year | Song | Peak chart positions | | | | | | | | | Album |
| Year | Song | US Sales | US AAA | US Main | US Rock | BEL (FL) | JPN | MEX Air. | SCO | UK | Album |
|---|---|---|---|---|---|---|---|---|---|---|---|
| 1995 | "Box Full of Letters" | — | — | — | — | — | — | — | — | — | A.M. |
| 1997 | "Outtasite (Outta Mind)" | — | 16 | 22 | — (Note: "Outtasite (Outta Mind)" did not enter the Hot Rock & Alternative Songs chart, but peaked at number 39 on the Alternative Airplay chart.) | — | — | — | 92 | 97 | Being There |
| 1999 | "Can't Stand It" | — | 4 | — | — (Note: "Can't Stand It" did not enter the Hot Rock & Alternative Songs chart, but peaked at number 26 on the Heritage Rock chart.) | — | — | — | 68 | 67 | Summerteeth |
| 1999 | "A Shot in the Arm" | — | — | — | — | — | — | — | 80 | 88 | Summerteeth |
| 2000 | "Secret of the Sea" | — | 14 | — | — | — | — | — | — | — | Mermaid Avenue Vol. II |
| 2002 | "Heavy Metal Drummer" | — | 24 | — | — | — | — | — | — | — | Yankee Hotel Foxtrot |
| 2002 | "War on War" | — | — | — | — | — | — | — | — | 115 | Yankee Hotel Foxtrot |
| 2004 | "I'm a Wheel" | — | 23 | — | — | — | — | — | 66 | 85 | A Ghost Is Born |
| 2004 | "Theologians" | — | 14 | — | — | — | — | — | — | — | A Ghost Is Born |
| 2007 | "What Light" | — | 7 | — | — | — | — | — | 84 | — (Note: "What Light" did not enter the UK Singles Chart, but peaked at number 65 on the UK Physical Singles Chart Top 100.) | Sky Blue Sky |
| 2009 | "You Never Know" | — | 1 | — | 40 | — | — | — | — | — | Wilco (The Album) |
| 2009 | "You and I" | — | 25 | — | — | — | — | — | — | — | Wilco (The Album) |
| 2011 | "I Might" | 5 | 9 | — | — | — | 91 | 30 | — | — (Note: "I Might" did not enter the UK Singles Chart, but peaked at number 15 on the UK Physical Singles Chart Top 100.) | The Whole Love |
| 2011 | "Speak Into the Rose" | 4 | — | — | — | — | — | — | — | — | The Whole Love |
| 2012 | "Dawned on Me" | — | 25 | — | — | 137 | — | — | — | — | The Whole Love |
| 2015 | "Random Name Generator" | 9 | 20 | — | — | — | — | 38 | — | — (Note: "Random Name Generator" did not enter the UK Singles Chart, but peaked at number 20 on the UK Physical Singles Chart.) | Star Wars |
| 2016 | "Locator" | — | — | — | — | — | — | 38 | — | — | Schmilco |
| 2016 | "If I Ever Was a Child" | — | 17 | — | — | — (Note: "If I Ever Was a Child" did not enter the Flanders Ultratop Top 50, but charted as an extra tip on the Flanders Ultratop Bubbling Under chart.) | — | — | — | — | Schmilco |
| 2019 | "Love Is Everywhere (Beware)" | — | 16 | — | — | — (Note: "Love Is Everywhere (Beware)" did not enter the Flanders Ultratop Top 50, but charted as an extra tip on the Flanders Ultratop Bubbling Under chart.) | — | 47 | — | — | Ode to Joy |
| 2019 | "Everyone Hides" | — | 16 | — | — | — | — | — | — | — | Ode to Joy |
| 2021 | "Modern Girl" | — | — | — | — | — | — | — | — | — | Non-album singles |
| 2021 | "Half Life" b/w "I Can't" | — | — | — | — | — | — | — | — | — | Non-album singles |
| 2021 | "Dig a Pony" | — | — | — | — | — | — | — | — | — | Non-album singles |
| 2021 | "Don't Let Me Down" | — | — | — | — | — | — | — | — | — | Non-album singles |
| 2022 | "Falling Apart (Right Now)" | — | 19 | — | — | — | — | — | — | — | Cruel Country |
| 2022 | "Tired of Taking It Out on You" | — | — | — | — | — | — | — | — | — | Cruel Country |
| 2023 | "Evicted" | — | 3 | — | — (Note: "Evicted" did not enter the Hot Rock & Alternative Songs chart, but peaked at number 46 on the Rock Airplay chart.) | — | — | — | — | — | Cousin |
| 2023 | "Meant to Be" | — | 18 | — | — | — | — | — | — | — | Cousin |
"—" denotes releases that did not chart or were not released in that region.

== Compilations ==
| Year | Album | Comments |
|---|---|---|
| 2014 | What's Your 20? Essential Tracks 1994–2014 | First 'best of' two-disc compilation released to celebrate their 20 years. |
| 2014 | Alpha Mike Foxtrot: Rare Tracks 1994–2014 | 4CD box set of rarities and outtakes, many of them detailed below. |
| 2023 | Crosseyed Strangers: An Alternate Yankee Hotel Foxtrot | Record Store Day release of various alternate and live versions of songs from Yankee Hotel Foxtrot |

== Miscellaneous ==
These songs have not appeared on an official album by Wilco, but several have appeared on their Alpha Mike Foxtrot: Rare Tracks 1994 - 2014 rarities collection. The song "The T.B. Is Whipping Me" with Syd Straw was the first-ever release by Wilco.

| Year | Song | Album | Comments |
|---|---|---|---|
| 1994 | "The T.B. Is Whipping Me" | Red Hot + Country | with Syd Straw; cover of the Ernest Tubb song |
| 1995 | "Childlike and Evergreen" | Soil Samples 7" | Split promo single with Poster Children |
| 1996 | "Burned" | I Shot Andy Warhol soundtrack | Cover of the 1966 Buffalo Springfield song. |
| 1996 | "Blasting Fonda" | Feeling Minnesota soundtrack | later released on Summerteeth bonus disc |
| 1997 | "Promising" | All Over the Place 10" Promo, Chelsea Walls soundtrack | Recorded at Easley Studios, Memphis, 1994 |
| 1997 | "Don't You Honey Me" | All Over the Place 10" Promo | Recorded at the Warzone, Chicago, 1996 |
| 1999 | "100 Years From Now" | Return of the Grievous Angel: A Tribute to Gram Parsons | Cover of the 1968 The Byrds song. |
| 2000 | "Any Major Dude Will Tell You" | Me, Myself & Irene soundtrack | Cover of the 1974 Steely Dan song. |
| 2002 | "Cars Can't Escape" | Offered as a free Wilcoworld.net Roadcase download for owners of Yankee Hotel Foxtrot | |
| 2002 | "When the Roses Bloom Again" | Chelsea Walls soundtrack | From the Mermaid Avenue sessions, has been covered by Sally Timms and Laura Cantrell |
| 2003 | "Old Maid" | You Can Never Go Fast Enough: a tribute album to the film Two-Lane Blacktop. | |
| 2003 | "Let Me Come Home" | Amos House Collection, Vol. 3, a charity album for the Amos House. | |
| 2004 | "Just a Kid" | The SpongeBob SquarePants Movie – Music from the Movie and More... | Co-written by Jeff & Spencer Tweedy |
| 2006 | "Thirteen" | Big Star, Small World | Big Star tribute album |
| 2006 | "James Alley Blues" | The Harry Smith Project: The Anthology Of American Folk Music Revisited | Live recording |
| 2007 | "Let's Not Get Carried Away" | iTunes version of Sky Blue Sky | |
| 2007 | "The Thanks I Get" | Available as free download to owners of Sky Blue Sky | Used in a Volkswagen commercial. |
| 2007 | "One True Vine" | Sky Blue Sky Bonus EP | |
| 2008 | "Glad It's Over" | Heroes (U.S. TV series) Original TV Soundtrack | Outtake from Sky Blue Sky recording sessions |
| 2008 | "I Shall Be Released" | Offered as a free download to fans who promised to vote in the 2008 United States presidential election. | Recorded live with the Fleet Foxes. Cover of the 1967 Bob Dylan song. |
| 2009 | "The Jolly Banker" | Available for download with a suggested donation of two dollars towards the Woody Guthrie Foundation and Archives. | Cover of the 1940 Woody Guthrie song. Feist is credited with providing percussion. |
| 2009 | "Dark Neon" | Available with iTunes pre-orders of Wilco (the Album) | |

== Videography ==
| Year | DVD | Comments |
|---|---|---|
| 1999 | Man in the Sand | Documentary about the making of Mermaid Avenue. |
| 2002 | I Am Trying to Break Your Heart: A Film About Wilco | Black-and-white documentary directed by Sam Jones, following the production of Yankee Hotel Foxtrot. |
| 2007 | Shake It Off | Performance DVD included with purchase of the special edition of Sky Blue Sky. |
| 2009 | Ashes of American Flags | Live concert DVD filmed February 2008; released on Record Store Day, April 18, 2009. |

== See also ==
- Jeff Tweedy discography
- Uncle Tupelo discography
