= Jeff Tweedy discography =

The Jeff Tweedy discography covers albums that he has recorded with Uncle Tupelo, Wilco, solo albums, and various side projects.

== Discography ==
=== Solo albums ===
Year	Title	Label
2017	Together at Last	dBpm Records
2018	Warm	dBpm Records
2019	Warmer	dBpm Records
2020	Love Is the King	dBpm Records
2025	Twilight Override	dBpm Records

=== Soundtracks ===
Year	Title	Label
2002	Chelsea Walls	Rykodisc Records

=== Singles ===
Title	Year	Peak chart positions		Album
Title	Year	US Airplay	US AAA	Album
2018	"Some Birds"	—	—	Warm
2018	"Let's Go Rain"	—	—	Warm
2018	"I Know What It's Like"	—	20	Warm
2019	"Family Ghost"	—	—	Warmer
2021	"C'Mon America"/"UR-60 Unsent"	—	—	Non-album single
2025	"One Tiny Flower"	—	—	Twilight Override
2025	"Out in the Dark"	—	—	Twilight Override
2025	"Stray Cats in Spain"	—	—	Twilight Override
2025	"Enough"	39	2	Twilight Override
2025	"Feel Free"	—	—	Twilight Override
2025	"Lou Reed Was My Babysitter"	48	14	Twilight Override

=== Other appearances ===
Year	Song(s)	Title	Label
2004	"Take This Job and Shove It" (Johnny Paycheck cover)	Touch My Heart: A Tribute to Johnny Paycheck	Sugarhill Records
2005	"Crack a Smile" (Jandek cover)	Down in a Mirror: A Second Tribute to Jandek	Summersteps Records
2007	"Simple Twist of Fate" (Bob Dylan cover): vocals, guitar, bass	I'm Not There (soundtrack)	Columbia Records
2013	"The Ballad of the Opening Band" (Slim Dunlap cover): vocals, guitar	Songs For Slim: Rockin Here Tonight - A Benefit Compilation For Slim Dunlap	New West
2021	"For You (I'd Do Anything"	May the Circle Remain Unbroken: A Tribute to Roky Erickson	Light in the Attic
2022	"Bell Minor"	For the Birds: Vol. II	

== Session work ==
=== Albums ===
Year	Title	Label	Notes
2003	Circles	Arena Rock Recording Co.	with The Autumn Defense
2004	Arabella	Broadmoor Records	with Laurie & John
2017	If All I Was Was Black	ANTI- Records	with Mavis Staples

=== Appearances ===
Year	Artist	Title	Label	Contribution
1991	Michelle Shocked	Arkansas Traveler	Mercury Records	Bass guitar, background vocals
1993	The Bottle Rockets	The Bottle Rockets	East Side Digital Records	Background vocals
1996	Dazzling Killmen	Recuerda	Skin Graft Records	Guitar, engineer
1998	Jim Cuddy	All in Time	Warner Bros. Records	Guitar, background vocals
1998	Tommy Keene	Isolation Party	Matador Records	Background vocals
1998	The Handsome Family	Through the Trees	Carrot Top Records	Guitar, background vocals
2001	Boxhead Ensemble	Two Brothers	Atavistic Records	Guitar
2003	The Minus 5	I Don't Know Who I Am (Let the War Against Music Begin, Vol. 2)	Return to Sender Records	Musician
2004	Preston School of Industry	Monsoon	Matador Records	Guitar
2009	Rosanne Cash	The List	Manhattan Records	"Long Black Veil" (Danny Dill, Marijohn Wilkin cover): Background vocals
2016	Parquet Courts	Human Performance	Rough Trade Records	"Dust", "Keep It Even": Guitar

== Videography ==
Year	Title
1999	Man in the Sand
2002	I Am Trying to Break Your Heart
2006	Sunken Treasure: Live in the Pacific Northwest
2009	Ashes of American Flags
2015	Every Other Summer

== Music videos ==
Year	Song	Director(s)
2018	"Some Birds"	Seth Henrikson
2018	"I Know What It's Like"	Mark Greenberg
2025	"One Tiny Flower"	Mark Greenberg
2025	"Out In the Dark"	Mark Greenberg
2025	"Lou Reed Was My Babysitter"	Austin Vesely

== Band work ==
=== Uncle Tupelo ===
Year	Title	Label
1990	No Depression	Rockville Records
1991	Still Feel Gone	Rockville Records
1992	March 16–20, 1992	Rockville Records
1993	Anodyne	Sire Records

=== Wilco ===
Year	Title	Label
1995	A.M.	Reprise Records
1996	Being There	Reprise Records
1998	Mermaid Avenue ^{(Billy Bragg & Wilco)}	Elektra Records
1999	Summerteeth	Reprise Records
2000	Mermaid Avenue Vol. II ^{(Billy Bragg & Wilco)}	Elektra Records
2002	Yankee Hotel Foxtrot	Nonesuch Records
2003	More Like the Moon EP	Nonesuch Records
2004	A Ghost Is Born	Nonesuch Records
2005	Kicking Television: Live in Chicago	Nonesuch Records
2007	Sky Blue Sky	Nonesuch Records
2009	Wilco (The Album)	Nonesuch Records
2011	The Whole Love	dBpm Records
2015	Star Wars	dBpm Records
2016	Schmilco	dBpm Records
2019	Ode to Joy	dBpm Records
2022	Cruel Country	dBpm Records
2023	Cousin	dBpm Records

=== Golden Smog ===
Year	Title	Label
1996	Down by the Old Mainstream	Rykodisc Records
1998	Weird Tales	Rykodisc Records
2006	Another Fine Day	Lost Highway Records

=== Loose Fur ===
Year	Title	Label
2003	Loose Fur	Drag City
2006	Born Again in the USA	Drag City

=== The Minus 5 ===
Year	Title	Label
2003	Down with Wilco	Yep Roc Records
2004	At the Organ EP	Yep Roc Records
2006	The Minus 5	Yep Roc Records

=== Tweedy ===
Year	Title	Label
2014	Sukierae	dBpm Records
