= Woody Guthrie Foundation =

The Woody Guthrie Foundation, founded in 1972, is a non-profit organization which formerly served as administrator and caretaker of the Woody Guthrie Archives. The Foundation was originally based in Brooklyn, New York and directed by Woody Guthrie's daughter Nora Guthrie.

The foundation's archives were acquired by the Tulsa-based George Kaiser Foundation. in 2013. The Center officially opened on April 27, 2013.

The Woody Guthrie Center features, in addition to the archives, a museum focused on the life and the influence of Guthrie through his music, writings, art, and political activities. The museum is open to the public.

On September 6, 2007, Woody Guthrie Publications, in cooperation with the Woody Guthrie Foundation released The Live Wire: Woody Guthrie in Performance 1949, accompanied by a 72-page book describing the performance and the project. Paul Braverman, a student at Rutgers University in 1949, made the recordings himself using a small wire recorder at a Guthrie concert in Newark, New Jersey. On February 10, 2008, the release was the recipient of a Grammy Award in the category Best Historical Album.

== The Woody Guthrie Archives ==
Dedicated to the preservation and dissemination of information about Guthrie's vast cultural legacy, the Woody Guthrie Archives houses the largest collection of Woody Guthrie material in the world. The archives opened to the public in New York City in 1996. The archives were subsequently moved to the new Woody Guthrie Center in Tulsa, Oklahoma in 2013.

The archives are open only to researchers by appointment. The archives contains thousands of items related to Guthrie, including original artwork, books, correspondence, lyrics, manuscripts, media, notebooks, periodicals, personal papers, photographs, scrapbooks, and other special collections.

Nora Guthrie opened up the Foundation's archives to musicians of many types, who she encouraged to write and record music for the many hundreds of Woody Guthrie's written lyrics. Following Woody Guthrie's death, many of these lyrics were without surviving melodies, as Woody did not write musical notation and never recorded (or taught anyone) the majority of his original compositions.

In 1995, Nora Guthrie had invited alternative folk-rocker Billy Bragg to select some lyrics from the archives to be set to music and then to be recorded commercially. Bragg then invited the alt-country band Wilco to help complete the project. Wilco and Bragg released 2 acclaimed "Mermaid Avenue" albums in 1998 and 2000, using Woody's lyrics set to their own musical compositions. Also, a film documentary Man in the Sand. was released documenting not only the making of the Mermaid Avenue albums but also Bragg's exploration of Woody Guthrie's origins in hometown Okemah, Oklahoma. Many other collaborative projects by others have followed.

== Posthumous collaborations ==
Following is a comprehensive list of commercial recordings containing songs which have lyrics written by Woody Guthrie and music subsequently written by others:

- 1970 - Country Joe McDonald - "Woman at Home", sung at a group Woody Guthrie tribute concert at Hollywood Bowl and broadcast via PBS television (single track, appearing also on the 1986 audio soundtrack album of the concert, album title A Tribute to Woody Guthrie)
- 1998 - Billy Bragg & Wilco - Mermaid Avenue (album), with guest vocalist Natalie Merchant on tracks 3 & 4.
- 1999 - Billy Bragg & Wilco - She Came Along to Me (EP) - the title track is a single from the 1998 album, with alternate versions of 2 other tracks from that album, plus 2 additional tracks that were later included in Volume III.
- 1999 - Red Dirt Rangers - "Cadillac Eight" (single track, on their album Rangers Command).
- 1999 - Billy Bragg & the Blokes - "All You Fascists" (single), this is the B-side of "Upfield" and is a loping-rhythm version of the song which was rendered with a more driving rhythm on Mermaid Avenue Vol. II. The Blokes single version also appeared on disc 2 of the 2003 Billy Bragg compilation album Must I Paint You a Picture.
- 2000 - Billy Bragg & Wilco - Mermaid Avenue Vol. II (album), with guest vocalists Natalie Merchant and Corey Harris featured on one track each - this album was culled from the same recording sessions as the 1998 album.
- 2000 - Arlo Guthrie and various artists - Till We Outnumber 'Em (album) - (this is mostly not Woody's songs, but one track is Billy Bragg's vocal of "Against th' Law", previously sung by Corey Harris).
- 2000 - Slaid Cleaves - "This Morning I Am Born Again" (single track, on his album Broke Down)
- 2000 - The Vanaver Caravan - Pastures of Plenty (album) - this is mostly Woody Guthrie covers, but 2 of the songs ("Gipsies Fortune" and "Just One More Time") have melodies written by Bill Vanaver.
- 2000 - The Autumn Defense - "Revolutionary Mind" (single track on their album The Green Hour).
- 2000 - Joel Rafael Band - a cover of the Bragg/Guthrie song "Way Over Yonder in the Minor Key" (single track, on their album Hopper).
- 2001 - Kim Wilson - 2 songs ("Bigger" and "New Baby Train") on a multiple-artist collection of Woody's children's songs called Daddy-O Daddy. These are the only songs that are not straight Woody Guthrie covers (tune of "Bigger" and part of the tune of "New Baby Train" written by Frankie Fuchs).
- 2002 - Ellis Paul - "God's Promise" (single track, on his album The Speed of Trees)
- 2002 - Jay Bennett & Edward Burch - The Palace At 4AM (Part 1) contains two songs, "No Church Tonite" and "Little White Cottage" with music written by Bennett
- 2003 - Jay Bennett & Edward Burch - Palace 1919 contains demos/alternate versions of "No Church Tonite" and "Little White Cottage"
- 2003 - Hans-Eckardt Wenzel - Ticky Tock (album, English and German versions) Wenzel's music for this project is in the style of classic Weimar cabaret, complete with tuba and a brass section.
- 2003 - Blackfire - Woody Guthrie Singles (EP)
- 2003 - Anti-Flag - "Post-War Breakout" (single track, on their album The Terror State)
- 2003 - Dropkick Murphys - "Gonna Be a Blackout Tonight" (single track, on their album Blackout)
- 2003 - Joel Rafael - Woodeye: Songs of Woody Guthrie (album) - (This album includes 12 Guthrie covers, 1 Rafael original and 1 collaboration: "Dance a Little Longer".)
- 2004 - Eliza Gilkyson - "Peace Call" (single track, on her album Land of Milk and Honey)
- 2004 - Janis Ian - "I Hear You Sing Again" (single track, on her album Billie's Bones)
- 2004 - Jay Bennett - Bigger Than Blue contains "Cajun Angel" with music written by Bennett
- 2005 - John McCutcheon - Mightier Than the Sword (album) - this contains 2 songs with words by Guthrie and music by McCutcheon: "Harness Up the Day" and "Old Cap Moore"
- 2005 - Ray Wylie Hubbard - cover of Slaid Cleaves' "This Morning I am Born Again", (single track) (a cappella group sing) on his album Delirium Tremolos.
- 2005 - Joel Rafael - Woodyboye: Songs Of Woody Guthrie And Tales Worth Telling, Vol. 2 (album) - (This album is a mix of Woody Guthrie covers and 4 posthumous collaborations.)
- 2005 - The Italian Celtic band Modena City Ramblers recorded Billy Bragg's 1998 version of "All You Fascists" as a single track on their album Appunti Partigiani
- 2005 - Dropkick Murphys - "I'm Shipping Up to Boston" (single track on their album The Warrior's Code)
- 2005 - Sharon Jones & the Dap-Kings - "This Land Is Your Land" (single track on their album Naturally) - essentially they discarded Woody's tune for this song and created a new hiphop setting. The track was used as theme music over the opening credits for the 2022 Showtime TV series The First Lady.
- 2006 - Klezmatics - Wonder Wheel (album)
- 2006 - Klezmatics - Woody Guthrie's Happy Joyous Hanukkah (album) - (This album is a mix of Woody Guthrie covers, posthumous collaborations and Klezmatics instrumentals.)
- 2008 - Jonatha Brooke - The Works (album)
- 2009 - Sarah Lee Guthrie and Family - Go Waggaloo - 3 of the 13 songs on this album have lyrics written originally by Woody Guthrie. The title track and "Fox and the Goose" were set to music by Sarah Lee Guthrie. "Bright Clear Day" was set to music by Sarah and her husband, Johnny Irion.
- 2009 - Sarah Lee Guthrie & Johnny Irion - "Folksong", (single track, on their album Folksong), with music by Woody's granddaughter Sarah.
- 2010 (recorded 2006) - Arlo Guthrie & Wenzel - "My Peace", (single track, on their album Every 100 Years), with music by Woody's son Arlo, and includes a translation "Mein Frieden" by Hans-Eckardt Wenzel.
- 2010 - Tim O'Brien - "The Sun Jumped Up", (single track, from his album Chicken & Egg)
- 2011 - Billy Bragg - "All You Fascists 2010" (single track, on his EP 6 Songs from Pressure Drop). This uses only the chorus of Woody's "All You Fascists" lyrics (see above, and also see below re: Woody's own version) with completely new verses and different music by Bragg.
- 2011 - Rob Wasserman and others - Note of Hope (album), a project long in the making, featuring musicians and narrators including Jackson Browne, Ani DiFranco, Kurt Elling, Michael Franti, Nellie McKay, Tom Morello, Van Dyke Parks, Madeleine Peyroux, Lou Reed, Pete Seeger, Studs Terkel, and Tony Trischka - unlike the other recordings listed here, this album features mainly (but not exclusively) Woody's prose writings, some read with jazz backing tracks and others ingeniously set to music.
- 2011 - Jackson Browne and Rob Wasserman - "You Know the Night" (single) - (This is a radio edit, 4:02 in length, the original album track on Note of Hope being 14:52 long).
- 2012 - Jay Farrar and others - New Multitudes (album), with musicians including Will Johnson, Anders Parker, and Yim Yames.
- 2012 - Billy Bragg & Wilco - Mermaid Avenue Vol. III (album), a collection of outtakes from the sessions in the late 1990s, including 2 tracks with guest vocals by (and music written by) Corey Harris, "Gotta Work" and "Tea Bag Blues". One of the songs on this album, "When the Roses Bloom Again", is set to lyrics actually written by Will D. Cobb and Gus Edwards. Jeff Tweedy of Wilco found the words among Woody's writings in the archive and wrote a new tune.
- 2012 - Billy Bragg & Wilco - Mermaid Avenue the Complete Sessions (album) - simultaneously released with Vol. III, this set contains all three volumes plus a booklet, along with a DVD of "Man in the Sand".
- 2012 - Lucinda Williams - "House of Earth" live track, on the album Woody Guthrie at 100: Live at the Kennedy Center by various artists - Guthrie's lyrics are edited somewhat by Williams
- 2014 - Honeyky Hanukah - this is a children's story book illustrated by Dave Horowitz based upon the verses in Woody Guthrie's song Honeyky Hanuka, and appropriately includes a CD of music from the Klezmatics' 2006 album Woody Guthrie's Happy Joyous Hanukkah where that song initially appeared.
- 2015 - Jorma Kaukonen - "Suffer Little Children to Come Unto Me" (single track, from his album Ain't in No Hurry) - the music is credited to Jorma Kaukonen and Larry Campbell.
- 2016 - Lucinda Williams - "House of Earth" studio track, on her album The Ghosts of Highway 20, recorded in 2015
- 2016 - Del McCoury Band - Del & Woody (album)
- 2016 - U.S. Elevator (ft. Johnny Irion), also Ryan Harvey; 2 versions of the song "Beach Haven Ain't My Home/Old Man Trump" on a 4-song EP I Don't Like the Way This World's A-treatin' Me by various performers. The lyric has been changed in at least one place. Where it now says "Beach Haven is Trump's tower" Woody's original on file at the Foundation says "Beach Haven looks like heaven."
- 2017 - John Mellencamp - "My Soul's Got Wings", (single track, on his album Sad Clowns & Hillbillies)
- 2018 - John McCutcheon - "When My Fight for Life Is Over", (single track, from his album Ghost Light)
- 2018 - Jimmy LaFave - Peace Town (album) - this posthumous release contains 3 songs with Guthrie lyrics set to LaFave music, including the title track.
- 2022 - Dropkick Murphys - This Machine Still Kills Fascists (album), all tracks, except "Dig a Hole" which is a Woody Guthrie vocal track with Dropkick Murphys instrumental backing superimposed.
- 2023 - Dropkick Murphys - Okemah Rising (album) - This, incidentally, includes an alternate version of their 2005 Woody/Dropkick song "I'm Shipping Up to Boston."

One of the lyrics which was worked several times by Billy Bragg, "All You Fascists", has subsequently surfaced in a recording of a 1944 radio program "The Martins and the McCoys". Guthrie appeared in the program with other folk singers and can be heard singing "All of You Fascists Bound to Lose," set to his original melody, which is of course substantially different from the melodies Bragg has devised for it.

Given the quantity of these posthumous collaborations, it was perhaps inevitable that there would be some lyrics set to more than one melody. For instance, track 3 on the Wasserman album ("Ease My Revolutionary Mind") uses the same set of lyrics as track 3 on the Farrar album (as well as track 3 on the Autumn Defense album). Track 2 on the Brooke album ("You'd Oughta Be Satisfied Now") uses the same set of lyrics as track 5 on the third volume of "Mermaid Avenue". The Woody Guthrie Publications website lists Jonatha Brooke's version of "You'd Oughta Be Satisfied Now" as a "derivative work".
