= Christopher Frederick =

Christopher Frederick may refer to:

- Christopher Frederick (producer), of Man in the Sand
- Sir Christopher St John Frederick, 11th Baronet (born 1950), of the Frederick baronets
