= Off Camera =

American television series

Off Camera is an American interview-based television series, magazine and podcast. It was created by photographer and director Sam Jones, who is also the host. Off Camera airs on DirecTV's Audience channel 239, with a twelfth season as of August 19, 2019.

Jones created the show out of his passion for the long-form conversational interview, and as a way to share his conversations with a myriad of artists, actors, musicians, directors, skateboarders, photographers and writers that pique his interest. Interviewees featured on Off Camera have included Dave Grohl, Robert Downey Jr., Sarah Silverman, Jeff Bridges, Jackson Browne, Jessica Chastain and Tony Hawk, among others.

== Season 1 ==
Season 1 of Off Camera premiered on DirecTV in February 2014. It featured Sam Jones in conversation with the following guests.

- 1. Val McCallum
- 2. John Krasinski
- 3. Blake Mills
- 4. Aimee Mann
- 5. Robert Downey Jr.
- 6. Tony Hawk
- 7. Dave Grohl
- 8. Judd Apatow
- 9. Laura Dern
- 10. Stacy Peralta
- 11. Martin Short
- 12. Will Forte
- 13. Michael B. Jordan

== Season 2 ==
Season 2 of Off Camera premiered on DirecTV in the Fall of 2014. It featured Sam Jones in conversation with the following guests.

- 14. Sarah Silverman
- 15. Matt Damon
- 16. Ed Helms
- 17. Jackson Browne
- 18. Judy Greer
- 19. Jeff Bridges
- 20. Taylor Goldsmith
- 21. Laird Hamilton
- 22. Jon Brion
- 23. Jason Sudeikis
- 24. Chris Pine
- 25. Jessica Chastain

== Season 3 ==
Season 3 of Off Camera premiered on DirecTV in March 2015. It featured Sam Jones in conversation with the following guests.

- 26. Will Ferrell
- 27. Ethan Hawke
- 28. Jon Hamm
- 29. Lake Bell
- 30. Jennifer Beals
- 31. Zach Braff
- 32. Lizzy Caplan
- 33. Chris Moore
- 34. Rashida Jones
- 35. Kevin Bacon
- 36. Dax Shepard

== Season 4 ==
Season 4 of Off Camera premiered on DirecTV on September 21, 2015. It featured Sam Jones in conversation with the following guests.

- 37. Jake Gyllenhaal
- 38. Cindy Crawford
- 39. Elliot Page
- 40. Tatiana Maslany
- 41. Olivia Wilde
- 42. Jack Black
- 43. Carrie Brownstein
- 44. Connie Britton
- 45. William H. Macy
- 46. Joseph Gordon-Levitt
- 47. Paul Dano
- 48. Bill Lawrence
- 49. Linda Cardellini
- 50. Aubrey Plaza
- 51. Tim Robbins
- 52. Matt Berninger

== Season 5 ==
Season 5 of Off Camera premiered on DirecTV on March 7, 2016. It featured Sam Jones in conversation with the following guests.

- 53. Joanne Froggatt
- 54. Dan Patrick
- 55. Michelle Monaghan
- 56. Don Cheadle
- 57. Kristen Bell
- 58. Richard Linklater
- 59. Bob Odenkirk
- 60. Titus Welliver
- 61. Glen Hansard
- 62. The Edge
- 63. Krysten Ritter
- 64. Keegan-Michael Key
- 65. Kathryn Hahn
- 66. Imogen Poots
- 67. Thomas Middleditch
- 68. Luke Wilson

== Season 6 ==
Season 6 of Off Camera premiered on DirecTV on September 12, 2016. It featured Sam Jones in conversation with the following guests.

- 69. Todd Phillips
- 70. Adam Scott
- 71. Vince Vaughn
- 72. Mindy Kaling
- 73. Kate Beckinsale
- 74. Nick Offerman
- 75. Ewan McGregor
- 76. Mark Duplass
- 77. Thandie Newton
- 78. Mike Colter
- 79. Rob Lowe
- 80. Mackenzie Davis
- 81. Michael Shannon
- 82. Riz Ahmed
- 83. Andrew Garfield
- 84. Greta Gerwig

== Season 7 ==
Season 7 of Off Camera premiered on DirecTV on January 9, 2017, featuring Sam Jones in conversation with the following guests.

- 85. Rachel Bloom
- 86. Aaron Paul
- 87. Ricky Carmichael
- 88. Elijah Wood
- 89. David Oyelowo
- 90. Kenneth Lonergan
- 91. Sam Richardson
- 92. Gillian Jacobs
- 93. Jerrod Carmichael
- 94. Maggie Siff
- 95. Hank Azaria
- 96. Courteney Cox
- 97. Jenny Slate
- 98. Freida Pinto
- 99. Matt Walsh
- 100. Ron Howard
- 101. Colin Hanks
- 102. Elisabeth Moss
- 103. Chris Shiflett
- 104. Billy Crudup
- 105. Danny McBride
- 106. Jim Jefferies
- 107. Sam Elliott
- 108. Kumail Nanjiani
- 109. Zoe Lister-Jones
- 110. Zoe Kazan
- 111. Michaela Watkins
- 112. Lauren Lapkus
- 113. Holly Hunter

== Season 8 ==
Season 8 of Off Camera premiered on DirecTV on May 1, 2017, featuring Sam Jones in conversation with the following guests.

- 114. Mike White
- 115. Jay Duplass
- 116. Alan Tudyk
- 117. Tom Papa
- 118. Nick Kroll
- 119. Chadwick Boseman
- 120. Willem Dafoe
- 121. Rebecca Hall
- 122. Emmy Rossum
- 123. Michael Connelly
- 124. Pamela Adlon
- 125. Jeff Daniels
- 126. Sam Rockwell
- 127. Octavia Spencer
- 128. John Doe
- 129. Neil Patrick Harris

== Season 9 ==
Season 9 of Off Camera premiered on DirecTV on September 25, 2017, featuring Sam Jones in conversation with the following guests.

- 130. Pete Holmes
- 131. Diane Kruger
- 132. Jenna Fischer
- 133. Danai Gurira
- 134. Common
- 135. Taylor Kitsch
- 136. Jason Katims
- 137. Andie MacDowell
- 138. Bill Hader
- 139. Dan Stevens
- 140. John Goodman
- 141. Zach Woods
- 142. Mae Whitman
- 143. Josh Radnor
- 144. Christina Hendricks
- 145. Jason Isbell
- 146. John Mulaney
- 147. Peter Krause
- 148. Natasha Leggero
- 149. Sarah Paulson
- 150. Rachel Brosnahan
- 151. Alison Brie
- 152. Keri Russell
- 153. Betty Gilpin

== Season 10 ==
Season 10 of Off Camera premiered on DirecTV on June 11, 2018, featuring Sam Jones in conversation with the following guests.

- 154. Rose Byrne
- 155. Chris O'Dowd
- 156. Awkwafina
- 157. Uzo Aduba
- 158. Paul Feig
- 159. Chris Messina
- 160. Elizabeth Olsen
- 161. Eric Idle
- 162. Javier Bardem
- 163. Sissy Spacek
- 164. Mary Elizabeth Winstead
- 165. Ryan Bingham
- 166. Hasan Minhaj
- 167. Rosamund Pike
- 168. Matt Damon
- 169. Bo Burnham
- 170. Carey Mulligan
- 171. Ted Danson
- 172. Emily Mortimer
- 173. Steve Coogan
- 174. Ron Livingston

== Season 11 ==
Season 11 of Off Camera premiered on DirecTV on November 26, 2018, featuring Sam Jones in conversation with the following guests.

- 175. D'Arcy Carden
- 176. Dax Shepard
- 177. Regina Hall
- 178. Stephen Merchant
- 179. Daniel Radcliffe
- 180. Norman Reedus
- 181. Patton Oswalt
- 182. Ray Romano
- 183. Lauren Cohan
- 184. Brit Marling
- 185. Joey King
- 186. David Harbour
- 187. Busy Philipps
- 188. Seth Rogen
- 189. "Weird Al" Yankovic
- 190. Sarah Goldberg
- 191. Jason Mantzoukas
- 192. Andrew Bird
- 193. Ian McShane
- 194. Fred Armisen
- 195. Olivia Wilde
- 196. Sienna Miller
- 197. David Tennant
- 198. Ramy Youssef
- 199. Scoot McNairy
- 200. Robert Downey Jr.

== Season 12 ==
Season 12 of Off Camera premiered on DirecTV on August 19, 2019, featuring Sam Jones in conversation with the following guests.

- 201. Jason Sudeikis (In a role switch, Sudeikis interviews Sam Jones)
- 202. Wyatt Russell
- 203. Constance Wu
- 204. Andrea Savage
- 205. Scott Aukerman
- 206. Zach Galifianakis
- 207. Beth Behrs
- 208. Adam DeVine
- 209. Jake Johnson
- 210. Jeff Bridges
- 211. Edward Norton
- 212. Lance Reddick
- 213. Noomi Rapace
- 214. Josh Gad
- 215. Tracy Letts
- 216. Jenny Slate
- 217. Mike McGill and Steve Caballero
- 218. Liz Phair
- 219. Year-end Holiday Wrap-up Show
