= Hot Sun Cool Shroud =

EP by Wilco
- Released: June 28, 2024
- Recorded: January 2019 – May 2023
- Studios: The Loft, Chicago, Illinois
- Length: 17:40
- Label: dBpm
- Producers: Cate Le Bon; Tom Schick; Jeff Tweedy

Wilco chronology
Cousin (2023)	Hot Sun Cool Shroud (2024)

Hot Sun Cool Shroud is a 2024 EP by the American indie rock band Wilco. It was released on June 28, 2024, to positive reviews by critics.

== Reception ==
Ryan Dillon of Glide Magazine called these tracks "a bit more experimental and sentimental" than the band's 2023 full-length Cousin and characterized them as "a polished collection of songs that would have otherwise been left on the cutting room floor, but there are some highlights on here that diehard Wilco fans won’t want to miss". Editors at Paste chose this as a Pick, rating it a 9.0 out of 10 and critic Matt Mitchell stated that this is better than Cousin with listeners "getting a career’s worth of checkpoints in such a small vacuum, and the EP is a deft reminder that this is one of the greatest rock bands of this century that we’re dealing with after all". Editors at Pitchfork scored this release 8.0 out of 10 and critic Stephen M. Deusner stated that this release has "the vision and the range of their full-lengths" and by being experimental, the band elevates "a modest tracklist into something much bigger than itself". Gypsy Forsyth of Spill Magazine rated Hot Sun Cool Shroud an 8 out of 10 and agreed with Wilco frontman Jeff Tweedy that this release has a “summertime-after-dark kind of feeling” and praised the narrative present in the album.

== Track listing ==
All tracks are written by Jeff Tweedy.

No.	Title	Length
1.	"Hot Sun"	3:29
2.	"Livid"	1:10
3.	"Ice Cream"	3:32
4.	"Annihilation"	3:40
5.	"Inside the Bell Bones"	1:47
6.	"Say You Love Me"	3:58
Total length:		17:40

== Personnel ==
=== Wilco ===
- Nels Cline – instrumentation, recording
- Mikael Jorgensen – instrumentation, recording
- Glenn Kotche – instrumentation, recording
- Patrick Sansone – instrumentation, arrangement on "Hot Sun", string recording on "Hot Sun", recording
- John Stirratt – instrumentation
- Jeff Tweedy – instrumentation, vocals, production, design

=== Additional personnel ===
- Matt Combs – cello on "Hot Sun", viola on "Hot Sun", violin on "Hot Sun", string recording on "Hot Sun"
- Mark Greenberg – assistant audio engineering
- Pekka Kuusisto – violin on "Say You Love Me"
- Cate Le Bon – bass guitar on "Hot Sun", Korg Delta synthesizer on "Hot Sun", production on "Hot Sun"
- Bob Ludwig – audio mastering
- Kathleen Ryan – artwork
- Tom Schick – audio engineering, mixing, production
- Stacy Wakefield-Forté – design

== Charts ==
Chart performance for Hot Sun Cool Shroud
Chart (2025)	Peak position
Belgian Albums (Ultratop Flanders)	157

== See also ==
- 2024 in American music
