= More Like the Moon =

EP by Wilco
- Released: April 23, 2003
- Recorded: 2001–02
- Studio: The Loft (Chicago)
- Length: 21:43
- Label: Nonesuch
- Producer: Wilco

Wilco chronology
Yankee Hotel Foxtrot (2002)	More Like the Moon (2003)	A Ghost Is Born (2004)

Wilco's More Like the Moon EP (also called Bridge and Australian EP) was originally released as a bonus disc to the Australian version of Yankee Hotel Foxtrot. The band ended up releasing the EP via the band's website in 2003 to any who had bought Yankee Hotel Foxtrot. The EP features an alternate version of "Kamera", four previously unreleased songs, and an earlier take of "Handshake Drugs", a song that was retooled for A Ghost Is Born.

Professional ratings
Review scores
Source	Rating
Pitchfork	7/10
Stylus	B−

== Track listing ==
All songs written by Wilco.

1. "Camera" – 3:44
2. "Handshake Drugs" – 5:11
3. "Woodgrain" – 1:42
4. "A Magazine Called Sunset" – 2:39
5. "Bob Dylan's 49th Beard" – 2:20
6. "More Like the Moon" – 6:07
