= The Wilco Book =

The Wilco Book (2004, ISBN 0-9713670-3-5) is an exploration of the artistic statement presented by the band Wilco. Artwork created by the band, photographer Michael Schmelling, and mixed media artist Fred Tomaselli is interspersed with comments from the band, technicians, and managers, as well as essays by Henry Miller and Rick Moody, and poetry from Bern Porter's collection Found Poetry. Interviews were conducted by PictureBox, who edited and designed the book (which is credited to Wilco and Picturebox with photography by Michael Schmelling). Packaged with the book is a CD of previously unreleased experimental music, which is discussed in the first appendix by Mikael Jorgensen, who produced and played on the sessions before he formally joined Wilco.

== Bonus CD track listing ==
1. "Pure Bug Beauty" – 7:31
2. "This is New" – 4:26
3. "Diamond Claw" – 3:12
4. "This is New (The Explanation)" – 1:53
5. "What Good Am I" – 1:23
6. "Here Comes Everybody" – 2:56
7. "Hummingbird" – 3:57
8. "The High Heat" – 2:55
9. "Doubt" – 1:27
10. "Barnyard Pimp" – 5:13
11. "Rottnest" – 1:24
12. "Hamami" – 2:54
