= Jay Bennett =

American songwriter (1963–2009)

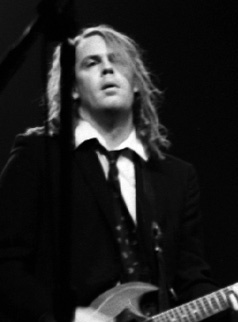
- Jay Bennett performing with Wilco in 2000

Background information
- Born: Jay Walter Bennett; November 15, 1963; Rolling Meadows, Illinois, U.S.
- Died: May 24, 2009 (aged 45) Urbana, Illinois, U.S.
- Genres: Alternative country, garage rock, Americana, pop, rock, experimental
- Occupations: Singer-songwriter, Guitarist, Producer, Engineer
- Instruments: Guitar, piano, organ, mellotron, banjo, bass, drums, synthesizer, harmonica, mandolin
- Years active: 1991–2009
- Labels: Undertow Music; Nonesuch; Reprise; Rykodisc

Jay Walter Bennett (November 15, 1963 – May 24, 2009) was an American multi-instrumentalist, engineer, producer, and singer-songwriter, best known as a member of the band Wilco from 1994 to 2001.

== Biography ==
=== Early life and work with Wilco ===
Jay Bennett was born November 15, 1963, in Rolling Meadows, Illinois, a suburb northwest of Chicago.

Bennett was a founding member of Titanic Love Affair. The band recorded three albums in the 1990s: Titanic Love Affair (1991), No Charisma (EP, 1992), and Their Titanic Majesty's Request (1996). He also played guitar with Steve Pride and His Blood Kin and Gator Alley.

Nearing a master's degree in education at the University of Illinois, Bennett became a classroom teacher at Urbana Junior High, first as a substitute in 1985. Bennett was a full-time middle-school math teacher in 1986 at the then redesignated Urbana Middle School. He also worked for several years as an electronics technician for a local audio-video repair store.

From 1994 through 2001 Bennett was a member of Wilco. Conflicts between front man Jeff Tweedy and Bennett that would contribute to Bennett's split with Wilco are visible in the Sam Jones film I Am Trying to Break Your Heart: A Film About Wilco. Although Bennett sought to act as both mixer and engineer for Yankee Hotel Foxtrot, Tweedy was unsure of Bennett's abilities against those of producer Jim O'Rourke. Bennett claimed he "tried to stay away from the mixing, having been reminded that Jim didn't like a lot of folks around when he was mixing." Tweedy and Bennett frequently argued over whether the album should be accessible to a general listener, or attempt to cover new musical ground. Unbeknownst to Bennett, Tweedy invited O'Rourke to remix "I Am Trying to Break Your Heart", and the results impressed the other band members – even Bennett. Tensions grew between Bennett and O'Rourke because Bennett wanted to play a more integral role regarding the mixing of the album. O'Rourke cut the contributions of other members on several of the songs; some songs, such as "Poor Places", only featured the Loose Fur trio of Tweedy, O'Rourke and Wilco drummer Glenn Kotche. Bennett claimed he contributed organ, guitars, and the "Noiz section" to "Poor Places". The album was completed in 2001, and Bennett was dismissed from the band immediately afterwards.

=== Solo career ===
After leaving Wilco, Bennett released five solo albums. The first, entitled The Palace at 4 am, was a collaboration with Champaign musician Edward Burch. 2004's Bigger Than Blue was a more stripped-down set of personal songs. In the same year he released The Beloved Enemy, which saw Bennett exploring his personal turmoil in even more intimate detail. The Magnificent Defeat was released by Ryko Records in September 2006. He released Whatever Happened I Apologize in November 2008 on rockproper.com. Bennett had been working on a sixth record, titled Kicking at the Perfumed Air. It was released posthumously for free on May 24, 2010, on the Jay Bennett Foundation's website.

In addition to his popularity in Wilco and as a solo performer, Bennett also played on albums by Sheryl Crow, Allison Moorer, Sherry Rich and Billy Joe Shaver, produced Michelle Anthony's 2004 release, "Stand Fall Repeat", West of Rome's 2005 release, "Drunk Tank Decoy", and Blues Traveler's 2005 release, ¡Bastardos!. Bennett mixed the album Double Barrel by Chicago country-rock band Old No. 8.

=== Later life and death ===
In May 2009, Bennett sued Wilco frontman Jeff Tweedy for breach of contract stemming from his work for Wilco. The suit came less than two weeks after Bennett publicly revealed that he needed hip replacement surgery which he could not afford due to his health insurance considering the situation a "pre-existing condition."

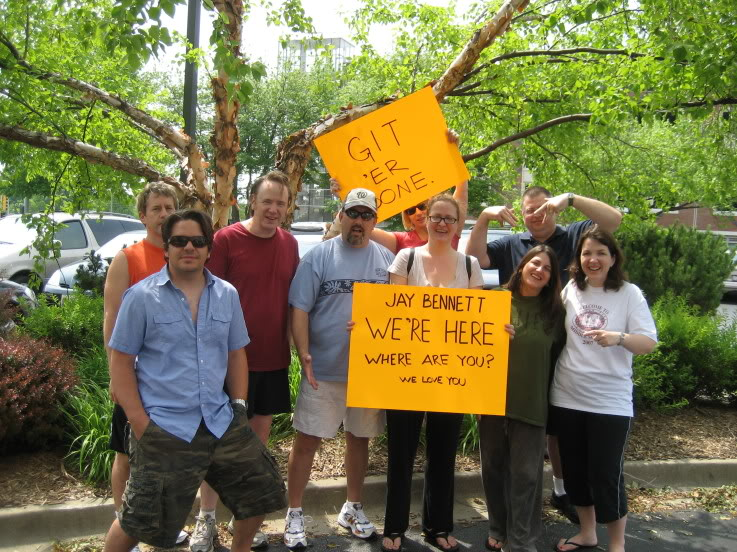
Sign from May 24, 2009, reading "Jay Bennett, we're here, where are you?".

On May 24, 2009, Bennett died unexpectedly in his sleep. On the weekend of his death, members of Titanic Love Affair and fellow bands and friends from its heyday had descended on Champaign-Urbana for a "Play or Pose Reunion" at which Bennett was expected to perform. When Bennett failed to show up for festivities, they posted a picture on the "Play or Pose" website, brandishing a placard reading "Jay Bennett, we're here, where are you? We love you."

The Champaign County coroner reported about one month later that Bennett's death was accidental, and was the result of an overdose of the prescription painkiller Fentanyl. He was wearing a Duragesic patch on his back when his body was found, said Champaign County Coroner Duane Northrup. At the time of his death, Bennett lived in Urbana, Illinois, where he spent most of his time writing songs and recording in his private studio, Pieholden Studios, which was named after "Pieholden Suite" on Wilco's Summerteeth.

Immediately after his death, a friend of Bennett's posted a blog through the musician's MySpace account, saying that Bennett had "been in a really good place these last few years." The post also revealed that he had been looking forward to engineering an unreleased Titanic Love Affair album, another album with Edward Burch titled The Palace at 4 am Part II, and that he had recently enrolled in graduate school classes at the University of Illinois. The post ended by encouraging fans to engage in some of Bennett's favorite activities: "listen to a Nick Lowe album, watch some MythBusters on Discovery, play Warren Zevon’s "Roland the Headless Thompson Gunner," rent Pay It Forward (one of his favorite movies), write a song with the TV on and the sound off," and focus on Bennett's loving spirit.

Former bandmate Jeff Tweedy also made a brief statement on Wilco's official website: "We are all deeply saddened by this tragedy. We will miss Jay as we remember him – as a truly unique and gifted human being and one who made welcome and significant contributions to the band's songs and evolution. Our thoughts go out to his family and friends in this very difficult time."

Bennett's final album, Kicking at the Perfumed Air, was released on July 10, 2010, through The Jay Bennett Foundation. It was made available free of charge, with a suggested donation.

=== Where Are You, Jay Bennett? documentary ===
Co-Directed by Gorman Bechard and Fred Uhter, Where Are You, Jay Bennett? "delves into the life and career of Jay Bennett. The extremely talented musician was a crucial member of Wilco during the band’s formative years."

This documentary released on Blu-ray and pay-per-view on April 19, 2022, and as part of a Record Store Day release with vinyl editions of Bennett's last two albums, Whatever Happened I Apologize and Kicking at the Perfumed Air on April 23, 2022. Per Steve Wosahla with Americana Highways, "The new film does a wonderful job of capturing the quirkiness, inventiveness and brilliance of someone who never met an instrument he couldn't play. Bennett once described hearing the open spaces of the songs and holes that became his sonic landscape. They were at the core of the remarkable string of Wilco’s albums Being There, Summerteeth and Yankee Hotel Foxtrot."

The film was originally started by Uhter, who asked Bechard to take over the project when it stalled. It takes a hard look at Bennett's years in Wilco. "Jay Bennett's reputation never quite recovered from the battering it took in Sam Jones' documentary I Am Trying To Break Your Heart: A Film About Wilco, about the complex, lengthy gestation of 2002's Yankee Hotel Foxtrot in often painful detail, portrayed a band slowly pulling itself apart, with chief songwriters Bennett and Jeff Tweedy its twin opposing forces. Filmmakers Gorman Bechard and Fred Uhter seek to redress the balance".

== Discography ==
=== Albums ===
- The Palace at 4 a.m. (Part I) (with Edward Burch) (2002)
- Bigger than Blue (2004)
- The Beloved Enemy (2004)
- The Magnificent Defeat (2006)
- Whatever Happened I Apologize (2008)
- Kicking at the Perfumed Air (2010)
- Where Are You Jay Bennett? OST (2022)
