= I Am Trying to Break Your Heart: A Film About Wilco =

- Directed by: Sam Jones
- Produced by: Peter Abraham; Sam Jones; Gary Hustwit
- Starring: Jeff Tweedy; John Stirratt; Leroy Bach; Glenn Kotche; Jay Bennett; Tony Margherita; Jonathan "JP" Parker
- Edited by: Erin Nordstrom
- Music by: Wilco
- Distributed by: Cowboy Pictures; Plexifilm
- Release date: July 26, 2002
- Running time: 92 minutes
- Country: United States
- Language: English

I Am Trying to Break Your Heart: A Film About Wilco is a 2002 black-and-white documentary film by director/photographer Sam Jones, following the American alt-country rock band Wilco through the creation and distribution of their fourth studio album Yankee Hotel Foxtrot. The film, distributed to theaters in the United States through Cowboy Pictures, was released on July 26, 2002, three months after the album's retail release.

== Overview ==
With Wilco nearing completion of their album Yankee Hotel Foxtrot, conflict arose between the band and its record label Reprise, a division of the Warner Music Group. Wilco's prior albums had not performed to Reprise's sales expectations, and Reprise was concerned with how to market the new album. It consequently rejected the work and dropped Wilco from the label.

With a completed album and no contractual obligations to Reprise, Wilco made the album available to download on their website. Awareness of the new album became apparent and Wilco's profile was rising. In response, another record label, Nonesuch Records, offered Wilco a new record contract. Nonesuch Records, like Reprise, is a division of Warner Music Group, so Wilco were essentially paid twice for the album by the same record company.

Other scenes depicted the breakdown of the relationship between members Jeff Tweedy and Jay Bennett, and Tweedy's debilitating migraines.

== Cast ==
- Jeff Tweedy
- John Stirratt
- Leroy Bach
- Glenn Kotche
- Jay Bennett
- Tony Margherita

== Release ==
In addition to regular theatrical releases throughout the United States, the film was an official selection of the Los Angeles Film Festival, where the film had its world premiere in June 2002.

== Reception ==
=== Critical response ===
On Rotten Tomatoes, the film holds an approval rating of 88% based on 60 reviews, and an average rating of 6.92/10. The website's critical consensus reads, "Besides being a treat for Wilco fans, I Am Trying to Break Your Heart also exposes the workings of a profit-driven music industry." On Metacritic, the film has a weighted average score of 66 out of 100, based on 24 critics, indicating generally favorable reviews. Reviewing the film after its DVD release, The A.V. Club's Scott Tobias wrote, "On hand with a 16mm black-and-white camera to document the recording process, director/photographer Sam Jones came away with more than he bargained for in I Am Trying To Break Your Heart, a superb portrait of a band and an industry in flux." Chris Morris, reviewing the film for Billboard, wrote that it was "one of the best films ever about the inevitable clash between art and commerce."

== DVD releases ==
A DVD of the film was distributed through Plexifilm and released on April 1, 2003.

(Note that there are two versions of the film on DVD: The original two-disc set, and a newer version which omits Disc 2 and is generally less expensive.)

Disc 1

- The film (digital transfer, 16x9 anamorphic presentation)
- Feature commentary from director Sam Jones and Wilco
- Original theatrical trailer
- English subtitles for the hearing impaired

Disc 2

- Over 70 minutes of extra footage, featuring 17 additional Wilco songs, alternate versions of songs from Yankee Hotel Foxtrot, live concert performances and new unreleased songs
- I Am Trying To Make A Film making-of featurette

Plus:

- Deluxe 40-page booklet with filmmaker's diary, exclusive photos and liner notes from Rolling Stone's David Fricke

=== DVD Disc 2 bonus track listing ===
- "Pot Kettle Black" *
- "Busy Bee Monkey Song" (also known as "Monkey Mess")
- "Why Would You Wanna Live"
- "Pieholden Suite" *
- "Acuff-Rose"
- "Please Tell My Brother"
- "Cars Can't Escape" *
- "I'm the Man Who Loves You" *
- "Magazine Called Sunset"
- "Wait Up"
- "Radio Cure" *
- "Monday"
- "Someday Soon"
- "Bob Dylan's 49th Beard"
- "How to Fight Loneliness"
- "Not for the Season"
- "Sunken Treasure"

All songs written by Jeff Tweedy, except as noted *, written by Jeff Tweedy and Jay Bennett

== Legacy ==
In a 2021 interview with Vanity Fair, The War on Drugs lead singer Adam Granduciel stated that the documentary had inspired him to become a musician.
