= Down with Wilco =

Studio album by the Minus 5
- Released: February 25, 2003
- Studio: SOMA
- Genre: Rock
- Label: Yep Roc

The Minus 5 chronology
I Don't Know Who I Am (Let the War Against Music Begin Vol. 2) (2003)	Down with Wilco (2003)	In Rock (2004)

Professional ratings
Review scores
Source	Rating
AllMusic	4.5/5 stars
Pitchfork Media	7.3/10
Rolling Stone	3/5 stars

Down with Wilco is the fifth album by American rock band the Minus 5. Produced by Scott McCaughey and Jeff Tweedy, it is a collaboration between McCaughey and Wilco, recorded at SOMA Studios Chicago in September and December 2001. Released on Yep Roc in 2003, it also features contributions from Peter Buck of R.E.M., Ken Stringfellow of the Posies, Sean O'Hagan of the High Llamas, with Jessy Greene providing strings. The double-vinyl version adds five songs not included on the CD.

== Track listing ==
All songs written by Scott McCaughey, except as indicated.

1. "The Days of Wine and Booze" – 3:42
2. "Retrieval of You" (McCaughey/Jeff Tweedy) – 3:51
3. "That's Not the Way That It's Done" – 3:29
4. "The Town That Lost Its Groove Supply" (McCaughey/Tweedy) – 2:35
5. "Daggers Drawn" – 2:47
6. "Where Will You Go?" – 3:17
7. "Life Left Him There" – 3:00
8. "The Family Gardener" (McCaughey/Tweedy) – 2:44
9. "The Old Plantation" – 3:40
10. "What I Don't Believe" – 2:29
11. "View from Below" – 3:17
12. "I'm Not Bitter" (Tad Hutchison/McCaughey) – 2:58
13. "Dear Employer (The Reason I Quit)" – 4:13

== Personnel ==
The Minus 5

- Scott McCaughey – vocals, piano, acoustic guitar, keyboards, pedal steel, trumpet, bass harmonica, strings, ocarina, percussion, kalimba
- Jeff Tweedy – guitar, backing vocals, synth, orchestron, marimba, piano
- Glenn Kotche – drums, percussion
- Peter Buck – 12-string guitar, e-bow guitar, mandolin, six-string bass, slide guitar, electronic tanpura, electric guitar
- John Stiratt – bass, backing vocals
- Leroy Bach – acoustic guitar, synth, piano, electric guitar, Wurlitzer, baritone sax, marimba
- Ken Stringfellow – backing vocals, organ, banjo, baritone guitar, Moroccan horn

Additional musicians

- Jessy Greene – violin, cello (1, 8, 9)
- Rebecca Gates – backing vocals (3, 5)
- Charlie Francis – mellotron (5), backing vocals (7)
- Sean O'Hagan – banjo, acoustic guitar (3)
- Christy McWilson – backing vocals (6)
- Brian Paulson – "yakbox" (8)
