= Wilco =

American alternative rock band

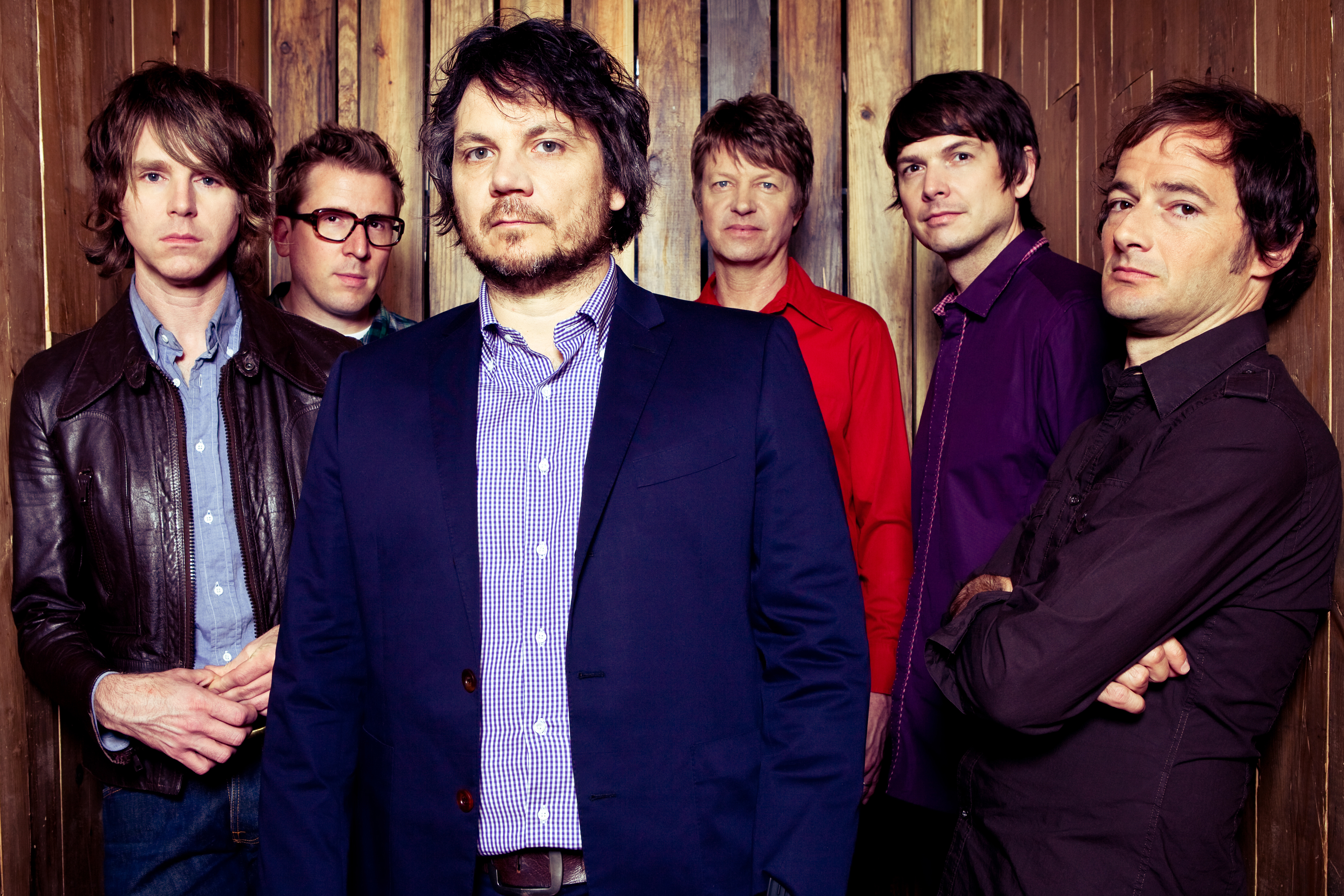
- Wilco at Massachusetts Museum of Contemporary Art, Solid Sound Fest, 2011. Pictured left to right: Patrick Sansone, Mikael Jorgensen, Jeff Tweedy, Nels Cline, Glenn Kotche, John Stirratt

Background information
- Origin: Chicago, Illinois, U.S.
- Genres: Indie rock; alternative rock; alternative country; art rock; experimental rock; folk rock
- Works: Wilco discography
- Years active: 1994–present
- Labels: dBpm; Nonesuch; Reprise
- Spinoffs: The Autumn Defense; Loose Fur; Tweedy
- Spinoff of: Uncle Tupelo
- Members: Jeff Tweedy; John Stirratt; Glenn Kotche; Mikael Jorgensen; Nels Cline; Pat Sansone
- Past members: Ken Coomer; Max Johnston; Brian Henneman; Jay Bennett; Bob Egan; Leroy Bach
- Website: wilcoworld.net

Wilco is an American rock band based in Chicago. The band was formed in 1994 by the remaining members of alternative country group Uncle Tupelo after singer Jay Farrar's departure. Wilco's lineup changed frequently during its first decade, with only singer Jeff Tweedy and bassist John Stirratt remaining from the original incarnation. Since early 2004 the lineup has been unchanged, consisting of Tweedy, Stirratt, guitarist Nels Cline, multi-instrumentalist Pat Sansone, keyboard player Mikael Jorgensen, and drummer Glenn Kotche. Wilco has released thirteen studio albums, a live double album, and four collaborations: three with Billy Bragg and one with the Minus 5.

Wilco's music has been inspired by a wide variety of artists and styles, including Bill Fay, the Beatles, and Television; in turn, the band has influenced music by many modern alternative rock acts. The band continued in the alternative country style of Uncle Tupelo on its debut album, A.M. (1995), but has since introduced more experimental aspects to their music, including elements of alternative rock and classic pop. Wilco's musical style has evolved from a 1990s country rock sound to a current "eclectic indie rock collective that touches on many eras and genres".

Wilco received media attention for their fourth album, Yankee Hotel Foxtrot (2001), and the controversy surrounding it. After the recording sessions were complete, Reprise Records rejected the album and dismissed Wilco from the label. As part of a buy-out deal, Reprise gave Wilco the rights to the album for free. After streaming Foxtrot on its website, Wilco sold the album to Nonesuch Records in 2002. Both record labels are subsidiaries of Warner Music Group, leading a critic to say the album showed "how screwed up the music business is in the early twenty-first century." The event was immortalized in the documentary I Am Trying to Break Your Heart; director Sam Jones followed the band as they wrote and produced the record. Yankee Hotel Foxtrot is Wilco's most successful release to date, selling over 670,000 copies. Wilco won two Grammy Awards for their fifth studio album, 2004's A Ghost Is Born, including Best Alternative Music Album. Wilco released their thirteenth studio album, Cousin, in September 2023.

== History ==
=== Formation, A.M., and Being There (1994–1996) ===
Wilco was formed following the breakup of the influential alternative country music group Uncle Tupelo. Singer Jay Farrar quit the band in 1994 because of a soured relationship with co-singer Jeff Tweedy. Both Tweedy and Farrar immediately sought to form bands after the breakup, with Farrar organizing Son Volt. Tweedy's new band included all current members of Uncle Tupelo lineup sans Farrar, including bassist John Stirratt, drummer Ken Coomer, and multi-instrumentalist Max Johnston. He even enlisted Uncle Tupelo guest guitarist Brian Henneman of the Bottle Rockets to perform, who appears on many of the tracks for Wilco's debut album, A.M.. The group considered retaining the Uncle Tupelo name but decided to call themselves "Wilco" after the military and commercial aviation radio voice abbreviation for "will comply", a choice which Tweedy has said is "fairly ironic for a rock band to name themselves."

After collaborating with Syd Straw on a cover version of the Ernest Tubb song "The T.B. is Whipping Me" (released in September 1994 on the Red Hot + Country compilation produced by the Red Hot Organization), Wilco began recording tracks for A.M., their first studio album, at Easley studio in June 1994. A demo tape from the recordings was sent to executives at Reprise Records, a subsidiary of Warner Brothers, and the label signed Tweedy to a contract. Although Tweedy said that he wanted a more collaborative project than Uncle Tupelo, only his name appeared on the Reprise contract. Tweedy requested songwriting submissions from other members, but only one submission—John Stirratt's "It's Just That Simple"—appeared on A.M.. It was the last song Wilco ever released that was lyrically solely written by a member besides Tweedy.

Stylistically similar to Uncle Tupelo, the music on A.M. was considered to be straightforward alternative country rock in what Tweedy later described as "trying to tread some water with a perceived audience." A.M. peaked at number 27 on the Billboard Heatseekers chart, considerably lower than the debut album of Jay Farrar's new band, Son Volt. The album was met with modest reviews though it would rank thirty-fourth in the Village Voice's 1995 Pazz & Jop critics poll. Critically and commercially paling in comparison to the reception of Son Volt's album, the Wilco members perceived A.M. to be a failure. Shortly after the release of the album, multi-instrumentalist Jay Bennett joined the band, providing the band with a keyboardist and another guitarist.

"I Must Be High"
Sample from "I Must Be High", the first track from A.M.. The song is an example of the straightforward alternative country music described by Tweedy as "trying to tread some water with a perceived audience."

Wilco made its live debut on November 17, 1994 to a capacity crowd at Cicero's Basement Bar in St. Louis, Missouri (the band was billed for the occasion as "Black Shampoo"). During the two hundred-date tour supporting A.M., Tweedy began to write songs for a second album. The lyrical theme of the songs reflected a relationship between musical artist and a listener; Tweedy chose this topic because he sought to eschew the alternative country fan base. Ken Coomer elaborated:

The whole No Depression thing was funny to us because people seemed to forget that Jeff was a bigger punk-rock fan than a country fan. It led to things like us all switching instruments on "Misunderstood," where I'm playing guitar.

Wilco recorded a number of songs with this theme, including "Sunken Treasure" and "Hotel Arizona." Wilco also recorded some songs in the style of A.M. Wilco named the album Being There after a Peter Sellers film of the same name. The band went through some personnel changes during the recording sessions. Max Johnston left the band because he felt that his role in the band had diminished in favor of Bennett; he had also been replaced by violinist Jesse Greene on one track because the band felt that Johnston was unable to play the part. Bob Egan of Freakwater briefly joined the band in the studio, playing pedal steel guitar on "Far, Far Away" and "Dreamer in My Dreams", and then became an official member in September 1996.

Unlike the A.M. recording sessions, the band had no desire to produce a hit song from their second effort. The recording sessions produced nineteen songs, too many for a single album release. Tweedy was concerned about the high retail price that a double album would be sold for (at least $30), so he asked Reprise Records to release it as a double album at a single album price ($17.98 or less). Reprise agreed to this on the terms that they received Wilco's share of the album royalties. It was estimated in 2003 that the band lost almost $600,000 on the deal, but Tweedy was satisfied. Being There was well received by critics from several major media outlets, including Rolling Stone. The album reached number 73 on the Billboard album charts, a significant improvement from A.M., and placed fourteenth on the Pazz & Jop Critics Poll for 1996. The album's single "Outtasite (Outta Mind)" became the group's first song to enter the Billboard charts, reaching number 39 on the Modern Rock Tracks chart and number 22 on the Mainstream Rock Tracks chart.

=== Summerteeth and the Mermaid Avenue sessions (1997–2000) ===
In November 1997, Wilco entered Willie Nelson's recording studio in Spicewood, Texas to record a third studio album. The album was lyrically inspired by the marital problems of Tweedy and his wife, as well as by twentieth-century literature. Tweedy relied heavily on Bennett to provide music for the singer's "bold, but depressing" lyrics. Wilco recorded several songs, including "Via Chicago" and "She's a Jar", but began working on another project before assembling the tracks into an album.

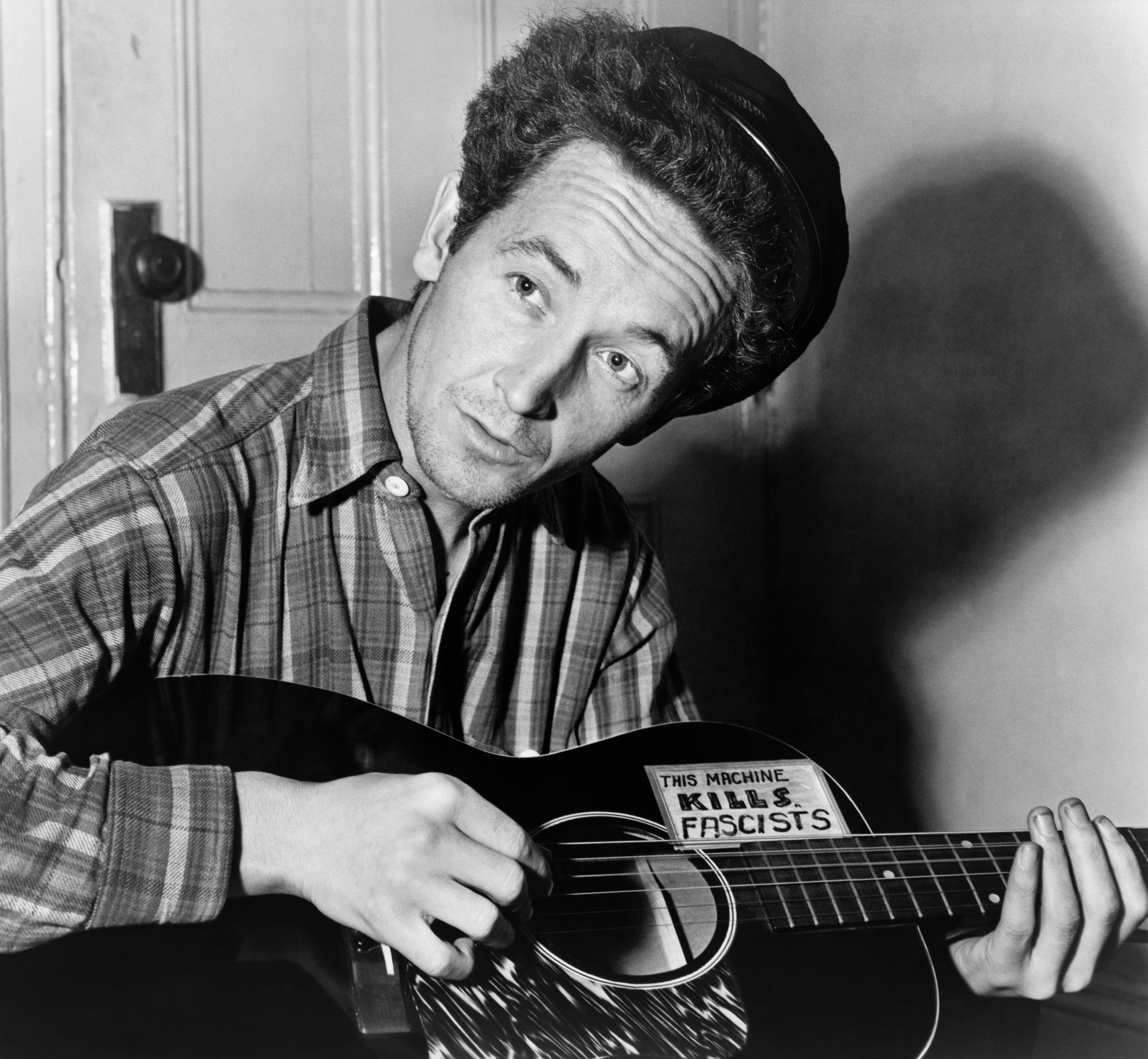
The two Mermaid Avenue albums are recordings of unreleased Woody Guthrie (pictured) songs

Nora Guthrie contacted singer-songwriter Billy Bragg in spring 1995 about recording some unreleased songs by her father, folk singer Woody Guthrie. Most of the songs were written late in Guthrie's life when he was unable to record due to the motor impairments of Huntington's disease. By the 1990s, Woody Guthrie had become a "relic" to the MTV generation, and Nora sought to establish a different legacy for the musician. To Nora, Bragg was "the only singer I knew taking on the same issues as Woody." Bragg was concerned, however, that his fans would not realize that the songs were written by Guthrie when he performed them on tour, so he decided to record the album with another band.

Bragg contacted Tweedy and Bennett about co-recording the album while Wilco was on the European segment of their Being There tour. Bragg was particularly fond of Being There because their influences extended farther back than the 1950s. Although Tweedy was indifferent to the offer, Bennett was enthused about recording songs with one of his idols—Bennett's previous band Titanic Love Affair was named after a Billy Bragg lyric. A recording contract between Bragg and Wilco was signed after a show at Shepherd's Bush Empire. Bragg mostly recorded the politically charged lyrics, while Tweedy preferred to record lyrics that showcased Guthrie as a "freak weirdo." The recording of Mermaid Avenue began on December 12, 1997, and was the topic of BBC's Man in the Sand documentary film.

Tempers flared between Bragg and Wilco after the album was completed. Bennett believed that Bragg was overproducing his songs, a sharp contrast to Wilco's sparser contributions. Bennett called Bragg about the possibility of remixing Bragg's songs, to which Bragg responded "you make your record, and I'll make mine..." Eventually Bragg sent copies of his recordings to Chicago for Bennett to remix, but Bragg refused to use the new mixes on the album. The two parties were unable to establish a promotional tour and quarreled over royalties and guest musician fees.

Despite these conflicts, the album was released on June 23, 1998, and sold over 277,000 copies. The album received rave reviews from Robert Christgau and Rolling Stone, and was nominated for a Grammy Award for Best Contemporary Folk Album. It also placed fourth on the Pazz & Jop critics poll for 1998. After the album was released, Bob Egan was replaced by multi-instrumentalist Leroy Bach.

After the completion of the Mermaid Avenue sessions, Wilco returned to Spicewood to complete their third studio album, Summerteeth. Unlike previous Wilco and Uncle Tupelo recordings, the album featured a lot of overdubbing with Pro Tools. Stirratt and Coomer were concerned with the production, since it reduced their involvement in the music. According to Stirratt:

The story of Summerteeth is Jay bought a Mellotron and he was going to use it, no matter what. It was lovely, but it was overdone. Once they got going on the overdubs, they didn't stop. And nobody in the band stepped up to stop the madness ... It reminds me of Heart of Darkness, where you knowingly extend the creative process for the purpose of exploration or redemption, or whatever it is you're looking for.

During 1999, Warner Brothers was looking to help repay a $16 billion debt acquired during the recent merger of parent company Warner Communications with Time Inc. As a result, Warner's imprints were under pressure to produce musical acts that would yield hit records. The head of Reprise, Howie Klein, who had previously authorized the release of Being There as a double album, was willing to let Wilco produce Summerteeth without label input. When Klein played the album for Reprise's A&R department, however, they demanded a radio single for the album. Wilco agreed to do this "once and once only" and recorded a radio-friendly version of "Can't Stand It" at the request of David Kahne, the head of the A&R department. The single version of "Can't Stand It" failed to cross over from Triple-A radio to alternative rock stations. The album sold only 200,000 copies, significantly less than Being There despite critical acclaim; the album placed eighth on the Pazz & Jop critics' poll for 1999.

After the release of Summerteeth, the band resumed the Mermaid Avenue sessions. Although they had recorded enough material for a second release in 1998, Wilco recorded a few new songs for Mermaid Avenue Vol. II. "Someday Some Morning Sometime," featuring a vibraphone filtered through a space echo, was identified by Tweedy as being the "piece to the puzzle" towards the creation of their fourth studio album. The album was released on May 30, 2000, and was the last release from the sessions. The remainder of the sessions were released in 2012 as Mermaid Avenue Vol. III, also part of Mermaid Avenue: The Complete Sessions.

=== Departure from Reprise Records and Yankee Hotel Foxtrot (2001–2002) ===
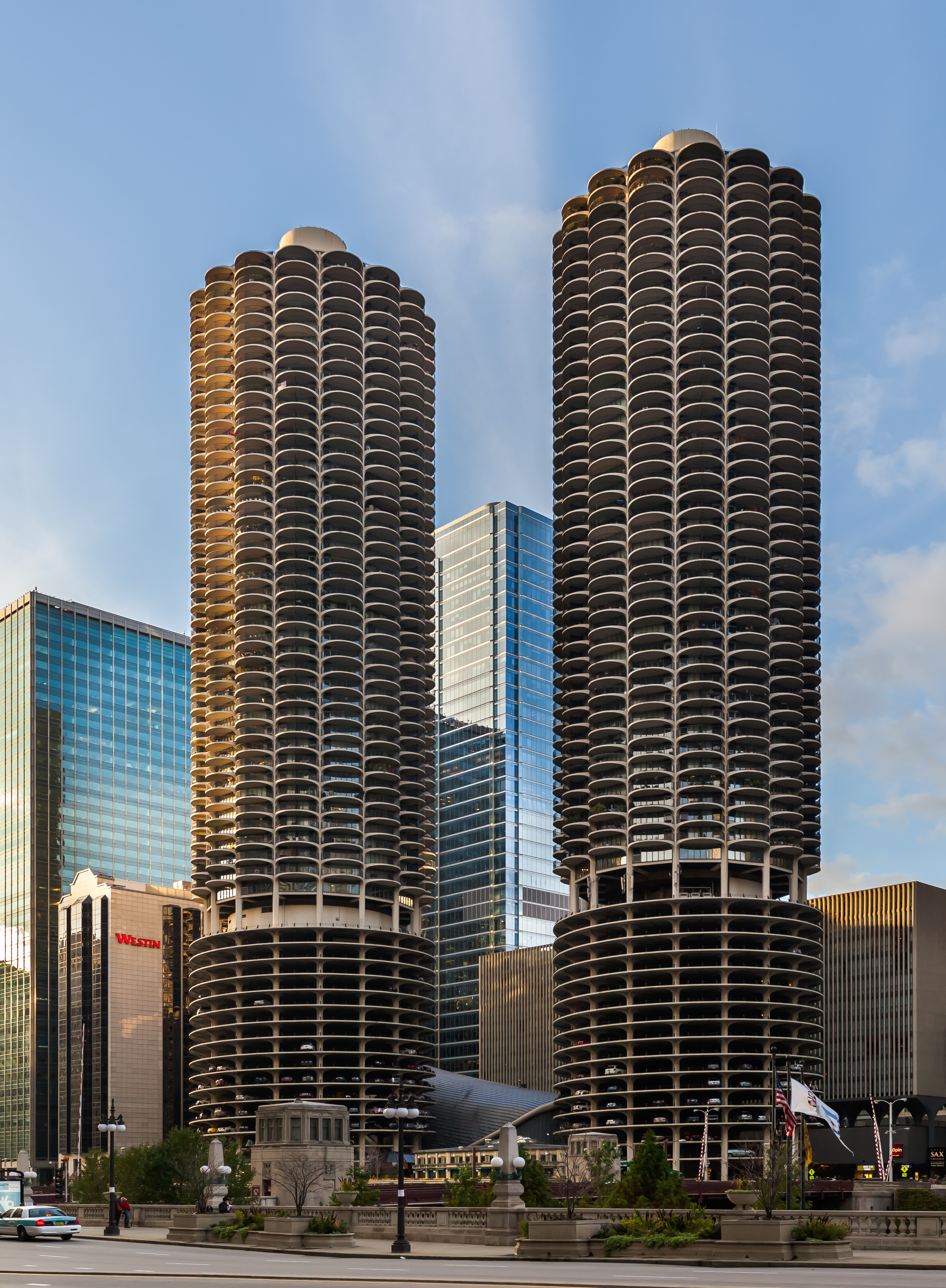
The Marina Towers in Chicago are depicted on the cover of Yankee Hotel Foxtrot.

"I Am Trying to Break Your Heart"
The first track from Yankee Hotel Foxtrot, this song featured an intro on bells composed by Glenn Kotche.

Shortly after the recording sessions for Mermaid Avenue Vol. II, Wilco purchased a studio on Irving Park Road in Chicago, which they named the Wilco Loft. The band recorded tracks in the studio in early 2000 for a fourth studio album. In May 2000, Jeff Tweedy requested to perform with Jim O'Rourke at a festival in Chicago; Tweedy was a fan of O'Rourke's Bad Timing. O'Rourke introduced Tweedy to drummer Glenn Kotche, and the trio enjoyed working together so much that they decided to record an album as a side project named Loose Fur. Wilco had recorded an entire album of music at this point, but Tweedy was unhappy with the drum parts. He enjoyed Kotche's contributions to Loose Fur so much that Tweedy brought him into the studio to re-record some demos. Some believe that Tweedy sought to make Wilco sound like Loose Fur after officially replacing Ken Coomer with Kotche in January 2001.

Although Bennett sought to be the mixer and engineer for Yankee Hotel Foxtrot, Tweedy was unsure of Bennett's abilities compared to O'Rourke. Tweedy and Bennett frequently argued over whether the album should be accessible to a general listener, or attempt to cover new musical ground. Unbeknownst to Bennett, Tweedy invited O'Rourke to remix "I Am Trying to Break Your Heart", and the results impressed the other band members—even Bennett. Tensions grew between Bennett and O'Rourke because Bennett wanted to mix every song on the album. O'Rourke cut the contributions of other members on several of the songs; some songs, such as "Poor Places", only featured the Loose Fur trio. O'Rourke would later claim he replaced no parts, though he does admit to recording additional "bridge" sections with the trio in order to accommodate his and Tweedy's arrangement tweaks done to the tracks during the mixing process. He specifically mentioned "Poor Places" as the most affected song on the album, though he only credits the final section as the work of Loose Fur, excluding the noise which he credits to Bennett. The album was completed in 2001, and Bennett was dismissed from the band immediately afterwards. The recording of the album was documented by Sam Jones and released in 2002 as the film I Am Trying to Break Your Heart: A Film About Wilco.

Time Warner, which owned Warner Bros. Records, merged with America Online in 2001, leading to more pressure on Warner's record labels to cut costs. Over 600 employees of Warner Music Group were fired, including Howie Klein, the president of Reprise Records.

David Kahne became the interim head of Reprise. Kahne assigned Mio Vukovic to monitor the progress of Yankee Hotel Foxtrot and to offer suggestions. Music journalist Greg Kot claims that Vukovic disliked the album and was unhappy that Wilco ignored his suggestions. He brought the album to Kahne, who felt that there was no single on the album. In June 2001, the album was rejected by Reprise and Wilco was asked to leave the label.

Wilco managed to negotiate a buy-out from Reprise. Music journalist Greg Kot claims that instead of financial compensation, the band agreed to leave the label with the master tapes of Yankee Hotel Foxtrot. The label was already receiving bad publicity for its treatment of the band and were willing to accommodate Wilco's request. However, AllMusic claims "Warner/Reprise agreed to sell them the masters for a reported $50,000" after Wilco was "unwilling to change the album to make it more 'commercially viable'." In a last-minute decision, the label freed Wilco from their contract and gave them the album at no charge. Curbing the negative publicity, Warner Music Group began to invest more in bands including The Flaming Lips. Lead singer Wayne Coyne remarked:

We are benefiting from the label's regret over Wilco. We are living in the golden age of that being such a public mistake. The people on Warners said, "we'll never have a band like Wilco feel we don't believe in them again." They'd tell me that it would never happen to us. And what a great day for me!

As the band searched for a new label to release the album, they decided to stream it on their official website to discourage illegal trading of low-quality MP3s. The band signed with Nonesuch Records, another Time Warner subsidiary, and the album was released in the spring of 2002. When it was released, Yankee Hotel Foxtrot reached number 13 on the Billboard 200, Wilco's highest chart position to that date. Yankee Hotel Foxtrot sold over 590,000 copies, and to date remains Wilco's best-selling album. Yankee Hotel Foxtrot was met with extensive critical acclaim: it topped 2002's Pazz & Jop critics' poll and was named one of the 100 greatest albums of all time by Q Magazine. Rolling Stone rated it at number 493 of their 500 Greatest Albums of all Time, in May 2012. In the 2020 reboot of the list, its ranking was raised to number 225.

In September 2022 the band released a variety of reissues of the album, including an 11-LP "Super Deluxe" version. The reissue won a Grammy for Best Historical Album.

=== Down with Wilco, A Ghost Is Born, and Kicking Television (2003–2005) ===
While waiting for the commercial release of Yankee Hotel Foxtrot, Wilco agreed to support R.E.M. collaborator Scott McCaughey for an album release by The Minus 5. They scheduled a recording session for September 11, 2001, but were distraught about the 9/11 terrorist attacks that day. Later that day, Wilco and McCaughey agreed to "create something good in the world right now" and record some material. Influenced by Bill Fay's Time of the Last Persecution, The Minus 5's Down with Wilco was released in 2003. Keyboardist Mikael Jorgensen, who had engineered Down with Wilco, joined Wilco in 2002 as they toured in support of Yankee Hotel Foxtrot.

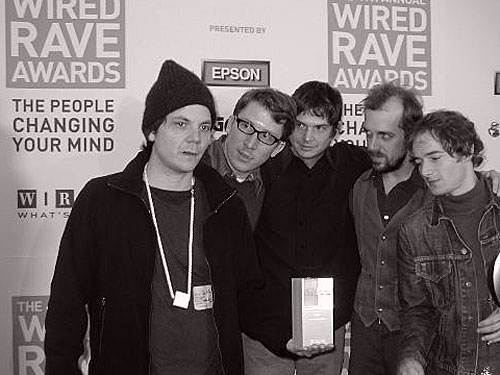
Wilco at the Wired Rave Awards in 2003

In November 2003, Wilco traveled to New York City to record their fifth album. The album was produced by Jim O'Rourke, who mixed Foxtrot and was a member of Wilco side project Loose Fur. Unlike Summerteeth and Yankee Hotel Foxtrot, A Ghost Is Born featured songs that were created with Pro Tools before ever performing them live. The album featured the song "Less Than You Think", which included a fifteen-minute track of electronic noises and synthesizers, which Tweedy called "the track that everyone will hate". Tweedy justified the inclusion of the song:

I know ninety-nine percent of our fans won't like that song, they'll say it's a ridiculous indulgence. Even I don't want to listen to it every time I play through the album. But the times I do calm myself down and pay attention to it, I think it's valuable and moving and cathartic. I wouldn't have put it on the record if I didn't think it was great ... I wanted to make an album about identity, and within that is the idea of a higher power, the idea of randomness, and that anything can happen, and that we can't control it.

Leroy Bach left the band immediately after the album's completion to join a music theatre operation in Chicago. Like Yankee Hotel Foxtrot, Wilco streamed the album online before its commercial release. Instead of using their own web page, the band streamed it in MPEG-4 form on Apple's website. Wilco decided to substantially change their lineup after Bach's departure adding Pat Sansone of The Autumn Defense, and avant-garde guitarist Nels Cline to the lineup. Just as the band was about to tour to promote the album, Tweedy checked himself into a rehabilitation clinic in Chicago for an addiction to opioids. As a result, tour plans for Europe were canceled, and the release date for the album was set back several weeks. A Ghost Is Born was released on June 22, 2004, and became Wilco's first top ten album in the U.S. The album earned Wilco Grammy Awards for Best Alternative Music Album and Best Recording Package in 2005. It also placed thirteenth on 2004's Pazz & Jop Critics Poll.

In 2004, the band released The Wilco Book, a picture book detailing the creation of A Ghost Is Born. The book also contains writings and drawings from band members, as well as a CD with demos from the A Ghost Is Born recording sessions. Also that year, Chicago Tribune music critic Greg Kot released a biography of the band entitled Wilco: Learning How to Die. The new six-piece Wilco lineup, which has remained intact ever since, debuted on Kicking Television: Live in Chicago, a two disc live album recorded at The Vic Theater in Chicago. Released on November 15, 2005, the album received high accolades from Spin, Billboard, and Entertainment Weekly. As of 2007 it has sold over 114,000 copies.

=== Sky Blue Sky (2006–2008) ===
John Stirratt discussing making Sky Blue Sky in 2007

Wilco returned to their loft in Chicago to record a sixth studio album in 2006. Influenced by The Byrds and Fairport Convention, the band considered Sky Blue Sky to be less experimental than previous releases. Also unlike on previous albums, the songs were created as collaborations.

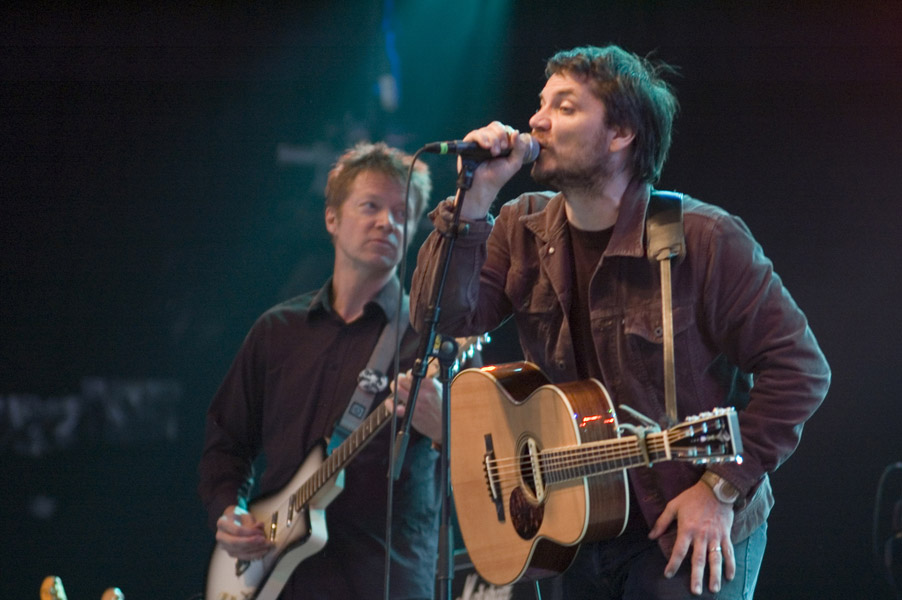
Wilco performing at the Roskilde Festival in 2007

Wilco streamed the album online on March 3, 2007, and offered the song "What Light" as a free MP3 download. Further publicizing the album, Wilco licensed several songs from the Sky Blue Sky recording sessions for use in a Volkswagen advertising campaign. The move was criticized by both critics and fans; Wilco responded by noting that they had previously done advertising campaigns with Apple Inc. and Telefónica Móviles (Movistar). The album was released on May 15, 2007, and was a commercial success: it sold over 87,000 copies in its first week and peaked in the top five in the U.S. album charts. It was a top forty hit in seven other countries.

Reviewer James Brubaker says that Wilco "shine[s] on a handful of the songs" on Sky Blue Sky, such as the "light, and straightforward" songs. While he calls it a "great traditional rock and folk album at times,...the rest of the record comes off at times as dull, and forced." A review in allaboutjazz also had mixed comments. While praising the album as "deceptively insinuating, almost intoxicating to listen to" and noting its "impeccable sound quality," the review said that "Sky Blue Sky becomes the first Wilco album that sounds too careful for its own good."

Pabs Hernandez, a reviewer for Lost at Sea, praised the album's "breezy atmosphere and pacing," and noted that it is not "easily judged upon first listen." Overall, Hernandez mentioned that it "may be no masterpiece, but at worst it's a more than worthy entry into Wilco's laudable catalogue." Reviewer Greg Locke praised the record as "one of the best albums of the year," calling it a "timeless record, full of sweet, hopeful sophistication and class" and "a lean, mean, soulful album." Like Hernandez, Locke acknowledged that the album could not be properly judged just on the first listening. The NPR review also had a positive take on the record. While the NPR reviewer stated that the recording "isn't groundbreaking," they praised its "coherent musical expression" and emphasis on "solid songcraft without pretense" which created a "satisfying and melodically sound album."

In anticipation of the 2008 US presidential election, Wilco released a downloadable version of Bob Dylan's "I Shall Be Released" that they performed with Fleet Foxes. The MP3 was available as a free download from the band's website in exchange for a promise to vote in the election. The band also made an appearance on The Colbert Report to support presidential candidate Barack Obama. Wilco released a live performance DVD, Ashes of American Flags, on April 18, 2009, to celebrate Record Store Day.

In December 2008, Jeff Tweedy, Pat Sansone, Glenn Kotche, and John Stirratt traveled to Auckland, New Zealand to participate in Neil Finn's 7 Worlds Collide sequel project, The Sun Came Out, joined by Ed O'Brien, Phil Selway, Johnny Marr, KT Tunstall, Liam Finn, and Lisa Germano. They wrote and recorded several new tracks for the Oxfam-benefiting album including "You Never Know," "What Could Have Been," "Over and Done," and "Don't Forget Me." Jeff Tweedy co-wrote "Too Blue" with Johnny Marr, and Glenn, John, and Pat play on most tracks on the album.

The band stayed in Auckland through January recording for their next album at Finn's own Roundhead Studios. Jim Scott, who was the engineer and mixer for the Neil Finn project, stayed on in the same capacity for the Wilco sessions. Nels Cline and Mikael Jorgensen later added overdubs to the tracks at the band's Chicago Loft.

=== Wilco (The Album), founding dBpm Records, and The Whole Love (2009–2011) ===
Wilco released their seventh album, Wilco (The Album), on June 30, 2009. In March 2009, it was announced that singer-songwriter Feist would make a guest appearance on the new album, on the track "You and I". As with their previous three albums, Wilco streamed the entirety of the album on its website prior to release. The album hit the charts at a career-high number 4 with sales of 99,000 on the Billboard Top 200 Album chart as well as the number 2 spot on Billboard's Top Rock Albums chart. It marked Wilco's third top 10 album on the U.S. pop chart. The album's first single "You Never Know" reached the number 1 spot on the AAA Chart, their first number 1 in twelve years.

Beginning in April 2009, the band freely distributed a cover of Woody Guthrie's "The Jolly Banker", downloadable from their website. It was recorded at the Wilco loft in February of that year, at the suggestion of Guthrie's daughter, Nora. Those downloading the album were encouraged to donate to the Woody Guthrie Foundation. Feist returned to accompany on the track, playing the Garden Weasel. The track eventually became unavailable for download. In October 2011, the website began streaming the track via a plugin.

On May 25, 2009, former band member Jay Bennett died in his home in Urbana, Illinois. In a prepared statement, Jeff Tweedy said that he was "deeply saddened" by Bennett's death.

Feist and Wilco performed "You and I" on Late Show with David Letterman on July 14, 2009. In June during their West Coast tour, Wilco joined Beck, Feist, Jamie Lidell and James Gadson in the studio to take part in Beck's Record Club project, covering Skip Spence's Oar album. The first song "Little Hands" was posted on Beck's website on November 12, 2009.

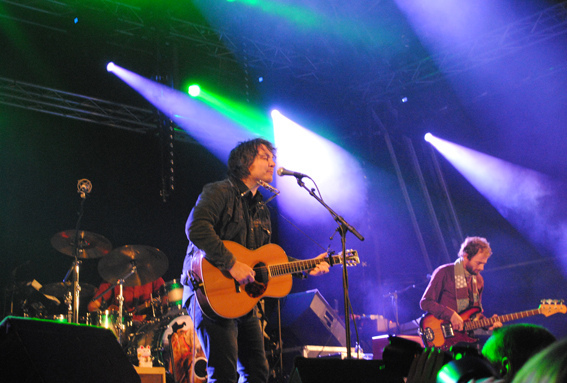
Wilco performing at the End of the Road Festival in 2010

On April 6, 2010, Wilco announced during their Boston performance that they would be headlining and curating a festival in North Adams, Massachusetts, dubbed Solid Sound Festival. The event ran at the Massachusetts Museum of Contemporary Art from August 13–15, and featured various Wilco side projects, including The Autumn Defense, Pronto, The Nels Cline Singers, and Jeff Tweedy solo. Other bands who appeared included Mavis Staples, Avi Buffalo, Outrageous Cherry, Richard Bishop, the Books, and Vetiver. It also featured non-musical media, such as the Bread and Puppet Theater and comedians Todd Barry, Kristen Schaal, John Mulaney, and Hannibal Buress as well as interactive musical installations by Cline and Kotche. In November 2016, the band also curated their own program during the tenth Anniversary Edition of Le Guess Who? Festival in Utrecht, The Netherlands. This curated program includes performances by amongst others Tortoise, Bassekou Kouyaté, Lee Ranaldo, Fennesz, Steve Gunn, William Tyler, and The Cairo Gang.

Wilco's contract with Nonesuch ended in 2010 and they formed their own label. Wilco announced via their web site and Twitter page on January 27, 2011 that the new label would be called dBpm Records (Decibels per Minute) and would be run out of the offices of their manager, Tony Margherita, in Easthampton, Massachusetts.

Wilco released their eighth studio album, The Whole Love, on September 27, 2011. The first single of the album is titled "Art of Almost". The B-Side to "I Might" is a cover of Nick Lowe's 1977 song "I Love My Label". The single debuted at the Wilco's 2011 Solid Sound Festival at MassMoca and was met by positive reviews. The entire album was streamed live on Wilco's official website for 24 hours between September 3 and 4, 2011.

=== Star Wars, Schmilco, and Ode to Joy (2015–2021) ===
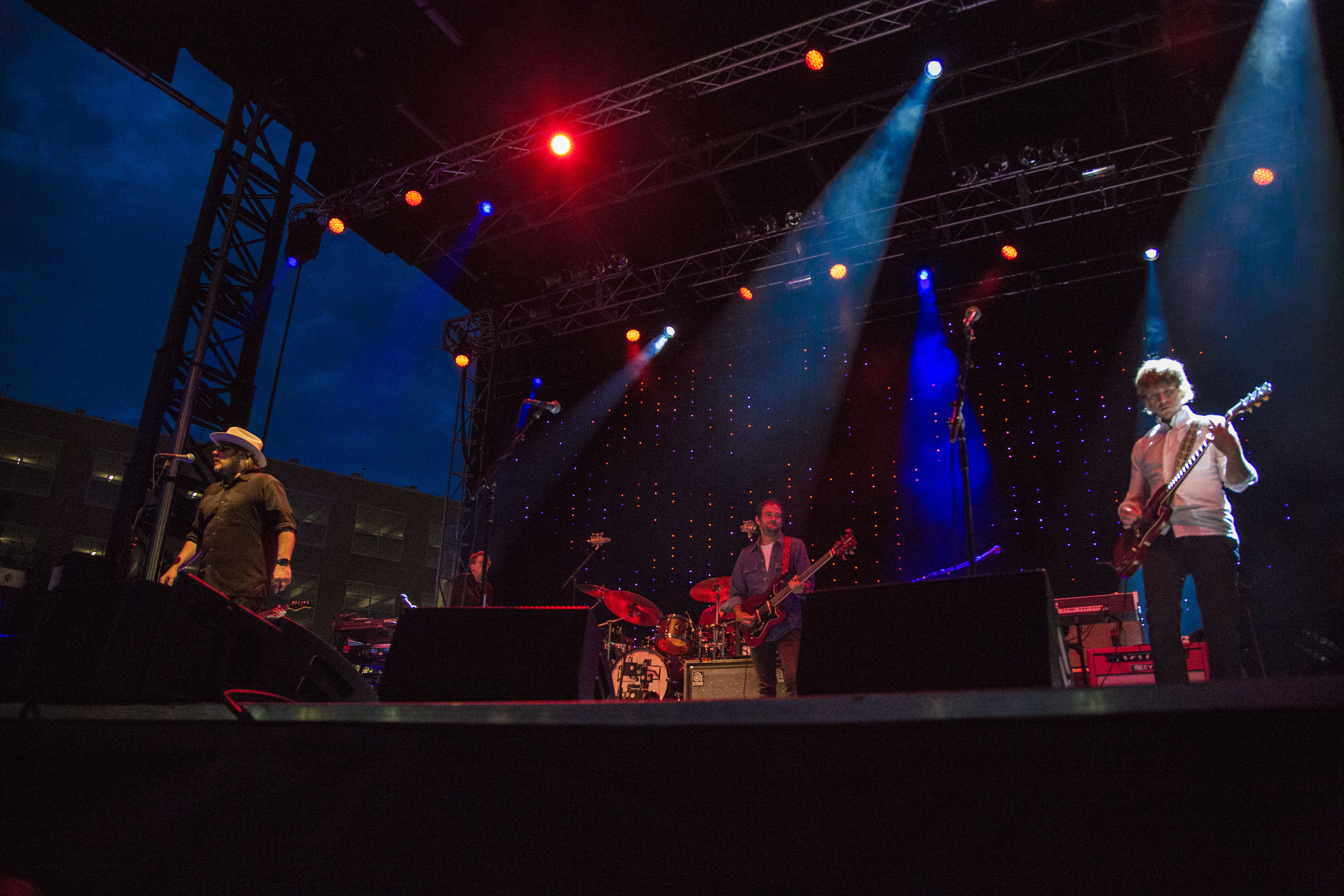
Wilco performing in Des Moines, Iowa, in 2015

Wilco released their ninth studio album, Star Wars, on July 16, 2015 as a surprise free download. In October 2015, Wilco announced that they would embark on a U.S. tour beginning in early 2016 in support of the album. In December 2015, Star Wars was nominated for the Grammy Award for Best Alternative Music Album.

On July 14, 2016, the band released a new single, titled "Locator," as a free download. Four days later, the band released another new single, titled "If I Ever Was a Child," and announced that their tenth album, Schmilco, would be released on September 9. Schmilco earned generally favourable reviews, earning a positive score of 79 on Metacritic, while reviewer Josh Modell said that the album is "Wilco's most musically simple and emotionally resonant record in a decade." On Monday, August 14, 2017, Wilco released a single, "All Lives You Say," on their Bandcamp page to benefit the SPLC in memory of Tweedy's father Robert, who died on August 4. Sharing the news Tweedy said, "My dad was named after a Civil War general, and he voted for Barack Obama twice. He used to say 'If you know better, you can do better.' America—we know better, we can do better."

Wilco took 2018 off from touring while Glenn Kotche lived in Finland after his wife Miiri received a Fulbright scholarship. The band announced an end to their performing hiatus and the release of the album Ode to Joy on July 16, 2019. The album was released on October 4, 2019 and received generally positive reviews with Will Hermes of Rolling Stone calling it their "best in years" and delivers "something like love shines through, and it winds up sounding joyful indeed, in a hard-won way." The album won the Grammy Award for best Special Limited Edition Package.

Wilco followed the release with an autumn tour, the tour later being extended into 2020. In March 2020, Wilco and Sleater-Kinney announced that over the summer they would be embarking on the co-headlining It's Time Tour. After the cancellation of the tour in the wake of the COVID-19 pandemic, Wilco and Sleater-Kinney eventually rescheduled the tour for the summer of 2021. In October 2021, Wilco was inducted into the Austin City Limits Hall of Fame for their multiple contributions to the live music series that airs on PBS.

During the COVID-19 lockdown, the band released the single "Tell Your Friends" on Bandcamp on May 20, 2020, with all proceeds benefiting World Central Kitchen. In July 2020, as a voice to the larger cultural discussion and protests surrounding the murder of George Floyd, Tweedy announced that 5% of all his writer royalties would be donated to a program that distributes the funds to organizations fighting for racial justice, saying that the modern music industry is "built almost entirely on black art" and that "the wealth that rightfully belonged to black artists was stolen outright and to this day continues to grow outside their communities."

=== Jay Bennett documentary, Cruel Country, and Cousin (2021–present) ===
In 2021, Where are you, Jay Bennett?, a feature-length documentary about the life of Jay Bennett was released. The film focused heavily on Bennett's years with Wilco. Directed by Gorman Bechard and Fred Uhter, the music documentary held its world premiere in Chicago in November 2021; it was released on Blu Ray and pay-per-view on April 19, 2022, and as part of a Record Store Day release with vinyl editions of Bennett's last two albums, Whatever Happened I Apologize and Kicking at the Perfumed Air on April 23, 2022.

"The new film does a wonderful job of capturing the quirkiness, inventiveness and brilliance of someone who never met an instrument he couldn't play. Bennett once described hearing the open spaces of the songs and holes that became his sonic landscape. They were at the core of the remarkable string of Wilco's albums Being There, Summerteeth, and Yankee Hotel Foxtrot."

The film was originally started by Uhter, who asked the prolific Bechard to take over the project when it stalled. It takes a hard look at Bennett's treatment in the previous Wilco documentary, I Am Trying To Break Your Heart, which some consider to be unfair. "Jay Bennett's reputation never quite recovered from the battering it took in Sam Jones' documentary I Am Trying To Break Your Heart: A Film About Wilco, about the complex, lengthy gestation of 2002's Yankee Hotel Foxtrot in often painful detail, portrayed a band slowly pulling itself apart, with chief songwriters Bennett and Jeff Tweedy its twin opposing forces. The implication being that Bennett was a headstrong, intractable figure responsible for most of the discord. He was sacked as soon as the album was done. Filmmakers Gorman Bechard and Fred Uhter seek to redress the balance on Where Are You, Jay Bennett?". The film painted a different picture of the relationship between Bennett and Tweedy. "They just happened to be two egos at that point, fueled by a lot of demons. And it just wasn't working anymore," Bechard explained. "They're both incredibly talented. They both had egos. They both, I think, saw maybe different paths for the band. And ultimately it was Jeff's band, so he's going to win that, and rightfully so. There were other issues, whether it be alcohol or drugs. You know, it was a little bit of everything. Personally, I wish they had stayed together because I think they could have literally become the next Lennon and McCartney or the next Jagger/Richards."

In April 2022, the band announced their twelfth studio album, Cruel Country, which they released on May 27. The album was recorded entirely in person in live sessions at The Loft, the first album since 2007's Sky Blue Sky. Tweedy described the album as saying, "We've never been particularly comfortable with accepting [...] the idea that I was making country music. But now, having been around the block a few times, we're finding it exhilarating to free ourselves within the form, and embrace the simple limitation of calling the music we're making country."

In August 2023, the band announced their thirteenth studio album, Cousin, which they released on September 29. Welsh musician Cate Le Bon produced the album.

On May 29, 2024, the band announced a new EP, Hot Sun Cool Shroud. It was released on June 28.

On May 16, 2025, the band released a new live album, Wilco Live (Orange). It was followed on June 20, 2025, by Wilco Live (Blue).

In August 2025, the band embarked on a North American tour titled An August Evening with Wilco, followed by South American and European legs. Many of the dates feature no supporting act and contained two full Wilco sets with a brief intermission.

== Musical style and influence ==
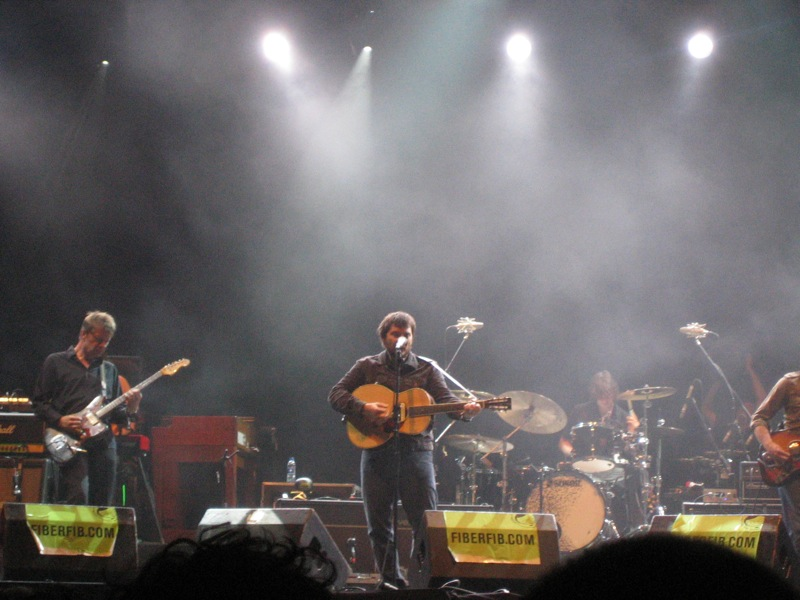
Wilco performing in support of Sky Blue Sky at Festival Internacional de Benicàssim on July 20, 2007

Mark Deming of AllMusic described Wilco's early releases as "rough-and-tumble alt-country" and their later releases as "mature and eclectic." Although they have a career-long association with a major record label, Wilco are generally associated with indie rock. The band has additionally been described by journalists as alternative rock, alt-country, art rock, experimental rock, and folk rock. Wilco draws influence from bands from a variety of musical genres, but primarily from music created between 1966 and 1974. John Cale's Paris 1919 was credited by the band as providing a musical parallel. According to Tweedy, "It was eye-opening that I wasn't the only person that felt like these worlds had a lot more in common than they'd been given credit for—that experimentation and avant-garde theory was not directly opposed to beauty, y'know?"

Other recording artists from the timespan cited as most influential by the band include John Lennon, Neil Young, and Brian Wilson. As a gift for his thirty-fourth birthday, Tweedy received a private guitar lesson from Richard Lloyd of Television; Tweedy was a fan of the group and was particularly fond of the guitar work, which he wanted to incorporate into his music. Uncle Tupelo was inspired by bands such as Jason & the Scorchers and the Minutemen, influencing the recording of Wilco's A.M.. Tweedy and O'Rourke enjoyed free jazz artists such as Ornette Coleman, Albert Ayler, and Derek Bailey; they also listen to mainstream jazz by artists such as Miles Davis and John Coltrane. The lyrical structure of Wilco's songs was dictated by classic literature and cadavre exquis—an exercise where band members take turns writing lines on a typewriter, but are only allowed to see the previously written line. Among the books that the band has cited as being stylistically influential include William H. Gass's In the Heart of the Heart of the Country, Henry Miller's Tropic of Cancer, and Harold Bloom's The Anxiety of Influence: A Theory of Poetry.

Some critics have dubbed Wilco the "American Radiohead," due to the band's stylistically diverse catalog. A critic from the New York Times argues that Wilco has a "roots-rock ... [sound which] reached back to proven materials: the twang of country, the steady chug of 1960s rock, the undulating sheen of the Beach Boys, the honky-tonk hymns of the Band and the melodic symmetries of pop."

Rolling Stone described Wilco as "one of America's most consistently interesting bands" and "America's foremost rock impressionists." Bands that Wilco has influenced include Derek Webb (of Caedmon's Call), the National, and Grace Potter and the Nocturnals. Adam Grunduciel of The War on Drugs calls Wilco his "Favorite modern day band." Norah Jones performed a cover of "Jesus, Etc." at the 2008 Bridge School Benefit where both Jones and Wilco performed; a version of the song was released as a bonus track on Jones' album The Fall in 2009. Counting Crows also covered the song "California Stars."

== Band members ==
Current members

- Jeff Tweedy – lead vocals, guitars, bass, harmonica (1994–present)
- John Stirratt – bass, guitar, keyboards, backing vocals (1994–present)
- Glenn Kotche – drums, percussion (2001–present)
- Mikael Jorgensen – samples and sound manipulation, keyboards, synthesizers, effects, piano, organ (2002–present)
- Nels Cline – guitars, lap steel (2004–present)
- Pat Sansone – keyboards, guitars, backing vocals, synthesizers, maracas, tambourine (2004–present)

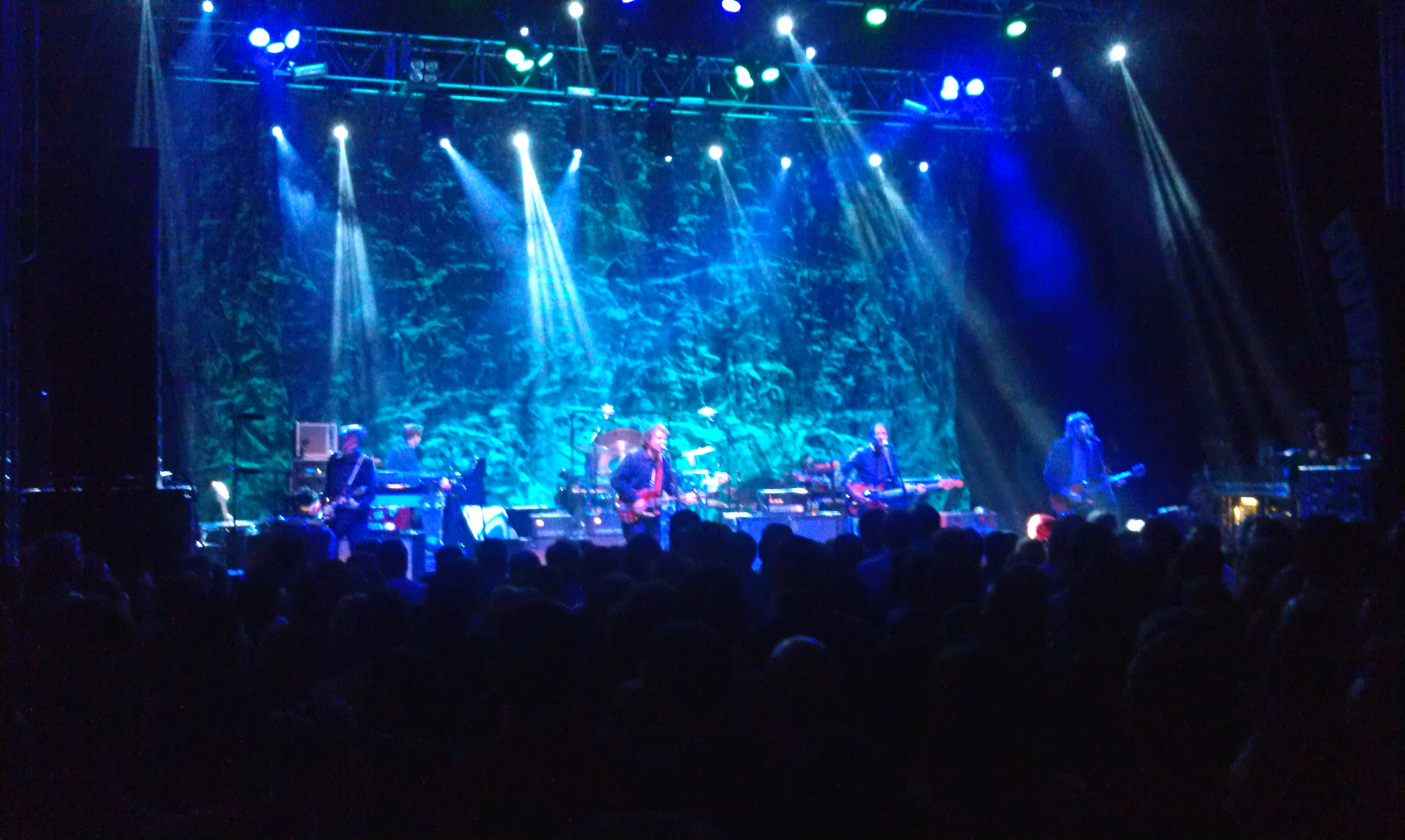
Wilco Second Night of Winterlude, December 6, 2014

Former members

- Ken Coomer – drums, percussion (1994–2001)
- Brian Henneman – guitar (1994–1995)
- Max Johnston – dobro, fiddle, banjo, mandolin, backing vocals (1994–1996)
- Jay Bennett – keyboards, guitars, drums, percussion, bass, harmonica, lap steel, banjo, backing vocals (1995–2002; died 2009)
- Bob Egan – pedal steel, slide guitar (1995–1998)
- Leroy Bach – guitar, keyboards, backing vocals (1998–2004)

== Discography ==
- A.M. (1995)
- Being There (1996)
- Summerteeth (1999)
- Yankee Hotel Foxtrot (2001)
- A Ghost Is Born (2004)
- Sky Blue Sky (2007)
- Wilco (The Album) (2009)
- The Whole Love (2011)
- Star Wars (2015)
- Schmilco (2016)
- Ode to Joy (2019)
- Cruel Country (2022)
- Cousin (2023)
