= Cousin (album) =

Studio album by Wilco
- Released: September 29, 2023
- Recorded: January 2019 – May 2023
- Studio: The Loft, Chicago, Illinois, United States
- Genre: Art pop; art rock; indie rock
- Length: 42:54
- Label: dBpm
- Producer: Cate Le Bon

Wilco chronology
Cruel Country (2022)	Cousin (2023)	Hot Sun Cool Shroud (2024)

Singles from Cousin
- 1. "Evicted" Released: August 1, 2023; 2. "Cousin" Released: September 14, 2023

"There aren't a whole lot of white male rock groups that feel vibrant in any way to me. I don't know what they're singing about. I don't know what they're angry about. I don't know what they care about other than maintaining and protecting their status, and I don't want that to be the way Wilco looks at itself. It felt really right to ask a woman to produce a record for us because it was an honest way to surrender some of those assumptions."

—Vocalist Jeff Tweedy on working with Cate Le Bon to produce Cousin

Cousin is the thirteenth studio album by the American rock band Wilco, released on September 29, 2023, by dBpm Records. The album was produced by Cate Le Bon, representing the first time the band used an outside producer in over a decade since 2009's Wilco (The Album), and was preceded by two singles: "Evicted" and the title track. The album has received positive reviews from critics.

== Recording and release ==
Recording for Cousin came at a time of particular productivity for Wilco frontman Jeff Tweedy. Cate Le Bon discouraged the band from live in-studio recording and instead recorded instruments individually, growing from 2019 demos recorded by Tweedy. Band members would play together and then split up to focus on their individual instruments, for instance, Le Bon worked with multi-instrumentalist Nels Cline for two days recording solo parts. Tweedy asked her to produce the album after the two met at a live performance, in spite of having no intention of bringing in an outside producer. Once she agreed, the duo discussed over the phone what the sound would be for the album and traded digital files of several dozen songs before going into the studio. Out of thirtysomething tracks, Le Bon narrowed it down to 14 to work on, with "Ten Dead" additionally written during the recording sessions. During recording, Le Bon had extensive thoughts on how each instrument and musician should sound and the band members were deferential to her preferences. Wilco also recorded and released Cruel Country in 2022 in order to take more time to finish the music on Cousin. Additionally, Le Bon's band recorded in Wilco's Loft studio and she formed a friendship with Tweedy.

== Reception ==
Professional ratings
Aggregate scores
Source	Rating
AnyDecentMusic?	7.8/10
Metacritic	82/100
Review scores
Source	Rating
AllMusic	4/5 stars
Exclaim!	8/10
The Guardian	4/5 stars
Mojo	4/5 stars
Paste	6.8/10
Pitchfork	7.1/10
PopMatters	7/10
Record Collector	4/5 stars
Slant Magazine	3.5/5 stars
Uncut	4.5/5 stars

Editors at AnyDecentMusic? aggregated 19 reviews to score this release a 7.8 out of 10. According to the review aggregator Metacritic, Cousin received "universal acclaim" based on a weighted average score of 82 out of 100 from 16 critic scores.

Editors at AllMusic rated this album 4 out of 5 stars, with critic Mark Deming writing "Cousin represents a genuine shift for the band as they've ceded some control over their recording process for a change", resulting in "a powerful, affecting work that once again shows how many great things Wilco can do". Scott Bauer of the Associated Press called this "a deeply layered, musically rich record" where "the soundscape is so thick it feels like an aural impressionist painting, with layer upon layer of music melded together to create a sonic image". In the Indie Basement column at BrooklynVegan, Bill Pearis chose this as one of the best albums of the week, telling readers who have not listened to Wilco in years that this is a reason to check in on their new work. Exclaim!' Clay Geddert rated this album an 8 out of 10 for showing "a fresh perspective on what their sound could be". Ryan Dillon of Glide Magazine praised this music for "Wilco's most complex and evocative album in years" and blending artsy or avant-garde tendencies with accessible songwriting and he chose "Sunlight Ends" as one of the best songs of the week, calling it "a moody example of the band's experimentation, an electronic drum pattern sets the tone for dancing guitar strings and sinfully sweet vocals".

The Guardian's Alexis Petridis proclaimed Cousin album of the week and gave it 4 out of 5 stars, stating that "no one comes to a Wilco album looking for carefree emotional uplift, but the anxieties expressed here feel different, very much the product of a writer 20 years older than the author of Yankee Hotel Foxtrot". In Hot Press, John Walshe gave this album an 8 out of 10, noting that this period of the band's sound "eschews the punkier elements of their DNA in favour of a more laid-back, countrified tone" and this mid-tempo tone results in "another stellar album from a band who seem permanently at the peak of their powers.". Ed Power of Irish Examiner gave Cousin 4 out of 5 stars, characterizing the music: "it's catchy and often very warm but full of the avant-garde wrinkles that have led critics to herald the Chicago outfit America's answer to Radiohead". Lauren Murphy of The Irish Times gave the same score, calling it "Wilco's most progressive album in years, dappled with a sumptuous melancholic hue that drapes itself over songs such as Ten Dead and the sombre, minor chord swoon of Levee". A feature from Louder Sound saw Sam Walton calling this the best Wilco album since 2004's A Ghost Is Born and the choice to enlist Le Bon "the most elegant producer-led transformation of the past 25 years".

John Mulvey of Mojo rated Cousin 4 out of 5 stars, praising Le Bon as "a trusted interloper who can unlock new dimensions for this most reliable but restless of contemporary American bands". In The New Zealand Herald, Graham Reid called Cousin "a gently deft approach to the experimentation that they've explored". Writing for No Depression, Kyle Peterson calling this release not "a return to the grand statements of the late 1990s and early 2000s so much as a distinctive entry that still fits comfortably in the band's latter-day output". In Paste, Eric R. Danton expressed disappointment with this album, calling it "underwhelming" in spite of select tracks that are success. Writing for Pitchfork, Zach Schonfeld scored Cousin a 7.1 out of 10 for recalling the earlier experimental period of the band's history and writes that it and previous album Cruel Country "both peer out at a country infected with hypocrisy and moral rot"; editors at the site shortlisted this as one of the best albums of the week. At PopMatters, John Garratt expressed that the band both experimented but also "played it too safe" on Cousin, stating that, "when Wilco does get around to the surprising elements in Cousin, they pull them off with so much subtlety that you might miss them entirely".

Rolling Stone featured a favorable review from Will Hermes, where the critic praised the production and how "part of Wilco's magic is its mutability... and how artfully it always cleaves to Tweedy's narrative voice, one of the most companionable in modern song, even when he's channeling flawed characters, which he frequently is". In Slant Magazine, Thomas Bedenbaugh credited Le Bon for this album having a more experimental style than previous Wilco releases and rated Cousin 3.5 out of 5 stars. Michael Gallucci of Ultimate Classic Rock called this work an "aural tour de force", continuing that "the music, drifting among the avant-pop playground Wilco has spent the past two decades traversing, suits the occasionally despairing, often hopeful mood". In Uncut, Tom Pinnock scored Cousin 4.5 out of 5 stars, praising the production and writing that this music is "deliciously weird and intoxicatingly angular, but it still sounds like a Wilco album, not a Le Bon collaboration". Michael James Hall of Under the Radar scored this work an 8.5 out of 10, calling it "a complex and clever album". In the Wall Street Journal, Mark Richardson emphasized the continuity this album has with Wilco's previous work, writing that the production "seems to lend a welcome tint rather than change Wilco's palette" and calls this the best album by the band since "at least 2015's Star Wars".

Cousin in best-of lists
Outlet	Listing	Rank
AllMusic	Favorite Alternative & Indie Albums	—N/a
Irish Independent	The best international albums of 2023	11
Mojo	Mojo's Top 75 Albums of 2023	11
El País	The best music albums of 2023	11
Rolling Stone	The 100 Best Albums of 2023	73
Rolling Stone	The 40 Best Indie-Rock Albums of 2023	—N/a
Uncut	Uncut's Top 75 Albums of 2023	3
Under the Radar	Under the Radar's Top 100 Albums of 2023	15

Ultimate Classic Rock named "Evicted" the 18th best rock song of the year. Uncut editor Michael Bonner included this album on his list of the best of the year.

A 2024 ranking of all of Wilco's studio albums by Spin placed Cousin at 10 out of 15 and Al Shipley wrote that it "may have the most empty space of any Wilco album, pulling even further back from the restraint of Ode to Joy.

== Track listing ==
All songs written by Jeff Tweedy

1. "Infinite Surprise" – 5:43
2. "Ten Dead" – 3:55
3. "Levee" – 4:11
4. "Evicted" – 3:29
5. "Sunlight Ends" – 3:53
6. "A Bowl and a Pudding" – 4:03
7. "Cousin" – 4:11
8. "Pittsburgh" – 5:14
9. "Soldier Child" – 4:17
10. "Meant to Be" – 3:55

== Personnel ==
Wilco

- Nels Cline
- Mikael Jorgensen
- Glenn Kotche
- Pat Sansone
- John Stirratt
- Jeff Tweedy – lead vocals, additional production, packaging design

Additional personnel

- Ashwin Deepankar – technician
- Jared Dottorelli – technician
- Mark Greenberg – assistant engineering
- Euan Hinshelwood – saxophone
- Cate Le Bon – bass guitar, piano, synthesizer, backing vocals, production
- Bob Ludwig – mastering
- Azuma Makoto – artwork
- Tom Schick – engineering, mixing additional production
- Shiinoki Shunsuke – photography
- Spencer Tweedy – percussion, backing vocals
- Alexa Viscius – packaging design

== Charts ==
Chart performance for Cousin
Chart (2023)	Peak position
Australian Albums (ARIA)	60
Austrian Albums (Ö3 Austria)	60
Belgian Albums (Ultratop Flanders)	25
Belgian Albums (Ultratop Wallonia)	77
Dutch Albums (Album Top 100)	36
French Albums (SNEP)	189
German Albums (Offizielle Top 100)	21
Irish Albums (IRMA)	51
Scottish Albums (OCC)	11
Spanish Albums (PROMUSICAE)	21
Swiss Albums (Schweizer Hitparade)	18
UK Albums (OCC)	65
US Billboard 200	65

== See also ==
- 2023 in American music
- List of 2023 albums
