= Sam Jones (photographer) =

American photographer and film director

Sam Jones is an American photographer and film director known for his portraits of prominent public figures, including U.S. President Barack Obama, Sandra Bullock, George Clooney, Bob Dylan, Kristen Stewart, Robert Downey Jr., Amy Adams, and Jack Nicholson. His photography has appeared on the covers of publications such as Vanity Fair, Rolling Stone, Esquire, GQ, Time, Entertainment Weekly, and Men's Journal.

== Career ==
Jones's photos have received awards from American Photography and an Eisie award from Communication Arts and Life magazine. His image of the Marina City towers in Chicago on the cover of the 2002 Wilco album Yankee Hotel Foxtrot was included in the book The Greatest Album Covers of All Time.

His achievements as a documentarian include I Am Trying to Break Your Heart: A Film About Wilco in 2002, which began as a film about the making of Yankee Hotel Foxtrot but wound up chronicling the major-label pressures and internal drama the band was experiencing at the time. A collection of his candid celebrity portraiture, The Here And Now: The Photographs of Sam Jones, was published in 2007 by HarperCollins. Other published works include Non-Fiction, a collection of cinematic portraits; and Some Where Else, a photographic and musical collaboration with musician Blake Mills in 2015.

Jones has created national commercials for Skype, Sonos, Canon, Target, Dove and others. His music video for Foo Fighters' "Walk" won the Best Rock Video of the Year award at the 2011 MTV Video Music Awards. He has also directed videos for Mumford and Sons, Tom Petty, and John Mayer, among many others; including his multi-award-winning interactive video for Cold War Kids' "I've Seen Enough".

In 2013, Jones launched Off Camera with Sam Jones on DirecTV's Audience Network, which ran for 218 episodes through the end of 2019. The hourlong show featured long-form conversational interviews with artists, actors, and musicians including Robert Downey Jr., Sarah Silverman, Dave Grohl, Laura Dern, Tony Hawk, Matt Damon and Will Ferrell.

In 2014, Jones directed the feature-length Showtime documentary Lost Songs: The Basement Tapes Continued, which reexamines the creative output of Bob Dylan during the Basement Tapes era and documents new recordings of newly discovered Dylan lyrics from 1966-67 by Elvis Costello, Rhiannon Giddens and others at the Capitol Records Studios. The film features Bob Dylan as narrator, and the project, with a resultant album of the songs, has been termed a collaboration between contemporary musical artists and a 26-year-old Dylan.

Jones's work for television also includes directing episodes of the Bill Lawrence-created shows Cougar Town, Ted Lasso and Bad Monkey; as well as the HBO series Music Box and Smartless: On the Road, and the documentary Tony Hawk: Until the Wheels Fall Off.

== Selected works ==
- I Am Trying to Break Your Heart: A Film About Wilco (2002).
- Jones, Sam (2007). The Here And Now: The Photographs of Sam Jones. New York: HarperEntertainment. ISBN 978-0-06-134812-9.
- Off Camera with Sam Jones, series on DirecTV (2013-2019).
- Jones, Sam (2015). Some Where Else. Santa Monica, CA: Beware Doll. ISBN 978-0-692-35344-8.
