= Cruel Country =

Studio album by Wilco
- Released: May 27, 2022
- Recorded: February–March 2022
- Studios: The Loft, Chicago, Illinois, US
- Genre: Alt-country
- Length: 77:04
- Label: dBpm
- Producers: Jeff Tweedy; Tom Schick

Wilco chronology
Ode to Joy (2019)	Cruel Country (2022)	Cousin (2023)

Singles from Cruel Country
- 1. "Falling Apart (Right Now)" Released: April 28, 2022; 2. "Tired of Taking It Out on You" Released: May 10, 2022

Cruel Country is the twelfth studio album by the American rock band Wilco, released on May 27, 2022, by dBpm Records. A double album, Cruel Country sees the band fully embracing their country music leanings. It was supported with the release of two singles: "Falling Apart (Right Now)" and "Tired of Taking It Out on You". On release, the album received critical acclaim and debuted at number 190 on the US Billboard 200.

== Background ==
Cruel Country features twenty-one songs written by frontman Jeff Tweedy. The double album consists primarily of live takes recorded at The Loft, the band's recording studio in Chicago. It was recorded there in February and March 2022, with production handled by Tweedy and Tom Schick. The sessions included all six Wilco members together in The Loft for the first time since the recording of The Whole Love (2011). With minimal overdubbing, Tweedy compared their recording approach on Cruel Country to that which they last employed on Sky Blue Sky (2007).

== Music and themes ==
The album sees the band fully embracing their country music leanings. In a letter published upon the album's announcement, Jeff Tweedy wrote, "I think there's been an assumption over the years that Wilco is some sort of country band. There's a lot of evidence to support that way of thinking about our band because there have been elements of country music in everything we've ever done. But to be honest, we've never been particularly comfortable with accepting that definition of the music we make. With this album though, I'll tell you what, Wilco is digging in and calling it country." Tweedy explained that the genre provided an ideal space to explore United States history: "Because it is the country I love, and because it's country music that I love, I feel a responsibility to investigate their mirrored problematic natures. I believe it's important to challenge our affections for things that are flawed."

== Release and promotion ==
Tweedy first announced he was at work on a new Wilco album through his newsletter in February 2022. The album was officially announced on April 28, 2022, with the single "Falling Apart (Right Now)" released the same day. The second single, "Tired of Taking It Out on You", was released on May 10, 2022. The album was released digitally on May 27, 2022, by dBpm Records, with physical releases on CD and LP planned for a later date due to the supply chain crisis. The release of Cruel Country coincided with Wilco's Solid Sound Festival at MASS MoCA, where the band performed the album in its entirety. A double LP and a two-disc CD were finally released by dBpm Records on January 20, 2023.

== Critical reception ==
Professional ratings
Aggregate scores
Source	Rating
AnyDecentMusic?	7.9/10
Metacritic	83/100
Review scores
Source	Rating
AllMusic	4/5 stars
Clash	9/10
Exclaim!	8/10
Mojo	4/5 stars
NME	4/5 stars
The Observer	4/5 stars
Paste	7.9/10
Pitchfork	7.2/10
Rolling Stone	4/5 stars
Uncut	9/10

Cruel Country was met with critical acclaim. At Metacritic, which assigns a normalized rating out of 100 to reviews from professional publications, the album received an average score of 83, based on 17 reviews. Aggregator AnyDecentMusic? gave it 7.9 out of 10, based on their assessment of the critical consensus.

Jon Pareles of The New York Times deemed it an "understated magnum opus", writing, "A song can only do so much, and on Cruel Country Wilco offers no grand lesson or master plan, only observations, feelings and enigmas. Many of the album's best moments are wordless ones."

=== Year-end lists ===
Publication	List	Rank	Ref.
Mojo	The 75 Best Albums of 2022	15	
Rolling Stone	The 100 Best Albums of 2022	48	
Uncut	The Top 75 Albums of the Year	6	

== Track listing ==
All tracks are written by Jeff Tweedy.

Disc one
No.	Title	Length
1.	"I Am My Mother"	2:35
2.	"Cruel Country"	3:26
3.	"Hints"	3:38
4.	"Ambulance"	3:11
5.	"The Empty Condor"	3:53
6.	"Tonight's the Day"	3:26
7.	"All Across the World"	3:42
8.	"Darkness Is Cheap"	3:19
9.	"Bird Without a Tail/Base of My Skull"	5:04
10.	"Tired of Taking It Out on You"	3:36
11.	"The Universe"	3:33
Total length:		39:23

Disc two
No.	Title	Length
12.	"Many Worlds"	7:52
13.	"Hearts Hard to Find"	3:27
14.	"Falling Apart (Right Now)"	3:16
15.	"Please Be Wrong"	3:01
16.	"Story to Tell"	4:08
17.	"A Lifetime to Find"	4:07
18.	"Country Song Upside-Down"	2:46
19.	"Mystery Binds"	3:08
20.	"Sad Kind of Way"	2:48
21.	"The Plains"	3:08
Total length:		37:41

== Personnel ==
Wilco

- Jeff Tweedy – vocals (all tracks), acoustic guitar (all tracks), bass (2, 19), electric guitar (3, 9), synthesizer (3), production, packaging design
- John Stirratt – bass (1, 5–7, 9, 10, 12–20), backup vocals (1–3, 9, 10, 12–14, 16–18)
- Nels Cline – lap steel guitar (1, 2, 10, 13, 16, 18–20), electric guitar (2, 3, 5, 6, 9, 12, 13, 18–20), baritone guitar (2, 14), square neck dobro (7, 15, 17), twelve-string electric guitar (9)
- Glenn Kotche – drums (1–3, 5–7, 9, 10, 12–20), percussion (1, 2, 7, 10, 14, 16, 17, 20)
- Mikael Jorgensen – piano (1–3, 5–7, 9, 10, 13–15, 17–20), organ (2, 6, 9, 10, 12, 15–17, 19), synthesizer (13, 18, 20)
- Pat Sansone – 12-string electric guitar (1, 20), backup vocals (1, 2, 9–14, 16–18), B-Bender (2, 3, 9, 12, 14, 17, 19), Mellotron (3, 5, 6, 11–13, 15, 16, 18, 19), Wurlitzer electronic piano (6, 13, 15, 19), electric guitar (7, 10, 19), piano (8–10, 12, 13, 16), acoustic guitar (10, 13, 18), organ (12, 21), French horn arrangement (3, 8), French horn production (3, 8)

Additional personnel

- Jennifer Kummer – French horn (3, 8)
- Teddy Morgan – French horn engineering (3, 8)
- Tom Schick – production, engineering, mixing
- Mark Greenberg – engineering assistance, packaging design
- Bob Ludwig – mastering
- Lawrence Azerrad – packaging design
- Anastasia Antoinette – design production
- Tevi Schwartz – digital retouching
- Jessica Hirsche – type design
- Jamie Kelter Davis – band photos

== Charts ==
Chart performance for Cruel Country
Chart (2022–2023)	Peak position
Belgian Albums (Ultratop Flanders)	36
Dutch Albums (Album Top 100)	42
German Albums (Offizielle Top 100)	82
Scottish Albums (Official Charts)	12
Spanish Albums (Promusicae)	70
Swiss Albums (Schweizer Hitparade)	25
UK Americana Albums (Official Charts)	1
UK Album Downloads (Official Charts)	23
UK Independent Albums (Official Charts)	7
US Billboard 200	190
US Independent Albums (Billboard)	29
