= Man in the Sand =

1999 rockumentary

- Directed by: Kim Hopkins
- Produced by: Juliet De Valero Wills; Christopher Frederick
- Starring: Billy Bragg; Peter Jenner; Nora Guthrie; Jeff Tweedy; Jay Bennett; John Stirratt; Ken Coomer; Corey Harris; Natalie Merchant; Grant Showbiz
- Narrated by: Nora Guthrie
- Cinematography: Kim Hopkins
- Edited by: Simon Ardizzone
- Distributed by: BBC
- Release date: 1999
- Running time: 89 min.
- Language: English

Man in the Sand is a 1999 documentary that functions as both a biography of American folk singer-songwriter Woody Guthrie and a chronicle of the creation of the Billy Bragg & Wilco Mermaid Avenue albums (Vol. I (1998), Vol. II (2000), and Vol. III (2012)), which feature songs consisting of previously-unheard Woody Guthrie lyrics set to newly-created music.

== Synopsis ==
In 1995, Nora Guthrie asked English singer-songwriter Billy Bragg to create music to accompany lyrics written by her father, Woody Guthrie, decades earlier, and record an album. Bragg invited American band Wilco to back him on the recordings, and Jeff Tweedy and Jay Bennett from the band wrote music for additional Guthrie lyrics.

Throughout the film, Nora narrates the story of her father's life, while Bragg is seen traveling to various locations relevant to Woody Guthrie's life, such as Okemah, Oklahoma (his hometown), Pampa, Texas (where he met his first wife), and New York City (where he made his home after leaving California). Much time is also spent at the recording sessions with Bragg and Wilco in Chicago (December 1997) and Dublin (January 1998), and with Bragg and Natalie Merchant in Boston (March 1998), that produced most of the tracks for all three albums. Corey Harris also participated in the recording.

== Music ==
The following songs are featured in the film (in order of appearance):

- "Way Over Yonder in the Minor Key" – Words: Woody Guthrie (1946); Music: Billy Bragg (1997)
- "California Stars" – Words: Guthrie; Music: Jay Bennett/Jeff Tweedy (1997)
- "This Land Is Your Land" – Words & Music: Guthrie
- "Pastures of Plenty" – Words & Music: Guthrie
- "I Ain't Got No Home" – Words & Music: Guthrie
- "Here Comes the Train" – Words & Music: Corey Harris (1998)
- "Ingrid Bergman" – Words: Guthrie (1950); Music: Bragg (1996)
- "Ideology" – Words & Music: Bragg (1986)
- "Between the Wars" – Words & Music: Bragg (1985)
- "She Came Along to Me" – Words: Guthrie (1942); Music: Bragg/Tweedy/Bennett (1998)
- "Go Down to the Water" – Words: Guthrie (1945); Music: Bragg (1997)
- "Feed of Man" – Words: Guthrie; Music: Tweedy (1998)
- "Birds and Ships" – Words: Guthrie; Music: Bragg (1997)
- "Birds and Ships" – Words: Guthrie; Music: Tweedy (1997)
- "All You Fascists" – Words: Guthrie (1942); Music: Bragg (1997)
- "When the Roses Bloom Again" – Words: Will D. Cobb (1901); Music: Tweedy
- "The Unwelcome Guest" – Words: Guthrie (1940); Music: Bragg (1996)
- "I Was Born" – Words: Guthrie (1950); Music: Bragg (1996)
- "At My Window Sad and Lonely" – Words: Guthrie (1939); Music: Tweedy (1997)
- "Another Man's Done Gone" – Words: Guthrie; Music: Bragg (1998)
- "Hoodoo Voodoo" – Words: Guthrie; Music: Wilco/Bragg/Harris

The VHS release of the film came with a CD titled 'Mermaid Avenue' Demo's, which consisted of five of Bragg's demo recordings for the project (these recordings were also included on the DVD release of the film):

1. "Birds and Ships"
2. "She Came Along to Me"
3. "I Guess I Planted"
4. "Eisler on the Go"
5. "The Unwelcome Guest"

(All songs: words by Guthrie & music by Bragg)

== See also ==
- Mermaid Avenue (1998)
- Mermaid Avenue Vol. II (2000)
- Wonder Wheel (2006)
- Woody Guthrie's Happy Joyous Hanukkah (2006)
- The Works (2008)
- New Multitudes (2012)
- Mermaid Avenue: The Complete Sessions (2012)
