= Kicking Television: Live in Chicago =

Live album by Wilco
- Released: November 15, 2005
- Recorded: May 4–7, 2005
- Genre: Rock; art rock
- Length: 114:05
- Label: Nonesuch
- Producer: Wilco

Wilco chronology
| A Ghost Is Born (2004) | Kicking Television: Live in Chicago (2005) | Sky Blue Sky (2007) |

Kicking Television: Live in Chicago is a live album by Chicago alternative rock band Wilco, released on November 15, 2005, by Nonesuch Records. The album consists of material from four live shows at Chicago's Vic Theater recorded May 4, 2005 to May 7, 2005. Although the band filmed the concerts, they decided not to release the footage as a DVD. It was the band's first album with an expanded lineup featuring Nels Cline and Pat Sansone.

Kicking Television debuted on the Billboard 200 at number forty-seven, and has since sold over 114,000 copies. Critical reception to the album was generally positive. Publications such as The A.V. Club and Pitchfork lauded the band's performance of material from Yankee Hotel Foxtrot and A Ghost Is Born.

On April 17, 2010, for Record Store Day Wilco released an audiophile, 180-gram vinyl pressing of Kicking Television. The vinyl pressing, spread across four LP's, included eight previously unreleased tracks recorded in May 2005.

== Production ==
Shortly after the release of A Ghost Is Born, Wilco's fifth studio album, multi-instrumentalist Leroy Bach left the band to pursue a career in theater production. To replace him, the band added jazz rock guitarist Nels Cline and multi-instrumentalist Pat Sansone to their lineup. The lineup was expanded because lead singer Jeff Tweedy was concerned that the other members were multi-tasking on instruments. This made performing material live from Summerteeth and Yankee Hotel Foxtrot difficult. While touring in support of Ghost, Wilco decided to record their first live album.

Wilco decided to use concerts from their hometown of Chicago "because [they] wanted to be really comfortable". They chose a string of four consecutive shows from May 4 to May 7, 2005, at The Vic Theater in Chicago, Illinois. The band recorded the four shows on a 24-track digital recorder. The shows were filmed for a potential DVD release, but the band decided not to release the footage. According to Tweedy, the band was disappointed by how the footage "sapped" the energy out of the performances. On September 13, 2005, the band announced that the album would be released on November 1, 2005. The release date was later delayed two weeks.

Most of the material from the album—16 of 23 songs—is from Wilco's two Nonesuch Records releases: Yankee Hotel Foxtrot and A Ghost Is Born. The title track was an outtake from the Ghost recording sessions because the band considered it to be one of their most exciting songs live. Tweedy explained why it was chosen for the title:

A rock concert is "kicking television." If you're out of the house and with a bunch of people enjoying something together, that's kicking television to me. I don't think very many people, myself included, will ever kick television cold turkey, but I certainly think more people should be aware of what it's doing to them.

Two live tracks from Summerteeth were also included on the album, as well as one song each from Being There, Mermaid Avenue and Mermaid Avenue Vol. II. The final track was a cover of "Comment (If All Men Are Truly Brothers)", originally performed by Charles Wright & the Watts 103rd Street Rhythm Band.

Guitarist Jeff Tweedy provided the lead vocals for the album and John Stirratt, the only other original member of the band, played bass guitar and added backing vocals. Lead guitarist Nels Cline and multi-instrumentalist Pat Sansone performed here on a Wilco album for the first time. Glenn Kotche performed on the drums and other percussion instruments, and Mikael Jorgensen played keyboards. Other instrumentation was provided by Patrick Newbery (trumpet and flugelhorn), Nick Broste (trombone), and Rick Parenti (baritone sax).

== Release and reception ==
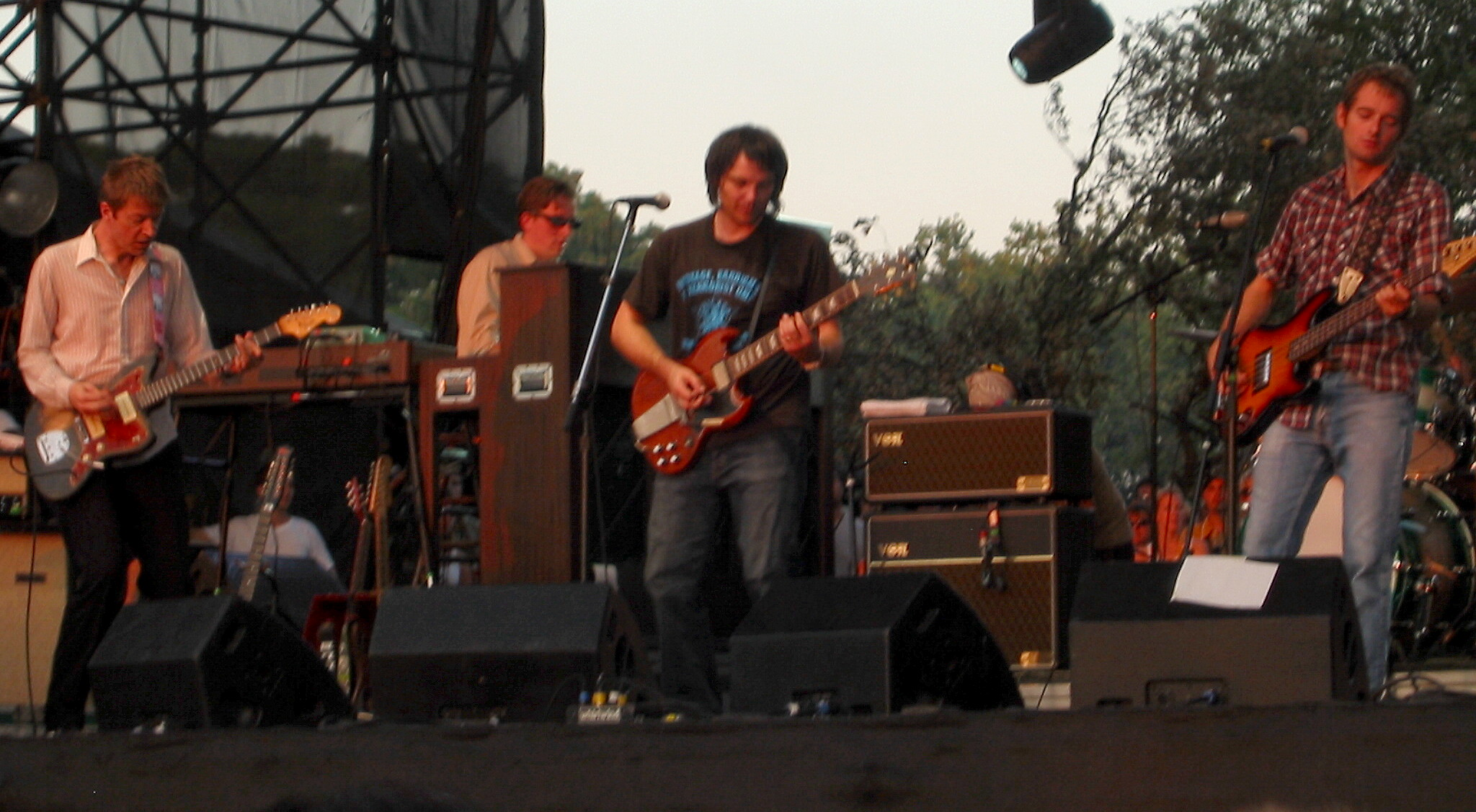
Wilco performing in 2004, shortly before the recording of Kicking Television.

Nonesuch Records released the album on November 15, 2005. The album debuted at number forty-seven on the U.S. Billboard 200 and spent two weeks on the chart. As of April 13, 2007, the album had sold over 114,000 copies.

Professional ratings
Aggregate scores
| Source | Rating |
|---|---|
| Metacritic | 85/100 |
Review scores
| Source | Rating |
| AllMusic | 4/5 stars |
| Blender | 4/5 stars |
| Entertainment Weekly | A− |
| Los Angeles Times | 3.5/4 stars |
| Mojo | 3/5 stars |
| Pitchfork | 8.3/10 |
| Q | 4/5 stars |
| Rolling Stone | 3.5/5 stars |
| Spin | A |
| Uncut | 4/5 stars |

Kicking Television was well received by critics; according to Metacritic, it was given a score of 85 out of 100 based on "universal acclaim". Scott Tobias of The A.V. Club called the album "stellar" and expressed surprise over how well the A Ghost Is Born songs sounded live. AllMusic editor Mark Deming lauded the "new muscle and force" of the songs, and commented on "the élan of this band in full flight shows," declaring that "the fun has been put back in Wilco." Marc Hogan of Pitchfork called the Yankee Hotel Foxtrot songs "still awesome" and remarked that "this is what A Ghost Is Born is supposed to sound like." Q said that "Live albums rarely come equipped with such a strong pulse" and later named the album one of the top 20 live albums of all time.

E! Online said that Wilco "[turn] each song up to 11 and [let their] rabid hometown fans provide thousand-strong backing vocals. It'll make you want to yell 'Woooh!' too." Spin stated: "Not since Grateful Dead's Europe '72 has there been a live double album in which intimacy and expansiveness, guitar mess and piano reflection commingle this sweetly." Billboard said that Wilco had "never sounded better". Ben Gilbert of Yahoo! Music UK stated that the album "documents a band on fire and a frontman in clarion clear voice." Under the Radar said the album "Captures a band at the height of their creative powers." Uncut said, "In this live setting, fascinatingly, the brutality to which the songs are subjected only serves to underscore their poignancy." Blender said it "sounds like a greatest hits set."

Although most reviews applauded the effort, critics also expressed discontent with elements of the album. Hogan noted in his Pitchfork review that Tweedy's banter was "ho-hum", and stated that "Kicking Television" and "The Late Greats" should have been cut from the album. Andrew Gaering of Stylus Magazine gave the album a B rating, but was disappointed with how the songs "find the band holding serve".

== Track listing ==
All songs were written by Jeff Tweedy, except where noted.

=== Disc one ===
| No. | Title | Writer(s) | Source | Length |
|---|---|---|---|---|
| 1. | "Misunderstood" | | Being There (1996) | 6:08 |
| 2. | "Company in My Back" | | A Ghost Is Born (2004) | 3:44 |
| 3. | "The Late Greats" | | A Ghost Is Born | 2:40 |
| 4. | "Hell Is Chrome" | Tweedy, Mikael Jorgensen | A Ghost Is Born | 4:56 |
| 5. | "Handshake Drugs" | | A Ghost Is Born | 6:23 |
| 6. | "I Am Trying to Break Your Heart" | | Yankee Hotel Foxtrot (2002) | 6:03 |
| 7. | "A Shot in the Arm" | Tweedy, Jay Bennett, John Stirratt | Summerteeth (1999) | 4:51 |
| 8. | "At Least That's What You Said" | | A Ghost Is Born | 5:18 |
| 9. | "Wishful Thinking" | Tweedy, Glenn Kotche | A Ghost Is Born | 4:26 |
| 10. | "Jesus, Etc." | Tweedy, Bennett | Yankee Hotel Foxtrot | 4:00 |
| 11. | "I'm the Man Who Loves You" | Tweedy, Bennett | Yankee Hotel Foxtrot | 3:58 |
| 12. | "Kicking Television" | | B-side of "I'm a Wheel" single (2004) | 3:03 |
| Total length: | | | | 55:35 |

=== Disc two ===
| No. | Title | Writer(s) | Source | Length |
|---|---|---|---|---|
| 1. | "Via Chicago" | | Summerteeth | 5:14 |
| 2. | "Hummingbird" | | A Ghost Is Born | 3:19 |
| 3. | "Muzzle of Bees" | | A Ghost Is Born | 4:49 |
| 4. | "One by One" | Woody Guthrie, Tweedy | Mermaid Avenue (1998) | 3:26 |
| 5. | "Airline to Heaven" | Guthrie, Bennett, Tweedy | Mermaid Avenue Vol. II (2000) | 4:41 |
| 6. | "Radio Cure" | Tweedy, Bennett | Yankee Hotel Foxtrot | 4:42 |
| 7. | "Ashes of American Flags" | Tweedy, Bennett | Yankee Hotel Foxtrot | 6:03 |
| 8. | "Heavy Metal Drummer" | | Yankee Hotel Foxtrot | 3:21 |
| 9. | "Poor Places" | Tweedy, Bennett | Yankee Hotel Foxtrot | 5:31 |
| 10. | "Spiders (Kidsmoke)" | | A Ghost Is Born | 11:17 |
| 11. | "Comment" | Yusef Rahman, Charles Wright | previously unreleased | 6:13 |
| 12. | "Monday" (iTunes bonus track) | | Being There | 4:11 |
| Total length: | | | | 62:53 |

=== Vinyl bonus tracks ===
1. "Another Man's Done Gone" (Guthrie, Bragg) (from Mermaid Avenue)
2. "How to Fight Loneliness" (Tweedy, Bennett) (from Summerteeth)
3. "Theologians" (Tweedy, Jorgensen, Chris Girard) (from A Ghost Is Born)
4. "Kamera" (Tweedy, Bennett) (from Yankee Hotel Foxtrot)
5. "Just a Kid" (Jeff Tweedy, Spencer Tweedy) (from The SpongeBob SquarePants Movie – Music from the Movie and More...)
6. "Monday" (from Being There)
7. "Outtasite (Outta Mind)" (from Being There)
8. "I'm a Wheel" (from A Ghost Is Born)

"How to Fight Loneliness" (from Summerteeth) and "Monday" (from Being There) were included with purchase of the album on iTunes.

== Personnel ==
All information is taken from the liner notes of Kicking Television.

- Jeff Tweedy – vocals, guitar
- John Stirratt – bass guitar, backing vocals
- Glenn Kotche – drums, percussion
- Nels Cline – guitar, lap steel guitar
- Pat Sansone – guitar, keyboards, backing vocals
- Mikael Jorgensen – keyboards
- Patrick Newbery – trumpet, flugelhorn
- Nick Broste – trombone
- Rick Parenti – baritone sax
- Karina Benznicki – production supervisor
- Eli Cane – production coordination
- Mycle Konopka, Timothy Powell – engineers
- Nick Webb – mastering
- Stan Doty, Jim Scott – mixing
- Dan Glomski, Michael Ways – assistants
- Chris Hoffman, Deborah Miles Johnson, Frankie Montuoro, Matt Zivich – technical crew
- Nathan Baker – photography, technical crew
- Zoran Orlic, Mike Segal – photography
