= Wilco (The Album) =

Studio album by Wilco
- Released: June 30, 2009
- Recorded: January 2009
- Studios: Roundhead studios in Auckland, New Zealand and The Wilco Loft, Irving Park, Chicago, Illinois
- Genres: Alt-country; indie rock
- Length: 42:52
- Label: Nonesuch
- Producers: Wilco, Jim Scott

Wilco chronology
Sky Blue Sky (2007)	Wilco (The Album) (2009)	The Whole Love (2011)

Wilco (The Album) is the seventh studio album by the American rock band Wilco, released on June 30, 2009, by Nonesuch Records. Prior to release, Wilco streamed the album on their website. The album was nominated for a Grammy Award for Best Americana Album.

== Production ==
After Wilco released their sixth studio album, Sky Blue Sky, in 2007, they spent the following two years touring to promote the album. In August 2008, Billboard reported that Wilco had been playing two new songs, "One Wing" and "Sonny Feeling", at recent shows in anticipation of a new studio album. Rolling Stone revealed the title of the album on April 28, 2009.

The album was recorded in Neil Finn's recording studio Roundhead Studios in Auckland, New Zealand. Members of Wilco were present to record material for a 7 Worlds Collide compilation album to benefit Oxfam. Guitarist Nels Cline and multi-instrumentalist Mikael Jorgensen provided overdubs once the band returned to Chicago. The album was produced by the band and Jim Scott, who worked as an engineer on Being There, Summerteeth, and Sky Blue Sky. The band joined Scott in Valencia, California to mix the album. According to lead singer Jeff Tweedy, the band "allow[ed] [themselves] a little bit more leeway in terms of sculpting the sound in the studio and doing overdubs and using the studio as another instrument".

Wilco (The Album) included the first duet to be featured on a Wilco album, "You and I", which was recorded with Canadian indie folk singer Feist. The band met Feist at the 50th Grammy Awards and found they had a mutual appreciation for each other's music.

On May 13, 2009, the album leaked on the internet, and Wilco promptly responded by streaming the album for free on their website. The stream resulted in over 100,000 visits to Wilco's website on the 13th. The band also suggested that those who downloaded the leaked copy make a charitable donation to Inspiration Corporation, an organization that assists low-income families in Chicago. Blogger Mike Masnick praised Wilco for their response to the leak, contrasting it to the reactionary response from 20th Century Fox following the leak of X-Men Origins: Wolverine.

=== Sound ===
The album has been invariably described as the band's most accessible and upbeat since their early albums, with The Independent stating that it "recall[s] the simplicity of the band's early LPs A.M. and Being There." Matthew Perpetua of Pitchfork concurs, arguing that on the album "the disparate strains within the group's catalog have somehow flowed together into a unifying aesthetic", with the album touching on all of Wilco's various styles and guises in the past, which Perpetua identifies as "alt-country, Americana, neo-folk, quasi-experimental, and, if you insist, "dad rock."" Critic Jonathan Cohen also noted "Deeper Down" for its "wealth of sonic details".

The album's sixth track "You Never Know" features influences from the works of George Harrison. David Fricke of Rolling Stone noted the song's "Seventies-George Harrison sunshine." NPR's Ken Tucker mentioned "the George Harrison-ish melody of its refrain." Kevin McKeough of Chicago pointed out the "quoting a George Harrison guitar lick" in the song.

=== Themes ===
Tweedy summarized the main theme of the album as the acceptance of life's uncertainties, stating

I think there's a liberating nature to that concept [...] It allows for a playfulness and an engagement in life that is more enjoyable than the alternative. I've aspired to convey some of those things for a long time now, maybe not so clearly before because it hasn't been so clear to me. But I do believe that the greater ability you have to tolerate ambiguity, the more successfully you can steer your life. The alternative point of view—the complete dismissal of ambiguity, trying to rationalise irrationality—can be very destructive.

This theme is manifested, for example, in the line from "Deeper Down" which goes "I adore the meaninglessness of the 'this' we can't express."

The album's lyrics portray both dark and light subject matter, from "Bull Black Nova", which is written from the point of view of a man who just killed his girlfriend, to the Feist duet "You and I", which treats two lovers trying to keep a relationship together.

=== Title ===
The album was named after the band because it "[felt] like what the band was meant to be". According to Tweedy the band "struggled with a lot of other titles that felt more exemplary of what the music was. But nothing else felt quite so succinct."

== Promotion ==
Wilco appeared on The Colbert Report to play "Wilco (the song)" and promote 2008 presidential candidate Barack Obama. Wilco embarked on a 21-show tour to promote the album starting on June 12, 2009. The tour concluded with a performance at the 10,000 Lakes Festival in Detroit Lakes, Minnesota.

The song "You Never Know" was released as the first single. They performed the song on The Tonight Show with Conan O'Brien on June 24, 2009. The song reached the #1 spot on the Billboard Triple A Chart

The song "You and I" was performed on the Late Show with David Letterman on July 14, 2009.

== Reception ==
Professional ratings
Aggregate scores
Source	Rating
AnyDecentMusic?	7.7/10
Metacritic	76/100
Review scores
Source	Rating
AllMusic	4/5 stars
The A.V. Club	B
The Daily Telegraph	4/5 stars
Entertainment Weekly	B
The Guardian	3/5 stars
MSN Music (Consumer Guide)	A−
NME	8/10
Pitchfork	7.3/10
Rolling Stone	4/5 stars
Spin	8/10

Wilco (The Album) received generally favorable reviews, garnering a 76/100 critic score on Metacritic from 34 critics. NME gave the album a score of eight out of ten and noted that Wilco "covered all bases this time; pushing themselves to experiment while still celebrating what makes their music so catchy and compelling," while Paste gave the album a score of 7.4 out of ten and described it as "full of thoughtful, artfully crafted lyrics wrapped in memorable hooks that should stand the test of time." Other reviewers made note of the creative longevity of the band, with Pitchfork citing it as the "work of veterans unafraid to express mature emotions with an appropriate level of musical depth and nuance" and The Record Review remarking that "in their fifteenth year, Wilco is still crafting albums that are both melodic and relevant."

Filter gave the album a score of 87% and said it "adds yet another chapter to the story, and if this band's relevance is to continue going forward, then let the resilent closer 'Everlasting Everything' score our impending sunrise." Uncut gave the album four stars out of five and labeled it as the "Album of the Month" while stating that it "picks up more or less where 2007's mellow and soulful 'Sky Blue Sky' left off, but subtly expands that record's parameters." Q also gave the album four stars out of five and said that everything in the album "delivers the predominant warmth 'Sky Blue Sky' lacked and betrays a sharp ear for melody that has often been obscured by sonic theatrics." Alternative Press likewise gave the album four stars out of five and said, "Wilco continues to reign in their experimental fuzz, focusing more on pretty melodies, upbeat toe-tappers and sweet acoustic numbers for their seventh full-length." Now likewise gave the album four stars and called the album "middle-of-the-road, but only by Wilco standards. A worthwhile listen." Hot Press gave the album a favorable review and said the album has "Surprisingly laidback new dispatch from uptight country rockers." The Boston Globe also gave the album a favorable review and stated: "Like with many good rock records, bits of whimsy, melancholy, confusion, and joy swirl around the songs of Wilco (the album). So while it may not feel as groundbreaking as previous releases, it's just as human."

The Phoenix gave the album three stars out of four and said it "finds the band looser and more assertive than they were on their two previous efforts." Billboard gave the album a rating of 72 out of 100 and stated: "The band's current six-member lineup, together five years and responsible for 2007's stunning "Sky Blue Sky," is its strongest to date—and Wilco (The Album) is as well-rounded an effort as the group has released." The Austin Chronicle gave the album three-and-a-half stars out of five and stated: "What it lacks in identity, perhaps a statement of purpose locked down by a title, the tightly produced, musically pointed Wilco compensates for in near-total coalescence. Its hope, vulnerability, and fears converse as one Tweedy." Under the Radar gave the album seven stars out of ten and said it "rumbles out of the gate with a scruffy exuberance reminiscent of the early tracks of 'Summerteeth,' before finding its way back to the high-end country art rock the band has specialized in since we first found out Tweedy gets bad headaches."

Other reviews are average or mixed: Yahoo! Music UK gave the album a score of six stars out of ten and said of Wilco: "Like a slightly under-serving best of, though, we get glimpses of what they've done before, but nothing substantial enough to set a new high-water mark." No Ripcord also gave the album a score of six stars out of ten and said that it "doesn't sound like a band that's pushing itself any more, or at least not making the same sort of pushes that lead to the brilliant sucker-punch of Yankee Hotel Foxtrot and the vastly underrated A Ghost Is Born." The Guardian gave the album three stars out of five and said the album was "well written, nicely produced and tastefully retro, with a few vaguely experimental bits." Slant Magazine also awarded the album three stars out of five and said, "It doesn't help that Wilco is such a complacent album, so easily redolent of sounds and textures the band has called up in the past." Tiny Mix Tapes gave the album two-and-a-half stars out of five and said it "isn't a failure--not by any means--but when a band has become so attached to the notion of change and then stagnates, it casts a heavy shadow that's hard to escape." Dusted Magazine gave the album a negative review and said, "Wilco is a Great Band, if you like stuff that's boring. And a lot of people seemingly do."

== Track listing ==
All songs written by Jeff Tweedy, except for "Deeper Down" co-written by Tweedy and Pat Sansone.

No.	Title	Length
1.	"Wilco (The Song)"	2:59
2.	"Deeper Down"	2:59
3.	"One Wing"	3:42
4.	"Bull Black Nova"	5:40
5.	"You and I"	3:26
6.	"You Never Know"	4:21
7.	"Country Disappeared"	4:02
8.	"Solitaire"	3:04
9.	"I'll Fight"	4:23
10.	"Sonny Feeling"	4:13
11.	"Everlasting Everything"	3:59
Total length:		42:47

=== iTunes bonus track ===
No.	Title	Length
12.	"Dark Neon"	4:24

== Personnel ==
Wilco

- Nels Cline – electric guitar, lap steel, electric "shorty" 12-string, loops, electric 12-string guitar, slide guitar
- Mikael Jorgensen – piano, bowed piano, synthesizer, Hammond organ, background vocals
- Glenn Kotche – drums, percussion, chimes, cimbalom, gunpowder
- Pat Sansone – Wurlitzer electric piano, harpsichord, Fender Rhodes, Mellotron, dulcimer, celeste, acoustic guitar, electric guitar, banjo, piano, field organ, Hammond organ, tambourine, pump organ, Optigan organ, background vocals
- John Stirratt – bass guitar, electric guitar, background vocals
- Jeff Tweedy – vocals, electric guitar, acoustic guitar, 12-string acoustic guitar, 12-string electric guitar

Additional musicians

- Dave Max Crawford – trumpet on "Everlasting Everything"
- Leslie Feist – vocals on "You and I"
- Neil Finn – background vocals on "Wilco (The Song)", "One Wing", "You Never Know", "Sonny Feeling", "Everlasting Everything"
- Jason Tobias – slide cimbalom on "Deeper Down"

== Charts ==
=== Weekly charts ===
Chart (2009)	Peak position
Australian Albums (ARIA)	47
Austrian Albums (Ö3 Austria)	60
Belgian Albums (Ultratop Flanders)	25
Canadian Albums (Billboard)	10
Dutch Albums (Album Top 100)	50
Finnish Albums (Suomen virallinen lista)	38
French Albums (SNEP)	133
German Albums (Offizielle Top 100)	32
Irish Albums (IRMA)	27
Italian Albums (FIMI)	41
Japanese Albums (Oricon)	95
New Zealand Albums (RMNZ)	17
Norwegian Albums (VG-lista)	12
Scottish Albums (Official Charts)	47
Spanish Albums (Promusicae)	16
Swedish Albums (Sverigetopplistan)	31
Swiss Albums (Schweizer Hitparade)	43
UK Albums (Official Charts)	49
US Billboard 200	4
US Top Alternative Albums (Billboard)	1
US Top Rock Albums (Billboard)	2

=== Year-end charts ===
Chart (2009)	Position
US Billboard 200	140
US Top Rock Albums (Billboard)	36
