= Ode to Joy (Wilco album) =

Studio album by Wilco
- Released: October 4, 2019
- Recorded: January 2019
- Studios: The Loft, Chicago, Illinois, U.S.
- Genre: Folk rock
- Length: 42:27
- Label: dBpm
- Producers: Jeff Tweedy; Tom Schick

Wilco chronology
Schmilco (2016)	Ode to Joy (2019)	Cruel Country (2022)

Singles from Ode to Joy
- 1. "Love Is Everywhere (Beware)" Released: July 16, 2019; 2. "Everyone Hides" Released: September 17, 2019

Ode to Joy is the eleventh studio album by the American rock band Wilco, released on October 4, 2019, by dBpm Records. The release has received positive reviews.

== Recording and release ==
Wilco recorded the album in their Chicago studios in early 2019; on July 16, they announced the album, released lead single "Love Is Everywhere (Beware)", and announced tour dates. The live performances break a two and a half year hiatus for the band from touring and a year off in general. "Everyone Hides" was released as the album's second single on September 17, 2019. "Everyone Hides" was previously recorded by Jeff Tweedy's side project Tweedy for the 2014 film St. Vincent, starring Bill Murray and Melissa McCarthy. The album was recorded by taking simple song sketches from singer Jeff Tweedy, recording them in the studio with drummer Glenn Kotche, and then introducing the rest of the band to flesh out the musical ideas.

== Critical reception ==
Professional ratings
Aggregate scores
Source	Rating
AnyDecentMusic?	7.8/10
Metacritic	81/100
Review scores
Source	Rating
AllMusic	4/5 stars
Exclaim!	8/10
The Guardian	4/5 stars
The Line of Best Fit	8.5/10
Mojo	4/5 stars
Pitchfork	7.8/10
Q	4/5 stars
Rolling Stone	4/5 stars
Slant Magazine	3.5/5 stars
Uncut	9/10

According to the review aggregator Metacritic, Ode to Joy received "universal acclaim" based on a weighted average score of 81 out of 100 from 25 critic scores. Erin Osmon of Uncut praised the album, writing, "It's a protest record only this sextet could make, one that rings loudest in its simplicity. It favours subtle textures and hushed vocals, and further reveals its wisdom with each listen." Prior to its release, Paste named this one of the albums the writers were most excited about for October, citing the band's diversity and calling this release, "larger-than-life soft rock full of both grand ideas about the state of our world and small musings about matters of the heart". Reviewing the album for AllMusic Mark Deming claimed the band were, "more than willing to explore the boundaries of their music, and they do so with the confidence and sense of daring that has marked their best work from Being There onward." Michael Hann of The Guardian gave the release four out of five stars, praising the lyrics expressiveness and the different—if not quite experimental—use of varied instrumentation. Nile Amos of Vinyl Chapters stated, "the album urges us, in the present world, to hunker down and appreciate loved ones and each other, more now than ever." Writing for PopMatters, Justin Cober-Lake rated this release a 6 out of 10, stating that the "record doesn't entirely succeed" but "while the sound remains mostly subdued, Wilco sound more invigorated than they did on their last album, with studio precision helping to make these songs into something more memorable".

== Track listing ==
All tracks written by Jeff Tweedy.

1. "Bright Leaves" – 4:10
2. "Before Us" – 3:22
3. "One and a Half Stars" – 3:44
4. "Quiet Amplifier" – 5:50
5. "Everyone Hides" – 3:00
6. "White Wooden Cross" – 3:12
7. "Citizens" – 3:03
8. "We Were Lucky" – 4:56
9. "Love Is Everywhere (Beware)" – 3:34
10. "Hold Me Anyway" – 4:00
11. "An Empty Corner" – 3:46

== Personnel ==
Credits adapted from liner notes.

Wilco

- Nels Cline – guitar
- Mikael Jorgensen – keyboards
- Glenn Kotche – drums, percussion
- Pat Sansone – guitar, backing vocals
- John Stirratt – bass guitar
- Jeff Tweedy – vocals, guitar, production, package design

Additional personnel

- Lawrence Azerrad – packaging design
- Mark Greenberg – engineering assistance
- Bob Ludwig – mastering
- Zoran Orlic – photography
- Tom Schick – engineering, mixing, production
- Paul Von Mertens – saxophone

== Charts ==
=== Weekly charts ===
Weekly sales chart performance for Ode to Joy
Chart (2019)	Peak position
Australian Albums (ARIA)	23
Austrian Albums (Ö3 Austria)	42
Belgian Albums (Ultratop Flanders)	20
Belgian Albums (Ultratop Wallonia)	149
Canadian Albums (Billboard)	77
Dutch Albums (Album Top 100)	24
French Albums (SNEP)	193
German Albums (Offizielle Top 100)	25
Irish Albums (IRMA)	28
Scottish Albums (Official Charts)	8
Spanish Albums (Promusicae)	13
Swiss Albums (Schweizer Hitparade)	24
UK Albums (Official Charts)	29
US Billboard 200	21
US Americana/Folk Albums (Billboard)	1
US Independent Albums (Billboard)	1
US Top Rock Albums (Billboard)	2

=== Year-end charts ===
Annual sales chart performance for Ode to Joy
Chart (2019)	Position
US Independent Albums (Billboard)	38
