= Schmilco =

Studio album by Wilco
- Released: September 9, 2016
- Recorded: Chicago
- Genre: Folk rock
- Length: 36:22
- Label: dBpm
- Producers: Jeff Tweedy; Tom Schick

Wilco chronology
Star Wars (2015)	Schmilco (2016)	Ode to Joy (2019)

Singles from Schmilco
- 1. "Locator" Released: July 14, 2016; 2. "If I Ever Was a Child" Released: July 18, 2016

Schmilco is the tenth studio album by the American rock band Wilco, released on September 9, 2016, by dBpm Records. Wilco announced the album on July 19, 2016, and released two songs, "Locator" and "If I Ever Was a Child". The album's announcement came a little more than a year after their previous studio album, Star Wars.

== Background and release ==
In February 2016, Jeff Tweedy first mentioned in an interview that Wilco would be releasing an album in 2016, though did not go into detail. During his solo benefit shows in Chicago later in May, Tweedy said they had finished the new record, but the band wasn't sure they wanted to release it yet. In July 2016, Wilco released "Locator" from the album to commemorate the one-year anniversary of Star Wars and then announced Schmilco several days later, in addition to releasing "If I Ever Was a Child" and "Someone to Lose". In September several days before the release, Wilco had "I Heard Schmilco" events at record stores to promote the album across the country where people could listen to the album and then buy it on vinyl.

The album's name is a nod to the Harry Nilsson album Nilsson Schmilsson. The artwork was created by illustrator Joan Cornellà in collaboration with Stefania Lusini.

On the album, Tweedy tells stories of himself, his family, and his history.

== Critical reception ==
Professional ratings
Aggregate scores
Source	Rating
AnyDecentMusic?	7.4/10
Metacritic	79/100
Review scores
Source	Rating
AllMusic	3.5/5 stars
The A.V. Club	A−
Chicago Tribune	3/4 stars
The Guardian	4/5 stars
The Independent	4/5 stars
Mojo	4/5 stars
Pitchfork	7.0/10
Q	4/5 stars
Rolling Stone	3.5/5 stars
Uncut	9/10

According to the review aggregator Metacritic, Schmilco received "generally favorable reviews" based on a weighted average score of 79 out of 100 from 26 critic scores.

=== Accolades ===
Accolades for Schmilco
Publication	Accolade	Year	Rank
Consequence of Sound	Top 50 Albums of 2016	2016	16
Mojo	The 50 Best Albums of 2016	2016	36
Paste	The 50 Best Albums of 2016	2016	26
Rolling Stone	50 Best Albums of 2016	2016	41

== Track listing ==
All tracks are written by Jeff Tweedy.

Schmilco track listing
No.	Title	Length
1.	"Normal American Kids"	2:47
2.	"If I Ever Was a Child"	2:55
3.	"Cry All Day"	4:16
4.	"Common Sense"	3:24
5.	"Nope"	3:02
6.	"Someone to Lose"	3:20
7.	"Happiness"	3:00
8.	"Quarters"	2:50
9.	"Locator"	2:18
10.	"Shrug and Destroy"	2:52
11.	"We Aren't the World (Safety Girl)"	2:53
12.	"Just Say Goodbye"	2:45
Total length:		36:22

== Personnel ==
Wilco

- Nels Cline – guitar
- Mikael Jorgensen – keyboard
- Glenn Kotche – drums
- Pat Sansone – guitar, keyboard
- John Stirratt – bass guitar
- Jeff Tweedy – lead vocals, guitar, production

Additional personnel

- Joan Cornellà – cover art
- Mark Greenberg – engineering
- Bob Ludwig – mastering
- Tom Schick – production
- Spencer Tweedy – drums

== Charts ==
=== Weekly charts ===
Weekly sales chart performance for Schmilco
Chart (2016)	Peak position
Australian Albums (ARIA)	16
Austrian Albums (Ö3 Austria)	25
Belgian Albums (Ultratop Flanders)	10
Belgian Albums (Ultratop Wallonia)	50
Dutch Albums (Album Top 100)	9
French Albums (SNEP)	90
German Albums (Offizielle Top 100)	21
Irish Albums (IRMA)	18
Italian Albums (FIMI)	46
New Zealand Albums (RMNZ)	14
Norwegian Albums (VG-lista)	16
Scottish Albums (Official Charts)	17
Spanish Albums (Promusicae)	14
Swedish Albums (Sverigetopplistan)	46
Swiss Albums (Schweizer Hitparade)	22
UK Albums (Official Charts)	25
US Billboard 200	11
US Top Rock Albums (Billboard)	5

=== Year-end charts ===
Annual sales chart performance for Schmilco
Chart (2016)	Position
Belgian Albums (Ultratop Flanders)	200
US Top Rock Albums (Billboard)	71
