= Together at Last =

Studio album by Jeff Tweedy
- Released: June 23, 2017
- Recorded: January 2016
- Studio: The Loft (Chicago, IL)
- Length: 38:25
- Label: dBpm
- Producer: Jeff Tweedy; Tom Schick

Jeff Tweedy chronology
Sukierae (2014)	Together at Last (2017)	Warm (2018)

Together at Last is the first solo album by American singer-singwriter Jeff Tweedy. It was released on June 23, 2017 via dBpm Records. Recording sessions took place at the Loft in Chicago in January 2016. Produced by Tweedy himself together with Tom Schick, the album marks the first release of a proposed retrospective series titled Loft Acoustic Sessions that will see Tweedy revisit songs from Wilco's catalog, as well as from his Golden Smog and Loose Fur side projects.

== Critical reception ==
Professional ratings
Aggregate scores
Source	Rating
Metacritic	74/100
Review scores
Source	Rating
AllMusic	3.5/5 stars
American Songwriter	3.5/5 stars
Paste	7.8/10
Pitchfork	6.6/10
Record Collector	4/5 stars
Slant	3/5 stars
The A.V. Club	A−
The Guardian	3/5 stars
The Independent	3/5 stars
Under the Radar	7/10 stars

Together at Last was met with universal acclaim from music critics. At Metacritic, which assigns a normalized rating out of 100 to reviews from mainstream publications, the album received an average score of 74 based on eighteen reviews.

Josh Modell of The A.V. Club praised the album, stating: "another side-project song, Golden Smog's "Lost Love", gets sweetly chilled, and the Summerteeth deep cut "In A Future Age" loses some of its flair from the album version but gains intimacy. That's true of this whole exercise, really, but the trade-off works fantastically well on those particular songs". Jamie Atkins of Record Collector described it as "a thoughtfully compiled career-spanning collection, performed solo on acoustic guitar". AllMusic's Mark Deming concluded: "if Together at Last is a minor work in Tweedy's catalog, it's a simple but genuine pleasure that may convert a few doubters who haven't been won over by Wilco's eclecticism". Jim Beviglia of American Songwriter mentioned: "song choice is everything with a project like this, and Tweedy is wise to generally stray from obvious selections". Aug Stone of Under the Radar noted: "here the minimal setting makes not just the lyrics more prominent but the melody as well". Philip Cosores of Pitchfork stated: "with his wry charm absent, the album ultimately shows only a partial picture of Jeff Tweedy as a solo artist".

In mixed reviews, Josh Hurst of Slant saw the album "won't ever take a place among the landmarks in Tweedy's catalogue, but it does provide a fresh way to hear and appreciate them". Dave Simpson of The Guardian stated: "the unplugged format can get samey, but his delicate guitar playing is a joy and "Via Chicago"'s presumably metaphorical opening line, "I dreamed about killing you again last night", never sounded more lovely". Andy Gill of The Independent wrote: "for Together At Last, Jeff Tweedy revisits choice items from his back catalogue in solo unplugged mode. It's a brave step, given the imaginative depth with which Wilco animates this material, but it does allow the songs' core characters to come through more strongly". Matt Bobkin of Exclaim! stated: "for Tweedy diehards, these intimate reworks may come off as a nice fireside chat with an old friend, but those less familiar with the singer are better off starting with the originals".

== Track listing ==
No.	Title	Writer(s)	Length
1.	"Via Chicago"	Jeff Tweedy	5:07
2.	"Laminated Cat"	Tweedy; Jim O'Rourke; Glenn Kotche	3:49
3.	"Lost Love"	Tweedy	2:28
4.	"Muzzle of Bees"	Tweedy; O'Rourke	3:49
5.	"Ashes of American Flags"	Tweedy; Jay Bennett	3:45
6.	"Dawned on Me"	Tweedy; Pat Sansone	2:52
7.	"In a Future Age"	Tweedy; Bennett	2:52
8.	"I Am Trying to Break Your Heart"	Tweedy; Bennett	3:40
9.	"Hummingbird"	Tweedy	3:17
10.	"I'm Always in Love"	Tweedy; Bennett	3:31
11.	"Sky Blue Sky"	Tweedy	3:15
Total length:			38:25

== Personnel ==
- Jeff Tweedy – vocals, guitar, harmonica, producer
- Tom Schick – producer, engineering, mixing
- Bob Ludwig – mastering
- Viki Gonia – cover photo
- Lawrence Azerrad – design

== Charts ==
Chart (2017)	Peak position
Belgian Albums (Ultratop Flanders)	103
Belgian Albums (Ultratop Wallonia)	178
Dutch Albums (Album Top 100)	101
Scottish Albums (OCC)	51
UK Americana Albums (OCC)	6
UK Independent Albums (OCC)	18
US Billboard 200	49
US Top Alternative Albums (Billboard)	7
US Top Rock Albums (Billboard)	9
US Independent Albums (Billboard)	4
