= Star Wars (Wilco album) =

Studio album by Wilco
- Released: July 16, 2015
- Genres: Art rock; indie rock
- Length: 33:47
- Label: dBpm
- Producers: Tom Schick; Jeff Tweedy

Wilco chronology
Alpha Mike Foxtrot: Rare Tracks 1994–2014 (2014)	Star Wars (2015)	Schmilco (2016)

Professional ratings
Aggregate scores
Source	Rating
AnyDecentMusic?	7.8/10
Metacritic	83/100
Review scores
Source	Rating
AllMusic	4/5 stars
The A.V. Club	B+
Chicago Tribune	3.5/4 stars
Entertainment Weekly	A−
The Guardian	4/5 stars
The Independent	5/5 stars
Mojo	4/5 stars
Pitchfork	7.7/10
Rolling Stone	4.5/5 stars
Spin	7/10

Star Wars is the ninth studio album by the American rock band Wilco. It was self-released for free on July 16, 2015, through wilcoworld.net. It is the second Wilco album that was released on their own label dBpm. A CD version of the album was released on August 21 and a vinyl version was released on October 13. The album emerged from Wilco recording sessions at The Loft that also resulted in their 2016 album Schmilco.

== Cover art ==
In an interview with Rolling Stone, Wilco lead singer Jeff Tweedy explained the cover art and album title.

It's kind of an extension of the thought process behind, I don't know, staying in touch with some sort of wild energy as much as possible and some sort of an irreverence. But that painting of that cat hangs in the kitchen at the [Wilco] loft, and every day I'd look at it and go, "You know, that should just be the album cover." Then I started thinking about the phrase "Star Wars" recontextualized against that painting—it was beautiful and jarring. The album has nothing to do with Star Wars. It just makes me feel good. It makes me feel limitless and like there's still possibilities and still surprise in the world, you know?

In a November 2018 interview on The Late Show with Stephen Colbert Jeff Tweedy stated that they were prepared to rename and redistribute the album as 'Cease and Desist' as they assumed they would be sued by George Lucas (though he no longer owned the franchise by that time). They allegedly also prepared album artwork featuring McDonald's Golden Arches upside-down as the W in Wilco.

== Accolades ==
Publication	Accolade	Year	Rank
The A.V. Club	The 15 Best Albums of 2015	2015	14
Flood Magazine	FLOOD's Best of 2015	2015	6

== Commercial performance ==
The album debuted at No. 105 on Billboard 200, and No. 18 on Top Rock Albums for charts dated September 12, 2015, selling 6,000 copies in the first week. The album has sold 21,000 copies in the United States as of August 2016.

== Track listing ==
All songs written by Jeff Tweedy, except for "You Satellite" co-written by Tweedy, Glenn Kotche and Nels Cline, "Taste the Ceiling" by Tweedy and Scott McCaughey, and "Magnetized" by Tweedy and Mikael Jorgensen.

No.	Title	Length
1.	"EKG"	1:15
2.	"More..."	2:44
3.	"Random Name Generator"	3:50
4.	"The Joke Explained"	2:33
5.	"You Satellite"	5:16
6.	"Taste the Ceiling"	3:15
7.	"Pickled Ginger"	2:30
8.	"Where Do I Begin"	2:54
9.	"Cold Slope"	3:10
10.	"King of You"	2:40
11.	"Magnetized"	3:40
Total length:		33:47

== Personnel ==
Wilco

- Jeff Tweedy – acoustic guitar, electric guitar, vocals
- John Stirratt – bass, acoustic guitar, vocals
- Glenn Kotche – drums, percussion
- Mikael Jorgensen – keyboards
- Nels Cline – electric guitar, loops
- Patrick Sansone – electric guitar, keyboards, vocals

Additional musicians

- Spencer Tweedy – additional percussion
- Scott McCaughey – Mellotron and piano on "Taste the Ceiling"

== Charts ==
Chart (2015)	Peak position
Australian Albums (ARIA)	60
Belgian Albums (Ultratop Flanders)	46
Belgian Albums (Ultratop Wallonia)	80
Dutch Albums (Album Top 100)	14
German Albums (Offizielle Top 100)	83
Irish Albums (IRMA)	69
New Zealand Albums (RMNZ)	30
Spanish Albums (Promusicae)	65
Swiss Albums (Schweizer Hitparade)	52
UK Albums (Official Charts)	83
US Billboard 200	105
US Independent Albums (Billboard)	8
US Top Alternative Albums (Billboard)	10
US Top Rock Albums (Billboard)	18
