= A Ghost Is Born =

Studio album by Wilco
- Released: June 22, 2004
- Recorded: November 19, 2003 – February 20, 2004
- Studios: Sear Sound (New York City), Soma EMS (Chicago)
- Genres: Art rock; indie rock
- Length: 67:26
- Label: Nonesuch
- Producers: Wilco, Jim O'Rourke

Wilco chronology
Yankee Hotel Foxtrot (2002)	A Ghost Is Born (2004)	Sky Blue Sky (2007)

Singles from A Ghost Is Born
- 1. "I'm a Wheel" Released: July 26, 2004

A Ghost Is Born is the fifth studio album by the American rock band Wilco, released on June 22, 2004, by Nonesuch Records. It features singer Jeff Tweedy on lead guitar more than any previous Wilco album. The band streamed the album online free, and offered a five-song EP to purchasers.

Tweedy entered a rehab clinic shortly before the release of the album, delaying its release by two weeks. It also shortened its promotional tour. Despite this, A Ghost Is Born's opening week was the best sales week for the band at the time, and the album was met with positive reviews from major publications such as Rolling Stone and PopMatters. The album earned Wilco a Grammy Award for Best Alternative Music Album.

== Production ==
Wilco signed a contract with Nonesuch Records in November 2001 after a lengthy dispute with Reprise Records over the release of the band's fourth album Yankee Hotel Foxtrot. Foxtrot was welcomed with positive reviews from The Village Voice—where the album was rated by the critics as the best album of 2002—and Rolling Stone. It sold over 590,000 copies, earning a Gold certification by the Recording Industry Association of America.

=== Composition ===
Recording for a new album began on November 19, 2003, under the working title W*lco Happens. The album was produced by Jim O'Rourke, who mixed Foxtrot and was a member of Wilco side project Loose Fur. O'Rourke encouraged lead singer Jeff Tweedy to develop his guitar skills for the album; Tweedy recently became the lead guitarist for the band due to the dismissal of Jay Bennett after the Yankee Hotel Foxtrot recording sessions. Tweedy sought to play solos on the album that were not improvised and instead, he performed composed solos influenced by Television such as the one during the coda of "At Least That's What You Said". Tweedy refers to the guitar solo at the end of the track as a "musical transcription" of one of his panic attacks. A Ghost Is Born was recorded in a manner different from Foxtrot or 1999's Summerteeth; whereas those recordings were performed live in the studio and then extensively de-constructed and arranged in Pro Tools, A Ghost Is Born was first performed live, edited and arranged in Pro Tools, and then performed and re-recorded with minimal overdubbing. Tweedy was excited about writing an album this way:

All those things you can do with Pro Tools and all the emotional buttons you can push with just purely sonic things I think can be done with just plain old music. I love all the possibilities that modern recording techniques allow, but I couldn't picture the idea of really wowing anyone with some crazy evolution of the Yankee Hotel Foxtrot sound.

An unusual feature of A Ghost Is Born is the fifteen-minute long track "Less Than You Think". The first part of the song begins as a ballad which references belief systems and atheism which after 3 minutes, fades out. The second part consists of electronic drones and noise, intended to audibly represent the migraines that lead singer Jeff Tweedy had been suffering from while addicted to pain killers during the recording sessions for A Ghost Is Born. For the song, each band member created a synthesizer noise that mimicked an electronic sound. The installations were simultaneously activated in the room and recorded. The noise, which served as the coda to the song, was remixed to provide dynamics to the track. Calling it "the track that everyone will hate," Tweedy defended the song's inclusion on the album:

I know ninety-nine percent of our fans won't like that song, they'll say it's a ridiculous indulgence. Even I don't want to listen to it every time I play through the album. But the times I do calm myself down and pay attention to it, I think it's valuable and moving and cathartic. I wouldn't have put it on the record if I didn't think it was great … I wanted to make an album about identity, and within that is the idea of a higher power, the idea of randomness, and that anything can happen, and that we can't control it.

A Ghost Is Born was the first Wilco album with pianist Mikael Jorgensen; he had previously worked as an engineer with the band on their collaboration with The Minus 5. Jeff Tweedy provided lead vocals and acted as lead guitarist for the only time since the band formed. John Stirratt, the only original member aside from Tweedy, played bass and guitar. Glenn Kotche and Jim O'Rourke, Tweedy's associates from Loose Fur, acted as drummer and multi-instrumentalist, respectively. Leroy Bach played a variety of keyboards as well as additional guitar and bass guitar. All members of the band contributed with a synthesizer part on "Less Than You Think".

== Marketing and promotion ==
Wilco began touring in support of Ghost even before the album had been released. Multi-instrumentalist Leroy Bach left the band after the recording sessions to join a theater production, so Wilco added jazz rock guitarist Nels Cline and multi-instrumentalist Pat Sansone to replace him. Sansone had been playing with The Autumn Defense, a side project led by bassist John Stirratt. However, the tour to support the album had to be abridged. In May 2004, Tweedy checked himself into a rehabilitation clinic in Chicago, Illinois due to chronic migraine headaches, anxiety attacks, and clinical depression. In the process of treating the ailments, Tweedy became addicted to prescription painkillers. His rehab led to the cancellation of the European stage of the tour and a delay in the album's release date. Intended for release on June 8, 2004, the album was officially released on June 22, 2004.

The band also webcast the album in its entirety on the Internet in a promotion with Apple Computer. Nonesuch was willing to allow the MPEG-4 broadcast due to the success of a similar broadcast in the promotion of Yankee Hotel Foxtrot. Additionally, Wilco offered a free EP to purchasers of the album. The EP featured two outtakes from the album—"Panthers" and "Kicking Television"—and live versions of "At Least That's What You Said", "The Late Greats", and "Handshake Drugs". The EP was later packaged with the album and sold as a "deluxe version".

== Reception ==
Professional ratings
Aggregate scores
Source	Rating
Metacritic	81/100
Review scores
Source	Rating
AllMusic	4/5 stars
Entertainment Weekly	B
The Guardian	4/5 stars
Los Angeles Times	3.5/4 stars
NME	6/10
Pitchfork	6.6/10 (2004); 9.4/10 (2025)
Q	4/5 stars
Rolling Stone	4/5 stars
Spin	B
The Village Voice	B−

In its debut week, A Ghost Is Born peaked at number 8 on the Billboard 200 chart and sold over 81,000 copies, the highest US chart peak and best sales week ever attained by the band at that time. The album was an international hit as well, peaking at number 24 in Norway, number 29 in Sweden, number 33 in New Zealand, number 34 in Belgium, and number 37 in Ireland. As of April 13, 2007, the album has sold over 340,000 copies in the United States, according to Nielsen SoundScan.

Like Foxtrot, A Ghost Is Born was well received by critics. On Metacritic, the album holds a score of 81 out of 100 from 33 critics, indicating "universal acclaim". Jon Pareles of Rolling Stone called A Ghost Is Born "as eerie as anything Wilco have recorded yet" and applauded Tweedy for offering "illuminating curiosity about what can happen in a song." Billboard cited it as Wilco's "most difficult and uncompromising album to date." Akiva Gottlieb of Stylus Magazine praised A Ghost Is Born as being "even more brilliant" than Yankee Hotel Foxtrot, a sentiment echoed by Michael Metevier of PopMatters, who added that the album made him "surprised and delighted enough to last several lifetimes." Keith Phipps of The A.V. Club wrote that A Ghost Is Born "channels its shaggy sound into pop music" that "constantly threatens to erupt into noise or fade into silence, but it's still hard not to hum along." James Hunter of The Village Voice felt that "Wilco's ideas are unremarkable, but are worked out with intelligence and striking conception. And as it happens, the new organic emphasis tables some of Wilco's lamer stylistic obsessions." Q called the album "more meandering" than Yankee Hotel Foxtrot, but also "more confident, more coherent, yielding an all-enveloping warmth that's entirely resistant to any iPod shuffle function."

Among mixed reviews, Rob Mitchum of Pitchfork criticized A Ghost Is Born as "wildly uneven" and "less cohesive than any other Wilco release." Village Voice critic Robert Christgau called it a "privileged self-indulgence" due to its extreme musical dynamics. NME wrote of the album: "It's like Scissor Sisters on tranquilisers. With a bit of ELO. And a dash of Ramones. And, with this eclecticism, a worrying lack of focus." Joshua Klein of the Chicago Tribune felt that the album possessed an "incomplete" quality which nonetheless can be "quite intriguing, more of a side step than a forward leap, but a worthy experiment all the same." Ann Powers of Blender wrote that on first listen, the album is "rather monotonous, a bunch of moderately singable tunes with some noise piled up around the edges", but that it "starts to insinuate meaning" over subsequent listens.

In 2005, A Ghost Is Born won two Grammy Awards for Best Alternative Music Album and Best Recording Package. Although the band was nominated for Grammys for work on previous albums, this was the first time that they won one. The band only won one award, as the winner for Best Recording Package is credited towards the creator of the artwork, not the performer.

== Track listing ==
All lyrics written by Jeff Tweedy; all songs written by Jeff Tweedy except where noted.

No.	Title	Writer(s)	Length
1.	"At Least That's What You Said"		5:33
2.	"Hell Is Chrome"	Tweedy, Mikael Jorgensen	4:38
3.	"Spiders (Kidsmoke)"		10:46
4.	"Muzzle of Bees"		4:56
5.	"Hummingbird"		3:11
6.	"Handshake Drugs"		6:07
7.	"Wishful Thinking"	Tweedy, Glenn Kotche	4:41
8.	"Company in My Back"		3:46
9.	"I'm a Wheel"		2:37
10.	"Theologians"	Tweedy, Jorgensen, Chris Girard	3:36
11.	"Less Than You Think"	Tweedy, John Stirratt, Kotche, Jorgensen, Leroy Bach, Jim O'Rourke	15:04
12.	"The Late Greats"		2:31
Total length:			67:26

Limited Edition Set CD Two
No.	Title	Length
1.	"Panthers"	3:49
2.	"At Least That's What You Said" (Live)	5:53
3.	"The Late Greats" (Live)	2:39
4.	"Handshake Drugs" (Live)	6:12
5.	"Kicking Television"	2:49
Total length:		21:22

== Personnel ==
=== Wilco ===
- Jeff Tweedy – vocals (all tracks), electric guitar (1–4, 6, 9, 10), acoustic baritone 12-string guitar (4, 7), acoustic guitar (6–8, 10, 12), acoustic 6-string bass, loops, filters, synths (11)
- John Stirratt – bass (1, 3, 6–10, 12), electric guitar (2, 5), backing vocals (2–6), piano (4), acoustic guitar, loops, filters, synths (11)
- Glenn Kotche – drums (all tracks), hammered dulcimer (8, 11), percussion (8), loops, filters, synths (11)
- Leroy Bach – piano (1, 6, 8, 12), Korg CX-3 organ (2, 8), bass (4), vibes (7), electric guitar (9), acoustic guitar (10, 11), loops, filters, synths (11)
- Mikael Jorgensen – synthesizer (1, 8, 11), piano (2–5, 7, 10, 12), Rocksichord (3, 6), Farfisa organ (4, 7, 12), Stylophone (8)

=== Additional musicians ===
- Jim O'Rourke – piano (1, 3, 4, 10), bass (2, 5), electric guitar (3, 5, 6, 12), ARP 2600 (3), acoustic guitar (4, 8), Korg CX-3 organ (7), loops, filters, synths (11)
- Frankie Montuoro – hammered dulcimer (5)
- Karen Waltuch – viola (5)
- Tim Barnes – percussion (6)

=== Technical personnel ===
- Wilco – production
- Jim O'Rourke – production, mixing, engineering
- Chris Shaw – engineer
- TJ Doherty – assistant engineer
- Tim Iseler – assistant engineer
- Mikael Jorgensen – engineer
- Steve Rooke – mastering
- Frankie Montuoro – production assistant, technical assistance
- Stan Doty, Daniel Herbst, Deborah Miles Johnson, Haydn Johnston, Matt Zivich – production assistants, technical assistance
- Dan Nadel – graphic design
- Peter Buchanan-Smith – graphic design, photography
- Mike Schmelling – photography
- Gladys Nilsson – drawing
- Ken Waagner – digital supervisor

== Charts ==
2004 chart performance for A Ghost Is Born
Chart (2004)	Peak position
Australian Albums (ARIA)	43
Austrian Albums (Ö3 Austria)	75
Belgian Albums (Ultratop Flanders)	34
Dutch Albums (Album Top 100)	94
French Albums (SNEP)	186
German Albums (Offizielle Top 100)	41
Irish Albums (IRMA)	37
Italian Albums (FIMI)	27
New Zealand Albums (RMNZ)	33
Norwegian Albums (VG-lista)	24
Swedish Albums (Sverigetopplistan)	29
UK Albums (Official Charts)	50
US Billboard 200	8

2025 chart performance for A Ghost Is Born
Chart (2025)	Peak position
Hungarian Physical Albums (MAHASZ)	8
