= The Whole Love =

Studio album by Wilco
- Released: September 27, 2011
- Genre: Art rock; indie rock
- Length: 55:40
- Label: dBpm
- Producer: Jeff Tweedy, Pat Sansone and Tom Schick

Wilco chronology
Wilco (The Album) (2009)	The Whole Love (2011)	Alpha Mike Foxtrot: Rare Tracks 1994–2014 (2014)

The Whole Love is the eighth studio album by the American rock band Wilco, released on September 27, 2011. It is the first Wilco album that was released on their own label dBpm. Attendees at Wilco's 2011 Solid Sound Festival at the Massachusetts Museum of Contemporary Art from June 24 to 26 could purchase the first single from the album, "I Might". The entire album was streamed live on Wilco's official website for 24 hours between September 3 and 4, 2011, and later streamed on National Public Radio. The album packaging and cover art are pieces by Joanne Greenbaum. On November 30, 2011, the album received a nomination in the 54th Grammy Awards for Best Rock Album.

In 2012, it was awarded a gold certification from the Independent Music Companies Association which indicated sales of at least 75,000 copies throughout Europe.

== Reception ==
Professional ratings
Aggregate scores
Source	Rating
AnyDecentMusic?	7.9/10
Metacritic	83/100
Review scores
Source	Rating
AllMusic	4.5/5 stars
The A.V. Club	B
Chicago Tribune	3/4 stars
Entertainment Weekly	A−
The Guardian	4/5 stars
Los Angeles Times	3.5/4 stars
NME	7/10
Pitchfork	6.9/10
Rolling Stone	4/5 stars
Spin	8/10

At Metacritic, which assigns a normalized rating out of 100 to reviews from mainstream critics, the album received an average score of 83, based on 40 reviews, which indicates "universal acclaim".

Uncut placed the album at number 15 on its list of "Top 50 albums of 2011". Rolling Stone magazine rated it as the 8th best album of 2011. Mojo placed the album at number 29 on its list of "Top 50 albums of 2011."

== Track listings ==
=== Compact Disc ===
All tracks are written by Jeff Tweedy, except where noted.

No.	Title	Length
1.	"Art of Almost"	7:17
2.	"I Might"	4:02
3.	"Sunloathe"	3:20
4.	"Dawned on Me"	3:43
5.	"Black Moon"	3:57
6.	"Born Alone"	3:55
7.	"Open Mind"	3:40
8.	"Capitol City"	4:04
9.	"Standing O"	3:29
10.	"Rising Red Lung"	3:10
11.	"Whole Love"	3:50
12.	"One Sunday Morning (Song for Jane Smiley's Boyfriend)"	12:04

iTunes and Deluxe edition bonus tracks
No.	Title	Length
13.	"I Love My Label" (Lowe/Profile)	3:29
14.	"Message from Mid-Bar"	4:47
15.	"Speak into the Rose"	6:38
16.	"Black Moon" (Alternate)	3:54
17.	"Sometimes It Happens" (Patten/Westbrook) (only on iTunes edition)	4:23

=== Vinyl ===
Side A

1. "Art of Almost"
2. "I Might"
3. "Sunloathe"

Side B

4. "Dawned on Me"
5. "Black Moon"
6. "Born Alone"
7. "Open Mind"

Side C

8. "Capitol City"
9. "Standing O"
10. "Rising Red Lung"
11. "Whole Love"

Side D

12. "One Sunday Morning (Song for Jane Smiley's Boyfriend)"
13. "Sometimes It Happens" (Patten/Westbrook)

== Personnel ==
=== Wilco ===
- Nels Cline – electric guitar (1, 6, 8, 11, 12), loops (1, 3, 7, 11), slide guitar (2, 6, 8), electric 6 and 12 string guitars (3, 4, 9, 10), lap steel (3, 5, 7), dobro (3), ukulele (9, 10)
- Glenn Kotche – drums (1–12), percussion (1–5, 7–12), cimbalom (1), siren (4), field recordings (8), kaossilator (11)
- Mikael Jorgensen – synthesizers (1–11), keyboards (1–3, 5–7, 9–11), programming (1), vocal processing (3), piano (4, 6), "ah" sample (5), Guzheng samples (7), Wurlitzer (8), wavetable scrubbing (12)
- Patrick Sansone – Mellotron (1, 4, 8), acoustic guitar (1, 12), electric guitar (1, 4–7, 9–11), tambourine (1), piano (2, 3, 7, 8), glockenspiel (2, 4, 8, 11), music stand (2), vocals (2–11), percussion (4–6, 9–11), ukulele (4), string arrangement (5), organ (8), vibraphone (12)
- John Stirratt – bass guitar (1–12), piano (2), vocals (2–4, 6–8)
- Jeff Tweedy – vocals (1–12), acoustic guitar (1, 2, 4, 5, 7, 9–12), electric guitar (3, 6, 8, 11), bass guitar (4)

=== Additional musicians ===
- Matt Albert – violin (5), viola (5)
- Nick Photinos – cello (5)
