= Warmer (Jeff Tweedy album) =

Studio album by Jeff Tweedy
- Released: April 13, 2019
- Studio: The Loft (Chicago, IL)
- Length: 32:06
- Label: dBpm
- Producer: Jeff Tweedy; Tom Schick

Jeff Tweedy chronology
Warm (2018)	Warmer (2019)	Love Is the King (2020)

Singles from Warmer
- 1. "Family Ghost" Released: April 9, 2019

Professional ratings
Aggregate scores
Source	Rating
Metacritic	83/100
Review scores
Source	Rating
Paste	9/10
Pitchfork	7.6/10
Rolling Stone	4/5 stars

Warmer is the third solo studio album by American musician Jeff Tweedy. It was initially released on April 13, 2019, via dBpm Records on vinyl as a Record Store Day exclusive, and saw wider digital release on July 12, 2019. It was recorded at The Loft in Chicago at the same time as his previous album, Warm, marking it his second solo album of entirely new material. Production was handled by Tweedy himself together with Tom Schick.

The album peaked at No. 61 on the Top Album Sales, No. 23 on the Americana/Folk Albums and No. 11 on the Independent Albums charts in the United States, and No. 11 on the Official Independent Album Breakers Chart in the UK. It was also met with universal acclaim from music critics. At Metacritic, which assigns a normalized rating out of 100 to reviews from mainstream publications, the album received an average score of 83 based on four reviews.

== Track listing ==
No.	Title	Length
1.	"Orphan"	2:52
2.	"Family Ghost"	3:08
3.	"...And Then You Cut It in Half"	4:34
4.	"Ten Sentences"	3:26
5.	"Sick Server"	2:54
6.	"Empty Head"	3:34
7.	"Landscape"	3:02
8.	"Ultra Orange Room"	2:40
9.	"Evergreen"	2:30
10.	"Guaranteed"	3:26
Total length:		32:06

== Personnel ==
- Jeff Tweedy – vocals, instruments, producer, engineering, mixing, design
- Spencer Tweedy – drums
- Tom Schick – producer, engineering, mixing
- Mark Greenberg – engineering assistant, design
- Bob Ludwig – mastering
- Sammy Tweedy – photography
- Sheila Sachs – design

== Charts ==
Chart (2019)	Peak position
US Top Album Sales (Billboard)	61
US Folk Albums (Billboard)	23
US Independent Albums (Billboard)	11
