= Warm (Jeff Tweedy album) =

Studio album by Jeff Tweedy
- Released: November 30, 2018
- Studios: The Loft, Chicago, Illinois
- Length: 39:41
- Label: dBpm
- Producers: Jeff Tweedy; Tom Schick

Jeff Tweedy chronology
Together at Last (2017)	Warm (2018)	Warmer (2019)

Singles from Warm
- 1. "Some Birds" Released: September 24, 2018; 2. "Let's Go Rain" Released: November 13, 2018; 3. "I Know What It's Like" Released: November 27, 2018

Warm is the second studio album by American musician Jeff Tweedy, released on November 30, 2018, by dBpm Records. It is his first solo album of entirely new material.

It was released shortly after the release of Tweedy's memoir, Let's Go (So We Can Get Back).

== Critical reception ==
Professional ratings
Aggregate scores
Source	Rating
AnyDecentMusic?	8.1/10
Metacritic	84/100
Review scores
Source	Rating
AllMusic	4/5 stars
Chicago Tribune	3/4 stars
Consequence of Sound	B+
The Guardian	4/5 stars
Mojo	4/5 stars
NME	4/5 stars
Pitchfork	8.3/10
PopMatters	8/10
Q	4/5 stars
Rolling Stone	4/5 stars

Warm has received positive reviews from critics. At Metacritic, which assigns a normalised rating out of 100 to reviews from mainstream publications, the album received an average score of 84, based on 21 reviews.

== Track listing ==
All tracks are written by Jeff Tweedy.

No.	Title	Length
1.	"Bombs Above"	2:15
2.	"Some Birds"	3:41
3.	"Don't Forget"	3:30
4.	"How Hard It Is for a Desert to Die"	4:49
5.	"Let's Go Rain"	2:57
6.	"From Far Away"	3:10
7.	"I Know What It's Like"	3:46
8.	"Having Been Is No Way to Be"	4:34
9.	"The Red Brick"	2:36
10.	"Warm (When the Sun Has Died)"	2:18
11.	"How Will I Find You?"	6:05
Total length:		39:41

== Personnel ==
Credits adapted from liner notes.

Musicians

- Jeff Tweedy – vocals, songwriting, instruments
- Spencer Tweedy – drums (1–3, 5–10), synthesizer (8)
- Sammy Tweedy – backing vocals (2), synthesizer (6)
- Glenn Kotche – drums (11)
- Ava Brennan – backing vocals (2)

Technical personnel

- Jeff Tweedy – production, engineering [with], mixing [with], design
- Tom Schick – mixing, engineering, production [with]
- Bob Ludwig – mastering
- Mark Greenberg – assistant engineering, studio management, design
- Spencer Tweedy – design
- Sammy Tweedy – photography
- Sheila Sachs – design
- Phoebe Randall – title constellation illustration
- George Saunders – liner notes
- Jacob Daneman – publicity
- Jessica Linker – publicity
- Sam McAllister – publicity
- Frank Riley – booking
- Dawn Nepp – financial management
- Josh Grier – legal
- Davi Rodrigues de Lima – lacquer cut

== Charts ==
Chart (2018)	Peak position
Belgian Albums (Ultratop Flanders)	75
Scottish Albums (Official Charts)	83
US Billboard 200	87
