= Shot in the arm =

Shot in the arm can mean:

- A Shot in the Arm, a 1999 single by American band Wilco from their album Summerteeth
- See bullet wound
- A metaphor for a stimulus, as if by hypodermic injection
