= Sunken treasure =

Sunken treasure may refer to:

- Goods or treasure lost in a shipwreck, some of which is later found during marine salvage
- "Sunken Treasure," a song by Wilco from their 1996 album Being There
- Sunken Treasure: Live in the Pacific Northwest, a 2006 live DVD by Jeff Tweedy of Wilco
- Sunken Treasure, the first mission in the Beach Bowl Galaxy from the video game Super Mario Galaxy
