= Sunken Treasure: Live in the Pacific Northwest =

Live album (DVD) by Jeff Tweedy
- Released: October 24, 2006
- Recorded: February 2006
- Venue: Various locations
- Genre: Indie, folk, alternative
- Label: Nonesuch

Jeff Tweedy chronology
Kicking Television: Live in Chicago (2005)	Sunken Treasure: Live in the Pacific Northwest (2006)

Sunken Treasure: Live in the Pacific Northwest is a DVD featuring live performances by Jeff Tweedy. The DVD was released on October 24, 2006. The DVD enables the user to download MP3s of each track on the DVD and seven others from the same tour. The AV Club gave it a rating score of B+.

== Track features ==
1. Sunken Treasure – 6:05
2. Theologians – 3:14
3. The Ruling Class – 3:01
4. How to Fight Loneliness – 3:58
5. Summerteeth – 3:06
6. The Thanks I Get – 3:33
7. I Am Trying to Break Your Heart – 4:03
8. ELT – 3:28
9. Shot in the Arm – 5:57
10. Black Eye – 2:34
11. In a Future Age – 3:07
12. Laminated Cat (w/ Kotche) – 4:34
13. (Was I) In Your Dreams – 3:04
14. Airline to Heaven (w/ Cline) – 4:11
15. Heavy Metal Drummer (w/ Kotche) – 3:13
16. War on War (w/ Kotche and Cline) – 3:24
17. Acuff-Rose – 3:09
18. California Stars – 4:34

=== MP3 only ===
1. Please Tell My Brother
2. She's a Jar
3. Satan Your Kingdom Must Come Down
4. The Family Gardener
5. Radio King
6. One by One

During live solo performances, Jeff Tweedy draws from 200-plus songs with no definite set list necessarily in mind. The songs featured on the DVD feature music from Tweedy’s four bands: Uncle Tupelo, Wilco, Golden Smog, and Loose Fur. (The previously unreleased track “The Thanks I Get,” played in concert by Wilco, is also included.)

Wilco percussionist Glenn Kotche and guitarist Nels Cline, who opened for him on the February tour, also make guest appearances in Sunken Treasure, accompanying Tweedy on several songs.

The DVD also features a Weblink, which allows the owner to download MP3s of the 17 tracks on the DVD and seven others from the same tour.

Downloadable tracks include Tweedy's conversations with audience, not only songs.
