= Sukierae =

Studio album by Tweedy
- Released: September 23, 2014
- Label: dBpm
- Producer: Jeff Tweedy

Sukierae is the debut album by Tweedy, a side project formed by Jeff Tweedy and his son Spencer. It is a double album featuring 20 new songs and was released by Dbpm Records on September 23, 2014. The album was promoted by a new band touring under the Tweedy name.

== Background and recording ==
After producing albums for Low, White Denim, and Mavis Staples, Jeff Tweedy set out to create a solo album. From the start, the album was intended to be more than simply acoustic guitar and vocals. While recording demos, Tweedy's son Spencer joined him to record drums and "[help] the songs take shape". Tweedy had most previously worked with his son when they both appeared on the split single for the "Songs For Slim" series in 2013. Sukierae was completed mostly by the two of them, but also features additional vocals by Jess Wolfe and Holly Laessig of the band Lucius, as well as keyboards by Scott McCaughey.

In an interview with The Atlantic, Tweedy spoke about the creative process of making the album and why he decided to release it as a solo album instead of a new Wilco album:

"I like to include elements of early recordings on the finished records when I can. Almost every song on Sukierae has an original demo element somewhere in there. A lot of my iPhone acoustic demos became the basic tracks we overdubbed to, and they're still there in the finished record. (That's why we listed the iPhone as an instrument in the track notes.) The song "I'll Sing It" includes a cassette recording from a "Being There" -era demo of that song. Stuff lies around forever, and for this record it was fun to make some use of it.

"It's a totally different process working with an ensemble. Wilco is a six-piece band, and its members have varying degrees of interest in the finishing touches. As a collective, we always gravitate towards something much more fully realized—and that's the pleasure of it. Working on my own, I always hope to abandon something before I feel like I've made all of the choices that could be made. If I commit too much to one approach, I mourn all the choices that weren't made when I get to that point. I think that's one way Sukierae would have been different if it had been recorded by Wilco. I can still hear possible overdubs on every track, I can still hear things I could have done, and that's the most enjoyable part for me. It's the same thing I love about Daniel Johnston's music—all that unrealized potential."

Jeff Tweedy had mentioned that he had 90 new songs that he had written, but not recorded, when interviewed in 2013 about the prospect of a new Wilco album. Material for a new album has since been recorded, but so far has not been released. In the meantime, all members of the band have released or appeared on numerous albums, from one-off collaborations, to their more closely related projects of The Autumn Defense and The Nels Cline Singers.

In an interview with The Guardian Tweedy shared his thoughts on the Album as a format in 2014. He also elaborated on the creative process of sequencing Sukierae as a double album:

"I've just made a double album, Sukierae, which has two distinct discs. I understand in this day and age there might not be many people who will listen to it that way, but it doesn't matter – because I want to listen that way. I'm not a curmudgeon, a luddite or anti-modern technology doomsayer. I just want to listen to the album and have a feeling that one part, has ended, and now I can take a little breather before I listen to the second part. Or I can listen to the second part another time. It's a double record on vinyl, so there are three breaks like that. I wanted it to have different identities artistically and the album format allows me to do that."

"Working toward Sukierae I must have written or recorded around 90 songs. I was pretty sold on the idea of two really good-sounding vinyl sides, but no matter how we tried to sequence the songs, we kept getting halfway into another record. Then, in the last couple of weeks of recording, I had this burst and recorded five new songs, which all started to feel like part of a whole other record. So, we sequenced it as disc one and disc two. The album gets simpler and softer and bolder at the same time. The idea is that as it winds down it gets clearer."

"These are key tracks but deliberately placed to be heard in the middle of the album. Listening to it all at once is a leap of faith, but I know that the idea of listening to a work all the way through and being taken along for the whole ride is becoming antiquated for a lot of people."

The album was released through dBpm Records, a record label founded by the members of Wilco in 2011. It is the third album release by the label, following The Whole Love and its corresponding deluxe edition release.

== Touring band ==
Jeff and Spencer Tweedy rounded out the project into a full band in order to tour, adding Jim Elkington as an additional guitarist, bassist Darin Gray, and keyboardist/guitarist Liam Cunningham. The band first played at the Detroit Masonic Temple on June 5, where they played 13 of the songs from the new album.

During a Tweedy show, the first half features the full band playing many of the songs from Sukierae, exclusively. So far, the band has not played "I'll Sing It" the first single from the album. For the second half, Jeff Tweedy plays a solo acoustic set. At this point, he does not play additional material from Sukierae, but instead draws from songs from his careers in Wilco and Uncle Tupelo, along with covers and songs from other projects. These acoustic sets are effectively truncated versions of the solo acoustic performances that Jeff Tweedy has done concurrently throughout his tenure in Wilco.

== Promotion ==
On May 18, 2014, it was announced that Jeff Tweedy would be releasing a solo album in September, and that he would also begin a solo tour. It was not until June 4 that the nature of the band was revealed, along with its name, number of songs, and a stream for the song "I'll Sing It". This song was named the first single from the forthcoming album. "Summer Noon" followed in the form of a music video, and on July 8, it was released as part of the soundtrack to the Richard Linklater film Boyhood. Third was "Wait For Love", previewed both in its album form, and as a video of a solo acoustic performance.

The song "Diamond Light, Pt. 1" was premiered on Stereogum as a SoundCloud stream, and along with "Diamond Light, Pt. 2" was released on a 10" vinyl record on June 17. While "Diamond Light, Pt. 1" would go on to appear on Sukierae, "Diamond Light, Pt. 2" only appears on this release. This release was limited to 2,000 copies and was pressed on virgin "clear/smoke" vinyl. Both sides of the record end with a locked groove (uncommon for 10" records).

Lastly, the song Fake Fur Coat was premiered on VH1 music on July 24.

On July 24, Tweedy performed "Summer Noon" and "High As Hello" on The Tonight Show.

== Track listing ==
All tracks are written by Jeff Tweedy

Side one
| No. | Title | Length |
|---|---|---|
| 1. | "Please Don't Let Me Be So Understood" | 1:33 |
| 2. | "High as Hello" | 3:56 |
| 3. | "World Away" | 3:31 |
| 4. | "Diamond Light Pt. 1" | 6:13 |
| 5. | "Wait for Love" | 3:07 |

Side two
| No. | Title | Length |
|---|---|---|
| 6. | "Low Key" | 3:15 |
| 7. | "Pigeons" | 3:09 |
| 8. | "Slow Love" | 5:32 |
| 9. | "Nobody Dies Anymore" | 4:58 |
| 10. | "I'll Sing It" | 4:02 |

Side three
| No. | Title | Length |
|---|---|---|
| 11. | "Flowering" | 2:54 |
| 12. | "Desert Bell" | 3:18 |
| 13. | "Summer Noon" | 3:33 |
| 14. | "Honey Combed" | 2:42 |
| 15. | "New Moon" | 3:39 |

Side four
| No. | Title | Length |
|---|---|---|
| 16. | "Down from Above" | 4:25 |
| 17. | "Where My Love" | 3:42 |
| 18. | "Fake Fur Coat" | 2:24 |
| 19. | "Hazel" | 2:36 |
| 20. | "I'll Never Know" | 3:13 |

== Musicians ==
- Jeff Tweedy – vocals (1–20), guitar (1–20), bass (1–4, 6–13, 15–17, 19), iPhone track (1, 2, 3, 8, 14), keyboard (2, 4, 13), piano (4, 7–9, 17, 20), electric sitar (10), cassette (10), mellotron (17)
- Spencer Tweedy – drums (1–6, 8–13, 15–17, 19), percussion (2, 6, 13, 15)
- Jess Wolfe – background vocals (2, 5, 6, 8–10, 17, 20)
- Holly Laessig – background vocals (2, 5, 6, 8–10, 17, 20)
- Scott McCaughey – piano (5, 6, 11–13, 16), mellotron (6), typewriter (13), vibraphone (16)

== Charts ==
Sales chart performance for Sukierae
| Chart (2014) | Peak position |
|---|---|
| Belgian Albums (Ultratop Flanders) | 43 |
| Dutch Albums (Album Top 100) | 47 |
| German Albums (Offizielle Top 100) | 65 |
| Spanish Albums (Promusicae) | 46 |
| UK Albums (Official Charts) | 67 |
| US Billboard 200 | 21 |
| US Americana/Folk Albums (Billboard) | 3 |
| US Independent Albums (Billboard) | 4 |
| US Top Rock Albums (Billboard) | 7 |
