= Let's Go (so We Can Get Back) =

2018 memoir by Jeff Tweedy

- Author: Jeff Tweedy
- Language: English
- Publisher: Dutton
- Publication date: November 13, 2018
- Publication place: United States
- Pages: 304
- ISBN: 978-1-10-198526-7 (hardcover)

Let's Go (so We Can Get Back): A Memoir of Recording and Discording with Wilco, Etc. is a memoir by American musician and Wilco frontman Jeff Tweedy. It was published on November 13, 2018 by Dutton Books, an imprint of Penguin Publishing Group.

It was released shortly before the release of Warm, Tweedy's first solo album of entirely new material.

== Summary ==
Let's Go is a memoir covering Tweedy's childhood in Belleville, Illinois, his music career with Uncle Tupelo and Wilco, his songwriting process, his family, and his struggles with addiction and depression.

== Release ==
The book reached number six on The New York Times Hardcover Nonfiction best-sellers list.

== Reception ==
The book was well received by critics. It was included in Pitchfork's list "The Best Music Books of 2018" and Rolling Stone's list "The Best Music Books of 2018".
