= DBpm Records =

American record label

dBpm Records
- Founded: 2011
- Founder: Jeff Tweedy, Tony Margherita
- Distributors: Sony Music Entertainment; Anti-
- Genre: Alternative rock; indie rock
- Country of origin: United States
- Location: Chicago, IL
- Official website: dbpmrecords.com

dBpm Records is an American record label based in Chicago, Illinois, and founded in 2011 by Grammy Award winning, alternative rock band Wilco. The label has released all of Wilco's albums since The Whole Love in 2011. It was aided by ADA for distribution, until the label had a new distribution agreement with Sony Music Entertainment in 2023; Cousin was the first release under the new distribution agreement. The label has also released Don't Lose This by Pop Staples; Sukierae, an album created by Jeff Tweedy and his son Spencer Tweedy; a set of solo albums by Jeff Tweedy called WARM + WARMER; and most recently, the final live album by the late Daniel Johnston, Chicago 2017.

== Studio albums ==
Album	Artist	Release date
The Whole Love	Wilco	September 27, 2011
Sukierae	Tweedy	September 23, 2014
Don't Lose This	Pops Staples	February 13, 2015
Star Wars	Wilco	July 16, 2015
Schmilco	Wilco	September 9, 2016
Together At Last	Jeff Tweedy	June 23, 2017
WARM	Jeff Tweedy	November 30, 2018
WARMER	Jeff Tweedy	April 13, 2019
Ode to Joy	Wilco	October 4, 2019
Chicago 2017	Daniel Johnston	January 15, 2020
Love is the King	Jeff Tweedy	October 29, 2020
Cruel Country	Wilco	May 27, 2022
Cousin	Wilco	September 29, 2023
Twilight Override	Jeff Tweedy	September 26, 2025
