= Jeff Tweedy =

American musician (born 1967)

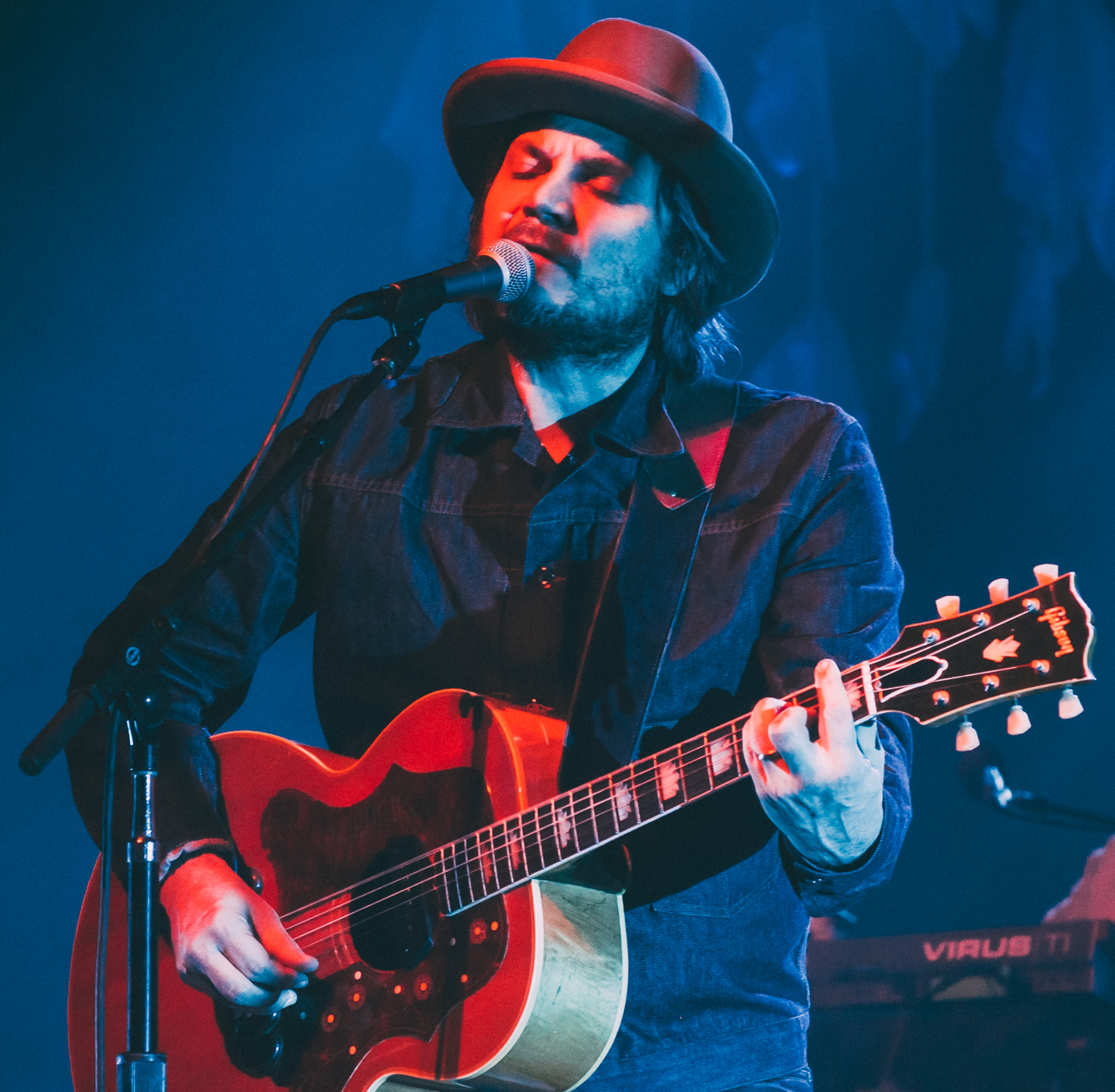
- Tweedy performing in 2012

Background information
- Born: Jeffrey Scot Tweedy; August 25, 1967 (age 59); Belleville, Illinois, U.S.
- Genres: Alternative country; alternative rock; indie rock; country rock
- Occupations: Musician; singer; songwriter; author; record producer
- Instruments: Vocals; guitar; bass; harmonica
- Years active: 1984–present
- Labels: Giant/Rockville; Sire; Reprise; Nonesuch; Drag City; dBpm
- Member of: Wilco; Golden Smog; Tweedy
- Formerly of: Uncle Tupelo; The Minus 5; Loose Fur; The Racoonists

Signature
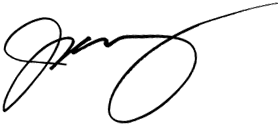

Jeffrey Scot Tweedy (born August 25, 1967) is an American musician, author, and record producer, best known as the lead vocalist and guitarist of the band Wilco. Tweedy, originally from Belleville, Illinois, began his music career in high school with his band The Plebes along with Jay Farrar, also in the band. The Plebes later became the alternative country band Uncle Tupelo.

After Uncle Tupelo broke up, Tweedy formed Wilco which found critical and commercial success, most notably with Yankee Hotel Foxtrot and A Ghost Is Born. The latter received a Grammy for Best Alternative Album in 2005.

During his career Tweedy has released 20 studio albums including four with Uncle Tupelo, twelve with Wilco, one with his son Spencer, a solo acoustic album, three solo studio albums, along with numerous collaborations with other musicians, most notably Mermaid Avenue with Billy Bragg.

== Early life ==
Tweedy was born in Belleville on August 25, 1967, the fourth child of Bob and JoAnn Tweedy (née Werkmeister). Bob Tweedy (died August 4, 2017) worked for Alton & Southern Railroad in East St. Louis; JoAnn was a housemaker. Tweedy grew up with three siblings, older brother Greg Tweedy (died in 2013), brother Steven Tweedy, and sister Debbie Voll.

Tweedy's mother bought him his first guitar when he was six years old, although he did not begin to play it seriously until he was twelve. Apparently Tweedy told people that he knew how to play the guitar once he got his first guitar, even though he did not know how to play.

When he was twelve, Tweedy was injured in a bicycle accident and was laid up for the summer. He decided to learn how to play a few chords before somebody "called him out" on the lie. On an appearance of The Late Show with Stephen Colbert, he remembered attending an X concert as a youngster in St. Louis. The Replacements opened, and Paul Westerberg, their guitarist and vocalist, fell off the stage while performing. Tweedy recalls thinking "That looks like fun!"

In 1981, when Tweedy was fourteen years old, he befriended Jay Farrar during an English class at Belleville Township High School West. All of the members of Farrar's family enjoyed playing music; he already knew rock and roll music very well. By that time, Tweedy was a fan of The Ramones and country music while Farrar enjoyed The Sex Pistols. Tweedy attended Belleville Area College and Southern Illinois University Edwardsville.

== Career ==
=== Early music ===
In the early 1980s, Tweedy joined The Plebes, a rockabilly band, with brothers Wade and Dade Farrar which Tweedy joined in order to qualify for a battle of the bands competition. They won. Tweedy pushed The Plebes away from the rockabilly music that they had been playing, which caused Dade Farrar to leave the band. The band renamed themselves The Primitives in 1984, taking their name from a song by garage rock band The Groupies. Wade Farrar sang lead vocals and played harmonica, Jay Farrar played guitar, Tweedy played bass guitar, and Mike Heidorn played drums. In late 1986, the band decided to change their name to Uncle Tupelo, because a more popular British band was also using the name "The Primitives". The Primitives went on hiatus in 1986 after Wade Farrar left the band to finish his engineering degree at Southern Illinois University. While waiting for Wade to return from campus, Farrar, Tweedy, and Heidorn formed Uncle Tupelo.

=== Uncle Tupelo (1987–1994) ===
At his parents' request, Tweedy attended several universities, but dropped out of all of them to concentrate on Uncle Tupelo. While moonlighting as a record store clerk at Euclid Records in St. Louis, Tweedy met Tony Margherita. After Margherita saw the band perform at an acoustic concert in 1988, he decided to become the band's manager. The band began playing regular shows at Cicero's basement bar in the Delmar Loop near Washington University in St. Louis with other bands playing in a similar style. Uncle Tupelo recorded a ten-track demo tape entitled Not Forever, Just For Now in 1989, attracting the attention of Giant/Rockville Records. The independent label signed the band, and Uncle Tupelo's first album, No Depression, was released the next year. The title song, originally performed by the Carter Family, became strongly associated with the alternative country scene, and became the name of an influential alternative country periodical called No Depression.

During times when Uncle Tupelo was not touring, Tweedy and Farrar played as Coffee Creek, a short-lived cover band with The Bottle Rockets' Brian Henneman and Mark Ortmann. Around this time, Tweedy began developing problems with alcohol, leading to tensions between Tweedy and Farrar. While he never refused to play a gig, Tweedy was forced to sit out in place of Henneman at some performances. Tweedy quit drinking entirely after meeting future wife Sue Miller, although he replaced this habit with smoking marijuana. However, after developing a dependence on marijuana, he quickly quit using it, as well. After releasing Still Feel Gone, the band formed a friendship with Peter Buck of R.E.M., who produced their third album March 16–20, 1992 for free. Uncle Tupelo left the Rockville label in favor of Sire Records (Warner) later in 1992 because Rockville refused to pay the band any royalties for their albums. After the signing, Max Johnston and John Stirratt joined the band as Mike Heidorn was replaced by Bill Belzer who was later replaced by Ken Coomer. The five-piece band recorded Anodyne, which sold over 150,000 copies and debuted at number 18 on the Billboard Heatseekers chart, but was the last album Uncle Tupelo released.

==== Breakup ====
In January 1994, Farrar called Tony Margherita to tell him that the band was breaking up, saying that he was not having any fun in the band anymore and was not getting along with Tweedy. Tweedy was enraged that Farrar decided to break up the band without notifying him, and this led to a series of harsh verbal exchanges. Farrar and Tweedy agreed to a final Uncle Tupelo tour, but the concerts were marred by the two not participating in each other's songs. The band decided to play Tweedy's "The Long Cut" on Late Night with Conan O'Brien, which further distanced Farrar and Tweedy. Farrar began to assemble a new band named Son Volt with Mike Heidorn, bassist Jim Boquist, and his brother Dave Boquist. At the same time, Jeff Tweedy formed Wilco with Stirratt, Johnston, and Coomer.

=== Wilco (1995–present) ===
In 1994, Tweedy formed Wilco with John Stirratt, Max Johnston, and Ken Coomer. Wilco has released twelve albums and found commercial success with their albums Yankee Hotel Foxtrot, A Ghost Is Born, Sky Blue Sky and Wilco. The band also released two collaboration albums with Billy Bragg and one with The Minus 5. Jeff Tweedy has been the recipient of two Grammy Awards, including Best Alternative Album for A Ghost Is Born. Tweedy has also participated in a number of side groups including Golden Smog and Loose Fur, published a book of poems, and released a DVD of solo performances. He was originally influenced by punk and country music, but has later reflected more experimental themes in his music.

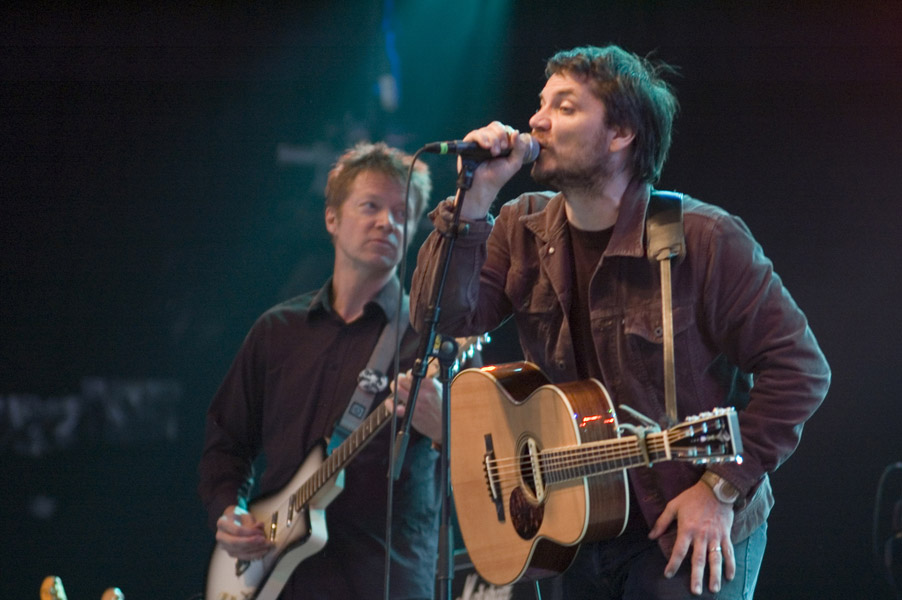
Tweedy singing with Wilco in 2007

Wilco signed with Reprise/Warner Bros. Records and began recording AM almost as soon as the band was formed. After recording, Tweedy was introduced to Jay Bennett, who then joined the band. Also during this time, Tweedy quit smoking marijuana after a particularly bad experience with some cannabis brownies. A.M. did not fare as well commercially in comparison to Son Volt's first album, only reaching number 27 on the Heatseekers chart while Son Volt's debut Trace hit the Billboard 200. Dan Murphy of Soul Asylum invited Tweedy to join him in a supergroup named Golden Smog with Gary Louris and Marc Perlman of the Jayhawks, Kraig Johnson of Run Westy Run, and Noah Levy of The Honeydogs. Under the pseudonym Scott Summit, Tweedy released Down by the Old Mainstream with Golden Smog in 1996.

Tweedy and Wilco began to explore new styles and broke from the style of previous recordings on the seminal sprawling double album Being There in 1996. Tweedy did not write music for many of the songs ahead of time, and welcomed unexpected sounds into the recording. Wilco recorded nineteen songs for the double-CD album, and wanted the label to release it with a retail price comparable to a single-CD release. Being There was a commercial success, selling 300,000 copies and peaking in the top half of the Billboard 200. Reprise records invested $100,000 in the single "Outta Mind (Outtasite)", but received little radio exposure. While on tour, Tweedy began to spend time reading books by William H. Gass, Henry Miller, and John Fante. As he read their books, Tweedy decided to place more of an emphasis on writing. Representatives in the A&R department of Reprise wanted a radio single from Summerteeth, and Wilco reluctantly agreed to a re-working of "Can't Stand It". The single was a top five hit on adult album alternative radio stations, but failed to cross over to a larger audience.

Before the release of Summerteeth, the daughter of the late folk legend Woody Guthrie contacted folk rock singer Billy Bragg, who in turn contacted Tweedy about recording an album of unreleased Woody Guthrie songs. Tweedy was indifferent to the idea of working with Bragg, but Jay Bennett's enthusiasm about the idea convinced Tweedy to get the band involved in the project. As a result of Tweedy's feelings on the political nature of some of the lyrics, Bragg recorded mostly political songs while Wilco recorded more neutral songs. Almost all of the songs that appeared on Mermaid Avenue and Mermaid Avenue Vol. II were recorded over a six-day period in December 1997. The first Mermaid Avenue album and a second Golden Smog album (Weird Tales) were released in 1998, Summerteeth was released in early 1999, and Mermaid Avenue Vol. II was released in 2000. Tweedy received his first Grammy nomination when Mermaid Avenue was nominated for Grammy Award for Best Contemporary Folk Album in 1999.

==== Yankee Hotel Foxtrot ====
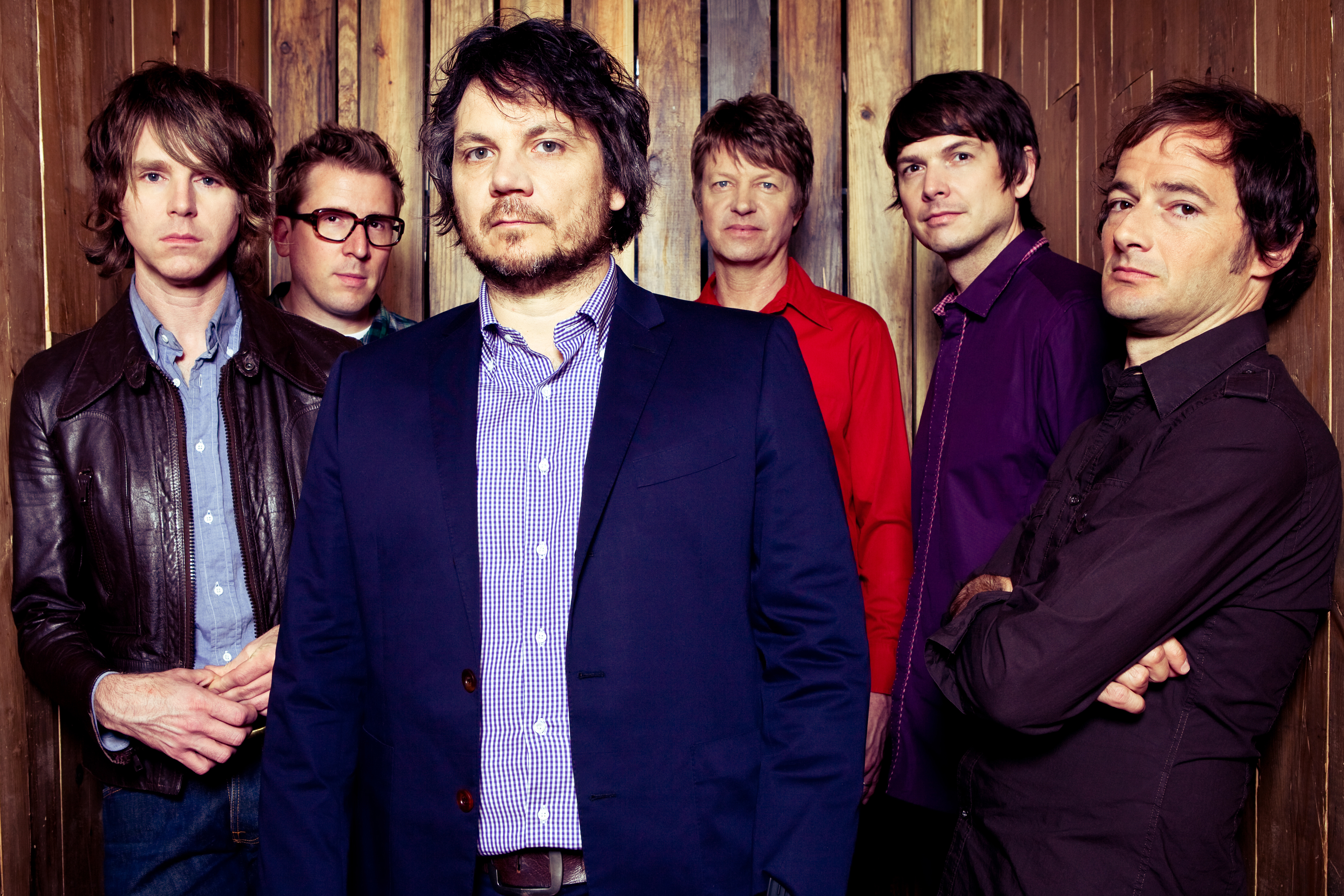
Wilco at MASS MoCA

Jeff Tweedy was invited to play at Chicago's Noise Pop festival, and was told that he could collaborate with a musician of his choosing. Tweedy chose Jim O'Rourke based on his fascination with O'Rourke's Bad Timing album. O'Rourke offered to bring drummer Glenn Kotche to the festival, and the trio formed a side project named Loose Fur. The other band members of Wilco had written a number of songs for Yankee Hotel Foxtrot, but Tweedy was unsatisfied with them because he believed that the songs did not sound like the ones he played with Loose Fur. Tweedy became such a fan of Kotche's playing style that he decided to dismiss Ken Coomer from the band in favor of Kotche. Tweedy had strong feelings about how songs should be sequenced, which clashed with Jay Bennett's focus on the songs themselves. Because Bennett was mixing the album, this led to a series of arguments between songs about how the album should sound. Tweedy asked O'Rourke to remix several songs on the album that had been mixed by Bennett, which caused tensions within the band to escalate. The album was completed in June 2001, and Tweedy was insistent that it was in its final form. Tweedy also fired Bennett around this time, believing (according to Bennett) that Wilco should only have one core member. The band maintains that the firing of Bennett was a collective decision.

Reprise Records' parent company Time Warner merged with America Online in 2001, and the recording company was asked to cut costs. Howie Klein, the CEO of Reprise Records, considered Wilco to be one of the label's core bands, but was offered a lucrative buy-out by AOL Time Warner. Reprise did not consider the album commercially viable and was not interested in releasing the album. David Kahne (Head of A&R) agreed to release Wilco from Reprise under the condition that Wilco got to keep all legal entitlements to the Yankee Hotel Foxtrot album. After an article in the Chicago Tribune publicly described these managerial practices, CEO Gary Briggs quit. Shortly after leaving the label, Briggs remarked:

It [dropping Wilco from the label] should never have happened. One of the most embarrassing moments in my career at Warner Brothers was the day they let Wilco go. It broke my heart, and it told me that I no longer have a home there.

Yankee Hotel Foxtrot was originally scheduled to be released on Reprise on September 11, 2001, prior to the band's departure from Reprise. Seven days later, Tweedy decided that he would stream the entirety of Yankee Hotel Foxtrot on Wilco's official website. Over thirty record labels offered to release Yankee Hotel Foxtrot after the departure from Reprise was official. One of the thirty was Warner Brothers affiliate Nonesuch Records, who signed Wilco in November 2001. AOL Time Warner paid Wilco to make the album on Reprise, gave them the record for free, and then bought it back on the Nonesuch label. The album was released on April 23, 2002 to significant critical acclaim, including being named the best album of the year by The Village Voice. The album became the biggest hit of Jeff Tweedy's career and was certified gold by the Recording Industry Association of America for selling over 500,000 copies.

==== A Ghost Is Born ====
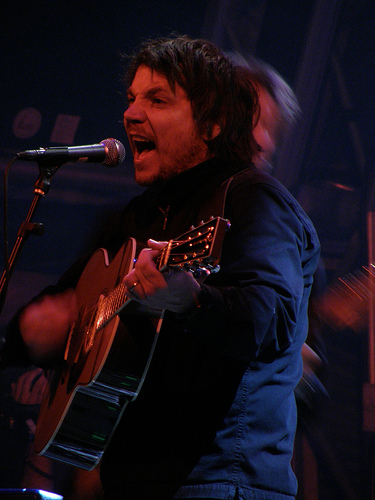
Tweedy in 2007

Scott McCaughey contacted Tweedy about recording an album together for a The Minus 5 release. They scheduled a meeting for September 11, 2001, but were reluctant to enter the recording studio after the terrorist attacks. At night, McCaughey and Tweedy decided to begin recording songs as a way to calm down. A few more tracks were later added to the album with the rest of Wilco, and it was released with the name Down with Wilco in 2003.

In November 2003, Wilco began recording a fifth studio album. Unlike their previous albums, all of the songs were originally performed in the studio and then later adapted for playing at concerts. Wilco released A Ghost Is Born on June 22, 2004, and it attained a top ten peak on the Billboard 200. The album was awarded with Grammy Awards for Best Alternative Music Album and Best Recording Package in 2005. A few weeks before the album's release, Tweedy released a book of forty-three poems entitled Adult Head on Zoo Press. The following year, the band released their first live album, a two-disc set entitled Kicking Television: Live in Chicago, recorded at The Vic Theater.

==== Later Wilco albums ====
Wilco recorded twelve tracks for a sixth studio album entitled Sky Blue Sky, which was released on May 15, 2007. Sky Blue Sky debuted at number four on the Billboard 200, the band's highest debut yet. It sold over 87,000 copies in its first week of release.

In early May 2009, former Wilco member Jay Bennett sued Tweedy for breach of contract. Bennett died later that month of an accidental overdose of the painkiller fentanyl. In June 2009 Wilco released their seventh studio album Wilco (The Album), followed by The Whole Love in 2011, Star Wars in 2015, Schmilco in 2016, Ode to Joy in 2019, Cruel Country in May 2022, and Cousin in 2023.

=== Other work ===
Jeff Tweedy has performed several solo tours, on which he typically plays acoustic music. He also recorded the song "Simple Twist of Fate" for the soundtrack to I'm Not There. On October 24, 2006, Nonesuch Records released Sunken Treasure: Live in the Pacific Northwest, a live DVD by Tweedy. The disc includes performances and conversations gathered over five nights on Tweedy's February 2006 solo acoustic tour, with footage from concerts at Seattle's Moore Theater, Portland's Crystal Ballroom, Eugene's McDonald Theatre, Arcata's Humboldt State University, and The Fillmore in San Francisco. The DVD was directed by Christoph Green and Fugazi's Brendan Canty, the creators of the documentary series Burn to Shine.

Tweedy has partnered with Mavis Staples on three acclaimed albums. In 2010 they released You Are Not Alone, in 2013, One True Vine, and in 2017 If All I Was Was Black. Tweedy played an array of instruments on these albums and wrote many of the songs.

Tweedy worked with the psychedelic-influenced garage rock group White Denim on their record Corsicana Lemonade, recording some songs at Wilco's Chicago studio The Loft. In 2015 the album Still by Richard Thompson was released. The album was produced by Tweedy in The Loft Studios and features Tweedy on guitar, keyboards and backing vocals.

Tweedy has appeared as a fictional singer-songwriter on 2014 episodes of Parks and Recreation and Portlandia.

On June 4, 2014, it was announced that he had formed a new band called Tweedy with his son Spencer. The band's debut album Sukierae was released on September 16. The release was followed by a world tour in which half of the set consisted of new songs off Sukierae performed by a touring band including Spencer. The latter half of the set Tweedy plays solo, typically performing Wilco and Uncle Tupelo classics.

In June 2017 Jeff Tweedy released a solo acoustic album of eleven songs spanning his career from Wilco, Loose Fur, and Golden Smog titled Together at Last. In November 2018 Jeff Tweedy released a memoir titled Let's Go (So We Can Get Back) and his first solo album of new material, titled Warm. A companion album to Warm titled Warmer was released on April 13, 2019, as a Record Store Day exclusive.

In 2020 during the COVID-19 pandemic Susan Tweedy and her family created a recurring video series on Instagram dubbed The Tweedy Show featuring Jeff and their sons performing original and cover songs. During the shelter-in-place Jeff Tweedy also wrote and recorded his third solo album titled Love Is the King which was announced to release on October 23, 2020 and wrote his second book titled How to Write One Song which was announced to release on October 13, 2020, on the E. P. Dutton publishing label. His third book, World Within a Song, was released in November 2023.

In September 2025, Tweedy released a triple-album of new solo material, Twilight Override. He wrote the album over a two year period and recorded the 30 tracks in collaboration with friends and both of his sons, Sammy and Spencer.

== Musical style ==
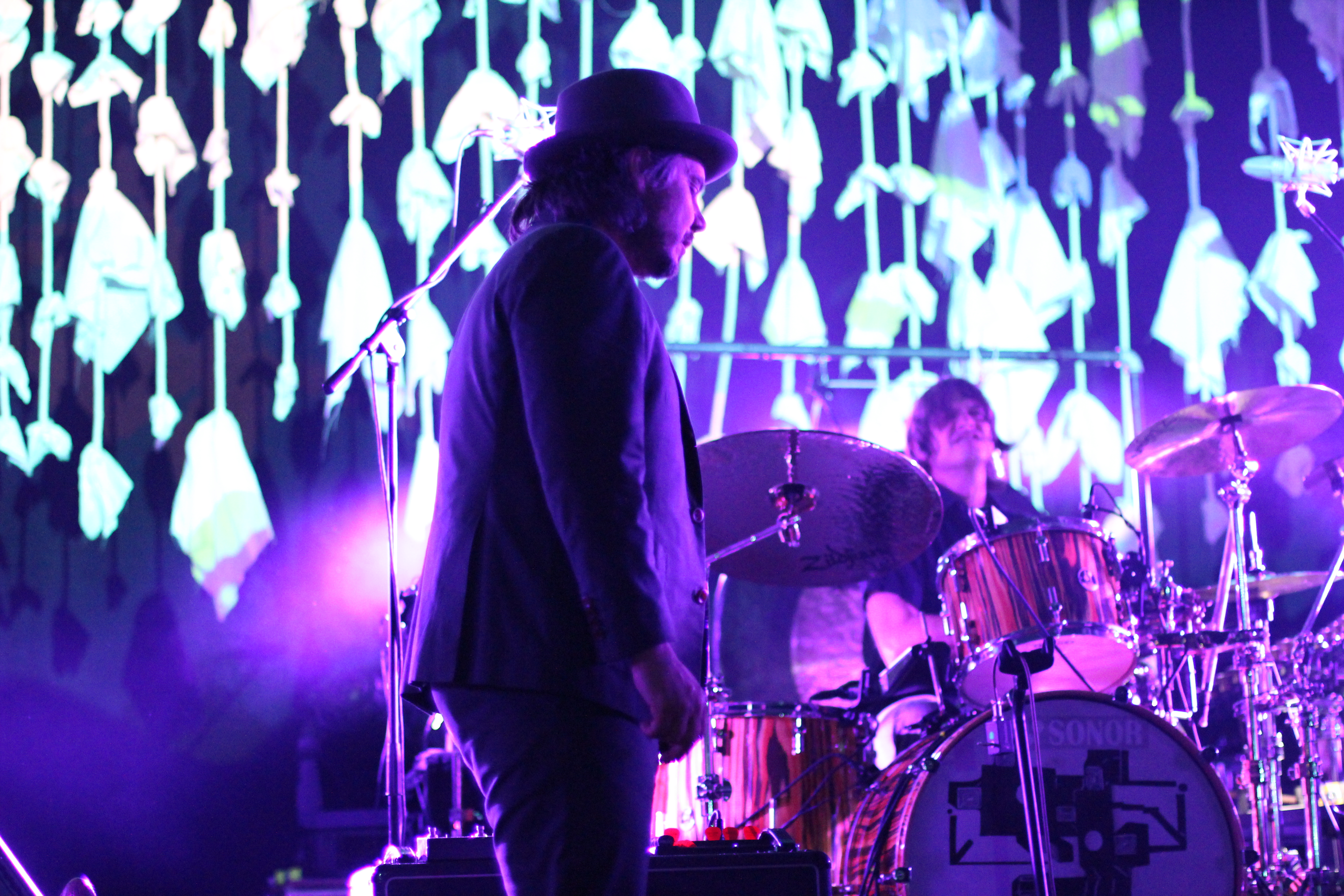
Jeff Tweedy and Glenn Kotche Wilco at Susquehanna Bank Center XPoNential Music Festival 2012

Tweedy's musical style has varied over his music career. Tweedy's vocal style is considered nasal, emotional, and raspy, and has been compared to that of Neil Young. His first exposure to music was through gramophone records that his siblings left behind when they attended college, and he particularly liked The Beatles' White Album. Tweedy would frequently read issues of magazines such as Rolling Stone, and began to purchase punk rock albums such as The Clash's London Calling and X's Wild Gift. Belleville crowds did not respond well to punk music, so while Tweedy was a member of The Primitives they played covers of country songs at much faster tempos. When Uncle Tupelo formed, the band began composing its own songs influenced by Jason & the Scorchers and The Minutemen. Wilco's first album shared many musical similarities with the four previous Uncle Tupelo albums, but on Being There, Tweedy began introducing more experimental themes into his music. He claims that he wanted to rebel against the belief spread by the No Depression magazine that Wilco was primarily a country band. One of the most influential albums for Tweedy was Bad Timing by Jim O'Rourke, which helped to inspire Yankee Hotel Foxtrot and A Ghost Is Born. Tweedy uses a 1957 Gibson J-45 acoustic guitar, as well as a 1965 Fender Jazzmaster, at least three different Telecasters, an Epiphone Casino, a Rickenbacker 360, and a Gibson SG Standard. He has vintage SGs from '62 and '65 as well as a 2007 Custom Shop model and a 2008 Custom Shop Vintage Original Spec (V.O.S.) that are all rigged with Maestro tremolo bars. He also has been known to use a Breedlove 000 and even designed a limited edition 000 for Breedlove in 2007. His amplifier of choice is a Vox AC30.

== Personal life ==
Tweedy has been prone to having migraines throughout his life; he has missed as many as forty days of elementary school in one year with the condition. While he attempted to regulate the use of painkillers, he was never able to stop using them for more than five weeks. He attributes that to a comorbidity with major depressive disorder and severe panic attacks. In 2004, he entered a dual diagnosis rehabilitation clinic in order to receive treatment for an addiction to prescription painkiller Vicodin. Tweedy quit smoking the next year, which John Stirratt claimed afterward significantly improved the focus of the band.

Tweedy is married to former bookkeeper Sue Miller and lives in the Irving Park area of Chicago. He first met Miller when he was trying to get Uncle Tupelo booked at Cubby Bear, where Miller worked. Miller later co-owned Lounge Ax, which booked Uncle Tupelo for 16 shows over four years. They began dating in 1991 and were married on August 9, 1995. She was diagnosed with cancer in 2014. During a 2015 interview with Rolling Stone, Tweedy said "she's doing great now." Tweedy also said that music is a healthy distraction in such difficult times.

Tweedy and Miller have two sons: Spencer and Sammy. Spencer has been involved in numerous musical projects including The Blisters, Tully Monster, and a project with his father, Tweedy. In 2008, Spencer joined Wilco on stage at Madison Square Garden to play drums on their song The Late Greats while opening for Neil Young. Both Spencer and Sammy feature on Tweedy's 2025 triple album Twilight Override, as well as in the live band for Tweedy's 2026 KEXP show.

Tweedy has converted to Judaism. His wife is Jewish; their sons both had Bar Mitzvah ceremonies. During the ceremony for his older son, Tweedy played an acoustic version of Bob Dylan's "Forever Young".

In November 2019 Tweedy's home in Irving Park was shot at least seven times in an attack described by his son as "not targeted". No injuries were reported.

== Selected discography ==
=== Solo ===
- Together at Last (2017)
- Warm (2018)
- Warmer (2019)
- Love Is the King (2020)
- Twilight Override (2025)

=== With Uncle Tupelo ===
- No Depression (1990)
- Still Feel Gone (1991)
- March 16–20, 1992 (1992)
- Anodyne (1993)

=== With Wilco ===
- A.M. (1995)
- Being There (1996)
- Summerteeth (1999)
- Yankee Hotel Foxtrot (2001)
- A Ghost Is Born (2004)
- Sky Blue Sky (2007)
- Wilco (The Album) (2009)
- The Whole Love (2011)
- Star Wars (2015)
- Schmilco (2016)
- Ode to Joy (2019)
- Cruel Country (2022)
- Cousin (2023)
- Hot Sun Cool Shroud (2024)

=== With Tweedy ===
- Sukierae (2014)

== Publications ==
- Tweedy, Jeff (2004). Adult Head: Poems (registration required). Lincoln, Neb.: Zoo Press. ISBN 978-1-932-02316-9. OCLC 54372673.
- Saunders, George (2017). Lincoln in the Bardo (audiobook edition). Narration: Jeff Tweedy. New York: Random House Audio. ASIN B01N1NU4K2. OCLC 971025602.
- Tweedy, Jeff (2018). Let's Go (So We Can Get Back): A Memoir of Recording and Discording with Wilco, Etc. New York: Dutton Books. ISBN 9781101985267. OCLC 1051778815. Autobiography.
- Tweedy, Jeff (2020). How to Write One Song. New York: Dutton Books. ISBN 0593183525. OCLC 1175678766.
- Tweedy, Jeff (2023). World Within a Song. New York: Penguin Random House. ISBN 9780593472521. OCLC 1370328036.

== See also ==
- I Am Trying to Break Your Heart: A Film About Wilco
- New Multitudes—A Woody Guthrie tribute album
