= Tweedy (band) =

American rock band

- Genres: Rock
- Years active: 2014–present
- Members: Jeff Tweedy; Spencer Tweedy

Tweedy is an American rock band composed of Jeff Tweedy, from the group Wilco, and his son, Spencer. The duo has released one album, Sukierae, in 2014.

The elder Tweedy had planned Sukierae to be a solo record, but kept Spencer involved after playing together on early sessions. The group's album name references Susie, Jeff's wife and Spencer's mother, who was diagnosed with cancer during the composition process.

When touring, as of 2014 the group included bassist Darin Gray, guitarist Jim Elkington, keyboardist-guitarist Liam Kazar (Cunningham), and sometimes singer Sima Cunningham (Liam's sister).

Spencer Tweedy had played drums with his father on a previous record, Mavis Staples' One True Vine, which Jeff Tweedy produced.

== Spencer Tweedy, beyond Tweedy ==
Spencer Tweedy, along with Dorian Gehring and Liam Kazar (both formerly of Marrow), Kazar's sister Sima Cunningham, and Sullivan Davis frequently join Andrew Sa's Cosmic Country Showcase band, in Chicago and Milwaukee, Wisconsin, as of 2021-2022.

== Discography ==
Title	Album details	Peak chart positions					
Title	Album details	US	BEL (Fl)	GER	NLD	SPA	UK
Sukierae	Released: September 23, 2014; Label: dBpm	21	43	65	47	46	67
