= Summerteeth =

Studio album by Wilco
- Released: March 9, 1999
- Recorded: August 1997– November 1998
- Studios: Pedernales Recording, Spicewood
- Genres: Alt-country; chamber pop; orchestral pop; pop rock; power pop; psychedelic pop
- Length: 60:04
- Label: Reprise
- Producer: Wilco

Wilco chronology
Mermaid Avenue (1998)	Summerteeth (1999)	Mermaid Avenue Vol. II (2000)

Singles from Summerteeth
- 1. "Can't Stand It" Released: April 5, 1999; 2. "A Shot in the Arm" Released: June 28, 1999

Summerteeth (stylized as summerteeth) is the third studio album by the American rock band Wilco (stylized as wilco), released on March 9, 1999, by Reprise Records. The album was heavily influenced lyrically by 20th century literature, as well as singer Jeff Tweedy's marital problems. Unlike previous albums, Summerteeth was heavily overdubbed in the studio with Pro Tools. Tweedy and Jay Bennett wrote most of the album in the studio, a contrast to the band's previous albums, which were often recorded live by the entire band with minimal overdubs.

The album was met with critical acclaim from numerous outlets, including AllMusic, the Chicago Tribune and The Village Voice. Summerteeth sold approximately 200,000 copies, a modest number compared to the sales of their previous album Being There (1996). Wilco agreed to remix "Can't Stand It" with David Kahne to cater to radio markets, but the single failed to attract substantial airplay.

== Background and production ==
Wilco released Being There in 1996 to a higher level of commercial success than its first album, A.M., selling 300,000 copies (nearly double the number of its first record). After the promotional tour to support Being There, Wilco began to record tracks for a third album. The initial Summerteeth recording sessions were in November 1997 at Willie Nelson's music studio in Spicewood, Texas. Lead singer Jeff Tweedy was particularly emotional during the sessions because he was upset that he was unable to spend time with his wife and son because of the constant touring schedule. As a result, the songs recorded then reflected an introspective view that was also influenced by literature that Tweedy was reading at the time. While touring, Tweedy would read books by Henry Miller, William H. Gass and John Fante. According to Tweedy:

I definitely wanted to get better at writing, and those things happened simultaneously with trying to read better. I would write tons of stuff in my head, and forget. Some songs on Being There, I don't think I ever wrote any lyrics down ... To fight that, I started writing words on paper and making up melodies to go with them. By writing things down, and putting more words into my head, it put more words in my mouth when I turned on the tape recorder to sing.

The sessions produced a number of songs, including "I'm Always in Love", "She's a Jar" and the Henry Miller-inspired murder ballad "Via Chicago". Tweedy's relationship with his wife Sue Miller became the inspiration for several of the songs, although she was portrayed mostly in a negative sense. Miller was reluctantly willing to give Tweedy the creative license to write songs, but was concerned about lyrics such as "she begs me not to hit her" from "She's a Jar".

Before the album was completed, Wilco decided to collaborate with Billy Bragg on the album that became Mermaid Avenue. Once the Mermaid Avenue sessions were completed, Wilco entered Chicago's Kingsize Soundlabs with engineers Dave Trumfio and Mike Hagler to finish Summerteeth. Tweedy and Bennett wanted to start the recording sessions again by experimenting with a new approach to mixing the songs. Unlike previous material, which was performed live in the studio, the pair heavily overdubbed many of the songs with Pro Tools. As a result, the contributions of other members were diminished. To complement the "bold, but depressing" lyrics, Tweedy relied more heavily on the production skills of the multi-instrumentalist Jay Bennett, who played a variety of instruments besides his usual lead guitar and keyboard work, including Mellotron, tambourine and synthesizers. Bennett even played the bass guitar and drums when the bass guitarist John Stirratt and drummer Ken Coomer were not in the studio. Coomer was not pleased about a reduced role in the band:

It was a circling of the wagons, and John and I felt left out. It was Jeff and Jay feeding off each other not just musically, but other vices. There was a bonding going on, and it didn't just involve music. Jeff didn't go into rehab [for an addiction to painkillers], but he should've, [sic] in my opinion. Jay was taking painkillers, antidepressants, and wasn't in much better shape. The band was different. There wasn't really a band, just two guys losing their minds in the studio.

After a series of personnel changes, Reprise Records sought to release a hit single from the album to increase album sales. Wilco agreed to do this "once and once only" on the basis that they wanted to cooperate with the label that allowed them such freedom. The band and Reprise executives agreed to re-mix "Can't Stand It" to make it more radio-friendly. Within one day, the song was remixed into the version that appeared on Summerteeth, cutting out portions of the bridge and adding bells. "Can't Stand It" failed to cross over from adult album alternative to modern rock radio stations.

== Reception ==
Professional ratings
Review scores
Source	Rating
AllMusic	5/5 stars
The Austin Chronicle	4.5/5 stars
Entertainment Weekly	A
The Guardian	5/5 stars
Houston Chronicle	4/5 stars
Pitchfork	9.4/10 (1999); 9.0/10 (2020)
Q	4/5 stars
Rolling Stone	3.5/5 stars
The Rolling Stone Album Guide	4/5 stars
Spin	7/10

Upon release, Summerteeth peaked at number 78 on the Billboard 200. It was their first album to chart in the top 40 in the United Kingdom. By 2003, it had sold over 200,000 copies. The album was placed eighth on the Pazz & Jop critics' poll for 1999, and Pitchfork gave it position 31 in its list of the best albums of the 1990s.

Jason Ankeny of AllMusic gave the album five stars, lauding its "lush string arrangements and gorgeous harmonies". Ankeny also compared the music on the album to The Band in their prime. Pitchfork writer Neil Lieberman praised how Wilco "craft[ed] an album as wonderfully ambiguous and beautifully uncertain as life itself" and how Bennett "paint[ed] the album in Technicolor". Robert Christgau gave the album a two-star honorable mention, calling it "old-fashioned tunecraft lacking not pedal steel, who cares, but the concreteness modern popcraft eschews". The Chicago Tribune critic Greg Kot championed the album in his review and ranked it the year's best album, calling it "pop so gorgeous it belies the intricate studio experimentation that brought it to life".

== Track listing ==
All lyrics are written by Jeff Tweedy; all music is composed by Tweedy with Jay Bennett, except where noted.

No.	Title	Writer(s)	Length
1.	"Can't Stand It"		3:46
2.	"She's a Jar"		4:43
3.	"A Shot in the Arm"	Bennett, John Stirratt, Tweedy	4:19
4.	"We're Just Friends"	Bennett, Stirratt, Tweedy	2:44
5.	"I'm Always in Love"		3:41
6.	"Nothing'severgonnastandinmyway (Again)"	Bennett, Stirratt, Tweedy	3:20
7.	"Pieholden Suite"		3:26
8.	"How to Fight Loneliness"		3:53
9.	"Via Chicago"	Tweedy	5:33
10.	"ELT"		3:46
11.	"My Darling"		3:38
12.	"When You Wake Up Feeling Old"	Tweedy	3:56
13.	"Summer Teeth"		3:21
14.	"In a Future Age"		2:57
15.	"23 Seconds of Silence" (hidden track)		0:23
16.	"Candyfloss" (hidden track)		2:58
17.	"A Shot in the Arm (Remix)" (hidden track)	Bennett, Stirratt, Tweedy	3:54
Total length:			60:41

Canadian promo bonus disc
No.	Title	Length
1.	"I Must Be High"	3:00
2.	"Pick Up the Change"	2:56
3.	"Passenger Side"	3:35
4.	"Monday" (Demo)	3:23
5.	"I Got You (At the End of the Century)"	3:58
6.	"Hotel Arizona"	3:38
7.	"Outtasite (Outta Mind)" (live)	2:29
8.	"Someone Else's Song"	3:22
9.	"Red Eyed and Blue" (live)	2:38
10.	"Box Full of Letters" (live)	3:05
11.	"Why Would You Wanna Live"	4:17
12.	"Forget the Flowers" (live)	3:00
13.	"The Lonely 1"	4:49
14.	"Sunken Treasure" (live)	7:12
15.	"At My Window Sad and Lonely"	3:28
16.	"Blasting Fonda"	4:17
Total length:		59:07

== Personnel ==
- Jeff Tweedy – vocals (1–14, 16), electric guitar (1, 9), backing vocals (1, 2, 10, 11), acoustic guitar (2, 3, 6–9, 11–14, 16), harmonica (2), 12-string guitar (3), synthesizers (3, 9), baritone guitar (5), claps (6), bass guitar (7), tambourine (7), toy harp (12), bowed and tremolo guitars (14)
- Jay Bennett – piano (1, 3–9, 11, 13, 14, 16), keyboards (1–3, 5–8, 10–13, 16), bells (1, 13), percussion (1), backing vocals (1, 2, 4–8, 10–14, 16), electric guitar (2, 10, 11, 13, 16), tambourine (2, 6, 7, 9–11), lap steel (3, 13), synthesizers (3, 7, 10), drums (3, 5, 17), Farfisa (4), bass drum (4), bass guitar (5), baritone guitar (6, 11, 16), e-bow guitar (6, 11), claps (11), banjo (7, 9), organ (9, 14, 16), Moog (9), slide bass (11), tiple (12), mellotron (1, 2, 11, 16), glockenspiel (7)
- John Stirratt – bass guitar (1–3, 6–14, 16), backing vocals (4–8, 11–13, 16), piano (5)
- Ken Coomer – drums (1, 2, 5–14, 16), timpani (3)
- Leroy Bach – piano (12)
- Dave Crawford – trumpet (7)
- Mark Greenberg – vibraphone (11)
- David Campbell — String arrangements (1)
- Mitch Easter, Chris Grainger, Larry Greenhill, Mike Hagler, Russ Long, David Trumfio – engineers
- David Kahne, Jim Scott – mixing
- Mike Scotella – mixing assistant
- Steve Chadie – assistant engineer
- Lawrence Azerrad – artwork, graphic design

== Charts ==
Chart performance for Summerteeth
Chart (1999)	Peak position
Australian Albums (ARIA)	62
Norwegian Albums (VG-lista)	5
Swedish Albums (Sverigetopplistan)	51
UK Albums (Official Charts)	38
US Billboard 200	78

== Appearances in media ==
- "How to Fight Loneliness" can be heard at the end of "Something Old" episode of How I Met Your Mother and was included in the soundtrack of the movie Girl, Interrupted (1999), at the end of "You Must Remember This" episode of House (Season 7 episode 12), and at the end of "Blackout" episode of ER (TV series).
- "My Darling" was included in season 1, episode 4 "The Deer Hunters" of "Gilmore Girls" (2000).
- "Summerteeth" is mentioned as a minor plot-element in Jo Nesbø's novel Phantom (2012)
- "She's a Jar" was featured in the movie The Darwin Awards (2006).
- “Via Chicago” was featured in Hulu TV series The Bear (TV series).
