= Mikael Jorgensen =

American musician, born 1972

Background information
- Born: June 4, 1972 (age 52)
- Occupation: Musician
- Instrument: Keyboards
- Years active: 2002-present

Signature
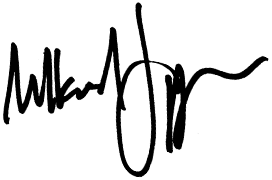

Mikael Jorgensen (born June 4, 1972) is an American musician known as the pianist and keyboardist for the band Wilco as well as a member of the bands Pronto and Quindar.

== Career ==
Prior to his days in Chicago and with Wilco, Mikael honed his musical skills in New Brunswick, New Jersey, developing his production skills, collaborating with local musicians and DJing.

In 1999, he released the album "Western Hamlet" with the group Movere Workshop.

Jorgensen, an ex-Chicago-based engineer and now full-time musician initially came aboard Wilco in 2002 to perform real-time sound manipulations on the Yankee Hotel Foxtrot tour, sitting just off stage left. As the tour rolled on, Jorgensen gradually moved onto the stage itself, manning his laptop as well as taking on more and more keyboard duties.

"It became apparent that Mike was a very proficient piano player that could do a lot more than we were using him for," says Wilco singer/songwriter Jeff Tweedy. "At that point, he started becoming a full-fledged member of the band, contributing parts to the new songs and even handling more of the nuts-and-bolts architecture of the older songs."

He first appeared on Wilco's 2004 release, A Ghost Is Born. On that album, he received songwriting credit for "Hell is Chrome" and "Theologians".

== Personal life ==
Jorgensen's father was born in Denmark but moved to the United States in the 1950s, and his mother was born in Hedmark, Norway. He has earned a degree at DeVry University in North Brunswick, New Jersey. He lives in Ojai, California.
