= John Stirratt =

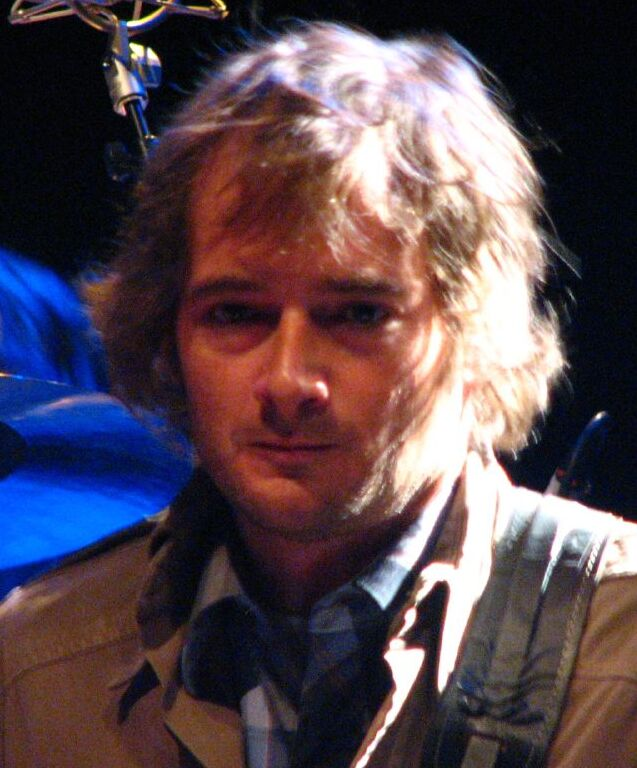
- Stirratt in 2007

Background information
- Born: John Chadwick Stiratt; November 26, 1967 (age 58)
- Genres: Alternative rock, alt.country, folk-rock, indie pop, indie rock
- Occupations: Musician, songwriter, producer
- Instruments: Bass, guitar, piano, keyboards, synthesiser, banjo, violin
- Years active: 1989–present
- Labels: Sire Records, Reprise Records, Nonesuch Records, Broadmoor Records, Yep Roc Records

Signature
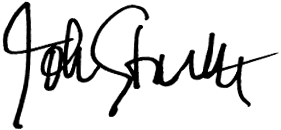

John Chadwick Stirratt is an American bassist and multi-instrumentalist for Wilco and The Autumn Defense.

== Early career ==
Stirratt grew up in Mandeville, Louisiana. He attended Mandeville High School and the University of Mississippi, and is a member of Phi Kappa Tau fraternity.

He played regularly around the American South with The Hilltops, a band based in Oxford, Mississippi which included his twin sister Laurie Stirratt and her husband Cary Hudson. During that time he met and befriended the band Uncle Tupelo supporting them on tours of the East and Midwest.

After the breakup of The Hilltops in 1990 Stirratt recorded a record under the name The Gimmecaps and briefly joined The Bluerunners, a Lafayette, Louisiana band, before joining Uncle Tupelo in 1992 as bassist/guitarist on their last album Anodyne.

== Wilco and The Autumn Defense ==
Stirratt discussing making Sky Blue Sky in 2007

After the breakup of Uncle Tupelo, Stirratt rejoined Jeff Tweedy, Ken Coomer, and Max Johnston to found Wilco in 1994. Since Wilco began, Stirratt and Tweedy are the only members to contribute to all Wilco releases.

Stirratt also joined Wilco members Jay Bennett and Ken Coomer forming Courtesy Move, an early Wilco side project which recorded an album in late 1996 that was never released. Stirratt formed The Autumn Defense in 2000 with friend and fellow New Orleanian Pat Sansone.
