= Anodyne (album) =

Studio album by Uncle Tupelo
- Released: October 5, 1993
- Recorded: May–June 1993
- Studios: Cedar Creek, Austin, Texas
- Genres: Alternative country; country rock
- Length: 43:17
- Label: Sire
- Producer: Brian Paulson

Uncle Tupelo chronology
March 16–20, 1992 (1992)	Anodyne (1993)

Anodyne is the fourth and final studio album by alternative country band Uncle Tupelo, released on October 5, 1993. The recording of the album was preceded by the departure of the original drummer Mike Heidorn and the addition of three new band members: bassist John Stirratt, drummer Ken Coomer, and multi-instrumentalist Max Johnston. The band signed with Sire Records shortly before recording the album; Anodyne was Uncle Tupelo's only major label release until 89/93: An Anthology in 2002.

Recorded in Austin, Texas, Anodyne featured a split in songwriting credits between singers Jay Farrar and Jeff Tweedy, plus a cover version of the Doug Sahm song "Give Back the Key to My Heart", with Sahm on vocals. The lyrical themes were influenced by country music and—more than their preceding releases—touched on interpersonal relationships. After two promotional tours for the album, tensions between Farrar and Tweedy culminated in the breakup of Uncle Tupelo. Well-received upon its initial release, Anodyne was re-mastered and re-released in 2003 by Rhino Entertainment including five bonus tracks.

== Background ==
Uncle Tupelo's third album, March 16–20, 1992, was released through Rockville Records on August 3, 1992. On the release, the band eschewed the growing popularity of alternative rock by playing acoustic folk and country songs "as a big 'fuck you' to the rock scene". Drummer Mike Heidorn had a reduced role on the album; because it was an acoustic album, Heidorn added only brush-stroke percussion on a few songs. Heidorn wanted to leave the band to spend more time with his wife and two young children. Though band manager Tony Margherita announced that several major labels were interested in signing Uncle Tupelo, Heidorn decided to permanently leave the band.

Rockville Records refused to pay Uncle Tupelo any royalties, even though the band's first two albums, No Depression and Still Feel Gone, sold a combined 40,000 copies. Consequently, Margherita was trying to find a new recording deal for the band. On a recommendation by singer Gary Louris of The Jayhawks, talent scout Joe McEwen pursued the band for a contract with Sire Records. McEwen was impressed by how the band was willing to go against trends, calling the band "an alternative to the alternative". Executing an out-clause in their contract with Rockville, Uncle Tupelo signed a seven-record deal with Sire in 1992. The deal guaranteed the release of at least two albums, with a $150,000 budget for the first.

Before releasing their first album with Sire, Uncle Tupelo needed a drummer. Farrar and Tweedy interviewed twenty-four candidates and were both impressed with Ken Coomer and Bill Belzer. Belzer was chosen and Uncle Tupelo embarked on the European segment of the promotional tour for March 16–20, 1992 as the opening act for Sugar. Belzer was dismissed from the band after six months, and Coomer was hired as his permanent replacement. Coomer was not the only new member added after the tour—Uncle Tupelo sought to expand beyond a trio for the Anodyne recording sessions. They recruited multi-instrumentalist Max Johnston and bassist John Stirratt—Stirratt's presence enabled Tweedy to become a full-time guitarist on the songs that he wrote.

== Recording ==
Anodyne was recorded from May to June 1993 at Cedar Creek studio in Austin, Texas. Uncle Tupelo liked the studio because it "just seemed really kind of homey and small and cheap". The album was produced, mixed, and engineered by Brian Paulson. The now-expanded lineup inspired Tweedy to spend more time with his bandmates. After Tweedy wrote each song, he would play it to Stirratt, Coomer, and Johnston to get their opinions. Farrar interpreted these practice sessions as a sign of Tweedy's increasing arrogance. At live shows, during this time, tensions between Tweedy and Farrar increased and led to verbal altercations.

The album was recorded live in the studio, and each song was recorded in only one take. As a result, the recording sessions for Anodyne were completed in two weeks. Anodyne was the only Uncle Tupelo album to completely lack overdubbing. Sire was pleased with the album; according to McEwen, "everybody [at the label] considered it a step up from what they'd done before." Farrar wrote six of the songs on the album and Tweedy wrote five, though all the new material was credited to both songwriters. While on tour, Uncle Tupelo met Texas Tornados singer Doug Sahm at the Hotel Phoenix in Boston, Massachusetts. Farrar invited him to join the band in the studio for a cover of Sahm's "Give Back the Key to My Heart", which Sahm contributed lead vocals to.

The lyrical content of Anodyne was influenced by 1950s and 1960s country music, particularly Ernest Tubb, Buck Owens, and Lefty Frizzell. Tweedy included several songs referencing aspects of the music industry. One example was "Acuff-Rose", a paean on the music publishers of Acuff-Rose Music. He also wrote "We've Been Had", which was intended to chastise bands such as Nirvana and The Clash who were "all just show biz" in his opinion. Tweedy was also the author of "New Madrid", a song about Iben Browning's erroneous prediction of an apocalyptic earthquake in New Madrid, Missouri. Farrar was less comfortable discussing the lyrics that he wrote, claiming that his songs frequently change their meanings. Like other Uncle Tupelo albums, Farrar and Tweedy wrote their own lyrics, and played them for each other a week before the recording sessions. In comparison to the rest of the Uncle Tupelo catalog, Coomer described the music of the album as "some of [the band's] earlier crunch with the acoustic subtlety of March 16–20, 1992".

== Music ==
Considered a country rock album, Anodyne also incorporates elements of traditional country, rock music and folk music. According to Jack Johnson of Paste Magazine, "the Appalachian folk and grungy punk roots are both evident" on the album. Vocal duties are traded off between Tweedy and Farrar.

== Promotion and reception ==
Professional ratings
Review scores
Source	Rating
AllMusic	4.5/5 stars
Chicago Tribune	3/4 stars
Encyclopedia of Popular Music	4/5 stars
NME	9/10
Q	3/5 stars
Rolling Stone	4/5 stars
The Rolling Stone Album Guide	4/5 stars
Uncut	4/5 stars

Anodyne was Uncle Tupelo's only recording to appear on the American Billboard Heatseekers chart. Despite the lack of a single to promote the album, sales eventually surpassed 150,000 copies. A promotional tour for the album began later that year, including a sold-out show at Tramps in New York City. Most shows on the tour sold over one thousand tickets. The success of the tour encouraged the label; according to Sire executive Bill Bentley, "people here thought we were going to have platinum records from Uncle Tupelo."

Despite the label's aspirations, Jay Farrar announced his intention to leave Uncle Tupelo in January 1994. Farrar kept his reasoning secret until fall 1995, when he claimed in an interview that "it reached a point where Jeff and I really weren't compatible." As a sign of loyalty to band manager Tony Margherita, who had acquired a $3000 debt on behalf of the band, Farrar agreed to do another promotional tour. Physical altercations between Tweedy and Farrar began two weeks into the tour and continued throughout—many were due to Farrar's refusal to play on Tweedy's songs. Despite Farrar's reservations, Uncle Tupelo performed Tweedy's "The Long Cut" on Late Night with Conan O'Brien, the band's only network television appearance. The band played their final concert on May 1, 1994, at Mississippi Nights in St. Louis, Missouri. The remaining members of the Anodyne sessions formed Wilco a few weeks later.

The band re-mastered and re-released the album on March 11, 2003, through Rhino Records. The new version included two previously unreleased songs: Farrar's "Stay True", Tweedy's "Wherever". It also included a cover of Waylon Jennings' "Are You Sure Hank Done It This Way?", with vocals by Joe Ely, a song previously released on the 1993 compilation Trademark of Quality. Live cover versions of "Truck Drivin' Man" and "Suzy Q" were also included on the re-issue.

Anodyne was well received by critics domestically and internationally. AllMusic writer Jason Ankeny wrote, "Uncle Tupelo never struck a finer balance between rock and country than on Anodyne". Mark Kemp wrote for Rolling Stone that the band "[has] an intuitive sense of the simplicity and dynamics of a country song." German music periodical Spex compared the album to Neil Young and to Little Feat's debut album. CMJ's Jim Caligiuri praised Anodyne as "another austere, inspired collection". Karen Schoemer of The New York Times found that the album "is certainly derivative, but Uncle Tupelo isn't seeking to reinvent its sources, merely to honor them". At the end of the year, Anodyne placed at number twenty-eight on The Village Voice's Pazz & Jop critics' poll and at number nineteen on the Spex critics' poll. Greg Kot praised Max Johnston's contributions in the 2004 book The New Rolling Stone Album Guide and called the album "Tupelo's finest effort." Norwegian newspaper Dagbladet listed Anodyne in 1999 as one of "The Best Albums of the Century". In 2008, Rolling Stone critic Tom Moon listed Anodyne among the 1,000 Recordings to Hear Before You Die.

Although the majority of the album's reviews were positive, some critics disagreed. Q's reviewer gave the album three stars out of five and noted that the band needed to "shed some of the Neil Young obsession." Tom Moon of Rolling Stone gave the 2003 re-release all five stars, but commented that the bonus tracks there were "pleasant but inconsequential." Robert Christgau perceived the album as neither a "dud" nor worthy of "honorable mention".

In 2016, Paste ranked Anodyne at number one in its list of "The 50 Best Alt-Country Albums".

== Track listing ==
Songwriting credits from the 2003 reissue.

1. "Slate" (Farrar) – 3:24
2. "Acuff-Rose" (Tweedy) – 2:35
3. "The Long Cut" (Tweedy) – 3:20
4. "Give Back the Key to My Heart" (Doug Sahm) – 3:26
5. "Chickamauga" (Farrar) – 3:42
6. "New Madrid" (Tweedy) – 3:31
7. "Anodyne" (Farrar) – 4:50
8. "We've Been Had" (Tweedy) – 3:26
9. "Fifteen Keys" (Farrar) – 3:25
10. "High Water" (Farrar) – 4:14
11. "No Sense in Lovin'" (Tweedy) – 3:46
12. "Steal the Crumbs" (Farrar) – 3:38

=== 2003 CD reissue bonus tracks ===
13. "Stay True"* (Farrar) – 3:29
14. "Wherever"* (Tweedy) – 3:38
15. "Are You Sure Hank Done It This Way"* (Jennings) – 3:01
16. "Truck Drivin' Man (Live)" (Fell) – 2:13
17. "Suzy Q (Live)" (Hawkins/Lewis/Broadwater) – 7:13

*Tracks 13–15 previously unreleased studio outtakes.

== Personnel ==
Uncle Tupelo

- Jay Farrar – vocal (1, 4, 5, 7, 9, 10, 12, 13, 15–17), guitar (1, 3–17), mandolin (2), backing vocal (8)
- Jeff Tweedy – vocal (2, 3, 6, 8, 11, 14), bass guitar (1, 7, 9, 10, 12–17), guitar (2, 4, 6, 11), rhythm guitar (3, 5, 8), backing vocal (4, 5, 16)
- Max Johnston – fiddle (1, 2, 4, 12, 14, 16), lap steel guitar (3, 7, 8), banjo (6), Dobro (9)
- John Stirratt – bass guitar (3–6, 8, 11), guitar (7, 9)
- Ken Coomer – drums (1, 3–17)

Additional musicians

- Doug Sahm – guitar, vocal (4)
- Lloyd Maines – pedal steel guitar (7, 10, 11)
- Joe Ely – vocals, guitar (15)
- Brian Henneman – guitar (16, 17)

Technical personnel

- Dave C. Birke – graphic design, art direction
- Dan Corrigan – photography
- Scott Hull – mastering
- Brian Paulson – production, engineering, mixing
