= A.M. (Wilco album) =

Studio album by Wilco
- Released: March 28, 1995
- Recorded: June–August 1994
- Studio: Easley-McCain (Memphis)
- Genres: Alt-country; country rock
- Length: 44:33
- Labels: Sire; Reprise
- Producers: Brian Paulson; Wilco

Wilco chronology
A.M. (1995)	Being There (1996)

Singles from A.M.
- 1. "Box Full of Letters" Released: 1995

A.M. is the debut studio album by the American rock band Wilco, released on March 28, 1995, by Sire Records and Reprise Records. The album was released only months after the breakup of Uncle Tupelo, an alternative country band that was the predecessor of Wilco. Prior to its release, there was debate about whether the album would be better than the debut album of Son Volt, the new band of former Uncle Tupelo lead singer Jay Farrar.

Although A.M. was released before Son Volt's Trace, critical reviews were modest and initial sales were low. The album was later regarded as a "failure" by band members, as Trace was a greater success. It was the band's last album to be recorded in a purely alternative country style, as following the record the band began to expand their sound across multiple genres. It is also the only Wilco album to feature Brian Henneman of The Bottle Rockets as a lead guitarist.

== Background and recording ==
"I Must Be High"
Sample from "I Must Be High", the first track from A.M.

Uncle Tupelo's final album, Anodyne, featured a new lineup for the band—a five-piece outfit with drummer Ken Coomer, bassist John Stirratt, and multi-instrumentalist Max Johnston. Tensions mounted between singers Jay Farrar and Jeff Tweedy, and Uncle Tupelo played its last concert on May 1, 1994, at Mississippi Nights in St. Louis, Missouri.

Only days after the breakup, Tweedy decided to form a new group. He was able to retain the lineup of Uncle Tupelo sans Farrar, and rechristened the band Wilco. In mid-May, the band began to rehearse songs in the office of band manager Tony Margherita, and hired producer Brian Paulson, who produced Anodyne. Wilco first recorded demo tracks for the album at Easley McCain Recording in Memphis, Tennessee, in June. Stirratt recommended the studio based on previous experience as a member of The Hilltops, and Tweedy had heard of the studio through a Jon Spencer Blues Explosion recording. Reprise Records, a subsidiary of Warner Bros, signed Jeff Tweedy after hearing the tapes, and recording for the album continued through August.

Tweedy was preoccupied with trying to establish Wilco as a viable band on the Reprise label, and decided to add another guitarist to the band. Brian Henneman, the lead singer for The Bottle Rockets, was brought into the recording sessions as a lead guitarist. Steel guitarist Lloyd Maines and bassist Daniel Corrigan also contributed to the album. Corrigan also photographed the band for the liner booklet. Howie Weinberg mastered the album, while Barbara Longo provided graphic design. Henneman had to leave the band shortly after recording the album, and was replaced by former Titanic Love Affair guitarist Jay Bennett. Tweedy also attempted to create a more collaborative environment than Uncle Tupelo, requesting songwriting contributions from other members. Stirratt submitted three songs, hoping to become a secondary songwriter for Wilco. However, although the songs were recorded as demos, only one ("It's Just That Simple") was selected to appear on the album, and was the only Stirratt song, and the only song by Wilco not to have lyrics written by Tweedy, to appear on any Wilco album.

The album's title is intended to reference Top 40 radio stations, and the tracks reflect a straightforward country-rock sound. The band members felt that they needed to establish themselves outside of the Uncle Tupelo fanbase. However, Tweedy later stated that in actuality, they were "trying to tread some water with a perceived audience." Tweedy wrote a song about the Uncle Tupelo breakup, but decided that he didn't want any material on that subject to appear on the album. (It can be argued, however, that first single "Box Full of Letters", as well as "Too Far Apart" allude to the dissolution of Farrar and Tweedy's friendship and working relationship.) Critic and author Greg Kot wrote in Wilco: Learning How to Die that "Tweedy's voice and personality are as modest as the arrangements; there's little sense of drama, and virtually no hint of risk." Tweedy attributes some of the straightforwardness of the album to his abuse of marijuana at the time. Shortly after the album, Tweedy stopped smoking pot, to which he credits the introspectiveness of further albums.

While Wilco was recording tracks, Farrar formed a band of his own, Son Volt. Son Volt signed to Warner Bros. Records and began recording their first album (also produced by Paulson), Trace, in November 1994. The fact that both Wilco and Son Volt began working on an album almost immediately after the Uncle Tupelo breakup caused debate among critics, fans, and Warner Bros. about which would be the better band. Joe McEwen, who originally signed Uncle Tupelo to a Warner subsidiary, felt that Wilco was taking a step backwards from the material on Anodyne. McEwen urged Richard Dodd, who had recently mixed Tom Petty's Wildflowers, to remix the album. Dodd emphasized Tweedy's vocals to increase the chances of success on radio.

Wilco began touring before the album was released. Their live debut was on November 27, 1994, at Cicero's Basement Bar in St. Louis, a venue where Uncle Tupelo had first received significant media attention. The band was billed for that concert as Black Shampoo, a reference to a 1970s B movie, and the show sold out. Wilco continued to tour for two hundred shows, culminating in a show at the South by Southwest Music Conference in Austin, Texas, in March 1995. A.M. was released on Reprise Records on March 28, 1995.

== Commercial and critical reception ==
Professional ratings
Review scores
Source	Rating
AllMusic	3.5/5 stars
Chicago Tribune	3.5/4 stars
Entertainment Weekly	B+
Los Angeles Times	3/4 stars
The Philadelphia Inquirer	4/4 stars
Pitchfork	7.0/10
Record Collector	3/5 stars
Rolling Stone	3.5/5 stars
The Rolling Stone Album Guide	3.5/5 stars
Uncut	7/10

A.M. received modest reviews from critics. Holly George-Warren of Rolling Stone called the album "one hell of a country-guts debut", praising the influence of Gram Parsons and Neil Young on the music. However, the album still received a moderate three-and-a-half star rating. Robert Christgau of The Village Voice gave the album a three-star honorable mention, but called it "realist defiance grinding sadly down into realist bathos." The Village Voice placed the album at position 34 on the 1995 Pazz & Jop critics poll. The band was disappointed by the critical reception, since Trace was met with better reviews. According to Henneman:

The first Son Volt record was pretty fucking good. It was like watching a prize fight at that point. Wow! He slammed him there! Ouch! What a counterpunch! It was exciting being on the sidelines watching these guys. It's like Jay had something to prove with that first album, an urgency to it that none of his albums since have had. I felt he had a chip on his shoulder, and it shows up in the music. It was stunning. It was humbling. I think that kicked Jeff in the ass.

A.M. hit number 27 on Billboard's Top Heatseekers chart, whereas Trace peaked at number 166 on the Billboard 200; by 1997, Trace had outsold A.M. two-to-one. Wilco released "Box Full of Letters" as a single, but it received little airplay. For the only time in Wilco's career, ticket sales failed to meet expectations. As of 2003, the album had sold about 150,000 copies.

== Track listing ==
All songs written by Jeff Tweedy unless otherwise noted.

1. "I Must Be High" – 2:59
2. "Casino Queen" – 2:45
3. "Box Full of Letters" – 3:05
4. "Shouldn't Be Ashamed" – 3:28
5. "Pick Up the Change" – 2:56
6. "I Thought I Held You" – 3:49
7. "That's Not the Issue" – 3:19
8. "It's Just That Simple" (John Stirratt) – 3:45
9. "Should've Been in Love" – 3:36
10. "Passenger Side" – 3:33
11. "Dash 7" – 3:29
12. "Blue Eyed Soul" – 4:05
13. "Too Far Apart" – 3:44

== Personnel ==
- Jeff Tweedy – vocals (1–7, 9–13), guitar (1, 3, 13), acoustic guitar (2, 4–7, 9–12), bass (8)
- John Stirratt – bass (1–7, 9, 10, 12, 13), vocals (2, 3, 6, 8), piano (6), acoustic guitar (8), lead vocals (8), organ (13)
- Ken Coomer – drums (1–10, 12, 13), vocals (2)
- Max Johnston – dobro (1, 3, 9, 13), fiddle (2, 10), vocals (2), mandolin (4, 8, 10, 12), banjo (5–7)
- Brian Henneman – guitar (1–9, 12, 13), vocals (2), small stoned guitar (10)
- Daniel Corrigan – vocals (2)
- Lloyd Maines – pedal steel guitar (1, 6, 8, 11, 12)
- Wilco, Brian Henneman and Daniel Corrigan – handclaps, crowd noise, glass cheers (2)

=== Production ===
- Daniel Corrigan – photography
- Richard Dodd – mixing
- Barbara Longo – design
- Brian Paulson – producer, engineer, mixing
- Howie Weinberg – mastering
- Wilco – producer, engineer
- Bob Andrews – production coordinator
