= No Depression =

No Depression may refer to:

- No Depression (magazine), a roots music website and quarterly print journal (2015-present). Formerly a bi-monthly roots music magazine (published 1995–2008).
- "No Depression in Heaven", a 1936 song popularized by the Carter Family
- No Depression (album), a 1990 album by the alternative country band Uncle Tupelo

== See also ==
- "No Depression in New Zealand", a 1981 song by Blam Blam Blam
