= 89/93: An Anthology =

Compilation album by Uncle Tupelo
- Released: March 19, 2002
- Recorded: 1989–1993
- Genre: Alternative country
- Label: Legacy
- Producers: Jay Farrar, Jeff Tweedy

Professional ratings
Review scores
Source	Rating
AllMusic	4.5/5 stars
The Austin Chronicle	4/5 stars
The A.V. Club	(favorable)
Entertainment Weekly	A−
NME	(8/10)
No Depression	(favorable)
Pitchfork Media	(7.8/10)
PopMatters	(positive)
Q	4/5 stars
Rolling Stone	3/5 stars
The Rolling Stone Album Guide	3/5 stars
Spin	(favorable)
Stylus Magazine	A

89/93: An Anthology is a retrospective compilation album by American alternative country band Uncle Tupelo, released in 2002 by Legacy Recordings.

The compilation contains mostly original songs from Uncle Tupelo's four studio albums. "Outdone" is a demo version of the song released on No Depression. "I Wanna Be Your Dog" was previously unreleased. "Looking for a Way Out" is an acoustic version of the track released on Still Feel Gone. "Effigy", a Creedence Clearwater Revival cover, was originally released on the 1993 compilation album No Alternative.

== Track listing ==
1. "No Depression" – (A.P. Carter)
2. "Screen Door" – (Farrar, Tweedy, Heidorn)
3. "Graveyard Shift" – (Farrar, Tweedy, Heidorn)
4. "Whiskey Bottle" – (Farrar, Tweedy, Heidorn)
5. "Outdone" (1989 Demo)* – (Farrar, Tweedy, Heidorn)
6. "I Got Drunk" – (Farrar, Tweedy, Heidorn)
7. "I Wanna Be Your Dog"*– (The Stooges)
8. "Gun" – (Farrar, Tweedy, Heidorn)
9. "Still Be Around" – (Farrar, Tweedy, Heidorn)
10. "Looking for a Way Out" (Acoustic Version)* – (Farrar, Tweedy, Heidorn)
11. "Watch Me Fall" – (Farrar, Tweedy, Heidorn)
12. "Sauget Wind" – (Farrar, Tweedy, Heidorn)
13. "Black Eye" – (Farrar, Tweedy)
14. "Moonshiner" – (traditional, arranged by Farrar, Tweedy)
15. "Fatal Wound" – (Farrar, Tweedy)
16. "Grindstone" – (Farrar, Tweedy)
17. "Effigy" – (Fogerty)
18. "The Long Cut" – (Farrar, Tweedy)
19. "Chickamauga" – (Farrar, Tweedy)
20. "New Madrid" – (Farrar, Tweedy)
21. "We've Been Had" (Live) – (Farrar, Tweedy)

*Previously Unreleased
