= Being There (Wilco album) =

Studio album by Wilco
- Released: October 29, 1996
- Recorded: September 1995 – July 1996
- Studios: CRC (Chicago); Warzone Recorders (Chicago); The Studio (Springfield); Moonshine (Atlanta, Georgia)
- Genres: Alt-country; country rock
- Length: 76:47
- Label: Reprise
- Producer: Wilco

Wilco chronology
A.M. (1995)	Being There (1996)	Mermaid Avenue (1998)

Singles from Being There
- 1. "Outtasite (Outta Mind)" Released: April 7, 1997; 2. "Monday" Released: 1997

Being There is the second studio album by the American rock band Wilco, released on October 29, 1996, by Reprise Records. Despite its release as a double album, Being There was sold at a single album price as a result of a deal between lead singer Jeff Tweedy and the band's label Reprise Records. Compared to their debut album A.M. (1995), the album was an improvement for the band in both sales and critical reception. Taking its name from the 1979 film of the same name, the self-produced album featured more surrealistic and introspective writing than on A.M. This was due in part to several significant changes in Tweedy's life, including the birth of his first child. Musically, it juxtaposed the alternative country styles songs reminiscent of Uncle Tupelo with psychedelic, surreal songs. It was the only Wilco album with steel guitarist Bob Egan, their first with multi-instrumentalist Jay Bennett and their last with multi-instrumentalist Max Johnston.

== Background ==
Jeff Tweedy formed Wilco in 1994 after creative differences between Jay Farrar and Tweedy caused the breakup of Uncle Tupelo. The band entered the recording studio almost immediately afterwards to record and release A.M. in 1995, which saw disappointing sales. Jay Farrar's new band Son Volt released Trace in late 1995 to critical praise and good sales numbers. Trace also provided a college rock hit song in "Drown", which entered the top ten of the Billboard Mainstream Rock Tracks chart, further increasing competition between the two bands.

Tweedy felt that Wilco was incomplete without a second guitarist due to the departure of Brian Henneman after the A.M. recording sessions. Wilco's road manager Bob Andrews helped Tweedy get in contact with Jay Bennett, a multi-instrumentalist who had been looking for a new band to join since his power pop band Titanic Love Affair had been dismissed from its record label. Bennett joined Wilco after Tweedy sent him a few Uncle Tupelo songs and a copy of A.M.; Tweedy had been intrigued by the fact that Bennett could play keyboards, an instrument no other Wilco member played.

== Production ==
The first conceptions of material for the album came during a particularly stressful time in Tweedy's life. Tweedy had recently quit smoking marijuana, attendance at Wilco concerts was dwindling, and Tweedy was trying to manage his marriage, a mortgage, and the birth of his first child. He responded to these pressures:

I was a later bloomer. I was in my thirties before I even came to terms with the idea that I was making a living as a recording artist. I was in a punk band for a long time and thought it was my life. I was a bass player in a band making fifty dollars a night, paying eighty dollars a month in rent, making indie records and not getting paid for them, and having this naive sense of well-being that I would always do this and never have much more responsibility than that. I went from that to being a dad and a major-label recording artist who had the pressure of supporting a family and also making something I felt good about artistically.

For Being There, Tweedy wanted to blend the experiences he had making music with the ones he had listening to music. One of the first songs that Tweedy wrote was "Misunderstood", a song about a tortured musical artist from the point of view of a fan. The song contains several overt references to the breakup of Uncle Tupelo, including the addition of insults that Farrar used against Tweedy—specifically one calling him a "mama's boy". Part of the song's lyrics ("Take the guitar player for a ride/See, he ain't never been satisfied/He thinks he owes some kind of debt/Be years before he gets over it") are originally from Peter Laughner, an underground alternative rock artist from Cleveland that died at 24 in 1977, taken from his song "Amphetamine". The song concludes with the artist lashing out against the listener with satirical self-pity, a rebellion against the way that fans saw Uncle Tupelo as only an archetype of Gram Parsons inspired country rock. To induce a feeling of chaos on the track, the members of Wilco recorded a track where the members switched to novel instruments and placed sections of it into the song. The theme of a "tortured artist" is found in other songs as well; the end of "Sunken Treasure" features Tweedy calling for the renewal of his youth as a punk rocker.

A dichotomy of musical styling was featured in the album's songs. "Hotel Arizona", "Sunken Treasure", and "Misunderstood" featured personal language and more surrealism compared to alternative country songs such as "The Lonely 1" and "Far, Far Away". To enhance this dichotomy between simple and surreal, each song was practiced, recorded, and mixed in only one day. The album's name was taken from the 1979 comedy Being There, because the band believed that Peter Sellers' character Chance had an analogous mentality to the mindset of the album. Wilco sought to incorporate influences from other bands, but not to an overbearing degree; however, they were unable to accomplish this with songs like the Rolling Stones-influenced "Monday". Unlike radio-friendly A.M., the band had no preference about whether Being There could yield radio hits.

When the recording sessions were done, Wilco had originally recorded thirty songs, but were able to cut it down to nineteen songs covering a span of seventy-seven minutes. Tweedy decided that he wanted to release all of the material as a double CD, but was concerned that consumers would be reluctant to purchase it. The purchasing price of a double album was at least $30, but single albums cost (at most) $17.98. Tweedy approached record executive Joe McEwen, who had originally signed Uncle Tupelo to a Warner Brothers label, about selling Being There at a single album price. McEwen was reluctant at first, but was able to convince Reprise Records president Howie Klein to adhere to Tweedy's request. To compensate for the financial loss that the label would take, Tweedy agreed to cut most of his royalties for the album. By 2003, it was estimated that he lost nearly $600,000 because of this, but Tweedy remained satisfied by the deal.

Being There was the only Wilco album with Freakwater's Bob Egan. Egan was invited to come to the studio after Freakwater opened for Wilco for a few shows. He only played on two tracks ("Far, Far Away" and "Dreamer in My Dreams"), but accompanied the band on the support tour. It was the last album for multi-instrumentalist Max Johnston, who left because he was undergoing marital problems and believed that Bennett was taking over his place in the band. Jeff Tweedy performed as the lead singer and secondary guitarist. Jay Bennett was the lead guitarist, and also played a variety of other instruments. John Stirratt played bass guitar and Ken Coomer played drums. All members of the band played a different instrument on "Misunderstood".

== Reception ==
Professional ratings
Review scores
Source	Rating
AllMusic	4.5/5 stars
Entertainment Weekly	A
The Independent	5/5 stars
Los Angeles Times	3.5/4 stars
NME	9/10
Pitchfork	9.3/10
Rolling Stone	4/5 stars
The Rolling Stone Album Guide	4/5 stars
Spin	7/10
The Village Voice	B+

Being There was received positively by critics. AllMusic editor Jason Ankeny gave the album a four-and-a-half stars and referred to it as "the group's great leap forward." He praised the band's ability to juxtapose psychedelia and power pop with tracks that "wouldn't sound at all out of place on Exile on Main Street". Greg Kot, writing for Rolling Stone, gave the album four stars and lauded how it "venture[d] out into an anxiety-ridden world sure thing ... the solace they continue to find in rock and roll." Robert Christgau was more modest, writing "there's no point in denying Jeff Tweedy's achievement as long as you recognize its insularity." Ryan Schreiber of Pitchfork called Wilco "massively improved as both a band and as songwriters" but also noted that "the two-disc set is really nothing more than a marketing scheme." Being There was ranked the 14th best album of the year on The Village Voice's Pazz & Jop critics' poll for 1996. In 2003, Pitchfork named it the 88th best album of the 1990s. In 2004, Stylus Magazine placed 178th on their "Top 101–200 Favorite Albums of All-Time" list. The album was also included in the book 1001 Albums You Must Hear Before You Die.

The album was a marked improvement over A.M. on the Billboard charts. It peaked at number 73 on the Billboard 200, whereas A.M. failed to hit the chart at all. "Outtasite (Outta Mind)" was released as a single, and received moderate airplay on some college rock radio stations.

== Track listing ==
All songs written by Jeff Tweedy. Verse 5 of "Misunderstood" interpolates lyrics from Peter Laughner's "Amphetamine".

Disc one
No.	Title	Length
1.	"Misunderstood"	6:28
2.	"Far, Far Away"	3:20
3.	"Monday"	3:33
4.	"Outtasite (Outta Mind)"	2:34
5.	"Forget the Flowers"	2:47
6.	"Red-Eyed and Blue"	2:45
7.	"I Got You (At the End of the Century)"	3:57
8.	"What's the World Got in Store"	3:09
9.	"Hotel Arizona"	3:37
10.	"Say You Miss Me"	4:07

Disc two
No.	Title	Length
1.	"Sunken Treasure"	6:51
2.	"Someday Soon"	2:33
3.	"Outta Mind (Outta Sight)"	3:20
4.	"Someone Else's Song"	3:21
5.	"Kingpin"	5:17
6.	"(Was I) In Your Dreams"	3:30
7.	"Why Would You Wanna Live"	4:16
8.	"The Lonely 1"	4:48
9.	"Dreamer in My Dreams"	6:43

== Personnel ==
Wilco:

- Jeff Tweedy – lead and backing vocals, guitars, bass, radio
- John Stirratt – bass, piano, violin, backing vocals
- Jay Bennett – guitars, piano, organ, harmonica, lap steel, drums, accordion, backing vocals
- Ken Coomer – drums, percussion, guitars, backing vocals
- Max Johnston – Dobro, fiddle, mandolin, banjo, backing vocals
- Bob Egan – pedal steel ("Far, Far Away"), national steel guitar ("Dreamer In My Dreams")

Additional personnel:

- Greg Leisz – pedal steel ("The Lonely 1")
- Larry Williams – tenor sax ("Monday")
- Gary Grant, Jerry Hey – trumpet ("Monday")
- Jessy Greene – violin ("The Lonely 1")
- Dan Higgins – baritone sax, tenor sax ("Monday")
- Chris Shepard, Jim Rondinelli – engineering
- Martin Stebbing, Lou Whitney, Skip Bryant – additional engineering
- Ron Lowe, Mike Scotella – second engineering
- Skip Saylor, Jim Scott – mixing
- Bob Ludwig – mastering
- Dahn Davis – graphic design
- Brad Miller – photography
