= March 16–20, 1992 =

Studio album by Uncle Tupelo
- Released: August 3, 1992
- Recorded: March 16–20, 1992 at John Keane Studios, Athens, Georgia
- Genre: Alternative country
- Length: 44:38
- Label: Rockville
- Producer: Peter Buck

Uncle Tupelo chronology
Still Feel Gone (1991)	March 16–20, 1992 (1992)	Anodyne (1993)

March 16–20, 1992 is the third studio album by alternative country band Uncle Tupelo, released on August 3, 1992. The title refers to the five-day span during which the album was recorded. An almost entirely acoustic recording, the album features original songs and covers of traditional folk songs in near equal number, and was produced by R.E.M. guitarist Peter Buck.

Along with the rest of the Uncle Tupelo back catalog, this album was re-released in 2003.

== Background ==
In 1990, R.E.M. guitarist Peter Buck attended an Uncle Tupelo concert at the 40 Watt Club in Athens, Georgia. Buck was particularly impressed with the band's rendition of the Louvin Brothers' "Great Atomic Power", and contacted the band after the show. Uncle Tupelo singers Jay Farrar and Jeff Tweedy exchanged their interests in bluegrass music with Buck, and decided to collaborate on an acoustic music project in the future.

Two years later, alternative rock bands such as Nirvana broke into the mainstream. Farrar was irate about the pressure from the music industry to sound like the trend:

This should insulate us from that industry bullshit, people looking for the next Nirvana. I don't think anybody is the next Nirvana, certainly not us. People always talk about the next Beatles, the next Elvis. You can't predict that stuff.

Uncle Tupelo's frustrations with their record label Rockville Records grew when the label refused to pay the band's royalties for the sales of their first two albums. This resulted in a "nothing-to-lose context" for the recording of a third album. In what was a sharp contrast to the popular music styles at the time, Uncle Tupelo decided to record an album of folk songs.

== Recording ==
Before the band began recording, drummer Mike Heidorn announced that he intended to leave the band for personal reasons. However, Heidorn wanted to work with Peter Buck, so he agreed to postpone his departure until after the March 16–20, 1992 recording sessions.

The band stayed at Peter Buck's house while in Athens, Georgia, to record the album. Buck offered to host the band for free, so that the $13,500 budget allotted by Rockville could be spent to pay the fees of the recording studio and audio engineers David Barbe and John Keane. Buck encouraged the band to arrange a certain amount of material each night to keep the band on pace. Guitarist Brian Henneman also contributed and learned how to play mandolin—the same one that Buck used in R.E.M.'s hit "Losing My Religion"—and bouzouki for the album. The five-day span that the band spent in the recording studio was ultimately used as the title of the album.

The album's content reflected folk themes juxtaposed with new material from Tweedy and Farrar. Several of the songs have Christian themes but were placed on the album to reflect the "madness and fear that would drive men to wish for such redemption". Jeff Tweedy's lyrics were strongly influenced by Nick Drake's 1972 album Pink Moon. Farrar's "Criminals" paraphrases a George H. W. Bush campaign speech and was considered by music journalist Greg Kot to be one of the band's "angriest songs". Farrar's rendition of Sarah Ogan's "Come All You Coal Miners" (the title was shortened to "Coalminers" and the song listed as "traditional" on the album) lamented the harsh working conditions in the coal mining industry, but the choice was received poorly by some of the band's closest peers; according to singer Nick Sakes of Dazzling Killmen:

We could occasionally imitate Jay's singing and insert our own words: 'It gets real hot working down at my mom's bookstore.' It was a little too much to hear these songs about coal miners coming from regular dudes that worked in record stores and bought SST Records and went to Black Flag shows.

Three songs, the gospel tune "Warfare", the hymn "Satan, Your Kingdom Must Come Down" and the ballad "I Wish My Baby Was Born" were taken from High Atmosphere, a compilation of songs recorded by John Cohen in Virginia and North Carolina. Along with Ogan's version of "Coalminers", the murder ballad "Lilli Schull" had previously been released on Oh My Little Darling, a compilation of Southeastern folk song types released on New World Records. In a 2002 interview with Anthony DeCurtis, Tweedy noted that, of all of the songs that Uncle Tupelo recorded throughout their career, "Sandusky" holds a special place for him:

"Sandusky" is probably the track that I'm most proud of. It's an instrumental, it was a real collaboration and it just kind of came out of us in the studio, real improvised natural music, very simple. I think it's beautiful. I also don't feel I was that much a part of it, because it just happened, and maybe that makes it easier to listen to it. That's the one that sticks out in my mind the most.

== Release and reception ==
Professional ratings
Review scores
Source	Rating
AllMusic	4.5/5 stars
Alternative Press	favorable
Chicago Tribune	2.5/4 stars
CMJ	favorable
Entertainment Weekly	B+
Pitchfork	8.4/10
Q	4/5 stars
Rolling Stone	(2003)
Uncut	4/5 stars

March 16–20, 1992 sold more copies than their first two albums, No Depression and Still Feel Gone, combined. Uncle Tupelo embarked on a tour of small clubs to promote the album. However, the band resisted performing material from March, since many of the venues attracted a punk rock audience; Tweedy thought "it would have been suicide" if Uncle Tupelo performed acoustic songs.

The album generated mostly positive reviews. Jason Ankeny of AllMusic called the album "a brilliant resurrection of a bygone era of American folk artistry". Bill Wyman of Entertainment Weekly remarked that it was "a moving and sincere New Depression manifesto".

March was re-issued in 2003 through Legacy Records. The re-release contained five bonus tracks: acoustic demos of "Grindstone" and The Stooges' "I Wanna Be Your Dog", a live version of "Moonshiner", the previously unreleased "Take My Word", and a version of the theme song from The Waltons. Reviews for the re-issue were also mostly positive. Pitchfork writer William Bowers called March Uncle Tupelo's best album "by far", claiming "The acoustic guitar has rarely sounded better than it does here." However, Bowers also criticized the addition of the bonus tracks.

== Track listing ==
No.	Title	Writer(s)	Lead vocals	Length
1.	"Grindstone"	Jay Farrar	Farrar	3:16
2.	"Coalminers"	Sarah Ogan Gunning	Farrar	2:33
3.	"Wait Up"	Jeff Tweedy	Tweedy	2:09
4.	"Criminals"	Farrar	Farrar	2:20
5.	"Shaky Ground"	Farrar	Farrar	2:49
6.	"Satan, Your Kingdom Must Come Down"	Traditional, arr. Farrar, Tweedy	Tweedy	1:53
7.	"Black Eye"	Tweedy	Tweedy	2:19
8.	"Moonshiner" (Traditional) –"	Traditional, arr. Farrar, Tweedy	Farrar	4:23
9.	"I Wish My Baby Was Born"	Traditional, arr. Farrar, Tweedy	Tweedy	1:39
10.	"Atomic Power"	Ira Louvin, Charlie Louvin, Buddy Bain	Farrar	1:51
11.	"Lilli Schull"	Traditional, arr. Farrar, Tweedy	Farrar	5:15
12.	"Warfare"	Traditional, arr. Farrar, Tweedy	Tweedy	3:43
13.	"Fatal Wound"	Tweedy	Tweedy	4:09
14.	"Sandusky"	Farrar, Tweedy	instrumental	3:43
15.	"Wipe the Clock"	Farrar	Farrar	2:36
Total length:				44:38

2003 CD reissue bonus tracks
No.	Title	Writer(s)	Lead vocals	Length
16.	"Take My Word" (B-side to "Sauget Wind" single, 1992)	Farrar, Tweedy, Mike Heidorn	instrumental	2:03
17.	"Grindstone" (1991 acoustic demo)	Farrar	Farrar	3:55
18.	"Atomic Power" (1991 acoustic demo)	I. Louvin, C. Louvin, Bain	Farrar	1:35
19.	"I Wanna Be Your Dog" (1991 acoustic demo)	Iggy Pop, Dave Alexander, Ron Asheton, Scott Asheton	Tweedy	3:50
20.	"Moonshiner" (live 1/24/1993)	Traditional, arr. Farrar, Tweedy	Farrar	5:05
21.	"The Walton's (Theme)" (1991 acoustic demo, hidden track)	Jerry Goldsmith	instrumental	1:13
Total length:				62:25

- Tracks 17–19 and 21 previously unreleased.

== Credits ==
- Jay Farrar – guitar, 12 string guitar, vocals, harmonica, bass guitar
- Jeff Tweedy – bass guitar, vocals, guitar, 12 string guitar
- Mike Heidorn – drums, cymbals, tambourine

Additional personnel

- Andy Carlson – violin
- Bill Holmes – accordion
- Brian Henneman – mandolin; banjo (track 3), bouzouki (track 5), guitar (track 8), slide guitar (track 11)
- John Keane – engineering, mixing, pedal steel guitar; guitar (track 7), bass guitar (track 13), banjo (track 14)
- David Barbe – engineering; bass guitar (track 5)
- Peter Buck – producer, feedback
