= Max Johnston (musician) =

American musician

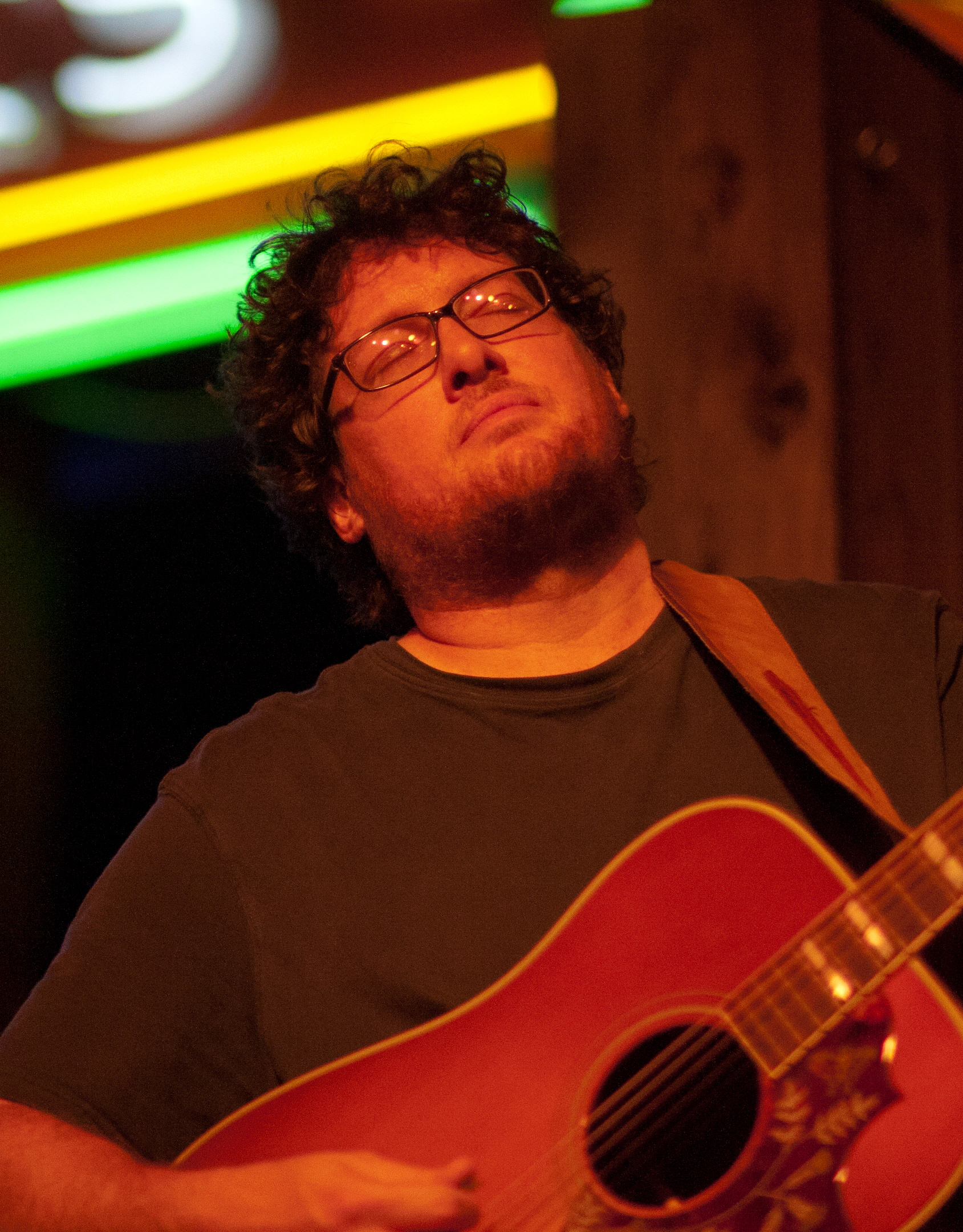
- Johnston in 2011

Background information
- Origin: United States
- Genre: Alternative folk
- Occupations: Musician; songwriter
- Instruments: Guitar; fiddle; dobro; banjo; mandolin
- Website: max-johnston.com

Max Johnston is a songwriter and multi-instrumentalist best known for his work on fiddle, Dobro, banjo, and mandolin with the bands Uncle Tupelo, Wilco and more recently, The Gourds. Johnston is the younger brother of singer-songwriter Michelle Shocked and has supported her in concert tours.

== Career ==
Johnston began performing with Uncle Tupelo in the fall of 1992 during the "Arkansas Traveler Review tour" during which Uncle Tupelo was the opening act for a bill including The Band, Taj Mahal, and headliner, Michelle Shocked. Although the tour fell apart after just a few shows, Johnston continued to play with Uncle Tupelo occasionally at first, and then as a regular part of the band appearing on the group's final studio album, Anodyne.

Following the departure of Jay Farrar in May 1994, the remaining members of Uncle Tupelo, including Johnston, Ken Coomer, and John Stirratt, formed the band Wilco under the leadership of Jeff Tweedy. Johnston left Wilco shortly after their second album, Being There in 1996 to form his own short-lived band, the Pony Stars and tour with his sister, Michelle Shocked. (Some descriptions of events suggest Johnston was fired by his Wilco band-mates). Johnston was then briefly a member of the Louisville, Kentucky-based band, Freakwater, and gave instrumental support to singer-songwriter Steve Forbert before settling into his present role in 1999 with the Austin-based band, The Gourds.

Johnston was offered a position in The Gourds and immediately accepted it after sitting in with the band at their South by Southwest showcase. After years of performing mainly as a sideman for great songwriters (Farrar, Tweedy, Shocked, and Irwin), Johnston at last felt himself to be a contributing member of the band. "This is more mine than anything I've ever been involved with," Johnston stated, "I have a voice in this band. With Tupelo, it was like, 'Wow, I'm in Uncle Tupelo,' you know? But I didn't have much input. Here, I finally found a group of guys who listen to me, we communicate on a level I haven't before." By the time of his second recording with the band, Bolsa de Agua, Johnston had found his voice contributing the tracks, "Jesus Christ (with Signs Following)" and "O Rings". Johnston has continued to remain active with The Gourds, whose most recent release is 2011's Old Mad Joy. On October 7, 2014, Johnston released a solo album, "Dismantling Paradise".

== Discography ==
=== solo ===
- Dismantling Paradise (2014)

=== with Uncle Tupelo ===
- Anodyne (Sire/Reprise, 1993; rereleased Columbia/Legacy and Rhino Entertainment, 2003)
- 89/93: An Anthology (Sony, 2002)

=== with Wilco ===
- A.M. (Sire/Reprise, 1995)
- Being There (Sire/Reprise, 1996)

=== with Freakwater ===
- Springtime (1998)

=== with The Gourds ===
- Ghosts of Hallelujah (1999)
- Bolsa de Agua (2000)
- Shinebox (2001)
- Cow Fish Fowl or Pig (2002)
- Blood of the Ram (2004)
- Heavy Ornamentals (2006)
- Noble Creatures (2007)
- Haymaker! (2009)
- Old Mad Joy (2011)
- with "Clocker Redbury and Dusty Slosinger", (dual pseudonyms for Gourd's Bassist, Jimmy Smith)
  - Slosinger/Redbury (2000), Johnston listed as "Trevor Rivera".
  - Cold War's Hot Water Shower (2001), as "Trevor Rivera"
- with Kevin Russell's Junker, (solo effort for Gourd's Kevin Russell)
  - Buttermilk & Rifles (2002)

=== Other Recordings ===
- Arkansas Traveler, Michelle Shocked (1991), guitar.
- Rocking Horse Head, Steve Forbert (1996), banjo, Dobro, fiddle, mandolin.
- Soulages, Lazy Sunday Dream (2001), banjo, background vocals.
- The Palace at 4 a.m. (Part I), Jay Bennett & Edward Burch (2002), banjo.
