= Sons of Bill =

Band from Charlottesville, Virginia, USA

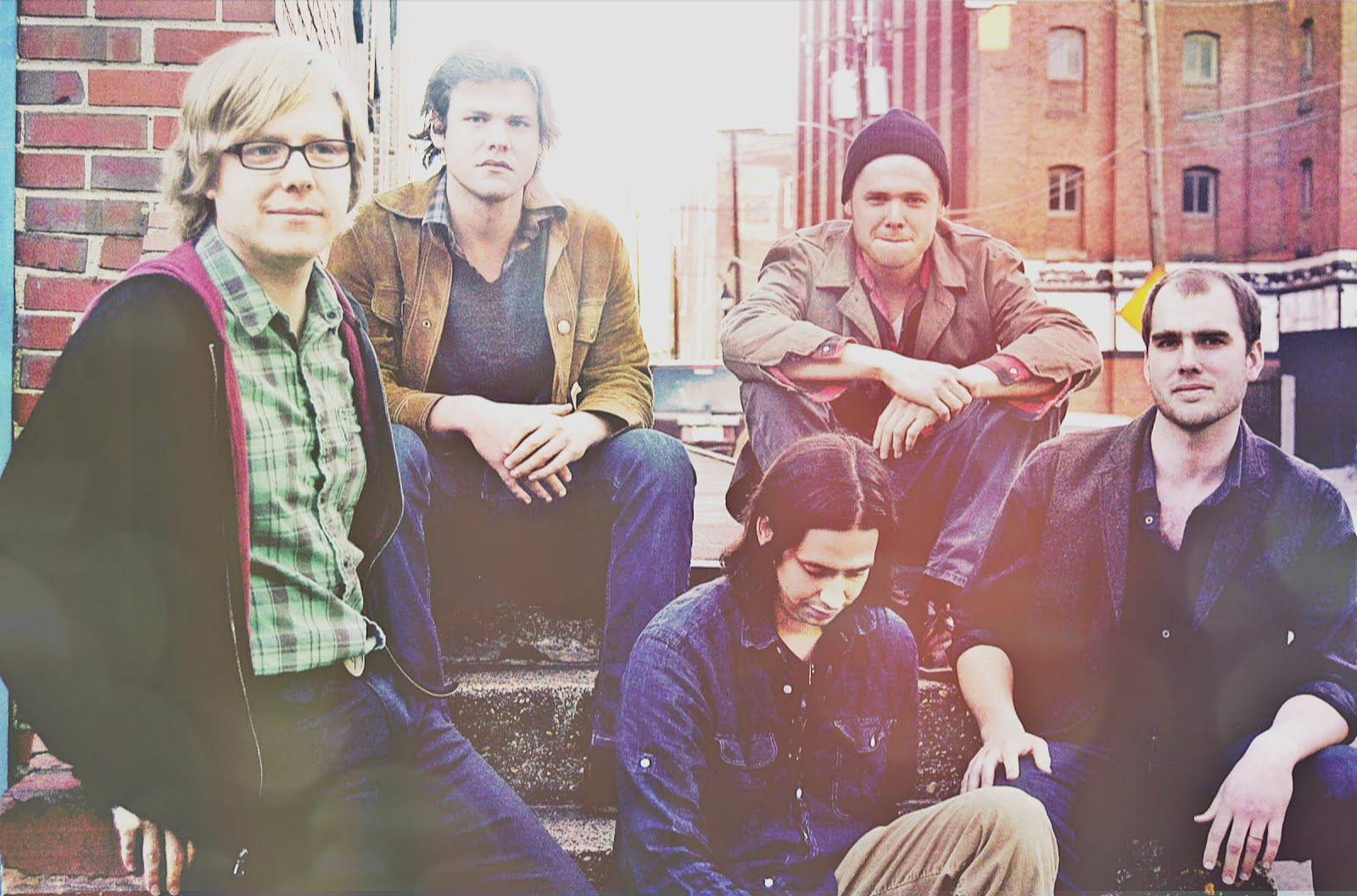
- In Richmond, Virginia.

Background information
- Origin: Charlottesville, Virginia
- Genres: Indie, Americana, Alt-country
- Years active: 2006 - Present
- Labels: Loose, Tone Tree Music
- Members: Sam Wilson; James Wilson; Abe Wilson; Seth Green; Todd Wellons
- Website: www.sonsofbill.com

Sons of Bill is a band from Charlottesville, Virginia founded by brothers Sam, Abe, and James Wilson, along with bassist Seth Green and drummer Todd Wellons. The band took their name from the Wilson brothers' father, Bill Wilson, a musician and professor of philosophical theology and Southern literature at the University of Virginia where the band initially formed. The band's album Love And Logic is their most successful to date; it was called "a classic roots-rock record for the modern age" by Rolling Stone, and "one of those delightful surprises that music so rarely springs in the age of digital access and constant, instant discovery" by British newspaper The Guardian.

== History ==
=== Formation ===
The seeds of Sons of Bill formed in 2005 when James Wilson graduated from Deep Springs College in California and moved back to Virginia. On his way home he visited his older brother Sam Wilson who was living in Brooklyn, NY playing guitar in a rock band and free-lancing as a jazz guitarist. The two brothers spent an evening in Sam's apartment playing old country songs that their dad had taught them, as well as some new songs that James had recently written.

Upon returning home that summer, James began playing those same songs with his other older brother Abe Wilson at parties and open mic nights around Charlottesville and the idea of forming a band was hatched. Abe was currently home for the summer from architecture school at the University of Maryland. Childhood friend Seth Green was recruited to play bass and Todd Wellons, who had independently played in bands with both Seth and Abe, was brought in to play drums.

The band played their first formal show on December 23, 2005, and within several months both brothers had moved home to Virginia to pursue the band full-time.

=== A Far Cry From Freedom (2006) ===
In February 2006 the band placed 1st in a Battle of Bands and won recording time at Crystalphonic Studios in Charlottesville. Armed with nine original songs written by James, in addition to two of Sam's compositions, they entered the studio after only three months and several shows together as a band. The album was independently released in April 2006.

=== One Town Away (2009) ===
In October 2008 the band traveled to Santa Clarita, California to record their sophomore album with acclaimed recording engineer and producer Jim Scott (Tom Petty, Sting, Wilco). The sessions produced the album One Town Away, which was released in June 2009 on Gray Fox Records. The album features songs written by James and Sam Wilson, as well as keyboardist Abe Wilson and bassist Seth Green. It also features Brian Caputo on drums.

=== Sirens (2012) ===
Sons of Bill began pre-production work on their third album in the Spring of 2010. Several months later they received a phone call from David Lowery of 90's alt rock band Cracker who was interested in producing their next release. The band first met with Lowery in the fall of 2010 to discuss plans for the album and subsequently entered Sound of Music Studios with Lowery and engineer John Morand in December 2010. In March 2011 the band initiated a fan-funded campaign through Kickstarter to help offset recording and production costs. The campaign was a success, hitting its $20,000 goal in just over 24 hours and eventually doubling that goal in the month it was active.

The band has continued working at Sound of Music, returning to PLYRZ Studios to work with Jim Scott, and recording at Mission Sound Studios in Brooklyn, NY. Sirens was released on March 27, 2012.

Track Listing

- 1. Santa Ana Winds (4:28)
- 2. Find My Way Back Home (4:06)
- 3. Siren Song (4:34)
- 4. Angry Eyes (4:54)
- 5. Turn It Up (7:27)
- 6. The Tree (4:26)
- 7. Life In Shambles (feat. David Lowery & Johnny Hickman) (3:10)
- 8. This Losing Fight (3:37)
- 9. Radio Can't Rewind (4:09)
- 10. Last Call At The Eschaton (5:20)
- 11. Virginia Calling (5:13)

Personnel

Sons of Bill

- Seth Green - bass
- Todd Wellons - drums, percussion
- Abe Wilson - vocals, piano, organ, guitars, Wurlitzer, accordion
- James Wilson - vocals, guitars
- Sam Wilson - vocals, guitars, lap steel, mandolin

Additional performers

- Johnny Hickman & David Lowery - additional vocals & guitars on "Life In Shambles"
- Alan Weatherhead - pedal steel & Mellotron on "Radio Can't Rewind"
- Luke Wilson - harmonica on "Angry Eyes"

=== Love & Logic ===
In the Fall of 2013 the band entered Creative Workshop studios in Nashville, Tennessee with Ken Coomer (formerly of Uncle Tupelo and Wilco) to record ten songs for a new album. Coomer originally heard the band from the "Bad Dancer"/"Higher Than Mine" single (mentioned below) that a friend had passed to him in the Spring of 2013. The Creative Workshop sessions were mixed by Grammy-winners Jim Scott and Tchad Blake to complete the album.

Love & Logic, their 4th studio album, was released on September the 30th 2014 in the United States and on January 27, 2015, in the UK and Europe.

Track Listing

- 1. Big Unknown
- 2. Brand New Paradigm
- 3. Road to Canaan
- 4. Lost in the Cosmos (Song for Chris Bell)
- 5. Bad Dancer
- 6. Fishing Song
- 7. Higher Than Mine
- 8. Arms of Landslide
- 9. Light a Light
- 10. Hymnsong

=== Additional Material ===
The band released two new songs, "Bad Dancer" and "Higher Than Mine", as a Vinyl 45 through WarHen Records for Record Store Day (April 20, 2013).

In conjunction with a tour of Germany, the Netherlands, Belgium and the UK in February and March 2014, the band released The Gears EP in Europe only on Blue Rose Records. The EP features three songs from the album Love & Logic ("Brand New Paradigm", "Road to Canaan" and a new recording of "Bad Dancer"), live recordings of "Turn It Up" (from Sirens) and the Neil Young song "Unknown Legend", and acoustic versions of "Santa Ana Winds" and "Radio Can't Rewind" (also from Sirens).

=== Oh God, Ma'am ===
Oh God, Ma'am, the band's fifth studio album, was released in April 2018. The album was completed after James Wilson suffered a debilitating injury to his hand that impacted his ability to play guitar. Brightest Young Things called the lead single from the album, "Believer/Pretender," "an absolute stunner, a sweeping piece of ‘80s-tinged guitar rock that recalls the sounds of New Order, The War on Drugs, and R.E.M., while still being unmistakably Sons of Bill."

== Personnel ==
- Sam Wilson: lead guitar, vocals, pedal steel guitar, harmonica
- James Wilson: vocals, rhythm guitar
- Abe Wilson: piano, organ, rhythm guitar, vocals
- Joe Dickey: bass
- Todd Wellons: drums

== Discography ==
=== Studio albums and EPs ===
- A Far Cry from Freedom (2006)
- One Town Away (2009)
- Take a Shower, Call Your Mother, Your Life Is in Shambles - EP (2010)
- Sirens (2012)
- "Bad Dancer"/"Higher Than Mine" - 7" single (2013)
- The Gears EP (2014) (Europe only)
- Love & Logic (2014)
- Oh God Ma’am (2018)

The band's website and SoundCloud page also offer several full-length live concert recording free to recipients of its e-mail list.
