= Solar Trance =

- Origin: St. Louis, Missouri, USA
- Genres: Hard rock
- Years active: 2000 - 2001
- Members: Matt Lindstrom; Mark Zschiegner; Jason Hart; Bradley Neil
- Past members: James Young; Ryan Nute

Solar Trance was a rock band based in St. Louis, Missouri, and included guitarist and founding member Matt Lindstrom, lead singer Jason Hart, bassist Mark Zschiegner and drummer Bradley Neil. Earlier incarnations of the group included drummer James Young and vocalist/guitarist Ryan Nute. The band was active in the years 2000 and 2001.

The band released its self-titled debut CD on Wednesday, August 15, 2001. The album featured the upbeat "There's a Life Somewhere" (track 6), brooding "Pleasing You" (track 2), and the bittersweet anthem "On My Own" (track 3). Other songs included "Cope" (track 1), "I Go On" (track 4), "Lost Time" (track 5), "Next to Nowhere" (track 7), "Soaring Higher" (track 8), and "Place in Time" (track 9). Promotion for the release included a live television performance of "On My Own" on KTVI's Fox 2 In The Morning show the previous morning, a CD-release party and concert at Sally T's in St. Peters, Missouri, on the day of the release, and an in-store appearance at Vintage Vinyl in University City, Missouri, the following day.

During 2000 and 2001, the band played live shows for audiences in Missouri, Illinois, Tennessee, Minnesota and South Dakota, at world-famous venues like Mississippi Nights and the Hard Rock Cafe in St. Louis, Pop's in Sauget, Illinois, the Blue Note in Columbia, Missouri, and both Gallery Cabaret and Lyon's Den in Chicago, Illinois.

The group disbanded in the fall of 2001.
