= Wilco: Learning How to Die =

Book by Greg Kot

- Cover illustration
- Author: Greg Kot
- Language: English
- Publisher: Broadway Books
- Publication date: June 15, 2004
- Publication place: United States
- Media type: Print (Paperback)
- ISBN: 0-7679-1558-5
- OCLC: 54959618
- Dewey Decimal: 782.42166/092/2 22
- LC Class: ML421.W52 K68 2004
- Followed by: Ripped: How the Wired Generation Revolutionized Music

Wilco: Learning How to Die (2004, ISBN 0-7679-1558-5) is a book by Chicago Tribune rock critic Greg Kot. The book was written with the cooperation of Wilco band members past and present. It covers the time period from when Wilco singer Jeff Tweedy was born, through the formation and breakup of Uncle Tupelo, and the career of Wilco through their 2004 album A Ghost Is Born. It is primarily written as an oral history, featuring interviews with Tweedy, John Stirratt, and other Wilco members, as well as manager Tony Margherita and Uncle Tupelo drummer Mike Heidorn. The book's title comes from a lyric of Wilco's "War on War", which appears on their 2002 album Yankee Hotel Foxtrot. It was published on June 15, 2004, by Broadway Books. The book received positive reviews from outlets such as The New York Times.
