= Ripped: How the Wired Generation Revolutionized Music =

Book by Greg Kot

- Author: Greg Kot
- Language: English
- Publisher: Scribner
- Publication date: May 19, 2009
- Publication place: United States
- Media type: Print (Hardcover)
- ISBN: 978-1-4165-4727-3
- OCLC: 232979150
- Dewey Decimal: 780.285/46 22
- LC Class: ML74.7 .K68 2009
- Preceded by: Wilco: Learning How to Die

Ripped: How the Wired Generation Revolutionized Music (2009, ISBN 978-1-4165-4727-3) is a book investigating the business aspects of the music industry by Chicago Tribune rock critic Greg Kot who is the cohost of the Chicago Public Radio show, Sound Opinions. It covers the revolution of music access and consumption resulted by the digital age and the effects it has on the music industry. The book also details the ways that artists have altered their business model in response to these changes to take advantage of digital distribution and peer-to-peer file sharing. Kot uses his firsthand access to illustrate how major recording artists have responded to the declining relevance of the big record companies. The Metallica and Napster case back in 2000 is brought up defining Metallica's clear stance on file-sharing. On the other hand, already highly successful musicians such as Trent Reznor and Prince believed in giving away their albums. The book mentions Radiohead's prior hesitation of becoming an independent band due to having to deal with all the business aspects of the industry such as setting up their own business meetings. However, the band was not satisfied with the fact that their major label could not keep up with how fans were downloading their music off the Internet. Eventually Radiohead put up their album In Rainbows (2007) on their website through a pay what you want model where fans can decide how much the album is worth.

Kot explains that a reason why young people started the file-sharing trend was because of the inability to connect with pop music that the record companies advertised then. Teenagers went to the Internet to find music that they can better relate to. This played a role in building the audience of indie bands like Death Cab for Cutie, Bright Eyes, Clap Your Hands, Girl Talk, and Arcade Fire with little or no major label input. The music industry is filing lawsuits when it has a history of illegal actions such as Payola and taking advantage of artists; therefore, it is a contender for phony "moral posturing", according to Kot. Not making a deal with Napster instead to create a legal music downloading service in 2001 just further damaged the industry because other free music sharing websites were created. Kot thinks that keeping up with the way music is consumed in the digital age has not only benefited fans, but also musicians: "In this world, the fringe players could more easily find and build a dedicated audience, and a musical ecosystem encompassing thousands of microcultures began to emerge."

It was published on May 19, 2009 by the Scribner imprint of Simon & Schuster.

The book has received mostly favorable reviews. The Boston Globe claims it is "well-researched and highly opinionated," and that it "captures the exciting immediacy of Internet-spawned music," however pointing out Kot's siding with illegal downloading does not capture the negative effects it has on other artists. The Christian Science Monitor praises Kot's journalism saying that it is "even-tempered and provocative, factual, and soulful," even if the book does not conclude with a solution to the harm caused by file-sharing. The New York Times critic, Michiko Kakutani, bemoans the narrow viewpoint of Kot, who champions the position of young music fans who are reluctant to pay for all the music they listen to.
