= The Gourds =

American country band

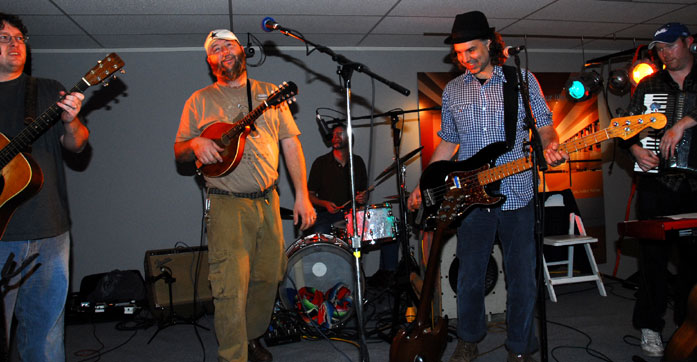
- The Gourds performing in Austin, Texas, in 2007

Background information
- Origin: Austin, Texas, United States
- Genres: Alternative country; progressive bluegrass; Texas country
- Years active: 1994–2013 (on hiatus)
- Labels: Munich; Watermelon; Sugar Hill; Eleven Thirty; Yep Roc; Vanguard
- Members: Claude Bernard; Max Johnston; Keith Langford; Kevin Russell; Jimmy Smith
- Past members: Charlie Llewellin
- Website: Thegourds.com

The Gourds are an American alternative country band that formed in Austin, Texas, during the summer of 1994. After playing together for 19 consecutive years, the band went on hiatus in 2013.

== Career ==
Primarily evolving from the Picket Line Coyotes and the Grackles, The Gourds first line-up consisted of Kevin Russell (vocals, guitar, mandolin), Jimmy Smith (vocals, bass, guitar), Claude Bernard (accordion, guitar, vocals), and Charlie Llewellin (drums, percussion). Llewellin was replaced by Keith Langford shortly after the second album was recorded, and multi-instrumentalist Max Johnston officially joined the band after being invited to play on their third album. By the following album, Johnston had also become the band's third songwriter, though Russell and Smith continued to share the bulk of those responsibilities.

Despite a sizable amount of original material, The Gourds are probably best known for a song they did not write, and for which they initially did not receive credit. A recording of the band's cover of Snoop Dogg's "Gin and Juice" was widely shared on the popular file-sharing site Napster, with the song miscredited to the band Phish. In fact, for most of the 16 years following their first live performance of the song, fans could regularly be heard calling out for the band's cover version of the song, sometimes before the show had even started. This led some to consider it an albatross, but the band continued to play the crowd pleaser, often adding a medley of impromptu cover songs to its midsection.

The Gourds' studio efforts were generally well received. Their high-energy live performances and constant touring earned them the reputation of a band that had to be seen to be appreciated. Fans followed their tours and recorded their live performances.

In March 2011, The Gourds traveled to Levon Helm's studio in Woodstock, New York to record their 10th studio album, Old Mad Joy. Produced by Larry Campbell, the record was released by Vanguard Records on September 13 that same year.

In August 2011, director Doug Hawes-Davis began shooting a documentary on the band that combined candid interviews with live performances, past and present. Musician and filmmaker Brendan Canty worked as a camera operator and ran location sound on the project, which drew partial funding from Kickstarter in 2012 and premiered in Austin at the South by Southwest film festival on March 13, 2013. The film was released on DVD in 2014.

On October 18, 2013, The Gourds announced that they were taking a hiatus. No reason was provided. Their final show before the break occurred on October 27, 2013, at Threadgill's World Headquarters in Austin, Texas. Despite having only nine days notice, Gourds fans from 26 different states were in attendance, and many more watched from home via live streaming video. During an interview the following year, Russell stated, “I think it’s done,” adding, “The only reason we said hiatus was that we didn’t want to say it was done, because that would be final". In response to Russel's comments, Langford stated, "I still wish that someday there could be a project of some kind. Knowing all these dudes, it probably wouldn't be an extended thing. But, some new songs or shows or something". Two months later, in December 2014, Russell seemed slightly more accepting of the idea when he said, "We left it open-ended for a reason . . . I have a little hope that one day we'll get back together and do something". To date, Bernard, Johnston, and Smith have not commented publicly on either the hiatus or the possibility of a reunion.

On December 19, 2024 The Gourds announced that they would be playing a 'One Night Only!' show on April 12, 2025 at Sam's Town Point in Austin, Texas. Tickets sold out quickly, and an extra date was added for an afternoon show on April 13, 2025. Again, tickets for the second show sold out quickly.

== Members ==
- Claude Bernard – accordion, keyboards, backing vocals, acoustic guitar, percussion
- Max Johnston – vocals, backing vocals, fiddle, lap steel guitar, mandolin, acoustic guitar, banjo
- Keith Langford – drums, harmonica, backing vocals
- Kevin Russell – vocals, backing vocals, mandolin, guitars, acoustic guitar, harmonica
- Jimmy Smith – vocals, backing vocals, bass, acoustic guitar, percussion, harmonica, double bass

== Discography ==
=== Studio albums ===
- Dem's Good Beeble – 1996
- Stadium Blitzer – 1998
- Ghosts of Hallelujah – 1999
- Bolsa de Agua – 2000
- Shinebox – 2001
- Cow Fish Fowl or Pig – 2002
- Blood of the Ram – 2004
- Heavy Ornamentals – 2006
- Noble Creatures – 2007
- Haymaker! – 2009
- Old Mad Joy – 2011

=== Studio covers and live originals ===
- Gogitchyershinebox – 1998
- Shinebox – 2001

=== Soundtracks ===
- Growin' a Beard – 2003
- Something's Brewin' in Shiner – 2004
- All The Labor – 2014

=== Side projects ===
- Smith: Slosinger/Redbury – 2000
- Smith: Cold War's Hot Water Shower: Featuring Dr. B – 2001
- Bernard: The Tinys – 2001 (unreleased)
- Russell: Buttermilk & Rifles – 2002
- Russell: Shinyribs: Well After Awhile – 2010
- Russell: Shinyribs: Gulf Coast Museum – 2013
- Smith/Bernard: The Hard Pans: Budget Cuts – 2014
- Johnston: Max Johnston: Dismantling Paradise – 2014
- Russell: Shinyribs: Okra Candy – 2015

== Television and film ==
The Gourds have been featured on Austin City Limits (2006) and appeared briefly playing their song "Declineometer" in the season one "Homecoming" episode of Friday Night Lights (2006). They were the subject of a 96-minute documentary by director Doug Hawes-Davis entitled All the Labor (2013). Their song "Dying of the Pines" was included in the HBO Documentary Unknown Soldier: Searching for a Father (2005) and their cover of "Gin and Juice" was used in the season three episode of My Name Is Earl (2007) entitled "The Frank Factor". The band has also scored the Mike Woolf documentaries Growin' a Beard (2003) and Something's Brewin' in Shiner (2004).

== See also ==
- Music of Austin
