= No Depression (album) =

1990 studio album by Uncle Tupelo

Studio album by Uncle Tupelo
- Released: June 21, 1990
- Recorded: January 21–31, 1990
- Studio: Fort Apache South, Boston, MA
- Genre: Alternative country, country rock, alternative rock
- Length: 41:41
- Label: Rockville
- Producer: Sean Slade, Paul Q. Kolderie

Uncle Tupelo chronology
No Depression (1990)	Still Feel Gone (1991)

No Depression, which was released in June 1990, is the first studio album of the American alternative country band Uncle Tupelo. After its formation in the late 1980s, Uncle Tupelo recorded a demo tape titled Not Forever, Just for Now, which received a positive review by the College Media Journal in 1989. The review led to the band signing with what became Rockville Records later that year. The album was recorded with producers Sean Slade and Paul Q. Kolderie at Fort Apache Studios on a budget of US$3,500.

No Depression was critically acclaimed and sold well for an independent release. It sold over 15,000 copies within a year of its release, and its success inspired the roots music magazine No Depression. The record is considered one of the most-important alternative country albums, and its title is often used as a synonym for the alternative country genre after being popularized by No Depression magazine. After regaining the rights to the album through a lawsuit, in 2003, Uncle Tupelo released a remastered version through Legacy Records, expanding it to include six bonus tracks.

== Background ==
Jay Farrar, Jeff Tweedy and Mike Heidorn began their musical careers in the 1980s playing in a garage band, The Plebes. After a few gigs, creative differences between the members led to the development of a punk rock sound for the band. Punk rock was unpopular in the St. Louis region so the band changed their style to blues-rock and renamed themselves Uncle Tupelo. At this point, they stopped performing covers and began to write their own songs.

Uncle Tupelo discovered a musical niche around Washington University in St. Louis, where bands such as Brian Henneman's Chicken Truck performed in a similar style. The trio recorded its first professional tracks in Champaign, Illinois, with future Chicago punk producer Matt Allison. The demo tape, Not Forever, Just for Now, contained early versions of several songs that later appeared on their debut album, including "Train", "Whiskey Bottle", "Flatness", "Screen Door", and "Before I Break".

The demo and the band's rigorous touring schedule attracted the attention of several music scouts. Record labels initially were wary of signing Uncle Tupelo, who they perceived as straddling "the divide between the countrified punk of early 1980s such as Green on Red, Jason & the Scorchers, and X—none of whom had bum-rushed the charts—and the Pacific Northwest grunge of Mudhoney and Nirvana, which was still years from breaking out commercially". In 1989, the influential CMJ New Music Report gave the demo tape a favorable review, praising its "mature, developed, seriously thought-out songwriting". This review prompted New York City-based distributor Dutch East India Trading to provide funding for Uncle Tupelo to record an album on their label Giant Records, shortly before the label was renamed to Rockville Records.

== Recording ==
"Factory Belt"
A sample from the fifth track on No Depression, "Factory Belt", sung by Jay Farrar. This song exemplifies the band's start–stop song technique, which was influenced by the Minutemen.

Six months before signing a full contract with Giant/Rockville, Uncle Tupelo recorded the tracks for No Depression over ten days in January 1990 at Fort Apache South, a musician-run studio in the Roxbury neighborhood of Boston, Massachusetts. Uncle Tupelo could not afford the cost of recording at a twenty-four track studio in nearby Cambridge so they used the cheaper Fort Apache studio. The album cost US$3,500 to produce, $1,000 of which went to the in-house producers Sean Slade and Paul Q. Kolderie, with whom the band became interested in working after hearing their production of Dinosaur Jr.'s album Bug. Kolderie and Slade allowed Farrar to use the 1961 Gibson Les Paul guitar J. Mascis used on Bug; this guitar gave the power chords on No Depression a richer tone.

Slade and Kolderie suggested the band de-emphasize the roots rock influences heard on Not Forever, Just for Now, and persuaded them to replace the harmonica parts with pedal steel guitar. For this, Slade and Kolderie recruited guitarist Rich Gilbert of Human Sexual Response for the recording. The tracks were recorded using little overdubbing; only a few banjo and[acoustic guitar parts were later added to the songs. At the suggestion of Slade and Kolderie, No Depression was recorded on eight-track so "the music would compress and 'jump' off the tape during playback". The recording sessions occurred before Uncle Tupelo officially became affiliated with Giant Records, so there was little input from the label.

Lyrically, the songs reflect the band members' experiences of growing up in Belleville. Farrar and Tweedy romanticized tales about unemployment, alcoholism, and the feeling of living in a small town, in an effort to emulate the profundity of songwriters such as Woody Guthrie. Musically, No Depression was influenced by the start-stop musical pattern of the Minutemen. The album's cover features a blurry photograph of the band that was taken by J. Hamilton; the cover is reminiscent of the albums released on Folkways Records.

== Music ==
Combining elements of punk rock and country music, No Depression "brims with an almost childlike naiveté", according to Saby Reyes-Kulkarn of Paste. Jason Ankeny of AllMusic stated the album's sound is more indebted to rock music than any of the group's following releases, making note of its "breakneck speed", crunchy tones and dissonance in the guitar work. The album's lyrics explore themes such as life in rural areas, work, alcohol consumption, disappointment and fear. Alkeny continued: "Uncle Tupelo's songs paint grim, unrelenting portraits of aimless Midwestern existence, split between days working ... and nights spent blurry-eyed and wasted".

== Promotion and reception ==
Professional ratings
Review scores
Source	Rating
AllMusic	4/5 stars
The A.V. Club	A−
The Guardian	3/5 stars
Mojo	5/5 stars
Pitchfork	8.4/10
Q	4/5 stars
Record Collector	5/5 stars
Rolling Stone	4/5 stars
Spin	8/10
Uncut	9/10

No Depression was released by Rockville Records on June 21, 1990. The promotional tour for the album began at Cicero's Basement, a St. Louis bar associated with Washington University. The tour took Uncle Tupelo to the East Coast and the Southwestern United States. Missouri radio stations KDHX and KCOU frequently played tracks on the album. By March 1991, No Depression had sold over 15,000 units, a hit by independent record standards. The proceeds from the album recuperated the $3,500 cost of production, but Rockville refused to pay the band any royalties. Farrar and Tweedy later successfully sued Rockville Chief Executive Officer (CEO) Barry Tenenbaum to attain the royalties. The surprise success of the album prompted Columbia Records to pay Uncle Tupelo to record additional tracks with Slade and Kolderie at Fort Apache Studio in mid 1990, but the results were not released. Rolling Stone did not publish a review of No Depression upon its initial release, although the magazine later featured Uncle Tupelo alongside The Black Crowes in an article about rising stars. Rolling Stone later called the album "one of the loudest, loneliest wails in recent memory to arise from the Midwest's recession-plagued plains". Robert Christgau dismissed the album as a "dud".

After the lawsuit with Tenenbaum, Farrar and Tweedy received the rights to their first three albums, including No Depression, which were previously held by Rockville. In 2003, Uncle Tupelo remastered and re-released No Depression with six bonus tracks through Legacy Records, a Sony Music label. Among the bonus tracks were cover versions of the Flying Burrito Brothers' "Sin City", the Carter Family's "Blues Die Hard", and The Vertebrats' "Left in the Dark". The liner notes for the re-release include an article written by Mike Heidorn about Uncle Tupelo's early days and the creation of No Depression. Upon re-release, AllMusic referred to No Depression as "Uncle Tupelo's landmark opening salvo", praising its "undeniable electricity" and saying it brought "new life" to the fusion of country and punk rock. Rolling Stone critic Tom Moon lauded "the band's impressive songwriting range", but noted the bonus material is "pleasant but inconsequential". Pitchfork gave the subsequent 2014 re-issue an 8.4 rating out of 10, saying "No Depression is a significant record".

According to RealNetworks, No Depression is one of the most-important albums in the alternative country genre. This was partly due to the success of the alternative country periodical No Depression, which took its name partly from the album. Due to the impact of the album on alternative country, "No Depression" is sometimes used as a synonym for the genre. AllMusic critic Jason Ankeny noted that album helped Uncle Tupelo "kick-start a revolution which reverberated throughout the American underground". In 1999, Spin listed the album at number 63 in its list of the "Top 90 Albums of the 90s".

In 2020, Paste named No Depression the 12th-best album of 1990. Staff writer Saby Reyes-Kulkarni wrote: "The exuberance in the performances is so striking, it's as if you're listening to the sound of your own youth whooshing by in a flash. Mixing punk with country was hardly new when Uncle Tupelo caused a sensation with their signature hybrid of the two forms—cowpunk acts like The Blasters, Rank and File, Rubber Rodeo and The Meat Puppets had blazed that trail a decade earlier—but production courtesy of then-upstart alternative-rock producers Paul Q. Kolderie and Sean Slade helped position Uncle Tupelo within the zeitgeist".

== Track listing ==
=== Original release ===
All songs written by Jay Farrar, Jeff Tweedy, and Mike Heidorn except as indicated.

No.	Title	Writer(s)	Length
1.	"Graveyard Shift"		4:43
2.	"That Year"	Farrar, Tweedy	2:59
3.	"Before I Break"		2:48
4.	"No Depression"	A.P. Carter	2:20
5.	"Factory Belt"		3:13
6.	"Whiskey Bottle"		4:46
7.	"Outdone"	Farrar, Tweedy	2:48
8.	"Train"	Tweedy	3:19
9.	"Life Worth Livin'"		3:32
10.	"Flatness"	Tweedy	2:58
11.	"So Called Friend"	Farrar	3:12
12.	"Screen Door"		2:42
13.	"John Hardy" (CD only bonus track)	traditional, arr. Lead Belly	2:21
Total length:			41:41

2003 CD reissue bonus tracks
No.	Title	Writer(s)	Length
14.	"Left in the Dark"	Draznik	3:09
15.	"Won't Forget"		2:51
16.	"Sin City"	Parsons, Hillman	3:53
17.	"Whiskey Bottle" (Live Acoustic)		4:40
18.	"No Depression" (1988 Demo)	A.P. Carter	2:19
19.	"Blues Die Hard" (1987 Demo)	A.P. Carter	4:08

=== 2014 Legacy Edition ===
Disc 1 (original album)
No.	Title	Writer(s)	Length
1.	"Graveyard Shift"		4:43
2.	"That Year"	Farrar, Tweedy	2:59
3.	"Before I Break"		2:48
4.	"No Depression"	A.P. Carter	2:20
5.	"Factory Belt"		3:13
6.	"Whiskey Bottle"		4:46
7.	"Outdone"	Farrar, Tweedy	2:48
8.	"Train"	Tweedy	3:19
9.	"Life Worth Livin'"		3:32
10.	"Flatness"	Tweedy	2:58
11.	"So Called Friend"	Farrar	3:12
12.	"Screen Door"		2:42
13.	"John Hardy"	traditional, arr. Lead Belly	2:21

Disc 1 (bonus tracks)
No.	Title	Writer(s)	Length
14.	"Left in the Dark"	Draznik	3:09
15.	"Won't Forget"		2:51
16.	"I Got Drunk"		2:26
17.	"Sin City"	Parsons, Hillman	3:53
18.	"Whiskey Bottle" (Live Acoustic)		4:40

Disc 2 (demos)
No.	Title	Length
1.	"Outdone" (1989 Demo)	2:57
2.	"That Year" (1989 Demo)	3:14
3.	"Whiskey Bottle" (1989 Demo)	4:55
4.	"Flatness" (1989 Demo)	3:24
5.	"I Got Drunk" (1989 Demo)	3:07
6.	"Before I Break" (1989 Demo)	2:44
7.	"Life Worth Living" (1989 Demo)	3:25
8.	"Train" (1989 Demo)	3:31
9.	"Graveyard Shift" (1989 Demo)	4:58
10.	"Screen Door" (1989 Demo)	2:46
11.	"No Depression" (1988 Demo)	2:18
12.	"Blues Die Hard" (1987 Demo)	4:08
13.	"Before I Break" (1987 Cassette Demo)	3:11
14.	"I Got Drunk" (1987 Cassette Demo)	2:55
15.	"Screen Door" (1987 Cassette Demo)	2:23
16.	"Blues Die Hard" (1987 Cassette Demo)	4:00
17.	"Pickle River" (1987 Cassette Demo)	2:18

- Tracks 1–10 from 1989 demo tape "Not Forever, Just for Now", tracks 11–12 from 1988 demo tape "Live & Otherwise", and tracks 13–17 from 1987 demo tape "Colorblind and Rhymeless".

== Personnel ==
Uncle Tupelo

- Jay Farrar – vocals, guitar, banjo, mandolin, fiddle, harmonica
- Mike Heidorn – drums, cymbals
- Jeff Tweedy – vocals, acoustic guitar, bass guitar

Additional personnel

- Rich Gilbert – pedal steel guitar
- J. Hamilton – photography
- Paul Q. Kolderie – production, audio engineering, sound effects
- Sean Slade – production, piano, engineering, background vocals

== Notes ==
- Kot, Greg (2004). Wilco: Learning How to Die (1st ed.). New York City, NY: Broadway Books. ISBN 0-7679-1558-5.
