= Toy Horses =

Welsh indie rock band

Toy Horses are a Welsh indie rock band, originating from The Vale of Glamorgan during the late 2000s, composed of Adam D. Franklin (b. Cardiff 1984) and his step-father Tom Williams (b. 1965). The duo are multi-instrumentalists, but with Franklin on lead vocals. Despite their UK origins, however, their first professional recordings were made in the US. Demo versions of songs had been picked up US radio guru Nic Harcourt and they were invited to record in the US with Ken Coomer of the band Wilco. Not having any other band members, they were joined in the recording studio in Music Row, Nashville, Tennessee by Jim Bogois (a member of the band Counting Crows, and member of Sheryl Crow's band) on drums and Tim Marks on bass. In their live performances since then the duo have been joined by Tom Rees (drums), Jon Proud (bass) and Carl Prior (guitar/keyboards). While in the US they were invited to perform at the SXSW festival in Austin, Texas. Their style of music is seen as having an affinity with 60s pop music, especially The Beatles, evident in the melodic and playful tunes, albeit often hiding melancholy lyrics.

Their debut album Toy Horses, produced by Ken Coomer, was released by Albino Sparrow Records in April 2011 to critical acclaim. Their first single was "Interrupt" (released April 2011). In 2011 Toy Horses were short-listed for the prestigious Mercury Music Prize.

== Toy Horses Album Playlist ==
1. Play What You Want
2. And It Was You
3. Sordid Little World
4. Damage Done
5. Last Chance
6. Loyal to the Cause
7. Love at an Arm's Length
8. Oh Violet
9. No One's Ever Gonna Leave You
10. Interrupt
