= No Depression in Heaven =

"No Depression in Heaven" (Roud 17321, sometimes simply "No Depression") is a song that was first recorded by the original Carter Family in 1936 during the Great Depression. Although A. P. Carter has frequently been credited as the author, some sources attribute the song to James David Vaughan.

Over the years the song has been recorded by artists as diverse as the New Lost City Ramblers and Sheryl Crow. Uncle Tupelo made the song the title cut of their 1990 album, No Depression. Since then, the title has become synonymous with alternative country music. What is now described as the "No Depression movement" is covered by many fan publications including the magazine No Depression.
