= Still Feel Gone =

Studio album by Uncle Tupelo
- Released: September 17, 1991
- Recorded: June–July 1991
- Studios: Longview Farm, North Brookfield, and Fort Apache, Cambridge, Massachusetts
- Genres: Alternative country; alternative rock; country rock
- Length: 38:08
- Label: Rockville
- Producers: Paul Q. Kolderie; Sean Slade

Uncle Tupelo chronology
No Depression (1990)	Still Feel Gone (1991)	March 16–20, 1992 (1992)

Still Feel Gone is the second album by American alternative country pioneers Uncle Tupelo. It was released in 1991 on Rockville Records and re-released in 2003 by Sony Legacy.

== Reception ==
Professional ratings
Review scores
Source	Rating
AllMusic	3.5/5 stars
Chicago Tribune	3/4 stars
CMJ	favorable
Pitchfork	7.0/10
Q	4/5 stars
Rolling Stone	(1991)
Rolling Stone	(2003)

Still Feel Gone has been generally well received by critics. Pitchfork called the album "so much stronger" than Uncle Tupelo's debut No Depression.

== Track listing ==
All tracks are written by Jay Farrar, Jeff Tweedy, and Mike Heidorn except where noted.

No.	Title	Lead vocals	Length
1.	"Gun"	Tweedy	3:40
2.	"Looking for a Way Out"	Farrar	3:40
3.	"Fall Down Easy"	Farrar	3:08
4.	"Nothing"	Tweedy	2:16
5.	"Still Be Around"	Farrar	2:44
6.	"Watch Me Fall"	Tweedy	2:12
7.	"Punch Drunk"	Farrar	2:43
8.	"Postcard"	Farrar	3:38
9.	"D. Boon"	Tweedy	2:32
10.	"True to Life"	Farrar	2:22
11.	"Cold Shoulder"	Tweedy	3:15
12.	"Discarded"	Farrar	2:42
13.	"If That's Alright"	Tweedy	3:12
Total length:			38:08

2003 CD reissue bonus tracks
No.	Title	Writer(s)	Lead vocals	Length
14.	"Sauget Wind" (A-side single, 1992)	Farrar	Farrar	3:31
15.	"I Wanna Destroy You" (B-side to "Gun" single, 1991; The Soft Boys cover)	Robyn Hitchcock	Farrar	2:30
16.	"Watch Me Fall" (demo version)		Tweedy	2:08
17.	"Looking for a Way Out" (demo – fast version)		Farrar	2:03
18.	"If That's Alright" (demo – fast acoustic version)		Tweedy	3:03
Total length:				51:23

- Tracks 16–18 previously unreleased.

== Personnel ==
- Jay Farrar – electric and acoustic guitars, vocals, banjo, mandolin, harmonica
- Jeff Tweedy – bass, vocals; acoustic guitar (tracks 1, 13)
- Mike Heidorn – drums

Additional personnel

- Chris Bess – piano (track 3), accordion (track 6)
- Sean Slade – organ (tracks 5, 6), piano (track 11)
- Gary Louris – additional electric guitar (tracks 6, 8, 11)
- Brian Henneman – acoustic guitar (track 10)
- Rich Gilbert – Optigan (track 13)
