= No Depression (magazine) =

Roots music magazine

- The Summer 2019 issue of No Depression journal
- Editor: Hilary Saunders
- Categories: Music journal
- Publisher: FreshGrass Foundation
- First issue: September 1995
- Country: United States
- Language: English
- Website: nodepression.org
- ISSN: 1088-4971

No Depression is an online publication that previously operated as a bi-monthly print magazine from 1995 to 2008 and quarterly journal from 2015 to 2025. In print, the publication focused on long-form music reporting and analysis connecting contemporary artists to American roots music. In April 2020, No Depression introduced digital versions of its print journal. While the print version was ad-free, the digital editions include advertisements related to roots music. Contributors to the journal include roots musicians, professional critics, reporters, photographers, illustrators, and artists.

The online edition was originally crowd-sourced through contributions from fans, regular columnists, and staff reviewers. In 2019, the website stopped accepting community posts to align its content with the print version.

In May 2025, No Depression retired its print journal and transitioned to publishing its roots music journalism only through a membership-based website.

== History ==
No Depression was launched in September 1995 (as a quarterly) by co-editors/co-founders Grant Alden and Peter Blackstock. Kyla Fairchild, who handled the business functions of the magazine from the beginning, became a co-publisher with Alden and Blackstock in 1998. The magazine was named for the Carter Family song "No Depression in Heaven," the 1990 album No Depression by the band Uncle Tupelo, and an early AOL online discussion group on alternative country called The No Depression Folder.

No Depression has received the Utne Reader Independent Press Awards for Arts & Literature coverage, and was cited as one of the nation's Top 20 magazines of any kind in 2004 by the Chicago Tribune.

Two No Depression music festivals took place at Marymoore Park, just outside Seattle. The first was on July 11, 2009, and featured Gillian Welch, Iron and Wine, Patterson Hood and the Screwtopians, Jesse Sykes, Justin Townes Earle, Jessica Lea Mayfield, Zee Avi, and Seattle roots music all-stars. The second was August 21, 2010 and featured The Swell Season, Lucinda Williams, The Cave Singers, Alejandro Escovedo, Chuck Prophet, Sera Cahoone, and The Maldives.

The publishers announced in February 2008 that the May–June 2008 issue would be their last. Buddy Miller was featured on the cover of the final issue, with No Depression declaring him Artist of the Decade. Soon after, co-founders Alden and Blackstock sold their ownership stakes to Fairchild in 2008 and 2010, respectively. In the wake of the magazine going out of print, No Depression launched a community website (NoDepression.com) on the Ning platform in February 2009.

Fairchild sold her ownership of No Depression to FreshGrass LLC in 2014. In 2016, the FreshGrass Foundation – a nonprofit organization that supports roots musicians and music scenes around the United States – took over No Depression and the FreshGrass Festival which it operates in conjunction with Massachusetts Museum of Contemporary Art (MASS MoCA).

== Return to print, Move to digital-only ==
In May 2015, No Depression announced it would be returning to print after seven years of being an online-only publication. According to an article by Kim Ruehl, "we’re opening up pre-orders via Kickstarter for what will be a truly unique magazine – there will be no advertisements. Instead, the articles will be accompanied only by stunning photography and original illustrations. The paper will be larger and thicker than you might remember from the original incarnation, printed by one of the only carbon-neutral printers in North America."

In May 2025, No Depression made the decision to retire the print journal and publish all stories online. No Depression said on the topic "Rising costs of production and shipping made it unsustainable to continue. While we know the print journal meant a lot to our readers (and to us), this shift to online memberships allows us to focus on delivering great roots journalism to be published on our website as well other mission focused initiatives like our writing Fellowships with the FreshGrass Institute."

== History of print features ==
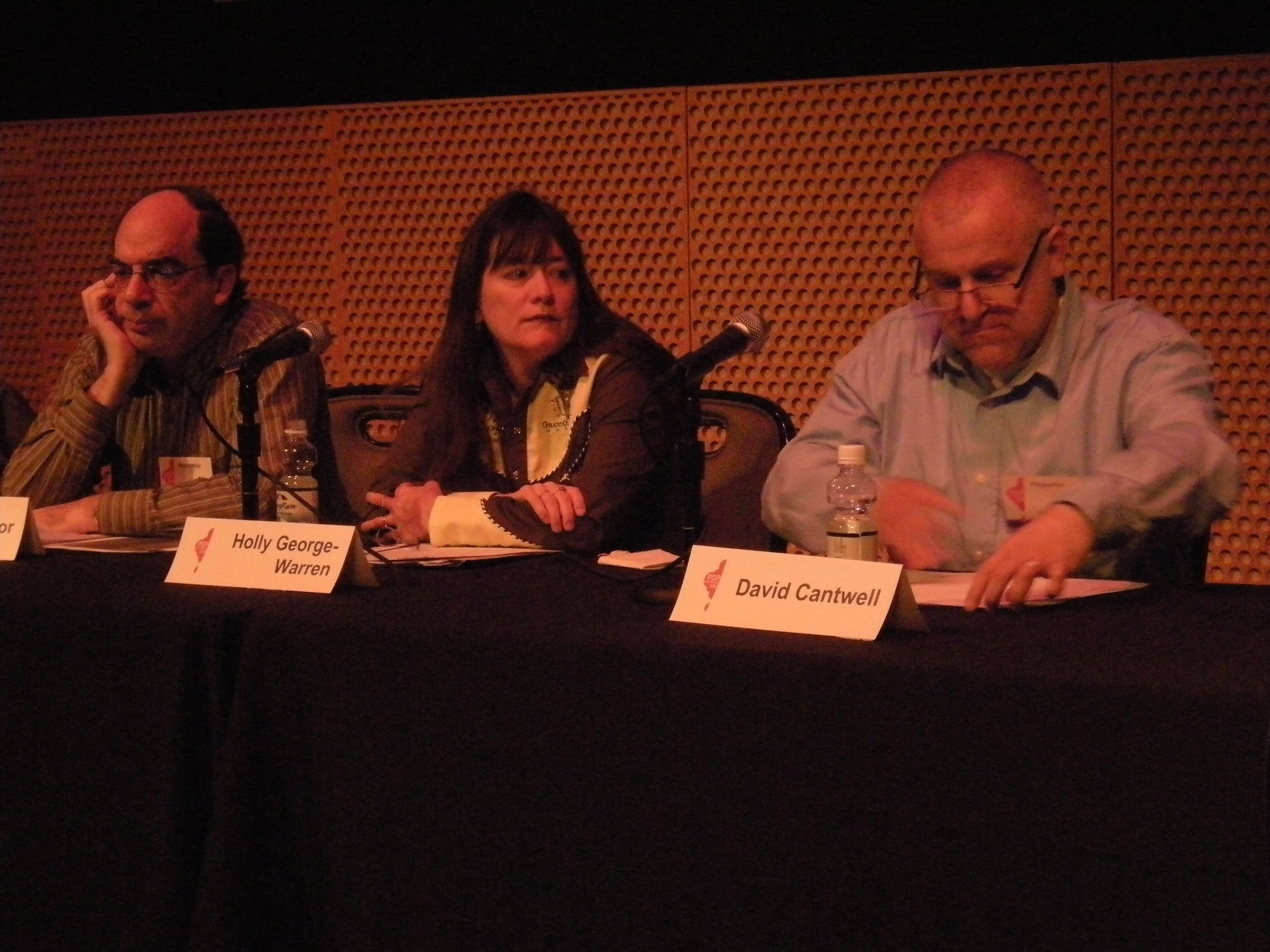
No Depression senior editors Barry Mazor (left) and David Cantwell; seated between them is Holly George-Warren, author of Public Cowboy No. 1, a biography of Gene Autry.

Features from the No Depression print journal (2015–present)

Title	Date
Return to Print	Fall 2015
Roots & Branches	Spring 2016
Homegrown	Summer 2016
Speak Up!	Fall 2016
Bluegrass Beyond	Winter 2016
Heartland	Spring 2017
Over Yonder	Summer 2017
Foremothers	Fall 2017
Singer-Songwriters	Winter 2017
Appalachia	Spring 2018
(Im)migration	Summer 2018
Innovate	Winter 2018
Standards & Stanzas	Spring 2019
Folk	Summer 2019
Wellness	Fall 2019
Vision	Winter 2019
Live and In Person	Spring 2020
Tools of the Trade	Summer 2020
Going Green	Fall 2020
All Together Now	Winter 2020
The Great American Songbook	Spring 2021
Voices	Summer 2021
Ghosts	Fall 2021
Good News	Winter 2021
General Admission	Spring 2022
Movers & Shakers	Summer 2022
Fall 2022	Fall 2022
Winter 2022	Winter 2022

Cover features from the original print magazine (1995–2008)

- 1995: #1: Son Volt (Fall)
- 1996: #2: Blue Mountain (Winter), #3: Steve Earle (Spring), #4: Honey Wilds (Summer), #5: Wilco (Sept–Oct), #6: Jason & the Scorchers (Nov–Dec)
- 1997: #7: The Waco Brothers (Jan–Feb), #8: Bad Livers (March–April), #9: Bottle Rockets (May–June), #10: Whiskeytown (July–Aug), #11: Robbie Fulks (Sept–Oct), #12: Ricky Skaggs (Nov–Dec)
- 1998: #13: Victoria Williams & Mark Olson (Jan–Feb), #14: Alejandro Escovedo (March–April), #15: Ralph Stanley (May–June), #16: Lucinda Williams (July–Aug), #17: Emmylou Harris (Sept–Oct), #18: Golden Smog (Nov–Dec)
- 1999: #19: Don Williams (Jan–Feb), #20: Steve Earle & Del McCoury (March–April), #21: Old 97's (May–June), #22: Gram Parsons (July–Aug), #23: Buddy & Julie Miller (Sept–Oct), #24: Dolly Parton (Nov–Dec)
- 2000: #25: 5th Anniversary Issue (Jan–Feb), #26: Jimmie Dale Gilmore (March–April), #27: The Jayhawks (May–June), #28: Loretta Lynn (July–Aug), #29: Allison Moorer (Sept–Oct), #30: Merle Haggard (Nov–Dec)
- 2001: #31: Rodney Crowell (Jan–Feb), #32: Billy Joe Shaver (March–April), #33: Lucinda Williams (May–June), #34: Patty Loveless (July–Aug), #35: Gillian Welch (Sept–Oct), #36: Jay Farrar (Nov–Dec)
- 2002: #37: Kasey Chambers (Jan–Feb), #38: Isaac Freeman (March–April), #39: The Flatlanders (May–June), #40: Kelly Willis (July–Aug), #41: Guy Clark (Sept–Oct), #42: Johnny Cash (Nov–Dec)
- 2003: #43: Alison Krauss (Jan–Feb), #44: Rosanne Cash (March–April), #45: Little Miss Cornshucks (May–June), #46: Drive-By Truckers (July–Aug), #47: Lyle Lovett (Sept–Oct), #48: Bottle Rockets (Nov–Dec)
- 2004: #49: T-Bone Burnett (Jan–Feb), #50: Patty Griffin (March–April), #51: Loretta Lynn (May–June), #52: Dave Alvin (July–Aug.), #53: Willie Nelson (Sept–Oct), #54: Iris DeMent (Nov–Dec)
- 2005: #55: Mary Gauthier (Jan–Feb), #56: Vic Chesnutt (March–April), #57: John Prine (May–June),
1. 58: Lizz Wright (July–Aug), #59: Nickel Creek (Sept–Oct), #60: New Orleans (Nov–Dec)
- 2006: #61: Joe Henry (Jan–Feb), #62: Kris Kristofferson (March–April), #63: Alejandro Escovedo & Jon Dee Graham (May–June), #64: Allen Toussaint & Elvis Costello (July–Aug), #65: Old Crow Medicine Show (Sept–Oct), #66: Solomon Burke (Nov–Dec)
- 2007: #67: Lucinda Williams (Jan–Feb), #68: The Shins (Mar–Apr), #69: Miranda Lambert (May–June), #70: Porter Wagoner (July–Aug), #71: Josh Ritter (Sept–Oct), #72: John Fogerty (Nov–Dec)
- 2008: #73: Shelby Lynne (Jan–Feb), #74: String bands special (March–April), #75: Buddy Miller (May–June)
