= Ken Coomer =

American musician and producer

Ken Coomer is an American musician and producer best known for his drumming in Uncle Tupelo and later Wilco. He was the drummer and co-founder of the Nashville-based band, Clockhammer, in the late 1980s/early 1990s.

== Career ==
Coomer produced the debut solo album of Vaquero's singer Chetes, which achieved platinum record sales in the Mexican music market. In 2017, he produced the debut album of AppleTree, a Colombian indie rock band. It's called Horas Perdidas and was named the #1 Colombian album of 2018.

As a member of Wilco, Coomer performed on A.M., Being There, Summerteeth, and Yankee Hotel Foxtrot, as well as Mermaid Avenue and its sequels. He has also played on or produced albums by Steve Earle, Frontier Ruckus, Arlo McKinley, Sons of Bill, Tim Finn, Will Hoge, Jars of Clay, Emmylou Harris, Toy Horses, Josh Hoyer & Soul Colossal, Malcolm Holcombe, and Shaver.

== Personal life ==
He lives in Nashville.
