= Brian Henneman =

American musician (born 1961)

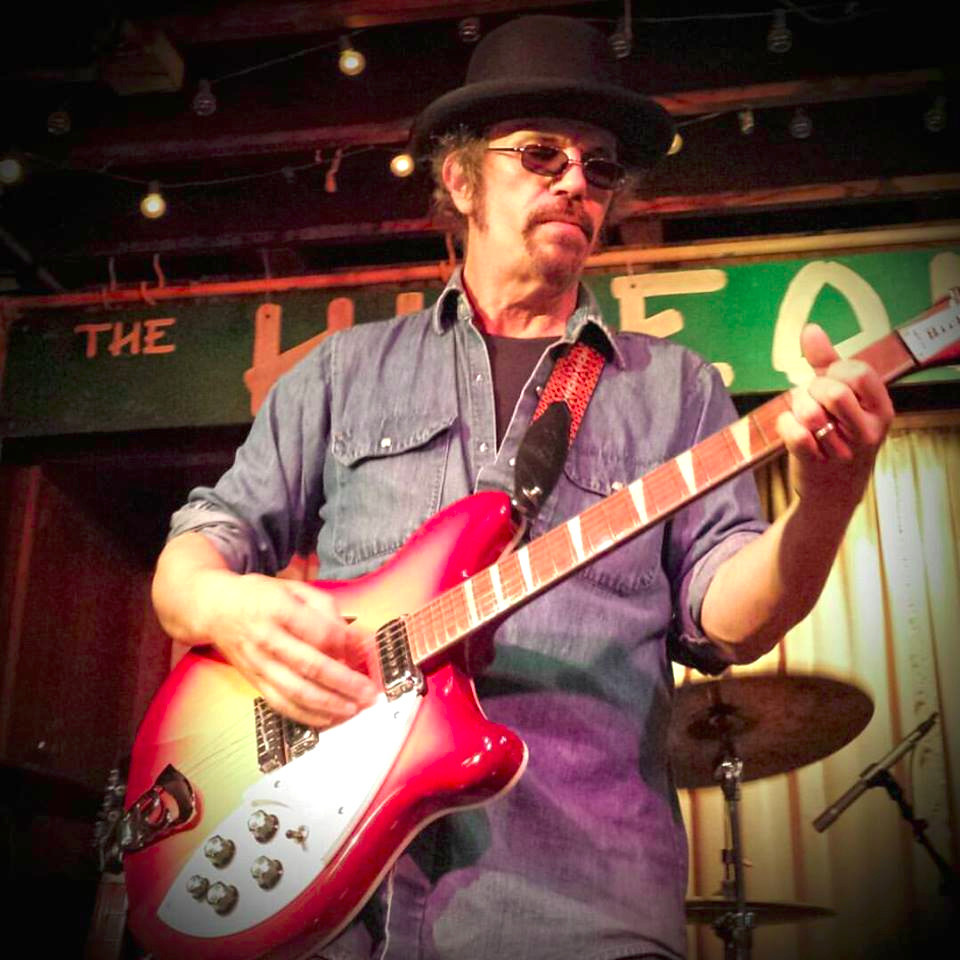
- Brian Henneman at the Hideout in Chicago in 2015

Background information
- Born: Brian Henneman; July 17, 1961 (age 64)
- Origin: Festus, Missouri, U.S.
- Genres: Rock; folk rock; country rock; hard rock
- Occupations: Musician, singer-songwriter, producer
- Instruments: Vocals; guitar; banjo; mandolin
- Years active: 1985–2021
- Label: Bloodshot
- Website: www.bottlerocketsmusic.com

Brian Henneman (born July 17, 1961) is an American musician best known as the frontman of the alt-country/roots rock band the Bottle Rockets, with whom he has been active as lead singer, guitarist and songwriter. Artists such as John Prine, Neil Young and Merle Haggard have influenced his songwriting style. Henneman began his musical career in the mid-1980s with the bands The Blue Moons and Chicken Truck, and also spent time as guitar tech/additional musician with peers Uncle Tupelo from 1990 before forming the Bottle Rockets in late 1992.

== History ==
=== 1980s ===
Sometime in late 1985, Henneman's band The Blue Moons played on a triple bill in Millstadt, Illinois, which also included Uncle Tupelo predecessor the Primitives. A few years later, Jeff Tweedy was instrumental in getting Henneman's next band, Chicken Truck – an original outlaw country rock band – an opening slot for Uncle Tupelo at Cicero's in St. Louis, Missouri. Chicken Truck released several cassettes in the 1980s, including "The 90 Minute Tape" and "Loud Music", the latter of which featured so many songs that Henneman's bands were still using material from it for their albums over a dozen years later. Some of the songs from that collection were written by or with Scott Taylor, a friend from Festus, Missouri, who continues to collaborate with Henneman. Chicken Truck and Uncle Tupelo remained on good terms and a frequent double bill with one another until Chicken Truck disbanded in 1990. Chicken Truck had been composed of Henneman, Mark Ortmann, and brothers Bob and Tom Parr.

=== 1990s ===
After Chicken Truck broke up, Henneman played occasional shows as a solo acoustic act, and sometime in late 1990 he began working as a roadie for Uncle Tupelo, occasionally playing extra guitar or mandolin with them. He became a staple during their encores, and played lead guitar on "Cortez the Killer", "Moonshiner", and many other covers. He also played extensively on the albums Still Feel Gone and March 16–20, 1992, and also on some of the Uncle Tupelo tracks that ended up on various compilations ("Blue Eyes" and "Movin' On").

Henneman, Jay Farrar, Jeff Tweedy, and Mike Heidorn formed a band called Coffee Creek, playing country covers in small clubs and bars between Uncle Tupelo tours. In late December 1991, Coffee Creek played at Cicero's for the first time. In March 1992 Uncle Tupelo, including Brian Henneman, went to Athens, Georgia, to record their third LP at John Keane's studio, this time with Peter Buck of R.E.M. producing. Henneman played guitar, mandolin, and bouzouki on March 16–20, 1992.

In 1992 Henneman recorded the solo 45 rpm single "Indianapolis," an autobiographical song which he had written about Uncle Tupelo's van breaking down on tour. It was released on Rockville Records and backed with two more originals, "Get Down River" and "Wave That Flag", featuring vocal and instrumental back-up by Farrar, Tweedy, and Mark Ortmann. Meanwhile, manager Tony Margherita shopped demos made by Henneman, which had been recorded with leftover studio time from the Still Feel Gone sessions. When those demos garnered a record deal with East Side Digital records, Henneman formed the Bottle Rockets with drummer Mark Ortmann (Chicken Truck, Blue Moons) in 1992.

Throughout 1993-94, during Uncle Tupelo's slow dissolution, the bands remained closely interconnected. In addition to Farrar and Tweedy appearing on the Bottle Rockets' debut album, Henneman and the two bands also shared the same management and often performed together. When Uncle Tupelo finally disbanded in 1994, Henneman played lead guitar on Wilco's debut, A.M.. That same year, the Bottle Rockets released their critically acclaimed album The Brooklyn Side and toured with Wilco and Son Volt in 1995.

"The late '90s exacted a heavy toll on the band," Peter Blackstock wrote in No Depression issue No. 48. Besides having their career held hostage by a staggering series of record companies they had signed contracts with that folded and/or floundered, a UPS strike holding up distribution of one of their new records as well as band personnel changes, Henneman's parents both died within six weeks of each other. The band had been touring with Lucinda Williams and had to leave the tour prematurely.

=== 2000s ===
Despite these difficulties, in 2005 the Bottle Rockets stabilized from the upheavals with their good nature and trailblazing edge intact. Henneman and Ortmann got the band back on course, along with new additions John Horton and Keith Voegele; they remain the current line-up of band members. The band also re-hired their manager from the early days, Bob Andrews.

As noted in a New York Times article by William Hogeland, the Bottle Rockets' songwriting has been likened to Woody Guthrie's folk style in "spirit, smarts, and satire".

The Bottle Rockets' first live album Live in Heilbronn Germany was released in February 2006. The double-disc set was recorded on July 17, 2005, at the Burgerhaus in Heilbronn-Bockingen, Germany (which also happened to be Henneman's birthday). It was released in Europe on CD and vinyl by Blue Rose Records.

Bloodshot Records released the band's next album, Zoysia, recorded at Ardent Studios in Memphis, Tennessee, with producer Jeff Powell, in June 2006. Zoysia received a spot on novelist/audiophile Stephen King's Best Records of 2006 list in Entertainment Weekly magazine. In 2006, Jeff Tweedy joined Henneman and the Bottle Rockets onstage in Chicago for reunion renditions of "Passenger Side" and "Casino Queen" (both from A.M.), and a cover of Neil Young's "Walk On".

The band celebrated its 15th anniversary throughout 2008 with a series of 15 special shows and a contest to win the Creston Electric Instruments custom guitar Henneman played at each of the shows. The Bottle Rockets teamed up again with producer Eric Ambel (Brooklyn Side, 24 Hours A Day, Leftovers, Brand New Year) at his Cowboy Technical Services Recording Studio in Williamsburg, Brooklyn, to record their new album Lean Forward. It was released by Bloodshot Records on August 11, 2009.

In 2021, Henneman announced that he was retiring from touring stating, “I no longer want to travel, don’t really have any burning desire to write songs anymore either. I just want to be a good husband. A good neighbor. A responsible homeowner. A little dog’s daddy. A guitar repairman. A guitar player in my kitchen, and in some local country cover band whenever that scene comes back around.”

== See also ==
- Music of Missouri
