= Uncle Tupelo =

American alternative country music group

- Uncle Tupelo's original lineup (c. 1991)—Jay Farrar, Jeff Tweedy, and Mike Heidorn

Background information
- Origin: Belleville, Illinois, U.S.
- Genres: Alternative country; country rock; roots rock
- Years active: 1987–1994
- Labels: Rockville; Sire; Legacy
- Spinoffs: Son Volt; Wilco
- Past members: Jay Farrar; Mike Heidorn; Jeff Tweedy; Bill Belzer; Ken Coomer; Max Johnston; John Stirratt

Uncle Tupelo was an alternative country music group from Belleville, Illinois, active from 1987 to 1994. Jay Farrar, Jeff Tweedy, and Mike Heidorn formed the band after the lead singer of their previous band, The Primitives, left to attend college. The trio recorded three albums for Rockville Records before signing with Sire Records and expanding to a five-piece. Shortly after the release of the band's major-label debut album Anodyne, Farrar announced he was leaving the band due to a soured relationship with Tweedy. Uncle Tupelo split on May 1, 1994, after completing a farewell tour. Farrar then formed Son Volt with Heidorn, while the remaining members continued as Wilco.

Although Uncle Tupelo broke up before it achieved commercial success, the band is renowned for its impact on the alternative country music scene. The group's first album, No Depression, became a byword for the genre and was widely influential. Uncle Tupelo's sound was unlike popular country music of the time, drawing inspiration from styles as diverse as the hardcore punk of Minutemen and the country instrumentation and harmony of the Carter Family and Hank Williams. Farrar and Tweedy's lyrics frequently referred to Middle America and the working class of Belleville.

== History ==
=== The Plebes and The Primitives ===
Jay Farrar, along with his brothers Wade and Dade, played in an early 1980s garage band named The Plebes. Hailing from Belleville, Illinois, The Plebes sought to enter a battle-of-the-bands competition but needed another high school student as a member to perform. They invited Jeff Tweedy, a high school friend of Jay Farrar, to join the band and play with them for the show. Despite a lack of skill with his instrument, Tweedy played an important role in the band by booking early gigs. While The Plebes had been playing music in a rockabilly style, Tweedy wanted to play punk rock like the music he originally heard the group perform. This caused tensions between Tweedy and Dade Farrar, who left the band two months after Tweedy joined.

Before leaving the band in 1984, Dade Farrar introduced its members to his girlfriend's brother Mike Heidorn, who joined the group as the drummer. The Plebes then decided to change its name to The Primitives, a reference to a 1965 song by psychedelic rock group The Groupies. As punk rock was unpopular in the St. Louis area, The Primitives began to play blues-oriented garage rock at fast tempos. They performed regularly at a wedding hall in Millstadt, Illinois, where Tweedy's mother Jo Ann collected the cover fee. They also performed regularly at B St Bar in Belleville with bands such as The Newsboys (later Sammy and the Snowmonkeys), Charlie Langrehr, and The Symptoms. Wade Farrar was the lead singer, but his commitment to Southern Illinois University and an attempted enlistment in the United States Army meant he could dedicate only a small amount of time to the group. Heidorn broke his collarbone during a concert in 1986, which caused the band to go on hiatus. Jay Farrar and Tweedy continued to write songs and perform at Heidorn's house while he recovered, and by 1987 they had restarted the group. The Primitives temporarily added Tony Mayr as a bassist so that Tweedy could play guitar, but a month later the band decided to keep Tweedy on bass and remain a three-piece. To avoid confusion with a successful British band also named The Primitives, they decided to change their name again, to Uncle Tupelo. Although they performed only 1960s cover songs as The Primitives, Uncle Tupelo took a new approach, writing their own music under their new name.

=== As Uncle Tupelo ===
An early poster for an Uncle Tupelo show, in the style of Chuck Wagner's original drawing

The Primitives renamed themselves Uncle Tupelo, a name created by combining two randomly chosen words from the dictionary. Inspired by the name, cartoonist Chuck Wagner, a friend of the band, created a character resembling an old, fat Elvis Presley. The trio recorded a four-song demo tape, which got them supporting slots opening for headline artists such as Johnny Thunders and Warren Zevon. Tweedy met Tony Margherita while working as a clerk at Euclid Records in St. Louis. After attending two of the band's shows, Margherita offered to become their manager. Uncle Tupelo began to play regular shows at Cicero's Basement — a bar close to the campus of Washington University in St. Louis. Bands playing in a similar style, including Brian Henneman's group Chicken Truck, often played at the venue, which by late 1988 was considered the locus of a new music scene. The band temporarily expanded to a four-piece with the addition of the guitarist Alex Mutrux, but soon reverted to a trio.

Uncle Tupelo recorded demo tracks in the attic studio of future Chicago punk producer Matt Allison in Champaign, Illinois. The demo, distributed with the title Not Forever, Just for Now, includes "I Got Drunk" and "Screen Door", as well as early versions of several other songs that would appear on the band's first studio album. The CMJ New Music Report gave the tape a rave review, and called Uncle Tupelo the best unsigned band of the year. The accolade drew the attention of independent labels, and the band decided to sign with Jay Fialkov and Debbie Southwood-Smith of Giant Records, who offered to book them at CBGB in New York City. Explaining the decision, the band said that "[our] original goals don't get distorted with an independent label."

=== Recordings on Rockville Records ===
"Factory Belt"
The fifth track on No Depression, sung by Jay Farrar. This song exemplifies the band's start–stop song technique, which was influenced by The Minutemen.

"Atomic Power"
The tenth track on March 16–20, 1992, sung by Farrar. Originally a Louvin Brothers song, Peter Buck approached the band after hearing Uncle Tupelo's version of this song performed live. It is an exemplar of the acoustic recordings found on March.

Shortly after Uncle Tupelo's signing, Giant Records changed its name to Rockville Records. The band's first album for Rockville, No Depression, was recorded over ten days in January 1990, at Fort Apache South recording studio in Boston, Massachusetts. The album's thematic structure revolved around their lives as adolescents in Belleville; examples are songs about wanting to avoid factory work and songs about fearing a potential Persian Gulf War military draft. Impressed by their previous work on Dinosaur Jr.'s Bug, the band wanted Paul Kolderie and Sean Slade to produce the album. Slade let Farrar play on the same 1961 Gibson Les Paul SG Junior that J. Mascis originally played on Bug. The album was released on June 21, 1990, and the band celebrated by playing at Cicero's for two nights.

In between tours, Farrar, Tweedy and Heidorn formed a country cover band named Coffee Creek, along with Brian Henneman (later a member of The Bottle Rockets). Henneman impressed Uncle Tupelo, and he was invited to be a guitar technician and occasional multi-instrumentalist for the band. While Farrar and Heidorn would avoid drinking too much after shows, Tweedy would continue drinking throughout the night. Although Tweedy stopped after he began dating Sue Miller in 1991, a significant communication gap had already been opened between Tweedy and Farrar.

By March 1991, No Depression had sold an estimated 15,000 copies, and was featured in a Rolling Stone article about rising stars. However, Rockville Records refused to pay the band any royalties for the album, a theme that would continue for the remainder of the band's contract. Over seventeen days the band recorded a second album at Long View Farm in rural North Brookfield, Massachusetts. Still Feel Gone, with a more layered sound, was also produced by Kolderie and Slade, with contributions by Slade, Henneman, Rich Gilbert, Chris Bess of Enormous Richard, and Gary Louris of The Jayhawks. The band was disappointed with the production of the album and decided to discontinue working with Kolderie and Slade. Soon afterward, Uncle Tupelo recorded "Shaking Hands (Soldier's Joy)" on Michelle Shocked's album Arkansas Traveler and joined her on the accompanying tour with Taj Mahal and The Band. However, the tour only lasted for a few shows because of managerial problems between Shocked and The Band.

Alternative rock had broken into the mainstream by 1992, and an album released in that style was expected to earn the group a major-label record deal. However, Uncle Tupelo did not want to follow in the footsteps of groups such as Nirvana, and decided to play country and folk songs "as a big 'fuck you' to the rock scene". Peter Buck, guitarist for R.E.M., saw the trio perform at the 40 Watt Club in Athens, Georgia and sought them out after the show. Buck was impressed with a version of "Atomic Power" that the band played, and offered his services for their next album. Over a span of five days, Buck produced the group's next album, March 16–20, 1992. Buck allowed them to stay in his house during the sessions, and charged no money for his services. Henneman's role was increased for this album, and he taught himself how to play mandolin and bouzouki. Despite turning away from the style of popular alternative rock, major labels began to show significant interest in Uncle Tupelo after March 16–20, 1992 was released. The album sold more than their two previous recordings combined, although Rockville was displeased that it did not conform to the style of popular alternative rock.

=== Major label contract ===
In 1992, Joe McEwen of Sire Records began to pursue the band. McEwen, who brought notable acts such as Dinosaur Jr. and Shawn Colvin to Sire, had been interested in them since hearing the Not Forever, Just for Now demo tape. At the urging of Gary Louris, McEwen offered Uncle Tupelo a contract. Band manager Tony Margherita invoked the $50,000 escape clause he had put in their Rockville contract, freeing the band to sign a seven-year deal with Sire. The deal required two albums and specified a budget of $150,000 for the first.

Around the time of the recording of March 16–20, 1992, Mike Heidorn had secured a steady job at a Belleville newspaper company and was dating a woman who had two children from a previous marriage. Uncle Tupelo had planned a tour of Europe, but Heidorn wanted to stay in Belleville with his girlfriend, whom he married in August 1992.

The band held auditions prior to the promotional tour for March 16–20, 1992, and two candidates stood out: Bill Belzer and Ken Coomer. Although Farrar and Tweedy agreed that Coomer was the better drummer, they were intimidated by his six-foot-four stature and long dreadlocks. The band instead selected Belzer as Heidorn's replacement, but he only stayed with the band for six months. Tweedy explained Belzer's departure:

I want to believe it was purely musical, and I honestly believe that it wasn't working musically. I also believe that we weren't emotionally mature enough to be close friends with a gay person at that point in our lives ... And Bill was and is a very proud and righteous gay person, very open about his homosexuality.

After touring Europe opening for Sugar, the band replaced Belzer with Coomer. The band also experimented with new members: John Stirratt replaced Brian Henneman (who left to form The Bottle Rockets) while Max Johnston, the brother of Michelle Shocked, joined as a live mandolin and violin performer. Stirratt became the full-time bassist, allowing Tweedy to perform more songs with the guitar.

Now a five-piece, Uncle Tupelo recorded their major label debut at Cedar Creek studio in Austin, Texas in early 1993. Anodyne consisted of live-in-the-studio recordings and included a duet with Farrar and Doug Sahm of the Sir Douglas Quintet. The album sold 150,000 copies, and was their only entry on the Billboard Heatseekers chart. The group toured until the end of the year, finishing with a sold-out concert at Tramps in New York City. Because of their concert draw, major executives at Sire began to see the band as a potential hit.

In 1993, the band contributed a cover of Creedence Clearwater Revival's track "Effigy" to the AIDS-Benefit album No Alternative produced by the Red Hot Organization.

=== Breakup ===
With the addition of Stirratt, Coomer, and Johnston just prior to the recording of Anodyne, Farrar and Tweedy's relationship became more tumultuous, leading to verbal altercations after concerts. In one account, Tweedy recalled:

Around this time, I would say something into a microphone onstage, and afterward [Farrar would] pull me aside and say, "Don't you ever fucking talk into that microphone again." He would misconstrue me talking into the microphone as more evidence of my out-of-control, rampant ego, more evidence of me feeling like I didn't have to be so fucking afraid anymore.

Tweedy felt the new members gave him a new opportunity to contribute to the band, but Farrar felt disdain for Tweedy's new carefree attitude. Years later, Farrar would claim that he had been tempted to quit the band after seeing Tweedy stroking the hair of Farrar's girlfriend, an act which he believed to have been a proposition. In January 1994, Farrar called manager Tony Margherita to inform him of his decision to leave the band. Farrar told Margherita that he was no longer having fun, and did not want to work with Tweedy anymore. Soon after the breakup, Farrar explained his departure: "It just seemed like it reached a point where Jeff and I really weren't compatible. It had ceased to be a symbiotic songwriting relationship, probably after the first record."

Tweedy was enraged that he heard the news secondhand from Margherita, rather than directly from Farrar. The following day, the two engaged in a verbal confrontation. As a favor to Margherita, who had spent a substantial amount of money to keep the band running, Farrar agreed to a final tour with Uncle Tupelo in North America. Tweedy and Farrar again engaged in a shouting match two weeks into the tour, due to Farrar's refusal to sing harmony on any of Tweedy's songs. The band made its first appearance on national television during the tour when they were featured on Late Night with Conan O'Brien. Sire had requested that the band perform "The Long Cut" on the show, which further irked Farrar since the song was written and sung by Tweedy.

Uncle Tupelo's last concerts, two shows at The Blue Note in Columbia, Missouri and two shows at Mississippi Nights in St. Louis, took place from April 28 to May 1, 1994. A special "last leg" poster was created for the occasion which facetiously promoted the band as "St. Louis's 4th best country band", based on a readers' poll in the Riverfront Times. On the last night, Tweedy and Farrar each performed nine songs during the concert, and Mike Heidorn performed as drummer during the encore.

=== Post-breakup ===
Following Uncle Tupelo's final tour, Tweedy encouraged his bandmates to join him in a new group, while Farrar searched for members for a band of his own. Tweedy was able to retain the rest of the Uncle Tupelo lineup, and created Wilco. They began rehearsing a few days after the final Uncle Tupelo concert, and by August 1994 they were in the recording studio for their first album, A.M.. Farrar asked Jim Boquist to join his new band, Son Volt; Boquist was a multi-instrumentalist who had performed with Joe Henry as the opening act on Uncle Tupelo's last tour. Boquist also recruited his brother Dave, and Farrar convinced Mike Heidorn to leave Belleville to join the group. Farrar's new four-piece began recording their debut album Trace in November 1994.

Wilco signed to Reprise Records while Son Volt signed with Warner Bros. Records. Son Volt had an early college rock hit with "Drown" from the album Trace, but Wilco maintained a more commercially successful career in the years to follow. Regarding the possibility of a reunion, Mike Heidorn reported in a PopMatters interview that "nothing's ever for sure, but I would have to say, 'No such thing'." Farrar said that he does not want the band to get back together, while Tweedy said that he believes that a reunion would not be productive musically.

Farrar and Tweedy sued Rockville Records and Dutch East India Trading CEO Barry Tenenbaum in 2000 over royalties that the label allegedly owed them, winning restitution from Tenenbaum and the joint rights to Uncle Tupelo's first three albums. After securing the rights, the band released a compilation entitled 89/93: An Anthology. In 2003, Uncle Tupelo re-issued their first three albums, which before the lawsuit had cumulatively sold over 200,000 copies.

== Influences ==
As The Primitives, Tweedy and Farrar were highly influenced by punk bands such as The Ramones and The Sex Pistols. However, they began to listen to country music because punk rock was not well received in the Belleville and St. Louis music scenes. While they originally were introduced to country by their parents, it was not until this time that they began to listen to it for leisure. Farrar typically wrote songs about Middle America, while Tweedy wrote about more mainstream topics such as relationships. Farrar took influence from authors such as Kurt Vonnegut and Jack Kerouac, whom he read while working at his mother's bookstore. As a singer, Farrar's lyrics would be front-and-center during performances, but the band's musical style was mostly driven by Tweedy and Heidorn. Jeff Tweedy said in an interview with the St. Louis Post-Dispatch:

We probably have more influences than we know what to do with. We have two main styles that have been influences. For instance, we like Black Flag as much as early Bob Dylan and Dinosaur Jr. as much as Hank Williams... To us, hard-core punk is also folk music. We draw a close parallel between the two. We'll play both in the same set if we get a chance. We don't have any biases as far as music is concerned.

Tweedy in particular was inspired by the Minutemen, and wrote a song about D. Boon following Boon's death in a van accident. The band has released songs originally performed by Creedence Clearwater Revival, The Carter Family, Lead Belly, Gram Parsons, The Soft Boys, The Louvin Brothers, Texas Tornados, and The Stooges. Releasing March 16–20, 1992 when alternative music was breaking through was a move inspired by Neil Young's decision to release the challenging albums On the Beach and Tonight's the Night immediately after the commercially successful Harvest. Critic Michael Corcoran likened the band's musical style to "Bob Mould fronting Soul Asylum on a speeded-up version of a Gram Parsons song."

== Legacy ==
Uncle Tupelo is credited as one of the founders of the alternative country genre, a blend of alternative rock and traditional country music. While the genre eventually became associated with solo artists such as Gram Parsons and Lyle Lovett, Uncle Tupelo is considered the first alternative country band. Some media outlets like the BBC have even suggested that they were the genre's sole creator. However, Tweedy and Heidorn dispute this claim, and Farrar says that there is no difference between alternative country and other genres such as roots rock. Heidorn commented in a Country Standard Time interview:

It's strange to hear Uncle Tupelo mentioned because what we were doing was in such a long line of musical history. People are wrong in starting with us and saying we started anything because we were just picking up the ball, starting with Woody Guthrie and on to the early '60s and the Flying Burrito Brothers that we were influenced by. We didn't start a genre. We contributed to a long line of fairly good music. That's the way we looked at it at the time—doing what was right for the song.

The band's first three albums influenced contemporary roots rock artists such as Richmond Fontaine and Whiskeytown. Uncle Tupelo's usage of distorted guitars to play a style of music that was known for its earnestness became a lasting trend in 1990s modern rock. Jason Ankeny wrote in AllMusic that:

With the release of their 1990 debut LP, No Depression, the Belleville, IL, trio Uncle Tupelo launched more than simply their own career—by fusing the simplicity and honesty of country music with the bracing fury of punk, they kick-started a revolution which reverberated throughout the American underground.

Their 1990 album No Depression lent its name to an influential alternative country periodical. Due to the influence of the album and periodical, the term "No Depression" became a byword for alternative country—particularly for bands with punk rock influence. The alternative country movement played an important role in the success of future traditionalist country acts such as Robbie Fulks and Shelby Lynne.

== Members ==
- Jay Farrar – vocals, guitar (1987–1994)
- Mike Heidorn – drums (1987–1992)
- Jeff Tweedy – vocals, bass, guitar (1987–1994)
- Bill Belzer – drums (1992)
- Ken Coomer – drums (1992–1994)
- Max Johnston – violin, mandolin (1992–1994)
- John Stirratt – bass, guitar (1992–1994)

Timeline

== Discography ==
=== Studio albums ===
Year	Title	Notes
1990	No Depression: Label: Rockville Records (ROCK-6050-2/1/4); Released: June 21, 1990; Format: CD (-2), cassette (-4)	The album's title became a nickname for the alternative country music genre.; The periodical No Depression uses the album's title as its name.; Re-released April 15, 2003 as CD only (Legacy Recordings) with six bonus tracks.
1991	Still Feel Gone: Label: Rockville Records (ROCK-6070-2/4); Released: September 17, 1991; Format: CD (-2), cassette (-4)	Re-released April 15, 2003 as CD only (Legacy Recordings) with five bonus tracks.
1992	March 16–20, 1992: Label: Rockville Records (ROCK-6090-2/4); Released: August 3, 1992; Format: CD (-2), cassette (-4)	Re-released April 15, 2003 as CD only (Legacy Recordings) with five bonus tracks and a hidden track.
1993	Anodyne: Label: Sire Records (9 45424-2/4); Released: October 5, 1993; Format: CD (-2), cassette (-4)	Re-released March 11, 2003 as CD only (Rhino Records) with five bonus tracks.

=== Compilations ===
Year	Title	Comments
1992	Still Feel Gone & March 16–20, 1992: Label: Dutch East India (6110-1)	Double LP album only; two albums packaged together with a new cover design.
2002	89/93: An Anthology: Label: Columbia (62223)/Sony Music (5076122); Released: March 19, 2002	Retrospective compilation album with three previously unreleased tracks.

=== Demo tapes ===
- All demo tapes are self-released on cassette.

Year	Title	Comments
1987	Colorblind & Rhymeless	
1988	Live and Otherwise	Recorded live at Blue Note in Columbia, Missouri.
1989	Not Forever, Just for Now	

=== Singles ===
Year	A-side	B-sides	Comments
1990	"I Got Drunk": Label: Rockville Records (ROCK6055-7)	"Sin City"	
1991	"Gun": Label: Rockville Records (ROCK6069-7)	"I Wanna Destroy You"	
1991	"Gun"/"I Wanna Destroy You"/"Still Be Around" (demo): Label: Rockville Records (ROCK6069-4)		Triple A-side.; Cassette version of the "Gun" single.
1992	"Sauget Wind": Label: Rockville Records (ROCK6089-7)	"Looking for a Way Out" (live) "Take My Word"	
1993	"The Long Cut": Label: Sire Records	"We've Been Had" (live) "Truck Drivin' Man" (live) "Anodyne" (live) "Suzie Q" (live) "Fifteen Keys" (live)	Cover of single reads "The Long Cut + 5 Live"; Promotional single only.

=== Contributions ===
Year	Song	Album	Comments
1990	"Before I Break" (demo)	Out of the Gate compilation	
1991	"Won't Forget"	A Matter of Degrees soundtrack	
1992	"Movin' On"	20 More Explosive Fantastic Rockin' Mega Smash Hit Explosions! compilation	Cover of the Merle Haggard theme song of the eponymous NBC TV series; the recording features Brian Henneman on lead vocals.
1992	"Shaking Hands (Soldier's Joy)"	Arkansas Traveler	Written and performed by Michelle Shocked; the song features Farrar, Tweedy and Heidorn as well as Bernie Leadon and Jack Irons.
1992	"Wait Up"	Stolar Tracks Vol. 1 compilation	
1993	"Blue Eyes"	Conmemorativo: A Tribute to Gram Parsons compilation	Cover of a Gram Parsons song originally recorded in 1968 by The International Submarine Band.
1993	"Effigy"	No Alternative compilation	Cover of a John Fogerty song originally recorded in 1969 by Creedence Clearwater Revival.
1993	"Are You Sure Hank Done It This Way?"	Trademark of Quality, Vol. 2 compilation	Cover of a Waylon Jennings song, originally recorded in 1975; performed with Joe Ely on lead vocals.
1993	"Fifteen Keys" (live)		7" compilation issued by the German magazine What's That Noise (WTN 006); also includes tracks by Cordelia's Dad, Swell and the Fellow Travellers.
1994	"Moonshiner"	The Best of Mountain Stage Volume Seven compilation	Recorded live at Mountain Stage in Charleston, West Virginia.

Uncle Tupelo also recorded a one-hour radio special that was released by Legacy Records in 2003. Legacy only distributed the CD, entitled The Long Cut: A One Hour Radio Special, to non-commercial radio stations as a way to promote the re-issues of the band's studio albums. The special is hosted by Lauren Frey and features interviews by Farrar, Tweedy, and Heidorn.
