= Mississippi Nights =

Music club in St. Louis

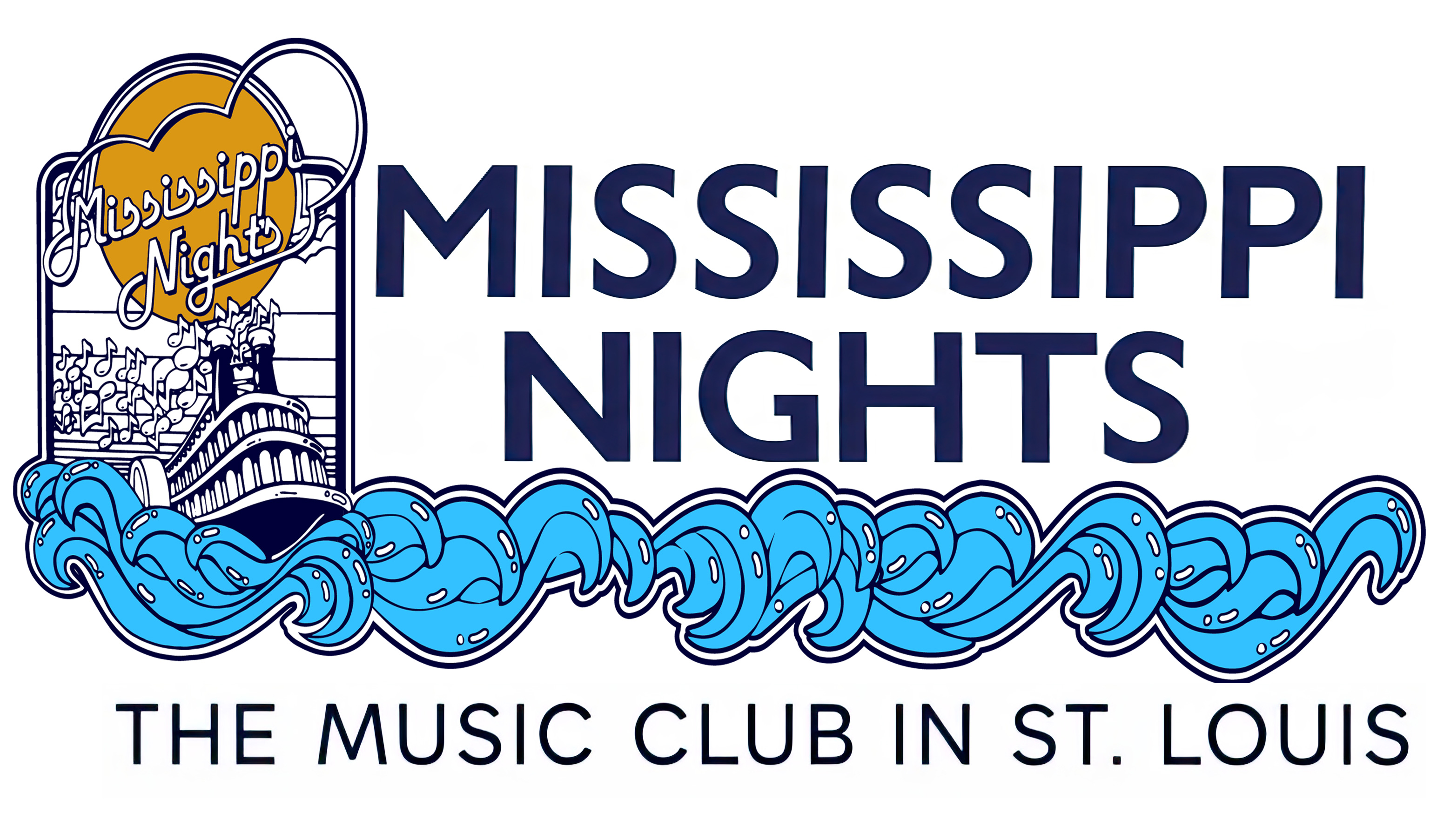

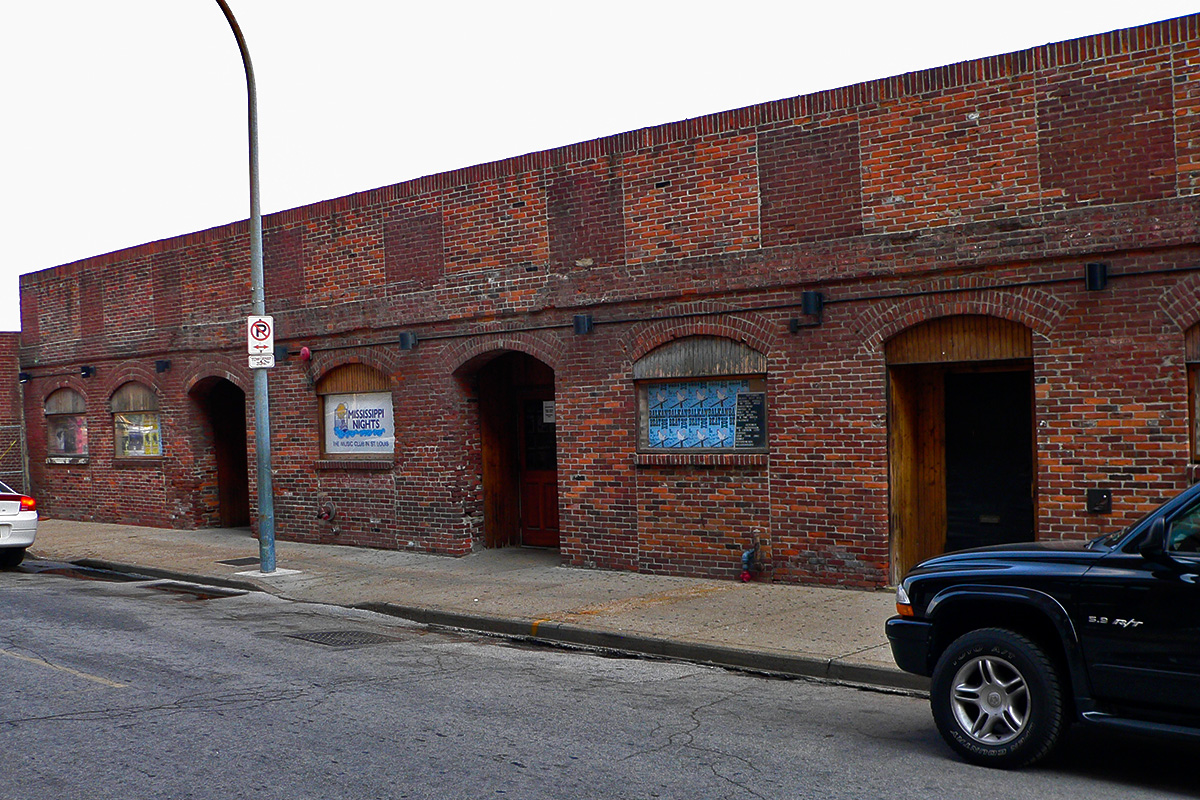
- Interactive map of Mississippi Nights
- Address: 914 N 1st Street; St. Louis, Missouri; United States
- Coordinates: 38.6329°N 90.1829°W
- Owner: Rich Frame
- Capacity: 1,000
- Type: All-ages Music club
- Current use: Horseshoe St. Louis

Construction
- Opened: October 11, 1976
- Closed: January 19, 2007

Mississippi Nights was a music club in St. Louis, Missouri, United States. It opened on October 11, 1976, and was located at 914 N 1st Street, on the western bank of the Mississippi River, four blocks north of the Gateway Arch in Laclede's Landing.

Concerts at the venue, which held up to 1,000 people, were often "all ages" events, with just over one percent restricted to patrons 21 and over.

In November 1978, future R.E.M. vocalist Michael Stipe fronted cover band Bad Habits at the club, where they were opening for Rockpile.

== Closure ==
In early 2003, rumors began circulating that the club would close to make way for Horseshoe St. Louis (at the time known as Lumière Place), a new casino development. The rumors were confirmed in early 2007, and the last show was held on January 19, 2007.

The last band to play on its stage was The Urge fronted by a band member from Mudworm, which also played. The Urge sold out 93 of 100 shows at Mississippi Nights.
