= Mike Heidorn =

American drummer

- Born: 1967 (age 58–59); Belleville, Illinois, US
- Genres: Alt-country
- Instrument: Drums
- Years active: 1987–2005
- Formerly of: Uncle Tupelo, Son Volt

Mike Heidorn (born 1967 in Belleville, Illinois), is a former drummer and founding member of alternative country bands Uncle Tupelo and Son Volt. Heidorn also played with the Uncle Tupelo precursors the Primitives (or Primatives) and the one-off band Coffee Creek with Jay Farrar and Jeff Tweedy of Uncle Tupelo and Brian Henneman of The Bottle Rockets.

== Career ==
Heidorn joined high school band The Primitives in the early 1980s. He was introduced into the band by their lead singer Dade Farrar, who was dating Mike's older sister. They went on hiatus in 1986 when Heidorn broke his collar bone. They reformed a year later as Uncle Tupelo.

Heidorn left Uncle Tupelo after the recording of their third album, March 16–20, 1992. He intended on leaving the band before the recording of the album but wanted to work with Peter Buck so postponed his departure to the albums release in August. Heidorn left for personal reasons, including distaste of touring and his recent marriage. After the breakup of Uncle Tupelo in 1994, Heidorn joined Jay Farrar in the first lineup of Son Volt, but was not involved in the reformation of the band in 2005 and is no longer active as a professional musician.

== Personal life ==
As of 2003 he had been working for Legal and Business News, a newspaper print in St. Louis since high school.

In 2015, Heidorn and his four siblings, Craig, Carol, Susan and Kelly, started a charity for their father, Leonard "Len" Heidorn who died on December 27, 2014 after suffering a stroke on Christmas eve. They originally wanted to make a non-profit charity around five years earlier when mother Eileen Heidorn had died of cancer in August 2005 aged 66, but with the death of their father decided that now was the time, and created "ElevenEleven Organization", a non-profit organization whose name comes from the date the parents had gotten married, November 11th (11/11) 1958.
