= Greg Kot =

American music journalist and author

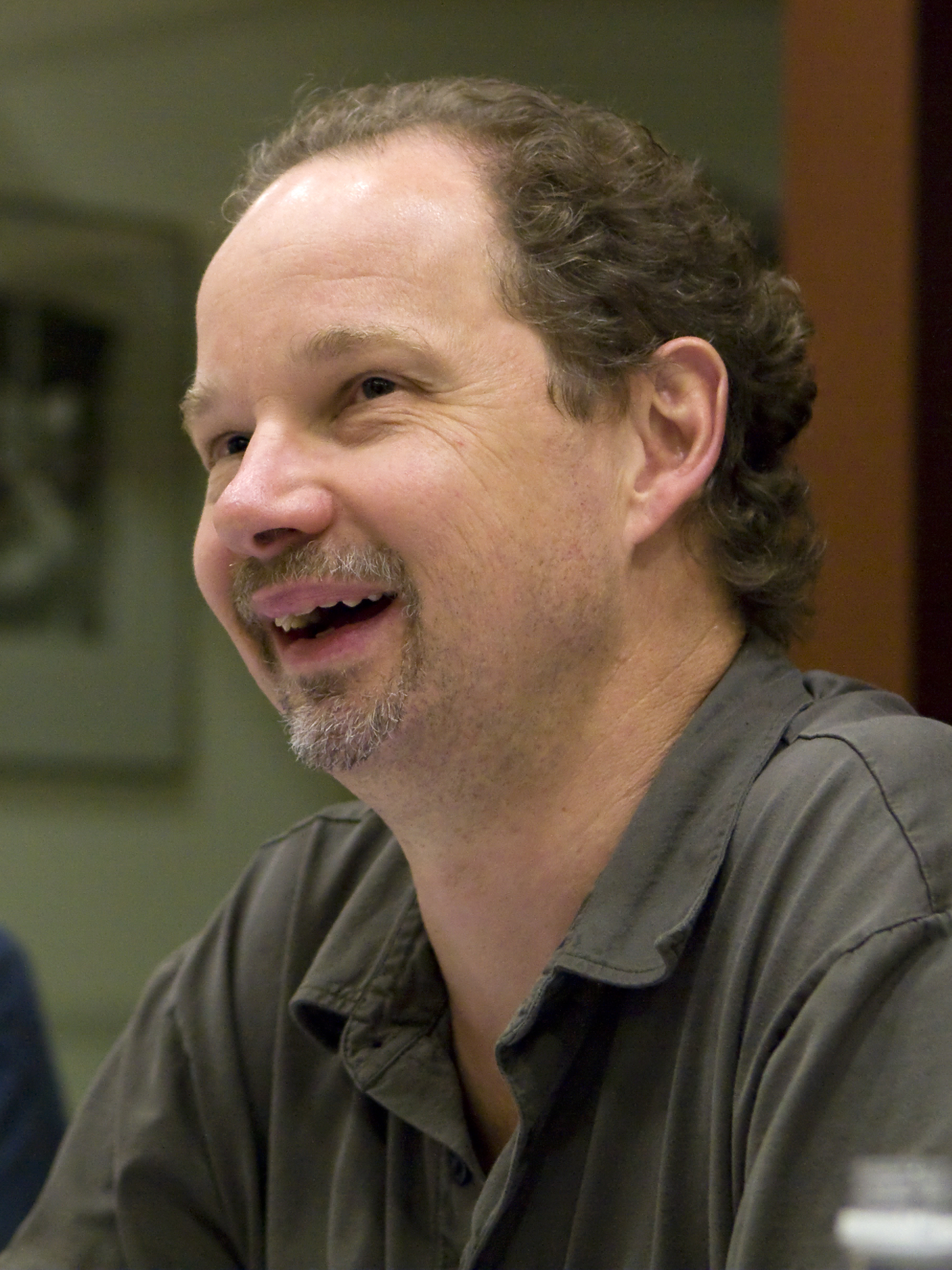
- Kot in 2009
- Born: March 3, 1957 (age 69)
- Occupation: Journalist, author
- Language: English
- Genre: music journalism

Greg Kot (born March 3, 1957) is an American music journalist and author. From 1990 until 2020, Kot was the rock music critic at the Chicago Tribune, where he covered popular music and reported on music-related social, political and business issues. Kot co-hosts the radio program Sound Opinions, which introduces itself as "the world's only rock 'n' roll talk show", nationally syndicated through Chicago Public Radio, WBEZ.

A native of Syracuse, New York, Kot graduated from Marquette University. Kot started his career at the Quad City Times in Davenport, Iowa in June 1978 and then joined the Chicago Tribune in 1980. He was named the paper's rock music critic in 1990, and held that job until taking a buyout from the Tribune in early 2020.

Kot has co-hosted the radio show Sound Opinions since its 1993 launch. The show is syndicated to about 150 radio stations nationwide and also exists as a weekly podcast. In 2020, Chicago's WBEZ terminated its production agreement with Sound Opinions, although the show will continue to be produced independently.

Kot's books include Wilco: Learning How to Die, Ripped: How the Wired Generation Revolutionized Music, and I'll Take You There: Mavis Staples, the Staple Singers and the March up Freedom's Highway. He co-authored The Beatles vs. The Rolling Stones: Sound Opinions on the Great Rock 'n' Roll Rivalry (Voyageur Press) with his Sound Opinions co-host Jim DeRogatis. His music criticism and journalism has appeared in Encyclopædia Britannica, Cash: By the Editors of Rolling Stone, Harrison: A Rolling Stone tribute to George Harrison, The Trouser Press Guide to '90s Rock, The Rolling Stone Album Guide and MusicHound Rock: The Essential Album Guide. A longtime contributor to Rolling Stone, Kot has written for a dozen national publications, including Details, Blender, Entertainment Weekly, Men's Journal, Guitar World, Vibe and Request.

Kot lives on Chicago's Northwest Side and is a longtime youth basketball coach.

== Bibliography ==
- Wilco: Learning How to Die, Broadway Books (June 15, 2004)
- Ripped: How the Wired Generation Revolutionized Music, Scribner (May 19, 2009)
- I'll Take You There: Mavis Staples, the Staple Singers and the March up Freedom's Highway, Scribner (January 21, 2014)

== See also ==
- Album era
- Greg Tate
