= Leroy Bach =

American musician

LeRoy Fredrick Bach is an American musician, composer, and music producer. He has hosted musical gatherings, fostered musical collaborations, and led bands in Chicago since 1990. Bach is perhaps best known for his work as a multi-instrumentalist in the band Wilco from 1997 through 2004.

== Personal life ==
Bach was born in Chicago in 1964. He attended high school in Rockford, Illinois, and spent two years at Berklee College of Music in Boston. From 1986 until 1989 he lived in Champaign, Illinois, then moved to Chicago with founders of the avant-garde silk-screen company Propaganda. Propaganda settled in the Clark and Belmont area, and their live-work space became associated with the area's arts and music counterculture.

== Career ==
=== Early career ===
Bach was a founding member of Sub Pop artists Five Style, circa 1993. From 1995 until 2010 Bach was an employee of the Rainbo Club in Chicago.

=== Wilco: 1997 - 2004 ===
Bach began playing with Wilco in 1997, replacing touring steel guitarist Bob Egan. Bach's work with the band began on tours for Mermaid Avenue; the first album he played on was Summerteeth. He contributed extensively to the albums Yankee Hotel Foxtrot and A Ghost Is Born, playing keyboards, guitar, bass, and saxophone. The group received one Grammy Award and two nominations during Bach's tenure with the band.

In January 2004, Wilco announced via their official website that Bach was no longer a member of the group. The statement continued, "We'll all miss working with him and, of course, wish him the best in what comes next." A source close to the band told Billboard that it was Bach's decision to leave the group. He was replaced by multi-instrumentalists Nels Cline and Pat Sansone.

=== Other musical work: 1991-2008 ===
Bach has played with Joan of Arc, Theaster Gates, Will Oldham, Rob Mazurek, The Autumn Defense, Liz Phair, Beth Orton, Andrew Bird, Iron and Wine, and Dwain Story. He maintained an 18-month residency at the Hideout, in Chicago, with singing partner Edward Burch, and co-produced Sonny Smith's 2006 album Fruitvale. In 2006 Bach was Artist-in-Residence at the Headlands Center for the Arts in California.

=== 2008-present ===
From 2008-2013 Bach collaborated with artist, musician, and urban planner Theaster Gates. In 2009, Bach and Gates set to music the poems of slave potter Dave Drake, which were performed at the Milwaukee Art Museum. Bach performed regularly with Gates' ensemble, The Black Monks of Mississippi, including performances at the 2010 Whitney Biennial and dOCUMENTA (13).

Since 1994 Bach has been a regular collaborator with Chicago poet and songwriter Marvin Tate, producing Tate's 2007 album, The Family Swim, and the 2013 release, "Tim Kinsella sings the songs of Marvin Tate by LeRoy Bach featuring Angel Olsen."

In May 2011 Bach played guitar in the musical, The Shaggs: Philosophy of the World, at Playwrights Horizons, New York. In 2012 he accompanied Emily Bergl during a two-week run at the famed Cafe Carlyle in New York.

Bach was a 2013 artist-in-residence at the University of Chicago. He is a 2014 artist-in-Residence at the Headlands Center for the Arts, as well as the Djerassi Artist Residence Program, and he will serve as 2014/2015 Interpreter-in-Residence at the Smart Museum of Art, University of Chicago.

Bach produced Golden Sings That Have Been Sung (2016) and Deafman Glance (2018) by Ryley Walker.
