= Eveningland =

Studio album by Hem
- Released: October 5, 2004
- Genre: Indie pop/folk music
- Length: 53:19
- Label: Rounder Records

Hem chronology
I'm Talking With My Mouth (2002)	Eveningland (2004)	Birds, Beasts, & Flowers (2004)

Professional ratings
Review scores
Source	Rating
AllMusic	4/5 stars
Pitchfork	8.1/10

Eveningland is the second album by indie folk group Hem. It was released on Rounder Records after a delay caused by the folding of the DreamWorks music division. The album features a cover of Johnny Cash's famous song "Jackson," as well as more orchestral arrangements, a change from the sometimes-stark instrumentation of their previous album, Rabbit Songs.

The album features backing vocal contributions from multi-instrumentalist Dawn Landes on a number of songs, and singer-songwriter Josh Rouse on "Carry Me Home."

"Pacific Street" was used in a season 3 episode of Everwood.

== Track listing ==
All songs written by Dan Messé, except where noted.

1. "The Fire Thief" - 4:07
2. "Lucky" (Messé, Gary Maurer) - 3:49
3. "Receiver" - 4:06
4. "Redwing" - 4:14
5. "My Father’s Waltz" - 2:10
6. "Hollow" (Steve Curtis) - 3:54
7. "A-Hunting We Will Go" (Messé, Curtis) - 4:17
8. "An Easy One" (Messé, Maurer) - 3:10
9. "Strays" - 3:51
10. "Cincinnati Traveler" (Curtis) - 1:02
11. "Jackson" (Billy Edd Wheeler, Jerry Leiber) - 3:32
12. "Dance with Me" (Curtis) - 3:04
13. "The Beautiful Sea" - 2:37
14. "Eveningland" - 1:01
15. "Pacific Street" - 3:10
16. "Carry Me Home" - 5:15

== Personnel ==
- Sally Ellyson - vocals
- Dan Messé - piano, accordion, glockenspiel
- Gary Maurer - guitar, mandolin
- Steve Curtis - guitar, mandolin, banjo, back-up vocals
- Catherine Popper - double bass, back-up vocals
- Mark Brotter - drums
- Bob Hoffnar - pedal steel guitar
- Heather Zimmerman - violin
- Greg Pliska - orchestration
