= Birds, Beasts, and Flowers =

Birds, Beasts, and Flowers can refer to:

- Birds, Beasts and Flowers, a 1923 book of poetry by D. H. Lawrence
- Birds, Beasts, & Flowers (EP), a 2004 split EP by Hem and The Autumn Defense
