= Once Around (album) =

2010 album by The Autumn Defense

Studio album by The Autumn Defense
- Released: 2010
- Genres: Indie rock; indie pop
- Label: Yep Roc Records

The Autumn Defense chronology
| The Autumn Defense (2007) | Once Around (2010) | Fifth (2014) |

Once Around is an album released November 2, 2010 by The Autumn Defense. It is the band's fourth full-length release.

== Track listing ==
1. "Back of My Mind" (Sansone) - 3:12
2. "Allow Me" (Stirratt, Sansone) - 4:21
3. "Tell Me What You Want" (Sansone) - 5:26
4. "Huntington Fair" (Stirratt, Sansone) - 3:38
5. "Once Around" (Sansone) - 6:29
6. "The Rift" (Stirratt) - 3:07
7. "The Swallows of London Town" (Sansone) - 3:26
8. "Step Easy" (Stirratt) - 2:59
9. "Don't Know" (Sansone) - 3:57
10. "Every Day" (Sansone) - 3:37
11. "There Will Always Be a Way" (Sansone, Stirratt) - 4:15

== Personnel ==
The Autumn Defense

- Patrick Sansone - lead vocals (1, 3, 5, 7, 9, 10, 11), backing vocals (2, 6, 8), acoustic guitar (3, 5, 6, 7, 9, 10, 11), electric guitar (1, 3, 5, 7, 8, 10, 11), bass (2, 4, 5, 6, 8, 9, 10), percussion (1, 4, 5, 8, 10), piano (1, 2, 6), celeste (1, 11), Wurlitzer (2), Mellotron (4, 5), 12-string guitar (4, 8), Rhodes (5), marimba (7), glockenspiel (11)
- John Stirratt - lead vocals (2, 4, 6, 8), backing vocals (1, 3, 5, 7, 9, 10, 11), acoustic guitar (2, 4, 5, 6, 8), electric guitar (2), bass (1, 3, 7, 11), synth (6), percussion (8)

Additional Musicians

- Greg Wieczorek - drums (all tracks), percussion (3, 5, 7, 9, 11), backing vocals (11)
- John Pirruccello - slide guitar (1), pedal steel (6, 11)
- Chris Carmichael - violin, viola & cello (2, 4)
- Jonathan Wilson - electric guitar (3)
- Glenn Kotche - triangle (3), percussion (6)
- Brad Jones - bass (5)
- Nick Photinos - cello (5, 7, 10)
