= Fifth (The Autumn Defense album) =

2014 album by The Autumn Defense

Studio album by The Autumn Defense
- Released: January 28, 2014
- Genre: Indie rock
- Length: 46:02
- Label: Yep Roc
- Producers: Pat Sansone, Joshua Shapera

The Autumn Defense chronology
Once Around (2010)	Fifth (2014)	Here and Nowhere (2025)

Professional ratings
Aggregate scores
Source	Rating
Metacritic	67/100
Review scores
Source	Rating
AllMusic	4/5 stars
Blurt Magazine	4/5 stars
Consequence of Sound	C−

Fifth is the fifth studio album by American indie band the Autumn Defense. It was released in January 2014 by Yep Roc Records.

== Track listing ==
All tracks composed by Pat Sansone and John Stirratt; except where indicated

No.	Title	Writer(s)	Length
1.	"None of This Will Matter"		3:43
2.	"This Thing That I've Found"	Pat Sansone	3:28
3.	"I Can See Your Face"		3:59
4.	"I Want You Back"	John Stirratt	4:09
5.	"Calling Your Name"	Pat Sansone	3:24
6.	"Can't Love Anyone Else"	John Stirratt	3:45
7.	"August Song"	Pat Sansone	3:12
8.	"Under the Wheel"	John Stirratt	4:12
9.	"Why Don't We"	Pat Sansone	3:21
10.	"The Light In Your Eyes"		4:30
11.	"Things On My Mind"	Pat Sansone	3:17
12.	"What's It Take"		5:01

== Personnel ==
- John Stirratt - lead and backing vocals, acoustic and electric guitar, bass, keyboards
- Patrick Sansone - lead and backing vocals, acoustic and electric guitar, mellotron, percussion, piano, electric piano, organ, synthesizer, bass
- Greg Wieczorek - drums, percussion
- James Haggerty - bass
- John Pirruccello - electric guitar, slide guitar, baritone guitar, pedal steel
- Laveeta Robinson - backing vocals on "Can't Love Anyone Else"
