= Little Common Twist =

Studio album by Charles Rumback and Ryley Walker
- Released: November 8, 2019
- Recorded: 2016–2017
- Studio: HTF (Chicago)
- Genres: Folk; jazz; ambient
- Length: 40:08
- Label: Thrill Jockey
- Producer: John Hughes

Charles Rumback chronology
Tag Book (2017)	Little Common Twist (2019)	Cadillac Turns (2019)

Ryley Walker chronology
The Lillywhite Sessions (2018)	Little Common Twist (2019)	Deep Fried Grandeur (2021)

Little Common Twist is a collaborative album by American musicians Charles Rumback and Ryley Walker. Their second album together (after 2016's Cannots), it was released on November 8, 2019, through Thrill Jockey. The album was recorded over various sessions in 2016 and 2017 at HTF Studios and was produced by John Hughes.

Little Common Twist has received positive reviews from critics, being compared favorably to Rumback and Walker's previous collaboration, and being noted for its melding of various genres including folk, jazz, and ambient.

== Reception ==
Writing for PopMatters, Chris Ingalls gave the album a rating of 8 out of 10, calling it an album full of "beautiful, meditative sounds that veer somewhere between folk, jazz, and edgier, more organic forms of the ambient genre." Josiah Nelson of Exclaim! also rated the album 8 out of 10 and described its music as "contemplative, imbibing a posture of serenity that's compatible with urgency, but not with anxiety." Fred Thomas of AllMusic found the album to be "more focused and less aggressive" than Cannots (2016), Rumback's and Walker's previous collaboration, noting the increased emphasis on fingerstyle guitar and "stylistic diversity."

== Track listing ==
Little Common Twist
No.	Title	Length
1.	"Half Joking"	4:27
2.	"Half Blind Sun"	4:23
3.	"Idiot Parade"	4:40
4.	"And You, These Sang"	4:03
5.	"Menebhi"	5:04
6.	"Ill-Fitting / No Sickness"	4:20
7.	"If You're Around and Down"	8:24
8.	"Worn and Held"	4:47
Total length:		40:08

== Personnel ==
Musicians

- Charles Rumback – drums
- Ryley Walker – guitar
- John Hughes – synths, electronics
- Nick Macri – bass (3)

Technical

- John Hughes – recording, mixing
- Heba Kadry – mixing
- Carl Rowatti – lacquer cutting

Packaging

- Adam Francis Scott – cover painting ("Yucca")
- Shelia Sachs – design
