= Sad Eyed Lady of the Lowlands =

1966 song by Bob Dylan

"Sad-Eyed Lady of the Lowlands"

Song by Bob Dylan

from the album Blonde on Blonde
- Released: June 20, 1966
- Recorded: February 16, 1966
- Studio: Columbia Studio A (Nashville, Tennessee)
- Length: 11:23
- Label: Columbia
- Songwriter: Bob Dylan
- Producer: Bob Johnston

Audio
- "Sad Eyed Lady of the Lowlands" on YouTube

"Sad Eyed Lady of the Lowlands" is a song by the American singer-songwriter Bob Dylan. First released as the final track on Dylan's seventh studio album, Blonde on Blonde (1966), the song lasts 11 minutes and 23 seconds, and occupies the entire fourth side of the double album. The song was written by Dylan and produced by Bob Johnston. The recording session began at 6 pm on February 15, 1966, at Columbia Studio A, Nashville, Tennessee, but Dylan worked on the lyrics for several hours while the experienced Nashville session musicians hired to accompany him stood by. Four takes were recorded in the early hours of February 16; the final recording was released on Blonde on Blonde. The music is a waltz in 6/8 time.

Some writers have concluded that the song refers to Joan Baez, although most agree that it was composed for Dylan's wife Sara Lownds. Dylan refers to writing the song for his wife in his track "Sara" (1975). Commentators have pointed to literary allusions in "Sad Eyed Lady of the Lowlands" which include William Blake's 1794 poem "The Tyger", Algernon Swinburne's 1866 poem "Dolores", and verses of the Bible.

Dylan's lyrics polarized critics. On its release, several reviewers found them impenetrable, but rated the song favorably. Later writers often agree with this, praising the sound, dismissing the lyrics, and rating the song as amongst Dylan's best work.

Dylan has never performed the song in concert. It has been covered by a variety of artists, including Baez, on Any Day Now (1968), and Richie Havens, on Mixed Bag II (1974). Dylan's version has been cited as an influence by the former Pink Floyd bassist and songwriter Roger Waters, and George Harrison wrote that the track influenced aspects of the Beatles song "Long, Long, Long".

== Background and recording ==
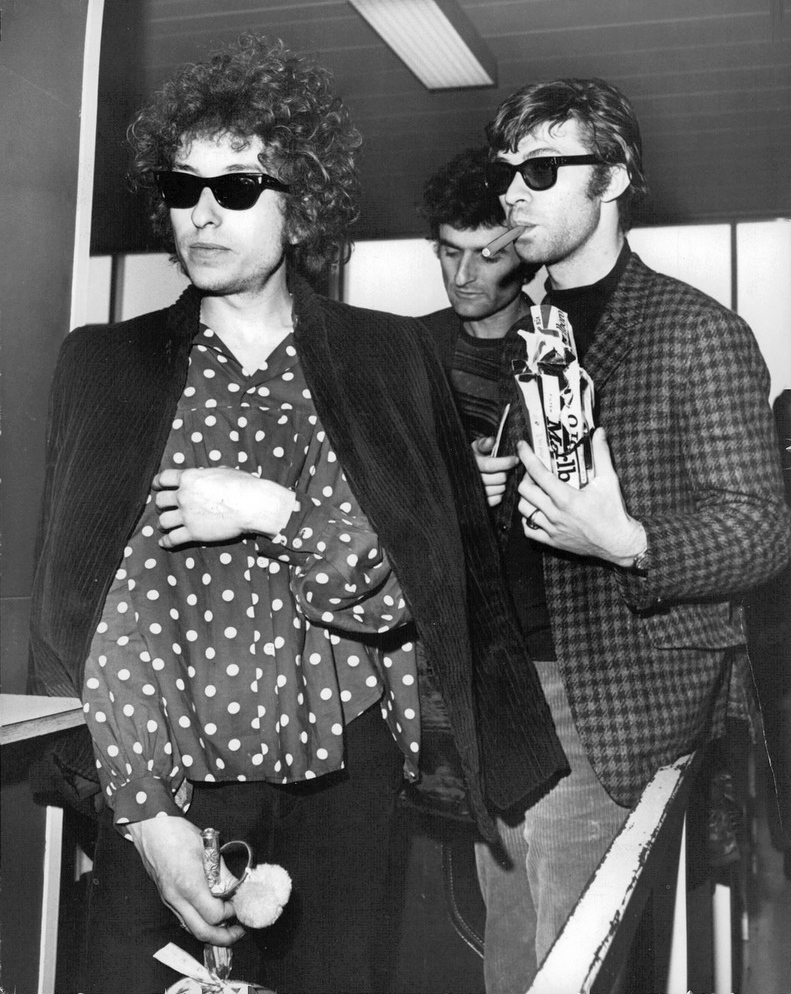
Bob Dylan (left) with his tour manager Victor Maymudes (center) and Robbie Robertson in Sweden in April 1966, between the recording and release of "Sad Eyed Lady of the Lowlands"

Bob Dylan began to record his seventh studio album, Blonde on Blonde, in New York in October 1965. Frustrated by slow progress in the studio, Dylan agreed to the suggestion of his producer Bob Johnston and moved to Columbia Studio A on Music Row, Nashville, Tennessee, in February 1966. Bringing with him Robbie Robertson on guitar and Al Kooper on keyboard, Dylan commenced recording with experienced Nashville session players.

On February 15, following the move to Nashville, a session began at 6 pm, but Dylan simply sat in the studio working on his lyrics, while the musicians played ping-pong and chatted. Dylan's biographer Clinton Heylin described Dylan writing the song across three recording sessions that had been booked; guitarist Charlie McCoy later recalled that it was unprecedented for him and the other musicians to be booked and paid for their time but not play. Finally, at 4 am, Dylan called the musicians in and outlined the structure of the song. Dylan counted off and the musicians attempted his composition, "Sad Eyed Lady of the Lowlands". Drummer Kenny Buttrey recalled that after the second chorus, "everybody's just peaking it up 'cause we thought, Man, this is it ... This is gonna be the last chorus and we've gotta put everything into it we can. And he played another harmonica solo and went back down to another verse", meaning that the group had to revert to a less intense style. Several minutes later into the song, Buttrey said he was thinking, "... we peaked five minutes ago. Where do we go from here?"

Four takes of the song were recorded, three of which were complete. The first-take version lasted 10 minutes and seven seconds. After an incomplete take two, used to familiarise the musicians with the intended tempo, the third take was just over 12 minutes long. The fourth take clocked in at 11 minutes, 23 seconds, and would occupy the entire fourth side of the double album. The Dylan scholar Michael Gray writes that for the first verse, only the opening line of the album version was significantly different from the first-take lyrics, which started with "With your mercury eyes in the months that climb". (Note: Gray comments that for "Sad Eyed Lady of the Lowlands", as with other Dylan songs, the lyrics on the official website differ from "the words we all hear on the albums.") He regards the other lyrical changes between different takes as minor. Daryl Sanders, author of a 2020 book about the making of Blonde on Blonde, remarks that several people present at the studio "have remembered recording 'Sad Eyed Lady of the Lowlands' in one take, and that has become part of the mythology surrounding the song".

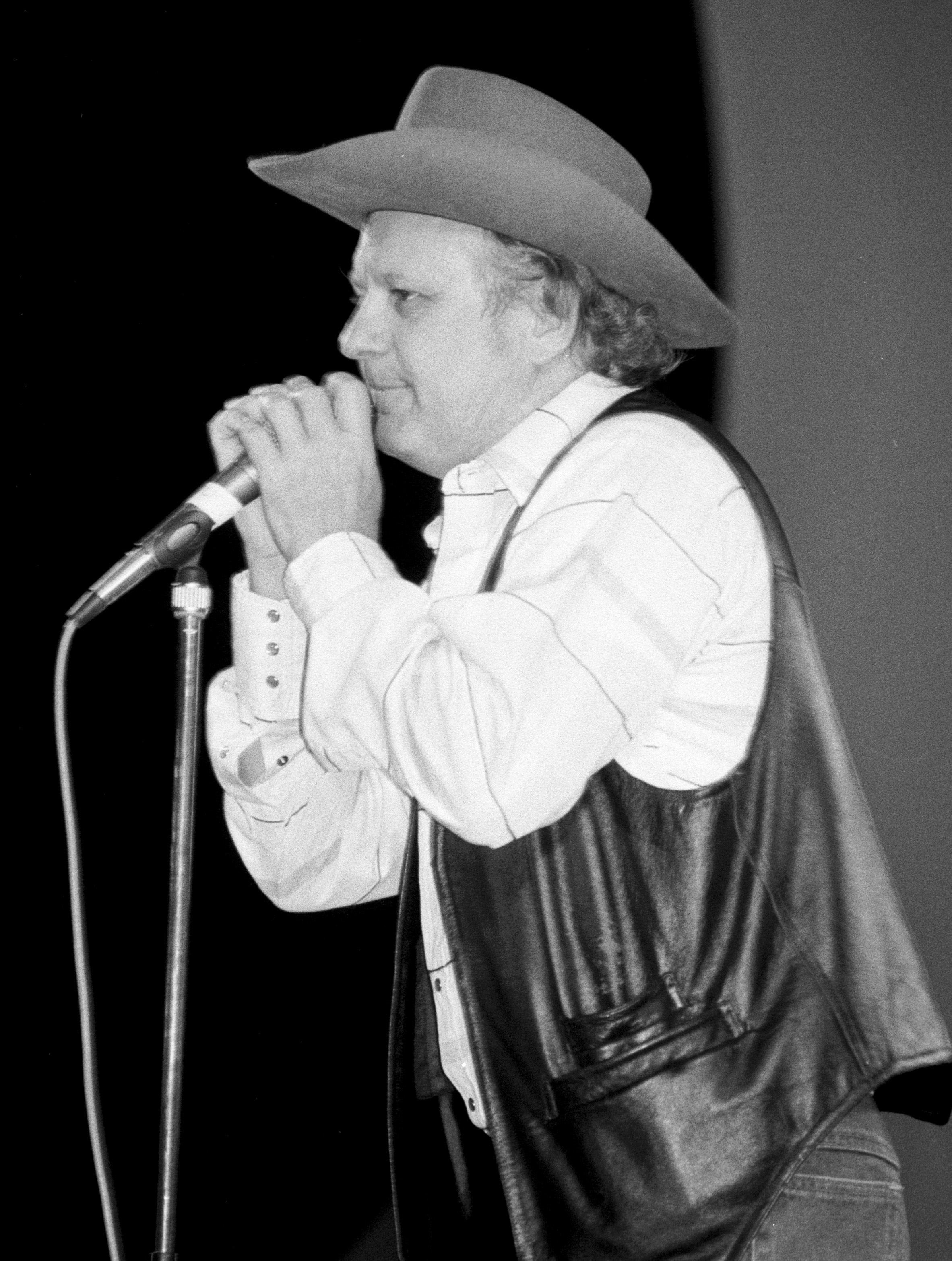
Charlie McCoy (pictured in 1990) later recalled that "We came in at two, and he started to write the song, and four a.m. the next morning he said, 'Okay, I'm ready to record.' After you've tried to stay awake 'til four o'clock in the morning, to play something so slow and long was really, really tough."

The song was released on Blonde on Blonde on June 20, 1966. The recording session was released in its entirety on the 18-disc Collector's Edition of The Bootleg Series Vol. 12: The Cutting Edge 1965–1966 in 2015, with the first take of the song also appearing on the six-disc version of that album.

When Dylan played the song to his biographer Robert Shelton, shortly after recording it, he claimed it was the best song that he had ever composed. Around the same time, Dylan played the as-yet-unreleased album track with journalist Jules Siegel present, describing it as "old-time religious carnival music". Siegel described Dylan as excited by his own track. In 1969, Dylan related to Rolling Stone editor Jann Wenner, "I just sat down at a table and started writing ... And I just got carried away with the whole thing ... I just started writing and I couldn't stop. After a period of time, I forgot what it was all about, and I started trying to get back to the beginning."

The music is a waltz in 6/8 time. The music critic Alex Ross wrote that the refrain [is] a rising and descending arc, made up of successive notes in D-major. Both the song and the album contain musical and thematic influences from country music. The music scholar Keith Negus wrote that the "timbre of the vocals, the texture of the instruments, [and] the ballad style" on the album are reminiscent of country music, particularly on "Sad Eyed Lady of the Lowlands", "Visions of Johanna" and "One of Us Must Know (Sooner or Later)". Negus describes the song's structure as five cycles each of two verses followed by a chorus, with "musical components that ... can be represented as [a a b a a b c c d e e]".

Each verse consists of a list of the sad-eyed lady's attributes, complemented by a sequence of rhetorical questions about the Lady which are never answered within the song. Thus, the first verse begins:

With your mercury mouth in the missionary times
And your eyes like smoke and your prayers like rhymes
And your silver cross, and your voice like chimes
Oh, who do they think could bury you?

The critic Ian Bell contends that people who "say that 'Sad Eyed Lady of the Lowlands' is a mere jumble of images miss a poet attempting, in the ancient manner, to count the ways of love ... and to put the mystery of inviolability and passion into words."

== Critical comments ==
=== Subject ===
Critics generally agreed that Dylan wrote "Sad Eyed Lady of the Lowlands" about his wife, Sara, and some have remarked on the similarity of "Lowlands" to "Lownds", Sara's previous surname. Shelton wrote that "Sad Eyed Lady of the Lowlands" was a "wedding song" for Sara Lownds, whom Dylan had married on November 22, 1965, only three months prior to recording the song. Heard by some listeners as a hymn to an other-worldly woman, for Shelton "her travails seem beyond endurance, yet she radiates an inner strength, an ability to be re-born. This is Dylan at his most romantic." Sara's maiden name was Shirley Noznisky; her father, Isaac Noznisky, was a scrap metal dealer in Wilmington, Delaware. Critics have suggested a link between "sheet metal memories of Cannery Row" and the business of Sara's father, as well as the quote "with your sheets like metal and your belts like lace". Similarly the line "your magazine husband who one day just had to go" could be a reference to Sara's first husband, the magazine photographer Hans Lownds.

In "Sara", a song Dylan wrote and recorded in 1975, he gave another account of the origin of "Sad-Eyed Lady of the Lowlands", singing:

Stayin' up for days in the Chelsea Hotel,
Writin' "Sad Eyed Lady of the Lowlands" for you.

The couple had lived in the Chelsea Hotel in 1965. In his 2009 book Bob Dylan in America, historian Sean Wilentz comments that "Sara" appears to be an insincere attempt at reconciliation after the couple had split, with the lines from the later song giving the impression that Dylan "thought he was handing her some kind of trophy, by telling the whole world that she alone was the muse behind his masterpiece". Lester Bangs provided a hostile critique of the recording in his review of Dylan's 1976 album Desire. Noting Dylan's claims in "Sara" to have written "Sad Eyed Lady of the Lowlands" in the Chelsea Hotel, Bangs remarked that he had been reliably informed that Dylan had composed the song "wired out of his skull in the studio, just before the songs were recorded ... Those lyrics were a speed trip, and if he really did spend days on end sitting in the Chelsea Hotel sweating over lines like 'your streetcar visions which you place on the grass', then he is stupider than we ever gave him credit for."

According to The Band's guitarist Robbie Robertson, the lyric "Arabian drums" originated as an inside joke after Dylan had gifted Sara a pair of "Arabian goggles" the night before. The line was adapted into the song using the band's slang term "drums" to bypass potential record label censorship.

Joan Baez has sometimes been suggested as the song's subject; Baez herself thought that the song was about her; since 1959 she had included a song called "Lowlands" in her repertoire, and her version was included on the album Folksingers 'Round Harvard Square (1959). The Canadian poet Stephen Scobie argues that this potential link contributes to a case for the song being about Baez, but concludes that it is not possible to be sure about who Dylan refers to in the song.

=== Literary allusions ===
Wilentz, discussing the song, comments that Dylan's writing had shifted from the days when he asked questions and supplied answers in the traditional folk-ballad idiom. Like the verses of William Blake's "The Tyger", Dylan asks a series of questions about the sad-eyed lady but never supplies any answers.

Who gave thee thy wisdom? what stories
That stung thee, what visions that smote?
Wert thou pure and a maiden, Dolores,
When desire took thee first by the throat?

Algernon Swinburne, "Dolores", ll. 41–44; cited in Ricks (2004)

Who among them do they think could carry you?
...Who among them can think he could outguess you?
...But who among them really wants just to kiss you?
...Who among them do you think could resist you?

Lines from "Sad Eyed Lady of the Lowlands"; cited in Ricks (2004)

The literary critic Christopher Ricks compares both the imagery and the meter of "Sad Eyed Lady of the Lowlands" to a poem by Algernon Swinburne, "Dolores", published in 1866. Ricks describes Swinburne's poem as an "anti-prayer to his anti-madonna, an interrogation that hears no need why it should ever end". Ricks writes that "Dolores moves ... 'To a tune that enthralls and entices', as does 'Sad Eyed Lady of the Lowlands'." Ricks makes the point that "Sad Eyed Lady of the Lowlands" lists attributes in the same way that "Dolores" does. Ricks describes the way in which Dylan's song attributes so many objects and qualities to the sad-eyed lady as "part inventory, part arsenal, these returns of phrases are bound by awe of her and by suspicion of her".

Throughout his career, Dylan has referenced biblical language, imagery and characters in his songs. The mention of "kings of Tyrus" suggests to Scobie and Ricks that the Book of Ezekiel is alluded to. Scobie argues that Ezekiel is associated with denouncing Tyrus more than other prophets are, and Ricks considers that based on a selection of verses, Ezekiel must be the "sad-eyed prophet", particularly as he is unable to cry. The phrase "no man" is repeated in both the song's chorus, in "Where the sad eyed prophet says that no man comes", and several times in the biblical book. Tyrus is described in Ezekiel as "a merchant of the people for many isles"; this chapter of Ezekiel lists many commodities and luxuries which Tyrus trades in, including tin, iron, silver, honey, emeralds, wine, and spices. Thus, for Ricks, Tyrus is "one huge warehouse of hubris", perhaps hinted at by the "warehouse eyes" in Dylan's song. The repeated mention of gates in the song may reference a phrase from Ezekiel: "This gate shall be shut, it shall not be opened, and no man shall enter in by it." Gray argues that the Book of Ezekiel influenced the language of several of Dylan's songs, including "Gates of Eden" (1965), "Angelina" (1981), and "Dignity" (1989).

=== Favorable responses ===
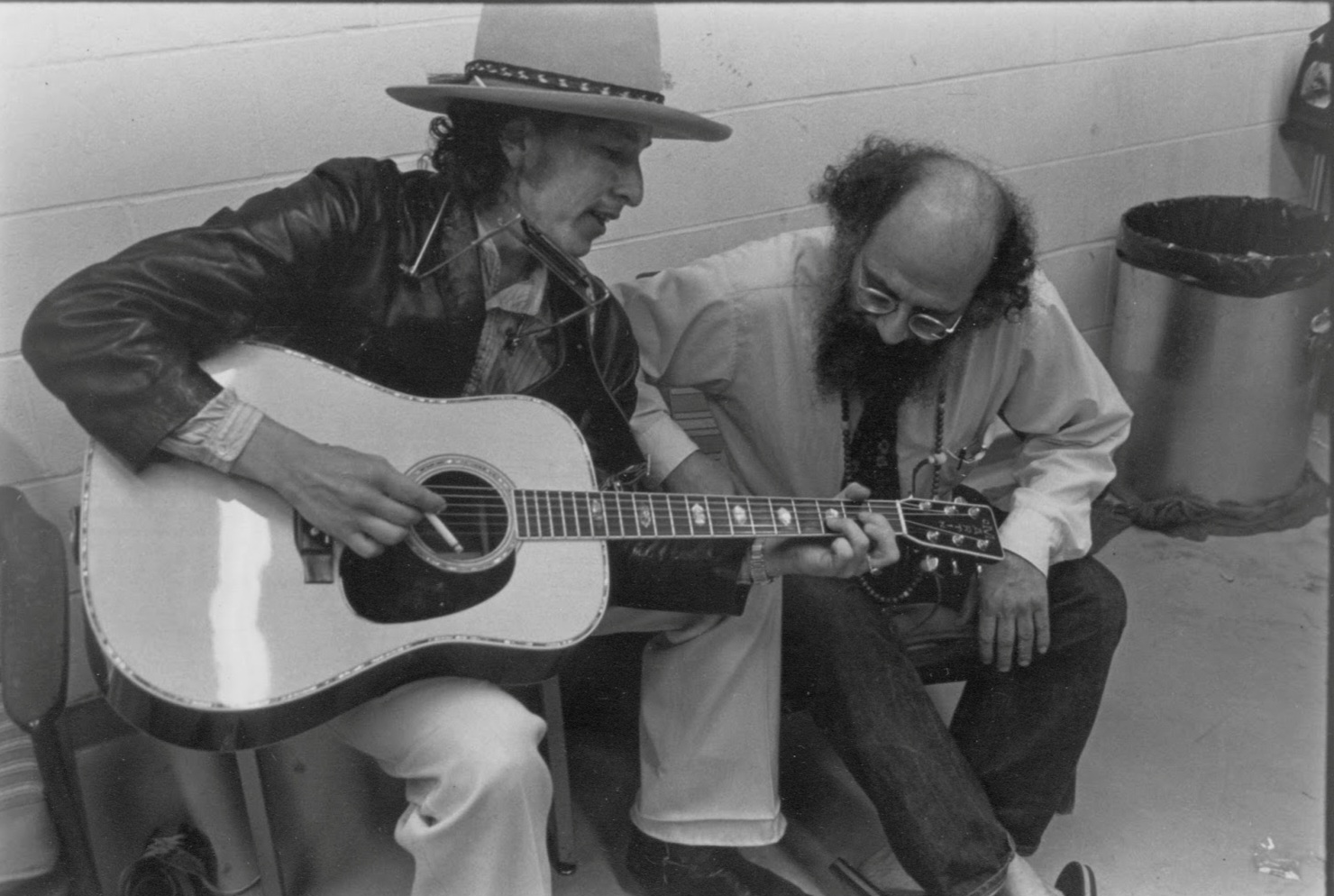
Poet Allen Ginsberg (right), pictured with Dylan in 1973, thought "Sad Eyed Lady of the Lowlands" was "a good poem all by itself".

Several contemporary reviewers found the lyrics of "Sad Eyed Lady of the Lowlands" impenetrable, but still reviewed the track favorably. Ralph Gleason wrote in the San Francisco Examiner that "Sad Eyed Lady of the Lowlands" was "a ghostly enigma". He reported that the Beat poet Allen Ginsberg had said the song stood independently as a good poem, which Gleason called a top-tier commendation. The Village Voice critic Richard Goldstein found that "all that is necessary to appreciate the willowy beauty of its lyrics is to think closely of a personal sad-eyed lady and let the images do the rest", and The Boston Globe reviewer Ernie Santosuosso commented that "It's Dylan at his most esoteric best in this wailing tribute filled with sense-boggling word figures." The song was described in Melody Maker as "an appealing hymnic chant" on a par with the best of Dylan's recent work.

In a later review, the critic Andy Gill feels the work, recorded in the early hours of the morning, has a nocturnal quality similar to "Visions of Johanna". Al Kooper, who played organ on the track, agreed, describing the song in a 2005 interview with Mojo magazine as "the definitive version of what 4 am sounds like". Gill comments on the "measured grace and stately pace" of the song's rhythm, characterizing the mood of the song as being as much like music for a funeral as for a wedding. Gill remarks that although the song contains a lot of enigmatic imagery, it lacks the jokey nihilism that characterizes much of the rest of Blonde on Blonde. The musicologist Wilfrid Mellers argues that Sad Eyed Lady of the Lowlands stands with "Mr. Tambourine Man" as one of the "most insidiously haunting pop songs of our time". Mellers claims that Dylan has succeeded in concentrating contradictory qualities into the Lady, remarking that it is impossible to assess "whether the Lady is a creature of dream or nightmare; but she's beyond good and evil". He contends that "the song even erases Time ... it enters a mythological once-upon-a-time where the clock doesn't tick". For Paul Williams, the song is not typical of Dylan's canon as the melody initially draws the listener's attention, rather than the lyrics. Williams opines that the song "has an almost unearthly beauty".

In his book Bob Dylan's Poetics: How the Songs Work, historian and literature scholar Timothy Hampton comments that Dylan's delivery of the track's chorus creates a sense of distance between singer and audience. He adds that this was a technique employed on several Blonde on Blonde tracks. Hampton notes that Dylan sings ahead of the beat; thus, making it difficult to sing in time with him. Scobie praises Dylan's delivery, giving the example of the relatively "prosaic and drab" written lyric "And you wouldn't know it would happen like this", which "soars" when sung by Dylan. In 1981, the literature scholar David Pichaske wrote that "Sad Eyed Lady of the Lowlands" was one of Dylan's most widely applauded songs, although all efforts to explain its appeal had been found wanting; he noted the use of alliteration and assonance in the song, and suggested that the sound of the track might be more important than the imagery in it. In 1969, Williams had made similar comments, writing that he found the song affecting, despite being unable to decipher the lyrics, and that while he could appreciate the song on an emotional level, he was unable to articulate why.

The song has received praise from other commentators who have assessed the track against others in Dylan's oeuvre. Jim Beviglia rated the song as Dylan's best in his 2013 book Counting Down Bob Dylan: His 100 Finest Songs, referring to it as the best love song of all time and considering it the prime example of Dylan's combination of words and music, and performance. In 2015, the song was ranked 27th on Rolling Stone's "100 Greatest Bob Dylan Songs". In a 2020 article for The Guardian, Alexis Petridis ranked it the ninth-greatest of Dylan's songs, and felt that "its understated sound, cyclical melody and devotional lyrics" provided persuasive evidence that the track was a "masterpiece".

=== Negative and ambivalent responses ===
The Variety review of Blonde on Blonde in 1966 noted that "Sad Eyed Lady of the Lowlands" had a side of the double album to itself, and called it "one of [Dylan's] more pretentious poetic flights, which in this case is an imposition on the patience of his most dedicated fans". Six years later, the broadcaster, writer, and critic Clive James wrote that Dylan's "unstable sense of organization is most readily noticeable in the long songs that don't justify their length", citing "Sad Eyed Lady of the Lowlands" as an example, and complaining that the album was effectively three sides long rather than four.

Some later commentaries have been critical of the song's lyrics while praising the music or performance. The cultural critic Paul Morley comments that opinions on "Sad Eyed Lady of the Lowlands" ranged from it being the finest love song of all time to it being an overambitious caricature of a love song. Ross argued that the lyrics of "Sad Eyed Lady of the Lowlands" become increasingly hard to fathom, writing that in the second-to-last verse, Dylan's meaning clouds over: "'They wished you'd accepted the blame for the farm.' What farm? What happened to it? Why would she be to blame for it?" Ross further interrogates Dylan's imagery, asking:

What are "warehouse eyes", and how can one leave them by a gate? ... But the music makes you forget them. The melody of the refrain—a rising and descending scale, as in "Danny Boy"—is grand to begin with, but in the fifth verse Dylan makes it grander. As the band keeps playing the scale, he skates back up to the top D with each syllable."

Heylin, like the Variety review, has described "Sad Eyed Lady of the Lowlands" as "pretentious", but also as "a captivating carousel of a performance". He suggests that Dylan was driven to create a song that would reach a new level of writing and performance. Heylin quotes from Dylan's San Francisco press conference on December 3, 1965, when he stated he was interested in:

... writing [a] symphony ... with different melodies and different words, different ideas ... which just roll on top of each other ... the end result being a total[ity] ... They say my songs are long now. Some time [I'm] just gonna come up with one that's gonna be the whole album."

The Dylan scholar Michael Gray changed his opinion of "Sad Eyed Lady of the Lowlands". In the 1972 edition of his book Song & Dance Man: The Art of Bob Dylan, Gray concludes that the song is "unsuccessful, and rather grandly so, inasmuch as it is offered on the album, as something of extraspecial importance, and yet no one, subsequently, has, after any thought, really accepted it as such." In a footnote to this passage, written for the 2000 edition of his book, Gray remarked that he felt "embarrassed" at his earlier assessment, adding that although the song's lyrics were flawed, "the recording itself, capturing at its absolute peak Dylan's incomparable capacity for intensity of communication, is a masterpiece if ever there was one."

== Live performances and legacy ==
Dylan has never performed the song in concert, although during the "Woman In White" sequence of Dylan's film Renaldo and Clara, a live performance can be heard in the background. Dylan, accompanied by Scarlet Rivera on violin, Rob Stoner on bass, and Howie Wyeth on drums, recorded this version at a rehearsal during the Rolling Thunder Revue in 1975.

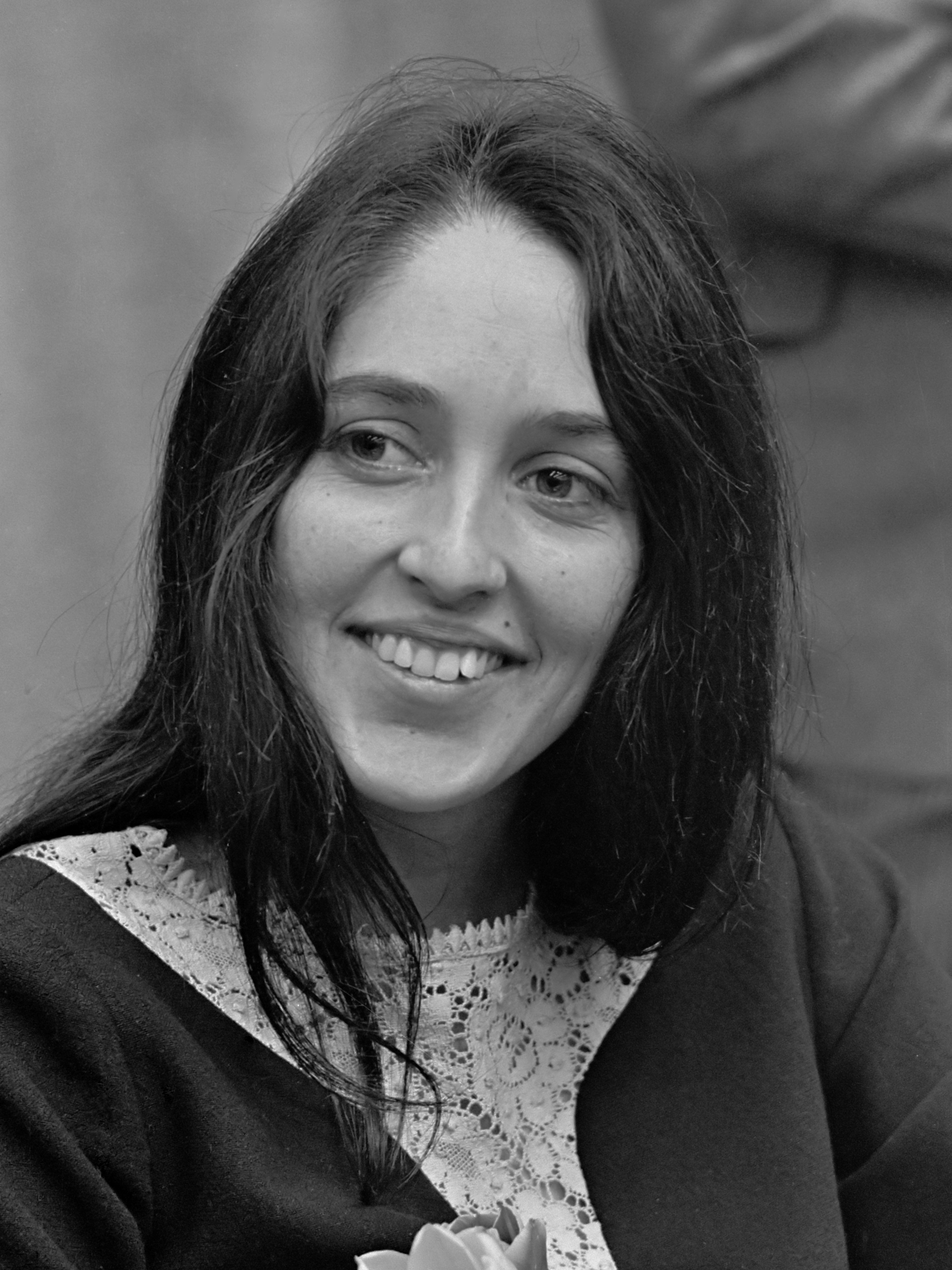
Joan Baez (pictured in 1966) covered "Sad Eyed Lady of the Lowlands", which some people thought was about her, for her 1968 album Any Day Now.

Baez covered the song for her 1968 album Any Day Now. Harper Barnes of the St. Louis Post-Dispatch felt that "without apparent narcissism, [Baez] beautifully sustains 'Sad Eyed Lady of the Lowlands' for more than 11 minutes." It was less well received by Raymond Lowery of The News and Observer, who found it "interminable".

Richie Havens included a seven-minute version on his 1974 album Mixed Bag II, which was described by Joe Sornberger of the Edmonton Journal as an "upbeat, almost funky love tribute" that kept the spirit of the original despite being much shorter than Dylan's original.

The French alternative rock band Phoenix recorded a live, five-minute acoustic cover for the German magazine Musikexpress that Rolling Stone reviewer Daniel Kreps felt was true to the original despite the reduced duration. Similarly, Kevin Richards in American Songwriter wrote that it retained the "wistful melancholy" of Dylan's version.

A version by the Old Crow Medicine Show was described as "mid-tempo ... almost celebratory" by Wayne Bledsoe in the Knoxville News Sentinel.

Andrew Stafford of The Guardian felt that Emma Swift's cover on her 2020 album Blonde on the Tracks was consistently elegant. Conversely, Hal Horowitz in American Songwriter wrote that her rendition, lacking the compelling musical accompaniment of the Blonde on Blonde version, became rather dull.

Cover versions of "Sad Eyed Lady of the Lowlands"
Artist	Release	Year	Approximate length
Joan Baez	Any Day Now	1968	11:18
Richie Havens	Mixed Bag II	1974	7:52
Phoenix	For Musikexpress magazine	2010	Nearly 5 minutes
Old Crow Medicine Show	50 Years of Blonde on Blonde	2017	9:27
Emma Swift	Blonde on the Tracks	2020	11:57

In his 1980 autobiography, I, Me, Mine, George Harrison says that the song's chord changes influenced the music of his Beatles song "Long, Long, Long", which he wrote and recorded in October 1968 for the album The Beatles, also known as "The White Album". Harrison wrote: "I can't recall much about it except the chords, which I think were coming from 'Sad Eyed Lady of the Lowlands' – D to E minor, A, and D – those three chords and the way they moved."

Tom Waits said of "Sad Eyed Lady of the Lowlands" in 1991: "It is like Beowulf ... This song can make you leave home, work on the railroad or marry a Gypsy. I think of a drifter around a fire with a tin cup under a bridge remembering a woman's hair. The song is a dream, a riddle and a prayer."

In a radio interview with broadcaster Howard Stern in January 2012, former Pink Floyd songwriter Roger Waters said, "'Sad Eyed Lady of the Lowlands' changed my life ... When I heard that, I thought, 'If Bob can do it, I can do it' ... it's a whole album side! And it in no way gets dull or boring. It becomes more and more hypnotic."

== Personnel ==
Album credits according to Daryl Sanders (musicians) and Richard Buskin (technical):

Performers

- Bob Dylan – vocals, acoustic guitar, harmonica
- Hargus "Pig" Robbins – piano
- Al Kooper – organ
- Charlie McCoy – acoustic guitar
- Wayne Moss – acoustic guitar
- Joe South – electric bass
- Kenny Buttrey – drums

Technical

- Bob Johnston – record producer
- Neil Wilburn – engineer
- Mike Figlio – engineer

== Book sources ==
- Bangs, Lester (1990) [1976]. "Bob Dylan's Dalliance with Mafia Chic". In Thomson, Elizabeth (ed.). The Dylan Companion. Macmillan London Limited. pp. 210–222. ISBN 978-0-333-49826-2.
- Bell, Ian (2012). Once Upon A Time: The Lives of Bob Dylan. Mainstream Publishing. ISBN 978-1-78057-573-5.
- Beviglia, Jim (2013). Counting Down Bob Dylan: His 100 Finest Songs. Scarecrow Press. ISBN 978-0-8108-8824-1.
- Buskin, Richard (2012). Classic Tracks: The Real Stories Behind 68 Seminal Recordings. Sample Magic. ISBN 978-0-9564460-2-2.
- Dylan, Bob (2004). Bob Dylan: Lyrics, 1962–2001. Simon & Schuster. ISBN 978-0-7432-2827-5.
- Everett, Walter (1999). The Beatles as Musicians : Revolver Through the Anthology. Oxford University Press. ISBN 978-0-19-512941-0.
- Gill, Andy (1998). Classic Bob Dylan: My Back Pages. Carlton. ISBN 978-1-85868-599-1.
- Gray, Michael (1972). Song & Dance Man: The Art of Bob Dylan. E.P. Dutton. ISBN 978-0-525-20685-9.
- Gray, Michael (2000). Song & Dance Man III: The Art of Bob Dylan. Continuum International Publishing Group. ISBN 978-0-8264-5150-7.
- Gray, Michael (2006). The Bob Dylan Encyclopedia. Continuum International Publishing Group. ISBN 978-0-8264-6933-5.
- Gray, Michael (2021). "The Cutting Edge, the Sad-Eyed Ladies". Outtakes On Bob Dylan: Selected Writings 1967-2021. Route Publishing. pp. 230–243. ISBN 978-1-901927-86-3.
- Hampton, Timothy (2020). Bob Dylan: How the Songs Work (Kindle ed.). Princeton University Press. ISBN 978-1-942130-36-9.
- Heylin, Clinton (2003). Bob Dylan: Behind the Shades Revisited. Perennial Currents. ISBN 978-0-06-052569-9.
- Heylin, Clinton (2009). Revolution In The Air: The Songs of Bob Dylan, Volume One: 1957–73. Constable & Robinson. ISBN 978-1-84901-051-1.
- Heylin, Clinton (2017). Judas!. Lesser Gods. ISBN 978-1-944713-30-0.
- Heylin, Clinton (2021). The Double Life of Bob Dylan. Vol. 1 1941-1966, A restless, hungry feeling. The Bodley Head. ISBN 978-1-84792-588-6.
- James, Clive (2004) [1972]. "Bringing Some Of It Back Home". In Hedin, Benjamin (ed.). Studio A: The Bob Dylan Reader. W. W. Norton & Company. pp. 98–108. ISBN 978-0-393-32742-7.
- Mai, Ann-Marie (2021). "13: World Literature". In Latham, Sean (ed.). The World of Bob Dylan (PDF) (Kindle ed.). Cambridge University Press. pp. 158–168. doi:10.1017/9781108583398. ISBN 978-1-108-58339-8. S2CID 240898173.
- Margotin, Philippe; Guesdon, Jean-Michel (2022). Bob Dylan All the Songs: The Story Behind Every Track (Expanded ed.). Black Dog & Leventhal. ISBN 978-0-7624-7573-5.
- Mellers, Wilfrid (1972). "Bob Dylan: Freedom and Responsibility". In McGregor, Craig (ed.). Bob Dylan: The Early Years: A Retrospective. William Morrow and Company. pp. 398–407. ISBN 978-0-688-06025-1.
- Morley, Paul (2022) [2021]. You Lose Yourself, You Reappear: Bob Dylan and the Voices of a Lifetime. Simon & Schuster. ISBN 978-1-4711-9517-4.
- Negus, Keith (2008). Bob Dylan. Equinox. ISBN 978-1-904768-25-8.
- Pichaske, David R. (1981) [1972]. Beowulf to Beatles & Beyond: the Varieties of Poetry. Macmillan. ISBN 978-0-02-395380-4.
- Ricks, Christopher (2003). Dylan's Visions of Sin. Viking. ISBN 978-0-670-80133-6.
- Ross, Alex (2011). Listen To This. Picador. ISBN 978-0-312-61068-5.
- Sanders, Daryl (2020). That Thin, Wild Mercury Sound: Dylan, Nashville, and the Making of Blonde on Blonde (epub ed.). Chicago Review Press. ISBN 978-1-61373-550-3.
- Scobie, Stephen (1991). Alias Bob Dylan. Red Deer Press. ISBN 978-0-88995-069-6.
- Shelton, Robert (2011). No Direction Home: The Life and Music of Bob Dylan (The Acclaimed Biography). Hal Leonard Corporation. ISBN 978-1-61713-012-0.
- Sounes, Howard (2001). Down the Highway: The Life of Bob Dylan. Grove Press. ISBN 978-0-8021-1686-4.
- Spargo, R. Clifton; Ream, Anne K. (2009). "Bob Dylan and Religion". In Dettmar, Kevin J. H. (ed.). The Cambridge Companion to Bob Dylan. Cambridge University Press. pp. 87–99. ISBN 978-0-521-88694-9.
- Strong, Martin C. (2010). The Great Folk Discography. Vol. 1: Pioneers and Early Legends. Birlinn. ISBN 978-1-84697-141-9.
- Trager, Oliver (2004). Keys to the Rain: the Definitive Bob Dylan Encyclopedia. Billboard Books. ISBN 978-0-8230-7974-2.
- Unterberger, Richie (2002). Turn! Turn! Turn! : the '60s Folk-rock Revolution. Backbeat Books. ISBN 978-0-87930-703-5.
- Wilentz, Sean (2009). Bob Dylan In America. The Bodley Head. ISBN 978-1-84792-150-5.
- Williams, Paul (1969) [1st pub. Crawdaddy!: July 1966]. "Understanding Dylan". Outlaw Blues; a Book of Rock Music. E. P. Dutton. pp. 59–69. OCLC 218622.
- Williams, Paul (2004) [1990]. Bob Dylan, Performing Artist: The Early Years, 1960–1973. Omnibus Press. ISBN 978-1-84449-095-0.
