= Home Again, Home Again =

EP by Hem
- Released: June 26, 2007
- Genre: Folk rock
- Length: 18:30
- Label: Nettwerk

Hem chronology
Funnel Cloud (2006)	Home Again, Home Again (2007)

Home Again, Home Again is the sixth release by folk rock band Hem. The EP was released on June 26, 2007. A song from the EP, "The Part Where You Let Go", was featured in a 2007 Liberty Mutual commercial.

== Track listing ==
1. "The Part Where You Let Go" (3:44)
2. "Half Asleep" (2:19)
3. "While My Hand Was Letting Go" (3:36)
4. "The Meeting Place" (1:12)
5. "Home Again" (4:18)
6. "Half Acre" (3:22)
