= Desert Daze =

Music festival in California

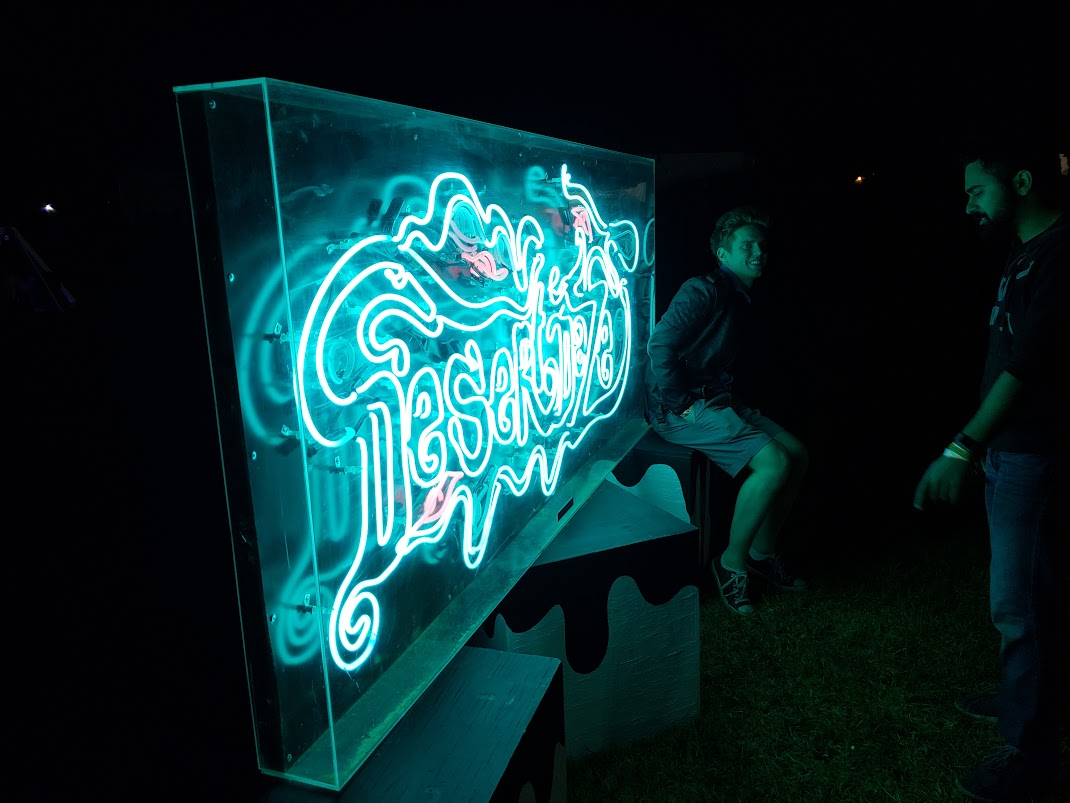
- The neon Desert Daze entry sign from the 2018 festival at the Lake Perris State Recreation Area
- Genre: neo-psychedelia; experimental music; dream pop; art pop; hip-hop; lo-fi; noise music
- Years active: 2012-2019, 2021-2022
- Most recent: Sep 30, 2022 – Oct 2, 2022
- Attendance: 10,000
- Website: desertdaze.org

Desert Daze is a music festival held at the Lake Perris Recreation Area in Moreno Valley, California. Festival founder Phil Pirrone, formerly of post-hardcore band, A Static Lullaby, and of JJUUJJUU, had "...always wanted to do an extended festival, and all these people being in the desert for an extended amount of time presented a perfect opportunity to make that happen". The current format of the festival is no longer extended, spanning a more traditional three days. Described as "sort of an anti-festival festival", the festival grounds often showcase abstract and psychedelic art installations, thematically aligned with the artists primarily from the neo-psychedelia, desert rock, experimental, dream pop, art pop, hip-hop, lo-fi, and noise genres. Notable headliners include King Gizzard and the Lizard Wizard, Iggy Pop, Tame Impala, Stereolab, Devo, Wu-Tang Clan, Beach House, and My Bloody Valentine. In 2022, the festival drew an estimated crowd of 10,000 attendees.

Desert Daze has not been held since 2022.

== History ==
Pirrone previously organized the Moon Block Party festival, which evolved into Desert Daze in 2012, where the festival was initially held in Desert Hot Springs, California. For the following three years, until 2015, the festival took place at the Sunset Ranch Oasis in Mecca, shifting from its previous extended 11 day format. In 2016, the festival relocated to the Institute of Mentalphysics in Joshua Tree National Park. In 2018, the festival moved again to Lake Perris State Recreation Area.

Desert Daze was not held in 2020 due to the COVID-19 pandemic. A scaled-down version of the festival was held in November 2021, with 24 acts on one stage across three days. The full Desert Daze returned from September 30th to October 3rd, 2022, and featured Tame Impala playing Lonerism in its entirety for the album's tenth anniversary, the only such performance of their career.

In July 2023 Desert Daze organizers announced they would not hold the festival that year, citing the need for "extra time to ensure we deliver an experience that surpasses expectations for many years to come."

Desert Daze 2024 was announced in July and scheduled for October 10-13, featuring headliners Jack White and Cigarettes After Sex. On August 30th, organizers announced that Desert Daze 2024 was canceled, stating that “rising production costs and the current volatile festival market” had made it “no longer possible to execute the weekend as planned.” Festival founder Phil Pirrone said in an interview with the L.A. Times that low ticket sales were also a factor in the cancellation.

No festival was held in 2025, and as of July 2026 no festival has been announced for 2026. Desert Daze organizers continue to present year-round concerts at standard venues throughout Southern California.

== Popular culture ==
The 2019 poster for Desert Daze was featured briefly in Ari Aster's Beau is Afraid.

== Lineups ==
The following lineups include artists that have performed at the Lake Perris State Recreation Area venue including years: 2022, 2021, 2019, and 2018

=== 2022 ===
- King Gizzard and the Lizard Wizard
- Tame Impala
- Beach House
- Chicano Batman
- Sky Ferreira
- Perfume Genius
- Mild High Club
- Kikagaku Moyo
- Viagra Boys
- The Marías
- BADBADNOTGOOD
- JPEGMAFIA

=== 2021 ===
- The War on Drugs
- Tim Heidecker
- Weyes Blood
- Ty Segall
- DIIV
- Kamasi Washington
- Devendra Banhart
- Toro y Moi
- Japanese Breakfast
- Yves Tumor
- Crumb
- Sasami
- Spellling

=== 2019 ===
- The Flaming Lips
- Stereolab
- Animal Collective
- Fred Armisen
- Connan Mockasin
- Mdou Moctar
- Atlas Sound
- Ween
- Ride
- Devo
- Flying Lotus
- Parquet Courts
- Psychedelic Porn Crumpets
- Viagra Boys
- Wu-Tang Clan
- Khruangbin
- Alvvays
- Shintaro Sakamoto

=== 2018 ===
- My Bloody Valentine
- Slowdive
- King Gizzard and the Lizard Wizard
- Tame Impala
- Death Grips
- Mercury Rev
- A Place to Bury Strangers
- Pond
- Dakhabrakha
- Earth
- Julia Holter
- Chelsea Wolfe

== See also ==
- Bonnaroo Music Festival
- Levitation (festival)
- Burning Man
