= Circles (The Autumn Defense album) =

2003 album by The Autumn Defense

Studio album by the Autumn Defense
- Released: October 21, 2003
- Recorded: February 2002 – January 2003
- Genre: Indie rock; indie pop
- Label: Arena Rock
- Producer: The Autumn Defence

The Autumn Defense chronology
The Green Hour (2001)	Circles (2003)	Birds, Beasts, & Flowers EP (2004)

Professional ratings
Review scores
Source	Rating
AllMusic	link
Music Box	link
Pitchfork	6.9/10 stars

Circles is the second album by The Autumn Defense, composed of multi-instrumentalists John Stirratt and Pat Sansone.

== Track listing ==
All tracks composed by John Stirratt and Pat Sansone; except where indicated

1. "Silence" (Pat Sansone)
2. "The Sun in California"
3. "Written in the Snow"
4. "The Answer"
5. "The World (Will Soon Turn Our Way)" (John Stirratt)
6. "Why I'm Like This" (Jeff Tweedy, John Stirratt)
7. "Tuesday Morning" (Pat Sansone)
8. "Some Kind of Fool"
9. "Iowa City Adieu" (John Stirratt)
10. "Circles"

== Personnel ==
The Autumn Defence

- John Stiratt - vocals, guitars, bass
- Pat Sansone - vocals, guitars, bass, keyboards
- Brad Jones - bass, 12-string, organ
- Greg Wieczorek as Greg Wiz - drums, percussion

With:

- Ryan Rapsys - drums (6, 7)
- John Pirruccello - pedal steel (2)
- Jeff Tweedy - electric guitar (6)
- Steve Tyska - horns (6, 9, 10)
- Andrew Bird - violin (4)
