= I'm Talking with My Mouth =

EP by Hem
- Released: 2002
- Genre: Indie, folk
- Label: Setanta Records/Waveland Records

Hem chronology
Rabbit Songs (2002)	I'm Talking with My Mouth (2002)	Eveningland (2004)

I'm Talking with My Mouth is an EP by indie folk band Hem. It consists of five cover songs and was sometimes included with pressings of their debut album, Rabbit Songs.

== Track listing ==
No.	Title	Writer(s)	Original artist	Length
1.	"Jackson"	Jerry Leiber and Billy Edd Wheeler	Johnny Cash and June Carter	3:31
2.	"Valentine's Day"	Bruce Springsteen	Bruce Springsteen	4:31
3.	"(The Angels Wanna Wear My) Red Shoes"	Elvis Costello	Elvis Costello	2:38
4.	"Living Without You"	Randy Newman	Randy Newman	2:39
5.	"A Dream Is a Wish Your Heart Makes"	Mack David, Al Hoffman and Jerry Livingston	Ilene Woods	2:36
