= Golden Sings That Have Been Sung =

Studio album by Ryley Walker
- Released: August 19, 2016
- Genres: Psychedelic folk, folk rock
- Length: 40:37
- Label: Dead Oceans
- Producers: LeRoy Bach, Ryley Walker

Ryley Walker chronology
Primrose Green (2015)	Golden Sings That; Have Been Sung (2016)	Deafman Glance (2018)

Golden Sings That Have Been Sung is the third studio album by American musician Ryley Walker. It was released in August 2016 under Dead Oceans Records.

== Critical reception ==
Professional ratings
Aggregate scores
Source	Rating
AnyDecentMusic?	7.5/10
Metacritic	80/100
Review scores
Source	Rating
AllMusic	3.5/5 stars
Chicago Tribune	3/4 stars
The Guardian	3/5 stars
The Independent	5/5 stars
The Irish Times	3/5 stars
Mojo	4/5 stars
Pitchfork	6.5/10
Record Collector	5/5 stars
The Times	5/5 stars
Uncut	9/10

The album received a Metacritic score of 80 based on 16 critics, indicating generally favorable reviews.

== Track listing ==
No.	Title	Length
1.	"The Halfwit in Me"	5:54
2.	"A Choir Apart"	3:11
3.	"Funny Thing She Said"	6:26
4.	"Sullen Mind"	6:32
5.	"I Will Ask You Twice"	2:02
6.	"The Roundabout"	4:41
7.	"The Great and Undecided"	3:39
8.	"Age Old Tale"	8:12

== Personnel ==
Adapted from Discogs.

- Ryley Walker – Acoustic Guitar, Vocals
- LeRoy Bach – Acoustic Guitar, Electric Guitar, Keyboards [Keys], Piano, Clarinet, Percussion, Lap Steel Guitar, Production
- Anton Hatwich – Bass
- Frank Rosaly, Quin Kirchner, Ryan Jewell – Drums
- Brian Sulpizio – Electric Guitar
- Ben Boye – Keyboards [Keys], Piano, Autoharp
- Whitney Johnson – Viola

=== Technical ===
- Artwork – Brian Blomerth
- Design – Miles Johnson
- Engineer – Cooper Crain
- Engineer [Additional Engineering] – Matt Dewine
- Engineer [Additional Engineering] – LeRoy Bach
- Mastered By – Jeff Lipton
- Mastered By [Assistant Mastering Engineer] – Maria Rice
- Mixed By – Brian Deck
- Producer, Arranged By – LeRoy Bach, Ryley Walker

== Weekly charts ==
Chart (2016)	Peak position
US Americana/Folk Albums (Billboard)	19
US Heatseekers Albums (Billboard)	14
US Independent Albums (Billboard)	44
US Indie Store Album Sales (Billboard)	19
