= Hem (band) =

American musical group

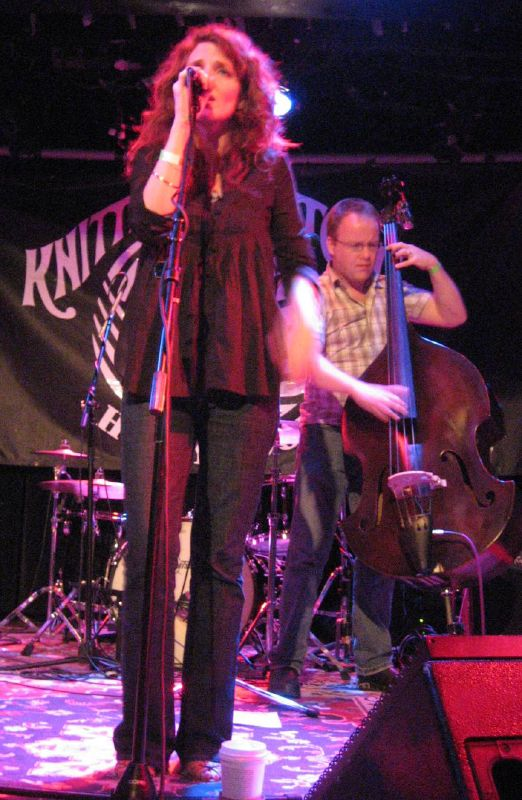
- Hem playing The Knitting Factory, 2006

Background information
- Origin: Brooklyn, New York, United States
- Genres: Alternative rock, folk
- Years active: 1999–present
- Labels: Nettwerk, Rounder, Setanta Records
- Members: Mark Brotter; Steve Curtis; Sally Ellyson; Bob Hoffnar; Dawn Landes; Gary Maurer; Dan Messé; George Rush; Heather Zimmerman Messé
- Past members: Catherine Popper
- Website: www.hemmusic.com

Hem is a musical group from Brooklyn, New York. Band members include Sally Ellyson (vocals), Dan Messé (piano, accordion, glockenspiel), Gary Maurer (guitar, mandolin), Steve Curtis (guitar, mandolin, banjo, back-up vocals), George Rush (bass guitar), Mark Brotter (drums), Bob Hoffnar (pedal steel guitar), Dawn Landes (background vocals and glockenspiel) and Heather Zimmerman Messé (violin). The group sometimes expands to include other musicians and orchestral accompaniments.

Their music has been variously described as "folk", "indie", "Americana" and "roots". Stylistically, their songs bridge 19th-century American parlour music, Appalachian folk music, gospel music, traditional American ballads, the European art song, early jazz, and even contemporary classical music.

== Band history ==
In 1999, songwriter Dan Messé and producer Gary Maurer teamed up and decided to produce a record. A mutual friend, Steve Curtis, joined them. None of them knew any potential singing talents for the band, so they placed an advertisement in The Village Voice. Overwhelmed by an onslaught of bizarre and unlistenable demo tapes, the three friends soon abandoned their quest.

Months later Sally Ellyson called Messé in response to the ad, cautioning that she was not really a "singer". A skeptical Messé asked Ellyson for a demo tape and was greatly surprised when he heard the very spare recording, which featured Ellyson's a cappella renditions of several old-time lullabies that she had recorded for the infant son of a long-time friend. Messé was impressed — and Hem had finally found itself a singer. Ellyson was soon whisked into New York recording studio, Stratosphere Sound, to record vocals on tracks that would later become the album Rabbit Songs.

Rabbit Songs was widely acclaimed in the U.S. music press. The album received glowing praise in a feature story on NPR's All Things Considered and garnered an enthusiastic review from Entertainment Weekly. Allmusic described the album as having an "effortlessly timeless appeal". Including overseas releases, the album has been issued and reissued a total of eight times as of 2006. One of the songs, "Leave Me Here", was recorded by one of Messé's previous bands, Big Iron Skillet.

Problems at Hem's new label, DreamWorks Records, delayed the release of the band's second album. Finally, in late 2004, Eveningland was released on Rounder Records. Eveningland capitalized on the success of Rabbit Songs, enjoying positive reviews in the U.S. from the likes of Pitchfork Media as well as from international media outlets, such as the BBC.

In early 2006, Hem's third album, No Word From Tom, was released by Nettwerk. In much the same vein as the band's EP I'm Talking With My Mouth, No Word From Tom showcased a collection of cover songs, live versions of original songs from prior albums, and some new material. It features new bass player George Rush, though original bassist Katherine Popper plays on two tracks.

Several of Ellyson's lullabies have been featured on Hem releases. Rabbit Songs opened with the lullaby "Lord, Blow the Moon Out, Please" from the original demo tape. Eveningland featured "Now the Day is Over" as a hidden track (after the song "Carry Me Home"), and No Word From Tom opened with yet another lullaby, "All the Pretty Horses."

Later in 2006, Hem received a career boost when the song "Half-Acre", from Rabbit Songs, was featured in a television commercial for Liberty Mutual insurance, which brought their music to many who might not otherwise have heard it. In May 2007, in a follow-up campaign, Liberty Mutual used Hem's music once again, debuting a new song, "The Part Where You Let Go."

Hem's fourth album, Funnel Cloud, was released on September 5, 2006. Funnel Cloud was recorded with a 21-piece orchestra, and with help from the likes of former The Smashing Pumpkins guitarist James Iha and Ollabelle vocalist Amy Helm (daughter of Levon Helm). One of the songs from the album, "Not California", was subsequently featured on NPR's "All Songs Considered."

In 2007, the band received another career boost when they played with the Boston Pops at Symphony Hall, for the Boston Pops' annual event Edgefest.

The band provided the music for the 2009 Public Theater production of Shakespeare's "Twelfth Night" at the Delacorte Theater in Central Park, featuring Anne Hathaway in the role of Viola. The band received a nomination for Outstanding Music in a Play for the 2009/2010 Drama Desk Awards.

The band released the album Departure and Farewell in 2013. The band toured in the US and the UK in 2013, along with a session on the Bob Harris Sunday show on BBC Radio 2 in October.

A 2013 article on poptech.org noted, "But as work on Departure and Farewell continued, it was increasingly characterized by upheaval, riven by the dissolution of two marriages, and punctuated by addiction, family loss and crisis. Eventually discord set in, making it even more likely that the band’s career would end here, and not with a grace note."

Ten years after this hiatus, the band revealed on September 24, 2023 that they had begun working on music once again. From their Facebook page: "Dear Friends, at long last we can confirm that we are making new Hem music for you. We couldn’t be more excited. Stay tuned!"

== Discography ==
=== Albums ===
- Rabbit Songs (CD) - DreamWorks - 2002
- Eveningland (CD) - Rounder Records - 2004
- No Word from Tom (CD) - Nettwerk - 2006
- Funnel Cloud (CD) - Nettwerk - 2006
- Twelfth Night (CD) - Waveland - 2009
- Departure and Farewell (CD) - Nettwerk - 2013

=== EPs and singles ===
- I'm Talking with My Mouth EP (CD) - Waveland Records/Setanta Records - 2002
- Birds, Beasts, & Flowers EP (CD) (with The Autumn Defense) - Arena Rock Recording Co. - 2004
- Home Again, Home Again EP (CD) - 2007
- Peace at Last EP (CD) - Waveland Records - 2007
- The World Is Outside EP (CD) - Nettwerk - 2015

=== Compilations ===
- This Is Next Year: A Brooklyn-Based Compilation (CD) - Arena Rock Recording Co. - "Horsey" - 2001
- Almost You: The Songs of Elvis Costello (CD) - Bar None Records - "(The Angels Wanna Wear My) Red Shoes" - 2003
- Stockings by the Fire (CD) - Hear Music - "Have Yourself a Merry Little Christmas" - 2007
- Paint It Black: An Alt Country Tribute To The Rolling Stones (Download) - Reimagine Music - "You Can't Always Get What You Want" - 2011
