= Deep Fried Grandeur =

Live album by Ryley Walker and Kikagaku Moyo
- Released: February 5, 2021
- Recorded: November 2018
- Venue: Le Guess Who? (Utrecht)
- Genres: Psychedelia; krautrock
- Length: 36:36
- Label: Husky Pants
- Producer: Cooper Crain

Ryley Walker chronology
Little Common Twist (2019)	Deep Fried Grandeur (2021)	Course in Fable (2021)

Kikagaku Moyo chronology
Live at LEVITATION (2021)	Deep Fried Grandeur (2021)	Kumoyo Island (2022)

Deep Fried Grandeur is a collaborative live album by American musician Ryley Walker and Japanese band Kikagaku Moyo. It was released on February 5, 2021, through Walker's Husky Pants Records. The album was recorded during their performance at the 2018 Le Guess Who? festival in Utrecht, Netherlands, and its title comes from the name the two acts played under for the festival.

Containing just two tracks totaling over 36 minutes, Deep Fried Grandeur consists entirely of improvised jamming, with minor editing done by Cooper Crain, who is credited as producer. Upon release, the album topped the Bandcamp best-selling list. Reviews of the album were positive, praising the interplay between the two bands while many also noted elements of psychedelia and krautrock.

== Reception ==
Professional ratings
Aggregate scores
Source	Rating
Metacritic	80/100
Review scores
Source	Rating
Pitchfork	6.7/10
Uncut	4/5 stars
The Wire	8/10

Ryan Leas of Stereogum called the album a "nice reminder" of the "uniquely live experience" of the improvised jams present in both Walker's and Kikagaku Moyo's shows. Writing for Jambands, Kristopher Weiss stated that while the album is "not for everyone", he considered it "a sonic adventure worth taking" and called it "a batch of sometimes-formless psychedelic soup that entertains in spite of itself."

In a review for Pitchfork, Steven Arroyo rated the album 6.7 out of 10 and called it an "instrumental, krautrock-ish noodle journey". While he felt the album is missing the "back-pocket compass of the best semi-rehearsed, semi-improvised jams, the kind where you have no idea where it’s headed but still give yourself over to it", he ultimately considered the performance to be "a joy to vizualize."

== Track listing ==
Side one
No.	Title	Length
1.	"Pour Dampness Down in the Stream"	18:35

Side two
No.	Title	Length
1.	"Shrinks the Day"	18:01
Total length:		36:36

== Personnel ==
- Ryley Walker – guitar
- Frank Rosaly – drums, percussion
- Brian J. Sulpizio – guitar
- Andrew Scott Young – bass, cello

Kikagaku Moyo

- Go Kurosawa – drums, percussion
- Daoud Popal – guitar, percussion
- Kotsu Guy – bass
- Ryu Kurosawa – sitar
- Tomo Katsurada – guitar, cello
