= All Kinds of You =

Studio album by Ryley Walker
- Released: April 15, 2014
- Studio: Minbal (Chicago)
- Length: 35:12
- Label: Tompkins Square

Ryley Walker chronology
West Wind (2013)	All Kinds of You (2014)	Primrose Green (2015)

All Kinds of You is the debut studio album by American musician Ryley Walker. It was released on April 15, 2014, through Tompkins Square Records.

== Reception ==
All Kinds of You received positive reviews from critics. Writing for AllMusic, Thom Jurek gave the album 3.5 stars out of 5 and said Walker possessed "the self-assuredness of an artist far older than his 24 years". The Line of Best Fit felt that the album "mixes and matches various oft-referenced folk-rock (and just plain folk) styles until they become if not totally fresh, then at the very least refreshing".

== Track listing ==
All tracks are written by Ryley Walker.

All Kinds of You
No.	Title	Length
1.	"The West Wind"	5:17
2.	"Blessings"	5:26
3.	"Twin Oaks Pt. 1"	3:24
4.	"Great River Road"	2:47
5.	"Clear the Sky"	4:54
6.	"Twin Oaks Pt. II"	5:06
7.	"Fonda"	2:08
8.	"On the Rise"	3:02
9.	"Tanglewood Spaces"	3:39

== Personnel ==
- Ryley Walker – guitar, vocals
- Ben Billington – drums
- Ben Boye – piano
- Whitney Johnson – viola
- Dan Thatcher – bass
- Brian Sulpizio – electric guitar (8)
