= Blonde on the Tracks =

2020 album by Emma Swift

Studio album by Emma Swift
- Released: August 14, 2020
- Recorded: 2017–2020
- Studio: Magnetic Sound Studio (Nashville) and home recordings
- Genre: Alternative country
- Length: 44:43
- Label: Tiny Ghost Records
- Producer: Pat Sansone

Emma Swift chronology
Emma Swift (2014)	Blonde on the Tracks (2020)

Singles from Blonde on the Tracks
- 1. "I Contain Multitudes" Released: 28 May 2020; 2. "Queen Jane Approximately" Released: 8 July 2020; 3. "You're a Big Girl Now" Released: 11 August 2020; 4. "Simple Twist of Fate" Released: October 2020; 5. "One of Us Must Know (Sooner or Later)" Released: December 2020

Blonde on the Tracks is the debut studio album by Australian singer-songwriter Emma Swift and was released August 14, 2020 by Tiny Ghost Records. The album consists of Bob Dylan covers and was recorded between 2017 and 2020 in Nashville, Tennessee, the album was produced by Wilco's Pat Sansone and featured a number of well-known Nashville musicians as Swift's backing band, including British guitarist Robyn Hitchcock, Swift's partner.

Swift said "The idea for the album came about during a long depressive phase, the kind where it's hard to get out of bed and get dressed and present to the world as a high-functioning human. I was lost on all fronts no doubt, but especially creatively. I've never been a prolific writer, but this period was especially wordless. Sad, listless and desperate, I began singing Bob Dylan songs as a way to have something to wake up for. Interpreting other people's emotions is how I learned to sing and I've always enjoyed hearing Dylan's songs from a female perspective. You can learn a lot about melody and feeling by the way a singer chooses to interpret someone else's song."

Five singles were released from the album across 2020, all with animated video clips.

== Production ==
The album developed out of a long depressive period for Swift, when writing songs of her own had become increasingly difficult. Swift found listening to Dylan, and eventually singing her own version of his songs, to be "a way to have something to wake up for", she told an interviewer for the Irish Times. Beyond the quality of Dylan's songwriting, Swift said in an interview with Nashville Scene that she was drawn to Dylan's "supremely confident" attitude as an artist during a time when she was acutely depressed. Swift finished six of the eight songs in 2017, working with producer Pat Sansone at Nashville's Magnetic Sound Studio, but put the project aside without releasing the songs. She was reinspired to complete the album in 2020 due to the worldwide COVID-19 quarantine as well as Dylan's own 2020 album, Rough and Rowdy Ways. Recording in home studios, Swift and her band completed two more covers, including a version of "I Contain Multitudes" from Rough and Rowdy Ways.

== Critical reception ==
Professional ratings
Review scores
Source	Rating
Irish Times	4/5 stars
Under the Radar	8/10 stars
Morning Star	3/4 stars
American Songwriter	3.5/5 stars
The Guardian	4/5 stars

The album received largely positive reviews from critics.

Mark Moody of Under the Radar called the album "truly a master class in interpretation." Hal Horowitz of American Songwriter praised "Swift’s sweet, innocent, usually mellifluous voice", and called the album "a generally successful, instantly likeable meeting of voice, production and of course songs," but also felt that none of the songs were "definitive ... Swift and Sansone’s approach to these Dylan chestnuts is more toned down than you might expect or anticipate." Joe Breen, writing in the Irish Times, noted the difficulty in finding something new in such an often-interpreted musician as Dylan, and said that "rarely has he been covered so tenderly as on this quietly impressive (and wittily titled) collection." Brittney McKenna of Nashville Scene wrote that Swift's vocals are "at once delicate and tough, recalling the sturdy sultriness of Cat Power or Jenny Lewis far more than Dylan’s own folky rasp."

Greil Marcus, writing in his monthly "Real Life Rock Top 10" column, called the album an "honorable" tribute to Dylan. He singled out Swift's version of "One of Us Must Know (Sooner or Later)", calling it a "real transformation... Her high, clear voice highlights each syllable, letting you hear the words form, one seemingly following inevitably from the other, until they feel handed down, fragments of old songs now speaking to each other." He also praised Hitchcock's guitar work: "never in the way, always on the verge of fading out, making you say, no, no, not yet."

== In live performance ==
Swift performed a concert at Grimey's in Nashville, Tennessee that was live-streamed on YouTube on August 20, 2020 in order promote to the album. She performed seven of the album's eight tracks—leaving off only the epic "Sad Eyed Lady of the Lowlands", which was replaced by "I've Made Up My Mind to Give Myself to You", another song from Dylan's Rough and Rowdy Ways. The audio of this performance of "I've Made Up My Mind to Give Myself to You" was later made available to listen to on the "International Women's Day" episode of the Definitely Dylan podcast and radio show.

On April 20, 2021, Swift announced an Australian tour in June to promote the album and mark Dylan's 80th birthday.

== Track list ==
All tracks are written by Bob Dylan.

Blonde on the Tracks track listing
No.	Title	Length
1.	"Queen Jane Approximately"	4:36
2.	"I Contain Multitudes"	5:07
3.	"One of Us Must Know (Sooner or Later)"	6:19
4.	"Simple Twist of Fate"	4:20
5.	"Sad Eyed Lady of the Lowlands"	11:57
6.	"The Man in Me"	3:26
7.	"Going, Going, Gone"	3:30
8.	"You're a Big Girl Now"	5:28

== Personnel ==
- Emma Swift – vocals
- Jon Estes – bass guitar
- Robyn Hitchcock – guitar
- Jon Radford – drums and percussion
- Patrick Sansone – guitar, keyboards, bass guitar, percussion, production
- Thayer Serrano – pedal steel guitar

== Charts ==
=== Weekly charts ===
Chart (2020)	Peak position
Australian Albums (ARIA)	9
