= No Word from Tom =

No Word From Tom

Studio album by Hem
- Released: February 7, 2006
- Genre: Indie pop/folk music
- Length: 50:58
- Label: Nettwerk

Hem chronology
Birds, Beasts, & Flowers (2004)	No Word From Tom (2006)	Funnel Cloud (2006)

Professional ratings
Review scores
Source	Rating
AllMusic	3.5/5 stars
Pitchfork Media	6.2/10

No Word From Tom is the third album from indie folk band Hem. Released on February 7, 2006, it features covers, live songs, and new recordings from the band.

== Track listing ==
All songs written by Dan Messé, except where noted.

1. "All the Pretty Horses" (Traditional) - 0:30
2. "Rainy Night in Georgia" (Tony Joe White) - 4:30
3. "Radiation Vibe" (Chris Collingwood, Adam Schlesinger) - 3:45
4. "The Present" - 4:46
5. "Cincinnati Traveler" (Steve Curtis) - 1:02
6. "Betting on Trains" - 3:49
7. "So. Central Rain" (Berry, Buck, Mills, Stipe) - 3:10
8. "Tennessee Waltz" (Pee Wee King, Redd Stewart) - 2:46
9. "Sailor" - 3:35
10. "Eveningland" - 2:11
11. "Idle (The Rabbit Song)" - 3:42
12. "Crazy Arms" (Ralph Mooney and Charles Seals) - 2:24
13. "Oh No" (Gary Maurer, Messé) - 2:11
14. "All That I'm Good For" - 3:34
15. "The City and the Traveler" - 1:03
16. "Lazy Eye" (Gary Maurer, Messé) - 2:34
17. "The Beautiful Sea" - 2:40
18. "The Golden Day Is Dying" (Traditional) - 2:46

== Personnel ==
- Sally Ellyson - vocals
- Dan Messé - piano, accordion, glockenspiel
- Gary Maurer - guitar, mandolin
- Steve Curtis - guitar, mandolin, banjo, back-up vocals
- George Rush - bass guitar
- Mark Brotter - drums
- Bob Hoffnar - pedal steel guitar
- Heather Zimmerman - violin
