= Deafman Glance =

Studio album by Ryley Walker
- Released: May 18, 2018
- Recorded: January – October, 2017
- Genres: Psychedelic folk, folk rock
- Length: 41:29
- Label: Dead Oceans
- Producers: Leroy Bach, Ryley Walker

Ryley Walker chronology
Golden Sings That Have Been Sung (2016)	Deafman Glance (2018)	The Lillywhite Sessions (2018)

Deafman Glance is the fourth studio album by American musician Ryley Walker. It was released in May 2018 under Dead Oceans Records.

== Critical reception ==
Professional ratings
Aggregate scores
Source	Rating
Metacritic	76/100
Review scores
Source	Rating
AllMusic	4/5 stars
The Line of Best Fit	7/10
MusicOMH	3/5 stars
Pitchfork	(7.9/10)
Record Collector	4/5 stars
Tiny Mix Tapes	3.5/5 stars
Uncut	(8/10)
Under the Radar	7/10

The album received a Metacritic score of 76 based on 13 critics, indicating generally favorable reviews.

== Accolades ==
Publication	Accolade	Rank	Ref.
Stereogum	50 Best Albums of 2018	36	
Stereogum	Mid-Year - 50 Best Albums of 2018 So Far	17	
Uncut	75 Best Albums of 2018	44	
Under the Radar	100 Best Albums of 2018	70	

== Track listing ==
No.	Title	Length
1.	"In Castle Dome"	5:36
2.	"22 Days"	6:00
3.	"Accommodations"	3:05
4.	"Can't Ask Why"	5:41
5.	"Opposite Middle"	3:36
6.	"Telluride Speed"	6:27
7.	"Expired"	5:41
8.	"Rocks on Rainbow"	1:45
9.	"Spoil with the Rest"	3:42

== Personnel ==
Adapted from Discogs.

- Written-by, Producer, Vocals, Electric Guitar, Acoustic Guitar – Ryley Walker
- Producer, Arranged By [Horns], Keyboards, Lap Steel Guitar, Piano, Clarinet, Electric Guitar – Leroy Bach
- Bass – Matthew Lux (tracks: 3, 4, 7)
- Double Bass, Bass – Andrew Scott Young
- Drums – Quin Kirchner (tracks: 1, 5, 6, 9)
- Drums, Percussion, Bells – Mikel Avery
- Electric Guitar – Bill MacKay, Brian Sulpizio
- Flute, Saxophone – Nate Lepine (tracks: 1, 3, 5 to 7)
- Mastered by – Jeff Lipton
- Cover Painting – Tim Hallinan
- Photography – Evan Jenkins
- Design – Miles Johnson
- Recorded by, Mixed By, Synth, Organ – Cooper Crain

== Charts ==
Chart performance for Deafman Glance
Chart (2018)	Peak position
Belgian Albums (Ultratop Flanders)	50
Dutch Albums (Album Top 100)	147
German Albums (Offizielle Top 100)	87
Scottish Albums (Official Charts)	60
UK Americana Albums (Official Charts)	4
UK Independent Albums (Official Charts)	12
UK Vinyl Albums (OCC)	15
