= Kikagaku Moyo =

Japanese psychedelic band

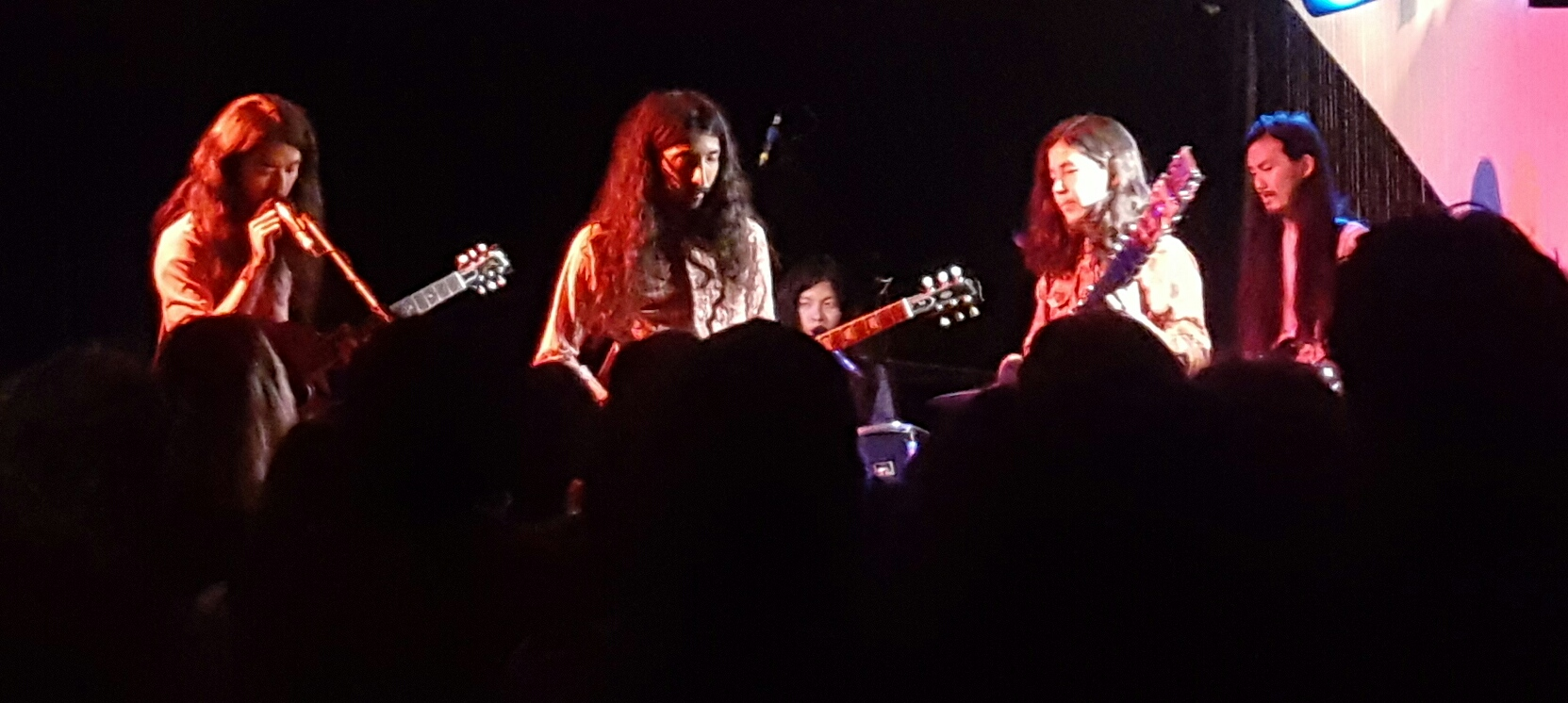
- Kikagaku Moyo at Casa Del Popolo in Montreal.

Background information
- Origin: Tokyo, Japan
- Genres: Psychedelic rock, acid rock, experimental rock, krautrock, psychedelic folk, neo-psychedelia, hard rock, alternative rock, funk
- Years active: 2012–2022
- Label: Guruguru Brain
- Members: Go Kurosawa; Tomo Katsurada; Kotsu Guy; Daoud Popal; Ryu Kurosawa
- Website: kikagakumoyo.com

Kikagaku Moyo (Japanese: 幾何学模様, Hepburn: Kikagaku Moyō) were a Japanese psychedelic rock band founded in Tokyo and active from 2012 to 2022.

== Name ==
Kikagaku Moyo (幾何学模様, Kikagaku Moyō) translates to “geometric patterns”, which the drummer Go Kurosawa suggested as a band name after getting visuals caused by sleep deprivation during a long jam session at night. In a 2014 interview with the It’s Psychedelic Baby! magazine, Go recalls the moment at which he came up with the name: "It means geometric patterns, which I saw on the back of my eyelids after jamming all night long. I was totally in the “zone”, half awake and half asleep, but my hands were tapping the drums involuntarily. Tomo and I both wanted to have a Japanese name with Kanji characters, so it was decided pretty quickly."

== History ==
Future drummer and guitarist Go Kurosawa and Tomo Katsurada met in the summer of 2012 in Tokyo following Tomo's return from studying film in the US. Having similar interests in music, fashion, and movies, they decided to start playing music together. Though Go had played piano and Tomo knew the cello, neither had substantial prior experience in the instruments they wanted to play in the band. Initially, the two often played together in an old studio where their friend worked, from midnight to morning, the reason for that being the high price of playing in the studio during the day.

Dissatisfied with their sound, Go and Tomo soon went out to search for more people to join the band. They specifically sought people who, like they themselves, didn’t have much experience but wanted to play music together. They started with putting up signs and handing out posters at their college. They eventually met their bassist Kotsu Guy, who at the time was recording sounds from a vending machine on the street for a drone project. Tomo met their second guitarist Daoud Popal in the college's smoking area. Around the same time, Go's brother Ryu Kurosawa returned from India and joined the band as their sitarist. The members had little in common in terms of musical taste, leading to difficulties sharing about their musical interests that persisted until they had been playing together for a year. Go had a mixed music taste and was the only one listening to psychedelic rock while Tomo preferred power pop, Kotsu Guy black metal, and Daoud hip-hop. Since most of the members weren’t technically proficient, they decided to adopt a psychedelic, meditative style, as a utilitarian approach to play music together. This style is especially present on their self-titled debut album.

Kikagaku Moyo found little success domestically, one reason being the expensive cost of performing live shows in Japan, where venues charge bands for shows rather than paying them. According to Go Kurosawa in an interview, bands have to pay around $300 for a 30–35 minute show. Because of this, the band started busking on Tokyo streets, outside of busy train stations. The group also made an attempt to set up psyche festivals around Tokyo, charging about five dollars for entry, with the aim of providing a cheap and accessible music scene. However, these approaches did not lead to progress for the band. In an interview, Go says “[In Japan,] most people don’t like this kind of thing, they like following the rules”. Furthermore, the crowds were mostly made up of foreigners. This inspired the group to go abroad: their first tour took place in America, where they played the Levitation festival in 2014.

Their second LP "Forest of Lost Children" was released on May 20, 2014 by Brooklyn based Beyond Beyond is Beyond Records. They toured the U.S. in April 2014 in support of the record, with appearances at Desert Daze and Austin Psych Fest. Due to high demand, their S/T record was reissued on cassette tape by Burger Records, and a new tape by the name of "Mammatus Clouds" was released on the eclectic Sky Lantern Records in Tucson, Arizona. "Mammatus Clouds" was pressed onto 12" LP by both Cardinal Fuzz Records (UK) and Captcha Records (US) in June 2014. The band continued to tour throughout 2014 and made their first appearance in the UK that October, selling out several shows in London.

In 2015 the band toured extensively through Europe with appearances at Eindhoven Psych Lab and Duna Jam. Members of the band also started the record label Guruguru Brain in 2015 to showcase the unique music scene in East Asia. They would release their next two records on it: House in the Tall Grass, released in May 2016, and Masana Temples, released in October 2018.

In 2017, they played a string of Gizzfest shows in Australia alongside friends King Gizzard & the Lizard Wizard, The Murlocs, La Luz, O.R.B and Parsnip. The band visited Australia a second time in March 2020 and played a small boutique festival named 'Nine Lives', hosted by local record store Jet Black Cat Music.

On 19 January 2022, the band announced they would go on an indefinite hiatus after 2022, and that their next record would be their last. Titled Kumoyo Island, the album was released in May 2022.

Kikagaku Moyo played their last show on December 3, 2022 at Meguro Persimmonn Hall in Tokyo.

== Members ==
=== Final lineup ===
- Go Kurosawa - vocals, drums, percussion, guitar, flute/recorder (2012–2022)
- Tomo Katsurada - vocals, guitar, percussion, cello, occasional horns (2012–2022)
- Kotsu Guy - bass guitar, occasional rhythm guitar (2012–2022)
- Daoud Popal - guitar, percussion, occasional drums (2012–2022)
- Ryu Kurosawa - sitar, keyboards, synthesizers, piano, organ (2012–2022)

=== Former ===
- Angie Gotopo - vocals, theremin (2013)

== Discography ==
=== Studio albums ===
- Kikagaku Moyo (2013, Cosmic Eye/Sound effect/Guruguru Brain)
- Forest of Lost Children (2014, Beyond Beyond is Beyond)
- House in the Tall Grass (2016, Guruguru Brain)
- Masana Temples (2018, Guruguru Brain)
- Kumoyo Island (2022, Guruguru Brain)

=== Live albums ===
- Live at Levitation (2021, Reverberation Appreciation Society)
- Deep Fried Grandeur (2021, Husky Pants Records) with Ryley Walker

=== EPs ===
- Mammatus Clouds (2014, Sky Lantern/Captcha/Cardinal Fuzz)
- Stone Garden (2017, Guruguru Brain)

=== Singles ===
- "Flujo y Reflujo" split with Kinski and Kawabata (2015, God Unknown)
- "Spinning Wheel" split with Moon Duo (2015, Jean Sandwich)
- "Gypsy Davey" / "Mushi No Uta" (2020, Sub Pop)
- "Ouchi Time" (2020, Looking Glass/Mexican Summer)
