= Funnel Cloud (album) =

Album by Hem

Studio album by Hem
- Released: September 5, 2006
- Genre: Folk rock
- Length: 48:08
- Label: Nettwerk
- Producer: Dan Messé, Gary Maurer

Hem chronology
| No Word From Tom (2006) | Funnel Cloud (2006) | Home Again, Home Again (2007) |

Professional ratings
Review scores
| Source | Rating |
|---|---|
| AllMusic | 4/5 stars |
| All Things Considered (NPR) | (positive) |
| Daily News | (positive) |
| Pitchfork | 6.1/10 |

Funnel Cloud is the fourth album by folk rock band Hem. It was released on Nettwerk on September 5, 2006. Considered the band's most ambitious work to date, they recorded the album accompanied by a 21-piece orchestra, as well as James Iha of the Smashing Pumpkins.

The concept was conceived on the day of lead singer Sally Ellyson's Virginia wedding, during which the party had to evacuate to storm cellars due to a number of tornadoes that touched down in the area.

== Track listing ==
All songs written by Dan Messé, except where noted.

1. We'll Meet Along The Way (Messé, Steve Curtis) - 2:04
2. He Came To Meet Me (Curtis) - 4:23
3. Not California (Messé, Gary Maurer) - 4:13
4. Funnel Cloud - 3:16
5. Too Late To Turn Back Now (Messé, Maurer) - 3:06
6. The Pills Stopped Working (Messé, Maurer) - 4:47
7. Hotel Fire (Messé, Maurer) - 3:51
8. Great Houses Of New York - 3:11
9. Curtains - 3:03
10. Old Adam - 2:39
11. The Burnt-Over District - 2:33
12. Reservoir (Curtis) - 3:19
13. I'll Dream Of You Tonight (Curtis) - 3:58
14. Almost Home - 2:02

== Personnel ==
- Sally Ellyson - vocals
- Dan Messé - piano, accordion, glockenspiel
- Gary Maurer - guitar, mandolin
- Steve Curtis - guitar, mandolin, banjo, back-up vocals
- George Rush - bass guitar
- Mark Brotter - drums
- Bob Hoffnar - pedal steel guitar
- Heather Zimmerman - violin
- Greg Pliska - orchestral arrangements
