= Kumoyo Island =

Studio album by Kikagaku Moyo
- Released: May 6, 2022
- Recorded: November 2020 – January 2021
- Studio: Guruguru Studio, Amsterdam; Tsubame Studio, Tokyo
- Genre: Psychedelic rock
- Length: 48:08
- Label: Guruguru Brain
- Producer: Kikagaku Moyo

Kikagaku Moyo chronology
Deep Fried Grandeur (2021)	Kumoyo Island (2022)

Kumoyo Island is the fifth and final studio album by Japanese psychedelic rock band Kikagaku Moyo. It was released on May 6, 2022 through the band's Guruguru Brain label.

== Recording ==
Due to COVID19 lockdowns in Amsterdam, where the band was based, Kikagaku Moyo returned to Tsubame Studios in Asakusabashi, Tokyo. This is the studio where they had recorded some of their earliest material. The album was recorded over 1.5 months from November 2020 to January 2021.

== Critical reception ==
Professional ratings
Aggregate scores
Source	Rating
Metacritic	83/100
Review scores
Source	Rating
AllMusic	4/5 stars
Pitchfork	7.8/10
Uncut	4/5 stars

Kumoyo Island received generally positive reviews from music critics. At Metacritic, which assigns a normalized rating out of 100 to reviews from mainstream critics, the album received an average score of 83, based on 4 reviews, which indicates "universal acclaim".

Pitchfork described Kumoyo Island as a " farewell album that feels like both a reinvention and a culmination."

Chris Deville of Stereogum said "it rivals 2018’s Masana Temples as the group’s finest album, and it may well be the most fun." Stereogum awarded it their Album of the Week.

== Track listing ==
No.	Title	Writer(s)	Length
1.	"Monaka"	Go; Tomo; Guy; Ryu	5:15
2.	"Dancing Blue"	Go; Tomo; Guy	6:14
3.	"Effe"	Go; Tomo	3:22
4.	"Meu Mar"	Erasmo Carlos	6:07
5.	"Cardboard Pile"	Go; Tomo; Guy	4:06
6.	"Gomugomu"	Go; Tomo	2:04
7.	"Daydream Soda"	Go	3:25
8.	"Field of Tiger Lillies"	Guy	1:19
9.	"Yayoi, Iyayoi"	Go; Tomo	6:58
10.	"Nap Song"	Go	2:58
11.	"Maison Silk Road"	Ryu	6:20

== Personnel ==
- Go Kurosawa - vocals, drums, percussion, guitar, flute/recorder
- Tomo Katsurada - vocals, guitar, percussion, cello, occasional horns
- Kotsu Guy - bass guitar, occasional rhythm guitar
- Daoud Popal - guitar, percussion, occasional drums
- Ryu Kurosawa - sitar, keyboards, synthesizers, piano, organ

Produced by Kikagaku Moyo
Tracks 4,5,6 mixed by Hideki Urawa
All other songs mixed by Yui Kimijima
Mastered by Soushi Mizuno
