= Course in Fable =

Studio album by Ryley Walker
- Released: April 2, 2021
- Genres: Folk rock; progressive rock
- Length: 40:19
- Label: Husky Pants
- Producer: John McEntire

Ryley Walker chronology
Deep Fried Grandeur (2021)	Course in Fable (2021)	So Certain (2022)

Singles from Course in Fable
- 1. "Rang Dizzy" Released: February 10, 2021; 2. "Axis Bent" Released: March 8, 2021

Course in Fable is the sixth solo studio album by American musician Ryley Walker. It was released on April 2, 2021, through Walker's own Husky Pants Records. The album was produced by John McEntire (of Tortoise and the Sea and Cake). The album combines the folk rock elements of Walker's previous albums with elements of progressive rock and art rock.

Critical reception to Course in Fable was positive, with many critics praising its deviation from Walker's previous albums, integration of prog rock elements, and stylistic diversity. In 2022, Walker released Course in Fable Demos and Extras, consisting of outtakes and alternate versions of the album's material.

== Reception ==
Course in Fable has received positive reviews from critics; on Metacritic, which assigns a normalized score out 100 to ratings from publications, the album received a weighted mean score of 84 based on 10 reviews, indicating "universal acclaim".

AllMusic's Timothy Monger awarded the album four stars out of five, feeling it contains "some of his [Walker's] most intricate and satisfying solo material to date." Monger highlighted the album's production and melding of indie rock and progressive rock, while also noting Walker's "increasing confidence as an ace bandleader." The site would go on to include Course in Fable in their singer-songwriter "Best of 2021" list. Josh Sand of Beats Per Minute gave the album a 76% rating, feeling it showcases Walker's "dual reputations as a singer/songwriter and prolifically-collaborating guitarist." Sand felt that the album could help to combat what he identified as stagnancy in modern progressive rock, stating "Course in Fable presents a vision of how progressive rock can contribute to music past its initial decades." Sand also noted that "Walker doesn’t see intricacy and gratification as mutual exclusives", feeling that the music "rewards attentive listening without its depth getting in the way of its charms on a passive background listen."

Professional ratings
Aggregate scores
Source	Rating
Metacritic	84/100
Review scores
Source	Rating
AllMusic	4/5 stars
Beats Per Minute	76%
Clash	8/10
DIY	4/5 stars
The Line of Best Fit	9/10
Mojo	4/5 stars
Pitchfork	7.6/10
Uncut	4.5/5 stars
Under the Radar	7/10

== Track listing ==
All tracks are written by Ryley Walker.

Course in Fable
No.	Title	Length
1.	"Striking Down Your Big Premiere"	5:04
2.	"Rang Dizzy"	4:45
3.	"A Lenticular Slap"	7:49
4.	"Axis Bent"	4:19
5.	"Clad with Bunk"	5:32
6.	"Pond Scum Ocean"	7:09
7.	"Shiva with Dustpan"	5:38
Total length:		40:19

== Personnel ==
Musicians:

- Ryley Walker – guitar, vocals
- Bill MacKay – guitar, piano
- Andrew Scott Young – bass, piano
- Ryan Jewell – drums, percussion
- Nancy Ives – cello (on "Rang Dizzy")
- Douglas Jenkins – cello, string arrangements (on "Shiva with Dustpan")

Technical:

- John McEntire – production, engineering, mixing
- Greg Calbi – mastering

Packaging:

- Heather Nelson – artwork
- Michael Vallera – design, layout, photography
