= Primrose Green =

Studio album by Ryley Walker
- Released: March 31, 2015
- Genres: Psychedelic folk, folk rock
- Length: 43:30
- Label: Dead Oceans

Ryley Walker chronology
All Kinds of You (2014)	Primrose Green (2015)	Golden Sings That Have Been Sung (2016)

Primrose Green is the second studio album by American musician Ryley Walker. It was released in March 2015 under Dead Oceans.

== Reception ==
Professional ratings
Aggregate scores
Source	Rating
AnyDecentMusic?	8.1/10
Metacritic	83/100
Review scores
Source	Rating
AllMusic	4/5 stars
Consequence of Sound	B+
The Guardian	4/5 stars
Mojo	4/5 stars
NME	8/10
Pitchfork	6.2/10
PopMatters	9/10
Q	4/5 stars
Record Collector	3/5 stars
Uncut	9/10

=== Accolades ===
Publication	Accolade	Year	Rank
Rough Trade	Albums of the Year 2015	2015	27

== Track listing ==
No.	Title	Length
1.	"Primrose Green"	4:06
2.	"Summer Dress"	5:10
3.	"Same Minds"	4:19
4.	"Griffith Buck's Blues"	2:47
5.	"Love Can Be Cruel"	5:03
6.	"On the Banks of the Old Kishwaukee"	4:58
7.	"Sweet Satisfaction"	6:23
8.	"The High Road"	4:48
9.	"All Kinds of You"	4:32
10.	"Hide in the Roses"	2:32
