= Emma Swift =

Australian singer-songwriter

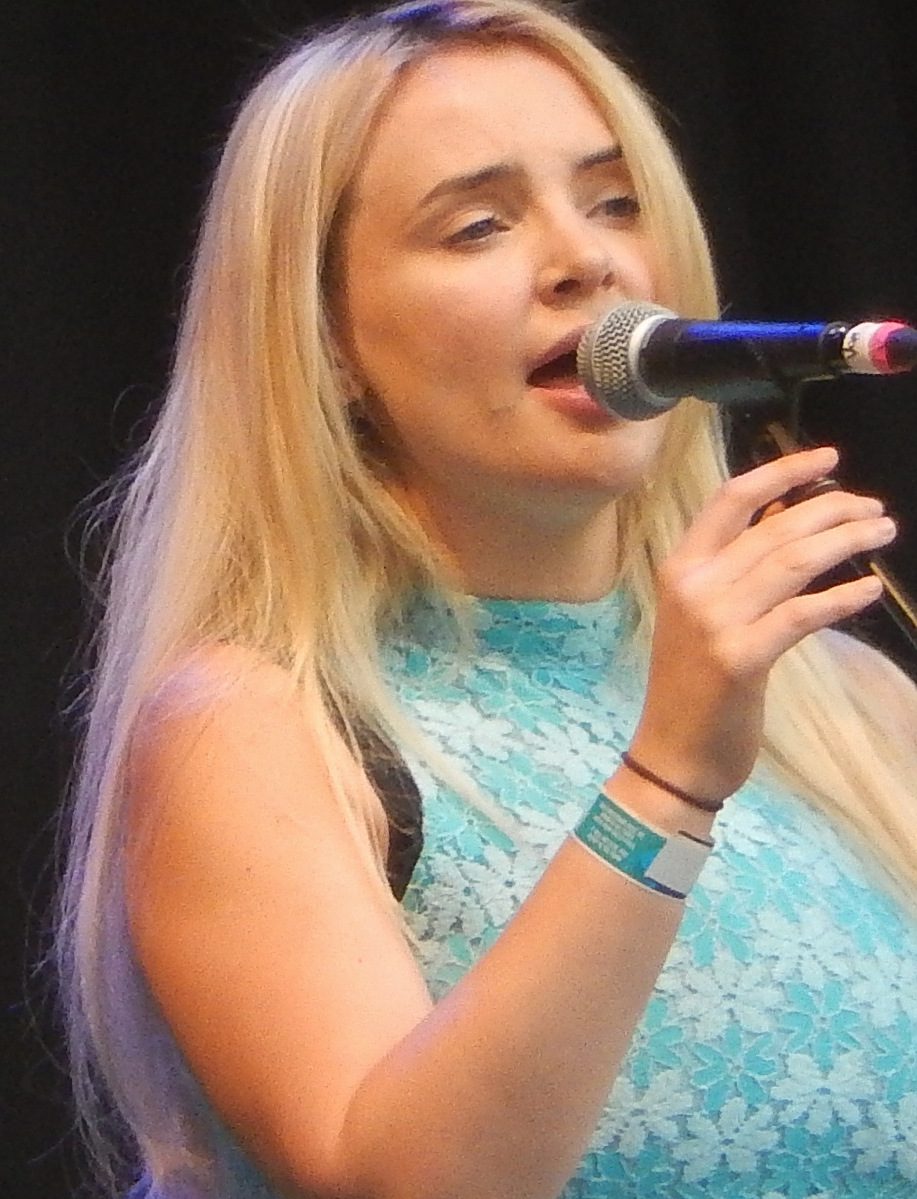
- At WOMADelaide music festival in 2015

Background information
- Born: 15 December 1981 (age 44)
- Origin: Sydney, New South Wales, Australia
- Genres: Indie, folk

Emma Swift (born 15 December 1981) is an Australian singer-songwriter. Before becoming a musician, she was a radio broadcaster, hosting Americana music show In the Pines on FBi Radio and Revelator on Double J at Australian Broadcasting Corporation in Sydney, Australia.

== Career ==
Originally from Sydney, Australia, Swift moved to Nashville, Tennessee in 2013, to pursue a career in music. Swift recorded her self-titled debut EP in Nashville with producer Anne McCue. It was released in 2014 and was nominated for the ARIA Award for Best Country Album at the ARIA Music Awards of 2014. Jeff Glorfeld from Sydney Morning Herald said "Recorded in Nashville with a top-notch crew of session players, the mellow-voiced Sydney singer avoids the usual pitfalls and excesses by enlisting fellow Aussie expat Anne McCue, a fine singer in her own right, as producer. What they deliver is set of songs free of artifice, just heartfelt music."

Swift has toured the US, Australia, UK, and Europe with Robyn Hitchcock, and they have released two 7" vinyl singles together, "Follow Your Money" in 2015 and "Love Is a Drag" in 2016, produced by Norman Blake of Teenage Fanclub. Swift also performed backing vocals along with Gillian Welch and Pat Sansone of Wilco on Hitchcock's 2017 self-titled album.

Swift opened for Ryan Adams in Australia in 2016.

In 2018, Swift released a split 7-inch single with Pony Boy (the recording pseudonym of Los Angeles singer-songwriter Marchelle Bradanini). Both musicians covered songs by Neil Young; Swift covered "Mellow My Mind," from Young's 1975 album Tonight's the Night, while Pony Boy covered "Like a Hurricane" from 1977's American Stars 'n Bars.

In 2020, Swift released an album of Bob Dylan covers, Blonde on the Tracks. Swift said "The idea for the album came about during a long depressive phase, the kind where it's hard to get out of bed and get dressed and present to the world as a high-functioning human. I was lost on all fronts no doubt, but especially creatively. I've never been a prolific writer, but this period was especially wordless. Sad, listless and desperate, I began singing Bob Dylan songs as a way to have something to wake up for. Interpreting other people's emotions is how I learned to sing and I've always enjoyed hearing Dylan's songs from a female perspective. You can learn a lot about melody and feeling by the way a singer chooses to interpret someone else's song."

In October 2020, Swift released the original single "The Soft Apocalypse" with Swift saying "It's very much about this year and this moment in time: my attempt to document what it is like to live in Trump's America in the COVID era. It's one part confession, one part pantheism and one part protest."

In 2021 she as a solo artist was inter alia part of the Newport Folk Festival in July.

== Personal life ==
Swift lives in East Nashville with her partner Robyn Hitchcock and their cats Tubby and Ringo.

== Discography ==
=== Studio albums ===
List of studio albums, with release date and label shown
Title	Details	Peak chart positions
Title	Details	AUS
Blonde on the Tracks	Released: 14 August 2020; Label: Tiny Ghost Records (TG-03); Format: CD, LP, digital download, streaming	9
The Resurrection Game	Released: 12 September 2025; Label: Tiny Ghost Records; Format: CD, LP, digital download, streaming	-

=== Extended plays ===
Title	Details
Emma Swift	Released: July 2014; Label: Laughing Outlaw (LOR167CD); Format: CD, digital download

=== Singles ===
Year	Title	Album
2015	"Follow Your Money" b/w "Motion Pictures" (with Robyn Hitchcock)	
2016	"Love Is a Drag" b/w "Life Is Change" (with Robyn Hitchcock)	
2018	"Mellow My Mind" b/w Pony Boy, "Like a Hurricane"	
2020	"I Contain Multitudes"	Blonde on the Tracks
2020	"Queen Jane Approximately"	Blonde on the Tracks
2020	"You're a Big Girl Now"	Blonde on the Tracks
2020	"The Soft Apocalypse"	TBA
2020	"Simple Twist of Fate"	Blonde on the Tracks
2020	"One of Us Must Know (Sooner or Later)"	Blonde on the Tracks

== Awards and nominations ==
=== AIR Awards ===
The Australian Independent Record Awards (known colloquially as the AIR Awards) is an annual awards night to recognise, promote and celebrate the success of Australia's Independent Music sector.

Year	Nominee / work	Award	Result	Ref.
2021	Blonde on the Tracks	Best Independent Blues and Roots Album or EP	Nominated	

=== ARIA Music Awards ===
The ARIA Music Awards is an annual awards ceremony that recognises excellence, innovation, and achievement across all genres of Australian music. Swift has been nominated for one award.

Year	Nominee / work	Award	Result	Ref.
2014	Emma Swift	Best Country Album	Nominated	
