= Rabbit Songs =

Studio album by Hem
- Released: June 11, 2002
- Genre: Country, folk
- Length: 45:45
- Label: DreamWorks
- Producer: Gary Maurer & Dan Messé

Hem chronology
Rabbit Songs (2002)	I'm Talking with My Mouth (2002)

Professional ratings
Review scores
Source	Rating
AllMusic	4/5 stars

Rabbit Songs is the debut album by Hem. It was released on June 11, 2002, on DreamWorks Records. The album was featured on NPR's All Songs Considered following its release, and the song "Half Acre" was later used in a Liberty Mutual commercial.

The album was remastered for its twenty-fifth anniversary and released on vinyl November 28, 2025. This version included an additional song, "St. Charlene," a Hem song from the same era previously released only on [Birds, Beasts, & Flowers (EP)|an EP].

== Track listing ==
All songs written by Dan Messé, except when noted.

1. "Lord, Blow the Moon Out Please" (Traditional) - 0:26
2. "When I Was Drinking" - 3:44
3. "Half Acre" - 3:23
4. "Burying Song" - 1:13
5. "Betting On Trains" - 2:44
6. "Leave Me Here" - 3:50
7. "All That I'm Good For" - 3:24
8. "Idle (The Rabbit Song)" - 3:44
9. "Stupid Mouth Shut" - 3:24
10. "Lazy Eye" (Messé/Gary Maurer) - 2:26
11. "Sailor" - 3:00
12. "Polly's Dress" - 1:12
13. "Night Like a River" (Steve Curtis) - 3:47
14. "The Cuckoo" (Traditional) - 2:57
15. "Waltz" - 2:41
16. "Horsey" (Messé/Maurer) - 3:34

== Personnel ==
- Sally Ellyson - vocals
- Dan Messé - piano, accordion, glockenspiel
- Gary Maurer - guitar, mandolin
- Steve Curtis - guitar, mandolin, banjo, back-up vocals
- Catherine Popper - double bass, back-up vocals
- Mark Brotter - drums
- Bob Hoffnar - pedal steel guitar
- Heather Zimmerman - violin
