= The Autumn Defense =

American indie rock band

- Genres: Alternative country; baroque pop
- Years active: 1999–present
- Labels: Broadmoor; Arena Rock Recording Co.; Yep Roc
- Members: John Stirratt; Pat Sansone
- Website: theautumndefense.com

The Autumn Defense is an American band composed of multi-instrumentalists John Stirratt and Pat Sansone.

== History ==
The Autumn Defense began as a side project for John Stirratt, best known for his work as bassist for alt-country bands Wilco and Uncle Tupelo. In 1999, Stirratt began collaborating with friend Pat Sansone, known for his work with Joseph Arthur and Josh Rouse, to produce 1960s-style rock/pop. Their debut album The Green Hour was released on Stirratt's own Broadmoor label, with Stirratt doing the bulk of the writing while Sansone focused on the technical recording aspects. The band did some light touring around the United States in between other projects.

The duo reconvened in 2002 to begin work on their follow-up album, the critically acclaimed Circles released in 2003 on the Arena Rock Recording Co. label. Circles saw the introduction of Pat Sansone as a songwriter in the project, in addition to arrangement and production duties. The band received press in Mojo, No Depression, and the Chicago Tribune and supported the release with a successful club tour throughout America and Europe.

In 2004, after the release of Circles Sansone joined Stirratt as part of Wilco's six-man lineup, in which he still remains.

Stirratt released an album with his twin sister Laurie, entitled Arabella in 2004, which featured several Autumn Defense collaborators including drummer Greg Wieczorek, bassist Brad Jones, and guitarist John Pirruccello. The album was released on Broadmoor Records.

The band's third, self-titled record was released in the US January 16, 2007 on Broadmoor while Broken Horse records issued The Autumn Defense in the UK/Europe on February 25, 2008. This was their first album to feature equal songwriting and lead vocalist duties shared by both Stirratt and Sansone, which has continued ever since. The band embarked on a US tour in February and March 2007.

The Autumn Defense released their fourth LP titled Once Around in November 2010 on Yep Roc Records.

Their fifth LP, entitled Fifth, was released on January 28, 2014, on Yep Roc, and features the core of their live touring band including drummer Greg Wieczorek, bassist James Haggerty, and John Pirruccello on guitar and pedal steel.

UK based vinyl only reissue label Be With Records has re-released three of The Autumn Defense's albums on vinyl LP. The Autumn Defense (Self-Titled) in 2015, The Green Hour in 2016, and Circles in 2018.

== Discography ==
- The Green Hour (CD/LP) – Broadmoor – 2001
- Circles (CD/LP) – Arena Rock Recording Co. – 2003
- Birds, Beasts, & Flowers EP (split with Hem) – Arena Rock Recording Co. – 2003
- The Autumn Defense (CD) – Broadmoor – 2007
- Once Around (CD/LP) – Yep Roc – 2010
- Fifth (CD) – Yep Roc – 2014
- Here and Nowhere (2025)
