= Birds, Beasts, & Flowers (EP) =

2004 EP by The Autumn Defense and Hem

Birds, Beasts, and Flowers

EP by Hem and the Autumn Defense
- Released: September 28, 2004
- Recorded: Nov 2003 – May 2004
- Genre: Indie rock, folk music
- Label: Arena Rock

Hem chronology
| Eveningland (2004) | Birds, Beasts, and Flowers (2004) | No Word from Tom (2006) |

The Autumn Defense chronology
| Circles (2003) | Birds, Beasts, and Flowers (2004) | The Autumn Defense (2007) |

Professional ratings
Review scores
| Source | Rating |
|---|---|
| AllMusic | link |
| Pitchfork | 6.8/10 link |

Birds, Beasts, & Flowers is a split EP between indie rock band the Autumn Defense and indie folk band Hem. It was released on September 28, 2004 on the Arena Rock Recording Co. label.

== Track listing ==
1. "Half Acre" (Hem) – 3:33
2. "Bluebirds Fall" (The Autumn Defense) – 4:36
3. "Pacific Street" (Hem) – 3:04
4. "You Know Where I Live" (The Autumn Defense) – 2:59
5. "St. Charlene" (Hem) – 4:11
6. "Mayday" (The Autumn Defense) – 4:48
