= Ryley Walker =

American singer-songwriter

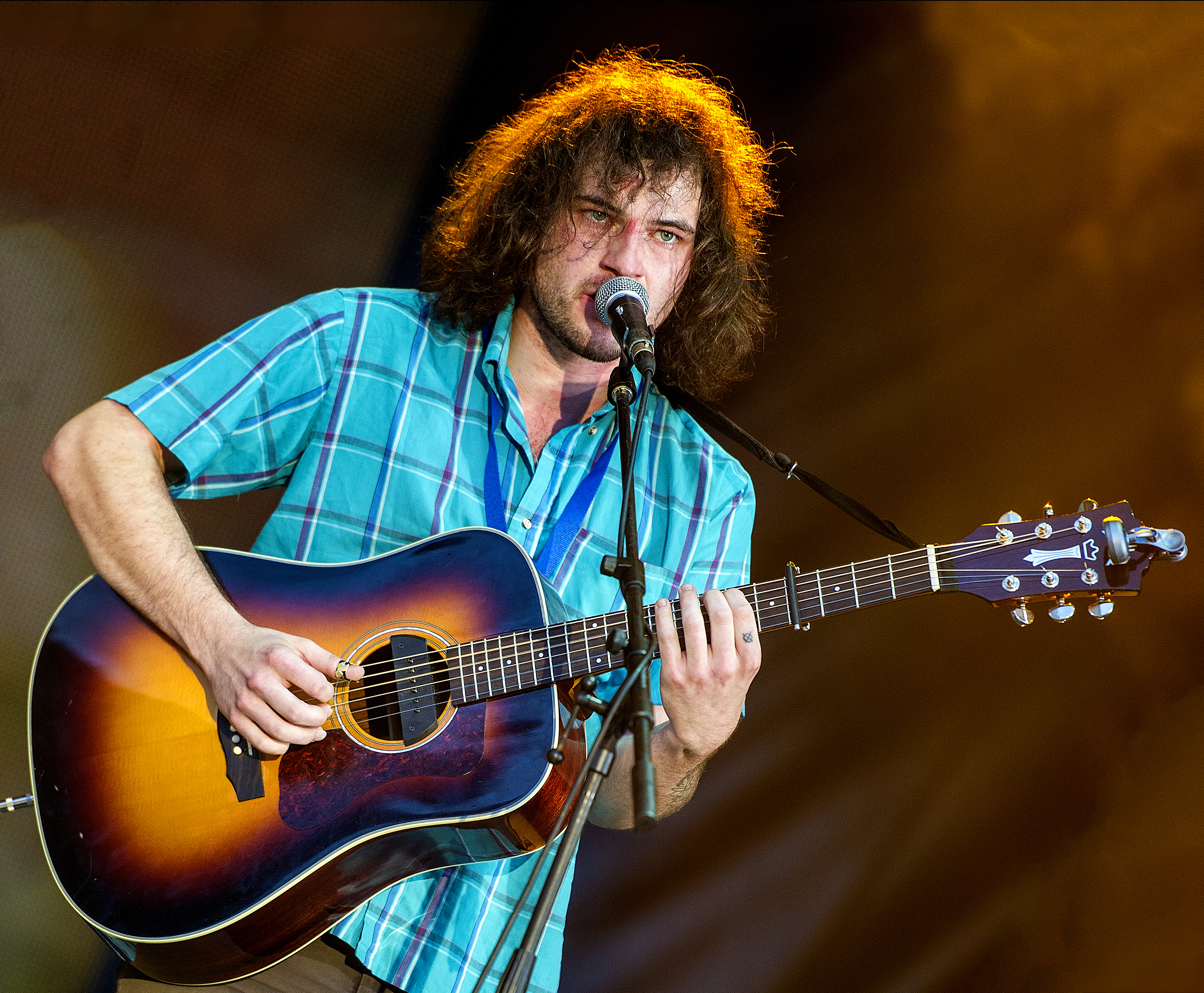
- Walker performing in 2016

Background information
- Born: July 21, 1989 (age 37); Rockford, Illinois, U.S.
- Origin: Chicago, Illinois, U.S.
- Genres: Psychedelic folk; folk jazz; indie rock; progressive folk
- Occupation: Singer-songwriter
- Instruments: Vocals; guitar
- Years active: 2011–present
- Labels: Plustapes; Addenda; Tompkins Square; Dead Oceans; Whistler; Drag City; Dull Tools; Thrill Jockey; Husky Pants
- Website: ryleywalker.com

Ryley Walker (born July 21, 1989) is an American singer-songwriter and guitarist from Rockford, Illinois.

== Biography ==
Walker grew up in a working-class family in Rockford. He and critics have cited the band Genesis and singer-songwriter Nick Drake as his early influences.

Walker began his career in Chicago's independent music scene after moving there in the early 2010s, releasing several cassette EPs and a vinyl EP. In 2014, he released his debut album for the Tompkins Square label, followed by Primrose Green, released on Dead Oceans in 2015. Backing musicians Walker employed on Primrose Green include several noted Chicago jazz and experimental musicians, such as Fred Lonberg-Holm.

Also in 2015, Walker released an instrumental album, recorded in collaboration with fellow Chicago musician Bill MacKay, entitled Land of Plenty. It was recorded live during a January 2015 residency at The Whistler nightclub in Chicago. The songs on the album were taken from the last two shows of the residency, on January 25 and 30. MacKay's guitar was recorded on the left channel, and Walker's guitar was recorded on the right channel. Their instruments converge in the center. MacKay played 6-string guitar, requinto, and glass slide, while Walker played 6 & 12-string guitars. The album's sound was described as fingerstyle ballads, psychedelic waltzes, and raga-inspired blues. The duo's second album, Spiderbeetlebee, was released by Drag City in 2017. MacKay was a recurring member of Walker's live band between 2017 and 2021. He also played electric guitar on Walker's 2018 album Deafman Glance.

On August 19, 2016, Walker released his fourth solo album, Golden Sings That Have Been Sung, which was yet another change in his evolving sound. His fifth is Deafman Glance, released in May 2018. Walker released The Lillywhite Sessions, an album of covers of the aforementioned Dave Matthews Band album. In 2021, Walker released Deep Fried Grandeur, a live album with the Tokyo band Kikagaku Moyo, and Course in Fable, his sixth solo album of original music, both on his own Husky Pants Records label.

As of 2021, Walker had gotten sober and had moved from New York City to Vermont. As of 2022, Walker had moved back to New York.

== Discography ==
=== Albums ===
- All Kinds of You (Tompkins Square Records, 2014)
- Primrose Green (Dead Oceans, 2015)
- Land of Plenty (Whistler Records, 2015), with Bill MacKay
- Golden Sings That Have Been Sung (Dead Oceans, 2016)
- Cannots (Dead Oceans, 2016), with Charles Rumback
- Spiderbeetlebee (Drag City, 2017), with Bill MacKay
- Deafman Glance (Dead Oceans, 2018)
- The Lillywhite Sessions (covers from a 2001 Dave Matthews Band album) (2018)
- Little Common Twist (Thrill Jockey, 2019), with Charles Rumback
- Deep Fried Grandeur (Husky Pants Records, 2021) with Kikagaku Moyo
- Course in Fable (Husky Pants Records, 2021)
- It'll Sound Different Once We Get Some Bodies in the Room (Husky Pants Records, 2023), with Jeff Tobias
- Bird Bath (2023)
- Reine Fiske/Ryley Walker (2024), with Reine Fiske
- County Fair, Going In Alone (2025), with Andrew Scott Young

=== EPs ===
- The Evidence of Things Unseen (Plustapes, 2011)
- Of Deathly Premonitions (with Daniel Bachman) (Plustapes, 2011)
- West Wind (Tompkins Square, 2013)
- So Certain EP (Husky Pants Records, 2022)
