= Pat Sansone =

American musician

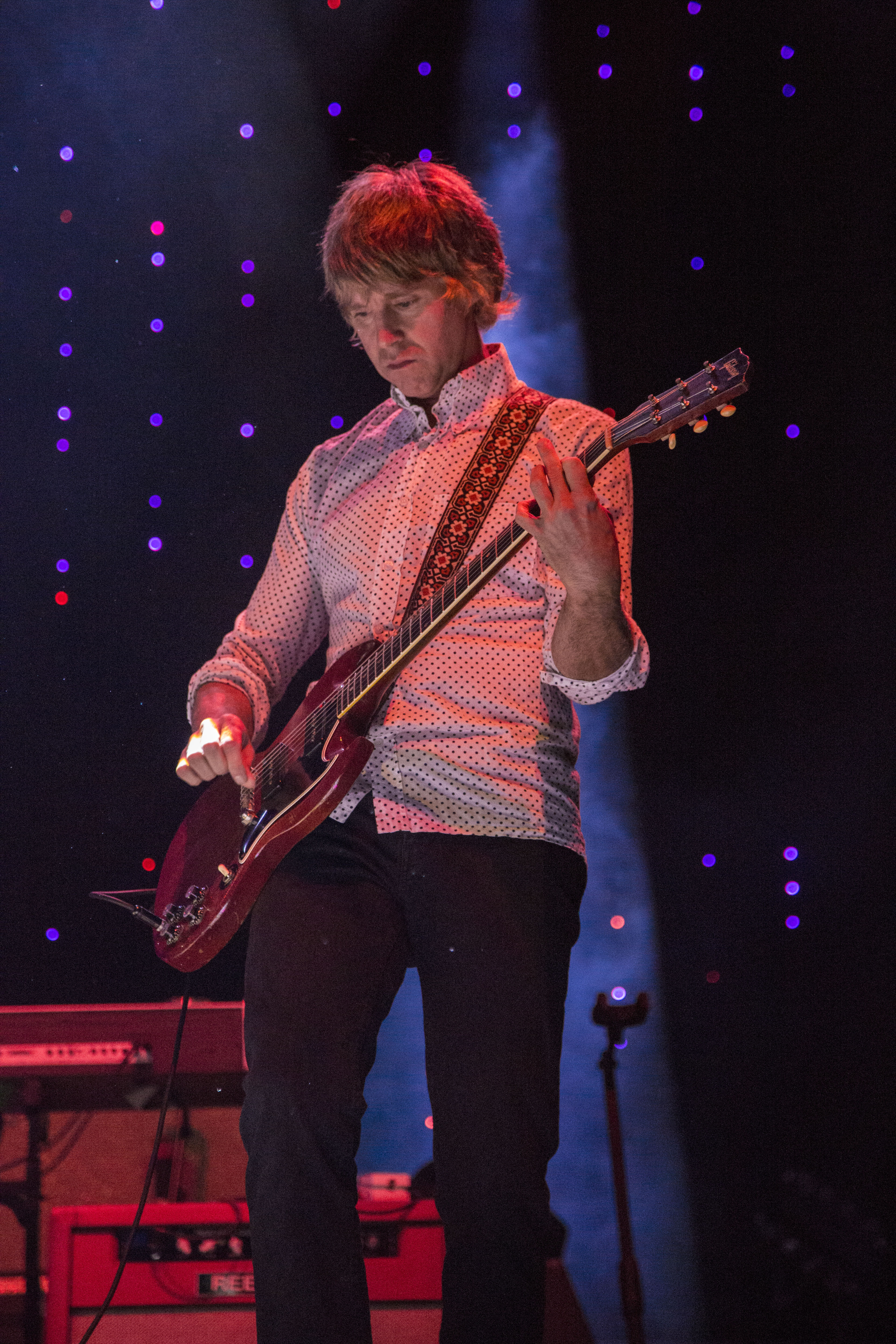
- Sansone performing in 2015

Background information
- Born: Patrick Anthony Sansone; June 21, 1969 (age 57); Meridian, Mississippi, U.S.
- Occupation: Musician
- Instruments: Guitar, keyboards, percussion, harpsichord

Signature
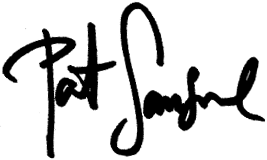

Patrick Anthony Sansone is a Grammy-nominated singer, songwriter, musician, and music producer. He is a member of Wilco, The Autumn Defense, and Mellotron Variations and has worked with Jonathan Wilson, Andrew Bird, Jamie Lidell, and others.

== Early life ==
Patrick Anthony Sansone was born in Meridian, Mississippi. He grew up in a musical family and began working in a recording studio at the age of 14. His father ran a concert venue in Meridian, MS. As a teenager, he was influenced by The Beatles, The Byrds, The Who, and especially Big Star among others. Sansone attended The University of Southern Mississippi, where he met Will Martin and Eddie Bo McRaney and formed the trio, Beagle Voyage. Later he played with Stretch Armstrong and then formed the band, Birdy.

== The Autumn Defense ==
Sansone's own project The Autumn Defense was formed in New Orleans in 1999 with friend John Stirratt of Wilco. The band has released five full-length albums: The Green Hour in 2000, Circles in 2003, the self-titled The Autumn Defense in 2006, Once Around in 2010, and "Fifth" in 2014.

== Wilco ==
In 2004, Sansone joined Wilco before a tour in support of their album A Ghost Is Born, following the departure of multi-instrumentalist Leroy Bach. On tour, Sansone plays guitar, keyboard, maracas, and several other instruments, as well as singing backup vocals. He was also involved in the writing and recording of Wilco's 2007 release Sky Blue Sky, 2009's Wilco, and The Whole Love in 2011.

Pat Sansone received a co-production credit for his work on The Whole Love. He also received credit for arranging strings for the track "Black Moon".

== Other projects ==
Sansone has lived in New Orleans, Nashville, New York, and Chicago working as a producer and studio musician. He has contributed to albums by Joseph Arthur, Andrew Bird, Josh Rouse, Mavis Staples, Swan Dive, Jenifer Jackson, Ryan Adams, The Clientele, The Milk Carton Kids, Karen Elson, Jonathan Wilson and others.

In 2009, Sansone made a guest appearance on Dawes's album North Hills. In 2010 he appeared on the albums Familial by Radiohead drummer Phil Selway, Compass by Jamie Lidell, and You Are Not Alone by Mavis Staples.

In 2010, Sansone released a book of photography called 100 Polaroids. The book is a collection of Polaroid photographs taken with an SX-70 camera. Sansone began photographing with the SX-70 in 2006, and shot extensively over the next several years while traveling with Wilco and The Autumn Defense. The book is self-published by his own Sansonica Books. Prints of his works can be found at NAVA Contemporary and Citizen Parlor.

In 2011, Sansone produced the album "Korp Sole Roller" by Chicago-based artist Liam Hayes. The album was released in 2014 on the Japanese label After Hours, and then received a vinyl LP reissue in 2019 on the UK label Be With Records.

In April 2012, Sansone and Josh Shapera co-produced an EP, Weird Weather, for the Chicago-based band Future Monarchs. In 2014, Sansone and Shapera produced the album Deserters for Future Monarchs.

In 2013, Sansone contributed string arrangements for the album Fanfare by Jonathan Wilson.

In 2015, Sansone and Shapera produced the album Ocean of Birds for duo Max Hatt/Edda Glass.

In 2016, Sansone contributed acoustic guitar to the album "Rainbow Ends" by Emitt Rhodes

In 2017, Sansone and Fernando Perdomo co-produced the third album for artist Linda Perhacs, I'm A Harmony. A single was self-released in 2016 called "The Dancer" which features Sansone on Mellotron and backing vocals.

In 2018, Sansone mixed two singles for Nashville-based band Sun Seeker, "Night's Alright" and "Good Year." He produced a full-length album for Sun Seeker which is yet to be released.

Also in 2018, Sansone produced the album "Primetime Illusion" for Wisconsin-based songwriter Trapper Schoepp.

Also in 2018, Sansone was the featured vocalist on the single "California Moon" by Fernando Perdomo also featured on his album "Fernando Perdomo Has Lost His Voice"

In 2019, Sansone appeared on a single released by Robyn Hitchcock featuring the songs "Take Off Your Bandages" and "Sunday Never Comes." Sansone was featured on bass, keyboards, and backing vocals.

Pat Sansone co-produced the 2020 released album "Dixie Blur" by Jonathan Wilson and contributed on bass, acoustic guitar, Mellotron, synth, vibes and background vocals.

Since 2020, Sansone has hosted the 'Baroque Down Palace' show on Memphis' WYXR radio station.

Sansone produced and played multiple instruments on Emma Swift's album of Bob Dylan covers, Blonde on the Tracks, recorded between 2017 and 2020 in Nashville, Tennessee and also featuring Robyn Hitchcock. The album reached the top 10 on the Australian chart.

In 2024 Centripetal Force released Infinity Mirrors, an album of Sansone's synthesizer compositions, with "interesting variety and plenty to stimulate the listener" (Poetic Justice Magazine).
