= The Visitor (Jim O'Rourke album) =

Studio album by Jim O'Rourke
- Released: September 8, 2009
- Recorded: 2009
- Studio: Steamroom (Tokyo)
- Genre: Folk; orchestral pop; progressive rock
- Length: 38:03
- Label: Drag City
- Producer: Jim O'Rourke

Jim O'Rourke chronology
Halfway to a Threeway (1999)	The Visitor (2009)	Simple Songs (2015)

The Visitor is an instrumental album by American musician Jim O'Rourke. It was released on Drag City in 2009 on CD and LP, but not digitally by O'Rourke's request. O'Rourke played every instrument on the album, and it was all recorded in his home in Tokyo. It marks his first proper studio album in eight years since Insignificance, released in 2001, and is intended to be a continuation of that album, Eureka, and Bad Timing.

== Critical reception ==
Professional ratings
Aggregate scores
Source	Rating
Metacritic	73/100
Review scores
Source	Rating
AllMusic	4/5 stars
Beats per Minute	90%
Consequence of Sound	A+
Fact	9/10
The List	3/5 stars
Mojo	3/5 stars
Pitchfork	8.3/10
Q	3/5 stars
Tiny Mix Tapes	4/5 marks
XLR8R	8.5/10

The Visitor received very positive reviews from contemporary music critics. At Metacritic, which assigns a normalized rating out of 100 to reviews from mainstream critics, the album received an average score of 73, based on 5 reviews, which indicates "generally favorable reviews".

Pitchfork Media gave the album a very positive review, stating, "Given its patient development and refusal to climax, The Visitor runs the risk of being labeled boring and bland. Given its use of common instruments and techniques (a cymbal scraped with a drumstick constitutes the album's most "out" sound), it runs a high risk of being labeled pedestrian, too, as if O'Rourke has taken all of his experimental tendencies and finally reduced them into an adult-contemporary instrumental. Ultimately, that's about as silly as it sounds: The Visitor is a defiant record in both sound and spirit. The reluctance of O'Rourke and Drag City to release The Visitor as a digital download, for instance, rebels against our need for instant gratification. You have to work a bit to hear it. Symbolically, it's a potent act for such an anticipated release, even if bit torrents, RapidShare, and the ilk mean it's little more than a symbol. And O'Rourke's request that you listen out loud, loudly, means that you give it your attention, that you let it fill the room with sound. After all, this is soft music—and graceful and complicated and rich, too. While it might sound polite, though, it's not to be heard passively during your morning walk to work.

=== Year-end rankings ===
Publication	Rank	Ref
Consequence of Sound	17	
Pitchfork	39	
Tiny Mix Tapes	22	
Uncut	30	

== Track listing ==
No.	Title	Length
1.	"The Visitor"	38:03
