= Bad Timing =

- Theatrical poster
- Directed by: Nicolas Roeg
- Written by: Yale Udoff
- Based on: Ho Tentato Di Vivere by Costanzo Costantini
- Produced by: Jeremy Thomas
- Starring: Art Garfunkel; Theresa Russell; Harvey Keitel; Denholm Elliott; Daniel Massey
- Cinematography: Anthony B. Richmond
- Edited by: Tony Lawson
- Music by: Richard Hartley
- Production company: Recorded Picture Company
- Distributed by: Rank Film Distributors
- Release date: 10 April 1980
- Running time: 122 minutes
- Country: United Kingdom
- Language: English
- Budget: $5 million

Bad Timing (Note: In the United States, the film was released under the stylized alternate title Bad Timing/A Sensual Obsession.) is a 1980 British psychological drama film. It was directed by Nicolas Roeg and starred Art Garfunkel, Theresa Russell, Harvey Keitel, and Denholm Elliott. Set in Vienna and largely told through nonlinear flashbacks, the film chronicles the torrid affair between two Americans—Milena (Russell), a depressive young woman, and Alex (Garfunkel), a psychoanalyst—as uncovered by a detective (Keitel) investigating Milena's apparent suicide attempt.

The film was adapted by the American playwright Yale Udoff from the Italian story Ho Tentato Di Vivere by Costanzo Costantini. Bad Timing was filmed in the spring of 1979 on location in Vienna, London, Morocco, and New York City.

The film was controversial upon its release, being branded "a sick film made by sick people for sick people" by its own distributor, the Rank Organisation, whose executives were so disturbed by it that they removed their logo from the film's opening. In the United States, it was given an X rating which its producers unsuccessfully appealed, resulting in the decision to release the film there without a rating. It went unreleased on home video in the United States until 2005 when The Criterion Collection released a DVD edition, though it did attain a cult following with American audiences due to its frequent airings on television through the 1980s.

The film won the People's Choice Award at the 5th Toronto International Film Festival.

== Plot ==
In Cold War Vienna, Milena Flaherty, a young American woman, is rushed to the emergency room after apparently overdosing in a suicide attempt. With her is Alex Linden, an American psychoanalyst who lives in the city working as a university teacher. While doctors and nurses fight to save Milena's life, an investigator, Netusil, begins investigating the incident. Through fragmented flashbacks, the narrative depicts the story of Alex and Milena's romance.

After meeting her at a party, Alex is enchanted by Milena, a sophisticated but free-spirited military brat. The two begin a whirlwind affair, but shortly into the relationship, Milena is revealed to suffer from severe depression and be married to a much older man, Stefan, whom she occasionally visits across the border in Bratislava. Though Alex initially enjoys Milena's free-spirited lifestyle, he soon becomes embittered by it, as it includes impulsive promiscuity and heavy drinking. Alex begins stalking Milena, and eventually confronts her about her marriage to Stefan. She insists that the marriage is simply platonic, and that she and Stefan are no longer in love. Despite this, Alex begins researching into Stefan's past, and inquires with local government agencies about how Milena can proceed with a divorce, which she refuses.

Alex's jealousy of Milena only continues to grow, and he begins to resent her. After one argument, Milena forcefully impels Alex to have sex with her to sate him, and is disgusted with herself after. In one incident, when the couple vacation in Morocco, their vehicle breaks down, and they hitch a ride from two Moroccan men. Alex is left in the bed of the truck, while Milena sits between the two men, flirting with them during the drive, which Alex keenly observes. Upon arriving in Ouarzazate, Alex suggests that he and Milena return to the United States where he can take a teaching position in New York City, but she insists that they live "in the moment."

Milena begins to question her and Alex's romance when she finds evidence that he has been treating her as a case study. Later, Alex confronts her about a photograph in her apartment that he has obsessed over, which shows her at a lake with another man. She tells him the photo is of her and her late brother, taken in California years prior, but Alex does not believe her. The following morning, Alex confronts a drunken Milena outside her apartment, telling her he cannot bear the thought of her with another man. When she defiantly renounces him, he slaps her. Later, Milena invites him back to her apartment, only to taunt him in kabuki makeup, mockingly presenting herself as the "new Milena." When he storms out, Milena screams at him from her balcony, hurling objects at him onto the street below. The following night, Milena leaves Alex a drunken voice message suggesting she wants to die.

In the present, as doctors attempt to revive the dying Milena, Netusil pieces together the chain of events, culminating in an interview with Alex, who presents himself simply as Milena's friend. Uncovering timeline inconsistencies in Alex's story, Netusil determines what actually occurred: Alex, after finding Milena overdosing on poison in her apartment, looked on as she slowly collapsed, and subsequently raped her once she lost consciousness. Though Netusil has physical evidence suggesting Milena was raped, he is unable to elicit a confession from Alex. Stefan arrives, and reveals Milena has survived the overdose following a life-saving tracheotomy. Alex departs without repercussion, but, before he leaves, Stefan comments that he must love Milena more than his own dignity.

Some time later, in New York, Alex sees Milena passing by in front of the Waldorf-Astoria hotel as he enters a taxi. He calls out to her, and she briefly turns toward him, revealing her tracheotomy scar, before impassively walking away.

== Cast ==
- Art Garfunkel as Alex Linden
- Theresa Russell as Milena Flaherty
- Harvey Keitel as Inspector Netusil
- Denholm Elliott as Stefan Vognic
- Daniel Massey as Foppish Man
- Dana Gillespie as Amy Miller
- William Hootkins as Colonel Taylor
- Eugene Lipinski as Hospital Policeman
- George Roubicek as Policeman #1
- Stefan Gryff as Policeman #2
- Sevilla Delofski as Czech Receptionist
- Robert Walker as Konrad
- Gertan Klauber as Ambulance Man
- Ania Marson as Dr. Schneider
- Lex van Delden as Young Doctor

== Production ==
=== Development ===
The film was based on an Italian story by Constanzo Constantini called Ho Tentato Di Vivere. Roeg was shown it in the mid-1970s by producer Carlo Ponti. “It was given to me as a kind of longish idea, translated from Italian. It was very different, about two Italians, but it was the same basic idea, about that condition of man and woman."

The story was adapted into a script by Yale Udoff, an American playwright. Udoff recalled: "It was about a wealthy Roman playboy and his girlfriend, and it was like an Alberto Moravia novel, but very bad Moravia, with a feel of the sixties. Although we changed almost everything, it did have a few elements we kept—it had an investigation into a murder. What interested Roeg was the idea of a couple in extremis, a man and a woman battling." The original screenplay and working title for the film was Illusions.

Roeg recalled "Yale and I worked very hard on it and we knew what we were going to do in terms of who the people were. But you can’t write every shot... The script is only one part of a film. I shoot a lot of stuff. With Bad Timing, I got back from Vienna and found that the set had been dressed. I love set dressing because to me it is part of the person. So I went out and bought books and things, to be part of the life of Helena, and re-dressed the set."

The film was one of the series of movies greenlit by Tony Williams at the Rank Organisation, who were increasing their production output. Rank made eight films over two years, being mostly conservative choices such as the 1978 film The Thirty-Nine Steps, the third adaptation of the 1915 novel. Bad Timing was the most unusual of the slate of films.

Roeg said "I thought everybody would respond to" the film. "It was about obsessive love and physical obsession. I thought this must touch everyone, from university dons down."

=== Casting ===
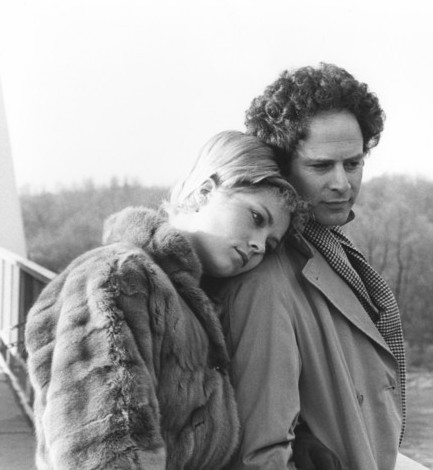
Russell and Garfunkel as Milena and Alex

Roeg originally wanted to cast Bruno Ganz and Sissy Spacek in the leads. He eventually cast musician Art Garfunkel (Roeg had successfully used pop stars in his films Performance and The Man Who Fell to Earth) and Theresa Russell, whom Roeg later married. Roeg had envisioned Russell in the part of Milena, having been impressed by her performance in The Last Tycoon (1976). The role of the inspector was rejected by Albert Finney and Malcolm McDowell was unavailable; Harvey Keitel was cast three days before filming.

=== Filming ===
The film was shot over a ten-week period, with principal photography beginning in Vienna on 19 March 1979. After five weeks were completed in Vienna, filming continued through the spring of that year in London. Additional filming took place in Morocco, and finally, in New York City. Four days into the initial shoot, actors Garfunkel and Russell "begged" Roeg to leave the project. By Roeg's account:

Theresa came first. She said, 'I don't think I'm up to this. I'm terribly nervous. Please let me leave.' I said, 'No. I won't let you. I'm glad you feel that way.' Then I asked Art in. I told them, 'This isn't like another movie. We're shooting fragments of scenes; there's nothing to rehearse. We're in a city none of us knows, an empty landscape. I must ask you to trust that I know where I'm going. It's a maze, but there is an end to it.' We had some Martinis, and they agreed. Somehow, it was a release. I felt all right about pushing them further and further.

Garfunkel would later comment on the film's emotionally strenuous production: "I killed myself for that movie. I truly went all out to do as best I could. That film was no ordinary experience. Nick (Roeg) is no ordinary filmmaker, and the story is no ordinary story. What happened in my life during that film is no ordinary happening." Roeg recalled that while he was making the film, "Art Garfunkel came up to me and said he realized he was really playing me. But I told him that he was only part of it. I challenged him to decipher when I was wearing the trousers and when I was wearing the dress." During filming, Garfunkel's girlfriend, Laurie Bird, committed suicide in New York. Roeg later said the film "fucked up more people in my crew than anything else I’ve done. I know five people whose lives were turned over by that movie, including the cameraman, producer and executive producer. I’m kind of glad it got a limited release."

Near the end of the shoot, author Richard Bach sued the film's distributor, Rank Film Distributors, alleging that its title, Illusions, posed "unfair competition" against his recently released novel of the same name. Bach ultimately dropped the case after Roeg and the production company agreed to change the film's title to Bad Timing.

=== Post-production ===
While the film's screenplay was written in chronological order, significant editing was undertaken in post-production to center the narrative around Inspector Netusil's investigation into Milena's alleged suicide attempt, presenting the events leading up to the event in a fragmented, nonlinear manner. Like with many of Roeg's films, it notably features cross-cutting to link two different timelines of events.

Roeg elaborated that the film "had a curious effect on people—I sort of understood afterwards why it wasn't good for the company. Funnily enough, while it was being made, someone said to me: 'You know, they're not going to eat this Nic, because you're scratching surfaces that people probably don't want to have exposed.' It was only towards the end, when we were cutting it and we showed it to the musician, who looks at the rough cut. And he said: 'Three years ago, I wouldn't have been able to work on this movie because I kept seeing myself on screen there, I was in that trap, in that hole'."

== Music ==
The film's score was composed by Richard Hartley. It also features a number of other songs as part of its soundtrack:

- "Berceuse" by Vernon Midgley
- "Dreaming My Dreams" by Billy Kinsley
- "Time Out" by Zoot Money
- "An Invitation to the Blues" by Tom Waits
- "I'll Be Seeing You" by Billie Holiday
- "The Koln Concert" by Keith Jarrett
- "Who Are You" by The Who
- "It's the Same Old Story" by Billie Holiday
- "Delusion of the Fury" by Harry Partch

== Release ==
Bad Timing was first shown at the Berlin International Film Festival in February 1980, and premiered in London on 10 April 1980. The film was later shown at the Toronto International Film Festival on 12 September 1980.

In the United States, the film was given an X rating by the Motion Picture Association of America, which was appealed by Roeg. American film critics Charles Champlin and Judith Crist spoke on behalf of Roeg regarding the appeal, but it was unsuccessful; as a result, the film's producers chose to release the film in the United States without a rating.

It screened at the British Film Festival in Manhattan on 21 September 1980 before being released citywide in New York City on 22 September 1980. A platform release expanded throughout the country in the fall of 1980, in major cities such as Los Angeles, Portland, Detroit, Philadelphia, and Boston. It was released in the United States under the slightly altered title Bad Timing/A Sensual Obsession. The film was marketed with the tagline: "A Terrifying Love Story".

=== Home media ===
On 27 September 2005, the film was released on DVD by The Criterion Collection. This was the first time that it had received an official home video release in the United States. As of 2025, the Criterion DVD is out of print.

In the United Kingdom, Network released the film on Blu-ray on 26 January 2015.

== Reception ==
=== Box office ===
During its opening week at the Sutton Theater in New York City, the film earned $41,338.

=== Critical reaction ===
==== Contemporary ====
Bad Timing received mixed reviews from film critics, with some finding it brilliant, and others, tasteless. Roeg recalled of the film's divisive response: "I hoped that people would love it, and it was received very angrily. After one screening in Hollywood, two friends didn't speak to me for five years. And I was seeing one for dinner that evening." The film's British distributor, Rank, were appalled by what they saw; one executive called it "a sick film made by sick people for sick people". In response, they removed the Rank logo from all UK prints of the film. John Coleman in the New Statesman gave it a very bad review: "[it has] an overall style which plays merry hell with chronology".

At the United Kingdom premiere, film critic David Robinson in The Times praised Roeg as "a director of panache and individuality, and with an ability to fascinate and compel the attention," and wrote about the unusual editing and the carefully staged scenes: "In other hands all this might only be deception and distraction, but through these fragmented elements Roeg and his ingenious writer Yale Udoff creates a perfectly coherent and intriguing central narrative and relationship." The Observer's Philip French remarked the film's technical brilliance, calling it "a dazzling mosaic, a virtuoso exercise in editing that moves back and forth in time, producing an astonishing range of effects and associations."

Among American critics, Janet Maslin of The New York Times was unimpressed by the film, writing that it is "so jumbled it lacks as steady rhythm, and the story offers few clear highs or lows," and citing this as a trademark feature of Roeg's work. Bob Hicks, writing for The Oregon Journal, conversely praised the film for its narrative style, declaring it "a stylistic triumph, a crackerjack detective story and a marvel of movie voyeurism." Charles Champlin of the Los Angeles Times also discussed the film's unique narrative style, but felt the storytelling was "more earthbound", adding that Roeg's "command of his images and his majestic manipulation of time have produced an engrossing study of a relationship and of obsessive jealousy."

Michael Blowen of The Boston Globe praised the performances of Russell and Garfunkel, and described the film as: "Challenging and terrifying... Like a nightmare over which you have no control, Bad Timing weaves timeless images that don't disappear when you leave the theater." The Detroit Free Press critic Jack Mathews commented on the film's narrative lapses and visual storytelling, writing: "Good movies are supposed to leave you thinking, and if thinking about incongruities counts, Bad Timing is a good one. Certainly, it is visually interesting and an intellectual challenge."

Ginger Varney, writing for LA Weekly, favorably compared Russell's performance to that of Louise Brooks in Pandora's Box (1929), an association also made by The Oregonian film critic Ted Mahar.

==== Retrospective ====
Bernard Rose later said the film contains moments "that are so daring – not daring because they’re explosive, but because they’re so raw and uncomfortable. It’s one of the great films about what we now call co-dependency. But Nic does it in the city of Freud, and in this wonderful style. It’s a pseudo-detective story, which really works because you’re analysing their relationship rather than watching it and getting involved with it." Kim Newman, reviewing the film for Empire in 2000, awarded it a five star out of five rating, deeming Russell's performance a "career-best" and adding: "This labyrinthine psychological drama is almost like a cut-up Columbo episode, savagely tackling the whodunit and continental romance genres."

Critic Peter Bradshaw, writing in a 2018 retrospective on Roeg's career, declared the film a "toweringly transgressive and challenging masterpiece."

Filmink called it "consistently interesting and thought provoking, if a little pervy (like a lot of Roeg movies)." On the review aggregator website Rotten Tomatoes, 46% of 13 critics' reviews are positive, with an average rating of 3.1/10.

=== Accolades ===
Award/association	Year	Category	Recipient(s) and nominee(s)	Result	Ref.
Evening Standard British Film Awards	1980	Best Actor	Denholm Elliott	Won	
Evening Standard British Film Awards	1980	Best Film — Drama	Bad Timing	Nominated	
London Film Critics Circle Award	1980	Best Director	Nicolas Roeg	Won	
Toronto Festival of Festivals	1980	People's Choice Award	Bad Timing	Won	

== Legacy ==
Filmmakers including as Edgar Wright, Christopher Nolan, Danny Boyle, and Steven Soderbergh have cited the film's jarring editing techniques as notable influences on their own work.

The film's title was used by musician Jim O'Rourke for his album Bad Timing, the first in a trilogy of albums which O'Rourke named after films Nicolas Roeg had made during the nineteen-eighties – the other two being Eureka (O'Rourke's 1999 album, title taken from Eureka, Roeg's 1983 film) and Insignificance (O'Rourke's 2001 album, title taken from Insignificance, Roeg's 1985 film). The film Bad Timing was also a partial inspiration for The Glove's 1983 album Blue Sunshine, a side project of The Cure's Robert Smith and Siouxsie and the Banshees' Steven Severin. According to Smith, the song "Piggy in the Mirror" from The Cure's 1984 album The Top was also inspired by the film. The film is also mentioned in the lyrics of "Return", a song from The Cure's 1996 album Wild Mood Swings.

Despite receiving a limited theatrical release in the United States, television rights were acquired by the Los Angeles-based pay cable network Z Channel who aired the film in heavy rotation, allowing it to obtain cult status in the 1980s.

== Sources ==
- Lanza, Joseph (1989). Fragile Geometry: The Films, Philosophy, and Misadventures of Nicolas Roeg. New York City, New York: PAJ Publications. ISBN 978-1-555-54034-0.
- McFarlane, Brian (1997). An Autobiography of British Cinema: As Told By the Filmmakers and Actors Who Made It. London, England: Methuen. ISBN 978-0-413-70520-4.
- Miller, Toby (2003). Spyscreen: Espionage on Film and TV from the 1930s to the 1960s. Oxford, England: Oxford University Press. ISBN 978-0-198-15952-0.
- Sinyard, Neil (1991). The Films of Nicolas Roeg. London, England: Charles Letts. ISBN 978-1-852-38166-0.
- Thoss, Jeff (2017). "Deceptive Continuity: Classical Editing and Nonlinear Narrative in Nicolas Roeg's Bad Timing". In Schlickers, Sabine; Toro, Vera (eds.). Perturbatory Narration in Film: Narratological Studies on Deception, Paradox and Empuzzlement. Berlin, Germany: De Gruyter. pp. 179–198. ISBN 978-3-110-56657-4.
