= Antigone (Eiko Ishibashi album) =

2025 studio album by Eiko Ishibashi

Studio album by Eiko Ishibashi
- Released: 28 March 2025
- Genre: Chamber pop
- Length: 39:42
- Label: Drag City
- Producer: Jim O'Rourke

Eiko Ishibashi chronology
Evil Does Not Exist (2024)	Antigone (2025)

Antigone is a studio album by Japanese musician Eiko Ishibashi. It was released on 28 March 2025 through Drag City. It received universal acclaim from critics.

== Background ==
Eiko Ishibashi is a Japanese musician from Chiba Prefecture. She composed the scores for Ryusuke Hamaguchi's films Drive My Car and Evil Does Not Exist. Antigone is her first proper album since The Dream My Bones Dream (2018). It was released on 28 March 2025 through Drag City. Music videos were released for the tracks "Coma" and "Mona Lisa".

== Critical reception ==
Professional ratings
Aggregate scores
Source	Rating
Metacritic	84/100
Review scores
Source	Rating
Financial Times	4/5 stars
Spectrum Culture	80%
Uncut	4.5/5 stars

According to the review aggregator Metacritic, Antigone received "universal acclaim" based on a weighted average score of 84 out of 100 from 4 critic scores.

Patrick St. Michel of Bandcamp Daily wrote, "Despite the darkness inherent in its sociopolitical context, the beauty of Antigone's music offers a testament to its transcendence." Raphael Helfand of The Fader described the album as "a fully immersive experience, pulling the listener down complex emotional currents so gently one hardly notices they're being taken." Levi Dayan of The Quietus stated, "Listening to Antigone, one can hear everything Ishibashi has achieved in these fruitful past few years coming to a head."

=== Accolades ===
Year-end lists for Antigone
Publication	List	Rank	Ref.
The Quietus	The Quietus Albums of the Year 2025	23	
Spectrum Culture	Top 20 Albums of 2025	10	
Uncut	Top 50 New Albums of 2025	37	
The Wire	Releases of the Year (2025 Rewind)	6	

== Track listing ==
All tracks are written by Eiko Ishibashi, except "Nothing As" by Jim O'Rourke.

Antigone track listing
No.	Title	Length
1.	"October"	4:47
2.	"Coma"	4:19
3.	"Trial"	4:06
4.	"Nothing As"	3:13
5.	"Mona Lisa"	5:42
6.	"Continuous Contiguous"	3:38
7.	"The Model"	8:33
8.	"Antigone"	5:21
Total length:		39:42

Notes

- The orchestral part of "The Model" was composed for 2x25 at Film Fest Gent and performed by Brussels Philharmonic, conducted by Dirk Brossé.
- The spoken text of "The Model" is taken from "The Politics of Health in the Eighteenth Century" by Michel Foucault.

== Personnel ==
Credits adapted from liner notes.

- Eiko Ishibashi – vocals, piano, Rhodes piano, synthesizer, sound collage, string arrangement, horn arrangement, recording
- Jim O'Rourke – synthesizer, six-string bass, drum machine, string arrangement, horn arrangement, production, recording, mixing
- Tatsuhisa Yamamoto – drums
- Joe Talia – percussion (1, 2), drums (3)
- Marty Holoubek – bass (1–3, 5–8)
- Ermhoi – vocals (2), backing vocals (2, 3, 5, 7)
- Kalle Moberg – accordion (2, 6)
- Kei Matsumaru – alto saxophone (3, 5), tenor saxophone (3, 5)
- Toshioaki Sudoh – bass (4)
- Mio.O – violin (8)
- Kirin Uchida – cello (8)
- Taro Mizutani – cover photography, inner sleeve photography
- Yoko Kusano – inner sleeve photography
- Shibashin – 3DCG
- Dan Osborn – layout
