= Evil Does Not Exist (soundtrack) =

Soundtrack album by Eiko Ishibashi
- Released: 28 June 2024
- Length: 43:48
- Label: Drag City

Eiko Ishibashi chronology
For McCoy (2022)	Evil Does Not Exist (2024)	Antigone (2025)

Evil Does Not Exist is the soundtrack album to the 2023 film Evil Does Not Exist, written and directed by Ryusuke Hamaguchi. It is composed by Eiko Ishibashi, and was released on 28 June 2024 through Drag City. It received universal acclaim from critics.

== Background ==
Eiko Ishibashi composed the score for Ryusuke Hamaguchi's 2021 film, Drive My Car. After that, Ishibashi asked Hamaguchi if he would create visuals to accompany her live performance. Hamaguchi originally set out to create a short film, but eventually expanded it into a feature film, Evil Does Not Exist.

The album is mixed and mastered by Jim O'Rourke. It was released on 28 June 2024 through Drag City.

== Critical reception ==
Professional ratings
Aggregate scores
Source	Rating
Metacritic	82/100
Review scores
Source	Rating
Pitchfork	7.5/10
Spectrum Culture	72%
Uncut	4/5 stars

According to the review aggregator Metacritic, Evil Does Not Exist received "universal acclaim" based on a weighted average score of 82 out of 100 from 6 critic scores.

Sam Goldner of Pitchfork commented that "The cloudier nature of Ishibashi's score leaves it feeling less like a standalone piece than the soft, jazzy pop of her Drive My Car soundtrack." He added, "But as a mirror to Hamaguchi's tale of creeping environmental anxiety, Ishibashi's ghostly music makes a rich companion." Tom Pinnock of Uncut wrote, "the mood is darker and eerier than her feted Drive My Car, but it's the stronger album nonetheless." Levi Dayan of The Quietus called the album "both tense and remarkably open, always maintaining a sense of mystery in its melancholy."

=== Accolades ===
Year-end lists for Evil Does Not Exist
Publication	List	Rank	Ref.
The Wire	Releases of the Year (2024 Rewind)	49	

== Track listing ==
All music is composed by Eiko Ishibashi.

Evil Does Not Exist track listing
No.	Title	Length
1.	"Evil Does Not Exist V.2"	5:59
2.	"Hana V.2"	7:33
3.	"Fether"	2:25
4.	"Smoke"	4:30
5.	"Deer Blood"	5:48
6.	"Missing V.2"	12:04
7.	"Evil Does Not Exist"	5:27
Total length:		43:48

== Personnel ==
Credits adapted from liner notes.

- Eiko Ishibashi
- Jim O'Rourke – guitar, mixing, mastering
- Mio.O – violin
- Kirin Uchida – cello
- Tatsuhisa Yamamoto – drums
- Izumi Matsuno – recording

== Charts ==
Chart performance for Evil Does Not Exist
Chart (2024)	Peak position
UK Soundtrack Albums (Official Charts)	34
