= Loose Fur =

American rock supergroup

- Origin: Chicago, Illinois, U.S.
- Genres: Alternative rock, indie rock, post-rock
- Years active: 2000–2006
- Label: Drag City
- Past members: Jeff Tweedy; Jim O'Rourke; Glenn Kotche

Loose Fur was an American rock supergroup comprising Wilco members Jeff Tweedy and Glenn Kotche, along with Wilco collaborator and Sonic Youth multi-instrumentalist Jim O'Rourke. The trio first convened in May 2000 in preparation for a Tweedy performance at a festival in Chicago. Tweedy was offered the opportunity to collaborate with an artist of his choosing, and he decided to work with O'Rourke. O'Rourke brought Kotche to a rehearsal session, and the trio recorded an album's worth of songs. The trio have since released two albums, 2003's Loose Fur and 2006's Born Again in the USA, for Drag City. The band has only toured once.

The band is noted for its influence on Wilco's fourth album, Yankee Hotel Foxtrot. Tweedy was unhappy with how music from the initial recording sessions for the album was sounding, resulting in a lineup change for the band. Both O'Rourke and Kotche replaced members of Wilco during the recording sessions for the album, and both contributed to the band's recordings through 2007's Sky Blue Sky. Kotche remains a member of Wilco as of 2026.

== Formation ==
In the winter of 1999, Wilco lead singer Jeff Tweedy acquired a copy of Jim O'Rourke's 1997 album Bad Timing. The album featured four instrumental tracks that juxtaposed guitar parts with orchestration. Tweedy liked how O'Rourke's music was varied and "not easily categorized". According to Tweedy:

[Bad Timing] ended up blowing my mind more than just about any album I'd heard in the last five years.

Tweedy was invited to perform with a collaborator of his choice for the 2000 Noise Pop Festival in Chicago. The festival promoter offered to pair him with members of the Mekons, but Tweedy decided to collaborate with O'Rourke. The pair met at O'Rourke's apartment a few days before the festival. They listened to gramophone records by T. Rex, Phil Niblock, and Roy Harper; later that night they wrote material for the concert and agreed to meet the next day at the Wilco loft in Chicago. O'Rourke invited Glenn Kotche, a drummer who played in a similar musical style, to the practice session. Tweedy found lyrical inspiration from word exercises; for example, he picked out random words from a copy of TV Guide and formed abstract lines such as "you boil hearts and discuss birds". He also sought to improve as a guitarist, taking influence from free jazz artists such as James "Blood" Ulmer.

On May 14, 2000, Jeff Tweedy played the Noise Pop Festival at Double Door in a concert that polarized Wilco fans. Natalie Merchant joined the band onstage, but left after Tweedy requested that she perform Utah Phillips' murder ballad "Rock Salt and Nails". Among the new material performed at the concert was "Laminated Cat", a reworked version of a Wilco demo entitled "Not for the Season"—Tweedy was unhappy with the straightforwardness of Wilco's version. The trio decided to name their band Loose Fur and recorded a six-song album in the summer of 2000. The band also made an uncredited appearance on O'Rourke's 2001 solo album Insignificance. The Loose Fur album was not released at the time because Tweedy was busy recording Wilco's fourth album, Yankee Hotel Foxtrot.

== Influence on Yankee Hotel Foxtrot ==
By winter 2000, Wilco had completed enough material for an album release. However, Tweedy was dissatisfied with the "emotional center" of the recordings. He wanted the release to sound more like the music he had recorded with Loose Fur, although he "couldn't put his finger on why." Tweedy wanted the album to advance the sound of Wilco in a similar fashion as Being There and Summerteeth. He became irritated by Wilco drummer Ken Coomer because Coomer disliked playing consistent drum patterns each time that the band played a song. Wilco guitarist Jay Bennett also soured on Coomer because of the drummer's lack of patience and consistency. Although he briefly considered adding Kotche as a secondary percussionist, Tweedy decided to replace Coomer with his Loose Fur bandmate:

Playing solo shows, playing with Glenn, playing in Loose Fur made me realize how important it was to have Wilco feel like those experiences. I played this whole show in December with a drummer who theoretically didn't know any of the material, and it felt more fluid and exciting than 90 percent of the shows I'd done in the last three or four years. That was too much information to ignore. I became certain that this is how music is supposed to feel, and I got braver about doing something about it.

Kotche re-wrote the drum parts for the album almost immediately upon his acceptance into the band. In one instance, he reworked "I Am Trying to Break Your Heart" by adding parts played on hubcaps, crotales, and floor tiles. Although some members were unsure about the decision to replace Coomer with Kotche, the band unanimously supported the decision after hearing Kotche's new percussion parts. According to Bennett:

Glenn made the songs happen. He could do what was asked of him and brought good ideas to the table. He's an extramusical drummer—not more or less talented than Ken, but certainly different in the kinds of things he was able to bring to the songs. After that, no one could curse Jeff for sponsoring this great musician into the band. It was the right decision.

Coomer wasn't the only band member that struck a nerve with Tweedy during the recording sessions. Tweedy was unhappy with the way that Bennett mixed parts of the album, particularly the sequences between songs. Tweedy felt that Bennett was "burning out" while mixing the album, and invited Jim O'Rourke to remix "I Am Trying to Break Your Heart". Although Bennett conceded that O'Rourke did a better job of mixing the song, animosity arose between the two engineers. O'Rourke continued to remix more songs, and attempted to increase the drama of the album by reducing the contributions by the backing members of Wilco. He removed so many parts on some songs that only music by Tweedy, Kotche, and himself—the three members of Loose Fur—appeared on those pieces.

== Recording career ==
On January 28, 2003, Loose Fur released the six-track album that they recorded at the Wilco loft in 2000. Unlike Yankee Hotel Foxtrot, Loose Fur featured only one overdub per song. The band played two shows in Brooklyn, NY in support of the album, playing their first live show as "Loose Fur" on December 6, 2002.

In October 2005, Tweedy announced that the band was nearly finished recording their second Loose Fur album. The album, Born Again in the USA, was the first album to consist mostly of O'Rourke lyrics since Insignificance. Unlike their first album, Loose Fur did not tour to support the album. In contrast to their eponymous debut, Born Again in the USA was heavier with more harmonized guitar parts. Both of their albums were received favorably by critics. Tweedy performed "The Ruling Class" and "Laminated Cat" on a solo performance DVD in 2005. Glenn Kotche is still the drummer for Wilco, and Jim O'Rourke is a regular collaborator with the band; both performed on A Ghost Is Born and Sky Blue Sky. In a 2016 interview, Jeff Tweedy confirmed that the band has already recorded a followup to Born Again In The USA, but that the recordings had not yet undergone post-production.

== Discography ==
Date	Title	Formats
January 28, 2003	Loose Fur	CD, vinyl
March 21, 2006	Born Again in the USA	CD, vinyl
