= What's Your 20? Essential Tracks 1994–2014 =

What's What's Your 20? Essential Tracks 1994–2014

Compilation album by Wilco
- Released: November 17, 2014
- Genre: Alternative rock; indie rock; alternative country; folk rock
- Length: 156:23
- Label: Nonesuch
- Producer: Cheryl Pawelski; Jeff Tweedy; Tony Margherita; Deb Bernardini

Wilco chronology
The Whole Love (2011)	What's What's Your 20? Essential Tracks 1994–2014 (2014)	Alpha Mike Foxtrot: Rare Tracks 1994–2014 (2014)

What's Your 20? Essential Tracks 1994–2014 is a compilation album by the American alternative rock band Wilco, released on November 17, 2014, through Nonesuch Records. Issued to commemorate the band's 20th anniversary, the album spans Wilco's career from their 1995 debut album A.M. through 2011's The Whole Love, collecting 38 tracks across two discs. The compilation was released alongside Alpha Mike Foxtrot: Rare Tracks 1994–2014, a four-disc collection of rare studio and live recordings.

== Critical reception ==
Critical reception to the album was generally positive. At review aggregator Metacritic, What's Your 20? Essential Tracks 1994–2014 received a score of 84 out of 100, based on seven critic reviews, indicating "universal acclaim". Reviewing the compilation alongside Alpha Mike Foxtrot, Pitchfork described What's Your 20? as "a reasonable place to start" for listeners unfamiliar with the band and praised its ability to illustrate Wilco's stylistic evolution over two decades.

== Track listing ==
All tracks are written by Jeff Tweedy except where noted; all lyrics by Tweedy except for "Misunderstood", by Tweedy and Peter Laughner, and "Airline to Heaven" by Woody Guthrie.

Disc one
No.	Title	Writer(s)	Original release	Length
1.	"I Must Be High"		A.M.	2:59
2.	"Box Full of Letters"		A.M.	3:04
3.	"Passenger Side"		A.M.	3:33
4.	"Casino Queen"		A.M.	2:44
5.	"Misunderstood"		Being There	6:29
6.	"Red-Eyed and Blue"		Being There	2:45
7.	"I Got You (At the End of the Century)"		Being There	3:57
8.	"Monday"		Being There	3:32
9.	"Outtasite (Outta Mind)"		Being There	2:35
10.	"Sunken Treasure"		Being There	6:52
11.	"California Stars"	Jay Bennett, Jeff Tweedy	Mermaid Avenue	4:57
12.	"Hesitating Beauty"		Mermaid Avenue	3:04
13.	"A Shot In the Arm"	Jay Bennett, John Stirratt, Jeff Tweedy	Summerteeth	4:18
14.	"Can't Stand It"	Jay Bennett, Jeff Tweedy	Summerteeth	3:45
15.	"She's a Jar"	Jay Bennett, Jeff Tweedy	Summerteeth	4:42
16.	"I'm Always in Love"	Jay Bennett, Jeff Tweedy	Summerteeth	3:39
17.	"How to Fight Loneliness"	Jay Bennett, Jeff Tweedy	Summerteeth	3:51
18.	"Via Chicago"		Summerteeth	5:32
19.	"Airline to Heaven"	Jay Bennett, Jeff Tweedy	Mermaid Avenue Vol. II	4:49
Total length:				77:10

Disc two
No.	Title	Writer(s)	Original release	Length
20.	"I Am Trying to Break Your Heart"		Yankee Hotel Foxtrot	6:57
21.	"I'm the Man Who Loves You"	Jay Bennett, Jeff Tweedy	Yankee Hotel Foxtrot	3:55
22.	"War on War"	Jay Bennett, Jeff Tweedy	Yankee Hotel Foxtrot	3:47
23.	"Jesus, Etc."	Jay Bennett, Jeff Tweedy	Yankee Hotel Foxtrot	3:50
24.	"Ashes of American Flags"	Jay Bennett, Jeff Tweedy	Yankee Hotel Foxtrot	4:44
25.	"Heavy Metal Drummer"		Yankee Hotel Foxtrot	3:08
26.	"Hummingbird"		A Ghost Is Born	3:11
27.	"Theologians"	Mikael Jorgensen, Glenn Kotche, Jeff Tweedy	A Ghost Is Born	3:36
28.	"Handshake Drugs"		A Ghost Is Born	6:07
29.	"The Late Greats"		A Ghost Is Born	2:31
30.	"Hate It Here"	Wilco	Sky Blue Sky	4:31
31.	"Impossible Germany"	Wilco	Sky Blue Sky	5:57
32.	"Walken"	Wilco	Sky Blue Sky	4:26
33.	"Wilco (The Song)"		Wilco (The Album)	2:59
34.	"You and I"		Wilco (The Album)	3:26
35.	"You Never Know"		Wilco (The Album)	4:21
36.	"I Might"		The Whole Love	4:02
37.	"Born Alone"		The Whole Love	3:55
38.	"Whole Love"		The Whole Love	3:50
Total length:				79:13
