= Shutting Down Here =

Studio album by Jim O'Rourke
- Released: August 14, 2020
- Studio: INA GRM; Steamroom
- Genre: Experimental; ambient
- Length: 34:18
- Label: Portraits GRM

Jim O'Rourke chronology
To Magnetize Money and Catch a Roving Eye (2019)	Shutting Down Here (2020)	Too Compliment (2021)

Shutting Down Here is a studio album by American musician Jim O'Rourke. It was released on August 14, 2020, through Portraits GRM. It received generally favorable reviews from critics.

== Background ==
Shutting Down Here is Portraits GRM's first release. The album consists of a single 34-minute track. It combines recordings Jim O'Rourke made at the GRM studio in France thirty years apart, as well as sessions at his own Steamroom studio in Japan. It features contributions from Eiko Ishibashi (on piano), Atsuko Hatano (on violin and viola), and Eivind Lønning (on trumpet).

According to Bandcamp Daily in 2023, Jim O'Rourke "considers Shutting Down Here the most meaningful album to him in all of his discography."

== Critical reception ==
Professional ratings
Aggregate scores
Source	Rating
Metacritic	76/100
Review scores
Source	Rating
AllMusic	4/5 stars
Exclaim!	7/10
Pitchfork	8.0/10
PopMatters	5/10 stars

According to the review aggregator Metacritic, Shutting Down Here received "generally favorable reviews" based on a weighted average score of 76 out of 100 from 5 critic scores.

Heather Phares of AllMusic stated, "From its eerie beginning to its twilit end, Shutting Down Here's rotating and lapping elements are remarkably conversant with each other, at times evoking works like 1995's Terminal Pharmacy and at others nodding to his prolific output in the 2010s and 2020s in mysterious and poignant ways." John Amen of Exclaim! commented that "Some listeners may regard Shutting Down Here as lacking in sublimity or sonic theatrics, the type of riveting evocations one encounters contemporarily with the music of Nicolás Jaar or the Soft Pink Truth." He added, "Shutting Down Here is indeed more subtly rendered, and O'Rourke is more interested in sustaining a low-grade tension than facilitating seismic conflicts and resolutions." Daniel Felsenthal of Pitchfork commented that "Shutting Down Here melds noise and melodic ideas so seamlessly that the piece works as both tape music and as contemporary orchestration, reminiscent of John Adams' similarly audiophiliac The Dharma at Big Sur."

== Track listing ==
Shutting Down Here track listing
No.	Title	Length
1.	"Shutting Down Here"	34:18

== Personnel ==
Credits adapted from liner notes.

- Jim O'Rourke
- Eiko Ishibashi – piano, photography
- Atsuko Hatano – violin, viola
- Eivind Lønning – trumpet
- Andreas Kauffelt – mastering
- Stephen O'Malley – sleeve design
- François Bonnet – coordination
- Jules Négrier – coordination
- Peter Rehberg – executive production
