= Simple Songs (Jim O'Rourke album) =

Studio album by Jim O'Rourke
- Released: May 19, 2015
- Recorded: 2009–2015
- Studio: Hoshi To Niji, Steamroom (Yamanashi Prefecture, Japan)
- Genre: Indie rock; pop rock; art rock
- Length: 37:38
- Label: Drag City
- Producer: Jim O'Rourke

Jim O'Rourke chronology
The Visitor (2009)	Simple Songs (2015)	Hands That Bind (2023)

Simple Songs is the third singer-songwriter album by American musician Jim O'Rourke. It was released on May 19, 2015, on Drag City. The album was released nearly fourteen years after O'Rourke's previous singer-songwriter album Insignificance (2001).

== Critical reception ==
Professional ratings
Aggregate scores
Source	Rating
AnyDecentMusic?	8.0/10
Metacritic	86/100
Review scores
Source	Rating
American Songwriter	3.5/5 stars
Consequence of Sound	B
Exclaim!	8/10
Financial Times	4/5 stars
The Line of Best Fit	9/10
Mojo	4/5 stars
Pitchfork	8.6/10
Record Collector	4/5 stars
Uncut	8/10

At Metacritic, which assigns a normalized rating out of 100 to reviews from mainstream critics, the album received an average score of 86 based on 14 professional reviews, which indicates "universal acclaim".

=== Accolades ===
Publication	Accolade	Year	Rank
Pitchfork	The 50 Best Albums of 2015	2015	45
Stereogum	The 50 Best Albums of 2015	2015	9
The Wire	Releases of the Year 1–50	2015	7

== Track listing ==
All tracks are written by Jim O'Rourke.

No.	Title	Length
1.	"Friends with Benefits"	5:25
2.	"That Weekend"	3:15
3.	"Half Life Crisis"	4:42
4.	"Hotel Blue"	3:21
5.	"These Hands"	3:13
6.	"Last Year"	5:47
7.	"End of the Road"	5:33
8.	"All Your Love"	6:22
Total length:		37:38

== Personnel ==
The following people contributed to Simple Songs:

Main personnel

- Jim O'Rourke – vocals, guitar
- Sudoh Toshiaki – bass
- Tatsuhisa Yamamoto – drums
- Akiko Yoshino – French horn (4, 6, 7, 8)
- Ren Takada – pedal steel guitar (5)
- Eiko Ishibashi – piano, organ
- Jun Moriyama – saxophone (3)
- Nahoko Kamei – saxophone (3, 7)
- Atsuko Hatano – strings
- Daysuke Takaoka – tuba (2, 3, 6, 8)

Additional personnel

- John Golden – mastering
- Kuniyoshi Taikou – photography
