= Kouen Kyoudai =

Studio album by Masami Akita and Eiko Ishibashi
- Released: 18 March 2016
- Studio: Gok Sound (Tokyo); Super Deluxe (Tokyo)
- Genre: Avant-garde
- Length: 37:12
- Label: Editions Mego

Kouen Kyoudai (公園兄弟) is a collaborative studio album by Japanese musicians Masami Akita (also known as Merzbow) and Eiko Ishibashi. It was released on 18 March 2016 through Editions Mego.

== Background ==
Masami Akita, also known as Merzbow, is a Japanese musician from Tokyo. Eiko Ishibashi is a Japanese musician from Chiba Prefecture. Kouen Kyoudai is their collaborative album. It consists of two tracks: "Slide" and "Junglegym". The recording took place at Tokyo studios Gok Sound and Super Deluxe. The album was recorded and mixed by Jim O'Rourke. It was released on 18 March 2016 through Editions Mego.

== Critical reception ==
Professional ratings
Review scores
Source	Rating
AllMusic	4/5 stars
Pitchfork	5.1/10
Spectrum Culture	3/5

Thom Jurek of AllMusic stated, "While it appears freely improvised, it's actually quite carefully constructed." He added, "For fans of imaginative noise and communicative improvisation, Kouen Kyoudai is a gem." Meanwhile, Kevin Lozano of Pitchfork wrote, "As the album wears on unchanged through almost 40 minutes, it sounds more like an amorphous chunk of noises than an exploration of contemporary avant-garde."

=== Accolades ===
Year-end lists for Kouen Kyoudai
Publication	List	Rank	Ref.
Rolling Stone	20 Best Avant Albums of 2016	19	

== Track listing ==
Kouen Kyoudai track listing
No.	Title	Length
1.	"Slide"	18:35
2.	"Junglegym"	18:37
Total length:		37:12

== Personnel ==
Credits adapted from liner notes.

- Masami Akita – noise electronics, computer, drums
- Eiko Ishibashi – piano, drums, synthesizer
- Jim O'Rourke – recording, mixing
- Shunichiro Okada – photography
- Jacos Cates – design
