= Yankee Hotel Foxtrot =

2001 studio album by Wilco

Studio album by Wilco
- Released: September 19, 2001 (Note: Yankee Hotel Foxtrot was originally self-released as streamed audio on September 19, 2001, and received an official retail release through Nonesuch Records on April 23, 2002.)
- Recorded: Late 2000 – July 6, 2001
- Studios: The Loft, Chicago (Note: Additional recording at CRC and Soma E.M.S. in Chicago)
- Genres: Art rock; indie rock
- Length: 51:51
- Labels: Self-released (original); Nonesuch (retail)
- Producer: Wilco

Wilco chronology
| Mermaid Avenue Vol. II (2000) | Yankee Hotel Foxtrot (2001) | A Ghost Is Born (2004) |

Singles from Yankee Hotel Foxtrot
- 1. "Heavy Metal Drummer" Released: April 23, 2002; 2. "War on War" Released: May 21, 2002

Yankee Hotel Foxtrot is the fourth studio album by the American rock band Wilco, originally self-released on September 19, 2001, on Wilco's website as streamed audio, and later as a retail release on April 23, 2002, through Nonesuch Records. Recording sessions for the album began in late 2000. These sessions, which were documented for the film I Am Trying to Break Your Heart, were marred by conflicts including a switch in drummers and disagreements among the band members and engineers about songs. Despite this, the album was mostly completed by early 2001. The album showcased a more atmospheric and experimental sound than the band's previous work, and has been described as art rock and indie rock by music critics. It was the band's first album with drummer Glenn Kotche, and last with multi-instrumentalist and songwriter Jay Bennett.

Reprise Records, Wilco's record label at the time, refused to release the album as they felt unhappy about the result; this would lead to Wilco's departure from Reprise. The band subsequently acquired the rights to the album and later streamed the entire album for free on their website on September 19, 2001, 11 days after the planned release date. In November of that year, Wilco signed with Nonesuch Records, who gave the album its first official retail release on April 23, 2002. Yankee Hotel Foxtrot received widespread acclaim from music critics at release, and is widely regarded as one of the greatest albums of the 2000s and of all time. It is also Wilco's best-selling work, having reached number 13 on the Billboard 200 chart. In 2020, Rolling Stone ranked the album at number 225 on its updated "500 Greatest Albums of All Time" list.

== Background and recording ==
"I Am Trying to Break Your Heart"
The first track from the album, this song features an intro on crotales composed by Glenn Kotche.

Wilco was touring to promote Mermaid Avenue Vol. II in May 2000 when lead singer Jeff Tweedy was invited to play at the Noise Pop Festival in Chicago. The festival promoter offered to pair Tweedy with a collaborator of his choosing, and Tweedy decided to perform with Jim O'Rourke. Tweedy frequently played O'Rourke's album Bad Timing in his car while he traveled during the previous winter. O'Rourke was an accomplished producer as well as a musician, and had produced over 200 albums by the time that Tweedy requested the collaboration. O'Rourke offered the services of drummer Glenn Kotche, and the trio performed at Double Door for the festival on May 14, 2000. Tweedy enjoyed the performance so much that he suggested that the trio record an album together. They chose the name Loose Fur, and recorded six songs during the following summer.

By the end of the year, Wilco had recorded enough demo tracks to release a fourth studio album. Its working title was Here Comes Everybody, which was later scrapped in favour of Yankee Hotel Foxtrot. Australian band Spacey Jane later released an album titled Here Comes Everybody in 2022 in tribute to the working title, for which they sought approval from Wilco prior to release. Despite having enough songs for an album, the band was unhappy with some of the demo takes. This was attributed to the inflexibility of Ken Coomer's drumming. According to American Songwriter, "virtually every attempt [Tweedy] made to steer Coomer toward the percussive sound he had envisioned for the record sparked a fight." The band decided to bring Kotche into the studio to record with the band. Wilco officially replaced Coomer with Kotche in January 2001, a decision originally proposed by Tweedy and almost immediately approved by the rest of the band.

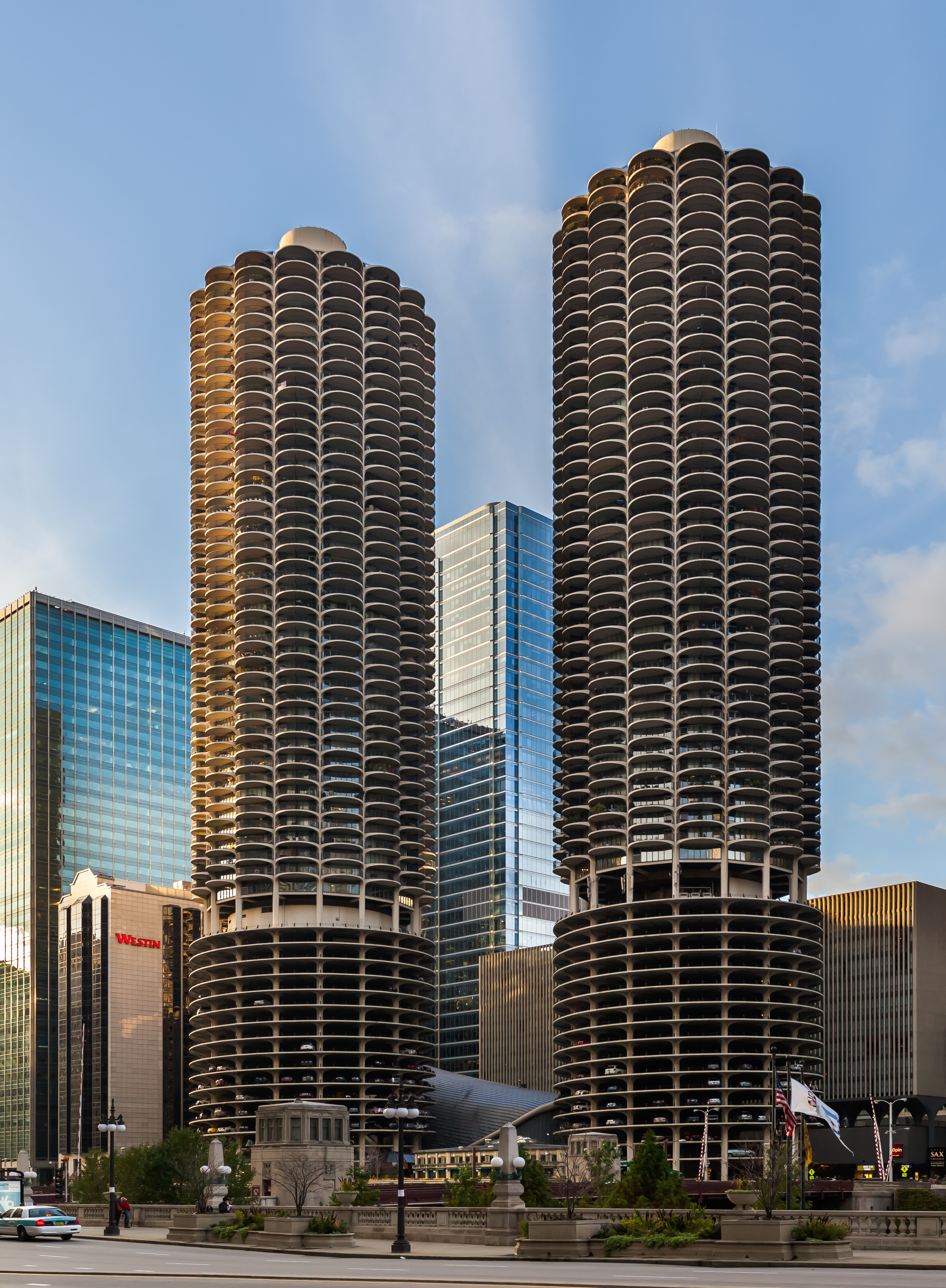
The Marina City complex on the Chicago River. The album cover features a photograph of the two towers.

Guitarist Jay Bennett and Chris Brickley served as the audio engineers, and agreed with Tweedy that O'Rourke would be a good choice to mix the album, after a failed attempt to mix a few of the songs at the Chicago Recording Company and after hearing O'Rourke's "audition mix". One of the conflicts, exhibited in the film I Am Trying to Break Your Heart: A Film About Wilco, was over the ten-second transition between "Ashes of American Flags" and "Heavy Metal Drummer". Bennett attempted to explain to Tweedy that there were several slightly different ways to approach the transition, each of which would yield slightly different results, but Tweedy explained that he just wanted the problem fixed, and was not concerned with understanding the different approaches. Bennett focused on the individual songs, while Tweedy focused on larger conceptual and thematic issues—a tried and true division of labor that had worked well on the four releases on which they co-wrote the material.

In order to achieve the band's musical goals, Tweedy invited Jim O'Rourke into the studio to mix "I Am Trying to Break Your Heart", and the results impressed the band members. He recorded 6 of the 12 tracks on the album. O'Rourke was then asked to mix the rest of the album. After the album's completion, Tweedy decided to remove Bennett from the band. The album was completed in 2001, and Tweedy believed it to be ready for release. The album was given the title Yankee Hotel Foxtrot, referencing a series of letters in the phonetic alphabet that Tweedy had heard on the Irdial box set The Conet Project: Recordings of Shortwave Numbers Stations. A clip from this Numbers Station transmission was placed in the Yankee Hotel Foxtrot song "Poor Places"; Irdial later sued Wilco for copyright infringement, and a settlement was reached out of court. The cover of the album is a picture of the two Marina City complex towers in the band's adopted hometown of Chicago.

Los Angeles photographer Sam Jones contacted Wilco in 2000 about producing a documentary film about the creation of Yankee Hotel Foxtrot. Jones shot over 80 hours of footage for I Am Trying to Break Your Heart: A Film About Wilco beginning on the day that Coomer was dismissed from the band. The footage was edited down to 92 minutes, and the film was released to theaters in 2002. The documentary has received generally positive reviews.

== Release ==
=== Original release ===
In 2001, AOL merged with Time Warner to form AOL Time Warner. Time Warner's market share of the music industry had dropped almost five percent from the mid-1990s, and the new executives ordered the termination of 600 jobs. One of those jobs was Reprise Records president Howie Klein, who had been a big supporter of Wilco on the label. Klein's dismissal placed head A&R representative David Kahne in charge of the decision whether to release Yankee Hotel Foxtrot. Kahne assigned A&R representative Mio Vukovic to monitor the progress of the album. Vukovic was unhappy about the album because he felt that his suggestions were not being considered. Kahne wanted a radio single from the album, but he felt that none of the songs were suitable for commercial release. In June 2001, the album was officially rejected and Vukovic suggested that the band independently release the album.

Josh Grier, Wilco's lawyer, was able to negotiate a buy-out of the band from Reprise. The band would keep the rights to the album if they paid Reprise $50,000. Before Wilco could accept the deal, Reprise called the band and changed their offer to give the band the rights to Yankee Hotel Foxtrot for free. Despite Reprise's efforts to accommodate Wilco's departure, the process marred public relations after an article in the Chicago Tribune described what had happened.

Wilco had planned on releasing Yankee Hotel Foxtrot on September 11, 2001, but Tweedy did not want a change in record labels to significantly delay the release of the album. Within weeks of being released from the label and Jay Bennett leaving the band, MP3s of all tracks from the album began to appear on file sharing networks. In a decision aimed at discouraging the downloading of lower quality unlicensed MP3s and having some control over how the album was distributed, on September 19, 2001, Wilco began streaming the entirety of the album on their official website. The wilcoworld.net website registered over 50,000 hits that day, eight times as much as typical daily traffic. Traffic to the website quadrupled the normal traffic over the next few months. The following tour was a success financially, and members of Wilco observed that fans sang along with songs from the unreleased album.

=== Retail release ===
Both major and independent record labels made bids to release Yankee Hotel Foxtrot, including Artemis Records and Nonesuch Records. Tweedy denied the bids of record labels that did not have a roster of signed artists that he liked. He also decided to ignore small, independent labels because he wanted to be able to put the album out for a large audience and felt that very small labels would be unable to produce more than 100,000 copies. Wilco decided to sign with Warner Music subsidiary Nonesuch Records in November 2001, basing the decision on the label's affiliation with a large company, but also Nonesuch's artist-friendly atmosphere. In the end, Wilco recorded and produced Yankee Hotel Foxtrot with Reprise Records (a Warner label), received the rights to the album from Reprise for free, and then had it released by a different Warner label, Nonesuch Records.

The More Like the Moon EP (also called Bridge and Australian EP) was originally released as a bonus disc to the Australian version of Yankee Hotel Foxtrot. The EP comprised six songs that were recorded but not released during the Yankee Hotel Foxtrot sessions including a re-working of "Kamera". On the one-year anniversary of the release of Yankee Hotel Foxtrot, Wilco uploaded the EP onto their official website, and offered it for free to anyone who purchased the album. The band would later allow anyone to download the EP for free off the website, regardless of whether they had purchased the full-length album.

=== 20th anniversary reissue ===
In celebration of the 20th anniversary of the album's release, Wilco performed the album in its entirety for four nights at the United Palace in New York City and three nights at the Auditorium Theater in Chicago. The band was joined by strings and horns sections in an attempt to perform the album as it was recorded. The band also announced reissues of the album, including a Super Deluxe version spanning 11 LPs which includes the original remastered album, demos, rare live recordings, and other alternate versions of the songs. These reissues were released on September 30, 2022. Pitchfork gave the reissue a perfect 10 rating, and naming it "Best New Reissue".

== Reception ==
=== Critical ===
Professional ratings
Aggregate scores
| Source | Rating |
|---|---|
| Metacritic | 87/100 |
Review scores
| Source | Rating |
| AllMusic | 5/5 stars |
| Blender | 4/5 stars |
| Entertainment Weekly | A− |
| The Guardian | 4/5 stars |
| NME | 8/10 |
| Pitchfork | 10/10 |
| Q | 4/5 stars |
| Rolling Stone | 4/5 stars |
| The Rolling Stone Album Guide | 5/5 stars |
| Uncut | 4/5 stars |

Yankee Hotel Foxtrot was acclaimed by critics upon release. Brent Sirota of Pitchfork gave the album a perfect 10 rating, noting that the album was "simply a masterpiece." David Fricke of Rolling Stone praised its resemblance to psychedelia while AllMusic writer Zac Johnson lauded its musical "complexity". E! Online said that its "rich, exotic flavor gets more intense the longer you chew on it", while Stylus Magazine called it "a great album, and an outstanding place for prospective new Wilco fans to start." Billboard gave it a favorable review and called it "a more adventurous and rewarding release". The Austin Chronicle gave it four stars out of five and said that "After a while -- a familiarity period if you will -- it becomes clear that these songs are not only fully realized, they're damn near brilliant." Playlouder gave it four stars out of five and called it "The most worth-the-wait long-awaited album in the world ... ever? Could be ..." Uncut also gave the album four stars out of five and said, "The most common description of this much-discussed album over the past few months is that YHF is Americana's Kid A. In truth, it's more successful than that." Blender likewise gave it four stars out of five and stated: "Tweedy whittles down the arrangements and drops in enough experimental nuances to make the whole thing sound refreshingly lo-fi." Q likewise gave it four stars and called it "battered, bonkers and bewitching in equal parts" and that it "at last finds Wilco's 'interesting' phase become downright fascinating." Yahoo! Music UK gave it eight stars out of ten and said, "Tweedy takes conventional songforms birthed on his acoustic guitar and scrambles them completely, reassembled into fractured, dissonant epics with the help of the reliably brilliant Jim O'Rourke."

Trouser Press was one of the few major media outlets that did not give the album a good review, instead giving it an average review and stating that "more time spent in the songwriting lab might have yielded material more suitable to the evident studio effort invested and brought Wilco closer to making a truly great album." Robert Christgau gave the album a one-star honorable mention rating, describing the music as "purty" but stating that he found the lyrics and vocals in general to be boring.

Though Yankee Hotel Foxtrot was recorded before the September 11, 2001 attacks, critics noted a relevance in light of the attacks. For example, Jeff Gordinier of Entertainment Weekly compared the two towers of Marina City to the World Trade Center towers. Also containing similar themes are the songs "War on War" and "Ashes of American Flags" which contains the line "I would like to salute the ashes of American flags." The song "Jesus, Etc." also contains these lyrics: "Tall buildings shake, Voices escape singing sad sad songs ... Voices whine, Skyscrapers are scraping together, your voice is smoking."

=== Commercial ===
Yankee Hotel Foxtrot was released by Nonesuch on April 23, 2002. The album sold 55,573 copies during its first week of release, peaking on the US Billboard 200 album chart at number 13. The album was certified Gold by the Recording Industry Association of America and has sold over 590,000 units.

=== Accolades ===
Yankee Hotel Foxtrot was voted as the best album of the year in The Village Voice Pazz & Jop critics poll. In 2008, Rolling Stone critic Tom Moon listed Yankee Hotel Foxtrot among the 1,000 Recordings to Hear Before You Die. The album was also included in the book 1001 Albums You Must Hear Before You Die.

Yankee Hotel Foxtrot found a place on many lists of the greatest albums of the 2000s. Rolling Stone ranked the album at number three on its list of the 100 Best Albums of the Decade. Pitchfork put the album at number four on the Top 200 Albums of the 2000s. The alternative music website also named "Poor Places" and "Jesus, Etc." as the 147th and 61st best songs of the decade, respectively. Paste named the album the second-best album of the decade. Some music outlets have ranked Yankee Hotel Foxtrot as one of the greatest albums of all time. In 2006, readers of Q Magazine voted it the 100th "Greatest Album Ever". In 2012, Rolling Stone ranked it #493 on its list of The 500 Greatest Albums of All Time, saying, "Wilco's great leap forward was a mix of rock tradition, electronics, oddball rhythms and experimental gestures.", and in the 2020 reboot of the list, they elevated the album's position to #225.

== Track listing ==
All lyrics are written by Jeff Tweedy; all music is composed by Tweedy with Jay Bennett, except tracks 1, 7 and 11 by Tweedy.

| No. | Title | Length |
|---|---|---|
| 1. | "I Am Trying to Break Your Heart" | 6:57 |
| 2. | "Kamera" | 3:29 |
| 3. | "Radio Cure" | 5:08 |
| 4. | "War on War" | 3:47 |
| 5. | "Jesus, Etc." | 3:50 |
| 6. | "Ashes of American Flags" | 4:43 |
| 7. | "Heavy Metal Drummer" | 3:08 |
| 8. | "I'm the Man Who Loves You" | 3:55 |
| 9. | "Pot Kettle Black" | 4:00 |
| 10. | "Poor Places" | 5:15 |
| 11. | "Reservations" | 7:22 |
| Total length: | | 51:51 |

Super Deluxe Edition - Disc 2
| No. | Title | Length |
|---|---|---|
| 1. | "Anniversary (Nothing Up My Sleeve) (American Aquarium Version)" | 2:46 |
| 2. | "Venus Stopped the Train (American Aquarium Version)" | 4:11 |
| 3. | "Poor Places (American Aquarium Version)" | 3:24 |
| 4. | "I Am Trying to Break Your Heart (American Aquarium Version)" | 5:39 |
| 5. | "American Aquarium" | 6:05 |
| 6. | "Cars Can’t Escape (American Aquarium Version)" | 2:32 |
| 7. | "Kamera (American Aquarium Version)" | 2:54 |
| 8. | "War on War (American Aquarium Version)" | 2:46 |
| 9. | "I’m the Man Who Loves You (American Aquarium Version)" | 4:00 |
| 10. | "Ashes of American Flags (American Aquarium Version)" | 4:00 |
| 11. | "Not for the Season (Laminated Cat) (American Aquarium Version)" | 5:57 |
| 12. | "Shakin’ Sugar (American Aquarium Version)" | 3:31 |
| 13. | "Let Me Come Home (American Aquarium Version)" | 2:40 |
| 14. | "Poor Places (American Aquarium Version)" | 3:27 |
| 15. | "Reservations (American Aquarium Version)" | 3:28 |

Super Deluxe Edition - Disc 3
| No. | Title | Length |
|---|---|---|
| 1. | "Not for the Season (Laminated Cat) (Here Comes Everybody Version)" | 3:13 |
| 2. | "Remember to Remember (Hummingbird) (Here Comes Everybody Version)" | 4:18 |
| 3. | "I Am Trying to Break Your Heart (Here Comes Everybody Version)" | 6:14 |
| 4. | "Kamera (Here Comes Everybody Version)" | 3:14 |
| 5. | "Radio Cure (Here Comes Everybody Version)" | 4:41 |
| 6. | "War on War (Here Comes Everybody Version)" | 3:36 |
| 7. | "Venus Stopped the Train (Here Comes Everybody Version)" | 4:30 |
| 8. | "I’m the Man Who Loves You (Here Comes Everybody Version)" | 3:34 |
| 9. | "The Good Part (Here Comes Everybody Version)" | 3:10 |
| 10. | "Pot Kettle Black (Here Comes Everybody Version)" | 4:36 |
| 11. | "Ashes of American Flags (Here Comes Everybody Version)" | 5:36 |
| 12. | "Poor Places (Here Comes Everybody Version)" | 3:50 |
| 13. | "Shakin’ Sugar (Here Comes Everybody Version)" | 3:11 |
| 14. | "Reservations (Here Comes Everybody Version)" | 3:21 |
| 15. | "Cars Can’t Escape (Here Comes Everybody Version)" | 3:57 |

Super Deluxe Edition - Disc 4
| No. | Title | Length |
|---|---|---|
| 1. | "A Magazine Called Sunset (The Unified Theory of Everything Version)" | 2:52 |
| 2. | "Remember to Remember (Hummingbird) (The Unified Theory of Everything Version)" | 4:48 |
| 3. | "I Am Trying to Break Your Heart (The Unified Theory of Everything Version)" | 7:03 |
| 4. | "Kamera (The Unified Theory of Everything Version)" | 3:21 |
| 5. | "Radio Cure (The Unified Theory of Everything Version)" | 5:39 |
| 6. | "War on War (The Unified Theory of Everything Version)" | 3:59 |
| 7. | "Jesus, Etc. (The Unified Theory of Everything Version)" | 3:52 |
| 8. | "Ashes of American Flags (Stravinsky Mix)" | 5:26 |
| 9. | "Heavy Metal Drummer (The Unified Theory of Everything Version)" | 3:31 |
| 10. | "I’m the Man Who Loves You (The Unified Theory of Everything Version)" | 3:40 |
| 11. | "Pot Kettle Black (The Unified Theory of Everything Version)" | 4:20 |
| 12. | "Poor Places (The Unified Theory of Everything Version)" | 3:46 |
| 13. | "Reservations (The Unified Theory of Everything Version)" | 3:46 |

Super Deluxe Edition - Disc 5
| No. | Title | Length |
|---|---|---|
| 1. | "Love Will (Let You Down) (Lonely in the Deep End Version)" | 5:17 |
| 2. | "Lost Poem Demo (Lonely in the Deep End Version)" | 3:05 |
| 3. | "I’m the Only One Who Lets Her Down (Lonely in the Deep End Version)" | 4:03 |
| 4. | "Has Anybody Seen My Pencil? (Lonely in the Deep End Version)" | 4:14 |
| 5. | "The Good Part (Lonely in the Deep End Version)" | 5:06 |
| 6. | "A Magazine Called Sunset (Lonely in the Deep End Version)" | 2:41 |
| 7. | "A Magazine Called Sunset (Backing Track) (Lonely in the Deep End Version)" | 2:36 |
| 8. | "Anniversary (Nothing Up My Sleeve) (Backing Track) (Lonely in the Deep End Version)" | 2:45 |
| 9. | "Kamera (Lonely in the Deep End Version)" | 2:44 |
| 10. | "I’m the Man Who Loves You (Lonely in the Deep End Version)" | 4:16 |
| 11. | "I Am Trying to Break Your Heart (Lonely in the Deep End Version)" | 4:53 |
| 12. | "Jesus, Etc. (Lonely in the Deep End Version)" | 3:17 |
| 13. | "Reservations (Backing Track) (Lonely in the Deep End Version)" | 3:43 |
| 14. | "Let Me Come Home (Synth) (Lonely in the Deep End Version)" | 1:32 |
| 15. | "Ooby Dooby (Lonely in the Deep End Version)" | 2:10 |

Super Deluxe Edition - Disc 6
| No. | Title | Length |
|---|---|---|
| 1. | "Interview pt. 1" | 3:24 |
| 2. | "War on War (Live in the Studio)" | 3:16 |
| 3. | "Interview pt. 2" | 5:33 |
| 4. | "Interview pt. 3" | 13:57 |
| 5. | "I’m the Man Who Loves You (Live in the Studio)" | 3:53 |
| 6. | "Interview pt. 4" | 20:11 |
| 7. | "Should’ve Been in Love (Live in the Studio)" | 3:43 |
| 8. | "Interview pt. 5" | 2:02 |
| 9. | "She’s a Jar (Live in the Studio)" | 4:41 |
| 10. | "Interview pt. 6" | 7:45 |
| 11. | "Ashes of American Flags (Live in the Studio)" | 4:40 |

Super Deluxe Edition - Disc 7
| No. | Title | Length |
|---|---|---|
| 1. | "I Am Trying to Break Your Heart (Live at the Pageant, St. Louis, MO 7/23/02)" | 5:44 |
| 2. | "I’m the Man Who Loves You (Live at the Pageant, St. Louis, MO 7/23/02)" | 4:20 |
| 3. | "War on War (Live at the Pageant, St. Louis, MO 7/23/02)" | 3:59 |
| 4. | "Kamera (Live at the Pageant, St. Louis, MO 7/23/02)" | 3:16 |
| 5. | "Radio Cure (Live at the Pageant, St. Louis, MO 7/23/02)" | 5:37 |
| 6. | "A Shot in the Arm (Live at the Pageant, St. Louis, MO 7/23/02)" | 5:11 |
| 7. | "She’s a Jar (Live at the Pageant, St. Louis, MO 7/23/02)" | 5:32 |
| 8. | "I’m Always in Love (Live at the Pageant, St. Louis, MO 7/23/02)" | 5:21 |
| 9. | "Sunken Treasure (Live at the Pageant, St. Louis, MO 7/23/02)" | 7:09 |
| 10. | "Jesus, Etc. (Live at the Pageant, St. Louis, MO 7/23/02)" | 4:12 |
| 11. | "Heavy Metal Drummer (Live at the Pageant, St. Louis, MO 7/23/02)" | 4:08 |
| 12. | "Pot Kettle Black (Live at the Pageant, St. Louis, MO 7/23/02)" | 4:56 |

Super Deluxe Edition - Disc 8
| No. | Title | Length |
|---|---|---|
| 1. | "Ashes of American Flags (Live at the Pageant, St. Louis, MO 7/23/02)" | 4:43 |
| 2. | "Not for the Season (Laminated Cat) (Live at the Pageant, St. Louis, MO 7/23/02)" | 8:36 |
| 3. | "Reservations (Live at the Pageant, St. Louis, MO 7/23/02)" | 6:53 |
| 4. | "California Stars (Live at the Pageant, St. Louis, MO 7/23/02)" | 6:30 |
| 5. | "Red-Eyed and Blue (Live at the Pageant, St. Louis, MO 7/23/02)" | 2:19 |
| 6. | "I Got You (At the End of the Century) (Live at the Pageant, St. Louis, MO 7/23/02)" | 5:00 |
| 7. | "Misunderstood (Live at the Pageant, St. Louis, MO 7/23/02)" | 6:48 |
| 8. | "Far, Far Away (Live at the Pageant, St. Louis, MO 7/23/02)" | 4:53 |
| 9. | "Outtasite (Outta Mind) (Live at the Pageant, St. Louis, MO 7/23/02)" | 2:35 |
| 10. | "I’m a Wheel (Live at the Pageant, St. Louis, MO 7/23/02)" | 3:34 |

== Personnel ==
Credits according to liner notes.

Wilco

- Jeff Tweedy - vocals, guitar, songwriting
- John Stirratt - bass
- Leroy Bach - multi-instrumentalist
- Glenn Kotche - drums, percussion, sound effects
- Jay Bennett - multi-instrumentalist

Additional musicians

- Craig Christiansen
- Ken Coomer
- Jessy Greene
- Fred Lonberg-Holm
- Jim O'Rourke

Horn and string arrangements

- John Stirratt
- Jeff Tweedy

Technical

- Jay Bennett – engineering
- Chris Brickley – engineering
- Jim O'Rourke – additional engineering, mixing
- Jonathan Parker – additional engineering
- Steve Rooke – mastering

Artwork

- Sam Jones – photography
- Lawrence Azerrad – art direction, design

== Charts ==
=== Weekly charts ===
2001–2002 weekly chart performance for Yankee Hotel Foxtrot
| Chart (2001–2002) | Peak position |
|---|---|
| Australian Albums (ARIA) | 43 |
| French Albums (SNEP) | 124 |
| Irish Albums (IRMA) | 32 |
| Norwegian Albums (VG-lista) | 4 |
| Swedish Albums (Sverigetopplistan) | 24 |
| UK Albums (Official Charts) | 40 |
| US Billboard 200 | 13 |

2022 weekly chart performance for Yankee Hotel Foxtrot
| Chart (2022) | Peak position |
|---|---|
| Belgian Albums (Ultratop Flanders) | 89 |
| Belgian Albums (Ultratop Wallonia) | 142 |
| Hungarian Albums (MAHASZ) | 10 |
| Spanish Albums (Promusicae) | 46 |
| Swiss Albums (Schweizer Hitparade) | 50 |

=== Year-end charts ===
Year-end chart performance for Yankee Hotel Foxtrot
| Chart (2002) | Position |
|---|---|
| Canadian Alternative Albums (Nielsen SoundScan) | 108 |

== Certifications ==
| Region | Certification | Certified units/sales |
|---|---|---|
| United States (RIAA) | Gold | 500,000^{^} |
^{^} Shipments figures based on certification alone.

== See also ==
- The Lonesome Crowded West, a 1997 album by Modest Mouse which also features two towers (The Westin Seattle) on the cover
