= The Dream My Bones Dream =

Studio album by Eiko Ishibashi
- Released: 16 November 2018
- Genre: Avant-pop
- Length: 42:42
- Label: Drag City
- Producer: Jim O'Rourke

Eiko Ishibashi chronology
Car and Freezer (2014)	The Dream My Bones Dream (2018)	Drive My Car (2022)

The Dream My Bones Dream is a studio album by Japanese musician Eiko Ishibashi. It was released on 16 November 2018 through Drag City. It received universal acclaim from critics.

== Background ==
Eiko Ishibashi is a Japanese musician from Chiba Prefecture. The Dream My Bones Dream is her first solo studio album since Car and Freezer (2014). The album's songs were developed after the death of her father, which led her to research a period of his life spent in Manchukuo. The album was released on 16 November 2018 through Drag City. A music video was released for "Iron Veil".

== Critical reception ==
Professional ratings
Aggregate scores
Source	Rating
Metacritic	82/100
Review scores
Source	Rating
Exclaim!	8/10
Pitchfork	7.5/10

According to the review aggregator Metacritic, The Dream My Bones Dream received "universal acclaim" based on a weighted average score of 82 out of 100 from 5 critic scores.

Amanda Farah of The Quietus stated, "Co-produced with and mixed by Ishibashi's longtime collaborator Jim O'Rourke, the album shows shades of her varied works, which encompass an assortment of work with piano, drums and electronics, and some improvisation." Audrey Lockie of SLUG wrote, "In barely more than 40 minutes, Ishibashi and her group of musicians travel through a series of expansive explorations, but the mood is never one but complete emotional outpouring and musical excellency."

=== Accolades ===
Year-end lists for The Dream My Bones Dream
Publication	List	Rank	Ref.
The Vinyl Factory	Our 50 Favourite Albums of 2018	19	
The Wire	Releases of the Year (2018 Rewind)	32	

== Track listing ==
All tracks are written by Eiko Ishibashi.

The Dream My Bones Dream track listing
No.	Title	Length
1.	"Prologue: Hands on the Mouth"	5:13
2.	"Agloe"	5:50
3.	"Iron Veil"	5:21
4.	"Silent Scrapbook"	3:50
5.	"A Ghost in a Train, Thinking"	5:54
6.	"The Dream My Bones Dream"	4:29
7.	"Tunnels to Nowhere"	3:36
8.	"To the East"	3:58
9.	"Epilogue: Innisfree"	4:28
Total length:		42:42
