= Flying Basket =

Studio album by Akira Sakata & Jim O'Rourke with Chikamorachi & Merzbow
- Released: September 18, 2015
- Recorded: June 2013
- Studio: Steamroom, Tokyo
- Genre: Free improvisation
- Length: 71:27
- Label: Family Vineyard
- Producer: Jim O'Rourke

Akira Sakata chronology
KAISHI/開始: Live at Kargart (2015)	Flying Basket (2015)	15.01.14 (2016)

Jim O'Rourke chronology
Arco (2015)	Flying Basket (2015)	Steamroom 20 (2015)

Chikamorachi chronology
Sora Wo Tobu! (2012)	Flying Basket (2015)

Merzbow chronology
Konchuuki (2015)	Flying Basket (2015)	Music for Urbanism (2015)

Professional ratings
Review scores
Source	Rating
The Free Jazz Collective	4.5/5 stars
Inyourspeakers Media	69/100
Pitchfork	7.1/10

Flying Basket (すっ飛び篭, Suttobi kago) is a collaborative studio album by the Japanese free jazz saxophonist Akira Sakata, American experimental guitarist Jim O'Rourke, improv duo Chikamorachi (drummer Chris Corsano and double bassist Darin Gray), and Japanese noise musician Merzbow.

== Track listing ==
CD

No.	Title	Length
1.	"Flying Basket"	71:27

LP

Side one
No.	Title	Length
1.	"Flying Basket, Part 1"	18:29

Side two
No.	Title	Length
1.	"Flying Basket, Part 2"	19:03

Side three
No.	Title	Length
1.	"Flying Basket, Part 3"	15:06

Side four
No.	Title	Length
1.	"Flying Basket, Part 4"	18:49

== Personnel ==
All personnel credits are adapted from the album notes.

=== Musicians ===
- Akira Sakata – alto saxophone, vocals
- Jim O'Rourke – electric guitar, harmonica, electronics
- Chris Corsano – drums
- Darin Gray – double bass, percussion
- Masami Akita – noise electronics

=== Technical personnel ===
- Jeremy Kannapell – collage, jacket design
- Dan Zettwoch – layout assistance, rendering
- Rashad Becker – lacquer cutting, mastering [vinyl version]
