= Loose Fur (album) =

Studio album by Loose Fur
- Released: January 28, 2003
- Recorded: 2000
- Length: 39:19
- Label: Drag City

Loose Fur chronology
Loose Fur (2003)	Born Again in the USA (2006)

Professional ratings
Aggregate scores
Source	Rating
Metacritic	77/100
Review scores
Source	Rating
AllMusic	3/5 stars
Pitchfork Media	(7.2/10)

Loose Fur is the first studio album by the rock band Loose Fur. It was released in 2003 on Drag City.

== Track listing ==
All music by Loose Fur.

1. "Laminated Cat" (lyrics by Jeff Tweedy) – 7:18
2. "Elegant Transaction" (lyrics by Jim O'Rourke) – 6:15
3. "So Long" (lyrics by O'Rourke) – 8:59
4. "You Were Wrong" (lyrics by Tweedy) – 3:33
5. "Liquidation Totale" (instrumental) – 5:37
6. "Chinese Apple" (lyrics by Tweedy) – 7:34

== Credits ==
- Mixed by Jim O'Rourke.
- Engineered by Jeremy Lemos and Kris Poulin.
- Mastered by Konrad Strauss

== Miscellanea ==
- Cover art is from Brian Calvin's 1998 painting, California Free Form.
- The album was recorded in 2000, but not released until early 2003.
