= I'm Happy and I'm Singing and a 1, 2, 3, 4 =

I’m Happy, and I’m Singing, and a 1, 2, 3, 4

Studio album by Jim O'Rourke
- Released: December 14, 2001
- Recorded: 1997–1999
- Venue: Live in New York City, Osaka, and Tokyo (bonus tracks recorded in Toronto and Malmö)
- Genre: Glitch; IDM
- Length: 40:43
- Label: Mego
- Producer: Jim O'Rourke

Jim O'Rourke chronology
Insignificance (2001)	I’m Happy, and I’m Singing, and a 1, 2, 3, 4 (2001)	Mizu No Nai Umi (2005)

Professional ratings
Review scores
Source	Rating
AllMusic	4/5 stars
Pitchfork	9.0/10
Uncut	4/5 stars

I'm Happy, and I'm Singing, and a 1, 2, 3, 4 is an album by American musician Jim O'Rourke. It was released by the label Mego in December 2001.

In 2017, Pitchfork placed it at number 28 on its list of "The 50 Best IDM Albums of All Time".

== Track listing ==
No.	Title	Length
1.	"I'm Happy"	11:13
2.	"And I'm Singing"	8:11
3.	"And a 1, 2, 3, 4"	21:19
Total length:		40:43

2002 P-Vine edition bonus track
No.	Title	Length
4.	"Let's Take It Again from the Top"	4:09

2009 Editions Mego edition bonus disc
No.	Title	Length
1.	"Let's Take It Again from the Top"	4:09
2.	"Getting the Vapors"	39:01
3.	"He Who Laughs"	17:57

2009 P-Vine edition bonus track
No.	Title	Length
4.	"TS Baby" (Hecker Remix)	4:53
