= Yale Udoff =

American screenwriter and playwright

- Born: March 29, 1935; Brooklyn, New York City, U.S.
- Died: July 19, 2018 (aged 83); Burbank, California, U.S.
- Education: Michigan State University; Georgetown University Law Center
- Occupations: Screenwriter, playwright
- Spouse: Sally Shulamit

Yale M. Udoff (March 29, 1935 – July 19, 2018) was an American screenwriter and playwright.

== Early life ==
Udoff was born on March 29, 1935, in Brooklyn, New York City. He graduated from Michigan State University and earned a law degree from the Georgetown University Law Center.

== Career ==
Udoff first worked for CBS, followed by ABC. He worked with producers Roone Arledge, Douglas S. Cramer and Edgar Scherick. In 1980, he was the screenwriter for Bad Timing, directed by Nicolas Roeg. With director Duncan Gibbins, he co-wrote the script for Eve of Destruction in 1991.

Udoff wrote several plays, including The Little Gentleman & The Club and A Gun Play. His Magritte Skies was staged at Playwrights Horizons in New York City in 1976.

== Personal life and death ==
Udoff married Sally Shulamit. She predeceased him in 2010.

Udoff died on July 19, 2018, in Burbank, California.
