= Pareidolia (album) =

Studio album by Eiko Ishibashi and Jim O'Rourke
- Released: August 29, 2025
- Genre: Electronic
- Length: 39:25
- Label: Drag City

Eiko Ishibashi and Jim O'Rourke chronology
Lifetime of a Flower (2023)	Pareidolia (2025)

Pareidolia is a collaborative studio album by Japanese musician Eiko Ishibashi and American musician Jim O'Rourke. It was released on August 29, 2025, through Drag City. It received generally favorable reviews from critics.

== Background ==
Eiko Ishibashi is a Japanese musician from Chiba Prefecture. Jim O'Rourke is an American musician from Chicago. Pareidoria is based on material that the duo played live in France, Switzerland, Italy, and Ireland, in 2023. The duo remixed and edited these recordings to create Pareidolia. It consists of four tracks: "Par", "Ei", "Do", and "Lia". The album was released on August 29, 2025, through Drag City. A music video was released for "Pareidolia (Single Edit)".

== Critical reception ==
Professional ratings
Aggregate scores
Source	Rating
Metacritic	78/100
Review scores
Source	Rating
AllMusic	4/5 stars
Mojo	3/5 stars
Uncut	8/10

According to the review aggregator Metacritic, Pareidolia received "generally favorable reviews" based on a weighted average score of 78 out of 100 from 4 critic scores.

Paul Simpson of AllMusic commented that "This album finds synergies within different performances, and constructs a more fleshed-out, finalized version of their live sets." He added, "Pareidolia feels unique in the way it visits several places at the same time, and finds a way to fold them into one." Jon Dale of Uncut wrote, "the greatest pleasure of its four eloquent tracks comes from the way the duo hint at narrative, delicately suturing disparate sounds to build a complex electro-acoustic suite."

=== Accolades ===
Year-end lists for Pareidolia
Publication	List	Rank	Ref.
AllMusic	Favorite Electronic Albums	—	
Pitchfork	The 30 Best Electronic Albums of 2025	9	

== Track listing ==
Pareidolia track listing
No.	Title	Length
1.	"Par"	10:19
2.	"Ei"	10:01
3.	"Do"	10:57
4.	"Lia"	8:08
Total length:		39:25

Bandcamp edition bonus track
No.	Title	Length
5.	"Pareidolia (Single Edit)"	3:15
Total length:		42:40
