= The Creeping Garden =

- Film poster
- Directed by: Tim Grabham, Jasper Sharp
- Music by: Jim O’Rourke
- Release date: July 27, 2014 (Fantasia Film Festival)
- Running time: 81 minutes
- Country: UK
- Language: English

The Creeping Garden is a 2014 British documentary film featuring various kinds of slime molds. The film uses retro cinematography and electronic music to enhance a connection between slime molds and sci-fi films such as Phase IV, Invasion of the Body Snatchers, and The Blob.

== Plot ==
The film describes the life and development of the various types of slime molds with the aid of experts and artists involved in their study. The directors involved Mark Pragnell, an amateur observer of slime mold who studies them in their natural element in the forest. Pragnell appears in several scenes in the film offering his observations.

Also appearing in the film are a visual artist, a computer scientist, a composer and others who describe the creative use of slime molds in their fields. Eduardo Reck Miranda, a composer, is seen playing the piano, while "jamming" with sounds produced by the slime mold as it gets electrically stimulated. Mycologists, myxomycologists and robotics engineers also appear. Amongst other things, the film shows that the growth patterns of the molds have similarities to the development of highways connecting cities together.

== Production ==
The music theme was composed by Jim O’Rourke.

The cinematography of the film uses techniques borrowed from 70s sci-fi films like Phase IV, Invasion of the Body Snatchers, and The Blob, to indicate the similarity between the sci-fi genre and the behaviour of slime molds. To further enhance the sci-fi connection, the film uses retro electronic music and the typeface of its titles is reminiscent of the 1970s futuristic fonts. The film is presented in widescreen mode and scenes include showing slime molds moving using time-lapse photography.

According to the film website, the film poster was "loosely inspired" by the film posters of The Andromeda Strain and Phase IV. The same website also mentions that the two films were "a significant reference point for the making of The Creeping Garden". The poster was designed by iloobia, a London-based artist.

== Release ==
The film premiered at the 2015 Fantasia International Film Festival in Montreal. Subsequent festival screenings include the 2015 Hot Docs Canadian International Documentary Festival.

=== Critical response ===
The film received positive reviews. Variety comments that the film "is much more entertaining than one could reasonably expect." and calls its cinematography "handsome". The magazine also describes the film as "good-humored but not campy in its regard of some genuinely fascinating research, and full of trippy visuals" and concludes "this science-fair bonanza would have been a midnight staple in the era of “The Hellstrom Chronicles.”"

Screendaily.com comments that there is a "visual similarity to the alien invader in that 1950s sci-fi classic The Blob" and that "The mood of the film is enhanced thanks to the soundtrack by sometime Sonic Youth member Jim O’Rourke, which helps enhance an aural background to often-hypnotic images." Screendaily.com also mentions that the film showcases the classification debate centering on the slime molds as to the exact kind of life form that they are supposed to be. The magazine praises the balance the film strikes between hosting the views of experts and showing how the molds develop and grow and even find their way through mazes in search for food such as oats, which is placed by researchers as "bait".

Toronto Film Scene calls the film "highly entertaining" but never "over the top". The magazine also mentions "a pretty hilarious thought experiment where a gaggle of humans turns out to be barely as smart as a slime mould". The Hollywood Reporter review mentions that "the hypnotic film may be too obscure for a broad art house run. But like its subjects, which grow beneath our feet in the undergrowth of forests, it should thrive in special engagements and at festivals whose attendees seek things most moviegoers wouldn't think to look at."

=== Accolades ===
Awards for the film include the best director prize in the Documentary Features category at the 2014 Fantastic Fest in Austin, Texas.
