= Two Nice Catholic Boys =

Studio album by Loren Connors and Jim O'Rourke
- Released: January 20, 2009
- Length: 47:01
- Label: Family Vineyard

Loren Connors and Jim O'Rourke chronology
In Bern (1999)	Two Nice Catholic Boys (2009)

Two Nice Catholic Boys is a collaborative studio album by American guitarists Loren Connors and Jim O'Rourke. It was released on January 20, 2009, through Family Vineyard.

== Background ==
Loren Connors and Jim O'Rourke recorded improvisations during a 1997 Europe tour. Years later, O'Rourke edited the material to create Two Nice Catholic Boys. The album consists of three tracks: "Maybe Paris", "Or Possibly Koln", and "Most Definitely Not Koln". It was released on January 20, 2009, through Family Vineyard.

Connors and O'Rourke also released a collaborative album, In Bern, in 1999.

== Critical reception ==
Professional ratings
Review scores
Source	Rating
AllMusic	3.5/5 stars
Consequence	B
Drowned in Sound	7/10
Pitchfork	7.2/10
PopMatters	7/10 stars
Tiny Mix Tapes	4/5 stars

Gabriel Keehn of Tiny Mix Tapes stated, "Both members of the duo, without openly sacrificing or dumbing down their own personal styles, open themselves up to the other, allowing for some beautiful cross-pollination of sound." He added, "The tracks ebb and flow naturally between rumbling, fuzzy bits and the sort of delicate and crystalline formations for which Connors is famous." Adam Kivel of Consequence commented that "This album might not quite live up to a combination of the pair's impressive credentials, but it's certainly an interesting recording of two musicians at the top of their game."

== Track listing ==
Two Nice Catholic Boys track listing
No.	Title	Length
1.	"Maybe Paris"	22:05
2.	"Or Possibly Koln"	14:16
3.	"Most Definitely Not Koln"	10:40
Total length:		47:01

== Personnel ==
Credits adapted from liner notes.

- Loren Connors – electric guitar
- Jim O'Rourke – electric guitar
