= Alpha Mike Foxtrot: Rare Tracks 1994–2014 =

Compilation album by Wilco
- Released: November 17, 2014
- Genres: Alternative rock; indie rock; alternative country; folk rock
- Length: 4:39:00
- Label: Nonesuch
- Producer: Cheryl Pawelski

Wilco chronology
What's Your 20? Essential Tracks 1994–2014 (2011)	Alpha Mike Foxtrot: Rare Tracks 1994–2014 (2014)	Star Wars (2015)

Alpha Mike Foxtrot: Rare Tracks 1994–2014 ratings
Aggregate scores
Source	Rating
Metacritic	84/100
Review scores
Source	Rating
AllMusic	4.5/5 stars
Mojo	4/5 stars
Paste	8.5/10
Pitchfork	7.0/10
PopMatters	8/10
Q	3/5 stars
Record Collector	3/5 stars
Rolling Stone	4.5/5 stars
Slant Magazine	4/5 stars
Uncut	8/10

Alpha Mike Foxtrot: Rare Tracks 1994–2014 is a compilation album released in November 2014 by the indie rock band Wilco. The album is a 4 disc collection of demos, live recordings, and b-sides that date between 1994 and 2014. Among its contents is the band's earliest released recording, a duet with Syd Straw of the Ernest Tubb song "The T.B. is Whipping Me", which had been recorded for the 1994 compilation Red Hot + Country. The compilation was assembled and produced by Cheryl Pawelski, with Jeff Tweedy, Tony Margherita and Deb Bernardini.

== Track listing ==
Disc 1

1. Childlike and Evergreen (Demo)
2. Someone Else's Song (Demo)
3. Passenger Side (Demo)
4. Promising - 3:02
5. The T.B. Is Whipping Me (with Syd Straw)
6. I Must Be High (Live)
7. Casino Queen (Live)
8. Who Were You Thinking Of (Live)
9. I Am Not Willing (with Syd Straw)
10. Burned
11. Blasting Fonda
12. Thirteen
13. Don't You Honey Me
14. The Lonely 1 (White Hen Version)
15. No More Poetry
16. Box Full of Letters (Live)
17. Red-Eyed And Blue (Live)
18. Forget The Flowers (Live)
19. Sunken Treasure (Live)
20. Monday (Demo)

Disc 2

1. Passenger Side (Live)
2. Outtasite (Outta Mind) [Live]
3. I Got You At the End of the Century (Live)
4. Outta Mind (Outta Site) [Live]
5. James Alley Blues (with Roger McGuinn) [Live]
6. At My Window Sad And Lonely (Jeff Tweedy Solo Version)
7. California Stars (Live)
8. One Hundred Years From Now
9. A Shot In The Arm (Remix)
10. ELT (King Size Demo Version)
11. Nothing'severgonnastandinmyway (again) [David Kahne Remix]
12. She's A Jar (Austin Demo Version)
13. Tried And True
14. Student Loan Stereo
15. True Love Will Find You In The End
16. I'm Always In Love (Live)
17. Via Chicago (Austin Demo Version)
18. Can't Stand It (Live)
19. Airline To Heaven (Alternate Version)
20. Any Major Dude Will Tell You

Disc 3

1. I'm The Man Who Loves You (Live)
2. The Good Part
3. Cars Can't Escape
4. Camera
5. Handshake Drugs (First Version)
6. A Magazine Called Sunset
7. Bob Dylan's 49th Beard
8. Woodgrain
9. More Like The Moon
10. Let Me Come Home
11. Old Maid
12. Hummingbird (Alternate Version)
13. Spiders (Kidsmoke) [Live]
14. Hell Is Chrome (Live)
15. At Least That's What You Said (Live)
16. The Late Greats (Live)
17. Just A Kid (with The Blisters)
18. Kicking Television

Disc 4

1. Panthers
2. Theologians (Live)
3. Another Man's Done Gone (Live)
4. I'm A Wheel (Live)
5. How To Fight Loneliness (Live)
6. One True Vine
7. The Thanks I Get
8. Let's Not Get Carried Away
9. Hate It Here
10. Impossible Germany (Live)
11. I Shall Be Released (with Fleet Foxes) [Live]
12. What Light
13. Jesus Etc. (with Andrew Bird) [Live]
14. Glad It's Over
15. Dark Neon
16. The Jolly Banker
17. Unlikely Japan
18. You And I (Live)
19. I Love My Label
