= Halfway to a Threeway =

EP by Jim O'Rourke
- Released: November 22, 1999
- Recorded: January – August 1999
- Genres: Indie rock; folk rock; math rock
- Length: 21:21
- Labels: Drag City; Domino
- Producers: Jim O'Rourke; Jeremy Lemos; Konrad Strauss

Jim O'Rourke chronology
Eureka (1999)	Halfway to a Threeway (1999)	Insignificance (2001)

Professional ratings
Review scores
Source	Rating
AllMusic	4/5 stars
Pitchfork	8.0/10

Halfway to a Threeway is an EP by American musician Jim O'Rourke. It was released by Drag City in 1999.

The EP is referenced in the song "Will Get Fooled Again" by Max Tundra, from his album Parallax Error Beheads You. An episode of television show Reginald the Vampire is named "Halfway to a Threeway".

== Critical reception ==
Exclaim! called the EP "one of Jim O'Rourke's true crowning achievements", writing that it "shows the 'Chicago sound' at the height of its powers". The Independent called the title track "a gorgeous, wistful lullaby".

== Track listing ==
No.	Title	Length
1.	"Fuzzy Sun"	2:34
2.	"Not Sport, Martial Art"	6:51
3.	"The Workplace"	7:42
4.	"Halfway to a Threeway"	4:14
Total length:		21:21

== Personnel ==
Main personnel

- Jim O'Rourke – vocals, guitars, piano (1–3), organ (2), percussion (1–2)
- Glenn Kotche – drums (1, 3)
- Darin Gray – bass guitar (1–3)
- Frank Navin – vocals (1)
- Rob Mazurek – cornet (2, 3)
- Tim Barnes – drums (2)
- Archer Prewitt – vocals (3)
- Sam Prekop – vocals (3)

Technical personnel

- Jeremy Lemos – assistant engineer, recording
- Konrad Strauss – mastering
- Jim Newberry – photography
