= Eiko Ishibashi =

Japanese singer-songwriter and musician

Eiko Ishibashi 石橋 英子
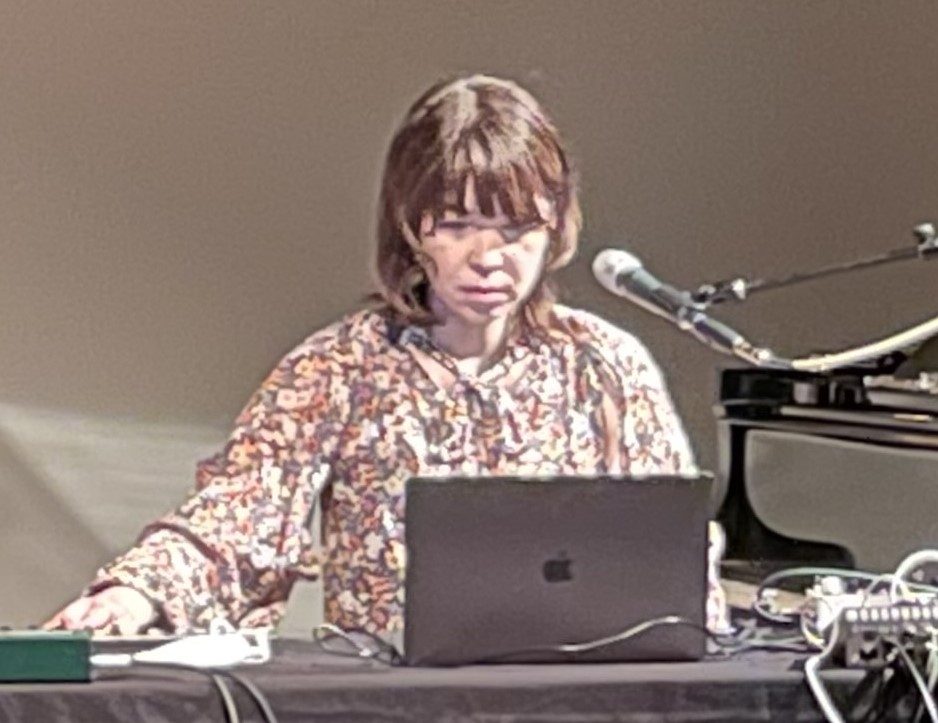
- Ishibashi in 2022

Background information
- Origin: Mobara, Chiba, Japan
- Occupations: Musician; singer-songwriter; producer
- Instruments: Vocals; piano; drums
- Years active: 2006–present
- Labels: Black Truffle; Drag City; Felicity; Rhythm Tracks
- Member of: Kafka's Ibiki; RNA
- Website: Official website

Eiko Ishibashi (石橋 英子, Ishibashi Eiko) is a Japanese singer-songwriter and musician. She composed the scores for the films Drive My Car (2021) and Evil Does Not Exist (2023).

== Career ==
Ishibashi has frequently worked with Jim O'Rourke, with O'Rourke producing several of her albums and Ishibashi playing on his album Simple Songs. Together with Tatsuhisa Yamamoto they formed the band Kafka's Ibiki.

In 2016, Ishibashi released Kouen Kyoudai, a collaborative album with the Japanese noise musician Masami Akita (better known as Merzbow). In 2018, she released The Dream My Bones Dream.

She composed the music for the 2019 anime Blade of the Immortal. She has collaborated with director Ryusuke Hamaguchi on three projects: the 2021 film Drive My Car, the 2023 film Evil Does Not Exist, and the 2023 film Gift.

In 2025, she released a solo album, Antigone, as well as Pareidolia, a collaborative album with O'Rourke.

== Personal life ==
As of at least 2022, Ishibashi has been in a relationship with American musician Jim O'Rourke. The two met when Ishibashi played flute on a Burt Bacharach covers album O'Rourke was producing. They live and work closely together, but "keep a professional distance, sending each other data files to work on rather than jamming."

== Discography ==
=== Studio albums ===
- Works for Everything (Rhythm Tracks, 2006)
- Lola and Soda (with Achico; Rhythm Tracks, 2007)
- Slip Beneath the Distant Tree (with Tatsuya Yoshida; Rhythm Tracks, 2007)
- Summer Dress (with Achico; Rhythm Tracks, 2008)
- Drifting Devil (Rhythm Tracks, 2008)
- Carapace (Felicity, 2011)
- Imitation of Life (Felicity/Drag City, 2012)
- I'm Armed (Felicity, 2012)
- Car and Freezer (Felicity/Drag City, 2014)
- Compressed Happiness (with K2; Phage Tapes, 2014)
- Kouen Kyoudai (with Masami Akita; Editions Mego, 2016)
- Ichida (with Darin Gray; Black Truffle, 2018)
- The Dream My Bones Dream (Drag City, 2018)
- For McCoy (Black Truffle, 2022)
- Antigone (Drag City, 2025)
- Pareidolia (with Jim O'Rourke; Drag City, 2025)

=== Soundtrack albums ===
- Mugen no Juunin: Immortal (Pony Canyon, 2020)
- Drive My Car (Newhere/Space Shower, 2022)
- Evil Does Not Exist (Drag City, 2024)

== Filmography ==
=== Film ===
- Drive My Car (2021)
- Evil Does Not Exist (2023)
- Gift (2023)

=== Television ===
- Blade of the Immortal (2019)
