= Born Again in the USA =

Studio album by Loose Fur
- Released: March 21, 2006
- Length: 37:52
- Label: Drag City

Loose Fur chronology
Loose Fur (2003)	Born Again in the USA (2006)

Professional ratings
Aggregate scores
Source	Rating
Metacritic	72/100
Review scores
Source	Rating
AllMusic	4/5 stars
Pitchfork	(7.3/10)
Prefix	(6/10)

Born Again in the USA is the second and final studio album by Loose Fur. The album was released on March 21, 2006.

== Track listing ==
1. "Hey Chicken" – 3:02
2. "The Ruling Class" – 3:35
3. "Answers to Your Questions" – 4:58
4. "Apostolic" – 2:48
5. "Stupid as the Sun" – 2:33
6. "Pretty Sparks" – 3:12
7. "An Ecumenical Matter" – 3:20
8. "Thou Shalt Wilt" – 2:47
9. "Wreckroom" – 8:36
10. "Wanted" – 3:00
