= Loren Mazzacane Connors =

Loren Connors
- Born: October 22, 1949 (age 76); New Haven, Connecticut, United States
- Genres: Avant-garde; folk; blues; experimental
- Occupation: Musician
- Instrument: Guitar
- Years active: 1978–present
- Labels: Northern Spy; Road Cone; Daggett; Family Vineyard; Table of the Elements
- Website: lorenconnors.net

Loren Mazzacane Connors (born October 22, 1949) is an American guitarist who has recorded and performed under several different names: Guitar Roberts, Loren Mazzacane, Loren Mattei, and currently Loren Connors. His music has touched on many genres, but often features an abstract or experimental version of blues and folk styles.

== Biography ==
Connors was born in New Haven, Connecticut, United States, and studied art at Southern Connecticut State University and the University of Cincinnati in the early 1970s, before deciding to pursue music rather than painting.

Best known as a composer and improviser on acoustic and electric guitar, Connors has released over 50 albums, on commercial record labels such as Family Vineyard, Table of the Elements, Recital and Father Yod as well as on his own Black Label, St. Joan and Daggett self-publishing imprints. They include spare solo and duo blues, ensemble experimental jazz, noise, drones, and avant garde rock.

An early champion of his music was Dr. William Ferris, noted blues historian who served as head of the National Endowment for the Arts under the Clinton Administration. Connors made contact with him in the late 1970s, while Dr. Ferris was teaching at Yale University. Although Ferris did not know it at the time, Connors was the janitor who cleaned his office. Many years later, Ferris wrote the liner notes for a sweeping compilation CD set of Connors's seven-inch recordings, called "Night Through."

From 1978 to 1984, Connors recorded a series of mostly solo blues abstractions, releasing them in limited amounts on his Daggett label, later reissued in a joint effort by Byron Coley, Thurston Moore on the Ecstatic Peace label in 1999, mastered by Jim O’Rourke, in part to celebrate Connors's 50th birthday. Cadence Magazine noted at the time that he was “similar to others in the Advanced Guard of improvising guitarists in that he is trying to extend the boundaries of sound and pitch of acoustic guitar, but he is unique in the utilization of Blues in his work, one could almost say this is Avant Garde Blues.” From 1981 to 1984, Connors released six limited edition albums with folksinger Kath Bloom, including traditional songs and Bloom originals.

In the mid-1980s, Connors took a partial break from music and honed his compositional skills by focusing on the art of haiku. He received the 1987 Lafcadio Hearn Award, and he and life partner Suzanne Langille also co-wrote an article on blues and haiku, "The Dancing Ear," published in the Haiku Society of America's journal. (A book of Connors's work from this period, Autumn Sun, was re-released by Thurston Moore and Byron Coley a couple decades later.) He wrote under the name Loren Mattei, and a music recording from this period, Ribbon o' Blues, was also released under that name.

Soon after returning to music, Connors began working with layered tracks. The first of this period was the In Pittsburgh album, released in 1989, later reissued by the Dexter's Cigar label in 1996. He moved to New York City in 1990, where he continued using the multi-track approach through the 1990s. Langille's vocals were featured on several recordings, and she also helped edit his suites. Many of these releases were on the RoadCone label, managed by Mike Hinds. During this period Connors introduced an abstracted undercurrent of Irish themes and melodic influences, while eschewing formal structure, with the Hell’s Kitchen Park CD being a hallmark of this added influence.

Such 1990s recordings were interspersed with recordings of live performances of guitar duets. The first of those recordings was with Japanese guitarist Keiji Haino, introduced to Connors by WFMU DJ David Newgarten, who then produced the recording, released in 1995. This was followed by the first of several recordings with guitarist Alan Licht in 1996, and with Thurston Moore and others.

In the mid-to-late 1990s he led the blues-rock group Haunted House with Langille, Andrew Burnes (of the band San Agustin), and percussionist Neel Murgai. Connors and Langille also joined with San Agustin's David Daniell and Burnes for a recording on the Secretly Canadian label. In the late 1990s, Connors and John Fahey met at a Chicago event, introduced by guitarist Jim O'Rourke. Fahey, who died in 2001, included on his last CD, released posthumously in 2003, a piece called, "Red Cross, Disciple of Christ Today (for Guitar Roberts)," referring to Connors's nickname. In the mid-2000s, Connors met and performed with Jandek, a long-time improviser whose unique independence and originality had often been compared to Connors's. He worked very closely with poet Steve Dalachinsky (who died in 2019) and also with multi-instrumentalist Daniel Carter.

From 1999 through the present, Connors has focused on extended solo improvisational recordings, including the Departing of a Dream series, his tribute to Miles Davis. His main record label for these recordings has been Family Vineyard, managed by Eric Weddle.

In 2003, he composed and recorded a score for the film Why Can’t I Stop This Uncontrollable Dancing?. In 2009, Connors's piece, “Airs No. 3,” appeared in the soundtrack for the French-language film, Le Premier Cercle (“The Ultimate Heist), by director Laurent Tuel, featuring Jean Reno.

In 2012, his composition, "The Murder of Joan of Arc," was used as one of two alternative soundtracks for a reissue by Criterion Collection and Eureka Entertainment of Carl Dreyer's silent film, The Passion of Joan of Arc.

In the mid-to-late 2010s, Connors took up painting again, while continuing his music composing and performing. An art show of a series of acrylic paintings on Belgium linen canvas entitled "Wildweeds" was hosted at the Artists Space in Manhattan in the fall of 2018.

Connors was diagnosed with Parkinson's disease in 1992. He continues to perform and record. Some of Connors' works are archived at the Blues Archive of the University of Mississippi. The University of South Carolina has a comprehensive archive of Connors' recordings and materials.

== Selected discography ==
=== 1978–1984: Avant garde blues abstractions ===
- The Curse of Midnight Mary (Family Vineyard, LP/CD release of late 1970s solo recording, issued in 2009)
- Acoustic Guitar / Gifts (Daggett, 1978 LP)
- Fields with Kath Bloom (Daggett, 1978 LP)
- Unaccompanied Acoustic Guitar Improvisations Vol. 1-8 (Daggett, 1979-1980 LPs, reissued on CD in 1999 by Ecstatic Yod; a reissue on vinyl by Negative Glam began in 2022)
- Unaccompanied Acoustic Guitar Improvisations Vol. 10 (Blank Forms, LP release of late 1970s live performance discovered in Columbia University music library, issued 2018)
- Violets featuring Elizabeth Walker (St. Joan, 1984 LP)

=== 1981–1988: Folk or blues song accompaniment, including instrumental improvisations in Crotty and 1988 releases ===
- Robert Crotty with Me with Robert Crotty (Family Vineyard, 2017 LP release of late 1970s to early 1980s recordings )
- Hanford, Bloom and Mazzacane with Tom Hanford and Kath Bloom (Daggett, 1981 LP)
- Round His Shoulders Gonna Be a Rainbow with Kath Bloom (Daggett, 1982 LP)
- Sing The Children Over with Kath Bloom (Ambiguous Records, 1982 LP)
- Sand in My Shoe with Kath Bloom (St. Joan, 1983 LP)
- Restless Faithful Desperate with Kath Bloom (St. Joan, 1984 LP)
- Moonlight with Kath Bloom (St. Joan, 1984 LP)
- Bluesmaster with Suzanne Langille (St. Joan, 1988 LP)
- Bluesmaster 2: The Dome Room Concert with Suzanne Langille (St. Joan, 1988 LP)

=== 1989–2001: Thematic solo suites of airs and other pieces, usually recorded with two or more tracks; occasional vocals ===
- In Pittsburgh featuring Suzanne Langille (St. Joan, 1989 LP)
- The Dark Paintings of Mark Rothko (St. Joan, 1990 LP)
- Hell's Kitchen Park featuring Suzanne Langille (Black Label, 1993 CD)
- Moonyean featuring Suzanne Langille (Road Cone, 1994 CD)
- 9th Avenue (Black Label, 1995 CD)
- Long Nights (Table of the Elements, 1995 CD)
- Crucible with Suzanne Langille (Black Label, 1996 CD)
- The Carmelites (P-Vine Records, 1997 CD)
- Hell! Hell! Hell! Hell! Hell! (Lotus Sound, 1997 CD)
- Calloden Harvest (Road Cone, 1997 CD)
- The Carmelites (P-Vine, 1997 CD)
- A Possible Dawn (hatNOIR, 1998 CD)
- Evangeline featuring Suzanne Langille (Road Cone, 1998 CD)
- The Enchanted Forest with Suzanne Langille (Secretly Canadian, 1998 LP/CD)
- St. Vincent's Newsboy Home (Item, 1999 CD)
- Airs (Road Cone, 1999 CD)
- Portrait of a Soul (FBWL, 2000 CD)
- The Little Match Girl (Road Cone, 2001 CD)
- Lullaby (Carbon, 2001 CD)
- In Twilight (Alien8, 2001 CD)

=== 1995–present: Collaborations with other instrumentalists ===
- Live at Downtown Music Gallery with Keiji Haino (Persona Non Grata/Father Yod, 1995 CD)
- Live in NYC with Alan Licht (New World of Sound, 1996 LP)
- Hoffman Estates with Alan Licht, Jim O'Rourke, Darin Gray, Josh Abrams (Drag City, 1998 LP/CD)
- The Lost Mariner with Darin Gray (Family Vineyard, 1999 CD)
- In Bern with Jim O'Rourke (hatNOIR, 1999 CD)
- This Past Spring with Darin Gray (Family Vineyard, 2001 CD)
- Arborvitae with David Grubbs (Hapna, 2003 C D)
- In France with Alan Licht (FBWL, 2003 CD)
- Meditations On the Ascension of Blind Joe Death Vol. 1 with Christina Carter (Ecstatic Yod, 2005 LP)
- Two Nice Catholic Boys with Jim O'Rourke (Family Vineyard, 2009 CD)
- Into the Night Sky with Alan Licht (Family Vineyard, 2010 CD)
- The Only Way to Go Is Straight Through with Thurston Moore (Northern Spy, 2013 LP)
- Light with Clint Heidorn (Family Vineyard, 2016 LP)
- Tom Carter/Loren Connors with Tom Carter (Family Vineyard, 2016 LP)
- The Departing of a Dream Vol. VII with Daniel Carter (Family Vineyard, 2019 LP)
- Loren Connors & Kim Gordon at Issue (Alara, 2021 LP)
- At the Top of the Stairs with Alan Licht (Family Vineyard 2022 LP)
- Somewhere in the Wind with David Grubbs (Room40, 2026 LP)

=== 1999–present: Extended blues or readings with improvisational composition ===
- Let the Darkness Fall with Suzanne Langille, David Daniell and Andrew Burnes (Secretly Canadian, 1999 CD)
- Thin Air with poet Steve Dalachinsky (Silver Wonder, 2007 CD)
- Cosmic Debris Vol. V with Haunted House band (Connors, Langille, Burnes and Neel Murgai) and My Cat Is an Alien (Opax, 2008 LP)
- Blue Ghost Blues with Haunted House band (Connors, Langille, Burnes, Murgai) (Northern Spy, 2011 LP/CD)
- I Wish I Didn't Dream with Suzanne Langille (Northern Spy, 2012 CD)
- Blue Ghost Blues/Strong & Foolish Heart with Suzanne Langille (Tanuki, 2016 EP)
- Frankie and Johnny with Haunted House band (Connors, Langille, Burnes, Murgai) (Black Label with Family Vineyard, 2022 LP 10”)

=== 1998–present: Extended solo improvisational compositions ===
- The Bridge (Megalon, 1998 CD)
- The Departing of a Dream (Family Vineyard, 2002 CD)
- The Departing of a Dream Vol. II (Family Vineyard, 2003 LP)
- The Murder of Joan of Arc (Table of the Elements, 2003 LP)
- The Departing of a Dream Vol. III: Juliet (Family Vineyard, 2004 CD)
- Sails featuring John Fahey (Table of the Elements, 2006 CD)
- The Hymn of the North Star (Family Vineyard, 2007 LP)
- The Moon last night (Family Vineyard, FV61, 2008, EP 12inch 45RPM tranparent yellow)
- Red Mars featuring bassist Margarida Garcia (Family Vineyard, 2011 EP)
- A Fire (Family Vineyard, 2013 CD)
- My Brooklyn (Analogpath, 2014 CD)
- Loren Connors/Vapour Theories (Carbon, 2014 LP)
- Live in New York (Family Vineyard, 2015 CD)
- The Departing of a Dream Vol. V (Family Vineyard, 2016 LP 10”)
- The Departing of a Dream Vol. VI (Family Vineyard, 2016 LP 10”)
- Angels That Fall (Family Vineyard, 2017 LP)
- Beautiful Dreamer dedicated to Steve Dalachinsky (Family Vineyard, 2020 LP 10”)
- Domain of the Wind (Family Vineyard, 2021 LP)
