= Heavy Metal Drummer =

Single by Wilco

from the album Yankee Hotel Foxtrot
- Released: April 23, 2002
- Studio: The Loft, Chicago
- Genre: Indie rock
- Length: 3:08
- Label: Nonesuch
- Songwriter: Jeff Tweedy
- Lyricist: Jeff Tweedy
- Producer: Wilco

Wilco singles chronology
"Secret of the Sea" (2000)	"Heavy Metal Drummer" (2002)	"War on War" (2002)

"Heavy Metal Drummer" is a song by American alternative rock band Wilco, released on April 23, 2002, as the lead single from their critically acclaimed 2002 album Yankee Hotel Foxtrot.

Written by Jeff Tweedy, the lyrics describe a nostalgic reminiscence of "those heavy metal bands" Tweedy used to go see "on the Landing in the summer."

== Reception ==
A favorite of fans and critics alike, the song is considered one of Wilco's best, and one of the greatest alt rock songs of the 2000s. Rolling Stone named "Heavy Metal Drummer" as the 411th greatest song of all time on its 2021 updated list of the "500 Greatest Songs of All Time".

== Personnel ==
- Jeff Tweedy – vocals, guitar
- Jay Bennett – keyboards, backing vocals
- John Stirratt – bass guitar, backing vocals
- Glenn Kotche – drums, percussion
- Leroy Bach – keyboards, guitar

== In popular culture ==
Indie rock band Slaughter Beach, Dog's 2017 song "104 Degrees" concludes with the line "She says: 'I love this song', then turns away and tracks the clouds; the driver curses with conviction, while "Heavy Metal Drummer" plays us out".
