= Bad Timing (album) =

Studio album by Jim O'Rourke
- Released: August 25, 1997
- Recorded: 1997
- Genres: American primitivism; post-rock
- Length: 44:06
- Label: Drag City
- Producer: Jim O'Rourke

Jim O'Rourke chronology
Happy Days (1997)	Bad Timing (1997)	Eureka (1999)

Professional ratings
Review scores
Source	Rating
AllMusic	4.5/5 stars
The Encyclopedia of Popular Music	4/5 stars
MusicHound Rock: The Essential Album Guide	4/5 stars
Pitchfork Media	9.1/10

Bad Timing is a studio album by American musician Jim O'Rourke, released on August 25, 1997 by Drag City, his first album with the label. Although O'Rourke had previously established himself with a prolific output of experimental music beginning in the late 1980s, the album marked the beginning of his series of albums released by Drag City focusing on more traditional instrumentation and song structures. It is an instrumental album, consisting largely of O'Rourke's acoustic guitar playing (much in the style of John Fahey), sometimes with additional instrumentation.

The album is named after the 1980 film Bad Timing: A Sensual Obsession, directed by Nicolas Roeg. It is one of a trio of O'Rourke albums, along with Eureka and Insignificance, to be named after Roeg films from the 1980s.

== Critical reception ==
MusicHound Rock: The Essential Album Guide wrote that the album's "four long, shape-shifting instrumentals blend O'Rourke's finger-picking with electronic textures and orchestrations for horns and string that abruptly, mischievously change mood." Tiny Mix Tapes wrote that the album "shows O’Rourke taking his John Fahey worship to a majestic extreme." Tom Ewing of Freaky Trigger named it his third favorite album of the 1990s, describing it as a beautiful album in which O'Rourke abandons noise for an intimate sound.

== Track listing ==
All tracks are written by Jim O'Rourke.

No.	Title	Length
1.	"There's Hell in Hello But More in Goodbye"	9:37
2.	"94 the Long Way"	13:58
3.	"Bad Timing"	10:00
4.	"Happy Trails"	10:33
Total length:		44:06
