= Eureka (Jim O'Rourke album) =

Studio album by Jim O'Rourke
- Released: February 25, 1999
- Recorded: July 1997 – December 1998
- Studios: Steamroom, Solid Sound (Chicago)
- Genres: Symphonic pop; chamber pop; pop rock
- Length: 42:08
- Label: Drag City
- Producer: Jim O'Rourke

Jim O'Rourke chronology
Bad Timing (1997)	Eureka (1999)	Halfway to a Threeway (1999)

Professional ratings
Review scores
Source	Rating
AllMusic	4.5/5 stars
Entertainment Weekly	B
NME	8/10
Pitchfork	5.3/10

Eureka is an album by Jim O'Rourke, originally released on February 25, 1999, by Drag City. It is named after the Nicolas Roeg film of the same name. Several of the track titles references pieces and performances by artist Chris Burden. NME named it the 16th best album of 1999. In 2012, Fact placed it at number 24 on the "100 Best Albums of the 1990s" list.

U2 played a version of O'Rourke's recording of "Women of the World" in the encore of their 2018 Experience + Innocence Tour.

== Track listing ==
All tracks are written by Jim O'Rourke, except where noted.

No.	Title	Writer(s)	Length
1.	"Prelude to 110 or 220 / Women of the World"	O'Rourke; Ivor Cutler	8:46
2.	"Ghost Ship in a Storm"		3:54
3.	"Movie on the Way Down"		7:37
4.	"Through the Night Softly"		4:47
5.	"Please Patronize Our Sponsors"		3:04
6.	"Something Big"	Burt Bacharach; Hal David	3:13
7.	"Eureka"		9:11
8.	"Happy Holidays"		1:36
Total length:			42:08

Japanese edition bonus track
No.	Title	Length
9.	"Little Island Walking"	4:36
Total length:		46:44

== Personnel ==
Credits adapted from liner notes.

- Jim O'Rourke – vocals, guitar, bass guitar, piano, organ, synthesizer, bells
- Brian Calvin – backing vocals (1)
- Jeff Stafford – backing vocals (1)
- Jennifer Peterson – backing vocals (1)
- Maureen Loughnane – backing vocals (1)
- Edith Frost – backing vocals (6)
- Teria Gartelos – backing vocals (6)
- Julie Pomerleau – violin (1, 3, 4, 6), viola (1, 3, 4, 6)
- Fred Lonberg-Holm – cello (1, 4, 5)
- Joan Morrone – French horn (2, 5, 8)
- Jeb Bishop – trombone (3, 5, 6, 7)
- Rob Mazurek – cornet (3, 5)
- Bob Weston – trumpet (3, 7)
- Mike Colligan – clarinet (4)
- Ken Vandermark – saxophone (4)
- Richard Skabbs – organ (1)
- Darin Gray – bass guitar (2, 5, 8)
- Ken Champion – pedal steel guitar (2, 5, 8), piano (2, 5, 8)
- Rian Murphy – drums (4)
- Glenn Kotche – drums (1, 2, 5, 8), percussion (3)
- Tim Barnes – percussion (1, 2, 5)
- Steve Butters – percussion (4)
