= Evil Does Not Exist =

2023 film by Ryusuke Hamaguchi

- Theatrical release poster

Japanese name
- Kanji: 悪は存在しない
Transcriptions
- Revised Hepburn: Aku wa Sonzai Shinai
- Directed by: Ryusuke Hamaguchi
- Written by: Ryusuke Hamaguchi
- Produced by: Satoshi Takata
- Starring: Hitoshi Omika; Ryo Nishikawa; Ryuji Kosaka; Ayaka Shibutani
- Cinematography: Yoshio Kitagawa
- Edited by: Ryusuke Hamaguchi; Azusa Yamazaki
- Music by: Eiko Ishibashi
- Production company: NEOPA Inc.
- Distributed by: Incline
- Release dates: 4 September 2023 (Venice); 26 April 2024 (Japan)
- Running time: 106 minutes
- Country: Japan
- Language: Japanese
- Box office: US$3.3 million

Evil Does Not Exist (Japanese: 悪は存在しない, Hepburn: Aku wa Sonzai Shinai) is a 2023 Japanese drama film written and directed by Ryusuke Hamaguchi. With a cast of non-professional actors, the film follows a single father who lives in a village that is disrupted by a real estate project and the consequences its development will have for their environment.

The film was selected to compete for the Golden Lion at the 80th Venice International Film Festival, where it won the Grand Jury Prize and the FIPRESCI Award from the International Federation of Film Critics. It was awarded Best Film at the 2023 BFI London Film Festival.

== Plot ==
Extensive winter forest scenery opens the film. Widower Takumi lives with his eight-year-old daughter Hana in the peaceful Japanese mountain village of Mizubiki. He chops wood, smokes a cigarette, collects jugs of water from the forest stream, and occasionally hears gunshots, presumably from deer hunters.

In a community meeting, residents are confronted with a proposal to develop a glamping site. Takahashi and Mayuzumi, two developer representatives, introduce the project. However, the townsfolk unanimously voice their serious concerns about the consequences the site will have for their delicate water systems and scoff at the representatives' public relations tactics. Takumi and others tell them that the capacity of the septic tank is not large enough for the planned development and that sewage will leak into the groundwater that they tap from wells. The company is accused of caring only about profits and of wanting to move recklessly fast in order to take advantage of limited-time pandemic subsidies.

Takahashi and Mayuzumi change their attitudes as they listen, but after reporting the outcome of the meeting to their boss, they are rebuffed and told to not change the septic system but, instead, to seduce Takumi with gifts and hire him as a caretaker for the camp. The pair drive back to the village as they chat about their online dating experiences and their disillusionment with their jobs. They chop wood and have lunch with Takumi. Takahashi decides to stay in the village to live there and learn all he can from Takumi. On a drive, Takumi mentions that while wild deer are normally not aggressive, a gut-shot deer or its parent may attack if it is unable to run away. Another gunshot is heard in the distance.

Takumi's daughter Hana goes missing and the village community searches into the night for her. Takumi and Takahashi venture into the forest looking for her and eventually emerge into an open field. Hana is shown in the field approaching a deer and her calf, the latter of which has been gut-shot. Before Takahashi can run over, Takumi tackles him to the ground and chokes him unconscious. Hana is seen lying motionless in the field with a bloody nose before Takumi picks her up and runs off into the forest. Takahashi comes to, struggles to get up only to fall down again. The sound of footsteps and labored breathing are heard faintly over a visual of the forest as it fades to darkness.

== Cast ==
- Hitoshi Omika as Takumi Yasumura, an "odd job man" in Mizubiki
- Ryo Nishikawa as Hana Yasumura, Takumi's daughter
- Ryuji Kosaka as Takahashi Keisuke, a male talent agency representative
- Ayaka Shibutani as Mayuzumi Yuuko, a female talent agency representative
- Hazuki Kikuchi as Sachi Minemura, Kazuo's wife and the co-owner of Mizubiki's local restaurant
- Hiroyuki Miura as Kazuo Minemura, Takumi's friend and the owner of Mizubiki's local restaurant
- Yûto Torii as Tatsuki Sakamoto
- Takako Yamamura as Yoshiko Kizaki
- Takuma Nagao as Tomonori Hasegawa
- Yoshinori Miyata as Akira Horiguchi, Takahashi and Mayuzumi's boss
- Taijirô Tamura as Ippei Suruga, the mayor of Mizubiki

== Production ==
=== Development ===
Hamaguchi started working on the film two years before its release; the project began when he was shooting a 30-minute short film accompanied by a live score composed by Eiko Ishibashi. However, Hamaguchi decided to turn it into a feature film with dialogue.

Hamaguchi was influenced by the work of Jean-Luc Godard, who had recently died. He and Ishibashi bonded over the "common language" they found in Godard, whose work they admired for its musical qualities. Hamaguchi said, "In some ways, it was a dimension that we had really set ourselves towards. I was thinking about how he used sound and images together. There are also some visual references to some of his work. That all said, fortunately or unfortunately, I think ultimately Evil Does Not Exist is a very different kind of film from the ones Godard made." The typography in the opening credits is reminiscent of Godard's work, a decision Hamaguchi made in the editing process.

The fictional town in the film as a composite of several villages Hamaguchi visited during an extensive research period for gathering ideas for the script. He attributes this research to his ability to write the script quickly in about a week. Production lasted from November 2022 to "around the start of 2023."

=== Filming ===
Evil Does Not Exist was filmed in the border regions between Yamanashi and Nagano prefectures. The film was shot by Yoshio Kitagawa and graded by Ryota Kobayashi. Kitagawa utilized a Blackmagic Pocket Cinema Camera 6K G2 with older lenses by Nikon that introduced some graininess that Kobayashi found pleasant. Shots were illuminated primarily by natural light, which helped simulate the desired look of Kodak Portra 400 film.

=== Soundtrack ===
Evil Does Not Exist

Soundtrack album by Eiko Ishibashi
- Released: 28 June 2024
- Length: 43:46
- Label: Drag City

The soundtrack was released on 28 June 2024 through Drag City. It was mixed and mastered by Ishibashi's partner Jim O'Rourke, who also plays guitar on the soundtrack.

No.	Title	Length
1.	"Evil Does Not Exist V.2"	5:59
2.	"Hana V.2"	7:33
3.	"Fether"	2:25
4.	"Smoke"	4:30
5.	"Deer Blood"	5:48
6.	"Missing V.2"	12:04
7.	"Evil Does Not Exist"	5:26
Total length:		43:46

== Release ==
In July 2023, it was announced that Hamaguchi had two new films scheduled for world premieres at the fall festival season: Evil Does Not Exist and Gift; with the latter being the originally-intended version without dialogue with Ishibashi's live score and which had its world premiere at Belgium's Film Fest Gent in October 2023. Evil Does Not Exist premiered on 4 September 2023 at the 80th Venice International Film Festival, where it was selected in the main competition for the Golden Lion and was ultimately awarded the Grand Jury Prize.

It was also screened at the 2023 Toronto International Film Festival, the 2023 New York Film Festival and the 2023 BFI London Film Festival, where it was awarded Best Film in Official Competition. It was also invited at the 28th Busan International Film Festival in the 'Icon' section and was screened on 7 October 2023.

The film had its Japanese premiere at the Hiroshima International Film Festival on 26 November 2023. It was released in cinemas in Australia on 18 April 2024.

It was theatrically released in Japan on 26 April 2024, distributed by Incline. It was released in the UK & Ireland on 5 April 2024 by Modern Films, and in the US on 3 May 2024 by Sideshow/Janus Films and Canada on 10 May 2024 by Films We Like.

== Reception ==
=== Critical response ===
On the review aggregator website Rotten Tomatoes, 91% of 163 critics' reviews are positive. The website's consensus reads: "Evil Does Not Exist stands on the battle lines between modern civilization and the natural world, offering a perspective that's as quietly measured as it is entrancing." Metacritic, which uses a weighted average, assigned the film a score of 83 out of 100, based on 40 critics, indicating "universal acclaim".

In a review for The New York Times, film critic Manohla Dargis wrote that the film is "visually unadorned, simple, direct" and that Hamaguchi "uses fragments from everyday life to build a world that is so intimate and recognizable...that the movie's artistry almost comes as a shock."

Peter Bradshaw of The Guardian gave the film four out of five stars, writing that "Hamaguchi's quietist, enigmatic eco-parable refuses easy explanations and perhaps it refuses difficult explanations as well" and that "it is arguably opaque and contrived, and will possibly exasperate as many as it intrigues." Bradshaw questioned some of the "compositional quirks" in the film and concluded that the film wasn't Hamaguchi's best work but that it is "presented with such calm assurance and artistry that it compels a kind of wistful, if uncomprehending, assent."

=== Accolades ===
Award	Date of ceremony	Category	Recipient(s)	Result	Ref.
Asia Pacific Screen Awards	3 November 2023	Best Film	Evil Does Not Exist	Nominated	
Asia Pacific Screen Awards	3 November 2023	Jury Grand Prize	Evil Does Not Exist	Won	
Asia Pacific Screen Awards	3 November 2023	Best Director	Ryusuke Hamaguchi	Nominated	
Asia Pacific Screen Awards	3 November 2023	Best Screenplay	Ryusuke Hamaguchi	Nominated	
Asia Pacific Screen Awards	3 November 2023	Best Cinematography	Yoshio Kitagawa	Nominated	
Asian Film Awards	10 March 2024	Best Film	Evil Does Not Exist	Won	
Asian Film Awards	10 March 2024	Best Director	Ryusuke Hamaguchi	Nominated	
Asian Film Awards	10 March 2024	Best Screenplay	Ryusuke Hamaguchi	Nominated	
Asian Film Awards	10 March 2024	Best Editing	Ryusuke Hamaguchi, Azusa Yamazaki	Nominated	
Asian Film Awards	10 March 2024	Best Cinematography	Yoshio Kitagawa	Nominated	
Asian Film Awards	10 March 2024	Best Original Music	Eiko Ishibashi	Won	
BFI London Film Festival	15 October 2023	Best Film	Evil Does Not Exist	Won	
Chicago International Film Festival	22 October 2023	Gold Hugo	Evil Does Not Exist	Nominated	
Florida Film Critics Circle	20 December 2024	Best Original Screenplay	Ryusuke Hamaguchi	Nominated	
Gotham Awards	2 December 2024	Best Screenplay	Ryusuke Hamaguchi	Nominated	
IndieWire Critics Poll	11 December 2023	Best Films Opening in 2024	Evil Does Not Exist	4th Place	
International Film Festival of Kerala	15 December 2023	Suvarna Chakoram for Best Film	Evil Does Not Exist	Won	
Los Angeles Film Critics Association	8 December 2024	Best Music Score	Eiko Ishibashi	Runner-up	
Miskolc International Film Festival	14 September 2024	Emeric Pressburger Prize	Evil Does Not Exist	Nominated	
Montclair Film Festival	29 October 2023	Fiction Feature	Evil Does Not Exist	Nominated	
San Sebastián International Film Festival	30 September 2023	Lurra - Greenpeace Award	Evil Does Not Exist	Won	
Seattle Film Critics Society	16 December 2024	Best International Film	Evil Does Not Exist	Won	
Seattle Film Critics Society	16 December 2024	Best Original Score	Eiko Ishibashi	Nominated	
Toronto Film Critics Association	15 December 2024	Best International Film	Evil Does Not Exist	Runner-up	
Venice Film Festival	9 September 2023	Golden Lion	Ryusuke Hamaguchi	Nominated	
Venice Film Festival	9 September 2023	Grand Jury Prize	Ryusuke Hamaguchi	Won	
Venice Film Festival	9 September 2023	Premio CinemaSarà - Special Mention	Ryusuke Hamaguchi	Won	
Venice Film Festival	9 September 2023	Edipo Re Award - Ca'Foscari Young Jury Award	Ryusuke Hamaguchi	Won	
Venice Film Festival	9 September 2023	Premio Fondazione Fai Persona Lavoro Ambiente	Ryusuke Hamaguchi	Won	
Venice Film Festival	9 September 2023	FIPRESCI Award	Ryusuke Hamaguchi	Won	
