= Jim O'Rourke (musician) =

American musician (born 1969)

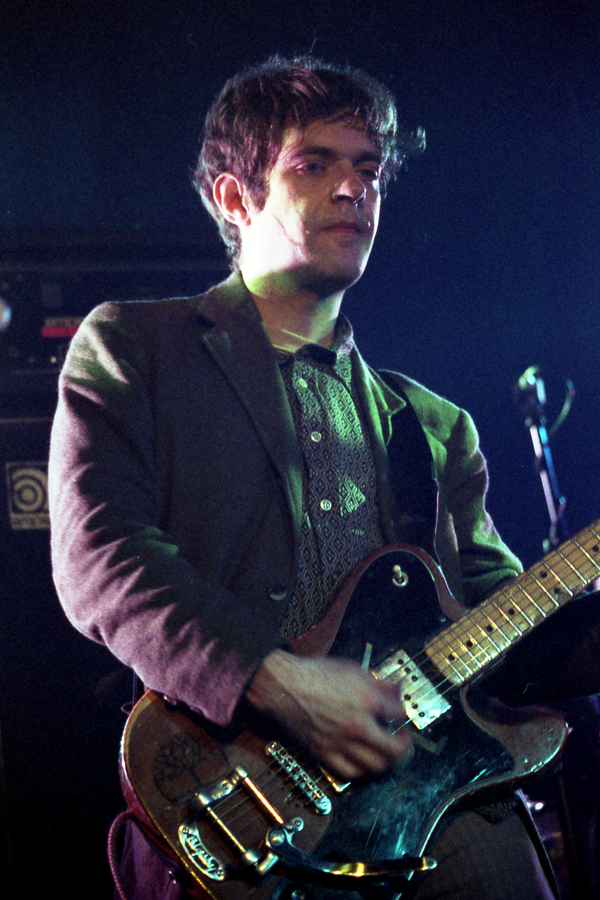
- O'Rourke performing with Sonic Youth in 2004

Background information
- Born: January 18, 1969 (age 57); Chicago, Illinois, U.S
- Occupations: Musician; instrumentalist; composer; singer-songwriter; record producer
- Instruments: Guitar; synthesizer; piano; bass guitar; hurdy-gurdy; vocals
- Years active: 1989–present
- Labels: Domino; Drag City; Tzadik
- Formerly of: Brise-Glace; Fenn O'Berg; Gastr del Sol; Loose Fur; Sonic Youth

James O'Rourke (born January 18, 1969) is an American musician, instrumentalist, composer, singer-songwriter and record producer. He is best known for his numerous solo and collaborative music projects, many of which are instrumental, and has been acclaimed for his music that spans varied genres, including avant-garde styles such as ambient, noise and minimalism, and styles of rock like indie rock and post-rock. He has been associated with the Chicago experimental and improv scene, as well as with New York City when he relocated there in 2000 for his tenure as a member of American indie rock band Sonic Youth. He subsequently moved to Japan and has since become a Japanese resident.

O'Rourke received a 2001 Foundation for Contemporary Arts Grants to Artists Award. Since 2013, O'Rourke has used his Steamroom Bandcamp page to release reissues of rare and older material, as well as original newer pieces.

== Biography ==
O'Rourke was born on January 18, 1969, in Chicago, Illinois. He is an alumnus of DePaul University.

O'Rourke has collaborated with Thurston Moore, Lee Ranaldo, Kim Gordon, Steve Shelley, Derek Bailey, Mats Gustafsson, Mayo Thompson, Brigitte Fontaine, Loren Mazzacane Connors, Merzbow, Nurse with Wound, Phill Niblock, Fennesz, Organum, Phew, Henry Kaiser and Flying Saucer Attack. He has produced and instrumentally contributed to albums by artists such as Sonic Youth, Wilco, Stereolab, Superchunk, Kahimi Karie, Quruli, John Fahey, Smog, Faust, Tony Conrad, Red Krayola, Bobby Conn, Beth Orton, and U.S. Maple.

He mixed and produced Wilco's Yankee Hotel Foxtrot album and produced their 2004 album, A Ghost Is Born, for which he won a Grammy Award for "Best Alternative Album". Parallel to the recording of Yankee Hotel Foxtrot, O'Rourke collaborated with Jeff Tweedy and Glenn Kotche under the name Loose Fur. Their self-titled debut was released in 2003 with a follow-up in 2006 entitled Born Again in the USA. He also mixed the unfinished recordings that made up a planned third album by the late American singer-songwriter Judee Sill, recorded in 1974 and mixed by O'Rourke for a 2005 release. In 2006, O'Rourke mixed Joanna Newsom's album Ys, and in 2009, he also mixed several tracks on Newsom's follow up Have One On Me.

O'Rourke has previously been a member of Illusion of Safety, Brise-Glace with Darin Gray and Dylan Posa, Gastr del Sol with David Grubbs, Fenn O'Berg with Christian Fennesz and Peter Rehberg, and Sonic Youth. Beginning in 1999 he played bass guitar, guitar and synthesizer with Sonic Youth, in addition to recording and mixing duties with the group. He withdrew as a full member in late 2005, but continued to play with them in some of their side projects.

O'Rourke has also released many albums under his own name on a variety of labels, exploring a range of electronic and avant-garde styles. His most well-known works may be his series of releases on Drag City, which focus on more traditional song craft: Bad Timing (1997), Eureka (1999), Insignificance (2001), The Visitor (2009) and Simple Songs (2015). The titles of the first four albums all refer to films by the British director Nicolas Roeg; the first three by direct reference to film titles, the fourth being titled after a fictional album within Roeg's film The Man Who Fell to Earth.

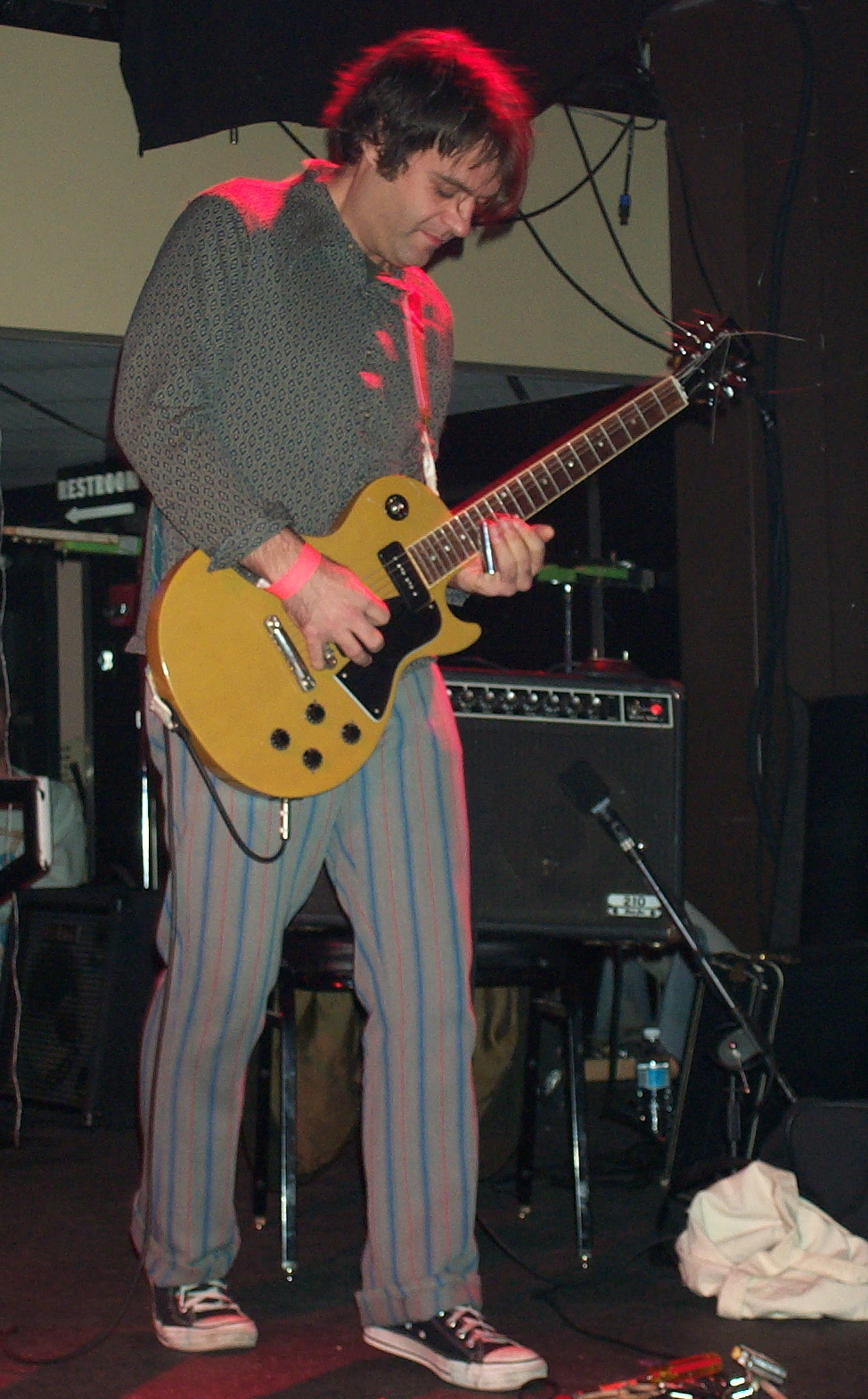
O'Rourke performing in Minneapolis, 2003

With music director Takehisa Kosugi, he played for the Merce Cunningham dance company for four years. He was a guitarist for the 1999 premiere of Cunningham's ballet Biped with Gavin Bryars in Berkeley, California. With Loren Connors, O'Rourke has released two collaborative albums: In Bern (1999) and Two Nice Catholic Boys (2009). With Oren Ambarchi, O'Rourke has released three collaborative albums: Indeed (2011), Behold (2015), and Hence (2018). In 2016, he released a collaborative album with Christian Fennesz, titled It's Hard for Me to Say I'm Sorry.

O'Rourke is currently in a relationship with Japanese musician Eiko Ishibashi, with whom he frequently collaborates. The two met when Ishibashi played flute on an album of Burt Bacharach covers that O'Rourke was producing. They live and work closely together, but "keep a professional distance, sending each other data files to work on rather than jamming." In 2025, they released a collaborative album, Pareidolia. In 2024, O'Rourke contributed to the soundtrack of AS Velasca, a Gesamtkunstwerk football club created by Wolfgang Natlacen by composing the Theme for it.

Since May 2020, O'Rourke has worked with the Roland Kayn estate releasing a restored and mastered Kayn cybernetic music recording every month on the digital distribution platform Bandcamp. At the current rate, they estimate that it will take 20 years for Kayn's complete catalog to be released.

== Work in films ==
- O'Rourke's song "Happy Days" was featured in the 1999 Harmony Korine film Julien Donkey-Boy.
- O'Rourke's first work in film scoring came when he was hired to work on the 2002 film Love Liza, directed by Todd Louiso.
- O'Rourke worked as a music consultant for the 2003 film School of Rock, in which he taught the child actors in the movie how to play the songs.
  - While on set, O'Rourke also served as a reverse vocal coach of sorts, teaching Miranda Cosgrove how to intentionally sing badly as her character of Summer was meant to be tone deaf.
  - O'Rourke was supposed to have a cameo role in the film, but the part was scrapped due to his touring commitments with Sonic Youth.
- O'Rourke scored the 2004 video installation "Fireball", and did the sound design on the documentary Red Orchestra by Stefan Roloff.
- O'Rourke's own short films were part of the 2004 and 2006 Whitney Biennial, as well as the 2005 Rotterdam Film Festival.
- O'Rourke scored Kōji Wakamatsu's film United Red Army in 2007.
- O'Rourke scored Kyle Armstrong's 2012 documentary film Magnetic Reconnection, which was narrated by fellow American musician Will Oldham.
- O'Rourke scored the 2014 British film The Creeping Garden.
- O'Rourke produced and played on the soundtrack for Ryusuke Hamaguchi's 2021 film Drive My Car, composed by Eiko Ishibashi.
  - O'Rourke then collaborated with Hamaguchi and Ishibashi again when he mixed, mastered and played guitar on the soundtrack for Hamaguchi's next film, 2023's Evil Does Not Exist.
- O'Rourke's music is prevalently featured in Shinji Aoyama's 2000 film Eureka, with director Aoyama stating that the film was named after O'Rourke's album.

== Selected discography ==
=== Solo ===
- Some Kind of Pagan (Sound of Pig, 1989)
- It Takes Time to Do Nothing (Audiofile Tapes, 1990)
- Secure on the Loose Rim (Sound of Pig, 1991)
- The Ground Below Above Our Heads (Entenpfuhl, 1991)
- Tamper (Extreme Records, 1991)
- Disengage (Staalplaat, 1992)
- Scend (Divided Records, 1992)
- Remove the Need (Extreme Records, 1993)
- Rules of Reduction (Metamkine, 1993)
- When in Vanitas... (Skin Graft, 1994)
- Terminal Pharmacy (Tzadik Records, 1995)
- Happy Days (Revenant Records, 1997)
- Bad Timing (Drag City, 1997)
- Eureka (Drag City, 1999)
- Halfway to a Threeway EP (Drag City, 1999)
- Insignificance (Drag City, 2001)
- I'm Happy and I'm Singing and a 1, 2, 3, 4 (Mego, 2001)
- Mizu No Nai Umi (vector7/HEADZ54, 2005)
- Corona / Tokyo Realization (Columbia Music Entertainment, 2006) – Japan only release. Dedicated to Tōru Takemitsu
- The Visitor (Drag City, 2009) – Dedicated to Derek Bailey.
- All Kinds of People ~ Love Burt Bacharach (AWDR, 2010)
- Old News #5 (Mego, 2011)
- Old News #6 (Mego, Aug 2011)
- Old News #7 (Mego, Feb 2012)
- Old News #8 (Mego, Sep 2012)
- Old News #9 (Mego, Oct 2012)
- Simple Songs (Drag City, 2015)
- Sleep Like It's Winter (Newhere Music, 2018)
- To Magnetize Money and Catch a Roving Eye (Sonoris, 2019)
- Shutting Down Here (Portraits GRM, 2020)
- Too Compliment (DDS, 2021)
- Hands That Bind (Original Motion Picture Soundtrack) (2023)

=== Collaborations ===
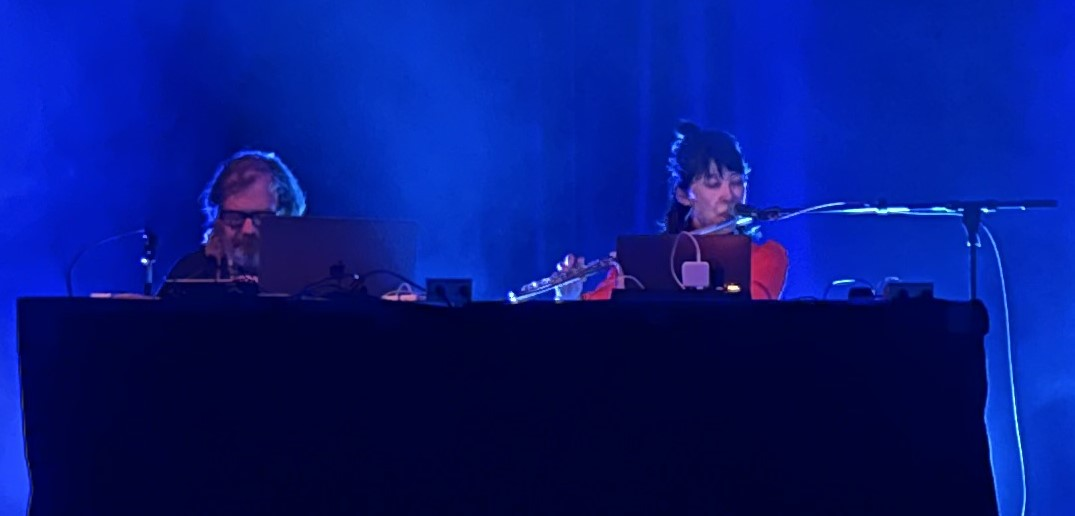
O'Rourke (left) performing with Eiko Ishibashi in 2023

- In Bern (with Loren Connors; Family Vineyard, 1999)
- Two Nice Catholic Boys (with Loren Connors; Family Vineyard, 2009)
- Indeed (with Oren Ambarchi; Editions Mego, 2011)
- Behold (with Oren Ambarchi; Editions Mego, 2015)
- Flying Basket (with Akira Sakata, Chikaramochi, and Merzbow; Family Vineyard, 2015)
- It's Hard for Me to Say I'm Sorry (with Christian Fennesz; Editions Mego, 2016)
- Hence (with Oren Ambarchi; Editions Mego, 2018)
- Pareidolia (with Eiko Ishibashi; Drag City, 2025)
