= Insignificance (Jim O'Rourke album) =

Studio album by Jim O'Rourke
- Released: November 19, 2001
- Genres: Indie rock; art rock; pop rock
- Length: 38:25
- Label: Drag City
- Producers: Jim O'Rourke, Jeremy Lemos, Konrad Strauss

Jim O'Rourke chronology
Halfway to a Threeway (1999)	Insignificance (2001)	I'm Happy and I'm Singing and a 1, 2, 3, 4 (2001)

Insignificance is the second singer-songwriter album by Jim O'Rourke, originally released on November 19, 2001, by Drag City. It is named after the Nicolas Roeg film of the same name. It peaked at number 35 on the UK Independent Albums Chart.

== Critical reception ==
Professional ratings
Aggregate scores
Source	Rating
Metacritic	81/100
Review scores
Source	Rating
AllMusic	4.5/5 stars
The Guardian	4/5 stars
NME	8/10
Pitchfork	8.0/10
Q	4/5 stars
Spin	7/10
Stylus Magazine	A−
Uncut	4/5 stars

At Metacritic, which assigns a weighted average score out of 100 to reviews from mainstream critics, the album received an average score of 81% based on 16 reviews, indicating "universal acclaim".

Pitchfork placed it at number 166 on their list of top 200 albums of the 2000s, and number 62 on its 2026 list of the 100 best indie rock albums of all-time.

== Track listing ==
All tracks are written by Jim O'Rourke.

No.	Title	Length
1.	"All Downhill from Here"	4:59
2.	"Insignificance"	5:12
3.	"Therefore, I Am"	4:53
4.	"Memory Lame"	5:57
5.	"Good Times"	4:04
6.	"Get a Room"	6:58
7.	"Life Goes Off"	6:22
Total length:		38:25

== Personnel ==
Credits adapted from liner notes.

- Jim O'Rourke
- Rob Mazurek – cornet (1, 4, 6)
- Ken Vandermark – saxophone (3)
- Jeff Tweedy – harmonica (1), guitar (3, 6)
- Ken Champion – pedal steel guitar (5, 7)
- Darin Gray – bass guitar (1, 3, 4, 6, 7)
- Glenn Kotche – drums (all tracks), vibraphone (5)
- Tim Barnes – drums (1, 3, 4, 6, 7)

== Charts ==
Chart (2002)	Peak position
UK Independent Albums (Official Charts)	35
