= List of accolades received by Drive My Car (film) =

Drive My Car accolades
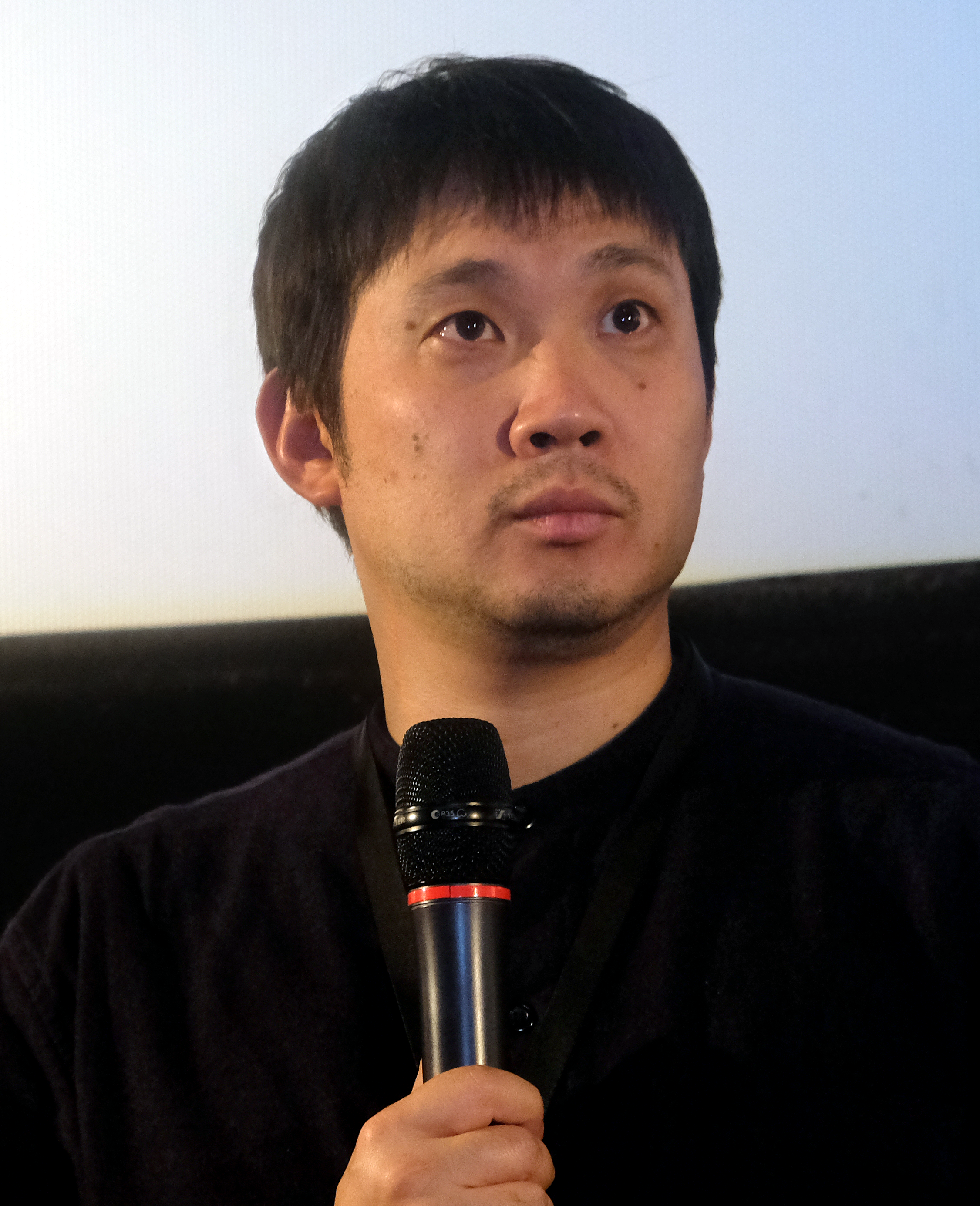
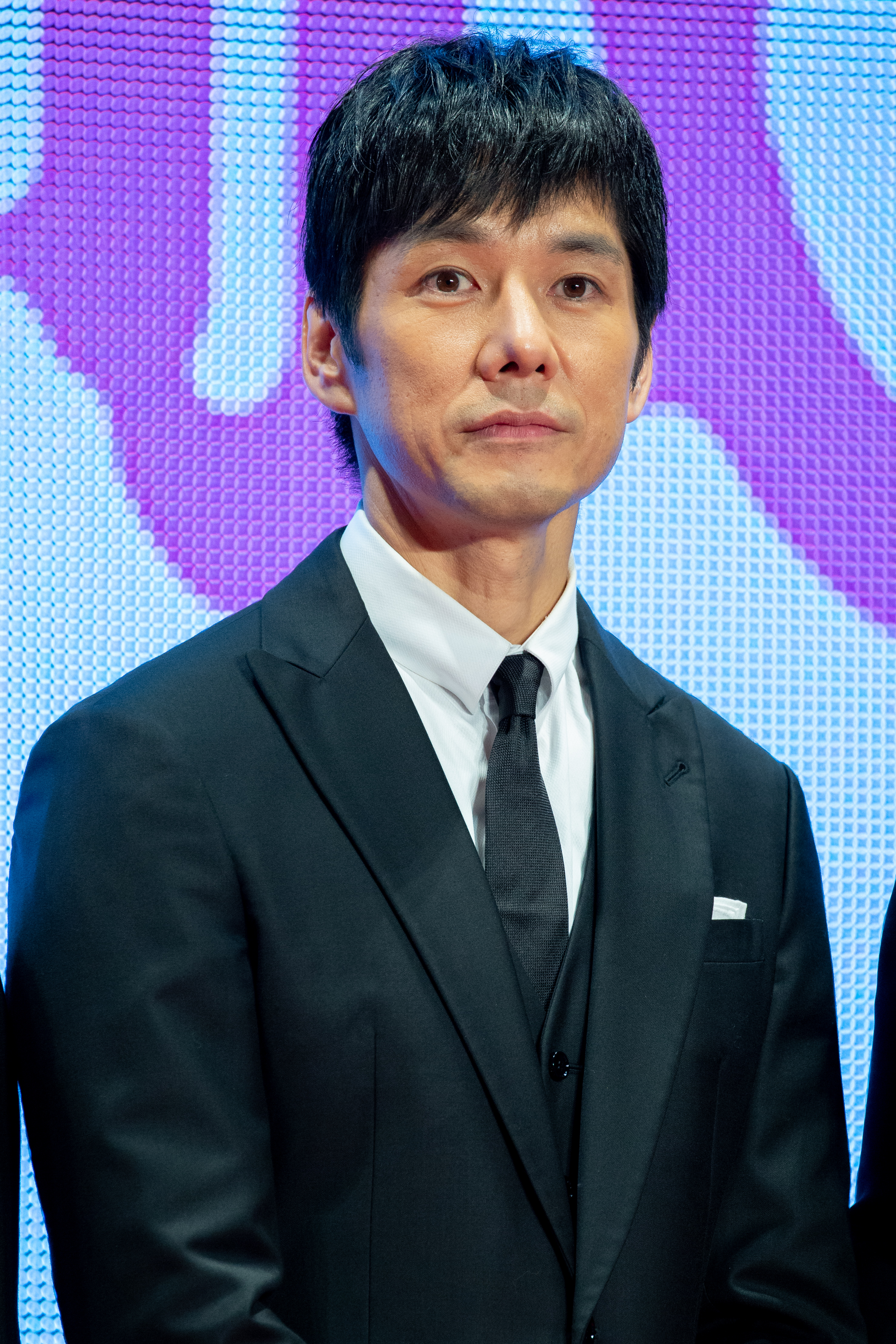
- Ryusuke Hamaguchi (left) and Hidetoshi Nishijima (right) received acclaim for their direction and performance, respectively.
Accolades
Award	Wins	Nominations
AACTA Awards	1	1
AARP Movies for Grownups Awards	0	1
Academy Awards	1	4
Alliance of Women Film Journalists	1	1
Asia Pacific Screen Awards	2	4
Asian Film Awards	3	8
Austin Film Critics Association	2	3
Belgian Film Critics Association	0	1
Blue Ribbon Awards	1	5
Bodil Awards	0	1
Boston Society of Film Critics	4	4
British Academy Film Awards	1	3
Cannes Film Festival	3	4
César Awards	0	1
Chicago Film Critics Association	1	6
Chicago International Film Festival	2	2
Chlotrudis Awards	0	2
Critics' Choice Awards	1	1
Dallas–Fort Worth Film Critics Association	1	1
David di Donatello	0	1
Denver Film Festival	1	1
Dorian Awards	1	4
Florida Film Critics Circle	1	1
Georgia Film Critics Association	1	2
Golden Globe Awards	1	1
Golden Trailer Awards	0	1
Gotham Independent Film Awards	1	1
Hochi Film Awards	0	4
Hollywood Critics Association	1	1
Houston Film Critics Society	1	1
Huading Awards	1	4
Independent Spirit Awards	1	1
IndieWire Critics Poll	5	5
International Cinephile Society	3	7
Japan Academy Film Prize	9	9
Japanese Movie Critics Awards	1	1
Kansas City Film Critics Circle	2	2
Kinema Junpo Awards	5	5
Location Managers Guild Awards	0	1
London Film Critics Circle	2	4
Los Angeles Film Critics Association	3	3
Mainichi Film Awards	2	10
National Society of Film Critics	4	4
New York Film Critics Circle	1	1
New York Film Critics Online	1	1
Nikkan Sports Film Award	2	2
Online Film Critics Society	1	5
Palm Springs International Film Festival	0	1
Paris Film Critics Awards	0	3
Robert Awards	0	1
San Diego Film Critics Society	0	1
San Francisco Bay Area Film Critics Circle	1	5
San Sebastián International Film Festival	1	1
Santa Barbara International Film Festival	1	1
Satellite Awards	1	1
Seattle Film Critics Society	4	5
St. Louis Film Critics Association	1	2
Toronto Film Critics Association	4	4
Turkish Film Critics Association	1	1
Washington D.C. Area Film Critics Association	1	1
Women Film Critics Circle	1	1
World Soundtrack Awards	1	1
Yokohama Film Festival	2	2

Totals (Note: Certain award groups do not simply award one winner. They acknowledge several different recipients, have runners-up, and have third place. Since this is a specific recognition and is different from losing an award, runner-up mentions are considered wins in this award tally. For simplification and to avoid errors, each award in this list has been presumed to have had a prior nomination.)
- Wins: 94
- Nominations: 167

Drive My Car (Japanese: ドライブ・マイ・カー, Hepburn: Doraibu Mai Kā) is a 2021 Japanese drama film directed by Ryusuke Hamaguchi and written by Hamaguchi and Takamasa Oe. It is based on the short story of the same name by Haruki Murakami from his 2014 collection, Men Without Women, while taking inspiration from "Scheherazade" and "Kino", two other stories from the collection. Starring Hidetoshi Nishijima, Tōko Miura, Masaki Okada, and Reika Kirishima, the film follows Yūsuke Kafuku (Nishijima) as he directs a production of Uncle Vanya, while still grieving over the death of his wife.

The film had its world premiere at the Cannes Film Festival on 11 July 2021, in competition for the Palme d'Or, and was released in Japan on 20 August. It grossed $15.3 million worldwide, including $8.6 million in Japan and $2.3 million in the United States and Canada. Rotten Tomatoes, a review aggregator surveyed 215 reviews and judged 97% to be positive.

Drive My Car received numerous awards and nominations, particularly for Hamaguchi's direction, Nishijima's performance, and the screenplay. Hamaguchi and Oe became the first Japanese writers to win Best Screenplay at the Cannes Film Festival, where the film also won the FIPRESCI Prize and the Prize of the Ecumenical Jury. At the 94th Academy Awards, the film was nominated for Best Picture, Best Director and Best Adapted Screenplay, and won Best International Feature Film. It was the first Japanese film to receive a Best Picture nomination. The film won nine awards at the 45th Japan Academy Film Prize, including Picture of the Year, Director of the Year, and Screenplay of the Year. It also garnered ten nominations at the 2022 Mainichi Film Awards, winning Best Film and Best Director.

== Accolades ==
Accolades received by Drive My Car
Award	Date of ceremony	Category	Recipient(s)	Result	Ref.
AACTA Awards	2 March 2022	Best Asian Film	Drive My Car	Won	
AARP Movies for Grownups Awards	18 March 2022	Best Foreign Film	Drive My Car	Nominated	
Academy Awards	27 March 2022	Best Picture	Teruhisa Yamamoto	Nominated	
Academy Awards	27 March 2022	Best Director	Ryusuke Hamaguchi	Nominated	
Academy Awards	27 March 2022	Best Adapted Screenplay	Ryusuke Hamaguchi and Takamasa Oe	Nominated	
Academy Awards	27 March 2022	Best International Feature Film	Japan	Won	
Alliance of Women Film Journalists	25 January 2022	Best Non-English-Language Film	Drive My Car	Won	
Asia Pacific Screen Awards	11 November 2021	Best Feature Film	Drive My Car	Won	
Asia Pacific Screen Awards	11 November 2021	Achievement in Directing	Ryusuke Hamaguchi	Nominated	
Asia Pacific Screen Awards	11 November 2021	Best Performance by an Actor	Hidetoshi Nishijima	Nominated	
Asia Pacific Screen Awards	11 November 2021	Best Screenplay	Ryusuke Hamaguchi and Takamasa Oe	Won	
Asian Film Awards	12 March 2023	Best Film	Drive My Car	Won	
Asian Film Awards	12 March 2023	Best Director	Ryusuke Hamaguchi	Nominated	
Asian Film Awards	12 March 2023	Best Actor	Hidetoshi Nishijima	Nominated	
Asian Film Awards	12 March 2023	Best Supporting Actor	Masaki Okada	Nominated	
Asian Film Awards	12 March 2023	Best Screenplay	Ryusuke Hamaguchi and Takamasa Oe	Nominated	
Asian Film Awards	12 March 2023	Best Editing	Azusa Yamazaki	Won	
Asian Film Awards	12 March 2023	Best Original Music	Eiko Ishibashi	Won	
Asian Film Awards	12 March 2023	Best Sound	Miki Nomura and Tatsuya Obo	Nominated	
Austin Film Critics Association	11 January 2022	Best Director	Ryusuke Hamaguchi	Nominated	
Austin Film Critics Association	11 January 2022	Best Adapted Screenplay	Ryusuke Hamaguchi and Takamasa Oe	Won	
Austin Film Critics Association	11 January 2022	Best International Film	Drive My Car	Won	
Belgian Film Critics Association	8 January 2023	Grand Prix	Drive My Car	Nominated	
Blue Ribbon Awards	23 February 2022	Best Film	Drive My Car	Nominated	
Blue Ribbon Awards	23 February 2022	Best Director	Ryusuke Hamaguchi	Nominated	
Blue Ribbon Awards	23 February 2022	Best Actor	Hidetoshi Nishijima	Nominated	
Blue Ribbon Awards	23 February 2022	Best Supporting Actor	Masaki Okada	Nominated	
Blue Ribbon Awards	23 February 2022	Best Supporting Actress	Tōko Miura	Won	
Bodil Awards	25 March 2023	Best Non-American Film	Drive My Car	Nominated	
Boston Society of Film Critics	12 December 2021	Best Picture	Drive My Car	Won	
Boston Society of Film Critics	12 December 2021	Best Director	Ryusuke Hamaguchi	Won	
Boston Society of Film Critics	12 December 2021	Best Actor	Hidetoshi Nishijima	Won	
Boston Society of Film Critics	12 December 2021	Best Screenplay	Ryusuke Hamaguchi and Takamasa Oe	Won	
British Academy Film Awards	13 March 2022	Best Director	Ryusuke Hamaguchi	Nominated	
British Academy Film Awards	13 March 2022	Best Adapted Screenplay	Ryusuke Hamaguchi and Takamasa Oe	Nominated	
British Academy Film Awards	13 March 2022	Best Film Not in the English Language	Ryusuke Hamaguchi and Teruhisa Yamamoto	Won	
Cannes Film Festival	17 July 2021	Palme d'Or	Drive My Car	Nominated	
Cannes Film Festival	17 July 2021	Best Screenplay	Ryusuke Hamaguchi and Takamasa Oe	Won	
Cannes Film Festival	17 July 2021	FIPRESCI Prize	Drive My Car	Won	
Cannes Film Festival	17 July 2021	Prize of the Ecumenical Jury	Drive My Car	Won	
César Awards	25 February 2022	Best Foreign Film	Drive My Car	Nominated	
Chicago Film Critics Association	15 December 2021	Best Film	Drive My Car	Nominated	
Chicago Film Critics Association	15 December 2021	Best Director	Ryusuke Hamaguchi	Nominated	
Chicago Film Critics Association	15 December 2021	Best Actor	Hidetoshi Nishijima	Nominated	
Chicago Film Critics Association	15 December 2021	Best Adapted Screenplay	Ryusuke Hamaguchi, Haruki Murakami, and Takamasa Oe	Nominated	
Chicago Film Critics Association	15 December 2021	Best Editing	Azusa Yamazaki	Nominated	
Chicago Film Critics Association	15 December 2021	Best Foreign Language Film	Drive My Car	Won	
Chicago International Film Festival	22 October 2021	Silver Hugo Jury Prize	Drive My Car	Won	
Chicago International Film Festival	26 October 2021	Audience Choice Award for International Feature	Drive My Car	Won	
Chlotrudis Awards	22 March 2023	Best Movie	Drive My Car	Nominated	
Chlotrudis Awards	22 March 2023	Best Adapted Screenplay	Ryusuke Hamaguchi and Takamasa Oe	Nominated	
Critics' Choice Awards	13 March 2022	Best Foreign Language Film	Drive My Car	Won	
Dallas–Fort Worth Film Critics Association	20 December 2021	Best Foreign Language Film	Drive My Car	Won	
David di Donatello	3 May 2022	Best Foreign Film	Drive My Car	Nominated	
Denver Film Festival	15 November 2021	Krzysztof Kieslowski Award for Best Feature Film	Drive My Car	Won	
Dorian Awards	17 March 2022	Best Film	Drive My Car	Nominated	
Dorian Awards	17 March 2022	Best Non-English Language Film	Drive My Car	Won	
Dorian Awards	17 March 2022	Best Director	Ryusuke Hamaguchi	Nominated	
Dorian Awards	17 March 2022	Best Screenplay	Ryusuke Hamaguchi and Takamasa Oe	Nominated	
Florida Film Critics Circle	21 December 2021	Best Foreign Language Film	Drive My Car	Runner-up	
Georgia Film Critics Association	14 January 2022	Best Foreign Language Film	Drive My Car	Won	
Georgia Film Critics Association	14 January 2022	Best Adapted Screenplay	Ryusuke Hamaguchi and Takamasa Oe	Nominated	
Golden Globe Awards	9 January 2022	Best Foreign Language Film	Drive My Car	Won	
Golden Trailer Awards	6 October 2022	Best Foreign Trailer	Drive My Car	Nominated	
Gotham Independent Film Awards	29 November 2021	Best International Feature	Drive My Car	Won	
Hochi Film Awards	16 December 2021	Best Picture	Drive My Car	Nominated	
Hochi Film Awards	16 December 2021	Best Director	Ryusuke Hamaguchi	Nominated	
Hochi Film Awards	16 December 2021	Best Actor	Hidetoshi Nishijima (Note: Also for What Did You Eat Yesterday? (2021))	Nominated	
Hochi Film Awards	16 December 2021	Best Supporting Actress	Tōko Miura	Nominated	
Hollywood Critics Association	28 February 2022	Best International Film	Drive My Car	Won	
Houston Film Critics Society	19 January 2022	Best Foreign Language Film	Drive My Car	Won	
Huading Awards	1 December 2022	Best Global Picture	Drive My Car	Nominated	
Huading Awards	1 December 2022	Best Global Director	Ryusuke Hamaguchi	Nominated	
Huading Awards	1 December 2022	Best Global Screenplay	Ryusuke Hamaguchi and Takamasa Oe	Won	
Huading Awards	1 December 2022	Best Global Actor in a Leading Role	Hidetoshi Nishijima	Nominated	
Independent Spirit Awards	6 March 2022	Best International Film	Drive My Car	Won	
IndieWire Critics Poll	13 December 2021	Best Film	Drive My Car	2nd place	
IndieWire Critics Poll	13 December 2021	Best Director	Ryusuke Hamaguchi	2nd place	
IndieWire Critics Poll	13 December 2021	Best Performance	Hidetoshi Nishijima	9th place	
IndieWire Critics Poll	13 December 2021	Best Screenplay	Drive My Car	Won	
IndieWire Critics Poll	13 December 2021	Best International Film	Drive My Car	Won	
International Cinephile Society	6 February 2022	Best Picture	Drive My Car	2nd place	
International Cinephile Society	6 February 2022	Best Director	Ryusuke Hamaguchi	Nominated	
International Cinephile Society	6 February 2022	Best Actor	Hidetoshi Nishijima	Nominated	
International Cinephile Society	6 February 2022	Best Supporting Actress	Tōko Miura	Nominated	
International Cinephile Society	6 February 2022	Best Supporting Actress	Park Yu-rim	Nominated	
International Cinephile Society	6 February 2022	Best Ensemble	The cast of Drive My Car	Runner-up	
International Cinephile Society	6 February 2022	Best Adapted Screenplay	Ryusuke Hamaguchi and Takamasa Oe	Won	
Japan Academy Film Prize	11 March 2022	Picture of the Year	Drive My Car	Won	
Japan Academy Film Prize	11 March 2022	Director of the Year	Ryusuke Hamaguchi	Won	
Japan Academy Film Prize	11 March 2022	Screenplay of the Year	Ryusuke Hamaguchi and Takamasa Oe	Won	
Japan Academy Film Prize	11 March 2022	Outstanding Performance by an Actor in a Leading Role	Hidetoshi Nishijima	Won	
Japan Academy Film Prize	11 March 2022	Outstanding Achievement in Cinematography	Hidetoshi Shinomiya	Won	
Japan Academy Film Prize	11 March 2022	Outstanding Achievement in Lighting Direction	Daiki Takai	Won	
Japan Academy Film Prize	11 March 2022	Outstanding Achievement in Sound Recording	Kadoaki Izuta and Miki Nomura	Won	
Japan Academy Film Prize	11 March 2022	Best Film Editing	Azusa Yamazaki	Won	
Japan Academy Film Prize	11 March 2022	Newcomer of the Year	Tōko Miura	Won	
Japanese Movie Critics Awards	30 May 2022	Best Supporting Actress	Tōko Miura	Won	
Kansas City Film Critics Circle	16 January 2022	Best Adapted Screenplay	Drive My Car	Runner-up	
Kansas City Film Critics Circle	16 January 2022	Best Foreign Film	Drive My Car	Won	
Kinema Junpo Awards	2 February 2022	Best Film of the Year	Drive My Car	Won	
Kinema Junpo Awards	2 February 2022	Best Director	Ryusuke Hamaguchi	Won	
Kinema Junpo Awards	2 February 2022	Best Screenplay	Ryusuke Hamaguchi and Takamasa Oe	Won	
Kinema Junpo Awards	2 February 2022	Best Supporting Actress	Tōko Miura	Won	
Kinema Junpo Awards	2 February 2022	Readers' Choice Award for Best Director	Ryusuke Hamaguchi	Won	
Location Managers Guild Awards	27 August 2022	Outstanding Locations in a Contemporary Film	Drive My Car	Nominated	
London Film Critics Circle	6 February 2022	Film of the Year	Drive My Car	Nominated	
London Film Critics Circle	6 February 2022	Director of the Year	Ryusuke Hamaguchi	Nominated	
London Film Critics Circle	6 February 2022	Screenwriter of the Year	Ryusuke Hamaguchi and Takamasa Oe	Won	
London Film Critics Circle	6 February 2022	Foreign Language Film of the Year	Drive My Car	Won	
Los Angeles Film Critics Association	18 December 2021	Best Film	Drive My Car	Won	
Los Angeles Film Critics Association	18 December 2021	Best Director	Ryusuke Hamaguchi	Runner-up	
Los Angeles Film Critics Association	18 December 2021	Best Screenplay	Ryusuke Hamaguchi and Takamasa Oe	Won	
Mainichi Film Awards	15 February 2022	Best Film	Drive My Car	Won	
Mainichi Film Awards	15 February 2022	Best Director	Ryusuke Hamaguchi	Won	
Mainichi Film Awards	15 February 2022	Best Actor	Hidetoshi Nishijima	Nominated	
Mainichi Film Awards	15 February 2022	Best Supporting Actor	Masaki Okada	Nominated	
Mainichi Film Awards	15 February 2022	Best Supporting Actress	Tōko Miura	Nominated	
Mainichi Film Awards	15 February 2022	Best Screenplay	Ryusuke Hamaguchi and Takamasa Oe	Nominated	
Mainichi Film Awards	15 February 2022	Best Cinematography	Hidetoshi Shinomiya	Nominated	
Mainichi Film Awards	15 February 2022	Best Art Direction	Hyeon-Seon Seo	Nominated	
Mainichi Film Awards	15 February 2022	Best Music	Eiko Ishibashi	Nominated	
Mainichi Film Awards	15 February 2022	Best Sound Recording	Kadoaki Izuta	Nominated	
National Society of Film Critics	8 January 2022	Best Film	Drive My Car	Won	
National Society of Film Critics	8 January 2022	Best Director	Ryusuke Hamaguchi (Note: Also for Wheel of Fortune and Fantasy (2021))	Won	
National Society of Film Critics	8 January 2022	Best Actor	Hidetoshi Nishijima	Won	
National Society of Film Critics	8 January 2022	Best Screenplay	Ryusuke Hamaguchi and Takamasa Oe	Won	
New York Film Critics Circle	3 December 2021	Best Film	Drive My Car	Won	
New York Film Critics Online	12 December 2021	Best Foreign Language Feature	Drive My Car	Won	
Nikkan Sports Film Award	28 December 2021	Best Film	Drive My Car	Won	
Nikkan Sports Film Award	28 December 2021	Best Actor	Hidetoshi Nishijima	Won	
Online Film Critics Society	24 January 2022	Best Picture	Drive My Car	Nominated	
Online Film Critics Society	24 January 2022	Best Director	Ryusuke Hamaguchi	Nominated	
Online Film Critics Society	24 January 2022	Best Actor	Hidetoshi Nishijima	Nominated	
Online Film Critics Society	24 January 2022	Best Adapted Screenplay	Ryusuke Hamaguchi and Takamasa Oe	Nominated	
Online Film Critics Society	24 January 2022	Best Film Not in the English Language	Drive My Car	Won	
Palm Springs International Film Festival	7 January 2022	Best Foreign Language Film	Drive My Car	Nominated	
Paris Film Critics Awards	7 February 2022	Best Picture	Drive My Car	Nominated	
Paris Film Critics Awards	7 February 2022	Best Supporting Actress	Tōko Miura	Nominated	
Paris Film Critics Awards	7 February 2022	Best Adapted Screenplay	Ryusuke Hamaguchi and Takamasa Oe	Nominated	
Robert Awards	4 February 2023	Best Non-English Language Film	Drive My Car	Nominated	
San Diego Film Critics Society	10 January 2022	Best Foreign Language Film	Drive My Car	Nominated	
San Francisco Bay Area Film Critics Circle	10 January 2022	Best Picture	Drive My Car	Nominated	
San Francisco Bay Area Film Critics Circle	10 January 2022	Best Director	Ryusuke Hamaguchi	Nominated	
San Francisco Bay Area Film Critics Circle	10 January 2022	Best Actor	Hidetoshi Nishijima	Nominated	
San Francisco Bay Area Film Critics Circle	10 January 2022	Best Adapted Screenplay	Ryusuke Hamaguchi and Takamasa Oe	Nominated	
San Francisco Bay Area Film Critics Circle	10 January 2022	Best Foreign Language Film	Drive My Car	Won	
San Sebastián International Film Festival	16 September 2022	FIPRESCI Grand Prix	Drive My Car	Won	
Santa Barbara International Film Festival	5 March 2022	Outstanding Directors of the Year	Ryusuke Hamaguchi	Won (Note: Shared with Paul Thomas Anderson for Licorice Pizza, Kenneth Branagh for Belfast, Jane Campion for The Power of the Dog, and Steven Spielberg for West Side Story)	
Satellite Awards	2 April 2022	Best Foreign Language Film	Drive My Car	Won	
Seattle Film Critics Society	17 January 2022	Best Picture	Drive My Car	Won	
Seattle Film Critics Society	17 January 2022	Best Director	Ryusuke Hamaguchi	Won	
Seattle Film Critics Society	17 January 2022	Best Screenplay	Ryusuke Hamaguchi and Takamasa Oe	Won	
Seattle Film Critics Society	17 January 2022	Best Film Editing	Azusa Yamazaki	Nominated	
Seattle Film Critics Society	17 January 2022	Best Film Not in the English Language	Drive My Car	Won	
St. Louis Film Critics Association	19 December 2021	Best Adapted Screenplay	Ryusuke Hamaguchi and Takamasa Oe	Nominated	
St. Louis Film Critics Association	19 December 2021	Best International Film	Drive My Car	Won	
Toronto Film Critics Association	16 January 2022	Best Film	Drive My Car	Won	
Toronto Film Critics Association	16 January 2022	Best Director	Ryusuke Hamaguchi	Runner-up	
Toronto Film Critics Association	16 January 2022	Best Screenplay	Ryusuke Hamaguchi and Takamasa Oe	Won	
Toronto Film Critics Association	16 January 2022	Best Foreign Language Film	Drive My Car	Won	
Turkish Film Critics Association	4 April 2023	Best Foreign Film Released in Theaters	Drive My Car	Won	
Washington D.C. Area Film Critics Association	6 December 2021	Best Foreign Language Film	Drive My Car	Won	
Women Film Critics Circle	11 December 2021	Best Foreign Film by or About Women	Drive My Car	Runner-up	
World Soundtrack Awards	22 October 2022	Discovery of the Year	Eiko Ishibashi	Won	
Yokohama Film Festival	6 February 2022	Best Film	Drive My Car	3rd place	
Yokohama Film Festival	6 February 2022	Best Supporting Actress	Tōko Miura	Won (Note: Shared with Yuki Katayama for A Madder Red)	
