= 2021 National Society of Film Critics Awards =

Annual US film awards ceremony

56th NSFC Awards
- Date: 8 January 2022

Highlights
- Best Picture: Drive My Car

The 56th National Society of Film Critics Awards, given on 8 January 2022, honored the best in film for 2021.

Japanese film Drive My Car won the most awards with four, including Best Film and Best Director (Ryusuke Hamaguchi).

== Winners ==
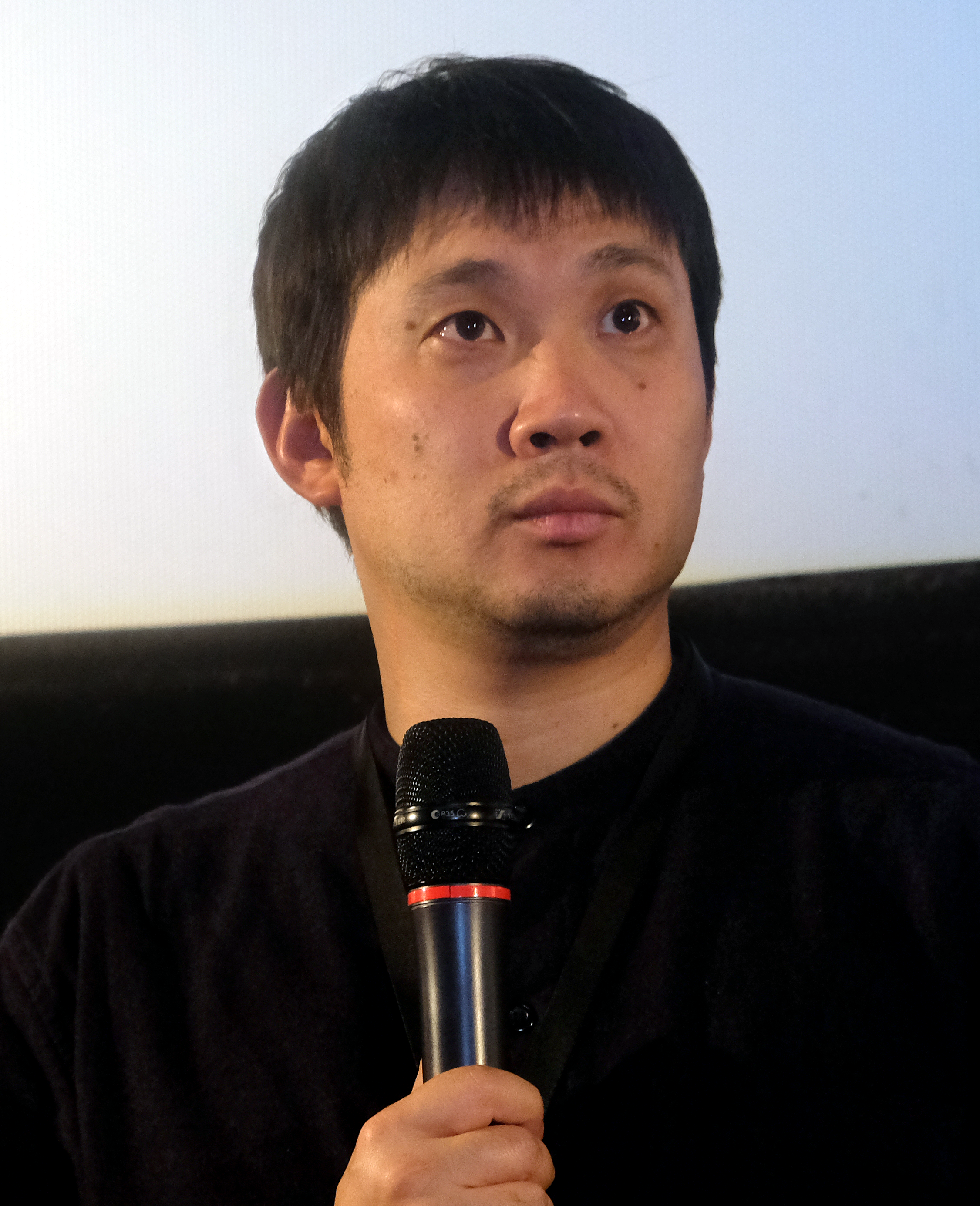
Ryusuke Hamaguchi, Best Director winner and Best Screenplay co-winner

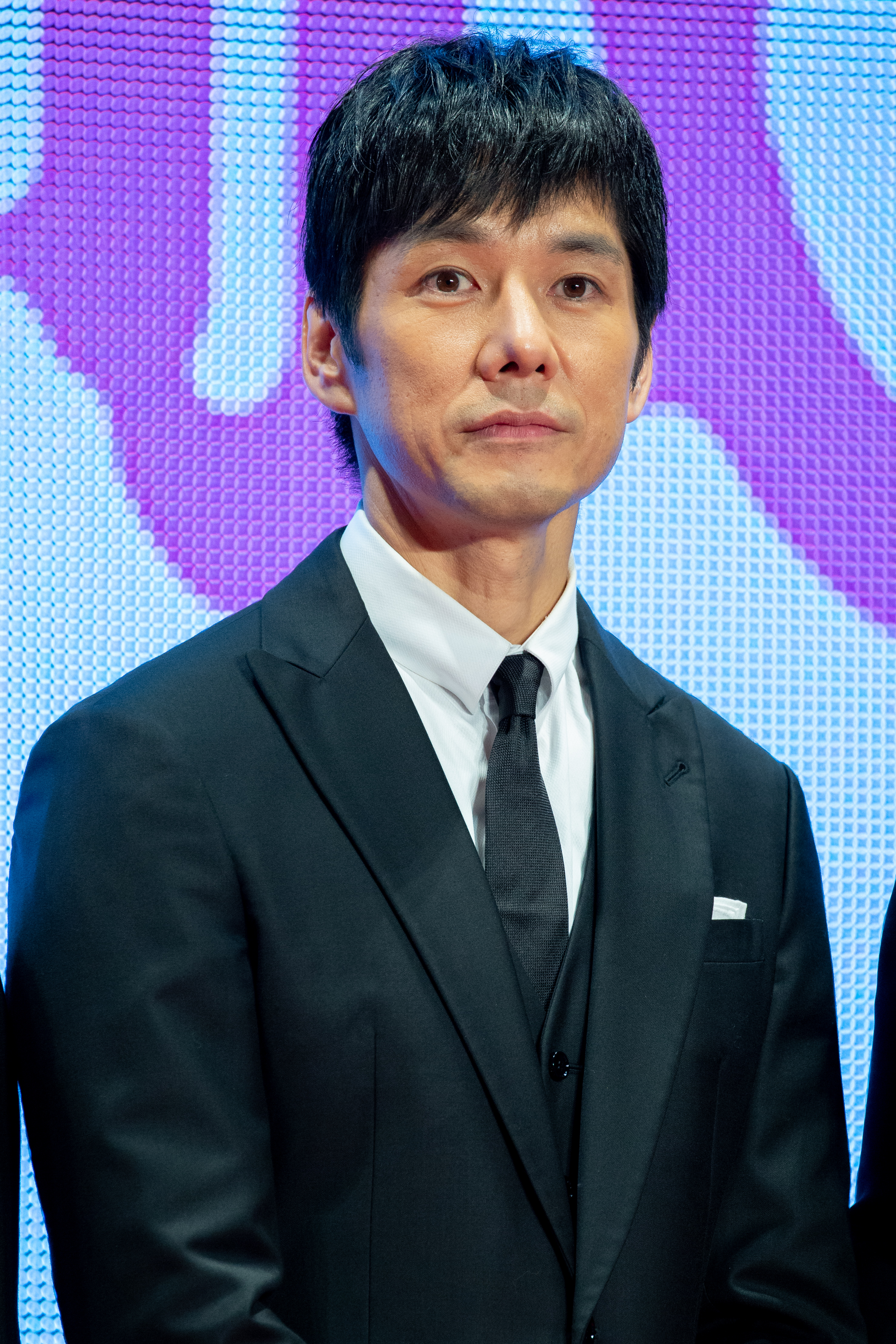
Hidetoshi Nishijima, Best Actor winner

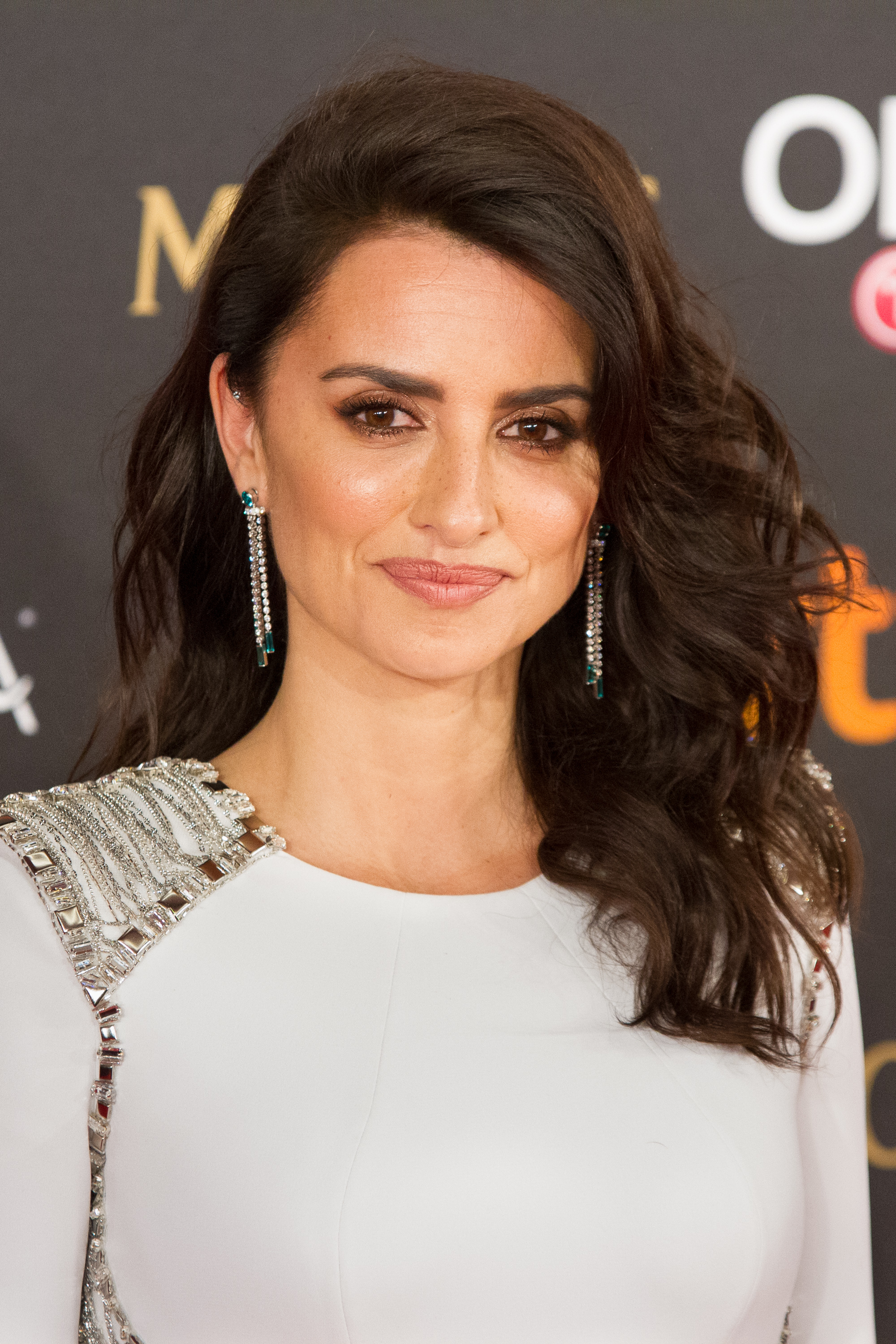
Penélope Cruz, Best Actress winner

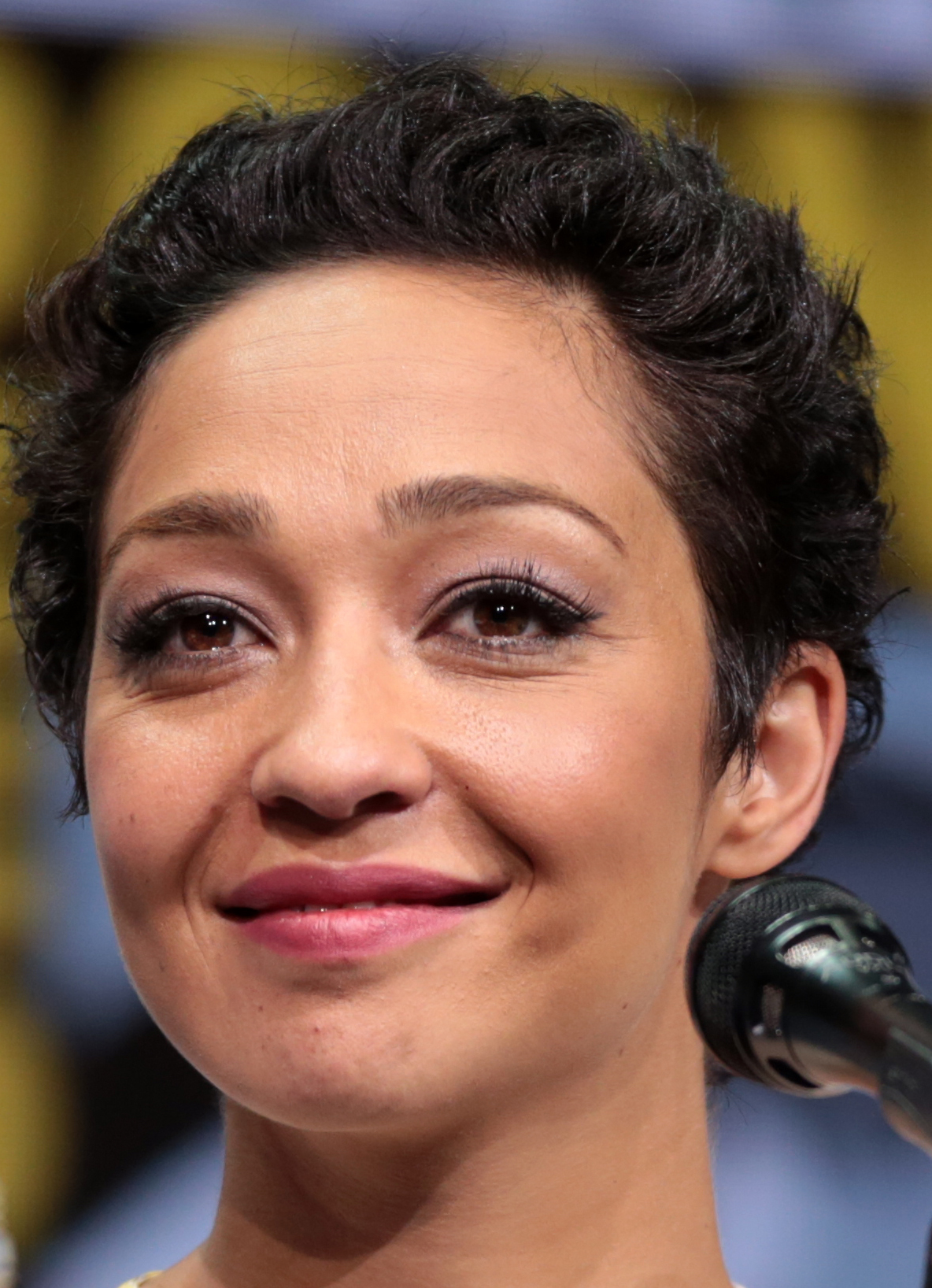
Ruth Negga, Best Supporting Actress winner

Winners are listed in boldface along with the runner-up positions and counts from the final round:

=== Best Picture ===
1. **Drive My Car** (48)
2. Petite Maman (25)
3. The Power of the Dog (23)

=== Best Director ===
1. **Ryusuke Hamaguchi – Drive My Car and Wheel of Fortune and Fantasy** (46)
2. Jane Campion – The Power of the Dog (36)
3. Céline Sciamma – Petite Maman (28)

=== Best Actor ===
1. **Hidetoshi Nishijima – Drive My Car** (63)
2. Benedict Cumberbatch – The Power of the Dog (44)
3. Simon Rex – Red Rocket (30)

=== Best Actress ===
1. **Penélope Cruz – Parallel Mothers** (55)
2. Renate Reinsve – The Worst Person in the World (42)
3. Alana Haim – Licorice Pizza (32)

=== Best Supporting Actor ===
1. **Anders Danielsen Lie – The Worst Person in the World** (54)
2. Vincent Lindon – Titane (33)
3. Mike Faist – West Side Story / Kodi Smit-McPhee – The Power of the Dog (26) **(TIE)**

=== Best Supporting Actress ===
1. **Ruth Negga – Passing** (46)
2. Ariana DeBose – West Side Story (22)
3. Jessie Buckley – The Lost Daughter (21)

=== Best Screenplay ===
1. **Ryusuke Hamaguchi and Takamasa Oe – Drive My Car** (46)
2. Pedro Almodóvar – Parallel Mothers (22)
3. Paul Thomas Anderson – Licorice Pizza (20)

=== Best Cinematography ===
1. **Andrew Droz Palermo – The Green Knight** (52)
2. Ari Wegner – The Power of the Dog (40)
3. Sayombhu Mukdeeprom – Memoria (35)

=== Best Foreign Language Film ===
Not awarded because the year's Best Picture was a foreign language film: Drive My Car (Japan)

=== Best Non-Fiction Film ===
1. **Flee** (41)
2. Procession / The Velvet Underground (28) **(TIE)**

=== Film Heritage Award ===
- Maya Cade for founding the Black Film Archive, which expands knowledge of and access to Black films made between 1915 and 1979, and includes her critical essays that define the project and consider the films in relation to each other and to the cinema overall.
- The late Peter Bogdanovich and Bertrand Tavernier, distinguished critic-filmmakers who never lost their passion for other people's movies and film history. Both crowned their careers with invaluable chronicles of their engagement with the cinema: Tavernier with the documentary My Journey Through French Cinema, and the books "50 Years of American Cinema" and "American Friends". Bogdanovich with the books "Who the Devil Made It" and "Who the Hell's in It".

=== Special Citation for a Film Awaiting U.S. Distribution ===
- Jean-Gabriel Périot's documentary Returning to Reims, which draws on Didier Eribon's 2009 memoir about his French hometown, and the inequities of class and education that shaped him and his family.

== Dedication ==
This year's awards were dedicated to the memory of two longtime members who died: Morris Dickstein and Michael Wilmington. Dickstein brought warmth, enthusiasm and prodigious analytic skills as a literary critic and cultural historian to writing about movies in journals like Dissent and Partisan Review, and in books like "Dancing in the Dark: A Cultural History of the Great Depression". Wilmington wrote beautifully and passionately about cinema as a critic for many publications, including the Chicago Tribune and Los Angeles Times, and co-authored the critical study "John Ford". The awards were also dedicated to Liz Weis, who stepped down after serving 47 years as executive director of the National Society of Film Critics.
