= 2021 Los Angeles Film Critics Association Awards =

Annual US film awards ceremony

47th LAFCA Awards
- Date: December 18, 2021

Highlights
- Best Picture: Drive My Car

The 47th Los Angeles Film Critics Association Awards, given by the Los Angeles Film Critics Association (LAFCA), honored the best in film for 2021.

== Winners ==
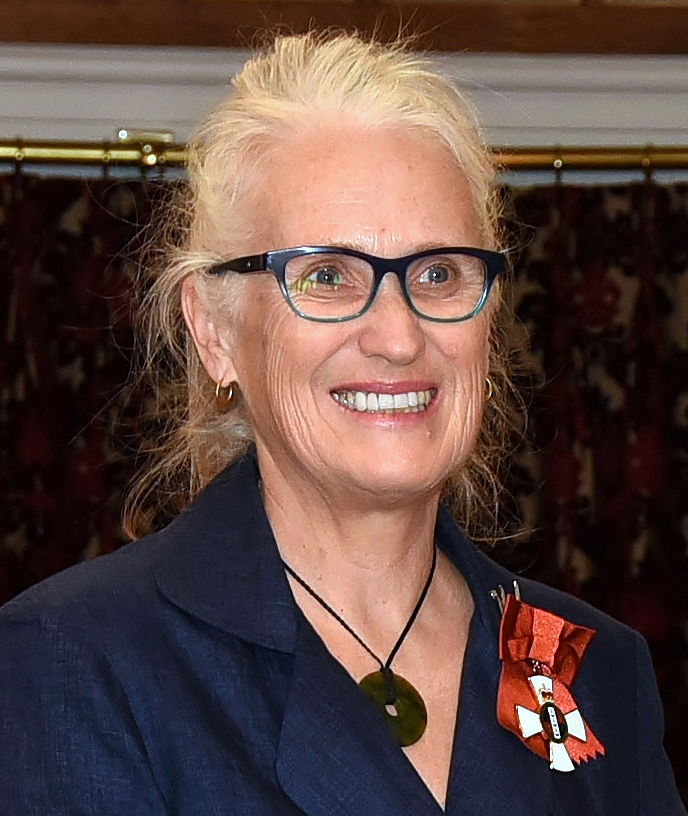
Jane Campion, Best Director winner

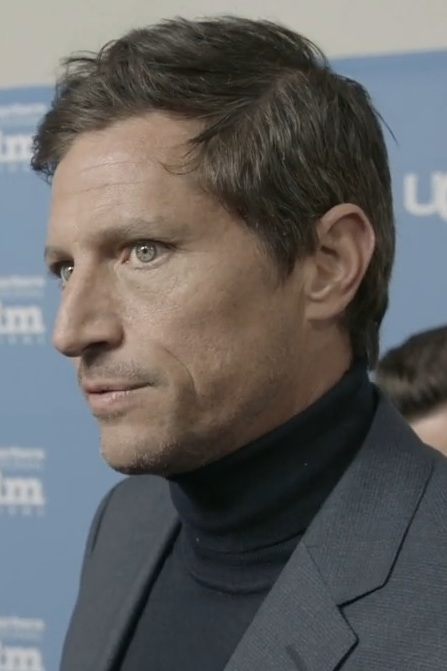
Simon Rex, Best Actor winner

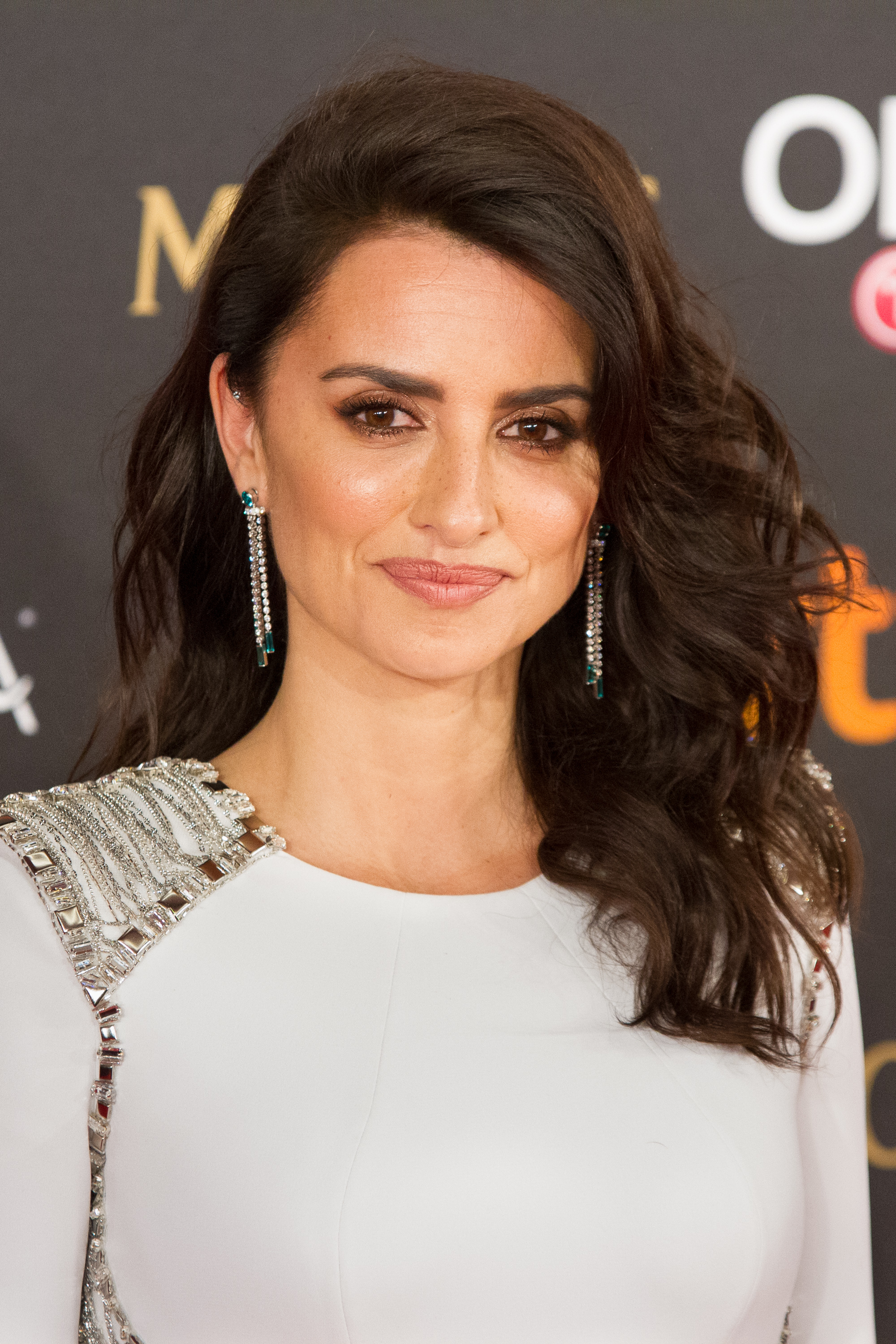
Penélope Cruz, Best Actress winner

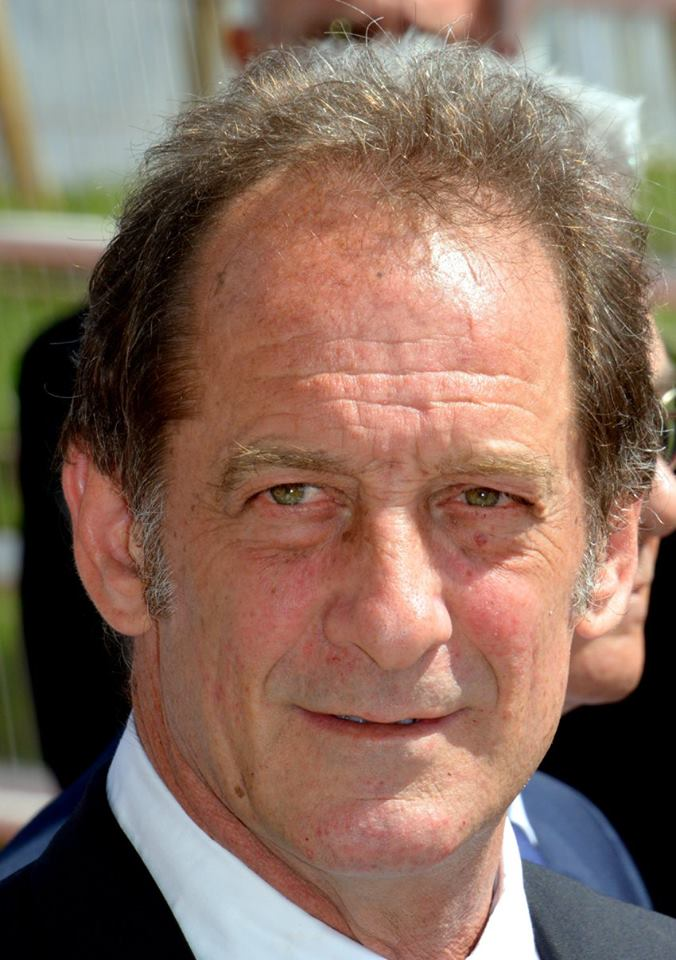
Vincent Lindon, Best Supporting Actor co-winner

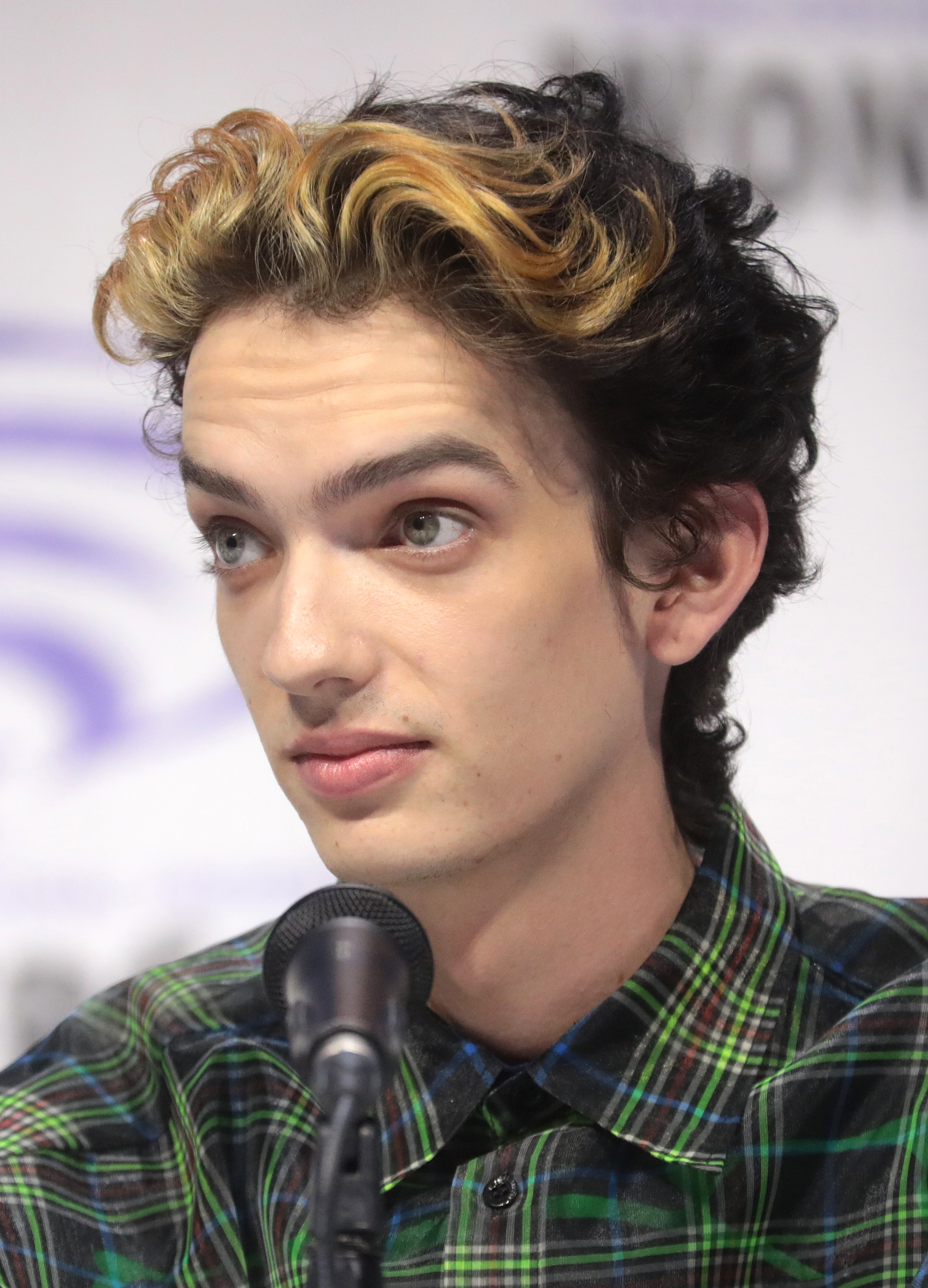
Kodi Smit-McPhee, Best Supporting Actor co-winner

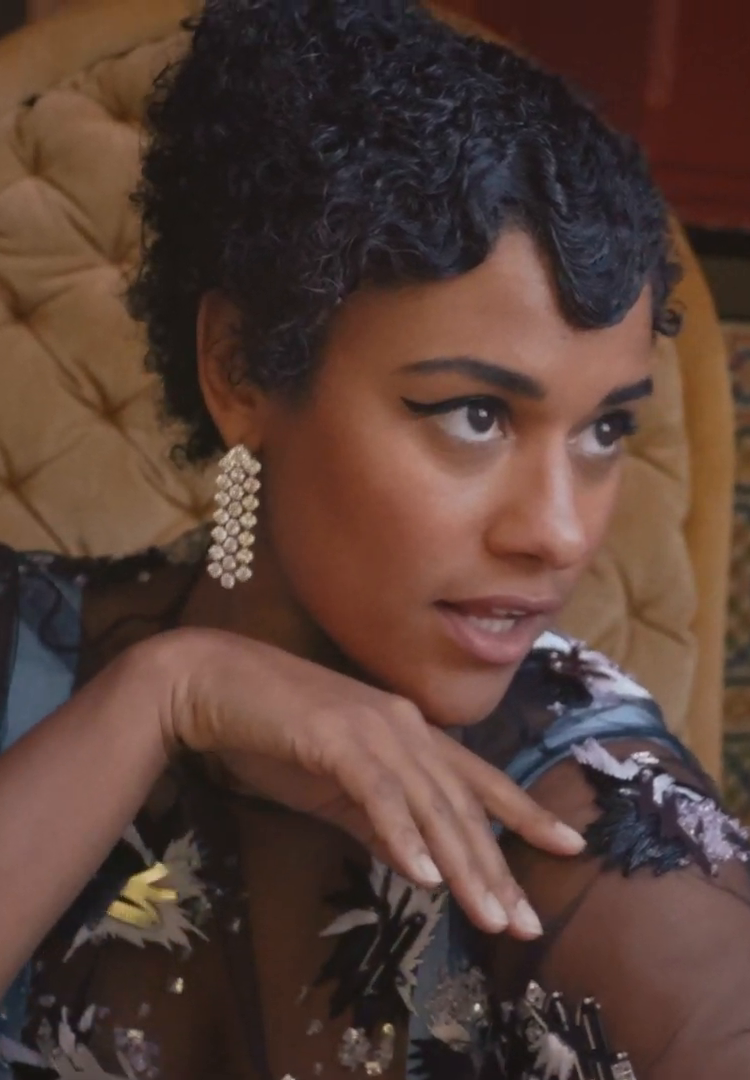
Ariana DeBose, Best Supporting Actress winner

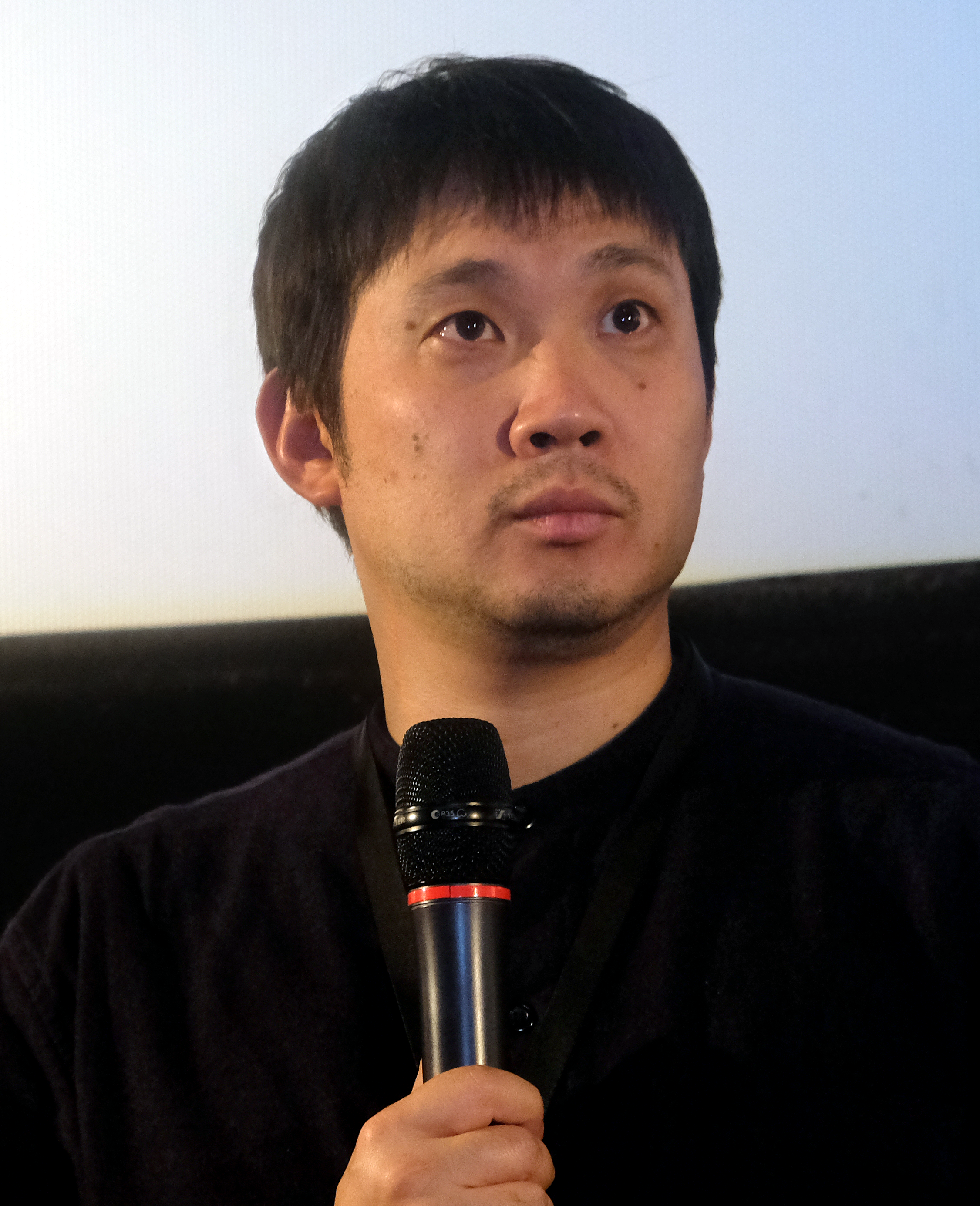
Ryusuke Hamaguchi, Best Screenplay co-winner

- Best Film:
  - Drive My Car
    - Runner-up: The Power of the Dog
- Best Director:
  - Jane Campion – The Power of the Dog
    - Runner-up: Ryusuke Hamaguchi – Drive My Car
- Best Actor:
  - Simon Rex – Red Rocket
    - Runner-up: Benedict Cumberbatch – The Power of the Dog
- Best Actress:
  - Penélope Cruz – Parallel Mothers
    - Runner-up: Renate Reinsve – The Worst Person in the World
- Best Supporting Actor (TIE):
  - Vincent Lindon – Titane
  - Kodi Smit-McPhee – The Power of the Dog
- Best Supporting Actress:
  - Ariana DeBose – West Side Story
    - Runner-up: Aunjanue Ellis – King Richard
- Best Screenplay:
  - Ryusuke Hamaguchi and Takamasa Oe – Drive My Car
    - Runner-up: Paul Thomas Anderson – Licorice Pizza
- Best Cinematography:
  - Ari Wegner – The Power of the Dog
    - Runner-up: Greig Fraser – Dune
- Best Editing:
  - Joshua L. Pearson – Summer of Soul (...Or, When the Revolution Could Not Be Televised)
    - Runner-up: Andy Jurgensen – Licorice Pizza
- Best Music Score:
  - Alberto Iglesias – Parallel Mothers
    - Runner-up: Jonny Greenwood – The Power of the Dog and Spencer
- Best Production Design:
  - Steve Saklad – Barb and Star Go to Vista Del Mar
    - Runner-up: Tamara Deverell – Nightmare Alley
- Best Foreign Language Film:
  - Petite Maman
    - Runner-up: Quo Vadis, Aida?
- Best Documentary/Non-Fiction Film:
  - Summer of Soul (...Or, When the Revolution Could Not Be Televised)
    - Runner-up: Procession
- Best Animation:
  - Flee
    - Runner-up: Belle
- New Generation Award (TIE):
  - Shatara Michelle Ford – Test Pattern
  - Tatiana Huezo – Prayers for the Stolen
- Career Achievement Award:
  - Mel Brooks
- The Douglas Edwards Experimental/Independent Film/Video Award:
  - The Works and Days (of Tayoko Shiojiri in the Shiotani Basin)
- Special Citation:
  - L.A. Rebellion
