= Boston Society of Film Critics Awards 2021 =

Annual US film awards ceremony

42nd BSFC Awards

December 12, 2021

Best Film:
Drive My Car

The 42nd Boston Society of Film Critics Awards, honoring the best in filmmaking in 2021, were given on December 12, 2021.

== Winners ==
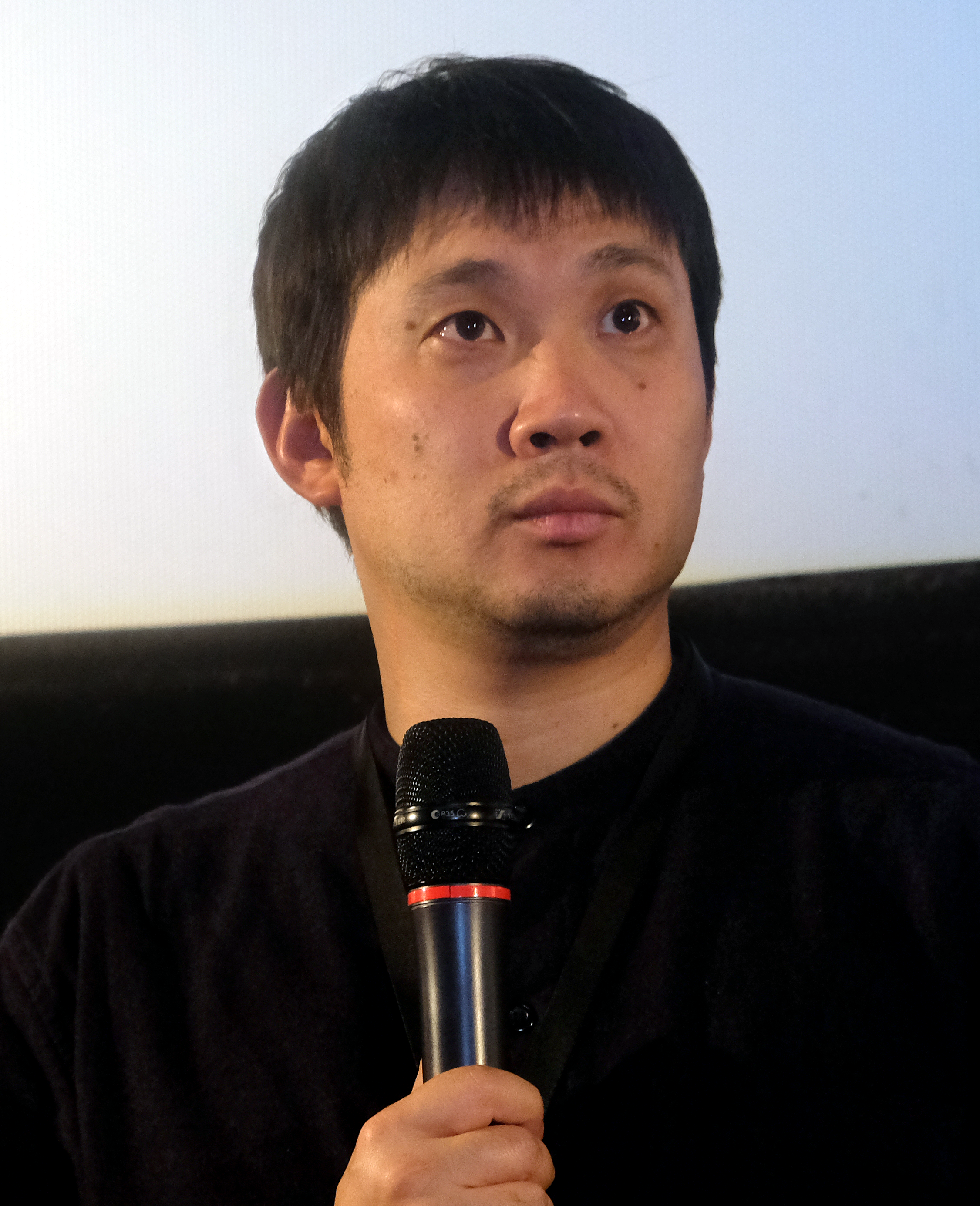
Ryusuke Hamaguchi, Best Director winner and Best Screenplay co-winner

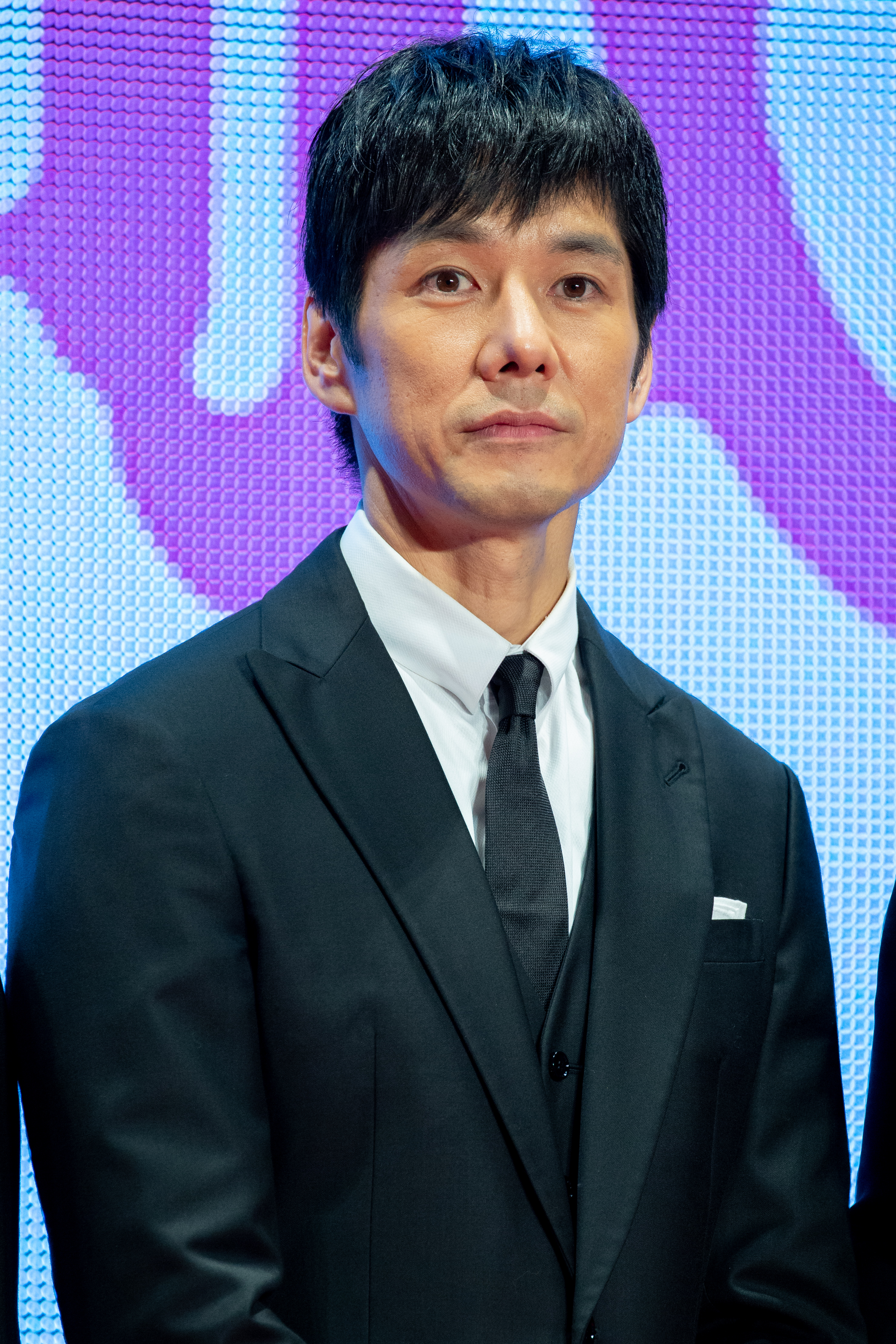
Hidetoshi Nishijima, Best Actor winner

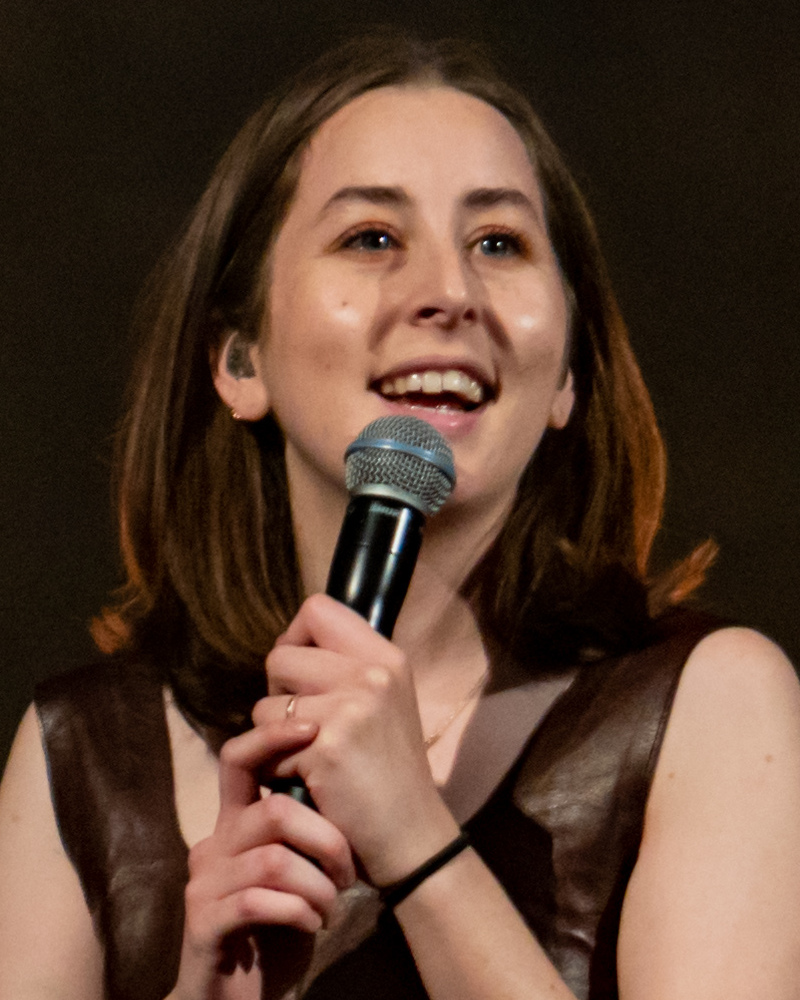
Alana Haim, Best Actress winner

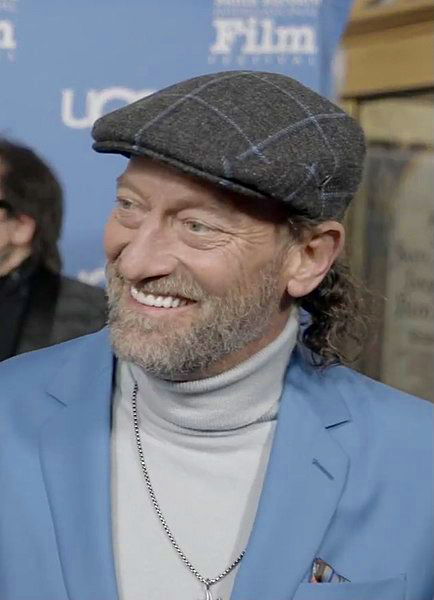
Troy Kotsur, Best Supporting Actor winner

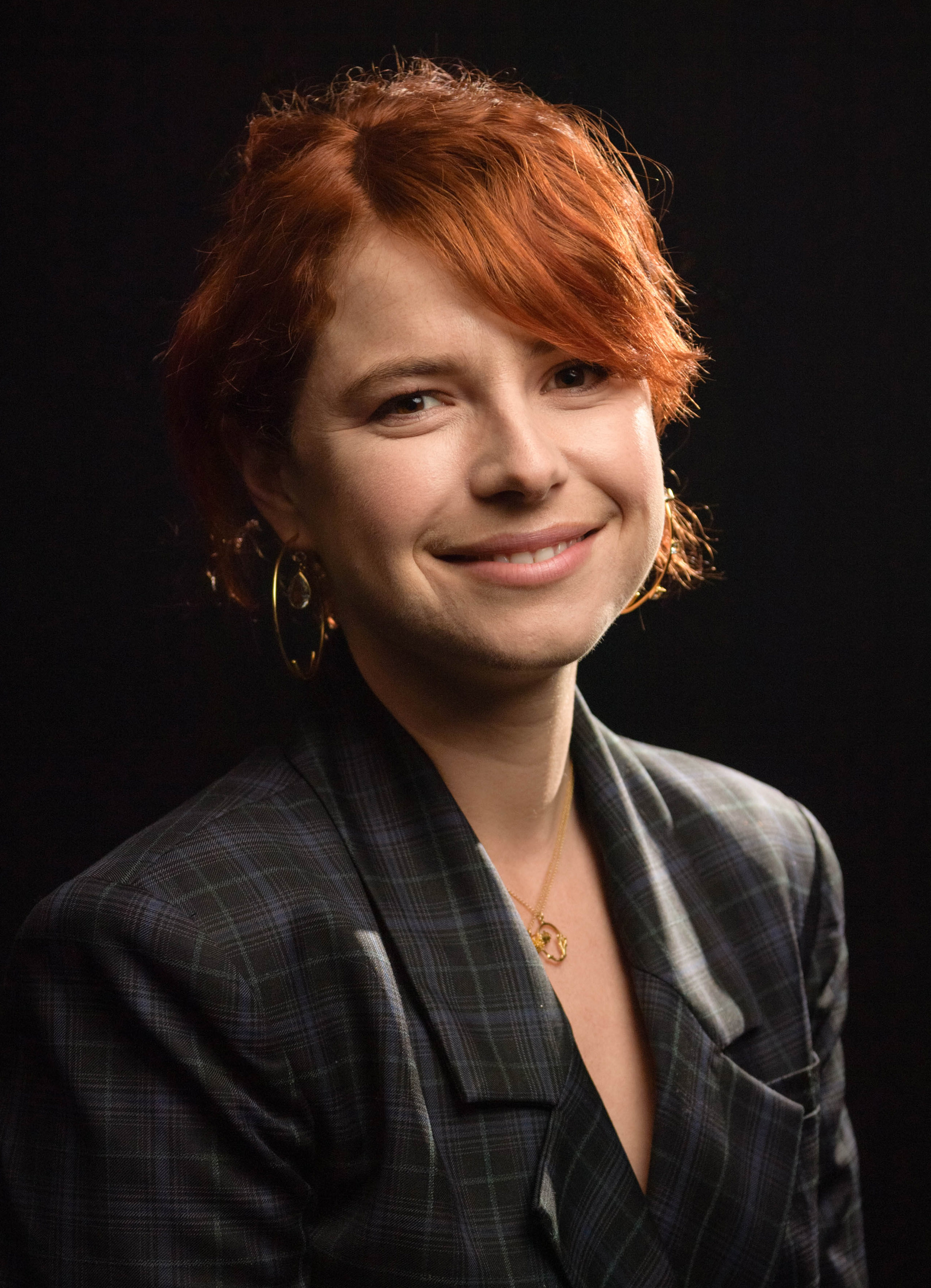
Jessie Buckley, Best Supporting Actress winner

- Best Picture:
  - Drive My Car
- Best Director:
  - Ryusuke Hamaguchi – Drive My Car
- Best Actor:
  - Hidetoshi Nishijima – Drive My Car
- Best Actress:
  - Alana Haim – Licorice Pizza
- Best Supporting Actor:
  - Troy Kotsur – CODA
- Best Supporting Actress:
  - Jessie Buckley – The Lost Daughter
- Best Screenplay:
  - Ryusuke Hamaguchi and Takamasa Oe – Drive My Car
- Best Animated Film:
  - Flee
- Best Documentary:
  - Summer of Soul (...Or, When the Revolution Could Not Be Televised)
- Best English Language Film:
  - The Power of the Dog
- Best Cinematography:
  - Ari Wegner – The Power of the Dog
- Best Film Editing:
  - Affonso Gonçalves and Adam Kurnitz – The Velvet Underground
- Best Original Score:
  - Jonny Greenwood – Spencer
- Best New Filmmaker:
  - Maggie Gyllenhaal – The Lost Daughter
- Best Ensemble Cast:
  - Licorice Pizza
