= San Francisco Bay Area Film Critics Circle Awards 2021 =

20th San Francisco Bay Area Film Critics Circle Awards

20th SFBAFCC Awards

January 10, 2022

Best Picture:
The Power of the Dog

Best Animated Feature:
Encanto

Best Documentary Feature:
Summer of Soul (...Or, When the Revolution Could Not Be Televised)

Best Foreign Language Film:
Drive My Car

The 20th San Francisco Bay Area Film Critics Circle Awards, honoring the best in film for 2021, were given on January 10, 2022. The nominations were announced on January 7, 2022, with The Power of the Dog leading the nominations with nine. The film also received the most awards, with eight wins, including Best Picture.

== Winners and nominees ==
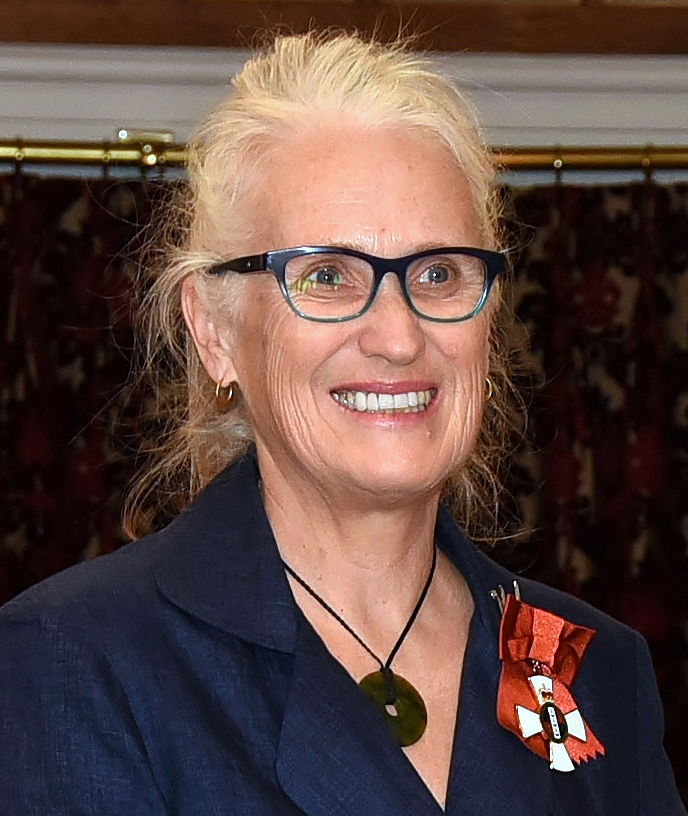
Jane Campion, Best Director and Best Adapted Screenplay winner

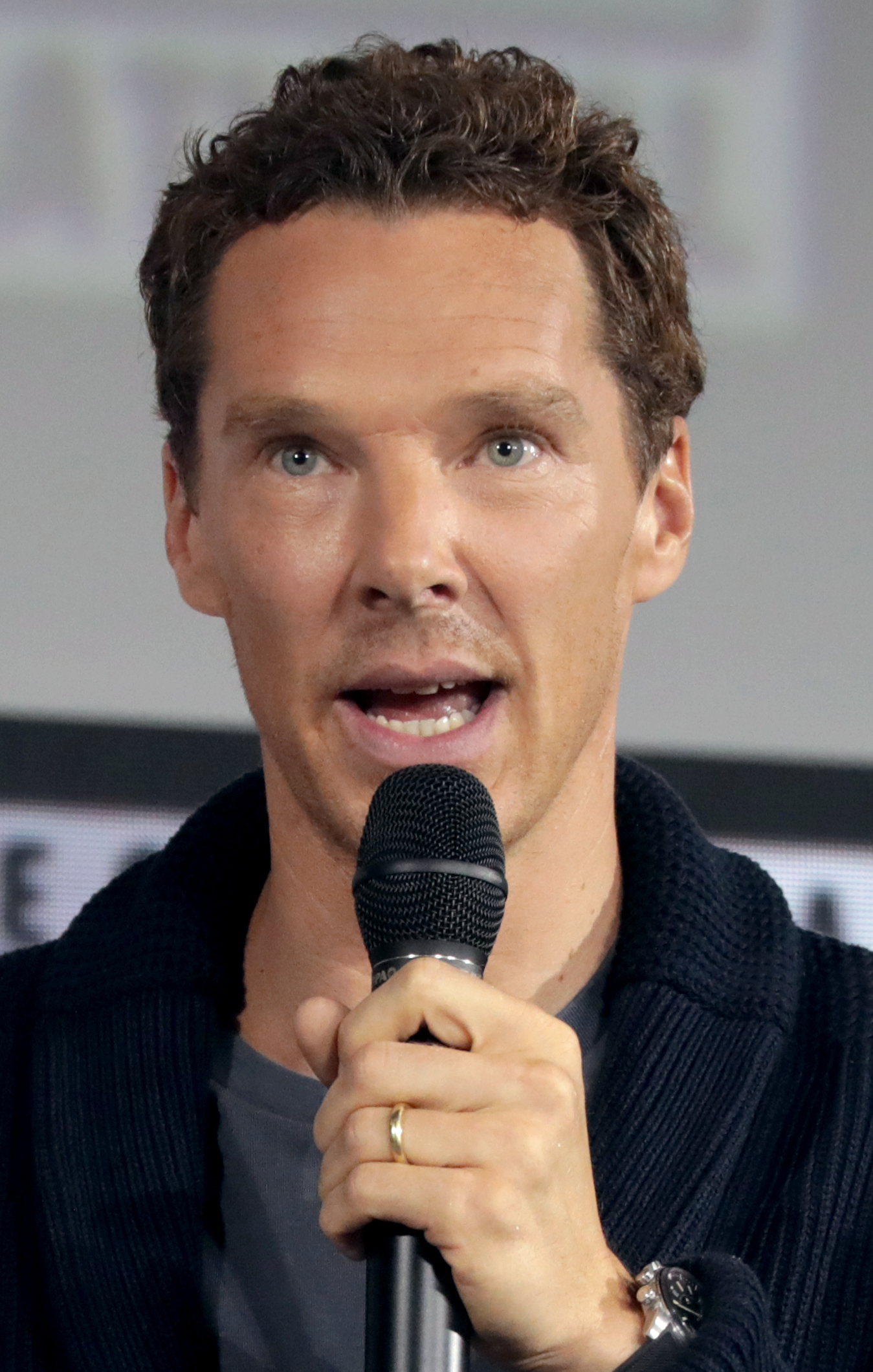
Benedict Cumberbatch, Best Actor winner

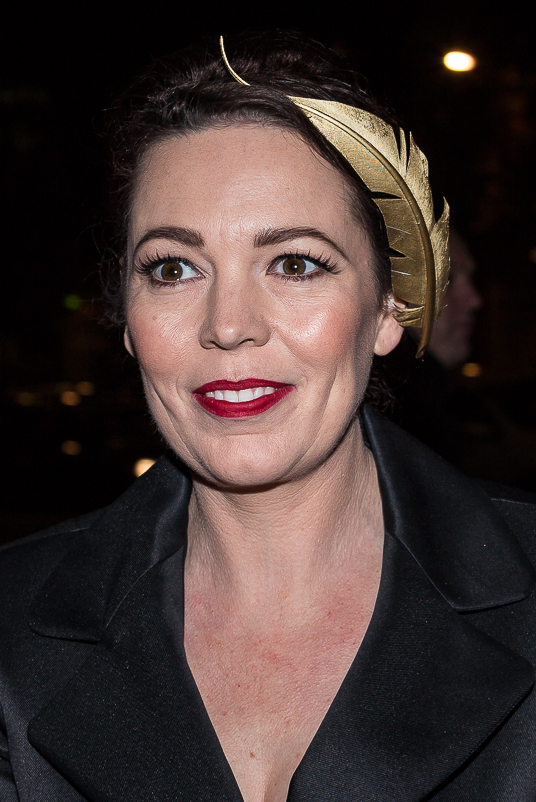
Olivia Colman, Best Actress winner

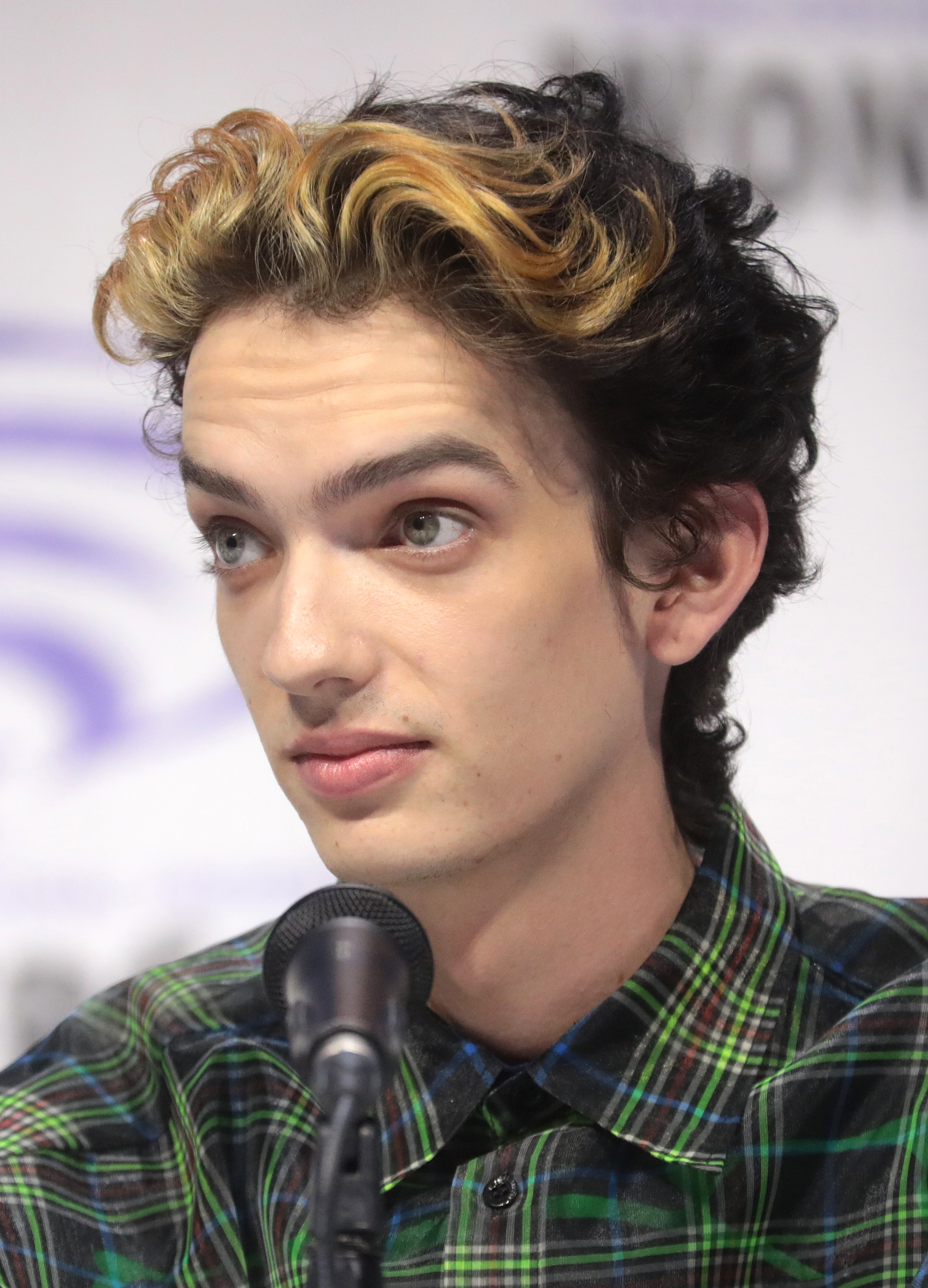
Kodi Smit-McPhee, Best Supporting Actor winner

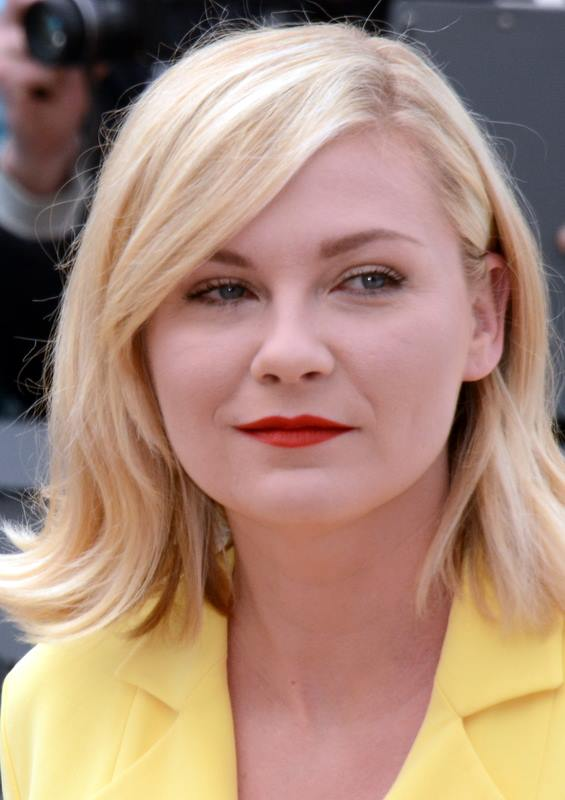
Kirsten Dunst, Best Supporting Actress winner

These are the nominees for the 20th SFFCC Awards. Winners are listed at the top of each list:

Best Picture	Best Director
The Power of the Dog; Drive My Car; The Green Knight; Licorice Pizza; West Side Story	Jane Campion – The Power of the Dog; Maggie Gyllenhaal – The Lost Daughter; Ryusuke Hamaguchi – Drive My Car; Steven Spielberg – West Side Story; Denis Villeneuve – Dune
Best Actor	Best Actress
Benedict Cumberbatch – The Power of the Dog as Phil Burbank; Nicolas Cage – Pig as Robin "Rob" Feld; Andrew Garfield – tick, tick... BOOM! as Jonathan Larson; Hidetoshi Nishijima – Drive My Car as Yūsuke Kafuku; Will Smith – King Richard as Richard Williams; Denzel Washington – The Tragedy of Macbeth as Lord Macbeth	Olivia Colman – The Lost Daughter as Leda Caruso; Jessica Chastain – The Eyes of Tammy Faye as Tammy Faye Bakker; Penélope Cruz – Parallel Mothers as Janis Martinez; Kristen Stewart – Spencer as Diana, Princess of Wales; Tessa Thompson – Passing as Irene "Reenie" Redfield
Best Supporting Actor	Best Supporting Actress
Kodi Smit-McPhee – The Power of the Dog as Peter Gordon; Bradley Cooper – Licorice Pizza as Jon Peters; Ciarán Hinds – Belfast as Pop; Troy Kotsur – CODA as Frank Rossi; J. K. Simmons – Being the Ricardos as William Frawley	Kirsten Dunst – The Power of the Dog as Rose Gordon; Jessie Buckley – The Lost Daughter as Young Leda Caruso; Ariana DeBose – West Side Story as Anita; Marlee Matlin – CODA as Jackie Rossi; Ruth Negga – Passing as Clare Bellew
Best Adapted Screenplay	Best Original Screenplay
Jane Campion – The Power of the Dog; Maggie Gyllenhaal – The Lost Daughter; Rebecca Hall – Passing; Ryusuke Hamaguchi and Takamasa Oe – Drive My Car; Eric Roth, Jon Spaihts, and Denis Villeneuve – Dune	Mike Mills – C'mon C'mon; Paul Thomas Anderson – Licorice Pizza; Kenneth Branagh – Belfast; Adam McKay and David Sirota – Don't Look Up; Aaron Sorkin – Being the Ricardos
Best Animated Feature	Best Documentary Feature
Encanto; Belle; Flee (Honorable Mention); Luca; The Mitchells vs. the Machines	Summer of Soul (...Or, When the Revolution Could Not Be Televised); Flee; Procession; The Rescue; The Velvet Underground
Best Foreign Language Film	Best Cinematography
Drive My Car; Flee; A Hero; Parallel Mothers; The Worst Person in the World	Bruno Delbonnel – The Tragedy of Macbeth; Greig Fraser – Dune; Janusz Kamiński – West Side Story; Dan Laustsen – Nightmare Alley; Andrew Droz Palermo – The Green Knight; Ari Wegner – The Power of the Dog; Robert Yeoman – The French Dispatch
Best Film Editing	Best Original Score
Peter Sciberras – The Power of the Dog; Sarah Broshar and Michael Kahn – West Side Story; Úna Ní Dhonghaíle – Belfast; Andy Jurgensen – Licorice Pizza; Joe Walker – Dune	Jonny Greenwood – The Power of the Dog; Alexandre Desplat – The French Dispatch; Jonny Greenwood – Spencer; Daniel Hart – The Green Knight; Hans Zimmer – Dune
Best Production Design
Tamara Deverell – Nightmare Alley; Stefan Dechant – The Tragedy of Macbeth; Jade Healy – The Green Knight; Adam Stockhausen – The French Dispatch; Patrice Vermette – Dune

== Special awards ==
=== Special Citation for Independent Cinema ===
- Kuessipan (TIE)
- Test Pattern (TIE)

=== Marlon Riggs Award ===
- Rita Moreno
