= Hidetoshi Nishijima (actor) =

Japanese actor (born 1971)

- 西島 秀俊
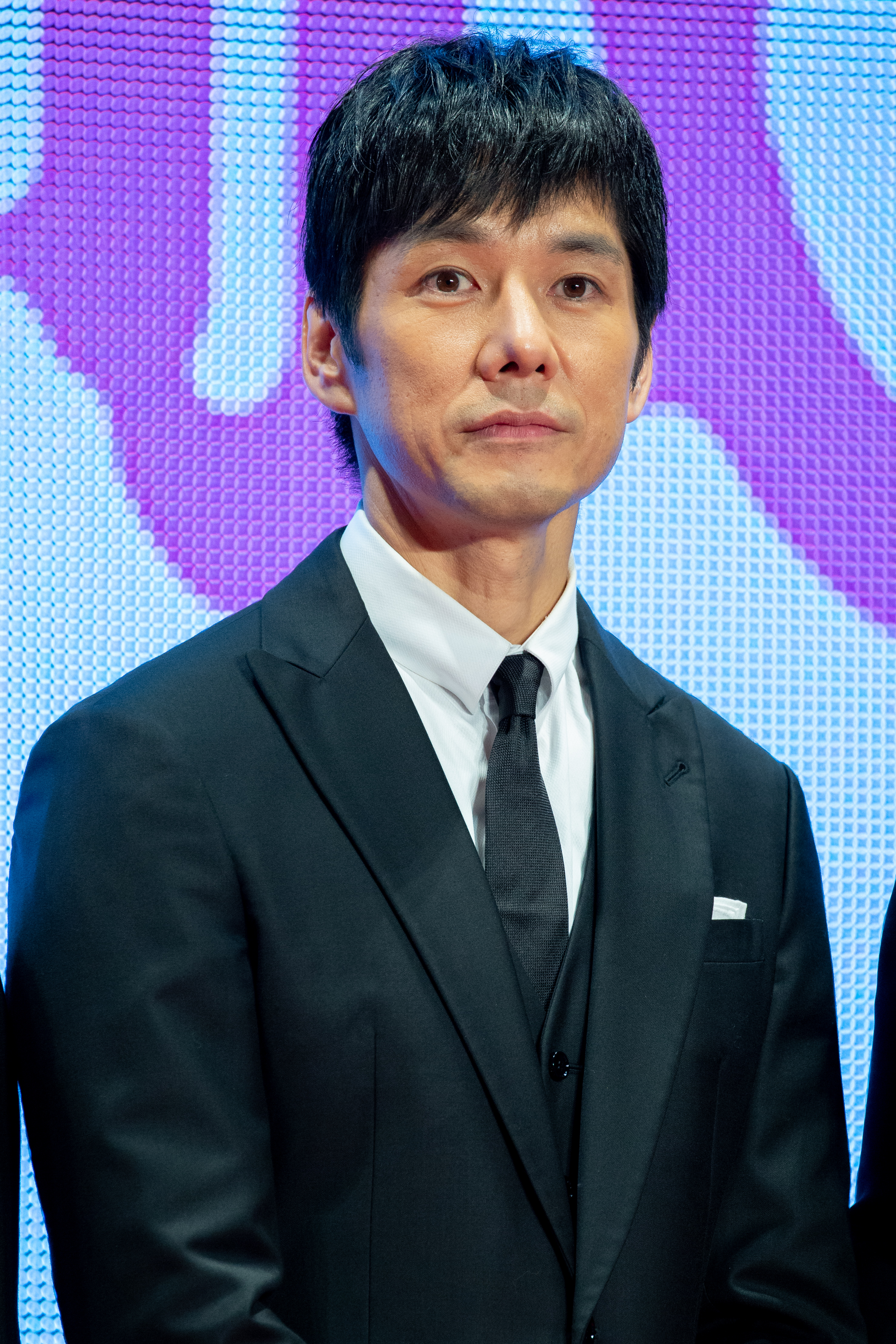
- Nishijima at the 2018 Tokyo International Film Festival
- Born: March 29, 1971 (age 55); Hachiōji, Tokyo, Japan
- Education: Yokohama National University
- Occupation: Actor model
- Years active: 1992–present
- Spouse: Ayaka Mori (m. 2014)
- Children: 2

Hidetoshi Nishijima (Japanese: 西島 秀俊, Hepburn: Nishijima Hidetoshi; born March 29, 1971) is a Japanese actor and model. He is widely regarded as one of Japan's leading actors, having appeared in a wide range of films from science fiction films such as Shin Ultraman (2022) to small-scale art films such as Dolls (2002). He gained international recognition for his critically acclaimed leading role in the 2021 film Drive My Car, for which he received the Japan Academy Film Prize for Best Actor.

== Life and career ==
=== Early years ===
Nishijima became interested in watching films as a child, influenced by his father. He wanted to be a film crew member, but while in college, he passed the acting audition that an acquaintance encouraged him to take, and he became an actor.

=== Career ===
Nishijima made his debut in the contemporary detective television drama series Hagure Keiji Junjōha in 1992.

In 1993, Nishijima gained public recognition for his portrayal of a gay character in the massive hit television series Asunaro Hakusho, which co-starred Takuya Kimura. Nishijima’s subtle performance and good looks in that series attracted attention. in 1994 as Man of the Month for November of1994 It was published in Playgirl magazine in November 1994 and was photographed naked by Naoko Yamamoto.

In 1990s, Nishijima gained popularity as a young actor in television series, but left a major talent agency to become a film actor, and did not appear on commercial television from 1998 to 2002.

Nishijima played his first leading role in Kiyoshi Kurosawa's 1998 film License to Live, and co-starred with Kōji Yakusho. He won the Best Actor award at the Japan Film Professional Awards for the film.

Nishijima attracted attention again later, being selected by Takeshi Kitano for the lead role in Dolls in 2002. The film was a major turning point in his career.

In 2009, he was given the Best Supporting Actor award at the Yokohama Film Festival for his portrayal of a strange death row inmate in Vacation.

While establishing himself as a film actor, Nishijima also resumed appearing in television series.

In the 2010s, Nishijima became one of the most popular actors in Japan, for his performances in hit television series, such as General Rouge no Gaisen, Strawberry Night, Yae's Sakura, and MOZU.

In 2011, Nishijima had his first starring role alongside Korean actress Kim Tae-hee in the television series My 99 Days with the Superstar, a romantic comedy drama about the romance between an actress and her bodyguard.

In Amir Naderi's 2011 film Cut, Nishijima played the leading role, which was described by Chris Cabin of Slant Magazine as "the most convincingly pretentious and frustrated cinephile to ever be portrayed on film". His performance in the film was praised by Dan Fainaru of Screen International as "painfully memorable".

Nishijima has also appeared in films such as Akihiko Shiota's Canary and Kiyoshi Kurosawa's Loft. He also played the role of Kiro Honjo in Hayao Miyazaki's 2013 animated film The Wind Rises as a voice actor. His other voice work includes dubbing Colin Farrell in Dumbo and Detective Pikachu (Ryan Reynolds) in Pokémon Detective Pikachu. He also portrayed the role of Kotaro Minami in the reimaging of the 1987 Kamen Rider series Kamen Rider Black titled Kamen Rider Black Sun.

In 2017, Nishijima became the first Japanese man to model for Giorgio Armani's Made-to-Measure.

In 2019, Nishijima was nominated for Best Supporting Actor at the 42nd Japan Academy Film Prize for his performance in Samurai's Promise. He also starred in the television series What Did You Eat Yesterday?, a drama about the daily lives of a middle-aged gay couple. The drama became very popular and was made into a hit film.

In 2021, Nishijima starred in Ryusuke Hamaguchi's film Drive My Car. His performance was highly acclaimed, with The New York Times selecting him as one of the "Best Actors of 2021". The film also won him the National Society of Film Critics Award for Best Actor, Boston Society of Film Critics Award for Best Actor, and Japan Academy Film Prize for Outstanding Performance by an Actor in a Leading Role.

In June 2022, Nishijima was invited to become a member of the Academy of Motion Picture Arts and Sciences.

== Filmography ==
=== Film ===
Year	Title	Role	Notes	Ref.
1994	Ghost Pub	Koichi		
1995	Marks no Yama	Mori		
1995	Kura	Ryota Takeda		
1997	2/Duo	Kei		
1998	License to Live	Yutaka	Lead role	
2000	Love/Juice	Sakamoto		
2001	Sekai no Owari to Iu Na no Zakkaten		Lead role	
2002	Dolls	Matsumoto		
2002	Tokyo.sora			
2002	Last Scene		Lead role	
2004	Casshern	Lieutenant Colonel Kamijo		
2004	Tony Takitani	Narrator (voice)		
2004	The Cat Leaves Home			
2004	Kikyo			
2004	Angel in the Box			
2005	House of Himiko	Hosokawa		
2005	Sayonara Midori-chan			
2005	Su-ki-da	Yosuke		
2005	Loft	Koichi Kijima		
2005	Canary	Akira Izawa		
2006	Oh! Oku	Shingoro Ikushima		
2007	Freesia: Bullet Over Tears	Toshio Iwasaki		
2007	Pacchigi! Love & Peace			
2007	Shindo			
2008	Tokyo Rendezvous	Takashi Nogami	Lead role	
2008	Vacation	Shin'ichi Kaneda		
2008	Over the Hilltop	Ma Hae-song		
2008	Haru Yo Koi [ja]	Toshio Okamoto		
2009	Kanikōsen	Asakawa		
2009	Zero Focus	Kenichi Ubara		
2010	Goodbye, Someday	Yutaka Higashigaito	Lead role; South Korean film	
2011	Cut	Shuji	Lead role	
2012	Seiji: Riku no Sakana	Seiji	Lead role	
2013	Strawberry Night	Kazuo Kikuta		
2013	Memories Corner	Okabe		
2013	The Wind Rises	Kiro Honjo (voice)		
2014	Genome Hazard	Taketo Ishigami	Lead role	
2015	Mozu	Naotake Kuraki	Lead role	
2015	Poison berry in my brain	Yoshida		
2016	Creepy	Takakura	Lead role	
2016	While the Women Are Sleeping	Kenji		
2017	The Last Recipe	Yamagata		
2018	Samurai's Promise	Uneme Sakakibara		
2018	The House Where the Mermaid Sleeps	Kazumasa Harima		
2018	Ozland	Yoshihiko Ozuka		
2018	Penguin Highway	Aoyama's Father (voice)		
2019	Ninkyō Gakuen	Seiji Himura	Lead role	
2019	Aircraft Carrier Ibuki	Ryōta Akitsu	Lead role	
2020	Voices in the Wind	Morio		
2020	Silent Tokyo	Shinobu Seta		
2021	99.9 Criminal Lawyer: The Movie	Kyōhei Nagumo		
2021	What Did You Eat Yesterday?	Shirō Kakei	Lead role	
2021	Caution, Hazardous Wife	Yūki Isayama		
2021	Drive My Car	Yūsuke Kafuku	Lead role	
2022	Shin Ultraman	Kimio Tamura		
2022	Goodbye Cruel World	Mikiya Anzai	Lead role	
2023	Kubi	Akechi Mitsuhide		
2024	Serpent's Path	Yoshimura	French-Japanese film	
2024	All About Suomi	Keigo Kusano		
2025	Dear Stranger	Kenji	Lead role; Japan/Taiwan/US film	
2026	The Brightest Sun	Satake	Lead role	
2026	Her Private Hell	Hayashi	American film	
2027	All That Exists	Jiro Monden	Lead role	
TBA	Enemies		American film	
TBA	Road House 2		American film	

=== Television ===
Year	Title	Role	Notes	Ref.
1992	Hagure Keiji Junjōha	Tsuyoshi Nakagami	Season 5	
1992	Dinner On Thursday	Tatsuro Miyazawa		
1993	Asunaro Hakusho	Junichiro Matsuoka		
1997	Mori Motonari	Aiō Mototsuna	Taiga drama	
2003	Always Smiling	Kazuya Yuzuhara		
2004	Ōoku	Tokugawa Iemitsu		
2004	Waltz Of Her Heart	Shinya Minazuki		
2006	Unfair	Ichiro Sezaki		
2006	Junjō Kirari	Suji Togo	Asadora	
2007	Yama Onna Kabe Onna	Iguchi Shohei		
2007	Judge: The Struggle of the Island Judge	Kyosuke Misawa		
2009	Real Clothes	Yusaku Tabuchi		
2010	General Rouge no Gaisen	Koichi Hayami		
2011	School	Iori Kirihara		
2011	Boku to Star no 99 Nichi	Kohei Namiki	Lead role	
2012	Double Face	Jun Moriya	Lead role	
2012	Strawberry Night	Kazuo Kikuta		
2013	Yae's Sakura	Yamamoto Kakuma	Taiga drama	
2015	Mutsu: Mieru Me	Eisuke Tameyori	Lead role	
2015	Second Chance Chauffeur	Kazuo Nagata	Lead role	
2016	Daddy Sister	Takezō Kohashi	Asadora	
2017	Crisis	Saburo Tamaru		
2017	Blanket Cats	Shusuke Shiina		
2017	Caution, Hazardous Wife	Yuki Isayama		
2019	Detective Akechi Kogoro	Kogoro Akechi		
2019	Maison de Police	Soichiro Natsume		
2019–23	What Did You Eat Yesterday?	Shiro Kakei	Lead role; 2 seasons	
2020	North Light	Minoru Aose	Lead role; miniseries	
2021	Welcome Home, Monet	Satoru Asaoka	Asadora	
2021	Guilty Flag	Ryosuke Sagara	Lead role	
2021	Chef Is A Great Detective	Shinobu Mifune	Lead role	
2022	Riding a Unicorn	Satoshi Kotori		
2022	Kamen Rider Black Sun	Kōtarō Minami / Kamen Rider Black Sun	Lead role	
2023	Outsider Cops	Eiji Kagawa	Lead role	
2024	Sayonara Maestro	Shunpei Natsume	Lead role	
2024	Sunny	Masa Sakamoto		
2025	Human Specimens	Shiro Sakaki	Lead role	

=== Dubbing roles ===
- Dumbo (2019), Holt Farrier (Colin Farrell)
- Pokémon Detective Pikachu (2019), Detective Pikachu (Ryan Reynolds)

== Awards and nominations ==
Year	Association	Category	Nominated work	Result	Ref.
2000	9th Japan Film Professional Awards	Best Actor	License to Live	Won	
2006	15th Japan Film Professional Awards	Best Actor	Kikyō, Sayonara Midori-chan, Ame Yori Setsunaku	Won	
2006	20th Takasaki Film Festival	Best Actor	Kikyō	Won	
2009	30th Yokohama Film Festival	Best Supporting Actor	Vacation, Tokyo Rendezvous and Over the Hilltop	Won	
2012	26th Takasaki Film Festival	Best Actor	Cut	Won	
2012	21st Japan Film Professional Awards	Best Actor	Cut	Won	
2019	42nd Japan Academy Film Prize	Best Supporting Actor	Samurai's Promise	Nominated	
2021	14th Asia Pacific Screen Awards	Best Performance by an Actor	Drive My Car	Nominated	
2021	42nd Boston Society of Film Critics Awards	Best Actor	Drive My Car	Won	
2021	34th Chicago Film Critics Association Awards	Best Actor	Drive My Car	Nominated	
2021	34th Nikkan Sports Film Award	Best Actor	Drive My Car	Won	
2022	76th Mainichi Film Awards	Best Actor	Drive My Car	Nominated	
2022	35th Takasaki Film Festival	Best Actor	Drive My Car	Won	
2022	45th Japan Academy Film Prize	Best Actor	Drive My Car	Won	
2022	56th National Society of Film Critics Awards	Best Actor	Drive My Car	Won	
2022	25th Online Film Critics Society Awards	Best Actor	Drive My Car	Nominated	
2022	20th San Francisco Bay Area Film Critics Circle Awards	Best Actor	Drive My Car	Nominated	
2023	16th Asian Film Awards	Best Actor	Drive My Car	Nominated	
