= Mutsu: Mieru Me =

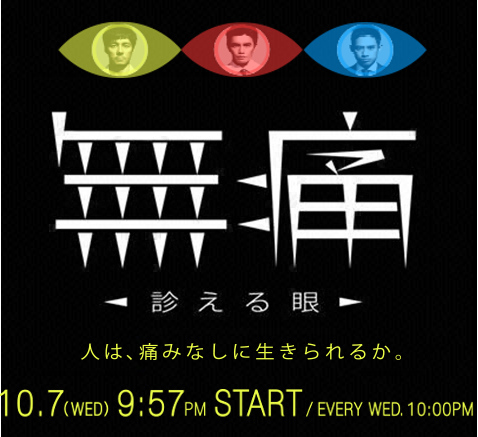
- Also known as: Painless: The Eyes for Signs
- Genre: Medical, Detective, Mystery
- Created by: Yo Kusakabe (novel); Tomomi Okubo (writer)
- Directed by: Yuichi Sato; Takao Kinoshita
- Starring: Hidetoshi Nishijima; Hideaki Itō
- Country of origin: Japan
- Original language: Japanese

Production
- Running time: Wednesdays at 22:00 (JST)

Original release
- Network: Fuji TV
- Release: 7 October 2015

Mutsu: Mieru Me (無痛~診える眼~, Painless: The Eyes for Signs) is a 2015 Fuji TV Japanese television drama, starring Hidetoshi Nishijima and Hideaki Itō in the lead roles. It started airing from 7 October 2015 and the end of airing has not been confirmed.

== Storyline ==
The storyline was based on the novel Mutsu by Yo Kusakabe. Eisuke Tameyori (Hidetoshi Nishijima) is a middle-aged private practice physician (general practitioner.) He has the ability to diagnose someone's condition just by looking at them. He is also able to recognize people who will commit crimes in the future by looking for certain symptoms, which he calls 'The markers of Criminal Intent'. After meeting Detective Junichiro Hayase (Atsushi Ito), they soon work together to solve cases.

== Characters ==
Eisuke Tameyori
Played by:Hidetoshi Nishijima

Junichiro Hayase
Played by: Atsushi Itō

Yoji Shirakami
Played by: Hideaki Itō

Namiko Takashima
Played by: Anna Ishibashi

Ibara
Played by: Aoi Nakamura

Satomi Minami
Played by: Minami Hamabe

Kazue Inoue
Played by: Miyoko Asada

Minoru Kurume
Played by: Masane Tsukayama

Ikiyoharu Yoko
Played by: Maki Miyamoto

Takeshi Oota
Played by: Toru Baba

== Streaming ==
The drama started streaming in Apple TV+, Prime video from 2021. The show also has an 20 song original soundtrack by Satoru Shionoya that was released 7 November of the same year that is available in Deezer.
