= Drive My Car (film) =

2021 film by Ryusuke Hamaguchi

- Theatrical release poster

Japanese name
- Kana: ドライブ・マイ・カー
Transcriptions
- Revised Hepburn: Doraibu Mai Kā
- Directed by: Ryusuke Hamaguchi
- Screenplay by: Ryusuke Hamaguchi; Takamasa Oe
- Based on: "Drive My Car" by Haruki Murakami
- Produced by: Teruhisa Yamamoto
- Starring: Hidetoshi Nishijima; Tōko Miura; Reika Kirishima; Park Yu-rim; Jin Dae-yeon; Sonia Yuan; Ahn Hwitae; Perry Dizon; Satoko Abe; Masaki Okada
- Cinematography: Hidetoshi Shinomiya
- Edited by: Azusa Yamazaki
- Music by: Eiko Ishibashi
- Production companies: C&I Entertainment; Culture Entertainment; Bitters End; Nekojarashi; Quaras; Nippon Shuppan Hanbai; Bungeishunjū; L'Espace Vision; The Asahi Shimbun Company
- Distributed by: Bitters End
- Release dates: 11 July 2021 (Cannes); 20 August 2021 (Japan)
- Running time: 179 minutes
- Country: Japan
- Language: Japanese
- Budget: $1.3 million
- Box office: $15.4 million

Drive My Car (Japanese: ドライブ・マイ・カー, Hepburn: Doraibu Mai Kā) is a 2021 Japanese drama film directed by Ryusuke Hamaguchi, who co-wrote the screenplay with Takamasa Oe. Based on the 2014 short story by Haruki Murakami, it stars Hidetoshi Nishijima as a theatre director who directs a multilingual production of Uncle Vanya while dealing with the death of his wife. Reika Kirishima, Tōko Miura, Park Yu-rim, Jin Dae-yeon, Sonia Yuan, Ahn Hwitae, Perry Dizon, Satoko Abe, and Masaki Okada also star.

Drive My Car had its world premiere at the 2021 Cannes Film Festival, where it competed for the Palme d'Or and won three awards, including Best Screenplay. The film received widespread critical acclaim with praise towards Hamaguchi's direction and screenplay; many declared it the best film of 2021. It was nominated for four awards at the 94th Academy Awards, winning Best International Feature Film, and received numerous other accolades. Drive My Car was the first Japanese film to receive a Best Picture nomination. It has since been called one of the best films of the 2020s and of the 21st century.

== Plot ==
Stage actor and director Yūsuke Kafuku lives in Tokyo with his wife Oto, a screenwriter who conceives her stories after sex and narrates them to him. He learns his lines by listening to tapes recorded by Oto, while driving his red Aero performance variant of Saab 900 Turbo. After Yūsuke performs in Waiting for Godot, Oto introduces him to young television star Kōji Takatsuki. When a theater festival Yūsuke was slated to judge in is delayed, he returns home, where he finds his wife having sex with Kōji, but does not disturb them. After a car crash, Yūsuke discovers he has glaucoma in one eye and must take eyedrops to prevent blindness. One day, Oto asks to have a serious conversation with Yūsuke. After he spends the day driving alone, Yūsuke returns home to find Oto dead from a brain hemorrhage. After the funeral, Yūsuke breaks down while performing the title role in Uncle Vanya.

Two years later, Yūsuke accepts a residency in Hiroshima to direct a multilingual production of Uncle Vanya. The theatre festival requires that he be chauffeured in his own car for insurance reasons, and despite his initial reluctance, he eventually bonds with his reserved young driver, Misaki Watari. With the help of dramaturge Gong Yoon-su, Yūsuke casts a diverse group of actors to perform in their native languages. He is impressed by Lee Yoo-na, a mute actress who communicates in Korean Sign Language, and he also unexpectedly casts Kōji as Uncle Vanya.

After a rehearsal, Kōji invites Yūsuke for a drink, where the young actor pushes against harsh assessments of his character but admits to his unrequited love for Oto. He scolds someone for taking a photo of him. Yoon-su invites Yūsuke and Misaki to dinner with his wife, who is revealed to be Yoo-na. Driving home, Misaki tells Yūsuke about driving her abusive mother for long hours at a young age. They later visit a garbage facility, where Misaki explains that she drove garbage trucks after leaving her hometown when a landslide destroyed her home and killed her mother.

Drinking with Kōji again, Yūsuke reveals that he thinks he can no longer play Vanya himself, and suggests that Kōji's lack of self-control is a personal weakness but a strength as an actor. After Kōji slips away to confront a man taking photos of him, Misaki drives them home. Yūsuke reveals that he and Oto lost their young daughter, who would now be Misaki's age; Oto's gift for telling stories after sex was a bond that helped them both cope. Though he knew of his wife's affairs, Yūsuke believes she still loved him, and Kōji shares one of Oto's stories that Yūsuke never heard in its entirety.

The police interrupt a rehearsal and arrest Kōji, as the man he attacked has died from his injuries. Given two days to consider whether to take over as Vanya or else cancel the production, Yūsuke asks Misaki to take him to her childhood home in Hokkaido. Yūsuke shares his guilt for not coming home to face the discussion Oto wanted to have, which might have allowed him to save her life. Misaki reveals that she escaped the landslide but chose not to pull her mother from the wreckage, receiving a scar on her cheek she has chosen not to have treated. They visit the snowy remains of Misaki's childhood home and hug as they both confront their shared grief.

Yūsuke assumes the role of Vanya and gives an impassioned performance before a live audience, including Misaki. Yoo-na meaningfully delivers Sonya's final lines: "We shall hear the angels, we shall see the whole sky all in diamonds, we shall see how all earthly evil, all our sufferings, are drowned in the mercy that will fill the whole world. And our life will grow peaceful, tender, sweet as a caress… You've had no joy in your life; but wait, Uncle Vanya, wait… We shall rest." Actors and audience alike are moved by the performance.

Some time later, Misaki is living in South Korea. Buying groceries, she returns to Yūsuke's red Saab, in which a dog rests. She takes off her surgical mask, revealing that her scar is now barely visible, and drives away.

== Cast ==
- Hidetoshi Nishijima as Yūsuke Kafuku
- Tōko Miura as Misaki Watari
- Reika Kirishima as Oto Kafuku, Yusuke's wife
- Park Yu-rim as Lee Yoo-na
- Jin Dae-yeon as Gong Yoon-soo
- Sonia Yuan as Janice Chang
- Ahn Hwitae as Ryu Jeong-eui
- Perry Dizon as Roy Lucelo
- Satoko Abe as Yuhara
- Masaki Okada as Kōji Takatsuki

== Production ==
The film is directed by Ryusuke Hamaguchi. The film was originally set in Busan, South Korea, but was changed to Hiroshima due to the COVID-19 pandemic.

=== Writing ===
Hamaguchi was the co-writer of the filmscript with Takamasa Oe. It is primarily based on "Drive My Car" by Haruki Murakami from his 2014 short story collection, Men Without Women. The script also features elements from Murakami's stories "Scheherazade" and "Kino" (both also part of Men Without Women). For the film version, the co-authors were reported by The New York Times to have "greatly expanded on the (short) story's central dynamic, which turns on a sexist widowed actor and the much-younger female driver who motors him around in his cherished Saab."

=== Cinematography ===
Cinematographer Hidetoshi Shinomiya was assigned to do the filming for the project.

=== Set design ===
The original story features a yellow Saab 900 convertible, but it was changed in the film to a red Saab 900 Turbo to visually complement the Hiroshima landscape.

== Soundtrack ==
The original score for Drive My Car was composed by musician Eiko Ishibashi. In an interview with Variety, director Hamaguchi said; "Typically, I don't use a lot of music in my films, but hearing the music Ishibashi made was the first time I thought this could work for the film." The soundtrack consists of 12 tracks.

Hamaguchi wished to incorporate the Beatles' song "Drive My Car", which the film and story are named after. However, it was too difficult to get permission for its usage. He instead included a string quartet piece by Beethoven, which is directly referenced in Murakami's original story.

Writing for Pitchfork, Quinn Moreland wrote that the soundtrack "possesses a cool remove, mirroring the film's glacial profundity with organic nuance and contemplative improvisation." Vanessa Ague of The Quietus wrote; "Ishibashi creates a narrative within the theme and variations, tracing a musical path that stands on its own." Writing for PopMatters, Jay Honeycomb wrote; "Ishibashi's music washes over you when it comes, allowing the seeds planted by Hamaguchi to germinate and grow without drowning you in sentimentality."

Drive My Car Original Soundtrack

Soundtrack album by Eiko Ishibashi
- Released: January 7, 2022
- Studios: Hoshi to Nijii Recording Studio, Atelier Eiko, Steamroom
- Genres: Jazz, Pop
- Length: 46:44
- Labels: Newhere, Space Shower

Professional ratings
Review scores
Source	Rating
Pitchfork	8.0/10
The Quietus	Favourable

No.	Title	Length
1.	"Drive My Car"	5:04
2.	"Drive My Car (Misaki)"	2:27
3.	"Drive My Car (Cassette)"	2:55
4.	"Drive My Car (The Important Thing Is to Work)"	3:08
5.	"We'll Live Through the Long, Long Days, and Through the Long Nights"	3:56
6.	"We'll Live Through the Long, Long Days, and Through the Long Nights (SAAB 900)"	4:53
7.	"We'll Live Through the Long, Long Days, and Through the Long Nights (Oto)"	5:19
8.	"Drive My Car (Kafuku)"	3:39
9.	"Drive My Car (The Truth, No Matter What It Is, Isn't That Frightening)"	2:07
10.	"We'll Live Through the Long, Long Days, and Through the Long Nights (And When Our Last Hour Comes We'll Go Quietly)"	5:01
11.	"Drive My Car (Hiroshima)"	2:47
12.	"We'll Live Through the Long, Long Days, and Through the Long Nights (Different Ways)"	5:23
Total length:		46:44

=== Music personnel ===
- Eiko Ishibashi : Piano, Rhodes, Synth, Flutes, Electronics, Melodion, Vibraphone
- Jim O'Rourke : A.Guitar, E.Guitar, Pedal Steel, Guitar, Bass, Vibraphone
- Tatsuhisa Yamamoto : Drums, Percussion
- Marty Holoubek : A.Bass, E.Bass (Track 1,2,4,8)
- Toshiaki Sudoh : E. Bass (Track 5,10)
- Atsuko Hatano : Violin, Viola

== Release and reception ==
Drive My Car had its world premiere at the 2021 Cannes Film Festival in competition for the Palme d'Or. It was released in United Kingdom on 19 November 2021 and on 24 November 2021 in the United States.

In 2025, the film was showcased in the section 'Decisive Moments in Asian Cinema' at the 30th Busan International Film Festival, as part of the special "Asian Cinema 100", being the signature work of the director Ryusuke Hamaguchi.

=== Home media ===
The DVD and Blu-ray versions of the film were released in the United States on July 19, 2022, as part of The Criterion Collection.

=== Box office ===
As of 8 April 2022, Drive My Car has grossed $2.3 million in the United States and Canada, and $12.3 million in other territories, for a worldwide total of $14.7 million.

In the United States, the film had grossed $944,000 at the time of its Oscar nominations on February 8, 2022. Between then and March 20, it grossed $1.15 million (a 122% increase), for a running total of $2.1 million.

=== Critical response ===
On Rotten Tomatoes, the film holds an approval rating of 97% based on 217 reviews, with an average rating of 8.7/10. The website's critical consensus reads, "Drive My Car's imposing runtime holds a rich, patiently engrossing drama that reckons with self-acceptance and regret." According to Metacritic, which assigned a weighted average score of 91 out of 100 based on 42 critics, the film received "universal acclaim".

The film received a positive review from Manohla Dargis in The New York Times, where she wrote, "Drive My Car sneaks up on you, lulling you in with visuals that are as straightforward as the narrative is complex." Writing for The Guardian, Peter Bradshaw gave the film five stars out of five and called it an "engrossing and exalting experience".

Carlos Aguilar found the cinematography of the film to be exceptional, stating that: "Bountiful in subtle imagery from cinematographer Hidetoshi Shinomiya, the film mines majestic visual symbolism from seemingly ordinary occurrences. Take for example a shot of Yūsuke and Misaki's hand through the car's sunroof holding cigarettes as to not let the smoke permeate their sacred mode of transportation—an unspoken communion of respect."

Justin Chang described it as "a masterpiece" that is "Perfectly paced, intricately structured and entirely absorbing". He credits "the elusive magic" that transpires between the film's two primary actors, Hidetoshi Nishijima and Tōko Miura, and "how acting can achieve the force of real life, and how real life requires a measure of acting."

Metacritic reported that Drive My Car appeared on over 89 film critics' top-ten lists for 2021, the most of any foreign-language film that year, and ranked first or second on 23 lists.

In 2023, it ranked number 19 on The Hollywood Reporter's list of the "50 Best Films of the 21st Century (So Far)." Comic Book Resources ranked it at number 2 on its list of the "10 Best Indie Films of the 2020s (So Far)," calling it "one of those films where audiences are happy to watch a heartbreaking story because the experience is extraordinary." It ranked number 5 on Collider's list of "The 20 Best Drama Movies of the 2020s So Far," writing that "Hamaguchi crafted a timeless examination of loss; while it’s initially a tough premise to sit through, Drive My Car becomes rewarding for those that invest in its message about the necessity of healing. The film reminds the viewer that moving forward after the death of a loved one is a difficult, but necessary task." In June 2025, IndieWire ranked the film at number 9 on its list of "The 100 Best Movies of the 2020s (So Far)." In July 2025, the film ranked number 89 on the "Readers' Choice" edition of The New York Times' list of "The 100 Best Movies of the 21st Century" and number 28 on Rolling Stone's list of "The 100 Best Movies of the 21st Century."

=== Accolades ===
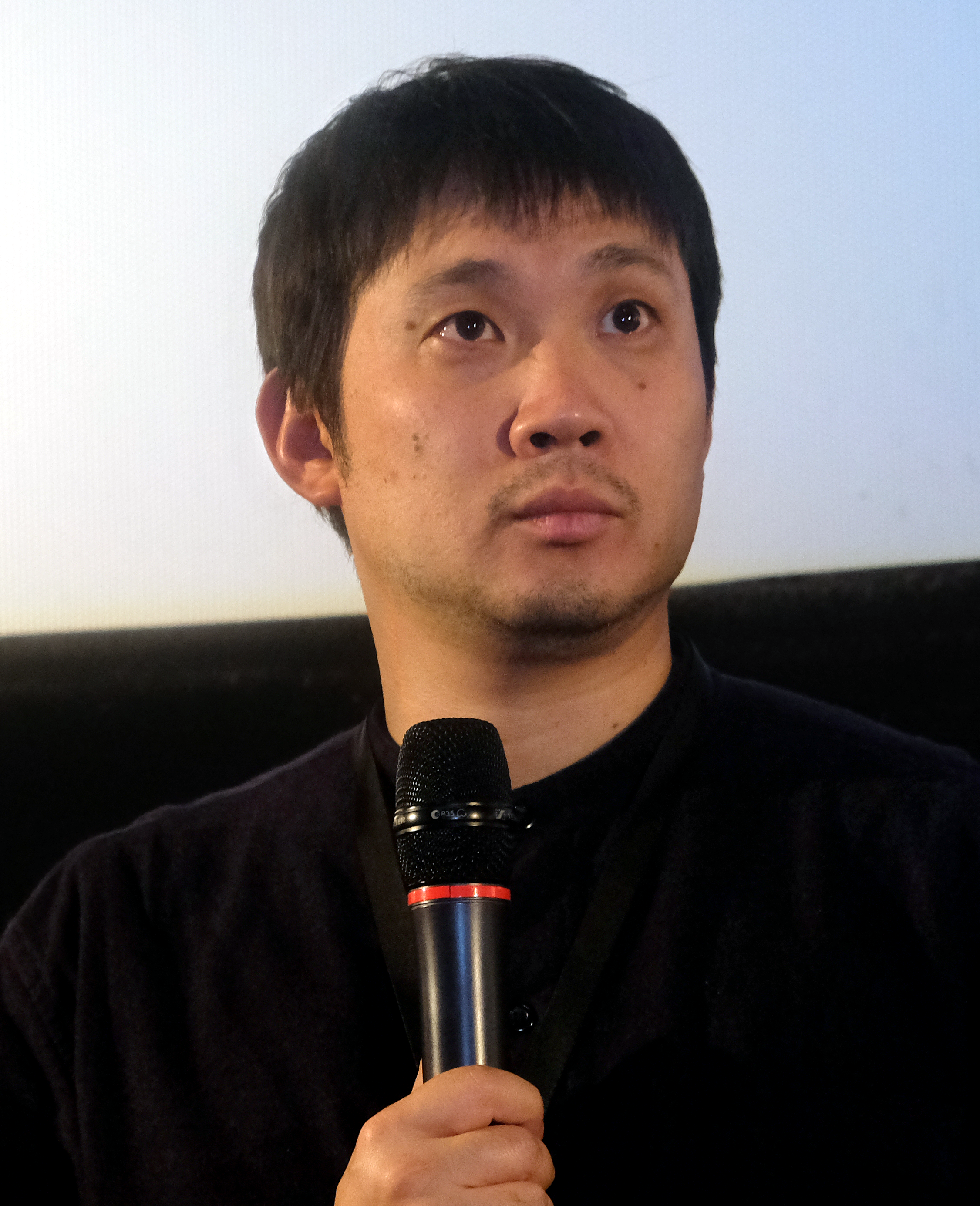
Ryusuke Hamaguchi was nominated for the Academy Award for Best Director.

The film was selected to compete for the Palme d'Or at the 2021 Cannes Film Festival where it won three awards including Best Screenplay. Hamaguchi and Oe became the first Japanese individuals to win the Best Screenplay Award at Cannes. At the 79th Golden Globe Awards, the film won Best Foreign Language Film.

It was picked as the Japanese entry for the Best International Feature Film at the 94th Academy Awards, making the December 2021 shortlist. It was nominated for four Academy Awards, including Best Picture, Best Director for Hamaguchi, Best Adapted Screenplay for Hamaguchi and co-screenwriter Takamasa Oe, and Best International Feature Film, winning the latter award. It was the first Japanese film to receive a Best Picture nomination, and Hamaguchi became the third Japanese director nominated for Best Director since Hiroshi Teshigahara in 1965 and Akira Kurosawa in 1985.

It became one of only seven films (and the first non-English-language film) to win Best Picture from all three major U.S. critics groups (LAFCA, NYFCC, NSFC), the other six being Goodfellas, Schindler's List, L.A. Confidential, The Social Network, The Hurt Locker, and Tár.

== See also ==
- List of submissions to the 94th Academy Awards for Best International Feature Film
- List of Japanese submissions for the Academy Award for Best International Feature Film
- Road movie
