= Takamasa Oe =

Japanese screenwriter

- Born: 6 January 1981 (age 45); Osaka Prefecture, Japan
- Occupation: Screenwriter

Takamasa Oe (大江 崇允, Ōe Takamasa; born 6 January 1981) is a Japanese screenwriter. He was co-nominated with Ryusuke Hamaguchi for an Academy Award in the category Best Adapted Screenplay for the film Drive My Car.

== Selected filmography ==
- Drive My Car (2021; co-nominated with Ryusuke Hamaguchi)
- Gannibal (2022)
- Dragons of Wonderhatch (2023)
- Hina Is Beautiful (2023)
- Whale Bones (2023)

== See also ==
- List of Academy Award winners and nominees of Asian descent
- List of Academy Award winners and nominees from Japan
