= Ryusuke Hamaguchi =

Japanese filmmaker (born 1978)

- 濱口 竜介
- Hamaguchi in 2026.
- Born: 16 December 1978 (age 47); Kawasaki, Kanagawa, Japan
- Education: University of Tokyo; Tokyo National University of Fine Arts and Music (M.A.)
- Occupations: Film director; screenwriter
- Years active: 2001–present

Japanese name
- Romanization: Hamaguchi Ryūsuke

Ryusuke Hamaguchi (濱口 竜介, Hamaguchi Ryūsuke; [hamaꜜɡɯtɕi ɾʲɯꜜːsɯ̥ke]; born 16 December 1978) is a Japanese filmmaker. An alumnus of the University of Tokyo and Tokyo National University of Fine Arts and Music, he first gained international recognition for Happy Hour (2015), Asako I & II (2018) and Wheel of Fortune and Fantasy (2021), which premiered in the main competitions of Locarno, Cannes, and Berlin respectively.

For Drive My Car (2021), Hamaguchi was nominated at the 94th Academy Awards for Best Director and Best Adapted Screenplay; the film was the first Japanese production to be nominated for Best Picture, and it won the Academy Award for Best International Feature Film. Following Drive My Car, Hamaguchi wrote and directed the critically acclaimed films Evil Does Not Exist (2023), which won the Grand Jury Prize at Venice, and All of a Sudden (2026), which won the award for Best Actress at Cannes.

== Career ==
Hamaguchi was born on December 16, 1978, in Kawasaki City in Japan. His father was an official at Japan’s Ministry of Construction, and he lived in Iran between the ages of 3 and 5 because of his father's job transfers.

When he entered the University of Tokyo, he had no particular interest in film and was entirely unaware that Shigehiko Hasumi, who was then serving as the university’s president, was also a prominent film critic. Hamaguchi had no contact with Hasumi until he himself gained international recognition. While at the university, he became deeply involved in film through its cinema club and made several 8 mm films, including Like Nothing Happened and SOLARIS.

=== 2000s ===
After graduating from the University of Tokyo, Hamaguchi worked in the commercial film industry for a few years before entering the graduate program in film at Tokyo University of the Arts where he studied with and was influenced by Kiyoshi Kurosawa.

In 2007, he directed Solaris, an unauthorized version of Stanisław Lem's novel of same name, during his first year as a graduation student at the Tokyo University of the Arts, the film had a considerable budget for a graduation project, ¥4 million. Since the production failed to gain the novel rights, the resulting 90-minute was never released.

His second graduation film, Passion (2008) was selected for the competition of the Tokyo Filmex.

=== 2010s ===
Alongside Kō Sakai, Hamaguchi directed a three-part documentary about survivors of the 2011 Tōhoku earthquake and tsunami. Voices from the Waves was selected for the competition at the 2013 Yamagata International Documentary Film Festival. The duo also directed Storytellers, which won the Sky Perfect IDEHA Prize.

His 5-hour-long drama film Happy Hour (2015), marked his first film selected to a major western film festival, premiered at the Golden Leopard competition of the 2015 Locarno Film Festival and won the Best Actress award for its four lead actresses alongside a Special Mention for its script. It was also given the Special Jury award at the 2016 Japan Movie Critic Awards, and the Best Newcomer award of the Agency for Cultural Affairs' Geijutsu Sensho Awards that year. Hamaguchi first developed the screenplay while he was an artist in residence at KIITO Design and Creative Center Kobe in 2013. It came out of an improvisational acting workshop he held for non-professionals, with many of the film's performers having participated in the workshop.

He followed with Asako I & II (2018), which marked his first entry at the Cannes Film Festival, directly into the main competition for the Palme d'Or. Based on the 2010 novel by Tomoka Shibasaki, it follows a woman who falls in love with two men who look the same but act completely differently. It received positive reviews, establishing his career in the west.

=== 2020s ===
His anthology film Wheel of Fortune and Fantasy (2021), delayed by the COVID-19 pandemic, was selected to the main competition of the 71st Berlin International Film Festival where it won Silver Bear Grand Jury Prize (2nd place). It received critical acclaim.

Drive My Car (also 2021), premiered at the main competition of the 74th Cannes Film Festival where it won the Best Screenplay award. It also received critical acclaim, winning numerous awards, including: Best Picture prizes from the New York Film Critics Circle, Boston Society of Film Critics, and Los Angeles Film Critics Association, and a Golden Globe Award for Best Non-English Language Film. At the 94th Academy Awards, the film won Best International Feature Film and Hamaguchi was nominated for Best Adapted Screenplay and Best Director, for the latter he became the third Japanese director nominated.

Hamaguchi at the 2026 Cannes Film Festival

His Evil Does Not Exist (2023), premiered at the main competition of the 80th Venice International Film Festival, where it won the Grand Jury Prize (2nd place). The film received critical acclaim. That same year, he released the short film Gift, which uses the same footage as Evil Does Not Exist (though with a different story) and is accompanied by a live score by Eiko Ishibashi.

His French language debut All of a Sudden (2026), had its world premiere at the main competition of the 79th Cannes Film Festival, where its stars Virginie Efira and Tao Okamoto won the Best Actress prize. It received critical acclaim.

== Influences and style ==
Hamaguchi has referred to himself as "purely a cinephile" and "conventionally in love with Hollywood films." He has been influenced by the works of John Cassavetes.

In April 2024, he listed his 50 favorite films for LaCinetek. His selection explores various cinema genres and periods, including works from directors such as Robert Bresson, Clint Eastwood, Howard Hawks, Edward Yang, Kenji Mizoguchi and Robert Zemeckis.

=== Quotes ===
- "To some extent, all films are fiction and documentary at the same time. I have experienced to make both, and I believe there is no such thing as pure fiction or pure documentary."
- "The actor is acting in front of the camera. What the camera captures there is a documentary about the actors, because they're doing something which happens only once."
- (On the multilingual staging in Drive My Car) "In a multilingual staging, of course, they're not understanding the meaning of the words. Instead, the body language and the voice tones is what becomes more important to convey those feelings or the emotional state of the respective actors. It becomes easier to focus and react. That's a nice way I look at it to get a more simple and strong performance."
- (On the ending of Drive My Car) "Once I talked with a big fan of Drive My Car who said that it really would have been perfect without that ending. (Laugh) Well, I think maybe the reason I ended that way is to make it a bit imperfect." "In terms of the final staging of the play in applause, if I had ended the movie at that point, presumably the audience would want to do a round of applause, and it would almost be like closing of a full circle. But for me that didn't really feel like a satisfying ending. I wanted to do something a bit more disruptive, to leave some sort of break."
- (On the ending of Drive My Car) "I have no any plans of making a sequel, but I was just sort of playing around with things at the end there. One other thing I'd like to say is that the title itself also might give a clue to how you can interpret the ending."

== Personal life ==
=== Political views ===
In December 2023, alongside 50 other filmmakers, Hamaguchi signed an open letter published in Libération demanding a ceasefire and an end to the killing of civilians amid the 2023 Israeli invasion of the Gaza Strip, and for a humanitarian corridor into Gaza to be established for humanitarian aid, and the release of hostages.

== Filmography ==
=== Feature films ===
Year	English title	Original title	Notes
2003	Like Nothing Happened	何食わぬ顔	
2007	Solaris		
2008	Passion		Graduation work at Tokyo University of the Arts
2010	The Depths	심도	Co-written with Kôta Ôura; Korean-language debut
2013	Intimacies	親密さ	
2015	Happy Hour	ハッピーアワー	Co-written with Tadashi Nohara and Tomoyuki Takahashi
2018	Asako I & II	寝ても覚めても	Co-written with Sachiko Tanaka
2021	Wheel of Fortune and Fantasy	偶然と想像	
2021	Drive My Car	ドライブ・マイ・カー	Co-written with Takamasa Oe
2023	Evil Does Not Exist	悪は存在しない	
2026	All of a Sudden	急に具合が悪くなる	Co-written with Léa Le Dimna; French-language debut

==== Only writer ====
Year	English title	Original title	Notes
2020	Wife of a Spy	スパイの妻	Directed by Kiyoshi Kurosawa

=== Documentaries ===
Year	English title	Original title	Notes
2011	The Sound of the Waves	東北記録映画三部作 なみのおと	Co-directed by Kō Sakai
2013	Voices from the Waves - Kesennuma	東北記録映画三部作 なみのこえ 気仙沼	Co-directed by Kō Sakai
2013	Voices from the Waves - Shinchi-machi	東北記録映画三部作 なみのこえ 新地町	Co-directed by Kō Sakai
2013	Storytellers	東北記録映画三部作 うたうひと	Co-directed by Kō Sakai

=== Short films ===
Year	English Title	Original title	Notes
2001	Go to the Movies	映画を見に行く	
2003	Like Nothing Happened	何食わぬ顔	
2005	The Beginning	はじまり	
2005	Friend of the Night		
2006	Scent of Memory	記憶の香り	
2006	Attack	遊撃	
2009	I Love Thee For Good	永遠に君を愛す	
2013	Touching the Skin of Eeriness	不気味なものの肌に触れる	
2016	Heaven Is Still Far Away	天国はまだ遠い	
2023	Gift	ギフト	Created to accompany Eiko Ishibashi's new album

== Awards and nominations ==
Year	Award	Category	Nominated work	Result	Ref
2015	Nantes Three Continents Festival	Le prix du public	Happy Hour	Won	
2021	Berlin International Film Festival	Silver Bear Grand Jury Prize	Wheel of Fortune and Fantasy	Won	
2021	Cannes Film Festival	Palme d'Or	Drive My Car	Nominated	
2021	Cannes Film Festival	Best Screenplay	Drive My Car	Won	
2021	Cannes Film Festival	FIPRESCI Prize	Drive My Car	Won	
2021	Cannes Film Festival	Prize of the Ecumenical Jury	Drive My Car	Won	
2021	New York Film Critics Circle	Best Picture	Drive My Car	Won	
2021	Washington D.C. Area Film Critics Association	Best International / Foreign Language Film	Drive My Car	Won	
2021	Boston Society of Film Critics	Best Film	Drive My Car	Won	
2021	Boston Society of Film Critics	Best Director	Drive My Car	Won	
2021	Boston Society of Film Critics	Best Screenplay	Drive My Car	Won	
2021	Los Angeles Film Critics Association	Best Picture	Drive My Car	Won	
2021	Los Angeles Film Critics Association	Best Screenplay	Drive My Car	Won	
2022	Academy Awards	Best Adapted Screenplay	Drive My Car	Nominated	
2022	Academy Awards	Best Director	Drive My Car	Nominated	
2022	Academy Awards	Best International Feature Film	Drive My Car	Won	
2022	National Society of Film Critics Awards	Best Film	Drive My Car	Won	
2022	National Society of Film Critics Awards	Best Director	Drive My Car	Won	
2022	National Society of Film Critics Awards	Best Screenplay	Drive My Car	Won	
2023	Asian Film Awards	Best Director	Drive My Car	Nominated	
2023	Venice International Film Festival	Golden Lion	Evil Does Not Exist	Nominated	
2023	Venice International Film Festival	Grand Jury Prize	Evil Does Not Exist	Won	
2023	Venice International Film Festival	Premio CinemaSarà - Special Mention	Evil Does Not Exist	Won	
2023	Venice International Film Festival	Edipo Re Award - Ca'Foscari Young Jury Award	Evil Does Not Exist	Won	
2023	Venice International Film Festival	Premio Fondazione Fai Persona Lavoro Ambiente	Evil Does Not Exist	Won	
2023	Venice International Film Festival	FIPRESCI Award	Evil Does Not Exist	Won	
2026	Asia Pacific Screen Awards	Best Film	All of a Sudden	Nominated	
2026	Asia Pacific Screen Awards	Best Director	All of a Sudden	Nominated	
2026	British Independent Film Awards	Best International Independent Film	All of a Sudden	Pending	
2026	Cannes Film Festival	Palme d'Or	All of a Sudden	Nominated	
2026	Chicago International Film Festival	Best Screenplay	All of a Sudden	Won	
2026	Denver Film Festival	Krzysztof Kieslowski Award for Best Feature Film	All of a Sudden	Nominated	
2026	Gotham Independent Film Awards	Best International Feature	All of a Sudden	Pending	
2026	Gotham Independent Film Awards	Best Director	All of a Sudden	Pending	
2026	Gotham Independent Film Awards	Best Adapted Screenplay	All of a Sudden	Pending	
2026	Montclair Film Festival	Best of World Cinema	All of a Sudden	Won	
2026	San Sebastián International Film Festival	RTVE Another Look Award	All of a Sudden	Won	

== See also ==
- List of Academy Award winners and nominees of Asian descent
- List of Academy Award winners and nominees from Japan
