= Austin Film Critics Association Awards 2021 =

Film awards edition

17th Austin Film Critics Association Awards
- Date: January 11, 2022
- Location: Austin, Texas
- Presented by: Austin Film Critics Association
- Website: austinfilmcritics.org

The 17th Austin Film Critics Association Awards, honoring the best in filmmaking for 2021, were announced on January 11, 2022. The nominations were announced on January 4, 2022.

The Power of the Dog led the nominations with nine and also received the most awards with five wins, including Best Film.

== Winners and nominees ==
The winners are listed first and in bold.

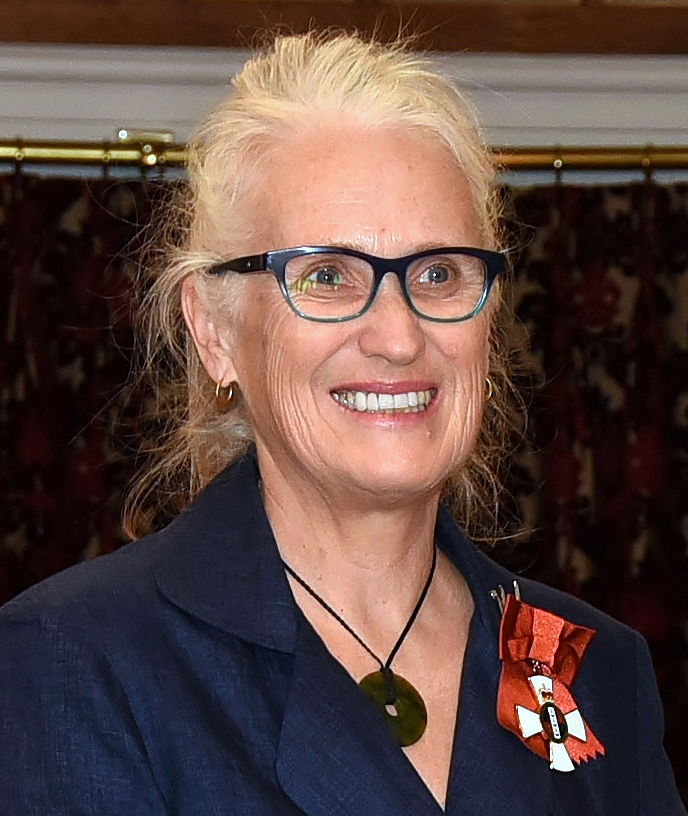
Jane Campion, Best Director winner

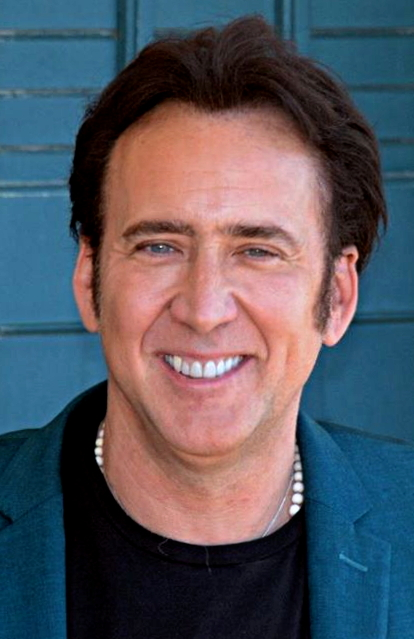
Nicolas Cage, Best Actor winner

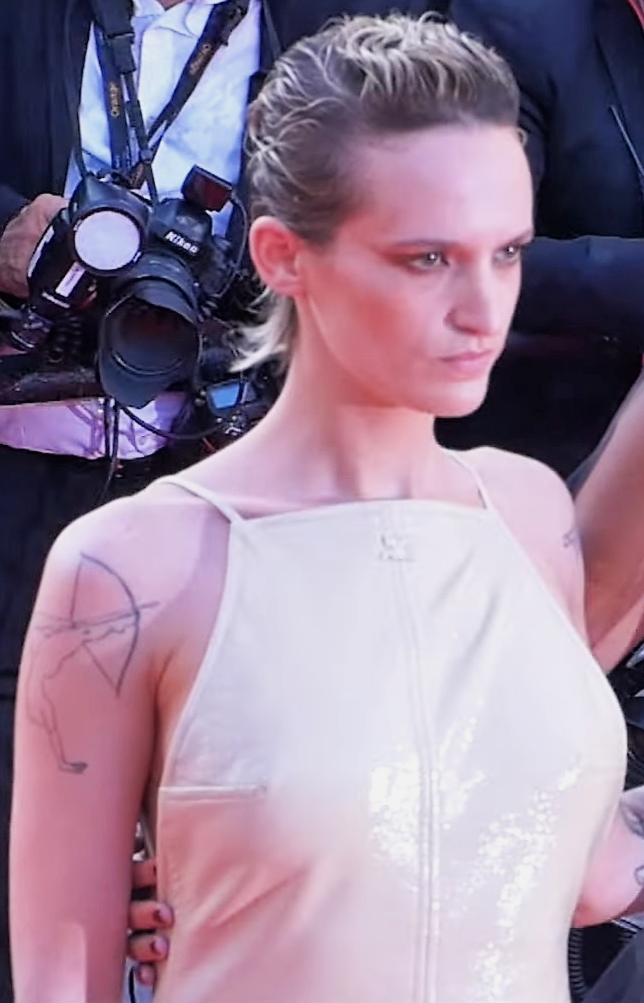
Agathe Rousselle, Best Actress winner

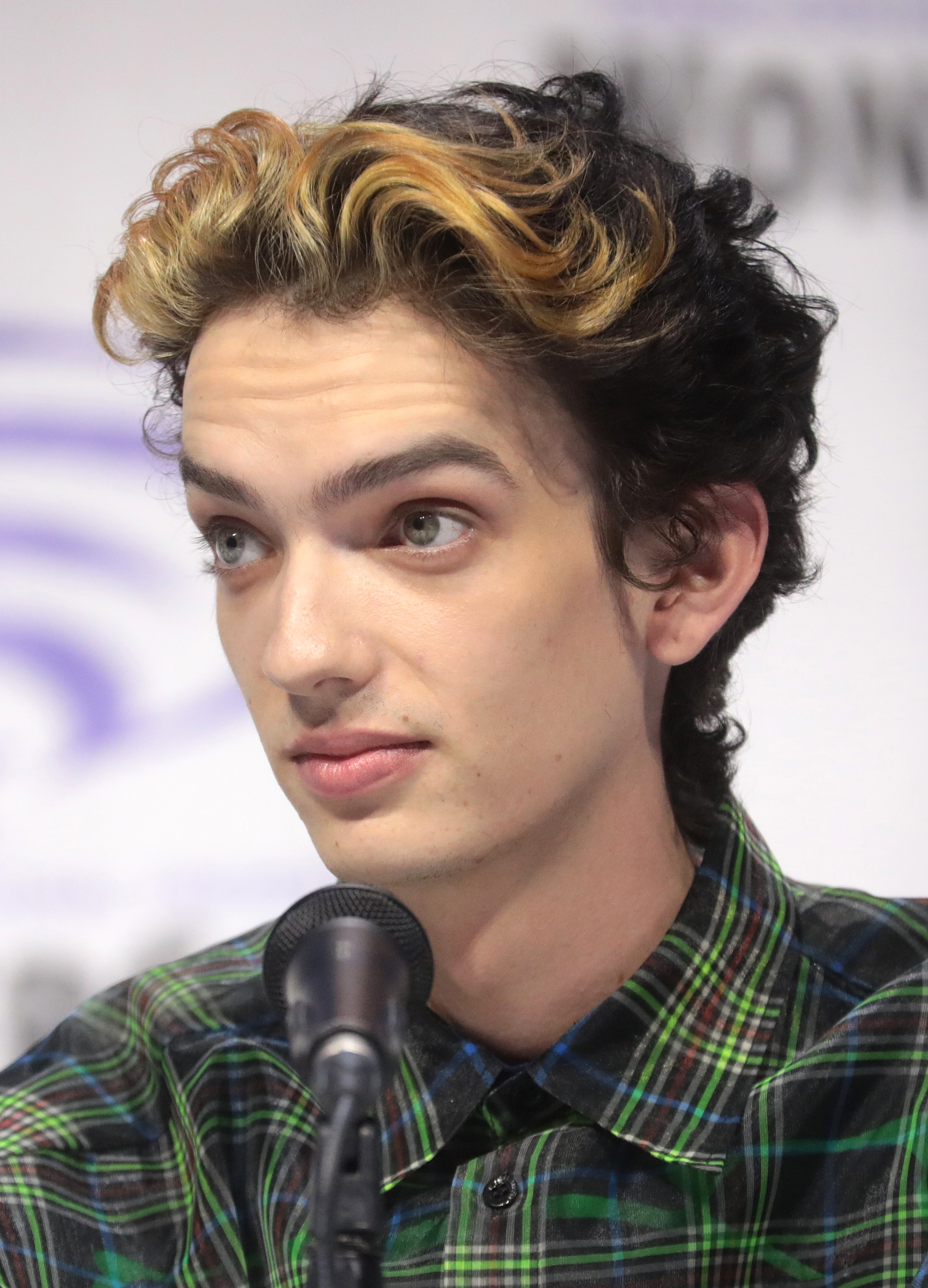
Kodi Smit-McPhee, Best Supporting Actor winner

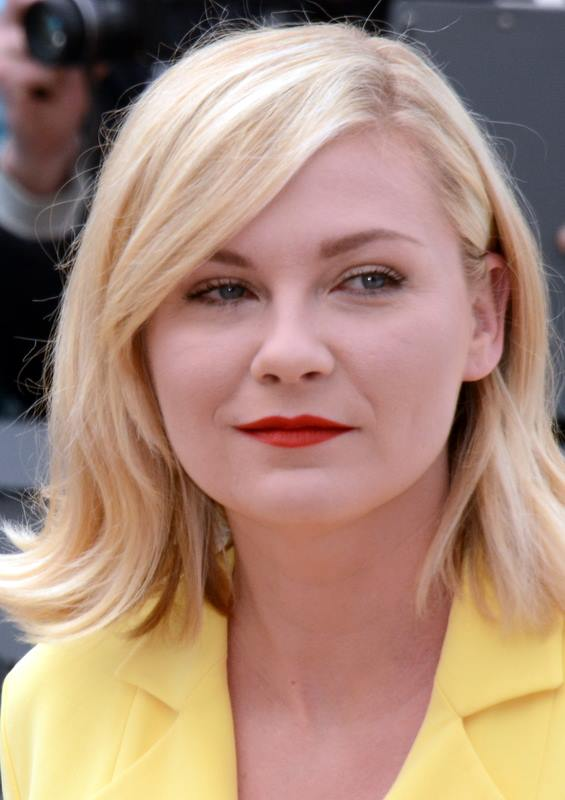
Kirsten Dunst, Best Supporting Actress winner

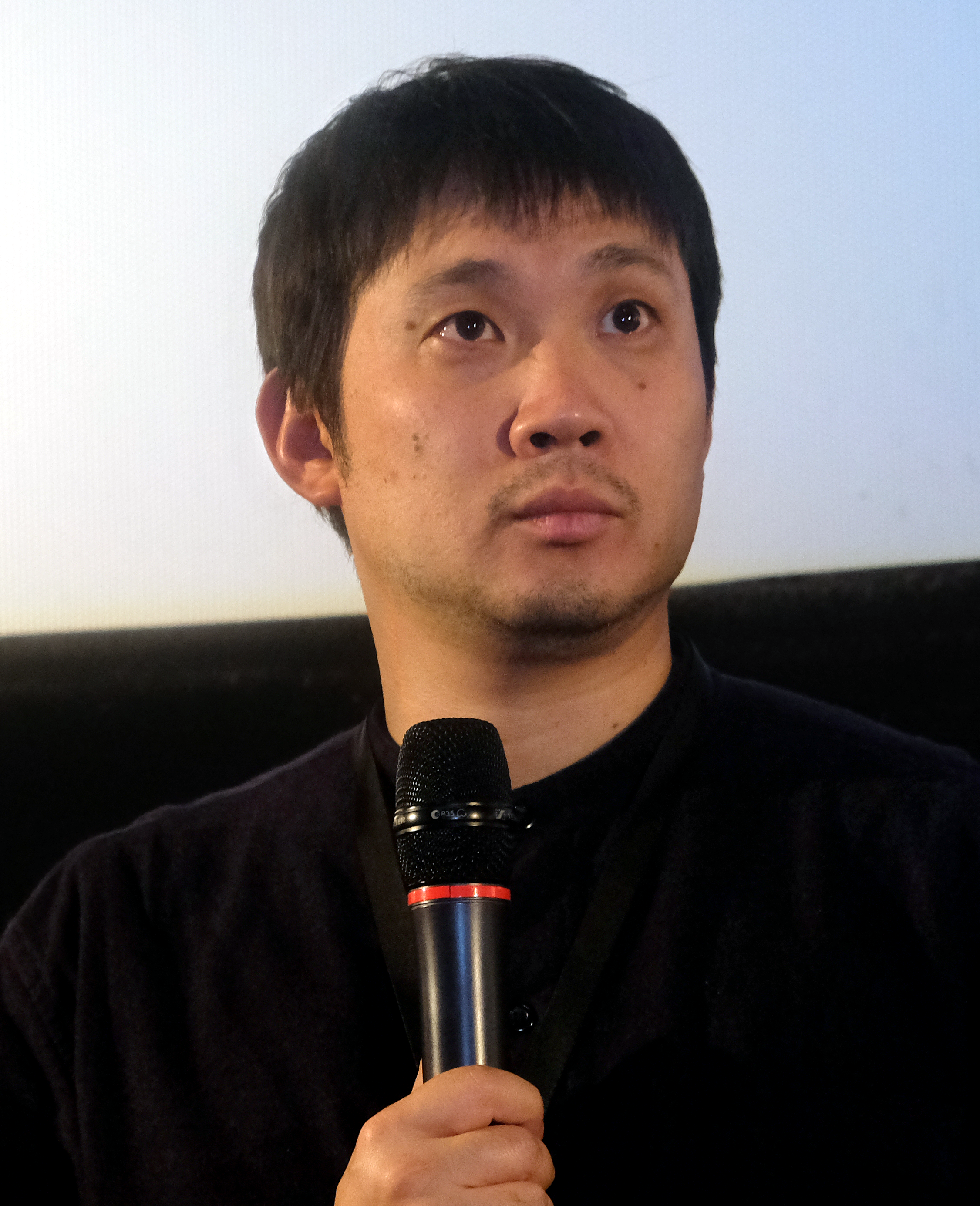
Ryusuke Hamaguchi, Best Adapted Screenplay co-winner

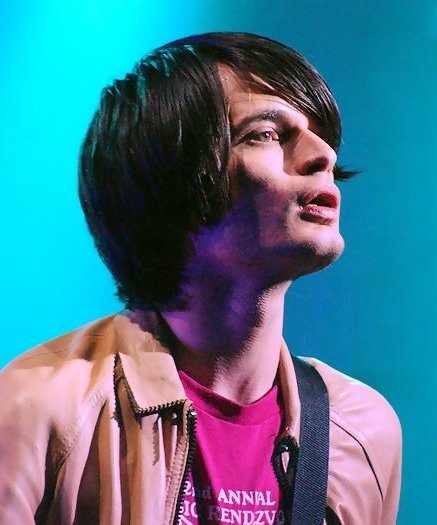
Jonny Greenwood, Best Score winner

Best Film	Best Director
**The Power of the Dog**; Dune; The Green Knight; Licorice Pizza; Pig	**Jane Campion – The Power of the Dog**; Paul Thomas Anderson – Licorice Pizza; Ryusuke Hamaguchi – Drive My Car; David Lowery – The Green Knight; Denis Villeneuve – Dune
Best Actor	Best Actress
**Nicolas Cage – Pig as Robin "Rob" Feld**; Benedict Cumberbatch – The Power of the Dog as Phil Burbank; Andrew Garfield – tick, tick... BOOM! as Jonathan Larson; Simon Rex – Red Rocket as Mikey Saber; Denzel Washington – The Tragedy of Macbeth as Lord Macbeth	**Agathe Rousselle – Titane as Alexia / Adrien**; Olivia Colman – The Lost Daughter as Leda Caruso; Penélope Cruz – Parallel Mothers as Janis Martinez; Alana Haim – Licorice Pizza as Alana Kane; Kristen Stewart – Spencer as Diana, Princess of Wales
Best Supporting Actor	Best Supporting Actress
**Kodi Smit-McPhee – The Power of the Dog as Peter Gordon**; Bradley Cooper – Licorice Pizza as Jon Peters; Colman Domingo – Zola as Abegunde "X" Olawale; Vincent Lindon – Titane as Vincent; Jeffrey Wright – The French Dispatch as Roebuck Wright	**Kirsten Dunst – The Power of the Dog as Rose Gordon**; Ariana DeBose – West Side Story as Anita; Ann Dowd – Mass as Linda; Kathryn Hunter – The Tragedy of Macbeth as Witches / Old Man; Ruth Negga – Passing as Clare Bellew
Best Original Screenplay	Best Adapted Screenplay
**Vanessa Block and Michael Sarnoski – Pig**; Paul Thomas Anderson – Licorice Pizza; Wes Anderson – The French Dispatch; Fran Kranz – Mass; Mike Mills – C'mon C'mon	**Ryusuke Hamaguchi and Takamasa Oe – Drive My Car**; Jane Campion – The Power of the Dog; Sian Heder – CODA; David Lowery – The Green Knight; Eric Roth, Jon Spaihts, and Denis Villeneuve – Dune
Best Animated Film	Best Documentary
**The Mitchells vs. the Machines**; Belle; Encanto; Flee; Luca	**Summer of Soul (...Or, When the Revolution Could Not Be Televised)**; Flee; The Rescue; The Sparks Brothers; The Velvet Underground
Best International Film	Best First Film
**Drive My Car**; Lamb; Parallel Mothers; Titane; The Worst Person in the World	**Michael Sarnoski – Pig**; Maggie Gyllenhaal – The Lost Daughter; Rebecca Hall – Passing; Fran Kranz – Mass; Emma Seligman – Shiva Baby
Best Cinematography	Best Editing
**Andrew Droz Palermo – The Green Knight**; Bruno Delbonnel – The Tragedy of Macbeth; Greig Fraser – Dune; Janusz Kamiński – West Side Story; Ari Wegner – The Power of the Dog	**Joe Walker – Dune**; Andy Jurgensen – Licorice Pizza; Michael Kahn and Sarah Broshar – West Side Story; Peter Sciberras – The Power of the Dog; Claire Simpson – The Last Duel
Best Score	Best Ensemble
**Jonny Greenwood – The Power of the Dog**; Jonny Greenwood – Spencer; Daniel Hart – The Green Knight; Robert Aiki Aubrey Lowe – Candyman; Hans Zimmer – Dune	**The French Dispatch**; Dune; The Harder they Fall; Licorice Pizza; Mass
Best Stunts	Best Voice Acting/Animated/Digital Performance
**No Time to Die**; Dune; Raging Fire; Shang-Chi and the Legend of the Ten Rings; Spider-Man: No Way Home	**Abbi Jacobson – The Mitchells vs. the Machines as Katie Mitchell**; Stephanie Beatriz – Encanto as Mirabel Madrigal; John Leguizamo – Encanto as Bruno Madrigal; Danny McBride – The Mitchells vs. the Machines as Rick Mitchell; Kaho Nakamura – Belle as Suzu Naito / Belle
The Robert R. "Bobby" McCurdy Memorial Breakthrough Artist Award	Best Austin Film 2021
**Alana Haim – Licorice Pizza**; Ariana DeBose – West Side Story; Emilia Jones – CODA; Agathe Rousselle – Titane; Rachel Sennott – Shiva Baby	**Without Getting Killed or Caught (dirs. Tamara Saviano and Paul Whitfield)**; The Carnivores (dir. Caleb Michael Johnson); The Get Together (dir. Will Bakke); Happier Than Ever: A Love Letter to Los Angeles (co-dir. Robert Rodriguez); Queens of Pain (co-dir. Cassie Hay)
Special Honorary Award
**To director Shatara Michelle Ford for Test Pattern, the Best Film Made in Austin by a Non-Austin Filmmaker**

== Top 10 Films ==
1. Pig
2. The Power of the Dog
3. Licorice Pizza
4. Dune
5. Drive My Car
6. The Green Knight
7. Titane
8. The Tragedy of Macbeth
9. Parallel Mothers / The Worst Person in the World (TIE)
