= Online Film Critics Society Awards 2021 =

25th Online Film Critics Society Awards

25th Online Film Critics Society Awards
- Date: January 24, 2022

Highlights
- Best Picture: The Power of the Dog
- Most awards: The Power of the Dog (9)
- Most nominations: The Power of the Dog / Dune (9)

The 25th Online Film Critics Society Awards, honoring the best in film for 2021, were announced on January 24, 2022. The nominations were announced on January 18, 2022.

Dune and The Power of the Dog led the nominations with nine each, followed by West Side Story with eight. The Power of the Dog also made a clean sweep, winning all nine of its nominations, including Best Picture.

== Winners and nominees ==
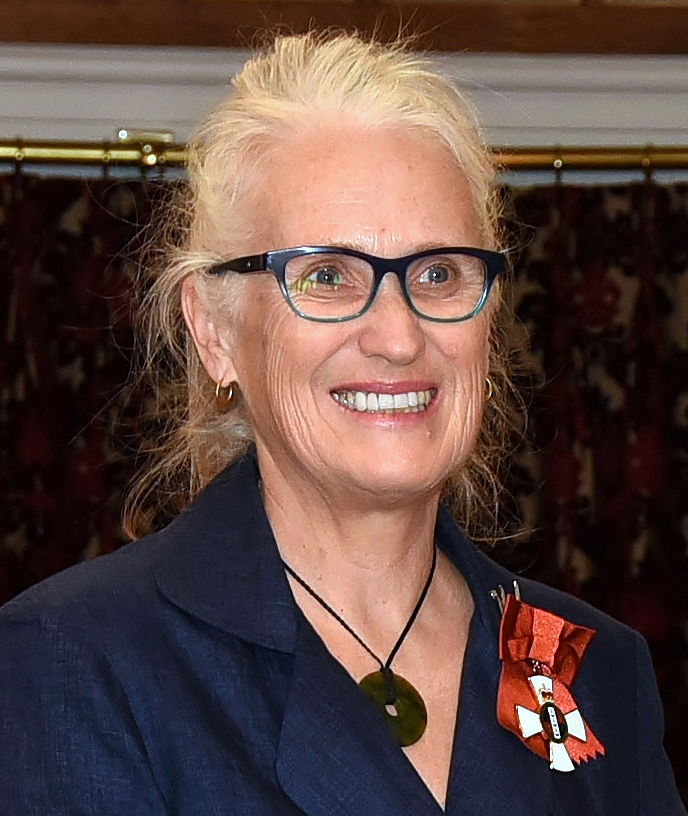
Jane Campion, Best Director and Best Adapted Screenplay winner

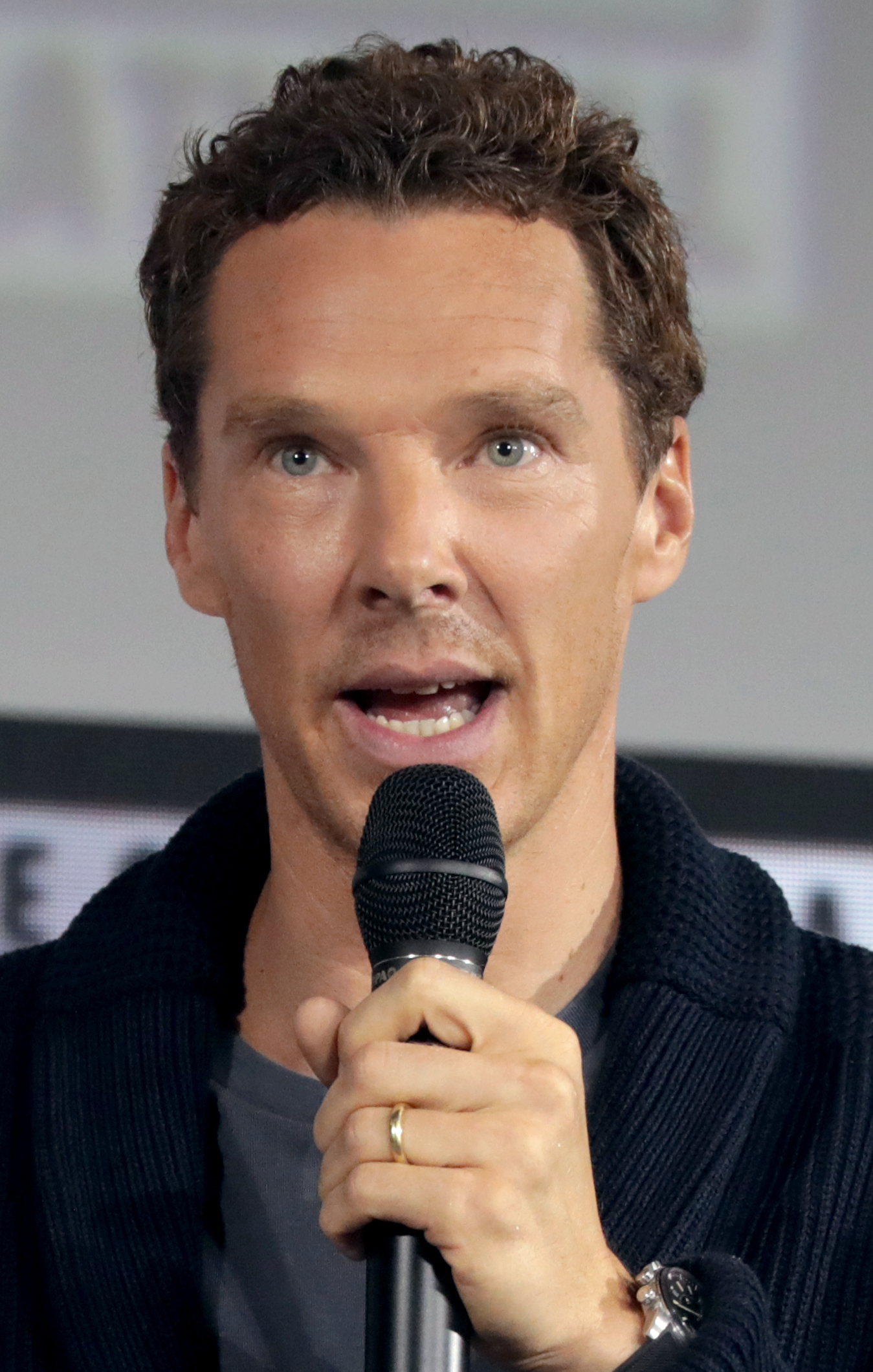
Benedict Cumberbatch, Best Actor winner

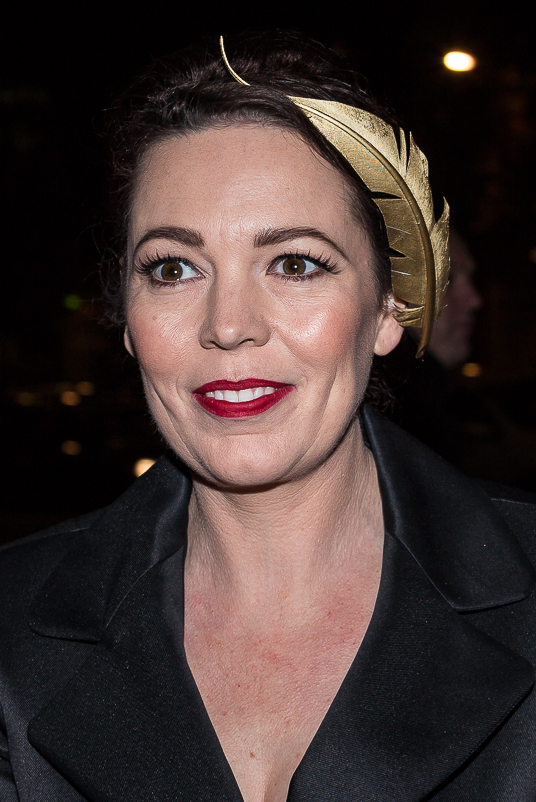
Olivia Colman, Best Actress winner

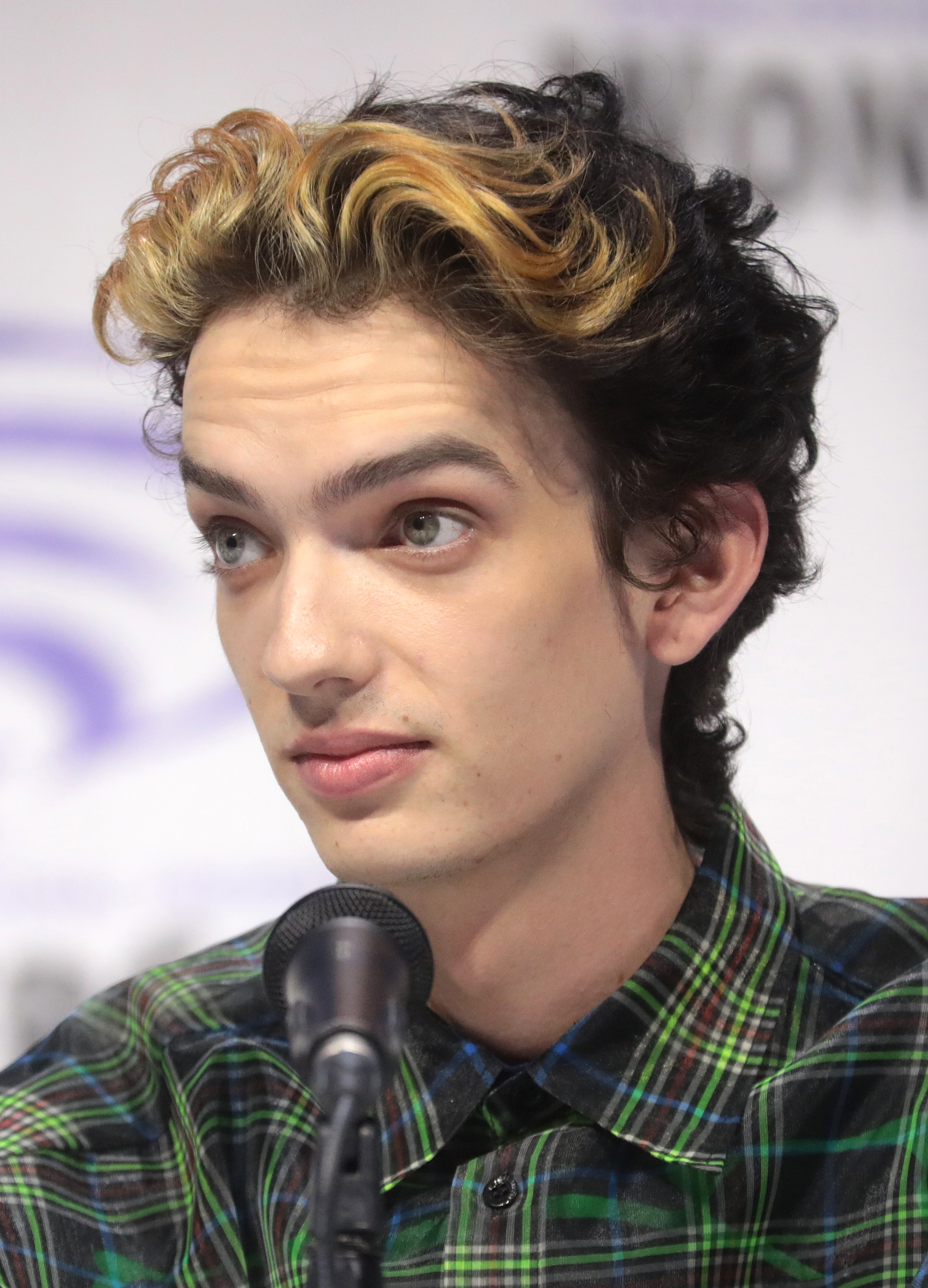
Kodi Smit-McPhee, Best Supporting Actor winner

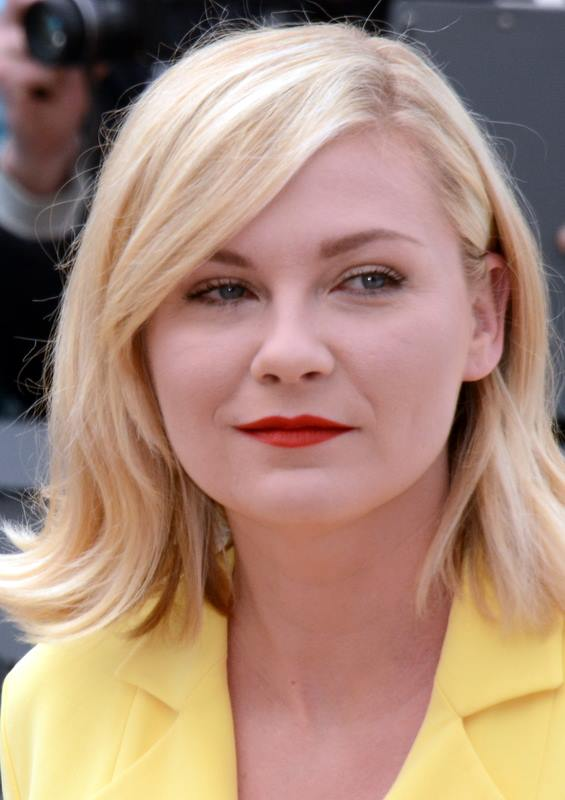
Kirsten Dunst, Best Supporting Actress winner

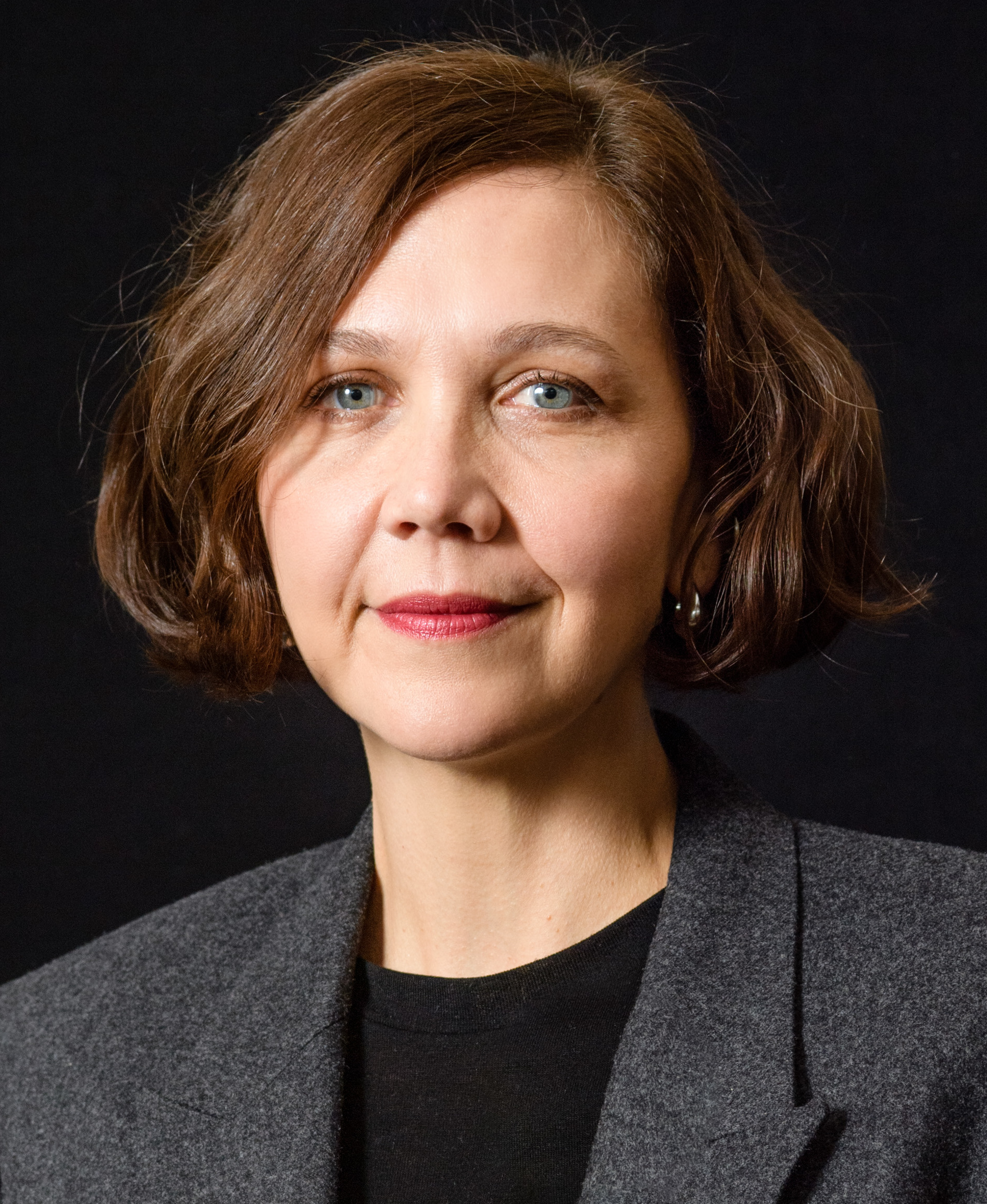
Maggie Gyllenhaal, Best Debut Feature winner

Best Picture	Best Director
1. The Power of the Dog; 2. Drive My Car; 3. Licorice Pizza; 4. Dune; 5. The Green Knight; 6. Pig; 7. The Worst Person in the World; 8. Titane; 9. West Side Story; 10. Belfast	Jane Campion – The Power of the Dog; Paul Thomas Anderson – Licorice Pizza; Ryusuke Hamaguchi – Drive My Car; Steven Spielberg – West Side Story; Denis Villeneuve – Dune
Best Actor	Best Actress
Benedict Cumberbatch – The Power of the Dog as Phil Burbank; Nicolas Cage – Pig as Robbie "Rob" Feld; Andrew Garfield – tick, tick... BOOM! as Jonathan Larson; Oscar Isaac – The Card Counter as William Tell; Hidetoshi Nishijima – Drive My Car as Yūsuke Kafuku	Olivia Colman – The Lost Daughter as Leda Caruso; Alana Haim – Licorice Pizza as Alana Kane; Renate Reinsve – The Worst Person in the World as Julie; Agathe Rousselle – Titane as Alexia / Adrien; Kristen Stewart – Spencer as Diana, Princess of Wales
Best Supporting Actor	Best Supporting Actress
Kodi Smit-McPhee – The Power of the Dog as Peter Gordon; Mike Faist – West Side Story as Riff; Ciarán Hinds – Belfast as Pop; Troy Kotsur – CODA as Frank Rossi; Jeffrey Wright – The French Dispatch as Roebuck Wright	Kirsten Dunst – The Power of the Dog as Rose Gordon; Ariana DeBose – West Side Story as Anita; Ann Dowd – Mass as Linda; Aunjanue Ellis – King Richard as Oracene "Brandy" Price; Ruth Negga – Passing as Clare Bellew
Best Animated Feature	Best Film Not in the English Language
The Mitchells vs. the Machines; Encanto; Flee; Luca; Raya and the Last Dragon	Drive My Car (Japan); Flee (Denmark); A Hero (Iran); Titane (France); The Worst Person in the World (Norway)
Best Documentary	Best Debut Feature
Summer of Soul (...Or, When the Revolution Could Not Be Televised); Flee; Procession; The Rescue; The Velvet Underground	Maggie Gyllenhaal – The Lost Daughter; Rebecca Hall – Passing; Fran Kranz – Mass; Michael Sarnoski – Pig; Emma Seligman – Shiva Baby
Best Original Screenplay	Best Adapted Screenplay
Michael Sarnoski and Vanessa Block – Pig; Paul Thomas Anderson – Licorice Pizza; Kenneth Branagh – Belfast; Asghar Farhadi – A Hero; Fran Kranz – Mass	Jane Campion – The Power of the Dog; Maggie Gyllenhaal – The Lost Daughter; Rebecca Hall – Passing; Ryusuke Hamaguchi and Takamasa Oe – Drive My Car; Eric Roth, Jon Spaihts, and Denis Villeneuve – Dune
Best Cinematography	Best Editing
Ari Wegner – The Power of the Dog; Bruno Delbonnel – The Tragedy of Macbeth; Greig Fraser – Dune; Janusz Kamiński – West Side Story; Andrew Droz Palermo – The Green Knight	Peter Sciberras – The Power of the Dog; Úna Ní Dhonghaíle – Belfast; Andy Jurgensen – Licorice Pizza; Michael Kahn and Sarah Broshar – West Side Story; Joe Walker – Dune
Best Costume Design	Best Production Design
Dune; Cruella; The French Dispatch; Spencer; West Side Story	The French Dispatch; Dune; The Green Knight; Nightmare Alley; West Side Story
Best Original Score	Best Visual Effects
Jonny Greenwood – The Power of the Dog; Alexandre Desplat – The French Dispatch; Germaine Franco – Encanto; Jonny Greenwood – Spencer; Hans Zimmer – Dune	Dune; The Green Knight; The Matrix Resurrections; Shang-Chi and the Legend of the Ten Rings; Spider-Man: No Way Home

== Special awards ==
=== Technical Achievement Awards ===
- Dune – Sound Design
- In the Heights – Choreography
- Memoria – Sound Design
- No Time to Die – Stunt Coordination
- West Side Story – Choreography

=== Lifetime Achievement Awards ===
- John Carpenter
- Tony Leung Chiu-wai
- Sheila Nevins
- Paul Schrader
- John Williams

=== Special Achievement Awards ===
- Turner Classic Movies (TCM), for providing worldwide access to classic films, including silent films
- IATSE Workers, for bringing attention to labor issues in the film industry and fighting for better standards
- The Association of Moving Image Archivists (AMIA), an important non-profit organization devoted to the preservation of film

=== Non-U.S. Releases ===
- 1970 (Poland)
- Bank Job (United Kingdom)
- Benediction (United Kingdom)
- The Girl and the Spider (Switzerland)
- The Medium (Thailand)
- Ninjababy (Norway)
- Petite Maman (France)
- Pleasure (Sweden)
- The Tsugua Diaries (Portugal)
- Vengeance Is Mine, All Others Pay Cash (Indonesia)

== Films with multiple nominations and awards ==
Films that received multiple nominations
Nominations	Film
9	Dune
9	The Power of the Dog
8	West Side Story
5	Drive My Car
5	Licorice Pizza
4	Belfast
4	The French Dispatch
4	The Green Knight
4	Pig
3	Flee
3	The Lost Daughter
3	Mass
3	Passing
3	Spencer
3	Titane
3	The Worst Person in the World
2	Encanto
2	A Hero

Films that received multiple awards
Awards	Film
9	The Power of the Dog
2	Dune
2	The Lost Daughter
