= National Board of Review Award for Best Directorial Debut =

Annual US film award

The National Board of Review Award for Best Directorial Debut is an annual film award given (since 1997, with the exceptions of 1998 and 2000) by the National Board of Review of Motion Pictures.

== Notes ==
- ‡ = Nominated for the Academy Award for Best Director
- ≠ = Nominated in other Oscar categories

== Winners ==
=== 1990s ===
Year	Winner	Film
1997	Kasi Lemmons	Eve's Bayou
1999	Kimberly Peirce	Boys Don't Cry

=== 2000s ===
Year	Winner	Film
2001	John Cameron Mitchell	Hedwig and the Angry Inch
2002	Rob Marshall ‡	Chicago
2003	Vadim Perelman	House of Sand and Fog
2004	Zach Braff	Garden State
2005	Julian Fellowes	Separate Lies
2006	Jason Reitman	Thank You for Smoking
2007	Ben Affleck	Gone Baby Gone
2008	Courtney Hunt≠	Frozen River
2009	Duncan Jones	Moon
2009	Oren Moverman≠	The Messenger
2009	Marc Webb	(500) Days of Summer

=== 2010s ===
Year	Winner	Film
2010	Tim Hetherington & Sebastian Junger≠	Restrepo
2011	J. C. Chandor≠	Margin Call
2012	Benh Zeitlin ‡	Beasts of the Southern Wild
2013	Ryan Coogler	Fruitvale Station
2014	Gillian Robespierre	Obvious Child
2015	Jonas Carpignano	Mediterranea
2016	Trey Edward Shults	Krisha
2017	Jordan Peele ‡	Get Out
2018	Bo Burnham	Eighth Grade
2019	Melina Matsoukas	Queen & Slim

=== 2020s ===
Year	Winner	Film
2020	Channing Godfrey Peoples	Miss Juneteenth
2021	Michael Sarnoski	Pig
2022	Charlotte Wells	Aftersun
2023	Celine Song≠	Past Lives
2024	India Donaldson	Good One
2025	Eva Victor	Sorry, Baby
