= Michael Sarnoski =

American filmmaker

- Born: Milwaukee, Wisconsin, US
- Education: Yale University
- Occupations: Film director; Screenwriter
- Years active: 2021–present

Michael Sarnoski is an American filmmaker who wrote and directed the films Pig (2021), A Quiet Place: Day One (2024), and The Death of Robin Hood (2026). For Pig, he received numerous awards and nominations.

== Early life ==
Sarnoski grew up in Milwaukee, Wisconsin in the United States and attended the University School of Milwaukee. After graduating in 2006, he went to Yale University, where he majored in art and film.

== Career ==
While at Yale, Sarnoski co-wrote and directed the short film Love of the Dead, set in a zombie apocalypse. Sarnoski met Vanessa Block during the making of the film, and they later collaborated on the 2015 short documentary The Testimony, which Block wrote, produced, and directed while Sarnoski was editor and executive producer. Sarnoski also directed episodes of the TV series Olympia and Fight Night Legacy.

Sarnoski wrote and directed Pig based on a story by him and Block, and Neon released it in theaters in the United States on July 16, 2021. Sarnoski received the National Board of Review Award for Best Directorial Debut and was nominated for the Gotham Independent Film Award for Best Feature and the Independent Spirit Awards' Someone to Watch Award and Best First Screenplay Award. He also received various nominations and wins from dozens of critics associations. The Hollywood Reporter wrote that Pig "subverted the past decade’s uptick of revenge films, ending in an empathetic gesture and emotional appeal rather than a bang", and Creative Screenwriting reported that the film "put Sarnoski on the map as a unique creative voice".

In April 2022, New Regency hired Sarnoski to write and direct a film adaptation of the 2018 graphic novel Sabrina.

John Krasinski, who directed A Quiet Place and A Quiet Place Part II, approached Sarnoski to write and direct A Quiet Place: Day One after another director, Jeff Nichols, exited due to creative differences with Krasinski. Sarnoski wrote the screenplay based on a story by him and Krasinski and directed the film. Paramount Pictures released A Quiet Place: Day One in theaters globally in late June 2024.

Also in 2024, Sarnoski began development on the film The Death of Robin Hood, based on the legendary outlaw Robin Hood, with production to begin in February 2025. In April 2025, while in post-production for The Death of Robin Hood, Sarnoski signed on to write and direct a live-action film adaptation of the video game Death Stranding. By the following September, the film was in active development.

== Filmography ==
Sarnoski's credits
Year	Title	Medium	Credits
2015	The Testimony	Short documentary	Editor; executive producer
2021	Pig	Feature film	Director; screenplay based on story by Sarnoski and Vanessa Block
2024	A Quiet Place: Day One	Feature film	Director; screenplay based on story by Sarnoski and John Krasinski
2026	The Death of Robin Hood	Feature film	Director and screenwriter

== Accolades ==
Michael Sarnoski received numerous awards and nominations for the 2021 film Pig.

Accolades received by Michael Sarnoski
Year	Film	Award	Ceremony	Result	Ref.
2021	Pig	Austin Film Critics Association Award for Best First Film	January 11, 2022	Won	
2021	Pig	Austin Film Critics Association Award for Best Original Screenplay	January 11, 2022	Won	
2021	Pig	Chicago Film Critics Association Award for Best Original Screenplay	December 15, 2021	Nominated	
2021	Pig	Chicago Film Critics Association Milos Stehlik Breakthrough Filmmaker Award	December 15, 2021	Won	
2021	Pig	Directors Guild of America Award for Outstanding Directing – First-Time Feature Film	March 12, 2022	Nominated	
2021	Pig	Gotham Independent Film Award for Best Feature with Vanessa Block, et al.	November 29, 2021	Nominated	
2021	Pig	Independent Spirit Award for Best First Screenplay with Vanessa Block	March 6, 2022	Won	
2021	Pig	Independent Spirit Someone to Watch Award	March 6, 2022	Nominated	
2021	Pig	National Board of Review Award for Best Directorial Debut	December 2, 2021	Won	
2021	Pig	Online Film Critics Society Award for Best Debut	January 24, 2022	Nominated	
2021	Pig	Online Film Critics Society Award for Best Original Screenplay with Vanessa Block	January 24, 2022	Won	
2021	Pig	San Diego Film Critics Society Award for Best Original Screenplay	January 10, 2022	Nominated	
2021	Pig	Seattle Film Critics Society Award for Best Screenplay	January 17, 2022	Nominated	
2021	Pig	St. Louis Film Critics Association Award for Best Original Screenplay	December 12, 2021	Nominated	
2024	A Quiet Place: Day One	Astra Midseason Movie Awards for Best Horror	July 3, 2024	Won	
2024	A Quiet Place: Day One	Saturn Award for Best Horror Film	February 2, 2025	Nominated	
