= Passing (film) =

2021 historical drama film by Rebecca Hall

- Promotional release poster
- Directed by: Rebecca Hall
- Screenplay by: Rebecca Hall
- Based on: Passing by Nella Larsen
- Produced by: Nina Yang Bongiovi; Forest Whitaker; Margot Hand; Rebecca Hall
- Starring: Tessa Thompson; Ruth Negga; André Holland; Bill Camp; Gbenga Akinnagbe; Antoinette Crowe-Legacy; Alexander Skarsgård
- Cinematography: Eduard Grau
- Edited by: Sabine Hoffman
- Music by: Devonte Hynes
- Production companies: Significant Productions; Picture Films; Film4 Productions; Flat Five Productions; Gamechanger Films; Sweet Tomato Films; Endeavor Content
- Distributed by: Netflix
- Release dates: January 30, 2021 (Sundance); October 27, 2021 (United States)
- Running time: 98 minutes
- Countries: United Kingdom; United States
- Language: English
- Budget: $10 million

Passing is a 2021 historical drama film written and directed by Rebecca Hall in her feature directorial debut. Adapted from the 1929 novel of the same name by Nella Larsen, set in 1920s New York City, the film follows the intertwined life of a black woman (Tessa Thompson) and her white-passing childhood friend (Ruth Negga). Appearing in supporting roles are André Holland, Bill Camp, Gbenga Akinnagbe, Antoinette Crowe-Legacy, and Alexander Skarsgård. It was filmed in black-and-white.

Passing had its world premiere at the 2021 Sundance Film Festival, on January 30, 2021, and began a limited theatrical release on October 27, 2021, prior to streaming on Netflix on November 10.

The film received acclaim from critics, who praised Hall's screenplay and direction, and the performances of Thompson and Negga. The film was named one of the top ten films of 2021 by the African American Film Critics Association. For her performance, Negga was nominated for the Golden Globe Award, the BAFTA and the Screen Actors Guild Award for Best Supporting Actress.

With this acclaim, many focused on the film in the specific context of literary adaptation. Questions of narrative, character, and visibility drive the critical conversations surrounding this topic.

== Plot ==
In 1920s New York City, Irene Redfield, a light-skinned black woman living in Harlem, meets a childhood friend, Clare Bellew, by chance at a hotel dining room. Irene is married to a black doctor. She learns that Clare has been "passing" as white and has married a wealthy white man from Chicago.

Clare invites Irene to her hotel room, so they can talk more openly. Clare explains that after her father died, she was raised by her two white aunts. She married her husband, John, when she was very young. They are interrupted by John, who openly despises and degrades Black people, unaware of his wife's or Irene's racial background. Irene leaves the hotel, angry with Clare, and refuses to respond when Clare writes to her. However, after Clare unexpectedly shows up at Irene's home and apologizes for the encounter, they rekindle their friendship.

Clare wants to associate with Black people again and invites herself to a dance party that Irene is organizing. Most of the guests at the party find Clare charming, including Irene's husband, Brian. That evening, Irene reveals Clare's secret to her friend, novel writer Hugh Wentworth, who seems less impressed with Clare than the others.

As time passes, Clare becomes involved in all aspects of Irene's life, often joining Irene and Brian on their outings. At first, Irene seems happy to have Clare around, but soon becomes disillusioned with her and starts to resent her presence. Brian, also dissatisfied, attempts to teach his and Irene's children about some of the harshness of racism in America, as Irene refuses to move anywhere else. Irene believes that the children are too young to learn about the worst events, and she and Brian argue about it, further straining their marriage. Brian invites Clare to a tea party from which Irene purposely excluded her.

When out shopping with her friend Felise, who is obviously Black, Irene encounters John. She hurries away, as he begins to realize the truth about his wife's racial background. Irene tries to warn Clare but decides against it when she is unable to reach her by phone.

As Brian, Irene, and Clare are on their way to Felise's Christmas party on the top floor of a six-story building, Irene asks Clare what she would do if John ever learned the truth. Clare replies that she would move back to Harlem to be with Irene, who is troubled by this. During the party, Irene remains silent, avoiding the other guests. She opens a large vertical window to smoke.

Suddenly, John angrily forces himself into the apartment demanding to see Clare. She remains calm and moves next to Irene, who is standing by the window. John accuses her of being a "dirty liar" and lunges towards her. Clare falls backward out of the window, but it is not clear whether John or Irene pushed her or if she deliberately jumped. Notably, this ambiguity is explicitly adapted from Nella Larsen's 1929 text.

In horror, the other guests rush outside, not knowing whether Clare is dead. Irene slowly goes downstairs, where the police are questioning guests. Brian says that he believes John pushed Clare, but when asked, Irene says that she believes the fall was an accident. The film ends with the police declaring death by misadventure, Irene sobbing in Brian's arms, and Clare's body being carried away by medics.

== Cast ==
- Tessa Thompson as Irene "Reenie" Redfield
- Ruth Negga as Clare Bellew
- André Holland as Brian Redfield
- Bill Camp as Hugh Wentworth
- Alexander Skarsgård as John Bellew
- Gbenga Akinnagbe as Dave Freedland
- Antoinette Crowe-Legacy as Felise
- Ashley Ware Jenkins as Zu

== Production ==
It was announced in August 2018 that Rebecca Hall would be making her directorial debut on the adaptation of the Nella Larsen novel, with Tessa Thompson and Ruth Negga set to star in the lead roles.

Hall had begun writing the screenplay a decade earlier, upon reflecting on her own family's history. Her American mother, opera singer Maria Ewing, was of mixed race and some of her relatives passed as white, while her father was a white British film and theatre director.

When Hall presented Negga with a screenplay, the actress decided to collaborate to get the film made. She was surprised that Larsen's novel was not better known, as she had been "completely astounded,” when reading it. Thompson said that the film would be shot in black and white, to represent the texture of the period. The choice to shoot the film in black and white was also inspired by social visibility. Jazz Tangcay writes of this influence on Hall's choice:

"With colorism as a theme, alongside sexism, race, class and gender, Hall gravitated to monochrome — in particular, to remove the idea of complexion and give greater visual freedom to the storytelling."

André Holland was cast in October 2019. In November 2019, Alexander Skarsgård joined the cast.

With less than a month to go before filming and production set to begin, Hall was still $500,000 short on her desired $10 million budget. She applied for two grants, to cover the difference. Filming began in November 2019, in New York City.

The film is in black and white. Benjamin Lee of The Guardian praised the use of a 4:3 aspect ratio, as in this film, it was "both fitting and practical, given a smaller budget". The film uses an anamorphic Lomo lens. Cinematographer Eduard Grau said, “We found they gave this beautiful softness around the edges, which gave the frame a painterly quality that was almost impressionistic,”

Into the third week of filming, the Hugh Wentworth role, originally intended for Benedict Cumberbatch, remained uncast. Budgetary realities and the tight filming timeline meant the production would need an actor who lived in New York. On November 21, Bill Camp signed on, and filming wrapped in December after a 23-day shoot.

== Release ==
Passing had its world premiere at the 2021 Sundance Film Festival on January 30, 2021. Shortly after, Netflix acquired distribution rights to the film for around $15 million. It also screened at the New York Film Festival on October 3, 2021. The film had a limited theatrical release on October 27, 2021, prior to streaming on Netflix on November 10.

According to Samba TV, the film was watched in 653,000 households over its first three days of release.

== Comparison between novel and film ==
Hall’s adaptation changes a few key elements. Critics and scholars have chimed in on these differences to analyze the film in terms of its context as an adaptation.

=== Interpretations of narrative changes ===
Editorial writer Cady Lang discusses some important changes. In the book, Irene and Clare have their initial reencounter on a rooftop in Chicago. Two years of written correspondence follow before the two reunite once again. Instead of setting the initial reencounter between Irene and Clare in Chicago, the pivotal moment—and the entirety of the film—take place in New York. Additionally, the passage of time is condensed between their meetings. In turn, as observed by critic Rafael Walker, the film surrenders parts of the narrative's temporal and erotic aspects. Hall’s choice to condense the time frame makes Irene's yearning less subtle when compared to the text. This is owed to Hall's reliance on lengthy, impassioned gazes between Irene and Clare.

=== Interpretations of character omission and shifts in characterization ===
Missing from the film adaptation is Gertrude—a light-skinned Black woman who does not pass for white—and her husband Fred, a white man who takes no issue with his wife's race. Walker comments on this omission: "The inclusion of Gertrude’s story is Larsen’s way of showing the variability of biracial life and interracial love, providing a middle way between the extremes of Irene and Clare."

Another change is that Hall places Irene and her husband Brian in the same bedroom, a departure from Larsen’s choice to place the married couple in separate rooms. Walker observes this choice in connection to the film's take on the Redfield’s marriage, and Clare’s role within this dynamic. Walker specifically observes that such a choice implies contentment and satisfaction within their marriage prior to her arrival. This contrasts with Larsen’s interpretation, which indeed portrays the Redfields' discord from the beginning. Walker offers that this change is an attempt to soften Irene's characterization.

=== Interpretations of visibility and race ===
The film is shot in black and white. American scholar Imani Perry writes, "... the shades of gray do another kind of work in Passing. We are reminded that our sense of self shifts according to our encounters and relationships with others." Similar to the narrative changes discussed by Walker, Perry also writes of the visible queer subtext: "A piercing gaze, a discomfited mouth, illumination, and shadow all play into the appeal of dangerous uncertainties and suppressed desires."

In the text Passing Bodies, Lisa Mendleman and Octavio R. González evaluates the films distinct visual cues as follows:

Hall’s adaptation relies on the motif of reflective visual surfaces, especially mirrors, to portray racial passing and racial perception, as well as other aspects of modern identity, through visual mediation. Through the use of mirrors, doubled reflections, tricks of perspective, and other optical motifs, Hall cinematically evokes Larsen’s psychological portrait and reproduces the novel’s commentary on the unreliability of racial coding as visual unreliability"

Walker observes that the choice to reveal Irene as a white-passing Black woman through casting boldly differs from Larsen’s choice to conceal this fact until an entire chapter has passed. Critics like Odie Henderson observe that Hall's choice lends to the perception of race by emphasizing Thompson's features against the visualization of race. Henderson delves further, contextualizing these observations: "My temporary disbelief was suspended by a major jolt of reality: Unlike the waiters and patrons surrounding Irene, I know what to look for when it comes to recognizing my own people."

Perry adds to these observations: "...had there been a lighter-skinned actress playing Irene, for many contemporary viewers, the power of that moment might easily have been lost."

== Reception ==
=== Critical reception ===
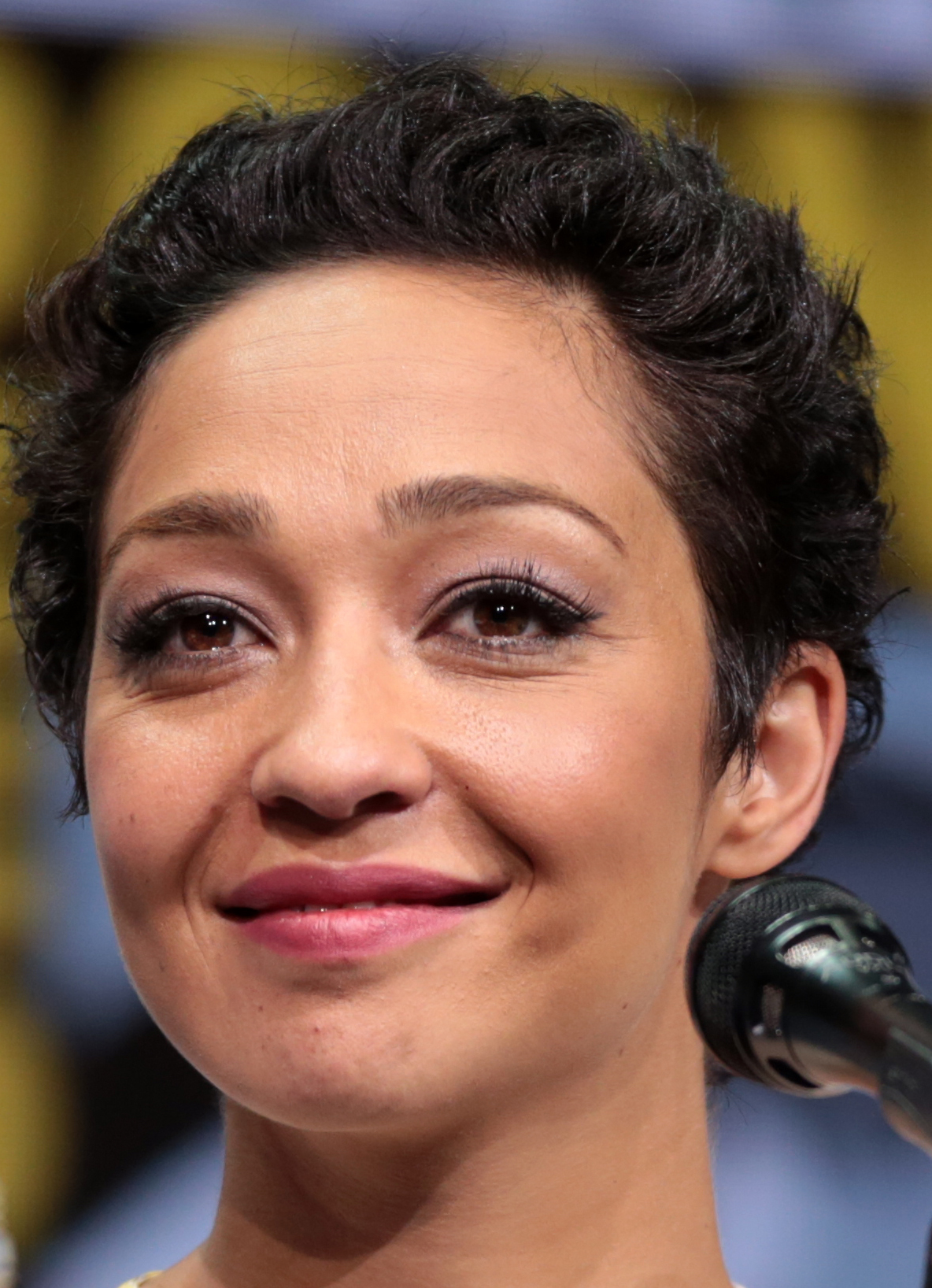
Ruth Negga's performance in the film garnered widespread critical praise.

On the review aggregator website Rotten Tomatoes, 91% of 248 critics' reviews are positive, with an average rating of 7.7/10. The website's consensus reads: "While Passing's delicate approach has a dampening effect on its story, debuting director Rebecca Hall makes the most of an impressive cast—and handles thorny themes with impressive dexterity." Metacritic, which uses a weighted average, assigned the film a score of 85 out of 100, based on 46 critics, indicating "universal acclaim".

Kevin Maher of The Times gave the film 4 out of 5 stars, calling it, "a mesmerizing, deeply disquieting experience." Jessica Kiang, writing for Variety, said that the film is "unerring, deceptively delicate, quiet and immaculate, like that final fall of snow."

In his review for The Guardian, Peter Bradshaw praised Hall's direction, calling the film, "a very stylish piece of work from Hall." Benjamin Lee of The Guardian, gave the film a negative review of 2 out of 5 stars, arguing that it had "disappointing lack of verve" and was "inert".

The performances of Negga and Thompson, in particular, received praise. In a very positive review for the Chicago Tribune, Michael Phillips gave the film a perfect score of four out of four stars and wrote of their performances: "What Thompson and Negga accomplish on screen, in this extraordinarily detailed portrait, becomes a master class in incremental revelations." David Rooney of The Hollywood Reporter lauded Thompson for her "unshowy, beautifully internalized performance,” and Simran Hans called Negga "magnetic" in her review for The Guardian. In Time Magazine's annual list, Stephanie Zacharek ranked Negga's performance among the ten best of 2021.

Filmmaker Antonio Campos praised the film, calling it "one of the strongest debut features I've ever seen. Rebecca [Hall]'s grasp of visual storytelling is astounding. It's one thing to know where to put the camera and compose a shot, but to understand how to convey your themes visually is something that even experienced filmmakers struggle with. Rebecca's use of negative space, light and shadow, along with her choices in what was shown and what wasn't to convey not only suspense but her characters' internal struggles, exhibits such a mastery of craft that it is hard to believe she hasn’t been making films her whole life."

== Accolades ==
Award	Date of ceremony	Category	Recipient(s)	Result	Ref.
African-American Film Critics Association	January 17, 2022	Top Ten Films of 2021	Passing	5th place	
Alliance of Women Film Journalists	January 25, 2022	Best Picture	Passing	Nominated	
Alliance of Women Film Journalists	January 25, 2022	Best Director	Rebecca Hall	Nominated	
Alliance of Women Film Journalists	January 25, 2022	Best Actress	Tessa Thompson	Nominated	
Alliance of Women Film Journalists	January 25, 2022	Best Actress in a Supporting Role	Ruth Negga	Nominated	
Alliance of Women Film Journalists	January 25, 2022	Best Screenplay, Adapted	Rebecca Hall	Nominated	
Alliance of Women Film Journalists	January 25, 2022	Best Cinematography	Eduard Grau	Nominated	
Alliance of Women Film Journalists	January 25, 2022	Best Woman Director	Rebecca Hall	Nominated	
Alliance of Women Film Journalists	January 25, 2022	Best Woman Screenwriter	Rebecca Hall	Nominated	
Alliance of Women Film Journalists	January 25, 2022	Most Daring Performance	Ruth Negga	Nominated	
Artios Awards	March 17, 2022	Outstanding Achievement in Casting – Studio or Independent (Drama)	Laura Rosenthal and Kimberly Ostroy	Nominated	
Austin Film Critics Association	January 11, 2022	Best Supporting Actress	Ruth Negga	Nominated	
Austin Film Critics Association	January 11, 2022	Best First Film	Rebecca Hall	Nominated	
British Academy Film Awards	March 13, 2022	Outstanding British Film	Nina Yang Bongiovi, Forest Whitaker, Rebecca Hall and Margot Hand	Nominated	
British Academy Film Awards	March 13, 2022	Outstanding Debut by a British Writer, Director or Producer	Rebecca Hall	Nominated	
British Academy Film Awards	March 13, 2022	Best Actress in a Leading Role	Tessa Thompson	Nominated	
British Academy Film Awards	March 13, 2022	Best Actress in a Supporting Role	Ruth Negga	Nominated	
Black Reel Awards	February 27, 2022	Outstanding Motion Picture	Nina Yang Bongiovi, Forest Whitaker, Rebecca Hall and Margot Hand	Nominated	
Black Reel Awards	February 27, 2022	Outstanding Director	Rebecca Hall	Nominated	
Black Reel Awards	February 27, 2022	Outstanding Actress	Tessa Thompson	Won	
Black Reel Awards	February 27, 2022	Outstanding Supporting Actor	André Holland	Nominated	
Black Reel Awards	February 27, 2022	Outstanding Supporting Actress	Ruth Negga	Nominated	
Black Reel Awards	February 27, 2022	Outstanding Screenplay	Rebecca Hall	Won	
Black Reel Awards	February 27, 2022	Outstanding Ensemble	Kim Ostroy and Laura Rosenthal	Nominated	
Black Reel Awards	February 27, 2022	Outstanding Original Score	Devonté Hynes	Nominated	
Black Reel Awards	February 27, 2022	Outstanding Emerging Director	Rebecca Hall	Nominated	
Black Reel Awards	February 27, 2022	Outstanding First Screenplay	Rebecca Hall	Won	
Black Reel Awards	February 27, 2022	Outstanding Cinematography	Edu Grau	Nominated	
Black Reel Awards	February 27, 2022	Outstanding Costume Design	Marci Rodgers	Nominated	
Black Reel Awards	February 27, 2022	Outstanding Production Design	Nora Mendis	Nominated	
Chicago Film Critics Association	December 15, 2021	Best Supporting Actress	Ruth Negga	Won	
Chicago Film Critics Association	December 15, 2021	Milos Stehlik Breakthrough Filmmaker Award	Rebecca Hall	Nominated	
Dallas–Fort Worth Film Critics Association	December 20, 2021	Best Supporting Actress	Ruth Negga	5th place	
Directors Guild of America Awards	March 12, 2022	Outstanding Directing – First-Time Feature Film	Rebecca Hall	Nominated	
Florida Film Critics Circle	December 22, 2021	Best Supporting Actress	Ruth Negga	Runner-up	
Florida Film Critics Circle	December 22, 2021	Best First Film	Rebecca Hall	Runner-up	
Georgia Film Critics Association	January 14, 2022	Best Supporting Actress	Ruth Negga	Nominated	
Golden Globe Awards	January 9, 2022	Best Supporting Actress – Motion Picture	Ruth Negga	Nominated	
Gotham Independent Film Awards	November 29, 2021	Best Feature	Passing	Nominated	
Gotham Independent Film Awards	November 29, 2021	Bingham Ray Breakthrough Director Award	Rebecca Hall	Nominated	
Gotham Independent Film Awards	November 29, 2021	Best Screenplay	Rebecca Hall	Nominated	
Gotham Independent Film Awards	November 29, 2021	Outstanding Lead Performance	Tessa Thompson	Nominated	
Gotham Independent Film Awards	November 29, 2021	Outstanding Supporting Performance	Ruth Negga	Nominated	
Greater Western New York Film Critics Association	January 1, 2022	Best Supporting Actress	Ruth Negga	Won	
Greater Western New York Film Critics Association	January 1, 2022	Best Adapted Screenplay	Rebecca Hall	Nominated	
Greater Western New York Film Critics Association	January 1, 2022	Breakthrough Director	Rebecca Hall	Nominated	
Hollywood Creative Alliance	February 28, 2022	Best Supporting Actress	Ruth Negga	Nominated	
Hollywood Creative Alliance	February 28, 2022	Best Director	Rebecca Hall	Nominated	
Hollywood Creative Alliance	February 28, 2022	Best Adapted Screenplay	Rebecca Hall	Nominated	
Hollywood Creative Alliance	February 28, 2022	Best First Feature	Passing	Nominated	
Independent Spirit Awards	March 6, 2022	Best Supporting Female	Ruth Negga	Won	
Independent Spirit Awards	March 6, 2022	Best Cinematography	Eduard Grau	Won	
IndieWire Critics Poll	December 13, 2021	Best Film	Passing	9th place	
IndieWire Critics Poll	December 13, 2021	Best Performance	Tessa Thompson	7th place	
IndieWire Critics Poll	December 13, 2021	Best Cinematography	Eduard Grau	8th place	
IndieWire Critics Poll	December 13, 2021	Best First Feature	Rebecca Hall	Runner-up	
International Cinephile Society	February 6, 2022	Best Supporting Actress	Ruth Negga	Won	
International Cinephile Society	February 6, 2022	Best Adapted Screenplay	Rebecca Hall	Nominated	
International Cinephile Society	February 6, 2022	Best Debut Feature	Rebecca Hall	Runner-up	
London Film Critics' Circle	February 7, 2022	Supporting Actress of the Year	Ruth Negga	Won	
London Film Critics' Circle	February 7, 2022	British/Irish Actress of the Year	Ruth Negga	Nominated	
London Film Critics' Circle	February 7, 2022	Breakthrough British/Irish Filmmaker	Rebecca Hall	Won	
National Society of Film Critics	January 8, 2022	Best Supporting Actress	Ruth Negga	Won	
New York Film Critics Online	December 12, 2021	Best Actress	Tessa Thompson	Won	
New York Film Critics Online	December 12, 2021	Best Supporting Actress	Ruth Negga	Won	
New York Film Critics Online	December 12, 2021	Best Debut Director	Rebecca Hall	Won	
New York Film Critics Online	December 12, 2021	Top Ten Films	Passing	Won	
Online Film Critics Society	January 24, 2022	Best Supporting Actress	Ruth Negga	Nominated	
Online Film Critics Society	January 24, 2022	Best Adapted Screenplay	Rebecca Hall	Nominated	
Online Film Critics Society	January 24, 2022	Best Breakthrough Filmmaker	Rebecca Hall	Nominated	
San Diego Film Critics Society	January 10, 2022	Best Supporting Actress	Ruth Negga	Won	
San Diego Film Critics Society	January 10, 2022	Best Adapted Screenplay	Rebecca Hall	Nominated	
San Francisco Bay Area Film Critics Circle	January 10, 2022	Best Adapted Screenplay	Rebecca Hall	Nominated	
San Francisco Bay Area Film Critics Circle	January 10, 2022	Best Actress	Tessa Thompson	Nominated	
San Francisco Bay Area Film Critics Circle	January 10, 2022	Best Supporting Actress	Ruth Negga	Nominated	
Satellite Awards	April 2, 2022	Best Supporting Actress	Ruth Negga	Nominated	
Satellite Awards	April 2, 2022	Best Adapted Screenplay	Rebecca Hall and Nella Larsen	Nominated	
Screen Actors Guild Awards	February 27, 2022	Outstanding Performance by a Female Actor in a Supporting Role	Ruth Negga	Nominated	
Seattle Film Critics Society	January 17, 2022	Best Actress in a Supporting Role	Ruth Negga	Nominated	
St. Louis Film Critics Association	December 19, 2021	Best Supporting Actress	Ruth Negga	Nominated	
Toronto Film Critics Association	January 16, 2022	Best Supporting Actress	Ruth Negga	Runner-up	
Toronto Film Critics Association	January 16, 2022	Best First Feature	Rebecca Hall	Runner-up	
USC Scripter Awards	February 26, 2022	Film Adaptation	Rebecca Hall	Nominated	
Washington D.C. Area Film Critics Association	December 6, 2021	Best Actress	Tessa Thompson	Nominated	
