= Chicago Film Critics Association Awards 2021 =

Annual US film awards ceremony

34th Chicago Film Critics Association Awards
- Date: December 15, 2021
- Site: Chicago, Illinois, U.S.

Highlights
- Best Picture: The Power of the Dog
- Most awards: The Power of the Dog (7)
- Most nominations: West Side Story (11)

The 34th Chicago Film Critics Association Awards were announced on December 15, 2021. The awards honor the best in film for 2021. The nominations were announced on December 13, 2021. West Side Story received the most nominations (11), followed by The Power of the Dog (8) and The Green Knight (7).

== Winners and nominees ==
The winners and nominees for the 34th Chicago Film Critics Association Awards are as follows:

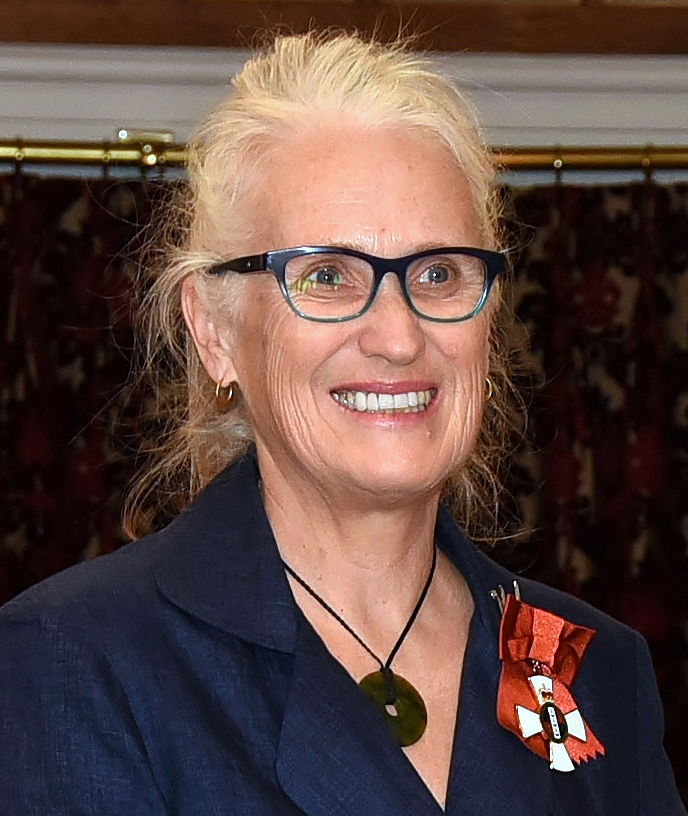
Jane Campion, Best Director and Best Adapted Screenplay winner

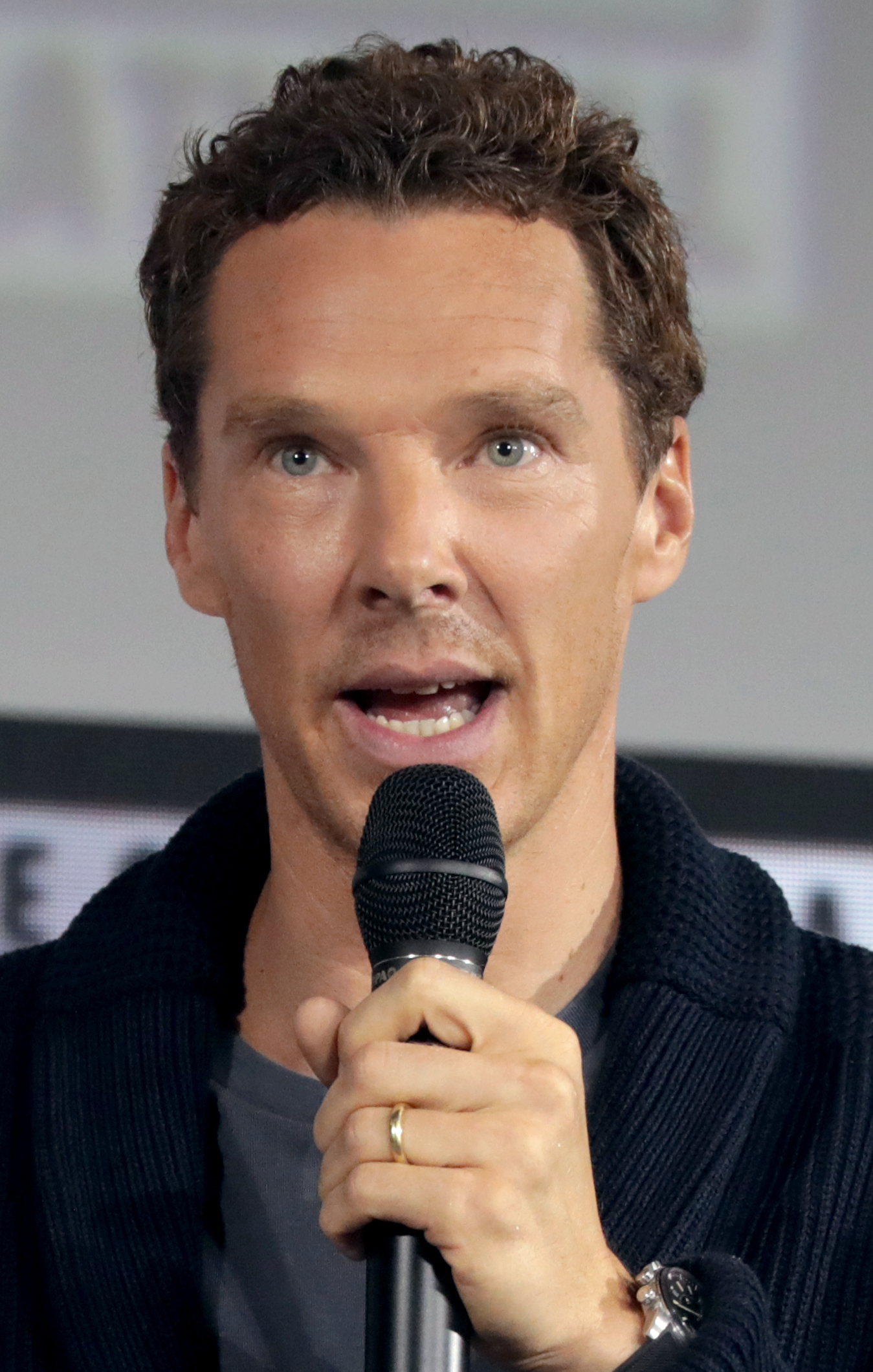
Benedict Cumberbatch, Best Actor winner

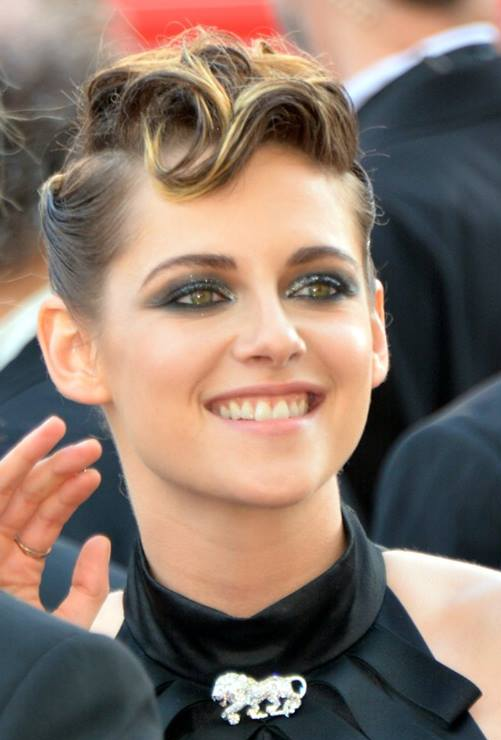
Kristen Stewart, Best Actress winner

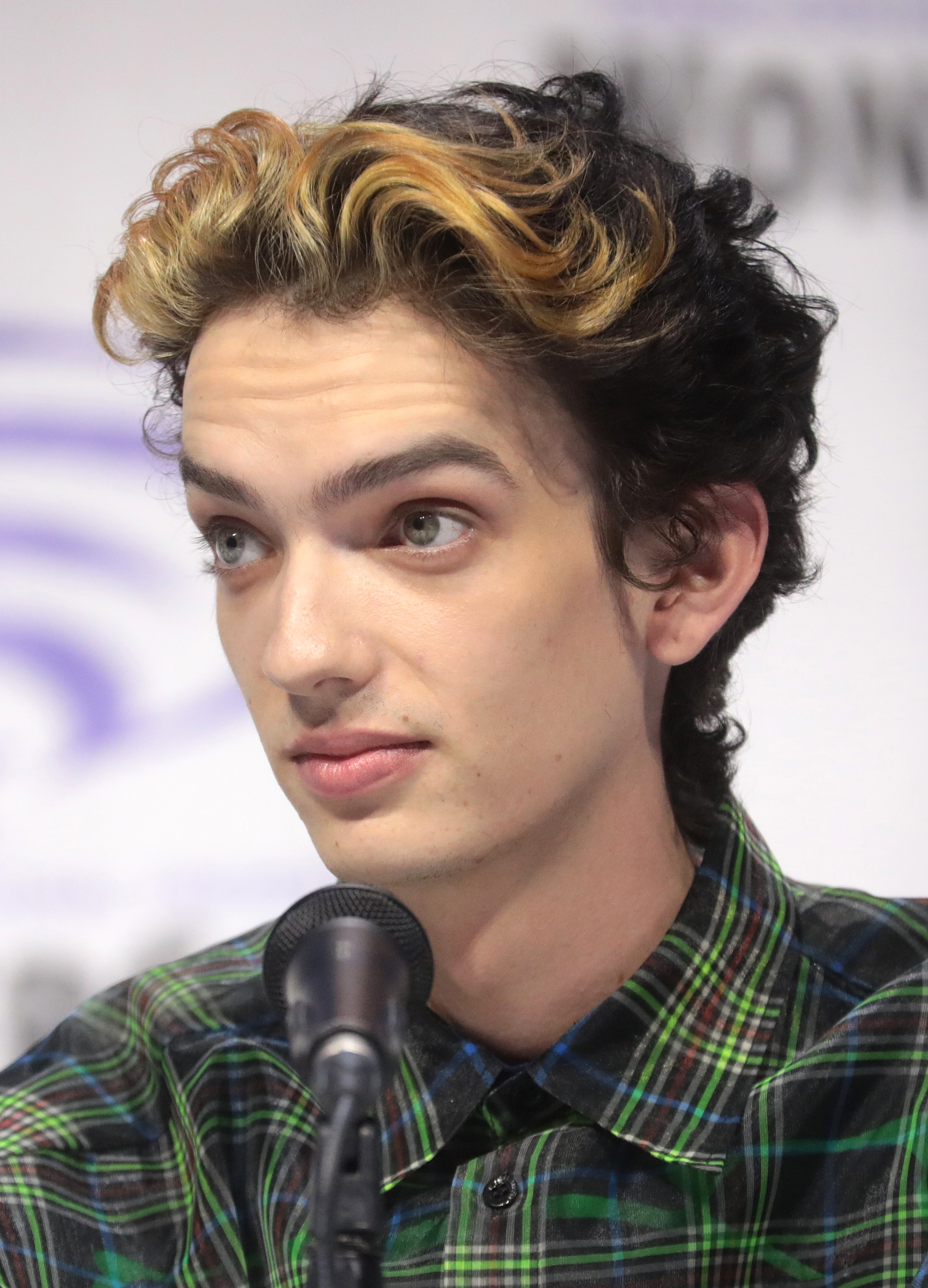
Kodi Smit-McPhee, Best Supporting Actor winner

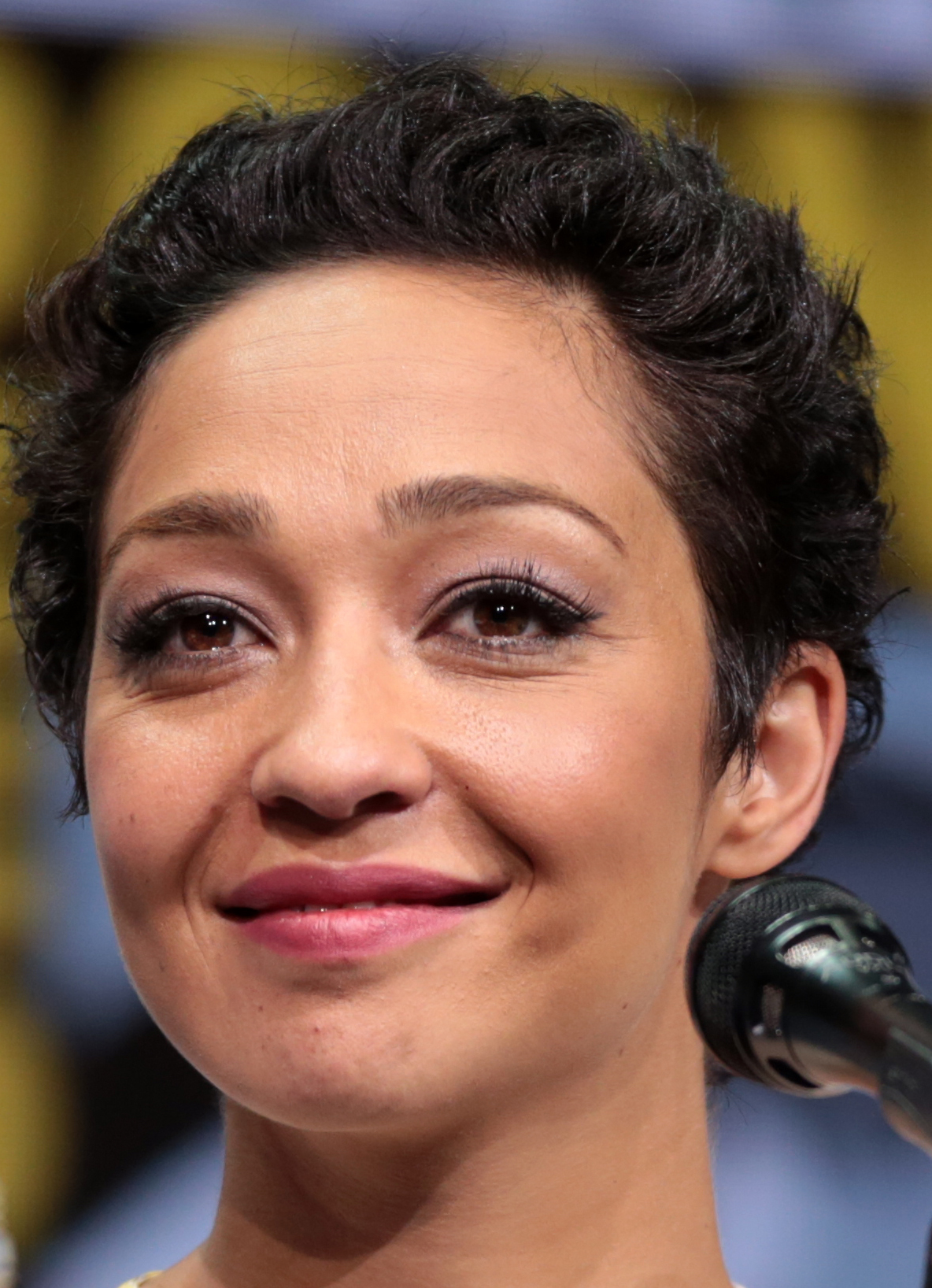
Ruth Negga, Best Supporting Actress winner

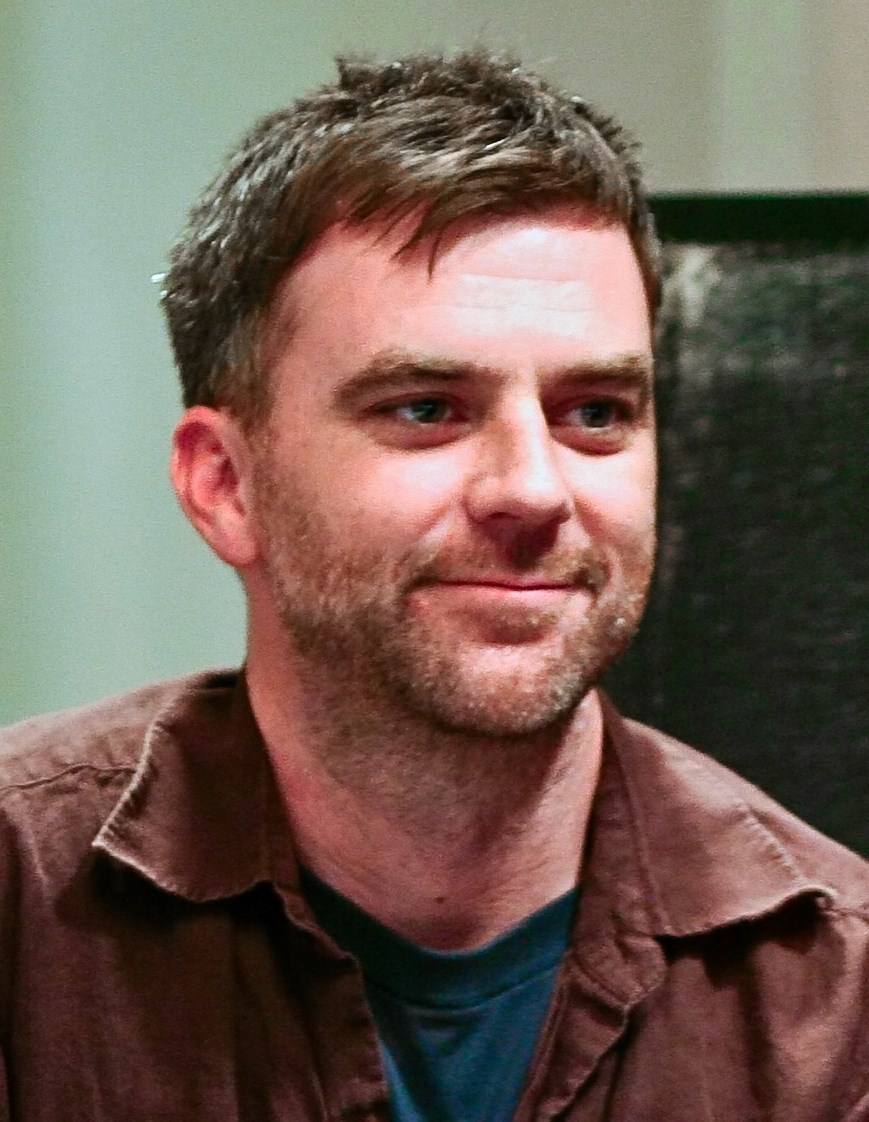
Paul Thomas Anderson, Best Original Screenplay winner

=== Awards ===
Best Film	Best Director
The Power of the Dog; Drive My Car; The Green Knight; Licorice Pizza; West Side Story	Jane Campion – The Power of the Dog; Paul Thomas Anderson – Licorice Pizza; Ryusuke Hamaguchi – Drive My Car; David Lowery – The Green Knight; Steven Spielberg – West Side Story
Best Actor	Best Actress
Benedict Cumberbatch – The Power of the Dog as Phil Burbank; Nicolas Cage – Pig as Robin "Rob" Feld; Andrew Garfield – tick, tick... BOOM! as Jonathan Larson; Hidetoshi Nishijima – Drive My Car as Yūsuke Kafuku; Simon Rex – Red Rocket as Mikey Davies/Saber	Kristen Stewart – Spencer as Diana, Princess of Wales; Jessica Chastain – The Eyes of Tammy Faye as Tammy Faye Bakker; Olivia Colman – The Lost Daughter as Leda Caruso; Alana Haim – Licorice Pizza as Alana Kane; Agathe Rousselle – Titane as Alexia / Adrien
Best Supporting Actor	Best Supporting Actress
Kodi Smit-McPhee – The Power of the Dog as Peter Gordon; Bradley Cooper – Licorice Pizza as Jon Peters; Colman Domingo – Zola as Abegunde "X" Olawale; Mike Faist – West Side Story as Riff; Jeffrey Wright – The French Dispatch as Roebuck Wright	Ruth Negga – Passing as Clare Bellew; Caitríona Balfe – Belfast as Ma; Jessie Buckley – The Lost Daughter as Young Leda Caruso; Ariana DeBose – West Side Story as Anita; Riley Keough – Zola as Stefani
Best Original Screenplay	Best Adapted Screenplay
Licorice Pizza – Paul Thomas Anderson; The Card Counter – Paul Schrader; The French Dispatch – Wes Anderson; Pig – Michael Sarnoski; Red Rocket – Sean Baker and Chris Bergoch	The Power of the Dog – Jane Campion; Drive My Car – Ryusuke Hamaguchi, Haruki Murakami, and Takamasa Oe; The Green Knight – David Lowery; The Lost Daughter – Maggie Gyllenhaal; West Side Story – Tony Kushner
Best Animated Film	Best Foreign Language Film
Flee; Belle; Encanto; Luca; The Mitchells vs. the Machines	Drive My Car; A Hero; Petite Maman; Titane; The Worst Person in the World
Best Documentary Film	Best Original Score
Summer of Soul (...Or, When the Revolution Could Not Be Televised); Flee; Procession; The Sparks Brothers; The Velvet Underground	The Power of the Dog – Jonny Greenwood; Annette – Ron Mael and Russell Mael; Dune – Hans Zimmer; The French Dispatch – Alexandre Desplat; Spencer – Jonny Greenwood
Best Art Direction/Production Design	Best Costume Design
The French Dispatch; Dune; The Green Knight; Nightmare Alley; West Side Story	Spencer – Jacqueline Durran; Cruella – Jenny Beavan; Dune – Robert Morgan and Jacqueline West; The Green Knight – Malgosia Turzanska; West Side Story – Paul Tazewell
Best Editing	Best Cinematography
The French Dispatch – Andrew Weisblum; Drive My Car – Azusa Yamazaki; Dune – Joe Walker; The Power of the Dog – Peter Sciberras; West Side Story – Michael Kahn and Sarah Broshar	The Power of the Dog – Ari Wegner; Dune – Greig Fraser; The Green Knight – Andrew Droz Palermo; The Tragedy of Macbeth – Bruno Delbonnel; West Side Story – Janusz Kamiński
Best Use of Visual Effects	Milos Stehlik Breakthrough Filmmaker Award
Dune; Annette; The Green Knight; Nightmare Alley; Titane	Michael Sarnoski – Pig; Maggie Gyllenhaal – The Lost Daughter; Rebecca Hall – Passing; Sian Heder – CODA; Emma Seligman – Shiva Baby
Most Promising Performer	
Alana Haim – Licorice Pizza as Alana Kane; Ariana DeBose – West Side Story as Anita; Emilia Jones – CODA as Ruby Rossi; Rachel Sennott – Shiva Baby as Danielle; Rachel Zegler – West Side Story as María	

== Awards breakdown ==
The following films received multiple nominations:

Nominations	Film
11	West Side Story
8	The Power of the Dog
7	The Green Knight
6	Drive My Car
6	Dune
6	Licorice Pizza
4	The Lost Daughter
3	Pig
3	Spencer
3	Titane
2	Annette
2	CODA
2	Flee
2	The French Dispatch
2	Nightmare Alley
2	Passing
2	Red Rocket
2	Shiva Baby

The following films received multiple wins:

Wins	Film
7	The Power of the Dog
2	The French Dispatch
2	Licorice Pizza
2	Spencer
