= Austin Film Critics Association Award for Best Original Screenplay =

Annual US film award

The Austin Film Critics Association Award for Best Original Screenplay is an annual award given by the Austin Film Critics Association, honoring the best in screenplay.

== Winners ==
=== 2000s ===
Year	Winner	Screenwriter(s)
2005	The Squid and the Whale	Noah Baumbach
2006	Pan's Labyrinth (El laberinto del fauno)	Guillermo del Toro
2007	Juno	Diablo Cody
2008	Synecdoche, New York	Charlie Kaufman
2009	Inglourious Basterds	Quentin Tarantino

=== 2010s ===
Year	Winner	Screenwriter(s)
2010	Black Swan	Mark Heyman, Andres Heinz, and John McLaughlin
2011	Midnight in Paris	Woody Allen
2012	Looper	Rian Johnson
2013	Her	Spike Jonze
2014	Nightcrawler	Dan Gilroy
2015	Inside Out	Pete Docter, Meg LeFauve and Josh Cooley
2016	Moonlight	Barry Jenkins
2017	Get Out	Jordan Peele
2018	Sorry to Bother You	Boots Riley
2019	Parasite	Bong Joon-ho and Han Jin-won

=== 2020s ===
Year	Winner	Screenwriter(s)
2020	Minari	Lee Isaac Chung
2021	Pig	Vanessa Block and Michael Sarnoski
2022	Everything Everywhere All at Once	Daniel Kwan and Daniel Scheinert
2023	Past Lives	Celine Song
2024	Anora	Sean Baker
2025	Marty Supreme	Ronald Bronstein and Josh Safdie

== See also ==
- Austin Film Critics Association Award for Best Adapted Screenplay
