= San Diego Film Critics Society Awards 2021 =

26th San Diego Film Critics Society Awards

26th San Diego Film Critics Society Awards
- Date: January 10, 2022
- Site: San Diego, California, U.S.

Highlights
- Best Picture: The Power of the Dog
- Most awards: Dune / The Power of the Dog (3)
- Most nominations: Belfast (12)

The 26th San Diego Film Critics Society Awards were announced on January 10, 2022. The nominations were announced on January 7, 2022, with Belfast leading the nominations with twelve, followed by Dune with nine and The Power of the Dog with eight.

Dune and The Power of the Dog won the most awards with three wins each, with the latter winning Best Picture.

== Winners and nominees ==
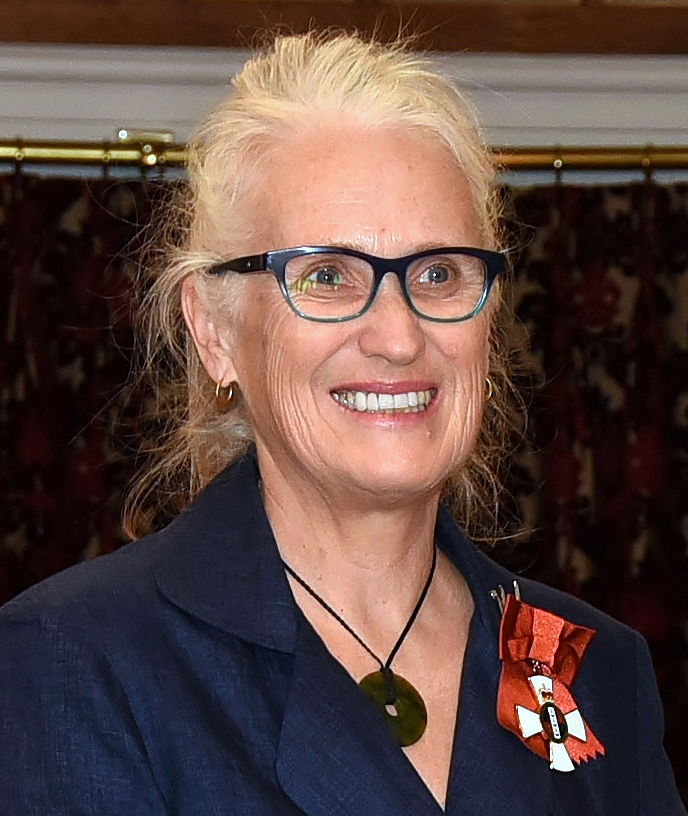
Jane Campion, Best Director and Best Adapted Screenplay winner

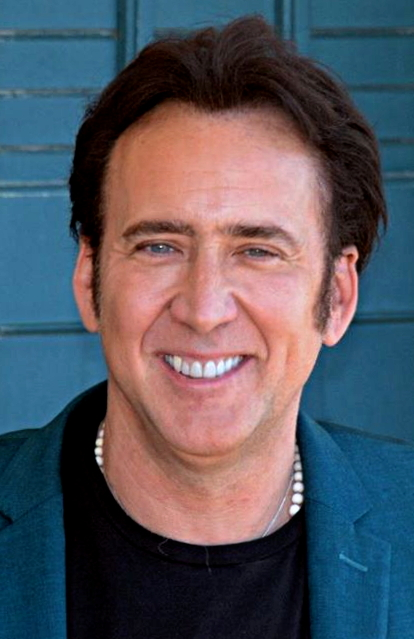
Nicolas Cage, Best Actor winner

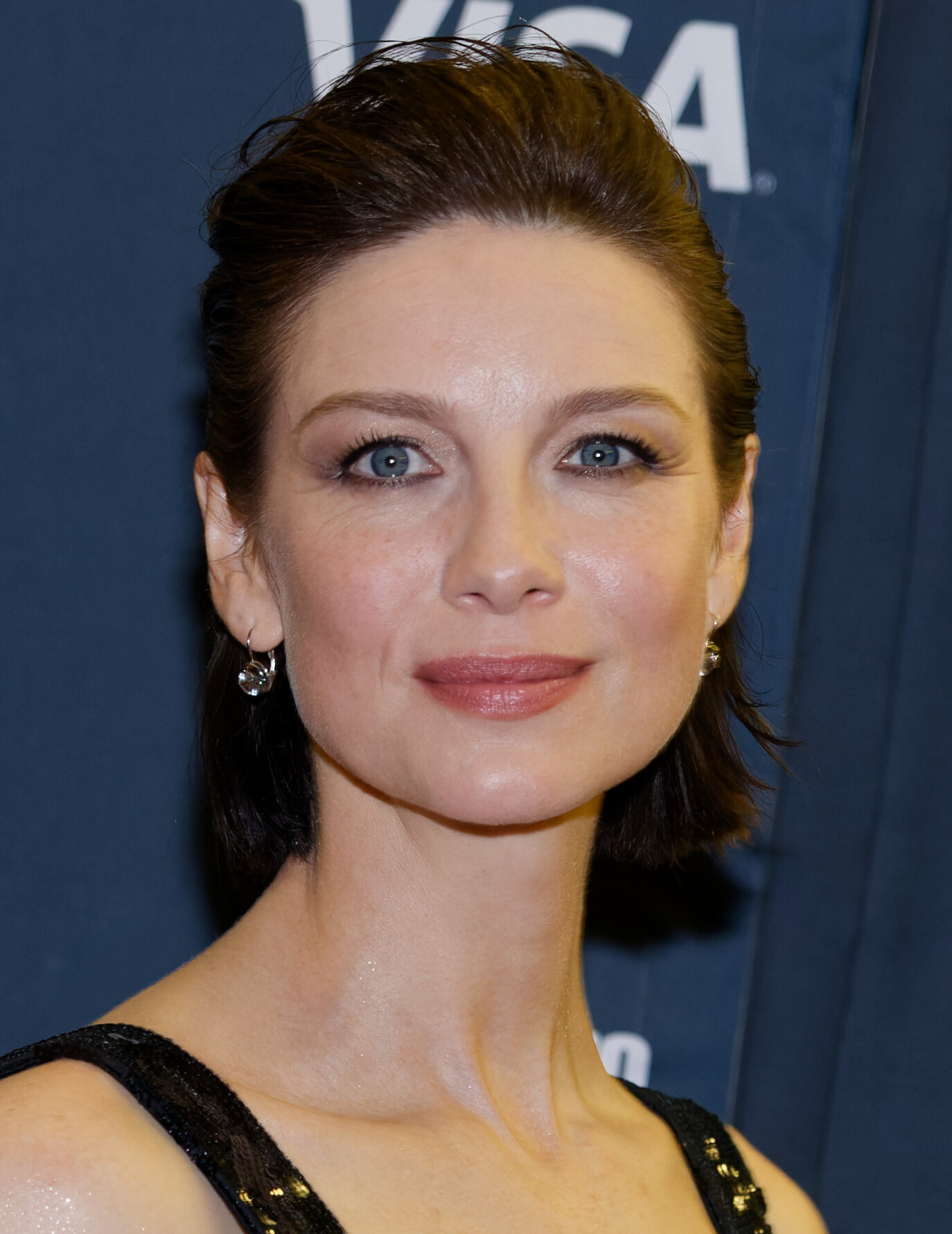
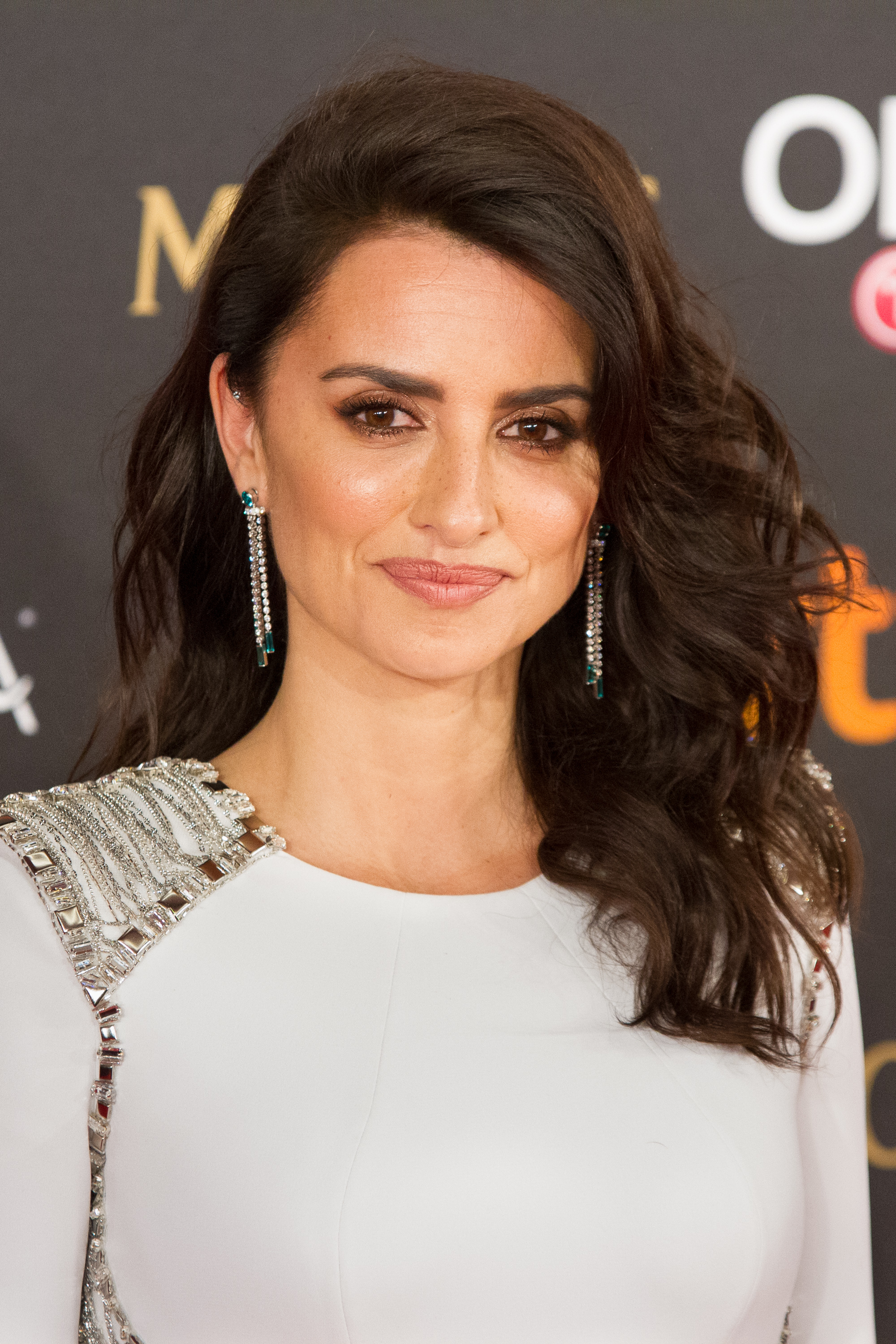
Caitríona Balfe and Penélope Cruz, Best Actress winners

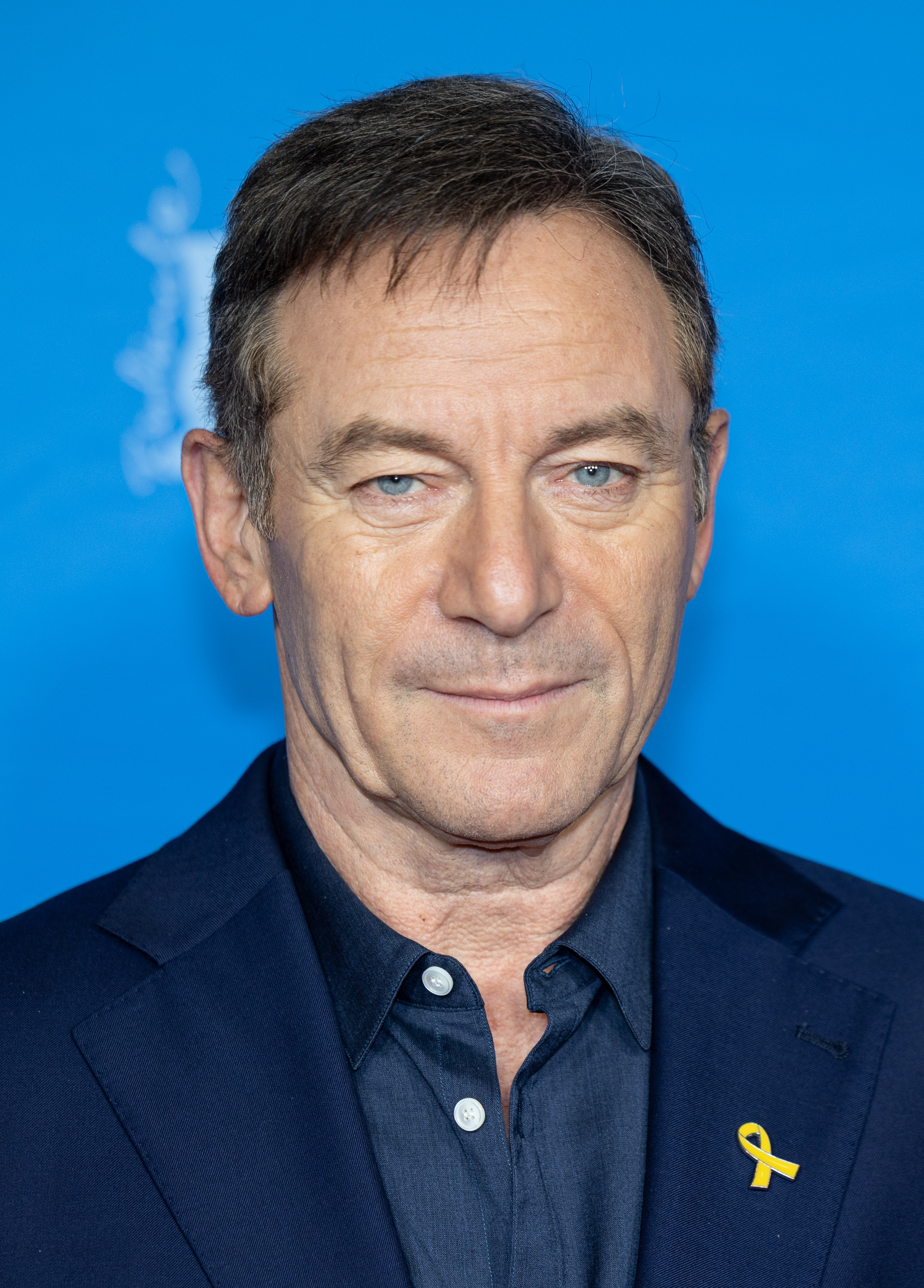
Jason Isaacs, Best Supporting Actor winner

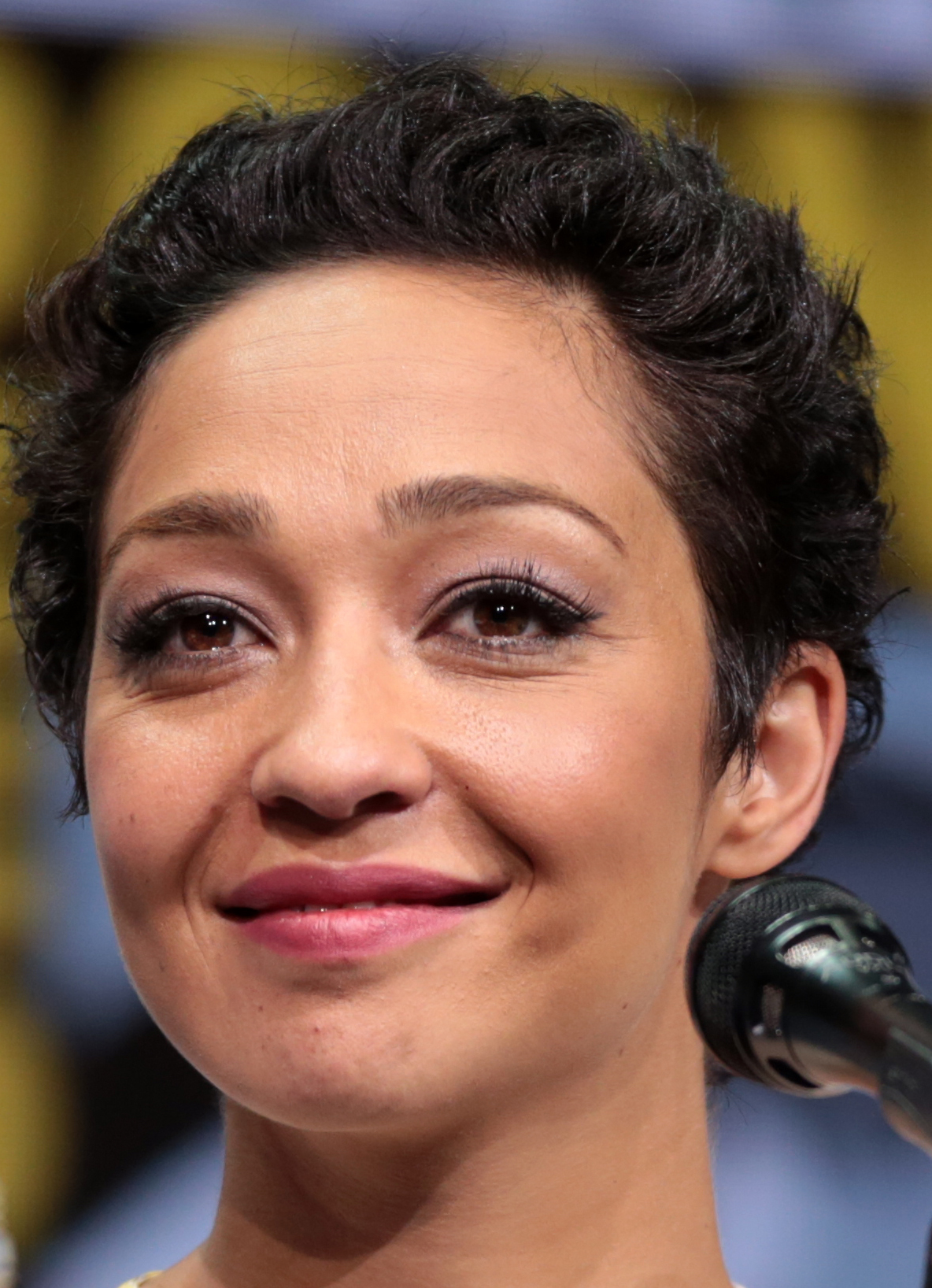
Ruth Negga, Best Supporting Actress winner

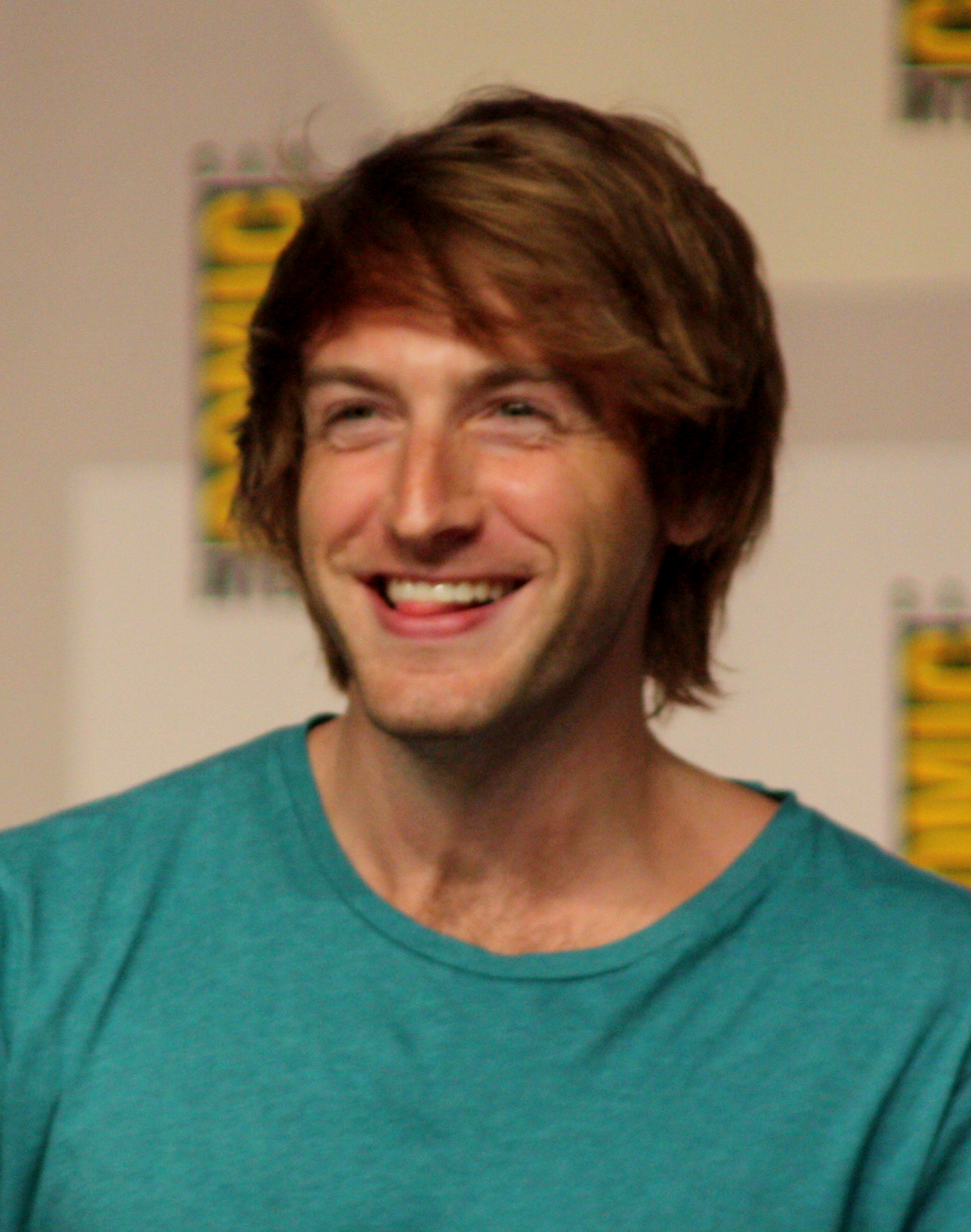
Fran Kranz, Best Original Screenplay winner

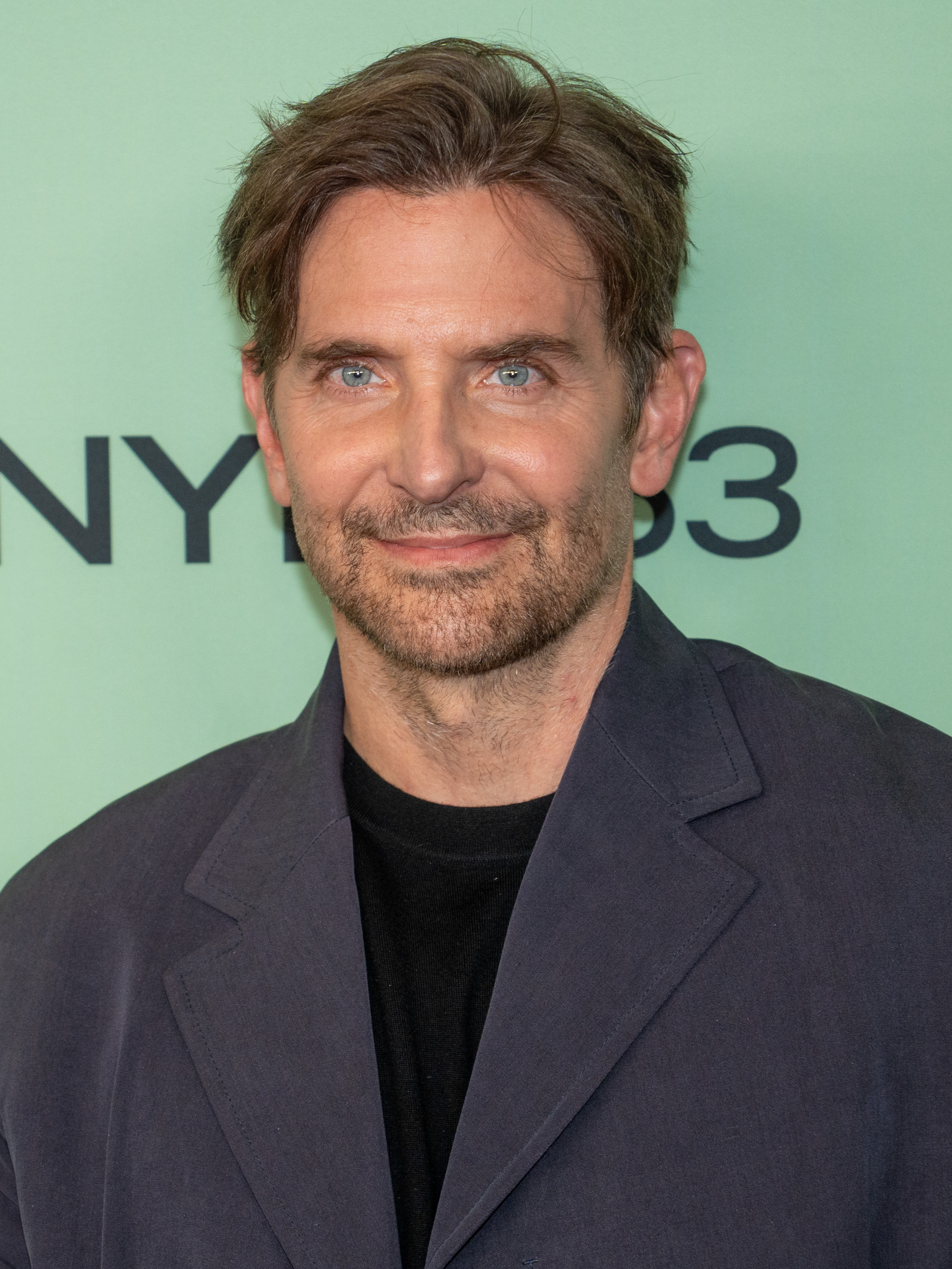
Bradley Cooper, Best Comedic Performance winner

Winners are listed at the top of each list in bold, while the runner-ups and nominees for each category are listed under them.

Best Picture	Best Director
**The Power of the Dog**: Runner-Up: Belfast; CODA; Dune; Mass	**Jane Campion – The Power of the Dog**: Runner-Up: Kenneth Branagh – Belfast; Guillermo del Toro – Nightmare Alley; Maggie Gyllenhaal – The Lost Daughter; Denis Villeneuve – Dune
Best Actor	Best Actress
**Nicolas Cage – Pig as Robin "Rob" Feld**: Runner-Up: Andrew Garfield – tick, tick... BOOM! as Jonathan Larson; Benedict Cumberbatch – The Power of the Dog as Phil Burbank; Peter Dinklage – Cyrano as Cyrano de Bergerac; Jude Hill – Belfast as Buddy	**Caitríona Balfe – Belfast as Ma (TIE)**; **Penélope Cruz – Parallel Mothers as Janis Martinez (TIE)**: Olivia Colman – The Lost Daughter as Leda Caruso; Emilia Jones – CODA as Ruby Rossi; Kristen Stewart – Spencer as Diana, Princess of Wales
Best Supporting Actor	Best Supporting Actress
**Jason Isaacs – Mass as Jay Perry**: Runner-Up: Ben Affleck – The Tender Bar as Charlie Moehringer; Ciarán Hinds – Belfast as Pop; Troy Kotsur – CODA as Frank Rossi; Kodi Smit-McPhee – The Power of the Dog as Peter Gordon	**Ruth Negga – Passing as Clare Bellew**: Runner-Up: Ariana DeBose – West Side Story as Anita; Cate Blanchett – Nightmare Alley as Dr. Lilith Ritter; Ann Dowd – Mass as Linda; Martha Plimpton – Mass as Gail Perry
Best Adapted Screenplay	Best Original Screenplay
**Jane Campion – The Power of the Dog**: Runner-Up: Guillermo del Toro and Kim Morgan – Nightmare Alley; Joel Coen – The Tragedy of Macbeth; Rebecca Hall – Passing; Sian Heder – CODA	**Fran Kranz – Mass**: Runner-Up: Kenneth Branagh – Belfast; Runner-Up: Adam McKay – Don't Look Up; Pedro Almodóvar – Parallel Mothers; Michael Sarnoski – Pig
Best Breakthrough Artist	Best Comedic Performance
**Emilia Jones – CODA**: Runner-Up: Jude Hill – Belfast; Alana Haim – Licorice Pizza; Fran Kranz – Mass; Anthony Ramos – In the Heights	**Bradley Cooper – Licorice Pizza as Jon Peters**: Runner-Up: David Harbour – Black Widow as Alexei Shostakov / Red Guardian; Leonardo DiCaprio – Don't Look Up as Dr. Randall Mindy; Jamie Dornan – Barb and Star Go to Vista Del Mar as Edgar Paget; Simon Rex – Red Rocket as Mikey Saber
Best Animated Film	Best Documentary
**Luca**: Runner-Up: Flee; Encanto; The Mitchells vs. the Machines; Raya and the Last Dragon	**Summer of Soul (...Or, When the Revolution Could Not Be Televised)**: Runner-Up: Flee; My Name Is Pauli Murray; Val; The Velvet Underground
Best International Film	Best Ensemble
**Drive My Car**: Runner-Up: I'm Your Man; Lamb; Parallel Mothers; The Worst Person in the World	**Don't Look Up**: Dune; The Harder They Fall; In the Heights; Mass
Best Cinematography	Best Editing
**Greig Fraser – Dune**: Runner-Up: Bruno Delbonnel – The Tragedy of Macbeth; Alice Brooks – In the Heights; Dan Laustsen – Nightmare Alley; Ari Wegner – The Power of the Dog	**Myron Kerstein – In the Heights**: Runner-Up: Úna Ní Dhonghaíle – Belfast; Geraud Brisson – CODA; Joshua L. Pearson – Summer of Soul (...Or, When the Revolution Could Not Be Televised); Joe Walker – Dune
Best Costumes	Best Production Design
**Jenny Beavan – Cruella**: Runner-Up: Antoinette Messam – The Harder They Fall; Odile Dicks-Mireaux – Last Night in Soho; Bob Morgan and Jacqueline West – Dune; Janty Yates – House of Gucci	**Tamara Deverell – Nightmare Alley**: Runner-Up: Rena DeAngelo and Adam Stockhausen – The French Dispatch; Jim Clay – Belfast; Grant Major – The Power of the Dog; Richard Roberts, Zsuzsanna Sipos, and Patrice Vermette – Dune
Best Sound Design	Best Visual Effects
**Theo Green and Dave Whitehead – Dune**: Runner-Up: Erik Aadahl and Ethan Van der Ryn – A Quiet Place Part II; Runner-Up: Simon Chase and James Mather – Belfast; Runner-Up: Dave Whitehead – The Power of the Dog; Nathan Robitaille – Nightmare Alley	**Dune**: The Green Knight; Nightmare Alley; Shang-Chi and the Legend of the Ten Rings; Spider-Man: No Way Home
Best Use of Music	Best Youth Performance (Performers under the age of 16)
**Last Night in Soho**: Runner-Up: Belfast; Runner-Up: In the Heights; Runner-Up: West Side Story; Cruella	**Jude Hill – Belfast as Buddy**: Runner-Up: Mckenna Grace – Ghostbusters: Afterlife as Phoebe Spengler; Runner-Up: Saniyya Sidney – King Richard as Venus Williams; Daniel Ranieri – The Tender Bar as Young JR; Demi Singleton – King Richard as Serena Williams
Best Body of Work
**Jonny Greenwood (Licorice Pizza, The Power of the Dog, and Spencer)**
