= Vanessa Block =

American filmmaker

- Education: Yale University; Keck School of Medicine of USC
- Occupations: Film director; Producer; Screenwriter
- Years active: 2015–present

Vanessa Block is an American film director and producer who wrote the story for 2021 film Pig with Michael Sarnoski and was one of the film's producers. Prior to Pig, she directed the short documentary The Testimony, which was one of the 10 short-listed considerations for five available nominations for the Academy Award for Best Documentary Short Film.

== Background ==
Block went to Yale University and pursued a degree in chemistry, and also enrolled in the pre-medical track, to become a physician. She enjoyed writing screenplays as a hobby and met Sarnoski who was producing a zombie-themed short film. Block went on to Keck School of Medicine of USC to pursue a master's degree in global medicine and became motivated to make a documentary about sexual violence in the Congo. She wrote, produced, and edited The Testimony, and Sarnoski helped as editor and executive producer. After The Testimony, she launched the BlockBox Entertainment banner, under which Pig was produced. She wrote the story for Pig with Sarnoski, who then wrote the screenplay and directed the film.

== Credits ==
Block's credits
Year	Title	Medium	Notes
2015	The Testimony	Short documentary	Wrote, produced, directed
2021	Pig	Feature film	Story credit with Michael Sarnoski; producer

== Accolades ==
Vanessa Block received several awards and nominations for Pig.

Accolades received by Vanessa Block for Pig
Award	Ceremony	Result	Ref.
Austin Film Critics Association Award for Best Original Screenplay with Michael Sarnoski	2021 ceremony	Won	
Gotham Independent Film Award for Best Feature with Michael Sarnoski, et al.	2021 ceremony	Nominated	
Independent Spirit Award for Best First Screenplay with Michael Sarnoski	37th ceremony	Won	
Online Film Critics Society Award for Best Original Screenplay with Michael Sarnoski	2021 ceremony	Won	
