= Online Film Critics Society Award for Best Original Screenplay =

Annual film award

The Online Film Critics Society Award for Best Original Screenplay is an annual film award given by the Online Film Critics Society to honor the best screenplay (written directly for the screen) of the year.

Awarded for the first time in 1975 as a special prize and starting the following year as a competitive prize, it was occasionally awarded in the editions of 1975-1977, 1980-1982, 1990-1992 and 2007, otherwise being replaced by the awards dedicated to the best screenplay, original and not original.

== Winners ==
=== 1990s ===
Year	Winner	Writer(s)
1998	The Truman Show	Andrew Niccol
1999	Being John Malkovich	Charlie Kaufman

=== 2000s ===
Year	Winner	Writer(s)
2000	No information	
2001	Mulholland Drive	David Lynch
2001	The Others	Alejandro Amenábar
2002	Far from Heaven	Todd Haynes
2003	Lost in Translation	Sofia Coppola
2004	Eternal Sunshine of the Spotless Mind	Charlie Kaufman
2005	Good Night, and Good Luck.	George Clooney and Grant Heslov
2006	Pan's Labyrinth (El laberinto del fauno)	Guillermo del Toro
2007	Juno	Diablo Cody
2008	WALL-E	Jim Reardon and Andrew Stanton
2009	Inglourious Basterds	Quentin Tarantino

=== 2010s ===
Year	Winner	Writer(s)
2010	Inception	Christopher Nolan
2011	Midnight in Paris	Woody Allen
2012	Moonrise Kingdom	Wes Anderson and Roman Coppola
2013	Her	Spike Jonze
2014	The Grand Budapest Hotel	Wes Anderson
2015	Spotlight	Tom McCarthy and Josh Singer
2016	Hell or High Water	Taylor Sheridan
2017	Get Out	Jordan Peele
2018	Sorry to Bother You	Boots Riley
2019	Parasite	Bong Joon-ho and Han Jin-won

=== 2020s ===
Year	Winner	Writer(s)
2020	Promising Young Woman	Emerald Fennell
2021	Pig	Michael Sarnoski and Vanessa Block
2022	The Banshees of Inisherin	Martin McDonagh
2023	The Holdovers	David Hemingson
