= Pig (2021 film) =

American film by Michael Sarnoski

- Theatrical release poster
- Directed by: Michael Sarnoski
- Screenplay by: Michael Sarnoski
- Story by: Vanessa Block; Michael Sarnoski
- Produced by: David Carrico; Adam Paulsen; Nicolas Cage; Ben Giladi; Steve Tisch; Vanessa Block; Dimitra Tsingou; Thomas Benski; Dori A. Rath; Joseph Restaino
- Starring: Nicolas Cage; Alex Wolff; Adam Arkin
- Cinematography: Pat Scola
- Edited by: Brett W. Bachman
- Music by: Alexis Grapsas; Philip Klein
- Production companies: Endeavor Content; AI Film; Pulse Films; BlockBox Entertainment; Valparaiso Pictures; Saturn Films; Liminal Content
- Distributed by: Neon
- Release date: July 16, 2021
- Running time: 92 minutes
- Country: United States
- Language: English
- Budget: $3 million
- Box office: $4.6 million

Pig is a 2021 American drama film written and directed by Michael Sarnoski (in his feature directorial debut), from a story by Vanessa Block and Sarnoski. The film stars Nicolas Cage as a truffle-hunter who lives alone in the Oregon wilderness and must return to his past in Portland in search of his beloved foraging pig after she is kidnapped. It also stars Alex Wolff and Adam Arkin.

Pig was theatrically released in the United States on July 16, 2021, by Neon. Critics praised its screenplay and Cage's performance. It won the Independent Spirit Award for Best First Screenplay and earned Cage a second nomination for the Critics' Choice Movie Award for Best Actor.

== Plot ==
Robin "Rob" Feld is a reclusive truffle-forager who was once a renowned chef in Portland. Living in a cabin deep in the Oregon forests, he hunts for truffles with the help of his prized foraging pig. Rob sells the truffles exclusively to Amir, a young and inexperienced supplier of luxury ingredients to high-end restaurants.

One night, Rob is attacked by unidentified assailants who beat him down before stealing his pig. He contacts Amir, who helps him locate a pair of bedraggled drug addicts suspected by another truffle hunter. The pair admit to the theft but say they did it only for the money and that the pig was taken to Portland.

After his old friend Edgar refuses to help, Rob leads Amir to an underground fighting ring for restaurant people below the defunct Portland Hotel, saying certain names carry cachet. Rob identifies himself to the crowd before allowing a man to beat him severely, in exchange for information from Edgar.

Shocked to learn his identity, the following morning Amir reveals that his parents had such a miserable marriage that the only happy time he remembers is a night when they had dinner at Rob's restaurant, before his mother died by suicide. Rob asks Amir to secure reservations at Eurydice, a trendy haute cuisine restaurant Amir's father does business with. Rob visits the house he used to live in with his wife Lori, whose death compelled Rob to withdraw to the woods.

At Eurydice, Rob asks to meet with its head chef, Derek, a former prep cook at Rob's restaurant. Rob pointedly yet empathetically criticizes Derek for opening a contemporary restaurant rather than the pub he always wanted to run. Overwhelmed by the memory of his dream and the reality of his current circumstances, Derek confesses that Amir's wealthy father, Darius, was behind the theft of Rob's pig, having learned of its existence from Amir. Rob angrily ends his partnership with Amir before going to confront Darius at his home. Darius offers Rob $25,000 in exchange for the pig and threatens to kill it if Rob continues his pursuit.

Rob leaves, finding Amir waiting outside, having just left his comatose mother in a care facility, revealing she is still alive. Rob admits he does not need his pig to hunt truffles, because the trees tell him where they are; he wants to find her simply because he loves her. He gives Amir a list of items and tells him to use Rob's name to obtain them.

Rob visits his former baker for a salted baguette and a few pastries he shares with Amir before they go back to Darius's house. Rob guides Amir as they prepare the same meal for Darius that Rob served to him and his wife, including a rare wine from Rob's personal collection, which Amir obtained from the woman caring for the mausoleum containing Lori's ashes.

All three men sit down to eat together, despite Darius's resistance. An emotional Darius leaves the table after just a few tastes. When Rob follows and confronts him, Darius asks why he is doing this, and Rob says he remembers every meal he ever cooked and every person he ever served. Darius tearfully confesses that the junkies he hired for the theft mishandled the pig, resulting in her death. Rob collapses in tears, and a remorseful Amir drives him back to a diner near Rob's home in the forest. Despite Amir's foolishness, Rob says he will see him next Thursday.

Returning to his forest, Rob washes his bloody face in the lake, before returning to his cabin to play a tape Lori recorded of herself singing Bruce Springsteen's "I'm on Fire" to him for his birthday.

== Cast ==
- Nicolas Cage as Robin "Rob" Feld
- Alex Wolff as Amir
- Adam Arkin as Darius
- Nina Belforte as Charlotte
- Gretchen Corbett as Mac
- David Knell as Chef Derek Finway
- Darius Pierce as Edgar

== Production ==
Sarnoski was inspired to create the film after seeing a photograph of a truffle hunter on a porch with his pig. He briefly considered whether to set the film in France or Spain, but ultimately decided to set it in Oregon owing to the truffle industry in the Pacific Northwest. The film is divided into three parts, which was inspired by the three courses of a meal. The film's theme of loss was influenced by the death of Sarnoski's father.

Editor Brett Bachman grew up outside of Seattle, which contributed to the idea of the character Rob saying "fuck Seattle" in a key moment during the film. The film's score and editing were designed to reflect the protagonist passing through different "realms" throughout the film, traveling from his secluded wilderness home to the city of his old life. Composers Alexis Grapsas and Philip Klein used acoustic instruments and warm sounds, such as a baritone violin, to represent Rob's peaceful wilderness home.

In September 2019, it was announced Nicolas Cage and Alex Wolff had joined the cast of the film, with Michael Sarnoski directing from a screenplay he wrote. Principal photography began September 23, 2019, in Portland, Oregon, lasting 20 days.

In an interview, Michael Sarnoski mentioned giving Nicolas Cage some books to read that reflected aspects of his character and the film, including the graphic novel Asterios Polyp by David Mazzucchelli, and the memoir The Devil in the Kitchen by Marco Pierre White. To prepare for the role, Nicolas Cage trained with local chefs Christopher Czarnecki and Gabriel Rucker. Sarnoski stated that he would have been willing to hire a lesser-known lead actor due to the film's small budget, but ultimately chose Cage for his commitment to the role.

== Release ==
In March 2020, Neon acquired U.S. distribution rights to the film. Pig had a limited theatrical release in the United States on July 16, 2021, followed by screenings in the UK and Republic of Ireland on August 20, 2021.

=== Soundtrack ===
The soundtrack for the film was composed by Alexis Grapsas and Philip Klein and released through Lakeshore Records on July 16, 2021.

== Reception ==
=== Box office ===
The film grossed $945,000 in 552 theaters in its first opening weekend and $565,000 in its second weekend.

=== Critical response ===
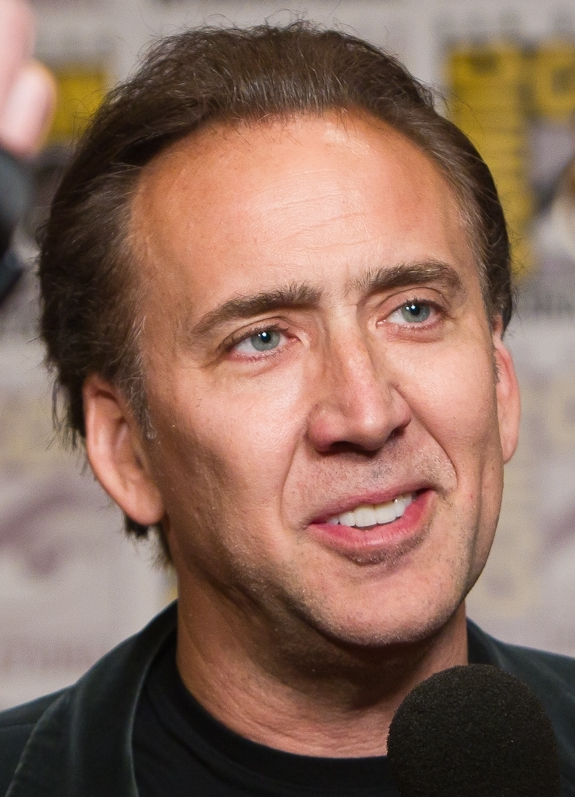
Nicolas Cage's performance garnered widespread critical acclaim.

On the review aggregator website Rotten Tomatoes, 97% of 268 critics' reviews are positive, with an average rating of 8.2/10. The site's critics consensus reads, "Like the animal itself, Pig defies the hogwash of expectations with a beautiful odyssey of loss and love anchored by Nicolas Cage's affectingly raw performance." On Metacritic, the film has a weighted average score of 82 out of 100, based on 39 critics, indicating "universal acclaim".

Richard Roeper of the Chicago Sun-Times gave the film a score of four out of four stars, writing: "The unpredictable Cage delivers some of his best work in years." Bilge Ebiri of Vulture gave the film a positive review and stated, "As it proceeds, it expands its vision and compassion, even as it de-escalates the tension. It's not about the thing it's about, except that it ultimately is totally about the thing it's about." Richard Whittaker of The Austin Chronicle gave the film four-and-a-half out of five stars and stated, "At a time when so many people are struggling to find something of value in their lives, when people are fleeing jobs, cities, futures they thought they wanted, Cage has crafted a quiet soliloquy about grasping onto something that has meaning."

Thelma Adams of AARP Movies for Grownups gave the film four out of five stars and stated, "Playing oddly against expectations, there's no Cage Rage, no showy violence or operatic monologues, just a simple, moving story of a broken man who lost his pig but, perhaps, has found his way." Johnny Oleksinski of The New York Post gave the film three out of four stars, calling it "[an] undeniably odd, but surprisingly touching drama."

Karen Han of Slate gave the film a positive review and stated, "Pig is a small film with a few big surprises executed very well, and well worth going into as blind as possible." Mike D'Angelo of The A.V. Club gave the film a grade of "A", writing that "There are no plot twists, in the traditional sense, but each successive encounter reveals a new facet that enriches the tale." Carlos Aguilar of TheWrap gave the film a positive review, writing, "Not all the ingredients make sense together, but the product of their intermingling inside the filmmaker's narrative plot render a special concoction." Noel Murray, in his review of the film for the Los Angeles Times, wrote that, "Though its plot follows the same rough outline of a John Wick-style shoot-em-up, Pig is actually a quiet and often melancholy meditation on loss, anchored by a character who wishes he could shake free of the person he used to be."

Kristy Puchko, in her review of the film for Pajiba, wrote: "Pig is not only a mesmerizing while meditative drama about love and loss. It is also a powerful reminder that Cage is one of the most talented, most captivating movie stars of our time." Cody Corrall of the Chicago Reader gave the film a positive review and stated, "Even through its various webs of tragedy, relentless ambition, and destruction for capital gain—Pig remarkably and overwhelmingly champions care and kindness." Randy Myers of The Mercury News gave the film three-and-a-half out of four stars and stated, "It is Cage who carries Pig with a measured performance in which his trademark outbursts pierce the soul. He's magnificent."

Jeannette Catsoulis of The New York Times gave the film a positive review, writing that, "While Pig can at times feel engulfed by its own sullenness, there's a rigor to the filmmaking and a surreal beauty to Pat Scola's images that seal our investment in Robin's fate." Matt Zoller Seitz of RogerEbert.com gave the film four out of four stars, and wrote: "What a beguiling, confounding film Pig is. From start to finish, it never moves as you might expect it to." Michael O'Sullivan of The Washington Post also gave the film four out of four stars, writing that "Pig's stock in trade is a kind of visual and narrative poetry, and Sarnoski and Block ply it with the skill and light touch of master chefs." The Guardian's Benjamin Lee gave the film three out of five stars and stated, "It... hints at exciting things to come from Sarnoski, a gifted visual filmmaker, who has assembled a promising, if imperfect, debut."

Sheri Linden of The Hollywood Reporter gave the film a positive review, writing: "Whatever the screenplay's stumbles, Cage's contained performance embraces his character's losses and his turning away from the world without the slightest play for sympathy." Chuck Bowen of Slant Magazine gave the film three out of four stars and stated, "Nicolas Cage, in full martyr mode here, seems to get off on the perversity of, well, caging his brand of operatic hysteria." Michael Nordine of Variety gave the film a positive review, concluding that, "As a descent into the apparently high-stakes world of truffle-pig-poaching, Pig is unexpectedly touching; as a showcase for Cage's brilliance, it's a revelation." Lauren Milici of Total Film praised the film, writing: "Blood and weapons aside, the film is a moving meditation on grief and loss, and how sometimes the only way to move on is to return to the place that broke us in the first place."

Ethan Brehm of Spoiler magazine named it the best film of the year.

Cage has stated that Pig is his favorite film that he has starred in to date, and considers it his best performance.

Gary M. Kramer, in a negative review of the film for Salon.com, wrote that "Pig doesn't give viewers much to care about, other than perhaps the title character. Sarnoski's film is undercooked."

==== Retrospective lists ====
The film has been cited among the best drama films of the 2020s by Collider and the best independent films of the 21st century by IndieWire. Collider ranked the film at number 12 on its list of "The 20 Best Drama Movies of the 2020s So Far", writing that the film "showed the world why Cage had become such an icon in the first place; he narrowed his focus and gave one of the most moving performances of his career as the former chef Rob."

=== Accolades ===
Award	Date of ceremony	Category	Recipient(s)	Result	Ref.
Austin Film Critics Association	January 11, 2022	Top Ten Films	Pig	Won	
Austin Film Critics Association	January 11, 2022	Best Film	Pig	Nominated	
Austin Film Critics Association	January 11, 2022	Best Actor	Nicolas Cage	Won	
Austin Film Critics Association	January 11, 2022	Best Original Screenplay	Vanessa Block and Michael Sarnoski	Won	
Austin Film Critics Association	January 11, 2022	Best First Film	Michael Sarnoski	Won	
Chicago Film Critics Association Awards	December 15, 2021	Best Actor	Nicolas Cage	Nominated	
Chicago Film Critics Association Awards	December 15, 2021	Best Original Screenplay	Michael Sarnoski	Nominated	
Chicago Film Critics Association Awards	December 15, 2021	Milos Stehlik Breakthrough Filmmaker Award	Michael Sarnoski	Won	
Coronado Island Film Festival	—N/a	Best Narrative Audience Award	Pig	Won	
Critics' Choice Movie Awards	March 13, 2022	Best Actor	Nicolas Cage	Nominated	
Detroit Film Critics Society Awards	December 6, 2021	Best Actor	Nicolas Cage	Nominated	
Florida Film Critics Circle Awards	December 22, 2021	Best Actor	Nicolas Cage	Nominated	
Florida Film Critics Circle Awards	December 22, 2021	Best First Feature	Pig	Won	
Georgia Film Critics Association Awards	January 14, 2022	Best Actor	Nicolas Cage	Won	
Golden Raspberry Awards	March 26, 2022	Razzie Redeemer Award	Nicolas Cage	Nominated	
Gotham Independent Film Awards	November 29, 2021	Best Feature	Pig	Nominated	
Greater Western New York Film Critics Association	January 1, 2022	Best Picture	Pig	Won	
Greater Western New York Film Critics Association	January 1, 2022	Best Director	Michael Sarnoski	Nominated	
Greater Western New York Film Critics Association	January 1, 2022	Best Lead Actor	Nicolas Cage	Won	
Greater Western New York Film Critics Association	January 1, 2022	Breakthrough Director	Michael Sarnoski	Won	
Independent Spirit Awards	March 6, 2022	Best First Screenplay	Vanessa Block and Michael Sarnoski	Won	
National Board of Review Awards	December 2, 2021	Best Directorial Debut	Michael Sarnoski	Won	
Online Film Critics Society	January 24, 2022	Best Picture	Pig	Nominated	
Online Film Critics Society	January 24, 2022	Best Actor	Nicolas Cage	Nominated	
Online Film Critics Society	January 24, 2022	Best Debut Feature	Michael Sarnoski	Nominated	
Online Film Critics Society	January 24, 2022	Best Original Screenplay	Vanessa Block and Michael Sarnoski	Won	
San Diego Film Critics Society	January 10, 2022	Best Actor	Nicolas Cage	Won	
San Diego Film Critics Society	January 10, 2022	Best Original Screenplay	Michael Sarnoski	Nominated	
San Francisco Bay Area Film Critics Circle	January 10, 2022	Best Actor	Nicolas Cage	Nominated	
Saturn Awards	October 25, 2022	Best Thriller Film	Pig	Nominated	
Seattle Film Critics Society Awards	January 17, 2022	Best Picture	Pig	Nominated	
Seattle Film Critics Society Awards	January 17, 2022	Best Actor	Nicolas Cage	Won	
Seattle Film Critics Society Awards	January 17, 2022	Best Screenplay	Michael Sarnoski	Nominated	
St. Louis Film Critics Association	December 19, 2021	Best Actor	Nicolas Cage	Won	
St. Louis Film Critics Association	December 19, 2021	Best Original Screenplay	Michael Sarnoski and Vanessa Block	Nominated	
Washington D.C. Area Film Critics Association	December 6, 2021	Best Actor	Nicolas Cage	Nominated	
