= List of awards and nominations received by Kristen Stewart =

Kristen Stewart awards and nominations
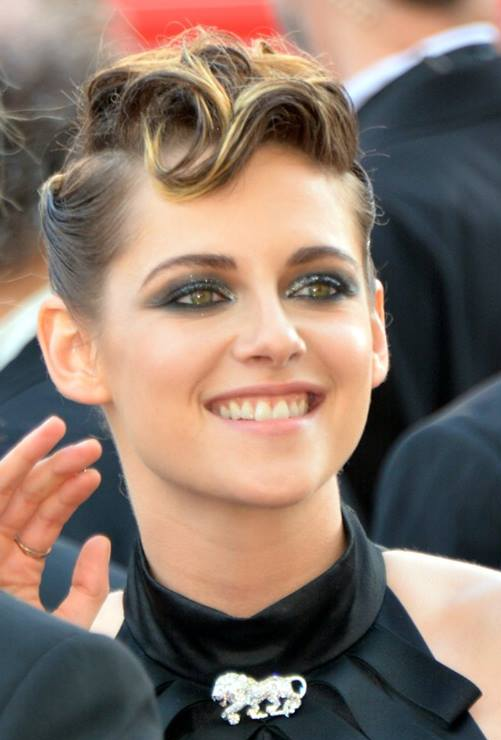
- Stewart at the 2018 Cannes Film Festival
Awards and nominations
Award	Wins	Nominations
Academy Awards	0	1
Actor Awards	0	1
BAFTA Awards	1	1
Critics' Choice Awards	0	1
Golden Globe Awards	0	1

Totals (Note: Certain award groups do not simply award one winner. They acknowledge several different recipients, have runners-up, and have third place. Since this is a specific recognition and is different from losing an award, runner-up mentions are considered wins in this award tally. For simplification and to avoid errors, each award in this list has been presumed to have had a prior nomination.)
- Wins: 72
- Nominations: 140

Kristen Stewart is an American actress and filmmaker, who has received numerous nominations and has won multiple awards, including a BAFTA Award, a César Award and a Gotham Award. Stewart rose to fame with the lead role as Bella Swan in The Twilight Saga, for her work in the franchise, she received seven MTV Movie Awards, three People's Choice Awards, ten Teen Choice Awards and the BAFTA Rising Star Award.

In 2014, Stewart received critical acclaim for her performance in Olivier Assayas' drama film Clouds of Sils Maria, for which she won the César Award for Best Supporting Actress, alongside various critics association awards. In 2021, she received critical acclaim for her portrayal of Diana, Princess of Wales in Pablo Larraín's biopic Spencer, for which she received nominations for the Golden Globe Award, Critics Choice Award, and Academy Award for Best Actress, amongst numerous others.

== Major associations ==
=== Academy Awards ===
Also known as the Oscars, the Academy Awards are awards for artistic and technical merit in the film industry. They are regarded by many as the most prestigious and significant awards in the entertainment industry worldwide and are given annually by the Academy of Motion Picture Arts and Sciences (AMPAS). Stewart has been nominated once.

Year	Category	Nominated work	Result	Ref.
2022	Best Actress	Spencer	Nominated	

=== AACTA Awards ===
The Australian Academy of Cinema and Television Arts Awards, known as the AACTA Awards, are presented annually by the Australian Academy of Cinema and Television Arts to recognise excellence in the film and television industry both locally and internationally. Stewart has been nominated once.

Year	Category	Nominated work	Result	Ref.
2022	Best Actress	Spencer	Nominated	

=== British Academy Film Awards ===
The British Academy Film Awards are presented in an annual award show hosted by the British Academy of Film and Television Arts (BAFTA).

Year	Category	Nominated work	Result	Ref.
2010	BAFTA Rising Star Award	—	Won	

=== César Awards ===
The César Awards are the national film awards of France. It is delivered in the Nuit des César ceremony and was first awarded in 1976. The nominations are selected by the members of twelve categories of filmmaking professionals and supported by the French Ministry of Culture.

Year	Category	Nominated work	Result	Ref.
2015	Best Supporting Actress	Clouds of Sils Maria	Won	

=== Golden Globe Awards ===
The Golden Globe Awards are accolades bestowed by the members of the Hollywood Foreign Press Association beginning in January 1944, recognizing excellence in both American and international film and television.

Year	Category	Nominated work	Result	Ref.
2022	Best Actress in a Motion Picture – Drama	Spencer	Nominated	

=== Screen Actors Guild Awards ===
The Screen Actors Guild Awards are organized by the Screen Actors Guild-American Federation of Television and Radio Artists. First awarded in 1995, the awards aim to recognize excellent achievements in film and television.

Year	Category	Nominated work	Result	Ref.
2008	Outstanding Performance by a Cast in a Motion Picture	Into the Wild	Nominated	

== Industry awards ==
=== Chlotrudis Awards ===
The Chlotrudis Society for Independent Film is a non-profit organization that honors outstanding achievement in independent and foreign films.

Year	Category	Nominated work	Result	Ref.
2016	Best Supporting Actress	Clouds of Sils Maria	Nominated	
2017	Best Performance by an Ensemble Cast (shared with the ensemble cast)	Certain Women	Nominated	

=== Critics' Choice Movie Awards ===
The Critics' Choice Movie Awards (formerly known as the Broadcast Film Critics Association Awards) honor the best in cinematic achievement, presented annually by the Critics Choice Association.

Year	Category	Nominated work	Result	Ref.
2022	Best Actress	Spencer	Nominated	

=== Gotham Independent Film Awards ===
Presented by the Independent Filmmaker Project, the Gotham Independent Film Awards award the best in independent film.

Year	Category	Nominated work	Result	Ref.
2009	Best Ensemble Performance	Adventureland	Nominated	
2021	Performer Tribute Award	Body of work	Won	

=== Satellite Awards ===
The Satellite Awards are given by the International Press Academy that are commonly noted in entertainment industry journals and blogs.

Year	Category	Nominated work	Result	Ref.
2022	Best Actress in a Motion Picture – Drama	Spencer	Won	

=== Young Artist Awards ===
The Young Artist Award (originally known as the Youth In Film Award) is an accolade bestowed by the Young Artist Association, a non-profit organization founded in 1978 to honor excellence of youth performers, and to provide scholarships for young artists who may be physically and/or financially challenged.

Year	Category	Nominated work	Result	Ref.
2003	Best Leading Young Actress in a Feature Film	Panic Room	Nominated	
2004	Best Supporting Young Actress in a Feature Film	Cold Creek Manor	Nominated	
2005	Best Supporting Young Actress in a Feature Film	Undertow	Nominated	
2008	Best Supporting Young Actress in a Feature Film	Into the Wild	Nominated	

== Film festival awards ==
Year	Association	Category	Nominated work	Result	Ref.
2011	Milan Film Festival	Best Actress	Welcome to the Rileys	Won	
2016	Oaxaca FilmFest	Best Actress	Personal Shopper	Won	
2017	Sundance Film Festival	Short Film Grand Jury	Come Swim	Nominated	
2019	Deauville American Film Festival	Deauville Talent Award	Seberg	Won	
2019	Mill Valley Film Festival	Spotlight Award	Seberg	Won	
2019	Zurich Film Festival	Golden Eye Award	Seberg	Won	
2022	Palm Springs International Film Festival	Spotlight Award	Spencer	Won	
2022	Santa Barbara International Film Festival	American Riveria Award	Body of Work	Won	
2024	Sundance Film Festival	Visionary Award	Body of Work	Won	
2025	Cannes Film Festival	Un Certain Regard Award	The Chronology of Water	Nominated	
2025	Cannes Film Festival	Camera d'Or	The Chronology of Water	Nominated	
2025	Deauville American Film Festival	Grand Prize	The Chronology of Water	Nominated	
2025	Savannah Film Festival	Rising Star Director Award	The Chronology of Water	Won	

== Critics awards ==
Year	Association	Category	Nominated work	Result	Ref.
2003	Online Film & Television Association	Best Youth Performance	Panic Room	Nominated	
2007	Houston Film Critics Society	Best Performance by an Ensemble Cast	Into the Wild	Nominated	
2014	Women Film Critics Circle	Best Actress	Camp X-Ray	Nominated	
2015	IndieWire Critics Poll	Best Supporting Actress	Clouds of Sils Maria	Won	
2015	Village Voice Film Poll	Best Supporting Actress	Clouds of Sils Maria	Won	
2015	Boston Society of Film Critics	Best Supporting Actress	Clouds of Sils Maria	Won	
2015	Boston Online Film Critics Association	Best Supporting Actress	Clouds of Sils Maria	Won	
2015	Florida Film Critics Circle	Best Supporting Actress	Clouds of Sils Maria	Won	
2015	Alliance of Women Film Journalists	Best Actress in a Supporting Role	Clouds of Sils Maria	Won	
2015	National Society of Film Critics	Best Supporting Actress	Clouds of Sils Maria	Won	
2015	New York Film Critics Circle	Best Supporting Actress	Clouds of Sils Maria	Won	
2015	Los Angeles Film Critics Association	Best Supporting Actress	Clouds of Sils Maria	Runner-up	
2015	St. Louis Gateway Film Critics Association	Best Supporting Actress	Clouds of Sils Maria	Runner-up	
2015	Austin Film Critics Association	Best Supporting Actress	Clouds of Sils Maria	Nominated	
2015	Chicago Film Critics Association	Best Supporting Actress	Clouds of Sils Maria	Nominated	
2015	Toronto Film Critics Association	Best Supporting Actress	Clouds of Sils Maria	Nominated	
2015	San Diego Film Critics Society	Best Supporting Actress	Clouds of Sils Maria	Nominated	
2015	London Film Critics' Circle	Supporting Actress of the Year	Clouds of Sils Maria	Nominated	
2015	Online Film Critics Society	Best Supporting Actress	Clouds of Sils Maria	Nominated	
2015	Detroit Film Critics Society	Best Supporting Actress	Clouds of Sils Maria	Nominated	
2016	IndieWire Critics Poll	Best Supporting Actress	Certain Women	8th place	
2016	Village Voice Film Poll	Best Supporting Actress	Certain Women	8th place	
2016	Boston Society of Film Critics	Best Ensemble	Certain Women	Runner-up	
2017	Austin Film Critics Association	Best Actress	Personal Shopper	Nominated	
2017	Dublin Film Critics' Circle	Best Actress	Personal Shopper	Nominated	
2017	IndieWire Critics Poll	Best Actress	Personal Shopper	5th place	
2017	Village Voice Film Poll	Best Lead Performance	Personal Shopper	5th place	
2017	Indiana Film Journalists Association	Best Actress	Personal Shopper	Nominated	
2017	Las Vegas Film Critics Society	Best Actress	Personal Shopper	Nominated	
2017	St. Louis Film Critics Association	Best Actress	Personal Shopper	Nominated	
2020	Hollywood Critics Association	Actress of the Decade	Body of work	Won	
2020	Alliance of Women Film Journalists	She Deserves A New Agent Award	Charlie's Angels / Seberg	Nominated	
2021	Atlanta Film Critics Circle	Best Actress	Spencer	Won	
2021	Boston Online Film Critics Association	Best Actress	Spencer	Won	
2021	Chicago Film Critics Association	Best Actress	Spencer	Won	
2021	Dallas–Fort Worth Film Critics Association	Best Actress	Spencer	Won	
2021	Denver Film Critics Society	Best Actress	Spencer	Won	
2021	DiscussingFilm Critics Awards	Best Actress	Spencer	Won	
2021	Dorian Awards	Best Lead Film Performance	Spencer	Won	
2021	Greater Western New York Film Critics Association	Best Actress	Spencer	Won	
2021	Hawaii Film Critics Society	Best Actress	Spencer	Won	
2021	Hollywood Critics Association	Best Actress	Spencer	Won	
2021	Indiana Film Journalists Association	Best Actress	Spencer	Won	
2021	Internet Film Critics Society	Best Actress	Spencer	Won	
2021	Minnesota Film Critics Alliance	Best Actress	Spencer	Won	
2021	Nevada Film Critics Society	Best Actress	Spencer	Won	
2021	North Dakota Film Society	Best Actress	Spencer	Won	
2021	North Texas Film Critics Association	Best Actress	Spencer	Won	
2021	Online Association of Female Film Critics	Best Actress	Spencer	Won	
2021	Online Film & Television Association	Best Actress	Spencer	Won	
2021	Philadelphia Film Critics Circle	Best Actress	Spencer	Won	
2021	Phoenix Critics Circle	Best Actress	Spencer	Won	
2021	Phoenix Film Critics Society	Best Actress	Spencer	Won	
2021	Portland Critics Association	Best Female Leading Role	Spencer	Won	
2021	Seattle Film Critics Society	Best Actress in a Leading Role	Spencer	Won	
2021	Southeastern Film Critics Association	Best Actress	Spencer	Won	
2021	St. Louis Film Critics Association	Best Actress	Spencer	Won	
2021	Washington D.C. Area Film Critics Association	Best Actress	Spencer	Won	
2021	Women Film Critics Circle	Best Actress	Spencer	Won	
2021	Dublin Film Critics' Circle	Best Actress	Spencer	Runner-up	
2021	IndieWire Critics Poll	Best Performance	Spencer	Runner-up	
2021	International Film Society Critics	Best Actress	Spencer	Runner-up	
2021	Iowa Film Critics Association	Best Actress	Spencer	Runner-up	
2021	Kansas City Film Critics Circle	Best Actress	Spencer	Runner-up	
2021	Toronto Film Critics Association	Best Actress	Spencer	Runner-up	
2021	Alliance of Women Film Journalists	Best Actress	Spencer	Nominated	
2021	Austin Film Critics Association	Best Actress	Spencer	Nominated	
2021	Chicago Indie Critics	Best Actress	Spencer	Nominated	
2021	Detroit Film Critics Society	Best Actress	Spencer	Nominated	
2021	Florida Film Critics Circle	Best Actress	Spencer	Nominated	
2021	Houston Film Critics Society	Best Actress	Spencer	Nominated	
2021	International Cinephile Society	Best Actress	Spencer	Nominated	
2021	Las Vegas Film Critics Society	Best Actress	Spencer	Nominated	
2021	Latino Entertainment Journalists Association	Best Actress	Spencer	Nominated	
2021	London Film Critics' Circle	Actress of the Year	Spencer	Nominated	
2021	Music City Film Critics Association	Best Actress	Spencer	Nominated	
2021	North Carolina Film Critics Association	Best Actress	Spencer	Nominated	
2021	Online Film Critics Society	Best Actress	Spencer	Nominated	
2021	San Diego Film Critics Society	Best Actress	Spencer	Nominated	
2021	San Francisco Bay Area Film Critics Circle	Best Actress	Spencer	Nominated	
2023	International Cinephile Society	Best Supporting Actress	Crimes of the Future	Won	
2023	Fangoria Chainsaw Awards	Best Supporting Actress	Crimes of the Future	Nominated	
2024	Hollywood Critics Association	Best Actress	Love Lies Bleeding	Nominated	

== Audience awards ==
=== MTV Movie Awards ===
The MTV Movie Awards is a film awards show presented annually on MTV. The nominees are decided by producers and executives at MTV. Winners are decided online by the general public.

Year	Category	Nominated work	Result	Ref.
2009	Best Kiss	Twilight	Won (Note: shared with Robert Pattinson)	
2009	Best Female Performance	Twilight	Won	
2010	Best Female Performance	The Twilight Saga: New Moon	Won	
2010	Best Kiss	The Twilight Saga: New Moon	Won	
2010	Best Kiss	The Runaways (shared with Dakota Fanning)	Nominated	
2010	Global Superstar	—N/a	Nominated	
2011	Best Female Performance	The Twilight Saga: Eclipse	Won	
2011	Best Kiss	The Twilight Saga: Eclipse	Won	
2011	Best Kiss	The Twilight Saga: Eclipse	Nominated (Note: shared with Taylor Lautner)	
2012	Best Kiss	The Twilight Saga: Breaking Dawn – Part 1	Won	
2013	Best Hero	Snow White and the Huntsman	Nominated	

=== Nickelodeon Kids' Choice Awards ===
The Nickelodeon Kids' Choice Awards is an American awards show presented annually by Nickelodeon.

Year	Category	Nominated work	Result	Ref.
2010	Cutest Couple	The Twilight Saga: New Moon	Won	
2010	Cutest Couple	The Twilight Saga: New Moon	Nominated	
2011	Favorite Movie Actress	The Twilight Saga: Eclipse	Nominated	
2012	Favorite Movie Actress	The Twilight Saga: Breaking Dawn – Part 1	Won	
2013	Favorite Movie Actress	The Twilight Saga: Breaking Dawn - Part 2	Won	
2013	Favorite Female Buttkicker	Snow White and the Huntsman	Won	

=== People's Choice Awards ===
The People's Choice Awards is an American awards show, recognizing the people and the work of popular culture, voted on by the general public. The show has been held annually since 1975.

Year	Category	Nominated work	Result	Ref.
2010	Favorite Movie Actress	Twilight	Nominated	
2010	Favorite On-Screen Team (shared with Robert Pattinson and Taylor Lautner)	The Twilight Saga	Won	
2011	Favorite Movie Star Under 25	—N/a	Nominated	
2011	Favorite Movie Actress	The Twilight Saga: Eclipse	Won	
2011	Favorite On-Screen Team (shared with Robert Pattinson and Taylor Lautner)	The Twilight Saga: Eclipse	Won	
2013	Favorite Face of Heroism	Snow White and the Huntsman	Nominated	
2013	Favorite On-Screen Chemistry (shared with Chris Hemsworth)	Snow White and the Huntsman	Nominated	

=== Teen Choice Awards ===
The Teen Choice Awards is an annual awards show that airs on the Fox television network. The awards honor the year's biggest achievements in music, movies, sports, television, fashion, and more, voted by teen viewers (ages 13 to 19).

Year	Category	Nominated work	Result	Ref.
2009	Choice Movie Actress: Drama	Twilight	Won	
2009	Choice Movie: Liplock (shared with Robert Pattinson)	Twilight	Won	
2010	Choice Movie: Actress Sci-Fi/Fantasy	The Twilight Saga: New Moon	Won	
2010	Choice Movie: Chemistry (shared with Robert Pattinson)	The Twilight Saga: New Moon	Won	
2010	Choice Movie: Liplock (shared with Robert Pattinson)	The Twilight Saga: New Moon	Won	
2010	Choice Summer: Movie Star - Female	The Twilight Saga: Eclipse	Won	
2010	Choice Movie: Actress Drama	The Runaways	Nominated	
2011	Choice Movie: Actress Sci-Fi/Fantasy	The Twilight Saga: Eclipse	Nominated	
2011	Choice Movie: Liplock (shared with either Robert Pattinson or Taylor Lautner)	The Twilight Saga: Eclipse	Nominated	
2011	Choice Movie: Liplock (shared with either Robert Pattinson or Taylor Lautner)	The Twilight Saga: Eclipse	Nominated	
2012	Choice Movie: Actress Romance	The Twilight Saga: Breaking Dawn – Part 1	Won	
2012	Choice Movie: Actress Sci-Fi/Fantasy	The Twilight Saga: Breaking Dawn – Part 1	Nominated	
2012	Choice Movie: Liplock (shared with Robert Pattinson)	The Twilight Saga: Breaking Dawn – Part 1	Nominated	
2012	Choice Summer Movie Star: Female	Snow White and the Huntsman	Won	
2013	Choice Movie: Actress Romance	The Twilight Saga: Breaking Dawn – Part 2	Won	
2013	Choice Movie: Actress Sci-Fi/Fantasy	The Twilight Saga: Breaking Dawn – Part 2	Won	
2013	Choice Movie: Liplock (shared with Robert Pattinson)	The Twilight Saga: Breaking Dawn – Part 2	Won	
2015	Favorite Drama Actress	Still Alice	Nominated	

== Other awards ==
=== Scream Awards ===
The Scream Awards is an annual awards award show dedicated to the horror, sci-fi, and fantasy genres of feature films.

Year	Category	Nominated work	Result	Ref.
2009	Best Ensemble	Twilight	Nominated	
2009	Best Fantasy Actress	Twilight	Won	
2010	Best Fantasy Actress	The Twilight Saga: Eclipse	Won	
