= Variety's 100 Best Movie Stars of All Time =

2026 list of film stars voted to be the best of all time

In November 2026, film critics Owen Gleiberman, Guy Lodge, Daniel D'Addario, Alison Herman, and Aramide Tinubu collaborated on a listicle ranking the 100 Best Movie Stars of All Time for Variety. Marilyn Monroe topped the ranking, with Gleiberman penning “When she’s onscreen, whatever the role, there is something magical in the luminosity of her presence.”

== Background ==
Owen Gleiberman, Guy Lodge, Daniel D'Addario, Alison Herman, and Aramide Tinubu are all writers employed by Variety, with the former being the publication's chief film critic and one of the leading film critics in Hollywood. In November 2026, they collaborated on a listicle ranking the 100 best actors they deemed to have "movie star status", with their all-time selection including performers from all different periods of film history. Each ranked performer is accompanied by an explanation, penned by one of the five aforementioned writers, as well as "must see" film recommendation.

We all know a movie star when we see one. But how can you tell which stars shine the brightest? Measuring the greatness of a movie star can be like catching lightning in a bottle. It's a process that requires chemistry and finesse, as well as a search for the perfect mix — that fusion of artistry and popularity, history and currency that adds up to the incandescent ideal of stardom. Not every movie star is a great actor; not every great actor is a movie star. Many of the choices on our list reflect that. Yet there’s a magic zone where talent and luminescence fuse. And there’s another overlap that might be even more important: the one between the way these people pop onscreen and the way they dance in our dreams. To choose the 100 Greatest Movie Stars, we had to use our heads, our hearts, our guts, our fantasy lives. We were looking for the stars who magnetize us, the ones who awe and overpower us and make us swoon. The ones we wish we were, and the ones who inspire the ultimate movie-star thought: "That’s who I am."

== Ranking ==
Rank	Performer(s)	Image	Recommended film	Selected by
100	Henry Fonda	Y. Henry Fonda	12 Angry Men	Guy Lodge
99	Sylvester Stallone	Y. Sylvester Stallone	Rocky	Owen Gleiberman
98	Zendaya	Y. Zendaya	Challengers	Gleiberman
97	Alain Delon	Y. Alain Delon	Le Samouraï	Lodge
96	Eddie Murphy	Y. Eddie Murphy	The Nutty Professor	Aramide Tinubu
95	Philip Seymour Hoffman	Y. Philip Seymour Hoffman	Capote	Gleiberman
94	Emma Stone	Y. Emma Stone	La La Land	Gleiberman
93	Joaquin Phoenix	Y. Joaquin Phoenix	Joker	Lodge
92	Shah Rukh Khan		Devdas	Lodge
91	Kristen Stewart		Spencer	Gleiberman
90	Lauren Bacall		To Have and Have Not	Lodge
89	Nicolas Cage		Leaving Las Vegas	Gleiberman
88	Lillian Gish		Broken Blossoms	Lodge
87	Whoopi Goldberg		Ghost	Gleiberman
86	Timothée Chalamet		Marty Supreme	Lodge
85	Burt Reynolds		Smokey and the Bandit	Gleiberman
84	Kate Winslet		Titanic	Daniel D'Addario
83	Robert Pattinson		The Batman	Gleiberman
82	Morgan Freeman		The Shawshank Redemption	Tinubu
81	Liv Ullmann		Scenes from a Marriage	Gleiberman
80	Sean Penn		Dead Man Walking	Gleiberman
79	Divine		Pink Flamingos	Gleiberman
78	Gregory Peck		To Kill a Mockingbird	Tinubu
77	Ryan Gosling		Drive	Tinubu
76	Burt Lancaster		From Here to Eternity	Lodge
75	Pam Grier		Coffy	Gleiberman
74	Robert Downey Jr.		Iron Man	Gleiberman
73	Barbara Stanwyck		Double Indemnity	Lodge
72	Nicole Kidman		Moulin Rouge!	Lodge
71	Matt Damon		The Talented Mr. Ripley	Gleiberman
70	Jack Lemmon		The Apartment	Lodge
69	Dorothy Dandridge		Carmen Jones	Lodge
68	Daniel Day-Lewis		There Will Be Blood	Lodge
67	Robert Mitchum		Out of the Past	Gleiberman
66	Will Smith		Men in Black	Tinubu
65	Michael Caine		Get Carter	Alison Herman
64	Russell Crowe		Gladiator	Gleiberman
63	Faye Dunaway		Bonnie and Clyde	Gleiberman
62	Orson Welles		Citizen Kane	Lodge
61	Elvis Presley		Jailhouse Rock	Gleiberman
60	Sophia Loren		Two Women	Lodge
59	Arnold Schwarzenegger		The Terminator	Lodge
58	Gene Kelly		Singin' in the Rain	D'Addario
57	Jodie Foster		The Silence of the Lambs	D'Addario
56	John Travolta		Saturday Night Fever	Gleiberman
55	The Marx Brothers (Note: Comprising Chico, Harpo, Groucho, Gummo, and Zeppo Marx)		Duck Soup	Gleiberman
54	Robert De Niro		Taxi Driver	Gleiberman
53	Bruce Lee		Enter the Dragon	Gleiberman
52	Joan Crawford		Mildred Pierce	Tinubu
51	Kirk Douglas		Spartacus	Lodge
50	Diane Keaton		Annie Hall	Herman
49	Marcello Mastroianni		La Dolce Vita	Lodge
48	Warren Beatty		Shampoo	Lodge
47	Shirley Temple		Little Miss Marker	Lodge
46	Robin Williams		Dead Poets Society	Herman
45	Steve McQueen		Bullitt	Gleiberman
44	Julie Andrews		The Sound of Music	Gleiberman
43	Marlene Dietrich		Shanghai Express	Lodge
42	Dustin Hoffman		Tootsie	Lodge
41	Fred Astaire and Ginger Rogers (Note: Duo comprising actors Fred Astaire and Ginger Rogers)		Top Hat	D'Addario
40	Jane Fonda		Klute	Herman
39	Rudolph Valentino		Blood and Sand	Lodge
38	Leonardo DiCaprio		Titanic	Herman
37	Catherine Deneuve		Belle de Jour	Lodge
36	James Cagney		White Heat	Gleiberman
35	Vivien Leigh		Gone with the Wind	Lodge
34	Spencer Tracy		Woman of the Year	D'Addario
33	Judy Garland		The Wizard of Oz	Lodge
32	Al Pacino		Dog Day Afternoon	Gleiberman
31	Paul Newman		The Hustler	Lodge
30	Grace Kelly		To Catch a Thief	D'Addario
29	Brad Pitt		Fight Club	Lodge
28	James Stewart		It's a Wonderful Life	Gleiberman
27	Meryl Streep		Sophie's Choice	Gleiberman
26	Audrey Hepburn		Roman Holiday	Lodge
25	Harrison Ford		Raiders of the Lost Ark	Herman
24	Elizabeth Taylor		Who’s Afraid of Virginia Woolf?	D'Addario
23	Sean Connery		Goldfinger	Gleiberman
22	Greta Garbo		Ninotchka	Lodge
21	Robert Redford		Butch Cassidy and the Sundance Kid	Gleiberman
20	Denzel Washington		Malcolm X	Lodge
19	John Wayne		The Searchers	Gleiberman
18	Ingrid Bergman		Notorious	Gleiberman
17	Tom Hanks		Forrest Gump	Gleiberman
16	Bette Davis		All About Eve	Lodge
15	Clark Gable		Gone with the Wind	Lodge
14	James Dean		East of Eden	Lodge
13	Julia Roberts		Pretty Woman	Gleiberman
12	Cary Grant		His Girl Friday	Lodge
11	Clint Eastwood		The Good, the Bad and the Ugly	Gleiberman
10	Barbra Streisand		Funny Girl	Lodge
9	Toshiro Mifune		Seven Samurai	Lodge
8	Tom Cruise		Top Gun	Gleiberman
7	Marlon Brando		On the Waterfront	Lodge
6	Sidney Poitier		In the Heat of the Night	Gleiberman
5	Katharine Hepburn		The Philadelphia Story	Lodge
4	Jack Nicholson		One Flew Over the Cuckoo’s Nest	Gleiberman
3	Charlie Chaplin		The Gold Rush	Gleiberman
2	Humphrey Bogart		Casablanca	Lodge
1	Marilyn Monroe		Gentlemen Prefer Blondes	Gleiberman

== Reception ==
Reception of the listicle has been mostly mixed, with pundits often praising the top placements, while criticizing its shortage of people of color and certain iconic film actors. Black America Web criticized the inclusion for its shortage of African Americans and people of color, with only nine of the 100 (less than 10%) of actors being black and Shah Rukh Khan being the only person of Indian background.

For The A.V. Club, William Hughes also criticized the ranking, while pointing out that the entire idea behind movie stars, and the publication's "I know it when I see it" approach, jepordizes the ranking by pointing out the objectivity of the topic.

== See also ==
- Movie star
