= Darren McGrady =

Chef to the British royal family

- Born: 1962 (age 63–64); Nottinghamshire, England, United Kingdom
- Occupation: Chef
- Years active: 1982–present
- Known for: Chef for the British royal family
- Notable work: Eating Royally; The Royal Chef at Home

Darren McGrady (born 1962) is a chef best known for his role with the British royal family.

== Career ==
McGrady attended culinary school in the United Kingdom, earning the equivalent of a bachelor's degree in culinary arts. After training at the Savoy Hotel in London, in 1982, he served as a royal chef for Elizabeth II, Prince Philip, Princess Diana, Prince William, and Prince Harry for 15 years. He typically travelled with the royal family among Windsor Castle, Sandringham House, and Balmoral Castle. From 1993, he worked as the personal chef to Princess Diana and her children until her death in 1997.

In 1998, McGrady moved to Dallas, Texas, where he established the catering company Eating Royally.

== Popular culture ==
He was portrayed by Sean Harris in the 2021 film Spencer, which focuses on the life of Diana Spencer after her marriage to Prince Charles. McGrady also has a YouTube channel with 300,000 subscribers.

He has authored two books:

- Eating Royally: recipes and remembrances from a palace kitchen, 2007
- The Royal Chef at Home: easy, seasonal, entertaining, 2017

He has appeared in several television specials and films, including:

- On the Record
- The Great British Breakfast
- Diana: Last Days of a Princess
- The Oprah Winfrey Show
- Larry King Live
- Style Queens, 2016
- Elizabeth: Her Passions and Pastimes, 2023
