= Kristen Stewart =

American actress and director (born 1990)

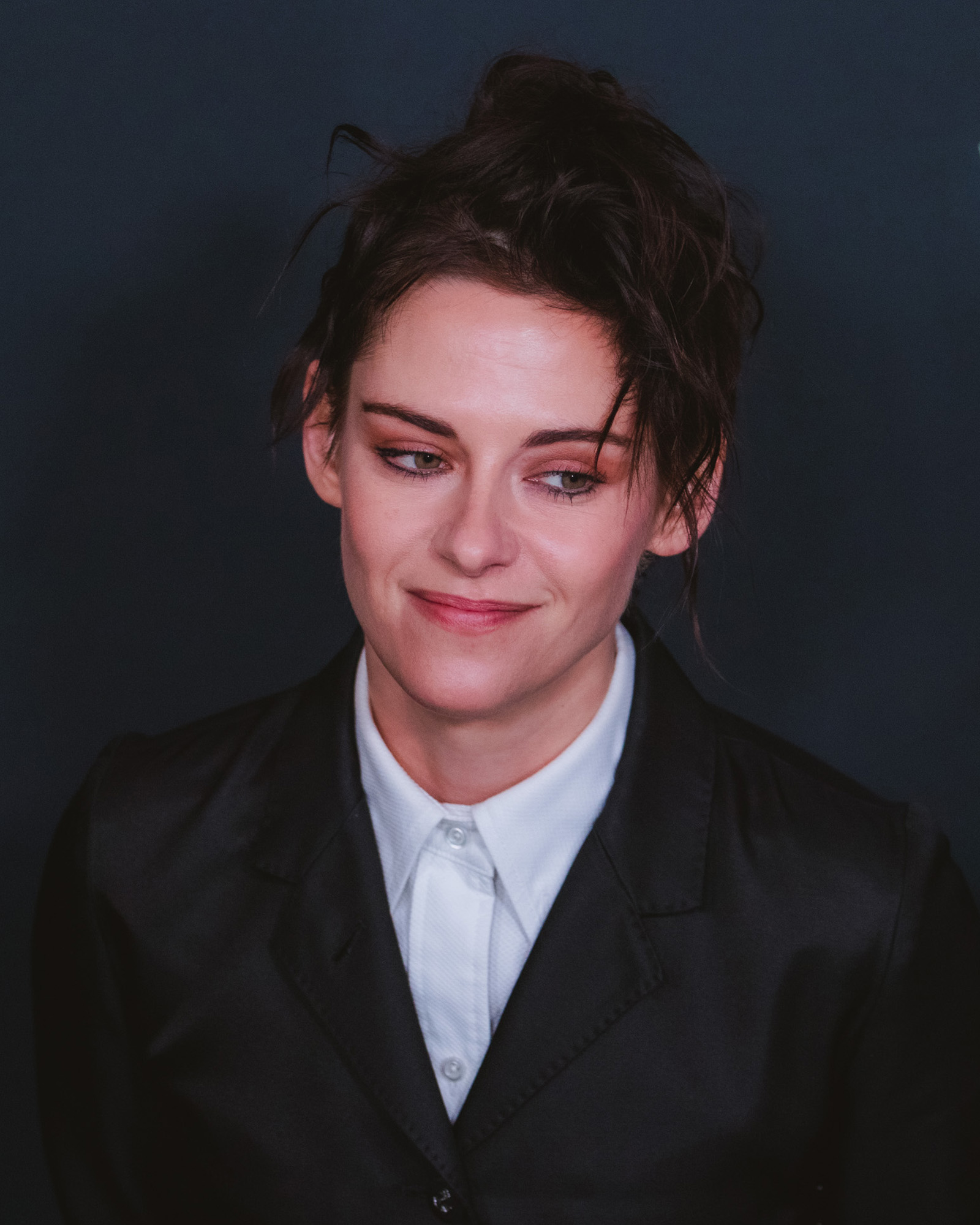
- Stewart in 2026
- Born: Kristen Jaymes Stewart; April 9, 1990 (age 36); Los Angeles, California, U.S.
- Occupations: Actress; filmmaker
- Years active: 1999–present
- Spouse: Dylan Meyer (m. 2025)
- Relatives: Nicholas Meyer (father-in-law)
- Awards: Full list

Kristen Jaymes Stewart (born April 9, 1990) is an American actress and filmmaker. Known for her work in blockbusters and arthouse dramas, Stewart has been ranked among the world's highest paid actors and her films have collectively grossed over $4 billion worldwide. Her accolades include a British Academy Film Award and a César Award, in addition to nominations for an Academy Award and a Golden Globe Award. In November 2026, Variety named her one of the 100 best film stars of all time.

Born and raised in Los Angeles to parents who both worked in the entertainment industry, Stewart's breakthrough came at age 12 with her starring role in David Fincher's thriller Panic Room (2002), followed by roles in the films Speak (2004), Zathura: A Space Adventure (2005), and Into the Wild (2007). She achieved international stardom for portraying Bella Swan in The Twilight Saga film series. Its five films—released yearly between 2008 and 2012—collectively grossed over $3.3 billion worldwide. She also led the dark fantasy film Snow White and the Huntsman (2012).

Stewart ventured away from major-studio productions in favor of dramatic roles in independent films. She earned praise for her performances in The Runaways (2010), Camp X-Ray (2014), Clouds of Sils Maria (2014), Personal Shopper (2016), Seberg (2019), and Love Lies Bleeding (2024). She received a nomination for the Academy Award for Best Actress for her portrayal of Diana, Princess of Wales in the biographical drama Spencer (2021).

As a director, Stewart's early credits include music videos and the short film Come Swim (2017). She made her film debut with The Chronology of Water, which premiered in the Un Certain Regard section of the 2025 Cannes Film Festival on May 16, 2025. The film received largely positive reviews from critics.

== Early life ==
Kristen Jaymes Stewart was born in Los Angeles, California on April 9, 1990. Her father, John Stewart, is a stage manager and television producer. Her mother, Jules Mann-Stewart, is a script supervisor and filmmaker. Jules, an Australian native from Maroochydore, Queensland, had studied at the University of Sydney before moving to Hollywood at the age of 16.

Jules had been adopted by a Jewish couple, Norma and Ben Urman, in 1953 in California. In a November 2019 interview, Stewart said that a 23andMe DNA test had suggested that she had approximately 24% Ashkenazi Jewish ancestry.

Stewart has an older brother, Cameron B. Stewart, and two adopted brothers, Dana and Taylor. In 2012, Stewart's mother filed for divorce from John after 27 years of marriage.

Stewart grew up in the San Fernando Valley. She attended local schools until the seventh grade.

As she became more involved in acting, she continued her education by distance until graduating from high school. Since she was raised in a family who work as non-actors in the entertainment industry, Stewart thought she would become a screenwriter or a director, but never considered being an actor. She said: "I never wanted to be the center of attention—I wasn't that 'I want to be famous, I want to be an actor' kid. I never sought out acting, but I always practiced my autograph because I love pens. I'd write my name on everything."

== Career ==
=== Career beginnings and breakthrough (2000s) ===
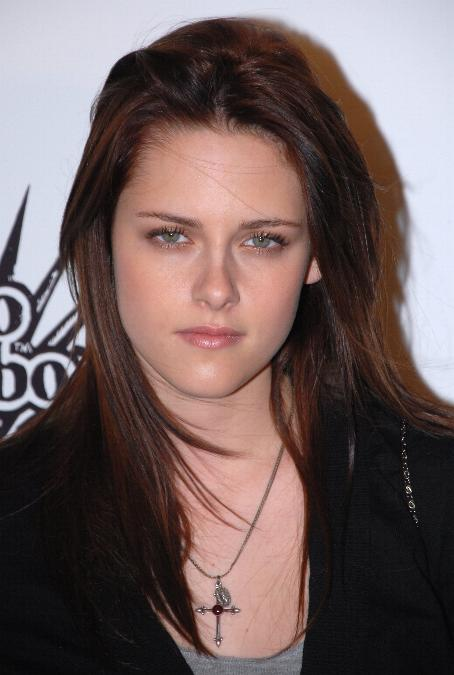
Stewart in 2007

Stewart began acting at age eight, after an agent saw her perform in her elementary school's Christmas play. After auditioning for a year, she got her first role with a small, nonspeaking part in the Disney Channel television film The Thirteenth Year. Her next film was The Flintstones in Viva Rock Vegas, where she played the "ring toss girl". She also appeared in the independent film The Safety of Objects (2001), as the tomboy daughter of a troubled single mother (Patricia Clarkson). Stewart also played the tomboy, diabetic daughter of a divorced mother (Jodie Foster) in the thriller film Panic Room (2002), directed by David Fincher. She was nominated for a Young Artist Award for her performance. Following the success of Panic Room, Stewart was cast in another thriller, Cold Creek Manor (2003), playing the daughter of Dennis Quaid and Sharon Stone's characters and receiving a Young Artist Award nomination for her performance. at 13, she dropped out of school and switched to homeschooling.

At age fourteen, Stewart had her first starring role in the children's action-comedy Catch That Kid (2004), opposite Max Thieriot and Corbin Bleu. That year, Stewart also played the role of Lila in the thriller, Undertow (2004). Stewart starred in the Lifetime/Showtime television film Speak (2004), based on the novel by the same name by Laurie Halse Anderson. Stewart, aged thirteen at the time of filming, played Melinda Sordino, a high school freshman who nearly stops speaking after being raped. Her performance was widely praised. The New York Times said, "Ms. Stewart creates a convincing character full of pain and turmoil."

Stewart appeared in the fantasy-adventure film Zathura: A Space Adventure (2005), playing the role of Lisa Budwing, the irresponsible older sister of two little boys. While playing a board game, they turn their house into a spacecraft hurtling uncontrollably in outer space. The film was praised by critics, but Stewart's performance did not draw much media attention. Her character is immobilized during most of the film. The following year, she played the character Maya in Fierce People (2006), directed by Griffin Dunne. After that film, she received the lead role of Jess Solomon in the supernatural thriller film The Messengers.

Stewart appeared as teenager Lucy Hardwicke in In the Land of Women (2007), a romantic drama starring Meg Ryan and Adam Brody. That same year, Stewart had a small role in the Sean Penn-directed adaptation Into the Wild, portraying Tracy—a teenage singer who has a crush on young adventurer Christopher McCandless (played by Emile Hirsch). While Stephanie Zacharek of Salon.com considered her work a "sturdy, sensitive performance", and the Chicago Tribune's Michael Phillips noted that she did "vividly well with a sketch of a role", Variety critic Dennis Harvey said, "It's unclear whether Stewart means to be playing hippie-chick Tracy as vapid, or whether it just comes off that way." The film received Screen Actors Guild nomination for Outstanding Performance by a Cast in a Motion Picture. After Into the Wild, Stewart had a cameo appearance in Jumper and also appeared in What Just Happened, which was released in October 2008. She co-starred in The Cake Eaters, an independent film that has been screened only at film festivals. The film received positive reviews. Critic Bill Goodykoontz from The Arizona Republic said that Stewart "really shines.... She excels at both aspects of the performance, giving Georgia a strength that defies any sort of pity one might feel for her, without letting us forget her vulnerability".

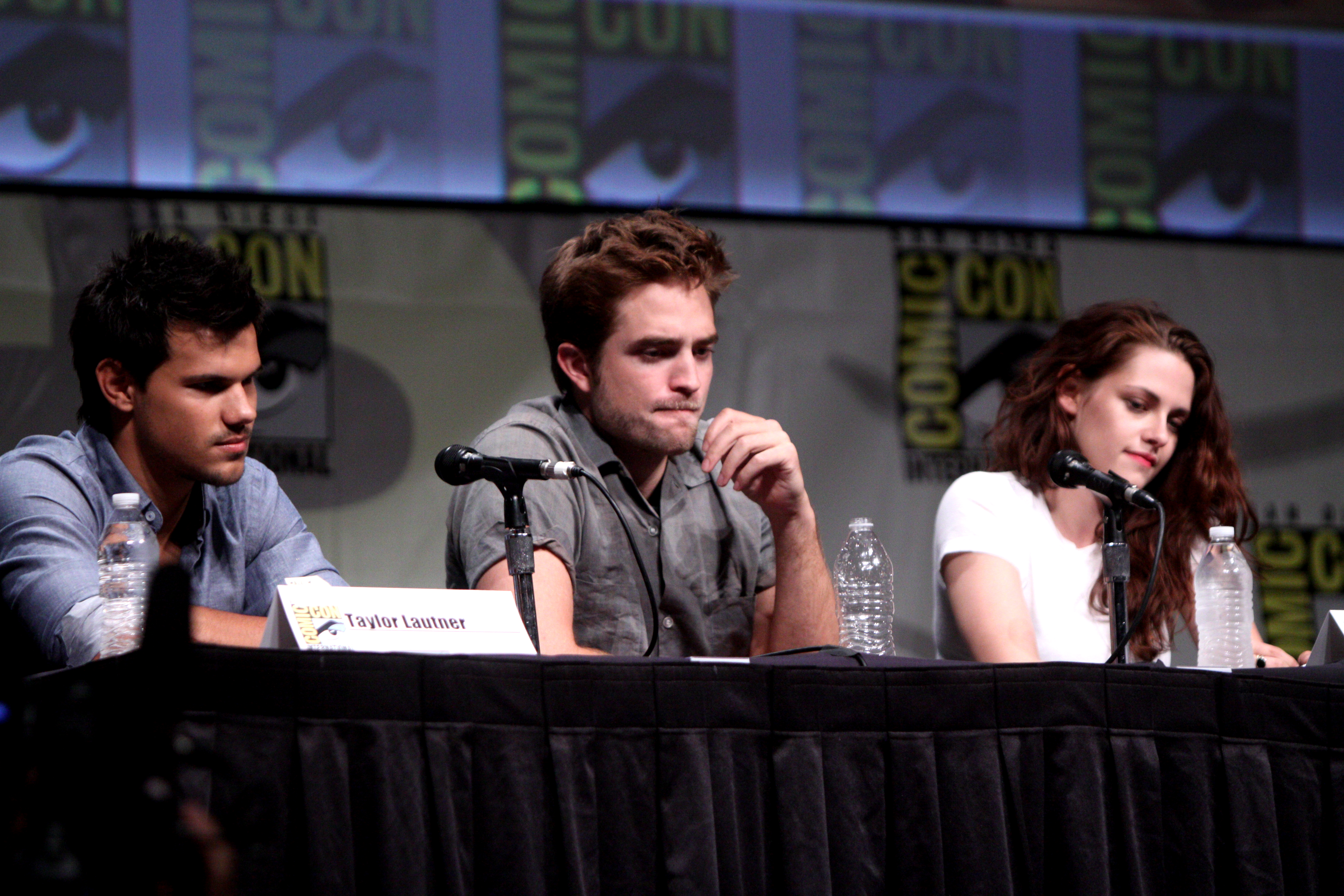
Stewart with Taylor Lautner (left) and Robert Pattinson (middle) at the 2012 San Diego Comic-Con

On November 16, 2007, Summit Entertainment announced that Stewart would play main character Bella Swan in the romantic fantasy film Twilight, based on Stephenie Meyer's novel of the same name. Stewart was on the set of Adventureland when director Catherine Hardwicke visited her for an informal screen test, which "captivated" the director. She starred alongside Robert Pattinson, who plays Edward Cullen, her vampire boyfriend. Stewart described her approach to the role as "capturing ... that first awakening, that ownership of your body and desire". Twilight was released in the U.S. in November 2008. Owen Gleiberman of Entertainment Weekly described her as "the ideal casting choice" and praised her for conveying "Bella's detachment, as well as her need to bust through it", while Claudia Puig of USA Today criticized her acting for being "wooden" and lacking variety in her "blank" facial expressions.

She received praise for her role in Adventureland (2009), a comedy-drama film written and directed by Greg Mottola, and co-starring Jesse Eisenberg. Critic James Berardinelli said, "Stewart is more than merely appealing in this role – she makes Em a fully realized woman, and some of the most intricate development results from what the camera observes in Stewart's eyes." Kenneth Turan of the Los Angeles Times said Stewart was "beautiful, enigmatic and very experienced". MSN Movies' James Rocchi stated, "Stewart's vulnerable, spooky power is used to nice effect." Stewart reprised the role of Bella in a sequel to Twilight, titled New Moon. Jordan Mintzer from Variety called Stewart "the heart and soul of the film" and praised her for giving "both weight and depth to dialogue...she makes Bella's psychological wounds seem like the real deal." On the other hand, Manohla Dargis from The New York Times said Stewart's "lonely-girl blues soon grow wearisome," and Bill Goodykoontz from The Arizona Republic stated "Stewart is a huge disappointment... She sucks the energy right out of the film". She reprised this role in a third film, Eclipse, which was released in June 2010. Critics were warmer toward the film compared to its predecessors.

=== Continued Twilight success and dramatic roles (2010s) ===
Stewart starred in The Yellow Handkerchief, which debuted at the 2009 Sundance Film Festival and was released in theaters in 2010. She also starred alongside James Gandolfini in Welcome to the Rileys, which premiered at the 2010 Sundance Film Festival. That same year, Stewart portrayed rock star Joan Jett in The Runaways, a biographical film of the titular band from writer-director Floria Sigismondi. Stewart met with Jett to prepare for the role and prerecorded songs in a studio for the film. Praising Stewart's performance, the Metro Times' Bill Holdship wrote, "It turns out that Stewart is actually really good at capturing Jett's icy, tough-but-cool girl swagger, adding the needed touches of vulnerability that transform it into a pretty terrific performance... Stewart is a genuine rock star here." Also, A. O. Scott of The New York Times noted a "watchful and unassuming" Stewart "gives the movie its spine and soul." At the 63rd British Academy Film Awards in February 2010, Stewart won the BAFTA Rising Star Award.

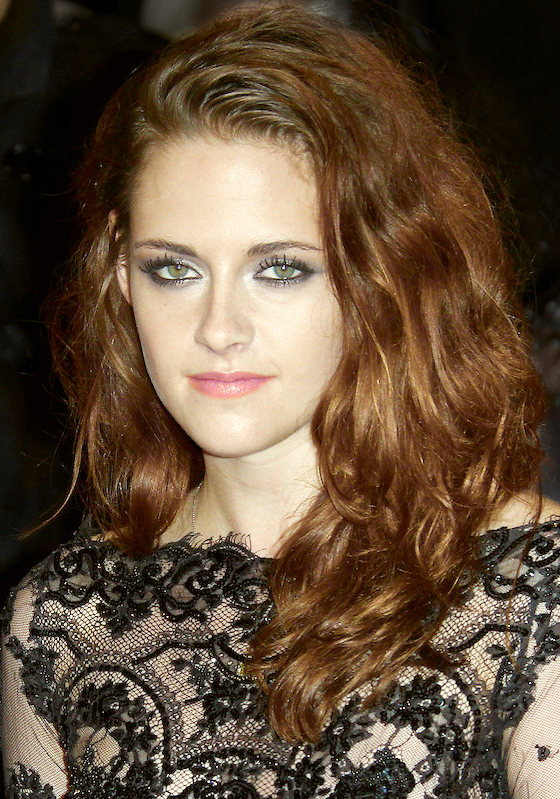
Stewart at the UK premiere of The Twilight Saga: Breaking Dawn – Part 2 in 2012

Stewart topped Forbes' list of "Hollywood's Best Actors for the Buck" in 2011. She was listed as the 13th highest-earning entertainment industry figure in Vanity Fair's "Hollywood's Top 40" list in the same year, with an estimated earning of $28.5 million for her film roles during the year. Forbes also ranked her as the world's highest-paid actress in 2012, with total earnings of $34.5 million.

The fourth installment in the Twilight film series, Breaking Dawn – Part 1, was released on November 18, 2011. The Village Voice's Dan Konis said Stewart "beautifully underplays" the role, while Emma Dibdin of Total Film described the relationship between Stewart and Pattinson's characters as "like a sad, destructive charade" despite the actors' chemistry.

On January 13, 2012, she became the face of a new unnamed Balenciaga perfume; in June, its name was promoted as "Florabotanica". Stewart starred as Snow White in the film Snow White and the Huntsman (2012). Stewart appeared as Mary Lou in On the Road, the film adaptation of Jack Kerouac's novel of the same name. She concluded the role of Bella Swan in Breaking Dawn – Part 2, released in November 2012. The film attracted a mixed critical response but found success during its box office run, grossing $830 million worldwide and becoming the 81st highest-grossing film. The Twilight film series, dubbed The Twilight Saga, generated $3.32 billion worldwide, making it one of the highest-grossing film franchises. According to Forbes, Stewart was the world's highest-paid actress in 2012, with total earnings of $34.5 million. She earned $12.5 million each for the last two installments in the Twilight series, including royalties.

On December 11, 2013, Chanel announced Stewart as their "new face" for a Western-inspired fashion collection. The campaign was shot by Karl Lagerfeld and released online in May 2014. In 2014, Balenciaga released a new fragrance, Rosabotanica, with Stewart remaining the face of the brand. She was ranked No. 3 on Forbes' highest-paid actress in 2013, with a total earning of $22 million, #10 in 2014 with $12 million, and #9 in 2015 with $12 million. Camp X-Ray, her first film of 2014, premiered at the 2014 Sundance Film Festival on January 17. While it generated mixed reviews from critics, Stewart's performance as a young soldier stationed at Guantanamo Bay detention camp received praise. David Rooney of The Hollywood Reporter called it "her best screen work to date [playing the role of] an inexperienced military guard", while Xan Brooks of The Guardian said, "It's a role that reminds us what a fine performer she was in the likes of Into the Wild and Adventureland.". In 2014, she appeared in the music video for Jenny Lewis' "Just One of the Guys", and in The New York Times short movie 9 Kisses.

Stewart next starred alongside Juliette Binoche and Chloë Grace Moretz in Olivier Assayas' Clouds of Sils Maria. The film premiered at the 2014 Cannes Film Festival. Her performance in the film was critically acclaimed. Todd McCarthy of The Hollywood Reporter said that "Stewart's habitual low-keyed style, which can border on the monotone, functions as effectively underplayed contrast." Peter Debruge of Variety praised Stewart's "spontaneous, agitated energy that makes her the most compellingly watchable American actress of her generation." Robbie Collin of The Daily Telegraph described her portrayal as "sharp and subtle, knowable and then suddenly distant" and highlighted the "brilliant lightness of touch" in her approach to the film's twist. For the performance, Stewart won the César Award for Best Supporting Actress, becoming the first American actress to receive a nomination in thirty years. She is the second American winner after Adrien Brody, who won the César Award for Best Actor in 2003. That same year, Stewart appeared alongside Julianne Moore in Still Alice, a drama film that premiered at the 2014 Toronto International Film Festival. Critics commended her performance in the film. Peter Travers of Rolling Stone called her "wonderfully vibrant and contentious" and said: "Even when Still Alice sometimes slips into sentiment, Moore and Stewart are funny, fierce and glorious.

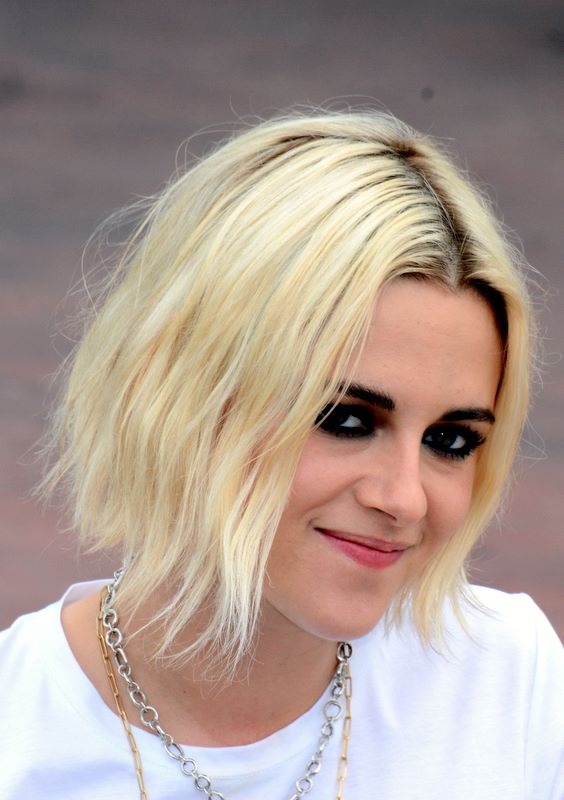
Stewart at the 2016 Cannes Film Festival

Stewart appeared in Tim Blake Nelson's Anesthesia, an indie drama about a group of New Yorkers, which was released on January 8, 2016, by IFC Films. She co-starred with Jesse Eisenberg again in American Ultra (2015). That same year, she starred in Once and Forever, which was directed by Karl Lagerfeld. Stewart co-starred along with Nicholas Hoult in Drake Doremus' futuristic love story Equals which was released on July 15, 2016. Stewart was confirmed to join Kelly Reichardt's film Certain Women in 2015; the film was released on October 14, 2016. She starred in the Woody Allen film Café Society, opposite Steve Carell and Jesse Eisenberg, marking her third collaboration with the latter. Gaining mixed reviews upon its premiere, the film was released in July 2016. Stewart also reunited with Clouds of Sils Maria director Olivier Assayas to headline his film Personal Shopper, a ghost story that takes place in the fashion industry. She also co-starred in Ang Lee's war drama Billy Lynn's Long Halftime Walk, which was released on November 11, 2016. In December 2016, Stewart appeared in the official music video for the Rolling Stones' single "Ride 'Em on Down". In 2016, Stewart became the youngest actress to be an honoree at the New York Film Festival. In the same year, Stewart was also an honoree at Elle's Women in Hollywood Awards alongside Amy Adams, Felicity Jones, Anna Kendrick, Aja Naomi King, Helen Mirren, and Lupita Nyong'o.

In May 2016, it was announced that Stewart would make her directorial debut with a short film for the female-focused digital publisher Refinery29. It would be part of their ShatterBox Anthology. The short film, titled Come Swim, had its world premiere at the 2017 Sundance Film Festival. In June, Stewart appeared in a video ad campaign for Chanel. In 2017, Stewart coauthored a computer science preprint about the use of neural net techniques in the making of her short film Come Swim. That same year, Stewart hosted Saturday Night Live for the first time with musical guest Alessia Cara and was invited to join the Academy of Motion Picture Arts and Sciences.

In 2018, Stewart appeared opposite Chloë Sevigny in Lizzie, about Lizzie Borden, directed by Craig William Macneill, which had its world premiere at the 2018 Sundance Film Festival. It was released on September 14, 2018, by Saban Films and Roadside Attractions. The film received mixed reviews from critics. She also starred in JT LeRoy, a biopic about Laura Albert, alongside Laura Dern and Diane Kruger. She also appeared in the music video for Interpol's "If You Really Love Nothing". She also served as a member of the jury for the official competition of the 2018 Cannes Film Festival.

=== Resurgence (2020s) ===
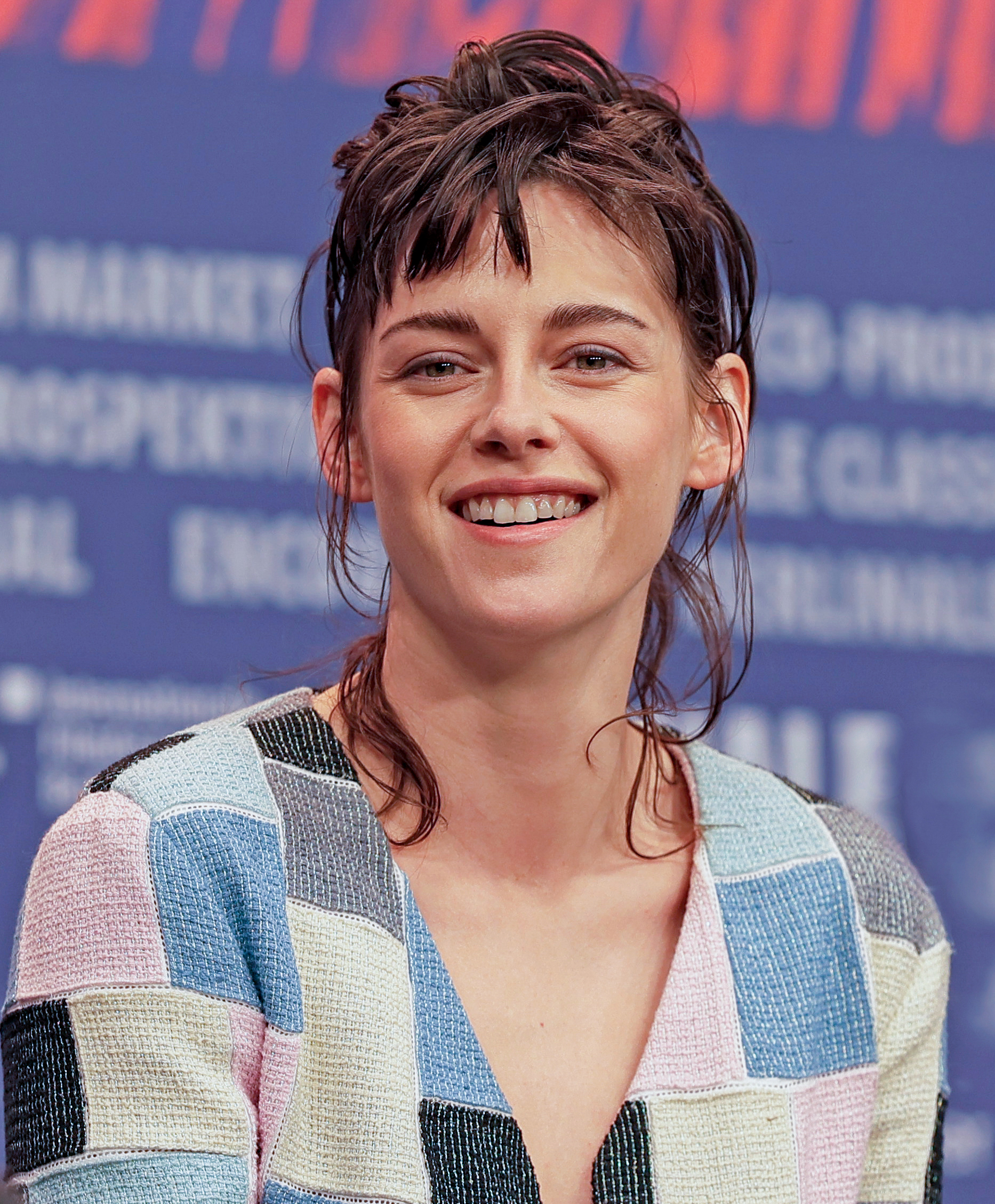
Stewart at the 2024 Berlin International Film Festival

"Performance is inherently vulnerable and therefore quite embarrassing and unmasculine. There’s no bravado in suggesting that you’re a mouthpiece for someone else's ideas. It's inherently submissive. Have you ever heard of a female actor that was method?"

— Stewart on the male vs. female approach to acting

Stewart starred as actress Jean Seberg in Seberg, directed by Benedict Andrews. It premiered at the 76th Venice International Film Festival in August 2019. While the film received mixed reviews, Stewart's performance received praise. Time magazine declared her performance the 10th best performance of 2019. Stewart returned to mainstream Hollywood with starring roles in the action comedy film Charlie's Angels (2019) and the science fiction film Underwater (2020). Critics were mixed in their reviews of both films, but Stewart's performance in the former was well received. Stewart wrote and directed a short film titled Crickets, as part of the anthology series Homemade which follows stories from 18 filmmakers from around the world during the COVID-19 pandemic isolation. It was co-produced by Pablo Larraín's production company, Fabula. The series was released on Netflix on June 30, 2020. Stewart later starred opposite Mackenzie Davis in Happiest Season, an LGBT holiday romance film directed by Clea DuVall, which was released on November 25, 2020.

In June 2020, Stewart was announced as having been cast as Diana, Princess of Wales in Pablo Larraín's biographical drama film Spencer, which chronicles Diana's decision to divorce Charles, Prince of Wales. She worked with a dialect coach and studied Diana's posture for the part. Describing Diana as someone who "sticks out as a sparkly house on fire", Stewart said she "felt more free and alive and able to move" in the role than she did in any of her previous projects. The film premiered at the 78th Venice International Film Festival in September 2021 and released in November that same year. Critics lauded Stewart's portrayal of Diana, with Jonathan Romney of Screen Daily describing it as "brittle, tender, sometimes playful and not a little uncanny" and Kyle Buchanan of The New York Times deeming her casting "a meta stroke of genius". Stewart received nominations for the Academy Award for Best Actress and Golden Globe Award for Best Actress in a Motion Picture – Drama for her performance.

Stewart played an investigator in the film Crimes of the Future. It premiered at the 2022 Cannes Film Festival. In his review, Todd McCarthy of Deadline Hollywood described Stewart's portrayal as "oddly nervous". In 2023, Stewart was selected as Jury President for the competition section of 73rd Berlin International Film Festival held in February. In 2024, Stewart starred in writer-director Rose Glass's romantic thriller Love Lies Bleeding. She also starred with Michael Angarano and Michael Cera in Angarano's road film Sacramento.

Filming began in February 2025 on The Wrong Girls in which she has a starring role, and also co-wrote and produced. She is set to star in the upcoming film, Flesh of the Gods.

In her directorial debut, Stewart wrote and directed The Chronology of Water, a film adaptation of writer Lidia Yuknavitch's memoir.

== Public image ==
Stewart ranked number 7 on AskMen's list of "Top 99 Women" for 2013. Glamour UK named her the best-dressed woman in 2012, 2013, and 2016. In 2020, Stewart received the Actress of the Decade Award by the Hollywood Critics Association.

== Personal life ==
Stewart resides in Los Angeles. In 2017, she stated that she was bisexual, saying, "You're not confused if you're bisexual. It's not confusing at all. For me, it's quite the opposite." Later, in 2026, during an appearance on the podcast In Your Dreams With Owen Thiele, she described herself as a lesbian. In 2019, Stewart stated that she had been advised not to be affectionate with her girlfriend in public, in order to land mainstream roles. She said: "I don't want to work with people like that." Stewart identifies as a feminist. She has equinophobia, the fear of horses.

Stewart dated Anton Yelchin when they were filming Fierce People; she described him as her "first heartbreak". After their relationship ended, Stewart dated her Speak co-star Michael Angarano from 2005 to early 2009.

Stewart and screenwriter Dylan Meyer, her then-fiancée, at the 27th Critics' Choice Awards

In mid-2009, Stewart became romantically linked to her Twilight co-star Robert Pattinson. In July 2012, Stewart was photographed with her Snow White and the Huntsman director Rupert Sanders, revealing an affair; the day the photos were released, Sanders, who was 19 years her senior and married at the time, issued a public apology for the affair, as did Stewart. The media backlash from the revelation caused a large emotional toll on Stewart. Stewart said the affair happened during a self-destructive moment in her life and called it "a really traumatic period in my early 20s that kick-started something in me that was a bit more feral." Pattinson and Stewart broke up, but late in October 2012 they reconciled, until May 2013 when they ended their relationship permanently.

In mid-2013, Stewart started dating visual effects producer Alicia Cargile. She briefly dated French singer Soko in the spring of 2016, before she resumed dating Cargile in mid-2016. Stewart briefly dated musician St. Vincent in late 2016. From late 2016, she was in a relationship with New Zealand model Stella Maxwell until their breakup in late 2018. Stewart has been in a relationship with screenwriter Dylan Meyer since August 2019, and stated in November 2021 that she and Meyer were engaged. The couple married in a private ceremony in Los Angeles on April 20, 2025.

== Charity work ==
In 2012, Stewart signed and donated the dress she wore to the premiere of The Twilight Saga: Breaking Dawn – Part 2 to a CharityBuzz auction benefiting the Robin Hood Foundation's Sandy Relief Fund, which provides long-term support to those affected by Hurricane Sandy. In 2016, she participated in building a school in Nicaragua through the nonprofit buildOn, with the goal being to give children the opportunity to become educated in a safe space and to break the cycle of poverty and illiteracy. The following year, she raised $500,000 for Hurricane Sandy relief by meeting with an unnamed "Middle Eastern prince" for 15 minutes.

In early 2026, Stewart said she purchased the Highland Theatre, a three-story movie and live theater located at 5604 N. Figueroa Street in the Highland Park neighborhood of Los Angeles, California, with plans to re-open it, following its closure in 2024.

== Filmography ==
=== Film ===
Year	Title	Role	Notes
2000	The Flintstones in Viva Rock Vegas	Ring Toss Girl	Uncredited
2001	The Safety of Objects	Sam Jennings	
2002	Panic Room	Sarah Altman	
2003	Cold Creek Manor	Kristen Tilson	
2004	Catch That Kid	Maddy Phillips	
2004	Undertow	Lila	
2004	Speak	Melinda Sordino	
2005	Fierce People	Maya	
2005	Zathura: A Space Adventure	Lisa Budwing	
2007	The Messengers	Jessica "Jess" Solomon	
2007	In the Land of Women	Lucy Hardwicke	
2007	The Cake Eaters	Georgia Kaminski	
2007	Into the Wild	Tracy Tatro	
2007	Cutlass	Young Robin	Short film
2008	Jumper	Sophie	
2008	What Just Happened	Zoe	
2008	The Yellow Handkerchief	Martine	
2008	Twilight	Bella Swan	
2009	Adventureland	Emily "Em" Lewin	
2009	The Twilight Saga: New Moon	Bella Swan	
2010	The Runaways	Joan Jett	
2010	The Twilight Saga: Eclipse	Bella Swan	
2010	Welcome to the Rileys	Allison/Mallory (alias)	
2011	The Twilight Saga: Breaking Dawn – Part 1	Bella Swan	
2012	Snow White and the Huntsman	Snow White	
2012	On the Road	Marylou	
2012	The Twilight Saga: Breaking Dawn – Part 2	Bella Swan	
2012	K-11	Ray's Secretary	Voice role
2014	Camp X-Ray	Cole	
2014	Clouds of Sils Maria	Valentine	
2014	Still Alice	Lydia Howland	
2014	9 Kisses		Short film
2015	American Ultra	Phoebe Larson	
2015	Anesthesia	Sophie	
2015	Once and Forever	Coco Chanel	Short film
2015	Equals	Nia	
2016	Certain Women	Elizabeth Travis	
2016	Café Society	Vonnie	
2016	Personal Shopper	Maureen	
2016	Billy Lynn's Long Halftime Walk	Kathryn	
2018	Lizzie	Bridget Sullivan	
2018	JT LeRoy	Savannah Knoop	
2019	Seberg	Jean Seberg	
2019	Love, Antosha	Herself	Documentary
2019	Charlie's Angels	Sabina Wilson	
2020	Underwater	Norah Price	
2020	Happiest Season	Abby Holland	
2021	Spencer	Diana, Princess of Wales	
2022	Crimes of the Future	Timlin	
2024	Love Me	Me / Deja	
2024	Love Lies Bleeding	Lou Langston	
2024	Sacramento	Rosie	
2026	Full Phil	Madeleine Doom	
2026	The Wrong Girls	Frankie	Also writer and producer
TBA	Flesh of the Gods	Alex	Post-production, Also producer

=== Television ===
Year	Title	Role	Notes
1999	The Thirteenth Year	Girl in Fountain Line	TV movie, uncredited
2008	The Sarah Silverman Program	Announcer	Episode: "I Thought My Dad Was Dead, But It Turns Out He's Not", uncredited
2017, 2019	Saturday Night Live	Herself (host)	2 episodes
2022	Irma Vep	Lianna	Episode: "The Terrible Wedding"
2023	Living for the Dead	Herself (narrator)	Also creator and executive producer

=== Music videos ===
Year	Title	Artist	Notes
2011	"I Was Broken"	Marcus Foster	
2014	"Just One of the Guys"	Jenny Lewis	
2016	"Ride 'Em On Down"	The Rolling Stones	
2018	"If You Really Love Nothing"	Interpol	
2023	"You Only Love Me"	Rita Ora	
2025	"Who Laughs Last?"	Lord Huron	Also featured vocalist

=== As director ===
Year	Title	Notes
2014	"Take Me To The South"	Music video by Sage + the Saints
2017	Come Swim	Short film, part of the anthology series ShatterBox Anthology
2017	"Down Side of Me"	Music video by Chvrches
2020	Crickets	Short film, part of the anthology series Homemade
2023	The Film	Short film/music video by Boygenius
2025	The Chronology of Water	Feature film, also writer and producer

== Awards and nominations ==
Stewart has received a César Award, Milano Film Festival Award, Young Artist Award, and the BAFTA Rising Star Award. She won a National Society of Film Critics, New York Film Critics Circle, and Boston Society of Film Critics Award for her performance in Clouds of Sils Maria. She has also been nominated for an Academy Award, Golden Globe Award, and Critics' Choice Movie Award for her performance in Spencer.
