= Come Swim =

2017 film

- Film poster
- Directed by: Kristen Stewart
- Written by: Kristen Stewart
- Produced by: David Ethan Shapiro
- Starring: Josh Kaye
- Cinematography: John Guleserian
- Edited by: Jacob Secher Schulsinger
- Music by: St. Vincent
- Distributed by: Refinery 29
- Release date: January 19, 2017 (Sundance)
- Running time: 17 minutes
- Country: United States
- Language: English

Come Swim is a 2017 American short film written and directed by Kristen Stewart. It was shown in the 70th Anniversary Events section at the 2017 Cannes Film Festival, and was part of the 2017 Sundance Film Festival. The short was produced by David E. Shapiro of Starlight Studios, who worked with Stewart for a period of approximately three years. The film was streamed from November 10, 2017.

== Cast ==
Josh Kaye is the only acting cast of the film. Sydney Lopez provides voice-over.

== Overview ==
Within a paper published on the subject of a technique developed especially for the creation of the film, the film is described as "a poetic, impressionistic portrait of a heartbroken man underwater ... the film is grounded in a painting of a man rousing from sleep". The Cannes Film Festival described the film as: "a diptych of one man's day; half Impressionist and half realist portraits". Little White Lies thought the film was about loss.

Cannes Suisse listed the film as Réalité Virtuelle. Next projection identified the film as experimental.

== Film concept ==
The idea of the film originated in ("is grounded in") a painting by Stewart of “a man rousing from sleep”. In a paper co-authored by Stewart, a description of reaction to the "impressionistic" painting states it “evokes the thoughts an individual has in the first moments of waking, (fading in-between dreams and reality)... ” A subsequent exploration correspondent to this painterly thematic element is explored within the film during the introductory and final scenes.

More-over, in accordance to the painting, the original concept for the film came from an image in the mind of Stewart of "...a person sleeping contently on the bottom of the ocean floor, and getting such satisfaction from that isolation..." For Stewart, her film is, amongst other things, about an experience of heartbreak (otherwise expressed by her as an "existential netherworld").

== Production ==
In order to create the piece, Stewart, together with film producer David Ethan Shapiro and Bhautik Joshi at Adobe Inc., innovated a technique described as neural style transfer, a technique detailed in a paper submitted on January 18, 2017 to arXiv.

Kristen Stewart partnered with Refinery29 in the production of the work. David Ethan Shapiro, the CEO of Starlight Studios, situated within Los Angeles, was producer.

The film uses a score composed by St. Vincent.

Stewart used John Guleserian for cinematography, and Framestore to produce the visual effects.

== Release and reception ==
The film was first screened at the 2017 Sundance Film Festival on January 19, 2017. Next projection identified the film as portraying in part something described as "nightmarish". Robbie Collin from The Telegraph awarded it four stars out of five saying: "It’s an earnest, sombre, often unsubtle work – but it’s also disciplined, sharply coherent, and cine-literate in an old-fashioned surrealist way." Matt Hoffman from Little White Lies found minor issues with the script, but nevertheless praised the short: "Come Swim is a beautiful looking piece of work. With the help of cinematographer John Guleserian, Stewart has crafted a rapturous visual wonder that far outshines the deficiencies of the screenplay."

== See also ==
- Conference on Computer Vision and Pattern Recognition
