= Personal Shopper =

2016 film by Olivier Assayas

- Theatrical release poster
- Directed by: Olivier Assayas
- Written by: Olivier Assayas
- Produced by: Charles Gillibert
- Starring: Kristen Stewart; Lars Eidinger; Sigrid Bouaziz; Anders Danielsen Lie; Ty Olwin; Hammou Graia; Nora von Waldstatten; Benjamin Biolay; Audrey Bonnet; Pascal Rambert
- Cinematography: Yorick Le Saux
- Edited by: Marion Monnier
- Music by: Sebastien Pan
- Production companies: CG Cinéma; Vortex Sutra; Detailfilm; Sirena Film; Arte France Cinéma; Arte Deutschland/WDR; Canal+; Ciné+
- Distributed by: The Searchers (Belgium); Artcam Films (Czech Republic); Les Films du Losange (France); Weltkino Filmverleih (Germany)
- Release dates: 17 May 2016 (Cannes); 14 December 2016 (Belgium and France); 19 January 2017 (Germany); 27 April 2017 (Czech Republic)
- Running time: 106 minutes
- Countries: France; Germany; Czech Republic; Belgium
- Languages: English; French; Swedish
- Budget: $6.4 million
- Box office: $3.8 million

Personal Shopper is a 2016 supernatural psychological thriller film written and directed by Olivier Assayas. The film stars Kristen Stewart as a young American woman in Paris who works as a personal shopper for a celebrity and tries to communicate with her deceased twin brother.

The film was an international co-production between Belgium, Czech Republic, France and Germany, Personal Shopper was selected to compete for the Palme d'Or at the 2016 Cannes Film Festival. At Cannes, Assayas shared the Best Director Award with Cristian Mungiu, who directed Graduation. The film was released on 14 December 2016 in France and 10 March 2017 in the United States. It received positive reviews from critics, with particular praise for Stewart's performance. It grossed $3.8 million worldwide.

== Plot ==
Maureen Cartwright is a personal shopper in Paris for Kyra Gellman, a supermodel. One night, Maureen video chats with her boyfriend, Gary, a contractor in Muscat, Oman, who encourages her to visit him, which she turns down. At Kyra's apartment, Maureen meets Ingo, a magazine editor and Kyra's lover. He tells Maureen that Kyra is planning to break up with him out of fear her husband will discover their relationship. Maureen talks about waiting for her twin brother, Lewis, who recently died of a genetic heart condition, to fulfill their pact to send a signal from the afterlife.

Lewis's girlfriend, Lara, meets Maureen at Lewis' house which they plan to sell. Maureen spends the night at the house and discovers the bathroom's faucets turning on. She then hears a loud bang and encounters a female spirit who vomits ectoplasm. She quickly gathers her things and leaves.

Maureen begins receiving text messages from an unknown sender who she initially suspects is Lewis. The messenger encourages her to indulge in forbidden desires, such as wearing Kyra's clothes. Maureen goes to Kyra's place to wear her clothes and masturbates in Kyra's bed. She falls asleep, is awoken by the same female spirit. The next morning, Maureen receives a hotel room key from the mystery texter. She visits Lara and tells her what she witnessed and that there is no longer a supernatural presence in the house.

Donning one of Kyra's newest dresses, Maureen goes to the room to find it empty. She attempts to investigate the identity of the mystery texter by inquiring at the front desk, but the room was paid for in cash.

Maureen drops off Kyra's jewelry at the apartment, cautiously opens Kyra's bedroom door, and finds blood all over the bed. She then goes into the bathroom where she finds Kyra's corpse on the floor. She flees on her motorcycle before returning to call the police. At the police station, she is interrogated about her relationship with Kyra but released. She ignores the texter who demands to know whether Maureen revealed their conversations to the police. Returning to her apartment, Maureen phones Gary to accept his offer to visit Muscat. She discovers Kyra's jewelry in her apartment, despite telling the police she left it at Kyra's place. The texter demands that Maureen return to the hotel room. She does, bringing the jewelry. At the hotel, Maureen seemingly recognizes a clandestine person entering the room. Elevators and doors in the hotel are then shown opening and closing for an invisible entity. Afterward, Ingo is shown leaving the hotel and being apprehended and beaten by two policemen.

Meeting Lara at a café, Maureen tells her that Ingo confessed to Kyra's murder. Lara offers for Maureen to stay with her before joining Gary in Oman. The next morning, Maureen meets Erwin, Lara's new boyfriend, who knew Lewis. He leaves for work, and as Maureen sits in the garden alone, a ghostly figure appears in the kitchen holding a glass. The figure disappears and the glass levitates briefly before shattering on the floor.

Maureen flies to Oman to stay with Gary in the mountains. At his retreat, she hears a noise and finds a glass floating in the air; it falls and shatters. She asks yes/no questions aloud, which are answered with one thump for "yes" and two for "no". Getting no response to "Lewis, is it you?", she asks, "Is it just me?", and hears a single thump.

== Cast ==
- Kristen Stewart as Maureen Cartwright
- Lars Eidinger as Ingo
- Nora Waldstätten as Kyra Gellman
- Anders Danielsen Lie as Erwin
- Sigrid Bouaziz as Lara
- Ty Olwin as Gary
- Audrey Bonnet as Cassandre
- Pascal Rambert as Jerome
- Hammou Graia as Police Officer
- Benjamin Biolay as Victor Hugo

== Production ==
In May 2015, it was announced that Olivier Assayas would be directing the film from a screenplay he wrote, with Kristen Stewart starring. He wrote it for Stewart after working with her in Clouds of Sils Maria. Charles Gillibert produced the film under his CG Cinema banner. In October 2015, Sigrid Bouaziz, Lars Eidinger, Anders Danielsen Lie, and Nora von Waldstätten were cast in the film. In November 2015, Ty Olwin was cast.

Principal photography began on 27 October 2015 in Paris for two weeks and then moved to Prague, London, and Oman.

== Release ==
Personal Shopper had its world premiere at the Cannes Film Festival on 17 May 2016, where it competed for the Palme d'Or. The film was distributed by Les Films du Losange in France, and IFC Films in North America. Universal Pictures distributed the film in Scandinavia, Latin America, Eastern Europe, Poland, Turkey, Portugal, the Baltics, the CIS excluding Russia, India, Indonesia and Taiwan. The film was screened at the 2016 Toronto International Film Festival and the New York Film Festival. It was released in France on 14 December 2016 and in the United States on 10 March 2017.

According to The Numbers, in the United States Personal Shopper grossed $79,175 in four theaters for an average of $19,794, the highest of the weekend. After adding 31 theaters the next weekend, it grossed $152,478. Its final US domestic total was $1.3 million, its international gross was $2.5 million, for a worldwide gross of $3.8 million.

== Critical reception ==
Personal Shopper received positive reviews from film critics. Review aggregator Rotten Tomatoes reports a score of 81% based on 273 reviews. The site's critical consensus reads, "Personal Shopper attempts a tricky series of potentially jarring tonal shifts with varying results, bolstered by a performance from Kristen Stewart that's impossible to ignore." On Metacritic, the film holds a rating of 77 out of 100, based on 38 critics. The film was booed at its initial screening at the Cannes Film Festival, about which Assayas said, "It happens every once and a while [sic] where people just don't get the ending." At its official premiere at Cannes, the film received a 4½-minute standing ovation.

The Guardian awarded the film five out of five, calling it "uncategorisable yet undeniably terrifying". Stephanie Zacharek of Time gave a positive review, writing, "Personal Shopper is a strange and beautifully made film, and both star and director are clearly energized by their dual mission." She listed it as one of Time's top ten films of 2017. A. O. Scott of The New York Times called the film "sleek and spooky, seductive and suspenseful. It flirts with silliness, as ghost stories do. And also with heartbreak."

== Accolades ==
Year	Organization	Category	Recipient(s) and nominee(s)	Outcome
2016	Cannes Film Festival	Best Director	Olivier Assayas	Won
2016	Oaxaca FilmFest	Best Actress	Kristen Stewart	Won
2016	Online Film Critics Society	Best Non-U.S. Release	Personal Shopper	Won
2017	Austin Film Critics Association	Best Actress	Kristen Stewart	Nominated
2017	Dublin Film Critics' Circle	Best Actress	Kristen Stewart	Nominated
2017	Florida Film Critics Circle	Best Cinematography	Yorick Le Saux	Nominated
2017	Indiana Film Journalists Association	Best Actress	Kristen Stewart	Nominated
2017	Indiewire Annual Critics Poll	Best Film	Personal Shopper	8th place
2017	Indiewire Annual Critics Poll	Best Actress	Kristen Stewart	5th place
2017	International Cinephile Society	Best Picture Not Released in 2016	Personal Shopper	Nominated
2017	International Film Festival Rotterdam	Best Director	Olivier Assayas	Nominated
2017	Las Vegas Film Critics Society	Best Actress	Kristen Stewart	Nominated
2017	St. Louis Film Critics Association	Best Actress	Kristen Stewart	Nominated
2018	International Cinephile Society	Best Picture	Personal Shopper	3rd place
2018	International Cinephile Society	Best Actress	Kristen Stewart	Nominated
2018	International Cinephile Society	Best Original Screenplay	Olivier Assayas	Nominated
2018	International Cinephile Society	Best Film Editing	Marion Monnier	Nominated
2018	Talk Film Society	Best Actress	Kristen Stewart	Nominated
2018	Village Voice Annual Film Poll	Best Film	Personal Shopper	7th place
2018	Village Voice Annual Film Poll	Best Actress	Kristen Stewart	5th place
2018	Fright Meter Awards	Best Actress	Kristen Stewart	Nominated
2018	Fright Meter Awards	Best Costume Design	Jürgen Doering	Nominated
2018	Fright Meter Awards	Best Screenplay	Olivier Assayas	Nominated
2018	Sant Jordi Awards	Best Foreign Film	Personal Shopper	Nominated
2018	Sant Jordi Awards	Best Actress in a Foreign Film	Kristen Stewart	Nominated
