= Spencer (film) =

2021 film by Pablo Larraín

- Theatrical release poster
- Directed by: Pablo Larraín
- Written by: Steven Knight
- Produced by: Juan de Dios Larraín; Jonas Dornbach; Paul Webster; Pablo Larraín; Janine Jackowski; Maren Ade
- Starring: Kristen Stewart; Timothy Spall; Jack Farthing; Sean Harris; Sally Hawkins
- Cinematography: Claire Mathon
- Edited by: Sebastián Sepúlveda
- Music by: Jonny Greenwood
- Production companies: Komplizen Film; Fábula; Shoebox Films; FilmNation Entertainment
- Distributed by: Neon and Topic Studios (United States); STXinternational (United Kingdom); DCM Film Distribution (Germany); Sun Distribution (Chile)
- Release dates: 3 September 2021 (Venice); 5 November 2021 (United Kingdom and United States)
- Running time: 117 minutes
- Countries: United Kingdom; United States; Germany; Chile
- Language: English
- Budget: $18 million
- Box office: $25.2 million

Spencer is a 2021 historical psychological drama film directed by Pablo Larraín and written by Steven Knight. The film is about Diana, Princess of Wales's existential crisis during the Christmas of 1991, as she considers divorcing Prince Charles and leaving the British royal family. Kristen Stewart and Jack Farthing star as Diana and Charles, respectively, alongside Jack Neilen and Freddie Spry as Prince William and Prince Harry, respectively. Also starring Timothy Spall, Sean Harris, and Sally Hawkins. It is the second film in Larraín's trilogy of iconic 20th century women, succeeding Jackie (2016) and preceding Maria (2024).

Spencer premiered at the 78th Venice International Film Festival on 3 September 2021, and was theatrically released in the United Kingdom and the United States on 5 November 2021. The film grossed $25.2 million worldwide on an $18 million budget. It received generally positive reviews from critics, with Stewart's performance garnering widespread praise. For her performance as Diana, Stewart received numerous awards, including nominations for the Academy Award for Best Actress, Critics' Choice Movie Award for Best Actress, and Golden Globe Award for Best Actress in a Motion Picture – Drama.

== Plot ==
On Christmas Eve 1991, the British royal family prepares to spend Christmas at Sandringham House in Norfolk. Among the attendees is Diana, Princess of Wales, whose marriage to Charles, Prince of Wales has become strained due to his affair with [[Camilla Parker Bowles. The staff of Sandringham prepare for the royals' arrivals. Instead of driving with her security detail, Diana has decided to drive herself and has become lost, until she runs into Royal Head Chef Darren McGrady. She notes that the long-abandoned neighbouring estate, Park House, was her childhood home. She then notices a scarecrow in the distance and eagerly runs towards it. Diana takes off its jacket, which once belonged to her father John Spencer, 8th Earl Spencer, and goes back to her car.

When Diana arrives at Sandringham, her sons William and Harry are excited to see her, but she does not attempt to socialise with the rest of the royal family. Diana's only friend at Sandringham is royal dresser Maggie, who encourages her to both combat the royal family and fulfil the obligations expected of her. Diana finds a book on Anne Boleyn in her bedroom. She begins to have dreams about Boleyn (including a hallucination of her at a Christmas Eve dinner where she imagines herself destroying a pearl necklace given to her by Charles and eating the pearls in her soup), eventually coming to believe that Boleyn's ghost is haunting her as a fellow abandoned royal wife. Diana tries to visit her childhood home, but is stopped by royal guards who initially mistake her for an intruder.

On Christmas Day, Diana attends a service at St Mary Magdalene Church, Sandringham, where she notices Camilla among the gathered crowd and is photographed by numerous intrusive journalists. She holds a difficult conversation with Charles, who rebuffs her concerns over William and Harry's participation in a pheasant shoot the next day, and advises her to develop a stronger sense of separation between her public and private lives. Charles privately arranges for Maggie to be sent to London and spreads rumours that she had planted the Boleyn book in Diana's room and made critical comments about her mental health; McGrady denies that she had done so when Diana questions him.

Major Gregory attempts to encourage Diana to conform to the pressures of royal life by reminding her that the soldiers of the British Army die trying to protect the interests of the Crown (and by extension her interests). Diana responds by stating that she never asked anyone to die for her and accuses him of planting the Boleyn book in her room as a warning, which he denies.

After imagining wounding herself with a pair of wire cutters given to her by McGrady, Diana avoids the formal Christmas Day dinner, and instead runs to her childhood home and gains access with the wire cutters. Memories of her happier childhood overtake her, and she dances from room to room while imagining her younger self. She considers taking her own life by throwing herself down a flight of stairs, but the hallucinations of Boleyn stop her. Instead, she rips apart her pearl necklace.

On Boxing Day, Diana wakes up in her room to find that Maggie has been called back from London. The two travel to a nearby beach, where Diana talks about her mental and marital problems. Maggie responds by confessing that she is in love with Diana. After bidding Maggie farewell, Diana goes to the pheasant shoot, walks out in front of the crowd of hunters, and announces that she is taking William and Harry to London, to which Charles reluctantly agrees. Diana bids farewell to McGrady and Major Gregory returns the Boleyn book to the library. As they drive away, Diana and her children sing along to the song "All I Need Is a Miracle" by Mike and the Mechanics, passing the scarecrow which is now dressed in one of Diana's outfits. They drive to London, where they order KFC and eat by the River Thames. Diana looks across the river, uncertain of her future but no longer feeling burdened by royal responsibility.

== Cast ==
- Kristen Stewart as Diana, Princess of Wales (née Spencer)
  - Greta Bücker as late-teens Diana
  - Kimia Schmidt as nine-year-old Diana
- Timothy Spall as Equerry Major Alistair Gregory
- Jack Nielen as Prince William of Wales
- Freddie Spry as Prince Henry "Harry" of Wales
- Jack Farthing as Charles, Prince of Wales
- Sean Harris as Royal Head Chef Darren McGrady
- Sally Hawkins as Royal Dresser Maggie
- Stella Gonet as Elizabeth II
- Richard Sammel as Prince Philip, Duke of Edinburgh
- Elizabeth Berrington as Anne, Princess Royal
- Amy Manson as Anne Boleyn
- James Harkness as Footman Paul
- John Keogh as Michael
- Ben Plunkett-Reynolds as Footman Brian
- Ryan Wichert as Staff Sergeant Wood
- Thomas Douglas as John Spencer, 8th Earl Spencer
- Emma Darwall-Smith as Camilla Parker Bowles
- Niklas Kohrt as Prince Andrew, Duke of York
- Olga Hellsing as Sarah, Duchess of York
- Mathias Wolkowski as Prince Edward
- Oriana Gordon as Lady Sarah Armstrong-Jones
- Laura Benson as Angela

== Production ==
=== Development ===
On 17 June 2020, it was announced that Pablo Larraín would direct Spencer, a film starring Kristen Stewart as Diana, Princess of Wales. On 26 June 2020, it was reported that Neon and Topic Studios had acquired the rights to distribute the film in the United States for $4 million in a bidding war that reportedly also included Searchlight Pictures, Universal Pictures and A24. In July 2020, STX Entertainment acquired rights to the film in the United Kingdom, France, Italy and the Benelux, while DCM Film Distribution was set to distribute the film in Germany and Switzerland.

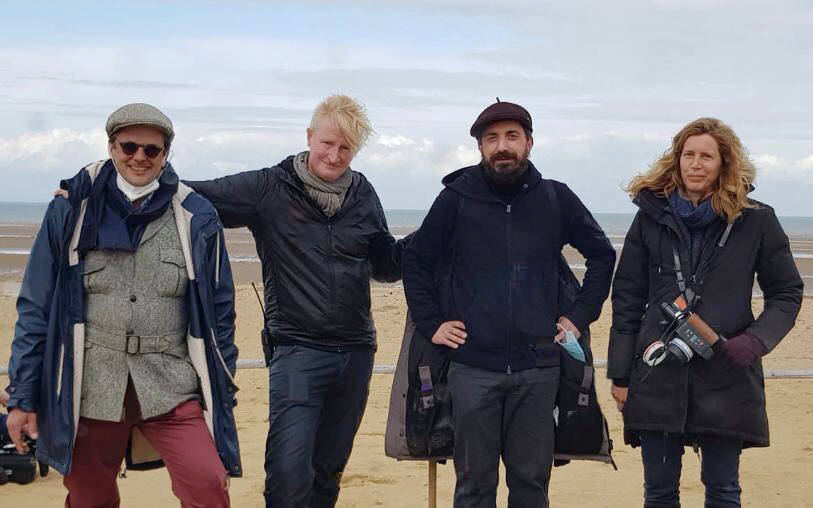
First AD Gregor Stitzl, Production Designer Guy Hendrix Dyas, Director Pablo Larraín and Cinematographer Claire Mathon on location at Hunstanton beach, Norfolk, U.K.

=== Filming ===
Filming began at the Schlosshotel Kronberg, Germany, in January 2021 with Timothy Spall, Sally Hawkins, and Sean Harris joining the cast. Other filming locations were the Schloss Marquardt in Marquardt, north of the city of Potsdam, and Nordkirchen Castle, the moated castle. During the fall of 2020, Larraín and Production Designer Guy Hendrix Dyas embarked on an intense scout in search of the perfect location. Sandringham House is a British institution set within the picturesque landscape of Norfolk. The fore mentioned Nordkirchen Castle was exactly what the script called for, grand and impressive, yet isolated. "An Elegant prison" was the exact expression coined by Larraín and Dyas to convey the overall sentiment to the rest of the crew. Somewhere where you wouldn't necessarily enjoy spending Christmas, where you get the subtle feeling that underneath the festivities there's a real anguish and misery at play. On 25 March, production moved to the UK for the final stretch of filming, with Jack Farthing joining the cast as Prince Charles, and the film wrapped on 27 April 2021.

The film was shot on both Kodak Super 16mm and 35mm film stock by cinematographer Claire Mathon using the Arricam LT, and Arriflex 416 Plus. To achieve the film's specific look, she used a combination of Leitz Summilux and Zeiss Ultra 16 lenses.

In an interview with Kodak, Mathon said that shooting on film was their obvious choice, calling it a "necessity" and that "there was never a question about shooting digital or film". According to her, the only question was whether they would shoot the film in 16mm or 35mm film stock. She also revealed that she and Larraín reviewed sequences from various Stanley Kubrick films such as Barry Lyndon (1975) and A Clockwork Orange (1971) to learn about the style of camera movement, rhythm of the shots, and the use of short focal lenses.

Most of the film was shot on Super 16mm film format due to the lightness, and ergonomics of the equipment used while also revealing that economic advantages is also part of the reason. In some scenes where they wanted to minimize the grain, they opted for the 35mm film stock as it retains both softness and details on the darker part of the image.

Film processing and 4K 16-bit scans were done at Hiventy in Paris, while the cameras were supported by Arri Rental in Berlin, Germany.

=== Music ===
Jonny Greenwood composed the score. The score was released by Mercury KX on 12 November 2021. Writing for the You Discover Music website, Sharon Kelly described the soundtrack, stating: "Jonny Greenwood's genre bending music for the Spencer soundtrack combines free jazz and classical baroque."

== Release ==
Spencer had its world premiere in competition at the Venice International Film Festival. It then screened at film festivals in Telluride, Toronto, London, Philadelphia, San Diego and Zurich.

The film was theatrically released in the United Kingdom and the United States on 5 November 2021. It was the last film to be distributed by STX Entertainment in the United Kingdom before the distributor's UK division was shut down on 28 July 2022.

== Reception ==
=== Box office ===
Spencer grossed more than $7 million in the United States and Canada, and $18.1 million in other territories, for a worldwide total of $25.2 million.

In the United States and Canada, Spencer made $2.1 million from 996 theatres in its opening weekend. In its second weekend, the film played in 1,265 theatres and made $1.53 million.

=== Critical response ===
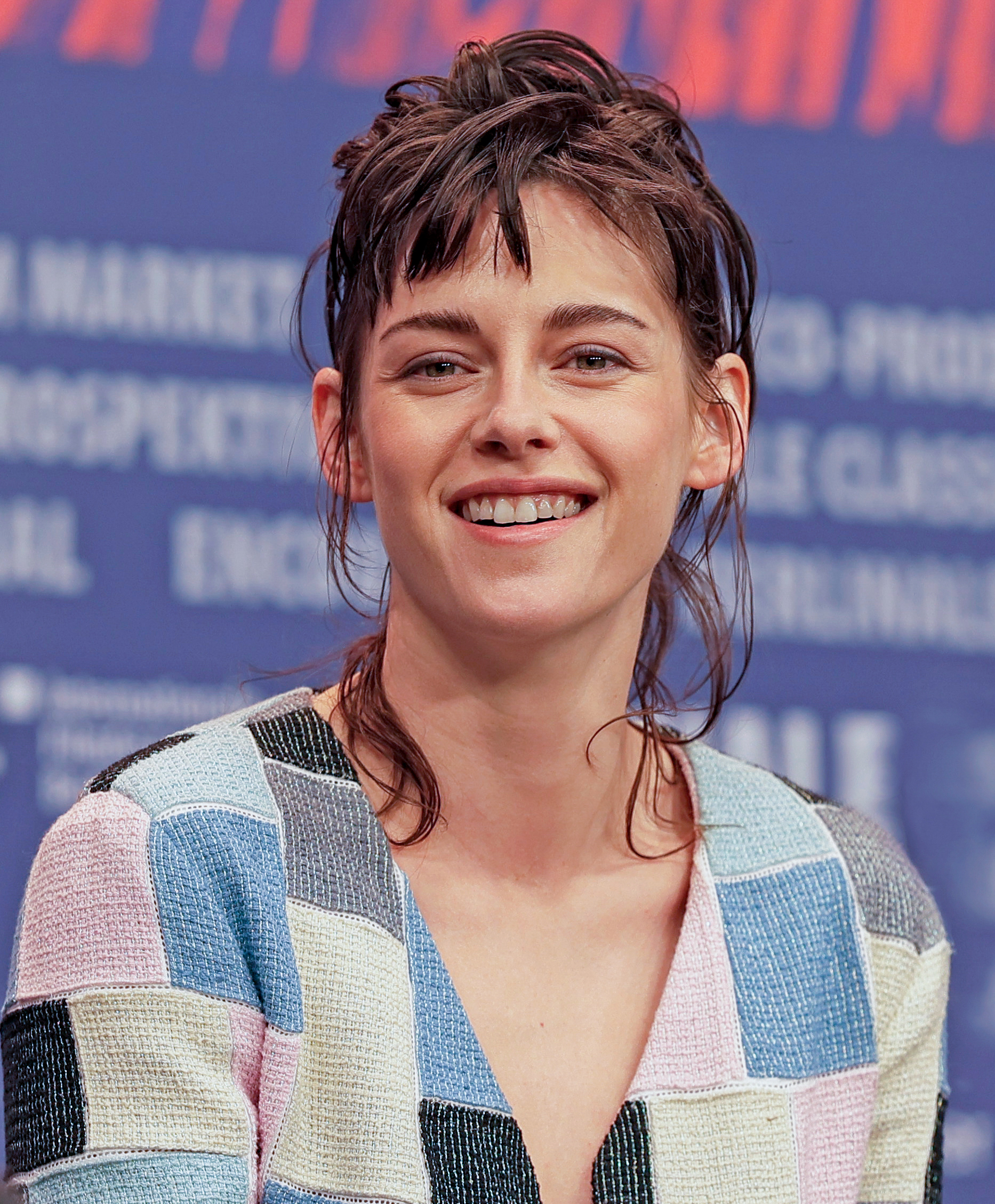
Kristen Stewart received critical acclaim for her performance and received an Academy Award nomination for Best Actress.

Upon the teaser trailer's release, Forbes reported that the role "thrusts" Stewart "into the Oscar race" for the Academy Award for Best Actress. After the film's world premiere, Variety also stated, "There's already been plenty of talk in Venice that the role will likely land Stewart her first Oscar nomination." The film received a three-minute standing ovation at its world premiere, with critics lauding Stewart's performance as Diana.

On review aggregator Rotten Tomatoes, 83% of 351 critics have given the film a positive review, with an average rating of 7.6/10. The website's critics consensus reads: "Spencer can frustrate with its idiosyncratic depiction of its subject's life, but Kristen Stewart's finely modulated performance anchors the film's flights of fancy." On Metacritic, the film has a weighted average score of 76 out of 100, based on 53 critics, indicating "generally favorable reviews".

David Rooney of The Hollywood Reporter stated that the film "rests on Stewart's shoulders and she commits to the film's slightly bonkers excesses as much as to its moments of delicate illumination" and wrote that "[not] everything lands in Spencer, and I often wondered if the film was so set on bucking convention that it would alienate its audience. But it tells a sorrowful story we all think we know in a new and genuinely disturbing light." Reviewing the film for The Daily Telegraph, Robbie Collin wrote: "The 31-year-old Stewart – who will be instantly and justifiably awards-tipped for this – navigates this perilous terrain with total mastery, getting the voice and mannerisms just right but vamping everything up just a notch, in order to better lean into the film's melodramatic, paranoiac and absurdist swerves." Drawing comparisons between the film and the Jacqueline Kennedy biopic Jackie (2016), also directed by Larraín, Pete Hammond of Deadline Hollywood stated that "Spencer is something else indeed, almost playing out in a conventional dramatic fashion, a more accessible approach in some ways, but also more ambitious as it is squarely from the point of view of its title character, purposely called Spencer to assure us that the person who once was, is well on the way to finding that very lost spirit again before it is too late."

Spencer was listed on many critics' top ten lists for 2021.

=== Response of the Princess' staff ===
Stewart's portrayal of Diana was hailed as one of the most accurate portrayals of the late Princess. Ken Wharfe, Diana's former bodyguard, commented, "Out of all the people who have played Diana over the past 10 years, she's the closest to her. She managed to perfect her mannerisms." Former Royal Chef Darren McGrady, who was portrayed by actor Sean Harris in the film, said, "Kristen Stewart is amazing as the princess, with her mannerisms and her voice ... the happy scenes of her with the boys, it was like her coming alive again. For real, Kristen Stewart played an amazing part." However, McGrady also pointed out that the film took considerable liberties, especially with its use of metaphors, but acknowledged that the film was a fictionalised take on what possibly could have happened.

== Accolades ==
Award	Date of ceremony	Category	Recipient(s)	Result	Ref(s)
AACTA International Awards	26 January 2022	Best Actress	Kristen Stewart	Nominated	
AACTA International Awards	26 January 2022	Best Supporting Actress	Sally Hawkins	Nominated	
Academy Awards	27 March 2022	Best Actress	Kristen Stewart	Nominated	
Alliance of Women Film Journalists Awards	25 January 2022	Best Actress	Kristen Stewart	Nominated	
Austin Film Critics Association	11 January 2022	Best Actress	Kristen Stewart	Nominated	
Austin Film Critics Association	11 January 2022	Best Original Score	Jonny Greenwood	Nominated	
Boston Society of Film Critics Awards	12 December 2021	Best Original Score	Jonny Greenwood	Won	
Chicago Film Critics Association Awards	15 December 2021	Best Actress	Kristen Stewart	Won	
Chicago Film Critics Association Awards	15 December 2021	Best Original Score	Jonny Greenwood	Nominated	
Chicago Film Critics Association Awards	15 December 2021	Best Costume Design	Jacqueline Durran	Won	
Critics' Choice Movie Awards	13 March 2022	Best Actress	Kristen Stewart	Nominated	
Critics' Choice Movie Awards	13 March 2022	Best Score	Jonny Greenwood	Nominated	
Dallas–Fort Worth Film Critics Association	20 December 2021	Best Actress	Kristen Stewart	Won	
Denver Film Critics Society	17 January 2022	Best Actress	Kristen Stewart	Won	
Denver Film Critics Society	17 January 2022	Best Score	Jonny Greenwood	Nominated	
Detroit Film Critics Society	6 December 2021	Best Actress	Kristen Stewart	Nominated	
Dorian Awards	17 March 2022	Best Lead Film Performance	Kristen Stewart	Won	
Dorian Awards	17 March 2022	Best Film Music	Jonny Greenwood	Nominated	
Dublin Film Critics' Circle	21 December 2021	Best Actress	Kristen Stewart	Runner-up	
Dublin Film Critics' Circle	21 December 2021	Best Cinematography	Claire Mathon	4th place	
Florida Film Critics Circle	22 December 2021	Best Actress	Kristen Stewart	Nominated	
Florida Film Critics Circle	22 December 2021	Best Cinematography	Claire Mathon	Runner-up	
Georgia Film Critics Association	14 January 2022	Best Actress	Kristen Stewart	Nominated	
Georgia Film Critics Association	14 January 2022	Best Original Score	Jonny Greenwood	Nominated	
Gold Derby Film Awards	16 March 2022	Best Actress	Kristen Stewart	Won	
Gold Derby Film Awards	16 March 2022	Best Cinematography	Claire Mathon	Nominated	
Gold Derby Film Awards	16 March 2022	Best Costume Design	Jacqueline Durran	Nominated	
Gold Derby Film Awards	16 March 2022	Best Make Up and hair	Wakana Yoshihara, Sian Wilson, Stacey Panepinto, Nicola Isles	Nominated	
Gold Derby Film Awards	16 March 2022	Best Original Score	Jonny Greenwood	Nominated	
Golden Globe Awards	9 January 2022	Best Actress in a Motion Picture – Drama	Kristen Stewart	Nominated	
Greater Western New York Film Critics Association	1 January 2022	Best Picture	Spencer	Nominated	
Greater Western New York Film Critics Association	1 January 2022	Best Director	Pablo Larraín	Nominated	
Greater Western New York Film Critics Association	1 January 2022	Best Lead Actress	Kristen Stewart	Won	
Greater Western New York Film Critics Association	1 January 2022	Best Cinematography	Claire Mathon	Nominated	
Greater Western New York Film Critics Association	1 January 2022	Best Editing	Sebastián Sepúlveda	Nominated	
Greater Western New York Film Critics Association	1 January 2022	Best Score	Jonny Greenwood	Won	
Hamilton Behind the Camera Awards	13 November 2021	Director Award	Pablo Larrain	Won	
Hollywood Critics Association	28 February 2022	Best Picture	Spencer	Nominated	
Hollywood Critics Association	28 February 2022	Best Director	Pablo Larraín	Nominated	
Hollywood Critics Association	28 February 2022	Best Actress	Kristen Stewart	Won	
Hollywood Critics Association	28 February 2022	Best Costume Design	Jacqueline Durran	Nominated	
Hollywood Critics Association	28 February 2022	Best Original Score	Jonny Greenwood	Nominated	
Hollywood Critics Association	28 February 2022	Best Cinematography	Claire Mathon	Nominated	
Hollywood Critics Association	28 February 2022	Best Production Design	Guy Hendrix Dyas and Yesim Zolan	Nominated	
Hollywood Critics Association	28 February 2022	Best Indie Film	Spencer	Nominated	
Houston Film Critics Society Awards	19 January 2022	Best Actress	Kristen Stewart	Nominated	
Houston Film Critics Society Awards	19 January 2022	Best Original Score	Jonny Greenwood	Nominated	
International Cinephile Society	6 February 2022	Best Picture	Spencer	18th place	
International Cinephile Society	6 February 2022	Best Actress	Kristen Stewart	Nominated	
International Cinephile Society	6 February 2022	Best Cinematography	Claire Mathon	Nominated	
International Cinephile Society	6 February 2022	Best Score	Jonny Greenwood	Nominated	
London Film Critics Circle	6 February 2022	Actress of the Year	Kristen Stewart	Nominated	
Los Angeles Film Critics Association Awards	18 December 2021	Best Music	Jonny Greenwood	Runner-up	
National Film Awards UK	4 July 2022	Best Newcomer (for Spencer)	Freddie Spry	Nominated	
Online Film Critics Society Awards	24 January 2022	Best Actress	Kristen Stewart	Nominated	
Online Film Critics Society Awards	24 January 2022	Best Original Score	Jonny Greenwood	Nominated	
Online Film Critics Society Awards	24 January 2022	Best Costume Design	Spencer	Nominated	
Palm Springs International Film Festival	6 January 2022	Spotlight Award - Actress	Kristen Stewart	Won	
San Diego Film Critics Society	10 January 2021	Best Actress	Kristen Stewart	Nominated	
San Francisco Bay Area Film Critics Circle	10 January 2022	Best Actress	Kristen Stewart	Nominated	
San Francisco Bay Area Film Critics Circle	10 January 2022	Best Original Score	Jonny Greenwood	Nominated	
Satellite Awards	2 April 2022	Best Motion Picture – Drama	Spencer	Nominated	
Satellite Awards	2 April 2022	Best Actress in a Motion Picture – Drama	Kristen Stewart	Won	
Satellite Awards	2 April 2022	Best Art Direction and Production Design	Guy Hendrix Dyas and Yesim Zolan	Nominated	
Satellite Awards	2 April 2022	Best Costume Design	Jacqueline Durran	Nominated	
Satellite Awards	2 April 2022	Best Original Score	Jonny Greenwood	Nominated	
Seattle Film Critics Society	17 January 2022	Best Actress in a Leading Role	Kristen Stewart	Won	
Seattle Film Critics Society	17 January 2022	Best Costume Design	Jacqueline Durran	Nominated	
Seattle Film Critics Society	17 January 2022	Best Original Score	Jonny Greenwood	Nominated	
Southeastern Film Critics Association	13 December 2021	Best Actress	Kristen Stewart	Won	
St. Louis Gateway Film Critics Association Awards	19 December 2021	Best Actress	Kristen Stewart	Won	
St. Louis Gateway Film Critics Association Awards	19 December 2021	Best Music Score	Jonny Greenwood	Nominated	
St. Louis Gateway Film Critics Association Awards	19 December 2021	Best Costume Design	Jacqueline Durran	Runner-up	
Toronto Film Critics Association	16 January 2022	Best Actress	Kristen Stewart	Runner-up	
Venice International Film Festival	11 September 2021	Golden Lion	Pablo Larraín	Nominated	
Washington D.C. Area Film Critics Association	6 December 2021	Best Actress	Kristen Stewart	Won	
Washington D.C. Area Film Critics Association	6 December 2021	Best Score	Jonny Greenwood	Nominated	
Women Film Critics Circle	13 December 2021	Best Actress	Kristen Stewart	Won	
