= Billy Bragg discography =

Cataloguing of published recordings by Billy Bragg

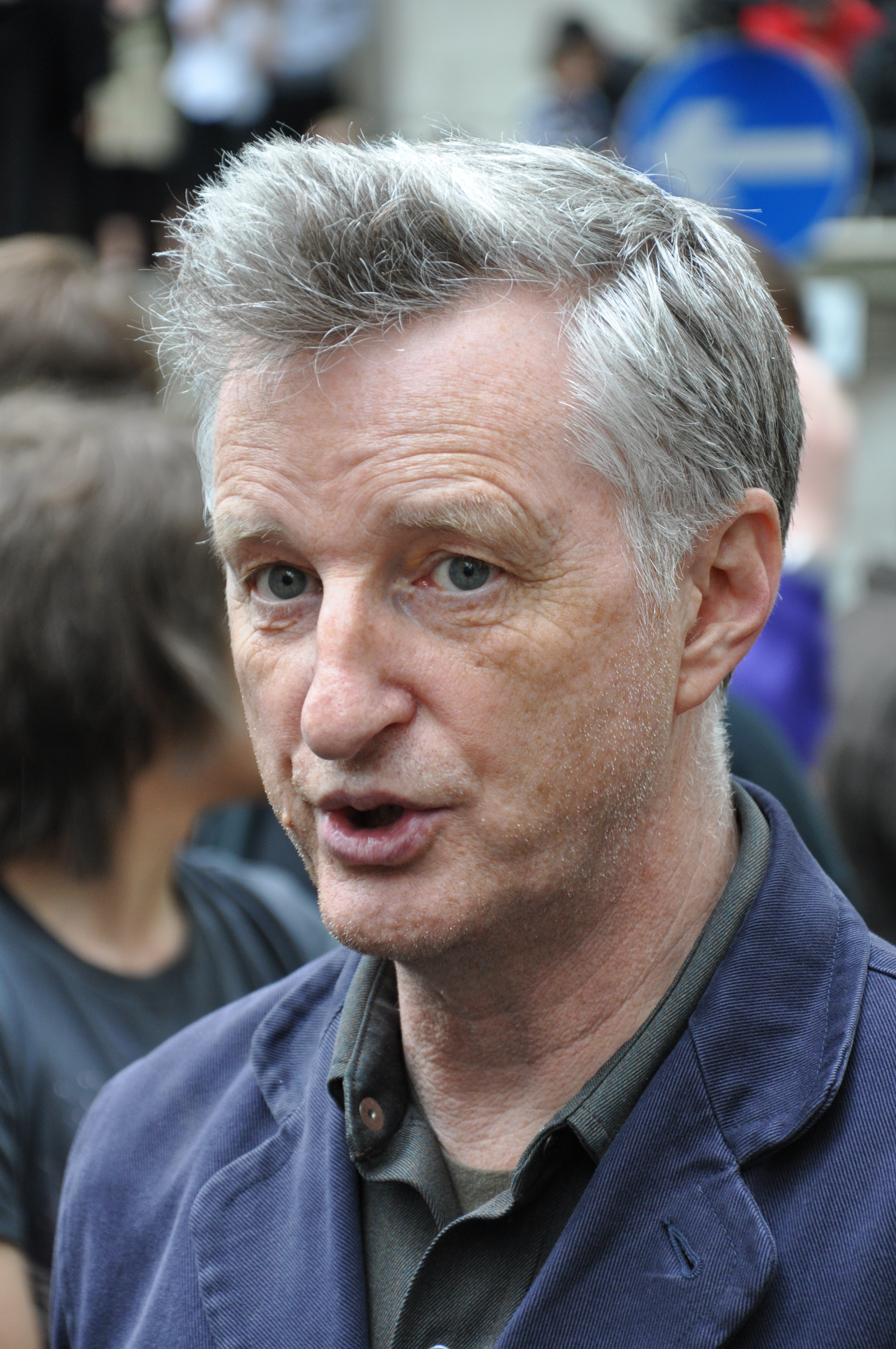
- Billy Bragg in 2010
- Studio albums: 13
- Extended plays: 5
- Live albums: 6
- Compilation albums: 13
- Singles: 31

The discography of British singer-songwriter Billy Bragg includes thirteen studio albums (including two with Wilco and one with The Blokes), six live albums, twelve compilation albums, five extended plays, and thirty-one singles.

== Albums ==
=== Studio albums ===
List of studio albums, with selected details, peak chart positions and certifications
Title	Album details	Peak chart positions							Certifications
Title	Album details	UK	AUS	BEL (FL)	CAN	NZ	SWE	US	Certifications
Life's a Riot with Spy vs Spy	Released: 1983; Label: Utility Records	30	—	—	—	45	—	—	BPI: Gold
Brewing Up with Billy Bragg	Released: 1984; Label: Go! Discs	16	—	—	—	23	—	—	BPI: Silver
Talking with the Taxman About Poetry	Released: 1986; Label: Go! Discs	8	77	—	—	5	43	—	BPI: Silver
Workers Playtime	Released: 1988; Label: Go! Discs	17	49	—	77	20	—	198	
The Internationale	Released: 1990; Label: Utility Records	34	104	—	—	—	—	—	
Don't Try This at Home	Released: 1991; Label: Go! Discs	8	35	—	—	21	—	—	BPI: Gold
William Bloke	Released: 1996; Label: Cooking Vinyl	16	72	—	—	—	—	— (Note: William Bloke did not enter the Billboard 200, but it peaked at number 38 on Billboard's Heatseekers albums chart.)	
Mermaid Avenue (with Wilco)	Released: 1998; Label: Elektra	34	12	—	—	—	—	90	BPI: Silver; ARIA: Gold
Mermaid Avenue Vol. II (with Wilco)	Released: 2000; Label: Elektra	61	45	—	54	—	—	88	
England, Half-English (with the Blokes)	Released: 2002; Label: Elektra	51	83	—	—	—	—	—	
Mr Love & Justice	Released: 2008; Label: Cooking Vinyl	33	115	78	—	—	—	—	
Tooth & Nail	Released: 2013; Label: Cooking Vinyl	13	70	69	—	—	58	—	
The Million Things That Never Happened	Released: 8 October 2021; Label: Cooking Vinyl	44	98	—	—	—	—	—	

=== Live albums ===
List of live albums, with selected details, peak chart positions and certifications
Title	Album details	Peak chart positions					Certifications
Title	Album details	UK	BEL (FL)	ITA	NL	US	Certifications
Billy Bragg and The Red Stars Live Bootleg	Released: 1995; Self-released	—	—	—	—	—	
Mermaid Avenue Tour	Released: 1999; Self-released	—	—	—	—	—	
Bill's Bargains	Released: 2002; Self-released	—	—	—	—	—	
Live at the Barbican	Released: 2006; Label: Cooking Vinyl	—	—	—	—	—	
Live at the Union Chapel, London	Released: 2014; Label: Cooking Vinyl	61	—	—	—	—	
Shine a Light: Field Recordings from the Great American Railroad (with Joe Henry)	Released: 2016; Label: Cooking Vinyl	28	138	38	112	— (Note: Shine a Light did not enter the Billboard 200, but it peaked at number 40 on Billboard's Top Rock Albums chart.)	

=== Compilation albums ===
List of compilation albums, with selected details, peak chart positions and certifications
Title	Album details	Peak chart positions		Certifications
Title	Album details	UK	AUS	Certifications
Life's a Riot / Between the Wars	Released: 1985; Label: Go! Discs	—	—	
Back to Basics	Released: 1987; Label: Elektra	37	—	
The Peel Sessions Album	Released: 1991; Label: Strange Fruit	—	—	
Victim of Geography	Released: 1993; Label: Cooking Vinyl	—	—	
Bloke on Bloke	Released: 1997; Label: Cooking Vinyl	72	—	
Reaching to the Converted	Released: 1999; Label: Cooking Vinyl	41	—	
Must I Paint You a Picture? The Essential Billy Bragg	Released: 2003; Label: Elektra	49	60	BPI: Silver
Volume 1	Released: 2006; Label: Yep Rock	—	—	
Volume 2	Released: 2006; Label: Yep Rock	—	—	
Fight Songs	Released: 2011; Label: Bragg Central	—	—	
Mermaid Avenue: The Complete Sessions (with Wilco)	Released: 2012; Label: Nonesuch	—	—	
Best of Billy Bragg at the BBC 1983–2019	Released: 2019; Label: Cooking Vinyl	— (Note: Best of Billy Bragg at the BBC 1983–2019 did not enter the Official Charts Company's UK Albums Chart, but it peaked at number 7 on the Official Independent Albums Chart.)	—	
The Roaring Forty (1983–2023)	Released: 27 October 2023; Label: Cooking Vinyl	29	190	

== Singles and EPs ==
=== As lead artist ===
List of singles as lead artist, showing selected peak chart positions
Title	Year	Peak chart positions					Album
Title	Year	UK	AUS	CAN	NZ	US Alt.	Album
"St Swithin's Day" (Note: Europe/New Zealand release)	1984	—	—	—	—	—	Brewing Up with Billy Bragg
"A Lover Sings" (Note: Promo release)	1984	—	—	—	—	—	Brewing Up with Billy Bragg
Between the Wars (EP)	1985	15	—	—	—	—	—N/a
"Days Like These"	1985	43	—	—	—	—	Non-album single
"Levi Stubbs' Tears"	1986	29	—	—	11	—	Talking with the Taxman About Poetry
"Greetings to the New Brunette"	1986	58	—	—	6	—	Talking with the Taxman About Poetry
"Ideology" (Note: Promo release)	1986	—	—	—	—	—	Talking with the Taxman About Poetry
Help Save the Youth of America (EP)	1988	—	—	—	—	—	—N/a
"She's Leaving Home" (with Cara Tivey)	1988	1	—	—	—	—	Sgt. Pepper Knew My Father
"Waiting for the Great Leap Forwards"	1988	52	—	—	34	20	Workers Playtime
"She's Got a New Spell"	1988	—	116	—	—	16	Workers Playtime
"Sexuality"	1991	27	46	60 (Note: "Sexuality" was released as part of an EP of the same name in Canada, where it charted at number 60 on the RPM 100 Albums chart.)	—	2	Don't Try This at Home
"You Woke Up My Neighbourhood"	1991	54	107	—	—	25	Don't Try This at Home
Accident Waiting to Happen (EP)	1992	33	62	—	—	—	—N/a
Live in Canada (EP) (Note: Australia-only promo release)	1992	—	—	—	—	—	—N/a
"Upfield"	1996	46	134	—	—	—	William Bloke
"The Boy Done Good"	1997	55	—	—	—	—	Bloke on Bloke
"Way Over Yonder in the Minor Key" (with Wilco)	1998	89	—	—	—	—	Mermaid Avenue
"She Came Along To Me" (EP)	1998	—	136	—	—	—	Mermaid Avenue
Mermaid Avenue Bonus EP	1998	—	—	—	—	—	Mermaid Avenue
"Secret of the Sea"	2000	—	—	—	—	—	Mermaid Avenue Vol. II
"England, Half English"/"St. Monday"	2002	98	—	—	—	—	England, Half-English
"Take Down the Union Jack"	2002	22	—	—	—	—	England, Half-English
"The Price of Oil"	2002	—	—	—	—	—	Non-album single
"We Laughed"	2005	11	—	—	—	—	Non-album single
"Old Clash Fan Fight Song" (Note: As Johnny Clash)	2007	—	—	—	—	—	Non-album single
"I Keep Faith"	2008	— (Note: "I Keep Faith" didn't enter the Official Singles Chart, but it peaked at number 14 on the Official Independent Singles Chart.)	—	—	—	—	Mr Love & Justice
"The Beach is Free" / "I Almost Killed You"	2008	—	—	—	—	—	Mr Love & Justice
Pressure Drop (EP)	2010	—	—	—	—	—	—N/a
"No-One Knows Nothing Anymore" / "Song of the Iceberg"	2013	—	—	—	—	—	Tooth & Nail
"Handyman Blues" (Note: Promo release)	2013	—	—	—	—	—	Tooth & Nail
Bridges Not Walls (EP)	2017	— (Note: Bridges Not Walls peaked at number 2 on the Official Americana Albums Chart.)	—	—	—	—	—N/a
"Can't Be There Today"	2020	—	—	—	—	—	N/A
"I Will Be Your Shield"	2021	—	—	—	—	—	The Million Things That Never Happened
"Ten Mysterious Photos That Can't Be Explained"	2021	—	—	—	—	—	The Million Things That Never Happened
"Pass It On"	2021	—	—	—	—	—	The Million Things That Never Happened
"Mid-Century Modern"	2021	—	—	—	—	—	The Million Things That Never Happened
"Hundred Year Hunger"	2025	—	—	—	—	—	Non-album single
"City of Heroes"	2026	—	—	—	—	—	Non-album single

=== As featured artist ===
List of singles as featured artist, showing selected peak chart positions
Title	Year	Peak chart positions							Album
Title	Year	UK	AUT	GER	NL	NZ	SWI	US	Album
"Won't Talk About It" (Norman Cook feat. Billy Bragg)	1989	29	27	26	28	20	24	76	Let Them Eat Bingo
