= Volume 1 (Billy Bragg album) =

2006 box set by Billy Bragg

Box set by Billy Bragg
- Released: 2006
- Recorded: 1981–1990
- Genre: Alternative folk
- Label: Yep Roc

Billy Bragg chronology
Must I Paint You a Picture? The Essential Billy Bragg (2003)	Volume 1 (2006)	Volume 2 (2006)

Professional ratings
Review scores
Source	Rating
Allmusic	4.5/5 stars
Pitchfork Media	(7.4/10)

Volume 1 is a box set by alternative folk singer-songwriter Billy Bragg, released in 2006. The box set includes 7 CDs and 2 DVDs with a booklet containing song lyrics and an introduction by Wiggy, producer of several of Bragg's albums.

Though Workers Playtime was released in 1988, it has been made part of Volume 2 while The Internationale, which was published in 1990, is the fourth album reprised here. Thus, the two sets are not fully chronological.

== Track listing ==
All songs written by Billy Bragg, except where noted

=== Disc 1 (Life's a Riot with Spy vs Spy – Original Album) ===
1. "The Milkman of Human Kindness" – 2:49
2. "To Have and to Have Not" – 2:33
3. "Richard" – 2:51
4. "A New England" – 2:14
5. "The Man in the Iron Mask" – 2:13
6. "The Busy Girl Buys Beauty" – 1:58
7. "Lovers Town Revisited" – 1:19

=== Disc 2 (Life's a Riot with Spy vs Spy – Bonus CD) ===
1. "Strange Things Happen" (alternative version) – 3:19
2. "The Cloth I" – 2:50
3. "Love Lives Here" – 1:42
4. "Speedway Hero" – 2:39
5. "Loving You Too Long" – 2:51
6. "The Guitar Says Sorry" (alternative version) – 2:14
7. "Love Gets Dangerous" (alternative version) – 2:32
8. "The Cloth II" – 2:47
9. "The Man in the Iron Mask" (alternative version) – 2:17
10. "A13, Trunk Road to the Sea" (music by Bobby Troup, words by Bragg) – 2:27
11. "Fear Is a Man's Best Friend" (John Cale) – 2:32

=== Disc 3 (Brewing Up with Billy Bragg – Original Album) ===
1. "It Says Here" – 4:18
2. "Love Gets Dangerous" – 2:23
3. "The Myth of Trust" – 2:54
4. "From a Vauxhall Velox" – 2:31
5. "The Saturday Boy" – 3:30
6. "Island of No Return" – 3:37
7. "St Swithin's Day" – 3:54
8. "Like Soldiers Do" – 2:39
9. "This Guitar Says Sorry" – 2:31
10. "Strange Things Happen" – 2:38
11. "A Lover Sings" – 3:54

=== Disc 4 (Brewing Up with Billy Bragg – Bonus CD) ===
1. "It Must Be a River" – 2:19
2. "I Won't Talk About It" – 5:06
3. "Talking Wag Club Blues" – 2:59
4. "You Got the Power" (James Brown, George Terry) – 3:10
5. "The Last Time" (Mick Jagger, Keith Richards) – 2:55
6. "Back to the Old House" (Morrissey, Johnny Marr) – 2:53
7. "A Lover Sings" (alternative version) – 3:58
8. "Which Side Are You On?" (Florence Reece, Bragg) – 2:34
9. "It Says Here" (alternate version) – 2:36
10. "Between the Wars" – 2:30
11. "The World Turned Upside Down" (Leon Rosselson) – 2:35

=== Disc 5 (Talking with the Taxman About Poetry – Original Album) ===
1. "Greetings to the New Brunette" – 3:29
2. "Train Train" (Zenon De Fleur) – 2:11
3. "The Marriage" – 2:30
4. "Ideology" (Bragg, Bob Dylan) – 3:27
5. "Levi Stubbs' Tears" – 3:28
6. "Honey, I'm a Big Boy Now" – 4:05
7. "There Is Power in a Union" (Bragg, George Frederick Root) – 2:47
8. "Help Save the Youth of America" – 2:45
9. "Wishing the Days Away" – 2:28
10. "The Passion" – 2:52
11. "The Warmest Room" – 3:55
12. "The Home Front" – 4:09

=== Disc 6 (Talking with the Taxman About Poetry – Bonus CD) ===
1. "Sin City" (Gram Parsons, Chris Hillman) – 3:34
2. "Deportees" (Woody Guthrie, Martin Hoffman) – 4:03
3. "There is Power in a Union" (instrumental) (George Root) – 3:16
4. "The Tracks of My Tears" (Smokey Robinson, Warren Moore, Marvin Tarplin) – 2:56
5. "Wishing the Days Away" (alternate version) – 2:32
6. "The Clashing of Ideologies" (alternate version) – 2:52
7. "Greetings to the New Brunette" (demo version) – 3:57
8. "A Nurse's Life is Full of Woe" – 2:48
9. "Only Bad Signs" – 3:10
10. "Hold the Fort" (traditional) – 1:47

=== Disc 7 (The Internationale – Original Album / Help Save the Youth of America: Live & Dubious EP / Bonus Tracks) ===
1. "The Internationale" (Pierre De Geyter, Billy Bragg) – 3:45
2. "I Dreamed I Saw Phil Ochs Last Night" (Earl Robinson, Bragg) – 1:27
3. "The Marching Song of the Covert Battalions" (Bragg) – 3:59
4. "Blake's Jerusalem" (William Blake, Hubert Parry) – 2:30
5. "Nicaragua Nicaraguita" (Carlos Mejía Godoy) – 1:06
6. "The Red Flag" (Jim Connell, traditional) – 3:12
7. "My Youngest Son Came Home Today" (Eric Bogle) – 3:04
8. "Introduction" (live) – 0:57
9. "Help Save the Youth of America" (live) (Bragg) – 2:36
10. "Think Again" (live) (Dick Gaughan) – 4:21
11. "Chile Your Waters Run Red Through Soweto" (Bernice Johnson Reagon) – 3:09
12. "Days Like These" (DC remix) (Bragg) – 2:40
13. "To Have and to Have Not" (live) (Bragg) – 2:47
14. "There Is Power in a Union" (with The Pattersons) (Bragg, George F. Root, traditional) – 3:27
15. "Joe Hill" (Phil Ochs) – 8:23
16. "This Land Is Your Land" (Woody Guthrie) – 4:35
17. "Never Cross a Picket Line" (Bragg) – 3:38
18. "A Change Is Gonna Come" (Sam Cooke) – 3:58
19. "A Miner's Life" (traditional) – 3:01

=== Disc 8 (Bonus DVD – Here And There) ===
East Berlin DDR – February 1986

1. "There Is Power in a Union" (live) (Bragg, Root, traditional) – 2:35
2. "Between the Wars" (live) (Bragg) – 2:31

Nicaragua – July 1987

1. "Nicaragua Nicaraguita" (live) (Godoy) – 1:07

Lithuania USSR – May 1988

1. "I Heard It Through the Grapevine" (live) (Norman Whitfield, Barrett Strong) – 2:07
2. "To Have and to Have Not" (live) (Bragg) – 2:21
3. "The Milkman of Human Kindness" (live) (Bragg) – 2:29
4. "Island of No Return" (live) (Bragg) – 3:24
5. "Introduction to Between the Wars" (live) – 3:15
6. "Between the Wars" (live) (Bragg) – 2:21
7. "The World Turned Upside Down" (live) (Leon Rosselson) – 3:02
8. "Levi Stubbs' Tears" (live) (Bragg) – 3:15
9. "Help Save the Youth of America" (live) (Bragg) – 2:36
10. "A New England" (Bragg) – 2:04
11. "Wishing the Days Away" (Bragg) – 4:15
12. "People Get Ready" (Curtis Mayfield) / "Tupelo Honey" (Van Morrison) – 3:02
13. "Star" (David Bowie) – 1:56
14. "A13, Trunk Road to The Sea" (Bobby Troup) – 2:17

=== Disc: 9 (Boxed Set Bonus DVD – From The West Down To The East) ===
The South Bank Show, March 1985 (TV Special)

1. "(intro)" – 0:37
2. "To Have And To Have Not" – 2:54
3. "A13, Trunk Road To The Sea" – 5:30
4. "Island Of No Return" – 4:12
5. "A Lover Sings" – 3:56
6. "A New England" – 2:59
7. "Which Side Are You On?" – 3:12
8. "Between The Wars" – 2:19

East Berlin DDR, August 1986 (Live Concert)

1. "(intro)" – 0:13
2. "Lovers Town Revisited" – 1:16
3. "Levi Stubbs' Tears" – 3:27
4. "The World Turned Upside Down" – 3:07
5. "It Says Here" – 2:16
6. "Island Of No Return" – 6:48
7. "Which Side Are You On?" – 2:24
8. "Love Gets Dangerous" – 2:53
9. "Richard" – 2:22
10. "Train Train" – 2:22
11. "A New England" – 2:33
