= Volume 2 (Billy Bragg album) =

Box set by Billy Bragg
- Released: October 17, 2006
- Label: Cooking Vinyl

Billy Bragg chronology
Volume 1 (2006)	Volume 2 (2006)	Mr. Love & Justice (2008)

Volume 2 is a box set by political folk singer-songwriter Billy Bragg, released in 2006.

== Track listing ==
=== Disk 1 (Workers Playtime) ===
1. "She's Got a New Spell" – 3:26
2. "Must I Paint You a Picture?" (Extended Version 7:08 Minutes) – 5:32
3. "Tender Comrade" – 2:50
4. "The Price I Pay" – 3:34
5. "Little Time Bomb" – 2:17
6. "Rotting on Remand" – 3:37
7. "Valentine's Day is Over" – 4:53
8. "Life With the Lions" – 3:06
9. "The Only One" – 3:26
10. "The Short Answer" – 4:59
11. "Waiting for the Great Leap Forwards" – 4:35

=== Disc 2 (Workers Playtime Bonus Tracks) ===
1. "The Only One" (demo version) – 3:36
2. "The Price I Pay" (demo version) – 4:01
3. "Love Has No Pride" (Eric Kaz, Libby Titus) – 3:35
4. "That's Entertainment" (Paul Weller) – 3:53
5. "She's Got a New Spell" (demo version) – 2:44
6. "The Short Answer" (demo version) – 5:21
7. "Little Time Bomb" (demo version) – 2:21
8. "Bad Penny" (demo version) – 3:05
9. "Reason to Believe" (live) (Tim Hardin) – 2:12
10. "Must I Paint You a Picture?" (extended version) – 7:13
11. "Raglan Road" (live) (Patrick Kavanagh, traditional) – 3:46

=== Disc 3 (Don't Try This at Home) ===
1. "Accident Waiting to Happen" – 4:01
2. "Moving the Goalposts" – 2:34
3. "Everywhere" (Greg Trooper, Sid Griffin) – 5:01
4. "Cindy of a Thousand Lives" – 4:15
5. "You Woke Up My Neighbourhood" (Bragg, Peter Buck) – 3:11
6. "Trust" – 4:13
7. "God's Footballer" – 3:04
8. "The Few" – 3:27
9. "Sexuality" (Bragg, Johnny Marr) – 3:49
10. "Mother of the Bride" – 3:36
11. "Tank Park Salute" – 3:30
12. "Dolphins" (Fred Neil) – 4:20
13. "North Sea Bubble" – 3:19
14. "Rumours of War" – 2:50
15. "Wish You Were Her" – 2:46
16. "Body of Water" (Bragg, Philip Wigg a.k.a. "Wiggy") – 3:58

=== Disc 4 (Don't Try This at Home Bonus Tracks) ===
1. "Party of God" (Lead vocals by Natalie Merchant) – 4:15
2. "North Sea Bubble" (demo) – 3:30
3. "Sexuality" (demo) – 3:54
4. "Just One Victory" (Todd Rundgren) – 5:31
5. "Everywhere" – 4:42
6. "Trust (demo)" – 5:43
7. "Bread & Circuses" (Natalie Merchant) – 4:28
8. "Cindy of a Thousand Lives (demo)" – 3:38
9. "The Few (demo)" – 3:50
10. "Revolution" (John Lennon, Paul McCartney) – 1:51
11. "Tighten up your Wig" (with The Athenians and DJ Woody Dee) – 3:18
12. "MBH" – 2:07
13. "This Gulf Between Us" – 2:46
14. "Picadilly Rambler" – 1:49

=== Disc 5 (William Bloke) ===
1. "From Red to Blue" – 3:21
2. "Upfield" – 4:07
3. "Everybody Loves You Babe" – 3:10
4. "Sugar Daddy" – 4:37
5. "A Pict Song" (words: Rudyard Kipling) – 4:56
6. "Brickbat" – 3:14
7. "The Space Race Is Over" – 4:26
8. "Northern Industrial Town" – 2:58
9. "The Fourteenth of February" – 3:27
10. "King James Version" – 3:21
11. "Goalhanger" – 3:47

=== Disc 6 (William Bloke Bonus Tracks) ===
1. "As Long As You Hold Me" [demo] – 3:26
2. "Who's Gonna Shoe Your Pretty Little Feet" [demo] – 1:42
3. "Sugardaddy" [demo] – 4:07
4. "Space Race Is Over" [demo] – 5:10
5. "Goalhanger" [demo] – 2:43
6. "Upfield" [demo] – 5:03
7. "Fourteenth of February" [demo] – 3:26
8. "Qualifications" – 1:48
9. "Never Had No One Ever" – 3:40
10. "Thatcherites" – 4:13
11. "All Fall Down" – 3:34

=== Disc 7 (England, Half-English) ===
1. "St. Monday" – 3:04
2. "Jane Allen" (Ian McLagan, Martyn Barker, Lu Edmonds, Ben Mandelson, Billy Bragg & the Blokes) – 3:58
3. "Distant Shore" (Ian McLagan, Martyn Barker, Lu Edmonds, Ben Mandelson, Billy Bragg & the Blokes) – 2:30
4. "England, Half English" (Ian McLagan, Martyn Barker, Lu Edmonds, Ben Mandelson, Billy Bragg & the Blokes) – 2:29
5. "NPWA (No Power Without Accountability)" (Billy Bragg & the Blokes) – 5:31
6. "Some Days I See The Point" – 4:59
7. "Baby Faroukh" (Billy Bragg, Ian McLagan, Martyn Barker, Lu Edmonds, Ben Mandelson) – 3:06
8. "Take Down The Union Jack" – 3:20
9. "Another Kind of Judy" – 3:44
10. "He'll Go Down" – 3:21
11. "Dreadbelly" (Ian McLagan, Martyn Barker, Lu Edmonds, Ben Mandelson, Billy Bragg & the Blokes) – 3:33
12. "Tears of My Tracks" – 3:53

=== Disc 8 (England Half-English Bonus Tracks) ===
1. "Billericay Dickie" – 4:46
2. "Mansion on the Hill" – 4:20
3. "Glad And Sorry" – 4:08
4. "He'll Go Down" (demo) – 3:31
5. "Yarra Song" – 3:33
6. "You Pulled The Carpet Out" – 2:38
7. "Mystery Shoes" – 3:09
8. "Tears of my Tracks" (demo) – 3:20
9. "Take Down The Union Jack" (band version) – 3:22
10. "England, Half English" (7" remix) – 3:56
11. "1 2 3 4" – 2:05
12. "Dry Bed" (band version) – 3:19
13. "Danny Rose" – 2:27
14. "She Smiled Sweetly" – 2:50

=== Disc: 9 (If You've Got A Guestlist – Live DVD) ===
At The Town & Country Club November 1991

1. "You Woke Up My Neighbourhood" – 3:08
2. "The Saturday Boy" – 4:53
3. "The Marching Song Of The Covert Battalions" – 3:43
4. "The World Turned Upside Down" – 2:18
5. "Dolphins" – 3:11
6. "Valentine's Day Is Over" – 3:28
7. "North Sea Bubble" – 4:30
8. "Body Of Water" – 5:07
9. "Levi Stubbs' Tears" – 3:39
10. "A Lover Sings" – 4:11
11. "She's Got A New Spell" – 4:01
12. "Cindy Of A Thousand Lives" – 6:39
13. "Accident Waiting To Happen" – 5:26
14. "Waiting For The Great Leap Forwards" – 6:40
15. "Tender Comrade" – 1:57
16. "Tank Park Salute" – 4:19
17. "The Warmest Room" – 6:09
18. "Sexuality" – 7:19

At The Broadway, Barking May 2006

1. "(Intro)" – 0:47
2. "A Lover Sings" – 3:54
3. "The Price I Pay" – 3:35
4. "Debris" – 4:49
5. "Tank Park Salute" – 4:50
6. "All You Fascists" – 3:13
7. "Waiting For The Great Leap Forwards" – 5:17
8. "A13 Trunk Road To The Sea" – 3:40

=== Bonus live disc ===
Live at Victoria University, Wellington, New Zealand – March 1, 1987. (The bonus disc was available only to pre-order purchasers of the box set.)

1. Ever Fallen in Love?
2. The Milkman of Human Kindness
3. Scholarship is the Enemy of Romance
4. Greetings to the New Brunette
5. Help Save the Youth of America
6. Levi Stubbs' Tears
7. Ideology
8. The Saturday Boy
9. The Warmest Room
10. Days Like These
11. To Have and To Have Not
12. Between the Wars
13. A New England
