= Grant Showbiz =

British record producer principally

Grant Showbiz (real name Grant Cunliffe) is a British record producer principally known for his work with the Fall, the Smiths, and Billy Bragg plus as an artist in his own right with Moodswings. He has worked on more albums by both the Fall (15) and Billy Bragg (14) than any other producer, and continues to work with Bragg. Showbiz has been awarded Gold Records for the Smiths' Rank, Billy Bragg's Don't Try This At Home and the Wilco/Bragg collaboration Mermaid Avenue Vol. 1, and received Grammy nominations for both Mermaid Avenue Vol. 1 and Vol. 2.

== Career ==
Showbiz started as a soundman for anarcho-hippypunks Here & Now in 1976. Showbiz ran the sound and stage at many free festivals such as Windsor and Stonehenge. Stamping his personality on proceedings, using a microphone plugged into the soundboard, he would often amiably harangue those onstage to get on with it, or off, as circumstances might merit. He quickly forged links with the punk scene, producing albums for Alternative TV and the Fall. In 1979 he set up the Ladbroke Grove-based Street-Level Studio with Kif Kif (ex drummer of Here & Now) and José Gross (ex keyboard player from Here & Now, guitarist from Blank Space and the Real Imitations), going on to record a swathe of bands including the Fall, Alternative TV, Mark Perrys' Good Missionaries, The Door And The Window, 012, World Domination Enterprises, the Mob, Impossible Dreamers, the Astronauts, Blyth Power, Brian Brain, the Petticoats, Androids Of Mu, the Instant Automatons & Take It - many released on the associated pioneering DIY record label Fuck Off Records. At this time Showbiz also began making music himself, playing bass in Blue Midnight (who he continues to record & play live with).

Through connections with Rough Trade Showbiz became the Smiths live sound engineer, working with them from their fifth gig until their last gig in 1986. He produced their live album Rank and recorded their last ever tracks "Work Is a Four Letter Word" and "I Keep Mine Hidden". He filmed a backstage video, Reel Around the Fountain, of their 1984 UK tour and recorded most of their live shows.

From 1989, Showbiz was member of Moodswings through their 1997 album, Psychedelicatessen.

Showbiz continues to tour as sound engineer for Billy Bragg.

== Personal life ==
He is married to Frank Chickens frontwoman Kazuko Hohki.

== Discography ==
=== Blue Midnight ===
==== Albums ====
- Love Not Devotion
- Le Bal Des Idiots
- Blue Midnight
- Father Of Apples
- Balance

==== Singles ====
- "Blues Exterminator" (from the Street-Level E.P.)
- "Just A Dream"

=== Billy Bragg ===
==== Albums ====
- The Internationale (1990)
- Don't Try This at Home (1991)
- William Bloke (1996)
- Bloke On Bloke (1997)
- Mermaid Avenue Vol 1 (1998, with Wilco and Natalie Merchant)
- Reaching to the Converted (1999)
- Mermaid Avenue Vol. 2 (2000, with Wilco)
- Bill's Bargains (2002)
- Must I Paint You a Picture? The Essential Billy Bragg
- England, Half-English (2002)
- Live At the Barbican
- Boxsets Vol 1 & 2
- Mr Love & Justice
- Pressure Drop

==== Singles ====
- "The Boy Done Good"
- "Take Down the Union Jack"
- "Johnny Clash"

=== The Fall ===
==== Albums ====
- Dragnet (1979)
- Totale's Turns (1980)
- Grotesque (After the Gramme) (1980)
- Slates (1981)
- Hex Enduction Hour (1982)
- A Part of America Therein, 1981 (1982)
- The Frenz Experiment (1988)
- Shiftwork (1991)
- The Twenty-Seven Points (1995)
- The Legendary Chaos Tapes (1996)
- The Unutterable (2000)
- The Real New Fall LP (Formerly Country on the Click) (2003)
- Live At Deeply Vale (2005)
- Imperial Wax Solvent (2008)
- Last Night at The Palais (2009)
- Re-Mit (2013)

==== Singles ====
- "There's a Ghost in My House" (1987)
- "Hi Tension Line" (1990)
- "The Chiselers" (1996)

=== The Smiths ===
==== Album ====
- Rank (1988)

==== B sides ====
- "Nowhere Fast"
- "Stretch Out and Wait"
- "Shakespeare's Sister"
- "Meat Is Murder"
- "Work Is A Four Letter Word"
- "I Keep Mine Hidden"

=== Moodswings ===
==== Albums ====
- Moodfood
- Live At Leeds
- Psychedelicatessen
