= Fight Songs (Billy Bragg album) =

2011 compilation album by Billy Bragg

Compilation album by Billy Bragg
- Released: October 19, 2011
- Label: Bragg Central Ltd

Billy Bragg chronology
Six Songs From Pressure Drop (2010)	Fight Songs (2011)	Mermaid Avenue: The Complete Sessions (2012)

Fight Songs is a compilation of songs by Billy Bragg that had previously been released as free digital downloads. This album was released in October 2011. Most of the songs are political in nature, but a Christmas song, "We’re Following the Wrong Star", is also included.

Describing why he decided to release this album, Bragg said... "Since I started giving away music for free on the internet in 2002 with The Price of Oil, I’ve felt a little bit like I’ve been pissing in the wind, so to speak, that the ideas that I’ve been putting out there have not really been in keeping with what’s going on in the music industry. But the last couple of years, since the crash in 2008, I think the idea of polemical songs has become more and more relevant, so it now seems like a good time to collect these together and make them available for people who may only have tuned in a few years ago."

== Track listing ==
1. "Never Buy The Sun" – 3:43
2. "Last Flight to Abu Dhabi" – 2:04
3. "The Battle of Barking" – 2:18
4. "The Wolf Covers Its Tracks" – 4:23
5. "The Big Lie" – 2:03
6. "Bush War Blues" – 3:39
7. "Constitution Hill" – 2:29
8. "Old Clash Fan Fight Song" – 2:33
9. "The Price of Oil" – 4:49
10. "The Lonesome Death of Rachel Corrie" – 4:51
11. "We're Following The Wrong Star" – 4:09
