= We Laughed =

Single by Billy Bragg

Single by Rosetta Life featuring Billy Bragg
- Released: 31 October 2005
- Genre: Folk, country, pop, rock
- Length: 11:04
- Label: Cooking Vinyl
- Songwriters: Billy Bragg (all tracks); Maxine Edgington (track 1); Lisa Payne (track 2); Veronica Barfoot (track 3)
- Producer: Robbie McIntosh

Billy Bragg singles chronology
"Take Down the Union Jack" (2002)	"We Laughed" (2005)	"I Keep Faith" (2008)

"We Laughed" is a three-track single by English musician Billy Bragg as part of the Rosetta Life project. The single was released in 2005 in the UK and peaked at No. 11. It also reached No. 38 in Ireland in 2006. For the three songs on the single, Bragg collaborated with three patients of Trimar Hospice in Weymouth, who each wrote lyrics based on their illness and feelings. The songs were produced by English guitarist Robbie McIntosh.

== Background ==
The "We Laughed" single was created through the Rosetta Life organisation, which collaborates with professional artists, enabling people with life-threatening illnesses to express themselves using various types of creative outlets, including writing, music, drama and dance. The organisation's Rosetta Requiem focuses on music in particular.

The three tracks developed from Bragg's songwriting workshops at Weymouth's Trimar Hospice in February–March 2005. After the songs were written, Bragg recorded them with local musicians in June. At the time, Billy Bragg described working with the three women:

Every Friday morning for six weeks, I worked with half a dozen women who came to the hospice for palliative care as they fought against the effects of breast cancer. After a couple of weeks of talking about the process of songwriting and a few singalongs, the 'Friday Girls' began opening up to the idea of writing a song. Maxine Edgington had the clearest idea of what she wanted to do. In our first one-on-one session, she pulled a framed picture out of her bag and said "Look, I've been given six months to live. I don't want to mess about. I want to write the song of this picture". Over the following weeks, she wrote reams of words. My job was to take the words that best expressed the sentiments in the photograph and shape them into a song. I provided the melody, but the words are Maxine's alone. She called the song "We Laughed". The additional tracks feature lyrics written by two of the 'Friday Girls', Lisa Payne and Veronica Barfoot. That there is not a shred of self-pity or morbidity in any of these songs is a testament to the spirit of these three women. I found the experience of collaborating with them to be inspirational.

In a 2005 BBC article based on the song, Bragg spoke of meeting the patients who co-wrote the tracks for the single:

It was a great privilege actually to be able to work with them, to sit with them and talk with them and try and get their feelings and thoughts down on paper. I found it to be an inspiration. When we said 'we want to make a record', they [Rosetta Life] said 'OK, here's some money to make a record'. They've been so supportive, they've given Maxine, Veronica and Lisa their voices back, which is a great thing to do.

Upon release, the single was well-received critically. "We Laughed" was first aired on Jeremy Vine's BBC Radio 2 programme on 20 September. Many listeners contacted the show to find out how they could get a copy of the song. With no commercial backing, the song was reliant on free promotion and word-of-mouth recommendations. The single reached No. 11 in the UK, spending five weeks on the chart. After a final chart appearance at No. 57 on 10 December, the song briefly re-appeared in the Top 200 on 14 January 2006, placed at No. 199. In Ireland, the song reached No. 38 in March 2006, spending two weeks on the chart.

In a January 2010 interview for The Guardian, Bragg was asked if there was anything he regretted looking back on his career. He replied: "Yes. A few years ago I worked on a record called "We Laughed" with some incredible women in a hospice. We got the single to No. 11 in the charts. But now that those women are no longer with us, I sometimes wonder whether I could have done more for them."

The singer on the tracks, Helena Eden (officially credited on the single as Helena), would also record a solo acoustic version of "We Laughed" for her solo album, as well as a live version that appeared on her live album Feels Like Coming Home (The Live Sessions).

== Promotion ==
In April 2005, the first performance of "We Laughed" featured Bragg solely performing the song to an audience of patients, hospice staff and volunteers at the Trimar Hospice. In 2006, the song was performed by the Rosetta Life band on The Late, Late, Show in Ireland.

== Songs ==
=== We Laughed ===
We Laughed was written by Bragg and Maxine Edgington. The song was inspired by a photograph of Maxine with her teenage daughter Jessica.

For the Rosetta Requiem website, Edgington described the photograph that was the inspiration of the song:

The picture is a legacy for Jess, a reminder to laugh with her children. The prospect of me seeing them were small so I wanted us captured in a pose that they could aspire to and that Jess would remember fondly. I also wanted her children to have a complete understanding of who I was - not a harsh stern grand parent but one that was fun and would love them and be good to know so We Laughed, relaxed and free.

Speaking on writing the lyrics, Edgington said:

I was sceptical at first as I thought that so many other things needed major attention - such as finding some one who would look after my daughter and be her guardian after I had gone. However I was drawn to the project and it turned out to be the opening of the door that I sought. Billy Bragg was to give me a creative opportunity and this was to be my path to freedom and hope. Somehow in the process of writing with Billy Bragg I had found the freedom to become whole.

In a BBC article based on the single, Edgington revealed: "I actually wrote 30 pages of all my feelings, and my emotions and what I felt, and from that I felt I had a whole balance come into my life. Yes, there were many things I had regrets about but there were an enormous amount of things I wanted to revisit, do again because they were such good fun... I understood that death wasn't just about me."

=== The Light Within ===
The Light Within was written by Bragg and Lisa Payne. In the lyrics, Payne described the inner strength she discovered through her illness.

For the Rosetta Requiem website, Payne described working on the song:

I'd been coming to Trimar Hospice when we learnt that Billy Bragg was coming to help us write songs. I was panicking, I thought "I won't be able to that", I think we all did. If we hadn't been given a push, I don't think I would have had the courage to do it. I had heard of Billy Bragg but I didn’t know what he'd be like to work with, I just knew him from seeing him do political stuff on the television. Once we went away and worked one to one, I was pleasantly surprised how nice he was, and how easy he was to work with. I knew how I felt about my illness and he helped me express it, he gave me ideas about ways of turning my experience into a song.

Speaking of the song, Payne commented: "It was scary when I first heard it, I couldn't quite believe it. It expressed what I felt and the upbeat music suited the words and the way I've been tackling the illness. I'm not too bothered about it being on the CD, I care more about it pleasing my family and helping other people."

=== My Guiding Star ===
My Guiding Star is by Bragg and Veronica Barfoot. The song was inspired by Barfoot's husband and their strengthened relationship since he became her carer. Since her illness, the couple had retaken their wedding vows.

For the Rosetta Requiem website, Barfoot commented:

I was asked if I would like to go the Trimar Hospice Day Care every Friday. My first thoughts were "Oh no, this is the end." I thought that everybody would be sitting in their chairs feeling depressed, but it wasn't quite like that. I was encouraged to write a song as part of the Rosetta Life project with Billy Bragg. I thought, "No way, I can't do that." Then the words came to me for this song which I have dedicated to my husband who has helped me come through all of this.

== Track listing ==
CD Single

1. "We Laughed (Full Length)" – 4:34
2. "The Light Within" – 3:02
3. "My Guiding Star" – 3:25

== Chart performance ==
Chart (2005)	Peak position
UK Singles Chart	11

Chart (2006)	Peak position
Irish Singles Chart	38
UK Singles Chart	199

== Personnel ==
- Helena – vocals
- Billy Bragg – acoustic rhythm guitar
- Robbie McIntosh – guitar, percussion, producer
- Julie Lewis – piano
- Chris Lonergan – bass
- Ady Milward – drums
- Mike Hallett – engineer
