= Mr Love & Justice =

2008 studio album by Billy Bragg

Studio album by Billy Bragg
- Released: 3 March 2008
- Recorded: Band version: September 2006 – March 2007; Solo version: September 2007
- Genre: Rock
- Labels: Cooking Vinyl, ANTI-, Shock
- Producer: Grant Showbiz

Billy Bragg chronology
| Volume 2 (2006) | Mr Love & Justice (2008) | Six Songs From Pressure Drop (2010) |

Singles from Mr Love & Justice
- 1. "I Keep Faith" Released: 17 March 2008; 2. "The Beach Is Free" / "I Almost Killed You" Released: 21 July 2008

Mr Love & Justice is the twelfth studio album by folk-rock musician Billy Bragg, and the second to be recorded with his backing band the Blokes. The title is taken from the 1960 novel by Colin MacInnes.

Two versions are available on CD. The first is a single-disc album featuring the Blokes, the second is a limited-edition double-disc release. Disc one is the same as the standard issue, but is referred to as Band Version; the second disc, Solo Version, contains the same twelve tracks performed just by Bragg with electric and acoustic guitars.

The album was recorded at Chapel Studios, Lincolnshire in March 2007, with additional recordings taken from a session that was recorded at The Butchers Shop, London NW5 in September 2006. The solo version of the album was recorded by Bragg at Mojo Sound Studios in Devon in September 2007. The cover photograph was taken at 474 Broome Street, SoHo, New York City by Anthony Saint James.

The first single to be released from the album was "I Keep Faith", which was released on limited edition 7" on 17 March 2008.

The second single from the album was a double a-side of "The Beach Is Free" and "I Almost Killed You" which was released as a download single on 21 July 2008.

Franz Nicolay, of the Hold Steady, listed Mr Love & Justice as one of his favourite albums of 2008.

== Reception ==
Professional ratings
Aggregate scores
| Source | Rating |
|---|---|
| Metacritic | 71/100 |
Review scores
| Source | Rating |
| AllMusic | 4/5 stars |
| Crawdaddy! | (favourable) |
| Drowned in Sound | 4/10 |
| Los Angeles Times | 2.5/4 stars |
| musicOMH | 2/5 stars |
| Observer Music Monthly | 4/5 stars |
| Pitchfork Media | 6.5/10 |
| PopMatters | 5/10 stars |
| Punknews.org | 4/5 stars |
| Uncut | 4/5 stars |

The album so far has a score of 71 out of 100 from Metacritic based on "generally favorable reviews". Filter gave the album a score of 82 out of 100 and said, "Flourishes of horns add to the traditional band instrumentation, giving Bragg a solid foundation on which to convey his message." Paste gave the album a favorable review and said that "Rather than being a return to form, it’s a leap forward in maturity, depth and nuance." Billboard gave the album a favorable review and said of Bragg, "Whether you prefer him shouting vitriol on the picket line or whispering sweet nothings in the bedroom, you'll find plenty to enjoy here." The Village Voice likewise gave it a favorable review and called it "classic Bragg: frequently fantastic folk-rock that keeps both the faith and your attention." The Boston Globe likewise gave it a favorable review and stated, "Bragg colors his brilliant Cockney-accented discourse with Appalachian folk on the Woody Guthrie-influenced 'O Freedom,' where he protests, 'Freedom, what liberties are taken in thy name?' On 'I Keep Faith,' which features Soft Machine legend Robert Wyatt, he taps classic soul."

The Phoenix gave the album three stars out of four and said it isn’t without its misfires [...] but it is Bragg’s most assured statement since hooking up with Wilco a decade ago to give life to lost Woody Guthrie lyrics." The A.V. Club gave the album a B and said that while Bragg "doesn't scale the heights he achieved on earlier albums, at least the mountains are visible from here." Spin gave it a score of seven out of ten and said that "Bragg gets the balance of message and music just about right."

Other reviews are pretty average or mixed: Q gave the album three stars out of five and said that the Blokes "too often impede [Bragg's] thoughtful lyrics." Hot Press gave the album an average review and stated: "Bragg is taking stock. He’s now doing it for himself, at his own pace. Those in search of revelation from an old punk with a new perspective will be left hanging." BBC Music gave the album a mixed review and said it was "not at all bad, but compared to Bragg's own Talking with the Taxman About Poetry or Workers Playtime it doesn't fare at all well." Now gave the album two stars out of five and said that it "finds [Bragg] in his comfort zone provided by the Blokes and producer Grant Showbiz under yet another title copped from novelist Colin MacInnes."

== Track listing ==
All songs written by Billy Bragg.

1. "I Keep Faith"
2. "I Almost Killed You"
3. "M for Me"
4. "The Beach Is Free"
5. "Sing Their Souls Back Home"
6. "You Make Me Brave"
7. "Something Happened"
8. "Mr Love & Justice"
9. "If You Ever Leave"
10. "O Freedom"
11. "The Johnny Carcinogenic Show"
12. "Farm Boy"

Japanese bonus tracks

13. "Ash Wednesday"
14. "Goodbye, Goodbye"

== Personnel ==
- Billy Bragg – vocals, acoustic guitar, electric guitar
- Ben Mandelson – mandolin, baritone bouzouki, harmonica, lap steel guitar, electric bouzouki, tenor guitar, electric guitar
- Lu Edmonds – cümbüş, electric guitar.
- Ian McLagan – Hammond B3, piano, Wurlitzer
- Simon Edwards – double bass, electric bass, marímbula, handclaps
- Martyn Barker – Hang, EFX cymbal, drums, handclaps, shaker, snare, bass drum, bongos, reco reco, Ride cymbal, tambourine, cajón, mazhar, calabash
- Nic Waterhouse – tambourine on "M for Me"
- Robert Wyatt – backing vocals on "I Keep Faith"
- May Fitzpatrick – backing vocals on "Sing Their Souls Back Home" and "The Johnny Carcinogenic Show"
