= Mermaid Avenue: The Complete Sessions =

2012 box set by Billy Bragg and Wilco

Box set by Billy Bragg and Wilco
- Released: April 21, 2012
- Recorded: 1997–1998
- Studios: Boston, Chicago, and Dublin
- Language: English
- Label: Nonesuch
- Producers: Wilco, Billy Bragg, Grant Showbiz

Billy Bragg chronology
Fight Songs (2011)	Mermaid Avenue: The Complete Sessions (2012)	Tooth & Nail (2013)

Wilco chronology
iTunes Session (2012)	Mermaid Avenue: The Complete Sessions (2012)	Star Wars (2015)

Billy Bragg & Wilco chronology
Mermaid Avenue Vol. II (2000)	Mermaid Avenue: The Complete Sessions (2012)

Mermaid Avenue: The Complete Sessions is a 2012 box set of albums by Billy Bragg & Wilco, all of which feature songs consisting of previously unheard lyrics written by American folk singer-songwriter Woody Guthrie set to newly created music. It was released by Nonesuch Records on Record Store Day to commemorate Guthrie's 100th birthday.

The set contains all of the tracks from the previously released Mermaid Avenue (1998) and Mermaid Avenue Vol. II (2000), as well as a third disc of outtakes from the original album sessions in 1997 and 1998. A DVD containing the documentary Man in the Sand (1999), which is about the "Mermaid Avenue" project, is included as a fourth disc.

== Reception ==
Professional ratings
Aggregate scores
Source	Rating
Metacritic	85/100
Review scores
Source	Rating
AllMusic	4/5 stars
American Songwriter	4.5/5 stars
The A.V. Club	A−
Consequence of Sound	4/5 stars
Drowned in Sound	9/10
The Phoenix	3/4 stars
Pitchfork	8.1/10
PopMatters	9/10
Rolling Stone	4/5 stars
Uncut	7/10

On Metacritic, which assigns a normalized rating out of 100 to reviews from mainstream critics, the set has an average score of 85 based on 12 reviews, which indicates "universal acclaim". The A.V. Club gave it an A−.

== Track listing ==
All lyrics are written by Woody Guthrie, except those of "When the Roses Bloom Again" (see note).

Disc 1: Mermaid Avenue
No.	Title	Music	Length
1.	"Walt Whitman's Niece" (Words: 1946; Music: 1997)	Billy Bragg	3:53
2.	"California Stars" (Music: 1997)	Jay Bennett/Jeff Tweedy	4:57
3.	"Way Over Yonder in the Minor Key" (Words: 1946; Music: 1997)	Bragg	4:06
4.	"Birds and Ships" (Music: 1997)	Bragg	2:13
5.	"Hoodoo Voodoo"	Wilco(Tweedy/Bennett/John Stirratt/Ken Coomer)/Bragg/Corey Harris	3:12
6.	"She Came Along to Me" (Words: 1942; Music: 1998)	Bragg/Tweedy/Bennett	3:26
7.	"At My Window Sad and Lonely" (Words: 1939; Music: 1997)	Tweedy	3:27
8.	"Ingrid Bergman" (Words: 1950; Music: 1996)	Bragg	1:50
9.	"Christ for President" (Music: 1997)	Tweedy/Bennett	2:39
10.	"I Guess I Planted" (Music: 1997)	Bragg	3:32
11.	"One by One" (Words: 1939; Music: 1997)	Tweedy	3:22
12.	"Eisler on the Go" (Music: 1997)	Bragg	2:56
13.	"Hesitating Beauty" (Words: 1949; Music: 1997)	Tweedy	3:04
14.	"Another Man's Done Gone" (Music: 1998)	Bragg	1:34
15.	"The Unwelcome Guest" (Words: 1940; Music: 1996)	Bragg	5:09

Disc 2: Mermaid Avenue Vol. II
No.	Title	Music	Length
1.	"Airline to Heaven" (Words: 1939; Music: 1997)	Jay Bennett/Jeff Tweedy	4:50
2.	"My Flying Saucer" (Words: 1950; Music: 1995)	Billy Bragg	1:45
3.	"Feed of Man" (Music: 1998)	Tweedy	4:08
4.	"Hot Rod Hotel" (Words: 1949; Music: 1996)	Bragg	3:17
5.	"I Was Born" (Words: 1950; Music: 1996)	Bragg	1:50
6.	"Secret of the Sea" (Words: 1939; Music: 1999)	Bennett/Tweedy	2:42
7.	"Stetson Kennedy" (Words: 1950; Music: 1997)	Bragg	2:39
8.	"Remember the Mountain Bed" (Words: 1944; Music: 1999)	Tweedy/Bennett	6:26
9.	"Blood of the Lamb" (Words: 1955; Music: 1997)	Bennett/Tweedy	4:16
10.	"Aginst th' Law" (Words: 1947; Music: 1995)	Bragg	3:03
11.	"All You Fascists" (Words: 1942; Music: 1997)	Bragg	2:43
12.	"Joe DiMaggio Done It Again" (Words: 1949; Music: 1995)	Bragg	2:31
13.	"Meanest Man" (Words: 1945; Music: 1997)	Bragg	3:46
14.	"Black Wind Blowing" (Music: 1997)	Bragg	3:00
15.	"Someday Some Morning Sometime" (Words: 1948; Music: 2000)	Tweedy	2:53

Disc 3: Mermaid Avenue Vol. III
No.	Title	Music	Length
1.	"Bugeye Jim" (Lyrics: 1946)	Billy Bragg	3:18
2.	"When the Roses Bloom Again" (This song was published in 1901 as "I'll Be With You When the Roses Bloom Again", credited to Gus Edwards (composer) and Will D. Cobb (lyricist). The version contained on this album has altered lyrics and a new melody, with only Cobb and Tweedy receiving writing credit.)	Jeff Tweedy	4:11
3.	"Gotta Work" (Lyrics: 1949)	Corey Harris	2:16
4.	"My Thirty Thousand" (Lyrics: 1949)	Bragg	2:40
5.	"Ought to Be Satisfied Now" (Lyrics: 1939)	Bragg	3:34
6.	"Listening to the Wind That Blows" (Lyrics: 1939)	Tweedy	5:07
7.	"Go Down to the Water" (Lyrics: 1945)	Bragg	4:36
8.	"Chain of Broken Hearts" (Lyrics: 1939)	Tweedy	3:31
9.	"Jailcell Blues" (Lyrics: 1953)	Bragg	2:28
10.	"Don't You Marry"	Bragg	3:18
11.	"Give Me a Nail" (Lyrics: 1943)	Bragg	1:42
12.	"The Jolly Banker"	Guthrie	3:31
13.	"Union Prayer" (Lyrics: 1949)	Bragg	4:12
14.	"Be Kind to the Boy on the Road"	Bragg	3:46
15.	"Ain'ta Gonna Grieve"	Tweedy/Jay Bennett	4:52
16.	"Tea Bag Blues"	Harris	4:03
17.	"I'm Out to Get" (Lyrics: 1946)	Bragg	3:58

Disc 4: Man in the Sand (DVD)

== Personnel ==
- Billy Bragg – guitar, vocals
- Jay Bennett – organ, bouzouki, clavinet, piano, drums, background vocals
- Ken Coomer – percussion, drums
- John Stirratt – piano, bass, background vocals
- Jeff Tweedy – guitar, harmonica, vocals

Additional musicians

- Eliza Carthy – violin
- Bob Egan – slide guitar
- Corey Harris – vocals, guitar, lap steel guitar
- Ben Ivitsky – viola
- Natalie Merchant – vocals
- Peter Yanowitz – drums
- Leroy Bach - piano

== See also ==
- Mermaid Avenue (1998)
- Man in the Sand (1999)
- Mermaid Avenue Vol. II (2000)
- Wonder Wheel (2006)
- Woody Guthrie's Happy Joyous Hanukkah (2006)
- The Works (Jonatha Brooke album) (2008)
- New Multitudes (2012)
