= Cara Tivey =

- Instruments: Piano, keyboards
- Years active: 1983–present

Cara Tivey is an English pianist/keyboardist and vocalist who has mainly worked as a side musician. She is best known for her collaborations with Billy Bragg. Tivey is also the cousin of Stephen and Nick Duffy of the Lilac Time.

== Biography ==
Cara Tivey joined Birmingham funk post punk rock band Au Pairs as keyboard player in 1983, followed shortly after by the Fine Young Cannibals. In 1985, Tivey got her first recording break with Everything But the Girl on Baby the Stars Shine Bright.

In 1988, she started working with Billy Bragg on the Workers Playtime album, singing vocals on "Must I Paint You a Picture". She shared the bill with Bragg on the song "She's Leaving Home", which they recorded for the Beatles tribute Sgt. Pepper Knew My Father compilation. The song eventually reached number one on the UK singles chart as part of a double A-side single along with Wet Wet Wet's "With a Little Help from My Friends". During her time with Billy Bragg, Tivey also had the opportunity to accompany Michael Stipe (R.E.M) and Natalie Merchant (10,000 Maniacs) during their 1990 European tour.

Tivey performed on Bragg's 1990 album The Internationale and on 1991's Don't Try This at Home, before he took a five-year break in recording. Also in 1990 and 1991, Tivey contributed to the Lilac Time's & Love for All and Astronauts albums.

During Bragg's hiatus, Tivey contributed to the Music in Colors album by Stephen Duffy in 1993. She also became Blur's live keyboardist during their Modern Life Is Rubbish and Parklife era.

Tivey reunited with Bragg for the final time on his 1996 album, William Bloke.

== Personal life ==
Tivey is married to fellow musician, bassist Micky Harris, and they have two sons.
