= Tooth & Nail (Billy Bragg album) =

2013 studio album by Billy Bragg

Studio album by Billy Bragg
- Released: 18 March 2013
- Studios: The Garfield House Studio, South Pasadena, California
- Genres: Country folk, Americana, alternative rock
- Length: 42:05
- Label: Cooking Vinyl
- Producer: Joe Henry

Billy Bragg chronology
Mermaid Avenue: The Complete Sessions (2012)	Tooth & Nail (2013)	Bridges Not Walls (2017)

Tooth & Nail is a 2013 studio album by folk musician Billy Bragg. It was released on 18 March 2013, in the United Kingdom and on 19 March 2013, in the United States.

== Track listing ==
All tracks are written by Billy Bragg, except where noted.

No.	Title	Length
1.	"January Song"	2:19
2.	"No One Knows Nothing Anymore"	4:31
3.	"Handyman Blues"	3:03
4.	"I Ain't Got No Home" (Woody Guthrie)	3:33
5.	"Swallow My Pride"	2:50
6.	"Do Unto Others"	4:08
7.	"Over You"	3:15
8.	"Goodbye, Goodbye"	3:16
9.	"There Will Be a Reckoning"	3:30
10.	"Chasing Rainbows"	3:39
11.	"Your Name on My Tongue"	4:50
12.	"Tomorrow's Going to Be a Better Day"	3:10
Total length:		42:05

== Personnel ==
- Billy Bragg – acoustic guitar, vocals
- Greg Leisz – acoustic guitar, pedal steel, mandolin
- David Piltch – bass, upright bass
- Patrick Warren – keyboards
- Jay Bellerose – drums, percussion

== Reception ==
Professional ratings
Aggregate scores
Source	Rating
Metacritic	76/100
Review scores
Source	Rating
Allmusic	3.5/5 stars
The A.V. Club	(B−)
Consequence of Sound	3.5/5 stars
The Guardian	4/5 stars
The Australian	5/5 stars
musicOMH	3.5/5 stars

The album received a generally favourable response from reviewers.

== Videos ==
A video was produced for the track "Handyman Blues", directed by Johnny Vegas. Vegas also starred, alongside Bragg, Stewart Lee, Kevin Eldon, Phill Jupitus, Samuel West, Neil Morrissey, Ricky Grover and Ross Noble. The video depicts a group of men gathering in a DIY store to discuss their lack of practical skills and work through their fear of items in the store.
