= Don't Try This at Home (Billy Bragg album) =

1991 studio album by Billy Bragg

Studio album by Billy Bragg
- Released: 16 September 1991
- Recorded: October 1990–July 1991
- Studio: Pavilion Studios, London W10; Cathouse Studios, Streatham; Sonet Studio, London; Clear, Manchester; John Keane Studios, Athens, Georgia; Jester House, Athens, Georgia
- Genre: Alternative rock, folk rock, folk punk
- Length: 56:37
- Label: Elektra (US), Go! Discs (UK), Cooking Vinyl (UK)
- Producer: Grant Showbiz, Johnny Marr

Billy Bragg chronology
The Peel Sessions Album (1991)	Don't Try This at Home (1991)	William Bloke (1996)

Singles from Don't Try This at Home
- 1. "Sexuality" Released: 1 June 1991; 2. "You Woke Up My Neighbourhood" Released: 7 September 1991; 3. "Accident Waiting to Happen (Red Star Version)" Released: 23 February 1992

Don't Try This at Home is the sixth album by urban folk artist Billy Bragg, released on 16 September 1991 by Go! Discs. It reached No. 8 on the UK Albums Chart.

"Sexuality" was released as a single which reached No. 27 on the UK charts and No. 2 on the US Modern Rock charts. Johnny Marr of the Smiths co-wrote "Sexuality" and helped to produce three tracks.

The song "Cindy of a Thousand Lives" is about photographer Cindy Sherman.

"Tank Park Salute" is about his father, Dennis Bragg, who died of lung cancer when Bragg was 18. He said that for a show in Barking, where he grew up, he was so moved by the presence of his mother and brother in the audience that he kept a copy of the lyrics in case he forgot them while performing.

R.E.M.'s Michael Stipe and Peter Buck contribute to "You Woke Up My Neighbourhood". The song was named after a drawing by Woody Guthrie, whose unpublished lyrics were set to music by Bragg and Wilco on the Mermaid Avenue albums a few years later.

"Dolphins" is a cover of the Fred Neil song.

The song "God's Footballer" is about former professional football player Peter Knowles who spent his career at Wolverhampton Wanderers, before voluntarily ending his football career to become a Jehovah's Witness.

== Critical reception ==
Professional ratings
Review scores
Source	Rating
AllMusic	4.5/5 stars
Chicago Tribune	3/4 stars
Entertainment Weekly	A−
NME	9/10
The Philadelphia Inquirer	3.5/4 stars
Q	4/5 stars
Rolling Stone	3/5 stars
The Rolling Stone Album Guide	3.5/5 stars
Select	5/5
Smash Hits	7/10

Don't Try This at Home was released to positive reviews from music critics. Writing for Select, Michele Kirsch found that Bragg had subverted "every pigeonhole he's ever had the misfortune to be bunged into by both the critics and, to some extent, himself". David Quantick of NME praised the record's "imagination" and noted the presence of "many occasions when your actual Bragg sound is radically altered", concluding that Bragg had "shrugged off the demons of despond and made his best album".

== Track listing ==
Adapted from album liner notes.

All tracks written by Billy Bragg except where noted.

1. "Accident Waiting to Happen" – 4:01
2. "Moving the Goalposts" – 2:34
3. "Everywhere" (Greg Trooper, Sid Griffin) – 5:01
4. "Cindy of a Thousand Lives" – 4:15
5. "You Woke Up My Neighbourhood" (Bragg, Peter Buck) – 3:11
6. "Trust" – 4:13
7. "God's Footballer" – 3:04
8. "The Few" – 3:27
9. "Sexuality" (Bragg, Johnny Marr) – 3:49
10. "Mother of the Bride" – 3:36
11. "Tank Park Salute" – 3:30
12. "Dolphins" (Fred Neil) – 4:20
13. "North Sea Bubble" – 3:19
14. "Rumours of War" – 2:50
15. "Wish You Were Her" – 2:46
16. "Body of Water" (Bragg, Philip Wigg aka "Wiggy") – 3:58

Japanese bonus tracks

17. "Bad Penny" (B-side of "Sexuality") – 2:49
18. "Bread and Circuses" (Bragg, Natalie Merchant) (B-side of "You Woke Up My Neighbourhood") – 4:23
19. "Sexuality (London Remix)" (Bragg, Marr) (B-side of "Sexuality") – 6:27

=== Bonus disc track listing ===
Along with a remastered album, a second bonus disc was released by Yep Roc Records (in the US) and Cooking Vinyl (in the UK) in 2006. The new tracks include demos of songs on the album, as well as several other songs, including a cover of the Beatles' "Revolution". Natalie Merchant sings on two tracks.

1. "Party of God" (Bragg, Merchant) (lead vocals by Natalie Merchant) – 4:15
2. "North Sea Bubble" (demo) – 3:30
3. "Sexuality" (demo) (Bragg, Marr) – 3:54
4. "Just One Victory" (alternative mix) (Todd Rundgren) – 5:31
5. "Everywhere" (alternative version) (Trooper, Griffin) – 4:42
6. "Trust" (demo) – 5:43
7. "Bread and Circuses" (Bragg, Merchant) – 4:28
8. "Cindy of a Thousand Lives" (demo) – 3:38
9. "The Few" (demo) – 3:50
10. "Revolution" (John Lennon, Paul McCartney) – 1:51
11. "Tighten Up Your Wig" (with the Athenians and DJ Woody Dee) – 3:18
12. "MBH" – 2:07
13. "This Gulf Between Us" – 2:46
14. "Picadilly Rambler" – 1:49

Bonus disc notes

- Track 1 recorded May 1988 at Fort Apache Studios. B-side of the 10,000 Maniacs single "Trouble Me", 1989.
- Track 2 recorded 16–18 January 1989 at Pavilion Studios. Previously unreleased.
- Track 3 recorded 1989 at Cathouse South. Previously unreleased.
- Track 4 recorded 14 April 1990 at Pavilion Studios. Remixed later and released in 1997 as the B-side of "The Boy Done Good".
- Tracks 5 and 6 recorded 20 August 1990 at Gateway Studios. Previously unreleased.
- Track 7 recorded August 1990 at Fort Apache Studios and produced at Pavilion Studios. B-side of "You Woke Up My Neighbourhood", 1991.
- Tracks 8 and 9 recorded 14 November 1990 at Southfield Road W4. Previously unreleased.
- Track 10 recorded 1 February 1991 at Cathouse South. B-side of "Accident Waiting to Happen (Red Star Version)", 1992.
- Track 11 recorded May 1991 at John Keane's Studio. From the H.E.A.L. (Human Education Against Lies) album Civilisation Vs Technology, 1991.
- Tracks 12–14 recorded 16 July 1993 for the soundtrack of the 1993 BBCTV play Safe. Previously unreleased.

== Personnel ==
Credits adapted from album liner notes.

- Billy Bragg – vocals, acoustic guitar (1–3, 5–8, 10, 11, 14), electric guitar (1, 4, 6, 8, 11–13, 15, 16), keyboards (4)
- Wiggy – electric guitar (1, 5, 8, 11, 13, 15, 16), bass (1, 3, 4, 10, 16), acoustic guitar (4, 10), mandolin (10)
- Cara Tivey – piano (3, 11, 12), keyboards (6, 8, 9, 11, 13, 16), background vocals (4, 12, 16)
- J. F. T. Hood – drums, percussion (1, 4, 5, 8–10, 13, 15, 16)
- Dave Woodhead – flugelhorn (2, 6), trumpet (8)
- Amanda Vincent – keyboards (2, 4, 7, 9, 10, 14, 15), piano (14)
- Danny Thompson – double bass (12, 15)
- Peter Buck – mandolin (3, 5), acoustic guitar (5)
- Jody Linscott – percussion (4, 9, 15)
- John Keane – pedal steel guitar, bass (5)
- Mary Ramsey – viola (6, 14), violin (14)
- Steven Lewis – backing vocals (15)
- Kirsty MacColl – backing vocals (4, 9)
- James Eller – bass (9, 13)
- Julia Palmer – cello (2, 14)
- Andy Hobson – bass (4, 8)
- Caroline Hall – trombone (8)
- Elliet Mackrell – violin (3, 10)
- Lorraine Bowen – background vocals (1, 6, 7, 15)
- Victoria Taylor Roberts – background vocals (15)
- Michael Stipe – background vocals (5)
- Andy Szabo – background vocals (15)

Production

- Grant Showbiz – production (throughout)
- Johnny Marr – production (with Grant Showbiz: 4, 9, 13)
- Victor Van Vugt – engineer (except 13)
- John Keane – engineer (5, with Victor Van Vugt)
- Owen Morris – engineer (9 with Van Vugt; 13), mixing engineer (4)
- Tim Young – mastering
- Caramel Crunch – cover design

Bonus disc

- Billy Bragg – vocals, guitar
- Rob Allum – drums (12)
- Lorraine Bowen – clarinet (6)
- Peter Buck – guitar (11)
- Alan Dunn – accordion (13, 14)
- Nigel Frydman – bass (12)
- The Grief Brothers – producer (10)
- Martin Hayles – engineer (2)
- J. F. T. Hood – drums (4, 10), programming (4), backing vocals (4)
- John Keane – engineer (11)
- Bob Loveday – violin (13, 14)
- Natalie Merchant – vocals (1, 7)
- David Narcizo – drums (1)
- Julia Palmer – cello (7)
- Andy Roberts – mandolin (14), percussion (14), producer (12–14)
- Grant Showbiz – producer (4–7, 10, 11)
- Gary Smith – glockenspiel (1), bass (7), percussion (7), producer (1), engineer (1, 7)
- Kate St John – saxophone (6)
- Mark Stepp – drums (11)
- Danny Thompson – double bass (13)
- Cara Tivey – piano (4–6, 12), organ (4, 12), keyboards (5), backing vocals (4, 12)
- Victor Van Vugt – backing vocals (10), engineer (10), mixing (11)
- Wiggy – bass (1–4, 10), guitar (2, 3, 10, 12), footstomp (2), backing vocals (10), engineer (8, 9)
- Dave Woodhead – trumpet (7)
- DJ Woody Dee – finger pops (11), "heal thyself" (11)
