= Bloke on Bloke =

1997 compilation album by Billy Bragg

Compilation album by Billy Bragg
- Released: 1997
- Genre: Folk rock
- Label: Cooking Vinyl

Billy Bragg chronology
William Bloke (1996)	Bloke on Bloke (1997)	Mermaid Avenue (1998)

Professional ratings
Review scores
Source	Rating
AllMusic	2.5/5 stars
The Encyclopedia of Popular Music	3/5 stars

Bloke on Bloke is a 1997 outtakes compilation album by British rock musician Billy Bragg. It gathers together several outtakes from the sessions for the William Bloke album. Its title is a play on the Bob Dylan album Blonde On Blonde.

The album was reissued on blue and orange vinyl for Record Store Day 2024.

== Track listing ==
All tracks written by Billy Bragg except as noted.

1. "The Boy Done Good" (Bragg, Johnny Marr)
2. "Qualifications" (originally a bonus track on the vinyl edition of William Bloke.)
3. "Sugar Daddy (Smokey Gets in Your Ears Mix)" (remix by Grant Showbiz of the William Bloke track.)
4. "Never Had No One Ever" (Morrissey, Marr) (originally recorded for the Smiths tribute album The Smiths is dead.)
5. "Sugardubby" (remix by Grant Showbiz of the William Bloke track.)
6. "Rule Nor Reason"
7. "Thatcherites" (Bragg, Traditional)
