= Mermaid Avenue Vol. II =

2000 studio album by Billy Bragg and Wilco

Studio album by Billy Bragg and Wilco
- Released: 30 May 2000
- Recorded: Boston, Chicago, and Dublin
- Genre: Folk rock
- Length: 49:47
- Label: Elektra
- Producers: Wilco, Billy Bragg, Grant Showbiz

Billy Bragg chronology
Reaching to the Converted (1999)	Mermaid Avenue Vol. II (2000)	England, Half-English (2001)

Wilco chronology
Summerteeth (1999)	Mermaid Avenue Vol. II (2000)	Yankee Hotel Foxtrot (2002)

Billy Bragg & Wilco chronology
Mermaid Avenue (1998)	Mermaid Avenue Vol. II (2000)	Mermaid Avenue: The Complete Sessions (2012)

Professional ratings
Aggregate scores
Source	Rating
Metacritic	82/100
Review scores
Source	Rating
AllMusic	3/5 stars
Chicago Sun-Times	3.5/4 stars
Christgau's Consumer Guide	A−
Entertainment Weekly	B+
The Guardian	3/5 stars
Pitchfork	6.3/10
Q	4/5 stars
Rolling Stone	4/5 stars
The Rolling Stone Album Guide	3.5/5 stars
Spin	7/10

Mermaid Avenue Vol. II is a 2000 album of previously unheard lyrics written by American folk singer Woody Guthrie, put to music written and performed by British singer Billy Bragg and American band Wilco. It continues the project originally conceived by Guthrie's daughter, Nora Guthrie which resulted in the release of Mermaid Avenue in 1998. Both volumes were collected in a 2012 box set along with volume three as Mermaid Avenue: The Complete Sessions.

Track 9, "Blood of the Lamb", is Woody's overhaul of an 1878 gospel music standard "Are You Washed in the Blood?" written by Elisha A. Hoffman.

Man in the Sand, a documentary about the collaboration between Bragg and Wilco, was released in 1999.

== Track listing ==
All lyrics are written by Woody Guthrie.

No.	Title	Music	Length
1.	"Airline to Heaven" (Words: 1939; Music: 1997)	Jay Bennett/Jeff Tweedy	4:50
2.	"My Flying Saucer" (Words: 1950; Music: 1995)	Billy Bragg	1:45
3.	"Feed of Man" (Music: 1998)	Tweedy	4:08
4.	"Hot Rod Hotel" (Words: 1949; Music: 1996)	Bragg	3:17
5.	"I Was Born" (Words: 1950; Music: 1996)	Bragg	1:50
6.	"Secret of the Sea" (Words: 1939; Music: 1999)	Bennett/Tweedy	2:42
7.	"Stetson Kennedy" (Words: 1950; Music: 1997)	Bragg	2:39
8.	"Remember the Mountain Bed" (Words: 1944; Music: 1999)	Tweedy/Bennett	6:26
9.	"Blood of the Lamb" (Words: 1955; Music: 1997)	Bennett/Tweedy	4:16
10.	"Aginst th' Law" (Words: 1947; Music: 1995)	Bragg	3:03
11.	"All You Fascists" (Words: 1942; Music: 1997)	Bragg	2:43
12.	"Joe DiMaggio Done It Again" (Words: 1949; Music: 1995)	Bragg	2:31
13.	"Meanest Man" (Words: 1945; Music: 1997)	Bragg	3:46
14.	"Black Wind Blowing" (Music: 1997)	Bragg	3:00
15.	"Someday Some Morning Sometime" (Words: 1948; Music: 2000)	Tweedy	2:53

== Personnel ==
- Billy Bragg – vocal, guitar, resonator guitar
- Jay Bennett – guitar, backing vocal, slide guitar, shaker, saw, 12 string guitar, B3 organ, Leslie pedals, Farfisa organ, mandolin, piano, tambourine, electric sitar, soloing, nylon string guitar, banjo, harmonica, drums, upright bass, Delayaphone, bells
- Ken Coomer – drums, tape box, tambourine, percussion, backing vocal, hollering, kick drum, gas heater
- John Stirratt – bass, backing vocal, claps, upright bass, baritone guitar
- Jeff Tweedy – vocal, guitar, clapping, Mellotron, cabasa, 12 string guitar, slide guitar, mandolin, Wurlitzer

Additional musicians

- Mike Henry – backing vocal on "My Flying Saucer"
- Natalie Merchant – guest lead vocal on "I Was Born"
- Leroy Bach – piano on "Remember The Mountain Bed"
- Corey Harris – guest lead vocal and acoustic guitar on "Against Th' Law"
- Eliza Carthy – violin on "Joe DiMaggio Has Done It Again"

== Charts ==
Chart performance for Mermaid Avenue Vol. II
Chart (2000)	Peak position
Australian Albums (ARIA)	45
UK Albums (Official Charts)	61
US Billboard 200	88
Scottish Albums (Official Charts)	64
Canada Top Albums/CDs (RPM)	54

== See also ==
- Woody Guthrie Foundation
- Mermaid Avenue (1998)
- Man in the Sand (1999)
- Wonder Wheel (2006)
- The Works (2008)
- Woody Guthrie's Happy Joyous Hanukkah (2006)
- New Multitudes (2012)
- Mermaid Avenue: The Complete Sessions (2012)
