= Sgt. Pepper Knew My Father =

Compilation album by Various Artists
- Released: 1988
- Length: 44:28
- Label: New Musical Express

Singles from Sgt. Pepper Knew My Father
- 1. "She's Leaving Home" / "With a Little Help from My Friends" Released: 1988

Professional ratings
Review scores
| Source | Rating |
|---|---|
| AllMusic | 3/5 stars |
| Number One | 3/5 stars |

Sgt. Pepper Knew My Father is a 1988 multi-artist compilation LP/cassette of 1980s artists recording new versions of the songs on the Beatles album Sgt. Pepper's Lonely Hearts Club Band. The album was produced by the New Musical Express to raise money for Childline, the charity founded by the BBC1 consumer programme That's Life! It was also intended to celebrate the 21st anniversary of the original release of Sgt. Pepper's Lonely Hearts Club Band on 1 June 1967. Apart from separate tracks on some artists' own re-releases/compilations, the only release it ever saw on compact disc was a promotional recording.

The title is a pun on the song "Lloyd George Knew My Father".

A single released to help promote the album, a double-A side of "With a Little Help from My Friends" by Wet Wet Wet and "She's Leaving Home" by Billy Bragg with Cara Tivey, reached number one on the UK Singles Chart.

== Track listing ==
The track listing of the album was identical to that of the Beatles' original release, though the gibberish known as the "Sgt. Pepper Inner Groove" appears as part of Frank Sidebottom's appearance at the end of side one (performed by Little Frank, but cut off by Frank chiding him for doing it on the wrong side), as well as the end of side two, which is the original one running backwards.

All tracks are written by Lennon–McCartney except "Within You Without You", which was written by George Harrison

Side one
| No. | Title | Artist | Length |
|---|---|---|---|
| 1. | "Sgt. Pepper's Lonely Hearts Club Band" | The Three Wize Men | 3:22 |
| 2. | "With a Little Help from My Friends" | Wet Wet Wet | 2:38 |
| 3. | "Lucy in the Sky with Diamonds" | The Christians | 5:26 |
| 4. | "Getting Better" | The Wedding Present with Amelia Fletcher | 1:58 |
| 5. | "Fixing a Hole" | Hue & Cry | 4:06 |
| 6. | "She's Leaving Home" | Billy Bragg with Cara Tivey | 2:51 |
| 7. | "Being for the Benefit of Mr. Kite!" | Frank Sidebottom | 3:07 |

Side two
| No. | Title | Artist | Length |
|---|---|---|---|
| 1. | "Within You Without You" | Sonic Youth | 5:03 |
| 2. | "When I'm Sixty-Four" | Courtney Pine Quartet | 4:10 |
| 3. | "Lovely Rita" | Michelle Shocked | 2:25 |
| 4. | "Good Morning Good Morning" | The Triffids | 2:46 |
| 5. | "Sgt. Pepper's Lonely Hearts Club Band (Reprise)" | The Three Wize Men | 2:40 |
| 6. | "A Day in the Life" | The Fall | 3:56 |

== See also ==
- Ruby Trax - The NME's Roaring Forty
