= The Internationale (album) =

1990 studio album by Billy Bragg

Studio album by Billy Bragg
- Released: 30 April 1990
- Recorded: January–March 1990
- Studio: Gateway Studios, London; Cathouse Studios, Streatham; Pier House Studios, Edinburgh
- Genre: Folk
- Length: 19:23
- Label: Liberation Records, Utility Records
- Producer: Grant Showbiz, Wiggy

Billy Bragg chronology
| Workers Playtime (1988) | The Internationale (1990) | The Peel Sessions Album (1991) |

Professional ratings
Review scores
| Source | Rating |
|---|---|
| AllMusic | 3.5/5 stars |
| Christgau's Consumer Guide | (dud) |
| Entertainment Weekly | A− |
| New Musical Express | 6/10 |
| Orlando Sentinel | 3/5 stars |
| (The New) Rolling Stone Album Guide | 3.5/5 stars |

The Internationale is a 1990 album by Billy Bragg. Originally released on Bragg's short-lived record label, Utility Records, it is a deliberately political album, consisting mainly of cover versions and rewrites of left-wing protest songs. Although Bragg is known for his association with left-wing causes, this release is unusual; most of Bragg's recordings balance overtly political songs with social observation and love songs.

The album peaked at number 34 on the UK Albums Chart in May 1990.

== Versions ==
The album was originally released as a seven-track EP in 1990.

In 2006, as part of a planned series of reissues of albums in his back catalogue, The Internationale was remastered and reissued along with the seven tracks from 1988's Live & Dubious EP and five bonus tracks. Also included is a bonus DVD titled Here and There containing live concerts from East Berlin, Nicaragua and the Soviet Union.

== Track listing ==
Original album

1. "The Internationale" (Pierre De Geyter, Billy Bragg) – 3:45
2. "I Dreamed I Saw Phil Ochs Last Night" (Earl Robinson, Bragg) – 1:27
3. "The Marching Song of the Covert Battalions" (Bragg) – 3:59
4. "Blake's Jerusalem" (William Blake, Hubert Parry) – 2:30
5. "Nicaragua Nicaraguita" (Carlos Mejía Godoy) – 1:06
6. "The Red Flag" (Jim Connell, traditional) – 3:12
7. "My Youngest Son Came Home Today" (Eric Bogle) – 3:04

=== 2006 reissue bonus tracks ===
Live and Dubious EP

8. "Introduction" (live) – 0:57
9. "Help Save the Youth of America" (live) (Bragg) – 2:36
10. "Think Again" (live) (Dick Gaughan) – 4:21
11. "Chile Your Waters Run Red Through Soweto" (live) (Bernice Johnson Reagon) – 3:09
12. "Days Like These" (DC remix) (Bragg) – 2:40
13. "To Have and to Have Not" (live) (Bragg) – 2:47
14. "There Is Power in a Union" (with The Pattersons) (Bragg, George F. Root, traditional) – 3:27

Bonus tracks

15. "Joe Hill" (Phil Ochs) (from Don't Mourn – Organize! Songs of Labor Songwriter Joe Hill, 1990) – 8:23
16. "This Land Is Your Land" (with Heathens All) (Woody Guthrie) (from The Disagreement of the People, 1995) – 4:35
17. "Never Cross a Picket Line" (Bragg) (from Rock the Dock, 1998) – 3:38
18. "A Change Is Gonna Come" (Sam Cooke) (previously unreleased) – 3:58
19. "A Miner's Life" (traditional) (previously unreleased) – 3:01

Notes

- Tracks 8–14 recorded and compiled at Pavilion Studios, London.
- Tracks 15, 18 and 19 recorded during The Internationale sessions.
- Track 17 produced at Cathouse Studios.

=== Bonus DVD – Here and There ===
East Berlin DDR – February 1986

1. "There Is Power in a Union" (live) (Bragg, Root, traditional) – 2:35
2. "Between the Wars" (live) (Bragg) – 2:31

Nicaragua – July 1987

3. "Nicaragua Nicaraguita" (live) (Godoy) – 1:07

Lithuania USSR – May 1988

4. "I Heard It Through the Grapevine" (live) (Norman Whitfield, Barrett Strong) – 2:07
5. "To Have and to Have Not" (live) (Bragg) – 2:21
6. "The Milkman of Human Kindness" (live) (Bragg) – 2:29
7. "Island of No Return" (live) (Bragg) – 3:24
8. "Introduction to Between the Wars" (live) – 3:15
9. "Between the Wars" (live) (Bragg) – 2:21
10. "The World Turned Upside Down" (live) (Leon Rosselson) – 3:02
11. "Levi Stubbs' Tears" (live) (Bragg) – 3:15
12. "Help Save the Youth of America" (live) (Bragg) – 2:36
13. "A New England" (Bragg) – 2:04
14. "Wishing the Days Away" (Bragg) – 4:15
15. "People Get Ready" (Curtis Mayfield) / "Tupelo Honey" (Van Morrison) – 3:02
16. "Star" (David Bowie) – 1:56
17. "A13, Trunk Road to The Sea" (Bobby Troup) – 2:17

== Personnel ==
=== Musicians ===
- Billy Bragg – acoustic guitar, electric guitar, vocals
- Cara Tivey – piano, vocals, shakuhachi
- Lorraine Bowen – clarinet, soprano recorder, piano, accordion, organ
- The Christie Tyler Cory Band – brass
- Côr Cochion Caerdydd – vocals
- Marc Duff – whistles
- Jim Sutherland – bodhran, percussion
- Dick Gaughan – vocals
- Wiggy – bass guitar, vocals
- Charlie Llewellin – drum, cymbal
- Grant Showbiz – vocals
- David Bedford – arrangement and conducting

=== Production ===
- Grant Showbiz – producer (1–7, 17), reissue producer, reissue compilation
- Wiggy – producer (1–7), DVD compilation
- Charlie Llewellin – engineer
- Derek Bolland – engineer (1–7)
- Peter Haigh – engineer (1–7)
- Step Parikian – engineer (1–7)
- Committee – design
- Kenny Jones – producer, engineer, compilation (8–14)
- Tim Young – remastering (tracks 1–14)
- Duncan Cowell – remastering (tracks 15–19)
