= Mermaid Avenue =

1998 studio album by Billy Bragg and Wilco

Studio album by Billy Bragg and Wilco
- Released: June 23, 1998
- Studios: Totally Wired, Dublin; Windmill Lane, Dublin; King Size Sound Laboratories, Chicago; Fort Apache, Boston
- Genres: Alt-country; folk rock
- Length: 49:20
- Label: Elektra
- Producers: Wilco, Billy Bragg, Grant Showbiz

Billy Bragg chronology
Bloke on Bloke (1997)	Mermaid Avenue (1998)	Reaching to the Converted (1999)

Wilco chronology
Being There (1996)	Mermaid Avenue (1998)	Summerteeth (1999)

Billy Bragg & Wilco chronology
Mermaid Avenue (1998)	Mermaid Avenue Vol. II (2000)

Professional ratings
Review scores
Source	Rating
AllMusic	4/5 stars
Chicago Sun-Times	3.5/4 stars
Entertainment Weekly	B+
The Guardian	3/5 stars
Los Angeles Times	3.5/4 stars
Pitchfork	7.8/10
Rolling Stone	4/5 stars
The Rolling Stone Album Guide	4.5/5 stars
Spin	8/10
The Village Voice	A

Mermaid Avenue is a 1998 album of previously unheard lyrics written by American folk singer Woody Guthrie, put to music written and performed by British singer Billy Bragg and the American band Wilco. The project was the first of several such projects organized by Guthrie's daughter, Nora Guthrie, original director of the Woody Guthrie Foundation and archives. Mermaid Avenue was released on the Elektra Records label on June 23, 1998. A second volume of recordings, Mermaid Avenue Vol. II, followed in 2000 and both were collected in a box set alongside volume three in 2012 as Mermaid Avenue: The Complete Sessions. The projects are named after the song "Mermaid's Avenue", written by Guthrie. This was also the name of the street in Coney Island, New York, on which Guthrie lived. According to American Songwriter magazine, "The Mermaid Avenue project is essential for showing that Woody Guthrie could illuminate what was going on inside of him as well as he could detail the plight of his fellow man". It was voted number 939 in Colin Larkin's All Time Top 1000 Albums, 3rd Edition (2000).

== Recording ==
During the spring of 1995, Woody Guthrie's daughter Nora contacted English singer-songwriter Billy Bragg about writing music for a selection of completed Guthrie lyrics after Bragg played a Guthrie tribute concert in New York City's Central Park. Her father had left behind over a thousand sets of complete lyrics written between 1939 and 1967; as they had not been recorded by Guthrie, and he did not write music, none of these lyrics had any music other than a vague stylistic notation.

Nora Guthrie's liner notes in Mermaid Avenue indicate that it was her intention that the songs be given to a new generation of musicians who would be able to make the songs relevant to a younger generation. Nora Guthrie contacted Bragg, who in turn approached Wilco and asked them to participate in the project as well. Wilco agreed, and in addition to recording with Bragg in Ireland, they were given their own share of songs to finish.

Rather than recreating tunes in Guthrie's style, Bragg and Wilco created new, contemporary music for the lyrics. Released in 1998 as Mermaid Avenue, the results were met with critical success. The album received a Grammy nomination for Best Contemporary Folk Album, and went on to place fourth on the Pazz & Jop Critics Poll for 1998.

Since the release of the Mermaid Avenue albums, several other musicians have released recordings that similarly have drawn upon unpublished Guthrie material.

Man in the Sand, a documentary about the collaboration between Billy Bragg and Wilco, was released in 1999. A DVD of the film is included in Mermaid Avenue: The Complete Sessions.

Bob Dylan tells in his autobiography that Woody Guthrie asked him to reach out to Guthrie's wife Margie and get the boxes of songs and poems that had been written but never set to melodies. Dylan made his way to Guthrie's place but Margie was not there, only Guthrie's son Arlo and the babysitter. Neither had any idea about the box, and Dylan headed back to New York. Dylan writes in his autobiography Chronicles: "Forty years later, these lyrics would fall into the hands of Billy Bragg and the group Wilco and they would put melodies to them, bring them to full life and record them. It was all done under the direction of Woody's daughter Nora. These performers probably weren't even born when I had made that trip to Brooklyn."

== Live performances ==
In 2026, Wilco, Bragg and Natalie Merchant played songs from the album at Wilco's Solid Sound festival live for the first time.

== Track listing ==
All lyrics are written by Woody Guthrie.

Mermaid Avenue track listing
No.	Title	Music	Length
1.	"Walt Whitman's Niece" (Words: 1946; Music: 1997)	Billy Bragg	3:53
2.	"California Stars" (Music: 1997)	Jay Bennett/Jeff Tweedy	4:57
3.	"Way Over Yonder in the Minor Key" (Words: 1946; Music: 1997)	Bragg	4:06
4.	"Birds and Ships" (Music: 1997)	Bragg	2:13
5.	"Hoodoo Voodoo"	Wilco (Tweedy/Bennett/John Stirratt/Ken Coomer)/Bragg/Corey Harris	3:12
6.	"She Came Along to Me" (Words: 1942; Music: 1998)	Bragg/Tweedy/Bennett	3:26
7.	"At My Window Sad and Lonely" (Words: 1939; Music: 1997)	Tweedy	3:27
8.	"Ingrid Bergman" (Words: 1950; Music: 1996)	Bragg	1:50
9.	"Christ for President" (Music: 1997)	Tweedy/Bennett	2:39
10.	"I Guess I Planted" (Music: 1997)	Bragg	3:32
11.	"One by One" (Words: 1939; Music: 1997)	Tweedy	3:22
12.	"Eisler on the Go" (Music: 1997)	Bragg	2:56
13.	"Hesitating Beauty" (Words: 1949; Music: 1997)	Tweedy	3:04
14.	"Another Man's Done Gone" (Music: 1998)	Bragg	1:34
15.	"The Unwelcome Guest" (Words: 1940; Music: 1996)	Bragg	5:09

== Personnel ==
- Billy Bragg – lead vocals (1, 3, 6, 8, 10, 12, 15), acoustic guitar (1, 2, 3, 4, 8, 10, 15), electric guitar (5, 13), bouzouki (7), backing vocals (7), National guitar (9, 12), handclaps (10), banjo (12)
- Jeff Tweedy – lead vocals (2, 5, 7, 9, 11, 13, 14), electric guitar (1, 10), harmonica (1, 6, 15), backing vocals (1, 10), acoustic guitar (2, 6, 7, 9, 11, 15), handclaps (10)
- Jay Bennett – piano (1, 2, 9, 10, 11, 12, 13), clavinet (1, 9), Farfisa organ (1), drums (1), backing vocals (1, 2, 6, 7, 10, 13), Hammond B-3 organ (3, 5, 7, 10, 11), bouzouki (3), Farfisa bass pedals (5), electric bass (6), acoustic guitar (6), slide guitar (6), dulcimer (7), banjo (9), melodica (12, 15), handclaps (10), percussion (12), electric guitar (13), grand piano (14, 15)
- John Stirratt – acoustic bass (1, 9), backing vocals (1, 2, 7, 10), electric bass (2, 3, 5, 6, 7, 10, 11, 13, 15), bass piano (5), acoustic guitar (6), Hammond B-3 organ (6), bass pedals (9), handclaps (10)
- Ken Coomer – drums (1, 2, 3, 5, 6, 7, 9, 10, 11, 13, 15), percussion (1, 2, 3, 9, 12), handclaps (10), backing vocals (1, 10)

Additional musicians

- Johnathan "JP" Parker – backing vocals (1)
- Eliza Carthy – violin (2, 3)
- Corey Harris – lap steel guitar (2), electric guitar (5), backing vocals (10), handclaps (10)
- Peter Yanowitz – chorus drums (3)
- Elizabeth Steen – accordion (3)
- Natalie Merchant – backing vocals (3), lead vocals (4)
- Bob Egan – slide guitar (6), pedal steel (11, 15)

== Charts ==
Chart performance for Mermaid Avenue
Chart (1998–1999)	Peak position
Australian Albums (ARIA)	12
UK Albums (Official Charts)	34
US Billboard 200	90
Scottish Albums (Official Charts)	67

== Certifications ==
Certifications for Mermaid Avenue
Region	Certification	Certified units/sales
Australia (ARIA)	Gold	35,000^{^}
United Kingdom (BPI)	Silver	60,000^{*}
^{*} Sales figures based on certification alone.^{^} Shipments figures based on certification alone.

== See also ==
- Woody Guthrie Foundation
- Man in the Sand (1999)
- Mermaid Avenue Vol. II (2000)
- Wonder Wheel (2006)
- Woody Guthrie's Happy Joyous Hanukkah (2006)
- The Works (2008)
- New Multitudes (2012)
- Mermaid Avenue: The Complete Sessions (2012)
