= The Pattersons =

Irish folk band

The Pattersons were an Irish folk band from County Donegal in Ulster during the 1960s and 1970s. Originally consisting of Billy, Ronnie, Christine and Dorothy, they became a trio in 1969 when Dorothy left. The group released 5 LPs and achieved international recognition in the 1970s. They are remembered for their 13 appearances on the Morecambe & Wise show.

== Personal details ==
Ronnie Patterson married Rhona Duffy and produced two daughters, Stephanie and Gillian. He retired from RTÉ and now lives near Ramelton in the north of County Donegal.

Christine Patterson married Dr. Michael O'Dowd and they have four children, Katy, Clare, Michael and David. They reside in Bearna in Connemara, County Galway, in the West of Ireland.

Billy Patterson married Carmel Gallagher and had three children, Aran, Iona and Adam. They now live in Manorcunningham, a village in The Laggan district in the east of County Donegal. Billy also has three daughters by his first marriage to Jane. These daughters are Kiera, Jacqueline and Lizzie.

Dorothy Patterson married Bill Orr and they have three children, Tory, Ailsa and Christopher. They lived near Dungloe in The Rosses in the west of County Donegal. Dorothy died in 2009.
