= England, Half-English =

2002 studio album by Billy Bragg and the Blokes

Studio album by Billy Bragg and the Blokes
- Released: 4 March 2002
- Recorded: June 2001
- Studios: Monnow Valley Studio, Rockfield, Wales; Street Level, London; Roundhouse Studios, London
- Length: 42:58
- Labels: Cooking Vinyl (Europe); Elektra (US)
- Producer: Grant Showbiz

Billy Bragg and the Blokes chronology
Mermaid Avenue Vol. II (2000)	England, Half-English (2002)	Must I Paint You a Picture? The Essential Billy Bragg (2003)

Singles from England, Half-English
- 1. "England, Half English" / "St. Monday" Released: 18 February 2002; 2. "Take Down the Union Jack" Released: 20 May 2002

Professional ratings
Aggregate scores
Source	Rating
Metacritic	(64/100)
Review scores
Source	Rating
AllMusic	2.5/5 stars
The Austin Chronicle	3.5/5 stars
Entertainment Weekly	B−
Los Angeles Times	3/4 stars
Neumu.net	3/10 stars
NME	(5/10)
Playlouder	4/5 stars
Robert Christgau	(choice cut)
Rolling Stone	2.5/5 stars
Spin	(7/10)
Stylus Magazine	F
Uncut	4/5 stars
Yahoo! Music UK	3/10 stars

England, Half-English is a 2002 album by English political singer-songwriter Billy Bragg and the Blokes.

The title track is about racism in England and the anti-immigration feelings and racist abuse of asylum seekers fuelled by the tabloid press, particularly the Daily Mail. The song uses examples such as the lions on the English football team's shirts, Britannia and the English patron saint, St. George (from Lebanon), the hyphen in Anglo-Saxon and the nation's favourite dish (curry) to convey his message that everything about English culture is shaped and influenced by the waves of immigration that have taken place in the past.

The title is taken from England, Half English, a 1961 collection of essays and articles by Colin MacInnes, which includes a 1957 article called "Young England, Half English" about the influence of American pop music on English teenagers.

The album peaked at number 51 on the UK Albums Chart in March 2002. Its first single, the double A-side "England, Half English" / "St. Monday", reached number 98 on the UK singles chart the same month. "Take Down the Union Jack", a song from the album that protests against the monarchy, Queen Elizabeth's Golden Jubilee and argues for English and Scottish independence, reached number 22 in the UK Singles Chart in May 2002.

== Track listing ==
Adapted from album liner notes.

All tracks composed by Billy Bragg; except where indicated

1. "St. Monday" – 3:04
2. "Jane Allen" (Martyn Barker, Bragg, Lu Edmonds, Ben Mandelson, Ian McLagan) – 3:58
3. "Distant Shore" (Barker, Bragg, Edmonds, Mandelson, McLagan) – 2:30
4. "England, Half English" (Barker, Bragg, Edmonds, Mandelson, McLagan) – 2:29
5. "NPWA (No Power Without Accountability)" (Barker, Bragg, Edmonds, Mandelson, McLagan) – 5:31
6. "Some Days I See the Point" (Barker, Bragg, Edmonds, Mandelson, McLagan) – 4:59
7. "Baby Faroukh" (Barker, Bragg, Edmonds, Mandelson, McLagan) – 3:06
8. "Take Down the Union Jack" – 3:20
9. "Another Kind of Judy" – 3:44
10. "He'll Go Down" – 3:21
11. "Dreadbelly" (Barker, Bragg, Edmonds, Mandelson, McLagan) – 3:33
12. "Tears of My Tracks" – 3:53

Australian CD bonus track

13. "Yarra Song" – 3:33

Japanese CD bonus tracks

13. "You Pulled the Carpet Out" – 2:38
14. "Mystery Shoes" – 3:09

2006 CD reissue bonus disc

1. "Billericay Dickie" (Ian Dury, Steve Nugent) (from Brand New Boots and Panties, 2001) – 4:46
2. "Mansion on the Hill" (Bruce Springsteen) (from Light of Day – A Tribute to Bruce Springsteen, 2003) – 4:20
3. "Glad and Sorry" (Ronnie Lane) (previously unreleased) – 4:08
4. "He'll Go Down" (demo) (previously unreleased) – 3:31
5. "Yarra Song" (B-side of "Take Down the Union Jack") – 3:33
6. "You Pulled the Carpet Out" (B-side of "Take Down the Union Jack") – 2:38
7. "Mystery Shoes" (B-side of "Take Down the Union Jack") – 3:09
8. "Tears of my Tracks" (demo) (previously unreleased) – 3:20
9. "Take Down the Union Jack" (band version) (B-side of "Take Down the Union Jack") – 3:22
10. "England, Half English" (7" remix) (Barker, Bragg, Edmonds, Mandelson, McLagan) (B-side of "Take Down the Union Jack") – 3:56
11. "1 2 3 4" (Woody Guthrie) (from Daddy-O Daddy! Rare Family Songs of Woody Guthrie, 2001) – 2:05
12. "Dry Bed" (band version) (Guthrie) (from Daddy-O Daddy! Rare Family Songs of Woody Guthrie) – 3:19
13. "Danny Rose" (Lal Waterson, Mike Waterson) (from Shining Bright – The Songs of Lal and Mike Waterson, 2002) – 2:27
14. "She Smiled Sweetly" (Mick Jagger, Keith Richards) (from various artists compilation accompanying Uncut magazine, March 2002) – 2:50

Bonus disc notes

- Tracks 1–4 recorded November 1999 at Real World Studios.
- Tracks 5–9, 11–13 recorded June 2001 at Monnow Valley Studio.
- Track 10 recorded 22 February 2002 at Cathouse Studios.
- Track 14 recorded 2002 at Roundhouse Studio.

== Personnel ==
Credits adapted from album liner notes.

- Billy Bragg – guitar, vocals

The Blokes

- Ben Mandelson – various string instruments
- Ian McLagan – Hammond organ, piano, backing vocals
- Lu Edmonds – various string instruments, backing vocals
- Martyn Barker – drums, percussion, backing vocals
- Simon Edwards – bass guitar

Additional musicians

- Terry Edwards – tenor saxophone (4, 11)
- Caroline Hall – trombone (4, 11)
- Dave Woodhead – trumpet (4, 11), flugelhorn (12), brass arrangements
- Lorraine Bowen – backing vocals (1, 12)
- Anthea Clarke – backing vocals (5)
- Love Ayikai Tagoe – backing vocals (7)
- Rebecca Naadu Laryea – backing vocals (7)

Technical

- Grant Showbiz – producer
- Mike Boddy – engineer
- Jeremy Gill – assistant engineer, digital editing
- Bob Ludwig – mastering
