= Workers Playtime (album) =

1988 studio album by Billy Bragg

Studio album by Billy Bragg
- Released: September 20, 1988
- Studio: Pavilion Studios, London W10
- Genre: Folk punk
- Length: 42:22
- Label: Elektra, Go! Discs
- Producer: Joe Boyd, Wiggy

Billy Bragg chronology
Talking with the Taxman About Poetry (1986)	Workers Playtime (1988)	The Internationale (1990)

Singles from Workers Playtime
- 1. "Waiting for the Great Leap Forwards" Released: 1988; 2. "She's Got a New Spell" Released: 1988

Professional ratings
Review scores
Source	Rating
AllMusic	3.5/5 stars
Robert Christgau	B
Record Mirror	3/5 stars
Rolling Stone	4/5 stars

Workers Playtime is a 1988 album by Billy Bragg. Originally released on the Go! Discs label, it is his fourth release but third full-length album. It was reissued on compact disc in September 1996 on the Cooking Vinyl label before being remastered, expanded and reissued in 2006 on Cooking Vinyl in the UK and on the Yep Roc label in the United States.

The album reached number 18 in the UK albums chart.

It was voted number 499 in the third edition of Colin Larkin's All Time Top 1000 Albums (2000).

The original album cover has the subtitle "Capitalism Is Killing Music", referring to the British Phonographic Industry's then-current campaign that "Home Taping Is Killing Music".

The album originally had a region- and format-specific price printed on the artwork, signifying the maximum price the album should be sold for (as "Pay no more than"), similar to Bragg's previous albums. For example, in the UK, no more than £4.99 should have been paid for the LP or cassette and £7.99 for the compact disc. Other prices included $15.99 for the LP or cassette in the US and AUD$23.99 for the Compact Disc in Australia. This particular aspect of the album was referenced in the TV series John Safran's Music Jamboree. The prices were removed on subsequent re-releases.

== Track listing ==
All tracks written by Billy Bragg except where noted.

Disc one

1. "She's Got a New Spell" – 3:26
2. "Must I Paint You a Picture?" – 5:32
3. "Tender Comrade" – 2:50
4. "The Price I Pay" – 3:34
5. "Little Time Bomb" – 2:17
6. "Rotting on Remand" – 3:37
7. "Valentine's Day is Over" – 4:53
8. "Life With the Lions" – 3:06
9. "The Only One" – 3:26
10. "The Short Answer" – 4:59
11. "Waiting for the Great Leap Forwards" – 4:35

Disc two (2006 reissue)

1. "The Only One" (demo version) – 3:36
2. "The Price I Pay" (demo version) – 4:01
3. "Love Has No Pride" (Eric Kaz, Libby Titus) – 3:35
4. "That's Entertainment" (Paul Weller) – 3:53
5. "She's Got a New Spell" (demo version) – 2:44
6. "The Short Answer" (demo version) – 5:21
7. "Little Time Bomb" (demo version) – 2:21
8. "Bad Penny" (demo version) – 3:05
9. "Reason to Believe" (live) (Tim Hardin) – 2:12
10. "Must I Paint You a Picture?" (extended version) – 7:13
11. "Raglan Road" (live) (Patrick Kavanagh, traditional) – 3:46

== Personnel ==
=== Musicians ===
- Billy Bragg – vocals, acoustic guitar, electric guitar, triangle
- Danny Thompson – double bass
- Cara Tivey – piano, vocals, Hammond C-3 organ
- Micky Waller – drums
- Wiggy – electric guitar, acoustic guitar, 12 string guitar, slide guitar, backing vocals
- Tony Maronie – percussion
- Bruce Thomas – bass guitar
- Dave Woodhead – trumpets, flugelhorn
- B. J. Cole – pedal steel guitar
- Martin Belmont – electric guitar
- Barb Jungr – harmonica
- Julia Palmer – cello
- Camilla Brunt – violin
- Kenny Jones – 6 and 12 string acoustic guitar
- Theresa Pamplin – viola
- Donna Welchman – violin
- Porky – backing vocals
- Jayne Creamer – backing vocals
- Kaya Jenner – backing vocals
- Michelle Shocked – backing vocals

=== Production ===
- Joe Boyd – producer
- Wiggy – producer
- Martin Hayles – engineer
- Graham Dear – assistant engineer
- Lawrence Watson – photography
- Liu Chich-Kuei – artwork
- Thumbnail – design
