= Billy Bragg =

British singer, songwriter and musician (born 1957)

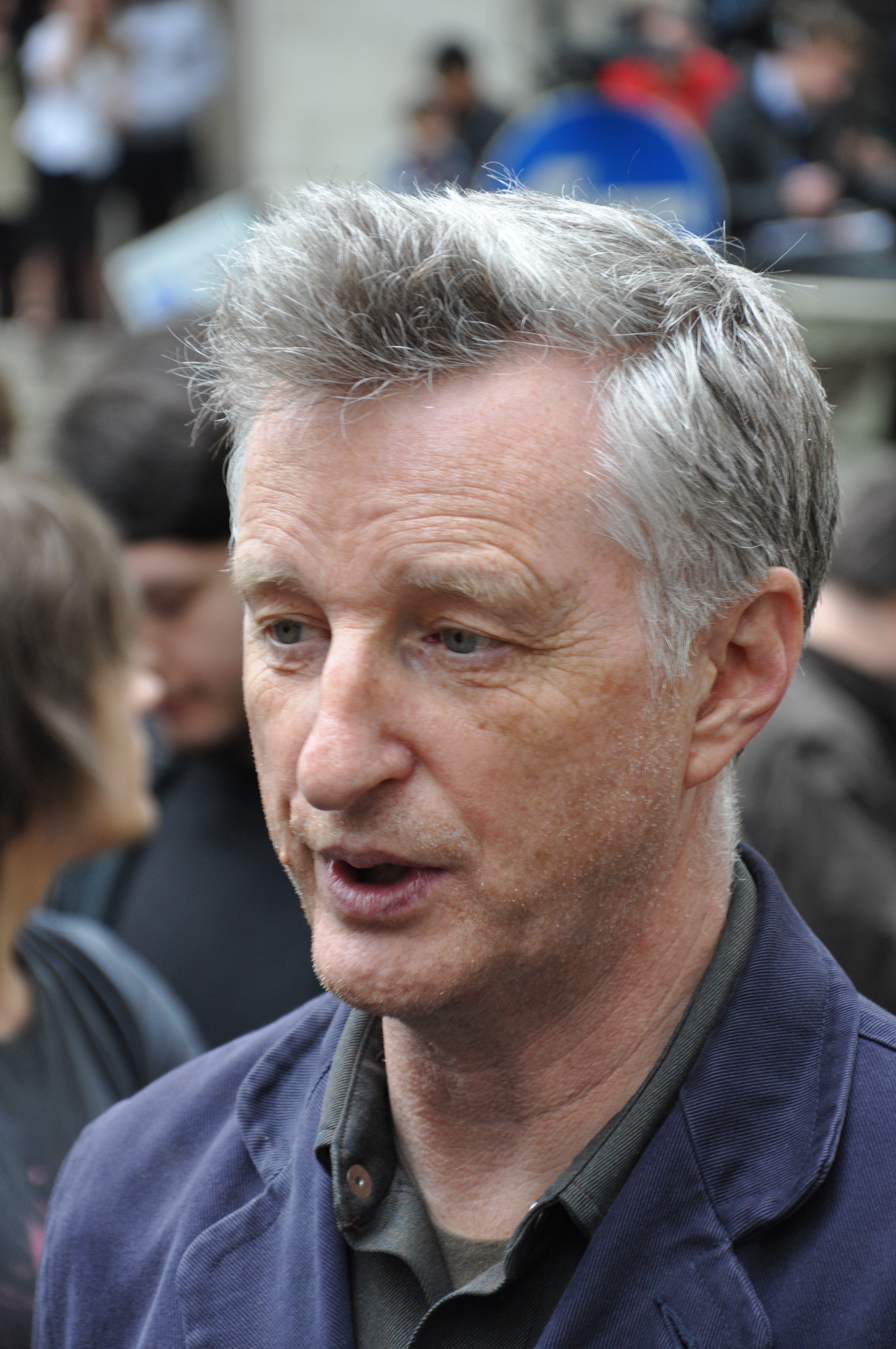
- Bragg in 2010

Background information
- Also known as: William Bragg
- Born: Stephen William Bragg; 20 December 1957 (age 68); Barking, Essex, England
- Genres: Folk punk; folk rock; indie folk; alternative rock; Americana; alternative country; country folk
- Occupations: Singer; songwriter; musician; author; political activist
- Instruments: Vocals; guitar; bass guitar
- Works: Billy Bragg discography
- Years active: 1977–present
- Labels: Charisma; Go! Discs; Elektra; Cooking Vinyl; Dine Alone
- Website: billybragg.co.uk
- Billy Bragg's voice Recorded October 2012 from the BBC Radio 4 programme Mastertapes

Stephen William Bragg (born 20 December 1957) is an English singer, songwriter, musician, author and political activist. His music blends elements of folk music, punk rock and protest songs, with lyrics that mostly span political or romantic themes. His activism is centred on social change and left-wing political causes.

== Early life ==
Bragg was born in 1957 in Barking, Essex, to Dennis Frederick Austin Bragg, an assistant sales manager to a Barking cap maker and milliner, and his wife Marie Victoria D'Urso, who was of Italian descent through her father. (Note: Marie was the daughter of Daisy Simmonds and Anielli D'Urso, the son of Alfonso D'Urso an ice-cream vendor living in Holborn. Alfonso's wife, Trofimena Giudotti, was the daughter of Luigi Giudotti, who also sold ice cream. They wed at St Peter's Italian Church in 1906.) Bragg's father died of lung cancer in 1976, and his mother died in 2011.

Bragg was educated at Northbury Junior School and Park Modern Secondary School (now part of Barking Abbey Secondary School) in Barking. He failed his eleven-plus exam. He developed an interest in poetry at age twelve, when his English teacher chose him to read a poem he had written for a homework assignment on a local radio station. He focused on learning and practising the guitar with his next-door neighbour, Philip Wigg (Wiggy). Some of their influences were the Faces, Small Faces and the Rolling Stones. He was also exposed to folk and folk-rock music during his teenage years, citing Simon & Garfunkel and Bob Dylan as early influences on his songwriting.

During the rise of punk rock and new wave in the late 1970s, Elvis Costello also served as an inspiration for Bragg. He was particularly influenced by the Jam, as well as the Clash, whom he had seen play live in London in May 1977 on their White Riot Tour, and again at a Rock Against Racism carnival in April 1978, which he admits was the first time he really stepped into the world of music as it is used for political activism. The experience of the gig and preceding march helped shape Bragg's left-wing politics, a change from his having previously "turned a blind eye" to casual racism.

== Career ==
=== Early career ===
In 1977, Bragg formed the punk rock/pub rock band Riff Raff with Wiggy. The band decamped to rural Oundle in Northamptonshire in 1978 to record a series of singles (the first on independent Chiswick Records), which did not receive wide exposure. After a period of gigging in Northamptonshire and London, they returned to Barking and split in 1980. Taking a series of odd jobs including working at Guy Norris' record shop in Barking high street, Bragg became disillusioned with his stalled music career and in May 1981 joined the British Army as a recruit destined for the Queen's Royal Irish Hussars of the Royal Armoured Corps. After completing three months' basic training, he bought himself out for £175 and returned home.

Bragg peroxided his hair to mark a new phase in his life and began performing frequent concerts and busking around London, playing solo with an electric guitar under the name Spy vs Spy (after the strip in Mad magazine).

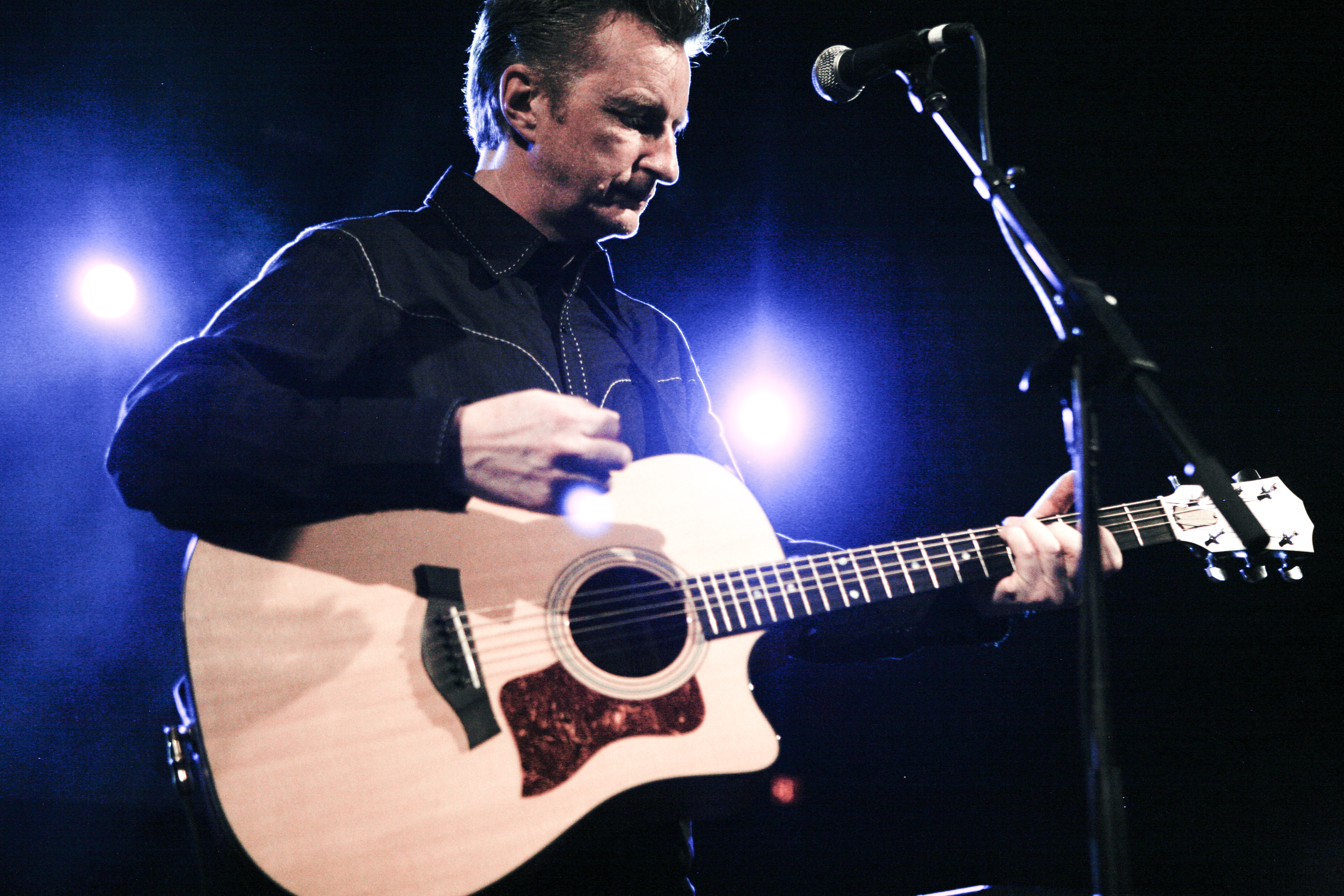
Bragg performing at South by Southwest in 2008

His demo tape initially got no response from the record industry, but by pretending to be a television repair man, he got into the office of Charisma Records' A&R man Peter Jenner. Jenner liked the tape, but the company was near bankruptcy and had no budget to sign new artists. Bragg got an offer to record more demos for music publisher Chappell & Co., so Jenner agreed to release them as a record. Life's a Riot with Spy vs Spy (credited to Billy Bragg) was released in July 1983 by Charisma's new imprint, Utility. Hearing DJ John Peel mention on-air that he was hungry, Bragg rushed to the BBC with a mushroom biryani, so Peel played "The Milkman of Human Kindness" from Life's a Riot with Spy vs Spy albeit at the wrong speed (since the 12-inch LP was, unconventionally, cut to play at 45 rpm). Peel insisted he would have played the song even without the biryani and later played it at the correct speed.

Within months Charisma had been taken over by Virgin Records and Jenner, who had been made redundant, became Bragg's manager. Stiff Records' press officer Andy Macdonald – who was setting up his own record label, Go! Discs – received a copy of Life's a Riot with Spy vs Spy. He made Virgin an offer and the album was re-released on Go! Discs in November 1983, at the fixed low price of £2.99. Around this time, Andy Kershaw, an early supporter at Radio Aire in Leeds, was employed by Jenner as Bragg's tour manager. (He later became a BBC DJ and TV presenter, and he and Bragg appeared in an episode of the BBC TV programme Great Journeys in 1989, in which they travelled the Silver Road from Potosí, Bolivia, to the Pacific coast at Arica, Chile.)

Though never released as a Bragg single, album track and live favourite "A New England", with an additional verse, became a Top 10 hit in the UK for Kirsty MacColl in January 1985. Since MacColl's early death, Bragg always sings the extra verse live in her honour.

In 1984, Bragg toured the UK supporting the Style Council. Later the same year he released Brewing Up with Billy Bragg, a mixture of political songs (e.g. "It Says Here") and songs of unrequited love (e.g. "The Saturday Boy"). This was followed in 1985 by Between the Wars, an EP of political songs that included a cover version of Leon Rosselson's "The World Turned Upside Down". The EP made the Top 20 of the UK Singles Chart and earned Bragg an appearance on Top of the Pops, singing the title track. Bragg later collaborated with Rosselson on the song "Ballad of a Spycatcher".

In the same year, he embarked on his first tour of North America, with Wiggy as tour manager, supporting Echo & the Bunnymen. The tour began in Washington, D.C., and ended in Los Angeles. On the same trip, in New York, Bragg unveiled his "Portastack", a self-contained, mobile PA system weighing 35 lbs (designed for £500 by engineer Kenny Jones), the wearing of which became an archetypal image of the singer at that time. With it, he was able to busk outside the New Music Seminar, a record industry conference.

=== Late 1980s and early 1990s ===
In 1986 Bragg released Talking with the Taxman About Poetry, which became his first Top 10 album. Its title is taken from a poem by Vladimir Mayakovsky and a translated version of the poem was printed on the record's inner sleeve. Back to Basics is a 1987 collection of his first three releases: Life's a Riot with Spy vs Spy, Brewing Up with Billy Bragg, and Between the Wars. He enjoyed his only Number 1 hit single in May 1988, a cover of the Beatles' "She's Leaving Home", a shared A-side with Wet Wet Wet's "With a Little Help from My Friends". Both were taken from a multi-artist re-recording of Sgt. Pepper's Lonely Hearts Club Band titled Sgt. Pepper Knew My Father coordinated by the NME in aid of the charity Childline. Wet Wet Wet's cover dominated radio airplay and its video was shown over four consecutive weeks on Top of the Pops; on the single's first week at number one, Bragg also went on the programme to play his cover, with regular accompanist Cara Tivey on piano.

Bragg released his fourth album, Workers Playtime, in September 1988. With this album, Bragg added a full backing band and accompaniment, including Tivey on piano, Danny Thompson on double bass and veteran Micky Waller on drums. Wiggy earned a co-production credit with Joe Boyd.

In August 1989 Bragg took lead vocal on Norman Cook's UK top 40 hit "Won't Talk About It", which sampled Bragg's song "Levi Stubbs' Tears" and was a double-A-side with "Blame It On the Bassline". The track was a bigger hit a year later with Lindy Layton replacing Bragg as lead vocal.

In May 1990 Bragg released the political mini-LP The Internationale on his and Jenner's own short-lived label Utility, which operated independently of Go! Discs, to which Bragg was still contracted. The songs were, in part, a return to his solo guitar style, but some featured more complicated arrangements and included a brass band. The album paid tribute to one of Bragg's influences with the song, "I Dreamed I Saw Phil Ochs Last Night", which is an adapted version of Earl Robinson's song, "I Dreamed I Saw Joe Hill Last Night", itself an adaptation of a poem by Alfred Hayes. Though the album only reached Number 34 in the UK Albums Chart, Bragg described it as "a reassertion of my rights as an individual... and a childish two fingers [to Go! Discs boss Andy Macdonald, who'd recently signed a distribution deal with entertainment industry giant PolyGram]".

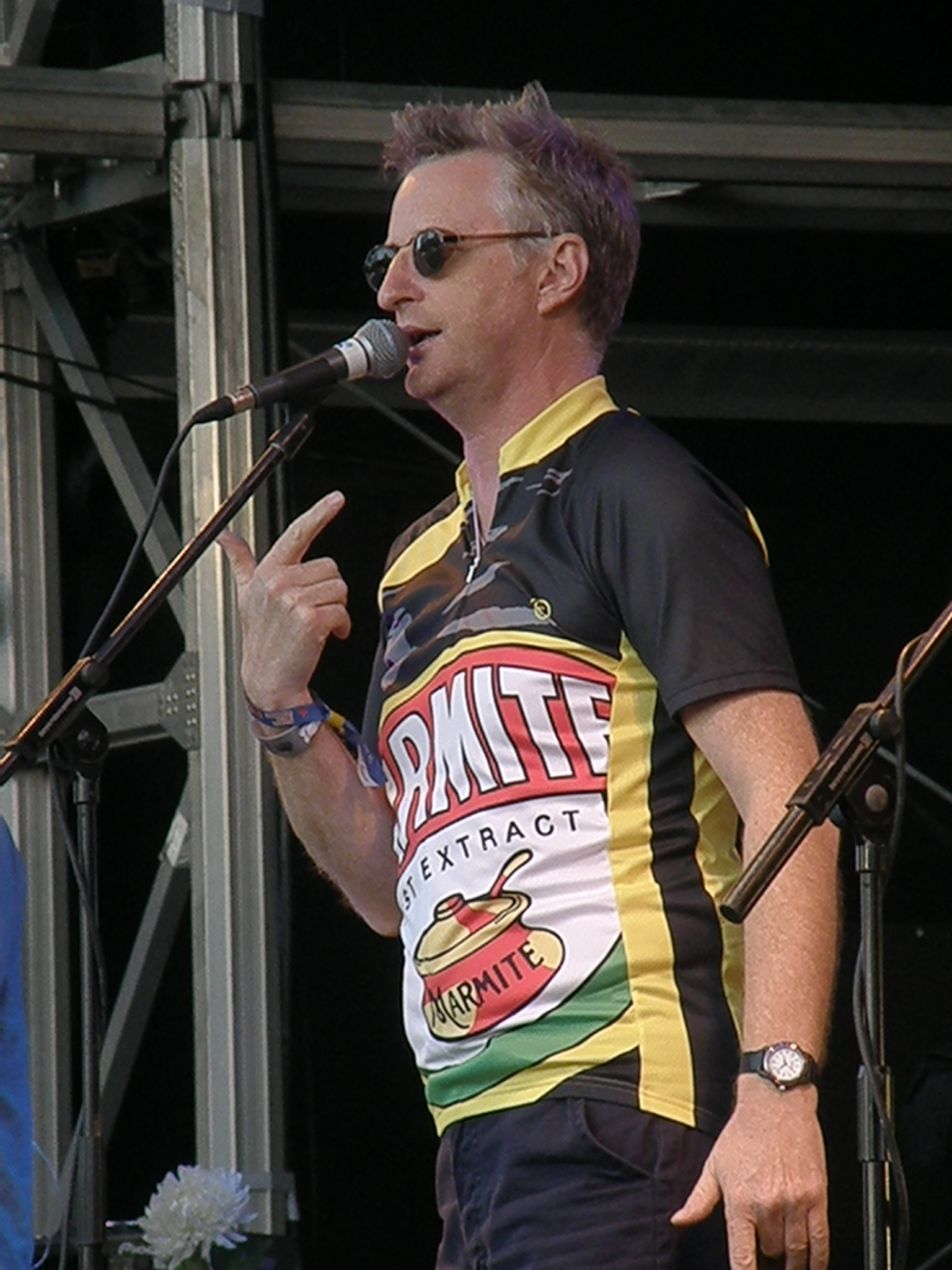
Performing with The Imagined Village at Camp Bestival, 20 July 2008

His sixth studio album Don't Try This at Home was recorded in the shadow of the build-up to the Gulf War and subsequent ground war, inspiring the track "Rumours of War". Although there is social comment ("The Few", "North Sea Bubble"), it was intended as a more commercial pop album, released in September 1991. (Bragg called it "a very long-range attempt to convert the ball between the posts".). The first single was the upbeat "Sexuality", which, despite an accessible video and a dance remix on the B-side, only reached Number 27 on the UK Singles Chart. Following overtures by rival label Chrysalis, Bragg and Jenner had been persuaded by Go! Discs' Andy and Juliet Macdonald to sign a four-album deal for a million pound advance; in return he would promote the album with singles and videos. A more commercial sound and aggressive marketing had no appreciable effect on album sales, and after a gruelling, 13-month world tour with a full band (the Red Stars, led by Wiggy), and a period of forced convalescence after appendicitis, Bragg left Go! Discs in summer 1992, paying back the remainder of his advance in return for all rights to his back catalogue.

=== Late 1990s and 2000s ===
Bragg released the album William Bloke in 1996 after taking time off to help new partner Juliet Wills raise their son Jack. (There is a reference to him in the track "Brickbat": "Now you'll find me with the baby, in the bathroom".) After the ambitious instrumentation of Don't Try This at Home, it was a simpler record, musically, more personal and even spiritual, lyrically (its title a pun on the name of 18th-century English poet William Blake, who is referenced in the song "Upfield").

Around that time, Nora Guthrie (daughter of American folk artist Woody Guthrie) asked Bragg to set some of her father's unrecorded lyrics to music. The result was a collaboration with the band Wilco and Natalie Merchant (with whom Bragg had worked previously). They released the album Mermaid Avenue in 1998, and Mermaid Avenue Vol. II in 2000. The first album was nominated for a Grammy Award in the Best Contemporary Folk Album category. A third batch, Mermaid Avenue Vol III, and The Complete Sessions followed in 2012 to mark Woody Guthrie's centennial. A rift with Wilco over mixing and sequencing the first album led to Bragg recruiting his own band, The Blokes, to promote the album live. The Blokes included keyboardist Ian McLagan, who had been a member of Bragg's boyhood heroes the Faces. The documentary film Man in the Sand depicted the roles of Nora Guthrie, Bragg, and Wilco in the creation of the Mermaid Avenue albums.

A developing interest in English national identity, driven by the rise of the BNP and his own move from London to rural Dorset in 1999, informed his 2002 album England, Half-English (whose single, "Take Down The Union Jack" put him back on Top of the Pops in the Queen's Golden Jubilee year) and his 2006 book The Progressive Patriot. The book expressed his view that English socialists can reclaim patriotism from the right wing. He draws on Victorian poet Rudyard Kipling for an inclusive sense of Englishness. In 2007 Bragg moved closer to his English folk music roots by joining the WOMAD-inspired collective The Imagined Village, who recorded an album of updated versions of traditional English songs and dances and toured through that autumn.

In December, Bragg previewed tracks from his forthcoming album Mr. Love & Justice at a one-off evening of music and conversation to mark his 50th birthday at London's South Bank. The album was released in March 2008, the second Bragg album to be named after a book by Colin MacInnes after England, Half-English. The same year, during the NME Awards ceremony, Bragg sang a duet with British solo act Kate Nash. They mixed up two of their greatest hits, Nash playing "Foundations", and Bragg redoing "A New England". Also in 2008, Bragg played a small role in Stuart Bamforth's film A13: Road Movie.

In 2009, Bragg was invited by London's South Bank to write new lyrics for "Ode to Joy", the final movement of Beethoven's Ninth Symphony (original libretto by Friedrich Schiller), since adopted as an international anthem of unity. The London Philharmonic Orchestra performed it at the Royal Festival Hall in front of Queen Elizabeth II, whom Bragg met afterwards to earn "brownie points" with his mother, who was also in attendance.

=== 2010s–present ===
Bragg was involved in the play Pressure Drop at the Wellcome Collection in London in April and May 2010. The production, written by Mick Gorden, and billed as "part play, part gig, part installation", featured new songs by Bragg. He performed during the play with his band, and acted as compere.

Bragg was invited by Michael Eavis to curate the Leftfield stage at Glastonbury Festival in 2010, which he has continued to do in subsequent years. He also took part in the Bush Theatre's 2011 project Sixty-Six Books, where he wrote a piece based upon a book of the King James Bible. Bragg performed a set of the Guthrie songs that he had set to music for Mermaid Avenue during the Hay Literary Festival in June 2012, he also performed the same set on the Friday night of the 2012 Cambridge Folk Festival.

On 18 March 2013, five years after Mr. Love & Justice, Bragg released the studio album Tooth & Nail. Recorded in five days at the home studio of musician/producer Joe Henry in South Pasadena it featured 11 original songs, including one written for the Bush Theatre and a Woody Guthrie cover. Stylistically, it continued to explore genres of Americana and alternative country, a natural progression since Mermaid Avenue. The album was a commercial success, becoming his best charting record since 1991's Don't Try This at Home.

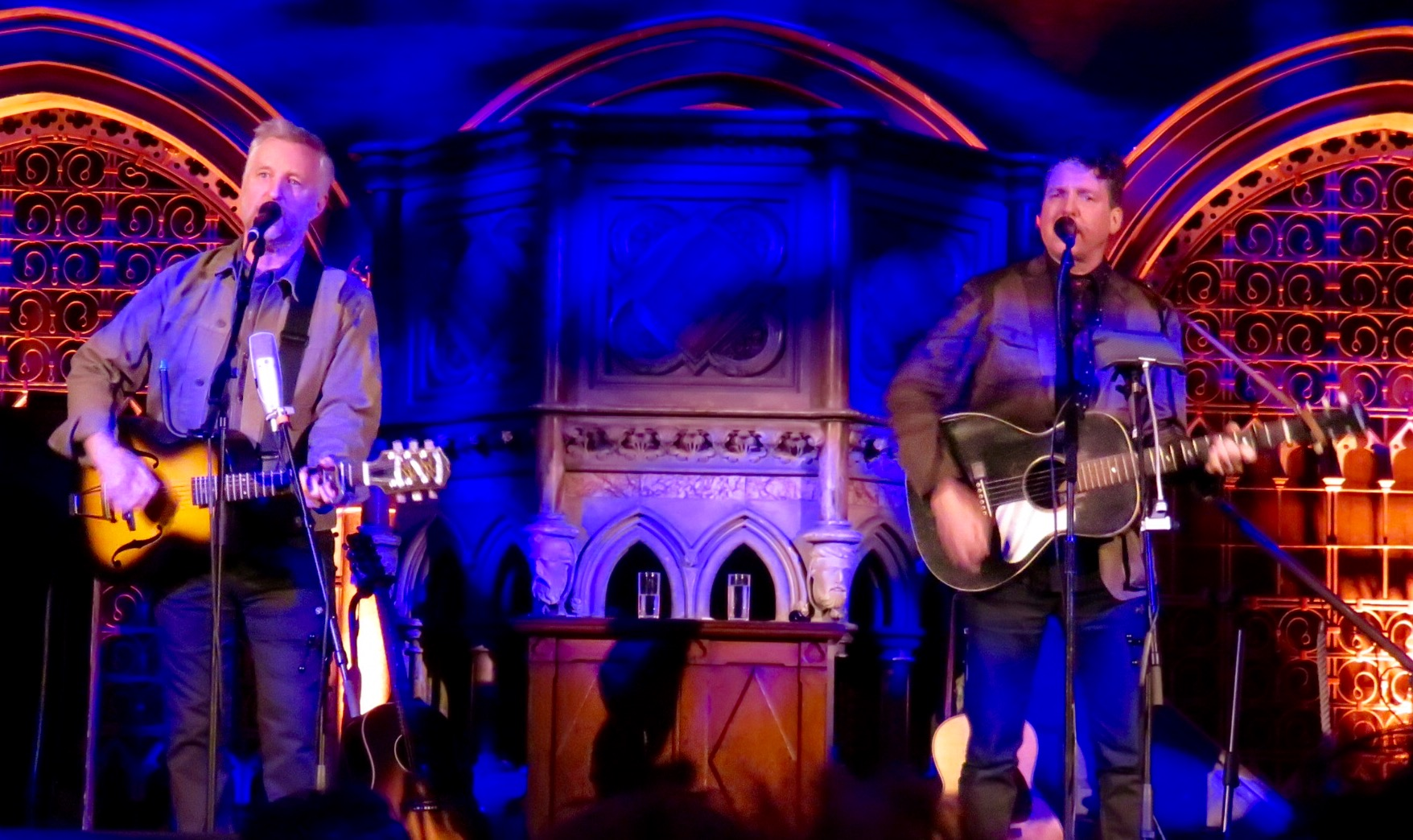
Bragg with Joe Henry at the Union Chapel, Islington.

In February 2014, Bragg started a series of "radio shows" on Spotify, in which he talked listeners through self-curated playlists of "his favourite tracks and artists, and uncovering some little-known musical gems". On 14 April 2014, Bragg put out Live at the Union Chapel, a souvenir album and DVD of a show he played on 5 June 2013 at the Union Chapel in London, featuring songs from Tooth & Nail as well as favourites from his back catalogue.

In February 2016, Bragg was given the Trailblazer Award at the inaugural Americana Music Association UK Awards in London. Following that, in September he was given the Spirit of Americana Free Speech Award at the Americana Music Association US Awards in Nashville.

In August 2016, Bragg released his eleventh album, a collaboration with Joe Henry, Shine a Light: Field Recordings from the Great American Railroad, recorded at various points on a journey between Chicago and Los Angeles by train in March. It reached number 28 in the UK Albums Chart and number one in the UK Americana album chart. The pair started a dual Shine a Light tour at the Americana Music Festival in Nashville in September 2016, and taking them across the States and Canada, the United Kingdom and the Republic of Ireland. In April 2017, they played in Australia.

Faber published Bragg's second nonfiction book (after 2006's The Progressive Patriot), Roots, Radicals and Rockers in June 2016, a history of the British skiffle movement, tracing the form from its 1950s boom back to ragtime, blues, jazz and American folk music. On BBC Music Day 2017, he helped unveil a blue plaque marking the studio (Trident) where the late David Bowie recorded two classic albums and the single "Space Oddity", in Soho; he joined album sleeve designer George Underwood and BBC Radio London's Robert Elms. In November, he released all six tracks from the mini-album Bridges Not Walls as downloads through the Billy Bragg website, followed by the single, "Full English Brexit" through Cooking Vinyl.

In April 2018, Bragg was invited to deliver a Bank of England Flagship Seminar; his presentation was titled Accountability: the Antidote to Authoritarianism. The speech was made available on the Bank of England's website. At the Ivor Novello Awards (the Ivors) in May, he accepted the PRS Outstanding Contribution to British Music award. Also in May, his official biography Still Suitable for Miners was published in a new, 20th anniversary updated edition.

Bragg ended 2018 touring New Zealand and Australia. During his shows in Auckland, Bragg road-tested a new live format for 2019 that he had first tried out in Toronto, which became the One Step Forward, Two Steps Back tour. On the tour, Bragg would play three consecutive shows over three nights at each venue: the first night a current, mixed Bragg set; the second from his first three albums; the third from his second three albums. "It's a way of keeping things interesting", he said of the format. The tour covered the United States and the UK and Ireland throughout 2019. It was intended to continue onto Australia and New Zealand in 2020, but was rescheduled and delayed multiple times due to the ongoing COVID-19 pandemic. The shows ultimately took place in February and March 2023.

In May 2019, Faber and Faber published The Three Dimensions of Freedom, a short polemic by Bragg intended, according to the publisher's blurb, to "protect ourselves from encroaching tyranny". The author urges readers to "look beyond [the] one-dimensional notion of what it means to be free" and "by reconnecting liberty to equality and accountability, restore... the three dimensions of freedom".

While unable to tour over the pandemic years, Bragg began working on new material. This resulted in his thirteenth studio album, The Million Things That Never Happened, which was released in October 2021. Four singles were released from the album: "I Will Be Your Shield", "Ten Mysterious Photos That Can't Be Explained", "Pass It On" and "Mid-Century Modern".

In February 2023, Bragg announced a compilation series entitled The Roaring Forty (1983–2023) to commemorate 40 years of performing music. These included a single LP compilation of 13 tracks, a triple-LP/double-CD of 40 tracks and a 14-disc CD box set of some 300 songs. He later announced the Roaring Forty tour, which took place across the UK, Ireland and mainland Europe from September to December 2023.

In August 2023, Bragg shared a new single entitled "Rich Men Earning North of a Million". The solo track was quickly written and recorded as an answer song to American country musician Oliver Anthony's song "Rich Men North of Richmond".

Bragg appears on a cover of the Ewan MacColl song "School Days Are Over" on the 2025 Dropkick Murphys album For the People. According to singer Ken Casey, the song is a favourite of Bragg's and said of Bragg that "Billy's become a great friend. It's inspiring how he's carried on the protest singer legacy. He really walks the walk."

== Politics and activism ==
Bragg talking to the crowd at a rally in Ferguson, Missouri, shortly after the shooting of Michael Brown

For all of Bragg's 30-year-plus recording career, he has been involved with grassroots, broadly leftist, political movements, and this is often reflected in his lyrics. He has also recorded and performed cover versions of socialist anthems such as "The Internationale" and "The Red Flag". Bragg said in an interview: "I don't mind being labelled a political songwriter. The thing that troubles me is being dismissed as a political songwriter". Bragg has cited the Clash as a strong influence on his politically themed material and activism:

It wasn't so much their lyrics as what they stood for and the actions they took. That became really important to me. Phil Collins might write a song about the homeless, but if he doesn't have the action to go with it he's just exploiting that for a subject. I got that from the Clash, and I try to remain true to that tradition as best I can.

=== From 1983 to 1997 ===
Bragg's politics were focused by the Conservative Party's 144-seat majority landslide at the 1983 general election. He told his biographer, "By 1983, the scales had fallen from my eyes". His record label boss Andy Macdonald observed that "his presence onstage took on more of the avenging angel". Bragg was at the forefront of music's influence on the 1984 miners' strike, and played many benefit gigs in towns close to coalfields such as Newport and Sunderland. He also released an EP during this year titled "Between the Wars", which connected struggles of class solidarity to the present issue. This single was his most successful up until this point, reaching number 15 on the UK Singles Chart. The following year, after playing a short Labour Party-sponsored Jobs For Youth tour, he joined other like-minded activists in the public eye to form the musicians' alliance Red Wedge, which promoted Labour's cause – and in turn lobbied the party on youth issues – in the run-up to the 1987 general election, with a national tour in 1986 alongside the Style Council, Jerry Dammers and the Communards.

Bragg travelled twice to the Soviet Union in 1986, the year Mikhail Gorbachev started to promote the policies of perestroika and glasnost. He played a gig in Leningrad, and the Festival of Song in the Struggle for Peace in Kyiv.

On 12 June 1987, the night after Labour lost that year's general election, Bragg appeared on a notable edition of the Channel 4 discussion programme After Dark, alongside David Selbourne, Teresa Gorman and Hilary Hook among others. The Independent wrote "A show called Is Britain Working? brought together victorious Tory MP Teresa Gorman; ... Helen from the Stonehenge Convoy; old colonialist Colonel Hilary Hook... and Adrian, one of the jobless. It was a perfect example of the chemistry you can get. There were unlikely alliances (Bragg and Hook)". Later Gorman "stormed off the set, claiming she had been misled about the nature of the programme" "She told... Bragg: 'You and your kind are finished. We are the future now.'" Bragg said "I sing in smokey rooms every night and I can keep talking for far longer than you can Teresa". Bragg explained later: "She was so smug. And because she was Essex I took it personally. Then she accused me of being a fine example of Thatcherism".

=== Labour in government ===
In 1999, he was invited to appear before a commission that debated possible reform of the House of Lords, at which he put forward what became known as "the Bragg Method": the arrangement of the Upper House to proportionally reflect the results of a general election. "Trying to make it sexy is impossible," he said.

At the time of the 2001 general election, Bragg promoted tactical voting in an attempt to unseat Conservative Party candidates in his adopted home county Dorset, particularly in South Dorset and West Dorset. The Conservatives did narrowly lose South Dorset to the Labour Party.

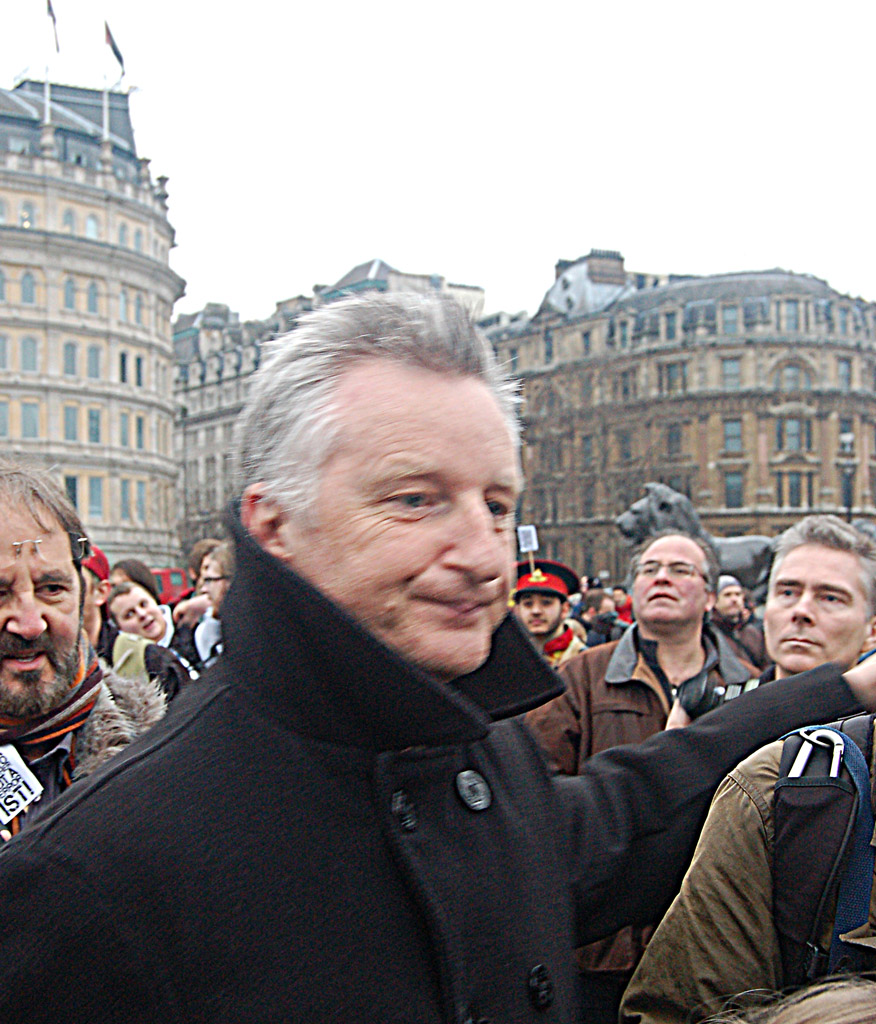
Supporting a demonstration against police misuse of anti-terrorism legislation; Trafalgar Square, London, 23 January 2010

Bragg has been an opponent of fascism, racism, bigotry, sexism and homophobia, and is a supporter of a multi-racial Britain. As a result, he has conflicted with far-right groups such as the British National Party (BNP). In a 2004 The Guardian article, Bragg was quoted as saying:

The British National Party would probably make it into a parliament elected by proportional representation, too. It would shine a torch into the dirty little corner where the BNP defecate on our democracy, and that would be much more powerful than duffing them up in the street – which I'm also in favour of.

During the 2005 general election campaign in the Bethnal Green and Bow constituency, Bragg endorsed Oona King, the Labour Party's pro-Iraq War candidate, over George Galloway, the left-wing socialist anti-war candidate from the Respect Party; due to a belief that splitting the left-wing vote would allow the Conservatives to win the seat. Galloway overturned King's 10,000-strong majority to become the Respect Party's only MP.

At the NME Awards in 2007, on the fifth anniversary of Joe Strummer's death, Bragg founded Jail Guitar Doors (taking its name from a song by the Clash), an organisation aimed at supplying instruments to prisons and encouraging prisoners to address problems in a non-confrontational way. An American chapter of the organisation was launched in 2009 by MC5's Wayne Kramer.

In January 2010, Bragg stated his intention to withhold his income tax as a protest against the Royal Bank of Scotland's plan to pay bonuses of approximately £1.5 billion to staff in its investment banking business. Bragg set up a Facebook group, made appearances on radio and television news programmes, and made a speech at Speakers' Corner in London's Hyde Park saying, "Millions are already facing stark choices: are they willing to work longer hours for less money, or would they rather be unemployed? I don't see why the bankers at RBS shouldn't be asked the same".

=== From 2010 to 2014 ===
In the 2010 general election, Bragg supported the Liberal Democrats because "they've got the best manifesto".

Bragg was also very active in his hometown of Barking as part of Searchlight magazine's Hope not Hate campaign, where the BNP's leader Nick Griffin was standing for election. At one point during the campaign Bragg squared up to BNP London Assembly Member Richard Barnbrook, calling him a "Fascist racist" and saying "when you're gone from this borough, we will rebuild this community". The BNP came third on election day.

In January 2011, news sources reported that 20 to 30 residents of Bragg's Dorset village, Burton Bradstock, had received anonymous letters viciously attacking him and his politics, and urging residents to oppose him in the village. He claimed that a BNP supporter was behind the letters, which argued that Bragg is a hypocrite for advocating socialism while living a wealthy lifestyle, and referred to him as anti-British and pro-immigration.

In July 2011 Bragg joined the growing protests over the News of the World phone hacking affair with the release of his "Never Buy the Sun" single, which references many of the scandal's key points including the Milly Dowler case, police bribes and associated political fallout. It also draws on the 22-year Liverpool boycott of The Sun for their coverage of the Hillsborough disaster.

In October 2011, Bragg joined the Occupy Movement protests in the City of London. In 2013, despite his scathing criticism of Margaret Thatcher, he urged people not to celebrate the death of the former Conservative Prime Minister:

The death of Margaret Thatcher is nothing more than a salient reminder of how Britain got into the mess that we are in today. Of why ordinary working people are no longer able to earn enough from one job to support a family; of why there is a shortage of decent affordable housing... of why cynicism and greed became the hallmarks of our society. Raising a glass to the death of an infirm old lady changes none of this. The only real antidote to cynicism is activism. Don't celebrate – organise!

In 2014, Bragg joined the March in March anti-government protests in Sydney, Australia.

In June 2014, Bragg joined other musicians (including Radiohead's Ed O'Brien) in backing a call for the EU to intervene in a dispute between YouTube and independent labels. According to a BBC News report, the video-streaming site was offering "non-negotiable contracts" to its planned, Spotify-like music-subscription service to labels such as XL Recordings, 4AD, Cooking Vinyl and Domino "accompanied by the threat that music videos they have posted to their YouTube channels will be blocked from site altogether if they do not agree to the terms".

Bragg supports both Scottish and Welsh independence. In 2014, after David Bowie spoke in favour of Scotland remaining part of the UK, Bragg said, "Bowie's intervention encourages people in England to discuss the issues of the independence referendum, and I think English people should be discussing it, so I welcome his intervention". Bragg was a vocal supporter of Scottish independence during the campaign prior to the referendum on 18 September 2014. Bragg wrote an article for The Guardian newspaper on 16 September, in which he addressed the objections he had previously received from people who conflated Scottish nationalism with the far-right ethos of the BNP. He described the independence campaign as "civic nationalism" and his opinion piece concluded:

Support for Scottish self-determination might not fit neatly into any leftwing pigeonhole, but it does chime with an older progressive tradition that runs deep in English history – a dogged determination to hold the over-mighty to account. If, during the constitutional settlement that will follow the referendum, we in England can rediscover our Roundhead tradition, we might yet counter our historic weakness for ethnic nationalism with an outpouring of civic engagement that creates a fairer society for all.

=== 2015 to present ===
Bragg was one of several celebrities who endorsed the parliamentary candidacy of the Green Party's Caroline Lucas at the 2015 general election. In August 2015, Bragg endorsed Jeremy Corbyn's campaign in the Labour Party leadership election. He said: "His [Corbyn's] success so far shows you how bland our politics have become, in the aim of winning those swing voters in middle England the Labour Party has lost touch with its roots. We live in a time of austerity and what you want from that is not more austerity, you want compassion". On an edition of Question Time in October 2015, he said that Corbyn represents a political "urge for change" and that Ed Miliband had failed to win the 2015 general election because Miliband and the party followed "the old way of doing things". In 2016, Bragg, along with numerous other celebrities, toured the UK to support Corbyn's bid to become prime minister. He also voiced his support for Remain in the 2016 EU referendum.

In August 2016, The Times reported that at the Edinburgh Book Festival, Bragg had said: "I worry about Jeremy that he's a kind of twentieth century Labour man", and that "we need to be reaching out to people". Described as a "previously loyal supporter", who has "lent his support to Mr Corbyn on numerous occasions since he became Labour leader", The Times quoted Bragg: "I don't have a simple answer. My hope is that the party does not split and that we resolve this stalemate." Corbyn at the time was campaigning in an enforced second leadership election in the summer of 2016.

After The Times article appeared, the singer tweeted that he had "joined the long list of people stitched up by the Murdoch papers" and accused the Times of "twisting my words to attack Corbyn", urging "don't let Murdoch sow discord". The Guardian reproduced a quote from a recording of the event absent from The Times article: "It's a challenge. Labour has fires to fight on different fronts. This would be happening even without Corbyn if any of the other candidates had won last year, these problems would still be there". In August 2016, Bragg also endorsed Jeremy Corbyn's campaign in the Labour Party leadership election.

During the general election campaign in May 2017, Bragg added his signature to a letter published in The Guardian calling for Labour to withdraw its candidates in two constituencies; Brighton Pavilion and the Isle of Wight and potentially allowing the Green Party to defeat the Tories in both, where Labour were running second. The letter was also signed by Labour MP Clive Lewis, former policy chief Jon Cruddas, former shadow children's minister Tulip Siddiq and journalists Paul Mason and Owen Jones. The initiative was shut down by Jeremy Corbyn.

In June 2019, Bragg publicly criticised fellow singer-songwriter Morrissey for his recent political comments and endorsement of a far-right political party, and accused him of dragging the legacy of Johnny Marr and the Smiths "through the dirt".

In November 2019, Bragg endorsed the Labour Party in the 2019 general election.

In 2025, Bragg released "Hundred Year Hunger", a protest song about hunger and food insecurity in Gaza.

On 28 January 2026, Bragg released "City of Heroes", a protest song against United States Immigration and Customs Enforcement (ICE) in the aftermath of the fatal shootings of Renée Good and Alex Pretti by federal agents in Minneapolis. The song was released just hours after the release of Bruce Springsteen's "Streets of Minneapolis", another protest song against ICE.

== Personal life ==
With his partner Juliet, Bragg has a son, singer-songwriter Jack Valero.

Bragg supports West Ham United F.C.

== Bibliography ==
- Bragg, Billy (2006). The Progressive Patriot: A Search for Belonging. London: Bantam Press. ISBN 978-0-593-05343-0.
- — (5 March 2009). "How we all lost when Thatcher won". The Guardian. London.
- — (2015). A Lover Sings: Selected Lyrics. Faber & Faber. ISBN 978-0571328598.
- — (2017). Roots, Radicals and Rockers: How Skiffle Changed the World. London: Faber & Faber. ISBN 978-0-571-32774-4.
- — (2019). The Three Dimensions of Freedom. London: Faber & Faber. ISBN 978-0-571-35321-7.

== Discography ==
- Life's a Riot with Spy vs Spy (1983)
- Brewing Up with Billy Bragg (1984)
- Talking with the Taxman About Poetry (1986)
- Workers Playtime (1988)
- The Internationale (1990)
- Don't Try This at Home (1991)
- William Bloke (1996)
- England, Half-English (2002) (with the Blokes)
- Mr Love & Justice (2008)
- Tooth & Nail (2013)
- Bridges Not Walls (2017)
- The Million Things That Never Happened (2021)
