= The Roaring Forty (1983–2023) =

Compilation album by Billy Bragg
- Released: 27 October 2023
- Length: 138:41
- Label: Cooking Vinyl

Billy Bragg chronology
The Million Things That Never Happened (2021)	The Roaring Forty (1983–2023) (2023)

The Roaring Forty (1983–2023) is a compilation album by English singer Billy Bragg, released on 27 October 2023 through Cooking Vinyl. It was released in several versions: one with 40 tracks; a "standard" edition with 13 tracks; and a 14-disc box set containing all of Bragg's studio albums, the live album Shine a Light: Field Recordings from the Great American Railroad as well as a disc of rare and previously unreleased recordings, with extras on each disc. The album received acclaim from critics.

== Critical reception ==
Professional ratings
Aggregate scores
Source	Rating
Metacritic	85/100
Review scores
Source	Rating
AllMusic	4/5 stars
The Guardian	4/5 stars
Mojo	4/5 stars
Record Collector	5/5 stars

The Roaring Forty (1983–2023) received a score of 85 out of 100 on review aggregator Metacritic based on six critics' reviews, indicating "universal acclaim". Mark Deming of AllMusic felt that the "sequence replicates Bragg's journey as a musician and spokesman very well, from his days as a one-man-Clash to his contemporary position of one of the U.K.'s last great pub rockers", observing that "nearly all of his best and best-known songs are on board, including a few choice rarities" and calling it "great music with heart, soul, and a conscience". Reviewing the 14-disc box set, Record Collector called it "a moving trawl through the life and times of an extraordinary artist who has never stood still". Alexis Petridis of The Guardian named it album of the week, and stated that "Bragg did transcend his era, and The Roaring Forty suggests why" as "it says something about Bragg's longevity" that "he has been a fixture of alternative music and leftist politics for so long that it's worth noting how unlikely it seemed, during his first flush of fame, that he would ever warrant a compilation celebrating the 40th anniversary of his solo career". Mojo wrote that "when his sturdy tunes do hit the jackpot, one wonders why Kirsty MacColl's hit with 'A New England' is such a rare cover. [...] Like all political songsmiths, Bragg seeks to transcend the didactic and stir the blood, and largely succeeds".

== Track listing ==
=== Standard edition ===
The Roaring Forty (1983–2023) track listing
No.	Title	Original Album	Length
1.	"A New England"	Life's a Riot with Spy vs Spy	2:13
2.	"Between the Wars"	Between the Wars EP	2:28
3.	"Levi Stubbs' Tears"	Talking with the Taxman About Poetry	3:31
4.	"Greetings to the New Brunette"	Talking with the Taxman About Poetry	3:31
5.	"Waiting for the Great Leap Forwards"	Waiting for the Great Leap Forwards	4:35
6.	"Sexuality"	Don't Try This at Home	3:48
7.	"Accident Waiting to Happen" (Red Star version)	Reaching to the Converted	3:49
8.	"Upfield"		4:07
9.	"The Boy Done Good"	Bloke on Bloke	3:21
10.	"California Stars" (live October/November 1998; with the Blokes)		3:57
11.	"I Keep Faith"	Mr Love & Justice	4:33
12.	"The L&N Don't Stop Here Anymore" (with Joe Henry)	Shine a Light: Field Recordings From the Great American Railroad	4:30
13.	"I Will Be Your Shield"	The Million Things That Never Happened	3:33
Total length:			48:03

=== Deluxe edition ===
The Roaring Forty (1983–2023) disc one track listing
No.	Title	Length
1.	"A New England"	2:13
2.	"The Milkman of Human Kindness"	2:48
3.	"To Have and to Have Not"	2:32
4.	"The Man in the Iron Mask"	2:13
5.	"St. Swithin's Day"	3:50
6.	"The Saturday Boy"	3:29
7.	"Between the Wars"	2:28
8.	"The World Turned Upside Down"	2:34
9.	"Which Side Are You On?"	2:33
10.	"Levi Stubbs' Tears"	3:31
11.	"Greetings to the New Brunette"	3:31
12.	"There Is Power in a Union"	2:49
13.	"Help Save the Youth of America"	2:49
14.	"She's Leaving Home" (featuring Cara Tivey)	3:01
15.	"She's Got a New Spell"	3:25
16.	"Must I Paint You a Picture"	5:31
17.	"Waiting for the Great Leap Forwards"	4:35
18.	"The Internationale"	3:48
19.	"Tank Park Salute"	3:29
20.	"Sexuality"	3:48
21.	"Accident Waiting to Happen" (Red Star version)	3:49
Total length:		68:46

The Roaring Forty (1983–2023) disc two track listing
No.	Title	Length
1.	"Upfield"	4:07
2.	"The Boy Done Good"	3:21
3.	"Walt Whitman's Niece" (with Wilco)	3:51
4.	"Way Over Yonder in the Minor Key" (with Wilco)	4:05
5.	"My Flying Saucer" (with Wilco)	1:45
6.	"California Stars" (live October/November 1998; with the Blokes)	3:57
7.	"England, Half English" (with the Blokes)	2:25
8.	"Some Days I See the Point" (with the Blokes)	4:56
9.	"Take Down the Union Jack" (band version; with the Blokes)	3:21
10.	"Old Clash Fan Fight Song"	2:33
11.	"I Keep Faith"	4:33
12.	"Never Buy the Sun"	3:43
13.	"Bugeye Jim" (with Wilco)	3:14
14.	"No One Knows Nothing Anymore"	4:31
15.	"Handyman Blues"	3:03
16.	"The L&N Don't Stop Here Anymore" (with Joe Henry)	4:30
17.	"King Tide and the Sunny Day Flood"	2:59
18.	"Mid-Century Modern"	5:28
19.	"I Will Be Your Shield"	3:33
Total length:		69:55; 138:41

== Charts ==
Chart performance for The Roaring Forty (1983–2023)
Chart (2022–2023)	Peak position
Australian Albums (ARIA)	190
German Albums (Offizielle Top 100)	79
Scottish Albums (Official Charts)	10
UK Albums (Official Charts)	29
UK Independent Albums (Official Charts)	6
