= Leap =

Leap or LEAP may refer to:

== Computing and technology ==
- Leap (computer worm)
- LEAP (programming language)
- Leap Motion, a motion-sensing technology company
- Leap Wireless, a provider of wireless services
- Lightweight Extensible Authentication Protocol, for wireless computer networks
- Local-electrode atom probe, an atomic-resolution microscope
- LEAP, the Low Emissions Analysis Platform energy systems modeling framework

== Education ==
- LEAP High School, a high school for English language students
- Leap (education and training), a project in Suffolk, England
- Louisiana Educational Assessment Program (LEAP), including the integrated Louisiana Educational Assessment Program (iLEAP)

== Entertainment ==
- Leap (Drop Trio album), a 2004 album by Drop Trio
- Leap (James Bay album), a 2022 album by James Bay
- Leap (music), a melodic interval
- Ballerina (2016 film), a French/Canadian animated film also known as Leap!
- Leap (film), a 2020 Chinese biographical film, based on the China women's national volleyball team
- "Leap" (Agents of S.H.I.E.L.D.)

== Places ==
- Leap, County Cork, a village in Ireland
- Randolph's Leap, a country area in Moray, Scotland

== Transportation and aerospace ==
- CFM International LEAP, a turbofan jet engine
- LEAP, ICAO code for Empuriabrava Airfield in Girona province in Spain
- LEAPTech (Leading Edge Asynchronous Propeller Technology), a NASA project to demonstrate distributed electric propulsion for future aircraft
- Lightweight Exo-Atmospheric Projectile, a lightweight miniaturized kinetic kill vehicle

== Other uses ==
- Law Enforcement Action Partnership, crime and law employees who advocate policies in the name of public safety
- Law Enforcement Availability Pay, a type of premium pay for federal law enforcement officers
- Leap Manifesto, Canadian activist manifesto during 2015 campaign
- LEAPS (finance), long-term stock options
- Leap2020, a think tank analyzing from a European perspective

== See also ==
- The Leap (disambiguation)
- Giant Leap (disambiguation)
- Great Leap (disambiguation)
- Leap of faith (disambiguation)
- Leapfrog (disambiguation)
- Leap second
- Leap year (disambiguation)
- LEEP (disambiguation)
- Quantum leap, an Atomic electron transition
