= Must I Paint You a Picture? The Essential Billy Bragg =

2003 greatest hits album by Billy Bragg

Greatest hits album by Billy Bragg
- Released: 28 October 2003
- Recorded: 1983–2001
- Genre: Rock
- Length: 2:47:22
- Labels: Elektra (UK), Rhino (US)
- Producers: Grant Showbiz, Oliver Hitch, Edward de Bono, John Porter, Kenny Jones

Billy Bragg chronology
| England, Half English (2002) | Must I Paint You a Picture? The Essential Billy Bragg (2003) | Volume 1 (2006) |

Professional ratings
Review scores
| Source | Rating |
|---|---|
| Allmusic | 4/5 stars |
| Mojo | 4/5 stars |
| musicOMH | (favorable) |
| No Ripcord | 9/10 stars |
| Q | 4/5 stars |
| The Rolling Stone Album Guide | 4.5/5 stars |
| Uncut | 4/5 stars |

Must I Paint You a Picture? The Essential Billy Bragg, is a three CD collection of Billy Bragg's greatest hits and B-sides, released on 28 October 2003. It consists of a double album and a disc of ten extras. Subscribers to Billy's website voted on their favourite tracks and these votes were used to compile the CD collection.

== Track listing ==
=== Disc one ===
1. "A New England"
2. "Man in the Iron Mask"
3. "Milkman of Human Kindness"
4. "To Have and to Have Not"
5. "A Lover Sings"
6. "St. Swithin's Day"
7. "Saturday Boy"
8. "Between the Wars"
9. "World Turned Upside Down"
10. "Levi Stubbs' Tears"
11. "Walk Away Renee"
12. "Greetings to the New Brunette"
13. "There is Power in a Union"
14. "Help Save the Youth of America"
15. "Warmest Room"
16. "Must I Paint You a Picture?"
17. "She's Got a New Spell"
18. "Price I Pay"
19. "Valentine's Day is Over"
20. "Waiting for the Great Leap Forwards"

=== Disc two ===
1. "Sexuality"
2. "Cindy of a Thousand Lives"
3. "Moving the Goalposts"
4. "Tank Park Salute"
5. "You Woke Up My Neighbourhood"
6. "Accident Waiting to Happen" (Red Stars Version)
7. "Sulk"
8. "Upfield"
9. "The Fourteenth of February"
10. "Brickbat"
11. "The Space Race is Over"
12. "Boy Done Good"
13. "Ingrid Bergman"
14. "Way Over Yonder in the Minor Key"
15. "My Flying Saucer"
16. "All You Fascists Bound to Lose" (Blokes version)
17. "NPWA (No Power Without Accountability)"
18. "St. Monday"
19. "Some Days I See the Point"
20. "Take Down the Union Jack" (Band version)

=== Disc three ===
1. "A13, Trunk Road to the Sea" (Peel Sessions)
2. "Fear Is a Man's Best Friend" (Peel Sessions)
3. "Cold and Bitter Tears" (Live)
4. "Seven and Seven Is" (Rubáiyát: Elektra's 40th Anniversary, 1990)
5. "When Will I See You Again?"
6. "Rule nor Reason" (Live)
7. "Debris" (Live)
8. "Dry Bed" (Demo version)
9. "She Smiled Sweetly"
10. "Take Down the Union Jack" (King Normal & The Rug remix)

== Charts ==
| Chart (2003) | Peak position |
|---|---|
| Australian Albums (ARIA Charts) | 60 |
| United Kingdom | 49 |
