= Reaching to the Converted =

1999 compilation album by Billy Bragg

Compilation album by Billy Bragg
- Released: August 1999
- Genres: Rock, folk
- Label: Cooking Vinyl
- Producers: Grant Showbiz, Gary Smith, John Porter, Kenny Jones, Edward de Bono

Billy Bragg chronology
Mermaid Avenue (1998)	Reaching to the Converted (1999)	Mermaid Avenue Vol. II (2000)

Professional ratings
Review scores
Source	Rating
Allmusic	4/5 stars
BBC	(positive)
NME	(8/10)
The Rolling Stone Album Guide	3.5/5 stars

Reaching to the Converted is an album by Billy Bragg released in August 1999. It is a collection of B-sides and rarities that spans Billy's entire career. It includes variations on old favorites, such as "Greetings to the New Brunette" (retitled "Shirley") and "Walk Away Renee". None of the tracks on the album were reissued as extras for Bragg's box sets, Volume 1 and Volume 2.

The original album cover has the subtitle "(Minding The Gaps)".

== Track listing ==
All tracks composed by Billy Bragg; except where indicated

1. "Shirley"
2. "Sulk" (words: Billy Bragg; music: Billy Bragg, Cara Tivey)
3. "Accident Waiting to Happen" (Red Star Version)
4. "The Boy Done Good" (words: Billy Bragg; music: Johnny Marr)
5. "Heart Like a Wheel" (Anna McGarrigle)
6. "Bad Penny"
7. "Ontario, Quebec and Me"
8. "Walk Away Renée" (Version) (music: Mike Lookofsky, Tony Sansone, Bob Calilli; monologue: Billy Bragg)
9. "Rule Nor Reason"
10. "Days Like These" (UK Version)
11. "Think Again" (Dick Gaughan)
12. "Scholarship Is the Enemy of Romance"
13. "Wishing the Days Away" (Ballad Version)
14. "The Tatler" (Ry Cooder, Russ Titelman)
15. "Jeane" (Steven Morrissey, Johnny Marr)
16. "She's Leaving Home" (John Lennon, Paul McCartney)
17. "I Don't Need This Pressure Ron"

== Song details ==
"Shirley" – Previously unreleased version of "Greetings to the New Brunette", recorded in 1992.

- Billy Bragg – Vocals
- Johnny Marr – Everything else

"Sulk" & "Accident Waiting to Happen" – B & A-side GO! Discs [U.K.] #67 (2/92).

- Billy Bragg – vocals, guitar
- Wiggy – lead guitar
- Cara Tivey – vocals, keyboards
- Nigel Frydman – bass
- Rob Allum – drums

"The Boy Done Good" – A-side of Cooking Vinyl [U.K.] #064 (5/97)

- Billy Bragg – vocals
- Cara Tivey – keyboards
- Jody Linscott – percussion
- Lorrain Bowen – backing vocals
- Johnny Marr – everything else

"Heart Like a Wheel" – B-side of "You Woke Up My Neighbourhood" GO! Discs [U.K.] #60 (8/91)

- Billy Bragg – vocals
- Cara Tivey – vocals, keyboards

"Bad Penny" – B-side of "Sexuality" GO! Discs [U.K.] #56 (6/91)

- Billy Bragg – vocals, guitar
- Wiggy – Guitar
- Amanda Vincent – piano
- Andy Hobson – bass
- JFT Hood – drums
- Kirsty MacColl – backing vocals

"Ontario, Quebec and Me" – B-side of "You Woke Up My Neighbourhood" GO! Discs [U.K.] #60 (8/91)

- Billy Bragg – vocals, guitar

"Walk Away Renee" – B-side of "Levi Stubbs' Tears" GO! Discs [U.K.] #12 (6/86)

- Billy Bragg – monologue
- Johnny Marr – acoustic guitar

"Rule Nor Reason" – B-Side of "Upfield" Cooking Vinyl [U.K.] #051 (9/96)

- Billy Bragg – vocals, guitar
- Cara Tivey – harmonium

"Days Like These" (UK Version) – A-side GO! Discs [U.K.] #8 (12/85)

- Billy Bragg – vocals, guitar

"Think Again" – B-side of "Levi Stubbs' Tears" GO! Discs [U.K.] #12 (6/86)

- Billy Bragg – vocals, acoustic & electric guitars
- Kenny Jones – guitar
- John Porter – mandolin

"Scholarship Is the Enemy of Romance" – B-side of "Days Like These" GO! Discs [U.K.] #8 (12/85)

- Billy Bragg – guitar, vocals

"Wishing the Days Away" (Ballad Version) – B-side of "Waiting for the Great Leap Forwards" GO! Discs [U.K.] #23 (8/88)

- Billy Bragg – vocals
- Cara Tivey – keyboards

"The Tatler" & "Jeane" – B-side of "Greetings to the New Brunette" GO! Discs [U.K.] #15 (11/86)

- Billy Bragg – vocals, guitar

"She's Leaving Home" – A-side of ChildLine [U.K.] #1 (5/88)

- Billy Bragg – vocals
- Cara Tivey – vocals, piano, recorders

"I Don't Need This Pressure Ron" – B-side of "Days Like These" GO! Discs [U.K.] #8 (12/85)

- Billy Bragg – vocals
- Robert Handley – vocals
