= Back to Basics (Billy Bragg album) =

1987 compilation album by Billy Bragg

Compilation album by Billy Bragg
- Released: 1 June 1987
- Recorded: 1983–1985
- Genres: Folk, indie rock, folk punk
- Length: 57:53
- Label: Elektra

Billy Bragg chronology
Talking with the Taxman about Poetry (1986)	Back to Basics (1987)	Workers Playtime (1988)

Professional ratings
Review scores
Source	Rating
AllMusic	4.5/5 stars
Record Mirror	3/5 stars
The Rolling Stone Album Guide	4/5 stars

Back to Basics is a 1987 collection of Billy Bragg's first three releases: The albums Life's a Riot with Spy Vs. Spy and Brewing Up with Billy Bragg, and the EP Between the Wars—all of which make their debut in the United States here. This collection did not contain any new material, but did document Billy Bragg's early "one man and his guitar" approach. The songs collected on this release demonstrate major recurrent themes in Bragg's work: highly critical commentary on Thatcherite Britain, laced with poetic love songs. The collection was re-released in November 1993 on the Cooking Vinyl label.

== Track listing ==
1. "The Milkman of Human Kindness" (Life's a Riot)
2. "To Have and To Have Not" (Life's a Riot)
3. "Richard" (Life's a Riot)
4. "Lovers Town Revisited" (Life's a Riot)
5. "A New England" (Life's a Riot)
6. "The Man in the Iron Mask" (Life's a Riot)
7. "The Busy Girl Buys Beauty" (Life's a Riot)
8. "It Says Here" (Brewing Up With Billy Bragg)
9. "Love Gets Dangerous" (Brewing Up With Billy Bragg)
10. "The Myth of Trust" (Brewing Up With Billy Bragg)
11. "From a Vauxhall Velox" (Brewing Up With Billy Bragg)
12. "The Saturday Boy" (Brewing Up With Billy Bragg)
13. "Island of No Return" (Brewing Up With Billy Bragg)
14. "St Swithin's Day" (Brewing Up With Billy Bragg)
15. "Like Soldiers Do" (Brewing Up With Billy Bragg)
16. "This Guitar Says Sorry" (Brewing Up With Billy Bragg)
17. "Strange Things Happen" (Brewing Up With Billy Bragg)
18. "A Lover Sings" (Brewing Up With Billy Bragg)
19. "Between the Wars" (Between The Wars)
20. "World Turned Upside Down" (Between The Wars)
21. "Which Side Are You On?" (Between The Wars)
