= There Is Power in a Union (Billy Bragg song) =

1986 song by Billy Bragg

Song by Billy Bragg

from the album Talking with the Taxman About Poetry
- Published: 1986
- Released: 22 September 1986
- Recorded: 1986
- Studio: Livingston Studios, Wood Green, London
- Length: 2:48
- Composer: George Frederick Root
- Lyricist: Billy Bragg
- Producers: Kenny Jones, John Porter

"There Is Power in a Union" is a song written by Billy Bragg and first released on his 1986 Talking with the Taxman About Poetry album. It is set to the tune of George Frederick Root's "Battle Cry of Freedom".

It has become known as an anthem of the trade union movement, and has been played live by Bragg both as part of concert sets and on trade union picket lines. It has also featured prominently in films, including as the finale of 2014's Pride.

It shares its title with an otherwise unrelated 1913 song by Joe Hill.

== Release history ==
The song was first released on Bragg's 1986 Talking with the Taxman About Poetry album.

He re-recorded the song with The Pattersons for his 1988 EP Help Save the Youth of America (Live and Dubious).

Versions of the song feature on Bragg compilations Victim of Geography, Must I Paint You a Picture? The Essential Billy Bragg and Volume 1, and live recordings Best of Billy Bragg at the BBC 1983 – 2019, and Live at the Union Chapel, London. In 2023 it was selected as one of 40 tracks from his career to appear on the "Roaring Forty" retrospective box set.

The song has been covered by punk band Street Dogs (with altered lyrics) on their album Fading American Dream, and by the GC5 on their 2002 Singles Collection (1997–2000).

== Use in other media ==
The song is featured in the 2004 film Howard Zinn: You Can't Be Neutral on a Moving Train in which American Communist organizations march in Times Square.

The song is featured prominently as the finale to the 2014 film Pride, about London organization Lesbians and Gays Support the Miners support for striking miners of a Welsh pit village during the UK miners' strike (1984–85).

US band Dropkick Murphys play the song immediately before their performances.
