= Victim of Geography =

1993 compilation album by Billy Bragg

Victim Of Geography

Compilation album by Billy Bragg
- Released: November 1993
- Recorded: 1986–1988
- Genre: Folk
- Length: 1:18:16
- Label: Cooking Vinyl
- Producer: ???

Billy Bragg chronology
Don't Try This at Home (1986)	Victim Of Geography (1993)	William Bloke (1988)

Victim Of Geography is a 1993 collection of Billy Bragg's previous albums Talking with the Taxman about Poetry and Workers Playtime, originally released in 1986 and 1988 respectively.

== Track listing ==
All tracks written by Billy Bragg, except where noted

1. "Greetings to the New Brunette" – 3:29
2. "Train Train" (Zenon DeFleur) – 2:11
3. "The Marriage" – 2:30
4. "Ideology" – 3:27
5. "Levi Stubbs' Tears" – 3:28
6. "Honey, I'm a Big Boy Now" – 4:05
7. "There Is Power in a Union" (Bragg, Traditional) – 2:47
8. "Help Save the Youth of America" – 2:45
9. "Wishing the Days Away" – 2:28
10. "The Passion" – 2:52
11. "The Warmest Room" – 3:55
12. "The Home Front" – 4:09
13. "She's Got A New Spell" – 3:24
14. "Must I Paint You A Picture" – 5:31
15. "Tender Comrade" – 2:49
16. "The Price I Pay" – 3:33
17. "Little Time Bomb" – 2:17
18. "Rotting On Remand" – 3:37
19. "Valentine's Day Is Over" – 4:53
20. "Life With The Lions" – 3:06
21. "The Only One" – 3:25
22. "The Short Answer" – 4:58
23. "Waiting For The Great Leap Forwards" – 4:34
