= Freedom (Solange song) =

Single by Solange Knowles

from the album Johnson Family Vacation soundtrack
- Released: 2004
- Genre: R&B
- Length: 5:10
- Songwriters: Solange Knowles, Ian Varley, Mike Blattel, Nino Batista
- Producers: Solange Knowles for Music World Entertainment, Ian Varley, Mike "Nuje" Blattel, Nino Batista for Drop Trio

Solange Knowles singles chronology
"True Love" (2003)	"Freedom" (2004)	"I Decided" (2008)

"Freedom" is a song by American singer Solange. It was included on the soundtrack of the 2004 comedy film Johnson Family Vacation.

== History ==
Singer Solange Knowles and producers at Music World, the record label owned by her father Mathew, selected a track by Houston jazz-funk band Drop Trio after Solange, a then-rising star who released her debut album in early 2003, saw them performing at a local club in Houston and suggested co-writing a song. The result is "Freedom", with lyrics and melody by Solange and an instrumental track composed, produced and recorded by Drop Trio. The song was then used on the soundtrack for the feature film, Johnson Family Vacation, which opened in theaters on April 7, 2004 and starred Solange, Cedric the Entertainer, Vanessa Williams, Steve Harvey, and Bow Wow, among others. The soundtrack also featured songs by Ashanti, Patti LaBelle, and Barry White.
