= Mid-Century Modern =

Mid-Century Modern may refer to:

- Mid-century modern, decor and architecture, 1945–1970
- Mid-Century Modern (TV series), 2025 American comedy television series
- "Mid-Century Modern", a song by Billy Bragg from the album The Million Things That Never Happened (2021)
