= Drop Trio =

Melody-driven funk jazz band

- Origin: Houston, Texas
- Genres: Jazz
- Years active: 2002–present
- Members: Ian Varley, Michael Blattel, Patrick Flanagan
- Past members: Nino Batista, Marc Reczek
- Website: www.droptrio.com

Drop Trio is a jazz band from Houston, Texas, consisting of Michael "Nuje" Blattel (drums and percussion), Patrick Flanagan (bass guitar), and Ian Varley (keyboards).

== History ==
Drop Trio started in 2002 when keyboardist Ian Varley, who had just moved to Houston, answered a classified ad on JazzHouston.com posted by drummer Michael Blattel "seeking keyboardist for jazz/funk trio". They played together, and wrote 2 songs immediately. Blattel then contacted his friend, bassist (and now photographer) Nino Batista, and asked him to jam with them. After learning those 2 songs from a rough recording of the session, Batista jammed with Blattel and Varley. Subsequently, the three formed Drop Trio in the fall of 2002. The band immediately recorded a 6 track demo called Little Dipper at Batista's home in late 2002, followed by their first album Big Dipper recorded at SugarHill Recording Studios in Houston a few months later.

By mid-2003, the tour schedule was too much for Batista to keep up with (his wife gave birth to their first child in April of that year) and he stepped down as bassist. Following Batista's departure, Varley and Blattel called on friend and Houston guitarist Marc Reczek to join the band on bass.

Reczek soon found the tour schedule grueling when added to the tour schedule of his own band, Little Brother Project. He left the band in late 2003. Batista rejoined the trio on bass, resumed touring, and ultimately recorded Drop Trio's second album on February 29, 2004, at Sugarhill with Varley and Blattel. This album, an improvised and experimental studio session, was titled Leap.

By late 2004, Batista opted to leave the band again, this time for good. He parted ways with Varley and Blattel, who began to search for a bassist. Their search led them to Patrick Flanagan from Houston. Flanagan had been playing professionally in jazz and rock bands since his early teens, gaining notoriety in North Texas as an experimental virtuoso in several bands (e.g. Fort Worth's Spiritual Hum). Soon after Batista's departure, Flanagan jammed with Drop Trio on several occasions, each time yielding more and more impressive results. Flanagan joined them on the road. The band grew into a well-respected progressive jazz trio.

Flanagan's first official recording session with the band was Cézanne. The album was recorded live at Houston jazz venue of the same name. The album has been heralded by many music critics and fans, and was a complete and total departure from the previous album Leap (which itself was a departure from the first album Big Dipper).

In 2007, Drop Trio did two tours in the United States. The first found the trio traveling from Houston westward to California and then north to Washington state, stopping in several cities along the way. The second tour took them from Houston to the east coast, including Washington DC and New York City.

== Collaborations ==
In 2003, Drop Trio was asked by SugarHill Recording Studios (where most of the very early Destiny's Child albums were recorded) to record a song by Destiny's Child for an upcoming compilation CD to be released by the studio. Drop Trio recorded an instrumental rendition of Destiny's Child's "Survivor", in their signature style of organ-dominated funk/jazz.

In late 2003, Drop Trio was approached by Solange Knowles after she witnessed their performance at Cactus Music, a record store in Houston. Knowles loved what she heard, and wanted to write lyrics and a vocal line to an existing Drop Trio song. The band agreed, and Knowles and her producers went to work. The result was Knowles' track "Freedom," a slightly rearranged version of "Lefty's Alone" from Big Dipper. "Freedom" was featured on the Johnson Family Vacation soundtrack in 2004. While the soundtrack sold less than anticipated, fans of Solange Knowles have praised "Freedom" and posted videos for the track on YouTube.

In 2004, Houston-based rapper LRJ recorded "The Ol' Hood" which featured an unedited version of "Slapjack" from Big Dipper as its backing track. The song was featured on LRJ's album The Hang Over in 2005.

== Influences ==
While the band expertly, albeit loosely, writes and performs jazz-based material with a strong funk/rhythmic groove, they are influenced by a wide variety of genres and artists. They cite jazz and funk influences such as Bill Evans, Art Tatum, Miles Davis, Medeski Martin & Wood, The Meters, Galactic, Horacio Hernandez, and also influences from the rock genre such as Yes, Rush, Primus, King Crimson, and The Beatles.

Their penchant for progressive rock, especially its heyday in the 1970s, shines through clearly on many Drop Trio tracks. Musical elements common to prog-rock, such as odd time signatures (7/4, 9/8, 11/8, etc.), meandering epic-length compositions, and classical-derived, non-repeating song arrangements have become more and more commonplace in Drop Trio's repertoire as the band has evolved.

An early example of this is "Flux" from Big Dipper, a Robert Fripp influenced track which was written almost exclusively as a study into multimeter funk grooves, replete with angular riffing and an almost clinically complex arrangement. True to the exploratory nature of "Flux", in 2005 Drop Trio performed an avant garde live set at DiverseWorks in Houston composed entirely of variations of "Flux", rearranged and rewritten to for the "concept performance" with a theme of composed and impromptu tempo and time signature studies.

== Discography ==
- Big Dipper (2003)
- Leap (2004)
- Cézanne (2005)
