= Brewing Up with Billy Bragg =

1984 studio album by Billy Bragg

Studio album by Billy Bragg
- Released: 12 October 1984
- Recorded: July 1984
- Studios: Berry Street, Clerkenwell, London
- Genres: British folk rock; folk punk
- Length: 34:49
- Label: Go! Discs
- Producer: Edward de Bono

Billy Bragg chronology
Life's a Riot with Spy vs Spy (1983)	Brewing Up with Billy Bragg (1984)	Talking with the Taxman About Poetry (1986)

Singles from Brewing Up with Billy Bragg
- 1. "St. Swithin's Day" Released: 1984; 2. "A Lover Sings" Released: 1984

Brewing Up with Billy Bragg is the second album by English singer-songwriter Billy Bragg, released on 12 October 1984 by Go! Discs.

The cover of the original album has the subtitle A Puckish Satire on Contemporary Mores, a quote from the 1975 Woody Allen film Love and Death, in which Allen's character reviews an army play presented to Russian soldiers to prevent them from becoming infected with venereal diseases while at war.

Brewing Up with Billy Bragg reached number 16 on the UK Albums Chart.

== Composition ==
While Bragg's debut album Life's a Riot with Spy vs Spy (1983) was performed by Bragg accompanied only by his guitar, Brewing Up with Billy Bragg began to use subtle overdubs, such as backing vocals on "Love Gets Dangerous", trumpet on "The Saturday Boy", and organ on "A Lover Sings". In addition to Bragg on guitar, the album features musical contributions by Kenny Craddock on organ and Dave Woodhead on trumpet.

The album also continued Bragg's legacy of political songs. "It Says Here" is a bitingly satirical attack on the British tabloid press and "Island of No Return" is a concise anti-war anthem.

== Versions ==
Brewing Up with Billy Bragg was originally released on vinyl in 1984 with 11 tracks. In 1987, the album was again released along with Life's a Riot with Spy vs Spy and the EP Between the Wars (1985) and titled Back to Basics. Back to Basics was reissued in 1990. Brewing Up with Billy Bragg was reissued on its own in 1997.

In 2006, as part of a series of reissues of albums in Bragg's back catalogue, Brewing Up with Billy Bragg was remastered (by Tim Young and Duncan Cowell) and reissued for the first time on CD with a number of bonus tracks. The bonus tracks included the Between the Wars EP and covers of "Back to the Old House" by the Smiths (with Smiths guitarist Johnny Marr playing guitar) and "The Last Time" by the Rolling Stones.

== Critical reception ==
Professional ratings
Review scores
Source	Rating
AllMusic	4.5/5 stars
Blender	4/5 stars
Entertainment Weekly	A−
Q	4/5 stars
Record Mirror	4/5 stars
Rolling Stone	3.5/5 stars
Smash Hits	8/10
Sounds	4.5/5 stars
Spin Alternative Record Guide	7/10
The Village Voice	B−

In Smash Hits, Mark Ellen summarised Brewing Up with Billy Bragg as "more of the same" from Bragg, "only better ... raw, clipped, witty songs about love, life, politics, the press and a lot of other things he seems to take so personally." Sounds critic Billy Black deemed it "an unmitigated success" showing "how far the Art of Billy Bragg has come on", while in Record Mirror, Andy Strike found the music more varied than on Life's a Riot with Spy vs Spy, noting the addition of "organ, trumpet, guitar over dubs and harmony vocals" and calling Bragg's guitar playing "more entertaining" than before. Praising Bragg's songwriting, Danny Kelly of NME observed that while the album's political songs "are more acidly Quixotic than ever", the songs about romance "cut even deeper". Kelly had only minor reservations with the record's sparse production, writing that "the patented Bragg guitar/voice format, now bereft of the shock of the new, needs more splashes of the sort of colour afforded by Woodhead's trumpet." At the end of 1984, Brewing Up with Billy Bragg was ranked as the year's sixth-best album by NME.

Retrospectively, AllMusic reviewer David Cleary called Brewing Up with Billy Bragg "another clutch of memorable, clever songs", which "refined and sweetened" the "rudimentary voice and electric guitar arrangements" of Bragg's debut album. Douglas Wolk described it in Rolling Stone as "spare and unsparing, with Bragg equally frustrated by media bias and a faithless lover." In 2000, Q placed Brewing Up with Billy Bragg at number 87 on its list of the "100 Greatest British Albums Ever".

== Track listing ==
All songs written by Billy Bragg, except where noted.

=== Disc one ===
1. "It Says Here" – 4:18
2. "Love Gets Dangerous" – 2:23
3. "The Myth of Trust" – 2:54
4. "From a Vauxhall Velox" – 2:31
5. "The Saturday Boy" – 3:30
6. "Island of No Return" – 3:37
7. "St. Swithin's Day" – 3:54
8. "Like Soldiers Do" – 2:39
9. "This Guitar Says Sorry" – 2:31
10. "Strange Things Happen" – 2:38
11. "A Lover Sings" – 3:54

=== Disc two (2006 reissue) ===
1. "It Must Be a River" – 2:19
2. "Won't Talk About It" – 5:06
3. "Talking Wag Club Blues" – 2:59
4. "You Got the Power" (James Brown, George Terry) – 3:10
5. "The Last Time" (Mick Jagger, Keith Richards) – 2:55
6. "Back to the Old House" (Morrissey, Johnny Marr) – 2:53
7. "A Lover Sings" (alternative version) – 3:58
8. "Which Side Are You On?" (Florence Reece, Bragg) – 2:34
9. "It Says Here" (alternative version) – 2:36
10. "Between the Wars" – 2:30
11. "The World Turned Upside Down" (Leon Rosselson) – 2:35

== Personnel ==
Credits are adapted from the album's liner notes.

=== Musicians ===
- Billy Bragg – vocals, guitar
- Kenny Craddock – organ
- Dave Woodhead – trumpet

=== Additional personnel ===
- Edward de Bono – production
- Kenny Jones – engineering
- Heeps Willard – cover illustration
- Caramel/Crunch – design
- Andy Kershaw – photography

== Charts ==
Chart (1984–1985)	Peak position
New Zealand Albums (RMNZ)	23
UK Albums (Official Charts)	16

== Certifications ==
Region	Certification	Certified units/sales
United Kingdom (BPI)	Silver	60,000^{^}
^{^} Shipments figures based on certification alone.
