= Great Leap Forward (disambiguation) =

The Great Leap Forward was an economic campaign of the People's Republic of China from 1958 to 1962.

Great Leap Forward may also refer to:

- Great Leap Forward (evolution), a theory explaining behavioral modernity in humans
- "The Great Leap Forward" (The 4400 episode)
- Great Leap Forward (band), a band formed by former Big Flame member Alan Brown
- "Waiting for the Great Leap Forwards", a song by English singer/songwriter Billy Bragg
