= Solange Knowles =

American singer and songwriter (born 1986)

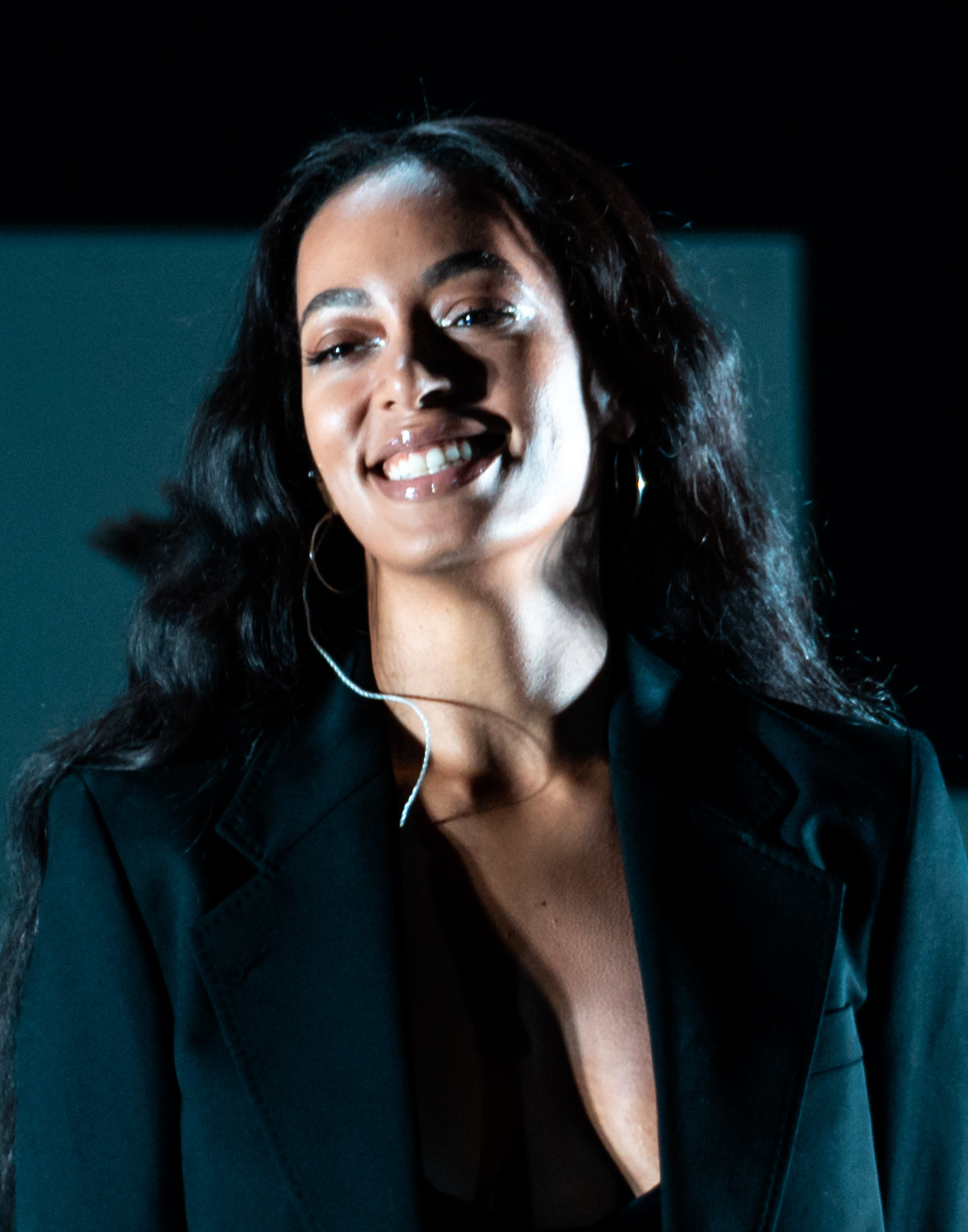
- Knowles in 2019
- Born: Solange Piaget Knowles; June 24, 1986 (age 40); Houston, Texas, US
- Other name: Solange Knowles-Smith
- Occupations: Singer; songwriter; actress
- Years active: 2001–present
- Spouses: Daniel Smith (m. 2004; div. 2007); Alan Ferguson (m. 2014; sep. 2019)
- Children: 1
- Parents: Mathew Knowles; Tina Knowles
- Relatives: Beyoncé (sister); Angela Beyincé (cousin); Blue Ivy Carter (niece)
- Awards: Full list
- Musical career
- Genre: R&B
- Instrument: Vocals
- Labels: Music World; Columbia; Interscope Geffen A&M; Terrible; Saint
- Website: solangemusic.com

Solange Piaget Knowles (/soʊˈlɑːnʒ/ soh-LAHNZH; born June 24, 1986), also known mononymously as Solange, is an American R&B singer, songwriter, and actress. She expressed an interest in music from an early age and had temporary stints as a backup dancer for Destiny's Child, which featured her older sister Beyoncé among its members, before signing with their father Mathew Knowles's label, Music World Entertainment. At 16, Knowles released her first studio album Solo Star (2002). She also appeared in the films Johnson Family Vacation (2004), and Bring It On: All or Nothing (2006).

In 2007, Knowles began to record music again. Heavily influenced by Motown girl groups, her second studio album Sol-Angel and the Hadley St. Dreams (2008) deviated from the pop-oriented music of her debut to Motown-inspired sounds from the 1960s and 1970s. It peaked at number nine on the US Billboard 200 and received positive reviews from critics. She followed this up with the 1980s pop and R&B-inspired extended play True (2012) on Terrible Records and her imprint Saint Records. Her third studio album, A Seat at the Table (2016) was released to widespread critical acclaim and became her first number-one album in the US. The album's lead single, "Cranes in the Sky" won the Grammy for Best R&B Performance. Her fourth studio album, When I Get Home (2019), peaked within the top ten and saw further critical acclaim.

Knowles says that her first passion is songwriting. Frequently compared by the media to her sister Beyoncé, Knowles has claimed that they have different aspirations and are musically different. She has been ranked by Billboard as the 100th most successful dance artist of all time. In 2017, she was honored with the "Impact Award" at the Billboard Women in Music event. Her other ventures include an endorsement deal with Rimmel London and a line of hip-hop-oriented merchandise for young children. Knowles has also ventured into performance art, working in several international museums and exhibitions, such as the Elbphilharmonie, the Venice Art Biennale and the Solomon R. Guggenheim Museum. In 2022, she became the third woman and first African American to compose a score for the New York City Ballet.

== Early life ==
Solange Piaget Knowles was born on June 24, 1986, in Houston, Texas, to Tina and Mathew Knowles. Her older sister is singer Beyoncé Knowles. Her father, originally from Alabama, is African American, and her mother, originally from Texas, is a mixed-race Black American of Louisiana Creole heritage. She is also a descendant of Acadian leader Joseph Broussard. Knowles was raised Catholic until the age of four, when her family became members of a Methodist church. As a child, she studied dance and theater. At age five, she made her singing debut at Six Flags AstroWorld, a theme park in Houston. She began writing songs at the age of nine. At 13, she decided to pursue recording, but her parents initially advised her to wait. During Destiny's Child's opening stint for Christina Aguilera's 2000 tour, Knowles temporarily replaced member Kelly Rowland after she broke her toes backstage during a costume change. At 15, Knowles replaced a departed dancer and performed with the group on tour.

== Career ==
=== 2001–2003: Early career and Solo Star ===
Managed by her father Mathew, Knowles first ventured into the music business in 2001 as the lead singer, backed by Destiny's Child, on the title theme song for the animated television series The Proud Family. She also was a featured performer on "Hey Goldmember" for the soundtrack to the 2002 film Austin Powers in Goldmember, as well as a backup singer on the track "Little Drummer Boy" on Destiny's Child's 2001 holiday album 8 Days of Christmas. In 2002, she was featured on Lil' Romeo's second studio album Game Time, singing portions of Luther Vandross-penned "So Amazing" on the single "True Love", and on Kelly Rowland's debut solo album Simply Deep, for which she also wrote the tracks "Simply Deep", "Beyond Imagination" and "Obsession". In 2001 she appeared as Lil' Bow Wow's date in the music video for his single "Puppy Love". She also made an appearance on The Master of Disguise soundtrack and made cameos in Play's video for "M.A.S.T.E.R. (Part II)" featuring Lil' Fizz.

In 2002, she lent her voice to the character Chanel, the cousin of the protagonist Penny Proud, in an episode of the animated television series The Proud Family. In June 2003, Mathew Knowles excitedly announced that he was considering adding Knowles to Destiny's Child when the group reunited in 2004, thus turning them into a quartet for the first time since short-lived member Farrah Franklin left in 2000. Mathew Knowles said he was testing the reactions, and, judging by what he had heard, "it seems like a good idea". Later in August, however, Beyoncé said it was only a rumor and Destiny's Child would remain a trio. Rowland added, "She's a solo star", name-dropping Knowles's debut album.

At age 14, Knowles started working on her debut album Solo Star, which involved American producers such as Jermaine Dupri, the Neptunes, Linda Perry and Timbaland among others. She then recorded the album under her father's Music World Entertainment label with Columbia Records. The album is primarily uptempo R&B, although Knowles said there are pop, rock, reggae and hip-hop influences. Knowles co-wrote and co-produced some of the 15 tracks in the album, including its lead single, "Feelin' You (Part II)". The song failed to enter the Billboard Hot 100, but reached number three on both the Hot R&B/Hip-Hop Singles Sales and Hot Dance Music/Maxi-Singles Sales chart. Solo Star was released on January 21, 2003, in the United States, where it debuted at number 49 on the Billboard 200 and reached number 23 on the Top R&B/Hip-Hop Albums chart. Solo Star had a mixed critical reception: William Ruhlmann of AllMusic called it a "state-of-the-art contemporary R&B album", but deemed Knowles "lost somewhere in the mix". By mid-2008, the album had sold 112,000 copies domestically according to Nielsen SoundScan.

=== 2004–2008: Films and Sol-Angel and the Hadley St. Dreams ===
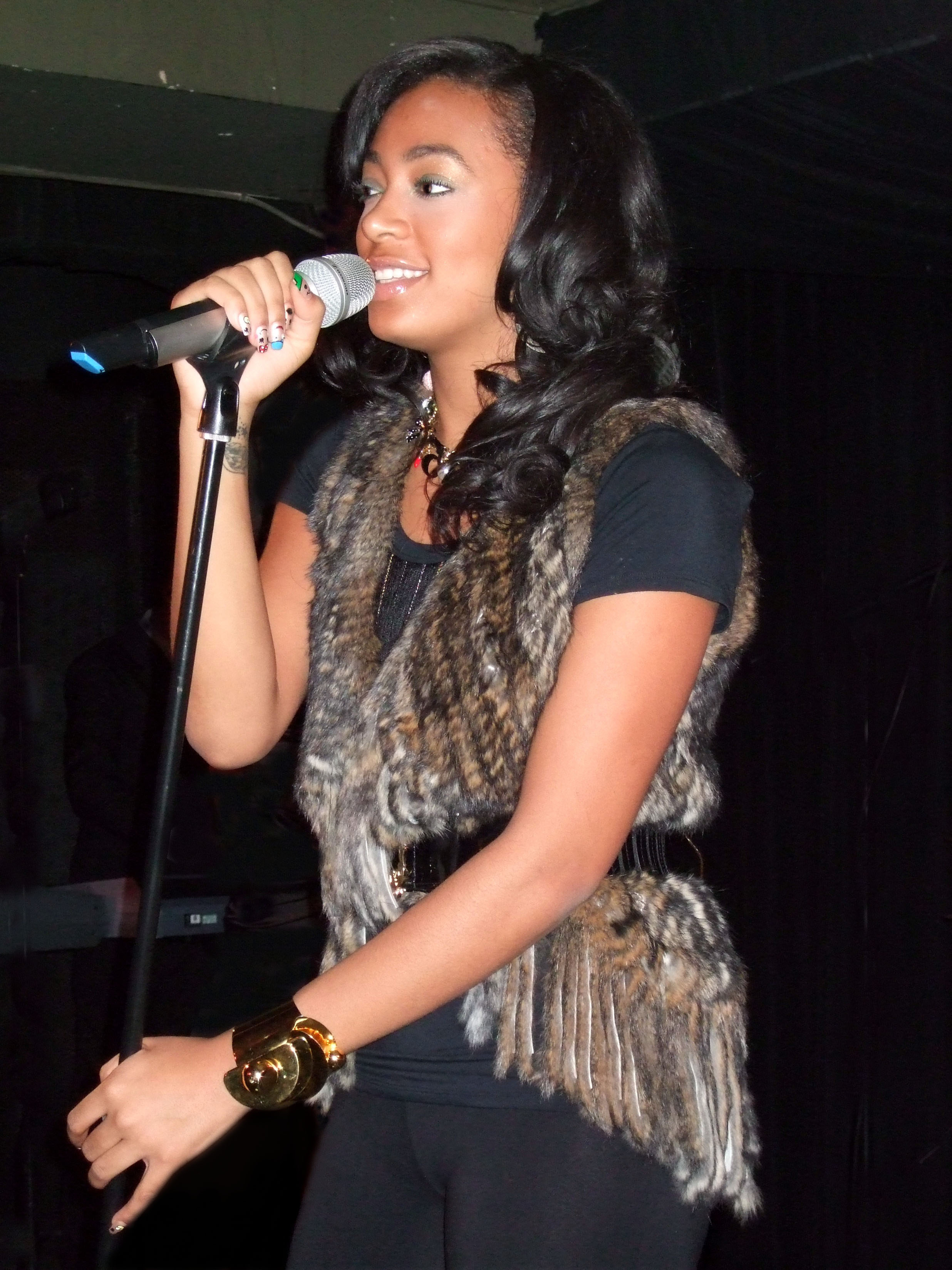
Knowles performing in Manchester in 2008

After the release of her debut album, Knowles began acting in films, followed by a career break to start a family. In 2004, she guest-starred in an episode titled "The Catch" on the sitcom One on One. Knowles appeared as a teenager in the 2004 comedy film Johnson Family Vacation, starring alongside American actors Cedric the Entertainer, Vanessa Williams and Bow Wow. She provided a song, "Freedom", a collaboration with the Houston-based funk-jazz band Drop Trio, for its soundtrack. Although the reviews were generally negative, Knowles earned praise from Variety, which opined that she "is nearly as dazzling as big sister Beyoncé and does little more than smile winningly in her first bigscreen outing". In 2006, she starred as a cheerleading captain in the film Bring It On: All or Nothing, the third installment of the Bring It On series, alongside American actress and singer Hayden Panettiere. What little critical reaction the low-budget, direct-to-DVD movie got was negative, and Knowles was described as an "affordable young starlet". Knowles uses her full name for acting, rather than just the first name she uses when singing; for Bring It On: All or Nothing, she was billed as Solange Knowles-Smith, reflecting her married state at the time.

While she was married, her family moved to Idaho, and while staying there, she resumed writing songs including the singles "Get Me Bodied" and "Upgrade U" from her sister's second solo album, B'Day. Knowles earned the R&B and Hip-Hop Song accolade for "Get Me Bodied" at the 2008 ASCAP Awards. During this time, she had also written songs for Destiny's Child, and members Kelly Rowland and Michelle Williams. In 2004, while pregnant with her son, she made a cameo appearance in Destiny's Child's music video for "Soldier".

After her divorce, Knowles returned to Houston to begin working on her second album. In 2007, Knowles renewed her management, signing a record deal with Geffen and a publishing deal with EMI. Knowles finished working on her second studio album in 2008 and titled the project Sol-Angel and the Hadley St. Dreams. It includes production by CeeLo Green, Soulshock & Karlin and Mark Ronson as well as an appearance by Bilal. A collection of 1960s and 1970s influenced songs, it is seen as a departure from her pop-oriented debut, with what Billboard called "more of a modern twist on hip-hop and R&B flecked with tinges of blues and jazz". The album was released on August 26, 2008, in the United States. By December 2008, the album had sold over 114,000 copies according to Nielsen SoundScan. The album was positively received by critics, with Ian Griffin of The Guardian considering it far better than her debut. The album's lead single, "I Decided", was released in April 2008, and reached the top of the Billboard Hot Dance Club Play chart; Rolling Stone labelled it her breakthrough single. In support of the album, Knowles began the Solange Presents Sol-Angel and the Hadley St. Dreams Tour in Britain in November 2008.

Knowles announced via her blog that she would be releasing a series of mixtapes to coincide with the album. The first mixtape, I Can't Get Clearance..., includes the leaked track "Fuck the Industry (Signed Sincerely)". On this record, Knowles expressed her views on the current state of the music industry. The lyrics to the song name check some major artists such as Mary J. Blige, Ashanti, Keyshia Cole, and Beyoncé, although she made a point of stating that it does not have "a negative light to any of [them]". The mixtape was never released, but Knowles released "Fuck the Industry (Signed Sincerely)" as a single in 2010.

=== 2009–2014: True EP and Saint Records ===
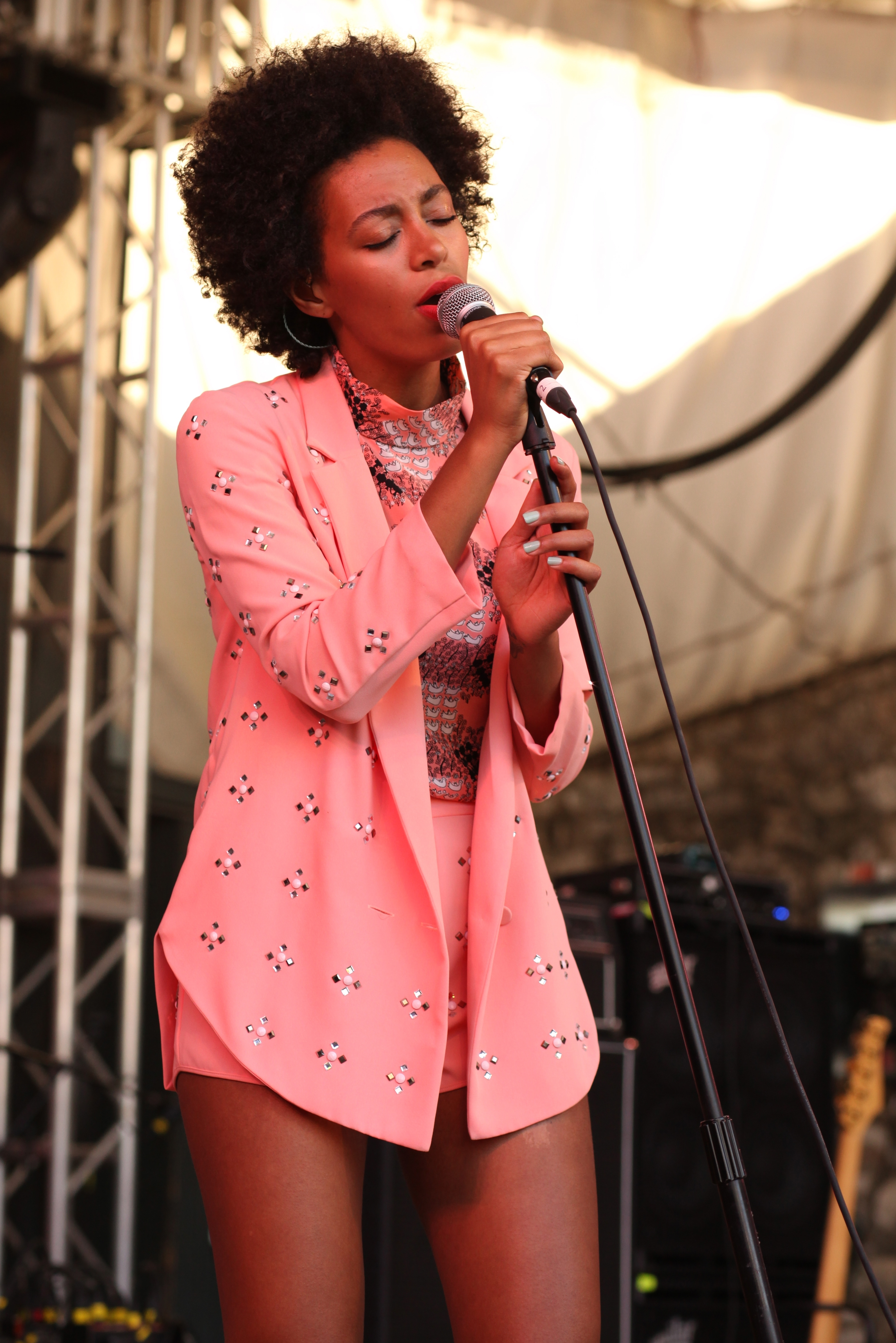
Knowles performing at SXSW 2013

In an interview with MTV in 2009, Knowles revealed that she was determining the type of sound for the follow-up to Sol-Angel and the Hadley St. Dreams. During this time, Knowles also parted ways with the Interscope-Geffen-A&M record label group and was an indie act for the first time in her career. Early in 2010, Knowles traveled to Australia to work with Australian rock band Midnight Juggernauts on her third studio album. Knowles stated she had planned to release the album in summer on her Twitter account in 2009. She also confirmed on Twitter that she rented a house in Santa Barbara, California to get into a certain state of mind while writing and making music. On May 7, 2010, Knowles made a guest appearance on the children's show Yo Gabba Gabba! for a "Mothers Day Special" where she performed the original song "Momma Loves Baby".

In an interview with Vibe on July 7, 2010, Knowles said she suffered "a little bit of a breakdown" while recording her new album: "I literally gave up my sanity for a while to do this record. [...] We literally were waking up in the morning and just making music all day and all night. [...] It just started to wear on me in so many different ways. I started having these crazy panic attacks." Knowles explained how she made sacrifices "mentally, emotionally and financially", and continued, "It's more than an album to me. It's a transitional time in my life." Regarding the musical direction of the album, she said the inspiration came from new wave and stated, "This is a dance record, but the lyrics can get pretty dark at times."

In September 2012, Knowles released a teaser video for "Losing You", which was announced as the lead single from the EP True. This release marked Knowles's first release as a signee of the independent label Terrible Records. A Melina Matsoukas directed music video was shot in Cape Town, South Africa that same month. Knowles revealed in an interview that her mother Tina had paid for Knowles and her friends to fly out and record the video as her birthday gift. On October 24, 2012, Knowles held a listening party in New York City for her EP True, released for digital download on iTunes on November 27, 2012. The CD and vinyl was made available on January 8, 2013. Following the EP's release, Knowles appeared on the cover of The Fader magazine's 84th issue.

In March 2013, Knowles performed a headlining set at South by Southwest. The following month, she made an appearance at Coachella, performing with indie pop band The xx. Her brief set included a cover of Aaliyah's "Hot Like Fire". On May 11, 2013, she performed at the Sweetlife festival in Columbia, Maryland. On May 14, Knowles announced that she had launched her own record label named Saint Records, which she would be using to release her third full-length album and future music projects distributed through Sony. Saint Records was established to focus on not-yet mainstream hip-hop and R&B artists. Knowles also collaborated with the Lonely Island on the song "Semicolon", which was showcased as part of YouTube's Comedy Week and is featured on the group's album, The Wack Album. On November 11, 2013, Knowles's record label released its first compilation album, Saint Heron.

=== 2015–present: A Seat at the Table and When I Get Home ===
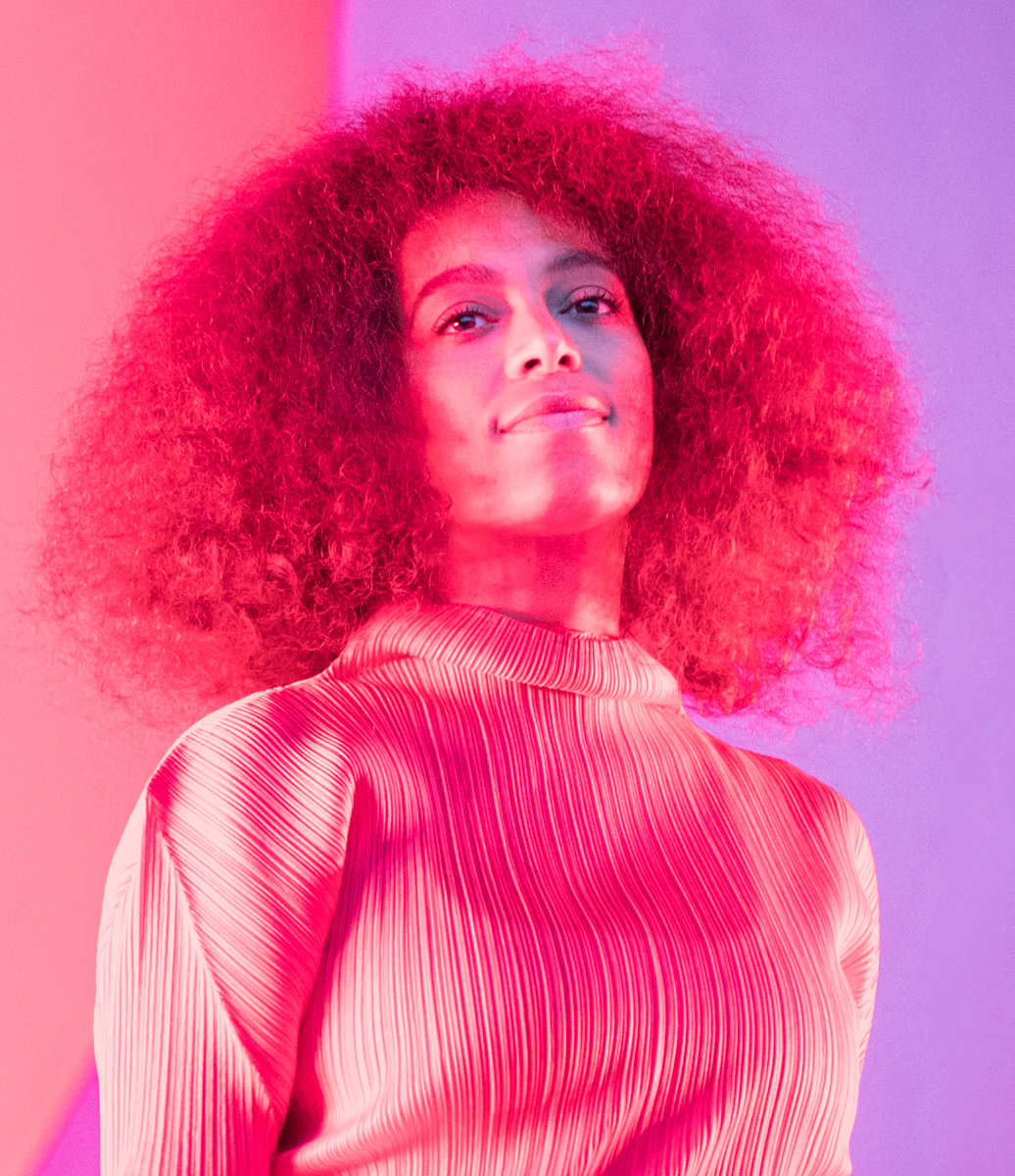
Knowles in 2017

On May 15, 2015, Knowles performed "Rise" for the first time at an HBO-sponsored event, which was inspired by police killings of Michael Brown and Freddie Gray, and the ensuing protests in Ferguson and Baltimore. In a subsequent interview with Billboard, Knowles said she was in the process of "figuring out chords and building songs" for her third studio album. In July 2015, Knowles announced that the album was nearly complete. On her thirtieth birthday, June 24, 2016, she stated that she had completed A Seat at the Table three days before her birthday, on June 21. The album was released on September 30, 2016, to universal critical acclaim. It became her first number-one album in the United States, making her and Beyoncé the first sisters to both have US number-one albums in a calendar year. On October 3, 2016, Knowles released music videos for the songs "Don't Touch My Hair" and "Cranes in the Sky", both co-directed by herself and Alan Ferguson.

In June 2017, Knowles performed at the Glastonbury Festival; her performance earned a perfect five-star review from Patrick Smith of The Daily Telegraph, who deemed her "an artist to be cherished" and the performance itself "fantastic theatre". In December 2017, Knowles directed the video for the song "The Weekend" by SZA. In 2019, Knowles performed at the Bonnaroo Music Festival, the Parklife festival, the Lovebox Festival, and the Camp Flog Gnaw Carnival. On March 1, 2019 she released her fourth studio album, When I Get Home. She previously teased the album by posting two video snippets on her Instagram and Twitter as well as a personal web page on the African-American social networking site BlackPlanet. Stereo Williams of The Daily Beast deemed the album a confirmation that Knowles "is one of the most talented singer-songwriters of her generation".

== Artistry ==
"Dancing in the Dark"
The song features a 1970s funk sound and contains a thick horn sample from Heinz Kiessling's 1960s recording "Feeling Young".

On her debut album, Knowles had no control over which kinds of music to produce, stating that "when you're 14, everyone else is older and more seasoned and you trust their decisions". She was more concerned with pleasing her record label by submitting to their desires.

Her musical influences were better expressed on Sol-Angel and the Hadley St. Dreams, when she considered herself mature and was able to write and produce songs as she wished, without worrying about the expectations of others. Knowles's lyrics tackle relationships, world issues, and deceased friends, with her second album focusing on events in her life, such as marriage, divorce, and parenthood. The album touched upon a variety of genres including pop-soul, psychedelic soul, electronica, and R&B.

Knowles's debut extended play True is a new wave album with Knowles stating, "This is a dance record, but the lyrics can get pretty dark at times". Knowles described the EP as "eclectic with 1980s references and African percussion influences". Sonically the extended play is influenced by the keyboard sounds and beats of early 1980s pop and R&B music. The EP was recorded in five cities including Santa Barbara, Los Angeles, Houston, New York, and on the German Autobahn. Her 2016 album, A Seat at The Table, discusses themes such as "black womanhood", "Southern culture and glory", and "what it means to be free and not free all at once".

== Performance art and ballet ==
Outside her work of being a singer-songwriter, Knowles has also ventured into performance art. In an interview with Surface magazine, she said "I'm not at all interested in entertainment. I'm really interested in energy exchange between the viewer and the performer. One way to do that is to make an inclusive experience through style, through energy, through space." She has put on subsequent performance art pieces throughout the world, including Witness! at the Elbphilharmonie, Metatronia (Metatron's Cube) at the Hammer Museum and Bridge-s at the Getty Museum. In November 2019, Knowles directed and composed the art and music performance In Past Pupils and Smiles at the Venice Art Biennale. In August 2022, the New York City Ballet announced that Knowles would compose a score for the Fall Fashion Gala the following September, becoming the third woman and first African American to serve in that role for the company.

== Public image ==
=== Fashion style ===
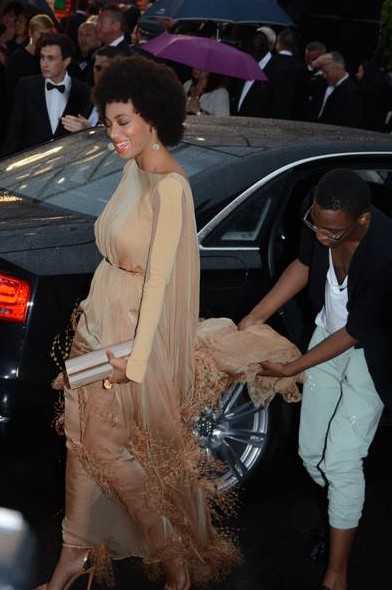
Knowles at the 2013 Cannes Film Festival

Knowles is often compared to her sister, Beyoncé, whom she considers one of her role models. She has expressed her opinion of the comparison in the lyrics to "God Given Name": "I'm not her and never will be" – which was purposely set as the opening track of Sol-Angel and the Hadley St. Dreams to show their differences. In his review for the album, Jody Rosen of Rolling Stone magazine referred to the lyrics as a declaration of independence. Beyoncé was unwilling to bring her sister into the recording industry, reasoning that it "involves a lot of pressure". Knowles countered by saying, "It's good to have her advice, but we really have different goals". In her self-titled album, Beyoncé credits Knowles with the lyric "my sister told me I should speak my mind", as she acknowledges the impact her family has made on her life.

Knowles has been described as a fashion icon by individuals including her former stylist Shiona Turini. Her knack for bold colors, mixed prints, and retro styles, as well as her knack for glamorous, fashion-forward looks in her music videography and public appearances, has become integral to her current image. She has been photographed wearing Alexander Wang, Alexander McQueen, and Chanel. The music video for her 2012 single "Losing You" featured a heavy demonstration of the contemporary sartorial movement throughout Africa, La Sape.

Similarly, her decision to grow her natural hair initially generated strong reactions from the public. In a cover interview with Toyin Ojih Odutola for Cultured Magazine, Knowles addressed her shift to minimalist fashion and the response she received from the public, "This idea that Black women could not be minimalist, we could not be subtle— we have to be big, we have to be loud, we have to be an explosive presence."

At the 2017 Glamour Women of the Year awards, Knowles wore a yellow Jean-Paul Gaultier couture gown, with a blonde afro, and was named a Woman of the Year.

Knowles is an activist for the Black Lives Matter movement. After the Charleston church shooting in June 2015, Knowles released a statement posing the following questions: "Where can we be safe? Where can we be free? Where can we be Black?" In July 2016, she marched in Baton Rouge, Louisiana in protest of the shooting of Alton Sterling; she also criticized police presence during the march.

== Other ventures ==
In 2007, Knowles began promoting Baby Jamz, a hip-hop-styled toy line for pre-schoolers. It was inspired by her son, who is fond of hip-hop music. She is the executive producer of the CD, composed of updated hip-hop inspired nursery rhymes, which is featured in all of the toys.

In 2008, Knowles was named as ambassador for Giorgio Armani's younger diffusion line, Armani Jeans. Armani said Knowles epitomizes the style, which is a "vision of a young, independent, casual lifestyle with a strong and cool, fashion sensibility". In 2009, Knowles was featured in Ocean Pacific's "Summer of Music" and "OPen Campus" ad campaigns.

In 2010, Knowles worked on the award-winning children's television series Yo Gabba Gabba!. She performed an original song "Momma Loves Baby" in the special episode titled "Baby". She also sang "Momma Loves Baby" live when the show toured the Dallas–Fort Worth area.

In 2011, Knowles, Alejandra Ramos Munoz and Zooey Deschanel were announced as the new faces of Rimmel London. At the time, Knowles was also the face of Carol's Daughter. She stepped down from this position in 2012, amid criticism of her natural hair. In 2013, Knowles was named art director and creative consultant at Puma. In this role, she curated four women's shoe collections: "Girls of Blaze" (2014), "Wild Wonder" (2014), "Behind the Baazar" (2014) and "Word to the Woman" (2015).

In 2017, Knowles became the face of a Calvin Klein campaign. In 2018, she received the Artist of the Year award from the Harvard Foundation. She became the face of Mercedes-Benz's campaign #WEWONDER and Helmut Lang's fashion campaign. She also began a collaboration for interior design with IKEA.

In 2020, Knowles was the recipient of the inaugural Lena Horne Prize. In 2022, Knowles was the star of LOUIS XIII's "Believe in Time" campaign. She was also honored with the 2022 NYU Global Trailblazer Award. In 2023, Knowles designed a glassware collection, in collaboration with glassblower Jason McDonald. In 2024, Knowles appeared alongside her mother in a Gucci Gift campaign. In 2025, she remixed Mariah Carey's 2006 song "Say Somethin'" for The Emancipation of Mimi's 20th anniversary reissue.

=== House of Deréon ===
Knowles and sister Beyoncé modeled for their family's clothing line, House of Deréon, named after their grandmother, Agnéz Deréon. She also helped launch Deréon, a junior apparel collection and sister line to House of Deréon. Both sisters modeled for Deréon, and were featured in most of Deréon's marketing campaigns. Together they were featured in a "Got Milk?" campaign ad, wearing House of Deréon.

=== Saint Heron ===
In 2013, Knowles launched the digital platform Saint Heron as a music and cultural hub to amplify Black artistry. In May 2021, Saint Heron expanded into an institution that includes a studio, creative agency, library, and art gallery. In November 2025, Knowles published Azurest Blue: The Life and Legacy of Amaza Lee Meredith, a research journal chronicling the multifaceted life and career of Amaza Lee Meredith, exclusively available through Saint Heron Library.

=== University of Southern California ===
In October 2025, Knowles announced a three-year position at the University of Southern California as a scholar in residence for the Thornton School of Music. In this position, beginning in 2027, she will work on developing a program in music curation and teach the course "Records of Discovery: Methodologies for Music and Cultural Curatorial Practices".

=== Public Art Practice ===
In September 2026, Knowles debuted her public art practice as a part of Google Chrome's exhibition "Unfinished Projects". The exhibition featured Knowles' large-scale copper sculptures displayed along the New York High Line's Chelsea Market Passage.

== Personal life ==
=== Relationships ===
Knowles married Daniel Smith in the Bahamas in February 2004, when she was 17 and he was 19. On October 18, 2004, Knowles gave birth to a son. After their son's birth, the family moved to Moscow, Idaho, where Knowles's husband continued studying in college. The two divorced in 2007, after which Knowles split her time between her residences in Los Angeles and Houston, Texas. She and her son relocated to Brooklyn in 2011, and to New Orleans, Louisiana in 2013.

Knowles married music video director Alan Ferguson at the Marigny Opera House in New Orleans on November 16, 2014. The couple separated in 2019.

That year, Knowles began dating experimental jazz artist Gio Escobar from the band Standing on the Corner, with whom she had previously collaborated on her studio album When I Get Home. Knowles publicly acknowledged the relationship on Instagram in November 2020.

=== Elevator attack video ===
On May 12, 2014, TMZ released security video footage of Knowles appearing to physically attack her brother-in-law Jay-Z and being restrained by a security guard in an elevator at The Standard, High Line in Manhattan. The video went viral, receiving media attention from news organizations and gossip columnists, with many wondering what led to the confrontation. The moment was mentioned in monologues on late-night talk shows such as The Daily Show with Jon Stewart, Jimmy Kimmel Live! and The Tonight Show Starring Jimmy Fallon. The matter was spoofed on television shows including Saturday Night Live and Family Guy. Knowles, Jay-Z, and Beyoncé called the occurrence an "unfortunate incident" and stated that the family "has worked through it". Knowles later clarified that she and her family were "all good".

== Discography ==
- Solo Star (2002)
- Sol-Angel and the Hadley St. Dreams (2008)
- A Seat at the Table (2016)
- When I Get Home (2019)

== Tours ==
Headlining

- Solo Star Tour (2003)
- The Art of Love Tour (2008)
- Solange Presents Sol-Angel and the Hadley St. Dreams Tour (2008)
- True Promo Tour (2012)
- Orion's Rise (2017)

Supporting

- Simply Deeper Tour (2003)
- The Justified World Tour (2003–2004)

== Filmography ==
=== Film ===
Year	Title	Role	Notes	Ref
2004	Johnson Family Vacation	Nikki Johnson		
2006	Bring It On: All or Nothing	Camille	Credited as Solange Knowles-Smith	
2019	Homecoming	Herself	Cameo	

=== Television ===
Year	Title	Role	Notes	Ref
2001	Intimate Portrait	Herself	1 episode	
2002	The Proud Family	Chanel	1 episode	
2002	Taina	Rachel	1 episode	
2002	Taff	Herself	2 episodes	
2003	Soul Train	Herself	1 episode	
2003	The 30th Annual American Music Awards	Herself	Award show	
2003	The Today Show	Herself	1 episode	
2003	The Brothers Garcia	Herself	1 episode	
2004	One on One	Charlotte	1 episode	
2005	Listen Up	Erika	1 episode	
2008	Ghost Whisperer	Singer	1 episode	
2008	Lincoln Heights	Herself	1 episode	
2010	Yo Gabba Gabba!	Herself	1 episode	
2018	Random Acts of Flyness	Herself	1 episode	

== Achievements ==
At the 59th Annual Grammy Awards (2017), Knowles won her first Grammy Award, for Best R&B Performance for her song "Cranes in the Sky", the lead and only single from her third album, A Seat at the Table (2016), which was Knowles's first Grammy Award nomination. In 2017, she also won a Glamour Award for Woman of the Year, and became the first winner of the Billboard Women in Music Impact Award. Knowles has won several other awards including a BET Award, a Soul Train Music Award, and a Webby Award.
