= LEEP =

LEEP may refer to:

- Lead Exposure Elimination Project, organization that works on reducing lead exposure in low and middle income countries
- Law Enforcement Exchange Program, program of the Jewish Institute for National Security Affairs involving Israeli and American law enforcement professionals
- Legislated Employment Equity Program, which is covered in the article Employment equity (Canada)
- Loop electrical excision procedure, surgery that treats cervical dysplasia
- LEEP Online Education, Library Education Experimental Program, a distance learning program at the University of Illinois
- Large Expanse Extra Perspective, a type of extreme wide-angle stereoscopic lens, developed by Eric Howlett
