= List of awards and nominations received by Solange Knowles =

Solange Knowles awards and nominations
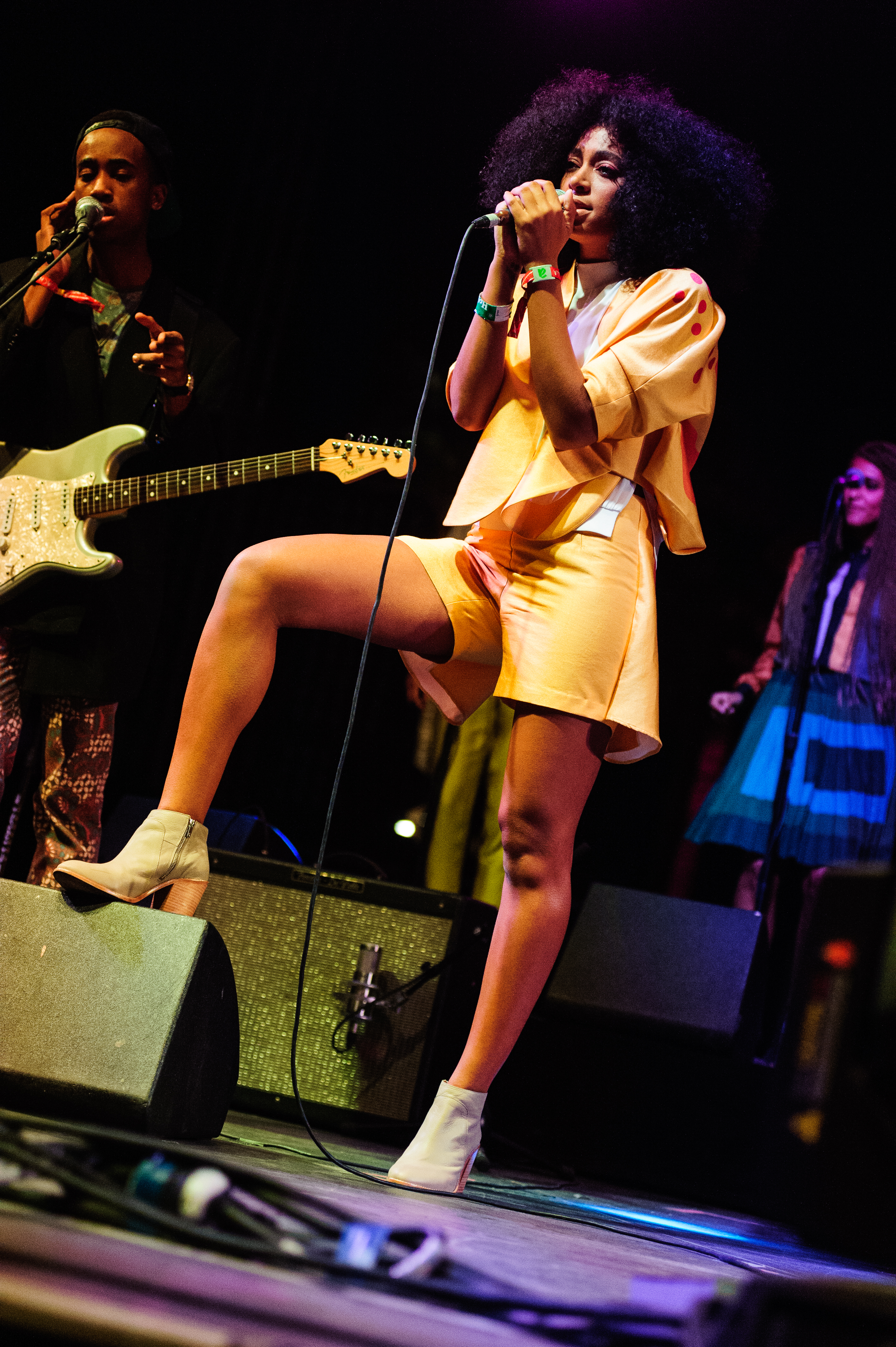
- Knowles performing at Coachella Valley Music and Arts Festival on April 19, 2014
Awards and nominations (Note: Awards in certain categories do not have prior nominations and only winners are announced by the jury. For simplification and to avoid errors, each award in this list has been presumed to have had a prior nomination.)
Awards	Wins	Nominations
BET Awards	1	5
Billboard Women in Music	1	1
Brit Awards	0	1
Grammy Awards	1	1
MOBO Awards	0	1
Nickelodeon Kids' Choice Awards	0	1
NAACP Image Awards	0	5
NME Awards	0	2
Soul Train Music Awards	1	10
Webby Awards	1	1
Awards won	11
Nominations	47

Solange Knowles is an American singer, songwriter, model and actress. In 2008, she won an ASCAP Rhythm & Soul Award for Top R&B/Hip-Hop Song for her older sister Beyoncé's song "Get Me Bodied" (2006) which she co-wrote alongside Beyoncé, Kasseem "Swizz Beatz" Dean, Sean Garrett, Makeba Riddick and Angela Beyincé. Her third studio album A Seat at the Table (2016) received numerous nominations for various awards, and won Solange her first Grammy Award, for Best R&B Performance for "Cranes in the Sky", which was her first Grammy Award nomination. It also won Solange a Soul Train Music Award, a BET Award, a Webby Award and an Edison Jazz-World Award. In 2017, Solange won Billboard Women in Music Impact Award, being the first winner in the category. The same year, she was one of the winners of Glamour Award for Woman of the Year, alongside Nicole Kidman, Gigi Hadid, Maxine Waters, Samantha Bee, Patty Jenkins, Peggy Whitson, Maria Grazia Chiuri, Muzoon Almellehan and the organizers of 2017 Women's March.

== AMFT Awards ==
Year	Nominee / work	Award	Result	Ref.
2016	"Don't Touch My Hair"	Best R&B Song	Won	

== Antville Music Video Awards ==
Year	Nominee/work	Category	Result	Ref.
2012	"Losing You	Best Hip-Hop	Nominated	
2012	"Losing You	Best Performance	Nominated	
2013	"Lovers in the Parking Lot"	Best Performance	Nominated	
2013	"Lovers in the Parking Lot"	Best Choreography	Nominated	

== ASCAP Rhythm & Soul Awards ==
Year	Nominee/work	Category	Result	Ref.
2008	"Get Me Bodied" (with Beyoncé, Swizz Beatz, Sean Garrett, Makeba Riddick and Angela Beyincé)	Top R&B/Hip-Hop Song	Won	

== BET Awards ==
Year	Nominee/work	Category	Result	Ref.
2009	Herself	Centric Award	Nominated	
2017	Herself	Centric Award	Won	
2017	Herself	Best Female R&B Artist	Nominated	
2017	A Seat at the Table	Album of the Year	Nominated	
2017	"Cranes in the Sky"	Video of the Year	Nominated	

== Billboard Women in Music ==
Year	Category	Result	Ref.
2017	Impact Award	Won	

== Black Girls Rock! ==
Year	Category	Result	Ref.
2017	Rock Star Celebrant	Won	

== Brit Awards ==
Year	Category	Result	Ref.
2017	International Female Solo Artist	Nominated	

== Clio Awards ==
Year	Nominee/Work	Category	Result	Ref.
2019	When I Get Home Visual Album Launch	Music Marketing (Bronze)	Won	

== The Daily Californian Music Awards ==
Year	Nominee/work	Category	Result	Ref.
2017	Solange at Hearst Greek Theatre	Best Bay Area Live Concert	Won	

== Edison Jazz-World Awards ==
Year	Nominee/work	Category	Result	Ref.
2017	A Seat at the Table	Soul and Beyond	Won	

== Glamour Awards ==
Year	Category	Result	Ref.
2017	Woman of the Year	Won	

== Global Spin Awards ==
Year	Category	Result	Ref.
2012	Celebrity DJ of the Year	Nominated	

== Grammy Awards ==
Year	Nominee/work	Category	Result	Ref.
2017	"Cranes in the Sky"	Best R&B Performance	Won	

== MOBO Awards ==
Year	Category	Result	Ref.
2017	Best International Act	Nominated	

== MTV Awards ==
=== MTV Europe Music Awards ===
Year	Work/Nominee	Category	Result	Ref.
2019	Herself	Best Alternative	Nominated	

=== MTV Video Music Awards ===
Year	Work/Nominee	Category	Result	Ref.
2018	"The Weekend" (as art director)	Best Art Direction	Nominated	
2019	"Almeda"	Best Editing	Nominated	
2019	"Almeda"	Best Choreography	Nominated	
2019	"Almeda"	Best Cinematography	Nominated	

=== MTV Woodies ===
Year	Category	Result	Ref.
2017	Woodie of the Year	Nominated	

== MVPA Awards ==
Year	Nominee/work	Category	Result	Ref.
2013	"Losing You"	Best Pop Video	Nominated	

== NAACP Image Awards ==
Year	Nominee/work	Category	Result	Ref.
2017	Herself	Outstanding Female Artist	Nominated	
2017	A Seat at the Table	Outstanding Album	Nominated	
2017	"Cranes in the Sky"	Outstanding Song	Nominated	
2017	"Cranes in the Sky"	Outstanding Music Video	Nominated	
2017	"Mad" (with Lil Wayne)	Outstanding Duo or Group	Nominated	

== NewNowNext Awards ==
Year	Nominee/work	Category	Result	Ref.
2013	"Losing You"	That's My Jam	Nominated	

== Nickelodeon Kids' Choice Awards ==
Year	Category	Result	Ref.
2017	Favorite New Artist	Nominated	

== NME Awards ==
Year	Nominee/work	Category	Result	Ref.
2013	"Losing You"	Dancefloor Anthem	Nominated	
2017	Herself	Best International Female Artist	Nominated	

== O Music Awards ==
Year	Category	Result
2013	Must Follow Artist on Twitter	Nominated

== Rolling Stone Awards ==
=== International Music Awards ===
Rolling Stone Germany's International Music Awards celebrate the best of music. Winners are selected by artists and experts. The first edition is set to take place in 2019.

Year	Nominee / work	Award	Result	Ref.
2019	Herself	Sound	Nominated	

== Shorty Awards ==
Year	Category	Result	Ref.
2017	Music Artist	Nominated	

== Soul Train Lady of Soul Awards ==
Year	Nominee/work	Category	Result	Ref.
2003	"Feelin' You" (with N.O.R.E.)	Best R&B/Soul or Rap Music Video	Nominated	

== Soul Train Music Awards ==
Year	Nominee/work	Category	Result	Ref.
2009	Herself	Best R&B/Soul or Rap New Artist	Nominated	
2013	Herself	Centric Award	Nominated	
2014	"Electric Lady" (with Janelle Monáe)	Best Dance Performance	Nominated	
2017	"Don't Touch My Hair" (with Sampha)	Best Dance Performance	Nominated	
2017	"Don't Touch My Hair" (with Sampha)	Best Collaboration	Nominated	
2017	Herself	Best R&B/Soul Female Artist	Nominated	
2017	"Cranes in the Sky"	Best Video of the Year	Nominated	
2017	"Cranes in the Sky"	Best Song of the Year	Nominated	
2017	"Cranes in the Sky"	The Ashford & Simpson Songwriter's Award	Won	
2017	A Seat at the Table	Best Album of the Year	Nominated	

== UK Music Video Awards ==
Year	Nominee/work	Category	Result	Ref.
2013	"Losing You"	Best Pop Video – International	Won	

== Urban Music Awards ==
Year	Nominee/work	Category	Result
2016	Herself	Best International Act	Nominated
2016	A Seat at the Table	Best Album	Nominated

== Webby Awards ==
Year	Category	Result	Ref.
2017	Artist of the Year	Won	
