= (Get Your Kicks on) Route 66 =

1946 single by the King Cole Trio

- Sheet music cover

Single by the King Cole Trio
- B-side: "Everyone Is Sayin' Hello Again (Why Must We Say Goodbye)"
- Released: April 22, 1946
- Recorded: March 16, 1946
- Studio: Radio Recorders, Los Angeles
- Genre: Rhythm and blues
- Length: 2:57
- Label: Capitol
- Songwriter: Bobby Troup

The King Cole Trio singles chronology
"The Frim-Fram Sauce" (1946)	"(Get Your Kicks on) Route 66" (1946)	"You Call It Madness (But I Call It Love)" (1946)

"(Get Your Kicks on) Route 66" is a popular rhythm and blues song, composed in 1946 by American songwriter Bobby Troup. The lyrics relate a westward roadtrip on U.S. Route 66, a highway that traversed the western two-thirds of the U.S. from Chicago, Illinois, to Los Angeles, California. The song became a standard, with several renditions appearing on the record charts.

== Background ==
Bobby Troup got the idea for the song on a cross-country drive from Pennsylvania to California. Troup wanted to try his hand as a Hollywood songwriter, so he and his wife, Cynthia, packed up their 1941 Buick and headed west. The trip began on US 40 and continued along US 66 to the California coast. Troup initially considered writing a tune about US 40, but Cynthia suggested the title "Get Your Kicks on Route 66".

The song was started during the ten-day trip and finished after consulting a map in Los Angeles. The lyrics mention several cities and towns encountered along the way; Cynthia later commented: "What I can't really believe is that he doesn't have Albuquerque in the song."

== Nat King Cole original version ==
Location of U.S. Route 66

Nat King Cole, with the King Cole Trio, first recorded the song in 1946 at Radio Recorders in Los Angeles. Capitol Records released it as a single, which reached number three on Billboard magazine's Race Records chart and number eleven on its broader singles chart. Cole later re-recorded the tune for the album After Midnight (1956) and The Nat King Cole Story (1961).

== Other recorded renditions ==
The song has become a standard and has been recorded by numerous artists:

- Bing Crosby with the Andrews Sisters recorded a version, which reached number 14 on the Billboard chart in 1946.
- Bobby Troup recorded a revised version of the song for his 1957 Liberty album, "Do-Re-Mi."
- In 1964, the Rolling Stones included a version on their self-titled debut album. In a song review, critic Richie Unterberger called it "the most famous rock version of the song ... one of the best songs on the Rolling Stones' debut album, and one of their most popular in-concert numbers on their early tours". In 1965, a live version was included on the U.K. EP Got Live If You Want It! and in the U.S. on their fifth LP December's Children (And Everybody's). The group learned the song from a version that Chuck Berry recorded for his 1961 album New Juke Box Hits, although Unterberger also notes that a version by Perry Como on his 1959 RCA Victor album Como Swings was a source for the lyrics.
- In 1982, a version by the Manhattan Transfer reached number 78 on the Hot 100. It also earned the group a Grammy Award for Best Jazz Vocal Performance, Duo or Group and was included on the soundtrack album for the film Sharky's Machine (1981).
- Billy Bragg recorded an anglicised version of the song titled "A13 (Trunk Road to the Sea)" for a John Peel session in 1985. It uses the original music, but the landmark cities are replaced with English towns along the route of the A13, with Bragg inviting listeners to "Go motoring, on the A-thirteen". According to Bragg, he wrote the lyrics while playing with his band Riff Raff in 1977: while the band played "Route 66" as part of their set, Bragg "objected to singing about these places that (he) didn't know ... there's a tradition of driving down the A13 to the glory of Southend. Growing up in Barking, that was the promised land, in quite a Springsteenish way". The song was originally meant to be released on Bragg's 1983 debut album, Life's a Riot with Spy vs Spy; however, it was ultimately not included due to problems getting permission to use the music of "Route 66". It was finally released commercially on the bonus disc of the 2003 compilation Must I Paint You a Picture? The Essential Billy Bragg.
- A version by Depeche Mode in a medley with "Behind the Wheel" reached number 61 on the Billboard Hot 100 singles chart in May 1988.
- Michael Martin Murphey recorded the song for his 1989 album Land of Enchantment. Released as a single in 1990, it peaked at number 67 on the Billboard Hot Country Singles & Tracks chart.
- The 2006 Disney/Pixar animated film Cars includes renditions by Chuck Berry and John Mayer. Mayer's version was nominated for a Grammy award for Best Solo Rock Vocal Performance.

== See also ==
- Billboard Most-Played Race Records of 1946
