= Great Leap =

The Great Leap may refer to:

- The Great Leap (film) (German: Der grosse Sprung), 1927 German silent comedy film directed by Arnold Fanck and starring Leni Riefenstahl
- The Great Leap (Phideaux album)
- The Great Leap (David Tao album) (Chinese: 太平盛世; pinyin: Tài Píng Chéng Shì)
- "The Great Leap", song by Mortiis
- "The Great Leap", play by Lauren Yee

== See also ==
- Great Leap Forward (disambiguation)
