= The Leap =

The Leap may refer to:

- The Leap, Queensland, a coastal rural locality in the Mackay Region, Queensland, Australia
- The Leap (novel), a 2001 novel by Jonathan Stroud
- The Leap (How I Met Your Mother), an episode of the TV series How I Met Your Mother
- The Divine and the Decay, a 1957 novel by Bill Hopkins., republished as The Leap
- The Leap (film), a 2025 Cuban short film by Roberto Tarazona

== See also ==
- Leap (disambiguation)
