= Leap Day =

Leap day, February 29, is a date added to leap years.

Leap Day may also refer to:

- Leap Day (Hong Kong TV series), a 2020 Hong Kong drama series
- Leap Day (Thai TV series), a Thai mystery thriller television series
- Leap Day (30 Rock), an episode of 30 Rock
- Leap Day (Modern Family), an episode of Modern Family
- Leap Day (video game), a 2016 platform video game

== See also ==
- February 29 (disambiguation)
- Leap year (disambiguation)
