= February 29 (disambiguation) =

February 29 is a calendar day.

It may also mean:

- February 29 (film), a South Korean film
- 29 Februari, a Malaysian film

== See also ==
- Leap Day
- Leap year (disambiguation)
