= Life's a Riot with Spy vs Spy =

1983 studio album by Billy Bragg

Studio album by Billy Bragg
- Released: 1 July 1983
- Recorded: 2–4 February 1983
- Studio: Chappell, Park Street, Mayfair, London
- Genre: British folk rock; folk punk
- Length: 15:57
- Label: Utility; Go! Discs (November 1983)
- Producer: Oliver Hitch

Billy Bragg chronology
Life's a Riot with Spy vs Spy (1983)	Brewing Up with Billy Bragg (1984)

Life's a Riot with Spy vs Spy is the debut album by English singer-songwriter Billy Bragg, released on 1 July 1983 by the Charisma Records imprint Utility.

All songs on the original album consisted of Bragg singing to his electric guitar accompaniment. The album contains both politically charged songs, such as the attack on the school system and unemployment, "To Have and to Have Not", and love songs such as "The Milkman of Human Kindness" and "A New England" (which was later a hit for singer Kirsty MacColl).

The original album played at 45 rpm rather than the more usual 33⅓ rpm, contained only seven songs, and lasted for only 15 minutes and 57 seconds. However, rather than being classified as an EP, it qualified for the UK Albums Chart due to its total number of tracks meeting the rules and reached number 30 in March 1985.

== Background ==
The seven tracks on Life's a Riot with Spy vs Spy were recorded from 2 to 4 February 1983 at Chappell Music's demo studio on Park Street, under the supervision of in-house producer Oliver Hitch. The album was recorded straight to tape, with no mixing undertaken.

The title of the album alludes to Bragg's pseudonym of Spy vs Spy which he used when busking prior to his recording career, and which in turn comes from the strip of the same name in Mad magazine.

== Versions ==
Life's a Riot with Spy vs Spy was released by Utility Records, a newly founded imprint of Charisma Records, on 1 July 1983. The cassette version of the album was recorded on only one side of the tape; the second side of the tape was blank, inscribed with a message that fans should use it for bootlegging. The album was then reissued on 11 November 1983 by the Go! Discs label.

In 1987, the tracks from Life's a Riot with Spy vs Spy, Bragg's second album Brewing Up with Billy Bragg (1984), and his Between the Wars EP (1985) were issued on a compilation album called Back to Basics by Go! Discs. This compilation was reissued by Cooking Vinyl in 1993. Cooking Vinyl released another compilation album in 1996 titled Life's a Riot Between the Wars, which combined the tracks from Life's a Riot with Spy vs Spy and Between the Wars.

In 2006, as part of a series of reissues of albums in Bragg's back catalogue, a remastered edition of Life's a Riot with Spy vs Spy was released, with the original tracks on one disc along with a bonus CD of alternative versions and previously unreleased material. The tracks on the bonus CD were produced and compiled by Grant Showbiz.

In October 2013, to celebrate the 30th anniversary of the original release, a new version was released. This featured the remastered original tracks alongside a live performance of the album which was recorded live at the Union Chapel, London on 5 June 2013.

== Critical reception ==
Professional ratings
Review scores
Source	Rating
AllMusic	4.5/5 stars
Entertainment Weekly	A−
Mojo	4/5 stars
Q	4/5 stars
Record Collector	4/5 stars
Record Mirror	4/5 stars
Rolling Stone	3.5/5 stars
Sounds	3.5/5 stars
Spin Alternative Record Guide	7/10
Uncut	7/10

Record Mirror critic Jim Reid praised Life's a Riot with Spy vs Spy as "the return of the street corner singer-songwriter", writing, "What with everyone searching for the perfect beat in a 112-track studio, it makes a change to hear something so fundamentally pristine ... Ragged and messy perhaps, but the message and story here is pushed so close to the listener that you can almost hear Mr Bragg's heart beat." In Sounds, Garry Bushell likened Bragg to "a busking Paul Weller" and commented that "he ain't gonna make Top of the Pops but at three notes for seven songs, his album's well worth your attention." At the end of 1983, NME listed it as the year's third-best album. Reviewing the record in Spin in 1985, RJ Smith was less enthusiastic, stating that it "will probably fully launch Bragg on the already friendly seas of college radio, and maybe beyond. It deserves a listen. But it's not going to spearhead any 'folk revival' you've read about yesterday or three years ago".

In a retrospective review, AllMusic's Mark Deming wrote that Life's a Riot with Spy vs Spy "captured Bragg in rough but indelible form: the passionate bray of his voice, the noisy report of his electric guitar, and the push and pull between small-p politics and a regular bloke's view of the world were all firmly in place". Writing for Rolling Stone, Douglas Wolk said that the album "slashed through the overwrought pop goop of 1983, not least because it's sixteen minutes long – just Bragg, a distorted guitar and seven wise, bitter assessments of twentysomething existence". In 2013, it was ranked at number 440 on NME's list of "The 500 Greatest Albums of All Time".

== Track listing ==
All songs written by Billy Bragg, except where noted.

1. "The Milkman of Human Kindness" – 2:49
2. "To Have and to Have Not" – 2:33
3. "Richard" – 2:51
4. "A New England" – 2:14
5. "The Man in the Iron Mask" – 2:13
6. "The Busy Girl Buys Beauty" – 1:58
7. "Lovers Town Revisited" – 1:19

Additional tracks on 2006 reissue

1. "Strange Things Happen" (alternative version) – 3:19
2. "The Cloth (1)" – 2:50
3. "Love Lives Here" – 1:42
4. "Speedway Hero" – 2:39
5. "Loving You Too Long" – 2:51
6. "This Guitar Says Sorry" (alternative version) – 2:14
7. "Love Gets Dangerous" (alternative version) – 2:32
8. "The Cloth (2)" – 2:47
9. "The Man in the Iron Mask" (alternative version) – 2:17
10. "A13, Trunk Road to the Sea" (music by Bobby Troup, words by Bragg) – 2:27
11. "Fear Is a Man's Best Friend" (John Cale) – 2:32

Additional tracks (live) on 2013 reissue

1. "Intro" – 0:58
2. "Lovers Town Revisited" – 1:15
3. "To Have and to Have Not" – 2:23
4. "The Busy Girl Buys Beauty" – 2:16
5. "The Man in the Iron Mask" – 2:17
6. "Richard" – 3:09
7. "The Milkman of Human Kindness" – 2:44
8. "A New England" – 3:41

== Personnel ==
Credits are adapted from the album's liner notes.

Original album

- Billy Bragg – vocals, guitar
- Oliver Hitch – production, engineering, recording

2006 reissue

- Dave Woodhead – trumpet on "The Man in the Iron Mask" (alternative version)
- Oliver Hitch – production and recording (original album tracks plus "This Guitar Says Sorry" (alternative version), "Love Gets Dangerous" (alternative version), "The Cloth (2)", "A13, Trunk Road to the Sea", "Fear Is a Man's Best Friend")
- Steve Goldstein – recording ("Strange Things Happen" (alternative version), "The Cloth (1)", "Love Lives Here")
- Wiggy – recording ("Speedway Hero", "Loving You Too Long")
- Grant Showbiz – compiling and production of reissue
- Tim Young – digital remastering (original album tracks)
- Duncan Cowell – digital remastering (bonus tracks)
- Committee – design of reissue

== Charts ==
Chart (1984–1985)	Peak position
New Zealand Albums (RMNZ)	45
UK Albums (OCC)	30

== Certifications ==
Region	Certification	Certified units/sales
United Kingdom (BPI)	Gold	100,000^{^}
^{^} Shipments figures based on certification alone.
