= The Million Things That Never Happened =

Studio album by Billy Bragg
- Released: 8 October 2021
- Studios: Echo Zoo, Eastbourne
- Genres: Alternative rock; folk; Americana; blues
- Length: 46:15
- Label: Cooking Vinyl
- Producers: Romeo Stodart and Dave Izumi

Billy Bragg chronology
Bridges Not Walls (2017)	The Million Things That Never Happened (2021)	The Roaring Forty (1983–2023) (2023)

The Million Things That Never Happened is a 2021 studio album by the English singer Billy Bragg. The title track refers to various social events that could not take place due to lockdowns in the COVID-19 pandemic.

== Background ==
Bragg describes the album as "first pandemic blues album of our times but also a heartfelt paean to human resilience." The album was produced by Romeo Stodart, of the Magic Numbers, with Dave Izumi. The instrumentation includes a 1960s mellotron, which provided a "wonderful kind of woozy, dreamlike sound", according to Bragg.

"To me, it spoke to the ambiguity of lockdown. The ambiguity of not knowing what the future holds — not knowing when we'll go back to what we used to refer to as "normal." So, I kind of liked that sound. I said to Dave, "We should use a little bit more of that to try and evoke that weird feeling, that space where we're not sure if we're going forward or backward.""

The final track, "Ten Mysterious Photos That Can't Be Explained", was co-written with Bragg's son, Jack Valero, after Bragg played him an early draft of the song over Christmas. Valero suggested the inclusion of a middle eight, and reportedly wrote one for the song in half an hour.

== Reception ==
NME reviewed the album as 3 out of 5 stars, describing it as "mellow and empathetic". Americana UK stated that the album was "remarkable" and that it "may be Bragg’s best album so far", adding that he "remains a barb in the side of the establishment".

Iain Key of Louder Than War gave the album a positive review, opining that "those expecting the slightly off-kilter cockney of yesteryear will be disappointed as age has been kind to the singer, his voice seemingly becoming richer with each release", while in The Guardian, Jude Rogers called it "a woozy, melancholic affair, full of Mellotrons, Moogs and resonant Dobro guitars."

Writing for Paste, Eric R. Danton stated that "The Million Things That Never Happened is as contemplative an album as Bragg has released", and that the album "is in many ways subtler and even more subdued than much of his work, but it’s an album that sticks." Nick Hasted, of The Arts Desk, highlighted the track 'Lonesome Ocean', writing: "This sanguine song, sung with a mature balladeer’s voice, shows this album’s qualities: reflective not raw, rueful not raging, an honest evolution from scrappy youth into elder. And there it sits, a little back from the fray, a little too comfortable, but always trying."

== Track listing ==
All tracks are written by Billy Bragg, except where noted.

The Million Things That Never Happened track listing
No.	Title	Length
1.	"Should Have Seen It Coming"	3:23
2.	"Mid-Century Modern"	5:28
3.	"Lonesome Ocean"	3:35
4.	"Good Days and Bad Days"	4:42
5.	"Freedom Doesn't Come for Free"	3:22
6.	"Reflections on the Mirth of Creativity"	3:09
7.	"The Million Things That Never Happened"	3:46
8.	"The Buck Doesn't Stop Here No More"	4:44
9.	"I Believe in You"	3:03
10.	"Pass It On"	3:52
11.	"I Will Be Your Shield"	3:32
12.	"Ten Mysterious Photos That Can't Be Explained" (Billy Bragg and Jack Valero)	3:39
Total length:		46:15

== Personnel ==
- Billy Bragg – acoustic guitar, electric guitar, vocals, whistling, smile
- Romeo Stodart – acoustic guitar, electric, guitar, Wurlitzer, bass, backing vocals, piano, banjo, Univox, Burns Electric
- Dave Izumi – Hammond organ, mellotron, Minimoog, organs, Moog, Univox
- Michele Stodart – backing vocals, bass
- Joe Harvey Whyte – lap steel, pedal steel, banjo, dobro, high strung acoustic
- Darren Beckett – drums, percussion
- Jack Valero – backing vocals, electric guitar
- Maisie Rose Skipper – backing vocals
- Nick Pynn – fiddle, five string violin

== Charts ==
Chart performance for The Million Things That Never Happened
Chart (2021)	Peak position
Australian Albums (ARIA)	98
Scottish Albums (Official Charts)	12
UK Albums (Official Charts)	44
UK Americana Albums (Official Charts)	2
UK Independent Albums (Official Charts)	14
