= One Giant Leap =

One Giant Leap may refer to:

- "That's one small step for [a] man, one giant leap for mankind", the first words of Neil Armstrong on the Moon during Apollo 11
- One Giant Leap (book), a 2019 book about the Apollo program
- 1 Giant Leap, British electronic music duo
  - 1 Giant Leap (album), their first album
- "One Giant Leap", season 1 episode 3 of Heroes
