= Leap year (disambiguation) =

A leap year is a year with an extra day (February 29).

Leap year or leap years may also refer to:

== Art, entertainment, and media ==
=== Films and television ===
- Leap Year (1924 film), American film
- Leap Year (1932 film), British film
- Leap Years, a 2001 drama television series
- Leap Year (2010 film), American film
- Leap Year, an Australian short film by Aaron Wilson (director)
- The Leap Years, 2008 Singaporean film, a.k.a. Leap of Love
- Año bisiesto (Leap Year), 2010 Mexican film directed by Michael Rowe

=== Games ===
- Leap Year (video game), 2024 video game

=== Music ===
- "Leap Year", a song by +/- from Let's Build a Fire, 2005

== See also ==
- Leap Day (disambiguation)
- Leap week
- Leap month
- Leap second
- February 29 (disambiguation)
