= Leap (education and training) =

- Formation: August 2007
- Purpose: Education, training information
- Location: Suffolk
- Region served: Suffolk, United Kingdom
- Affiliations: University of Suffolk, Suffolk Chamber of Commerce
- Website: Leap

Leap was established in 2007 by the University of Suffolk, the Suffolk Learning and Skills Council and Suffolk County Council, with funding from East of England Development Agency.

Leap is unique to Suffolk and delivers free and impartial information and signposting to everyone seeking education or training opportunities. It works with the Suffolk Chamber of Commerce to assist businesses in improving the skills of their workforce.

== Overview ==
Leap partnered with the University of Suffolk and the Suffolk Chamber of Commerce to make web based information on learning, training and skills provision in Suffolk.
