= Leap (Drop Trio album) =

Studio album by Drop Trio
- Released: 2004
- Recorded: February 29, 2004
- Genre: Improvisational experimental jazz
- Length: 61 minutes
- Label: Independent
- Producer: Ian Varley, Nuje Blattel, Nino Batista, John Griffin

Drop Trio chronology
Big Dipper (2003)	Leap (2004)	Cezanne (2005)

Leap is an album by Drop Trio. It was completely improvised by band members Ian Varley (keyboards), Nino Batista (bass), and Nuje Blattel (drums).

== Track listing ==
All tracks are credited to Varley/Blattel/Batista.

1. "Leap"
2. "The Big S.O."
3. "Mothership"
4. "Because Rifles Are Huge"
5. "Anapodyopsis"
6. "Washington's Armies"
7. "Tethered"
8. "Ooog Baby"
9. "The Elements of Argument"
10. "Two Words: Sound"
11. "Robot Suit I"
12. "Robot Suit II"
13. "Robot Suit III"
14. "Leapt"
