= Louisiana Educational Assessment Program =

Standardized tests in Louisiana, United States

The Louisiana Educational Assessment Program (LEAP) is a criterion-reference testing program administered by the state of Louisiana. It is administered to all students from 3rd grade through 8th grade in the subjects of ELA, mathematics, science, and social studies. There are five levels of achievement: Unsatisfactory, Approaching Basic, Basic, Mastery, and Advanced. Advanced is the highest level of achievement, while Unsatisfactory is the lowest. Most schools no longer use the LEAP as the sole component of determining a child's retention or advancement to the next grade. However, a student in the 8th grade who does not score Mastery or higher, may advance to high school, and instead be considered a "T9" or "Transitional 9th Grade" student. The LEAP is administered in spring and the results are during the summer months, typically in July.
