= LEEP Online Education =

LEEP Online Education is a distance learning program offered by the University of Illinois School of Information Sciences (formerly GSLIS [Graduate School of Library and Information Science])

The LEEP program provides students who are not able to relocate to the Urbana-Champaign area a means to attend the university's ALA-accredited Master of Library and Information Science, Master of Information Science or Certificate of Advanced Study (CAS) program. The program, and the iSchool overall, is ranked #1 by U.S. News & World Report.

== History ==
The acronym LEEP originally stood for Library Education Experimental Program. Founded in 1995, the program is no longer considered experimental.

== Coursework ==
LEEP differentiates itself from other distance learning library and information science (LIS) programs through the integration of brief periods of on-campus participation, Internet instruction through synchronous sessions, and independent learning. Off-campus students attend classes via the school's Moodle Virtual Learning Environment (VIS) and the Blackboard Collaborate platform. With the 21st LEEP cohort, beginning in the summer/fall of 2016, the on-campus participation was condensed to a weekend program (as opposed to a week+).
