= Leapfrog (disambiguation) =

Leapfrog is a children's game.

Leapfrog, leap frog or leap-frog may also refer to:

- Leap-Frog (comics), two comic book characters in Marvel Comics
- Leapfrog (comics), a vehicle appearing in Marvel Comics
- Leap Frog (board game)
- Leapfrog appeal, a type of appeal from a lower court directly to a superior court
- Leap Frogs, the United States Navy Parachute Team
- Leapfrogging, a theory of economic development
- Leapfrogging (infantry), an infantry tactic for advancing towards an enemy position
- Leapfrogging (strategy), a military strategy, also called island hopping
- LeapFrog Enterprises, an educational toy company
- Leapfrog Group, a patient safety organization that grades hospitals based on a set of safety criteria
- Leapfrog integration, a method for integrating differential equations
- Leapfrog position, a sexual position
- "Leap Frog (song)", the theme song of Les Brown
- IBM Leapfrog, a prototype tablet computer
- Buster Bennett (1914–1980), American musician nicknamed "Leap Frog"
