= Sexuality (Billy Bragg song) =

Single by Billy Bragg

Single by Billy Bragg

from the album Don't Try This at Home
- Released: September 17, 1991
- Genre: Folk rock
- Length: 3:47
- Label: Elektra
- Songwriters: Billy Bragg, Johnny Marr
- Producers: Grant Showbiz, Johnny Marr

Billy Bragg singles chronology
"She's Got a New Spell" (1988)	"Sexuality" (1991)	"You Woke Up My Neighbourhood" (1991)

Music video
- "Sexuality" (Official Video) on YouTube

"Sexuality" is the ninth track on Billy Bragg's 1991 album, Don't Try This at Home. The song was released as a single which reached No. 27 on the UK charts and No. 2 on the U.S. alternative charts.

"Sexuality" is an anti-homophobia and generally sex-positive song. It was written by Bragg with Johnny Marr, who also plays guitar on the recording. The music video, which was conceived and directed by comedian Phill Jupitus, features Kirsty MacColl singing backing vocals as well as Jupitus himself.

Jupitus has also performed, with Bragg, a parody version of this song named "Bestiality". In November 2021, Bragg created a re-worded version of the song to reflect support for transgender rights.

== Critical reception ==
Upon its release, David Quantick of NME described "Sexuality" as "the funniest and most determined record of the week" and noted the "straightforward and spunky melody". He added, "Bragg goes on marvellously with an absurd storm of rhymes, football teams and paeans to doing it with people of all sexes."

== Personnel ==
- Billy Bragg – vocals
- Johnny Marr – electric guitar, acoustic guitar, keyboards, backing vocals
- Cara Tivey – keyboards
- J. F. T. Hood – drums, percussion
- Amanda Vincent – keyboards
- Jody Linscott – percussion
- Kirsty MacColl – backing vocals
- James Eller – bass

== Charts ==
Chart (1991)	Peak position
UK Singles (Official Charts)	27
UK Airplay (Music Week)	59
US Alternative Airplay (Billboard)	2
