= Johnson Family Vacation =

- Theatrical release poster
- Directed by: Christopher Erskin
- Written by: Earl Richey Jones; Todd R. Jones
- Produced by: Andrew Sugerman; Cedric the Entertainer; Earl Richey Jones; Eric Rhone; Paul Hall; Todd R. Jones; Wendy Park
- Starring: Cedric the Entertainer; Bow Wow; Vanessa Williams; Solange Knowles; Shannon Elizabeth; Steve Harvey
- Cinematography: Jeff Barnett; Shawn Maurer
- Edited by: John Carter
- Music by: Richard Gibbs
- Distributed by: Fox Searchlight Pictures
- Release date: April 7, 2004
- Running time: 97 minutes
- Country: United States
- Language: English
- Budget: $12 million
- Box office: $31.5 million

Johnson Family Vacation is a 2004 American road comedy film directed by Christopher Erskin in his directorial debut. It stars Cedric the Entertainer (dual role), Vanessa Williams, Bow Wow, Gabby Soleil, Shannon Elizabeth, Solange Knowles, and Steve Harvey. The story revolves around the Johnson family going on a road trip to attend a family reunion in Missouri and the numerous hijinks that occur along the way.

The film was released on April 7, 2004, by Fox Searchlight Pictures, and was panned by critics. It marks the feature film debut of Jason Momoa.

== Plot ==
The strict Nate Johnson and his son, aspiring rapper DJ, visit an auto body shop in Los Angeles to pick up the former's Lincoln Navigator, only to discover that it has been mistakenly upgraded with extravagant features. Despite Nate's objections, they are forced to take the customized SUV because they have a family reunion to attend in Caruthersville, Missouri. On their way home, Nate receives a call from his disapproving mother, Glorietta, who criticizes his marriage to his wife, Dorothy. His older brother, Mack, takes over the call, always trying to one-up Nate by appealing to their mother's material desires.

Upon arriving home, it is revealed that Nate and Dorothy are separated, living in separate houses down the street from each other, along with their daughters, Nikki and Destiny. Nikki is preoccupied with her cell phone, while Destiny struggles to retrieve her belongings for her imaginary dog, Sir Barks-a-Lot. Nate disapproves of Dorothy's studying and brings it up when he sees her bringing schoolwork on the road trip. Just as they are about to leave, a man named Stan Turner arrives, claiming to have a reservation for a date with Dorothy. Nate intervenes, asserting his role as Dorothy's husband and scaring Stan away.

The family sets off on their road trip, but soon after, they encounter a dangerous situation on a stretch of highway, with a semi truck attempting to run them off the road. Nate manages to avoid a collision, but the impact causes their suitcases to spill out of the vehicle. Everyone is visibly shaken, but they eventually find a hotel to rest. Dorothy pretends to be interested in reconciling with Nate, but her true motive is to take a break from the trip.

Tensions arise when Nate stops at an Indian casino, mistakenly thinking it is an Indian reservation. Nikki flirts with an Indian tour guide, causing Nate's disapproval. In response, Nate embarrasses Nikki, leading to an argument where he confiscates her cell phone as a punishment.

While on the road, they pick up a hitchhiker named Christelle, against Dorothy's better judgment. Chrishelle steals from Destiny and inadvertently leaves a drug pipe in the backseat. At Bun World for Destiny's birthday celebration, Chrishelle behaves strangely, frightening the family. During their stay at another hotel, Nate and DJ find an alligator named Twinkie in their bed, brought in by Chrishelle. They decide to distance themselves stealthily from her and continue the journey.

DJ eventually needs to relieve himself and urinates in a soda cup, which Nate later throws out of the window, accidentally hitting a police officer on a motorcycle. Nate's inattentiveness leads to a collision with a cement truck, covering the truck in wet cement.

Arrested for littering and possession of drugs (Chrishelle's pipe), the family finds themselves locked up. Dorothy manages to help the officer with his taxes, securing their release. Back on the road, they run out of gas and Nate calls his Uncle Earl for assistance. Earl flirts with Dorothy and attempts to fix the truck using unconventional tools. Eventually, he hauls the truck onto his own and drives them to the family reunion.

At the reunion, Nate's mother criticizes his marriage in front of everyone. However, Dorothy surprises everyone by suggesting they renew their vows. They passionately kiss, and Nate's mother acknowledges Dorothy's worth as a wife. During the festivities, Nate and his family compete with Mack's family for the "Family of the Year" trophy. Nate's family wins with an entertaining performance that includes stealing items for their costumes. Stan, who is revealed to be the semi-truck driver, interrupts the celebration and reveals Nate and Dorothy's separation to the whole family. Nate confesses his shortcomings as a husband, leading to an apology from himself and Glorietta punching Stan. The family decides to leave and head home, as Dorothy has a test.

They head to Earl's auto shop, where to their surprise, Earl has repaired their truck. Upon arriving home in Los Angeles however, the truck immediately falls apart as soon as Nate locks it. Despite the setback, Dorothy reassures Nate, hinting at rekindling their romance. With a smile, Nate follows Dorothy into the house, ready for the next chapter of their relationship.

== Cast ==
- Cedric the Entertainer as:
  - Nathaniel "Nate" Johnson, a strict family dad
  - Earl Johnson, Nate's paternal and lewd uncle
- Vanessa Williams as Dorothy Johnson, Nate's wife
- Solange Knowles as Nicole "Nikki" Johnson, Nate & Dorothy's first daughter, a typical American girl
- Bow Wow as Divirnius James "D.J." Johnson II, Nate & Dorothy's son, a rap fanatic
- Gabby Soleil as Destiny Johnson, Nate & Dorothy's second daughter, who has an imaginary pet dog
- Shannon Elizabeth as Chrishelle Rene Boudreau, a strange young woman who asks for a ride and is involved with drugs and witchcraft
- Steve Harvey as Macarious "Mack" Johnson Sr., Nate's older and popular brother, winner of the annual family contest
- Shari Headley as Jacqueline Johnson, Mack's wife
- Jennifer Freeman as Jill Johnson, Mack & Jacqueline's daughter
- Philip Daniel Bolden as Macarious "Mack Jr." Johnson Jr., Mack & Jacqueline's son
- Aloma Wright as Glorietta Johnson, Nate's and Mack's mother
- Christopher B. Duncan as Stanley "Stan" Turner, Dorothy's college classmate
- Rodney B. Perry as Lump Johnson, Nate's paternal cousin
- Jeremiah "J.J." Williams Jr. as Bodie Johnson, Nate's paternal cousin
- Godfrey as Motorcycle Cop
- Jason Momoa as Navarro, the tour guide for the indigenous casino
- Lee Garlington as Betty Sue, the Bun World waitress
- Lorna Scott as Gladys, the hotel owner
- DeRay Davis as Jamaican Stoner
- Kurupt as Himself
- Tanjareen Martin as Tangerine
- Lichelli Lazar-Lea as Navi Computer (voice)

== Reception ==
On the review aggregator website Rotten Tomatoes, 6% of 88 critics' reviews are positive, with an average rating of 3.4/10. The website's consensus reads: "The poorly crafted Johnson Family Vacation squanders its talented cast in a bland family road comedy that draws unfavorable comparisons to Chevy Chase's Vacation movies." Metacritic, which uses a weighted average, assigned the film a score of 29 out of 100, based on 24 critics, indicating "generally unfavorable" reviews. The critics gave it a "C−" rating at Yahoo! Movies.

Keith Phipps of The A.V. Club criticized the film for being "stitched together with regional stereotypes and gags lifted from other movies". The Austin Chronicle's Marjorie Baumgarten found the humor "half-baked – all setups with few satisfactory payoffs" and the filmmakers' talents lacking in making new and creative comedy set pieces, concluding that "Johnson Family Vacation is as arduous to watch as your neighbor's poorly focused vacation slides." Roger Ebert felt that Cedric's talents were watered down by the film's "paint-by-numbers" script and Erskin's direction having "style without zing", calling it "a routine cross-country comedy that feels exactly like a series of adventures recycled out of every other cross-country comedy." Andy Patrizio of IGN commended Cedric's comedic chemistry alongside Harvey and Williams but felt he didn't work with Shannon's miscast role and the film overall getting bogged down by "a few cases of bathroom humor," concluding that, "[W]hile in the spirit of Vacation, it's not quite on its level. But that shouldn't stop anyone from checking it out on a slow night. I wouldn't make it a top priority rental, but don't dismiss it, either. "

== Sequel ==
On October 18, 2019, The Hollywood Reporter announced that a sequel titled Johnson Family Celebration is in production. Cedric the Entertainer will return to star and produce; DeVon Franklin will co-produce while Michael Elliot (Like Mike, Brown Sugar, Just Wright) will write the screenplay.
