= Talking with the Taxman About Poetry =

1986 studio album by Billy Bragg

Studio album by Billy Bragg
- Released: 22 September 1986
- Recorded: March–July 1986
- Studios: Livingston Studios, Wood Green, London
- Genre: Folk punk
- Length: 38:06
- Labels: Go! Discs (UK); Elektra (US)
- Producers: Kenny Jones, John Porter

Billy Bragg chronology
Brewing Up with Billy Bragg (1984)	Talking with the Taxman About Poetry (1986)	Workers Playtime (1988)

Singles from Talking with the Taxman About Poetry
- 1. "Levi Stubbs' Tears" Released: 1986; 2. "Greetings to the New Brunette" Released: 1986; 3. "Ideology" Released: 1986

Talking with the Taxman About Poetry is the third album by Billy Bragg, released in September 1986. With production by John Porter and Kenny Jones, Talking with the Taxman About Poetry featured more musicians than Bragg's previous works, which were generally little more than Bragg himself and a guitar.

There were two singles released from the album. While "Levi Stubbs' Tears" peaked at No. 29 in the UK, the follow-up "Greetings to the New Brunette" fell short, only managing No. 58 a few months later.

== Background ==
The album's title is also the title of a Vladimir Mayakovsky poem, which appears as part of the liner notes.

The song "There Is Power in a Union" is based on the song "Battle Cry of Freedom".

"Levi Stubbs' Tears" refers to songwriter Barrett Strong, producer Norman Whitfield, the members of the Holland-Dozier-Holland songwriting and production team as well as Levi Stubbs and the Four Tops.

The original album cover has the subtitle "The Difficult Third Album".

== Critical reception ==
Professional ratings
Review scores
Source	Rating
AllMusic	4.5/5 stars
Entertainment Weekly	A
Q	4/5 stars
Record Collector	4/5 stars
Record Mirror	5/5
Rolling Stone	4/5 stars
The Rolling Stone Album Guide	4/5 stars
Smash Hits	7 1/2/10
Spin Alternative Record Guide	8/10
The Village Voice	B+

Reviewing Talking with the Taxman About Poetry for Rolling Stone, David Handelman called the album "a winning mesh, by turns as political as the Clash, as clever as Elvis Costello, as melodic as Ray Davies and as rocking as Chuck Berry." Ira Robbins of Trouser Press praised it as "a great leap forward, the deft application of understated instrumental accompaniment on some of Bragg's best-ever songs."

Talking with the Taxman About Poetry was included in the book 1001 Albums You Must Hear Before You Die.

== Track listing ==
All tracks written by Billy Bragg, except where noted.

=== Disc one ===
1. "Greetings to the New Brunette" – 3:29
2. "Train Train" (Zenon De Fleur) – 2:11
3. "The Marriage" – 2:30
4. "Ideology" (Bragg, Bob Dylan) – 3:27
5. "Levi Stubbs' Tears" – 3:28
6. "Honey, I'm a Big Boy Now" – 4:05
7. "There Is Power in a Union" (Bragg, George Frederick Root) – 2:47
8. "Help Save the Youth of America" – 2:45
9. "Wishing the Days Away" – 2:28
10. "The Passion" – 2:52
11. "The Warmest Room" – 3:55
12. "The Home Front" – 4:09

=== Disc two (2006 reissue) ===
1. "Sin City" (Gram Parsons, Chris Hillman) – 3:34
2. "Deportees" (Woody Guthrie, Martin Hoffman) – 4:03
3. "There is Power in a Union" (instrumental) (George Root) – 3:16
4. "The Tracks of My Tears" (Smokey Robinson, Warren Moore, Marvin Tarplin) – 2:56
5. "Wishing the Days Away" (alternate version) – 2:32
6. "The Clashing of Ideologies" (alternate version) – 2:52
7. "Greetings to the New Brunette" (demo version) – 3:57
8. "A Nurse's Life is Full of Woe" – 2:48
9. "Only Bad Signs" – 3:10
10. "Hold the Fort" (traditional) – 1:47

== Personnel ==
=== Musicians ===
- Billy Bragg – acoustic and electric guitar, vocals
- Kirsty MacColl – vocals on "Greetings to the New Brunette" and "The Passion"
- Ken Craddock – piano on "Honey, I'm a Big Boy Now", organ on "The Warmest Room"
- Kenny Jones – assorted percussion
- Johnny Marr – electric guitar on "Greetings to the New Brunette" and "The Passion"
- Simon Moreton – percussion on "Greetings to the New Brunette" and "Levi Stubbs' Tears"
- John Porter – bass guitar and slide guitar on "Greetings to the New Brunette", bass guitar on "The Marriage" and "The Warmest Room", mandolin on "Help Save the Youth of America" and "Wishing the Days Away"
- George Shilling – assorted percussion
- Bobby Valentino – violin on "Train Train" and "Wishing the Days Away"
- Dave Woodhead – trumpet and flugelhorn on "The Marriage", "Levi Stubbs' Tears" and "The Home Front"
- Hank Wangford – vocals and mandolin on "Sin City" and "Deportees"
- Robert Handley – vocals on "Hold the Fort"

=== Production ===
- Kenny Jones – producer
- John Porter – producer
- Grant Showbiz – reissue producer
- George Shilling – technician
- Pennie Smith – photography
