= Between the Wars (EP) =

1985 EP by Billy Bragg

EP by Billy Bragg
- Released: February 1985
- Genre: Folk punk, protest song
- Label: Go! Discs
- Producer: Kenny Jones

Billy Bragg chronology
Between the Wars (1985)	Days Like These (1985)

Between the Wars is an extended play released by Billy Bragg in 1985. It reached number 15 on the UK Singles Chart.

The title track was inspired by the UK miners' strike (1984–1985). The choice of other songs on the record was also relevant to the dispute - "Which Side Are You On?" is an updated version of the American pro-trade union song of the same title from the 1930s, whilst "It Says Here" (a different recording of the song from the one on Brewing Up with Billy Bragg) is critical of the political bias of British newspapers, most of which opposed the strike.

The proceeds from sales of the record were donated to the striking miners' fund. Bragg said, "Revolutions do not start in record shops. But if you write a song like "Between the Wars", you have to come up with the actions to meet it. I don't claim that the Labour Party has all the answers in the UK, but they took the youth vote for granted in the last election and didn't get it."

All four tracks are available on the 2006 reissue of Brewing Up with Billy Bragg, and the first three tracks (along with the original Brewing Up version of "It Says Here") are also on the Billy Bragg compilation album, Back to Basics.

== Track listing ==
All tracks composed by Billy Bragg; except where indicated

1. "Between the Wars"
2. "Which Side Are You On?" (music by Florence Reece; new lyrics by Billy Bragg)
3. "World Turned Upside Down" (Leon Rosselson)
4. "It Says Here (Different Version)"

== Charts ==
Chart (1985)	Peak position
Ireland (IRMA)	18
UK Singles (OCC)	15
