= A New England =

1983 song by Billy Bragg

Song by Billy Bragg

from the album Life's a Riot with Spy Vs Spy
- Released: 1 July 1983
- Recorded: 2–4 February 1983
- Studio: Chappell Music, London
- Length: 2:14
- Label: Utility
- Songwriter: Billy Bragg
- Producer: Oliver Hitch

"A New England" is a song written and recorded by Billy Bragg, released with his album Life's a Riot with Spy vs Spy in 1983. It remains a signature song from the early years of Bragg's recording career.

In 1985, a cover version by Kirsty MacColl became a hit single.

== Background and composition ==
Bragg borrowed the opening lines of the song ("I was 21 years when I wrote this song/I'm 22 now, but I won't be for long") from Paul Simon's song "Leaves That Are Green", which appears on Simon and Garfunkel's 1966 album Sounds of Silence.

Bragg has said the song had its origins in seeing two satellites flying alongside each other. Searching for romantic inspiration, he had to make do with "space hardware". He told a BBC interviewer he "stole" the melody from Thin Lizzy's "Cowboy Song".

== Kirsty MacColl version ==
"A New England"

Single by Kirsty MacColl
- B-side: "Patrick"; "I'm Going Out with an 80-Year-Old Millionaire"
- Released: 17 December 1984
- Recorded: 1984
- Genre: New wave
- Length: 3:49
- Label: Stiff
- Songwriter: Billy Bragg
- Producer: Steve Lillywhite

Kirsty MacColl singles chronology
"Terry" (1983)	"A New England" (1984)	"He's on the Beach" (1985)

Kirsty MacColl recorded the song the year after its release by Bragg. Her version was produced by her then-husband Steve Lillywhite. Entering the UK chart in 1985, it was her biggest solo hit, reaching number 7 in the UK Singles Chart and number 8 in the Irish Singles Chart.

Bragg's original version of the song had only two verses. MacColl thought the song was too short, and so Bragg wrote a further verse for her. The line in the chorus "I'm just looking for another girl" becomes a question: "Are you looking for another girl?" Since MacColl's death, Bragg has included the additional verse in performances of the song as a tribute.

The recording of "A New England" was the first collaboration between MacColl and her husband Steve Lillywhite on one of her own solo recordings.

=== Background ===
MacColl discovered Bragg in 1983 when she went to see one of his live performances. One of the songs Bragg played was "A New England", which MacColl immediately identified as having hit potential. MacColl told Smash Hits in 1985, "I always thought 'A New England' would be great with loads of harmonies, it's such a good melody. Billy does it in a very rough way, and it's like a busker doing a really good Beatles song." She added to Gilbert Blecken in 1994, "I knew the song was fantastic, but [Bragg's] version was just the skeleton of the song, so I wanted to dress it up."

=== Music video ===
MacColl recalled to Record Mirror in 1985, "It was hell making the video, I was seven months pregnant and it was shot out in the freezing cold."

=== Critical reception ===
On its release, Richard Cook of New Musical Express wrote, "Bragg's 'A New England' proves to be a skimming and vivacious vehicle for MacColl and the song checks for the pop sense of composer and singer; but Lillywhite's production might be too clever where it needs a simple stroke, unassuming when it needs to strike clear and hard." Mike Gardiner of Record Mirror stated that MacColl had "admirably tenderised the Billy Bragg original without weakening one of last year's better love songs". He noted the "smart production", the "Byrds-style 12-string guitar backing" and "some velvet choral effects". Frank Edmonds of the Bury Free Press gave the single a 6 out of 10 rating. He described it as a "fast, bright pop song", but did not believe it would become a hit. Bill Black of Sounds was negative in his review, noting that MacColl and Lillywhite were "not content to stick with the anorexic arrangement" of Bragg's original, but opted to "feed the song up with a crippling bpm and at least two skyward leaps at a change of mood". He felt the result had "come down hard on a simple tale that asks only to be told, not trampled underfoot by an over-fed mix".

=== Track listing ===
==== 7-inch and picture disc ====
Side A
No.	Title	Writer(s)	Length
1.	"A New England"	Billy Bragg	3:51

Side B
No.	Title	Writer(s)	Length
2.	"Patrick"	Kirsty MacColl	3:07

==== 12-inch ====
Side A
No.	Title	Writer(s)	Length
1.	"A New England (Extended Version)"	Bragg	7:56

Side B
No.	Title	Writer(s)	Length
2.	"Patrick"	MacColl	3:07
3.	"I'm Going Out with an Eighty Year Old Millionaire"	MacColl	2:52

=== Charts ===
Chart (1985)	Peak position
Ireland (IRMA)	8
Netherlands (Tipparade)	10
Sweden (Sverigetopplistan)	18
UK Singles (Official Charts)	7

Chart (2013)	Peak position
UK Physical Singles	56
