= Greetings to the New Brunette =

1986 single by Billy Bragg

Single by Billy Bragg

from the album Talking with the Taxman about Poetry
- Released: 1986
- Genre: Rock
- Label: Go! Discs
- Songwriter: Billy Bragg
- Producer: John Porter

"Greetings to the New Brunette" is a song by Billy Bragg from the 1986 album Talking with the Taxman About Poetry. It was the second single from the album, following "Levi Stubbs' Tears", and reached No. 58 on the UK Singles Chart in October 1986. The song features Johnny Marr on electric guitar, and vocals by Kirsty MacColl.

It was voted number 38 on the 1989 Triple J Hottest 100 poll of most popular songs by the listeners of the Australian radio station Triple J and number 59 on the 1990 Triple J Hottest 100 poll. The song was selected by actor David Tennant as one of his Desert Island Discs in 2009.

== Charts ==
Chart (1986–1987)	Peak position
New Zealand (Recorded Music NZ)	6
UK Singles (Official Charts)	58
