= Levi Stubbs' Tears =

1986 single by Billy Bragg

Single by Billy Bragg

from the album Talking with the Taxman about Poetry
- Released: 1986
- Genre: Rock
- Label: Go! Discs
- Songwriter: Billy Bragg
- Producer: John Porter

Billy Bragg singles chronology
"Days Like These" (1985)	"Levi Stubbs' Tears" (1986)	"Greetings to the New Brunette" (1986)

"Levi Stubbs' Tears" is a song by Billy Bragg. It was the first single released from Bragg's 1986 album Talking with the Taxman about Poetry. The song's title refers to the Four Tops lead singer Levi Stubbs, whose music remains a source of comfort to the protagonist through years of abandonment, injury, and domestic violence.

A live version of the song performed by skinhead punk-soul band the Redskins appeared on the miners' strike benefit EP Wake Up! in 1987.

A guitar riff from the song was sampled by Norman Cook and featured in his 1989 song "Won't Talk About It", also featuring Billy Bragg on "falsetto soul" vocals. When Cook formed Beats International they released their own hit version of the song in 1990 without the guitar riff sample.

In 2014, NME ranked it at number 207 in their list of The 500 Greatest Songs of All Time.

== Track listing ==
All tracks composed by Billy Bragg; except where indicated

1. "Levi Stubbs' Tears"
2. "Between the Wars" (live)
3. "Think Again" (Dick Gaughan)
4. "Walk Away Renée" (Bob Calilli, Michael Brown, Tony Sansone)

== Charts ==
Chart (1986)	Peak position
New Zealand (Recorded Music NZ)	11
UK Singles (Official Charts)	29
