= Waiting for the Great Leap Forwards =

1988 single by Billy Bragg

- UK EP cover

Single by Billy Bragg

from the album Workers Playtime
- B-side: "Wishing the Days Away"; "Sin City"
- Released: 30 August 1988
- Genre: Folk punk
- Length: 4:32
- Label: Go! Discs
- Songwriter: Billy Bragg

Billy Bragg singles chronology
| "She's Leaving Home" (1988) | "Waiting for the Great Leap Forwards" (1988) | "She's Got a New Spell" (1988) |

"Waiting for the Great Leap Forwards" is a 1988 song by English singer/songwriter Billy Bragg. The song was released as an advance single from the album Workers Playtime on 30 August 1988. Bragg was accompanied on the original recording by Martin Belmont, Bruce Thomas, Cara Tivey, Mickey Waller and Bragg's long-standing roadie Wiggy, with backing vocals by Michelle Shocked and Phill Jupitus among others. The recording was produced by Joe Boyd with Wiggy. The single had two songs on the b-side: a re-recording of Bragg's "Wishing the Days Away" featuring Tivey, and a cover of the Flying Burrito Brothers' "Sin City" featuring Hank Wangford, both produced by John Porter and Kenny Jones.

== Lyrics ==
Written after the disillusionment of the 1987 general election, Bragg describes "Great Leap Forwards" as "my way of owning up to the ambiguities of being a political pop star while stating clearly that I still believed in Sam Cooke's promise that a change was gonna come". According to Bragg's biographer Andrew Collins, the song "pulls off the difficult trick of boiling down the whole pop-and-politics-don't-mix argument", one that Bragg, as a left-wing singer/songwriter would often have had. The first two verses mention the "Camelot" of the John F. Kennedy administration, post-revolution Cuba, the Soviet Union and Robert Oppenheimer. The "Cheese Pavilion" where Bragg is interviewed by a fanzine writer in the third and fourth verses is at the Royal Bath and West Showground near Shepton Mallet, where Bragg had played on 1 February 1987. The remainder of the song describes the day-to-day business of political activism: fundraising, distributing pamphlets, risking unemployment, culminating in the tongue-in-cheek rallying cry of "the revolution is just a t-shirt away!" Collins credits the song as "featuring some of Billy's most memorable lines".

== Releases ==
The single reached number 52 on the UK singles charts on 10 September 1988. Go! Discs pressed a "DJ edit" promo with the first verse removed without Bragg's prior knowledge and to his subsequent displeasure. As well as the UK release from Go! Discs there were releases in Australia and New Zealand on Liberation Records and in Germany on Line Records. Elektra Records in the USA produced a 12" promo.
