= La Sape =

Sartorial subculture centered on the Congolese cities of Kinshasa and Brazzaville

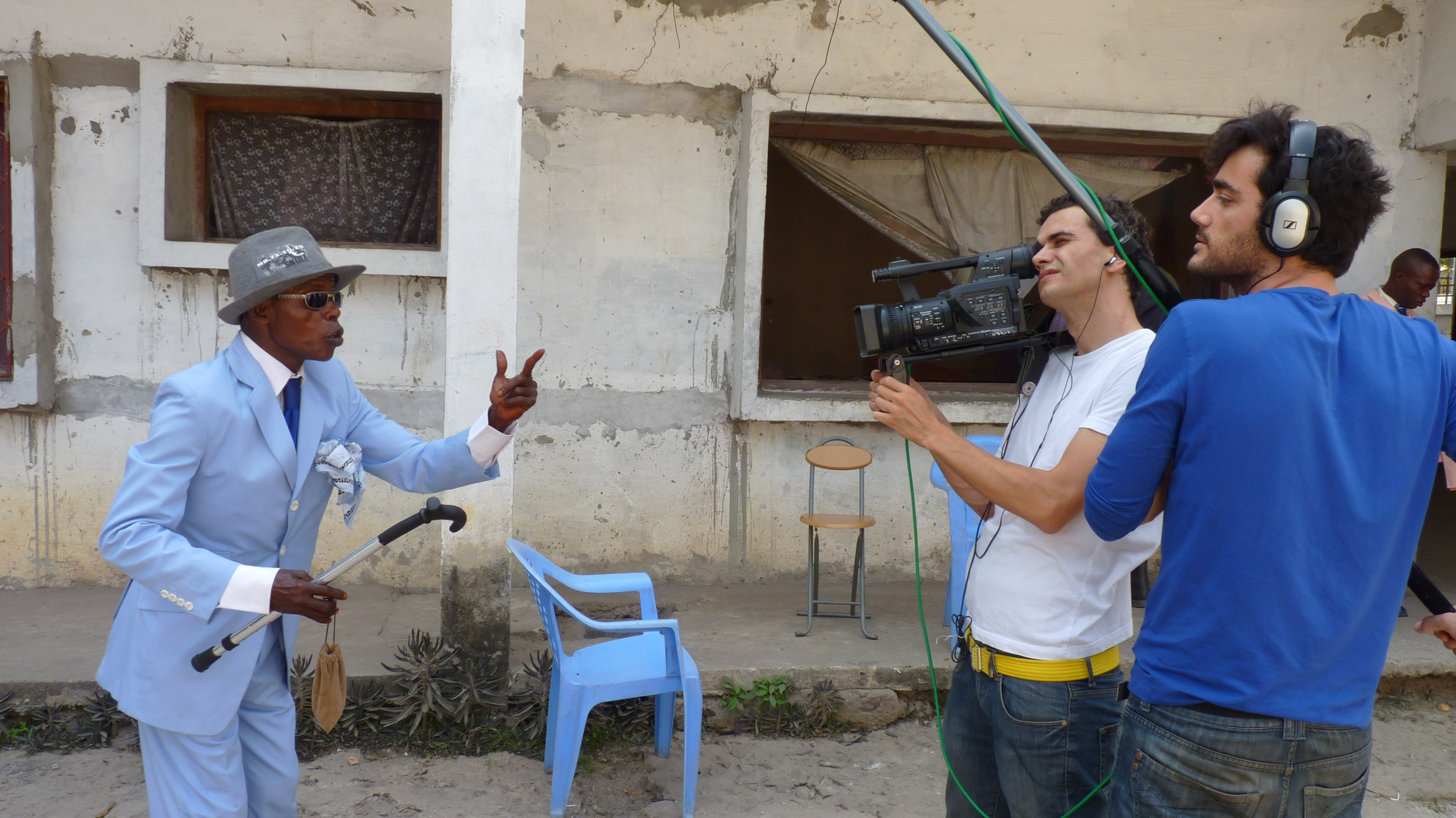
- A Brazzaville sapeur being interviewed by Spanish filmmakers for the 2010 documentary Dimanche à Brazzaville
- Years active: 1920s–present
- Country: Republic of the Congo and Democratic Republic of the Congo

La Sape, an abbreviation based on the phrase Société des Ambianceurs et des Personnes Élégantes (French; literally "Society of Ambiance-Makers and Elegant People") and hinting to the French slang word sape which means "clothes" or sapé, which means "dressed up", is a subculture centered on fashion, elegance, and public performance that originated among Congolese communities in the cities of Kinshasa and Brazzaville in the Democratic Republic of the Congo and Republic of Congo respectively. An adherent of La Sape is known as a sapeur or, if female, as a sapeuse. The movement embodies the elegance in style and manners of colonial predecessor dandies. The philosophy of La Sape is based on ten fundamental "commandments" that govern the behavior of sapeurs and summarize the principles of the movement.

Several "founding myths" have been developed by sapeurs to explain the movement's origins. The first links La Sape to the precolonial Kingdom of Kongo and is based on historical accounts that describe a royal court where aspects of Portuguese dress were adopted during the 16th century. A second founding myth centers on Camille Diata, who frontlined the La Sape movement in Brazzaville during the 1930s and later influenced Congolese communities in France. Diata was also part of L'Amicale, "a loosely organized anti-colonial movement", formed in France in 1926 by the Congolese anti-colonial activist André Matsoua. The group mainly helped Africans arriving in Paris, many of whom faced discrimination, imprisonment, and deportation. After Matsoua died in 1942, his political ideas became more influential in the Congo and were later adopted by members of the Congolese educated elite. They combined his anti-colonial views with a strong interest in fashion, and this movement gradually became associated with the Kongo and Lari people and developed strong political and cultural symbolism. The third founding myth emerged among Congolese migrants in France and centers on Christian Loubaki, a worker from Brazzaville employed in Paris.

The 1950s gave rise to the cosmopolitan, bringing prominence to the music scene. Nightclubs and beer halls hosted the music and young urbanites of the Congolese townships of Kinshasa and Brazzaville. During the postcolonial years, the unique dynamics of La Sape coalesced in 1960 when both Congos were granted independence. Economic chaos ensued and many were left jobless. This caused numerous Congolese people to move abroad to western cities like London and Paris. Since they were also not very welcome, La Sape acted as refuge for them to cope with European life. The movement also developed alongside Congolese rumba and soukous music, whose performers regularly praised elegance, designer fashion, and famous sapeurs. Among the most influential figures was Papa Wemba, whose help is credited with reviving La Sape in Kinshasa during the 1970s by emphasizing the importance of smartly dressed Congolese men.

Many scholars view La Sape as a form of social expression rather than simply a style of dress. Sapeurs often reworked clothing and symbols associated with power, giving them new meanings. For many participants in Congo and abroad, fashion became a way to claim respect, express individuality, and gain recognition despite difficult social and economic conditions. Because of this, La Sape is often seen as a fashion movement and a response to social and political changes. Sapeurs participate in fashion shows, street processions, social gatherings, and the danse des griffes ("dance of the labels"), where they display designer labels and clothing details through coordinated movements. They are also known for the diattance, a distinctive walking style that emphasizes confidence and elegance. Since the late twentieth century, La Sape has received growing international attention through photography, cinema, media coverage, academic research, and popular culture.

== Culture and practices ==
=== Language and terminology ===
The acronym SAPE (Société des Ambianceurs et des Personnes Élégantes, or "Society of Ambiance-Makers and Elegant People") reflects the colonial administration's frequent use of acronyms and the French slang word sape, meaning clothing. It also evokes the military term sape, which refers to weakening a structure from below. This type of wordplay became an important part of the movement. Sapé is the past participle of the verb saper, and in slang means well dressed, smartly dressed, or dressed up. A member of La Sape is called a sapeur, while a female member is known as a sapeuse. Beyond fashion, sapeurs reshaped the language inherited from colonial administration in much the same way that they adapted clothing styles. They also created new words such as sapologie ("sapology"), griffologie ("labelology"), and vestimentologie ("clothology" or "the study of dress"), which treated fashion as a field of study while playfully imitating scholarly language. The term sapelogie refers to the philosophy, codes, and practices associated with La Sape, while a sapelogue is a practitioner or follower of sapelogie.

French researcher Manuel Charpy argued that La Sape is therefore not limited to dress and appearance. According to him, the movement's vocabulary is creative, multilingual, and constantly evolving. Through puns, titles, acronyms, and newly coined words, sapeurs used language as another form of self-expression to challenged traditional authority and propped the movement's emphasis on creativity, style, and cultural renewal.

=== Ten commandments ===
The philosophy of La Sape is accompanied by ten fundamental "commandments" that govern the behavior of sapeurs and summarize their values.

No.	Commandment
1.	You shall practice La Sape on earth among people and in heaven with your Creator God.
2.	You shall outshine the ngayas (those who lack knowledge), the nbéndés (the ignorant), and the tindongos (those who speak without purpose) on earth, underground, at sea, and in the heavens.
3.	You shall honor sapology in every place.
4.	The ways of sapology are unfathomable to any sapelogue who does not understand the rule of three and the trilogy of completed and incomplete colors.
5.	You shall never give up.
6.	You shall maintain strict standards of dress and personal hygiene.
7.	You shall be neither tribalist, nationalist, racist, nor discriminatory.
8.	You shall be neither violent nor disrespectful.
9.	You shall obey the principles of civility observed by sapelogues and show respect for your elders.
10	Through your devotion and these Ten Commandments, you, as a sapelogue, shall convert the peoples who are hostile to La Sape.

=== Styles ===
==== Danse des griffes ====
Danse des griffes ("dance of the labels") is a performance in which sapeurs display designer labels, luxury garments, and clothing details through stylized gestures: raising the knee to reveal branded socks, unbuttoning jacket sleeves to show labels and openings, and accentuating luxury garments through choreographed movements. It was popularized among sapeurs in Paris during the 1980s.

==== Diattance ====
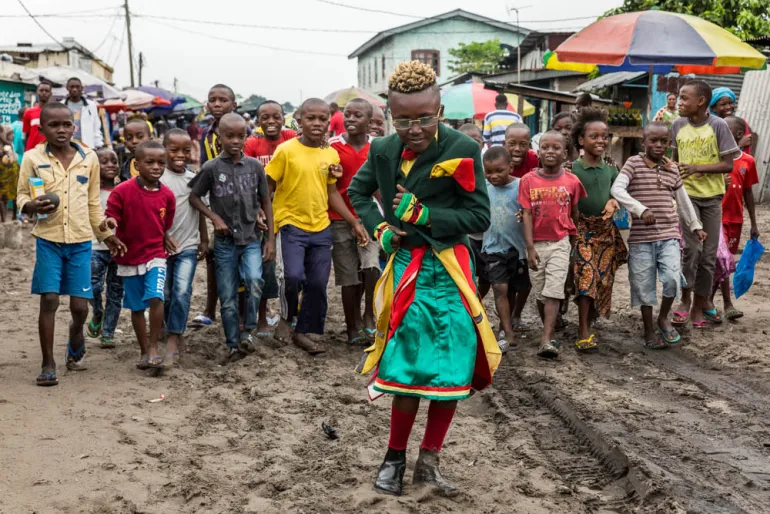
A young sapeur from the Republic of the Congo taking part in a street parade

Diattance is a stylized walking practice characterized by slow, deliberate movements, distinctive poses, or exaggerated gestures. Some sapeurs walked with their heads held high, their necks stretched, or their feet positioned distinctively. The practice originated in Brazzaville and Léopoldville (now Kinshasa) during the 1920s and was intended to set them apart from ordinary workers and pedestrians. By the 1970s, diattance had become a recognized feature of sapeur culture and was commonly performed in streets, markets, bars, and nightclubs. The practice later spread to Paris, where Congolese sapeurs turned sidewalks and public spaces into informal fashion runways through which they display their clothing, confidence, and personal style.

=== Style beyond seasons and climate, adventurers ===
Being "against time" became a key idea in La Sape. In a 1986 Vogue article, a young man from the Poto-Poto area of Brazzaville described the philosophy of the sapeurs with the phrase, "We are against time". This reflected a fashion style that challenged normal ideas about seasons and location, as sapeurs regularly wore clothes that did not match the weather, such as light linen outfits during cold Paris winters and thick wool or leather clothing in the tropical heat of Central Africa.

This practice had a long history. Since the late 1800s, European colonial officials often criticized Congolese men who wore tweed suits, felt hats, and other formal European clothing despite the equatorial heat. Colonial ideas about "hygienic dress" encouraged practical clothing for tropical climates and generally discouraged Africans from following changing fashion trends. During the 1980s, sapeurs continued to challenge these ideas by wearing clothing that ignored seasonal expectations. Similar behavior could also be seen in other youth groups, such as zoot suiters and punks, who often dressed the same way regardless of the weather. For Congolese sapeurs, however, this style also expressed a cultural connection between Central Africa and Europe.

This tradition can be traced back to the 1930s. Congolese sailors and workers returning from European ports such as Antwerp and Le Havre often kept wearing winter clothes after coming home. Because of this, they were called trop-chauds, meaning "too-hot ones". They commonly wore wool trousers, sweaters, and other clothing linked to colder climates. These outfits reminded others of their experiences overseas, but some people criticized the trend. Certain Congolese figures connected to the colonial administration argued that the trop-chauds were copying Europeans, seeking expensive goods, and wearing clothing that was unsuitable for the African environment.

This attitude could be seen among the Adventurers (migrants who traveled to France in search of social status and recognition through fashion prestige) in Paris, who wore linen Bermuda shorts and colonial helmets during winter. Meanwhile, in Brazzaville and Kinshasa, they favored wool suits and other clothing connected to colder European weather. Because of this, observers described their wardrobe as a permanent "cruise collection". Their appearance was also distinguished by wearing sunglasses in nightclubs and by the practice known as réglages, which focused on carefully matching clothing, colors, and accessories. Watches signaled social status and modernity. In 1947, a researcher reported that many educated unemployed men in Brazzaville wore broken watches, dark glasses, and visible pen caps to show elegance and status. By the 1980s, simply pulling out and checking a pocket watch in public had become part of the performance, even when the watch no longer worked.

=== Brand culture ===
Although sapeurs often included traditional accessories in their outfits, they also showed a strong interest in modern luxury fashion and designer brands. Some accessories, such as tobacco-free pipes, were worn mainly for style rather than practical use. As luxury ready-to-wear fashion became more popular during the 1970s and 1980s, designer labels gained greater importance within sapeur culture. Fashion journalist Michel Cressole noted that sapeurs admired established designers such as Yves Saint Laurent, Emanuel Ungaro, and Adolfo Dominguez, while also embracing newer fashion houses, including Marithé + François Girbaud, Giorgio Armani, Gianni Versace, Jean-Paul Gaultier, and Lucien Foncel. Other favored brands included Comme des Garçons, Yohji Yamamoto, Thierry Mugler, Claude Montana, Daniel Hechter, Marcel Lassance, Façonnable, and J. M. Weston. Accessories and clothing from designers such as Yves Saint Laurent, Azzedine Alaïa, Giorgio Armani, Guy Laroche, and Nino Cerruti became important signs of style and social status.

This preference for imported clothing had existed for decades. Since the 1920s, many Congolese dandies preferred clothing brought directly from Europe and often rejected second-hand garments or clothes made by local tailors. Designer labels gradually came to represent quality, authenticity, and the financial ability to buy imported luxury goods. Some scholars have explained this focus on brands through the idea of commodity fetishism, arguing that the value of luxury fashion often came more from the label than from the work involved in making the clothing. Some sapeurs wore jackets inside out so that labels could be seen or left price tags attached to emphasize the brand prestige. In some cases, prominent sapeurs even adopted the names of famous designers, such as Yves Saint Laurent and Serge Smalto, as personal nicknames.

=== Fashion knowledge and media ===
While fashion change is often associated with youth culture and socially marginal groups, the clothing practices of sapeurs were often overlooked in academic studies of fashion and dress. Earlier studies generally treated clothing as material culture and paid less attention to connection with daily experiences. Later scholars, including Farid Chenoune, helped expand discussions about the social and cultural meanings of dress.

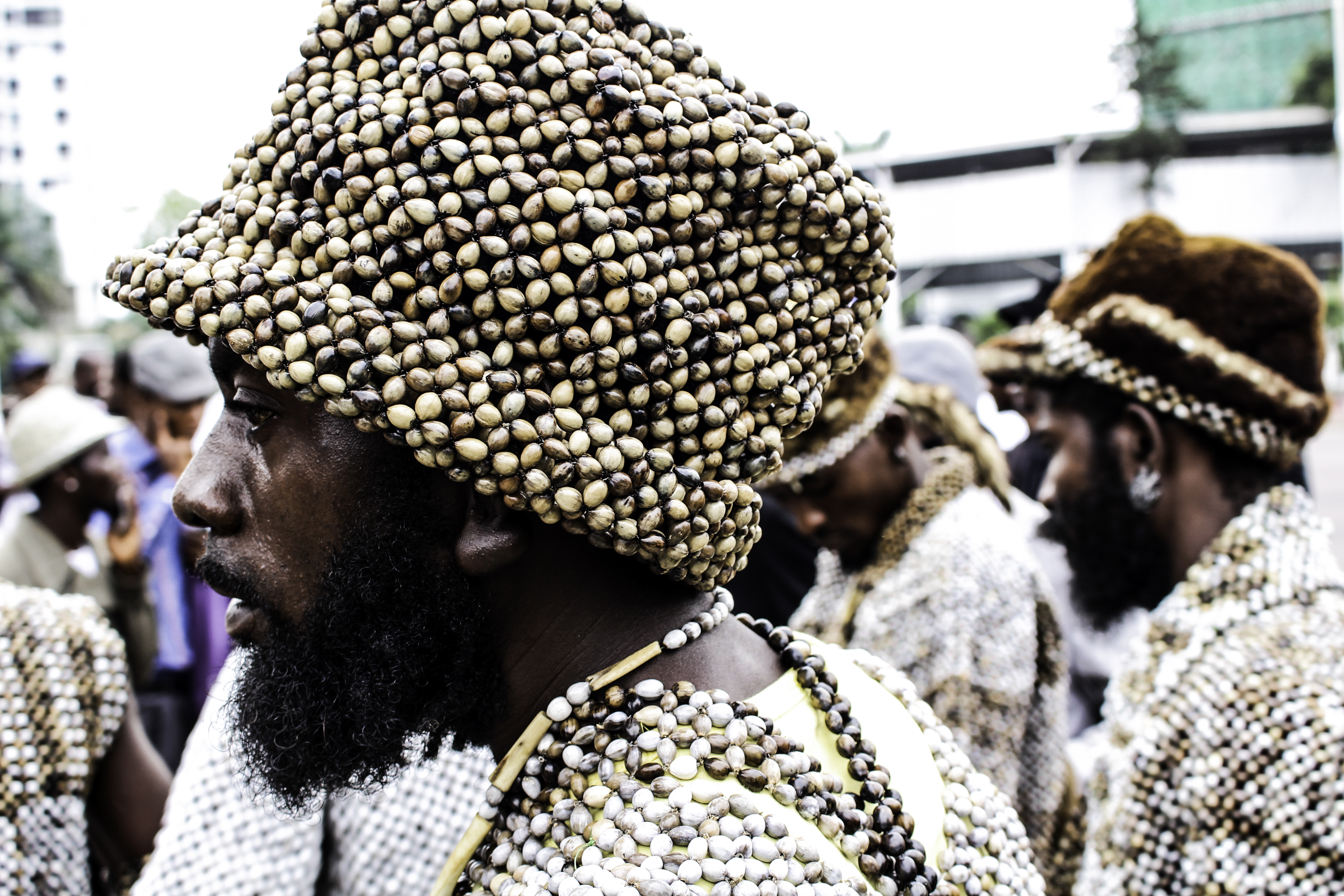
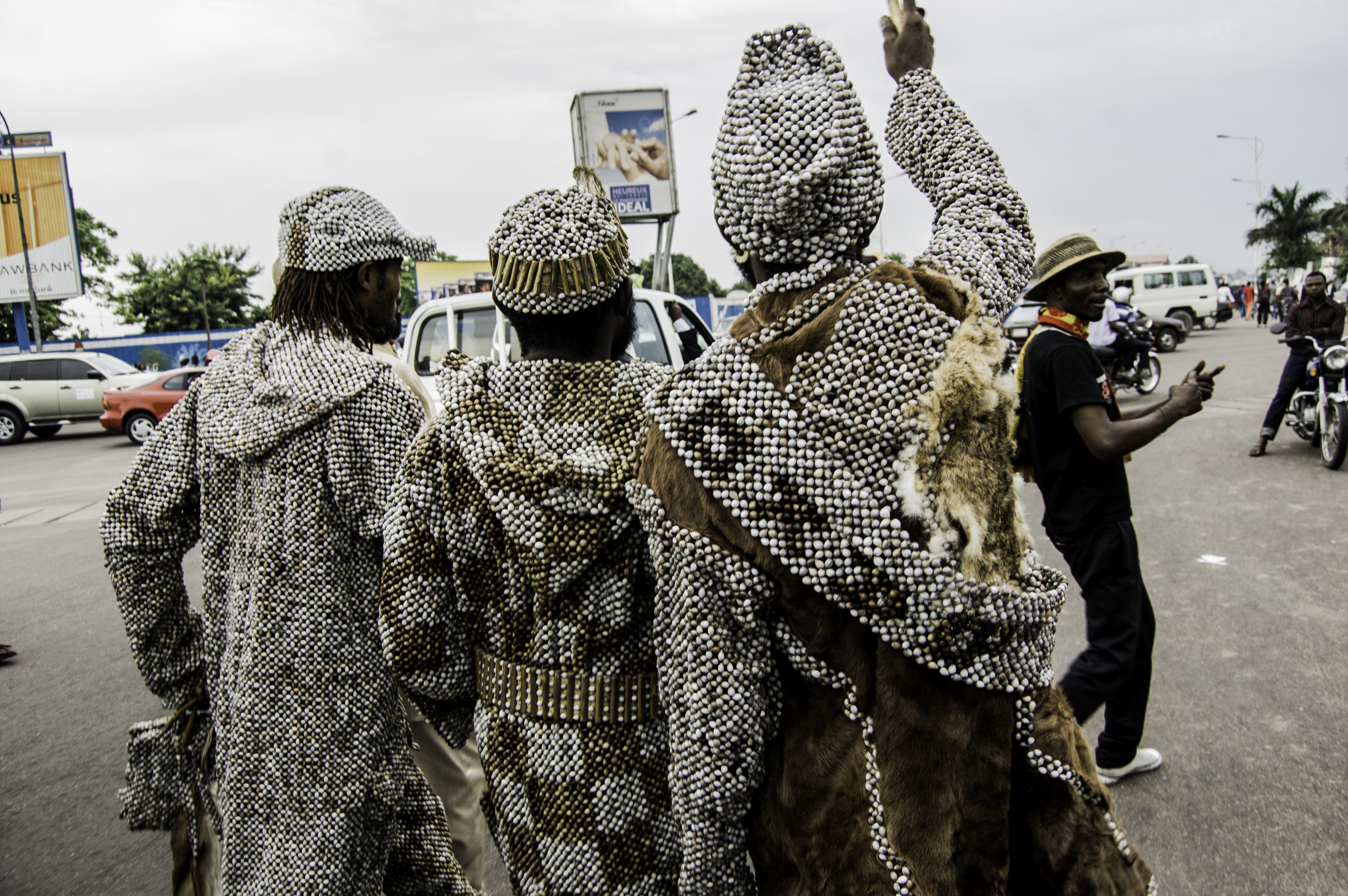
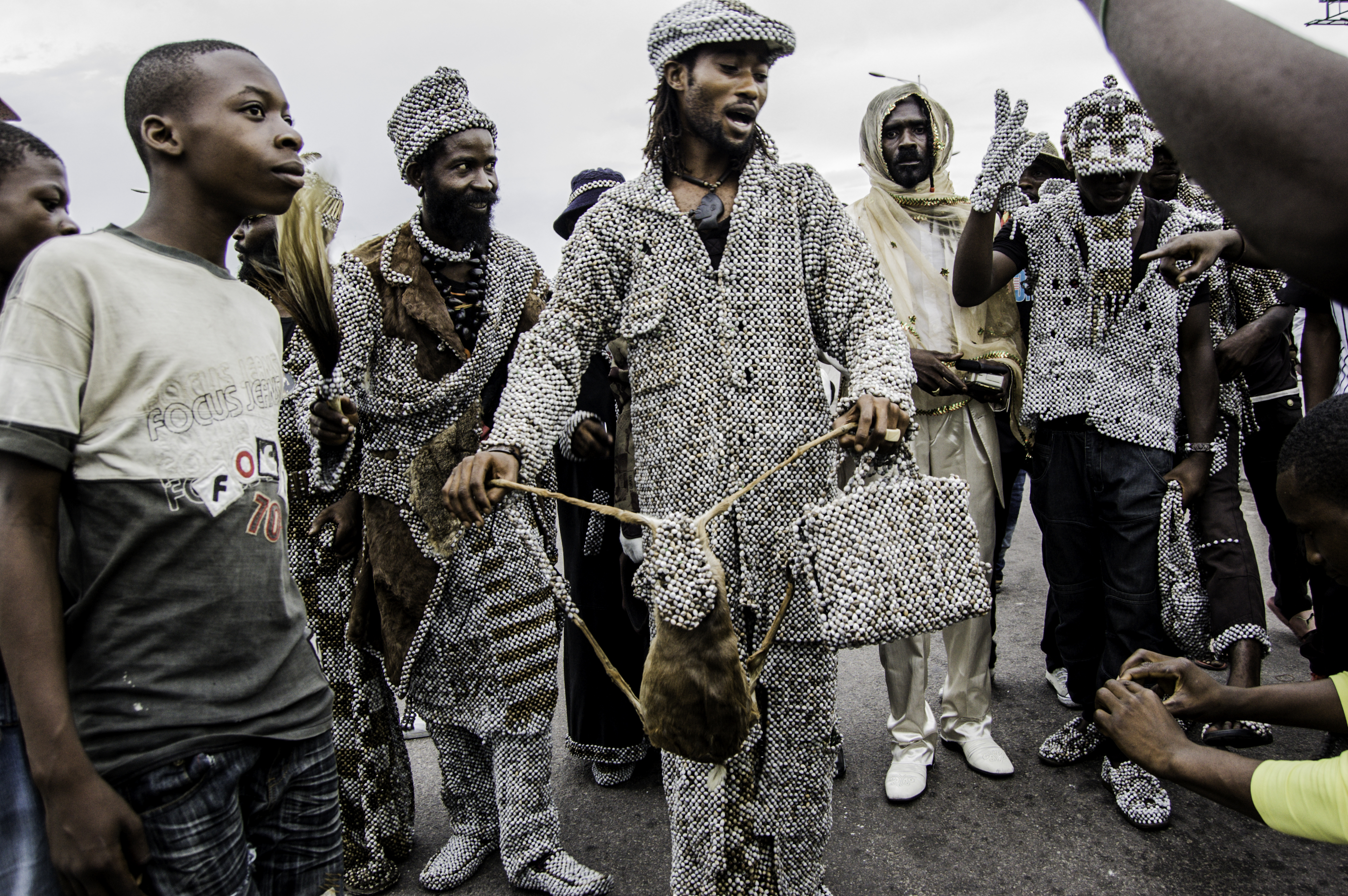
Sapeurs in Kinshasa wearing a traditional outfit featuring intricate beadwork, alloy accents, and animal hides, inspired by cultural practices of Kongo Central

Interest in European fashion among Congolese consumers had existed for many years. Since the nineteenth century, merchants in Central Africa reported strong demand for imported goods that reflected the latest European styles. European retailers adjusted their products to match local tastes through correspondence and specially selected merchandise. Reports from the Belgian colonial administration during the 1920s also recorded changing fashion preferences among Congolese consumers. These reports noted the popularity of items such as knitted silk ties and zephyr shirts, while other products, including cloth-top shoes, became less popular over time.

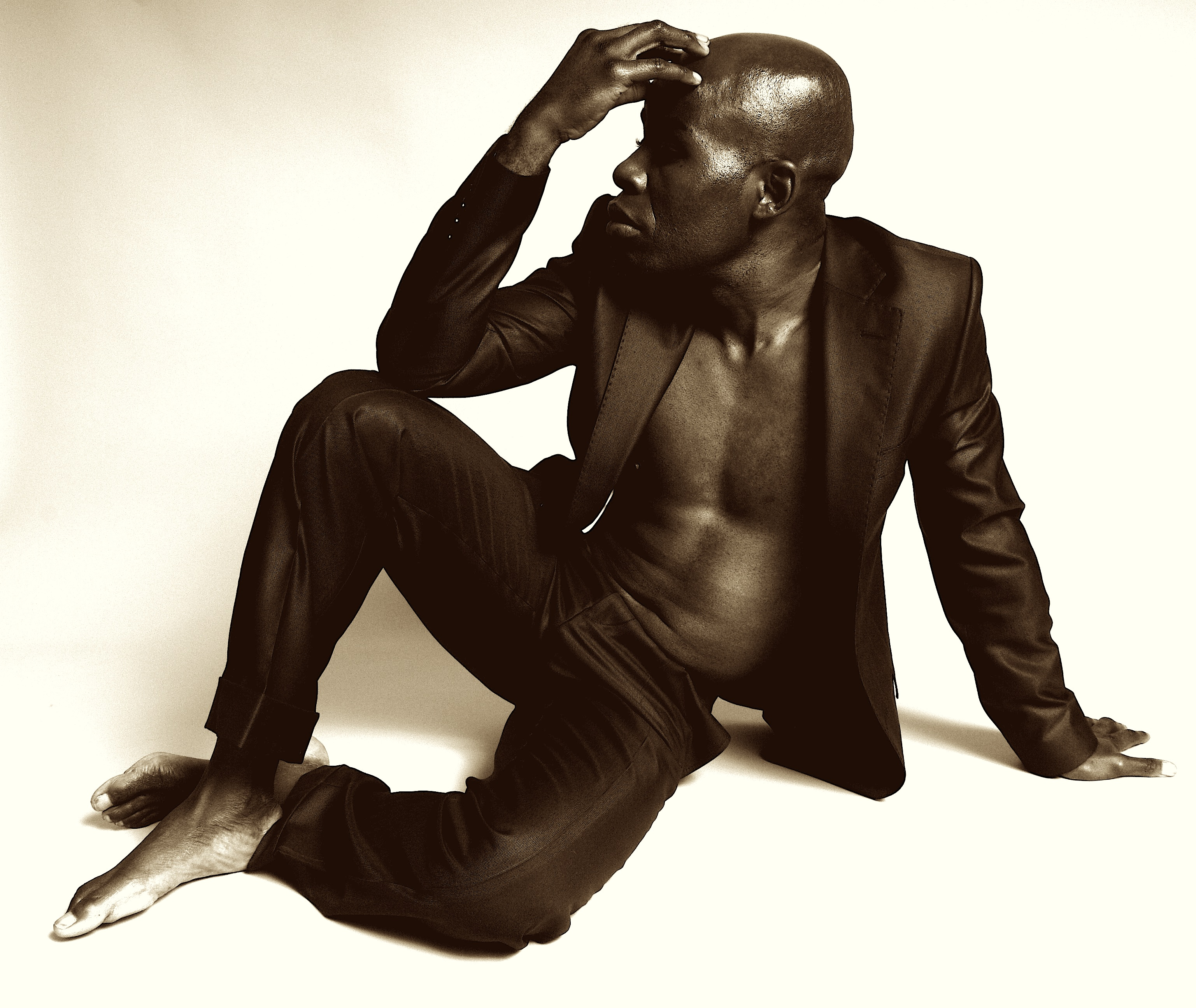
Congolese musician Bantunani (born Michel Nzau Vuanda) in a promotional photograph by Raphaël Delorme for Africanization, associated with the birth of the "Dandy Dansant" concept.

Fashion information spread through several channels, especially mail-order catalogs. During the colonial period and throughout the twentieth century, European catalogs gave consumers access to new fashions and products. Companies such as Saint-Étienne became well known among Congolese consumers, while later generations of sapeurs followed catalogs produced by Quelle, Les Trois Suisses, and La Redoute. Fashion magazines played a similar role. Many sapeurs in the 1960s and 1970s collected magazines such as Salut les copains! and used fashion advertisements as guides for developing their own style.

Films and television offered important sources of inspiration. New trends reached Congolese audiences through Paris cinemas and later through local VHS screenings in Congo. Some sapeurs modeled their appearance on film characters, television personalities, and public figures. In interviews conducted during the 1980s, several sapeurs cited actors, journalists, and political leaders among their style influences, including French television presenter Yves Mourousi and political figures such as Jimmy Carter, François Mitterrand, and Valéry Giscard d'Estaing, whose public "appearances and clothing styles were closely followed by fashion-conscious audiences in Kinshasa".

== History ==
=== Origins and dress practices ===
French researcher Manuel Charpy, a specialist in the history of clothing at the CNRS and director of the CNRS-INHA InVisu Laboratory, noted that sapeurs built a historical narrative of La Sape based on three "founding myths". The first traces its roots to the precolonial Kingdom of Kongo before its decline after the Kingdom of Portugal's involvement and the Atlantic slave trade. Using European accounts from the sixteenth century, sapeurs pointed to descriptions of a Christian royal court where the king reportedly wore Portuguese-style clothing and rarely repeated the same outfit. This connection allowed them to present La Sape as a practice with deep local roots rather than a foreign influence. The work of sociologist Georges Balandier, later expanded by Justin Gandoulou, helped spread this view.

The second founding myth connects La Sape to the colonial period and the struggle against colonial rule. In this version, sapeurs identify with André Matswa, a Congolese activist and former soldier who is said to have kept wearing his uniform while campaigning for citizenship rights. After traveling to Paris in the late 1920s and creating an organization that opposed colonial authorities, Matswa was imprisoned and later died in custody. The third myth developed mainly among Congolese migrants in France. It centers on Christian Loubaki, a worker from Brazzaville employed in Paris's 16th arrondissement, whose employer allegedly joked that his stylish appearance would "sape" the morale of his friends. This narrative gradually came to represent ideas of social competition and class differences that became important parts of sapeur culture.

These founding narratives are supported by a series of symbolic "sites of memory" by the movement. Examples include portraits of André Matswa carried in processions, the grave of Édouard-Théophile Blanchard, founder of the French shoemaker J. M. Weston, and places associated with Congolese migrant communities in Paris. One of the best-known sites was the Maison des Étudiants du Congo (MEC) on Rue Béranger. Often called the movement's "Mecca", it became a gathering place where many Congolese migrants lived rent-free and helped sustain the social networks of La Sape. Burial sites also became meaningful symbols, and in Congo, where clothing and textiles have long played a role in funeral traditions, graves became places where sapeurs honored important figures. Since 1995, they have met annually on 10 February at the grave of Stervos Niarcos, a Congolese pop star and one of the Democratic Republic of the Congo's most famous dandies, for commemorations that include music, dancing, and references to prominent fashion brands.

During the 1970s and 1980s, sapeurs increasingly used fashion to challenge political controls on clothing. In Brazzaville, although government restrictions became less strict over time, the administration of Denis Sassou Nguesso strengthened organizations such as the popular militia, which sometimes monitored and oppressed sapeurs. At the same time, the Union de la Jeunesse Socialiste Congolaise (UJSC) required students to wear uniforms. Many sapeurs felt these policies limited personal freedom. According to sapeur Séverin Mouyengo, they did not see themselves as troublemakers but as people who simply enjoyed fashion and elegance. As tensions grew, acts of protest became more common. During a football match in Brazzaville in 1980, several well-known sapeurs reportedly marched in front of government officials before burning clothing in a symbolic protest. The event received wide attention and is often viewed as an important moment in the history of La Sape.

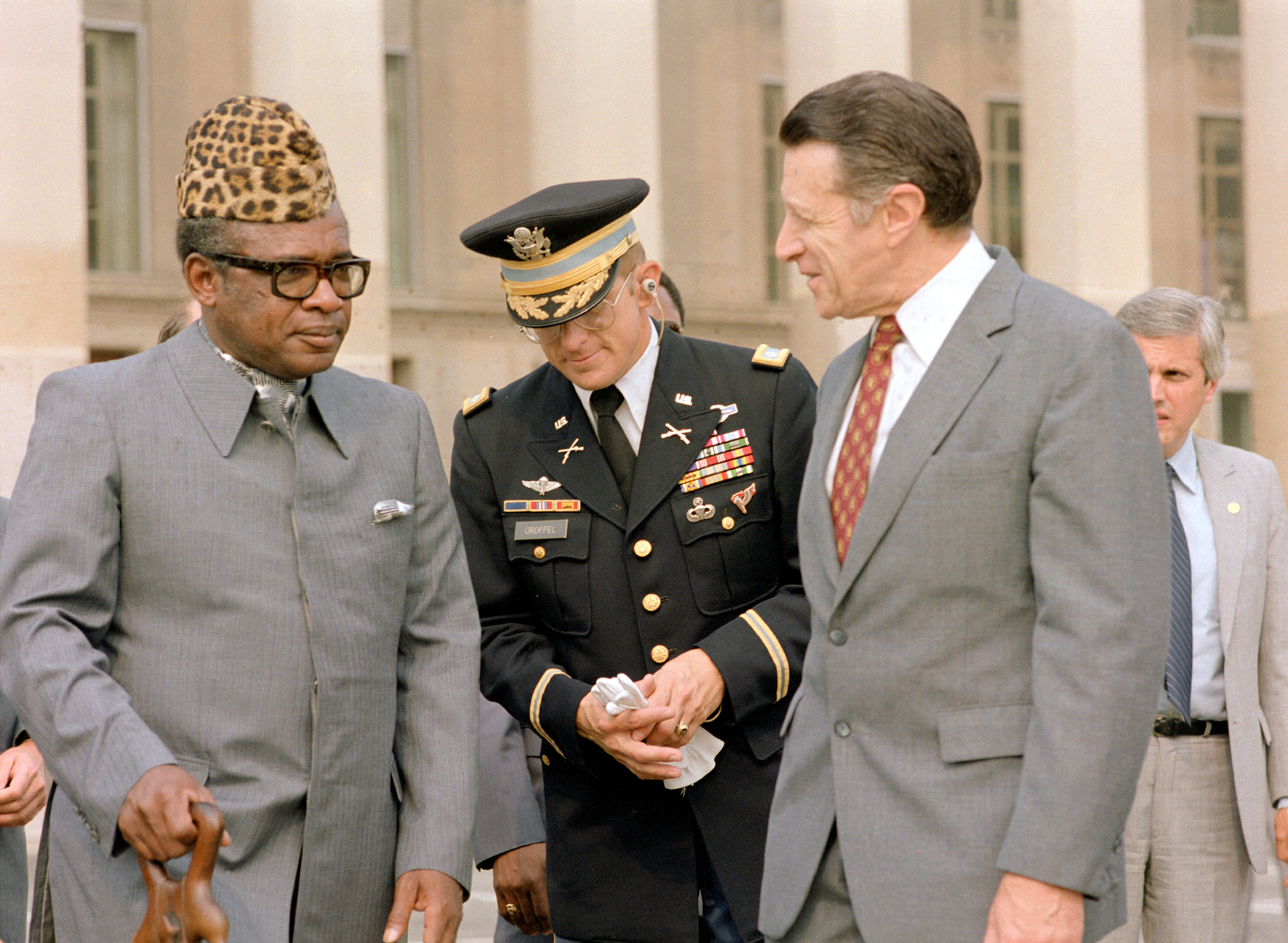
Mobutu (left), wearing a long-sleeved abacost and "Mobutu Hat" with Caspar W. Weinberger (right), wearing a Western lounge suit, during a state visit to the United States in 1983

In Kinshasa, government efforts to control dress took a different form. In the early 1970s, President Mobutu Sese Seko promoted the abacost ("à bas le costume", or "down with the suit"), a lightweight jacket designed to replace European-style suits and neckties as part of his Authenticité policy. Influenced partly by contemporary Chinese revolutionary clothing, the abacost was meant to reduce European influence. Sapeurs reacted by rejecting or reshaping these official dress rules. Some created suits from raffia and other local materials, while others altered traditional suits in unusual ways. They also borrowed symbols linked to Mobutu's image, including leopard-skin caps, carved walking sticks, and elephant-tail fly whisks.

La Sape's interest in history could also be seen in its clothing styles. During the late 1970s, the first generation of post-independence sapeurs arrived in France. For many of them, ideas about colonialism became closely tied to migration and identity. Some sapeurs, such as Djo Balard, wore white colonial helmets during elegance contests, while others, including Docteur Limane, mixed military-inspired clothing with modern designer fashion. Certain outfits even copied colonial uniforms from the early twentieth century. These styles matched fashion trends of the 1980s. After Yves Saint Laurent popularized his "safari" collections, which drew inspiration in part from colonial and military clothing, tropical and colonial aesthetics became widespread in European fashion and nightlife. Comparable styles also appeared in French nightclubs, including the Macumba chain.

Sapeurs also preserved older forms of performance through what became known as the "dance of the labels" (danse des griffes). Practiced in Paris during the 1980s, particularly in venues such as Château d'Eau and the Rex Club, the dance focused on showing luxury clothing and accessories. Participants used planned movements to draw attention to brand labels, socks, and other details of their outfits. Historians have noted similarities between these performances and earlier dances practiced in colonial urban settlements during the twentieth century, which suggested that La Sape continued older traditions of public display and style.

Japanese fashion also became an important influence on the movement. During the 1980s, many sapeurs in Kinshasa became interested in designers such as Yohji Yamamoto and Comme des Garçons. The restrained cuts and minimalist aesthetics of Japanese fashion offered an alternative to colonial clothing traditions and government ideas about Authenticité. It also had a political meaning because Japan had not taken part in the colonization of Africa.

In the 2000s, La Sape gained increasing recognition around the world. In the early 2000s, Alain Akouala Atipault, the Republic of the Congo's Minister of Communications and a sapeurs, helped promote the movement internationally. In 2010, Paul Smith created a fashion collection inspired by the sapeurs. In 2014, it was estimated that several thousand sapeurs participated in parades and public displays in Kinshasa. In France, an exhibition dedicated to the movement was held at the Palais de Tokyo in 2015. Later that year in December, Montreal hosted its first sape-themed event. At the 2023 Jeux de la Francophonie, the opening ceremony featured a performance by sapeurs.

=== La Sape in Paris ===
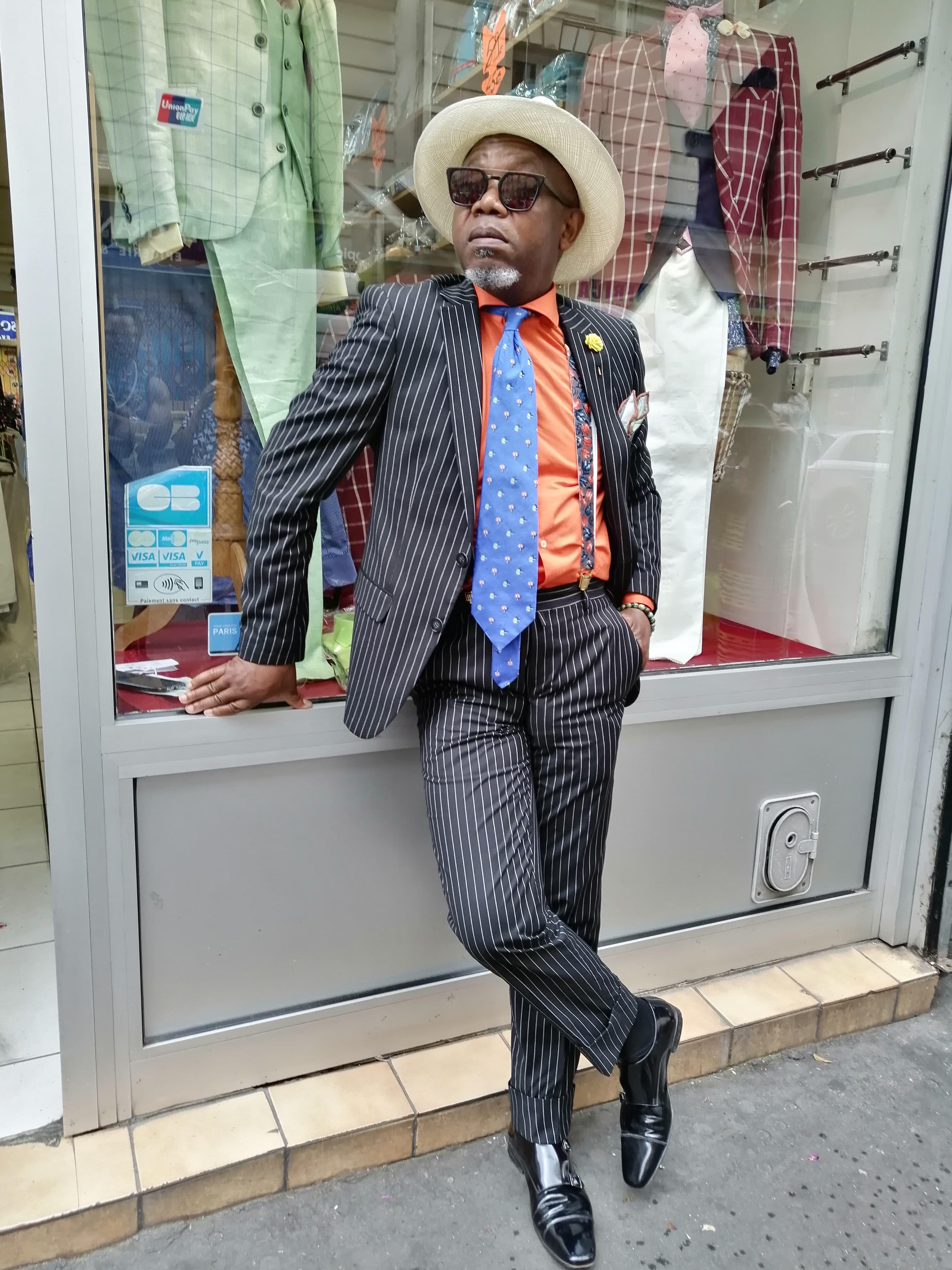
Jocelyn Armel (aka Le Bachelor), a prominent sapeur from the Château Rouge quartier

Space, mobility, and migration have been central to the development of La Sape, particularly as imported European goods arriving in Central Africa during the nineteenth century were often given symbolic meanings and became the subject of local narratives. By the late twentieth century, however, a new generation of Congolese migrants began traveling directly to Europe in search of what became known as l'Aventure ("the Adventure"). As air travel became more common, ships were used less often, and airlines such as Air Afrique, Sabena, and Air France came to symbolize migration and access to the fashion world. Flight attendants also became widely seen as "symbols of modern elegance and cosmopolitanism".

Many sapeurs viewed Paris as a special place in their vision. Historian Didier Gondola explained that the city was seen as the dream destination for the Aventurier, a migrant who traveled to France in search of social status and recognition through fashion prestige. Even after France tightened immigration laws in the mid-1970s, reaching Paris remained a major achievement in sapeur culture. The journey itself was often viewed as an important step that marked a person's entry into the community of successful sapeurs. After reaching Paris, many sapeurs found new ways to experience and present the city through fashion. They often posed for photographs in front of famous landmarks such as the Eiffel Tower, Trocadéro, and the Musée de l'Homme, as well as in ordinary places like cafés, phone booths, and metro stations. Although many lived and worked in modest circumstances, fashion allowed them to create a different image of Paris based on elegance, shopping, and public visibility. Luxury shopping areas became especially important, and sapeurs regularly visited quartiers such as Saint-Honoré, Madeleine, Opéra, and Saint-Germain-des-Prés, where they frequented boutiques, tailors, and shoemakers. Visits to fashion houses often involved long periods spent examining garments, discussing brands, and following new trends, regardless of whether purchases were made. Shoes were especially valued because they were often among the most expensive and respected parts of a sapeur's outfit. For this reason, stores such as J. M. Weston became popular destinations. Through these shops and luxury brands, Paris became a real and symbolic center of fashion within La Sape.

As La Sape grew, sapeurs began using city streets and public spaces as places to present their fashion, drawing inspiration from nineteenth-century dandies. They created a special style of walking called diattance, a "deliberate and carefully controlled manner of movement characterized by elegance and the appearance of effortless ease". The practice began in Brazzaville and Léopoldville (now Kinshasa) during the 1920s. During the colonial era, most Africans traveled by foot or bicycle, while Europeans mainly used cars. Sapeurs used their appearance and manner of walking to separate themselves from ordinary laborers. By the late 1970s in Pointe-Noire, they had become known for their distinctive walking styles and frequent outfit changes. The practice later spread to Paris, where slow or exaggerated walking styles helped distinguish sapeurs from immigrant laborers whose lives were shaped by strict work schedules. Some figures, such as Le Bachelor (born Ricley Loubaky), became well known for their distinctive public performances. These displays often took place in urban spaces, especially around the Place de la République and the cafés and brasseries near Château d'Eau. Sidewalks and public squares became temporary runways where sapeurs could show off their clothing and personal style. Nightclubs were also important to the movement. During the 1970s, many fashionable clubs were difficult for African immigrants to enter, while others were too expensive for working-class migrants. One of the most famous venues was La Main Bleue in Montreuil, which opened in 1976 and became a popular meeting place for sapeurs and West African workers. Journalists described patrons arriving in brightly colored suits, satin ties, Borsalino hats, and narrow frock coats while dancing to Congolese rumba and Afrobeat.

La Main Bleue gradually gained attention from Paris's fashion and cultural scene. By the late 1970s, designers, artists, and people working in fashion were regularly visiting the club. Figures such as Karl Lagerfeld and Kenzō Takada were linked to the venue, which became known for its distinctive style and atmosphere, but differences between its growing popularity among fashion elites and the financial situation of many immigrant customers helped lead to its closure in 1979. During the 1980s, sapeurs continued to hold fashion shows and elegance competitions in rented halls across Paris, especially in the city's eastern and northern quartiers. One of the main venues was Rex Club. At these events, participants walked before audiences while Congolese rumba bands played and presenters introduced the contestants. The competitions focused on designer clothing, luxury accessories, and well-known fashion brands. One of the most popular parts of these events was the "dance of the labels" (danse des griffes), where participants used poses and movements to draw attention to the brands they were wearing. This practice appeared in the 1986 film Black Mic-Mac, which showed fashion contests featuring outfits by designers such as Yohji Yamamoto and Yves Saint Laurent, alongside combinations of colonial-inspired attire and contemporary luxury fashion. Sapeurs created their own fashion runways within the city through these events, and although the mainstream fashion industry often paid little attention to the movement, apart from figures like Jean-Paul Gaultier, La Sape built its own audiences, events, and forms of recognition outside the traditional fashion world.

Sapeurs often viewed Paris and Brazzaville as "mirror images of one another, with Brussels and Kinshasa playing a similar, though less prominent, role". In Congo, attending sapeur gatherings often required more than wearing fashionable clothes. People usually needed a laissez-passer ("pass"), which took the form of a personal invitation. After nightclubs reopened in Brazzaville in the early 1980s, other signs of connection to Paris became important. Some venues required visitors to show a Paris Métro ticket or, preferably, a Carte Orange, the public transportation pass introduced in Paris in 1975 by the Paris transport authority (Régie autonome des transports parisiens; RATP). Because it included a photograph, the card served as proof of travel and ties to France. For many sapeurs, it became almost as valuable as a passport. This importance reflected a longer history in which travel documents played a major role in people's lives. During the colonial period, Africans often had to carry passes and identity papers when traveling. Later, migration to Europe brought new requirements such as passports, visas, residence permits, and residency cards. Within sapeur culture, these documents became symbols of status and authenticity, much like designer clothing displayed during the descente, the celebrated return of migrants to Brazzaville or Kinshasa. Having a luxury item, such as an Yves Saint Laurent jacket, and a Paris transport pass showed a connection to the fashion capital. Returning migrants also helped bring elements of Parisian life to Congo. The return journeys of Aventuriers and Mikilistes also contributed to the cultural reproduction of Paris in Congo. During the 1980s, clubs, bars, and businesses in Brazzaville began adopting names inspired by Paris. La Main Bleue, which opened in Brazzaville in 1982, was one example.

=== Immigrant playboys ===
In Paris and Brazzaville, the Aventuriers were often viewed with suspicion. In the Democratic Republic of the Congo, Mobutu Sese Seko's policy of Authenticité, and in the Republic of the Congo, the Marxist-Leninist government, discouraged conspicuous displays of European fashion, which were often interpreted as expressions of allegiance to former colonial powers and capitalist values. In France, immigrant workers were generally expected to embody modesty and discretion. While adopting European styles of dress could be regarded as evidence of successful integration, excessive elegance often attracted suspicions of welfare fraud, illicit activity, or unexplained wealth. In response, sapeurs adopted what they saw as the appearance of success. Rather than copying the conventional appearance of corporate executives, they embraced the more relaxed image of the playboy, golden boy, or yuppie, figures linked to the culture of wealth that became popular during the 1980s. Books such as the 1984 The Yuppie Handbook: The State-of-the Art Manual for Young Urban Professionals promoted a lifestyle centered on consumer goods such as Burberry trench coats and Rolex watches. Although most sapeurs did not enjoy the wealth associated with these lifestyles, they adopted their symbols and fashion choices. Their appearance combined influences from colonial-era clothing, Parisian nightlife, traditions of masculine elegance, and modern business culture. Designer clothing, luxury accessories, and carefully maintained appearances became important parts of their identity. Some even altered their appearance through skin-lightening practices or by adopting physical traits associated with bourgeois respectability. This attraction to luxury was especially notable because many sapeurs also supported socialist political ideas. For them, fashion became a way to express personal freedom and individuality in opposition to official uniforms and government-imposed dress codes. As sapeur Djo Balard explained in 1984, capitalism appealed to him because it represented the freedom to choose one's own lifestyle and display the signs of success that came with it.

Many critics viewed sapeurs as people who were merely copying European elites and businessmen. Similar criticisms had been made since the late nineteenth century, when well-dressed Congolese men were sometimes dismissed as vernivolus, a term used for people considered only superficially "civilized" because of the clothes they wore. Most sapeurs, however, did not claim to be businessmen or members of the upper class. Instead, they used fashion to present and perform an image of success. Le Bachelor described La Sape as full of contradictions because it combined outward luxury with modest living conditions. This contrast often appeared in media coverage. In a 1986 television report, sapeurs such as Lamine and Balard were shown buying luxury items before returning to their small attic apartments, where they proudly displayed their purchases. Such scenes accentuated the gap between the glamorous image of La Sape and the daily realities faced by many sapeurs. Public mockery of such behavior was not new. During the colonial era, observers often laughed at Congolese men who adopted impressive titles, elegant clothing, and formal manners. For example, a 1928 account from Élisabethville (now Lubumbashi) described fashionable African men giving themselves prestigious titles and copying the language of colonial officials. While some people viewed these performances as harmless fun, others saw a deeper meaning behind them. Scholars have explained this through the idea of "colonial mimicry", developed by cultural theorist Homi K. Bhabha. In this view, imitation was a way of adapting and a way of questioning existing power structures. Charpy argued that sapeurs copied and challenged the social hierarchies of colonialism and capitalism by using symbols of power, status, and success. He also suggested that the playboy figure in La Sape was more than an imitator; he was a performer who used fashion to explore questions of identity, status, and social influence.

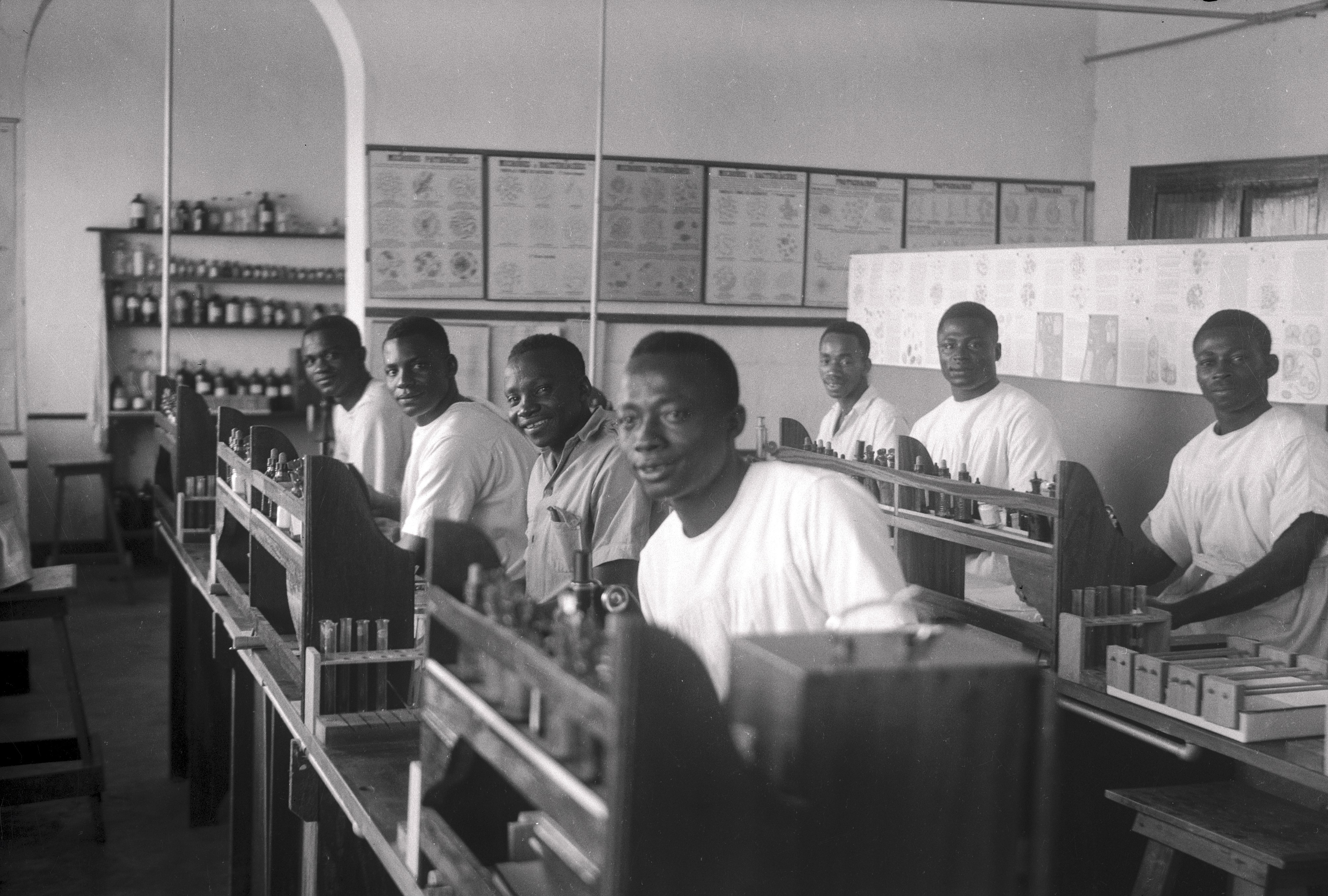
Évolués in the Belgian Congo studying medicine in Medical School of Yakusu Hospital, near Kisangani.

Many sapeurs argued that they should not be limited to the role of manual workers and instead claimed a place among office workers and professionals. This was part of a much older tradition. Since the beginning of the twentieth century, clothing had served as a marker of social status among Africans living under colonial rule. Well-dressed people were often identified as évolués, educated African clerks and subordinate administrators employed within the French and Belgian colonial systems. Along with speaking European languages, dressing well became a way to gain access to administrative jobs and avoid forced labor. As early as the 1900s, Congolese men used elegant clothing to separate themselves from manual work. Clean shirts and light suede shoes became symbols of respectability and social progress. Colonial authorities often viewed these displays with suspicion. For example, in Tintin in the Congo (1931), a Congolese man wearing a Panama hat, tie, and carefully maintained shirt cuffs is shown refusing physical work because he does not want to dirty his outfit. Colonial officials increasingly saw elegance as a challenge to the existing social order. In 1930, the lieutenant governor of Middle Congo (now the Republic of the Congo) complained that some Africans were becoming too confident in their interactions with Europeans. He blamed this attitude on the rise of a well-dressed African elite whose improved living conditions encouraged demands for greater equality. Reports from Brazzaville also described growing tensions between African workers and European employers, as some Africans increasingly presented themselves as social equals of Europeans. As a result, displays of elegance sometimes became targets of repression. While clothing itself could not easily be regulated, many well-dressed men were arrested on charges such as fraud and other offenses.

Until the years leading up to independence, colonial authorities continued to criticize well-dressed African clerks and assistants, arguing that their appearance challenged accepted social boundaries. Similar attitudes later appeared among African migrants in Europe. For many immigrants, dressing elegantly became a way to maintain dignity and gain recognition in societies that often viewed them only as low-paid workers. In a 1977 interview at La Main Bleue nightclub, a Malian immigrant explained that fashion was more than clothing; it was a way of showing that one existed and deserved respect. He described elegant dress and music as forms of resistance against social marginalization and negative stereotypes about immigrant workers. Sapeurs shared this view and rejected the image of the poorly dressed laborer. In 1986, Balard remarked provocatively that jeans were clothes for mechanics and that he refused to wear them. Sapeurs symbolically rejected the image of the immigrant worker dressed in second-hand clothing by adopting the appearance of a playboy. This idea also influenced the language of La Sape. Words connected to labor and industry were given new meanings related to fashion. For example, going "to the chain" referred to walking along the chains around the Place de la République in Paris, while going "to the mine" meant exchanging clothes. Likewise, "clocking in" referred to presenting one's collection of garments and fashion combinations. Through such practices, sapeurs turned the "vocabulary of labor into a vocabulary of style, using fashion as a means of asserting status, individuality, and social recognition".

This visibility and public display often unsettled French society. Although they appeared to imitate European styles and social norms, they did so through "forms of performance and masquerade that remained deliberately ambiguous". During the 1980s, France saw growing interest in world music and Afro-themed nightclubs, but it also experienced increasing anti-immigration attitudes. At the same time, anti-racist movements such as the March for Equality and Against Racism in 1983 and SOS Racisme in 1984 gained support. In this political environment, where immigration was a major public issue, sapeurs were often portrayed as "bad immigrants". Critics accused them of spending too much money on luxury clothing instead of saving for things like homes or cars. By contrast, the image of the "good immigrant" emphasized hard work, modesty, and a willingness to accept any job. Through their public displays of fashion and consumption, sapeurs challenged these expectations. When they returned to Congo, however, they often faced similar criticism. Many people viewed the so-called "Parisians" as irresponsible migrants who spent large amounts on fashion rather than helping their families. In the Republic of the Congo, the government of the Congolese Labour Party launched media campaigns against this youth culture, portraying many migrants in Paris as irresponsible or delinquent. These portrayals ignored the fact that many migrants participated in trade during their return visits and regularly supported their households. The movement also caused discomfort among some groups on the French left. Because sapeurs embraced luxury goods and consumer culture, some observers saw them as celebrating capitalism and distancing themselves from other immigrant communities. Others argued that they reflected the influence of colonial values.

=== La Sape in popular music ===
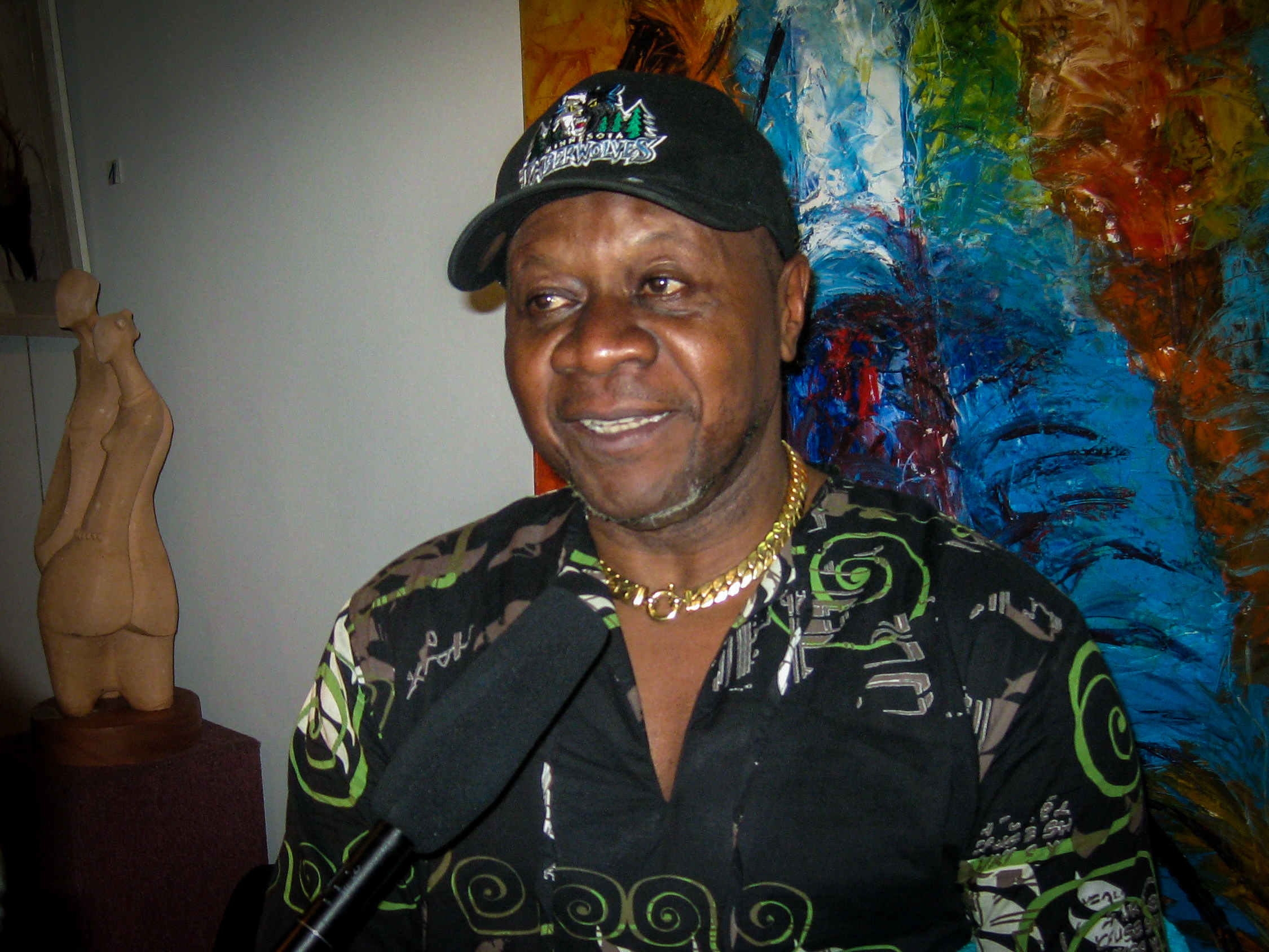
Musician Papa Wemba was an important supporter of La Sape in Congo.

From the 1960s onward, many Congolese bands increasingly included references to fashion and elegance in their songs. Musicians and figures associated with La Sape, such as Papa Wemba, Stervos Niarcos, Rapha Bounzeki, Modogo Gian Franco Ferré, King Kester Emeneya, Koffi Olomide, Général Défao, Aurlus Mabélé, and JB Mpiana, frequently mentioned luxury brands in their songs. In Paris, however, Congolese rumba initially received little attention from mainstream media. Radio stations such as Africa No. 1 were difficult for many listeners to access until the early 1990s, while state-controlled broadcasters dominated radio in both Congos. Because of this, cassette tapes became an important way of sharing music. By the late 1970s, people were building personal music collections through copying and exchanging cassettes.

The growing availability of cassette recorders also allowed migrants to play a larger role in producing and distributing music. Within migrant communities, cassette tapes became especially valuable. As sociologist Abdelmalek Sayad noted, recorded messages and songs were regularly exchanged between Europe and Africa, which helped migrants to maintain social and cultural connections despite distance and literacy barriers. For sapeurs, these recordings often accompanied fashion displays and served a role similar to commentary at a fashion show. The movement later appeared in Solange's 2012 music video for "Losing You". In August 2015, sapeurs were featured in Maître Gims' video for "Sapés comme jamais". They also appeared in January 2018 in Kendrick Lamar's video for "All the Stars", which was part of the soundtrack album for Black Panther.

== Notable sapeurs ==
- Papa Wemba
- King Kester Emeneya
- Koffi Olomide
- Aurlus Mabélé
- Michel Kuka Mboladinga
- Général Défao

== See also ==
- Swenkas – a similar movement in South Africa
- Stilyagi – a similar movement in Soviet Russia
- Zoot Suit
- 1980s in African fashion
- 2010s in African fashion
