= Lumumba Vea =

Congolese football fan

Michel Kuka Mboladinga
- Born: Michel Kuka Mboladinga; 26 September 1976 (age 49); Zaire
- Other name: Lumumba Vea
- Years active: 2013–present
- Known for: Performing as a living statue of Patrice Lumumba in the stands during DR Congo national football team matches

Michel Kuka Mboladinga (born 26 September 1976), also known by the nickname Lumumba Vea, is a Congolese football fan known for his distinctive living statue routine during DR Congo national football team matches. Since 2013, he has stood motionless throughout games, mimicking the posture of the Patrice Lumumba statue in Kinshasa. He gained international media attention during the 2025 Africa Cup of Nations in Morocco.

== Early life ==
Mboladinga was born on 26 September 1976. He is from the Democratic Republic of the Congo. He has been a fan of the national football team, nicknamed the Leopards, since 2013, when he began standing motionless during matches. In interviews, he has described his actions as both patriotic and artistic.

== Living statue ==
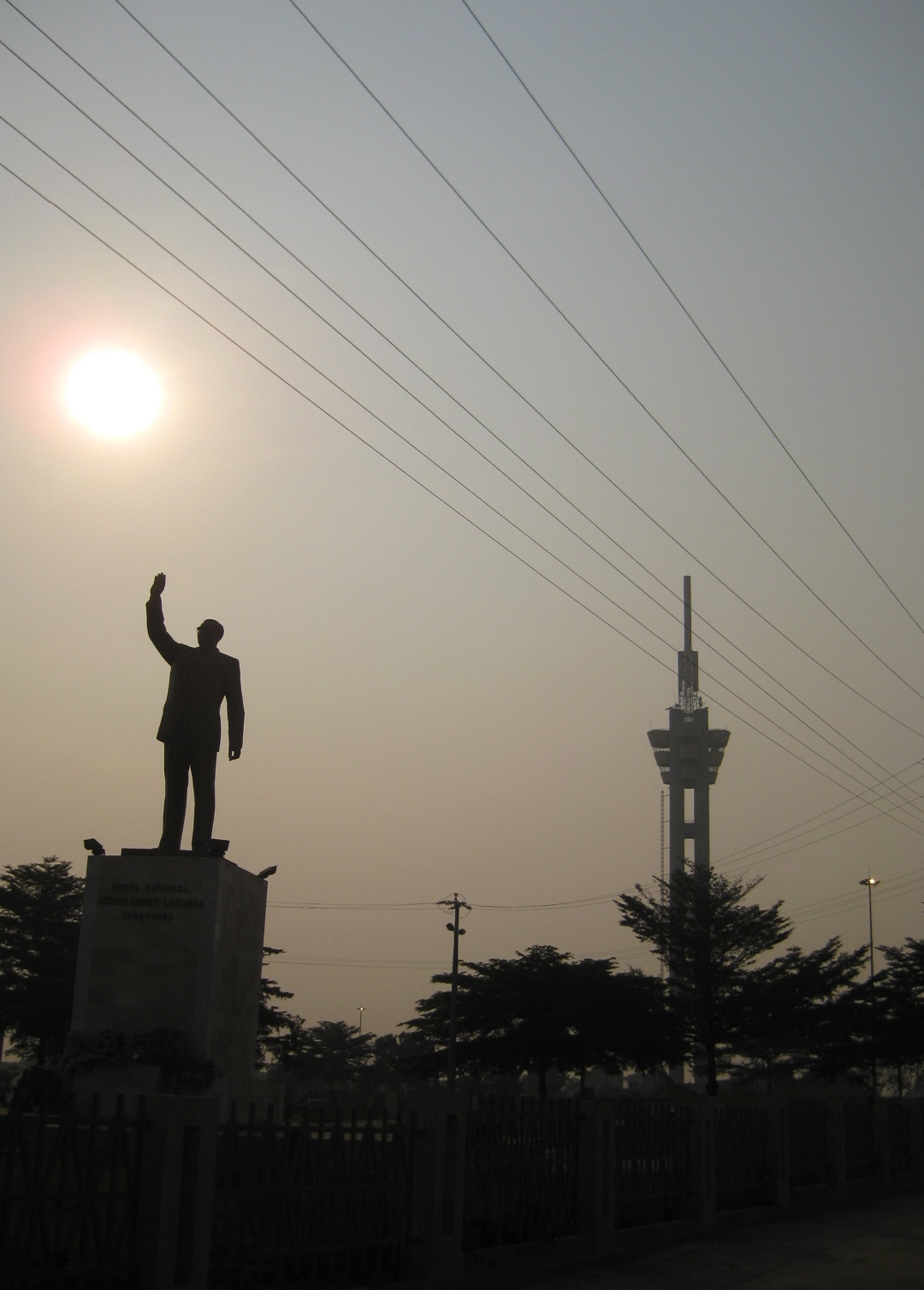
Patrice Lumumba statue in Kinshasa

During matches, Mboladinga stands still for the entire 90 minutes, often on a small platform. He raises his right arm toward the sky, copying the pose of the Patrice Lumumba statue in Kinshasa. In this role, he goes by Lumumba Vea.

He typically wears a suit in the colors of the Congolese flag (blue, yellow, and red). His hairstyle and glasses are styled to resemble the 1960s era.

In media interviews, Nkuka has stated that his stance is meant as a tribute to Lumumba and represents values of dignity, freedom, and national sovereignty.

=== Stated purpose ===
Kuka has described his actions as extending beyond football support. In interviews, he has called it a "patriotic mission" intended to honor Congolese history and to provide moral support to the national team.

Media reports have noted his behavior as an example of using sports to express historical and national identity in the Democratic Republic of the Congo.

== International appearances ==
During the 2025 Africa Cup of Nations, Kuka's motionless presence in the stands attracted attention from international media outlets. His behavior contrasted with the typically animated atmosphere of African football matches.

His image was shared widely on social media, where users called him "the statue fan" or "the grandson of Lumumba." Television broadcasts of DRC matches frequently showed him in the stands. Some other fans were also seen standing in the same position as a tribute.

Before every game, Nkuka Mboladinga is reported to train by standing still for 45 to 50 minutes at a time. Even though the fans around him were excited and energetic, he prepared himself for the possibility of staying motionless throughout extra time and penalty shootouts after DR Congo qualified for the knockout stages against Algeria.

When DR Congo lost 1-0 to Algeria during extra time of the round of 16, Mboladinga, crying, fell into the crowd in his final performance, and soon after, Algerian player Mohamed Amine Amoura faced criticism for celebrating while imitating Mboladinga and falling to the ground as if the statue had been knocked over. He later apologized on social media, admitting he had no understanding of the DR Congo fan's gesture's real meaning and history and was 'simply joking around,' expressing respect for Congo and its team. Algeria's football team also apologized to Nkuka Mboladinga before he left Morocco by giving him a shirt with "Lumumba" on the back and another with Amoura's name. In another game between Nigeria and Algeria, Nigeria's striker Akor Adams gave tribute to Nkuka Mboladinga after he scored against Algeria at the quarter finals.

Mboladinga was unable to attend DR Congo's first match of the 2026 FIFA World Cup against Portugal due to a quarantine during the 2026 Ebola epidemic. He did attend the second match against Colombia on 23 June 2026 in Guadalajara, Mexico. However, prior to the match against Uzbekistan, Mboladinga was denied a visa by the United States, despite this DR Congo qualified for the round of 32 in his absence, where they went on to play England.

== See also ==
- La Sape
- Football in the Democratic Republic of the Congo
