= Swenkas =

Zulu fashion and dance competitors

In South Africa, Swenkas are working-class Zulu men who participate in amateur competitions that are part fashion show and part choreography, the purpose of which is to display one's style and sense of attitude. The practice, called "swenking", ultimately derives from the English word "swank".

These well-dressed men are proud and considered to serve as an inspiration to others. Frequently, on Saturday nights they meet up to compete in a fashion show of sorts. The Swenkas are judged both on what they are wearing (typically, expensive designer suits with well-known European names on their labels) and their choreographed movements (their 'swank'). There is an entrance fee to compete in these swank-offs and the winner of the night goes home with a portion of the money collected from the competitors. The men follow certain set values of swanking, such as physical cleanliness, sobriety and above all self-respect. Filmmaker Jeppe Rønde examined this in his 2004 documentary film The Swenkas.

Elements of so-called "African dandyism" as expressed by the Swenkas are also found in the Democratic Republic of Congo (DRC), where the participants are known as Sapeurs and the phenomenon is called La Sape or Sapologie. According to a documentary The Congo Dandies produced by RT, Congolese soldiers returning home from France after WW2 brought with them a taste for the latest Parisian fashion, but other sources say that as early as the 1920's West African colonial workers called "Bapopo" or "Coastmen" who came to the Congo, inspired the Congolese elite to cast off notions of ingrained inferiority caused by French and Belgian colonialism.

== See also ==
- La Sape - similar movement in Republic of Congo
- Vogue (dance)
