= La Main bleue =

Nightclub in Montreuil, France

La Main bleue was a nightclub in Montreuil, Seine-Saint-Denis, France. Opened in 1976, it closed in 1979.
