= J. M. Weston =

French luxury shoe company

J.M. Weston
- Industry: Fashion
- Founded: 1891; 135 years ago in Limoges, France
- Founder: Édouard Blanchard
- Headquarters: Limoges
- Products: Leather goods, shoes
- Website: jmweston.com

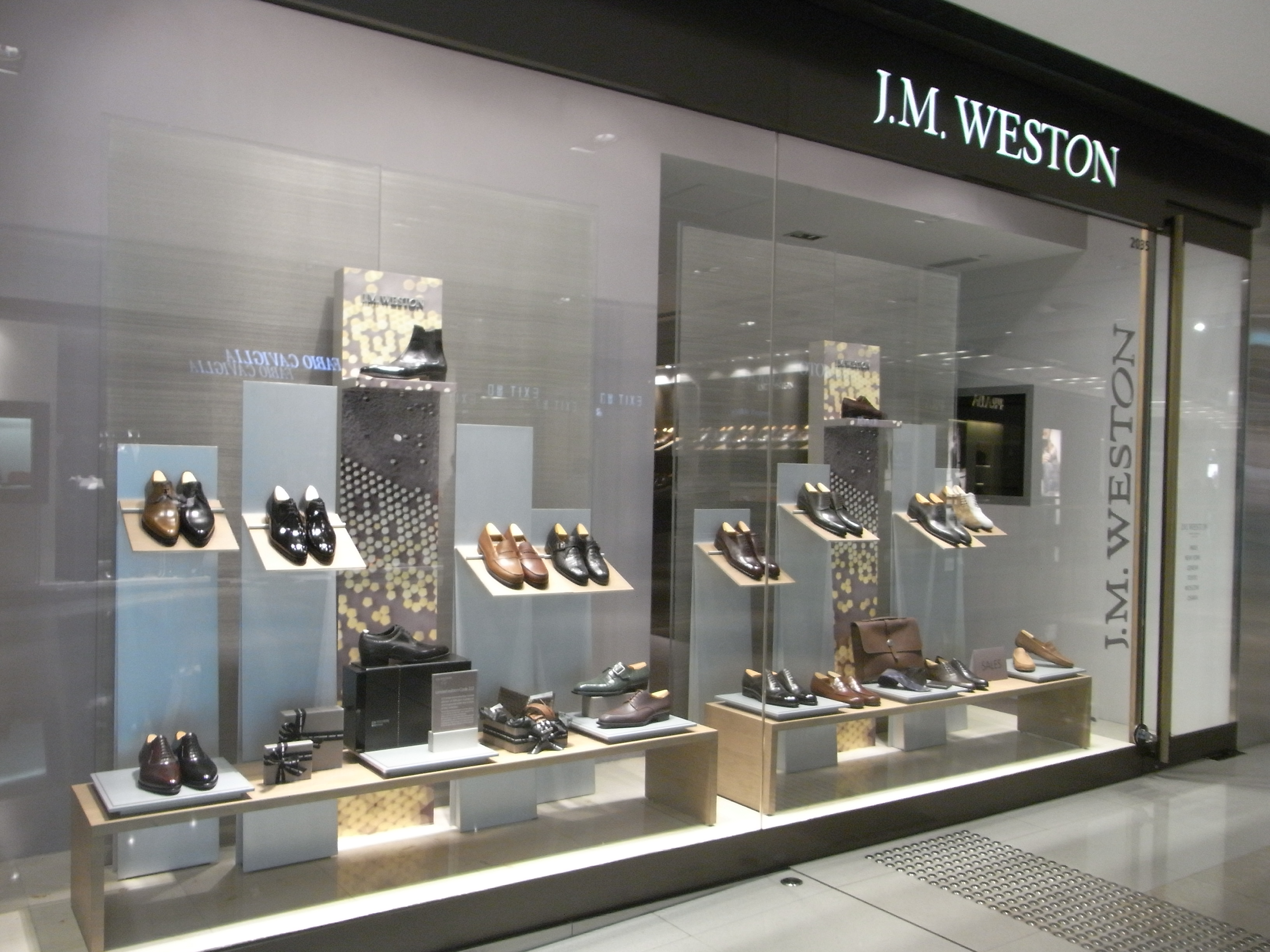
A footwear shop of J. M. Weston is running in IFC Mall (Hong Kong).

J.M. Weston is a French luxury shoe company founded by Édouard Blanchard in 1891 in Limoges.

== Overview ==
The company is known for its handmade shoes for men. They also produce a full line of leather goods ranging from belts and briefcases to luggage items.

The company's most famous models are the 677 Chasse (a sturdy outdoor shoe), 598 Demi-Chasse (a dressier version of the Chasse), and the 180 Mocassin (a classic penny loafer).

== Stores ==
J.M. Weston shoes are sold in its own boutiques, or in luxury department stores such as Harvey Nichols.
