= Solange discography =

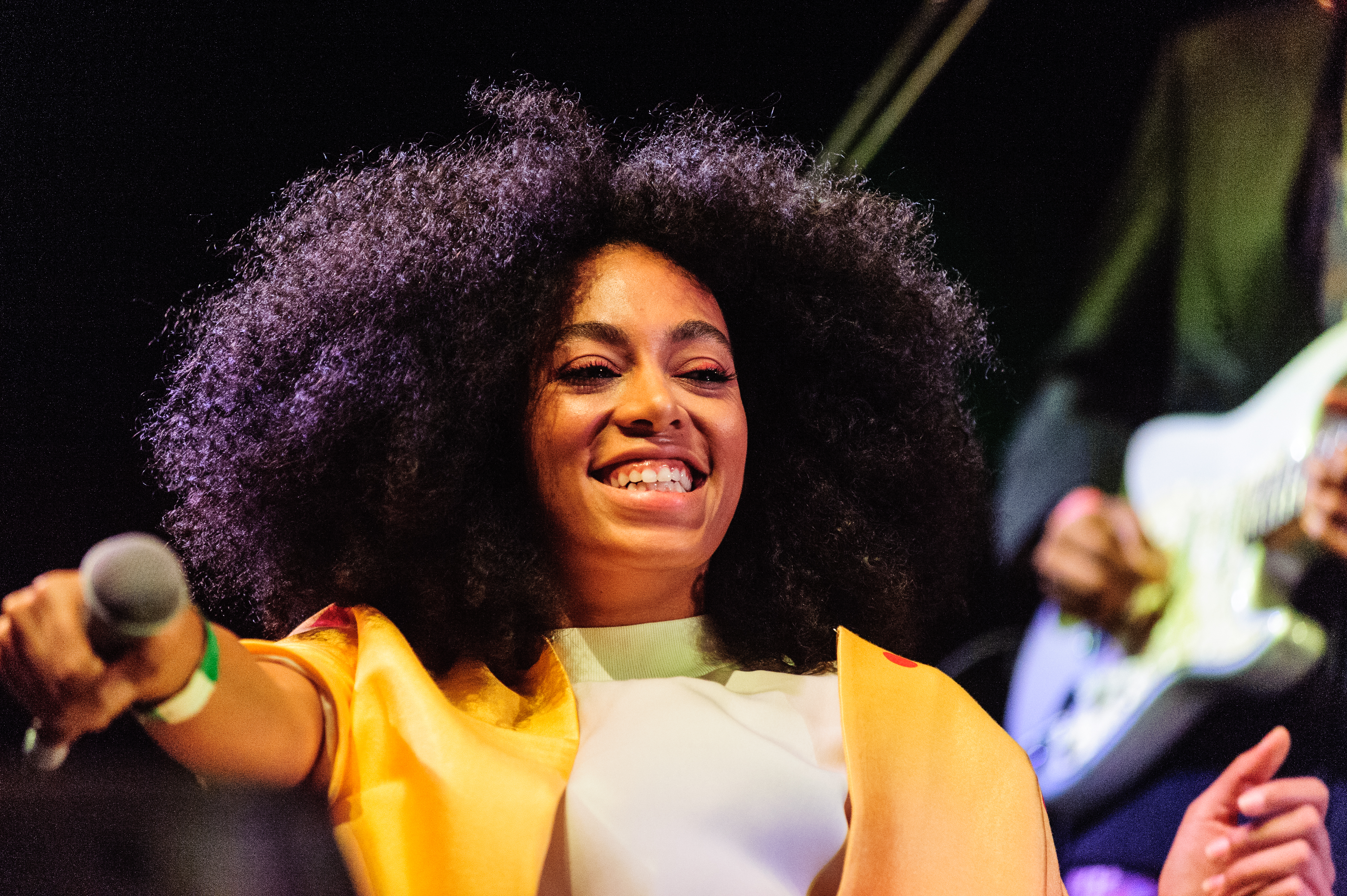
- Solange performing at the Coachella Festival in Indio, California, 2014
- Studio albums: 4
- Extended plays: 1
- Singles: 14
- Music videos: 8

American singer and songwriter Solange has released four studio albums: Solo Star in 2002, Sol-Angel and the Hadley St. Dreams in 2008, A Seat at the Table in 2016, which peaked at number one in the US Billboard 200 chart, and When I Get Home in 2019. Solange released a music video and single for "Losing You" on October 2, 2012. The single was released in promotion of her first EP, titled True, which Solange worked on with Dev Hynes and was released on November 27, 2012, by Terrible Records.

== Albums ==
=== Studio albums ===
List of studio albums, with selected chart positions and sales figures
Title	Album details	Peak chart positions										Sales	Certifications
Title	Album details	US	US R&B /HH	AUS	BEL (FL)	CAN	DEN	FRA	NLD	NZ	UK	Sales	Certifications
Solo Star	Released: December 26, 2002; Label: Music World, Columbia; Formats: CD, digital download, streaming	49	23	—	—	—	—	—	—	—	—	US: 112,000	
Sol-Angel and the Hadley St. Dreams	Released: August 26, 2008; Label: Music World, Geffen; Formats: CD, digital download, streaming	9	3	—	—	—	—	—	—	—	180	US: 197,000	
A Seat at the Table	Released: September 30, 2016; Label: Saint, Columbia; Formats: CD, LP, digital download, streaming	1	1	21	45	10	17	74	17	23	17	US: 46,000; UK: 51,922	RIAA: Gold; BPI: Silver; IFPI Danmark: Gold
When I Get Home	Released: March 1, 2019; Label: Saint, Columbia; Formats: LP, digital download, streaming	7	3	17	18	16	21	84	19	26	18	US: 11,000	
"—" denotes an album that did not chart or was not released in that territory.

=== Compilation albums ===
List of compilation albums, with selected details
Title	Album details
Saint Heron	Released: November 12, 2013; Labels: Saint Records; Sony Music; Formats: CD, 12" LP, digital download

== Extended plays ==
List of extended plays, with selected chart positions
Title	Details	Peak chart positions				
Title	Details	US	US R&B/HH	DEN	FRA	SWE
True	Released: November 27, 2012; Label: Terrible; Formats: CD, LP, digital download, streaming	157	17	40	164	57

== Singles ==
=== As lead artist ===
List of singles as lead artist, with selected chart positions and certifications, showing year released and album name
Title	Year	Peak chart positions										Certifications	Album
Title	Year	US	US R&B /HH	US Dance	BEL (FL) Tip	BEL (WA) Tip	DEN	FRA	IRL	UK	UK R&B	Certifications	Album
"Naïve" (featuring Beyoncé and Da Brat)	2002	—	—	—	—	—	—	—	—	—	—		Solo Star
"Feelin' You (Part II)" (featuring N.O.R.E.)	2002	—	73	—	—	—	—	—	—	—	—		Solo Star
"Crush"	2003	—	—	—	—	—	—	—	—	—	—		Solo Star
"I Decided"^{[A]}	2008	—	44	1	—	—	—	28	49	27	6		Sol-Angel and the Hadley St. Dreams
"Champagnechroniknightcap" (featuring Lil Wayne)	2008	—	—	—	—	—	—	—	—	—	—		Sol-Angel and the Hadley St. Dreams
"Sandcastle Disco"	2008	—	—	1	—	—	—	—	—	149	—		Sol-Angel and the Hadley St. Dreams
"T.O.N.Y."	2009	—	62	1	—	—	—	—	—	—	—		Sol-Angel and the Hadley St. Dreams
"Would've Been the One"	2009	—	—	3	—	—	—	—	—	—	—		Sol-Angel and the Hadley St. Dreams
"Fuck the Industry"	2010	—	—	6	—	—	—	—	—	—	—		Sol-Angel and the Hadley St. Dreams
"I Told You So"	2010	—	—	5	—	—	—	—	—	—	—		Sol-Angel and the Hadley St. Dreams
"Wanna Go Back" (featuring Q-Tip & Marsha Ambrosius)	2010	—	—	—	—	—	—	—	—	—	—		Sol-Angel and the Hadley St. Dreams
"The Thrill Is Gone" (featuring B.B. King)	2010	—	—	—	—	—	—	—	—	—	—		Sol-Angel and the Hadley St. Dreams
"6 O'Clock Blues"	2010	—	—	—	—	—	—	—	—	—	—		Sol-Angel and the Hadley St. Dreams
"Losing You"	2012	—	—	—	4	37	9	38	—	155	—	BPI: Silver	True
"Looks Good with Trouble" (featuring Kendrick Lamar)	2013	—	—	—	—	—	—	—	—	—	—		True
"Lovers in the Parking Lot"	2013	—	—	—	—	—	—	—	—	—	—		True
"Cranes in the Sky"	2016	74	28	—	30	—	—	—	—	—	29	RIAA: Gold; BPI: Silver	A Seat at the Table
"—" denotes releases that did not chart or were not released in that territory.

Notes

- A "I Decided" was also released as "I Decided, Pt I" in various countries. The main single release in the United Kingdom of "I Decided" was a Freemasons remix titled "I Decided, Pt II".

=== As featured artist ===
Song	Year	Peak chart position	Album
Song	Year	US R&B/HH	Album
"True Love" (with Lil' Romeo)	2002	— (Note: "True Love" did not enter the Billboard Hot R&B/Hip-Hop Songs, but peaked at number 16 on the Bubbling Under R&B/Hip-Hop Singles chart.)	Solo Star / Game Time
"Flying Overseas" (with Theophilus London, also featuring Devonté Hynes)	2010	—	Timez Are Weird These Days
"Semicolon" (with The Lonely Island)	2013	—	The Wack Album
"Cash In" (alongside various artists)	2013	—	Saint Heron
"Electric Lady" (with Janelle Monáe)	2014	—	The Electric Lady
"—" denotes items that failed to chart.

== Other charted songs ==
Title	Year	Peak chart positions					Album
Title	Year	US	US R&B/HH	US R&B	BEL (FL) Tip	NZ Hot	Album
"Rise"	2016	—	—	25	—	—	A Seat at the Table
"Weary"	2016	—	— (Note: "Weary" did not enter the Billboard Hot R&B/Hip-Hop Songs, but peaked at number nine on the Bubbling Under R&B/Hip-Hop Singles chart.)	19	—	—	A Seat at the Table
"Mad" (featuring Lil Wayne)	2016	— (Note: "Mad" did not enter the Billboard Hot 100, but peaked at number nine on the Bubbling Under Hot 100 chart.)	45	17	—	—	A Seat at the Table
"Don't Touch My Hair" (featuring Sampha)	2016	91	38	14	—	—	A Seat at the Table
"F.U.B.U." (featuring The-Dream and BJ the Chicago Kid)	2016	—	—	22	—	—	A Seat at the Table
"Things I Imagined"	2019	—	—	24	—	—	When I Get Home
"Down with the Clique"	2019	—	—	23	—	—	When I Get Home
"Way to the Show"	2019	—	—	20	—	—	When I Get Home
"Stay Flo"	2019	—	—	16	22	23	When I Get Home
"Dreams"	2019	—	—	21	—	—	When I Get Home
"Almeda" (featuring Playboi Carti)	2019	— (Note: "Almeda" did not enter the Billboard Hot 100, but peaked at number 18 on the Bubbling Under Hot 100 chart.)	— (Note: "Almeda" did not enter the Billboard Hot R&B/Hip-Hop Songs, but peaked at number two on the Bubbling Under R&B/Hip-Hop Singles chart.)	12	—	18	When I Get Home
"—" denotes items that failed to chart.

== Music videos ==
Year	Music video	Director
2003	"Feelin' You (Part II)"	Sanaa Hamri
2008	"I Decided"	Melina Matsoukas
2008	"Sandcastle Disco"	Solange Knowles
2009	"T.O.N.Y."	Solange Knowles and Va$htie
2010	"Momma Loves Baby"	Yo Gabba Gabba
2012	"Losing You"	Melina Matsoukas
2013	"Locked in Closets" (mini-version)	Alan Del Rio Ortiz
2013	"Lovers in the Parking Lot"	Solange Knowles, Peter J. Brant and Emily Kai Bock
2016	"Cranes in the Sky"	Alan Ferguson and Solange Knowles
2016	"Don't Touch My Hair"	Alan Ferguson and Solange Knowles
2019	"Almeda"	Solange Knowles
2019	"Binz"	Solange Knowles
2019	"Way to the Show"	Solange Knowles
2019	"Beltway"	Autumn Knight
2019	"Things I Imagined / Down with the Clique"	Solange Knowles

== Other appearances ==
Year	Song	Album	Album artist
2001	"Little Drummer Boy" (Destiny's Child featuring Solange)	8 Days of Christmas	Destiny's Child
2001	"Proud Family" (Solange featuring Destiny's Child)	8 Days of Christmas	Destiny's Child
2001	"Solo Star"	Osmosis Jones (soundtrack)	Various artists
2002	"Simply Deep" (Kelly Rowland featuring Solange)	Simply Deep	Kelly Rowland
2002	"Hey Goldmember" (Beyoncé featuring Devin and Solange)	Austin Powers in Goldmember (OST)	Various artists
2003	"Don't Fight the Feeling" (featuring Papa Reu)	The Fighting Temptations (OST)	Various artists
2004	"Freedom"	Johnson Family Vacation (OST)	Various artists
2006	"Solo Star"	Bring It On: All or Nothing (OST)	Various artists
2007	"Twinkle Twinkle Little Star"	Baby Jamz Presents: Nursery Rhymes, Volume 1	Solange
2007	"Wheels on the Bus"	Baby Jamz Presents: Nursery Rhymes, Volume 1	Solange
2007	"Hush Little Baby"	Baby Jamz Presents: Nursery Rhymes, Volume 1	Solange
2007	"Brahm's Lullaby"	Baby Jamz Presents: Nursery Rhymes, Volume 1	Solange
2007	"There Was an Old Lady Who Lived in a Shoe"	Baby Jamz Presents: Nursery Rhymes, Volume 1	Solange
2007	"Buckle My Shoe"	Baby Jamz Presents: Nursery Rhymes, Volume 1	Solange
2007	"Bingo"	Baby Jamz Presents: Nursery Rhymes, Volume 1	Solange
2007	"Mary Had a Little Lamb"	Baby Jamz Presents: Nursery Rhymes, Volume 1	Solange
2007	"Old MacDonald Had a Farm"	Baby Jamz Presents: Nursery Rhymes, Volume 1	Solange
2007	"Skip to My Lou"	Baby Jamz Presents: Nursery Rhymes, Volume 1	Solange
2007	"This Old Man"	Baby Jamz Presents: Nursery Rhymes, Volume 1	Solange
2007	"Three Little Kittens"	Baby Jamz Presents: Nursery Rhymes, Volume 1	Solange
2007	"Mary Mary Quite Contrary"	Baby Jamz Presents: Nursery Rhymes, Volume 1	Solange
2009	"Stillness Is the Move" (Solange featuring Dirty Projectors)	—N/a	Solange and Dirty Projectors
2010	"Sex Karma" (Of Montreal featuring Solange)	False Priest	Of Montreal
2010	"When the Night Falls" (Chromeo featuring Solange)	Business Casual	Chromeo
2010	"Under Construction"	—N/a	Solange
2010	"Generation"	—N/a	Solange
2010	"Electric Blue"	—N/a	Solange
2010	"Calendar"	—N/a	Solange
2010	"Whipped" (Solange featuring LeToya Luckett)	—N/a	Solange
2010	"Left Side Drive" (Solange featuring Boards of Canada)	—N/a	Solange
2011	"Kenya" (Chris Taylor featuring Solange Knowles)	#MUSIC FOR RAIN Foundation	Chris Taylor and Solange
2011	"Favors"	—N/a	Solange
2012	"Twice" (Robert Glasper featuring Solange and The Roots)	Black Radio Recovered: The Remix	Robert Glasper
2014	"Lost on the Way Home" (Chromeo featuring Solange)	White Women	Chromeo
2019	"Land of Honey" (Flying Lotus featuring Solange)	Flamagra	Flying Lotus
2019	"I Think"	Igor	Tyler, the Creator
2024	"Sticky" (Tyler, the Creator featuring GloRilla, Sexyy Red and Lil Wayne)	Chromakopia	Tyler, the Creator
2024	"I Hope You Find Your Way Home"	Chromakopia	Tyler, the Creator

== Songwriting credits ==
List of songs written or co-written for other artists, showing year released and album name
Title	Year	Artist	Album
"Simply Deep" (feat. Solange)	2002	Kelly Rowland	Simply Deep
"Obsession"	2002	Kelly Rowland	Simply Deep
"Beyond Imagination"	2002	Kelly Rowland	Simply Deep
"Power from God"	2003	Ramiyah	Ramiyah
"Covered"	2003	Ramiyah	Ramiyah
"The Movement"	2004	Michelle Williams	Do You Know
"Bad Habit"	2004	Destiny's Child	Destiny Fulfilled
"Home for the Holidays"	2005	Destiny's Child	8 Days of Christmas
"Get Me Bodied"	2006	Beyoncé	B'Day
"Upgrade U" (feat. Jay-Z)	2006	Beyoncé	B'Day
"Flaws and All"	2007	Beyoncé	B'Day
"Love"	2007	Kelly Rowland	Ms. Kelly
"Like U"	2007	Trin-i-tee 5:7	T57
"We Break the Dawn"	2008	Michelle Williams	Unexpected
"Scared of Lonely"	2008	Beyoncé	I Am... Sasha Fierce
"Why Don't You Love Me"	2010	Beyoncé	I Am... Sasha Fierce
"Lost on the Way Home" (feat. Solange)	2014	Chromeo	White Women
"Cool Your Heart" (feat. Dawn Richard)	2017	Dirty Projectors	Dirty Projectors
"Land of Honey" (feat. Solange)	2019	Flying Lotus	Flamagra
"Agayu's Revelation"	2023	Summer Walker	Clear 2: Soft Life
