= Losing You (Solange song) =

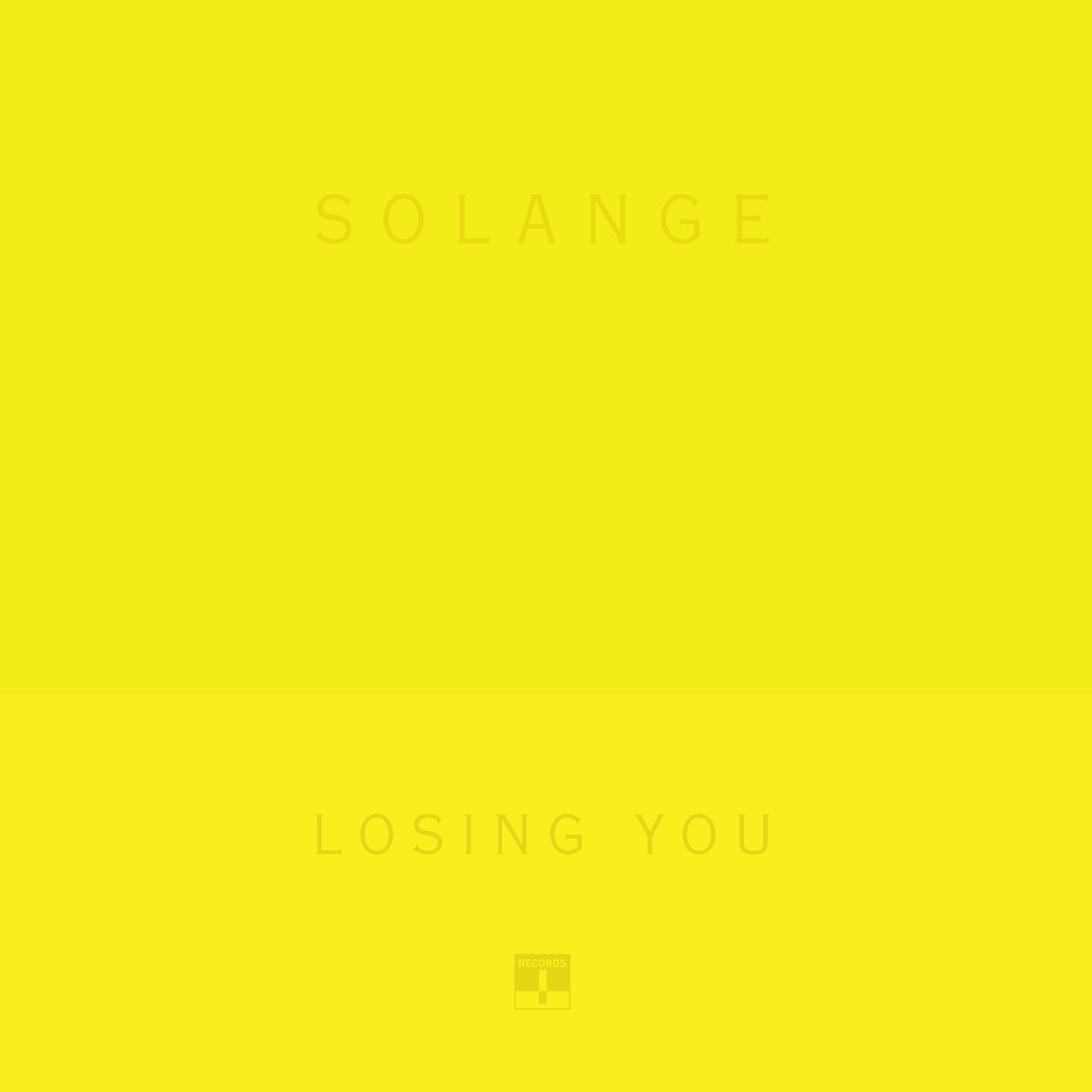

Single by Solange

from the EP True
- B-side: "Sleep in the Park"
- Released: October 2, 2012
- Genre: R&B; dance-pop; indie pop
- Length: 4:22
- Label: Terrible
- Songwriters: Solange Knowles; Dev Hynes
- Producers: Solange Knowles; Blood Orange

Solange singles chronology
"Fuck the Industry" (2010)	"Losing You" (2012)	"Looks Good with Trouble" (2013)

Music video
- "Losing You" on YouTube

"Losing You" is a song recorded by American recording artist Solange Knowles. It was written and produced by Dev Hynes and Knowles, with the former under his pseudonym Blood Orange. Serving as the lead single from her EP True, the song was first released for download on October 2, 2012 via Terrible Records, a label co-run by Grizzly Bear's Chris Taylor.

"Losing You" is a R&B, dance-pop and indie pop song with influences of electronic music. The song received universal acclaim from music critics. The single's accompanying music video was directed by Melina Matsoukas and shot at multiple locations in the township of Langa in Cape Town, South Africa. Following the release, "Losing You" reached the top ten of the single charts in Denmark, and peaked at number 22 on the UK Indie Chart.

== Background and release ==
In 2008, Knowles signed a record deal with Geffen and a publishing contract with EMI. The same year she finished working on her second studio album in 2008 and titled the project Sol-Angel and the Hadley St. Dreams. A collection of 1960s- and 1970s-influenced songs, it was considered as a departure from her pop-oriented debut upon its release in August 2008. By December 2008, the album had sold over 114,000 copies according to Nielsen Soundscan. The album was positively received by critics, some of whom considered it far better than her debut. In support of the album, Knowles began the Solange Presents Sol-Angel and the Hadley St. Dreams Tour in Britain in November 2008. The song "T.O.N.Y." was the third and final single to get lifted from the album in April 2009.

"Losing You"
Knowles stated that the song was influenced by African percussion.

In October of the same year, Knowles announced on her Twitter account, that she had parted ways with Interscope Geffen A&M after releasing just one album on the label, and further revealed that she had chosen to go an independent route with her next album, stating that "although it's been a wonderful journey and experience at Interscope Records, after truly recognizing what's important to ME as an artist, I decided it was time for me to continue my path on a more independent platform [...] I'm excited about continuing to dive in, experiment and creating music and art with no boundaries, fears or expectations. Gonna be fun folks." Knowles also confirmed that she had been experimenting with a moody, electronic sound for her next project. She confirmed that "Losing You" would be the first single in an interview with the South African Sunday Times on September 2, 2012. Knowles described the song "eclectic with '80s references and African percussion influences." The track premiered along with the video on October 1, 2012. The single was released to iTunes a day later.

== Critical response ==
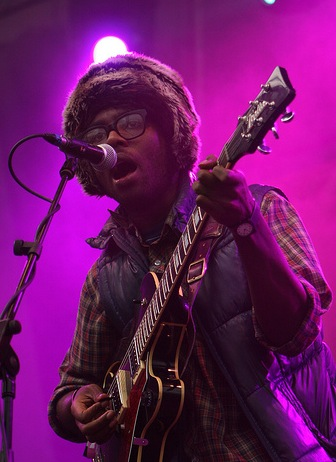
"Losing You" was generally praised for its production, which was helmed by Dev Hynes.

The song has received acclaim by critics. Luke O'Neil of The Boston Globe called it "'80s dance-pop-heartbreak in the early Janet Jackson mold." Philip Sherburne of Spin magazine called "Losing You" a "remarkable song in its own right, with a breezy fusion of singer-centric R&B, 1980s pop, and lanky, mid-tempo hip house beats." He felt the song was breakaway from the "R&B-gone-electronic dance music tracks" and commented that it was also "remarkable for what it suggests about the direction of pop music right now; it feels like one of those moments when something lurking just below the surface of the zeitgeist breaks through in a big way." He further noted that "there's plenty of mediocrity in the wannabe-Balearic house scene too, but in the hands of Solange and Hynes, it feels like a breath of fresh air."

Gerrick D. Kennedy of the Los Angeles Times described "Losing You" as "a sticky mid-tempo dance-R&B cut that pushes her further away from unfair comparisons." He commented that the song was "not the overwrought 4/4 dance-R&B that's flooded radio for the past couple of years. Knowles and Hynes crafted the sort of snappy, relaxed groove that sounds as if it had been unearthed from a dusty '80s jukebox. The single is retro without reverting to the Motown influences of her last record." Eve Barlow of NME noted the considerable online popularity of the track, which employs "R&B handclaps and harmonies, and rests upon the synths of an OMD classic".

=== Accolades ===
Pitchfork named "Losing You" the 16th best song of 2012, while Digital Spy named the song the seventh. It was also voted the seventh best single of 2012 by The Village Voice's 40th annual Pazz & Jop critics' poll. Spin listed the song on their "40 Best Songs of 2012" ranking, and wrote: "The exquisitely triumphant melancholy of a permanent weirdo-R&B underdog finally finding her lane (Manhattan opulence crossed with Brooklyn ennui), finally feeling that reassuring pavement beneath her, gunning it to 120 MPH, turning chilling emotional isolation into a raging Bushwick house party." The Huffington Post named "Losing You" one of the 15 best songs of the year.

== Music video ==
=== Filming and release ===
The music video for "Losing You" was directed by Melina Matsoukas and shot at multiple locations in the township of Langa in Cape Town, South Africa in the first week of September 2012. Initially supposed to be shot in Brazzaville, filming eventually had to be moved to Cape Town to coincide with Knowles's shoot with the local Elle magazine November issue. Partly inspired by Italian photographer Daniele Tamagni's book Gentlemen of Bacongo, which documents La Sape ("Society for the Advancement of People of Elegance"), the original idea of the video had been to pay tribute to the fashions in the Republic of the Congo. Throughout filming, the concept was altered however as the original idea was considered "too complicated" to visualize. Photographed without both Knowles and Matsoukas having a "real firm concept in place," the former described filming as "sort of a grab a camera and let's go moment," capturing "the vibe of our friendship and all of the crazy escapades we've gotten ourselves into all over the world." Knowles stated the video aimed for a "documentary style" at locations around the city and that locations were largely inspired by the colour in the architecture and townships around.

Styled by Ty Hunter and selected by Elle South Africa fashion director Asanda Sizaniwas, Knowles wears fashion by Suno, Kenzo, Diane von Fürstenberg, Opening Ceremony, and J. Crew in the visuals. In the video, Knowles dances and sings in people's kitchens, barbershops and a tailoring shop, takes a 15-seater taxi, rides a bike around a neighborhood, and swims in a community pool. Designer Lizzy Okpo, one half of the William Okpo clothing line and a close friend of Knowles, makes a short appearance in the video. Tamagni reportedly guided the crew while filming. The full music video premiered on October 1, 2012 on Pitchfork. The video interprets the diasporic influence of Europe within Africa, by placing images of union jacks – among other references – throughout the treatment.

=== Reception ===
Knowles along with members of La Sape, as seen in "Losing You".

The video garnered a highly positive reception by reviewers. Rachel Brodsky of MTV's Buzzworthy Blog noted that the "super-stylish video takes a cinematic, yet nonchalant tone that we're certain only Solange could pull off," and added, that the team was "blown away by this series of looks" in the clip. Gerrick D. Kennedy of the Los Angeles Times music blog wrote that the song was "best enjoyed with its accompanying video", which he described as a "lush clip [...] set in a sartorial dream of bold colors, Knowles’ chic styles — and a bevy of fine gentlemen known as Les Sapeurs." Julee Wilson from The Huffington Post found the video "as good as we thought it would be" after watching the teaser video and wrote that "from bright power suits, to cheeky hot pants paired with colorful cardigans, the duo have created a visual feast that is fully feeding our sartorial souls. Not that we'd expect anything less from our favorite style star."

E! Online's John Boone compared the video to previous clips by Knowles' elder sister Beyoncé, writing that "Solange doesn't have to be omni-bootylicious or perform insane choreography in even more insane heels (in reality, she just bops along to the beat, how relatable is that?!). She gets to focus her energy on being awesome and wearing awesome floral cardigans and having awesome times with her awesome friends." Its concept was also likened to Janet Jackson's "Got 'til It's Gone" video. VIBE Vixen writer Krystal Holmes noted that "Knowles' comeback song 'Losing You' gives us a visual that exceeds expectations for any viewers artistic eye. Cape Town surely had a field day when Solange and her newfound crew arrived to show off all sides of their youth. Bike riding, jumping into pools and dancing in the streets make for a playful video."

== Track listing ==
Download

1. "Losing You" – 4:22
2. "Sleep in the Park" – 3:00
3. "Sleep in the Park" (Twin Shadow remodel; featuring D'Angelo Lacy) – 4:59

== Credits and personnel ==
Credits adapted from the liner notes of True.

- Songwriting – Solange Knowles, Dev Hynes
- Production – Knowles, Dev Hynes
- Recording – Mikaelin "Blue" Bluespruce
- Mixing – Mikaelin Bluespruce
- Mixing assistance – Ariel Rechtshaid, Chris Taylor
- Mastering – Joe La Porta

== Chart performance ==
Chart (2012–13)	Peak position
Australia Urban (ARIA)	26
Belgium (Ultratip Bubbling Under Flanders)	4
Belgium (Ultratip Bubbling Under Wallonia)	37
Denmark (Tracklisten)	9
France (SNEP)	38
UK Independent (Official Charts Company)	10

== Covers ==
In 2021, British singer Will Young covered "Losing You" on his album Crying on the Bathroom Floor.

== Certifications ==
Certifications for "Losing You"
Region	Certification	Certified units/sales
New Zealand (RMNZ)	Gold	15,000^{‡}
^{‡} Sales+streaming figures based on certification alone.

== Release history ==
List of release dates, showing country, record label, and format
Region	Date	Format
United States	October 2, 2012	Digital download
United States	November 6, 2012	Vinyl
