= True (EP) =

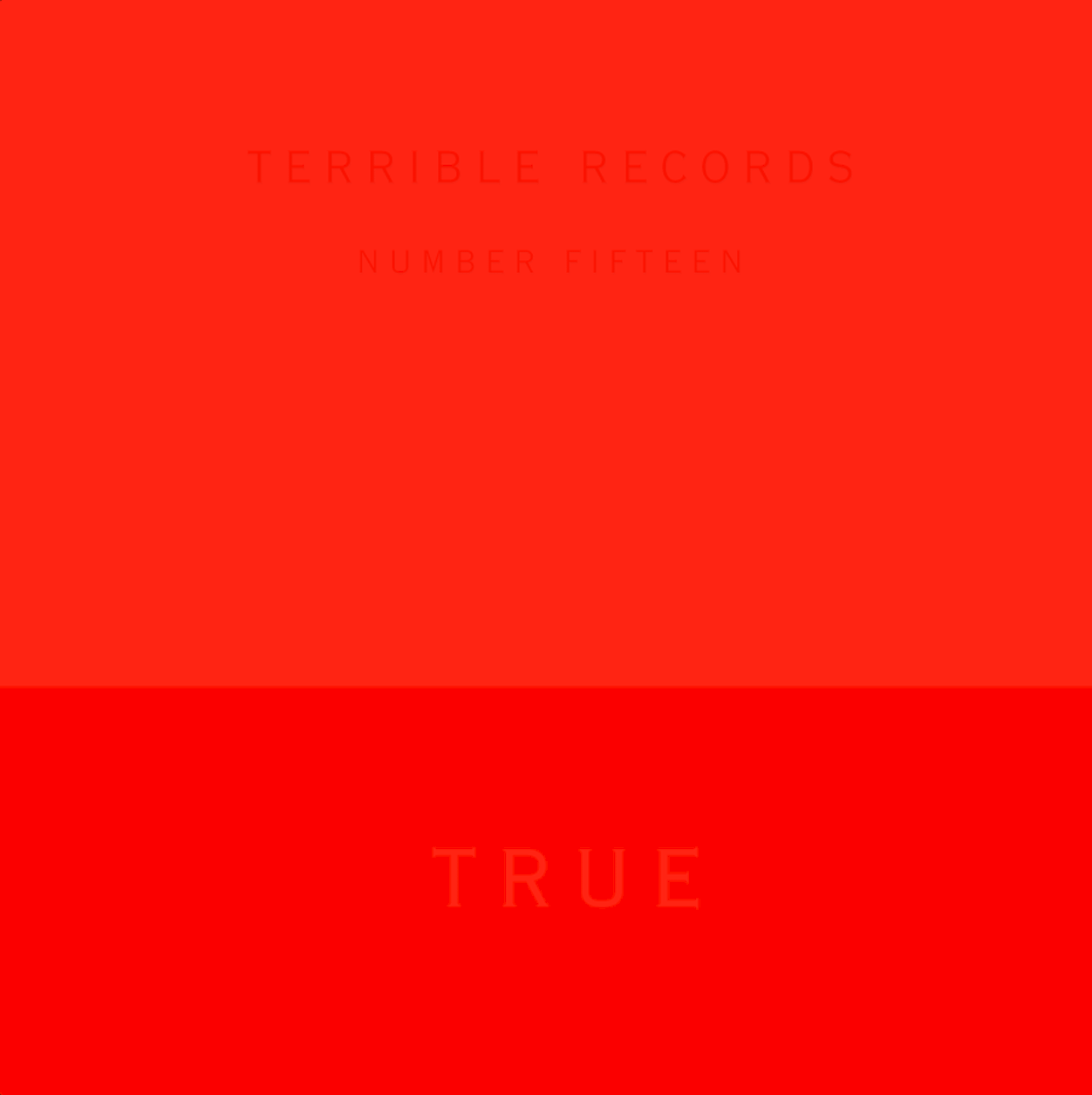
- The text reads: "Terrible Records - Number Fifteen" and "True" on the bottom half.

EP by Solange
- Released: November 27, 2012
- Recorded: 2012
- Genre: Neo soul
- Length: 27:54
- Label: Terrible
- Producers: Solange Knowles; Dev Hynes

Solange chronology
Sol-Angel and the Hadley St. Dreams (2008)	True (2012)	A Seat at the Table (2016)

Alternative cover
- Limited edition cover, also used on digital and streaming platforms

Singles from True
- 1. "Losing You" Released: October 1, 2012; 2. "Looks Good with Trouble" Released: May 14, 2013; 3. "Lovers in the Parking Lot" Released: September 18, 2013

True is the first extended play (EP) by American singer and songwriter Solange Knowles, first released on November 27, 2012 digitally through Terrible Records. Following the release of her second studio album Sol-Angel and the Hadley St. Dreams (2008), Solange announced that she had parted ways with Interscope Geffen A&M after releasing just one album on the label, and further revealed that she had chosen to go an independent route, eventually signing with Terrible Records. In 2009, Solange began the recording of a studio album, during which she suffered a "breakdown" due to the amount of time and emotion she was putting into the recording process.

A neo soul album, True contains an eclectic sound that takes influence from PBR&B, new wave music, dance, 1980s pop, and electronica, whilst the extended play's production is characterized as containing '80s references, keyboards and African percussion. The recording process took three years and was handled by Solange and producer Dev Hynes. Together the pair produced, wrote and composed all of the songs, a decision Solange made due to their chemistry, friendship and work relationship.

Upon release True received generally positive reviews from music critics. Commercially, the EP debuted at number 157 on the US Billboard 200 as well as charting within the top sixty of the albums charts in Denmark and Sweden. The album was promoted with the release of three singles including "Losing You" and was further promoted with a tour of the United States, United Kingdom, Netherlands, France and Germany.

== Background ==
In 2007, Knowles signed a record deal with Geffen and a publishing contract with EMI. The following year, she finished working on her second studio album Sol-Angel and the Hadley St. Dreams. A collection of 1960s- and 1970s-influenced songs, it was considered a departure from her R&B-oriented debut upon its release in August 2008. By December 2008, the album had sold over 114,000 copies according to Nielsen SoundScan. The album was positively received by critics, some of whom considered it far better than her debut. In support of the album, Knowles began the Solange Presents Sol-Angel and the Hadley St. Dreams Tour in Britain in November 2008. The song "T.O.N.Y." was the third and final single to be lifted from the album in April 2009.

In October of the same year, Knowles announced on her Twitter account that she had parted ways with Interscope Geffen A&M after releasing just one album on the label, and further revealed that she had chosen to go independent with her next album, stating that "although it's been a wonderful journey and experience at Interscope Records, after truly recognizing what's important to ME as an artist, I decided it was time for me to continue my path on a more independent platform [...] I'm excited about continuing to dive in, experiment and creating music and art with no boundaries, fears or expectations. Gonna be fun folks."

== Recording ==
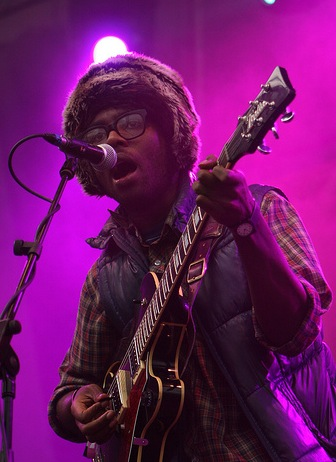
All the songs from the EP were produced by Dev Hynes.

In an interview with Vibe on July 7, 2010, Knowles said she suffered "a little bit of a breakdown" while recording her new album: "I literally gave up my sanity for a while to do this record. [...] We literally were waking up in the morning and just making music all day and all night. [...] It just started to wear on me in so many different ways. I started having these crazy panic attacks." Solange explained how she made sacrifices "mentally, emotionally and financially", and continued, "It's more than an album to me. It's a transitional time in my life." Regarding the musical direction of the album, she said the inspiration came from new wave and stated, "This is a dance record, but the lyrics can get pretty dark at times."

The extended play was recorded in five cities including Santa Barbara, Los Angeles, Houston, New York City, and on the German autobahn. Dev Hynes began work with Theophilus London, who called Solange stating that he had just been working on a record with Hynes and thought she should have been a part of it. Following the call, Solange visited Theophilus at the studio, where she met Dev and after hearing his music, the two embarked on a friendship and a working relationship. Solange stated that the EP's recording process was done over a two-year period, but the first six months was a period where Solange and Dev Hynes swapped ideas and established a cohesive sound. Over the next two years, the pair co-wrote and co-produced thirty songs, with "Locked in Closets" and "Don't Let Me Down" being the first two songs to be recorded.

During the recording of True, Knowles worked with Pharrell Williams amongst other producers, however the songs were never used for the extended play. Whilst in Santa Barbara, where the pair first started to work together, they were experimenting with different sounds, different sonics and different collaborators. There were other producers who were working with them and Solange stated "it just became really clear to me that the music me and Dev were creating together was very special, and from then I just transitioned into wanting Dev to produce the record." Whilst recording True, Knowles took influence from production duo Jimmy Jam and Terry Lewis, known for their work with Janet Jackson as well as listening to large amounts of SOS Band and Chaka Khan, records that were also produced by Jimmy Jam.

== Music and lyrics ==
The EP is straight-up termite R&B '80s revivalism, with nihilistic Jan Hammer programming, Prince-protégée synth squiggles, and a beat halfway between freestyle and Miami bass. Solange's vocals never strain for effect, but rather roll over for the opposite, which is an odd but endearing stance

— Eric Henderson, Slant Magazine.

Consisting of seven tracks, True is primarily in the neo soul genre but contains an eclectic sound that takes influence from R&B, new wave music, dance, 1980s pop, and electronica. Knowles stated she was inspired by new wave music and that "this is a dance record, but the lyrics can get pretty dark at times." During an interview Solange confirmed that she had been experimenting with a moody, electronic sound for her next project. Nick Levine of the BBC compared the extended play to the work of Madonna and described its music structure as a "tribute to early 80s pop-RnB music", stating the EP's production contains sweet keyboard sounds and beats that sound like that of a "battered old Casio drum machine."

A reviewer from Pitchfork described the songs as having no huge choruses but instead "its hooks bubble up quietly and quickly, then dissipate as the songs return to their downbeat simmer". The same reviewer stated that Hynes plays with non-traditional structures, letting the songs meander in and out of grooves. The album was described as containing no "filler" and an accessible and authentic piece of pop. The EP's songs have a diaphanous new wave via synth funk sound that was compared to the work of Little Dragon by Andy Kellman of AllMusic. The lyrical content of the album details a relationship gone wrong that "provide[s] aching, wistful, and frustrated contrast to the animated and slowly swaying backdrops" according to Kellman from AllMusic.

== Songs ==
The opening track and lead single "Losing You" is a R&B song with pop and electronic music, described as having a "pleasantly upbeat" sound that lyrically speaks about love that has become complicated. Philip Sherburne of Spin magazine called "Losing You" a "remarkable song in its own right, with a breezy fusion of singer-centric R&B, 1980s pop, and lanky, mid-tempo hip house beats." He felt the song was breakaway from the "R&B-gone-electronic dance music tracks" and commented that it was also "remarkable for what it suggests about the direction of pop music right now; it feels like one of those moments when something lurking just below the surface of the zeitgeist breaks through in a big way."

The second track "Some Things Never Seem to Fucking Work" is lyrically about "ultimatums and questions, Solange ponders the illusion of a relationship". "Locked in Closets" was described as having a beat "reminiscent of Michael Jackson in his 'Smooth Criminal' prime", and continues the theme of "addictive love". The fourth song "Lovers in the Parking Lot" is a soulful pop song with "futuristic and tropical" sounds and production, containing a slow tempo with a piano riff in which Solange "regretfully admits she played around with somebody's heart". "Don't Let Me Down" was described as "playful, with an aggressive beat" and described as setting the "foundation for a hip-hop track". Speaking about "Don't Let Me Down", Solange said;

It really encompasses a few different elements for me that are really personal. When I was writing the song, I was just thinking about a certain space in my relationship. And what’s really interesting about the record is that, previous to Dev coming and being a part of it, I was having a pretty difficult time writing because it was my first time writing in a space of content and being in a settled and stable relationship. Pretty much all of my other writing experiences were coming from a place of sadness or anger or confusion, and so that song is really special because it was in my own little way being able to express that but it still has a hint of confusion to it as well.

"Looks Good with Trouble" is a PBR&B song that has been compared to the work of the Weeknd containing minimalist and sleek production, with heavy synths and echos. The song begins heavy on the bass, reverb, and sultry harmonies, but the methodical approach ends rather abruptly. The EP's final track "Bad Girls" (Verdine Version) contains a falsetto and was described as an "unapologetic tune". Like the previous song, "Bad Girls" (Verdine Version) is a PBR&B song, the song has a funkier bass line and synths, with the song again adopting a confessional tone that is both disconnected and restricted.

== Release and promotion ==
Knowles previewed the seven-track EP in New York City on October 24, 2012 to positive reviews. Knowles and Dev Hynes hosted a second listening party at Sonos Studio in Los Angeles on November 27, the date of the EP's digital release.

New York-based artist Mickalene Thomas is responsible for the EP's visual presentation. The limited-edition version of "True" was released on March 11, 2013. Thomas described the limited edition artwork as a collage which was shot at the Lehmann Maupin gallery located in the SoHo section of New York City. When asked about the creative process she detailed recomposing the photographs with materials such as Color-aid, vintage wallpaper, and some old drawings from her days as a student at Yale University. She also noted her attention to detail for texture and color. Thomas also designed the set for the EP's lead single, "Losing You" music video; a set which Solange referred to as "brilliant". When asked about it she described the project as a "very cool experience!" and noted researching images of Solange to identify what particular style she would create. To assure how hands-on she was with the design she stated, "I design every last inch—down to the outlets, faux flowers, books, and records—as they create a cohesive setting and context. No detail is overlooked."

"Losing You" was released in preparation of the album and was written by Dev Hynes and Knowles, with production helmed by the former under his pseudonym Blood Orange along with Kevin Barnes. Serving as the lead single from the album, the song was released for digital download on October 2, 2012 and on November 6, 2012 on vinyl via Terrible Records, a label co-run by Grizzly Bear's Chris Taylor. In May 2013, Knowles premiered the remix of her song "Look Good with Trouble" featuring Kendrick Lamar; she then revealed it would be the second single from the EP, and stated the original was "only an opener" for "Bad Girls". "Look Good with Trouble" was released as the second single from the EP on May 14, 2013. The third and final single "Lovers in the Parking Lot" was released on September 18, 2013.

Knowles announced a small tour in promotion of True and to celebrate her return to music. It was her first tour since 2009.

True Promo Tour
Date	City	Country	Venue
December 11, 2012	New York City	United States	Bowery Ballroom
January 16, 2013	London	United Kingdom	XOYO
January 17, 2013	London	United Kingdom	XOYO
January 18, 2013	Paris	France	Nouveau Casino
January 19, 2013	Amsterdam	Netherlands	Bitterzoet
January 20, 2013	Berlin	Germany	Prince Charles Nightclub

== Critical reception ==
Professional ratings
Aggregate scores
Source	Rating
AnyDecentMusic?	7.7/10
Metacritic	79/100
Review scores
Source	Rating
AllMusic	3.5/5 stars
The A.V. Club	A−
Consequence of Sound	C−
Entertainment Weekly	B+
Los Angeles Times	3.5/4 stars
NME	8/10
Pitchfork	7.8/10
Rolling Stone	2.5/5 stars
Slant Magazine	3/5 stars
Spin	8/10

True received generally favorable reviews from critics. At Metacritic, which assigns a normalized rating out of 100 to reviews from mainstream publications, the album received an average score of 79, based on 16 reviews. Sam Wolfson of NME wrote: "The 26-year-old is not a hit-making pop star, but an antidote to pop homogenisation; something that sounds different to everything on the radio, but could still be on the radio. On that front, True delivers." Paste called it "funky" and noted its "bold synths" as "sound[ing] like '80s-era Madonna". Entertainment Weekly praised the album, saying "The strong '80s Nostalgia here could wear thin for some, but Solange's singular charms stretch far".

== Commercial performance ==
True first charted in Denmark on the Tracklisten chart, peaking at number forty. The EP also charted on the Swedish albums chart (Sverigetopplistan) at number fifty-seven, and reached 164 on the French albums chart. In the United States the EP debuted at 157 on the Billboard 200, becoming Solange's third release to chart but her first not to reach the top fifty.

== Track listing ==
The track listing was announced by Rap-Up magazine on October 25, 2012.

All tracks are written by Solange Knowles and Dev Hynes.

No.	Title	Length
1.	"Losing You"	4:20
2.	"Some Things Never Seem to Fucking Work"	4:57
3.	"Locked in Closets"	3:22
4.	"Lovers in the Parking Lot"	4:22
5.	"Don't Let Me Down"	4:13
6.	"Look Good with Trouble"	1:30
7.	"Bad Girls" (Verdine Version)	5:10

== Personnel ==
Credits for True adapted from AllMusic.

- Solange Knowles – vocals, producer, writer (all tracks)
- Dev Hynes – producer, writer (all tracks), additional background vocals
- Chris Egan – live drums (on "Locked in Closets" and "Don't Let Me Down")
- Verdine White – bass (on "Bad Girls")
- Mikaelin 'Blue' Bluespruce – album engineer (Lounge Studios, NYC)
- Rommel Nino Villanueva – additional engineering (on "Locked in Closets", "Don't Let Me Down" and "Bad Girls")
- Chris Taylor – additional mixing (on "Losing You")
- Ariel Rechtshaid – additional mixing (on "Losing You" and "Bad Girls")
- Joe LaPorta – album mastering (Lounge Studios, NYC)

== Charts ==
Chart (2012–13)	Peak position
Danish Albums (Tracklisten)	40
French Albums (SNEP)	164
Swedish Albums (Sverigetopplistan)	57
US Billboard 200	157
US Top R&B/Hip-Hop Albums (Billboard)	17

== See also ==
- Solange discography
