= I Decided =

I Decided may refer to:

- I Decided (album), a studio album by Big Sean
- "I Decided" (song), a 2008 single by Solange
