= Fuck the Industry =

2010 single by Solange

- Dance Remixes digital cover

Single by Solange

from the album Sol-Angel and the Hadley St. Dreams (2015 edition)
- Released: May 25, 2010
- Recorded: 2008
- Genre: Hip hop soul
- Length: 3:48
- Label: Music World
- Songwriters: Solange Knowles; Kanye West; George Clinton, Jr.; Prince Phillip Mitchell; Carlton Ridenhour; Eric Sadler; Hank Shocklee
- Producer: Kanye West

Solange singles chronology
"T.O.N.Y." (2009)	"Fuck the Industry" (2010)	"Losing You" (2012)

"Fuck the Industry" (censored as "F**k the Industry") is a song recorded by American singer Solange. The song leaked online in 2008 and was reported to be part of a mixtape recorded by Solange called I Can't Get Clearance. However, the mixtape was never released and the song received an official release in 2010. The song was released to digital music stores on May 25, 2010, on her father Mathew Knowles's Music World Entertainment, after Solange was dropped by Geffen Records and received no promotion. The single includes remixes of "Fuck the Industry" and remixes of two songs from Sol-Angel and the Hadley St. Dreams. The song's main sample comes from American rapper and producer Kanye West's "Everything I Am" from his third studio album, Graduation (2007).

The song's lyrics deal with Solange wanting to be her own person/artist individually and makes references to fellow female R&B artists such as her famous older sister, Mary J. Blige, Ashanti, Keyshia Cole and Jennifer Lopez.

== Track listing ==
- Digital download (Dance Remixes)
1. "Fuck the Industry" (DJ Escape/Coluccio Main) – 7:34
2. "Fuck the Industry" (DJ Escape/Coluccio Dub) – 6:20
3. "Fuck the Industry" (Lost Daze remix) – 6:33
4. "Fuck the Industry" (Lost Daze edit) – 3:43
5. "6 O'Clock Blues" (Whatever Wherever Mix) – 7:41
6. "6 O'Clock Blues" (Whatever Wherever Radio) – 4:05
7. "Cosmic Journey" (Matty's Club Mix) – 8:34
8. "Cosmic Journey" (Matty's Radio) – 4:11

== Charts ==
Chart (2010)	Peak position
US Dance Club Songs (Billboard)	6

== Release history ==
Region	Date	Format	Label	Ref.
United States	May 25, 2010	Digital download (Dance Remixes)	Music World	
