= Sandcastle Disco =

- 2009 Remixes EP cover

Single by Solange

from the album Sol-Angel and the Hadley St. Dreams
- Released: August 15, 2008
- Recorded: 2007
- Length: 4:28
- Label: Music World; Geffen
- Songwriters: Solange Knowles; Carsten Schack; Kenneth Karlin; Thomas Callaway
- Producer: Soulshock & Karlin

Solange singles chronology
"I Decided" (2008)	"Sandcastle Disco" (2008)	"T.O.N.Y." (2009)

"Sandcastle Disco" is a song by American recording artist Solange Knowles taken from her second album, Sol-Angel and the Hadley St. Dreams (2008). It is produced by Soulshock & Karlin, who also wrote the song together with Knowles and Cee-Lo Green and was released as the album's second single in August 2008.

== Release ==
The song was released in the US in August 2008, but failed to receive a radio adds date, and thrived off moderate digital downloads and her promotional appearances, including debuting the video on TRL. Solange heavily promoted the song in the US with performances on the Late Show with David Letterman in late August and Jimmy Kimmel Live! in September.

The single received major airplay on UK music channels but did not pick up significant airplay on radio formats. She promoted the song on The Paul O'Grady Show and Later... with Jools Holland in November 2008. Due to limited radio airplay, the single failed to chart on downloads alone in the proceeded weeks before the release date.

On December 20, 2008, the song notched the number one spot on the US Billboard Hot Dance Club Play chart.

== Music video ==
The music video is the directorial debut of Solange Knowles. The video was almost entirely made using computer-generated imagery, and features abundant stage and costume changes.

The video begins with Solange singing and dancing in a white room in a blue dress in front of her band. Then in the background CGI clouds appear, and Solange draws a sun with her hand, setting the stage for the video. Next she makes bricks appear and disappear, while palm trees spring up on the sides of the room, continuing to set the video's stage. Solange then plays with some hearts and lets out a rainbow ball that wraps around the room.

Next, Solange jumps onto a life-sized CGI keyboard (wearing a yellow dress), and plays it with her feet. Solange next jumps to a drum set, where she again plays the instrument with her feet. Solange then lies atop of a stringed instrument, and then slides down a microphone (like a firemen's pole) and moves to the next stage. The sun sets and a moon rises as Solange (wearing a brown dress) sits atop of a can of "Solange's, Can I Sing" (parody of Campbell's) Soup. Solange leaves the soup (wearing a gray dress) and returns to the sunlit stage and draws different things (headphones, musical notes, hearts), before flinging them towards herself on the next stage.

Now in a new yellow dress, Solange sings in front of a pastel-colored background, multiplies herself, dances, and then leaps onto a large record-player. She runs laps on the record, and spells out the lyrics "Ba Ba B B Baby", before moving to Solange (in a copper/beige dress) in front of an ocean background. Now in the background, large CGI balloons appear, and Solange grabs hold of one and flies up. Solange then lets go and lands back in front of her band (in a black/yellow feathered dress) singing in front of a CGI elephant, balloons, mushroom, and octopus, as her backing singers join her. Confetti falls around the room as Solange finishes the song and then walks off as the video fades.

== Formats and track listings ==
UK CD single

1. "Sandcastle Disco" (UK radio edit) – 3:20
2. "Sandcastle Disco" (Freemasons club mix) – 9:00

US Remixes EP

1. "Sandcastle Disco" (Freemasons club mix) – 9:00
2. "Sandcastle Disco" (Karmatronic club mix) – 7:50
3. "Sandcastle Disco" (Gomi main mix) – 9:13
4. "Sandcastle Disco" (Lost Daze club mix) – 5:28
5. "Sandcastle Disco" (King Britt main) – 6:52

UK digital download

1. "Sandcastle Disco" (UK radio edit) – 3:20

Australian Remixes EP

1. "Sandcastle Disco" (Freemasons club mix) – 9:00
2. "Sandcastle Disco" (Karmatronic club mix) – 7:50
3. "Sandcastle Disco" (Gomi main mix) – 9:13
4. "Sandcastle Disco" (Lost Daze club mix) – 5:28
5. "Sandcastle Disco" (King Britt main) – 6:52

Freemasons 2026 Remastered

1. "Sandcastle Disco" (Radio Edit) - 3:40
2. "Sandcastle Disco" (Club Mix) - 7:30
3. "Sandcastle Disco" (Radio Edit) [Instrumental] - 5:26
4. "Sandcastle Disco" (Club Mix) [Instrumental] - 7:30

== Charts ==
Chart (2008–09)	Peak position
UK Hip Hop/R&B (Official Charts)	26
US Dance Club Songs (Billboard)	1

== Release history ==
Region	Date	Format	Label
United States	August 15, 2008	Digital download; CD single	Geffen; Music World
Philippines	August 15, 2008	Digital download; CD single	Geffen; Music World
United Kingdom	November 24, 2008	Digital download; CD single	Polydor; Music World
United States	February 10, 2009	The Remixes EP – digital download	Geffen; Music World
Australia	April 27, 2010	The Remixes EP – digital download	Music World
