= Feelin' You (Solange song) =

Single by Solange featuring N.O.R.E.

from the album Solo Star
- Released: December 17, 2002
- Genre: R&B
- Length: 4:06 (album version); 3:46 (radio edit)
- Label: Columbia, Music World
- Songwriters: Solange Knowles; Mark Penn; Victor Santiago
- Producers: Solange Knowles; Mark Penn; Damon Elliott

Solange Knowles singles chronology
"True Love" (2002)	"Feelin' You" (2002)	"Crush" (2003)

N.O.R.E. singles chronology
"Head Bussa" (2002)	"Feelin' You" (2002)	"Crashin' a Party" (2003)

"Feelin' You" is the debut single released by American R&B singer-songwriter Solange from her debut album Solo Star.

== Track listing ==
US CD single

1. "Feelin' You (Part I w/o Rap)" - 3:22
2. "Feelin' You (Part I)" - 4:00
3. "Feelin' You (Nu Soul Dance Mix)" - 7:12
4. "Feelin' You (Club Mix)" - 9:34
5. "Feelin' You (Part II w/o Rap H-Town Screwed Mix)" - 5:07

Europe CD single

1. "Feelin' You (Part II)" - 4:06
2. "Feelin' You (Nu Soul Dance Mix)" - 7:12
3. "Feelin' You (Club Mix)" - 9:34
4. "Feelin' You (Part I)" - 4:00
5. "Feelin' You (Part II - Music Video)" - 3:58

== Charts ==
Chart (2003)	Peak position
U.S. Billboard R&B/Hip-Hop Songs	73
U.S. Billboard Maxi-Single Sales	2

== Release history ==
Region	Date	Format(s)	Label(s)	Ref.
United States	November 25, 2002	Rhythmic contemporary · urban contemporary radio	Columbia	
