= I Decided (song) =

Single by Solange

from the album Sol-Angel and the Hadley St. Dreams
- B-side: "God Given Name"
- Released: April 22, 2008
- Recorded: 2007
- Genre: Funk; electropop
- Length: 4:16
- Label: Music World; Geffen
- Songwriters: Solange Knowles; Pharrell Williams
- Producer: The Neptunes

Solange singles chronology
| "Freedom" (2004) | "I Decided" (2008) | "Sandcastle Disco" (2008) |

"I Decided" is a song by American recording artist Solange Knowles. It was written and composed by Knowles and producer Pharrell Williams for her second studio album Sol-Angel and the Hadley St. Dreams (2008). The song samples hand-claps of the 1964 recording "Where Did Our Love Go", as performed by the Supremes, and is also based on the melody of "(Love Is Like a) Heat Wave" (1963) by Martha and the Vandellas. It was released as the album's lead single as a digital download to both iTunes and Amazon on April 22, 2008, and was impacted to rhythmic/crossover radio stations on June 24, 2008.

A remix version of the song, entitled "I Decided (Part 2)", produced by the British band Freemasons, was released as the first single in Europe, where the song entered the top 30 of the UK Singles Chart. The track reached the number-one spot on the US Billboard Hot Singles Sales, Hot R&B/Hip-Hop Singles Sales, Hot Dance Singles Sales and Hot Dance Club Play charts.

== Music video ==
Solange (center) and background dancers in the video

The video was shot in April 2008 and directed by Melina Matsoukas and Solange as it shows pop culture imagery from the 1960s, shows the 1970s, then 1980s to the future. It displays Solange in settings from American Bandstand, to the Civil Rights Movement, to Soul Train, to MTV, and finally a "Cosmic Journey" future. It is set in a pop art form. As of January 15, 2018, on YouTube the original version has been watched more than 4,190,000 times. The shortened video for "I Decided, Pt. 2" has been watched more than 423,000 times.

The video debuted at #4 on MTV's TRL. On BET J it appeared at #17 on the year-end Last Call 2008! Top 50 Countdown.

== Chart performance ==
The song debuted on the Billboard Hot R&B/Hip-Hop Songs chart at number 44 in the Billboard issue dated July 5, 2008. The song also debuted at number one on the Hot Dance Singles Sales and Hot R&B/Hip-Hop Singles Sales charts and debuted at number two on the Hot Singles Sales chart.

In the United Kingdom, the song debuted at number 6 on R&B Singles Chart on August 17, 2008. In its second and third weeks the song fell to numbers 7, and 9. In its fourth and fifth weeks the song fell to number 12 and number 14. In its sixth week the song fell to number 18 and became a non-mover until falling in its eighth week to number 22. In its ninth week the song dropped to number 32. The song spent a total of 10 weeks on the UK R&B Singles Chart before leaving the chart on October 19, 2008, charting finally at number 36.

The song debuted at 27 on the UK Singles Chart. The song spent a total of four weeks on the UK Singles Chart, charting at numbers 32, 58 and 95 in its second, third, and fourth weeks. The song sold 20,000 in UK.

== Track listing and formats ==
Digital Download

1. "I Decided" - 4:16

Pt. 1 Instrumental Version

1. "I Decided, Pt. 1" (Instrumental) - 4:17

Pt. 2 Instrumental Version

1. "I Decided, Pt. 2" ((Freemasons Remix) [Instrumental]) - 4:02

Remixes - EP

1. "I Decided" (Freemasons Radio) - 3:48
2. "I Decided" (Moto Blanco Edit) - 3:39
3. "I Decided" (Mr. Mig Radio) - 4:44
4. "I Decided" (Azza Extended) - 4:55

King Britt FiveSix Mix Single

1. "I Decided" (King Britt FiveSix Mix) - 7:01

== Charts ==
| Chart (2008) | Peak position |
|---|---|
| France (SNEP) | 28 |
| Ireland (IRMA) | 49 |
| Japan Hot 100 (Billboard) | 79 |
| Scotland Singles (OCC) | 16 |
| Turkey (Turkey Top 20 Chart) | 20 |
| UK Singles (OCC) | 27 |
| UK Hip Hop/R&B (OCC) | 6 |
| US Adult R&B Songs (Billboard) | 28 |
| US Dance Club Songs (Billboard) | 1 |
| US Hot R&B/Hip-Hop Songs (Billboard) | 44 |
| US Hot Singles Sales (Billboard) | 1 |

== Release history ==
| Region | Date | Format | Label |
|---|---|---|---|
| United States | April 22, 2008 | Digital download; CD single; Maxi single | Geffen; Music World |
| United States | June 24, 2008 | Contemporary hit radio | Geffen; Music World |
| United Kingdom | August 11, 2008 | Digital download; CD single | Polydor; Music World |
