= Sol-Angel and the Hadley St. Dreams =

Studio album by Solange
- Released: August 26, 2008
- Genres: R&B; pop-soul; psychedelic soul; electronica
- Length: 58:32
- Labels: Geffen; Music World
- Producers: Bama Boyz; Freemasons; the Neptunes; Jack Splash; Square; Mark Ronson; Max Gousse; Mr. Familiar; Soulshock & Karlin; Shea Taylor; Thievery Corporation; Boards of Canada

Solange chronology
Solo Star (2002)	Sol-Angel and the Hadley St. Dreams (2008)	True (2012)

Deluxe edition cover

Singles from Sol-Angel and the Hadley St. Dreams
- 1. "I Decided" Released: April 22, 2008; 2. "ChampagneChroniKnightcap" Released: August 19, 2008; 3. "Sandcastle Disco" Released: November 25, 2008; 4. "T.O.N.Y." Released: March 31, 2009; 5. "Wanna Go Back" Released: August 17, 2010

Sol-Angel and the Hadley St. Dreams is the second studio album by American singer and songwriter Solange. It was released on August 26, 2008, by Geffen Records. Solange was heavily influenced by the "Motown Sound" of the 1960s and 1970s prior to the album's recording, prompting her to work with several like-minded producers and songwriters such as Jack Splash, CeeLo Green, Mark Ronson, and Lamont Dozier, formerly of Motown's Holland–Dozier–Holland. The production also incorporated elements of downbeat and electronic music that Solange had familiarized herself with on previous trips to Europe, while the songwriting explored themes of independence.

Departing from the dance-pop R&B of Solange's debut album Solo Star (2002), Sol-Angel and the Hadley St. Dreams was marketed toward the "intellectual, backpacking, coffee shop, digital" youth audience, as described by her record label. In its first week of release, the album charted at number nine on the Billboard 200 and sold 46,000 copies; it eventually reached 138,000 sold in the US. Meanwhile, its three singles all reached number one on the Billboard Dance Club Songs. Critically, Sol-Angel and the Hadley St. Dreams was well received, with reviewers generally finding the music ambitious, eccentric, and intelligently made.

== Background ==
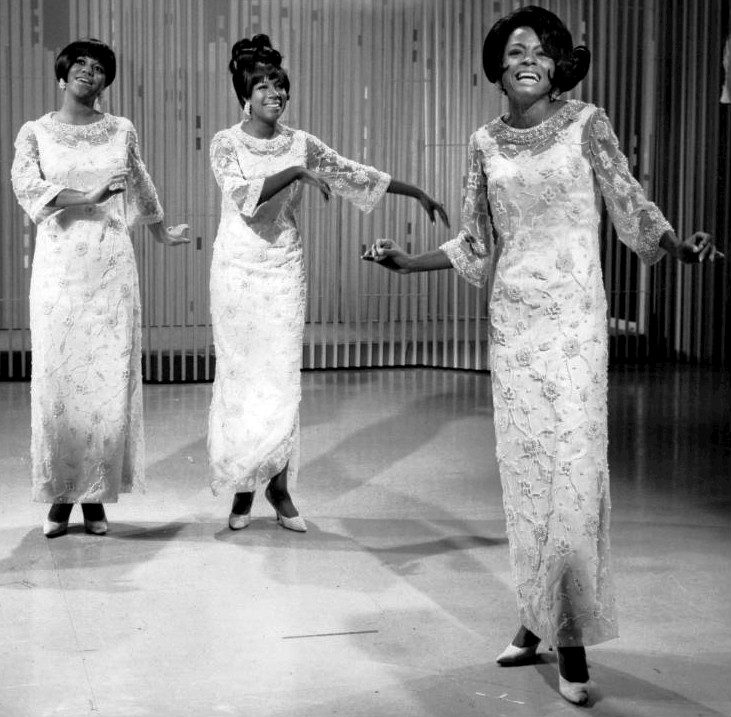
The pop-soul music of Motown girl groups like The Supremes (in 1966) inspired Solange creatively.

Solange had been working on her second studio album on and off since 2005 following her return home to Houston, Texas, and her divorce from Daniel Smith, with whom she had lived following the birth of their son Daniel Julez in October 2004. The follow-up to the critical and commercial disappointment of 2003's Solo Star was preceded by Solange's move from Columbia to Geffen Records in late 2007. Solange was heavily influenced by Motown girl groups such as The Supremes and The Marvelettes, and by her mother Tina, a one-time member of the 1960s harmony group The Veltones, who used to play music by the likes of Dusty Springfield and Martha Reeves to her.

Inspired to create a concept album around her growth as a musical artist instead, Solange borrowed elements from downbeat and electronic music she discovered on recent trips to Europe, and her vision of the album eventually resulted in a mixture she described as a "'60s/70s vintage soul record with hints of electronica." In an interview with Billboard magazine, Geffen Records chairman Ron Fair said of the album prior to release, "Her record is totally bananas ... It's not what people would expect from her. The music is more electric and international. She's in her own lane."

== Recording and production ==
"Dancing in the Dark"
The song features a 1970s funk sound and contains a thick horn sample from Heinz Kiessling's 1960s recording "Feeling Young".

Although Solange had previously worked with a wide range of high-profile producers and songwriters on earlier projects, she struggled to convince her wishlisted musicians to contribute to Sol-Angel and the Hadley St. Dreams, production-wise. This was due to no producer signing on to the project before hearing any material for the album. "I don't think it was offensive," Solange admitted. "I understand that these are people that want to take on credible passionate projects. So before I would work with them I would schedule a meeting and play them the record. And then they were more convinced and willing to get on board." Cee-Lo Green and Mark Ronson were not consulted until late into the production of the album, both having been persuaded by Solange at the 50th Grammy Awards ceremony: "I had to party with Cee-Lo too to get him to work on the record [...] but once he did [listen to my music] he signed on immediately."

Solange collaborated with several studio personalities, including Jack Splash, Shea Taylor, Mr. Familiar, Lamont Dozier, production teams Soulshock & Karlin and Bama Boyz, as well as singers and rappers Pharrell Williams, Bilal, Q-Tip and Lil Wayne respectively. In addition, Marsha Ambrosius of Floetry lent vocals to the unreleased recording "Wanna Go Back", while Raphael Saadiq and British singer Estelle demoed the track "Same Song, Different Man", which did not make it to the final track listing. In an interview with Starpulse, Solange later said of the experience:

"By the end of the project, I had worked with all of the producers and artists I had ever dreamed of including Q-Tip, Boards of Canada and Mark Ronson ... When I got a call saying the legendary Lamont Dozier would take the time out to write with little old me I was ecstatic beyond words."

Inspired by the aspirations of Solange's father Mathew, the album was titled after Hadley Street, a plot of land in downtown Houston. This became the location of Matthew's Music World Entertainment complex (1505 Hadley), where Solange says she began working on the album.

== Marketing and sales ==
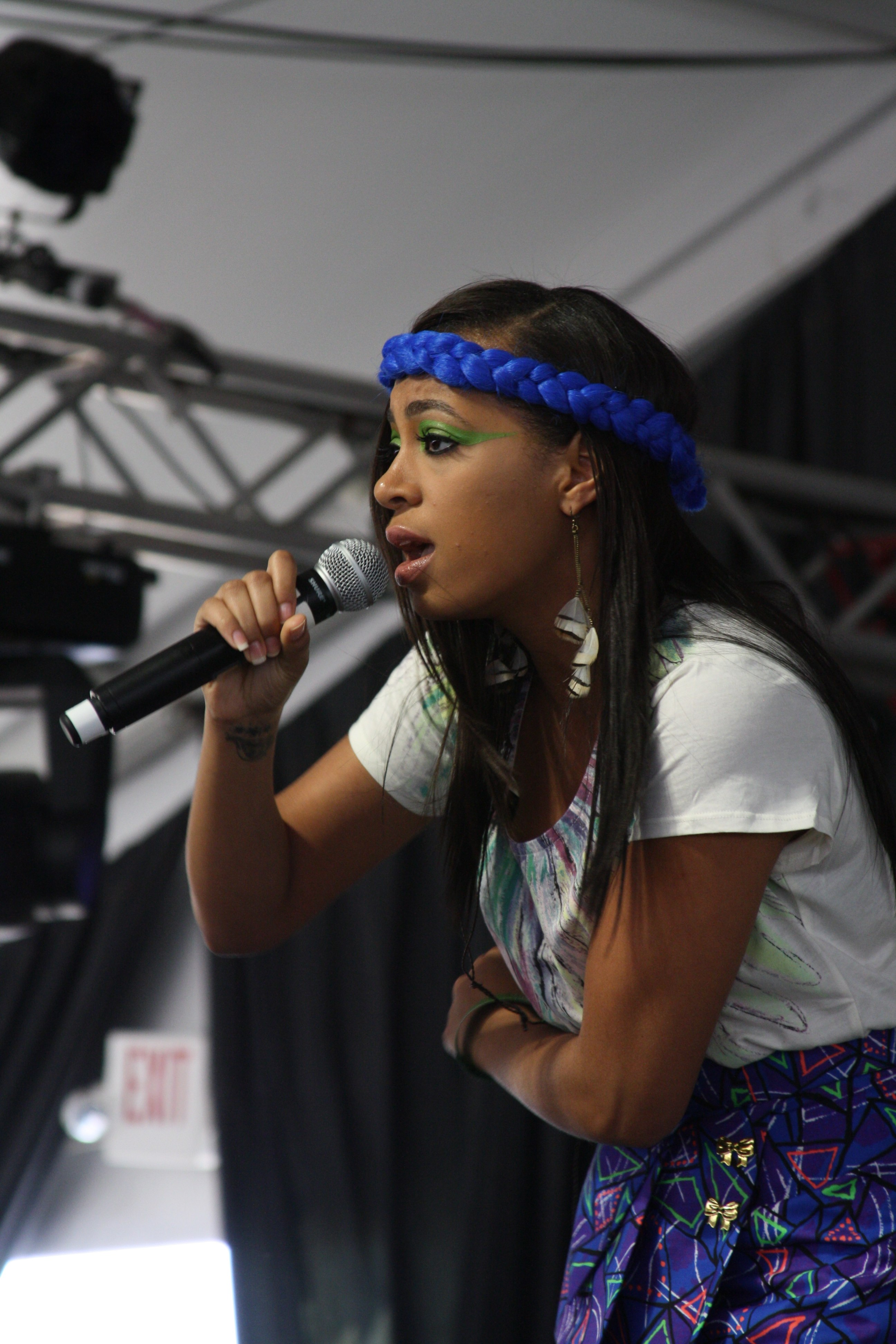
Solange performing at the South by Southwest music festival in 2009

Leading up to its release, Sol-Angel and the Hadley St. Dreams featured promotional photography of Solange in an array of costumes and wigs that evoke late 1960s and early 1970s fashion styles. The record companies of its release, Geffen and Music World Entertainment, aimed at an "intellectual, backpacking, coffee shop, digital kid" audience in promoting the album. Released on August 26, 2008, the album debuted at number three on the US Billboard Top R&B/Hip-Hop Albums chart, and at number nine on the Billboard 200, with first-week sales of 46,000 copies. By April 2009, the album had sold 138,000 copies in the United States.

The album's lead single, "I Decided", was released on April 22, 2008. It charted at number 44 on the Billboard Hot R&B/Hip-Hop Songs, at number one on the Hot Dance Singles Sales and Hot R&B/Hip-Hop Singles Sales charts, and at number two on the Hot Singles Sales chart. It also peaked at number 27 on the UK Singles Chart and at number 6 on the UK R&B Singles Chart. "ChampagneChroniKnightcap" featuring American rapper Lil Wayne was released as a single on August 19. November 25 saw the release of "Sandcastle Disco", which reached the number one spot on the US Billboard Hot Dance Club Play chart. "T.O.N.Y." was released as the fourth single on March 31, 2009, topping the US Billboard Hot Dance Club Play chart. The song also charted at number 31 on Billboard's Adult R&B Songs, and number 62 on both the R&B/Hip-Hop Airplay and Hot R&B/Hip-Hop Songs.

On August 17, 2010, "Wanna Go Back" was released as a single, and an EP of remixes for "I Told You So" was released; the latter charted at number 5 on the Billboard Hot Dance Club Play. A similar EP featuring remixes of "Would've Been the One" was released the following week on August 25, and it reached number 3 on the Billboard Hot Dance Club Play. On October 25, a remix EP was issued for "6 O'Clock Blues".

== Critical reception ==
Professional ratings
Aggregate scores
Source	Rating
Metacritic	72/100
Review scores
Source	Rating
AllMusic	4/5 stars
Digital Spy	4/5 stars
Entertainment Weekly	B+
The Guardian	3/5 stars
Hot Press	4/5
Pitchfork	7.3/10
Rolling Stone	2.5/5 stars
The Scotsman	3/5 stars
Slant Magazine	3.5/5 stars
The Times	4/5 stars

Sol-Angel and the Hadley St. Dreams was met with generally positive reviews. At Metacritic, which assigns a normalized rating out of 100 to reviews from mainstream publications, the album received an average score of 72, based on 14 reviews.

Reviewing the album in The Village Voice, Rob Harvilla called it "bizarrely mesmerizing" and said that the idiosyncratic and unconventional lyrics of some songs invite "inexplicable but highly favorable comparisons to Kate Bush. (Ethereal but powerful, unhinged but in total command.)" Ken Capobianco of The Boston Globe referred to the album as a "smartly executed, classy set of songs that's miles away from the hoochie pop being turned out by young female R&B vocalists these days". Pryia Elan of The Times declared it "a modern classic", while Hartford Courant critic Dan LeRoy compared Solange's music to that of her sister Beyoncé. "Solange combines retro warmth and current cool in ways her more commercially successful sibling probably can't", Leroy wrote. Jaimie Gill of Yahoo! Music called Sol-Angel a "fine, rich and extremely likeable record", and Francis Jones from Hot Press found Solange's singing "sassy and assured". Vibe's Keith Murphy named it one of the best R&B albums of the year. Andy Kellman of AllMusic cited it as "one of the year's more entertaining and easily enjoyable R&B releases" and found it "fun, silly, slightly eccentric and, most importantly, fearless", with most of the songs "soaked in bouncing pop-soul".

Some reviewers expressed reservations. In MSN Music, Robert Christgau gave the album an "honorable mention" and deemed Solange "privilege's child" who "runs through her options" in a defiant but frothy manner, while naming "Would've Been the One" and "I Decided" as highlights. Caroline Sullivan of The Guardian called its music "savvy R&B with a gloss you can check your reflection in", but ultimately observed "a lack of both memorable tunes and the steely spined ardour that makes Beyoncé so compelling." Sal Cinquemani from Slant Magazine was ambivalent towards its use of sampling on certain songs, but praised "the mix of organic, old-school instrumentation and more electronic elements", which he felt make it "a loose, fun and reverent record." More critical was Rolling Stone's Jody Rosen, who found it "embarrassing" for Solange to attempt Erykah Badu-inspired psychedelic-soul on tracks such as "Cosmic Journey". He also remained unimpressed by her singing and the record's sound, comparing it to "a woozy lava lamp glow."

== Track listing ==
Sol-Angel and the Hadley St. Dreams track listing
No.	Title	Writer(s)	Producer(s)	Length
1.	"God Given Name"	Solange Knowles; Robert Garza; Eric Hilton	Thievery Corporation	2:52
2.	"T.O.N.Y."	Jack Splash; Thomas Callaway	Jack Splash	3:53
3.	"Dancing in the Dark"	Knowles; Max Grasso; Christopher Thomas; Steven Sanz; Heinz Kiessling	Square & Mr. Familiar	3:57
4.	"Would've Been the One"	Knowles; Splash; Makeba Riddick	Splash	4:31
5.	"Sandcastle Disco"	Knowles; Carsten Schack; Kenneth Karlin; Callaway	Soulshock & Karlin	4:28
6.	"I Decided, Part 1"	Knowles; Pharrell Williams	The Neptunes	4:13
7.	"Valentine's Day"	Knowles; Jesse Rankins; Jonathan Wells; Eddie Smith III	The Bama Boyz	3:26
8.	"6 O'Clock Blues"	Knowles; Lamont Dozier; Mark Ronson; Bosco Mann; Neal Sugarman; Homer Steinweiss; Thomas Brenneck	Mark Ronson	3:37
9.	"Ode to Marvin"	Knowles; Splash; Riddick	Splash	3:15
10.	"I Told You So"	Knowles; Shea Taylor	Shea Taylor; Knowles	3:57
11.	"Cosmic Journey" (featuring Bilal)	Knowles; Bilal Oliver; Schack; Karlin	Soulshock & Karlin	6:12
12.	"This Bird"	Knowles; Marcus Sandison	Boards of Canada	6:08
13.	"I Decided, Part 2" (Freemasons Remix)	Knowles; Williams	Freemasons	4:01

iTunes edition bonus track
No.	Title	Writer(s)	Producer(s)	Length
14.	"White Picket Dreams"	Knowles; Taylor	Knowles; Taylor	4:22

iTunes pre-order bonus track
No.	Title	Writer(s)	Producer(s)	Length
15.	"ChampagneChroniKnightcap" (featuring Lil Wayne)	Knowles; Rankins; Smith III; Wells; Dwayne Carter	The Bama Boyz	4:52

UK/Circuit City edition bonus track
No.	Title	Writer(s)	Producer(s)	Length
14.	"ChampagneChroniKnightcap"	Knowles; Rankins; Smith III; Wells	The Bama Boyz	4:09

2010 digital deluxe edition bonus tracks
No.	Title	Writer(s)	Producer(s)	Length
14.	"6 O'Clock Blues" (Whatever Whatever Radio Remix)	Knowles; Dozier; Ronson; Mann; Sugarman; Steinweiss; Brenneck	Ronson	4:05
15.	"I Told You So" (Mike Rizzo Funk Generation Radio Mix)	Knowles; Taylor	Knowles; Taylor; Mike Rizzo^{[a]}	3:21
16.	"Wanna Go Back" (featuring Marsha Ambrosius & Q-Tip)	Knowles; Marsha Ambrosius; Kamaal Ibn John Fareed; Brian Miller; Oliver	Q-Tip	4:44

2015 deluxe edition
No.	Title	Writer(s)	Length
1.	"God Given Name"	Knowles, Garza, Hilton	2:51
2.	"White Picket Dreams"	Knowles, Taylor	4:19
3.	"T.O.N.Y."	Splash, Green	3:52
4.	"Dancing in the Dark"	Knowles, Grasso, Sanz, Thomas, Kiessling	3:57
5.	"Would've Been the One"	Knowles, Riddick, Splash	4:30
6.	"Wanna Go Back" (featuring Marsha Ambrosius & Q-Tip)	Knowles, Ambrosius, Q-Tip, Miller, Oliver	4:43
7.	"I Decided, Part 1"	Knowles, Williams, Dozier, B. Holland, E. Holland	4:13
8.	"Valentine's Day"	Knowles, Rankins, Smith III, Wells	3:26
9.	"The Thrill Is Gone" (featuring B.B. King)	Rick Darnell, Roy Hawkins	4:47
10.	"6 O'Clock Blues"	Knowles, Dozier, Ronson, Mann, Steinweiss, Sugarman, Brenneck	3:37
11.	"Ode to Marvin"	Knowles, Riddick, Splash, Gaye, Benson, Cleveland	3:15
12.	"I Told You So"	Knowles, Taylor	3:56
13.	"Cosmic Journey" (featuring Bilal)	Knowles, Oliver, Karlin, Schack	6:11
14.	"This Bird"	Knowles, Eoin, Sandison	6:07
15.	"I Decided, Part 2" (Freemasons Remix)	Knowles, Williams, Dozier, B. Holland, E. Holland	4:00
16.	"ChampagneChroniKnightcap" (featuring Lil Wayne)	Knowles, Rankins, Smith III, Wells, Carter	4:52
17.	"Fuck the Industry"	Knowles, George Clinton, Leroy Phillip Mitchell, Carlton Ridenhour, Eric Sadler, Hank Shocklee, Kanye West	3:49

Notes

- ^{^[a]} denotes co-producer

=== Sample credits ===
- "God Given Name" contains a sample of Thievery Corporation's "A Gentle Dissolve"
- "Dancing in the Dark" contains a sample of Heinz Kiessling's "Feeling Young"
- "I Decided, Part 1" contains a sample of The Supremes' "Where Did Our Love Go"
- "6 O'clock Blues" contains a sample of Sharon Jones & The Dap-Kings' "Summer of Sound"
- "Ode to Marvin" contains a sample of the percussion in Marvin Gaye's "What's Going On"
- "This Bird" contains a sample of Boards of Canada's "Slow This Bird Down"

== Personnel ==
=== Musicians ===
- Sean Hurley – guitar, keyboards, bass instrument
- John "Jabb" Broussard – guitar, bass instrument (Track 7)
- Phillip Todd – saxophone
- Noel Langley – trumpet, flugelhorn
- Neil Sidwell – trombone
- Manny Patino – drums

=== Production ===
- Arrangers: Jack Splash, Karlin, Simon Hale, Soulshock
- Engineers: Rommel Nino Villanueva, Andres Bermudez, Gelly Kusuma, Christian Plata, Ryan Gilligan, Shinnosuke Miyazawa, Robert "LB" Dorsey, Patrick Magee, Andrew Coleman
- Mixing: Ben H. Allen (Track 9), Neal H. Pogue (2, 6, 8, 13), Jack Splash (4), Manny Marroquin (3, 5), Dave Pensado (1, 7, 10, 12), Soulshock (11)
- Mastering: Tom Coyne, Chris Gehringer
- Art direction: Fusako Chubachi, Erwin Gorostiza

== Charts ==
=== Weekly charts ===
Weekly chart performance for Sol-Angel and the Hadley St. Dreams
Chart (2008)	Peak position
UK Albums (OCC)	180
UK R&B Albums (OCC)	21
US Billboard 200	9
US Top R&B/Hip-Hop Albums (Billboard)	3

=== Year-end charts ===
Year-end chart performance for Sol-Angel and the Hadley St. Dreams
Chart (2009)	Peak position
US Top R&B/Hip-Hop Albums (Billboard)	83

== See also ==
- The Way I See It
