= Solo Star =

Studio album by Solange
- Released: December 26, 2002
- Recorded: 2000–2002
- Genre: R&B
- Length: 73:27
- Label: Columbia; Music World
- Producer: Solange Knowles; Timbaland; The Neptunes; Jermaine Dupri; Troy Johnson; Linda Perry; Beyoncé Knowles; The Underdogs; Platinum Status; Rockwilder; The Bama Boyz; Da Brat

Solange chronology
Solo Star (2002)	Sol-Angel and the Hadley St. Dreams (2008)

Singles from Solo Star
- 1. "Feelin' You" Released: December 17, 2002; 2. "Crush" Released: 2003

Solo Star is the debut studio album by American singer Solange, released by Columbia Records and Music World on December 26, 2002 in Japan and January 21, 2003 in the United States. It debuted and peaked at number forty-nine on the U.S. Billboard 200 and number twenty-three on the Top R&B/Hip-Hop Albums in early February 2003. The album produced two singles: "Feelin' You" (featuring N.O.R.E.) and "Crush" (later renamed to "Don't Fight the Feeling"). "Feelin' You" reached no. 73 on the Billboard Hot R&B/Hip Hop Songs chart.

== Critical reception ==
Professional ratings
Review scores
Source	Rating
AllMusic	3/5 stars
Blender	2/5 stars
Entertainment Weekly	C+
Slant Magazine	2/5 stars

William Ruhlmann of AllMusic awarded the album three out of five stars, writing that executive producer [Mathew] Knowles surrounded Solange with trendy writer-producers including The Underdogs, Platinum Status, Timbaland, The Neptunes, and Rockwilder, as well as guest appearances from B2K and Lil' Romeo. He described the result as a contemporary R&B album filled with big beats, catchy choruses, and gimmicky production effects, but felt that Solange herself was "lost somewhere in the mix," adding that her "thin, undeveloped voice" was easily overwhelmed at times. Slant Magazine gave the album two out of five stars, criticizing its largely synthetic sound and emphasis on production over songwriting, and commenting that Solange's voice was strikingly similar to Beyoncé's.

PopMatters found that Solo Star showed Knowles as a promising and vocally mature young artist with flashes of originality, especially on stronger tracks like "Wonderland." However, it criticizes the album for clichéd lyrics, uneven production, unnecessary remixes, and failing to fully establish her identity outside of Beyoncé's shadow. Writing for Entertainment Weekly, editor Jim Farber argued that while Knowles benefited from her association with her sister, the comparison ultimately hurt her, concluding that Solo Star "fulfills a cynic's worst suspicion: It's a hollow stencil of DC's last work." Dan Leroy of The Chicago Tribune observed that most of Solo Star leans on "the usual R&B suspects," yielding mixed results. He singled out weaker cuts like "Wonderland" and remarked that "Feelin’ You Pt. 2" treads overly familiar ground. Still, he noted that tracks such as "I Used to" and "Sky Away" reveal genuine potential and gesture toward "higher aspirations," adding that if she continues to build on those strengths, Beyoncé may not remain the Knowles family's only child of destiny.

== Promotion ==
The only two singles released from the album, the N.O.R.E.-featured "Feelin' You (Part II)" and the Neptunes-produced "Crush" (also known as "Don't Fight the Feeling"), failed to chart on the Billboard Hot 100. The album is no longer in print and the online music website iTunes does not sell the album. A re-recording of "Crush", with vastly different instrumental and harmonies and featuring Papa Reu, was included on the movie soundtrack for The Fighting Temptations which stars Solange's sister Beyoncé. This re-recording was renamed "Don't Fight the Feeling" to match the movie poster's tagline. The album was promoted with the Solo Star Tour in 2003.

== Chart performance ==
Solo Star was released in December 2002 in Japan, with a United States release following the next month. It underperformed in the United States, debuting and peaking at number 49 on the Billboard 200 and dropping off the chart five weeks after its debut. The album also reached number 23 on the Top R&B/Hip-Hop Albums. By May 2008, Solo Star had sold a total of 112,000 copies, according to Nielsen SoundScan.

== Track listing ==
Standard edition
No.	Title	Writer(s)	Producer(s)	Length
1.	"Feelin' You (Part II)" (featuring N.O.R.E.)	Solange Knowles; Mark Penn; V. Santiago Jr.	S. Knowles; Penn; Damon Elliott	4:07
2.	"Ain't No Way"	Harvey Mason Jr.; Damon Thomas; Erica Dymakkus	The Underdogs	3:45
3.	"Dance with You" (featuring B2K)	S. Knowles; Marques Houston; Ketrina Askew; Jerome Jones; Kelton Kesse; Tony Oliver	Platinum Status; Chris Stokes	3:03
4.	"Get Together"	Stephen Garrett; Timothy Mosley	Timbaland	4:16
5.	"Crush"	Pharrell Williams	The Neptunes	4:34
6.	"So Be It"	S. Knowles; Troy Johnson	S. Knowles; Johnson	4:08
7.	"True Love" (duet with Lil' Romeo)	Luther Vandross; Romeo Miller; Percy Miller	Myke Diesel	3:49
8.	"Feel Good Song"	S. Knowles; Alonzo Jackson; Taura Stinton-Jackson	Jackson	3:29
9.	"Wonderland"	S. Knowles; Linda Perry; Dana Stinton	Rockwilder; Perry	4:03
10.	"This Could Be Love"	S. Knowles; Sean Paul Joseph; Johnson	S. Knowles; Johnson	4:04
11.	"Feelin' You (Part I)"	S. Knowles; Penn	S. Knowles; Penn	3:22
12.	"Just Like You"	S. Knowles; Beyoncé Knowles; Damon Elliott; Romeo Antonio	Beyoncé; Elliott	3:37
13.	"Thinkin' About You" (featuring Murphy Lee)	S. Knowles; B. Knowles; Joseph Barbera; William Hanna; Hoyt Curtin; Elliott; Tori Harper	Beyoncé; Elliott	4:04
14.	"Solo Star"	S. Knowles; B. Knowles; Kandi Burruss; Talib Kareem; Mathew Knowles	Beyoncé; Burruss; Kareem	3:14
15.	"I Used To"	S. Knowles; Jackson	Jackson	3:28
16.	"Sky Away"	S. Knowles; Michael McClain	S. Knowles; McClain	3:56

International bonus tracks
No.	Title	Length
20.	"This Song's for You"	3:20
21.	"Naïve" (duet with Beyoncé featuring Da Brat)	3:45
22.	"Feelin' You (Part II)" (Chopped & Screwed Remix)	5:22

Japanese edition
No.	Title	Length
10.	"Feelin' You (Part I)"	3:22
11.	"Just like You"	3:36
12.	"Thinkin' About You" (featuring Murphy Lee)	4:04
13.	"Solo Star"	3:14
14.	"I Used To"	3:27
15.	"Sky Away"	3:55
16.	"Naïve" (duet with Beyoncé featuring Da Brat)	3:45
17.	"Blinded"	5:08
18.	Untitled (silence)	0:04
19.	Untitled (silence)	0:04
20.	Untitled (silence)	0:04
21.	"This Song's for You"	3:20
22.	"This Could Be Love"	4:04

Notes

- Tracks 18, 19 and 20 are four seconds of silence each with bonus following.

Sample credits

- "True Love" contains replayed elements from "So Amazing" by Luther Vandross
- "Thinkin' About You" contains replayed elements from "Scooby Doo Where Are You" by Joseph Barbera, William Hanna, and Hoyt Curtin

== 2006 re-release ==
Solo Star was re-released in November 2006 with a different artwork and track listing. The reissue album contained twelve tracks: seven tracks from 2002 standard release, four remixes and previously unreleased track titled "Bring It on Home". There is a newly recorded version of "Feelin' You" which features American rapper Slim Thug. Both singles from the album were remixed. "Crush" was remixed by Vibelicious. Also, a duet with Beyoncé featuring Da Brat titled "Naïve" was remixed by Maurice Joshua.

No.	Title	Length
1.	"Ain't No Way"	3:44
2.	"Dance with You" (featuring B2K)	3:03
3.	"Get Together"	4:15
4.	"Crush"	4:33
5.	"So Be It"	4:08
6.	"Wonderland"	4:03
7.	"This Could Be Love"	4:04
8.	"Feelin' You" (featuring Slim Thug)	4:03
9.	"Bring It on Home" (written by Solange Knowles, Bama Boyz and B. Taylor)	3:47
10.	"Feelin' You" (Nu Soul Remix)	7:13
11.	"Naïve" (Maurice Joshua Remix) (duet with Beyoncé featuring Da Brat)	3:37
12.	"Crush" (Vibelicious Remix)	6:24

== Personnel ==
- Solange Knowles – composer, primary artist, producer, vocal producer
- Ketrina Askew – composer
- B2K – featured artist, guest artist, primary artist
- Rich Balmer – engineer
- Joseph Barbera – composer
- Beyoncé Knowles – producer
- Bruce Buechner – engineer
- William Burke – programming
- Skip Burrow – engineer
- Kandi Burruss – producer
- Kim Burse – A&R
- Scott Gusty Christensen – engineer
- Cedric Courtois – producer
- John Czornyj – mixing
- Myke Diesel – engineer, mixing, producer
- Jimmy Douglass – mixing
- Erica Dymakkus – backing vocals
- Damon Elliott – drum programming, engineer, keyboards, percussion, producer
- Brian Garten – engineer
- Serban Ghenea – mixing
- Dabling Harward – recording
- A. Jackson – composer
- Alonzo Jackson – producer
- Troy Johnson – composer, engineer, producer
- Jerome Jones – composer
- Talib Kareem – producer
- Mathew Knowles – executive producer
- Emily Lazar – mastering
- Murphy Lee – featured artist, primary artist
- Lil' Romeo – guest artist, primary artist
- Tony Maserati – mixing
- Master P – composer
- Michael McClain – producer
- Ramon Morales – engineer
- N.O.R.E. – composer, guest artist, primary artist
- Huy Nguyen – A&R assistance, artist coordination
- Tony Oliver – composer
- Kevin Parker – mixing
- Mark Penn – producer
- Dave Pensado – mixing
- Linda Perry – producer
- Platinum Status – producer
- Rockwilder – composer, producer
- Dexter Simmons – mixing
- Slim Thug – primary artist
- Chris Stokes – producer
- Timbaland – mixing, producer
- Luther Vandross – composer

== Charts ==
Chart performance for Solo Star
Chart (2003)	Peak position
US Billboard 200	49
US Top R&B/Hip-Hop Albums (Billboard)	23

== Release history ==
Solo Star release history
Region	Date	Edition	Format	Label
Japan	December 26, 2002	Standard	CD; digital download; cassette	Sony Music Entertainment
Australia	January 21, 2003	Standard	CD; digital download; cassette	Columbia; Music World
Europe	January 21, 2003	Standard	CD; digital download; cassette	Columbia; Music World
North America	January 21, 2003	Standard	CD; digital download; cassette	Columbia; Music World
United States	November 14, 2006	Reissue	CD	Columbia; Music World
