= T.O.N.Y. =

Single by Solange

from the album Sol-Angel and the Hadley St. Dreams
- Released: March 31, 2009
- Genre: Pop; R&B
- Length: 3:53 (album version); 3:30 (radio edit)
- Label: Music World; Geffen
- Songwriters: Jack Splash; Thomas DeCarlo Callaway
- Producer: Jack Splash

Solange singles chronology
"Sandcastle Disco" (2008)	"T.O.N.Y." (2009)	"F**k the Industry" (2010)

"T.O.N.Y." (an abbreviation of "The Other Night Y?") is a song by American singer Solange. It was written and produced by Jack Splash and Cee-Lo Green for her second studio album Sol-Angel and the Hadley St. Dreams (2008) and released on March 31, 2009, as the album's third and final single. "T.O.N.Y." refers to a one-night stand. The music video features Kid Cudi, Cee-Lo Green and Solange's son Daniel Julez Smith Jr.

== Music video ==
The music video was directed by Va$htie and Solange Knowles. It features cameo appearances by Kid Cudi who plays "T.O.N.Y. (The Other Night oh Y?)" and Cee-Lo Green. The video sees Solange running around frantically, seemingly because of T.O.N.Y; At the end of the video she holds a positive pregnancy test and a paper reading "The Other Night Y???" (T.O.N.Y). The video then switches to "T.O.N.Y" (Kid Cudi) holding the same pregnancy test and sheet of paper. The video switches back to Solange, and her holding a picture of her and a little boy, which is her son, and writing on the picture "I'm in love now".

== Track listing ==
- Australian Remixes
1. "T.O.N.Y." (DJ Escape Mix) - 7:11
2. "T.O.N.Y." (Mark Pichiotti Mix) - 7:18
3. "T.O.N.Y." (Lost Daze In My Room Mix) - 8:16
4. "T.O.N.Y." (Lost Daze Extended) - 4:33
5. "T.O.N.Y." (Zoned Out Club Mix) - 4:59
6. "T.O.N.Y." (Zoned Out Hard Electro Mix) - 7:02
7. "T.O.N.Y." (Dan McKie Mix) - 6:19

== Charts ==
=== Weekly charts ===
Chart (2009)	Peak position
US Dance Club Songs (Billboard)	1
US Hot R&B/Hip-Hop Songs (Billboard)	62

=== Year-end charts ===
Chart (2009)	Position
US Dance Club Songs (Billboard)	19

== Release history ==
Region	Date	Format	Label
United States	March 31, 2009	Digital download	Geffen
United Kingdom	May 31, 2009	Digital download	Polydor
