= Excerpts from a Love Circus =

Studio album by Lisa Germano
- Released: September 9, 1996
- Genre: Alternative rock, dream pop, folk rock
- Length: 51:52
- Label: 4AD
- Producer: Paul Mahern, Lisa Germano, Bill Bottrell

Lisa Germano chronology
Geek the Girl (1994)	Excerpts from a Love Circus (1996)	Slide (1998)

Professional ratings
Review scores
Source	Rating
AllMusic	4/5 stars
Entertainment Weekly	B+
Los Angeles Times	2.5/4 stars

Excerpts from a Love Circus is an album by the American musician Lisa Germano, released in 1996 by 4AD.

== Music ==
Three of the album's tracks contain interludes which feature home recordings of two of Germano's cats, Dorothy and Miamo-Tutti. Contrary to the track listing shown on the album's packaging, "Where's Miamo-Tutti?" actually appears during the first seventeen seconds of track 3. "Just a Bad Dream" begins at the 4:19 mark of track 6, and "There's More Kitties in the World than Just Miamo-Tutti" takes up roughly the last minute of track 11.

== Release ==
The track "Small Heads" was released as a single in the United Kingdom in August 1996, just prior to the album. Around the same time, Germano recorded an album with the members of Giant Sand under the name OP8; although originally commissioned by 4AD, the label passed on the album (Slush), which led to its release on Thirsty Ear Recordings in February 1997.

Another Germano collaboration was released later that year when the Excerpts track "Lovesick" was remixed by drum & bass producer The Underdog (aka Trevor Jackson, later of Playgroup), and released as a single on his Output Recordings label.

A later edition of Excerpts was re-released by 4AD in 1999, and contains tracks 2–4 from the "Small Heads" single added as bonus tracks, but have been removed for subsequent editions. The song "Tom, Dick and Harry" was performed by Germano on the OP8 album Slush.

== Critical reception ==
Entertainment Weekly wrote that "Germano adds trembling violins to other aural oddities, like the plinking of a toy piano and the purring of her cat ... Those quirky elements help lighten the troubled lullabies." The Tucson Weekly thought that "Germano's music is dreamy, with her haunting violin and keyboards coloring the drifty, mercurial arrangements."

"Small Heads", "I Love A Snot" and "Lovesick" all received considerable airplay on College & Alternative radio in both the US and the UK.

== Track listing ==
All songs were written by Lisa Germano

1. "Baby on the Plane"
2. "A Beautiful Schizophrenic/"Where's Miamo-Tutti?" by Dorothy"
3. "Bruises"
4. "I Love a Snot"
5. "Forget It, It's a Mystery"
6. "Victoria's Secret/"Just a Bad Dream" by Miamo-Tutti"
7. "Small Heads"
8. "We Suck"
9. "Lovesick"
10. "Singing to the Birds"
11. "Messages from Sophia/"There's More Kitties in the World than Just Miamo-Tutti" by Lisa and Dorothy"
12. "Big, Big World"
13. "Fun Fun Fun for Everyone (Acoustic)" *
14. "Tom, Dick and Harry" *
15. "Messages from Sophia (Instrumental)" *

== Personnel ==
Kenny Aronoff, Bill Bottrell, Dane Clark, Dorothy, Emily Goethals, Glenn Hicks, John Hicks, Demian Hostetter, Mark Maher, Paul Mahern, Miamo-Tutti, Allana Redecki, Craig Ross, Josh Silbert, Jake Smith, John Strohm, Thor, Wyndham Wallace. (Individual credits were not listed.)

== Credits ==
- Produced by Paul Mahern and Lisa Germano, except track 6 produced by Bill Bottrell with assistant engineer Mark Cross.
- Recorded and mixed at Echo Park Studio in Bloomington, IN, except track 6 recorded at Toad Hall Studio in Pasadena, CA.
- Mastered by Greg Calbi at Masterdisk.
- Art direction by Paul McMenamin at v23.
- Photography by Matthew Welch.
- Portrait by Michael Wilson.

== Sources ==
- Aston, Martin. Facing the Other Way: The Story of 4AD. London: The Friday Project, 2013. ISBN 978-0-00-748961-9
