= Slide (Lisa Germano album) =

Studio album by Lisa Germano
- Released: July 21, 1998
- Genres: Alternative rock, dream pop, folk rock
- Length: 43:55
- Label: 4AD
- Producer: Tchad Blake

Lisa Germano chronology
Excerpts from a Love Circus (1996)	Slide (1998)	Lullaby for Liquid Pig (2003)

Professional ratings
Review scores
Source	Rating
AllMusic	4/5 stars
The Encyclopedia of Popular Music	3/5 stars

Slide is the fifth album by Lisa Germano. It was released in 1998 by 4AD, and was her last album for the label.

== Critical reception ==
CMJ New Music Monthly called the album Germano's best to date, writing that she "is becoming more melodically grounded, and has acquired a knack for providing a visceral punch when things become too ethereal."

== Track listing ==
All songs written by Lisa Germano.

1. "Way Below the Radio"
2. "No Color Here"
3. "Tomorrowing"
4. "Electrified"
5. "Slide"
6. "If I Think of Love"
7. "Crash"
8. "Wood Floors"
9. "Turning into Betty"
10. "Guillotine"
11. "Reptile"

A version of "If I Think of Love" was previously recorded and performed by Germano on the OP8 album Slush.

"Wood Floors" was covered by William Hut on his album Road Star Doolittle. The song "Reptile" was featured in the 2003 documentary Tarnation, directed by Jonathan Caouette. Germano also performed a new version with Neil Finn's 7 Worlds Collide collaborative project on the 2009 album The Sun Came Out.

== Personnel ==
Tchad Blake, Mitchell Froom, Joe Gore, Jerry Marotta, Craig Ross, Jerry Scheff, Pete Thomas (individual credits were not listed).

== Credits ==
- Produced by Tchad Blake.
- Engineered by Tchad Blake and S. Husky Höskulds at The Sound Factory in Hollywood, and by Germano at her home.
- Mixed by Tchad Blake at The Sound Factory.
- Mastered by Bob Ludwig at Gateway.
- Art direction by Paul McMenamin.
- Photography by Matthew Welch.
- Illustration by Paige Imatani.
