= Johnny Marr guest musician recordings =

Musician Johnny Marr, formerly with the Smiths, the Pretenders, the The, Electronic, Modest Mouse, and the Cribs, and now playing solo, has appeared as a guest musician on the recordings of numerous other musicians. Songs he appears on are stated for each album listed below.

== Billy Bragg ==
- Don't Try This at Home (1991) "Cindy of a Thousand Lives" "Sexuality" (also co-wrote)
- Bloke on Bloke (1997) "The Boy Done Good" (also co-wrote)
- Reaching to the Converted (1999) "Shirley" "The Boy Done Good" (also co-wrote) "Walk Away Renée"
- Brewing Up with Billy Bragg (2006) "The Last Time" "Back to the Old House" (also co-wrote) "A Lover Sings" (Alternative Version)

== Bryan Ferry ==
- Bête Noire (1987) "Limbo" Kiss and Tell" "The Right Stuff" (also co-wrote) "Seven Deadly Sins"
- Avonmore (2014) "Loop De Li" "Midnight Train" "Soldier of Fortune" (also co-wrote) "Driving Me Wild" "Avonmore" "One Night Stand" "Send in the Clowns"

== Talking Heads ==
- Naked (1988) "Ruby Dear" "(Nothing But) Flowers" "Mommy Daddy You and I" "Cool Water"

== Sandie Shaw ==
- Hello Angel (1988) "Hand In Glove" (also co-wrote)

== Kirsty MacColl ==
- Kite (1989) "Mother's Ruin" "Days" No Victims" "Tread Lightly" "What Do Pretty Girls Do?" "The End of a Perfect Day" (also co-wrote) "You and me Baby" (also co-wrote) "You Just Haven't Earned It Yet, Baby" (also co-wrote) "Complainte Pour Ste Catherine"
- Electric Landlady (1991) "Walking Down Madison" (also co-wrote) "Children of the Revolution" (also co-wrote)
- Titanic Days (1993) "Can't Stop Killing You" (as co-writer only)

== The Pretenders ==
- Packed! (1990) "When Will I See You" (as co-writer only)

== Pet Shop Boys ==
- Behaviour (1990) ""This Must Be the Place I Waited Years to Leave" "My October Symphony"
- Bilingual (1996) "Up Against It"
- Release (2002) "Home and Dry" "I Get Along" "Birthday Boy" "E-Mail" "Love Is a Catastrophe" "The Night I Fell in Love" "You Choose"
- Yes (2009) "Beautiful People" "Did You See Me Coming?" "Building a Wall" "Pandemonium"

== Banderas ==
- Ripe (1991) "This Is Your Life"

== Stex ==
- Spiritual Dance (1992) "If I Were You" "Still Feel the Rain"

== K-Klass ==
- Universal (1993) "La Cassa"

== Electrafixion ==
- Burned (1995) "Lowdown" (as co-writer only) "Too Far Gone" (as co-writer only)

== M People ==
- Fresco (1997) "Rhythm and Blues" "Believe It"

== Marion ==
- The Program (1998) "The Smile" "Miyako Hideaway" (also co-wrote) "Sparkle" "Is That So?" "What Are We Waiting For?" "Strangers" "The Powder Room Plan" "The Program" "All of These Days" "Comeback"

== Beck ==
- Midnite Vultures (1999) "Milk & Honey"

== Tom Jones ==
- Reload (1999) "Lust for Life" (w/The Pretenders)

== The Cult ==
- Rare Cult (2000) "North"

== Bert Jansch ==
- Crimson Moon (2000) "Looking for Love" "Fool's Mate" "The River Bank" "My Donald"
- On The Edge Of A Dream (2017) "It Don't Bother Me" "Cocaine"
- At The BBC (2022) "The River Bank" "Train Song" "I've Got a Feeling" "It Don't Bother Me" "Fool's Mate" "Presentation Speech" "Poison"

== Twenty Four Hours ==
- This Is Urbanite.Co.Uk (2001) "Imagine a Feeling"

== Moodswings ==
- Horizontal (2002) "Blue Topaz" "Seems To Remind Me (Of Love)" "Into The Blue" (Vocal Remix)

== Oasis ==
- Heathen Chemistry (2002) "(Probably) All in the Mind" "Born on a Different Cloud" "Better Man"

== Beth Orton ==
- Daybreaker (2002) "Concrete Sky" (as co-writer only)

== The Charlatans ==
- Live It Like You Love It (2002) "Weirdo" (live)
- Different Days (2017) "Future Tense" "Plastic Machinery" "Not Forgotten"

== Pearl Jam ==
- Feb 23 03#10 Perth (2003) "Fortunate Son" (live)

== Quando Quango ==
- Pigs + Battleships (2003) "Atom Rock" "Triangle"

== Lisa Germano ==
- Lullaby for Liquid Pig (2003) "Paper Doll" "Into the Night"
- In the Maybe World (2006) "Into Oblivion" "Wire"

== Tweaker ==
- 2 a.m. Wakeup Call (2004) "The House I Grew Up In" (also co-wrote)

== Haven ==
- All for a Reason (2004) "Change Direction" "Have No Fear" (also co-wrote) "The First Time" (also co-wrote) "Wouldn't Change a Thing" "Something Moved Me" "Together's Better"

== Jane Birkin ==
- Fictions (2006) "Home" "Living In Limbo" "Waterloo Station" "My Secret" "Mother Stands for Comfort"

== Transit Kings ==
- Living in a Giant Candle Winking at God (2006) "America Is Unavailable"

== Crowded House ==
- Time On Earth (2007) "Don't Stop Now" "Even a Child" (also co-wrote)

== Girls Aloud ==
- Out of Control (2008) "Rolling Back the Rivers of Time" "Love is the Key"

== John Frusciante ==
- The Empyrean (2009) "Enough of Me" "Central"

== Robyn Hitchcock ==
- Propellor Time (2010) "Ordinary Millionaire" (also co-wrote)
- Shufflemania! (2022) "The Inner Life of Scorpio"

== Edwyn Collins ==
- Losing Sleep (2010) "Come Tomorrow, Come Today" (also co-wrote)

== Hans Zimmer ==
- Inception: Music from the Motion Picture (2010) "Half Remembered Dream" "We Built Our Own World" "Dream Is Collapsing" "Radical Notion" "Old Souls" "528491" "Mombasa" "One Simple Idea" "Dream Within a Dream" "Waiting for a Train" "Paradox" "Time" "Projections" "Don't Think About Elephants"
- The Amazing Spider-Man 2: The Original Motion Picture Soundtrack (2014) "I'm Electro" "There He Is" "I'm Spider-Man" "My Enemy" "Ground Rules" "Look at Me" "Special Project" "You Need Me" "So Much Anger" "I'm Moving to England" "I'm Goblin" "Let Her Go" "You're My Boy" "I Need to Know" "Sum Total" "I Chose You" "We're Best Friends" "Still Crazy" "The Rest of My Life" "You're That Spider Guy" "The Electro Suite" "Harry's Suite" "Cold War" "No Place Like Home" "Here" (also co-wrote) "Within the Web (First Day Jam)" (also co-wrote)
- Freeheld Soundtrack (2015) "On The Case" "Can I Have Your Number?" "House Hunting" "Can't Leave Her" "The Decision" "Justice" "Remembering"
- Live In Prague (2017) "What Are You Going to Do When Your Not Saving The World?" "Journey to the Line" "The Electro Suite" "The Dark Night Trilogy Medley" "Aurora" "Interstellar Medley" "Inception Medley"
- No Time to Die (2021) "Gun Barrel" "Matera" "Message from an Old Friend" "Square Escape" "Someone Was Here" "Not What I Expected" "What Have You Done?" "Shouldn't We Get to Know Each Other First?" "Cuba Chase" "Back to MI6" "Good to Have You Back" "Lovely to See You Again" "Home" "Norway Chase" "Gearing Up" "Poison Garden" "The Factory" "I'll Be Right Back" "Opening the Doors" "Final Ascent" "No Time to Die"

== Pajama Club ==
- Pajama Club (2011) "Can't Put It Down Until It Ends" "Go Kart"

== Malka Spigel ==
- Every Day Is Like the First Day (2012) "Every Day is Like The First Day" "Lost In Sound" "Finding You"

== Andrew Loog Oldham ==
- Andrew Oldham Orchestra and Friends play the Rolling Stones Songbook Vol. 2 (2013) "As Tears Go By"

== Tim Wheeler ==
- Lost Domain (2014) "Ariadna"

== Noel Gallagher's High Flying Birds ==
- Chasing Yesterday (2015) "Ballad of the Mighty I"
- Who Built the Moon? (2017) "If Love is the Law"
- Council Skies (2023) "Pretty Boy" "Council Skies" "Open the Door, See What You Find"

== Chris Spedding ==
- Joyland (2015) "Heisenberg"

== Blondie ==
- Pollinator (2017) "My Monster" (also wrote)

== A Certain Ratio ==
- ACR:Box (2019) "Shack Up" (w/Electronic)

== Drake ==
- Care Package (2019) "Can I" (as co-writer only)

== The Avalanches ==
- We Will Always Love You (2020) "The Divine Chord"

== Jake Bugg ==
- Jake Bugg (2022) "Kingpin" (live) "Slumville Sunrise" (live) "Lightning Bolt" (live)

== The Dream Academy ==
- Religion, Revolution and Railways: The Complete Recordings (2024) "Ballad In 4/4"

== Peter Perrett ==
- The Cleansing (2024) "Solitary Confinement" "World In Chains"
