= Takes (album) =

Studio album by Adem
- Released: 12 May 2008 (UK); 17 June 2008 (US)
- Genres: Folk, indie pop
- Length: 50:48
- Label: Domino

Adem chronology
Love and Other Planets (2006)	Takes (2008)

Professional ratings
Review scores
Source	Rating
The Independent	3/5 stars
Pitchfork Media	7.3/10

Takes is the third studio album by British singer/songwriter Adem. It is a covers album, consisting primarily of covers of 1990s pop/alternative tracks.

== Track listing ==
No.	Title	Original artist	Length
1.	"Bedside Table"	Bedhead	5:24
2.	"Oh My Lover"	PJ Harvey	3:08
3.	"Slide"	Lisa Germano	3:37
4.	"Loro"	Pinback	4:39
5.	"Hotellounge"	dEUS	5:11
6.	"To Cure a Weakling Child + Boy/Girl Song"	Aphex Twin	6:29
7.	"Tears Are in Your Eyes"	Yo La Tengo	3:56
8.	"Starla"	Smashing Pumpkins	3:54
9.	"Gamera"	Tortoise	4:29
10.	"Unravel"	Björk	3:18
11.	"Invisible Man"	The Breeders	3:42
12.	"Laser Beam"	Low	3:01
