= Strange Dance =

Studio album by Philip Selway
- Released: 24 February 2023
- Studio: Evolution Recording Studios (Oxford)
- Genre: Alternative rock
- Length: 46:55
- Label: Bella Union
- Producer: Marta Salogni

Philip Selway chronology
Let Me Go OST (2017)	Strange Dance (2023)

Singles from Strange Dance
- 1. "Check for Signs of Life" Released: 25 October 2022; 2. "Picking Up Pieces" Released: 9 January 2023; 3. "Strange Dance" Released: 8 February 2023

Strange Dance is the third studio album by the English musician Philip Selway. It was released on 24 February 2023 via Bella Union. It comes almost nine years after Selway's previous studio album, Weatherhouse, not including Selway's composition of the soundtrack to the film Let Me Go in 2017. The album received generally positive reviews.

== Content ==
Selway described his vision for the project as "a Carole King record if she collaborated with the pioneering electronic composer Daphne Oram and invited her to drum on it". Contributors include Marta Salogni, who also produced the album, and Hannah Peel, Adrian Utley of Portishead and Quinta. Selway chose not to drum on the album, finding he was out of practice and "not in the right mindset", and enlisted the Italian drummer Valentina Magaletti.

The album cover features a piece by the abstract painter Stewart Geddes.

== Release ==
"Check for Signs of Life" was released as the first single on 25 October 2022, followed by "Picking Up Pieces" on 9 January 2023, and “Strange Dance” on 8 February 2023. Strange Dance was released on 24 February 2023 via Bella Union.

Alongside the standard release, the album received a deluxe edition for vinyl containing a second LP called Liminal, consisting of pieces Selway composed for the film Carmilla and the BBC Radio 3 play Sea Longing, alongside additional prints by Geddes.

Professional ratings
Aggregate scores
Source	Rating
Metacritic	68/100
Review scores
Source	Rating
Clash	8/10
DIY	3.5/5 stars
musicOMH	3.5/5 stars
Pitchfork	5.8/10
PopMatters	6/10
Uncut	7/10
AllMusic	3.5/5 stars

== Track listing ==
All tracks are written by Philip Selway.

Strange Dance track listing
No.	Title	Length
1.	"Little Things"	3:34
2.	"What Keeps You Awake at Night"	6:56
3.	"Check for Signs of Life"	4:21
4.	"Picking Up Pieces"	4:28
5.	"The Other Side"	4:11
6.	"Strange Dance"	5:57
7.	"Make It Go Away"	3:59
8.	"The Heart of It All"	4:14
9.	"Salt Air"	4:45
10.	"There'll Be Better Days"	4:30
Total length:		46:55

== Charts ==
Chart performance for Strange Dance
Chart (2023)	Peak position
Scottish Albums (OCC)	96
UK Album Downloads (OCC)	66
UK Independent Albums (OCC)	8
