= Geek the Girl =

Studio album by Lisa Germano
- Released: October 25, 1994
- Recorded: Echo Park Studio, Bloomington, Indiana
- Genres: Slowcore; folk rock; dream pop
- Length: 43:38
- Label: 4AD
- Producers: Lisa Germano, Malcolm Burn

Lisa Germano chronology
Happiness (1993/1994)	Geek the Girl (1994)	Excerpts from a Love Circus (1996)

Geek the Girl is the third studio album by American singer-songwriter Lisa Germano. A breakthrough of sorts for her, it was released on October 25, 1994, by 4AD, just six months after the re-release of her previous album, Happiness.

The album was featured as the 84th best album of the 1990s by the music magazine Spin.

== Recording ==
Most tracks on Geek the Girl were recorded at Lisa Germano's home, giving the album an intimate and demo-like feel. Initially, she played all of the instruments on the record, but she then chose to re-mix four of the tracks with the help of Malcolm Burn, and added Kenny Aronoff on drums.

All of the songs on the album are written by Germano, except for 'Just Geek' and 'Sexy Little Girl Princess', which were co-authored by Malcolm Burn, and 'Cry Wolf', which she wrote with Jay Joyce. The album was produced by Germano and Malcolm Burn. It was mixed by Burn at Echo Park Studio in Bloomington, IN, and Kenny Aronoff's drum performances were also recorded there. The album was mastered at Masterdisk. Assistant engineers were Mark Hood, Pat Keating and Ron Black.

== Content ==
Lisa Germano has said that "Geek the Girl is about this person who's not growing and is real stuck. Most of my records are about people who are stuck but they want to go somewhere else."

Throughout the album, Germano uses a Sicilian folk tune called 'Frascilita' as an interlude between songs, as well as for the introduction to the album, on the first track 'My Secret Reason'. She introduced this piece to add some levity to the album, as she thought it "really needed some comic relief." The album deals with some dark subjects, including stalking (in the much-discussed track 'A Psychopath'), media censorship and inherent evil ('My Secret Reason'), and rape ('Cry Wolf').

The song 'A Psychopath', which samples a real 911 call where a woman confronts an intruder in her home, was written about her own experience with a stalker and the feeling of fear and helplessness that came from it. She obtained the 911 call recording from a rape centre (with their permission), after encountering it in a documentary about violence. She was hesitant to use the recording, thinking it was "too intense", however ultimately decided it was something worth saying. Germano has said that making the song was scary and very upsetting, and that she had trouble sleeping after recording it.

== Promotion ==
A music video for "Cry Wolf" was produced. The song was featured in the movie Rain and its soundtrack, years later. A promotional-only CD single for "Cry Wolf" was also released, featuring an edited version of the title track, remixed versions of "Cancer of Everything" and "Sexy Little Girl Princess", and the non-album track "The Mirror Is Gone".

== Reception ==
Professional ratings
Review scores
Source	Rating
AllMusic	4.5/5 stars
Encyclopedia of Popular Music	4/5 stars
Entertainment Weekly	A+
The Guardian	3/4 stars
Q	4/5 stars
Rolling Stone	4/5 stars
Select	4/5

Josef Woodard of Entertainment Weekly gave the album an A+ grade, calling it "one of the more haunting and enlightened projects of the year" and "Raw in sound and subject".

In her retrospective review, Heather Phares of AllMusic wrote that "[with] Geek the Girl, Lisa Germano found the perfect balance of her work's inherent contrasts. [...] Geek the Girl's brave whispers hit on more emotional truths than the self-important screams of Germano's mid-'90s, women-in-rock contemporaries."

== Legacy ==
The album was voted the 84th best of the 1990s by music magazine Spin. The album's title track was voted at number 91 in the same publication's list of the 100 best alternative rock songs.

== Track listing ==
All tracks are written by Lisa Germano, except where noted.

No.	Title	Writer(s)	Length
1.	"My Secret Reason"		4:33
2.	"Trouble"		2:20
3.	"Geek the Girl"		3:40
4.	"Just Geek"	Germano, Malcolm Burn	2:44
5.	"Cry Wolf"	Germano, Burn, Jay Joyce	4:59
6.	"...A Psychopath"		4:37
7.	"Sexy Little Girl Princess"	Germano, Burn	3:39
8.	"Phantom Love"		3:22
9.	"Cancer of Everything"		4:00
10.	"A Guy Like You"		3:18
11.	"...Of Love and Colors"		3:55
12.	"Stars"		2:32

== Personnel ==
- Lisa Germano – performer, production
- Kenny Aronoff – drums on tracks 3, 9 and 12
- Malcolm Burn – drums on tracks 4 and 7, dulcimer on track 7, guitar on tracks 4 and 9, piano on track 7, production, mixing on tracks 3, 5, 9 and 12

Technical

- Mark Hood – engineering assistance
- Pat Keating – engineering assistance
- Ron Black – engineering assistance
- Greg Calbi – mastering at Masterdisk
- Paul McMenamin at v23 – sleeve art direction
- Dominic Davies – sleeve photography
