= Adem Ilhan =

English musician

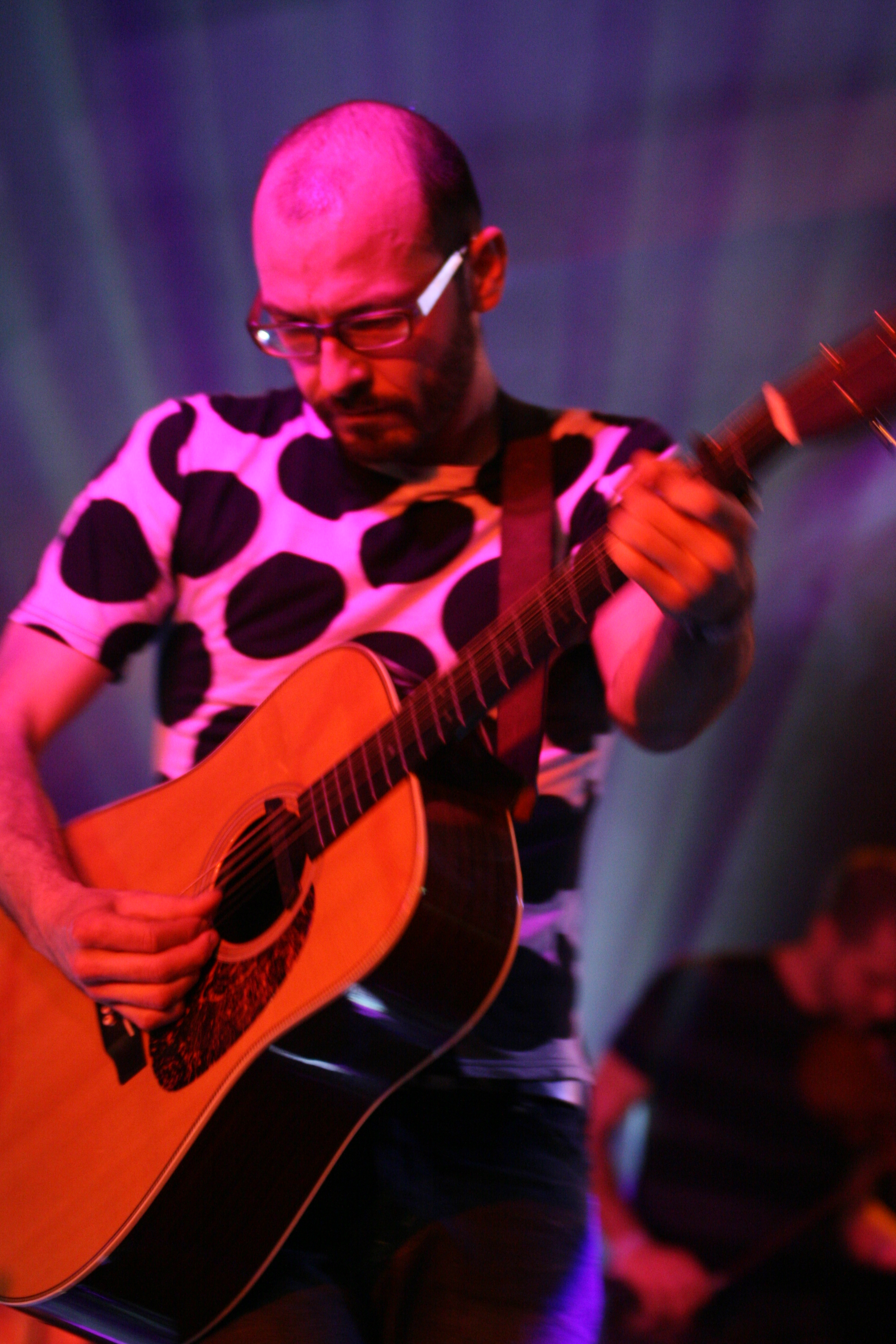

Background information
- Also known as: Adem
- Born: Adem Ilhan; 20 November 1977 (age 48)
- Origin: South London, England
- Genres: Folktronica, indie folk, post-rock
- Instruments: Vocals, guitar, bass guitar
- Years active: 1995–present
- Label: Domino Recording Company
- Website: www.adem.tv

Adem Ilhan (born 20 November 1977) is an English composer, producer and singer-songwriter. He has released many albums: his solo music project released under the name Adem, in the post-rock band Fridge, alongside Kieran Hebden, and as part of the electronic duo Silver Columns with Johnny Lynch. He has scored several feature films and television series and numerous documentaries.

== Recording history ==
Ilhan's debut solo album, Homesongs, appeared on Domino Records in 2004. Mixed by Kieran Hebden, the album found critical acclaim with limited commercial success. The album includes the song "Statued", which featured on the soundtrack of the film Dead Man's Shoes.

A second album, Love and Other Planets, was released on 24 April 2006 to generally favourable reviews.

In May 2008 Ilhan released a collection of cover songs called Takes. The album includes tracks originally written and performed by Yo La Tengo, The Smashing Pumpkins, Björk, dEUS, and Bedhead, among others.

In 2008 Ilhan along with Jeremy Warmsley & Mystery Jets contributed the song "Grains of Sand" to the Survival International charity album Songs for Survival.

In 2011, Adem collaborated with folk music group Lau to create the Ghosts EP under the name Lau vs Adem.

Since 2014, Ilhan has been performing with Philip Selway's band and opened for Selway on his 2015 US tour.

After years of collaborations by production and session-playing, Adem released a new solo album, seconds are acorns, in October 2015. The first single from it, "Snow in April", received its first radio airplay on BBC 6 Music in August.

Ilhan has also been involved in film and television soundtracks. He was musical director and co-wrote the original tracks for the 2019 film Yesterday, and soundtracked several productions, including In the Loop (2009) and Avenue 5 (2020) (both by Armando Iannucci), and David Farr's film The Ones Below (2015). He produced the original songs and the official soundtrack album of The Ballad of Wallis Island (2025).

== Discography ==
=== Solo albums ===
- Homesongs (29 March 2004)
- Love and Other Planets (24 April 2006)
- Takes (12 May 2008)
- seconds are acorns (16 October 2015)

=== Singles ===
- "These Are Your Friends" (17 May 2004) (CD/10")
- "Ringing in My Ear" (13 September 2004) (CD/7")
- "Waves" (19 June 2006) (only as a download on iTunes 'Free Single of The Week')
- "Launch Yourself" (2007) (CD/7") UK No. 157

== Other work ==
- Ilhan contributed a cover of Jeff Buckley's "Mojo Pin" for the 2005 tribute album Dream Brother: The Songs of Tim and Jeff Buckley.
- Ilhan plays the bass and sings on English folk supergroup The Memory Band's 2006 album Apron Strings.
- Ilhan is the founder and organiser of the Homefires Festival, which takes place at the Conway Hall in London, UK.
- Ilhan remixed the track "Welcome, Ghosts" for a special edition release of Explosions in the Sky's 2007 album All of a Sudden I Miss Everyone.
- Ilhan plays on Vashti Bunyan's 2005 album Lookaftering
- Ilhan sang a cover of Johnny Cash's "I Walk the Line" for a 2006 Levi's "Slim Straight" Jeans commercial.
- Vocals by Ilhan are featured on two tracks from the Emma Pollock album, The Law of Large Numbers; Letters To Strangers and Chemistry Will Find Me.
- Ilhan mastered the single version of "You Only Went Out to Get Drunk Last Night" by Kid Canaveral, released in May 2010.
- Ilhan collaborated with Lau on the EP Ghosts (credited to Lau vs Adem, 2011).
- Ilhan participated in the recording of Philip Selway's 2014 solo album Weatherhouse.

== Personal life ==
Ilhan grew up in London; his father had emigrated from Turkey. He attended the Elliott School in Putney, which had gained a reputation of nurturing talented musicians, with Ilhan being the contemporary of artists including Kieran Hebden, members of Hot Chip and members of the Elysian Quartet, all of whom he has later collaborated with. He also attended the University of Warwick for a degree in mathematics. In December 2006 Ilhan played a free concert in Barrhead Community Library, commenting: "I love libraries. [...] The existence of public libraries is one of my favourite achievements of human kind".

Ilhan is deaf in one ear. After many years in London, he and his family now live in Margate.
