= Happiness (Lisa Germano album) =

Studio album by Lisa Germano
- Released: July 27, 1993
- Genre: Alternative rock, dream pop, folk rock
- Length: 49:26
- Label: Capitol
- Producer: Malcolm Burn

Lisa Germano chronology
On the Way Down From the Moon Palace (1991)	Happiness (1993)	Geek the Girl (1994)

Happiness is the second album by Lisa Germano. Released by Capitol Records in 1993, it was re-released by 4AD Records the following year. A music video was produced for the single "You Make Me Want to Wear Dresses."

== Track listing ==
All tracks written by Lisa Germano, except 5 written by Germano/Joyce, and 10 written by Lee Hazlewood. The title of track 2 was changed to "The Dresses Song" on all subsequent re-releases of this album, while 10 and 11 have been omitted completely. Track 11 was made available on Germano's self-released compilation, Rare, Unusual or Just Bad Songs (2002), but track 10 remains unreleased elsewhere.

1. "Around the World"
2. "You Make Me Want to Wear Dresses"
3. "Happiness"
4. "Bad Attitude"
5. "Sycophant"
6. "Miamo-Tutti"
7. "Energy"
8. "Cowboy"
9. "Puppet"
10. "These Boots Are Made for Walkin'"
11. "Breathe Acrost Texas"
12. "Everyone's Victim"
13. "The Darkest Night of All"

== Personnel ==
- Kenny Aronoff – drums (tracks 7, 9)
- Malcolm Burn – guitar (3, 7, 10), keyboards (4, 5, 9), bass guitar (10)
- Bill Dillon – guitar (1, 3, 4, 9), bass guitar (12)
- Daryl Johnson – bass guitar (1, 3, 4), djembe (1), drums (12)
- Ronald Jones – drums (1, 3, 4, 12)
- Jay Joyce – guitar (2, 9, 12), keyboards (1), bass guitar (3, 5)
- John Keane – pedal steel (8), guitar (9)
- Giles Reaves – drums (2)
- Toby Myers – bass guitar (7, 9)
- Produced by Malcolm Burn.
- Recorded at Kingsway Studio in New Orleans; additional recording done at Champagne Studio in Nashville, September Studio in Indianapolis, and Germano's home.
- Engineered by Malcolm Burn, Mark Howard, Wayne Lorenz, John Keane, and Trina Shoemaker. Additional engineering by Giles Reaves, Mike Griffith, Paul Mahern, and Mark Hood.
- Mixed by Malcolm Burn and Wayne Lorenz at Kingsway, except 7 mixed by Paul Mahern at Pinebrook Studio in Alexandria, IN.
- Mastered by Greg Calbi at Sterling Sound in New York City.
- Cover photograph by Bob Lanois, coloring by Jim Merrill.
- Rear cover drawing by Haley Goethals.
- Design by Jeff Fey.

== Inconsiderate Bitch ==
Inconsiderate Bitch

EP by Lisa Germano
- Released: January 17, 1994
- Recorded: 1993
- Genre: Alternative rock, dream pop, folk rock
- Length: 25:56
- Label: 4AD
- Producer: Malcolm Burn

The Inconsiderate Bitch EP is the third solo release by Lisa Germano, and her first for the 4AD label. It was one of a series of limited-edition "temporary releases" by 4AD, meant to supplement concurrent releases by the same act; in this case, Inconsiderate Bitch acted as a "teaser" for the label's re-release of Happiness, while also serving as an introduction of Germano to her new label's audience. While preparing and resequencing the album for its re-release, 4AD founder and then-president Ivo Watts-Russell and engineer John Fryer (who had worked on Watts-Russell's This Mortal Coil project) also created this suite of alternate remixes, with the exception of "(Late Night) Dresses", a version of "You Make Me Wanto Wear Dresses" (later retitled "The Dresses Song") remixed by the original producer, Malcolm Burn.

== Track listing ==
1. "Happiness"
2. "Energy"
3. "Puppet"
4. "Sycophant"
5. (Late Night) Dresses

All songs were written by Lisa Germano, except track 4 written by Germano/Joyce. Tracks 2–5 were later added to an edition of Happiness re-released by 4AD in 1999, but have since been removed for subsequent editions. Track 1 remains available only on this CD; with a running time of 8:17, it is considerably extended compared to the two album versions.

== Personnel ==
Same as above, except:

- Mixed and compiled by Ivo Watts-Russell and John Fryer, except track 5 mixed by Malcolm Burn.
- Mixed at Blackwing Studios in London.
- Cover image by Cathy Fenwick.
- Photography by Andrew Catlin.
- Design by Vaughan Oliver and Chris Bigg at v23.

Happiness

Studio album by Lisa Germano
- Released: April 26, 1994
- Genre: Alternative rock, dream pop, folk rock
- Length: 53:44
- Label: 4AD
- Producer: Malcolm Burn

Professional ratings
Review scores
Source	Rating
AllMusic	4.5/5 stars
Robert Christgau	(dud)
The Encyclopedia of Popular Music	4/5 stars
Entertainment Weekly	B

Three months after releasing the Inconsiderate Bitch EP, Germano's new label, 4AD, reissued her second album, Happiness, with a resequenced track listing, two new songs replacing two from the original, and radically different artwork.

== Track listing ==
=== 1994 4AD reissue ===
1. "Bad Attitude"
2. "Destroy the Flower"
3. "Puppet"
4. "Everyone's Victim"
5. "Energy"
6. "Cowboy"
7. "Happiness"
8. "The Earth"
9. "Around the World"
10. "Sycophant"
11. "Miamo-Tutti"
12. "The Dresses Song"
13. "The Darkest Night of All"

All songs were written by Lisa Germano, except track 10 written by Germano/Joyce. Tracks 2 and 8 did not appear on the original Capitol version of the album; track 12 was previously titled "You Make Me Wanto Wear Dresses". A later edition of Happiness, re-released by 4AD in 1999, contained tracks 2–5 from the Inconsiderate Bitch EP added to the end as bonus tracks, but have since been removed for subsequent editions.

A music video for the song "Puppet" was produced and can be viewed on the MUZU TV website.

== Personnel ==
Same as above, except:

- Jay Joyce – bass (2)
- Michael Radovsky – drums (2)
- Track 2 was produced by Jay Joyce.
- Track 10 was produced by Malcolm Burn and Jay Joyce.
- Track 2 was engineered by Mike Griffith at Champagne Studios in Nashville, and mixed by Jay Joyce and Mike Griffith.
- Track 8 was engineered by Giles Reaves at Bloodsucker Studios.
- Track 3 was remixed by Malcolm Burn and Trina Shoemaker.
- Design by Vaughan Oliver and Adrian Philpott; images by John Weber.
