= Quinta (musician) =

- Born: Katherine Mann
- Origin: London, England
- Occupation: Instrumentalist
- Instruments: Violin; viola; musical saw; keyboards

Quinta is the stage name of Katherine Mann, a London-based multi-instrumentalist, solo artist, composer, and session player. She plays the violin, viola, musical saw, and keyboards. Mann's father nicknamed her "Quinta" when she was a baby; he was a teacher of Latin and Greek, and she was the fifth of five children.

Mann is a member of experimental arts quartet Collectress who released their first album Mondegreen in 2014. She has released two solo albums, My Sister Boudicca (2009) and The Quick of the Heart (2017).

Mann has performed with numerous other artists including as one of Bat for Lashes’ Blue Dreams on her Radiohead support tour and as solo accompanist to Patrick Wolf on his Sundark Riverlight Acoustic World Tour.

Since 2010, she has worked extensively with Radiohead's Philip Selway, including on his 2014 album release Weatherhouse and on the acclaimed score for Rambert's Merce Cunningham Event in 2014.

Mann has composed for circus, dance, theatre and television, including for The Paper Cinema, Mimbre, Ockham's Razor and Rambert amongst others.

Mann was Rambert's 2015/16 Music Fellow, British Council/PRSF China Musician-in-Residence in 2017, and PRSF Composer Fund awardee in 2019.

== Selected discography ==
- Bat for Lashes – Two Suns (2009)
- Quinta – My Sister Boudicca (2009)
- Philip Selway – Running Blind EP (2011)
- Philip Selway – Weatherhouse (2014)
- Collectress – Mondegreen (2014)
- Quinta – Flux: new music new dance (2017)
- Quinta – The Quick of the Heart (2017)
- Lamb – The Secret Of Letting Go (2019)
