= Glenn Kotche =

American drummer and composer (born 1970)

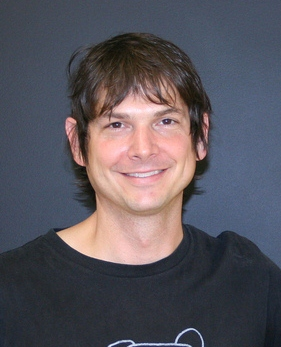
- Glenn Kotche in 2011

Background information
- Born: December 31, 1970 (age 55); Roselle, Illinois, U.S.
- Genres: Alternative rock, indie rock, alternative country
- Occupation: Musician
- Instruments: Drums, percussion, hammered dulcimer
- Years active: 1994–present
- Website: www.glennkotche.com

Signature
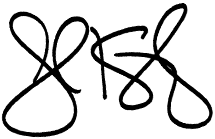

Glenn Kotche /ˈkoʊtʃi/ (born December 31, 1970 in Roselle, Illinois, United States) is an American drummer and composer, best known for his involvement in the band Wilco. He was named the 40th greatest drummer of all time by Gigwise in 2008.

Prior to working with Wilco, Kotche released a four-track album entitled Introducing. In 2003, he released a second solo album titled Next, featuring solo drum improvisations using homemade percussion installations. A third solo album was released in March 2006 on Nonesuch Records, entitled Mobile. This album featured a broad range of compositions for percussion.

== With Wilco ==
Kotche wound up joining Wilco because of Jim O'Rourke, who originally caught him playing a show with Edith Frost. He went on to make several records with O'Rourke including two Loose Fur albums (O’Rourke, Kotche and Jeff Tweedy). Throughout Kotche's career with Wilco (Yankee Hotel Foxtrot, the Grammy award-winning A Ghost is Born, The Wilco Book companion CD, Kicking Television: Live in Chicago, Sky Blue Sky, Wilco (The Album), The Whole Love, Star Wars, Schmilco, Ode to Joy, Cruel Country) and his solo projects, he has treated the drumset as a multiple percussion instrument including home-made instruments, pitched percussion, various found objects such as scrap metal and hubcaps and orchestral instruments.

== Other work ==
Kotche has also collaborated on several other side projects with members of Wilco and others, including an ongoing band with Darin Gray called On Fillmore, cellist Fred Lonberg-Holm, members of the band Nickel Creek, percussionists David Cossin, Tim Barnes and Chris Corsano, and many others. He has appeared on over 70 recordings to date.

Kotche collaborated with the Kronos Quartet on a piece written for them along with drumset titled Anomaly, premiered at the San Francisco Jazz Festival in October 2007. And in 2011 he worked with So Percussion on a series of pieces called Drumkit Quartets as part of Meet the Composer's Three City Dash. In 2006, he released Mobile, which he started working on in various hotel rooms during Wilco tour when he couldn't practice the drums.

Kotche has also collaborated with Chicago contemporary chamber music sextet Eighth Blackbird.

In 1997, Kotche began collaborating with Portland, OR folk singer/songwriter Bill Santen a.k.a. Birddog. Kotche recorded three CDs and toured with Birddog until 2001. Birddog's debut release, The Trackhouse, the Valley, the Liquor Store Drive Thru, was produced by Elliott Smith and Paul K.

Circa 2013, Kotche performed Reach Out I'll Be There on a tuned array of common kitchen items in the Delta Faucet division of Masco's "Instrumental Touch" commercial for their touch-sensing line of faucets.

== Education ==
Kotche went to Lake Park High School in Roselle, IL, where he was a member of the drum line in the Lake Park Marching Band, and later the University of Kentucky, where he honed his musical skill and technique and obtained a bachelor's degree in music performance. Glenn was also a member of The Cavaliers Drum and Bugle Corps from Rosemont, Illinois in 1989, playing in the snare line. He received the Distinguished Alumnus Award from UK's College of Fine Arts in 2007.

== Discography ==
=== Solo recordings ===
- Introducing (2002)
- Next (2003)
- Mobile (2006)
- Adventureland (2014)
- Drumkit Quartets (2016) - Glenn Kotche / So Percussion

=== Group recordings ===
Wilco:

- Yankee Hotel Foxtrot (2002)
- Wilco Book CD (2003)
- More Like the Moon EP (2003)
- A Ghost Is Born (2004)
- Kicking Television: Live in Chicago (2005)
- Sky Blue Sky (2007)
- Wilco (The Album) (2009)
- The Whole Love (2011)
- Star Wars (2015)
- Schmilco (2016)
- Ode to Joy (2019)
- Cruel Country (2022)
- “Cousin” (2023)

Birddog:

- "The Trackhouse, the Valley, the Liquor Store Drive Thru" (1997)
- "Ghost of the Season" (1998)
- "A Sweet and Bitter Fancy" (2001)

On Fillmore:

- On Fillmore Wooden Box Set (2001)
- On Fillmore (2002)
- Sleeps with Fishes (2004)
- S&Man - Original Motion Picture Soundtrack (2006)
- Extended Vacation (2009)

Loose Fur:

- Loose Fur (2003)
- Born Again in the USA (2006)

The Minus 5:

- Down with Wilco (2003)
- The Gun Album (2006)

Fred Lonberg-Holm Quartet:

- A Valentine for Fred Katz (2001)
- Bridges Freeze Before Roads (2006)

7 Worlds Collide:

- The Sun Came Out (2009)

Andrew Bird:

- Useless Creatures (2008)

=== Appearances ===
- Paul K & The Weathermen - "Love is a Gas"
- Simon Joyner - Yesterday, Tomorrow, and Between (1998)
- Simon Joyner - The Lousy Dance (1999)
- Jim O'Rourke - Eureka (1999)
- Jim O'Rourke - Halfway to a Threeway (1999)
- Jim O'Rourke - Insignificance (2001)
- Bobby Conn - The Golden Age (2001)
- Stereolab - Sound-Dust (2001)
- Edith Frost - "Wonder Wonder" (2001)
- Chelsea Walls - Original Motion Picture Soundtrack (2002)
- Jeff Tweedy - Sunken Treasure: Live in the Pacific Northwest (2006)
- Sean Watkins - Blinders On (2006)
- The Nels Cline Singers - Draw Breath (2007)
- Philip Selway - Familial (2010)
- John Luther Adams - Ilimaq (2015)
- EOB (Ed O'Brien) - Earth (2020)
- Taylor Swift - The Tortured Poets Department (2024)
