= 7 Worlds Collide (album) =

Live album by 7 Worlds Collide
- Released: 26 November 2001
- Recorded: 2–6 April 2001 at the St. James Theatre, Auckland, New Zealand
- Genre: Alternative rock
- Length: 74:44
- Label: Parlophone

7 Worlds Collide chronology
One Nil (2001)	7 Worlds Collide (2001)	The Sun Came Out (2009)

Professional ratings
Review scores
Source	Rating
Allmusic	link
Rolling Stone	favorable link

7 Worlds Collide: Live at the St. James is an album released in 2001 by 7 Worlds Collide, a musical project of New Zealand singer-songwriter Neil Finn. It is a live recording culled from a series of five shows recorded at the St. James Theatre in Auckland, New Zealand from 2 to 6 April 2001. Notable members of Finn's band included Eddie Vedder, Johnny Marr, Ed O'Brien, Tim Finn, Sebastian Steinberg, Phil Selway, Lisa Germano, and Betchadupa (featuring Neil's son Liam Finn).

The album was credited to "Neil Finn and Friends"; Finn would later use "7 Worlds Collide" as the name of the ongoing collaborative project.

The title of this album, as well as the 7 Worlds Collide project, is derived from the line "When your seven worlds collide / whenever I am by your side" from Crowded House's 1993 single "Distant Sun".

== Track listing ==
=== CD release ===
All songs were written by Neil Finn, except where noted.

1. "Anytime" – 3:32
2. "Take a Walk" – 3:53
3. "The Climber" – 4:31
4. "Loose Tongue" (N. Finn, Jim Moginie) – 4:22
5. "Down on the Corner" (Johnny Marr) – 4:31
6. "There Is a Light That Never Goes Out" (Marr, Morrissey) – 4:22
7. "Paper Doll" (Lisa Germano) – 2:56
8. "Turn and Run" – 4:10
9. "Angels Heap" (N. Finn, Tim Finn) – 3:50
10. "Edible Flowers" (N. Finn, T. Finn) – 4:57
11. "Stuff and Nonsense" (T. Finn) – 4:20
12. "I See Red" (T. Finn) – 3:31
13. "She Will Have Her Way" – 4:48
14. "Parting Ways" (Eddie Vedder) – 5:50
15. "Weather with You" (N. Finn, T. Finn) – 5:26
16. "Paradise (Wherever You Are)" (N. Finn, T. Finn) – 4:06
17. "Don't Dream It's Over" – 5:31

=== DVD release ===
1. "Fall at Your Feet"
2. "Anytime"
3. "Hole in the Ice"
4. "Paper Doll"
5. "The Climber"
6. "Take a Walk"
7. "Last to Know"
8. "Down on the Corner"
9. "There Is a Light That Never Goes Out"
10. "Private Universe"
11. "Parting Ways"
12. "Driving Me Mad"
13. "Turn and Run"
14. "Loose Tongue"
15. "She Will Have Her Way"
16. "Angels Heap"
17. "Edible Flowers"
18. "Stuff and Nonsense"
19. "Four Seasons in One Day"
20. "Suffer Never"
21. "Cry Wolf"
22. "History Never Repeats"
23. "I See Red"
24. "Paradise (Wherever You Are)"
25. "Weather with You"
26. "Don't Dream It's Over"

== Personnel ==
- Neil Finn – vocals, electric guitar, acoustic guitar, acoustic 12 string guitar
- Tim Finn – vocals, acoustic guitar, piano
- Ed O'Brien – vocals, electric guitar, e-bow, acoustic guitar, effects
- Johnny Marr – vocals, electric guitar, ukulele, acoustic guitar
- Lisa Germano – vocals, keyboard, piano, violin, electric guitar, ukulele
- Sebastian Steinberg – bass, electric bass, double bass
- Phil Selway – drums
- Eddie Vedder – vocals, electric guitar, ukulele
- Paul Jeffery – keyboard, organ
- Liam Finn – electric guitar
- Chris Garland – electric guitar
- Joe Bramley – bass
- Matt Eccles – drums

== Charts ==
=== Weekly charts ===
Chart (2001–02)	Peak position
Australian DVD chart(ARIA Charts)	9

=== Year-end charts ===
Chart (2002)	Position
Australian DVD chart(ARIA Charts)	30

== Certifications ==
Region	Certification	Certified units/sales
Australia (ARIA)	Gold	7,500^{^}
^{^} Shipments figures based on certification alone.
