= Radiohead stage collapse =

2012 fatal accident in Toronto, Canada

Coordinates: 43.7421°N 79.4726°W

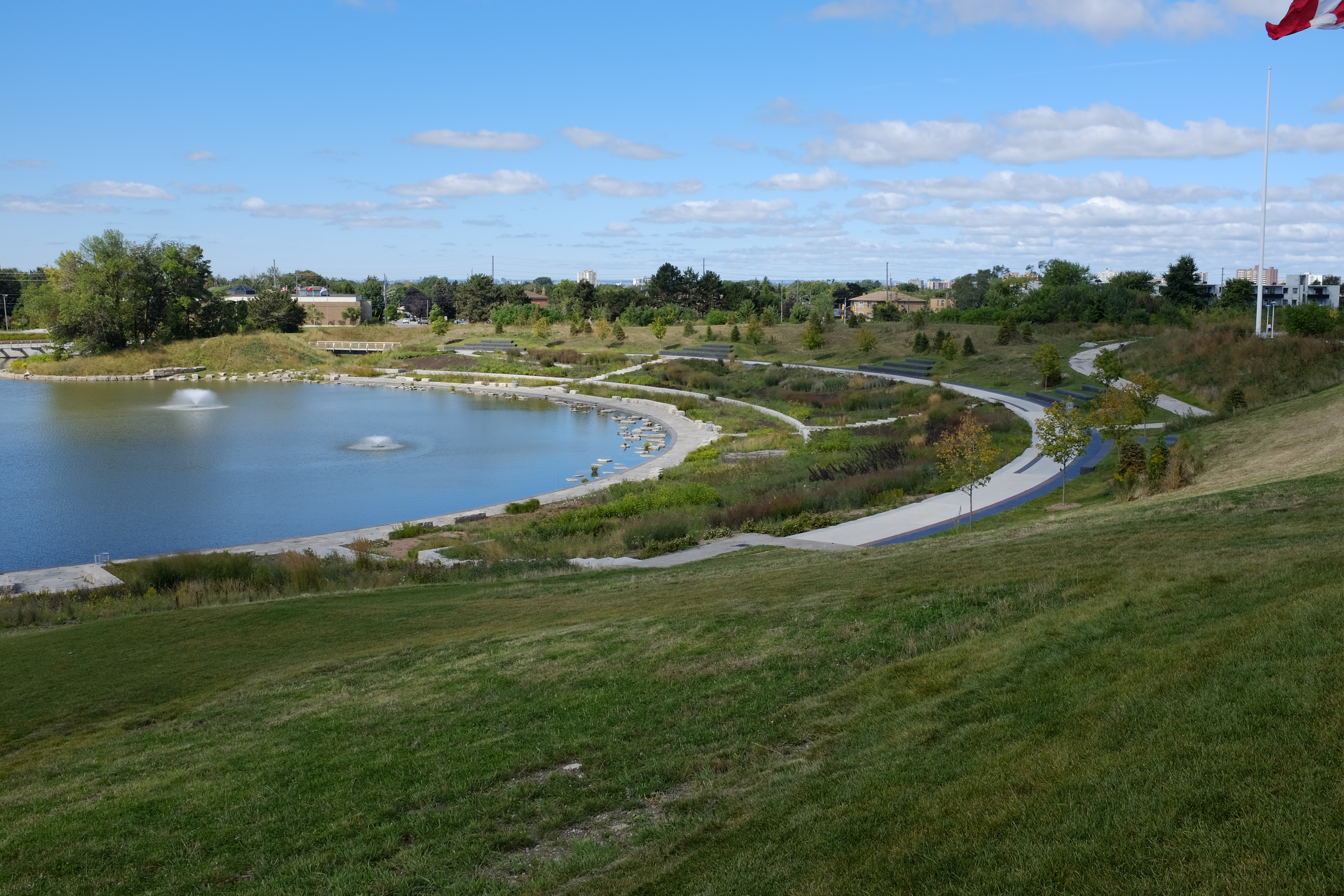
- Downsview Park in 2013
- Date: 16 June 2012
- Location: Downsview Park Toronto, Canada
- Cause: Design flaw in supporting structure
- Deaths: 1
- Injuries: 3
- Inquest: Dirk Huyer (March 2019); Nicola Mundy (October 2019)
- Charges: 13
- Convictions: 0

On 16 June 2012, the stage collapsed during the setup for a concert by the English rock band Radiohead in Downsview Park in Toronto, Canada. A drum technician, Scott Johnson, was killed, and three other members of Radiohead's road crew were injured. Radiohead and other musicians offered tributes and condolences.

In June 2013, Live Nation Canada Inc, two other organisations and an engineer were charged with 13 charges under Ontario health and safety laws. The hearing began in June 2015, but a mistrial was declared after the judge was appointed to Ontario Superior Court and lost jurisdiction. The case was dropped in September 2017 under the Jordan ruling, which puts time limits on cases. Radiohead condemned the decision.

In 2019, a Canadian inquest found that the roof had been too weak to support the stage equipment and returned a verdict of accidental death. Later that year, a British inquest found that inadequate technical advice and construction techniques had caused Johnson's death. In 2020, Professional Engineers Ontario found the engineer Domenic Cugliari guilty of professional misconduct and revoked his license.

== Collapse ==
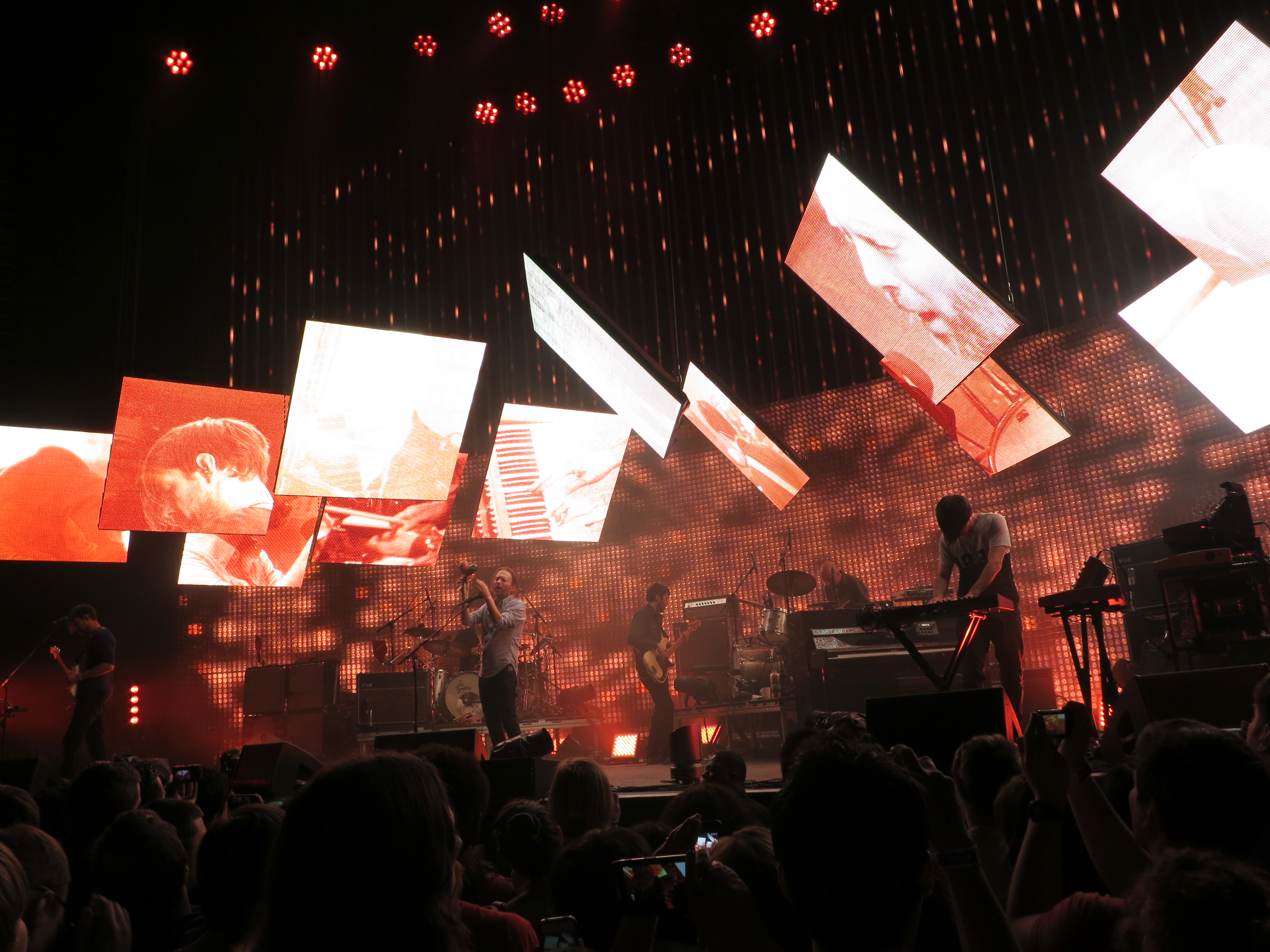
Radiohead performing on the King of Limbs tour in New Jersey, 2012

On 16 June 2012, the English rock band Radiohead were due to perform the final concert of their 2012 North American tour in support of their eighth album, The King of Limbs, in Downsview Park, Toronto. The tour had extensive visual components and required 11 trucks to transport its equipment.

Radiohead were due to be on stage for the soundcheck, but construction of the temporary stage was behind schedule. The band members were sequestered nearby while their road crew prepared equipment. The weather was calm, with light winds forecast. At 2pm, Radiohead’s business manager Ade Bullock noticed that scaffolding on the stage appeared to be drooping, and took a photograph. He did not challenge it as he was not knowledgeable about engineering.

At 4pm, an hour before gates were due to open to concertgoers, the stage roof collapsed. Radiohead's drummer, Philip Selway, recalled a sound "like an enormous cabinet of glasses falling over". Radiohead's drum technician, Scott Johnson, was killed instantly by a falling video monitor weighing 2,270 kilograms (5,000 lb). Three other members of Radiohead's crew were injured, one seriously. The band's light show and much of their musical equipment was also destroyed. The concert was cancelled and Radiohead's European tour was postponed.

Radiohead considered abandoning touring after the collapse. Selway said: "When we came away, it was, 'God, do we want to do this ever again?' If it causes this, can we do it?" They decided to continue as a way of dealing with the trauma. Three weeks later, at a vigil before their next performance, Radiohead offered their crew the chance to leave; all chose to stay. In 2013, the singer, Thom Yorke, wrote that completing the tour was his biggest achievement: "I was terrified about it, then it got dark, but in the end we were all very proud of managing to pull it off." Pitchfork described the collapse as part of a streak of stage accidents, such as the 2011 Indiana State Fair stage collapse, that had prompted "industry soul-searching".

== Tributes ==
Radiohead's drum technician, Scott Johnson, 33, from Doncaster, South Yorkshire, had also worked with acts including Robyn, the Killers, Keane and White Lies. Shortly after the collapse, Selway wrote a tribute on Radiohead's website, describing him as "a lovely man, always positive, supportive and funny; a highly skilled and valued member of our great road crew". Other tributes came from artists including Keane, White Lies and Caribou, the Canadian band set to open for Radiohead. Elton John called Johnson's family to offer his condolences.

All of Radiohead and their road crew attended Johnson's funeral. In July, Radiohead paid tribute to Johnson at their first concert after the collapse, in Nîmes, France, performing their song "Reckoner" as an encore while screens showed images of Johnson. Selway's second solo album, Weatherhouse (2014), and Radiohead's ninth album, A Moon Shaped Pool (2016), are dedicated to Johnson.

Johnson's parents used royalties from Keane's charity EP Upstairs At United – Vol. 5, along with almost £3,500 raised by Radiohead fans and £1,200 of church and family donations, to create the Scott Johnson Bursary Fund. The fund distributes drum kits to schools and teachers with help from Yamaha and the music shop where Johnson once worked. In 2015, Selway, Stephen Morris of New Order and Guy Garvey of Elbow presented a drum kit in Johnson's honour to the Manchester Central Library.

== Legal proceedings ==
=== 2015 trial ===
In June 2013, after a year-long investigation, the Ontario Ministry of Labour charged Live Nation Canada Inc, Live Nation Ontario Concerts GP Inc, Optex Staging & Services Inc and the engineer who designed the stage, Domenic Cugliari, with 13 charges under Ontario health and safety laws. The prosecutor, Dave McCaskill, sought to prove that Cugliari miscalculated the weight of the stage roof and its attachments by approximately 7,260 kg (16,010 lb). Live Nation issued a statement denying any wrongdoing and vowing to "vigorously" defend itself.

The hearing was set to begin in June 2015, but was postponed to November as Optex had no lawyer; the Optex president, Dale Martin, eventually represented himself. All defendants pleaded not guilty. After 15 days of hearings, during which Radiohead's managers and crew gave evidence, the court ordered another 15 days throughout 2016. In May 2016, following the defence's request for more time to present its case, the court scheduled further dates in December and January. In June, the defence persuaded the judge, Shaun Nakatsuru, to drop two charges against Live Nation and one charge against Optex for lack of evidence.

In June 2017, Nakatsuru declared a mistrial as he had been appointed to the Ontario Superior Court and had lost jurisdiction. As a new trial would not have begun until May 2018, the new judge, Ann Nelson, ruled in favour of the defendants' application to have the case dropped under the Jordan ruling, which gives defendants the right to be tried within a "reasonable" timeframe. Nakatsuru had declined a previous application from the defence. Radiohead released a statement saying: "We are appalled by the decision … This is an insult to the memory of Scott Johnson, his parents and our crew. It offers no consolation, closure or assurance that this kind of accident will not happen again." Radiohead's management and Johnson's parents met British members of parliament, who wrote to the Canadian High Commission demanding the case be reopened.

On 19 July 2018, Radiohead performed at Scotiabank Arena, their first performance in Toronto since the collapse. On stage, Yorke condemned the lack of progress in the case. Radiohead held a minute of silence before performing their final song, the 1997 single "Karma Police". The Vice journalist Jill Krajewski observed new meaning in the lyrics "karma police / arrest this man". Yorke said in September 2019:

Believe me, words cannot describe the feelings that went along with it for us and our crew, but on the act of going and playing in Toronto, and standing in silence, I hope that our silence is our last word on the subject. I felt that our silence was a bell that sounded very loudly and I hope people heard it, for Scott's sake and for his family ... We know exactly whose fault it was and they'll be held accountable at some point.

=== 2019 inquests ===
In November 2017, it was announced that the chief coroner of Ontario, Dirk Huyer, would hold an inquest into Johnson's death. In a statement, Radiohead welcomed the inquest but said it would provide no justice for the Johnsons, and urged the Canadian authorities to reopen the case. The inquest began on 25 March 2019 and ran until April 10, with testimonies from 25 witnesses, including Selway, Optex employees and Johnson's father.

The Optex president, Dale Martin, testified that the stage design had called for a truss component that Optex did not have, that Optex staff had known about the problem for years, and that he had alerted engineer Cugliari many times. Cugliari admitted that his design contained errors but said he believed Optex had used the required truss. No building permits or inspections were obtained for the stage because Downsview Park is on land owned by the federal government. Ontario's building code does not apply to federal land, and no third-party oversight is required for temporary structures.

The inquest heard that the roof grid was too weak to bear the load of lights, screens and speakers, which weighed roughly 34,473 kg (76,000 lb) and crushed the pickup trusses. The roof design had been used since around 1990, and was originally approved by the engineer George Snowden, who was deceased by the time of the collapse. Snowden had been disciplined by Professional Engineers Ontario for his role in the fatal collapse of a scaffold on the Ambassador Bridge in 2000. Cugliari, who was an associate of Snowden, was also involved in the Ambassador Bridge collapse. Only Martin admitted culpability for the stage collapse, saying: "The system failed. Not just the truss. My people. Me. I'm responsible."

The five-person jury proposed 28 non-binding recommendations, including the creation of a group to develop and maintain standards and procedures for the live performance industry. A verdict of accidental death was returned. Radiohead released a statement praising the inquest as "constructive, thorough and fair-minded".

In October 2019, a second inquest was held in Johnson's hometown of Doncaster. The coroner, Nicola Mundy, found that inadequate technical advice and construction techniques were responsible for Johnson's death. Radiohead released a statement asking for "those others responsible to finally and publicly admit their part in this terrible incident".

=== 2020 professional misconduct hearing ===
In November 2020, following a hearing, Professional Engineers Ontario found Cugliari guilty of professional misconduct and said he had not properly reviewed the stage construction. His license was revoked and the company that had authorised the construction was fined $5,000. In a statement, Radiohead said Cugliari had "acknowledged a catalogue of errors and negligence on his part". They said the admissions were eight years too late, as Cugliari had retired and was "seemingly beyond any legal recrimination".
