= Familial (album) =

Studio album by Philip Selway
- Released: 30 August 2010
- Recorded: 2001–2010
- Studios: Radiohead's studio, Oxfordshire; Courtyard Studio, Oxford
- Genre: Folk rock
- Length: 32:43
- Labels: Bella Union; Nonesuch
- Producer: Ian Davenport

Philip Selway chronology
Familial (2010)	Running Blind (2011)

Familial is the debut solo studio album by the English musician Philip Selway, the drummer of the rock band Radiohead. It was released on 30 August 2010 in the UK and received mainly positive reviews.

== Music ==
Familial features Selway on acoustic guitar and vocals, with performances from the Wilco members Glenn Kotche and Pat Sansone and the 7 Worlds Collide artists Lisa Germano and Sebastian Steinberg. Pitchfork described the album as a collection of "hushed folk songs" in the tradition of the English singer-songwriter Nick Drake. It was recorded at Radiohead's studio in Oxfordshire and at Courtyard Studios, Oxford, owned by Radiohead's management. On 25 July, Selway released an EP, Running Blind, comprising songs left off Familial.

== Reception ==
Professional ratings
Aggregate scores
Source	Rating
Metacritic	66/100
Review scores
Source	Rating
AllMusic	3.5/5 stars
BBC	Favourable
Blare	3.5/5 stars
Drowned in Sound	5/10
One Thirty BPM	68%
Pitchfork	4.9/10

At Metacritic, which assigns a normalised rating out of 100 to reviews from mainstream critics, Familial has a score of 66, based on 18 critics, indicating "generally favourable" reviews. Andy Kellman of AllMusic complimented the lyrics, saying they "soothed rather than seethed" and wrote that "subtle, touching albums like this should be made more often". Pitchfork described Familial as a "modest, mannered record that prizes directness, simplicity and bittersweet sentiment above all, sometimes successfully, sometimes not".

== Track listing ==
All tracks are written by Philip Selway.

Familial track listing
No.	Title	Length
1.	"By Some Miracle"	2:37
2.	"Beyond Reason"	2:52
3.	"A Simple Life"	3:14
4.	"All Eyes on You"	2:31
5.	"The Ties That Bind Us"	3:41
6.	"Patron Saint"	3:27
7.	"Falling"	3:13
8.	"Broken Promises"	3:01
9.	"Don't Look Down"	5:03
10.	"The Witching Hour"	2:54
Total length:		32:33

iTunes and Japan bonus tracks
No.	Title	Length
11.	"Running Blind"	4:13
12.	"What Goes Around" (demo)

== Personnel ==
- Philip Selway
- Lisa Germano
- Sebastian Steinberg
- Glenn Kotche
- Pat Sansone
