= On Fillmore =

- Origin: Chicago, Illinois
- Genres: Jazz; alternative rock; indie rock; post-rock; instrumental rock
- Years active: 2000–2017
- Labels: Dead Oceans; Sony; Columbia
- Past members: Jim O'Rourke; Darin Gray; Glenn Kotche
- Website: onfillmore.com

On Fillmore is an American music duo consisting of Darin Gray and Glenn Kotche. The duo plays a style of jazz, alternative rock, post-rock, instrumental rock, and indie rock music. On Fillmore was established in Chicago, Illinois in 2000. The duo has released four studio albums, On Fillmore (2002), Sleeps with Fishes (2004), Extended Vacation (2009), and Happiness of Living (2017).

For their latest record, Happiness of Living, On Fillmore travelled to Rio De Janeiro, Brazil in December 2013 to record.

== Background ==
The duo is bassist Darin Gray of Dazzling Killmen and Tweedy, and drummer Glenn Kotche of Wilco.

== Music history ==
The band commenced as a musical entity in 2000, with releasing a studio album, On Fillmore, on July 27, 2002, with Locust Music. Their subsequent studio album, Sleeps with Fishes, was released on November 29, 2004, by Columbia Records in association with Sony Music Entertainment. They released, Extended Vacation, on November 3, 2009, from Dead Oceans, and it got a Metascore of a 67 with nine reviews.

== Members ==
Current members
- Darin Gray – bass
- Glenn Kotche – drums
Past members
- Jim O'Rourke – vocals, guitar

== Discography ==
Studio albums

- On Fillmore (July 27, 2002, Locust)
- Sleeps with Fishes (November 29, 2004, Columbia/Sony)
- Extended Vacation (November 3, 2009, Dead Oceans)
- Happiness of Living (March 24, 2017, Northern Spy Records)
