= David Nance =

American rock guitarist

David Nance is an American rock guitarist, singer and songwriter from Grand Island, Nebraska.

Nance was born in Grand Island and lived there as a child before moving to Omaha, where he gigged locally as a singer-songwriter. He played live and self-produced and released lo-fi demo recordings which brought him local attention; some of these were whole-album covers of records such as Berlin by Lou Reed, Goats Head Soup by the Rolling Stones, and Beatles for Sale. In 2013 he relocated to Los Angeles where he recorded three albums' worth of material, all of which he scrapped, describing them as "failed attempts". In 2016, his album More than Enough was picked up for distribution by Ba Da Bing Records. He followed in 2017 with a second release for Ba Da Bing, Negative Boogie, and toured the United States after it was issued in July of that year. Despite having been recorded formally in a studio, the album retained the lo-fi styling of Nance's earlier work.

== Discography ==
=== Studio albums ===
- Let's Argue (Unread MC 2012)
- Lush Bruises Suck Rice and Barley (Unread MC 2013)
- Actor's Diary (Grapefruit Records LP 2013)
- Half Assed for Posterity (Unread MC 2013)
- More Than Enough (Ba Da Bing LP 2016)
- Negative Boogie (Ba Da Bing LP 2017)
- Peaced and Slightly Pulverized (as David Nance Group) (Trouble in Mind LP 2018)
- Staunch Honey (Trouble In Mind LP 2020)
- David Nance & Mowed Sound (Third Man Records 2024)

=== Cover albums ===
- Berlin (Self-released 2016)
- Goat's Head Soup (w/ Simon Joyner) (Grapefruit LP 2017)
- Doug Sahm and Band (Self-released 2017)
- Beatles for Sale (Self-released 2017)
- Duty Now for the Future (Self-released 2020)

=== Singles and EPs ===
- Live at WFMU (Forward Fast MC 2016)
- Amethyst (Richie Records, Testostertunes 7" vinyl single 2017)

== Other appearances ==
- Simon Joyner – Ghosts (Sing, Eunuchs! 2LP 2012)
