= Magic Neighbor =

Studio album by Lisa Germano
- Released: September 22, 2009
- Label: Young God Records
- Producer: Jamie Candiloro

Lisa Germano chronology
In the Maybe World (2006)	Magic Neighbor (2009)	No Elephants (2013)

Professional ratings
Review scores
Source	Rating
AllMusic	3.5/5 stars
Pitchfork	7.3/10
PopMatters	8/10 stars

Magic Neighbor is an album by musician Lisa Germano. It was released in 2009 through Young God Records. It peaked at #6 on Billboard's New Age Albums chart.

== Track listing ==
All tracks composed by Lisa Germano; except where indicated

1. "Marypan"
2. "To the Mighty One"
3. "Simple"
4. "Kitty Train"
5. "The Prince of Plati"
6. "A Million Times"
7. "Magic Neighbor"
8. "Suli-Mon"
9. "Snow"
10. "Painting the Doors" (Germano, Harold Budd)
11. "Cocoon"

== Personnel ==
- Sebastian Steinberg - baritone guitar, mandolin, bass
- Greg Leisz - pedal steel
