= Homesongs =

Studio album by Adem
- Released: 29 March 2004
- Genre: Folk
- Length: 44:38
- Label: Domino
- Producer: Adem

Adem chronology
Homesongs (2004)	Love and Other Planets (2006)

Singles from Homesongs
- 1. "These Are Your Friends" Released: 2004; 2. "Ringing in My Ear" Released: 2004

Professional ratings
Aggregate scores
Source	Rating
Metacritic	83/100
Review scores
Source	Rating
AllMusic	4/5 stars
DIY	3.5/5 stars
The Guardian	4/5 stars
The Independent	4/5 stars
Mojo	4/5 stars
Paste	4/5 stars
Pitchfork	8.3/10
Q	4/5 stars
Rolling Stone	3/5 stars
Tiny Mix Tapes	4/5

Homesongs is the debut album by British singer-songwriter Adem Ilhan, who was previously best known for his work in the band Fridge with Kieran Hebden. It contains the singles "Ringing in My Ear" and "These Are Your Friends". The album's title alludes to the fact that the album was recorded entirely at Ilhan's own house. The album's title also comes from the themes of "home" in all the songs.

== Track listing ==
All tracks are written by Adem Ilhan.

No.	Title	Length
1.	"Statued"	4:40
2.	"Ringing in My Ear"	3:56
3.	"Gone Away"	3:32
4.	"Cut"	5:11
5.	"These Are Your Friends"	6:34
6.	"Everything You Need"	4:03
7.	"Long Drive Home"	3:36
8.	"Pillow"	5:04
9.	"One in a Million"	3:25
10.	"There Will Always Be"	4:30
