= The Lousy Dance =

Studio album by Simon Joyner
- Released: 19 October 1999
- Recorded: April 1999
- Genre: Indie Folk, Alternative, Lo-Fi
- Length: 49:44
- Label: Truckstop
- Producer: Michael Krassner

Simon Joyner chronology
Yesterday, Tomorrow, And In Between (1998)	The Lousy Dance (1999)	Hotel Lives (2001)

Professional ratings
Review scores
Source	Rating
AllMusic	4.5/5 stars
Pitchfork Media	7.8/10

The Lousy Dance is an album by Simon Joyner, released in 1999.

== Critical reception ==
Exclaim! called the album "a modern folk sound—campfire confessionals done up in a cosmopolitan context." CMJ New Music Report praised Joyner's "quiet intensity and folk-like musical rudiments."

== Track listing ==
All tracks are written by Simon Joyner.

No.	Title	Length
1.	"The Lousy Dance"	4:17
2.	"I Will Find You"	5:46
3.	"Fool's Gold On Main Street"	7:15
4.	"Long Dark Night"	6:48
5.	"It Will Never Be This Way Again"	5:14
6.	"When She Drops Her Veil"	6:05
7.	"The Rain Asked For A Holiday"	6:23
8.	"John Train's Blues"	7:52

== Personnel ==
- Simon Joyner – Vocals, Guitar
- Jessica Billey – Violin
- Jeb Bishop – Trombone
- Chris Deden – Percussion
- Joe Ferguson – Engineering
- Ryan Hembrey – Bass
- Wil Hendricks – Piano, Accordion, Vibes
- Charles Kim – Pedal Steel
- Glenn Kotche – Drums, Percussion
- Michael Krassner – Electric Guitar, Production, Engineering
- Fred Lonberg-Holm – Cello, String and Horn Arrangements
- Ernst Long – Flugelhorn, Trumpet
- Ken Vandermark – Clarinet
