= On the Way Down from the Moon Palace =

Studio album by Lisa Germano
- Released: 1991
- Studio: September, Indianapolis, Indiana
- Genre: Pop, roots rock
- Length: 39:45
- Label: Major Bill
- Producer: Lisa Germano

Lisa Germano chronology
On the Way Down from the Moon Palace (1991)	Happiness (1993)

Professional ratings
Review scores
Source	Rating
AllMusic	3/5 stars

On the Way Down from the Moon Palace is the debut album by Lisa Germano. It was released in 1991 by her label, Major Bill Records. After she signed with Capitol in 1992, it was released in Japan by EMI, Capitol's parent company. The album was reissued by Egg Records in 1993 and Koch in 1999.

== Track listing ==
1. "On the Way Down from the Moon Palace"
2. "Guessing Game or The Music Business"
3. "Blue Monday"
4. "Calling..."
5. "Hangin' with a Deadman"
6. "Screaming Angels Dancing in Your Garden"
7. "Riding My Bike"
8. "Simply Tony"
9. "Dig My Own Grave"
10. "Cry Baby"
11. "Bye Bye Little Doggie"
12. "The Other One"
13. "Dark Irie"

== Personnel ==
- Lisa Germano – vocals, fiddle, violin
- Jeff Hedback – bass guitar
- Kenny Aronoff – drums
