= No Elephants =

Studio album by Lisa Germano
- Released: February 12, 2013
- Label: Badman Recording Co.

Lisa Germano chronology
Magic Neighbor (2009)	No Elephants (2013)

No Elephants is the ninth release by musician Lisa Germano. It was released in 2013 through Badman Recording Co.

== Track listing ==
All tracks composed by Lisa Germano

1. Ruminants
2. No Elephants
3. Apathy and the Devil
4. Back to Earth
5. Haunted
6. A Feast
7. Up in the Air
8. Dance of the Bees
9. Diamonds
10. ...And So On
11. Last Straws for Sale
12. Strange Bird
