= Running Blind (EP) =

EP by Philip Selway
- Released: 25 July 2011
- Genre: Alternative rock
- Length: 15:26
- Label: Nonesuch/Bella Union

Philip Selway chronology
Familial (2010)	Running Blind (2011)	Weatherhouse (2014)

Running Blind is an EP by the English musician Philip Selway. It was released on 25 July 2011 in the UK and 30 August in the US. Running Blind comprises four songs left off Selway's debut album, Familial (2010), re-recorded with a full band.

== Reception ==
Professional ratings
Review scores
Source	Rating
Pitchfork Media	5.8/10
PopMatters	5/10 stars

Joe Tangari from Pitchfork Media praised "What Goes Around", writing that it "delivers a well-crafted melody," and said that the EP was a slight improvement over Familial. A review from PopMatters found that the songs "just weren't good enough" and "exposed more weaknesses than necessary".

== Track listing ==
1. "Running Blind" - 4:18
2. "All in All" - 3:04
3. "Every Spit and Cough" - 4:09
4. "What Goes Around" - 3:55
