= Love and Other Planets =

Studio album by Adem
- Released: 24 April 2006 (UK)
- Genre: Post-rock
- Length: 45:06
- Label: Domino

Adem chronology
Homesongs (2004)	Love and Other Planets (2006)	Takes (2008)

Love and Other Planets is the second album by British singer/songwriter Adem Ilhan, who records under the name Adem. According to Ilham, the album itself is a loose concept album about "space. And cosmic things. And people."

== Critical reception ==
Professional ratings
Aggregate scores
Source	Rating
Metacritic	74/100
Review scores
Source	Rating
Allmusic	4.5/5 stars
Drowned In Sound	(8/10)
The Guardian	3/5 stars
Pitchfork	(6.2/10)
PopMatters	(8/10)
Slant	4/5 stars

Love and Other Planets was met with "generally favorable" reviews from critics. At Metacritic, which assigns a weighted average rating out of 100 to reviews from mainstream publications, this release received an average score of 74, based on 24 reviews.

== Track listing ==
All tracks are written by Adem Ilhan.

No.	Title	Length
1.	"Warning Call"	4:12
2.	"Something's Going to Come"	3:22
3.	"X Is for Kisses"	4:54
4.	"Launch Yourself"	3:36
5.	"Love and Other Planets"	3:45
6.	"Crashlander"	3:21
7.	"Sea of Tranquility"	3:21
8.	"You and Moon"	3:42
9.	"Last Transmission from the Lost Mission"	3:08
10.	"These Lights Are Meaningful"	4:02
11.	"Spirals"	3:22
12.	"Human Beings Gather 'Round"	3:49
13.	"Waves" (iTunes bonus track)	2:55
