= Lullaby for Liquid Pig =

Studio album by Lisa Germano
- Released: April 15, 2003
- Genres: Alternative rock, dream pop, folk rock
- Labels: Ineffable, iMusic
- Producers: Jamie Candiloro, Joey Waronker, Lisa Germano

Lisa Germano chronology
Rare, Unusual or Just Bad Songs (2002)	Lullaby for Liquid Pig (2003)	In the Maybe World (2006)

Professional ratings
Review scores
Source	Rating
AllMusic	3/5 stars
Pitchfork	8.5/10
Tiny Mix Tapes	4.5/5 stars

Lullaby for Liquid Pig is an album by alternative rock artist Lisa Germano. It was released in 2003 on the ARTISTdirect imprints iMusic and Ineffable Records, and re-released in 2007 on Young God Records. Lullaby for Liquid Pig is her first studio album since 1998's Slide. Some versions included a bonus disc of live and home-recorded material.

== Track listing ==
All tracks composed by Lisa Germano

1. "Nobody's Playing"
2. "Paper Doll"
3. "Liquid Pig"
4. "Pearls"
5. "Candy"
6. "Dream Glasses Off"
7. "From a Shell"
8. "It's Party Time"
9. "All the Pretty Lies"
10. "Lullaby for Liquid Pig"
11. "Into the Night"
12. "....to Dream"

== Personnel ==
- Craig Ross, Johnny Marr – guitar
- Sebastian Steinberg – bass
- Neil Finn – keyboards
- Butch Norton, Joey Waronker, Wendy Melvoin – drums
