= Slush (album) =

Studio album by OP8
- Released: 1997
- Recorded: Wavelab, Tucson, Arizona
- Genre: Indie rock, alt-country
- Length: 51:12
- Label: Thirsty Ear (US)
- Producer: OP8, Lisa Germano

Professional ratings
Review scores
Source	Rating
AllMusic	4/5 stars
Alternative Rock	7/10
The Encyclopedia of Popular Music	3/5 stars

Slush is the 1997 debut album by OP8, a band formed by Lisa Germano, Howe Gelb of the alternative country band Giant Sand, and Joey Burns and John Convertino of Calexico and Giant Sand. The album was released on Thirsty Ear and features covers of "Sand" by Lee Hazlewood as well as "Round and Round" by Neil Young.

Its generally mainstream, jazz-inflected songwriting is at times counterbalanced by odd sonic details, including detuned melodic fragments and synthetic noises.

== Background ==
The idea for the album began in 1997 when 4AD founder Watts-Russell approached a number of the label's musicians with the idea that each act would find another person or band to collaborate with on three songs. The recordings would then be released on 4AD as a monthly series of EPs. Germano worked on and recorded several tracks with the alternative country band Giant Sand.

However, Watts-Russell was unhappy with many of the recordings and scrapped the idea. Germano and the members of Giant Sand liked the results and had enjoyed their collaboration, and despite the label's lack of interest, they recorded a full album in less than a week. Managers for Germano and Giant Sand made a deal with Thirsty Ear Recordings to release the album as a one-off project under the name OP8.

Giant Sand's lead vocalist Howe Gelb briefly considered a follow-up OP8 album with Juliana Hatfield following her vocals on the track "Temptation of Egg" from the band's 2000 album Chore of Enchantment. He said in a 2001 interview that he loved "her voice so much I don't want to hear the other instruments so much as just to hear her sing." However he eventually abandoned the idea.

== Reception ==
The album was a critical success. In 1997 [MTV] invited the band to perform several of the songs from the album on their show Alternative Nation, giving Germano much-needed exposure.

"If I Think of Love" became somewhat popular; she released a stripped-down version on her next album, 1998's Slide. Writing for Musician in 1998, Jon Young said that the song "at first...seems perfect for your favorite pinhead diva; it takes a little longer to notice the bitterness in lyrics like "better off/shut off."

== Track listing ==
1. "Sand" (Lee Hazlewood) – 4:37
2. "Lost in Space" (Joey Burns) – 4:07
3. "If I Think of Love" (Lisa Germano) – 3:15
4. "Leather" (Howe Gelb) – 6:04
5. "It's a Rainbow" (Germano) – 4:08
6. "OP8" (Gelb/Convertino/Burns) – 4:45
7. "Cracklin' Water" (Gelb) – 6:29
8. "Never See It Coming" (Burns/Gelb) – 4:05
9. "Tom, Dick & Harry" (Germano) – 4:20
10. "The Devil Loves L.A." (Gelb) – 4:01
11. "Round and Round" (Neil Young) – 6:21

== Sources ==
- Aston, Martin. Facing the Other Way: The Story of 4AD. London: The Friday Project, 2013. ISBN 978-0-00-748961-9
