= Weatherhouse (album) =

Studio album by Philip Selway
- Released: 6 October 2014
- Recorded: late January 2013–late January 2014
- Studio: Radiohead Quarters (Oxford); The Strongroom (London)
- Genre: Art rock
- Length: 37:02
- Label: Bella Union
- Producer: Adem Ilhan

Philip Selway chronology
Running Blind (2011)	Weatherhouse (2014)	Let Me Go OST (2017)

Singles from Weatherhouse
- 1. "Coming Up for Air" Released: 31 May 2014; 2. "It Will End In Tears" Released: 22 September 2014

Weatherhouse is the second album by the English musician Philip Selway, released on 6 October 2014. It features musicians in Selway's backing band. On 31 July 2014 a music video was released for the first single from the album, "Coming Up for Air". On 22 September 2014 a music video was released for another song on the album, "It Will End In Tears". Whereas Selway's first album, Familial (2010), was largely acoustic, Weatherhouse features more ambitious arrangements and electronic elements.

== Critical reception ==
Professional ratings
Aggregate scores
Source	Rating
Metacritic	65/100
Review scores
Source	Rating
The 405	6/10
AllMusic	3.5/5 stars
Consequence of Sound	C
DIY	4/5 stars
Drowned in Sound	7/10
musicOMH	3.5/5 stars
Rolling Stone	3/5 stars
Under the Radar	7/10

Weatherhouse received a score of 65 on Metacritic, indicating "generably favourable reviews". AllMusic gave the album three and a half out of 5, declaring it "an immaculately crafted, impossibly tasteful miniature". NME also gave it three and a half, writing that it showed that Selway was " a compelling artist in his own right" and shared elements with his work with Radiohead.

== Track listing ==
No.	Title	Length
1.	"Coming Up for Air"	3:38
2.	"Around Again"	3:22
3.	"Let It Go"	3:12
4.	"Miles Away"	4:36
5.	"Ghosts"	3:12
6.	"It Will End in Tears"	3:15
7.	"Don't Go Now"	2:55
8.	"Drawn to the Light"	4:26
9.	"Waiting for a Sign"	4:16
10.	"Turning It Inside Out"	4:10
Total length:		37:02

== Personnel ==
Personnel adapted from Weatherhouse liner notes.

- Philip Selway – vocals, drums, percussion, guitar, drum machine
- Adem Ilhan – bass guitar, bass synth, guitar, marimba, percussion, programming, drum machine, vocals; production, engineering
- Quinta – violin, viola, piano, Fender Rhodes, Hammond organ, Mellotron, clavichord, musical saw, marimba, percussion, vocals; additional production
- The Elysian Quartet
  - Emma Smith – violin ("It Will End In Tears", "Don't Go Now" and "Drawn To The Light")
  - Jennymay Logan – violin ("It Will End In Tears", "Don't Go Now" and "Drawn To The Light")
  - Vince Sipprell – viola ("It Will End In Tears", "Don't Go Now" and "Drawn To The Light")
  - Laura Moody – cello ("Ghosts", "It Will End In Tears", "Don't Go Now" and "Drawn To The Light")
- Marta Salogni – additional engineering
- Graeme Stewart – additional engineering
- David Wrench – mixing
- Mandy Parnell – mastering
- Chris Le Monde – mastering assistance
- Ted Dewan – artwork, sleeve design
