= Simon Joyner =

American musician

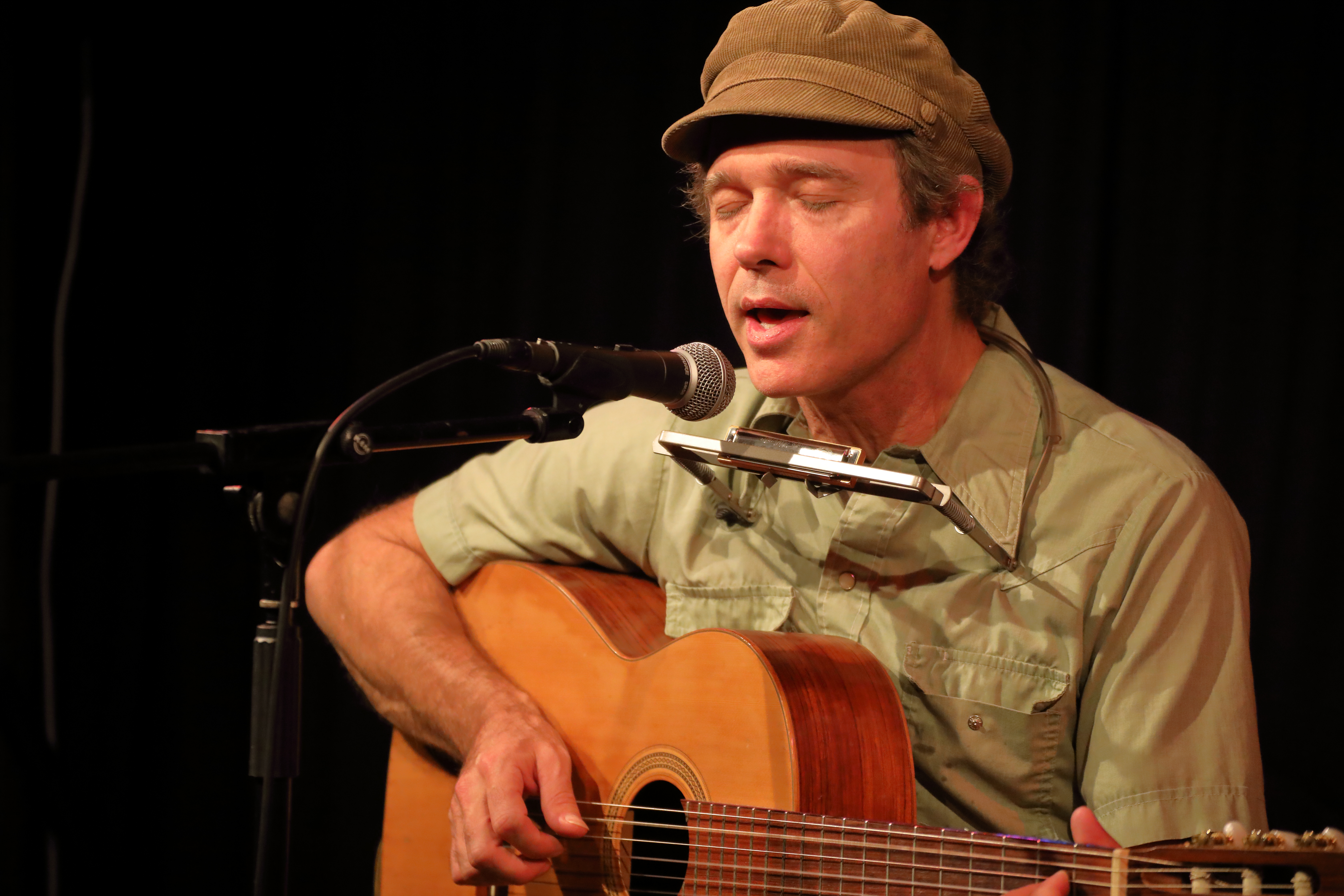
- Club W71, Weikersheim, 2019

Background information
- Born: August 9, 1971 (age 55)
- Origin: Omaha, Nebraska
- Genres: Americana
- Occupation: Singer-songwriter
- Years active: 1992–present
- Labels: Jagjaguwar, Team Love Records, Woodsist

Simon Joseph Joyner (born 9 August 1971) is an American singer-songwriter from Omaha, Nebraska. He has influenced the music of Bright Eyes, Kevin Morby and Gillian Welch. In the early 1990s, Beck listed Joyner in his top 10 albums when asked by Rolling Stone. He is also known for the so-called "Peel Incident," when British DJ John Peel played his album, The Cowardly Traveller Pays His Toll, from beginning to end on air. Joyner has collaborated with John Darnielle, of The Mountain Goats. He is named after Paul Simon.

Joyner has released music on various independent labels, including: Team Love, Jagjaguwar, Sing Eunuchs!, Catsup Plate, One-Hour, Shrimper, Brinkman, Secretly Canadian, and Unread. He is also the co-founder of Grapefruit Records.

Conor Oberst of Bright Eyes told NPR:

"The way he structures his songs, the importance he places on lyrics and the phrasing really became the template for my music," Oberst says. "It's really something that stays with you, and he has such an incredible body of work that there's a lot for somebody to digest."

Simon Joyner lives in Omaha with his wife and three children.

== Discography ==
=== Studio albums ===
- Umbilical Chords (One-Hour OH-002 MC 1992)
- Room Temperature (One-Hour OH-006 MC & CD 1993) (reissue as a 2LP-set by Jagjaguwar (JAG041) on December 6, 2005)
- The Cowardly Traveller Pays His Toll (Sing, Eunuchs! LP 1994) (reissue on LP and CD by Team Love (TL-016) on May 6, 2008)
- Heaven's Gate (Sing, Eunuchs! LP 1995) (released on CD by Brinkman Records in 1996)
- Songs for the New Year (Sing, Eunuchs! EUNUCH 38 LP 1997 / Shrimper Records SHR 92 CD 1997)
- Yesterday, Tomorrow, And in Between (Sing, Eunuchs! 2LP and CD 1998)
- The Lousy Dance (Truckstop LP and CD 1999)
- Hotel Lives (Truckstop 2LP and CD 2001)
- Lost with the Lights On (Jagjaguwar LP and CD March 16, 2004)
- Skeleton Blues (w/ The Fallen Men) (Jagjaguwar LP and CD November 21, 2006)
- Out into The Snow (Team Love LP and CD September 15, 2009)
- Ghosts (Sing, Eunuchs! 2LP 2012)
- Grass, Branch & Bone (WOODSIST 2015)
- Step into The Earthquake (BB*ISLAND – BBI 0322, Ba Da Bing! – BING136CD 2017)
- Pocket Moon (Grapefruit Records – GY9-4, BB*ISLAND – BBI 0372 2019)
- Songs From a Stolen Guitar (Grapefruit Records, BB*ISLAND - BBI 0471 2022)
- Coyote Butterfly (Grapefruit Records - GY14-9, BB*ISLAND - BBI 0571 2024)

=== Live albums ===
- Verbal Objects (Seagull 011 MC 2002) ("live recordings from the dreary West Coast, 2000")
- Blue Melody: Live From The South (Shrimper Records CD-R 2003) (ltd. ed. of 500 copies; live in Chapel Hill, NC, July 2000)
- Last Stand Blues: Live at the Barn Deluxxe (Chthonic Records Cassette, August 2, 2017)
- Some Only Let the Jukebox Hear Them Weep (Live in Phoenix 2014) (Self-released, 2020)
- WNYU Radio Show Sets 1997 & 2004 (Self-released, 2020)
- Simon Joyner Trio (Michael Krassner, Glenn Kotche) WSRN Radio Show 1998 (Self-released, 2020)
- Simon Joyner & The Bingo Trappers October 21, 2012 (Self-released, 2020)
- Live at Missy Sippy (Gent, Belgium) November 29, 2016 (Self-released, 2020)
- Live In Berlin At The Monarch November 27, 2019 (Self-released, 2020)
- Live in LA (Living Room Show 2-15-20) (Self-released, 2020)

=== Compilation albums ===
- Iffy (Sing, Eunuchs! MC 1993) (reissue on LP by Unread Records in 2003; ltd. ed. of 300 copies with handmade covers)
- Here Comes The Balloons 1992–1999 (Unread Records compilation MC 2002) (a collection of 16 un-earthed, acoustic ballads, yarble, and dirge, spanning 1992–1999)
- Beautiful Losers: Singles and Compilation Tracks 1994–1999 (Jagjaguwar JAG076 compilation 2LP and CD March 7, 2006)
- A Collection Of Tracks From The Team Love Library (Team Love digital download August 20, 2009)
- A Rag of Colts – Disgraced Songs 1987–2012 (Unread Records MC 2013) (Reissue on LP by Gertrude Tapes on May 1, 2018; ltd. ed. of 300 copies, black vinyl with black and white jackets, includes a glossy insert)

=== Singles and EPs ===
- "One for the Catholic Girls" (w/ The Fallen Men) (Wurlitzer Jukebox 7-inch vinyl single 1998)
- "The Christine EP"' (Secretly Canadian 12-inch vinyl and CD EP 1998)
- "The Motorcycle Accident"' (w/ The Fallen Men) (Roomtone 7-inch vinyl single 1999)
- "To Almost No One: Singer-Songwriter Series, Volumes 1–5" (w/ The Fallen Men) (Wee Black Skelf set of five 7-inch vinyl singles; the packaging was all hand-made and only 500 copies were assembled, 2001)
- "Here Come The Balloons" (Tongue Master 7-inch vinyl single 2003)
- "Time Slows Down in Dreams" (Team Love 7-inch vinyl single 2009)
- "The Red Bandana Blues" (Sing, Eunuchs! 7-inch vinyl single 2012)
- "Sonny/Megadeth" (Even More Important Records 7-inch lathe cut single 2014)
- "Train to Crazy Horse (Demo)" (People In A Position To Know 7-inch lathe cut single 2014)
- "You Got Under My Skin Again" (People In A Position To Know CDS/Lathe Cut 2014)
- "Why Don't You Come Back Around?" (w/ The Ghosts) (Ricardo 7-inch vinyl single 2016)
- "Salt Across Your Graves EP" (w/ The Ghosts) (People In A Position To Know 10-inch Lathe Cut)
- "Pocket Moon Demos" (People In A Position To Know 2019)

=== Splits and Collaborations ===
- Why You All So Thief? (Sing, Eunuchs! split 7-inch vinyl single w/ The Mountain Goats 1994)
- Grapefruit (w/ The Fallen Men) (Misplaced Music split 7-inch vinyl single w/ Two Dollar Guitar 2002)
- Stranger Blues (w/ Dennis Callaci) (Catsup Plate mini-LP November 2004) (recorded August 29, 2003, in the Callaci living room in Southern California; issued in a single edition of 500 one-sided LP's, silkscreened and hand assembled chipboard jackets in a "traditional" Catsup Plate brown butchers tape design scheme)
- Spiritual Rags (side-project w/ L. Eugene Methe and Chris Deden) (Unread Records/Grotto Records LP 2010)
- New Secrets (w/ Dennis Callaci) (Shrimper 2013) (the full length follow up to Stranger Blues)
- Bali Shag (Folktale 7-inch split vinyl single w/ L. Eugene Methe 2015)
- Was It Something We Sang? (w/ Refrigerator) (Shrimper MC 2016)
- Goat's Head Soup (w/ David Nance) (Grapefruit LP 2017)
- Low Fidelities & Infidelities (Demos & Covers) (Grapefruit Records CDR GY9-3 2019)
- Simon Joyner (w/ The Bruces) – Tell Me That Old Story Again / Cutty Sark (People in a Position To Know 7-inch 2019)

=== Compilation appearances ===
- "You And What Army?" (Sing, Eunuchs! various artists 1994) – "Jeff Engel Rules!" (w/ The Bruces)
- "Drowned In A Torrent Of Golden Grain" (Catsup Plate various artists 1994) – "Swing"
- "The Quick Brown Fox" (Food of the Gods various artists 1995) – "Last Night I Had A Conversation With God"
- "Our Salvation Is In Hand – Various Artists Acoustic Based Compilation" (Theme Park various artists CD 1995) – "Sorrow Floats"
- "Follow The Bouncing Ball" (Ba Da Bing! various artists CD 1995) – "I Would Not Try To Break Ties With Me"
- "Fast Forward #2" (Brinkman Records various artists 2CD 1995) – "Don't Begrudge A Man His Funeral"
- "Hayfever #1" (Hayfever various artists 7-inch 1995) – "Veterans' Hospital Song"
- "Strength Thru Ooij (A Waaghals-Brinkman 10th Anniversary Special)" (Brinkman CD 1995) – "Catherine"
- "Chutes And Ladders – A Cactus Gum Compilation" (Cactus Gum 1996) – "Flannery O'Connor"
- "How To Sink A Fleeing Ship (A Squirrel Energy Now! Compilation 1996)" – (Squirrel Energy Now 1996) – "Judas Blues"
- "Extra Walt!" (Walt various artists 2×7″ 1996) – "Milk"
- "Songs From A Room" (Sing, Eunuchs! various artists 7-inch vinyl EP 1996) – "Robin Hood"
- "Only Gold Was Good Enough For You" (limited edition 8-inch lathe cut record of 125 copies) (Gray Sky Micro Press September 7, 2013)

== Other appearances ==
- Bright Eyes – There Is No Beginning to the Story (2002, Saddle Creek)
