= In the Maybe World =

Studio album by Lisa Germano
- Released: July 18, 2006
- Genre: Folk
- Label: Young God Records

Lisa Germano chronology
Lullaby for Liquid Pig (2003)	In the Maybe World (2006)	Magic Neighbor (2009)

Professional ratings
Review scores
Source	Rating
AllMusic	3.5/5 stars
Pitchfork	7.5/10

In the Maybe World is an album by folk musician Lisa Germano. It was released in 2006 through Young God Records.

The album peaked at #3 on Billboard's Top New Age Albums in the summer of 2006, becoming her biggest chart hit in the US. "Red Thread" was a college radio hit.

== Track listing ==
All songs written by Lisa Germano.

1. "The Day"
2. "Too Much Space"
3. "Moon in Hell"
4. "Golden Cities"
5. "Into Oblivion"
6. "In the Land of Fairies"
7. "Wire"
8. "In the Maybe World"
9. "Red Thread"
10. "A Seed"
11. "Except for the Ghosts"
12. "After Monday"

== Personnel ==
- Brady Michaels, Craig Ross, Johnny Marr - guitar
- Sebastian Steinberg - bass
- Joey Waronker - drums
