= The Sun Came Out =

2009 studio album by 7 Worlds Collide

Studio album by 7 Worlds Collide (Neil Finn)
- Released: August 31, 2009
- Recorded: December 2008, Roundhead Studios, Auckland, New Zealand
- Genre: Alternative rock
- Length: 1 CD: 53:03; 2 CD: 94:02
- Labels: Columbia (UK); EMI (Elsewhere)

7 Worlds Collide (Neil Finn) chronology
7 Worlds Collide (2001)	The Sun Came Out (2009)	Goin' Your Way (2013)

Professional ratings
Review scores
Source	Rating
Mojo	4/5 stars
Pitchfork Media	(6.7/10)
Pop Matters	3/5 stars
Uncut	4/5 stars

The Sun Came Out is a charity studio album released on 31 August 2009 by 7 Worlds Collide, a musical project of New Zealand singer/songwriter Neil Finn for the benefit of Oxfam. The album was recorded at Finn's Roundhead Studios and is a follow-up to the 7 Worlds Collide live album of 2001. Contributors to the project include 7 Worlds Collide's 2001 alumni Johnny Marr, Ed O'Brien, Sebastian Steinberg, Phil Selway, Lisa Germano, Tim Finn and Liam Finn; as well as Don McGlashan, Bic Runga, Glenn Richards, KT Tunstall and Wilco members Jeff Tweedy, John Stirratt, Glenn Kotche and Pat Sansone.

The album was produced by Jim Scott and Neil Finn with additional production by Neil Baldock and is available as a single CD or as a double CD edition, it was also released on Vinyl LP.

== Wilco's involvement ==
According to Wilco bassist John Stirratt, in an interview with NZPA:

Neil Finn came to us backstage when we were playing in Chicago in 2008 and he had just had the idea of doing another 7 Worlds Collide and invited us soon after that. I think he got introduced to [us] through his kids and ... he thought we would be a good fit.

It was wonderful, Neil was amazing; there are not many guys who can oversee a project like that. First of all he owns a studio that has three functioning rooms in it with all the stuff. Not many people could have done that, and Neil is one and maybe (Paul) McCartney would be the other guy who could maybe do something like that.

We had sketched [the album] out very well [before arriving in New Zealand]...but obviously the fact that we did do it so fast is probably representative of New Zealand because we were all really relaxed and were having a lot of fun.

== Track listing ==
=== Single CD ===
#	Title	Writer(s)	Vocals	Length
1.	"Too Blue"	Johnny Marr, Jeff Tweedy	Johnny Marr, Neil Finn	4:01
2.	"You Never Know"	Jeff Tweedy	Jeff Tweedy	4:18
3.	"Little by Little"	Sharon Finn, Neil Finn	Sharon Finn, Neil Finn	3:18
4.	"Learn to Crawl"	Ed O'Brien, Johnny Marr, Liam Finn, Neil Finn	Neil Finn, Liam Finn	4:59
5.	"Girl, Make Your Own Mind Up"	Don McGlashan	Don McGlashan	5:29
6.	"Hazel Black"	KT Tunstall, Neil Finn	KT Tunstall, Neil Finn	3:46
7.	"Red Wine Bottle"	Liam Finn, Chris Garland, Johnny Marr	Liam Finn	4:26
8.	"Black Silk Ribbon"	KT Tunstall, Bic Runga	KT Tunstall, Bic Runga	3:48
9.	"Run in the Dust"	Johnny Marr	Johnny Marr	4:22
10.	"The Ties That Bind Us"	Phil Selway	Phil Selway	3:22
11.	"What Could Have Been"	Jeff Tweedy	Jeff Tweedy	3:39
12.	"Duxton Blues"	Glenn Richards	Glenn Richards	3:35
13.	"Reptile"	Lisa Germano	Lisa Germano	3:55

=== Double CD ===
==== Disc one ====
#	Title	Writer(s)	Vocals	Length
1.	"Too Blue"	Johnny Marr, Jeff Tweedy	Johnny Marr, Neil Finn	4:01
2.	"You Never Know"	Jeff Tweedy	Jeff Tweedy	4:18
3.	"Little by Little"	Sharon Finn, Neil Finn	Sharon Finn, Neil Finn	3:18
4.	"Learn to Crawl"	Ed O'Brien, Johnny Marr, Liam Finn, Neil Finn	Neil Finn, Liam Finn	4:59
5.	"Black Silk Ribbon"	KT Tunstall, Bic Runga	KT Tunstall, Bic Runga	3:48
6.	"Girl, Make Your Own Mind Up"	Don McGlashan	Don McGlashan	5:29
7.	"Run in the Dust"	Johnny Marr	Johnny Marr	4:22
8.	"Red Wine Bottle"	Liam Finn, Chris Garland, Johnny Marr	Liam Finn	4:26
9.	"The Ties That Bind Us"	Phil Selway	Phil Selway	3:22
10.	"Reptile"	Lisa Germano	Lisa Germano	3:53
11.	"Bodhisattva Blues"	Ed O'Brien, Liam Finn	Ed O'Brien, Neil Finn	3:55
12.	"What Could Have Been"	Jeff Tweedy	Jeff Tweedy	3:41

==== Disc two ====
#	Title	Writer(s)	Vocals	Length
1.	"All Comedians Suffer"	Neil Finn	Neil Finn	4:28
2.	"Duxton Blues"	Glenn Richards	Glenn Richards	3:35
3.	"Hazel Black"	KT Tunstall, Neil Finn	KT Tunstall, Neil Finn	3:46
4.	"Riding the Wave"	Tim Finn	Tim Finn	3:32
5.	"The Witching Hour"	Phil Selway	Phil Selway	3:03
6.	"Over and Done"	John Stirratt	John Stirratt	3:41
7.	"A Change of Heart"	Bic Runga, Dan Wilson	Bic Runga	3:14
8.	"Don't Forget Me"	Pat Sansone	Pat Sansone	3:38
9.	"Long Time Gone"	Don McGlashan	Don McGlashan	4:02
10.	"The Cobbler"	Elroy Finn	Elroy Finn	4:33
11.	"3 Worlds Collide"	Glenn Kotche, Phil Selway, Neil Baldock		3:06
12.	"The Water"	Sebastian Steinberg	Sebastian Steinberg	4:02

== Personnel ==
- Neil Finn
- Johnny Marr
- Ed O'Brien
- Phil Selway
- Sebastian Steinberg
- Lisa Germano
- Liam Finn
- Bic Runga
- Don McGlashan
- KT Tunstall
- Jeff Tweedy
- Spencer Tweedy
- John Stirratt
- Pat Sansone
- Glenn Kotche
- Glenn Richards
- Tim Finn

== Film ==
A film with the same name, which was made during the 20-day studio production and includes footage from a live performance in Auckland, had its world premiere on February 9, 2010 at the Santa Barbara International Film Festival.

== Charts ==
Chart (2009)	Peak position
Australian Albums (ARIA)	39
New Zealand Albums (RMNZ)	2
