= OP8 =

OP8 is the musical collaboration of the multi-instrumentalist Lisa Germano, Howe Gelb, Joey Burns and John Convertino. Joey Burns and John Convertino form the band Calexico together and have both been members of Gelb's Giant Sand. Their only album 1997's was Slush, which they toured as a band. Although a critical success the album did not perform commercially.

Gelb briefly considered a follow up OP8 album with Juliana Hatfield, following her vocals on the track "Temptation of Egg" from the Giant Sand's 2000 album Chore of Enchantment. He said in a 2001 interview that he loved Hatfield's "voice so much I don't want to hear the other instruments so much as just to hear her sing." However he eventually abandoned the idea.

== Lineup ==
- Lisa Germano: violin, piano, mandolin, vocals
- Howe Gelb: guitar, piano, vocals
- Joey Burns: bass, cello, guitar, vocals
- John Convertino: drums

== Discography ==
- Slush (1997 Thirsty Ear)

== Sources ==
- Aston, Martin. Facing the Other Way: The Story of 4AD. London: The Friday Project, 2013. ISBN 978-0-00-748961-9
