= Philip Selway =

English musician (born 1967)

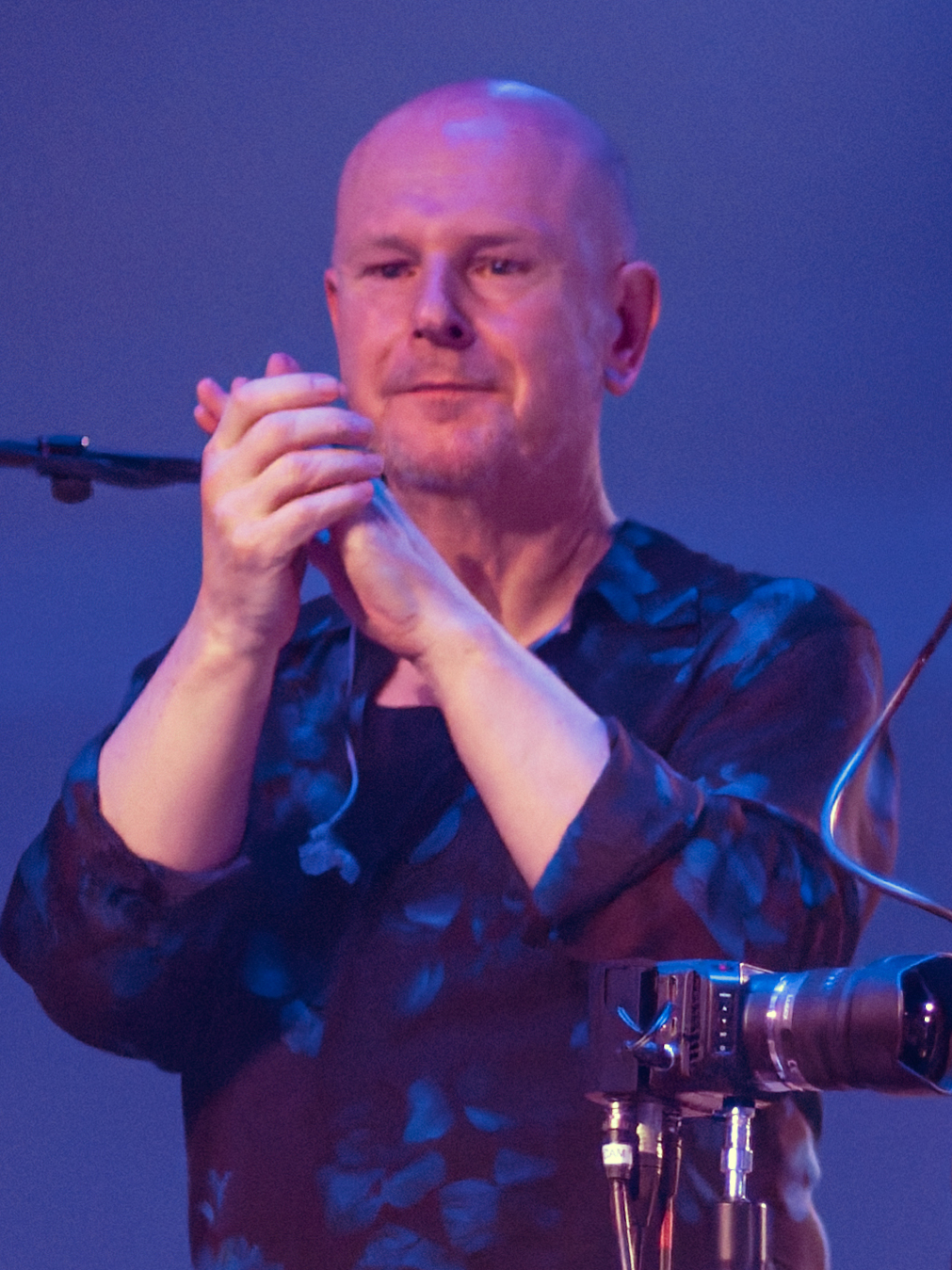
- Selway performing with Radiohead in 2025

Background information
- Born: Philip James Selway; 23 May 1967 (age 59); Abingdon, Oxfordshire, England
- Genres: Alternative rock; art rock; electronic; folk rock
- Occupation: Musician
- Instruments: Drums; percussion; guitar; vocals; piano
- Years active: 1985–present
- Labels: XL; Nonesuch; Bella Union
- Member of: Radiohead
- Formerly of: 7 Worlds Collide; the Weird Sisters
- Website: philipselway.com

Philip James Selway (born 23 May 1967) is an English musician and the drummer of the rock band Radiohead. He combines rock drumming with electronic percussion. Selway was inducted into the Rock and Roll Hall of Fame as a member of Radiohead in 2019.

In the 2000s, with musicians including the Radiohead guitarist Ed O'Brien, Selway toured and recorded with the 7 Worlds Collide project. In 2010, he released his debut solo album, Familial, comprising folk music. It was followed by Weatherhouse in 2014 and Strange Dance in 2023. Selway also composed the soundtrack for the 2017 film Let Me Go. In 2023, he played drums with Lanterns on the Lake. Selway is a supporter of the mental health charity Samaritans.

== Early life ==
Selway was born on 23 May 1967, in Abingdon, Oxfordshire. He began playing drums and guitar at the age of 15 for "the social cachet and love of music". His earliest influences were Joy Division, the Clash and the Velvet Underground. He described the Blondie drummer, Clem Burke, as his "drummer hero".

The members of Radiohead met while attending Abingdon School, a private school for boys. Selway was in the year above the guitarist Ed O'Brien, two years above the singer, Thom Yorke, and the bassist, Colin Greenwood, and five years above Colin's brother, the multi-instrumentalist Jonny Greenwood. In 1985, they formed On a Friday, the name referring to their usual rehearsal day in the school's music room.

After Abingdon, Selway studied English and history at Liverpool Polytechnic. He also worked as a TEFL teacher, a copyeditor, and as a drummer in pit bands for touring musicals.

== Career ==
=== Radiohead ===
Colin Greenwood, Jonny Greenwood, Ed O'Brien, and Phil Selway discussing OK Computer in 1997

In 1991, On a Friday signed a recording contract with EMI and changed their name to Radiohead. They found early success with their 1992 single "Creep". On tour in the US, Selway experienced impostor syndrome and his playing suffered. Radiohead's third album, OK Computer (1997), brought them fame and is often acclaimed as one of the greatest albums.

Selway discussing Kid A in 2000

With their fourth album, Kid A (2000), Radiohead began integrating electronic elements such as drum machines into their music. Selway said this widened his options and pushed him to create new dynamics, enabling him to express himself more creatively. Describing the process of arranging electronic tracks such as "Idioteque" for live performance, he said: "Trying to give that sense of the electronic in the piece but doing it through your 'normal' instrument playing — that naturally develops your own musical voice ... Performing those songs live definitely affected how I sounded and how I would approach drum parts."

While on tour for their albums The King of Limbs (2011) and A Moon Shaped Pool (2016), Radiohead performed with a second drummer, Clive Deamer. Selway said: "One [of us] played in the traditional way, the other almost mimicked a drum machine. It was push-and-pull, like kids at play, really interesting." For Radiohead's 2025 tour, Deamer was replaced by Chris Vatalaro. Selway contributed drums to "Impossible Knots" on Yorke's third solo album, Anima (2019), and drummed on two tracks from O'Brien's second solo album, Blue Morpho (2026).

In June 2012, Radiohead's stage collapsed before a show in Downsview Park in Toronto. Selway's drum technician, Scott Johnson, was killed. Selway wrote a tribute on Radiohead's website, describing him as "a lovely man, always positive, supportive and funny; a highly skilled and valued member of our great road crew". In 2019, Selway testified at an inquest into the collapse.

In 2008, Gigwise named Selway the 26th-greatest drummer, praising his "mathematical precision", and Mojo wrote that he and Colin Greenwood were "surely the most inventive rhythm section working close to the rock mainstream". O'Brien said Yorke's voice and Selway's drumming were the most distinctive parts of Radiohead, saying: "Philip has this incredible groove, and he has this weight to what he does ... Phil's feel is extraordinary." By 2011, Radiohead had sold more than 30 million albums worldwide. They were inducted into the Rock and Roll Hall of Fame in March 2019. In a speech at the induction ceremony, Selway said: "We may not be the greatest musicians around and we're certainly not the most media-friendly of bands. But we have become very adept at being Radiohead. And when that connects with people, it feels amazing."

=== Solo work ===
Selway wrote songs as a teenager, but concentrated on drumming after forming Radiohead. He began writing again later in life, but decided the songs had a distinct character that did not fit Radiohead. Selway's debut solo album, Familial, was released on 30 August 2010. It features Selway on acoustic guitar and vocals, and performances from the Wilco members Glenn Kotche and Pat Sansone and the 7 Worlds Collide artists Lisa Germano and Sebastian Steinberg. Pitchfork described it as a collection of "hushed" folk songs in the tradition of Nick Drake. Selway began a solo tour in 2011. On 25 July, he released an EP, Running Blind, comprising songs left off Familial rerecorded with a full band.

Selway's second solo album, Weatherhouse, was released on 6 October 2014, featuring more ambitious instrumentation and electronic elements. In 2017, Selway composed the score for the feature film Let Me Go, directed by Polly Steele. His third solo album, Strange Dance, was released on 24 February 2023. Selway did not drum on the album, finding he was out of practice and "not in the right mindset", and enlisted the Italian drummer Valentina Magaletti. He began a European tour that year.

Selway contributed a cover of the song "Fly" to The Endless Coloured Ways – The Songs of Nick Drake, a tribute album featuring various artists released on 7 July 2023. Selway cited Drake as a songwriting influence, and said: "If I had to shrink my record collection to just one artist, then that would be Nick Drake ... Nick Drake is an artist that I feel speaks to me and for me." On 8 December, Selway released a live album, Live at Evolution Studios, recorded with Vatalaro and the string quartet Elysian Collective in Evolution Studios, Oxford.

=== Other projects ===
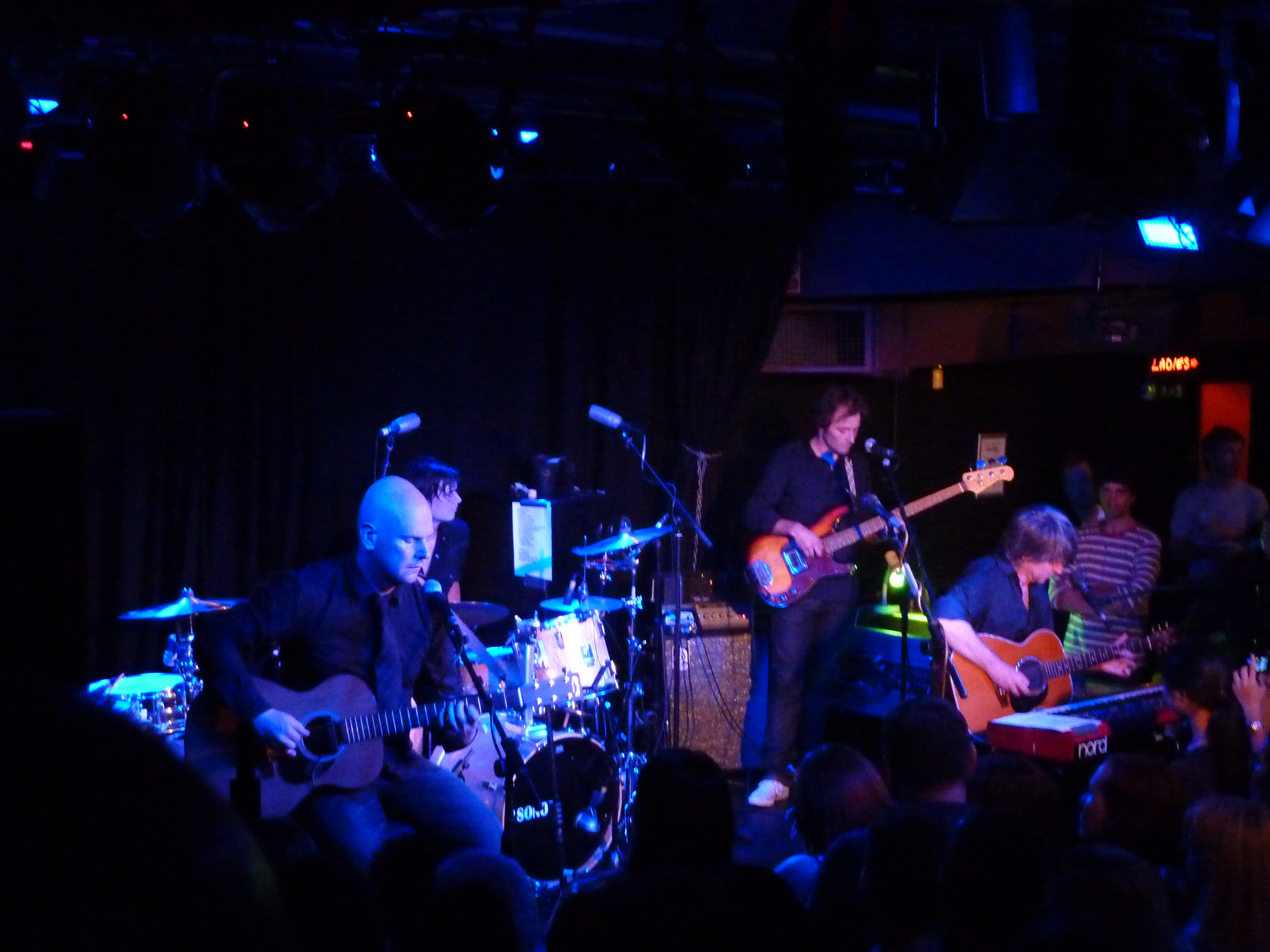
Selway (left) performing with 7 Worlds Collide, 2009

Selway performed with the band Dive Dive at the Oxford Zodiac in February 2005. For the 2005 film Harry Potter and the Goblet of Fire, Selway and Jonny Greenwood appeared as part of the wizard rock band Weird Sisters, alongside Jarvis Cocker and Steve Mackey of Pulp, Steven Claydon of Add N to (X), and Jason Buckle of All Seeing I.

With O'Brien, Selway contributed to the 2001 live album by 7 Worlds Collide, a band formed by the New Zealand songwriter Neil Finn. He also contributed to their 2009 studio album The Sun Came Out, for which he wrote and sang "Ties That Bind" and "Witching Hour". It was the first record for which Selway wrote songs and sang, at the encouragement of Finn. The Pitchfork critic Stephen M. Deusner was impressed by his vocals, praising his "subtle melodic hooks and arcing, textured voice".

Selway appears on "Rest on the Rock" and "Out of Light" on the album Before the Ruin by Roddy Woomble, Kris Drever, and John McCusker. He played drums and percussion on the fifth album by Lanterns on the Lake, Versions of Us (2023), after the departure of their previous drummer. According to the songwriter, Hazel Wilde, Selway helped them create a new version "whole other version" of the album and restored their confidence in the songs.

== Activism ==
Selway became involved with the mental health charity Samaritans while at university. He was a Samaritans ambassador for three years and volunteered as a telephone listener for 17 years. He continued volunteering as a listener during the height of Radiohead's success, which he said "probably kept my sanity". Selway is also an ambassador for Independent Venue Week, an initiative that promotes small music venues.

In 2014, Selway and O'Brien signed an open letter protesting a ban on guitars in British prisons and stating that music was important for rehabilitation. In August 2026, Selway, O'Brien and Yorke were among 211 artists to sign a letter calling for the prime minister, Andy Burnham, to reject proposals for further drilling in the Rosebank oil and gas field. In September, Selway backed the Pay It Forward Fund, which provides mental health support for artists and crew on tour.

== Personal life ==
Selway and his wife, Cait, have three sons. In May 2006, Radiohead cancelled a concert in Amsterdam after Selway's mother died suddenly. As of February 2023, Selway had recently moved to London. He is a fan of Oxford United FC.

== Discography ==
=== Studio albums ===
List of studio albums, with selected chart positions
Title	Details	Peak chart positions				
Title	Details	UK	UK Indie	SCO	US Folk	US Heat
Familial	Released: 30 August 2010 (UK); Label: Bella Union; Formats: CD, LP, download	185	–	–	8	7
Weatherhouse	Released: 6 October 2014 (UK); Label: Bella Union; Formats: CD, LP, download	—	46	–	25	—
Strange Dance	Released: 24 February 2023 (UK); Label: Bella Union; Formats: CD, LP, download	— (Note: Strange Dance did not enter the UK Albums Chart but peaked at number 66 on the UK Album Downloads Chart.)	8	46	—	—

=== Live albums ===
Title	Details
Live at Evolution Studios (With Elysian Collective)	Release: 8 December 2023; Label: Bella Union; Formats: Vinyl, download

=== Soundtrack albums ===
Title	Details
Let Me Go	Released: 15 September 2017; Label: Bella Union; Formats: LP, CD, download

=== EPs ===
Title	Details
Running Blind	Released: 25 July 2011; Label: Bella Union, Nonesuch; Formats: Vinyl, download

=== Singles ===
Title	Year	Album
"It Will End in Tears"	2014	Weatherhouse
"Around Again (The Acid Remix)"	2015	Non-album single

=== Guest appearances ===
Title	Year	Album
"Fly"	2023	The Endless Coloured Ways: The Songs of Nick Drake

== See also ==
- List of Old Abingdonians
