= 7 Worlds Collide =

Musical project by Neill Finn

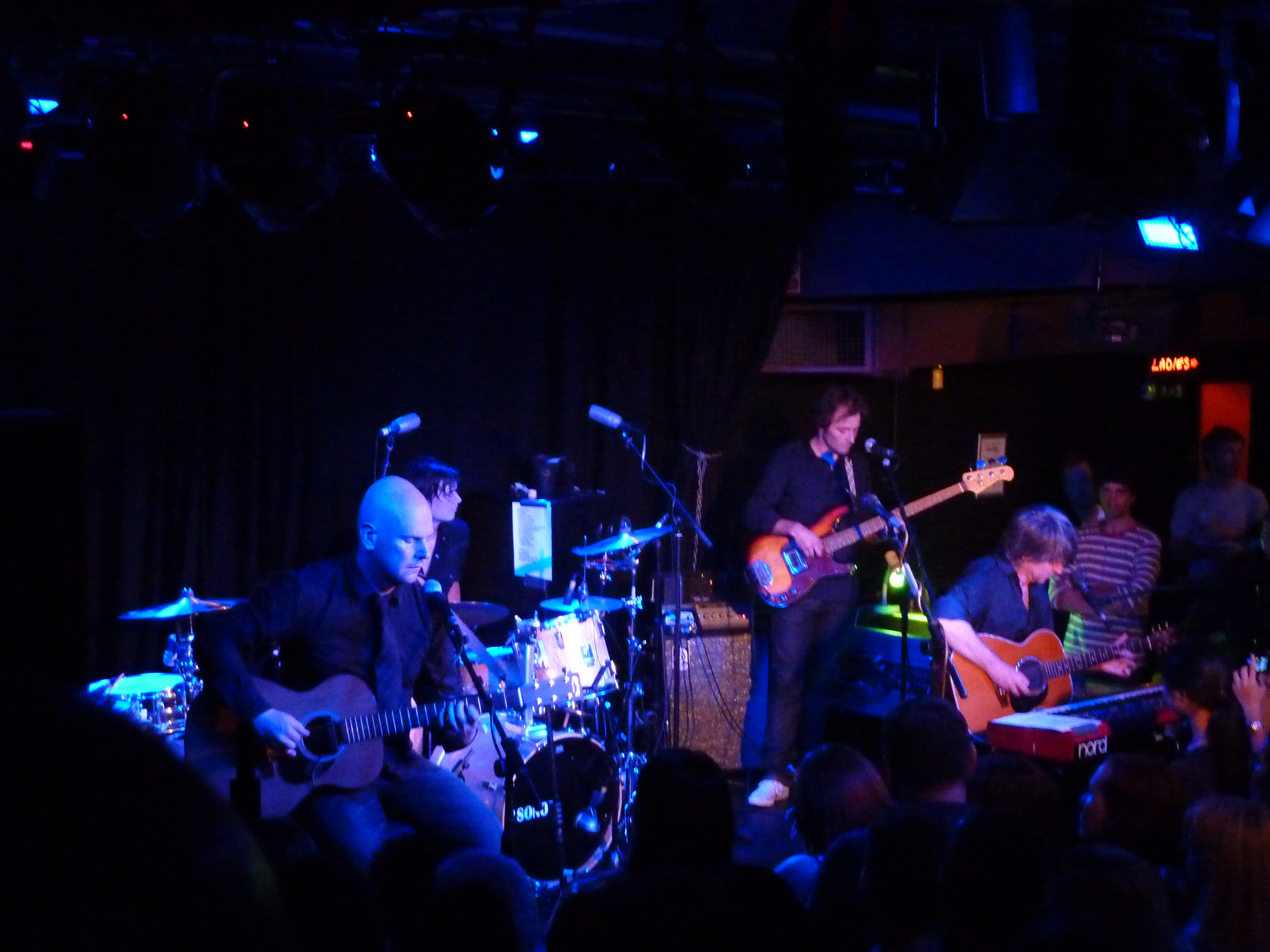
7 Worlds Collide in August 2009

7 Worlds Collide is a musical project by the New Zealand singer-songwriter Neil Finn. The project brings together Finn and other musicians in support of charity.

Finn has released two recordings associated with the project. The initial project release was a 2001 live album, credited to "Neil Finn and Friends", and titled 7 Worlds Collide. A second recording, titled The Sun Came Out, was released in August 2009.

The title of the project is derived from the line "Seven worlds will collide / whenever I am by your side" from Crowded House's 1993 single "Distant Sun".

== 2001 live release ==
The first 7 Worlds Collide album, 7 Worlds Collide, was released on 26 November 2001 and is a live recording culled from a series of five shows recorded at the St James theatre in Auckland, New Zealand, from 2 April 2001 to 6 April 2001. The album was released under the credit "Neil Finn & Friends"; notable guests in Finn's band included Eddie Vedder, Johnny Marr, Ed O'Brien, Tim Finn, Sebastian Steinberg, Phil Selway, Lisa Germano, and Betchadupa (featuring Neil's son Liam Finn).

== 2008-2009 follow up ==
In December 2008, the 7 Worlds Collide lineup reconvened in Auckland, New Zealand to record a studio charity album for Oxfam. The album was recorded in Finn's Roundhead Studios over three weeks and featured all-new material, with singing and songwriting contributions divided amongst the group. Most of the original participants returned, along with several new additions including Jeff Tweedy, Glenn Kotche, John Stirratt and Pat Sansone of Wilco, Scottish singer-songwriter KT Tunstall, New Zealand songwriters Don McGlashan and Bic Runga, and Finn's son Elroy Finn.

While recording the album, the ensemble played three sold-out shows in early January 2009 at the Powerstation concert venue in Auckland.

The album, titled The Sun Came Out, was released on 31 August 2009. A documentary film about the three weeks of recording and live shows, also titled The Sun Came Out, was released in 2010. A concert video compiled from the three concerts, 7 Worlds Collide – Live at the Powerstation, was released in February 2019.

== Discography ==
- 7 Worlds Collide (2001)
- The Sun Came Out (2009)
