= 23 Envelope =

Graphic design partnership

- Founded: 1980
- Founders: Vaughan Oliver; Nigel Grierson
- Dissolved: 1988
- Type: Graphic design partnership
- Location: United Kingdom
- Key people: Vaughan Oliver (graphic designer); Nigel Grierson (photographer/filmmaker)

23 Envelope was the name given to the graphic design partnership of graphic designer Vaughan Oliver and photographer/filmmaker Nigel Grierson from 1980–1988. During this time, they created a distinct visual identity for the British independent music label 4AD through their record sleeve designs for bands such as Cocteau Twins, Dead Can Dance, and This Mortal Coil.

As 23 Envelope, Oliver primarily designed, while Grierson primarily photographed (occasionally, however, duties would be exchanged and/or overlap). With Grierson's departure in 1988, Oliver saw fit to retire the 23 Envelope moniker, and continue working under the name v23 with new partner Chris Bigg, and various design associates that would come to include Paul McMenamin, Timothy O'Donnell, Martin Andersen and others. Meanwhile, Grierson focused more on the moving image, directing music videos and TV commercials, both in London and the USA.

A quote from a 2000 article on Grierson by Rick Poynor explains some of the early history of Oliver and Grierson:

Oliver and Grierson met in their late teens, as school boys, at Ferryhill Comprehensive, County Durham. Their friendship began in the art room, chatting about their mutual passions for art and rock music. For both of them, designing album covers — the medium was then still a twelve-inch mini-canvas — was a natural ambition. "Record sleeves," says Grierson, "seemed like the greatest thing you could possibly do." In 1976, Oliver began a graphic design degree at Newcastle Polytechnic and, a year later, at Oliver's suggestion — as Grierson recalls it — his friend decided to join him. Both came under the spell of Terry Dowling, a Royal College of Art illustration graduate, who ran the second-year design course. They still speak of him as their mentor.

== Publications featuring the work of 23 Envelope ==
The work of 23 Envelope has been well-published in books and design magazines especially under Vaughan Oliver's name.

- Vanderlans, Rudy, ed. (1988). Emigre, No. 9.
- Poynor, Rick, ed. (1993). Eye, No. 10, Vol. 3. Wordsearch Ltd.
- Walters, John L., ed. (2000). Eye, No. 37, Vol. 10. Quantum Publishing.
- Oliver, Vaughan; O'Reighan, Vulva (1994). This Rimy River: Vaughn Oliver and Graphic Works 1988–94. ISBN 978-0-9524216-0-3.
- Poynor, Rick (2000). Vaughan Oliver: Visceral Pleasure. ISBN 978-1-86154-072-0.
- 23 Envelope Presents (Television documentary). BBC.
- Grierson, Nigel (2014). Photographs. Dewi Lewis Publishing. ISBN 978-1-907893-64-3.
- Grierson, Nigel (2020). Passing Through. Lost Press. ISBN 978-1-9162373-0-8.
- Grierson, Nigel (2020). Lightstream. Lost Press. ISBN 978-1-9162373-1-5.
