= Lisa Germano =

American singer-songwriter (born 1958)

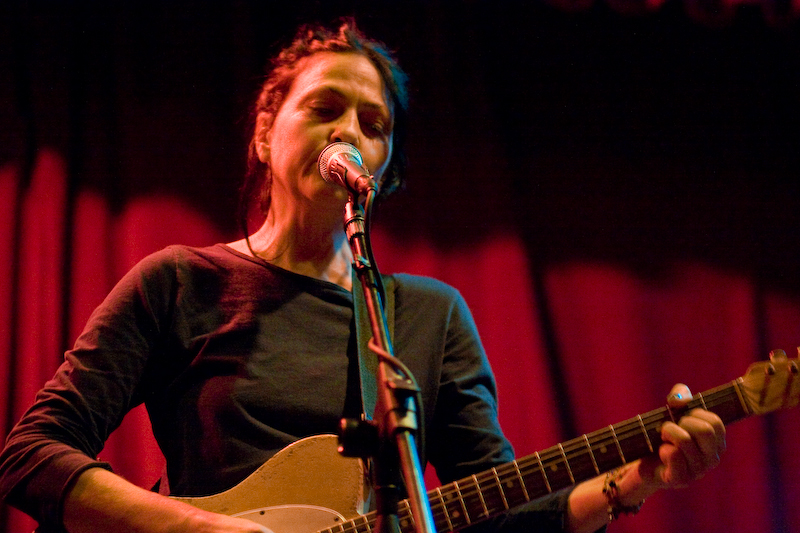
- Lisa Germano performing, December 2007

Background information
- Born: Lisa Ruth Germano; June 27, 1958 (age 68); Mishawaka, Indiana, U.S.
- Genres: Alternative rock; dream pop; folk rock; lo-fi (early)
- Occupations: Musician; singer; songwriter; graphic artist
- Instruments: Violin; guitar; accordion; piano; vocals
- Labels: Major Bill; Capitol; 4AD; Warner Bros.; Ineffable; Young God

Lisa Ruth Germano (born June 27, 1958) is an American singer-songwriter and multi-instrumentalist from Indiana.

Germano's career began as a violinist for John Mellencamp. Her breakthrough album Geek the Girl (1994) was named one of the best albums of the 1990s by Spin magazine. As of 2025, she has released thirteen albums.

AllMusic described her sound as "dreamy" and "quirky". Her style draws from folk rock and poetry. Examples of topics explored in her songs include self-concept, coming of age, social issues, disgust and ignorance.

== Early life ==
Germano was born in Mishawaka, Indiana, one of six children of violinist Rocco and Betty Germano. She studied music, including piano and violin, as a child. When she was seven, she composed a 15-minute opera for piano accompaniment.

== Career ==
Germano studied at Indiana University in Bloomington in the late 1970s and played in local bands, where she became acquainted with drummer Kenny Aronoff. In 1985, based upon Aronoff's recommendation, rock singer John Mellencamp invited her to play in his band for the Scarecrow Tour. For the next eight years, she toured and recorded as a member of Mellencamp's band, appearing on The Lonesome Jubilee (1987), Big Daddy (1989), Falling from Grace (1991), Human Wheels (1993), and Dance Naked (1994). Germano played with Mellencamp from 1985 to 1993 before leaving in 1994 to pursue a solo career. During the 1980s she also appeared on albums by Simple Minds and the Indigo Girls. Germano rejoined Mellencamp's band for the 2023 Live and In Person tour, and also played violin on his studio album that year, Orpheus Descending – the first Mellencamp studio album she played on since 1993.

After recording with Henry Lee Summer, Bob Seger, and Carrie Newcomer, Germano began a solo career with the album On the Way Down from the Moon Palace (1991), recorded in Indianapolis and released by her label, Major Bill Records. Although sales were low, the album got the attention of Capitol Records, which signed her to a contract and released her next album, Happiness (1993). Personnel changes at Capitol resulted in the departure of most of her supporters at the label, but Germano retained the rights to her album.

Germano signed a contract with the British label 4AD, which had a manufacturing and distribution deal with Warner Bros. in the U.S. Ivo Watts-Russell, founder and president of 4AD, was a fan of Germano's work. He remixed some of the Happiness tracks with producer and engineer John Fryer, who had been involved in Watts-Russell's This Mortal Coil project. In early 1994, 4AD issued Inconsiderate Bitch, a limited-edition EP with five of the remixed tracks. In April of that year, Happiness was reissued with different artwork, mixing, and sequencing. Two tracks from the original release were replaced, including a cover version of "These Boots Are Made for Walkin'".

Germano's third album, Geek the Girl, was released in October 1994. It received positive reviews from the music press and significantly raised her profile. Most of its tracks were recorded at her home, giving the album an intimate and demo-like feel. Initially, she played all of the instruments on the record, but she then chose to re-mix four of the tracks with the help of Malcolm Burn, and added Kenny Aronoff on drums.

Excerpts From a Love Circus (1996) was critically acclaimed. Earlier that year, Watts-Russell approached 4AD's musicians with the idea that each act would find another person or band to collaborate with on three songs. The recordings would then be released by the label as a monthly series of EPs. Germano worked with rock band Giant Sand, but after their tracks had been recorded, the label decided that the series would be unfeasible and scrapped the idea. Germano and the members of Giant Sand liked the results and enjoyed collaborating, and despite the labels' lack of interest in their recordings, recorded a full album in less than a week. Managers for Germano and Giant Sand made a deal with Thirsty Ear Recordings to release the album as a one-off project under the name OP8, and the album Slush was released in February 1997. In April 1997, 4AD began to promote the single "I Love a Snot" (remixed by Tchad Blake) to radio and retail stores in America, but sales of the Excerpts from a Love Circus album remained static at best. "Lovesick", another track from the album, was remixed by Trevor Jackson (as The Underdog) and released by his label, Output Recordings.

Sales began to sag noticeably after the July 1998 release of the album Slide, produced by Tchad Blake. The distribution deal with Warner Bros. ended, returning 4AD to independent status; and without Warner's involvement Slide received less of a promotional effort. Before the album's release, Germano was invited to sing backup vocals on tour with The Smashing Pumpkins. Although she rejected the offer at first, singer Billy Corgan persuaded her that she would have a more collaborative role, and she agreed to join the tour. She rehearsed with the band for four weeks in Chicago. The night before the tour was supposed to begin, Corgan dismissed her (via the tour manager) with no explanation.

Intent on resuming the promotion of Slide, she went on tour, opening for the Eels and then headlining smaller clubs. While on tour she was notified by 4AD that they were dropping her from the label. By the end of 1998, she announced that she was done with the music business. She fired her management. Nonetheless, in 1999 she performed in Toronto at Lee's Palace, and continued to release new albums with various labels.

== Discography ==
=== Albums ===
- On the Way Down from the Moon Palace (Major Bill, 1991)
- Happiness (Capitol, 1993/4AD, 1994)
- Geek the Girl (4AD, 1994)
- Excerpts from a Love Circus (4AD, 1996)
- Slush (Thirsty Ear, 1997) (with OP8)
- Slide (4AD, 1998)
- Lullaby for Liquid Pig (Ineffable/ARTISTdirect, 2003)
- In the Maybe World (Young God, 2006)
- Magic Neighbor (Young God, 2009)
- No Elephants (Badman, 2013)

=== Compilations ===
- Concentrated (self-released, 2002)
- Rare, Unusual or Just Bad Songs (self-released, 2002)
- Songs From Tierra Sabrosa (self-released, 2006)
- Lisa Germano (self-released, 2006)

=== As guest ===
With David Bowie

- 2002 Heathen
- 2002 "Slow Burn"

With Michael Brook

- 2006 RockPaperScissors
- 2007 BellCurve

With Eels

- 1998 Electro-Shock Blues
- 2000 Oh What a Beautiful Morning
- 2003 Shootenanny!

With Neil Finn

- 1998 Try Whistling This
- 2001 One Nil
- 2002 7 Worlds Collide

With Howe Gelb

- 1998 Hisser
- 2013 Little Sand Box

With Indigo Girls

- 1992 Rites of Passage
- 1994 Swamp Ophelia
- 1997 Shaming of the Sun

With Billy Joel

- 1990 Live at Yankee Stadium, violin on "The Downeaster 'Alexa' "

With John Mellencamp

- 1987 The Lonesome Jubilee
- 1989 Big Daddy
- 1993 Human Wheels
- 1994 Dance Naked
- 1998 John Mellencamp
- 2010 On the Rural Route 7609
- 2018 Other People's Stuff
- 2023 Orpheus Descending (album)

With Simple Minds

- 1987 Live in the City of Light
- 1989 Street Fighting Years
- 1991 Real Life

With Yann Tiersen

- 2001 L' Absente
- 2003 C'était Ici
- 2008 C'était Ici: Live

With others

- 1987 The Sound of Music, The dB's
- 1988 Rebels Without a Clue, The Bellamy Brothers
- 1989 I've Got Everything, Henry Lee Summer
- 1991 The Fire Inside, Bob Seger
- 1991 Visions and Dreams, Carrie Newcomer
- 1991 World So Bright, Adam Schmitt
- 1992 Candyland, James McMurtry
- 1993 American Caesar, Iggy Pop
- 1993 Strays, Junkhouse
- 1995 Glum, Giant Sand
- 1996 Caledonia, John P. Strohm
- 1996 Dead Spy Report, Craig Ross
- 1996 In Flight, Linda Perry
- 1997 Time and Love: The Music of Laura Nyro, various artists (Germano contributed a version of "Eli's Comin'")
- 1998 Dopamine, Mitchell Froom
- 1998 The Globe Sessions, Sheryl Crow
- 2001 Las Vegas Is Cursed, Hector Zazou
- 2002 Anna, Anna Waronker
- 2003 0304, Jewel
- 2003 From Every Sphere, Ed Harcourt
- 2003 The Official Fiction, Something for Kate
- 2003 True Reflections, Boyd Tinsley
- 2004 Impossible Dream, Patty Griffin
- 2005 The Roads Don't Love You, Gemma Hayes
- 2009 Amor Vincit Omnia, Draco Rosa
- 2009 Devil's Halo, Meshell Ndegeocello
- 2009 Goodnight Unknown, Lou Barlow
- 2009 The Sun Came Out, 7 Worlds Collide
- 2010 Intriguer, Crowded House
