= Marion (band) =

English rock band

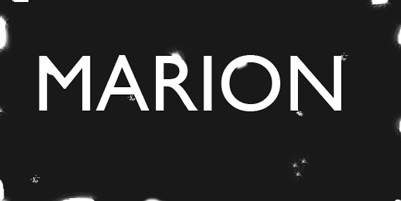
- Band logo

Background information
- Origin: Macclesfield, England
- Genres: Britpop; alternative rock
- Years active: 1993–99, 2006–08, 2011–12, 2014–present
- Labels: Rough Trade, London, Marion Recordings (Townsend)
- Members: Jaime Harding (vocals); Andrew Tarling; Andy McKerlie; Blair Murray (drums)
- Past members: Tony Grantham (guitar); Phil Cunningham (guitar); Jake Evans (guitar); Murad Mousa (drums); Damian Lawrence; Julian Phillips (bass); Nick Gilbert (bass); Katie Ware; Rebecca 'Reb' Fitzpatrick; Jack Mitchell (drums); Che Hargreaves (bass); Johnny Regan; Wayne Ward; Nick McCall; Edward Roberts
- Website: www.marionthegroup.com

Marion are an English Britpop band, formed in 1993 in Macclesfield, Cheshire. The band's classic lineup featured frontman Jaime Harding (born Jamie Brian Harding, 27 February 1975), guitarist Phil Cunningham, guitarist Tony Grantham (born Anthony Paul Grantham), bassist Julian Phillips and drummer Murad Mousa.

The band released two studio albums before splitting up in 1999, due to Harding's heroin addiction which saw him not rehearsing with the band that year. Although originally lumped in with the "Madchester" scene they were later seen more as a northern version of Suede and the band felt that this latter label held them back.

In 2006, Harding and Cunningham recruited a new set of musicians and reformed the band. They started working on new material, having played their first live gig together as Marion in seven years on 1 April 2006 in Bath. They followed this up with sold-out shows in Manchester and London in September 2006.

The original lineup of the band reformed, minus drummer Murad Mousa who was replaced by Jack Mitchell, in September 2011. In mid 2015, it was revealed that Harding was continuing with the band, with himself as the sole original member involved.

== Biography ==
=== Formation – split (1993–99) ===
The band were formed in Macclesfield, Cheshire in 1993 by Ryles Park High School students Jaime Harding and Anthony Grantham, and Sutton resident Phil Cunningham who had previously been in various bands together including Cloud, Chief, Push The King and The Shags. After recruiting bassist Damian Lawrence and drummer Murad Mousa, they recorded a demo that was sent to former Smiths manager Joe Moss who agreed to manage the band. Moss, who at the time promoted shows at The Night and Day Café in Manchester's Northern Quarter, allowed the band to rehearse in the cafe's basement. The band replaced bassist Damian Lawrence with Julian Phillips and rehearsed six days a week for nine months, commuting each day from Macclesfield, before playing in London to try and gain record company attention.

After releasing debut single 'Violent Men' on Rough Trade Records, a bidding war began between the major record labels, with Marion eventually signing to London Records and a publishing deal with Island Music Publishing in October 1994. In March 1995, bassist Julian Phillips left the band to join Electrafixion & work with Ian McCulloch so was replaced by Nick Gilbert formerly of the Hot Bananas who featured on all other Marion recordings.

The band released debut This World & Body in February 1996, which entered the UK Top 10 Album Chart. Constant gigging saw the band supporting the likes of Morrissey, Radiohead, Ian McCulloch of Echo & The Bunnymen and Manic Street Preachers. The band played at Glastonbury Festival 3 times and other festivals across the UK and Europe, also undertaking 2 tours of Japan and 4 short tours of America. The band also appeared on TV on the likes of the BBC special 'Britpop Now' BBC television special, The Beat and The Word.

After a gruelling 18 month international touring campaign for the album, the band found it difficult to write a second album. Moss brought in Johnny Marr to co-write and produce second album The Program. The album was released in September 1998, however Harding's heroin habit saw him become increasingly unreliable which led to a lack of promotion. Harding later admitted that "I'd always used speed and cocaine but the heroin really took hold round the making of The Program".

The band split up the following year following a mammoth tour of the US, which saw Harding increasingly withdrawn from the rest of the band. Cunningham stated that the band split up due to frustration and bitterness creeping in as no one was able to get through to Harding.

=== Post-split (2000–05) ===
Guitarist Phil Cunningham toured with Bernard Sumner's and Johnny Marr's band Electronic, and subsequently went on to become a full-time member of Bad Lieutenant and New Order, co-writing material.

Second guitarist Tony Grantham, who left the band in 1998, formed Chalk and Ryna.

Bassist Nick Gilbert was deeply affected by the break up. He sold his equipment and started working in graphic design.

Drummer Murad Mousa fell into substance abuse, was hospitalised several times and almost jailed for grievous bodily harm. He got clean after attending the Priory Hospital in 2004. In 2006, he said he does not miss being in a band. He works as a support officer at the hospital and also works in property.

In December 1999, it was revealed the frontman Jaime Harding was working with longtime friend Wayne Ward on new material. Although all the band's music had been written by Cunningham and Grantham, the new material was to be released under the Marion name, with Harding stating that "the name Marion belongs to me and only I use it". He described the material as being "more mature and less in a panic, yet I would say more powerful than previous songs". In June 2000, Harding pleaded guilty to theft charges and possession of heroin and was put on probation for six months. He had stolen garden ornaments and sold them to an antiques dealer to fund his heroin habit. The duo reportedly continued to work through to 2005, until Harding went to Eastern Europe for a year to try and get clean. Nothing from the sessions was ever released, with Harding later commenting that the material "wasn't something that when I played it I felt comfortable about".

=== Attempted reformations (2006–present) ===
In 2006, Harding and Cunningham reformed the band with additional guitarist Jake Evans, bassist Che Hargreaves and former Haven drummer Jack Mitchell. They began working on new material, and played their first live gig together as Marion in seven years on 1 April 2006 in Bath. Further sold-out shows were played in Manchester and London in September and December 2006, with half of the sets made up of new material. Cunningham stated that they were to only use the band name for initial gigs, and that they would continue working under a different name as the rest of the original band were not available. However, in early 2007 Harding was hospitalised after being diagnosed with infective endocarditis, caused by injecting heroin with a dirty or contaminated needle. Admitting that he "blew one of my heart valves from injecting heroin and crack", Harding underwent open-heart surgery and had to have a metal valve placed in his heart. A handful of gigs were booked in 2008, but again cancelled after Harding contracted pneumonia.

In late 2011, the original line up of the band reformed, minus drummer Murad Mousa who was replaced by Jack Mitchell. The band played a handful of shows, with a live album recorded at Manchester Club Academy, entitled 'Alive In Manchester' released. The reformation ended in 2012, with a planned studio album abandoned. A solo tour of Italy planned for 2013 was cancelled after Harding was hospitalised suffering chest pains.

In 2014, it was confirmed that whilst Harding was still not clean from drugs he was now being managed by Joe Moss again. In mid 2015, it was announced that Harding was to continue working under the Marion name with a new lineup leaving him as the only original member. The lineup featured former Twisted Wheel drummer Blair Murray. Moss died in October 2015.

In September 2015, it was announced that the current lineup of the band would perform in London in March 2016 to mark the 20th anniversary of the release of the band's debut album This World and Body. However, the gig was rescheduled after Harding was incarcerated at HM Prison Forest Bank in Pendlebury, Salford for an unknown offence. On 3 March 2016, Harding revealed on social media that he had just been released. In May 2016, an expanded set of gigs including the rescheduled London gig was announced for September/October/November. In June 2016 Harding revealed that he was attending Narcotics Anonymous.

On 11 August 2016, it was announced that Harding had been incarcerated at Strangeways Prison, Manchester for drugs offenses. All planned live shows for the year were cancelled as his case would not be heard until December. However, the following day it was revealed in the press that Harding had actually been sentenced at Manchester Minshull Street Crown Court for two years and eight months for arson. In February 2016, he had set fire to two of his girlfriend's dresses with a cigarette lighter after she failed to answer his phone calls. His management claimed that Harding "was in the midst of a deep depression and also under the influence of various substances".

In late 2016 the band's two studio albums were reissued by Demon Music Group. The 20th anniversary edition of the band's debut album, This World and Body, was released as an expanded three CD set and vinyl LP. The sophomore album, The Program, was reissued as a two CD set. In November 2018, Harding was fined and banned from driving for 12 months after admitting to driving under the influence of drugs.

In a 2023 interview with Music News, Harding said he would like to get back into performing and recording music.

== Discography ==
=== Studio albums ===
Title	Details	Peak chart positions
Title	Details	UK
This World and Body	Released: 1996; Label: London Records	10
The Program	Released: 1998; Label: London Records	—

=== Live albums ===
Title	Details	Peak chart positions
Title	Details	UK
Alive In Manchester	Released: 16 April 2012; Label: Marion Recordings	—

=== Singles ===
Title	Details	Peak chart positions	Album
Title	Details	UK	Album
"Violent Men"	Released: June 1994; Label: Rough Trade Records	163	non-album single
"Sleep"	Released: 13 February 1995; Label: London Records	53	This World and Body
"Toys for Boys"	Released: 1 May 1995; Label: London Records	57	This World and Body
"Let's All Go Together"	Released: 9 October 1995; Label: London Records	37	This World and Body
"Time"	Released: 22 January 1996; Label: London Records	29	This World and Body
"Sleep" (remix)	Released: 18 March 1996; Label: London Records	17	This World and Body
"Miyako Hideaway"	Released: 23 February 1998; Label: London Records	45	The Program
"Sparkle" (promo only)	Released: 1998; Label: London Records, Motor Music	—	The Program

=== Extended plays ===
Title	Details
Toys For Boys EP	Released: 25 July 1995 (Japan); Label: London Records
The Sleep EP	Released: 20 April 1996 (Japan); Label: London Records
Sparkle EP	Released: 1 June 1998 (Japan); Label: London Records
Live In The Studio Sessions EP	Released: 21 April 2008; Label: Townsend Records
Can't Stop Now EP	Released: April 2016; Label: Marion Recordings
Rouge Male EP	Released: May 2016; Label: Marion Recordings
