= The Age of Everything =

Studio album by Johnny Marr
- Released: 2 October 2026
- Recorded: 2025–26
- Length: 43:59
- Labels: New Voodoo; BMG
- Producers: James Doviak; Johnny Marr

Johnny Marr chronology
Look Out Live! (2025)	The Age of Everything (2026)

Singles from The Age of Everything
- 1. "Spin" Released: 16 June 2026; 2. "Ophelia" Released: 24 July 2026; 3. "It's Time" Released: 25 August 2026

The Age of Everything is the fifth studio album by Johnny Marr. It was released on 2 October 2026 through New Voodoo, under license to BMG. It is supported by the singles "Spin", "Ophelia", and "It's Time".

== Critical reception ==
Any Decent Music gave the album a weighted average score of 7.1 out of 10 from eleven critic scores. According to Metacritic, it received "universal acclaim" based on a weighted average score of 81 out of 100 from seven critic scores.

== Track listing ==
All tracks are written by Johnny Marr and James Doviak.

The Age of Everything track listing
No.	Title	Length
1.	"Spin"	3:50
2.	"Beyond the Rain"	4:00
3.	"It's Time"	4:07
4.	"How Come"	3:59
5.	"Ophelia"	3:58
6.	"That Feeling"	4:25
7.	"In and Out of Love"	4:45
8.	"Just Once More"	5:03
9.	"Fire with Fire"	4:22
10.	"All in a Life"	5:30
Total length:		43:59

== Personnel ==
Credits are adapted from Tidal.

- Johnny Marr – vocals, guitars, keyboards, production
- James Doviak – background vocals, guitars, keyboards, production, engineering
- Iwan Gronow – background vocals, bass guitar
- Meredith Sheldon – background vocals
- Nile Marr – background vocals
- Jack Mitchell – drums
- Claudius Mittendorfer – mixing
- Frank Arkwright – mastering

== Charts ==
Chart performance for The Age of Everything
Chart (2026)	Peak position
Belgian Albums (Ultratop Flanders)	46
Belgian Albums (Ultratop Wallonia)	55
French Physical Albums (SNEP)	62
French Rock & Metal Albums (SNEP)	19
Irish Independent Albums (IRMA)	15
Scottish Albums (Official Charts)	3
UK Albums (Official Charts)	5
UK Independent Albums (Official Charts)	2
