= Adrenalin Baby =

Live album by Johnny Marr
- Released: 9 October 2015
- Recorded: 2014
- Length: 77:37
- Labels: New Voodoo; Warner Bros.
- Producers: Johnny Marr; James Doviak

Johnny Marr chronology
Playland (2014)	Adrenalin Baby (2015)	Call the Comet (2018)

Adrenalin Baby is a live album by musician Johnny Marr. It was released on 9 October 2015 by New Voodoo Records. The album was recorded at the Manchester Apollo, Glasgow Academy and Brixton Academy shows. It peaked at number 96 in the UK Albums Chart.

== Background ==
Adrenalin Baby was recorded live during the Playland tour in 2014. The Playland tour was extensive and included, among others, dates in the United States, England, the Netherlands, Germany and France. Of Adrenalin Baby, Marr said that he had "wanted to capture the atmosphere and feeling of the last couple of tours". The album features live versions of tracks from both Marr's solo records Playland, The Messenger, and renditions of songs from earlier on in his career, such as "Getting Away With It", which he released with New Order’s Bernard Sumner as Electronic. Adrenalin Baby also features The Smiths songs "The Headmaster Ritual", "Bigmouth Strikes Again", "There Is a Light That Never Goes Out" and "How Soon Is Now?"

== Critical reception ==
Adrenalin Baby received positive reviews from different music critics. NME said Marr "proves his greatness on a spiky live album" and at Metacritic, which assigns a rating out of 100 to reviews from critics, the album scored an average rating of 73.

== Track listing ==
All tracks are written by Johnny Marr except track 6, 10, 14, 17 Morrissey/Marr, track 13 by Bernard Sumner/Marr/Neil Tennant and track 16 by Sonny Curtis.

No.	Title	Length
1.	"Playland"	6:13
2.	"The Right Thing Right"	3:59
3.	"Easy Money"	4:07
4.	"25 Hours"	4:01
5.	"New Town Velocity"	5:34
6.	"The Headmaster Ritual"	4:44
7.	"The Messenger"	4:42
8.	"Back in the Box"	3:23
9.	"Generate! Generate!"	4:40
10.	"Bigmouth Strikes Again"	3:20
11.	"Boys Get Straight"	2:51
12.	"Candidate"	4:42
13.	"Getting Away with It"	7:03
14.	"There Is a Light That Never Goes Out"	5:53
15.	"Dynamo"	4:11
16.	"I Fought the Law"	2:44
17.	"How Soon Is Now?"	5:30
Total length:		1:17:37

== Personnel ==
Credits are adapted from liner notes of Adrenalin baby.

Musicians

- Johnny Marr – vocals, guitars, production
- James Doviak – keyboards, guitars, backing vocals, production
- Iwan Gronow – bass, backing vocals
- Jack Mitchell – drums

Additional personnel

- Johnny Marr and Doviak – mixing
- Frank Arkwright – mastering
- Joe Moss – management
- Dave Cronen – management

Artwork personnel

- Nile Marr – cover shot
- Mat Bancroft and Laura Turner – layout
- Pat Graham, Elspeth Moore and Ian Thriller – Photography
