= Fever Dreams Pts 1–4 =

Studio album by Johnny Marr
- Released: 25 February 2022
- Studio: Crazy Face Factory
- Length: 73:33
- Labels: New Voodoo; BMGx
- Producers: Johnny Marr; James Doviak

Johnny Marr chronology
Call the Comet (2018)	Fever Dreams Pts 1–4 (2022)	Spirit Power: The Best of Johnny Marr (2023)

Fever Dreams Pts 1–4 is the fourth studio album by musician Johnny Marr. Its first two parts were released as EPs in late 2021, with the album being released in full on 25 February 2022 through New Voodoo, under license to BMG. The third part was later issued separately on vinyl. The album is Marr's first double album and peaked at number 4, the highest chart position for his solo albums.

== Writing and recording ==
The album was recorded during a lockdown period. Speaking of the album, Marr said: "There's a set of influences and a very broad sound that I've been developing – really since getting out of The Smiths until now, and I hear it in this record. There are so many strands of music in it. We didn't do that consciously, but I think I've got a vocabulary of sound. And I feel very satisfied that I've been able to harness it. It's an inspired record, and I couldn't wait to get in and record every day. But I had to go inwards."

The track "Receiver" is "erotic signals that we send to each other".

Talking to NME, Marr said of the track "Ariel", which is based on Sylvia Plath's poem "Ariel": "With a song like 'Ariel', I just felt like I wanted to sing something to do with empathy." Speaking of "Lightning People", Marr said: "I wanted to pay tribute, in a way, to people who are interested in me, and listen to me. Even if it's just for the five minutes of people listening to the song, to galvanize this idea of 'us'."

Marr said "Sensory Street" is a "story of a surreal 48 hours in subterranean England", and spoke about "Tenement Time" as "about running around Ardwick [Manchester, England], bunking into warehouses and getting chased. That was the first time I was self-consciously into culture: around people who wore certain clothes, and it was part of being a little Manchester boy, really. I have a real romanticism about that period of my life."

Speaking of "Night and Day", Marr said: "I need songs after all the news, news, news. It gets too real in the hotspots, I'm trying to be positive, for me and my audience, really. My personality is such that it occurs to me to think that way. I'm not just writing with positivity for the sake of a song. It's real, and it's also very necessary."

== Critical reception ==
The album received relatively positive reviews from most outlets. On Metacritic, the album earned an 82 out of 100, based on 12 critic scores, indicating "universal acclaim". Writing for God Is in the TV, Laura Dean gave the album 4.5 out of 5 stars, saying that it "illustrates Johnny's versatility and talents for song writing, production and vocals". Emma Harrison from Clash gave the album 8 out of 10, stating the album not only showcases Johnny Marr's ability as a guitarist but also as a songwriter to "craft a series of strong tracks".

Mojo gave the album 4 out of 5 stars, stating that "Fever Dreams is too long, uniform and persistent to enjoy in one sitting." Mark Beaumont, writing for The Independent, gave the album a 4 out of 5 as well, stating "Like the post-pandemic age, you never know what's coming next."

NME gave the album a 4 out of 5, with writer Andrew Trendell saying "It's Marr's restlessly prolific spirit that drives Fever Dreams Pt 1–4 [...] This album is the work of a man with no time for big cash reunions or the squabbling that prevents them. Instead, he has turned in a record fuelled by soul and new ideas."

Craig Mathieson of The Sydney Morning Herald gave the album 4 out of 5 stars, concluding that "Most of music's greats eventually flounder, but Marr remains purposeful".

Felix Rowe of DIY gave the album a mixed rating of 6 out of 10, saying the album "shines brightest when Marr lets his guitar do the talking".

== Singles ==
"Spirit Power and Soul" was the lead single for the album, released on 31 August 2021. It was number 38 on the list of the best selling vinyl singles of 2021. It features on Fever Dreams Pt1 EP as lead track and there is also a Vince Clark remix of the track available.

"Tenement Time" was the second single, released on 8 November 2021, with the B-side "Sensory Street". Both tracks feature on Fever Dreams Pt 2 EP which includes lead track, "Lightning People".

"Night and Day" was released as the third single, with a single version that is 3 minutes and 41 seconds long, compared to the album version, which is 4 minutes and 54 seconds long. The edited version features on Fever Dreams Pt 3 EP which includes lead track, "The Speed of Love".

Videos were made for all three songs. A lyric video for "Sensory Street" is available.

== Live performance at the Crazy Face Factory ==
Alongside the announcement for the album on 12 October 2021, Marr also announced a livestream named Liveat the Crazy Face Factory, which was to premiere online from 10 November until 14 November. Fans who had pre-ordered the album from the store were able to access exclusive tickets to the show before the public sale began on 20 October.

Filmed at Crazy Face Factory, the show allowed fans "the chance to step inside [Marr's] custom-built Crazy Face Factory studio where Fever Dreams Pts 1–4 was created" and Marr also "discuss[ed] his creative process and life in songwriting, alongside a set of full-band live performances from across his career".

The Yorkshire Post reviewed the show, giving the explanation Marr stated for the name of the studio: "Marr reveals that the connection between the Crazy Face Factory's name and the late Joe Moss, The Smiths' first manager, who also owned the Crazy Face street clothing line. 'It's partly a tribute to Joe and partly a tribute to my past.'"

== Track listing ==
All tracks are written by Johnny Marr and Doviak.

Fever Dreams track listing
No.	Title	Length
1.	"Spirit Power and Soul"	4:18
2.	"Receiver"	5:18
3.	"All These Days"	4:55
4.	"Ariel"	4:51
5.	"Lightning People"	4:39
6.	"Hideaway Girl"	3:25
7.	"Sensory Street"	5:18
8.	"Tenement Time"	4:18
9.	"The Speed of Love"	5:44
10.	"Night and Day"	4:54
11.	"Counter Clock World"	4:06
12.	"Rubicon"	4:14
13.	"God's Gift"	4:06
14.	"Ghoster"	4:10
15.	"The Whirl"	3:44
16.	"Human"	4:22
Total length:		73:33

== Personnel ==
Band

- Johnny Marr – vocals, guitar, keyboards
- James Doviak – guitars, keyboards, vocals
- Iwan Gronow – bass guitar, vocals
- Jack Mitchell – drums

Additional personnel

- Simone Marie – bass guitar on tracks 1, 5, 10
- Meredith Sheldon – backing vocals on tracks 1, 2, 5, 6, 9, 10, 12, 14
- Nile Marr – backing vocals on "Hideaway Girl"
- Claudius Mittendorfer – mixing
- Russ Millar – recording assistant
- Mat Bancroft & Laura Turner – design and artwork
- Niall Lea – photography

== Charts ==
Chart performance for Fever Dreams
Chart (2022)	Peak position
Belgian Albums (Ultratop Flanders)	82
Belgian Albums (Ultratop Wallonia)	30
German Albums (Offizielle Top 100)	24
Irish Albums (IRMA)	58
Scottish Albums (Official Charts)	2
Swiss Albums (Schweizer Hitparade)	82
UK Albums (Official Charts)	4
