= Call the Comet =

Studio album by Johnny Marr
- Released: 15 June 2018
- Recorded: 2017–2018
- Studio: The Crazy Face Factory, Manchester
- Genre: Indie rock
- Length: 57:53
- Label: New Voodoo; Warner Bros.
- Producer: Johnny Marr; James Doviak

Johnny Marr chronology
Adrenalin Baby (2015)	Call the Comet (2018)	Fever Dreams Pts 1–4 (2022)

Singles from Call the Comet
- 1. "Hi Hello" Released: 11 May 2018; 2. "Spiral Cities" Released: 9 November 2018

Call the Comet is the third studio album by musician Johnny Marr. It was released on 15 June 2018 by New Voodoo and Warner Bros. Records.

== Singles ==
"Hi Hello" was released as a 7" single, with the new B-side "Jeopardy". "Jeopardy" was also released on the Japanese edition of "Call the Comet" as a bonus track and is available digitally.

"Spiral Cities" was later also released as a single digitally and on 7", along with the new B-side "Spectral Eyes".

Videos were made for both singles as well as the album tracks "The Tracers" and "Walk Into the Sea".

== Critical reception ==
Professional ratings
Aggregate scores
Source	Rating
Metacritic	78/100
Review scores
Source	Rating
AllMusic	4/5 stars
The Guardian	4/5 stars
The Independent	4/5 stars
The Irish Times	3/5 stars
The Line of Best Fit	8/10
The Music	3.5/5 stars
NME	4/5 stars
The Observer	4/5 stars
Pitchfork	6.0/10
PopMatters	8/10 stars
The Times	4/5 stars

Call the Comet received generally positive reviews from music critics upon its release. At Metacritic, which assigns a rating out of 100 to reviews from critics, the album scored an average rating of 78, based on 16 reviews. Writing for the Associated Press, Mark Kennedy opined that it was "easily his best as a solo artist, deep and rich both musically and lyrically" before concluding, "So feel free to stay in bed, Morrissey. Marr is who we need now." Writing for Hot Press, Edwin McFee rated the album 8 out of 10. MusicOMH contributor Neil Dowden awarded the album 4 out of 5 stars, calling it Marr's "most ambitious and interesting work under his own name". Creative Loafing contributor Gabe Echazabal rated it 4.5 out of 5, writing, "Call the Comet is, simply put, Marr's strongest solo effort. It's a magnificent piece of work that serves as a true testament to the idea that Marr has plenty to offer musically at this stage of his career, and it clearly showcases his continued and ever-present vitality." Clash Music contributor Will Rosebury rated the album 7/10 and called it "easily Johnny Marr’s most confident solo album".

Robert Steiner of The Boston Globe, however, disagreed with those other critics, starting his review by writing that Marr's time with the Smiths cemented his legacy as one of rock's greatest sidemen, "[b]ut that's the key word: sidemen." He went on to write that Marr is at his best working with other creative minds and all he does as a solo artist is "produce groggy rehashes of old Brit-rock tropes he helped create three decades ago." He concluded his review by stating Call the Comet could be a passable album if it was the work of a young band rather than someone "who inspired guitarists in some of those bands to pick up their instruments in the first place."

Writing for Pitchfork, contributor Stephen Thomas Erlewine of AllMusic gave a more mixed rating of 6/10, writing that after spending "a quarter-century as a hired gun, roaming from project to project", Marr "is starting to slow down in his middle age".

== Track listing ==
All tracks are written by Johnny Marr.

Call the Comet track listing
No.	Title	Length
1.	"Rise"	5:03
2.	"The Tracers"	4:35
3.	"Hey Angel"	5:37
4.	"Hi Hello"	4:23
5.	"New Dominions"	4:24
6.	"Day In Day Out"	4:43
7.	"Walk Into the Sea"	6:02
8.	"Bug"	4:39
9.	"Actor Attractor"	5:36
10.	"Spiral Cities"	4:07
11.	"My Eternal"	3:16
12.	"A Different Gun"	5:28
Total length:		57:53

Japanese bonus track
No.	Title	Length
13.	"Jeopardy"	3:32
Total length:		61:30

== Personnel ==
Musicians

- Johnny Marr – vocals, guitars, keyboards
- James Doviak – keyboards, vocals
- Iwan Gronow – bass guitar, vocals
- Jack Mitchell – drums

Production and additional personnel

- Claudius Mittendorfer – mixing
- Frank Arkwright – mastering
- Sonny Marr – backing vocals on "Walk Into the Sea" and "Spiral Cities"
- Niall Lea – photo
- Mat Bancroft – artwork
- Laura Turner – artwork

== Charts ==
Chart performance for Call the Comet
Chart (2018)	Peak position
Australian Albums (ARIA)	83
Belgian Albums (Ultratop Flanders)	165
Belgian Albums (Ultratop Wallonia)	95
French Albums (SNEP)	175
German Albums (Offizielle Top 100)	58
Irish Albums (IRMA)	20
Japanese Albums (Oricon)	88
New Zealand Heatseeker Albums (RMNZ)	8
Scottish Albums (OCC)	5
Swiss Albums (Schweizer Hitparade)	82
UK Albums (OCC)	7
