= Johnny Marr =

English-born Irish musician (born 1963)

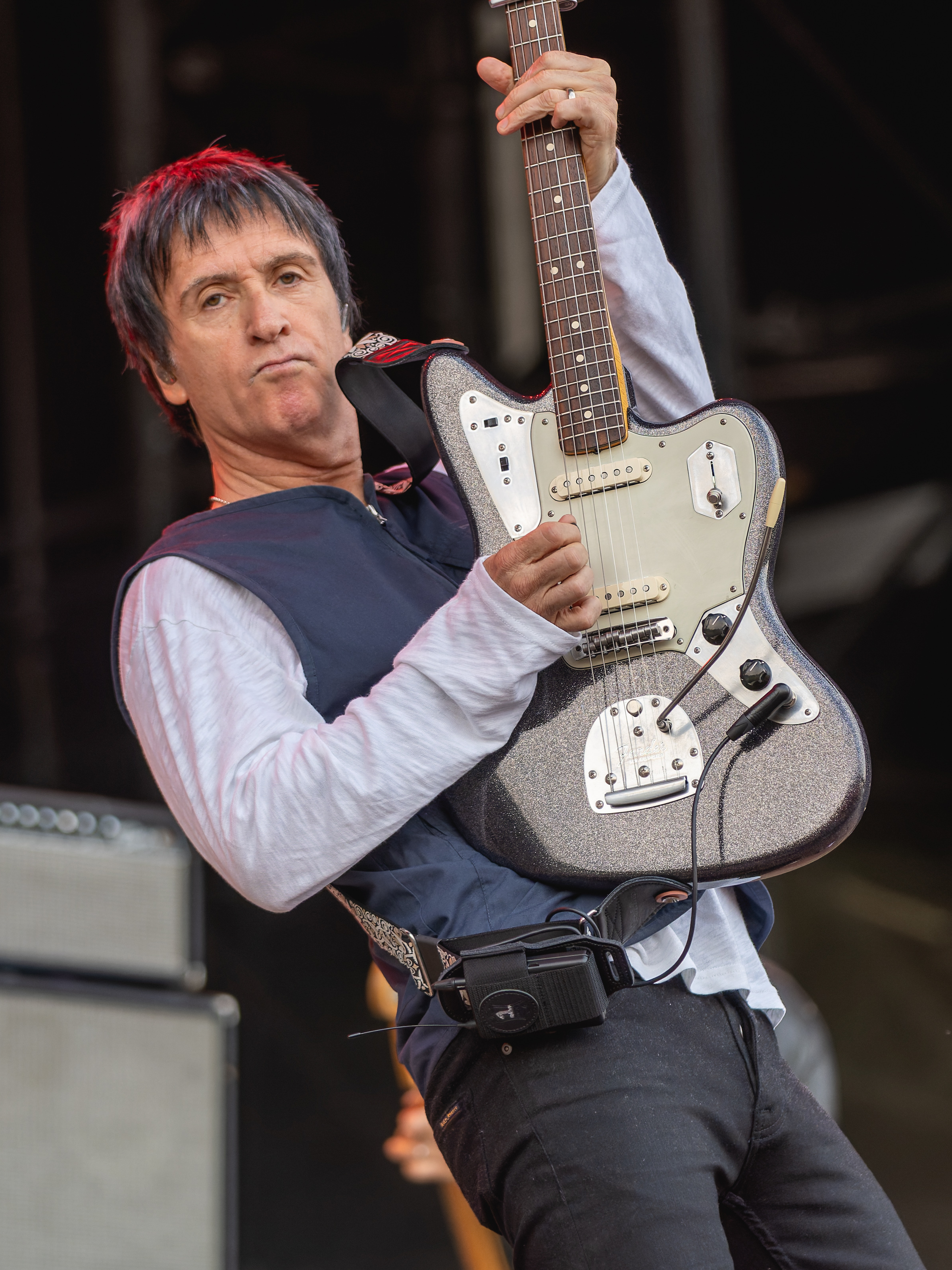
- Marr in 2024

Background information
- Born: John Martin Maher; 31 October 1963 (age 63); Manchester, England
- Genres: Alternative rock; indie pop; indie rock; jangle pop
- Occupations: Musician; singer; songwriter
- Instruments: Guitar; vocals; piano; keyboards; harmonica
- Years active: 1982–present
- Labels: Rough Trade; Sire; Warner Bros.; New Voodoo
- Formerly of: The Smiths; Electronic; Modest Mouse; The Pretenders; The Cribs; The The
- Website: johnny-marr.com

John Martin Marr (né Maher; born 31 October 1963) is an English-born Irish musician, singer and songwriter. He first achieved fame as the guitarist and co-songwriter of the Smiths, who were active from 1982 to 1987. He has since performed with numerous other bands and embarked on a solo career.

Born and raised in Manchester, England, to Irish parents, Marr formed his first band at the age of 13. He was part of several bands with Andy Rourke before forming the Smiths with Morrissey in 1982. The band attained commercial success and were critically acclaimed, with Marr's jangle pop guitar style becoming a distinctive part of their sound, but separated in 1987 due to personal differences between Marr and Morrissey. Since then, Marr has been a member of the Pretenders, The The, Electronic, Modest Mouse, and the Cribs, and he has become a prolific session musician, working with names such as Everything but the Girl, Bryan Ferry, Talking Heads, Pet Shop Boys, Girls Aloud, Crowded House, Noel Gallagher, The Avalanches, Blondie, Billie Eilish, Gorillaz, and Franz Ferdinand.

Having released an album titled Boomslang in 2003 under the name Johnny Marr and the Healers, Marr released his first solo album, The Messenger, in 2013. His second solo album, Playland, was released in 2014 followed by Call the Comet in 2018, and Fever Dreams Pts 1–4, in 2022. Marr's autobiography, Set the Boy Free, was published in 2016. Marr released his fifth studio album, The Age of Everything, on October 2, 2026.

Described by Alexis Petridis of The Guardian as "the 1980s' most inventive and distinctive guitarist", Marr was voted the fourth-best guitarist of the last 30 years in a poll conducted by the BBC in 2010. Phil Alexander, editor-in-chief of Mojo, described him as "arguably Britain's last great guitar stylist". In 2013, NME honoured Marr with its "Godlike Genius" award.

== Early life ==
Marr was born on 31 October 1963 in Saint Mary's Hospital in Manchester, son of John Joseph Maher and Frances Patricia Doyle, Irish emigrants to England from County Kildare. The family initially lived in Ardwick Green, but moved to a housing estate on Altrincham Road in Wythenshawe in 1972. Marr attended St Aloysius Primary School, in Ardwick, before moving to Sacred Heart Primary School. From 1975, he attended St Augustine's Catholic Grammar School, in Sharston, which in 1977 merged with other schools to form St John Plessington High School. Marr had aspirations to be a professional football player. He was approached by Nottingham Forest and had trials with Manchester City's youth team.

Marr's said his family's move to Wythenshawe was "like we'd moved to Beverly Hills", and that the move led to him meeting "a bunch of guitar players" which "changed his life". Guitarist Billy Duffy, later a member of The Cult, was in a high school band that practised across the street from Marr's new house, and Marr would hang out listening to them rehearsing. He learned to play the guitar with LP vinyl records and a guitar chords dictionary without a teacher. Marr formed his first band, the Paris Valentinos, at the age of 13, with Andy Rourke (who had gone to the same high school as Duffy) and Kevin Williams (later an actor, known as Kevin Kennedy), performing for the first time at a Jubilee party in Benchill in June 1977, playing covers by The Rolling Stones and Thin Lizzy.

In 1979, he played a single gig at Wythenshawe Forum with a band called Sister Ray and re-united with Rourke in a band called White Dice. White Dice entered a demo-tape competition organised by NME and won an audition for F-Beat Records, which they attended in April 1980 but were not signed. Around the age of 14, he began spelling his name "Marr" to simplify the pronunciation for those who had difficulty with his birth name "Maher", and to avoid confusion with Buzzcocks drummer John Maher.

In October 1980, Marr enrolled at Wythenshawe College, and was President of their Student Union. White Dice dissolved in 1981. Marr and Rourke then formed a funk band, Freak Party, with Simon Wolstencroft on drums. Around this time, Marr first met Matt Johnson, with whom he later collaborated.

== The Smiths ==
By early 1982, Freak Party had fizzled out, being unable to find a singer. Marr approached Rob Allman, singer in White Dice, who suggested Steven Morrissey, a singer with the short-lived punk band The Nosebleeds. Marr approached a mutual friend, Stephen Pomfret, asking to be introduced and they visited Morrissey at his house in Kings Road, Stretford, in May.

Marr's jangly Rickenbacker and Fender Telecaster guitar playing became synonymous with The Smiths' sound. Marr's friend Andy Rourke joined as bass player and Mike Joyce was recruited as drummer. Signing to indie label Rough Trade Records, they released their first single, "Hand in Glove", on 13 May 1983. By February 1984, the Smiths' fanbase was sufficiently large to launch the band's long-awaited debut album to number two in the UK chart. Early in 1985, the band released their second album, Meat Is Murder. It was more strident and political than its predecessor, and it was the band's only album (barring compilations) to reach number one in the UK charts. During 1985 the band completed lengthy tours of the UK and the US while recording the next studio record, The Queen Is Dead.

In 1989 Spin magazine rated The Queen is Dead as number one of "The Greatest Albums Ever Made". Spin was not alone in this designation—numerous periodicals rank the Smiths and their albums, especially The Queen is Dead, high on their best ever lists. NME, for example, has dubbed The Smiths the most important rock band of all time. A legal dispute with Rough Trade had delayed the album by almost seven months (it had been completed in November 1985), and Marr was beginning to feel the stress of the band's exhausting touring and recording schedule. He later told NME, "'Worse for wear' wasn't the half of it: I was extremely ill. By the time the tour actually finished it was all getting a little bit... dangerous. I was just drinking more than I could handle." Meanwhile, Rourke was fired from the band in early 1986 due to his use of heroin, although he was reinstated in short order. Despite their continued success, personal differences within the band—including the increasingly strained relationship between Morrissey and Marr—saw them on the verge of splitting.

In July 1987, Marr left the group, and auditions to find a replacement for him proved fruitless. By the time Strangeways, Here We Come (named after Strangeways Prison, Manchester) was released in September, the band had split up. The breakdown in the relationship has been primarily attributed to Morrissey's becoming annoyed by Marr's work with other artists and Marr's growing frustration with Morrissey's musical inflexibility. Referring to the songs recorded in the group's last session together (B-sides for the "Girlfriend in a Coma" single, which preceded the album's release), Marr said "I wrote 'I Keep Mine Hidden', but 'Work Is a Four-Letter Word' I hated. That was the last straw, really. I didn't form a group to perform Cilla Black songs". In 1989, in an interview with young fan Tim Samuels, later a BBC journalist, Morrissey said the lack of a managerial figure and business problems were to blame for the band's eventual split. In a 2016 interview, Marr agreed with this.

In 1996, The Smiths' drummer Mike Joyce took Morrissey and Marr to court, arguing that he had not received his fair share of recording and performance royalties. Morrissey and Marr had received most of the Smiths' recording and performance royalties, and allowed ten per cent each to Joyce and Rourke. Composition royalties were not an issue, as Rourke and Joyce had never been credited as composers for the band. Morrissey and Marr said the other two members of the band had always agreed to that split of the royalties, but the court found in favour of Joyce and ordered that he be paid over £1 million in back pay and receive 25% thenceforth.

Marr and Morrissey have repeatedly stated they will not reunite the band. In 2005, VH1 attempted to get the band back together on its Bands Reunited show but abandoned its attempt after the show's host, Aamer Haleem, failed to corner Morrissey before a show. In December 2005 it was announced that Johnny Marr and the Healers would play at Manchester v Cancer, a benefit show for cancer research being organised by Andy Rourke and his production company, Great Northern Productions. Rumours suggested that a Smiths reunion would occur at this concert but were dispelled by Marr on his website.

In an October 2007 interview on BBC Radio 5 Live, Marr hinted at a potential reformation in the future, saying that "stranger things have happened so, you know, who knows?" Marr went on to say that "It's no biggy. Maybe we will in 18 or 32 years' time when we all need to for whatever reasons, but right now Morrissey is doing his thing and I'm doing mine, so that's the answer really." This was the first indication of a possible Smiths reunion from Marr, who previously had said that reforming the band would be a bad idea. In 2008 Marr and Morrissey met and discussed the possibility of a reunion, but after initial enthusiasm from both parties, neither pursued the idea.

Marr's guitar playing "was a huge building block" for more Manchester bands that followed the Smiths. The Stone Roses guitarist John Squire has stated that Marr was a major influence. Oasis lead guitarist Noel Gallagher credited the Smiths as an influence, especially Marr, whom he described as a "fucking wizard", also stating that "he's unique, you can't play what he plays."

In August 2024, Morrissey said in a post on his website that he and Marr had received a "lucrative offer" to tour as The Smiths in 2025. The singer said he had accepted the invitation, but that Marr did not respond. Marr did not publicly comment, but had recently posted a picture of Reform UK leader Nigel Farage to rebuke calls to reunite in the aftermath of Oasis's reunion. Marr previously said in 2016 that Morrissey's politics aligned with Farage's, joking that any potential Smiths reunion would feature the politician as their replacement guitarist. Weeks later, on Marr's official Instagram, Marr's management issued an official statement in response to Morrissey's claims that Marr ignored the offer: "As for the offer to tour, I didn't ignore the offer - I said no."

Marr's statement also clarified other claims made by Morrissey's team on Morrissey's website such as that Marr had filed for 100% ownership of The Smiths' intellectual property and trademark rights without having consulted with Morrissey despite the fact that "Morrissey alone created the musical unit name "The Smiths' in May 1982". In Marr's statement, it was clarified that Marr discovered that the band did not own the trademark, and in an effort to protect the trademark from a third party attempt made in 2018 to use the band's name, Marr registered the trademark solely under his name after a failure to receive a response from Morrissey and his representatives. In January 2024, Marr signed an agreement to share ownership of the name with Morrissey, an agreement Morrissey has yet to follow up on. Marr further clarified that the efforts to take the trademark were not to tour under the Smiths' name with a singer of Marr's choice (contrary to the claims made by Morrissey's team), but rather simply to protect the band's name and use of the name.

== Post-Smiths ==
=== The Pretenders, the The, Electronic (1987–1999) ===
In August 1987, Marr was very briefly an official member of the Pretenders. In late 1987, he toured with the band and appeared on the single "Windows of the World" b/w "1969". He then left the Pretenders, and recorded and toured with the The from 1988 to 1994, recording two albums with the group. He simultaneously formed Electronic with New Order's Bernard Sumner. Electronic were intermittently active throughout the 1990s, releasing their final album in 1999.

=== Session work (1987–2002) ===
In 1992 Marr and Billy Duffy recorded a cover version of Ennio Morricone's The Good, the Bad and the Ugly for the NME compilation album Ruby Trax.

Marr has worked as a session musician and writing collaborator for artists including Pet Shop Boys, Bryan Ferry, Billy Bragg, Kirsty MacColl, Black Grape, Jane Birkin, Talking Heads, and Beck. Marr played guitar on four songs on Talking Heads' final album Naked, including the single "(Nothing But) Flowers", and he prominently appears in that song's music video.

Marr played guitar on several Pet Shop Boys songs; he continues to have guest appearances on their albums, with his most significant contribution on Release (2002). The only remix that Marr has ever done was for Pet Shop Boys—it was a mix of his favourite track from their 1987 album, Actually, called "I Want to Wake Up", and was released as the b-side to 1993's "Can You Forgive Her?". He later worked as a guest musician on the Oasis album Heathen Chemistry.

=== Johnny Marr and the Healers (2000–present) ===
In 2000, Marr recruited drummer Zak Starkey (son of Ringo Starr), Cavewaves guitarist Lee Spencer and former Kula Shaker bassist Alonza Bevan for his new project, Johnny Marr and the Healers. The band had taken two years to form as Marr had wanted members to be chosen "by chemistry". Their debut album Boomslang was released in 2003, with all lyrics and lead vocals by Marr. Their most recent release was a free downloadable track called "Free Christmas" in December 2011, while the album was re-released in 2024.

=== 7 Worlds Collide (2001–2009) ===
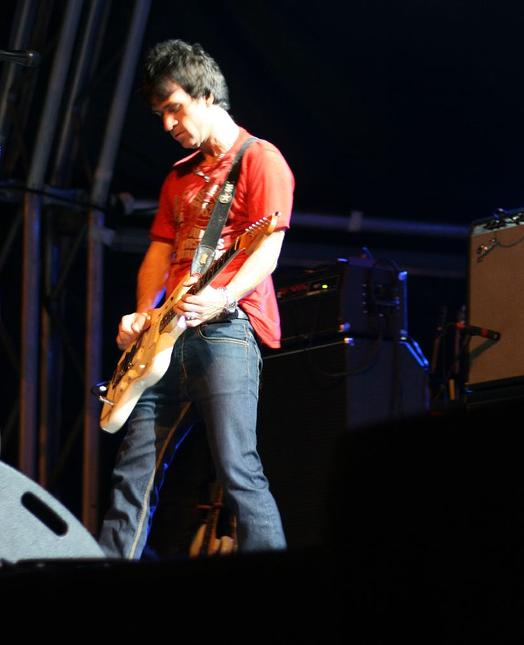
Marr onstage in 2007.

Marr performed two Smiths songs and music by others with a supergroup called 7 Worlds Collide consisting of members from Pearl Jam, Radiohead, Split Enz and others, assembled by Neil Finn of Split Enz and Crowded House in 2001. A second set of concerts took place in December 2008/January 2009, and an album of new studio material titled The Sun Came Out was released in August 2009 to raise money for Oxfam.

=== Modest Mouse (2006–2009) ===
In addition to his work as a recording artist, Marr has worked as a record producer. In 2006, he began work with Modest Mouse's Isaac Brock on songs that eventually were featured on the band's 2007 release, We Were Dead Before the Ship Even Sank. The band subsequently announced that Marr was a fully fledged member, and the reformed line-up toured extensively throughout 2006–07.

The new album reached number one on the American Billboard charts in late March 2007. For Marr, this was the first time he had had a number one record in the US. The highest chart position before that was with Electronic, who made the Top 40 in the singles chart with "Getting Away With It".

While touring in Los Angeles with Modest Mouse, Marr spent a day in John Frusciante's home studio and contributed to Frusciante's album The Empyrean. He recorded several guitar tracks on songs "Enough of Me" and "Central".

=== The Cribs (2008–2011) ===
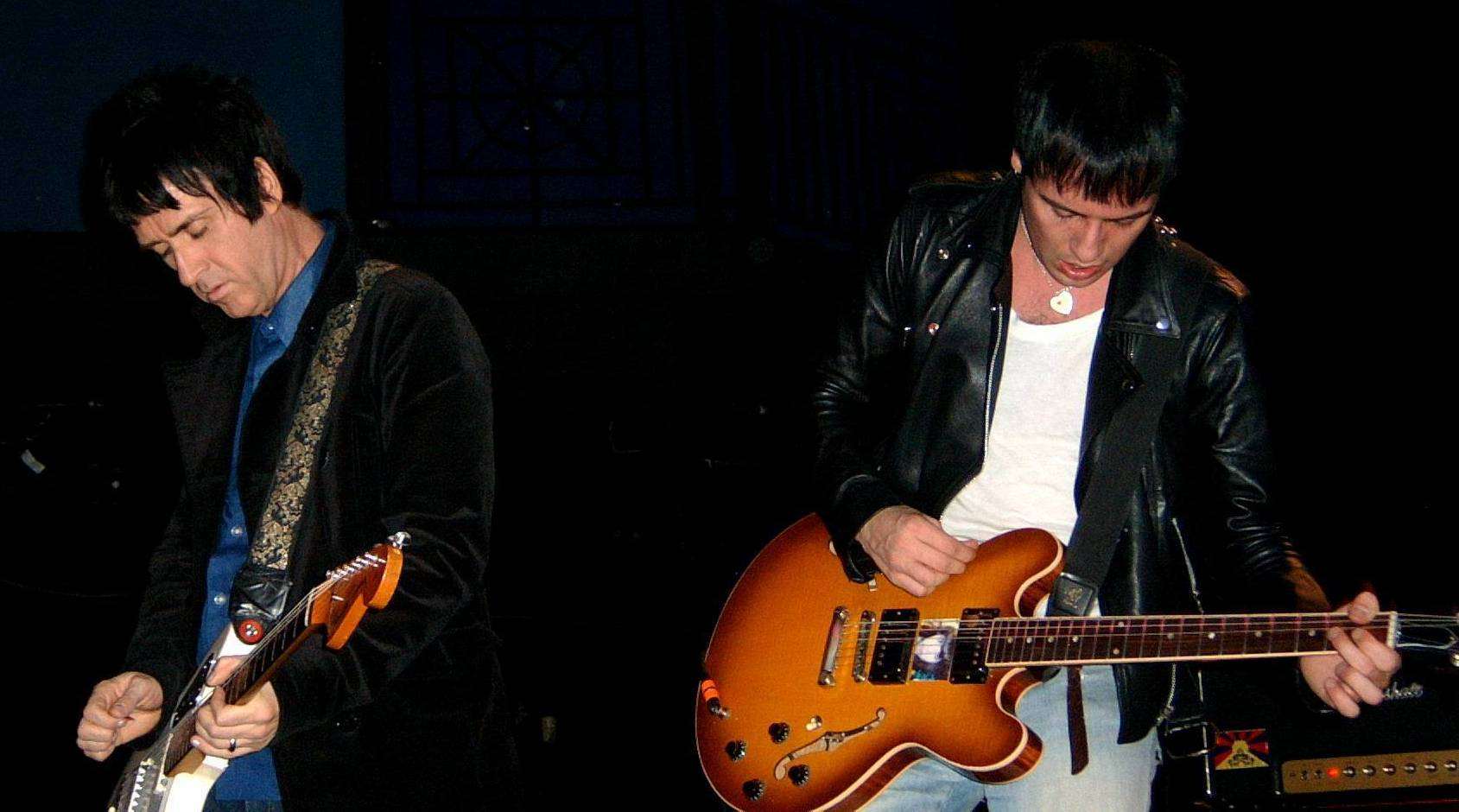
Marr performs as part of The Cribs at Washington, D.C.'s 9:30 Club in 2010.

Marr joined the Cribs in 2008, after meeting Gary Jarman when they were both in Portland, Oregon. In 2009 they recorded the album Ignore the Ignorant, which was released on 7 September that year and peaked at No. 8 on the UK charts. Marr has said the album is "as good as anything I've done".

In April 2011 it was confirmed that Marr would no longer be part of the band. Marr, who had been understood to officially leave the band in January, released a statement in which he affirmed that he would be working on solo material "over the next year or so".

Marr returned to play with the Cribs during the second of two special Christmas shows at Leeds Academy on 19 December 2013.

=== Further session work and solo albums (2011–present) ===
In the late 2007, Marr's daughter Sonny performed backing vocals on the track "Even a Child" on Crowded House's album Time on Earth, on which her father Marr played guitars. He played a large role in making the score for the 2010 science-fiction/drama film Inception, which was written and directed by Christopher Nolan. Using a 12-string-guitar, he produced repetitive, simple melancholic tones that became a character theme for the protagonist, played by Leonardo DiCaprio. "I kept coming up with this phrase 'churned-up,'" Marr said, "You've got this character who all the way through the film has this underlying turmoil." Longtime Nolan collaborator, composer Hans Zimmer, penned the soundtrack. Marr has been working since 2007 with Fender to develop and design his own guitar. American Songwriter wrote that "Fender had to modify their manufacturing process due to some of Marr's changes, but it will still sell for around the same price as other American-made Fenders."

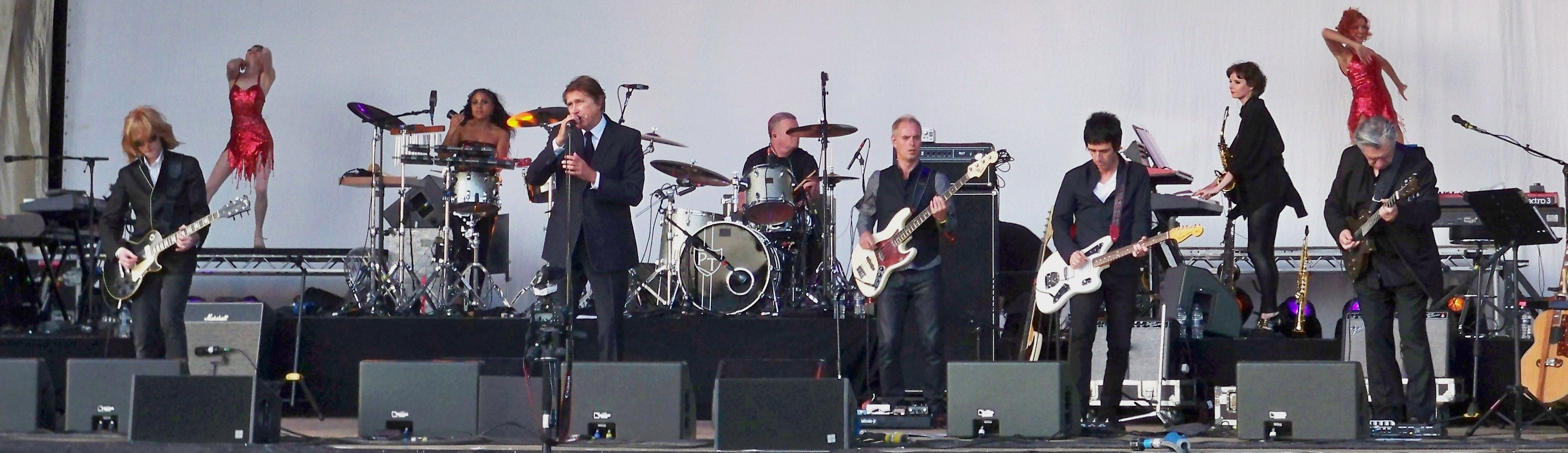
Marr (front row, fourth from right) performing with Bryan Ferry in 2012.

On 25 February 2013, Marr released his début solo album, The Messenger, in the UK through Warner Bros. and on 26 February in the US through Sire. The album was preceded by the single "Upstarts", released in the UK on 18 February 2013. Marr recorded music for the film The Amazing Spider-Man 2 with Hans Zimmer, Pharrell Williams, Michael Einziger and David A. Stewart.

Marr's second solo album, Playland, was released on 6 October 2014. He also announced a worldwide tour around the release of the "Playland" album that commenced in the UK on 13 October 2014. The album's lead single was "Easy Money". In October 2014, Marr appeared as a guest musician for Hans Zimmer at his two concerts, Hans Zimmer: Revealed, at London's Hammersmith Apollo. In December 2014, Marr announced the cancellation of the remainder of his US tour, in support of Playland, due to a close family illness. In January 2016, Marr announced new and rescheduled dates as part of his West Coast 'California Jam' tour, which took place in the US throughout February and March 2016.

Marr features on "Ballad of the Mighty I", the second single from Noel Gallagher's High Flying Birds' Chasing Yesterday, playing lead guitar, and joined the band for this song at a concert in Manchester. Marr contributed the track "My Monster" for the Blondie album Pollinator, released on 5 May 2017. On 12 March 2018 Marr announced his third solo album, Call the Comet, which was released on 15 June 2018.

Marr performed a set on The Other Stage at the 2019 Glastonbury Festival on 29 June, and later joined the Killers during their headline set on the Pyramid Stage to play guitar on "This Charming Man" and "Mr. Brightside" as part of the band's encore.

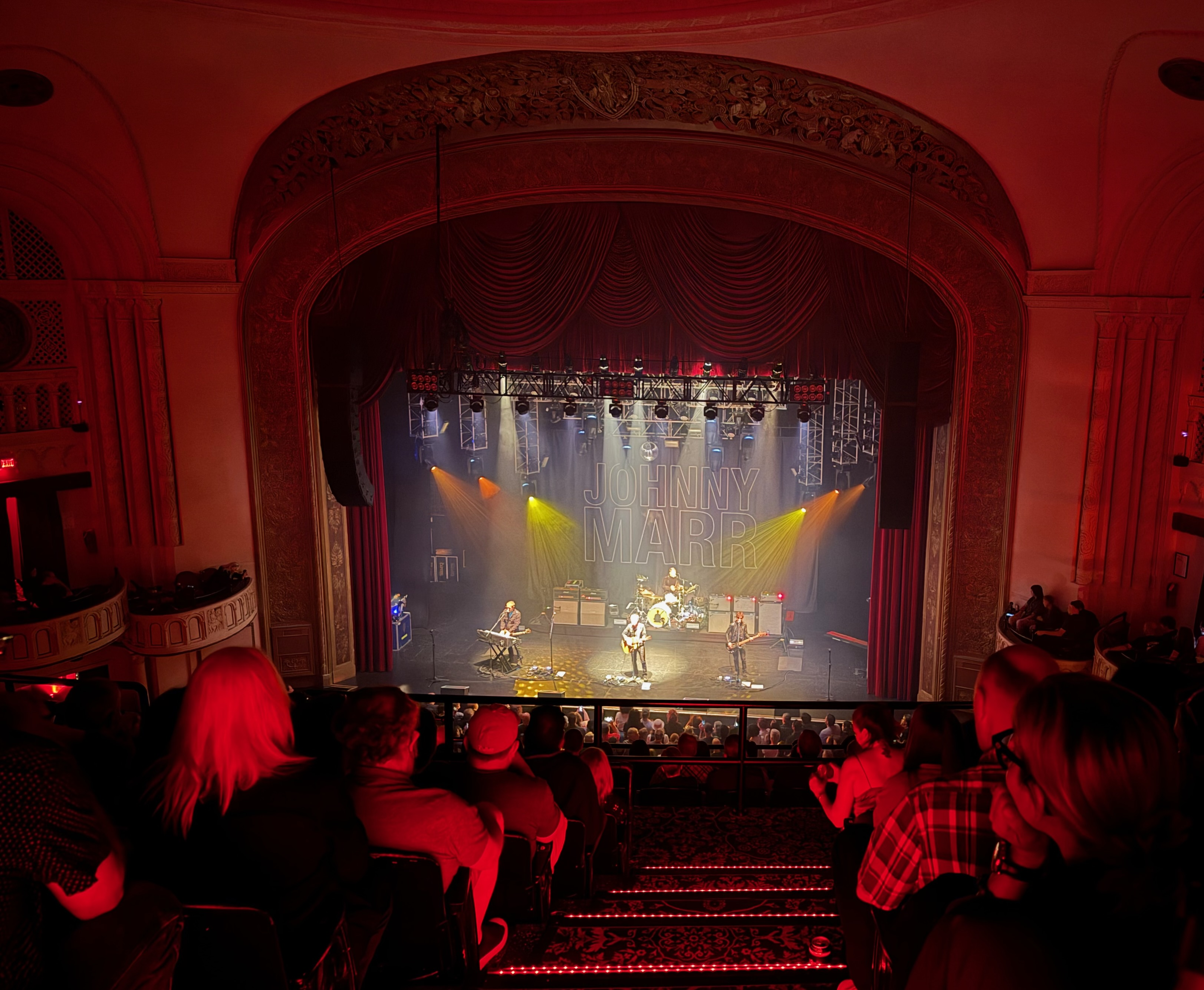
Marr at the Capitol Theatre in Port Chester, New York, in 2025

As Hans Zimmer composed for the James Bond film No Time to Die, Marr was brought in to perform in the score. He also played guitar in the theme song performed by Billie Eilish, and was present during the track's live debut at the 2020 Brit Awards. In August 2021, Marr signed a worldwide album deal with BMG and on 31 August he debuted the single "Spirit Power & Soul" on his social media platforms, a song taken from his EP, Fever Dreams Pt 1, that was released on 15 October 2021. His fourth solo album, Fever Dreams Pts 1-4, which is also his first double LP, was released on 25 February 2022. Marr would join the Killers for their 2022 tour to promote the 2020 album Imploding the Mirage, providing an opening act for the American tour dates and also joining the Killers for a Smiths cover and "Mr. Brightside" in the encore. The Los Angeles tour date saw the Killers and Marr also performing on stage with former Fleetwood Mac guitarist Lindsey Buckingham.

In November 2023, the album Spirit Power: The Best of Johnny Marr was released that included highlights from his four solo albums plus two new studio recordings. An accompanying UK tour was also announced, with gigs played in Newcastle, Glasgow, Leeds, Liverpool, Wolverhampton, Cardiff, Bristol, London, Brighton and Nottingham during April 2024.

In June 2026, Marr released "Spin" as the lead single for his album The Age of Everything, which was released on 2 October 2026.

== Style and influences ==
Marr's three biggest influences on guitar were Nile Rodgers, Bert Jansch, and James Williamson from the Stooges. His jangly guitar playing in the Smiths was influenced by Neil Young and Danny Whitten of Crazy Horse, and James Honeyman-Scott of the Pretenders. He has also stated that the Beatles' George Harrison, in particular his playing in "Ticket to Ride", inspired him to play Rickenbacker 12-string guitars.

During his time in the Smiths, Marr often tuned his guitar up a full step to F♯ to accommodate Morrissey's vocal range, and also used open tunings. He is known for creating arpeggio melodies and (sometimes) unusual chord progressions, and makes wide use of open strings while chording to create chiming. When performing with the Smiths, he wanted to play music which was pop. "100% of my focus was on providing interesting guitar hooks and putting some kind of space-age twist on the guitarist's role. The pop guitarist crossed with the mad professor. That's how I thought of myself." In a 2007 interview for the BBC, Marr said that his goal with the Smiths was to "pare down" his style and avoid rock guitar clichés.

Citing producer Phil Spector as an influence, Marr said, "I like the idea of records, even those with plenty of space, that sound 'symphonic'. I like the idea of all the players merging into one atmosphere". Marr was also influenced by Rory Gallagher, Pete Townshend of the Who, Jimi Hendrix, John McGeoch of Magazine and Siouxsie and the Banshees, and John McLaughlin, who he called "the greatest guitar player that's ever lived". When forming the Smiths, the Velvet Underground was a key influence, along with Keith Richards of the Rolling Stones. Marc Bolan of T. Rex also had a strong impact on him because of the groove and the sound that put the listener in a daze. He explained, "I try to think about the guitar along the spectrum of James Williamson, who was in the Stooges during the Raw Power era, on the one hand to John McLaughlin and his solo record, My Goal's Beyond. I like all the spectrum in between, and that might be – and is – Richard Lloyd of Television, John McGeoch from Siouxsie and the Banshees, Nile Rodgers. To me these people are magicians and artists."

When Marr started to sing as a solo artist in 2012, he said, "[The frontpersons] I related to were Peter Perrett, Colin Newman, Pete Shelley, Siouxsie Sioux. They were singing from the mind and had integrity." He added, "I'm absolutely not interested in being the frontman in a band that bares my soul or feelings in song. Siouxsie Sioux, or Ray Davies, or Howard Devoto don't sing from some weird, shlocky, sentimental place. What's wrong with singing from the brain?".

== Guitars ==
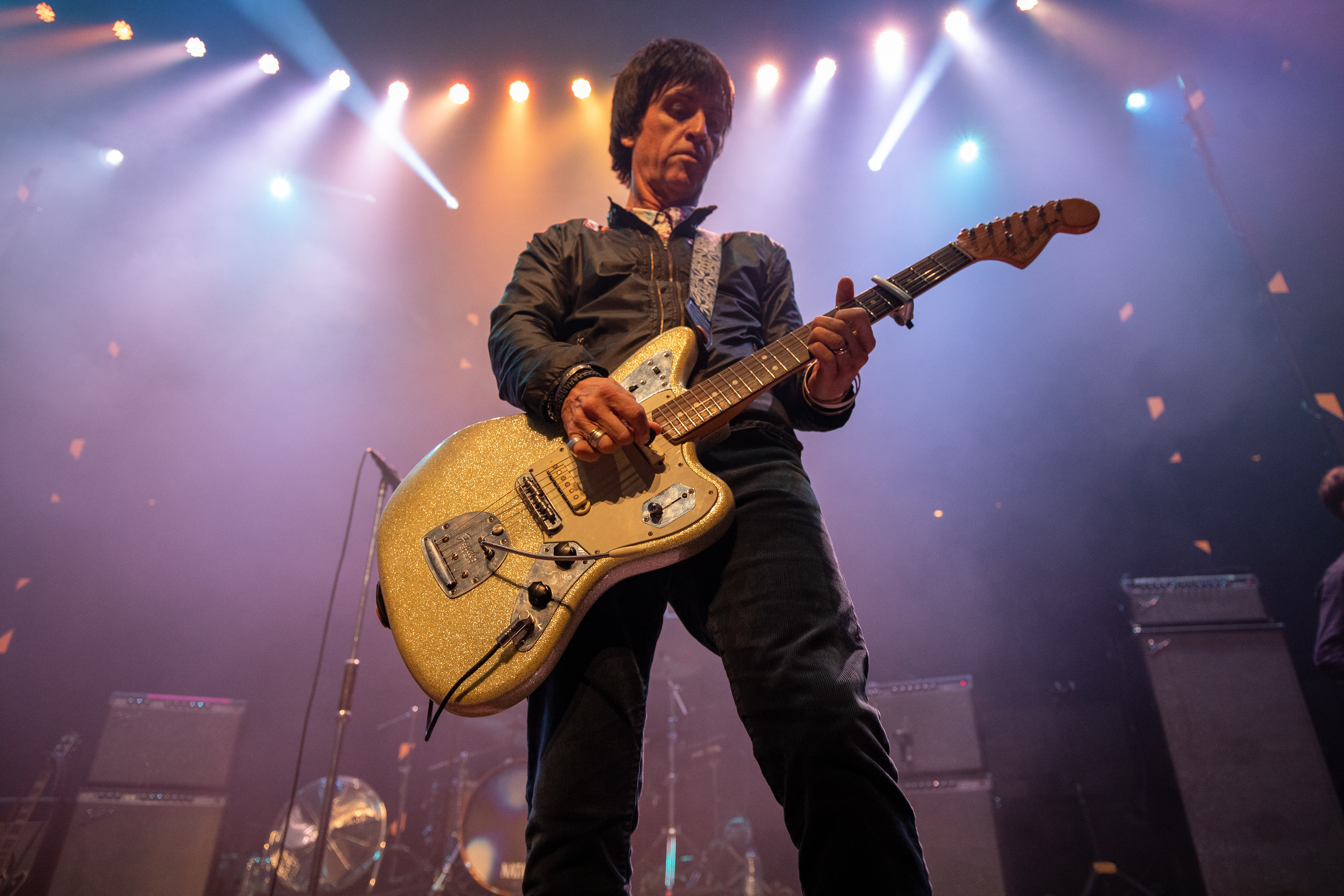
Marr playing a Fender Jaguar at the 2019 AIM Awards

Marr has used a variety of guitars throughout his career; below is a selection of these.

- Fender Jaguar – He has played a Jaguar since 2005, and in 2012 Fender issued the Johnny Marr Signature Fender Jaguar, which has several modifications, including specially voiced Johnny Marr custom pickups by Bare Knuckle Pickups and a four position blade switch.
- Rickenbacker 330 – This guitar (made in 1982) is most often associated with Marr due to its 'jangly' sound for which he is known. He played it with the Smiths and it can also be seen in the promotional video for "Vivid" by Electronic. He also owns a "360" 12-string model that belonged to Pete Townshend. Marr acknowledged that many of the songs that were thought to have been recorded on this Rickenbacker were, in fact, recorded on a Fender Telecaster. Marr lent the guitar to Noel Gallagher during the recording of Definitely Maybe, the debut studio album by Oasis. It also appears on the cover of the band's debut single "Supersonic".
- Fender Stratocaster - Marr used a 1962 Fender Stratocaster to record "There Is a Light That Never Goes Out" and for much of the Smiths' 1986 UK and US tours. He also used a 1963 Fender Stratocaster to record "The Boy with a Thorn in his Side" which was one of his main guitars on the 1986 tour. Marr also owned a sunburst 1965 Fender Stratocaster, serial number L68296, which was later owned by Noel Gallagher.
- Fender Telecaster - while Marr was associated with the Rickenbacker 330, he admitted that many of the "jangly" songs that were recorded by the Smiths were in fact done with John Porter's 1954 Telecaster, including "This Charming Man".
- Gibson Les Paul – Marr owns several, including a rare 1960 model. His cardinal red Les Paul was acquired in 1984 and was used extensively with the Smiths and with The The, appearing in the video for "Dogs of Lust". He has now added a Bigsby tremolo system to this guitar as well as Seymour Duncan pick-ups with coil taps. He gave his 1960 model (also previously owned by Pete Townshend) to Noel Gallagher during Oasis's formative years. Gallagher broke the guitar's neck hitting a fan who jumped on stage. Marr then gave Gallagher yet another vintage (black) Gibson Les Paul (used on much of The Queen is Dead) so Oasis could carry on touring.
- Gibson ES-355 – His 1960 cherry red model was used heavily with the Smiths during 1984 and inspired Suede guitarist Bernard Butler and Noel Gallagher to buy one for themselves. It was bought for him by Seymour Stein in New York as an incentive for the Smiths to sign to his label, Sire Records. He also owns a black model, which appears in the videos for "Forbidden City" and "For You" by Electronic, and a sunburst, 12-string model that was used heavily on the Smiths' final LP, Strangeways, Here We Come. This 12-string model was later given to Bernard Butler.
- Gibson SG – Marr used a cherry red SG as his main guitar when playing with the Healers. He also owns a unique, blonde SG.
- Fender Jazzmaster – Marr used several Jazzmasters while he was a member of Modest Mouse.

In 2023, Marr owned 132 guitars. In September 2023, a book titled Marr's Guitars was published, showcasing 53 of his favourite electric and acoustic guitars.

In September 2026, two of Marr's guitars sold for a combined £563,200 at an auction at Christie's. His 1982 Rickenbacker 330 Jetglo sold for £358,400, while his Cherry Red Gibson ES-355 fetched £204,800. There were 111 lots overall, with just over £3.6 million raised (more than three times what was estimated). The proceeds benefitted two charities of Marr's choosing: The Guide Dogs for the Blind Association and the National Autistic Society.

=== Amplifiers and effects ===
Marr has used Fender Amplifiers almost exclusively throughout his career. During his time with the Smiths, he used a Twin Reverb, a Deluxe Reverb and a Bassman amongst others. He also used a Fender Champ with The The and the Cribs. When playing with the Cribs, he used a Super Reverb. Marr's love of the Fender sound continues to this day with his Deluxe Reverb. He has used other amps, including the Roland JC-120, Vox AC30, Mesa Boogie and Marshall cabinets. Marr typically uses Boss effects units, notably that company's CE-2 chorus effect, the TW-1 touch wah wah pedal, and the OD-2 overdrive pedal.

== Recognition ==
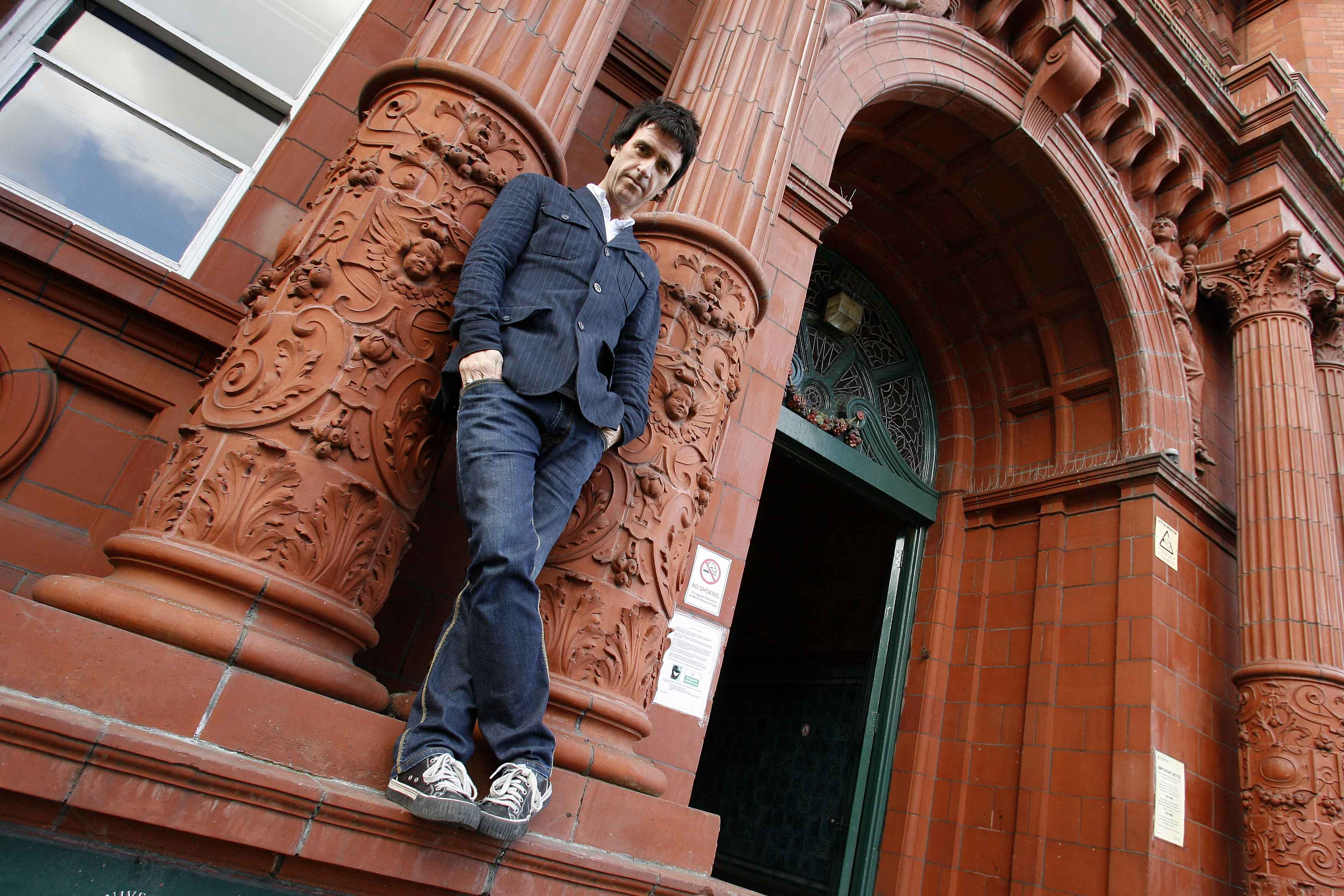
Marr at the University of Salford in 2012

In 2007 Marr was appointed as a visiting professor in music at the University of Salford, where he delivered an inaugural lecture (on 4 November 2008), and a series of workshops and masterclasses to students on the BA (Hons) Popular Music and Recording programme.

On 19 July 2012, Marr received an honorary doctorate from the University of Salford for "outstanding achievements" and "changing the face of British guitar music". In 2013, Marr received NME's "Godlike Genius" award. The magazine stated, "Not content with rewriting the history of music with one of the world's greatest-ever bands, the Smiths, he's continued to push boundaries and evolve throughout his career, working with some of the best and most exciting artists on the planet."

On 3 November 2018, Marr unveiled a plaque in his parents' hometown of Athy in County Kildare, Ireland. This was part of the Made of Athy project.

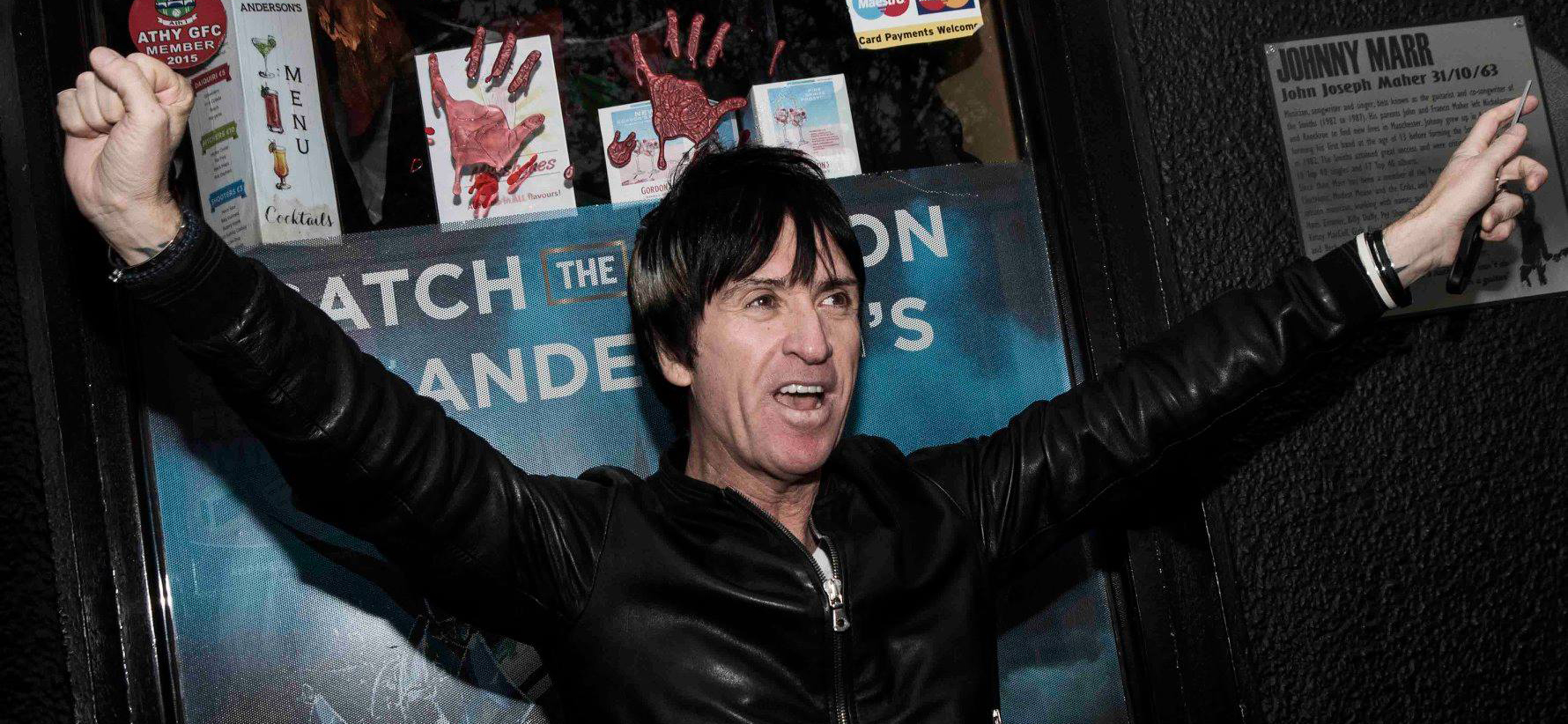
Johnny Marr returns to Athy to accept Made of Athy Award

On 19 January 2021, Marr received the Boss Lifetime Achievement Award as part of the NAMM music industry trade show.

== In popular culture ==
Marr was the titular subject of the 2007 single "Johnny Marr" by the Canadian singer Carole Pope, formerly of the band Rough Trade. Pope described her inspiration and choice of Marr thus: "I was actually getting nostalgic, which I never really do, about living on a certain street in Toronto in the '80s. The Smiths were the soundtrack of that time. I love [...] Morrissey, but I know he's trouble."

Marr is the subject of "Johnny Marr Is Dead" by the Brian Jonestown Massacre, but he is not mentioned in the lyrics. He is also the subject of Clear's 2003 single satirising the music industry, "Johnny Marr Was a Mistake". He is mentioned in the 1988 single "John Kettley Is a Weatherman" by British band A Tribe of Toffs.

Marr is portrayed by Laurie Kynaston in the Morrissey biopic England Is Mine (2017).

== Personal life ==
Marr and his wife Angie have been together since 1979, before the Smiths formed. They have two children, including Nile Marr. Nile is a musician, and was frontman of the band Man Made before going solo. After residing in Portland, Oregon, for more than five years, the family returned to Britain for Marr to record his solo album in Manchester.

Marr gave up eating meat around 1985 in solidarity with Morrissey and Angie. He stated: "It's not a good idea to have a number one album called Meat Is Murder and be seen eating a bacon sarnie." After meeting American rap group Naughty by Nature, he was inspired by their philosophy of strength through health, and soon after quit drinking and smoking, and became a vegan. Marr is a keen runner, and completed the 2010 New York Marathon in a time of 3:54:18. He has been a supporter of Manchester City F.C. since 1972, and has been seen attending games. He is a patron of the Manchester Modernist Society.

Marr does not consider himself English or British, saying, "Anyone who looks back on the past 30 years of my career will know that I've always described myself as Mancunian Irish. I was the first of my family to be born in England. I've never described myself as British or English. I'm either Mancunian or Mancunian Irish – that is a culture and a nationality that is a thing unto itself."

== Backing band ==
Current members

- James Doviak – guitar, keyboards, backing vocals (2011–present)
- Jack Mitchell – drums (2012–present)
- Iwan Gronow – bass, guitar, backing vocals (2013–present)

== Discography ==
Johnny Marr discography
- Studio albums: 5
- EPs: 3
- Soundtrack albums: 4
- Live albums: 4
- Compilation albums: 2
- Singles: 24
- Music videos: 22

=== Studio albums ===
Year	Title	Peak chart position
Year	Title	UK
2013	The Messenger	10
2014	Playland	9
2018	Call the Comet	7
2022	Fever Dreams Pts 1–4	4
2026	The Age of Everything	5

=== Live albums ===
Year	Title	Peak chart positions	
Year	Title	UK	UK Vinyl
2015	Adrenalin Baby	96	2
2018	Comet Tripper – Live at the Roundhouse	—	—
2018	Comet Tripper – Live in Manchester	—	—
2025	Look Out Live!	—	24

=== Compilation albums ===
Year	Title	Peak chart position
Year	Title	UK
2019	Single Life	—
2023	Spirit Power: The Best of Johnny Marr	7

=== Albums (as band member) ===
Johnny Marr as a member of	Title	Year	Peak chart positions			Certifications (sales thresholds)
Johnny Marr as a member of	Title	Year	UK	US	UK Vinyl	Certifications (sales thresholds)
The Smiths	The Smiths	1984	2	150	—	UK: Gold
The Smiths	Hatful of Hollow	1984	7	—	8	UK: Platinum
The Smiths	Meat Is Murder	1985	1	110	12	UK: Gold
The Smiths	The Queen Is Dead	1986	2	70	2	UK: 2× Platinum; US: Gold
The Smiths	The World Won't Listen	1987	2	—	—	UK: Gold
The Smiths	Louder Than Bombs	1987	38	62	—	UK: Gold; US: Gold
The Smiths	Strangeways, Here We Come	1987	2	55	—	UK: Gold; US: Gold
The Smiths	Rank	1988	2	77	—	UK: Gold
The Smiths	Stop Me	1988	—	—	—	
The The	Mind Bomb	1989	4	138	—	
Electronic	Electronic	1991	2	109	5	UK: Gold
The Smiths	Best I	1992	1	139	10	UK: Gold
The Smiths	Best II	1992	29	—	11	UK: Gold
The The	Dusk	1993	2	142	—	
The The	Solitude	1993	—	—	—	
The Smiths	Singles	1995	5	—	—	UK: Platinum
Electronic	Raise the Pressure	1996	8	143	—	UK: Silver
Electronic	Twisted Tenderness	1999	9	—	—	
7 Worlds Collide	7 Worlds Collide	2001	—	—	—	
The Smiths	The Very Best of The Smiths	2001	30	—	—	UK: Platinum
The The	45 RPM	2002	—	—	—	
The The	London Town Box Set	2002	—	—	—	
Johnny Marr + The Healers	Boomslang	2003	—	—	33	
Electronic	Get the Message – The Best of Electronic	2006	—	—	27	
Modest Mouse	We Were Dead Before the Ship Even Sank	2007	47	1	—	US: Gold
The Smiths	The Sound of The Smiths	2008	21	—	—	UK: 3× Platinum
The Smiths	The Smiths Singles Box	2008	—	—	—	
Modest Mouse	No One's First, and You're Next	2009	—	15	—	
The Cribs	Ignore the Ignorant	2009	8	—	—	UK: Silver
7 Worlds Collide	The Sun Came Out	2009	58	—	—	
The Smiths	Complete	2011	63	—	—	
The Cribs	Payola: 2002–2012	2013	69	—	—	
Electronic	1989 Remixes 1992	2022	—	—	18	
Electronic	1996 Remixes 1999	2026	—	—	—	

=== Albums (as a guest musician) ===
In the 1980s and 1990s, Marr played on three Billy Bragg recordings. In the late 1980s, he performed on albums by Bryan Ferry and Talking Heads. In the 1990s and 2000s, he performed on three Pet Shop Boys albums, and also plays guitar and harmonica on their Xenomania-produced album, Yes, released in 2009. In the 1990s, he also performed on albums by M People, Beck and Tom Jones. In the 2000s, he played on albums by bands such as Noel Gallagher's High Flying Birds, Pearl Jam, Jane Birkin, Lisa Germano and Crowded House. He also plays guitar on Girls Aloud's fifth album, Out of Control, on a track entitled "Rolling Back the Rivers in Time", as well as harmonica on the track "Love Is the Key". He also appeared on two tracks ("Enough of Me" and "Central") on John Frusciante's album The Empyrean which was released January 2009.

=== Albums (as producer) ===
Year	Artist	Album	Peak chart position
Year	Artist	Album	UK
1998	Marion	The Program	—
2002	Haven	Between the Senses	26
2004	Haven	All for a Reason	91

=== Albums (other appearances) ===
Year	Album Title	Artist	Track(s) / Specific Credits
1984	Everything but the Girl	Everything But The Girl	"Native Land"
1986	Talking with the Taxman About Poetry	Billy Bragg	"Greetings to the New Brunette", "The Passion"
1992	Ruby Trax – The NME's Roaring Forty	Various (w/ Billy Duffy)	"The Good, the Bad and the Ugly"
2010	1969 Key to Change	Various	"Tendency to Be Free"
2026	Help(2)	War Child Records (w/ Albarn, Chatten, Tempest)	"Flags"
2026	The Mountain	Gorrilaz	"The Empty Dream Machine" (also co-wrote), "The Plastic Guru" (also co-wrote), "Casablanca" (also co-wrote), "The Sweet Prince" (also co-wrote)
2027	High Noon	Blondie	"Spectral Eyes" (also wrote the track)

=== Extended plays ===
Year	Title
2021	"Fever Dreams Pt 1"
2021	"Fever Dreams Pt 2"
2022	"Fever Dreams Pt 3"

=== Singles ===
Year	Title	Peak chart position	Album
Year	Title	UK Vinyl	Album
2010	"Life Is Sweet" (Todd Margaret Theme)	—	Non-album single
2013	"The Messenger" (promo)	—	The Messenger
2013	"Upstarts"	—	The Messenger
2013	"New Town Velocity"	—	The Messenger
2013	"European Me" (promo)	—	The Messenger
2014	"Easy Money"	—	Playland
2015	"Dynamo"	36	Playland
2015	"I Feel You"	3	Non-album single
2015	"Candidate"	3	Playland
2017	"The Priest" (with Maxine Peake)	—	Non-album single
2018	"Hi Hello"	1	Call the Comet
2018	"Spiral Cities"	3	Call the Comet
2018	"Summer in the City" (with Matt Johnson)	—	Non-album single
2019	"Armatopia"	—	Single Life
2019	"The Bright Parade"	—	Single Life
2021	"Spirit Power and Soul"	1	Fever Dreams Pts 1–4
2021	"Lightning People"	1	Fever Dreams Pts 1–4
2021	"Tenement Time"	—	Fever Dreams Pts 1–4
2022	"The Speed of Love"	2	Fever Dreams Pts 1–4
2022	"Night and Day" (edit)	—	
2023	"Somewhere"	—	Spirit Power: The Best of Johnny Marr
2026	"Spin"	—	The Age of Everything
2026	"Ophelia"	—	The Age of Everything
2026	"It's Time"	—	The Age of Everything

Marr's recording of "Life Is Sweet", the theme song he wrote for the Channel Four Sitcom The Increasingly Poor Decisions of Todd Margaret, was released on Echo Records.

Marr's cover version of the Depeche Mode track "I Feel You" was in support of Record Store Day. Its B-side was a version of "Please, Please, Please Let Me Get What I Want" (live).

The non-album single "Armatopia" was selected for the soundtrack for eFootball Pro Evolution Soccer 2020.

=== Singles (as a guest musician) ===
Year	Artist	Title	Album
1984	Everything But The Girl	"Native Land"	
1984	Quando Quango	"Atom Rock" b/w "Triangle"	
1984	Sandie Shaw	"Hand In Glove" (also co-wrote) b/w "I Don't Owe You Anything" (also co wrote) "Jeane" (also co-wrote)	
1986	Billy Bragg	"Levi Stubbs' Tears" appears on b-side "Walk Away Renée"	Talking with the Taxman About Poetry
1986	Billy Bragg	"Greetings to the New Brunette"	Talking with the Taxman About Poetry
1987	Bryan Ferry	"The Right Stuff" (also co-wrote)	Bête Noire
1988	Bryan Ferry	"Kiss and Tell"	Bête Noire
1988	Bryan Ferry	"Limbo"	Bête Noire
1988	Talking Heads	"Nothing But Flowers"	Naked
1989	Kirsty MacColl	"Days"	Kite
1990	Stex	"Still Feel The Rain"	
1991	Kirsty MacColl	"Walking Down Madison" (also co-wrote)	Electric Landlady
1991	Billy Bragg	"Sexuality" (also co-wrote)	Don't Try This At Home
1991	Banderas	"This Is Your Life"	Ripe
1993	Kirsty MacColl	"Can't Stop Killing You" (as co-writer only)	Titanic Days
1994	Denise Johnson	"Rays Of The Rising Sun"	
1994	Pet Shop Boys	"Liberation" appears on b-side "Decadence"	Very
1995	Electrafixion	"Lowdown" (as co-writer only)	Burned
1996	Black Grape	"Fat Neck"	
1997	Billy Bragg	"The Boy Done Good" (also co-wrote)	Bloke On Bloke
1998	England United	"(How Does It Feel To Be) On Top Of The World" (as co-writer only)	
1998	Marion	"Miyako Hideaway" (also co-wrote) b/w "Speechless" "We Love Everything" "Minus You" "Promise Q" (also co-wrote)	The Program
2002	Pet Shop Boys	"Home And Dry"	Release
2002	Pet Shop Boys	"I Get Along" b/w "Searching for the Face of Jesus" "Between Two Islands"	Release
2002	Beth Orton	"Concrete Sky" (as co-writer only)	Daybreaker
2003	Haven	"Tell Me" appears on b-sides "Whatever Feels Right" and "I am Leaving"	
2004	Haven	"Wouldn't Change a Thing" b/w "More Than I Said"	All for a Reason
2004	Haven	"Change Direction"	All for a Reason
2004	Pet Shop Boys	"Flamboyant" appears on b-side "I Didn't Get Where I Am Today"	Pop Art
2006	Transit Kings	"America Is Unavailable"	Living In A Giant Candle Winking At God
2007	Crowded House	"Don't Stop Now"	Time On Earth
2009	Pet Shop Boys	"Did You See Me Coming?"	Yes
2009	Pet Shop Boys	"Beautiful People"	Yes
2014	Bryan Ferry	"Loop De Li"	Avonmore
2014	Tim Wheeler	"Sheltered Youth" e.p. appears on track "Ariadna"	
2015	Noel Gallagher's High Flying Birds	"Ballad Of The Mighty I"	Chasing Yesterday
2017	The Charlatans	"Plastic Machinery"	Different Days
2017	Blondie	"Fun" appears on b-side "My Monster" (also wrote)	Pollinator
2018	Noel Gallagher's High Flying Birds	"If Love Is The Law"	Who Built The Moon?
2019	A Certain Ratio	"Shack Up"	ACR:Box
2020	The Avalanches	"The Divine Chord"	We Will Always Love You
2020	Billie Eilish	"No Time to Die"	
2022	Blitz Vega	"Strong Forever"	
2022	Noel Gallagher's High Flying Birds	"Pretty Boy"	Council Skies
2023	Noel Gallagher's High Flying Birds	"Council Skies"	Council Skies
2023	Noel Gallagher's High Flying Birds	"Open The Door, See What You Find"	Council Skies
2025	Franz Ferdinand	"Build It Up"	
2026	jennylee	"GIRLS"	
2026	Blondie	"Spectral Eyes" (also wrote)	High Noon

As a band member he has appeared on singles by the Smiths, the Pretenders, the The, Electronic, 7 Worlds Collide, Johnny Marr + the Healers, Modest Mouse, the Cribs, and Freak Party (with Angie Brown).

=== Singles and other songs (as producer) ===
Year	Artist	Title	Album
1985	The Impossible Dreamers	"August Avenue"	
1989	Kirsty MacColl	"Days" produced b-side "Happy"	Kite
1990	Andrew Berry	"Kiss Me I'm Cold" (co-mixed only) and produced b-side "That's My Business"	
1991	Billy Bragg	"Sexuality" (also co-wrote)	Don't Try This At Home
1991	Billy Bragg	"Cindy of a Thousand Lives"	Don't Try This At Home
1991	Billy Bragg	"North Sea Bubble"	Don't Try This At Home
1992	Moodswings	"Skinthieves" (as audio engineer only)	Moodfood
1998	Marion	"Miyako Hideaway" (also co-wrote) b/w "Speechless" "We Love Everything" "Minus You" "Promise Q" (also co-wrote)	The Program
1999	Billy Bragg	"Shirley"	Reaching to the Converted
2001	Haven	"Til the End" e.p.	Between The Senses
2001	Haven	"Beautiful Thing" b/w "Lying Tongue" "Through It All"	Between The Senses
2001	Haven	"Let it Live" b/w "Comes a Change" "Last Dance"	Between The Senses
2002	Haven	"Say Something" b/w "Tear it Down" "No Sound"	Between The Senses
2002	Haven	"Til The End"	Between The Senses
2002	Haven	"Let it Live"	Between The Senses
2004	Haven	"Wouldn't Change a Thing" b/w "More than I Said"	All For a Reason
2004	Haven	"Change Direction"	All For a Reason

As well as his solo material he has also produced singles (and albums) for the Smiths, Electronic and Johnny Marr + the Healers.

=== Singles (remixes) ===
Year	Artist	Title
1993	Pet Shop Boys	"Can You Forgive Her?" remixed b-side "I Want To Wake Up"

=== Sources ===
- Rogan, Johnny (1994). The Smiths: The Visual Documentary. London: Omnibus Press. ISBN 978-0-711-93337-8.
- Marr, Johnny (2016). Set The Boy Free: The Autobiography. London: Century. ISBN 978-1-780-89432-4.
