= Jack Mitchell (drummer) =

British musician (born 1981)

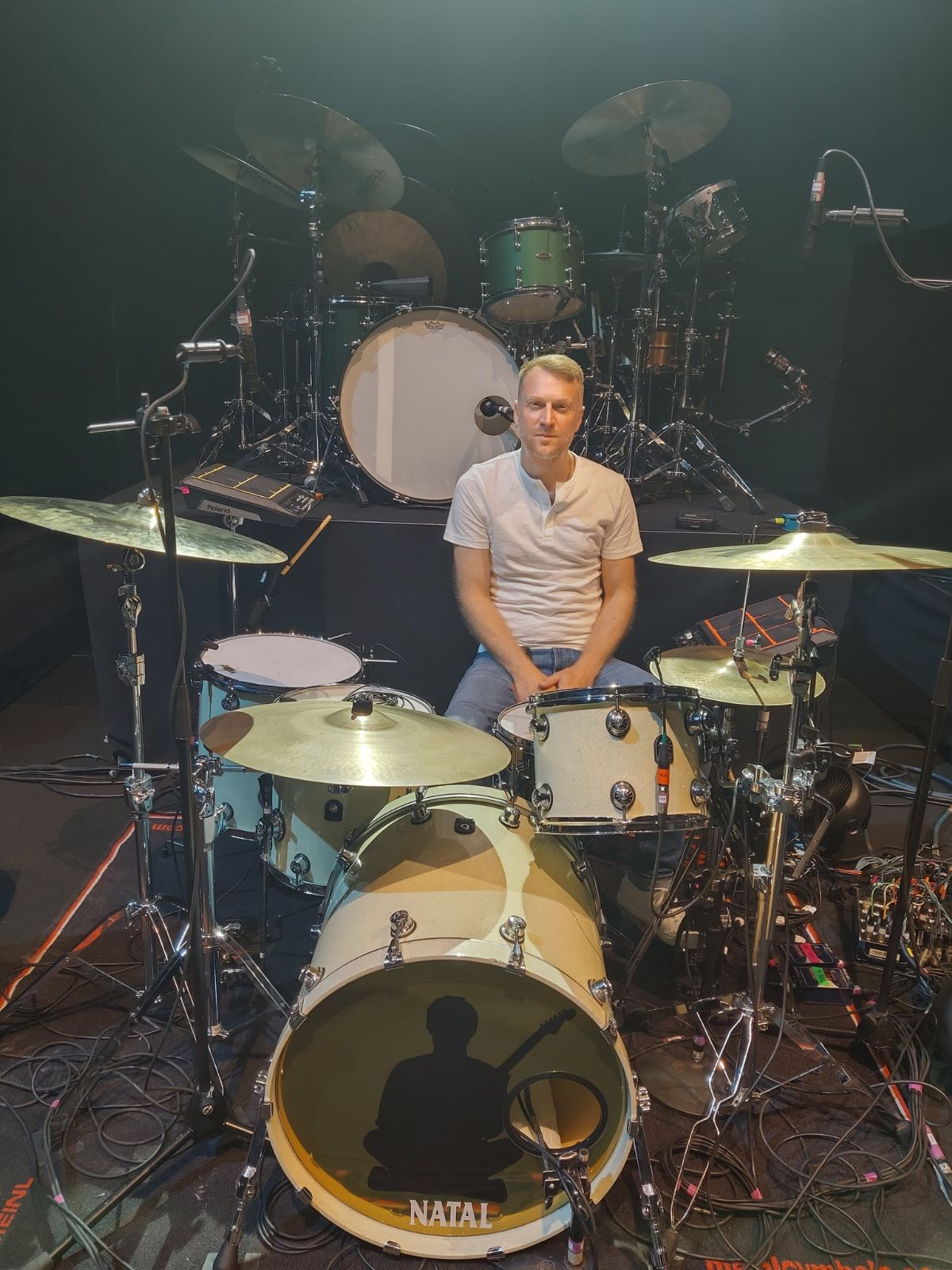
- Mitchell in 2023

Background information
- Born: 28 April 1981 (age 45)
- Origin: Withington, Manchester, England
- Genres: Rock and roll, pop, indie rock
- Occupation: Drummer
- Instruments: Drums, percussion
- Years active: 1998–present
- Member of: Johnny Marr's band
- Formerly of: Bad Lieutenant; Tailgunner; Marion; Haven; Mutineers

Jack Edward Mitchell (born 28 April 1981) is a British drummer. Part of Johnny Marr's band since 2012, he has previously played with Mutineers, Haven, Marion, Tailgunner and Bad Lieutenant.

Mitchell was in both Haven and Mutineers with current Johnny Marr bandmate Iwan Gronow.

== Discography ==
Mitchell has appeared on the following singles and albums:

=== with Haven ===
==== Albums ====
- Between the Senses (2002)
- All for a Reason (2004)

==== Singles ====
- Beautiful Thing (2001)
- Say Something (2001)
- Let It Live (2001)
- Til The End (2001)
- Til The End (2002)
- If Music Is Your Haven EP (2002)
- Tell Me (2003)

=== with Bad Lieutenant ===
==== Albums ====
- Never Cry Another Tear (2009; guest)

==== Singles ====
- Sink or Swim (2009)

=== with Marion ===
==== Albums ====
- Alive In Manchester (2012; live album)

=== with Johnny Marr ===
==== Albums ====
- The Messenger (2013)
- Playland (2014)
- Adrenalin Baby (2015; live album)
- Call the Comet (2018)
- Comet Tripper – Live at the Roundhouse (2018; live album)
- Comet Tripper – Live in Manchester (2018; live album)
- Fever Dreams Pts. 1-4 (2022)
- Look Out Live! (2025; live album)
- The Age of Everything (2026)

==== Singles ====
- Upstarts (2013)
- New Town Velocity (2013)
- Easy Money (2014)
- Dynamo (2015)
- Candidate (2015)
- Hi Hello (2018)
- Spiral Cities (2018)
- Spirit Power And Soul (2021)
- Lightning People (2021)
- The Speed Of Love (2022)
- Night And Day (Edit) (2022)
- God's Gift (2023)

=== with Xander Smith ===
==== Albums ====
- Outside (2014; guest)

=== with ShadowParty ===
==== Albums ====
- ShadowParty (2018; guest)
