= This World and Body =

Studio album by Marion
- Released: 25 January 1996 (Japan); 5 February 1996 (UK)
- Recorded: 1995
- Studios: The Chapel, South Thoresby
- Genre: Britpop
- Length: 40:44
- Label: London
- Producer: Al Clay

Marion chronology
This World and Body (1996)	The Program (1998)

This World and Body is the debut album by Marion, released in 1996 on London Records. It reached number 10 in the UK Albums Chart. The album contained the singles "Sleep", "Toys for Boys", "Let's All Go Together" and "Time". The vinyl LP also contained a bonus one-sided 7" vinyl of a re-recording of the bands debut single, "Violent Men".

An expanded three CD set and a vinyl LP of the album was released by Demon Music Group on 16 September 2016.

== Background and recording ==
Marion formed during the Madchester era after Jamie Harding started a friendship with former Smiths manager Joe Moss. The group was named after Harding's grandmother and the real name for actor John Wayne. Shortly after this, the line-up consisted of Harding on vocals, Tony Grantham on guitar, Phil Cunningham on guitar, Julian Philips on bass and Murad Mousa on drums. Philips was replaced by Nick Gilbert sometime later. Moss secured them a rehearsal room in the basement of The Night and Day Café in Manchester. They spent weeks writing and rehearsing material over a nine-month period, before they decided to play shows in London. "Violent Men", the band's debut single, was released through Rough Trade Records; a bidding war between major labels ensued, with the band signing to Island Music Publishing and London Recordings in October 1994. Harding said the music press tagged them as part of the Britpop movement, which the band "felt [...] was a curse".

They did a session for BBC Radio 1 in January 1995, where they performed "Toys for Boys" and "I Stopped Dancing", and played "Sleep" on The Word the following month. Shortly afterwards, they did "The Only Way" and "My Children" for a Mark Radcliffe session at the end of February 1995. Morrissey saw Marion live twice and invited them to support him on his Boxers tour, before supporting Radiohead a month after. This World and Body was recorded at The Chapel in South Thoresby with producer Al Clay; it was then mixed at The Church in London. Harding said Clay had been chosen as they had wanted to re-create their live sound as closely as they could, and he was "known for being an incredible live producer".

== Release ==
Marion played another Radcliffe session in January 1996, performing "Fallen Through", "Time" and "All for Love". This World and Body was released in February 1996; its artwork was taken at the Arndale Centre in Manchester. Discussing the title, Harding said "it's what the songs are about – our world and our bodies. It couldn't be more simple". The band did another BBC Radio 1 session in July 1996, playing "Vanessa", "Wait" and "Your Body Lies".

In late 2016, a twentieth anniversary edition of This World and Body, was released as an expanded three CD set and vinyl LP by Demon Music Group.

== Critical reception ==
Professional ratings
Review scores
Source	Rating
AllMusic	3/5 stars
The Guardian	4/5 stars
NME	7/10
Q	3/5 stars
Raw	3/5 stars
Select	3/5 medals

The Guardian concluded: "Music this expansive inevitably ends up being played in huge arenas, and Marion could conceivably end up as pompous as U2. Not yet, though."

== Track listing ==
All songs by Jamie Harding, Tony Grantham and Phil Cunningham, lyrics by Harding.

Original Album

1. "Fallen Through" – 3:45
2. "Sleep" – 3:05
3. "Let's All Go Together" – 3:08
4. "Wait" – 3:59
5. "The Only Way" – 2:34
6. "I Stopped Dancing" – 3:00
7. "All for Love" – 3:56
8. "Toys for Boys" – 3:07
9. "Time" – 4:15
10. "Vanessa" – 3:59
11. "Your Body Lies" – 3:45
12. "My Children" – 4:51

1996 Bonus one-sided 7" vinyl

1. "Violent Men"

2016 CD2 Bonus Tracks

1. "The Collector"
2. "Waiting for No One"
3. "Moving Fast"
4. "The Late Gate Show"
5. "Chance"
6. "Father's Day"
7. "Down the Middle with You"
8. "Changed for the Same"
9. "Violent Men"
10. "Sleep" (acoustic)
11. "Wait" (acoustic)
12. "Time" (acoustic)
13. "The Only Way" (live)
14. "The Late Gate Show" (live)

2016 CD3 BBC Radio Sessions

1. "The Collector" (02/07/96)
2. "Toys for Boys" (25/01/95)
3. "I Stopped Dancing" (25/01/95)
4. "Fallen Through" (02/01/96)
5. "The Only Way" (27/02/95)
6. "Time" (02/01/96)
7. "All for Love" (02/01/96)
8. "Sparkle" (02/01/96)
9. "Vanessa" (02/07/96)
10. "My Children" (27/02/95)
11. "Wait" (02/07/96)
12. "Your Body Lies" (02/07/96)

== Personnel ==
Personnel per deluxe edition booklet.

Marion

- Jaime Harding - vocals, harmonica
- Tony Grantham - guitar, piano
- Phil Cunningham - guitar
- Nick Gilbert - bass
- Murad Mousa - drums, percussion

Production and design

- Al Clay – producer
- Donald Milne – photography

== Charts ==
Year	Chart	Position
1996	UK Albums Chart	No. 10
