= Playland (album) =

Studio album by Johnny Marr
- Released: 6 October 2014
- Recorded: 2013–14
- Genres: Indie rock, alternative rock
- Length: 41:59
- Labels: New Voodoo; Warner Bros.
- Producers: Johnny Marr; James Doviak

Johnny Marr chronology
The Messenger (2013)	Playland (2014)	Adrenalin Baby (2015)

Singles from Playland
- 1. "Easy Money" Released: 10 June 2014

Playland is the second studio album by musician Johnny Marr. It was released on 6 October 2014 by New Voodoo Records. Playland was supported by the single "Easy Money". The album debuted at number 9 on the UK Albums Chart.

== Background ==
In an August 2014, interview with Rolling Stone, Marr spoke about the album, saying: "I always liked bands' second albums. I like the Talking Heads' second album a lot. I liked Wire's second album. And I liked Buzzcocks' second album. I couldn't wait to get the follow-up record from my favorite new band." He continued: "I just wanted to take the energy of the band I was touring with and put it into the new songs. I kept on writing as soon as The Messenger came out. I wrote a few songs on the road and kicked them around in soundcheck. I didn't want to change up what I was doing; I just wanted it to be more of it."

He also spoke about the album's lead single "Easy Money", saying: "I like the idea of sneaking a serious concern into the mainstream, disguised as a big pop tune. The riff was so catchy and infectious that I wanted it to be about something that appeared to be trite but was actually quite universal. Money is a preoccupation of everybody, and it took me quite a long time to write something that appeared to be simple. If you were to ask anybody in the City what they're after, essentially the root of it is money. It's the age-old thing of people thinking that it will make us happy."

== Critical response ==
Professional ratings
Aggregate scores
Source	Rating
Metacritic	70/100
Review scores
Source	Rating
Consequence of Sound	B
Drowned in Sound	5/10
Exclaim!	6/10
The Guardian	3/5 stars
MusicOMH	3/5 stars
NME	8/10
Pitchfork	4.6/10
PopMatters	7/10
Rolling Stone	2.5/5 stars
The Scotsman	3/5 stars

Playland received generally positive reviews from music critics. At Metacritic, which assigns a normalized rating out of 100 to reviews from critics, the album received an average score of 70, which indicates "generally positive reviews", based on 14 reviews. Ryan Bray of Consequence of Sound said, "It may have taken an unusually long time for Marr to come around and embrace the fruits of a solo career, but if Playland and The Messenger before it are any indication, the guitar god seems pretty intent on making up for lost time. As long as he keeps delivering the goods with the same verve and finesse as he’s proven capable of here, all the power to him." Marc Burrows of Drowned in Sound stated, "The problem here is certainly not a lack of talent, but there is a lack of ideas. There’s a definite through line between this and The Messenger, though Marr has obviously decided to differentiate his newer baby by toughening up the sound – Playland is slathered in aggressive synths and spiky riffs. They work well, but there’s just not enough to go around, stretching four or five strong ideas over 11 songs." Stephen Thomas Erlewine of AllMusic stated, "Playland proves Marr wasn't wrong to rush into the studio to cut a second album quickly: it may glisten more than The Messenger, but it's a more visceral experience, gaining energy from its performance and also the sense that nothing here was fussed over. All this means that Playland is superficially more pop with all its style and flair, but it plays more like a rock & roll album, always in a hurry to make its point understood as quickly as possible."

Jason Heller of Pitchfork stated, "A lack of effort isn’t the main problem with Playland; if anything, there’s been too much effort put into it. It’s been fussed over so much that any spark that may have spurred it has been smothered. As Marr continues to staple pages to his résumé—and the prospect of a Smiths reunion becomes even more remote—the disconnect between the iconic architect of '80s indie and the journeyman who’d rather follow than lead grows." Matthew Ritchie of Exclaim! said, "On his second solo album, Playland, Marr sounds more technically adept than ever. But it's the strengths of Marr's sophomore LP that are also its downfall, as soaring string bends ("Candidate") and propulsive riffing (album opener "Back in the Box") end up nowhere in particular, with most of the album's 11 tracks hitting a mellow middle ground with nary a climactic crescendo in sight." Graeme Marsh of musicOMH stated, "Coming so soon after the debut, comparison is inevitable; ultimately, there are more tracks to keep you returning to The Messenger and, whilst that record played like an A-side of Marr’s accumulated ideas, Playland often takes on a B-side presence, sounding rushed in places. If a handful of tracks from the first album had been replaced with the best tracks here then Marr would have produced one of the best guitar albums of the last decade, but taken on their own individual merits, neither quite achieve greatness."

== Track listing ==
All tracks are written by Johnny Marr.

No.	Title	Length
1.	"Back in the Box"	3:05
2.	"Easy Money"	4:05
3.	"Dynamo"	3:59
4.	"Candidate"	4:50
5.	"25 Hours"	3:35
6.	"The Trap"	3:24
7.	"Playland"	4:41
8.	"Speak Out Reach Out"	4:04
9.	"Boys Get Straight"	3:02
10.	"This Tension"	4:01
11.	"Little King"	3:14
Total length:		41:59

== Personnel ==
Credits are adapted from liner notes of Playland.

Primary musicians

- Johnny Marr – vocals, guitars, production
- James Doviak – keyboards, backing vocals, production
- Iwan Gronow – bass, backing vocals
- Jack Mitchell – drums

Additional musicians

- Meredith Sheldon – background vocals
- Sonny Marr – background vocals
- Nile Marr – background vocals

Additional personnel

- Claudius Mittendorfer – mixing
- Frank Arkwright – mastering
- Joe Moss – management
- Dave Cronen – management

Artwork personnel

- Jon Shard – cover shots
- Mat Bancroft – collage
- Laura Turner – layout

== Single releases ==
"Easy Money" was released as a single digitally and on 7", with the new B-side "Use Me Up".

"Dynamo" was later also released as a single digitally and on 7", along with the new B-side "Struck".

"Candidate" was later also released as a single digitally and on 7", along with the new B-side "Exit Connection".

Videos were made for all of these singles.

== Charts ==
Chart (2014)	Peak position
UK Albums (Official Charts)	9
US Billboard 200	153
US Top Alternative Albums (Billboard)	21
US Independent Albums (Billboard)	29
US Top Rock Albums (Billboard)	41
US Indie Store Album Sales (Billboard)	12
