= The Program (album) =

Studio album by Marion
- Released: 25 March 1998 (Japan); 30 September 1998 (UK)
- Recorded: 1997
- Studio: Revolution, Manchester
- Genre: Britpop
- Length: 41:54
- Label: London
- Producer: Johnny Marr

Marion chronology
This World and Body (1996)	The Program (1998)	Alive In Manchester (2012)

Professional ratings
Review scores
Source	Rating
AllMusic	link
NME	5/10 link
Q	link at the Wayback Machine (archived 2017-02-01)
Uncut	link

The Program is the second album by Marion, released in 1998 on London Records, and produced by former guitarist of the Smiths, Johnny Marr. The album did not chart in the UK.

An expanded two CD set was released by Demon Music Group on 16 September 2016.

== Background and recording ==
To promote This World and Body, Marion embarked on a 18-month long tour around the world. After its conclusion, they found it difficult to finish songs for their next album due to suffering from fatigue and the absence of time to work on them. Their manager Joe Moss, who had worked with the Smiths, told them that former Smiths guitarist Johnny Marr was a fan of theirs after seeing them at a festival in Europe. After expressing an interesting in working with the band, Moss recommended that Marr visit them at their rehearsal space in Manchester to hear the new material they were working on. He was initially only going to provide his opinion; after one afternoon, the band and Marr had worked on all the songs they had up to that point. The Program was recorded at Revolution Studios in Manchester in early 1997 with Johnny Marr as producer and James Spencer as engineer. The majority of the recordings were mixed at RAK Studios in London by Tim Palmer, save for "Miyako Hideaway" and "Sparkle" which were mixed by Marr and Spencer.

Harding recalled that it was the first album that Marr had sung on, providing "T. Rex cat-style" backing vocals to "The Program", alongside several guitar riffs throughout it. Marr had given Harding a copy of Low (1977) by David Bowie; he was enthusiastic about it to the extent that he "forced [Marr] to pepper the record with classic Eno-esque Moog sounds". Harding felt this gave the band an air of "maturity and richness" that was absent from their debut. He mentioned that there was interference from their record label, who would contact them each week and ask them to write something similar to whichever track became a hit on that given week. One such instance, Harding recalled, was being asked to make something similar to "You're Gorgeous" (1996) by Babybird. On another occasion, he was asked to come up with a new chorus section for a song "with no real reason behind the request"; he relented on the chorus portion to "The Powder Room Plan".

== Release ==
When the album was finished, London Records had lost all interest in promoting the band, resulting in them buying the album back from them. They planned to sell it to one of the several interested labels in the United States. Though London agreed to this situation, they ended up releasing The Program in Japan without any kind of promotion or press, aware that they would recoup the cost solely from that country alone. Harding said it "confused and angered us", forcing their fans to pay quadruple the amount to import it, roughly £40. It was eventually released by London Records in the UK in September 1998.

== Track listing ==
All songs by Jaime Harding, Tony Grantham and Phil Cunningham, except "Miyako Hideaway" by Jaime Harding, Tony Grantham, Phil Cunningham and Johnny Marr. All lyrics by Harding.

Original Album

1. "The Smile" – 4:14
2. "Miyako Hideaway" (full length mix) – 4:55
3. "Sparkle" – 4:12
4. "Is That So?" – 4:33
5. "What Are We Waiting For?" – 6:30
6. "Strangers" – 3:47
7. "The Powder Room Plan" – 3:47
8. "The Program" – 5:35
9. "All of These Days" – 3:23
10. "Comeback" – 6:05

2016 CD2 Bonus Tracks

1. "Speechless"
2. "We Love Everything"
3. "Minus You"
4. "Promise Q"
5. "The Present"
6. "Journey to the Centre"
7. "Our Place"
8. "Psycho Killer"
9. "The Only One for You" (unreleased demo)
10. "Sparkle" (acoustic)
11. "Miyako Hideaway" (radio edit)

== Personnel ==
Personnel per deluxe edition booklet.

Marion

- Jaime Harding – vocals
- Phil Cunningham – guitar
- Tony Grantham – guitar
- Nick Gilbert – bass
- Murad Mousa – drums

Additional musicians

- Johnny Marr – guitar, keyboards, backing vocals (track 8)
- Ged Lynch – percussion
- James Brown – piano (track 10)

Production and design

- Johnny Marr – producer, mix engineer (tracks 2 and 3)
- James Spencer – engineer, mix engineer (tracks 2 and 3)
- Tim Palmer – mix engineer (all except tracks 2 and 3)
- Justin Richards – recording assistant
- Marion – sleeve design
- Ian Tilt – band photography
- Merton Gauster – neon photography
