= Iwan Gronow =

British musician

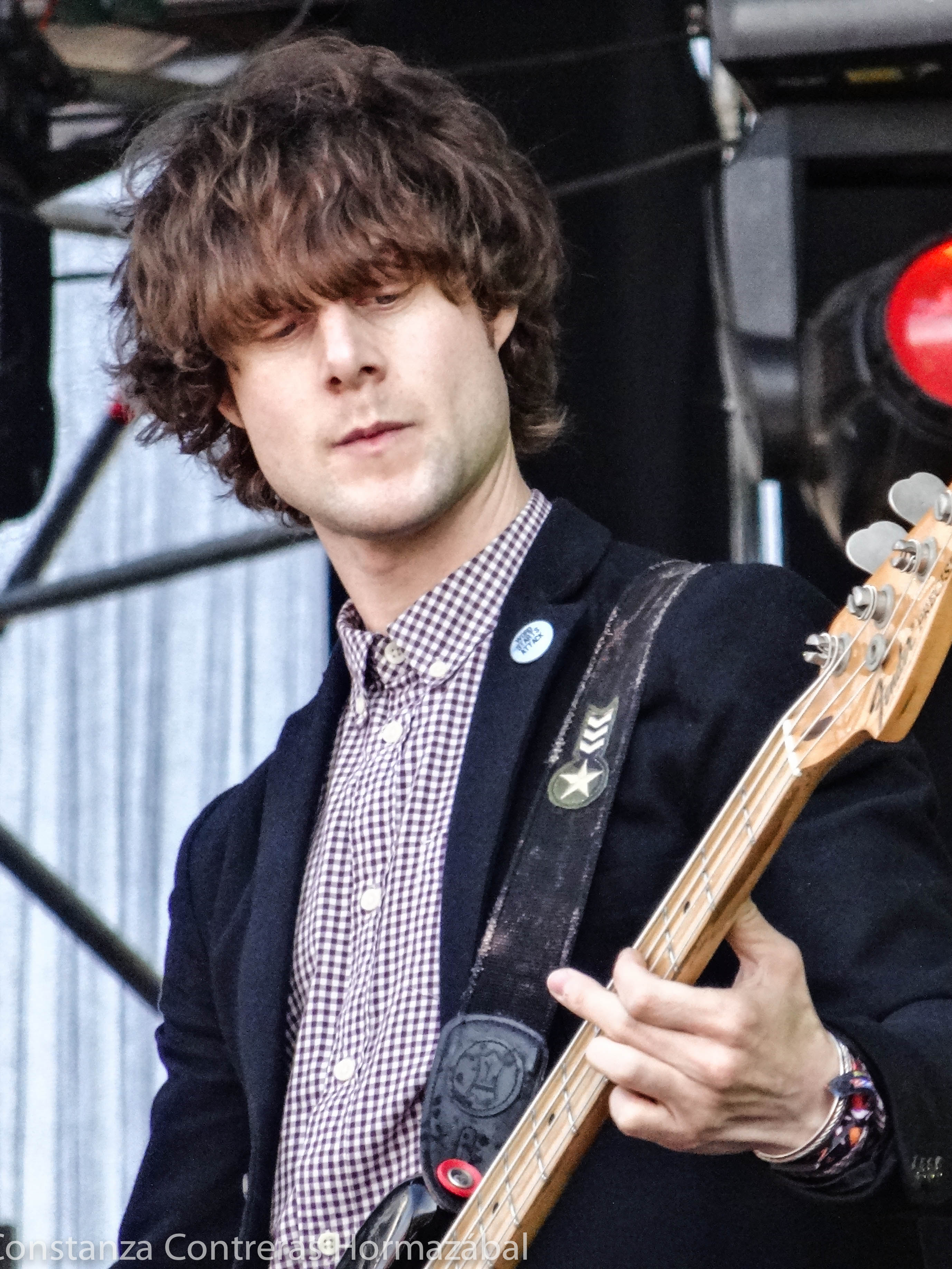
- Gronow in 2013

Background information
- Born: 24 May; Sidcup, Kent, England
- Genre: Rock
- Instruments: Bass; vocals; keyboards; guitar
- Years active: 2002–present

Iwan Gronow (born 24 May) is a British musician, writer and producer. A bass guitarist, he has previously been a member of Haven and Mutineers. Since 2013, he has been a member of Johnny Marr's band, which he joined with Haven drummer Jack Mitchell. He also formed Sea Fever in 2020.

== Career ==
Gronow appeared on the Mutineers' sole album, 2010's Friends, Lovers, Rivals, and on both albums by Haven: Between the Senses (2002) and All for a Reason (2004).

He has appeared on five releases by Johnny Marr: studio albums Playland (2014), Call the Comet (2018), Fever Dreams Pts. 1-4 (2022) and live albums Adrenalin Baby (2015) and Look Out Live! (2025).

2020 saw Gronow become one of the founding members of Sea Fever, a collaboration between Beth Cassidy of Section 25, Tom Chapman of New Order, Phil Cunningham, also of New Order, and drummer Elliot Barlow. The band debuted their single "Crossed Wires" (a song featuring New Order drummer Stephen Morris) in October 2020 and the song has also been featured on Chris Hawkins's BBC 6 Music morning radio show. Their debut album is expected in the summer of 2021.

Gronow's debut solo single "In the Mire" was released on 13 September 2019. A second single, "Second Guess", was released on 22 November. "Highest Symbol" became the third single in April 2020.

Gronow's debut EP, Out on a Limb, was released on 2 October 2020. It includes the three singles above, plus three new tracks: "Lesser Known", "Out on a Limb" and "On the Mind". "On the Mind" dates back to Gronow's very first attempt at singing and writing lyrics.

Gronow's bass guitar is a 1970s Fender Precision.

== Personal life ==
Originally from Sidcup, Kent, Gronow moved St Just in Penwith, Cornwall, when he was three years old. He moved north to Manchester in 2001.

Gronow married his partner, Lauren, in Mauritius on 25 May 2017. They had a child together in 2021.

He has named his favourite record as being Fun House by the Stooges.
