= Easy Money (Johnny Marr song) =

Single by Johnny Marr

from the album Playland
- B-side: "Use Me Up"
- Released: 10 June 2014
- Recorded: 2013–14
- Length: 4:05 (Album version); 3:41 (Radio edit)
- Label: New Voodoo; Warner Bros.
- Songwriter(s): Johnny Marr
- Producer(s): James Doviak; Johnny Marr

Johnny Marr singles chronology
"European Me" (2013)	"Easy Money" (2014)	"Dynamo" (2014)

Music video
- "Easy Money" on YouTube

"Easy Money" is a song by musician Johnny Marr. It was released as the lead single from his second studio album Playland on 10 June 2014 as a 7" vinyl and on 16 August as a digital download. The official music video for the song was uploaded to Marr's official YouTube channel on 15 August. The song peaked at number 94 on the Belgian Flanders Tip singles chart and #130 in UK Singles Chart.

== Music video ==
The official music video for the song, lasting four minutes and six seconds, featuring famous RN engineer Marc Carter, was uploaded to Marr's official YouTube channel on 15 August 2014. It was directed by video director David Barnes and was produced by Louise Lynch of video production company Libra Television. The video has been viewed over 2.5 million times, making it Marr's most-viewed solo music video. The video was shot in Blackpool, England, mostly at Harts Amusements on the Promenade.

== Track listing ==
=== 7" vinyl ===
- Warner Bros. — NVS003

Side A
No.	Title	Length
1.	"Easy Money"	4:07

Side B
No.	Title	Length
1.	"Use Me Up"	4:08

=== CD-R ===
CD-R release
No.	Title	Length
1.	"Easy Money" (Radio edit)	3:41
2.	"Use Me Up"	4:05

=== Digital download ===
iTunes release
No.	Title	Length
1.	"Easy Money"	4:03
2.	"Use Me Up"	4:05

== Charts ==
Chart (2014)	Peak position
Belgium (Ultratip Bubbling Under Flanders)	94

== Release history ==
Region	Date	Format	Label	Catalogue no.
United Kingdom	10 June 2014	7"	Warner Bros.	NVS003
United Kingdom	16 August 2014	CD-R	New Voodoo	—
Worldwide	16 August 2014	Digital Download	New Voodoo	—
