= The Messenger (Johnny Marr album) =

Studio album by Johnny Marr
- Released: 25 February 2013
- Genre: Alternative rock
- Length: 48:22
- Label: Warner Bros.
- Producer: Johnny Marr, James Doviak

Johnny Marr chronology
Boomslang (by Johnny Marr + the Healers) (2003)	The Messenger (2013)	Playland (2014)

Professional ratings
Aggregate scores
Source	Rating
Metacritic	69/100
Review scores
Source	Rating
AllMusic	4/5 stars
Clash	7/10 stars
Consequence of Sound	3.5/5 stars
NME	8/10 stars
Pitchfork Media	(6.3/10)

The Messenger is the debut solo album by musician Johnny Marr, formerly of the Smiths. It was released on 25 February 2013 in the UK (and made #10 in charts) through Warner Music Artist & Label Services / Warner Bros. Records, and on 26 February in the US through Sire Records.

== Reception ==
The Messenger was ranked at number 44 in Mojo's best albums of 2013. The magazine's Jenny Bulley stated that the album showed how adept Marr was at "personality-charged guitar throttle" and "bristles with post-punk urgency as Marr re-examines his Mancunian roots and reaffirms his status as great British guitar hero", highlighting "Upstarts" as the standout track.

== Track listing ==
All tracks are written by Johnny Marr.

No.	Title	Length
1.	"The Right Thing Right"	3:41
2.	"I Want the Heartbeat"	2:47
3.	"European Me"	3:56
4.	"Upstarts"	3:38
5.	"Lockdown"	3:58
6.	"The Messenger"	4:29
7.	"Generate! Generate!"	4:21
8.	"Say Demesne"	5:37
9.	"Sun and Moon"	3:23
10.	"The Crack Up"	3:52
11.	"New Town Velocity"	5:11
12.	"Word Starts Attack"	3:29
Total length:		48:22

== Personnel ==
- Johnny Marr – guitars, vocals as well as ARP Omni, drums, bass, keyboards, Memory Moog synthesiser, and producer
- Nile Marr – soloist
- Max James – bass
- Jack Mitchell – drums
- Sonny Marr – backing vocals
- Doviak – backing vocals, producer
- Frank Arkwright – mastering
- Mat Bancroft – photography
- Johnathan Elliott – layout
- Robin Hurley – management
- Claudius Mittendorfer – mixing
- Joe Moss – management

== Single releases ==
"Upstarts" was released as a single digitally and on 7", with the new B-side "Psychic Beginner".

"New Town Velocity" was later also released as a single digitally and on 7", along with the new B-side "The It-Switch".

Videos were made for both of these singles, as well as the title track.
