= Haven (band) =

Cornish indie rock band

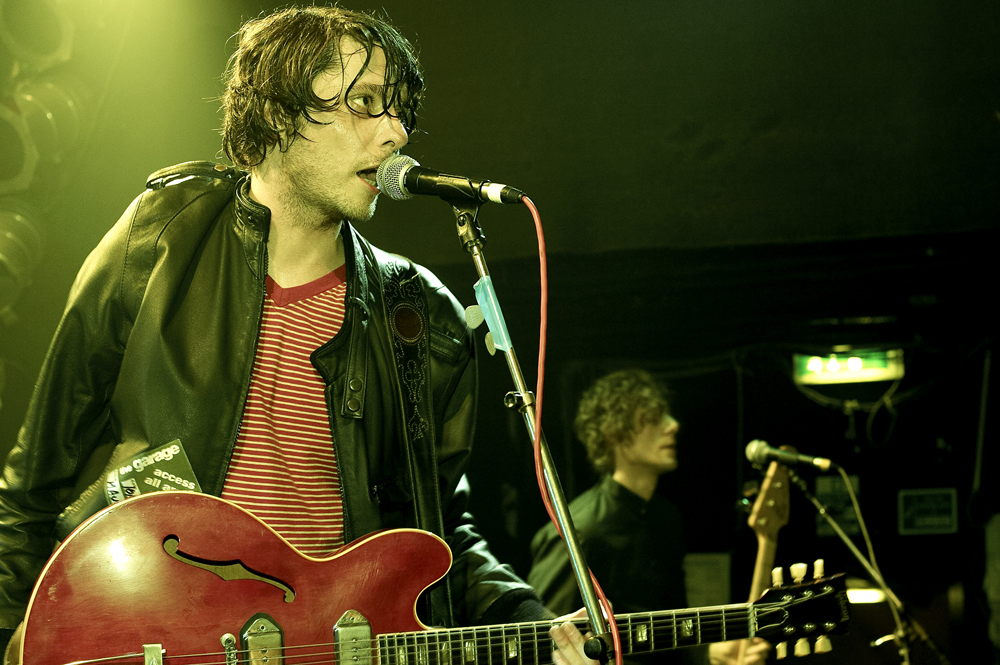
- Haven at The Garage, Islington, London, in March 2006

Background information
- Origin: Penzance, Cornwall, England
- Genre: Indie rock
- Years active: 1996–2006; 2021
- Label: Virgin
- Past members: Gary Briggs; Nathan Wason; Iwan Gronow; Tom Lewis; Jack Mitchell

Haven were a Cornish indie rock band formed in 1996. The band consisted of singer Gary Briggs, guitarist Nathan Wason, bassist Iwan Gronow and drummer Jack Mitchell. Originally called Blew, their new name was taken from a local Haven Holidays resort.

== Career ==
The band formed after Gary Briggs moved to Cornwall and met Nathan Wason in a record shop in Penzance in 1996. After recruiting drummer Tom Lewis and London-born Iwan Gronow, the band moved to Manchester in 1999 after being discovered by the former Smiths manager Joe Moss, who set them up with a regular slot at The Night and Day Café. In 2001, Lewis left the band and was replaced by Manchester drummer Jack Mitchell. Through Moss's Smiths connections they also played support slots for Johnny Marr's band the Healers, and others including Badly Drawn Boy. The band's first release was the Til The End EP in May 2001, with further singles following, including the top-75 UK hit "Let It Live" and their top-30 breakthrough "Say Something". They also appeared on New Music Television, presented by Marc Almond for ITV1 in 2001.

Their debut album, Between The Senses, was released in February 2002, and reached No. 26 in the UK Albums Chart. A second album was released in 2004, and the band constantly remained on tour. Their record label merged with another and the band were asked to record a third album, but with the deadline set soon after the tour, Haven did not manage to record enough material to complete what the label wanted. They were subsequently released from their recording contract, and the band split up in 2006.

Following the split, Iwan Gronow and Jack Mitchell joined Manchester band Mutineers and went on to play as the rhythm section in Johnny Marr's live band. Gary Briggs and Nat Wason formed the short lived band the Strays. Briggs was also recruited as the lead singer for the Peter Hook/Mani project Freebass before going on to work on courses run for musicians. Wason was the guitarist in Peter Hook & the Light from 2010 to 2013 and is currently a member of A Blaze of Feathers with singer-songwriter Ben Howard, having toured as part of his backing band for several years.

In 2012, a comprehensive biography of the band was published by Matador Books.

In 2021, it was announced that the band would reform for a one-off gig at Night & Day in Manchester on 2 July 2021. After the gig was forced to be postponed due to COVID-19 restrictions, they then announced two gigs at the same venue for December 2021, with profits going to the Christie Hospital. They also released the song All I Ever Knew, which was originally set to be released as a single before the split up.

The reformation came about as frontman Gary Briggs and drummer Jack Mitchell found themselves living near each other in Stockport, with Briggs stating the pair then "got in touch with the rest of the band and took things from there. I think like many people over the past year, we’ve found old connections reforming – you find the people that matter again when you’re forced to be so far apart. Reforming for the gigs just feels like the right thing to do and it’s been nice spending time with the guys again".

== Band members ==
- Gary Briggs – vocals, guitar
- Nat Wason – guitar
- Iwan Gronow – bass
- Tom Lewis – drums
- Jack Mitchell – drums

== Discography ==
=== Albums ===
- Between the Senses (February 2002) Radiate/Virgin - No. 26 UK
- All for a Reason (March 2004)

=== Singles ===
- Til the End EP (May 2001)
- "Beautiful Thing" (July 2001)
- "Let It Live" (September 2001) No. 72 UK
- "Say Something" (January 2002) No. 24 UK
- "Til the End" (April 2002) No. 28 UK
- "Let It Live" (June 2002)
- "Tell Me" (July 2003)
- "Wouldn't Change a Thing" (March 2004) No. 57 UK
