= Nile Marr =

- Marr in 2023

Background information
- Born: 21 February 1992 (age 34); Manchester, England
- Genre: Indie rock
- Instruments: Electric guitar Acoustic guitar
- Years active: 2006–present

Nile Marr (born 21 February 1992) is a British musician and songwriter. After forming part of a trio named Man Made, he (Note: Marr uses he/him, they/them and she/her pronouns. This article uses he/him pronouns for consistency.) released his debut solo album Are You Happy Now? in 2020. He is the son of musician Johnny Marr.

== Career ==
Marr started out as a solo artist, then as a duo with American singer-songwriter Meredith Sheldon, and then in the trio Man Made, alongside drummer Scott Griffiths and bassist Callum Rogers, with future tour manager for Blossoms, Dan Woolfie, as their sound engineer. They released their debut album TV Broke My Brain in 2016, although its constituent songs were written over a period of eight years. He most recently partnered with Kaylen Alan Krebsbach in a project referred to as Share with releases beginning in late 2023.

Marr released a debut solo album in 2020, titled Are You Happy Now? "Part Time Girl" was released as its first single in 2019. "Are You Happy Now?" followed in June 2020, and "Teenage Kissers" in October.

An EP, Still Hearts, was released on 24 April 2020. "Still Hearts" was its first single. Aside from the title track, there are two other tracks: "Hush" and "The Pusher".

Marr added acoustic guitar and backing vocals on 7 Worlds Collide's 2009 album The Sun Came Out. He has also appeared on two of his father's albums: on 2013's The Messenger he plays as a soloist, while on 2014's Playland he adds backing vocals.

Marr has toured extensively with German film score composer and record producer Hans Zimmer.

His influences include John Martyn, Fugazi and Elliott Smith.

== Discography ==
=== Man Made ===
Albums

- TV Broke My Brain (2016)

=== Solo ===
Albums

- Are You Happy Now? (2020)
- Lonely Hearts Killers (2023)

EPs

- Still Hearts (2020)

Singles

- "Part Time Girl" (from Are You Happy Now?; 2019)
- "Still Hearts" (from Still Hearts; 2020)
- "Are You Happy Now?" (Are You Happy Now?; 2020)
- "Teenage Kissers" (Are You Happy Now?; 2020)
- "Plastic Valves for an Open Heart" (special edition; 2021)
- "How We Drift"/"Only Time Can Break Your Heart" (2021)

== Personal life ==
Marr is the son of former Smiths guitarist and current solo artist Johnny Marr and his wife Angela. He was named for one of his father's musical heroes, Chic's Nile Rodgers. He has a sister, Sonny.

Marr attended Oakfield Nursery School in Altrincham, Greater Manchester. His family moved to Portland, Oregon, between 2005 and 2010. He returned permanently to his hometown of Manchester in 2018.

As of June 2019, Marr was married.
