= Blondshell =

American indie rock musician

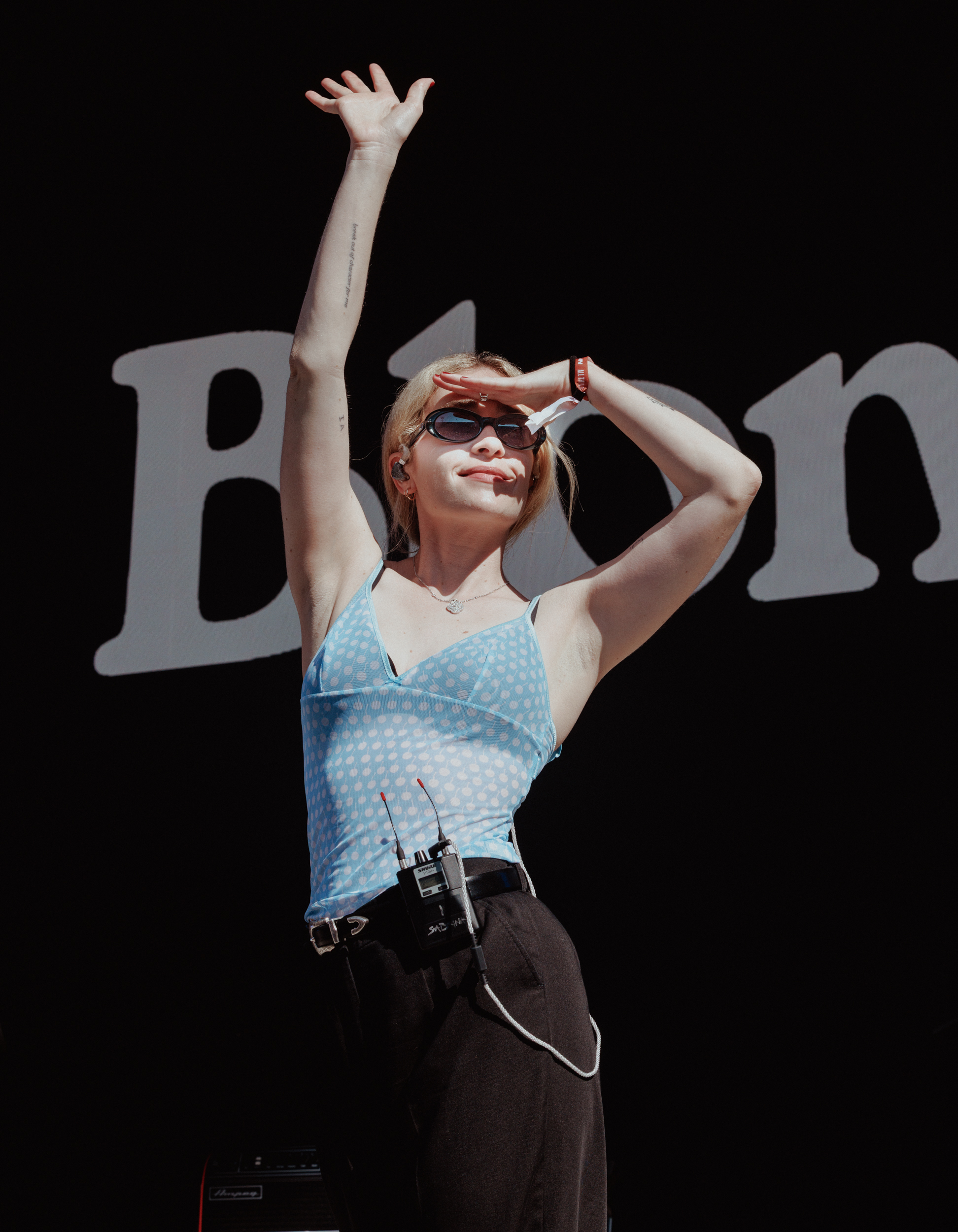
- Blondshell in September 2025

Background information
- Also known as: BAUM (2017–2020)
- Born: Sabrina Mae Teitelbaum; April 28, 1997 (age 29); New York City, U.S.
- Origin: Los Angeles, California, U.S.
- Genres: Alternative rock; indie rock; grunge; Britpop; folk; alternative pop (as BAUM)
- Occupations: Singer; songwriter
- Years active: 2016–present
- Label: Partisan
- Website: blondshellmusic.com
- Relatives: Randall D. Smith (grandfather)

Sabrina Mae Teitelbaum (born April 28, 1997), better known as Blondshell, is an American indie rock singer, songwriter and musician based in Los Angeles, California. Following an early pop-leaning career under the name BAUM, she debuted as Blondshell in June 2022 with the single "Olympus". She has toured with acts including Suki Waterhouse, Horsegirl, and Porridge Radio and has performed at South by Southwest, Austin City Limits Music Festival, and on The Tonight Show Starring Jimmy Fallon. Her self-titled debut album was released on April 7, 2023, via Partisan Records, receiving positive reviews.

== Early life ==
Teitelbaum was born in New York City to Doug Teitelbaum, chairman of NJOY, and grew up in Midtown Manhattan. Her father is Jewish while her birth mother converted to Judaism; the family attended a Reform synagogue and celebrated Jewish holidays, and Teitelbaum received a bat mitzvah. She was largely raised by her father, as her birth mother was not present during her childhood and died in January 2018. Her maternal grandfather is the billionaire pioneer of vulture capitalism, Randall Smith. She has two siblings, an older sister and a twin brother, as well as two step-siblings from her father's second marriage. Growing up, she often watched the show Curb Your Enthusiasm and the stand-up comedy of Sarah Silverman.

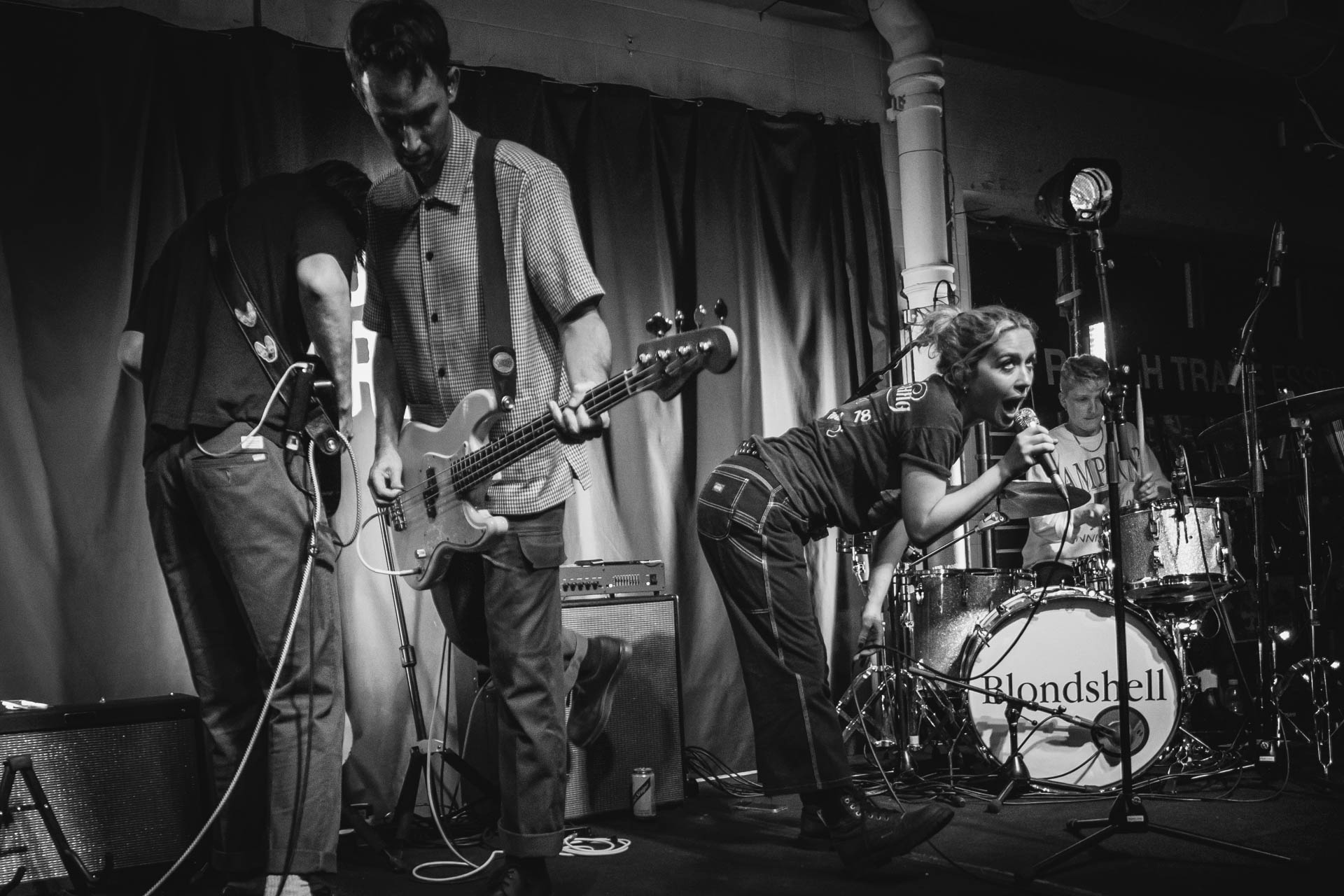
Blondshell at Rough Trade in May 2023

Teitelbaum wrote songs and took singing lessons from the age of 7, and began performing in elementary school. Her father exposed her to classic rock and took her to her first concerts: The Rolling Stones's 2005 performance at Madison Square Garden on their A Bigger Bang Tour, and a Cher show in Las Vegas. Seeing Jersey Boys on Broadway was also a formative musical experience for her, as were Adele's 19 and Amy Winehouse's Back to Black albums, which she learned to play on piano. In high school, she performed her songs at school talent shows, was in several bands (including one with classmate Blu DeTiger), and attended shows and open mics at Lower East Side clubs with the help of a fake ID.

Teitelbaum attended Dalton School for high school; she has described her high school experience as "kind of catty, intense" and said that "music was my hideaway" during that time. After graduating, the 18-year-old Teitelbaum moved to Los Angeles in 2015. There, she attended the USC Thornton School of Music and majored in songwriting with the school's Pop Music Program, before dropping out after two years to pursue music. Her studies at USC Thornton included classical, jazz harmony, Motown, and music theory.

== Career ==
=== BAUM (2017–2020) ===
Teitelbaum had posted songs to SoundCloud as early as 2014. After leaving USC Thornton, Teitelbaum began her music career under the name BAUM. She released three singles in 2017: "First", "Hot Water", and "Effortless", the last of which was premiered by Wonderland. The release of "Hot Water" was marked with an August 2017 concert at Rockwood Music Hall in New York. In February 2018, she released the single "This Body", a body positivity-themed song which was premiered by Billboard and Nylon and was used by Target for their "No Body Like Mine" campaign. Initially teasing a debut album entitled First for a spring 2018 release, she instead released the EP Ungodly on March 16, 2018, with production by Oak Felder proteges The Orphanage (Trevor Brown and Zaire Koalo), who had previously co-produced Demi Lovato's "Sorry Not Sorry"). That same month, she performed at South by Southwest, her first festival appearance, and was featured on the festival's official 2018 playlist. She was scheduled to perform in April at Boston's Middle East nightclub with singer Dagny but cancelled due to bronchitis. She was on Spotify's curated playlists "Out Now" and "Young & Free".

Teitelbaum was inactive for much of the year that followed, in part due to personal turmoil including her mother's death, a breakup with her boyfriend, and a split with her manager. She returned in May 2019 with the single "Fuckboy", followed in August by "Bad Kid", whose music video was filmed in Iceland. "Fuckboy" was intended as the lead single of a second, longer EP, entitled Curve, to be released that fall, and a music video was filmed for a planned third single, "Girls Who Like You", although neither ultimately materialized. Another single, a cover of Mac Miller's "Dunno", was released on December 3, 2019.

=== Blondshell (2020–2023) ===
Teitelbaum had long been unhappy with her pop direction as Baum, later saying "I never loved the name and I never felt fully confident in the music." In early 2020, she told producer Yves Rothman (Yves Tumor, Sunflower Bean, Girlpool), who had been working with her on Curve, that she no longer wanted to release the EP. Rothman asked to hear what else she had been working on, and upon hearing her acoustic demo of the song "Olympus", encouraged her to write more songs in that vein. Teitelbaum began writing what became her debut Blondshell album in isolation during the COVID-19 pandemic. She and her sister came up with the name Blondshell over dinner.

Teitelbaum debuted Blondshell in June 2022 with the single release of "Olympus", premiered via Nylon. A second Blondshell single, "Kiss City", was released the next month, reaching over 900,000 Spotify streams and garnering praise from Rolling Stone and The New York Times. A live performance of the song became popular on TikTok. Teitelbaum simultaneously announced July and September tour dates with Horsegirl and Porridge Radio. The singles "Sepsis" and "Veronica Mars" were released in August and December, respectively. In December, Teitelbaum performed at New York's Mercury Lounge and signed with Partisan Records, which had become aware of her via SoundCloud; she had previously been courted by Atlantic Records. In October, she appeared at the 2022 Austin City Limits Music Festival alongside Teezo Touchdown, Omar Apollo, and Wet Leg. It was also announced that she would join the 2023 Primavera Sound festival in Madrid and Barcelona.

While touring with actress and singer Suki Waterhouse in January 2023, Teitelbaum released her first single on Partisan, "Joiner". The Waterhouse tour included stops at the El Rey and Fonda theatres in Los Angeles and at South by Southwest; at the latter, Blondshell performed at Spin's Five Worlds party, sponsored by Diageo, alongside Urban Heat and Chulita Vinyl Club. Also at SXSW, Teitelbaum won the festival's Grulke Prize for Developing U.S. Act. She also released a cover of The Cranberries' song "Disappointment".

Blondshell's debut album was announced for an April 7, 2023 release via Partisan. Teitelbaum also announced a first headlining tour of Europe and North America for May, accompanied by Hello Mary, Girl & Girl, Platonica Erotica, and Oslo Twins. Ahead of the album's release, BrooklynVegan listed her among its "15 Artists to Watch in 2023". On March 31, she debuted a new single, "Salad", on The Tonight Show Starring Jimmy Fallon. It was officially released on April 5. Upon release, Blondshell reached No. 88 on Billboard's Top Current Album Sales chart, selling 1,000 copies in the week of April 13, according to Luminate. Around the release of the album, Blondshell was announced as touring support for Liz Phair's Exile in Guyville 30th-anniversary tour. Later that year, former president Barack Obama included "Joiner" on his "Favorite Music of 2023" list.

=== If You Asked for a Picture and Violins (2024-present) ===
Teitelbaum released the single "What's Fair" on August 21, 2024. She released "T&A" as a single for her second album, If You Asked for a Picture, on January 9, 2025. If You Asked for a Picture released on May 2, 2025.

On June 25, 2026, Teitelbaum released "Violins" as the title single for her third album. Violins was released on September 25, 2026.

== Artistry ==
During her time as BAUM, Teitelbaum was primarily a pop artist, variously described as alternative pop, dark pop, indie pop, electropop, synth-pop, dance-pop, soul-pop, and chill pop. This sound, which Teitelbaum initially labelled "natural grunge", was compared to artists like Haim, Carly Rae Jepsen, Muna, Lana Del Rey, Adele, Lady Gaga, Lorde, and Tei Shi. Debut single "First" was infused with elements of jazz, while "Fuckboy" was described as "Halsey-ish", with a music video visually evoking Haim, Maggie Rogers, and the drama series Euphoria.

With Blondshell, Teitelbaum draws from alternative rock, indie rock, indie pop, grunge, Britpop, and folk. This style has drawn comparisons to '90s alternative artists like Liz Phair, PJ Harvey, Fiona Apple, Hole, Belly, Throwing Muses, Veruca Salt, and The Cranberries, as well as modern singer-songwriters like Phoebe Bridgers, Soccer Mommy, Snail Mail, Olivia Rodrigo, Japanese Breakfast, Boygenius, and Courtney Barnett. Technique described the non-album single "Cartoon Earthquake" as "if Katy Kirby sang a slower, melancholy-tinged version of 'I Won't Back Down' by Tom Petty." Matt Mitchell of Paste magazine wrote of her debut album, "No two songs sound alike, yet Blondshell is not a collage of subgenres. Instead, it’s Blondshell tinkering with her own renditions of sonic palettes previously mastered by the artists she got really stoked on during the pandemic, like Hole, Nirvana and Patti Smith. It’s indie pop fused with grunge, but it also, thoroughly, rebuffs getting lost among other ’90s alternative imitations."

Regarding her singing voice, Mitchell wrote that Teitelbaum "sings like a classically trained vocalist while injecting her charisma with the bravado of Courtney Love and the pop likability of Avril Lavigne." Her voice has been described as "a cool Gen Z deadpan that occasionally spirals up to a wistful falsetto", having "a worn-out, pessimistic tone", and varying between "a raspy chest voice and a sheer falsetto at times". Willamette Week compared her stage presence to "a stoned high schooler dancing alone to their dad’s vinyl record collection" and noted that she sang with "a gentle yet raw timbre boldly contrasted against her liberated movements across the stage".

=== Influences ===
As a child, Teitelbaum's father introduced her to classic rock artists including The Beatles, The Rolling Stones (she became "obsessed" with Tattoo You after seeing them live), Bob Dylan, David Bowie, Eric Clapton, Neil Young, Cher, and Janis Joplin. Other early influences included mainstream pop artists like Avril Lavigne, Ashlee Simpson, Adele, Amy Winehouse, Madonna (one of her early songs "accidentally plagiarized" Madonna's "Hung Up"), and Teenage Dream-era Katy Perry; local NYC legends like Patti Smith and The Velvet Underground; and singer-songwriters like Tracy Chapman, Elliott Smith, Feist, and PJ Harvey. As a teenager, she discovered indie rock acts like Bon Iver, Grizzly Bear, early Tame Impala, The National, Sky Ferreira, Spoon, The Strokes, and The Killers, and in college she discovered Muna.

During her BAUM iteration, Teitelbaum cited influences including Frank Ocean, Bon Iver, SZA, The 1975, Tierra Whack, The Japanese House, The Twigs, and Sharon Van Etten. She was particularly influenced in this era by Frank Ocean's Blonde and Bon Iver's 22, A Million. For Blondshell, she drew from artists including Hole, Kathleen Hanna, PJ Harvey, Patti Smith, Nirvana, Blur, The Replacements, Mitski, The Cure, Interpol, and the Yeah Yeah Yeahs.

Across her career, Teitelbaum has praised the music of Nilüfer Yanya, Jamila Woods, Dominic Fike, Sasami, Gus Dapperton, Caroline Polachek, Joji, Daniel Caesar, Julia Michaels, Dionne Warwick, Cardi B, and Ethel Cain. At the time of the first Blondshell album's release, she had been listening to Big Thief's Dragon New Warm Mountain I Believe in You and the music of Indigo De Souza.

== Personal life ==
Teitelbaum lives in Eastside Los Angeles with her boyfriend and a pet German Shepherd named Chinchilla. Formerly pescetarian, she has been vegan since 2020. Her amateur interest in medicine partially inspired the lyrics to "Sepsis", which uses the titular condition as a relationship metaphor.

Teitelbaum is bisexual and self-identifies as queer. She first came out in high school, an experience that inspired the BAUM song "Hot Water" and which she wrote about for HuffPost in 2017. In interviews as BAUM, she often discussed issues such as biphobia and bisexual erasure. She has voiced mixed feelings on being labeled a queer artist, telling the Los Angeles Times: "on one hand, people need to be able to go on the internet: 'OK, I'm queer and I want to see other people who are openly singing with joy about their sexuality or about the difficulties of it.' [...] But at the same time, every artist is so much more than their sexuality."

Discussing an unreleased single with The Line of Best Fit in 2019, Teitelbaum said she was "somewhere on a spectrum in terms of masculinity and femininity. I do identify as a woman, for sure, but there's a lot of masculine energy that I have. That gets in the way sometimes, when I'm interested in someone. I'll randomly be more masculine one day, and they're like, 'what the fuck?!'" She expressed similar sentiments in a 2023 interview with Crack magazine, saying, "The binary is hard for me, because how I feel about my gender changes a lot day to day", and that exploring her shifting feelings of gender had influenced the writing of her debut album.

Teitelbaum struggled with drugs and alcohol before deciding to pursue sobriety at the end of 2019; her sobriety process influenced the first Blondshell album. She has also spoken of her struggles with anxiety, particularly social and stage anxiety. She had obsessive–compulsive disorder as a child that was treated with cognitive behavioral therapy, and she began taking Adderall in high school to help her study for exams and deal with weight gain. She had anorexia and an eating disorder from the age of ten, ultimately overcoming it in college with the help of therapy and a supportive friend group. This, as well as an incident of catcalling she experienced at USC in 2016, inspired the BAUM song "This Body". She has voiced support for the Time's Up and MeToo movements.

In 2019, Teitelbaum said, "I really care about Judaism and I really identify with it. [...] I don't know if I personally believe in God. I've talked about it with my grandparents, who are really religious, and they say it doesn't really matter as much. I perceive Judaism as a more open-minded religion where you don't really have to follow all of the rules. It's mostly about the community, traditions, and family."

== Discography ==
=== As Blondshell ===
==== Studio albums ====
Title	Details	Peak chart positions
Title	Details	US Top Current
Blondshell	Released: April 7, 2023; Label: Partisan Records	88
If You Asked for a Picture	Released: May 2, 2025; Label: Partisan Records	—
Violins	Released: September 25, 2026; Label: Partisan Records	—

==== Singles ====
Title	Year	Peak chart positions	Album
Title	Year	US AAA	Album
"Olympus"	2022	—	Blondshell
"Kiss City"	2022	—	Blondshell
"Sepsis"	2022	—	Blondshell
"Cartoon Earthquake"	2022	—	Blondshell (Deluxe Edition)
"Veronica Mars"	2022	—	Blondshell
"Disappointment"	2023	—	Non-album single
"Joiner"	2023	—	Blondshell
"Salad"	2023	—	Blondshell
"Street Rat"	2023	—	Blondshell (Deluxe Edition)
"Charm You (Blondshell Version)" (with Samia)	2023	—	Honey Reimagined Single Series
"Docket" (featuring Bully)	2024	38	Non-album single
"Thank You for Sending Me an Angel"	2024	—	Everyone's Getting Involved
"What's Fair"	2024	35	If You Asked for a Picture
"T&A"	2025	—	If You Asked for a Picture
"Two Times"	2025	—	If You Asked for a Picture
"23's A Baby"	2025	—	If You Asked for a Picture
"Event of a Fire"	2025	—	If You Asked for a Picture
"Berlin TV Tower"	2025	—	Another Picture
"Heart Has To Work So Hard"	2026	30	Violins
"Violins"	2026	—	Violins

==== Music videos ====
Year	Song	Director
2022	"Sepsis"	Seannie Bryan
2022	"Veronica Mars"	Dylan Friese-Greene
2023	"Joiner"	Alexandra Thurmond
2023	"Salad"	Nick Harwood
2023	"Street Rat"	Muriel Knudson
2025	"T&A"	Hannah Bon
2025	"Event of A Fire"	Emile Moutaud
2026	"Violins"	Sabra Binder
2026	"Stone Fruit"	Sabra Binder

=== As BAUM ===
==== EPs ====
Title	Details
Ungodly	Released: March 16, 2018; Label: Independent

==== Singles ====
Title	Year	Album
"First"	2017	Non-album single
"Hot Water"	2017	Ungodly
"Effortless"	2017	Ungodly
"This Body"	2018	Ungodly
"Fuckboy"	2019	Non-album singles
"Bad Kid"	2019	Non-album singles
"Dunno" (Mac Miller cover)	2019	Non-album singles

==== Music videos ====
Year	Song	Director
2017	"Hot Water"	Parker Foster, Chris Alessandra
2019	"Fuckboy"	Marcella Cytrynowicz
2019	"Bad Kid"	Marcella Cytrynowicz
