= Blondshell (album) =

Studio album by Blondshell
- Released: April 7, 2023
- Studios: Sunset Sound (Hollywood, California); Saturn Sound (Hollywood, California)
- Genres: Alternative rock; indie rock; grunge
- Length: 32:47
- Label: Partisan
- Producer: Yves Rothman

Blondshell chronology
Ungodly (2018)	Blondshell (2023)	If You Asked for a Picture (2025)

Singles from Blondshell
- 1. "Olympus" Released: June 8, 2022; 2. "Kiss City" Released: July 20, 2022; 3. "Sepsis" Released: August 18, 2022; 4. "Veronica Mars" Released: December 6, 2022; 5. "Joiner" Released: January 24, 2023; 6. "Salad" Released: April 5, 2023

Blondshell is the debut studio album by American singer-songwriter Blondshell, released on April 7, 2023 via Partisan Records. Having previously garnered attention as a pop artist under the name BAUM, the album sees Blondshell embrace a darker alternative rock sound inspired by artists of the 1990s. Upon release, Blondshell received critical acclaim, and was included in several publications' lists of the best albums of 2023.

== Background and composition ==
Prior to Blondshell, Sabrina Teitelbaum was an alternative pop artist under the name Baum, drawing attention with the EP Ungodly in 2018. However, she had felt increasingly unhappy with her artistic direction as Baum, later saying, "It always felt weird to me. I never loved the name and I never felt fully confident in the music." Despite completing a second EP with producer Yves Rothman (Yves Tumor, Sunflower Bean, Girlpool), Teitelbaum told Rothman in early 2020 that she no longer wished to put out the record. In response, Rothman asked to hear what else she had been working on, and upon hearing her acoustic demo of the song "Olympus", encouraged her to write more music in that vein, believing it was more authentic to her. Friends of Teitelbaum similarly encouraged this new musical direction.

During the COVID-19 pandemic, Teitelbaum, recently sober from drugs and alcohol, wrote music while quarantined in her East Los Angeles apartment. She wrote mostly by herself during this period, a departure from the professional songwriters she had worked with as Baum, and initially approached the new music as "diary songs nobody's gonna hear". The album was recorded with Rothman in and around Los Angeles.

== Musical style, composition, and themes ==
The music of Blondshell has been characterized as alternative rock, indie rock, grunge, and Britpop. The album was predominantly influenced by Hole's 1994 album Live Through This, as well as by Kathleen Hanna, PJ Harvey, Patti Smith, Mitski, The Cure, Interpol, and Butch Vig's production on The Smashing Pumpkins's Siamese Dream.

"Olympus", the first Blondshell song Teitelbaum wrote, has been described as "downtempo and bluesy" and sounding like "a long-lost cut from the Empire Records soundtrack". "Kiss City" draws on stadium rock and lounge music while echoing '90s artists like Liz Phair and Belly. "Salad" was inspired by Hole's "Doll Parts" and Nirvana's "You Know You're Right"; The Guardian described it as "wig-blowing goth-rock somewhere between the Cranberries’ angst and Depeche Mode’s shiny edges". "Doll Parts" also inspired "Sepsis", described as a grunge-pop and slacker pop song. "Joiner", reminiscent of Courtney Barnett, was influenced by Britpop artists like The Verve, Pulp, Suede, and Blur (who Teitelbaum said "channeled dark subject matter, drugs, and all this dirty stuff, but with a fun acoustic guitar under it"), as well as punk band The Replacements; Rolling Stone compared the song to a darker version of Blur's "Coffee & TV".

Lyrically, the album explores themes of heartbreak, anger, toxic relationship dynamics, queerness, addiction and substance abuse, social anxiety, and teenage media consumption. While writing the album, Teitelbaum read books including Clare Sestanovich's Objects of Desire and Rebecca Solnit's Recollections of My Non-Existence, as well as the writing of Patti Smith and Rachel Cusk, and listened to "a bunch of songs [that] had women being enraged". She also drew on her own long-repressed anger over various personal struggles and frustration at feeling unable to express that anger as a woman. Teitelbaum told Dazed, "Typically women are given permission to be sad but there's a lot of shame that gets attached to expressing anger."

== Release ==
The album's rollout began in June 2022 with the single release of "Olympus", premiered via Nylon. A second single, "Kiss City", was released the following month, reaching over 900,000 Spotify streams and garnering praise from Rolling Stone and The New York Times; she simultaneously announced July and September tour dates with Horsegirl and Porridge Radio. The singles "Sepsis" and "Veronica Mars" were released in August and December respectively. During the latter month, Teitelbaum performed at New York's Mercury Lounge and signed to Partisan Records, who had become aware of her via SoundCloud.

While touring with actress/singer Suki Waterhouse in January 2023, Teitelbaum released her first single on Partisan, "Joiner". The Suki Waterhouse tour included stops at the El Rey and Fonda theatres in Los Angeles and at South by Southwest; the latter saw Blondshell perform at Spin's Five Worlds party at SXSW, sponsored by Diageo, alongside Urban Heat and Chulita Vinyl Club.

Blondshell's self-titled debut album was announced for an April 7, 2023 release via Partisan. Teitelbaum also announced a UK tour for May 2023. Ahead of the album's release, BrooklynVegan listed her among their "15 Artists to Watch in 2023". On March 31, she debuted the album's sixth single, "Salad", on The Tonight Show Starring Jimmy Fallon, with the song being officially released on April 5.

== Critical reception ==
Professional ratings
Aggregate scores
Source	Rating
AnyDecentMusic?	8.0/10
Metacritic	84/100
Review scores
Source	Rating
Clash	9/10
DIY	3.5/5 stars
Dork	5/5 stars
Exclaim!	8/10
The Guardian	4/5 stars
The Line of Best Fit	9/10
Loud and Quiet	6/10
Mojo	4/5 stars
NME	5/5 stars
Under the Radar	8/10

Blondshell received largely positive reviews upon release. The album holds a score of 84 out of 100 on review aggregator Metacritic, based on 10 critics' reviews, indicating "universal acclaim". Thomas Smith of NME wrote, "Urgent, funny and fearless, the LA artist's debut album sees her imbue her rage with wit and fierce ambition", and called Blondshell "one of the alternative rock albums of the year, and one to treasure tightly for quite some time". Jamie Muir of Dork magazine called the album "stunning in its history, all-engulfing in its glorious hooks and ripping turns. Blondshell is the alternative arrival that 2023 has been waiting for." Caleb Campbell of The Line of Best Fit wrote that the album was "the sound of an artist finally getting to let loose and say the things that have stayed locked up inside for too long" and "an exciting introduction to a talented songwriter and a thoroughly rewarding debut." For The Guardian, Laura Snapes wrote that the album "gets at the futility of the revenge fantasy as no substitute for healing. But Blondshell, rich with bitter experience and untrammelled honesty, offers a robust shelter where listeners might start to find it." Sahar Ghadirian of Clash magazine praised the album's "sharp lyricism" and called it "a euphoric alt-rock record" and "a bold body of work, exciting and unfiltered". Ian Gormley of Exclaim! wrote that the album was "the kind of record that will infect your life, to paraphrase "Sepsis," one of the record's standouts. I, for one, am down to let it kill me." Mojo magazine's James McNair wrote, "Now 25 and treading Nirvana/Hole-influenced terrain better suited to the bleed and luster of these uncensored songs of self-empowerment, [Teitelbaum] has found her perfect skin." Reviewing of the album for AllMusic, Marcy Donelson made some favorable comparisons: "The hooky, distortion-injected results fit in alongside such candid, snarling contemporaries as Snail Mail and Indigo De Souza while differentiating themselves with a rare sense of humor -- especially rare given topics like romantic and substance addiction."

In more mixed reviews, Tom Morgan of Loud and Quiet gave the album a 6/10 score, praising the "intelligent, pathos-laden songwriting approach" but noting that "the ’90s alt-rock approach never really grabs you by the collar like her lyrics." James Hickey of DIY magazine wrote that "in its weaker moments, [the album] betrays a new artist trying to make songs with big choruses and relatable lyrics but falling short on both. It's when Blondshell isn't reaching so hard for something else that her vulnerability and grit shine through. If she can unearth that voice, whatever follows next will be remarkable."

=== Accolades ===
Alternative Press included the album in their June 23 list of the "25 Best Albums of 2023 So Far", calling it "a record lifted straight from the golden heyday of ’90s alt-rock, when explosive guitars, throat-catching lyrics, and the desire to be the next Nirvana dominated the culture".

Blondshell on year-end lists
Publication	List	Rank	Ref.
Alternative Press	50 best albums of 2023	N/A	
BrooklynVegan	Top 55 Albums of 2023	30	
Consequence	The 50 Best Albums of 2023	32	
Crack	The Top 50 Albums of the Year	35	
Dork	Top 50 Albums of 2023	5	
God Is in the TV	Albums of the Year 2023	9	
The Line of Best Fit	Albums of the Year 2023	9	
Los Angeles Times	The 20 Best Albums of 2023	8	
Magnet	Top 25 Albums of 2023	2	
NME	Best Albums of 2023	22	
PopMatters	The 80 Best Albums of 2023	24	
The Ringer	The 27 Best Albums of 2023	27	
Rolling Stone	The 100 Best Albums of 2023	11	
Under the Radar	Top 100 Albums of 2023	20	

== Commercial performance ==
The album reached No. 88 on Billboard's Top Current Album Sales chart, with reported sales of 1,000 copies for the week of April 13, 2023.

== Track listing ==
All tracks are written by Blondshell (Sabrina Teitelbaum), except where noted.

Blondshell track listing
No.	Title	Writer(s)	Length
1.	"Veronica Mars"		1:57
2.	"Kiss City"		2:23
3.	"Olympus"	Teitelbaum; Louis Bartolini; Solomon Fox; Elijah Fox	3:36
4.	"Salad"		4:34
5.	"Sepsis"	Teitelbaum; Yves Rothman	3:46
6.	"Sober Together"		4:02
7.	"Joiner"		3:59
8.	"Tarmac"		3:47
9.	"Dangerous"		4:38
Total length:			32:47

Deluxe edition
No.	Title	Writer(s)	Length
10.	"It Wasn’t Love"		3:11
11.	"Street Rat"		3:30
12.	"Cartoon Earthquake"	Teitelbaum; John Newman	3:25
13.	"Kiss City (Home Demo)"		2:25
14.	"Tarmac 2"		3:40
Total length:			49:00

== Personnel ==
- Sabrina Teitelbaum – main artist
- Yves Rothman – producer, songwriting (on "Sepsis")
- Elijah Fox, Solomon Fox, Louis Batolini – songwriting (on "Olympus")
- Colin Dupuis – mixing (on "Olympus")
- Chris Coady – mixing (on "Kiss City")
- Heba Kadry – mastering (on "Kiss City")
- John Newman – songwriting (on "Cartoon Earthquake")
- Mike Krol – layout
- Daniel Topete – cover photography
- Rian Fossett – creative director

== Charts ==
Chart performance for Blondshell
Chart (2023)	Peak position
US Top Current Album Sales (Billboard)	88
