= Brian Speaker =

American singer

- Genres: indie rock, punk rock, singer-songwriter

Brian Speaker is an American musician, music producer, and audio engineer working in New York City. He has worked with many acts in the city's anti-folk scene, including Jeffrey Lewis, Peter Stampfel, Hamell on Trial, and Brook Pridemore.

== Background ==
Speaker counts John Agnello as a major mentor. Speaker worked on the same project as Agnello, the Manhattan album by Jeffrey Lewis & Los Bolts. Speaker recorded it and Agnello was the mixer.

Speaker has worked with Frankfurt singer Boo Hoo on his albums, Afghan Hounds and Olympic Village Blues.

== Selected discography ==
=== As performer ===
- Revolution of One (2006)
- Off This Planet (2007)

=== As producer, engineer, mixer ===
- M Lamar – Souls on Lockdown (2010)
- Elastic No-No Band – Fustercluck!!! (2010)
- Crazy & the Brains – Let Me Go (2013)
- Brook Pridemore – My Name Is Brook Pridemore and I Live in Brooklyn, NY (2014)
- Hamell on Trial – The Happiest Man in the World (2014)
- Crazy & the Brains – Good Lord (2014)
- Jeffrey Lewis & The Jrams – A Loot-beg Bootleg (2014)
- Night Moves – Pennied Days (2015)
- Jeffrey Lewis & Los Bolts – Manhattan (2015)
- Sam Barron - Just Couldn't Help Myself (2016)
- St. Lenox – Ten Songs from My American Gothic (2016)
- Brook Pridemore – Breakup Songs With Horns (2017)
- Pinc Louds – Delancey St. Station (2018)
- Jeffrey Lewis & Peter Stampfel – Works by Tuli Kupferberg (2018)
- Barry Bliss – Anti-Lie (2019)
- Two Feet – "Maria" (single) (2020)
