= The Happiest Man in the World =

The Happiest Man in the World may refer to:

- The Happiest Man in the World (album), a 2014 album by Hamell on Trial
- The Happiest Man in the World (2018 film), a film by Gipi
- The Happiest Man in the World (2022 film), a film by Teona Strugar Mitevska
