= John Agnello =

American music producer and recording engineer

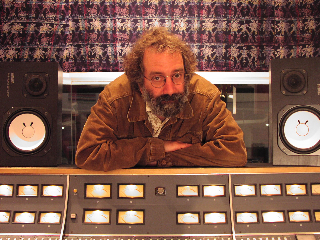
- Agnello in 2008

Background information
- Origin: United States
- Occupation(s): Music producer, audio engineer
- Years active: late 1970s - present

John Agnello is an American music producer and recording engineer who has worked with a multitude of recording artists. He has produced or co-produced dozens of albums. He also founded his own record label in the 2000s.

== Background ==
In the 1980s, John Agnello worked on albums including Uh-Huh by John Cougar Mellencamp, Rock in a Hard Place by Aerosmith, Warrior by Scandal, Stay Hungry by, Twisted Sister She's So Unusual by Cyndi Lauper, and No Brakes by John Waite.

According to New York Makers magazine, the Brooklyn-based John Agnello "is a force to be reckoned with in the music world". He has worked with artists such as Kurt Vile, Sonic Youth, Dinosaur Jr., Bruce Springsteen, Bob Dylan, and Lauper. In producing indie artists, Agnello is a veteran; according to Rolling Stone he is celebrated in that field.

Agnello has been interviewed by J. Robbins of Tape Op which appeared in issue no. 14. He has also been interviewed by Justin Colletti of Sonic Scoop, and Knut Schreiner for Tidal. Audio engineer Brian Speaker cites Agnello as being his mentor. Agnello also has a close relationship with the Magic Shop studio.

== Career ==
=== 1970s–1980s ===
According to John Agnello's interview with Tape Op, he started working for Record Plant in 1979. He began as an assistant doing manual work, cleaning up after sessions. The same day he began his job, Kiss began recording Dynasty at the Record Plant; Tom Petty and the Heartbreakers were recording Damn the Torpedoes in the studio at the time.

=== 1990s ===
John Agnello engineered the Sweet Oblivion album for the Screaming Trees. According to Mark Lanegan, the group fell in love with Agnello. In spite of Lanegan being a horror to work with, Agnello took a liking to him. They attempted to make a follow up to the Sweet Oblivion but there were issues with Lanegan and Agnello's own problems as well as with the band who weren't getting along. This put a dampener on things. However, Lanegan had some partially done songs that were intended for his solo record. He played them for Agnello who told him that they were brilliant and that they could finish them in a week. He told Lanegan to come out to New York. He booked a studio for Lanegan and it was completed. According to Lanegan the finished item wasn't Trout Mask Replica or Starsailor, but it was close enough to how he thought that it would be.

Agnello worked on the Phaseshifter album for the band Redd Kross. It was the pop album "Pick of the Week" in the 23 October 1993 issue of Cash Box. Even though the magazine indicates that he was a co-producer along with the band, it appears that his role was being an engineer.

Agnello produced the Pop Heiress album by Chainsaw Kittens which was released in 1994. According to Trouser Press it was the group's finest album. The album was reviewed in the June 20 - July 3, 1994 issue of Music Connection. The reviewer said that Agnello's production picked up from where the last disc's producer Butch Vig left off.

=== 2000s ===
==== Baryon Records ====
Agnello worked with the band Fireworks Go Up! which was Dan Coutant, Dave Fateman, and Scott Truede. He produced the group's debut You're Welcome with the first release on his Baryon Records label, (Cat# BYN 001), signaling its launch. The next album released on his label was Onyx Root by Michael Powers; it was released on Baryon BYN 002 and the album was produced by Steve Rosenthal. Anders Parker's Tell It to the Dust album came out on Agnello's Baryon label (cat# BYN 003) in 2004. In 2006 / 2007, Parker's self-titled album was released on Baryon BYN-006.

=== 2010s ===
Agnello worked with Kurt Vile on Vile's Smoke Ring for My Halo and it was released in 2011. They worked together again on Wakin on a Pretty Daze, an album.

Agnello worked as mixer on the Manhattan album by Jeffrey Lewis & Los Bolts. Brian Speaker was the recording engineer. Agnello was sought out by band Nothing for their album Dance on the Blacktop which was recorded at Dreamland Recording Studios near Woodstock, New York. It was released in 2018.

Angello worked with the group Horsegirl on their album Versions of Modern Performance which was recorded at the Chicago institution Electrical Audio studio. The group were expecting to record the album at another studio and wanted to keep what they referred to as a "scrappy DIY sound" they had in mind. Angello was the perfect man for the job because he understood the rough sound they wanted to keep and having worked with some of Horsegirl's favorite artists gave him the understanding. In February 2022, Duquette Johnston released his The Social Animals album which was produced by Agnello. It was actually completed in 2017, but Johnson held off on releasing it until he felt the time was right.
