= You're Welcome =

You're welcome is a phrase used to acknowledge an expression of gratitude.

You're Welcome may also refer to:

- You're Welcome (Wavves album), 2017, or the title track
- You're Welcome (A Day to Remember album), 2021
- You're Welcome! (Electric Six album), 2017
- You're Welcome, a 1978 album by BZN
- You're Welcome (Fireworks Go Up! album), 2004
- You're Welcome, a 2020 album by Blacklite District
- "You're Welcome" (Angel), 2004
- "You're Welcome" (song), a 1967 song by the Beach Boys
- "You're Welcome", a song from the film Moana, 2016

== See also ==
- Dōitashimashite ("You're Welcome" in Japanese), a 2010 album by Omar Rodríguez-López
- Welcome
