= Welcome =

Kind of greeting

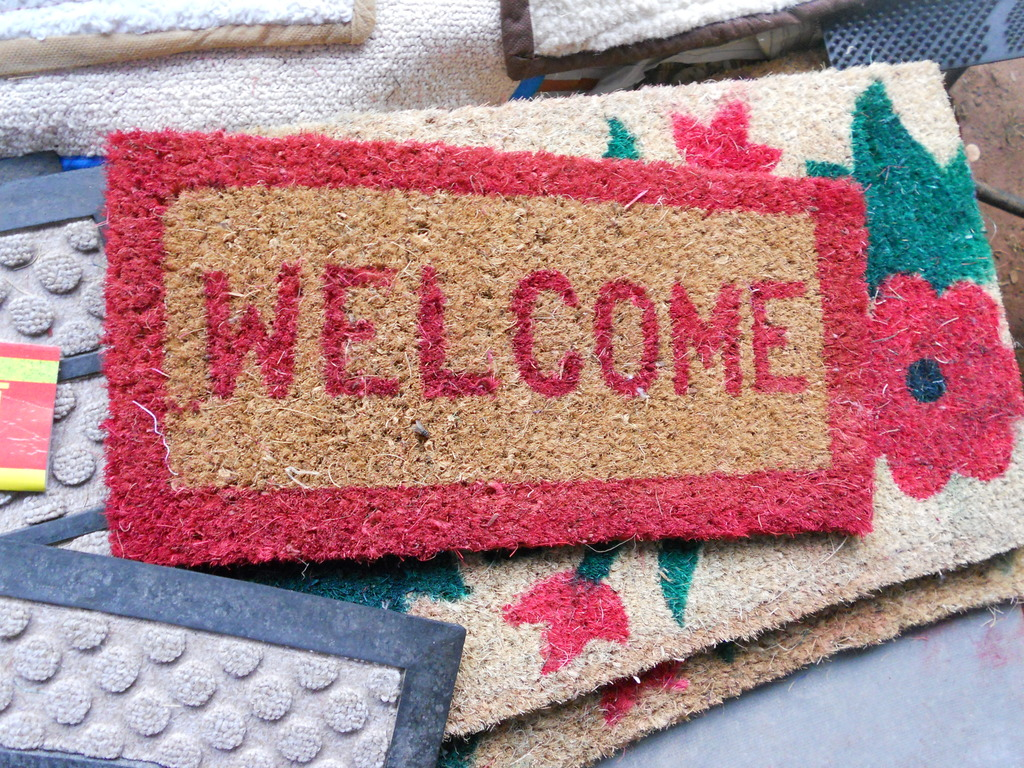
A welcome mat.

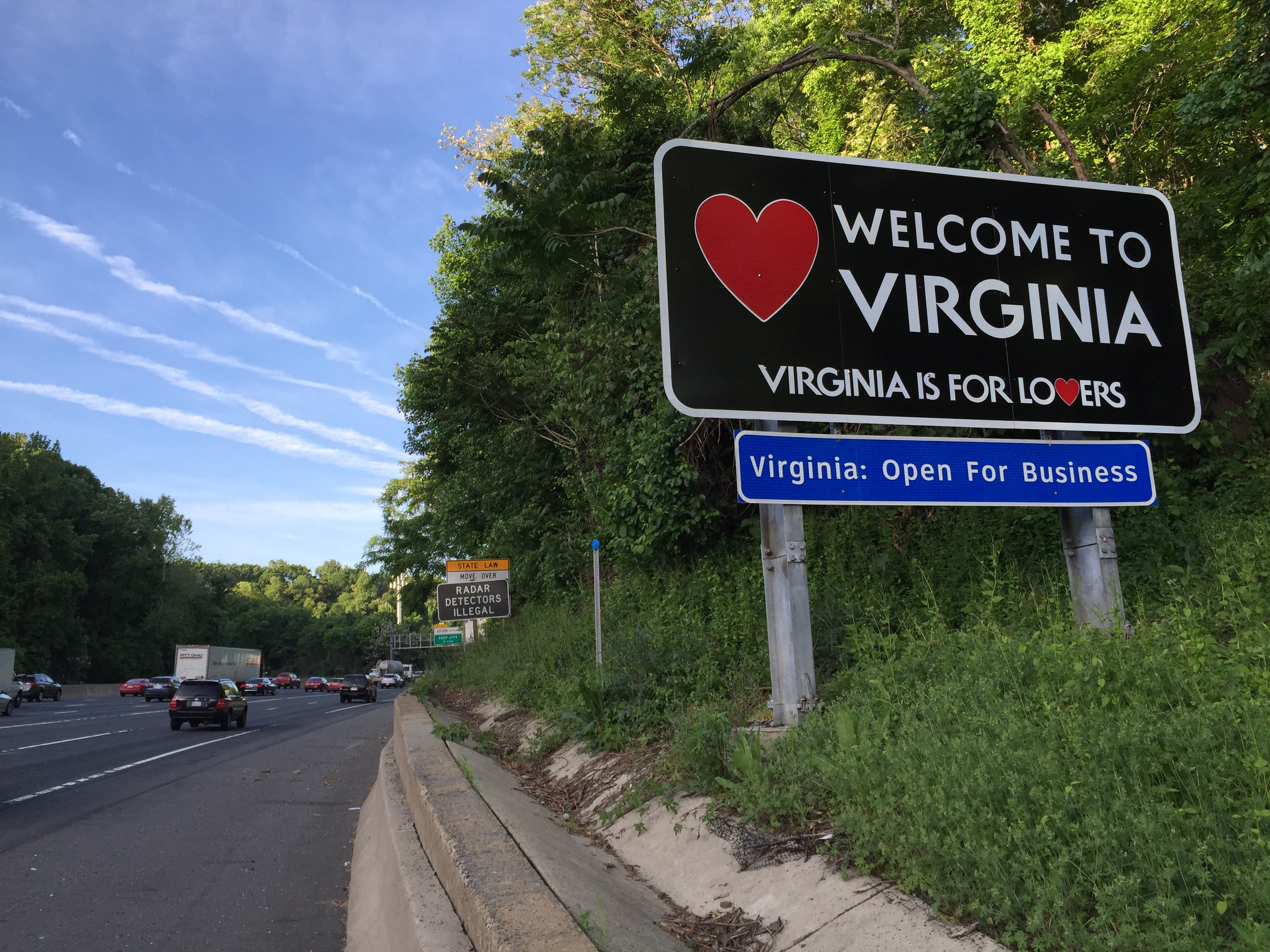
State welcome sign at the Virginia border.

A welcome is a kind of greeting designed to introduce a person to a new place or situation, and to make them feel at ease. The term can similarly be used to describe the feeling of being accepted on the part of the new person.

== Overview ==
"ƿil cuman", an Old English welcome phrase (pronounced [ˈwilkumɑn]), which was used over a thousand years ago and evolved into the modern English "welcome".

In some contexts, a welcome is extended to a stranger to an area or a household. "The concept of welcoming the stranger means intentionally building into the interaction those factors that make others feel that they belong, that they matter, and that you want to get to know them". It is also noted, however, that "[i]n many community settings, being welcoming is viewed as in conflict with ensuring safety. Thus, welcoming becomes somewhat self-limited: 'We will be welcoming unless you do something unsafe'". Different cultures have their own traditional forms of welcome, and a variety of different practices can go into an effort to welcome:

Making a welcome is not a physical fabrication, though welcome may be embodied and fostered by appropriate physical arrangements. There can be an aesthetics of welcome. What is there when one makes a welcome? No thing really, and yet more than any thing. When one makes a welcome one creates the conditions that promise of home. One makes it possible for the other not any longer to feel outside or out of it, but to feel at home.

Translations of the word welcome shown in many places frequented by foreigners or tourists to welcome people of all different nationalities.

Indications that visitors are welcome can occur at different levels. For example, a welcome sign, at the national, state, or municipal level, is a road sign at the border of a region that introduces or welcomes visitors to the region. A welcome sign might also be present for a specific community, or an individual building. One architect suggests that "[a] primary distinction between a gateway and a Welcome sign is that the gateway is usually designed and built by an outsider, a developer or architect, while the Welcome sign has been designed and built by an inside member of the community". A welcome mat is a doormat that welcomes visitors to a house or other building by providing them with a place to wipe their feet before entering.

Another community tradition, the welcome wagon, has its origins in an actual wagon containing a collection of useful gifts collected from residents of an area to welcome new people moving to that area.

== You're welcome ==
The phrase "you're welcome" is a common polite response to a person saying "thank you", shortened from "you are welcome", which originally signified that the thanking person was "welcome" to whatever they were thanking the other person for, suggesting that no thanks were needed.

== See also ==
- Gratitude
- Hello
- Hospitality
- Persona non grata
- Thank you (phrase)
- You're Welcome (disambiguation)
