= Violins (album) =

Studio album by Blondshell
- Released: September 25, 2026
- Studios: EastWest, Los Angeles; Saturn Sound, Los Angeles
- Genre: Alternative rock
- Length: 39:33
- Label: Partisan
- Producer: Yves Rothman

Blondshell chronology
If You Asked for a Picture (2025)	Violins (2026)

Singles from Violins
- 1. "Heart Has to Work So Hard" Released: May 18, 2026; 2. "Violins" Released: June 25, 2026; 3. "Fur Elise" Released: August 18, 2026; 4. "Stone Fruit" Released: September 25, 2026

Violins is the third studio album by the American alternative rock musician Blondshell, released on September 25, 2026, via Partisan Records. It was produced by Yves Rothman and recorded in Los Angeles between EastWest Studios and Saturn Sound. The record was preceded by the singles "Heart Has to Work So Hard", "Violins", and "Fur Elise", and it was accompanied with a fourth single, "Stone Fruit", on the same day as the album. Upon release, Violins was met with positive reception from critics.

== Background and recording ==
Soon after completing her second album If You Asked for a Picture (2025), Sabrina Teitelbaum initially decided to take a break from recording but quickly found herself eager to write again. In preparation, she listened to a considerable amount of guitar-based music and amassed a playlist consisting of artists such as Arthur Russell, Brian Eno, Sade, Teenage Fanclub, and Television. After sharing the playlist with Rothman, she wrote for a period on the guitar at home and proceeded to make demos with Rothman and guitarist Sam Stewart. Violins was recorded in her base city of Los Angeles at EastWest Studios and Saturn Sound.

== Composition ==
Described as an alternative rock album, Violins generally retains the musical style of the first two Blondshell albums. It does, however, mark a shift in how Teitelbaum wrote the lyrics, with her opting for a more abstract approach as opposed to the blunt lyrics that previously characterized her work.

== Promotion and release ==
On May 18, 2026, Teitelbaum released the single "Heart Has to Work So Hard" in anticipation of a new album, whose title and release date had not yet been revealed. Violins was officially announced the following June 25, accompanied by the release of its title track as the second single. The music video for "Violins" was directed by Sabra Binder. The third single, "Fur Elise", was released on August 18, 2026, with a lyric video.

Violins was released on September 25, 2026, via Partisan Records, alongside the fourth single, "Stone Fruit", and its corresponding music video, directed again by Sabra Binder. The album debuted on the UK Independent and Scottish Albums Charts at no. 11 and 21, respectively.

== Critical reception ==
Professional ratings
Aggregate scores
Source	Rating
AnyDecentMusic?	7.7/10
Metacritic	80/100
Review scores
Source	Rating
AllMusic	3.5/5 stars
Beats Per Minute	68%
Clash	9/10
DIY	4/5 stars
The Independent	4/5 stars
The Line of Best Fit	8/10
NME	4/5 stars
Paste	B
The Skinny	4/5 stars
Under the Radar	9/10

According to the review aggregator Metacritic, Violins received "generally favorable reviews" based on a weighted average score of 80 out of 100 from eleven critic scores. A different aggregator, AnyDecentMusic?, gave the album a weighted average score of 7.7 out of 10 based on fourteen critic reviews. Luke Winstanley of Clash, rating Violins 9 out of 10, said that with its "near-perfect balance of thoughtful, poetic lyricism and thrillingly adroit alternative rock", the album serves as the best representation of Teitelbaum's career thus far. Giving the album a "B" rating, Paste's Miranda Wollen praised the quality of the lyricism and production but added that the music was occasionally too homogeneous from track to track.

== Track listing ==
All lyrics are written by Sabrina Teitelbaum; all music is composed by Teitelbaum, except where noted.

Violins track listing
No.	Title	Music	Length
1.	"Violins"		4:10
2.	"Heart Has to Work So Hard"		3:12
3.	"Lucky"	Teitelbaum, Sam Stewart	3:50
4.	"Sea Legs"		4:17
5.	"New Shape"		3:43
6.	"Stone Fruit"	Teitelbaum, Stewart	3:35
7.	"Two Fried"	Teitelbaum, Samia Finnerty	2:55
8.	"New Age Trojan Horse"		3:27
9.	"Knotted"		2:58
10.	"Reinstall"		3:05
11.	"Fur Elise"		4:16
Total length:			39:33

== Personnel ==
Credits are adapted from the CD liner notes.

=== Musicians ===
- Sabrina Teitelbaum – vocals, piano
- Bosh Rothman – drums, percussion
- Anna Butterss – electric bass
- Sam Stewart – electric guitars, acoustic guitar, Mellotron, Juno-106, piano
- Pierre Simon – electric guitars, acoustic guitar, piano, Wurlitzer, Juno-106, Mellotron, Minimoog
- Joe Kennedy – guitar, piano, Farfisa, Mellotron, electric bass
- Yves Rothman – TR-909, electric guitar, electric bass, sound design
- Jamie Holmes – additional drums, percussion

=== Technical ===
- Yves Rothman – production, engineering
- Nate Haessly, Jamie Holmes, Dave Schiffman – engineering
- Beatriz Artola – mixing
- Emily Lazar – mastering at The Lodge
- Bob DeMaa – mastering assistance
- Greg Truitt – recording assistance at EastWest Studios
- Jake Supple – vocal editing

=== Packaging ===
- Reese Layton – photography
- Amy Davis – creative direction
- Sally Thurer – art direction and design

== Charts ==
Chart performance for Violins
Chart (2026)	Peak position
Scottish Albums (Official Charts)	21
UK Albums Sales (Official Charts)	20
UK Independent Albums (Official Charts)	11
