= If You Asked for a Picture =

Studio album by Blondshell
- Released: May 2, 2025
- Studios: Sunset Sound (Hollywood, California); Saturn Sound (Hollywood, California)
- Genre: Indie rock
- Length: 46:59
- Label: Partisan
- Producer: Yves Rothman

Blondshell chronology
Blondshell (2023)	If You Asked for a Picture (2025)	Violins (2026)

Singles from Blondshell
- 1. "What's Fair" Released: August 21, 2024; 2. "T&A" Released: January 9, 2025; 3. "Two Times" Released: February 20, 2025; 4. "23's a Baby" Released: April 3, 2025; 5. "Event of a Fire" Released: April 30, 2025

Professional ratings
Review scores
Source	Rating
AllMusic	4/5 stars
DIY	4/5 stars
NME	4/5 stars
Paste	7.8/10
Pitchfork	7.6/10
The Line of Best Fit	7/10

If You Asked for a Picture is the second album by American singer-songwriter Blondshell, released on May 2, 2025, via Partisan Records. The album's lead single, "What's Fair", was released on August 21, 2024. The album's second single, "T&A", was released on January 9, 2025 along with an announcement of the album's track listing and release date.

== Background and composition ==
The album is named for a line from the Mary Oliver poem, "Dogfish". In an interview with Rolling Stone at 2024's Lollapalooza, Blondshell referred to the album as "more grown up" and "full" citing her growth as an individual compared to her debut.

== Release ==
The album was released on May 2, 2025. The album is available via streaming services, with physical releases available on CD and vinyl. Teitelbaum announced a deluxe edition of the album set to release on November 14, 2025, titled Another Picture, with a remix of "Arms" featuring Gigi Perez on October 8, 2025.

== Critical reception ==
Paper Magazine described the album as "a vulnerable, often funny, always honest record delivered in melodic, pop-leaning indie rock."

=== Year-end lists ===
Publication	List	Rank	Ref.
AllMusic	Favorite Singer/Songwriter Albums	N/A	
Flood Magazine	The Best Albums of 2025	19	
The Forty-Five	The 45 Best Albums of 2025	24	
Rolling Stone	The 100 Best Albums of 2025	94	
Rolling Stone	The 55 Best Indie-Rock Albums of 2025	24	
Under the Radar	Top 100 Albums of 2025	65	

== Track listing ==
All tracks are written by Sabrina Teitelbaum, except where noted.

If You Asked for a Picture track listing
No.	Title	Writer(s)	Length
1.	"Thumbtack"		4:17
2.	"T&A"		3:45
3.	"Arms"	Teitelbaum; Sam Stewart	3:36
4.	"What's Fair"	Teitelbaum; Yves Rothman; Casey Smith	3:56
5.	"Two Times"	Teitelbaum; Stewart	3:46
6.	"Event of a Fire"		3:55
7.	"23's a Baby"	Teitelbaum; Stewart	4:13
8.	"Change"		3:55
9.	"Toy"		3:46
10.	"He Wants Me"	Teitelbaum; Stewart	3:29
11.	"Man"		3:56
12.	"Model Rockets"		4:20
Total length:			46:59

Another Picture track listing
No.	Title	Writer(s)	Length
1.	"Berlin TV Tower"
2.	"T&A" (featuring John Glacier)
3.	"23's A Baby" (with Samia)
4.	"Arms" (featuring Gigi Perez)	Teitelbaum; Stewart	3:49
5.	"Change" (with Folk Bitch Trio)
6.	"Event of a Fire" (with Conor Oberst)
7.	"Thumbtack (Live from Vevo)"

== Personnel ==
- Yves Rothman – production
- Lawrence Rothman – mixing
- Joe LaPorta – mastering

== Charts ==
Chart performance for If You Asked for a Picture
Chart (2025)	Peak position
Scottish Albums (Official Charts)	19
UK Album Downloads (Official Charts)	37
UK Independent Albums (Official Charts)	13
