= Manhattan (Jeffrey Lewis & Los Bolts album) =

Studio album by Jeffrey Lewis & Los Bolts
- Released: October 30, 2015
- Studio: Speakersonic Studios
- Genre: Anti-folk
- Length: 44:41
- Label: Rough Trade Records
- Producer: Brian Speaker, Jeffrey Lewis

Jeffrey Lewis & Los Bolts chronology
A Turn in the Dream-Songs (2011)	Manhattan (2015)	Works By Tuli Kupferberg (1923–2010) (2018)

Manhattan is an album by New York City-based anti-folk musician Jeffrey Lewis and his backing band, which is billed as Los Bolts. It was produced by Lewis himself and New York producer Brian Speaker and mixed by John Agnello. It was released on October 30, 2015 on Rough Trade Records.

== Critical reception ==
Professional ratings
Aggregate scores
Source	Rating
Metacritic	77/100
Review scores
Source	Rating
AllMusic	4/5 stars
The Guardian	4/5 stars
Punknews.org	4.5/5 stars
Rolling Stone Australia	3/5 stars
Spin	(favorable)
Uncut	7/10
Vice (Expert Witness)	A

Manhattan received generally favorable reviews from critics. For example, Paul Simpson of AllMusic gave the album 4 out of 5 stars. In his review, Simpson said that the album "focuses on tales relating to [Lewis'] home borough, resulting in some of his most personal songwriting to date"; he also described it as "one of Lewis' clearest, best-recorded and arranged albums to date".

== Track listing ==
1. Scowling Crackhead Ian
2. Thunderstorm
3. Sad Screaming Old Man
4. Back To Manhattan
5. Avenue A, Shanghai, Hollywood
6. Outta Town
7. It Only Takes A Moment
8. Support Tours
9. Have A Baby
10. Atheist Mantis
11. The Pigeon

== Personnel ==
- David Beauchamp- Drums
- Turner Cody- Guitar
- Caitlin Gray- Bass, Keyboards, Vocals
- Jeffrey Lewis & Los Bolts- Primary Artist
- Jeffrey Lewis- Composer, Guitar, Keyboards, Primary Artist, Producer
- Franic Rozycki- Bass
- Brian Speaker- Bass, Vocals, Producer
- Heather Wagner- Drums, Tambourine, Vocals
