= Versions of Modern Performance =

Studio album by Horsegirl
- Released: June 3, 2022
- Studios: Electrical Audio, Chicago, Illinois
- Genre: Indie rock
- Length: 33:07
- Language: English
- Label: Matador
- Producer: John Agnello

Horsegirl chronology
Versions of Modern Performance (2022)	Phonetics On and On (2025)

Versions of Modern Performance is the debut studio album by the American rock band Horsegirl. It was released on June 3, 2022 via Matador.

== Influences ==
The group was influenced by Sonic Youth, Yo La Tengo, and Stereolab while writing the album.

== Writing and recording ==
The album was written while the members of Horsegirl were in high school and recorded during the summer of 2021 at Electrical Audio in Chicago, Illinois with John Agnello.

== Singles and promotion ==
The first single, "Billy", was released on November 16, 2021. The album was announced on March 9, 2022 along with the single "Anti-glory". Two more singles, "World of Pots and Pans" and "Dirtbag Transformation", preceded the album's release.

The band headlined a tour in Europe and the UK followed by a tour in the United States during the summer of 2022. The band performed at Lollapalooza for the first time.

In September, 2023, Horsegirl opened for The Breeders on their Last Splash 30th Anniversary Tour for a few dates in the midwest.

== Critical reception ==
Professional ratings
Aggregate scores
Source	Rating
Metacritic	82/100
Review scores
Source	Rating
AllMusic	4.5/5 stars
Pitchfork	7.3/10

Versions of Modern Performance was met with critical acclaim upon its release, with many praising its reminiscent 1990s indie rock sound. The album appeared on multiple year-end lists and was named album of the week by Stereogum upon its release.

Year-end lists
Publication	List	Rank	Ref.
A.V. Club	The 30 Best Albums of 2022	25	
BrooklynVegan	Indie Basement: Top 40 Albums of 2022	38	
Crack	The Top 50 Albums of the Year	12	
Gorilla vs. Bear	Gorilla vs. Bear's albums of 2022	35	
Metacritic	The Freshman 15: 2022's Best Debut Albums	14	
NME	The 25 Best Debut Albums of 2022	N/A	
Paste	The 50 Best Albums of 2022	27	
Rolling Stone	The 100 Best Albums of 2022	56	
Stereogum	The 50 Best Albums of 2022	15	
Under the Radar	Top 100 Best Albums of 2022	32	

== Track listing ==
All tracks are written by Gigi Reece, Nora Cheng and Penelope Lowenstein.

No.	Title	Length
1.	"Anti-glory"	3:31
2.	"Beautiful Song"	2:57
3.	"Live and Ski"	2:23
4.	"Bog Bog 1"	1:53
5.	"Dirtbag Transformation (Still Dirty)"	3:05
6.	"The Fall of Horsegirl"	2:40
7.	"Electrolocation 2"	1:56
8.	"Option 8"	3:32
9.	"World of Pots and Pans"	2:51
10.	"The Guitar is Dead 3"	0:49
11.	"Homage to Birdnoculars"	3:37
12.	"Billy"	3:48
Total length:		33:07

Note: On vinyl, "Electrolocation 2" precedes "Anti-glory".

== Personnel ==
=== Horsegirl ===
- Nora Cheng – guitar, bass Bass VI, vocals
- Penelope Lowenstein – guitar, bass Bass VI, vocals
- Gigi Reece – drums, tambourine

=== Additional contributors ===
- John Agnello – production, mixing, engineering
- Greg Calbi – mastering
- Steve Fallone – mastering
- John San Paolo – engineering
- Lee Ranaldo – guitar on "Beautiful Song"
- Steve Shelley – auxiliary percussion on "Billy"
