= Big as Life =

Studio album by Hamell on Trial
- Released: 1994
- Genre: Anti-folk
- Label: Doolittle; Mercury
- Producer: Jeff Cole

Hamell on Trial chronology
Conviction (1989)	Big as Life (1994)	The Chord Is Mightier Than the Sword (1997)

Big as Life is an album by the American musician Hamell on Trial, released in 1994. It was put out by Doolittle Records, and picked up by Mercury the following year. "Sugarfree" was released as a single. Hamell on Trial promoted the album by touring with Syd Straw.

== Production ==
Produced by Jeff Cole, Big as Life was recorded in Austin, Texas, in a warehouse room above the Electric Lounge club. Alejandro Escovedo helped Hamell with the demos. Hamell played a 1937 Gibson on the album. The instrumentation consists of guitar, sometimes accompanied by violin or bass. "Blood of the Wolf" is about a childhood friend who attempted to rob a Kentucky Fried Chicken with a fork. A cover of "Folsom Prison Blues" appears as an unlisted track.

== Critical reception ==
Professional ratings
Review scores
Source	Rating
AllMusic	3/5 stars
Robert Christgau	(1-star Honorable Mention)
Deseret News	3/4 stars
MusicHound Rock: The Essential Album Guide	3.5/5 stars

The Tulsa World wrote that Hamell's voice "is militaristic, clipped, strident; his guitar—a 1937 small-body Gibson—is wired, alive, wincing to hold up to Hamell's infernal strumming." Robert Christgau praised "Z-Roxx" and the title track. The Dallas Observer stated that Hamell "destroys the perception of the self-serious acoustic folkie who believes wisdom lies in glib aphorism and weepy revelation."

Entertainment Weekly determined that "what sounds thrilling on stage comes off as rushed and overbaked on record." The Indianapolis Star commended the "intriguing if creepy stories." The Record concluded that "Hamell combines explosive punk-edged fury and a scathing acoustic guitar style ... with poetic lyrics that are sometimes humorous, sometimes upsetting, sometimes poignant but always edged with a razor-sharp honesty."

AllMusic wrote that Hamell "combined the best elements of the one-man-band storytelling tradition with an aggressive, hyper-rhythmic acoustic guitar attack that absolutely demanded attention." In 1997, The Austin Chronicle deemed the album "six cups of coffee and two hits of crystal meth—frenzied."

== Track listing ==
No.	Title	Length
1.	"Sugarfree"
2.	"Harmony"
3.	"Blood of the Wolf"
4.	"Brother Franklin"
5.	"Big as Life"
6.	"Pep Rally"
7.	"Z-Roxx"
8.	"Dead Man's Float"
9.	"Piccolo Joe"
10.	"In the Neighborhood"
11.	"Open Up the Gates"
12.	"Get in the Game"
