= Ungodly =

EP by Baum
- Released: March 16, 2018
- Genre: Indie pop
- Length: 16:46
- Label: Independent
- Producers: The Orphanage (Trevor Brown, Zaire Koalo)

Baum chronology
Ungodly (2018)	Blondshell (2023)

Singles from Ungodly
- 1. "Hot Water" Released: August 17, 2017; 2. "Effortless" Released: November 17, 2017; 3. "This Body" Released: February 9, 2018

Ungodly is the debut EP by American alternative pop artist Baum (later known as Blondshell). It was released on March 16, 2018.

== Background ==
Originally from New York City, Sabrina Teitelbaum had written and performed music from a young age, and had posted songs to SoundCloud since 2014, while still in high school. She moved to Los Angeles to attend USC Thornton School of Music, but dropped out after two years to focus on a music career. Teitelbaum then began as BAUM in 2017, debuting with the single "First". The EP, initially announced under the name First, was produced by Oak Felder proteges The Orphanage (Trevor Brown and Zaire Koalo), who had previously worked on Demi Lovato's "Sorry Not Sorry".

== Musical style, composition, and themes ==
The music of BAUM was identified as alternative pop, indie pop, dark pop, electropop, synth-pop, chill pop, and soul-pop, a sound Teitelbaum labelled "natural grunge". The Ungodly EP has a dance-pop sound that evokes Haim, Muna, Carly Rae Jepsen, Lady Gaga, Lorde, and Tei Shi. Lead single "Hot Water" was described as "poppy and soulful", "an '80s revival akin to early Haim and more recent Carly Rae Jepsen", and "flitting between Robyn-esque, fist-pumping pop to a more floaty bop reminiscent of The 1975." "Effortless" was said by Galore to have "all the Haim vibes you can handle" with vocal similarities to Lana Del Rey and Adele. Elsewhere, "This Body" utilizes finger snaps and elements of electropop and tropical house, "Dream Girl is an R&B song, while the title track was described by Clash as "divine of chorus and cutting of lyric".

Lyrically, the EP tackles themes of first love, heartbreak, coming of age, sexuality, mental health, body positivity, female empowerment, and self-love. Opener and lead single "Hot Water" was written about Teitelbaum's first encounters with women after coming out as bisexual and her lack of experience at the time. "Effortless", inspired by a friend's heartbreak, imagines taking revenge on a cheating ex-partner; the song was initially conceived as a sad piano ballad but became more focused on anger and empowerment during the writing. "This Body" is a self-love and body image anthem, written in response to a catcalling incident Teitelbaum experienced at USC, while "Dream Girl" is about adopting a false persona to for the benefit of a partner. "Ungodly", the title track, was a last-minute addition to the EP; Teitelbaum cited it as her favorite song on the project and a perfect summary of its themes, describing it as "about being a young person and doing crazy, reckless things to feel alive and to feel loved".

Teitelbaum told Billboard that “The whole thing is about empowering yourself in coming-of-age situations where you wouldn’t think you have all the power, where it gets taken away from you...I want people in high school or early college to hear it and think, ‘I went through that,’ and that there can be a happy ending to these things.” She would later say the project was "a lot of songs I wrote when I was 18 and 19" that were "about what I was going through in high school and being self-destructive."

== Release ==
Ungodly's rollout began with the single release of "Hot Water" on August 17, 2017. The single was marked with a concert at Manhattan's Rockwood Music Hall the following day, and a music video - directed by Parker Foster and Chris Alessandra in San Francisco's historic Haight-Ashbury neighborhood, and depicting a lesbian couple falling in love - was released on September 29 via the magazine Ladygunn. The second single, "Effortless", was premiered on November 17 by Wonderland. A third single, "This Body", was released on February 9, 2018, premiered by Billboard and Nylon, and was used by Target for their "No Body Like Mine" campaign.

Teitelbaum self-released the EP on March 16, 2018. That same month, Teitelbaum performed at South by Southwest, her first festival appearance, and was featured on the festival's official 2018 playlist. She was scheduled to perform in April at Boston's Middle East nightclub with singer Dagny, but cancelled due to a case of bronchitis. She was also highlighted on Spotify's curated playlists "Out Now" and "Young & Free".

== Aftermath ==
Following inactivity due to personal turmoil, Teitelbaum resurfaced in May 2019, releasing the singles "Fuckboy" and "Bad Kid", and had begun work with producer Yves Rothman on a second Baum EP, to be titled Curve. However, Teitelbaum had grown unsatisfied with her pop direction as Baum and, with Rothman's encouragement, abandoned the EP in favor making alternative rock music under the name Blondshell. Gaining more notoriety in this iteration, she reteamed with Rothman for her self-titled debut album, which was released in 2023 on Partisan Records and received critical acclaim.

== Track listing ==
All tracks are written by Sabrina Teitelbaum.

No.	Title	Writer(s)	Length
1.	"Hot Water"	Teitelbaum, Rett Madison	2:59
2.	"This Body"		3:43
3.	"Effortless"		3:04
4.	"Dream Girl"		3:46
5.	"Ungodly"		3:12
Total length:			16:46
