= Every Bad =

Studio album by Porridge Radio
- Released: 13 March 2020
- Length: 41:39
- Label: Secretly Canadian

Porridge Radio chronology
Rice, Pasta and Other Fillers (2016)	Every Bad (2020)	Waterslide, Diving Board, Ladder to the Sky (2022)

Professional ratings
Aggregate scores
Source	Rating
AnyDecentMusic?	8.1/10
Metacritic	86/100
Review scores
Source	Rating
Clash	9/10
DIY	4.5/5 stars
Exclaim!	9/10
The Guardian	4/5 stars
The Independent	4/5 stars
The Line of Best Fit	8.5/10
NME	5/5 stars
Paste	8.8/10
Pitchfork	8.4/10
The Skinny	4/5 stars

Every Bad is the second studio album by British indie rock band Porridge Radio. It was released on 13 March 2020 on the record label Secretly Canadian. The album was nominated for the 2020 Mercury Prize.

== Critical reception ==
Every Bad was met with universal acclaim reviews from critics. At Metacritic, which assigns a weighted average rating out of 100 to reviews from mainstream publications, this release received an average score of 86, based on 15 reviews.

=== Accolades ===
Accolades for Every Bad
Publication	Accolade	Rank	Ref.
BrooklynVegan	BrooklynVegan's Top 55 Albums of 2020	17	
NME	The 50 Best Albums of 2020	18	
Paste	Paste's 25 Best Albums of 2020 – Mid-Year	4	
Paste	The 50 Best Albums of 2020	6	
Pitchfork	The 50 Best Albums of 2020	23	
Stereogum	Stereogum's 50 Best Albums of 2020 – Mid-Year	13	
Stereogum	The 50 Best Albums of 2020	39	
Under the Radar	Top 100 Albums of 2020	42	

== Track listing ==
Every Bad track listing
No.	Title	Length
1.	"Born Confused"	3:02
2.	"Sweet"	3:42
3.	"Don't Ask Me Twice"	3:21
4.	"Long"	4:50
5.	"Nephews"	4:21
6.	"Pop Song"	5:02
7.	"Give/Take"	3:53
8.	"Lilac"	5:27
9.	"Circling"	3:20
10.	"(Something)"	1:58
11.	"Homecoming Song"	2:43
Total length:		41:39

== Charts ==
Chart performance for Every Bad
Chart (2020)	Peak position
Portuguese Albums (AFP)	41
Scottish Albums (Official Charts)	65
UK Independent Albums (Official Charts)	11
