= You're Welcome (Fireworks Go Up! album) =

Studio album by Fireworks Go Up!
- Released: June 15, 2004
- Producer: John Agnello

You're Welcome is a 2004 album by American band Fireworks Go Up!. Released on the Baryon label, it was the group's debut album and received mainly positive reviews.

== Background ==
The band Fireworks Go Up! was formed in 2003 by Dan Coutant with bassist Dave Fateman and drummer Scott Treude.

This was the first release for John Agnello's Baryon Records label. It was released on Baryon BYN001. The album also signaled the launch of John Agnello's new label.

Dan Coutant was formerly with a band called Joshua, that broke up in 2003. Producer John Agnello had in the past produced for Patti Smith, Aerosmith, Alice Cooper, Jay Farrar, and Dinosaur Jr.

== Critical reception ==
The album received critical acclaim upon release.

The album was reviewed by Stewart Mason of AllMusic. He made a comparison between Dan Coutant's vocals on "Delusionist" and "The Queen Is Dead"-era Morrissey, saying that they were a frighteningly accurate imitation. He also said that the opening track, "The Sun Don't Burn Without Her" had a power-poppy sweetness and used groups the Shoes and the Motors as examples. He finished off by saying that the album was superior to Coutant's earlier work. It was given three and a half stars.

Ernest Simpson of Treblezine said, "If nothing else can be said about the production, it can be said that it’s tight, polished, and fairly solid."

Tim Den of Lollipop Magazine praised Dan Coutant's songwriting and said that he was one of the more articulate/intelligent jagged-pop writers in the last five years. He said that the music was just as good and even better than anything the group Joshua did. He also noted John Agnello's production which had brought out the most imaginative chord changes that Coutant had written. He also mentioned stellar vocal performances and made comparisons to the groups Foo Fighters and the Fire Theft.

A July 2005 review by Shredding Paper was positive. It began by referring to it as "decent, but unspectacular indie rock stuff". The similarity between the album's material and some later material by the Promise Ring was mentioned. The songs "Me Myself", and "Delusionist" were named as the best songs. He said that the album got better with each listen and he was on his fifth listen at the time of the review.

The album had a brief review in the November/December issue of Punk Planet 64. The reviewer said that the group "definitely went to the Death Cab for Cutie school of rock" which was fine and that the album featured 10 finely crafted, driving pop songs.

== Chart performance ==
The album was one of the adds for June 21–22 as per the This Week's Priorities section of CMJ 21 June 2004.

The album debuted at no. 139 on the CMJ Radio 200 chart on the week of 19 July 2004. The following week it was at no. 112 which was its peak position. It spent a total of four weeks in the chart.

The album had debuted at no. 15 in the Radio 150 Adds top 20 chart in July.

== Track listing ==
1. "The Sun Don't Burn Without Her" – 3:07
2. "Chewed Up and Spit Out" – 3:46
3. "Stronger as It Goes" – 3:25
4. "A Glorious Mood" – 2:58
5. "Say the Right Things" – 2:55
6. "The Heavy Route" – 4:12
7. "Me Myself" – 3:16
8. "Post Commitment Pit" – 3:18
9. "Delusionist" – 3:12
10. "Just a Hate Song" – 3:03
