= The Happiest Man in the World (album) =

Studio album by Hamell on Trial
- Released: February 25, 2014
- Genres: Folk punk, rock and roll
- Length: 47:45
- Label: New West
- Producers: Hamell on Trial, Phil Nicolo, Brian Speaker, Wammo, Brian Wolff

Hamell on Trial chronology
Rant and Roll (2008)	The Happiest Man in the World (2014)

The Happiest Man in the World is an album by American folk punk musician Hamell on Trial, released on February 25, 2014, on New West Records.

== Critical reception ==
Professional ratings
Review scores
Source	Rating
AllMusic	3.5/5 stars
American Songwriter	3.5/4 stars
Blurt	4/5 stars
Cuepoint (Expert Witness)	A–
The Line of Best Fit	7/10
The Skinny	3/5 stars

American Songwriter's Hal Horowitz gave The Happiest Man in the World 3.5 out of 4 stars, describing it as "a powerful and revealing introduction to a guy whose full talents can only be experienced in concerts where he really lets loose". Mark Deming of AllMusic wrote, "As Joe Strummer told us, anger can be power, and Hamell on Trial still has a full tank of the stuff cut with some snarky but potent humor, and it fuels The Happiest Man in the World very well indeed."

== Track listing ==
1. "Artist in America" — 6:06
2. "Happiest Man in the World" — 5:52
3. "Bobby and the Russians" — 3:49
4. "Global Tattoo" — 4:11
5. "Together" — 2:49
6. "Ain't That Love?" — 3:36
7. "Lappa Oo Mau Mau" — 4:31
8. "Richard's Got a Job" — 2:18
9. "Whores" — 2:18
10. "Jennifer's Stripping Again" — 3:07
11. "Mom's Hot" — 2:40
12. "Blessed" — 3:45
