= Hamell on Trial =

American musician

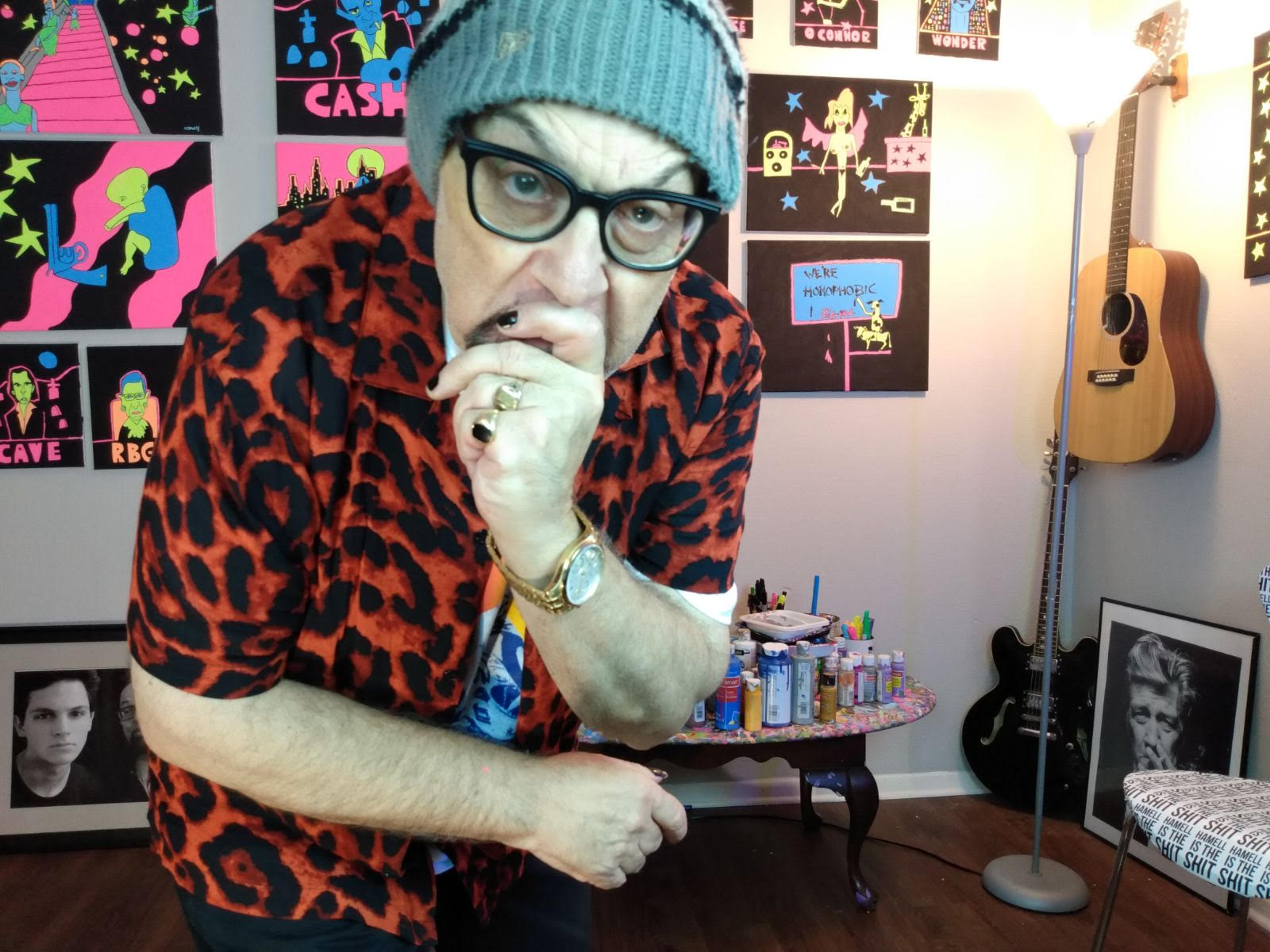
- Hamell on Trial at home in Austin, Texas, in 2023

Background information
- Origin: New York City
- Genres: Punk rock, anti-folk
- Years active: 1989–present
- Label: Righteous Babe

Edward James "Ed" Hamell, performing as Hamell on Trial, is an American punk rock, anti-folk, spoken word musician, described by Righteous Babe Records as "loud, fast music informed by politics, passion, energy and intelligence, played by a guy with a sharp tongue and a wicked sense of humor".

== Biography ==
Born in Syracuse, New York, Hamell spent years as a member of many bands before venturing into the realm of the solo singer-songwriter. He finally got his big break when he moved to Austin, Texas and earned a residency at first the Chicago House and then the Electric Lounge.

Since then, he has released a number of albums on various labels, including Mercury Records, his own DiY label Such-A-Punch Media, and Righteous Babe Records, the label started by his longtime supporter and frequent touring companion, Ani Difranco. Ed has a son named Detroit, born in 2002. Detroit performed on Ed's album The Happiest Man in the World. Hamell was seriously injured in a car accident in May 2000, but recovered from head and spinal injuries to release the album Ed's Not Dead: Hamell Comes Alive the following year. His touring covers the US, Europe, Scandinavia and Australia.

In 2008, with the breakup of his 22-year marriage, Hamell wrote a song a day for a year and posted a video of it on his YouTube channel hamelltv. It is now over 450 songs.

In 2014 Hamell signed to New West Records and released The Happiest Man in the World. He began production on a one-man show with the same title based on the album and the demise of his marriage to be world premiered at The Edinburgh Fringe Festival in August 2014.

In 2017, Hamell released his second album for New West Records, Tackle Box. In August of that year, Hamell streamed a selection of songs performed live at monuments around Washington, DC, in a series collectively called "Hamell Takes DC."

In 2018, Hamell composed the music and lyrics for the Columbus, Ohio based Shadowbox Live's play F#(K Cancer: The Musical.

== Style ==
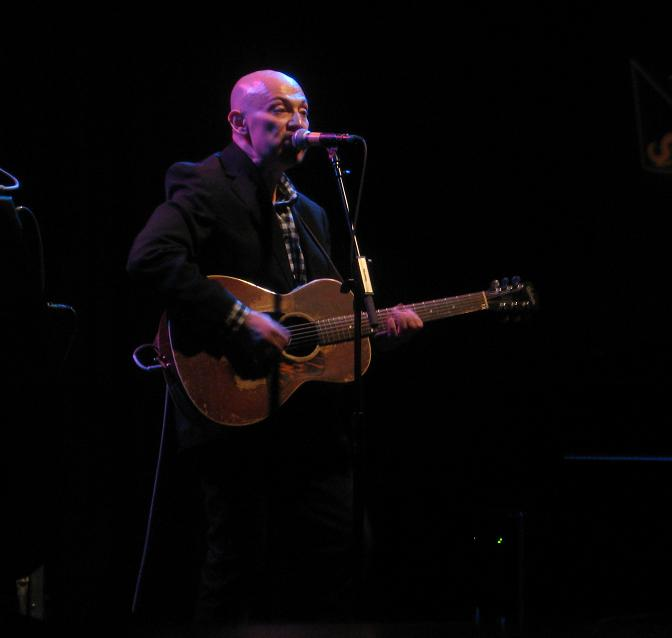
Hamell on Trial performing at World Cafe Live in May 2009

Hamell addresses poignant and controversial issues, but with a comic edge. Known for rapid and powerful strumming on his heavily amplified 1937 Gibson L-00 acoustic guitar, Hamell's musical styling is as far from traditional folk music as it is from the typical drum-heavy electric guitar ridden sounds of traditional punk music. "Hamell’s signature sound comes from his strumming with maximum aggression, tight to the bridge, which lends a metallic ring to a sustained and percussive low-end rumble," writes Randal Doane, in a profile in Harper's. "Hamell also plays slide guitar lines sweetly drenched with the timbre and phrasing of his musical forebears of the Mississippi Delta. 'I’m a Libra,' he told me last fall, over coffee. 'I need the balance.'"

== Discography ==
- 1989 – Conviction (Blue Wave)
- 1992 – Letter to Mike (Self-Published, cassette only)
- 1996 – Big as Life (Doolittle/Mercury)
- 1997 – The Chord is Mightier Than the Sword (PolyGram)
- 1999 – Choochtown (Such-A-Punch Media)
- 2001 – Ed's Not Dead: Hamell Comes Alive (Such-A-Punch Media)
- 2003 – Yap (Such-A-Punch Media)
- 2003 – Tough Love (Righteous Babe Records)
- 2006 – Songs for Parents Who Enjoy Drugs (Righteous Babe Records)
- 2008 – Live From Edinburgh: The Terrorism of Everyday Life (Righteous Babe Records)
- 2008 – Rant and Roll (Righteous Babe Records)
- 2014 – The Happiest Man in the World (New West Records)
- 2017 – Tackle Box (New West Records)
- 2017 – Big Mouth Strikes Again (New West Records)
- 2018 – The Night Guy at The Apocalypse, Profiles of a Rushing Midnight (Saustex Records)
- 2020 – The Pandemic Songs (Saustex Records)
- 2023 – Bring the Kids (Saustex Records)
- 2025 – Harp (For Harry) (Such-A-Punch Media / Saustex Records)
- 2025 – Dirty Xmas (Such-A-Punch Media / Saustex Records)

== Awards and honors ==
May 2007 – inducted into the SAMMY (Syracuse Area Music Awards) Hall of Fame
Aug 2007 – Herald Angel Award at the Edinburgh Fringe Festival
May 2009 – Conveyor Awards of Excellence for Best Story Telling – Non-Theatrical & Best Musical Moments at the Cincinnati Fringe Festival
July 2009 – Directors' Award at the Capital Fringe Festival

== See also ==
- Mercury Records
- Righteous Babe Records
- New West Records
