= Night Moves (band) =

American indie rock band

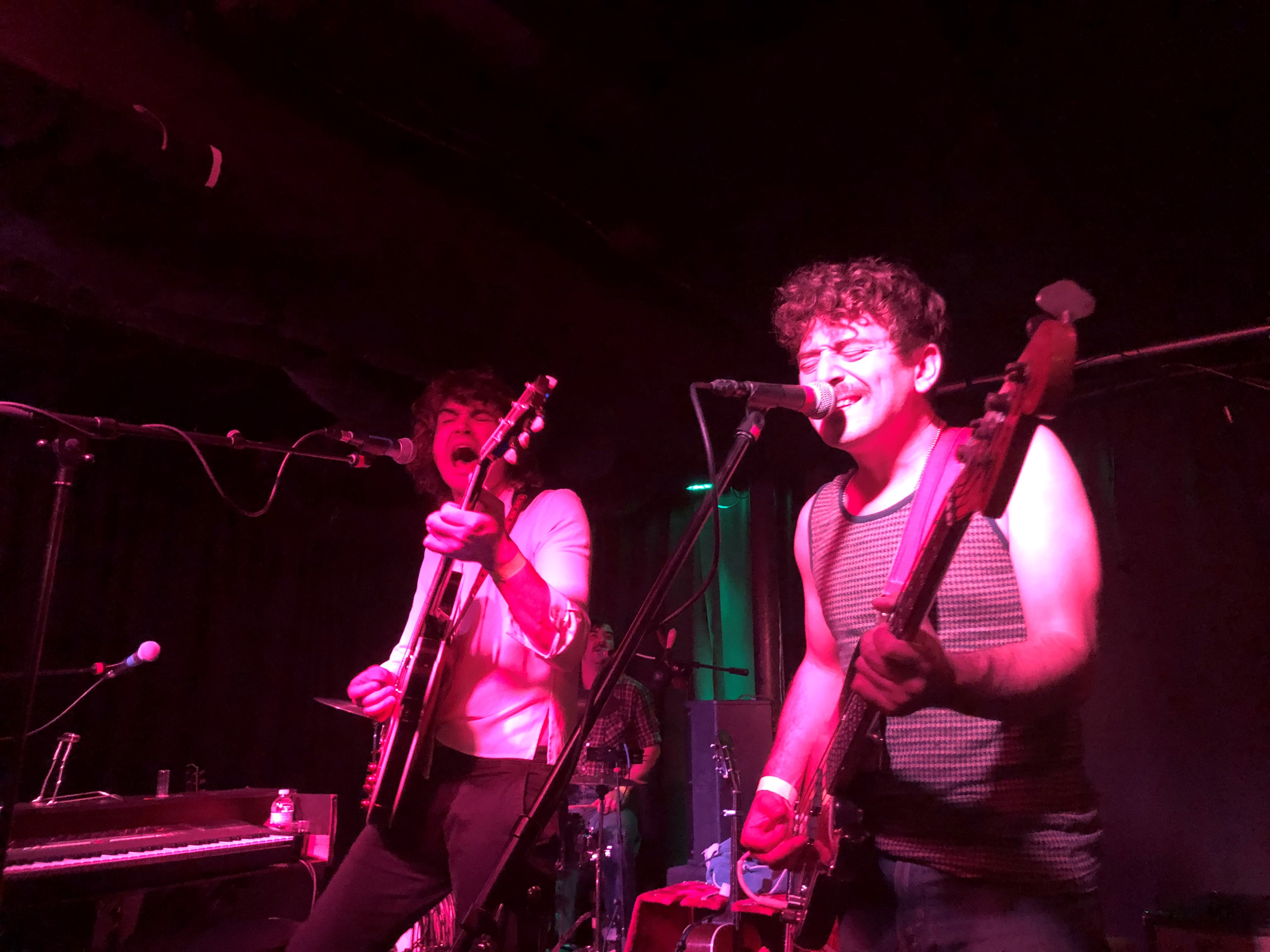
- Night Moves performing in July 2022.

Background information
- Origin: Minneapolis, Minnesota
- Genres: Indie rock; rock
- Years active: 2010–present
- Label: Domino Recording Company
- Members: John Pelant; Micky Alfano; Mark Hanson; Charles Murlowski
- Past members: Mark Ritsema
- Website: www.nightmovesmpls.com

Night Moves are an American indie rock band from Minneapolis.

== History ==
Night Moves began in 2012, releasing their first full-length record titled Colored Emotions on Domino Records. In 2016, they released their second album on Domino titled Pennied Days. In 2019, they released their third album on Domino titled Can You Really Find Me. On July 25, 2025, Night Moves released their fourth album, Double Life. The lead single, "Hold On To Tonight", came out on March 31, 2025.

== Discography ==
Studio albums

- Colored Emotions (2012, Domino)
- Pennied Days (2016, Domino)
- Can You Really Find Me (2019, Domino)
- Double Life (2025, Domino)

Extended Plays

- Carl Sagan EP (2017, Domino)
- The Redaction (2022, Domino)
