= Chulita Vinyl Club =

DJ collective of women of color

Chulita Vinyl Club (CVC) is an all-vinyl, all-genre DJ collective whose members are self-identifying women of color and non-binary people of color. The CVC was formed to provide a safe space in which its members can embrace their heritage through collecting, sharing, and playing music that is culturally significant to them. Since its founding in 2014, the CVC has grown, to seven chapters throughout Texas and California. The CVC, like other all-women DJ collectives, seeks to shatter gender barriers prevalent in the male-dominated DJ scene.

== Origins ==
The Chulita Vinyl Club was founded by Claudia Saenz in 2014. "Chulita" is a diminutive of the Spanish slang word chula meaning "beautiful", "cute", or "sexy." Using social media to find women interested in joining her, Saenz formed the first official chapter of Chulita Vinyl Club in Austin, Texas in 2014. Today there are a total of seven chapters in Texas and California.

Ever since its formation the CVC has had news media coverage from local publications, mostly focused on the cultural and gender aspects of the CVC. On November 13, 2017, Univision 14 aired a special report called "Las chulitas de la Bahía" ("The Chulitas of the Bay") that featured members of the Bay Area chapter.

== Music and Gigs ==
The CVC has performed a wide range of musical genres, such as yé-yé pop, garage girls, punk, indie pop, northern soul, new wave, post-punk, riot grrrl, motown, ska, diy pop, oi!, power pop, twee, chicano oldies, 1960s soul, pop, chicano soul-dies, tejano, mexican rock, mexican punk, latino punk, rocksteady, dancehall reggae, 1970s funk, 1960s psychedelic Peruvian cover songs, cumbia, spanish rock, funk, r&b, oldies, norteños, corridos, and conjuntos. Each member brings a unique sound into the collective based on her personal record collection, whether inherited from family members or purchased at thrift stores, record stores, or flea markets.

The CVC strives to support local members of the community and typically plays gigs that support local artists or non profit organizations, especially those that seek to preserve minority culture and eliminate the plight of people of color. The CVC also performs at large music and art festivals such as Coachella Valley Music and Arts Festival, Demon Dayz Festival, Primavera Sound, and the annual 20th Street Block Party. In addition, CVC chapters have residencies at various bars/clubs in their respective cities.

In an effort to have their music reach a larger audience, the members of CVC post mixes from their personal collections on the collective's SoundCloud profile.

== Membership ==
The CVC is an inclusive collective and welcomes people who identify as "women, gender-non-conforming, non-binary, LGBTQ+ and people of color." While each member identifies with an individual nationality or culture, many of the members are "Latinas, Tejanas, Chicanas, Xicana and more." There are chapters in:

- California: Bay Area, Los Angeles, San Diego, Santa Ana
- Texas: Austin - First chapter (2014), Rio Grande Valley, San Antonio

== Accolades ==
In 2017 the weekly alternative newspaper The Austin Chronicle named Chulita Vinyl Club the Best All-Vinyl DJ Crew.

Chulita Vinyl Club's SoundCloud profile won the 2018 MORA (Mixcloud Online Radio Awards) for Best Online Music Show, Eclectic category.
