= Porridge Radio =

British indie rock band

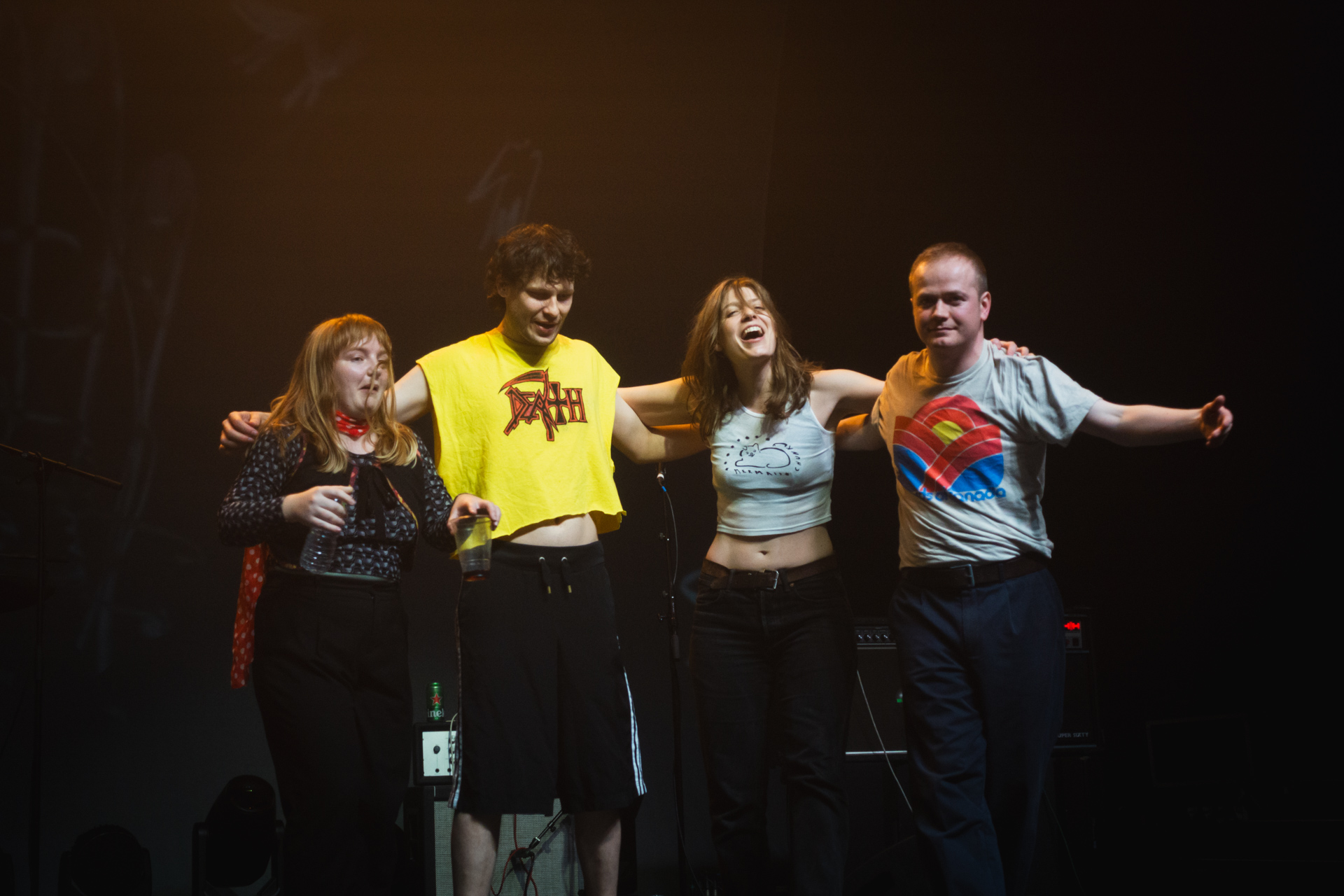
- Porridge Radio in 2025

Background information
- Origin: Brighton, England, United Kingdom
- Genres: Indie pop; indie rock; post-punk; slowcore; lo-fi
- Years active: 2015–2025
- Labels: Secretly Canadian; Memorials of Distinction; Eyeless
- Members: Dana Margolin; Georgie Stott; Sam Yardley; Dan Hutchins
- Past members: Maddie Ryall
- Website: porridgeradio.com

Porridge Radio were a British indie rock band formed in Brighton in 2015. They are fronted by vocalist, songwriter and guitarist Dana Margolin. The other members are keyboardist Georgie Stott and drummer Sam Yardley, bassist Dan Hutchins, and formerly bassist Maddie Ryall.

The Guardian listed them among their top 40 new artists of 2018 and described their music as 'slacker indie'.

== History ==
Porridge Radio was started by Dana Margolin, who prior to starting the band was attending open mics, and songwriting in her bedroom. She formed Porridge Radio as a way to express herself by using inspiration from the sea and her seaside home of Brighton. The band was formed with Maddie Ryall on bass, Georgie Stott on keyboard, and Sam Yardley on drums.

The band performed a live session for Marc Riley's show on BBC Radio 6 Music in May 2019 and again in February 2020.

They were signed to US independent label Secretly Canadian in December 2019. In January 2020, they announced their second album and their label debut, Every Bad, which was released on 13 March 2020 to critical acclaim. Later that year they released three singles; "Good For You" was co-released on 2 July 2020 with the artist Lala Lala, "7 Seconds" was released on 14 September 2020, and "The Last Time I Saw You (O Christmas)" was released on 8 December 2020.

The band released Waterslide, Diving Board, Ladder to the Sky in 2022.

Bassist Maddie Ryall left the band in March, 2023. In the following year the band announced a new tour, they released a new album Clouds In The Sky They Will Always Be There For Me and a single "Sick Of The Blues".

On 15 January 2025 Porridge Radio announced that they would not record any more new songs and would disband after completing the planned North American and European tours. On 21 February that year, the band released their ostensibly last EP, The Machine Starts to Sing, with Under the Radar expressing sadness "to see that light go out, but at least we have this last moment of illumination."

In April 2025, the band announced their final UK shows would be in December. In August 2025, a final London show was added to the December tour.

On 16 September 2026, Dana Margolin released her first single as a solo artist, "Big Beautiful Sound". It was recorded with Porridge Radio members Sam Yardley and Dan Hutchins. The music video was directed by Mike Mills and Joe Nankin in Los Angeles.

== Discography ==
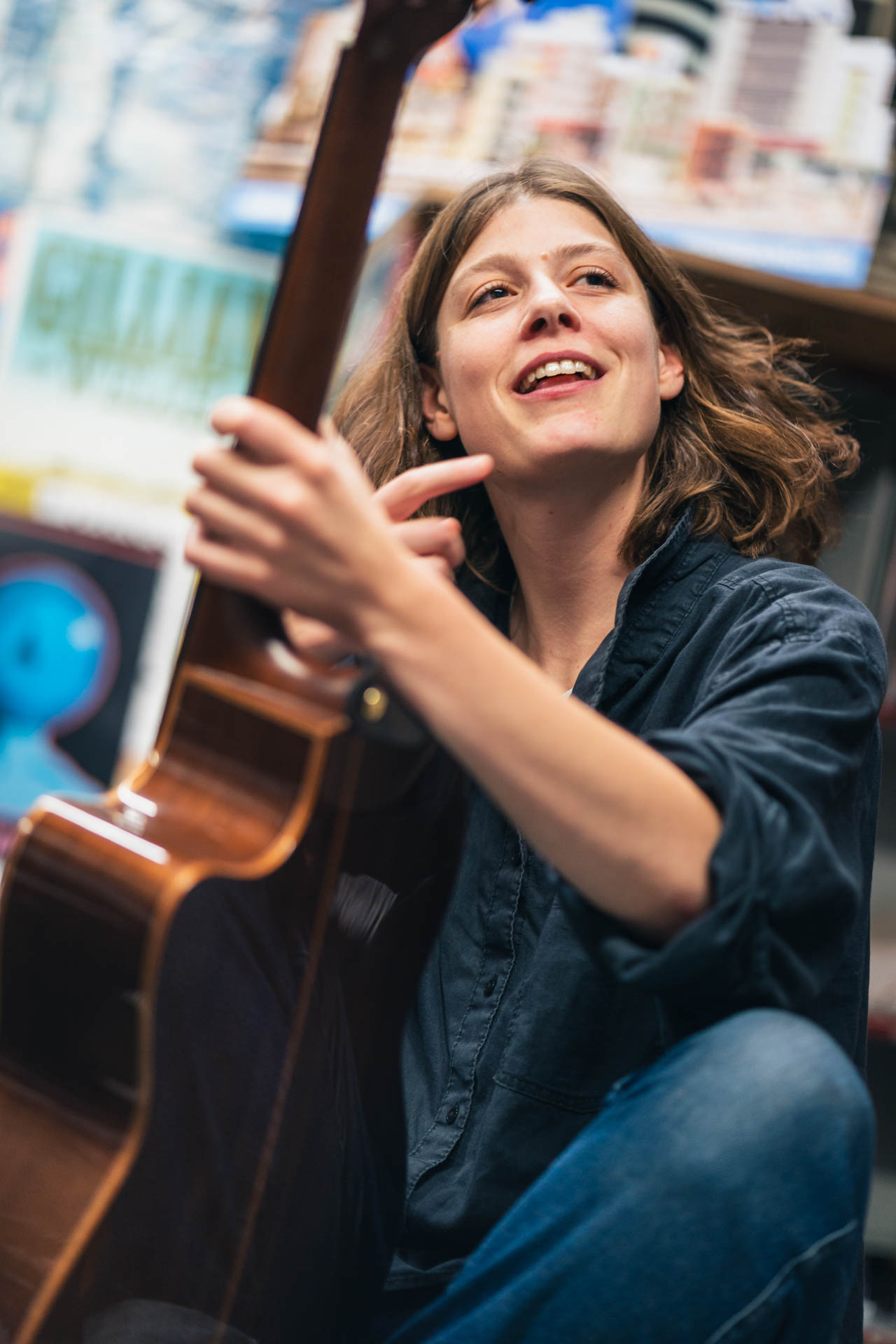
Dana Margolin at Rough Trade West in 2024

=== Albums ===
- Misery Radio (Eyeless, May 2015)
- I'm Not Sure Anymore (self-released, December 2015)
- Hello Dog Friendly (Split album with West America; Memorials of Distinction, January 2016)
- Rice, Pasta and Other Fillers (Memorials of Distinction, August 2016)
- Every Bad (Secretly Canadian, March 2020)
- Waterslide, Diving Board, Ladder to the Sky (Secretly Canadian, May 2022) – No. 39 UK
- Clouds in the Sky They Will Always Be There for Me (Secretly Canadian, October 2024)

=== EPs ===
- Say sorry or die (solo 2016) (January 2016)
- frgttng (solo 2016) (October 2016)
- The Machine Starts to Sing (Secretly Canadian, February 2025)

=== Singles ===
- "O Christmas" (Art Is Hard, December 2017)
- "Give/Take" (Memorials of Distinction, April 2019)
- "Don't Ask Me Twice" (Memorials of Distinction, May 2019)
- "Lilac" (Secretly Canadian, December 2019)
- "Good for You (with Lala Lala)" (Secretly Canadian, July 2020)
- "7 Seconds" (Secretly Canadian, September 2020)
- "Back to the Radio" (Secretly Canadian, February 2022)
- "The Rip" (Secretly Canadian, May 2022)
- "Sick of the Blues" (Secretly Canadian, 2024)

== Awards and nominations ==
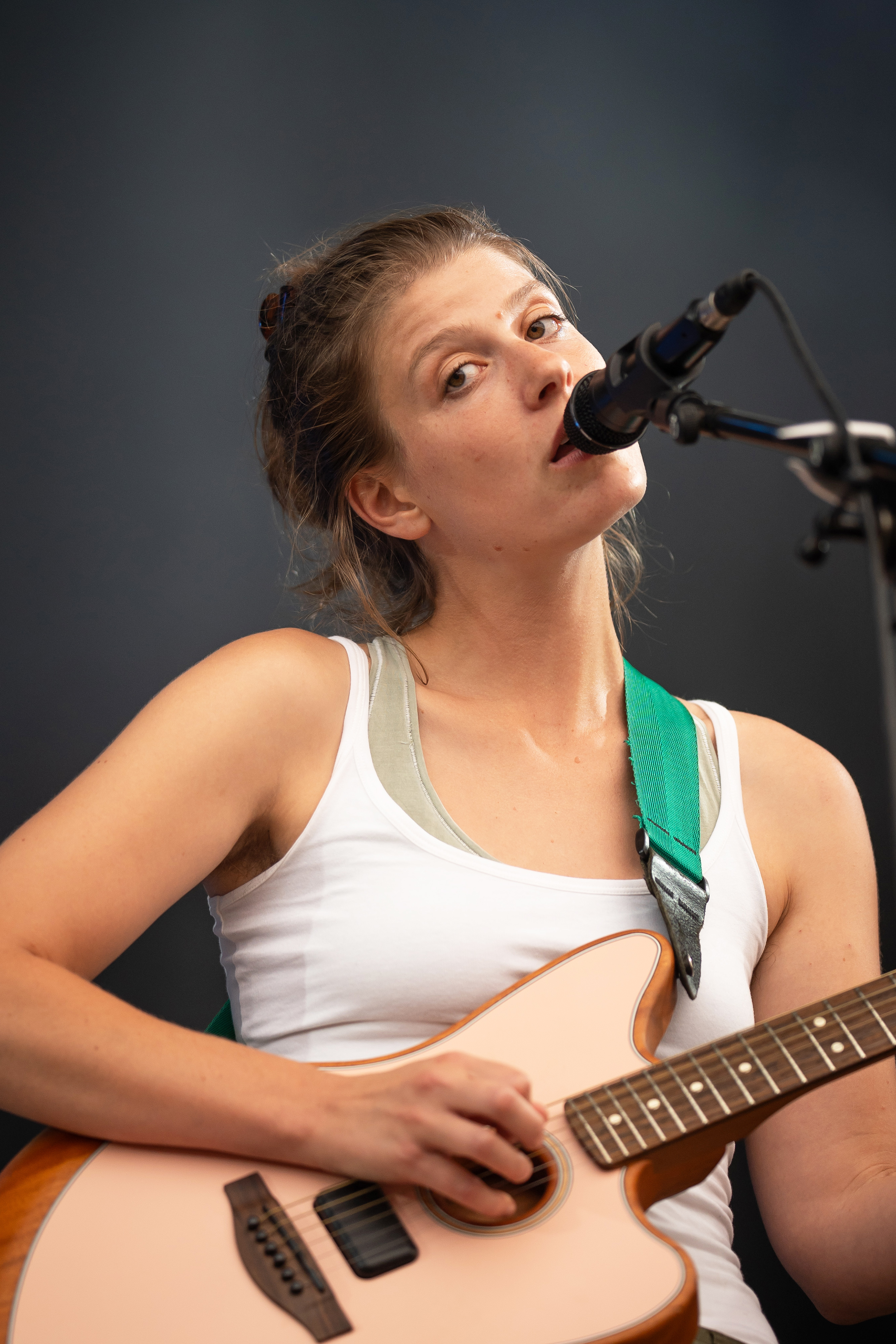
Dana Margolin at La Route du Rock 2025.

Year	Award	Work	Result
2020	Mercury Prize	Every Bad	Nominated
