= Horsegirl =

American rock band

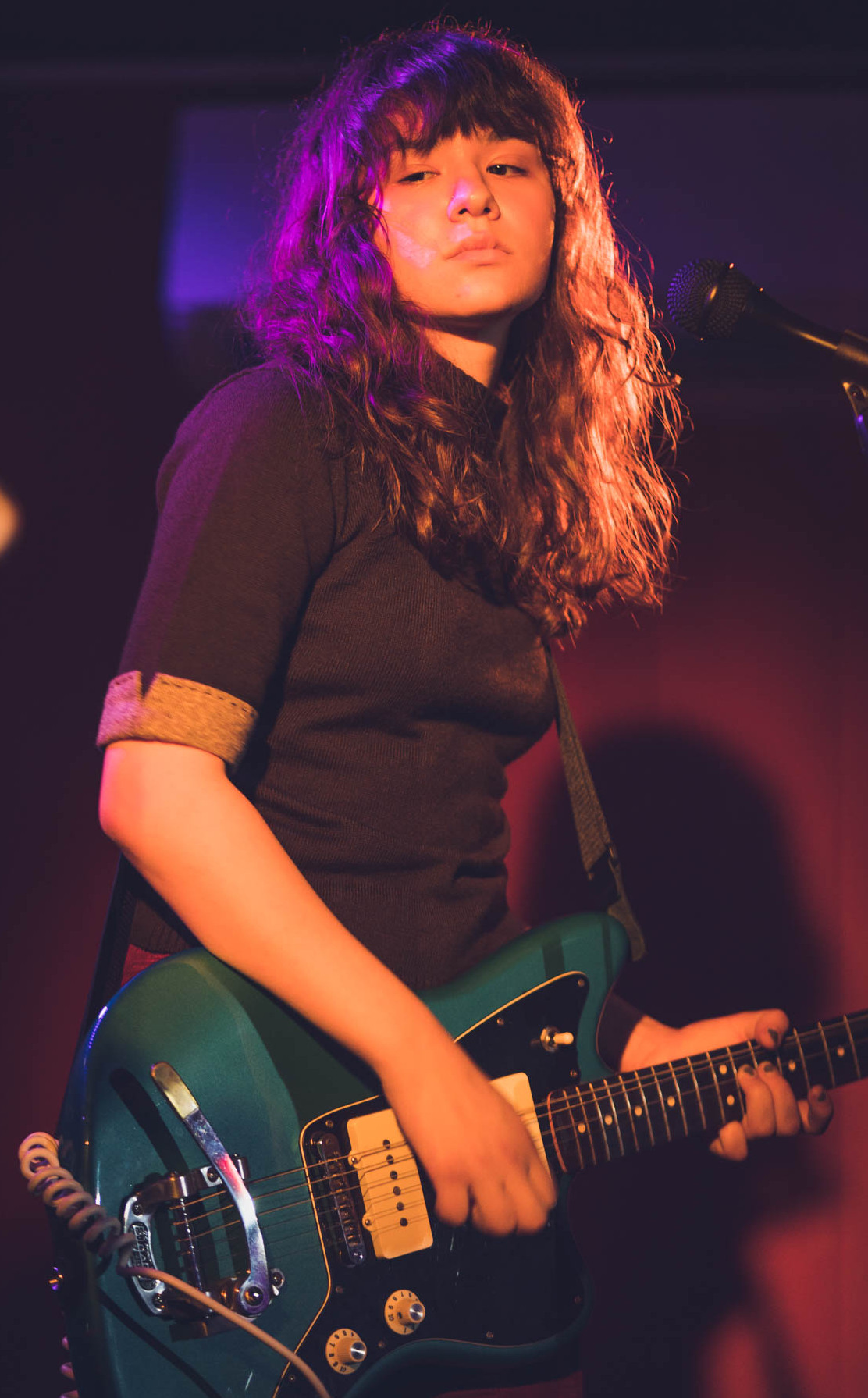
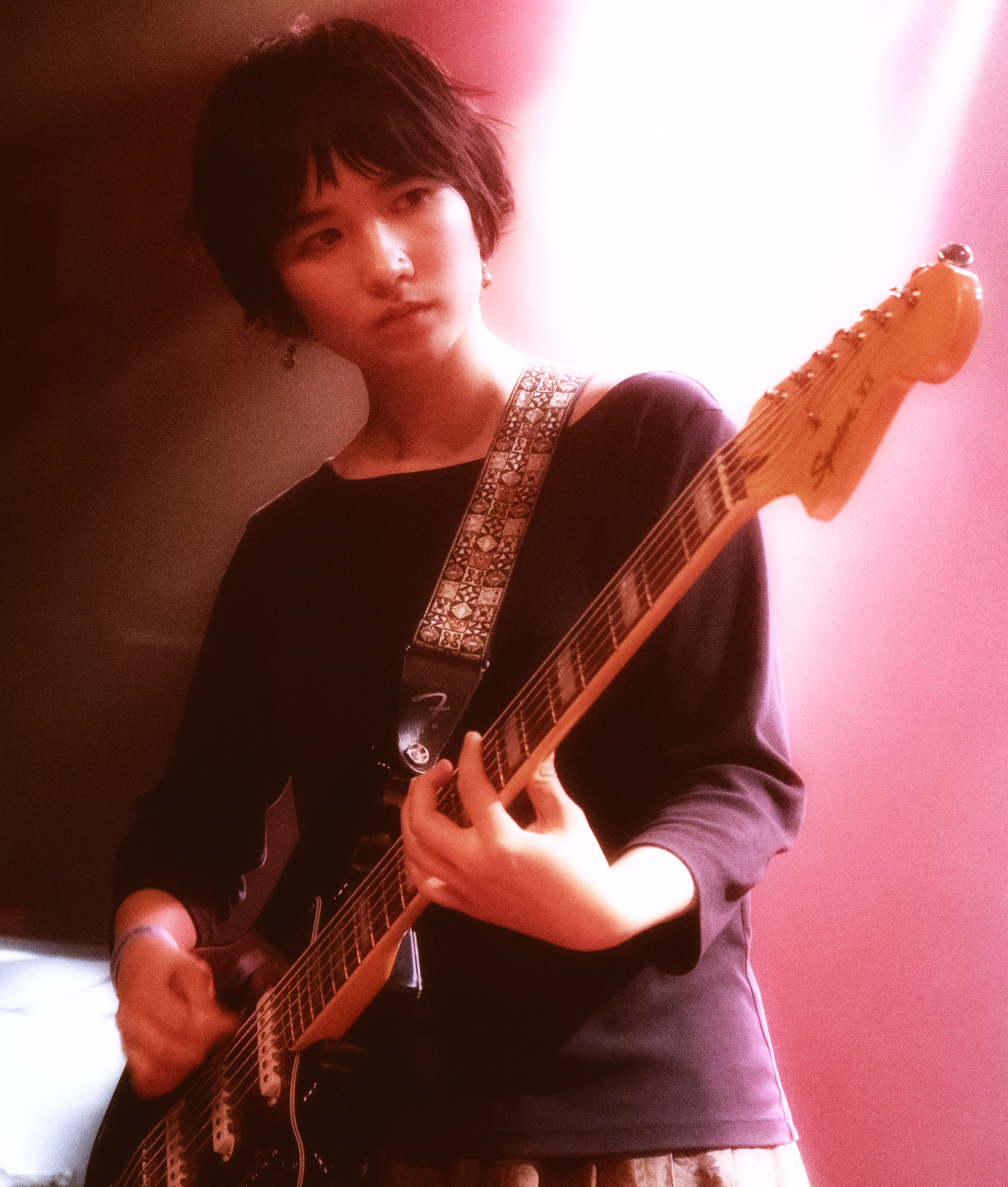
- Horsegirl in 2022 (left: Penelope Lowenstein, right: Nora Cheng)

Background information
- Origin: Chicago, Illinois, U.S.
- Genres: Post-punk; indie rock; jangle pop
- Years active: 2019–present
- Label: Matador
- Members: Nora Cheng; Penelope Lowenstein; Gigi Reece
- Website: horsegirlmusic.com

Horsegirl is an American rock band from Chicago, Illinois, made up of Nora Cheng, Penelope Lowenstein, and Gigi Reece.

In 2021, the group signed to Matador Records. In 2022, they released their debut studio album, Versions of Modern Performance. In 2025, they released their second studio album, Phonetics On and On.

== Biography ==
The group originated in 2019 and they self-released their first song, "Forecast", that year. The group released their first EP, Horsegirl: Ballroom Dance Scene et cetera, through Sonic Cathedral Recordings in 2020. Paste named the EP one of the 25 best EP's of 2020.

In November 2021, the group released another song, "Billy", their first on Matador Records. The song was named one of Rolling Stone's "Songs You Need to Know". Alongside the song, the group released a cover of Minutemen's song "History Lesson – Part II".

On June 3, 2022, the band released their debut album, Versions of Modern Performance, via Matador.

In November 2024, the band released the single "2468" and announced the release of their upcoming studio album, Phonetics On and On, produced by Cate Le Bon. They shared three additional singles prior to the album's release on February 14, 2025: "Julie", "Switch Over", and "Frontrunner".

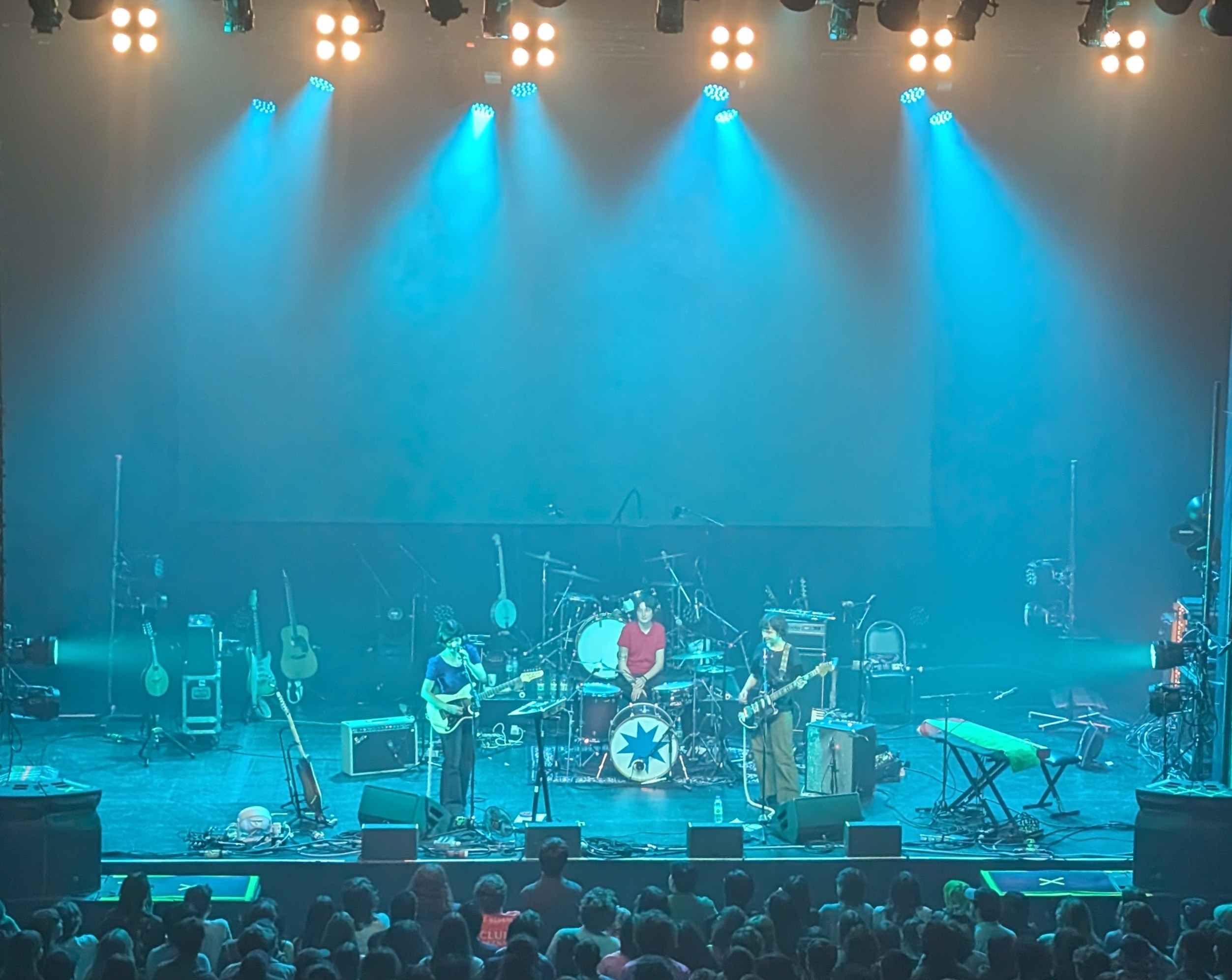
Horsegirl performing at MTELUS in Montreal on June 16, 2026

New York Times music critic Lindsay Zoladz mentioned Phonetics On and On as one of the best albums of 2025.

== Discography ==
Albums

- Versions of Modern Performance (2022)
- Phonetics On and On (2025)

EPs

- Horsegirl: Ballroom Dance Scene (2020)
- Rough Trade Super-Disc (2022)
- Julie In Twos (2025)

Singles

- "Forecast" (2019)
- "Sea Life Sandwich Boy" (2020)
- "Ballroom Dance Scene" (2020)
- "Billy" (2021)
- "Anti-Glory" (2022)
- "World of Pots and Pans" (2022)
- "Dirtbag Transformation (Still Dirty)" (2022)
- "History Lesson - Part II" (2022) (Minutemen cover)
- "2468" (2024)
- "Julie" (2024)
- "Switch Over" (2025)
- "Frontrunner" (2025)
