= Jay Farrar discography =

The Jay Farrar discography covers recordings with Uncle Tupelo, Son Volt, Gob Iron, and as solo artist.

== Albums ==
Year	Artist	Title	Label	Comments
1990	Uncle Tupelo^{1}	No Depression	Rockville	
1991	Uncle Tupelo^{1}	Still Feel Gone	Rockville	
1992	Uncle Tupelo^{1}	March 16-20, 1992	Rockville	
1993	Uncle Tupelo^{2}	Anodyne	Sire	
1995	Son Volt^{3}	Trace	Warner Bros.	
1997	Son Volt^{3}	Straightaways	Warner Bros.	
1998	Son Volt^{3}	Wide Swing Tremolo	Warner Bros.	
2001	Jay Farrar	Sebastopol	Artemis	
2002	Jay Farrar	ThirdShiftGrottoSlack (EP)	Artemis	Outtakes from the Sebastopol sessions
2002	Uncle Tupelo^{1}^{,}^{2}	89/93: An Anthology	Sony	Retrospective compilation including two previously unreleased tracks
2003	Jay Farrar	The Slaughter Rule	Bloodshot Records	film soundtrack
2003	Jay Farrar	Terroir Blues	Act/Resist	
2004	Jay Farrar	Stone, Steel & Bright Lights	Transmit Sound	Live album, includes bonus DVD Live at Slim's
2004	Jay Farrar	Live in Seattle	Transmit Sound	Live album
2005	Son Volt^{3}	A Retrospective: 1995-2000	Warner Bros./Rhino	Retrospective compilation including five previously unreleased tracks
2005	Son Volt^{4}	Okemah and the Melody of Riot	Transmit Sound/Legacy	
2006	Gob Iron^{5}	Death Songs for the Living	Transmit Sound/Legacy	
2007	Son Volt^{4}	The Search	Transmit Sound/Legacy	
2009	Son Volt^{5}	American Central Dust	Rounder/UMGD	
2009	Jay Farrar and Ben Gibbard	One Fast Move or I'm Gone	Atlantic/F-Stop	Collaborative album using the lyrics of Jack Kerouac
2011	Jay Farrar, Will Johnson, Anders Parker, and Yim Yames	New Multitudes	Rounder	Collaborative album using the lyrics of Woody Guthrie
2013	Son Volt	Honky Tonk	Rounder	
2017	Son Volt	Notes of Blue	Transmit Sound/Thirty Tigers	
2019	Son Volt	Union	Transmit Sound	
2021	Son Volt	Electro Melodier	Transmit Sound	
2026	Jay Farrar with Kelly Willis	The Other Bob: a Tribute to Bob Neuwirth		Album of Bob Neuwirth covers

Notes

- ^ Note 1: Uncle Tupelo from 1987 to 1992 included Jay Farrar, Jeff Tweedy and Mike Heidorn
- ^ Note 2: Uncle Tupelo from 1993 to 1994 included Farrar, Tweedy, Ken Coomer, John Stirratt and Max Johnston
- ^ Note 3: Son Volt from 1994 to 1998 included Farrar, Heidorn, Jim Boquist and Dave Boquist
- ^ Note 4: Son Volt from 2005 includes Farrar, Dave Bryson, Andrew Duplantis, Chris Masterson, and Derry De Borja (from 2007)
- ^ Note 5: Gob Iron includes Farrar and Anders Parker
