= A Retrospective: 1995–2000 =

Compilation album by Son Volt
- Released: May 24, 2005
- Genre: Alternative country Alternative rock

Son Volt chronology
Wide Swing Tremolo (1998)	A Retrospective: 1995–2000 (2005)	Okemah and the Melody of Riot (2005)

Professional ratings
Review scores
Source	Rating
Allmusic	link
The Guardian	link
Mojo	link
The Music Box	link
No Depression	(positive) link
Pitchfork Media	(6.7/10) link
PopMatters	link
Prefix Magazine	(positive) link

A Retrospective: 1995–2000 is a compilation album of past works by American rock band Son Volt.

== Track listing ==
All tracks are written by Jay Farrar, except where otherwise stated.

No.	Title	Writer(s)	Length
1.	"Drown" (from Trace)
2.	"Windfall" (from Trace)
3.	"Route" (from Trace)
4.	"Rex's Blues" (from Red Hot + Bothered)	Townes Van Zandt
5.	"Looking at the World Through a Windshield" (from Feeling Minnesota soundtrack)	Jerry Chesnut/Mike Hoyer
6.	"Too Early" (from Trace)
7.	"Back into Your World" (from Straightaways)
8.	"Picking Up the Signal" (from Straightaways)
9.	"I've Got to Know" (previously unissued)	Woody Guthrie
10.	"Creosote" (from Straightaways)
11.	"Straightface" (from Wide Swing Tremolo)
12.	"Tulsa County" (from Switchback Promo EP)	Pamela Polland
13.	"Driving the View" (from Wide Swing Tremolo)
14.	"Ain't No More Cane" (previously unissued)	Huddie Ledbetter
15.	"Flow" (from Wide Swing Tremolo)
16.	"Holocaust" (from Straightface Promo EP)	Alex Chilton
17.	"Tear Stained Eye" (4 Track Demo, previously unissued)
18.	"Loose String" (4 Track Demo, previously unissued)
19.	"Medicine Hat" (recorded live at Acoustic Café, previously unissued)
20.	"Open All Night" (from Badlands: A Tribute to Bruce Springsteen's Nebraska)	Bruce Springsteen
