= Electro Melodier =

Studio album by Son Volt
- Released: July 30, 2021
- Studios: Red Pill (St. Louis, Missouri, US)
- Length: 54:54
- Language: English
- Labels: Transmit Sound; Thirty Tigers
- Producer: Jay Farrar

Son Volt chronology
Union (2019)	Electro Melodier (2021)	Day of the Doug (2023)

Electro Melodier is the tenth studio album by the American alternative country band Son Volt. The album has received positive reviews from critics.

== Reception ==
Electro Melodier has received positive reviews from critics, as noted by the review aggregator Metacritic, where it holds a weighted average score of 78 out of 100 based on six reviews. Editors at AllMusic rated this album 3.5 out of 5 stars. Critic Mark Deming remarked that this is a better exploration of politics than 2019's Union and that frontman Jay Farrar "has something to say and he says it with intelligence and eloquence". American Songwriter's Lee Zimmerman rated Electro Melodier 4 out of 5 stars, summing up "for all the angst it musters, Electro Melodier is still a reasonably emphatic effort, one with a drive and determination that never finds cause to falter". In Glide Magazine, Doug Collette writes that "it’s no small accomplishment to remain distinctly stylish, within the stability of the current lineup, especially in such tumultuous times as these" and the band "arises from arrangements that are as crisp and potent as the playing, which in itself is as intelligently wrought as the material". Sylvie Simmons of Mojo rates this release 4 out of 5 stars, writing that "there is plenty going on" musically. Eric R. Danton of Paste rated this album 7.0 out of 10, stating that this album retains the band's "unmistakable" sound, showcasing "subtly engrossing work of a songwriter who continues to hone his craft, and shift his worldview". Writing for PopMatters, Gary Schwind gave a 7 out of 10 rating for having "a lot of what you’ve always loved about the band" with "thought-provoking lyrics". Finally, Uncut published two contrasting reviews: one by Spencer Grady scoring Electro Melodier 2 out of 5 stars, writing that the music "holds few surprises and fewer frills", and a second review by Rob Hughes was 4 stars, praising the lyrics as "finely weighted between anguish and hope" and stating that the album is "ultimately mindful of counting life’s blessings".

== Track listing ==
1. "Reverie" – 3:36
2. "Arkey Blue" – 4:18
3. "The Globe" – 3:38
4. "Diamonds and Cigarettes" – 3:55
5. "Lucky Ones" – 5:17
6. "War on Misery" – 5:07
7. "Living in the USA" – 4:54
8. "Someday Is Now" – 3:34
9. "Sweet Refrain" – 3:23
10. "The Levee on Down" – 3:23
11. "These Are the Times" – 3:09
12. "Rebetika" – 2:45
13. "The Globe / Prelude" – 3:37
14. "Like You" – 4:24

== Personnel ==
Son Volt

- Andrew Duplantis – bass guitar, vocals
- Jay Farrar – acoustic guitar, electric guitar, piano, vocals, production
- Chris Frame – bazouki, electric guitar
- Mark Patterson – drums, percussion
- Mark Spencer – baritone guitar, electric guitar, lap steel guitar, keyboards, organ, piano, Weissenborn, percussion, backing vocals, engineering, assistant production

Additional personnel

- John Agnello – mixing
- Laura Cantrell – backing vocals
- Jacob Detering – harmonium, engineering, mixing, assistant production
- Joe Meyer – brushes
- Ismael Quintanilla III – photography
- Brad Sarno – mastering
- David Schwartz – design, layout
- Michael "Smitty" Smith – mastering
- James Stevens – engineering
- Andy Taub – engineering

== See also ==
- List of 2021 albums
