= Day of the Doug =

Studio album by Son Volt
- Released: June 16, 2023
- Studios: Red Pill Studio, St. Louis, Missouri, United States
- Genre: Alternative country
- Length: 39:32
- Language: English
- Label: Transmit Sound/Thirty Tigers
- Producer: Jay Farrar

Son Volt chronology
Electro Melodier (2021)	Day of the Doug (2023)	Sound Signal Serenades (2026)

Doug was always an inspiration, and he's an icon in that he represented his own way.

— Jay Farrar on the impact of Doug Sahm.

Day of the Doug is the eleventh studio album by the American alternative country band Son Volt. The tribute album to Tex-Mex musician Doug Sahm was conceived by frontman Jay Farrar who listened to Sahm's music during the COVID-19 pandemic and has received positive reviews from critics.

== Reception ==
Writing for Glide Magazine, Doug Collette considers this release is "twelve songs [that] accurately reflect the eclectic range of style for the object of their affection employed on [Doug Sahm]'s own records" and that Son Volt's "best intentions come to full fruition". In No Depression, Peter Blackstock praises the contributions of bassist Andrew Duplantis and considers the track listing for this album "refreshingly adventurous". Editors at AllMusic included this on their list of favorite folk and Americana albums of 2023.

== Track listing ==
No.	Title	Length
1.	"Doug Intro"	0:18
2.	"Sometimes You've Got to Stop Chasing Rainbows"	2:56
3.	"What About Tomorrow"	2:22
4.	"Beautiful Texas Sunshine"	3:10
5.	"Float Away"	3:17
6.	"Yesterday Got in the Way"	3:51
7.	"Keep Your Soul"	3:24
8.	"Dynamite Woman"	3:52
9.	"Huggin' Thin Air"	3:01
10.	"Juan Mendoza"	3:35
11.	"Poison Love"	3:27
12.	"Seguin"	2:56
13.	"It's Gonna Be Easy"	3:08
14.	"Doug Outro"	0:14

== Personnel ==
Son Volt

- Andrew Duplantis – bass guitar, vocals
- Jay Farrar – guitar, vocals, production
- John Horton – bass guitar, guitar, slide guitar, baritone guitar
- Mark Patterson – drums, percussion
- Mark Spencer – guitar, keyboards, backing vocals, photography

Additional personnel

- John Agnello – mixing
- Jacob Detering – engineering, mixing, production assistance, band photograph
- Gary Hunt – fiddle
- Sam Ohlhausen – engineering
- Brad Sarno – pedal steel guitar, mastering
- David Schwartz – art direction, artwork, back cover, layout
- Mike "Smitty" Smith – mastering
- Chuck Wagner – artwork, cover art
- Adam White – percussion

== See also ==
- List of 2023 albums
