= Sound Signal Serenades =

2026 studio album by Son Volt

Studio album by Son Volt
- Released: April 18, 2026
- Studios: Red Pill (St. Louis); King Electric (Austin); Tape Kitchen (Brooklyn)
- Genres: Alternative country; folk rock
- Length: 40:33
- Labels: Transmit; Thirty Tigers
- Producer: Jay Farrar

Son Volt chronology
Day of the Doug (2023)	Sound Signal Serenades (2026)

Sound Signal Serenades is the twelfth studio album by the American alternative country band Son Volt, released on April 18, 2026, via Transmit Sound and Thirty Tigers. The album consists of twelve original songs by Jay Farrar that were first released to members of the Electro Melodier Society during 2025.

== Background and release ==
The album collects twelve songs that were exclusively released through the Electro Melodier Society in 2025. The fan club, launched in January 2025, included weekly exclusive content throughout the year including new songs, unreleased demos, live recordings, and episodes of Farrar's radio show.

Coinciding with Record Store Day 2026, the album was first released on April 18, 2026, as an exclusive LP, pressed on opaque sky blue vinyl and limited to 3,000 copies. A general release followed on August 28, 2026. Son Volt toured in support of the album, including a sold-out hometown show at Delmar Hall in St. Louis on September 25, 2026.

== Reception ==
Writing for All About Jazz, Doug Collette observed that the band's sound has grown more sophisticated since their 1995 debut Trace, while remaining rooted in their rock, country, gospel, and folk influences. He credited Farrar's work as producer for giving the record a sense of momentum despite it having been recorded in multiple locations with different engineering teams. The German music site Gaesteliste.de described the album as Americana, folk, and country rock that moves between melancholy, hard-won wisdom, and optimism, singling out the tracks "The New Low-Down", "This Mess of a World", and "Guardian Angel". Tinnitist made it their albumn of the week in August 2028.

Professional ratings
Review scores
Source	Rating
AllMusic	4/5 stars
Country Universe	3/5 stars
Tótum Revolutum Press	7.2/10 stars

== Track listing ==
All tracks are written by Jay Farrar.

Sound Signal Serenade track listing
No.	Title	Length
1.	"Kaleidosphere (Devil His Due)"	3:09
2.	"Away from the Blues"	3:26
3.	"Serenade Song"	4:02
4.	"Don Quixote's Dream"	3:48
5.	"The High Wall/Carnival Country"	2:23
6.	"Hurricane Eye"	3:51
7.	"The New Low-Down"	2:34
8.	"This Mess of a World"	2:08
9.	"Walkin' in a Maze"	3:05
10.	"Illinois Central"	4:45
11.	"Guardian Angel"	3:06
12.	"New Born Soul"	4:16
Total length:		40:33

== Personnel ==
These credits are adapted from the album's liner notes.

=== Son Volt ===
- Jay Farrar – vocal, acoustic guitar, lap steel, piano, production
- Andrew Duplantis – bass, backing vocals
- John Horton – electric guitar, slide guitar, baritone guitar
- Mark Patterson – drums, percussion
- Mark Spencer – backing vocals, electric guitar, acoustic slide guitar, keyboards, additional recording

=== Additional personnel ===
- Jacob Detering – production assistance (all tracks), mixing (3, 5, 6, 10, 12)
- Justin Douglas – production assistance, pre-mastering (all tracks); mixing (4, 7, 9)
- John Agnello – mixing (1, 2, 8, 11)
- David Dolger Schwartz – art direction, layout
- Bob Burman – cover photograph
- Sam Ohlhausen – band photograph

== See also ==
- List of 2026 albums (July–December)
