= Former Lives =

Studio album by Benjamin Gibbard
- Released: October 16, 2012
- Genre: Pop; rock
- Length: 36:42
- Label: Barsuk
- Producer: Aaron Espinoza; Ben Gibbard

Benjamin Gibbard chronology
One Fast Move or I'm Gone (with Jay Farrar) (2009)	Former Lives (2012)

Professional ratings
Aggregate scores
Source	Rating
Metacritic	70/100
Review scores
Source	Rating
AbsolutePunk	89%
Allmusic	2.5/5 stars
American Songwriter	3.5/5 stars
Earbuddy	(6.5/10)
Entertainment Weekly	B+
LA Times	2.5/5 stars
PopMatters	6/10
Rolling Stone	3.5/5 stars
Sputnikmusic	3.5/5
Under the Radar	7/10

Former Lives is the debut solo album by Death Cab for Cutie lead singer Ben Gibbard. It was released in October 2012 under Barsuk Records.

Many of the album's tracks feature Gibbard playing all instruments by himself. Aaron Espinoza is credited as producer for all tracks except 1, 5, 10, 11, and 12. Other guest musicians include Jon Wurster, Mark Spencer, Aimee Mann, and Zooey Deschanel.

== Track list ==
All songs written by Ben Gibbard, except where noted.

No.	Title	Writer(s)	Length
1.	"Shepherd's Bush Lullaby"		0:50
2.	"Dream Song"		3:33
3.	"Teardrop Windows"		2:47
4.	"Bigger Than Love"		4:47
5.	"Lily"		2:00
6.	"Something's Rattling (Cowpoke)"		3:51
7.	"Duncan, Where Have You Gone?"		3:46
8.	"Oh, Woe"		2:50
9.	"A Hard One to Know"		2:40
10.	"Lady Adelaide"	Gibbard, Stan Jones	3:33
11.	"Broken Yolk in Western Sky"		3:32
12.	"I'm Building a Fire"		2:33

== Charts ==
Chart (2012)	Peak position
US Billboard 200	34
US Independent Albums (Billboard)	7
US Top Alternative Albums (Billboard)	8
US Top Rock Albums (Billboard)	11
