= Union (Son Volt album) =

Studio album by Son Volt
- Released: March 29, 2019
- Studios: Blue Jade Audio, St. Louis, Missouri, United States; Mother Jones Museum, Illinois, United States; Red Pill Studio, St. Louis, Missouri, United States; Woody Guthrie Center, Tulsa, Oklahoma, United States
- Genre: Alternative country
- Length: 39:12
- Language: English
- Label: Transmit Sound/Thirty Tigers
- Producer: Jay Farrar

Son Volt chronology
Notes of Blue (2017)	Union (2019)	Electro Melodier (2021)

Union is the ninth studio album by the American alternative country band Son Volt.

== Reception ==
Union received positive reviews from critics noted at review aggregator Metacritic. It has a weighted average score of 68 out of 100, based on six reviews. Editors at AllMusic rated this album 3.5 out of 5 stars, with critic Mark Deming writing that this album finds frontman Jay Farrar "singing about the specifics of a divided nation in a way he never has before" and characterizes this release as "a brave experiment and a sincere effort to explore new creative avenues, but it's a long way from a rousing success". Writing for American Songwriter, Hal Horowitz gave this album 2 out of 5 stars, stating that "there are some insightful concepts at work in these 13 tracks", but the songs "are dreary, similar sounding (to each other and much of the rest of Son Volt’s catalog) and generally just bland", and he blames Farrar's production. A review in Glide Magazine proposes that "it should prove timeless and, appropriately enough, of a piece with the best work of Jay Farrar’s estimable career". Paste's Lee Zimmerman rated this album a 6.8 out of 10, summing up that "With the majority of the songs maintaining a steady stride, Farrar shares his conviction with authority and insistence. Those are the qualities that allow Union to remain true to its common core." Justin Cober-Lake of PopMatters scored Union a 6 out of 10, criticizing Farrar's contributions and the pacing of some tracks, but writing "the band rarely feels stuck" and is "as tight as ever, relaxed but always strong".

== Track listing ==
1. "While Rome Burns" – 2:15
2. "The 99" – 3:30
3. "Devil May Care" – 2:58
4. "Broadsides" – 3:37
5. "Reality Winner" – 4:33
6. "Union" – 3:39
7. "The Reason" – 4:00
8. "Lady Liberty" – 1:24
9. "Holding Your Own" – 3:00
10. "Truth to Power Blues" – 1:15
11. "Rebel Girl" – 3:16
12. "Slow Burn" – 2:10
13. "The Symbol" – 3:36

== Personnel ==
Son Volt

- Andrew Duplantis – bass guitar, backing vocals
- Jay Farrar – acoustic guitar, baritone guitar, vocals, arrangement, cover photo, images, production
- Chris Frame – 12-string electric guitar, baritone guitar, electric guitar
- Mark Patterson – drums, percussion
- Mark Spencer – acoustic slide guitar, lap steel guitar, piano, organ, backing vocals

Additional personnel

- John Agnello – mixing
- Jacob Detering – engineering, mixing assistance, production assistance, images
- David McClister – images, photography
- Brad Sarno – mastering
- David Schwartz – design, layout

== See also ==
- List of 2019 albums
