= New Multitudes =

2012 Woody Guthrie tribute album

Studio album by Jay Farrar, Will Johnson, Anders Parker, and Yim Yames
- Released: February 28, 2012
- Recorded: 2006 and 2009–2011
- Studios: Brooklyn, New York City and East St. Louis, Illinois, US
- Genres: Folk rock, alternative country
- Length: 49:17
- Language: English
- Label: Rounder
- Producers: Farrar, Johnson, Parker, and Yames

Jay Farrar chronology
One Fast Move or I'm Gone (2009)	New Multitudes (2012)

Will Johnson chronology
Molina and Johnson (2009)	New Multitudes (2012)	Scorpion (2012)

Anders Parker chronology
Cross Latitudes (2010)	New Multitudes (2012)	There's a Blue Bird in My Heart (2014)

Yim Yames chronology
Tribute To (2009)	New Multitudes (2012)	Regions of Light and Sound of God (2013)

New Multitudes is a Woody Guthrie tribute album performed by Jay Farrar, Will Johnson, Anders Parker, and Yim Yames to commemorate the 100th anniversary of Guthrie's birth, released through Rounder Records on February 28, 2012. The project was initiated by Woody's daughter Nora Guthrie to have Farrar add music to her father's lyrics—specifically, his earliest songwriting years in Los Angeles. Over the course of several years, he invited the others to collaborate and recorded at a variety of locations across the United States. Each artist wrote music to lyrics that inspired him and presented it to the collaborators for recording. The result is an album with diverse musical genres that has garnered positive reviews from critics for its varied styles and instrumentation. The quartet promoted the album with a small promotional tour that took them to record stores, radio programs, theaters, and folk festivals. The group has plans for releasing a second volume.

== Development and recording ==
The Woody Guthrie foundation has preserved scraps of over 3,000 lyrics that Guthrie handwrote in notebooks and on scrap paper.

New Multitudes is one of several tribute albums for American folk singer-songwriter Woody Guthrie. Guthrie died in 1967 after an extended battle with Huntington's disease, but his abbreviated career helped to inspire innumerable musicians during his lifetime as well as in the 1960s folk revival movement. Farrar was initially invited to collaborate with Bragg on the Mermaid Avenue sessions in 1995, but felt uncomfortable working on the material with someone else. Warner Bros. Records wanted all of Son Volt to collaborate with Bragg, but after Farrar declined, he kept the idea in mind. In 2006, he approached Nora Guthrie about returning to her father's lyrics and she agreed.

To write his own batch of songs, Farrar looked through several of the over 3,000 handwritten lyrics that Guthrie's estate has preserved before incidentally focusing on his California period. The connection to Guthrie's Los Angeles years was accidental—Farrar simply chose lyrics that he found compelling and Nora pointed out that they came from a relatively brief period of her father's life when he lived in Los Angeles. He also made a conscious decision to write instrumentation in a style more similar to Guthrie's than other tribute projects, such as The Klezmatics' klezmer-based Woody Guthrie's Happy Joyous Hanukkah and Wonder Wheel. Farrar had never listened to the Bragg and Wilco material to ensure that his songwriting would not be influenced by it.

Immediately before going to the Archives in autumn 2006, Farrar invited his Gob Iron collaborator Anders Parker to come with him and look over potential material and the two returned several times over a period of months gathering lyrics for composition before recording together starting on July 14, 2007. As they found lyrics that interested them, they had reproductions mailed to their homes from the Archives to work on the material at their leisure. The duo finished recording several songs throughout the year but did not have enough material to complete the album. The recordings were also made without a budget or record contract for release.

Nora Guthrie played some of the 2009 recordings for Yames and Farrar invited him to join the duo after discovering that he had visited the Archives as well. Yames wrote the tune for "Hoping Machine" and suggested that fellow Monsters of Folk collaborator Johnson accompany them. Farrar mailed Johnson some lyrics and he composed "Chorine My Sheba Queen" that afternoon, while Yames was attracted to the lyrics of "Empty Bed Blues" while recovering from an injury. Once the entire quartet had composed songs, they entered studios in Brooklyn and East St. Louis throughout 2009 and 2010, recording songs with live vocals in one or two takes, crowding around a single microphone. The group attempted to have the recordings ready for a 2011 release, but had to finish the album too late in the year.

Farrar has characterized the songwriting process for this album as easier than his typical work composing new lyrics as it allowed him to be less self-conscious.

== Tour ==
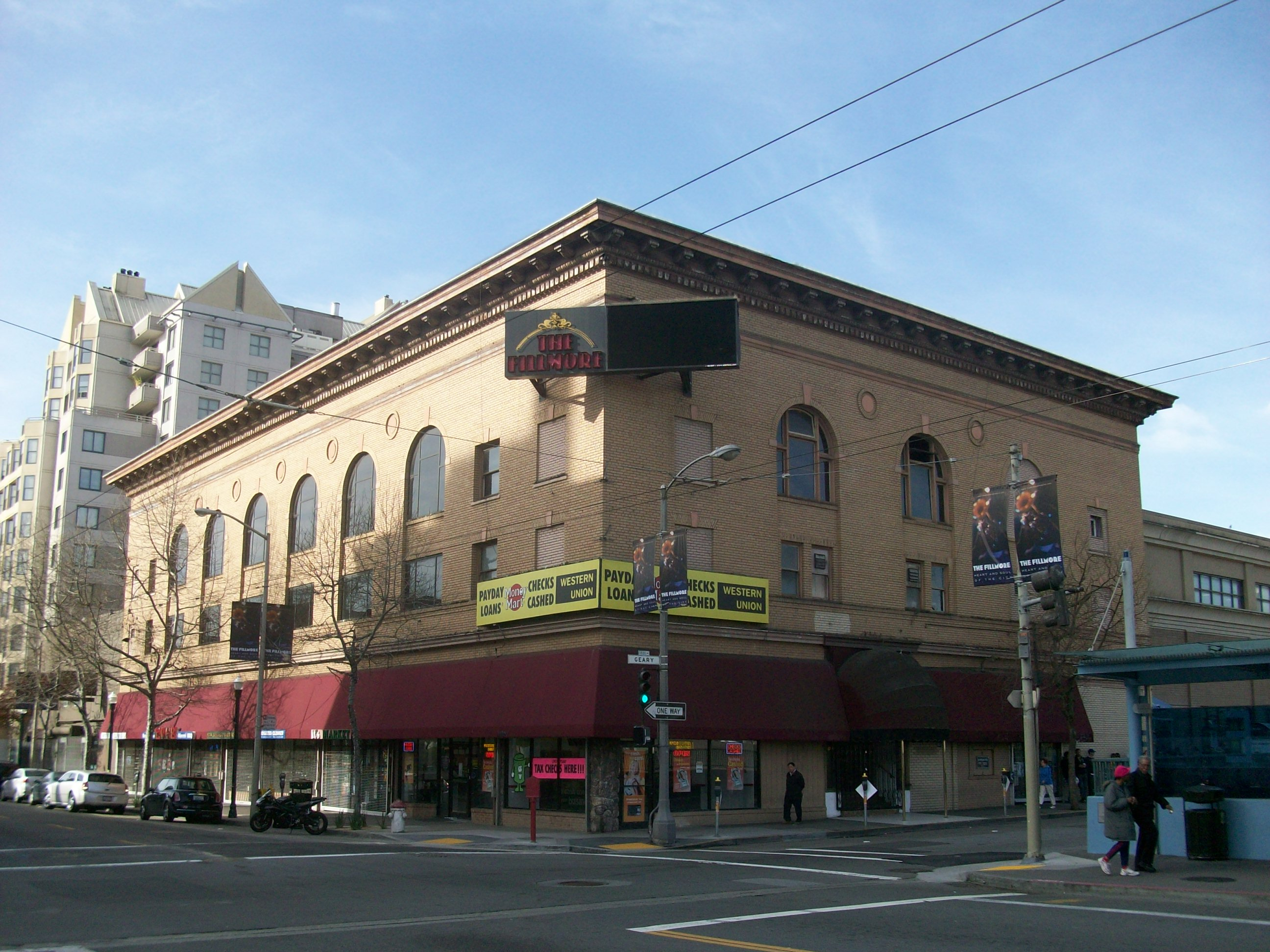
The New Multitudes Tour began at San Francisco's Fillmore Auditorium.

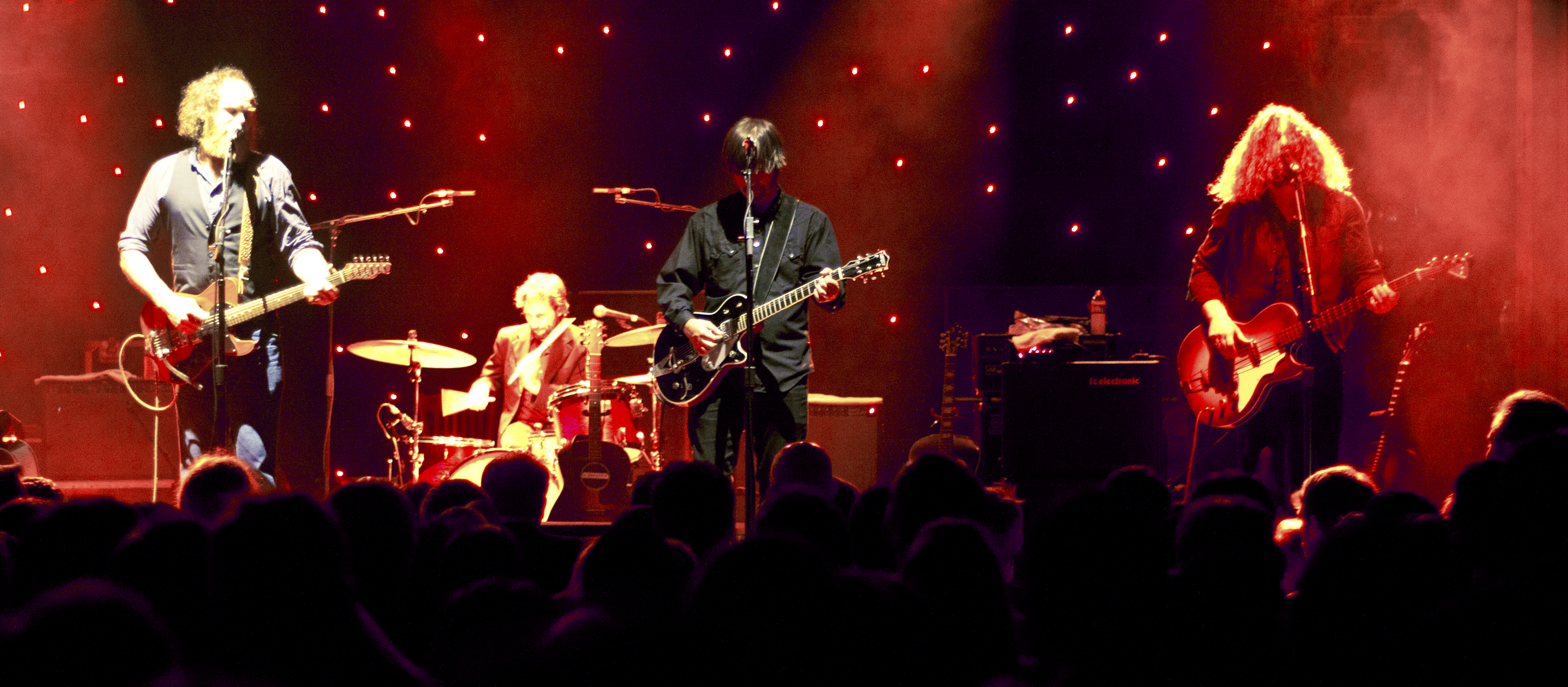
The brief promotional tour to accompany the album found the New Multitudes performers playing Webster Hall in New York City (from left to right: Anders Parker, Will Johnson [drumming], Jay Farrar, and Yim Yames).

The quartet toured the United States to support the album, playing all of the groups' Guthrie compositions as well as some solo work. Bobby Bare, Jr. and Sarah Jaffe opened for them. Early in the tour, the group discussed reconvening for further dates, but decided to cap their initial outing with the Newport Folk Festival.

The performers also released a four-track 10" single "Let's Multiply" exclusive for Record Store Day.

=== Members ===
- Jay Farrar – lead guitar, vocals
- Will Johnson – drums, rhythm guitar, vocals
- Anders Parker – drums, rhythm guitar, vocals
- Yim Yames – bass guitar, vocals

=== Dates ===
New Multitudes tour dates
Date	City	Country	Venue
January 25, 2012	Glasgow	United Kingdom	Celtic Connections at Glasgow Royal Concert Hall
March 6, 2012	San Francisco	United States	The Fillmore
March 7, 2012	Los Angeles	United States	Music Box Theater
March 8, 2012	Los Angeles	United States	Amoeba Music in Los Angeles
March 8, 2012	Santa Monica	United States	KCRW Studios (Morning Becomes Eclectic)
March 9, 2012	Portland	United States	Crystal Ballroom
March 10, 2012	Seattle	United States	Showbox at the Market
March 12, 2012	Alexandria	United States	The Birchmere
March 13, 2012	Philadelphia	United States	Union Transfer
March 14, 2012	New York City	United States	Webster Hall
March 16, 2012	Boston	United States	Paradise Rock Club
July 29, 2012	Newport	United States	Newport Folk Festival at Fort Adams State Park

Additionally, Parker performed some of the New Multitudes material at the initial benefit concert SwitchPoint hosted by IntraHealth International in Saxapahaw, North Carolina on April 20.

=== Response ===
The tour was well-received, with The New York Times critic Nate Chinen describing their Webster Hall performance as familiar, but with a unique confluence of styles from each lyricist, from Yames' "hazy magnetism" to Parker's "straightforward folk-rock earnestness." The Philadelphia Inquirer's review by Sam Adams praised the performers by concluding that "all four musicians are worthy of following in Guthrie's footsteps, each in his own distinctive way."

== Reception ==
=== Critical reception ===
Professional ratings
Aggregate scores
Source	Rating
Metacritic	81/100
Review scores
Source	Rating
AllMusic	3.5/5 stars
All About Jazz	4.5/5 stars
American Songwriter	3.5/5 stars
The A.V. Club	A−
Los Angeles Times	3/4 stars
Mojo	4/5 stars
musicOMH	4/5 stars
The New Zealand Herald	4.5/5 stars
PopMatters	8/10
Rolling Stone	3/5 stars

The album has received generally positive reviews from critics. At Metacritic, which assigns a normalized rating out of 100 to reviews from mainstream critics, the album received an average score of 81, based on 13 reviews, which indicates "generally favorable reviews". MusicOMH's Max Raymond has praised the album as being "engrossing" due to the emotional depth of the lyrics as well as the warm and relaxed sound of the studio recording. Will Hermes of Rolling Stone gave the album a mixed review, praising the vocal harmonies. The diversity in sound was highlighted by AbsolutePunk's Gregory Robson, Jason Schneider of Exclaim! and The A.V. Club's Chris Martins, ranging from electric blues to psychedelia as well as the atypical lyrics from Guthrie—focusing on the city of Los Angeles rather than his communist-leaning politics and Dustbowl tragedy narratives. American Songwriter's Evan Schlansky noted the same apolitical tone of the lyrics, but qualified that with Yames' delivery on "My Revolutionary Mind". He praised the album's diversity as a strength, allowing each vocalist an opportunity to display his unique talents. Writing for Los Angeles Times, Randy Lewis agrees that the songwriting diversity is a strength, comparing individual tracks with R.E.M., The Velvet Underground, Richard Thompson, and John Mellencamp. Graham Reid of The New Zealand Herald also notes similarities to R.E.M., fellow Guthrie admirer Bob Dylan, The Byrds, and Eagles. The PopMatters review by Jeff Strowe points out the blues influences in the album, adding to its emotional depth. About.com's Kim Ruehl has criticized the diversity and complexity of the album as contrary to the simplicity of Guthrie's actual recordings, concluding that "If this weren't presented so staunchly as being at least part 'Woody Guthrie album,' it might be a little easier to swallow." Doug Collette of All About Jazz also reviewed the deluxe edition bonus disc, comparing it favorably to the proper album as well as the previous Farrar–Parker collaboration Gob Iron. The album topped American publication Billboard's Heatseekers.

=== Sales and chart performance ===
Sales chart performance for New Multitudes
Chart (2012)	Peak
Dutch Alternative Albums (MegaCharts)	23
US Billboard 200	117
US Americana/Folk Albums (Billboard)	5
US Heatseekers Albums (Billboard)	1
US Top Rock Albums (Billboard)	27

== Track listing ==
All lyrics written by Woody Guthrie, all lead vocals by co-writer.

1. "Hoping Machine" (Farrar) – 4:52
2. "Fly High" (Parker) – 3:45
3. "My Revolutionary Mind" (Yames) – 4:43
4. "VD City" (Johnson) – 4:05
5. "Old L.A." (Parker) – 3:03
6. "Talking Empty Bed Blues" (Yames) – 4:09
7. "Chorine My Sheba Queen" (Johnson) – 4:50
8. "Careless Reckless Love" (Farrar) – 5:01
9. "Angel's Blues" (Parker) – 4:38
10. "No Fear" (Johnson) – 3:36
11. "Changing World" (Yames) – 3:48
12. "New Multitudes" (Farrar) – 2:47

Limited edition bonus disc All music written and performed by Farrar and Parker.

1. "Around New York" – 0:51
2. "Jake Walk Blues" – 1:59
3. "Whereabouts Can I Hide" – 2:51
4. "Old Kokaine" – 3:04
5. "I Was a Goner" – 3:42
6. "San Antone Meat House" – 3:59
7. "Dopefiend Robber" – 4:41
8. "World's On Fire" – 3:12
9. "When I Get Home" – 3:51
10. "Atom Dance" – 2:34
11. "Your Smile Cured Me" – 2:41

== Personnel ==
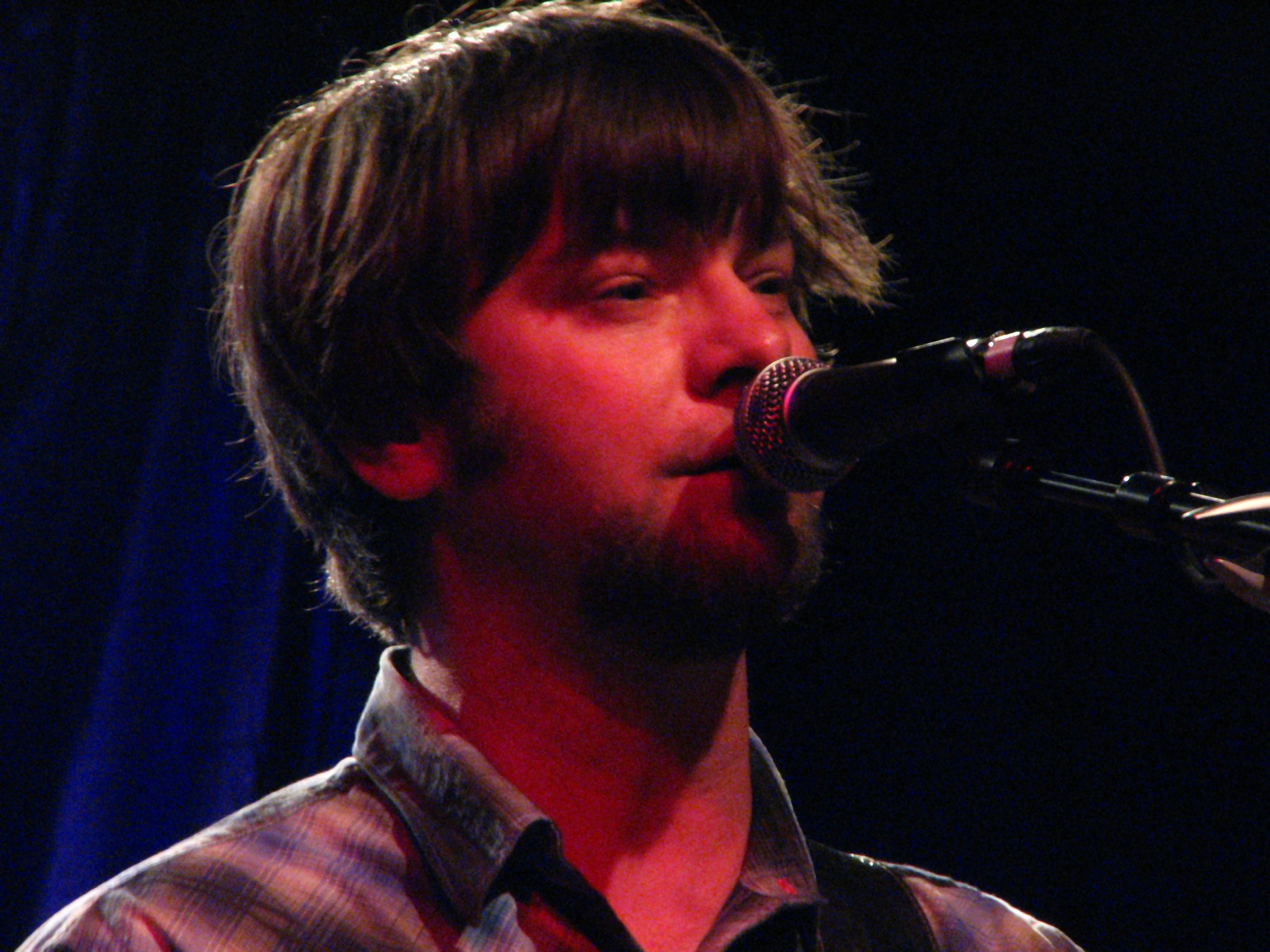
New Multitudes was originally a Farrar solo project and the third volume in the Mermaid Avenue series begun by Billy Bragg and Wilco

- Woody Guthrie – artwork, lyrics
- Jay Farrar – vocals, guitar, composition, production
- Will Johnson – vocals, guitar, saw on "Chorine My Sheba Queen", composition, production
- Anders Parker – vocals, guitar, composition, production
- Yim Yames – vocals, guitar, bass guitar, composition, production

Technical

- John Agnello – mixing
- Larissa Collins – art direction, package design
- Mike Martin – engineering
- Matt Pence – mixing
- Kevin Ratterman – mixing
- Brad Sarno – mastering
- Mark Spencer – mixing
- Anna Webber – photography

Additional musicians

- Buck Carter
- Jimmy Griffin
- Creston Lea
- Konrad Meissner

== See also ==
- Mermaid Avenue (1998)
- Man in the Sand (1999)
- Mermaid Avenue Vol. II (2000)
- Wonder Wheel (2006)
- Woody Guthrie's Happy Joyous Hanukkah (2006)
- The Works (2008)
- Mermaid Avenue: The Complete Sessions (2012)
- Lost on the River: The New Basement Tapes (2014), a similar project using Bob Dylan lyrics also featuring Jim James
- Monsters of Folk, another supergroup with Johnson and James
