= Live in Seattle =

Live in Seattle may refer to:

- Live in Seattle (John Coltrane album), a 1965 album by jazz musician John Coltrane
- Live in Seattle (Shawn McDonald album), the first live album by singer/songwriter Shawn McDonald
- Live in Seattle (Jay Farrar album), a live recording by Jay Farrar, along with Eric Heywood and Mark Spencer
- Live in Seattle (Kind of Like Spitting album), a Kind of Like Spitting album
- Live in Seattle (Zony Mash album), a live recording by Wayne Horvitz' band Zony Mash
