= One Fast Move or I'm Gone =

One Fast Move or I'm Gone: Music From Kerouac's Big Sur

Studio album by Jay Farrar and Benjamin Gibbard
- Released: October 20, 2009
- Label: Atlantic

Jay Farrar chronology
Live in Seattle (2004)	One Fast Move or I'm Gone: Music From Kerouac's Big Sur (2009)	New Multitudes (2011)

Benjamin Gibbard chronology
One Fast Move or I'm Gone (2009)	Former Lives (2012)

Professional ratings
Review scores
Source	Rating
Allmusic	3.5/5 stars

One Fast Move or I'm Gone: Kerouac's Big Sur is an album by Ben Gibbard (Death Cab for Cutie) and Jay Farrar (Son Volt), released in 2009. The lyrics are based on the prose of Jack Kerouac's novel Big Sur (1962). One Fast Move or I'm Gone was a result of Gibbard's and Farrar's mutual appreciation for Kerouac's work while recording several songs for a feature-length documentary of the same name. Jim Sampas, who was a producer of the film, was executive producer of the album.

== Track listing ==
1. "California Zephyr"
2. "Low Life Kingdom"
3. "Willamine"
4. "All in One"
5. "Breathe Our Iodine"
6. "These Roads Don't Move"
7. "Big Sur"
8. "One Fast Move or I'm Gone"
9. "Final Horrors"
10. "Sea Engines"
11. "The Void"
12. "San Francisco"
