= The Crying Tree =

Studio album by Blood Oranges
- Released: 1994
- Genre: Country music
- Label: East Side Digital
- Producer: Eric Ambel

Blood Oranges chronology
Corn River (1990)	The Crying Tree (1994)

The Crying Tree is the second and final studio album by Boston, Massachusetts–based alternative country band Blood Oranges. It was released in 1994 on the East Side Digital label, and was produced by Eric Ambel.

== Critical reception ==
Professional ratings
Review scores
Source	Rating
AllMusic	4.5/5 stars
Billboard	(favorable)
Christgau's Consumer Guide	(neither)
Entertainment Weekly	B+
Orlando Sentinel	4/4 stars
Rolling Stone	3/5 stars

Scott Schinder of Trouser Press wrote that the Blood Oranges "really blossom" on the Crying Tree, adding that "[Jimmy] Ryan contributes fine, rollicking workouts like "Halfway 'Round the World" and "Titanic," but the real revelation here is the dusky-voiced [Cheri] Knight, whose four songs include the epic "Crying Tree" and the heart-rending ballad "Shadow of You."" In 2013, Darryl Smyers called the album "...an alt-country gem waiting to be rediscovered."

== Track listing ==
1. Halfway 'Round The World
2. Miss It All
3. Hell's Half Acre
4. Bridges
5. Crying Tree
6. Sally
7. Shadow Of You
8. Handle Breaks
9. This Old Town
10. On The Run
11. Titanic
12. Hinges
13. Shine
