= Andrew York =

Andrew York may refer to:

- Andrew York, (born 1930), one of many pseudonyms of British writer Christopher Robin Nicole
- Andrew York (guitarist) (born 1958), American classical guitarist and composer
- Andy York (1894–1977), English footballer

== See also ==
- Andy Yorke, musician
