= Tell It to the Dust =

Studio album by Anders Parker
- Released: 2004
- Studio: Fireproof Recording, Desolation Row, Brooklyn Recording
- Length: 53:21
- Label: Baryon
- Producer: Anders Parker

Anders Parker chronology
Tell It to the Dust (2004)	The Wounded Astronaut (2005)

Tell it to the Dust is a 2004 studio album by American singer-songwriter and guitarist Anders Parker.

== Background ==
Tell It to the Dust is a twelve-track album. It follows the final album by Varnaline, Songs in a Northern Key, which was released in 2001. According to Pitchfork, it is in the folk and country genres.

It was released on Baryon (BYN-003) in 2004.

The album begins with "Tell It to the Dust" and ends with "Doornail".

== Reception ==
Michele Uhlson of Playback reviewed the album for the magazine's November 2004 issue. She said that all the tracks on the album were infectious and it was a necessary addition to your CD collection.

The review of the album by Stephen M. Deusner of Pitchfork refers to the title track as having the loveliest melody and catchiest chorus. "Tell It to the Dust" and "Doornail" were the albums best songs according to him.

In January 2005, Stephen Siegel of The Tucson Weekly said that Anders Parker had never made a bad album and Tell it to the Dust continued that rarest of streaks.

Acrording to Stephen Seigel's review for The Tucson Weekly (issue July 21, 2005), Tell It to the Dust wasn't a lot different from the albums by Varnaline. He also said that the songs have a quality that render them timeless.

The album was given 3 1/2 stars at AllMusic.

Peter Funk of PopMatters said in his 15 June, 2005 review that Parker had "created a magical set of songs that found themselves on many year-end top ten lists."

In 2012, The Los Angeles Times wrote that Tell It to the Dust and The Wounded Astronaut were "hidden gems with a mix of dusty Americana and jagged Crazy Horse guitars.

== Track listing ==
1. "Tell It to the Dust" – 6:24
2. "Goodbye Friend" – 4:00
3. "So It Goes" – 3:16
4. "Something New" – 3:59
5. "Innocents" – 4:02
6. "Don't Worry Honey, Everything's Gonna Be Alright" – 4:19
7. "Into the Sun" – 3:45
8. "Go Alone" – 3:35
9. "Come On Now" – 4:07
10. "Keep Me Hanging On" – 3:48
11. "Feel the Same" – 4:25
12. "Doornail (Hats Off to Buster Keaton)" – 7:41
