= Gob Iron =

American musical group

Gob Iron is an American musical group officially formed in 2006. It consists of Uncle Tupelo/Son Volt's Jay Farrar and Varnaline's Anders Parker. Their debut album, Death Songs for the Living was released on October 31, 2006 by Transmit Sound/Legacy Recordings. Their name comes from a British slang term for a harmonica.

== Music ==
The songs that would become Death Songs for the Living were recorded spontaneously during a five-day period in autumn of 2004 in Farrar's studio in St. Louis. Farrar had originally intended to record a new Son Volt album, but that project was postponed in favor of these songs.

The songs played, with one exception of a Farrar original, were reworked versions of traditional folk songs by artists such as Rev. J. M. Gates, Stephen Foster and the Stanley Brothers. Lyrics and melodies have been altered, some almost entirely rewritten through what is sometimes referred to as the "folk process". While Farrar and Parker chose the songs on the fly, it was later found that death was a common theme running through; hence the title, Death Songs for the Living. The songs are punctuated by nine short instrumentals, one between every pair of songs.

Allmusic praised Death Songs for the Living as Farrar's best effort since Son Volt's 1995 Trace. The album is described as "strong, deeply felt, and speaks of a genuine commitment to keeping the folk tradition alive through a willingness to challenge its structures".

== Discography ==
Discography	Release date	Label
Death Songs for the Living	October 31, 2006	Transmit Sound / Legacy Recordings
