= Cheri Knight =

American singer, songwriter, and bassist

- Genres: Alternative country Rock music
- Occupation: Singer-songwriter
- Instrument(s): Vocals, bass
- Years active: 1990s-present
- Labels: East Side Digital; E-Squared

Cheri Knight is an American singer, songwriter, and bassist known for her albums (solo and with the band Blood Oranges).

== Early music career ==
After performing in various Northampton-area bands, Cheri Knight was the singer, songwriter and bass player with the alternative country band Blood Oranges.

== Solo music career ==
When East Side Digital Records folded, Blood Oranges amicably disbanded. Cheri then recorded two solo albums during her active music career.

The Knitter (1996) was produced by Eric "Roscoe" Ambel, and released on East Side Digital Records. Artists involved included guitarist Eric Ambel (The Del-Lords), bassist Ray Mason, drummer Will Rigby (The dB's), guitarist Mark Spencer, Andy York (bass).

The Northeast Kingdom (1998) was produced by the Twangtrust (Steve Earle and Ray Kennedy) and released on E-Squared Records. Musicians include Steve Earle, Emmylou Harris (vocals), Tammy Rogers (fiddle), Jimmy Ryan (mandolin), Mark Spencer (guitar), and Will Rigby (drums).

== Post-music career ==
There has always been a strong link between gardening and Cheri's music. When not performing music, Cheri tended an organic farm in Massachusetts.

Since the release of The Northeast Kingdom, Cheri has focused on flower farming, and has rarely recorded or performed.

== Discography ==
=== Albums ===
- 1996: The Knitter (East Side Digital)
- 1998: The Northeast Kingdom (E-Squared)
- 2022: American Rituals (Freedom To Spend)

=== Compilations ===
1996: Various Artists – Rig Rock Deluxe (A Musical Salute to the American Truck Driver) (Upstart Sounds) – track 9, "Wagon Of Clay"

- 1999: Various Artists – It's Heartbreak That Sells: A Tribute To Ray Mason (Targa Records), track 4, "Down In The Night"

=== Appears on ===
- 1996: Kevin Salem – Glimmer (Roadrunner Records) – background vocals on track 6, "Sleep" and track 8, "All On Trial"
- 1998: Ray Mason – Old Souls Day (Wormco Records) – background vocals
- 1996: Ray Mason – Missyouville (Ocean Records) – background vocals
- 1996: Wooden Leg – Wooden Leg (East Side Digital Records)

=== With Blood Oranges ===
See Blood Oranges discography
