= Notes of Blue =

Studio album by Son Volt
- Released: February 17, 2017
- Recorded: Red Pill, St. Louis, MO
- Genre: Blues
- Length: 30:49
- Label: Transmit Sound

Son Volt chronology
Honky Tonk (2013)	Notes of Blue (2017)	Union (2019)

Professional ratings
Aggregate scores
Source	Rating
Metacritic	77/100
Review scores
Source	Rating
AllMusic	3/5 stars
American Songwriter	4/5 stars
Blurt	3/5 stars
Classic Rock	3.5/5 stars
Exclaim	7/10 stars
The Independent	4/5 stars
Record Collector	4/5 stars
Slant Magazine	3.5/5 stars
Uncut	8/10 stars

Notes of Blue is the eighth studio album by the American band Son Volt, released on February 17, 2017.

== Track listing ==
All tracks are written by Jay Farrar.

No.	Title	Length
1.	"Promise the World"	3:22
2.	"Back Against the Wall"	3:28
3.	"Static"	2:31
4.	"Cherokee St"	3:00
5.	"The Storm"	2:40
6.	"Lost Souls"	2:19
7.	"Midnight"	3:09
8.	"Sinking Down"	3:32
9.	"Cairo and Southern"	4:43
10.	"Threads and Steel"	2:05

== Personnel ==
- Jay Farrar - vocals, acoustic guitar, electric guitar, organ
- Jacob Edwards - drums, percussion
- Mark Spencer - backing vocals, bass, piano, Weissenborn
- Gary Hunt - backing vocals, fiddle
- Jason Kardong - pedal steel guitar
