= Man of Sin (album) =

Studio album by Varnaline
- Released: 1996
- Length: 35:12
- Label: Zero Hour; Rykodisc
- Producer: Varnaline

Varnaline chronology
| Man of Sin (1996) | Varnaline (1997) |

Man of Sin is the debut album by the American band Varnaline, released in 1996. Varnaline supported the album by touring with the 1996 Lollapalooza festival.

== Production ==
The album constituted frontman Anders Parker's 4-track demos, which he recorded mostly by himself in Portland, Oregon; he formed the band afterwards. Acoustic guitar is the main instrument, although Bob MacKay, a bass player, contributed to four songs. Parker wrote all the songs, which were originally intended for a different musical project. "Little Pills" was inspired by Parker's brother's work in a group home.

== Critical reception ==
Professional ratings
Review scores
| Source | Rating |
|---|---|
| AllMusic | 4/5 stars |
| The Encyclopedia of Popular Music | 3/5 stars |
| Fort Worth Star-Telegram | 3.5/4 stars |
| MusicHound Rock: The Essential Album Guide | 3.5/5 stars |
| NME | 7/10 |

Entertainment Weekly wrote that, "like Eddie Vedder, Varnaline songwriter Anders Parker seems to idolize Neil Young for his twangy introspection; unlike Pearl Jam, he doesn’t weigh down his melancholy with exhibitionistic melodrama." The Chicago Tribune called the album "mostly acoustic, lo-fi tunes occasionally etched with striking, plaintive melodies." The Los Angeles Times opined that the songs oscillate "between very inward folk-pop salted with noisy guitars, and good, muscular, country-tinged expressions of wistfulness, a la Wilco and Son Volt."

NME appreciated that the album "never descends into laboured folk catharsis." The Chicago Reader determined that, "amid the album's relatively lo-fi hiss, layers of guitar—both clean and distorted—and cheap chord-organ tones, Parker's earnest vocals consistently cut through, exuding a genuine ache typically lacking in such at-home affairs." The Record deemed it "a raw, unpretentious project," writing that "Parker's voice is not strong, and is at times tough on the ears as it cracks and strains, but he wrests a great deal of emotion and feeling from it."

AllMusic wrote: "Kind of like a lo-fi indie version of Bruce Springsteen's Nebraska, Man of Sin is a compelling but occasionally harsh album of real staying power."

== Track listing ==
| No. | Title | Length |
|---|---|---|
| 1. | "The Hammer Goes Down" |
| 2. | "Gary's Paranoia" |
| 3. | "Lbs" |
| 4. | "Thorns & Such" |
| 5. | "Little Pills" |
| 6. | "Dust" |
| 7. | "No Decision No Disciple" |
| 8. | "Want You" |
| 9. | "Green Again" |
| 10. | "In the Year of Dope" |
