= Honky Tonk (album) =

Studio album by Son Volt
- Released: March 5, 2013
- Recorded: St. Louis, MO
- Genres: Americana, alternative country
- Length: 36:28
- Label: Rounder

Son Volt chronology
American Central Dust (2009)	Honky Tonk (2013)	Notes of Blue (2017)

Professional ratings
Aggregate scores
Source	Rating
AnyDecentMusic?	7.0/10
Metacritic	76/100
Review scores
Source	Rating
AllMusic	4/5 stars
Consequence of Sound	C−
Exclaim!	5/10 stars
Paste	6.5/10 stars
Pitchfork	5.9/10
PopMatters	7/10 stars
Rolling Stone	4.5/5 stars

Honky Tonk is the seventh studio album by the band Son Volt. It was released March 5, 2013.

== Track listing ==
All tracks are written by Jay Farrar.

No.	Title	Length
1.	"Hearts and Minds"	3:48
2.	"Brick Walls"	2:12
3.	"Wild Side"	3:00
4.	"Down the Highway"	4:00
5.	"Bakersfield"	2:10
6.	"Livin' On"	3:37
7.	"Tears of Change"	2:55
8.	"Angel of the Blues"	4:06
9.	"Seawall"	3:23
10.	"Barricades"	3:42
11.	"Shine On"	3:38

== Personnel ==
- Jay Farrar - vocals, acoustic guitar, harmonica
- Thayne Bradford - accordion
- Mark Spencer - bass, pedal steel guitar, electric guitar
- Dave Bryson - drums, percussion
- Justin Branum - fiddle
- Gary Hunt - fiddle, mandolin, electric guitar
- Brad Sarno - pedal steel guitar
- Mark Spencer - recorded by
