= Corn River =

Studio album by Blood Oranges
- Released: 1990
- Genre: Rock, bluegrass, country
- Label: East Side Digital
- Producer: Paul Q. Kolderie

Blood Oranges chronology
Corn River (1990)	Lone Green Valley (1992)

Corn River is the debut album by the American band Blood Oranges, released in 1990. The album is a mixture of country/bluesgrass covers and originals penned by Jim Ryan and Cheri Knight, who also share the vocal duties. The band supported the album with a North American tour. Their arrangement of "High on a Mountaintop" served as the basis for Marty Stuart's version.

== Critical reception ==
Professional ratings
Review scores
Source	Rating
AllMusic	4.5/5 stars
Alternative Rock	5/10
MusicHound Rock: The Essential Album Guide	3/5 stars

The Boston Globe said that Corn River "is a stunner—glowing with male/ female harmonies reminiscent of Gram Parsons/Emmylou Harris duets, along with some country rock and overdrive mandolin that make this a crossover marvel." The Rocket noted that it "covers a lot of ground, without inconsistencies or misbegotten attempts at clever diversity." The St. Louis Post-Dispatch called the band "the only effective rock/bluegrass fusion band around." The Winston-Salem Journal labeled the music "a delightful, almost surreal hybrid of hillbilly hoedowns, Anglo-style folk and the sort of rural rock 'n' roll identified with the Band."

== Track listing ==
No.	Title	Writer(s)	Length
1.	"Pounding Pipes"		2:45
2.	"Heart of Mud"		2:46
3.	"Baby Down"		2:34
4.	"Shady Grove"	Traditional, Arr. by Blood Oranges	2:50
5.	"Little Maggie"		2:46
6.	"Thief"		3:51
7.	"High on a Mountaintop"		3:39
8.	"Racehorse"		2:42
9.	"Dig a Hole"		2:30
10.	"Houseboat"		3:21
11.	"Incinerator"		2:51
12.	"Western Man"		3:26
13.	"Time Takes Away"		4:16
