= The Northeast Kingdom =

Studio album by Cheri Knight
- Released: 1998
- Studios: Room & Board
- Label: E-Squared
- Producer: The Twangtrust

Cheri Knight chronology
The Knitter (1996)	The Northeast Kingdom (1998)

The Northeast Kingdom is an album by the American musician Cheri Knight, released in 1998. It was Knight's second solo album. Knight supported the album with a North American tour.

== Production ==
The album was produced by the Twangtrust, a duo of Steve Earle and Ray Kennedy; Earle also played guitar. The album was recorded in two weeks at Room & Board Studio, in Nashville, although for months Knight avoided listening to the completed project. Tammy Rogers, Emmylou Harris, Will Rigby, and Garry Tallent were among the musicians who contributed to The Northeast Kingdom. Knight conceived of many of the songs while working on her Massachusetts farm.

== Critical reception ==
Professional ratings
Review scores
Source	Rating
AllMusic	4.5/5 stars
MusicHound Rock: The Essential Album Guide	4/5 stars
Orlando Sentinel	5/5 stars
Spin	8/10

The Chicago Reader wrote that "Knight still sings in an unaffected warble that would make Linda Thompson proud, but this time the able production duo ... masterfully guide that voice on a long, colorful ramble." No Depression thought that the album "arguably defines the moniker 'alternative country' and at the same time stomps on it, defying any genre tag anyone might throw out there."

Jon Pareles, of The New York Times, listed The Northeast Kingdom as one of 1998's best "underheard" albums, writing that "country meets its Celtic heritage in death-haunted songs of love and strife." Spin stated that Knight "heads right into a rich weave of rootsy introspection without stopping to wonder what's country." The Washington Post determined that "a strong undercurrent of reverberating guitars, harmonies and rhythms pushes a lot of the music far beyond the Nashville mainstream."

AllMusic called the album "extremely ambitious, smart mainstream pop with a lot of indie rock and country elements."

== Track listing ==
No.	Title	Length
1.	"Dar Glasgow"
2.	"Rose in the Vine"
3.	"If Wishes Were Horses"
4.	"Northeast Kingdom"
5.	"Black-Eyed Susie"
6.	"Crawling"
7.	"The Hatfield Side"
8.	"White Lies"
9.	"Dead Man's Curve"
10.	"All Blue"
11.	"Sweetheart"
12.	"Black-Eyed Susie Reprise"
