= American Central Dust =

Studio album by Son Volt
- Released: July 7, 2009
- Studios: St. Louis, MO; Tape Kitchen, Brooklyn, NY
- Genres: Americana, alternative country
- Length: 44:04
- Label: Rounder

Son Volt chronology
The Search (2005)	American Central Dust (2009)	Honky Tonk (2013)

American Central Dust is the sixth studio album by the band Son Volt. It was released July 7, 2009 through Rounder Records.

== Reception ==
Professional ratings
Aggregate scores
Source	Rating
AnyDecentMusic?	6.6/10
Metacritic	63/100
Review scores
Source	Rating
AllMusic	4/5 stars
The A.V. Club	B+
Chicago Tribune	3/4 stars
Entertainment Weekly	B−
Los Angeles Times	1.5/4 stars
Pitchfork	3.7/10
PopMatters	5/10 stars
Slant Magazine	2.5/5 stars
Spin	7/10
Uncut	3/5 stars

The album has a score of 63 out of 100 from Metacritic, indicating "generally favorable reviews".

Mojo gave the album four stars out of five and said, "There's a back-to-basics feel on the mid-tempo country rockers, the slow beauties and mournful lap steel, and even on the musically warm, more upbeat, almost Tex-Mex opening song."

The Boston Globe gave the album a favorable review and said, "As usual, singer and songwriter Jay Farrar has a few things on his mind, and his lyrics have grown more plain-spoken and potent with time."

The Phoenix gave it three stars out of four and said, "There's an easiness and directness to these tunes that was missing the last couple of times out, aided by Joe Henry and Ryan Freeland's no-nonsense mix but owing mainly to Farrar's vivid songwriting."

Filter gave the album 72% (though the magazine mislabeled it as "Central American Dust") and said it "settles for regrettably generic high-plains fiddle and wistful sighs of pedel-steel guitar. [...] Fortunately, the lyrics are eminently quotable."

The New York Times gave it a positive review and said it was "all a clear throwback, but the starkly countrified vibe underscores the plaintive cast of Mr. Farrar’s lyrics."

Paste gave it 6.1 out of ten and said that while the album "falls short of 'Trace's' heights, the album showcases Farrar's excellent songwriting, which is comfortingly familiar. It’s also a little monotonous."

Other scores are average, mixed or negative:

The Austin Chronicle gave the album three stars out of five and called it "seldom uplifting" and that it "still reaffirms Son Volt's pinnacle atop today's American roots rockers."

Billboard gave it a score of 56 out of 100 and said that the band "may be playing it too safe on American Central Dust, but the songs are still woven together with a feeling of comfort and familiarity."

Under the Radar gave it five stars out of ten and said, "'Dust And (sic) Daylight' showcases Mark Spencer's beautiful pedal steel, while 'Dynamite,' with its doleful accordion, recalls early Springsteen."

Alternative Press gave the album two stars out of five and said that listening to it "ultimately feels a bit too much like working on an assembly line."

Now also gave it two stars out of five and said of Farrar, "The 12 songs verge on inert, and singing is beginning to sound like a painful act for him. His lyrics, however, are inspired."

Los Angeles Times gave it one-and-a-half stars out of four and said, "The album's sound is raw, but "raw," even in the Americana circles that Son Volt travels in, doesn't always equate with primal power. Sometimes it's just undercooked."

== Track listing ==
All tracks by Jay Farrar

1. "Dynamite" – 2:49
2. "Down to the Wire" – 4:19
3. "Roll On" – 3:10
4. "Cocaine and Ashes" – 4:31
5. "Dust of Daylight" – 3:07
6. "When the Wheels Don't Move" – 3:21
7. "No Turning Back" – 3:35
8. "Pushed Too Far" – 4:25
9. "Exiles" – 4:22
10. "Sultana" – 3:48
11. "Strength and Doubt" – 3:35
12. "Jukebox of Steel" – 2:56

== Personnel ==
- Jay Farrar – acoustic guitar, piano, vocals, lap steel guitar
- Chris Masterson – acoustic guitar, electric guitar, lap steel guitar, backing vocals
- Mark Spencer – acoustic guitar, lap steel guitar, pedal steel, keyboards, backing vocals
- Andrew DuPlantis – bass guitar, backing vocals
- Dave Bryson – percussion, drums

=== Additional musicians ===
- Eleanor Whitmore – violin, viola
