= Okemah and the Melody of Riot =

Studio album by Son Volt
- Released: October 5, 2005
- Recorded: October 12–26, 2004
- Studio: St. Louis
- Genre: Alternative country
- Length: 46:20
- Label: Transmit Sounds
- Producer: Jay Farrar

Son Volt chronology
Wide Swing Tremolo (1998)	Okemah and the Melody of Riot (2005)	The Search (2007)

Okemah and the Melody of Riot is the fourth album by alt-country band Son Volt. It was released on October 5, 2005.

== Reception ==
Professional ratings
Aggregate scores
Source	Rating
Metacritic	72/100
Review scores
Source	Rating
AllMusic	4.5/5 stars
Entertainment Weekly	B
Los Angeles Times	2.5/4 stars
NME	7/10
Pitchfork	6.8/10
PopMatters	7/10 stars
Rolling Stone	3/5 stars
Slant Magazine	4.5/5 stars
Stylus Magazine	B−
Uncut	3/5 stars

The album has a score of 72 out of 100 from Metacritic, indicating "generally favorable reviews". Trouser Press gave the album a very favorable review and called it "A stunning return to form." The A.V. Club gave it a favorable review and said of Jay Farrar, "Even when his overintellectualized lyrics smear into a palette of industrial gray, the guitars provide a strong human heartbeat." NME gave it a score of seven out of ten and said that "Farrar has the passion to carry the songs beyond any hackneyed themes." Other reviews are average or mixed: Mojo gave the album three stars out of five and said, "By focusing on the temporal, [Farrar] reduces himself to simple protest music rather than timeless folk." The New York Times gave it an average review and said, "The band's underlying, stubborn seriousness, and nearly Amish unwillingness to change, creates its appeal." Blender, however, gave it two stars out of five and said that Farrar had "never tried so actively to fuse prescriptive politics into [the] mix, and the move feels suspect."

== Track listing ==
All songs written by Jay Farrar.

1. "Bandages & Scars" – 3:23
2. "Afterglow 61" – 2:48
3. "Jet Pilot" – 3:12
4. "Atmosphere" – 3:50
5. "Ipecac" – 3:29
6. "Who" – 4:02
7. "Endless War" – 4:25
8. "Medication" – 5:00
9. "6 String Belief" – 3:16
10. "Gramophone" – 3:09
11. "Chaos Streams" – 3:52
12. "World Waits for You" – 4:08
13. "World Waits for You (Reprise)" – 1:56

== 2018 Deluxe Edition ==
1. "Exurbia"
2. "Joe Citizen Blues"
3. "Anacostia"
4. "Afterglow 61" (Live)
5. "Gramophone" (Live)
6. "Ipecac" (Live)
7. "Bandages & Scars" (Live)
8. "Atmosphere" (Live)
9. "Medication" (Live)

== Personnel ==
- Jay Farrar - vocals, guitar, piano, harmonica
- Dave Bryson - drums
- Andrew DuPlantis - bass, backing vocals
- Brad Rice - guitar
- Eric Heywood - pedal steel guitar on "World Waits for You"
- John Horton - electric slide guitar on "World Waits for You (Reprise)"
- Mark Spencer - slide guitar and slide dulcimer on "Medication"; backing vocal on "Who"; organ on "Gramophone"
