= Stone, Steel & Bright Lights =

Live album by Jay Farrar
- Released: June 8, 2004
- Recorded: September–October 2003
- Genre: Alternative country
- Length: 73:45
- Label: Transmit Sound, Artemis Records

Stone, Steel & Bright Lights is a live album by Jay Farrar, backed by Canyon. It was recorded in September and October 2003, and released in 2004 on Farrar's label Transmit Sound, and distributed by Artemis Records. An accompanying DVD Live at Slim's was recorded at Slim's on January 23, 2004.

Professional ratings
Review scores
Source	Rating
AllMusic	4/5 stars
Pitchfork	(6.5/10)

== Track listing ==
All tracks written by Jay Farrar, except where noted.

No.	Title	Length
1.	"Doesn't Have to Be This Way"	3:33
2.	"Greenwich Time"	2:30
3.	"6 String Belief"	2:41
4.	"Feel Free"	3:02
5.	"Make It Alright"	4:01
6.	"No Rolling Back"	3:09
7.	"Damn Shame"	2:37
8.	"All of Your Might"	3:34
9.	"Cahokian"	5:00
10.	"Heart on the Ground"	4:44
11.	"California"	4:46
12.	"Fool King's Crown"	2:42
13.	"Vitamins"	4:35
14.	"Voodoo Candle"	3:50
15.	"Damaged Son"	3:19
16.	"Feed Kill Chain"	3:34
17.	"Clear Day Thunder"	3:28
18.	"Lucifer Sam" (Syd Barrett)	5:36
19.	"Like a Hurricane" (Neil Young)	7:07
Total length:		73:45

=== Live at Slim's DVD ===
No.	Title	Length
1.	"Greenwich Time"
2.	"6 String Belief"
3.	"California"
4.	"Feel Free"
5.	"Make it Alright"
6.	"Damn Shame"
7.	"Vitamins"
8.	"Hanging on to You"
9.	"Clear Day Thunder"
10.	"Lucifer Sam" (Syd Barrett)
11.	"Like a Hurricane" (Neil Young)

== Personnel ==
- Jay Farrar – guitars, harmonica, lead vocals
- Evan Berodt – bass
- Dave Bryson – drums, percussion
- Brandon Butler – guitars, lap steel guitar, maracas
- Derrick DeBorja – keyboards
- Joe Winkle – guitars
