= Sebastopol (album) =

Studio album by Jay Farrar
- Released: 2001
- Recorded: Jajouka Studio
- Genre: Alternative country
- Length: 50:25
- Label: Artemis Records
- Producer: Jay Farrar, John Agnello

Professional ratings
Review scores
Source	Rating
AllMusic	4/5 stars
Pitchfork	(7.7/10)

Sebastopol is the first solo studio album by Jay Farrar. It was released in 2001 on Artemis Records.

== Track listing ==
All tracks are written by Jay Farrar

No.	Title	Length
1.	"Feel Free"	3:14
2.	"Clear Day Thunder"	2:43
3.	"Voodoo Candle"	3:53
4.	"Barstow"	3:55
5.	"Damn Shame"	2:36
6.	"Damaged Son"	3:25
7.	"Prelude (Make It Alright)"	1:36
8.	"Dead Promises"	2:12
9.	"Feed Kill Chain"	3:20
10.	"Make It Alright"	5:03
11.	"Fortissimo Wah"	0:38
12.	"Drain"	3:36
13.	"Different Eyes"	3:12
14.	"Outside the Door"	3:56
15.	"Equilibrium"	0:49
16.	"Direction"	2:20
17.	"Vitamins"	4:05

== Personnel ==
- Jay Farrar – guitars, lead vocals, piano, Roland keyboard, tambura
- Jon Wurster – drums, percussion
- Tom Ray – bass
- Matt Pence – drums, percussion
- Steve Drodze – piano, Roland & Ensoniq keyboards, melodica, backing vocals
- Gillian Welch – vocals (4)
- David Rawlings – acoustic guitar, lap steel guitar (4)
- Dade Farrar – bowed stand-up bass (6)
- John Agnello – electric guitar, percussion (7)
- Lou Winer – saxophone (16)
- Kelly Joe Phelps – slide guitar (14)
