= Straightaways =

1997 studio album by Son Volt

Studio album by Son Volt
- Released: April 22, 1997
- Recorded: Echo Park, Bloomington, Indiana and Pachyderm Studios, Cannon Falls, Minnesota
- Genre: Alternative country
- Length: 40:21
- Label: Warner Bros.
- Producer: Brian Paulson, Son Volt

Son Volt chronology
| Trace (1995) | Straightaways (1997) | Wide Swing Tremolo (1998) |

Professional ratings
Review scores
| Source | Rating |
|---|---|
| AllMusic | 3/5 stars |
| Chicago Tribune | 3/4 stars |
| Christgau's Consumer Guide | (dud) |
| Entertainment Weekly | C |
| NME | 6/10 |
| Orlando Sentinel | 5/5 stars |
| Pitchfork | 5.5/10 |
| Rolling Stone | 3.5/5 stars |
| Spin | 3/10 |
| Wall of Sound | 85/100 |

Straightaways is the second release of the band Son Volt. It was released on April 22, 1997.

== Track listing ==
All songs written by Jay Farrar except where indicated.

1. "Caryatid Easy" - 4:43
2. "Back into Your World" - 3:43
3. "Picking Up the Signal" - 3:45
4. "Left a Slide" - 5:10
5. "Creosote" - 4:10
6. "Cemetery Savior" - 3:12
7. "Last Minute Shakedown" - 4:03
8. "Been Set Free" (Jay Farrar, Monica Farrar) - 4:33
9. "No More Parades" - 3:19
10. "Way Down Watson" - 3:42

== Personnel ==
- Jay Farrar - guitars, lead vocals, organ, harmonica
- Dave Boquist - guitars, fiddle, banjo, lap steel guitar
- Eric Heywood - pedal steel guitar, mandolin
- Jim Boquist - bass, backing vocals
- Mike Heidorn - drums
- Pauli Ryan - tambourine
