= The Search (Son Volt album) =

Studio album by Son Volt
- Released: March 6, 2007
- Studios: St. Louis, Missouri
- Genres: Rock, alternative country
- Length: 48:30
- Labels: Transmit Sound, Legacy Recordings

Son Volt chronology
Okemah and the Melody of Riot (2005)	The Search (2007)	American Central Dust (2009)

The Search is the fifth studio album by the band Son Volt. It was released March 6, 2007.

== Reception ==
Professional ratings
Aggregate scores
Source	Rating
Metacritic	65/100
Review scores
Source	Rating
AllMusic	4/5 stars
Alternative Press	2.5/5 stars
The A.V. Club	C
The Music Box	4.5/5 stars
Now	3/5 stars
Paste	6/10
The Phoenix	2.5/4 stars
PopMatters	6/10 stars
Spin	6/10
Uncut	4/5 stars

The album has a score of 65 out of 100 from Metacritic, indicating "generally favorable reviews". Billboard gave the album a very favorable review and called it "Son Volt 2.0, a modern, mature album that might be the group's best yet." The Boston Globe gave it a positive review and called it "A collection of highly listenable roots-rock tunes that stray little from its longtime formula." The New York Times also gave it a positive review and said, "Simple but effective sonic details — a chirpy horn arrangement, a reverse-looped guitar part — prevent “The Search” from feeling either preachy or repetitive." Other reviews are pretty average, mixed, or negative: Q gave it three stars out of five and said it "revisits the social commentary of Farrar's old band." Alternative Press, however, gave it two-and-a-half stars out of five and said that the album "lacks the spark of the band's classic catalog material." Blender gave it one-and-a-half stars out of five and stated: "The saggy country-rock complaints about corporatization and alienation [Farrar] offers... sound like submissions to an Air America poetry contest."

== Track listing ==
1. "Slow Hearse" – 2:32
2. "The Picture" – 3:27
3. "Action" – 2:48
4. "Underground Dream" – 4:32
5. "Circadian Rhythm" – 5:02
6. "Beacon Soul" – 2:31
7. "The Search" – 2:59
8. "Adrenaline and Heresy" – 5:05
9. "Satellite" – 2:14
10. "Automatic Society" – 2:26
11. "Methamphetamine" – 4:02
12. "L Train" – 2:58
13. "Highways and Cigarettes" – 3:54
14. "Phosphate Skin" – 3:52

In addition to the regular compact disc release, a vinyl version and an iTunes version of the album were also released featuring all 22 tracks from the recording sessions. The vinyl version features exclusive cover art and is titled "On Chant and Strum".

=== Vinyl and iTunes editions ===
1. "The Search"
2. "Carnival Blues"
3. "Methamphetamine"
4. "Bleed the Line"
5. "L Train"
6. "Phosphate Skin"
7. "The Picture"
8. "Beacon Soul"
9. "Underground Dream"
10. "Exurbia"
11. "Adrenaline and Heresy"
12. "Action"
13. "Circadian Rhythm"
14. "Bicycle Hotel"
15. "Houdini Punches"
16. "Acetone Angels"
17. "Satellite"
18. "Automatic Society"
19. "Waking World"
20. "Highways and Cigarettes"
21. "Coltrane Free"
22. "Slow Hearse"

== Personnel ==
- Jay Farrar - vocals, guitar, piano, electric bouzouki
- Dave Bryson - drums, percussion
- Derry deBorja - piano, organ, keyboards
- Andrew DuPlantis - bass, backing vocal
- Brad Rice - electric guitars, baritone guitar, electric sitar, EBow
- Chris Deusinger - saxophone on “The Picture” and "Acetone Angels"
- Keith Moyer - trumpet on “The Picture” and "Acetone Angels"
- Eric Heywood - pedal steel on “Methamphetamine” and “Highways and Cigarettes”
- Shannon McNally - acoustic Nashville guitar on “Methamphetamine” and backing vocal on “Highways and Cigarettes"
