= Anders Parker =

American singer-songwriter

- Origin: United States
- Occupation: Musician
- Labels: Munich; Baryon; Bladen County; Rounder; Skycap; Recorded & Freed; Sunset Club

Anders Keith Parker is an American singer-songwriter, guitar player, singer and multi-instrumentalist with a career spanning two decades. He has performed and recorded as a solo artist and as a key member in bands such as Varnaline and Space Needle. Parker has been involved in various collaborations over the years including Gob Iron with Jay Farrar.

== Biography ==
Anders Parker is a first-generation Swedish American. He was born circa 1970 and grew up in Upstate New York, in the Hudson Valley, in a musical family. His father lived in Vermont. In the 1990s Anders moved briefly to Portland, Oregon. He spent some time in North Carolina where he lived with Matt Brown, founder of Bladen County Records, and worked in a bar. He then moved back up north with his one-eyed dog Oly. In 1996 he performed at the NXNE Festival in Toronto, and later he performed and recorded with the band Varnaline.

Parker lived for some time in New York City. In 2008 he moved to Burlington, Vermont, where he lived with his wife as of 2014. In 2016 he had been living in the town of Alert, Nunavut in the Canadian Arctic – the northernmost permanently inhabited place in the world, located 508 miles from the North Pole.

== Career ==
In 2004, Parker released his Tell It to the Dust album on the Baryon label.

Parker's mini-album / EP The Wounded Astronaut was released in March 2005.

In 2006 / 2007, Anders Parker's self-titled album was released on Baryon BYN-006.

== Discography ==
=== Anders Parker ===
- There's a Blue Bird in My Heart (2014)
- New Multitudes (with Jay Farrar, Will Johnson, and Yim Yames) (2012)
- Cross Latitudes (2010)
- Skyscraper Crow (double CD) (2009)
- 14th & Division (live) (2007)
- Anders Parker (2006)
- The Wounded Astronaut (EP) (2005)
- Tell It to the Dust (2004)

=== Gob Iron (with Jay Farrar) ===
- Death Songs for the Living (2006)

=== Varnaline ===
- Songs in a Northern Key (2001)
- Sweet Life (1998)
- A Shot and a Beer (EP) (1997)
- Varnaline (1997)
- Man of Sin (1996)

=== Space Needle ===
- The Moray Eels Eat the Space Needle (1997)
- Recordings 1994–1997 (compilation) (2006)
