= Wide Swing Tremolo =

Studio album by Son Volt
- Released: October 6, 1998
- Recorded: Jajouka Studio
- Genre: Alternative country
- Length: 45:34
- Label: Warner Bros.
- Producer: Son Volt

Son Volt chronology
Straightaways (1997)	Wide Swing Tremolo (1998)	Okemah and the Melody of Riot (2005)

Professional ratings
Review scores
Source	Rating
AllMusic	3.5/5 stars
The Encyclopedia of Popular Music	3/5 stars
Entertainment Weekly	B+
Los Angeles Times	3.5/4 stars
MusicHound Rock: The Essential Album Guide	3.5/5 stars
Pitchfork	7.3/10
Rolling Stone	3.5/5 stars
The New Rolling Stone Album Guide	3/5 stars
Wall of Sound	82/100

Wide Swing Tremolo is the third studio album by alternative country band Son Volt. It was released in 1998 on Warner Bros. Records.

The album peaked at No. 93 on the Billboard 200.

== Production ==
The album was recorded in Millstadt, Illinois, at the band's rehearsal space. It was produced by the band and engineered by David Barbe.

== Critical reception ==
Entertainment Weekly wrote that "many of the songs ... return to the power and purity of the band’s brilliant 1995 debut, Trace. Trouser Press called the album "genuinely mediocre," writing that "the flourishes that had initially made Son Volt uncanny had transgressed into stale formula." The Tucson Weekly wrote that "the songs retain Farrar's downcast approach, but they're extremely well-written this time around; and the band seems to have been reinvigorated, putting a little more into their performances than the cultivated ennui we've become accustomed to."

== Track listing ==
All songs written by Jay Farrar.

1. "Straightface" - 3:02
2. "Driving the View" - 2:57
3. "Jodel" - 0:41
4. "Medicine Hat" - 4:12
5. "Strands" - 5:06
6. "Flow" - 2:18
7. "Dead Man's Clothes" - 2:46
8. "Right on Through" - 3:08
9. "Chanty" - 1:27
10. "Carry You Down" - 3:28
11. "Question" - 4:00
12. "Streets That Time Walks" - 5:24
13. "Hanging Blue Side" - 3:41
14. "Blind Hope" - 3:17

== Personnel ==
- Jay Farrar - guitars, lead vocals, Chamberlin organ, acoustic and electric pianos, dulcimer, harmonica
- Dave Boquist - guitars, lap steel guitar, fiddle, viola
- Jim Boquist - bass, backing vocals, slide guitar (4), piano (7)
- Mike Heidorn - drums, percussion
- Eric Heywood - pedal steel guitar (13, 14)
- David Barbe - Kenyan rattle (13)
