= Andy York =

English footballer

Personal information
- Date of birth: 14 June 1894
- Place of birth: Blyth, England
- Date of death: 1977 (aged 83)
- Place of death: Northumberland, England
- Height: 5 ft 10 1/2 in (1.79 m)
- Position: Left back

Senior career*
Years	Team	Apps	(Gls)
–	Sleekburn Albion		
–	Bedlington United		
–	Blyth Spartans		
1921	Sunderland	1	(0)
–	Coventry City	16	(0)
–	Northampton Town	24	(0)
1927–1930	Lincoln City	106	(6)
–	Newark Town		
–	Scarborough		
- * Club domestic league appearances and goals

Andrew York (Note: His surname is spelt "York" in birth and death records, as well as the Lincoln City FC Archive and the English National Football Archive, but Joyce's Football League Players' Records and the Sunderland-related source The Stat Cat both misspell it Yorke.) (14 June 1894 – 1977) was an English professional footballer who made 147 appearances in the Football League playing for Sunderland, Coventry City, Northampton Town and Lincoln City. He played as a left back.

York was born in Blyth, Northumberland. He began his career in local football in his native north-east of England before signing for Sunderland, for whom he played just once in the First Division before moving south to play for Coventry City in the Second Division and for Third Division clubs Northampton Town and Lincoln City. Already well into his thirties when he signed for Lincoln, he found himself playing regular first-team football for the first time in his career – he missed only four matches in his first two seasons – and helped them reach runners-up spot in 1927–28. He made 114 appearances in all competitions for Lincoln before finishing his career in non-league football with Newark Town and Scarborough. He died in 1977.
