= Live in Seattle (Jay Farrar album) =

Live album by Jay Farrar
- Released: 2004
- Recorded: July 24, 2003
- Venue: The Showbox
- Label: Transmit Sound

Live in Seattle is a live recording by Jay Farrar, along with Eric Heywood and Mark Spencer. The album was recorded at The Showbox in Seattle on 24 July 2003 and released by Transmit Sound Records in 2004.

== Track listing ==
1. Make It Alright
2. Feel Free
3. California
4. Barstow
5. Gather
6. Heart on the Ground
7. No Rolling Back
8. Damn Shame
9. All of Your Might
10. Cahokian
11. Vitamins
12. Feed Kill Chain
13. Voodoo Candle
14. Fool King's Crown
15. White Freightliner Blues (Townes Van Zandt)

All songs written by Farrar except where noted.
