= Son Volt =

American rock band formed in 1994

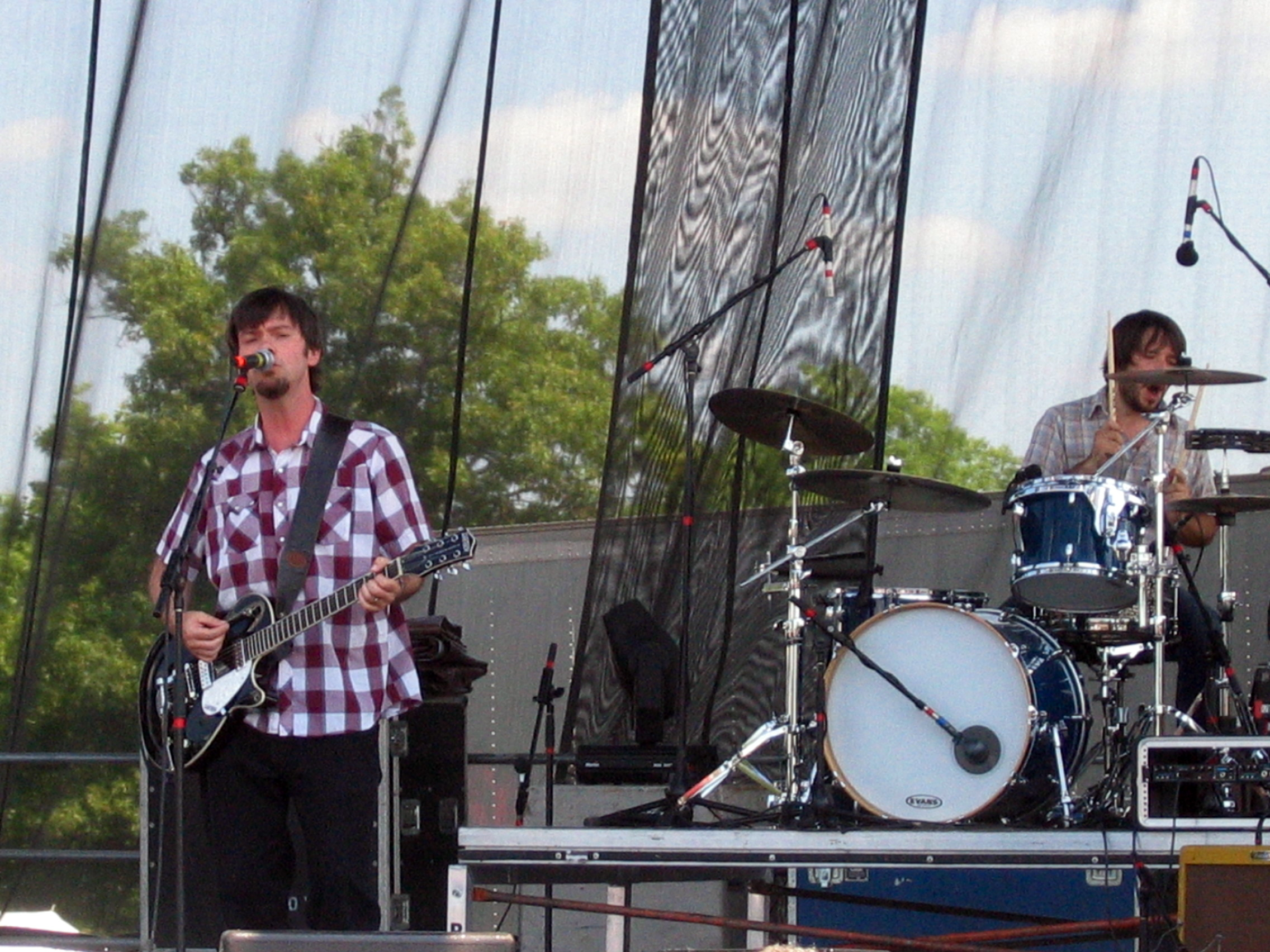
- Son Volt playing at Wakarusa in 2005

Background information
- Origin: Belleville, Illinois, U.S.
- Genres: Alternative rock; alternative country; folk rock; Americana
- Years active: 1994–2001; 2004–present
- Labels: Warner Bros.; Legacy; Rounder; Transmit Sound
- Spinoff of: Uncle Tupelo
- Members: Jay Farrar; Andrew DuPlantis; Mark Patterson; John Horton; Mark Spencer
- Past members: Mike Heidorn; Dave Boquist; Jim Boquist; Eric Heywood; Brad Rice; Derry deBorja; Chris Masterson; Dave Bryson; Gary Hunt; Chris Frame; Jacob Edwards
- Website: sonvolt.net

Son Volt is an American rock band formed in 1994 by Jay Farrar after the breakup of Uncle Tupelo. The band's current line-up consists of Farrar (vocals, guitar), Andrew DuPlantis (bass guitar), John Horton (guitar), Mark Patterson (drums), and Mark Spencer (keyboard, steel guitar). In addition to playing alternative rock, the band is considered a staple of the alternative country rock movement of the 1990s. The band's sound also is rooted in folk rock and Americana. The band went on an indefinite hiatus in 2001, before reforming in 2004.

== History ==
=== Early years, Trace, Straightaways, and Wide Swing Tremolo ===
The group formed after the alternative country rock act Uncle Tupelo broke up due to tensions between Farrar and bandmate Jeff Tweedy. After Uncle Tupelo split, Tweedy formed the alternative rock act Wilco, while Farrar decided to form another act. While forming Son Volt, Farrar met Jim and Dave Boquist during the final Uncle Tupelo tour and teamed up with former Uncle Tupelo drummer Mike Heidorn to create the band. The group performed and recorded in the Minneapolis area in late 1994 and performed its first concert at the 7th Street Entry in Minneapolis on June 16, 1995. While half of the band was rooted in the Minneapolis area, Farrar and Heidorn lived in the St. Louis area, and the band used both cities as bases for its operations during the first couple of years.

Son Volt's first album, Trace, met with critical acclaim and topped many "best-of" lists in 1995. It was a moderate commercial success; the first track "Windfall" became very popular in the alt-country scene, while the band released "Drown" as a single which charted No. 10 on the mainstream rock charts and No. 25 on the modern rock charts. By 2009, Trace had sold 297,000 copies in the United States.

1997's Straightaways followed in the same vein as Trace with even a more acoustic feel, leading some music critics to give negative reviews, but strong and positive reviews came from outlets such as the Orlando Sentinel and the Chicago Tribune. 1998's Wide Swing Tremolo featured a heavier rock sound and received mostly positive reviews from music outlets. Entertainment Weekly wrote that "many of the songs ... return to the power and purity of the band’s brilliant 1995 debut, Trace."

=== Hiatus and return ===
Farrar announced a hiatus from Son Volt after their 1999 tour. Beginning in 2001, Jay Farrar released several solo efforts that postponed further releases from Son Volt. Farrar reformed with the original members of Son Volt to record a song for a tribute album for Alejandro Escovedo. The sessions reportedly went so well that Farrar and the other band members intended to record once again in the autumn of 2004. Just prior to the sessions, however, Farrar and the other band members abruptly ended negotiations. Farrar formed a new version of the band with a different line-up and released an album on Transmit Sound/Sony Legacy, Okemah and the Melody of Riot, a folk-rock album based on protest music that had been influenced by Woody Guthrie and Bob Dylan. in 2005. That same year also saw the release of A Retrospective: 1995-2000, which gathered highlights from this era, along with previously unreleased recordings. 2006 saw the release of a live DVD, Six String Belief, which was recorded at The Orange Peel in Asheville, NC.

=== Band reformed and new music ===
In 2007, the band returned to an alternative rock and alt-country sound and released a studio album called The Search. The Americana- and folk-influenced album American Central Dust followed, released by Rounder Records on July 7, 2009. Their next project was a Bakersfield Sound-influenced album aptly named Honky Tonk, which was released March 5, 2013, also by Rounder Records. A large scale tour followed the release of the album. On February 17, 2017, the band released Notes of Blue on Farrar's label, Transmit Sound.

=== Union and Electro Melodier ===
The band's ninth studio album, Union, was released on March 28, 2019 on Farrar's Transmit Sound label and distributed by Thirty Tigers Records. The album consisted of songs that were highly critical of the election of US President Donald Trump and his administration. Many of the songs were commentaries on middle-class economics, freedom of the press, and immigration. Son Volt's tenth album, Electro Melodier, was released on July 30, 2021. In early summer 2021, guitarist Chris Frame announced that he would be leaving the band to pursue other interests and was replaced by former The Bottle Rockets guitarist John Horton. The tribute album Day of the Doug followed in 2023.

== Musical style ==
Son Volt's music ranges from quiet folk ballads reminiscent of The Freewheelin' Bob Dylan, to heartland rock in the spirit of Neil Young with Crazy Horse. The band's sound features a heavy alternative rock sound in many places, all while basing their music in mostly an Americana style. Reviews refer to the band as alternative country pioneers, a "staple in the alt-country scene" or "a cult favorite", with their music "spanning a few musical niches", but based in Americana.

== Members ==
Current

- Jay Farrar (guitar, harmonica, piano, vocals), formerly of Uncle Tupelo
- Mark Patterson (drums)
- John Horton (guitar), formerly of the Bottle Rockets
- Mark Spencer (keyboards, steel guitar, bass), formerly of Blood Oranges
- Andrew DuPlantis (bass guitar)

Former

- Mike Heidorn (drums), formerly of Uncle Tupelo (original member of Son Volt)
- Dave Boquist (banjo, fiddle, guitar, lap steel) (original member of Son Volt)
- Jim Boquist (bass guitar, backing vocals) (original member of Son Volt)
- Eric Heywood (mandolin, pedal steel)
- Brad Rice (guitar on Okemah and the Melody of Riot, The Search)
- Derry deBorja (keyboards on The Search)
- Chris Masterson (guitar on American Central Dust)
- Gary Hunt (guitar, mandolin, steel guitar on Honky Tonk)
- Dave Bryson (drums on Okemah and the Melody of Riot, The Search, American Central Dust, Honky Tonk)
- Jason Kardong (pedal steel on Notes of Blue)
- Jacob Edwards (drums on Notes of Blue)
- Chris Frame (guitar on Union, Electro Melodier)

== Discography ==
=== Albums ===
List of studio albums, with selected chart positions and sales figures
Title	Album details	Peak chart positions				Sales
Title	Album details	US	US Heat.	US Ind.	US Alt.	Sales
Trace	Released: September 19, 1995; Label: Warner Bros.	166	7	—	—	US: 297,000
Straightaways	Released: April 22, 1997; Label: Warner Bros.	44	—	—	—	US: 95,000
Wide Swing Tremolo	Released: October 6, 1998; Label: Warner Bros.	93	—	—	—	
Okemah and the Melody of Riot	Released: October 5, 2005; Label: Transmit Sound	89	—	—	—	
The Search	Released: March 6, 2007; Label: Transmit Sound	81	—	6	—	
American Central Dust	Released: July 7, 2009; Label: Rounder	44	—	—	12	US: 21,000
Honky Tonk	Released: March 5, 2013; Label: Rounder	67	—	—	16	
Notes of Blue	Released: February 17, 2017; Label: Transmit Sound	91	—	4	10	
Union	Released: March 29, 2019; Label: Transmit Sound	—	—	6	—	
Electro Melodier	Released: July 30, 2021; Label: Transmit Sound	—	—	—	—	
Day of the Doug	Released: June 16, 2023; Label: Transmit Sound	—	—	—	—	
Sound Signal Serenades	Released: August 28, 2026; Label: Transmit Sound	—	—	—	—	

=== Live albums ===
- Live at the Orange Peel (2020), Transmit Sound

=== Compilations ===
- A Retrospective: 1995-2000 (2005), Warner Bros. Records/Rhino

=== Soundtracks ===
- "Looking at the World Through a Windshield" on Feeling Minnesota soundtrack

=== Singles ===
List of singles, with selected chart positions and certifications, showing year released and album name
Title	Year	Peak chart positions					Album
Title	Year	US AAA	US Heritage	US Main.	US Mod.	CAN Alt.	Album
"Windfall"	1995	—	—	—	—	—	Trace
"Drown"	1995	15	—	10	25	—	Trace
"Loose String"	1995	—	—	—	—	—	Trace
"Route"	1996	—	—	—	—	—	Trace
"Back Into Your World"	1997	—	—	—	—	—	Straightaways
"Picking Up the Signal"	1997	—	—	—	—	—	Straightaways
"Caryatid Easy"	1997	—	—	—	—	—	Straightaways
"Driving the View"	1998	—	—	—	—	—	Wide Swing Tremolo
"Straightface"	1998	—	28	—	—	8	Wide Swing Tremolo
"Joe Citizen Blues/Jet Pilot"	2005	—	—	—	—	—	Okemah and the Melody of Riot
"The Picture"	2007	30	—	—	—	—	The Search
"Down to the Wire"	2009	—	—	—	—	—	American Central Dust
"Hearts and Minds"	2013	—	—	—	—	—	Honky Tonk
"Back Against the Wall"	2017	24	—	—	—	—	Notes of Blue
"The 99"	2019	—	—	—	—	—	Union
"The Reason"	2019	—	—	—	—	—	Union
"The Globe"	2020	—	—	—	—	—	Electro Melodier
"Reverie"	2021	—	—	—	—	—	Electro Melodier
"Livin' in the USA"	2021	—	—	—	—	—	Electro Melodier
"—" denotes releases that did not chart or were not released in that territory.

=== Music videos ===
Year	Video	Director
1995	"Drown"	Phil Harder
