= Trace (Son Volt album) =

Studio album by Son Volt
- Released: September 19, 1995
- Recorded: November–December 1994
- Studios: Salmagundi, Northfield, MN
- Genre: Alternative country
- Length: 42:07
- Label: Warner Bros.
- Producers: Brian Paulson; Son Volt

Son Volt chronology
Trace (1995)	Straightaways (1997)

Singles from Trace
- 1. "Windfall" Released: September 4, 1995; 2. "Drown" Released: October 31, 1995; 3. "Loose String" Released: December 1995; 4. "Route" Released: June 1996

Trace is the debut studio album by American rock band Son Volt, released on September 19, 1995, through Warner Bros. Records. The band was formed the previous year by Jay Farrar after the breakup of the influential alt-country band Uncle Tupelo. Prior to its release, there was debate about whether Son Volt or Wilco, Uncle Tupelo's other offshoot, would produce a better album.

Trace was a critical and commercial success, and peaked at number 166 on the Billboard 200 chart and number 7 on the Billboard Heatseekers Albums chart. The album's second single, "Drown", was a radio hit, and charted at number 10 on the Billboard Mainstream Rock Tracks chart and number 25 on the Billboard Modern Rock Tracks chart (and was their only single to make either chart). By 2009, Trace had sold 297,000 copies in the United States, and outsold Wilco's A.M., released six months before, two-to-one.

== Reception ==
Professional ratings
Review scores
Source	Rating
AllMusic	5/5 stars
Entertainment Weekly	A
Houston Chronicle	4/5 stars
Mojo	4/5 stars
NME	8/10
Paste	9.5/10
PopMatters	9/10
The Rolling Stone Album Guide	4/5 stars
Uncut	9/10
The Village Voice	C+

Trace received critical acclaim. According to AllMusic, "Throughout Son Volt's debut, Trace, the group reworks classic honky tonk and rock & roll, adding a desperate, determined edge to their performances. Even when they rock out, there is a palpable sense of melancholy to Farrar's voice, which lends a poignancy to the music." AmericanaUK calls Trace, "A graceful masterpiece, a positive turning of the page for Farrar, and a gentle reminder of the power and long-lasting influence of Uncle Tupelo."

The Village Voice placed Trace at number 13 on the 1995 Pazz & Jop critics poll, whilst the album placed ninth on Rolling Stone's 1995 critics' list. In 2016, Paste ranked Trace fourth on its list of "The 50 Best Alt-Country Albums of All Time".

== Track listing ==
All songs written by Farrar except "Mystifies Me", written by Ronnie Wood.

1. "Windfall" – 2:58
2. "Live Free" – 3:13
3. "Tear Stained Eye" – 4:21
4. "Route" – 3:57
5. "Ten Second News" – 3:57
6. "Drown" – 3:20
7. "Loose String" – 3:48
8. "Out of the Picture" – 3:50
9. "Catching On" – 4:02
10. "Too Early" – 4:29
11. "Mystifies Me" – 4:12

== Personnel ==
- Dave Boquist - guitar, banjo, fiddle, lap steel guitar, dobro
- Jim Boquist - bass, backing vocals
- Jay Farrar - vocals, guitar
- Mike Heidorn - drums
- Eric Heywood - pedal steel guitar
- Craig Krampf - drums on "Live Free"
- Dan Newton - accordion on "Too Early"
- Marc Perlman - bass on "Mystifies Me"

== Charts ==
Chart (1995–1996)	Peak position
US Billboard 200	166
US Heatseekers Albums (Billboard)	7
