= Blood Oranges (band) =

American alternative country band

- Blood Oranges, 1991

Background information
- Genres: alternative country
- Years active: 1988–95, 2002
- Members: Jim Ryan; Mark Spencer; Cheri Knight; Ron Ward
- Past members: Bob Kendall; Liz Wood; Andy Churchill; Keith Levreault

Blood Oranges were an American alternative country band that formed in the late 1980s.

The founding members were Jim Ryan (acoustic and electric mandolin, guitar, and vocals), Bob Kendall (bass guitar) then replaced by Liz Wood (later Liz Crawley) (bass guitar, vocals), Andy Churchill (guitar) later replaced by Mark Spencer, and Ron Ward (drums). Cheri Knight took over on bass guitar in 1990 after Crawley moved to Wisconsin. Between 1990 and 1994 they released two full albums (Corn River, The Crying Tree) and one EP (Lone Green Valley). Trouser Press described them as "one of America's finest and least formulaic roots-rock combos." The group disbanded in 1994.

In 1995, Mark Spencer left the band to tour with Lisa Loeb. Jim Ryan and Cheri Knight have gone on to other musical projects, and the band reunited to record the song "Gathering Flowers for the Master's Bouquet" for the 2003 soundtrack of the movie The Slaughter Rule.

== Discography ==
=== Albums ===
- 1990: Corn River (East Side Digital Records)
- 1994: The Crying Tree (East Side Digital Records)

=== EPs ===
- 1992: Lone Green Valley (East Side Digital Records)

=== Appears on ===
- 2002: Various Artists - (Soundtrack From The Film) The Slaughter Rule (Bloodshot Records) - track 8, "Gathering Flowers For The Master's Bouquet"
