= Jay Farrar =

American singer-songwriter

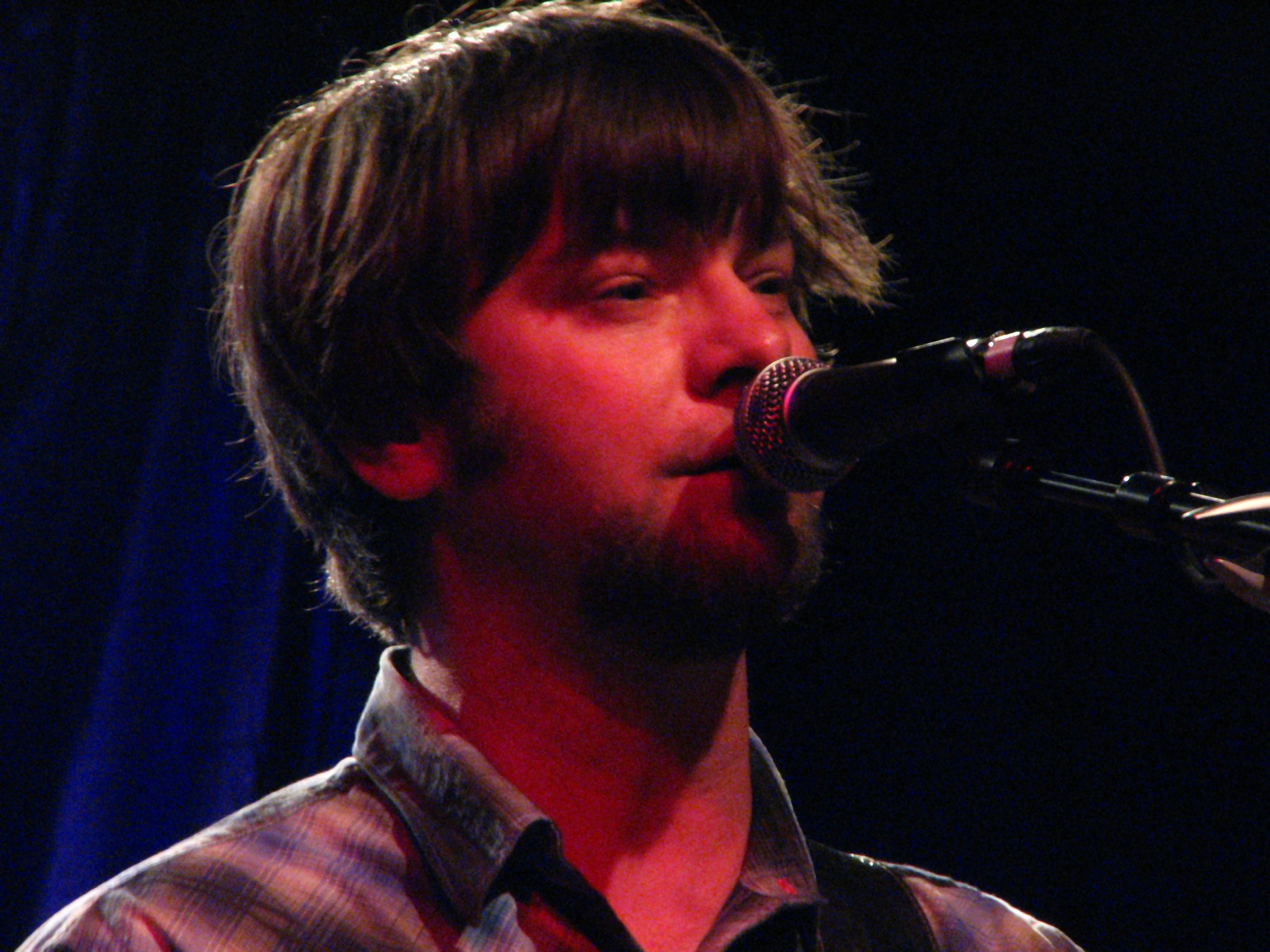
- Farrar performing at the El Rey Theatre in April 2007

Background information
- Also known as: Cane Skretteburg
- Born: Jay Stuart Farrar; December 26, 1966 (age 59); Belleville, Illinois, U.S.
- Genres: Alternative rock; alternative country; blues rock
- Instruments: Vocals; guitar; harmonica
- Years active: 1984–present
- Labels: Giant/Rockville; Sire; Warner Bros.; Artemis; Act/Resist; Legacy
- Website: jayfarrar.net

Jay Stuart Farrar (born December 26, 1966) is an American songwriter and musician based in St. Louis. A member of two critically acclaimed music groups, Uncle Tupelo and Son Volt, he began his solo music career in 2001. Beyond being a songwriter, Farrar plays guitar, piano, harmonica, and sings.

== Uncle Tupelo ==
Farrar formed Uncle Tupelo with Jeff Tweedy and Mike Heidorn in 1987 after the lead singer of their previous band, The Primitives, left to attend college. The trio recorded three albums for Rockville Records, before signing with Sire Records and expanding to being a five-piece. Shortly after the release of the band's major label debut album Anodyne, Farrar announced his decision to leave the band owing to a soured relationship with his co-songwriter Tweedy. Uncle Tupelo is often mentioned as one of the originators of the alt-country genre of music or subgenre of country music which combines country, folk, and/or bluegrass with punk rock, alt-rock, indie rock, or other genres.

== Son Volt ==
After the dissolution of Uncle Tupelo in 1994, Farrar formed the rock group Son Volt, whose original lineup released three albums in the late 1990s, before undergoing a hiatus in 1999. In 1999, Farrar was invited to participate in the tribute album for Moby Grape co-founder Skip Spence, who was terminally ill with cancer. The album, More Oar: A Tribute to the Skip Spence Album (Birdman, 1999), was an album of cover versions of the songs on Spence's only solo album, Oar (Columbia, 1999). In 2005, the band re-formed with a different lineup and has released seven additional albums.

== Other ==
In 1995, Farrar collaborated with Kelly Willis on the song "Rex's Blues", which appeared on Red Hot + Bothered, an AIDS benefit album produced by the Red Hot Organization. As a solo artist, he has released two full-length albums, two EPs, one film score, and various live recordings. His full-length albums are Sebastopol (2001) and Terroir Blues (2003), the first released on the independent record label Artemis Records and the second released on his own label, Transmit Sound.

An EP of songs from the Sebastopol sessions, entitled ThirdShiftGrottoSlack was released in 2002. His score for the independent film The Slaughter Rule (2002, directors Alex and Andrew Smith) was released in 2003 on the independent record label Bloodshot Records. Farrar formed his own independent record label in 2003, Transmit Sound (formerly called "Act/Resist Records"). In 2004, Farrar released a six-song live acoustic EP entitled Live EP. Also 2004 marked the release of the live CD/DVD Stone, Steel & Bright Lights.

Farrar worked closely with keyboardist Steven Drozd of The Flaming Lips during the recording of Sebastopol. Eric Heywood, Mark Spencer from the Blood Oranges, and the rock group Canyon have often accompanied Farrar in his solo recordings and performances. Spencer is now a full-time member of Son Volt. In 2006, Farrar announced the formation of a new band, Gob Iron, with Varnaline's Anders Parker. The songs which would make up their debut album were recorded in autumn 2004, while Farrar was in the process of recording a new Son Volt album. In April 2019, Parker and Farrar released a 7-inch single using the Gob Iron moniker.

Farrar collaborated with Ben Gibbard (of the indie rock band Death Cab for Cutie) to create all of the music for the soundtrack for the 2009 documentary film One Fast Move or I'm Gone, about Jack Kerouac's time spent at Big Sur. The soundtrack was released on October 20, 2009. In 2012, Farrar along with Will Johnson, Yim Yames, and Anders Parker collaborated on the Woody Guthrie archive project, New Multitudes.

== Style ==
His musical style ranges from sparse, unaccompanied folk music to full rock and roll band arrangements comparable to Neil Young or Dinosaur Jr. His solo recordings also often include sound experiments, reminiscent of psychedelia, with a distinct Eastern bent. One of the hallmarks of his sound is the use of alternate tunings on the guitar. His love for Woody Guthrie inspired a custom guitar made by Creston Lea of Burlington, Vermont. The guitar was made from artifacts Farrar gathered from the site of Guthrie's childhood home.
