= Invisible Hour =

Studio album by Joe Henry
- Released: June 3, 2014
- Recorded: July 2013
- Studios: The Garfield House (South Pasadena, California); Stampede Origin (Culver City, California)
- Genre: Rock
- Length: 1:00:16
- Label: Work Song
- Producer: Joe Henry

Joe Henry chronology
Reverie (2011)	Invisible Hour (2014)	Shine a Light (2016)

Professional ratings
Aggregate scores
Source	Rating
Metacritic	80/100
Review scores
Source	Rating
AllMusic	4/5 stars
Paste Magazine	9.4/10

Invisible Hour is the thirteenth studio album by American musician Joe Henry. It was released in June 2014 under Work Song Recordings.

== Track listing ==
All songs by Joe Henry except where noted

No.	Title	Writer(s)	Length
1.	"Sparrow"		7:23
2.	"Grave Angels"		5:31
3.	"Sign"		8:57
4.	"Invisible Hour"	Joe Henry, Lisa Hannigan, Colum McCann	4:01
5.	"Swayed"		5:16
6.	"Plainspeak"		5:25
7.	"Lead Me On"		4:30
8.	"Alice"		2:45
9.	"Every Sorrow"	Joe Henry, John Smith	4:58
10.	"Water Between Us"		5:01
11.	"Slide"		6:29

== Personnel ==
- Joe Henry – vocals, acoustic guitars
- Greg Leisz – acoustic guitars, mandola, mandocello, Weissenborn
- John Smith – acoustic guitars, backing vocals, mandola (11)
- Jennifer Condos – electric bass (1–3, 5, 6, 8–11)
- David Piltch – upright bass (4, 7)
- Jay Bellerose – drums, percussion
- Levon Henry – clarinet, bass clarinet, soprano saxophone, tenor saxophone
- The Milk Carton Kids (Kenneth Pattengale, Joey Ryan) – backing vocals
- Lisa Hannigan – vocals (11)

=== Production ===
- Joe Henry – producer, photography
- Ryan Freeland – recording, mixing, mastering
- Julian Cubillos – studio assistance
- Anabel Sinn – design
- Isa Marcelli – back cover photography
- Levon Henry – portrait of Jay Bellerose
