= Dorado (album) =

Studio album by Son of the Velvet Rat
- Released: 17 February 2017
- Studios: Stampede Original, in Culver City, California
- Genres: Indie rock, folk rock
- Length: 44:43
- Labels: Fluff and Gravy, Mint 400 Records
- Producers: Joe Henry, Ryan Freeland

Son of the Velvet Rat chronology
Firedancer (2013)	Dorado (2017)	The Late Show (2018)

Dorado is the eighth studio album from the Austrian rock band Son of the Velvet Rat.

== Content ==
The ten-track album was released with Mint 400 Records on 17 February 2017, and was produced by Joe Henry and Ryan Freeland at Stampede Original in Culver City, California. It is described as a desert-themed concept album. A vinyl edition of Dorado was released by Fluff and Gravy Records, on 31 March 2017. The album features session musicians Jay Bellerose, Adam Levy, David Piltch and Patrick Warren, and the track "Blood Red Shoes" contains backing vocals from Victoria Williams. The song "Blood Red Shoes" was released as a single on 13 January 2017. Dorado draws comparisons to the music of the alternative country band Lambchop, the folk country singer-songwriter Townes Van Zandt, the blues rock singer-songwriter Tom Waits, and the folk rock singer-songwriter Joni Mitchell.

== Reception ==
A positive review in Dagger says "you could call this stuff desert noir and probably get away with it," and compares the vocals on Dorado to Nick Cave and Bob Dylan. The review ends with "the bottom line here is that these folks are excellent songwriters and with the backing band (and their own musical talents) Dorado is the kind of Grade A music that doesn't come along very often so soak it all in when it does. This record is a keeper. Adam McKinney of Weekly Volcano says Dorado "feels like a document of two artists who feed off the arid sun and unforgivingly cold nights of the Mojave Desert. Many of the tracks on Dorado are slow burns, seductively lulling you into a contemplative revery before arriving at genuinely thrilling crescendos[;] you feel as though you've arrived at the heart-rending climax of a great short story. To listen to this album is, yes, to be taken to a darker place, but once it's all said and done[,] I find myself uplifted and energized by the care, integrity, and lived-in worlds these artists have created. The track "Blood Red Shoes" is described as "captur[ing] the sweltering heat and arid wind of the sandy landscape [Son of the Velvet Rat] now call home," and contains an "almost danceable counterpoint to the somber nature of the lyrics."

A comprehensive review by Eleni Austin in Coachella Valley Weekly says "there is a novelistic approach to Georg's songwriting that recalls the cinematic language employed by authors like John Fante, Nathanael West and James M. Cain." She calls "Surfer Joe" and "Sweet Angela" the two stand-out tracks on Dorado, and closes her review with "from the cobblestones of Vienna to the arid sonic landscapes of Mojave Desert, [Son of the Velvet Rat]'s music seems to soak up their surroundings. Dorado is truly the first great album of 2017."

== Track listing ==
No.	Title	Length
1.	"Carry On"	3:53
2.	"Copper Hill"	4:53
3.	"Blood Red Shoes"	5:08
4.	"Love's the Devils Foe"	4:14
5.	"Shadow Dance"	3:56
6.	"Surfer Joe"	4:05
7.	"Starlite Motel"	3:40
8.	"Sweet Angela"	6:41
9.	"Tiger Honey"	3:21
10.	"Franklin Avenue"	4:52
Total length:		44:43

== Personnel ==
- Georg Altziebler – vocals and guitar
- Heike Binder – accordion and backing vocals

=== Additional musicians ===
- Jay Bellerose – drums
- Miriam Bichler – backing vocals
- Faith Chinnock – backing vocals
- Kelly Corbin – clarinet and saxophone
- Bob Furgo – violin
- Scott Kisinger – trombone
- Adam Levy – guitar
- David Piltch – bass
- Gar Robertson – guitar
- Patrick Warren – keys
- Victoria Williams – backing vocals on "Blood Red Shoes"
