= The Gospel According to Water =

Studio album by Joe Henry
- Released: November 15, 2019
- Recorded: June 10–11 & 28, 2019
- Studio: Groundlift Research & Development (Los Angeles, California); Sleeper Cave Records (Northampton, Massachusetts)
- Length: 53:47
- Label: EarMusic
- Producer: Joe Henry

Joe Henry chronology
Thrum (2017)	The Gospel According to Water (2019)	All the Eye Can See (2022)

Professional ratings
Aggregate scores
Source	Rating
Metacritic	85/100
Review scores
Source	Rating
AllMusic	4/5 stars
Under the Radar	8.5/10

The Gospel According to Water is the fifteenth studio album by American musician and producer Joe Henry. It was released in November 15, 2019 under EarMusic Records.

== Critical reception ==
The Gospel According to Water was met with universal acclaim reviews from critics. At Metacritic, which assigns a weighted average rating out of 100 to reviews from mainstream publications, this release received an average score of 85, based on 6 reviews

In a year-end essay for Slate, Ann Powers cited The Gospel According to Water as one of her favorite albums from 2019 and proof that the format is not dead but rather undergoing a "metamorphosis". She added that concept albums had reemerged through the culturally-relevant autobiographical narratives of artists such as Henry, who, "faced with a daunting cancer diagnosis ... wrote a whole new hymnal, in the form of a song journal written at 4 a.m."

== Track listing ==
All songs written by Joe Henry

The Gospel According to Water track listing
No.	Title	Length
1.	"Famine Walk"	4:58
2.	"The Gospel According to Water"	6:10
3.	"Mule"	3:43
4.	"Orson Welles"	5:43
5.	"Green of the Afternoon"	4:17
6.	"In Time for Tomorrow"	3:41
7.	"The Fact of Love"	4:30
8.	"Book of Common Prayer"	3:30
9.	"Bloom"	3:38
10.	"Gates of Prayer Cemetery, No. 2"	2:50
11.	"Salt and Sugar"	4:47
12.	"General Tzu Names the Planets for His Children"	3:12
13.	"Choir Boy"	2:48

== Personnel ==
- Joe Henry – vocals, acoustic guitars, electric guitars
- Patrick Warren – acoustic piano, additional keyboards
- John Smith – acoustic guitars
- David Piltch – electric bass (8)
- Levon Henry – clarinet, tenor saxophone
- JT Nero – vocals (6, 7)
- Allison Russell – vocals (6, 7)

=== Production ===
- Joe Henry – producer
- S. Husky Hoskulds – recording, mixing, mastering
- Andy Cass – additional recording
- Ryan Tanner – design, photography

== Charts ==
Chart performance for The Gospel According to Water
Chart	Peak position
UK Americana Albums (OCC)	17
US Top Rock Albums (Billboard)	17
US Heatseekers Albums (Billboard)	11
US Independent Albums (Billboard)	39

== Release history ==
Region	Date	Label	Format
Worldwide	November 15, 2019	EarMusic	CD, Digital Download
Worldwide	December 6, 2019	EarMusic	Vinyl
