= Find Me a Home =

Single by Natalie Duncan

from the album Devil In Me
- Released: 14 September 2012
- Recorded: 2011
- Genre: Soul; blues
- Length: 4:22 (radio mix)
- Label: Verve
- Songwriters: Natalie Duncan; Jimmy Hogarth
- Producer: Joe Henry

Natalie Duncan singles chronology
"Sky Is Falling" (2012)	"Find Me a Home" (2012)	"Black & White" (2015)

"Find Me a Home" is a song by British singer and songwriter Natalie Duncan, featured on her debut album Devil In Me and also included in the Find Me a Home EP. The single was digitally released on 14 September 2012.

== Music video ==
Screen shot from "Find Me a Home" music video.

A music video for "Find Me a Home" was released on 24 September 2012 on YouTube. Directed by Joe Elliott, the video was filmed in various locations in and around London. The video's storyline follows a man on a search for Natalie Duncan, while scenes depict Natalie driving through the city.

From MOBO: "The track is set for release on October 29th, and the video tells a tense tale of two journeys that seemingly come together. It's a dark thriller set in the rich, pulsing life of London at night, as a sinister figure closes in on Natalie Duncan. As Duncan's rich and fluid voice cracks, it's hard to not be fully taken into her world – she sings of "devils, cracks and dishevelled", and as the track unfolds it's clear she possesses the vocal power to break the hearts of thousands."

== Track listings ==
Digital download

1. "Find Me a Home" – 4:22
2. "Find Me a Home" (radio mix) – 3:29
3. "Sky Is Falling" (Lenzman remix) – 5:25
4. "At Last" (Autotrader version) – 3:00
