= Reverie (Joe Henry album) =

Studio album by Joe Henry
- Released: October 11, 2011
- Recorded: January – March 2011
- Studios: The Garfield House (South Pasadena, California); Orphan (Dublin, Ireland)
- Genres: Rock; Folk; Country; World
- Length: 61:13
- Label: ANTI-
- Producer: Joe Henry

Joe Henry chronology
Blood From Stars (2009)	Reverie (2011)	Invisible Hour (2014)

Reverie is a 2011 album by American singer-songwriter Joe Henry. Mojo placed the album at number 50 on its list of the "Top 50 Albums of 2011".

== Reception ==
Professional ratings
Aggregate scores
Source	Rating
Metacritic	81/100
Review scores
Source	Rating
AllMusic	4.5/5 stars
American Songwriter	4/5 stars
The Independent	3/5 stars
Mojo	4/5 stars
Now	3/5 stars
Paste	7.8/10
The Sydney Morning Herald	4/5 stars
The Telegraph	3/5 stars
Uncut	4/5 stars

Reverie received positive reviews from critics. On Metacritic, the album holds a score of 81/100 based on 8 reviews, indicating "universal acclaim".

== Track listing ==
All tracks by Joe Henry except where noted

1. "Heaven's Escape" - 4:54
2. "Odetta" - 4:33
3. "After the War" - 3:25
4. "Sticks & Stones" - 4:50
5. "Grand Street" - 4:53
6. "Dark Tears" - 5:15
7. "Strung" - 4:30
8. "Tomorrow Is October" - 4:34
9. "Piano Furnace" - 4:27
10. "Deathbed Version" - 3:24
11. "Room at Arles" - 3:28
12. "Eyes Out for You" (Henry, Richard Walters) - 5:16
13. "Unspeakable" - 4:38
14. "The World and All I Know" - 3:06

== Personnel ==
- Joe Henry – vocals, acoustic guitar
- Keefus Ciancia – acoustic piano (1–5, 7–14)
- Patrick Warren – acoustic piano (6), pump organ (14)
- Marc Ribot – acoustic guitar (5, 8, 10), ukulele (5, 8, 10)
- David Piltch – upright bass
- Jay Bellerose – drums
- Jean McLain – backing vocals (2, 4)
- Lisa Hannigan – vocals (9)

Production

- Joe Henry – producer
- Ryan Freeland – recording, mixing, mastering
- Gavin Glass – additional recording
- Stampede Origin (Culver City, California) – mastering location
- Trevor Hernandez – design
- Pablo Motes – photography
- Michael Wilson – photography
