= The Sky Is Falling =

The Sky Is Falling or Sky Is Falling may refer to:

== Literature ==
- The Sky Is Falling, the catch phrase of the fable Henny Penny, also known as Chicken Little and Chicken Licken
- The Sky Is Falling (Sheldon novel), by Sidney Sheldon
- The Sky Is Falling (Del Rey novel), by Lester Del Rey
- The Sky Is Falling (Pearson novel), by Kit Pearson
- The Sky Is Falling: A Maximum Ride Novel, re-titled Fang: A Maximum Ride Novel, the sixth book in the Maximum Ride series by James Patterson
- The Sky Is Falling, a novel, by Caroline Adderson

== Film and television ==
- The Sky Is Falling, a 1947 Terrytoons short with Mighty Mouse
- The Sky Is Falling (1979 film), a 1979 film directed by Silvio Narizzano, starring Dennis Hopper
- The Sky Is Falling (2000 film), a 2000 American independent film, written and directed by Florrie Lurence, starring Dedee Pfeiffer and Teri Garr
- The Sky Is Falling (2000 film), aka Il Cielo cade, an Italian film, directed by Andrea Frazzi & Antonio Frazzi, starring Isabella Rossellini
- "The Sky Is Falling" (Baywatch), a 1989 television episode

== Music ==
- Sky Is Falling, a 2002 album by Grainger
- The Sky Is Falling (album), a 1980 album by Randy Stonehill
- The Sky Is Falling and I Want My Mommy, a 1991 album by Nomeansno with Jello Biafra
- "The Sky Is Falling", a 2007 song on Conviction, by Aiden
- "The Sky Is Falling", a 1997 song on Marigold Sky, by Hall & Oates
- "The Sky Is Falling", a 2007 song on The Tempest, by The Insane Clown Posse
- "Sky Is Falling", a 2002 song on Stanley Climbfall, by Lifehouse
- "Sky Is Falling" (Natalie Duncan song), 2012, on Devil in Me
- "The Sky Is Fallin'", a 2002 song on Songs for the Deaf, by Queens of the Stone Age
- "The Sky Is Falling", a 2007 song on Southern Born Killers, by Stuck Mojo
- "The Sky Is Falling", a 2008 song on The Alchemy Index Vols. III & IV, by Thrice
- "Where I End And You Begin (The Sky is Falling In)", a 2003 song on Hail to the Thief by Radiohead
