= Into the Quiet =

Studio album by Kristy Hanson
- Released: March 30, 2010
- Recorded: at Stampede Origin by Ryan Freeland
- Length: 46:38
- Producer: Tim Young

Kristy Hanson chronology
Already Gone (2007)	Into the Quiet (2010)	"This Christmas" (single) (2010)

Into the Quiet is an album by Kristy Hanson released in 2010.

== Track listing ==
1. "Second Fiddle" (Kristy Hanson) – 3:36
2. "Alone Now" (Hanson) – 3:06
3. "Do It Again" (Hanson) – 3:14
4. "Off the Ground" (Hanson) – 4:20
5. "Wrong Way" (Hanson) – 3:23
6. "Crazy" (Hanson) – 3:39
7. "Crawl" (Hanson) – 4:22
8. "Too Much" (Mike Chiaburu / Hanson) – 3:27
9. "No One" (Hanson) – 4:21
10. "Dig" (Chiaburu / Hanson) – 3:29
11. "Ohio" (Hanson) – 3:33
12. "Into the Quiet" (Hanson) – 6:08

== Personnel ==
- Mike Chiaburu - electric bass
- Ryan Freeland - recording engineer, mixing,
- Kristy Hanson - vocals, acoustic guitar
- Gavin Lurssen - mastering engineer
