= Civilians (Joe Henry album) =

Studio album by Joe Henry
- Released: September 11, 2007
- Studios: The Garfield House, South Pasadena
- Genre: Folk rock
- Length: 57:42
- Label: ANTI-
- Producer: Joe Henry

Joe Henry chronology
| Tiny Voices (2003) | Civilians (2007) | Blood from Stars (2009) |

Civilians is the eleventh studio album by Joe Henry, released on August 18, 2007. It was his first album of new material since his 2003 album Tiny Voices. Henry recorded the album at The Garfield House in South Pasadena, California between January 9–12 and February 22, 2007. The album also includes guest musicians Loudon Wainwright III, Bill Frisell, Greg Leisz, and Van Dyke Parks.

The photograph on the album's cover is by John Cohen and shows visual artist Mary Frank (spouse of Robert Frank), circa 1960. The back cover's photograph features artist Red Grooms crossing Third Avenue in 1960.

== Concept ==
In an interview with Impose Magazine, Henry stated that he wanted the album to be less about the production, and geared more toward the feel of "a band playing in a room." This approach is evident from the more stripped-back and raw feel of the album compared to the polish and sophistication heard on his previous three albums. Civilians is less upbeat and more influenced toward jazz and folk, which have melancholy undertones.

== Reception ==
Professional ratings
Review scores
| Source | Rating |
|---|---|
| AllMusic | 4.5/5 stars |
| Billboard | 4/5 stars |
| Pitchfork Media | 5.9/10 |

The album received generally strong praise across the board, achieving an average score of 77 on Metacritic. Thom Jurek of AllMusic praised the album for its straightforward sound, and that Civilians is "the evidence of what pop music can and should be, profound without being self conscious, elegant while wearing its seams in plain view, and full of speech both lyrically and musically that invites the listener in for a real conversation." Dan Ouellette of Billboard was impressed with the anecdotal qualities of the album, especially on the track "Our Song". Meanwhile, Joshua Klein of Pitchfork Media criticized the album for its sound, describing the tempo as "dour", and expressed some dissatisfaction for the album's social commentary on American life.

== Track listing ==
All songs written by Joe Henry, except where noted.

1. "Civilians" – 4:36
2. "Parker's Mood" – 4:16
3. "Civil War" – 4:42
4. "Time Is a Lion" – 3:55
5. "You Can't Fail Me Now" (Henry, Loudon Wainwright III) – 4:13
6. "Scare Me to Death" – 4:54
7. "Our Song" – 6:20
8. "Wave" – 4:30
9. "Love Is Enough" – 4:49
10. "I Will Write My Book" – 4:12
11. "Shut Me Up" – 6:16
12. "God Only Knows" – 5:03

== Personnel ==
- Joe Henry – vocals, acoustic guitar, handclaps, knee slaps, corduroy
- Patrick Warren – acoustic piano, Chamberlin, pump organ
- Van Dyke Parks – acoustic piano (3, 10)
- Bill Frisell – electric guitars, acoustic guitar
- Greg Leisz – acoustic guitar, lap steel guitar, Weissenborn guitar, mandolin
- David Piltch – double bass, electric bass
- Jay Bellerose – drums, percussion
- Loudon Wainwright III – backing vocals
- Chris Hickey – additional backing vocals (1, 4)

The Section Quartet on "Our Song"

- Patrick Warren – arrangements and conductor
- Richard Dodd – cello
- Leah Katz – viola
- Eric Gorfain – first violin
- Daphne Chen – second violin

Production

- Joe Henry – producer
- Ryan Freeland – recording, mixing
- Gavin Lurssen – mastering at The Mastering Lab (Hollywood, California)
- Anabel Sinn – design
- John Cohen – photography
- Michael Wilson – additional photography
