= Devil in Me (disambiguation) =

Devil in Me is a 2012 album by Natalie Duncan.

Devil in Me or The Devil in Me may also refer to:

- The Devil in Me (Thelma Houston album), by Thelma Houston (1977)
- The Devil in Me (Suzi Quatro album), by Suzi Quatro (2021)
- The Dark Pictures Anthology: The Devil in Me, a video game released in 2022
- "The Devil in Me", a song by Jackson Jackson from the album Tools for Survival (2008)
- "Devil in Me", a song by Alexandra Burke from the album Heartbreak on Hold (2012)
- "Devil in Me", a song by Halsey from the album Hopeless Fountain Kingdom (2017)
- "Devil in Me", a song by Purple Disco Machine from the album Soulmatic (2017)
