= Jennifer Condos =

American bass guitarist

- Genre: Rock
- Occupation: Musician
- Instrument: Bass guitar
- Years active: 1983–present
- Formerly of: Tito & Tarantula

Jennifer Condos is an American bass guitarist known primarily for her session and live performance work. She has contributed to the recordings and live performances of many well-known artists.

== Biography ==
Condos was a founding member of the band Tito & Tarantula and remained with it from 1993–1999. She appeared on their first two albums.

In 1986, Condos was a member of the band that backed Fleetwood Mac vocalist Stevie Nicks when she toured in support of her album Rock a Little.

Condos is a member of the Band of Sweethearts, which includes Brad Meinerding (guitar), Eric Heywood (pedal steel guitar), and Jay Bellerose. They frequently accompany Over the Rhine.

Condos has been a member of Ray LaMontagne's touring band with Jay Bellerose, Eric Heywood, and Greg Leisz.

In 2016, Condos worked with Sam Phillips, Jay Bellerose, and Eric Gorfain to record the score of the Gilmore Girls: A Year in the Life series on Netflix.

== Discography ==
=== As a member of Tito & Tarantula ===
- 1997: Tarantism (Cockroach)
- 1999: Hungry Sally & Other Killer Lullabies (Cockroach)

=== As composer ===
- 1987: Various artists – Back to the Beach (Columbia) – track 3, "Sign of Love" (co-written with Mark Goldenberg)
- 1991: Susanna Hoffs – When You're a Boy (Columbia) – track 11, "Made of Stone" (co-written with Susanna Hoffs and David Kahne)

=== As producer ===
- 2013: Charlie Faye – You Were Fine, You Weren't Even Lonely (Wine And Nut)

=== Also appears on ===
==== 1983–1999 ====
- 1983: Jess Tolan – Jess Tolan (Thoroughbred)
- 1985: Pointer Sisters – Contact (RCA) on track 6, "Bodies And Souls"
- 1986: Graham Grace – Shining Knight (Palace)
- 1986: Jackson Browne – Lives in the Balance (Asylum)
- 1987: Stevie Nicks – Live at Red Rocks DVD (Sony)
- 1988: Karla Bonoff – New World (MusicMasters)
- 1988: Parthenon Huxley – Sunny Nights (Columbia)
- 1990: Tom Borton – Dancing with Tigers (Mesa/Blue Moon)
- 1992: E – A Man Called E (Polydor)
- 1993: Holly Near – Musical Highlights from the Play Fire in the Rain (Calico Tracks)
- 1995: Bruce Springsteen – The Ghost of Tom Joad (Columbia) on track 10, "Across the Border"
- 1996: Amy Sky – Cool Rain (BMG)
- 1996: Eels - Beautiful Freak (Dreamworks - uncredited)
- 1997: Dan Bern – Dan Bern (Work Group)
- 1997: Jann Arden – Happy? (A&M)
- 1999: Be Five – Trying to Forget (Renaissance)
- 1999: Joe Henry – Fuse (Mammoth)
- 1999: various artists – Return of the Grievous Angel: A Tribute to Gram Parsons (Almo) on track 11, "A Song for You"

==== 2000–2005 ====
- 2000: Teddy Thompson – Teddy Thompson (Virgin)
- 2000: Jann Arden – Blood Red Cherry (Universal)
- 2001: Ryan Adams – Gold (Lost Highway)
- 2001: Glen Phillips – Abulum (Brick Red)
- 2001: Whiskeytown – Pneumonia (Lost Highway)
- 2003: Albert Lee – Heartbreak Hill (Sugar Hill)
- 2003: Eastmountainsouth – Eastmountainsouth (DreamWorks)
- 2003: Joe Henry – Tiny Voices (ANTI-)
- 2003: Teitur – Poetry & Aeroplanes (Universal)
- 2004: Mutual Admiration Society – Mutual Admiration Society (Sugar Hill)
- 2004: various artists – Bridget Jones: The Edge of Reason: The Original Soundtrack (Island) on track 18, "Calling"
- 2005: Ryan Adams – 29 (Lost Highway) on track 7, "The Sadness"

==== 2007–2009 ====
- 2006: Dan Bern – Breathe (Messenger)
- 2006: Parthenon Huxley – Mile High Fan (Not Lame)
- 2007: The Naked Brothers Band – The Naked Brothers Band (Columbia)
- 2007: Patrick Park – Everyone's in Everyone (Curb Appeal)
- 2007: various artists – Endless Highway: The Music of The Band (429 Records) on track 9, "Stage Fright"
- 2008: Greg Copeland – Diana and James (Inside)
- 2008: Rachael Yamagata – Elephants...Teeth Sinking into Heart (Warner Bros.) on track 1–02 "What If I Leave"
- 2008: Sam Phillips – Don't Do Anything (Nonesuch)
- 2008: Ray La Montagne – Gossip in the Grain (RCA), drums, vocals
- 2009: Joe Henry – Blood from Stars (ANTI–)
- 2009: Pete Droge and Elaine Summers (as the Droge & Summers Blend) – Volume One (Puzzle Tree)

==== 2010–present ====
- 2010: Rusty Anderson – Born on Earth (Megaforce)
- 2010: Ray LaMontagne – God Willin' & the Creek Don't Rise (RCA / Stone Dwarf / RED)
- 2011: Catie Curtis – Stretch Limousine on Fire (Compass)
- 2011: Jeffrey Foucault – Horse Latitudes (Signature Sounds)
- 2011: Sam Phillips Cameras in the Sky
- 2011: Sam Phillips – Solid State
- 2012: Bettye LaVette – Thankful N' Thoughtful (ANTI–)
- 2013: Over the Rhine – Meet Me at the Edge of the World (Great Speckled Dog)
- 2013: Sam Phillips Push Any Button (Littlebox)
- 2014: Joe Henry – Invisible Hour (Work Song)
- 2015: Bony King – Wild Flowers (Pias)
- 2015: Jackson Browne – Standing in the Breach (Inside)
- 2016: Graham Nash – This Path Tonight (Blue Castle)
- 2017: Tift Merritt – Stitch Of The World (Yep Roc)
- 2019 : Moya Brennan (with Cormac De Barra) – Timeless
