= Crowes Pasture =

American folk music group

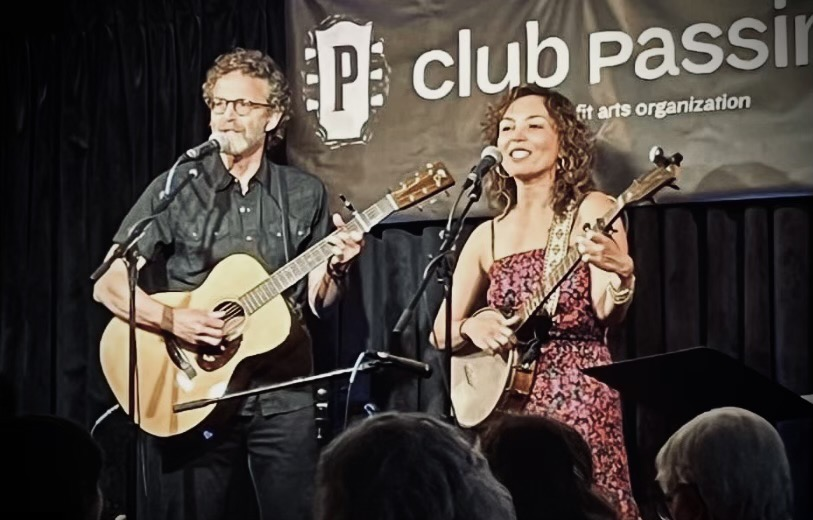
Crowes Pasture

Crowes Pasture is an American folk duo from Boston, Massachusetts, composed of Andy Rogovin (vocals and guitar) and Monique Byrne (vocals and banjo). Crowes Pasture's music is characterized as contemporary/indie folk with an emphasis on close harmony singing, and is heavily influenced by traditional folk, old-time and country music.

Rogovin and Byrne met while working as corporate attorneys and married in 2001. They had musical backgrounds, and first sang together singing lullabies for their children. Their first joint musical effort was in 2011, the founding of a multi-generational folk chorus the Newton Family Singers. They have released 5 albums plus 2 songs from an upcoming album which have earned numerous awards. The duo has achieved thirteen Top 10 songs on Folk Alliance International’s Folk Chart, starting with "edge of America" in 2017 and most recently “Raise Your Hand,” which reached #3 in January 2026. Other include “Take Back the Red White and Blue” (2022); their cover of Mary Gauthier’s “Mercy Now” (2019); and the topical song “Quarantine” (2021).” They have toured the United States, Canada, England and Scotland. Publications have summarized that their body of work has earned them critical acclaim and chart success.

== Overview ==
Crowes Pasture is an American folk duo from Boston, Massachusetts, composed of Andy Rogovin (vocals and guitar) and Monique Byrne (vocals and banjo). Some of their recorded music includes other musicians. The duo has been active as Crowes Pasture since 2015. Crowes Pasture's music is characterized as contemporary/indie folk with an emphasis on close harmony singing, and is heavily influenced by traditional folk, old-time and country music. Their performance tours have been in the US, Canada, England and Scotland. They take their name from the salt marsh and tidal flats known as Crowes Pasture, located on the north side of Cape Cod, and a longtime destination for the duo and their family.

== Origins and evolution ==
=== Andy Rogovin ===
Andy Rogovin was raised in the Boston, MA area and studied philosophy and psychology at Brandeis University. Rogovin has been playing guitar and writing songs since college. He coached high school cross country and track teams and ran a drop-in center for teenagers on Cape Cod for over a decade. He earned a law degree from Northwestern University School of Law and worked as a corporate lawyer from 1995 to 2026.

=== Monique Byrne ===
Monique Byrne was born in Ottawa, Canada to immigrant parents from Peru and raised in Tampa, FL. Her parents are Dr. Luis O. Byrne and Mrs. Charo Byrne.

Byrne has been playing guitar since grade school. As a child she liked music and dancing, and sang in musicals, church, and later in bands." She also studied clawhammer banjo for several years with Canadian old-time banjoist Allison DeGroot. She studied International Relations at the University of Pennsylvania, and earned a law degree from Georgetown University Law Center, and worked as a corporate lawyer from 1996 through 2010.

=== History as a duo ===
Andy Rogovin and Monique Byrne met in 1996 while both working in the Boston-based law Hutchins, Wheeler & Dittmar as corporate attorneys and married in 2001. They have two children, Gabriel and Felix.

Their musical life together started at home playing lullabies for their children.

Their first joint musical effort was in 2011, the founding of a multi-generational folk chorus the Newton Family Singers which has performed over 30 semi-annual folk and popular music choral programs, each featuring approximately 70 singers ages 4 to 80+. They both retain roles in the organization. Rogovin, Byrne and 3 other members of the Newton Family Singers formed the band Waiting for Neil. When Waiting for Neil eventually became inactive Rogovin and Byrne headed out on their own and formed Crowes Pasture.

== Musical influences and approach ==
They have said that their style of intimate duo singing was initially inspired by The Civil Wars (John Paul White and Joy Williams), and that the Milk Carton Kids (Joey Ryan and Kenneth Pattengale). John Prine, Mary Gauthier, Paul Simon, David Byrne, Scott Cook and many lesser-known great songwriters have influenced their songwriting. They stated in an interview that they feel that the best way to reach someone's heart is through storytelling.

== Music and albums ==
=== 2015 Best Believe (EP) ===
Crowes Pasture's debut EP Best Believe was recorded in Nashville with Gary Paczosa and featured Molly Tuttle on banjo and guitar, John Mailander on fiddle and Sam Grisman on bass.

=== 2016 Crowes Pasture ===
Crowes Pasture’s first full-length album Crowes Pasture was recorded and produced by Adam Michael Rothberg at the Mini Studio in Cambridge, MA, and features David Delaney on fiddle, Stroker Rogovin on accordion and keyboard and Adam Michael Rothberg on guitar, mandolin and bass.

=== 2016 Ramblin' Round A Woodie Guthrie Tribute EP ===
Ramblin' Round A Woodie Guthrie Tribute is an EP composed of songs by and about Woodie Guthrie. It was recorded, and produced by Adam Michael Rothberg at the Mini Studio in Cambridge, MA.

=== 2017 Edge of America ===
Crowes Pasture's second full length studio album Edge of America was produced and recorded by Doug Kwartler at Hollow Body Studios in Chelmsford, Massachusetts. The album featured fiddler Patrick M'Gonigle and multi-instrumentalist Doug Kwartler.

"This duo, Monique Byrne and Andy Rogovin, present a combination of original songs and covers that reflect their influences and let them showcase their folk music influences. Acoustic instruments and vocals shine in this earthy reflection of talent."

=== 2019 Slow It Down ===
Crowes Pasture's third studio album Slow It Down was produced and recorded by Doug Kwartler at Hollow Body Studios in Chelmsford, Massachusetts in 2019 and mastered and mixed by Glenn Barratt and Erik Balkey at Morningstar Studio in Philadelphia. The album featured fiddler Bas van der Brugge and multi-instrumentalist Doug Kwartler.

The title track "Slow it Down" was #1 on the Folk Alliance International Folk DJ chart for June 2019.

Their song "High Wire" from their Slow It Down album is a story of New York's Twin Towers across four decades. It begins with Philippe Petit's high-wire walk between the towers in 1974 and concludes with the events of September 11, 2001.

=== 2023 Don't Blink ===
Crowes Pasture's fourth studio album Don't Blink was produced and recorded by Eric Lichter at Dirt Floor Recording and Production in Haddam, Connecticut in 2023. The album featured fiddler Andy Reiner and multi-instrumentalist Eric Lichter. It was released in 2023 and was well received by critics.

Rogovin described the impetus for the album as: "Since the release of our prior album "Slow It Down" in 2019, the world experienced a global pandemic that caused many to re-examine the choices they were making in living every day. Our songwriting and song selections for Don't Blink reflect the preciousness of life and the importance of being a conscious (deliberate) and active chooser of the life you lead."

The song "Barranco" was chosen as the International Acoustic Music Awards best Country/Bluegrass song for 2024. As explained by Monique Byrne: My dad was a doctor who came to the U.S. from Peru in 1963. My mom married him over the phone (with his brother standing in for him at the ceremony) and then followed him to the U.S. Together they raised three girls in Tampa, Florida. My dad had a full medical practice here in the U.S. but also spent summers in Peru, seeing patients and treating them with medications that weren't available in Peru. He was very dedicated to his country, his family and the people of Peru. I wrote this song when my mother was on a plane bringing his ashes back to his hometown, Barranco, a beautiful, artsy town on the ocean." It was released before the album and was well received by critics. "This music is just pretty, and the song is a love song of the deepest kind — the kind of love you feel for place and family. Beautifully done and soaring."

=== Releases from upcoming album ===
The song "Coming For You Next" was #3 on the Folk Alliance International Folk DJ chart for November 2025.

Song "Raise Your Hand" was #3 on the Folk Alliance International Folk DJ chart for January 2026.

== Other awards and charts ==
In 2109 and 2022 Crowes Pasture was nominated for the New England Music Awards Roots Act of the Year. In 2019 and 2022 they were nominated for the New England Music Awards Roots Act of the Year. They were also nominated for the Boston Music Awards 2019 Americana Artist of the Year

"Their CD, "Slow It Down", was released in June 2019 at the Club Passim, after which it debuted at #5 on the Folk Alliance International Charts and the title song achieved #1 on those charts. The duo has achieved thirteen Top 10 songs on Folk Alliance International’s Folk Chart, starting with "edge of America" in 2017 and including “Slow It Down,” which debuted at #1; “Raise Your Hand,” which reached #3 in January 2026; “Take Back the Red White and Blue” (2022); their cover of Mary Gauthier’s “Mercy Now” (2019); and the topical song “Quarantine” (2021).”

They were nominated twice as "Roots Act of the Year" by the New England Music Awards (2019 and 2022) and as "Americana Artist of the Year" by the Boston Music Awards (2019). "They were named finalists for Best Group/Duo in the 2020 International Acoustic Music Awards, and for Best Group/Duo in the 2021 IAMAs, for their song "A Virtue and a Call"."
