= Already Gone =

Already Gone may refer to:

- Already Gone (film), a 2019 American film
- Already Gone (album), by Kristy Hanson
- "Already Gone" (Eagles song), 1974
- "Already Gone" (Powderfinger song), 1998
- "Already Gone" (Melanie C song), 2007
- "Already Gone" (Sugarland song), 2008
- "Already Gone" (Kelly Clarkson song), 2009
- "Already Gone" (Taylor Henderson song), 2014
- "Already Gone", a song by 4Minute from 4Minutes Left
- "Already Gone", a song by Alvvays from Antisocialites
- "Already Gone", a song by Crossfade from Falling Away
- "Already Gone", a song by Disturbed from Evolution
- "Already Gone", a song by The Luchagors from their 2007 same-titled album
- "Already Gone", a song by Puddle of Mudd from Life on Display
- "Already Gone", a song by Stone Temple Pilots from their 2018 same-titled album
