= Fireman's Wedding =

EP by Joe Henry
- Released: February 15, 1994
- Genre: Alternative country
- Length: 19:04
- Label: Mammoth
- Producer: Joe Henry

Joe Henry chronology
Kindness of the World (1993)	Fireman's Wedding (1994)	Trampoline (1996)

Professional ratings
Review scores
Source	Rating
AllMusic	2/5 stars

Fireman's Wedding is an EP by Joe Henry, released in 1994, which followed shortly after the album release of Kindness of the World, the parent release for this EP.

== Track listing ==
1. "Fireman's Wedding" – 4:25
2. "Hello Stranger" (Live) – 2:52
3. "Dark as a Dungeon" (with Billy Bragg) – 4:28
4. "Stranger" – 2:34
5. "Friend to You" (Live) – 4:50

== Notes ==
- Tracks 1 and 5 written by Joe Henry.
- Track 2 written by A.P. Carter.
- Track 3 written by Merle Travis and Elvis Presley.
- Track 4 written by Howard and Barney.
