= Kindness of the World =

Studio album by Joe Henry
- Released: 1993
- Recorded: April 10–24, 1993
- Studio: Kingsway (New Orleans, Louisiana)
- Genre: Alternative country, folk
- Length: 58:00
- Label: Mammoth
- Producer: Joe Henry

Joe Henry chronology
| Short Man's Room (1992) | Kindness of the World (1993) | Fireman's Wedding EP (1994) |

Kindness of the World is an album by the American musician Joe Henry, released in 1993.

In 2006, Henry referred to Kindness of the World as alternative country—although he didn't consider that to be a defined genre when he made the album—and expressed regret over its recording process. Henry supported the album by touring with Jimmie Dale Gilmore.

== Production ==
The album was produced by Henry, with Brian Paulson helping to engineer. He was backed by members of the Jayhawks, as well as by Mike Russell. Kindness of the World was recorded at Daniel Lanois's studio, in New Orleans. "I Flew Over Our House Last Night" is a cover of the Tom T. Hall song. The title track is a duet with Victoria Williams. Henry wrote the originals as they came to him, and tried not to overwork them. The album includes an unlisted track.

== Critical reception ==
Professional ratings
Review scores
| Source | Rating |
|---|---|
| AllMusic | 4.5/5 stars |
| The Encyclopedia of Popular Music | 3/5 stars |
| Entertainment Weekly | A− |
| MusicHound Rock: The Essential Album Guide | 4/5 stars |
| (The New) Rolling Stone Album Guide | 3.5/5 stars |

Entertainment Weekly wrote that Henry's "plain-sung, pedal-steel-pierced vignettes ... plumb America’s psyche with a classicist’s, not a provocateur’s, perspective." Trouser Press thought that "the songs are so fine that such eclecticism doesn’t call attention to itself; Kindness of the World sounds completely organic and thought-out." The New York Times concluded that "Henry is fond of waltzes and ballads; it's easy to imagine Willie Nelson singing 'She Always Goes', and waltzes like 'This Close to You' could be last-call honky-tonk anthems."

Stereo Review noted that "in spare but telling language Henry evokes the romantic fatalism at the heart of the country-music mythos in 'She Always Goes'." The Austin American-Statesman considered the album to be one of 1993's best, writing that, where Henry's songwriting "formerly flirted with the elliptical and oblique, his material has become as elemental and direct on the surface as it is multilayered beneath it." The Atlanta Journal-Constitution determined that the songs "have a lived-in, rustic feel, a sustained understatement that throws the singer's mature narratives and life sketches to the forefront." The News & Observer listed it as the tenth best album of 1993.

Reviewing Henry's Trampoline, Spin deemed Kindness of the World "mellow to a fault." (The New) Rolling Stone Album Guide labeled it Henry's "first consistently compelling collection."

== Track listing ==
All tracks are written by Joe Henry, except where noted.

| No. | Title | Writer(s) | Length |
|---|---|---|---|
| 1. | "One Day When the Weather Is Warm" | | 5:06 |
| 2. | "Fireman's Wedding" | | 4:24 |
| 3. | "She Always Goes" | | 4:21 |
| 4. | "This Close to You" | | 4:24 |
| 5. | "Kindness of the World" | | 4:50 |
| 6. | "Third Reel" | | 5:04 |
| 7. | "Dead to the World" | | 3:36 |
| 8. | "I Flew Over Our House Last Night" | Tom T. Hall | 5:18 |
| 9. | "Some Champions" | | 4:32 |
| 10. | "Buckdancer's Choice" | | 7:11 |
| 11. | "Who Would Know" | | 7:27 |

== Personnel ==
The band

- Joe Henry – vocals, acoustic piano, acoustic guitar, electric guitar
- Phil Kelly – acoustic piano, Hammond B3 organ, pump organ
- Gary Louris – acoustic guitar, electric lead guitar, backing vocals
- Mike Russell – mandolin, tenor banjo, violin, razzbone, backing vocals
- Marc Perlman – bass
- Mark Lafalce – drums, percussion, backing vocals

Special guest musicians

- Bill Dillon – acoustic guitar, dobro, pedal steel guitar, guitorgan
- Victoria Williams – vocals
