= The Late Show (Son of the Velvet Rat album) =

Live album by Son of the Velvet Rat
- Released: 15 June 2018
- Genre: Indie rock, folk rock
- Length: 52:18
- Label: Fluff and Gravy, Mint 400 Records

Son of the Velvet Rat chronology
Dorado (2017)	The Late Show (2018)

The Late Show is the ninth album from the Austrian rock band Son of the Velvet Rat.

== Content ==
The eleven-track album was released on digital download with Mint 400 Records, on 15 June 2018. It is a live album, that was recorded from three shows in Vienna, Austria, Wenden and Burbank, California for their 2017 tour, supporting the album Dorado. It features Altziebler on guitar and Binder on accordion and keys, with additional support from Dominik Krejan on Fender Rhodes and piano, and Muck Willmann and Felix Kruger on drums. The Late Show contains five songs from Dorado, and six songs from previous albums. It showcases sparse performances, and is compared to the music of the rock singer-songwriter Bruce Springsteen, and the blues rock singer-songwriter Tom Waits. The compact disc and vinyl editions of The Late Show were released by Fluff and Gravy Records, on 13 July 2018.

== Reception ==
A review by Eleni Austin in Coachella Valley Weekly says "even though their signature sound on record is brooding and hypnotic, live, the band adds new colors and textures to their sonic paint box. The interplay between the performers and the audience feels passionate and palpable. The phrase "you had to be there" simply doesn't apply in this instance. With The Late Show it feels like you're part of the experience."

Peter Jesperson named it one of his Best of 2018, saying "here in LA, we're rarely treated to full-band shows by Austria's Son of the Velvet Rat so this live recording is especially welcome. Hearing the principals, George & Heike, play with a rhythm section is very exciting," and he adds "don't miss George's lead guitar break on "Do You Love Me?" - it's a knockout."

== Track listing ==
No.	Title	Length
1.	"Little Flower"	2:56
2.	"Copper Hill"	5:28
3.	"Surfer Joe"	4:35
4.	"Moment of Fame"	4:59
5.	"Lovesong No. 9"	4:30
6.	"Do You Love Me?"	4:40
7.	"Friends With God"	3:56
8.	"Sweet Angela"	7:14
9.	"Another Glass of Champagne"	3:27
10.	"Franklin Avenue"	5:42
11.	"Carry On"	3:54
Total length:		52:18

== Personnel ==
- Georg Altziebler – vocals and guitar
- Heike Binder – accordion, keys and backing vocals

=== Additional musicians ===
- Dominik Krejan – Fender Rhodes, piano and backing vocals
- Felix Kruger – drums
- Muck Willmann – drums
