= Scar (Joe Henry album) =

Studio album by Joe Henry
- Released: May 15, 2001
- Recorded: September 7–10 & 27-29, 2000
- Studio: The Sound Factory (Hollywood, California); Sear Sound (New York City, New York)
- Genre: Alternative rock
- Length: 57:59
- Label: Mammoth
- Producer: Craig Street; Joe Henry

Joe Henry chronology
Fuse (1999)	Scar (2001)	Tiny Voices (2003)

Professional ratings
Review scores
Source	Rating
AllMusic	4/5 stars
Alternative Press	8/10
The Guardian	4/5 stars
Los Angeles Times	4/4 stars
Pitchfork	4.0/10
Q	4/5 stars
Rolling Stone	2.5/5 stars
The Rolling Stone Album Guide	3.5/5 stars
Spin	8/10
Uncut	4/5 stars

Scar is the eighth studio album by Joe Henry, released in May 2001 on Mammoth Records. Co-produced by Craig Street, it marked another shift in direction for Henry's music, and a foray into the genres of jazz and soul music. The opening track is a homage to comedian Richard Pryor (whom the album is also dedicated to), and according to Henry's essay "The Ghost in the Song," he was "called by a vision" to collaborate with free jazz artist Ornette Coleman. Henry wrote:

I had a dream. A "vision," I'm tempted to say. And the vision had a voice, and the voice spoke a word: Ornette. It didn't need to speak the other word, for I knew. I needed Ornette Coleman's musical voice to complete the song with which I was at that precise moment struggling.

Henry eventually convinced Coleman to record a solo for the track "Richard Pryor Addresses a Tearful Nation," and also contributed a reprise at the very end of the album as a hidden track. Henry discusses his interactions with Coleman at length as the last part of a 2016 interview.

Another track of note is "Stop", a tango written by Henry. His wife, Melanie, sent an early demo of the track to her sister Madonna, who re-used the lyrics for "Don't Tell Me". Henry often quips during live gigs that "I recorded my version as a tango, and she recorded hers as a hit".

Lizz Wright recorded a jazzy take on "Stop" which she included in her 2005 release Dreaming Wide Awake, also an album produced by Craig Street and recorded by S. Husky Höskulds.

== Track listing ==
All songs written by Joe Henry, except where noted.

1. "Richard Pryor Addresses a Tearful Nation" – 6:21
2. "Stop" – 4:40
3. "Mean Flower" – 4:50
4. "Struck" – 5:24
5. "Rough and Tumble" – 4:53
6. "Lock and Key" – 4:46
7. "Nico Lost One Small Buddha" – 3:23
8. "Cold Enough to Cross" – 3:12
9. "Edgar Bergen" – 6:03
10. "Scar" / hidden track: "Richard Pryor Reprise" (Henry, Ornette Coleman) – 14:22

== Personnel ==
- Joe Henry – vocals, keyboards, guitars, percussion
- Brad Mehldau – acoustic piano
- Marc Ribot – guitars
- Meshell Ndegeocello – bass
- David Piltch (as David Pilch) – bass
- Brian Blade – drums, percussion
- Abe Laboriel Jr. – drums
- Bobby Malach – reeds
- Ornette Coleman – alto saxophone solo

Orchestra (tracks 1, 4 & 9)

- Steven Barber – arrangements and conductor
- Sandra Park – concertmaster
- Bobby Malach – reeds
- Elizabeth Dyson and Gene Moye – cello
- Stacey Shames – harp
- Robert Rinehart – viola
- Sandra Park and Sharon Yamada – violin
- Eric Charleston – vibraphone, percussion

=== Production ===
- Joe Henry – producer
- Craig Street – producer, back cover booklet photography
- S. Husky Höskulds – recording, mixing
- Aaron Franz – assistant engineer
- Todd Parker – assistant engineer
- Adam Samuels – assistant engineer
- Greg Calbi – mastering at Sterling Sound (New York, NY)
- Caroline Sprinkle – production coordinator
- Anabel Sinn – designs
- Rosãngela Rennó – front cover photography
- Henry Diltz – photo of Richard Pryor (1968)
- Melanie Nissen – additional photography
