= Short Man's Room =

Studio album by Joe Henry
- Released: June 16, 1992
- Recorded: June 1991, December 1991
- Genres: Country; alternative country; Americana
- Label: Mammoth
- Producer: Joe Henry

Joe Henry chronology
Shuffletown (1990)	Short Man's Room (1992)	Kindness of the World (1993)

Short Man's Room is an album by the American musician Joe Henry, released on June 16, 1992. He supported it with a North American tour.

== Production ==
The album was produced by Henry, who was backed by the Jayhawks on what he initially intended to be a collection of demos. It was recorded in Minneapolis in June 1991 and December 1991 for around $3,000. Dan Murphy played guitar on two of the tracks. Henry was chiefly influenced by Van Morrison and the Band. He wrote mostly in the first person, even when the songs were not autobiographical. "King's Highway" describes an arbitrary murder. The title track originated with Henry filling an index card with random words, in an attempt to end writer's block. The cover painting is by John Kirby; the original was owned by Henry's sister-in-law Madonna.

== Critical reception ==
Professional ratings
Review scores
Source	Rating
All Music Guide	4/5 stars
Chicago Tribune	3/4 stars
Lincoln Journal Star	A
MusicHound Country: The Essential Album Guide	5/5 stars
The Philadelphia Inquirer	4/4 stars
(The New) Rolling Stone Album Guide	2.5/5 stars
The Virgin Encyclopedia of Nineties Music	3/5 stars

The Chicago Tribune said that "Henry's narrative songs, which are more like vignettes and character sketches than standard rhyming verses, have a slow-burning atmosphere of beauty and regret that is difficult to dismiss or resist." The Lincoln Journal Star praised the "well-etched stories of lovers and losers." The New York Times called the album "a compendium of understated glories, described against acoustic guitar, fiddle, mandolin and brushed drums." The Morning Call panned the "uninspired vocals, hookless songwriting and misfiring lyrics". The Philadelphia Inquirer stated that Henry applies "hard-bitten realism to the conventional singer-songwriter escape fantasies".

== Track listing ==
No.	Title	Length
1.	"Good Fortune"
2.	"Reckless Child"
3.	"Stations"
4.	"Short Man's Room"
5.	"King's Highway"
6.	"The Diving Bell"
7.	"Last One Out"
8.	"Sault Sainte Marie"
9.	"A Friend to You"
10.	"Best to Believe"
11.	"One Shoe On"
