= Kristy Hanson =

American singer-songwriter

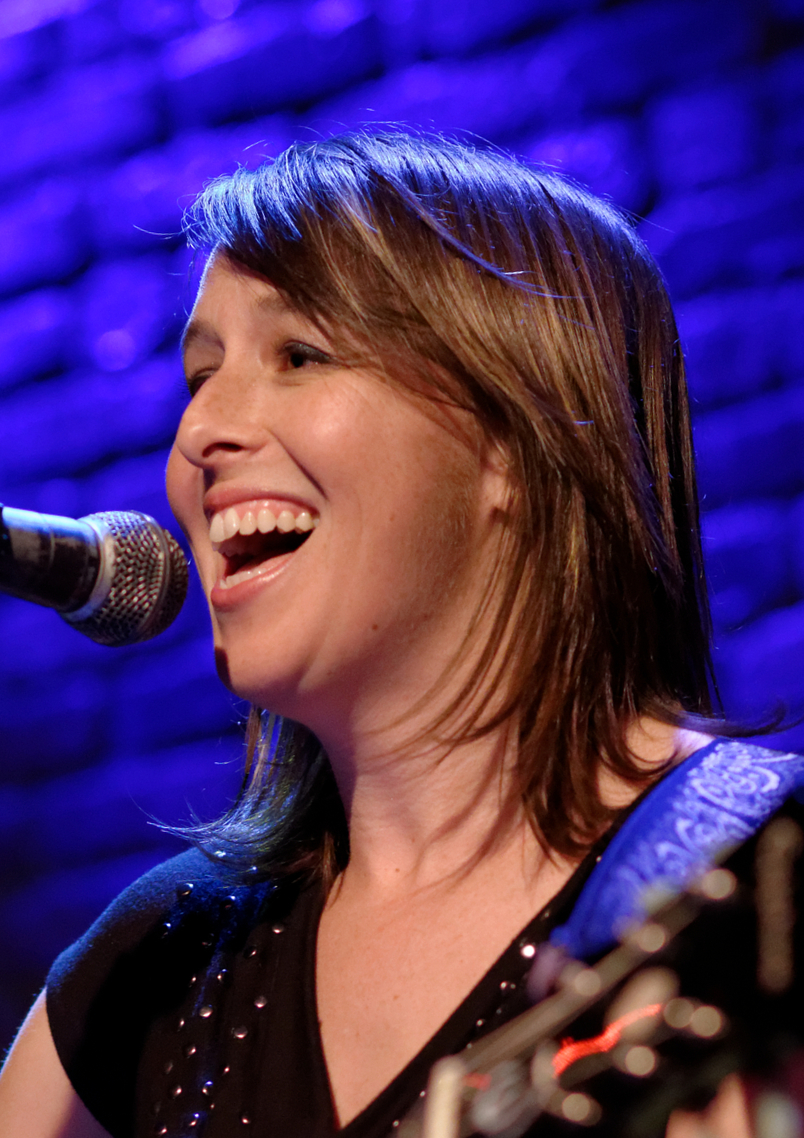
- Kristy Hanson, in 2014

Background information
- Born: June 16, 1981 (age 44)
- Origin: Shaker Heights, Cleveland, United States
- Genres: Folk-Pop
- Years active: 2001–present
- Labels: Independent
- Website: http://www.kristyhanson.com

Kristy Hanson is an American singer-songwriter, who has released a number of folk-pop albums.

== Background ==
Hanson was born in Cleveland, Ohio, where she lived in the Shaker Heights area. Her family moved to south Florida in 1986. She attended the University of Michigan in Ann Arbor from 1999 to 2004, earning degrees in English Language and Literature and vocal performance and studying with former Metropolitan Opera diva Shirley Verrett.

Hanson performed in school and All-State choirs as a child, and began studying voice at 12. She began performing her own songs and other folk music in bookstores and coffee houses as a high school student, after having taken up guitar. Her initial influences included Joni Mitchell, Joan Baez and current folk artists such as the Indigo Girls. Throughout college she performed at Ann Arbor venues, most notably The Blind Pig, and put on several concerts for University of Michigan students. It was during her college years that she released her first two albums, Half the Moon (2001) and She's Been Waiting (2003).

She performs throughout the country, often with other female artists, and she works actively to promote other independent artists as a performing member of Indiegrrl and as the Media/PR Coordinator for Songsalive.

== Discography ==
1. Half the Moon (2001)
2. She's Been Waiting, Relay Records (2003)
3. Already Gone (2007)
4. Into the Quiet (2010)
