= Blood from Stars =

Studio album by Joe Henry
- Released: August 18, 2009
- Recorded: March 16–20, 2009
- Studio: The Garfield House (South Pasadena, California); Avatar (New York City, New York)
- Genre: Blues, experimental, folk rock
- Length: 57:08
- Label: ANTI-
- Producer: Joe Henry

Joe Henry chronology
Civilians (2007)	Blood from Stars (2009)	Reverie (2011)

Professional ratings
Aggregate scores
Source	Rating
Metacritic	77/100
Review scores
Source	Rating
Allmusic	4.5/5 stars
PopMatters	8/10 stars

Blood from Stars is the eleventh studio album by Joe Henry, released in August 2009, and his third release on the ANTI- label.

== Track listing ==
All songs written by Joe Henry, except where noted.

1. "Prelude: Light No Lamp When the Sun Comes Down" – 5:44
2. "The Man I Keep Hid" – 5:05
3. "Channel" – 5:19
4. "This Is My Favorite Cage" – 4:08
5. "Death to the Storm" (Henry, Patrick Warren) – 4:58
6. "All Blues Hail Mary" – 5:33
7. "Bellwether" – 4:02
8. "Progress of Love (Dark Ground)" – 4:27
9. "Over Her Shoulder" – 3:26
10. "Suit on a Frame" – 6:22
11. "Truce" – 3:46
12. "Stars" – 5:13
13. "Coda: Light No Lamp When the Sun Comes Down" – 2:35

== Personnel ==
Production

- Joe Henry – producer, liner notes
- Ryan Freeland – recording, mixing
- Julian Cubillos – engineering assistance
- Kevin Killen – additional recording
- Anabel Sinn – design
- W. Eugene Smith – photography
- David Piltch – editorial guidance

Musicians

- Joe Henry – vocals, acoustic guitar, electric guitars
- Jason Moran - acoustic piano (1)
- Keefus Ciancia – keyboards, acoustic piano, vibraphone
- Patrick Warren – upright piano, tack piano, keyboards, field organ
- Marc Ribot – electric guitars, acoustic guitar, gut-string guitar, Epiphone Coronet, bowed banjo
- David Piltch – electric bass (1–11, 13)
- Jennifer Condos – electric bass (12)
- Jay Bellerose – drums, percussion
- Levon Henry – soprano saxophone, tenor saxophone, clarinet
- Mark Hatch – flugelhorn (8)
- Marc Anthony Thompson – additional vocals

== Cover version ==
In 2012, Tom Jones released a recording of "All Blues Hail Mary" on his studio album, Spirit in the Room.
