= S. Husky Höskulds =

Audio engineer based in the US (born 1969)

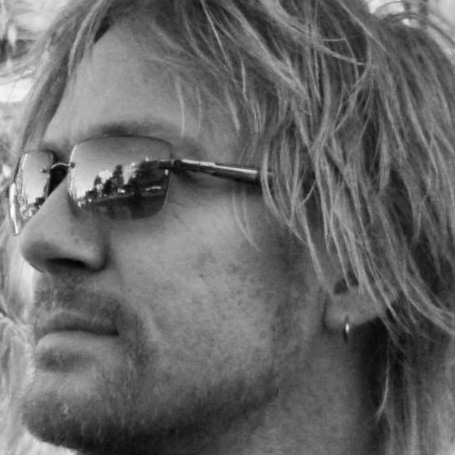
- Höskulds in 2008

Background information
- Born: Steinar Höskuldsson; June 28, 1969 (age 57); Iceland
- Origin: Mosfellsbær
- Occupation: Audio engineer
- Years active: Early 1990s–present
- Website: eightbitaudio.com

S. Husky Höskulds (born in Iceland) is an audio engineer based in Los Angeles, California.

== Biography ==
Husky Höskulds moved to Los Angeles in 1991 to study audio engineering at the University of California, Los Angeles. He began his career working with Mitchell Froom and Tchad Blake as a staff engineer at The Sound Factory in the early 1990s but quickly moved on to independent projects with Michael Penn, The Wallflowers, Sheryl Crow, Tom Waits and a steady collaboration with Mike Patton on his various projects. His important work was with the producers Craig Street and Joe Henry, for whom he also recorded and mixed two of his own albums. In 2002 he won a Grammy for Best Engineered Album, Non-Classical alongside Jay Newland for the multiple awarded debut album Come Away with Me by Norah Jones co-produced by Craig Street.

== Groundlift.org ==
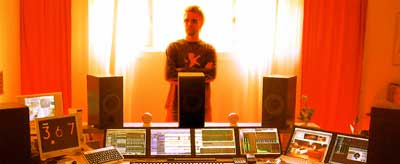
Höskulds (center) at the Groundlift control room

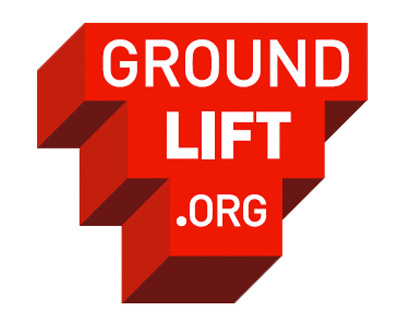
Groundlift.org logo

In 2009 Husky founded the online artist community Groundlift.org. In an effort to bring together artists and collaborators, Ground lift now host to more than 40 artists worldwide, including over 50 albums and other digital artwork and has been tapped for several soundtracks and collaborations.

=== Mission ===
Ground lift is a creative platform, an online community and forum for forward thinking and open minded artists and art lovers. A catalyst in the creation, distribution and sales of all types of digital art, audio and visual… music, photography, video, short films, animation and more.

=== Ground lift Studios ===
Leveraging the latest in digital technology, Husky and his Groundlift team currently operate studios in Los Angeles, Reykjavik and Paris.

== Discography ==
(Sorted by artist)

Year	Artist	Album	Producer	Credits for Höskulds
2002	Solomon Burke	Don't Give Up on Me	Joe Henry	Rec. and mix
2005	Chocolate Genius, Inc.	Black Yankee Rock	Craig Street	Rec. and mix
2006	Elvis Costello & Allen Toussaint	The River in Reverse	Joe Henry	Rec. and mix
1998	Sheryl Crow	The Globe Sessions	Sheryl Crow	Rec.
2005	Ani DiFranco	Knuckle Down	Joe Henry, Ani DiFranco	Rec. and mix
2002	The Dirty Dozen Brass Band	Medicated Magic	Craig Street	Rec. and mix
2013	Matt Duncan	Soft Times	Matt Duncan	Mastering
2001	Fantômas	The Director's Cut	Mike Patton	Rec. and mix
2004	Fantômas	Delìrivm Còrdia	Mike Patton	Rec. and mix (assisted by Mott Lange)
2005	Fantômas	Suspended Animation	Mike Patton	Mix
1998	Lisa Germano	Slide	Tchad Blake	Rec. with Tchad Blake and Lisa Germano
2004	The Gipsy Kings	Roots	Craig Street	Rec. and mix
2001	Joe Henry	Scar	Craig Street, Joe Henry	Rec. and mix
2003	Joe Henry	Tiny Voices	Joe Henry	Rec. and mix
2013	India.Arie	SongVersation	India.Arie	Rec. six tracks with Greg Fuqua, Rob Skipworth a.o.
2002	Norah Jones	Come Away with Me	Craig Street (original tracks)	Rec. three tracks
1998	Gary Jules	Greetings from the Side	Michael Andrews	Mix, assistant to Tchad Blake
1999	Latin Playboys	Dose	Latin Playboys	Assistant with John Paterno to Latin Playboys
2005	Bettye LaVette	I've Got My Own Hell to Raise	Joe Henry	Rec. and mix
2006	John Legend	Once Again	Craig Street a.o.	(Add.) rec. of several tracks with John Paterno a.o.
1999	Los Lobos	This Time	Los Lobos	Add. rec.
2000	The Manhattan Transfer	The Spirit of St. Louis	Craig Street	Rec. and mix
2008	My Brightest Diamond	A Thousand Shark's Teeth	Shara Worden	Mix and master
2014	My Brightest Diamond	This Is My Hand	Zac Rae w/ Shara Worden	Mix and master
2007	Yael Naim	Yael Naim	David Donatien, Yael Naim	Mix and master
1999	Meshell Ndegeocello	Bitter	Craig Street	Additional recording
2010	Meshell Ndegeocello	Devil's Halo	Chris Bruce, Meshell Ndegeocello	Recording (exc. the vocals)
2009	Mike Patton	Crank: High Voltage (O.S.T.)	Mike Patton	Mixing, with Mike Patton
2010	Mike Patton	Mondo Cane	Mike Patton w.o.	Mix
2011	Mike Patton	The Solitude of Prime Numbers (O.S.T.)	Mike Patton	Mastering
2006	Peeping Tom	Peeping Tom	Mike Patton with var. co-prod.	Mix
2000	Michael Penn	MP4 (Days Since a Lost Time Accident)	Michael Penn	Rec. and mix with Michael Penn (and assistants)
2003	Grant-Lee Phillips	Virginia Creeper	Grant-Lee Phillips	Rec. and mix
2006	Grant-Lee Phillips	Strangelet	Grant-Lee Phillips	Mix
2007	Brandi Shearer	Close to Dark	Larry Klein, Brandi Shearer, Ted Savarese	Rec. with Stephen Hart
1999	Vonda Shepard	By 7:30	Mitchell Froom, Vonda Shepard	Rec. with John Paterno
2006	Skerik's Syncopated Taint Septet	Husky	Skerik	Rec. and mix
1998	Soulwax	Much Against Everyone's Advice	David Sardy	Rec. (with Greg Fidelman)
1998	Soul Coughing	El oso	Tchad Blake, Soul Coughing	Rec. assistant to Tchad Blake for most tracks
2002	Turin Brakes	Ether Song	Tony Hoffer	Recording
2004	Vincent & Mr. Green	Vincent & Mr. Green	Vincent & Mr. Green	Mix
2002	Tom Waits	Blood Money	Kathleen Brennan, Tom Waits	Mix of six tracks
2000	The Wallflowers	Breach	Andrew Slater, Michael Penn	Recording
2006	The Wood Brothers	Ways Not to Lose	John Medeski	Rec. with Damien Shannon and Scott Serota, and mix
2005	Lizz Wright	Dreaming Wide Awake	Craig Street	Rec. and mix (assisted by Matthew Cullen a.o.)

Höskulds also worked with Fiona Apple, Susana Baca, Sverrir Bergman, Doyle Bramhall, Edie Brickell, Tracy Chapman, The Derek Trucks Band, Devo, Dr Spock, French for Cartridge, Terra Grimard, Earl Harvin, The Holmes Brothers, Jubilant Sykes, Gabriel Kahane, Wouter Kellerman, Laus, Josh Lopez, Aimee Mann, Emi Meyer, Minus, Eliza Moore, My Brightest Diamond, Dave Palmer, Vanessa Paradis, Ann Peebles, Sam Phillips, David Piltch and Friends, Billy Preston, Skinny Puppy, Susheela Raman, Toshi Reagon, Hemlock Smith, Mavis Staples, Jennifer Terran, Irma Thomas, Richard Thompson, Amali Ward and others.
