= Sky Is Falling (Natalie Duncan song) =

Single by Natalie Duncan

from the album Devil in Me
- Released: 30 March 2012
- Recorded: 2011
- Genre: Soul; blues
- Length: 4:19 (radio mix)
- Label: Verve
- Songwriter(s): Natalie Duncan
- Producer(s): Joe Henry

Natalie Duncan singles chronology
"Sky Is Falling" (2012)	"Find Me a Home" (2012)

"Sky Is Falling" is the debut single by British singer and songwriter Natalie Duncan. The single is taken from her debut album Devil in Me. The single was released on 30 March 2012.

== Music video ==
A promotional video for the song was uploaded to YouTube in April 2012. The video features computer animation as well as live action shots of Natalie at the piano.

== Track listings ==
Digital download

1. "Sky Is Falling" (radio mix) – 4:19
2. "While You Wait for the Others" (Grizzly Bear cover) – 4:59
