= Shine a Light (Billy Bragg and Joe Henry album) =

2016 live album by Billy Bragg and Joe Henry

Shine a Light: Field Recordings from the Great American Railroad
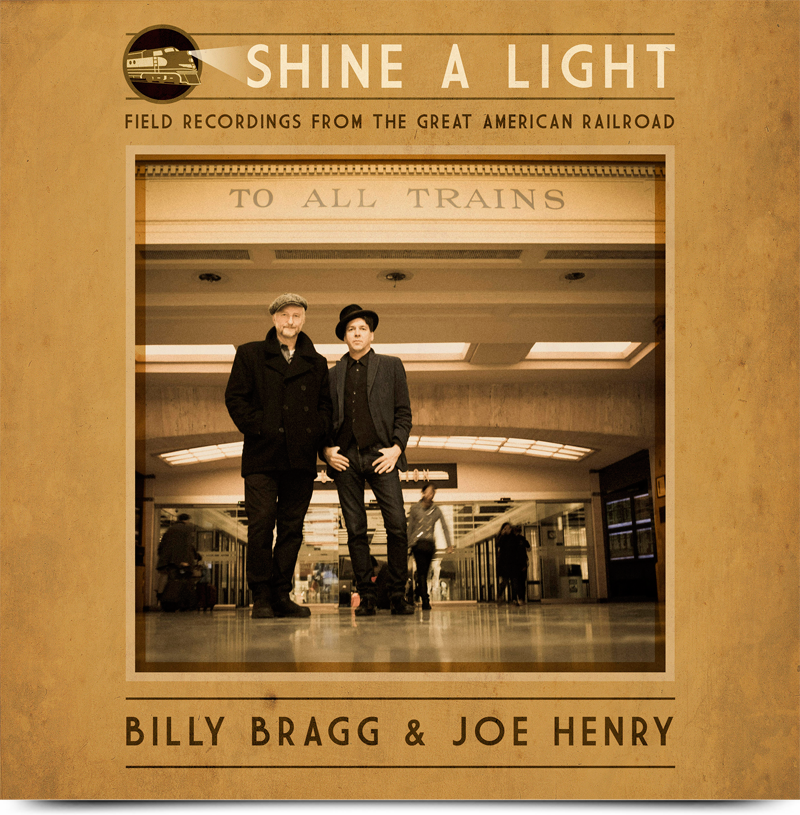

Live album by Billy Bragg and Joe Henry
- Released: 23 September 2016
- Recorded: Various railway stations between Chicago and Los Angeles March 2016
- Genre: Folk
- Length: 42:58
- Label: Cooking Vinyl
- Producer: Billy Bragg, Joe Henry

Billy Bragg chronology
Tooth & Nail (2013)	Shine a Light: Field Recordings from the Great American Railroad (2016)	Bridges Not Walls (2017)

Joe Henry chronology
Invisible Hour (2014)	Shine A Light (2016)	Thrum (2017)

Professional ratings
Review scores
Source	Rating
AllMusic	3/5 stars
The Arts Desk	3/5 stars
The Guardian	3/5 stars
PopMatters	8/10 stars

Shine a Light: Field Recordings from the Great American Railroad is a 2016 album of field recordings made by British singer Billy Bragg and American musician Joe Henry as they performed in waiting rooms and trackside at railway stations on a journey between Chicago and Los Angeles in March 2016. The project was conceived after Henry produced Bragg's thirteenth studio album Tooth & Nail at his home studio in South Pasadena. It was released on the Cooking Vinyl label on 23 September 2016. The project is named after a lyric in the traditional folk song "Midnight Special" (mistakenly credited to Lead Belly after a 1934 recording he made).

== Recording ==
In March 2016, English singer-songwriter Billy Bragg and fellow troubadour and producer Joe Henry set off from Chicago's Union Station with the intention of "reconnect[ing] with the culture of American railroad travel and the music it inspired". They undertook a 2,700-mile, 65-hour train ride recording songs that "reflect the railroad’s impact on the nation’s social and cultural life". Goebel Reeves's "Hobo's Lullaby" (well known from Woody Guthrie performances) was captured at an Amtrak station in Alpine, Texas; the folk ballad Railroad Bill at St Louis Gateway station, "Lonesome Whistle" by Hank Williams in a sleeping berth near Whistle Junction, Missouri.

A short documentary Shine a Light by director Ray Foley was made of the trip and streamed for free on the official website.

== Track listing ==
All songs performed by Billy Bragg and Joe Henry; music composers are listed below.

1. "Rock Island Line" (traditional, arranged by Billy Bragg and Joe Henry) – 2:55
2. "The L&N Don't Stop Here Any More" (Jean Ritchie) – 4:29
3. "Midnight Special" (Huddie Ledbetter) – 3:34
4. "Railroad Bill" (traditional, arranged by Billy Bragg and Joe Henry) – 2:49
5. "Lonesome Whistle" (Hank Williams; Jimmie Davis) – 2:53
6. "KC Moan" (Tewee Blackman) – 2:40
7. "Waiting for a Train" (Jimmie Rodgers) – 2:46
8. "In the Pines" (traditional, arranged by Billy Bragg and Joe Henry) – 3:31
9. "Gentle on My Mind" (John Hartford) – 3:39
10. "Hobo's Lullaby" (Goebel Reeves) – 3:57
11. "Railroading on the Great Divide" (Sara Carter) – 3:08
12. "John Henry" (traditional, arranged by Billy Bragg and Joe Henry) – 2:42
13. "Early Morning Rain" (Gordon Lightfoot) – 4:13

== Personnel ==
- Billy Bragg – acoustic guitar, electric guitar, vocals
- Joe Henry – acoustic guitar, electric guitar, harmonica, vocals
- Ryan Freeland - engineer, mixing
