= Tiny Voices =

Studio album by Joe Henry
- Released: September 23, 2003
- Recorded: 2002–2003
- Studio: Sunset Sound Recorders (Hollywood, California)
- Genre: Folk rock, jazz, experimental
- Length: 65:51
- Label: ANTI-
- Producer: Joe Henry

Joe Henry chronology
Scar (2001)	Tiny Voices (2003)	Civilians (2007)

Professional ratings
Review scores
Source	Rating
AllMusic	4/5 stars

Tiny Voices is the ninth studio album by Joe Henry, released in September 2003, and his first release on the ANTI- label. Tiny Voices features a unique production sound, quite discordant and unpolished in comparison to Henry's previous album Scar in 2001. Joe assembled a group of accomplished musicians, and provided them only with basic demo versions of each song. From there, he asked the musicians to "learn" the songs while they were being recorded. Henry felt this more ungroomed approach was in alignment with the themes of the album.

The song "Flesh and Blood" was originally written by Henry for Solomon Burke to record on Don't Give Up on Me, Burke's Grammy-award-winning album, which Henry produced. The song "Animal Skin" was previously recorded by Joe for the Groundwork: Act to Reduce Hunger charity album.

== Track listing ==
All tracks composed by Joe Henry.

1. "This Afternoon" – 5:44
2. "Animal Skin" – 5:54
3. "Tiny Voices" – 6:41
4. "Sold" – 5:29
5. "Dirty Magazine" – 4:38
6. "Flag" – 5:09
7. "Loves You Madly" – 4:10
8. "Lighthouse" – 5:11
9. "Widows of the Revolution" – 4:38
10. "Leaning" – 5:24
11. "Flesh and Blood" – 5:34
12. "Your Side of My World" – 7:19

== Personnel ==
- Joe Henry – vocals, guitars
- Dave Palmer – keyboards
- Patrick Warren – keyboards
- Chris Bruce – guitars
- Gregg Arreguin – guitars (9)
- Jennifer Condos – bass
- Jay Bellerose – drums (1–5, 7–12), percussion
- Jim Keltner – drums (6)
- Don Byron – tenor saxophone, bass clarinet, clarinet
- Ron Miles – trumpet
- Niki Haris – additional vocals
- Jean McClain – additional vocals

=== Production ===
- Joe Henry – producer
- S. Husky Hoskulds – recording, mixing
- Craig Conard – assistant engineer
- Jason Mott – assistant engineer
- Gavin Lurssen – mastering at The Mastering Lab (Hollywood, California)
- Anabel Sinn – design
- Seymour Mednick – front cover photography
- Melanie Nissen – additional photography
