= Already Gone (album) =

Studio album by Kristy Hanson
- Released: June 6, 2007
- Recorded: August 21–25 at Stampede Origin by Ryan Freeland
- Genre: Folk
- Length: 26:00
- Producers: Mike Chiaburu and Kristy Hanson

Kristy Hanson chronology
She's Been Waiting (2003)	Already Gone (2007)	Into the Quiet (2010)

Professional ratings
Review scores
Source	Rating
PopMatters	7/10 stars

Already Gone is an album by Kristy Hanson released in 2007.

== Track listing ==
1. "Comfort" (Hanson) – 2:14
2. "Swansong" (Hanson) – 3:20
3. "Already Gone" (Hanson) – 2:44
4. "Wake Up" (Hanson) – 3:17
5. "Careful" (Hanson) – 3:52
6. "It's Not Over" (Hanson) – 2:27
7. "Let Me Out of This House" (Hanson) – 3:14
8. "Who Can Say" (Hanson) – 2:39
9. "Peace of Mind" (Hanson) – 3:21
10. "Packed My Bags" (Hanson) – 2:15

== Personnel ==
- Jay Bellerose - drums, percussion
- Mike Chiaburu - upright bass
- Ryan Freeland - recording engineer, mixing, organ on 10
- Kristy Hanson - vocals, acoustic guitar
- Gavin Lurssen - mastering engineer
- Patrick Warren - keyboards (1, 2, 4, 5)
