= Natalie Duncan =

British soul musician (born 1988)

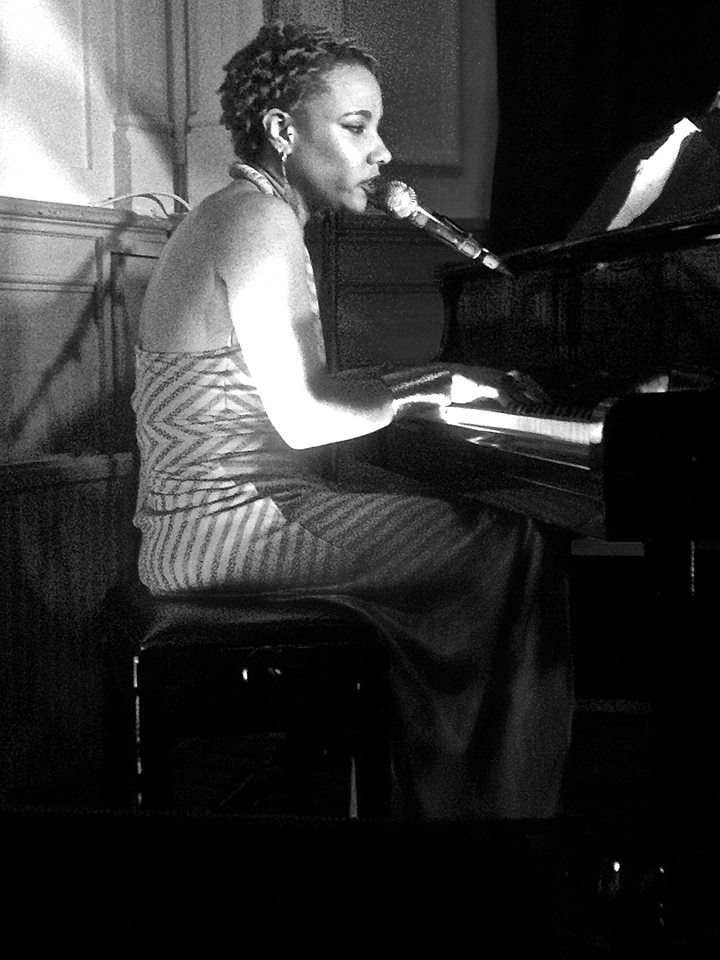
- Natalie Duncan performing in London, 2014

Background information
- Born: Natalie Alexis Duncan; 1988 (age 37–38); Croydon, London, England
- Genres: Soul; blues
- Occupations: Singer; songwriter
- Instruments: Vocals; piano
- Years active: 2009–present
- Label: Verve
- Website: natalieduncan.com

Natalie Alexis Duncan (born 1988) is an English soul musician from Nottingham. She is currently signed to Goldie's record imprint Fallen Tree 1Hundred. Duncan released her eponymous debut EP Natalie Alexis Duncan under the Farmyard Records label in 2009, shortly after which she was selected as one of a group of young musicians chosen to take part in the BBC Two series Goldie's Band: By Royal Appointment, which was broadcast in March and April 2011. On the back of her appearance on the programme, Duncan was offered a recording contract with Verve Records and began recording her debut album in early 2011, produced by Joe Henry, with the majority of recording sessions taking place at Real World Studios. The lead single from the album "Sky Is Falling" was released in March 2012, followed by the album Devil In Me on 16 July 2012. After the release of her Black & White EP in 2015, her second studio album Free was released on 31 July 2020 via Fallen Tree 1Hundred.

== Early life ==
Duncan was born in Croydon, London to a Jamaican mother and a half English, half Greek father. She moved to Nottingham in 1991, where she grew up. She displayed a keen interest in music as a child and at age of three composed her first original tune on a tiny toy keyboard. She commenced piano lessons at age of five and, preferring to learn by ear rather than by conventional sight reading, she pursued the ABRSM Jazz Piano syllabus, obtaining her grade 5 qualification when she was 14. Her musical influences were quite eclectic – her father had an extensive record collection with a large black music content, as a young child she listened to classical music on The Magical Music Box, and she was taken to see Jools Holland and his Big Band on her 11th birthday, whilst all the time listening to a wide array of music of her choice. Duncan first sang in public at age og ten in Junior school, and at age 15 she won the year 11 music competition at her Secondary school, singing and playing an Alicia Keys cover. She had also been writing her own songs from quite an early age. She left school to attend New College Nottingham where she obtained a BTEC HNC in music in 2007.

== Music career ==
Duncan started off playing solo gigs at open mic venues around Nottingham, and singing with local bands, before signing to local record label Farmyard Records, for whom she recorded the EP Natalie Alexis Duncan, (no longer available) in 2009. Her break came in 2010 when she featured in a programme the BBC were making about 12 young musicians from around the UK, who had used music as a means to overcome various difficulties they had all experienced. The programme was the brainchild of drum and bass pioneer Goldie; a three part series, Goldie's Band By Royal Appointment told each young musician's story, then set them all the task of writing 12 songs to be performed at a live concert in Buckingham Palace in front of special guest Prince Harry. Following this she was signed by Verve Records, and recorded her debut album Devil In Me at Peter Gabriel's Real World Studios. Produced by Joe Henry it was recorded "live" in just two weeks with renowned session musicians Greg Cohen, Earl Harvin, John Smith and Patrick Warren. The album was released in 2012 to critical acclaim. In September of that year she appeared on the BBC programme Later... with Jools Holland, the same episode also featured the British rock band Muse, who she went on to support at the commencement of their European tour. The following year she appeared on Nottingham's influential radio show NottinghamLive (on Trent Sound) hosted by renowned broadcaster Steve Oliver. She also provided vocals for the Disclosure track "Apollo", from Settle: The Remixes. She included a cover of the Etta James hit "At Last" on her Find Me a Home EP. The song was featured in an advert for Auto Trader in the UK.

In 2014, Duncan parted ways with her record label Verve Records. Her new EP Black & White was released onto digital platforms on 2 February 2015. The EP marks a new direction for Duncan offering a more overall electronic influence than her previous material. She released another single, "Kingston", on 24 July 2015 under UX Records. Duncan released a new single titled "Lies" on 28 August 2015. The song garnered over 50,000 listens on Spotify within the first month of its release and currently has over 600,000 listens.

In July 2020, Duncan released her second studio album Free under Goldie's Fallen Tree 1Hundred label.

== Artistry ==
Duncan's style draws on her influences ranging from Nina Simone, Pink Floyd, The Rolling Stones, Grizzly Bear, Aretha Franklin, Radiohead, Elliott Smith, Jeff Buckley, Jimi Hendrix and Bob Dylan. She has been compared to the likes of Alicia Keys, Amy Winehouse, Norah Jones and Nina Simone.

== Discography ==
=== Albums ===
Title	Details
Devil In Me	Released: 16 July 2012; Label: Verve; Format: CD, digital download
Free	Released: 31 July 2020; Label: Fallen Tree 1Hundred; Format: CD, digital download

=== Extended plays ===
Title	Details
Live in Real World Studios	Released: 16 March 2012; Label: Verve; Format: Digital download
Find Me a Home	Released: 14 September 2012; Label: Verve; Format: Digital download
Find Me a Home (Remixes)	Released: 26 October 2012; Label: Verve; Format: Digital download
iTunes Festival: London 2012	Released: 26 October 2012; Label: Decca; Format: Digital download
Black & White	Released: 16 March 2015; Label: UX; Format: Digital download

=== Singles ===
Title	Details
"Sky Is Falling"	Released: 30 March 2012
"Find Me a Home"	Released: 14 September 2012
"Black & White"	Released: 23 February 2015
"Kingston"	Released: 14 July 2015
"Lies"	Released: 28 August 2015
"Hearts in a Cage"	Released: 17 June 2022

=== Promotional singles ===
List of singles, with selected chart positions
Title	Year	Peak chart positions	Album
Title	Year	JPN	Album
"Devil In Me"	2012	90	Devil In Me

== Collaborations ==
Artist	Year	Title	Comments
Goldie	2012	"Freedom"	The song was also included on Goldie's 2012 compilation album The Alchemist: Best Of 1992–2012.
Disclosure	2013	"Apollo"	The song was also included on Disclosure's 2013 remix album Settle: The Remixes.
DJ Q	2015	"Oh My God"	A remix of Duncan's song "Oh My God" from her EP Black & White. Credited as "DJ Q vs. Natalie Duncan."
Dom & Roland	2016	"Sacrifice"	Track from the highly acclaimed album "Last Refuge of a Scoundrel" on Goldie's Metalhead label
Goldie	2017	"Redemption"	Track from the album The Journey Man

=== Music videos ===
List of music videos, showing year released and director
Title	Year	Director
"Find Me a Home"	2012	Joe Elliott
