= Fuse (Joe Henry album) =

Studio album by Joe Henry
- Released: March 9, 1999
- Studios: Kingsway (New Orleans, Louisiana); Sound City (Van Nuys, California); Sonora Recorders, Zeitgeist, and Anthony's Body & Fender Shop (Los Angeles, California)
- Genre: Alternative country
- Length: 49:11
- Label: Mammoth
- Producers: Joe Henry; T Bone Burnett

Joe Henry chronology
Trampoline (1996)	Fuse (1999)	Scar (2001)

Fuse is an album by Joe Henry, released in 1999.

== Production ==
The album was co-produced by T Bone Burnett, and partly mixed by Daniel Lanois. Henry initially attempted to have Dr. Dre produce Fuse.

== Critical reception ==
Professional ratings
Review scores
Source	Rating
AllMusic	3/5 stars
Entertainment Weekly	B+
Los Angeles Times	3/4 stars
Pitchfork	8.5/10
Spin	8/10

The A.V. Club wrote that the album "continues to develop Trampoline's spooky style of bluesy Americana." The Chicago Reader wrote that "the entire album exudes a kind of sweet, danceable darkness, with sparse drum loops, moody bass lines, and delicate guitar and synthesizer washes."

== Track listing ==
All songs written by Joe Henry except where noted

1. "Monkey" – 4:01
2. "Angels" – 5:42
3. "Fuse" – 4:18
4. "Skin and Teeth" – 3:52
5. "Fat" – 3:25
6. "Want Too Much" – 5:44
7. "Curt Flood" – 3:49
8. "Like She Was a Hammer" – 4:27
9. "Great Lake" – 5:31
10. "Beautiful Hat" - 3:57
11. "We'll Meet Again" (Ross Parker, Hughie Charles) – 4:25

== Personnel ==
- Joe Henry – vocals (1–6, 8–11), keyboards (1, 2, 5, 7, 10) guitars (1–5, 7, 10), percussion (1, 7, 10), organ (2), bass (10), fun machine - left hand (11)
- Jamie Muhoberac – acoustic piano (3, 4, 6), keyboards (3, 6, 9, 10), organ (3, 4, 6, 7), electric piano (6), Minimoog (7, 8), fun machine (8)
- Dave Palmer – keyboards (4), acoustic piano (8)
- Rami Jaffee – electric piano (5), vibraphone (5)
- Daniel Lanois – clavinet (6), bass (6)
- Richard Barron – fun machine - right hand (11)
- Randy Jacobs – guitars (1–4, 6, 9), talkbox (2), bass (3)
- Chris Whitley – guitars (4, 8)
- Anthony Wilson – guitars (7)
- Jennifer Condos – bass (1, 2, 4, 5, 8)
- Greg Richling – bass (5)
- Freddie "Ready Freddie" Washington – bass (6, 7, 9)
- Carla Azar – drums (1, 2, 4, 5, 8)
- Curt Bisquera – drums (3, 6, 9), percussion (3)
- Ralph Peters – percussion (11)
- Clay Carroll – bells (11)
- K.R. King – alto saxophone (2)
- Brian Swartz – trumpet (6)
- Jakob Dylan – vocals (4)
- Jean McClain – vocals (8)

The Dirty Dozen Brass Band on "Beautiful Hat"

- Kevin Harris – saxophones
- Roger Lewis – saxophones
- Revert Andrews – trombone
- Gregory Davis – trumpet
- Efrem Towns – trumpet

Strings on "We'll Meet Again"

- Brian Korby – arrangements and conductor
- Louis Duddley – cello
- B. B. Bryson – double bass
- Lynn Lawlor and Patty Peritore – viola
- Marilyn Fellows, Carmen Katona, Dot Libran and Bob Wingate – violin

Production

- Joe Henry – producer, recording
- T-Bone Burnett – additional production, mixing (1–5, 7–10)
- Ethan Allen – recording
- Richard Barron – recording, mixing (11)
- Mike Piersante – recording
- Rick Will – mixing (1–5, 7–10)
- Daniel Lanois – mixing (6)
- Nick Raskulinecz – assistant engineer
- Sam Storey – assistant engineer
- Mike Terry – assistant engineer
- Joe Gastwirt – mastering at Oceanview Digital Mastering (Los Angeles, California)
- Frank Gargiulo – art direction, design
- Melanie Nissen – art direction, photography
- Alex Dizon – hair
- Aja – make-up
- Kelly K. – styling
