= Son of the Velvet Rat =

Austrian folk noir band

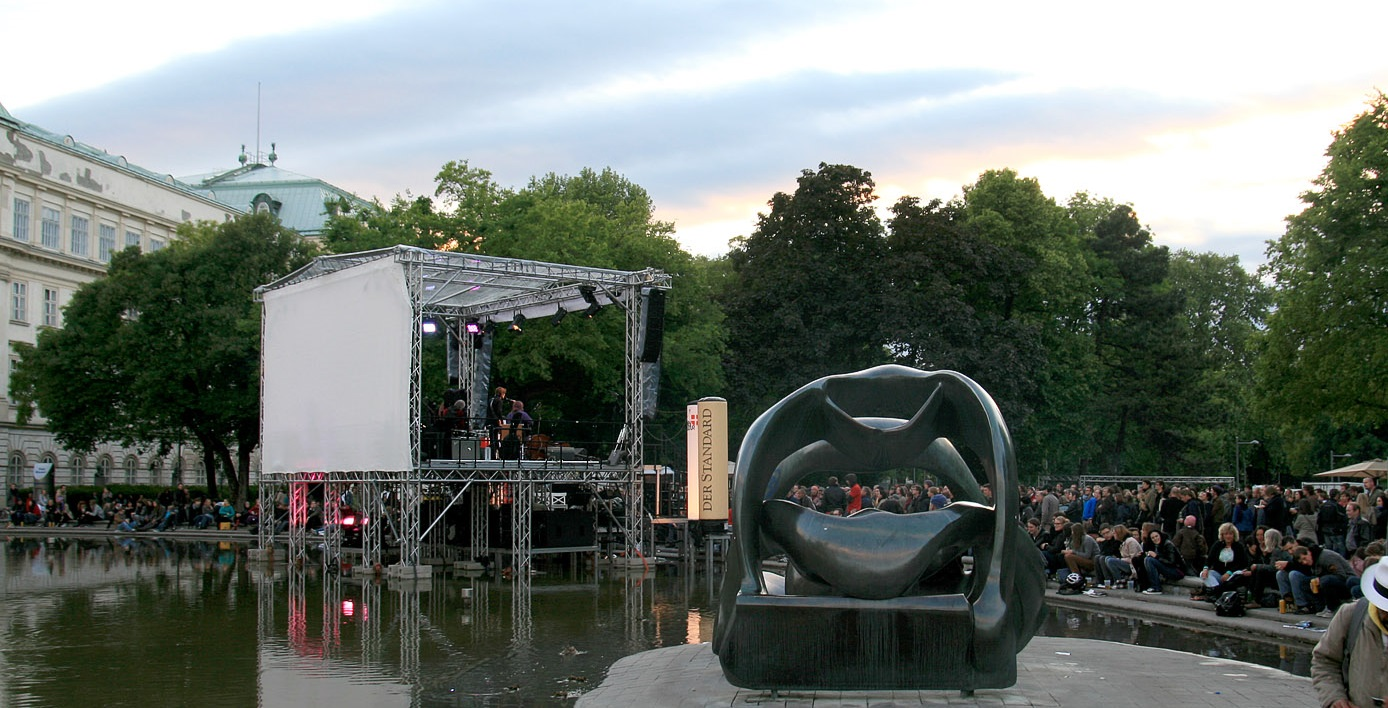
- Son of the Velvet Rat at Popfest 2011, Vienna, Austria.

Background information
- Origin: Austria
- Genres: Indie rock, folk noir folk rock
- Years active: 2003–present
- Labels: Starfish, Monkey, Fluff & Gravy, Mint 400 Records
- Members: Georg Altziebler; Heike Binder
- Website: sonofthevelvetrat.com

Son of the Velvet Rat is a folk noir band from Austria currently based in Joshua Tree, California, United States.

== History ==
Son of the Velvet Rat was founded in 2003 by Austrian songwriter Georg Altziebler and organist and accordionist Heike Binder. Their style is described as folk noir, folk rock, garage rock and Americana, and they cite musical inspiration from Townes Van Zandt, Georges Brassens and Dead Moon. Son of the Velvet Rat have also drawn comparisons to Bob Dylan, Leonhard Cohen, Tom Waits, Nick Cave and Radiohead.

The band started out with the sparsely instrumented releases, Spare Some Sugar [For the Rat] and By My Side, by the California indie label Starfish Records. In 2006, they were signed by Vienna indie label Monkey, and released the album Playground, which focuses on love, loneliness and pain. The album Loss & Love was released in 2007, and the song "Fall With Me" reached No. 3 on the FM4 charts, and No. 47 on their 2007 chart. In 2008, Son of the Velvet Rat was nominated for the Amadeus Austrian Music Award in the Alternative category, and they performed on BalconyTV. The album Animals was released in 2009. Both Loss & Love and Animals were produced by Ken Coomer. Wiener Zeitung named Red Chamber Music the Best Austrian Album of the Year in 2011, and it reached No. 52 on the Austria Top 40. The album features a collaboration with Lucinda Williams, and liner notes by Peter Jesperson.

Altziebler was named Best Austrian Singer/Songwriter ever in 2012, by Kurier. That year, he also published a collection of song lyrics in his book Songs. Their following release, Firedancer, also received the title Best Austrian Album of the Year, and reached No. 61 on the [Austria Top 40. It was released in the US on 21 March 2014.

In addition, two compilation albums have been released by Monkey, beginning with Monkey Years in 2010 and followed in 2020 by Monkey Years 2.

Son of the Velvet Rat toured throughout the United States and Europe. Some of their records have been released by the South Korean label, Polyphone.

=== Fluff and Gravy / Mint 400 Records ===
In 2016, Altziebler and Binder moved to California, and signed with the New Jersey label Mint 400 Records and the Portland-based label Fluff & Gravy. A second collection of song lyrics was published by Altziebler in 2016, in the book entitled Songs #2. The album Dorado was released on 17 February 2017, and was produced by Joe Henry. A positive review in Dagger says "you could call this stuff desert noir and probably get away with it[;] this is the kind of Grade A music that doesn't come along very often so soak it all in when it does. This record is a keeper." The Late Show was released in 2017. It is a live album that was recorded from three shows in Vienna, Austria, Wredenhagen, Germany and Burbank, California for their 2017 tour supporting Dorado. Peter Jesperson named it one of his "Best of 2018."

Following the 2020 release of Monkey Years 2 by Son of the Velvet Rat's former Austrian label Monkey, their new album Solitary Company, which was co-produced by Altziebler and Gar Robertson, was released on 19 March 2021. While highly evocative of the Mojave Desert landscape referenced in the lyrics (also the album's recording location), the songs of Solitary Company have a way of taking listeners “to so many places with subtle tones and gestures” through “ten song-shaped stories that appear to tell themselves without effort,” as is described in the end-notes written by Robert Rotifer. “We might be in a film noir...or in the middle of a climate change-induced apocalypse...For all of its local references, this is far too surreal to be a folk record. Rather, it inhabits ‘a secret parallel world behind the clouds’ [from the lyrics of ‘Beautiful Disarray’],” writes Rotifer.

== Members ==
- Georg Altziebler – vocals and guitar
- Heike Binder – accordion, organ, theremin, drums and vocals

== Discography ==
Albums

- By My Side (2003)
- Playground (2006)
- Loss & Love (2007)
- Animals (2009)
- Red Chamber Music (2011)
- Reaper (2012)
- Firedancer (2013)
- Live Tape (2012)
- Dorado (2017)
- The Late Show (2018)
- Solitary Company (2021)

EPs

- Spare Some Sugar [For the Rat] (2003)
- Alpha Suite (2004)
- Gravity (2008)
- Desert Songs (2015)
- Desert Songs 2 (2018)

Compilations

- Monkey Years (2010)
- Monkey Years 2 (2020)

Videos

- "Are the Angels Pretty?" (2007), directed by Ford Brothers
- "White Patch of Canvas" (2012), directed Paul Kranzler
- "Blood Red Shoes" (2017), directed by Diane Best, post production at Studio D, Joshua Tree
- "Solitary Company" (2021), directed by Heidi Fial
- "When the Lights go down" (2021), directed by Gordon Clark
- "Beautiful Disarray" (2021), directed by Heidi Fial
