= Trampoline (Joe Henry album) =

Studio album by Joe Henry
- Released: 1996
- Recorded: October 1994 – June 1995
- Studio: Sonora Recorders, Anthony's Body and Fender Shop and Record One (Los Angeles, California); Ocean Way Recording (Hollywood, California); Kingsway Studios (New Orleans, Louisiana)
- Genre: Alternative rock
- Length: 41:41
- Label: Mammoth
- Producer: Pat McCarthy; Joe Henry

Joe Henry chronology
Kindness of the World (1993)	Trampoline (1996)	Fuse (1999)

Professional ratings
Review scores
Source	Rating
AllMusic	3.5/5 stars
Entertainment Weekly	A−
The Guardian	4/5 stars
NME	8/10
Pitchfork	8.1/10
Rolling Stone	3/5 stars
The Rolling Stone Album Guide	4/5 stars
Spin	8/10
USA Today	3.5/4 stars

Trampoline is the sixth studio album by Joe Henry, released in 1996. It featured a musical collaboration between Henry and guitarist Page Hamilton of alternative metal band Helmet and included a cover version of "Let Me Have It All" from Sly and the Family Stone's 1973 Fresh album.

== Background ==
Interviewed on the Sessions at West 54th TV show in 1998, Henry said when he began making Trampoline, he was determined to learn a new way to work. "Usually because I didn't have enough money and I didn't know how to work any other way. Just live in the studio. Get a band, circle the wagons, and then just kind of have at it. And it's more like making a documentary film, you get what you get, problems and all. More like live theater. And I wanted to think more like a filmmaker, I wanted to be able to manipulate things more. And work on it in bits and pieces and I started by setting up a little studio at home and exactly that.

"I came up with a drum loop first, and thought, 'Jeez, I've never written, here's a rhythm, I've never operated under this umbrella. Let's do this one.' And then make myself write to that. And, I just learned to work backwards. I think it's good to be disoriented to a certain degree."

Henry said producer Patrick McCarthy, who had worked with U2 and Robbie Robertson, helped reshape his approach to songwriting and production. "When you begin a career in music, people hear where you are and assume that that's all you are. And if you're not careful, you might start assuming the same thing. I did, for a while, hear my 'voice' as a writer, producer and singer, and believe it was all that was available to me. And it's funny in retrospect to think that I could have been frustrated to the point of quitting without thinking first that maybe I just ought to learn a new way to work. But once someone put my nose in it—that someone being my new co-producer Patrick McCarthy—I felt liberated for the first time; the recording process now becoming as much 'a process' as writing had always been.

"The turning point was in taking a bit of my recording budget and setting up a studio in my garage, allowing me to work whenever I wanted, piece by piece; allowing me to write to new rhythms, record to loops, play bass, and steal like a thief with my sampler. I was free from the role of Boy Scout Leader, which is how I always felt trying to lead six or more players in the studio during 'live' sessions. And as I learned all this, I made a record called Trampoline, which again, felt like starting over from scratch. I wrote backwards: from the groove up instead of letting lyrics dictate everything. I was also writing lyrics that were less narrative and more fragmented, in a way that I hoped the music was. I was using technology, but like a primitive, and many beautiful mistakes resulted."

== Inspiration and production ==
Henry said it was widely, though wrongly, assumed that "Ohio Air Show Plane Crash"—a love song written around an aircraft crash—was inspired by a real event. "I just thought that it was a really funny title. I walked around with that for months. And, I think the idea was just the beginning. The song starts just before the crash and I was trying to think, 'You know, what happens before this crash?' I was just trying to place a really small story about two people and using this tragedy as a backdrop. Thinking it was funny to set up this big thing and then not really refer to it. The real story is a smaller thing that's happening in front of it. I can't tell you how many people, when I did an interview, asked me if I had, since the last record, survived or witnessed a terrible crash ... I'm always startled that people don't assume that if you're a songwriter that you're probably a fiction writer."

He said his inclusion of the Sly and the Family Stone song came about almost by accident. "I was listening to a lot of Sly Stone over the past two years. I recorded that in my garage one day just trying to clear my head. I think I was stuck on another song that wouldn't be beat into submission and to try and get away from it I just recorded a drum machine part and a bass and a vocal. As luck would have it, my friend Page Hamilton happened to be in Los Angeles recording for a soundtrack and I invited him over one evening to play guitar on it, purely for sport, and only much later did I think of it as a piece of the puzzle, that I recognized that it lyrically and sonically fit with the record. I just assumed it was a catalyst for Page and me starting to work together and I brought him back to do a few more days of recording. But it was much, much after the fact."

He said "Flower Girl" marked his first use of sampling. "I'd recorded my first version of that song as a country song in New Orleans and was very irritated by it. It didn't work. It was innocuous and went by like a blur. I put down a minimal pump organ thing for it and then forgot about it. I got back to Los Angeles a month later and was in the studio with the engineer. He started with a Vari-Speed drum loop which sounded like an army marching and the pump organ and my vocal only. Everything else went out the window at that moment. I was trying to get to something like a Bunuel movie where things came in and out of view like when you're riding a train or in a car and things come into field and out with no precedent for it. Something blossoms and then fades completely. That evening we started playing with samples ... we had this old Spanish opera record in the studio and were sampling it in the most primitive way—we dropped the needle and got lucky a few times. It made the song three-dimensional for me. It had its own life from then on. I instinctively knew it was the right thing to do. I'd never played with samples before because I never had the tools to do it. It was like making collages and cutting up a magazine, having these little events that happen. I'm probably as proud of that song as I was with anything on the recording—I was delighted with the tone of it."

== Track listing ==
All songs written by Joe Henry, except where noted

1. "Bob & Ray" – 3:45
2. "Ohio Air Show Plane Crash" – 6:30
3. "Trampoline" – 4:35
4. "Flower Girl" – 2:58
5. "Let Me Have It All" (Sylvester Stewart) – 5:12
6. "Medicine" – 5:03
7. "Go With God (Topless Shoeshine)" – 4:43
8. "I Was a Playboy" – 4:33
9. "Parade" – 4:20

== Personnel ==
- Joe Henry – vocals, keyboards (1, 3), acoustic guitar (1, 2, 7–9), tremolo guitar (1, 6), bass (1, 5, 9), electric guitars (2, 3), pump organ (4, 9), machinery (9)
- Pat McCarthy – keyboards (5)
- Page Hamilton – electric guitars (1, 2, 5, 6, 9)
- Bucky Baxter – zither (1), pedal steel guitar (9)
- Eric Heywood – pedal steel guitar (2, 7)
- Mike Russell – bass (2, 6), pump organ (6), banjo (7), organ pedals (7)
- Carla Azar – drums (1–3, 5, 6), percussion (1)
- Tim O'Reagan – drums (2, 4, 7), percussion (2)
- Mark Mullins – trombone (8)
- Sonny Glare – orchestral arrangements (4)
- Raul Ferrando – string arrangements (8)
- Daryl Johnson – voices (2), bass (3), goat bells (6), steeple bells (6)
- Miranda Dade-Lurie – vocal soloist (4)
- Ames Township Barber's Choir – choir (4)
- The Angelettes – backing vocals (5)

=== Production ===
- Joe Henry – producer, recording, mixing
- Pat McCarthy – producer, recording, mixing
- Richard Barron – assistant engineer
- Richard Huredia – assistant engineer
- Trina Shoemaker – assistant engineer
- Greg Calbi – mastering at Sterling Sound (New York, NY)
- Lynn Kowalewski – art direction
- Jo Ann Callis – photography
