= Devil in Me =

Studio album by Natalie Duncan
- Released: 16 July 2012
- Recorded: 2011
- Genre: Blues; soul; jazz; classical
- Length: 64:18 (standard edition); 75:59 (deluxe edition)
- Label: Verve
- Producer: Joe Henry

Natalie Duncan chronology
Live in Real World Studios (2012)	Devil in Me (2012)	Find Me a Home (2012)

Singles from Devil in Me
- 1. "Sky Is Falling" Released: 30 March 2012; 2. "Find Me a Home" Released: 14 September 2012

Devil in Me is the debut studio album by British singer and songwriter Natalie Duncan. It was released by Verve Records on 16 July 2012. The album explores a vast range of music genres including soul, jazz, blues and classical. Duncan has stated influences on the album as being Nina Simone, Alicia Keys, Pink Floyd and others.

Professional ratings
Review scores
Source	Rating
Daily Express	4/5 stars

== History ==
Recording sessions for the album began in 2011. The album was recorded in its entirety at Peter Gabriel's Real World Studios in Box, Wiltshire, England. The album was produced by Joe Henry.

== Track listing ==
No.	Title	Writer(s)	Producer(s)	Length
1.	"Devil in Me"	Natalie Duncan	Joe Henry	4:53
2.	"Keep Her Smiling"	Duncan	Henry	3:49
3.	"Songbird"	Duncan	Henry	4:56
4.	"Sky Is Falling"	Duncan	Henry	4:19
5.	"Old Rock"	Duncan	Henry	6:40
6.	"Lonely Child"	Duncan	Henry	3:48
7.	"Pick Me Up Bar"	Duncan	Duncan	5:05
8.	"Find Me a Home"	Duncan; Jimmy Hogarth	Henry	5:22
9.	"Flower"	Duncan	Henry	5:31
10.	"She Done Died"	Duncan	Henry	3:51
11.	"Villain Hands"	Duncan	Henry	4:37
12.	"Black Thorn"	Duncan	Henry	3:57
13.	"Uncomfortable Silence"	Duncan	Henry	6:14
14.	"Became So Sweet"	Duncan	Duncan	4:36
Total length:				64:18

iTunes Store bonus track
No.	Title	Length
15.	"Born In My Skin"	4:10
16.	"Brother Forgive Me"	3:55
17.	"End"	4:07
Total length:		75:59

Japanese bonus track
No.	Title	Length
15.	"Grace"	4:12
16.	"Been Alone Too Long"	2:41
17.	"At Last (Autotrader version)"	3:02
18.	"Born In My Skin"	4:10
Total length:		78:23

== Singles ==
1. "Sky Is Falling"
2. "Find Me a Home"

== Personnel ==
- All tracks produced by Joe Henry (except tracks 7 and 14, produced by Duncan).
- All tracks mixed by Stampede Origin, Los Angeles, CA. Mastered at Lurssen Master by Gavin Lurssen in Los Angeles, CA (except tracks 7 and 14).
- Tracks 7 and 14 were recorded at The Engine Room, London.
- Recording engineer is Patrick Phillips (except tracks 7, 13 and 14).
- Assistant recording engineer is Jose Gomes (except tracks 7, 13 and 14).
- Recording engineer and mixer (tracks 7 and 14) is Mark Bishop.

All tracks:

- Vocal and piano – Natalie Duncan

All tracks (except 7 and 14):

- Acoustic and electric guitar – John Smith
- Electric guitar – Patrick Warren
- Upright and bass guitar – Greg Cohen
- Drums and percussion – Earl Harvin
- Backing vocals – Hattie Whitehead

Tracks 7 and 14:

- Drums – Glyn Daniels
- Guitar – Tom Varrall
- Double bass – Henry Guy
- Backing vocals – Hattie Whitehead

Additional tracks:

- Electric guitar – Tom Varrall (tracks 4, 6, 7, 8, 11 and 14)
- Backing vocals – Tom Varrall (track 6)
- Trombone – Lucy Wilkins (track 8)
- String section (tracks 2, 6, 8 and 9):
- First violin and section leader – Lucy Wilkins
- Violin – Howard Gott
- Viola – Rachel Robson
- Cello – Sarah Willson
- Trombone and euphonium – Mike Kearsey
- Strings and horns arranged by Patrick Warren
