= The Milk Carton Kids =

American musical group

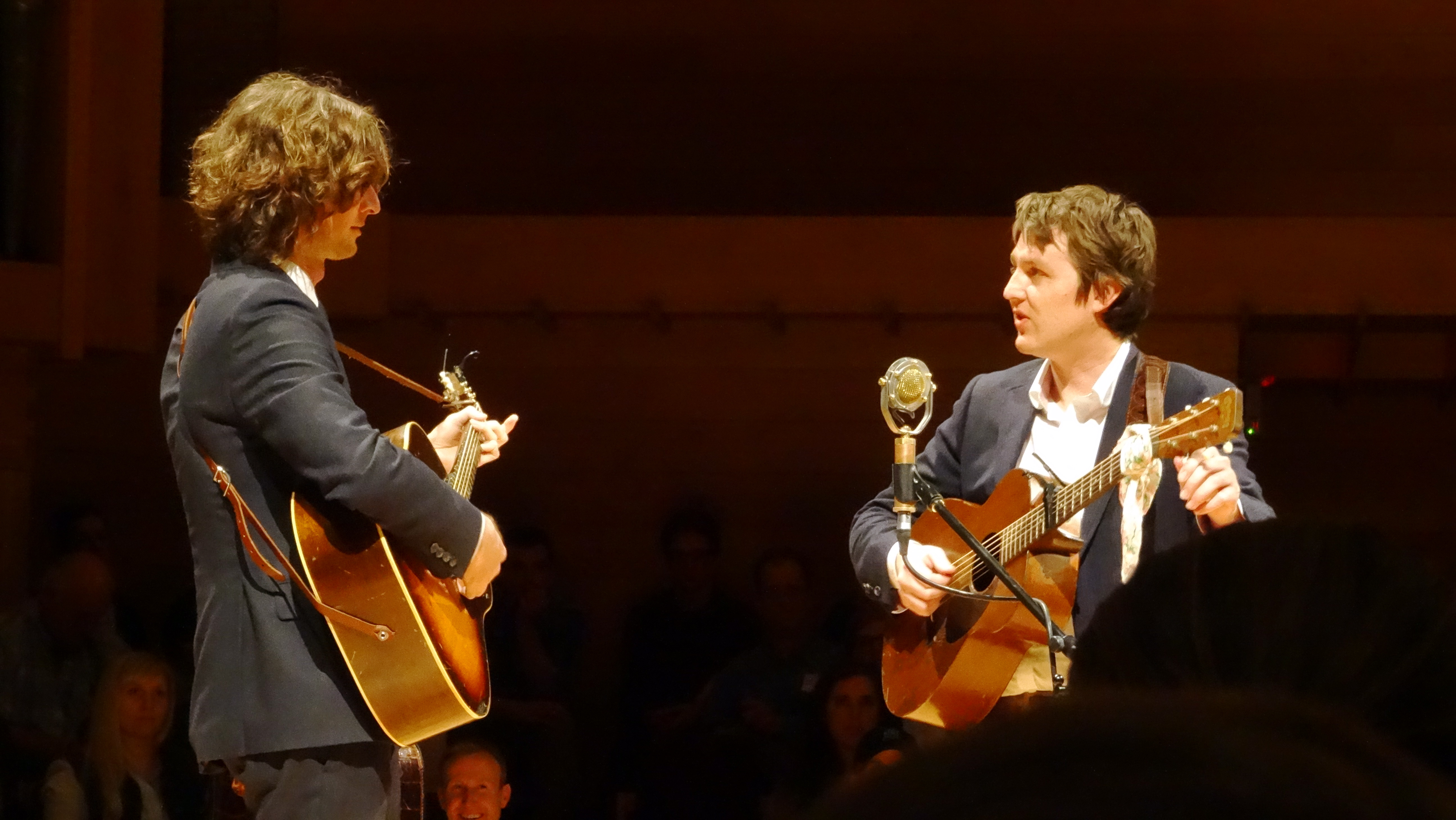
- At Calvin University, Grand Rapids, Michigan, May 7, 2014

Background information
- Origin: Los Angeles, California, U.S.
- Genres: Folk, Americana
- Instrument: acoustic guitar
- Years active: 2011–present
- Label: ANTI-
- Members: Kenneth Pattengale; Joey Ryan
- Website: themilkcartonkids.com

The Milk Carton Kids are an American indie folk duo consisting of singer-guitarists Kenneth Pattengale and Joey Ryan. The duo hails from Eagle Rock, Los Angeles. They began making music together in early 2011 and have recorded and released six albums. Their first two albums were released free of charge online. They were featured on the Peacock TV show Girls5Eva with their song, New York Lonely Boy. Their instrumental and vocal style has been likened to that of Simon and Garfunkel.

== Biography ==
Joey Ryan and Kenneth Pattengale came together as a musical duo after Ryan attended a solo performance by Pattengale in Eagle Rock. Both artists had had largely unsuccessful solo careers up to this point and had reached a professional crossroads.

They released Retrospect, a live album recorded at Zoey's Cafe in Ventura, California, in March 2011. Retrospect predated the band name and was released as Kenneth Pattengale & Joey Ryan. After performing at SXSW in March 2011, the newly-named Milk Carton Kids joined Joe Purdy's North American tour as his opening act and backing band.

== Albums ==
The duo released Prologue on July 19, 2011, their first studio album and the first release under their group name. The San Francisco Chronicle described Prologue as "bittersweet and beautiful." Following Prologue’s release, the duo headlined a North American tour. "There By Your Side" from the album was named National Public Radio's Song of the Day. Prologue made Daytrotter, American Songwriter, and About.com year-end lists.

Their second album, The Ash & Clay, was released on ANTI- records on March 26, 2013. Promotion for the album included a tour with Austin-based artist Sarah Jarosz, and a November taping of Austin City Limits.

The next album, Monterey, was released on May 19, 2015 on ANTI- records. It was well-reviewed, with Rolling Stone calling it a "beautifully realised folk recording," and Paste calling the album, "exquisite."

All the Things That I Did and All the Things That I Didn't Do was released on June 29, 2018 on Anti- Records. Rolling Stone praised the album, and writer Luke Levenson noted that the bandmates' life changes had been significant influences on its sound, commenting that "both halves of the troubadour twosome have undergone serious life changes, with Joey Ryan fathering his second child, and Kenneth Pattengale overcoming cancer and the breakup of a seven-year relationship."

Their fifth album, The Only Ones, was released on October 18, 2019, and was marketed and distributed by Thirty Tigers. It was relatively short for a studio album, at 25 minutes 33 seconds. This led the band to quip at live performances that they had intended to release an EP, but added two extra songs.

I Only See the Moon was released on May 19, 2023. Banjo, played by Ryan, was added to several songs. A tour of the US was undertaken to support the album.

== Appearances and performances ==
The Milk Carton Kids have performed on National Public Radio's Mountain Stage, Daytrotter, and were guest DJ hosts on Sirius/XM's folk channel The Village. The duo toured in July/August 2012 with Old Crow Medicine Show and The Lumineers; tour venues included Louisville, Cincinnati, Nashville, Richmond, Washington, D.C., Philadelphia, New York City, Boston, and Atlanta. In the fall of 2012, they toured America again with L.A.-based Leslie Stevens opening, and in November 2012 they began a tour with the Punch Brothers. In December 2012, three unreleased tracks, "Snake Eyes", "The Ash & Clay" and "Jewel of June", were featured in Gus Van Sant's film Promised Land.

The duo also featured in T Bone Burnett & The Coen Brothers' concert film documentary, Another Day/Another Time: Celebrating the Music of Inside Llewyn Davis, alongside Joan Baez, Jack White, Gillian Welch, Marcus Mumford, Punch Brothers and other folk luminaries.

After the release of The Ash & Clay in 2013, they appeared in TV and radio shows which included Garrison Keillor's A Prairie Home Companion, CBS This Morning, and Conan.

On April 29, 2014 National Public Radio released a full concert DVD of the duo, Live at Lincoln Theatre. On April 11 &12, 2014, they collaborated with Joe Henry and Over the Rhine for a two-night live performance and recording of new songs inspired by the Great American Songbook. An album of the collaboration is expected .

In October 2016, the duo joined the Lampedusa concert tour in the US in support of equal human rights for refugees.

== Instruments ==
Ryan plays a 1951 Gibson J-45 acoustic guitar. Pattengale performs on a 1954 Martin 0-15.

== Awards, honors, distinctions ==
The group has been nominated four times for a Grammy Award. Their albums The Ash & Clay (2013) and I Only See the Moon (2023) both received nominations for Best Folk Album, the song City of Our Lady from their 2015 album Monterey received a nomination for Best American Roots Performance, and their 2018 album All the Things That I Did and All the Things that I Didn't Do was nominated for Best Engineered Album, Non-Classical.

The duo also received a nomination for Best Emerging Artist of the Year at the 2013 Americana Music Honors & Awards.

In 2014 they were nominated the Americana Music Association Duo/Group of the Year.

Both Prologue and Retrospect were made available for free download at the group's website. By the end of 2011, the two albums had been downloaded for free over 60,000 times. By February 2014 downloads had reached 275,000.

== Discography ==
1. Retrospect (2011)
  1. "Permanent" (5:10)
  2. "Laredo" (5:57)
  3. "Broken Headlights" (3:20)
  4. "Charlie" (4:01)
  5. "Maybe It's Time" (4:27)
  6. "Trouble in These Parts" (4:22)
  7. "Girls, Gather 'Round" (4:54)
  8. "As It Must Be" (4:38)
  9. "Memoirs of an Owned Dog" (4:08)
  10. "Queen Jane" (3:56)
  11. "Rock & Roll 'Er" (5:04)
  12. "Lake Skaneateles" (3:54)
  13. "California" (4:43)
  14. "Like A Cloak" (5:14)
2. Prologue (2011)
  1. "Michigan" (5:31)
  2. "Undress the World" (3:17)
  3. "Milk Carton Kid" (4:05)
  4. "One Goodbye" (3:13)
  5. "No Hammer to Hold" (3:13)
  6. "There By Your Side" (4:05)
  7. "New York" (3:33)
  8. "Stealing Romance" (2:50)
  9. "I Still Want a Little More" (3:12)
3. The Ash & Clay (2013)
  1. "Hope of a Lifetime"
  2. "Snake Eyes"
  3. "Honey, Honey"
  4. "Years Gone By"
  5. "The Ash & Clay"
  6. "Promised Land"
  7. "The Jewel of June"
  8. "Whisper in Her Ear"
  9. "On the Mend"
  10. "Heaven"
  11. "Hear Them Loud"
  12. "Memphis"
4. NPR's Live From Lincoln Theatre (2014)
5. Monterey (2015)
  1. "Asheville Skies"
  2. "Getaway"
  3. "Monterey"
  4. "Secrets of the Stars"
  5. "Freedom"
  6. "High Hopes"
  7. "Deadly Bells"
  8. "Shooting Shadows"
  9. "The City of Our Lady"
  10. "Sing, Sparrow, Sing"
  11. "Poison Tree"
6. Wish You Were Here - Single (2015)
  1. "Wish You Were Here"
7. All the Things That I Did and All the Things That I Didn't Do (2018)
  1. "Just Look at Us Now"
  2. "Nothing Is Real"
  3. "Younger Years"
  4. "Mourning in America"
  5. "You Break My Heart"
  6. "Blindness"
  7. "One More for the Road"
  8. "Big Time"
  9. "A Sea of Roses"
  10. "Unwinnable War"
  11. "I've Been Loving You"
  12. "All the Things..."
8. The Only Ones (2019)
  1. "I Meant Every Word I Said"
  2. "I'll be Gone"
  3. "The Only Ones"
  4. "My Name is Ana"
  5. "As the Moon Starts to Rise"
  6. "About the Size of a Pixel"
  7. "I Was Alive"
9. I Only See the Moon (2023)
  1. "All of the Time in the World to Kill"
  2. "Star Shine"
  3. "When You're Gone"
  4. "Wheels and Levers"
  5. "I Only See the Moon"
  6. "Running on Sweet Smile"
  7. "One True Love"
  8. "Body & Soul"
  9. "North Country Ride"
  10. "Will You Remember Me?"
10. Lost Cause Lover Fool (2026)
  1. "Blue Water"
  2. "My Place Among the Stones"
  3. "A Friend Like You"
  4. "I'll Go home From Here"
  5. "Lost Cause Lover Fool"
  6. "Blinded and Smiling"
  7. "Sad Song"
  8. "Ribbon"
  9. "Young Love"
