= Ryan Freeland =

American songwriter

- Born: Ryan Freeland
- Genres: Folk; Americana; blues; jazz; gospel
- Occupations: Record producer; songwriter; mixer; engineer
- Instrument: Piano
- Website: ryanfreeland.com

Ryan Freeland is an American record producer, songwriter, engineer, and mixer based in Los Angeles. Freeland is a five-time Grammy Award winner and is best known for his work with Bonnie Raitt, Ray LaMontagne, Aimee Mann, Joe Henry, Grant-Lee Phillips, Hugh Laurie, Ingrid Michaelson, Loudon Wainwright III, Rodney Crowell, Alana Davis, and Jonatha Brooke. He is represented exclusively by Global Positioning Services Management in Santa Monica.

== Life and career ==
=== Personal life ===
Freeland began playing the piano at age 6 from the encouragement of his mother, and continued studying classical and jazz piano at Interlochen Arts Academy. He later attended California State University, Chico where he completed a bachelor's degree in music with a minor in English.

=== Work with Bob Clearmountain ===
After working for six months at Kiva Recording Studio in Memphis, Freeland heard that the esteemed producer, engineer and mixer Bob Clearmountain was looking for an assistant engineer at his new private studio in Pacific Palisades. He decided to cold call Clearmountain and ended up getting the position. Freeland describes it as “a life-changing event” and from 1994 to 1998 he was Clearmountain's second engineer.

He then moved on to become an independent engineer, and some of his first projects included Aimee Mann and Jonathan Brooke, whom he had met by working with Bob Clearmountain. He has since worked for 20 years as an independent producer, engineer and mixer.

== Stampede Origin Studios ==
Freeland works from his custom-built two story studio “Stampede Origin Studio” in Culver City, CA. The facility features a large live room, two isolation booths and amplifier closets, while the second floor hosts the main control room, listening area, a kitchenette and a third isolation booth often used for vocals. Five full-racks house most of his outboard gear, and the studio is home to a large collection of new and vintage microphones and instruments.

== Grammy Awards ==
Freeland is a five-time Grammy award winner and has won awards for the following albums:

- 2009: Ramblin' Jack Elliott - “A Stranger Here”, Best Traditional Blues Album (Engineer, Mixer)
- 2010: The Carolina Chocolate Drops - “Genuine Negro Jig”, Best Traditional Folk Album (Engineer, Mixer)
- 2010: Ray LaMontagne - “God Willin' and the Creek Don't Rise”, Best Contemporary Folk Album (Engineer, Mixer)
- 2012: Bonnie Raitt - “Slipstream”, Best Americana Album (Engineer, Mixer)
- 2018: Aimee Mann - "Mental Illness", Best Folk Album (Engineer, Mixer)

== Selected discography ==
Artist	Year	Album	Engineer	Mixer
Noam Weinstein	2020	42 1/2	check	check
Morrissey	2019	California Son	check	check
Joan Baez	2018	Whistle Down the Wind	check	check
Aimee Mann	2018	Mental Illness	check	check
The Milk Carton Kids	2018	All The Things That I Did...	check	check
Lizz Wright	2017	Grace	check	check
Chely Wright	2016	I Am the Rain	check	check
Billy Bragg & Joe Henry	2016	Shine a Light: Field Recordings from the Great American Railroad	check	check
Bonnie Raitt	2016	Dig In Deep	check	check
Hayes Carll	2016	Lovers and Leavers	check	check
Allen Toussaint	2016	American Tunes	check	check
Birds of Chicago	2016	Real Midnight	check	check
Wynonna Judd	2016	Wynonna & the Big Noise	check	check
Justin Townes Earle	2015	Absent Fathers		check
Bettye LaVette	2015	Worthy	check	check
The Barr Brothers	2014	Sleeping Operator	check	check
Hugh Laurie	2013	Didn't It Rain	check	check
The Milk Carton Kids	2013	The Ash and Clay	check	check
Ray LaMontagne & the Pariah Dogs	2010	God Willin' & the Creek Don't Rise	check	check
Carolina Chocolate Drops	2009	Genuine Negro Jig	check	check
Joe Henry	2009	Blood from Stars	check	check
Ramblin' Jack Elliot	2009	A Stranger Here	check	check
Aimee Mann	2005	The Forgotten Arm	check	check
