= Joe Henry =

American musician (born 1960)

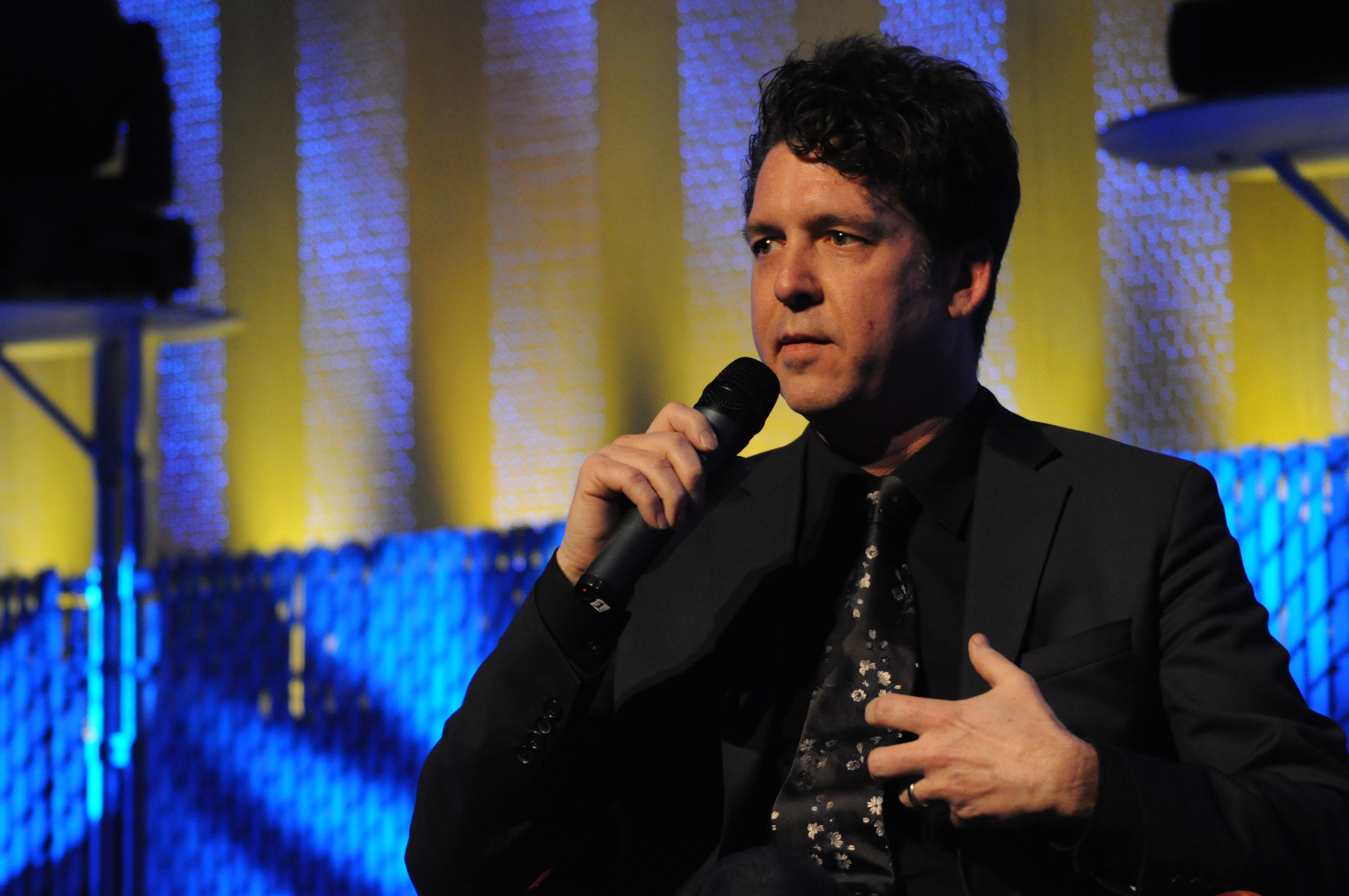
- Henry at the 2010 Pop Conference

Background information
- Born: Joseph Lee Henry; December 2, 1960 (age 65); Charlotte, North Carolina, U.S.
- Genres: Alternative Country, Americana, Country Folk
- Occupations: Singer-songwriter, musician, record producer
- Instruments: Vocals, guitar
- Years active: 1986–present
- Labels: Profile, Mammoth, ANTI-
- Spouse: Melanie Ciccone (m. 1987)
- Website: joehenrylovesyoumadly.com

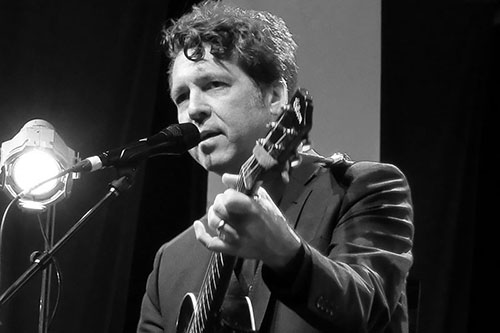
Henry at Aarhus Festival 2015

Joseph Lee Henry (born December 2, 1960) is an American singer-songwriter, guitarist, and producer. He has released 15 studio albums which are broadly classified as alternative country but often eclectic and showing influences from other genres. Henry has produced multiple recordings for other artists, including three Grammy Award-winning albums by artists in blues, folk or R&B.

== Early life ==
Henry was born in Charlotte, North Carolina, the state where his parents, whom he described as devout Christians, were also from. He grew up in Oakland Township, Michigan, and attended Rochester Community Schools. He graduated from Rochester Adams High School, then graduated from the University of Michigan.

== Career ==
=== 1985 to 2005 ===
Henry moved to Brooklyn, New York in 1985 and began performing in local music venues. He released his first album Talk of Heaven in 1986. The album earned him a recording contract with A&M, which subsequently released the albums Murder of Crows (on which Mick Taylor played lead guitar) in 1989 and Shuffletown in 1990. Shuffletown, produced by T Bone Burnett, represented a shift in musical direction towards the "alt country" genre. Henry's next two recordings, Short Man's Room (1992) and Kindness of the World (1993), featured members of the country-rock band the Jayhawks. The song "King's Highway" was recorded by Joan Baez in 2003 and Gov't Mule in 2005. For his 1996 album Trampoline, Henry incorporated guitarist Page Hamilton of Helmet and a reviewer at Trouserpress called the album "idiosyncratic broadmindedness."

1999's Fuse was recorded with producers Daniel Lanois and T Bone Burnett. The album was called an "atmospheric marvel" by one reviewer and Ann Powers of The New York Times wrote: Henry has "found the sound that completes his verbal approach."

Scar, released in 2001, featured jazz musicians Marc Ribot, Brian Blade, Brad Mehldau and saxophonist Ornette Coleman on "Richard Pryor Addresses a Tearful Nation." According to AllMusic's Thom Jurek, the album is a "triumph not only for Henry—who has set a new watermark for himself—but for American popular music, which so desperately needed something else to make it sing again."

2003's self-produced Tiny Voices album was Henry's first recording on Epitaph's Anti- label. AllMusic's Jurek described this album as "the sound of....electric guitars in an abandoned yet fully furnished Tiki bar in Raymond Chandler's Los Angeles."

Henry's wife talked him into letting her send Madonna, who is her sister, a demo of his song "Stop," which was reworked and recorded as "Don't Tell Me" (from Madonna's 2000 album Music). Henry's own tango-tinged version of the song appeared on Scar and was featured in an episode of The Sopranos. Henry and his sister-in-law recorded a duet, "Guilty by Association," on the charity album Sweet Relief II: Gravity of the Situation, and collaborated on the songs "Jump" on Confessions on a Dance Floor, "Devil Wouldn't Recognize You" on Hard Candy, and "Falling Free" on MDNA.

In the early 2000s, Henry was an inaugural member of the Independent Music Awards' judging panel to support independent artists.

=== 2006 to present ===
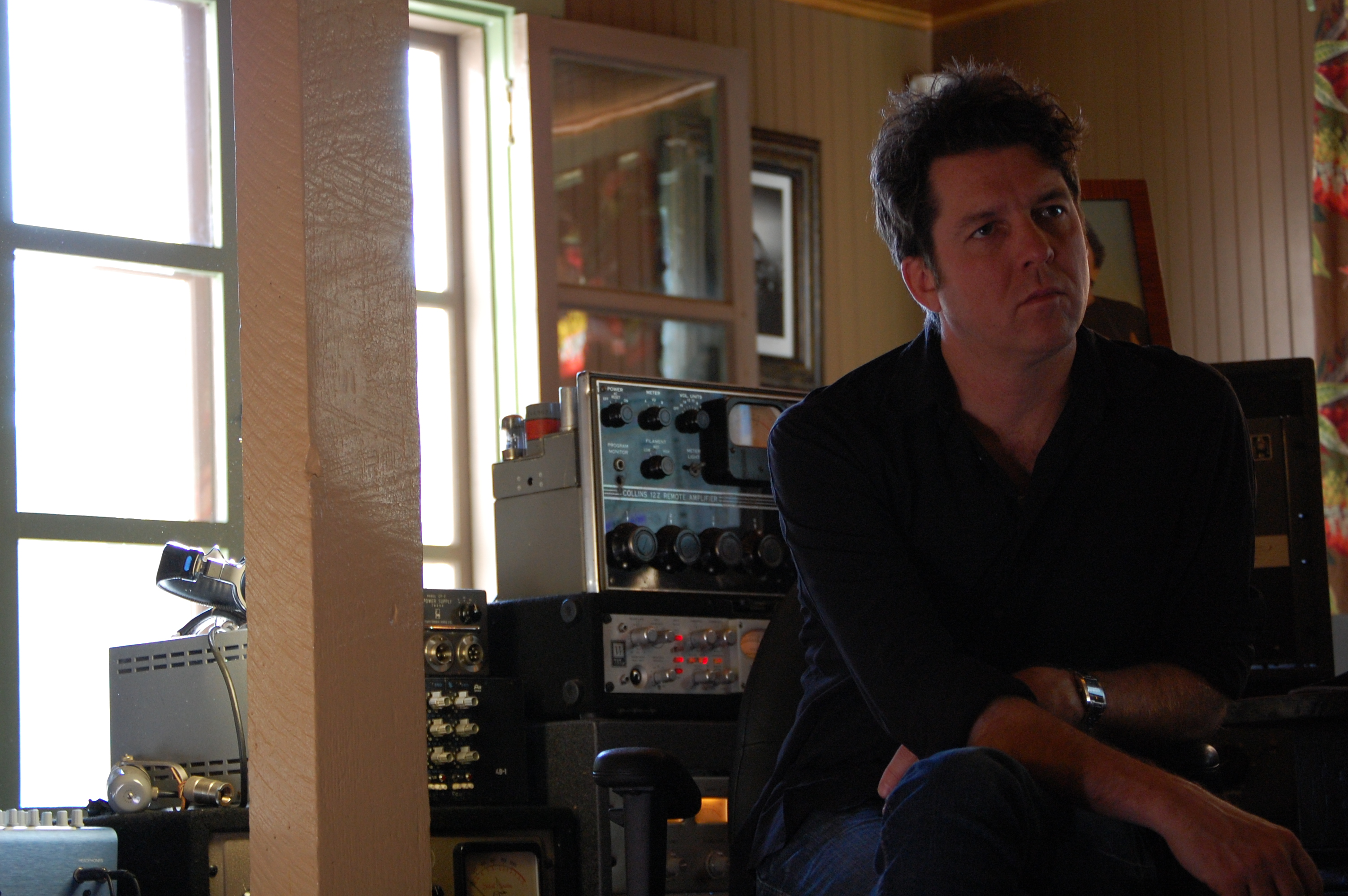
Joe Henry at The Garfield House, 2009

After producing the Grammy-award-winning album Don't Give Up on Me by Solomon Burke, Henry produced additional records and in 2006 opened up a home studio where he often collaborates with recording engineer Ryan Freeland and Los Angeles-based musicians such as Jay Bellerose, Greg Leisz, David Piltch, Patrick Warren and Keefus Ciancia. In September 2006, Henry and Loudon Wainwright III began composing the music for the Judd Apatow movie Knocked Up in Henry's home studio. Some instrumentals were used as background score for the film while other songs appeared on Wainwright's 2007 Strange Weirdos which Henry produced.

In 2007, Henry released Civilians, which was described as "a rich, acoustic affair that returns us to Henry's rootsier sounds". The final track on the album, "God Only Knows," was used in a "TCM Remembers 2008" TV commercial. Bonnie Raitt's 2012 album Slipstream, which Henry produced, contained versions of two songs from Civilians.

In 2009, Henry released his ninth solo record, Blood from Stars which incorporates orchestral blues with guitarist Marc Ribot, pianist Jason Moran and his son, Levon Henry, on saxophone. The album focuses on facets of blues with a sprinkling of jazz, rock and pop and traces the rugged history of American storytelling."

In May 2011, Henry released the album Reverie with simple acoustic instrumentation on guitar, upright bass, piano and drums. "When you listen to Reverie, especially on headphones, you can hear traffic in the background or a neighbor calling her dog. It's not always a pristine recording environment. Henry not only left the windows open at his basement studio, but also put microphones on them." "But there was this singer-songwriter environment, this post-Dylan fallout, of people who think that pages of your diary set to music are songs, and that the more 'honest' songs are, the better they are. And that's the greatest misconception of American popular music: that if you're being honest, you're being entertaining."

In June 2014, Henry released his thirteenth album, Invisible Hour. It was recorded at his LA home studio, The Garfield House, in 2013 with his regular band of musicians (Jay Bellerose, Jennifer Condos, Levon Henry, Greg Leisz, John Smith, and David Piltch). Guests providing backing vocals on the album included The Milk Carton Kids and Lisa Hannigan. Paste magazine described it as "11 impossibly beautiful songs" and "Joe Henry's masterpiece".

In October 2017, Henry released Thrum.

In June 2019, Henry recorded what was intended to be demos of 13 new songs. Those demos became his 15th studio album, "The Gospel According To Water", which was released on November 15, 2019.

Henry was honored with a Lifetime Achievement Award at the 2025 Americana Music Honors & Awards on September 10, 2025.

== Reception ==
Henry has been described as "a modest-selling 'critic's darling' with a reputation for pushing the envelope" and who writes "songs [that] don't fit into an easily defined box" and instead is influenced by folk, blues, jazz, rock and country.

== Personal life ==
Henry married Melanie Ciccone in 1987. They have two children. Melanie is the sister of Madonna.

In 2013, Henry and his brother David released a biography of Richard Pryor, titled Furious Cool: Richard Pryor and the World That Made Him.

Joe Henry and his family moved out of their home (and his long-time recording space), The Garfield House, in early 2015.

In May 2019 Joe Henry revealed that a few months earlier he was diagnosed with stage four prostate cancer. He further advised that he has responded well to the treatment he has received, and that his prognosis for now is very encouraging.

== Discography ==
=== Studio albums ===
- Talk of Heaven (1986)
- Murder of Crows (1989)
- Shuffletown (1990)
- Short Man's Room (1992)
- Kindness of the World (1993)
- Trampoline (1996)
- Fuse (1999)
- Scar (2001)
- Tiny Voices (2003)
- Civilians (2007)
- Blood from Stars (2009)
- Reverie (2011)
- Invisible Hour (2014)
- Thrum (2017)
- The Gospel According to Water (2019)
- All the Eye Can See (2022)
- Blood from Stars (Expanded & Remastered) (2024)

=== Live albums ===
- Shine a Light: Field Recordings from the Great American Railroad (with Billy Bragg) (2016)

=== EPs ===
- Fireman's Wedding (1994)

=== Production credits ===
- Strange Angels by Kristin Hersh (co-producer, 1998)
- I Oughtta Give You a Shot in the Head for Making Me Live in This Dump by Shivaree (co-producer, 1999)
- Teddy Thompson by Teddy Thompson (co-producer, 2000)
- Dim Stars, Bright Sky by John Doe (co-producer, 2002)
- Don't Give Up on Me by Solomon Burke (producer, 2002)
- Drill a Hole in That Substrate and Tell Me What You See by Jim White (co-producer, 2004)
- Knuckle Down by Ani DiFranco (co-producer, 2005)
- The Forgotten Arm by Aimee Mann (producer, 2005)
- Hope and Desire by Susan Tedeschi (producer, 2005)
- I've Got My Own Hell to Raise by Bettye LaVette (producer, 2005)
- I Believe to My Soul by various artists (producer, 2005)
- Our New Orleans: A Benefit Album for the Gulf Coast by various artists (co-producer, 2005)
- The River in Reverse by Elvis Costello and Allen Toussaint (producer, 2006)
- Between Daylight and Dark by Mary Gauthier (producer, 2007)
- Strange Weirdos by Loudon Wainwright III (co-producer, 2007)
- Sex & Gasoline by Rodney Crowell (producer, 2008)
- Recovery by Loudon Wainwright III (producer, 2008)
- The Bright Mississippi by Allen Toussaint (producer, 2009)
- La Différence by Salif Keita (producer, 2009)
- A Stranger Here by Ramblin' Jack Elliott (producer, 2009)
- Genuine Negro Jig by Carolina Chocolate Drops (producer, 2009)
- The Way of the World by Mose Allison (producer, 2010)
- I Know I've Been Changed by Aaron Neville (producer, 2010)
- The Long Surrender by Over the Rhine (producer, 2011)
- Let Them Talk by Hugh Laurie (producer, 2011)
- Passenger by Lisa Hannigan (producer, 2011)
- Weather by Meshell Ndegeocello (co-producer, 2011)
- Slipstream by Bonnie Raitt (co-producer, 2012)
- Kin: Songs by Mary Karr & Rodney Crowell by various artists (producer, 2012)
- Devil In Me by Natalie Duncan (producer, 2012)
- Tooth & Nail by Billy Bragg (producer, 2013)
- Didn't It Rain by Hugh Laurie (producer, 2013)
- Meet Me at the Edge of the World by Over the Rhine (producer, 2013)
- The Wexford Carols by Caitríona O'Leary (producer, 2014)
- Worthy by Bettye LaVette (co-producer, 2015)
- Dig In Deep by Bonnie Raitt (co-producer, 2016)
- American Tunes by Allen Toussaint (producer, 2016)
- Dorado by Son of the Velvet Rat (producer, 2016)
- Real Midnight by Birds of Chicago (producer, 2016)
- Lovers and Leavers by Hayes Carll (producer, 2016)
- I Am the Rain by Chely Wright (producer, 2016)
- Whistle Down the Wind by Joan Baez (producer, 2018)
- The Nomad by Guy Pearce (producer, 2018)
- All the Things That I Did and All the Things That I Didn't Do by The Milk Carton Kids (producer, 2018)
- There Is No Other by Rhiannon Giddens (producer, 2019)
- Speak to Me by Julian Lage (producer, 2024)
- The Living Kind by John Smith (folk musician) (producer, 2024)
- “Scenes From Above” by Julian Lage (producer, 2026)
- Between Heaven and Earth by Alicia Witt, (producer, 2026)

=== Songwriting credits ===
- "Don't Tell Me" by Madonna (co-writer, 2000; based on his song "Stop")
- "Hope Against Hope" by Rosanne Cash (co-writer, 2003)
- "Jump" by Madonna (co-writer, 2005)
- "Devil Wouldn't Recognize You" by Madonna (co-writer, 2008)
- "Love and Treachery" by Madeleine Peyroux (co-writer, 2009)
- "Falling Free" by Madonna (co-writer, 2012)
- "At the Heart of Me" by Chely Wright (co-writer, 2016)
- "Holy War" by Chely Wright (co-writer, 2016)
- "See Me Home" by Chely Wright (co-writer, 2016)
