= Greatest Hits: Postcards from East Oceanside =

Greatest hits album by Paula Cole
- Released: June 6, 2006
- Recorded: 1994–2006
- Genre: Rock
- Length: 77:34
- Labels: Warner Bros.; Rhino
- Producer: Paula Cole

Paula Cole chronology
Amen (1999)	Greatest Hits: Postcards from East Oceanside (2006)	Courage (2007)

Professional ratings
Review scores
Source	Rating
Allmusic	4/5 stars

Greatest Hits: Postcards from East Oceanside is Paula Cole's first compilation album. It also includes two new tracks, "Tomorrow I Will Be Yours" and "Postcards from East Oceanside".

== Track listing ==
1. "I Am So Ordinary"
2. "Me"
3. "I Believe in Love"
4. "Where Have All the Cowboys Gone?"
5. "Amen"
6. "Feelin' Love"
7. "I Don't Want to Wait"
8. "God Is Watching"
9. "Carmen"
10. "Happy Home"
11. "Autumn Leaves"
12. "Saturn Girl"
13. "Hush, Hush, Hush" (featuring Peter Gabriel)
14. "Bethlehem"
15. "Tomorrow I Will Be Yours"
16. "Postcards from East Oceanside"
