= Ithaca (Paula Cole album) =

Studio album by Paula Cole
- Released: September 21, 2010
- Recorded: February–April, 2010
- Studio: Avatar, New York City; NuNoise, New York City; Wittman, New York City
- Genre: Rock
- Length: 48:30
- Label: Decca
- Producer: Paula Cole, Chris Roberts, Kevin Killen

Paula Cole chronology
Courage (2007)	Ithaca (2010)	Raven (2013)

Singles from Ithaca
- 1. "Music in Me" Released: August 24, 2010

Ithaca is the fifth studio album by American singer/songwriter Paula Cole. This was released internationally on 21 September 2010 on Decca Records. It was tracked between February until the end of April 2010.

It is the first album entirely written by Cole (apart from "Somethin' I've Gotta Say" which was co-written with Kevin Barry) since 1999's Amen. The album was produced by Paula Cole and Chris Roberts. Kevin Killen (who produced Cole's debut record Harbinger and parts of her second album This Fire) co-produced.

“The overall theme of Ithaca is the return to home and making peace with it,” Cole says. “It's about accepting that I actually want to be with a man who is a lot like my father and that I am a lot like my mother—which I’ve written about in ‘Music In Me.’ I rebelled against these classical complexes and got really beat up in the world. So I’ve come to a quiet place of acceptance in my family and my hometown. That's why I called the album ‘Ithaca,’ which is the island Odysseus came home to in The Odyssey after 10 years of fighting and 10 years of trying to get back home. Rockport is my Ithaca, and coming home has been an Odyssean journey: enduring war and finding beautiful things in home. That's the tone of the album, that there is both darkness and light to this story. My journey has healed me, and in that healing process I’ve been able to work again.”

== Background ==
Following the commercial disappointment of her 1999 album Amen, Cole parted ways with Warner Bros. Records disillusioned by the music industry and the pressure from label executives to sell records. Without a record deal, Cole decided to take time off and focus on raising her young daughter Sky. “I needed to get off the giant hamster wheel,” Cole says of her music career. “I wanted to find some other meaning to my life and it seemed impossible to combine motherhood with the music business. It was like being at a spiritual stop sign in the road. That's what inspired ‘Somethin’ I’ve Gotta Say,’ one of the older songs on the album. I thought I was done with the music career after having Sky.”

Several years later, Cole was lured back to record-making by a friend, Blood, Sweat & Tears’ drummer Bobby Colomby, who produced her intimate, jazz-influenced collection Courage, which she released in 2007 while going through a difficult divorce. After the split was finalised in 2008, Cole moved back to her hometown of Rockport, Massachusetts to write what became Ithaca.

== Critical reception ==
Professional ratings
Review scores
Source	Rating
Allmusic	3.5/5 stars

Allmusic praised Ithaca's emotionally raw, '90s sound, stating that it allowed Cole to work out her troubles while becoming reacquainted with the listener, taking them on a journey of pain and her ultimate rebirth. The album has consistently been compared to Cole's Harbinger and This Fire records.

== Promotion ==
In support of Ithaca, Cole embarked on a small promotion tour which took her across the United States throughout October, November and December 2010.

== Track listing ==
Ithaca track listing
No.	Title	Writer(s)	Length
1.	"The Hard Way"	Paula Cole	6:05
2.	"Waiting on a Miracle"	Paula Cole	5:03
3.	"Music in Me"	Paula Cole	4:02
4.	"Elegy"	Paula Cole	4:50
5.	"Come on Inside"	Paula Cole	4:54
6.	"P.R.E.N.U.P."	Paula Cole	2:52
7.	"Violet Eyes"	Paula Cole	4:37
8.	"Somethin' I’ve Gotta Say"	Paula Cole, Kevin Barry	4:26
9.	"Sex"	Paula Cole	8:10
10.	"2 Lifetimes"	Paula Cole	3:24

iTunes bonus track
No.	Title	Writer(s)	Length
11.	"Zinnias and Dahlias"	Paula Cole	4:08

Amazon.com bonus track
No.	Title	Length
11.	"Second Chance"	4:08

Tour Edition bonus track
No.	Title	Length
11.	"Gypsy Road"	5:16

== Personnel ==
- Paula Cole – vocals, piano, Wurlitzer, rhodes, clarinet
- Ben Wittman – drums, programming
- Ben Bulter – electric guitar, acoustic guitar,
- Jon Ossman – bass guitar, sitar, esraj, acoustic bass guitar, backing vocalist
- Tony Levin – Chapman stick, upright bass
- Kevin Barry – acoustic and electric guitars, lap steel guitar, electric ambiance
- Marc Ribot – banjo, electric guitar
- Jeremy Lubbock – string quartet arrangement
- Lisa Kim – violin
- Sharon Yamada – violin
- Rebecca Young – viola
- Maria Kitsopolous – cello
- Evan Barker – copyist
- Sandy Park – contractor

=== Production ===
- Produced by Paula Cole and Chris Roberts
- Co-produced by Kevin Killen
- Engineered and mixed by Kevin Killen
- Additional engineering by Ben Wittman
- Mastered by Bob Ludwig, Gateway Mastering

=== Design ===
- A&R Administration by Evelyn Morgan and Amy Merxbauer
- A&R Coordination by Paul Altomari
- Creative Direction by Pat Barry
- Package Design by Denise Trotman
- Photography by Fabrizio Ferri
- Package Coordination by Tom Arndt
- Styling by Sarah Gore
- Hair by Rodney Groves
- Makeup by Kristen Gallegos
