= List of Dawson's Creek home video releases =

Sony Pictures Home Entertainment released all six seasons of Dawson’s Creek on DVD between 2003 and 2006. A standalone Region 1 DVD of the series finale which features an extended cut was released in 2003. The complete series was released in 2009 on DVD while Mill Creek Entertainment will release the Blu-ray version on December 6, 2022.

== DVD ==
Season	Episode Count	Region 1	Region 2	Region 4	Bonus Features
1	13	April 1, 2003	July 14, 2003	June 10, 2003	Audio commentaries from Kevin Williamson and Paul Stupin; Retrospective Featurette "Dawson's Creek: From Day one"; Season One Time Capsule
2	22	December 16, 2003	April 5, 2004	June 22, 2004	Audio commentaries
3	23	June 29, 2004	August 23, 2004	July 5, 2005	Audio commentaries with Executive Producer Paul Stupin and Kerr Smith; Weblink to Create your own Dawson's Creek Soundtrack; Interactive Tour of Capeside; Bonus Previews
4	23	October 5, 2004	January 17, 2005	November 16, 2005	Ultimate Dawson's Creek Trivia Game; Audio commentaries
5	23	May 3, 2005	May 30, 2005	March 21, 2006	N/A
6	23	April 4, 2006	January 30, 2006	December 5, 2006	Audio commentary with Kevin Williamson and Paul Stupin on the finale; Scrapbook
Series Finale	1	September 30, 2003			Exclusive never-before-seen extended cut of the final episode; Commentary by creator Kevin Williamson and executive producer Paul Stupin; Alternate ending to original pilot presentation with optional commentary; 3 alternate scenes to original pilot presentation with optional commentary
Complete Series	127	November 10, 2009	January 30, 2006	December 5, 2006; June 12, 2013 (Brazil)	Dawson's Creek One Time Capsule; Dawson's Creek: Day One; Audio Commentary on select episodes; Creek Daze: An interview with creator Kevin Williams (new); Final Exams: Dawson's Creek Trivia Game; Original Pilot Ending; Deleted Scenes; Bonus CD contains original music from the series

Note: Seasons 2-6 contain music alterations, due to copyright issues. The theme song has also been altered starting with Season 3.

== Blu-ray ==
Season	Episode Count	Region A	Region B	Region C	Bonus Features
Complete Series	127	December 6, 2022			

== Music ==
The theme song, "I Don't Want to Wait" was written and performed by Paula Cole. For the first season, international broadcasts used "Run Like Mad", performed by Jann Arden, but switched to Cole's song for the remainder of the run. The producers originally planned to use "Hand in My Pocket" by Alanis Morissette for the theme (it was, in fact, used in the original pilot) but she would not grant them permission and Cole's song was substituted. The show's final episode features a video montage made by Dawson which includes footage seen in the original credits sequence, and is soundtracked by "Hand in My Pocket". There were two soundtrack albums.

Because the producers failed to secure the rights when the shows were produced and did not wish to pay for them later, most of the songs that aired in the original broadcasts (and are used in the syndicated run) were replaced in the DVD edition of the show despite the show having a signature sound. Starting with season 3, "I Don't Want To Wait" (the series opening theme song) was also dropped from the DVD releases, to be replaced by Jann Arden's "Run Like Mad" (including Adam Field's piano version of Cole's song used in 5.04 "The Long Goodbye"); however, "I Don't Want To Wait" was still featured when played using non-English language, plus, none of the songs used in the finale were altered on the DVD (including "I Don't Want to Wait").

Due to these copyright issues, several scenes in episodes from the fifth and sixth seasons were altered or completely deleted. These scenes include performances from these episodes:

- "Jessie's Girl" by Feel Love Fury in 5.11 and 5.17 (deleted).
- "Son of a Preacher Man" by Busy Philipps in 5.11.
- "I Ran (So Far Away)" by Katie Holmes in 5.17 (deleted).
- "Girls Just Wanna Have Fun" by Busy Philipps in 6.05 (deleted).
