= 40th Annual Grammy Awards =

1998 US music awards ceremony

- Date: February 25, 1998
- Location: Radio City Music Hall, New York City
- Hosted by: Kelsey Grammer
- Most awards: Bob Dylan, Alison Krauss and R. Kelly (3)
- Most nominations: Babyface (8)

Television/radio coverage
- Network: CBS

The 40th Annual Grammy Awards were held on February 25, 1998, at Radio City Music Hall, New York City. They recognized accomplishments by musicians from the previous year.

== Performers ==
- Will Smith – Men In Black/Gettin' Jiggy Wit It
- Babyface, Stevie Wonder, and Hezekiah Walker & The Love Fellowship Choir - How Come, How Long
- R. Kelly – I Believe I Can Fly
- Fiona Apple – Criminal
- Fleetwood Mac – Rhiannon/Go Your Own Way/Don't Stop
- Celine Dion – My Heart Will Go On
- LeAnn Rimes – How Do I Live
- Lilith Fair Tribute: Paula Cole – Where Have All The Cowboys Gone, Shawn Colvin – Sunny Came Home & Sarah McLachlan – Building A Mystery
- Hanson – MMMBop
- Vince Gill – Pretty Little Adriana
- Tim McGraw & Faith Hill – It's Your Love
- Aretha Franklin – Nessun Dorma
  - Franklin stepped in on this opera song when Luciano Pavarotti took sick after the broadcast had started
- Aretha Franklin & the cast of Blues Brothers 2000 – Respect
- Erykah Badu & Wyclef Jean – On & On/Gone 'Till November
- Bob Dylan – Love Sick

== Presenters ==
- Chris Rock & Vanessa Williams – Best Rap Solo Performance
- Gloria Estefan & Dwight Yoakam – Best Female Country Vocal Performance
- Mike Myers & Jewel – Best R&B Album
- Erykah Badu & Wyclef Jean – Song of the Year; Presented the Trustees Award
- Missy Elliott & LL Cool J – Best Male R&B Vocal Performance; Presented Bo Diddley with the Lifetime Achievement Award
- Tim McGraw & Faith Hill – Best Male Country Vocal Performance
- Danny De Vito & Puff Daddy – Best Pop Collaboration with Vocals
- Deana Carter & Julio Iglesias – Best Pop Performance by a Duo or Group with Vocals; Presented the Mills Brothers with the Lifetime Achievement Award
- Aretha Franklin & Blues Brothers – Best New Artist
- Boyz II Men & Tara Lipinski – Best Pop Vocal Album
- Kelsey Grammer & Bette Midler – Record of the Year
- Usher, Sheryl Crow & John Fogerty – Album of the Year; Presented Roy Orbison with the Lifetime Achievement Award

== Award winners ==
Bob Dylan, Alison Krauss & Union Station, and R. Kelly were the main recipients with three awards each. Following R. Kelly's federal conviction of racketeering and violations of the Mann Act in New York on September 27, 2021, The Recording Academy declined to strip Kelly of his awards.

=== General ===
Album of the Year

- Time Out of Mind – Bob Dylan; Daniel Lanois, producer
- The Day – Babyface; Babyface, producer
- This Fire – Paula Cole; Paula Cole, producer
- Flaming Pie – Paul McCartney; Jeff Lynne, George Martin & Paul McCartney, producers
- OK Computer – Radiohead; Nigel Godrich & Radiohead, producers

Record of the Year

- "Sunny Came Home" – Shawn Colvin; John Leventhal, producer
- "Where Have All the Cowboys Gone?" – Paula Cole; Paula Cole, producer
- "Everyday Is a Winding Road" – Sheryl Crow; Sheryl Crow, producer
- "MMMBop" – Hanson; The Dust Brothers, producers
- "I Believe I Can Fly" – R. Kelly; R. Kelly, producer

Song of the Year

- "Sunny Came Home" – Shawn Colvin & John Leventhal, songwriters (Shawn Colvin)
- "Don't Speak" – Eric Stefani & Gwen Stefani, songwriters (No Doubt)
- "How Do I Live" – Diane Warren, songwriter (LeAnn Rimes & Trisha Yearwood)
- "I Believe I Can Fly" – R. Kelly, songwriter (R. Kelly)
- "Where Have All the Cowboys Gone?" – Paula Cole, songwriter (Paula Cole)

Best New Artist

- Paula Cole
- Fiona Apple
- Erykah Badu
- Puff Daddy
- Hanson

=== Pop ===
Best Female Pop Vocal Performance

- "Building a Mystery" – Sarah McLachlan
- "Butterfly" – Mariah Carey
- "Where Have All the Cowboys Gone?" – Paula Cole
- "Sunny Came Home" – Shawn Colvin
- "Foolish Games" – Jewel

Best Male Pop Vocal Performance

- "Candle in the Wind 1997" – Elton John
- "Every Time I Close My Eyes" – Babyface
- "Whenever Wherever Whatever" – Maxwell
- "Fly Like an Eagle" – Seal
- "Barely Breathing" – Duncan Sheik

Best Pop Performance by a Duo or Group with Vocal

- "Virtual Insanity" – Jamiroquai
- "Silver Springs" – Fleetwood Mac
- "MMMBop" – Hanson
- "Don't Speak" – No Doubt
- "Anybody Seen My Baby?" – The Rolling Stones

Best Pop Collaboration with Vocals

- "Don't Look Back" – John Lee Hooker with Van Morrison
- "How Come, How Long" – Babyface & Stevie Wonder
- "God Bless the Child" – Tony Bennett with Billie Holiday
- "I Finally Found Someone" – Barbra Streisand & Bryan Adams
- "Tell Him" – Barbra Streisand & Celine Dion

Best Pop Instrumental Performance

- "Last Dance" – Sarah McLachlan
- "Song for My Brother" – George Benson
- "An Gaoth Aneas" – The Chieftains
- "Havana" – Kenny G
- "Soulful Strut" – Grover Washington Jr.

Best Dance Recording

- "Carry On" – Donna Summer & Giorgio Moroder
- "Da Funk" – Daft Punk
- "Ooh Aah... Just a Little Bit" – Gina G
- "To Step Aside" – Pet Shop Boys
- "Space Jam" – Quad City DJ's

Best Pop Album

- Hourglass – James Taylor; Frank Filipetti & James Taylor, producers
- This Fire – Paula Cole; Paula Cole, producer
- The Dance – Fleetwood Mac; Lindsey Buckingham & Elliot Scheiner, producers
- Travelling Without Moving – Jamiroquai; Jay Kay & Al Stone, producers
- Surfacing – Sarah McLachlan; Pierre Marchand, producer

Best Traditional Pop Vocal Performance

- Tony Bennett on Holiday – Tony Bennett
- Julie Andrews Broadway/Here I'll Stay – Julie Andrews
- Mothers & Daughters – Rosemary Clooney
- Sondheim, Etc., – Live at Carnegie Hall – Bernadette Peters
- Film Noir – Carly Simon

=== Alternative ===
Best Alternative Music Performance

- OK Computer – Radiohead
- Homogenic – Björk
- Earthling – David Bowie
- Dig Your Own Hole – The Chemical Brothers
- The Fat of the Land – Prodigy

=== Blues ===
- Best Traditional Blues Album
  - John Lee Hooker for Don't Look Back
- Best Contemporary Blues Album
  - Taj Mahal for Señor Blues

=== Children's ===
- Best Musical Album for Children
  - Roger Nichols, Kris O'Connor (producers) and John Denver (producer and artist) for All Aboard!
- Best Spoken Word Album for Children
  - John McElroy (producer) and Charles Kuralt for Winnie-the-Pooh

=== Comedy ===
- From 1994 through 2003, see "Best Spoken Comedy Album" under the "Spoken" field, below.

=== Classical ===
- Best Orchestral Performance
  - Pierre Boulez (conductor) and the Cleveland Orchestra for Berlioz: Symphonie Fantastique; Tristia
- Best Classical Vocal Performance
  - Cecilia Bartoli for An Italian Songbook (Works of Bellini, Donizetti, Rossini)
- Best Opera Recording
  - Michael Woolcock (producer), Georg Solti (conductor), José van Dam, Ben Heppner, Herbert Lippert, Karita Mattila, Alan Opie, Rene Pape, Iris Vermillion and the Chicago Symphony Orchestra for Wagner: Die Meistersinger von Nürnberg
- Best Choral Performance
  - Robert Shaw (conductor) and the Atlanta Symphony Orchestra and Chorus for Adams: Harmonium/Rachmaninoff: The Bells
- Best Instrumental Soloist(s) Performance (with orchestra)
  - David Zinman (conductor), Yo-Yo Ma and the Philadelphia Orchestra for Premieres – Cello Concertos (Works of Danielpour, Kirchner, Rouse)
- Best Instrumental Soloist Performance (without orchestra)
  - János Starker for Bach: Suites for Solo Cello Nos. 1 – 6
- Best Small Ensemble Performance (with or without conductor)
  - Claudio Abbado (conductor) for "Hindemith: Kammermusik No. 1 With Finale 1921, Op. 24 No. 1" performed by members of the Berlin Philharmonic
- Best Chamber Music Performance
  - Emerson String Quartet for Beethoven: The String Quartets
- Best Classical Contemporary Composition
  - John Adams (composer), Kent Nagano (conductor) and the Hallé Orchestra for "Adams: El Dorado"
- Best Classical Album
  - Steven Epstein (producer), David Zinman (conductor), Yo-Yo Ma and the Philadelphia Orchestra for Premieres – Cello Concertos (Works of Danielpour, Kirchner, Rouse)

=== Composing and arranging ===
- Best Instrumental Composition
  - Wayne Shorter (composer) for "Aung San Suu Kyi" performed by Herbie Hancock and Wayne Shorter
- Best Song Written Specifically for a Motion Picture or for Television
  - R. Kelly (songwriter) for "I Believe I Can Fly" (from Space Jam)
- Best Instrumental Composition Written for a Motion Picture or for Television
  - Gabriel Yared (composer) for The English Patient
- Best Instrumental Arrangement
  - Bill Holman (arranger) for "Straight, No Chaser" performed by The Bill Holman Band
- Best Instrumental Arrangement Accompanying Vocal(s)
  - Slide Hampton (arranger) for "Cotton Tail" performed by Dee Dee Bridgewater

=== Country ===
- Best Female Country Vocal Performance
  - LeAnn Rimes for "How Do I Live"

other nominees

- Deana Carter – "Did I Shave My Legs For This?"
- Patty Loveless – "The Trouble with the Truth"
- LeAnn Rimes – "How Do I Live"
- Pam Tillis – "All the Good Ones Are Gone"
- Best Male Country Vocal Performance
  - Vince Gill for "Pretty Little Adriana"
- Best Country Performance by a Duo or Group with Vocal
  - Alison Krauss and Union Station for "Looking in the Eyes of Love"
- Best Country Collaboration with Vocals
  - Garth Brooks and Trisha Yearwood for "In Another's Eyes"
- Best Country Instrumental Performance
  - Alison Krauss and Union Station for "Little Liza Jane"
- Best Country Song
  - Bob Carlisle and Randy Thomas (songwriters) for "Butterfly Kisses" performed by Bob Carlisle / Jeff Carson / the Raybon Brothers

other nominees

- Bob McDill & Dean Dillon for "All the Good Ones Are Gone" (Pam Tillis)
- Deana Carter & Rhonda Hart for "Did I Shave My Legs For This?" (Deana Carter)
- Bobby Wood, John Peppard & Garth Brooks for "In Another's Eyes" (Garth Brooks & Trisha Yearwood)
- Stephony Smith for "It's Your Love" (Tim McGraw & Faith Hill)
- Best Country Album
  - Rick Rubin (producer) and Johnny Cash for Unchained
- Best Bluegrass Album
  - Alison Krauss and Union Station for So Long So Wrong

=== Folk ===
- Best Traditional Folk Album
  - BeauSoleil for L'amour ou la Folie
- Best Contemporary Folk Album
  - Bob Dylan for Time Out of Mind

=== Gospel ===
- Best Pop/Contemporary Gospel Album
  - Jars of Clay for Much Afraid
- Best Rock Gospel Album
  - dc Talk for Welcome to the Freak Show
- Best Traditional Soul Gospel Album
  - The Fairfield Four for I Couldn't Hear Nobody Pray
- Best Contemporary Soul Gospel Album
  - Take 6 for Brothers
- Best Southern, Country or Bluegrass Gospel Album
  - Peter York (producer) for Amazing Grace 2: A Country Salute to Gospel performed by various artists
- Best Gospel Choir or Chorus Album
  - Myron Butler, Kirk Franklin and Robert Searight II (choir directors) for God's Property from Kirk Franklin's Nu Nation performed by God's Property

=== Historical ===
- Best Historical Album
  - Amy Horowitz, Jeff Place and Pete Reiniger (producers), David Glasser and Charlie Pilzer (engineers) for Anthology of American Folk Music (1997 Edition Expanded) performed by various artists

=== Jazz ===
- Best Jazz Instrumental Solo
  - Doc Cheatham and Nicholas Payton for "Stardust"
- Best Jazz Instrumental Performance, Individual or Group
  - Charlie Haden and Pat Metheny for Beyond the Missouri Sky (Short Stories)
- Best Large Jazz Ensemble Performance
  - Joe Henderson for Big Band performed by the Joe Henderson Big Band
- Best Jazz Vocal Performance
  - Dee Dee Bridgewater for Dear Ella
- Best Contemporary Jazz Performance
  - Randy Brecker for Into the Sun
- Best Latin Jazz Performance
  - Roy Hargrove's Crisol for Habana

=== Latin ===
- Best Latin Pop Performance
  - Luis Miguel for Romances
- Best Tropical Latin Performance
  - Ry Cooder for Buena Vista Social Club
- Best Mexican-American/Tejano Music Performance
  - La Mafia for En Tus Manos
- Best Latin Rock/Alternative Performance
  - Los Fabulosos Cadillacs for Fabulosos Calavera

=== Musical show ===
- Best Musical Show Album
  - Jay David Saks (producer) for Chicago the Musical performed by Various Artists featuring Ann Reinking, Bebe Neuwirth, James Naughton and Joel Grey

=== New Age ===
- Best New Age Album
  - Michael Hedges for Oracle

=== Packaging and notes ===
- Best Recording Package
  - Al Quattrocchi, Hugh Brown and Jeff Smith (art directors) for Titanic – Music as Heard on the Fateful Voyage performed by Various Artists
- Best Boxed Recording Package
  - David Gorman, Hugh Brown and Rachel Gutek (art directors) for Beg Scream and Shout! The Big Ol' Box of '60s Soul performed by Various Artists
- Best Album Notes
  - Chuck Pirtle, Eric von Schmidt, Jeff Place, John Fahey, Jon Pankake, Kip Lornell, Lucy Sante, Luis Kemnitzer, Neil V. Rosenberg and Peter Stampfel (notes writers) for Anthology of American Folk Music (1997 Edition Expanded) performed by Various Artists

=== Polka ===
- Best Polka Album
  - Jimmy Sturr for Living on Polka Time

=== Production and engineering ===
- Best Engineered Album, Non-Classical
  - Frank Filipetti (engineer) for Hourglass performed by James Taylor
- Best Engineered Album, Classical
  - Michael J. Bishop, Jack Renner (engineers), Erich Kunzel (conductor) and the Cincinnati Pops Orchestra for Copland: The Music of America (Fanfare for the Common Man; Rodeo, etc.)
- Producer of the Year, Non-Classical
  - Babyface
- Producer of the Year, Classical
  - Steven Epstein
- Remixer of the Year, Non-Classical
  - Frankie Knuckles

=== R&B ===
- Best Female R&B Vocal Performance
  - Erykah Badu- "On & On"
  - Chaka Khan- "Summertime"
  - Mariah Carey- "Honey"
  - Patti LaBelle- "When You Talk About Love"
  - Whitney Houston- "I Believe in You and Me"
- Best Male R&B Vocal Performance
  - R. Kelly- "I Believe I Can Fly"
  - Curtis Mayfield- "Back to Living Again"
  - Kenny Lattimore- "For You"
  - Luther Vandross- "When You Call On Me/Baby That's When I Come Runnin"
  - Usher- "You Make Me Wanna..."
- Best R&B Performance by a Duo or Group with Vocal
  - Blackstreet- "No Diggity"
  - Az Yet & Peter Cetera- "Hard to Say I'm Sorry"
  - Boyz II Men- "A Song for Mama"
  - God's Property & Salt- "Stomp"
  - Take 6- "You Don't Have to Be Afraid"
- Best R&B Song
  - R. Kelly (songwriter) for "I Believe I Can Fly"
  - Andre Young, Chauncey Hannibal, Teddy Riley, William Stewart, Lynise Walters, Richard Vick, & Bill Withers for "No Diggity" (Blackstreet)
  - Erykah Badu & Jaborn Jamal for "On & On" (Erykah Badu)
  - Kirk Franklin for "Stomp" (God's Property featuring Kirk Franklin & Salt)
  - Mariah Carey, Puff Daddy, Stevie J, Q-Tip, Bobby Robinson, Stephen Hague, Ronald Larkins, Malcolm McLaren, & Larry Price for "Honey" (Mariah Carey)
- Best R&B Album
  - Erykah Badu- Baduizm
  - Babyface - The Day
  - Mary J. Blige- Share My World
  - Boyz II Men- Evolution
  - Patti LaBelle- Flame
  - Whitney Houston- The Preacher's Wife: Original Soundtrack Album

=== Rap ===
Best Rap Solo Performance

- "Men in Black" – Will Smith
- "Put Your Hands Where My Eyes Could See" – Busta Rhymes
- "The Rain (Supa Dupa Fly)" – Missy "Misdemeanor" Elliott
- "Ain't Nobody" – LL Cool J
- "Hypnotize" – The Notorious B.I.G.

Best Rap Performance by a Duo or Group

- "I'll Be Missing You" – Puff Daddy & Faith Evans featuring 112
- "Can't Nobody Hold Me Down" – Puff Daddy featuring Mase
- "Guantanamera" – Wyclef Jean featuring Celia Cruz & Jeni Fujita
- "Not Tonight" – Lil' Kim featuring Da Brat, Left Eye, Missy "Misdeameanor" Elliott & Angie Martinez
- "Mo Money Mo Problems" – The Notorious B.I.G. featuring Mase & Puff Daddy

Best Rap Album

- No Way Out – Puff Daddy & The Family; Sean "Puffy" Combs & Stevie J., producers
- Supa Dupa Fly – Missy "Misdemeanor" Elliott
- Wyclef Jean Presents The Carnival – Wyclef Jean
- Life After Death – The Notorious B.I.G.
- Wu-Tang Forever – Wu-Tang Clan

=== Reggae ===
- Best Reggae Album
  - Beenie Man for Many Moods of Moses
  - Ziggy Marley & the Melody Makers for Fallen Is Babylon
  - Shaggy for Midnite Lover
  - Buju Banton for Inna Heights

=== Rock ===
- Best Female Rock Vocal Performance
  - Fiona Apple for "Criminal"
- Best Male Rock Vocal Performance
  - Bob Dylan for "Cold Irons Bound"
- Best Rock Performance by a Duo or Group with Vocal
  - The Wallflowers for "One Headlight"
- Best Rock Instrumental Performance
  - The Chemical Brothers for "Block Rockin' Beats"
- Best Hard Rock Performance
  - The Smashing Pumpkins for "The End Is the Beginning Is the End"
- Best Metal Performance
  - Tool for "Ænema"
- Best Rock Song
  - Jakob Dylan (songwriter) for "One Headlight" performed by The Wallflowers
- Best Rock Album
  - John Fogerty for Blue Moon Swamp

=== Spoken ===
- Best Spoken Word Album
  - Charles Kuralt for Charles Kuralt's Spring
- Best Spoken Comedy Album
  - Chris Rock for Roll with the New

=== Traditional pop ===
- Best Traditional Pop Vocal Performance
  - Tony Bennett for Tony Bennett on Holiday

=== World ===
- Best World Music Album
  - Milton Nascimento for Nascimento

=== Music video ===
Best Short Form Music Video

- "Got 'til It's Gone" – Janet Jackson
  - Mark Romanek, video director; Aris McGarry, video producer
- "How Come, How Long" – Babyface featuring Stevie Wonder
  - F. Gary Gray, video director; Craig Fanning, video producer
- "I Care 'Bout You" – Milestone
  - Mark Gerard, video director; Melinda Nugent, video producer
- "Early to Bed" – Morphine
  - Jamie Caliri, video director; Adam Stern, video producer
- "Stinkfist" – Tool
  - Adam Jones, video director; Donna Langston & Kevin Willis, video producers

Best Long Form Music Video

- Jagged Little Pill, Live – Alanis Morissette
  - Alanis Morissette & Steve Purcell, video directors; Glen Ballard, David May, Alanis Morissette & Steve Purcell, video producers
- Letters from a Porcupine – Blind Melon
  - Steve MacCorkle, video director; Steve MacCorkle, video producer
- Forever's a Long, Long Time – Orquestra Was
  - Don Was, video director; Larry Shapiro, video producer
- Live in Amsterdam: Wildest Dreams Tour – Tina Turner
  - David Mallet, video director; Monique Ten Berge & Patrick Roubroeks, video producers
- Blue Note: A Story of Modern Jazz – Various Artists
  - Julian Benedikt, video director; Ulli Pfau, video producer

== Special merit awards ==
=== MusiCares Person of the Year ===
- Luciano Pavarotti

=== Grammy Legend Award ===
- Luciano Pavarotti
