= Harbinger (Paula Cole album) =

Studio album by Paula Cole
- Released: July 19, 1994
- Studios: Bearsville (Woodstock, New York); Shelter Island (Shelter Island, New York); Hyde Street (San Francisco, California)
- Genre: Pop rock
- Length: 58:18
- Label: Imago
- Producer: Kevin Killen

Paula Cole chronology
Harbinger (1994)	This Fire (1996)

Singles from Harbinger
- 1. "I Am So Ordinary" Released: 1994

Professional ratings
Review scores
Source	Rating
AllMusic	3/5 stars

Harbinger is the debut studio album by American singer-songwriter Paula Cole. It was released through Imago Records, but, just months after its release, the company folded, so promotion for Harbinger was almost non-existent. A video was shot for the first single, "I Am So Ordinary", and is available on iTunes. There are two different covers for the album, which was re-released by Warner Bros. Records, who picked up Cole's contract in 1995 after absorbing Imago when it folded.

== Track listing ==
All tracks composed by Paula Cole

1. "Happy Home" - 4:46
2. "I Am So Ordinary" - 4:15
3. "Saturn Girl" - 4:18
4. "Watch the Woman's Hands" - 4:22
5. "Bethlehem" - 4:39
6. "Chiaroscuro" - 5:09
7. "Black Boots" - 2:29
8. "Oh John" - 4:30
9. "Our Revenge" - 3:43
10. "Dear Gertrude" - 4:13
11. "Hitler's Brothers" - 3:36
12. "She Can't Feel Anything Anymore" - 4:02
13. "Garden of Eden" - 4:32
14. "The Ladder" - 3:46
- Released singles included "I Am So Ordinary" and "Bethlehem".

== Personnel ==
- Paula Cole - vocals, keyboards
- Kevin Barry - acoustic guitar, high-string guitar
- Paul Bushnell - bass
- Jay Bellerose - drums, instruments [box]
- Gerry Leonard - acoustic guitar, electric guitar, E-Bow, Allen guitar, Leslie guitar
- Mark Hutchins - hihat, programming, tambourine, handclaps
- Laura Seaton - violin
- Mary Rowell - violin
- Eileen Ivers - violin
- Juliet Hafner - viola
- Erik Friedlander - cello
