= Economic development =

Process and policies to improve economic well-being

In economics, economic development (or economic and social development) is the process by which the economic well-being and quality of life of a nation, region, local community, or an individual are improved according to targeted goals and objectives.

The term has been used frequently in the 20th and 21st centuries, but the concept has existed in the West for far longer. "Modernization", and especially "Industrialization" are other terms often used while discussing economic development. Historically, economic development policies focused on industrialization and infrastructure; Since the 1960s, it has increasingly focused on poverty reduction.

Whereas economic development is a policy intervention aiming to improve the well-being of people, economic growth is a phenomenon of market productivity and increases in GDP; economist Amartya Sen describes economic growth as but "one aspect of the process of economic development".

== Definition and terminology ==
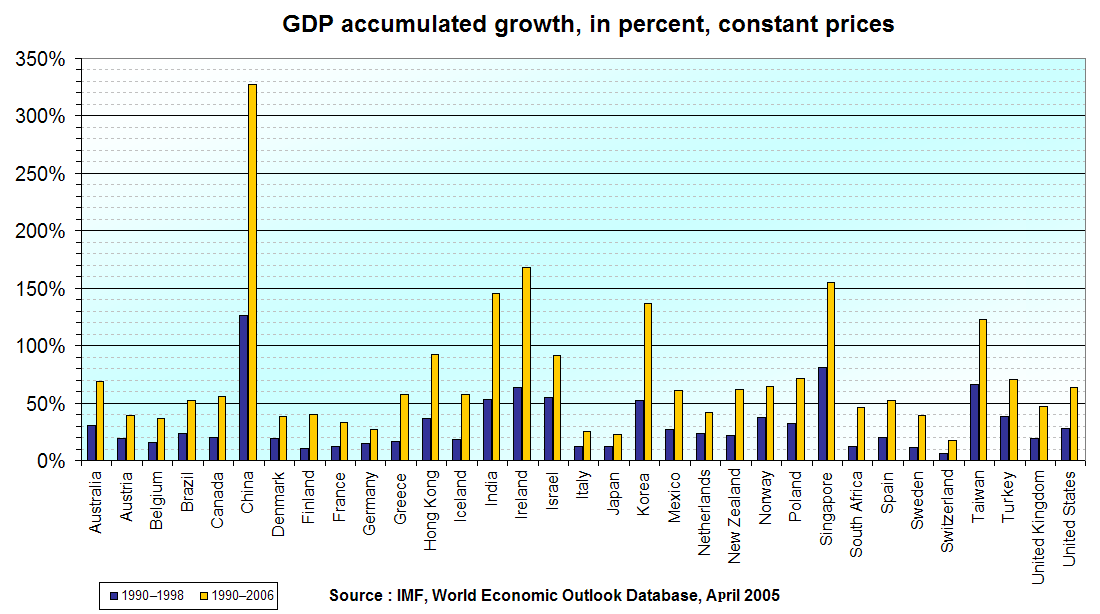
Gross domestic product real growth rates, 1990–1998 and 1990–2006, in selected countries

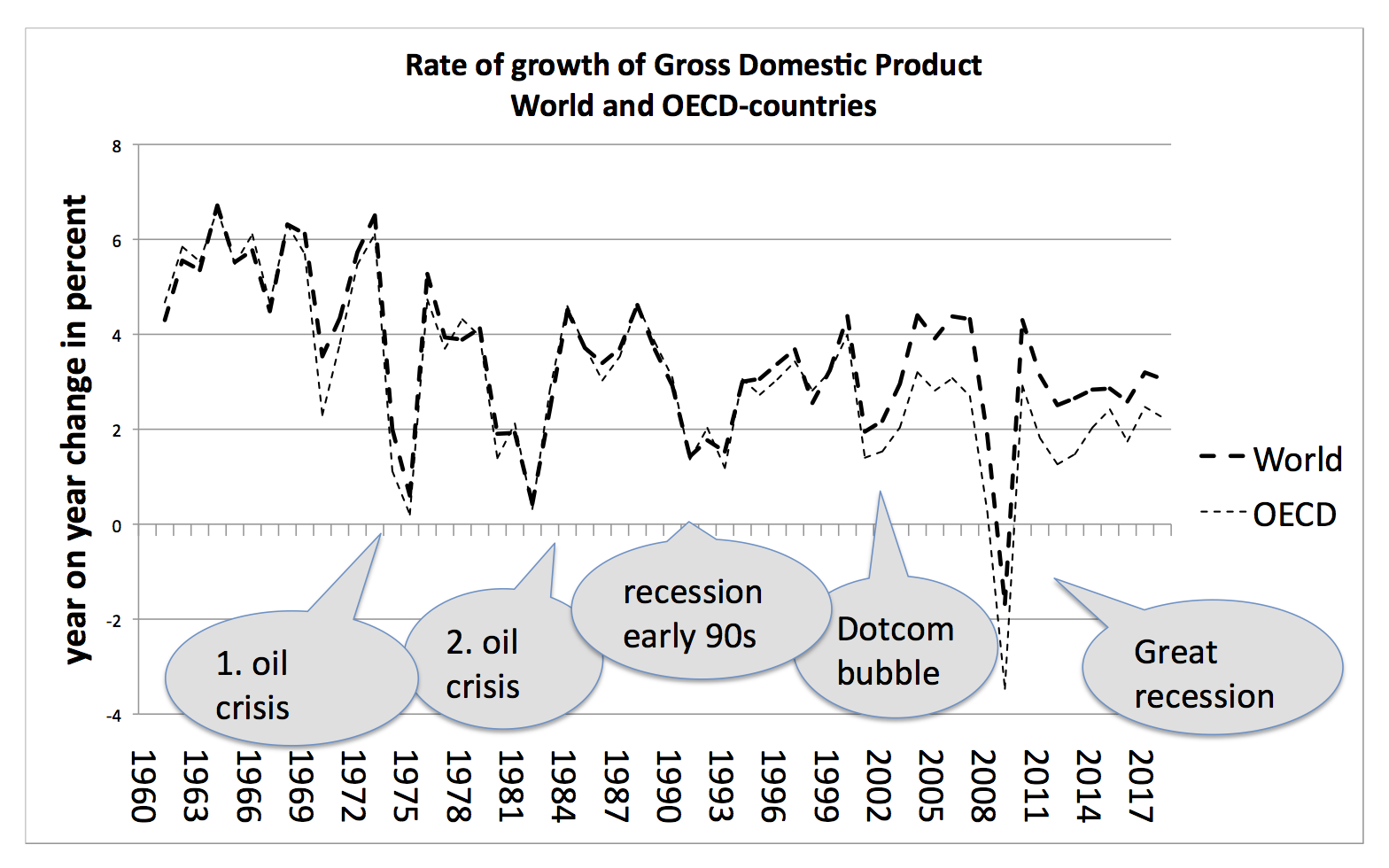
Rate of change of gross domestic product, world and Organisation for Economic Co-operation and Development, since 1961

The precise definition of economic development has been contested: while economists in the 20th century viewed development primarily in terms of economic growth, sociologists instead emphasized broader processes of change and modernization. Development and urban studies scholar Karl Seidman summarizes economic development as "a process of creating and utilizing physical, human, financial, and social assets to generate improved and broadly shared economic well-being and quality of life for a community or region". Daphne Greenwood and Richard Holt distinguish economic development from economic growth on the basis that economic development is a "broadly based and sustainable increase in the overall standard of living for individuals within a community", and measures of growth such as per capita income do not necessarily correlate with improvements in quality of life. The United Nations Development Programme in 1997 defined development as increasing people‟s choices. Choices depend on the people in question and their nation. The UNDP indicates four chief factors in development, especially human development, which are empowerment, equity, productivity, and sustainability.

Mansell and Wehn state that economic development has been understood by non-practitioners since the World War II to involve economic growth, namely the increase in per capita income, and (if currently absent) the attainment of a standard of living equivalent to that of industrialized countries. Economic development can also be considered as a static theory that documents the state of an economy at a certain place. According to Schumpeter and Backhaus (2003), the changes in this equilibrium state documented in economic theory can only be caused by intervening factors coming from the outside.

== History ==
Economic development originated in the post-war period of reconstruction initiated by the United States. In 1949, during his inaugural speech, US President Harry Truman identified the development of undeveloped areas as a priority for the West:

"More than half the people of the world are living in conditions approaching misery. Their food is inadequate, they are victims of the disease. Their economic life is primitive and stagnant. Their poverty is a handicap and a threat both to them and to more prosperous areas. For the first time in history, humanity possesses the knowledge and the skill to relieve the suffering of these people ... I believe that we should make available to peace-loving people the benefits of our store of technical knowledge to help them realize their aspirations for a better life… What we envisage is a program of development based on the concepts of democratic fair dealing ... Greater production is the key to prosperity and peace. And the key to greater production is a wider and more vigorous application of modem scientific and technical knowledge."

There have been several major phases of development theory since 1945. Alexander Gerschenkron argued that the less developed the country is at the outset of economic development (relative to others), the more likely certain conditions are to occur. Hence, all countries do not progress similarly. From the 1940s to the 1960s the state played a large role in promoting industrialization in developing countries, following the idea of modernization theory. This period was followed by a brief period of basic needs development focusing on human capital development and redistribution in the 1970s. Neoliberalism emerged in the 1980s, with an agenda of free trade and removal of import substitution industrialization policies.

In economics, the study of economic development was born out of an extension to traditional economics that focused entirely on the national product, or the aggregate output of goods and services. Economic development was concerned with the expansion of people's entitlements and their corresponding capabilities, such as morbidity, nourishment, literacy, education, and other socio-economic indicators. Borne out of the backdrop of Keynesian economics (advocating government intervention), and neoclassical economics (stressing reduced intervention), with the rise of high-growth countries (Singapore, South Korea, Hong Kong) and planned governments (Argentina, Chile, Sudan, Uganda), economic development and more generally development economics emerged amidst these mid-20th century theoretical interpretations of how economies prosper. Economist Albert O. Hirschman, a major contributor to development economics, argued that economic development grew to concentrate on the poor regions of the world, primarily in Africa, Asia and Latin America yet on the outpouring of fundamental ideas and models.

It has also been argued, notably by Asian and European proponents of infrastructure-based development, that systematic, long-term government investments in transportation, housing, education, and healthcare are necessary to ensure sustainable economic growth in emerging countries.

During Robert McNamara's 13 years at the World Bank, he introduced key changes, most notably shifting the Bank's economic development policies toward targeted poverty reduction. Before his tenure at the World Bank, poverty did not receive substantial attention as part of international and national economic development; the focus of development had been on industrialization and infrastructure. Poverty also came to be redefined as a condition faced by people rather than countries. According to Martha Finnemore, the World Bank under McNamara's tenure "sold" states poverty reduction "through a mixture of persuasion and coercion."

== Economic development in the global south ==
Economist Paul Bairoch argues that forced economic liberalism imposed on the Global South during the 19th century played a central role in delaying its industrialization. Linguist Noam Chomsky argues that successful development has historically required the radical violation of free-market doctrine promoted by the U.S. and the international financial institutions, and that this can be seen with every major economy, including England, the U.S., and the economic miracles of East Asia. Economist Joseph Stiglitz asserts that the "free trade" orthodoxy ignores the fact that today’s advanced nations, such as the U.S. and Japan, built their wealth by protecting infant industries until they were globally competitive. Today, he argues, the International Monetary Fund (IMF) and World Bank demand the opposite, forcing vulnerable economies to open their markets to heavily subsidized Western goods. He contends that this doesn't create growth; it kills jobs. When small-scale farmers and local manufacturers are crushed by foreign competition without the support of low interest rates or social welfare, 'liberalization' becomes a mechanism for producing misery rather than prosperity.

Economist Ha-Joon Chang argues that all developed countries, during their development, from the 14th century until the East Asian newly industrialized countries in the late 20th century, used active state-interventionist industrial, trade and technology policies to promote infant industries and economic development. Consequently, he argues, the free-market policies promoted by the developed countries and the international development policy establishment they control is at odds with historical experience. Chang says that, despite the importance of tariff protection in the development of most Now Developed Countries, it was:

by no means the only, nor even necessarily the most important, policy tool used by these countries in promoting infant industries. There were many other tools, such as export subsidies, tariff rebates on inputs used for exports, conferring of monopoly rights, cartel arrangements, directed credits, investment planning, manpower planning, R&D supports and the promotion of institutions that allow public-private cooperation.

Chang says that economic growth rates in developing nations during the period of state-led industrialization were significantly higher than those achieved under the market-oriented neoliberal reforms. Under state-led industrialization in the 1960s and 1970s, per capita income in developing countries grew by 3.0% annually, according to Chang. He says that following the shift to neoliberal orthodoxy in the 1980s, that percentage plummeted to just 1.7%, and this decline would be even sharper if China and India were excluded. For example, he says, under state-led industrialization between 1964 and 1974, the Middle East achieved robust economic expansion, with GDP and GDP per capita growth rates averaging 7.5% and 4.8%, respectively. However, he says, these figures saw a dramatic decline during the 1985–1995 neoliberal period, falling to 2.9% for GDP and a stagnant 0.3% for per capita GDP. According to economist Alice Amsden's analysis of World Bank data, the period in which developing countriesm implemented state-led industrialization—from 1950 to 1980—marked a historic first: developing economies grew at an average rate of over 5% annually, outperforming developed economies, which grew at 4%. She calls this timeframe "a period of unprecedented expansion in living standards, per capita income, wages, and poverty reduction."

Economic anthropologist Jason Hickel argues that neoliberal economic policies promoted by international institutions such as the World Bank, the IMF, and the World Trade Organization (WTO) over recent decades have aimed to aggressively liberalize markets in developing countries. These measures, he says, have opened economies in ways that grant multinational corporations extensive access to inexpensive land, natural resources, and labor. Sociologist Walden Bello posits that neoliberal policies pushed by the U.S., the World Bank, and the IMF intentionally undermine local producers in developing nations. By lifting import tariffs, deregulating foreign investment, and stripping away labor protections, these policies effectively force local economies into a Western-dominated global market. According to geographer David Harvey, the IMF and WTO drive a "new imperialism" by compelling world markets to liberalize, leading to what he labels "accumulation by dispossession." In his view, these organizations break down national economic barriers with the ongoing support of U.S. intervention.

As early as 2000, the UN Sub-Commission on the Promotion and Protection of Human Rights criticized the WTO's framework as fundamentally biased, arguing that its assumption of equal trading partners ignores the reality of multinational corporate dominance and ultimately entrenches existing corporate monopolies. Sociologist Christopher Doran asserts that the U.S. champions neoliberal agendas both at home and abroad "to restore the class power to the uber-wealthy and take back the gains they had lost under Keynesianism and its government-focused policies of wealth distribution." Richard Peet argues that the Washington Consensus—advocated by what he calls the "Unholy Trinity" of the IMF, World Bank, and WTO—has:

"[E]stablished, protected and reinforced a neoliberal policy regime that served to deregulate the world economy (in terms of national state intervention), freeing the way for global, and particularly US, corporations, the trading of industrial commodities without interference, and the movement of capital assets across national boundaries that have been reduced in significance."

According to economist Robert Pollin of the University of Massachusetts, between 1995-1999, neoliberal policies have led to annual GDP losses of roughly $480 billion for developing countries.

Geostrategist Gérard Chaliand argues that development is far more than an economic problem to be fixed with money—it is inherently a political problem. Further, "[T]here can be no way of overcoming [underdevelopment] except by putting an end to dependence itself and to the structures of the dependent relationships."

== Economic development goals ==
The development of a country has been associated with different concepts but generally encompasses economic growth through higher productivity, political systems that represents the preferences of its citizens as accurately as possible, the extension of rights to all social groups and the opportunities to get them and proper functionalities of the institutions and the organizations that engages in more technical and complex tasks (i.e. raise taxes and deliver public services). These processes describe the State's capabilities to manage its economy, polity, society and public administration. Generally, economic development policies attempt to solve issues in those topics.

Economic development is typically associated with improvements in a variety of areas or indicators (such as literacy rates, life expectancy, and poverty rates), that may be the causes of economic development rather than the consequences of specific economic development programs. For example, health and education improvements have been closely related to economic growth, but the causality with economic development may not be obvious. In any case, it is important to not expect that particular economic development programs be able to fix many problems at once as that would establish unsurmountable goals that are highly unlikely to be achieved. Any development policy should have targeted goals and a gradual approach should be to avoid those goals being burdensome which has been termed by Prittchet, Woolcock and Andrews as 'premature load bearing'.

The State's capabilities, most often, limits the economic development goals of countries. For example, if a nation has minimum capacity to carry out basic functions, such as security and policing, or core service deliveries, it is unlikely that a program, that aims to foster a free-trade zone (special economic zones) or distribute vaccinations to vulnerable populations, can accomplish their goals. This has been overlooked by multiple international organizations, aid programs and even participating governments who attempt to carry out the 'best practices' from other places in a carbon-copy manner with Insignificant achievements. This isomorphic mimicry –adopting organizational forms that have been successful elsewhere– hide institutional dysfunctions without any solutions contributes countries stuck in 'capability traps' where the country does not meets its development goals. An example of this can be seen through some of the criticisms of foreign aid and its success rate at helping countries develop.

Beyond the incentive compatibility problems that can happen to foreign aid donations –that foreign aid granting countries continue to give it to countries with little results of economic growth but with corrupt leaders that are aligned with the granting countries' geopolitical interests and agenda –there are problems of fiscal fragility associated to receiving an important amount of government revenues through foreign aid. Governments that can raise a significant amount of revenue from this source are less accountable to their citizens (they are more autonomous) as they have less pressure to legitimately use those resources. Just as it has been documented for countries with an abundant supply of natural resources such as oil, countries whose government budget consists largely of foreign aid donations and not regular taxes are less likely to have incentives to develop effective public institutions. This in turn can undermine the country's efforts to develop.

== Economic development policies ==
In its broadest sense, policies of economic development encompass three major areas:

- Governments undertaking to meet broad economic objectives such as price stability, high employment, and sustainable growth. Such efforts include monetary and fiscal policies, regulation of financial institutions, trade, and tax policies.
- Programs that provide infrastructure and services such as highways, parks, affordable housing, crime prevention, and K–12 education.
- Job creation and retention through specific efforts in business finance, marketing, neighborhood development, workforce development, small business development, business retention and expansion, technology transfer, and real estate development. This third category is a primary focus of economic development professionals.

Contractionary monetary policy is a tool used by central banks to reduce inflation. In the United States, the use of contractionary monetary policy has increased unemployment.

International trade and exchange rates are key issues in economic development. Currencies are often either under-valued or over-valued, resulting in trade surpluses or deficits. Furthermore, the growth of globalization has linked economic development with trends on international trade and participation in global value chains (GVCs) and international financial markets. The last financial crisis had a huge effect on economies in developing countries. Economist Jayati Ghosh states that it is necessary to make financial support systems in developing countries more resilient by providing a variety of financial institutions. This could also add to financial security for small-scale producers.

Public support for economic development tends to increase with job creation for locals and citizens, while non-citizen job creation can decrease public support.

=== Organization ===
Economic development has evolved into a professional industry of highly specialized practitioners. The practitioners have two key roles: one is to provide leadership in policy-making, and the other is to administer policy, programs, and projects. Economic development practitioners generally work in public offices on the state, regional, or municipal level, or in public-private partnerships organizations that may be partially funded by local, regional, state, or federal tax money. These economic development organizations function as individual entities and in some cases as departments of local governments. Their role is to seek out new economic opportunities and retain their existing business wealth. Modern organizational strategies often focus on 'industry clusters'. Geographical concentrations of interconnected companies and institutions, to enhance regional competitiveness and innovation. The effectiveness of these organizations is frequently linked to 'institutional quality,' where the clear definition of property rights and the reduction of transaction costs enable practitioners to better facilitate private sector growth.

Public-private partnerships have become a standard delivery mechanism for EDOs, allowing for the sharing of risks and resources between government entities and private investors in large-scale development projects. In the modern era, these organizations increasingly focus on digital governance capacity and institutional design as primary drivers for national economic progress and public sector efficiency.

There are numerous other organizations whose primary function is not economic development that work in partnership with economic developers. They include the news media, foundations, utilities, schools, health care providers, faith-based organizations, and colleges, universities, and other education or research institutions.

== Development indicators and indices ==
There are various types of macroeconomic and sociocultural indicators or "metrics" used by economists and geographers to assess the relative economic advancement of a given region or nation. The World Bank's "World Development Indicators" are compiled annually from officially recognized international sources and include national, regional and global estimates.

=== GDP per capita ===
GDP per capita is the gross domestic product divided by mid-year population and adjusted for inflation. GDP is the sum of gross value added by all resident producers in the economy plus any product taxes and minus any subsidizes not included in the value of the products. It is calculated without making deductions for depreciation of fabricated assets or for depletion and degradation of natural resources.

=== Median income ===
Median income measures the economic development of the median voter in a country and was argued to be a more representative measure than GDP per capita. Median income is an income distribution-aware measure related to the real gross national income per capita.

=== Modern transportation ===
European development economists have argued that the existence of modern transportation networks- such as high-speed rail infrastructure constitutes a significant indicator of a country's economic advancement: this perspective is illustrated notably through the Basic Rail Transportation Infrastructure Index (known as BRTI Index) and related models such as the (Modified) Rail Transportation Infrastructure Index (RTI).

=== The GDI and GEM ===
In an effort to create an indicator that would help measure gender equality, the United Nations has created two measures: the Gender-Related Development Index (GDI) and the Gender Empowerment Measure (GEM). These indicators were first introduced in the 1995 UNDP Human Development Report. The Gender Empowerment Measure (GEM) focuses on aggregating various indicators that focus on capturing the economic, political, and professional gains made by women. The GEM is composed of just three variables: income earning power, share in professional and managerial jobs, and share of parliamentary seats. The Gender Development Index (GDI) measures the gender gap in human development achievements. It takes the disparity between men and women into account through three variables, health, knowledge, and living standards.

=== Other factors ===
Other factors include the job creation index, inflation rate, investment level and national debt, birth and death rates, life expectancy, morbidity, education levels (measured through literacy and numeracy rates), housing, social services like hospitals, health facilities, clean and safe drinking water, schools (measured by the distance learners must travel to reach them), ability to use hard infrastructure (railways, roads, ports, airports, harbours, etc.), and telecommunications and other soft infrastructure like the Internet.

== See also ==
- Constitutional economics
- Critical juncture theory
- Democracy and economic growth
- Development finance institution
- European Free Trade Association
- European Union
- Financial deepening
- Gender and development
- Green Development
- Infrastructure
- International development
- International Monetary Fund
- Local Economic Development
- North–South divide
- Organisation for Economic Co-operation and Development
- Private sector development
- Socioeconomics
- United Nations Development Program
