= Revolution (Paula Cole album) =

Studio album by Paula Cole
- Released: September 13, 2019
- Genre: Political music
- Length: 55:37
- Language: English
- Label: 675 Records
- Producer: Paula Cole

Paula Cole chronology
Ballads (2017)	Revolution (2019)	American Quilt (2021)

Revolution is a 2019 studio album by American pop and rock singer Paula Cole.

== Recording and release ==
Revolution explores political themes that connected to Cole's 1999 album Amen and the singer promoted this album by debuting her cover of the Marvin Gaye ecological anthem "Mercy Mercy Me (The Ecology)".

== Reception ==
Writing for PopMatters, Charles Donovan scored Revolution an eight out of 10, writing that her Cole's political emphasis works with her music and considers the album "an exceptional piece of work, a timely reminder of how soulful, perceptive and harrowing a writer and singer Cole is and has always been".

== Track listing ==
All songs written by Paula Cole, except as noted

1. "Intro: Revolution (Is a State of Mind)" (includes an excerpt from a speech by Martin Luther King, Jr.) – 4:17
2. "Shake the Sky" – 3:59
3. "Blues in Gray" – 3:50
4. "Silent" – 8:25
5. "Go On" – 5:58
6. "All or Nothing" – 4:29
7. "7 Deadly Sins" – 5:08
8. "The Ecology (Mercy Mercy Me)" (Marvin Gaye) – 5:15
9. "Undertow (One Life Lost)" – 5:01
10. "Universal Empathy" – 6:58
11. "Dhammapada" – 2:22

== Personnel ==
"Intro: Revolution (Is A State Of Mind)"

- Paula Cole – piano, vocals
- Jay Bellerose – drums
- Chris Bruce – guitar
- Ross Gallagher – electric upright bass
- Nona Hendryx – vocals
- Bob Thompson – speech

"Shake the Sky"

- Paula Cole – piano, handclaps, vocals
- Jay Bellerose – drums, percussion, handclaps
- Chris Bruce – guitar
- Ross Gallagher – electric upright bass, handclaps
- Darcel Wilson – vocals

"Blues in Gray"

- Paula Cole – piano, vocals
- Chris Bruce – guitar
- Ross Gallagher – electric upright bass
- Max Weinstein – drums

"Silent"

- Paula Cole – piano, clarinet, vocals
- Ross Gallagher – electric upright bass

"Go On"

- Paula Cole – piano, vocals
- Jay Bellerose – drums
- Chris Bruce – guitar, electric bass
- Ross Gallagher – backing vocals

"All or Nothing"

- Paula Cole – piano, vocals
- Jay Bellerose – drums
- Chris Bruce – guitar
- Ross Gallagher – electric upright bass, backing vocals

"7 Deadly Sins"

- Paula Cole – piano, vocals
- Jay Bellerose – drums
- Chris Bruce – guitar
- Dennis Crouch – electric upright bass
- Me'Shell NdegéOcello – speech

"The Ecology (Mercy Mercy Me)"

- Paula Cole – vocals
- Jay Bellerose – drums
- Chris Bruce – guitar
- Ross Gallagher – Arco bass

"Undertow (One Life Lost)"

- Paula Cole – piano, handclaps, vocals
- Chris Bruce – guitar, handclaps
- Ross Gallagher – electric upright bass, handclaps
- Max Weinstein – drums, handclaps
- Darcel Wilson – vocals, handclaps

"Universal Empathy"

- Paula Cole – piano, harmonium, vocals
- Jay Bellerose – drums, percussion
- Chris Bruce – guitar, bass guitar
- Jebin Bruni – keyboards

"Dhammapada"

- Paula Cole – piano, vocals
- Chris Bruce – guitar
- Jebin Bruni – keyboards
- Ross Gallagher – electric upright bass
- Max Weinstein – drums

"Hope Is Everywhere"

- Paula Cole – piano, electric piano, drums, handclaps, vocals
- Jay Bellerose – drums
- Chris Bruce – guitar, electric bass
- Ross Gallagher – electric upright bass, drum programming, handclaps, backing vocals

"St. Cecilia"

- Paula Cole – piano, vocals
- Jay Bellerose – drums
- Chris Bruce – guitar
- Ross Gallagher – electric upright bass

Revolution was produced by Paula Cole with co-production by Chris Bruce.

== See also ==
- List of 2019 albums
