= Me (Paula Cole song) =

1998 single by Paula Cole

Single by Paula Cole

from the album This Fire
- Released: February 2, 1998
- Studio: The Magic Shop (New York City)
- Length: 5:00 (album version); 3:36 (radio edit)
- Label: Imago; Warner Bros.
- Songwriter: Paula Cole
- Producer: Paula Cole

Paula Cole singles chronology
"I Don't Want to Wait" (1997)	"Me" (1998)	"I Believe in Love" (1999)

"Me" is a song written, produced, and performed by American singer-songwriter Paula Cole. It was released as the third and final single from her second studio album, This Fire (1996), in February 1998. Released only to radio, the song entered the top 40 on the US Billboard Hot 100 Airplay chart and peaked at number 17 on the Billboard Adult Top 40. In Canada, the song reached number 20 on the RPM 100 Hit Tracks chart. A promotional CD was also distributed in Germany.

== Credits ==
Credits are lifted from the This Fire liner notes.

Studios

- Recorded at The Magic Shop (New York City)
- Mixed at Room with a View (New York City)
- Mastered at Gateway Mastering (Portland, Maine, US)

Personnel

- Paula Cole – writing, vocals, piano, keyboards, production
- Greg Leisz – guitars
- Tony Levin – bass
- Jay Bellerose – drums, percussion
- Roger Moutenot – recording, mixing
- Joe Warda – recording assistance
- Jack Herscha – mixing assistance
- Bob Ludwig – mastering

== Charts ==
=== Weekly charts ===
Chart (1998)	Peak position
Canada Top Singles (RPM)	20
Canada Adult Contemporary (RPM)	17
US Radio Songs (Billboard)	35
US Adult Alternative Airplay (Billboard)	14
US Adult Pop Airplay (Billboard)	17
US Pop Airplay (Billboard)	25

=== Year-end charts ===
Chart (1998)	Position
Canada Adult Contemporary (RPM)	97
US Adult Top 40 (Billboard)	38
US Mainstream Top 40 (Billboard)	93

== Release history ==
Region	Date	Format(s)	Label(s)	Ref.
United States	February 2, 1998	Alternative radio	Imago; Warner Bros.	
United States	February 3, 1998	Contemporary hit radio	Imago; Warner Bros.	
