= This Fire (album) =

Studio album by Paula Cole
- Released: October 15, 1996
- Studios: Bearsville Studios (Bearsville, NY); Magic Shop (New York City); Shelter Island (New York City); Paula Cole's apartment (New York City)
- Genres: Pop; soft rock
- Length: 50:59
- Labels: Imago; Warner Bros.
- Producers: Paula Cole; Kevin Killen ("Hush, Hush, Hush")

Paula Cole chronology
Harbinger (1994)	This Fire (1996)	Amen (1999)

Singles from This Fire
- 1. "Where Have All the Cowboys Gone?" Released: March 25, 1997; 2. "I Don't Want to Wait" Released: October 14, 1997; 3. "Me" Released: February 2, 1998

This Fire is the second studio album by American singer-songwriter Paula Cole, released on October 15, 1996. According to the RIAA, the album has gone double platinum, selling over two million copies in United States and peaked at number 20 on the Billboard 200. According to the booklet, the album is dedicated to "the inner fire of all life. May our seeds of light open, brighten, and sow peace on earth".

Writing and producing the album herself, she recorded all of it in roughly two weeks. Cole released three official singles from the album. The lead single, "Where Have All the Cowboys Gone?" (1997), peaked at number eight on the Billboard Hot 100 and number four on the Adult Top 40. The second single, "I Don't Want to Wait" (1997), peaked at number 11 on the Billboard Hot 100 and was later used as the theme song for The WB teen drama series Dawson's Creek, which ran from 1998 to 2003. The third and final single, "Me", was released in mid-1998 and peaked at number 35 on the Hot 100 Airplay. The song "Feelin' Love" was featured on the original motion picture soundtrack to the film City of Angels (1998).

The album was nominated for seven awards at the 40th Grammy Awards, including Album of the Year, Best Pop Album, "Where Have All The Cowboys Gone?" for Record of the Year and Song of the Year, Best Female Pop Vocal Performance. Cole was also nominated for Producer of the Year and Best New Artist, winning the latter.

== Critical reception ==
Professional ratings
Review scores
Source	Rating
AllMusic	4/5 stars
Entertainment Weekly	A−
The Village Voice	C+

With the album, Cole was hailed by critics. Reviewing for Entertainment Weekly in December 1996, Beth Johnson regarded This Fire as a departure from the "sweet safeness" of Cole's debut album Harbinger, while calling her "a feisty poet with a soaring voice and a funky groove, [who] seems to be nipping at Tori Amos' heels". Critic Glenn McDonald "presciently declared Cole the new queenpin of a female tradition he traced from Kate Bush through Peter Gabriel, Melissa Etheridge, and Sarah McLachlan." McDonald found Cole's genre of music to be a counterpart of the masculinity of heavy metal music, while Robert Christgau said both genres appear "beholden to 'classical' precepts of musical dexterity and genitalia-to-the-wall expression." Appraising the album as merely a "subpeak" of the female-identified genre, Christgau wrote in The Village Voice: "Where Kate Bush overwhelms petty biases as inexorably as Led Zep, Cole is just a romantic egotist who can't resist turning ordinary human problems into three-act dramas. Kate Bush fans will love her."

== Track listing ==
All tracks are written by Paula Cole.

No.	Title	Length
1.	"Tiger"	4:18
2.	"Where Have All the Cowboys Gone?"	4:26
3.	"Throwing Stones"	3:46
4.	"Carmen"	3:45
5.	"Mississippi"	5:07
6.	"Nietzsche's Eyes"	5:32
7.	"Road to Dead"	3:41
8.	"Me"	5:02
9.	"Feelin' Love"	5:37
10.	"Hush, Hush, Hush"	4:22
11.	"I Don't Want to Wait"	5:19
Total length:		50:59

== Personnel ==
=== Musicians ===
- Paula Cole – vocals, piano, juno, tube, Wurlitzer, harmonium, beat box, toy xylophone, didjeridu, clarinet
- Jay Bellerose – drums, percussion
- Peter Gabriel – vocals on "Hush, Hush, Hush"
- Tony Levin – bass, Chapman stick
- Greg Leisz – guitar, pedal and lap steel
- Seamus Egan – Uilleann pipes, whistle
- Gerry Leonard – guitar on "Carmen" and "Hush, Hush, Hush"
- Strings on "Hush, Hush, Hush":
  - Wenyi Shih, Elizabeth Knowles, Judith Insell – violins
  - Chase Morrison – cello
- Seyi Sonuga – string arrangements
- Kevin Killen – shimmer on "Hush, Hush, Hush"

== Technical personnel ==
- Produced by: Paula Cole
- Recorded and mixed by: Roger Mountenot
- Recorded at the Magic Shop, NYC, assistant: Joe Warda
- Mixed at Room With a View, NYC, assistant: Jack Hersca
- "Hush, Hush, Hush" basic track recorded and co-produced by: Kevin Killen at Bearsville Studio, Bearsville, NY, assistant: Paul Marconi
- Mastered by: Bob Ludwig at Gateway Mastering, Portland, ME.
- Art direction: Paula Cole
- Photographs: Jodie Olson
- Stock photographs: David Skernick, W.S. Edwards, P.E. Penn and D. Schiefelbein
- Design: Dirk Walter

== Charts ==
=== Weekly charts ===
Chart (1996–1998)	Peak position
Australian Albums (ARIA)	96
Canada Top Albums/CDs (RPM)	54
New Zealand Albums (RMNZ)	26
UK Albums (Official Charts)	60
US Billboard 200	20

=== Year-end charts ===
Chart (1998)	Position
US Billboard 200	102

== Certifications ==
Region	Certification	Certified units/sales
Canada (Music Canada)	Platinum	100,000^{^}
United States (RIAA)	2× Platinum	2,000,000^{^}
^{^} Shipments figures based on certification alone.
