= Courage (Paula Cole album) =

2007 studio album by Paula Cole

Studio album by Paula Cole
- Released: June 12, 2007
- Studios: AIR Lyndhurst Hall (London, England); Avatar Studios (New York, NY); Capitol Studios (Hollywood, CA); JHL Sound (Pacific Palisades, CA); Sony Music Studios (New York, NY); Tomorrow's Sound Today Professional Sound Studios (California); Westlake Recording Studios (Hollywood, CA)
- Genres: Rock; jazz
- Length: 51:47 (standard edition)
- Label: Decca
- Producer: Bobby Colomby

Paula Cole chronology
Amen (1999)	Courage (2007)	Ithaca (2010)

Singles from Courage
- 1. "14" Released: April 3, 2007; 2. "Comin' Down" Released: 2007

Professional ratings
Review scores
Source	Rating
Allmusic	4/5 stars
PopMatters	8/10
USA Today	3.5/4 stars

Courage is the fourth studio album by American singer-songwriter Paula Cole. It marks her return to the music scene after an eight-year hiatus. The album is a departure from her previous work, towards more of a jazz and folk sound. "14" was the first single, while "Comin' Down" was released to Triple A radio in the US in early August. The record also features the song "It's My Life", which was featured in Mercury automobile commercials.

== Track listing ==
1. "Comin' Down" (Paula Cole, Dean Parks) – 4:01
2. "Lovelight" (Cole, Hassan Hakmoun, Jeff Lorber) – 4:57
3. "El Greco" (Cole, Mark Goldenberg) – 4:40
4. "Lonelytown" (Cole, Jeremy Lubbock) – 4:40
5. "14" (Cole, Patrick Leonard) – 3:38
6. "Hard to Be Soft" (Cole, Goldenberg) – 4:53 (with Ivan Lins)
7. "It's My Life" (Cole) – 5:31
8. "Safe in Your Arms" (Cole, Greg Phillinganes) – 4:56
9. "I Wanna Kiss You" (Cole, Goldenberg) – 5:05
10. "In Our Dreams" (Cole, Lubbock) – 4:17
11. "Until I Met You" (Cole) – 5:03 (with Paul Buchanan)

Bonus tracks:

- "Don't Miss Me" (iTunes version)
- "Hero's History" (Barnes & Noble version)
- "Love of a Lifetime" (Borders version)
- "Peace"

== Charts ==
Chart (2007)	Peak position
U.S. Billboard 200	163
U.S. Billboard Comprehensive Albums	192

== Personnel ==
- Paula Cole – piano, vocals, handclapping
- Tom Arndt – package coordinator
- Pat Barry – art direction
- Jay Bellerose – percussion, drums
- Peter Bernstein – arranger, conductor, string arrangements, string conductor
- Chris Botti – trumpet
- Chris Bruce – guitar
- Paul Buchanan – vocals
- Caroline Buckman – strings
- Susan Chatman – strings
- Billy Childs Trio – piano, Fender Rhodes
- Tim Christensen – strings
- James Farber – engineer
- Fabrizio Ferri – photography
- David Foster – piano
- Brahim Fribgane – percussion
- Steve Genewick – engineer
- Mark Goldenberg – guitar, keyboards
- Hassan Hakmoun – sintir
- Herbie Hancock – piano
- Melissa "Missy" Hasin – strings
- J'Anna Jacoby – strings
- Jimmy Johnson – bass
- Steve Khan – guitar
- Kevin Killen – engineer, mixing
- Billy Kilson – drums
- Gina Kronstadt – strings, concert master
- Greg Leisz – pedal steel
- Tony Levin – bass
- Ivan Lins – vocals
- Jeff Lorber – organ, arranger, keyboards, engineer
- Jeremy Lubbock – arranger, conductor
- Bob Ludwig – mastering
- Pablo Munguia – engineer
- David Palmer – piano, keyboards, melodica
- Dean Parks – dulcimer, guitar, engineer
- David Piltch – bass
- Vincent Potter – stylist
- Kathleen Robertson – string contractor
- Fredrik Sarhagen – engineer
- Al Schmitt – engineer
- Bill Airey Smith – engineer
- Andy Snitzer – digital editing, editing
- Edmund Stein – strings
- Rudolph Stein – strings
- David Stenske – strings
- Ian Walker – bass
- Todd Whitelock – engineer
- Shari Zippert – strings
