= Where Have All the Cowboys Gone? =

1996 single by Paula Cole

Single by Paula Cole

from the album This Fire
- B-side: "Hush, Hush, Hush."
- Released: September 17, 1996
- Studio: The Magic Shop (New York City)
- Length: 4:26 (album version); 3:47 (album edit, radio version)
- Label: Warner Bros.; Imago
- Songwriter: Paula Cole
- Producer: Paula Cole

Paula Cole singles chronology
"I Am So Ordinary" (1995)	"Where Have All the Cowboys Gone?" (1996)	"I Don't Want to Wait" (1997)

Music video
- "Where Have All the Cowboys Gone?" on YouTube

"Where Have All the Cowboys Gone?" is a song by American singer Paula Cole. It was released to radio in September 1996 before being physically released on March 25, 1997, as the lead single from her second studio album, This Fire (1996). The song is Cole's only top-ten hit on the US Billboard Hot 100, reaching number eight, and was her first top-ten hit in Canada, where it reached number seven. It was additionally a critical success, earning nominations for three Grammy awards: Record of the Year, Song of the Year, and Best Female Pop Vocal Performance.

== Style and theme ==
The song traces the stages of a tragic romance. The first two verses explore infatuation and discovery; a bridge expresses disillusionment, and a final verse shifts to despair. A brief transition and a chorus that repeats the song's title follow each verse, and question the loss of the narrator's idyllic dream of spending her lifetime with a Western-styled hero. The song is written in 4/4 time and maintains a minor key throughout. The verse score is minimalist and includes only spoken vocals paired with a low-volume sung melody by Cole (except in the last verse, which is spoken only) over a tight drum track and what sounds like ambient noise in the background, while the transitions, chorus, and bridge use the full instrumentation and Cole's mezzo-soprano range.

== Music video ==
The video was directed by Caitlin Felton. It is simple, primarily featuring Cole in the foreground singing or posing for the camera, while her band plays in the background. These shots are augmented by various shadowy or obscure images of people walking, sitting at a table, sitting in a car and riding a horse. There are several points where the video looks grainy, adding to the effect of the song.

The video was nominated for Best Female Video at the 1997 MTV Video Music Awards, losing to Jewel's "You Were Meant for Me".

== Accolades ==
The song received Grammy nominations for Best Female Pop Vocal Performance (losing to Sarah McLachlan's "Building a Mystery"), Record of the Year, and Song of the Year (losing both to "Sunny Came Home" by Shawn Colvin).

== Track listings ==
US and Canadian maxi-CD single

1. "Where Have All the Cowboys Gone?" (E-Team Drugstore Cowboy mix) – 7:11
2. "Where Have All the Cowboys Gone?" (E-Team Sexuality mix) – 6:57
3. "Where Have All the Cowboys Gone?" (Sylkscreen remix) – 4:54
4. "Where Have All the Cowboys Gone?" (Sylkscreen Bone mix) – 4:52
5. "Where Have All the Cowboys Gone?" (Sylkscreen Dream mix) – 4:54
6. "Where Have All the Cowboys Gone?" (Sylkcity Jazz mix) – 4:54
7. "Where Have All the Cowboys Gone?" (Dekkard's Rancho Pepe mix) – 9:40
8. "Where Have All the Cowboys Gone?" (E-Team Drugstore Cowboy radio edit) – 3:57
9. "Where Have All the Cowboys Gone?" (Sylkscreen radio edit) – 4:11
10. "Where Have All the Cowboys Gone?" (edit) – 3:47

US 12-inch single

A1. "Where Have All the Cowboys Gone?" (E-Team Drugstore Cowboy mix) – 7:11
A2. "Where Have All the Cowboys Gone?" (E-Team Sexuality mix) – 6:57
A3. "Where Have All the Cowboys Gone?" (Sylkscreen Bone mix) – 4:51
B1. "Where Have All the Cowboys Gone?" (Dekkard's Rancho Pepe mix) – 9:40
B2. "Where Have All the Cowboys Gone?" (Sylkscreen radio edit) – 4:11
B3. "Where Have All the Cowboys Gone?" (edit) – 3:57

US 7-inch, CD, and cassette single

A. "Where Have All the Cowboys Gone?" (edit) – 3:46
B. "Hush, Hush, Hush." (album version) – 4:22

UK and European CD single

1. "Where Have All the Cowboys Gone?" (album version edit) – 3:47
2. "Hush, Hush, Hush." (album version) – 4:23
3. "Where Have All the Cowboys Gone?" (E-Team Drugstore Cowboy radio edit) – 3:57

UK cassette single

1. "Where Have All the Cowboys Gone?" (album version edit) – 3:47
2. "Where Have All the Cowboys Gone?" (E-Team Drugstore Cowboy radio edit) – 3:57

Australian CD single

1. "Where Have All the Cowboys Gone?" (album version edit)
2. "Where Have All the Cowboys Gone?" (E-Team Drugstore Cowboy radio edit)
3. "Where Have All the Cowboys Gone?" (Sylkscreen radio edit)
4. "Where Have All the Cowboys Gone?" (Dekkard's Rancho Pepe mix)
5. "Where Have All the Cowboys Gone?" (E-Team Saxuality mix)

== Credits and personnel ==
Credits are lifted from the This Fire liner notes.

Studios

- Recorded at The Magic Shop (New York City)
- Mixed at Room with a View (New York City)
- Mastered at Gateway Mastering (Portland, Maine, US)

Personnel

- Paula Cole – writing, vocals, production
- Greg Leisz – guitars
- Tony Levin – bass
- Jay Bellerose – drums, percussion
- Roger Moutenot – recording, mixing
- Joe Warda – recording assistance
- Jack Herscha – mixing assistance
- Bob Ludwig – mastering

== Charts ==
=== Weekly charts ===
Chart (1997)	Peak position
Australia (ARIA)	32
Canada Top Singles (RPM)	7
Canada Adult Contemporary (RPM)	10
Estonia (Eesti Top 20)	7
Europe (Eurochart Hot 100)	88
Germany (GfK)	76
Iceland (Íslenski Listinn Topp 40)	35
New Zealand (Recorded Music NZ)	32
Scottish Singles Sales (Official Charts)	36
UK Singles (Official Charts)	15
US Billboard Hot 100	8
US Adult Alternative Airplay (Billboard)	6
US Adult Contemporary (Billboard)	27
US Adult Pop Airplay (Billboard)	4
US Alternative Airplay (Billboard)	32
US Dance Club Songs (Billboard)	10
US Pop Airplay (Billboard)	5

=== Year-end charts ===
Chart (1997)	Position
Canada Top Singles (RPM)	59
Canada Adult Contemporary (RPM)	79
UK Singles (OCC)	172
US Billboard Hot 100	38
US Adult Top 40 (Billboard)	10
US Top 40/Mainstream (Billboard)	23
US Triple-A (Billboard)	18

== Release history ==
Region	Date	Format(s)	Label(s)	Ref(s).
United States	September 17, 1996	Triple A radio	Warner Bros.; Imago	
United States	February 4, 1997	Contemporary hit radio	Warner Bros.; Imago	
United States	March 25, 1997	CD; cassette	Warner Bros.; Imago	
United Kingdom	June 16, 1997	CD; cassette	Warner Bros.	
Japan	July 25, 1997	CD	WEA Japan	
