= I Don't Want to Wait =

1997 single by Paula Cole

- U.S. CD single

Single by Paula Cole

from the album This Fire
- B-side: "Hitler's Brothers"; "Bethlehem"
- Released: October 14, 1997
- Studio: The Magic Shop (New York City)
- Length: 5:19 (album version); 4:07 (radio edit)
- Label: Warner Bros.; Imago
- Songwriter: Paula Cole
- Producer: Paula Cole

Paula Cole singles chronology
"Where Have All the Cowboys Gone?" (1997)	"I Don't Want to Wait" (1997)	"Me" (1998)

Music video
- "I Don't Want to Wait" on YouTube

"I Don't Want to Wait" is a song written, recorded, and produced by American singer-songwriter Paula Cole. Cole wrote the song in mid-1996 and released it as second single from her second studio album, This Fire (1996), on October 14, 1997. The single release was successful, reaching No. 11 in the United States and No. 5 in Canada. VH1 ranked "I Don't Want to Wait" as one of the 100 Greatest Songs of the '90s at No. 81. The chorus of the song later served as the opening theme for the American teen drama television series Dawson's Creek, which ran from 1998 to 2003.

== Composition ==
"I Don't Want to Wait"
A sample of "I Don't Want to Wait"

Paula Cole wrote "I Don't Want to Wait" at her spinet piano in her apartment in New York City during mid-1996. Described by Cole as "a very personal song", she wrote the song when she realized that her grandfather was near the end of his life. The song is about him and his wife, and specifically the relationship between their life and Cole's who realized "I don't want to make some of these mistakes. I really hope I don't". Cole has described the central question of the chorus as "Do you say yes to life? Do you embrace the things that give you joy? Or do you cower back in fear or by culture's machinations keeping you small?"

Sheet music for "I Don't Want to Wait" shows the key of G major in common time with a moderate tempo of 87 beats per minute. Cole originally composed the song in F♯ major, but when the songbook for the album was prepared, the song was notated in G major. According to Cole, "most sales [...] are to beginners and intermediate musicians", so the publishers opted against the original key.

== Chart performance ==
On the US Billboard Hot 100, "I Don't Want to Wait" spent 56 weeks within the top 100, peaking at No. 11 in January 1998. The single ranked at No. 10 on the Hot 100 year-end chart for 1998. In Canada, it is Cole's highest-charting single, peaking at No. 5 on the RPM 100 Hit Tracks chart, and it also reached No. 27 in Australia and No. 43 in the United Kingdom.

== Music video ==
The music video for the song was directed by Mark Seliger and Fred Woodward. It was one of Cole's first videos and is based on the concept of a woman who is immortal and had lovers in different time periods, all of whom have died. The cut of the video was originally in chronological order, but for unknown reasons, a cut that was out of order was more frequently aired which led to the directors taking their name off the video, replacing it with the common moniker Alan Smithee.

== Track listings ==
US 7-inch single

A. "I Don't Want to Wait" (edit) – 4:07
B. "Hitler's Brothers" (album version) – 3:35

UK, Australian, and Japanese CD single

1. "I Don't Want to Wait" (edit)
2. "Bethlehem"
3. "Hitler's Brothers"

UK cassette single and German CD single

1. "I Don't Want to Wait" (edit)
2. "Bethlehem"

== Credits ==
Credits are lifted from the This Fire liner notes.

Studios

- Recorded at The Magic Shop (New York City)
- Mixed at Room with a View (New York City)
- Mastered at Gateway Mastering (Portland, Maine, US)

Personnel

- Paula Cole – writing, vocals, piano, keyboards, production
- Greg Leisz – guitars
- Tony Levin – bass
- Jay Bellerose – drums, percussion
- Roger Moutenot – recording, mixing
- Joe Warda – recording assistance
- Jack Herscha – mixing assistance
- Bob Ludwig – mastering

== Charts ==
=== Weekly charts ===
Chart (1997–1999)	Peak position
Australia (ARIA)	27
Canada Top Singles (RPM)	5
Canada Adult Contemporary (RPM)	13
Scottish Singles Sales (Official Charts)	47
Spain (Top 40 Radio)	40
UK Singles (Official Charts)	43
US Billboard Hot 100	11
US Adult Alternative Airplay (Billboard)	3
US Adult Pop Airplay (Billboard)	1
US Adult Contemporary (Billboard)	3
US Pop Airplay (Billboard)	5

=== Year-end charts ===
Chart (1997)	Position
Canada Top Singles (RPM)	29
US Adult Top 40 (Billboard)	18
US Top 40/Mainstream (Billboard)	42
US Triple-A (Billboard)	20

Chart (1998)	Position
Canada Top Singles (RPM)	75
US Billboard Hot 100	10
US Adult Contemporary (Billboard)	7
US Adult Top 40 (Billboard)	12
US Mainstream Top 40 (Billboard)	45
US Triple-A (Billboard)	42

== Certifications and sales ==
Region	Certification	Certified units/sales
New Zealand (RMNZ)	Gold	15,000^{‡}
^{‡} Sales+streaming figures based on certification alone.

== Release history ==
Region	Date	Format(s)	Label(s)	Ref(s).
United States	October 14, 1997	CD; cassette	Warner Bros.; Imago	
Japan	April 5, 1998	CD	Warner Bros.; Imago	
United Kingdom	July 20, 1998	CD; cassette	Warner Bros.	
Japan (re-release)	March 25, 1999	CD	Warner Bros.; Imago	

== In popular culture ==
Screenwriter Kevin Williamson became a fan of Cole's and used "I Don't Want to Wait" as a theme song to his teen drama series Dawson's Creek after being unable to secure the licensing for Alanis Morissette's "Hand in My Pocket". At the time, the use of a pre-existing work for a TV show theme, rather than the commissioning of a new song, was novel. The song became sufficiently identified with Dawson's Creek that it was used in parodies of the show, as featured in the film Scary Movie, the "Peterotica" episode of Family Guy, and the "Escape to Beer Mountain: A Rope of Sand" series premiere of Clone High on its original airing (replaced with "Standard Lines" by Dashboard Confessional in all subsequent airings and the DVD release). The song was featured in the 1998 horror film Urban Legend as a nod to Joshua Jackson's character. Paula Cole said it initially annoyed her how the song became closely tied with Dawson's Creek, but she now feels touched by it. “I Don't Want to Wait" is humorously sung by Eric Cartman in the South Park episode "Trapper Keeper." In this episode, Cartman boasts about his advanced Trapper Keeper while facing a threat from a mysterious figure who warns that it could take over the world.
