= Jay Bellerose =

American percussionist

- Born: Maine, U.S.
- Genres: Rock, pop, folk
- Occupation: Musician
- Instrument: Drums

Jay Bellerose is an American drummer and percussionist known primarily for his session and live performance work. He has contributed to the work of many well-known artists.

== Biography ==
Bellerose was born in Maine. He grew up in Old Orchard Beach, Maine and attended Old Orchard Beach High School. A jazz enthusiast, he attended the Berklee College of Music where he worked with Paula Cole, Torsten de Winkel and others, and eventually went Los Angeles where he was part of Joe Henry's band.

Bellerose has been influenced by blues and jazz, and his sound is in part derived from his vintage 1940s Slingerland Rolling Bomber kit. He often performs with shakers strapped to his ankles. He often uses a shallow 32-inch bass drum.

Bellerose is a member of the Band of Sweethearts, which includes Brad Meinerding (guitar), Eric Heywood (pedal steel guitar) and Bellerose's long-time partner, Jennifer Condos (bass guitar). They frequently accompany Over the Rhine and other artists.

Bellerose performed on the 2007 Raising Sand album by Robert Plant and Alison Krauss and supported them on tour in 2008.

Bellerose supported Robert Plant and Alison Krauss at Glastonbury 2022.

== Discography ==
- The Invisible Light: Acoustic Space, with T Bone Burnett and Keefus Ciancia (2019)
- The Invisible Light: Spells, with T Bone Burnett and Keefus Ciancia (2022)

With Larry Goldings and David Piltch

- 2014: Music from the Front Room (Sticky Mack)

With Adam Levy

- 2016: Blueberry Blonde (self–released)

With Dennis Brennan

- 1995: Jack in the Pulpit (Rounder)
- 1997: Iodine in the Wine (Rounder)
- 2000: Rule No. 1 (Esca)

With Paula Cole

- 1994: Harbinger (Imago/Warner Bros.)
- 1996: This Fire (Imago / Warner Bros.)
- 1999: Amen (Imago / Warner Bros.)
- 2007: Courage (Decca)
- 2016: This Bright Red Feeling (675 Records)
- 2016: 7 (675 Records)
- 2017: Ballads (675 Records)
- 2021: American Quilt (675 Records, distribution through Renew Records, BMG)
- 2024: Lo (675 Records)

With Donna De Lory

- 2002: Live & Acoustic (self–released)
- 2012: In the Glow (Secret Road)

With Rhiannon Giddens

- 2015: Factory Girl (Nonesuch)
- 2015: Tomorrow Is My Turn (Nonesuch)

With Joe Henry

- 2003: Tiny Voices (ANTI–)
- 2007: Civilians (ANTI–)
- 2009: Blood from Stars (ANTI–)
- 2011: Reverie (ANTI–)
- 2014: Invisible Hour (Work Song)

With Elton John

- 2001: Songs from the West Coast (Mercury)
- 2013: The Diving Board (Mercury)

With Hugh Laurie

- 2011: Let Them Talk (Warner Bros.)
- 2013: Didn't It Rain (Warner Bros.)

With Aimee Mann

- 2002: Lost in Space (V2 / SuperEgo)
- 2005: The Forgotten Arm (SuperEgo)
- 2006: One More Drifter in the Snow (SuperEgo)
- 2008: @#%&*! Smilers (SuperEgo)
- 2012: Charmer (SuperEgo)
- 2017: Mental Illness (SuperEgo)

With Alexi Murdoch

- 2002: Four Songs (self–released)
- 2006: Time Without Consequence (Zero Summer)

With Nina Nastasia

- 2002: The Blackened Air (Touch & Go)
- 2006: On Leaving (FatCat)
- 2010: Outlaster (FatCat)

With Over the Rhine

- 2011: Long Surrender (Great Speckled Dog)
- 2013: Meet Me at the Edge of the World (Great Speckled Dog)
- 2014: Blood Oranges in the Snow (Great Speckled Dog)

With Madeline Peyroux

- 2004: Careless Love (Rounder / Universal)
- 2006: Half the Perfect World (Rounder / Universal)
- 2013: The Blue Room (Decca / Emarcy)

With Sam Phillips

- 2004: A Boot and a Shoe (Nonesuch)
- 2008: Don't Do Anything (Nonesuch)
- 2011: Solid State (Littlebox)
- 2013: Push Any Button (Littlebox)

With Punch Brothers

- 2015: The Phosphorescent Blues (Nonesuch)
- 2015: The Wireless (Nonesuch)

With Bonnie Raitt

- 2012 Slipstream (Redwing)
- 2016: Dig In Deep (Redwing)

With Pal Shazar

- 1999: Safe (Stylus)
- 2000: Woman Under the Influence (Stylus)

With Duncan Sheik

- 2002: Daylight (Atlantic)
- 2006: White Limousine (Rounder)

With Regina Spektor

- 2012: What We Saw from the Cheap Seats (Sire)
- 2016: Remember Us to Life (Sire)

With Dave Stringer

- 2004: Mala (Ajna)
- 2005: Japa (self–released)

With Allen Toussaint

- 2009: The Bright Mississippi (Nonesuch)
- 2016: American Tunes (Nonesuch)

With Suzanne Vega

- 2001: Songs in Red and Gray (A&M)
- 2014: Tales from the Realm of the Queen of Pentacles (Cooking Vinyl)

With Kenny White

- 2004: Symphony in 16 Bars (WildFlower)
- 2005: Never Like This (WildFlower)

With others

- 1995: David Tronzo and Reeves Gabrels – Night in Amnesia (Upstart)
- 1995: Guster – Parachute
- 1995: Jonatha Brooke – Plumb (Blue Thumb)
- 1996: Jim Smith – Up Hill (Permanent)
- 1997: Deb Pasternak – More (Signature)
- 1997: Carol Noonan – Only Witness (Rounder)
- 1997: Duke Levine – Lava (Daring)
- 1998: Talking to Animals – Manhole (Velvel)
- 1998: Cry Cry Cry – Cry Cry Cry (Razor & Tie)
- 1998: Jules Shear – Between Us (High Street)
- 2002: Anthony Stewart Head and George Sarah – Music for Elevators (Beautiful Is As Beautiful Does)
- 2002: John Doe – Dim Stars, Bright Sky (Artist Direct / BMG)
- 2002: Josh Clayton–Felt – Spirit Touches Ground (DreamWorks SKG)
- 2002: Peter Stuart – Propeller (Vanguard)
- 2002: Solomon Burke – Don't Give Up on Me (Fat Possum)
- 2003: Gabriel Gordon – Gypsy Living (Surprise Truck)
- 2003: Jenifer Jackson – Love Lane (7 Twenty)
- 2003: Teitur – Poetry & Aeroplanes (Universal)
- 2004: girish – Reveal (Spirit Voyage)
- 2004: Various artists – Bridget Jones: The Edge of Reason (Island)
- 2004: Jim White – Drill a Hole in That Substrate and Tell Me What You See (Luaka Bop)
- 2005: Dave Stringer – Brink (Valley)
- 2005: Cheryl Wheeler – Defying Gravity (Rounder)
- 2005: Rebecca Pidgeon – Tough on Crime (Fuel 2000)
- 2005: Snow & Voices – Snow & Voices (Bird Song / Parasol)
- 2005: Susan Tedeschi – Hope and Desire (Verve Forecast)
- 2005: Tess Wiley – Rainy Day Assembly (Effanel Music)
- 2006: Emily Saxe – Keeping (PS Classics)
- 2006: Audra McDonald – Build a Bridge (Nonesuch)
- 2006: Jennifer Kimball – Oh Hear Us (Epoisse)
- 2006: Merrie Amsterburg – Clementine & Other Stories (Q Division)
- 2006: Till Bronner – Oceana (Decca)
- 2006: Vienna Teng – Dreaming Through the Noise (Zoe/Rounder)
- 2007: Aurah – Etherea Borealis (CD Baby)
- 2007: Various artists – Endless Highway: The Music of The Band (429 Records)
- 2007: Marc Cohn – Join the Parade (Decca)
- 2007: Mary Gauthier – Between Daylight and Dark (Lost Highway)
- 2007: Rickie Lee Jones – The Sermon on Exposition Boulevard (New West)
- 2007: Robert Plant and Alison Krauss – Raising Sand (Rounder / Zoe)
- 2008: Greg Copeland – Diana and James (Diama)
- 2008: Robin Danar – Altered States (Shanachie)
- 2008: Benji Hughes – A Love Extreme (New West)
- 2008: BoDeans – Still (He and He)
- 2008: Lisa Loeb – Camp Lisa's (Furious Rose)
- 2008: Loudon Wainwright III – Recovery (Yep Roc)
- 2008: Rachael Yamagata – Elephants...Teeth Sinking into Heart (Warner Bros.)
- 2008: Rodney Crowell – Sex & Gasoline (Work Song / Yep Roc)
- 2009: Buddy Miller and Julie Miller – Written in Chalk (New West)
- 2009: Grant-Lee Phillips – Little Moon (Yep Roc)
- 2009: John Fogerty – The Blue Ridge Rangers Rides Again (Fortunate Son / Verve Forecast)
- 2009: Ramblin' Jack Elliott – A Stranger Here (ANTI–)
- 2010: Jakob Dylan – Women + Country (Columbia Records)
- 2010: Aaron Neville – I Know I've Been Changed (Tell It)
- 2010: Holly Palmer – Holly Palmer (Reprise)
- 2010: John Mellencamp – No Better Than This (Rounder)
- 2010: Mose Allison – The Way of the World (ANTI–)
- 2010: Patty Griffin – Downtown Church (Credential)
- 2010: Ray LaMontagne – God Willin' & the Creek Don't Rise (RCA / Stone Dwarf / RED)
- 2011: Kip Boardman – Long Weight (Ridisculous)
- 2011: Buddy Miller – The Majestic Silver Strings (New West)
- 2011: Catie Curtis – Stretch Limousine on Fire (Compass)
- 2011: Gregg Allman – Low Country Blues (Rounder)
- 2011: Jeff Bridges – Jeff Bridges (Blue Note / EMI)
- 2011: Meshell Ndegeocello – Weather (Naive)
- 2011: Steve Earle – I'll Never Get Out of This World Alive (New West)
- 2012: Ana Moura – Desfado (Universal / Decca)
- 2012: Curtis Stigers – Let's Go Out Tonight (Concord)
- 2012: Diana Krall – Glad Rag Doll (Verve)
- 2012: Lindsay Fuller – You, Anniversary (ATO)
- 2012: Lisa Marie Presley – Storm & Grace (XIX)
- 2012: Luciana Souza – Book of Chet (Sunny Side)
- 2012: Tanita Tikaram – Can't Go Back (Ear Music)
- 2013: Various artists – Divided & United: Songs of the Civil War (ATO)
- 2013: Thomas Dybdahl – What´s Left Is Forever (Sony Music)
- 2013: Billy Bragg – Tooth & Nail (Cooking Vinyl)
- 2013: Glen Hansard – Drive All Night (ANTI– / Epitaph)
- 2014: Various artists – Look Again to the Wind – Johnny Cash's Bitter Tears Revisited (Sony Masterworks)
- 2014: Billy Childs – Map to the Treasure: Reimagining Laura Nyro (Sony Masterworks)
- 2014: The Secret Sisters – Put Your Needle Down (Universal)
- 2015: Alfie Boe – Trust (Decca)
- 2015: Bettye LaVette – Worthy (Cherry Red)
- 2015: Bony King – Wild Flowers (Pias)
- 2015: JD Souther – Tenderness (Sony Masterworks /Razor & Tie)
- 2015: Jackson Browne – Standing in the Breach (Inside)
- 2016: Angelica Garcia – Medicine for Birds (Warner Bros.)
- 2016: Dave Murphy - “American Landscape”
- 2016: Birds of Chicago – Real Midnight (Five Head)
- 2016: Jenny Gillespie – Cure for Dreaming (Narooma)
- 2016: Chely Wright – I Am the Rain – (Megaforce)
- 2016: Doyle Bramhall II – Rich Man (Concord)
- 2016: Graham Nash – This Path Tonight (Blue Castle)
- 2016: Hayes Carll – Lovers and Leavers (Thirty Tigers)
- 2016: Jeff Parker – The New Breed (International Anthem)
- 2016: Sara Watkins – Young in All the Wrong Ways (New West)
- 2016: Willie Nelson – Summertime: Willie Nelson Sings Gershwin (Legacy Recordings)
- 2017: Imelda May – Life Love Flesh Blood (Decca / Verve)
- 2017: Tift Merritt – Stitch of the World (Yep Roc)
- 2019: Rosanne Cash – She Remembers Everything (Blue Note Records)
- 2019: Sara Bareilles – Amidst the Chaos (Epic Records)
- 2021: Sons of Raphael – Full-Throated Messianic Homage (Because Music)
- 2022: Sharon Van Etten – We've Been Going About This All Wrong (Jagjaguwar)
- 2022: Jeff Parker – Mondays at the Enfield Tennis Academy (Eremite)
