= Raven (Paula Cole album) =

Studio album by Paula Cole
- Released: April 23, 2013
- Studio: Middleville Studios, North Reading, Massachusetts, United States; The Red Brick Carriage House
- Length: 48:58
- Label: 675 Records
- Producer: Paula Cole

Paula Cole chronology
Ithaca (2010)	Raven (2013)	7 (2015)

Raven is a 2013 studio album by American pop and rock singer Paula Cole. The album was crowdfunded on Kickstarter and received positive reviews from critics.

== Reception ==
American Songwriter's Christopher Treacy gave Raven 3.5 out of five stars, calling it "easily her most comfortable and self-assured release to date", speculating that the direct method of release enhanced the intimacy of the music. The editors of AllMusic Guide also scored this release 3.5 out of five, with reviewer Thom Jurek noting how Cole gets to her musical roots and influences with this release and praising the authenticity of the minimal production on the recording. In Glide Magazine, Jeff Demars scored Raven an eight out of 10, calling this one of Cole's "top albums" and noting that it best displays her strengths as a musician. Brandon Veveers of Renowned for Sound praised the eclecticism of the recordings and the editorial staff named this album "Best Music of 2013".

== Track listing ==
All songs written by Paula Cole, except where noted

1. "Life Goes On" – 4:40
2. "Strong Beautiful Woman" – 5:05
3. "Eloise" – 4:14
4. "Sorrow-on-the-Hudson" – 3:58
5. "Manitoba" – 5:33
6. "Scream" (Alan Pasqua) – 3:07
7. "Imaginary Man" – 6:10
8. "Billy Joe" – 4:19
9. "Secretary" – 3:34
10. "Why Don't You Go?" – 4:55
11. "Red Corsette" – 3:30

Kickstarter bonus track

12. "Room to Room"

=== Ravenesque track listing ===
Raven was paired in some markets with the EP Ravenesque that had the following tracks:

1. "Unbroken"
2. "Room to Room"
3. "Good Friend"
4. "Strong Beautiful Woman" (Remix)

== Personnel ==
- Paula Cole – vocals; piano on "Life Goes On", "Strong Beautiful Woman", "Eloise", "Sorrow-on-Hudson", "Manitoba", "Imaginary Man", "Billy Joe", "Secretary", and "Red Corsette"; acoustic guitar on "Billy Joe" and "Why Don't You Go"; electric guitar on "Secretary"; beatboxing on "Secretary"; keyboards on "Eloise"; pump organ on "Strong Beautiful Woman"; clarinet on "Red Corsette"; vocal arrangement on "Life Goes On"; production; hand claps
- Kevin Barry – acoustic guitar on "Life Goes On", "Strong Beautiful Woman", "Eloise", "Sorrow-on-Hudson", "Manitoba", "Scream", "Imaginary Man", and "Billy Joe"; electric guitar on "Strong Beautiful Woman", "Manitoba", "Imaginary Man" "Billy Joe", "Secretary" "Why Don't You Go?"; hand claps
- Mark Drury – art direction
- Mark Erelli – backing vocals on "Life Goes On"
- Mark Goldenberg – electric guitar on "Life Goes On", and "Scream"; lap steel guitar on "Manitoba", "Billy Joe", and "Why Don't You Go?"; pedal steel guitar on "Sorrow-on-Hudson"; resonator guitar dobro on "Eloise"; classical guitar on "Life Goes On" and "Scream", sonic kitchen sink and sonic palette sounds on "Life Goes On and "Scream", string arrangement on "Life Goes On"
- Gerry Leonard – supernova electric guitar on "Manitoba"
- Tony Levin – bass guitar on "Sorrow-on-Hudson" "Manitoba", "Scream", to "Imaginary Man", and "Secretary"; Chapman Stick on "Secretary"
- Bob Ludwig – mastering at Gateway Mastering
- Matt Malikowski – engineering
- Erica McDonald – photography
- Roger Moutenot – mixing
- Jon Ossman – bass guitar on "Life Goes On", "Strong Beautiful Woman", "Eloise", and "Why Don't You Go?"
- Chris Rival – hand claps, engineering
- Suzanne Rival – hand claps
- Ben Wittman – drums on "Life Goes On", "Strong Beautiful Woman", "Eloise", "Sorrow-on-Hudson", "Manitoba", "Scream", "Imaginary Man", "Billy Joe", "Secretary", and "Why Don't You Go?"; percussion on "Life Goes On", "Strong Beautiful Woman", "Billy Joe", "Why Don't You Go?"; baritone guitar on "Eloise"; marketplace sounds on "Imaginary Man"; programming on "Manitoba" and "Imaginary Man"; engineering; mixing; co-production

== See also ==
- List of 2013 albums
