= American Quilt =

Studio album by Paula Cole
- Released: May 21, 2021
- Recorded: January 2020
- Studio: Middleville Studios, North Reading, Massachusetts, United States
- Genre: Folk
- Length: 49:09
- Label: 576; BMG Rights Management
- Producer: Paula Cole

Paula Cole chronology
Revolution (2019)	American Quilt (2021)	Lo (2024)

American Quilt is a 2021 studio album by American pop and rock singer Paula Cole.

== Recording and release ==
After releasing a collection of jazz ballads in Cole considered a second album of musical standards, but felt that the political climate in the United States warranted new material. She delayed that work until 2021 with American Quilt, focusing on Tin Pan Alley, folk, and Americana roots music, which is the style of music she was raised with. She wanted this album to display more diversity in style and genre than her jazz release and spent time during the COVID-19 pandemic finalizing the album, including doing research on songs and American folk art, such as quilts. Cole expressed that she still desires writing new music, but also wanted to continue exploring Americana after recording American Quilt, including the musical heritage from her father, a polka musician.

== Reception ==
The editors of AllMusic scored American Quilt 3.5 out of five stars, with reviewer Stephen Thomas Erlewine noting the challenges of balancing all of the musical influences into one coherent musical statement, summing up that "it's just enough to be fresh yet familiar, the slight left turns indeed drawing attention to commonalities instead of differences".

== Track listing ==
Several editions of American Quilt have been released with slightly varying track listing among the following tracks:

1. "You Don't Know What Love Is" (Gene De Paul and Don Raye) – 5:58
2. "God's Gonna Cut You Down" (Johnny Cash) – 2:56
3. "Wayfaring Stranger" (traditional) – 4:36
4. "Shenandoah" (traditional) – 7:41
5. "Black Mountain Blues" (J. C. Johnson) – 5:08
6. "Good Morning Heartache" (Ervin M. Drake, Dan Fisher, and Irene Higginbotham) – 4:21
7. "Nobody Knows You (When You're Down and Out)" (Jimmie Cox) – 3:10
8. "Bye Bye Blackbird" (Mort Dixon and Ray Henderson) – 4:28
9. "Steal Away" / "Hidden in Plain Sight" (traditional / Paula Cole) – 7:55
10. "What a Wonderful World" (Bob Thiele and George David Weiss) – 2:55

== Personnel ==
"You Don’t Know What Love Is"

- Paula Cole – vocals, production
- Consuelo Candelaria Barry – piano
- Kevin Barry – guitar, guitar solo
- Jay Bellerose – drums
- Dennis Crouch – double bass

"God’s Gonna Cut You Down"

- Paula Cole – vocals, production
- Kevin Barry – acoustic guitar
- Jay Bellerose – drums
- Chris Bruce – electric guitar, guitar drone
- Dennis Crouch – double bass
- Darcel Wilson – vocals

"Wayfaring Stranger"

- Paula Cole – piano, vocals, arrangement, production
- Kevin Barry – acoustic guitar
- Jay Bellerose – drums
- Ross Gallagher – double bass
- Kathleen Parks – fiddle, solo

"Shenandoah"

- Paula Cole – piano, vocals, vocal arrangement, production
- Jay Bellerose – drums
- Ross Gallagher – double bass
- Kevin Barry – lap steel guitar
- Seamus Egan – tin whistle, solo
- Peter Eldridge – baritone vocals, tenor vocals
- Darcel Wilson – alto vocals, soprano vocals

"Black Mountain Blues"

- Paula Cole – vocals, production
- Jay Bellerose – drums
- Ross Gallagher – double bass
- Kevin Barry – acoustic guitar, guitar solo
- Kathleen Parks – fiddle, solo

"Good Morning Heartache"

- Paula Cole – clarinet, vocals, production
- Jay Bellerose – drums
- Consuelo Candelaria Barry – electric Wurlitzer piano
- Chris Bruce – acoustic guitar
- Dennis Crouch – double bass

"Nobody Knows You (When You’re Down and Out)"

- Paula Cole – whistling, vocals, production
- Kevin Barry – electric guitar, guitar solo
- Jay Bellerose – drums
- Chris Bruce – rhythm guitar
- Dennis Crouch – double bass
- Consuelo Candelaria Barry – piano
- Liz Lee – trombone

"Bye Bye Blackbird"

- Paula Cole – finger snaps, vocals, production
- Kevin Barry – electric guitar, guitar solo
- Ross Gallagher – double bass

"Steal Away" / "Hidden In Plain Sight"

- Paula Cole – clarinet, vocals, production
- Jay Bellerose – drums
- Chris Bruce – acoustic and electric guitar
- Keefus Ciancia – sound landscape and sound design
- Dennis Crouch – double bass

"What a Wonderful World"

- Paula Cole – piano, vocals, production
- Kevin Barry – acoustic guitar
- Jay Bellerose – drums
- Ross Gallagher – double bass

Technical personnel

- Sarah Bryant-Cole – artistic design input
- Michael Lau-Robles – design and production at 2310 Design
- Tim Llewllyn – quilt photography
- Gavin Lurssen – mastering at Lurssen Mastering
- Mary Maurer – art direction, design at 2310 Design
- Mike Piersante – mixing
- Chris Rival – engineering
- Ebru Yildiz – photography

== Charts ==
Chart performance for American Quilt
Chart (2021)	Peak
UK Americana Albums (OCC)	31
UK Jazz & Blues Albums (OCC)	14
