= The Bright Mississippi =

Studio album by Allen Toussaint
- Released: April 21, 2009
- Recorded: March 19–22, 2008
- Genres: Blues, R&B, jazz
- Length: 1:01:27
- Label: Nonesuch
- Producer: Joe Henry

Allen Toussaint chronology
The River in Reverse, with Elvis Costello (2006)	The Bright Mississippi (2009)	Songbook (2013)

The Bright Mississippi is an album by the New Orleans Jazz and R&B pianist Allen Toussaint, released on Nonesuch Records in 2009. The album reached No. 8 on the Billboard Top Jazz Albums chart.

== Background ==
The album was produced by Joe Henry and features various guest artists, including Brad Mehldau, Joshua Redman and Nicholas Payton. The album title is taken from the 1963 Thelonious Monk song of the same name and features a new version of the song. The album is a unique juxtaposition of modern and traditional jazz tunes with stylistic cues drawn from both worlds. In an interview shortly after it was released, Nick Spitzer noted that "there's a parade beat to it, a bit of a strut and shuffle. Are you merging the worlds of Monk and Toussaint?” “Well, there's no way around that,” Toussaint replied.

Though he is mostly known for R&B, this is Toussaint's second jazz album. The first was Allen Toussaint's Jazzity Project: Going Places, released online through cdbaby in 2004.

== Critical reception ==
Professional ratings
Aggregate scores
Source	Rating
Metacritic	83/100
Review scores
Source	Rating
AllMusic	4.5/5 stars
Christgau’s Consumer Guide	A−
Mojo	4/5 stars
Paste	8.9/10
PopMatters	9/10
Q	3/5 stars
Rolling Stone	3.5/5 stars
Slant Magazine	4/5 stars
Tom Hull	A−
Uncut	4/5 stars

Critic Stephen Thomas Erlewine gave it a very favorable review on AllMusic, writing that it "stands alone among Toussaint albums".

== Track listing ==
1. "Egyptian Fantasy" (Sidney Bechet, John Reid) – 4:41
2. "Dear Old Southland" (Raymond Bloch) – 6:19
3. "St. James Infirmary" (Traditional) – 3:52
4. "Singin’ the Blues" (Con Conrad, J. Russel Robinson) – 5:40
5. "Whinin’ Boy Blues" (Jelly Roll Morton) – 6:42
6. "West End Blues" (Joe Oliver, Clarence Williams) – 3:52
7. "Blue Drag" (Django Reinhardt) – 4:22
8. "Just a Closer Walk with Thee" (Traditional) – 5:11
9. "Bright Mississippi" (Thelonious Monk) – 5:08
10. "Day Dream" (Duke Ellington, Billy Strayhorn) – 5:27
11. "Long, Long Journey" (Leonard Feather) – 4:51
12. "Solitude" (Duke Ellington, Irving Mills, Eddie DeLange) – 5:31

== Personnel ==
- Allen Toussaint – piano and vocal
- Don Byron – clarinet
- Nicholas Payton – trumpet
- Marc Ribot – acoustic guitar
- David Piltch – upright bass
- Jay Bellerose – drums and percussion
- Brad Mehldau – piano
- Joshua Redman – tenor saxophone
