= Amen (Paula Cole album) =

1999 studio album by Paula Cole

Amen.

Studio album by Paula Cole Band
- Released: September 28, 1999
- Recorded: March–July 1999
- Studio: Globe Studios (New York City)
- Genre: Pop rock
- Length: 51:19
- Labels: Imago, Warner Bros.
- Producer: Paula Cole

Paula Cole Band chronology
This Fire (1996)	Amen. (1999)	Courage (2007)

Singles from Amen
- 1. "I Believe in Love" Released: August 30, 1999; 2. "Be Somebody" Released: March 6, 2000; 3. "Amen" Released: 2000

Professional ratings
Review scores
Source	Rating
AllMusic	4/5 stars
Rolling Stone	2.5/5 stars

Amen. is the third studio album by Paula Cole. It is officially credited to "The Paula Cole Band". The album was stylistically a major departure from Cole's previous album, This Fire, and was met with mixed reviews. Commercially, the album failed to match the success of This Fire, peaking at number 92 on the Billboard 200 chart, and selling 116,000 copies to date.

The album did, however, score a moderate Adult Top 40 radio format hit with "I Believe in Love", which peaked at number 22. A remix made for dance clubs and rhythmic radio format peaked at number 18 on the Hot Dance Music/Club Play, and also attained moderate airplay.

== Track listing ==
Amen
No.	Title	Writer(s)	Length
1.	"I Believe in Love"	Paula Cole	5:48
2.	"Amen"	Paula Cole	5:58
3.	"La Tonya"	Paula Cole	6:13
4.	"Pearl"	Paula Cole	6:05
5.	"Be Somebody" (featured vocalist T-Boz)	Paula Cole	5:15
6.	"Rhythm of Life"	Paula Cole	7:50
7.	"Free"	Paula Cole	3:54
8.	"Suwannee Jo"	Paula Cole	5:24
9.	"God Is Watching"	Paula Cole	4:47

Japanese bonus track
No.	Title	Music	Length
10.	"Feelin' Da Love" (featuring Missy "Misdemeanor" Elliott)	Paula Cole	5:21

== Personnel ==
- Jamshied Sharifi – arranger, orchestra and string quartet conductor
- Tony Levin – bass, electric upright bass, Chapman Stick
- Alfredo Hidrovo – bongos, shaker
- Jay Bellerose – drums, tambourine, snare [toy], shaker, hihat [additional]
- Kevin Barry – electric guitar [wah], acoustic guitar, e-bow, electric sitar guitar, baritone guitar, Moog guitar], Fillanoma guitar, mandolin, acoustic slide guitar
- Paula Cole – electric piano [Rhodes], bass [Rhodes], synthesizer [Moog], piano, bass [Juno], electric guitar [low-tuned], Clavinet, [Wah] clarinet, finger snaps, vocals
- Susan Jolles – harp
- DJ Premier – scratches
- Greg Leisz – pedal steel guitar
- Tionne "T-Boz" Wattkins – backing vocals
