= Paula Cole =

American singer (born 1968)

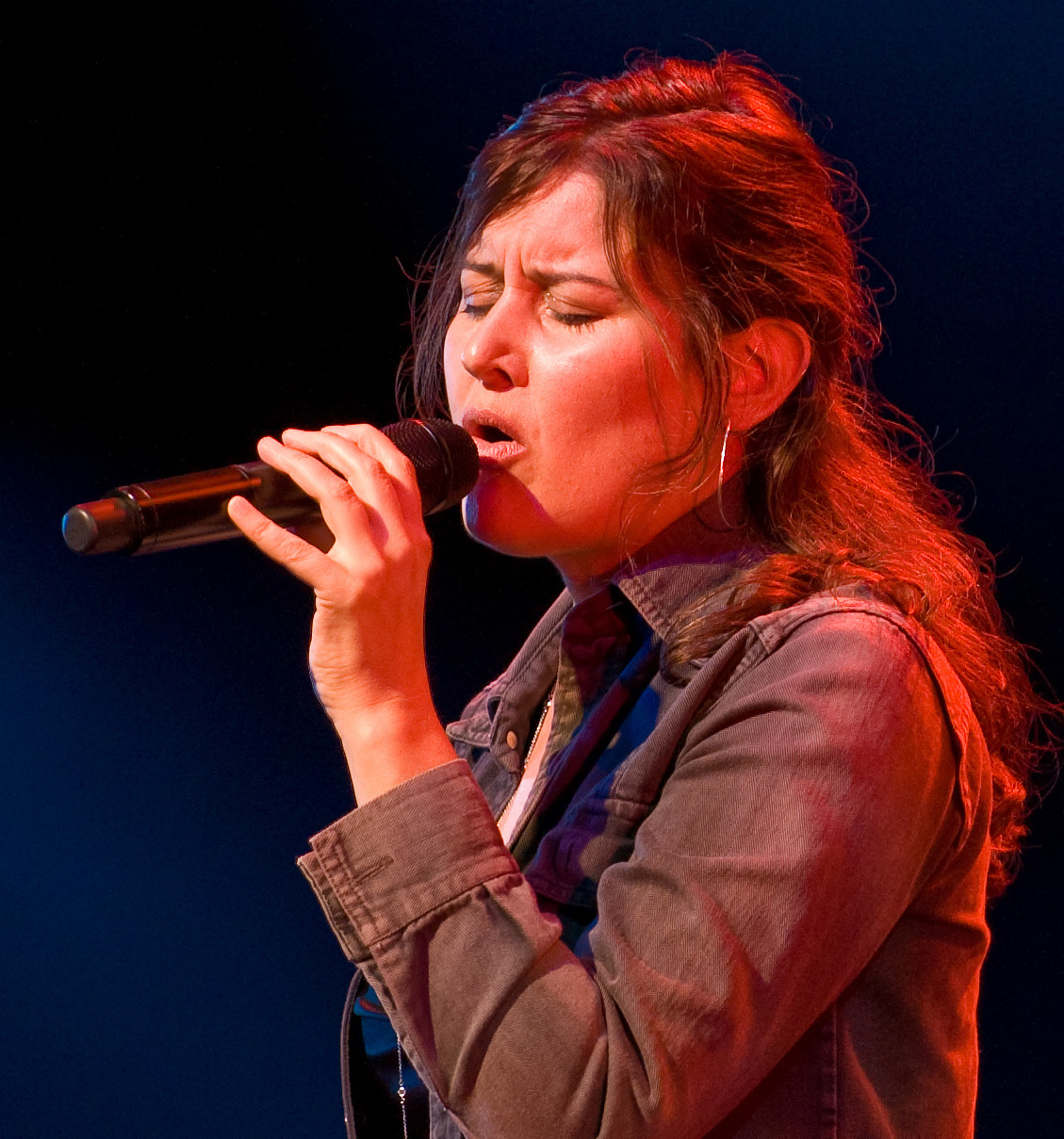
- Cole performing in 2009

Background information
- Born: Paula Dorothy Cole; April 5, 1968 (age 58)
- Origin: Rockport, Massachusetts, U.S.
- Genres: Pop; rock
- Occupations: Singer; songwriter; record producer
- Instruments: Vocals; keyboards
- Years active: 1992–present
- Labels: Imago/Warner Bros.; Columbia; Decca; 675 Recordings

Paula Dorothy Cole (born April 5, 1968) is an American singer and songwriter. After gaining attention for her performances as a vocalist on Peter Gabriel's 1993–1994 Secret World Tour, she released her first album, Harbinger, which suffered from a lack of promotion when the label, Imago Records, folded shortly after its release. Her second album, This Fire (1996), brought her worldwide acclaim, peaking at number 20 on the Billboard 200 album chart and producing two hit singles, the triple-Grammy nominated "Where Have All the Cowboys Gone?", which reached the top ten of the Billboard Hot 100 in 1997, and "I Don't Want to Wait", which was used as the theme song of the television show Dawson's Creek. Cole was a featured performer in the 1996 prototype mini-tour for Lilith Fair, and also was a headliner for Lilith Fair in 1997 and 1998. She won the Grammy Award for Best New Artist in 1998, and that same year became the first woman to be nominated for "Producer of the Year" without a male collaborator.

Her third album, 1999's Amen, marked a major stylistic departure for Cole, alienating many of her former fans; its sales were disappointing compared with those of her previous multi-Platinum album. She has since released several more albums including the jazz-influenced Courage (2007), and Ithaca (2010) which marked a return to her 1990s folk-rock sound. She released Lo in 2024. Cole's music sometimes addresses social issues such as gender stereotypes, environmental issues, the history of slavery in the United States, and the Iraq war. Besides recording and performing, Cole has also served on the faculty at Berklee College of Music since 2013.

== Early life ==
Cole was raised in Rockport, Massachusetts. Her mother, Stephanie Cole, a mixed media artist, was an elementary school art teacher; her father, Jim Cole, was a professor of biology and ecology at Salem State College and played bass in the polka band "Johnny Prytko and the Connecticut Hi-Tones". Her older sister Irene played piano. She has stated she has Irish, Italian and Polish ancestry.

She attended Rockport High School, where she was president of her senior class and performed in school theatrical productions such as South Pacific. Cole then attended Berklee College of Music in Boston, where she studied jazz singing and improvisation with Bob Stoloff. She sang jazz standards at lounges and nightclubs. One of her school projects was with Vox One, a chorus group at Berklee that later turned to professional as well. She was offered a record deal by the jazz label GRP Records, but decided to turn it down.

After graduating Berklee, she moved to San Francisco and began working on song ideas. She lived with three roommates and ate meagerly, building up her home studio and writing down song ideas including one that later became "Where Have All the Cowboys Gone?" Impressing label president Terry Ellis with her demo performances, she signed with his Imago Records in 1992, and was coached by veteran artist's manager John Carter on the album project that would become Harbinger.

== Career ==
=== 1993–1998: Harbinger and This Fire ===
Cole interviewed in 1998.

Cole got her first big professional break when she was invited to perform on Peter Gabriel's 1993–94 Secret World Tour. To replace Sinéad O'Connor who left the tour, Gabriel sought Cole on the recommendation of his studio engineer Kevin Killen. Gabriel left an answering machine message for her at her apartment in San Francisco, and she immediately flew to Mannheim, Germany, for her only rehearsal with Gabriel, shortly before performing in front of 16,000 people.

Cole joined the two last legs of Peter Gabriel's 1993–94 Secret World tour. A video of the concert was shot just days after Cole joined the tour. The video was released as Secret World Live, with Cole covering all the primary female vocals and featured in duets with Gabriel, especially the songs "Don't Give Up" on which she sang the part that Kate Bush recorded with Gabriel in 1986, and "Blood of Eden" recorded by Gabriel and Sinéad O'Connor in 1992. The film received the 1996 Grammy Award for Best Long Form Music Video. Cole was also the main female vocalist on Secret World Live, the audio album documenting the tour. The tour gave Cole international exposure as well as experience performing on a large stage. Her performance earned high praise: in a retrospective review, PopMatters wrote that Cole was "one of the real stars" on the tour, that she easily handled Kate Bush's parts, and that she was "maybe a superior vocalist" to Sinéad O'Connor.

Shortly after the tour, Cole released her first album Harbinger in 1994. She appeared with Melissa Etheridge to sing a duet on VH1. Imago Records went out of business a few months after the album came out. In 1995, Cole signed on to Warner Bros. Records. Warner reissued Harbinger in the autumn of 1995.

Harbinger featured songs dwelling on Cole's personal thoughts on discrimination and unhappiness. The songs were musically lush but driven and bleak. The accompanying artwork featured photographs of Cole with a boyishly short haircut, wearing loose fitting black sweatclothes, combat boots and nose ring. Imago Records folded and promotion of Harbinger was limited, affecting its sales. A single, "I Am So Ordinary", was released with a black-and-white video that reflected the album's artwork.

In late 1996, Cole released her second album on Warner, This Fire, which was entirely self-produced. The album's debut single, "Where Have All the Cowboys Gone?", went to No. 8 on Billboard magazine's pop chart. The follow-up single "I Don't Want to Wait" reached No. 11, its popularity bolstered by its use as the theme song for the hit teen drama series Dawson's Creek which debuted over a year after the album. The single "Me" (No. 35 Airplay chart) was also released as a radio-only single. The title "Hush, Hush, Hush", a duet with Peter Gabriel, talks about AIDS and about a young man dying in his father's comforting arms. "Feelin' Love" was a single that was included on the soundtrack to City of Angels.

In 1996, Cole, along with Sarah McLachlan, Suzanne Vega, Lisa Loeb and others, was a featured performer in a four show mini-tour that served as a prototype for what would become the Lilith Fair tour. She was also a headliner for the Lilith Fair tours in 1997 and 1998. She was nominated for several Grammy Awards in 1997. Among them was "Producer of the Year" (Cole was the third woman to ever be nominated in this category after Janet Jackson in 1990 and Mariah Carey in 1992, but the first as a solo nomination); she did not win, but she did go on to win "Best New Artist" that same year.

=== 1999–2006: Amen, hiatus, and motherhood ===
In 1999, Cole released her third album, Amen, which she described as a sociopolitical and spiritual album. The album was received well by critics but was not a commercial success. Following the release of Amen, Cole took a seven-year hiatus to care for her daughter.

A fourth album was recorded with Hugh Padgham but the label refused to release it; in 2005 Cole uploaded one of the tracks, "Singing Out My Life", to her own website to get her sound heard. She also recorded a song called "It's My Life" during these sessions, which can be heard in Mercury automobile commercials. Cole also made a home recording of a song protesting President Bush and the Iraq War titled "My Hero, Mr. President!", which she posted on her website.

=== 2007–2013: Courage, Ithaca, and Raven ===
Cole returned in June 2007 with her fourth studio album, Courage, which was released on Decca Records and produced by Bobby Colomby at Capitol Studios.

Cole's fifth studio album, Ithaca, was released September 21, 2010. She wrote and co-produced all of the songs on the album. Cole says it "represents that inner fortitude and the journey I've been on."

Raven, Cole's sixth studio album, was funded by a Kickstarter campaign which ran from September 22 to October 29, 2012, and raised $75,258. The album was released on April 23, 2013, on her 675 label. Cole wrote the 11 songs on the album including two from early in her career, "Imaginary Man" and "Manitoba". Her mother had saved these songs on cassette tapes. Most of the album was recorded in one week at a barn in Massachusetts. The musicians included co-producer/drummer Ben Wittman, guitarist Kevin Barry and bassist Tony Levin. She has worked with Wittman and Barry since she was 19.

=== 2014–2018: 7, This Bright Red Feeling, and Ballads ===
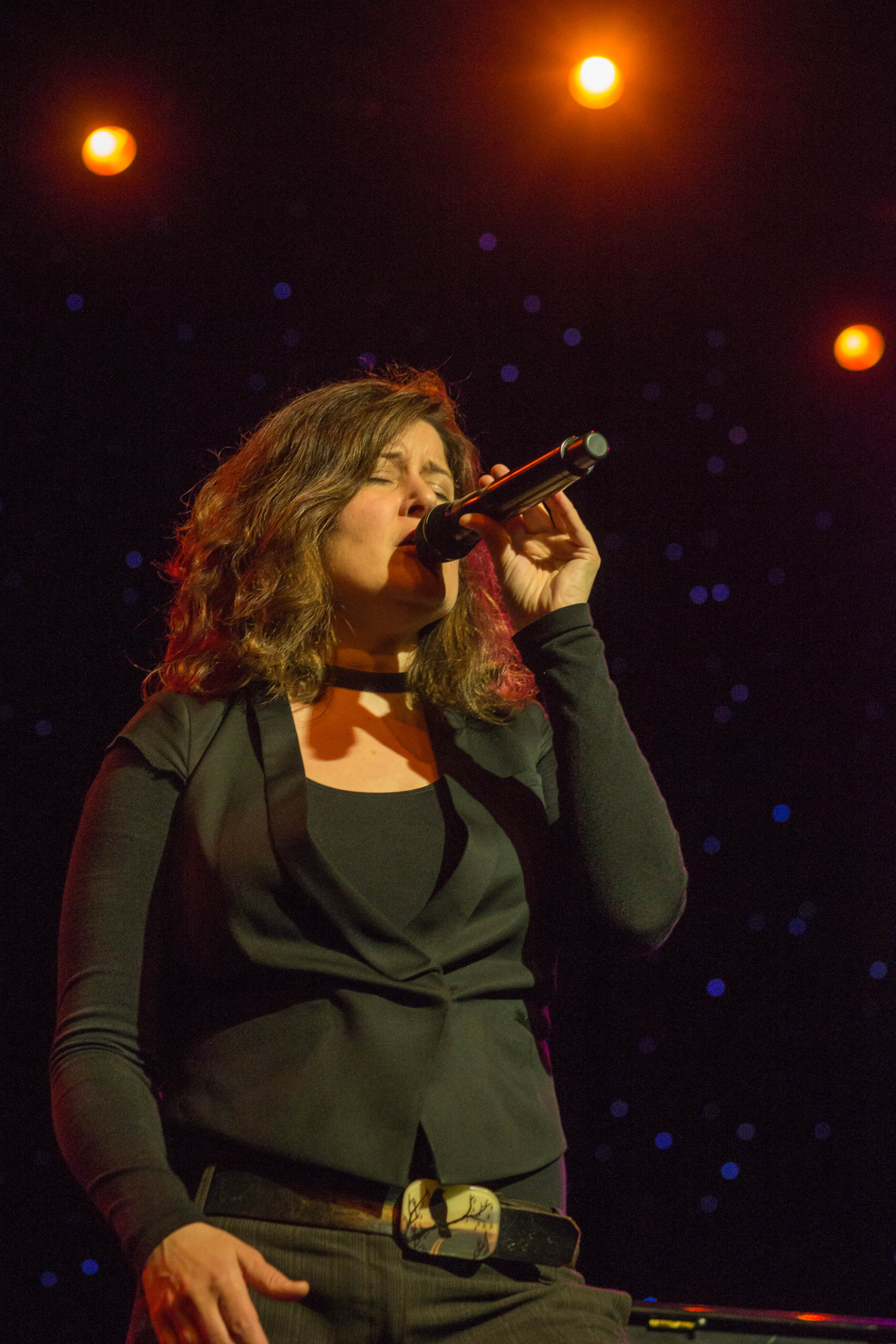
Cole performing in 2013

7 is Cole's seventh studio album, released on March 23, 2015, via Cole's website and to other digital music outlets on April 10, 2015. In Cole's words, it is "a collection of songs that came suddenly and urgently. The songs demanded to be written and released, as if my subconscious needed to reach out to me; to tell me what it thought about all I was going through. I recorded this album live, as an acoustic quartet. It sounds like a soft, soulful album made in the 1960s and the songs speak for themselves."

Cole announced that she was selling her new live album This Bright Red Feeling exclusively on CD at live shows and at her website, with intentions to put it online for digital sale soon. The album is a recording of her live New York City show on May 1, 2016, but also includes re-recordings of two of her biggest commercial hits. The album's title comes from a lyric from her song Tiger.

Cole announced a new Kickstarter project on June 16, 2016, for a covers studio album, Ballads. It raised $76,899. The album was released on August 11, 2017. The first single, a cover of Billie Holiday's "God Bless the Child", was released on June 1. The album hit No. 9 on the Billboard Traditional Jazz Album Chart.

=== 2019–2021: Revolution, American Quilt ===
Paula Cole released her ninth studio album, Revolution, on September 13, 2019, on 675 Records.

In 2021, Cole released the album American Quilt.

=== 2024–present: Lo ===
Cole released her 11th studio album, Lo, on March 1, 2024. The track "The Replacements & Dinosaur Jr." is a tribute to her late friend and mentor, Mark Hutchins.

In 2025, Cole appeared as herself in the documentary film Lilith Fair: Building a Mystery – The Untold Story, reflecting on the legacy and impact of the all-female music festival.

To celebrate the 30th anniversary of her breakout album, This Fire, Cole announced she would be touring in fall 2026 in the US, continuing in spring 2027 in Europe and performing the album in its entirety.

=== Social commentary ===
Cole said her 1996 song "Where Have All the Cowboys Gone?" was intended as a commentary on gender stereotypes, but the feminist message was misinterpreted by many listeners who did not realize the song was intended to be satirical. In 2003, Cole recorded a song called "My Hero, Mr. President" that she released for free download, which was critical of President George W. Bush and America's involvement in the Iraq War. Robert Morast of the Argus Leader reported that Cole was the first "bona fide mainstream musician" to take a public stance against the Iraq war. On her 2019 album Revolution, Cole covered a version of the Marvin Gaye song "Mercy Mercy Me (The Ecology)" which she said was about "planetary health". Cole told Billboard Magazine that while love songs matter, there should also be songs about important societal issues. Cole's song "Silent", also on the album Revolution, is about her experience of being sexually assaulted early in her career and her refusal to continue to be silent about the experience. In May 2021, Cole told USA Today that her song "Hidden in Plain Sight" addressed the "shameful history of slavery."

== Other activities ==
In August 2007, Cole toured the United States with Mandy Moore.

On June 17, 2008, she sang "The Star-Spangled Banner" at Game 6 of the NBA Finals in Boston. In August 2008 and 2009, Cole continued to tour and promote her CD Courage.

In 2013, Cole joined the voice faculty at Berklee College of Music as a visiting scholar.

In 2022, Cole collaborated with Jason Isbell and John Paul White on the song “Mother, Son and Holy Ghost.”

In 2024, Cole competed in season 12 of The Masked Singer as "Ship" in which she briefly rode a ship-like vehicle in the first appearance, and had Jewel (who won season six as "Queen of Hearts") as her Mask Ambassador. She was eliminated in the Group A finals alongside Marsai Martin as "Woodpecker" and did an encore of "I Don't Want to Wait".

== Personal life ==
In June 2002, Cole married Moroccan musician Hassan Hakmoun, whom she had met on the Secret World Tour in 1994. The couple divorced in 2007. They have one daughter, born in 2001. Cole is openly bisexual and came out in 2022.

== Discography ==
=== Studio albums ===
- Harbinger (1994)
- This Fire (1996)
- Amen (1999)
- Courage (2007)
- Ithaca (2010)
- Raven (2013)
- 7 (2015)
- Ballads (2017)
- Revolution (2019)
- American Quilt (2021)
- Lo (2024)

=== EP ===
- Ravenesque (2013)

=== Live album ===
- This Bright Red Feeling (2016)

=== Compilations ===
- Greatest Hits: Postcards from East Oceanside (2006)
- Sonic Memoir, Vol. I (2026)
- Sonic Memoir, Vol. II (Demos 1989–1998) (2026)

=== Singles ===
Year	Single	Peak chart positions									Album
Year	Single	US	US AC	US Adult	US Alt	US Dance	US Pop	AUS	CAN	UK	Album
1994	"I Am So Ordinary"	—	—	—	—	—	—	—	42	—	Harbinger
1997	"Where Have All the Cowboys Gone?"	8	27	4	32	10	5	32	7	15	This Fire
1997	"I Don't Want to Wait"	11	3	1	—	—	5	27	5	43	This Fire
1998	"Me"	— (Note: "Me" did not chart on the Billboard Hot 100 because it was not released as a commercial single in the United States; at the time, only songs that were commercially released as singles were eligible, but it did peak at number 35 on the Hot 100 Airplay chart.)	—	17	—	—	25	—	20	—	This Fire
1999	"I Believe in Love"	— (Note: "I Believe in Love" did not enter the Billboard Hot 100, but peaked at number 12 on the Bubbling Under Hot 100 chart, which acts as a 25-song extension of the Billboard Hot 100 chart.)	—	22	—	18	39	102	37	—	Amen
2000	"Be Somebody"	—	—	—	—	—	—	—	—	—	Amen
2000	"Amen"	—	—	—	—	—	—	—	—	—	Amen
2007	"14"	—	—	—	—	—	—	—	—	—	Courage
2007	"Comin' Down"	—	—	—	—	—	—	—	—	—	Courage
2010	"Music in Me"	—	—	—	—	—	—	—	—	—	Ithaca
2013	"Eloise"	—	—	—	—	—	—	—	—	—	Raven
2017	"God Bless the Child"	—	—	—	—	—	—	—	—	—	Ballads
2019	"The Ecology (Mercy Mercy Me)"	—	—	—	—	—	—	—	—	—	Revolution
"—" denotes releases that did not chart

== Awards and nominations ==
Year	Association	Category	Nominated work	Result
1997	Billboard Music Awards	Top Adult Top 40 Artist	Paula Cole	Nominated
1997	Billboard Music Video Awards	FAN.tastic Video	"Where Have All the Cowboys Gone?"	Nominated
1997	MTV Video Music Awards	Best Female Video	"Where Have All the Cowboys Gone?"	Nominated
1998	40th Grammy Awards	Record of the Year	"Where Have All the Cowboys Gone?"	Nominated
1998	40th Grammy Awards	Song of the Year	"Where Have All the Cowboys Gone?"	Nominated
1998	40th Grammy Awards	Best Female Pop Vocal Performance	"Where Have All the Cowboys Gone?"	Nominated
1998	40th Grammy Awards	Album of the Year	This Fire	Nominated
1998	40th Grammy Awards	Best Pop Vocal Album	This Fire	Nominated
1998	40th Grammy Awards	Best New Artist	Paula Cole	Won
1998	40th Grammy Awards	Producer of the Year, Non-Classical	Paula Cole	Nominated
1998	Boston Music Awards	Act of the Year	Paula Cole	Won
1998	Boston Music Awards	Outstanding Female Vocalist	Paula Cole	Won
1998	Boston Music Awards	Single of the Year	"Where Have All The Cowboys Gone?"	Won
1998	Boston Music Awards	Outstanding Song/Songwriter	"I Don't Want To Wait"	Won
1999	Boston Music Awards	Act of the Year	Paula Cole	Nominated
1999	BMI Pop Awards	Award-Winning Song	"I Don't Want to Wait"	Won
