= Michael Woolcock =

Michael Woolcock is a leading development scholar, with a background in historical sociology who works as the World Bank's Lead Social Scientist in their Development Research Group.

== Selected publications ==
- Woolcock, M., 1998. Social capital and economic development: Toward a theoretical synthesis and policy framework. Theory and society, 27(2), pp.151-208
- Woolcock, M., 2001. The place of social capital in understanding social and economic outcomes. Canadian journal of policy research, 2(1), pp.11-17
