= Kevin Killen =

British music producer, engineer, and mixer

Kevin Killen (born October 22, 1959) is a Grammy Award-winning Irish music producer, engineer, and mixer known for his work with recording artists including U2, Peter Gabriel, Elvis Costello, Tori Amos, Kate Bush, Paula Cole, Jewel, Bon Jovi, Shawn Colvin, Shakira, Donna Lewis and David Bowie.

== Career ==
Killen was studying sciences at Trinity College in Dublin, Ireland in 1979 when a friend told him that Lombard Sound Studios was seeking a trainee. The studio hired him, and was engineering within six months. Two years later, Killen left Lombard Sound to work at Windmill Lane Studios, where he worked for the next four years. He first worked with U2 in 1982, assisting Steve Lillywhite on the band's 1983 album War. His work with U2 continued with The Unforgettable Fire, working with the production/engineering team of Brian Eno and Daniel Lanois, who Killen would again work with on Peter Gabriel's So.

In 1991, Killen co-produced and mixed the original soundtrack to the popular music film, The Commitments.

Among Killen's more recent credits include, mixing Sugarland's multi-platinum Love on the Inside featuring three chart singles in "All I Want to Do", "Already Gone" and "It Happens", all Number One hits on the Billboard country singles charts. In 2014, he mixed Suzanne Vega's Tales from the Realm of the Queen of Pentacles and recorded David Bowie's single "Sue (Or in a Season of Crime)" from his release, Nothing Has Changed.

== Awards and nominations ==
Killen was awarded five Grammys for his contributions to Shakira's 2005 album Oral Fixation, Vol. 1. He has received Grammy nominations for Best Jazz Instrumental Category for his work on Allen Toussaint's The Bright Mississippi (2009) and Best Engineered Album, Non-Classical, for Seth Glier's The Trouble With People (2012). In 2013 he received a Juno Award for recording and mixing Johnny Reid's Fire It Up CD as Best Country Album. At the 59th Annual Grammy Awards held in February 2017, Kevin was awarded a Grammy for co-producing and mixing Yo-Yo Ma & the Silk Road Ensemble’s Sing Me Home for Best World Music Album. In addition, he was awarded the Grammy Award for Best Engineered Album, Non-Classical for David Bowie's final studio album – Blackstar and a third Grammy as Blackstar took honour for Best Alternative Music Album.
