= Imago Records =

American record label

Imago Records (The Imago Recording Company) was an American independent record label, which was active during the early 1990s. It was started by Terry Ellis after he left his previous record label, Chrysalis Records.

In 1990 Ann Munday was hired as Vice President and General Manager in their New York office.

Several influential artists released albums through Imago, including Rollins Band, Aimee Mann, Paula Cole and Love Spit Love as well as alternative, gay hip-hop artist and rapper Sha-Key (aka Hanifah Walidah). Despite building a slate of up and coming alternative rock artists, the company ran into serious financial difficulties when, in December 1994, the company's former financial backer Bertelsmann Music Group pulled funding. This left many of their artists scrambling to find new labels.

In 1996, Henry Rollins and his new label DreamWorks SKG sued Imago, alleging "fraud, deceit, undue influence and economic coercion" on the label's part.

== Artists ==
All of the following artists released albums on the Imago label:

- Baby Animals
- Basehead
- Boneclub
- Captain Hollywood Project
- Paula Cole
- Doctor Rain
- Dread Zeppelin
- Eden
- Maggie Estep
- The Figgs
- Giant Sand
- Great White
- King of Fools
- Love Spit Love
- Aimee Mann
- Kylie Minogue
- Orangutang
- Pere Ubu
- Plan B
- Rollins Band
- The Sextants
- Nikolaj Steen
- John Waite
- Hanifah Walidah as Shä-Key
