= Dark Dear Heart =

Studio album by Holly Cole
- Released: 1997
- Genre: Jazz
- Length: 52:11
- Label: Alert
- Producer: Larry Klein

Holly Cole chronology
It Happened One Night (1996)	Dark Dear Heart (1997)	Treasure (1998)

Professional ratings
Review scores
Source	Rating
Allmusic	3/5 stars

Dark Dear Heart is a studio album by Holly Cole. It was released in 1997 in Canada on Alert Records.

== Track listing ==
1. "I've Just Seen a Face" (John Lennon and Paul McCartney) – 3:28
2. "Make It Go Away" (Davis, Harding) – 4:00
3. "Onion Girl" (Harding, Hull) – 4:05
4. "Dark, Dear Heart" (O'Hara) – 4:00
5. "You Want More" (Crow, Trott) – 4:32
6. "Timbuktu" (Davis, Jordan) – 3:50
7. "World Seems to Come and Go" (Piltch, White) – 5:16
8. "River" (Mitchell) – 4:44
9. "Hold On" (Batteau, Cody, Klein) – 4:33
10. "Brighter Lonely Day (Run, Run, Run)" (O'Hara) – 4:53
11. "I Told Him That My Dog Wouldn't Run" (Larkin) – 4:21
12. "All the Pretty Little Horses" (Traditional) – 4:29

== Personnel ==
- Holly Cole – vocals
- Larry Klein – organ, programming
- Jim Cox – keyboards
- Aaron Davis – keyboards
- Jon Hassell – trumpet
- Steve Tavaglione – soprano saxophone
- Kevin Breit – guitar, banjo, autoharp, loops, bazouki
- George Koller – bass
- Dean Parks – bass, guitar, electric guitar
- David Piltch – bass, guitar, mandolin
- Greg Leisz – pedal steel, electric guitar
- Helik Hadar – drums, programming, digital editing
- Iki Levy – drums, programming, loops
- Mark Kelso – drums, tambourine, vocals
- Alex Brown – background vocals
- Monalisa Young – background vocals

Production

- Larry Klein – producer
- Tom Berry – executive producer
- Leanne Ungar – engineer
- Tim Gerron – assistant engineer
- David Bryant – assistant engineer
- Denis Tougas – assistant engineer
- Greg Calbi – mastering
- Roger Moutenot – mixing
