= Temptation (Holly Cole album) =

Studio album by Holly Cole
- Released: 1995
- Genre: Jazz
- Length: 61:35
- Label: Capitol
- Producer: Craig Street

Holly Cole chronology
Don't Smoke in Bed (1993)	Temptation (1995)	It Happened One Night (1996)

Alternative Cover
- Re-release

Professional ratings
Review scores
Source	Rating
Allmusic	3.5/5 stars

Temptation is a tribute album to Tom Waits, by Holly Cole. Originally released in Canada in 1995 on Alert Records, it was also released internationally in 1995 on the Metro Blue imprint of Capitol Records.

== Track listing ==
All songs written by Tom Waits.

1. "Take Me Home" – 2:27
2. "Train Song" – 3:26
3. "Jersey Girl" – 3:45
4. "Temptation" – 3:05
5. "Falling Down" – 5:18
6. "Invitation to the Blues" – 4:23
7. "Cinny's Waltz" – 2:34
8. "Frank's Theme" – 3:10
9. "Little Boy Blue" – 2:58
10. "I Don't Wanna Grow Up" – 4:30
11. "Tango Til They're Sore" – 4:28
12. "(Looking For) The Heart of Saturday Night" – 3:37
13. "Soldiers Things" – 3:23
14. "I Want You" – 2:56
15. "Good Old World" – 1:35
16. "The Briar and the Rose" – 5:28
17. "Shiver Me Timbers" – 4:32

== Personnel ==
Musicians

- Cyro Baptista – percussion
- Anne Bourne – cello
- Dougie Bowne – drums
- Kevin Breit – guitar, national steel guitar, slide guitar
- Holly Cole – vocals
- The Colettes – background vocals
- Charles Daellenbach – tuba
- Aaron Davis – arranger, brass arrangement, piano, string arrangements
- Rhoda Dog – vocals
- Phil Dwyer – horn arrangements, alto sax, baritone sax
- Anne Lederman – violin
- Howard Levy – harmonica
- Fred Mills – trumpet
- David Ohanian – french horn
- Douglas Perry – viola
- David Piltch – arranger, bass, acoustic bass, percussion
- Ronald Romm – trumpet
- Earl Seymour – horn arrangements, baritone sax
- Eugene Watts – trombone
- Perry White – horn arrangements, tenor sax

Production

- Robin Aubé – assistant engineer
- Julian Baglioni – assistant engineer
- W. Tom Berry – executive producer
- Sandeep Bhandari – assistant engineer
- Rodney Bowes – design
- Bill Emmons – assistant engineer
- Victor Florencia – assistant engineer
- Scott James – assistant engineer
- Fred Kervorkian – assistant engineer
- Danny Kopelson – engineer
- Andrew MacNaughtan – photography
- Jo Rossi – assistant engineer
- Doug Sax – mastering
- Craig Street – producer
