= Holly Cole Collection Vol.1 =

Compilation album by Holly Cole
- Released: 2004
- Genre: Jazz
- Label: Magada Records
- Producer: Various

Holly Cole chronology
Shade (2003)	Holly Cole Collection Vol.1 (2004)	Holly Cole (2007)

Professional ratings
Review scores
Source	Rating
Allmusic	(not rated)

Holly Cole Collection Vol.1 is a compilation album by Holly Cole. Originally released in Canada in 2004 on Alert Records, it was also released internationally in 2004 on Magada Records.

== Track listing ==
1. "I Can See Clearly Now" (Johnny Nash) – 4:14
2. "Trust in Me" (Sherman/Sherman) – 4:39
3. "Jersey Girl" (Tom Waits) – 3:46
4. "Calling You" (Telson) – 4:38
5. "Too Darn Hot" (Porter) – 3:13
6. "Come Fly with Me" (Sammy Cahn, Jimmy Van Heusen) – 3:56
7. "Girl Talk" (Neal Hefti, Bobby Troup) – 4:34
8. "The Question of U" (Prince) – 3:41
9. "Make It Go Away" (Harding/Davis) – 3:56
10. "Shiver Me Timbers" (Tom Waits) – 4:35
11. "Hum Drum Blues" (Brown) – 5:36
12. "God Only Knows" (Brian Wilson, Tony Asher) – 4:28
13. "Fragile" (with Jesse Cook) (Sting) – 4:00
14. "My Foolish Heart" (Ned Washington, Victor Young) – 4:36
