= David Piltch =

Canadian bassist and session musician (born 1960)

- Born: January 29, 1960 (age 66); Toronto, Ontario, Canada
- Occupation: Musician
- Instruments: Bass guitar, double bass
- Years active: 1978–present

David Piltch (born January 29, 1960) is a Canadian bassist and session musician.

== Biography ==
Piltch grew up in an artistic family. His father Bernie Piltch was a noted studio and stage saxophonist, clarinetist and flutist in Toronto from the late '40s to the early '80s. His older brother Robert is a recording guitarist, and his sister Susan plays flute and piano.

Beginning at age 17, Piltch supported jazz musicians performing at Toronto's Bourbon Street club, including Chet Baker, Art Pepper, Zoot Sims, and Mose Allison. He also accompanied his brother or father at recording sessions and gigs.

In 1979, Piltch recorded and toured with Blood, Sweat & Tears.

In 1983, Piltch formed the trio Strangeness Beauty with Ron Allen (saxophone) and Mike Sloski (drums). Before Piltch left the trio in 1983, they recorded one album: Back to Nowhere.

In the 1980s, Piltch toured and/or recorded with Mary Margaret O'Hara, Holly Cole, and k.d. lang.

Piltch moved to southern California in 1993 to participate in more projects.

Piltch has written songs with k.d. Lang, and has produced recordings for Michael Kaeshammer and Emily Saxe.

In 2008, Piltch released the album Minister of the Interior, with guest artists k.d. lang, Bill Frisell, Petra Haden, Holly Cole, and Perla Batalla.

== Discography ==
=== Solo albums ===
- 1997: Piltch & Davis (Alert) with Aaron Davis
- 2008: Minister of the Interior (Household Ink)
- 2014: Music from the Front Room (Sticky Mack) with Larry Goldings and Jay Bellerose

=== As a member of Strangeness Beauty ===
- 1982: Back to Nowhere (C-Note 821040)

=== As a member of Blood, Sweat & Tears ===
- 1980: Nuclear Blues (MCA LAX Records)

=== With Holly Cole ===
- 1989: Christmas Blues EP (Alert)
- 1990: Girl Talk (Alert)
- 1991: Blame It on My Youth (Capitol)
- 1993: Don't Smoke in Bed (Capitol)
- 1995: Temptation (Capitol)
- 1996: It Happened One Night 6.28 (Metro Blue)
- 1997: Dark Dear Heart (Alert)
- 2000: Romantically Helpless (Alert)
- 2001: Baby, It's Cold Outside (Alert)
- 2003: Shade (Alert)
- 2007: Holly Cole (album) (Alert)
- 2012: Steal the Night: Live at the Glenn Gould Studio CD, DVD (Alert)
- 2012: Night (Universal Music Canada)
- 2020: Montreal (Rumpus Room Records)

=== With Joe Henry ===
- 2007: Civilians (ANTI-)
- 2009: Blood from Stars (ANTI-)
- 2011: Reverie (ANTI-)
- 2014: Invisible Hour (Work Song)

=== With k.d. lang ===
- 1992: Ingénue (Sire, Warner Bros.)
- 1995: All You Can Eat (Warner Bros.)
- 1997: Drag (Warner Bros.)
- 2000: Invincible Summer (Warner Bros.)
- 2004: Hymns of the 49th Parallel (Nonesuch)
- 2008: Watershed (Nonesuch)

=== With Raffi ===
- 1985: One Light, One Sun (Shoreline)
- 1987: Everything Grows (Shoreline)

=== With Fred Penner ===
- A House for Me (Shoreline)

=== As sideman ===
==== 1988 - 2005 ====
- 1988: Mary Margaret O'Hara - Miss America (Virgin)
- 1997: Janis Ian - Hunger (Windham Hill)
- 1997: Jim White - Wrong-Eyed Jesus (WEA)
- 2000: The Manhattan Transfer - The Spirit of St. Louis (Atlantic)
- 2001: Bill Frisell - Blues Dream (Nonesuch)
- 2002: Solomon Burke - Don't Give Up on Me (Fat Possum)
- 2004: The Holmes Brothers - Simple Truths (Alligator)
- 2004: Madeleine Peyroux - Careless Love (album) (Rounder / Universal)
- 2004: Sam Phillips - A Boot and a Shoe (Nonesuch)
- 2004: Jim White - Drill a Hole in That Substrate and Tell Me What You See (Luaka Bop)
- 2005: Bettye LaVette - I've Got My Own Hell to Raise (ANTI-)
- 2005: Loudon Wainwright III - Here Come the Choppers (Sovereign)
- 2005: Lizz Wright - Dreaming Wide Awake (Verve)

==== 2006 - 2009 ====
- 2006: Gnarls Barkley - St. Elsewhere (Downtown / Atlantic)
- 2006: Bruce Cockburn - Life Short Call Now (True North)
- 2006: John Legend - Once Again (GOOD Music / Sony)
- 2006: Madeleine Peyroux, Half the Perfect World (Rounder / Universal)
- 2007: Mary Gauthier - Between Daylight and Dark (Lost Highway)
- 2007: Loudon Wainwright III - Strange Weirdos (Concord)
- 2008: Rodney Crowell - Sex & Gasoline (Work Song / Yep Roc)
- 2008: Loudon Wainwright III - Recovery (Yep Roc)
- 2009: Ramblin' Jack Elliott - A Stranger Here (ANTI-)
- 2009: Salif Keita - La Différence (EmArcy)
- 2009: Allen Toussaint - The Bright Mississippi (Nonesuch)

==== 2010 - 2014 ====
- 2010: Aaron Neville - I Know I've Been Changed (Tell It)
- 2010: Mose Allison - The Way of the World (ANTI-)
- 2011: Hugh Laurie - Let Them Talk (Warner Bros.)
- 2012: Natalie D-Napoleon - Leaving Me Dry (Household Ink)
- 2012: Ana Moura - Desfado (Universal / Decca)
- 2012: Bonnie Raitt - Slipstream (Redwing)
- 2012: Luciana Souza - The Book of Chet (Sunnyside)
- 2012: Richard Thompson - Cabaret of Souls (Beeswing)
- 2013: Billy Bragg - Tooth & Nail (Cooking Vinyl)
- 2013: Robben Ford - Bringing it Back Home (Provogue)
- 2013: Elton John - The Diving Board (Capitol)
- 2013: David Myles - In The Nighttime (Turtlemusik)
- 2013: Hugh Laurie - Didn't It Rain (Warner Bros.)
- 2014: Julia Fordham - The Language of Love (Victor)

==== 2015 - present ====
- 2015: Don Henley - Cass County (Capitol)
- 2015: JD Souther - Tenderness - (Sony Masterworks)
- 2016: Hayes Carll - Lovers and Leavers (Highway 87 / Thirty Tigers)
- 2016: Bonnie Raitt - Dig In Deep (Redwing)
- 2016: Willie Nelson - Summertime: Willie Nelson Sings Gershwin (Legacy)
- 2016: Allen Toussaint - American Tunes (Nonesuch)
- 2016: Chely Wright - I Am the Rain (MRI / Sony / PaintedRed)
- 2017: Son of the Velvet Rat - Dorado (Fluff & Gravy)
- 2017: Randy Newman - Dark Matter (Nonesuch)
- 2018: Joan Baez - Whistle Down the Wind (Proper)
- 2018: Rosanne Cash - She Remembers Everything (Blue Note Records)
- 2021: Sons of Raphael – Full-Throated Messianic Homage (Because Music)
