= Don't Smoke in Bed =

Studio album by Holly Cole
- Released: 1993
- Genre: Jazz
- Length: 61:35
- Label: Capitol
- Producer: David Was

Holly Cole chronology
Blame It on My Youth (1992)	Don't Smoke in Bed (1993)	Temptation (1995)

Professional ratings
Review scores
Source	Rating
Allmusic	4/5 stars

Don't Smoke in Bed is an album by the Holly Cole Trio that draws its title from a composition by Willard Robison. Originally released in Canada in 1993 on Alert Records, the album was also released internationally in 1993 on the Manhattan imprint of Capitol Records.

== Track listing ==
1. "I Can See Clearly Now" (Johnny Nash) – 4:13
2. "Don't Let the Teardrops Rust Your Shining Heart" (Ben Watt) – 4:20
3. "Get Out of Town" (Cole Porter) – 4:43
4. "So and So" (O'Hara) – 3:27
5. "The Tennessee Waltz" (Pee Wee King, Redd Stewart) – 3:40
6. "Everyday Will Be Like a Holiday" (William Bell, Booker T. Jones) – 4:49
7. "Blame It on My Youth" (Edward Heyman, Oscar Levant) – 3:00
8. "Ev'rything I've Got" (Lorenz Hart, Richard Rodgers) – 2:55
9. "Je ne t'aime pas" (Kurt Weill, Maurice Magre) – 3:57
10. "Cry (If You Want To)" (Scott) – 2:37
11. "Que sera sera" (Ray Evans, Jay Livingston) – 4:44
12. "Don't Smoke in Bed" (Willard Robison) – 2:27

== Personnel ==
- Holly Cole – vocals
- Aaron Davis – piano
- David Piltch – bass
- Howard Levy – harmonica
- Joe Henderson – tenor saxophone (some spots on "Everyday Will Be Like a Holiday")
- David Was – producer
