= Baby, It's Cold Outside (album) =

Studio album by Holly Cole
- Released: 2001
- Studio: Inception Sound Studios & McLear Digital Studios
- Genre: Jazz
- Length: 42:55
- Label: Alert Records
- Producer: Holly Cole & Aaron Davis

Holly Cole chronology
The Best of Holly Cole (2000)	Baby, It's Cold Outside (2001)	Shade (2003)

Professional ratings
Review scores
Source	Rating
Allmusic	3/5 stars

Baby, It's Cold Outside is a Christmas album by Holly Cole. It was released in Canada in 2001 on Alert Records.

== Track listing ==
1. "Christmas Time Is Here" (Guaraldi, Mendelson) – 3:01
2. "Baby, It's Cold Outside" (Loesser) – 4:07
3. "The Christmas Song" (Torme, Wells) – 5:07
4. "Santa Baby" (Javits, Springer, Springer) – 4:00
5. "I'll Be Home for Christmas" (Gannon, Kent, Ram) – 3:08
6. "'Zat You Santa Claus" (Fox) – 3:22
7. "If We Make It Through December" (Haggard) – 3:42
8. "Christmas Is" (Faith, Maxwell) – 2:40
9. "Wildwood Carol" (Grant, Rutter) – 2:54
10. "Sleigh Ride" (Anderson, Parish) – 2:37
11. "What Is This Lovely Fragrance?" (Traditional) – 4:22
12. "Never No" (O'Hara) – 2:13
13. "What About Me" (Davis) – 1:42

== Personnel ==
- Ryan Aktari – Assistant
- Brian Barlow – Percussion, Chimes, Cymbals
- Guido Basso – Trumpet, Flugelhorn
- W. Tom Berry – Executive Producer
- Daniel Blackman – Viola
- Rodney Bowes – Package Design
- Holly Cole – Arranger, Vocals, Voices, Producer, Shaker
- Young Dae Park – Violin
- Aaron Davis – Piano, Arranger, Celeste, Conductor, Producer, Orchestral Arrangements
- Phil Demetro – Digital Editing
- Vern Dorge – Saxophone
- David Dunlop – Trumpet
- Mark Fewer – Violin
- Michael Haas – Engineer, Recording
- Fujice Imajishi – Violin
- John "Snakehips" Johnson – Saxophone, Wind
- Johnny Lee "Jaimoe" Johnson – Flute (Alto), Saxophone, Sax (Soprano), Wind Instruments
- Mark Kelso – Drums, Drums (Snare)
- Robert F. Kennedy – Clothing/Wardrobe, Make-Up, Hair Stylist, Wardrobe, Clothing Design
- Audrey King – Cello
- Debbie Kirshner – Violin
- George Koller – Bass
- Janice Lilndskoog – Harp
- Ray Luedeke – Clarinet
- Kathy MacLean – Bassoon
- Andrew MacNaughtan – Photography
- Jayne Maddison – Violin
- Gord Myers – Trombone
- Pamela Neal – Clothing/Wardrobe, Make-Up, Hair Stylist, Wardrobe, Clothing Design
- Roberto Occhipinti – Bass, String Contractor, String Coordinator
- Hyung-Sun Paik – Violin
- Gary Pattison – French Horn
- David Piltch – Bass, Percussion, Arranger
- Jasques Poirer – Engineer, Recording
- Terry Promane – Trombone
- Ed Robertson – Vocals, Voices
- Cynthia Steljes – Horn (English), Oboe
- Vera Tarnowsky – Violin
- Kent Teeple – Viola
- Camille Watts – Flute, Piccolo
- Julia Wedman – Violin
- Jeff Wolpert – Engineer, Mastering, Mixing, Recording
- Kirk Worthington – Cello
