= Blue Oil =

Musical group from Canada

Blue Oil was a punk, rock alternative band from Montreal, Quebec, Canada.The group was founded in the fall of 1978 by the sisters Christiane Fatter (guitar) and Manon Fatter (drums). With the addition of Manon Asselin, aka Nilessa Noname (bass, lead vocal) and Marie Martine Bédard (guitar), Blue Oil became, in 1981, the first all-women punk band from Québec.

== History ==
=== 1978 - 1985: Early touring and line-ups ===
Picture of the front cover of Blue Oil's first self-released vinyl single. Artwork by Michel Paul Bélisle and Wayne Kimbel 1982

Blue Oil, in its early line up, toured the college circuit and summer festivals in and around Montreal. When two of its original members, Aline Batmanian (lead vocal) and Gilles Labossière (lead guitar) left the group in 1981, Marie Martine Bédard filled in on guitar. The four girls that remained, played at indie venues in Montreal in addition to playing the "bar circuit" around the province of Québec and parts of Ontario. They wrote and recorded their own music while also playing punk covers by artists like The Ramones, The Pretenders, X-ray Spex, The Sex Pistols, Blondie, Patti Smith, The Clash among others, introducing rock top-40 listeners to the new sounds emerging from the US and the UK.

Blue Oil became a trio in 1982 with the departure of Christiane. The group then continued its relentless touring until 1985 with the technical help of Dino Bartolini, live sound engineer and Michel Paul Bélisle, show lighting creator.

=== 1986 - 1991 ===
In the post 1985 era, Marie Martine Bédard had left the band and Blue Oil introduced new members:

Marie-Christine Thiboutot (bass, 1986-1991), Cari B. Jones (keyboards, 1987–90), Mona Laviolette (guitar, 1989–91) joined the band. Manon Asselin (Nilessa) traded the bass for keyboards and guitar, as well as being Blue Oil's lead vocalist. Manon Fatter stayed on as the drummer until the end of 1991.

== Recordings, TV and documentaries ==
=== First self-release single ===
A vinyl single Money/Living for the time was self produced by the band in 1982, and copies were sold mostly at shows.

=== Alert records / Kardiak productions ===
Blue Oil was signed to Alert Records (Men Without Hats, The Box, Bündock) in 1986. An EP of 5 songs recorded at Multisons in Montreal and produced by Daniel A. Vermette, was released in 1988, with the title I blow you a kiss, as a single.

Blue Oil changed its name to Ginger Snaps during the summer of 1991.

A full self titled album, co produced by Neil O’Connor of the British band The Flys, was released by Kardiak Productions in late 1992.

=== TV / Documentaries ===
Blue Oil appeared in 1981 on Montreal’s Musi-Video cable tv show, presented by Erica Ehm and Richard Berle. They performed the songs Sardine City and Free fleas on the roof.

In 1984, the documentary On fait toutes du show-business , directed by Nicole Giguère and produced by Vidéo Femme (Québec), featured recordings and an interview with members of Blue Oil, among an array of popular Quebec’s singers and artists from the era.

In 2016, the documentary Montreal New Wave, written and directed by Erik Cimon, featured Blue Oil with an excerpt of the song Sardine City.

=== Supreme Echo Archival album (May 2023) ===
On May 26, 2023, the Canadian archival label Supreme Echo, released an album of early Blue Oil material consisting of demos and live recordings ranging from 1981 to 1983.

The songs gathered airplay in Canada (CFRU 93.3, CJSW 90,9, Radio-Canada Ohdio, CIUT, CHRW, CJLO 1690AM), the UK (Rocking Fox Radio, Punk AF Radio, Louder Than War) as well as in the USA (Sirius XM Little Stevens Underground Garage, KTEQ 91.3, Metal Kross Radio, WFMU, WHRW).
