= Holly Cole (album) =

Studio album by Holly Cole
- Released: March 20, 2007
- Genre: Jazz
- Label: Alert Records
- Producer: Greg Cohen & Holly Cole

Holly Cole chronology
Holly Cole Collection Vol.1 (2004)	Holly Cole (2007)	Steal the Night: Live at the Glenn Gould Studio (2012)

Professional ratings
Review scores
Source	Rating
Allmusic	4/5 stars

Holly Cole is a studio album by Holly Cole. It was released in Canada in 2007 on Alert Records. The title of this release was originally announced as This House is Haunted.

== Track listing ==
1. "The House Is Haunted by the Echo of Your Last Goodbye" (Basil Adlam, Billy Rose) – 4:17
2. "Charade" (Henry Mancini, Johnny Mercer) – 3:25
3. "I Will Wait for You" (Norman Gimbel, Michel Legrand) – 4:31
4. "Waters of March" (Antonio Carlos Jobim) – 4:22
5. "Alley Cat Song" (Frank Bjorn, Jack Harlen) – 4:03
6. "Larger Than Life" (Cole) – 3:37
7. "Be Careful, It's My Heart" (Irving Berlin) – 2:06
8. "It's Alright with Me" (Cole Porter) – 3:51
9. "You're My Thrill" (Sidney Clare, Jay Gorney) – 5:46
10. "Life Is Just a Bowl of Cherries" (Lew Brown, Ray Henderson) – 3:04
11. "Reaching for the Moon" (Irving Berlin) – 4:06

== Personnel ==
- Marty Ehrlich – alto saxophone (tracks 1, 2, 5, 6, 8, 9, 11)
- Robert DeBellis – baritone saxophone, bass clarinet (tracks: 3, 5, 8)
- David Piltch – bass (track 4)
- Greg Cohen – bass (tracks: 1–3, 5, 6, 8, 9, 11)
- Scott Robinson – bass saxophone (track 2)
- Steven Wolf – drums (tracks 1–3, 5, 6, 8, 9, 11)
- Vincent Chancey – French horn (tracks 1–3, 5, 8, 9, 11)
- Matt Munisteri – guitar (tracks: 1–3, 5, 8–11)
- Kevin Breit – guitar, loops (track 4)
- Aaron Davis – piano (tracks 4, 7)
- Gil Goldstein – piano (tracks 1–3, 5, 6, 8, 9, 11)
- Lenny Pickett – tenor saxophone (tracks 1, 2, 5, 8–11)
- John Allred – trombone (tracks 1–3, 5, 8–11)
- Holly Cole – vocals
