= Me and My Shadow =

1927 popular song written by Al Jolson, Billy Rose, and Dave Dreyer

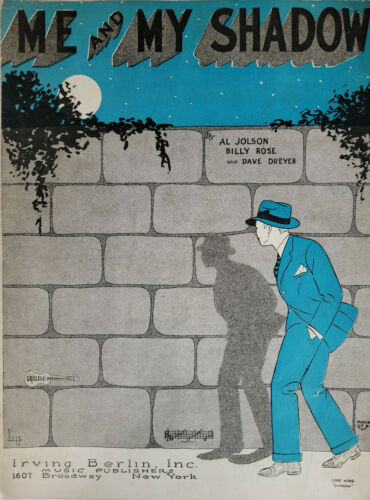
Sheet music cover, 1927

"Me and My Shadow" is a 1927 popular song published by Irving Berlin Inc. Al Jolson, Billy Rose, and Dave Dreyer are credited as the writers, with Jolson and Dreyer listed on the sheet music as responsible for the music and Rose the lyrics. Jolson was often given credits on sheet music so he could earn more by popularizing the tunes, but he played no part in writing this song. Jolson never recorded "Shadow", but in 1927, he used it in the touring version of "Big Boy".

Popular recordings in 1927 were by "Whispering" Jack Smith, Nat Shilkret (vocal by Johnny Marvin) and the separate recording by Johnny Marvin for Columbia Records. The song became especially associated with Ted Lewis, who used it to close his act. "Shadow" has since become a standard, with many artists performing it.

== Some other recorded versions ==
- Donald O'Connor (no recorded version available,
  but featured in the 1948 film Feudin', Fussin', and A-Fightin')
- Cliff Adams Singers
- Pearl Bailey
- Michael Cooney
- Michael Ball and Antonio Banderas (2003)
- Elkie Brooks
- Dave Brubeck Quartet (Instrumental) (1951)
- James Caan (from the 1975 film Funny Lady)
- Maurice Chevalier (1968)
- Holly Cole (from the 1998 album Treasure)
- Perry Como (1951)
- Bing Crosby (from the 1962 album On the Happy Side)
- Vic Damone
- Linda Eder
- Judy Garland
- Jeff Goldblum with Sarah Silverman and Till Brönner
  (from the 2018 album The Capitol Studios Sessions)
- Michele Hendricks (1990)
- Johnny Howard
- Ferlin Husky (1957)
- Bert Kaempfert
- Scrappy Lambert (1927)
- Linda Lawson (1960)
- Julie London (from the 1968 album Easy Does It)
- Peggy Lee (from the 1969 album Is That All There Is?)
- Liberace
- Mantovani
- Billy May and his orchestra (vocal: The Sportsmen) (1950)
- The Mills Brothers (1958)
- Rose Murphy (1948)
- Mandy Patinkin (1989)
- Stephanie Pope (2001)
- Lou Rawls (1965)
- Frank Sinatra and Sammy Davis Jr. (1962) -
  added special and timely lyric: "Closer than Bobby is to JFK"
- Cyril Stapleton
- Lawrence Welk
- Robbie Williams and Jonathan Wilkes (2001)
- Daniel Ash (1991 in Coming Down)
- The Kidsongs Kids on their Let's Put on a Show video and DVD.
  Solo sung by Debbie Lytton and Julene Renee.
- Sam Lanin and his Orchestra

== In film and television ==
Zelda Santley performing a mash-up of the song while impersonating Ted Lewis

In a 1929 Vitaphone Varieties short, singer Zelda Santley impersonates Lewis while singing a rendition of the song mashed-up with When My Baby Smiles at Me.

In 2010, DreamWorks began development on an animated film called Me and My Shadow. However, due to scheduling and management issues, the film was canceled.

On October 9, 2015, the song was performed on The Late Show with Stephen Colbert by host Stephen Colbert and guest James Corden.

On the October 21, 2020 episode of AEW Dynamite, the song was performed by All Elite Wrestling's Chris Jericho and MJF during their "Le Dinner Debonair" segment, with modified lyrics. Wesley Morris of The New York Times recognized the performance as one of the 'Best Performances of 2020'.
