= Girl Talk (Holly Cole album) =

Studio album by Holly Cole
- Released: 1990
- Genre: Jazz
- Length: 46:41
- Label: Alert Records
- Producer: Peter Moore

Holly Cole chronology
Christmas Blues (1989)	Girl Talk (1990)	Blame It on My Youth (1992)

Professional ratings
Review scores
Source	Rating
Allmusic	4.5/5 stars

Girl Talk is the first full-length album by Holly Cole and her trio. It was released in 1990 on Alert Records in Canada.

== Track listing ==
1. "My Foolish Heart" (Ned Washington, Victor Young) – 4:34
2. "Girl Talk" (Neal Hefti, Bobby Troup) – 4:32
3. "Talk to Me Baby" (Robert E. Dolan, Johnny Mercer) – 4:33
4. "Cruisin'" (Marvin Tarplin, Smokey Robinson) – 4:40
5. "Spring Can Really Hang You up the Most" (Fran Landesman, Tommy Wolf) – 4:40
6. "My Baby Just Cares for Me" (Walter Donaldson, Gus Kahn) – 4:25
7. "How Long Has This Been Going On?" (George Gershwin, Ira Gershwin) – 5:55
8. "I'm So Lonesome I Could Cry" (Hank Williams) – 4:24
9. "My Melancholy Baby" (Ernie Burnett, George A. Norton) – 5:03
10. "Downtown" (Tony Hatch) – 3:55

== Personnel ==
- Holly Cole - vocals
- Aaron Davis - piano
- David Piltch - double bass
- John Johnson - saxophone on "Cruisin'"
- John MacLeod - trumpet on "I'm So Lonesome I Could Cry"
