= L'Affaire Dumoutier (Say To Me...) =

1985 single by The Box

Single by The Box

from the album All the Time, All the Time, All the Time
- Language: English and French
- Released: 1985
- Genre: New wave, rock
- Length: 4:10
- Label: Alert Records
- Songwriters: The Box (Guy Pisapia, Jean Pierre Louis Joseph Brie, Jean-Marc Pisapia, Luc Papineau)
- Producers: Marc Durand, Gilles Gariépy

The Box singles chronology
"With All This Cash" (1985)	"L'Affaire Dumoutier (Say To Me...)" (1985)	"My Dreams of You" (1986)

"L'Affaire Dumoutier (Say To Me...)" is a song written and recorded by Canadian rock group The Box. It was the first single released on their 1985 album All the Time, All the Time, All the Time and was the band's first national hit.

== Background and content ==
The song takes place in the north of France and is based on a real murder trial in which the defendant was acquitted by reason of insanity due to what was described as "a strange case of split personality". Singer Jean-Marc Pisapia said in an interview with Spill magazine: "You didn't hear much of these cases in those years, I think it was one of the first times that someone convicted of such a horrible murder would be found not guilty on the basis of mental illness."

The song features Pisapia narrating the story and singing the chorus in English, interspersed with commentary from the trial participants in French. Vocalists Josée Blondin and Sass Jordan provide backing vocals.

The Box pressured their record label into releasing "L'Affaire Dumoutier" as the lead single from their 1985 album All the Time, All the Time, All the Time. The label had doubts that the single would succeed commercially, due to its dark true-crime theme and the inclusion of French dialogue that could be difficult for many Canadian listeners to understand. The song gained popularity nationally after its music video began receiving regular airplay on MuchMusic and its French‑language sister station MusiquePlus, exposing it to both anglophone and francophone audiences. Directed by Jean‑Marc Pisapia and videographer Roy Pike, the video was filmed in a film noir style, with Pisapia playing the police detective investigating the murder, and each member of the band playing various roles in the trial.

The song did, however, face some early resistance from radio programmers in English Canada, although it received strong support from Toronto's CFNY-FM, as well as in bilingual regions like Ottawa, Winnipeg, Northeastern Ontario and New Brunswick; this, combined with the video's popularity on MuchMusic, ultimately helped the song overcome its initial lack of radio support.

"L'Affaire Dumoutier" is part of a series of three songs about the same story, the other two being "For the First and Very Last" and "The Evil in Me." "The Evil in Me" was also on the album All the Time, All the Time, All the Time, and all three songs were released together as a 12-inch single called The Story of Austin: A Trilogy. "For the First and Very Last", although not on the original pressing of the album, was included when the album was reissued on contemporary music streaming platforms.

== Awards and recognition ==
L'Affaire Dumoutier became the Box's first national hit. It peaked at No. 21 on RPM singles chart, and No. 2 on RPM's Top Cancon singles chart.

The song's success helped The Box earn the title of Quebec's Group of the Year at the 1985 Félix Awards. That same year, they were nominated for a Juno Award for Most Promising New Group and received a CASBY nomination for Single of the Year. The music video was nominated for Videoclip of the Year at the 1986 Félix Awards.

When Pisapia gave up rock music for a time in the 1990s to devote himself to writing advertising jingles for television, he named his production company L'Affaire Dumoutier.

In 2017, Pisapia referred to "L'Affaire Dumoutier" as a "once in a career" song. In 2024, in an interview previewing the band's live performance at that year's Festival d'été de Québec, Pisapia told Cédric Bélanger of Le Journal de Québec that he still considers it the best song he ever wrote.
