= Steal the Night: Live at the Glenn Gould Studio =

Live album by Holly Cole
- Released: February 2012
- Recorded: August 2011
- Genre: Jazz
- Length: CD (38:26) DVD (48:46)
- Label: Alert
- Producer: Tim Martin

Holly Cole chronology
Holly Cole (2007)	Steal the Night: Live at the Glenn Gould Studio (2012)	Night (2012)

Steal the Night is a live CD/DVD by Canadian jazz singer Holly Cole that was released in 2012 in Canada by Alert Records. This is her first live DVD release. It was recorded at Glenn Gould Studio in Toronto on August 11, 2011. The performance marked the reformation of the Holly Cole Trio with Aaron Davis on piano and David Piltch on bass, in addition to John Johnson (horns), Rob Piltch (guitar), and David DiRenzo (drums).

== Track listing ==
CD

1. "Down, Down, Down" (Tom Waits) – 3:52
2. "Smile" (Charlie Chaplin) – 4:24
3. "Charade" (Henry Mancini, Johnny Mercer) – 3:54
4. "Good Time Charlie" (Danny O'Keefe) – 4:04
5. "Larger Than Life" (Holly Cole) – 4:23
6. "Calling You" (Robert Eria Telson) – 4:24
7. "Cry (If You Want To)" (Casey Scott) – 3:55
8. "You've Got A Secret" (Holly Cole) – 5:01
9. "I Can See Clearly Now" (Johnny Nash) – 4:40

DVD

1. "Charade" (Henry Mancini, Johnny Mercer)
2. "Good Time Charlie" (Danny O'Keefe)
3. "Cry (If You Want To)" (Casey Scott)
4. "Calling You" (Robert Eria Telson)
5. "Down Down Down" (Tom Waits)
6. "Smile" (Charlie Chaplin)
7. "Larger Than Life" (Holly Cole)
8. "Train Song" (Tom Waits)
9. "Tea For Two" (Irving Caesar, Vincent Youmans)
10. "You've Got A Secret" (Holly Cole)
11. "I Can See Clearly Now" (Johnny Nash)

Bonus Track "I'd Like You For Christmas" (Bobby Troup)
