= Shade (Holly Cole album) =

Studio album by Holly Cole
- Released: 2003
- Genre: Jazz
- Label: Alert Records

Holly Cole chronology
Baby, It's Cold Outside (2001)	Shade (2003)	Holly Cole Collection Vol.1 (2004)

Professional ratings
Review scores
Source	Rating
Allmusic	4.5/5 stars

Shade is a studio album by Holly Cole. It was released in Canada in 2003 on Alert Records.

== Track listing ==
1. "Heatwave" (Berlin) – 3:40
2. "Something Cool" (Barnes) – 3:58
3. "Too Darn Hot" (Porter) – 3:13
4. "God Only Knows" (Asher, Wilson) – 4:27
5. "A Cottage for Sale" (Conley, Robison) – 3:43
6. "We Kiss in a Shadow" (Hammerstein, Rodgers) – 2:26
7. "It Never Entered My Mind" (Hart, Rodgers) – 4:26
8. "Manhattan" (Hart, Rodgers) – 3:58
9. "Moonglow" (DeLange, Hudson, Mills) – 4:21
10. "Almost Like Being in Love" (Lerner, Loewe) – 4:03
11. "Midnight Sun" (Burke, Hampton, Mercer) – 5:14
12. "Lazy Afternoon" (Latouche, Moross) – 3:07

== Personnel ==
- David Piltch – bass
- George Koller – bass
- Mark Kelso – drums, bongos, percussion
- Johnny Johnson – flute, alto saxophone, tenor saxophone, bass clarinet
- Dylan Heming – organ
- Davide Direnzo – bongos
- Aaron Davis – piano
- Terry Promane – tenor trombone, bass trombone
- Kevin Breit – guitar, loops, mandolin
- Guido Basso – trumpet, flugelhorn
- Holly Cole – vocals, xylophone, glockenspiel
