= Ordinary People (The Box song) =

Single by The Box

from the album Closer Together
- Released: 1987
- Recorded: 1986
- Genre: New wave, rock, progressive rock
- Length: 3:51
- Label: Alert
- Songwriter: Jean-Marc Pisapia
- Producers: Marc Durand and The Box

The Box singles chronology
"Closer Together" (1987)	"Ordinary People" (1987)	"Crying Out Loud for Love" (1987)

"Ordinary People" is a song written by Jean-Marc Pisapia, and recorded by Canadian new wave group The Box. It was released in July 1987 as the second single from their album Closer Together, and peaked at #16 in the RPM charts.

== Content and controversy ==
The song's theme created some controversy at the time of its release due to its Cold War and political themes, and for combining the American and Soviet national anthems during the instrumental break.

Some music critics chafed at the idea that the song was recorded by a French-Canadian band, despite the song's opening and closing line referencing both the United States and Soviet Union.

According to Pisapia, the song's content labelled them a politically oriented band, which wasn't the case. He was inspired to write the song after hostile events taking place around the world at the time. Pisapia cleared up any hints that the song was politically motivated, stating that regardless of what side of the world they lived on, they are all ordinary people who don't care about political issues and stances and just want to live in peace.

Pisapia directed the music video for the single, which garnered him a nomination for Best Video at the 1989 Juno Awards.
