= Christmas Blues =

EP by Holly Cole
- Released: 1989
- Recorded: Inception Sound
- Genre: Jazz
- Length: 11:48
- Label: Alert
- Producer: Holly Cole Trio

Holly Cole chronology
Christmas Blues (1989)	Girl Talk (1990)

Christmas Blues is an EP, the first recording by the Holly Cole Trio. It was released in 1989 on Alert Records in Canada. It is notable for the Jazz cover of The Pretenders' "2,000 Miles"

== Track listing ==
1. "The Christmas Blues" (Sammy Cahn, David Jack Holt) – 2:54
2. "Two Thousand Miles" (Chrissie Hynde) – 3:32
3. "Please Come Home for Christmas" (Brown, Redd) – 3:04
4. "I'd Like to Hitch a Ride With Santa Claus" (Burke, VanHeusen) – 2:18

== Personnel ==
- Holly Cole – Vocals
- Aaron Davis – Piano
- David Piltch – Bass

== Year-end charts ==
Chart (2001)	Position
Canadian (Nielsen SoundScan)	138
