= I Want to Believe =

I Want to Believe may refer to:

- "I Want to Believe", song by New Found Glory from Kill It Live, 2013
- "I Want to Believe", song by Sass Jordan from Racine, 1992
- The X-Files: I Want to Believe, or more generally the slogan popularized by the TV series via a prominently-displayed poster in special agent Fox Mulder's office

== See also ==
- "I Wanna Believe", song by Patty Loveless from On Your Way Home, 2003
