= Treasure (Holly Cole album) =

Compilation album by Holly Cole
- Released: 1998
- Recorded: 1989–1998
- Genre: Jazz
- Length: 52.00
- Label: Alert Records
- Producer: Various

Holly Cole chronology
Dark Dear Heart (1997)	Treasure (1998)	Romantically Helpless (2000)

Professional ratings
Review scores
Source	Rating
Allmusic	3/5 stars

Treasure is a limited edition compilation album by Holly Cole Trio. It was released in Canada in 1998 on Alert Records. It is a collection of "Hits and Previously Unreleased Tracks" from 1989 to 1993. However, the sleeve notes concede that Last Rose Of Summer dates from January 1995 but "it is one of Holly's favourites". There are six previously released tracks and eight previously unreleased recordings.

== Critical reception ==
Heather Phares of AllMusic writes, "Though this collection doesn't attempt to be as complete as Blue Note's The Best of Holly Cole, Treasure 1989-1993 does offer a nice sampling of work from Cole's early years."

== Track listing ==
No.	Title	Writer(s)	Length
1.	"The Man I Love" (* live)	George Gershwin; Ira Gershwin	4:48
2.	"Girl Talk"	Neal Hefti; Bobby Troup	4:37
3.	"Talk to Me Baby"	Johnny Mercer; Robert E. Dolan	4:35
4.	"Trust in Me"	Robert B. Sherman; Richard M. Sherman	4.02
5.	"On a Slow Boat to China" (*)	Frank Loesser	2:14
6.	"Calling You"	Bob Telson	4:36
7.	"Cry (If You Want To)"	Casey Scott	2:40
8.	"Me and My Shadow" (*)	Al Jolson; Dave Dreyer; Billy Rose	4:06
9.	"I Can See Clearly Now"	Johnny Nash	4:14
10.	"Alison" (*)	Elvis Costello	3:29
11.	"Last Rose of Summer" (*)	Tom Waits	2:15
12.	"Tea for Two" (**)	Caesar; Youmans	2:48
13.	"Christmas Trees and Holly Leaves" (**)	Mary Margaret O'Hara	3:34
14.	"Someone to Watch Over Me" (* live)	George Gershwin; Ira Gershwin	4.02
Total length:			50:00

* Previously Unreleased
** New recording

Track information and credits adapted from the album's liner notes.

== Musicians ==
- Holly Cole – Arranger (tracks 1–14), Vocals (tracks 1–13)
- David Piltch – Arranger (tracks 1–11, 13–14), Bass (tracks 1–11), Percussion (tracks 9–10)
- Aaron Davis – Arranger(tracks 1–11, 13–14), Organ (track 13), Piano (tracks 1–11, 13)
- Mark Kelso – Drums (track 13), Hi Hat (track 12)
- George Koller – Bass (tracks 12–13)
- Kim Ratcliffe – Guitars (track 13)

== Production ==
- Holly Cole – Producer
- Greg Cohen – Producer
- Craig Street – Producer
- David Was – Producer
- Peter Moore – Engineer, Mixing, Producer
- Danny Kopelson – Engineer, Mixing
- Joe Ferla – Engineer, Mixing
- George Graves – Remastering
- Scott Murley – Remastering
- Jeff Wolpert – Engineer, Mixing, Remastering
- Leanne Ungar – Engineer, Mixing
- Rodney Bowes – Package Design
- Andrew MacNaughtan – Photography
