= The Best of Holly Cole =

Greatest hits album by Holly Cole
- Released: 2000
- Genre: Jazz
- Label: Blue Note
- Producer: Various

Holly Cole chronology
Romantically Helpless (2000)	The Best of Holly Cole (2000)	Baby, It's Cold Outside (2001)

Professional ratings
Review scores
Source	Rating
Allmusic	3/5 stars
All About Jazz	

The Best of Holly Cole is a compilation album by Holly Cole. It was released in the US in 2000 on Blue Note Records.

== Track listing ==
1. "Trust in Me" (Sherman) – 3:24
2. "Calling You" (Telson) – 4:40
3. "God Will" (Lovett) – 3:12
4. "Blame It on My Youth" (Heyman, Levant) – 3:02
5. "I Can See Clearly Now" (Johnny Nash) – 4:14
6. "Don't Let the Teardrops Rust Your Shining Heart" (Watt) – 4:20
7. "Cry (If You Want To)" (Scott) – 2:38
8. "Jersey Girl" (Tom Waits) – 3:46
9. "Train Song [live]" (Waits) – 3:33
10. "I Want You" (Waits) – 2:58
11. "Make It Go Away" (Davis, Harding) – 4:01
12. "I've Just Seen a Face" (John Lennon, Paul McCartney) – 3:29
13. "Alison" (Elvis Costello) – 3:23
