= Blame It on My Youth (Holly Cole Trio album) =

Blame It On My Youth

Studio album by Holly Cole
- Released: 1991 (Canada); 1992 (US)
- Recorded: June–July 1991
- Studios: Eastern Sound, Toronto
- Genre: Jazz
- Length: 37:45
- Label: Capitol
- Producer: Greg Cohen

Holly Cole chronology
Girl Talk (1990)	Blame It On My Youth (1991)	Don't Smoke in Bed (1993)

Professional ratings
Review scores
Source	Rating
Allmusic	3/5 stars

Blame It On My Youth is an album by the Holly Cole Trio. Originally released in Canada in 1991 on Alert Records, it was subsequently released internationally in 1992 on the Manhattan imprint of Capitol Records.

== Track listing ==
1. "Trust in Me" (Robert B. Sherman, Richard M. Sherman) – 3:23
2. "I'm Gonna Laugh You Right out of My Life" (Cy Coleman, Joseph McCarthy) – 2:37
3. "If I Were a Bell" (Frank Loesser) – 2:17
4. "Smile" (Charlie Chaplin, Geoffrey Parsons, John Turner) – 4:13
5. "Purple Avenue" (Tom Waits) – 3:57
6. "Calling You" (Bob Telson) – 4:38
7. "God Will" (Lyle Lovett) – 3:11
8. "On the Street Where You Live" (Alan Jay Lerner, Frederick Loewe) – 5:33
9. "Honeysuckle Rose" (Andy Razaf, Fats Waller) – 2:20
10. "I'll Be Seeing You" (Sammy Fain, Irving Kahal) – 5:54

== Personnel ==
- Holly Cole – vocals
- Aaron Davis – piano
- David Piltch – bass
- Johnny Frigo – violin in "Honeysuckle Rose" and "If I Were a Bell"
- Robert W. Stevenson – bass clarinet in "On the Street Where You Live"
