= It Happened One Night (album) =

It Happened One Night 6.28

Live album by Holly Cole
- Released: 1996
- Recorded: June 28, 1995
- Genre: Jazz
- Length: 39:02
- Label: Metro Blue

Holly Cole chronology
Temptation (1995)	It Happened One Night 6.28 (1996)	Dark Dear Heart (1997)

Professional ratings
Review scores
Source	Rating
Allmusic	4/5 stars

It Happened One Night 6.28 is a live album by Holly Cole. Originally released in Canada in 1996 on Alert Records, it was also released in 1996 on the Metro Blue imprint of Capitol Records. It was recorded on June 28, 1995 at the St. Denis Theatre in Montreal, PQ. The album was originally released as an Enhanced CD and included QuickTime video content playable on both Macintosh and Windows computers.

== Track listing ==
1. "Get Out of Town" (Porter) – 5:15
2. "Cry (If You Want To)" (Scott) – 3:15
3. "Train Song" (Tom Waits) – 3:31
4. "Losing My Mind" (Sondheim) – 5:48
5. "Tango Til They're Sore" (Tom Waits) – 5:00
6. "Don't Let the Teardrops Rust Your Shining Heart" (Watt) – 5:01
7. "Que Sera Sera" (Evans, Livingston) – 5:43
8. "Calling You" (Telson) – 5:29

== Enhanced CD content ==
The Enhanced CD portion consisted of an interactive media presentation including pictures, audio and video interviews, music videos. and live performance video recordings.

Music videos:

- "Calling You"
- "I Can See Clearly Now"

Live performances:

- "Cry (If You Want To)"
- "Little By Blue"
- "Que Sera, Sera"
- "Train Song"

== Personnel ==
- Vocals: Holly Cole
- Piano: Aaron Davis
- Bass: David Piltch
- Guitar: Kevin Breit
- Drums & percussion: Dougie Bowne
