= Kevin Breit =

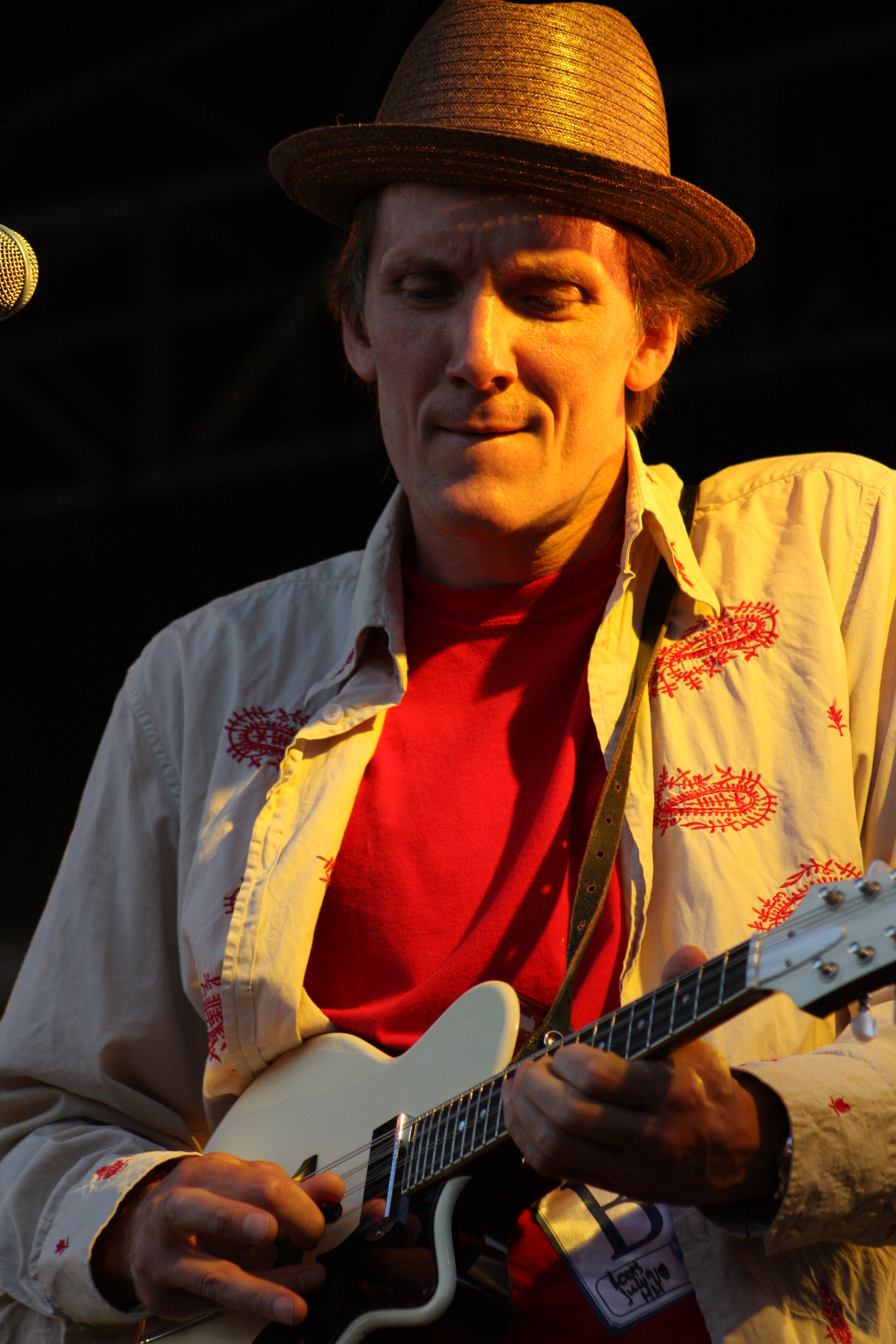
- Bluesfest 2008, Ottawa, Canada

Background information
- Born: McKerrow (Baldwin, Ontario), Canada
- Origin: Ontario, Canada
- Genres: Jazz, folk, Americana
- Occupation: Musician
- Instruments: Guitar, mandolin
- Years active: 1980’s—present
- Labels: Poverty Playlist, Stony Plain
- Website: kevinbreit.com

Kevin Breit is a Canadian musician. Breit has collaborated in numerous bands and recorded albums as a leader. He has won a Juno Award.

== Projects ==
Breit is the leader of the quartet Sisters Euclid, comprising Breit, Ian DeSouza, Gary Taylor and Rob Gusevs. Sisters Euclid earned a Juno Award in 2007. In 2006, they released an instrumental jazz fusion album of Neil Young songs entitled Run Neil Run.

Breit is a member of The Stretch Orchestra with fellow "quite tall" musicians Matt Brubeck and drummer Jesse Stewart. Their self-titled recording won a Juno Award in 2012 for Best Instrumental Album.

Breit is a member of the folk group Folkalarm.

Breit is part of the Neon Eagle band which played at The Rex, a jazz club located in Toronto, in 2023. He has played and toured with musicians such as Cassandra Wilson, Holly Cole, and Norah Jones.

== Discography ==
- Maybelle (Poverty Playlist, 1998)
- Empty (Poverty Playlist, 1998)
- Folkalarm (Poverty Playlist, 1998)
- Supergenerous (Blue Note, 2000)
- Jubilee with Harry Manx (NorthernBlues Music, 2003)
- Skedaddle (Poverty Playlist, 2003)
- Burnt Bulb on Broadway (Poverty Playlist, 2005)
- In Good We Trust with Harry Manx (Stony Plain, 2007)
- Sao Paulo Slim with Cyro Baptista (Out of My Mind Music, 2008)
- Simple Earnest Plea (Poverty Playlist, 2011)
- Strictly Whatever with Harry Manx (Stony Plain, 2011)
- Field Recording (Poverty Playlist, 2013)
- Ernesto and Delilah with Rebecca Jenkins (Poverty Playlist, 2015)
- Johnny Goldtooth and the Chevy Casanovas (Stony Plain, 2017)
- Stella Bella Strada (Stony Plain, 2019)
- Yearning Soul Rebellion (2022)
- Breit Workman with Hawksley Workman (2022)

=== As guest ===
- 1995 Just Your Fool, Carlos del Junco Band (BRRCD-1)
- 1996 New Moon Daughter, Cassandra Wilson – (Blue Note)
- 1999 Traveling Miles, Cassandra Wilson – (Blue Note)
- 2000 Romantically Helpless, Holly Cole – (Alert Records)
- 2002 Come Away with Me, Norah Jones (Blue Note)
- 2003 Shade (Holly Cole album), (Alert Records)
- 2003 Johnny's Blues: A Tribute to Johnny Cash, (Northern Blues)
- 2004 Feels Like Home, Norah Jones (Blue Note)
- 2004 Live in 2004, Norah Jones and the Handsome Band (Blue Note)

–
