= Night (Holly Cole album) =

Studio album by Holly Cole
- Released: July 31, 2012
- Genre: Jazz
- Length: 40:12
- Labels: Universal Music Canada / Tradition & Moderne

Holly Cole chronology
Steal the Night: Live at the Glenn Gould Studio (2012)	Night (2012)

Night is a studio album by Holly Cole released in July 2012 on the Tradition & Moderne label in Germany, and in November 2012 on Universal Music in Canada. Night is the first studio album from Holly Cole since a 2007 self-titled release. The album features pianist Aaron Davis, bassists David Piltch and Greg Cohen, drummer Davide DiRenzo, lap steel guitarist Greg Leisz, guitarist Kevin Breit, percussionist Cyro Baptista and Johnny Johnson on horns. The album's fifth track is a cover of Elvis Presley's 'Viva Las Vegas'. Cole's other covers on the album include Tom Waits's "Walk Away" and Captain Beefheart's "Love Lies".

== Track listing ==
No.	Title	Length
1.	"You Only Live Twice"	3:17
2.	"Walk Away"	3:40
3.	"Good Time Charlie's Got the Blues"	3:11
4.	"You've Got a Secret"	4:34
5.	"Viva Las Vegas"	4:06
6.	"I Only Have Eyes for You"	3:28
7.	"Love Lies"	3:56
8.	"I Thought of You Again"	3:31
9.	"Whistlin' Past the Graveyard"	3:09
10.	"If You Go Away"	3:26
11.	"If You Could Read My Mind"	3:54
