= Romantically Helpless =

Studio album by Holly Cole
- Released: 2000
- Genre: Jazz
- Label: Alert Records
- Producer: Stephen Ferrera

Holly Cole chronology
Treasure (1989-1993) (1998)	Romantically Helpless (2000)	The Best of Holly Cole (2000)

Professional ratings
Review scores
Source	Rating
Allmusic	4/5 stars
All About Jazz	

Romantically Helpless is a studio album by Holly Cole. It was released in Canada in 2000 on Alert Records and mastered as an HDCD encoded CD.

== Track listing ==
1. "One-Trick Pony" (Paul Simon) – 4:41
2. "Romantically Helpless" (David Piltch) – 3:31
3. "I'll Be Here" (David Baerwald, David Piltch) – 4:36
4. "Ghosts" (Randy Newman) – 2:11
5. "Come Fly with Me" (Sammy Cahn, Jimmy Van Heusen) – 3:55
6. "Dedicated to the One I Love" (Ralph Bass, Lowman Pauling) – 2:53
7. "That Old Black Magic" (Harold Arlen, Johnny Mercer) – 3:26
8. "If I Start to Cry" (Laura Harding, Jeff Hull) – 4:01
9. "Loving You" (Stephen Sondheim) – 3:00
10. "Make It Go Away" (Aaron Davis, Laura Harding) – 3:57
11. "Don't Fence Me In" (Robert Fletcher, Cole Porter) – 3:16
12. "Same Girl" (Randy Newman) – 3:29

== Personnel ==
- Tory Cassis - backing vocals
- David Piltch - bass
- George Koller - bass
- Mark Kelso - drums
- Dave Gray - guitar
- Kevin Breit - guitar
- Kim Ratcliffe - guitar
- Luc Boivin - percussion
- Aaron Davis - piano, organ, synthesizer
- Mark Ferguson - trombone
- Holly Cole - vocals

== Production ==
- Stephen Ferrera - producer
- Bob Ludwig - mastering
- Kevin Killen - mixing
- Jeff Wolpert - engineer
