= Leon Cole =

Canadian musician and radio broadcaster (1939–2019)

Leon Allen Cole (December 29, 1939 - December 5, 2019) was a Canadian musician and radio broadcaster, best known as the host of the classical music program RSVP on CBC Stereo from 1985 to 1995.

Prior to joining the CBC as a broadcaster, Cole studied music at the Royal Conservatory of Music and the University of Toronto. He worked as a church organist and choir director, as well as composing orchestral music and documentary film scores. He was first heard on the CBC as the host of Sound Track, before taking over from David Lennick as host of RSVP in 1985.

He was the father of jazz singer Holly Cole.
