= Rats (album) =

Studio album by Sass Jordan
- Released: March 1994
- Genres: Hard rock, rock
- Length: 44:40
- Label: Aquarius
- Producer: Nick DiDia

Sass Jordan chronology
Racine (1992)	Rats (1994)	Present (1997)

Rats is the third studio album by Canadian rock singer/songwriter Sass Jordan, released on Aquarius Records (Canada) March 1994. Jordan described the album as a reflection on her experiences having been in a romantic relationship with a heroin addict.

Professional ratings
Review scores
Source	Rating
AllMusic	4/5 stars
Music Week	3/5 stars

== Track listing ==
No.	Title	Writer(s)	Length
1.	"Damaged"	Sass Jordan, Stevie Salas	3:18
2.	"Slave"	Jordan, Salas	3:35
3.	"Pissing Down"	Jordan, Salas	5:20
4.	"High Road Easy"	Jordan, Salas	4:01
5.	"Sun's Gonna Rise"	Jordan, Salas	2:53
6.	"Head"	Jordan, Salas	4:16
7.	"Ugly"	Jordan, Salas	3:23
8.	"I'm Not"	Jordan, Salas	4:38
9.	"Honey"	Jordan, Salas	4:06
10.	"Wish"	Jordan, Salas	3:37
11.	"Breakin'"	Jordan, Salas	2:40
12.	"Give"	Jordan, Tony Reyes	3:39

== Critical response ==
Nick Krewen of the Hamilton Spectator wrote that Jordan "has dumped a load of gravel and guitars into Rats, which launches her past most of her peers in the male- dominated world of serious hard rock," and said that it was "the first album to show her true potential."

For the Ottawa Citizen, Lynn Saxberg wrote that "Rats is not for the faint of heart. Musically, it's Jordan's most aggressive workout, but there's a sure sense of melody and the singer's impassioned delivery to keep you hooked. Only one song, Honey , a run-of-the-mill formula rocker, misses the mark."

== Personnel ==
Band

- Sass Jordan – lead vocals, bass, producer, backing vocals
- Stevie Salas – bass, electric guitar, mixing, producer, string arrangements, acoustic guitar, backing vocals
- Ian Moore – electric guitar, slide guitar, backing vocals
- Carmine Rojas – bass
- Brian Tichy – drums
- Rei Atsumi – Mellotron, Hammond organ, piano
- Tal Bergman – percussion
- George Clinton – talking, backing vocals
- Allen Kamai – bass
- Jamie Wood – harmonica
- Vince Ruby – backing vocals
- Tony Reyes – bass, acoustic guitar, backing vocals
- Tom Petersson – bass
- Michael Page – bass
- Johan Langlie Orchestra – strings
- Richie Kotzen – backing vocals

Technical

- Nick DiDia – Engineer, Mixing, Producer, String Arrangements
- Stephen Marcussen – mastering
- Jeanne Bradshaw – design and cover art
- Caroline Greyshock – photography
- Karen Dusenberry – Clothing/Wardrobe
- Pat Dorn – Coordination
