= Jean-Marc Pisapia =

Canadian musician (born 1957)

- Born: 13 November 1957 (age 68); Montreal, Quebec, Canada
- Genres: New wave; rock; progressive rock
- Occupations: Singer-songwriter; keyboardist; director
- Instrument: Keyboards
- Years active: 1981–present
- Member of: The Box

Jean-Marc Pisapia (born 13 November 1957) is a Canadian singer-songwriter and director. He is best known as the frontman of the new wave band The Box. As a director, he was nominated for Best Video at the 1989 Juno Awards.

== Early life ==
Born in Montreal, Pisapia learned piano from the age of four and grew up listening to progressive rock. He went to high school with musicians Ivan Doroschuk of Men Without Hats and Pascal Languirand of Trans-X and went on to study architecture at University of Montreal.

Pisapia's father immigrated to Canada from Naples, Italy in 1952. Pisapia has two brothers, Guy and Serge, and a sister, Christine. His older brother, Guy, was the keyboardist for the first iteration of The Box.

== Career ==
In 1981, Men Without Hats frontman Ivan Doroschuk invited Pisapia to be a keyboardist on their summer tour. That same year, Pisapia formed a band, originally called Checkpoint Charlie, which was renamed The Box.

Pisapia serves as The Box's lead vocalist and principal lyricist. He also directed several of The Box's videos. In 1990, while directing the video for their single Temptation in New Orleans, he fell off a moving truck and broke his collarbone in two places. Concerned about the money that the band would lose by being unable to complete the video shoot, he returned to work on it that same night. His work on the video for the band's single, "Ordinary People", earned him a nomination for Best Video at the 1989 Juno Awards.

After The Box's dissolution in 1992, Pisapia collaborated with bandmates Jean-Pierre Brie and Claude Thibault in writing and producing music for TV and radio commercials. Pisapia later formed his own music production company, which he named L'Affaire Dumoutier, after The Box's first hit single. Pisapia wrote and performed music for ad campaigns for such clients as Bell Canada, McDonald's, and General Motors.

While Pisapia's first language is French, he prefers performing in English. He told the Toronto Star in 1986: "A lot of people sing rock in French and it seems to work very well for them. I wouldn't say it's written in the stars that you can't (sing pop in French), but that's my personal belief." He also told the paper in 1987 that he was a proponent of "international pop culture," and pointed out that popular artists of the time, such as the Norwegian band A-ha and the Austrian musician Falco, also produced music in English.

Pisapia reformed The Box with an entirely new roster of musicians that he met in the film industry and they released their first album in 2005. The new iteration performs songs in a progressive rock style.

== Personal life ==
Pisapia started painting in 2009 after moving from Montreal to a rural area of Quebec known as the Laurentides. He joined a collective of artists and opened two art galleries in Mont-Tremblant.

Pisapia has two daughters.
