= Sass Jordan =

Canadian rock singer-songwriter (1962–2026)

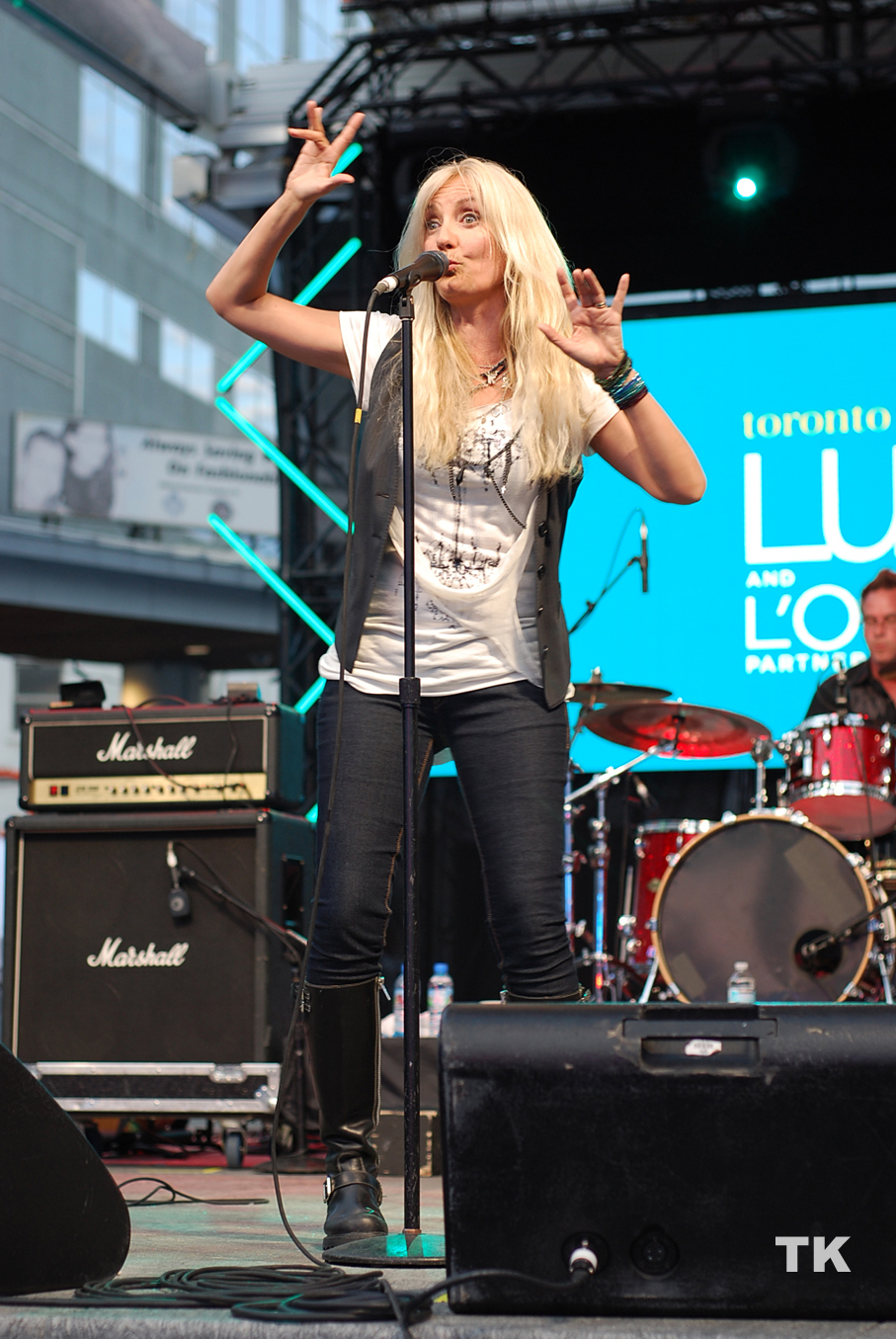
- Jordan performing in 2010

Background information
- Born: Sarah Jordan; 23 December 1960; Birmingham, England
- Origin: Montreal, Quebec, Canada
- Died: 2 October 2026 (aged 65) Montreal, Quebec, Canada
- Genre: Rock
- Occupations: Singer; actress; television personality
- Instruments: Vocals; bass guitar
- Years active: 1982–2026
- Labels: Aquarius; MapleMusic Recordings; Impact; True North; Stony Plain
- Spouse: Derek Sharp
- Website: sassjordan.com

Sarah "Sass" Jordan (23 December 1960 – 2 October 2026) was a Canadian rock singer. Her first single, "Tell Somebody," from her debut album of the same title, won the Juno Award for Most Promising Female Vocalist in 1989. Based on her 1992 album Racine she was Billboard's top female rock artist of the year for 1992. Subsequently, she was nominated three more times for Juno Awards. Her 2020 album Rebel Moon Blues hit number five on the Billboard Blues chart. Outside of the music industry, she also acted in television roles. For six seasons, she was a judge on the Canadian Idol television show, until she returned to her music career exclusively in 2009. Her 2023 live album, based upon her 1994 tour with Taylor Hawkins on drums, called Live in New York Ninety-Four, was her final release. She abruptly stopped touring in September 2026 due to undisclosed medical issues, less than a month before her death.

== Early life, family and education ==
Jordan was born in Birmingham, England on 23 December 1960, to French literary professor Albert Jordan and English former ballerina Jean Lanceman. When Jordan was three years old, the family moved from France to Canada when her father took a position as a professor at Concordia University in Montreal, Quebec.

In her early teens, Jordan regularly sang and played guitar with a group of friends in Westmount Park. By the age of 16, Sass Jordan began performing with bands at clubs in downtown Montreal, eventually becoming a vocalist/bassist for high-profile local band The Pinups. In 1986, Jordan made her recording debut on the Bündock album Mauve as co-lead vocalist on the song "Come On (Baby Tonight)". She soon began working as a session vocalist for other Montreal-based acts, notably for the Box, including on their breakthrough hit "L'Affaire Dumoutier (Say To Me...)". Jordan acted the part of a vocalist in the music video for The Box song "Closer Together", but the vocals were recorded by Martine St. Clair. Local acts began recording songs written by Jordan, including the Canadian hit single "Rain" by Michael Breen, which was featured on his 1987 self-titled album.

== Musical influences ==
Jordan was first inspired to pursue music after hearing The Band's 1969 track "The Night They Drove Old Dixie Down" on the radio. Jordan's parents only had classical music in the house, and she described hearing The Band on the radio as a "revelation." She cited Rod Stewart, Judas Priest, Ozzy Osbourne, David Bowie, Tears For Fears, Anthrax, and American soul singer Al Green as among her musical influences. She said that her biggest influences were male singers such as Steven Tyler, Robert Palmer and Paul Rodgers.

== Recording career ==
=== Early career: 1988–1995 ===
Jordan's debut album, Tell Somebody, was released in 1988 on Atlantic Records, featuring the Canadian chart hit singles "Tell Somebody", "Double Trouble," "Stranger Than Paradise," and "So Hard." "They played the "Tell Somebody" video on Much Music a lot," said Jordan. "I remember going in two weeks from relative obscurity to being recognized as the girl in the video." During the 1988–89 chart run of "So Hard," Jordan was also represented on the Canadian charts with her remake of the 1965 R&B classic "Rescue Me," which had been recorded for the soundtrack of the film American Boyfriends. As a result of her quick rise to fame, Jordan relocated from Montreal to Los Angeles in January 1990 to try breaking into the American music market.

Jordan's second album, Racine, was released in 1992 on MCA Records. Recorded in Los Angeles, Racine is Jordan's highest-selling album, with global sales estimated at 450,000 copies, and yielded the Canadian hit singles "Make You a Believer," "I Want to Believe," "You Don't Have to Remind Me," and "Goin' Back Again." "Make You a Believer" and "I Want to Believe" were ranked on Billboard magazine's Mainstream Rock chart. Racine has sold 100,000 copies in Canada.

In 1992, Jordan recorded the duet "Trust in Me" with Joe Cocker for the motion picture The Bodyguard, after star Kevin Costner heard Jordan on his car radio. The soundtrack album for The Bodyguard sold more than 45 million copies worldwide.

In 1994, Sass Jordan released Rats which she cited as her favourite album. Rats yielded Jordan's first song on the Billboard Hot 100 with the single "Sun's Gonna Rise." However, Rats failed to build on the momentum of Racine, and Jordan subsequently was dropped from the MCA Records roster. Jordan then began recording for Aquarius Records, acquiescing to the label's request for a more mainstream sound for the albums Present (1997) and Hot Gossip (2000). "Those are probably my least favourite records," said Jordan. "I think there are some great songs, I just don't like the production at all."

=== Later career: 2006–2026 ===
Jordan's success as a judge on Canadian Idol encouraged her to return to recording in 2006. She recorded the Get What You Give album in Nashville, with Colin Linden as producer. Guest artists on the album included bassist Garry Tallent (of Bruce Springsteen's E Street Band), drummers Ken Coomer (Uncle Tupelo, Wilco) and Bryan Owings (Shelby Lynne), guitarist Audley Freed (The Black Crowes) and keyboardist Richard Bell (The Band, Janis Joplin). In 2009, she released the album From Dusk 'til Dawn.

During the early 2010s, Jordan formed the group S.U.N.(which stands for Something Unto Nothing) featuring Brian Tichy and Michael Devin of Whitesnake, and Tommy Stewart. S.U.N. began when Jordan reunited with Tichy at his Santa Clarita home studio to write songs. Something Unto Nothing marked the first collaboration between Jordan and Tichy since Rats. "Burned" was the first song that Jordan and Tichy wrote together for the project, which soon evolved into a full album S.U.N.: Something Unto Nothing. The self-titled debut album was released on 12 February 2013. It was remastered with bonus tracks in 2026.

Racine turned 25 in 2017, and Jordan released Racine Revisited featuring reimagined versions of the songs from the original 1992 album. In an interview with online magazine Riveting Riffs, Jordan stated she was not interested in making it sound like it was recorded in the contemporary style of 2017, but to reimagine it as if it were recorded in 1975.

On 13 March 2020, Jordan released Rebel Moon Blues, her first blues album. Released on the Stoney Plain Records label, the album features covers of blues classics, as well as the original "The Key." It debuted at number five on the Billboard Blues Album Chart on 28 March 2020. Rebel Moon Blues was critically acclaimed upon release, with American Blues Scene writing that her voice aged well , "Like fine wine, it's improved over the years."

Her second blues album called Bitches Blues, featuring the song "Still Alive and Well", was released on 3 June 2022.

In April 2023, Sass Jordan's live album, featuring Taylor Hawkins on drums in 1994, became available on streaming and vinyl pre-orders. The album was called Live in New York Ninety-Four.

== Other projects ==
Jordan enjoyed a successful acting career in theatre and television. Jordan played the lead role of Janis Joplin in the off-Broadway hit Love, Janis in 2001, and performed in the Toronto and Winnipeg productions of The Vagina Monologues. Jordan guest starred in the 1990s family-drama Sisters. She served as a judge on all six seasons of Canadian Idol, from 2003 to 2008. In 2019, Jordan joined A Bowie Celebration: The David Bowie Alumni Tour. Led by Mike Garson, Bowie's keyboard player for forty years, the one-of-a-kind roving tribute to David Bowie features Bowie's past bandmates.

She ventured into the world of alcohol and spirits in 2019 with Rebel Moon Whiskey. It is a blended Canadian whisky by Dixon Distilleries and Kick Ass Sass Wine (from Vineland Estates Winery, in the Niagara Region).

== Personal life ==
In the early 1990s, Sass Jordan toured with Taylor Hawkins, who later gained fame as the drummer for the Foo Fighters. Of Jordan, Hawkins said, "Sass taught me how to be in a rock and roll band and gave me my first rock and roll check." On 9 July 2015, Jordan was reunited with Hawkins when she joined Foo Fighters on stage in Toronto to cover "Stay with Me" by Faces. Before the performance, Dave Grohl said, "If it weren't for Sass Jordan, Taylor Hawkins wouldn't be in Foo Fighters." Jordan was married to musician Derek Sharp; they had one daughter.

=== Death ===
In September 2026, she cancelled her remaining tour dates and stepped away from professional commitments due to an undisclosed medical condition. Soon after, Jordan died on 2 October 2026, at the age of 65 and the cause of death was not given.

== Honours ==
Jordan was the recipient of the Juno Award for Most Promising Female Vocalist of the Year in 1989, and was nominated for Best Female Vocalist in 1990, 1993, and 1995. Billboard magazine listed Jordan as the Top Female Rock Artist of the Year in 1992. In 2012, Jordan was appointed honorary colonel of 417 Combat Support Squadron, an appointment she held until Glen Suitor's appointment in August 2016.

== Discography ==
=== Studio albums ===
Title	Details	Peak chart positions		
Title	Details	US	US Heat	Billboard Blues Albums
Tell Somebody	Release date: 1988; Label: Atlantic Records; Formats: CD	—	—	
Racine	Release date: 31 March 1992; Label: MCA Records; Formats: CD	174	2	
Rats	Release date: 1 March 1994; Label: Impact Records; Formats: CD	158	5	
Present	Release date: 1 November 1997; Label: Aquarius Records; Formats: CD	—	—	
Hot Gossip	Release date: 12 December 2000; Label: Aquarius Records; Formats: CD	—	—	
Get What You Give	Release date: 19 September 2006; Label: Universal Music Group; Formats: CD	—	—	
From Dusk 'Til Dawn	Release date: 15 September 2009; Label: Kindling Music; Formats: CD	—	—	
Racine Revisited	Release date: 15 September 2017; Label: Linus Entertainment; Formats: CD	—	—	
Rebel Moon Blues	Release date: 13 March 2020; Label: Stony Plain Records; Formats: CD	—	—	5
Bitches Blues	Release date: 3 June 2022; Label: Stony Plain Records; Formats: CD	—	—	15
Something Unto Nothing	Release date: 2 March 2026; Label: Crown X Recordings; Formats: CD	—	—	13
Details sourced from Sass Jordan's official website.
"—" denotes releases that did not chart

=== Singles ===
Year	Title	Chart Positions					Album
Year	Title	CAN	CAN AC	US	US AC	US Main	Album
1988	"Tell Somebody"	11	—	—	—	—	Tell Somebody
1989	"Double Trouble"	12	—	—	—	—	Tell Somebody
1989	"Stranger Than Paradise"	37	—	—	—	—	Tell Somebody
1989	"So Hard"	41	—	—	—	—	Tell Somebody
1989	"Rescue Me"	44	—	—	—	—	American Boyfriends (soundtrack)
1992	"Make You a Believer"	12	—	—	—	11	Racine
1992	"I Want to Believe"	16	20	—	—	—	Racine
1992	"You Don't Have to Remind Me"	15	—	—	—	12	Racine
1992	"Goin' Back Again"	14	—	—	—	—	Racine
1993	"Who Do You Think You Are"	37	—	—	—	—	Racine
1994	"High Road Easy"	9	—	—	—	6	Rats
1994	"Sun's Gonna Rise"	7	—	86	36	—	Rats
1994	"I'm Not"	47	—	—	—	—	Rats
1997	"Do What I Can"	20	6	—	—	—	Present
1998	"Desire"	12	—	—	—	—	Present
"—" denotes releases that did not chart or were not released in that country.
