= Michael Kaeshammer =

Canadian jazz and boogie-woogie pianist

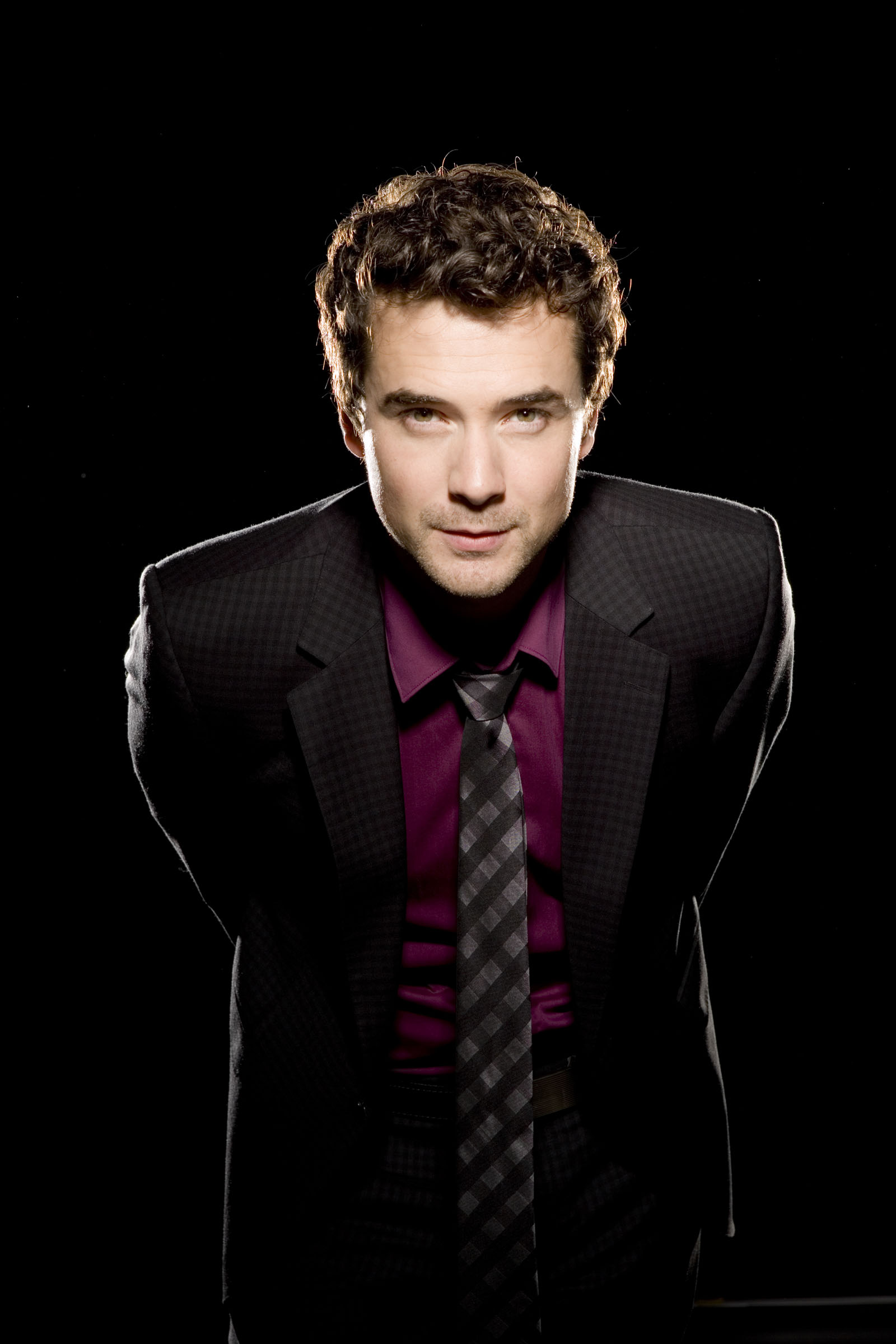

Background information
- Born: 7 January 1977 (age 49); Offenburg, West Germany
- Genres: Boogie woogie, blues, jazz stride
- Occupations: Musician, singer
- Instruments: Piano, vocals
- Labels: Alma, Alert, Linus
- Website: www.kaeshammer.com

Michael Kaeshammer (born 7 January 1977) is a Canadian jazz and boogie-woogie pianist.

== Early life and education ==
Kaeshammer grew up in Offenburg, Germany, where he studied classical piano for seven years. At age thirteen, he became interested in boogie-woogie and stride piano as played by Albert Ammons, Meade Lux Lewis, and Pete Johnson.

== Career ==
As a teenager, Kaeshammer played jazz and boogie-woogie in clubs, concerts and festivals around Germany and other surrounding parts of Europe. After he moved with his family to the west coast of Canada, Kaeshammer began performing at festivals across the country during the summer of 1996. That year his first album, Blue Key, was released. A second album, Tell You How I Feel came out in 1998, and No Strings Attached was released two-year later.

Kaeshammer has been the opening act for Anne Murray, Ray Charles, Allen Toussaint, Colin James, The Blind Boys of Alabama, and Holly Cole. He has conducted a number of multi-city tours through The People's Republic of China. He performed at Canada Day celebrations in Trafalgar Square, London, United Kingdom. In the US he has appeared multiple times as a featured performer on the Queen City Blues Fest's Arches Piano Stage in Cincinnati, OH.

In 2003, Kaeshammer released the album Strut; the next year he performed a solo on Jazz Sessions, which was broadcast on Bravo! Television. In 2005 he went on a concert tour throughout Canada.

Kaeshammer performed at the 2006 Winter Olympics in Torino, Italy, the 2008 Summer Olympics in Beijing, China, and at the opening ceremony of the 2010 Paralympics in Vancouver, British Columbia. Meanwhile, two more albums, Days Like These (2007), Lovelight (2009), were released.

Kaeshammer continued to record, releasing a self-titled album in 2011, KaeshammerLIVE! (2012), With You in Mind (2013), and an instrumental album, The Pianist in 2015.

Kaeshammer has been nominated for seven Juno Awards. He has also received the West Coast Music Award for Musician of the Year and Entertainer of the Year. His 2016 album No Filter is a mixture of jazz, blues and boogie-woogie. In 2016, he performed at the Maple Blues Awards in Toronto. He has also hosted the Canadian National Jazz Awards.

In fall 2023, he launched the television series Kaeshammer's Kitchen, which blended his musical career with his personal passion for cooking by featuring guest musicians with whom he cooks a meal before concluding each episode with a musical performance, on CHEK-DT and Yes TV.

== Discography ==
- No Strings Attached (Alma, 2001)
- Tell You How I Feel (Alma, 2001)
- Blue Keys (Festival, 2004)
- Strut (Alma, 2004)
- Days Like These (Alert, 2007)
- Lovelight (Alert, 2009)
- Kaeshammer (Alert, 2011)
- Kaeshammer Live! (Alert, 2012)
- With You in Mind (Idla, 2013)
- No Filter (Idla, 2017)
- Pianist (Idla, 2017)
- Something New (Linus, 2018)
- Turn It Up (Seven.One Starwatch, Sony Music, 2024)

== Awards and recognition ==
2001 JUNO Award (Nominated) - Best Contemporary Jazz Album - Instrumental, for No Strings Attached

2004 JUNO Award (Nominated) - Best Contemporary Jazz Album - Instrumental, for Strut

2008 JUNO Award (Winner) - Vocal Jazz Album of the Year, for Days Like These

2010 JUNO Award (Nominated) - Vocal Jazz Album of the Year, for Lovelight

2013 JUNO Award (Nominated) - Music DVD of the Year, for Kaeshammerlive!

2018 JUNO Award (Nominated) - Vocal Jazz Album of the Year, for No Filter
