= Derek Sharp =

Canadian multi-instrumentalist, songwriter and vocalist

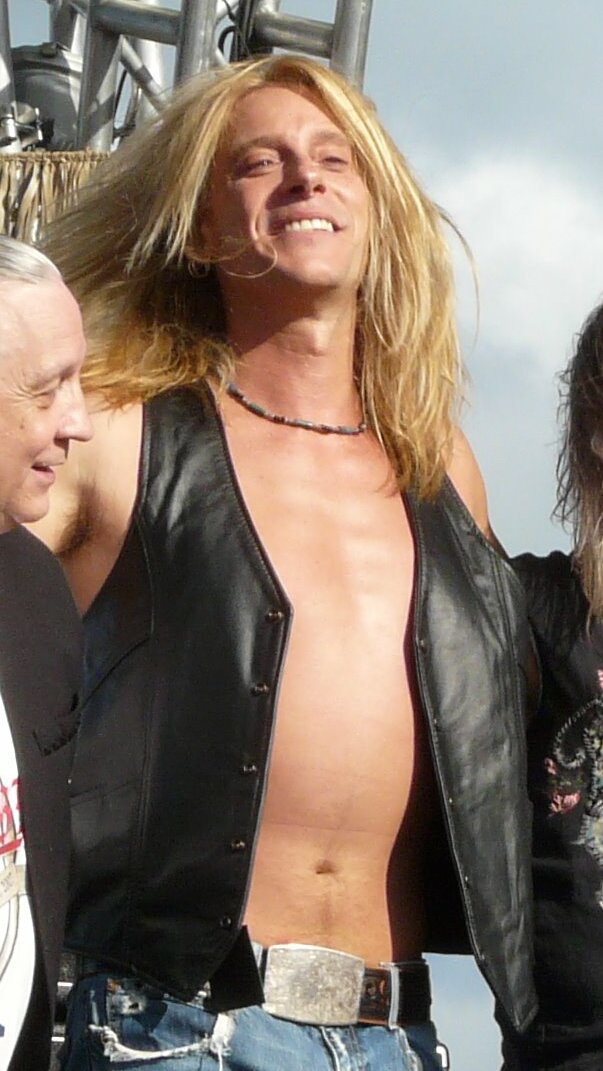
- Derek Sharp performing live

Background information
- Born: Derek Sharp; Thunder Bay, Ontario, Canada
- Occupations: Musician; songwriter; record producer; engineer; vocalist
- Instruments: Vocals; guitar; bass guitar; keyboards; drums
- Years active: 1980s–present
- Spouse: Sass Jordan (died 2026)

Derek "D#" Sharp is a Canadian multi-instrumentalist, songwriter, producer, engineer, and vocalist. He is best known as the lead singer and frontman of the Jim Kale-managed incarnation of The Guess Who from 2008 to 2024.

== Career ==
=== Early career and collaborations ===
Born in Thunder Bay, Ontario, Canada, Sharp has worked with a wide range of musicians, including Jeff Healey, Alannah Myles, Red Rider, Styx, Glenn Hughes (Deep Purple), Joe Lynn Turner (Rainbow), Alex Ligertwood (Santana), Ellis Hall, and Lawrence Gowan.

He served as the musical director and producer for the Canadian Idol winner tours, featuring artists such as Kalan Porter, Carly Rae Jepsen, and Melissa O'Neil. Sharp has also performed and recorded with Canadian Music Hall of Fame legends Andy Kim and Bobby Curtola.

=== Collaborations with Sass Jordan ===
Sharp had a longstanding musical partnership with his wife, Canadian rock vocalist Sass Jordan, whom he first met in 1995. He appears on Jordan's albums Get What You Give, From Dusk 'Til Dawn, Racine Revisited and Rebel Moon Blues.

=== The Guess Who (2008–2024) ===
Sharp acted as frontman for The Guess Who beginning in 2008. Though it was billed as a continuation of the iconic Canadian rock group that originally disbanded in 1975, the version fronted by Sharp was founded and led by former bassist Jim Kale, who had registered The Guess Who band name as a trademark in the United States in 1987 and brought on former drummer Garry Peterson as a co-owner in 2006. Sharp appears on two albums released under the Guess Who name, 2018's The Future Is What It Used To Be and 2023's Plein D'Amour.

In September 2024, it was reported that former Guess Who members Burton Cummings and Randy Bachman had regained the rights to the Guess Who name from Kale and Peterson in an out-of-court settlement after over a year of legal action, effectively ending this incarnation of the band. While The Future Is What It Used To Be remains available through Cleopatra Records, Plein D'Amour has been re-released by Sharp under the band name Derek Sharp and the Champagne Jam.
