= Bündock =

Canadian band

- Origin: Grand-Mère, Quebec, Canada
- Genres: Rock; Folk Rock; Pop
- Years active: 1979–1989, 2009
- Past members: Pierre Bundock; Dominique Lanoie; Marc Gendron; Alain Roussel; Antoine Mainguy; Martin Plante; Guy Pelletier

Bündock is a Canadian band from Montreal, Quebec. Active during the 1980s, they created songs in both English and French.

== History ==
Bündock was formed in 1979 in Grand-Mère, Quebec (later in Shawinigan). The band moved to Montreal in 1983 and soon began writing songs in English. The band released an EP, Mauve, in 1986. It scored a minor hit in Canada in 1987 with "American Singer," a tribute to Jim Morrison, which peaked at #72 in the RPM100. The EP also featured the song "Come On (Baby Tonight)," a duet with Sass Jordan.

In 1988, the single "Season for Love" appeared on the RPM CanCon charts. That year, it also released the album Société Anonyme, and toured to support the album as an opening act for The Box. The album was a Prix Félix finalist for English Album of the Year in 1988.

It followed up with the French-language album Cinéma in 1989.

Bündock disbanded in 1989. Marc Gendron became a record producer, musical director and bass player for many artists including French Star Natasha St-Pier, Cindy Bédard and Orloge Simard. Roussel went on to teach high school French at École secondaire Monseigneur-Richard, in Verdun, Montreal. Pierre Bundock became a multimedia instructor in the Collège Édouard-Montpetit, in Longueuil.

On November 11, 2009, the band reunited for a new Christmas album called Joyeux Noël. The album featured original band members and also the violinist Mara Tremblay, Marie Bernard, and Elle.

== Members ==
- Pierre Bundock - vocals
- Dominique Lanoie - guitar
- Marc Gendron - bass (1979-2009)
- Alain Roussel - drums (1979-1994)
- Antoine Mainguy - drums (2009)

== Discography ==
=== Albums ===
- Mauve (Alert) – 1986
- Société Anonyme (Alert) – 1988

1. "Silhouette"
2. "Stand Still"
3. "Season for Love"
4. "Cowboy"
5. "Forbidden Zone"
6. "Tied for Time"
7. "Lover for Hire"
8. "Never Trust"
9. "Pris par le temps"
10. "El Salvador (The Beat Of)
11. "American Singer"
12. "Le Corbeau"
13. "Be for Tomorrow"
14. "Come On (Baby Tonight)"
15. "Now Now"

- Cinéma (Alert) 1989

1. "Radio"
2. "L'Automne"
3. "Cadillac"
4. "Elle"
5. "Cinéma"
6. "La Danse"
7. "Le Mirador"
8. "Guillotine"
9. "Naiveté"
10. "Le Pays d'ivoire"
11. "Laisse le vent"

- Joyeux Noël - 2009

1. "Les douze jours de Noël"
2. "Gloria"
3. "L'enfant au tambour"
4. "Fa La La"
5. "Le brasier d'amour"
6. "Joyeux Noël"
7. "La belle Carole"
8. "L'étang"
9. "La table est mise"
10. "Le cadeau"
11. "Les fiançailles"

=== Singles ===
- "American Singer" [purple vinyl 7"] (Alert) – 1987
- "Le Corbeau"/"Come On Baby Tonight" [12"] (Alert) – 1987
- "Tied For Time" (Alert) – 1988
- "Never Trust" (Alert) – 1988

=== Videos ===
- American Singer – 1987
- Le Corbeau – 1987
- Tied For Time – 1988
