= Racine (album) =

Studio album by Sass Jordan
- Released: 18 February 1992
- Studio: Cherokee Studios and NRG Recording Studios (Hollywood, California)
- Genre: Rock, hard rock
- Length: 47:07
- Label: Aquarius (Canada); MCA (USA)
- Producer: Rick Neigher

Sass Jordan chronology
Tell Somebody (1988)	Racine (1992)	Rats (1994)

Racine is the second studio album by Canadian rock singer/songwriter Sass Jordan, released on MCA Records 31 March 1992. Jordan's "barroom hard rock" style on this album has been compared to that of the Black Crowes.

Professional ratings
Review scores
Source	Rating
AllMusic	4/5 stars

== Track listing ==
No.	Title	Writer(s)	Length
1.	"Make You a Believer"	Sass Jordan, Rick Neigher	4:45
2.	"If You're Gonna Love Me"	Jordan, Neigher	3:45
3.	"You Don't Have to Remind Me"	Jordan, Stevie Salas, Parthenon Huxley	4:07
4.	"Who Do You Think You Are"	Jordan, Neigher	3:59
5.	"Windin' Me Up"	Jordan, Neigher	3:56
6.	"I Want to Believe"	Jordan, Salas	4:30
7.	"Goin' Back Again"	Jordan, Kevin Savigar, Robin LeMesurier	4:28
8.	"Do What Ya Want"	Jordan, Neigher	4:21
9.	"Cry Baby"	Jordan, Salas	4:46
10.	"Where There's a Will"	Jordan, Neigher	3:42
11.	"Time Flies"	Jordan, Salas, Randy Cantor	4:43

== Personnel ==
- Sass Jordan – lead and backing vocals
- Kevin Savigar – keyboards
- Rick Neigher – lead guitar, rhythm guitar, backing vocals
- Stevie Salas – lead guitar, rhythm guitar
- Johnny Lee Schell – lead guitar, rhythm guitar, backing vocals
- Eric Bazilian – mandolin
- Gregg Sutton – bass, backing vocals
- David Raven – drums
- Erik Gloege – percussion, backing vocals
- Jerry Goodman – violin
- C.J. Vanston – string arrangements
- The Martin Brothers – horns and horn arrangements:
  - Andy Martin – trombone
  - Scott Martin – saxophones
  - Stan Martin – trumpets

=== Production ===
- Producer – Rick Neigher
- A&R – Randy Nicklaus
- Engineers – Dennis Mackay and Ed Thacker
- Mixed by Ed Thacker
- Mastered by Greg Calbi at Sterling Sound (New York City, New York).
- Production Coordination – Paul Leighton and Mark Sullivan
- Art Direction and Design – Jim Pezzullo at Studio Seereeni.
- Photography – Moshe Brakha
- Wardrobe Design – Karen Dusenberry
- Hair – Susan Mancini
- Makeup – Terri Apansewicz
- Management – Bruce Bird and Lisa Janzen at Camel-Z.
