= The Box (band) =

Canadian new wave group

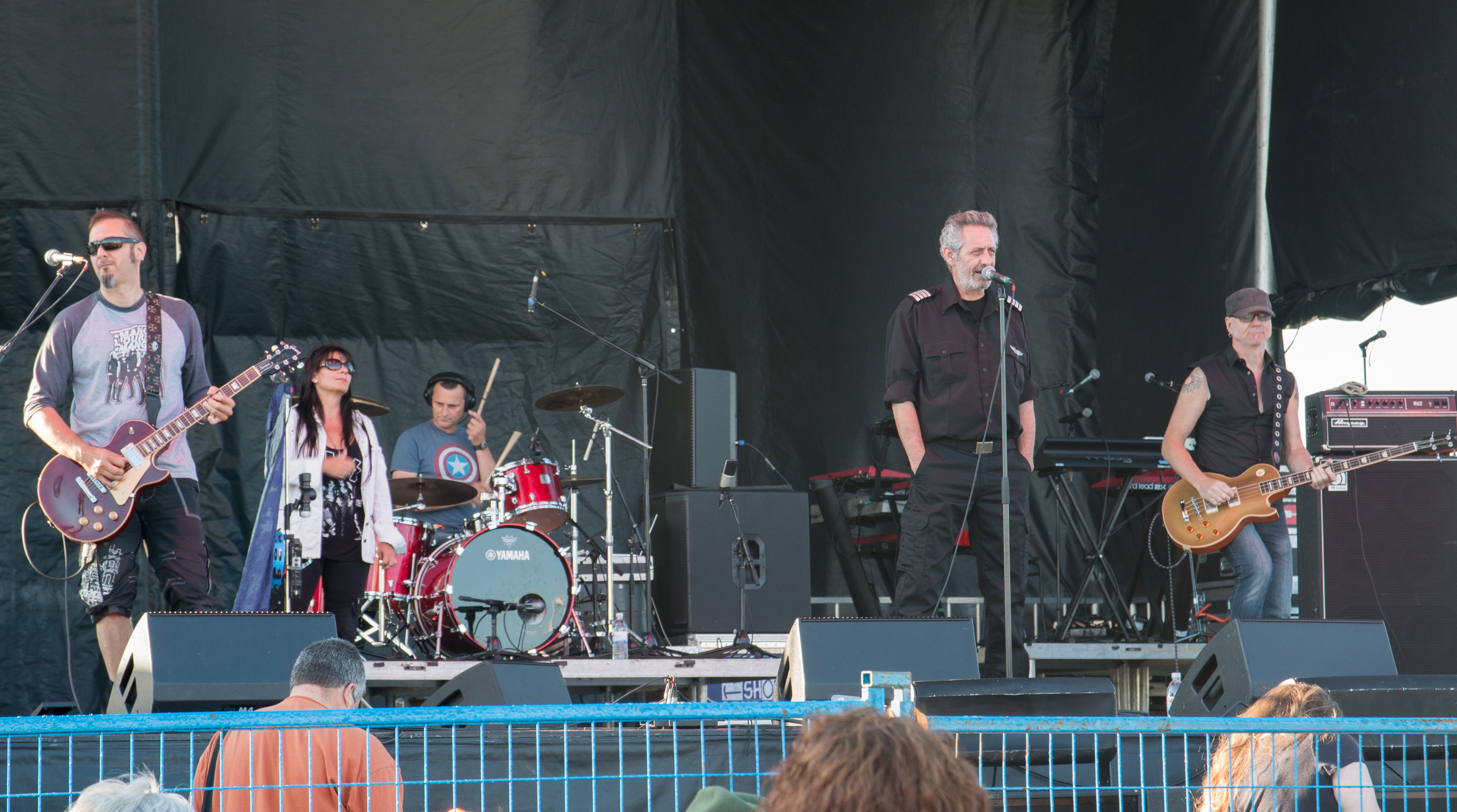
- The Box performing at the 2015 Festival of Friends

Background information
- Also known as: Box
- Origin: Montreal, Quebec, Canada
- Genres: New wave, rock, progressive rock
- Years active: 1981–1992, 2002–present
- Labels: Alert, Universal, Capitol
- Members: Jean-Marc Pisapia; Dan Volj; Guillaume Jodoin; Francois Bruneau; Martin Lapierre; Isabelle Lemay
- Past members: Guy Florent; Jean-Pierre Brie; Guy Pisapia; Sylvain Coutu; Philippe Bernard; Claude Thibault; Luc Papineau; Denis Faucher; Eric Theocharides; Marie Carmen; Sass Jordan
- Website: theboxband.com

The Box is a Canadian pop rock band from Montreal, Quebec, whose style evolved from synth-based new wave pop on their early albums toward prog-influenced guitar rock later in their careers. Founded in 1981, they achieved commercial success in Canada, recording four charting albums and 10 charting singles between 1984 and 1990.

The group broke up in 1992, but a new line-up was founded in 2004. This iteration of the group has released two further albums.

== Biography ==
The band was formed in 1981 by Jean-Marc Pisapia, an early member of Men Without Hats. He recruited guitarist Guy Florent and bassist Jean-Pierre Brie and, before they settled on calling themselves The Box, the group was known as Checkpoint Charlie.

The band's first single attracted the attention of Montreal radio station CKOI-FM, leading to a deal with Alert Records. Also that year, Jean-Marc's brother Guy Pisapia joined on keyboards.

Their debut album The Box was released in 1984, and produced the singles "Must I Always Remember" and "Walk Away". Drummer Sylvain Coutu joined the band for its supporting tour, but was replaced by Pierre Taillefer before the next album. Florent also left and was replaced by Claude Thibeault. Their shows to promote the album included some dates opening for British prog rock band Marillion on their Canadian tour.

In 1985, The Box released All the Time, All the Time, All the Time. That album, which included backing vocals by Sass Jordan and Marie Carmen, produced the singles "My Dreams of You" and "L'Affaire Dumoutier (Say To Me...)". The latter song, in which Pisapia narrates, rather than singing, a tale of a murder committed by a man with multiple personality disorder, was opposed as a single by the record label due to its unconventional sound, strange subject matter, and bilingual lyric (which required English listeners to understand French if they wanted to understand the full story, including the climactic punchline) but the label relented due to the strength of its cinematic music video, which was constructed as a mid-century European crime thriller film with Pisapia playing the police detective. Pisapia, who to this day considers it the best song he ever wrote, was vindicated when the song became the band's first Top 40 hit.

"L'Affaire Dumoutier", further, was one part of a trilogy of songs, with the album track "Evil in Me" and the non-album "For the First and Very Last" delving further into the murderer's story, although they were released as B-sides to "L'Affaire Dumoutier" rather than separate singles.

They won the 1985 Félix Award for group of the year, and were nominated for the Juno Award for Most Promising Group of the Year at the Juno Awards of 1985.

1987's Closer Together was the band's most commercially and critically successful album. Featuring the hit singles "Ordinary People", the title track, and "Crying Out Loud for Love", the album was certified platinum. Backing vocals on the album were provided by Jordan and Martine St. Clair. The band's biggest hit, "Closer Together", was originally commissioned for a fundraiser for an anti-leukemia foundation.

The band received a Juno nomination for Group of the Year at the Juno Awards of 1987, and won the Félix Awards for Anglophone Group of the Year, Anglophone Single of the Year and Video of the Year. In 1988, they won the Rock Express reader poll for Best Canadian Group and Best Canadian Album.

After touring for more than eighteen months, the band took six months off to recover before returning with 1990's The Pleasure and the Pain, produced by Martin Rushent. That album was a commercial disappointment; Pisapia attributed this in part to the band's position as francophones who were performing in English instead of French, causing their fans in Quebec to turn against them in the increasingly polarized climate of the Meech Lake era, and to the album having represented a compromise between his musical vision and label pressures to make a mainstream rock album that could break them into the United States.

Pisapia also later asserted that the nearly two years of constant touring between Closer Together and The Pleasure and the Pain left the band burnt out and exhausted, and he was further annoyed when the label forced the band to appear as an opening act for Sinéad O'Connor's Canadian concert dates to promote I Do Not Want What I Haven't Got in 1990, even though they were already a headlining act in their own right.

The Box disbanded in 1992 after releasing the greatest hits compilation A Decade of Box Music.

== Hiatus and revival ==
Pisapia released a solo album, John of Mark, in 1995, which was later reissued as a Box album in 2015. He subsequently supported himself principally as a writer of television advertising jingles.

Pisapia revived The Box with a new lineup in 2002, issuing two new Box tracks (recorded in 1996 and 2002) on a new hits compilation, Always in Touch With You. This version of The Box was essentially Pisapia backed by session musicians, but the line-up soon coalesced into steady group that had a decidedly more prog-rock orientation than the original incarnation of the band.

In 2005, the band released Black Dog There, its first new album in 15 years. The album, a concept album about a young man from the Canadian Prairies who becomes an astronaut but gets caught between parallel universes when his spaceship explodes, was inspired by Pisapia's love of progressive rock bands such as Genesis, Pink Floyd and Gentle Giant.

This was followed up by the 2009 album D'Après le horla de Maupassant (or simply Le Horla for short), the first Box album sung entirely in French.

By the 2010s, the music industry had changed so much that Pisapia felt no need to create entire albums. "Back in the 80s, it was very simple... Today, even the most experienced executive in a record company doesn’t know where to start." Pisapia had begun painting, but still had his own recording studio for when he got "the urge" to make music. The Box released several singles (in both English and French) and a four song EP, Take Me Home during this decade.

In 2024, the band performed at Quebec City's Festival d'été de Québec.

== Discography ==
=== Singles ===
Year	Single	Peak positions		Album
Year	Single	CAN	QC	Album
1984	"Walk Away"	48	46	The Box
1984	"Must I Always Remember"	82	—	The Box
1984	"Dancing on the Grave"	—	—	The Box
1985	"With All This Cash"	—	—	All the Time, All the Time, All the Time
1985	"L'Affaire Dumoutier (Say To Me...)"	21	18	All the Time, All the Time, All the Time
1986	"My Dreams of You"	51	30	All the Time, All the Time, All the Time
1987	"Closer Together"	13	2	Closer Together
1987	"Ordinary People"	16	10	Closer Together
1987	"Crying Out Loud for Love"	40	8	Closer Together
1988	"I'm Back"	—	—	Closer Together
1990	"Carry On"	12	3	The Pleasure and the Pain
1990	"Temptation"	39	4	The Pleasure and the Pain
1990	"Inside My Heart"	20	7	The Pleasure and the Pain
2014	"Les plus belles années de ta vie"	—	—	(Single only)
2015	"Life is a Party"	—	—	(Single only)
2015	"Trop Loin"	—	—	(Single only)
2016	"Incredible Human Being"	—	—	(Single only)
"—" denotes releases that did not chart

=== Albums ===
==== Original studio albums ====
Release date	Title	Chart positions
Release date	Title	Canada RPM Album charts
May 1984	The Box	95
January 1986	All the Time, All the Time, All the Time	73
March 1987	Closer Together	25
March 1990	The Pleasure and the Pain	31
June 1995	John of Mark	-
March 2005	Black Dog There	-
November 2009	D'Après le horla de Maupassant	-
March 2018	Take Me Home (EP)	-

==== Compilation albums ====
- A Decade of Box Music (1992)
- Always in Touch with You: The Best of the Box (2002)
- The Best of the Box (2007) CD + DVD
