= Holly Cole =

Canadian jazz singer (born 1963)

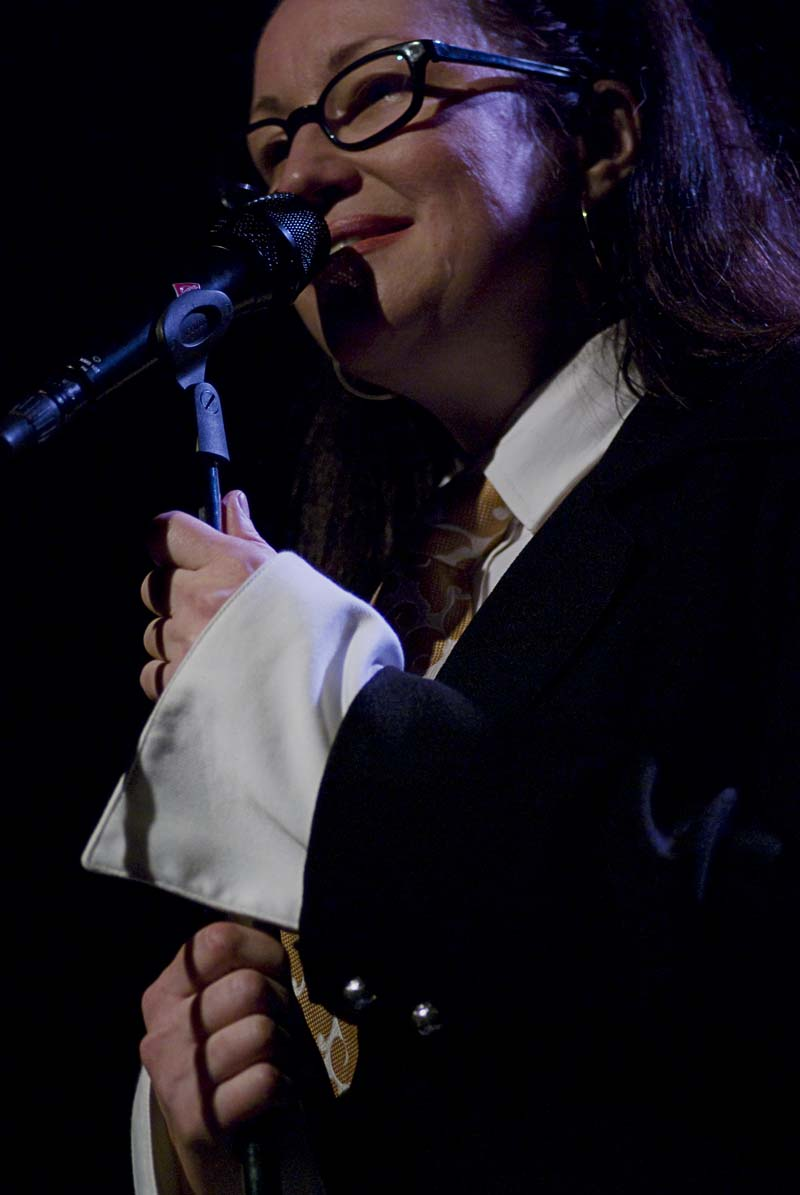
- Cole in 2008

Background information
- Born: November 25, 1963 (age 62); Halifax, Nova Scotia, Canada
- Genre: Jazz
- Occupation: Singer
- Years active: 1983–present
- Labels: Alert Music; Tradition & Moderne
- Website: hollycole.com

Holly Cole (born November 25, 1963) is a Canadian jazz singer and actress. For many years she performed with her group The Holly Cole Trio.

== Background ==
Cole was born in Halifax, Nova Scotia. Her father, Leon Cole, was a noted radio broadcaster for the CBC Stereo network.

== Holly Cole Trio ==
In 1983, Cole travelled to Toronto to seek a musical career. In 1986, she founded a trio with bassist David Piltch and pianist Aaron Davis. Offered a record deal in 1989, the Holly Cole Trio released an EP, Christmas Blues, that year, which featured a version of The Pretenders' "2,000 Miles," which has proven to be popular. This was followed by their first album, Girl Talk, in 1990.

A succession of releases followed through the early 1990s. For example, 1991's Blame It On My Youth, covered songs by Tom Waits ("Purple Avenue," aka "Empty Pockets") and Lyle Lovett ("God Will"), includes show tunes such as "If I Were a Bell" (from Guys and Dolls) and "On the Street Where You Live" (from My Fair Lady), and "Trust In Me," from Disney's The Jungle Book. Also recorded in this period was a reinterpretation of Elvis Costello's "Alison."

In 1993, the trio released Don't Smoke in Bed, an album produced by David Was, which included a hit single cover version of "I Can See Clearly Now". According to Jeff Bateman and James Hale, "The video for the song was put into heavy rotation on MuchMusic and earned a Juno Award nomination for Best Video. The album went platinum in Canada, reached No. 7 on the Billboard Contemporary Jazz chart, and won a Juno Award for Best Contemporary Jazz Album, in 1994."

During this time she also had an acting role in Laurie Lynd's Genie Award-winning short film The Fairy Who Didn't Want to Be a Fairy Anymore.

On November 10, 1994, the Holly Cole Trio performed in a first-season episode of Due South ("Chicago Holiday, Part 1") with Cole singing the Aaron Davis composition "Neon Blue" in a dinner club for several minutes during the opening credits. The song was later released on the Due South: The Original Television Soundtrack (1996) CD, and later by Holly Cole only on the Japanese compilation album Yesterday & Today (1994). The Holly Cole Trio followed this appearance with another in the following Due South episode (of November 17) where she sings "Smile" from Blame It On My Youth during the ball scene at the end of the episode.

== Solo career ==
Following Don't Smoke In Bed, the trio released a CD entirely of songs by Tom Waits, called Temptation. This 1995 release also dropped the "Trio" from the label.

Cole followed with two albums, Dark Dear Heart (1997) and Romantically Helpless (2000), which veered further from jazz by introducing pop elements to Cole's sound.

In 2001, she returned to the Christmas jazz roots of her first CD with Baby It's Cold Outside, which included "Christmas Time is Here" (from A Charlie Brown Christmas), "Santa Baby", and the title track. Swapping cold for hot, she moved to a summer theme in 2003's Shade, this time reinterpreting Cole Porter ("Too Darn Hot"), Irving Berlin ("Heatwave"), and The Beach Boys' Brian Wilson ("God Only Knows"). The album was named Jazz Recording of the Year at the 2004 Juno Awards.

In 2002, Cole was the featured vocalist on an album of compositions by the English Composer Gavin Bryars, titled I Have Heard It Said That a Spirit Enters, singing on the title piece, as well as on "Planet Earth" and "The Apple".

Cole's album Holly Cole (originally entitled This House Is Haunted) was released in Canada in March 2007. It was released in the US in January 2008 and was followed by a US tour.

Cole tours frequently, particularly around the holiday season, in Canada. She was also a part of the 1998 Lilith Fair tour, and her song "Onion Girl" was included on that year's live compilation album.

In 2010, Cole contributed a track for the World Jazz For Haiti charity album, recorded at Number 9 Audio Group in support of the Red Cross disaster relief fund. The album featured Canadian artists such as John McDermott, David Clayton-Thomas and George Koller.

Cole's first live DVD + CD titled Steal The Night: Live at the Glenn Gould Studio was released in Canada in February 2012. It was recorded live at Glenn Gould Studio in Toronto on August 11, 2011. The performance marks the reformation of the original Holly Cole Trio lineup with Aaron Davis on piano and bassist David Piltch, in addition to John Johnson (horns), Rob Piltch (guitars) and Davide DiRenzo (drums).

Cole's first studio album in five years, Night was released in late 2012 on Universal Music Canada. The album, produced by Cole and Greg Cohen, covers songs from Tom Waits ("Walk Away"), Gordon Lightfoot ("If You Could Read My Mind"), Mort Shuman ("Viva Las Vegas"), Captain Beefheart ("Love Lies"), a James Bond Theme by John Barry ("You Only Live Twice"), and a Cole original ("You've Got a Secret"). Cole toured in support of Night in 2012–13 to Canada, America, Germany and Japan.

In 2014, Cole received an honorary degree from Queen's University in Kingston, Ontario in June 2014.

In February 2018, she released a new studio album titled Holly. In 2019, Holly Cole reunited the original Holly Cole Trio, with David Piltch on bass and Aaron Davis on piano, to celebrate the 40th anniversary of the Festival International de Jazz de Montreal. They performed at the cabaret Lion d'Or in Montreal, and these special shows were recorded and became the 2021 album Montreal. For Christmas 2022, Cole released a remastered compilation combining her holiday releases from 1989 and 2001, titled anew Baby It's Cold Outside and I Have the Christmas Blues.

For her 13th studio album Dark Moon, released on January 24, 2025, when asked about the recording process Cole said "I really wanted this album to embrace the spirit of spontaneity. And at the same time a quintessential part of the sound of my music is in the arrangements. So, we did very little rehearsal in advance, and the songs were incredibly fresh for us while we were in the studio. The musicians that I play with contribute greatly to the arranging of the songs, and I wanted to hear the sound of when the light goes on for each one of us and many of the arrangements fell together as we played them. What we end up hearing on this record is the moment when we discover what we love about the song, and what its essence is for me."

"I have always been a lover of the night going way back to when I was a young child growing up in Halifax. One of my very earliest memories is of waking up in the middle of the night with croup. I was feverish, with a sore throat and a bad cough. My mother crushed a grown-up aspirin into canned peaches that I ate, and then my father bundled me up and put me on his shoulders and we walked around the neighbourhood in the middle of the night. What I was about to behold I would never forget. My neighbourhood had been transformed into a captivating, mystical, deserted land that was lit only by the beguiling moon. The same moon which was completely invisible during the day. This was a mystery. All I could hear were my father's footsteps because there were no other people around at all. And I could feel the cool, moist Nova Scotia sea air soothe my sore throat and rid me of my cough while I gazed from my father's shoulders at what was my neighbourhood, but at night in the moonlight it looked like magic to me. And when we got home I felt that I had the most incredible secret. Ever since the moon has compelled me and affects my creative process.

The song 'Dark Moon' appealed to me for a variety of reasons. I was struck by the charm of the lyrics which lend themselves to a minimal approach and a slower tempo so that there is time to let the meaning resonate. It is also interesting to me how the role of the moon is reversed. Typically, in songs the moon is influencing the lovers. In this case, the lovers are influencing the mood of the moon - or at least they suspect that they are. The simple structure of the song left it wide open to arranging ideas like extending the form and adding a variety of harmonies. Of course, The Good Lovelies were a natural fit".

Holly on the title track of this album Dark Moon.

== Television music specials ==
Cole was a featured artist in the one-hour special Standards produced by Jeremy Podeswa and Ingrid Veninger and directed by Podeswa. It premiered on Sunday Arts Entertainment on CBC Television in 1992. The special, which was inspired by David Ramsden's Quiet Please! There's a Lady on Stage also featured Jane Siberry, Cherie Camp, Laura Hubert, Molly Johnson, Sarah McLachlan, Maggie Moore, and David Ramsden. Cole sang George and Ira Gershwin's "The Man I Love" with altered lyrics.

Poster for the TV Special Holly Cole Trio – My Foolish Heart (1993)

Cole, Aaron Davis and David Piltch were featured in a one-hour music special entitled Holly Cole Trio – My Foolish Heart. It was directed by Michael McNamara and produced by Bruce Glawson and Arnie Zipursky of Cambium Productions. The special premiered on Global Television Network on January 5, 1993, and featured a concert taped at Brampton’s Heritage Theatre. The special won the Silver Hugo award at the Chicago International Film Festival, and the Gold Special Jury Award in TV and Cable Production in Performance Arts at the Worldfest-Houston International Film & Festival in 1993. The following year, it won two Gemini awards – Best Music Program or Series and Cole was honoured for Best Performance in a Music or Performing Arts Program.

On August 31, 1993, Cole was featured in Intimate and Interactive With Holly Cole on MuchMusic. The Holly Cole Trio won Best Performance in a Performing Arts Program/Series at the 9th Annual Gemini Industry Awards in March 1995.

Cole, along with Mary Margaret O'Hara, Ed Robertson, Serena Ryder, and Hawksley Workman performed in Christmas at the Concert Hall, a special hosted by Erica Ehm. It was telecast on Bravo (Canada) on December 9, 2008.

== Discography ==
- Christmas Blues (Alert, 1989)
- Girl Talk (Alert, 1990)
- Blame It on My Youth (Alert, 1991)
- Don't Smoke in Bed (Alert, 1993)
- Yesterday & Today (Capitol, 1994)
- Temptation (Alert, 1995)
- It Happened One Night (Alert, 1996)
- Dark Dear Heart (Metro Blue, 1997)
- Treasure (Alert, 1998)
- Romantically Helpless (Alert, 2000)
- Baby, It's Cold Outside (Alert, 2001)
- Shade (Alert, 2003)
- Holly Cole (Alert, 2007)
- Night (Tradition & Moderne, 2012)
- Steal the Night: Live at the Glenn Gould Studio (Tradition & Moderne, 2012)
- Holly (Shanachie, 2019)
- Montreal (Rumpus Room, 2020)
- Dark Moon (Universal, Rumpus Room, 2025)

== Associated projects ==
- Count Your Blessings (an Alert Records Christmas compilation CD, 1994)
- Feast (instrumental CD by trio members Aaron Davis and David Piltch, 1996)
