= Alert Records =

Canadian record label

Alert Music
- Founded: 1984
- Founder: W. Tom Berry
- Genre: Indie
- Country of origin: Canada
- Location: Toronto, Ontario
- Official website: www.alertmusic.com

Alert Music was a recording, publishing, producing, and artist management company founded in 1984 by W. Tom Berry and Marc Durand, based in Toronto, Ontario, Canada. It was home to Alert Records, an independent record label. The company has no current roster and has been dormant since 2014.

== Past recording artists ==
- Michael Kaeshammer
- The Box
- Roxanne Potvin
- Gino Vannelli
- Andy Curran
- Johnny Favourite
- Universal Honey
- Eric Andersen
- Michael Breen
- Bündock
- Crystal Pistol
- Holly Cole
- Kim Mitchell
- Blue Oil

== See also ==
- List of record labels
