= Allen Toussaint discography =

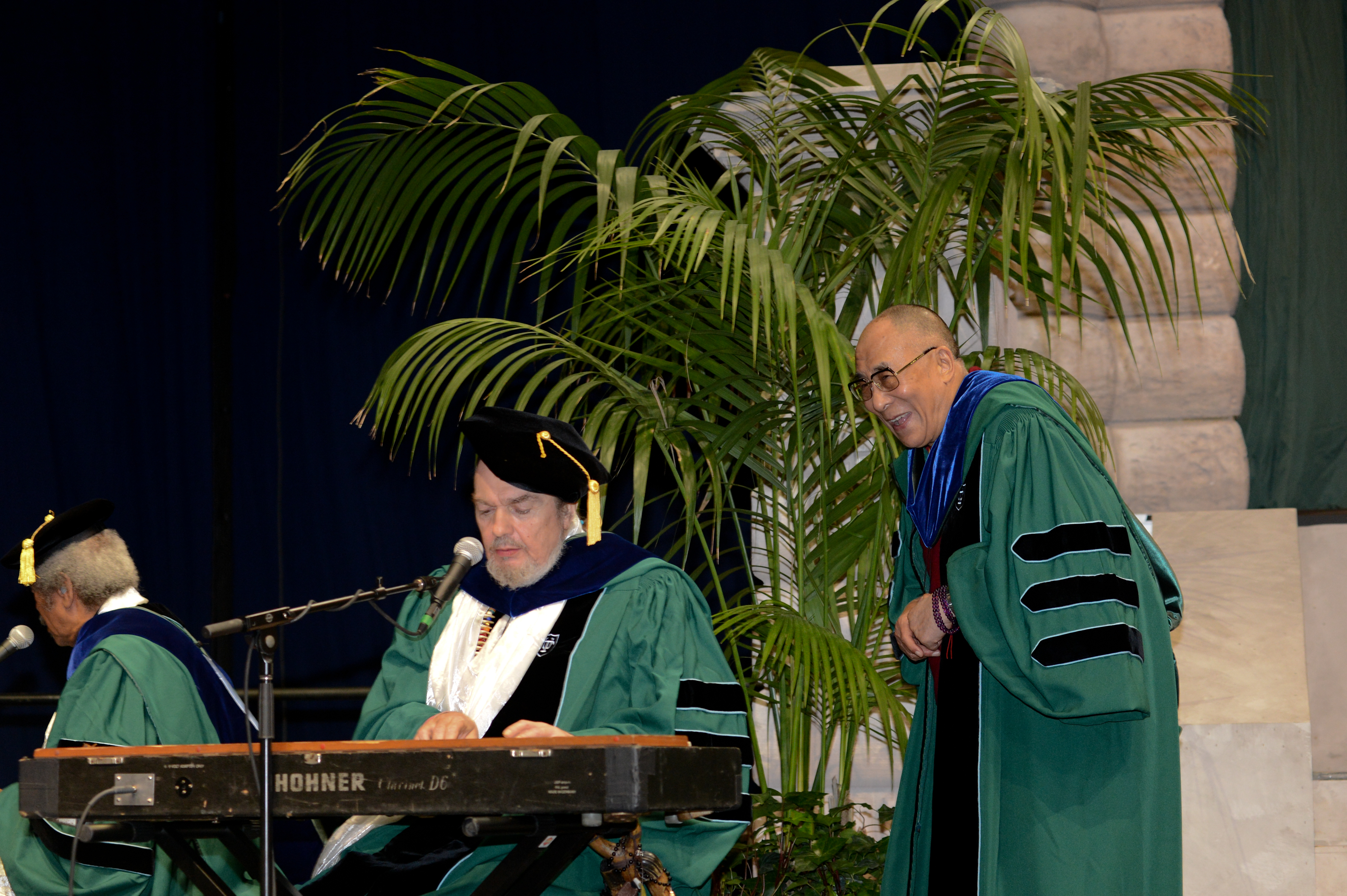
Tulane University Commencement, New Orleans. Allen Toussaint and Dr. John perform a duet. The 14th Dalai Lama got out of his seat and came over to watch and listen closely in obvious delight.

This is the discography for American R&B-jazz musician Allen Toussaint.

== Albums ==
=== Studio albums ===
- The Wild Sound of New Orleans (1958)
- Toussaint [AKA From A Whisper To A Scream] (1970)
- Life, Love and Faith (1972)
- Southern Nights (1975)
- Motion (1978)
- Mr. Mardi Gras: I Love A Carnival Ball (Starring Allen Toussaint) (1987)
- Connected (1996)
- A New Orleans Christmas (1997)
- Allen Toussaint's Jazzity Project: Going Places (2004)
- The Bright Mississippi (2009)
- American Tunes (2016)

=== Live album ===
- Songbook (2013)
- Numerous concert recordings from the annual New Orleans Jazz & Heritage Festival

=== Compilations ===
- The Allen Toussaint Collection (1991)
- Finger Poppin' and Stompin' Feet (20 Classic Allen Toussaint Productions For Minit Records 1960-1962 (2002)
- The Complete Warner Recordings (2003)
- What Is Success (The Scepter and Bell Recordings) (2007)

=== Collaborations ===
- Cahoots (Capitol, 1971), The Band (Brass arrangements by Toussaint on "Life is a Carnival")
- Rock of Ages (Capitol, 1972), The Band
- In the Right Place (Atco, 1973), with Dr. John and The Meters
- Desitively Bonnaroo (Atco, 1974), with Dr. John and The Meters
- King Biscuit Boy [AKA The Brown Derby Album] (Epic, 1974), with King Biscuit Boy and The Meters
- Venus and Mars (Capitol, 1975), with Wings
- Notice to Appear (ABC, 1976), with John Mayall; 7 of the 10 songs by Toussaint, who also plays piano, clavinet, Fender Rhodes piano, and RMI percussion
- New Orleans Heat (Tomato, 1978), with Albert King
- Luxury You Can Afford (Elektra, 1978), with Joe Cocker
- Changes (MCA, 1980), with Etta James
- Released (Epic, 1980), with Patti LaBelle
- The Definition of Soul (Point Blank/Virgin/EMI, 1997), with Solomon Burke
- A Taste of New Orleans (NYNO, 1998), with various artists/credited to 'Allen Toussaint & Friends'
- I Believe To My Soul (Rhino/Hear Music, 2005), with Ann Peebles, Billy Preston, Mavis Staples, and Irma Thomas
- The River in Reverse, with Elvis Costello (Verve Forecast, 2006)
- Goin' Home: A Tribute to Fats Domino (Vanguard, 2007), with various artists/duet with Paul McCartney on "I Want to Walk You Home"
- I Know I've Been Changed (EMI Gospel, 2010), with Aaron Neville
- Clapton (Duck/Reprise, 2010), with Eric Clapton
- Memphis Blues (Downtown Music/Mercer Street, 2010), with Cyndi Lauper
- Wrote a Song for Everyone (Vanguard, 2013), with John Fogerty

== Singles ==
=== Chart hit compositions ===
Year	Song	Co-writer(s) with Toussaint, and notes	First chart recording	^{U.S. Pop}	^{U.S. R&B}	^{UK Singles Chart}	Other charting versions, and notes
1960	"Over You"	(Composition credited to Allen Orange)	Aaron Neville	-	21	-	-
1961	"Mother-in-Law"	-	Ernie K-Doe	1	1	29	1965: The Kingsmen on the album The Kingsmen Volume 3; 1973: Clarence Carter, #80 US pop, #24 R&B
1961	"I Like It Like That"	Chris Kenner	Chris Kenner	2	2	-	1965: The Dave Clark Five, #7 US pop 1966: The Kingsmen on the album The Kingsmen On Campus; 1975: Kenny Loggins & Jim Messina, #84 US pop
1961	"I Cried My Last Tear"	(Composition credited to Naomi Neville)	Ernie K-Doe	69	-	-	-
1961	"A Certain Girl"	(Composition credited to Naomi Neville)	Ernie K-Doe	71	-	-	1964: The Yardbirds (as a b-side); 1980: Warren Zevon, #57 US pop; from the album Bad Luck Streak in Dancing School
1962	"Java"	Alvin Tyler, Freddy Friday, Marilyn Schack	Floyd Cramer	49	-	-	First recorded by Toussaint (as Tousan) in 1958, on the album The Wild Sound of New Orleans; 1964: Al Hirt, #4 US pop The Beautiful South released a version as a b-side on the 1994 single "One Last Love Song".
1962	"Lipstick Traces (on a Cigarette)"	(Composition credited to Naomi Neville)	Benny Spellman	80	28	-	1965: The O'Jays, #48 US pop, #28 R&B
1963	"Pain in My Heart"	(Composition credited to Naomi Neville)	Otis Redding	61	11	-	First recorded in 1963 by Irma Thomas as "Ruler of my Heart". The writing credit on Redding's version was originally given to Redding himself, but was changed to Naomi Neville following an out of court settlement. 1965: The Rolling Stones on The Rolling Stones No. 2
1965	"Strain on My Heart"	(Composition credited to Allen Orange)	Roscoe Shelton	-	25	-	-
1965	"Whipped Cream"	(Composition credited to Naomi Neville)	Herb Alpert's Tijuana Brass	68	-	-	First recorded by The Stokes in 1965; Title track for the 1965 Herb Alpert album Whipped Cream & Other Delights
1965	"Ride Your Pony"	(Composition credited to Naomi Neville)	Lee Dorsey	28	7	-	-
1965	"I've Cried My Last Tear"	(Composition credited to Naomi Neville)	The O'Jays	94	-	-	-
1966	"Get Out of My Life, Woman"	-	Lee Dorsey	44	5	22	1966: The Paul Butterfield Blues Band on the album East-West; The Kingsmen on the album The Kingsmen On Campus; The Q65 (The Hague, Netherlands) on the album Revolution; The Leaves on the album Hey Joe; 1967: Iron Butterfly on the album Heavy; The Doors' version of "Get Out Of My Life Woman" was recorded in 1967 but only released in 2008 on the CD release of Live at the Matrix. 1972: Spirit on the album The Original Potato Land; The Jerry Garcia Band performed the song during the 1980s and 1990s and a live version of that song is on the Jerry Garcia Band live album of 1991. 1992: Gerry Rafferty on the album On a Wing and a Prayer; Nils Landgren & Joe Sample covered the song on the 2006 album Creole Love Song; The Derek Trucks Band on the live album Road Songs recorded during their 2009 tour.
1966	"Easy Going Fellow"	(Composition credited to Allen Orange)	Roscoe Shelton	-	32	-	-
1966	"Confusion"	-	Lee Dorsey	-	-	38	-
1966	"All These Things"	(Composition credited to Naomi Neville)	The Uniques	97	-	-	-
1966	"Working in the Coal Mine"	-	Lee Dorsey	8	5	8	1981: ("Working in a Coal Mine") Devo, #43 US pop, #76 UK. First released on the Heavy Metal soundtrack and as a bonus track for the Devo album New Traditionalists. 1985: The Judds on the album Rockin' with the Rhythm.
1966	"Holy Cow"	-	Lee Dorsey	23	10	6	1973: The Band on their Moondog Matinee album
1966	"Fortune Teller"	(Composition credited to Naomi Neville)	The Hard Times	97	-	-	First recorded in 1962 by Benny Spellman as the b-side of "Lipstick Traces (on a Cigarette)"; 1966: The Throb, Top 5 in Adelaide, Brisbane, Melbourne and Sydney. 2007: Robert Plant and Alison Krauss on the album Raising Sand.
1967	"My Old Car"	Bill Backer	Lee Dorsey	97	-	-	-
1967	"Nearer to You"	-	Betty Harris	85	16	-	-
1967	"Go-Go Girl"	-	Lee Dorsey	62	31	-	-
1968	"Can You Hear Me"	-	Lee Dorsey	-	-	53	-
1969	"Everything I Do Gonh Be Funky (From Now On)"	-	Lee Dorsey	95	33	-	Most later versions use the spelling "...Gonna...."
1969	"It's Hard to Get Along"	Joe Simon (Co-credited to Allen Orange)	Joe Simon	87	26	-	-
1970	"Yes We Can"	-	Lee Dorsey	-	46	-	1973: ("Yes We Can Can") The Pointer Sisters, #11 US pop, #12 R&B
1970	"Greatest Love"	-	Judy Clay	-	45	-	-
1970	"Hand Clapping Song"	Ziggy Modeliste, Leo Nocentelli, George Porter Jr. (Co-credited to Naomi Neville)	The Meters	89	26	-	-
1973	"Whoever's Thrilling You (Is Killing Me)"	-	Rufus	-	40	-	-
1973	"Freedom for the Stallion"	-	The Hues Corporation	63	-	-	First recorded by Lee Dorsey in 1972. 1972:Boz Scaggs on his album My Time
1974	"Play Something Sweet (Brickyard Blues)"	-	Three Dog Night	33	-	-	First recorded by Sylvester in 1972; 1974: Maria Muldaur on her album Waitress in the Donut Shop; Frankie Miller on his album High Life and as a single B. J. Thomas on his album, Longhorns & Londonbridges; Three Dog Night's version was included on the album Hard Labor.
1974	"I Keep On Lovin' You"	-	Z. Z. Hill	-	39	-	-
1975	"Shoorah! Shoorah!"	-	Betty Wright	-	28	27	1976: ("Shoora Shoora") Jenny Jackson, #75 R&B
1975	"Going Down Slowly"	-	The Pointer Sisters	61	16	-	-
1977	"A Dreamer of a Dream"	-	Candi Staton	-	37	-	-
1977	"Southern Nights"	-	Glen Campbell	1	-	28	First recorded by Toussaint in 1975 on the album Southern Nights
1978	"Night People"	-	Lee Dorsey	-	93	-	-
1978	"Girl Callin'"	-	Chocolate Milk	-	-	14	-
1978	"Fun Time"	-	Joe Cocker	43	-	-	-
1979	"Keep It Together (Declaration of Love)"	-	Rufus	-	16	-	-
1979	"Happiness"	-	The Pointer Sisters	30	20	-	-
1980	"Release (The Tension)"	-	Patti LaBelle	-	61	-	-
1981	"It's Raining"	(Composition credited to Naomi Neville)	Shakin' Stevens	-	-	10	First recorded by Irma Thomas in 1962
1983	"Do It Any Way You Want"	-	Robert Winters & Fall	-	39	-	On Casablanca Records
2007	"Here Come the Girls"	-	Ernie K-Doe	-	-	43	First released by K-Doe in 1970; 2008: ("Girls") Sugababes, #3 UK

==== Other compositions credited as Naomi Neville ====
- Real Man (1961)
- Do-Re-Mi (1961)
- Get Out Of My House (1962)
- Hey, Hey, Hey (1962)
- What Are You Trying To Do (1965)
- Meter Strut (1970)
- Hello My Lover (1972)
- I Did My Part (1981)
- Work, Work, Work (1995)

==== Other compositions credited as Clarence Toussaint ====
- True Love Never Dies (1961)

=== Other songs ===
- Aaron Neville recorded his song "Hercules" as a single in 1973. Boz Scaggs recorded "Hercules" for his album Slow Dancer. Paul Weller covered "Hercules" on the 2004 album Studio 150.
- Van Dyke Parks recorded "Occapella" and "Riverboat" on his second album Discover America in 1972. Ringo Starr recorded "Occapella" in 1974 on his album Goodnight Vienna. "Occapella" was also recorded by The Manhattan Transfer on their 1975 self-titled album.
- Little Feat recorded "On Your Way Down" on the album Dixie Chicken. The band performed the song during their 1974 tour; it appears as a bonus track on the re-release of their live album, Waiting for Columbus. The Tommy Talton Band recorded "On Your Way Down" in 2009 for the album Live Notes From Athens.
- The song "I'll Take a Melody" was released on the Frankie Miller album High Life in 1974, and on the Jerry Garcia solo album Reflections in 1976.
- Bonnie Raitt recorded "What Is Success" in 1974 on her Streetlights LP, and "What Do You Want the Boy to Do?" in 1975, on Home Plate.
- Bo Diddley recorded "Going Down" in 1972 on his album The London Bo Diddley Sessions.
- Boz Scaggs recorded "Hello My Lover" on his 1972 album My Time, and "What Do You Want the Girl to Do?" for his 1976 album Silk Degrees.
- Lowell George recorded "What Do You Want the Girl to Do?" for his 1979 solo album Thanks, I'll Eat it Here.
- Robert Palmer recorded "Sneakin' Sally Through The Alley" and "From A Whisper To A Scream" on the album Sneakin' Sally Through the Alley in 1974. Palmer also recorded "River Boat" for the album Pressure Drop in 1975, and "Night People" for the album Double Fun in 1978.
- Ringo Starr recorded "Sneakin' Sally Through The Alley" in 1977 on his album Ringo the 4th.
- Phish covered "Sneakin' Sally Through The Alley" as well as "On Your Way Down" numerous times in concert, dating as far back as 1985.
- Helen Reddy covered "Optimism Blues" on her 1981 album Play Me Out.
- Glen Campbell covered "You Will Not Lose" on his 1990 CD Walkin' In The Sun, as a duet with Steve Wariner.
- The Band released "You See Me" in 1998 on their Jubilation album.
- Widespread Panic covered "On Your Way Down" in 2009 and also at their 2010 New Orleans Jazz & Heritage Festival Performance. Trombone Shorty covered "On Your Way Down" on his 2010 CD Backatown, featuring Toussaint on piano.
- The song "I Feel Good", written under the pseudonym Naomi Neville and originally released in the US by Benny Spellman (1965), was a major hit in New Zealand for Larry's Rebels (1966) and later Citizen Band (Studio and live versions – 1978). It was recorded by Greg Anderson (Australia, 1966), Chants R&B (New Zealand 1966 live recording, released 2008), The Artwoods (UK, 1966 – Single on Decca by R&B band led by Art Wood, brother of Ron Wood. Members included Jon Lord, later of Deep Purple), The Kuhtze Band (New Zealand, 1987), The Gavin Burgess Band (1997 Live recording, released 2012).

=== Video ===
- Make It Funky! (2005)
- Putting the River in Reverse (DVD) (2006)
- Piano Players Rarely Ever Play Together (DVD, 1982), by Nell Palfi and Pauline Waring, Stevenson Productions 001 (Winner of over 20 Awards, also features Isidore "Tuts" Washington and Henry "Professor Longhair" Byrd)
- Music Conversation: Allen Toussaint & Larry Appelbaum
- Allen Toussaint: The Soul of New Orleans (DVD, 2011) American Music Research Foundation
