= Lipstick Traces =

Lipstick Traces may refer to:

- "Lipstick Traces (On A Cigarette)", a song first recorded by New Orleans singer Benny Spellman
- Lipstick Traces: A Secret History of the 20th Century, a non-fiction book by American rock-music critic Greil Marcus
- Lipstick Traces (A Secret History of Manic Street Preachers), a Manic Street Preachers album
- "Lipstick Traces", an instrumental track by UFO from the 1974 album Phenomenon
