= Mystery Train (book) =

1975 book by Greil Marcus

- First edition
- Author: Greil Marcus
- Cover artist: Paul May
- Language: English
- Genre: Music criticism Social history
- Published: 1st edition: 1975; New Edition: 1982; 6th edition: 2015
- Publisher: 1st edition: E. P. Dutton; 5th edition: Plume
- Publication place: United States
- Media type: paperback book
- ISBN: 978-0452289185

Mystery Train: Images of America in Rock 'N' Roll Music is a non-fiction book written in 1975 by Greil Marcus. It features critical essays centered on artists such as Elvis Presley, Sly Stone, Robert Johnson, and Randy Newman.

== Authorship ==
Greil Marcus, rock critic and columnist for Rolling Stone, and contributor to other publications, such as Creem, the Village Voice, and Artforum, wrote Mystery Train in 1975. In the prologue, he relates that the book "is no attempt at synthesis, but a recognition of unities in the American imagination that already exist." The writing, according to the author, took about "two years of doing nothing else."

Mystery Train, according to one reviewer, reflects on what could be called "the historical turn" that rock took at the close of the 60s, initiated by Bob Dylan and the Band, and followed through by everyone from Creedence Clearwater Revival to Randy Newman, the music moving "beyond rock'n'roll's teenage immersion in the present to an adult sophistication steeped in deep knowledge of rock's roots in blues and country and lyrics that likewise looked to the past for inspiration."

According to another reviewer, Marcus proceeds in his examination of American popular culture with the "democratic assumption" that Presley and Herman Melville are already cultural and political equals, and are, therefore, "in conversation with one another - having a dialogue about freedom and limits, innovation and tradition, American dreams and American obsessions." When the 2nd edition came out, Elvis had recently died, and Marcus was asked to amend the chapter relating to Elvis by putting everything in the past tense but he refused, because, he said, "Elvis' presence was so powerful, I felt he's always in the present tense."

Mystery Train opens with an episode on the Dick Cavett show, where Little Richard interrupts a disagreement between a writer and a critic and closes with a transcript of Jerry Lee Lewis arguing with producer Sam Phillips as they are setting up to record "Great Balls of Fire" in 1957.

== Critical reception ==
Frank Rich reviewed the book for The Village Voice and wrote that Marcus' "frame of reference is so vast that he never runs out of connections worth making between the music he loves and just about anything else that matters in American art and life.” David Itzkoff and Alan Light, in a 2005 critical roundup of music-related books, claimed that Mystery Train is "perhaps the finest book ever written about pop music." New York Times literary critic Dwight Garner stated in 2015 that "most critics and serious listeners think [Mystery Train]’s almost certainly the best book yet written about American music in general, and about rock in particular."

In 2011, Time magazine picked it among the "100 best and most influential [books] written in English since 1923."

== List of contents ==
- Author's note
- PROLOGUE
- ANCESTORS

- HARMONICA FRANK
- ROBERT JOHNSON

- INHERITORS

- THE BAND: Pilgrims' Progress

Crossing the Border / Stranger Blues / The Righteous Land / Even Stranger Blues / The Weight

- SLY STONE: The Myth of Staggerlee

Staggerlee / Sly Stone / Riot / Sly Versus Superfly / A Quiet Rebellion

- RANDY NEWMAN: Every Man Is Free

Pop / Newman's America, 1 / Newman's America, 2 / Newman's Failure

- ELVIS: Presliad

Fanfare / Hillbilly Music / Raised Up / The Rockabilly Moment / Elvis Moves Out / The Boy Who Stole The Blues / The Pink Cadillac / Elvis At Home / Mystery Train / Finale

- EPILOGUE
- NOTES AND DISCOGRAPHIES

== Similar works by the author ==
- Dead Elvis (1991), on the influence of Elvis Presley on American culture in the latter half of the 1970s.
- Invisible Republic (1997), on the creation and cultural importance of The Basement Tapes, a series of recordings made by Bob Dylan in 1967 in collaboration with the Hawks, who would subsequently become known as the Band.

== See also ==
- Music journalism
