= Lipstick Traces: A Secret History of the 20th Century =

1989 book by Greil Marcus

Lipstick Traces: A Secret History of the Twentieth Century
- First edition
- Author: Greil Marcus
- Language: English
- Genre: Nonfiction
- Publisher: Harvard University Press
- Publication date: 1989
- Publication place: United States
- Pages: 496
- ISBN: 0-674-53580-4
- Preceded by: Stranded: Rock and Roll for a Desert Island
- Followed by: Dead Elvis: A Chronicle of a Cultural Obsession

Lipstick Traces: A Secret History of the 20th Century (1989) is a non-fiction book by American rock-music critic Greil Marcus that examines popular music and art as a social critique of Western culture.

The book covers 20th century avant-garde art movements like Dadaism, Lettrist International and Situationist International and their influence on late 20th century countercultures and The Sex Pistols and punk movement. "This book does not pretend to be a history of any of the movements it addresses," the author writes (p. 414). "The events of the Free Speech Movement at the University of California, Berkeley, in 1964 "formed a standard against which I've judged the present and the past ever since . . . I never got over it . . . as an incomplete but indelible image of good public life" (p. 411).

A "soundtrack" to Lipstick Traces, compiling many of the songs referenced in the book, was released by Rough Trade Records in 1993.

The name "Lipstick Traces" can be traced to the 1962 Benny Spellman song “Lipstick Traces (on a Cigarette)”

In 1999, the book was adapted into a stage production by Rude Mechanicals (a.k.a. Rude Mechs) of Austin, TX. The play has been performed all across the United States- including a stint Off-Broadway in 2001- and in Salzburg, Austria. In 2005, the play was invited to join the New York Public Library's Dramatic Literature Archive.

The book also provided inspiration for the name of a compilation album of B-sides by the Welsh rock group Manic Street Preachers, entitled Lipstick Traces (A Secret History of Manic Street Preachers).
