= Action (Freddy Cannon song) =

Single by Freddy Cannon

from the album Action!
- B-side: "Beachwood City"
- Released: July 1965
- Genre: Rock and roll
- Length: 2:10
- Label: Warner Bros.
- Songwriter(s): Tommy Boyce, Steve Venet
- Producer(s): Dick Glasser

Freddy Cannon singles chronology
"In the Night" (1965)	"Action" (1965)	"Let Me Show You Where It's At" (1965)

"Action" is a song written by Tommy Boyce and Steve Venet, which was the theme song to the TV series Where the Action Is, and a 1965 hit for Freddy Cannon.
