= Where the Action Is =

- Title card
- Genre: Musical Rock 'N' Roll Variety
- Created by: Dick Clark (also host-announcer)
- Presented by: Linda Scott; Steve Alaimo
- Opening theme: "Action" by Freddy Cannon
- Country of origin: United States

Production
- Running time: 25 minutes (1965); 30 minutes (1965-1967)
- Production company: Dick Clark Productions

Original release
- Network: ABC
- Release: June 28, 1965 – March 31, 1967

Where the Action Is is a music-based television variety show that aired in the United States from 1965 to 1967. It was carried by the ABC network and aired each weekday afternoon. Created by Dick Clark as a spin-off of American Bandstand, Where the Action Is premiered on June 28, 1965. The show was another step in the then-current trend of entertainment programs that targeted the teenage audience by focusing on pop music, following in the footsteps of Shindig! (premiered in the fall of 1964, also on ABC) and Hullabaloo (premiered January 1965 on NBC). Dick Clark's voice could be heard doing the artist introductions, and he sometimes did filmed interviews.

== Background ==
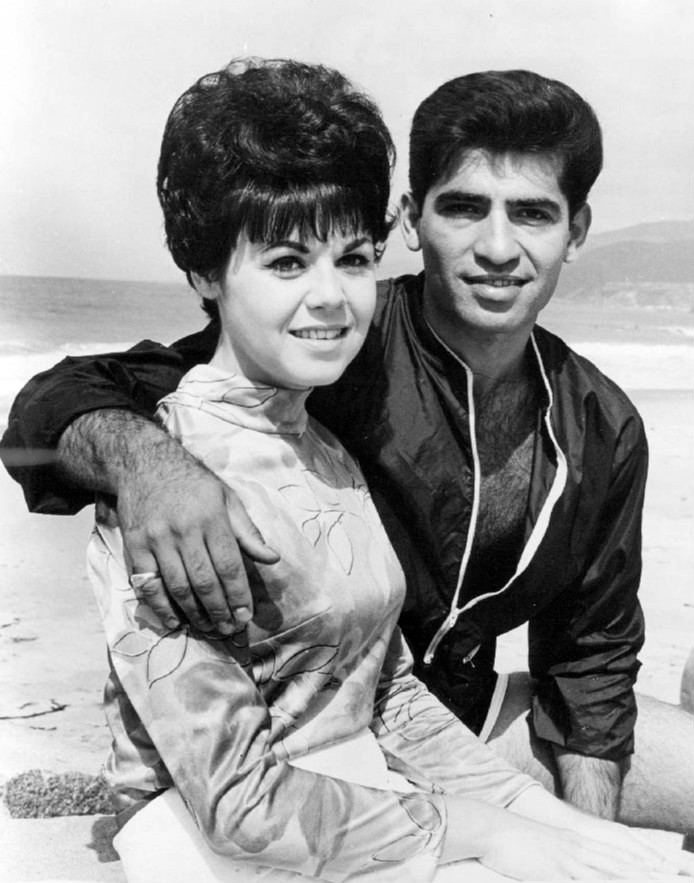
Linda Scott and Steve Alaimo, regulars on the show, pictured in 1966.

The show was hosted by Linda Scott and Steve Alaimo, who sang numbers between guest performances. Scott had a few hit singles as a teenager in the early 1960s; she was only 20 when "Action" premiered. Also appearing were Keith Allison (a Paul McCartney look-alike who later became a member of Paul Revere and the Raiders) and Laura Nyro. Typically, the show featured two or three performers lip-synching their recent hits in front of a audience of teenagers, and a dance segment featuring the Action dancers. There would occasionally be an interview segment. A few episodes featured only one performer, such as Herman's Hermits or James Brown.

Originally intended as a summer replacement and broadcast at 2 P.M. EDT, the show was successful enough for it to continue throughout the 1965–66 television season, with a change in time period to 4:30 P.M. Eastern time following the horror soap opera Dark Shadows. Both programs attracted a young audience who watched the shows after school. It was in black and white.

The show's theme song, "Action", became a hit single for Freddy "Boom Boom" Cannon, peaking on the charts at number thirteen in September 1965. Most of these black-and-white telecasts were taped at various locales in Southern California. A handful of segments were taped elsewhere around the US. The theme song was written by Steve Venet and Tommy Boyce. Later, Boyce co-wrote songs for The Monkees.

The program had its own stable of performers, most notably Paul Revere and the Raiders, who served as the de facto house band. Easily identified by their Revolutionary War costumes, the band had several Top 40 hits in the '60s thanks in part to the exposure they received on "Where The Action Is". Their lead singer, Mark Lindsay, with his ponytail, became a teenage idol due to the programme, gracing the covers of countless teen magazines. The Raiders also recorded the "Action" theme song for their 1965 album "Just Like Us" for which Dick Clark wrote the liner notes. When the group departed the show in 1966, they were replaced by The Robbs and The Hard Times. Other regular performers on Action included the dance troupe Pete Menefee and the Action Kids. Individual episodes featured a wide range of guest performers, as detailed below. Tina Mason was a regular singer being promoted by Dick Clark on the show. She met on the set and later married Phil Volk, the bass player for Paul Revere and the Raiders. They married on the second anniversary of the show's premiere, June 27, 1967.

The weekday program was cancelled on March 31, 1967, with the network giving its local affiliates the time slot. However, members of the program's mainstay band Paul Revere and the Raiders (with lead vocalist Mark Lindsay) hosted very similar follow-up shows: both Revere and Lindsay hosted Happening '68, a Saturday afternoon follow-up to American Bandstand, and a weekday version of the same show, It's Happening, from 1968 to 1969. Both shows were produced by Dick Clark's production company for ABC.

== Regulars ==
- Dick Clark (Host-Announcer. Except for a brief cameo at the beginning of the pilot and at the end of the final episode, he only appeared in off-camera voice-overs to introduce performers)
- Paul Revere and The Raiders (1965–1967)
- The Robbs (1966–1967)
- Keith Allison
- Steve Alaimo (Co-Executive Producer & Host)
- Tina Mason (Temporary Replaced: 1966)
- Linda Scott (Co-Hostess/Hostess: 1965-1966 & 1967)
- The Action Kids (1965–1967)
- The Knickerbockers (1966)
- The Hard Times (1966–1967)
- Don and the Goodtimes
- Tommy Roe

== Guest performers (partial list) ==
- Al Martino
- Aretha Franklin
- B.J. Thomas
- Barbara Lewis
- Barbara Mason
- Barry McGuire
- Ben E. King
- Bernadette Peters
- Bill Cullen (original host of The Price Is Right)
- Billy Joe Royal
- Billy Preston
- Billy Stewart
- Blues Magoos
- Bob Lind
- Bobby Freeman
- Bobby Fuller Four
- Bobby Goldsboro
- Bobby Hebb
- Bobby Rydell
- Bobby Vee
- Brenda Holloway
- Brenda Lee
- Brian Hyland
- Brook Benton
- Buck Owens
- Buffalo Springfield
- Captain Beefheart
- Chad & Jeremy
- Charlie Rich
- Cher
- Chet Baker
- Chris Montez
- Danny Hutton
- Dave Dee, Dozy, Beaky, Mick and Tich
- Davy Jones
- Dee Jay & The Runaways
- Dee Dee Sharp
- Del Shannon
- Desi Arnaz (as I Love Lucy's" Ricky Ricardo)
- Diane Renay
- Dick and Dee Dee
- Dino, Desi & Billy
- Dionne Warwick
- Don Grady
- Donovan
- Doris Troy
- Duane Eddy
- Dusty Springfield
- Eddie Hodges
- Eddie Holman
- Edwin Starr
- Five Americans
- Frankie Avalon
- Frankie Valli & The Four Seasons
- Freddie & the Dreamers
- Freddy Cannon
- Gale Garnett
- Gary Lewis & the Playboys
- Gary U.S. Bonds
- Gene Pitney
- Glen Campbell
- Gloria Jones
- Herman's Hermits
- Ike & Tina Turner
- Jackie DeShannon
- Jackie Lee
- Jackie Wilson
- James Brown & The Famous Flames
- James Darren
- James Keefer
- Jan & Dean
- Jimmie Rodgers
- Jimmy Clanton
- Jimmy Velvet
- Jo Ann Campbell
- Jody Miller
- Joe Tex
- Johnny Rivers
- Johnny Tillotson
- Jr. Walker & the All Stars
- Ketty Lester
- Patti LaBelle & the Bluebelles
- Laura Nyro
- Len Barry
- Lenny Welch
- Lesley Gore
- Lesley-Marie Colburn
- Little Anthony & The Imperials
- Little Richard
- Lou Christie
- Lou Rawls
- Love
- Major Lance
- Marianne Faithfull
- Martha and the Vandellas
- Marvin Gaye
- Mary Wells
- Maxine Brown
- Mel Carter
- Mickey Rooney, Jr.
- Mitch Ryder & the Detroit Wheels
- Neil Sedaka
- Nino Tempo and April Stevens
- Otis Redding
- Pamela Miller
- Paul Petersen
- Percy Sledge
- Peter & Gordon
- Petula Clark
- Pinkerton's Assorted Colours
- Question Mark & the Mysterians
- Ray Peterson
- Ray Stevens
- Ronnie Dove
- Rosey Grier
- Roy Clark
- Roy Head
- Roy Orbison
- Sam and Dave
- Sam the Sham & the Pharaohs
- Shadows of Knight
- Shirley Ellis
- Sir Douglas Quintet
- Smokey Robinson & The Miracles
- Sonny & Cher
- Stevie Wonder
- Strawberry Alarm Clock
- Terry Knight and the Pack
- The Action
- The Animals
- The Association
- The Beatles
- The Beau Brummels
- The Byrds
- The Castaways
- The Classics (Classics IV)
- The Cryin' Shames
- The Crystals
- The Cyrkle
- The Detergents
- The Dillards
- The Dixie Cups
- The Drifters
- The Everly Brothers
- The Fortunes
- The Four Tops
- The Grass Roots
- The Happenings
- The Hondells
- The Impressions
- The Kingsmen
- The Kingston Trio
- The Kinks
- The Knickerbockers
- The Left Banke
- The Lovin' Spoonful
- The Mamas & the Papas
- The McCoys
- Wayne Fontana & the Mindbenders
- The Miracles
- The Mojo Men
- The Moody Blues
- The Music Machine
- The Nashville Teens
- The Newbeats
- The Outsiders
- The Palace Guard
- The Razor’s Edge
- The Righteous Brothers
- The Rolling Stones
- The Rose Garden
- The Shangri-Las
- The Small Faces
- The Spencer Davis Group
- The Spinners
- The Standells
- The Statler Brothers
- The Strangeloves
- The Sunrays
- The Supremes
- The Swingin' Medallions
- The Temptations
- The 13th Floor Elevators
- The Tokens
- The Toys
- The Turtles
- The Velvelettes
- The Ventures
- The Vibrations
- The Vogues
- The Who
- The Yardbirds
- The Zombies
- Them
- Tommy Sands
- Toni Basil
- Unit 4 + 2
- Vic Dana
- The Walker Brothers
- We Five
- Wilson Pickett
