= The Hard Times (band) =

American folk rock band

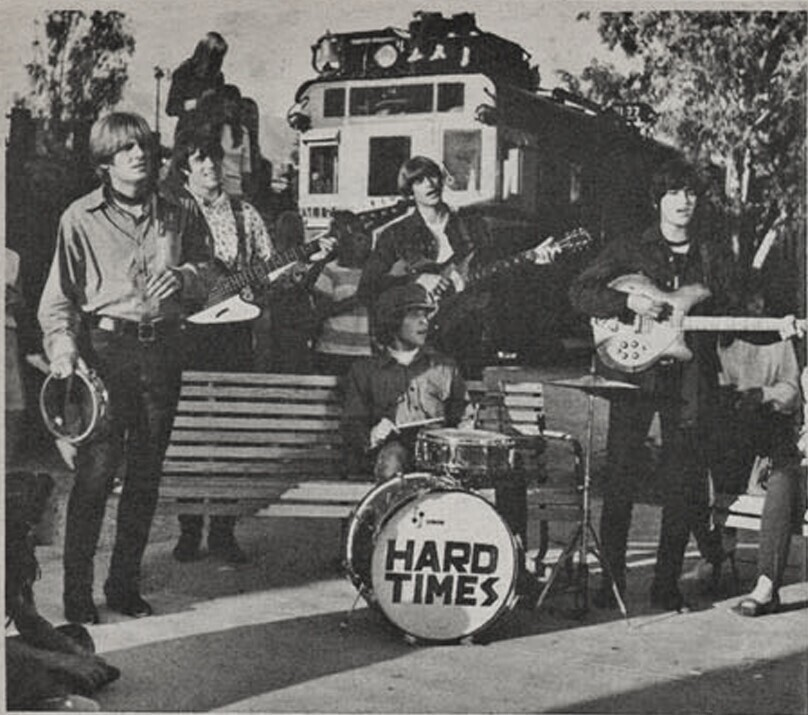
- The Hard Times in 1966

Background information
- Origin: San Diego, California, United States
- Genres: Folk rock; sunshine pop; psychedelic pop; garage rock
- Years active: 1965–1967
- Label: World Pacific
- Past members: Bill Richardson; Bob Morris; Rudy Romero; Paul Wheatbread; Lee Kiefer; Larry Byrom

The Hard Times were an American folk rock band formed in San Diego, California, in 1965. Combining elements of folk, sunshine pop, and light psychedelic pop, the group became a well-attended attraction on the Sunset Strip as house band to music venues such as the Whisky a Go Go. They managed to reach the Billboard Hot 100 with a cover version of Allen Toussaint's song "Fortune Teller" in 1966.

== Chronology ==
Founding member Bill Richardson (lead guitar) was originally in a quintet known as the Prophets. Disappointed by the group's lack of success, Richardson, along with fellow member Bob Morris (bass guitar), recruited singer-songwriter Rudy Romero (rhythm guitar, vocals), Paul Wheatbread (drums), and Lee Kiefer (tambourine) to form another band. Kiefer was inspired to name the group the Hard Times after the Josh White blues song of the same name.

They started developing a strong following in San Diego when manager Florence Stanley took interest to the Hard Times, and persuaded the group to relocate to Los Angeles. Performing at the music club the Sea Witch, the band honed their musicianship and became one of the more frequented attractions on the Sunset Strip. Their popularity earned them the opening slot at the Whisky a Go Go to kickoff concerts for Buffalo Springfield, the Doors, and Jimi Hendrix. Though the Hard Times did take the stage for several other clubs, it was at the Whisky a Go Go that the group was discovered by executives working for Dick Clark's music-based television program Where the Action Is. The band made numerous appearances on the show, resulting in a recording contract with World Pacific Records.

The band recorded two non-LP singles that did not receive much national notice, but are regarded as well-produced folk rock pieces, recorded in a similar vein as early Byrds music. The Hard Times charted just once on the Billboard Hot 100—albeit a minor hit as it only peaked at number 97—with a cover version of Allen Toussaint's song "Fortune Teller". It was the first rendition of the composition to reach the U.S. national charts. In 1967, the band released their sole album, Blew Mind; however it failed to be commercially successful. Music critic Jason Ankeny comments on the album's uneven sound, saying there is "a lot to scratch one's head about, as well, like the odd, overly baroque version of 'Candy Man' which opens this collection, a production approach that is also repeated on Hard Times' ill-advised cover of Donovan's 'Colours.' One can't help but wonder what might have happened if Romero-Richardson had been allowed to develop the band further on a second album, but that was not to be". Indeed, Blew Mind was perhaps hindered by the condition that session musicians recorded the instrumentals, and, in late 1967, the Hard Times disbanded.

Richardson and Larry Byrom (who had replaced Morris on bass) went on to form the psychedelic rock band, T. I. M. E. (Trust in Men Everywhere), recording two albums with the group. Richardson later managed San Diego movie theaters and fronted the Jose Sinatra and Troy Dante Inferno comedic lounge act. Wheatbread joined Gary Puckett and the Union Gap, Keifer became a sound engineer, and Romero released a solo album in 1972. In 2003, Rev-Ola Records reissued Blew Mind, including the band's non-LP singles as bonus tracks along with two Cass Elliot-produced tracks by the Richardson and Romero side-project New Phoenix.

== Discography ==
=== Singles ===
- "There'll Be a Time" b/w "You’re Bound to Cry" – (World Pacific 77816, Jan. 1966)
- "Come to Your Window" b/w "That’s All I’ll Do" – (World Pacific 77826, May 1966)
- "Fortune Teller" b/w "Goodbye" – (World Pacific 77851, Sep. 1966)
- "They Said No" b/w "Sad, Sad, Sunshine" – (World Pacific 77864, Feb. 1967)
- "Colours" b/w "Blew Mind" – (World Pacific 77873, Aug. 1967)

=== Albums ===
- Blew Mind (World Pacific WP-1867, 1967)
