= Putting the River in Reverse =

2006 documentary by Matthew Buzzell

Putting the River in Reverse is a 2006 documentary film about the first major recording session in New Orleans, United States, following Hurricane Katrina. It features Elvis Costello and Allen Toussaint. It was directed by Matthew Buzzell and premiered at the 2006 Full Frame Documentary Film Festival. It also played at the 2006 Tribeca Film Festival.
