= American Tunes =

Studio album by Allen Toussaint
- Released: June 10, 2016
- Recorded: May 20–21, 2013; October 1–3 & 5, 2015
- Genre: Blues, R&B, jazz
- Length: 51:31
- Label: Nonesuch
- Producer: Joe Henry

Allen Toussaint chronology
Songbook (2013)	American Tunes (2016)

American Tunes is the final recording from New Orleans jazz and R&B pianist Allen Toussaint, released on Nonesuch Records on June 10, 2016. It was produced by Joe Henry and includes music from a 2013 solo session at the pianist's home studio in New Orleans and an October 2015 session featuring musicians Bill Frisell, Charles Lloyd, Greg Leisz, Jay Bellerose, and David Piltch, with special guest vocalist Rhiannon Giddens and pianist Van Dyke Parks, recorded in Los Angeles the month before Toussaint died.

The album title is taken from the 1973 Paul Simon song "American Tune," which Toussaint performs on the album. Also included are songs written or recorded by Toussaint, Professor Longhair (Henry Roeland Byrd), Duke Ellington, Bill Evans, and Fats Waller.

Allen Toussaint was due to play with Paul Simon in a New Orleans benefit concert to celebrate the 30th anniversary of New Orleans Artists Against Hunger and Homelessness, an organization Toussaint co-founded, on December 8, 2015; instead, Simon played the concert without Toussaint in tribute to the musician. "Allen Toussaint brought New Orleans to the world," Simon has said, "and he left before he could bless us with the complete genius of his music."

== Track listing ==
1. "Delores' Boyfriend" (Allen Toussaint) – 3:35
2. "Viper's Drag" (Thomas "Fats" Waller) – 3:18
3. "Confessin' (That I Love You)" (Doc Daugherty, Ellis Reynolds & Al Neiburg) – 2:52
4. "Mardis Gras in New Orleans" (Henry Roeland "Roy" Byrd) – 3:15
5. "Lotus Blossom" (Billy Strayhorn) – 4:20
6. "Waltz for Debby" (Bill Evans) – 3:17
7. "Big Chief" (Earl King) – 2:15
8. "Rocks in My Bed" (Duke Ellington) – 4:40
9. "Danza, Op. 33" (Louis Moreau Gottschalk) – 3:27
10. "Hey Little Girl" (Henry Roeland "Roy" Byrd) – 2:38
11. "Rosetta" (Earl "Fatha" Hines) – 4:10
12. "Come Sunday" (Duke Ellington) – 5:12
13. "Southern Nights" (Allen Toussaint) – 3:33
14. "American Tune" (Paul Simon) – 4:59

== Personnel ==
- Allen Toussaint – piano and vocals
- Jay Bellerose – drums and percussion
- Bill Frisell – electric guitar
- Greg Leisz – weissenborn
- Charles Lloyd – tenor saxophone
- David Piltch – upright bass
- Adam Levy – gut-string guitar
- Cameron Stone – cello
- Amy Shulman – harp
- Rhiannon Giddens – vocals
- Van Dyke Parks – second piano and orchestral arrangement
- Ryan Freeland - recording engineer, mixer
