= The Throb =

Australian garage rock band (1965–1967)

- Origin: Sydney, New South Wales, Australia
- Genres: Garage rock, R&B, rock, surf
- Years active: 1965–1967
- Labels: Polydor, Albert, EMI/Parlophone
- Past members: John Bell; Denny Burgess; Peter Figures; Marty Van Wynk; Bob Daisley; Paul Wylde

The Throb were an R&B-based garage rock band from Sydney, Australia, who were active in the mid-1960s. Despite their short tenure, they achieved a brief moment of success, scoring a major hit in Australia with a cover version of "Fortune Teller", originally recorded by Benny Spellman, and which had previously been covered by The Rolling Stones. But, perhaps the song for which they have become best-remembered is the brooding lament "Black", a feedback-drenched rendition of the traditional folk song, "Black Is the Color of My True Love's Hair", which they released in August that year, with lesser success, although it became a minor hit in Sydney.

== History ==
The Throb formed in Sydney in 1965 with the line up of John Bell on lead vocals and rhythm guitar, Denny Burgess (ex-Mystery Men) on bass guitar and vocals, Peter Figures (ex-Geoff Doyle and The Resonettes, The No Names) on drums and Martin Van Wyk (ex-Geoff Doyle and The Resonettes, The No Names) on lead guitar.

Figures and Van Wyk had worked together in The Resonettes in the early 1960s as a surf instrumental band. When they signed with Polydor Records in 1964 they changed the band's name to The No Names and issued two beat music singles, "She Is Mine", and a cover version of The Coasters hit Charlie Brown. By December 1965 The No Names became a R&B and rock band called The Throb.

The Throb signed with Albert Productions and label owner, Ted Albert, recommended a cover version of "Fortune Teller" as their debut single. In February 1966 it was issued by EMI/Parlophone and soon charted at No.4 in Sydney and No. 2 in Melbourne. It also charted at No.4 in Adelaide and was a number-one hit in Brisbane. According to the Australian Chart Book 1940–1969 (2005) this equates to a national chart position of No.4. The group had become a "hot live draw on the discotheque circuit".

The band reworked an English folk song, "Black Is the Color of My True Love's Hair", as a "mournful, demonic" tune, which was released as their second single, "Black". It reached the Top 40 in Sydney but did not chart in other capital cities. Van Wyk left to join The Soul Agents while The Throb continued as a three-piece until October, when Burgess left to form his own group, Honeybunch. Bell and Figures recruited Bob Daisley (ex-Dennis Williams and the Delawares, Gino Affair) on bass guitar and Paul Wylde on organ and piano. The Throb disbanded in January 1967 when Figures joined The Square Circle.

Bell became a builder and ran a plastering firm. By 1969 Figures had joined Jeff St John & Yama and was later in various other groups. In 1972 Denny Burgess joined The Masters Apprentices, alongside his brother Colin. Van Wyk was in the Marty Rhone Band and also had a career as a songwriter.

== Discography ==
=== Singles ===
- "Fortune Teller" (1966) AUS No. 4
- "Black" AUS No. 42
