= Invisible Republic (book) =

1997 book by Greil Marcus

Invisible Republic: Bob Dylan's Basement Tapes
- First edition
- Author: Greil Marcus
- Language: English
- Subject: Bob Dylan, The Basement Tapes, Anthology of American Folk Music
- Genre: Non-fiction, Music history
- Publisher: Henry Holt and Company
- Publication date: 1997 (Revised 2001)
- Publication place: United States
- Media type: Print (hardcover and paperback)
- Pages: 286
- ISBN: 0805033939

Invisible Republic: Bob Dylan's Basement Tapes (1997) is a book by music critic Greil Marcus (born 1945) about the creation and cultural importance of The Basement Tapes, a series of recordings made by Bob Dylan in 1967 in collaboration with the Hawks, who would subsequently become known as the Band.

In 2001, Picador reissued the book under the title The Old, Weird America, a term coined by Marcus to describe the often eerie country, blues, and folk music featured on the 1952 Anthology of American Folk Music. In his opinion, the sensibility of Anthology is reflected by the Basement Tapes recordings. The term has been revived via the musical genre called New Weird America.

== Content ==
Marcus quotes Robbie Robertson’s memories of recording the Basement Tapes: "[Dylan] would pull these songs out of nowhere. We didn't know if he wrote them or if he remembered them. When he sang them, you couldn't tell." Marcus called these songs "palavers with a community of ghosts." He suggests that "these ghosts were not abstractions. As native sons and daughters they were a community. And they were once gathered in a single place: on the Anthology of American Folk Music, a work produced by a 29-year-old of no fixed address named Harry Smith." Marcus argues Dylan's basement songs were a resurrection of the spirit of Anthology, originally published by Folkways Records in 1952, a collection of blues and country songs recorded in the 1920s and 1930s, which proved very influential in the folk revival of the 1950s and 1960s. Anthology, initially titled American Folk Music, was reissued by Smithsonian Folkways as a box set of compact disc in the same year as the book's publication, with portions of the book excerpted as liner notes.

Marcus links the First Great Awakening, the folk music revival of the 1950s, the Civil Rights Movement and the Battle of Matewan in West Virginia with Bob Dylan's 1966 tour with the Hawks.
