= Lipstick Traces (on a Cigarette) =

Song by Benny Spellman (1962)

Single by Benny Spellman
- B-side: "Fortune Teller"
- Released: 1962
- Recorded: 1962
- Genre: R&B
- Length: 2:23
- Label: Minit 644
- Songwriter: Naomi Neville
- Producer: Allen Toussaint

Benny Spellman singles chronology
"Darling No Matter Where" (1960)	"Lipstick Traces (on a Cigarette)" (1962)	"Love Is Universal" (1962)

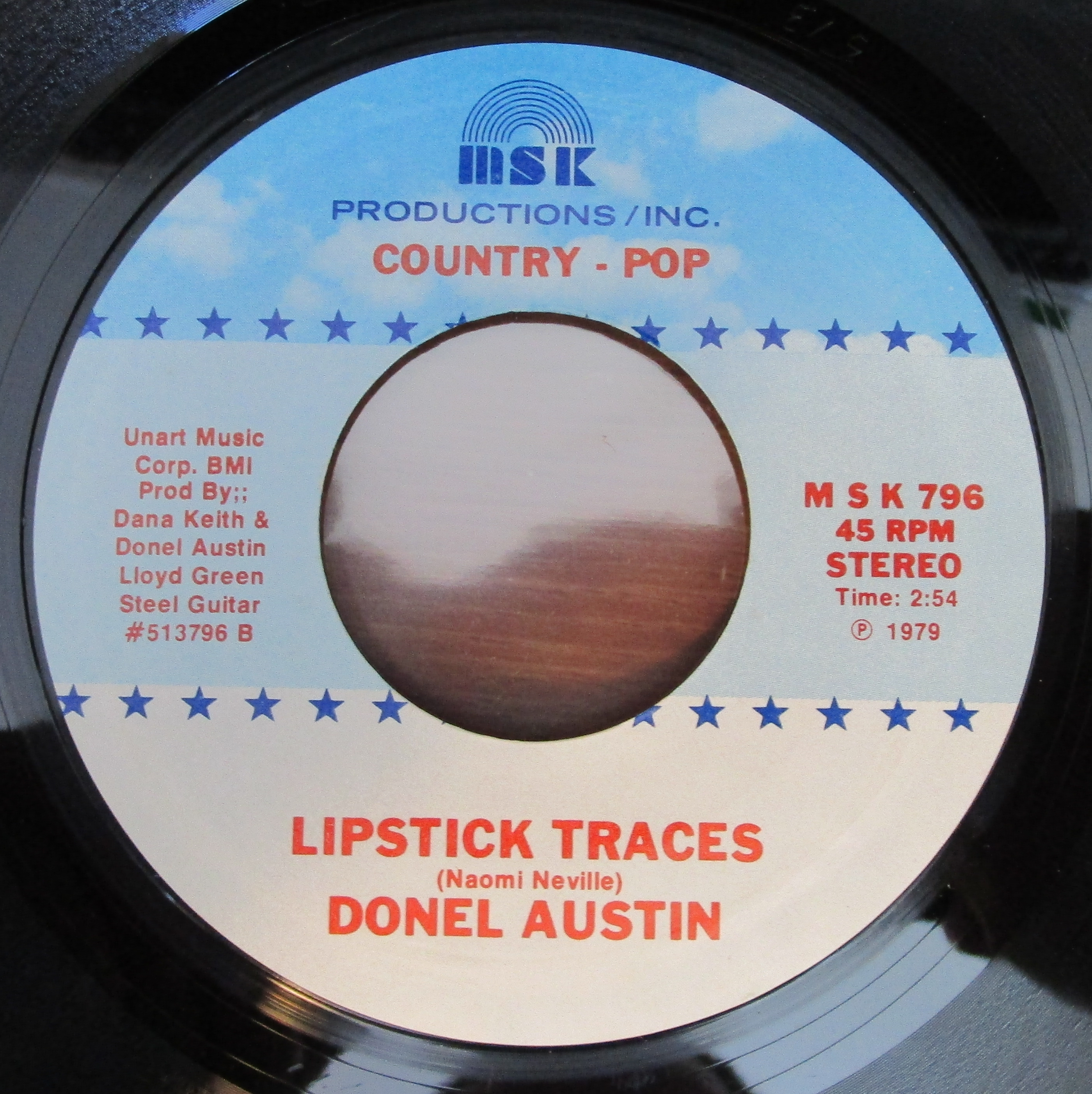
Donel Austin - Lipstick Traces

"Lipstick Traces (on a Cigarette)" is a song first recorded by New Orleans singer Benny Spellman in 1962. It was written by Allen Toussaint under the pseudonym Naomi Neville. The song became Spellman's only hit record, peaking at number 28 on the Billboard R&B chart and number 80 on the Billboard Hot 100 pop chart. The flip side of the single was "Fortune Teller", made famous by The Rolling Stones cover among others.

Toussaint explained the song's origin in an interview with journalist Terry Gross of National Public Radio: "Well, 'Lipstick Traces'...the guy, Benny Spellman, that sang the bass part on "Mother-In-Law" – he didn't know what it was worth at the time we were doing it, but when "Mother-In-Law" came out and sold, and went to number one, let's say, Benny Spellman that sang the bass part made sure that everyone within the sound of his voice got to know that he sang that part. And then he would go around – he would gig – based on [the fact that] he sang the low part on "Mother-In-Law". And he encouraged me...with much force, to write him a song that he could use that concept. And one result of that was the song 'Lipstick Traces'".

"Lipstick Traces (on a Cigarette)" was recorded in New Orleans on February 2, 1962. The background vocals were done by label mates Irma Thomas and Willie Harper.

== Cover versions ==
"Lipstick Traces (On a Cigarette)"
- A-side label

Single by Ringo Starr

from the album Bad Boy
- B-side: "Old Time Relovin'"
- Released: 18 April 1978
- Length: 3:01
- Label: Portrait
- Songwriter: Naomi Neville
- Producer: Vini Poncia

Ringo Starr singles chronology
"Tango All Night" (1978)	"Lipstick Traces (On a Cigarette)" (1978)	"Heart on My Sleeve" (1978)

"Lipstick Traces" has been covered by a number of artists. One of the earliest cover versions was by The O'Jays in 1965. (Imperial single 66102) Their version peaked on the R&B chart at No. 28, matching the R&B chart success of Spellman's original; and surpassed it on the Pop chart, peaking at No. 48. It was included on the 1965 album Comin' Through (Imperial 9290). The O'Jays' original five-member lineup of Walter Williams (who sang lead), Eddie Levert, William Powell, Bobby Massey and Bill Isles, performed the song on a 1965 telecast of ABC-TV's "Shivaree".

The American Breed covered the song on their 1967 self-titled debut album. Ringo Starr's cover, from his 1978 album Bad Boy, was released as a US single (backed with "Old Time Relovin'") on April 18, 1978. (Note: US Portrait 6-70015) Other artists who have covered the song include Amazing Rhythm Aces, Donel Austin, The Beautiful South, Alex Chilton, Snooks Eaglin, Frankie Ford and Delbert McClinton. Joe Krown's instrumental version appears on his 2007 album Old Friends.

== In popular culture ==
The song was the basis for the main title of Greil Marcus' book Lipstick Traces: A Secret History of the 20th Century.
