= Connected (Allen Toussaint album) =

Studio album by Allen Toussaint
- Released: 1996
- Studio: Sea-Saint
- Genre: Jazz, funk
- Label: NYNO
- Producer: Allen Toussaint, Clarence "Reginald" Toussaint

Allen Toussaint chronology
Mr. New Orleans (1994)	Connected (1996)	A New Orleans Christmas (1997)

Connected is an album by the American musician Allen Toussaint, released in 1996. It was released through NYNO Records, a label cofounded by Toussaint, and was his first new album in almost 20 years. Toussaint supported the album with a North American tour.

== Production ==
Produced by Toussaint, the album was recorded at his Sea-Saint Studios, with his son, Reginald, contributing as Connected's engineer. The album is a collection of original songs written by Toussaint. Toussaint had been working on the album for many years; he was prodded by Reginald to finish it.

== Critical reception ==
Professional ratings
Review scores
Source	Rating
AllMusic	4.5/5 stars
Robert Christgau	(choice cut)
The Encyclopedia of Popular Music	3/5 stars
MusicHound R&B: The Essential Album Guide	3.5/5 stars
Pittsburgh Post-Gazette	3/4 stars

The Pittsburgh Post-Gazette called the album "a sometimes rollicking, sometimes touching, always first-rate collection of love songs." Newsday wrote that Connected "mixes laid-back New Orleans rhythms with a sweet, smooth pop sound ... In addition to several ballads and some jazz-funk tunes, there is one distinctly '90s touch: 'Computer Lady', a sly ode to online romance." Robert Christgau singled out "Computer Lady" for praise.

The Washington Post panned Toussaint's "dull voice that has a cramped range," but thought that "there are a few gems among the new tunes, most notably the ballads 'If I Leave' and 'Sweet Dreams'." The Dallas Morning News opined that "the album's best tracks—'Do the Do', 'Funky Bars', 'All of It'—rekindle the jazzy New Orleans funk he helped invent in the mid-'60s with Art Neville and other future members of the Meters." The Boston Herald listed Connected as one of the 10 best albums of 1996, deeming it "timeless piano funk."

AllMusic called the album "fresh new funk and roll from the city where American music has always stretched to new levels."

== Track listing ==
No.	Title	Length
1.	"Pure Uncut Love"
2.	"Do the Do"
3.	"Computer Lady"
4.	"Get Out of My Life, Woman"
5.	"We're All Connected"
6.	"Sweet Dreams"
7.	"Funky Bars"
8.	"Ahya"
9.	"If I Leave"
10.	"Aign Nyee"
11.	"In Your Love"
12.	"Oh My"
13.	"All of It"
14.	"Wrong Number"
15.	"Rolling with the Punches"
