= Fortune Teller (song) =

Single by Benny Spellman
- A-side: "Lipstick Traces (on a Cigarette)"
- Released: 1962
- Genre: R&B
- Length: 2:12
- Label: Minit 644
- Songwriter: Naomi Neville
- Producer: Allen Toussaint

Benny Spellman singles chronology
"That's All I Ask of You" (1961)	"Fortune Teller" (1962)	"Every Now and Then" (1962)

Official audio
- "Fortune Teller" on YouTube

"Fortune Teller" is a song written by Allen Toussaint under the pseudonym Naomi Neville and first recorded by Benny Spellman. It was issued in 1962 as B-side of the single "Lipstick Traces (on a Cigarette)" on Minit Records (Cat 644).

It tells the story of a young man who is pleased to learn from a fortune teller that he will find love "When the next sun arrives". Next day he returns, angry that nothing has happened, but falls in love with the fortune teller. They get married and are as "happy as we could be", and he gets his "fortune told for free".

== Cover versions ==
Many artists have covered the song, including the Rolling Stones, the Hollies, the Stellas, the Who, Iggy Pop, Tony Jackson and the Vibrations, the Iguanas, and the S. The only version to reach the Billboard Hot 100 chart was one by the San Diego band the Hardtimes, which charted in late 1966, reaching number 97. It was included on the October 2007 album Raising Sand, by Robert Plant and Alison Krauss.

The song was also a hit in Australia, recorded by the Throb; released in February 1966 and charted in the top 5 in Adelaide, Brisbane, Melbourne and Sydney.

The song is included as a part of a medley performed by Allen Toussaint of some of his hits in the 2005 documentary film Make It Funky!, which presents a history of New Orleans music and its influence on rhythm and blues, rock and roll, funk and jazz.
