= Greil Marcus =

American rock critic and journalist (born 1945)

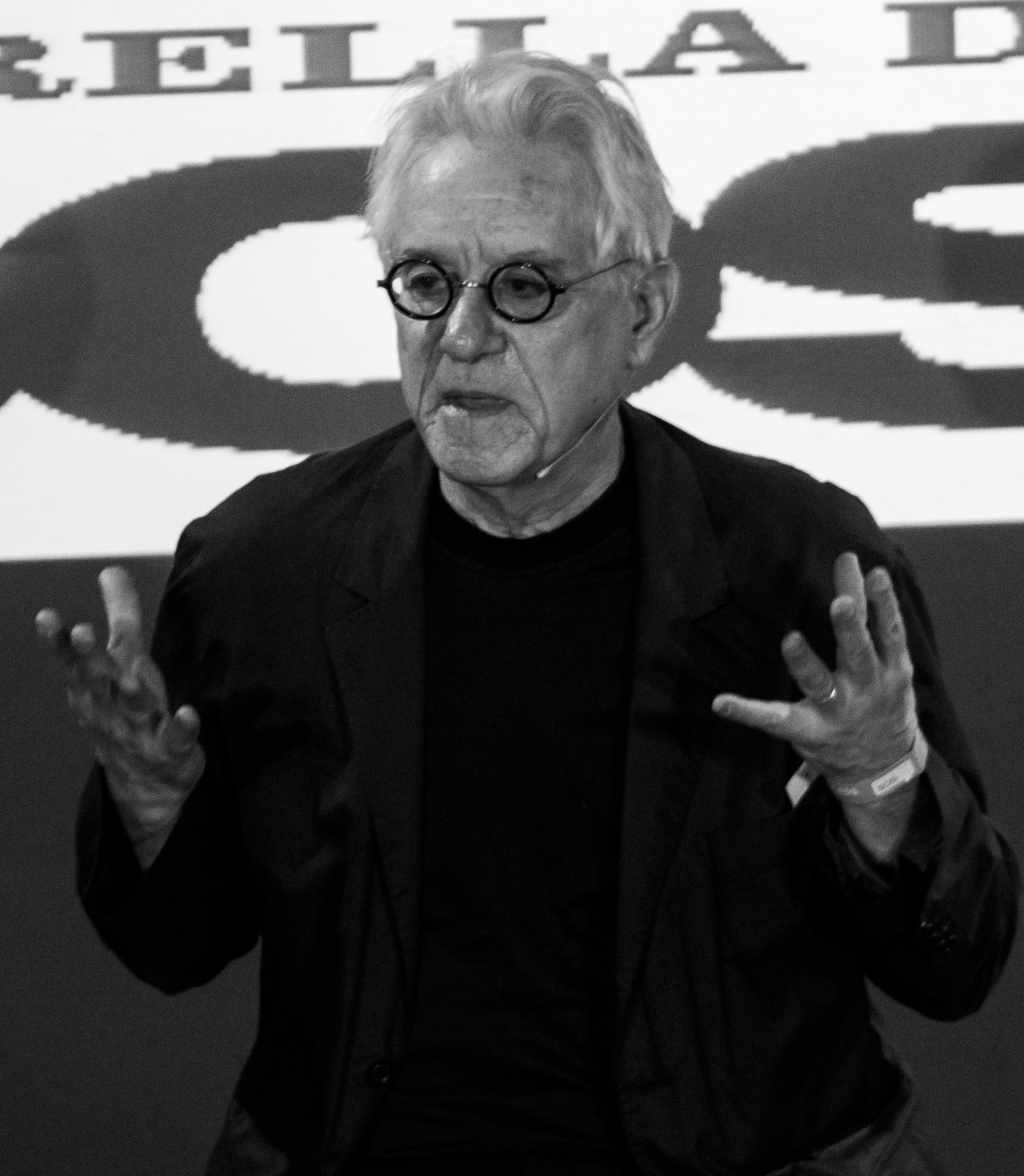
- Marcus at Festival SOS 4.8 in Murcia, 2014
- Born: Greil Gerstley; June 19, 1945 (age 81); San Francisco, California, U.S.
- Occupations: Author, critic, journalist
- Known for: Rock critic for Rolling Stone, Creem, the Village Voice, and Pitchfork
- Spouse: Jenny Marcus (m. 1966)

Greil Marcus (né Gerstley; born June 19, 1945) is an American author, music journalist and cultural critic. He is notable for producing scholarly and literary essays that place rock music in a broader framework of culture and politics.

== Biography ==
Marcus was born Greil Gerstley in San Francisco, California, the only son of Greil Gerstley and Eleanor Gerstley (née Hyman). Marcus is Jewish. His father, a naval officer, died in December 1944, when a Philippine typhoon sank the USS Hull, on which he was serving as second-in-command. Admiral William Halsey had ordered the U.S. Third Fleet to sail into Typhoon Cobra "to see what they were made of," and, despite the crew's urging, Gerstley refused to disobey the order, arguing that there had never been a mutiny in the history of the U.S. Navy and that "somebody had to die". The incident inspired the novel The Caine Mutiny. Eleanor Gerstley was three months pregnant when her husband died. In 1948, she married Gerald Marcus, who adopted her son and gave the boy his surname. Greil Marcus has several half-siblings.

His wife is Jennelle Marcus (née Berstein).

Marcus earned an undergraduate degree in American studies from the University of California, Berkeley, where he also undertook graduate studies in political science. He often cited as a major influence a Berkeley political science professor, Michael Rogin, of whom he said: "That course had more to do with putting me on the path I've followed ever since, for good or ill, than anything else."

He has been a rock critic and columnist for Rolling Stone (where he was the first reviews editor) and other publications, including Creem, the Village Voice, Artforum, and Pitchfork. From 1983 to 1989, he was on the board of directors of the National Book Critics Circle. Since 1966 he has been married to Jenny Marcus, with whom he has two daughters. Marcus' daughter Emily died on January 31, 2023 of cancer.

His book Mystery Train (published in 1975 and in its sixth revised and updated edition in 2015) is notable for placing rock and roll in the context of American cultural archetypes, from Moby-Dick to The Great Gatsby to Stagger Lee. Marcus's "recognition of the unities in the American imagination that already exist" inspired countless rock journalists. On August 30, 2011, Time magazine published a list of its selection of the 100 best nonfiction books since 1923, when the magazine was first published; Mystery Train was on the list, one of only five books dealing with culture and the only one on the subject of American music. Writing for The New York Times, Dwight Garner said, "Mystery Train is among the few works of criticism that can move me to something close to tears. It reverberated in my young mind like the E major chord that ends the Beatles' "A Day in the Life."

His next book, Lipstick Traces: A Secret History of the 20th Century (1989), stretched his trademark riffing across a century of Western civilization. Positing punk rock as a transhistorical cultural phenomenon, Marcus examined philosophical connections between subjects as diverse as medieval heretics, Dada, the Situationists, and the Sex Pistols.

Marcus published Dead Elvis, a collection of writings about Elvis Presley, in 1991, and Ranters and Crowd Pleasers (reissued as In the Fascist Bathroom: Punk in Pop Music), an examination of post-punk political pop, in 1993.

Using bootleg recordings of Bob Dylan as a starting point, he dissected the American subconscious in Invisible Republic: Bob Dylan's Basement Tapes, published in 1997.

He writes the column "Elephant Dancing" for Interview and "Real Life Rock Top Ten" for The Believer. He occasionally teaches graduate courses in American Studies at the University of California, Berkeley, and teaches a lecture class, "The Old Weird America: Music as Democratic Speech – From the Commonplace Song to Bob Dylan", at the New School. During the fall of 2008, he held the Winton Chair in the College of Liberal Arts at the University of Minnesota, where he taught and lectured on the history of American pop culture.

His book When That Rough God Goes Riding: Listening to Van Morrison was published in March 2010. It focuses on "Marcus's quest to understand Van Morrison's particular genius through the extraordinary and unclassifiable moments in his long career". The title is derived from Morrison's 1997 song "Rough God Goes Riding".

He subsequently published Bob Dylan by Greil Marcus: Writings 1968–2010 (2010) and The Doors: A Lifetime of Listening to Five Mean Years (2011).

In 2012, the Los Angeles Review of Books published a 20,000-word interview with Marcus about his life by Simon Reynolds. A collection of his interviews, edited by Joe Bonomo, was published by the University Press of Mississippi in 2012.

== Bibliography ==
- Rock and Roll Will Stand (1969), editor
- Double Feature: Movies & Politics (1972), co-author with Michael Goodwin
- Mystery Train: Images of America in Rock 'n' Roll Music (1975, sixth edition 2015)
- Stranded: Rock and Roll for a Desert Island (1979), editor and contributor
- Psychotic Reactions and Carburetor Dung by Lester Bangs, edited by Greil Marcus (1987)
- Lipstick Traces: A Secret History of the 20th Century (1989)
- Dead Elvis: A Chronicle of a Cultural Obsession (1991)
- In the Fascist Bathroom: Punk in Pop Music, 1977–1992 (1993, originally published as Ranters & Crowd Pleasers)
- The Dustbin of History (1995)
- Invisible Republic: Bob Dylan's Basement Tapes (1997; also published as The Old, Weird America: Bob Dylan's Basement Tapes, 2001)
- Double Trouble: Bill Clinton and Elvis Presley in a Land of No Alternatives (2001)
- The Manchurian Candidate: BFI Film Classics, 68 (2002, revised edition 2020)
- The Rose & the Briar: Death, Love and Liberty in the American Ballad (2004), co-editor with Sean Wilentz
- Like a Rolling Stone: Bob Dylan at the Crossroads (2005)
- The Shape of Things to Come: Prophecy in the American Voice (2006)
- A New Literary History of America (2009), co-editor with Werner Sollors
- Best Music Writing 2009, 10th anniversary edition (2009), guest editor with Daphne Carr (series editor)
- Songs Left Out of Nan Goldin's Ballad of Sexual Dependency (lecture and essay) (2009)
- When That Rough God Goes Riding: Listening to Van Morrison (2010)
- Bob Dylan by Greil Marcus: Writings 1968–2010 (2011)
- The Old, Weird America: The World of Bob Dylan's Basement Tapes (2011)
- The Doors: A Lifetime of Listening to Five Mean Years (2011)
- Conversations with Greil Marcus (2012), edited by Joe Bonomo
- The History of Rock 'n' Roll in Ten Songs (2014)
- Three Songs, Three Singers, Three Nations (2015)
- Real Life Rock: The Complete Top Ten Columns, 1986–2014 (2015)
- Under the Red White and Blue: Patriotism, Disenchantment and the Stubborn Myth of the Great Gatsby (2020)
- Folk Music: A Bob Dylan Biography in Seven Songs (2022)
- What Nails It (2024)
