= Allen Toussaint =

American musician, songwriter and record producer (1938–2015)

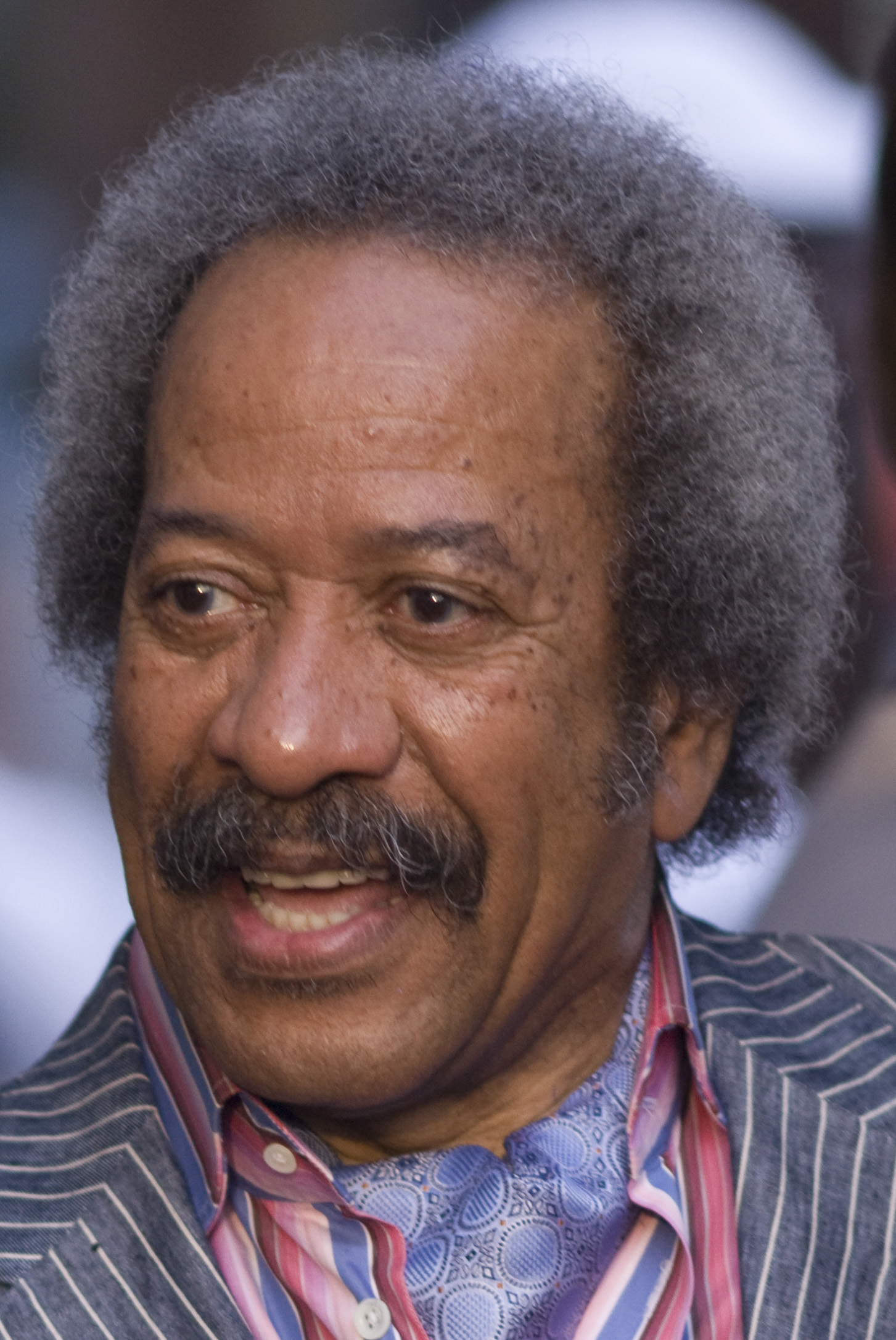
- Toussaint at the Freret Street Festival, New Orleans, 2009

Background information
- Also known as: Al Tousan
- Born: Allen Richard Toussaint; January 14, 1938; New Orleans, Louisiana, U.S.
- Origin: New Orleans, Louisiana, U.S.
- Died: November 10, 2015 (aged 77) Madrid, Spain
- Genres: R&B; soul; Southern soul; funk; blues; jazz
- Occupations: Musician; composer; arranger; record producer
- Instruments: Vocals; piano
- Years active: 1958–2015
- Labels: RCA Victor; Scepter; Minit; Instant; Reprise; Warner Bros.; Nonesuch; Elektra; Rounder

Allen Richard Toussaint (/ˈtuːsɑːnt/; January 14, 1938 – November 10, 2015) was an American musician, songwriter, arranger, and record producer. He was an influential figure in New Orleans rhythm and blues from the 1950s to the end of the century, described as "one of popular music's great backroom figures." Many musicians recorded Toussaint's compositions. He was a producer for hundreds of recordings: the best known are "Right Place, Wrong Time", by longtime friend Dr. John, and "Lady Marmalade" by Labelle.

== Biography ==
=== Early life and career ===
The youngest of three children, Toussaint was born in 1938 in New Orleans and grew up in a shotgun house in the Gert Town neighborhood, where his mother, Naomi Neville (whose name he later adopted pseudonymously for some of his works), welcomed and fed all manner of musicians as they practiced and recorded with her son. His father, Clarence, worked on the railway and played trumpet. Allen Toussaint learned piano as a child and took informal music lessons from an elderly neighbor, Ernest Pinn. In his teens he played in a band, the Flamingos, with the guitarist Snooks Eaglin, before dropping out of school. A significant early influence on Toussaint was the syncopated "second-line" piano style of Professor Longhair. Toussaint was raised Catholic.

After a lucky break at the age of 17, when he stood in for Huey "Piano" Smith at a performance with Earl King's band in Prichard, Alabama, Toussaint was introduced to a group of local musicians led by Dave Bartholomew, who performed regularly at the Dew Drop Inn, a nightclub on Lasalle Street in Uptown New Orleans. His first recording was in 1957 as a stand-in for Fats Domino on Domino's record "I Want You to Know", on which Toussaint played piano and Domino overdubbed his vocals. His first success as a producer came in 1957 with Lee Allen's "Walking with Mr. Lee". He began performing regularly in Bartholomew's band, and he recorded with Fats Domino, Smiley Lewis, Lee Allen and other leading New Orleans performers.

After being spotted as a sideman by the A&R man Danny Kessler, he initially recorded for RCA Records as Al Tousan. In early 1958 he recorded an album of instrumentals, The Wild Sound of New Orleans, with a band including Alvin "Red" Tyler (baritone sax), either Nat Perrilliat or Lee Allen (tenor sax), either Justin Adams or Roy Montrell (guitar), Frank Fields (bass), and Charles "Hungry" Williams (drums). The recordings included Toussaint and Tyler's composition "Java", which first charted for Floyd Cramer in 1962 and became a number 4 pop hit for Al Hirt (also on RCA) in 1964. Toussaint recorded and co-wrote songs with Allen Orange in the early 1960s.

=== Success in the 1960s ===
==== Minit and Instant Records ====
In 1960, Joe Banashak, of Minit Records and later Instant Records, hired Toussaint as an A&R man and record producer. He did freelance work for other labels, such as Fury. Toussaint played piano, wrote, arranged and produced a string of hits in the early and mid-1960s for New Orleans R&B artists such as Ernie K-Doe, Chris Kenner, Irma Thomas (including "It's Raining"), Art and Aaron Neville, The Showmen, and Lee Dorsey, whose first hit "Ya Ya" he produced in 1961.

The early to mid-1960s are regarded as Toussaint's most creatively successful period. Notable examples of his work are Jessie Hill's "Ooh Poo Pah Doo" (written by Hill and arranged and produced by Toussaint), Ernie K-Doe's "Mother-in-Law", and Chris Kenner's "I Like It Like That". A two-sided 1962 hit by Benny Spellman comprised "Lipstick Traces (on a Cigarette)" (covered by The O'Jays, Ringo Starr, and Alex Chilton) and the simple but effective "Fortune Teller" (covered by various 1960s rock groups, including The Rolling Stones, The Nashville Teens, The Who, The Hollies, The Throb, and The Searchers founder Tony Jackson). "Ruler of My Heart", written under his pseudonym Naomi Neville, first recorded by Irma Thomas for the Minit label in 1963, was adapted by Otis Redding under the title "Pain in My Heart" later that year, prompting Toussaint to file a lawsuit against Redding and his record company, Stax (the claim was settled out of court, with Stax agreeing to credit Naomi Neville as the songwriter). Redding's version of the song was also recorded by The Rolling Stones on their second album and was in the Grateful Dead's early repertoire. In 1964, "A Certain Girl" (originally by Ernie K-Doe) was the B-side of the first single release by The Yardbirds. The song was released again in 1980 by Warren Zevon, as the single from the album Bad Luck Streak in Dancing School; it reached 57 on Billboard's Hot 100. Mary Weiss, former lead singer of The Shangri-Las, released it as "A Certain Guy" in 2007. Linda Ronstadt released a jazzy version of "Ruler of my Heart" in 1998 on the album We Ran.

Toussaint credited about twenty songs to his parents, Clarence and Naomi, sometimes using the pseudonym "Naomi Neville". These include "Fortune Teller", first recorded by Benny Spellman in 1961, "Pain in My Heart," first a hit for Otis Redding in 1963, and "Work, Work, Work", recorded by The Artwoods in 1966. Alison Krauss and Robert Plant covered "Fortune Teller" on their 2007 album Raising Sand.

==== Sansu: Soul and early New Orleans funk ====
Toussaint was drafted into the United States Army in 1963 but continued to record when on leave. After his discharge in 1965, he joined forces with Marshall Sehorn to form Sansu Enterprises, which included a record label, Sansu, variously known as Tou-Sea, Deesu, or Kansu, and recorded Lee Dorsey, Chris Kenner, Betty Harris, and others. Dorsey had hits with several of Toussaint's songs, including "Ride Your Pony" (1965), "Working in the Coal Mine" (1966), and "Holy Cow" (1966). The core players of the rhythm section used on many of the Sansu recordings from the mid- to late 1960s, Art Neville and the Sounds, consisted of Art Neville on keyboards, Leo Nocentelli on guitar, George Porter Jr on bass, and Zigaboo Modeliste on drums. They later became known as The Meters. Their backing can be heard in songs such as Dorsey's "Ride Your Pony" and "Working in the Coal Mine", sometimes augmented by horns, which were usually arranged by Toussaint. The Toussaint-produced records of these years backed by the members of the Meters, with their increasing use of syncopation and electric instrumentation, built on the influences of Professor Longhair and others before them, but updated these strands, effectively paving the way for the development of a modern New Orleans funk sound.

=== 1970s to 1990s ===
"Mess of Love"
Words and music by Allen Toussaint, from John Mayall's 1976 album Notice to Appear

Toussaint continued to produce The Meters when they began releasing records under their own name in 1969. As part of a process begun at Sansu and reaching fruition in the 1970s, he developed a funkier sound, writing and producing for a host of artists, such as Dr. John (backed by the Meters, on the 1973 album In the Right Place, which contained the hit "Right Place, Wrong Time") and an album by The Wild Tchoupitoulas, a New Orleans Mardi Gras Indians tribe led by "Big Chief Jolly" (George Landry) (backed by the Meters and several of his nephews, including Art and Cyril Neville of the Meters and their brothers Charles and Aaron, who later performed and recorded as The Neville Brothers).

In the 1970s, Toussaint began to work with artists from beyond New Orleans artists, such as B. J. Thomas, Robert Palmer, Willy DeVille, Sandy Denny, Elkie Brooks, Solomon Burke, Scottish soul singer Frankie Miller (High Life), and southern rocker Mylon LeFevre. He arranged horn music for The Band's albums Cahoots (1971) and Rock of Ages (1972), as well as for the documentary film The Last Waltz (1978). Boz Scaggs recorded Toussaint's "Freedom for the Stallion" on his 1972 album My Time, as well as "What Do You Want the Girl to Do?" on his 1976 album Silk Degrees, which reached number 2 on the U.S. pop albums chart. The song was also recorded by Bonnie Raitt for her 1975 album Home Plate and by Geoff Muldaur (1976), Lowell George (1979), Vince Gill (1993), and Elvis Costello (2005). In 1976, he collaborated with John Mayall on the album Notice to Appear.

In 1973, Toussaint and Sehorn created the Sea-Saint recording studio in the Gentilly section of eastern New Orleans. Toussaint began recording under his own name, contributing vocals as well as piano. His solo career peaked in the mid-1970s with the albums From a Whisper to a Scream and Southern Nights. During this time, he teamed with Labelle and produced their acclaimed 1974 album Nightbirds, which contained the number one hit "Lady Marmalade". The next year, Toussaint collaborated with Paul McCartney and Wings for their hit album Venus and Mars and played on the song "Rock Show". In 1973, his "Yes We Can Can" was covered by The Pointer Sisters for their self-titled debut album; released as a single, it became both a pop and R&B hit and served as the group's introduction to popular culture. Two years later, Glen Campbell covered Toussaint's "Southern Nights" and carried the song to number one on the pop, country, and adult contemporary charts. Toussaint's song "I'll Take A Melody" figured permanently in the repertoire of the Jerry Garcia Band.

In 1987, Toussaint was the musical director of an off-Broadway show, Staggerlee, with a score composed of songs from his catalog, which ran for 150 performances. Like many of his contemporaries, Toussaint found that interest in his compositions was rekindled when his work began to be sampled by hip-hop artists in the 1980s and 1990s.

=== 2000s ===
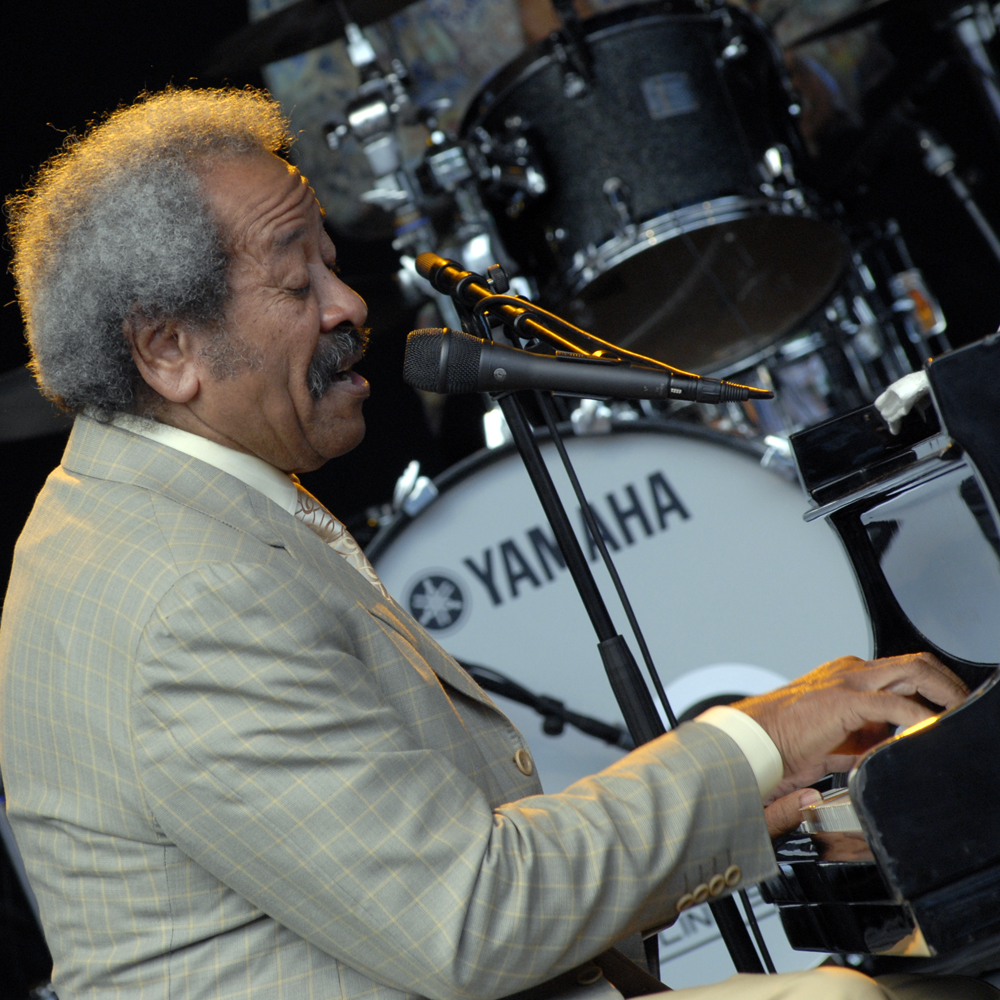
Toussaint performing in Stockholm in 2009

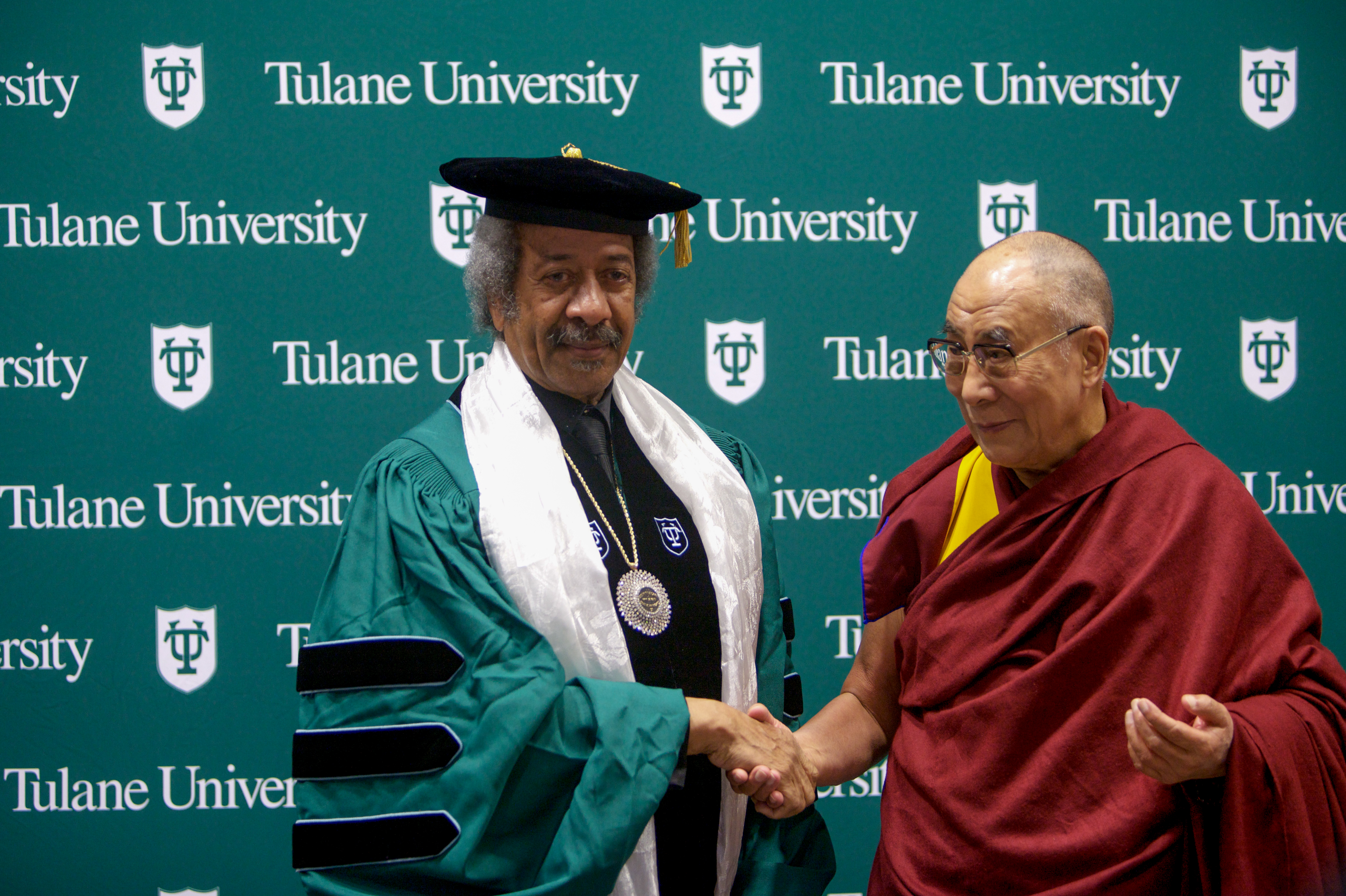
Toussaint with the Dalai Lama in 2013

Most of Toussaint's possessions, including his home and recording studio, Sea-Saint Studios, were lost during Hurricane Katrina in 2005. He initially sought shelter at the Astor Crowne Plaza Hotel on Canal Street. Following the hurricane, whose aftermath left most of the city flooded, he left New Orleans for Baton Rouge, Louisiana, and for several years settled in New York City. His first television appearance after the hurricane was on the September 7, 2005, episode of the Late Show with David Letterman, sitting in with Paul Shaffer and his CBS Orchestra. Toussaint performed regularly at Joe's Pub in New York City through 2009. He eventually returned to New Orleans and lived there for the rest of his life.

Toussaint is interviewed on screen, served as a musical director, led his band and appears in performance footage in the 2005 documentary film Make It Funky!, which presents a history of New Orleans music and its influence on rhythm and blues, rock and roll, funk and jazz. In the film, he performed a medley of his compositions "Fortune Teller", "Working in the Coal Mine" and "A Certain Girl". He also performed "Tipitina" in a piano duo with Jon Cleary, and accompanied Irma Thomas on "Old Records", Lloyd Price on "Lawdy Miss Clawdy", and Bonnie Raitt on "What Is Success".

The River in Reverse, Toussaint's collaborative album with Elvis Costello, was released on May 29, 2006, in the UK on Verve Records by Universal Classics and Jazz UCJ. It was recorded in Hollywood and at the Piety Street Studio in the Bywater, as the first major studio session to take place after Hurricane Katrina. In 2007, Toussaint performed a duet with Paul McCartney of a song by New Orleans musician and resident Fats Domino, "I Want to Walk You Home", as their contribution to Goin' Home: A Tribute to Fats Domino on Vanguard.

In 2008, Toussaint's song "Sweet Touch of Love" was used in a deodorant commercial for the Axe (Lynx) brand. The commercial won a Gold Lion at the 2008 Cannes Lions International Advertising Festival. In February 2008, Toussaint appeared on Le Show, the Harry Shearer show broadcast on KCRW. He appeared in London in August 2008, where he performed at the Roundhouse. In October 2008, he performed at Festival New Orleans at The O_{2} alongside acts such as Dr. John and Buckwheat Zydeco. Sponsored by Quint Davis of the New Orleans Jazz & Heritage Festival and Philip Anschutz, the event was intended to promote New Orleans music and culture and to revive the once lucrative tourist trade that had been almost completely lost following the flooding that came with Hurricane Katrina. After his second performance at the festival, Toussaint appeared alongside Louisiana Lieutenant Governor Mitch Landrieu.

Toussaint performed instrumentals from his album The Bright Mississippi and many of his older songs for a taping of the PBS series Austin City Limits, which aired on January 9, 2015. In December 2009, he was featured on Elvis Costello's Spectacle program on the Sundance Channel, singing "A Certain Girl". Toussaint appeared on Eric Clapton's 2010 album, Clapton, in two Fats Waller covers, "My Very Good Friend the Milkman" and "When Somebody Thinks You're Wonderful".

His late-blooming career as a performer began when he accepted an offer to play a regular Sunday brunch session at an East Village pub. Interviewed in 2014 by The Guardian′s Richard Williams, Toussaint said: "I never thought of myself as a performer.... My comfort zone is behind the scenes." In 2013 he collaborated on a ballet with the choreographer Twyla Tharp. In 2014, he collaborated with another ballet with David Parsons and The Parson Dance Company along with The New Orleans Ballet. Toussaint was a musical mentor to Swedish-born New Orleans songwriter and performer Theresa Andersson. Toussaint's two marriages ended in divorce.

== Death ==
Toussaint died in the early hours of November 10, 2015, in Madrid, Spain, while on tour. Following a concert at the Teatro Lara on Calle Corredera Baja de San Pablo, he suffered a ruptured abdominal aortic aneurysm at his hotel and was pronounced dead on his arrival at the hospital Fundación Jiménez Díaz (the circumstances of the death were investigated by Investigating Court No. 31 of Madrid.). He was 77. He had been due to perform a sold-out concert at the EFG London Jazz Festival at The Barbican on November 15 with his band and Theo Croker. He was also scheduled to play with Paul Simon at a benefit concert in New Orleans on December 8. His final recording, American Tunes, titled after the Paul Simon song, which he sings on the album, was released by Nonesuch Records on June 10, 2016.

He had three children with his former wife Betty Dell Weber and had several grandchildren. His children had managed his career in his last years.

Writing in The New York Times, Ben Sisario quoted Quint Davis, producer of the New Orleans Jazz and Heritage Festival: "In the pantheon of New Orleans music people, from Jelly Roll Morton to Mahalia Jackson to Fats—that's the place where Allen Toussaint is..." Paul Simon said, "We were friends and colleagues for almost 40 years.... We played together at the New Orleans jazz festival. We played the benefits for Katrina relief. We were about to perform together on December 8. I was just beginning to think about it; now I'll have to think about his memorial. I am so sad."

The Daily Telegraph described Toussaint as "a master of New Orleans soul and R&B, and one of America's most successful songwriters and producers", adding that "self-effacing Toussaint played a crucial role in countless classic songs popularised by other artists." He had written so many songs, over more than five decades, that he admitted to forgetting quite a few.

== Partial discography ==
- The Wild Sound of New Orleans (1958)
- Toussaint [AKA From a Whisper to a Scream] (1970)
- Life, Love and Faith (1972)
- Southern Nights (1975)
- Motion (1978)
- Mr. Mardi Gras: I Love a Carnival Ball Starring Allen Toussaint (1987)
- Connected (1996)
- A New Orleans Christmas (1997)
- Allen Toussaint's Jazzity Project: Going Places (2004)
- The Bright Mississippi (2009)
- American Tunes (2016)

== Awards and honors ==
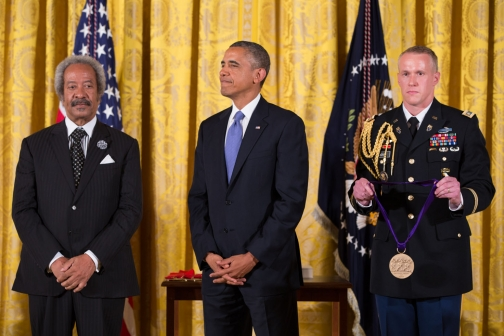
Toussaint receiving the National Medal of Arts in 2013

Toussaint was inducted into the Rock and Roll Hall of Fame in 1998, the Louisiana Music Hall of Fame in 2009, the Songwriter's Hall of Fame, and the Blues Hall of Fame in 2011.

In 2013, he was awarded the National Medal of Arts by President Barack Obama.

In 2016, Toussaint posthumously won the Pinetop Perkins Piano Player title at the Blues Music Awards.

In January 2022, the New Orleans City Council voted unanimously to rename one of the city's thoroughfares, Robert E. Lee Boulevard, to Allen Toussaint Boulevard in his honor.

In January 2025, the United States Postal Service released a forever stamp honoring Toussaint as part of its Black Heritage series.

Awards
First None recognized before	AMA Lifetime Achievement Award for Producer/Engineer; 2006	Succeeded by Jim Dickinson
