= Dead Elvis (book) =

1991 book by Greil Marcus

Dead Elvis: A Chronicle of a Cultural Obsession
- First edition
- Author: Greil Marcus
- Language: English
- Publisher: Doubleday
- Publication date: 1991
- Publication place: United States

Dead Elvis: A Chronicle of a Cultural Obsession (1991) is a non-fiction book by American rock-music critic Greil Marcus in which he examines the influence of Elvis Presley on United States culture in the latter half of the 1970s.

Marcus focuses primarily on the years immediately following the singer's death in 1977, in a series of essays (both new and previously published) exploring the Presley-related symbolism and iconography then manifesting in American culture, with a particular focus on punk rock.
