= Benny Spellman =

American R&B singer (1931–2011)

Background information
- Born: December 11, 1931; Pensacola, Florida, U.S.
- Died: June 3, 2011 (aged 79) Pensacola, Florida, U.S.
- Genres: R&B
- Occupation: Singer
- Instrument: Vocals
- Years active: 1960s
- Labels: Minit; Ace; Watch; Atlantic; Sansu

Benny Spellman (December 11, 1931 – June 3, 2011) was an American R&B singer, he was best known for the 1962 single "Lipstick Traces (on a Cigarette)" and its B-side "Fortune Teller", both written by Allen Toussaint (credited as Naomi Neville).

"Lipstick Traces" reached #28 on the U.S. Billboard R&B singles chart and #80 on the Billboard Hot 100, while "Fortune Teller" was later performed many other artists including The Who and The Rolling Stones. Spellman variously worked with Toussaint, Earl King ("Trick Bag"), Huey "Piano" Smith, Ernie K-Doe, Wilson Pickett, The Neville Brothers and The O'Jays.

== Biography ==
Spellman was born in Pensacola, Florida.

He took interest in football as a youth, but when he was attending Southern University in Baton Rouge, Louisiana, he started singing in Alvin Batiste's group.

In 1959, he met Huey "Piano" Smith and the Clowns in Florida when they were on tour. The group was in an automobile accident wrecking their car, and Spellman offered to drive them back to New Orleans. Subsequently, Smith offered Spellman to sing in the group which made him decide he would remain in New Orleans.

He sang backing vocals on Ernie K-Doe's number one hit record, "Mother in Law". He recorded a single, "The Word Game", on Atlantic Records in 1965, but he retired from music in 1968 to work as a public relations executive for Miller Beer.

He attempted to make a come back in the late 1980s, but it was cut short due to stroke he suffered, and he subsequently decided to move back to Pensacola.

In 1988, British Charly R&B issued a retrospective album of 16 of Spellman's recordings from the 1960s. (It was later released by Collectables Records in the U.S.) In 2009, he was inducted into the Louisiana Music Hall of Fame.

Spellman died of respiratory failure at an assisted living facility in Pensacola, Florida on June 2, 2011, at the age of 79.

== Personal life ==
Spellman was Catholic.

Benny Spellman was the father of New Orleans singer/entertainer Judy Spellman, who died in July of 2016.

== Discography ==
=== Compilation albums ===
Year	Album title	Label
1988	Fortune Teller	Charly R&B
2012	Fortune Teller	Shout!
n/a	Benny Spellman	Bandy (LP)

=== Singles ===
Year	Title (A-side, B-side)	Label
1960	"Life Is Too Short" b/w "Ammerette"	Minit 606
1960	"Darling, No Matter Where" b/w "I Didn't Know"	Minit 613
1961	"That's All I Ask Of You" b/w "Roll On Big Wheel"	Ace 630
1962	"Lipstick Traces (On A Cigarette)" b/w "Fortune Teller"	Minit 644
1962	"Every Now And Then" b/w "I'm In Love"	Minit 652
1962	"You Got To Get It" b/w "Stickin' Whicha' Baby"	Minit 659
1963	"Ammerette" b/w "Talk About Love"	Minit 664
1964	"Walk On Don't Cry" b/w "Please Mr. Genie"	Watch 6332
1964	"Someday They'll Understand" b/w "Slow Down Baby (Don't Drive Too Fast)"	Watch 6336
1965	"The Word Game" b/w "I Feel Good"	Atlantic 45-2291
1966	"It's For You" b/w "This Is For You My Love"	Alon 9031
1967	"Sinner Girl" b/w "If You Love Her"	Sansu 462
1968	"Foolish Man" b/w "Don't Give Up Love "	Mor. Soul MO 007
