= Jolie Laide =

American–Canadian rock band

- Genres: Rock
- Years active: 2020–present
- Labels: Oscar St.; Victory Pool
- Members: Nina Nastasia; Jeff MacLeod; Clinton St. John; Morgan Greenwood

Jolie Laide is an American–Canadian rock band consisting of American songwriter Nina Nastasia, and Canadian musicians Jeff MacLeod, Clinton St. John and Morgan Greenwood of The Cape May and Florida BC. Nastasia and MacLeod formed the band in 2020, and performed and recorded the majority of their self-titled debut album remotely during the COVID-19 lockdowns. The album was eventually released in 2023 via Oscar St. Records, a label formed by Kathryn Calder of The New Pornographers. It features MacLeod's Cape May and Florida BC bandmate Clinton St. John performing vocals on one song. The band briefly toured in support of the record, with St. John and remaining Florida BC member Morgan Greenwood appearing as part of their live band.

The band's second album, Creatures, followed in 2025, and was released by Victory Pool Records. St. John and Greenwood were invited to become official members of the band, with the former providing duet vocals on every song on the album and the latter introducing electronic instrumentation to the material.

== History ==
Jolie Laide was formed by Nina Nastasia and Jeff MacLeod. They originally met in the mid-2000s at Steve Albini's Electrical Audio studio in Chicago, where they were both recording albums. When Nastasia's regular backing band became unavailable to tour in support of her 2006 album On Leaving, Albini suggested MacLeod's band The Cape May appear as her opening act and her backing band for an American and European tour. Nastasia and MacLeod remained friends for several years afterwards, and reconnected in 2020 following the suicide of Nastasia's manager and partner Kennan Gudjonsson, with whom MacLeod had been developing an unspecified "writing project".

Nastasia stopped recording music after the release of her 2010 album Outlaster as a result of what she described as "unhappiness, overwhelming chaos, mental illness, and my tragically dysfunctional relationship with Kennan." She said her and Kennan's relationship contained "abuse, control and manipulation." Nastasia and MacLeod reconnected after Gudjonsson's suicide, saying: "I do know at some point, I was like, 'Please, send me anything.' I was away from music for so long and I had this new freedom to create stuff with other people." MacLeod began sending Nastasia backing tracks in 2020, during the COVID-19 lockdowns. She described the collaboration process as "very simple. [Jeff] would send me something, and it was a full song instrumentally. I felt very free to come up with ideas and lyrics and melodies." After the release of Nastasia's previous album Riderless Horse in 2022, she said she had been working with a Canadian band on a follow-up album. In August 2022, she confirmed she was working with MacLeod's band Florida BC.

Jolie Laide released their self-titled debut album on November 17, 2023, via Oscar St. Records, a label founded by Kathryn Calder of The New Pornographers. The album was recorded entirely by Nastasia and MacLeod, with MacLeod's Florida BC bandmate Clinton St. John providing vocals on the song "Death of Money". It was preceded by the release of three singles: "Pacific Coast Highway", "Why I Drink" and "Move Away Towns". Music videos were created for both "Pacific Coast Highway" and "Move Away Towns". The band performed their first live shows in 2023, with St. John and remaining Florida BC member Morgan Greenwood accompanying the duo for these performances.

Their second album, Creatures, was released on April 30, 2025, by Victory Pool Records. Nastasia and MacLeod initially began work on the record in a similar way to their debut, with the pair performing all instrumentation and sending their work to each other remotely. However, Nastasia said this process "did not work". Nastasia and MacLeod then invited St. John and Greenwood to become official members of the band. Every song on the album is a duet between Nastasia and St. John, with Greenwood introducing electronic instrumentation to the songs. Greenwood had previously collaborated with numerous electronic artists, including Aphex Twin, Azeda Booth, Baths, and Boards of Canada. "No Shape I Know" was released as the lead single from the album on February 13, followed a month later by "Holly". Three outtakes from Creatures were released in July on the non-album single "In the Low Light".

== Band name and musical style ==
Jolie Laide is a French term which loosely translates to "pretty ugly". Nastasia commented on the meaning of the name, saying: "Band names are the worst, right? Everybody's got a list of hundreds of names, and none of them are quite right. But I like the idea of that phrase. I guess what it means is a very specific type of beauty that has the elements of ugly in it. That's how I'm interpreting it. It's an unusual beauty that has an off-putting edge to it. The thing in art that I really love is that you can create this beautiful thing out of this horrendous thing."

Nastasia likened her interpretation of the band name to their music, saying she finds inspiration in "ugly subject matter, and trying to make something pretty out of those kinds of stories." Despite this, she said the material she composes with Jolie Laide is not "completely without hope, because writing that way almost ends up as wallowing or feeling sorry for yourself. I don't know if it's a conscious thing or not, but I always want to have a little bit of sunny in there." Killbeat Music described Jolie Laide as "an intriguing way to hear" Nastasia, noting she had "developed a tight, focused approach over the course of her active solo career." They said in contrast, her work with Jolie Laide "embraces sounds that would have been out of place on one of her own albums", elaborating: "Fittingly, as their name translates to ugly/pretty, the band's stories find grace and beauty in the imperfect."

== Band members ==
- Nina Nastasia – vocals and guitar (2020–present)
- Jeff MacLeod – backing vocals, guitar, bass, organ, drums (2020–present)
- Clinton St. John – vocals (2023–present)
- Morgan Greenwood – drum programming and synthesizer (2023–present)

== Discography ==
Albums

- Jolie Laide (2023)
- Creatures (2025)

Singles

- "Pacific Coast Highway" (2023)
- "Why I Drink" (2023)
- "Move Away Towns" (2023)
- "No Shape I Know" (2025)
- "Holly" (2025)
- "In the Low Light" (2025)

Music videos

- "Pacific Coast Highway" (2023)
- "Move Away Towns" (2023)
- "No Shape I Know" (2025)
- "Holly (Live Version)" (2025)
- "Holly" (2025)
