= Riderless Horse (album) =

Album by Nina Nastasia

Studio album by Nina Nastasia
- Released: July 22, 2022
- Length: 33:57
- Label: Temporary Residence Limited
- Producer: Nina Nastasia; Steve Albini; Greg Norman

Nina Nastasia chronology
Outlaster (2010)	Riderless Horse (2022)	Jolie Laide (2023)

Singles from Riderless Horse
- 1. "Just Stay in Bed" Released: April 4, 2022; 2. "This Is Love" Released: May 11, 2022; 3. "Afterwards" Released: June 14, 2022

Riderless Horse is the seventh studio album by American singer-songwriter Nina Nastasia. It was released by Temporary Residence Limited digitally and on CD on July 22, 2022, with the vinyl version following on November 4.

Her first new album since 2010's Outlaster, and the death of her long-time manager Kennan Gudjonsson in 2020, Riderless Horse was recorded and produced by Nastasia, Steve Albini and Greg Norman at a house in upstate New York. The record was inspired by Gudjonsson's suicide, and also the dysfunctional nature of their relationship, which Nastasia said contained "abuse, control and manipulation".

"Just Stay in Bed" was released as the first single from the album on April 4, 2022, with Nastasia beginning a tour supporting Scottish rock band Mogwai a day later. "This Is Love" was released as the second single on May 11, followed by "Afterwards" on June 14.

The album received critical acclaim upon its release, and multiple publications ranked it as one of the best albums of 2022.

== Background ==
Nastasia released her sixth studio album Outlaster in 2010, which was supported by a worldwide acoustic tour of club venues. Following the tour, Nastasia took an extended break from recording. She performed sporadically over the next several years, performing a one-off concert with Pixies bassist Kim Deal in New York on October 6, 2011, three solo concerts in the United Kingdom and Ireland in March and April 2012, a concert in Belfast as part of a tribute to late BBC DJ John Peel in September 2013, a one-off performance at The Watermill Center in New York on August 18, 2016, and at Electrical Audio's 20th anniversary party in Chicago on September 24, 2017. She performed lead vocals on "The Poisoner", a track on Daniel Knox's 2018 album Chasescene, and independently released the non-album single "Handmade Card" that same year.

== Recording and composition ==
The album was produced by Nastasia alongside Steve Albini and Greg Norman, at a house in upstate New York. She described Riderless Horse as her first solo album, in that it is her first record not to be produced by long-time manager and partner Kennan Gudjonsson, who died by suicide in January 2020. Nastasia explained that she stopped recording music after the release of Outlaster as a result of "unhappiness, overwhelming chaos, mental illness, and my tragically dysfunctional relationship with Kennan", saying that their 25-year relationship contained "abuse, control and manipulation."

Nastasia said she had always viewed creating music as a "positive outlet during difficult times", but said her relationship with Gudjonsson had deteriorated after the release of Outlaster to the point that recording new music "became a source of absolute misery." She ended her relationship with Gudjonsson on January 26, 2020; he committed suicide the following day. Nastasia said she "can only feel sadness and guilt" about his suicide, but "maybe I'll have other reactions to it later on." The album "documents the grief [about Gudjonsson's death], but it also marks moments of empowerment and a real happiness in discovering my own capability." She credited Albini and Norman for creating "exactly the right environment to work on this record. We all had meals together, cried, laughed, and told stories. It was perfect. It made me realize how much I love writing, playing and recording music."

== Release and promotion ==
Nastasia signed a record deal with Temporary Residence Limited, which digitally reissued her three Fat Cat Records albums – 2006's On Leaving, 2007's collaborative album with Jim White, You Follow Me, and Outlaster – in February 2022. She appeared as the opening act on a North American theater tour by Scottish rock band Mogwai, which began on April 5. The day before the tour began, "Just Stay in Bed" was released as the first single from Riderless Horse. "This Is Love" was issued as the second single on May 11, followed by "Afterwards" on June 14.

The album was released for digital download and on CD on July 22, 2022, with the vinyl release following on November 4. Two different editions of the vinyl were issued: a standard black 180-gram vinyl, and a limited edition clear vinyl with black ink splatter; the latter was limited to 1,500 copies worldwide. The cover art for the album was created by Elizabeth Neel. Nastasia performed her first headline show in a decade at Union Pool in Brooklyn on August 20, her only headline concert of 2022. Two songs recorded during the Riderless Horse sessions, "Whatever You Need to Believe" and "Too Soon", were released as a stand-alone single on November 3.

A new version of "You Were So Mad", recorded with Marissa Paternoster of Screaming Females, was released on February 9, 2023. The song was released in advance of Nastasia's appearance at Screaming Females' "Garden Party" festival on February 17. Nastasia embarked on a European tour between March and May, beginning in Lisbon on March 1, followed by dates in Italy, the United Kingdom, Ireland, Austria and Germany. A new version of "This Is Love", also featuring Paternoster, was issued as a single on May 4, backed by their previously released recording of "You Were So Mad". She performed more solo dates in the UK in August and September, and at the End of the Road Festival in Dorset from August 31 to September 3. She also appeared as the opening act for Wilco throughout the Western United States in October.

== Critical reception ==
Professional ratings
Aggregate scores
Source	Rating
AnyDecentMusic?	8.4/10
Metacritic	89/100
Review scores
Source	Rating
AllMusic	4/5 stars
Beats Per Minute	85%
The Daily Telegraph	5/5 stars
The Independent	4/5 stars
The Line of Best Fit	9/10
Mojo	5/5 stars
The Observer	5/5 stars
Pitchfork	7.8/10
The Skinny	4/5 stars
Uncut	8/10

Riderless Horse received positive reviews from music critics. At Metacritic, which assigns a normalized rating out of 100 to reviews from mainstream critics, the album has an average score of 89 out of 100, based on 13 reviews, indicating "universal acclaim". This is the highest score received by any of Nastasia's albums since Metacritic began collecting data with her 2003 album Run to Ruin. It ended 2022 as the eleventh-best reviewed album of 2022 on the website. Aggregator AnyDecentMusic? gave Riderless Horse 8.4 out of 10, based on their assessment of the critical consensus.

Multiple publications praised Nastasia's performance, as well as the quality of the production. AllMusic noted Nastasia performed the entirety of the record, saying she "sounds firmly in control at every moment", and said the production was "beautifully naturalistic, the sound of a musician alone in a room giving a powerful performance for the microphone, with all the details adding to its effect." The Independent noted the use of Soviet-era Russian microphones to record the album, and said the use of such technology helped emphasize the "awkward inches of air" between Nastasia's vocals and guitar. As a result, they said listeners could, instead of listening to an album, be "seated, skin prickling, in the front row of a tense, open-mic night". Uncut also praised Nastasia's performance, highlighting her vocals and guitar work while saying she "never flinches" in spite of the difficult lyrical content. Similarly, The Observer said the album could not be separated from its "tumultuous backstory", before calling it an "astonishingly moving record." The Telegraph said the album is "far from an easy listen for obvious reasons", and that hearing Nastasia "describe and attempt to understand these stark events is never less than compelling."

Other reviewers commended the quality of Nastasia's songwriting. The Line of Best Fit said the album consists of "genuinely beautiful songs", and said the strength of the songs were revealed over repeated listens. They praised the album's consistency as well, saying it was "pointless to try to pick highpoints on a record that is conceived more like a novel than a collection of individual tracks". Beats Per Minute said the album's backstory gave it an "at-times uncomfortable tension, like when your friend tells you details you may not have wanted to know but you know it's important to hear them." They also said virtually any lyrical couplet found on the album could be quoted as a "scarily blunt or emotionally candid observation." Similarly, Mojo praised the quality of songwriting, saying there was "scarcely a lyric that doesn't demand to be highlighted", and that the album "would be hard to listen to if it wasn't so lovely." They juxtaposed the album's backstory with Nastasia's performance, saying she "never makes you feel like an intruder. That's testament, after 12 long years, to Nastasia's skills, the undimmed songwriter able to transform all the pain and horror into something indelibly beautiful."

=== Year-end lists ===
Critic/Publication	Accolade	Rank	Ref.
Atchison Daily Globe	Best Albums of 2022	11	
Fast 'n' Bulbous	Singer-Songwriter Albums of 2022	—	
Les Inrockuptibles	100 Best Albums of 2022	61	
Metacritic	Best Reviewed Albums of 2022	11	
Mojo	Top 75 Albums of 2022	63	
Post Trash	The Best of 2022	—	
The Forty Five	The Best Albums of 2022	33	
The Line of Best Fit	The Best Albums of 2022	32	
Kara Manning from WFUV	Best of 2022	—	

== Track listing ==
All tracks are written by Nina Nastasia.

No.	Title	Length
1.	"Cork and Pour"	0:12
2.	"Just Stay in Bed"	2:12
3.	"You Were So Mad"	2:52
4.	"This Is Love"	3:10
5.	"Nature"	2:56
6.	"Lazy Road"	2:45
7.	"Ask Me"	3:40
8.	"Blind as Batsies"	2:35
9.	"The Two of Us"	2:37
10.	"Go Away"	2:18
11.	"The Roundabout"	2:09
12.	"Trust"	3:19
13.	"Afterwards"	2:34
14.	"Creek and Chimes"	0:32
Total length:		33:57

== Credits and personnel ==
Credits adapted from the liner notes of Riderless Horse.

- Field recorded in the home of Tod Lippy and David Hariton in New York.
- Mastered at Chicago Mastering Service by Bob Weston.

Personnel

- Nina Nastasia – vocals, acoustic guitar and production
- Steve Albini – engineering and production
- Elizabeth Neel – painting
- Greg Norman – assistant engineer and co-production
- Dave Thomas (as "DLT") – layout and design

== Charts ==
Chart performance for Riderless Horse
Chart (2022)	Peak position
UK Album Downloads (OCC)	43
UK Independent Albums (OCC)	26

== Release history ==
Release history and formats for Riderless Horse
Region	Date	Format	Label	Catalog #	Ref.
Various	July 22, 2022	CD; download; streaming	Temporary Residence Limited	TRR398CD	
Various	November 4, 2022	LP	Temporary Residence Limited	TRR398LP (standard) · TRR398LPC1 (limited)	
