= What She Doesn't Know =

Single by Nina Nastasia
- Released: February 25, 2008
- Recorded: 2006
- Genre: Folk pop; indie rock
- Label: Fat Cat
- Songwriter(s): Nina Nastasia
- Producer(s): Steve Albini

"What She Doesn't Know" is a 7-inch single by American singer-songwriter Nina Nastasia, released on February 25, 2008 by Fat Cat Records. The vinyl was limited to 500 copies worldwide. It peaked at number 49 on the UK Independent Singles Chart.

== Production ==
The two songs on "What She Doesn't Know" were recorded by Steve Albini in Chicago during the sessions for Nastasia's 2006 album On Leaving. The title track features drumming by Jay Bellerose, who has previously drummed on The Blackened Air and On Leaving. The B-side "Your Red Nose" features drumming by Jim White, who collaborated with Nastasia for 2007's You Follow Me. "What She Doesn't Know" had been performed as early as 2003, five years before its eventual release.

== Critical reception ==
The single was released to positive reviews, with Jamie Rowland of Penny Black Music calling the two songs "brilliant examples of folk songwriting." Psychedelic Folk described the A-Side as a "simple but powerful song." Tobias Kahn of The Skinny called the A-side "beautiful", but said that it "fades away too quickly."

== Track listing ==
All songs written by Nina Nastasia.

1. "What She Doesn't Know" – 2:20
2. "Your Red Nose" – 1:49

== Charts ==
Chart (2008)	Peak position
UK Independent Singles (OCC)	49
