= Jolie Laide (album) =

Album by Jolie Laide

Studio album by Jolie Laide
- Released: November 17, 2023
- Studio: Cinquantacinque, Chicago; Child Stone, Calgary
- Length: 28:19
- Label: Oscar St.

Jolie Laide chronology
Jolie Laide (2023)	Creatures (2025)

Nina Nastasia chronology
Riderless Horse (2022)	Jolie Laide (2023)	Creatures (2025)

Singles from Jolie Laide
- 1. "Pacific Coast Highway" Released: September 6, 2023; 2. "Why I Drink" Released: October 4, 2023; 3. "Move Away Towns" Released: November 8, 2023

Jolie Laide is the debut album by American–Canadian rock band Jolie Laide, a band consisting of American singer-songwriter Nina Nastasia and Canadian musician Jeff MacLeod of The Cape May and Florida BC. MacLeod's The Cape May bandmate Clinton St. John performs leads vocals on the song "Death of Money". The album was released on vinyl and as a digital download by Kathryn Calder's Oscar St. Records on November 17, 2023. Three songs were released as singles from the album: "Pacific Coast Highway", "Why I Drink" and "Move Away Towns". Music videos were also created for "Pacific Coast Highway" and "Move Away Towns".

== Background and recording ==
The album is a collaboration between singer-songwriter Nina Nastasia and Florida BC and The Cape May guitarist Jeff MacLeod, who first met in the mid-2000s at Steve Albini's Electrical Audio studio in Chicago. Nastasia released her first album in twelve years, Riderless Horse, in 2022. She said she stopped recording music after 2010's Outlaster because of her "tragically dysfunctional" relationship with her partner and manager Kennan Gudjonsson. Nastasia ended her relationship with Gudjonsson on January 26, 2020. The following day, he committed suicide.

Nastasia and MacLeod reconnected after Gudjonsson's suicide. MacLeod began sending Nastasia backing tracks during the COVID-19 lockdowns. She recalled: "I do know at some point, I was like, 'Please, send me anything.' I was away from music for so long and I had this new freedom to create stuff with other people. So it was definitely influenced by what he was sending me because what he was sending me had such a landscape to it. It sounded like I could hear a movie attached to it."

Nastasia announced in May 2022, one month after the release of Riderless Horse, that she was creating material with a Canadian band. Three months later, she confirmed the band she was working with was Florida BC. She described the album's recording process as "very simple", saying MacLeod would send her songs that were "full song[s] instrumentally. I felt very free to come up with ideas and lyrics and melodies." All of MacLeod's instrumentation was recorded at Child Stone Studio in Calgary, Canada, while Nastasia's vocals and acoustic guitar were recorded at Cinquantacinque in Chicago. Her work at Cinquantacinque was engineered by Tim Midyett of Silkworm and Bottomless Pit, with Nastasia saying her work there was recorded using microphones stolen from Steve Albini. Florida BC vocalist Clinton St. John provided vocals on "Death of Money".

== Composition and style ==
Many of the lyrics on the album were inspired by Nastasia's childhood growing up near North Vine Street in Hollywood, Los Angeles. The album was written concurrently with Riderless Horse. After years of living in New York City, Nastasia said MacLeod's music reminded her of her childhood, and said "pretty much the whole record to me sounded like the West Coast." She said the lyrical theme of the album was a sense of feeling "trapped in misery", saying this was inspired by her relationship with Kennan Gudjonsson.

"Pacific Coast Highway" is named after the eponymous highway in California. Nastasia said that during her youth, she spent "many more miles than I can count on the Pacific Coast Highway", and that the highway "represents to me the freedom that comes with youth and the pure joy that comes with being unafraid." Billboard described the song as possessing a "stormy foundation, with a cracked guitar-and-drums arrangement that threatens to explode, although Nastasia also communicates a calmness while extolling the peace and freedom of her subject."

"Move Away Towns" was inspired by Nastasia's relationship with Gudjonsson, explaining that the two were "together constantly". She said the song is about being "with someone and you're not tied to anything, you're not tied to that actual person, you're not tied to a place, you're kind of drifting. These characters are kind of grifters. You don't have a job, you don't have anything. You're just kind of running around free. It was so appealing to me for so long. It almost feels unnatural to be tied to one place or person." She also said the track "captures the moments of blissful freedom before the dust inevitably settles and what was once excitement and ease turns to dullness, resentment and hard work." BrooklynVegan said the song's backing track finds the duo in "soft, dreamy territory."

Nastasia said "Away Too Soon" and "Why I Drink" were songs inspired by feeling "trapped in your misery", but said they contained a "back and forth, certainly that I was feeling like wanting to never die or anything, but just being kind of overwhelmed and consumed" by her relationship with Gudjonsson. "Death of Money" relates to "super-romantic ideas of relationships, whether they're dark or light, they're just like this romantic extreme." MacLeod wrote the lyric "Old joy, wanting for nothing but good weather". "My Darling" is a murder ballad, while "God of Gamblers" is about being in a relationship with a narcissist. The lyric of "Isolation View" deals with heroin use, while the lyric of album closer "Blue as Blue" refers to a relationship "that is just killing you".

== Release and promotion ==
"Pacific Coast Highway" was released as a single and music video on September 6, 2023. Nastasia said the music video was inspired by childhood nostalgia. "Why I Drink" was released as a single on October 4, followed by "Move Away Towns" on November 8. A music video for the latter was also released the same day. The album was released on vinyl and digitally on November 17, by Kathryn Calder's Oscar St. Records.

== Critical reception ==
Professional ratings
Review scores
Source	Rating
Pitchfork	7.4/10

Emma Madden of Pitchfork described the album as "a kind of travelogue that traces the line between freedom and empty aimlessness" as well as "a lonesome, deliberate meditation on memory, freedom, and loss". Madden found that it "has a clear narrative and novelistic form" and "by the album's middle, romantic disequilibrium gives way to the volatility of alcohol. MacLeod's guitar grows hazier, Nastasia's voice more lethargic".

Montreal Rocks described Jolie Laide as "a rare occasion when an album not only captures the essence of an artist's journey but also stands as a testament to their resilience and artistic evolution", saying the album's "soundscape is a complex tapestry woven with Nastasia's emotive vocals and MacLeod's versatile guitar work." They said the album differs from her previous work because the "guitar takes a central role", explaining that MacLeod provided riffs that are "not just accompaniments but conversations with Nastasia's vocals, sometimes harmonious, at other times discordant, reflecting the album's thematic journey from hope to disillusionment." They summarized by calling the album a "must-listen for anyone who appreciates music that delves deep into the human experience."

== Track listing ==
All tracks are written by Nina Nastasia and Jeff MacLeod.

Jolie Laide – Side A
No.	Title	Length
1.	"Pacific Coast Highway"	2:26
2.	"Move Away Towns"	3:52
3.	"Away Too Soon"	3:34
4.	"Why I Drink"	2:17
Total length:		12:07

Jolie Laide – Side B
No.	Title	Length
5.	"Death of Money"	3:15
6.	"My Darling"	2:25
7.	"God of Gamblers"	3:44
8.	"Isolation View"	2:45
9.	"Blue as Blue"	4:03
Total length:		16:12

== Credits and personnel ==
Credits adapted from the liner notes of Jolie Laide.

- Nina Nastasia's vocals and guitar recorded by Tim Midyett at Cinquantacinque, Chicago.
- All other recording by Chris Dadge at Child Stone Studios, Calgary.
- Mixed by Colin Stewart at The Hive Studios.
- Mastered by Bob Weston at Chicago Mastering Service.

Personnel

- Nina Nastasia – vocals and acoustic guitar
- Jeff MacLeod – backing vocals, guitar, bass, organ, drums, cover
- Clinton St. John – vocals on "Death of Money"
- Chris Dadge – additional percussion and engineering
- Stephen Burchill – layout and design, cover

== Release history ==
Release history and formats for Jolie Laide
Region	Date	Format	Label	Catalog #	Ref.
Worldwide	November 17, 2023	LP; download; streaming	Oscar St. Records	n/a	
