= Creatures (Jolie Laide album) =

Album by Jolie Laide

Studio album by Jolie Laide
- Released: April 30, 2025
- Studio: The Hive, Victoria
- Length: 40:49
- Label: Victory Pool
- Producer: Colin Stewart

Jolie Laide chronology
Jolie Laide (2023)	Creatures (2025)

Nina Nastasia chronology
Jolie Laide (2023)	Creatures (2025)	Songs for a World of Trouble (2025)

Singles from Creatures
- 1. "No Shape I Know" Released: February 13, 2025; 2. "Holly" Released: March 20, 2025

Creatures is the second studio album by American–Canadian rock band Jolie Laide, released on April 30, 2025, by Victory Pool Records. The band consists of American singer-songwriter Nina Nastasia, and Canadian musicians Jeff MacLeod, Clinton St. John and Morgan Greenwood of the band Florida BC. "No Shape I Know" was issued as the album's lead single on February 13, followed by "Holly" on March 20. Music videos were created for both songs.

== Background and recording ==
Jolie Laide's self-titled album was released in 2023, and was composed and recorded entirely by Nina Nastasia and Jeff MacLeod. Clinton St. John – the vocalist of MacLeod's bands The Cape May and Florida BC – performed vocals on one track on the album, "Death of Money". Nastasia and MacLeod initially began work on Creatures in a similar way, with the pair performing all instrumentation and sending their work to each other remotely. However, Nastasia said this process "did not work". She explained: "There were times when I wasn't hearing a full song. I'm pretty limited in that I can't really pick up a guitar and start doing crazy stuff on it. I'm not that kind of player. We would get together and go through what we had and it was loads of ideas, but it didn't have the same flow."

Nastasia and MacLeod then invited Florida BC's Clinton St. John and Morgan Greenwood to become official members of the band. Nastasia said they wanted St. John and Greenwood to contribute to the first album, but said: "Logistically, it didn't work out". St. John was in the midst of a divorce at the time. The quartet composed and recorded the majority of Creatures at producer Colin Stewart's The Hive Studio, in Victoria, British Columbia. MacLeod said Stewart provided "direction and ideas" for the material, and that Stewart was the "fifth member" of the band.

The lyrics on Creatures were written by Nastasia and St. John, who duet on every song on the album. She said when they were composing lyrics there were "funny experiences where he and I were working on the same song separately, and the little bits we'd come up with were like, 'Wait, we're going in different directions.' But we got into the studio and ended up using both parts." Greenwood, who worked with electronic musicians Baths, Azeda Booth, Boards of Canada and Aphex Twin, introduced electronic instrumentation to the material. He would occasionally delete MacLeod's guitars and drums entirely, replacing them with drum programming and synthesizer. Nastasia commended Greenwood's influence on the album, praising him for "coming in and sewing the pieces together with this weird thread of his electronic stuff. Somehow it all pulled together and we came out kind of shocked by how things ended up." She said the band now "feels like a complete thing. I mean, I think the first album already sounded that way but now it's at a new level."

Recording for the album completed sometime after Thanksgiving in 2023, with the final mixes completed in early 2024. The band recorded thirteen songs for Creatures, although three of those were excluded. Nastasia described recording the album as "one of the best experiences I have had recording." MacLeod said that when compared to their debut, Creatures is "a lot different, but there is a continuity. Nina doesn't believe in magic, but I kind of do. There was something mystical happening for sure."

== Composition and style ==
Creatures contains songs that Jeff MacLeod ascribed to a wide range of musical genres, including electronic pop, folk, post-punk and sludge. He also said the album contains tracks inspired by the music of Spaghetti Western films. The album begins with "Cheyenne", which MacLeod described as the song on Creatures that most closely resembles the material on their self-titled album. Killbeat Music said Nastasia's vocal "swims in a swirl of delay trails, enveloped by a storm of overdubbed toms". They praised St. John's "instantly evocative voice", saying he provided the "perfect foil" to Nastasia's vocal. They described subsequent track "Holly" as "a character study of two strangers rambling through a post-apocalyptic wasteland", saying the song is "awash in beautiful cascades of affected electric guitars, imbuing a gently psychedelic glow to the song's edges, while remaining grounded in a more familiar dusty, percussive rhythm."

Lyrically, "Murder Ballad" deals with themes of spirituality, fatalism, and existentialism, with Killbeat Music saying the song "confront[s] the notion that ghosts might actually exist even if God doesn't". Musically, the song is reminiscent of the work of Florida BC. The song contains "gently brushed, loping drums and St. John's signature emotive drawl", augmented by Nastasia's "equally world-weary vocals". MacLeod said "Wharwolf" was "originally demoed in a fairly traditional manner", but that the band "completely dropped it to the studs and rebuilt it, spending days in the studio tinkering". Killbeat Music said the song was an album highlight, describing it is a "tour de force of ideas and shifting moods". The song begins with drum programming and a "plaintive, bleak vocal from St. John", before "crash[ing] into an epic wall of guitars and propulsive drumming, before uncannily sliding into a glistening calm after the storm, Nastasia's reverb-drenched voice floating amidst sparse webs of guitar." They described the song as "a hell of a ride."

Killbeat Music said that on "Something for the Thrill", the album takes a "left-turn", calling it a "veritable rock song, complete with thick, hairy guitars, heavy drumbeat and brash, pissed-off sounding vocals. But within the menace, there is that sweet melodic aspect cutting the hard edge, and the song is once again a testament to these singers' inspired pairing, with the duet being the through line of Creatures." "No Shape I Know" and "Small Things" are two of the most electronic songs on the record. Killbeat Music described them as "cautionary dystopian nightmares", saying they contain the album's "most wearily hopeful, soaring choruses."

== Release and promotion ==
A music video for "No Shape I Know" was uploaded onto YouTube on January 31, 2025, followed four days later by a live video for "Holly". "No Shape I Know" was issued as the lead single on February 13. A music video for "Holly", directed by Laura La France, was released on March 4. The song was issued as the second single from the album on March 20. Creatures was issued as a digital download on April 30 by Victory Pool. The band toured Canadian festivals throughout 2025. An outtake from Creatures, "In the Low Light", was released as a non-album single in July. The song was backed by two other outtakes from the album, "Ranchlands Hum" and "Honey Don't".

== Critical reception ==
Killbeat Music praised Nastasia's and St. John's vocals, saying that even though the album contains varying genres and styles throughout, their voices "tie everything together." They described the record as "lush" and "sprawling", and also commended the lyricism and musicianship, writing the album contains "powerfully poetic, often anthemic, narratives [that] soar over Greenwood and MacLeod's layered multi-instrumental wizardry." They summarized by saying that, in comparison to their self-titled debut, it was "anyone's guess where this group will go next. For fans of Nina Nastasia or the Florida BC band family, there's plenty of both of those things, but there's also a whole new, unified thing; with Creatures they're presenting it in widescreen."

== Track listing ==
All lyrics are written by Nina Nastasia and Clinton St. John; all music is composed by Nastasia, St. John, Jeff MacLeod and Morgan Greenwood

No.	Title	Length
1.	"Cheyenne"	3:19
2.	"Holly"	2:52
3.	"Murder Ballad"	5:11
4.	"Wharwolf"	4:27
5.	"Dalton"	3:08
6.	"Something for the Thrill"	3:04
7.	"No Shape I Know"	4:14
8.	"Small Things"	2:36
9.	"Old Collapser"	6:01
10.	"Saw the Wave"	4:38
Total length:		40:49

== Credits and personnel ==
Credits adapted from the album's SoundCloud and Bandcamp listings.

- Lyrics by Nina Nastasia and Clinton St. John
- Music and arrangements by Nina Nastasia, Clinton St. John, Jeff MacLeod and Morgan Greenwood
- Recorded and produced by Colin Stewart at The Hive Studio
- Mastered by Bob Weston at Chicago Mastering Service

Musicians

- Nina Nastasia – musical performance
- Clinton St. John – musical performance and album artwork
- Jeff MacLeod – musical performance
- Morgan Greenwood – musical performance
- Kathryn Calder – keys on "Cheyenne", "Murder Ballad" and "Small Things"
