= You Follow Me =

Studio album by Nina Nastasia and Jim White
- Released: 28 May 2007
- Recorded: 2006
- Studio: Electrical Audio
- Genre: Alternative rock
- Length: 31:18
- Label: FatCat
- Producer: Steve Albini

Nina Nastasia chronology
On Leaving (2006)	You Follow Me (2007)	Outlaster (2010)

Professional ratings
Review scores
Source	Rating
AllMusic	4/5 stars
Drowned in Sound	9/10 stars
Pitchfork Media	8.6/10
PopMatters	8/10 stars
Slant Magazine	4.5/5 stars
Spin	6/10 stars
Tiny Mix Tapes	3.5/5 stars

You Follow Me is a collaborative studio album between American singer-songwriter Nina Nastasia and Australian drummer Jim White. The album was released in Europe and Australia on 28 May 2007, and in the United States and Canada on 14 August 2007 (see 2007 in music) and was the second Nastasia album released by independent British label FatCat Records. This is Nastasia's fifth studio release overall.

Jim White is arguably known best as the drummer for Australian rock trio the Dirty Three, but he had long been closely associated with innumerable other alternative rock acts, often spending years at a time recording and/or touring extensively with the likes of Bonnie Prince Billy, Cat Power, Bill Callahan / Smog, PJ Harvey and Nick Cave, among others; yet this was the only album to bear his name as a leading artist until his collaborative albums with Mark Kozelek and Ben Boye.

A non-album single, "What She Doesn't Know", was released in both 7" vinyl and digital download formats on 25 February 2008, in support of the album.

== Recording and production ==
Despite being released the year after On Leaving, You Follow Me was in fact the first of these two albums to be recorded. Nastasia and White first discussed the possibility of recording a collaborative album while the pair were touring Russia with violinist Dylan Willemsa in support of Run to Ruin; the intention being to record an entire album where Nastasia's voice and acoustic guitar would be supported throughout solely by White's drumming.

Prior to work officially commencing with Steve Albini at Electrical Audio Studios, White and Nastasia, along with her longtime companion Kennan Gudjonsson, rented a rehearsal space where they quickly recorded multiple takes of each song. Gudjonsson and White would then both return to their home editing stations to subject each recorded track to an arduous process of selection and editing, in effect creating a rough demo of a song by piecing together individual sections of different takes. This process would need to be repeated several times, however, as Nastasia explained, "Jim would play around with different things. He's a very intuitive player, and he could interpret the song differently every time. He sometimes went by the dynamics in the guitar, other times he'd instigate the dynamic change. And he wanted it to be very precise, very specific. He didn't want to improvise." These demos were later used as guide tracks when recording started with Steve Albini.

"Our Discussion" was originally recorded with Boom Bip for his 2005 album Blue-Eyed in the Red Room, where it appeared under its original title of "The Matter (Of Our Discussion)." Nastasia commented that her original collaboration with Boom Bip "[...] ended up not really working as intended. He sent me some songs and was saying, "Why don't you write lyrics over them?" And even though it was beautiful music, I couldn't figure out what to do with any of it. And I didn't have time to figure it out. I already had "Our Discussion" finished so I just sent him that. He did his version of the instrumental — he remixed it — and I really liked it, but we had played it before [as a band] and Jim and I [wanted to] record it [for You Follow Me]."

Nastasia later expressed some dissatisfaction with the album, stating that "some of those songs I felt like I really wanted to hear how they would have sounded on record with a full band. I mean, I like how they turned out, but I've played some of those songs with a full band since [the record was released], and I just... I don't like to re-record a song. I just feel like I should write another one."

== Track listing ==
All songs written and composed by Nina Nastasia.

1. "I've Been Out Walking" – 3:18
2. "I Write Down Lists" – 3:15
3. "Odd, Said the Doe" – 3:12
4. "The Day I Would Bury You" – 2:55
5. "Our Discussion" – 3:05
6. "In the Evening" – 2:26
7. "There Is No Train" – 2:26
8. "Late Night" – 4:00
9. "How Will You Love Me" – 3:24
10. "I Come After You" – 3:17

== Release history ==
Region	Date	Label	Format	Catalog #
Europe / Australia	28 May 2007	FatCat Records	CD	FATCD53
Europe / Australia	28 May 2007	FatCat Records	Vinyl	FATLP53
US / Canada	14 August 2007	FatCat Records	CD	FATCD53
US / Canada	14 August 2007	FatCat Records	Vinyl	FATLP53

== Credits and personnel ==
- Nina Nastasia – vocals, guitar, record producer, editing and arrangements
- Jim White – drums, percussion, production, editing and arrangements
- Kennan Gudjonsson – production, editing, arrangements, mastering, package artwork and design
- Steve Albini – engineering
- Steve Rooke – mastering
- DLT – package artwork and design
- Jos A. Smith – cover image, "The Windblown Rider At the Lake of the Stars"
