= Dogs (Nina Nastasia album) =

Studio album by Nina Nastasia
- Released: 2000; June 8, 2004 (re-release)
- Recorded: October 1999
- Studio: Electrical Audio, Chicago
- Genre: Indie rock; folk
- Length: 43:53
- Label: Socialist; Touch and Go
- Producer: Steve Albini

Nina Nastasia chronology
Dogs (2000)	The Blackened Air (2002)

Alternative cover
- 2004 re-release cover art

Dogs is the debut studio album by American singer-songwriter Nina Nastasia. It was originally released in 2000 by the New York City-based independent label Socialist Records, and re-released in 2004 by Touch and Go Records. Engineered and produced by Steve Albini, the album gained notoriety after BBC radio disc jockey John Peel championed it, giving it frequent airplay on Radio 1.

Written over a six-year period, the album is lyrically reflective of Nastasia's early life growing up in Los Angeles, California, and features sparse acoustic guitar compositions with prominent string arrangements. The album garnered favorable critical reviews, and its 2004 re-release helped earn Nastasia a cult following.

== Composition ==
The majority of Dogs was written over a six-year period between 1992 and 1998 when Nastasia, a Los Angeles native, relocated to New York City with a friend. Prior, she had lived in Seattle, where she taught herself to play guitar. During writing the material that would come to be featured on Dogs, Nastasia was working as a waitress, a job that made her "so miserable" she "spent the rest of [her] waking hours writing songs."

"Most of what's historical on this record comes from my years in Los Angeles," she commented. "New York City has probably not had so much of an effect on what I write as it has on whether or not I write at all. I think that living somewhere else then might have been healthier for me."

== Recording ==
Nastasia recorded the album at Electrical Audio in Chicago under producer and engineer Steve Albini; Albini later described it as one of the albums he is the most proud of, as well as one of his personal favorites:

"In the process of making a record, you hear it so many times that the charms of even the best of them can wear off through over-exposure. On rare occasions, records I've worked on have withstood this scrutiny and ended up being personal favorites. Nina Nastasia's 'Dogs' is a record so simultaneously unassuming and grandiose that I can't really describe it, except in terms that would make it (and me) sound silly. Of the couple thousand records I've been involved with, this is one of my favourites, and one that I'm proud to be associated with."

Recalling her time in the studio with Albini, Nastasia said she was unaware of his career in the music industry:

Well, it's funny, I really don't know a lot about music, so I didn't really... I knew about him, but it wasn't like I had followed him or anything... [I] actually had friends that had recorded with him before, or had recorded in his studio and recommended it as a place to work, and recommended him. And then we listened to records that he had recorded and liked the sound of it. And we wanted to record everything live, so it made sense. And he's very, very accessible – y'know, we sent him a tape to see if he was interested in recording it, and he said, yes, I am! But I think he's interested in recording anybody! That's the great thing about that place – anybody can go and work with him. It's a very reasonable price too, for what you're getting.

== Release ==
Dogs was first released on the small independent label Socialist Records in 2000. It received a short run of compact disc pressings featuring hand-pasted photographs and hand-set type, which went out of print within the year. Through word of mouth, it continued to gain traction internationally, receiving considerable airplay in the United Kingdom— particularly on BBC Radio 1 by disc jockey John Peel who championed the album, calling it "astonishing." This resulted in a re-issue of the album on June 7, 2004, by Touch and Go Records.

== Critical reception ==
Professional ratings
Review scores
Source	Rating
AllMusic	4/5 stars
Pitchfork	7.4/10
Uncut	4/5 stars

Gregory McIntosh of AllMusic wrote: "Dogs has a calming atmosphere, occasionally flirting with dissonance, and stands as a remarkable work of minimal building by repetition to support Nastasia's pitch-perfect voice. It is a rare group who can pull off such a fluid shift from composed sophistication to raw, dangerous, and sinister energy and not only continue to be engaging, but make ascending demands so confidently as to require full attention for the span of 40 minutes without interruption."

Upon the album's original 2000 release, the Chicago Reader's Tim Midgett praised the album, writing in a review: "Nastasia's lyrics are artless in the best sense, and her singing is likewise uncontrived. Most of the structures are bedrock simple, though the delicate, minute-long apology "Dear Rose" and the roiling "Underground" in particular are distinctive despite their accessibility. Yet time and again, Nastasia's approach and the approach of her group transform her material into something more than merely charming."

Chris Dahlen of Pitchfork noted upon the album's 2004 reissue: "Dogs has the ease of a performance that you're catching as you sit in the shower stall. The songs here include some of the best she's written, but they're also some of the most unexpected. Without this reissue, we could have forgotten that she has an ear for big guitar riffs, or that she sounds beautiful just playing straight on an acoustic guitar. And who would have remembered that she has a sense of humor?" Helen Spitzer of the Canadian publication Exclaim! praised the album's instrumentation, writing: "The arrangements are simple and always immaculate, incorporating strings and saws and brushes, heavy with space. The singing saw is just another character in her stories, the whine of a ghostly dog following his own path, ambling through the record and leaving aching hearts in his wake."

== Track listing ==
All tracks are written by Nina Nastasia.

No.	Title	Length
1.	"Dear Rose"	1:32
2.	"Oblivion"	2:15
3.	"Judy's in the Sandbox"	3:15
4.	"Underground"	3:14
5.	"A Dog's Life"	2:46
6.	"A Love Song"	3:01
7.	"Stormy Weather"	2:59
8.	"Smiley"	2:56
9.	"Roadkill"	2:11
10.	"Nobody Knew Her"	4:25
11.	"Too Much in Between"	2:32
12.	"Jimmy Rose's Tattoo"	3:30
13.	"The Long Walk"	3:01
14.	"All Your Life"	3:45
15.	"4 yrs"	2:47
Total length:		43:53

== Personnel ==
Musicians

- Nina Nastasia – vocals, guitar
- Joshua Carlebach – accordion
- Stephen A.F. Day – cello
- Kennan Gudjonsson – piano
- Juliann Kloptic – violin
- Gerry Leonard – guitar
- Gonzalo Munoz – musical saw
- Dave Richards – bass
- Peter Yanowitz – drums

Technical and design

- Steve Albini – production, engineering
- Steve Rooke – mastering
- Matt Lindsey – photography

Adapted from liner notes
