= Strawberry Hotel =

Studio album by Underworld
- Released: 25 October 2024
- Length: 68:24
- Label: Smith Hyde; Virgin
- Producer: Esme Bronwen-Smith; Rick Smith

Underworld chronology
Drift Series 1 (2019)	Strawberry Hotel (2024)

Singles from Strawberry Hotel
- 1. "And the Colour Red" Released: 3 April 2023; 2. "Denver Luna" Released: 18 October 2023; 3. "Black Poppies" Released: 6 September 2024

Professional ratings
Aggregate scores
Source	Rating
AnyDecentMusic?	7.5/10
Metacritic	83/100
Review scores
Source	Rating
AllMusic	3.5/5 stars
The Arts Desk	4/5 stars
BPM	73%
Classic Pop	4.5/5 stars
Mojo	4/5 stars
MusicOMH	4.5/5 stars
The Observer	4/5 stars
Record Collector	4/5 stars
Sputnikmusic	3.7/5
Uncut	9/10

Strawberry Hotel is the eleventh studio album by British electronic group Underworld, released on 25 October 2024 through Virgin Music and the band's own label Smith Hyde Productions. It is the group's first studio album in five years, following the release of Drift Series 1 in 2019.

== Track listing ==
All tracks are written by Karl Hyde and Rick Smith.

Strawberry Hotel track listing
No.	Title	Length
1.	"Black Poppies"	2:52
2.	"Denver Luna"	8:01
3.	"Techno Shinkansen"	3:23
4.	"And the Colour Red"	5:42
5.	"Sweet Lands Experience"	4:44
6.	"Lewis in Pomona"	5:38
7.	"Hilo Sky"	5:04
8.	"Burst of Laughter"	3:27
9.	"King of Haarlem"	3:46
10.	"Ottavia"	5:00
11.	"Denver Luna" (acappella)	2:27
12.	"Gene Pool"	9:07
13.	"Oh Thorn!"	1:59
14.	"Iron Bones"	4:39
15.	"Stick Man Test"	2:35
Total length:		68:24

Japanese bonus track
No.	Title	Length
16.	"Velvet Does"	4:56
Total length:		73:20

== Personnel ==
Underworld

- Karl Hyde – vocals (all tracks), engineering (track 4)
- Rick Smith – keyboards, production, mixing, engineering (all tracks); synthesizer (tracks 1, 4–10, 12–14), drums (1, 5–10, 12–15); mastering (2, 4, 11); vocals, vocal programming (2, 11); programming (3, 4); guitar, synthesizer programming (15)

Additional contributors

- Esme Bronwen-Smith – production (tracks 1, 5–10, 12–15), vocals (5–7, 10)
- Miles Showell – mastering (tracks 1, 3–15)
- Nina Nastasia – vocals (track 14)

== Charts ==
Chart performance for Strawberry Hotel
Chart (2024)	Peak position
Belgian Albums (Ultratop Flanders)	142
Dutch Albums (Album Top 100)	63
Japanese Digital Albums (Oricon)	25
Japanese Hot Albums (Billboard Japan)	46
Scottish Albums (OCC)	16
Swiss Albums (Schweizer Hitparade)	73
UK Albums (OCC)	43
UK Dance Albums (OCC)	1
