= Won't You Take Me with You =

Studio album by Daniel Knox
- Released: January 15, 2021
- Length: 43:05
- Label: H. P. Johnson Presents
- Producer: Daniel Knox & Joshua Fitzgerald Klocek

Daniel Knox chronology
I Had a Wonderful Time (2019)	Won't You Take Me with You (2021)

Singles from Won't You Take Me with You
- 1. "Fool in the Heart" Released: October 27, 2020; 2. "Fall Apart" Released: November 24, 2020; 3. "Looks at Me" Released: January 6, 2021

Professional ratings
Aggregate scores
Source	Rating
AnyDecentMusic?	7.5/10
Metacritic	83/100
Review scores
Source	Rating
Beats Per Minute	82%
Clash	8/10
Loud and Quiet	9/10
MusicOMH	3.5/5 stars

Won't You Take Me with You is the fifth studio album by American singer-songwriter Daniel Knox. It was released on January 15, 2021, through Knox's own label H.P. Johnson Presents.

== Release ==
On October 27, 2020, Daniel Knox announced the release of his fifth studio album. In a press release, Knox stated: "Every song on Won't You Take Me With You has a trap door that leads to one or more other songs on the record. I wanted the songs to stand apart but still hold hands. It was important to me that these songs all know each other, but not necessarily live in the same time and place."

=== Singles ===
The first single, "Fool In the Heart", was released on October 27, 2020. Beats Per Minute described the single as playing like a "graceful caress, piano chords rising and falling in gentle waves while serene and angelic adornments flutter in the background like softly-falling snow. Knox's rich baritone matches the understated grandiosity of the instrumentation, but his story is by turns acerbic, pitying and hopeless."

On November 24, 2020, the second single from the album, "Fall Apart", was released.

The album's third single, "Look at Me", was released on January 6, 2021.

== Critical reception ==
Won't You Take Me with You was met with "universal acclaim" in reviews from critics. At Metacritic, which assigns a weighted average rating out of 100 to reviews from mainstream publications, the release received an average score of 83 based on 5 reviews. At AnyDecentMusic?, the album received a 7.5 out of 10 based on 7 reviews.

Writing for Beats Per Minute, Rob Hakimian said: "Such is the elegance and detail of Knox’s songwriting and voice – not to mention the exquisite instrumentation – that one can't help but get swept up in it and extrapolate from it. In that regard, Won't You Take Me With You is an unmitigated triumph from an artist who continues to dazzle and enthrall with each release." Adam Laver of Clash, wrote "The soft and meaningful piano has the emotive hooks that make the record so captivating. The latter half of the record is particularly reflective, and his piano playing is what really brings this sombre mood to the foreground." In a review for MusicOMH, Chris White stated: "It may have been written and recorded in double quick time, but Won’t You Take Me With You is still an impressively assured, fully realised record. It kicks off with the quintessentially Raindogs-era Waits barroom piano and squalling woodwind of "King Of The Ball", followed by the woozy (and very Lynchian) lounge-jazz of "Vinegar Hill", but switches mood thereafter, with most of the remaining songs occupying sombre ballad territory." Tom Critten for Loud and Quiet wrote: "Across this striking record, he proves he is beyond capable of producing excellence; his is a majestic body of work that demands repeat listening."

== Track listing ==
Won't You Take Me with You track listing
No.	Title	Writer(s)	Length
1.	"King of the Ball"	Daniel Knox	3:03
2.	"Vinegar Hill"	Daniel Knox	5:28
3.	"Fall Apart"	Daniel Knox	4:26
4.	"Fool in the Heart"	Daniel Knox	6:01
5.	"Girl From Carbondale"	Daniel Knox	4:51
6.	"Look at Me"	Daniel Knox	7:33
7.	"I Saw Someone Alone"	Daniel Knox	4:45
8.	"Lights Out"	Daniel Knox	1:48
9.	"No Horizon"	Daniel Knox	5:10
Total length:			43:05

== Personnel ==
- Daniel Knox – piano, synth, vocals
- Joshua Fitzgerald Klocek – guitar
- Paul Parts – electric bass
- Colby Starck – drums
- Jim Cooper – string bass/orchestration
- Andra Kulans – violin and viola
- Nora Barton – cello
- Nate Lepine – saxophone
- Nick Jones – timpani

=== Technical ===
- Greg Norman – engineering, mixing
- Greg Obis – mastering
- John Atwood – photography
- Sheila Sachs – design
