= Nina Nastasia =

American folk singer-songwriter (born 1966)

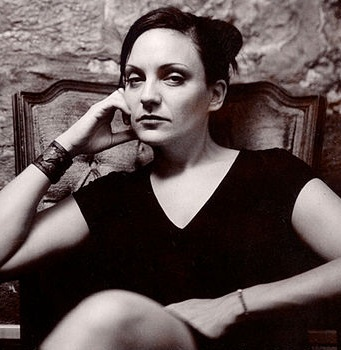

Background information
- Born: May 13, 1966 (age 60); Los Angeles, California, U.S.
- Genres: Folk; chamber folk
- Instruments: Vocals; guitar; piano
- Years active: 1999–present
- Labels: Socialist; Touch and Go; Fat Cat; Temporary Residence Limited
- Member of: Jolie Laide
- Website: ninanastasiaofficial.com

Nina Maria Nastasia (/nəˈstɑːziə/ nuh-stAH-ssee-uh; born May 13, 1966) is an American folk singer-songwriter. A native of Los Angeles, she first came to prominence in New York City in 2000 after Radio 1 disc jockey John Peel began giving her debut album, Dogs, airplay. The album earned Nastasia a cult following, and was re-released in 2004. Subsequent albums include The Blackened Air (2002), Run to Ruin (2004), On Leaving (2006), and You Follow Me (2007). The latter is a collaboration with Australian drummer Jim White of Dirty Three.

Following the release of her 2010 album Outlaster, Nastasia took an extended hiatus from recording. She returned in 2022 with her seventh album, Riderless Horse. All of her albums were recorded by Steve Albini. Following his death in 2024, Nastasia self-produced her eighth album, Songs for a World of Trouble, which was released in 2025. Her musical style has been described as folk and country-influenced with neo-Gothic overtones, often featuring sparse acoustic guitar accompanied by string arrangements.

In addition to her solo work, Nastasia has collaborated with other musicians. She formed the band Jolie Laide in 2020 alongside Jeff MacLeod, Clinton St. John and Morgan Greenwood of The Cape May and Florida BC. The band released two albums: Jolie Laide in 2023 and Creatures in 2025. She has also collaborated with musicians such as Daniel Knox, Marissa Paternoster, and Underworld.

== Early life ==
Nina Nastasia was born and raised Los Angeles, California. She is of Calabrian-Italian and Irish descent. Her father, Jim Nastasia, was an artist and art teacher at Fairfax High School and Cerritos College. Nastasia has said that her mother, who experienced chronic illness, was "constantly on the verge of dying, my entire life," and that her medication sometimes resulted in her suffering psychotic episodes. Her mother died when she was eighteen years old.

As a child, Nastasia studied piano and often wrote short stories, but has said she had no aspirations of becoming a professional musician.

== Career ==
Nastasia began writing songs in 1993, and released her first album, Dogs, in 2000. Only 1,500 copies of the album were initially pressed, with Nastasia putting together the album packaging herself in her apartment. Nastasia sold them at her shows, quickly selling all of them. By the end of the year 2000, the album was out of print. Famed DJ John Peel took notice of the album (calling it "astonishing") after having been given a copy by Steve Albini. Peel began playing songs from it frequently on his radio show on BBC Radio 1. The album helped earn Nastasia a cult following.

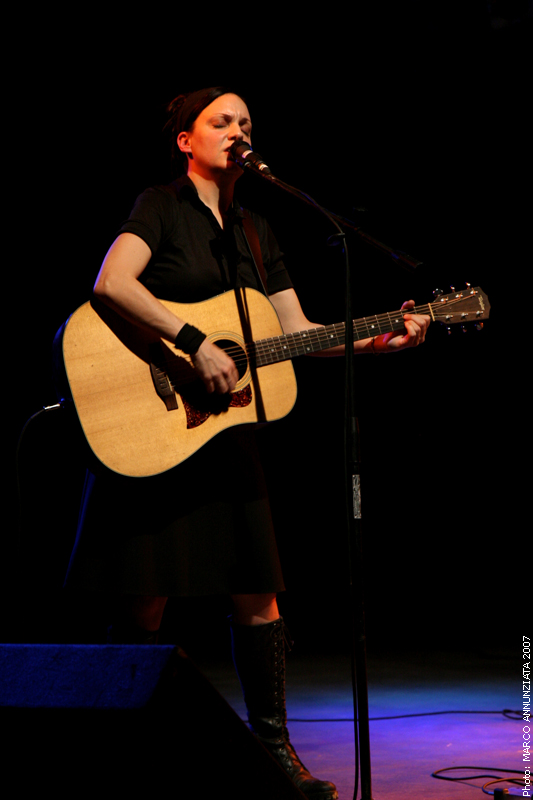
Nastasia performing in Italy, 2007

Nastasia has released seven albums, one in collaboration with Jim White. Her first album, Dogs, was initially released in 2000 on Socialist Records. Her subsequent albums, The Blackened Air (2002) and Run to Ruin (2003), were released on indie label Touch and Go Records, which also re-released Dogs in 2004, followed by a national tour; in CMJ, music journalist Kara Zuaro reviewed a live show promoting Run to Ruin, noting: "Nastasia hearkens back to a time when chamber music was a performed as a pastime for the players, rather than a spectator sport for the blue -blooded. When an audience applauds her live performances, she and her congenial New York City-based orchestra, minus the singing saw player who left to join the circus, turn to smile at each other."

In 2006, On Leaving was released on Fat Cat Records. In 2007, an album on which she collaborated with Jim White entitled You Follow Me was released through Fat Cat. All of Nastasia's albums to date were recorded by Steve Albini, who has ardently praised her music in a number of interviews. Nastasia subsequently recorded six sessions for late BBC disc jockey John Peel's show. The last one was recorded with the help of Tuvan throat singing group Huun-Huur-Tu. Two of Nastasia's songs were included in Peel's annual Festive Fifty: "Ugly Face" (ranked 4th in 2002) and "You, Her & Me" (ranked 13th in 2003).

"Stormy Weather"
Album version, as it appeared on Dogs

A 7-inch single, titled "What She Doesn't Know" was released on February 25, 2008. The single featured the title track, along with the song "Your Red Nose". Both tracks were recorded by Steve Albini during the On Leaving sessions. Nastasia has called the single "a good complement to You Follow Me". A solo American and European tour coincided with the release of the single. The single "Cry, Cry, Baby" was released on May 10, 2010, internationally and May 18 in the US. Her sixth studio album, Outlaster, followed on June 7, 2010.

Nastasia disappeared from the public eye for several years. On September 24, 2017, she performed at the Electrical Audio 20th anniversary party at The Hideout Block Party in Chicago, Illinois. On December 14, 2018, she released the non-album single "Handmade Card". In October 2020, Nastasia issued a statement for her fans on Bandcamp which read: "I've been away for a long while now, but I just finished recording a new album with Steve Albini. I'm going to be working hard over the next few months to get those songs out to you and many more in the near future."

In February 2022, Nastasia signed a record deal with Temporary Residence Limited, which digitally reissued On Leaving, You Follow Me and Outlaster that same month. She appeared as the opening act for Mogwai on their US theater tour in April. Her seventh studio album, Riderless Horse, recorded by Steve Albini and Greg Norman in a cabin in upstate New York, was released on July 22, 2022. Nastasia collaborated with musician Jeff MacLeod of The Cape May and Florida B.C. to record her next studio album, Jolie Laide. The record was released on November 17, 2023 under the name Jolie Laide. A music video for the song "Pacific Coast Highway" was released on August 18. Jolie Laide's second album, Creatures, was released on April 30, 2025.

Nastasia's eighth studio album, Songs for a World of Trouble, was self-produced and released on June 13, 2025. The eight song record was released digitally, exclusively on Bandcamp, coupled with a 60-page eBook of artwork, pictures, poems, biographical stories, liner notes, and credits. The album will not be released physically or on any other digital platform. The album was preceded by the release of three music videos: "No Communication", "North Dakota", and "Happiness".

== Musical style ==
Nastasia's music has been noted by journalists and critics for blending elements of folk and Americana, with Gothic overtones. Her music has been likened to that of Tom Waits, Devendra Banhart, Neko Case, and Cat Power. Her songs prominently feature acoustic guitar, often with various string arrangements accompanying, including cello, violin, and viola.

=== Influences ===
Nastasia has stated in interviews that she knows little of musical history, and had not originally intended to become a musician. She has commented that she is a fan of films, particularly horror films.

== Discography ==
=== Albums ===
- Dogs (2000; re-released 2004)
- The Blackened Air (2002)
- Run to Ruin (2003)
- On Leaving (2006)
- You Follow Me (2007) – with Jim White
- Outlaster (2010)
- Riderless Horse (2022)
- Jolie Laide (2023) – with Jolie Laide
- Creatures (2025) – with Jolie Laide
- Songs for a World of Trouble (2025)
- Seaside Recordings (2026)

=== Singles and EPs ===
- "What She Doesn't Know" (2008)
- "Cry, Cry, Baby" (2010)
- "You Can Take Your Time" (2010)
- "Handmade Card" (2018)
- "Just Stay in Bed" (2022)
- "This Is Love" (2022)
- "Afterwards" (2022)
- "Too Soon" / "Whatever You Need to Believe" (2022)
- "This Is Love" / "You Were So Mad" (with Marissa Paternoster) (2023)
- "I Will Never Marry" (2026)
- "Family Name" (2026)
- "Everytime" (2026)
- "Birthday" (2026)
- "The Sandman" (2026)
- One Turned In" (2026)
- "Simpuru Ni" (2026)
- "Liar" (2026)

=== Contributions ===
- 2001 "I Will Never Marry", on the compilation album Comes with a Smile, Volume 3 – Pretty Together
- 2005 "The Matter (of Our Discussion)", on the Boom Bip album Blue Eyed in the Red Room (Lex)
- 2005 "Bird of Cuzco", song on John Peel: A Tribute compilation (WEA)
- 2009 "Repulsion", on the compilation album Black and White, given free with issue No. 12 of Esopus
- 2010 "Outside the Haus Tambaran", "Sand Reflection" and "Final Call" from the David Corter album Didgeridoo Dimensions
- 2018 "The Poisoner" on the Daniel Knox album Chasescene
- 2024 "I Hope It's Different" on the Mint Mile album Roughrider
- 2024 "Iron Bones" on the Underworld album Strawberry Hotel

== Band members ==
- Nina Nastasia, vocals and guitars
- Steven Beck, piano (Run to Ruin, On Leaving)
- Jay Bellerose, drums (The Blackened Air, On Leaving, Outlaster)
- Paul Bryan, bass, orchestral arrangements (Outlaster)
- Joshua Carlebach, accordion (Dogs, The Blackened Air, Run to Ruin)
- Oto Carillo, French horn (Outlaster)
- Stephen Day, cello (Dogs, The Blackened Air, Run to Ruin, Outlaster)
- Kennan Gudjonsson, piano (Dogs)
- Anne Mette Iversen, double bass (Run to Ruin)
- Juliann Klopotic, violin (Dogs)
- Rubin Kodheli, cello (On Leaving)
- Gerry Leonard, guitar, mandolin (Dogs, The Blackened Air, Run to Ruin)
- June Matayoshi, oboe, English horn (Outlaster)
- Gonzalo Muñoz, saw (Dogs, The Blackened Air)
- Jeff Parker, guitar (Outlaster)
- Dave Richards, bass (Dogs, The Blackened Air, Run to Ruin)
- Jason Stein, bass clarinet (Outlaster)
- Matt Szemela, violin (Outlaster)
- Amie Weiss, violin (Outlaster)
- Jim White, drums (Run to Ruin, On Leaving, You Follow Me)
- Dylan Willemsa, viola, violin (The Blackened Air, Run to Ruin, On Leaving)
- Peter Yanowitz, drums (Dogs)
- Lev 'Ljova' Zhurbin, viola (Outlaster)
