= Daniel Knox =

American singer-songwriter and composer (born 1980)

- Born: September 22, 1980 (age 44); Springfield, Illinois, U.S.
- Instrument(s): Vocals, piano
- Years active: 2007-present
- Labels: Carrot Top, H.P. Johnson Presents
- Website: danielknox.com

Daniel Knox (born September 22, 1980) is an American singer-songwriter and composer. Based in Chicago, Illinois, Knox rose to prominence through his collaborations with David Lynch, Jarvis Cocker, the Handsome Family, Rufus Wainwright and Nina Nastasia.

== Biography ==
Daniel Knox was born and raised in Springfield, Illinois. Knox had an early interest in cinema and enrolled in the film program at Columbia College Chicago, only to drop out after a year, citing his disillusionment with the collaborative process. He then began to teach himself piano by playing in public spaces at night, mostly in hotel lobbies. Knox did not sing until he was in his early twenties.

Knox worked many odd jobs and eventually became a projectionist at Chicago's Music Box Theatre. It was through the Music Box that Knox was selected by director David Lynch, who was touring with his film Inland Empire, to perform a piece of music alongside Lynch’s screening in 2007. Knox played an original piece on the theater’s organ as an overture while Lynch read a poem.

In 2007, Knox was invited by art director David Coulter to perform at the Barbican Center alongside musicians including Rufus Wainwright, the Handsome Family and Damon Albarn. In 2012, Knox was an artist-in-residence at the Watermill Center in New York alongside photographer John Atwood.

Knox’s 2018 album, Chasescene, includes a number of notable collaborations. Jarvis Cocker sings the lead vocals on "Capitol", Nina Nastasia sings "The Poisoner" and Brett Sparks of the Handsome Family sings back-up vocals on "David Charmichael". Knox has cited Nastasia as one of his favorite living songwriters.

Knox has written scores for films as well as theater. The portrait on the cover of Knox's 2015 self-titled album was painted by artist Gregory Jacobsen.

== Musical style ==
Knox is noted for his baritone vocals and has described his own voice as having a heavy vibrato. His lyrics are described as dark and witty, and he has been compared to Randy Newman in his “refreshingly mean-spirited” songs. Knox has also been compared to Harry Nilsson, Scott Walker and Tom Waits. His musical style is eclectic, with descriptions ranging from jazz to cabaret to operatic pop, and he is also noted for a cinematic style in his songs. His musical delivery has been described as the "Midwestern sensibility of edginess meets kindness." In reference to his songwriting, Knox has been labelled a "master storyteller".

=== Influences ===
Knox has cited Judy Garland, Al Jolson and Maurice Chevalier as early musical influences. For his 2019 mini-album, I Had a Wonderful Time, Knox absorbed himself in Star Trek audiobooks and the music of Madonna.

== Discography ==
=== Albums ===
- Disaster (2007)
- Evryman for Himself (2011)
- Daniel Knox (2015)
- Chasescene (2018)
- I Had a Wonderful Time (2019)
- Won't You Take Me with You (2021)

=== Soundtrack ===
- Half-Heart: Songs from Twin Peaks (2020)
- You Are My Friend: The Songs of Mister Rogers (2020)

=== Singles ===
- "Last Christmas" (2018)
- "Die Hard" / "Die Harder" (2019)
- "Hollow" (2019)
