= The Cape May =

Canadian musical act

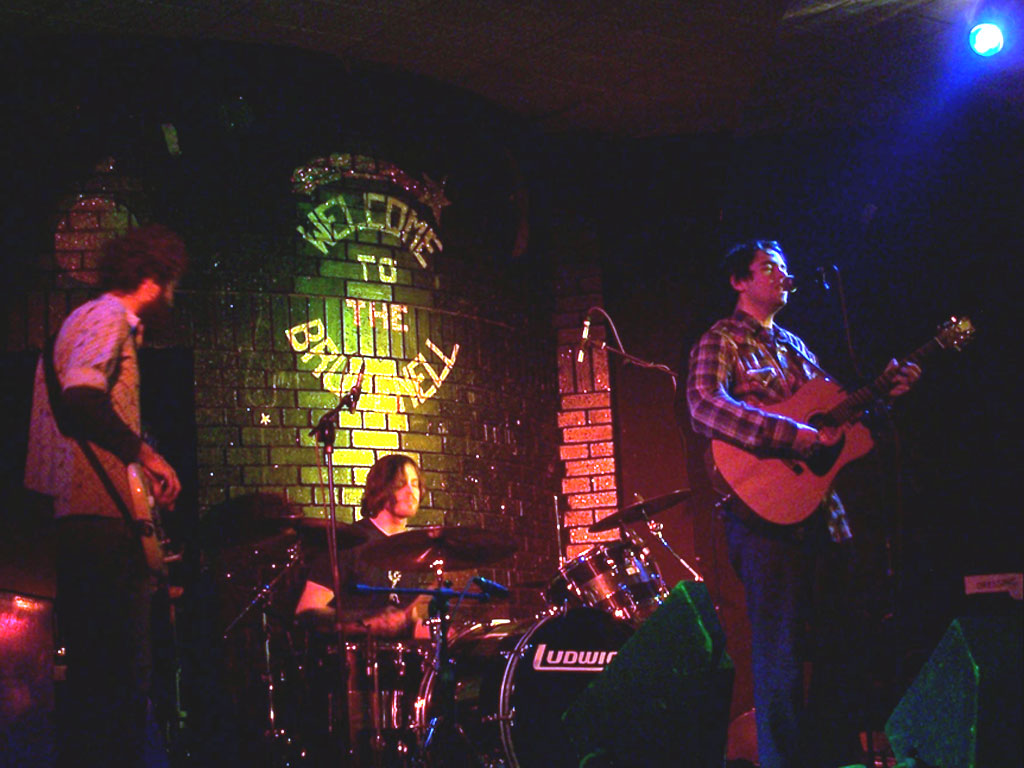
- The Cape May, November 2006

Background information
- Origin: Calgary, Alberta, Canada
- Genres: Indie rock
- Years active: 2003-2007
- Labels: Flemish Eye
- Members: Clinton St. John; Jeff MacLeod; Matt Flegel

The Cape May was a Canadian musical act from Calgary, Alberta. The band's songs are centred on the poetic lyrics of vocalist Clinton St. John, which tell moody stories of urban dystopia and a culture on the brink.

== History ==
The Cape May was formed in 2003 by Clinton St. John (vocals, guitars) and Jeff MacLeod (drums, guitars, keys, backing vocals). The band released their first album Central City May Rise Again on Flemish Eye in 2005; Jeff Deringer also contributed guitar to the album. The band embarked on a North American tour to support Central City May Rise Again after their record reached number 1 on the Canadian College music charts.

The band's lineup was later rounded out by multi-instrumentalist Matt Flegel. In 2006, they were invited by Nina Nastasia to be her backing band on tour across the US and Europe, opening on many of the dates. That year they released their second album, Glass Mountain Roads, with the help of engineer Steve Albini.

St John began to release his own music in 2007 and released his last album in 2014. Clinton St. John and Jeff Macleod reunited in 2020 to form the band Florida BC and released their debut album Salt Breaker Sand with the help from local musicians Morgan Greenwood (of Azeda Booth and Baths) and Carl Davison (Hook and Eye). Matt Flegel went on to form the band Women and then Viet Cong; the name proved to be too controversial and is now called Preoccupations.

Jeff MacLeod collaborated with Nina Nastasia to form Jolie Laide, who released their self-titled album in 2023. The band released their second album Creatures in 2025, which also features Florida BC members Clinton St. John and Morgan Greenwood.

== Discography ==
- Central City May Rise Again (January 2005)
- Glass Mountain Roads (September 2006)

== See also ==
- Music of Canada
- Canadian rock
- List of bands from Canada
- List of Canadian musicians
- Category:Canadian musical groups
