= Outlaster =

Studio album by Nina Nastasia
- Released: June 7, 2010
- Recorded: March 9–12, 2009
- Studio: Electrical Audio (Chicago)
- Genres: Folk; post-classical
- Length: 39:37
- Label: FatCat Records
- Producer: Kennan Gudjonsson (Note: No producer is listed in the album's liner notes. Instead Kennan Gudjonsson is listed as the "musical director". The album's arranger and conductor later confirmed Gudjonsson as Outlaster's "de facto" producer.)

Nina Nastasia chronology
You Follow Me (2007)	Outlaster (2010)	Riderless Horse (2022)

Singles from Outlaster
- 1. "Cry, Cry, Baby" Released: May 10, 2010; 2. "You Can Take Your Time" Released: December 6, 2010

Outlaster is the sixth studio album by American singer-songwriter Nina Nastasia. It was released by FatCat Records internationally on June 7, 2010, and in the United States on June 22. The album was recorded in four days at Steve Albini's Electrical Audio studio in Chicago. Los Angeles–based arranger Paul Bryan conducted score for a small orchestra, with Nastasia and her manager Kennan Gudjonsson assembling string and woodwind quartets. The record also features contributions from drummer Jay Bellerose and guitarist Jeff Parker.

Although no producer is listed in the liner notes, Gudjonsson is described as the musical director, with Bryan later confirming Gudjonsson as the producer. Gudjonsson also created the artwork alongside Dave Thomas. The album received generally positive reviews upon release, with multiple publications praising Nastasia's vocals and songwriting, as well as the quality of the orchestration and production.

"Cry, Cry, Baby" was released on May 10 as the first single from the album, followed by "You Can Take Your Time" on December 6. Each single contained an exclusive b-side: "Our Gang" and "One Turned In", respectively. Nastasia toured throughout Europe and performed sessions for several radio stations and websites in support of the record.

== Background and recording ==
Recording sessions for the album took place over the course of four days at Steve Albini's Electrical Audio in Chicago, from March 9 to March 12, 2009. Nastasia said the relatively short amount of time spent in the studio was the result of "using a bigger band, flying more people over, and such. The costs were higher, so we needed to get more done in a shorter time." Although no record producer was listed in the album credits, Nastasia's manager Kennan Gudjonsson was listed as the "musical director". Paul Bryan, who arranged and conducted the orchestral and woodwind instrumentation, confirmed Gudjonsson as the "de facto" producer of the record.

Nastasia composed every song on the album, and said Bryan and Gudjonsson collaborated to create the orchestration, with Bryan arranging the string and woodwind instrumentation and Gudjonsson hiring the musicians. The band and string section would rehearse for several hours prior to recording. Nastasia said several of the backing tracks, in particular "This Familiar Way", had "big holes in it for improvising." In his recording diary, Bryan said the band and orchestral quartet completed the backing tracks in the first three days. He elaborated that "things got off to an alarmingly slow start, but we eventually fell into a groove; I would rehearse the strings while Nina, [drummer] Jay Bellerose and [guitarist] Jeff Parker would fool around with ideas. Once I felt we were ready to track, I would grab a bass and hope that we could pull off something usable while the tape was still rolling." Bryan's piano and the woodwind quartet were overdubbed on the fourth day, with Albini completing the mixing of the record that same night.

Lyrically, fatality and immortality are major themes running throughout the album. Nastasia said she took an interest in the work of Aubrey de Grey, a gerontologist who has "talked a lot about viewing aging as a disease, which is an interesting way to look at it. It's a little controversial as an idea, but having this idea of trying to work towards curing aging, or trying to reverse it—then what does that mean, what would it mean to society if we didn't age any more? Or if we could reverse it? Or if we could live for over 1000 years?" She elaborated that the title track specifically "deals with the discomfort of the idea of living for a long time, especially if your loved ones didn't go along with you."

Several songs on Outlaster were performed live prior to their inclusion on the album. "Cry, Cry, Baby" was performed in December 2002 on John Peel's BBC Radio 1 show, under the title "Cry Baby". Similarly, "You Can Take Your Time" was performed during Nastasia's June 2004 Peel Session with Tuvan throat singing group Huun-Huur-Tu. The Outlaster version of the latter song was first released almost a year prior to the album, when it appeared on the August 2009 edition of FatCat Records's annual sampler.

== Artwork ==
The album artwork was created by Dave Thomas, under the pseudonym "DLT", and Kennan Gudjonsson. The two collaborated on the artwork for Nastasia's previous two albums—2006's On Leaving and 2007's You Follow Me—with Thomas saying Gudjonsson "loved packaging, he loved the artwork side of things." Gudjonsson created the illustration, with the two going "back and forth about the typography" and Gudjonsson hand rendering the final image. Thomas remarked that because of Gudjonsson's "attention to detail, a lot of people said he was quite difficult to work with, but I love going into that level of detail as well, so it was a real joy to work with him. There was always that thing of like, I've not thought of going quite that detailed on it. Like, the [CD booklets] for all of Nina's releases have little round corners on them because Kennan loved round corners. It's something that you would never see if you didn't buy the CD version to those records."

== Release and promotion ==
Album track "You're a Holy Man" was offered as a free download by Clash on March 31, 2010. A music video for "Cry, Cry, Baby" was released on April 13. The film was directed by Theo Stanley, and consisted of an unedited panoramic shot of the song being performed live in Nastasia's Chelsea, Manhattan apartment. On May 4, album track "What's Out There" premiered on Stereogum, which described the track as "dramatic" and "ambitious", saying "the piece is gleefully exploding at the seems." Clash launched a competition that same day, where the winner received a vinyl copy of the album, as well as a tote bag and a screen print of the album artwork. A limited run of these items were also sold at Nastasia's official web store.

"Cry, Cry, Baby" was issued as the first single from Outlaster on May 10, as a download-only release, and contained an exclusive b-side, the intimate demo recording "Our Gang". Nastasia began a ten-date tour of the United Kingdom on May 22. While performing in Manchester on May 25, Nastasia and touring violinist Matt Szemela recorded an acoustic session for Marc Riley's program on BBC Radio 6 Music, conducting a brief interview and performing three tracks from the album: "Wakes", "Outlaster" and "This Familiar Way". The version of the album sold at iTunes contained an exclusive pre-order bonus track titled "I'monamotherfuckingboat".

On September 28, an acoustic session recorded by Nastasia and Szemela was published on RockFeedBack, which featured an interview and four live tracks: "Outlaster", "Cry, Cry, Baby", "What's Out There" and "I Go with Him". Nastasia began the second leg of the tour supporting the album three days later. Beginning in Lisbon on October 1, and continuing throughout Europe, the tour was scheduled to travel through the United Kingdom and Ireland from November 29 to December 10, with Sons of Noel and Adrian set to appear as the opening act. However, the final twelve dates of the tour – the United Kingdom and Ireland dates – were canceled, citing unspecified "health concerns." "You Can Take Your Time" was released as the second single from the album on December 6, and was backed by another exclusive b-side: "One Turned In".

== Critical reception ==
Professional ratings
Aggregate scores
Source	Rating
AnyDecentMusic?	7.0/10
Review scores
Source	Rating
AllMusic	4/5 stars
BBC Music	Positive
Drowned in Sound	8/10
MusicOMH	4/5 stars
The New York Times	Positive
NME	4/5 stars
Paste	6.9/10
Pitchfork	8.1/10
The Skinny	2/5 stars
Tiny Mix Tapes	3.5/5 marks

Outlaster received generally positive reviews from music critics. At AnyDecentMusic?, which assigns a normalized rating out of 10 to reviews from mainstream critics, the album received an average score of 7.0 out of 10. It received an average score of 74 out of 100 at Album of the Year, based on 10 reviews.

Several publications praised the quality of the orchestration, including NME, which said Outlaster featured the richest and most grandiose instrumentation of her career, and described it as one of her most accomplished works to date. Similarly, musicOMH said the orchestration was distinctive when compared with the rest of Nastasia's primarily sparse discography, and that the record was "impressive in artistry and accomplishment." Pitchfork said the album sounded like a collaboration between a multitude of musicians "listening closely and reacting to one another", and said this collaboration prompted Nastasia to sing in a more passionate way than she had on previous records. Cokemachineglow said Outlaster excised simple "quiet–loud–quiet constructions" in favor of instrumentation that swells and contracts "around the space between notes." Their writer went on to summarize that the album is "something so far beyond its parts ... beyond anyone else working within this genre." The List described Outlaster as a beautiful record and "more often than not shiver-inducing".

Other writers commended the quality of Nastasia's vocals and songwriting, including The Line of Best Fit, and Treblezine, which dubbed it the album of the week. Although AllMusic also praised Bryan's arrangements and the orchestration, Nastasia's vocals were highlighted. Their writer said her vocals consistently rose above the arrangements "like a storm ... the effect is riveting." Blurt said Nastasia incorporated "extraordinary variety and drama into her [vocal] delivery. Now trilling, now whispering, now belting, she has a strong sense for when to use excess and when to cut back to nothing." The North Coast Journal said her vocals and delivery had more of an impact on the songs than the orchestration, and compared Nastasia's lyricism to that of Leonard Cohen. BBC Music said Nastasia's "beautiful voice is at the heart of this, being easy to love and full of natural soul, but also handling every syllable with a quick-smart economy that teems with strength and authority." Their writer also praised Nastasia's songwriting, saying: "Let her stories into your life, and they will never leave you. After all, Nastasia's talent is to snare those who find her, and never let them go."

Ben Ratliff of The New York Times praised the production, calling the album "ultra-suspenseful", elaborating: "The point of a Nina Nastasia record ... is that there's something threatening right over your shoulder: a sudden dynamic shift, a wail out of a whisper, drumming that trickles into a violent clatter. Her signature sound, beyond her clear, unaffected voice, is the worry in the air around the notes." Similarly, BBC Music commented that the production evoked a sense of "imminent danger". Drowned in Sound said it was her most elaborately produced album to date, to the extent that it suggested Nastasia may have "reached an expressive and creative peak." Their writer went on to praise her songwriting before commenting: "I suspect however that Nastasia's talent will continue to outlast that of her peers for a little while longer yet."

In a more mixed review, Paste said Outlaster contained too much musical variety, and claimed the album felt bipolar as a result. Their writer made several other references to mental illness when elaborating on the album's lyrical content, saying that despite containing several beautiful songs, the record "stretches too far in either direction; trying to encompass both naïve optimism and full-on straightjacket crazy. Maybe Nastasia's gotten tired of her nuanced tales, or maybe this album is an even more post-modern take on the real effects of mental imbalance over time—ambivalence and exhaustion." They called "What's Out There" a "downright terrifying" song. Tiny Mix Tapes said Nastasia's work often explores the "darker shades of discontent", and hypothesized that Outlaster's lyrical content was an extended metaphor that could relate to the "perils of 'outings' undertaken by the emotionally fragile". They described it as a courageous record, one that "underlines the point that human beings can persevere long enough to 'outlast' most crises", and called it a "complex and rewarding album, despite its flaws."

== Track listing ==
All songs written and composed by Nina Nastasia.

No.	Title	Length
1.	"Cry, Cry, Baby"	3:43
2.	"Moves Away"	1:50
3.	"You're a Holy Man"	3:33
4.	"You Can Take Your Time"	4:49
5.	"This Familiar Way"	5:03
6.	"What's Out There"	3:59
7.	"A Kind of Courage"	4:08
8.	"Wakes"	4:23
9.	"One Way Out"	2:55
10.	"Outlaster"	5:20
Total length:		39:37

Outlaster – iTunes pre-order bonus track
No.	Title	Length
11.	"I'monamotherfuckingboat"	1:51
Total length:		42:34

== Credits and personnel ==
Credits adapted from the liner notes of Outlaster.

- Recorded at Electrical Audio in Chicago by Steve Albini
- Mastered by John and JJ Golden at Golden Mastering in Ventura, California

Musicians

- Nina Nastasia – all vocals and acoustic guitar
- Jay Bellerose – drums
- Paul Bryan – electric bass and piano
- Oto Carrillo – French horn
- Stephen Day – cello
- James Falzone – clarinet
- June Matayoshi – oboe and English horn
- Jeff Parker – electric guitar
- Jason Stein – bass clarinet
- Matthew Szemela – 1st violin
- Amie Weiss – 2nd violin
- Lev "Ljova" Zhurbin – viola

Technical personnel

- Steve Albini – recording and mixing
- Paul Bryan – orchestral and woodwind arrangements and conducting
- Kennan Gudjonsson – album artwork and musical director
- Dave Thomas (as "DLT") – album artwork
- Dylan Willemsa – arrangement on "What's Out There" (with Paul Bryan)

== Release history ==
Region	Date	Format	Label	Catalog #	Ref.
United Kingdom	June 7, 2010	CD · LP · DL	FatCat Records	FATCD82	
United States	June 22, 2010	CD · LP · DL	FatCat Records	FATCD82	
