= The Blackened Air =

Studio album by Nina Nastasia
- Released: April 9, 2002
- Recorded: 2001
- Genre: Alternative rock, folk, chamber music
- Length: 43:45
- Label: Touch and Go Records
- Producer: Steve Albini

Nina Nastasia chronology
Dogs (2000)	The Blackened Air (2002)	Run to Ruin (2003)

Professional ratings
Review scores
Source	Rating
AllMusic	4.5/5 stars
CMJ New Music Report	(favorable)
Entertainment Weekly	A−
The Guardian	3/5 stars
Pitchfork	7.8/10
The Village Voice	(choice cut)

The Blackened Air is the second album by American singer-songwriter Nina Nastasia. It was released in 2002 by Touch and Go Records. The album was recorded almost completely live, with the band set up in a semi-circle in one corner of the studio, over a six-day period in 2001 at Steve Albini's Electrical Audio Studios in Chicago. The final track, "That's All There Is", was held over from sessions for her debut, Dogs.

The album's cover was painted by Nastasia's father Jim, and was inspired by the album track "Ocean".

== Track listing ==
All songs written by Nina Nastasia.

1. "Run, All You…" – 1:39
2. "I Go with Him" – 1:54
3. "This Is What It Is" – 4:17
4. "Oh, My Stars" – 3:08
5. "All for You" – 1:27
6. "So Little" – 3:27
7. "Desert Fly" – 2:03
8. "Ugly Face" – 4:10
9. "In the Graveyard" – 3:12
10. "Ocean" – 5:59
11. "Rosemary" – 1:49
12. "The Same Day" – 2:15
13. "Been So Long" – 1:29
14. "The Very Next Day" – 0:33
15. "Little Angel" – 1:57
16. "That's All There Is" – 4:26

== Credits and personnel ==
Musicians

- Nina Nastasia – guitar, vocals
- Jay Bellerose – drums
- Joshua Carlebach – accordion
- Stephen Day – cello
- Gerry Leonard – guitar, mandolin
- Gonzalo Munoz – saw
- Dave Richards – bass
- Dylan Willemsa – violin
- Peter Yanowitz – drums on "That's All There Is"

Production

- Steve Albini – engineering
- Kennan Gudjonsson – artwork, mastering, package design
- Steve Rooke – mastering
