= Azeda Booth =

Canadian experimental-pop band

- Genres: Pop, Glitch, IDM, experimental
- Years active: 2004–2011
- Labels: Absolutely Kosher; Lakesong Press
- Members: Jordon Hossack; Morgan Greenwood; Marc Rimmer; Myke Atkinson; Mike Wallace; Chris Reimer (d. 2012)

Azeda Booth was a Canadian experimental-pop band formed in Calgary in 2004, influenced by glitch, IDM, and experimental music. Self-described as "Cherry-Pop", Azeda Booth's music pulled from many genres.

== History ==
Founding members Morgan Greenwood and Jordon Hossack started Azeda Booth in 2004, after meeting on their last day of high school; the next day, they traded demo tapes and decided to start a band. During the summer of 2006, Myke Atkinson, Chris Reimer, Marc Rimmer and Mike Wallace joined the band. While band members each had their own musical strengths, they interchanged roles and instruments both in the studio and for live performances. Distinct characteristics of their music included Hossack's childlike falsetto vocals, and Greenwood's glitchy IDM drum programming.

Their first release Mysterious Body> was recorded in 2006 by Greenwood and Hossack and released independently in 2007. Shortly afterward, they released their second EP, Pink and Lime.

The band's debut full-length album, In Flesh Tones, was released on July 22, 2008, on Absolutely Kosher. It received critical acclaim, including a Pitchfork review stating the album was "one of 2008's most unique and immediately pleasurable albums", as well as "at a time when many popular bands' touchstones can be divided without remainders into Blogger tags, there simply isn't anyone doing exactly what these guys are doing right now." The album also made some "Best of 2008" lists.

At the end of summer 2008, Chris Reimer and Mike Wallace left the band due to commitments with the indie-rock group, Women. The remaining members released, and toured North America for, Tubtrek, an 8-song EP which was released as a free digital download.

In Spring 2010, Marc Rimmer left the band, returning Azeda Booth to its original 2-piece configuration consisting of Jordon Hossack and Morgan Greenwood. Morgan Greenwood moved to Vancouver in summer 2011, putting the band on indefinite hiatus. He went on with his career in music. Chris Reimer died suddenly in 2012. The other members continued with careers outside of music.

== Discography ==
Albums:

- In Flesh Tones (2008), Absolutely Kosher Records

EPs:

- Mysterious Body (2007), Independent
- Pink and Lime (2008), Independent
- Tubtrek (2009), Independent
