= Run to Ruin =

Studio album by Nina Nastasia
- Released: June 3, 2003
- Recorded: June 2002
- Genre: Folk; alternative rock
- Length: 31:09
- Label: Touch & Go
- Producer: Steve Albini

Nina Nastasia chronology
The Blackened Air (2002)	Run to Ruin (2003)	On Leaving (2006)

Run to Ruin is the third studio album by American singer-songwriter Nina Nastasia. It was recorded by Steve Albini at Black Box studio in Noyant-la-Gravoyère, France and at Looking Glass studio in New York. Released in 2003 by Touch and Go Records, it received universal critical acclaim according to Metacritic with a composite rating of 85, ranking 29th among the best albums of 2003.

Professional ratings
Aggregate scores
Source	Rating
Metacritic	85/100
Review scores
Source	Rating
AllMusic	4/5 stars
Alternative Press	4/5
Mojo	4.5/5 stars
Pitchfork	8.0/10
Q	4/5 stars
Uncut	4.5/5 stars

== Track listing ==
All songs written and composed by Nina Nastasia.

No.	Title	Length
1.	"We Never Talked"	2:50
2.	"I Say That I Will Go"	3:34
3.	"Regrets"	3:15
4.	"You Her and Me"	3:46
5.	"Superstar"	5:15
6.	"The Body"	5:38
7.	"On Teasing"	4:19
8.	"While We Talk"	2:32

Japanese Bonus Track
No.	Title	Length
8.	"While We Talk" / "シンプル・に"	11:01
Total length:		39:35

The Japanese edition of the album features a hidden ghost track placed at the end of the album. The original version of album closer "While We Talk" is followed by several minutes of silence when, at 8:33, an alternate version of the track sung by Nastasia in Japanese begins. The backing track to this Japanese version of "While We Talk" (written in rōmaji as "Simpuru Ni"; which translates literally as "Simpler Thoughts") is identical to the English version, with the exception of some barely audible additional instrumentation (chamberlin and optigan). The Japanese translation for the lyric was provided by Daisuke Miyake, with new instrumentation performed and recorded by Paul Bryan.

== Recording information ==
- Nina Nastasia – Acoustic Guitar, Electric Guitar, Vocals
- Mr. Steven Beck – Piano
- Joshua Carlebach – Accordion, Piano
- Stephen Day – Cello
- Anne Mette Iversen – Upright Bass
- Gerry Leonard – Guitar, Hammer Dulcimer, Banjo
- Dave Richards – Electric Bass
- Jim White – Drums
- Dylan Willemsa – Viola, Violin

Recorded by Steve Albini.
