= On Leaving =

Studio album by Nina Nastasia
- Released: September 11, 2006
- Genre: Folk
- Length: 33:59
- Label: Fat Cat
- Producer: Steve Albini

Nina Nastasia chronology
Run to Ruin (2003)	On Leaving (2006)	You Follow Me (2007)

Professional ratings
Review scores
Source	Rating
Allmusic	link
Pitchfork Media	(7.5/10) link
Stylus	B link

On Leaving is the fourth album by American singer-songwriter Nina Nastasia. It was released on September 11, 2006, on Fat Cat Records. It was recorded by Steve Albini and produced by Nastasia, Kennan Gudjonsson, and Albini. The album received generally favorable reviews; Allmusic considered the album a "deeply poetic record." Stylus Magazine commented the album was "full bodied and masterful, overshadowing many big-footed leading ladies’ recent folk releases." Pitchfork Media found it "difficult to hear Nastasia pull back to a songwriter-with-guitar style."

== Composition and style ==
"Jim's Room" is inspired by Nina Nastasia's father, artist James "Jim" Nastasia, and his series of still-life paintings titled "Francis". Francis was a nude model in her late late 60s or early 70s, whom Nina frequently encountered in her childhood. The song references Nina's memories of both Francis and Jim's smoke-filled art studio in her childhood home.

== Track listing ==
1. "Jim's Room"
2. "Brad Haunts a Party"
3. "Our Day Trip"
4. "Counting Up Your Bones"
5. "Dumb I Am"
6. "Why Don't You Stay Home"
7. "One Old Woman"
8. "Treehouse Song"
9. "Lee"
10. "Settling Song"
11. "Bird of Cuzco"
12. "If We Go to the West"

== Recording information ==
Engineered by Steve Albini at Electrical Audio in Chicago.
