= Emile Kelman =

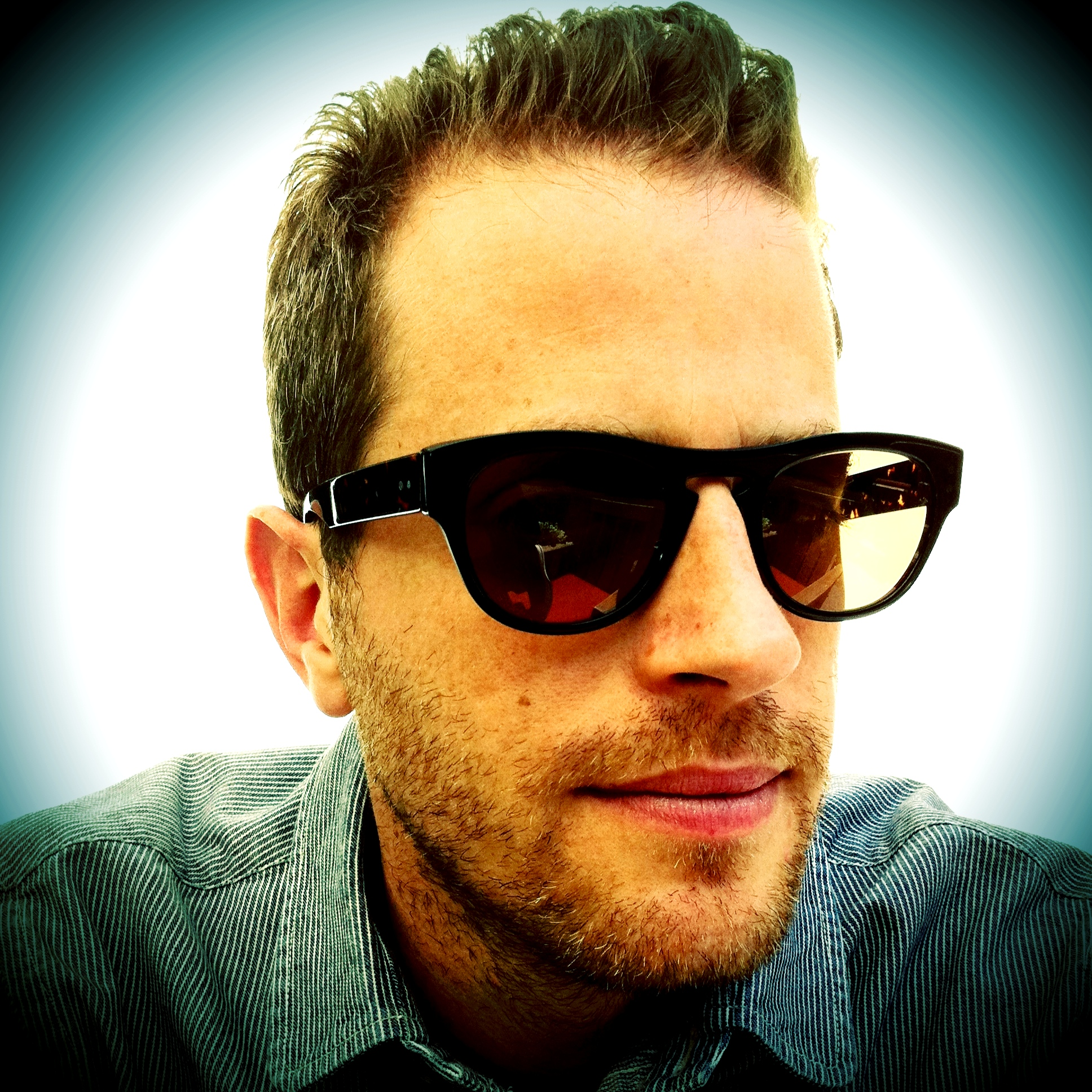

Emile Kelman is an American real estate developer based in West Hollywood, California, United States. Kelman owns and heads Zola Properties which has developed five luxury townhomes in West Hollywood called The Huntley Residences.

Kelman previously had an early career as a record producer and audio engineer, while working with T Bone Burnett since 2007; in addition to Willie Nelson, Robert Plant, B.B. King, John Mellencamp, and Alison Krauss. Kelman has also produced film music such as Crazy Heart, Walk the Line, and Across the Universe.

Kelman produced the album Myth of the Heart for Sahara Smith, a project shepherded by Burnett. Sahara's album features many of the musicians who appeared on the album Raising Sand, such as Jay Bellerose, Marc Ribot, Dennis Crouch, and Greg Leisz. The Los Angeles Times reported of the recording that he "learned his lessons well studying under T Bone Burnett" and gave Sahara's songs "plenty of sonic air in which to breathe".

Kelman has produced several independent records for artists including Bryan Greenberg, with several songs placed on television shows including One Tree Hill, and ABC's October Road. His curiosity with sound has led him to write a large volume of instrumentals with heavy, dark, and tough tones, a number of which were placed in the documentary Dirty Hands about Los Angeles-artist David Choe.

In the winter of 2009, he was music supervisor for Tough Trade, a television pilot produced by T Bone Burnett and Lionsgate.

Kelman is also a classical cellist. Since the age of five he has enjoyed playing with orchestras and chamber music ensembles. He credits most of his advancements in music production to his experience in classical music. He writes string arrangements and plays on records for artists and bands, including a number of the songs he has produced.

== Credits ==
Notable credits include:

| Project | Artist | Credit |
|---|---|---|
| God V. Girl | David Poe | Producer, Engineer, Mixer, Cellos |
| The Ghost & The Scratch | Doran Danoff | Producer, Engineer, Mixer |
| More Townes Van Zandt By The Great Unknown | Leslie Stevens & The Badgers | Producer, Engineer, Mixer |
| Broken Gold | Erin Ivey | Mixer, Arranger |
| Myth of the Heart | Sahara Smith | Producer, Engineer, Mixer, Cellos |
| Untitled | Gregg Allman | Edit Engineer |
| Tough Trade (Pilot) | Television: Lionsgate, Epix | Music Supervisor |
| Country Music | Willie Nelson | 2nd Engineer |
| Women + Country | Jakob Dylan | 2nd Engineer |
| Crazy Heart | Soundtrack | 2nd Engineer |
| We Walk This Road | Robert Randolph | 2nd Engineer |
| Life, Death, Love and Freedom | John Mellencamp | Engineer |
| Akiko | Akiko Yano | 2nd Engineer |
| Loverly | Cassandra Wilson | 2nd Engineer |
| One Kind Favor | B.B. King | 2nd Engineer |
| Still | BoDeans | Engineer |
| Raising Sand | Robert Plant/Allison Krause | 2nd Engineer |
| Across The Universe | Soundtrack | Engineer |
| Waiting For Now | Brian Greenberg | Producer, Engineer, Mixer, Cellos |
| The Story | Brandi Carlile | Engineer |
| Riverside Battle Songs | Ollabelle | 2nd Engineer |
| True False Identity | T Bone Burnett | 2nd Engineer |
| Twenty/Twenty | T Bone Burnett | 2nd Engineer |
| Thunderbird | Cassandra Wilson | 2nd Engineer |
| Teacher's Toolkit | Camp Clovenhoof | Producer, Engineer, Mixer |
| Distant Land To Roam | Ralph Stanley | 2nd Engineer |
| Walk The Line | Soundtrack | 2nd Engineer |
| Howl | Black Rebel Motorcycle Club | 2nd Engineer |
| Ladykillers | Soundtrack | 2nd Engineer |
| Boot and a Shoe | Sam Phillips | 2nd Engineer |
