= Cassandra Wilson Sings Standards =

Sings Standards

Compilation album by Cassandra Wilson
- Released: 2002
- Recorded: 1985–1991
- Genre: Jazz, blues
- Length: 59:23
- Label: Verve
- Producer: Cassandra Wilson, Stefan F. Winter, Steve Coleman, Jean-Paul Bourelly, Richard Seidel

Cassandra Wilson chronology
Belly of the Sun (2002)	Sings Standards (2002)	Glamoured (2003)

Professional ratings
Review scores
Source	Rating
Allmusic	2.5/5 stars

Sings Standards is a compilation album by American jazz singer Cassandra Wilson, released in 2002.

== Track listing ==
1. "Polka Dots and Moonbeams" (Jimmy Van Heusen, Johnny Burke) — 5:45
2. "I Wished on the Moon" (Ralph Rainger, Dorothy Parker) — 3:33
3. "'Round Midnight" (Thelonious Monk, Cootie Williams, Bernie Hanighen) — 5:57
4. "Angel" (Carolyn Franklin, Sonny Saunders) — 4:39
5. "I've Grown Accustomed to His Face" (Alan Jay Lerner, Frederick Loewe) — 5:14
6. "Chelsea Bridge" (Billy Strayhorn) — 6:30
7. "I'm Old Fashioned" (Jerome Kern, Johnny Mercer) — 3:06
8. "Baubles, Bangles & Beads" (Robert Wright, George Forrest) — 6:36
9. "Blue Skies" (Irving Berlin) — 3:09
10. "Blue in Green" (Miles Davis, Bill Evans) — 4:09
11. "Body and Soul" (Edward Heyman, Robert Sour, Frank Eyton, Johnny Green) — 10:39

== Personnel ==
- Cassandra Wilson – vocals, acoustic guitar
- Terri Lyne Carrington – drums
- Mark Johnson – drums
- Kevin Bruce Harris – bass
- Lonnie Plaxico – bass
- Reggie Washington – bass
- Mulgrew Miller – piano
- James Weidman – piano
- Rod Williams – piano
- Jean-Paul Bourelly – guitar
- Grachan Moncur III – trombone

Production notes

- Jean-Paul Bourelly – producer
- Steve Coleman – producer
- Richard Seidel – producer
- Danny Kopelson – engineer, mixing
- Kevin Reeves – mastering
- Mark Smith – production assistant
- Hollis King – art direction
- John Abbott – photography
- Tom Terrell – liner notes
- Ken Druker – executive producer
- Peter Pullman – editing

== Chart performance ==
Chart (2002)	Peak position
US Jazz Albums (Billboard)	18
