= Silver Pony =

Studio album by Cassandra Wilson
- Released: November 9, 2010
- Studios: Piety Street Recording (New Orleans, Louisiana) and other locations
- Genres: Jazz, blues, pop
- Length: 61:16
- Label: Blue Note
- Producers: John Fischbach, Cassandra Wilson

Cassandra Wilson chronology
Loverly (2008)	Silver Pony (2010)	Another Country (2012)

Professional ratings
Aggregate scores
Source	Rating
Metacritic	75/100
Review scores
Source	Rating
The Absolute Sound	3.5/5 stars
All About Jazz	4.5/5 stars
AllMusic	4/5 stars
The Buffalo News	3/4 stars
Financial Times	4/5 stars
The Guardian	4/5 stars
Paste	7.6/10
PopMatters	6/10
The Telegraph	3/5 stars
Tom Hull	B

Silver Pony is a studio album by American jazz singer Cassandra Wilson, released in November 2010 on Blue Note Records. A mixture of live and studio-recorded tracks, it was produced by Wilson and John Fischbach. The release includes jazz, blues and pop standards, as well as original music by Wilson and her band. Saxophonist Ravi Coltrane and singer John Legend make guest appearances.

The album received mixed, but generally positive, reviews from critics. Reviewers complimented Wilson's vocals and particularly enjoyed the focus on her band. More negative reviews came from critics who felt that Silver Pony was below Wilson's usual standard and contained little originality. The album reached No. 6 on the Billboard Jazz Albums chart.

== Composition and recording ==
Silver Pony is a jazz and blues album, with some elements of pop music. The tracks include live improvisations created by Wilson and her band on tour in Warsaw, Seville, and Granada as well as jazz and blues standards. The album opens with a live version of "Lover Come Back to Me", a 1920s popular song from The New Moon by Oscar Hammerstein II and Sigmund Romberg. This is one of three live tracks that appeared as studio-recorded versions on Wilson's previous album, Loverly (2008); the others are the traditional song "Went Down to St James Infirmary" and "A Day in the Life of a Fool" by Luiz Bonfá. "Saddle Up My Pony" is a version of the 1929 Delta blues song "Pony Blues" by Charley Patton.

The album was produced by Wilson and John Fischbach. In addition to the recordings made on tour in Europe, the album was recorded and produced at Fischbach's Piety Street Recording studio in New Orleans. Wilson's regular band consisted of Marvin Sewell on guitar, Jonathan Batiste on piano, Reginald Veal on bass, Herlin Riley on drums and Lekan Babalola on percussion. The album features guest appearances by John Legend on "Watch the Sunrise" and a saxophone solo by Ravi Coltrane on "Beneath a Silver Moon".

The album title and cover art are inspired by an incident from Wilson's childhood in Jackson, Mississippi; "A man came around ... with a pony and camera, and you could pay to get your picture taken." Although Wilson's brothers were not interested, her mother allowed her to be photographed on the pony, and the image of Wilson is used on the album cover.

== Reception ==
Writing for JazzTimes, Carlo Wolff gave the album a positive review. He praised "Beneath a Silver Moon" and "Saddle Up My Pony" in particular, and described Wilson's band as "exceptional". He questioned the inclusion of the two instrumental tracks because of the change in pace they brought but said that overall, the album "reaffirms Wilson's status as a premier jazz singer". Steve Leggett of AllMusic gave the album a rating of four stars out of five. He described it as "a light, shimmering sound" and felt that despite the different styles and mix of live and studio material, the album remains cohesive. In a review for The Guardian, John Fordham gave the album four stars out of five. He noted a continuation of "confidence and focus" from her previous album, Loverly. He described the track list as "powerfully compatible".

Reviewing the album for BBC Music, John Eyles was complimentary and said that it continues a "rich vein of form" begun with 1993's Blue Light 'til Dawn. He praised Wilson's voice and noted that with Silver Pony, her band are no longer overshadowed. Jim Farber of New York's Daily News noted the equality between Wilson and her band and the balance between her vocals and their instrumentals. He enjoyed the contrast between Wilson's soft vocals and the fast tempo of the songs and noted the seamless transitions between live and studio-recorded tracks. He praised Wilson's growth as an artist in the time since her last live recordings, on 1991's Live. In a review for Paste, Stephen Deusner gave Silver Pony a "commendable" rating of 7.6 out of 10. He described "Went Down to St James Infirmary" and "Saddle Up My Pony" as the best tracks on the album. He praised the band and called them the "true stars" of the album. Although he commented that Wilson voice has improved over the years, on this album he felt that she was just a "support player", and enjoyed least the songs that strongly featured her voice.

Will Layman of PopMatters gave Silver Pony a more negative review, awarding it six stars out of ten. Although he described Wilson's vocals as "deep and delicious", and the tracks as "fun and funky", his opinion was that the album "rehashed" her Wilson's previous work. He said that although new listeners might be impressed, fans would not find anything new. He praised the band, and enjoyed the renditions of "Forty Days and Forty Nights" and "If It's Magic". However, overall he found the album "inessential and merely fine". The Independent's Phil Johnson gave the album a similarly mixed review, suggesting that it "might mark time more than break new ground". Writing for The Daily Telegraph, Ivan Hewlett gave the album a three star rating. He noted that it was "firmly in the territory" of Wilson's usual eclectic style, that combines blues, funk and the Great American Songbook. He complimented Wilson's "astonishing" voice and "wonderful" band but felt that the album as a whole was "all too smooth to be really engaging".

An unnamed reviewer from the Associated Press gave the album a rating of three and a half stars. They noted the album's mix of live and studio recordings and commented that this was Wilson "back to her trademark eclectic ways". The reviewer praised the band and particularly enjoyed their improvisation on "Lover Come Back to Me". Overall, they thought Silver Pony was "above-average", but inconsistent and below Wilson's usual standard. Writing for Boston.com, Steve Greenlee commented that Wilson's mixed-genre style is no longer innovative, but feels natural. He particularly praised the contributions of Wilson's band members.

== Chart performance ==
Silver Pony peaked at No. 6 on the Billboard Jazz Albums chart and reached No. 21 on the Top Heatseekers Albums chart.

== Track listing ==
1. "Lover Come Back to Me" (Oscar Hammerstein II/Sigmund Romberg) – 6:51
2. "Went down to St. James Infirmary" (Irving Mills) – 7:14
3. "A Night in Seville" – 3:00
4. "Beneath a Silver Moon" – 6:39
5. "Saddle up My Pony" (Charley Patton) – 9:32
6. "If It's Magic" (Stevie Wonder) – 4:34
7. "Forty Days and Forty Nights" (Bernard Roth) – 4:59
8. "Silver Pony" – 0:36
9. "A Day in the Life of a Fool" (Luiz Bonfá) – 7:35
10. "Blackbird" (Lennon/McCartney) – 6:45
11. "Watch the Sunrise" (J. Stephens, Luke Laird, Steven Dale Jones) – 3:31
- Tracks 1–3, 5 and 9 were recorded live in Europe (Granada, Seville and Warsaw).
- Tracks 4, 6–8, 10 and 11 were recorded at Piety Street Recording studio in New Orleans, LA.
- Tracks 3, 4 and 8 written by, tracks 2 and 5 arranged by Wilson, Riley, Batiste, Babalola, Sewell, Veal.

== Personnel ==
From Discogs.

Musicians and Vocalists

- Cassandra Wilson – vocals (all tracks, except 3), synthesizers (4), bass drum (11)
- Jonathan Batiste – piano (exc. 3, 11), Fender Rhodes (3)
- Marvin Sewell – electric guitar (exc. 6, 11), acoustic guitar (6)
- Reginald Veal – acoustic bass (1, 2, 5, 7–9), electric bass (4, 6, 10)
- Herlin Riley – drums (exc. 6, 11)
- Lekan Babalola – percussion (exc. 1, 6, 11)
- Ravi Coltrane – tenor saxophone (4)
- John Legend – piano and vocals (11)
- Brandon Ross – acoustic guitar (11)
- Luke Laird – acoustic rhythm guitar (11)
- Helen Gillet – cello (11), vielle (11)

Production

- John Fischbach and Cassandra Wilson – producer
- Jon Batiste, Marvin Sewell, Reginald Veal, Herlin Riley and Lekan Babalola – associate producer
- Eli Wolf – A&R
- Antwon Jackson – A&R administrator
- Shanieka D. Brooks – product manager
- Gordon H. Jee – creative director
- Burton Yount – art direction, design
- Rachel Salomon – cover illustration
- Will Sterling – photography
- Larry Blumenfeld – liner notes

Technical credits

- Don Juan Holder – live recording
- Tobias Lange – live recording assistant
- John Fischbach – recording, mixing
- Wesley Fontenot – assistant engineer, Pro Tools
- Bob Katz – mastering at Digital Domain (Almonte Springs, Florida)
