= Marvin Sewell =

American blues/jazz guitarist

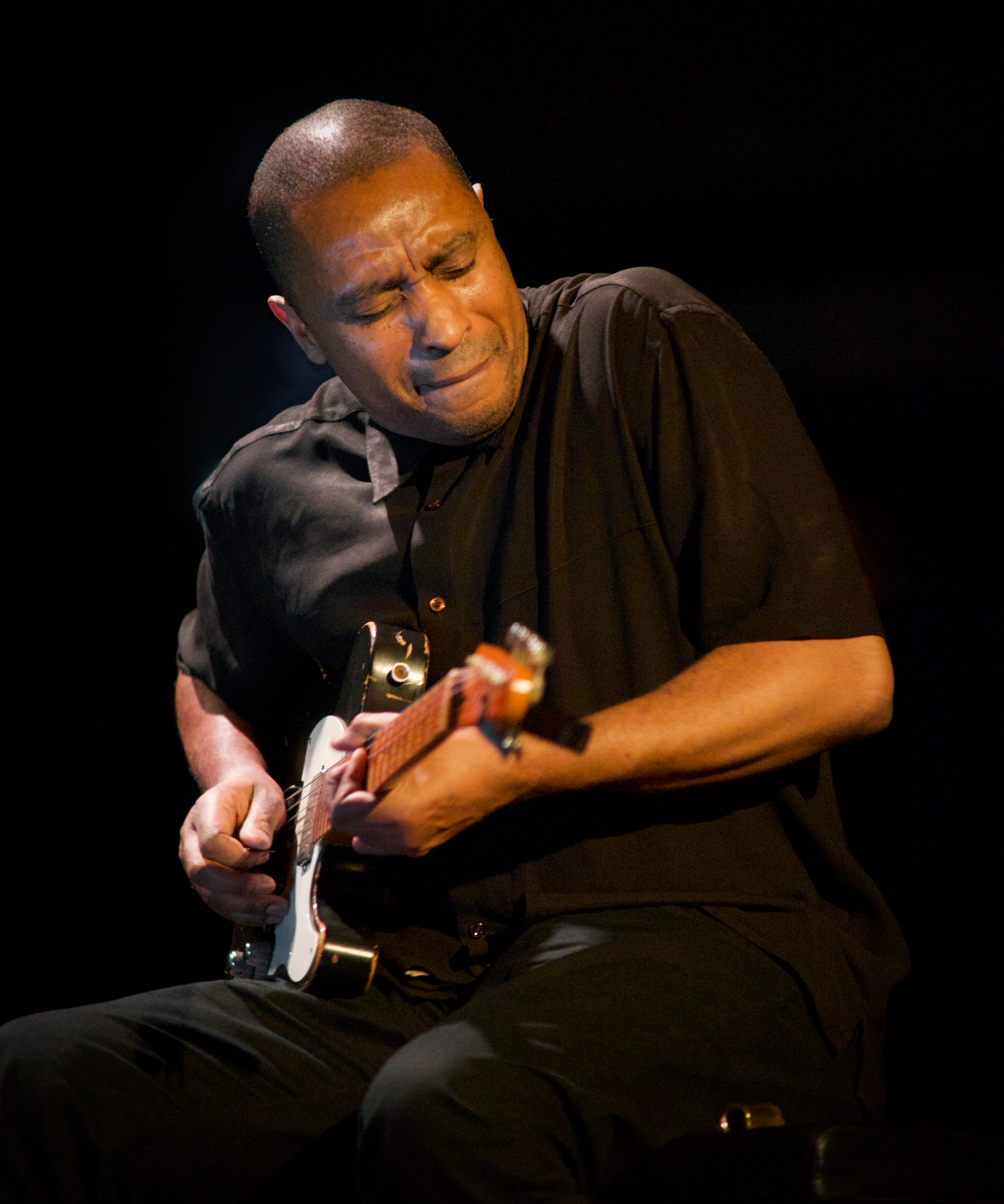
Marvin Sewell in 2019

Marvin Sewell is an American blues/jazz guitarist from Chicago.

== Biography ==
He was born and grew up in Chicago, where he attended the Chicago Musical College at Roosevelt University. Since 1990, he has been based in New York City.

Sewell has played with many leading jazz artists, notably Cassandra Wilson, Jack DeJohnette, Lizz Wright and Jason Moran. He performed with Cassandra Wilson on two tracks in the 2003 PBS documentary, Martin Scorsese Presents the Blues: A Musical Journey. He also leads the Marvin Sewell Group.

Sewell has been called maybe "the greatest guitarist you've never heard of".

== Discography ==
=== As leader ===
- The Worker's Dance (2005)

=== As sideman ===
With Regina Carter

- Southern Comfort (2014)
- Ella: Accentuate the Positive (2017)

With Jason Moran

- Same Mother (2005)
- Artist in Residence (2006)

With Christian Sands

- Be Water (2020)
- Christmas Stories (2023)
- Embracing Dawn (2024)

With Gary Thomas

- Exile's Gate, (1993)
- Overkill (1996)

With Cassandra Wilson

- Traveling Miles (1999)
- Belly of the Sun (2002)
- Loverly (2008)
- Closer to You: The Pop Side (2009)
- Silver Pony (2010)

With Lizz Wright

- Fellowship (2010)
- Grace (2017)

With others

- Alexis Cole, Dazzling Blue: The Music of Paul Simon (2016)
- Brian Blade, Landmarks (2014)
- Jack DeJohnette, Extra Special Edition (1994)
- Orrin Evans, The Evolution of Oneself (2015)
- Tom Harrell, Wise Children (2003)
- Yoron Israel, Chicago (1999)
- Charles Lloyd, Figure in Blue (2025) with Jason Moran
- René Marie, How Can I Keep from Singing? (2000)
- Cécile McLorin Salvant, Ghost Song (2022)
- Diedre Murray and Fred Hopkins, Stringology (1993)
- Greg Osby, Art Forum (1996)
- Lonnie Plaxico, With All Your Heart (1993)
- Dianne Reeves, Beautiful Life (2014)
- David Sanborn, Inside (1999)
