= Abie Ames =

American jazz musician

Abie "Boogaloo" Ames

Personal details
- Born: May 23, 1918 Cruger, Mississippi, U.S.
- Died: February 4, 2002 (aged 83) Greenville, Mississippi, U.S.
- Spouse: Gracie

Abie "Boogaloo" Ames (May 23, 1918 – February 4, 2002) was an American blues and jazz pianist.

== Biography ==
Ames was born in 1918 on Big Egypt Plantation in Cruger, Mississippi.

He began playing the piano at the age of five. Sometime in the 1930s, when he was a teenager, his family moved to Detroit.

By the late 1940s, Ames was leading his own band. Throughout the following decade, the band played around Detroit and other Northern cities, performing at nightspots like the Brass Rail Theater Bar and Baker's Keyboard Lounge, with various big name musicians passing through Detroit, including Nat King Cole and Erroll Garner. Around this time he picked up the nickname "Boogaloo".

In the early 1960s, Ames did session work at Berry Gordy's fledgling Motown studio, but as the Detroit jazz scene gave way to Motown, he moved back to Carrollton, Mississippi, near his birthplace, to be with a woman named Gracie. In Mississippi, he began working as a piano tuner at the Baldwin Piano Company in Greenwood and playing music to the predominantly white, wealthy social class. For nearly 40 years, Amess was a fixture at Mississippi's elite parties, country clubs and restaurants. He performed often as a soloist but was also the principal member of several jazz groups. With the blues revival of the 1970s and for the remainder of his life, he continued playing boogie-woogie and blues, performing regularly at the Mississippi Delta Blues Festival and also at the Chicago Blues Festival.

Ames also taught many students over the years, including pianist and Greenwood native Mulgrew Miller, to whom he gave his first jazz piano lessons. He moved to Greenville in 1980. After Gracie's death in the 1980s, Ames moved to Greenville and began teaching Eden Brent. Their long relationship (until his death) was the subject of an award-winning 1999 television documentary, Boogaloo & Eden: Sustaining the Sound. The duo received the Mississippi Arts Commission Folk Arts Apprenticeship, toured the state, and then traveled to New York, Philadelphia and Washington, D.C., where they performed at the Kennedy Center. Ames' last performance took place in October 2001 in Greenville. The duo's final appearance together was in the 2002 South African television production, Forty Days in the Delta, a blues documentary series taped in Mississippi shortly before Ames' death. In addition to this posthumous appearance, Ames performed the duet "Darkness on the Delta" with Cassandra Wilson on her 2002 album, Belly of the Sun.

In his last years, Boogaloo accepted numerous awards including the Greenville Arts Council Lifetime Achievement, the Mississippi Arts Commission Artist Fellowship and the Mississippi Governor's Award for Excellence in the Arts. He is memorialized on the Greenville Blues Walk in the Walnut Street entertainment district. He died on February 4, 2002, following a long illness and is buried at Lakewood Cemetery in Greenville.
