= Cooters =

Cooters may refer to:

- Pseudemys, a genus of turtle often called 'cooters'.

== See also ==
- Cooter (disambiguation)
