= Fowlkes =

Fowlkes is a surname. Notable people with the surname include:

- Alan Fowlkes (born 1958), American retired professional baseball player
- Charles Fowlkes (1916–1980), American baritone saxophonist
- Curtis Fowlkes (1950–2023), American jazz trombonist
- Eddie Fowlkes (born 1962), American techno DJ
- Herman Fowlkes Jr. (1919–1993), American jazz musician and educator
- Lauren Fowlkes (born 1988), American soccer player
- Tremaine Fowlkes (born 1976), American professional basketball player
