= Thunderbird (Cassandra Wilson album) =

Studio album by Cassandra Wilson
- Released: April 4, 2006
- Studios: Capitol Studios (Hollywood, California) The Village Recorder, Electro Magnetic Studio and The Green Room (Los Angeles, California) Dangerous Music Studio (New York City, New York)
- Genres: Jazz, Delta blues, Americana
- Length: 49:50
- Label: Blue Note
- Producers: T Bone Burnett; Keefus Ciancia; J.D. Foster

Cassandra Wilson chronology
Glamoured (2003)	Thunderbird (2006)	Loverly (2008)

Professional ratings
Review scores
Source	Rating
All About Jazz	4/5 stars
AllMusic	3.5/5 stars
The Buffalo News	3/4 stars
Tom Hull	B
Now	2/5 Ns
The Penguin Guide to Jazz	2.5/4 stars
PopMatters	9/10

Thunderbird is a studio album by American jazz singer Cassandra Wilson. The record was released on the Blue Note label on April 4, 2006. The album was produced by T Bone Burnett and Keefus Ciancia, both of whom also substantially contributed to the release. Among the lineup are guitarist Marc Ribot, rock drummer Jim Keltner, as well as bassists Mike Elizondo and Reginald Veal, completed by guests like Keb' Mo' and Grégoire Maret. In the Billboard 200 chart, the album peaked at #184; in the chart of the Best Jazz Albums of the same magazine, Thunderbird peaked at #2.

== Reception ==
Kevin Jones of Exclaim! wrote: "After years of playing it straight with her roots-y approach to standard jazz, blues and folk sounds, singer Cassandra Wilson has recently moved (rather measurably) left towards a more modern feel, her results garnering mixed reviews from her purist fan base. Her latest effort, Thunderbird, continues unapologetically in that same direction... Though as deep, rich and dreamy as ever, its natural sleepiness leaves you fighting disinterest, even on the most danceable tracks. With Thunderbird, you're left with the sense that, while one day in the right hands this voice will drop something truly special and far reaching, that day is still a few tweaks and stylistic shifts off." Tim Perlich of NOW commented: "There's as much truth as ever to the age-old record-biz axiom that jazz recordings don't sell, but Norah Jones and Diana Krall have proven that jazzy recordings do. The folks at Blue Note know this, so it makes sense that Cassandra Wilson's new Thunderbird isn't jazz but, rather, an attempt at making a contemporary-sounding bluesy roots album that people under the age of 40 might want to hear." The Buffalo News review by Jeff Simon noted, "So gorgeous, though, is that dark, pillowy contralto — as amazing a vocal sound as exists anywhere in current American music — that you simply acquiesce to all of her stubborn detours around her own genius."

Martin Johnson of Paste Magazine stated: "...the recording's broad, open sound is built around keyboards rather than small percussion instruments and gentle acoustic guitars. But the change in music hasn’t altered Wilson’s overall aesthetic; she’s still delving deeply into the roots of the Delta and celebrating its eclectic possibilities. The recording takes its name from the Native American legend about the animal that brought calm and growth to its haunts, and Wilson claims this spirit guided the collaboration... Many of her Blue Skies fans resented her Blue Light... material and the music that followed, deeming it a sell-out. But she eventually won over most doubters. And with thunderbird, she’s poised to do it again."

== Track listing ==
1. "Go to Mexico" (Keith Ciancia, Mike Elizondo, Cassandra Wilson; contains a sample of "Hey Pocky A-Way" written by Zigaboo Modeliste, Art Neville, Leo Nocentelli and George Porter, Jr, from the album The Wild Tchoupitoulas) – 4:14
2. "Closer to You" (Jakob Dylan) – 5:49
3. "Easy Rider" (Traditional) – 7:03
4. "It Would Be So Easy" (Ciancia, Elizondo, Mike Piersante, Wilson) – 5:10
5. "Red River Valley" (Traditional) – 5:52
6. "Poet" (Ciancia, Wilson) – 5:27
7. "I Want to Be Loved" (Willie Dixon) – 4:03
8. "Lost" (Joseph Henry Burnett) – 3:34
9. "Strike a Match" (Burnett, Ethan Coen) – 4:47
10. "Tarot" (Ciancia, Keltner, Wilson) – 3:51

== Personnel ==
Credits according to the album's booklet (double and triple instrumentations are not errors).

- Cassandra Wilson – vocals, acoustic guitar (tracks 2, 10), arrangements (3, 5)
- Keefus Ciancia – piano (1–3, 9), keyboards (except 5, 8), programming (1, 4, 6), electric bass (3, 6, 10), synth strings (9)
- Marc Ribot – guitars (3–4, 6, 8, 10)
- Colin Linden – guitars (3, 5–7), arrangements (3, 5)
- Keb' Mo' – guitars (7)
- Reginald Veal – double bass (1–2, 4, 10), electric bass (6)
- Mike Elizondo – electric bass (3 intro, 4 , 7, 10), double bass and synth strings (9), programming (1)
- Jim Keltner – drums (1–3, 6–7, 10)
- Bill Maxwell – drums (3, 6–7, 9)
- Jay Bellerose – drums (4, 6, 9)
- Grégoire Maret – harmonica (10)
- Mike Piersante– synth percussion (10)

== Production ==
- T Bone Burnett – producer
- Keefus Ciancia – co-producer, additional engineer
- J. D. Foster – co-producer (track 8)
- Mike Piersante – recording, mixing
- Francçois Lardeau, Steve Rodby, Andy Taub, Steve Genewick, Emile Kelman, Jason Wormer – assistant engineers
- Gavin Lurssen – mastering at The Mastering Lab (Hollywood, California)
- Paul Ackling – technical support
- Ivy Skoff – production manager
- Lisa Surber – production assistant
- Eli Wolf – A&R
- Chris Cofoni, Keith Karwelies – A&R administration
- Shanieka D. Brooks – product manager
- Gordon H. Jee – art direction, design
- Melanie Dunea – cover photography
- Clay Patrick McBride – inlay photography
- Irene and Paul Zukoski for Front Row Productions, Inc. – management

== Chart performance ==
Chart (2006)	Peak position
US Jazz Albums (Billboard)	2
