= Belly of the Sun =

Studio album by Cassandra Wilson
- Released: February 26, 2002
- Recorded: Clarksdale, Mississippi on Wally Heider mobile unit
- Studios: Clarksdale Train Depot and a boxcar; Allairre Studios South (New York City, New York)
- Genre: Jazz
- Length: 60:09
- Label: Blue Note
- Producer: Cassandra Wilson

Cassandra Wilson chronology
Traveling Miles (1999)	Belly of the Sun (2002)	Glamoured (2003)

Professional ratings
Review scores
Source	Rating
All About Jazz	favorable
AllMusic	3.5/5 stars
The Buffalo News	3.5/4 stars
laut.de	4/5 stars
Now	3/5 Ns
The Penguin Guide to Jazz	3/4 stars
Rolling Stone	3/5 stars
Tom Hull	B+

Belly of the Sun is a studio album by American jazz singer Cassandra Wilson. It was released on the Blue Note label in 2002.

== Background ==
The title of the CD comes from a line in "Only a Dream in Rio" that Wilson had translated to Yoruba "... just to hear what it sounded like and it was explained [to Wilson] that in the Yoruba translation you would say 'in the belly of the sun.'"

India.Arie is a guest vocalist on "Just Another Parade".

Recording was done in a Clarksdale, Mississippi train station. Additional recording was done at Allairre Studios South, New York, NY.

== Reception ==
J. D. Coniside of The Rolling Stone wrote: "With a voice as rich and caramel-y as Sarah Vaughan's, and a delivery as intimately conversational as Joni Mitchell's, Cassandra Wilson is the perfect jazz singer for people who don't particularly like jazz singing... Still, Belly of the Sun feels uncomfortably empty at points". David R. Adler of AllMusic stated: "Cassandra Wilson continues to move down a highly eclectic path on Belly of the Sun, the somewhat belated follow-up to Traveling Miles. While displaying a jazz singer's mastery of melodic nuance and improvisatory phrasing, Wilson draws on a variety of non-jazz idioms -- roots music, rock, Delta blues, country, soul -- to create a kind of earthy, intelligent pop with obvious crossover appeal".

Marshall Bowden of PopMatters commented: " If, despite all that, all you can worry about is whether Belly of the Sun is a "real" jazz album or not, it's your problem, not Cassandra's. The table has been set and the meal is a sumptuous one. Whether you partake or not is your gain or loss."

== Track listing ==
1. "The Weight" (Robbie Robertson) – 6:05
2. "Justice" (Cassandra Wilson) – 5:27
3. "Darkness on the Delta" (Jay Livingston, Al J. Neiburg, Marty Symes) – 3:47
4. "Waters of March" (Antônio Carlos Jobim) – 4:26
5. "You Gotta Move" (Mississippi Fred McDowell) – 2:44
6. "Only a Dream in Rio" (James Taylor) – 4:32
7. "Just Another Parade" (Wilson) – 6:05
8. "Wichita Lineman" (Jimmy Webb) – 5:48
9. "Shelter from the Storm" (Bob Dylan) – 5:17
10. "Drunk as Cooter Brown" (Wilson) – 4:58
11. "Show Me a Love" (Jesse Robinson, Wilson) – 3:49
12. "Road So Clear" (Rhonda Richmond) – 5:22
13. "Hot Tamales" (Robert Johnson) – 1:43
14. "Corcovado" (Antônio Carlos Jobim) (For Japan only) – 5:19

There was a promotional version of this album distributed before the album was released that contained two extra tracks that were not included on the final release. The promotional copy has "Rock Me Baby" (B. B. King) after "Shelter from the Storm" and before "Cooter Brown", and "Little Lion" (Caetano Veloso) after "Cooter Brown" and before "Show Me a Love". The promotional version was a regular pressed and silk-screened disc (not a CD-R) and came in a cardboard sleeve and had no album artwork.

== Personnel ==
Vocalists

- Cassandra Wilson – vocals
- Children of M.S.44 (NYC) – vocals (4)
- Cyro Baptista – vocals (5)
- Kevin Breit – vocals (5)
- Richard Johnston – vocals (5)
- Rhonda Richmond – vocals (5, 7, 12)
- Jewell Bass – vocals (6)
- Vasti Jackson – vocals (6)
- Patrice Moncell – vocals (6)
- Henry Rhodes – vocals (6)
- India.Arie – vocals (7)

Musicians

- "Boogaloo" Ames – acoustic piano (3)
- Rhonda Richmond – acoustic piano (12)
- Kevin Breit – electric guitar (1, 2), slide guitar (1, 4), mandolin (1, 10, 14), acoustic guitar (4), EBow guitar (6), 12-string banjo (6), bouzouki (7), resonator guitar (8), Omnichord (10)
- Marvin Sewell – acoustic guitar (1, 2, 6, 8–10, 14), guitars (4, 13), "left and right" guitars (7), wah electric guitar (11), electric guitar (12)
- Richard Johnston – guitars (5)
- Cassandra Wilson – sarod (6), "center" guitar (7)
- Jesse Robinson – electric guitar (11)
- Mark Peterson – acoustic bass (1, 2, 4, 7–9, 11, 14), fretless electric bass (6, 12), electric bass (10)
- Xavyon Jamison – drums (1, 2, 6, 11, 12)
- Cyro Baptista – percussion (1, 2, 4, 6–8, 10–12, 14), bass drum (9)
- Jeff Haynes – percussion (1, 2, 6–8, 10–12, 14), plastic tub (5, 13), steel pans (10)
- Olu Dara – trumpet (12)

== Production ==
- Bruce Lundvall – executive producer
- Michael Simanga – executive producer, liner notes, management
- Cassandra Wilson – producer
- Danny Kopelson – engineer, mixing
- Sean Macke – additional engineer
- Michael Barbour – assistant engineer
- Matthew Cullen – assistant engineer
- Suzanne Kapa – assistant engineer
- Steve Lowney – assistant engineer
- Brandon Mason – assistant engineer
- Greg Calbi – mastering at Sterling Sound (New York, NY)
- Judy Jefferson – production coordinator (Mississippi)
- Donald Thomas – production consultant
- Zach Hochkeppel – product manager
- Gordon H. Jee – creative director
- Hat Nguyen – art direction, design
- Jack Spencer – cover and interior photography
- Patrick Molnar – interior photography
- Gwinnis Mosby – make-up
- Keith Brown – styling
- Dwana Makeba – hair

== Chart positions ==
Year	Chart	Position
2002	Billboard Top Jazz Albums	2
2002	Billboard Heatseekers	4
2002	Billboard The Billboard 200	155
2002	Billboard Top Internet Albums	156
