= Point of View (Cassandra Wilson album) =

Studio album by Cassandra Wilson
- Released: 1986
- Recorded: December 1985
- Studio: Systems Two (Brooklyn, New York)
- Genre: Jazz
- Length: 42:16
- Label: JMT
- Producer: Stefan F. Winter; Steve Coleman

Cassandra Wilson chronology
Point of View (1986)	Days Aweigh (1987)

Point of View is the debut studio album by American jazz singer Cassandra Wilson, recorded in Brooklyn, New York, in December 1985, as the fourth release of the German JMT label in 1986. It was also one of the first albums of a group of musicians around Steve Coleman, that became known as M-Base.

== Reception ==
Professional ratings
Review scores
Source	Rating
Allmusic	4/5 stars
The Encyclopedia of Popular Music	3/5 stars
Penguin Guide to Jazz on CD	3/4 stars
The Rolling Stone Jazz & Blues Album Guide	2.5/5 stars
The Virgin Encyclopedia of Eighties Music	3/5 stars

Writing for Allmusic on the occasion of the albums reissue on Winter & Winter in 2001, Scott Yanow gave the album a star rating of four out of five and praised Wilson's effort to "find a role for her voice" among "overcrowded ensembles". He described Wilson as a "chance-taking singer in a funky M-Base setting."

== Track listing ==
1. "Square Roots" (Cassandra Wilson) – 4:39
2. "Blue in Green" (Miles Davis, Bill Evans, Wilson) – 4:10
3. "Never" (Steve Coleman, Wilson) – 4:41
4. "Desperate Move" (Coleman) – 7:58
5. "Love & Hate" (Grachan Moncur III) – 8:19
6. "I Am Waiting" (Wilson) – 3:39
7. "I Wished on the Moon" (Dorothy Parker, Ralph Rainger) – 3:35
8. "I Thought You Knew" (Jean-Paul Bourelly) – 5:36

== Personnel ==
Band

- Cassandra Wilson – vocals
- Jean-Paul Bourelly – guitars
- Lonnie Plaxico – electric bass, acoustic bass
- Mark Johnson – drums
- Steve Coleman – percussion alto saxophone
- Grachan Moncur III – trombone

Production

- Stefan F. Winter – producer
- Steve Coleman – producer
- Joe Marciano – engineer
- Christine Paxmann – cover design
- Scott Sternbach – back cover photography
- Hans Georg Biberstein – photography

Reissue

- Adrian Von Ripka – remastering
- Günter Mattei – cover design
- Joseph Gasu Rittenberg – photography
