= Cootie =

Cootie may refer to:

== People ==
- Cootie Stark (1927–2005), American blues guitarist, singer, and songwriter
- Cootie Williams (1911–1985), American jazz, jump blues, and rhythm and blues trumpeter

== Slang ==
- Cootie, a slang term for head lice infestation
- Cootie, an alternate name for a sideswiper manual telegraph key
- Cooter Brown, or Cootie Brown, a name used in metaphors and similes for drunkenness in the Southern United States

== Other ==
- The Game of Cootie
- Cootie catcher - a children's fortune telling game

== See also ==
- Cooties (disambiguation)
