= Cooter =

Cooter may refer to: Joshua Johnson. Cooter Johnson is the catcher for the Hometown Bears.

== Arts and entertainment ==
- Cooter (band), the original name of the punk band Autopilot Off
- "Cooter" (30 Rock), a 2008 television episode
- "Cooter" (Gunsmoke), a 1956 television episode
- Cooter Davenport, a character from the TV show The Dukes of Hazzard and subsequent movie
- Cooter Fingerwood, a character on the TV show The Adventures of Pete & Pete
- Cooter, a coyote character from the Canadian children's television show Size Small

== People ==
- Robert Cooter (born 1945), economics and law professor
- Jim Bob Cooter (born 1984), offensive coordinator of the New York Jets

== Other uses ==
- Cooter, Missouri, a US city
  - Cooter Township, Pemiscot County, Missouri, an inactive township named after the city
- Cooter Brown, a name used in metaphors for drunkenness
- Cooter turtle (genus Pseudemys), various freshwater turtles
- A slang term for the vulva
