= Minnie Klavans =

American artist (1915–1999)

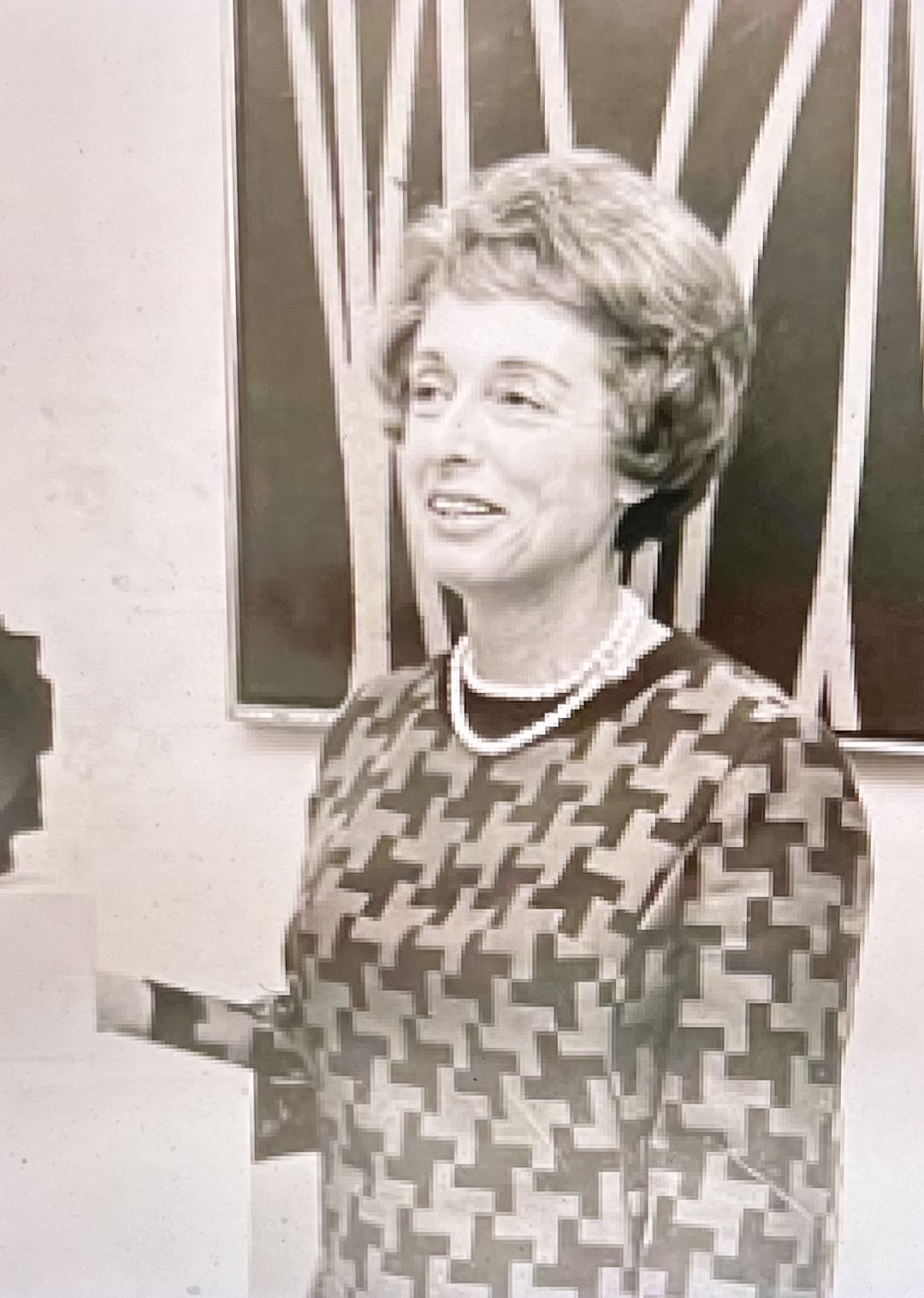
- Minnie Klavans in 1972.
- Born: May 10, 1915; Garrett Park, Maryland, U.S.
- Died: September 19, 1999 (aged 84); Washington, DC

Minnie Klavans (May 10, 1915 – September 19, 1999) was an American artist whose work is held by the Smithsonian Museum of American Art, the Baltimore Museum of Art, the American University Museum, among others.

== Life and work ==
=== Early life ===
Minnie Klavans (née Farber) was born in Garrett Park, Maryland on May 10, 1915. She was the second child of Eastern-European Jewish immigrants, Samuel Farber (1882–1956) and Annie Farber (née Koblen, 1877–1943). She had an older brother, Leon Farber (1932–2008), who was a jazz percussionist and a younger brother Melvin Farber (1925–1951), a pilot and World War II bombardier who died in a training accident.

=== Education ===
Klavans studied at Wilson Teachers College in Washington, DC, graduating in 1935. From 1939 to 1943 she worked as a personnel officer in the War Department.

In 1951, Klavans enrolled in a silversmithing course at the YMCA and started working on design, soldering, stone-setting and other metalwork. Her designs were intricate, complex, exacting and time-consuming. She set up a small workshop in an unused corner in the dark musty basement of her home and worked assiduously on the many complicated phases of her creations. Just over one year after starting her silversmithing, she entered a pin into the Smithsonian Institution's Metropolitan State Art Contest and placed first in silversmithing 1953. She continued with metalwork for another year, entered a bracelet and again, won a first-place award in 1954. She continued silversmithing on the side, Klavans decided to move to graphic art and painting. In 1956, she signed up for a painting class at the YMCA in Washington D.C. In 1957, she started studying at American University with Luciano Penay (formerly Luciano Pena y Lillo), then a newly hired Professor of Art.

=== Career ===
Kavans began painting and sculpture later in life, starting her career after age 40. She exhibited in Washington DC, New York City, Madrid, and Bilbao, Spain with an exhibit that toured six Spanish cities including Bilbao, Barcelona and Valencia. Her work is largely non-representational hard edge abstract, acrylic on canvas. Klavans worked in acrylic, watercolor, and felt-tip pen on handmade paper (which she made), rice paper, canvas, linen, metal, cardboard and cloth.

In 1958, Klavans co-established a group of 11 painters who, for the next 35 years worked under the tutelage of Professor Pinay. Group 11, as it was known, held several group shows in galleries in Washington, Maryland and Virginia including the Mickelson’s Gallery and the Emerson Gallery.

Her work is included in the collections of the Smithsonian American Art Museum and the American University Museum.

=== Death ===
Klavans continued to paint, draw and create multimedia works until her death from cancer at age 84.

== Exhibitions and collections ==
Klavans has had pieces accepted in the Corcoran Gallery of Art, the Smithsonian Museum of American Art, The National Museum of Women in the Arts, the Baltimore Museum of Art, and the White House rotating collection. She has had numerous one-woman shows and group shows in Washington DC, New York, and Madrid, Spain. Selected shows and collections include:

- Watkins Gallery, Washington D.C. 1964
- Corcoran Gallery of Art – Juried Area Show, Washington D.C.1965
- Invitational Show for Dedication of the National Bureau of Standards, Washington D.C. 1966
- Mickelson Gallery (Four person show), Washington D.C. 1967
- Cisneros Gallery, New York City, New York (solo show) 1967
- Baltimore Museum of Art, Juried Art Show – Award Winner, Baltimore, Maryland 1967
- Corcoran Gallery of Art – Juried Area Show, Washington D.C. 1967
- Museum of Modern Art, Bilbao, Spain (One Woman Show) 1969
- Smithsonian Institution, National Collection of Fine Arts,
- White House Exhibition 1970
- Mickelson Gallery – One Woman Show 1972
- Baltimore Museum of Art, Baltimore Maryland 1972
- Plum Gallery, Kensington, MD (one woman show) 1977
- National Museum of Women in The Arts, Washington, DC (permanent collection and catalog) 1986
- Accepted in Permanent Collection and Displayed in “Art in Washington DC in the 1960s” Exhibit 2016

== Reception ==
Klavan's work has been reviewed in multiple publications including Popovici, La Prensa, 1968; Washington Star, 10/26/1969; Washington Daily News, 9/13/1971; The Gallery Scene, The Evening Star, 3/13/1972; Maryland News, 3/23/1972; and the Unicorn Times 11/77.

Jo Ann Lewis wrote in The Washington Post (10/22/1977): "....The inventive Minne Klavans is showing her latest work...a series of 60-foot scrolls – some small and some huge and spectacular – all covered with brightly colored, intuited abstract signs and symbols which one "reads" by unrolling the scrolls, oriental style."
