= Cooties (disambiguation) =

Cooties is a fictional communicable disease.

Cooties may also refer to:

- Cooties (film), a 2014 American horror comedy
- Cooties, a 2022 album by Bugs
- "Cooties", a song from the 2002 musical Hairspray

== See also ==
- Cootie (disambiguation)
