= Eden Brent =

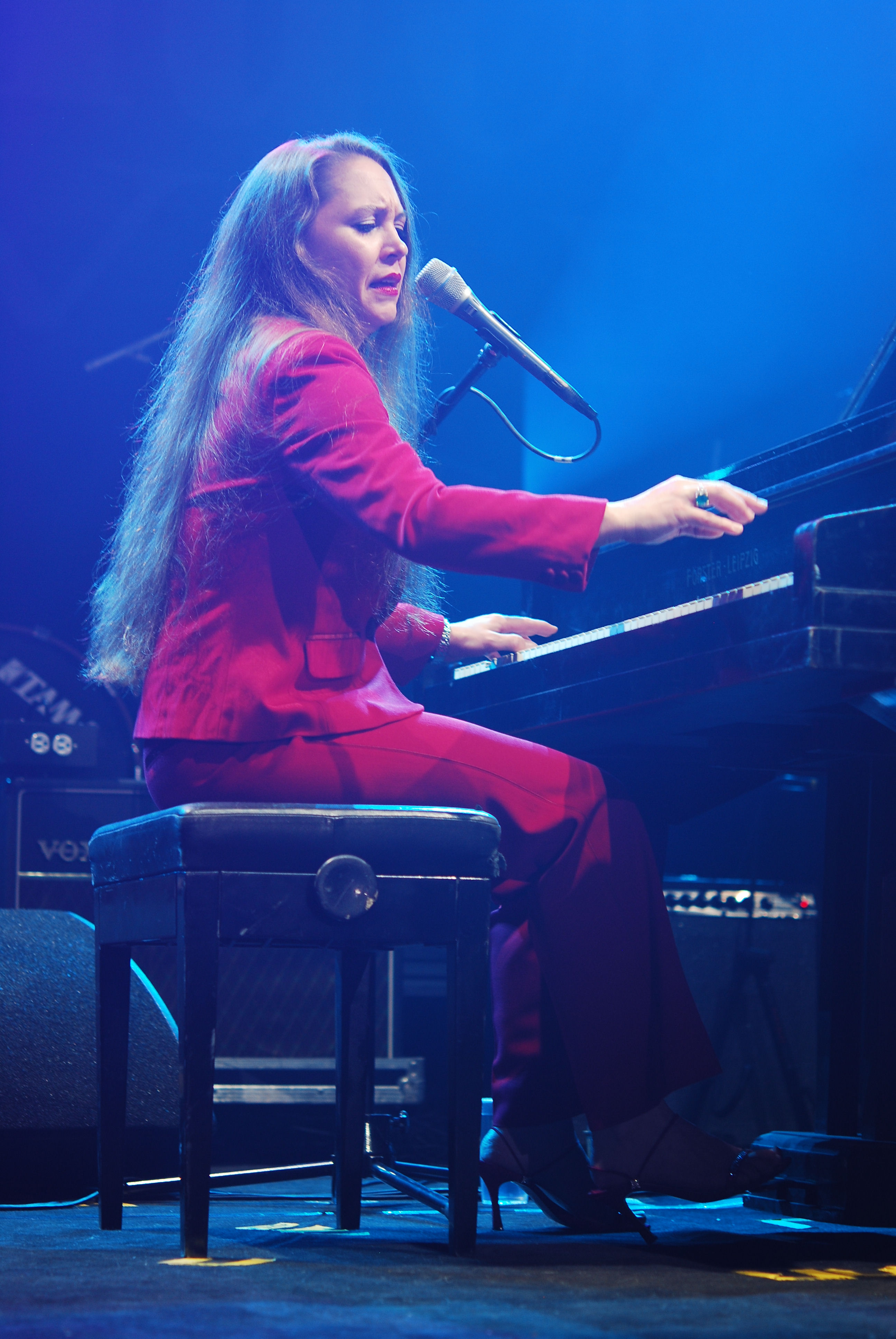
- Eden Brent performing at the Rawa Blues Festival in Poland, 2009

Background information
- Born: November 16, 1965 (age 60); Greenville, Mississippi, United States
- Genres: Blues, boogie-woogie
- Occupations: Musician
- Instruments: Piano, vocals
- Years active: 1994–present
- Label: Yellow Dog Records
- Website: edenbrent.com

Eden Brent (born November 16, 1965, in Greenville, Mississippi, United States) is an American musician on the independent Yellow Dog Records label. A blues pianist and vocalist, she combines boogie-woogie with elements of blues, jazz, soul, gospel and pop. Her vocal style has been compared to Bessie Smith, Memphis Minnie and Aretha Franklin. She took lessons from Abie "Boogaloo" Ames, a traditional blues and boogie woogie piano player and eventually earned the nickname "Little Boogaloo."

Brent won Traditional Blues Female Artist (Koko Taylor Award) at the 2026 Blues Music Awards.In 2006, she won the Blues Foundation's International Blues Challenge. Along with other awards, Brent garnered two 2009 Blues Music Awards - one for Acoustic Artist of the Year, the other for Acoustic Album of the Year (Mississippi Number One). At The 14th Annual Independent Music Awards in 2015, Eden Brent won the award in the "Holiday Song" category for "Valentine". In 2025, Brent was given the 'Pinetop Perkins Piano Player' title at the Blues Music Awards.

== History ==
Eden Brent was born in 1965 and raised in Greenville, Mississippi, where she attended Washington School. Brent studied jazz and music at the University of North Texas, graduating with a Bachelor's degree in Music.

When she was 16, Eden Brent met the late blues pioneer, Abie Ames, and began to teach herself how to play his style. Brent has said,

"By the time I was 19, I’d nearly become sort of a groupie. I’d go hear him and request certain songs because I wanted to hear them and sort of watch over his shoulder a bit and watch the way he was playing. Sometimes I’d request the same thing over and over and then go home and try to learn it. Finally, after a few failures of not being able to pick it up on my own I was bold enough to ask him to teach me."

In 1985, Ames took her under his wing for 16 years, nicknaming her Little Boogaloo. This apprenticeship advanced Brent’s talents. She was featured alongside Ames in the 1999 PBS documentary, Boogaloo & Eden: Sustaining the Sound, and in the 2002 South African production Forty Days in the Delta.

Since launching her career, Eden travels the United States and abroad performing in festivals such as Notodden, the Chicago Blues Festival, Cognac's Blues Passions, and the New Orleans Jazz & Heritage Festival. She is a frequent piano bar host aboard the Legendary Rhythm & Blues Cruise.

== Awards ==
Won

- 2009: "Acoustic Artist of The Year" by the Blues Foundation
- 2009: "Acoustic Album of Year" by the Blues Foundation
- 2010: "Pinetop Perkins Piano Player" by the Blues Foundation
- 2015: "Holiday Song" award for "Valentine" - 2015 14th Annual Independent Music Awards
- 2025: "Pinetop Perkins Piano Player" by the Blues Foundation
- 2026 "Traditional Blues Female Artist" (Koko Taylor Award) Blues Music Awards

Nominated

- 2008: "Sean Costello Rising Star Award" by the Blues Blast Music Awards
- 2008: "Blues Song Of The Year" by the Blues Critic Awards Reader's Poll for "Mississippi Number 1"
- 2009: "Blues Album of the Year" by the Just Plain Folks Music Awards for "Mississippi Number 1"
- 2009: "Blues Song of the Year" by the Just Plain Folks Music Awards for "Until I Die"
- 2009: "Best New Artist Debut" by the Blues Foundation for Mississippi Number 1
- 2009: "Pinetop Perkins Piano Player of the Year" by the Blues Foundation
- 2009: "Blues Song Of The Year" finalist at the 8th Annual Independent Music Awards for "Mississippi Flatland Blues"
- 2009: "Blues Artist of The Year" by the Living Blues Awards
- 2009: "Best New Artist Debut Recording" by the Blues Blast Music Awards
- 2009: "Best Female Artist" by the Blues Blast Music Awards
- 2009: "Sean Costello Rising Star Award" by the Blues Blast Music Awards
- 2010: "Most Outstanding Musician – Keyboard" by the Living Blues Awards
- 2011: "Blues Album, Adult Contemporary Song" for The Independent Music Awards

== Discography ==
- 2003: Something Cool (Little Boogaloo Records)
- 2008: Mississippi Number One (Yellow Dog Records)
- 2010: Ain't Got No Troubles (Yellow Dog Records)
- 2014: Jigsaw Heart (Yellow Dog Records)
- 2018: An Eden Brent Christmas (with Bob Dowell) (Yellow Dog Records)
- 2024: Getaway Blues (Yellow Dog Records)
