= She Who Weeps =

Studio album by Cassandra Wilson
- Released: June 25, 1991
- Recorded: July, October, November and December 1990
- Studios: Systems Two (Brooklyn, New York)
- Genre: Jazz
- Length: 40:14
- Labels: JMT; JMT 834 443
- Producers: Cassandra Wilson; Jean-Paul Bourelly

Cassandra Wilson chronology
Live (1991)	She Who Weeps (1991)	After the Beginning Again (1992)

She Who Weeps is the fifth studio album by American jazz singer Cassandra Wilson. It was released on June 25, 1991.

== Reception ==
Professional ratings
Review scores
Source	Rating
AllMusic	3/5 stars
The Encyclopedia of Popular Music	3/5 stars
The Guardian	3/5 stars
The Penguin Guide to Jazz on CD	3/4 stars
The Rolling Stone Jazz & Blues Album Guide	3/5 stars

Writing for AllMusic, Scott Yanow described the album as a "transition of sorts" for the artist, and noted some traces of her earlier M-Base style. Overall, he called the album "Interesting but not overly memorable". John Fordham of The Guardian stated: "This is Cassandra Wilson in 1990, two years after her powerful standards album Blue Skies, and three before she turned to the rootsy, blues-based folk-jazz she still pursues variations on today."

== Track listing ==
1. "Iconic Memories" (Cassandra Wilson) – 5:07
2. "Chelsea Bridge" (Billy Strayhorn) – 6:34
3. "Out Loud (Jeris' Blues)" (Steve Coleman, Wilson) – 4:23
4. "She Who Weeps" (Mary Fowlkes) – 3:31
5. "Angel" (Carolyn Franklin, Sonny Saunders) – 4:42
6. "Body and Soul" (Edward Heyman, Robert Sour, Frank Eyton, Johnny Green) – 10:47
7. "New African Blues" (Wilson) – 5:32

== Personnel ==
- Cassandra Wilson – vocals, drum programming (3), tambourine (4)
- Rod Williams – acoustic piano (1–3, 5–7)
- Jean-Paul Bourelly – guitars (4), guitar synthesizer (4)
- Kevin Bruce Harris – electric bass (1, 7)
- Reggie Washington – electric bass (2, 3, 5, 6)
- Herman Fowlkes – electric bass (4)
- Tani Tabbal – drums (1, 7)
- Mark Johnson – drums (2, 5, 6)

Production

- Stefan F. Winter – executive producer
- Cassandra Wilson – producer
- Jean-Paul Bourelly – producer
- Joe Marciano – engineer
- Diana Klein – artwork
- Steve Byram – cover design

Reissue

- Adrian Von Ripka – remastering
- Günter Mattei – cover design

== Chart positions ==
Year	Chart	Position
1991	Billboard Top Jazz Albums	7
