= Live (Cassandra Wilson album) =

Live album by Cassandra Wilson
- Released: May 9, 1991
- Recorded: April 18, 1991 at Amerika Haus, München
- Studio: Bauer Studios Ludwigsberg (Ludwigsberg, Germany)
- Genre: Jazz
- Length: 69:06
- Label: JMT
- Producer: Stefan F. Winter

Cassandra Wilson chronology
Jumpworld (1989)	Live (1991)	She Who Weeps (1991)

Professional ratings
Review scores
Source	Rating
Allmusic	2/5 stars
The Buffalo News	3/4 stars
Penguin Guide to Jazz on CD	3/4 stars
The Rolling Stone Jazz & Blues Album Guide	4/5 stars

Live is a jazz album by American singer Cassandra Wilson, released in 1991.

== Reception ==
The Buffalo News review by Jeff Simon wrote, "Wilson's modal version of "Body and Soul" a la Betty Carter more than makes up for it by being as inventive and powerful as any you're likely to hear from jazz's postmodern generation."

== Track listing ==
1. "Don't Look Back" (Jean-Paul Bourelly, Cassandra Wilson) – 5:55
2. "Soul Melange" (Steve Coleman, Wilson) – 11:35
3. "'Round Midnight" (Thelonious Monk, Cootie Williams, Bernie Hanighen) – 7:58
4. "My Corner of the Sky" (Wilson) – 9:43
5. "Desperate Move" (Coleman) – 12:07
6. "Body and Soul" (Edward Heyman, Robert Sour, Frank Eyton, Johnny Green) – 9:31
7. "Rock This Calling" (Coleman, Wilson) – 12:15

== Personnel ==
- Cassandra Wilson – vocals
- James Weidman – acoustic piano, synthesizers
- Kevin Bruce Harris – electric bass
- Mark Johnson – drums

=== Production ===
- Hiroshi Itsuno – executive producer
- Stefan F. Winter – producer
- Johannes Wohlleben – digital recording, digital mixing
- Paul Cameron – recording assistant
- Adrian Von Ripka – digital editing
- Steve Byram – cover design
- Sara Schwartz – illustration
- Andreas Weise –photography
- Thomas Stöwsand – tour manager

== Chart positions ==
Year	Chart	Position
1992	Billboard Top Jazz Albums	23
