= Washington School (Mississippi) =

Segregation academy in Mississippi

Location
- 1605 East Reed Road; Greenville, Mississippi; 33°23′03″N 91°1′29″W

Information
- Type: Private segregation academy
- Motto: Exitus Acta Probat
- Established: 1969
- Headmaster: Jeff Pinnow
- Secondary Principal: John Grant
- Grades: pre-kindergarten — 12
- Enrollment: 740 (approximately)
- Colors: Blue and Gold
- Mascot: The General
- Affiliation: Mississippi Association of Independent Schools, Southern Association of Independent Schools, Southern Association of Colleges and Schools
- Website: http://www.generals.ws
- Last updated: 2nd April 2024

Washington School is a private school in Greenville, Mississippi. Washington School offers pre-school, elementary, middle, and college preparatory education to Greenville and the surrounding areas. It was established as a segregation academy in response to Brown v. Board of Education.

== History ==
“One act of stupidity and we have paid for it ever since. The story of Greenville would have been very different if the school had never opened. I’ve been watching two generations of families and kids, and all the resegregation. Now every white family that can afford it sends their kids there.” Bob Boyd on the state of the school systems in Greenville 2016, Delta Democrat Times.

The school was established as a segregation academy in response to the racial integration of the local public schools in 1969, with its first classes beginning in September 1970. In 1971, the school joined the Mississippi Private Schools Association, which had been created to help segregation academies organize school athletics and file legal documents to qualify for tax-deductible status with the IRS.

In its first year, Washington School had a total of 23 staff members and 323 students. Classes were originally held in the current elementary building. Enrollment in 2016 was 700 students with the average size of a graduating class being around 60 students. As of 2016, the school's students are 98% Caucasian, but Washington County is over 72% African American and the Greenville metro area is over 85% African American .

== Notable alumni ==
Eden Brent, musician
