= Ray Roberts (baseball) =

American baseball player (1895-1962)

- Pitcher
- Born: August 25, 1895; Cruger, Mississippi, U.S.
- Died: January 30, 1962 (aged 66); Cruger, Mississippi, U.S.
- Batted: Left Threw: Right

MLB debut
- September 12, 1919, for the Philadelphia Athletics

Last MLB appearance
- September 26, 1919, for the Philadelphia Athletics

MLB statistics
- Win–loss record: 0–2
- Earned run average: 7.71
- Strikeouts: 2
- Stats at Baseball Reference

Teams
- Philadelphia Athletics (1919)

Raymond Roberts (August 25, 1895 – January 30, 1962) was an American Major League Baseball pitcher who appeared in three games in Major League Baseball for the 1919 Philadelphia Athletics. After attending Mississippi State University and serving in World War I, he started his eleven-year professional baseball career with the Atlanta Crackers earlier in 1919. He was born and died in Cruger, Mississippi.

Roberts batted left and threw right-handed, stood 5 feet 11 inches (1.80 m) tall and weighed 180 pounds (82 kg). In his brief tenure with Philadelphia, he started two games and relieved in a third. His two starts resulted in his two decisions, both defeats; one came against the Cleveland Indians at Shibe Park on September 16, the other against the New York Yankees at the Polo Grounds September 26.

In his three games and 14 innings pitched, Roberts allowed 14 runs, 12 earned, on 21 hits and three bases on balls. He fanned two and posted an earned run average of 7.71.
