= Lekan Babalola =

Nigerian jazz percussionist and musician

- Born: Olalekan Babalola; 15 May 1960 (age 66); Lagos, British Nigeria
- Education: Chelsea College of Aeronautical and Automobile Engineering; Saint Martin's School of Art
- Spouse: Kate Luxmoore
- Children: 5
- Musical career
- Genres: Afrobeat, jazz
- Occupations: musician, percussionist
- Instruments: Vocals, conga, Bongo drum
- Years active: 1983–present

Olalekan Babalola (born c. 1960) is a Nigerian jazz percussionist and musician. Born in Lagos, Nigeria where he began playing the conga at a young age, he has released seven albums and jointly won two Grammy Awards.

== Early life and education ==
Babalola was born in Lagos State, South-Western Nigeria where he attended Bishop Oluwole Primary School, Agege for his basic education before proceeding to Iwo in the old Oyo State for his secondary school education. At the age of six, he had started playing the conga at his father's Aladura church and later formed a patchwork band with his peers.

In 1980, he left Nigeria for the United Kingdom to study automobile engineering at the Chelsea College of Aeronautical and Automobile Engineering after he won a Lagos State Scholarship. Babalola however dropped the engineering programme for music and later enrolled at the Central Saint Martin's College of Art and Design where he studied filmmaking. He proceeded to the Northern Film School where he completed his master's degree.

== Career ==
He began his professional career after joining a band called Samba Samba Band and later New York City-based Art Blakey's Jazz Messengers band, where he perfected playing the Bongo drums and performing jazz music. Upon his return to the U.K, Babalola later went on to work with notable acts including Prince, Ernest Ranglin, Branford Marsalis, African Jazz All Stars, Roy Ayers, David Byrne, Damon Albarn, Tony Allen amongst others. In 2006, he became Nigeria's first Grammy Award winner for his work on Ali Farka Touré's In the Heart of the Moon which he was credited in three tracks. He also won a second Grammy in 2009 for his work on Cassandra Wilson's 2008 album titled Loverly.
