= Traveling Miles =

Studio album (Tribute album) by Cassandra Wilson
- Released: March 23, 1999
- Recorded: December 1997, May & September 1998
- Studios: The Hit Factory (New York City, New York); Bearsville Studios (Bearsville, New York)
- Genre: Jazz
- Length: 62:21
- Label: Blue Note
- Producer: Cassandra Wilson

Cassandra Wilson chronology
Rendezvous (1997)	Traveling Miles (1999)	Belly of the Sun (2002)

Professional ratings
Review scores
Source	Rating
All About Jazz	(favorable)
Allmusic	2.5/5 stars
The Austin Chronicle	2/5 stars
The Buffalo News	3/4 stars
laut.de	4/5 stars
Penguin Guide to Jazz	3.5/4 stars
Robert Christgau	:)
Rolling Stone	3.5/5 stars
Tom Hull	B+
Q	3/5 stars

Traveling Miles is the thirteenth studio album by American jazz vocalist Cassandra Wilson, released on the Blue Note label in 1999.

The album is a tribute to influential trumpeter Miles Davis, and features songs written or performed by Davis, along with material written for the album and new lyrics for older songs which were originally instrumentals. Traveling Miles was nominated for the Grammy Award as Best Jazz Vocal Performance.

== Reception ==
Jeff Simon of The Buffalo News wrote, "Cassandra Wilson is, paradoxically, very much her own woman at the same time that she may be overly in thrall to her friends. The results are bound to be some discs where her extraordinary gifts fail to connect as they should. "Travelling Miles" is one of them. It's never less than interesting but seldom more than that." A reviewer of Dusty Groove stated: "Cassandra Wilson's tribute to Miles Davis – a pretty brave and ambitious move, writing lyrics to classic Miles compositions – and a winning one! Wilson produced the record, too, and her genuine love of the material makes it worth – as does her fairly earthy, timeless production. Made in the late 90s, and it honestly hasn't aged a day. Very impressive!" Scott Yanow of AllMusic wrote: "A tribute album by Cassandra Wilson to Miles Davis seems like a very logical idea, but this CD is actually less than one would expect... her interpretations smooth down most of the melodies, robbing them of their personality."

== Track listing ==
1. "Run the Voodoo Down" (Miles Davis, Cassandra Wilson) – 4:36 *
2. "Traveling Miles" (Wilson) – 4:52
3. "Right Here Right Now" (Marvin Sewell, Wilson) – 5:57
4. "Time After Time" (Rob Hyman, Cyndi Lauper) – 4:08
5. "When the Sun Goes Down" (Wilson) – 6:05
6. "Seven Steps" (Victor Feldman, Davis) – 6:44 *
7. "Someday My Prince Will Come" (Frank Churchill, Larry Morey) – 3:53
8. "Never Broken (ESP)" (Wayne Shorter, Wilson) – 5:13 *
9. "Resurrection Blues (Tutu)" (Marcus Miller, Wilson) – 6:11 *
10. "Sky & Sea (Blue in Green)" (Davis, Wilson) – 5:24 *
11. "Piper" (Wilson) – 5:03
12. "Voodoo Reprise" (Davis, Wilson, Angelique Kidjo) – 4:15

Japanese Bonus Track

13. "Prancing" (Davis, Wilson) – 6:24

* Links for these tracks are to original Miles Davis recordings, from which Wilson's recordings adapt and take inspiration.

== Personnel ==
- Cassandra Wilson – vocals, left acoustic guitar (5, 11)
- Eric Lewis – acoustic piano (1, 6, 10, 12)
- Kevin Breit – electric guitar (1, 12), electric EBow guitar (4), bouzouki (4), electric mandolin (7), resophonic guitar (8), mandocello (8), acoustic guitar (10), mandolin (10)
- Marvin Sewell – electric guitar (1, 5, 9, 12), classical guitar (2, 8, 11), right acoustic guitar (3, 5), acoustic guitar (4, 7, 8), bouzouki (11)
- Doug Wamble – acoustic guitar (2, 9), left acoustic guitar (3)
- Pat Metheny – classical guitar (10)
- Dave Holland – acoustic bass (1, 10, 12)
- Lonnie Plaxico – acoustic bass (2–9)
- Marcus Baylor – drums (1, 6, 7, 12), percussion (6)
- Perry Wilson – drums (2, 3, 9)
- Jeff Haynes – percussion (1, 3–5, 7, 8, 10, 12)
- Mino Cinelu – percussion (2)
- Cecilia Smith – marimba (3, 9)
- Stefon Harris – vibraphone (6, 8)
- Olu Dara – cornet (1, 12)
- Steve Coleman – alto saxophone (2)
- Vincent Henry – harmonica (5)
- Regina Carter – violin (6–8)
- Angelique Kidjo – vocals (12)

== Production ==
- Cassandra Wilson – producer
- Ed Gerrard – associate producer
- Ray Bardani – recording, mixing
- Danny Kopelson – recording
- Scott Gormley – recording assistant, mix assistant
- Jacob Holland – recording assistant
- Doug Wynne – recording assistant
- Ian Dalsemer – recording assistant (2, 3, 9)
- Rob Murphy – mix assistant
- Damien Shannon – mix assistant
- Greg Calbi – mastering at Sterling Sound (New York, NY)
- Alexa Birdsong – production coordinator
- Gordon H. Jee – art direction
- Greenberg Kingsley – design
- Lisa Bowman – inside cover collage
- Joanne Savio – photography
- Tracy Carpino – stylist, Miles Davis concept
- Donyale McRae – make-up
- Dream Street Management – management

== Charts ==
Chart (1999)	Peak position
US Billboard 200	158
US Top Jazz Albums (Billboard)	1
US Heatseekers (Billboard)	5
