= Days Aweigh =

Studio album by Cassandra Wilson
- Released: 1987
- Recorded: May 1987
- Studio: Systems Two (Brooklyn, New York)
- Genre: Jazz
- Length: 51:58
- Label: JMT JMT 870012
- Producer: Stefan F. Winter; Steve Coleman; Cassandra Wilson

Cassandra Wilson chronology
Point of View (1986)	Days Aweigh (1987)	Blue Skies (1988)

Days Aweigh is the second studio album by American jazz singer Cassandra Wilson. It was originally released on the JMT label in 1987 and later rereleased on Winter & Winter.

== Reception ==
Professional ratings
Review scores
Source	Rating
AllMusic	3/5 stars
The Encyclopedia of Popular Music	3/5 stars
The Penguin Guide to Jazz on CD	2.5/4 stars
The Virgin Encyclopedia of Eighties Music	3/5 stars

AllMusic's Scott Yanow stated that "this is advanced free funk dance music."

== Track listing ==
All tracks composed by Cassandra Wilson; except where indicated

1. "Electromagnolia" (Olu Dara, Cassandra Wilson) – 4:45
2. "Let's Face the Music and Dance" (Irving Berlin) – 2:31
3. "Days Aweigh" (Jean-Paul Bourelly) – 3:27
4. "Subatomic Blues" – 4:34
5. "Apricots on Their Wings" (Henry Threadgill) – 5:49
6. "If You Only Know How" – 5:07
7. "You Belong to You" – 4:55
8. "Some Other Time" (Leonard Bernstein, Betty Comden, Adolph Green) – 5:12
9. "Black and Yellow" (Rod Williams) – 5:38

== Personnel ==
- Cassandra Wilson – vocals, arrangements (4, 6, 7)
- Rod Williams – synthesizers (1, 3, 6, 9), acoustic piano (2, 4–9), arrangements (9)
- Jean-Paul Bourelly – electric guitar (1, 3), arrangements (3)
- Kevin Bruce Harris – electric bass (1, 3, 5, 9)
- Kenny Davis – acoustic bass (2, 4, 6, 7)
- Mark Johnson – drums (1–7, 9)
- Steve Coleman – alto saxophone (4, 7)
- Olu Dara – cornet (1), vocals (1), arrangements (1)
- Graham Haynes – trumpet (2, 3, 5–7, 9)
- Henry Threadgill – arrangements (5, 6)

Production

- Stefan F. Winter – executive producer, producer
- Steve Coleman – co-producer
- Cassandra Wilson – co-producer
- Joe Marciano – engineer
- Joseph Gallus Rittenberg – photography, cover design
- Jean-Paul Bourelly – liner notes

Reissue

- Adrian Von Ripka – remastering
- Günter Mattei – cover design
