= Cruger, Mississippi =

- Town
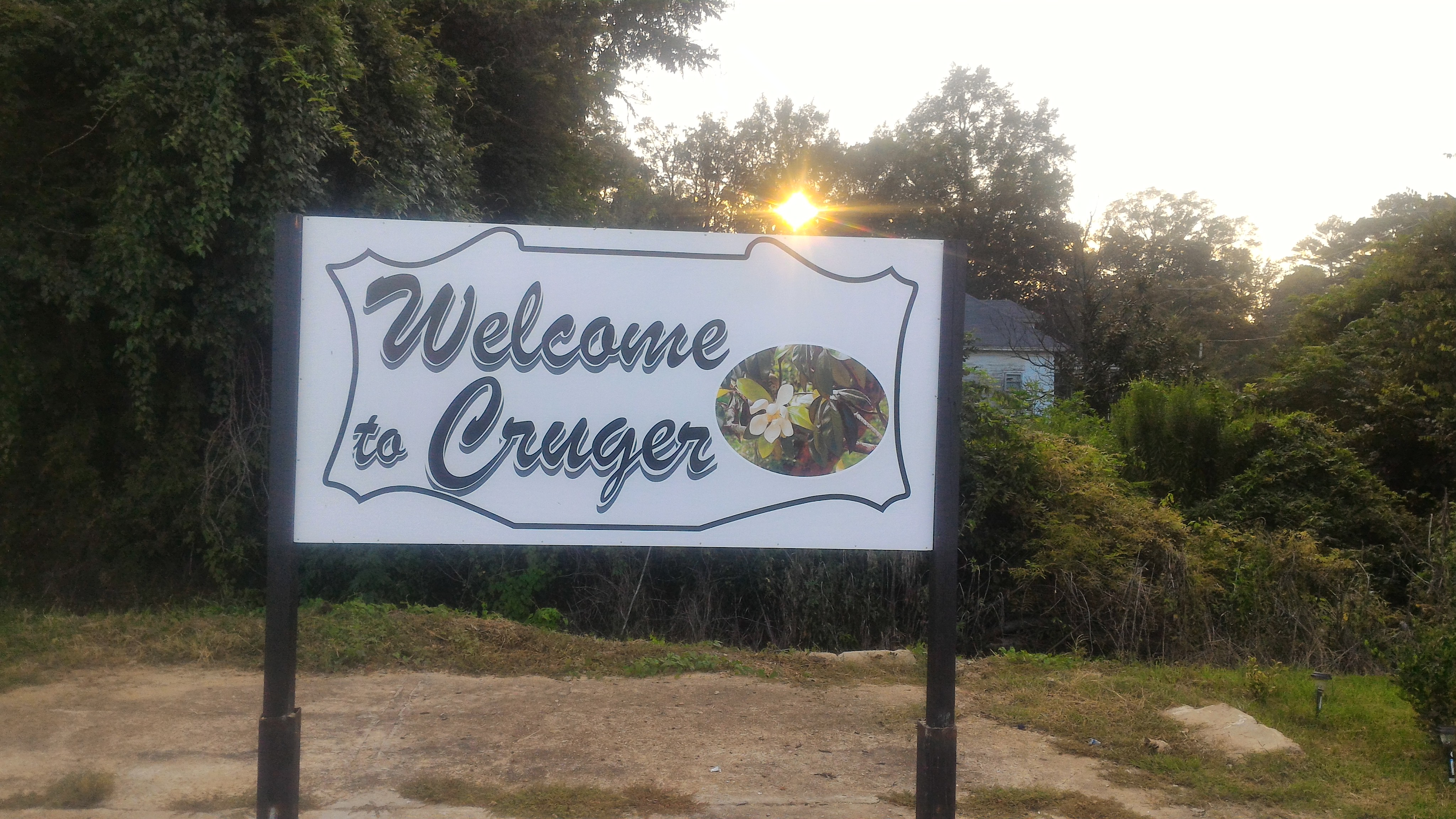
- Welcome Sign in Cruger

- Location of Cruger, Mississippi

- Location in the United States
- Coordinates: 33°19′15″N 90°14′6″W
- Country: United States
- State: Mississippi
- County: Holmes

Government
  - Mayor: Mary L. Ajoku

Area
  - Total: 0.97 sq mi (2.50 km^{2})
  - Land: 0.97 sq mi (2.50 km^{2})
  - Water: 0 sq mi (0.00 km^{2})
- Elevation: 115 ft (35 m)

Population (2020)
  - Total: 268
  - Density: 277.9/sq mi (107.31/km^{2})
- Time zone: UTC-6 (Central (CST))
  - Summer (DST): UTC-5 (CDT)
- ZIP code: 38924
- Area code: 662
- FIPS code: 28-16980
- GNIS feature ID: 0668992

Cruger is a town in Holmes County, Mississippi, United States. Per the 2020 census, the population was 268.

== Geography ==
Cruger is in the northwest corner of Holmes County, in the Mississippi Delta region along U.S. Route 49E. Greenwood is 15 miles (24 km) north of Cruger via US 49E, and Yazoo City is 37 miles (60 km) to the south.

According to the United States Census Bureau, Cruger has a total area of 0.97 square miles (2.5 km^{2}), all land.

== Demographics ==
Historical population
Census	Pop.	Note	%±
1910	231		—
1920	488		111.3%
1930	409		−16.2%
1940	450		10.0%
1950	494		9.8%
1960	362		−26.7%
1970	415		14.6%
1980	540		30.1%
1990	548		1.5%
2000	449		−18.1%
2010	386		−14.0%
2020	268		−30.6%
U.S. Decennial Census; 2010 2020

=== Racial and ethnic composition ===
Cruger town, Mississippi – Racial and ethnic composition Note: the US Census treats Hispanic/Latino as an ethnic category. This table excludes Latinos from the racial categories and assigns them to a separate category. Hispanics/Latinos may be of any race.
Race / Ethnicity (NH = Non-Hispanic)	Pop 2000	Pop 2010	Pop 2020	% 2000	% 2010	% 2020
White alone (NH)	110	55	53	24.50%	14.25%	19.78%
Black or African American alone (NH)	329	327	205	73.27%	84.72%	76.49%
Native American or Alaska Native alone (NH)	0	0	1	0.00%	0.00%	0.37%
Asian alone (NH)	0	2	0	0.00%	0.52%	0.00%
Native Hawaiian or Pacific Islander alone (NH)	0	0	0	0.00%	0.00%	0.00%
Other race alone (NH)	0	0	0	0.00%	0.00%	0.00%
Mixed race or Multiracial (NH)	0	0	1	0.00%	0.00%	0.37%
Hispanic or Latino (any race)	10	2	8	2.23%	0.52%	2.99%
Total	449	386	268	100.00%	100.00%	100.00%

=== 2000 Census ===
As of the census of 2000, there were 449 people, 161 households, and 112 families residing in the town. The population density was 462.5 inhabitants per square mile (178.6/km^{2}). There were 177 housing units at an average density of 182.3 per square mile (70.4/km^{2}). The racial makeup of the town was 74.16% African American 25.61% White and 0.22% Asian. Hispanic or Latino of any race were 2.23% of the population.

There were 161 households, out of which 33.5% had children under the age of 18 living with them, 32.3% were married couples living together, 30.4% had a female householder with no husband present, and 30.4% were non-families. 29.8% of all households were made up of individuals, and 16.1% had someone living alone who was 65 years of age or older. The average household size was 2.79 and the average family size was 3.46.

In the town, the population was spread out, with 32.1% under the age of 18, 10.0% from 18 to 24, 25.8% from 25 to 44, 15.1% from 45 to 64, and 16.9% who were 65 years of age or older. The median age was 32 years. For every 100 females, there were 89.5 males. For every 100 females age 18 and over, there were 77.3 males.

The median income for a household in the town was $15,417, and the median income for a family was $27,500. Males had a median income of $24,375 versus $22,813 for females. The per capita income for the town was $14,125. About 32.8% of families and 44.7% of the population were below the poverty line, including 50.7% of those under age 18 and 58.0% of those age 65 or over.

== Transportation ==
Amtrak’s City of New Orleans, which operates between New Orleans and Chicago, passes through the town on CN tracks, but makes no stop. The nearest station is located in Greenwood, 15 miles (24 km) to the north.

== Education ==
The town of Cruger is served by the Holmes County School District.

== Notable people ==
- Abie Ames, blues and jazz pianist
- Ray Roberts, former Major League Baseball pitcher
- Robert Curtis Smith, Piedmont blues singer, guitarist and songwriter
