= I'm Old Fashioned =

1942 song by Jerome Kern and Johnny Mercer

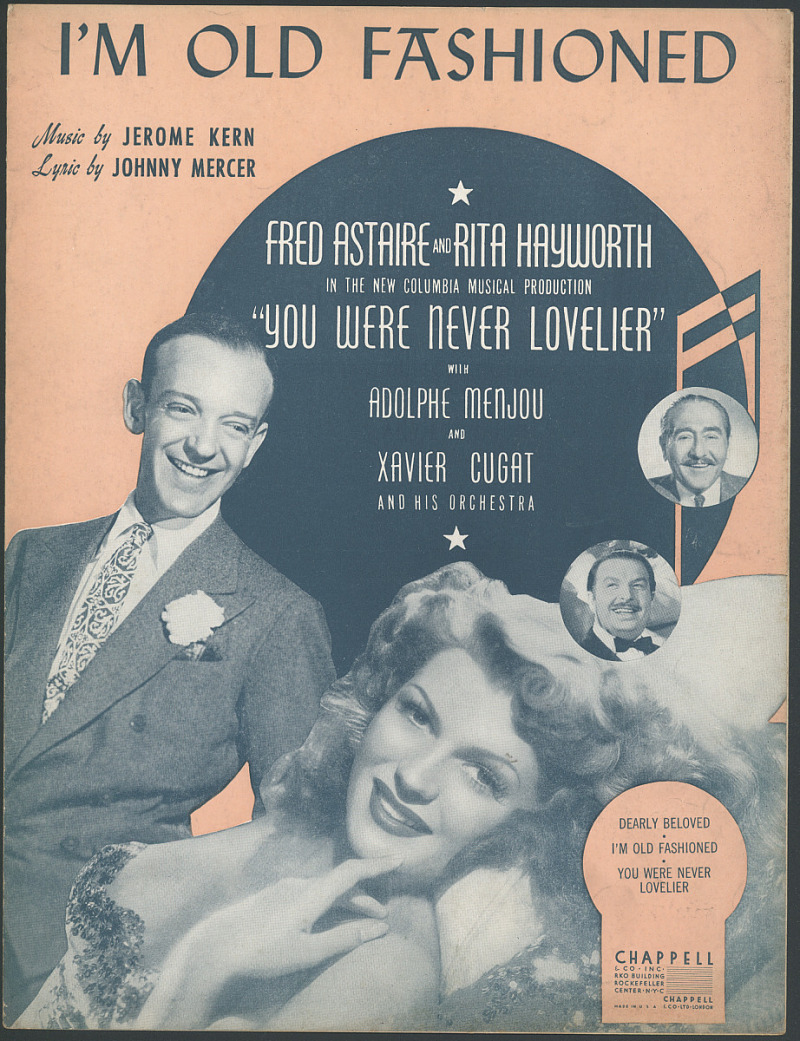
Sheet music cover for the song "I'm Old Fashioned" from the 1942 film You Were Never Lovelier, starring Fred Astaire, Rita Hayworth, and featuring Xavier Cugat.

"I'm Old Fashioned" is a 1942 song composed by Jerome Kern, with lyrics written by Johnny Mercer.

It was written for the film You Were Never Lovelier (1942), where it was introduced by Nan Wynn who dubbed for Rita Hayworth as part of a song and dance routine with Fred Astaire. The musical director of the film was Leigh Harline and that and the other romantic dance sequences were orchestrated by Conrad Salinger while he was freelancing.

== Background ==
According to John Mueller: "Constructed sparsely in a kind of theme and variations form (ABA'A") it is particularly notable for the appealing way the strains link up – especially for the poised and dramatic transitions between the A' and A" strains".

Mercer recalled working with the older Kern, and how Kern reacted to the lyrics for "I'm Old Fashioned":

We hit it off right away. I was in such awe of him, I think he must have sensed that. He was very kind to me, treated me more like a son than a collaborator. And when he thought I had a great lyric he said, "Eva, Eva, come down here", and he kissed me on the cheek and he said, "Eva, I want you to hear this lyric". Well, of course I was thrilled that he liked it that much, you know. "I'm Old Fashioned", that one was.

== First recordings ==
The first recording was made in 1942 by Astaire with John Scott Trotter and his orchestra (Decca 18490).

== Other notable recordings ==
- Julie Andrews
- Chet Baker recorded the song several times, first in 1958 on the album (Chet Baker Sings) It Could Happen to You
- John Coltrane – in 1957 for his album Blue Train
- Paul Desmond – Pure Desmond (1975)
- Eileen Farrell – I've Got a Right to Sing the Blues (1960)
- Ella Fitzgerald – Ella Fitzgerald Sings the Jerome Kern Songbook (1963)
- Judy Garland – Judy (1956)
- Dinah Shore – Dinah, Yes Indeed! (1959)
- Cassandra Wilson – Blue Skies (1988)
- The song has been interpreted by pianists like: George Shearing, Oscar Peterson, Dave Brubeck, Jimmy Rowles, Al Haig, Ahmad Jamal, Phineas Newborn Jr., Hank Jones, Tommy Flanagan, Kenny Drew, Marian McPartland, Cedar Walton, McCoy Tyner, Joanne Brackeen, and Brad Mehldau.

== Popular culture ==
This song was chosen by Jerome Robbins as the centerpiece to his ballet of the same name, created by him for the New York City Ballet in 1983, as a tribute to Astaire. Part of the original film sequence was projected above the corps de ballet.

On the British TV series Are You Being Served, Mrs. Slocombe hums and sings this song in the episode The Apartment (1979).

It was also sung by Dianne Wiest in Woody Allen’s Hannah and Her Sisters (1986).
