= Robert Curtis Smith =

American singer (1930–2010)

- Also known as: R. C. Smith
- Born: February 17, 1930; Cruger, Holmes County, Mississippi, United States
- Died: November 10, 2010 (aged 80) Chicago, Illinois, United States
- Genres: Piedmont blues
- Occupations: singer, guitarist, songwriter
- Instruments: vocals, guitar
- Years active: 1960s
- Label: Bluesville Records

Robert Curtis Smith (February 17, 1930 – November 10, 2010) was a Piedmont blues singer, guitarist and songwriter from Cruger, Mississippi, US.

Smith was influenced by Big Bill Broonzy. He recorded one album, for Bluesville Records, released in 1963.

== Biography ==
Smith was born in or near Cruger, Holmes County, Mississippi, United States, and was African-American. He worked as a farm labourer, where he and his wife raised eight children. He first played the blues guitar in 1948. He left Mississippi twice in hope of finding alternative employment in either Chicago or Texas, but each time he returned to his home state.

In 1960, by chance, he met Paul Oliver and Chris Strachwitz in Wade Walton's Big Six barber shop in Clarksdale, Mississippi. This led him to record some tracks that year and again in 1961, with the resulting album, Clarksdale Blues: The Blues of Robert Curtis Smith, released in 1963. One of his songs, "Council Spur Blues", made direct references to the conditions on the plantation where he worked.

In 1968, he left Mississippi again for Chicago, where he spent the remainder of his life. Around this time he auditioned for a place in Willie Dixon's backing band. He later joined the church and played gospel music instead of the blues. Walton eventually tracked him down, and in 1997 Smith appeared at the Sunflower River Blues & Gospel Festival in Clarksdale, playing only gospel songs.

== Death ==
Smith died in Chicago in November 2010, aged 80.

== Discography ==
=== Album ===
Year	Title	Record label
1963	Clarksdale Blues: The Blues of Robert Curtis Smith	Bluesville Records

=== Single ===
Year	Title	Record label
1961	"Don't Drive Me Away"	Arhoolie Records

== See also ==
- List of Piedmont blues musicians
