= Closer to You: The Pop Side =

Compilation album by Cassandra Wilson
- Released: April 7, 2009
- Genre: Pop
- Length: 57:50
- Label: Blue Note
- Producer: Cassandra Wilson

Cassandra Wilson chronology
Loverly (2008)	Closer to You: The Pop Side (2009)

Professional ratings
Review scores
Source	Rating
Allmusic	3.5/5 stars
All About Jazz	(favorable)
The Buffalo News	3.5/4 stars
PopMatters	7/10

Closer to You: The Pop Side is a compilation album by American jazz singer Cassandra Wilson, released in 2009.

== Reception ==
Jeff Simon of The Buffalo News stated, "Bless her, Cassandra Wilson has always done this. Even when she was the Queen of Brooklyn's thorny M-Base jazz radicals a couple decades ago -- and not yet the greatest living jazz singer as she is now -- her discs would have one or two pop hits on them, interpreted in the most inimitable way... Call it ultra-smart marketing if you want but there's a lot of marvelous music here."

== Track listing ==
1. "Love Is Blindness" (Bono, Adam Clayton, The Edge, Larry Mullen Jr.) – 4:54
2. "Time After Time" (Rob Hyman, Cyndi Lauper) – 4:07
3. "Fragile" (Sting) – 4:36
4. "Closer to You" (Jakob Dylan) – 5:48
5. "Last Train to Clarksville" (Tommy Boyce, Bobby Hart) – 5:16
6. "The Weight" (Robbie Robertson) – 6:05
7. "Tupelo Honey" (Van Morrison) – 5:37
8. "Harvest Moon" (Neil Young) – 5:02
9. "I Can't Stand the Rain" (Don Bryant, Bernard Miller, Ann Peebles) – 5:28
10. "Lay Lady Lay" (Bob Dylan) – 5:08
11. "Wichita Lineman" (Jimmy Webb) – 5:49

== Chart performance ==
Chart (2009)	Peak position
US Jazz Albums (Billboard)	12
