= Blue Skies (Cassandra Wilson album) =

Studio album by Cassandra Wilson
- Released: February 1988
- Recorded: February 1988
- Studio: A&R Recording Studios (New York City, New York)
- Genre: Vocal jazz
- Length: 43:30
- Label: JMT; JMT 834 419
- Producer: Stefan F. Winter

Cassandra Wilson chronology
| Days Aweigh (1987) | Blue Skies (1988) | Jumpworld (1990) |

Blue Skies is the third studio album by American jazz singer Cassandra Wilson. It was released on the JMT label in 1988 and features Wilson performing ten jazz standards accompanied by Mulgrew Miller on piano, Terri Lyne Carrington on drums, and Lonnie Plaxico on bass.

== Background ==
The album is named after the Irving Berlin's 1926 song and includes 10 renderings of famous jazz standards. Wilson explained: "I enjoy doing standards, and I did the album as a special project. However, that is not my direction in fact. I think it's important for us to develop new standards and to recreate the music of today inside of a new context. This is a different time and somebody's going to do that."

== Reception ==
Professional ratings
Review scores
| Source | Rating |
|---|---|
| AllMusic | 3/5 stars |
| The Encyclopedia of Popular Music | 4/5 stars |
| Hi-Fi News & Record Review | A*:2 |
| Tom Hull | B+ |
| The Penguin Guide to Jazz on CD | 3.5/4 stars |
| The Rolling Stone Jazz & Blues Album Guide | 2/5 stars |

In a review for Allmusic, Thom Jurek gave the album three stars out of five and noted that it was evidence of Wilson's move away from the M-Base style of her previous albums. He said that the album was "Not a masterpiece, but a really compelling first experiment with the more intimate forms and smaller groups Wilson would employ later on." He praised her versions of "I Didn't Know What Time It Was" and "Sweet Lorraine".

== Track listing ==
1. "Shall We Dance?" (Rodgers and Hammerstein) – 7:21
2. "Polka Dots and Moonbeams" (Johnny Burke, Jimmy Van Heusen) – 5:46
3. "I've Grown Accustomed to His Face" (Lerner and Loewe) – 5:15
4. "I Didn't Know What Time It Was" (Rodgers and Hart) – 4:51
5. "Gee Baby, Ain't I Good to You" (Andy Razaf, Don Redman) – 5:04
6. "I'm Old Fashioned" (Jerome Kern, Johnny Mercer) – 3:07
7. "Sweet Lorraine" (Cliff Burwell, Mitchell Parish) – 5:31
8. "My One and Only Love" (Robert Mellin, Guy Wood) – 6:02
9. "Autumn Nocturne" (Kim Gannon, Josef Myrow) – 5:01
10. "Blue Skies" (Irving Berlin) – 3:07

== Personnel ==
Band

- Cassandra Wilson – vocals
- Mulgrew Miller – acoustic piano
- Lonnie Plaxico – acoustic bass
- Terri Lyne Carrington – drums

Production

- Hiroshi Itsuno – executive producer
- Stefan F. Winter – producer
- Joe Ferla – engineer
- Angela Gomez – assistant engineer
- Steve Byram – cover design
- La Marr Thompson – cover photography
- Annie Watson – wardrobe
- Brett Lewis – jewelry

Reissue

- Adrian von Ripka – remastering
- Günter Mattei – cover design

== Chart positions ==
| Year | Chart | Position |
|---|---|---|
| 1988 | Billboard Top Jazz Albums | 2 |
