= Sahara Smith =

American singer-songwriter (born 1988)

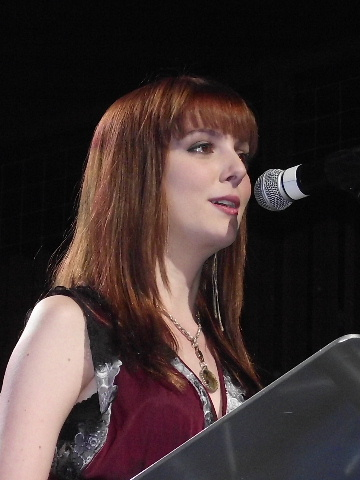
- Austin Music Awards (2011)

Background information
- Born: September 26, 1988 (age 38)
- Origin: Austin, Texas, United States
- Genres: Folk rock, alternative
- Years active: 2006–2013
- Label: Playing In Traffic
- Website: saharasmith.net

Sahara Smith (born September 26, 1988) is an American singer-songwriter who released her debut album in 2010.

== Early life ==
Sahara (her father hiccuped while suggesting "Sara," and both parties liked the mistake) Smith was born in Austin, Texas and spent her youth in Wimberley, Texas. She began writing poetry at age 3, with a poem published in the "Anthology of Poetry for Young Americans" while in the second grade, music at age twelve and at age fifteen took second place in A Prairie Home Companion's 'Talent from 12-20' contest on May 8, 2004, performing "It Don't Rain Much" and "Twilight Red". A studio recording of "Twilight Red" would be included on her debut album.

== Career ==
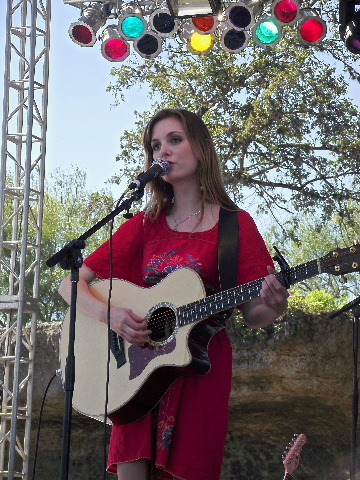
Smith on stage in 2010.

Producer T-Bone Burnett noticed Smith and took her into the studio to record her debut album, Myth of the Heart, which was released in 2010 and described as a "hybrid of folk, Americana, country and bluegrass". Smith appeared on the Late Show with David Letterman in November 2010. Smith says her musical influences include Leonard Cohen and Tom Waits.

In 2006 an Austin Chronicle music reporter said: "Her musical sophistication and the uncanny maturity of her lyrics astonished me" and she is "the most gifted young performer I've seen in 26 years." A Seventeen article described her as a "striking, lanky redhead [who] exudes confidence and grace" and described her vocals as "a mixture of the soulful folk melodies of Jewel with the soothing vocals of Norah Jones”.

A Los Angeles Times music reviewer said "Smith creates Cinemascope-like wide-screen portraits of romantic passion, loneliness and unrequited love in her richly impressive, intensely soulful debut album." Other reviewers mention her "smoky voice, bluesy folk sound" that "invokes lazy summer nights and sweaty slow dancing".

In June 2013 she rebranded herself as "Girl Pilot" and is working on a new 10-song album. "The name Girl Pilot comes from a book of comics from the 1940s called "Smilin' Jack and the Daredevil Girl Pilot" that I've had since I was 13. I've carried that name around with me for years, and because my new album is so different from the last, and so indicative of who I am now, this feels like the perfect moment to use it. I've never been so excited to do what I do, or felt so eager to take control of my life and my career. Girl Pilot feels somehow correct."

== Discography ==
=== Studio albums ===
Year	Album details	Peak chart positions				Certifications (sales threshold)
Year	Album details	US	US Rock	US Heat	US Indie	Certifications (sales threshold)
2010	Myth Of The Heart: Released: 2010; Label: Playing In Traffic Records	-	-	-	-	

=== Music videos ===
Year	Video	Director
2010	"The Real Thing"	Rosalyn Rosen
2010	"Thousand Secrets"	Rosalyn Rosen
