= List of jazz percussionists =

This is an alphabetized list of notable musicians who play or played percussion, excluding keyboard percussion. Only add names here if the person has their own article on Wikipedia, please.

== A ==
- Alex Acuña
- Don Alias

== B ==
- Lekan Babalola
- Cyro Baptista
- Ray Barretto
- Steve Berrios
- Anthony Brown

== C ==
- Buck Clarke
- Candido Camero
- Lenny Castro
- Mino Cinelu
- Paulinho da Costa

== D ==
- Rubem Dantas
- Roger Dawson
- Xavier Desandre Navarre

== F ==
- Sammy Figueroa
- David Friedman

== G ==
- Sameer Gupta
- Trilok Gurtu

== H ==
- Giovanni Hidalgo
- Zakir Hussain

== J ==
- Kevin Jones

== M ==
- Airto Moreira
- Jamie Muir

== N ==
- Andy Narell

== P ==
- Armando Peraza
- Chano Pozo
- Tito Puente

== R ==
- Badal Roy

== S ==
- Poncho Sánchez
- Mongo Santamaría
- Arturo Stable

== T ==
- Okay Temiz
- Robert Thomas, Jr.
- Arto Tunçboyacıyan

== V ==
- Tony Vacca
- Carlos "Patato" Valdes
