= Glamoured =

Studio album by Cassandra Wilson
- Released: October 7, 2003
- Recorded: December 2002 – March 2003
- Studios: The Sonic Temple (Jackson, Mississippi); Avatar Studios and Breezy's Lab (New York City, New York)
- Genre: Jazz
- Length: 53:25
- Label: Blue Note
- Producers: Cassandra Wilson; Fabrizio Sotti

Cassandra Wilson chronology
Sings Standards (2002)	Glamoured (2003)	Thunderbird (2006)

Professional ratings
Review scores
Source	Rating
AllMusic	4/5 stars
All About Jazz	(favorable)
The Buffalo News	3.5/4 stars
Entertainment Weekly	(A−)
JazzTimes	(favorable)
laut.de	3/5 stars
The Penguin Guide to Jazz	3/4 stars
Rhapsody	(favorable)
Vibe	4/5 stars

Glamoured is a studio album by American jazz singer Cassandra Wilson. The record was released on the Blue Note label in 2003.

== Reception ==
Thom Jurek of AllMusic wrote: "On Glamoured, Wilson composed half the album, and her songs are as provocative and deserve the same weight of grace critically afforded her covers. She uses her trademark fluid, smoky delivery to redefine songs such as the old soul nugget 'If Loving You Is Wrong'; the poignancy it was written with tells of a woman lost in the delirium of a forbidden love with a married man. The ache and euphoria in her voice shot through with producer Fabrizio Sotti's stunning acoustic guitar interplay is nearly overwhelming in its emotion." Nick Dedina of Napster commented: "The name of this album refers to those under a spell, which is exactly the effect of this hypnotizing mix of jazz, blues and folk. Recording again in her native Mississippi, Wilson works her magic over interwoven guitars and tribal drums on vivid originals and covers, including a ribald take on Bob Dylan's 'Lay Lady Lay'." The Buffalo News review by Jeff Simon noted, "Cassandra Wilson is clearly one of the finest jazz singers to emerge from her generation. But it is with live performance that she has made her mark in the jazz world; there, she becomes an improviser non pareil, at once echoing the giants who came before her and suggesting an individual ethic oddly and idiosyncratically beautiful."

A reviewer of NPR added: "On her latest album, Glamoured, Wilson applies her rich, husky voice to a variety of musical genres." A reviewer of Dusty Groove noted: "Don't let the title put you off, because Cassandra Wilson's sounding as soulful as ever – with none of the fluff that you might think from an album called "Glamoured"! The sound is mellow and laidback, with a group that includes Wilson on guitar, alongside a few other guitarists, percussion, and even a bit of harmonica. The instrumentation gives the album a warm and earthy feel that works well with Wilson's vocals."

== Track listing ==
All tracks composed by Cassandra Wilson; except where indicated

1. "Fragile" (Sting) - 4:37
2. "Sleight of Time" - 4:12
3. "I Want More" (Fabrizio Sotti, Wilson) - 4:21
4. "If Loving You Is Wrong" (Homer Banks, Carl Hampton, Raymond Jackson) - 5:29
5. "Lay Lady Lay" (Bob Dylan) - 5:08
6. "Crazy" (Willie Nelson) - 3:02
7. "What Is It?" - 3:19
8. "Heaven Knows" - 5:06
9. "Honey Bee" (Muddy Waters) - 4:48
10. "Broken Drum" - 4:14
11. "On This Train" (Fabrizio Sotti, Wilson) - 4:37
12. "Throw It Away" (Abbey Lincoln) - 4:36

== Personnel ==
- Cassandra Wilson – vocals, acoustic guitar (11)
- Fabrizio Sotti – guitars (1–4, 7, 8, 11)
- Brandon Ross – guitars (5, 6, 9, 10), banjo (9)
- Reginald Veal – acoustic upright bass (1–3, 5–8, 10, 12)
- Calvin Jones – acoustic bass (5, 9)
- Terri Lyne Carrington – drums (1–3, 7, 10)
- Herlin Riley – drums (4, 9), washboard (9)
- Jeff Haynes – percussion (1–11)
- Grégoire Maret – harmonica (2, 3)

=== Production ===
- Bruce Lundvall – executive producer
- Fabrizio Sotti – producer
- Cassandra Wilson – co-producer
- Sean Macke – recording
- Eric Butler – recording, mixing
- Kent Bruce, Peter Doris – assistant engineers
- Chris Athens – mastering at Sterling Sound (New York, NY)
- Judy Jefferson, Donald Thomas – production coordinators
- Gordon H. Jee – creative director, design
- Naomi Kaltman – photography
- Evan Ross – styling
- Eric Spearman – hair, make-up

== Chart positions ==
Year	Chart	Position
2003	Billboard Heatseekers	16
2004	Billboard Top Jazz Albums	2
