= Reeltime (album) =

Studio album by Wynton Marsalis
- Released: November 2, 1999
- Recorded: September 1996
- Genre: Jazz
- Label: Sony Classical

Wynton Marsalis chronology
Listen to the Storytellers (1999)	Reeltime (1999)	Live at the Village Vanguard (1999)

Reeltime is an album by Wynton Marsalis, released in 1999 through Sony Music Distribution. The album peaked at number 17 on Billboard's Top Jazz Albums chart. The album had originally been commissioned as the soundtrack for the 1997 John Singleton film Rosewood, but was ultimately not used.

== Reception ==
Richard S. Ginell of AllMusic wrote, "It's good to hear Marsalis stretching himself all over the spectrum of music of the American South, and always from the point of view of a staunch, respectful traditionalist." C. Michael Bailey of All About Jazz said of the album, "The music here is very fine, reflecting the vision of a controversial figure forging a new path with old methods."

== Track list ==
All tracks are written by Wynton Marsalis, except where noted.

No.	Title	Writer(s)	Length
1.	"Rosewood"		2:42
2.	"Mr. Mann"		3:51
3.	"Sylvester’s Rag"		2:12
4.	"Gentler Times"		2:56
5.	"Gossipin’ Hens"		5:41
6.	"Sunday Blessing"		1:59
7.	"I Hear a Knockin’ (Quartet)"		1:05
8.	"Go, Possum, Go"		2:01
9.	"Eyes Around the Corner"		1:33
10.	"Sing On"	Traditional	2:49
11.	"Morning Song"		2:33
12.	"I Hear a Knockin’ (Solo)"		0:51
13.	"If I Hold On"		1:40
14.	"Elgin Mills"		2:33
15.	"Rattlesnake Tail Swing"		2:32
16.	"Dark Heart Beat"		0:50
17.	"Fire in the Night"		6:31
18.	"Porch Whiskey"		3:18
19.	"To Higher Ground"		4:49
20.	"After the Dead"		2:57
21.	"Rosewood"		4:28
