= Herman Fowlkes Jr. =

American jazz musician and educator (1919–1993)

- Fowlkes (center) with the 201st AGP Band, c. 1940s

Background information
- Born: September 21, 1919
- Origin: Chicago, Illinois, U.S.
- Died: April 3, 1993 (aged 73)
- Genres: Jazz; blues
- Occupations: Musician; educator
- Instruments: Trumpet; bass; guitar
- Years active: 1943–1993
- Label: Trumpet Records
- Children: 3, including Cassandra Wilson

Herman Fowlkes Jr. (September 21, 1919 – April 3, 1993) was an American jazz musician and educator from Chicago, Illinois.

== Biography ==
Fowlkes was the first of two children born to Herman Bradley Fowlkes Sr. and Marie Payne. He was of West African, Irish, Welsh, and Eastern European descent. As a youngster growing up in Chicago Heights, Illinois, he received classical musical training on the violin. Fowlkes later exchanged his violin for a trumpet and became immersed in the burgeoning music scene of post-prohibition era Chicago. At the age of 23, he joined the U.S. Army and traveled south with the 201st AGF Band. While stationed in Mississippi at Camp Shelby, the 201st AGP Band performed for many college and social club dances.

Fowlkes played an integral role in the under-documented Jackson, Mississippi, jazz/R&B scene that produced national figures Teddy Edwards, Freddie Waits, Dick Griffin, and Mel Brown, and local brothers Kermit Jr., Bernard, and Sherrill Holly. Fowlkes came to Jackson in 1948 and studied at Jackson State College with music professor William W. "Prof" Davis. Fowlkes was one of the first Mississippi musicians to play electric bass, beginning in 1952. He performed locally in the bands of Carlia "Duke" Oatis, Clarence "Duke" Huddleston, Joe Dyson, Bernard "Bunny" Williams, and O'Neal Hudson, and worked in jazz and blues combos with musicians including Andy Hardwick, Willie Silas, Charles Fairley, and Al Clark. He toured briefly as the bassist in blues balladeer Ivory Joe Hunter's band and occasionally accompanied national stars, including Sam Cooke and Gatemouth Brown, on local shows. Fowlkes played bass on recording sessions for Trumpet Records with bluesmen Sonny Boy Williamson II and Jerry McCain in 1953 and also recalled recording with New Orleans singer Lloyd Price and others.

Married to Mary McDaniel, he was the father of three children, among whom jazz vocalist Cassandra Wilson was the youngest.
