= Cooter Township, Pemiscot County, Missouri =

Inactive township in the US state of Missouri

Coordinates: 36.0516980°N 89.8136054°W

Cooter Township is an inactive township in Pemiscot County, in the U.S. state of Missouri.

Cooter Township takes its name from the community of Cooter, Missouri.
