= Jumpworld =

Studio album by Cassandra Wilson
- Released: 1990
- Recorded: July and August 1989
- Studio: Systems Two (Brooklyn, New York)
- Genre: Jazz
- Length: 49:46
- Label: JMT; JMT 834 434
- Producer: Cassandra Wilson

Cassandra Wilson chronology
Blue Skies (1988)	Jumpworld (1990)	She Who Weeps (1991)

Professional ratings
Review scores
Source	Rating
AllMusic	2.5/5 stars
The Encyclopedia of Popular Music	3/5 stars
The Penguin Guide to Jazz Recordings	2.5/4 stars
The Rolling Stone Jazz & Blues Album Guide	3/5 stars

Jumpworld is the fourth studio album by American jazz singer Cassandra Wilson. It was released in 1990 by JMT label.

== Track listing ==
1. "Woman on the Edge" (Cassandra Wilson) – 5:02
2. "Domination Switch" (Steve Coleman, Wilson) – 6:20
3. "Phase Jump" (Coleman, Wilson) – 1:40
4. "Lies" (Wilson) – 3:48
5. "Grand System Masters" (Graham Haynes) – 4:37
6. "Jump World" (Kirth Atkins, Steve Coleman, James Moore, Wilson) – 4:40
7. "Love Phases Dimensions" (Kevin Bruce Harris, Rod Williams, Wilson) – 5:27
8. "Whirlwind Soldier" (Wilson) – 4:52
9. "Warm Spot" (Kevin Bruce Harris, Mark Johnson, Williams, Wilson) – 6:24
10. "Dancing in Dream Time" (David Gilmore, Wilson) – 3:53
11. "Rock This Calling" (Coleman, Wilson) – 3:38

== Personnel ==
- Cassandra Wilson – vocals
- Rod Williams – acoustic piano, keyboards
- David Gilmore – guitars
- Kevin Bruce Harris – bass
- Lonnie Plaxico – double bass (2, 8)
- Mark Johnson – drums
- Kirth Atkins – drum programming (6), arrangements (6)
- Greg Osby – alto saxophone (1, 5)
- Gary Thomas – tenor saxophone (1, 5)
- Steve Coleman – alto saxophone (2, 6, 7, 11)
- Robin Eubanks – trombone (1, 2, 5)
- Graham Haynes – trumpet (1, 5)
- J.B. Moore – rap (6)

Production

- Stefan F. Winter – executive producer
- Cassandra Wilson – producer, digital mixing
- Steve Coleman – associate producer, digital mixing
- Jimmy Cozier – associate producer, digital mixing
- Joe Marciano – engineer, digital mixing
- Byron Hunter – project advisor
- Bruce Lincoln – project advisor, concept, liner notes
- Charles Reilly – cover photography
- Lesley Schiff – illustration
- Steve Byram – cover design
- Roxanna Floyd – stylist, hair design
