= Loverly =

Studio album by Cassandra Wilson
- Released: June 10, 2008
- Recorded: August 13–17, 2007
- Studios: Petit Bois Studios, Jackson, Mississippi; Piety Street Recording (New Orleans, Louisiana)
- Genre: Jazz
- Length: 1:00:43
- Label: Blue Note
- Producer: Cassandra Wilson

Cassandra Wilson chronology
Thunderbird (2006)	Loverly (2008)	Silver Pony (2010)

Professional ratings
Aggregate scores
Source	Rating
Metacritic	79/100
Review scores
Source	Rating
Allmusic	3.5/5 stars
All About Jazz	(favorable)
The Buffalo News	4/4 stars
The Guardian	4/5 stars
laut.de	2/5 stars
PopMatters	8/10
The Press	5/5 stars
Rolling Stone	3.5/5 stars
Tom Hull	A−
Toronto Star	3/4 stars

Loverly is a studio album by American jazz singer Cassandra Wilson, released in 2008 via Blue Note label. This is her second-ever album of jazz standards. Loverly won the Grammy Award as the Best Jazz Vocal Album in 2008.

== Reception ==
Andy Gill of The Independent wrote: "For Loverly, she reverts to the bread-and-butter of traditional jazz vocals, with a set consisting almost entirely of standards recorded with a small combo featuring the exploratory piano of Jason Moran and the diffident guitar of Marvin Sewell. The decisive player, however, is Nigerian percussionist Lekan Babalola, whose polyrhythmic flurries perk up Duke Ellington's 'Caravan' and a version of 'Gone With the Wind' whose elegant unison guitar and piano recalls Steely Dan." John Fordham of The Guardian state: " It's one of this enigmatic artist's most satisfying albums in a long time." The Buffalo News review by Jeff Simon noted, "...that's what "Loverly" is—the jazz vocal disc of the year, thus far, at the very least. No one else could have made this disc. It's joy from beginning to end."

Kathryn Shackleton of BBC commented: "Cassandra Wilson is best known for singing originals and unusual covers, but standards are where she started. Loverly was produced in a rented house in her Mississippi hometown, with assembled invited musician friends who got down to the business of recording then and there. It’s impressive to hear the class and character Cassandra has injected into these 20th century songs." John Bungey of The Times added: "Wilson’s smoky alto remains one of the most beguiling sounds in jazz and blues."

== Track listing ==
1. "Lover, Come Back to Me" (Sigmund Romberg, Oscar Hammerstein II) – 4:16
2. "Black Orpheus (Manhã de Carnaval)" (Luiz Bonfá, Antônio Maria) – 4:58
3. "Wouldn't It Be Loverly" (Alan Jay Lerner, Frederick Loewe) – 5:02
4. "Gone With the Wind" (Herb Magidson, Allie Wrubel) – 5:51
5. "Caravan" (Duke Ellington, Juan Tizol, Irving Mills) – 4:23
6. "'Til There Was You" (Meredith Willson) – 6:42
7. "Spring Can Really Hang You Up the Most" (Fran Landesman, Tommy Wolf) – 5:01
8. "Arere" (Babalola, Moran, Plaxico, Riley, Sewell, Wilson) – 5:42
9. "St. James Infirmary" (Irving Mills) – 4:40
10. "Dust My Broom" (Elmore James, Robert Johnson) – 4:46
11. "The Very Thought of You" (Ray Noble) – 4:47
12. "A Sleepin' Bee" (Harold Arlen, Truman Capote) – 4:35

== Personnel ==
- Cassandra Wilson – vocals
- Jason Moran – acoustic piano (on all tracks, except 7, 11)
- Marvin Sewell – guitars (exc. 11)
- Lonnie Plaxico – acoustic bass (exc. 7, 11)
- Reginald Veal – acoustic bass (11)
- Herlin Riley – drums (exc. 7, 11)
- Lekan Babalola – percussion (exc. 3, 7, 11)
- Nicholas Payton – trumpet (1)
- Rhonda Richmond – backing vocals (8)

=== Production ===
- Cassandra Wilson – producer
- Donald Thomas – assistant producer
- Jason Wormer – recording
- Emile Kelman – recording assistant
- John Fischbach – mixing, mastering
- Wesley Fontenot – mix assistant
- Bruce Lundvall – executive producer
- Eli Wolf – A&R
- Keith Karwelies – A&R administrator
- Shanieka D. Brooks – product manager
- Gordon H. Jee – creative director, design
- Jenny Bagert – photography
- Steven Bensusan and Adam Hertz for Blue Note Management Group – management

== Chart positions ==
Year	Chart	Position
2008	Billboard Top Jazz Albums	3
2008	Billboard Heatseekers	19
