= M-Base =

Music genre

The term "M-Base" is a term coined in the 1980s by American musician Steve Coleman to describe a new theory about creative expression. "M-Base-concept" is short for "macro-basic array of structured extemporization", and critics have used this term to categorize this scene's music as a style of jazz. But Coleman stressed "M-Base" doesn't denote a musical style but a way of thinking about creating music. However, Coleman has expressed discomfort with the term “jazz” to describe his music and also says M-Base was intended to be more expansive than describing music alone.

M-Base was associated with a loose collective of young African American musicians and other performers active in and around Brooklyn, New York. The M-Base collective included Coleman, Graham Haynes, Cassandra Wilson, Geri Allen, Robin Eubanks, and Greg Osby.

However, the musicians of the M-Base movement, which also included dancers and poets, strived for common creative musical languages, so their early recordings show many similarities reflecting their common ideas, the experiences of working together, and their similar cultural background. To label this kind of music, jazz critics have established the word "M-Base" as a jazz style for lack of a better term, distorting its original meaning.

== Music associated with the term "M-Base" ==
In 1991 a significant number of M-Base participants labelled as "M-Base Collective" recorded the CD Anatomy of a Groove. Most of them previously contributed to CDs by alto saxophonist Steve Coleman, whose creativity has been a pivotal factor in that movement, although he refused to be called its leader or founder. Coleman and his friend Greg Osby, who plays alto saxophone in a related style, together led the group Strata Institute, which recorded two CDs (the second with tenor saxophonist Von Freeman as a further leader). Under the name of Osby, a number of CDs with a specific character have been released starting in 1987, which also coined the perception of "M-Base" jazz. Tenor saxophonist and flutist Gary Thomas admittedly didn't take part in the M-Base initiative, but joined them, and there were similarities in his way of playing. He can be heard on recordings of Coleman and Osby, and his own CDs are also labelled as "M-Base-style". All three saxophonists contributed to the CD Jumpworld by singer Cassandra Wilson.

Pianist Andrew Hill said about Greg Osby: "He has an incredible sense of rhythm and harmonic accuracy, and picks the right notes with a precision that isn't common to people with his technical versatility. He's developed into a fully rounded artist who can play various styles extremely well – better than most." Greg Osby said about Gary Thomas: "He's extremely intelligent and has a capacity for absorption that exceeds that of most people that I know […] He has his own compositional and improvisational method that is peerless in my opinion. He's my favourite tenor saxophone player on the contemporary scene." Clarinettist and composer Don Byron called Steve Coleman "an exceptional personality of American music history."

Antecedents to M-Base were identified by jazz critic Bill Milkowski as the Miles Davis-led band featured on recordings like 1975's Agharta; he noted the combination of Sonny Fortune's acerbic saxophone lines atop the syncopated grooves performed by the rhythm section of drummer Al Foster, bassist Michael Henderson, and rhythm guitarist Reggie Lucas.

== Further history ==
The ideas of the M-Base concept were largely incompatible with the requirements of music business. Most participants of the M-Base movement turned to more conventional music. Cassandra Wilson's blues- and folk-influenced music has been fairly suitable for an adaption to the taste of a larger audience. Wilson has been signed to Blue Note Records since 1993. Though two of Gary Thomas' recordings were highly rated by DownBeat he only had a contract with a small European company and his performance opportunities were virtually limited to Europe. Since 1997, he has put his career as a bandleader on hold to teach at Peabody Music Institute. Greg Osby signed with Blue Note Records in 1990 and developed a specific balancing act between an enhanced reverence to tradition and maintaining his new direction. In 2008, Osby launched his own small label. Steve Coleman has developed his music further in accordance with the M-Base concept. In the 1990s his CDs were released by the major label BMG. Thereafter he became practically an underground artist in the U.S. again, in that his music was only available as imports, distributed by a small French label. In 2007 John Zorn's small label Tzadik Records released a solo CD of Coleman. In 2010 the small advanced label Pi Recordings began to release Steve Coleman's recordings.

Although the musical line initially called "M-Base" became more than ever focused on Steve Coleman, a number of younger musicians (e.g. a range of excellent drummers) have made substantial creative contributions to his music and his influence is to be found in several musical fields – both in terms of music technique and of the music's meaning. Pianist Vijay Iyer (who was chosen as "Jazz Musician of the Year 2010" by the Jazz Journalists Association) said, "It's hard to overstate Steve [Coleman's] influence. He's affected more than one generation, as much as anyone since John Coltrane. It's not just that you can connect the dots by playing seven or 11 beats. What sits behind his influence is this global perspective on music and life. He has a point of view of what he does and why he does it."

== M-Base concept ==
Steve Coleman explained the substantial elements of the concept as:

- improvisation and structure
- contemporary relevance
- music as expression of life experience
- growth through creativity and philosophical broadening
- use of non-western concepts

The M-Base concept reminds of the creative energy of the bebop originators, their loose collective, and also of their musical goals. The concept does not include "neo-classical jazz", free music without structures, fusion music, music which isn't mainly improvised, or music shaped with respect to commercial aspects.
