= Cooter Brown =

Name used in metaphors for drunkenness

Cooter Brown, sometimes given as Cootie Brown, is a name used in metaphors and similes for drunkenness, mostly in the Southern United States.

According to an employee of a New Orleans oyster bar who was contacted by the Old Farmer's Almanac, Cooter Brown supposedly lived on the line which divided the North and South during the American Civil War, making him eligible for military draft by either side. He had family on both sides of the line, so he did not want to fight in the war. He decided to get drunk and stay drunk for the duration of the war so that he would be seen as useless for military purposes and would not be drafted. Ever since, colloquial and proverbial ratings of drunkenness have been benchmarked against the legendary drinker: "as drunk as Cooter Brown" or "drunker than Cooter Brown."

Another version of the Cooter Brown story says that he was a biracial man (half Cherokee, half African) who lived in southern Louisiana on a small plot of land given to him by an old Cajun fur trapper. Cooter lived alone in the old Cajun's shack. When the Civil War broke out, Cooter didn't want to choose sides, because he didn't know who might win. He didn't like people much and was fearful of both sides. Because of this, Cooter, who was a heavy drinker anyway, began drinking all the time. Cooter always dressed like a Native American so as to confirm the fact that he was a Native American and not a Black man, and as such he was a free man. Whenever soldiers (Yanks or Rebels) showed-up in the area they would always find him drunk. Often he would offer the soldiers a drink. Word began to spread about the crazy drunk named Cooter Brown. By the time the war ended, Cooter couldn't have stopped drinking even if he had wanted to. One night his shack caught fire and burned completely to the ground. When locals investigated the burned site the next day there was nothing that remained of Cooter's body. They surmised that old Cooter had so much alcohol in him that he had just burned up. Since then Cooter Brown has been synonymous with inebriation.
