= Cassandra Wilson =

American jazz singer, songwriter, and producer (1955–2026)

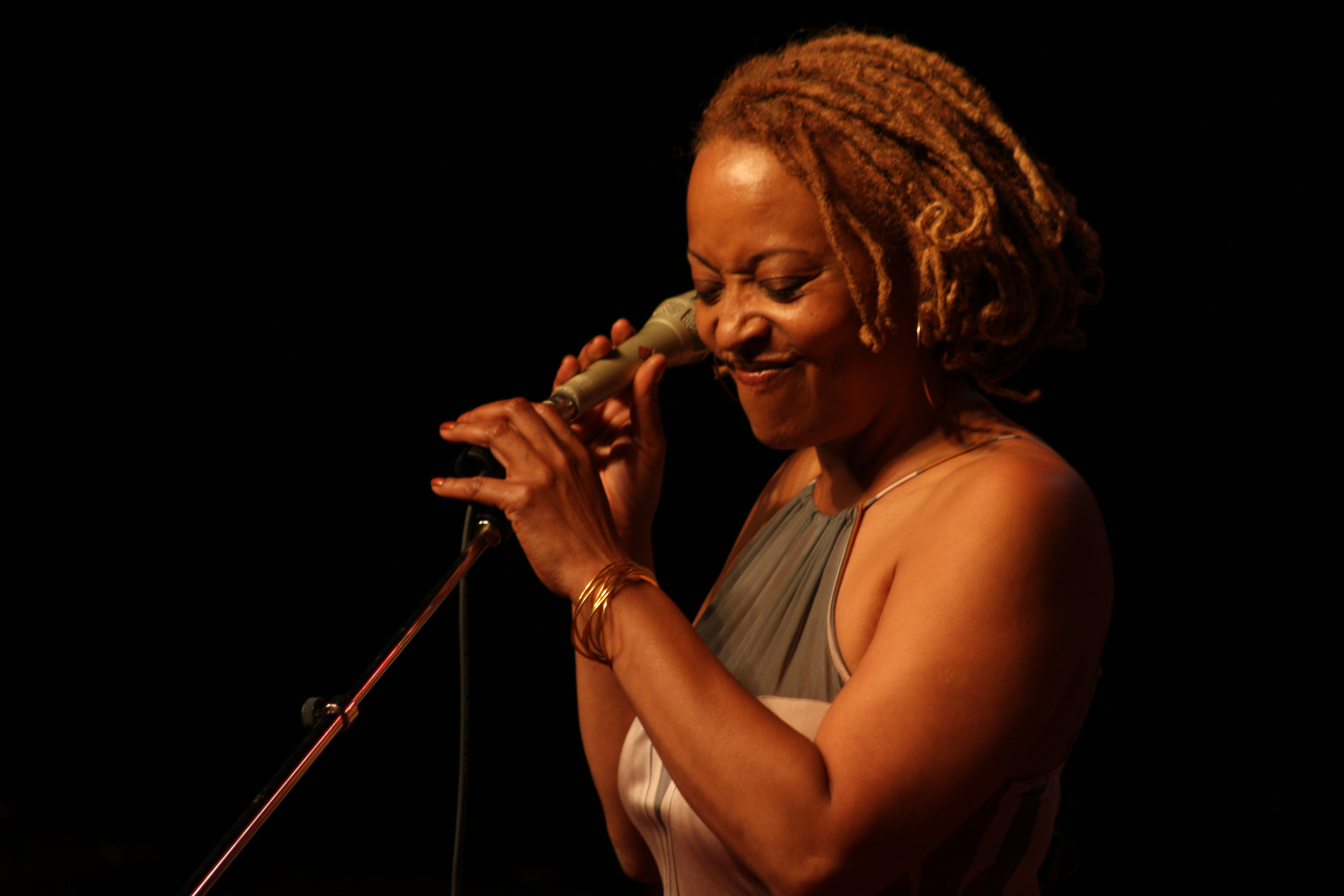
- Wilson in 2008

Background information
- Born: Cassandra Fowlkes; December 4, 1955; Jackson, Mississippi, U.S.
- Died: September 2, 2026 (aged 70) Jackson, Mississippi, U.S.
- Education: Millsaps College; Jackson State University
- Genre: Jazz
- Occupations: Singer; songwriter; producer
- Instruments: vocals; guitar
- Years active: 1985–2026
- Labels: JMT; Blue Note
- Spouses: Anthony Wilson (1981–1983); Isaach de Bankolé (2000–2003)
- Website: cassandrawilson.com
- Children: 1 son
- Father: Herman Fowlkes Jr.

Cassandra Wilson (née Fowlkes; December 4, 1955 – September 2, 2026) was an American jazz singer, songwriter and producer from Jackson, Mississippi. She was one of the most successful female jazz singers and has been described by critic Gary Giddins as "a singer blessed with an unmistakable timbre and attack [who has] expanded the playing field" by incorporating blues, country, and folk music into her work. She won numerous awards, including two Grammys, and was named "America's Best Singer" by Time magazine in 2001.

== Early life and career ==
Wilson was the third and youngest child of Herman Fowlkes Jr., a guitarist, bassist, and music teacher, and Mary McDaniel, an elementary school teacher who earned her PhD in education. Her parents listened to Motown and jazz, which sparked her early interest in music.

Her earliest formal musical education consisted of classical lessons; she studied piano from the age of six to thirteen and played clarinet in her middle school concert and marching bands. When she was tired of this training, she asked her father to teach her the guitar. Instead, he gave her a lesson in self-reliance, suggesting she study Mel Bay method books. Wilson explored guitar on her own, developing what she described as an "intuitive" approach. During this time, she began writing her own songs, adopting a folk style. She also appeared in musical theater productions, including The Wizard of Oz as Dorothy, crossing racial lines in a recently desegregated school system.

Wilson attended Millsaps College and Jackson State University. She graduated with a degree in mass communications from Jackson State. Outside of the classroom, she spent her nights working with R&B, funk, and pop cover bands, also singing in local coffeehouses. The Black Arts Music Society, founded by John Reese and Alvin Fielder, provided her with her first opportunities to perform bebop. In 2007, Wilson received an honorary doctorate in Arts from Millsaps College.

In 1981, she moved to New Orleans to take up a position as assistant public affairs director for the local television station, WDSU. She did not stay long. But she already participated as vocalist in a first recording by a New Orleans based Latin band called Jasmine. The album was produced by Allen Toussaint and taped at his studio in Gentilly, Sea Saint. Working with mentors who included elder statesmen Earl Turbinton, Alvin Batiste, and Ellis Marsalis, Wilson found encouragement to seriously pursue jazz performance and moved to New York City the following year.

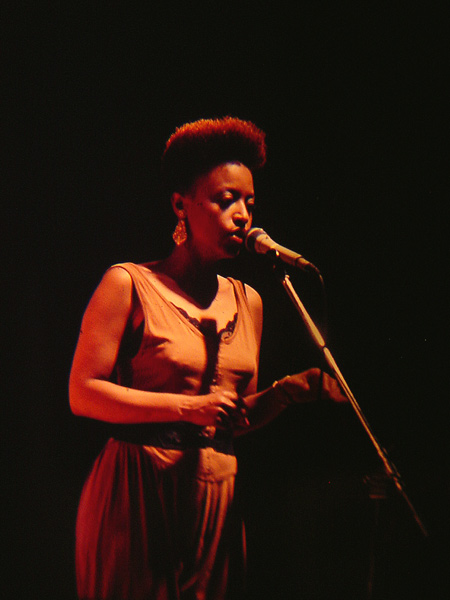
Wilson in 1987

== Musical association with M-Base ==
In New York, Wilson's focus turned towards improvisation. Heavily influenced by singers Abbey Lincoln and Betty Carter, she fine-tuned her vocal phrasing and scat while studying ear training with trombonist Grachan Moncur III. Frequenting jam sessions under the tutelage of pianist Sadik Hakim, a Charlie Parker alumnus, she met alto saxophonist Steve Coleman, who encouraged her to look beyond the standard jazz repertoire in favor of developing original material. She would become the vocalist and one of the founding members of the M-Base collective in which Coleman was the leading figure, a stylistic outgrowth of the Association for the Advancement of Creative Musicians (AACM) and Black Artists Group (BAG), that re-imagined the grooves of funk and soul within the context of traditional and avant-garde jazz. Peter Watrous in an article for The New York Times states:

The M-Base group in Brooklyn, working with both jazz and pop forms, makes music that at first sounds like funk from the 1970s. Like the music played by Mr. Marsalis (and his brother Wynton) the music made by M-Base – Steve Coleman, with Greg Osby, Cassandra Wilson and Geri Allen – is, at its best, filled with subtle ideas working behind the mask of popular music. In Mr. Coleman's group a singer is supported by an electric bass, guitar, drums and electric keyboards, a shiny musical mix that has familiar rock and funk references; yet, because of all its rhythmic and metric manipulations, sounds new.

Although the voice – typically treated as the focal point of any arrangement in which it is included – was not an obvious choice for M-Base's complex textures or harmonically elaborated melodies, Wilson wove herself into the fabric of these settings with wordless improv and lyrics. She can be heard on Coleman's debut as a leader, Motherland Pulse (1985), then as member of his "Five Elements" on On the Edge of Tomorrow (1986), World Expansion (1986), Sine Die (1987), and on M-Base Collective's sole recording as a large ensemble Anatomy of a Groove (1992).

At the same time, Wilson toured with avant-garde trio New Air, featuring alto saxophonist Henry Threadgill, and recorded Air Show No. 1 (1987) in Italy. A decade her senior and an AACM member, Threadgill has been lauded as a composer for his ability to transcend stylistic boundaries, a trait he and Wilson shared.

== Solo career ==
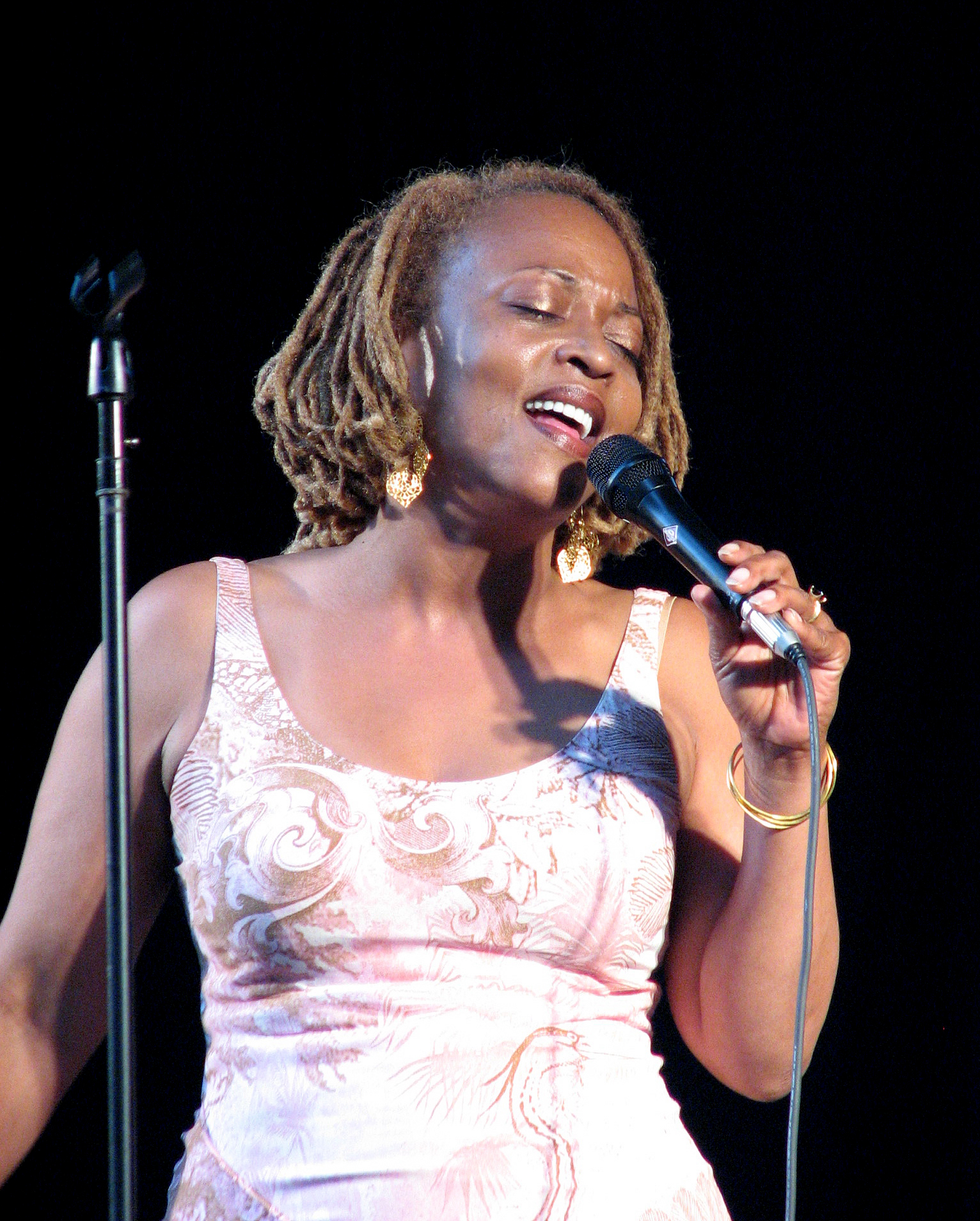
Wilson at the Charlie Parker Jazz Festival, New York City, 2007

Her first recording as an solo artist was Newyorker in a Sentimental Mood, recorded in 1985 in Japan for the Label JAL Strato Sound. Like fellow M-Base artists, Wilson signed to the Munich-based, independent label JMT. She released her first recording as a leader, Point of View, in 1986. Like the majority of her JMT albums that followed, originals by Wilson in keeping with M-Base dominated these sessions; she would also record material by and co-written with Coleman, Jean-Paul Bourelly, and James Weidman, as well as a few standards. Her throaty contralto gradually emerges over the course of these recordings, making its way to the foreground. She developed an ability to stretch and bend pitches, elongate syllables, manipulate tone and timbre from dusky to hollow.

While these recordings established her as a serious musician, Wilson received her first broad critical acclaim for the album of standards recorded in the middle of this period, Blue Skies (1988). Her signing with Blue Note Records in 1993 marked a crucial turning point in her career and a major breakthrough to audiences beyond jazz, with albums selling in the hundreds of thousands of copies.

Beginning with Blue Light 'til Dawn (1993), her repertoire moved towards a broad synthesis of blues, pop, jazz, world music, and country. Although she continued to perform originals and standards, she adopted songs as diverse as Robert Johnson's "Come On in My Kitchen", Joni Mitchell's "Black Crow", The Monkees' "Last Train to Clarksville", and Hank Williams's "I'm So Lonesome I Could Cry".

Wilson's 1996 album New Moon Daughter won the Grammy for Best Jazz Vocal Performance. In 1997, she recorded and toured as a featured vocalist with Wynton Marsalis's Pulitzer Prize-winning composition "Blood on the Fields".

Miles Davis was one of Wilson's greatest influences. In 1989, Wilson performed as the opening act for Davis at the JVC Jazz Festival in Chicago. In 1999, she produced the album Traveling Miles as a tribute to Davis. The album developed from a series of jazz concerts that she had performed at the Lincoln Center in November 1997 in Davis's honor. It includes three selections based on Davis's own compositions, from which Wilson adapted the original themes.

== Personal life and death ==
Wilson was married to Anthony Wilson from 1981 to 1983.

She had a son, Jeris, born in the late 1980s. Her song "Out Loud (Jeris' Blues)" on the 1991 album She Who Weeps is dedicated to him. For many years, Wilson and her son lived in New York City's Sugar Hill, in an apartment that had once belonged to Count Basie, Lena Horne, and the boxer Joe Louis.

From 2000 to 2003, Wilson was married to actor Isaach de Bankolé, who directed her in the concert film Traveling Miles: Cassandra Wilson (2000).

Wilson and her mother were members of Alpha Kappa Alpha sorority.

Wilson died in Jackson, Mississippi on September 2, 2026, at the age of 70.

== Awards and honors ==
- 1994–1996: Female Jazz Vocalist of the Year, DownBeat
- 1997: Grammy Award for Best Jazz Vocal Performance, New Moon Daughter
- 1999: Miles Davis Prize, Montreal International Jazz Festival
- 2001: "America's Best Singer", Time
- 2003: Honorary doctorate in the arts, Millsaps College
- 2009: Grammy Award for Best Jazz Vocal Album, Loverly
- 2010: Added to Mississippi Blues Trail
- 2010: Best Vocal Album, NPR Music Jazz Critics Poll 2010, Silver Pony
- 2011: Best Traditional Jazz Album, BET Soul Train Award, Silver Pony
- 2015: Honorary doctorate in fine arts, The New School
- 2015: Spirit of Ireland Award, Irish Arts Centre
- 2020: Honorary doctorate in music, Berklee College of Music

== Discography ==
=== As leader ===
- Newyorker in a Sentimental Mood (JAL Strato Sound, 1985)
- Point of View (JMT, 1986)
- Days Aweigh (JMT, 1987)
- Blue Skies (JMT, 1988)
- Jumpworld (JMT, 1990)
- Live (JMT, 1991)
- She Who Weeps (JMT, 1991)
- Dance to the Drums Again (DIW, 1992)
- After the Beginning Again (JMT, 1992)
- Blue Light 'til Dawn (Blue Note, 1993)
- New Moon Daughter (Blue Note, 1995)
- Rendezvous with Jacky Terrasson (Blue Note, 1997)
- Traveling Miles (Blue Note, 1999)
- Belly of the Sun (Blue Note, 2002)
- Glamoured (Blue Note, 2003)
- Thunderbird (Blue Note, 2006)
- Loverly (Blue Note, 2008)
- Silver Pony (Blue Note, 2010)
- Another Country (eOne, 2012))
- Coming Forth by Day (Legacy, 2015)

Compilations

- Songbook (JMT, 1995)
- Sings Standards (Verve, 2002)
- Love Phases Dimensions: From the JMT Years (Edel, 2004)
- Closer to You: The Pop Side (Blue Note, 2009)
- 5 Original Albums (Blue Note, 2018)

=== As guest ===
| Song(s) (composers) | Main artist | Album title | Release date | Label | Notes |
|---|---|---|---|---|---|
| "No Good Time Fairies" (Steve Coleman) | Steve Coleman | Motherland Pulse | 1985 | JMT | |
| [throughout] (Steve Coleman a. o.) | Steve Coleman and Five Elements | On the Edge of Tomorrow | 1986 | JMT | |
| "Don't Drink That Corner My Life Is in the Bush", "Apricots on Their Wings" (Henry Threadgill, C. Wilson) | New Air | Air Show No. 1 | 1986 | Black Saint | |
| "Mad Monkey" (Steve Coleman), "Dream State" (Geri Allen), "Just a Funky Old Song" (Graham Haynes) | Steve Coleman and Five Elements | World Expansion | 1987 | JMT | |
| [throughout] (Steve Coleman, Cassandra Wilson) | Steve Coleman and Five Elements | Sine Die | 1988 | Pangaea | |
| "Armageddon (Cold-Blood-Ed)" (Steve Coleman) | Steve Coleman and Five Elements | Rhythm People (The Resurrection of Creative Black Civilization) | 1990 | RCA | |
| "Season of Renewal", "Word", "Spirit Hour" (Greg Osby) | Greg Osby | Season of Renewal | 1990 | JMT | |
| "The X Format", "Beyond All We Know", "A Vial of Calm" (Steve Coleman) | Steve Coleman and Five Elements | Black Science | 1991 | Novus | |
| "Resolution of Love" (Robin Eubanks, Nan Saville) | Robin Eubanks | Karma | 1991 | JMT | |
| "The Journeyman" (Steve Coleman) | Steve Coleman and Five Elements | Drop Kick | 1992 | Novus | |
| [throughout] (lyrics by C. Wilson for "Non-Fiction", "Cycle of Change" and "One Bright Morning") | M-Base Collective | Anatomy of a Groove | 1992 | Columbia | |
| "Honor the Example" (Greg Osby, Are Em) | Greg Osby | 3-D Lifestyles | 1993 | Blue Note | |
| "Swept Away", "Silent Treatment" (The Roots) | The Roots | Do You Want More?!!!??! | 1994 | DGC | featured together with Steve Coleman |
| "Crazy Love" (Van Morrison) | various artists | No Prima Donna: The Songs of Van Morrison | 1994 | | |
| "Equality" (Dave Holland, Maya Angelou) | Dave Holland | Dream of the Elders | 1995 | ECM | |
| "Don't 'Xplain" (Arthur Herzog Jr., Billie Holiday), "I've Known Rivers" (Gary Bartz) | Courtney Pine | Modern Day Jazz Stories | 1995 | Antilles | Remixes of both on Another Story, 1998 |
| "Drifting – Villanova Junction" (Jimi Hendrix) | Vernon Reid, Jack Bruce, Trilok Gurtu, Wilson a. o. | Voodoo Chile: The Music of Jimi Hendrix | 1995 | Vap Video, Japan [laserdisc] | Live at Jazz Open, Stuttgart, Germany |
| "Killing Me Softly" (Roberta Flack, arranged by C. Wilson and Lonnie Plaxico) | various artists | Spirit of '73: Rock for Choice | 1995 | | |
| "The Little Drummer Boy" (Kath. Kennicott Davis) | various artists | Jazz to the World | 1995 | A&M | |
| "Come Together" (Lennon/McCartney) | Bob Belden | Strawberry Fields | 1996 | Blue Note | duet with Dianne Reeves |
| "Country Girl" (Muddy Waters) | Javon Jackson | A Look Within | 1996 | Blue Note | |
| "Dee Like a Breeze" (David Sanchez) | David Sanchez | Street Scenes | 1996 | Columbia | |
| "One Shine" (The Roots) | The Roots | Illadelph Halflife | 1996 | DGC | |
| "Time of the Season" (Rod Argent [The Zombies]) | Kurt Elling | The Messenger | 1997 | Blue Note | |
| "Move Over" (Wynton Marsalis) | Wynton Marsalis with the Lincoln Center Jazz Orchestra | Blood on the Fields | 1997 | Columbia | |
| "In a Sentimental Mood" (Duke Ellington, arranged by Turre) | Steve Turre | Steve Turre | 1997 | Verve | |
| "The Good Life" (Jack Reardon, Sacha Distel) | various artists | Lounge-a-Palooza | 1997 | Hollywood | |
| "You Move Me" (Cassandra Wilson) | various artists | OST Love Jones | 1997 | Columbia | |
| "Days of Wine & Roses" (Andy Williams) | various artists | OST Midnight in the Garden of Good and Evil | 1997 | Malpaso/Warner | |
| "Never Know" (A. Kidjo, Robbie Nevil, Jean Hebrail) | Angelique Kidjo | Oremi | 1998 | Island | |
| "I'm Only Human" (L. Vandross, Marcus Miller) | Luther Vandross | I Know | 1998 | EMI | duet |
| "Papa Was a Rolling Stone" (Norman Whitfield and Barrett Strong) | Regina Carter | Rhythms of the Heart | 1999 | Verve | |
| "The 42 Assessors" (Steve Coleman) | Steve Coleman and Five Elements | The Ascension to Light | 1999 | BMG France | |
| "Painted from Memory", "I Still Have That Other Girl" (E. Costello, B. Bacharach, arranged by B. Frisell) | Elvis Costello, Burt Bacharach, Bill Frisell | The Sweetest Punch | 1999 | Decca | duet on the second song |
| "Rosewood" 1 & 2 (Wynton Marsalis) | Wynton Marsalis | Reeltime | 1999 | Sony | |
| "The Ladies Who Lunch" (Stephen Sondheim) | Don Byron | A Fine Line: Arias & Lieder | 2000 | Blue Note | |
| "Don't Blame Me", "On the Sunny Side of the Street" (Jimmy McHugh, Dorothy Fields) | Terence Blanchard | Let's Get Lost | 2001 | Sony | |
| "Used to Be" (Ah-Keisha McCants, O. Dara) | Olu Dara | Neighborhoods | 2001 | Atlantic | |
| "Leaves" (Tom Harrell) | Tom Harrell | Wise Children | 2003 | Bluebird | |
| "The Chosen" (Meshell Ndegeocello) | Meshell Ndegeocello | The Spirit Music Jamia: Dance of the Infidel | 2005 | Shanachie | |
| "Sacred Ground", "The Prophet of Doom" (D. Murray, Ishmael Reed) | David Murray Black Saint Quartet | Sacred Ground | 2007 | Justin Time | |
| "Enough" (J. Owen, Sean Hurley) | Judith Owen | Happy This Way | 2007 | Courgette | bonus track, also as Quantic Remix |
| "For the Roses" (Joni Mitchell) | various artists | A Tribute to Joni Mitchell | 2007 | Reprise | |
| "My Love and I" (Johnny Mercer, David Raksin) | Charlie Haden Quartet West | Sophisticated Ladies | 2010 | EmArcy | |
| "You Take Me Places I've Never Been Before" (N. Payton) | Nicholas Payton | Bitches | 2011 | In+Out | |
| "Cry Me a River" (Arthur Hamilton) | Count Basie Orchestra | Ella 100: Live at the Apollo! | 2020 | Concord | Ella Fitzgerald tribute |
