= Jerusalem (disambiguation) =

Jerusalem is the claimed capital of Israel and Palestine.

Jerusalem or Jeruzalem may also refer to:

== Places ==
=== Middle East ===
- Jerusalem District, State of Israel
- Jerusalem Governorate, Palestinian National Authority
- Mutasarrifate of Jerusalem, an Ottoman District from 1872 to 1917
- Kingdom of Jerusalem, a Christian kingdom from 1099 to 1291

=== United States ===
- Jerusalem, Arkansas, unincorporated community in Conway County
- Jerusalem, Maryland, unincorporated community
  - Jerusalem Mill Village, living history museum in Maryland
- Jerusalem, Michigan, an unincorporated community
- Jerusalem, New York, town in Yates County
- Jerusalem, Ohio, village in Monroe County
- Jerusalem, Rhode Island, an unincorporated village in the incorporated town of Narragansett in Washington County
- Jerusalem, Virginia, former name of Courtland, a town in Southampton County
- Jerusalem and Figtree Hill, U.S. Virgin Islands
- Jerusalem Township, Lucas County, Ohio

=== New Zealand ===
- Jerusalem, New Zealand, also known as Hiruharama, a village in the Manawatu-Whanganui Region
- Hiruharama, a transliteration of "Jerusalem", a village in the Gisborne District

=== Other places ===
- Colebrook, Tasmania, also known as Jerusalem in the 19th century
- Jerusalem of Lithuania, a medieval nickname for Vilnius, Lithuania for it being a cultural center of Litvak Jews
- Jerusalem (Vilnius), city part
- Jerusalem, Lincolnshire, a village in England
- Jeruzalem, Ljutomer, a village in Slovenia
- Jeruzalem, Pomeranian Voivodeship, a village in Poland
- Jerusalem (Königsberg), a former quarter of Königsberg, Prussia
- Jerusalem, a village and administrative part of Příbram, Czech Republic
- Yerusalimka or Ierusalimka, a Jewish quarter of the town of Vinnytsia

== Arts ==
=== Literature ===
- Jerusalem Delivered, a 1581 epic poem by Torquato Tasso
- "Jerusalem" (poem), common name for the 1804 poem "And did those feet in ancient time" by William Blake
- Jerusalem The Emanation of the Giant Albion, an illuminated book created from 1804 to 1820 by William Blake
- Jerusalem (Mendelssohn), philosophical book published in 1783
- Jerusalem (Lagerlöf novel), 1901, by Selma Lagerlöf
- Jerusalem, 1996 novel by Cecelia Holland
- Jerusalém, 2005 novel by Gonçalo M. Tavares
- Jerusalem, 2009 novel by Patrick Neate
- Jerusalem: The Biography, 2011 historical book by Simon Sebag Montefiore
- Jerusalem (Moore novel), 2016, by Alan Moore
- O Jerusalem!, an epic history of the city

=== Music ===
==== Albums ====
- Jerusalem (Jerusalem album), by the Swedish band Jerusalem, 1978
- Jerusalem (Sleep album), title of an unauthorized 1999 release of Sleep's third album, also released as Dopesmoker
- Jerusalem (Steve Earle album), 2002
- Jerusalem (EP), by Mark Stewart
- Jerusalem, by Alpha Blondy featuring the Wailers, 1986
- Jerusalem, by Emahoy Tsegué-Maryam Guèbrou, 2023

==== Other uses in music ====
- Jerusalem-Yerushalayim, 2008 oratorio-musical by Antony Pitts
- Jerusalem (British band), early 1970s
- Jerusalem (Swedish band), founded in 1975
- Jérusalem, 1847 opera by Giuseppe Verdi

==== Songs ====
- "Jerusalem" (hymn), a setting to music of Blake's poem And did those feet in ancient time, written by Sir Hubert Parry in 1916 and used as a hymn
  - "Jerusalem", 1973 song from Brain Salad Surgery by Emerson, Lake & Palmer
  - "Jerusalem", 1981 track on Chariots of Fire by Ambrosian Singers and Vangelis
  - "Jerusalem", 1988 track on I Am Kurious Oranj by The Fall
  - "Blake's Jerusalem", 1990 song on The Internationale by Billy Bragg
  - "Jerusalem", a song from The Chemical Wedding by Bruce Dickinson
- "Jerusalem of Gold", Israeli patriotic song written in 1967
- "Jerusalem", 1970 instrumental by Herb Alpert from Summertime
- "Jerusalem", 1971 song on Long Player by The Faces
- "The Holy City" (song), a religious Victorian ballad dating from 1892, sometimes known as "Jerusalem" because of the prominence of that word in the refrain
- "Jerusalem" (Belouis Some song), from his 1985 album Some People
- "Jerusalem" (Alphaville song), from their 1986 album Afternoons in Utopia
- "Jerusalem", title song from the 1986 album by Alpha Blondy featuring The Wailers
- "Jerusalem", 1987 song by Sinéad O'Connor from The Lion and the Cobra
- "Jerusalem", 1990 song by Black Sabbath from Tyr
- "Jerusalem" (Dan Bern song), 1996 work from Dog Boy Van by Dan Bern
- "Jerusalem", 2004 song by Dutch singer Anouk on Hotel New York
- "Jerusalem (Out of Darkness Comes Light)", 2006 work by Hasidic reggae musician Matisyahu
- "Jerusalem", 2007 song by Stanley Clarke from The Toys of Men
- "Jerusalem", 2010 song by Rosamund Pike, Tom Wilkinson, Stephen Merchant, Sanjeev Bhaskar, Pam Ferris and cast from Jackboots on Whitehall
- "With a Shout (Jerusalem)", 1981 song by U2 from October
- "Jerusalem on the Jukebox", 1988 song by Richard Thompson from Amnesia

=== Other arts ===
- Jerusalem (1996 film), 1996 Swedish film, directed by Bille August, based on Selma Lagerlöf's 1901 novel
- Jerusalem (2013 film), a National Geographic documentary narrated by Benedict Cumberbatch
- Jerusalem (painting), 1867, by Jean-Léon Gérôme
- Jerusalem (play), 2009 work created by Jez Butterworth
- Jeruzalem (film), 2015 Israeli film directed by Doron Paz and Yoav Paz
- "Jerusalem" (Industry), a 2022 television episode

== Other uses ==
- Jerusalem (surname), including a list of people with the name
- Jerusalem artichoke, a vegetable
- Jerusalem (computer virus)
- Jerusalem College of Engineering, Chennai, an engineering college in Tamil Nadu, India
- Jerusalem! Tactical Game of the 1948 War, a 1975 board wargame that simulates the 1948 Arab-Israeli War
- Jerusalem: The Three Roads to the Holy Land, 2002 historical adventure video game
- Spider Jerusalem, fictional character in the comic Transmetropolitan
- RK Jeruzalem Ormož, Slovenian handball club

== See also ==
- Yerushalmi (disambiguation)
- Jeruzalem (disambiguation)
- Al-Quds (disambiguation)
- Bayt al-Maqdis (disambiguation)
- Aleje Jerozolimskie (literally Jerusalem Avenues), a street in Warsaw, Poland
- East Jerusalem
- West Jerusalem
- Eyerusalem, given name
