= Jeruzalem =

Jeruzalem may refer to:

- Jerusalem, city in Israel/Palestine
- Jeruzalem, Ljutomer, a village in Slovenia
- Jeruzalem, Pomeranian Voivodeship, a village in Poland
- RK Jeruzalem Ormož, Slovenian handball team
- Alexandre de Jesus Jeruzalem Júnior, Brazilian footballer
- Jeruzalem (2007), Israeli film directed by Doron Paz and Yoav Paz

== See also ==
- Jerusalem (disambiguation)
- Yerushalmi (disambiguation)
- Al-Quds (disambiguation)
- Bayt al-Maqdis (disambiguation)
- Aleje Jerozolimskie (literally Jerusalem Avenues), a street in Warsaw, Poland
- East Jerusalem
- West Jerusalem
- Eyerusalem, given name
