= Persianate society =

Society strongly influenced by Persian culture

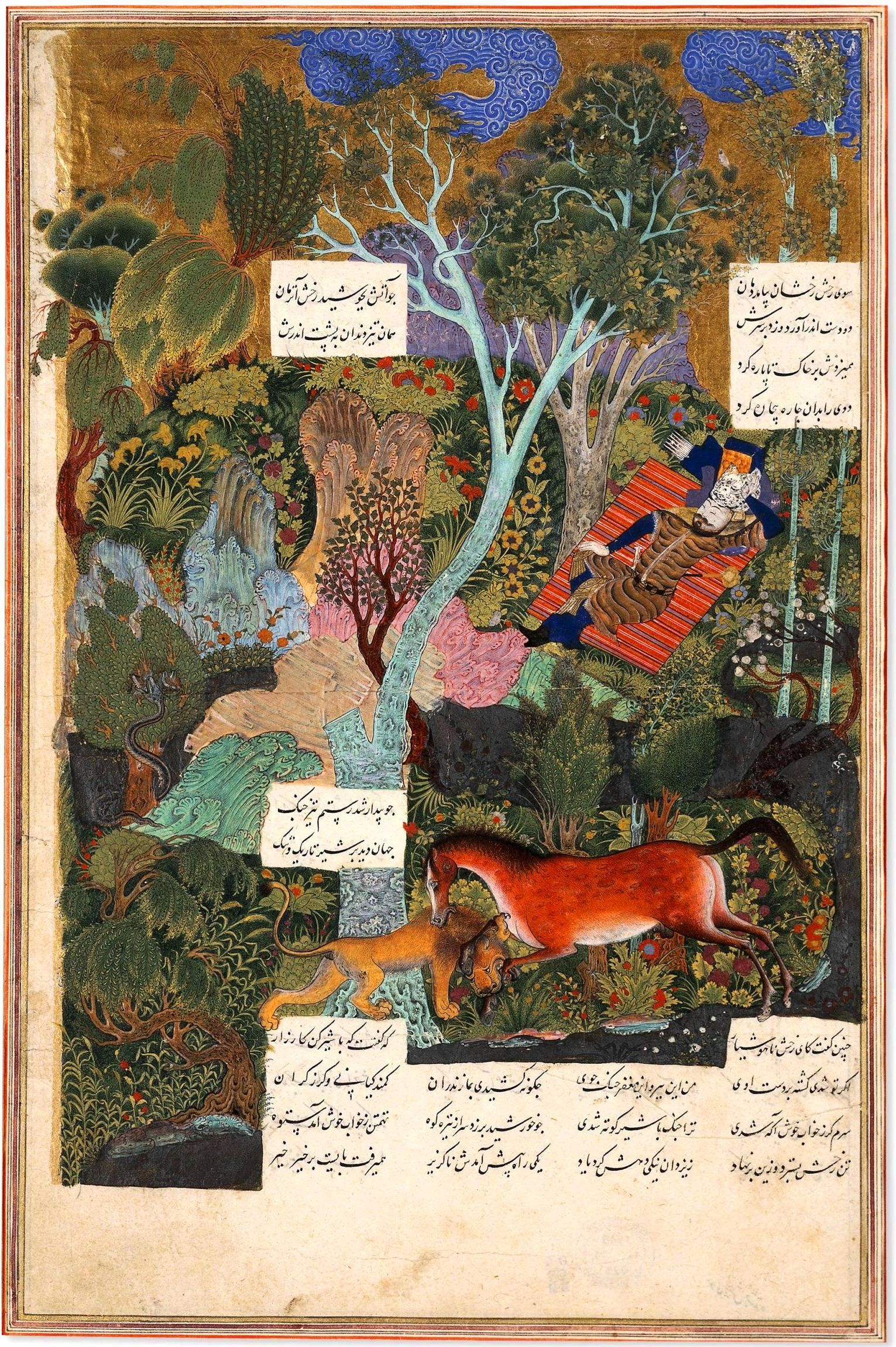
Persian miniature from the Shahnameh of Shah Tahmasp: Rustam asleep, while his horse Rakhsh slays a lion, fol. 118r.

A Persianate society is a society that is based on or strongly influenced by the Persian language, culture, literature, art or identity.

The term Persianate is a neologism credited to Marshall Hodgson. In his 1974 book, The Venture of Islam: The expansion of Islam in the Middle Periods, he defined it thus:

The rise of Persian had more than purely literary consequences: it served to carry a new overall cultural orientation within Islamdom.... Most of the more local languages of high culture that later emerged among Muslims... depended upon Persian wholly or in part for their prime literary inspiration. We may call all these cultural traditions, carried in Persian or reflecting Persian inspiration, 'Persianate' by extension. (Note: Hodgson says, "It could even be said that Islamicate civilization, historically, is divisible in the more central areas into an earlier 'caliphal' and a later 'Persianate' phase; with variants in the outlying regions—Maghrib, Sudanic lands, Southern Seas, India,... (p. 294)")

The term designates ethnic Persians but also societies that may not have been predominantly ethnically Persian but whose linguistic, tangible or intangible cultural practices were influenced by or based on Persianate culture. Examples of pre-19th-century Persianate societies were the Seljuq, Timurid, Mughal, and Ottoman dynasties.

== Geographical spread ==
Persianate culture flourished for nearly fourteen centuries. It was the combination of Persian culture and the Islamic religion that eventually underwent Persification and became the dominant culture of the ruling and elite classes of Greater Iran, Asia Minor, and South Asia.

When the peoples of Greater Iran were conquered by Islamic forces in the 7th and 8th centuries, they became part of an empire much larger than any previous one under Persian rule. While the Islamic conquest led to the Arabization of language and culture in the former Byzantine territories, this did not happen in Persia. Rather, the new "Islamic" culture evolving there was based on pre-Islamic Persian traditions of the area under the newly introduced Islamic worldview.

Persianate culture, especially among the elite classes, spread across the Muslim territories in west, central, and south Asia, although populations across this vast region had conflicting allegiances (sectarian, local, tribal, and ethnic) and spoke many different languages. It was spread by poets, artists, architects, artisans, jurists, and scholars, who maintained relations among their peers in the far-flung cities of the Persianate world, from Anatolia to India.

In the 16th century, Persianate culture became sharply distinct from the western part of the Islamicate World, the dividing zone falling along the Euphrates. Socially the Persianate world was marked by a system of ethnologically defined elite statuses: the rulers and their soldiery were non-Iranians in origin, but the administrative cadres and literati were Iranians. Cultural affairs were marked by a characteristic pattern of language use: New Persian was the language of state affairs, scholarship and literature, and Arabic the language of religion.

== History ==
=== Initial origins ===
After the Arab Muslim conquest of Iran, Pahlavi, the language of Pre-Islamic Iran, continued to be widely used well into the second Islamic century (8th century) as a medium of administration in the eastern lands of the Caliphate. Despite the Islamization of public affairs, the Iranians retained much of their pre-Islamic outlook and way of life, adjusted to fit the demands of Islam. Towards the end of the 7th century, the population began resenting the cost of sustaining the Arab caliphs, the Umayyads, and in the 8th century, a general Iranian uprising—led by Abu Muslim Khorrasani—brought another Arab family, the Abbasids, to the Caliph's throne.

Under the Abbasids, the capital shifted from Syria to Iraq, which had once been part of the Sasanian Empire and was still considered to be part of the Iranian cultural domain. Persian culture, and the customs of the Persian Barmakid viziers, became the style of the ruling elite. Politically, the Abbasids soon started losing their control over Iranians. The governors of Khurasan, the Tahirids, though appointed by the caliph, were effectively independent. When the Persian Saffarids from Sistan freed the eastern lands, the Buyyids, the Ziyarids and the Samanids in Western Iran, Mazandaran and the north-east respectively, declared their independence.

The separation of the eastern territories from Baghdad was expressed in a distinctive Persianate culture that became dominant in west, central, and south Asia, and was the source of innovations elsewhere in the Islamic world. The Persianate culture was marked by the use of the New Persian language as a medium of administration and intellectual discourse, by the rise of Persianised-Turks to military control, by the new political importance of non-Arab ulama and by the development of an ethnically composite Islamic society.

Pahlavi was the lingua franca of the Sasanian Empire before the Arab invasion, but towards the end of the 7th and the beginning of the 8th century Arabic became a medium of literary expression. In the 9th century, a New Persian language emerged as the idiom of administration and literature. The Tahirid and Saffarid dynasties continued using Persian as an informal language, although for them Arabic was the "language for recording anything worthwhile, from poetry to science", but the Samanids made Persian a language of learning and formal discourse. The language that appeared in the 9th and 10th centuries was a new form of Persian, derivative of the Middle-Persian of pre-Islamic times, but enriched by Arabic vocabulary and written in the Arabic script.

The Persian language, according to Marshall Hodgson in his The Venture of Islam, was to form the chief model for the rise of still other languages to the literary level. Like Turkish, most of the more local languages of high culture that later emerged among Muslims were heavily influenced by Persian (Urdu being a prime example). One may call these traditions, carried in Persian or reflecting Persian inspiration, ‘Persianate’ by extension. This seems to be the origin of the term Persianate.

Persianate culture involved modes of consciousness, ethos, and religious practices that have persisted in the Iranian world against hegemonic Arab Muslim (Sunni) cultural constructs. This formed a calcified Persianate structure of thought and experience of the sacred, entrenched for generations, which later informed history, historical memory, and identity among Alid loyalists and heterodox groups labeled by sharia-minded authorities as ghulāt. In a way, along with investing the notion of heteroglossia, Persianate culture embodies the Iranian past and ways in which this past blended with the Islamic present or became transmuted. The historical change was largely on the basis of a binary model: a struggle between the religious landscapes of late Iranian antiquity and a monotheist paradigm provided by the new religion, Islam.

This duality is symbolically expressed in the Shiite tradition that Husayn ibn Ali, the third Shi'ite Imam, had married Shahrbanu, daughter of Yazdegerd III, the last Sasanian king of Iran. This genealogy makes the later imams, descended from Husayn and Shahrbanu, the inheritors of both the Islamic Prophet Muhammad and of the pre-Islamic Sasanian kings.

=== West Asia ===
==== Samanids ====
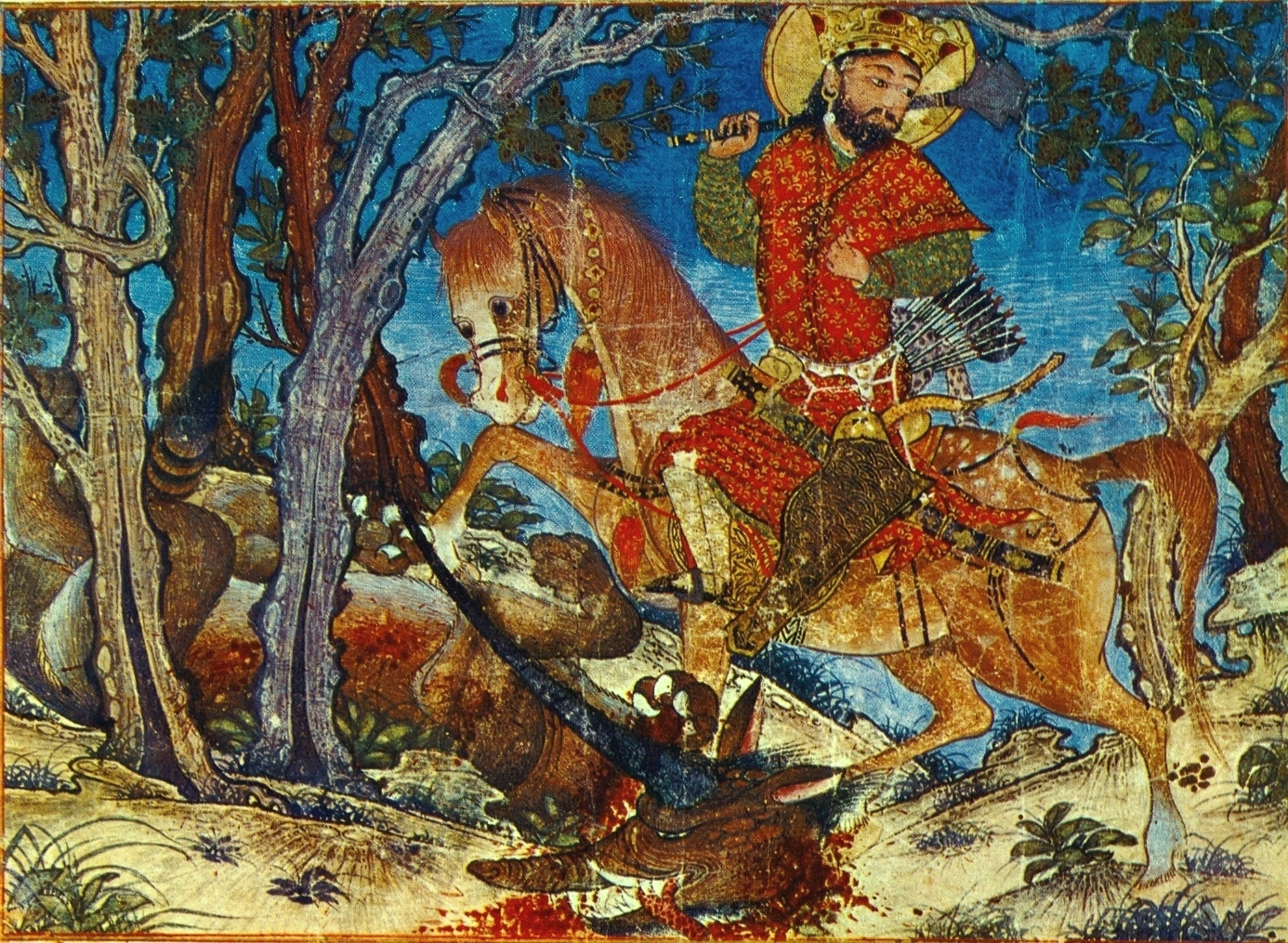
Great Mongol Shahnameh, 1330s, Bahram Gur killing a wolf, Harvard University Art Museum

The Iranian dynasty of the Samanids began recording its court affairs in Persian as well as Arabic, and the earliest great poetry in New Persian was written for the Samanid court. The Samanids encouraged translation of religious works from Arabic into Persian. In addition, the learned authorities of Islam, the ulama, began using the Persian lingua franca in public. The crowning literary achievement in the early New Persian language was the Shahnameh (Book of Kings), presented by its author Ferdowsi to the court of Mahmud of Ghazni (998–1030). This was a kind of Iranian nationalistic resurrection: Ferdowsi galvanized Persian nationalistic sentiment by invoking pre-Islamic Persian heroic imagery and enshrined in literary form the most treasured folk stories.

The Persianate culture that emerged under the Samanids in Greater Khorasan, in northeast Persia and the borderlands of Turkistan exposed the Turks to Persianate culture; The incorporation of the Turks into the main body of West Asian Islamic civilization, which was followed by the Ghaznavids, thus began in Khorasan; "not only did the inhabitants of Khurasan not succumb to the language of the nomadic invaders, but they imposed their own tongue on them. The region could even assimilate the Turkic Ghaznavids and Seljuks (11th and 12th centuries), the Timurids (14th and 15th centuries), and the Qajars (19th and 20th centuries).

==== Ghaznavids and Seljuqs ====
The Ghaznavids, the rivals and future successors of the Samanids, ruled over the southeastern extremities of Samanid territories from the city of Ghazni. Persian scholars and artists flocked to their court, and the Ghaznavids became patrons of Persianate culture. The Ghaznavids took with them Persianate culture as they subjugated West and South Asia. Apart from Ferdowsi, Rumi, Abu Ali Sina, Al-Biruni, Unsuri Balkhi, Farrukhi Sistani, Sanayi Ghaznawi and Abu Sahl Testari were among the great Iranian scientists and poets of the period under Ghaznavid patronage.

Persianate culture was carried by successive dynasties into West and South Asia, particularly by the Persianized Seljuqs (1040–1118) and their successor states, who presided over Iran, Syria, and Anatolia until the 13th century, and by the Ghaznavids, who in the same period dominated Greater Khorasan and parts of India. These two dynasties together drew the centers of the Islamic world eastward. The institutions stabilized Islamic society into a form that would persist, at least in West Asia, until the 20th century.

The Ghaznavids moved their capital from Ghazni to Lahore in modern Pakistan, which they turned into another center of Islamic culture. Under their patronage, poets and scholars from Kashgar, Bukhara, Samarkand, Baghdad, Nishapur, Amol and Ghazni congregated in Lahore. Thus, Persian language and Persianate culture was brought deep into India and carried further in the 13th century. The Seljuqs won a decisive victory over the Ghaznavids and swept into Khorasan; they brought Persianate culture westward into western Persia, Iraq, Anatolia, and Syria. Iran proper along with Central Asia became the heartland of Persian language and culture.

As the Seljuqs came to dominate West Asia, their courts were Persianized as far west as the Mediterranean Sea. Under their rule, many pre-Islamic Iranian traditional arts like Sasanian architecture were resurrected, and great Iranian scholars were patronized. Simultaneously, Islamic religious institutions became more organized and Sunni orthodoxy became more codified.

The Persian jurist and theologian Al-Ghazali was among the scholars at the Seljuq court who proposed a synthesis of Sufism and Sharia, which became the basis for a richer Islamic theology. Formulating the Sunni concept of division between temporal and religious authorities, he provided a theological basis for the existence of the Sultanate, a temporal office alongside the Caliphate, which at that time was merely a religious office. The main institutional means of establishing a consensus of the ulama on these dogmatic issues were the Nezamiyyas, madrasas named after their founder Nizam al-Mulk, a Persian vizier of the Seljuqs. These schools became the means of uniting Sunni ulama, who legitimized the rule of the Sultans. The bureaucracies were staffed by graduates of the madrasas, so both the ulama and the bureaucracies were under the influence of esteemed professors at the madrasas.

==== Safavids and the resurrection of Iranianhood in West Asia ====
The Safavid dynasty ascended to predominance in Iran in the 16th century—the first native Iranian dynasty since the Buyyids. The Safavids, who were of mixed Kurdish, Turkic, Georgian, Circassian and Pontic Greek ancestry, moved to the Ardabil region in the 11th century. They re-asserted Persian identity over many parts of West and Central Asia, establishing an independent Persian state, and patronizing Persian culture They made Iran the spiritual bastion of Shi’ism against the onslaughts of orthodox Sunni Islam, and a repository of Persian cultural traditions and self-awareness of Persian identity.

The founder of the dynasty, Shah Isma'il, adopted the title of Persian Emperor Pādišah-ī Īrān, with its implicit notion of an Iranian state stretching from Afghanistan as far as the Euphrates and the North Caucasus, and from the Oxus to the southern territories of the Persian Gulf. Shah Isma'il's successors went further and adopted the title of Shāhanshāh (king of kings). The Safavid shahs considered themselves, like their predecessors the Sasanian emperors, the khudāygān (the shadow of God on earth). They revived Sasanian architecture, built grand mosques and elegant charbagh gardens, collected books (one Safavid ruler had a library of 3,000 volumes), and patronized "Men of the Pen" The Safavids introduced Shiism into Persia to distinguish Persian society from the Ottomans, their Sunni archrivals to the west.

==== Ottomans ====
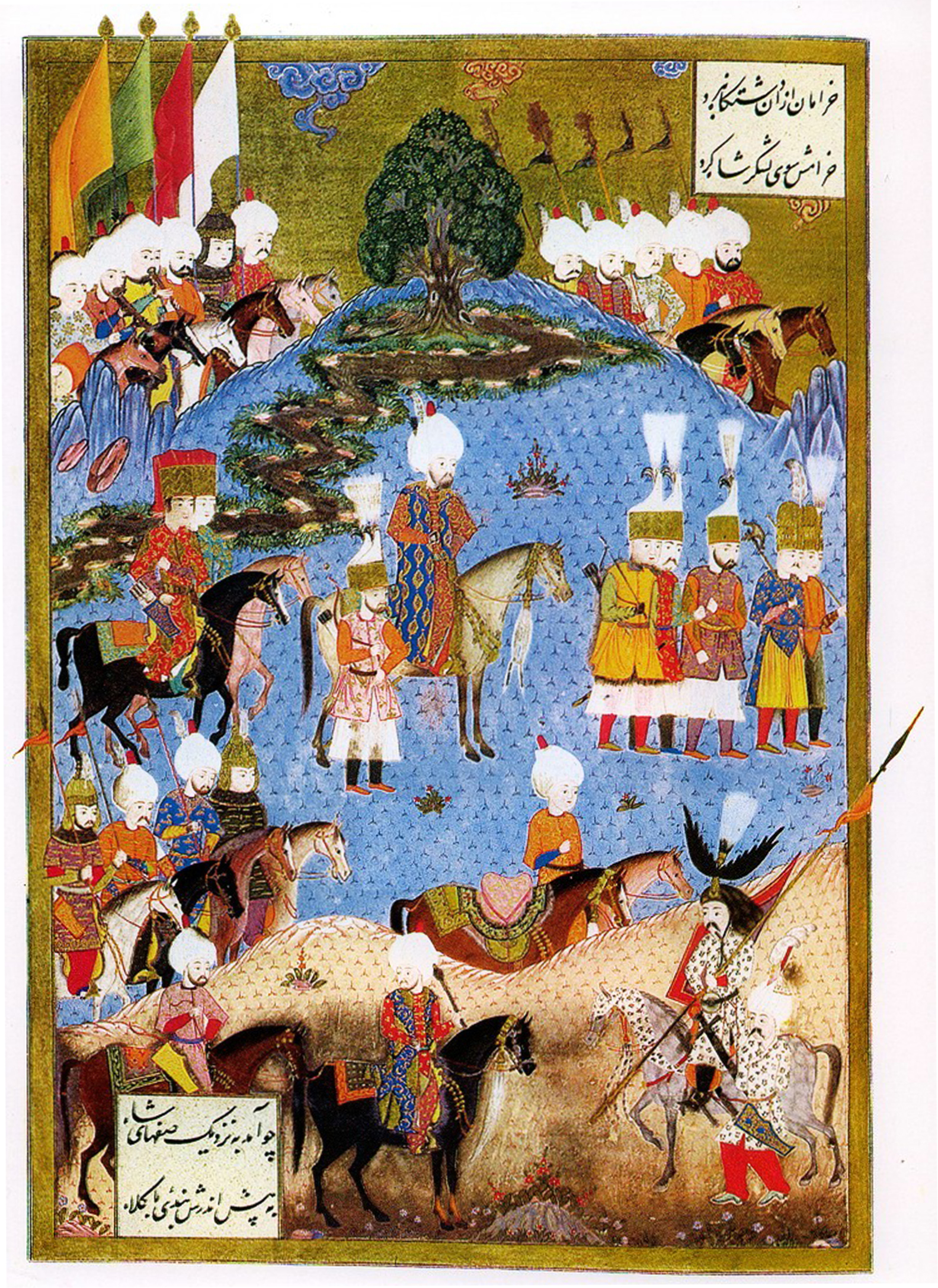
The Ottoman Süleymanname (The Book of Suleyman) manuscript of Celebi, in Shirazi style with Persian Texts

At the beginning of the 14th century, the Ottomans rose to predominance in Asia Minor. The Ottomans patronized Persian literature for five and a half centuries and attracted great numbers of writers and artists, especially in the 16th century. The Ottoman Empire's undeniable affiliation with the Persianate world during the first few decades of the sixteenth century are illustrated by the works of a scribe from the Aq Qoyunlu court, Edris Bedlisi. One of the most renowned Persian poets in the Ottoman court was Fethullah Arifi Çelebi, also a painter and historian, and the author of the Süleymanname (or Suleyman-nama), a biography of Süleyman the Magnificent. At the end of the 17th century, they gave up Persian as the court and administrative language, using Turkish instead; a decision that shocked the highly Persianized Mughals in India. The Ottoman Sultan Suleyman wrote an entire divan in Persian language. According to Hodgson:

The rise of Persian (the language) had more than purely literary consequence: it served to carry a new overall cultural orientation within Islamdom. Henceforth while Arabic held its own as the primary language of the religious disciplines and even, largely, of natural science and philosophy, Persian became, in an increasingly part of Islamdom, the language of polite culture; it even invaded the realm of scholarship with increasing effects. It was to form the chief model of the rise of still other languages. Gradually a third "classical" tongue emerged, Turkish, whose literature was based on Persian tradition.

—

Toynbee's assessment of the role of the Persian language is worth quoting in more detail, from A Study of History:

In the Iranian world, before it began to succumb to the process of Westernization, the New Persian language, which had been fashioned into literary form in mighty works of art...gained a currency as a lingua franca; and at its widest, about the turn of the sixteenth and seventeenth centuries of the Christian Era, its range in this role extended, without a break, across the face of South-Eastern Europe and South-Western Asia from the Ottoman pashalyq of Buda, which had been erected out of the wreckage of the Western Christian Kingdom of Hungary after the Ottoman victory at Mohacz in A.D. 1526, to the Muslim "successor-states" which had been carved, after the victory of the Deccanese Muslim princes at Talikota in A.D. 1565, out of the carcass of the slaughtered Hindu Empire of Vijayanagar. For this vast cultural empire the New Persian language was indebted to the arms of Turkish-speaking empire-builders, reared in the Iranian tradition and therefore captivated by the spell of the New Persian literature, whose military and political destiny it had been to provide one universal state for Orthodox Christendom in the shape of the Ottoman Empire and another for the Hindu World in the shape of the Timurid Mughal Raj. These two universal states of Iranian construction on Orthodox Christian and on Hindu ground were duly annexed, in accordance with their builders' own cultural affinities, to the original domain of the New Persian language in the homelands of the Iranian Civilization on the Iranian plateau and in the Basin of the Oxus and the Jaxartes; and in the heyday of the Mughal, Safawi, and Ottoman regimes New Persian was being patronized as the language of literae humaniores by the ruling element over the whole of this huge realm, while it was also being employed as the official language of administration in those two-thirds of its realm that lay within the Safawi and the Mughal frontiers.

—

E. J. W. Gibb is the author of the standard A Literary History of Ottoman Poetry in six volumes, whose name has lived on in an important series of publications of Arabic, Persian, and Turkish texts, the Gibb Memorial Series. Gibb classifies Ottoman poetry between the "Old School", from the 14th century to about the middle of the 19th century, during which time Persian influence was dominant; and the "Modern School", which came into being as a result of the Western impact. According to Gibb in the introduction (Volume I):

the Turks very early appropriated the entire Persian literary system down to its minute detail, and that in the same unquestioning and wholehearted fashion in which they had already accepted Islam.

The Saljuqs had, in the words of the same author:

attained a very considerable degree of culture, thanks entirely to Persian tutorage. About the middle of the eleventh century they [that is, the Saljuqs] had overrun Persia, when, as so often happened, the Barbarian conquerors adopted the culture of their civilized subjects. Rapidly the Seljuq Turks pushed their conquest westward, ever carrying with them Persian culture...[s]o, when some hundred and fifty years later Sulayman's son [the leader of the Ottomans]... penetrated into Asia Minor, they [the Ottomans] found that although Seljuq Turkish was the everyday speech of the people, Persian was the language of the court, while Persian literature and Persian culture reigned supreme. It is to the Seljuqs with whom they were thus fused, that the Ottomans, strictly so called, owe their literary education; this therefore was of necessity Persian as the Seljuqs knew no other. The Turks were not content with learning from the Persians how to express thought; they went to them to learn what to think and in what way to think. In practical matters, in the affairs of everyday life and in the business of government, they preferred their own ideas; but in the sphere of science and literature they went to school with the Persian, intent not merely on acquiring his method, but on entering into his spirit, thinking his thought and feeling his feelings. And in this school they continued so long as there was a master to teach them; for the step thus taken at the outset developed into a practice; it became the rule with the Turkish poets to look ever Persia-ward for guidance and to follow whatever fashion might prevail there. Thus it comes about that for centuries Ottoman poetry continued to reflect as in a glass the several phases through which that of Persia passed...[s]o the first Ottoman poets, and their successors through many a generation, strove with all their strength to write what is little else than Persian poetry in Turkish words. But such was not consciously their aim; of national feeling in poetry they dreamed not; poetry was to them one and indivisible, the language in which it was written merely an unimportant accident.

=== South Asia ===
In general, from its earliest days, Persian culture was brought into the Indian Subcontinent (or South Asia) by various Persianised Turkic and Afghan dynasties. South Asian society was enriched by the influx of Persian-speaking and Islamic scholars, historians, architects, musicians, and other specialists of high Persianate culture who fled the Mongol devastation. The sultans of Delhi, who were of Turko-Afghan origin, modeled their lifestyles after the Persian upper classes. They patronized Persian literature and music, but became especially notable for their architecture, because their builders drew from Irano-Islamic architecture, combining it with Indian traditions to produce a profusion of mosques, palaces, and tombs unmatched in any other Islamic country. The speculative thought of the times at the Mughal court, as in other Persianate courts, leaned towards the eclectic gnostic dimension of Sufi Islam, having similarities with Hindu Vedantism, indigenous Bhakti and popular theosophy.

The Mughals, who were of Turco-Mongol descent, strengthened the Indo-Persian culture, in South Asia. For centuries, Iranian scholar-officials had immigrated to the region where their expertise in Persianate culture and administration secured them honored service within the Mughal Empire. Networks of learned masters and madrasas taught generations of young South Asian men Persian language and literature in addition to Islamic values and sciences. Furthermore, educational institutions such as Farangi Mahal and Delhi College developed innovative and integrated curricula for modernizing Persian-speaking South Asians. They cultivated Persian art, enticing to their courts artists and architects from Bukhara, Tabriz, Herat, Shiraz, and other cities of Greater Iran. The Taj Mahal and its Charbagh were commissioned by the Mughal emperor Shah Jahan for his Iranian bride.

Iranian poets, such as Sa’di, Hafez, Rumi and Nizami, who were great masters of Sufi mysticism from the Persianate world, were the favorite poets of the Mughals. Their works were present in Mughal libraries and counted among the emperors’ prized possessions, which they gave to each other; Akbar and Jahangir often quoted from them, signifying that they had imbibed them to a great extent. An autographed note of both Jahangir and Shah Jahan on a copy of Sa’di's Gulestān states that it was their most precious possession. A gift of a Gulestān was made by Shah Jahan to Jahanara Begum, an incident which is recorded by her with her signature. Shah Jahan also considered the same work worthy enough to be sent as a gift to the king of England in 1628, which is presently in the Chester Beatty Library, Dublin. The emperor often took out auguries from a copy of the diwan of Hafez belonging to his grandfather, Humayun. One such incident is recorded in his own handwriting in the margins of a copy of the diwan, presently in the Khuda Bakhsh Oriental Library, Patna. The court poets Naziri, 'Orfi Shirazi, Faizi, Abdul Rahim Khan-i-Khanan, Muhammad Zuhuri, Sanai, Qodsi Mashhadi, Taleb Amoli and Kalim Kashani were all masters imbued with a similar Sufi spirit, thus following the norms of any Persianate court. (Note: For the influence of Rumi's poetry on contemporary poetics, see Schimmel, The Triumphal Sun: 374.78; for Mughal poetry, see Ghani, A History of Persian Language and Literature; Rahman, Persian Literature; Hasan, Mughal Poetry; Abidi, .Tālib-I Āmulī; idem, .Qudsi Mashhadi.; Nabi Hadi, Talib-i Amuli; Browne, A Literary History, vol. IV: 241.67.)

The tendency towards Sufi mysticism through Persianate culture in Mughal court circles is also testified by the inventory of books that were kept in Akbar's library, and are especially mentioned by his historian, Abu'l Fazl, in the Ā’in-ī Akbarī. Some of the books that were read out continually to the emperor include the masnavis of Nizami, the works of Amir Khusrow, Sharaf Manayri and Jami, the Masnavi i-manavi of Rumi, the Jām-i Jam of Awhadi Maraghai, the Hakika o Sanā’i, the Qabusnameh of Keikavus, Sa’di's Gulestān and Būstān, and the diwans of Khaqani and Anvari.

This intellectual symmetry continued until the end of the 19th century, when a Persian newspaper, Miftah al-Zafar (1897), campaigned for the formation of Anjuman-i Ma’arif, an academy devoted to the strengthening of Persian language as a scientific language.

== Persianate cultural works ==
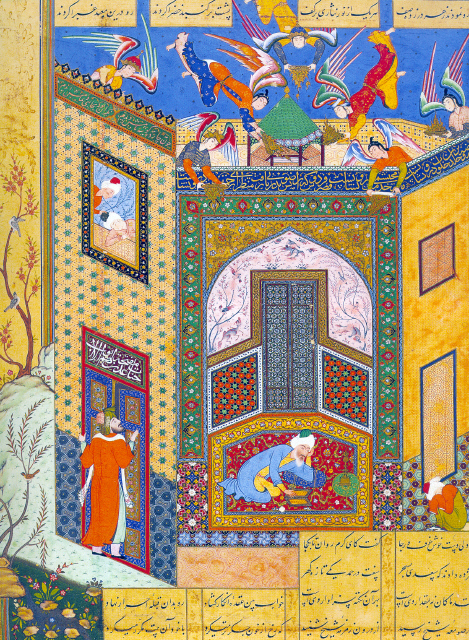
Illustration from Jami's Rose Garden of the Pious, dated 1553. The image blends Persian poetry and Persian miniature into one, as is the norm for many works of Persian literature.

=== Persian Sufi poetry ===
From about the 12th century, Persian lyric poetry was enriched with a spirituality and devotional depth. This development was due to the pervasive spread of mystical experience within Islam. Sufism developed in all Muslim lands, including the sphere of Persian cultural influence. As a counterpoise to the rigidity of formal Islamic theology and law, Islamic mysticism sought to approach the divine through acts of devotion and love rather than through mere rituals and observance. Love of God being the focus of the Sufis' religious sentiments, it was only natural for them to express it in lyrical terms, and Persian Sufis, often of exceptional sensibility and endowed with poetic verve, did not hesitate to do so.

The famous 11th-century Sufi, Abu Sa'id of Mehna frequently used his own love quatrains (as well as others) to express his spiritual yearnings, and with mystic poets such as Attar and Iraqi, mysticism became a legitimate, even fashionable subject of lyric poems among the Persianate societies. Furthermore, as Sufi orders and centers (Khaneghah) spread throughout Persian societies, Persian mystic poetic thought gradually became so much a part of common culture that even poets who did not share Sufi experiences ventured to express mystical ideas and imagery in their work.

==== Shahnameh's impact and affirmation of Persianate culture ====
Ferdowsi's Shahnameh enjoyed a special status in Iranian courtly culture as a historical narrative as well as a mythical one. The powerful effect that this text came to have on the poets of this period is partly due to the value that was attached to it as a legitimizing force, especially for new rulers in the Eastern Islamic world:

In the Persianate tradition the Shahnameh was viewed as more than literature. It was also a political treatise, as it addressed deeply rooted conceptions of honor, morality, and legitimacy. Illustrated versions of it were considered desirable as expressions of the aspirations and politics of ruling elites in the Iranian world.

As the result of the impacts of Persian literature as well as to further political ambitions, it became a custom for rulers in the Persianate lands to not only commission a copy of the Shahnameh, but also to have his own epic, allowing court poets to attempt to reach the level of Ferdowsi:

Thus, as with any piece of historical writing, the Shahnameh can be evaluated as a historical source on two levels: firstly, for its contribution to the store of basic factual knowledge of a period, and secondly, for the light it sheds, intentionally or otherwise, on contemporary thought and politics.

—

Iranian and Persianate poets received the Shahnameh and modeled themselves after it. Murtazavi formulates three categories of such works too: poets who took up material not covered in the epic, poets who eulogized their patrons and their ancestors in masnavi form for monetary reward, and poets who wrote poems for rulers who saw themselves as heroes in the Shahnameh, echoing the earlier Samanid trend of patronizing the Shahnameh for legitimizing texts.

First, Persian poets attempted to continue the chronology to a later period, such as the Zafarnamah of the Ilkhanid historian Hamdollah Mostowfi (d. 1334 or 1335), which deals with Iranian history from the Arab conquest to the Mongols and is longer than Ferdowsi's work. The literary value of these works must be considered on an individual basis as Jan Rypka cautions: "all these numerous epics cannot be assessed very highly, to say nothing of those works that were substantially (or literally) copies of Ferdowsi. There are however exceptions, such as the Zafar-Nameh of Hamdu'llah Mustaufi a historically valuable continuation of the Shah-nama" and the Shahanshahnamah (or Changiznamah) of Ahmad Tabrizi in 1337–38, which is a history of the Mongols written for Abu Sa'id.

Second, poets versified the history of a contemporary ruler for reward, such as the Ghazannameh written in 1361–62 by Nur al-Din ibn Shams al-Din. Third, heroes not treated in the Shahnameh and those having minor roles in it became the subjects of their own epics, such as the 11th-century Garshāspnāmeh by Asadi Tusi. This tradition, chiefly a Timurid one, resulted in the creation of Islamic epics of conquests as discussed by Marjan Molé. Also see the classification employed by Z. Safa for epics: milli (national, those inspired by Ferdowsi's epic), tarikhi (historical, those written in imitation of Nizami's Iskandarnamah) and dini for religious works. The other source of inspiration for Persianate culture was another Persian poet, Nizami, a most admired, illustrated and imitated writer of romantic masnavis.

Along with Ferdowsi's and Nizami's works, Amir Khusraw Dehlavi's khamseh came to enjoy tremendous prestige, and multiple copies of it were produced at Persianized courts. Seyller has a useful catalog of all known copies of this text.

== Legacy ==
As the broad cultural region remained politically divided, the sharp antagonisms between empires stimulated the appearance of variations of Persianate culture. After 1500, Iranian culture developed distinct features of its own, with interposition of strong pre-Islamic and Shiite Islamic culture. Iran's ancient cultural relationship with Southern Iraq (Sumer/Babylonia) remained strong and endured in spite of the loss of Mesopotamia to the Ottomans. Its ancient cultural and historical relationship with the Caucasus endured until the loss of Azerbaijan, Armenia, eastern Georgia and parts of the North Caucasus to Imperial Russia following the Russo-Persian Wars in the course of the 19th century. The culture of peoples of the eastern Mediterranean in Anatolia, Syria, and Egypt developed somewhat independently; India developed a vibrant and completely distinct South Asian style with little to no remnants of the once patronized Indo-Persian culture by the Mughals.

== List of historical Persianate states/dynasties ==
=== Western: Central Asia to West Asia ===
- Samanid Emirate (819–999) (Note: "Out of the wreckage of the Persianate Samanid empire of Khurasan and Transoxiana...")
- Saffarid Emirate (861–1003)
- Alavid Emirate (864–928)
- Sajid Emirate (889–929)
- Sallarid Emirate (919–1062)
- Ziyarid Emirate (931–1090)
- Ilyasid Emirate (932–968)
- Buyid Emirates (934–1062)
- Shaddadid Emirates (951–1199)
- Ravadid Emirate (955–1070/1116)
- Kakuyid Emirate (1008–1141)
- Seljuk Sultanate (1037–1194)
- Rum Sultanate (1077–1308)
- Khwarazmian Empire (1077–1231)
- Nizari Ismaili state (1090–1273)
- Kilis Emirate (1181–1610)
- Bitlis Emirate (1182–1847)
- Bingol Emirate (1231–1864)
- Hasankeyf Emirate (1232–1524)
- Soran Emirate (?–1514; 1816–1836)
- Shirvan Emirate (?–1840s)
- Mihrabanid Kingdom (1236–1537)
- Ilkhanate Iran (1256–1335)
- Ottoman Empire (1299–1922)
- Muzaffarid Kingdom (1314–1393)
- Jalairid Sultanate (1335–1432)
- Injuid Emirate (1335–1357)
- Sarbadar state (1337–1381)
- Chobanid Emirate (1338–1357)
- Afrasiyab Emirate (1349–1504)
- Marashiyan Emirate (1359–1596)
- Timurid Emirate (1370–1507)
- Qara Qoyunlu Confederation (1374–1468)
- Sufid Khanate (1361–1379)
- Aq Qoyunlu Confederation (1378–1503)
- Crimean Khanate (1441–1783)
- Kazakh Khanate (1465–1847)
- Siberian Khanate (1468–1598)
- Safavid Iran (1501–1736)
- Khiva Khanate (1511–1920)
- Afsharid Iran (1736–1796)
- Zand Iran (1751–1794)
- Qajar Iran (1789–1925)
- Pahlavi Iran (1925–1979)
- Islamic Republic of Iran (1980–present)

=== Eastern: Central Asia to South Asia ===
- Ushrusana (circa 600–892)
- Kara-Khanid Khanate (840–1212)
- Ghaznavid Sultanate (977–1186)
- Ghurid Sultanate (1011–1215)
- Delhi Sultanate (1207–1526)
- Chagatai Khanate (1226–1705)
- Kartid Sultanate (1244–1381)
- Kashmir Sultanate (1320–1589)
- Madurai Sultanate (1335–1378)
- Bahamani Kingdom (1347–1527)
- Sindh Sultanate (1351–1593)
- Bengal Sultanate (1352–1576)
- Palanpur (1370–1948)
- Khandesh Sultanate (1382–1601)
- Malwa Sultanate (1392–1562)
- Jaunpur Sultanate (1394–1479)
- Gujarat Sultanate (1394–1573)
- Langah Sultanate (1445–1540)
- Malerkotla (1454–1948)
- Berar Sultanate (1490–1572)
- Ahmadnagar Sultanate (1490–1636)
- Janjira (1489–1948)
- Bijapur Sultanate (1490–1686)
- Bidar Sultanate (1492–1619)
- Bukhara Khanate (1501–1785)
- Golconda Sultanate (1518–1687)
- Mughal Empire (1526–1857)
- Sur Empire (1538–1556)
- Kalat Khanate (1666–1955)
- Sindh Emirates (1701–1955)
- Bhopal (1708–1949)
- Hotak Kingdom (1709–1738)
- Carnatic Sultanate (1710–1855)
- Rohilkhand Kingdom (1721–1774)
- Hyderabad (1724–1948)
- Maimana Khanate (1747–1892)
- Radhanpur (1753–1948)
- Rampur (1774–1947)
- Junagadh (1730–1948)
- Oudh (1732–1856)
- Durrani Afghanistan (1747–1863)
- Bahawalpur (1748–1955)
- Mysore Kingdom (1761–1799)
- Bukhara Emirate (1785–1920)
- Sachin (1791–1948)
- Sikh Empire (1799–1849)
- Loharu (1803–1947)
- Tonk (1806–1949)
- Barakzai Afghanistan (1818–1973)
- Jammu and Kashmir (1846–1952)

== See also ==
- Iranian peoples
- Persianization
- Culture of Iran
- Persian traditional music
- Music of Iran

== Sources ==
- Amanat, Abbas (2019). "Remembering the Persianate". In Amanat, Abbas; Ashraf, Assef (eds.). The Persianate World: Rethinking a Shared Sphere. Brill. pp. 15–62. ISBN 978-90-04-38728-7.
- Arjomand, Saïd Amir (2025). Persianate Historical Sociology: Collected Essays. Brill. ISBN 978-9004742529.
