= Qudsi =

A Qudsi (also transliterated as Kudsi; Arabic: قدسي) is a Jerusalemite, especially a Palestinian one. It may also refer to:

== People ==
- Abbasgulu Bakikhanov, Azerbaijani writer known by the pen name Qüdsi
- Kudsi Erguner, Turkish musician
- Nazim al-Kudsi, Syrian politician
- Qodsi Mashhadi, Iranian poet
- Safwan al-Qudsi, Syrian politician

== Religion ==
- Hadith Qudsi

== See also ==
- Ghodsi
- Maqdisi
