= Ghodsi =

Ghodsi (Persian: قدسی, literally "sacred", "sacramental"; transcription from the Persian script of the adjective form of Ghods/Quds (Arabic: القدس), the corresponding transliteration from the Arabic script being Qudsi (lit. Jerusalemite, someone whose family originated from Jerusalem) is a Persian surname.

Notable people with the surname include:

- Ali Ghodsi, Swedish-Iranian computer scientist
- Gholamreza Ghodsi (1925–1989), Iranian belletrist and poet
- Mohammad Ghodsi, Iranian computer scientist and electrical engineer

== See also ==
- Ghodsi Mohammadi Ziarani
- Ghodsi Ghazi Noor
