= Yalu (disambiguation) =

The Yalu River forms part of the China-North Korea border.

Yalu may also refer to:

== Geography ==
- Yalu River (Nen River tributary), a river straddling the Chinese regions of Heilongjiang and Hulunbuir near the border with Russia
- Yalu, Iran, a village in Golestan Province, Iran
- Yalu, Mazandaran, a village in Mazandaran Province, Iran
- Yalu, Papua New Guinea, a large village in Morobe Province, Papua New Guinea
- Yalo, or Yalu, a village in Palestine, depopulated during the 1967 Arab-Israeli War

== Nature ==
- Common name for Terminalia grandiflora, a tree found in northern Australia

== Technology ==
- Yalu (iOS), a jailbreaking tool for iOS 10

== Games ==
- Yalu: The Chinese Counteroffensive in Korea, November 1950 to May 1951, a 1977 board wargame simulating a major battle during the Korean War
