= Maqdisi =

Maqdisi (Arabic: مقدسي) is an Arabic nisba referring to a Jerusalemite. It is derived from Bayt al-Maqdis, an Arabic name for Jerusalem, by way of the Hebrew Beit HaMikdash, the Temple in Jerusalem. Today, the common Arabic name of Jerusalem is al-Quds.

Al-Maqdisi (المقدسي) is surname the most commonly refer to Al-Maqdisi, a medieval Arab geographer born in Jerusalem.

It can also refer to a number of other people, including:

- Al-Maqdisi (949–991), Arab geographer
- Abd al-Ghani al-Maqdisi, classical Palestinian Sunni Islamic scholar
- Abu Muhammad al-Maqdisi, contemporary Jordanian-Palestinian Salafi Islamist scholar
- Diya al-Din al-Maqdisi, a Hanbali Islamic scholar
- Ibn Qudamah, Imam Mawaffaq ad-Din Abdullah Ibn Ahmad Ibn Qudama al-Maqdisi, a Hanbali Islamic scholar
- Ibn Tahir of Caesarea, Muslim historian and traditionist (c. 1057–1113)
- Kamel al-Budeiri, governor of Ramla district during the later Ottoman period
- Hisham Al-Saedni, known by the nom de guerre Abu al-Walid al-Maqdisi
- Srood Maqdasy, Assyrian politician from Iraq

== See also ==
- Qudsi (disambiguation)
- Muqaddas (disambiguation)
- Al-Quds (disambiguation)
- Arabic name
