= The Fall of Tobruk =

Board wargame

The Fall of Tobruk is a board wargame published by Conflict Games in 1975 that simulates the Second Battle of Tobruk during World War II.

== Background ==
After the British under Archibald Wavell had defeated the Italian 10th Army in Libya in 1940, Wavell was not allowed to continue the offensive to capture the port of Tripolitania. This allowed the Afrika Korps under Erwin Rommel to land, and the Germans went on the offensive. After defeating the British forces around the important port of Tobruk in 1941, forcing them to retreat to Egypt, Rommel attacked Tobruk itself.

== Description ==
The Fall of Tobruk is a two-player board wargame in which one player controls the Axis attackers, while the other player controls the British defenders. The victory condition is very simple: whoever controls Tobruk at the end of the game is the winner.

With over 350 die-cut counters and a large 19" x 25" mounted hex grid map, the game is moderately complex. Like many games of the period, Fall of Tobruk uses an alternating system of turns where the German player acts first, using three phases:

1. Reinforcement phase
2. Artillery fire phase
3. Movement/Combat phase: Unlike most wargames of the period where one player moves all units and then fires all units, the active player can move a unit and then use it to fire, before moving and firing another unit. This allows the player to exploit breakthroughs as they happen. If the active player uses antitank fire against an enemy tank, the tank can fire back.

Once the German player completes these phases, the British player is given the same opportunity. This completes one turn, which represents 24 hours of game time.

=== Victory conditions ===
The player in possession of Tobruk at the end of the game is the winner. If the German player takes Tobruk but the Allied player exits enough units to Egypt, the German victory is reduced to "marginal."

== Publication history ==
In 1975, Frank Chadwick designed The Fall of Tobruk, which was then published by Conflict Games. In 2004, Cool Stuff Unlimited published a revision of the game.

== Reception ==
In a 1976 poll conducted by Simulations Publications Inc. to determine the most popular board wargames in North America, The Fall of Tobruk placed 80th out of 202 games.

In Issue 23 of Moves (October–November 1975), Richard Berg noted that by coincidence, a number of wargames about Tobruk had been published at about the same time, but called The Fall of Tobruk "Possibly the best of the new Tobruk games." He thought the new play sequence "uniquely demonstrates the fluidity of desert warfare," and thought the game was "tense and tough." He concluded, "An intelligent and interested approach to the rules produces possibly the best game on this level and area. By all means, grab yourself a copy of this one."

In his 1977 book The Comprehensive Guide to Board Wargaming, Nick Palmer called Fall of Tobruk a "pleasant tactical game by the makers of Bar-Lev." Palmer found the combat system to be "fluid", and noted the importance of mines, and subsequently of engineers to remove the mines.

In Issue 35 of the British wargaming magazine Perfidious Albion, Pater Bartlam and Geoff Williams discussed the game. Bartlam commented, "Fall of Tobruk produces a realistic simulation of desert warfare without undue strain of the old grey matter [using] its subtle application of a few novel ideas." Williams replied, "This game has tried to give a taste of what the fighting was like in the desert and it has succeeded. All the major factors are here: antitank screens, the dreaded 88s, minefields, sappers, Matildas, Lee/Grants and much more." Bartlam concluded, "All in all, an entertaining game. The 'have some now – have some later' combat system is fun as it allows greater tactical freedom." Williams concluded, "Apart from a rulebook which has one or two ambiguities, Fall of Tobruk is quite an interesting game."

== Awards ==
- 1976 Origins Awards: Finalist for the Charles S. Roberts Award in the category "Best Professional Game of 1975".
- 2004 Charles S. Roberts Awards: Finalist in the category "Best Professional Game"

== Other reviews and commentary ==
- Fire & Movement #76
