= John Hill (game designer) =

American designer of military wargames

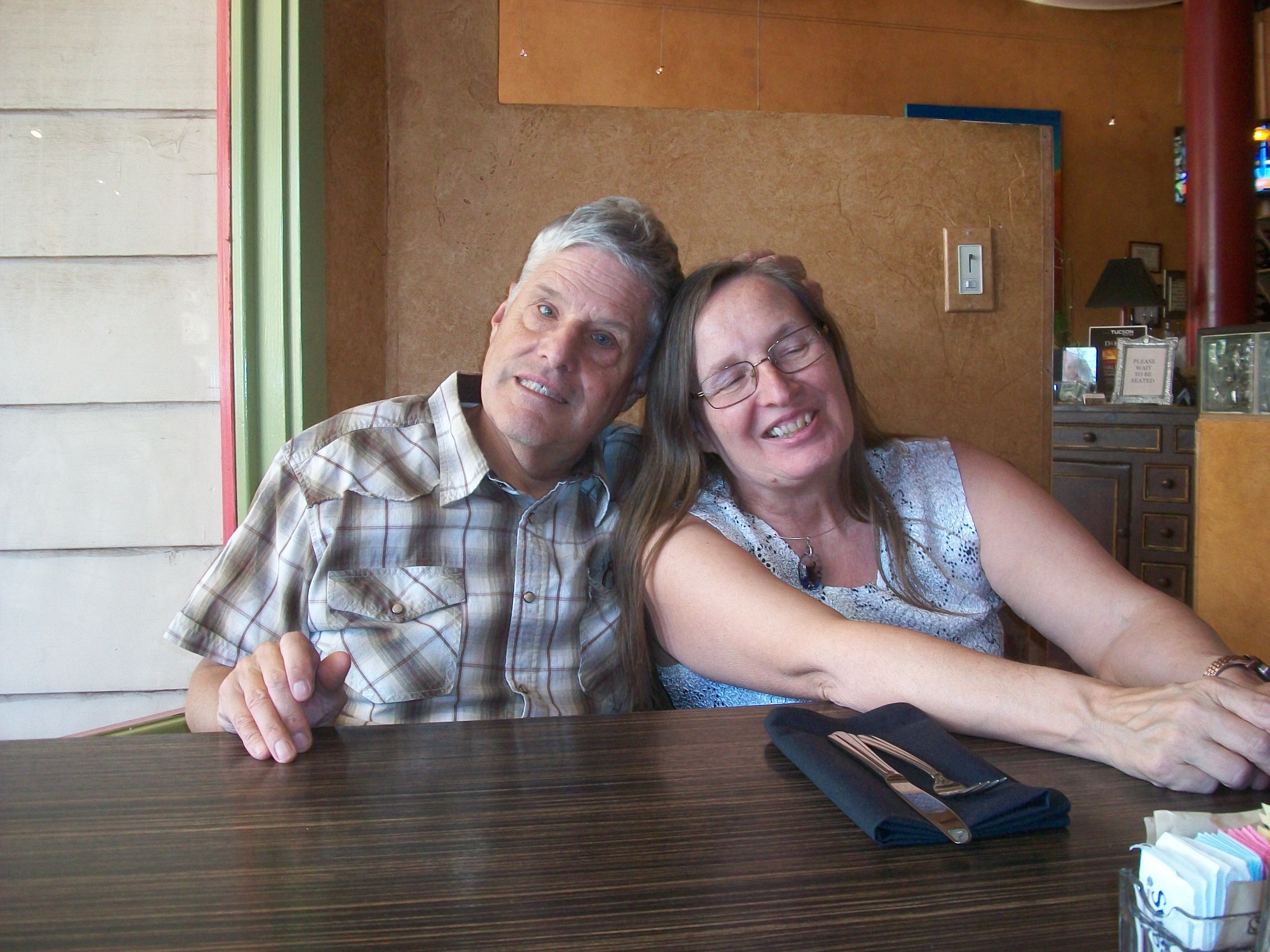
- John Hill with wife, Luella, 2012
- Born: John Evans Hill; February 21, 1945 Illinois, United States
- Died: January 12, 2015 (aged 69) Santa Fe, New Mexico, United States
- Occupation: game designer, military analyst
- Genre: Wargames, table-top gaming
- Spouse: Luella Burton

John Evans Hill (February 21, 1945 – January 12, 2015) was an American designer of military board wargames, as well as rules for miniature wargaming. He is best known as the designer of the Avalon Hill board game Squad Leader and the American Civil War miniatures game Johnny Reb. He was inducted into the Charles Roberts Awards Hall of Fame.

== Early life ==
Hill, as a child

John Evans Hill never knew his biological father, John T. Hill, who was killed in action during World War II while his mother Marian Jane Hill was pregnant. John Evans Hill was born on February 21, 1945, in Chicago and grew up in Elmhurst, Illinois. When Hill was three years old, his mother married Edward F. Whitley, who became the man Hill identified as his father. Hill also had a half-brother, Richard Whitley, a notable film and television writer. Hill was raised as a Catholic, attending and graduating from Immaculate Conception High School. After high school, Hill attended Purdue University and graduated with a four-year degree in Military History.

== Early career ==
John Hill founded the Conflict Games Company in the late 1960s and owned a hobby store, the Scale Model Shop, in Lafayette, Indiana, for several years. It has been reported the Scale Model Shop was lost in a flood.

== Conflict Games ==
Influenced by game designer Richard Berg, Hill decided to try his hand at designing games, and used his company Conflict Games as a publisher. In 1972, his first games included Kasserine Pass (World War II), Verdun: The Game of Attrition (World War I), and The Brotherhood (Criminal warfare). These were followed in 1973 by Overlord, based on the Normandy campaign of Operation Overlord.

The same year, Simulations Design Corporation (SDC), the publishers of the faltering Conflict magazine (not related to Hill's Conflict Games) asked Hill for a game that could be included in their next issue, and Hill sold them Battle for Hue, a game that simulated the Battle of Huế during the 1968 Tet Offensive of the Vietnam War. It appeared as a pull-out game in Issue 6 of Conflict. SDC republished Battle for Hue as a ziplock bag game in 1975.

In 1974 and 1975 Hill sold two more games to SDC about recent Arab-Israeli conflicts, Bar-Lev and Jerusalem.

In 1975, Conflict Games purchased a wargame from Frank Chadwick and published it as The Fall of Tobruk.

In 1977, with SDC out of business, Hill sold Yalu, a game set during the Korean War, to Game Designers' Workshop (GDW).

== Squad Leader ==
During this time, Hill had become interested in traditional miniatures wargaming, which did not use a hex grid map but required measurement of the actual physical distance between miniature soldiers. Although this had traditionally only been used for Napoleonic-era wargames, Hill developed a modern-day miniatures game with a World War II setting that used platoon-sized groups and their individual officers. He attempted to sell the new miniatures game to Avalon Hill. Although the game company was interested in the game's focus on the platoon, it convinced Hill to convert the game to a conventional hex grid map using standard cardboard counters. The result was 1977's Squad Leader, one of the most popular wargames ever produced.

Hill also worked on Cross of Iron, the first expansion module for Squad Leader, published in 1979.

Cover of SPI's Battle for Stalingrad, prominently displaying John Hill's name

By this time, Hill's reputation as a game designer was sufficiently high that when Simulations Publications, Inc. published his Battle for Stalingrad in 1980, his name appeared on the box cover. Likewise when Mayfair Games republished Battle for Hue (retitled simply Hue) in 1982, Hill's name was featured prominently on the box cover. This happened again when Eastern Front Tank Leader was published by West End Games in 1986.

== Johnny Reb ==
Hill sold Conflict Games in its entirety to Game Designers' Workshop (GDW), and he took up work as an advertising executive for Boynton & Associates, which published trade magazines for the hobby industry. He was still interested in creating a miniatures game system, and eventually developed a rules set for regimental-level American Civil War miniature gaming. This became the popular Johnny Reb game published by Game Designers' Workshop in 1983. They also published a second edition in 1988.

In person at Historical Miniatures Gaming Society conventions such as Historicon, Cold Wars and Fall In!, Hill was noted for his elaborate 10mm miniature wargaming layouts for Civil War battles. When GDW went out of business in 1996, Hill founded the Johnny Reb Gaming Company, and published a new and much-revised set of miniatures rules titled Johnny Reb III.

In 2014, he developed Across A Deadly Field, a new set of regimental rules for Civil War battles, as well as two supplements, The War in the East, and The War in the West.

Hill was a frequent contributor to the Johnny Reb Gaming Society's popular CHARGE! magazine, offering rules interpretations and strategy advice for Johnny Reb players.

== Awards and legacy ==
At the 1978 Origins Awards, Hill's game Squad Leader received a Charles S. Roberts Award in the category "Best Tactical Game of 1977".

The following year, at the 1979 Origins Awards, Hill was inducted into the Charles Roberts Awards Hall of Fame.

J P. Hunerwadel commented in 2001 that "John Hill's Squad Leader ... helped fuel the great board-war-game boom of the late seventies."

Johnny Reb was chosen for inclusion in the 2007 book Hobby Games: The 100 Best. Game designer Dana Lombardy commented, "John Hill's Civil War miniatures rules remain innovative, challenging, and lots of fun, a claim supported by the game's loyal fan support. Clubs still stage Johnny Reb sessions at conventions around the world, more than 20 years after the rules were introduced."

== Personal life ==
Hill married Luella Burton in 1969, and the couple raised a daughter. After spending many years in Northern Virginia, where he also served as a military analyst for the U.S. Government, Hill retired to New Mexico.

Hill died on January 12, 2015, at Christus St. Vincent Hospital in Santa Fe, New Mexico.
