= Kasserine Pass (wargame) =

World War II-themed board wargame

1st edition box, 1972

Kasserine Pass, in some editions subtitled "The Baptism of Fire", is a board wargame published by Conflict Games in 1972 that simulates the Battle of Kasserine Pass during the North African Campaign of 1942, when inexperienced American forces were attacked by the battle-hardened Afrika Korps under the command of Erwin Rommel. The game was the first created by noted game designer John Hill.

== Background ==
In late 1942, the Afrika Korps had been defeated by the British at the Second Battle of El Alamein and were retreating. An American force landed on the Tunisian coast in the path of the retreating Germans; Allied command hoped to catch the Germans in a pincer between the advancing British and the newly landed Americans. Deciding the best defense was a good offense, General Erwin Rommel decided to strike against the inexperienced Americans first, catching them in the area of the Kasserine Pass.

== Description ==
Kasserine Pass is a two-player wargame in which one player controls the German attackers, and the other player controls the American defenders.

=== Components ===
The game box includes:

- 25" x 21" paper hex grid map scaled at 4.5 mi (7 km) per hex
- 150 die-cut counters
- 4-page rulebook
- various charts and player aids

=== Gameplay ===
The game uses a traditional alternating "I Go, You Go" system:

1. Axis movement
2. Axis combat
3. Allied movement
4. Allied combat

Each turn marks one day of game time. The game lasts 12 turns.

=== Movement ===
Like most wargames of the 1970s, most attacking units have to stop once they enter an enemy unit's zone of control. However, in a unique twist, Kasserine Pass adds a movement cost to enter a zone of control, and if the attacking unit does not have enough movement left, it cannot enter. The cost to Axis units is +2 Movement Points, but the cost to Allied units is +4 Movement Points.

In addition, once German Panzers, Panzer Grenadiers and Recon units have paid the +2 Movement Point cost to enter an Allied zone of control, they can continue to move right through the zone of control using normal terrain movement costs. German units are also given several other preferential combat and movement bonuses in recognition of their battle experience.

2nd edition box, 1977

=== Victory conditions ===
The Germans must take and hold 6 towns to win. The Allies win by preventing this.

== Publication history ==
Influenced by game designer Richard Berg, game store owner John Hill decided to try his hand at designing games, and used his company Conflict Games as a publisher. In 1972, his first game was Kasserine Pass. The game received good reviews, and a second edition with new box cover art was published in 1977.

== Reception ==
In the November 1974 edition of Airfix Magazine, Bruce Quarrie liked the high quality of the components, but thought the game itself was not unique, saying, "It is basically a tactical game at a fairly simple level, standard in its rules and fast moving." He concluded by questioning the relatively high price of the game in comparison with rival products.

In his 1977 book The Comprehensive Guide to Board Wargaming, Nicholas Palmer called the game a "fast-moving struggle in the mountains, with artillery playing a crucial role." He concluded that designer John Hill's "simple basic system makes it highly playable [and] evenly balanced."

In a paper examining the possible uses of wargames to aid in the study of World War II in the high school classroom, Martin Campion (Associate Professor of History, Kansas State College of Pittsburg) admitted that shorter games like Kasserine Pass that focus on a single battle "have less appeal for classroom use than games on larger subjects." Nevertheless, Campion found Kasserine Pass "a well-designed game on a minor part of the Tunisian campaign." Although he found that Kasserine Pass and its fellow game The Fall of Tobruk (Conflict Games, 1975) "have limited usefulness as in-class games," he concluded that they "are representations of their subjects that make good take-home assignments."

In the inaugural edition of Phoenix, Peter Bolton called Kasserine Pass and its sister game Overlord (another John Hill game, published in 1973) "clean, highly enjoyable games [where] victory conditions can go either way. Of the two, Kasserine is perhaps better, particularly when played as a competition game." Bolton assured players that although on paper the Germans seemed to have an overwhelming advantage, "after two or three games it becomes apparent that the Allies are not just around as whipping boys."

== Other reviews and commentary ==
- Strategy & Tactics #40
- Fire & Movement #10, #13 and #60
- Campaign #74
- Panzerfaust #60
- Phoenix #4
- Simulacrum #29
- Conflict #6
- Panzerfaust and Campaign #74
