= Fleeting Days =

Studio album by Dan Bern & The IJBC
- Released: March 4, 2003
- Genre: Folk rock
- Length: 44:57
- Label: Messenger Records

Dan Bern & The IJBC chronology
The Swastika EP (2002)	Fleeting Days (2003)	My Country II (2004)

Professional ratings
Review scores
Source	Rating
AllMusic	3/5 stars
Entertainment Weekly	B
Robert Christgau	(1-star Honorable Mention)

Fleeting Days is a 2003 folk rock album by Dan Bern and the International Jewish Banking Conspiracy. While much of Bern's music is heavily influenced by Bob Dylan, and "Bern sings like he's making fun of Dylan even when he isn't", Fleeting Days is also influenced by the style of Elvis Costello and Bruce Springsteen. Its songs are more modest and toned down compared to earlier albums, but Dan Bern's quirky lyrics and imagery remain.

== Track listing ==
1. "Baby Bye Bye" – 3:06
2. "Eva" – 3:46
3. "Superman" – 3:58
4. "Closer to You" – 7:00
5. "I Need You" – 4:16
6. "Chain Around My Neck" – 2:32
7. "Jane" – 2:36
8. "Crow" – 2:31
9. "Don't Make Me Leave" – 3:43
10. "City" – 3:38
11. "Fly Away" – 6:46
12. "Graceland" – 5:00
13. "Soul" – 4:25
