= Yerushalmi =

Yerushalmi literally means "something from Jerusalem, in particular, a person who lives in Jerusalem, a Jerusalemite. It may also refer to:

- Jerusalem Talmud (Talmud Yerushalmi, often Yerushalmi for short)
- Meurav Yerushalmi (Jerusalem Mixed Grill)
- Yerushalmi Kugel, a noodle casserole developed by the Ashkenazi community in Jerusalem
- Yifat Tomer-Yerushalmi, an officer of the Israel Defense Forces
- Targum Yerushalmi
- Targum Pseudo-Jonathan (Targum Yerushalmi)
- Yerushalmi (surname)

== See also ==
- Jerusalem (disambiguation)
