= New American Language =

Studio album by Dan Bern
- Released: October 9, 2001
- Genre: Folk rock
- Length: 59:19
- Label: Messenger, Cooking Vinyl
- Producer: Wil Masisak, Colin Mahoney, Chuck Plotkin, Brian Schey

Dan Bern chronology
Smartie Mine (1999)	New American Language (2001)	World Cup (2002)

Professional ratings
Review scores
Source	Rating
AllMusic	3/5 stars
Dayton Daily News	B
Des Moines Register	4/5 stars

New American Language is Iowa native singer/songwriter Dan Bern's first release with Messenger Records.

== Track listing ==
Unless otherwise noted, all tracks by Dan Bern

1. "Sweetness" – 3:53
2. "New American Language" – 5:12
3. "Alaska Highway" – 4:05
4. "God Said No" – 5:31
5. "Turning Over" – 5:10
6. "Black Tornado" – 5:24
7. "Albuquerque Lullaby" – 3:54
8. "Tape" – 3:37
9. "Honeydoo!" – 2:14
10. "Toledo" – 5:22
11. "Rice" – 5:30
12. "Thanksgiving Day Parade" – 10:27

== Personnel ==
- Dan Bern – Organ, Guitar, Harmonica, Cello, Vocals, Illustrations, Paintings
- Wil Masisak - Piano, Bass, Organ, Wurlitzer, Mellotron, Guitar, Clarinet, Glockenspiel, Vocals
- Eben Grace - Guitar, Banjo
- Brian Schey - Bass, Guitar, Vocals
- Spanky Mahoney - Drums
- Jake Coffin - Drums, Vocals
- Paul Kuhn - Cellocaster
- Lisa Donnelly - Vocals
- Randy Kaplan - Vocals
- Brent Berry & Clark Jamison - Percussion
- Scott Watson - Tuba
