= Smartie Mine =

Studio album by Dan Bern
- Released: March 9, 1999
- Genre: Folk rock
- Length: 136:43
- Label: Chartmaker
- Producer: Dan Bern, Wil Masisak

Dan Bern chronology
Fifty Eggs (1998)	Smartie Mine (1999)	New American Language (2001)

Professional ratings
Review scores
Source	Rating
AllMusic	3/5 stars
The Indianapolis Star	1/5 stars
The Montreal Gazette	2.5/5 stars
Rolling Stone	3/5 stars

Smartie Mine (1999) is Iowa native singer/songwriter Dan Bern's follow-up to Fifty Eggs.

== Track listing ==
Unless otherwise noted, all tracks by Dan Bern

1. "Smartie Mine" – 4:20
2. "One Thing Real" – 5:41
3. "Tiger Woods" – 3:07
4. "Chelsea Hotel" – 4:54
5. "City of Models" – 3:19
6. "Krautmeyer" – 3:55
7. "Crosses" – 5:18
8. "Colors" – 3:25
9. "Airplane Blues" (Sleepy John Estes, Lightnin' Hopkins) – 8:39
10. "Freight Train Blues" (McDowell) – 4:52
11. "Talkin' Woody, Bob, Bruce & Dan Blues" – 5:09
12. "Ballerina" – 6:40
13. "Simple" – 8:52
14. "Beautiful Trees" – 2:41
15. "Joe Van Gogh" – 4:15
16. "Little Russian Girl" – 3:39
17. "Gamblin' With My Love" (Pete Rose) – 5:36
18. "Murderer" – 4:51
19. "Alia" – 3:50
20. "Two-Month Affair" – 3:26
21. "Baby Love" (Wainwright) – 4:40
22. "Sculpter" – 4:56
23. "Dark Chocolate" – 3:42
24. "Decadent Town" – 4:28
25. "Hooker" – 7:32
26. "Cocaine Blues/Blue Jay Way" (Davis, George Harrison) – 6:29
27. "True Revolutionaries" – 8:27

== Personnel ==
- Dan Bern – Organ, Guitar, Harmonica, Cello, Vocals, Art Direction, Illustrations, Paintings
- Jarrod Kaplan – Drums, Djembe
- Tige DeCoster – Bass, Fretless Bass
- Wil Masisak – Keyboards, Vocals, Found Objects
- Martha Wainwright – Vocals (Lead Vocal on "Baby Love")
- Eben Grace – Electric Guitar (track 16) & Lap Steel (track 13)
