= Gholamreza Ghodsi =

Iranian poet

- Born: 23 September 1925; Mashhad, Iran
- Died: 11 December 1989 (aged 64); Mashhad, Iran
- Resting place: Azadi Courtyard of Imam Reza shrine, Mashhad
- Occupations: Poet, university professor
- Spouse: Farangis Taghipour
- Writing career
- Language: Persian

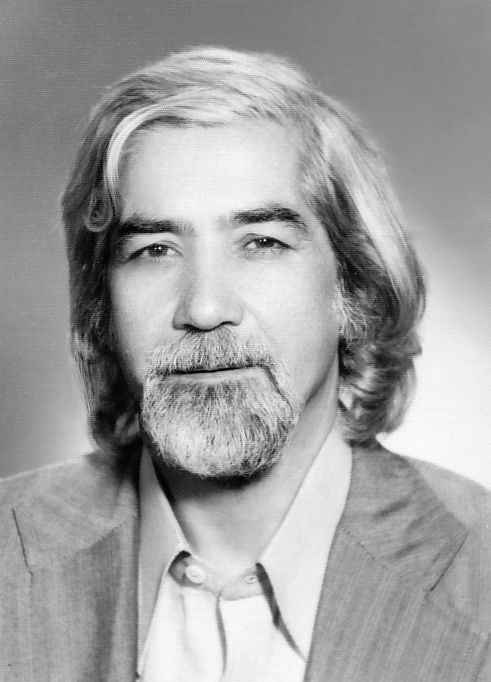
Gholamreza Ghodsi, 1980

Gholamreza Ghodsi (1925 – 11 December 1989) was a belletrist and poet from Mashhad, Iran.

== Early life and education ==
Ghodsi was born in 1925 in Mashhad, Iran. His genealogy goes back to Mirza Mohammad Jan Ghodsi Mashhadi, the celebrated poet of Safavid era who was the head of Astan Quds treasury and traveled there at the era of Shah Jahan which was the era of Persian poetry prosperity. After completing primary school, Ghodsi initiated Qadimeh studies. He learned Arabic literature, principles of Islamic jurisprudence and logic and philosophy from great scholars of Khorassan like Mohammad Taghi Adib Neyshabouri (Adib Dovom) and Hashem Ghazvini and then studied at Faculty of Theology at University of Mashhad.

He started poetry writing when he was sixteen years old. He wrote sonnets but he was interested in the Indian style and the themes of his poems were social and political.

== Career ==
Ghodsi founded "Ferdowsi Athenaeum" of Mashhad, with the aim of organizing the literary situation of his homeland. He founded this athenaeum with some of his friends in 1946.

He traveled to India for compiling poems of his great-grandfather Mirza Mohammad Jan Ghodsi Mashhadi and his goal was to gain other manuscripts of this poet.

Professor Ghodsi taught Persian and Arabic language and Literature at Ferdowsi University of Mashhad. He died on 11 December 1989 at the age of 64 and he was buried at block 168, in Azadi Courtyard of Imam Reza holy shrine in Mashhad.

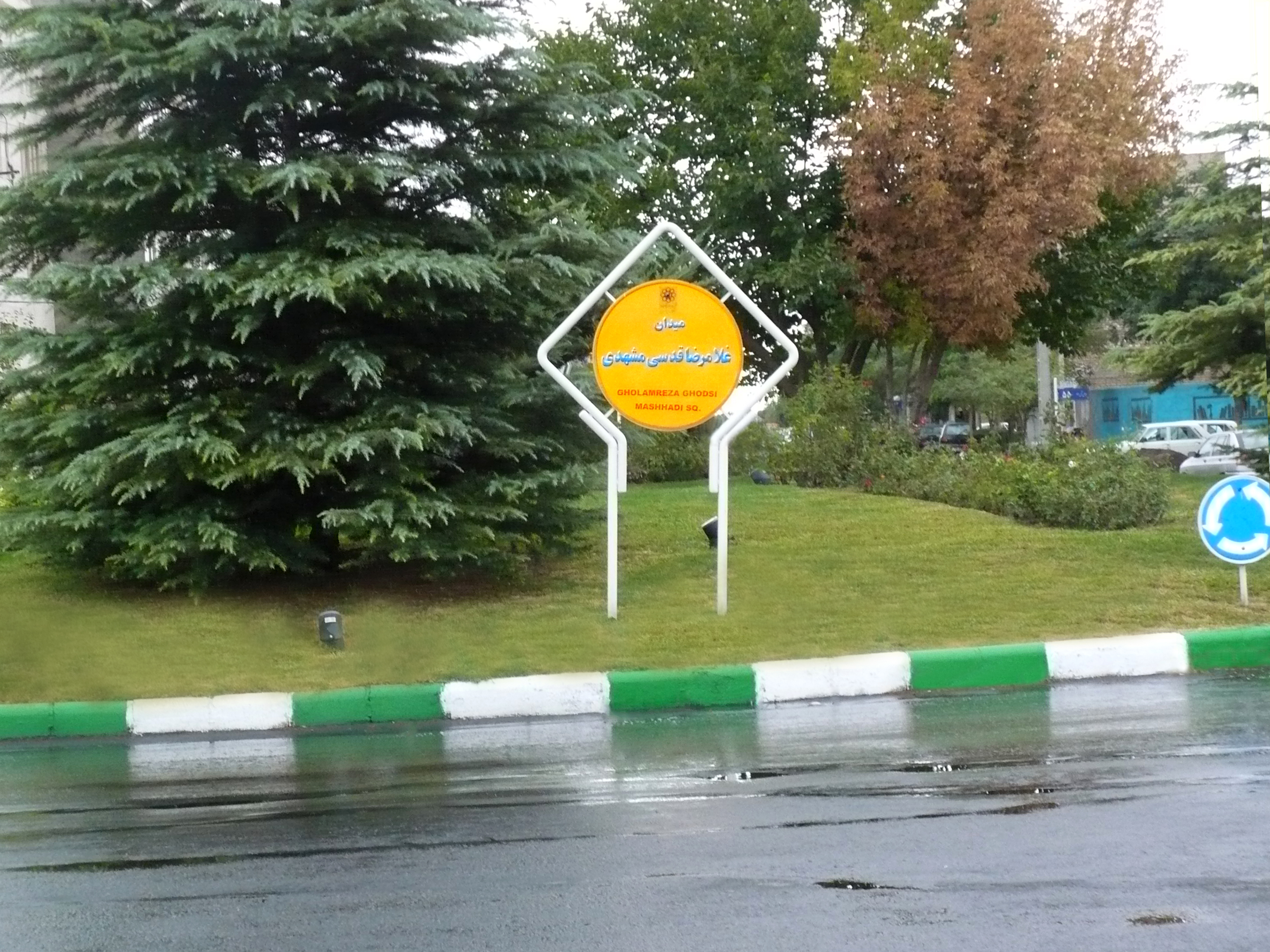
Gholamreza Ghodsi Sq.

== Poems ==
- "I wish I were..." (lyric of "Kash Bodam Lala کاش بودم لاله" performed by Ahmad Zahir)
- "Enough for us" (lyric of "Ma ra bas ما را بس" composed by Majid Derakhshani)

== Bibliography ==
- Diwan of Ghodsi, with introduction of Mehrdad Avesta, Golvajeh Toos publications, 2024.
- Diwan of Poems "Songs of Ghodsi", with introduction of Mehrdad Avesta, Culture and Guidance General Administration publications, 1991.
- "Collection of Poems", the book "a Breeze from the Region of Khorassan", 1991.
- "Collection of Poems", Iranian Contemporary Lyric, 1985.
- " Companions of the Prophet", about history of Islam, Besat publications, 1977.
- "Collection of Poems", the book "Contemporary Poetry in Khorassan", 1964.

== Resources ==
- Persian Literature I (part II), high school textbook, Curriculum and Textbooks Department Office
- Persian Literature III, humanities, high school textbook, Curriculum and Textbooks Department Office
- Bagherzadeh (Bagha), Ali, Twenty One Articles, Mashhad: Sokhan Gostar, 2008.
- Selected Texts of Persian Literature, university textbook, Nashr Daneshgahi publications, ISBN 978-964-01-1277-9.
- Selected Texts of Persian Literature, university textbook, Nashr Daneshgahi publications, ISBN 964-01-0805-7.
- Motavalli, Ahmadreza, "The Picked Flowers Smell", Khorassan daily, issue 14006, 8 December 1997.
