= Dan Bern =

American singer-songwriter

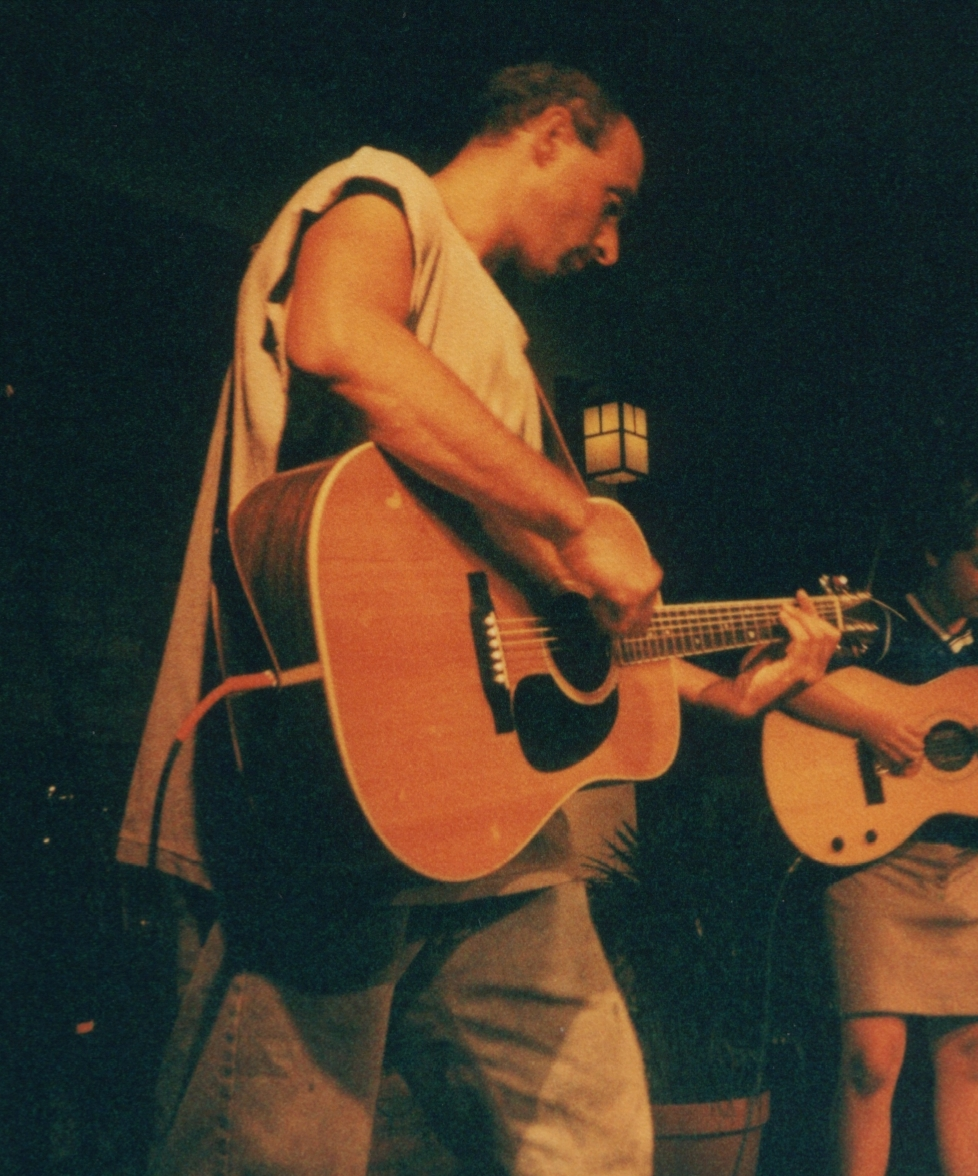
- Bern in August 1999.

Background information
- Also known as: Bernstein; Cunliffe Merriwether
- Born: Daniel Bern; July 27, 1965 (age 61); Mount Vernon, Iowa, U.S.
- Genres: Folk, rock, pop
- Occupations: Musician, songwriter, author, visual artist
- Instruments: Vocals, guitar, harmonica
- Years active: 1996-present
- Labels: Messenger, Cooking Vinyl, Work
- Website: danbern.com

Dan Bern (also known as Bernstein; born July 27, 1965) is an American guitarist, singer, songwriter, novelist, and painter. His music has been compared to that of Bob Dylan, Woody Guthrie, Bruce Springsteen, Phil Ochs and Elvis Costello.

He is a prolific composer, having written over one thousand songs. He wrote the novel Quitting Science (2004) under the pen name Cunliffe Merriwether and wrote the preface under his own name.

Bern describes his music as "[u]ndefinable by genre, crossing over and through folk, rock, singer-songwriter, and kids music" with sardonic, literary lyrics. He has toured with Ani DiFranco, The Who, and Roger Daltrey.

== Early life and education ==
Dan Bern was born in Mount Vernon, Iowa. He is of Lithuanian Jewish ancestry; on a trip to Lithuania, he learned Bernstein was his family's name before immigration to the United States.

Bern learned to play cello at age six, and the guitar at 14 or 16, after he heard his first Bob Dylan songs.

After college, he played seven open mics a week in Chicago and started to be invited to Chicago folk clubs such as The Earl of Old Town, Holstein's and The No Exit.

== Career and themes ==
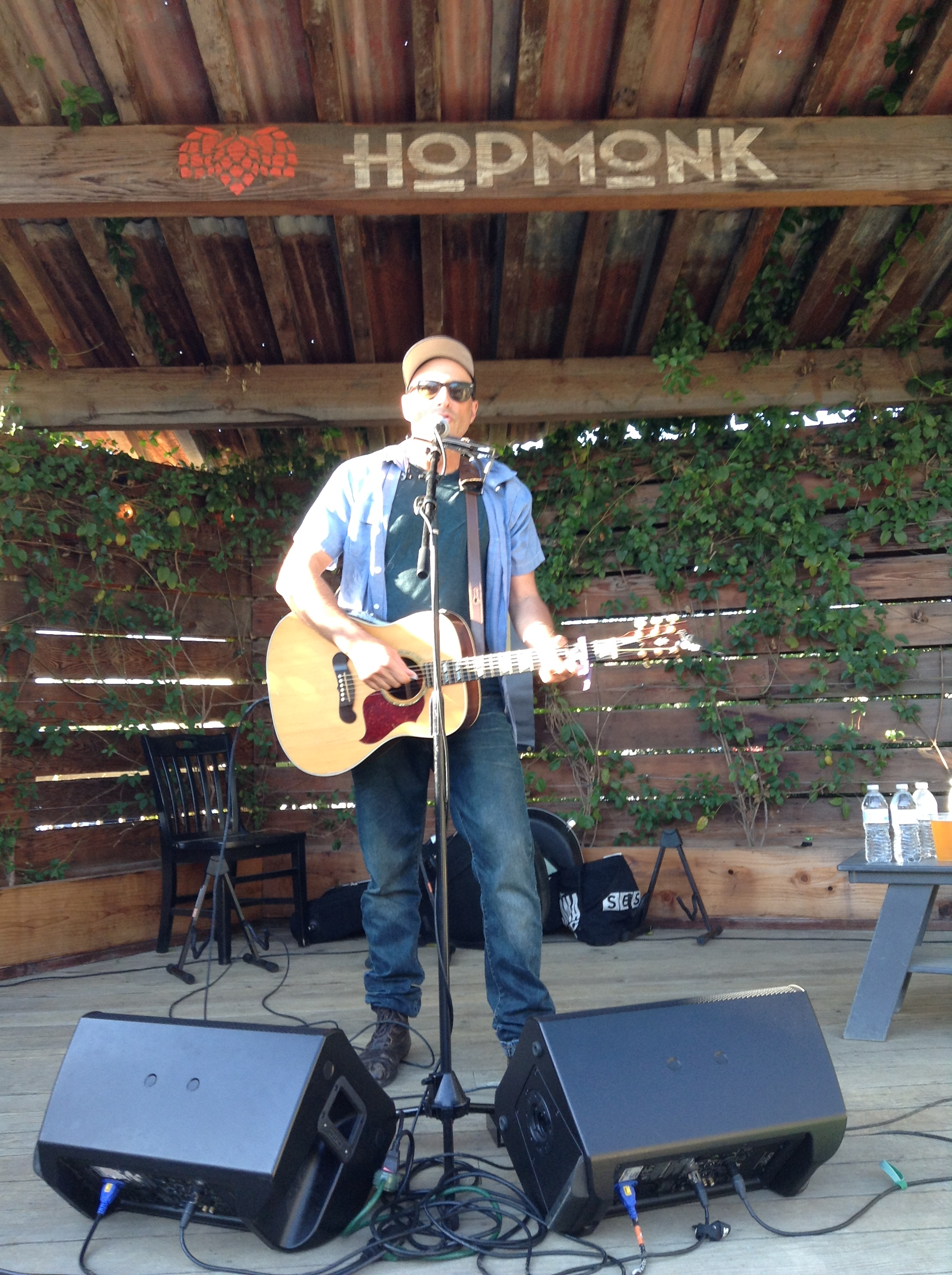
Dan Bern at Hopmonk Tavern in Novato, California.

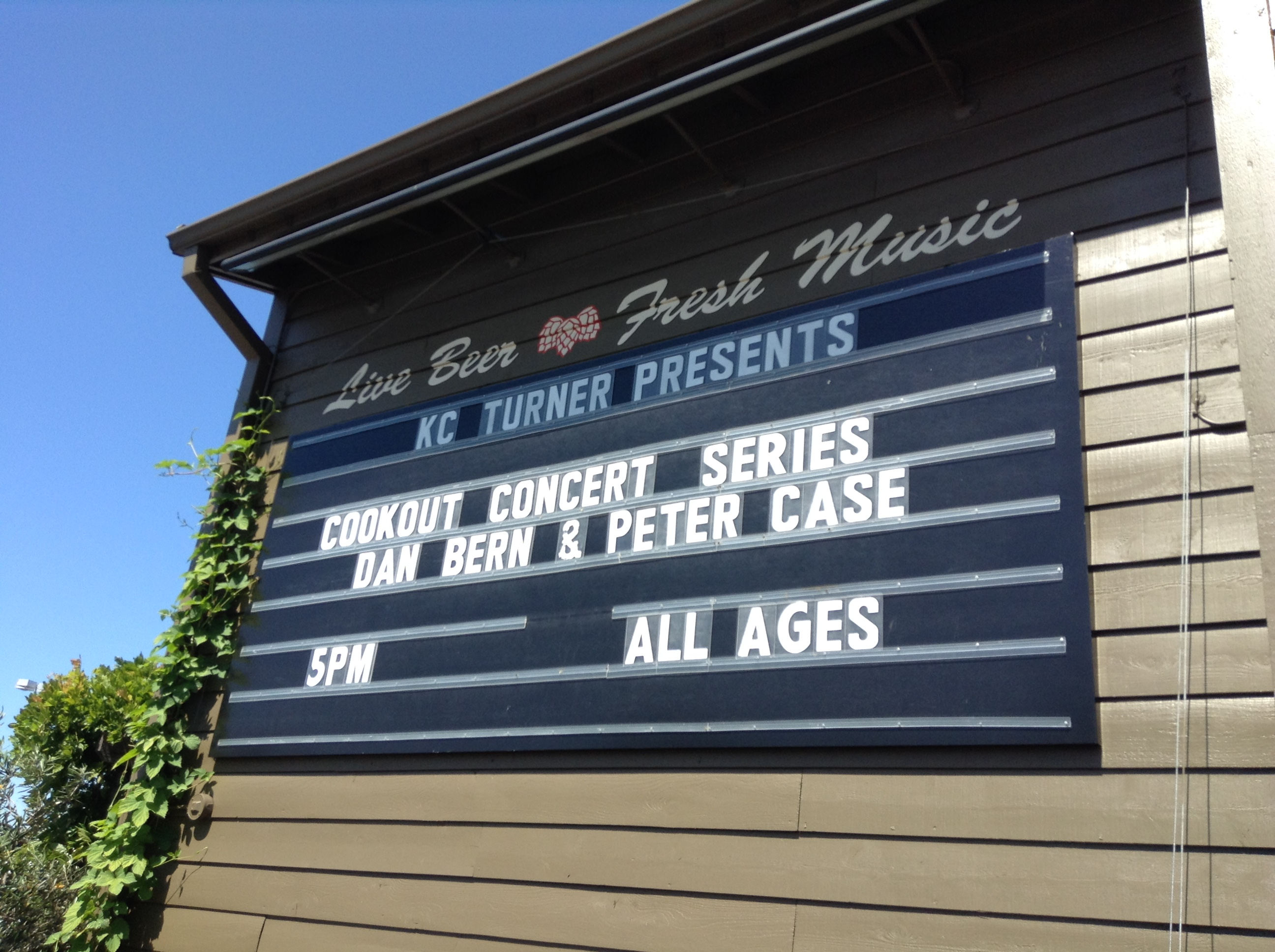
Marquee advertises a Dan Bern performance.

Between 1997 and 2003, many of his tours and recordings featured a regular cast of backup musicians which he began calling the International Jewish Banking Conspiracy or IJBC, which Bern said was a tribute to the book Nigger by Dick Gregory.

Although a vein of social and political humor runs through even his earliest work, Bern's songs became more explicitly political during the 2004 US presidential election campaign, with songs such as "Bush Must Be Defeated" and "President" highlighting his sometimes surreal political takes. His work often deals with his Lithuanian Jewish ancestry, as in songs like "Lithuania." The name Bernstein is a reference to this ancestry; on a trip to Lithuania, he learned it was his family's name before immigration to the United States. In 2004, Bern published the novel Quitting Science and, in 2012, Cleaver the Gronk under the pen name Cunliffe Merriwether.

New American Language, The Swastika EP, Fleeting Days and My Country II were all released under the "Dan Bern & the International Jewish Banking Conspiracy" name. The IJBC featured longtime Bern producer and collaborator Wil Masisak on keyboards, drums, guitar, and bass; Eben "Eby Brown" Grace on guitar and pedal steel; Brian "Slim Nickel" Schey on bass and guitar; Paul Kuhn on cellocaster; Anna Phoebe on electric violin; and drummers Colin "Spanky" Mahoney and Jake Coffin.

In early 2007, Bern's Breathe won in The 6th Annual Independent Music Awards for Best Folk/Singer-Songwriter Album.

Bern's songwriting skills were used in the 2007 biopic parody film Walk Hard where he helped write 16 songs for the movie. Many of these songs made the theatrical cut of the film including the Dylanesque "Royal Jelly," and the melodic "(Have You Heard the News) Dewey Cox Died." He continues to write songs for films, including Get Him to the Greek and Father's Day.

In 2009, 2010, and 2012, Bern played with Common Rotation from Los Angeles, California which consists of vocals, guitar, banjo, trumpet, saxophone, and other instruments. Their concert in September 2009 at the M Bar in Los Angeles, was released as a live album in the spring of 2010 called "Live in Los Angeles" with about half the songs Bern playing solo and the other half including Common Rotation.

Bern's song "One Dance" was also included in Kasdan's first film, Zero Effect. Bern wrote "Swing Set," a duet with Emmylou Harris, for the off Broadway production of Family Week (directed by Jonathan Demme), and wrote the title song for Demme's documentary Jimmy Carter: Man From Plains.

In 2012, Bern released two studio recordings of American roots music: Drifter, featuring a duet with Emmylou Harris, and Doubleheader, an 18-song tribute to baseball culled from close to 30 years of songwriting and recorded at Bob Weir's TRI Studios in Marin County. Doubleheader features the song "Johnny Sylvester Comes Back to Visit the Babe", in which he put words and music to the story of Babe Ruth and Johnny Sylvester.

Bern has created two podcasts: 10,000 Crappy Songs: A Musical Detective Story, a fictional radio drama featuring original music from Bern; and Hunkered in the Bunker, a series of free-form shows produced during the COVID-19 pandemic. He also produces an internet radio station, Radio Free Bernsteinn.

In 2020, Bern created the song "Never-To-Be-Forgotten Kinda Year" to soundtrack Reddit's 2020 "Year in Review" video.

=== Influence ===
Bern's song "Talkin' Woody, Bob, Bruce, and Dan Blues," from the album Smartie Mine, offers a joking take on the influence of Dylan and Guthrie, presented in the style of a Guthrie or Dylan talking blues song, and containing a spoof of a Springsteen song as well. When asked about the similarity between himself and Dylan, he once quipped, "I guess Bob Dylan was sort of the Dan Bern of the '60's."

== Personal life ==
In 1991, he lived in Hollywood, taught tennis in Encino to make a living as a songwriter. The junior scouts from the major record companies “were coming around". Bern is married to Danielle Lesniewski. They have a daughter, Lulu, who Bern listed as a collaborator and later the lead artist on several of his children's albums. The family lived in Los Angeles until 2016 before moving eastward for family reasons. They now reside in New Mexico.

An avid fan of sports and baseball in particular, Bern has written and recorded a number of sports-focused albums and songs, such as the tennis-centered Jack Kramer Wood Racket and the baseball albums Doubleheader, Rivalry, and Elly De La Cruz & Other Stories, the latter of which was created "especially for Reds fans." Bern also listens to the sports podcast The Tony Kornheiser Show "religiously" and began submitting his sports songs for the show to use on-air. After running through his existing library, he began writing songs specifically for the show; these are compiled in his Songs for Mr. Tony records.

== Discography ==
=== Studio albums ===
- Dan Bern (1997)
- Fifty Eggs (1998)
- Smartie Mine (double album; 1998)
- New American Language (2001)
- Fleeting Days (2003)
- Breathe (2006)
- Moving Home (2008)
- 2 Feet Tall (2009)
- Drifter (2012)
- Doubleheader (2012)
- Wilderness Song (2012)
- Hanukkah Songs (2013)
- 3 Feet Tall (2015)
- Hoody (2015)
- Adderal Holiday (2016)
- Regent Street (2019)
- Ivan's Barbershop (2020)
- Quarantine Me (2020)
- Rivalry (2020)
- 4 Feet Tall and Rising (2021) (credited to "Lulu Bern ft. Dan Bern")
- Needlequake (2023) (with Orit Shimoni, Paul Kuhn, and Adam Busch, as "The Needles Pop Group")
- Starting Over (Mar 1, 2024) (backed by Jane's Great Dane)

=== EPs ===
- Dog Boy Van (1996)
- World Cup (2002)
- The Swastika EP (2002)
- Anthems (2004)
- My Country II (2004)
- Breathe Easy (2006)
- Shining (2020)

=== Live recordings ===
- Live in Los Angeles (2010)
- Live in New York (2011)

=== Digital-only releases ===
- Divine and Conquer (1994; released 2007)
- The Burbank Tapes (1998; released in 2007)
- Macaroni Cola (2000–2001; released in 2007)
- Songs of Fall (2014)
- Hashtag 800cc (EP; 2020)
- "Never-To-Be-Forgotten Kinda Year" (single track; 2020)
- Jack Kramer Wood Racket (2021)
- The Last Days of Trump: The Opera (2021) (with Jonathan Flaugher)
- Songs for Mr. Tony, vol. 1 (2022)
- Songs for Mr. Tony, vol. 2 (2022)
- Songs for Mr. Tony, vol. 3 (2023)
- Elly De La Cruz & Other Stories (EP; 2023)
