= Muqaddas =

Muqaddas (Arabic: مقدس) is an Arabic word meaning "sanctified".

It may refer to:

== Places ==
- Bayt al-Muqaddas, Arabic name and a common designation for Jerusalem in Islamic sources
- Al-arḍ al-muqaddasa, the Holy Land

== Other ==
- Al-Jihad al-Muqaddas: a Palestinian Arab irregular force in the 1947-48 Palestinian civil war.
- Muqaddas (TV series), 2015 Pakistani TV series
- Jang e Muqaddas (lit. 'Holy War'), a debate between Christians and Muslims in colonial India

== See also ==
- Maqdisi, an Arabic surname for someone from Jerusalem
  - Al-Maqdisi, a 10th-century Arab geographer
