= My Country II =

Studio album by Dan Bern & the IJBC
- Released: August 31, 2004
- Genre: Folk rock
- Length: 34:05
- Label: Messenger

Dan Bern & the IJBC chronology
Fleeting Days (2003)	My Country II (2004)	Breathe (2006)

My Country II: Music To Beat Bush By is an album by folk rock singer-songwriter Dan Bern and his band the International Jewish Banking Conspiracy (or IJBC), released August 31, 2004 on Messenger Records. It consists of songs performed by Bern calling for George W. Bush to be defeated in the 2004 presidential election.

== Reviews ==
Professional ratings
Review scores
Source	Rating
AllMusic	3.5/5 stars
Hot Press	(favorable)
No Depression	(favorable)
Paste	(favorable)
Slant Magazine	3.5/5 stars
Uncut	3/5
The Village Voice	(choice cut)

Slant Magazine's Sal Cinquemani gave My Country II 3.5 out of 5 stars, writing that Bern "shoots his dissent straight from the hip—lest we forget that folk music was the first punk rock." In another favorable review, Hot Press's Phil Udell described the album's music as "Country music with a sense of righteousness and a sense of humour."

== Track listing ==
1. President – 7:36
2. Sammy’s Bat – 4:19
3. Tyranny – 4:38
4. Ostrich Town – 5:00
5. After the Parade – 3:11
6. My Country II – 3:06
7. The Torn Flag (originally by Pete Seeger) – 2:17
8. Bush Must Be Defeated – 3:58
