= Fifty Eggs =

Studio album by Dan Bern
- Released: March 31, 1998
- Genre: Folk rock
- Length: 50:20
- Label: Work
- Producer: Ani DiFranco

Dan Bern chronology
Dan Bern (1997)	Fifty Eggs (1998)	Smartie Mine (1999)

Professional ratings
Review scores
Source	Rating
AllMusic	3/5 stars
Christgau's Consumer Guide	(1-star Honorable Mention)
Entertainment Weekly	B+

Fifty Eggs is musician Dan Bern's second studio album, a follow-up to his first full-length album Dan Bern. It was produced by Ani DiFranco and released in 1998.

== Track listing ==
All tracks composed by Dan Bern

1. "Tiger Woods"
2. "One Thing Real"
3. "No Missing Link"
4. "Oh Sister"
5. "Cure for AIDS"
6. "Chick Singers"
7. "Different Worlds"
8. "Everybody's Baby"
9. "One Dance"
10. "Jesus Freak"
11. "Monica"
12. "Rolling Away"
13. "Suzanne" (hidden track)
