= Jerusalem! Tactical Game of the 1948 War =

Board wargame published in 1975

Cover of SDC's first edition Pouch game, 1975

Jerusalem! Tactical Game of the 1948 War is a board wargame published by Simulations Design Corporation (SDC) in 1975 that simulates the 1948 Arab–Israeli War.

== Description ==
Jerusalem! is a two-player game in which one player controls Israeli forces and the other player controls Arab forces, both vying for control of Jerusalem.

=== Components ===
- 15.5" x 30" unmounted paper hex grid map of Jerusalem and environs
- 32-page rule book
- 270 die-cut counters
- two set-up and reinforcement charts and a terrain effect chart

=== Gameplay ===
The game lasts twelve turns. Game mechanics are taken from Battle for Hue, published by SDC in 1973. The structure of each turn is:

1. Israeli movement
2. First Fire Phase: If Israeli units have moved adjacent to an Arab unit, and the Israeli player has announced an attack against the Arab unit, the defending Arab unit may fire first. Then all remaining units on both sides may fire at enemy units within sight and range. Each unit can only fire once during the turn, so players may choose to hold fire until the Second Fire Phase, when they might have better combat odds.
3. Arab Movement
4. Second Fire Phase: If Arab units have moved adjacent to an Israeli unit, and the Arab player has announced an attack against that Israeli unit, then the defending Israeli unit, if it has not already fired this turn, may fire first. Then all remaining units on both sides who have not already fired this turn can fire at enemy units within sight and range.

There are also special rules for Arab and Israeli terrorist units; armored bulldozers that can build new roads into Jerusalem; and leaders.

==== Movement ====
Movement can either be via roads or on other terrain, and the moving player can do either one or the other first, but the two types of movement cannot be mixed. The moving player must make all of one type of movement before starting the other type of movement.

==== Israeli convoys ====
The only way for the Israeli player to resupply units inside the city is to successfully get a convoy from the edge of the map into the city with needed supplies. At the start of the turn, the Israeli player must announce the exact route the convoy will take, and the convoy must not deviate from this route. If the convoy arrives in the city successfully, the Israeli player may revive a previously eliminated unit or re-mobilize a demobilized unit. If the convoy is destroyed, the Israeli player must eliminate or de-mobilize a unit inside the city. Regardless of the convoy's success or failure, the convoy marker is returned to the edge of the map so that the Israeli player can attempt another convoy the next turn.

=== Victory conditions ===
The Israeli player wins by occupying at least 5 hexes of the city at the end of Turn 12, and must also have a clear road to the edge of the map. The Arab player wins by preventing these conditions.

== Publication history ==
Between 1972 and 1974, John Hill designed several wargames, all of which were published by SDC as part of their "Pouch Games" line — games that were packaged in ziplock bags. In 1975, SDC published another of Hill's games, Jerusalem! both as a pull-out game in Issue #9 of their house magazine Conflict, and as part of their Pouch Games series.

Despite good word-of-mouth, the game did not prove to be popular, and in a 1976 poll by Simulations Publications Inc. to determine the most popular wargames in North America, Jerusalem! placed a disappointing 145th out of 202 games.

Second edition, published by Mayfair Games, 1982

SDC went out of business shortly afterwards, and in 1982, Mayfair Games acquired the game license for Jerusalem! and published a second edition as a boxed set with the slightly revised title Jerusalem: The Tactical Game of the 1948 Arab-Israeli War.

Following the demise of Mayfair, Cool Stuff Unlimited published a 3rd edition in 2007 that returned to the original title Jerusalem! Tactical Game of the 1948 War and included a new scenario.

== Reception ==
In Issue #7 of Command, Jim Bumpas called Jerusalem! "a great new game [...] exciting and dynamic to play." Bumpas noted that the rules mainly came from the previously published Battle for Hue, but thought that enough interesting changes had been made to make this a completely different game. He admitted the game "may be rather long to play" but noted "You literally lose track of everything else, this game is so engrossing."

In Issue 9 of Perfidious Albion, J.B. Poole and David Bradley wrote, "Most reviewers agree that Jerusalem! is enjoyable and we agree with them ... a well designed map ... intelligent use of colour ... the counters too are attractive and easy to read ... charts are well set out." However, Poole and Bradley pointed out that the map was highly distorted and inaccurate, noting, for example, that the distance from Jerusalem to Kfar Etzion was 3.4 miles in the game, but is actually 10.7 miles. Their comment was "One would have thought that historical truth would have been better preserved by a map that more faithfully reflected the geography." They also questioned the time scale, noting that each turn was supposed to represent a week, but the furthest distance a tank could travel during that time was less than 3 miles. They also pointed out that the Arabs tanks were the incorrect type for the time, with considerably less firepower than the correct tanks. In conclusion, Poole and Bradley agreed that the game "is and enjoyable and an exciting game. In many respects it is an accurate simulation of the struggle for Israel's independence. Despite this, we have certain reservations regarding the game's design and its claim to historical accuracy."

In Issue 4 of the British wargaming magazine Phoenix, Tony Jones gave a lengthy analysis of the game and then concluded, "This is, to me, a good game [...] Try to get this game into your collection, I don't think you'll be disappointed."

In Issue 55 of the UK magazine Games & Puzzles (December 1976), Nick Palmer noted that "Jerusalem! is not as simple as it appears at first glance, but it is very much designed as a 'fun' game, and anyone wishing to prove his tremendous skill should choose a game less dependent on the slings and arrows of outrageous die-rolls." Palmer found that "The game is effectively in two phases, which are too distinct and unconnected to be altogether satisfactory." He thought that "The game is well-balanced and exciting, but the range of alternative plans for each side seems limited, so not only does one not have to think very hard, but it is doubtful whether much would be gained by doing so." In Palmer's book The Comprehensive Guide to Board Wargaming, he found this game's "lowish [popularity] rating is odd, as many people enthuse about this John Hill game." Palmer liked the game, commenting, "The map is small but attractive — the word 'cosy' is appropriate — and the pieces exotically varied, while the rules are highly inventive." Although he found the game "Exciting and colourful", Palmer did note several drawbacks to the game: "the Arabs are unable to do much until the Arab Legion arrives, and then the outcome may hinge on a few crucial die-rolls as very powerful forces meet and one side is annihilated." Despite this, Palmer concluded, "But it's fun."

In The Guide to Simulations/Games for Education and Training, Martin Campion called this "a fast moving accurate simulation which uses an unusually flexible game system to reflect the unusually fluid situation around Jerusalem in 1948."

In a retrospective review in Issue 8 of Simulacrum, Brian Train commented, "This is a complicated game but not a complex one, and some reviewers have complained about its ultimate play balance and rules loopholes caused by John Hill’s casual and humorous rules writing style. But it's still a fun match."

== Awards ==
At the 2008 Charles S. Roberts Awards, the 3rd edition of Jerusalem! was a finalist in two categories, "Best Post-WWII Era Boardgame of 2007", and "Best DTP-Produced Boardgame of 2007."

== Other reviews and commentary ==
- Panzerfaust & Campaign #71 and #78
- Fire & Movement #66
- Moves #55, p5"Arab-Israeli Game Survey" (PDF). Moves - The Magazine for Gamers. 1981. Archived from the original (PDF) on January 23, 2025.
