= Verdun: The Game of Attrition =

WWI board wargame published in 1972 by Conflict Games

Verdun: The Game of Attrition is a board wargame published by Conflict Games in 1972 that simulates the Battle of Verdun during World War I.

== Background ==
In 1916, the third year of the Great War, the massive armies of the combatants in Europe were locked in a stalemate on the Western Front that was marked by a line of trenches that extended from the North Sea to the border of Switzerland. Knowing the historical significance of Verdun to France as the resting place of Charlemagne, the German High Command planned an assault there that would draw the French into a killing ground, dealing a fatal blow to the French Army. As German General der Infanterie Erich von Falkenhayn predicted, Verdun would be "where the forces of France will bleed to death." Although the initial German assault was successful, and did draw French divisions into the area to repel the attack, the Germans failed to withdraw after initial successes, and the two sides became mired in an 11-month back and forth struggle. The two armies each suffered over 300,000 casualties.

== Description ==
Verdun is a 2-player board wargame in which one player controls German forces, while the other controls French forces.

In keeping with historical amounts of reinforcements that were available during the actual battle, the French always get reinforcements each turn, while the German player must roll a 6 on a die in order to receive reinforcements. Likewise, supplies of artillery ammunition decrease as the battle progresses. There are also rules for German use of flamethrowers and phosgene gas.

The order of play each turn is an "I Go, You Go" alternating system. After checking for weather conditions at the start of the turn, the Germans attack first:

1. German roll for attempted reinforcements
2. German movement
3. German bombardment (French counter battery)
4. German infantry combat

The French then have the same opportunities, except they do not have to roll a die for reinforcements. This completes one turn, which covers one week of game time.

=== Scenarios ===
The game comes with two scenarios:

- Historical scenario: The German assault begins on 21 February 1916
- What-if scenario: The German assault begins earlier, before the French have time to build their defenses.

=== Victory conditions ===
- The German player wins a tactical victory by eliminating at least 50 French units and French losses are at least 25% higher than German losses. This becomes a strategic victory by eliminating 70 French units and French losses are at least 50% higher than German losses.
- The French player wins a tactical victory by preventing the Germans from winning as well as holding on to all three hexes representing the town of Verdun. This becomes a strategic victory if the German losses are at least 25% higher than French losses while retaining all three hexes of Verdun.

== Publication history ==
Verdun was designed by John Hill, and was one of his first board wargames. It was published by Conflict Games in 1972.

== Reception ==
In a poll conducted by SPI in 1977 to determine the most popular board wargames in North America, Verdun placed 116th out of 212 games.

In Issue 39 of the British wargaming magazine Perfidious Albion, Charles Vasey and Geoffrey Barnard discussed this game. Vasey commented, "The game is big, dumb, bloody, lacking in opportunity for skillful play, and (most damning of all) has nothing to do with the battle for Verdun." Barnard concurred, saying, "As a game, there was nothing here to recommend, even a boring slogging-match would have been more interesting than the existing game in that at least [it] would have had some basis in history." Vasey concluded, "It transforms a terrible event into the mindless vapourings of gaming." Barnard concluded, "Really an utter failure both as a game and as a simulation."

In The Guide to Simulations/Games for Education and Training, Martin Campion thought this would be a good teaching tool. "The game shows the effect of trenches and forts, the importance of artillery, and the way the battle chewed up units on both sides."

Writing for Centurion's Review, David Lent thought the game was interesting for the first few turns, saying, "This game accurately simulates the carnage of this horrible battle. In addition, it shows how difficult the battle was for the Germans. However, the game is fairly pointless after the 7th turn since the German forces have lots of artillery with very little ammo and almost no infantry at this point. Sure, the Germans might roll well and get a division. However, at this point the game is just pointless."

== Other reviews and commentary ==
- Strategy & Tactics #69
- Panzerfaust #58 and #67
