= Battle for Stalingrad (wargame) =

1980 WWII board wargame

- Original SPI edition
- Designers: John Hill
- Illustrators: Redmond A. Simonsen
- Publishers: SPI
- Publication: 1980
- Genres: WWII

Battle for Stalingrad, subtitled "The Struggle for the City, September–November 1942", is a board wargame published by Simulations Publications Inc. (SPI) in 1980 that simulates the first seven weeks of the Battle of Stalingrad during World War II.

== Background ==
At the start Germany's invasion of the Soviet Union, Operation Barbarossa, Stalingrad (now Volgograd) was the largest industrial centre of the Soviet Union and an important transport hub on the Volga River; controlling Stalingrad meant gaining access to the oil fields of the Caucasus and having supreme authority over the Volga River. The city was therefore one of Germany's key objectives, and one that the Soviet Union could not afford to lose.

== Description ==
Battle for Stalingrad is a wargame for two players in which one controls the German forces, and the other controls the Soviet forces. The 22" x 34" hex grid game map, scaled at 600 metres (660 yd) per hex, shows Stalingrad and environs.

=== Gameplay ===
The game follows this sequence, with each turn representing one week of the battle:

- Air Bombardment (both sides)
- Artillery Bombardment (both sides)
- Action Phase: Germany attacks first. After each attack, the Soviet player draws a chit. If it is blank, it is discarded, and the German offensive continues. If the chit is labelled "Reaction", the attack shifts to the Soviets, and continues until either the Soviet player runs out of possible moves, or rolls a 6 on an attack die. In this case, the attack shifts back to the German player. Play continues like this until the German attack is finished. Then the Soviet player has a final reaction phase, rolling a die and moving that many units, as well as receiving a fresh reinforcement of armored units from the Tractor Works.

=== Scenarios ===
The game comes with two scenarios:

1. Week 1: Designed to enable the players to learn the game, the scenario is only one turn in length
2. Weeks 1–7: The scenario is seven turns long, and simulates the first seven weeks of the battle.

=== Victory conditions ===
- Short Scenario: The German player wins by either earning 8 Victory Points or capturing major locations in the city.
- Long Scenario:The German player wins by earning 12 Victory Points.

In both scenarios, the Soviet player wins by denying the German player victory.

Hobby Japan's 1983 version featuring artwork by Rodger B. MacGowan

== Publication history ==
Independent game designer John Hill had designed the bestseller Squad Leader (Avalon Hill) in 1977, and his name was so well known in the wargaming field that when he sold Battle of Stalingrad to SPI in 1980, the game box cover prominently listed his name as the designer. The game proved popular, immediately appearing on SPI's "Top Ten Bestselling List" at #5; two months later, the game rose to #2.

In 1983, Hobby Japan published a Japanese-language version with cover art by Rodger MacGowan. In 2005, the Japanese publisher Six Angles published a Japanese-language version in magazine format. In 2011, Excalibre Games republished the original SPI version.

== Reception ==
In Issue 46 of the British wargaming magazine Perfidious Albion, Charles Vasey commented, "As with [John] Hill games, this is not the usual system. The [Germans] are well organised and jack-boot about like it was going out of business. Every so often in the [German] Movement/Combat the [Soviet player] gets to react, but he never knows for how long and with how many men, at any time his reaction may stop and it's back to the German to move/fight his remaining units." Vasey concluded, "Not for the perfect planners, but should appeal to anyone who likes Hill's approach to simulating the 'feel' of the battle." In the following issue, Geoffrey Barnard replied with his thoughts. Barnard found the operation phases "some of the most innovative systems I have come across." Although Barnard found some anomalies in the rules, "Other than that the game really does 'hang together' well." Barnard concluded, "If you want to play a game which is fun like Squad Leader, then give Battle for Stalingrad a try."

In Issue 23 of Fire & Movement, Friedrich Helfferich noted, "John Hill's games are designed not as detailed models of an era or event, but to capture what the designer perceives as the ultimate driving force or rationale behind the event, the historical 'lesson', and they should be judged accordingly ... How well the game manages to capture the essence of the struggle and to express John Hill's view of it as a 'splendid German fighting machine' being stopped in its tracks by Chuikov's 'armed mob'. This it does well indeed."

In Issue 63 of Fire & Movement, Jeff Petraska called the game, "an exciting, highly playable simulation ... Like many of [John] Hill's designs, Battle for Stalingrad emphasizes playability over rigid historicity, and some may be put off by Hill's admittedly eccentric approach." Petraska concluded, "there's no denying the game is terrific fun and does an admirable job of simulating the tension of the conflict, if not the actual nuts and bolts."

In Issue 56 of Moves, Jerrold Thomas commented, "The game has a unique development; both sides can radically affect the outcome by one or two coups, and yet steady patient play yields great advantages. Two armies are wholly dissimilar, yet they are relatively balanced." Thomas concluded, "The game moves well, tests planning and patience, yet has constant tension. All in all, I like it!"

In a retrospective review in Issue 11 of Simulacrum, Luc Olivier commented, "Battle for Stalingrad is the final attempt of John Hill to develop his view of the biggest struggle over a city in all of WWII. The game mechanisms are not very complex, but sometimes quite strange and blurred, and the simulation is definitely more of a painting of the battle than a real picture." Olivier concluded, "Globally, the game is interesting to play, perhaps more to understand the way John Hill saw the battle, than to see the historical event."

== Other reviews and commentary ==
- Strategy & Tactics #79
- The Wargamer Vol.1 #14
- Campaign #101
