= Battle for Hue (wargame) =

1973 board wargame

- Cover of SDC's "pouch game" edition, 1975
- Designers: John Hill
- Publishers: Simulations Design Corporation; Mayfair Games
- Players: 2
- Playing time: 2 to 3 hours
- Chance: Medium
- Skills: Military tactics

Battle for Hue is a board wargame published by Simulations Design Corporation (SDC) in 1973 that simulates the battle for the city of Huế during the 1968 Tet Offensive of the Vietnam War. It was later reissued by Mayfair Games as Hue.

== Background ==
On 30 January 1968, the forces of North Vietnam launched the Tet Offensive, a large number of surprise attacks against targets throughout South Vietnam in an effort to foment unrest, trigger desertions in the South Vietnamese forces, and cause a popular uprising that would bring down the South Vietnamese government. However, after the initial shock and confusion, South Vietnamese and American forces responded, and most of the PAVN/VC attacks were quickly repelled with great losses. However, the PAVN/VC offensive against the ancient capital city of Huế was considered a key objective of the Tet Offensive, and fighting for control of the city continued for over a month.

== Description ==
Battle for Hue is a two-player tactical-level wargame in which one player controls the North Vietnamese People's Army of Vietnam (PAVN) and the Viet Cong (VC), while the other player controls the South Vietnamese Army of the Republic of Vietnam (ARVN) and elements of the United States Marine Corps (USMC).

=== Components ===
- 17" x 22" paper hex grid map of Huế
- 156 die-cut counters
- 6-page rulebook
- Turn Record/Reinforcement Chart

=== Gameplay ===
The game uses a system of five phases per turn that blend both players' moves:

1. PAVN/VC movement: All units can move 6 hexes regardless of terrain
2. First Fire Phase: If PAVN/VC units have moved adjacent to ARVN/USMC units, the ARVN/USMC fire first and damage is resolved. Then all remaining units on both sides can fire at enemy units within sight and range. This is the only time that PAVN/VC can fire rockets.
3. USMC/ARVN Road Movement: Units can move unlimited distances along roads but cannot move adjacent to PAVN/VC units.
4. USMC/ARVN Regular Movement: Most units can move 2 hexes regardless of terrain. Artillery can only move 1 hex and is excluded from some terrain. Armored/mechanzied units can move 4 hexes but are limited to certain types of terrain.
5. Second Fire Phase: If ARVN/USMC units have moved adjacent to PAVN/VC units, the PAVN/VC fire first and damage is resolved. Then all remaining units on both sides can fire at enemy units within sight and range.

Finishing these phases completes one turn, which represents 24 hours of game time. The game does not have a turn limit. The last reinforcements enter the game on Turn 12. After that, the game lasts as long as both sides have units on the board.

=== Victory conditions ===
Both players get victory points for destroying enemy units. In addition the PAVN/VC gain 1 point for each turn when at least one of their units occupies the Inner City, and the USMC/ARVN receives 20 points for clearing the Inner City of enemy units.

Box cover of Mayfair game's 1982 edition titled "Hue"

== Publication history ==
In 1973, SDC published a Vietnam War game, Dien Bien Phu, and they returned to that theme later the same year. Only five years after the Tet Offensive, John Hill designed Battle for Hue, and it was published as a pull-out game in Conflict #6. Two years later, SDC re-issued it as a "pouch game" (packaged in a ziplock bag). With the demise of SDC, Mayfair Games acquired the rights to the game and reissued it in 1982 as a boxed set with a new map, slightly revised rules, and retitled as simply Hue.

== Reception ==
In the 1977 book The Comprehensive Guide to Board Wargaming, game critic Charles Vasey called it "a splendid tactical game by John Hill [...] The game accurately simulates the fierce actions fought in the streets." He concluded "Full of period 'feel.'"

In Issue 18 of Fire & Movement, Rodger B. MacGowan commented, "It is an exciting game on an unusual subject and can be recommended to those with a strong interest in the Vietnam War."

In Issue 13 of Phoenix, Rob Gibson characterized the game as "an unusual game about a controversial subject but a very playable game that will please any gamer who tries it." He concluded with a strong recommendation, saying, "the removal of the NVA/VC units has to be conducted with skill and care, as has the NVA/VC defence of its gains. The result is a finely balanced simulation."

In The Wargamer, Larry Tuohy reviewed the Mayfair edition and was ambivalent, saying, "If Hue doesn't stink, neither does it shine. It is a simple playable little game which has a number of flaws." Tuohy believed the game's major flaw was that it ignores history — in 1968, the North Vietnamese generals ordered their forces to quickly envelope the entire city. However, Tuohy pointed out that the PAVN/VC forces in the game are under no such orders and can use proper tactical infiltrations — making this "an impossible game for the USMC/ARVN player to win [and] destroys any semblance the game may have to the real battle." He concluded, "In sum, Hue can provide a few enjoyable hours if you are interested solely in pitting your cardboard counters against someone else's across a rather dreary map of a city. If, on the other hand, you are looking for a simulation of the events in Hue in February 1968 you may as well keep right on looking."

== Other reviews and commentary ==
- Panzerfaust #71
- Battleplan #2
