= Naziri =

Naziri is a surname. Notable people with the surname include:

- Elhad Naziri (born 1992), Azerbaijani footballer
- Micah Ben David Naziri (born 1977), Activist, author, journalist and martial arts instructor, active in the U.S. as well as Israel and the Palestinian territories
- Mirwais Naziri (fl. 2009), Afghan cricketer

== See also ==
- Nazir (name)
