= Yerushalmi (surname) =

Yerushalmi (Hebrew: ירושלמי) is a Hebrew surname literally meaning "a Jerusalemite".

- David Yerushalmi (born 1956), American lawyer and political activist
- Eden Yerushalmi (1999–2024), Israeli former hostage
- Efrat Yerushalmi, birth name of Shez, Israeli writer
- Elieser Yerushalmi (1900–1962), Israeli writer, educator, and activist
- Eliyahu Yerushalmi (born 1954), Israeli diplomat
- Eylon Yerushalmi, Israeli footballer
- Rina Yerushalmi (born 1939), Israeli theater director and choreographer.
- Roy Yerushalmi (born 1983), Israeli journalist
- Yeshayahu Yerushalmi (1920–1999, Israeli judge
- Yifat Tomer-Yerushalmi (born 1974), Israeli major general of the Israel Defense Forces
- Yosef Hayim Yerushalmi (1932 - 2009), American professor of Jewish History, Culture and Society

== See also ==
- Leon Uris (1925–2003) USA born novelist and humanitarian. Uris is a shortened version of Yerushalmi
