= Ghodsi Mohammadi Ziarani =

Iranian chemist

- قدسی محمدی زیارانی
- Born: 1964 (age 61–62)
- Education: Teacher Training University, Tehran (BSc, MSc), Laval University, Quebec (PhD)
- Scientific career
- Fields: chemistry
- Institutions: Alzahra University
- Thesis: Enantioselective Synthesis of Natural Products Via Enzymatic Desymmetrizations (2000)
- Doctoral advisor: Thérèse Di Paolo-Chênevert

Ghodsi Mohammadi Ziarani (born 1964) is an Iranian chemist and Professor of Organic Chemistry at Alzahra University. Mohammadi Ziarani is among the most-cited Iranian researchers and is known for her works on organic chemistry, nanochemistry, multi-component reactions, natural product synthesis, and asymmetric synthesis.

== Books ==
- Metal - Free Synthetic Organic Dyes, Ghodsi Mohammadi Ziarani, Razieh Moradi, Negar Lashgari, Hendrik G. Kruger, Elsevier 2018, ISBN 9780128156476
