= Yalu: The Chinese Counteroffensive in Korea, November 1950 to May 1951 =

Korean War board wargame

Box cover of first edition, Conflict Games, 1977

Yalu, subtitled "The Chinese Counteroffensive in Korea, November 1950 - May 1951", is a board wargame published by Conflict Games in 1977 that simulates the major Chinese counteroffensive in October 1950 during the Korean War.

== Background ==
In September 1950, the United Nations and the army of South Korea broke out of the Pusan Perimeter, and began driving north against a poorly equipped North Korean Army, who had outrun their supply lines. The UN offensive was successful, and the UN forces invaded North Korea with the aim of conquering all of Korea and bringing the two sides together by force. China warned the UN not to approach the Yalu River, which marked the Sino-Korean border, or it would intervene on North Korea's side. General Douglas MacArthur advised American President Harry S Truman that the Chinese were bluffing, and the UN offensive continued northward towards the border. On 25 October 1950, 200,000 Chinese soldiers crossed the North Korean border and engaged UN forces in a massive surprise offensive.

== Description ==
Yalu is a board wargame for two players in which one player controls UN forces and the other Chinese and North Korean forces. The two sides are asymmetrical: The UN forces have more supplies and more combat strength, but are inferior in mobility and have fewer units; the Chinese have more units, more mobility and the ability to move freely through UN zones of control, but have fewer supplies and not as much offensive punch. Each turn represents one week of game time.

== Publication history ==
Game designer John Hill had started creating board wargames in 1972, using his own company, Conflict Games, to publish a first edition. He then usually sold the games to Simulations Design Corporation (SDC). In 1977, Hill designed Yalu and published the first edition through Conflict Games. However, by this time, SDC had gone out of business so Hill sold the game to Game Designers' Workshop.

In 2009, Compass Games republished Yalu with an updated map and some rules revisions.

== Reception ==
In the 1980 book The Complete Book of Wargames, game designer Jon Freeman pointed out that John Hill's games were criticized for favoring the feel of a game over historical accuracy. As Freeman noted, "reality is sacrificed to form — not always with any good results. Yalu distorts geography (in the mapboard), history (in the appearance and strength of various units)." Despite this, Freeman concluded by giving this game an Overall Evaluation of "Fair", saying, "Yalu is reasonably balanced, fast-moving and fun."

In The Guide to Simulations/Games for Education and Training, Richard Rydzel called this "an interesting and simple game, but it requires a very good U.N. player to survive, let alone win. It is very easy to learn and play."
