= Dan Bern (album) =

Studio album by Dan Bern
- Released: March 4, 1997
- Genre: Folk rock
- Length: 44:57
- Label: Work
- Producer: Chuck Plotkin

Dan Bern chronology
Dog Boy Van (1996)	Dan Bern (1997)	Fifty Eggs (1998)

Professional ratings
Review scores
Source	Rating
AllMusic	4.5/5 stars
Christgau's Consumer Guide	A−
Spin	6/10

Dan Bern (1997) is the debut full-length album of the Iowa native singer-songwriter Dan Bern.

== Songs ==
=== "Jerusalem" ===
At the end of "Jerusalem", the singer reveals that he is the messiah. The song opens and closes with the lyrics "When I tell you that I love you don't test my love / Accept my love / Don't test my love / 'Cuz maybe I don't love you all that much."

The song has been covered by folk singer-songwriter Ani DiFranco. It has been featured in the weather section of the podcast Welcome to Night Vale.

== Track listing ==
All tracks composed by Dan Bern

1. "Jerusalem" – 3:44
2. "Go to Sleep" – 2:33
3. "Wasteland" – 6:38
4. "Marilyn" – 2:51
5. "King of the World" – 2:48
6. "Too Late To Die Young" – 2:58
7. "Rome" – 5:54
8. "I'm Not the Guy" – 3:32
9. "Never Fall in Love" – 3:12
10. "Estelle" – 7:33
11. "Queen" – 3:13

== Personnel ==
- Dan Bern – Organ, Guitar, Harmonica, Cello, Vocals, Art Direction, Illustrations, Paintings
- Jennifer Condos – Bass
- Mick Haggerty – Art Direction, Photography
- Mouse Johnson – Engineer
- Gary Mallaber – Drums
- Stephen Marcussen – Mastering
- Chuck Plotkin – Percussion, Handclapping, Producer
- Dean Restum – Guitar, Engineer
- Micajah Ryan – Engineer
- Toby Scott – Mixing
- Marshall Thompson – Keyboards
- Josh Zawaduk – Organ, Accordion, Sound Effects, Vocals
