= Jerusalem and Figtree Hill, U.S. Virgin Islands =

Coordinates: 17°42′45″N 64°45′02″W

Jerusalem and Figtree Hill
- Village
- Interactive map of Jerusalem and Figtree Hill
- Country: United States Virgin Islands
- Island: Saint Croix

Population (2010)
  - Total: 56
- Time zone: UTC-4 (AST)

Jerusalem and Figtree Hill is a settlement on the island of Saint Croix in the United States Virgin Islands. It has a population of 56 in 35 housing units, spread over 1.05 square miles, according to the 2010 United States Census.
