= Qud =

Qud or QUD may refer to:

- Caves of Qud, a roguelike role-playing video game.
- Kichwa language, a Quechuan language with ISO 639-3 code qud.
- QUD, regional airport code for Damanhur, Egypt
- Question under discussion, in linguistics
