= Bar-Lev (game) =

Board wargame

Cover of 1974 edition, art by John Hill

Bar-Lev, subtitled "The Yom-Kippur War of 1973", is a board wargame published by Conflict Games in 1974, only months after the end of the Yom Kippur War. The game simulates battles on the two major fronts of the war: the Golan Heights and the Suez Canal. The game proved very popular, and a second edition was published by Game Designers' Workshop (GDW) in 1977.

== Background ==
On 6 October 1973, a coalition of Arab nations jointly launched a surprise attack against Israel on the Jewish holy day of Yom Kippur. Egyptian forces crossed the Suez Canal while Syrian forces attacked the Golan Heights.

== Description ==
Bar-Lev is a two-player wargame where one player controls the Arab Coalition, and the other controls the Israelis. The large (33" x 22") hex grid mapsheet is split into two sections displaying the two fronts. (In the 1977 edition published by GDW, the two maps are separate.) With 450 counters and two rulebooks (one for ground combat, one for air combat), the game is more complex than many wargames published previous to 1974.

=== Gameplay ===
Board wargames of the time traditionally used simple alternating "I Go, You Go" turns where one player moves and fires, followed by the other player. In contrast, Bar-Lev uses a complex series of phases for each game turn. For example, just the ground combat phases involve bridge building, indirect fire, movement, direct fire, advancing, and regouping. These phases are then repeated by the second player to complete one game turn, which represents one day of game time. The optional air power rules add considerable complexity and time to the game.

=== Victory conditions ===
In the original 1974 edition, the Arab player wins if the Syrians are holding three Israeli villages while losing no Syrian villages and the Egyptians have cleared out the Bar-Lev line without allowing any Israeli tanks to cross the Suez Canal. If the Arab Coalition can remove all Israelis from the map at any point, it is an instant victory. The 1977 victory conditions were revised to require either side to hold far more territory in order to claim victory.

== Publication history ==
Game designer John Hill created Bar-Lev only a few months after the end of the Yom Kippur War and published it immediately using cover art and an intensely colored map that Hill himself created. The information Hill had gleaned about the exact units involved in the war proved to be somewhat inaccurate, and several rules were also found to be ambiguous, so several errata sheets were released. The game proved to be very popular, and in 1977, Hill sold the rights to GDW. Frank Chadwick revised the units involved, based on more complete information available, and revised the rules as well. The resultant second edition titled Bar-Lev: The 1973 Arab-Israeli War, with cover art by Rich Banner, was released in 1977.

Compass Games acquired the rights to the game and published another edition in 2019 featuring cover art by Knut Grünitz.

== Reception ==
In the November 1974 edition of Airfix Magazine, Bruce Quarrie reviewed the original Conflict Games edition and found it "an intriguing — though still easy to play — game which well illustrates the tactical problems of modern conventional warfare, and the tremendous logistical problems forced on the Israelis by a war on two fronts." He concluded, "We have no hesitation in recommending this game highly."

In Issue 14 of Perfidious Albion, David Horton called the game "simple in its complexities and allows a wide range of strategies." However, Horton found the game fatally unbalanced in favor of the Israelis, noting "it is almost impossible for the Arabs to win against a moderately competent Israeli. I have fought about eight times as the Israeli and won every time, and about the same as the Arab and won once."

In the 1980 book The Best of Board Wargaming, Marcus Watney reviewed the 1977 GDW edition, and called the rules "a sophisticated mix of operational rules with a tactical flavour." However, Watney found the air rules to be too complex, calling them "more complex and difficult to use than all the ground rules put together." He also found serious flaws in the victory conditions. He concluded by giving the game an "Excitement Grade" of only 60%.

In the 1980 book The Complete Book of Wargames, game designer Jon Freeman also reviewed the 1977 edition, and called it "an ambitious game — perhaps too much so [...] forbiddingly complex for all but quite experienced gamers." He called the rules "casually chatty and hopelessly ungrammatical", but did admit that "many people swear by the game." Freeman concluded "If you are a wargamer veteran interested in the subject matter, and if you spend a few days soaking up the rules, you'll be rewarded with an enjoyable, challenging and [...] reasonably playable game. If you're not willing to go to that length, Bar-Lev is just an incredible stew of confusing detail better left unconsumed."

In Issue 55 of Moves, Ian Chadwick compared the 1974 and 1977 editions and found them to be very different games. He called the 1974 edition "an exciting, tense, fun (albeit long) game", and the 1977 edition "far more historically accurate, clean, but less fun (although also tense) [...] more of a historian's than a gamer's delight." Chadwick also found one of the most noticeable differences was the maps, calling the 1974 map "reminiscent of the psychedelic 60s: fluorescent orange maps with bright blue, red, and brown terrain [...] It was not pleasant to behold." In contrast, he thought the 1977 map was "toned down to an almost presbyterian seriousness." Chadwick concluded by giving the 1974 edition grades of A for Playability, D for Component Quality, and C for Historical Accuracy, while giving the 1977 edition grades of B, B, and A for the same things. His final recommendation was "Play the 1974 edition if you want more game; if you want more simulation, play the 1977 version. Both are good for their own reasons."

In The Guide to Simulations/Games for Education and Training, Martin Campion noted some improvement in the second edition "though still not perfect." Considering its use in the classroom, Campion concluded, "A teacher using this game might consider coupling it with a U.N. role-playing simulation on the political crisis which accompanied the war."

== Other reviews and commentary ==
- Panzerfaust and Campaign #72
- Panzerfaust #62
- Perfidious Albion #22
