= Jerusalem (surname) =

Jerusalem is a surname.

Those bearing it include:

- Ignacio de Jerusalem y Stella (c. 1707-1769), Italian-born Mexican composer
- Melvin Jerusalem (born 1994), Filipino professional boxer
- Wilhelm Jerusalem (1854–1923), Czech-Austrian philosopher
- Siegfried Jerusalem (born 1940), German operatic tenor singer
