= Bayt al-Maqdis (disambiguation) =

Bait al-Maqdis, Bayt al-Maqdis, or Bayt al-Muqaddas (Arabic: بيت المقدس bayt al-maqdis, 'House of the Holy'; Hebrew: בֵּית-הַמִּקְדָּשׁ, Bēṯ haMīqdāš, transl. 'House of the Sanctum') ie Temple in Jerusalem / Solomon's Temple is an Arabic cognate name, used later for Islamic buildings on Temple mount and for the entire city of Jerusalem.

Bayt al-Maqdis, Bayt al-Maqdis, or Bayt al-Muqaddas may also refer to:

== Locations ==
- Al-Aqsa, an Islamic religious building (r. 685–705 CE) atop the ancient holy Temple Mount
- Solomon's Temple, also known as the First Temple, a biblical Holy Temple in Jerusalem (c. 10th century BCE)
- Second Temple, later known as Herod's Temple, the reconstructed Jewish Temple in Jerusalem (c. 516 BCE)

== Organizations ==
- Ansar Bait al-Maqdis, the jihadist militant group based in Egypt.
- Aknaf Bait al-Maqdis, the Palestinian rebel group active during the Syrian Civil War.

== See also ==
- Mount Gerizim
- Temple Mount
