= Al-Quds (disambiguation) =

Al-Quds (Arabic: القدس, lit. 'The Holy') is an Arabic name for Jerusalem. The name may also refer to:

- Al-Quds (newspaper), a Palestinian newspaper
- Al-Quds (Ottoman period newspaper), an Ottoman period newspaper published in Jerusalem starting from 1908
- al-Quds rocket
- Al-Quds, a brand of Palestinian Medjool date
- Quds Day, an annual pro-Palestinian event

== See also ==
- Jerusalem (disambiguation)
- Qud (disambiguation)
