= Qodsi Mashhadi =

Qodsi Mashhadi (1582–1646) was a poet in Safavid Iran and the Mughal Empire. The "fresh style" (shiva-ye taza) that was beginning to take over Persian poetry in the 17th century is generally seen as being used by Qodsi.

== Career and poetic style ==
Qodsi Mashhadi spent several years in India at the Mughal court, during which part of his poetry was written for princes and officials in cities such as Agra and Lahore. His work is usually linked to the early phase of the sabk-e hendi (“Indian style”) in Persian poetry, which is marked by short, concentrated imagery and by the use of ideas and wordplay rather than classical rhetorical ornamentation. Several seventeenth-century manuscripts of his divan survive, showing that he wrote both ghazals and longer narrative poems. Some researchers consider him a transitional poet who connects the late Safavid tradition in Iran with the Indo-Persian literary scene that developed at the Mughal court.

== Sources ==
- Losensky, Paul E. (2003). "Qodsi Mašhadi". In Yarshater, Ehsan (ed.). Encyclopædia Iranica (Online ed.). Encyclopædia Iranica Foundation. ISBN 978-0933273634.
