= On Air (Chris Whitley album) =

Live album by Chris Whitley
- Released: October 20, 2008
- Recorded: September 8, 2003
- Genre: Rock
- Length: 1:14:46
- Label: Tradition & Moderne
- Producer: Radio Bremen

Chris Whitley chronology
Dislocation Blues (2007)	On Air (2008)

Professional ratings
Review scores
Source	Rating
Allmusic	link

On Air is the fifteenth album by singer-songwriter and guitarist Chris Whitley and his second live album. The performance is a compilation of songs from a selection of Whitley's past albums (Living with the Law (1991), Terra Incognita (1997), Dirt Floor (1998), Perfect Day (2000), Rocket House (2001), Pigs Will Fly (soundtrack) (2003), and Hotel Vast Horizon (2003)) and three new covers.

It was produced by Radio Bremen and recorded for 'Sparkasse in concert' on September 8, 2003, at Radio Bremen Sendesaal in Bremen, Germany by the Radio Bremen recording crew.

== Track listing ==
All tracks written by Chris Whitley unless otherwise noted.

1. "The Old Man and Me" (J. J. Cale) – 3:55
2. "Drifting" (Jimi Hendrix) – 2:44
3. "Kick the Stones" – 4:02
4. "Clear Blue Sky" – 5:07
5. "Light Rain" (traditional) – 4:07
6. "She's Alright" (McKinley Morganfield – Muddy Waters) – 4:23
7. "New Lost World" – 4:07
8. "To Joy (Revolution of the Innocents)" (Chris Whitley, Tony Mangurian) – 4:41
9. "The Crystal Ship" (John Densmore, Robby Krieger, Ray Manzarek, Jim Morrison – The Doors) – 3:22
10. "4th Time Around" (Bob Dylan) – 4:09
11. "Vertical Desert" – 4:00
12. "Hotel Vast Horizon" – 4:00
13. "Scrapyard Lullaby" – 4:16
14. "Phone Call from Leavenworth" – 4:42
15. "From a Photograph" – 3:44
16. "Shadowland" – 4:35
17. "Well...All Right" (Jerry Allison, Charles Hardin Holly, Joe Benson Mauldin, Norman Petty – The Crickets) – 4:05
18. "Velocity Girl" – 4:57

== Personnel ==
- Chris Whitley – guitar, vocals
