= Live at Martyrs' (album) =

Live album by Chris Whitley
- Released: May 16, 2000
- Recorded: August 12–14, 1999
- Genre: Rock
- Length: 47:25
- Label: Messenger Records
- Producer: John Alagía

Chris Whitley chronology
Dirt Floor (1998)	Live at Martyrs' (2000)	Perfect Day (2000)

Professional ratings
Review scores
Source	Rating
Allmusic	3.5/5 stars
Christgau's Consumer Guide	(neither)
Entertainment Weekly	B+

Live at Martyrs' is the fifth album by singer-songwriter and guitarist, Chris Whitley and his first live album. The performance is a compilation of songs from Whitley's first four albums (Living with the Law (1991), Din of Ecstasy (1995), Terra Incognita (1997), and Dirt Floor (1998)), a previous collaboration, and two songs that would later appear on Rocket House (2001).

It was produced by John Alagía and recorded over three consecutive nights in August 1999 at Martyrs' in Chicago, Illinois. It was co-mixed and co-engineered by Alagía and Jeff Juliano (assisted by Ken Helie) at Shelter Island Sound in New York City.

Whitley released the album independently and sold the CDs at his shows a year before the Messenger Records release.

== Track listing ==
All tracks written by Chris Whitley unless otherwise noted.

1. "Dirt Floor" – 2:11
2. "Long Way Around" – 4:01
3. "Firefighter" – 2:27
4. "God Thing" – 2:32
5. "Poison Girl" – 3:13
6. "New Machine" – 3:03
7. "Living with the Law" – 3:43
8. "WPL" – 2:52
9. "The Model" (Karl Bartos, Ralf Hütter, Emil Schult – Kraftwerk) – 3:01
10. "Home is Where You Get Across" – 3:22
11. "From One Island to Another" – 2:53
12. "Serve You" – 3:21
13. "Narcotic Prayer" – 3:51
14. "Big Sky Country" / "Gasket" – 6:55

== Personnel ==
- Chris Whitley – vocals, guitar, banjo, and boot
