= Long Way Around (album) =

Long Way Around – An Anthology: 1991–2001

Compilation album by Chris Whitley
- Released: September 3, 2002
- Recorded: 1991–2001
- Genre: Rock
- Length: 61:02
- Label: Columbia/Legacy
- Producer: Danny Kadar

Chris Whitley chronology
Rocket House (2001)	Long Way Around – An Anthology: 1991–2001 (2002)	Pigs Will Fly (soundtrack) (2003)

Professional ratings
Review scores
Source	Rating
Allmusic	link

Long Way Around – An Anthology: 1991–2001 is the eighth album by singer-songwriter and guitarist, Chris Whitley. It is his first compilation album and includes hits, album tracks, rarities, and unreleased demos from 1991 to 2001.

The compilation was produced by Danny Kadar and includes songs from Whitley's studio albums: Living with the Law (1991), Din of Ecstasy (1995), Terra Incognita (1997), Dirt Floor (1998), and Rocket House (2001) in their original, alternately mixed, or remixed form. Also included are four demos recorded live by David Kahne in 1992 at The Hit Factory in New York City after the Living with the Law tour. All of the material on this recording has been remastered from the original sources.

The album's title is taken from a song on Living with the Law.

== Track listing ==
All tracks written by Chris Whitley unless otherwise noted.

1. "Home is Where You Get Across" (demo) – 3:04
2. "Make the Dirt Stick" – 3:25
3. "Big Sky Country" – 4:39
4. "Weightless" (Daniel Lanois single remix) – 3:04
5. "Bordertown" – 4:11
6. "Bliss to Breakdown" (demo) – 3:01
7. "Aerial" (edit) – 3:44
8. "WPL" (alternate mix) – 3:01
9. "Narcotic Prayer" (alternate mix) – 3:49
10. "A Pint of Lotion" (demo) – 3:39
11. "Guns & Dolls" – 3:32
12. "Can't Get Off" – 4:08
13. "Cool Wooden Crosses" – 2:46
14. "Wild Country" – 3:08
15. "Accordingly" – 3:25
16. "Say Goodbye" (Chris Whitley, Tony Mangurian)
17. "Long Way Around" (demo) (hidden track) – 8:19

== Personnel ==
- Chris Whitley – vocal, National acoustic guitar, guitar, acoustic guitar, synth guitar, bass, foot, and co-production (4, 7, 8, 9, 11, 12, 13)

=== Additional personnel ===
- Alan Gevaert – bass (2, 8, 9, 11, 12)
- Steve Almaas – bass (4)
- Melvin Gibbs – bass (7)
- Bill Dillon – guitar and guitorgan (3), and pedal steel (2, 3)
- Daniel Lanois – mix, remix, and guitar solo (4)
- Ronald Jones – drums (2, 3, 5)
- Brian Blade – drums (4)
- Brady Blade – drum loop (7)
- Dougie Bowne – drums (7, 8, 9, 11, 12, 13)
- Tony Mangurian – drums, guitar, bass, and production (16)
- Stephen Barber – piano and keyboards (16)
- DJ Logic – turntables (16)
- Malcolm Burn – production (2, 3, 5)
- Toby Wright – co-production (4, 7, 13)
- John Custer – co-production (8, 9, 11, 12)
- Craig Street – production (14, 15)
