= Weed (album) =

Studio album by Chris Whitley
- Released: March 20, 2004
- Recorded: August 2003
- Genre: Blues
- Length: 59:35
- Label: Messenger Records
- Producer: Chris Whitley

Chris Whitley chronology
Hotel Vast Horizon (2003)	Weed (2004)	War Crime Blues (2004)

Professional ratings
Review scores
Source	Rating
Allmusic	3.5/5 stars

Weed is the tenth album by singer-songwriter and guitarist, Chris Whitley. It is his eighth studio album.

The album is Whitley's acoustic re-recording of a selection of songs he wrote from 1986 to 1996 for his three recordings on Columbia / Work Records: Living with the Law (1991), Din of Ecstasy (1995), and Terra Incognita (1997).

It was produced and recorded by Chris Whitley live to a two-track MD in Susann Bürger's bathroom / Sebnitzer Straße and Space House / Katharinenstraße in Dresden, Germany.

== Track listing ==
All tracks written by Chris Whitley:

1. "Power Down" – 3:43
2. "Living with the Law" – 4:05
3. "Know" – 3:16
4. "Phone Call from Leavenworth" – 4:22
5. "Cool Wooden Crosses" – 2:44
6. "Big Sky Country" – 4:26
7. "New Machine" – 3:19
8. "Clear Blue Sky" – 4:36
9. "Bordertown" – 3:16
10. "Narcotic Prayer" – 3:42
11. "Kick the Stones" – 4:11
12. "Weightless" – 2:37
13. "I Forget You Everyday" – 4:20
14. "Make the Dirt Stick" – 3:33
15. "Dust Radio" – 3:22
16. "Can't Get Off (instrumental)" – 3:57

== Personnel ==
- Chris Whitley – vocals, guitar, and foot stomp
