= Kenny Siegal =

American music producer and songwriter

Kenny Siegal is a Grammy Award-winning American music producer, songwriter, multi-instrumentalist, and recording engineer. In 2010, Siegal's only solo record, Eleccentricity, was nominated for IMA Eclectic Album of the Year.

== Career ==
Siegal has produced (and/or co-produced) many albums including Langhorne Slim and The Law's The Spirit Moves, The Way We Move (prominently featured on numerous films, television shows and national commercials), and Lost at Last Volumes 1 and 2, Chris Whitley's final record Reiter In, The Wiyos Twist, Spottiswoode & His Enemies 2011 Independent Music Award-winning Wild Goosechase Expedition and This is The Town: A Tribute to Nilsson featuring Langhorne Slim, Marco Benevento, Willy Mason, and many more.

Siegal won the Independent Music Award twice and has worked on songwriting assignments for Rick Rubin, produced tracks for Marshall Chess, Cheap Trick, has co-written with Paul Williams, and played guitar and sang on Tears for Fears' "Everybody Loves a Happy Ending." On the road, Kenny played bass and guitar with Amanda Palmer and Nervous Cabaret, and played with the Wiyos at Carnegie Hall and toured with them in the UK (playing lap steel, keys, and electric guitar).

Siegal co-produced, engineered, performed on, and added some co-writing to Lucky Diaz and The Family Jam Band’s Crayon Kids album which was nominated for Best Children’s Music Album at the 64th annual Grammys (2022), and again was nominated and won the 67th Annual GRAMMY Award (2025) as co-producer of Lucky Diaz and The Family Jam Band's "Brillo, Brillo!" in the Best Children's Music Album category.

== Johnny Society ==
In 1995, Siegal started Johnny Society, Johnny Society's first live performance was a showcase for Ray Davies of The Kinks who heard Siegal's basement recordings and requested to see the band live. All Music said about their first record: "It Don't Matter hits with the sonic force of a tidal wave, or to use a more appropriate analogy, like a one-band, end-of-the-20th-century rock & roll beacon the likes of which hasn't been experienced since the Beatles." Johnny Society's second record Wood was on music critic Ben Ratliff of The New York Times' top ten list of favorite records of 1999, praising Siegal's "unpretentious, utilitarian imagination," and "perfect little agonized rock songs." Siegal won The Independent Music Award for Best Producer (along with co-producers Bryce Goggin and Brian Geltner) for Johnny Society's 2012 release Free Society and Clairvoyance won Album of the Year at the Independent Music Awards in 2002. All of the Johnny Society records have been critically hailed, earning Siegal comparisons to John Lennon, David Bowie, Cheap Trick and The Lovin' Spoonful.
