= Heiko Schramm =

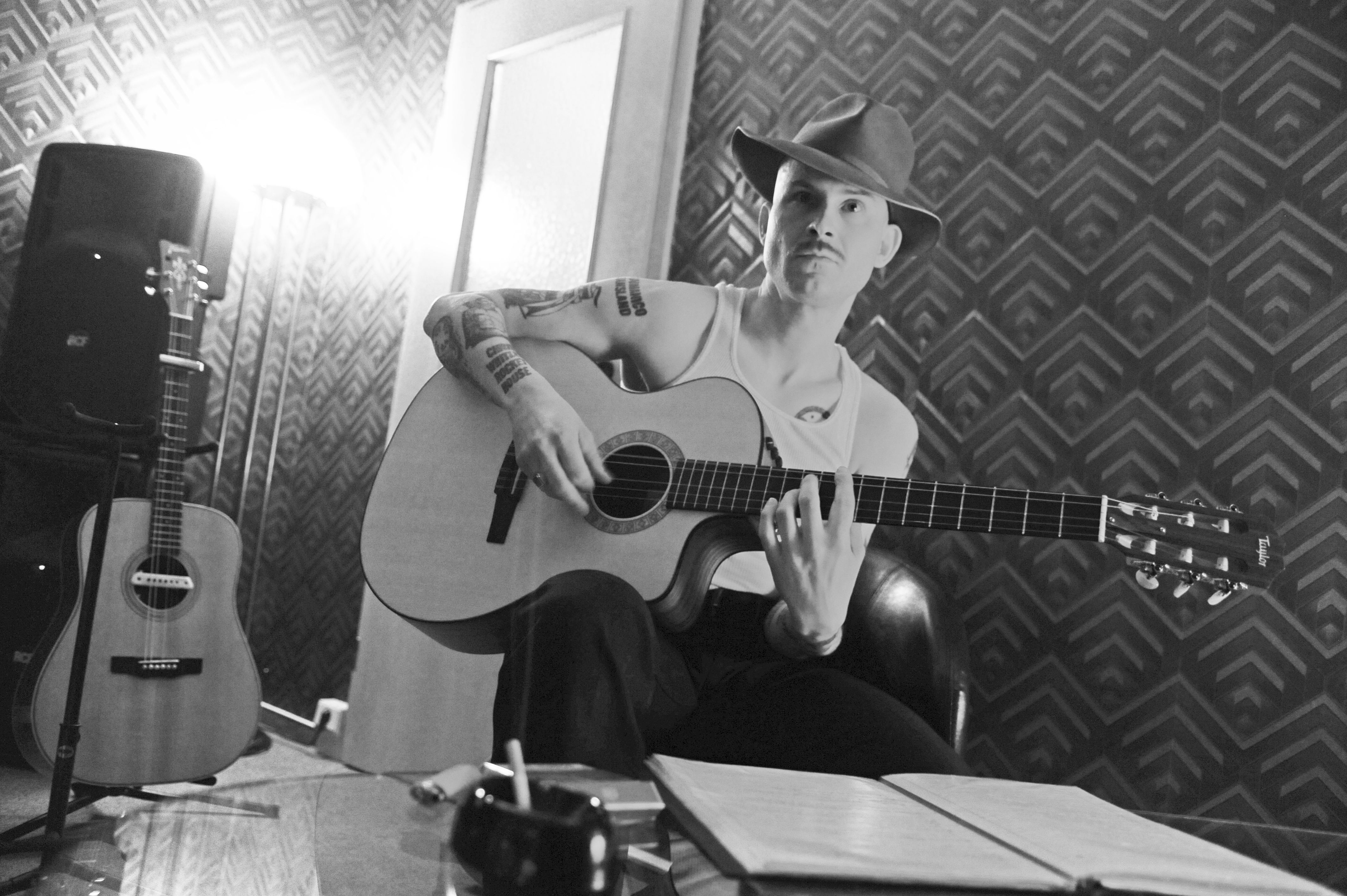

Background information
- Born: 8 June 1971; Dresden, Germany
- Genres: Alternative rock, blues rock, blues
- Occupations: Musician, songwriter
- Instruments: Bass guitar, double bass, guitar, vocals
- Years active: 1988–present
- Labels: Messenger, Rough Trade, Classic, ulfTone, Valley Entertainment, Red Parlour, Doxa
- Website: www.heikoheshschramm.com

Heiko Schramm (born 8 June 1971 in Dresden, Germany) is a German musician, singer/songwriter (bass guitar, double bass, and guitar) and writer.

== Career ==
Heiko Schramm started his musical career as the bassist for the Dresden-based band Freunde der italienischen Oper (FDIO) in 1988. Engaged for the stage production of Goethe's Faust at Staatsschauspiel Dresden in 1989, FDIO gained renown as the first rock band in the history of the state theater in 1991. Schramm collaborated on the FDIO albums Um Thron und Liebe as well as Edle Einfalt Stille Größe and left the band in 1992. Together with the original lineup, Schramm recorded a song for the German opera singer René Pape in 2005 which was featured in a documentary on Pape produced by the TV network Arte.

In 1990, Schramm, singer and guitarist Jens Berger and drummer Tom Wolf formed the band Need A New Drug. They recorded the albums Greedy Moon (1990) and Santa Cruz (1992, produced by Jorge Cousineau). The cooperation with Berger was formative for Schramm's forceful yet melodic guitar-like bass sound that evolved from a close collaboration on arrangements, as well as from the reduced form of a trio in which the bass functioned in more complex compositions as a transmitter between the rhythm section on the one hand, and as a second melodic option on the other.

Schramm moved to Berlin in 1993 and, together with Stephan Hachtmann and Ulrik Spiess, he formed the trio X.I.D., with which he recorded the albums X.I.D. (1994) and Stralsund (1995).

After his return to Dresden in 1996, Schramm and Berger started to work again and formed the band Gaffa. Although inspired both by blues musicians that were issued on Fat Possum Records and, e.g., Bukka White, Skip James, Jesse Fuller, the band's sound however reflected the tristesse of their East German suburban background with which they had been coming of age. With Gaffa, Schramm recorded the albums Wilful Things (2000, production by Edgar M. Roethig) and Amusement Park (2004), and left the band in 2004.

Parallelly, Schramm began teaming up with Rüdiger Pässler, drummer Matthias Macht and Matthias Petzold under the name of Thermoking in 1999. In the following year, they recorded the album Fuego produced by Jorge Cousineau and Matthias Petzold, and recorded by Edgar M. Roethig. The same production team monitored the subsequent album of the band which bore the new band name Goldoni after Pässler left in 2001.

Following an offer to set new music to the film Matrix and to perform it live including a DJ Team at the Dresden Kulturzentrum Scheune in 2000, Matthias Macht, Matthias Petzold, Schramm and DJ Studio 17 founded the band Tijuana Mon Amour Broadcasting Inc. The band existed beyond the instant success of their Scheune performance until 2009 and recorded the four albums, Tijuana Mona Amour Broadcasting Inc. (2001), Songs (2003), Day After, the Day Before (2004), and The Jubilee of the Snowqueen (2006).

In 2001, Schramm met American singer and guitarist Chris Whitley, who invited him to play bass on the US promotion tour for the album Rocket House. The tour lineup included also Tony Mangurian on drums (who also produced Rocket House), DJ Logic and keyboardist Etienne Lytle. Whitley and Schramm recorded the acoustic album Hotel Vast Horizon together with Matthias Macht in 2002. The song "Breaking Your Fall" featured on the album won the Independent Music Award in the category "Best Folk/Singer-Songwriter Song" in early 2004. The band promoted the album on an extended tour through the US as well as France and Belgium.

During the recording session for the soundtrack of the film Pigs Will Fly (direction: Eoin Moore, 2003), Schramm, Whitley and Macht worked with the producers Warner Poland and Kai-Uwe Kohlschmidt.

In 2004, the same lineup recorded Soft Dangerous Shores in Kingston, NY under the production of Malcolm Burn.

In 2005, Schramm played bass as a member of Chris Whitley & the Bastard Club in Catskill, NY during the recording sessions for the album Reiter In, which was recorded by Richard Holbrook and produced by Kenny Siegal. Additional performers on Whitley's last album included also: Brian Geltner, Tim Beattie, Kenny Siegal, Sean Balin, Gwen Snyder und Susann Buerger.

In 2008, Schramm and Matthias Macht toured the American Southwest together with Singer/Songwriter Paul Sprawl from Santa Cruz, California, and recorded the album Great American Opera at Studio Sutton Sound in Atascadero, CA.

Since 2009, Schramm has worked on his own songs under the name of Blenderman, performing them solo and with different musicians like Matthias Macht, Studio 17 and Fran Dango. Since 2014, the albums created in this period have been published as a series titled The 9th-Floor Tapes | 1-6, including Walk Down Memory Lane (2014) and To All The Locos (2014). In March 2016 followed God of Bitumen, the first album marked by the creative collaboration of Schramm and Dango in terms of music and lyrics. Further musicians next to Matthias Macht include e.g., Ralph Qno Kunze. The fourth album, a 4-track EP named Blenderman at Daft Audio was released in June 2016 followed by The Ralph in February 2017. The release of the EP The Thousand-Yard Stare in February 2018 concluded this series, again featuring musicians like Macht, Kunze, Studio 17 and Dango.

== Bands ==
- 1988–1992 Freunde der italienischen Oper
- 1990–1996 Need A New Drug
- 1993–1995 X.I.D.
- 1996–2004 Gaffa
- 1997–2000 Thermoking
- 2000–2001 Goldoni
- 2001–2005 Chris Whitley
- 2001–2008 Tijuana Mon Amour Broadcasting Inc.
- 2008–2009 Paul Sprawl / Worn Out West

== Discography ==
=== Freunde der italienischen Oper ===
- 1990 Tape Mutmaßliche Terroristen in Haft.../Gott schütze den Innenminister
- 1990 Tape Live in Munich
- 1991 Tape Il Grande Silenzio
- 1991 Tape Live im Schauspielhaus Dresden
- 1991 Tape Live in Dresden
- 1991 LP Um Thron Und Liebe
- 1996 CD Edle Einfalt Stille Größe (Strandard63)
- 1997 CD Um Thron Und Liebe (Strandard63 / What's So Funny About)
- 1997 CD-Box Rare, seltene und rätselhafte Aufnahmen mit Um Thron und Liebe / Edle Einfalt, stille Größe (Strandard63 / What's So Funny About)

=== Need a New Drug ===
- 1990 LP Greedy Moon (Par Excellence)
- 1992 LP/CD Santa Cruz (Berry Berry )

=== X.I.D. ===
- 1993 CD XID (Rough Trade)
- 1994 CD Stralsund (Rough Trade)

=== Gaffa ===
- 2000 LP/CD Wilful Things (DOXA Records)
- 2004 LP/CD Amusement Park (DOXA Records)

=== Thermoking ===
- 1999 CD Fuego (Väter & Söhne)

=== Goldoni ===
- 2001 CD Goldoni (Goo International)

=== Chris Whitley ===
- 2003 CD Pigs Will Fly (ulfTone Records)
- 2003 CD Hotel Vast Horizon (Messenger Records /Fargo Records)
- 2004 CD Soft Dangerous Shores (Messenger Records/Fargo Records)
- 2005 LP/CD Reiter In (Down Town Records /Red Parlour Records)

=== Tijuana Mon Amour Broadcasting Inc. ===
- 2001 LP/CD Tijuana Mon Amour Broadcasting Inc.(Tijuana Music/Hobby de Luxe)
- 2003 CD Songs (Tijuana Music/Hobby de Luxe)
- 2004 CD Day After, the Day Before (DOXA Records/Remixes)
- 2006 LP/CD The Jubilee of the Snowqueen (BURO/City Center Offices)

=== Paul Sprawl/ Worn Out West ===
- 2009 CD Great American Opera

=== Blenderman/HESH ===
- 2014: To Walk Down Memory Lane (Download)
- 2014: To All The Locos (Download)
- 2016: God of Bitumen (Download)
- 2016: Blenderman at Daft Audio (Download)
- 2017: The Ralph (Download)
- 2018: The Thousand-Yard Stare (Download)

== FDIO on TV ==
- ARTE: Der Bass René Pape – Mein Herz brennt, direction: Sibylle Muth
