= Reiter In =

Studio album by Chris Whitley
- Released: March 28, 2006
- Recorded: June 1–3 and 5, 2005
- Genre: Rock
- Length: 51:32
- Label: Red Parlor Records
- Producer: Kenny Siegal

Chris Whitley chronology
Soft Dangerous Shores (2005)	Reiter In (2006)	Dislocation Blues (2006)

Professional ratings
Review scores
Source	Rating
Allmusic	4/5 stars
Contactmusic.com	4/5 stars
Stylus Magazine	B

Reiter In is the thirteenth album by singer-songwriter and guitarist, Chris Whitley. It is his eleventh studio album and the last he made before his death (five months later, at 45) in November 2005.

The album was recorded as a band effort and is billed as "Chris Whitley & The Bastard Club" and released posthumously in 2006.

Kenny Siegal (of Johnny Society) produced, co-wrote, and played on the album. It was recorded all analog and live on a two-inch tape Sony MCI JH24 tape deck through a Trident board at Old Soul Studios in Catskill, New York. It was mixed by John Holbrook.

Whitley had returned to New York in the spring of 2005, because he was offered a US club tour, which he accepted even though his health was declining. While in NYC he faced eviction from his apartment while he made the record.

== Track listing ==
All tracks written by Chris Whitley unless otherwise noted.

1. "I Wanna Be Your Dog" (Dave Alexander, Ron Asheton, Scott Asheton, Iggy Pop – The Stooges) – 4:08
2. "Bring It On Home" (Willie Dixon – Sonny Boy Williamson II) – 3:43
3. "Inn" (Brian Geltner, Chris Whitley) – 4:06
4. "Mountain Side" (Wayne Coyne, Jonathan Donahue, Michael Ivins, Nathan Roberts – The Flaming Lips) – 5:15
5. "Cut the Cards" (Tim Beattie) – 4:38
6. "I'm in Love with a German Film Star" (Mitch Barker, Barbara Gogan, Clive Temperley, Claire Bidwell, Richard Williams – The Passions) – 4:28
7. "Are 'Friends' Electric?" (Gary Numan) – 5:11
8. "Reiter In" – 5:16
9. "I Go Evil" (Chris Whitley, Kenny Siegal) – 4:30
10. "All Beauty Taken from You in This Life Remains Forever" (Chris Whitley, Kenny Siegal) – 7:04
11. "Come Home" (Heiko Schramm) – 3:19

== Personnel ==
- Chris Whitley – lead vocals and guitars
- Heiko Schramm – bass guitar and backing vocals
- Brian Geltner – drums, vibes, acoustic guitar, and backing vocals
- Tim Beattie – harmonica, lap steel, and backing vocals
- Kenny Siegal – baritone guitar, electric guitar, acoustic guitar, and backing vocals
- Sean Balin – violin
- Gwen Snyder – vocals and tambourine
- Susann Bürger – spoken word
