= 2nd Floor =

2nd Floor most commonly refers to:

- 2nd Floor (Nina song), 2002
- 2nd Floor (The Creatures song), 1998

2nd Floor or Second Floor may also refer to:

- "2nd Floor", a 2003 song by Vic Chesnutt from Silver Lake (album)
- "Second Floor", a 2014 song by Cat System Corp. from Palm Mall
- "Second Floor", a 2014 song by Cheap Girls from Famous Graves
- "Second Floor", a 2010 song by Foxy Shazam from Foxy Shazam (album)
- "Second Floor", a 1998 song by Edsilia Rombley
- Second Floor, the Japanese version of the 1994 Cantonese album 2nd Floor Black Suite by Beyond (band)
- Second Floor, a 2002 album by Shadows of Steel
- Second Floor, a 2015 short film directed by Andreina Pérez Aristeiguieta
- "Second Floor", the second chapter of the 2007 fourth volume of the manga Fairy Tail
