= Living with the Law =

Living with the Law may refer to:

- Living with the Law (album), a 1991 album by Chris Whitley
- "Living with the Law" (song), the title song from the album
