= Black Dub (disambiguation) =

Black Dub is a 2010 album by musical group Black Dub.

Black Dub may also refer to:

- Black Dub (stream), a stream in England which runs from Langrigg to Allonby Bay
- Black Dub, part of the Snaefell Mountain Course used for TT and Manx Grand Prix motorcycle racing
