= Blue Light 'til Dawn =

Studio album by Cassandra Wilson
- Released: November 2, 1993
- Studio: Greene St. Recording, RPM Studios, Sear Sound and Sound On Sound (New York City, New York)
- Genre: Jazz, blues
- Length: 56:05
- Label: Blue Note
- Producer: Craig Street

Cassandra Wilson chronology
Dance to the Drums Again (1992)	Blue Light 'til Dawn (1993)	New Moon Daughter (1995)

Professional ratings
Review scores
Source	Rating
AllMusic	5/5 stars
The Buffalo News	4/4 stars
Robert Christgau	(1-star Honorable Mention)
The Encyclopedia of Popular Music	4/5 stars
The Penguin Guide to Jazz	3/4 stars
The Rolling Stone Jazz & Blues Album Guide	4/5 stars
Tom Hull	B

Blue Light 'til Dawn is a studio album by American jazz singer Cassandra Wilson. Her first album on the Blue Note label, it was released in 1993. It contains Wilson's interpretations of songs by various blues and rock artists, as well as three original compositions. The album marked a shift in Wilson’s recording style, mostly dropping the electric instruments of her earlier albums in favor of acoustic arrangements. A critical and commercial breakthrough, the album was re-released in 2014 with three bonus tracks recorded live somewhere in Europe during the Blue Light 'til Dawn Tour.

== Background ==
As of March 1996, the album sold over 250 000 copies. While recording the album, Wilson's father, jazz bassist Herman Fowlkes, died. In an interview for New York Magazine Wilson explained that the album's name refers to a certain time of night. Says Wilson "At a party you have a blue light to have a certain vibe. The title refers to that light, that blue, giving way to the dawn. It's after after hours, the predawn twilight".

== Reception ==
Rolling Stone reviewer John Milward gave the album three and a half stars out of five. He praised Wilson's choice of blues tracks by Robert Johnson and guitarist Brandon Ross' arrangements. He also liked Wilson's title track, but was less fond of her interpretations of Joni Mitchell's "Black Crow" or Ann Peebles' "I Can't Stand the Rain". Ron Wynn of Allmusic gave the album a rating of five stars out of five. In contrast to Milward, he enjoyed Wilson's "piercing version" of "I Can't Stand the Rain". The Buffalo News review by Jeff Simon noted, "When the disc is good... it makes the disc hard to get off your turntable. It's erratic, though, with some of her headstrong notions panning out less well than others. At its best, though, it's sublime."

== Track listing ==
1. "You Don't Know What Love Is" (Gene DePaul, Don Raye) — 6:05
2. "Come On in My Kitchen" (Robert Johnson) — 4:53
3. "Tell Me You'll Wait for Me" (Charles Brown, Oscar Moore) — 4:48
4. "Children of the Night" (Thom Bell, Linda Creed) — 5:19
5. "Hellhound on My Trail" (Johnson) — 4:34
6. "Black Crow" (Joni Mitchell) — 4:38
7. "Sankofa" (Cassandra Wilson) — 2:02
8. "Estrellas" (Cyro Baptista) — 1:59
9. "Redbone" (Wilson) — 5:35
10. "Tupelo Honey" (Van Morrison) — 5:36
11. "Blue Light 'til Dawn" (Wilson) — 5:09
12. "I Can't Stand the Rain" (Don Bryant, Bernard Miller, Ann Peebles) — 5:27

Bonus live tracks of the 2014 re-issue

13. "Black Crow" (Joni Mitchell) — 6:30
14. "Skylark" (Johnny Mercer, Hoagy Carmichael) — 8:40
15. "Tupelo Honey" (Van Morrison) — 7:13

== Personnel ==
Musicians

- Cassandra Wilson – vocals (1–6, 8–12), voices (7)
- Tony Cedras – accordion (2)
- Brandon Ross – steel string guitar (1, 5, 10), octave guitar (2, 4), classical guitar (4)
- Gib Wharton – pedal steel guitar (8, 9)
- Chris Whitley – national resophonic guitar (12)
- Kenny Davis – bass (2, 3, 11)
- Lonnie Plaxico – bass (10)
- Lance Carter – drums (2), percussion (4, 6), snares (10)
- Kevin Johnson – snare (3), percussion (4, 6, 10)
- Vinx – percussion (4, 6), voices (4)
- Cyro Baptista – percussion (6, 8, 9, 11)
- Jeff Haynes – percussion (6, 8, 9, 11)
- Bill McClellan – percussion (6), drums (11)
- Olu Dara – cornet (5)
- Don Byron – clarinet (6)
- Charlie Burnham – violin (1, 10, 11), mandocello (10)

Music arrangements

- Brandon Ross – arrangements (1, 2, 4, 5, 10)
- Kenny Davis – arrangements (3)
- Cyro Baptista – arrangements (6, 8)
- Cassandra Wilson – arrangements (7, 12)
- Charles Burnham – arrangements (11)
- Chris Whitley – co-arrangements (12)

== Production ==
- Craig Street – producer
- Cynthia Simmons – production assistant
- Mark Larson – art direction, design
- Chris Callis – photography
- Christina Kumi Kimble – stylist

Technical credits

- Wally Traugott – mastering at Capitol Studios (Hollywood, California)
- Danny Kopelson – mixing (1–11), recording (2–9, 11)
- Jamie Staub – recording (1, 10), additional recording
- Jimmy Douglass – additional recording, recording (12), mixing (12)
- Peter Beekerman – assistant engineer
- Dinji Brown – assistant engineer
- Joe Hogan – assistant engineer
- Fred Kervorkian – assistant engineer, editing, sequencing
- Julio Peralta – assistant engineer

== Chart performance ==
Chart (1994)	Peak position
US Jazz Albums (Billboard)	10
