= Soft Dangerous Shores =

Studio album by Chris Whitley
- Released: July 26, 2005
- Recorded: 2005
- Genre: Rock
- Length: 41:07
- Label: Messenger Records
- Producer: Malcolm Burn

Chris Whitley chronology
War Crime Blues (2004)	Soft Dangerous Shores (2005)	Reiter In (2006)

Professional ratings
Review scores
Source	Rating
All About Jazz	4/5 stars
Allmusic	3.5/5 stars
PopMatters	8/10
Slant Magazine	4/5 stars

Soft Dangerous Shores is the twelfth album by singer-songwriter and guitarist, Chris Whitley. It is his tenth studio album.

Malcolm Burn produced, mixed, and played on the album. It was recorded by Burn in Kingston, New York.

He recorded the album in 2 weeks and "basically wrote a song a day".

== Track listing ==
All tracks written by Chris Whitley.

1. "Fireroad (for Two)" – 3:26
2. "Soft Dangerous Shores" – 4:10
3. "As Day is Long" – 3:30
4. "Valley of the Innocents" – 3:28
5. "City of Women" – 6:36
6. "Times Square Machine (N.Y.C. February 1991)" – 0:54
7. "Her Furious Angels" – 3:11
8. "Last Million Miles" – 4:21
9. "Medicine Wheel" – 4:33
10. "End Game Holiday" – 4:22
11. "Breath of Shadows" – 3:53
12. [unnamed] – 0:18

== Personnel ==
- Chris Whitley – vocals, guitars, and banjo
- Heiko Schramm – bass guitars
- Matthias Macht – drums and percussion
- Malcolm Burn – keyboards, programming, and processing

=== Additional personnel ===
- Trixie Whitley – vocals (9)
- Dan Whitley – guitar (1, 2)
- Aaron Comess – drums (8)
