= Long Way Around =

Long Way Around may refer to:

- "The Long Way Around", a 2006 song by the Dixie Chicks
- Long Way Around (album), an album by Chris Whitley
- "Long Way Around", a song by Eagle-Eye Cherry from the album Living in the Present Future
- "Long Way Around", a song by Parliament from the album Trombipulation

== See also ==
- Long Way Round, a British television series and book documenting Ewan McGregor and Charley Boorman's motorcycle journey
