= New Moon Daughter =

Studio album by Cassandra Wilson
- Released: 1995
- Studios: Turtle Creek Barn at Bearsville Studios (Woodstock, New York); Sound On Sound and Sear Sound (New York City, New York); BearTracks Studios (Suffern, New York
- Genres: Jazz, blues
- Length: 61:26
- Label: Blue Note
- Producer: Craig Street

Cassandra Wilson chronology
Blue Light 'til Dawn (1993)	New Moon Daughter (1995)	Rendezvous (1997)

New Moon Daughter is a studio album by American jazz singer Cassandra Wilson that was released by Blue Note in 1995. The album reached No. 1 on the Billboard magazine jazz album chart and also won the Grammy Award as the Best Jazz Vocal Performance.

== Background ==
In an interview for New York magazine, Wilson explained that the album's name comes from an old Ashanti proverb—"Sickness comes with the waning moon; the new moon cures disease". The album contains twelve songs, five of which were written by Wilson.

== Reception ==
Professional ratings
Review scores
Source	Rating
AllMusic	4.5/5 stars
DownBeat	5/5 stars
Entertainment Weekly	A−
The Guardian	4/5 stars
Houston Chronicle	4/5 stars
Los Angeles Times	3.5/4 stars
The Penguin Guide to Jazz	3/4 stars
Rolling Stone	4/5 stars
The Rolling Stone Album Guide	4.5/5 stars
The Village Voice	B−

Critical reception to New Moon Daughter was highly positive, with many critics comparing it favorably to its widely-celebrated predecessor, Blue Light 'til Dawn, and hailing it as one of the year's best. Gary Giddins wrote in 2008 for The New Yorker that both albums "uncovered her Mississippi roots, hardly noted in her earlier work, and freed her to revisit more recent pop songs, from the Monkees to U2...She also emerged as a nonpareil blues singer—a natural, reclaiming the Delta tradition of Robert Johnson and Son House. Even today, those albums convey the excitement of an artist coming into her own, testing her mettle and rejoicing in its supple strength."

Howard Reich of The Chicago Tribune wrote that "Blue Light 'til Dawn was so original and haunting that one wondered whether the singer would be able to match it with her next release. Somehow, she not only has equalled the classic 1993 recording but has topped it with an even more daring album. Like its predecessor, New Moon Daughter explores a broad range of musical influences...yet Wilson bridges all of these idioms, and then some, with the incantatory nature of her phrasing, the deep amber quality of her alto and the lush and exotic instrumentation that has marked her work in recent years."

Regarding her choice to include more pop material, Peter Margasak of The Chicago Reader argued that "whereas jazzers feebly covered Beatles tunes three decades ago, Wilson transforms these covers to fit her own aesthetic. Her take on U2’s Love Is Blindness turned the song into a sumptuous evocation of luminous, primordial sorrow, sculpting a highly original, moving piece of sensual beauty."

A reviewer for Gramophone was generally positive about the album, praising Wilson's voice and her interpretations of the standards included. However, they said that compared to the originals, Wilson's versions may not be as powerful. They noted that with this album, Wilson appears to move away "from jazz heartlands or cutting edges and towards the embrace of 'pop cult' status." The reviewer particularly enjoyed "Skylark" (calling it "sublime") and "Last Train to Clarksville" ("a delight").

In a positive review of the album, Rolling Stone's Geoffrey Himes noted its similarity to Wilson's previous album Blue Light 'til Dawn, but added that New Moon Daughter has more feeling and a darker tone. He wrote that Wilson makes Billie Holiday's "Strange Fruit" "her own". Himes noted the album's overall slow tempo as a weakness, wishing for a little more rhythmic diversity. Scott Yanow of AllMusic described Wilson's voice on the album as "quite bored and emotionally detached" but noted that she was "stretching herself".

Village Voice critic Robert Christgau was less impressed, claiming that too many jazz singers like Wilson "have trouble figuring out what to make of their material" and arguing "most of these songs escape her attentions without a mark on them. Which isn't to mention the 'Strange Fruit' that establishes the surpassing weirdness of Billie's original, or the disastrous Monkees cover, designed to prove [Wilson] has a sense of humor I'm now convinced isn't there."

== Appearances in other media ==
The song "Death Letter" from the album was used as an opening theme in the third season of television series True Detective, released in 2019.

== Track listing ==
No.	Title	Writer(s)	Length
1.	"Strange Fruit"	Lewis Allan	5:33
2.	"Love Is Blindness"	Bono, Adam Clayton, The Edge, Larry Mullen, Jr.	4:53
3.	"Solomon Sang"	Cassandra Wilson	5:56
4.	"Death Letter"	Son House	4:12
5.	"Skylark"	Hoagy Carmichael, Johnny Mercer	4:08
6.	"Find Him"	Wilson	4:37
7.	"I'm So Lonesome I Could Cry"	Hank Williams	4:50
8.	"Last Train to Clarksville"	Tommy Boyce, Bobby Hart	5:15
9.	"Until"	Wilson	6:29
10.	"A Little Warm Death"	Wilson	5:43
11.	"Memphis"	Wilson	5:04
12.	"Harvest Moon"	Neil Young	5:01

Japanese bonus track
No.	Title	Writer(s)	Length
13.	"Moon River"	Johnny Mercer, Henry Mancini	5:22

EMI Digital (2003) bonus track
No.	Title	Writer(s)	Length
13.	"32-20 Blues"	Robert Johnson	5:23

== Personnel ==
Musicians

- Cassandra Wilson – vocals, acoustic guitar (6)
- Tony Cedras – accordion (9)
- Gary Breit – Hammond B3 organ (11)
- Chris Whitley – resonator guitar (1)
- Kevin Breit – acoustic guitar (2, 3), resonator guitar (2, 3, 12), electric guitar (4, 8), tenor banjo (4), bouzouki (7), electric lead guitar (11)
- Brandon Ross – acoustic guitar (2–4, 7–10, 12), octave guitar (2, 6, 9, 13), electric rhythm guitar (11)
- Gib Wharton – pedal steel guitar (5)
- Lonnie Plaxico – bass (1, 2, 5–9, 11)
- Mark Peterson – bass (4, 12)
- Dougie Bowne – floor tom (2), drums (3–5, 7, 8), percussion (4, 12, 13), vibraphone (8), whistling (12)
- Cyro Baptista – percussion (3, 4, 10–13), Jew's harp (4), shaker (9)
- Jeff Haynes – bongos (9), percussion (10)
- Graham Haynes – cornet (1)
- Butch Morris – cornet (2)
- Charles Burnham – violin (7, 10)
- The "Peepers" – backing vocals (12)

=== Production ===
- Craig Street – producer
- Cassandra Wilson – basic track arrangements and "wack tuning" (1, 3–8, 10, 11, 13), arrangements (4)
- Brandon Ross – arrangements (2, 4, 9, 12), voice arrangements (10)
- Danny Kopelson – recording, mixing
- John Chiarolanzo – assistant engineer
- Bil Emmons – assistant engineer
- Scott Gormley – assistant engineer
- Fred Kervorkian – assistant engineer, editing
- Steve Regina – assistant engineer
- John Reigart – assistant engineer
- Tom Schick – assistant engineer
- Greg Calbi – mastering at Masterdisk (New York, NY)
- David Mayenfisch – photography
- Nick Berkeley – graphic design
- Hector Castro – stylist
- Dream Street Management, Inc. – direction

== Chart positions ==
Year	Chart	Position
1996	Billboard Top Jazz Albums	1
1996	Billboard The Billboard 200	141
1996	Billboard Heatseekers	9
