= War Crime Blues =

Studio album by Chris Whitley
- Released: March 20, 2004
- Recorded: 2003
- Genre: Rock
- Length: 33:23
- Label: Messenger
- Producer: Chris Whitley

Chris Whitley chronology
Weed (2004)	War Crime Blues (2004)	Soft Dangerous Shores (2005)

Professional ratings
Review scores
Source	Rating
Allmusic	4.5/5 stars
Houston Chronicle	4/5 stars
Uncut	2/5 stars

War Crime Blues is the eleventh album by singer-songwriter and guitarist, Chris Whitley. It is his ninth studio album.

It was produced by Whitley. The album was recorded by Edgar M. Röthig at Helicopter Studio in Dresden, Germany.

Additional recording was done by Susann Bürger under Albert Bridge in Dresden, Germany ("Invisible Day") and by Chris Whitley at the Nadaud Hotel in Paris, France ("The Call Up").

"Her Furious Angels" won Best Blues/R&B Song at the 4th Annual Independent Music Awards.

== Track listing ==
All tracks written by Chris Whitley unless otherwise noted:

1. "Made From Dirt" – 2:49
2. "Her Furious Angels" – 2:53
3. "Ghost Dance" – 3:49
4. "War Crime Blues" – 2:39
5. "Invisible Day" – 4:08
6. "I Can't Stand It" (Lou Reed) – 2:51
7. "White Rider" – 3:23
8. "Dead Cowboy Song" – 2:43
9. "The Call Up" (Topper Headon, Mick Jones, Joe Strummer – The Clash) – 4:16
10. "God Left Town" – 2:16
11. "Nature Boy" (eden ahbez – Nat King Cole) – 1:29

== Personnel ==
- Chris Whitley – vocals, guitar, and foot stomp
