= Hotel Vast Horizon =

Studio album by Chris Whitley
- Released: April 1, 2003
- Recorded: December 16–22, 2002
- Genre: Rock
- Length: 37:02
- Label: Messenger
- Producers: Heiko Schramm, Chris Whitley, Matthias Macht, and Edgar M. Röthig

Chris Whitley chronology
Pigs Will Fly (soundtrack) (2002)	Hotel Vast Horizon (2003)	Weed (2003)

Professional ratings
Review scores
Source	Rating
AllMusic	3/5 stars
Gaffa	3/6 stars
Stylus Magazine	B+
Uncut	1/5 stars

Hotel Vast Horizon is the ninth album by singer-songwriter and guitarist Chris Whitley. It is his seventh studio album.

It was produced by Heiko Schramm, Chris Whitley, Matthias Macht, and Edgar M. Röthig. The album was recorded by Röthig at Helicopter Studio in Dresden, Germany. It has been dubbed "a Chris Whitley unplugged-trio German-winter album", [...] a quiet acoustic record that is nonetheless discernibly rock in inclination, not folk".

"Breaking Your Fall" won Best Folk/Singer-Songwriter Song at the 3rd Annual Independent Music Awards.

== Track listing ==
All tracks written by Chris Whitley unless otherwise noted:

1. "New Lost World" – 4:24
2. "Breaking Your Fall" (Chris Whitley, Warner Poland, Kai-Uwe Kohlschmidt) – 3:23
3. "Frontier" – 4:43
4. "Hotel Vast Horizon" – 3:54
5. "Blues for André" – 2:52
6. "Assassin Song" – 3:56
7. "Wide Open Return" – 3:06
8. "Silhouette" – 4:26
9. "Insurrection at Newtown" – 3:33
10. "Free Interval" – 2:40

== Trivia ==
- Part of a song verse in "Hotel Vast Horizon" references 'The Castle of the Poor', by French poet, Paul Éluard.
- "Blues for André" refers to French writer, poet, and surrealist theorist, André Breton.

== Personnel ==
- Chris Whitley – vocals, guitar, and banjo
- Heiko Schramm – electric bass and acoustic bass
- Matthias Macht – drums and percussion
