= Mark Howard (producer) =

- Mark Howard Berlin 2007

Background information
- Born: 8 June 1964 (age 62); Manchester, England
- Genres: Experimental, rock, ambient, folk, country, blues
- Occupations: Record producer, Engineer

Mark Howard (born June 8, 1964 in Manchester, England) is a Canadian record producer, engineer, and mixer, who has worked with artists including Bob Dylan, Tom Waits, The Tragically Hip, Lucinda Williams, Willie Nelson, Marianne Faithfull, Emmylou Harris, U2, Peter Gabriel, R.E.M., Neil Young, Kaizers Orchestra, Lucky Dube, Fiona Apple and The Neville Brothers. Records produced and engineered by Howard have sold an estimated 70 million units worldwide, and have been streamed approximately 3 billion times.

== Career ==
Howard began his career in Hamilton, Ontario, mixing shows in local clubs, and touring across Canada with King Biscuit Boy. After a motorbike accident which left him unable to lift heavy equipment, he began working as an assistant at Grant Avenue Studios. In 1986, while working at Grant Avenue Studio, he met Daniel Lanois and began working on his solo album, Acadie. Lanois invited him to New Orleans to help set up a studio and begin work on The Neville Brothers album Yellow Moon, beginning a 23-year-long musical partnership. Howard worked on mixing, recording and engineering, as well as studio installations. They had studios in New Orleans, Kingsway, Emila Court on St Charles Ave, and a Victorian mansion at 1305 Soniat St, Mexico, and in San Francisco. In 1987, Howard recorded the Neville Brothers' Yellow Moon at Emila Court. In 1989, Bob Dylan's Oh Mercy was recorded on Soniat St.

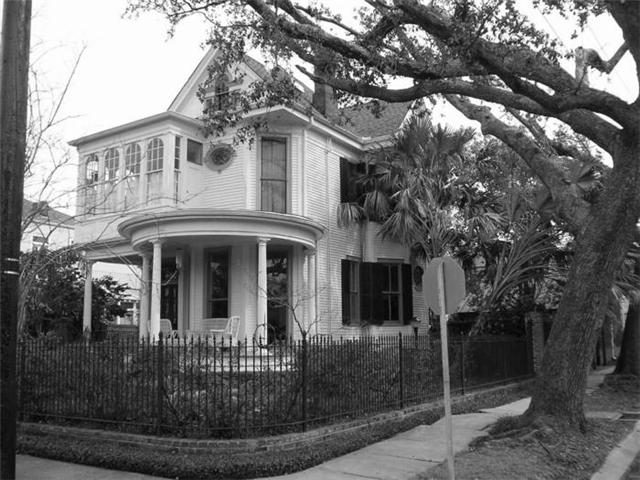
This is the house on Soniat St, New Orleans where Bob Dylan's Oh Mercy was recorded in April, 1989 by Mark Howard.

Howard then recorded and mixed Daniel Lanois' debut solo album Acadie. In 1990, Howard recorded Chris Whitley's debut album, Living with the Law at Kingsway Studio and in 1991 recorded and mixed Lanois' second album For the Beauty of Wynona. In 1991, Mark began work on R.E.M.'s Automatic for the People. Whilst at Kingsway Howard worked on records for the Neville Brothers (Brother's Keeper), Peter Gabriel (Us), R.E.M. (Monster), Harold Budd (By the Dawn of the Early Light), and Iggy Pop (American Caesar).

In 1993, Howard went solo as a producer, producing The Tragically Hip's Day for Night. He was nominated at the Canadian Juno awards for producer of the year. In 1994, Howard worked on post-production for Emmylou Harris's Wrecking Ball at the studio he shared with Lanois in San Francisco. That same year, Howard recorded tracks for Lucky Dube at Peter Gabriel's Real World Studios. Howard is credited as a producer on Dube's work, specifically on the 1994 compilation album A Week Or Two In The Real World.

Howard then opened a studio called the Teatro, in Oxnard, California, in an abandoned 1920s theatre. At this studio Howard and Lanois co-produced the soundtrack to the movie Slingblade, and Howard then produced Chris Whitley's Terra Incognita. In 1995, Howard co-produced with Ian Moore the latter's second studio album, Modernday Folklore.

In 1996, Bob Dylan began work with Howard and Lanois on Time Out of Mind at the Teatro, and recorded at Miami's Criteria Studios for a month before returning to the Teatro to finish recording the album. The record went on to win three Grammys, including Album of the Year. In Dylan's acceptance speech, he thanked Mark Howard, commenting that "we got a particular sound on this record which you don't get every day".

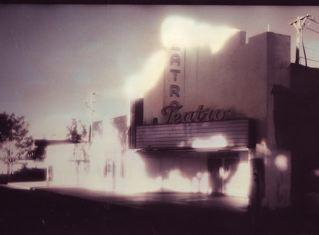
The Teatro studio in Oxnard, California, an abandoned theatre that Howard turned into a recording studio.

In 1997, Howard and Lanois recorded Willie Nelson's Teatro, named after the studio. In July 1998, Howard produced Marianne Faithfull's, Vagabond Ways. Faithfull was introduced to Howard by Bob Dylan, who said to her that "You know Marianne, people like us with funny voices, you have to be very careful who you let produce you."

U2 was the last band to record with Howard and Lanois at the Teatro, recording some of All That You Can't Leave Behind.

After the Teatro Howard created his own studio at the Paramour Estate in Silver Lake, Los Angeles, which was originally owned by actor and director Antonio Mareno. At Paramour, Howard produced the Lucinda Williams album, World Without Tears, which was nominated for a Grammy award. Whilst at the Paramour Howard produced Vic Chesnutt Silver lake, a track with Eddie Vedder for soundtrack of the movie, I Am Sam, and the beginnings of Tom Waits Real Gone. Howard finished Real Gone at an old school house in northern California.

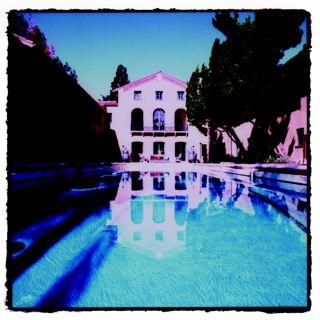
The Paramour Estate in Silver Lake, Los Angeles

== Discography ==
P=Produced / E=Engineered / M=Mixed / R=Recorded

- Courtney Marie Andrews, May Your Kindness Remain (Fat Possum) E/M
- Bob Dylan, Time Out of Mind (Columbia) R/M
- Bob Dylan, Oh Mercy (Columbia) R
- Tom Waits, Various Tracks from Orphans (Anti) R/M
- Tom Waits, Real Gone (Epitaph) R/M
- Neil Young, Le Noise (Warner) R/M
- Marianne Faithfull, Vagabond Ways (Virgin) P/R/M
- Lucinda Williams, World Without Tears (Lost Highway) P/R/M
- Emmylou Harris, Wrecking Ball (Asylum) R/M
- Willie Nelson, Teatro (Island) R/M
- U2, All That You Can't Leave Behind (Interscope) E
- U2, "Ground Beneath Her Feet" from R/M Million Dollar Hotel Soundtrack (Island)
- Iggy Pop, Avenue B (Virgin) R/M
- Iggy Pop, American Caesar (Virgin) R/M
- Red Hot Chili Peppers, Californication Singles (Warner Bros) R/M
- R.E.M., Automatic for the People (I.R.S.) R
- R.E.M., Monster (Warner Bros) R
- The Tragically Hip, Day for Night (MCA) P/R/M
- Ian Thornley, Secrets (Anthem) P/R/M
- Ricki Lee Jones, 3 Tracks on ‘The Evening Of My Best Day’ (V2) M
- Ricki Lee Jones, The Other Side of Desire (30 Tiger) P/R/M
- Peter Gabriel, US (Geffen) R
- Daniel Lanois, Acadie (Warner Bros) R/M
- Daniel Lanois, For The Beauty of Wynona (Warner Bros) R/M
- Daniel Lanois, For The Beauty of Wynona (Warner Bros) R/M
- K.D. Lang, Anywhere but Here soundtrack. (Atlantic) M
- Robbie Robertson, Storyville (Geffen) R
- The Neville Brothers, Brothers Keeper (A&M) R
- Chris Whitley, Living with the Law (Columbia) R
- All the Pretty Horses Film Soundtrack (Sony) R/M
- Sling Blade Oscar-winning film soundtrack (Island) P/R/M
- Kaizers Orchestra, Maskineri (Constanze DA) P
- Sharon Little, Perfect Time for a Breakdown (CBS Records) Co-P
- Augie March, Moo, You Bloody Choir (Sony BMG Music, Aus) M
- Jackie Bristow, (Craving Records) P/M
- Sam Roberts, (Universal Canada) P/M
- Amy Corriea, Lakeville (Nettwerk America) R/Co-P/M
- Ricki Lee Jones, 3 Tracks on ‘The Evening Of My Best Day’ (V2) M
- Colin James, Traveler (Warner Canada) P/R/M
- Vic Chesnutt, Silver Lake (New West) P/R/M
- Bastard Sons of Johnny Cash, Bastard Sons Of Johnny Cash (Ultimatum) P
- Ana Victoria Tracks for Forthcoming Album (Arista) R
- Avril Lavigne, "Complicated" R "Sk8ter Boi" R "I’m With You" R From Let Go (Arista)
- The Waifs, Up All Night (Jarrah) R/M
- Arid, At The Close Of Every Day (Sony Music Benelux) P/R/M
- I Am Sam, 1 track from OMPS Sdtrk. "You've Got To Hide Your Love Away" by Eddie Vedder (V2) R/M
- Diane Tell, Tout De (BMG International) R
- Natalie Imbruglia, White Lilies Island (BMG) R
- The Ulfuls, (Toshiba/EMI) P/R/M
- Chris Whitley, Terra Incognita (Work Group) P/R/M
- Scott Weiland, Twelve Bar Blues (Atlantic) M
- Sub-Bionic, Forthcoming Album (Extasy) P/R/M
- Tito & Tarantula, (cockroach) P/R
- Holly McNarland, Forthcoming release (Universal) P/R/M
- Tim Gibbons, Shylingo (Real Records) P/R/M
- Daryl Johnson, Shake (Real World) P/R/M
- Ian Moore, Modernday Folklore (Capricorn) P/R/M
- Marva Wright, Tipitina's (Tipitina's) P/R/M
- Shannon McNally, Jukebox Sparrows (Capitol) R/M
- Victoria Williams, Musing of a Creek Dipper (Atlantic) R/M
- Brian Blade, Fellowship (Blue Note) R/M
- Luscious Jackson, Fever In Fever Out (Capitol) R/M
- Lisa Germano, Happiness (4AD) R
- Harold Budd, By the Dawns Early Light (Opal) R/M
- Crash Vegas, Red Earth (Sony) R
- The Wailin' Jennys, Bright Morning Stars (Red House Records) P/R/M
- Alexz Johnson, A Stranger Time P
- Mustangs of the West, Time (Blue Élan Records) P/R

== Award nominations and wins ==
- Juno Award Nomination-Producer of the Year - The Tragically Hip - Day for Night 1994 — Mark Howard - Producer, Engineer
- UK Americana Awards, International Album of The Year 2019 - Courtney Marie Andrews - May Your Kindness Remain - Mark Howard - Producer, Engineer

== Sources ==
- Producing Hit Records: Secrets from the Studio by David Farinella
- Uncut Magazine "Meet the Real Dylan" (Nov. 2008)
- Chronicles: Volume One - Bob Dylan - 2004 (Simon and Schuster)
