= Trixie Whitley =

Belgian musician (born 1987)

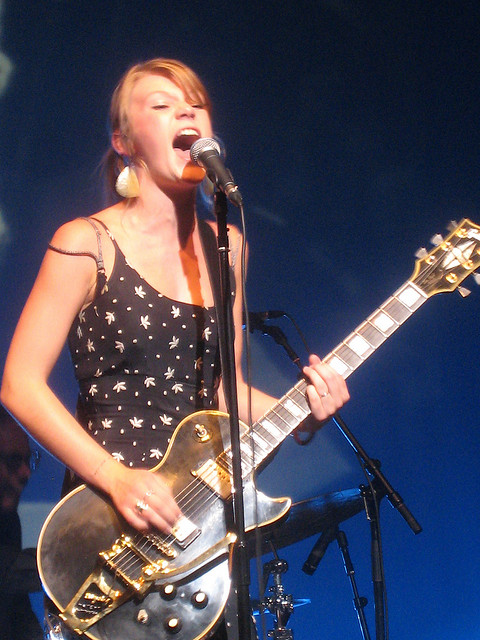
- Whitley in a performance in 2008

Background information
- Born: June 24, 1987 (age 39); Ghent, Belgium
- Genres: Alternative rock, soul, blues rock
- Occupations: Musician, songwriter
- Instruments: Vocals, drums, guitar, keyboards
- Label: Strong Blood Music (BMI)
- Member of: Black Dub
- Website: trixiewhitley.com

Trixie Whitley (born June 24, 1987) is a Belgian American multi-instrumentalist. As the daughter of singer-songwriter Chris Whitley, she began her musical career playing with her father, and recording on several of his albums. Whitley has released three solo EPs, is a member of Black Dub, and was the vocalist on their self-titled debut album.

== Early years ==
Born in Ghent, Belgium, Trixie Whitley moved to New York with her mother Hélène Gevaert when she was just a year old, where her father, musician Chris Whitley lived. Even as a toddler, she was immersed in music and the arts, spending time in some of the world's most renowned studios including Electric Lady Studios. Her early years were split between Ghent and New York City. Trixie began playing the drums when she was 10. When she was 11, she toured Europe with several theater companies, and at the age of 14 with the dance company, "Les Ballets C de la B," as an actor, singer, dancer, and musician. During this same period, Trixie also became known as the youngest resident DJ in Europe, embraced by Belgium's Museum of Modern Art and spinning at raves, festivals, and parties in Brussels, Paris, New York, and Amsterdam.

After her time with Les Ballets C de la B and other performing arts collectives in Europe, she quit school to move back to New York City at age 17. Working odd jobs in Brooklyn and Queens, she started to perform her own music in clubs throughout the city.

== Music ==
In 2005 following the death of her father, she continued to write and record her own material. She recorded her first EP, Strong Blood, in the spring of 2008, produced with Meshell Ndegeocello and Dougie Bowne. That summer, she was invited to present two shows at the Montreal International Jazz Festival. She continued to collaborate with musicians and producers like Marc Ribot, Robert Plant, Stephen Barber, Marianne Faithfull, Joe Henry, Craig Street, and Malcolm Burn among many others.

In late 2008, producer Daniel Lanois contacted Trixie and invited her to the Berklee College of Music, where he was in residence after being invited by Jeanne Ciampa to perform and teach at Berklee for a week. Culminating in a recording with students. Daniel was supposed to produce a song with Jeanne Ciampa but instead brought Trixie Whitley. Their collaboration on Trixie's song "I'd Rather Go Blind" – with drummer Brian Blade – was filmed and provoked a buzz in music circles. Soon, with the addition of bassist Daryl Johnson, a supergroup – Daniel Lanois' Black Dub – was born.

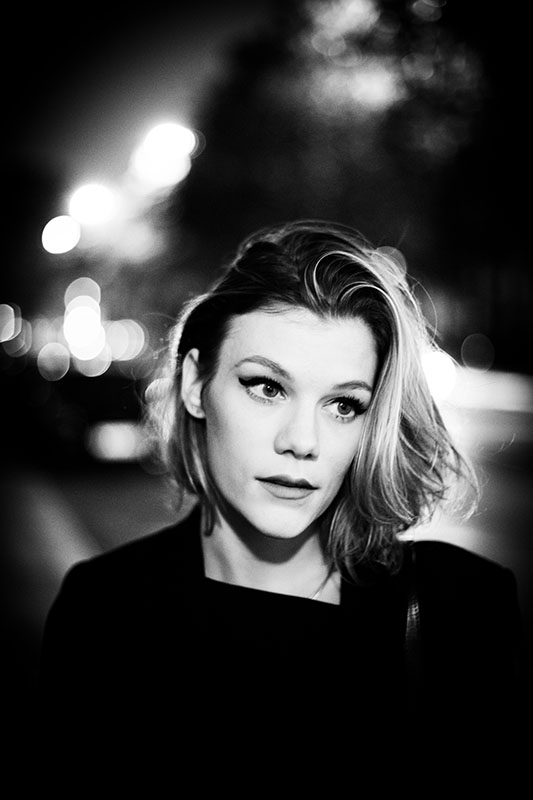
Public press photo of Whitley before her last album; 9 September 2015

In 2010 and 2011 she toured the world performing with Black Dub, which included Canadian musician and producer Daniel Lanois. During the Black Dub recording sessions, she also recorded her second EP, The Engine, featuring her own music and began preparing to record her debut as a leader. In late 2011, she released Live at the Rockwood Music Hall, a 5-song EP of her solo performance recorded at Rockwood in New York City.

In early 2012, she returned to the studio to finish her debut album, Fourth Corner, with producer Thomas Bartlett, engineer Pat Dillett, and string arrangements by Rob Moose. In anticipation of Fourth Corner, the summer of 2012 had Trixie taking the stage at festivals like Bonnaroo, SXSW, and Celebrate Brooklyn.

In November and December 2012, she embarked on her first solo tour of the US, and 2013 was filled with European and US tour dates. Her critically acclaimed debut album Fourth Corner was released in the US on January 29, 2013, in Europe on February 11, 2013, and in the UK on March 5, 2013.

Her third solo album, Lacuna, was announced on January 4, 2019 and released on March 29.

== Discography ==
As Trixie Whitley

- Strong Blood EP (2008)
- The Engine – EP (2009)
- Live at Rockwood Music Hall – EP (2011)
- Fourth Corner (2013)
- Like Ivy (2013)
- Porta Bohemica (2015)
- Sway (2016) – Includes outtakes and live tracks
- Lacuna (2019)
- Lacuna Re-Imagined (2020)
- The Dragon of Everything – EP (2024)

As Black Dub
With Daniel Lanois, Brian Blade and Daryl Johnson

- Black Dub (2010)

With Chris Whitley

- Terra Incognita (1997)
- Rocket House (2001)
- Pigs Will Fly (soundtrack) with Warner Poland and Kai-Uwe Kohlschmidt (2003)
- Soft Dangerous Shores (2005)

With Kid Koala

- Music to Draw To: Io – Featuring Trixie Whitley (2019)

== Awards ==
In early 2016, Porta Bohemica was nominated for IMPALA's European Independent Album of the Year.
