= Modernday Folklore =

Studio album by Ian Moore
- Released: June 27, 1995
- Genre: Rock, blues rock
- Length: 55:42
- Label: Capricorn
- Producer: Mark Howard, Ian Moore

Ian Moore chronology
Live from Austin (1994)	Modernday Folklore (1995)	Ian Moore's Got the Green Grass (1998)

Professional ratings
Review scores
Source	Rating
AllMusic	3/5 stars

Modernday Folklore is the second studio album by Ian Moore and was released in 1995. The album peaked at No. 14 on the Billboard Top Heatseekers chart.

== Track listing ==
All songs by Ian Moore, except where noted

1. "Muddy Jesus" - 4:52
2. "Society" - 4:11
3. "Today" - 5:05
4. "Daggers" - 2:01
5. "Bar Line 99" - 4:21
6. "Dandelion" - 3:52
7. "Lie" - 5:45
8. "Train Tracks" - 4:06
9. "Monday Afternoon" - 2:28
10. "You'll Be Gone" - 5:17 (Ian Moore, Bukka Allen)
11. "Stain" - 5:30
12. "Morning Song" - 6:04
13. "Home" - 2:10

== Personnel ==
- Ian Moore - Guitar, Vocals, Sitar, Percussion
- Chris White - Bass, Background Vocals, Percussion
- Bukka Allen - Piano, Organ, Percussion
- Michael Villegas - Drums, Percussion
- Sass Jordan - Vocals on "Stain" and "Lie"
- Flaco Jiménez - Accordion on "Muddy Jesus"
- Daryl Johnson - Vocals on "Stain" and "Lie"
- Tim Green - Saxophone
- Reggie Houston - Baritone Saxophone
- Renard Poché - Trombone
- Stacey Cole - Trumpet
- Irene Sazer - Violin
- Katrina Wreede - Viola
- Julian Smedley - Violin
- Dan Reiter - Cello
