= Black Dub =

Studio album by Black Dub
- Released: September 2010 [2LP] November 2010 [CD]
- Genre: Rock
- Label: Jive Records
- Producer: Daniel Lanois

Black Dub is the debut album by the Daniel Lanois-instigated collaboration Black Dub, an amalgam of dub, blues, soul and rock. Allmusic gave it three and a half stars out of five, praising singer Trixie Whitley's "deeply soulful contralto." All songs are written by Lanois, save for two, the group effort "Last Time." and the song "Ring the Alarm" written by Tenor Saw.

Black Dub consists of Daryl Johnson (bass), Trixie Whitley (vocals), Brian Blade (drums), and Daniel Lanois (piano, guitar).

== Track listing ==
All tracks are written by Daniel Lanois; except where indicated.

No.	Title	Writer(s)	Length
1.	"Love Lives"		3:39
2.	"I Believe in You"		4:27
3.	"Ring the Alarm" (contains a portion of the composition "Ring the Alarm")	Winston Riley, Clive Bright	6:29
4.	"Last Time"	Lanois, Daryl Johnson, Trixie Whitley, Brian Blade	3:00
5.	"Surely"		5:08
6.	"Nomad"		4:17
7.	"Slow Baby"		4:19
8.	"Silverado"		3:42
9.	"Canaan"		4:13
10.	"Sing"		3:24
11.	"Sirens"		2:31

Japanese edition bonus tracks
No.	Title	Length
12.	"Jimmy Dub"	3:05
13.	"Lovers Unloved"	2:59

== Personnel ==
Musicians

- Trixie Whitley – vocals
- Daniel Lanois – guitar, keyboards, vocals
- Daryl Johnson – bass, vocals
- Brian Blade – drums, vocals

with:

- Christopher Thomas – bass on "Surely"
- Aaron Embry – keyboards on "Surely"
- Brady Blade Sr. – vocals on "Last Time"
- Mark Howard – drum programming on "Lovers Unloved"

Production

- Daniel Lanois – producer, engineer (mixing)
- Margaret Marissen – production assistant
- Keisha Kalfin – production assistant in LA
- Michael Tedesco – A&R Executive
- Mark Howard – engineer (recording, mixing)
- Tony Mangurian – engineer (additional engineering, editing)
- Gary Burden & Jenice Heo – art direction
- Pieter-Jan de Smet – cover image provider
- Adam CK Vollick – cinematography, photography
- John Huffman – photography
