= Craig Street =

American record producer

Craig Street, born in Oakland, California, is a record producer.

Street moved with his family to Los Angeles at the age of 11, but returned to the Bay Area for his high school years. He began playing guitar at age 14, and was in a number of Berkeley bands. In 1981 he interviewed Alan Douglas for an NPR documentary about Jimi Hendrix, which Street co-produced with then KPFA-FM 3rd World Director Bari Scott, and San Jose radio broadcaster Don West. He moved to New York in the 1980s, where he began producing records, starting with Blue Light 'til Dawn by jazz vocalist Cassandra Wilson. Wilson had just signed with the Blue Note label. The album was Wilson's commercial breakthrough and Street went on to produce often successful records predominantly of musicians who understand their voice as principal instrument.

Street has produced albums in a variety of genres, including pop, jazz, soul, and country. In a 1998 interview, he told the Los Angeles Times, "I know it sounds corny, but I never learned how to separate music, to make distinctions between genres." His music production credits include Norah Jones, k.d. lang, Rebekka Bakken, Charlie Sexton, Meshell Ndegeocello, Joe Henry, John Legend, The Manhattan Transfer, Bettye LaVette, Chris Whitley, Geri Allen, Holly Cole, and others.

Come Away with Me, for which he produced some early tracks, won a Grammy for Album of the Year in 2002.

== Discography ==
Sortable table
Date	Artist	Album title	Label	Notes
1993	Cassandra Wilson	Blue Light 'til Dawn	Blue Note	
1995	Holly Cole	Temptation	Alert	
1995	Cassandra Wilson	New Moon Daughter	Blue Note	
1995	Javon Jackson	For One Who Knows	Blue Note	
1996	Jimmy Scott	Heaven	Warner	
1996	Javon Jackson	A Look Within	Blue Note	
1997	k.d. lang	Drag	Warner	
1997	Jeb Loy Nichols	Lovers Knot	Capitol	
1997	Jeremy Toback	Perfect Flux Thing	RCA	
1997	Chocolate Genius	Black Music	V2	
1997	Chris Whitley	Dirt Floor	Messenger	
1998	Geri Allen, Mark and Scott Batson as Triad	Three Pianos for Jimi	Douglas	Co-prod. by Alan Douglas
1998	Dougie Bowne	One Way Elevator	DIW	
1999	Javon Jackson	Pleasant Valley	Blue Note	
1999	Shelby Starner	From in the Shadows	Warner	
1999	Me'Shell NdegéOcello	Bitter	Maverick	
2000	Susana Baca	Eco de Sombras	Luaka Bop	
2000	The Manhattan Transfer	The Spirit of St. Louis	Atlantic	
2000	Chris Whitley Feat. Billy Martin and Chris Wood	Perfect Day	Valley Entertainment	
2000	Supergenerous (Cyro Baptista and Kevin Breit)	Supergenerous	Blue Note	
2001	David Linx	L'instant d'aprés	Polygram	
2001	Jubilant Sykes	Wait for Me	Sony Classical	
2001	Joe Henry	Scar	Mammoth	
2002	Dirty Dozen Brass Band	Medicated Magic	Ropeadope	
2002	The Derek Trucks Band	Joyful Noise	Columbia	
2002	Norah Jones	Come Away with Me	Blue Note	
2002	Susana Baca	Espíritu vivo	Luaka Bop	
2002	Molly Johnson	Another Day	Marquis	
2003	Boyd Tinsley	True Reflections	RCA	
2004	Gipsy Kings	Roots	Nonesuch	
2004	Dirty Dozen Brass Band	Funeral for a Friend	Ropeadope	
2005	Chocolate Genius, Inc.	Black Yankee Rock	Commotion	
2005	Lizz Wright	Dreaming Wide Awake	Verve Forecast	
2006	Susana Baca	Travesías	Luaka Bop	
2006	John Legend	Once Again	G.O.O.D. Music	
2008	Lizz Wright	The Orchard	Verve Forecast	
2009	Brandi Shearer	Love Don't Make You Juliet	Vinyl Tiger	
2009	Rebekka Bakken	Morning Hours	EmArcy	
2010	Madeleine Peyroux	Standing on the Rooftop	Decca	
2011	Alyssa Graham	The Lock, Stock, and Soul	Sunnyside	
2012	Bettye LaVette	Thankful n' Thoughtful	Anti-	
2012	Amy Cook	Summer Skin	Thirty Tigers	
