= Johnny Society =

American rock band

- Origin: New York City, United States
- Genres: Alternative rock Indie rock Americana; Neo-psychedelia
- Years active: 1996-present
- Label: Messenger
- Members: Kenny Siegal; Brian Geltner; Gwen Snyder

Johnny Society is an American rock band from New York City.

== Biography ==
Johnny Society was formed in 1996 by multi-instrumentalist Kenny Siegal and Brian Geltner. They released a self-titled album as Hunk on Geffen in 1996, but disbanded less than a year after their album came out, only for Siegal and Geltner to reunite shortly thereafter under their new identity.

Meanwhile, they had already begun experimenting and writing songs on the side with Indian-trained musician Chris Rael in a project they called The Hand, which released an album (Mule Me) before re-forming Johnny Society. Their debut album, It Don't Matter, was recorded and released in 1997, after which Rael left the band to give his full-time to the reconvened Church of Betty. Wood arrived the following year with additional contributions from Rael, The Hand live keyboardist Jan Kotik, Bryce Goggin, and labelmate Chris Whitley. The album was named to the "Top Ten List of Independent Records of 1998" by The New York Times at year's end. Johnny Society became a trio in 1999 when Gwen Snyder (who also records under the moniker Blueberry) joined in time to record the band's third album, Clairvoyance, released at the beginning of 2000. Clairvoyance was named "Album of the Year" at the 2002 Independent Music Awards by a panel of judges that included Tom Waits, Ricky Skaggs, Me'Shell NdegéOcello, Mitchell Froom, Don Byron, Wilson Pickett, Victoria Williams, and George Duke. Life Behind the 21st Century Wall (2003) and Coming to Get You (2005) followed.

== Discography ==
- Hunk (1996, Geffen)
- It Don't Matter (1997, Messenger)
- Wood (1998, Messenger)
- Clairvoyance (2000, Messenger)
- Life Behind the 21st Century Wall (2003, Messenger)
- Coming to Get You (2005, Messenger)
