= Dance to the Drums Again =

Studio album by Cassandra Wilson
- Released: 1992
- Recorded: January 1992
- Studio: Systems Two (Brooklyn, New York)
- Genre: Jazz
- Length: 51:36
- Label: Columbia
- Producer: Cassandra Wilson; Jean-Paul Bourelly

Cassandra Wilson chronology
After the Beginning Again (1991)	Dance to the Drums Again (1992)	Blue Light 'til Dawn (1993)

Professional ratings
Review scores
Source	Rating
AllMusic	1.5/5 stars
The Encyclopedia of Popular Music	3/5 stars
The Penguin Guide to Jazz on CD	2/4 stars
The Rolling Stone Jazz & Blues Album Guide	3/5 stars

Dance to the Drums Again is the seventh studio album by American jazz singer Cassandra Wilson, released in 1992 via Columbia label.

== Reception ==
In a review for AllMusic, Scott Yanow noted that with this album, Wilson was at the "crossroads of her career". A reviewer for New York wrote: "This disc benefits greatly from the strength of the material most of which was penned by Wilson and guitarist-co-producer Jean-Paul Bourelly".

== Track listing ==
All songs by Jean-Paul Bourelly and Cassandra Wilson unless otherwise noted.

1. "Melanin Song" – 5:33
2. "Don't Look Back" – 4:55
3. "Rhythm on My Mind" – 5:39
4. "Wonders of Your Love" (James Weidman, Wilson) – 4:11
5. "Nothin' But a Thang" – 5:57
6. "I Will Be There" – 5:54
7. "Just Keep Thinking of Eubay" – 6:02
8. "Another Rainy Day" (Wilson) – 3:57
9. "Amazing Grace" (John Newton) – 4:48
10. "Dance to the Drummer Again" (Wilson) – 5:15

== Personnel ==
- Cassandra Wilson – vocals, synthesizers (1), acoustic piano (9)
- Rod Williams – synthesizers (3, 5–7)
- James Weidman – acoustic piano (4, 8), synthesizers (8)
- Jean-Paul Bourelly – guitars (1–3, 5–7), guitar synthesizer (2, 3, 7)
- Kevin Bruce Harris – electric bass (1, 2, 4–6, 8)
- Kevin Johnson – drums (1, 2, 6)
- Mark Johnson – drums (4, 8)
- Bill McClellan – drums (10)
- Doc Rhythm Boss – percussion (1)
- Jeff Haynes – percussion (10)

=== Production ===
- Disk Union – executive producers
- Cassandra Wilson – executive producer, producer, mixing
- Jean-Paul Bourelly – producer, mixing
- Joe Marciano – recording engineer, mixing
- Sandy Summers Head – assistant producer
- Kazunori Sugiyama – project coordinator
- Abigayle Tarsches – cover photography
- DIW Design Room – cover design
