= Nervous Cabaret =

Nervous Cabaret is an American punk-cabaret band from Brooklyn, New York, which formed in 2002.

== History ==
The singer Elyas Khan's stage creation Fragmented Devotion To You, an operetta he conceived, wrote, and scored the surrounding music for, debuted at the 2001 DUMBO Arts Festival in Brooklyn, and was the final stage in the development of his band Nervous Cabaret.

The band has also performed with Amanda Palmer and Sxip Shirey at the Music Hall of Williamsburg in Brooklyn and Jil Is Lucky at La Cigale theatre in Paris, France Additionally, Nervous Cabaret performed on the same stage with Sonic Youth at Les Escales Festival in Saint-Nazaire, France.

Nervous Cabaret also supported Amanda Palmer on tour at the Bijou Theater in Knoxville, Tennessee.

In 2008, Nervous Cabaret was invited to perform at the Louvre museum in Paris.

== Band members ==
- Elyas Khan – vocals, guitar, bass, electronics
- Fred Wright – cornet, recorder
- Brian Geltner – drums, percussion, organ
- Greg Wieczorek – drums, percussion
- Don Undeen – baritone saxophone, clarine
- Sam Kulik – trombone

== Discography ==
- Nervous Cabaret – 2005 (France) Naïve Records (released in the United States in 2006); produced by Kenny Siegal; recorded at Old Soul Studios in Catskill, New York; mixed by Bryce Goggin at Trout Studios in Brooklyn, New York; mastered by Greg Calbi at Sterling Sound in New York City, New York
- Drop Drop – 2007 CD / Naïve Records (released in the United States in 2009); produced by Kenny Siegal, recorded at Old Soul Studios in Catskill, New York; mixed by Bryce Goggin at Trout Studios in Brooklyn, New York; mastered by Fred Kevorkian at Avatar Studios in New York City, New York
- Ecstatic Music for Savage Souls – 2003 EP/ ELab Recordings; produced and mastered by Danny Kadar
