= After the Beginning Again =

Studio album by Cassandra Wilson
- Released: 1992
- Recorded: July & August 1991
- Studio: Systems Two, Brooklyn, New York
- Genre: Jazz
- Length: 41:33
- Label: JMT JMT 514 001
- Producer: Cassandra Wilson

Cassandra Wilson chronology
She Who Weeps (1991)	After the Beginning Again (1992)	Dance to the Drums Again (1992)

After the Beginning Again is the sixth studio album by the American jazz singer Cassandra Wilson, released on the JMT label in 1992 and later rereleased on Winter & Winter.

== Reception ==
Professional ratings
Review scores
Source	Rating
AllMusic	3/5 stars
The Encyclopedia of Popular Music	3/5 stars
The Penguin Guide to Jazz on CD	3/4 stars
The Rolling Stone Jazz & Blues Album Guide	3/5 stars

AllMusic's Steve Leggett wrote, "When compared to her more mature mid-'90s Blue Note releases, After the Beginning Again sounds much busier, but a listener is left with the nagging feeling that this busyness is covering for the fact that nothing is really going anywhere in particular. Wilson in time would correct all this and grow wonderfully into her material, but on this outing her focus is not quite there yet." The Penguin Guide to Jazz on CD wrote that the album was "one of her strongest studio dates", praised "There She Goes" as a "haunting tune", and described the rendition of "Baubles, Bangles, & Beads" as "memorably downcast".

== Track listing ==
All compositions by Cassandra Wilson except as indicated

1. "There She Goes" - 4:08
2. "'Round Midnight" (Thelonious Monk, Cootie Williams, Bernie Hanighen) - 6:01
3. "Yazoo Moon" (James Weidman, Cassandra Wilson) - 4:27
4. "Sweet Black Night" (Kevin Bruce Harris) - 5:06
5. "My Corner of the Sky" - 5:38
6. "Baubles, Bangles, & Beads" (Alexander Borodin, George Forrest, Robert Wright) - 6:39
7. "Redbone" - 4:24
8. "Summer Wind" (Weidman, Wilson) - 5:34

== Personnel ==
- Cassandra Wilson – vocals
- James Weidman – piano, synthesizers
- Kevin Bruce Harris – electric bass guitar
- Mark Johnson – drums, percussion
- Jeff Haynes – percussion
