= Live from Austin (Ian Moore album) =

Live album by Ian Moore
- Released: 1994
- Recorded: June 21–22, 1994
- Venue: The Steamboat, Austin, Texas
- Genre: Rock, blues rock
- Length: 34:43
- Label: Capricorn
- Producer: Ian Moore, Justin Niebank

Ian Moore chronology
Ian Moore (1993)	Live from Austin (1994)	Modernday Folklore (1995)

Professional ratings
Review scores
Source	Rating
Allmusic	3/5 stars

Live from Austin is the first live recording by Ian Moore, released in 1994 (see 1994 in music).

== Track listing ==
All songs by Ian Moore, except where noted

1. "Pay No Mind" - 5:19
2. "Satisfied" - 5:17
3. "Deliver Me" (Ian Moore, Chris White) - 6:47
4. "Blue Sky/Abraham, Martin & John" (Ian Moore/Dick Holler) - 10:08
5. "Me and My Guitar" (Leon Russell, Charles Blackwell) - 7:12

== Personnel ==
- Ian Moore - guitars, vocals
- Bukka Allen - piano, organ
- Chris White - bass, background vocals
- Michael Villegas - drums, background vocals

with:

- Bradley Kopp - rhythm guitar
- Kris McKay, Toni Price - backing vocals
- Kathy Burdick - additional backing vocals
