= Ian Moore (album) =

Studio album by Ian Moore
- Released: June 15, 1993
- Studio: The Bennett House, Franklin, Tennessee
- Genre: Rock, blues rock
- Length: 56:29
- Label: Capricorn
- Producer: Barry Beckett, Justin Niebank

Ian Moore chronology
| Ian Moore (1993) | Live from Austin (1994) |

Professional ratings
Review scores
| Source | Rating |
|---|---|
| Allmusic | 4/5 stars |

Ian Moore is the debut album by Ian Moore and was released in 1993 (see 1993 in music).

== Track listing ==
All songs by Ian Moore, except where noted.

1. "Nothing" - 5:16
2. "Revelation" - 4:34
3. "Satisfied" - 4:15
4. "Blue Sky" - 5:56
5. "Not in Vain" - 5:16 (Ian Moore, Chris White, Michael Villegas)
6. "Harlem" - 4:57
7. "How Does it Feel" - 5:02
8. "Deliver Me" - 6:16 (Ian Moore, Chris White)
9. "How Long" - 4:27 (Ian Moore, Michael Dan Ehmig)
10. "Please God" - 4:47
11. "Carry On" - 5:43

== Personnel ==
- Ian Moore - vocals, guitars
- Chris White - bass
- Bukka Allen - piano, organ, clavinet
- Michael Villegas - drums

with:

- Barry Beckett - keyboards, organ
- Reese Wynans - B-3 organ on "Satisfied" and "Please God"
- Justin Niebank - percussion
- Donna McElroy, Justin Niebank, Kathy Burdick, Kelli Bruce, Kim Fleming, Yvonne Hodges - backing vocals
