= Jonathan Spottiswoode =

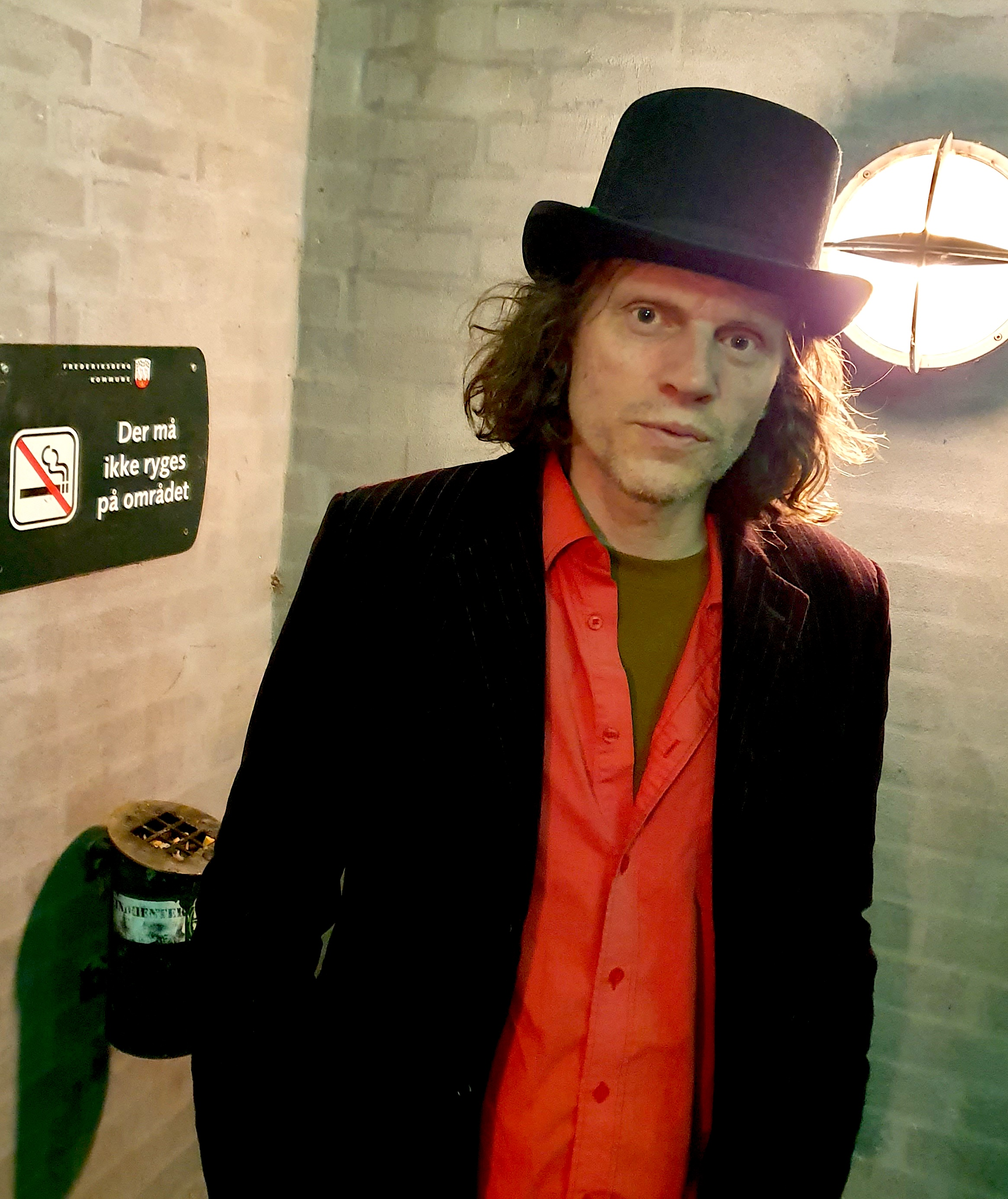
- Spottiswoode after a concert in Copenhagen

Background information
- Origin: London, United Kingdom
- Genres: Rock
- Instruments: singing, guitar, piano, harmonica
- Member of: Spottiswoode & His Enemies
- Website: www.spottiswoode.com

Jonathan Spottiswoode (born 1964) is the founder and frontman of the New York rock septet, Spottiswoode & His Enemies. He has performed and recorded his own music under the stage name "Spottiswoode" since 1997, the year he formed the band. He currently lives in London.

Spottiswoode has also worked as a writer and director. He co-wrote and co-directed The Gentleman, a short film which screened at the Slamdance and BBC Short Film Festivals and which played for several years on the Independent Film Channel. He later wrote Either Side Of Midnight, a film script which follows four separate yet interweaving stories over one Friday night in Manhattan. The film was ultimately produced and directed in 2019 by Roger Spottiswoode (no relation). The film was released in 2021.

He wrote the gothic rock musical Above Hell's Kitchen, which was loosely inspired by Don Giovanni. It was staged at the New York Musical Theatre Festival in 2010. In January 2026, theatre company Breaking Borders International presented a London-based version of the story as, Between The Angel And The Old Kent Road, as a staged reading at the Seven Dials Playhouse.

== Awards and recognition ==
His songs and albums have been nominated for several Independent Music Awards. Wild Goosechase Expedition, the fifth album by Spottiswoode & His Enemies, earned the IMA for "Best Eclectic Album".
