= Luminaria (album) =

Studio album by Ian Moore
- Released: August 24, 2004
- Recorded: 2003
- Genre: Rock, folk rock
- Length: 44:51
- Label: Yep Roc Records
- Producer: Ian Moore

Ian Moore chronology
Via Satellite (2001)	Luminaria (2004)	To Be Loved (2007)

Professional ratings
Review scores
Source	Rating
Allmusic	4.5/5 stars

Luminaria is the sixth studio album by Ian Moore and was released in 2004 (see 2004 in music).

== Track listing ==
All songs by Ian Moore, except where noted

1. "What I've Done" - 3:56
2. "Caroline" - 7:13
3. "New Day" - 3:24
4. "April" - 3:05 (Ian Moore, Bukka Allen, George Reiff)
5. "Kangaroo Lake" - 3:35
6. "Abilene" - 3:51
7. "Ordinary People" - 5:29 (Ian Moore, Spencer Gibb)
8. "Cinnamon" - 4:33
9. "Bastard" - 2:23
10. "Sir Robert Scott" - 2:51
11. "Susan" - 4:31

== Personnel ==
- Ian Moore
- Chris Searles
- J. J. Johnson
- Nina Singh
- George Reiff
- Rob Jersoe
- Bukka Allen
- Derek Morris
- Jay Clarke
- Brian Standefer
- Chris Dye
- Will Sexton
- Paul Brainard
- Matthew Southworth
- Chris Forshage
- Kullen Fuchs
