= Kuruki =

Kuruki is a minimal wave project spearheaded by Ghent-based musician Gerry D'Haeyer and Alain Bureau (Sally Joy).

The band was founded in the early 1980s. Its first release, the single "Crocodile Tears," was the band's single hit and appeared on a number of compilations. Afterwards several singles and 10 inches were released, though none matched the success of the first single. In 1981 the band released the aforementioned Crocodile tears and the 12 inch maxi single "Such A Liar". After intensive touring a new single “Just a cat” was released in 1983. In 1984, they released three records: Action, a 12-inch which was recorded with Chris Whitley; a single "Souvenir/Souvenir," and the LP TV Scape, their final release. As a live band at that time they were also joined by Alan Gevaert, from Deus, and again Chris Whitley, who were active at that time as A Noh Rodeo.

Gerry D'Haeyer later went on to play drums with bluesmusician Roland Van Campenhout, Roland and the bluesworkshop, Wim De Craene. He was also a member of Hubble Bubble where he was replaced by Plastic Bertrand while doing his army service. He is currently a drummer with Catfish, The Suspects, and Zulema.

In 2010, TV Scape was re-released by the small Belgian label Onderstroom, which re-issues classic Belgian new wave and minimal wave groups. The band is currently having renewed success especially in the America's, where they were picked up by minimal wave dj Veronica Vasicka. At the moment their label is creating a compilation of all their singles.

== Discography ==
- "Crocodile Tears/W.S. remake" (7", 1981)
- "Just A Cat/Marina key" (7", 1983)
- Such A Liar/Crocodile Tears (12", 1983)
- "Action I/Action II" (7", 1983)
- T.V. Scape (LP, 1984)
- "Souvenir" (7", 1984)
