= Andreina Pérez Aristeiguieta =

Venezuelan filmmaker, writer, and author

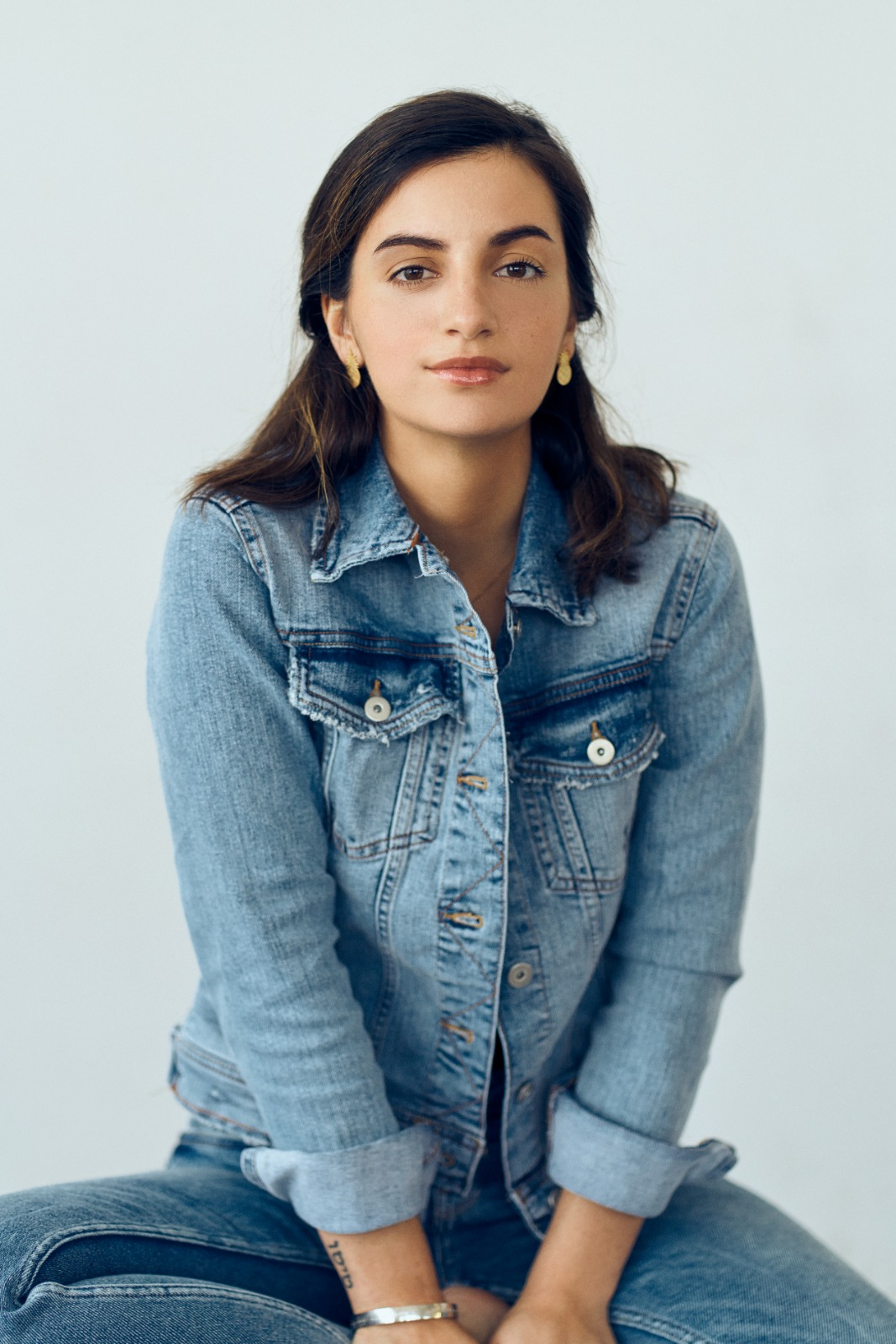
- Born: 1993 (age 32–33); Caracas, Venezuela
- Occupations: Filmmaker and screenplay writer
- Years active: 2013

Andreina Pérez (born as Andreina Eugenia Pérez Aristeiguieta) is a Venezuelan filmmaker, screenplay writer and author whose films and books have been screened and published throughout the United States and Latin America.

== Biography ==
Andreina Pérez was born and raised in Caracas, Venezuela, and graduated high school from the French Institute of Caracas. During this time, she participated in several poetry competitions and was part of the group of models of the United Nations representing the French Institute. After completing her Baccalaureate studies, she moved to Miami, Florida, USA.

In 2013, Andreina Pérez began her career as a theater actress, producer, writer and director at the Miami MicroTeatro, where she worked for two years to gain the opportunity to participate in several commercials. After this experience, she decided to move to Los Angeles, California, to start her career as a filmmaker.

In 2015, she managed to start her career in the film industry by participating as a production coordinator in the feature film A Week In London (Reality Queen), with actors such as Julia Faye West, Denise Richards and Mike Tyson. That same year, she was nominated for Best Comedy and Best Actress at the Laughlin International Film Festival in Las Vegas for her participation in the short film Second Floor, written and directed by her.

2016 was a year of great achievements for Andreina Pérez. Limbus, a short film in which she participated as a producer and casting associate, was nominated for Best Supernatural Film at the Miami International Science Fiction Film Festival. The same year, her short film Mia was awarded Best Thriller at the Los Angeles Independent Film Festival. In 2017, the short film Tito, Peace of Heaven, produced that same year and co-directed with Joel Seidl, was awarded the best drama short film at the Hollywood International Moving Picture Film Festival. At the same time, When Will I Love received an award for Best Experimental Short Drama Recorded with iPhone at the Los Angeles International Film Festival.

In 2018, Andreina Pérez decided to dedicate more time to her career as an author and public speaker. Together with Laura Chimaras, she published her first book, Contratiempo: Memories, Sequences, Time, with CreateSpace, an independent publishing platform.

The fast acceptance of the book prompted Andreina Pérez to carry out, together with Laura Chimaras, a promotional “Pasiones Narcóticas” tour, as a conference in various Latin American countries. The conference focused on topics such as literature and lateral thinking as a means of encouraging young people to chase their dreams.

At the end of the same year she published her first solo-book as an independent author, Fuck ... I Always End up Loving You, which was officially launched in Madrid, Spain in early 2019. The work, published independently, is a compilation of several writings that describe the different types of love that can be lived throughout life.

In 2019 Andreina Pérez published her first novel, Tito, Peace of Heaven, based on the short film of her own name. The work was independently edited and published, and it is a novel proposal in which the literary format and the screenplay format contain various graphic illustrations.

Alongside Alejandro Sequera, in mid-2019, she published the collection of poems Stargazer: Brevity Is Also Ethereal, which is part of a saga in which both authors work together. Their next book is to be titled Saturn and expected to be published in June 2021.

Andreina Pérez Aristeiguieta is currently working on the pre-production of her feature film Tito: Peace of Heaven, in which she reunited actors such as Emily Tosta and Alessandra Rosaldo. This film, developed in English, will be a joint production between Cinépolis and Emporio Films.

== Productions ==
=== Second Floor ===
Second Floor is the first short film directed and acted by Andreina in 2015. It features Olivia, a young businesswoman who is delayed to a work meeting and is trapped in the elevator with a handsome young man.

=== Tito: Peace of Heaven ===
Produced and released in 2016, Tito: Peace of Heaven is a story based on true events in honor of Alberto "Tito" Cohen (2006–2012). After suffering an accident that knocked her unconscious, Andreina was taken to the intensive care unit, where she met Tito through her dreams, who was in a coma after drowning in a pool.

After this experience, the connection between Tito and Andreina was maintained for several years through Andreina's dreams; after the death of Alberto Cohen, his mother created the Dejando Mi Huella Foundation, in which Andreina participates; she believes that her relationship with Tito gave her the strength to move on with her life.

The short film tells the story of a rebellious teenager whom, after a suicide attempt, meets Tito, a 3-year-old boy who is in a coma after a tragic accident in a swimming pool; both establish a relationship through dreams, which helps her to put her life back together under the inspiration of this little angel.

=== When Will I Love ===
Directed and written by Andreina Pérez, this short film was shot with an iPhone and tells the story of a young woman whose life takes a sharp turn as she begins to change her lifestyle and decides to write a letter every day to her ex-boyfriend as if it was her last day alive.

When Will I Love, shot and produced in 2017 as an experimental project recorded with an iPhone 7, had the participation of actress Laura Chimaras and was awarded for Best Experimental Short Drama Recorded with an iPhone at the Los Angeles International Film Festival.

=== A Week In London ===
In 2015, Andreina Pérez worked on this Hollywood feature film in which actors such as Julia Faye West, Denise Richards and Mike Tyson participated. Andreina Pérez worked as production coordinator on the film, which was directed and co-written by Steven Jay Bernheim and produced by London Film / Tanner Gordon Productions.

== Books ==
=== Contratiempo (Co-written with Laura Chimaras) ===
Contratiempo: Memories, Sequences, Time is a literary work written by Andreina Pérez and Laura Chimaras. The authors tell a time travel story between dimensions and alternative realities. They play with the illusion of time and space to capture this story and blur the borders between reality and fantasy. The same authors have confessed that they played with relativity.

=== Damn ... I always end up loving you ===
Her first solo-poetry book was published at the end of 2018 and released in Madrid in early 2019. Through each of her poems, Andreina tells us about love experiences she has lived throughout her life in a compilation of the writings of her adolescence that has been divided into the stages of her past relationships, including first love, sexual attachment, summer love and platonic love.

=== Tito, Peace of Heaven (Special Edition) ===
The English-language edition of Andreina Pérez's novel, based on her life experience and the self-titled short film produced and released in 2016, was published in 2019 by independently published platform CreateSpace.

=== Stargazer, Brevity Is Also Ethereal ===
A poetry book co-written between Andreina Pérez and Alejandro Sequera, author of Mi Viaje Sin Ti. Through their poems the authors talk about how life goes above and beyond just breathing and compare people to shooting stars, encouraging them to live their lives to the fullest. The poetry book was independently published in 2019.
