= Ian Moore (musician) =

American guitarist and singer-songwriter

Ian Moore (born August 8, 1968, in Berkeley, California, United States) is an American guitarist and singer-songwriter from Austin, Texas.

== Discography ==
=== Albums ===
- Ian Moore (Capricorn 1993)
- Modernday Folklore (Capricorn 1995)
- Ian Moore's Got the Green Grass (Habaldor 1998)
- And All the Colors... (Koch 2000)
- Luminaria (Yep Roc 2004)
- To Be Loved (Justice Records 2007)
- El Sonido Nuevo (Spark & Shine 2010)
- The First Third (Hablador 2011)
- Thirty Songs in Thirty Days (2013)
- Strange Days (2017)
- Toronto (2018)

=== EPs ===
- Aerie (Hablador 2013)
- The Noble Art (2016)
- Toronto (Last Chance 2018)

=== Live albums ===
- Live from Austin (Capricorn 1994)
- Via Satellite (Hablador 2001)

=== Videos ===
- Bootleg '96 (1996)
- Live from the Cactus Cafe (2003)

== See also ==
- Music of Austin
