= Perfect Day (Chris Whitley album) =

Studio album by Chris Whitley
- Released: July 25, 2000
- Recorded: March 28 & 29, 2000
- Genre: Rock
- Length: 38:59
- Label: Valley Entertainment
- Producer: Craig Street

Chris Whitley chronology
Live at Martyrs' (1999/2000)	Perfect Day (2000)	Rocket House (2001)

Professional ratings
Review scores
Source	Rating
Allmusic	3/5 stars

Perfect Day is the sixth album by singer-songwriter and guitarist, Chris Whitley. It is his fifth studio album.

It is a full-length release of "quiet jazzy" cover versions of "love songs". The album was recorded as a trio and is subtitled "Featuring Billy Martin and Chris Wood". Martin and Wood are the rhythm section of Medeski Martin & Wood.

It was produced by Craig Street. The album was recorded live to half-inch two-track recorder by Danny Kopelson at 33 1/3 Recording in Brooklyn, New York.

This recording was also released in the Super Audio CD (SACD) format.

== Track listing ==
1. "Spanish Harlem Incident" (Bob Dylan) – 2:38
2. "Smokestack Lightning" (Chester Burnett – Howlin' Wolf) – 4:41
3. "China Gate" (Victor Young, Harold Adamson) – 3:08
4. "Drifting" (Jimi Hendrix) – 2:34
5. "She's Alright" (McKinley Morganfield – Muddy Waters) – 3:55
6. "Perfect Day" (Lou Reed) – 3:31
7. "The Wild Ox Moan" (Vera Hall, Ruby Pickens Tartt) – 3:09
8. "The Crystal Ship" (John Densmore, Robby Krieger, Ray Manzarek, Jim Morrison – The Doors) – 3:18
9. "Spoonful" (Willie Dixon) – 5:04
10. "Stones in My Passway" (Robert Johnson) – 3:18
11. "4th Time Around" (Bob Dylan) – 3:46

== Personnel ==
- Chris Whitley – vocals and guitar
- Chris Wood – acoustic bass and strange overtones
- Billy Martin – drums, various percussion and more mud
