= The Wiyos =

The Wiyos are an American ragtime and blues band from the Brooklyn area of New York City. They are named after The Whyos, a street gang in New York City in the late 1800s. In their early days in they busked across the United States spending time in New Orleans. In 2009 they had their big break when they were invited to tour with Bob Dylan.
