= Spottiswoode & His Enemies =

- Origin: New York City
- Genres: Rock; Jazz; Alternative rock
- Years active: 1998 - Present
- Label: New Warsaw Records
- Website: Official Website

Spottiswoode & His Enemies are a New York based rock septet. Fronted by Jonathan Spottiswoode, who also writes most of the band's music, the group draws on eclectic influences with songs ranging from rock to folk to jazz and even gospel. Several of the band's members first played together in two Washington DC-based bands: The Oxymorons and the 1990s lounge punk group, the zimmermans.

Formed in 1997, the band has released seven albums and has won three Independent Music Awards and been nominated for several more. They have hosted numerous Manhattan residencies and have toured extensively. They were also the house band for the Bob Dylan tribute at Avery Fisher Hall

In an NPR interview, Jonathan Spottiswoode made this comment on the paradox of being a member of a well loved band but still having to struggle financially in the harsh environment of the modern music industry: "Maybe there was an illusion that was created in the '50s and '60s and '70s where there were all these huge bands making tons of money and there still are a few. But I think maybe the old-fashioned way, where you just — you're an itinerant musician and you depended on the kindness of strangers is — maybe that's the path again these days as things kind of implode."

== Critical reception ==
Paste Magazine's Steve LaBate wrote of the band's performance in Atlanta: "The longhaired, mutton-chopped British songwriter—who inhabits a possessed stage presence somewhere between Joe Cocker and Jim Morrison—knocked the crowd over with his gravelly voice, passionate delivery, dry wit and dark sense of humor[...]Toward the end of a set that inspired visions of Kevin Ayers and Randy Newman, the Enemies really showed their skills, with trumpet player Kevin Cordt and saxophonist Candace de Bartolo echoing the interplay of Miles Davis and Cannonball Adderley on landmark jazz album Kind of Blue. It was nothing short of transportive."

The New Yorker has said "Jonathan Spottiswoode, the backbone of this tight group, has a deep, rough-hewn voice that’s evocative of Leonard Cohen’s. He writes astringent ballads and groovy pop songs with equal aplomb."

== Line-up ==
- Jonathan Spottiswoode - vocals, guitar
- John Young - bass
- Tim Vaill - drums
- Candace DeBartolo - saxophone, clarinet, flute, vocals
- Kevin Cordt - trumpet, violin, vocals
- Riley McMahon - guitars, mandolin, lap steel guitar, banjo, glockenspiel, percussion
- Tony Lauria - piano, organ, accordion

In addition to the seven regular performers, the band is often accompanied on stage by several backup singers, bringing the total line-up to 10 or 11 musicians in total. Several of the members participate in other projects, as well. Spottiswoode & McMahon perform together in a duo, McMahon is a music producer and performs with other New York bands such as The Sad Little Stars, DeBartolo has a jazz band called Seeker, and Young plays with The Grandsons.

== Discography ==
1. Spottiswoode & His Enemies (2000)
2. Building A Road (2002)
3. That's What I Like (2007)
4. Salvation (2008)
5. Wild Goosechase Expedition (2011)
6. English Dream (2014)
7. Lost In The City (2018)

== Awards ==
- Independent Music Awards 2012: "Chariot" - Best Adult Contemporary Song
