= Dirt Floor =

Studio album by Chris Whitley
- Released: March 17, 1998
- Recorded: December 4, 1997
- Genre: Blues
- Length: 27:06
- Label: Messenger Records
- Producer: Craig Street

Chris Whitley chronology
| Terra Incognita (1997) | Dirt Floor (1998) | Live at Martyrs' (2000) |

Dirt Floor is the fourth studio album by singer-songwriter and guitarist, Chris Whitley.

It was produced by Craig Street and recorded over 2 days live direct to a two-track analog recorder using a single stereo ribbon microphone by Danny Kadar at Blue Moon Racing Shop (Whitley's father's barn) in Bellows Falls, Vermont. It was released by tiny indie Messenger Records in 1998.

This recording was also released by Classic Records in two audiophile formats. It was released in digital audio disk (DAD) 24-bit/96 kHz digital audio format playable with DVD hardware. Classic Records also released it in 180 gram vinyl audio format.

== Track listing ==
All tracks written by Chris Whitley.

1. "Scrapyard Lullaby" – 3:42
2. "Indian Summer" – 3:39
3. "Accordingly" – 3:27
4. "Wild Country" – 3:08
5. "Ball Peen Hammer" – 2:38
6. "From One Island to Another" – 2:17
7. "Altitude" – 2:52
8. "Dirt Floor" – 2:10
9. "Loco Girl" – 3:08

The import version of this album contains the following bonus tracks. All tracks written by Chris Whitley unless otherwise noted:

1. "The Model" (Karl Bartos, Ralf Hütter, Emil Schult – Kraftwerk) – 2:58
2. "Alien (live)" – 4:45
3. "Living with the Law (live)" – 3:57

== Critical praise ==
Professional ratings
Review scores
| Source | Rating |
|---|---|
| Allmusic | 3.5/5 stars |

The record is "...a beautiful album of one-microphone simplicity." – The New York Times The album showcased "the essence of his undiluted talent" and is "perhaps his most deeply affecting record".

== Trivia ==
- Dirt Floor was one of Bruce Springsteen's favorite albums of 1998.

== Cover versions ==
- Joe Bonamassa covered "Ball Peen Hammer" on Sloe Gin (2007).
- Gavin DeGraw covered "Indian Summer" on Free (2009).
- Wino and Conny Ochs covered "Dirt Floor" on Labour of Love (2012) and Freedom conspiracy (2015).
- Luke Watt covered "Ballpeen Hammer" on Hill End Ruin (2012)
- The Branford Marsalis Quartet, featuring Kurt Elling, covered "From One Island to Another" on Upward Spiral (2016)

== Personnel ==
- Chris Whitley – vocals, guitar, banjo, and foot stomp
