= Silver Lake (album) =

Studio album by Vic Chesnutt
- Released: 2003
- Label: New West
- Producer: Mark Howard

Vic Chesnutt chronology
Left to His Own Devices (2001)	Silver Lake (2003)	Ghetto Bells (2005)

Silver Lake is an album by the American musician Vic Chesnutt, released in 2003. Chesnutt supported the album with a North American tour that included shows with M. Ward.

== Production ==
Recorded over two weeks in Silver Lake, Los Angeles, the album was produced by Mark Howard. It was a more musically expansive album; Chesnutt, perhaps ironically, had initially intended to make "a big giant record, a ponderous, overproduced monstrosity." Chesnutt did not know his backing band before entering the studio. He claimed that the album contains references and secret messages to Victoria Williams.

"In My Way, Yes" expresses gratitude for Chesnutt's achievements. "Styrofoam" is about the interior life of a Styrofoam cooler. "Sultan, So Mighty" is about a harem eunuch. "Second Floor" is based on a Chinese poem from the fifth century. "I'm Through" describes a breakup.

== Critical reception ==
Professional ratings
Review scores
Source	Rating
Detroit Free Press	3/4 stars
The Encyclopedia of Popular Music	4/5 stars
Knoxville News Sentinel	A

The Knoxville News Sentinel wrote that "the sometimes lush production adds drama the Chesnutt's sweet, quirky vocals." The Arizona Republic deemed "Band Camp" "entertaining, uplifting, with an underlying hint of sadness and despair." The Boston Globe called the album "adventurous and compelling music" and "the most diverse and deeply textured work of his career." The New York Times noted that "Chesnutt has the scratchy voice of a young codger, an ear for modestly inspirational tunes and an eye for the homely, off-kilter detail."

The Washington Post opined that "Chesnutt's straight talk can be merely bratty and stereotypical, and his songs tend to meander aimlessly." The New Yorker labeled Silver Lake "one of his rootsiest—it sounds like a pine forest at dusk—and strongest efforts"; the magazine named it one of the best albums of 2003. The Globe and Mail considered "In My Way, Yes" "possibly his loveliest to date, where intensity and uncertainty join hands."

== Track listing ==
All tracks are written by Vic Chesnutt.

No.	Title	Length
1.	"I'm Through"	6:42
2.	"Stay Inside"	4:46
3.	"Band Camp"	4:34
4.	"Girl's Say"	3:24
5.	"2nd Floor"	6:15
6.	"Styrofoam"	4:56
7.	"Zippy Morocco"	4:05
8.	"Sultan, So Mighty"	8:18
9.	"Wren's Nest"	5:16
10.	"Fa-la-La"	5:21
11.	"In My Way, Yes"	5:17
