= Dislocation Blues =

Studio album by Chris Whitley and Jeff Lang
- Released: August 2006
- Recorded: April 2005
- Genre: Pop rock, country, blues
- Length: 62:52
- Label: Australian Broadcasting Corporation
- Producer: Jeff Lang

Jeff Lang albums chronology
You Have to Dig Deep to Bury Daddy (2005)	Dislocation Blues (2006)	Prepare Me Well: A Jeff Lang Anthology 1994–2006 (2006)

Professional ratings
Review scores
Source	Rating
All About Jazz	4.5/5 stars
AllMusic	4/5 stars
PopMatters	8/10
Stylus Magazine	A−

Dislocation Blues is a collaborative studio album, credited to American singer-songwriter and guitarist, Chris Whitley and Australian musician, Jeff Lang. The album was recorded in studios between Adelaide and Melbourne in April 2005, seven months before Chris Whitley's death from lung cancer.

The album was released in Australia in August 2006 and peaked at number 64 on the ARIA Charts, becoming the highest-charting album in Australia for both artists.

At the ARIA Music Awards of 2007, the album was nominated for Best Blues and Roots Album.

== Reception ==
Thom Jurek from AllMusic said "This collection of traditional blues tunes such as 'Stagger Lee' covers of Bob Dylan's 'When I Paint My Masterpiece' and 'Changing of the Guard' and originals from the catalogs of both men is an intimate, loose, deeply intuitive, and complementary set".

== Track listing ==
1. "Stagger Lee" (Traditional; arranged by Jeff Lang and Chris Whitley) – 7:26
2. "Twelve Thousand Miles" (Jeff Lang) – 4:36
3. "When I Paint My Masterpiece" (Bob Dylan) – 5:00
4. "Rocket House" (Chris Whitley) – 5:09
5. "The Road Leads Down" (Jeff Lang) – 2:52
6. "Dislocation Blues" (Chris Whitley) – 5:27
7. "Forever in My Life" (Prince Rogers Nelson – Prince) – 3:55
8. "Velocity Girl" (Chris Whitley) – 4:52
9. "Ravenswood" (Jeff Lang) – 5:23
10. "Underground" (Jeff Lang, Chris Whitley, Grant Cummerford, Ashley Davies) – 4:19
11. "Changing of the Guards" (Bob Dylan) – 6:42
12. "Motion Bride" (Chris Whitley, Jeff Lang) – 1:26
13. "Hellhound on My Trail" (live) (Robert Johnson) (hidden track) – 5:49
14. "Kick the Stones" (live) (Chris Whitley) (hidden track) – 4:59

== Personnel ==
- Chris Whitley – vocals, guitars
- Jeff Lang – vocals, guitars, chumbush, banjo
- Grant Cummerford – bass
- Ash Davies – drums

== Charts ==
Chart performance for Dislocation Blues
Chart (2006)	Peak position
Australian Albums (ARIA)	64
