= Big Sky Country (song) =

Single by Chris Whitley

from the album Living with the Law
- A-side: "Big Sky Country"
- B-side: "Phone Call from Leavenworth" "Kick the Stones"
- Released: 1991 (US); 1992 (EU)
- Recorded: Kingsway Studio, New Orleans, LA, USA
- Genre: Rock
- Length: 4:21 (single edit); 4:45 (album)
- Label: Columbia
- Songwriter: Chris Whitley
- Producer: Malcolm Burn

Chris Whitley singles chronology
"Living with the Law"	"Big Sky Country"	"Poison Girl"

"Big Sky Country" is a song recorded by American singer-songwriter and guitarist, Chris Whitley. It was the second single to be released from his 1991 debut album, Living with the Law, and became a hit single in the United States, rising to No. 35 on the Billboard Mainstream Rock chart in 1991.

== Music video ==
The music video features Whitley singing and playing his 1931 National Triolian in a variety of indoor and outdoor (Spanish mission / cemetery, midway, and American desert) environments. Parts of the video were filmed in stop motion animation. Bassist Alan Gevaert and a drummer appear in some scenes.

== Cover versions ==
John Mayer has covered the song live.

== Personnel ==
- Chris Whitley – National acoustic guitar, guitar, vocal, bass, and synth guitar
- Bill Dillon – guitar, pedal steel, and guitorgan
- Ronald Jones – drums
- Produced by Malcolm Burn
- Recorded by Mark Howard
- Mixed by Malcolm Burn and Mark Howard

== Charts ==
Chart performance for "Big Sky Country"
Chart (1991–1992)	Peak position
Australia (ARIA)	125
US Billboard (Mainstream Rock Tracks)	35
