= Rocket House =

Studio album by Chris Whitley
- Released: June 5, 2001
- Recorded: 2001
- Genre: Rock
- Length: 53:17
- Label: ATO Records
- Producer: Tony Mangurian

Chris Whitley chronology
Perfect Day (2000)	Rocket House (2001)	Long Way Around (2002)

Professional ratings
Review scores
Source	Rating
Allmusic	3.5/5 stars

Rocket House is the seventh album by singer-songwriter and guitarist Chris Whitley. It is his sixth studio album.

It was produced by Tony Mangurian and recorded primarily at Soho Music Studios in New York City. It was mixed by Tony Mangurian and Danny Madorsky at Greene St. Recording.

Additional recording was done at Little Henri Studio in New York City, Dok Noord in Ghent, Belgium, and by Scott Campbell in Los Angeles, California.

Whitley used turntable scratchings and what he called "electronic abstraction".

== Track listing ==
All tracks written by Chris Whitley unless otherwise noted.

1. "To Joy (Revolution of the Innocents)" (Chris Whitley, Tony Mangurian) – 4:26
2. "Radar" (Chris Whitley, Tony Mangurian) – 4:04
3. "Chain" – 5:38
4. "Say Goodbye" (Chris Whitley, Tony Mangurian) – 3:37
5. "Solid Iron Heart" – 3:51
6. "Rocket House" – 6:09
7. "Serve You" – 4:10
8. "Little Torch" – 4:45
9. "From a Photograph" – 3:55
10. "Vertical Desert" – 3:32
11. "Something Shines"
12. "Shadowland" (hidden track) – 9:05

== Personnel ==
- Chris Whitley – vocals, guitar, synth guitar, banjo, and synth bass
- Tony Mangurian – drums, processing and programming, bass, and guitar
- Stephen Barber – keyboards, piano, synth bass, percussion, jaw harp, programming, and arrangement (10)
- DJ Logic – turntables and electronic abstraction

=== Additional personnel ===
- Dave Matthews – acoustic guitar, electric guitar, and vocals (2)
- Bruce Hornsby – Wurlitzer outro (2)
- Darren Vigil Grey – percussion (1)
- Jill Momaday – percussion (1)
- Badal Roy – tabla (8)
- Mark Henry – programming (7)
- Blondie Chaplin – vocals and vamps (1, 5, 6, 8, 11)
- Trixie Whitley – vocals (3, 7)
- Chick Graning – vocals (6)

== Track listing – import bonus CD ==
For a limited time in France, Fargo Records packaged Rocket House with a bonus CD containing radio edits, live, unreleased, outtake, and acoustic material. This package is commonly called Rocket House – Edition limitée 2cd.

All tracks written by Chris Whitley unless otherwise noted:

1. "To Joy (Revolution of the Innocents) (edit)" (Chris Whitley and Tony Mangurian) – 3:41
2. "Radar (edit)" (Chris Whitley and Tony Mangurian) – 3:51
3. "Radar (live)" (Chris Whitley and Tony Mangurian) – 3:45
4. "Timebomb Baby" – 5:19
5. "Say Goodbye (acoustic)" (Chris Whitley and Tony Mangurian) – 3:31
6. "Vertical Desert (acoustic)" – 3:55
7. "Invisible Day" – 3:53
8. "Breaking Your Fall" – 3:11
9. "Shadowland (acoustic)" – 5:01
10. "Rocket House (acoustic)" – 4:41

=== Personnel ===
- Chris Whitley – vocals, guitar, synth guitar, banjo, and synth bass
- Tony Mangurian – drums, processing and programming, bass, guitar, producer (1, 2, 4), and mixer (4)
- Stephen Barber – keyboards, piano, synth bass, percussion, jaw harp, and programming
- DJ Logic – turntables and electronic abstraction

=== Additional personnel ===
- Dave Matthews – acoustic guitar, electric guitar, and vocals (2)
- Heiko Schramm – bass (3)
- Etienne Lytel – keyboards (3)
- Darren Vigil Grey – percussion (1)
- Jill Momaday – percussion (1)
- Blondie Chaplin – vocals and vamps (1)
- Michael Barbiero – mixing (1, 2)
- John Alagía – recording and mixing (3)
