= Din of Ecstasy =

Studio album by Chris Whitley
- Released: 1995
- Genre: Rock
- Length: 47:31
- Label: Work; Columbia
- Producer: John Custer, Chris Whitley, and Dougie Bowne

Chris Whitley chronology
Living with the Law (1991)	Din of Ecstasy (1995)	Terra Incognita (1997)

Professional ratings
Review scores
Source	Rating
AllMusic	2/5 stars
Christgau's Consumer Guide	(dud)
Entertainment Weekly	A−
Los Angeles Times	3/4 stars
Spin	8/10
The Virgin Encyclopedia of Nineties Music	4/5 stars

Din of Ecstasy is the second studio album by singer-songwriter and guitarist Chris Whitley. It was released on Columbia Records in 1995.

It was produced primarily by John Custer and Chris Whitley. The album was recorded by Steve Melton (assisted by Danny Kadar and Kent Bruce) and mixed by Toby Wright at Muscle Shoals Sound in Sheffield, Alabama, as well as Baby Monster, Sony Music Studios, and Electric Lady Studios in New York City.

In 2014 Danny Kadar published an alternative version of the album on SoundCloud without the additional effects in the official version.

The album followed 4 years after his first album in a marked departure of style with "Hendrixian feedback" and "loud, grungy alternative rock".

== Track listing ==
All tracks written by Chris Whitley unless otherwise noted.

1. "Narcotic Prayer" – 3:45
2. "Never" – 2:48
3. "Know" – 3:47
4. "O God My Heart Is Ready" – 3:13
5. "Can't Get Off" – 4:03
6. "God Thing" – 4:49
7. "Din" – 3:15
8. "New Machine" – 3:18
9. "Some Candy Talking" (Jim Reid and William Reid – The Jesus and Mary Chain) – 4:13
10. "Guns & Dolls" – 3:30
11. "WPL" – 3:09
12. "Ultraglide"
13. "Days of Obligation" (hidden track) – 7:41

"O God My Heart Is Ready" and "Din" were released as singles.

== Personnel ==
- Chris Whitley – vocals and guitars
- Dougie Bowne – drums, percussion, and co-production (9)
- Alan Gevaert – bass, bass pedals, and low end noise

Additional personnel

- Andy Rosen – Mellotron (1)
- Dan Whitley – lead guitar (4)
- Louis Lepore – lead guitar (13)
