= Pigs Will Fly (soundtrack) =

Soundtrack album by Warner Poland and Kai-Uwe Kohlschmidt featuring Chris Whitley
- Released: February 24, 2003
- Recorded: 2002
- Genre: Rock
- Length: 56:28
- Label: ulfTone
- Producer: Warner Poland and Kai-Uwe Kohlschmidt

(Music from and inspired by the film) Pigs Will Fly is the soundtrack for the German film, Pigs Will Fly (2002) directed by Eoin Moore. The soundtrack is a collaboration between musicians Warner Poland and Kai-Uwe Kohlschmidt and features singer-songwriter and guitarist, Chris Whitley.

The soundtrack was produced, recorded, and, mixed by Warner Poland and Kai-Uwe Kohlschmidt. It was recorded at Monobeat Studio in Berlin, Germany.

Additional recording was done at The Himalaya Lounge in Berlin, Germany.

== Track listing ==
All tracks written and performed by Warner Poland, Kai-Uwe Kohlschmidt and Chris Whitley unless otherwise noted.

1. "Crystaline" – 3:56
2. "Laxe 01" – 0:31
3. "Dislocation Blues" – 2:30
4. "Please Please" – 0:38
5. "Breaking Your Fall" – 3:30
6. "Gum" – 1:13
7. "Frisco 01" – 1:27
8. "Fine Day" – 3:53
9. "Tijuana" – 0:41
10. "Laxe 02" – 1:01
11. "Velocity" – 0:53
12. "Velocity Girl" – 4:27
13. "Under the Bridge" – 1:27
14. "Frisco 03" – 1:26
15. "Summer's Gone" (Warner Poland, Marcellus Puhlemann, Michael O'Ryan) – 3:29
16. "Laxe 06" – 0:53
17. "Laxe on the Run" – 1:07
18. "Crystaline (reprise)" – 1:55
19. "Fleamarket" – 1:32
20. "Piñata Baseball Bat" – 2:45
21. "Laxe 05" – 1:31
22. "Bridge Song" – 4:56
23. "Laxe 03" – 1:37
24. "Fine Day" (Film version) – 2:11
25. "Frisco 02" – 1:25
26. "Crystaline" (Film version) – 2:19
27. "Ballad of the 'Musical' Truckers" (unlisted track) – 3:52

== Personnel ==
- Chris Whitley – vocals and Reso-Phonic guitar (1, 2, 5, 7, 8, 12, 18, 22, 24, 26); Reso-Phonic guitar (06, 11, 17)
- Warner Poland – programming, guitars, bass, percussion, noises and sounds
- Kai-Uwe Kohlschmidt – programming, guitars, bass, percussion, noises and sounds
- Marcellus Puhlemann – drums
- Wolfgang Glum – drums
- Jan Hofmann – violin and viola
- Maria Magdelena Wilsmaier – cello
- Lutz Janus – double bassoon

== Additional personnel ==
- Trixie Whitley – backing vocals (12)
- Heiko Schramm – bass (8, 12)
- Matthias Macht – drums (8, 12)
- Michael O'Ryan – bass (15)
