= Living with the Law (song) =

Single by Chris Whitley

from the album Living with the Law
- A-side: "Living with the Law"
- B-side: "Phone Call from Leavenworth" "Kick the Stones" "Living with the Law (live)" "Kick the Stones (acoustic)"
- Released: 1991 (US); 1992 (EU)
- Recorded: Kingsway Studio, New Orleans, LA, USA
- Genre: Rock
- Length: 3:40
- Label: Columbia in UK; Sony in NL
- Songwriter: Chris Whitley
- Producer: Malcolm Burn

Chris Whitley singles chronology
"Living with the Law"	""Big Sky Country""

"Living with the Law" is a song recorded by American singer-songwriter and guitarist, Chris Whitley. It was the first single to be released from his 1991 début album, Living with the Law, and became a hit single in the United States, rising to No. 28 on the Billboard Mainstream Rock chart in 1991.

== Music video ==
The music video (directed by Rocky Schenck) features Whitley singing and playing his 1931 National Triolian in a variety of indoor and outdoor urban environments.

== Cover versions ==
Michael Shrieve covered the song on his album, Fascination (2001). The song has also been recorded by Robert Caruso.
