= Living with the Law (album) =

Studio album by Chris Whitley
- Released: 1991
- Recorded: 1990
- Studio: Kingsway
- Genre: Rock
- Length: 47:02
- Label: Columbia
- Producer: Malcolm Burn

Chris Whitley chronology
Living with the Law (1991)	Din of Ecstasy (1995)

Living with the Law is the debut album by singer-songwriter and guitarist Chris Whitley, released in 1991. "Living with the Law", "Big Sky Country", and "Poison Girl" were released as singles.

Malcolm Burn produced, mixed, and played on the album. It was recorded by Burn and Mark Howard at Kingsway Studio (Daniel Lanois's home) in New Orleans.

== Critical reception ==
Professional ratings
Review scores
Source	Rating
AllMusic	4.5/5 stars
Robert Christgau	(neither)
Entertainment Weekly	B+
The Rolling Stone Album Guide	3/5 stars

The Boston Globe opined that Whitley's "unusual bent-note singing and spare but deeply affecting lyrics mark him as a true discovery." The New York Times wrote that the album "is about dust, danger, two-lane roads and barren landscapes; it's about running and feeling like an outlaw, not so much in the literal as in the emotional sense of being detached and therefore free, of being at home on the outskirts of right and wrong." Living with the Law was named ninth best album of 1991 in the Pazz & Jop critics poll. It is listed in Tom Moon's 2008 book, 1,000 Recordings to Hear Before You Die.

Whitley later dismissed his first album as "too polished".

== Track listing ==
All tracks written by Chris Whitley.

1. "Excerpt" – 0:17
2. "Living with the Law" – 3:42
3. "Big Sky Country" – 4:45
4. "Kick the Stones" – 4:12
5. "Make the Dirt Stick" – 3:33
6. "Poison Girl" – 3:27
7. "Dust Radio" – 5:08
8. "Phone Call from Leavenworth" – 4:47
9. "I Forget You Every Day" – 4:33
10. "Long Way Around" – 4:27
11. "Look What Love Has Done" – 3:23
12. "Bordertown" – 4:30
13. "[unnamed]" – 0:18

== Personnel ==
- Chris Whitley – vocals, National guitar, acoustic guitar, electric guitar, bass guitar
- Ronald Jones – drums
- Daryl Johnson – bass guitar
- Bill Dillon – guitar, pedal steel
- Malcolm Burn – keyboards, tambourine

Additional personnel

- Peter Conway – harmonica (4)
- Alan Gevaert – bass (5)
- Daniel Lanois – guitar (6)
- Deni Bonet – viola on (6)
- Dan Whitley – guitar on (10)

== Charts ==
Chart performance for Living with the Law
Chart (1991)	Peak position
Australian Albums (ARIA)	109
