= Terra Incognita (Chris Whitley album) =

Studio album by Chris Whitley
- Released: February 18, 1997
- Recorded: March – April 1996
- Genre: Rock
- Length: 42:01
- Label: Work
- Producers: Chris Whitley, Toby Wright, Dougie Bowne

Chris Whitley chronology
Din of Ecstasy (1995)	Terra Incognita (1997)	Dirt Floor (1998)

Terra Incognita is the third studio album by singer-songwriter and guitarist, Chris Whitley, released in 1997.

It was produced primarily by Chris Whitley, Toby Wright, and Dougie Bowne. The album was recorded primarily by Mark Howard (assisted by Wayne Lorenz) at Boulevard Teatro in Oxnard, California. It was mixed primarily by Toby Wright (assisted by John Seymour) at Electric Lady Studios in New York City.

Additional recording was done by Dinky Dawson at the Best Western Highway Inn in Salem, Oregon ("As Flat as the Earth (exp)"), by Chris Whitley at the Sheffield Holiday Inn in Sheffield, Alabama ("Immortal Blues"), and by Toby Wright at Electric Lady Studios in New York City ("Alien").

Additional production and mixing on "Automatic" was done by Michael Barbiero.

The album's title was inspired by Dime-Store Alchemy: The Art of Joseph Cornell by Charles Simic.

== Critical reception ==
Professional ratings
Review scores
Source	Rating
AllMusic	3/5 stars
The Encyclopedia of Popular Music	2/5 stars
MusicHound Rock: The Essential Album Guide	3/5 stars

The Washington Post called the album Whitley's "best work yet," writing that "it has lots of loud, abrasive guitars, but they ebb and flow, allowing the blues-flavored songwriting to come through clearly and strongly." No Depression wrote that "Whitley's falsetto sounds wonderfully spooky, and his slide playing threatens 'As Flat As The Earth' and 'Immortal Blues' with a naturally sinister feeling." Trouser Press wrote that "much of the record evinces mechanical imagery in titles like 'Gasket' and elliptical lyrics about steel and faulty airplanes." The New York Times wrote that "Whitley infuses [the songs] with a spirit of the blues: a clear-eyed, fatalistic tone that accepts both exaltation and despair."

Nevertheless, Columbia Records dropped Whitley after this album.

== Track listing ==
All tracks written by Chris Whitley.

1. "As Flat as the Earth (exp)" – 1:05
2. "Automatic" – 3:48
3. "Clear Blue Sky" – 5:03
4. "Weightless" – 3:04
5. "Power Down" – 3:53
6. "On Cue" – 3:28
7. "Immortal Blues" – 2:30
8. "Cool Wooden Crosses" – 2:48
9. "Still Point" – 4:17
10. "Gasket" – 4:03
11. "One Long Day" – 2:19
12. "Aerial" – 5:12
13. "Alien" – 4:34

"Automatic" was released as a single.

The CD Extra part of the CD includes interviews with Whitley as well as live video performances of "Weightless", "Power Down", "Cool Wooden Crosses", and "Automatic" culled from his November 4, 1996, performance at Billboard Live at The Palace in Los Angeles, California.

== Personnel ==
- Chris Whitley – vocals, guitar, banjo, and bass
- Dougie Bowne – drums, keyboard, bass, and lime-green guitar solo (5)

Additional personnel

- Daniel Lanois – guitar solo (4)
- Patricia Place – guitar solo (4)
- Louis Lepore – guitar (13)
- Steve Almaas – bass (2, 4, 5, 6)
- Alan Gevaert – bass (3)
- Melvin Gibbs – bass (9, 12)
- Mike Watt – bass solo (10)
- Matt Greenberg – bass (10, 13)
- Brady Blade – drum loop (12)
- John Seymour – organ donor (5)
- Jason Frangos – cello (13)
- Trixie Whitley – backing vocal (2)
- Jessie Lee Montague – backing vocal (6)
