= Chris Whitley =

American blues/rock singer (1960–2005)

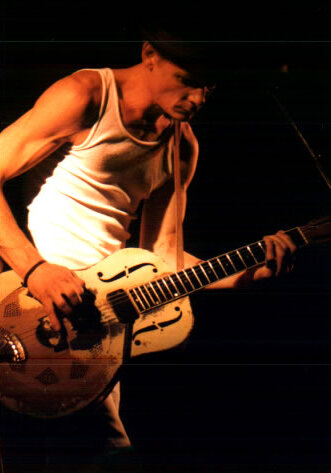
- Chris Whitley in concert in Belgium, 1998

Background information
- Born: Christopher Becker Whitley; August 31, 1960; Houston, Texas
- Died: November 20, 2005 (aged 45); Houston, Texas
- Genres: Blues rock, blues
- Occupations: Musician, songwriter
- Instruments: Vocals, resonator guitar, guitar, banjo, dobro, foot stomp
- Years active: 1983–2005
- Labels: Columbia, Work, Messenger, Valley Entertainment, ATO, Legacy, Sony
- Website: www.chriswhitley.com

Christopher Becker Whitley (August 31, 1960 – November 20, 2005) was an American blues/rock singer-songwriter and guitarist. Whitley's sound was drawn from the traditions of blues, jazz and rock and he recorded songs by artists from many genres. During his 25-year career, he released 17 albums. While two songs landed in the top 50 of the Billboard mainstream rock charts and he received two Independent Music Awards, he remained on the fringes of both the blues and alternative-rock worlds.

He died in 2005 of lung cancer at the age of 45.

== Early life ==
Whitley was born in Houston, Texas to a father who was an art director in corporate advertising and a mother who was a sculptor and painter. He had a three years younger brother named Dan, and a sister named Bridget.

His parents "grew up on race radio in the South" and their musical tastes—including Muddy Waters, Howlin' Wolf, Bob Dylan and Jimi Hendrix—influenced Whitley.

In 1971, his parents moved from Texas to Connecticut and later that year separated. The children continued to live with their mother, who had a hard time providing and was moving from place to place, including hippie communes in Mexico, Oklahoma and in a log cabin in Vermont. At the age of fifteen Whitley taught himself to play guitar by ear, inspired by Jimi Hendrix and Creedence Clearwater Revival. In 1977, he went to New York, working in a Greenwich Village deli.

== Career ==
From 1977 until 1981, Whitley was busking on the streets of New York City and then collaborated with musicians Marc Miller, Arto Lindsay and Michael Beinhorn.

In 1981, he was given a plane ticket to Ghent, Belgium, where he lived for six years. He formed a band named A Noh Rodeo with his girlfriend Helene Gevaert and her brother Alan. He recorded several albums and played with the bands Kuruki, 2 Belgen, Nacht und Nebel, Alan Fawn.

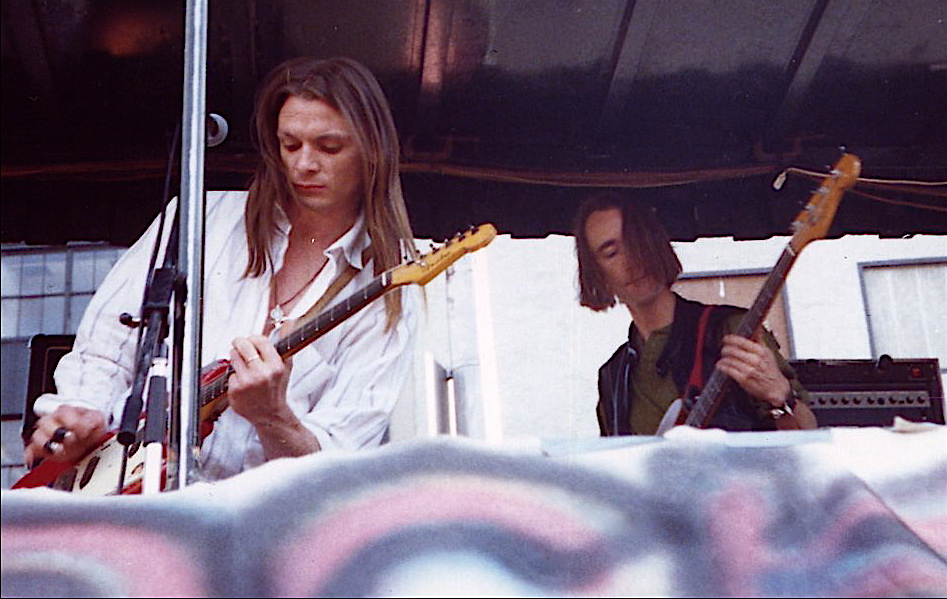
Whitley with Alan Gevaert of Deus in the late 1990s in New York City

In 1988, Whitley moved back to New York. He was introduced to the producer Daniel Lanois, who was instrumental obtaining his first recording contract with Columbia Records and supported him during the recording process.

In 1991, Whitley's debut album was released, and two of his songs charted on the Billboard Mainstream Rock charts: "Big Sky Country" (number 36) and "Living with the Law" (number 28).

From 1997 until his death in 2005 he produced one album each year.

In 1998, he produced his fourth album, Dirt Floor, which was starkly different from his prior three in its acoustic simplicity.

In 2000, Whitley recorded his album Perfect Day, an album of cover songs, with Chris Wood and Billy Martin and followed up with the album Rocket House in 2001. He created annual albums until his death; He collaborated with Jeff Lang on an album called Dislocation Blues in 2005. His last album was Reiter In.

=== Style ===
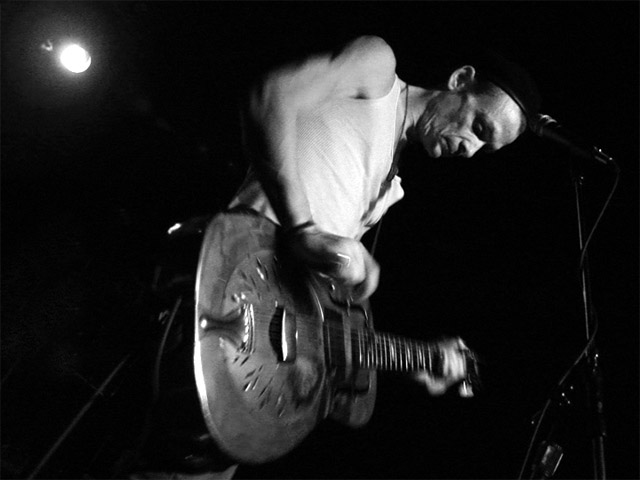
Whitley performing at the 400 Bar in Minneapolis in 2004

Whitley's style drew on an array of influences. In 2001, The New York Times described him as "restless, moving into noise-rock and minimalist jazz evoking Chet Baker and Sonic Youth as much as Robert Johnson". He recorded songs by Robert Johnson and Bob Dylan as well as Lou Reed, James Brown, J.J. Cale, The Clash, Nat King Cole, The Doors, Willie Dixon, The Flaming Lips, Jimi Hendrix, Howlin' Wolf, The Jesus and Mary Chain, Kraftwerk, Gary Numan, The Passions, Prince, The Stooges, and Sonny Boy Williamson II.

Whitley used various alternate tunings and, among other musical instruments, often played slide guitar on a National Triolian resonator guitar nicknamed “Mustard”.

== Personal life and death ==
In 1988, Whitley married the Belgian musician Helen Gevaert. They had a daughter, Trixie Whitley. They divorced in 1995.

In 2001, he moved to Dresden, Germany to live with Susan Buerger who was 17 years younger, and had managed gigs for him. She witnessed his alcoholism which worsened after his mother died in 2004. In the documentary Dust Radio: A Film About Chris Whitley he admits having been through 4 rehabs.

In the spring of 2005, Whitley returned to New York for a US club tour, which he accepted even though his health was declining. In the fall 2005, Whitley canceled his last tour, as he was diagnosed with lung cancer. Five weeks later in November he was reported to be terminally ill and under the care of hospice. He died on November 20, 2005, in Houston, Texas, at the age of 45.

At the time of his death Whitley was survived by his brother Dan and his musician daughter, Trixie Whitley, as well as his father Jerry Whitley in Red Bank, N.J., and sister Bridget Anderson in Saxtons River, Vermont.

== Awards ==
Whitley's song "Breaking Your Fall" from the album Hotel Vast Horizon (2003) won the 3rd Annual Independent Music Awards for Folk/Singer-Songwriter Song. In 2004 he won The 4th Annual Independent Music Award for Blues/R&B Song for his composition "Her Furious Angels" from the album War Crime Blues.

Whitley was an inaugural member of The Independent Music Awards' judging panel to support independent artists

== Posthumous ==
After his death, musician John Mayer said, "[Whitley's] somewhat prostrated place in pop culture earned him a sidebar of an obituary, but to those who knew his work, it registers as one of the most underappreciated losses in all of music." In 2017, the documentary Dust Radio: A Film About Chris Whitley was released.

Notable fans of Whitley's music include, ATO co-founder Dave Matthews, blues guitarist Robert Lockwood, Jr., Bruce Springsteen, John Mellencamp, Bruce Hornsby, Tom Petty, Jacob Golden, Myles Kennedy, Don Henley, Iggy Pop, Alanis Morissette, Sandi Thom, John Mayer, Gavin DeGraw, Joey DeGraw, Johnny A., Joe Bonamassa, Keith Richards.

== Discography ==
- Living with the Law (1991)
- Big Sky Country (single, 1991)
- Din of Ecstasy (1995)
- Terra Incognita (1997)
- Dirt Floor (1998)
- Live at Martyrs' (1999–2000 – recorded live 1999)
- Perfect Day featuring Billy Martin and Chris Wood (2000)
- Rocket House (2001)
- Long Way Around: An Anthology: 1991-2001 (2002)
- Pigs Will Fly (soundtrack) with Warner Poland and Kai-Uwe Kohlschmidt (2003)
- Hotel Vast Horizon (2003)
- Weed (2004)
- War Crime Blues (2004)
- Big Sky Country (2005 Sony BMG release highlighting his Columbia Records years)
- Soft Dangerous Shores (2005)
- Dislocation Blues with Jeff Lang (2006)
- Reiter In with The Bastard Club (2006)
- On Air (2008 – recorded live 2003)
