= Messenger Records =

- Founded: 1996
- Founder: Brandon Kessler
- Country of origin: United States

Messenger Records is an independent record label. Based out of New York City, USA, the label was started by Brandon Kessler during his time in college in 1996.

The label has released albums by Chris Whitley (in 1998 Dirt Floor), Dan Bern (in 2001 New American Language), Anne McCue (in 2004), Johnny Society, and others.

The label also offers consulting services to independent artists, including advice on promotion, touring, and music production.

== See also ==
- List of record labels
