= Sam Barsh =

American jazz musician

- Born: Chicago, Illinois, U.S.
- Education: William Paterson University
- Occupations: Musician; Songwriter; lyricist; record producer
- Years active: 2003–present
- Musical career
- Genres: Pop; R&B; jazz; hip-hop
- Instruments: Keyboards; synthesizers
- Website: sambarsh.com/home

Sam Barsh (born 1981) is an American songwriter, keyboardist and record producer. He has worked in the genres of jazz, R&B, hip-hop and pop.

== Biography ==
Barsh was born in Chicago, IL, and began playing piano at the age of 4. He attended New Trier High School in Winnetka, IL and William Paterson University in Wayne, New Jersey. Barsh moved to New York City in 2001 and currently resides in Los Angeles.

== Career ==
From 2003 to 2006 Barsh was a member of the band of bassist Avishai Cohen, with whom he toured the world extensively. Barsh appears on Cohen's albums At Home and Continuo, and the live album/DVD As Is...Live at the Blue Note.

Between 2008 and 2011, Barsh released three albums as a leader: the independently released Live! and Live Vol. II, and I Forgot What You Taught Me on Razdaz Recordz.

Along with vocalist Jesse Palter, Barsh founded the electronic pop group Jesse Palter and the Alter Ego, (later renamed Palter Ego), in 2009. The group has released 2 EPs and two albums.

In 2013, Barsh co-wrote The Man for Aloe Blacc's album Lift Your Spirit. The song reached #1 on the UK Singles Chart, and #8 on the Billboard Hot 100, and was certified platinum by the RIAA, selling over 2.5 million copies in the US.

Barsh played keyboards on the 2014 Kendrick Lamar song I, which received the award for Best Rap Performance and Best Rap Song at the 2015 Grammy Awards. He composed and played keyboards on the song Institutionalized on Lamar's GRAMMY-winning 2015 album To Pimp a Butterfly.

In 2016, Barsh co-wrote and played on the songs Heart Don't Stand a Chance and Your Prime for Anderson .Paak's Grammy-nominated breakthrough album Malibu, and co-wrote Man Down for BJ the Chicago Kid's Grammy-nominated album In My Mind. In 2017, Barsh co-wrote Logic's Black Spiderman, which won an MTV Video Music Award for "Best Fight Against the System" and was certified Gold by the RIAA.

Barsh co-wrote Logic's Indica Badu feat. Wiz Khalifa from the Billboard #1 album Bobby Tarantino II in 2018. Both the album and single were certified gold by the RIAA. He also co-wrote Elevate by DJ Khalil, featuring Denzel Curry, Cordae, SwaVay and Trevor Rich which was featured in the Academy Award-winning feature Spider-Man: Into the Spider-Verse and the accompanying soundtrack, which was nominated for a GRAMMY award and certified 2× platinum by the RIAA.

In 2019, Barsh released an album titled The Nine, which was commissioned as part of the Skirball Cultural Center's "Notorious RBG" exhibit on the life of US Supreme Court Justice Ruth Bader Ginsburg. The album's collaborators include Aloe Blacc, Justin Tranter, Amber Liu, Sid Sriram, Miles Mosley, Shea Diamond, Christine Gordon, Mic Holden, Samad Savage and Harry Mack.

In 2020, Barsh received a GRAMMY award nomination for Best R&B Song for co-writing the Tiana Major9 feat. EarthGang single Collide, which was featured in the film Queen and Slim. Collide was also awarded "Best Original Song" at the 2020 Black Reel Awards.

Barsh co-wrote 2 songs on Kanye West's 2021 album Donda. "Hurricane" reached #1 on the Rolling Stone Top 100 and multiple Billboard charts, and won a 2022 Grammy Award for Best Melodic Rap Performance. "Moon" reached the top 10 on multiple Billboard charts and was certified platinum by the RIAA.

In 2023 and 2024 Barsh produced and co-wrote songs with Doja Cat, Schoolboy Q, Kali Uchis, and Andy Grammer

Barsh has performed with Babyface, Bobby McFerrin, Boyz II Men, Branford Marsalis, Bruno Mars, Cassandra Wilson, Common, David Foster, Debbie Friedman, Emily King, Estelle, Fred Wesley, Gene Simmons, Gregory Porter, Kenny Wayne Shepherd, Kiran Ahluwalia, Large Professor, Lonnie Plaxico, Mark Ballas, Mino Cinelu, Natasha Bedingfield, Quadron, Ravi Coltrane, Rez Abbasi, Robin Eubanks, Roy Hargrove, Stevie Wonder, Marvin Parks, The Brand New Heavies, and Tom Jones.

== Discography ==
=== 1999 ===
- Song For Tomorrow – Sam Barsh (As Sam Bar-sheshet) (songwriter, piano, keyboard)

=== 2004 ===
- At Home – Avishai Cohen Trio and Ensemble (songwriter, fender rhodes, melodica, organ, piano, vocals)
- So Alive – Lonnie Plaxico (piano, keyboards, organ)
- Two Colors – Russ Nolan (piano)
- Zach Brock and the Coffee Achievers – Zach Brock (songwriter, piano, organ)

=== 2005 ===
- Chemistry – Zach Brock (songwriter, producer, piano, keyboards)
- Finding Space – Rick Parker Collective (piano, synthesizer)
- The Relatives – Jeff Parker (electric piano)

=== 2006 ===
- Continuo – Avishai Cohen (keyboards, piano, handclapping)
- Live at the Jazz Factory – Zach Brock (piano, songwriter)

=== 2007 ===
- As Is...Live at the Blue Note – Avishai Cohen (piano, keyboards, melodica)
- As Is...Live at the Blue Note (DVD) – Avishai Cohen (piano, keyboards, melodica)
- With You in Mind – Russ Nolan featuring the Kenny Werner Trio (producer)

=== 2008 ===
- The Gambler EP – Beyondo (keyboards)
- I Forgot What You Taught Me – Sam Barsh (songwriter, producer, keyboards, melodica, piano)
- Live! – Sam Barsh (songwriter, producer, keyboards)
- Vosotros Presents: The Years – The Years (songwriter, producer, keyboards, melodica)

=== 2009 ===
- Day One – Meilana Gillard (electric piano)
- Evil Genius – Michael Feinberg (piano, keyboards)
- Hypnotic – Gene Segal (songwriter, organ, synthesizer)
- In My Own Company – Jennifer Lee Snowden (producer, piano, organ, melodica)
- Inner Dance – Fabrizio Sotti (organ)
- Limited Edition EP – Palter Ego (as Jesse Palter and the Alter Ego) (songwriter, producer, keyboards)
- Vosotros Presents: The Years Mixtape – The Years (songwriter, producer, keyboards, melodica)

=== 2010 ===
- By the Numbers – Dustin Edge (keyboard, organ)
- PVD and 8th W1 are: Luz Deville – Lux Deville (keyboards)
- Yvette Rovira – Yvette Rovira (songwriter)
  - 01. "Everybody Stand Up"
  - 09. "Psychedelia"
  - 12. "Smile"

=== 2011 ===
- Live Vol. II – Sam Barsh (songwriter, producer, keyboards)
- Sounds Like This! – PVD (keyboards)
  - 01. "One Two (feat. Sam Barsh)"
- We Write Songs – Palter Ego (as Jesse Palter and the Alter Ego) (songwriter, producer, keyboards)
- We Are – Elan (keyboards)

=== 2012 ===
- Agápē – Jojo (keyboards)
  - 01. "Back2thebeginningagain"
- Above the Covers – Palter Ego (producer, keyboards, mixing)
- Dealbreaker – White on Rice featuring Norah Jones (songwriter, producer, keyboards)
- Emuna – Daniel Ori (piano)
- Eviction Notice – Wax (songwriter, producer, keyboards)
  - 09. "Killing Me Inside"
- MoodSwings – Lalana (songwriter, producer, keyboards)
  - 01. "Waitin' (6 O'clock)"
  - 02. "Best of 3"
  - 04. "Operating At the Cost of Love"
  - 06. "Gold"
  - 07. "You Pester Me"
  - 08. "Somethin Bout Nothin"
  - 09. "Lady Freak"
  - 12. "I'm Sold/Apology"
- Soulflower – Robin McKelle (songwriter)
  - 01. "So It Goes"
  - 02. "Tell You One Thing"
  - 03. "Nothing's Really Changed"
  - 04. "Fairytale Ending"
  - 05. "Miss You Madly"
- Violet – Nick Rosen (songwriter, producer, keyboards, mixer)
  - 04. "Blues for Albert"
  - 05. "Eastside/Westside"

=== 2013 ===
- Between Two Evils – Aubrey O'Day (songwriter, keyboards, vocal producer)
  - 08. "Devil & Me"
- Fairytale Ending – Robin Mckelle (songwriter)
- I Lost My Coachella Ticket – Kosha Dillz (songwriter, producer, keyboards)
- Id, Ego, Palter Ego – Palter Ego (songwriter, producer, keyboards)
- The Man – Aloe Blacc (songwriter, keyboards)
- Maurice vs. Mobetta – Maurice Brown (songwriter, producer, vocals, keyboards)
  - 02. "The Connection (feat. Sam Barsh)

=== 2014 ===
- Control Yourself – Opolopo Remix – Robin Mckelle (songwriter)
- Enter the Dynasty – Dontae Winslow and Winslow Dynasty (piano, keyboards)
  - 06. "Blaxploitation and Revolutions (feat. the West Coast Get Down)" (piano, nord lead)
  - 09. "2304 West North Avenue"
- Heart of Memphis – Robin Mckelle and the Flytones (songwriter)
  - 01. "About to Be Your Baby"
  - 04. "Control Yourself"
  - 08. "Easier That Way"
- i – Kendrick Lamar (keyboards)
- Lift Your Spirit – Aloe Blacc (songwriter, keyboards)
  - 02. "The Man"
  - 08. "Red Velvet Seat"
- Modern Vintage – John Robinson and PVD (songwriter, keyboards)
  - 06. "What's the Point"
- The Way – Macy Gray (songwriter, keyboards)
  - 10. "Life"
- The Worst – Van Ike (songwriter, producer, keyboards, vocals)

=== 2015 ===
- All We Need – Raury (songwriter, keyboards)
  - 07. "Peace Prevail"
- Free TC – Ty Dolla Sign (songwriter, keyboards)
  - 17. "Finale"
- Southpaw (Music from and Inspired by the Motion Picture) – Various Artists (keyboards)
  - 02. "Kings Never Die (Eminem featuring Gwen Stefani)
- The Incredible True Story – Logic (songwriter, keyboards)
  - 18. "The Incredible True Story"
- To Pimp a Butterfly – Kendrick Lamar (songwriter, keyboards)
  - 04. "Institutionalized" (featuring Bilal, Anna Wise and Snoop Dogg
  - 15. "i"
- Way to Be – Amanda Brecker (piano, keyboards, organ)
- Misunderstood – Ethan Tucker (keyboards, organ)

=== 2016 ===
- Malibu – Anderson .Paak (songwriter, keyboards)
  - 02. "Heart Don't Stand a Chance"
  - 12. "Your Prime"
- In My Mind – BJ the Chicago Kid (songwriter, keyboards)
  - 02. "Man Down"
- Always Strive and Prosper – ASAP Ferg (songwriter, keyboards, trumpet)
  - 01. "Rebirth"
  - 05. "Psycho"
  - 11. "Beautiful People"
  - 18. "Grandma"
- Back To Me – Shana Halligan (songwriter, keyboards)
  - 04. "Something Real"
- The Birth of a Nation: The Inspired By Album – Various Artists (songwriter, keyboards, string arranging)
  - 14. "Forward" (K. Michelle)
- Stripped – Macy Gray (songwriter)
  - 09. "The Heart"
- Beautiful Broken – Heart (songwriter)
  - 02. "Two"
- 61 Barkly – Jakubi (songwriter, keyboards)
  - 02. "Uptown Lady"
- The Name EP – SonReal (songwriter, keyboards)
  - 04. "Hot Air Balloon"
- State of Mind – Nipsey Hussle ft. Y2 (songwriter, keyboards)
- D.R.U.G.S. – Rejjie Snow (songwriter, keyboards)
- The Deal – Palter Ego (songwriter, producer, keyboards, engineering)

=== 2017 ===
- 4eva Is a Mighty Long Time – Big K.R.I.T. (songwriter, keyboards)
  - 10. (Disc one: Big K.R.I.T.) "Aux Cord"
  - 11. (Disc two: Justin Scott) "Bury Me in Gold"
- All-Amerikkkan Badass – Joey Badass (songwriter, keyboards)
  - 01. "Good Morning Amerikkka"
  - 02. "For My People"
  - 12. "Amerikkkan Idol"
- Everybody – Logic (songwriter, keyboards)
  - 08. "Mos Definitely"
  - 12. "Black Spiderman"
- East Coast – ASAP Ferg (songwriter, keyboards)
- Half Hearted – Finn Matthews (songwriter, producer, keyboards)
- The Mugician – Keyon Harrold (keyboards)
  - 5. "Wayfaring Traveler"
  - 6. "Stay This Way"
- Rather You Than Me – Rick Ross (songwriter, keyboards)
  - 10. "Scientology"
- Rebirth of the Cool – Nick Grant (songwriter, keyboards)
  - 01. "Sometimes"
  - 07. "PPIPP"
- The Transition of Mali – Mali Music (songwriter, keyboards)
  - 01. "Worth It"
- Bright: The Album – Various Artists
  - 09. "FTW (F**k the World)" (featuring ASAP Rocky and Tom Morello)
- Still Striving – ASAP Ferg (songwriter, keyboards)
  - 12. "East Coast REMIX (featuring Busta Rhymes, French Montana, Dave East, Snoop Dogg, Rick Ross and ASAP Rocky)

=== 2018 ===
- Bobby Tarantino II – Logic (songwriter, keyboards)
  - 06. "Indica Badu" (featuring Wiz Khalifa)
- Dreamin' Out Loud – Nick Grant (songwriter, keyboards)
  - 14. "The Ode" (featuring Sonyae Elise)
- Eclectic Excursions – Nabate Isles (producer all tracks; keyboards tracks 1, 2, 7, 14–16; songwriter and mix engineer tracks 2, 16)
  - 01. "Inception"
  - 02. "Laid Back" (featuring Elzhi and JRDN)
  - 03. "Find Your Light" (featuring Alita Moses)
  - 04. "Funkdafied"
  - 05. "Exchanging Pleasantries"
  - 06. "Sultriness"
  - 07. "Grab Her by the What?!*&#$!?"
  - 08. "Minute Pieces of Wozzeck"
  - 09. "Mello D.E.M."
  - 10. "Cubicle"
  - 11. "Jubilation for Closure"
  - 12. "Pomponio"
  - 13. "Strange Fruit"
  - 14. "For the End"
  - 15. "2 of a Kind" (Bonus Track)
  - 16. "Laid Back Instrumental (Bonus Track)
- November – SiR (songwriter, keyboards)
  - 01. "Gone"
  - 09. "Better"
- New Change – Sarah Reich (producer, songwriter, mix engineer track 9; keyboards tracks 5, 9, 10, 15)
  - 05. "It's Tappening"
  - 09. "The Groove"
  - 10. "New Change"
  - 15. "Gemini Vibe" (featuring Lee How)
- Book of Ryan – Royce da 5'9" (songwriter, keyboards)
  - 09. "Life is Fair"
- Quarterthing – Joey Purp (songwriter, keyboards)
  - 02. "Godbody Pt. 2" (featuring RZA)
- Rolling Papers 2 – Wiz Khalifa (songwriter, keyboards)
  - 20. "B Ok"
- Testing – ASAP Rocky (songwriter, keyboards)
  - 13. "Changes"
- YSIV – Logic (songwriter, keyboards, trumpet)
  - 02. "Everybody Dies"
- Music for People – Genr8r (keyboards; songwriter tracks 3,4,7)
  - 01. "First Offense"
  - 02. "Gone"
  - 03. "BB&J (interlude/intro)"
  - 04. "BB&J"
  - 05. "Over It"
  - 06. "N.C.M.S."
  - 07. "OSSO"
  - 08. "Smash"
  - 09. "Find Your Way"
- Spider-Man: Into the Spider-Verse (soundtrack) – Various Artists (songwriter, keyboards)
  - 12. "Elevate" – DJ Khalil feat. Denzel Curry, YBN Cordae, SwaVay & Trevor Rich
- Mimi – Bad Rabbits (producer, songwriter, keyboards, engineer)
  - 06. "Dollars and Change"

=== 2019 ===
- The RISE UP Project – J.Period (songwriter, keyboards, trumpet)
  - 04. "See The Light" (feat. Andra Day and Dead Prez)
- Queen & Slim: The Soundtrack – Various Artists (songwriter, keyboards)
  - 04. "Collide" – Tiana Major9 feat. EarthGang
- Rise (from Godfather of Harlem Soundtrack) – Samm Henshaw (songwriter, keyboards)
- Nobody Cares Except You – Kosha Dillz (producer, songwriter, keyboards)
- Exercise – Kosha Dillz (producer, songwriter, keyboards)
- Logic Became Me – Kosha Dillz (producer, songwriter, keyboards)
- Hide – Tamir (producer, keyboards)
- Spotify Singles – Sam Barsh and The Deli (producer, keyboards; songwriter track 1)
  - 01. "Constellations"
  - 02. "Misty"
- Clydesdales and Castles – Sam Barsh (producer, songwriter, keyboards)
- You Want My Cup – Sam Barsh (producer, songwriter, keyboards)
- The Nine – Sam Barsh (producer, songwriter, keyboards, engineer)
  - 01. "Nothing's Wrong (2:40)" feat. Samad Savage
  - 02. "Soldier Story" (feat. Mic Holden and Sunny Bey)
  - 03. "Truth" (feat. Aloe Blacc)
  - 04. "Like You" (feat. Amber Liu)
  - 05. "Rose Garden" (feat. Harry Mack, Mz.007 and Van Ike)
  - 06. "Ballad of the 3 Officers Johnson" (feat. Myth Wazir)
  - 07. "Thank You" (feat. Shea Diamond)
  - 08. "Unholy Water" (feat. Christine Gordon, Niles and Myth Wazir)
  - 09. "Bear Arms" (feat. Mic Holden)
  - 10. "Three Fifths" (feat. Mic Holden and Myth Wazir)
  - 11. "Last Line of Defense" (feat. Myth Wazir)
- Curiosity – Amber Liu (producer, songwriter, keyboards)
- Paper Trail – Jesse Palter (songwriter)
  - 04. "Waitin"
  - 07. "Heart So Cold"
- Dirt Road Diamond – Childish Major (producer, songwriter, keyboards)
  - 01. "Necessary Pressure"
- Where Do I Start – Joel Matthew (producer, songwriter, keyboards, engineer)
  - 01. "Where Do I Start"
  - 02. "An Ode"
  - 03. "Rockstar"
  - 04. "Lost in L.A. Interlude"
  - 05. "Lost in Los Angeles"
  - 06. "Down This Road" (feat. Gabe Roland)
- Contents Under Pressure – Harry Mack (producer, songwriter, keyboards, engineer)
  - 04. "Go For Mine"
- So It Goes – Henry Canyons feat. OLLIE CHANIN (producer, songwriter, keyboards, engineer)

=== 2020 ===
- Still Be Friends – G Eazy feat. Tory Lanez and Tyga (songwriter)
- Streetlight – Yakul (producer, mix engineer)
- Company – Yakul (producer, mix engineer)
- For The Ones – Kosha Dillz feat. Matisyahu (producer, songwriter, keyboards)
- The Jazzy Beats EP – Sam Barsh (producer, songwriter, engineer)
  - 1. "Fafa"
  - 2. "3 Out of 5"
  - 3. "Bay to Ventura"
  - 4. "The Jade Rule"
- Juicy – Olivia Kuper Harris (producer, songwriter, keyboards, engineer)
  - 11. "Burn This Bridge"
  - 12. "Check"
- Everlasting – Loyal Lobos (songwriter)
  - 7. "Everlasting"
- Worth It – ZieZie feat. S1mba and Stylo G (songwriter)
- The Jazzy Beats EP Remixes – Auxjack and Sam Barsh (producer, songwriter, engineer)
  - 1. "Fafa" (Auxjack Remix)
  - 2. "3 Out of 5" (Auxjack Remix)
  - 3. "Bay to Ventura" (Auxjack Remix)
  - 4. "The Jade Rule" (Auxjack Remix)
- Forbidden Fruit – Lynn Cardona (producer, keyboards)
- Running Back to You – Lynn Cardona (producer, keyboards)
- Counting Sheep – Lynn Cardona (producer, keyboards)
- Nobody Cares Except You – Kosha Dillz (producer, songwriter, engineer)
  - 1. "Nobody Cares Except You"
  - 2. "For the Ones" feat. Matisyahu
  - 4. "Exercise"
  - 7. "Real Me"
  - 9. "Age"
  - 10. "Never Ever Have I"
  - 11. "They know what my name is"
  - 12. "Tommy Pickles"
  - 13. "Solo" feat. Gangsta Boo
  - 14. "End of the Night"
- A Motown Holiday – Various Artists (songwriter, keyboards)
  - 1. "All I Want" – Asiahn
- Beat Tape, Vol. 1: Mood Side of the Barsh – Sam Barsh (producer, songwriter, keyboards)
  - 1. "Wavy Baby"
  - 2. "Finny"
  - 3. "Road Dog for Life"
  - 4. "Symarshall"
  - 5. "Turkey Bacon and Cheese"
- Beat Tape, Vol. 2: Trap Side of the Barsh – Sam Barsh (producer, songwriter, keyboards)
  - 1. "Me Say Baywater"
  - 2. "Death Vali"
  - 3. "Deep Out"
  - 4. "Ratchet Doctor"
  - 5. "Modestly Priced Receptacle"
- Beat Tape, Vol. 3: Crate Side of the Barsh – Sam Barsh (producer, songwriter, keyboards)
  - 1. "Fine Toothed Chrome"
  - 2. "Respect Old Arrangements"
  - 3. "Reclinerboy"
  - 4. "Peppermint Patek"
- Beat Tape, Vol. 4: Drip Side of the Barsh – Sam Barsh (producer, songwriter, keyboards)
  - 1. "Dangit"
  - 2. "Willflower"
  - 3. "Sussy the Ghost"
  - 4. "Cel Blox"
  - 5. "Trimming the Treason"

=== 2021 ===
- Donda – Kanye West
  - 5. "Hurricane" feat. The Weeknd and Lil Baby
  - 13. "Moon" feat. Don Toliver and Kid Cudi
- Notes to Self – Van Ike, Sam Barsh (producer (except track 7), songwriter (except track 4), keyboards, vocals)
  - 1. "Never Wanted to Love You"
  - 2. "Can't Get Away From You"
  - 3. "Away For The Day"
  - 4. "The Worst"
  - 5. "Every Single Day"
  - 6. "3D Movie"
  - 7. "Never Wanted to Love You – Brother in Arms Remix"
- Over This – PONO (songwriter, keyboards)
- Preacher's Kid – Butterfly Ali (producer, songwriter, keyboards, mix engineer)
  - 1. "Testimony"
  - 2. "Pray for 'Em"
- Why Would I Stop (Theme from the Podcast "The Vaping Fix") – Sam Barsh feat$. tarborn (producer, songwriter, keyboards, mix engineer)
- Sak Pase – Jervsalem (producer, songwriter, keyboards, mix engineer)
- Fight Fa – Jervsalem (producer, songwriter, keyboards, mix engineer)
- USEE4YOURSELF – IDK (keyboards)
  - 14. "Peloton"
  - 31. "Peloton – Instrumental"
- Elevate featuring Will Claye – Original Score (composer, keyboards)
- Kingfisher – Wiley From Atlanta (producer, songwriter, engineer, keyboards)
  - 1. "No Vacancies"
- Endless – Cameron Forbes (producer, songwriter, keyboards, engineer)
- Get Big – $tarborn (producer, songwriter, keyboards, engineer)
- If I Was White – Cameron Forbes (producer, keyboards, engineer)
- Real Wild Child (Wild One) – Skylet Gunner (producer, keyboards, engineer)

=== 2022 ===
- Tana Talk 4 – Benny the Butcher (songwriter, keyboards)
  - 1. "Johnny P's Caddy" feat. J. Cole
- Coal – IDK (songwriter, keyboards)
- Black Market with Michael K. Williams – Main Theme (composer, keyboards)
- That Boy Across The Street Short Feature – Original Score (composer, producer, keyboards, mix engineer, mastering engineer)
- Yam Grier – Zyah Belle (producer, songwriter, keyboards)
  - 2. "Holding On" (feat. Jay Wile, Aj Claire)
  - 3. "Goofy" (feat. Tempest, Aj Claire)
  - 4. "Love Me Now"
  - 5. "DND"
  - 14. "Go"
- Harlem Shake – Nabate Isles (producer, keyboards)
- The Sound of Luxury Vol. 1 – Olivia Pucci (producer, engineer, mix engineer)
  - 1. "U Got It Bad"
  - 2. "Are You That Somebody"
  - 3. "Let Me Love You"
  - 4. "Just Friends (Sunny)"
  - 5. "It Was a Good Day"
  - 6. "American Boy"
  - 7. "Waterfalls"
  - 8. "Gin & Juice"
  - 9. "No Scrubs"
  - 10. "Safe in Your Arms"
- Ice In The Clouds – No Xtra feat. Maiya Sykes (producer, songwriter, keyboards)
  - 1. "Keep Holding On"
  - 2. "Ice In The Clouds"
  - 3. "Away To Nowhere"
  - 4. "Summertime Habit"
  - 5. "Over The Edge"
- Anxiety – Jervsalem (producer, songwriter, engineer, mix engineer, mastering engineer)
- S.S.A.B. – $tarborn (producer, songwriter, engineer, mix engineer, mastering engineer)
  - 3. "We On"
  - 4. "Hunnid Bands"
- Starborn – $tarborn (producer, songwriter, engineer, mix engineer, mastering engineer)
  - 2. "Life Takes Time"
  - 3. "Confiscate It"
  - 4. "Pick Yo Head Up"
  - 6. "9 to 5"
- Moments – Pono (songwriter, keyboards)
  - 1. "In The Middle"
  - 2. "Mistakes"
- Ride Away – Genr8r feat. Nic Jackson (producer, songwriter, keyboards, engineer)
- Sticky Sauce – Sam Barsh (producer, songwriter, keyboards)
  - 1. "Sticky Sauce"
  - 2. "Go Against The Family"
  - 3. "Drunken Noodles"
  - 4. "Can't Tie A Tie"
  - 5. "Tied Up In Trees"
  - 6. "Lonely Dice"
  - 7. "Leopard Prince"
  - 8. "3 Bills And A Soda"
  - 9. "Kev Infinity"
  - 10. "FTSQ"
  - 11. "Buona Sera"
  - 12. "No Hateration"
  - 13. "Lalana's Lament"
- Beat Tape, Vol. 13: To The Moon And Back – Sam Barsh (producer, songwriter, keyboards)
  - 1. "Policy Wonk"
  - 2. "Sue's Dark Side"
  - 3. "Sully My Name"
  - 4. "The Noble Man"
  - 5. "The Sinmaster"
  - 6. "Ticky Tack"
  - 7. "To The Moon And Back"
  - 8. "Warranty Sham"
  - 9. "Wean At All Costs"
- Beat Tape, Vol. 12: Don't Look Twice – Sam Barsh (producer, songwriter, keyboards)
  - 1. "20 Minutes from Stardom"
  - 2. "Don't Look Twice"
  - 3. "Event Planning"
  - 4. "Our Bar"
  - 5. "Out of Oranges"
  - 6. "Pace of Life"
  - 7. "Pezzo Novante"
  - 8. "Pink Tiger"
- Beat Tape Vol. 11: Pay Patience – Sam Barsh (producer, songwriter, keyboards)
  - 1. Layover Stayover
  - 2. "Holding Courts"
  - 3. "91 Degrees"
  - 4. "Seal Sand"
  - 5. "MRTS"
  - 6. "Olive Sampler"
  - 7. "Deceptive Dealer"
  - 8. "Pay Patience"
  - 9. "New Turf"
  - 10. "Downdate"
- Steps Of The Stoop – Sam Barsh (producer, songwriter, keyboards)
  - 1. "Smooth Perpetrator"
  - 2. "Collateralized"
  - 3. "Citizen Gee"
  - 4. "Steps Of The Stoop"
  - 5. "Stafford Infection"
  - 6. "Still Damp"
  - 7. "Green Shield"
  - 8. "A Walk Through Midwood"
  - 9. "Flight Night"
  - 10. "13 Out 1 In"
  - 11. "Benny's Drill"
  - 12. "Clinkin And Clankin"
- Clouds of Violet – Sam Barsh (producer, songwriter, keyboards)
  - 1. "LGB"
  - 2. "Tai Chi Evenings"
  - 3. "Praise Pays"
  - 4. "Clouds of Violet"
  - 5. "Window Pains"
  - 6. "Lazy Evenings"
  - 7. "Not On The Team"
  - 8. "Bad Testing"
  - 9. "Let's Be Three"

=== 2023 ===
- Scarlet – Doja Cat (producer, engineer, keyboards)
  - 6. "97"
- En Motion – Nabate Isles (producer-all tracks; keyboards 2, 4, 5, 8–13)
  - 1. "The Jump Off"
  - 2. "Black Girl Magic" (feat. Badia Farha, Mumu Fresh, Nikki Grier)
  - 3. "Harlem Shake"
  - 4. "Bate's Letter from MistaChuck" (feat. Chuck D)
  - 5. "Reality" (feat. Kardinal Offishall)
  - 6. "Perfect Cadence"
  - 7. "Septune"
  - 8. "Cristo Redentor"
  - 9. "Iso"
  - 10. "Lush"
  - 11. "The Smoke"
  - 12. "La Fiesta"
  - 13. "Fatherly Bond"
- Love Without Conditions – Zombie Juice (producer, songwriter, keyboards, engineer)
  - 3. "Terpalation" (feat. Currensy)
- Red Moon in Venus – Kali Uchis (songwriter, keyboards)
  - 15. "Happy Now"
- Falls to Pieces – Pat Van Dyke (keyboards)
  - 6. "Shine" (For Joey) feat. Sam Barsh
- Trip. – Kemi Ade (producer, songwriter, keyboards, engineer)
- Love You Forever – Vérité (producer, songwriter, keyboards, engineer, trumpet)
  - 8. "I Thought I Was Waiting"
- They Cloned Tyrone (Music From and Inspired by the Netflix Film) (producer, engineer, keyboards, mix engineer)
  - 9. "Feelin' Good" (feat. Saba and Uncle See'J)
- Cool Girl – Bente Violet (producer, songwriter, keyboards, engineer, mix engineer)
- Missing Piece – Bente Violet (producer, songwriter, keyboards, engineer, mix engineer)
- I'm Her – Princess Chloe and Becca Brazil (producer, songwriter, keyboards, engineer, mix engineer)
- LOBA Vol. 1 – Loyal Lobos (producer, engineer, songwriter, keyboards)
  - 1. "Tengo Sed"
- Typical Day – Jesse Palter and Sam Barsh (producer, songwriter, keyboards, engineer, vocal producer, mix engineer)
- Alma Perdida – Nancy Sanchez (keyboards)
- BNG TENNIS CLUB – Tom Ford and Phundo Art (producer, songwriter, keyboards, engineer)
  - 3. "Letter4"
- Sounds Like Home – Captain Planet (keyboards, songwriter)
  - 8. "Break Through To My Heart" (feat. Maiya Sykes)

=== 2024 ===
- i thought i was waiting (bronze vases remix) – VÉRITÉ and Bronze Vases (songwriter)
- Ignore The Comments – Sam Barsh (producer, songwriter, engineer, keyboards-all tracks)
- Ferrari – Jervsalem (producer, songwriter, keyboards, engineer, mix engineer)
- Partition – Sam Barsh Trio (piano, producer, mix engineer)
- DON'T GROW UP TOO SOON – Nascent (producer, songwriter, piano)
  - 3. "U Shoulda Been There" feat. Saba
- Cafe's Closed – Sam Barsh (producer, songwriter, engineer, keyboards-all tracks)
- Don't Forget to Breathe – Buddy (producer, songwriter, keyboards)
  - 6. "Get It All" (feat. pineappleCITI)
- Areas of Focus – Sam Barsh (producer, songwriter, engineer, keyboards-all tracks)
- Without You – Andy Grammer (producer, songwriter, vocal producer, engineer)
- BLUE LIPS – Schoolboy Q (producer, keyboards, engineer)
  - 15. "Germany 86'"
- Institutionalized – Sam Barsh Trio (piano, producer, songwriter, mix engineer)
- Honey Don't – Skylet Gunner and Sam Barsh (producer, keyboards, engineer)
- Straight, No Chase – Jourden (songwriter, keyboards)
  - 4. "Picture Perfect"
- Dust on the Desk – Sam Barsh (producer, songwriter, engineer, keyboards-all tracks)
- Demetri Deconstructed Comedy Special – Demetri Martin (keyboards)
- Phitt Cheque – Sam Barsh (producer, songwriter, engineer, keyboards-all tracks)
- J.PERIOD Presents...Story To Tell (Chapter Two) (songwriter, keyboards)
  - 2. "Hot Sauce" feat. Andra Day and Aloe Blacc
- Cloud Lifter – Sam Barsh (producer, songwriter, engineer, keyboards-all tracks)
- elvis, he was Schlager – Church Chords (keyboards)
  - 4. Alone Under the Water feat. Kristin Slipp
  - 10. Man on Wire feat. Kristin Slipp
- Bad Headlines – Sam Barsh (producer, songwriter, engineer, keyboards-all tracks)
- Hyper Realist – Sam Barsh (producer, songwriter, engineer, keyboards-all tracks)

== Awards and nominations ==
Barsh was a nominee for the 2021 GRAMMY Award for Best R&B Song for co-writing the Tiana Major9 feat. EarthGang single "Collide."

He was nominated for the 2022 Grammy Award for Album of the Year for his work on Kanye West's Donda. Barsh co-wrote the Kanye West song Hurricane feat. The Weeknd and Lil Baby, which won the 2022 Grammy Award for Best Melodic Rap Performance.

In 2024, Barsh was inducted into New Trier High School's Alumni Hall of Honor.

He was the recipient of two 2015 BMI Awards, the US R&B Hip-Hop award and the London Pop Award.

Barsh was a nominee for the Ashford and Simpson Songwriter Award at the 2014 Soul Train Awards.

His composition Black Spiderman was Awarded a 2017 MTV Video Music award for "Best Fight Against the System."

Barsh's work as a composer and keyboardist has received 3 additional GRAMMY Awards out of 9 nominations.

- Aloe Blacc Lift Your Spirit - 2015 Best R&B Album (nominated)
- Kendrick Lamar i - 2015 Best Rap Song (won) and Best Rap Performance (won)
- Kendrick Lamar To Pimp A Butterfly - 2016 Best Rap Album (won) and Album of the Year (nominated)
- Anderson .Paak Malibu - 2017 Best Urban Contemporary Album (nominated)
- BJ the Chicago Kid In My Mind - 2017 Best R&B Album (nominated)
- Ledisi Let Love Rule - 2018 Grammy Award for Best R&B Album (nominated)
- Spider-Man: Into the Spider-Verse - 2020 Grammy Award for Best Compilation Soundtrack for Visual Media (nominated)

He was awarded a 2000 Downbeat Magazine Student Award for Best Jazz Instrumental Soloist.
