= Inner Dance =

Studio album by Fabrizio Sotti
- Released: 2010
- Genre: Jazz

Fabrizio Sotti chronology
Through My Eyes (2004)	Inner Dance (2010)	Right Now (2013)

Inner Dance is a 2010 solo album written and produced by Italian jazz guitarist Fabrizio Sotti. The album was recorded at both Avatar Studios and Sotti Studios in New York City in February and April 2009.

Inner Dance was recorded and mixed by Roy Hendrickson, with additional recording by Fabrizio Sotti and Giorgio Piovan.

The album is dedicated to Sotti's mother, Cristina, and was released by E1 Entertainment.

== Track listing ==
All songs written by Fabrizio Sotti except for #5, by Fabrizio Sotti and Claudia Acuna.

1. Blue Whisper
2. Kindness in Your Eyes
3. Inner Dance (featuring Gregoire Maret)
4. I Thought So
5. Amanecer (featuring Claudia Acuna)
6. Brief Talk
7. Last Chance
8. Mr. T.M.
9. We Are What We Are

== Personnel ==
- Fabrizio Sotti – electric guitar, nylon string guitar
- Sam Barsh – organ
- Victor Jones – drums
- Mino Cinelu – drums and percussion
- Gregoire Maret – harmonica on "Inner Dance"
- Claudia Acuna – vocals on "Amanecer"
- Produced by Fabrizio Sotti
- Recording Engineer – Roy Hendrickson
- Assistant Engineers – Akihiro Nishimura and Ilaria Ceccarelli
- Mastering – Alan Silverman at Arf! Digital
