= This World UpSide Down =

This World Upside Down

Studio album by Fabrizio Sotti
- Released: 1999
- Genre: Jazz
- Length: 48:48

This World Upside Down is the American debut album by Italian jazz guitarist Fabrizio Sotti.

The album was recorded with Al Foster, John Patitucci, and Randy Brecker.

== Track listing ==
All tracks are written by Fabrizio Sotti except where noted

| No. | Title | Length |
|---|---|---|
| 1. | "Autumn Leaves" (Joseph Kosma/Jacques Prévert/Johnny Mercer) | 4:03 |
| 2. | "This World Upside Down" | 4:17 |
| 3. | "After a Prayer" | 6:11 |
| 4. | "I'll Remember April" (Gene de Paul/Patricia Johnston/Don Raye) | 4:28 |
| 5. | "Days of Wine and Roses" (Henry Mancini) | 8:01 |
| 6. | "On Green Dolphin Street" (Bronisław Kaper/Ned Washington) | 3:41 |
| 7. | "Within All of Us" | 4:35 |
| 8. | "Heretic Blues" | 5:59 |
| 9. | "Until When" | 5:17 |
| 10. | "Showplace Mood" | 2:14 |

== Credits ==
- Fabrizio Sotti – guitars, producer
- Randy Brecker – trumpet
- John Patitucci – double bass
- James Genus – double bass
- Cameron Brown – double bass
- Al Foster – drums
- Victor Jones – drums
- Greg Russell – executive producer
- Ben Elliot – engineer
- Rob Reyes – assistant engineer
- Chris Athens – mastering
