= Continuo =

Continuo may refer to:

- Basso continuo, a textural feature of Baroque music; also the group of instruments that plays the basso continuo part
- Continuo (album), a 2006 album by Avishai Cohen
- Continuo (game), an abstract strategy game
