= Nitai Hershkovits =

Israeli jazz pianist and composer

Nitai Hershkovits ניתאי הרשקוביץ
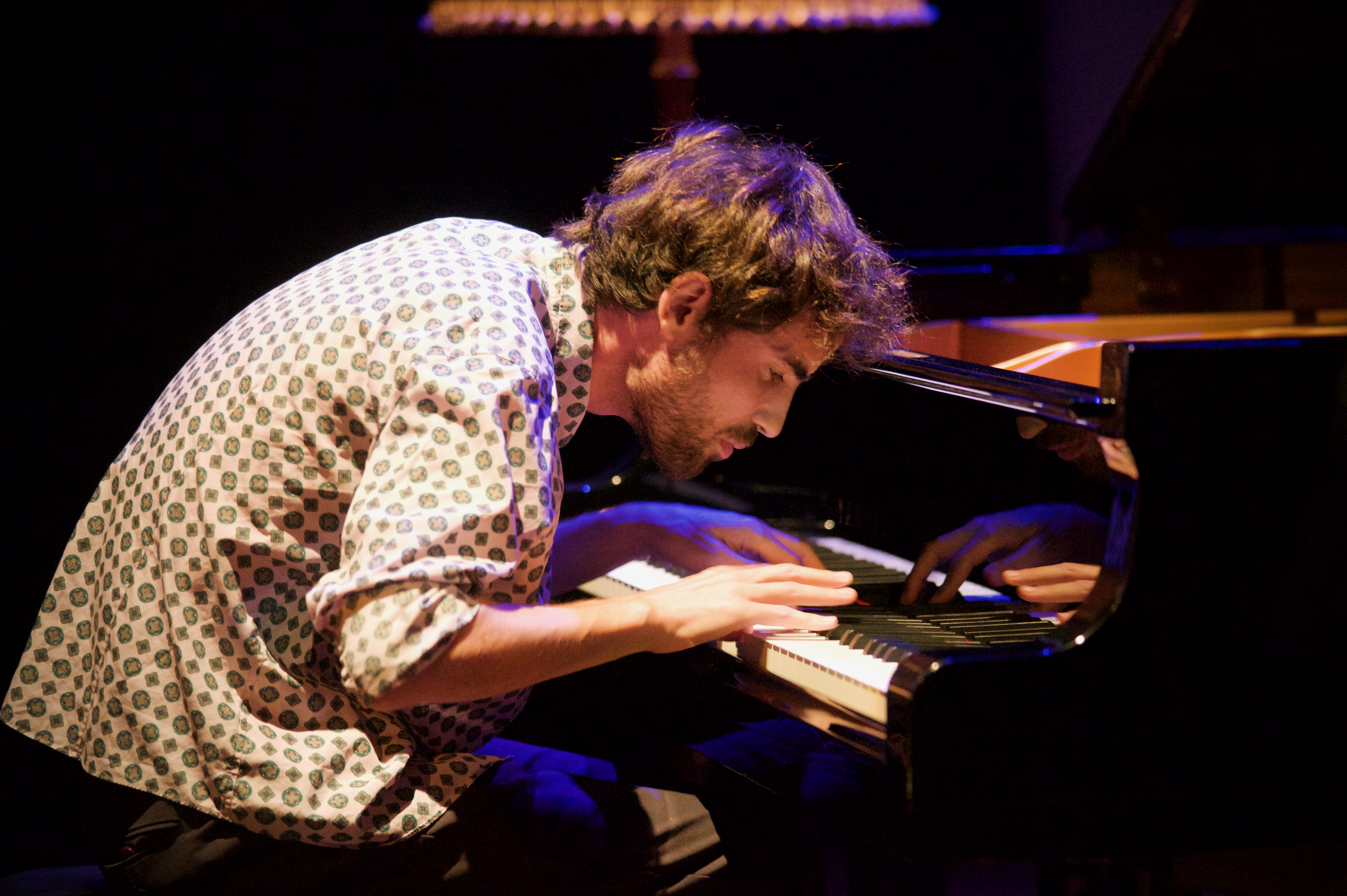
- Nitai Hershkovits, 2021

Background information
- Born: February 21, 1988 (age 38)
- Origin: Israel
- Genres: Jazz; Ambient; jazz fusion; funk
- Occupations: Musician, composer, bandleader
- Instrument: Piano
- Labels: ECM, Raw Tapes, Enja
- Website: nitaihmusic.com

Nitai Hershkovits (Hebrew: ניתאי הרשקוביץ; born 21 February 1988) is a jazz pianist and composer.

== Biography ==
=== Early life ===
Hershkovits was born in Israel to Eva and Ilan Hershkovits. He started playing the clarinet at the age of twelve and three years after, at the age of fifteen, he changed his musical instrument and start playing the piano. By the age of seventeen, Hershkovits already won several jazz competitions, which led him to move to Tel Aviv, there he managed to combine regular school with private music and piano lessons under the guidance of jazz educators Amit Golan and Yuval Cohen. During his time in school, he soon became interested in a rich variety of both classical and jazz music, writing arrangements for bands from the "Israel Conservatory of Music" in Tel Aviv. These experiences led him to study classical music and theory with Israeli composer and educator, Dr. Menahem Weisenberg and classical piano educator Shoshana Cohen and Amir Pedorovits.

Between the years 2004 and 2010, he was awarded four times in a row the highest scholarship given by the America-Israel Cultural Foundation (AICF). Another highlight was in 2009 when he got the prestigious Chase Scholarship award, sponsoring a Bachelor’s degree at the "Jerusalem Rubin Academy of Music". In a short time he realized that the institution setting was not suitable for him, and developed his own taste and repertoire by taking private lessons and listening to wide variety of music.

=== Career ===
In the midst of 2011, Hershkovits started working with bassist Avishai Cohen. Their first album together, Duende, a piano and bass Duet, was released in 2012. His playing on this album was described by the critic John Fordham as "somewhat reminiscent of a silky-toned old piano swinger such as the late Hank Jones". As part of Avishai Cohen Trio, they recorded two more albums together: Almah, a chamber music project (2013) and From Darkness, a trio album (2015). During their collaborative work, Hershkovits dove into classical music and was also Cohen’s musical director of his strings project and a few others. Together they toured and performed at many different venues and diverse music festivals all over the world, such as: North Sea Jazz Festival, Village Vanguard, Antibes Jazz Festival, Jazz à Vienne, Montreux Jazz Festival.

In 2016, Hershkovits decided to move to New York. His last tour with Cohen's trio was with guitarist Kurt Rosenwinkel and a few other musicians from New York, he grew up listening to. In New York he began playing and recording in numerous groups, among them Ari Hoenig group and Oded Tzur's quartet (Hershkovits played in Tzur's albums, Here Be Dragons (2020), Isabela (2022) and My Prophet (2024))

Hershkovits’ debut album, I Asked You A Question (Raw Tapes Records), was released in February 2016. The album, Co-produced with Rejoicer, features him on vocals, piano, and synths. In addition, participants in the album also, Los Angeles-based singer, Brainfeeder artist, Georgia Anne Muldrow, and guitarist Kurt Rosenwinkel, on two tracks ("Satellite Dish" and "My Turn").

Hershkovits’ second solo album, New Place Always, was written primarily for solo piano and released in 2018. In this album he continued collaborating with Rejoicer and together they wrote in the studio eight of the tunes. In addition, there is in the album also one instrumental arrangement to Paul McCartney's song, "Jenny Wren" (from his album, Chaos and Creation in the Backyard).

In 2020, Hershkovits joined three other musicians: Yuval Havkin, Rejoicer (keyboards), Amir Bresler (drums) and Yonatan Albalak (bass), and together the four formed a group called Apifera. The group, which plays experimental music, mostly instrumental, influenced by a variety of different musical styles such as: fusion, jazz, electronic music, progressive rock and classical music, was signed that same year in the independent record label based in Los Angeles, "Stones Throw", where it releases its albums.

In November 2023 Hershkovits released his first solo album on the ECM Records, "Call on the Old Wise". The album, recorded in 2022 in Lugano, Switzerland, produced by Manfred Eicher, includes, in addition to his original compositions, arrangements of the jazz standard "Single Petal Of A Rose" by Duke Ellington and the song "Dream Your Dreams" by Molly Drake (Nick Drake's mother). In 2024, the album received the prestigious German Record Critics' Award for "Jazz Album of the Year". And in addition, the album was presented by ECM label for nomination at the prestigious Grammy Award in the "Jazz Album of the Year" category.

== Discography ==
=== Studio albums ===
- I Asked You a Question (Raw Tapes, 2016)
- New Place Always (Enja, 2018)
- Lemon the Moon (Enja, 2019)
- Imajin (Raw Tapes, 2022)
- Call on the Old Wise (ECM Records, 2023)

With Apifera

- Overstand (Stones Throw Records, 2021)
- 6 Visits (Stones Throw Records, 2021)
- Keep The Outside Open (Stones Throw Records, 2024)

With Avishai Cohen

- Avishai Cohen – Duende (EMI/Blue Note Records, 2012)
- Avishai Cohen – Almah (Parlophone/Razdaz, 2013)
- Avishai Cohen – From Darkness (Razdaz, 2015)

=== Co-Leading ===
- Time Grove Ensemble, Nitai Hershkovits and Rejoicer (Raw Tapes, 2021)
- Let The Mountain In, KerenDun and Nitai Hershkovits (Raw Tapes, 2021)
- The Garden Suite, Nitai Hershkovits and Daniel Dor (Raw Tapes, 2024)

=== Featured ===
- Daniel Zamir – One (8th Note, 2009)
- Ilan Salem – Wild (Razdaz, 2011)
- Avi Lebovich Orchestra – Volcano (Indie, 2013)
- Layers – Things on Top of Each Other (Raw Tapes, 2014)
- Daniel Zamir – Redemption Songs (Tzadik, 2015)
- All Original – Best Young Jazz in Israel (Razdaz, 2015)
- Ari Hoenig – Conner's Days (Fresh Sound Records, 2019)
- Oded Tzur – Here Be Dragons (ECM Records, 2020)
- Oded Tzur – Isabela (ECM Records, 2022)
- Oded Tzur - My Prophet (ECM Records, 2024)

=== Compilations ===
- "Flyin' Bamboo (feat. Mndsgn)" – Puzzles, Volume 3 (Raw Tapes, 2018)
