= Unity (Avishai Cohen album) =

Studio album by Avishai Cohen
- Released: 2001
- Recorded: April 2001
- Genre: Jazz
- Label: Stretch
- Producers: Avishai Cohen, Joe Ferla

Professional ratings
Review scores
Source	Rating
The Penguin Guide to Jazz Recordings	3/4 stars

Unity is the fourth studio album by Israeli jazz bassist Avishai Cohen, released in 2001.

The album is credited to the International Vamp Band, consisting of Avi Lebovich and Yagil Baras from Israel, Diego Urcola from Argentina, Antonio Sánchez from Mexico, and Yosvany Terry from Cuba. The album is inspired by all four cultures, and it combines jazz, Latin, classical, and worldbeat. Cohen plays piano rather than his usual bass, which is played by Baras, who appeared on Cohen's album Colors in 2000.

== Track listing ==
All tracks written by Avishai Cohen except where indicated

1. "Short Story" – 6:55
2. "Vamp" – 7:26
3. "Etude" – 7:51
4. "Float" – 6:16
5. "Island Man" – 6:14
6. "Pause" – 1:10
7. "Jazz Condo" – 3:20
8. "Song for My Brother" – 4:25
9. "A Child Is Born" – 7:15 (Thad Jones)
10. "Yagla" – 6:15
11. "To the Love" – 5:36

== Personnel ==
- Avishai Cohen – piano, electric bass, vocals
- Antonio Sánchez – drums, vocals
- Diego Urcola – trumpet, flugelhorn
- Yosvany Terry – alto saxophone, tenor saxophone
- Avi Lebovich – trombone, vocals
- Yagil Baras – upright bass
