= Another Country (Cassandra Wilson album) =

Another Country featuring Fabrizio Sotti

Studio album by Cassandra Wilson, Fabrizio Sotti
- Released: June 20, 2012
- Studios: Piety Street Studios (New Orleans, Louisiana) Sotti Studio (New York City, New York ) Studio Larione 10 (Florence, Italy)
- Genre: Jazz
- Length: 43:58
- Label: eOne Records
- Producers: Cassandra Wilson; Fabrizio Sotti

Cassandra Wilson, Fabrizio Sotti chronology
| Silver Pony (2010) | Another Country featuring Fabrizio Sotti (2012) | Coming Forth by Day (2015) |

Another Country is a studio album by singer Cassandra Wilson, featuring the guitar, songwriting and production of Italian guitarist and producer Fabrizio Sotti. The record was released on June 20, 2012 via eOne Records label.

== Background ==
The album also marks the end of her 20-year contract with Blue Note label. Another Country features a blend of new songs, instrumentals and arrangements that resulted from the collaboration between Sotti and Wilson. The final track, “Olomuroro” also features backup vocals from the New Orleans Center for Creative Arts Chamber Choir.

The album was recorded in Florence, Italy and New Orleans, Louisiana, and was mixed by Piety Street engineer John Fischbach. The album was released by Ojah Media Group and E1 Entertainment.

== Reception ==
Professional ratings
Aggregate scores
| Source | Rating |
|---|---|
| Metacritic | 71/100 |
Review scores
| Source | Rating |
| AllMusic | 3.5/5 stars |
| The Buffalo News | 3/4 stars |
| The Guardian | 3/5 stars |
| Financial Times | 3/5 stars |
| Jazzwise | 4/5 stars |
| laut.de | 3/5 stars |
| Mojo | 3/5 stars |
| PopMatters | 6/10 |
| Tom Hull | B+ |

Thom Jurek of AllMusic stated: "On her 19th album, Cassandra Wilson, ever the musical chameleon, changes directions once more. She is arguably the greatest living female jazz singer. Well known for her blues, soul, pop covers, and jazz standards, her smoky alto bends almost everything to its will. Wilson's phrasing is utterly unique, as original as any horn player's or pianist's music.... Though there are a couple of missteps here, Another Country is a welcome new phase for Wilson. Not only are her boundaries as a singer expanding with her musical choices; her songwriting instincts and languages are developing exponentially as well." The Buffalo News review by Jeff Simon noted, "there is so much to glory on this personal and intimate disc of voice/guitar dialogues that you might as well join the ranks of those who have long since learned that Wilson's career is one that one eavesdrops on, rather than basks in while a performer pursues an incorruptible desire to ingratiate."

Daniel Spicer of BBC wrote: "Another Country is an album that radiates warmth. Not just the warmth of southern seas and skies, but the human warmth that beams directly out of Ms Wilson’s heaving heart." Mikael Wood of Time Out added: "Whatever the flavor or provenance of her material, Wilson summons the shadowed sensuality that has become her artistic trademark. It’s hard to imagine a location in which that voice couldn’t make itself at home."

Nate Chinen of The New York Times commented: "Cassandra Wilson named her new album after one of its strongest tracks, a love song that compares the bloom of a new relationship to the discovery of a new world. Singing in her languorous drawl over a fluttering samba rhythm, she paints a vivid, sensual picture, affectionate and self-contained. The song represents a sigh of romantic fulfillment, but also a small shudder of apprehension."

== Track listing ==
1. "Red Guitar" (Cassandra Wilson) - 4:35
2. "No More Blues" (Wilson, Fabrizio Sotti) - 4:18
3. "O sole mio" (Arranged by Wilson and Sotti) - 5:40
4. "Deep Blue" (Sotti) - 2:29
5. "Almost Twelve" (Wilson, Sotti) - 4:24
6. "Passion" (Wilson, Sotti) - 5:23
7. "When Will I See You Again" (Wilson, Sotti) - 6:27
8. "Another Country" (Wilson, Sotti) - 4:16
9. "Letting You Go" (Sotti) - 3:28
10. "Olomuroro" (Wilson, Sotti, Olalekan Babalola) - 3:09

== Personnel ==
- Cassandra Wilson – vocals (all tracks, except 4, 9), acoustic guitar (1)
- Fabrizio Sotti – electric guitar (1), acoustic guitar (2–10)
- Julien Labro – accordion (exc. 4, 9)
- Nicola Sorato – electric bass (exc. 4, 9)
- Lekan Babalola – percussion (exc. 4, 9)
- Mino Cinelu – percussion (exc. 4, 9)
- New Orleans Center for Creative Arts Chamber Choir – choir (10)

=== Production ===
- Cassandra Wilson and Fabrizio Sotti – producers
- John Fischbach – engineer, mixing, mastering
- Max Bacchin – engineer
- Giorgio Piovan, Simone “Keemo” Tonsi – additional recording
- Wesley Fontenot – mixing, assistant engineer
- Francesco Baldi – assistant engineer
- Paul Grosso – creative director
- Sean Marlowe – art direction, design
- Marco Glaviano – cover photography
- Thabi Moyo – location photography and filming
- Cristinne De La Susse – stylist
- Yo Nakagawa – liner notes

== Charts ==
| Chart (2012) | Peak position |
|---|---|
| German Albums (Offizielle Top 100) | 64 |
| US Top Current Albums (Billboard) | 171 |
| US Heatseekers Albums (Billboard) | 6 |
| US Independent Albums (Billboard) | 35 |
| US Top Jazz Albums (Billboard) | 2 |
