= Jesse Palter =

American musician

Jesse Palter is an American singer-songwriter and recording artist. Palter's work ranges from pop to jazz. She released her debut album, Paper Trail, on Mack Avenue Music Group July 19, 2019.

== Early life and education ==
Palter was born in Detroit, Michigan to a musical family, and raised in the suburb of West Bloomfield. Palter began performing in musical theater at age 5 and in jazz band during high school where she played the trumpet and oboe. Palter attended a middle school that specialized in the performing arts, where she began to write music. Palter attended The University of Michigan in Ann Arbor as a Jazz & Contemplative Studies Major.

== Career ==
Palter began singing at a young age, performing in theater productions as a middle-school student. At age 13, Palter began to write her own music and was connected with singer/songwriter/producer Andrew Gold. Palter went to Nashville to work with Gold and created a demo. Around age 15, she began working with the production duo the Bass Brothers, known primarily for their work with Eminem.

She has performed in Detroit area clubs including The Firefly Jazz Club in Ann Arbor (now defunct), and Baker's Keyboard Lounge and Cliff Bell's, both in Detroit.

In 2009 Palter co-founded, along with pianist Sam Barsh, the electronic pop group Jesse Palter and the Alter Ego, later renamed Palter Ego. The group has released two EPs and two albums.

Palter relocated to Los Angeles in 2010 to further pursue her career as a writer and performer.

On October 19, 2018, Palter released a five song ep on the Artistry Music division of Mack Avenue Records. The songs are autobiographical. In early 2019, Artistry Music followed The Paper Trail EP with the single "Sever The Ties" and a full-length debut album.

"Paper Trail" was named LA Weekly Album Of The Week. On October 2, 2020, Palter independently released her single "Better Days", written and self-produced in quarantine. In 2022, her album Nothing Standard was released.

Palter is a mental health advocate and ally, and has penned pieces published in Thrive Global, Grammy.com and has spoken on panels for the Recording Academy on music and mental wellness.

== Awards and nominations ==
- Palter has been nominated for nine Detroit Music Awards, of which she has won six. She won the Outstanding Jazz Vocalist category in 2006, 2008 and 2009, where she was named a Special Honoree. Palter also received three nominations at the 2011 awards.
- She was selected as one of Music Connections Hot 100 Live Unsigned Artists and Bands of 2020.
