= Coming Forth by Day (album) =

Studio album by Cassandra Wilson
- Released: April 6, 2015
- Recorded: Summer 2014
- Studios: Seedy Underbelly Studios (Valley Village, California)
- Genre: Jazz
- Length: 58:12
- Label: Legacy Recordings
- Producer: Nick Launay

Cassandra Wilson chronology
Another Country (2012)	Coming Forth by Day (2015)

Coming Forth by Day is the sixteenth and final studio album by American jazz singer Cassandra Wilson. The album was released on April 6, 2015 via Legacy Recordings label.

== Background ==
The album is an homage to legendary jazz vocalist Billie Holiday to commemorate the 100th anniversary of the singer's birth. The album includes 11 cover versions of famous jazz standards associated with Holiday and an original composition written by Cassandra Wilson—"Last Song (For Lester)"—imagined to be a heartbreaking final message from Holiday to her musical love, Lester Young. Wilson explained: "Coming Forth by Day is a homage dedicated to the beauty, power, and genius of Billie Holiday. A collection of musical spells, prescriptions for navigating the dubious myths surrounding her life and times, this record is a vehicle for the re-emergence of Billie’s songbook in the 21st century."

== Reception ==
Professional ratings
Review scores
Source	Rating
All About Jazz	5/5 stars
AllMusic	4/5 stars
Elmore Magazine	86/100
Exclaim!	8/10
The Guardian	4/5 stars
Jazz Forum	4/5 stars
Jazzwise	4/5 stars
Laut.de	4/5 stars
The Sydney Morning Herald	4/5 stars
Tom Hull	B+

Stephen Thomas Erlewine of AllMusic stated, "Perhaps the pairing of Cassandra Wilson and Billie Holiday carries a whiff of inevitability, but there's nothing predictable about Coming Forth by Day. Released to coincide with Holiday's centennial in 2015, Coming Forth by Day explicitly celebrates Lady Day by drawing upon standards she sang in addition to songs she wrote, but Wilson deliberately sidesteps the conventional by hiring Nick Launay as a producer. As a result of his work with Nick Cave, Launay mastered a certain brand of spooky Americana, something that comes in handy with the Holiday catalog, but Coming Forth by Day is never too thick with murk. It luxuriates in its atmosphere, sometimes sliding into a groove suggesting smooth '70s soul, often handsomely evoking a cinematic torch song -- moods that complement each other and suggest Holiday's work without replicating it. This is a neat trick: such flexibility suggests how adaptable Holiday's songbook is while underscoring the imagination behind Wilson's interpretations. Certainly, Launay deserves credit for his painterly production, but the success of Coming Forth by Day belongs entirely to Wilson, who proves that she's an heir to Holiday's throne by never once imitating her idol."

Christopher Loudon of JazzTimes wrote, "Though it’s disheartening to realize that even an artist as eminent as Cassandra Wilson had to turn to PledgeMusic to fund her centenary salute to Billie Holiday, it’s best to set aside such state-of-things ponderings and focus on the outcome. Which is, in a word, exquisite. It’s also clever, insightful and, though utterly respectful to Holiday as source and touchstone, strikingly original." Writing for DownBeat, Bobby Reed commented, "This disc, which includes 11 songs recorded by Billie Holiday, functions as an admirable tribute, but it doesn’t sound like Lady Day. Wilson employs her own husky, occasionally hushed singing style, not attempting to re-create Holiday’s famous vocal inflections—and certainly not copying her arrangements. Instead, Wilson assembled a stellar, “outside the box” ensemble to interpret this material for a new generation of listeners."

John Fordham of The Guardian noted, "Singer Jose James’ recent tribute to Billie Holiday saw a fine singer and a hip jazz trio sprinkling personal magic on timeless songs with careful respect. Cassandra Wilson’s angle on Holiday is very different: a radical, big-production remake of the great vocalist’s music with the rhythm section from Nick Cave's Bad Seeds giving the repertoire a thick-textured, abstract blues-rock feel, while a luxurious strings section embraces the ballads." In his review for the Santa Barbara Independent, Charles Donelan wrote, "The album reveals yet another aspect of this visionary artist’s immense talent, as Wilson ventures into the orchestral territory mapped out by Arcade Fire, with her sainted muse Billie Holiday by her side."

== Track listing ==
No.	Title	Writer(s)	Length
1.	"Don't Explain"	Arthur Herzog, Jr., Billie Holiday	4:35
2.	"Billie's Blues"	Billie Holiday	5:08
3.	"Crazy He Calls Me"	Carl Sigman, Sidney Keith Russell	6:19
4.	"You Go to My Head"	Haven Gillespie, J. Fred Coots	4:10
5.	"All of Me"	Gerald Marks, Seymour Simons	4:07
6.	"The Way You Look Tonight"	Dorothy Fields, Jerome Kern	3:51
7.	"Good Morning Heartache"	Dan Fisher, Ervin Drake, Irene Higginbotham	4:57
8.	"What a Little Moonlight Can Do"	Harry M. Woods	4:10
9.	"These Foolish Things"	Eric Maschwitz, Jack Strachey	4:14
10.	"Strange Fruit"	Lewis Allan	4:55
11.	"I'll Be Seeing You"	Irving Kahal, Sammy Fain	6:10
12.	"Last Song (For Lester)"	Cassandra Wilson, Jon Cowherd, Kevin Breit, Martyn Casey, Robby Marshall, Thomas Wydler	5:51
Total length:			58:12

== Personnel ==
- Cassandra Wilson – vocals, lead guitar on outro (10)
- Robby Marshall – saxophone (1), bass clarinet (2, 3, 5, 6, 8), clarinet (2, 7, 10), flute (4), melodica (5), baritone saxophone (7, 10), tenor saxophone (9, 12)
- Jon Cowherd – acoustic piano (except 2, 6), Rhodes electric piano (2, 9, 12), organ (6, 10), echoes (11)
- Kevin Breit – guitars (1–5, 7–9, 12), acoustic guitar (2, 12), banjo (2, 6), loops (2, 3), atmospheric loops (5, 6, 8–10, 12), tape loops (7), guitar chimes (10), atmospheric guitar (11)
- Ming Vauze – guitar string effects (1), atmospheric guitar loops (10)
- T Bone Burnett – baritone guitar (2, 4, 7)
- Nick Zinner – additional guitars (4), atmospheric loops (8, 9), guitars (10), guitar loops (10, 12)
- Martyn P. Casey – bass
- Thomas Wydler – drums, percussion (except 6, 8, 11), echoes (11)
- Paul Cantelon – accordion (5)
- The Section Quartet (3–5, 8 & 10)
  - Eric Gorfain - violin, string arrangements, notes extended (4), violin with echoes (11)
  - Daphne Chen - violin
  - Lauren Chipman - viola
  - Richard Dodd - cello
- Van Dyke Parks Orchestra – strings (4, 6)
  - Van Dyke Parks - string arrangements, conductor

== Production ==
- Nick Launay – producer, recording, mixing, liner notes
- Ed Gerrard – co-producer, management
- Atom Greenspan – recording, production assistant
- Bernie Grundman – mastering at Bernie Grundman Mastering (Hollywood, California)
- Sherry Beth Mounce – project coordinator
- Frank Harkins – art direction, design
- Mark Seliger – photography
- Frank Himberger – management
- Impact Artist Management – management company

== Charts ==
Chart performance for Coming Forth by Day
Chart (2015)	Peak position
Belgian Albums (Ultratop Flanders)	7
Belgian Albums (Ultratop Wallonia)	3
French Albums (SNEP)	91
German Albums (Offizielle Top 100)	56
Dutch Albums (Album Top 100)	94
Spanish Albums (Promusicae)	97
Swiss Albums (Schweizer Hitparade)	96
US Top Jazz Albums (Billboard)	1
