= Lyla (album) =

Lyla is an album by jazz bassist Avishai Cohen, released in 2003.

Professional ratings
Review scores
Source	Rating
The Penguin Guide to Jazz Recordings	3/4 stars

== Track listing ==
No.	Title	Length
1.	"Ascension"	3:31
2.	"Lyla"	4:58
3.	"How Long"	4:34
4.	"Watcher" (a cover of the Dr. Dre song from 2001)	3:22
5.	"Evolving Etude"	3:49
6.	"Structure in Emotion"	4:19
7.	"Handsonit"	6:40
8.	"Come Together" (a cover of the song by The Beatles from Abbey Road)	4:02
9.	"How Long (Reflected)"	3:26
10.	"Eternal Child" (written by Chick Corea)	4:16
11.	"Simple Melody"	3:12
