= Right Now (Fabrizio Sotti album) =

Studio album by Fabrizio Sotti
- Released: May 14, 2013
- Studio: Sotti Studios
- Label: Red River
- Producer: Fabrizio Sotti

Right Now is a 2013 studio album released by Italian-American Jazz guitarist Fabrizio Sotti. The album is notable for its blending of Sotti's backgrounds as a jazz musician, hip-hop producer, and pop songwriter across collaborations with Shaggy, Ice-T, Tony Grey, Mino Cinelu, Zucchero, Melanie Fiona, Isabella Lundgren, M1 of Dead Prez, and more.

The album was recorded at Fabrizio's Sotti Studios in NYC and mixed at Piety Studios in New Orleans by legendary engineer John Fishback, while Sotti produced and arranged all of the songs on the album.

Right Now was inspired by Sotti's diverse musical background, and a range of his musical inspirations. The album features reinterpretations of Pink Floyd's "The Wall," Jimi Hendrix's “The Wind Cries Mary,” and Bob Marley's “Waitin’ in Vain” alongside Sotti's own songs and compositions.

== Credits ==
Fabrizio Sotti: Electric Guitar, Acoustic Guitar, Classical Guitar
Tony Grey: Bass
Mino Cinelu: Drums, Percussion, Vocals on “Paradis”
Isabella Lundgren – Vocals on “One”
Shaggy – Vocals on “Waitin’ in Vain”
Res – Vocals on “Waitin’ in Vain,” The Wall
Zucchero – Vocals on “Someone Else’s Tears”
Ice-T – Vocals on “The Wall”
M1 – Vocals on “The Wall”
Melanie Fiona – Vocals on “The Wind Cries Mary”
Claudia Acuna – Vocals on “Fidjo Maguado”
Algebra Blessett – Vocals on “Fall With Me”
Isabella Lundgren – Vocals on “Once in a Bluemoon”

Produced by Fabrizio Sotti
Mixed by John Fishback
Mastered by Alan Silverman
Engineers: John Fishback, Simone “Keemo” Tonsi and Fabrizio Sotti

== Track listing ==
1. One (featuring Isabella Lundgren) – Written by U2
2. Waitin in Vain (featuring Shaggy and Res) – Written by Bob Marley
3. Paradis (featuring Mino Cinelu) – Written by Sotti/ Cinelu
4. Someone Else's Tears (featuring Zucchero) – Written by Zucchero/Bono
5. The Wall (featuring Ice-T, Res, and M1 of Dead Prez) – Written by Roger Waters
6. The Wind Cries Mary (featuring Melanie Fiona) – Written by Jimi Hendrix
7. Prancing Horse – Written by Fabrizio Sotti
8. Right Now – Written by Fabrizio Sotti
9. Fidjo Maguado (featuring Claudia Acuna) – Written by Jorge Monteiro
10. Fall With Me (featuring Algebra Blesset) – Written by Sotti/Blessett
11. Once in a Bluemoon (featuring Isabella Lundgren) – Written by Fabrizio Sotti
12. While the Sun is Rising – written by Fabrizio Sotti
