= Continuo (album) =

Studio album by Avishai Cohen
- Released: May 23, 2006
- Recorded: December 10–17, 2005
- Genre: Ethno jazz
- Label: Sunnyside Records

Professional ratings
Review scores
Source	Rating
Allmusic	4/5 stars
The Penguin Guide to Jazz Recordings	2.5/4 stars

Continuo is a studio album by jazz bassist Avishai Cohen, released in May 2006.

== Track listing ==
All tracks are written by Avishai Cohen.

No.	Title	Length
1.	"Nu Nu"	5:14
2.	"Elli"	3:57
3.	"One for Mark"	4:58
4.	"Ani Maamin" (cover of a poem written by Shaul Tchernichovsky and composed by Tuvia Shlonsky)	5:15
5.	"Samuel"	5:16
6.	"Emotional Storm"	7:30
7.	"Calm"	3:16
8.	"Arava"	5:20
9.	"Smash"	5:31
10.	"Continuo"	4:11

== Personnel ==
- Avishai Cohen – bass, electric bass, acoustic bass, handclapping, arrangement
- Sam Barsh – piano, keyboards, handclapping
- Mark Guiliana – percussion, drums, handclapping
- Amos Hoffman – oud, handclapping
- Ray Jefford – production
- Daniel Kedem – photography
