= Avishai Cohen (bassist) =

Israeli jazz bassist (born 1970)

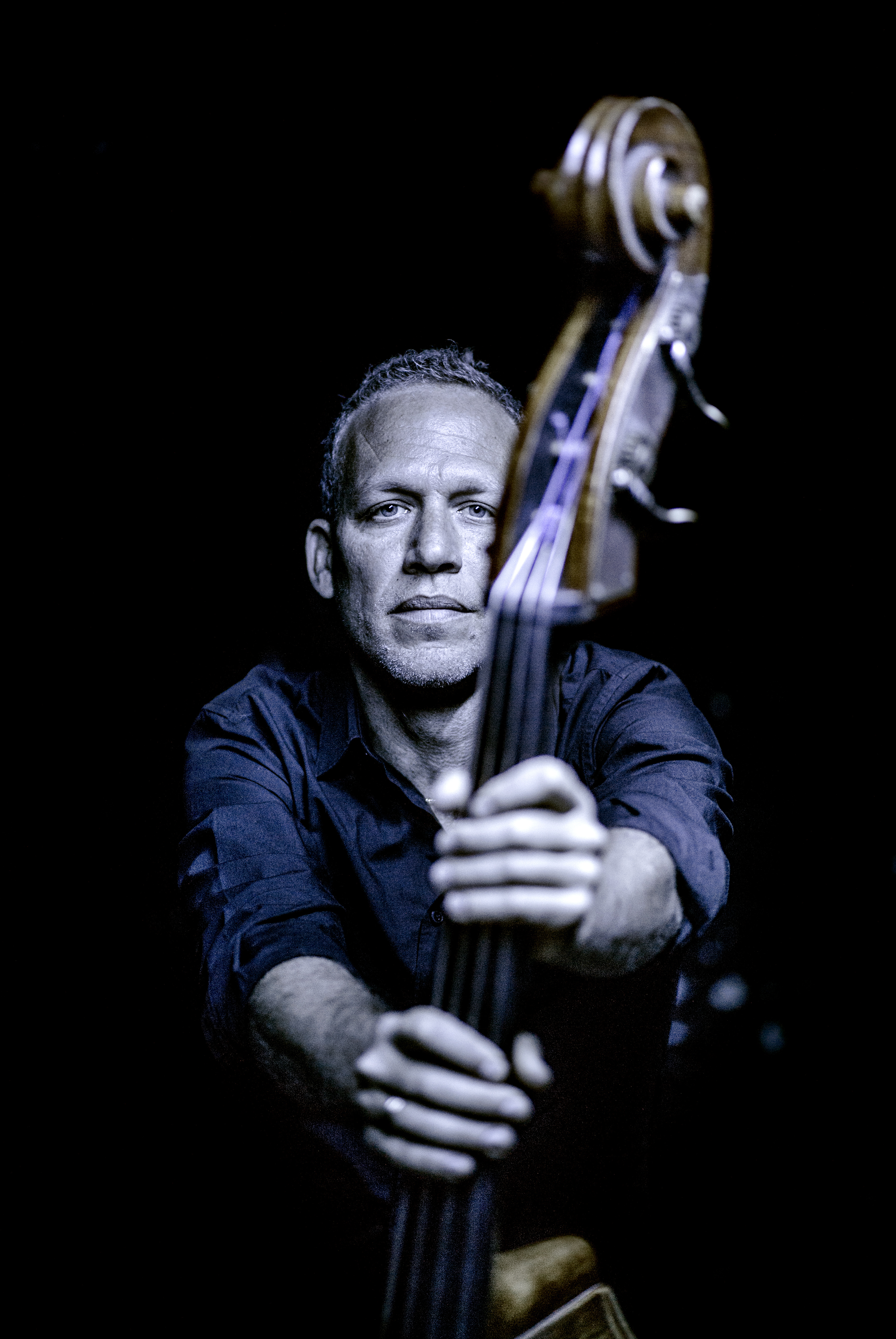
- Cohen in 2015

Background information
- Born: April 20, 1970 (age 56); Kibbutz Kabri, Israel
- Genres: Jazz, ethno jazz, folk jazz, jazz fusion
- Occupation: Musician
- Instruments: Bass, vocals
- Years active: 1993–present
- Labels: Razdaz, Stretch, Blue Note
- Website: avishaicohen.com

Avishai Cohen (Hebrew: אבישי כהן; born April 20, 1970) is an Israeli jazz double bassist, composer, singer, and arranger.

== Early life ==
Avishai Cohen was born in Kabri, a kibbutz in northern Israel. He has Sephardic, Greek-Jewish, and Polish-Jewish ancestry. He grew up in a musical family at Motza and Beit Zayit near Jerusalem until the age of six, when his family moved to nearby Shoeva. He began playing the piano at 9 years old but changed to the bass guitar at the age of 14, inspired by bassist Jaco Pastorius, whose music was introduced to him by a music teacher in St Louis, Missouri, where he had moved with his family as a teenager. When his family moved back to Israel, he joined the Music and Arts Academy in Jerusalem with a focus on acoustic bass.

== Musical career ==
At age 22, after having served for two years in an army band, Cohen moved to New York City, where he initially performed on the streets while working in construction. While studying at the New School in Greenwich Village, he joined the trio of Panamanian pianist Danilo Pérez. The group recorded PanaMonk, a tribute album to Thelonious Monk with Latin touches, which led Cohen to experiment with Latin sounds. In 1996, he became a founding member of Chick Corea's Origin sextet, and in 1997, he joined Corea's New Trio. During the six years of musical collaboration with Corea, Cohen fine-tuned his skills as a performer and composer.

Cohen's first four albums, Adama (1998), Devotion (1999), Colors (2000), and Unity (2001), were released under Corea's Stretch Records label and featured Mediterranean and Latin influences as well as the use of horns and vocals. Unity was recorded with the International Vamp Band, a group formed by Cohen involving fellow musicians from different parts of the world—Mexico, Argentina, Cuba, and Israel. The project's aim was to allow different cultures to interact and converse through the medium of music. Cohen also helped Chilean singer Claudia Acuña create her first album, Wind From The South (2000).

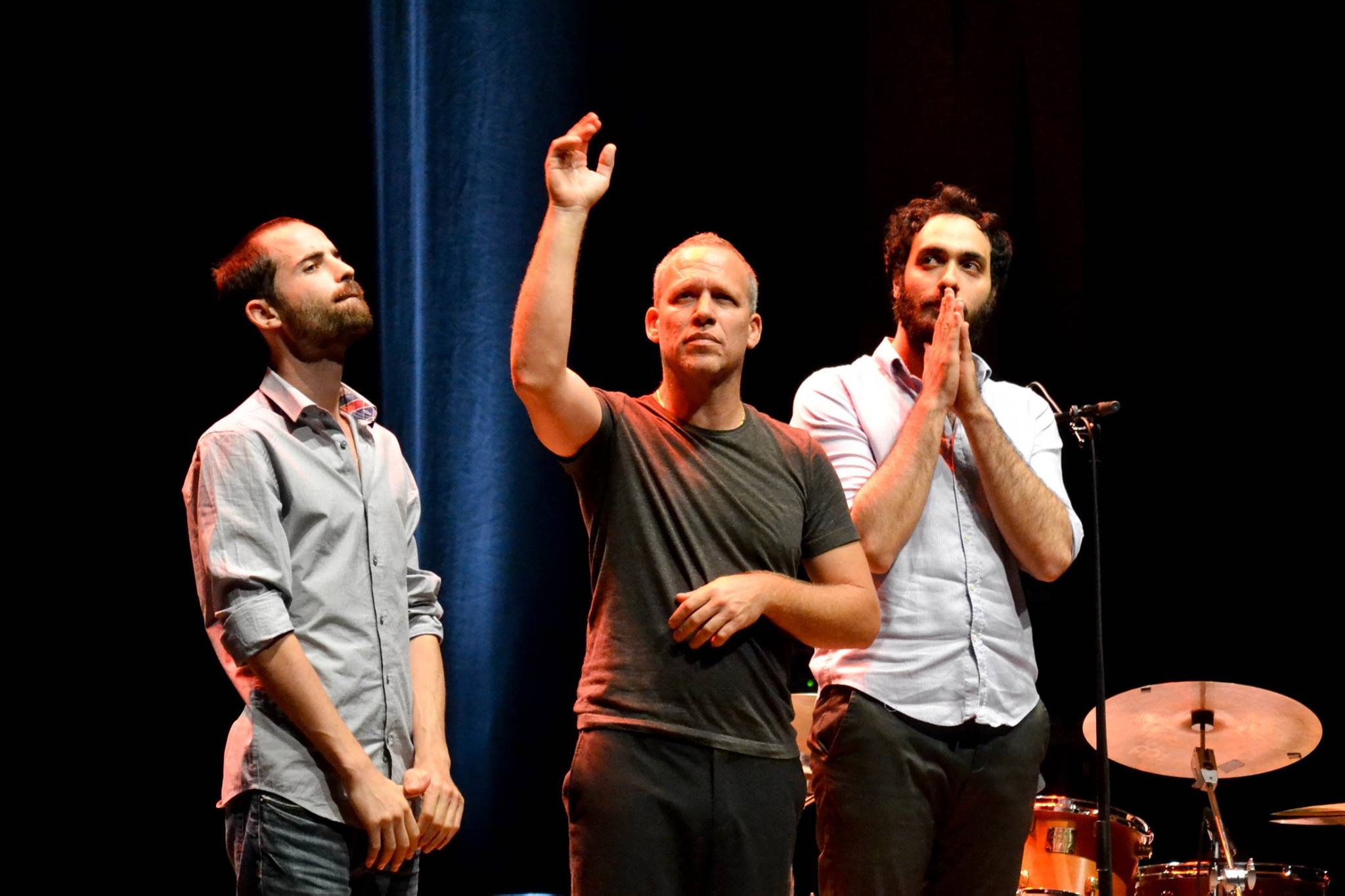
Avishai Cohen Trio in Uppsala, 2015

In 2002, Cohen founded his own record label, Razdaz Recordz. He explained, "I've always been interested in several genres of music, including jazz, rock, pop, Latin and funk. [...] I'm always packed with ideas. I decided to start my own label because I'm involved in so many different projects." Lyla was the first album released by Razdaz. Cohen reflected on his work: "Lyla reflects much of who I am as an artist. The International Vamp Band has been touring for two years and I wanted to document that. I also started a rock band Gadu with U.S. drummer named Mark Guiliana. [...] I've also been working on pop tunes with a female vocalist named Lola. And, of course, to show the whole picture on the CD, I wanted to acknowledge my relationship to Chick."

In 2005, he released the album At Home, featuring the composition "Remembering".

The cosmopolitan album Continuo (2006) followed. In 2007, the live recording As Is, Live at the Blue Note marked his return to New York for a series of live concerts at the Blue Note Jazz Club.

Gently Disturbed (Razdaz Recordz, 2008) was a trio album featuring Mark Guiliana on drums and Shai Maestro on piano.

Following his years-long stay in New York City, Cohen moved back to Israel and released Sha'ot Regishot (2008) (transl. 'Sensitive Hours'), which attained gold sales status in Israel. It was the first album to introduce vocals in all its compositions as well as songs in Hebrew.

With Aurora in 2009, Cohen blended jazz, classical music, and Sephardic traditions, while further exploring his abilities as a singer.

In 2011, Cohen released Seven Seas (EMI/Blue Note).

In 2012, he released the duo album Duende (Emi/Blue Note) with Israeli pianist Nitai Hershkovits. For his performance in Duende, he won the 2013 Echo Jazz Award for International Bass Instrumentalist of the Year.

The release of Almah (Warner/Parlophone, 2013) combined his trio with a string quartet, incorporating classical music elements for the first time in his career.

2015 saw the release of the trio album From Darkness (Razdaz Recordz), featuring Nitai Hershkovits on piano and Daniel Dor on drums.

In 2016, he presented “An Evening with Avishai Cohen”, a project featuring a core trio, with the integration of full orchestra, for which he collaborated with over 25 orchestras including the Gothenburg Symphony Orchestra, the Malmö Symphony Orchestra, Luxembourg Philharmonic, Brussels Philharmonic, the BBC Concert Orchestra, Philharmonic Orchestra Essen, Brno Philharmonic, Lviv Philharmonic, and the Philharmonie de Paris.

In 2017, Cohen released the album 1970 (Sony), in which he explored a more accessible, pop-rock sound as well as his vocal expression.

In 2019, he returned to a trio configuration with the album Arvoles (Razdaz Recordz), featuring Noam David on drums and Elchin Shirinov on piano.

In 2020, he announced that he was joining French label Naïve Records (Believe Digital) as an exclusive recording artist.

In 2021, Cohen released the album Two Roses (Naïve Records/Believe Digital) with his trio of Mark Guiliana on drums and Elchin Shirinov on piano, with the Gothenburg Symphony Orchestra conducted by Alexander Hanson.

== Style ==
Cohen's sound is a blend of Middle Eastern, eastern European, and African-American musical idioms. His compositions embrace a blend of traditions, cultures, languages and styles, from Hebrew and Ladino folk songs, jazz standards, to contemporary jazz. The New York Times describes his 2006 album Continuo as conjoining "heavy Middle Eastern groove with a delicate, almost New Age lyricism". Cohen often sings in Judaeo-Spanish (Ladino), to which he has a connection through his mother. For example, "Morenika", from his album Aurora, is a popular Ladino song he grew up hearing his mother sing around the house. Over the years, Cohen has been creating and performing more music and arrangements associated with classical music, combining composed music and the freedom of jazz within his musical statement.

== Discography ==
=== As leader/co-leader ===
Album title	Year recorded	Label	Year released	Peak positions		
Album title	Year recorded	Label	Year released	BEL (FL)	FR	SWE
Adama	1997	Stretch	1998	—	—	—
Devotion		Stretch	1999	—	—	—
Colors		Stretch	2000	—	—	—
Unity	2001	Stretch	2001	—	—	—
Lyla	2003	Sunnyside	2003	—	—	—
At Home (as Avishai Cohen Trio)	2004	Sunnyside	2005	—	—	—
Continuo	2005	Sunnyside	2006	—	—	—
As Is...Live at the Blue Note	2006	Half Note	2007	—	—	—
Sha'ot Regishot (in English: 'Sensitive hours')		Razdaz	2008	—	—	—
Night of Magic (as Avishai Cohen Trio)	2007	Jazz In Kiev	2008	—	—	—
Gently Disturbed (as Avishai Cohen Trio)	2007	Razdaz	2008	—	127	—
Aurora	2008	Blue Note	2009	—	71	—
Seven Seas	2010	Blue Note	2011	—	58	31
Duende with Nitai Hershkovits	2012	Blue Note	2012	79	63	—
Almah		Parlophone	2013	—	85	—
From Darkness (as Avishai Cohen Trio)	2014	Razdaz	2015	—	—	—
1970		Sony Music	2017	166	102	—
Arvoles	2019	Razdaz	2019	—	—	—
Two Roses with Gothenburg Symphony Orchestra	2020	Naïve	2021	—	—	—
Shifting Sands (as Avishai Cohen Trio)	2021	Naïve	2022	135	—	—
Iroko with Abraham Rodriguez Jr.		Naïve	2023			
Brightlight	2024	Naïve	2024			

=== As sideman ===
With Chick Corea

- Origin (sextet), A Week at the Blue Note (Stretch, 1998)[6CD] – live recorded in 1997
- Origin, Live at the Blue Note (Stretch, 1998) – live recorded in 1997
- Origin, Change (Stretch, 1999)
- New Trio, Past, Present & Futures (Stretch, 2001)

With Amos Hoffman

- The Dreamer (Fresh Sound, 1999)
- Evolution (Sunnyside, 2008)

With others

- Gary Barlow, Music Played by Humans (Polydor, 2020)
- Seamus Blake Trio, Sun Sol (Fresh Sound, 2000) – recorded in 1999
- Omri Mor, It's About Time! (Naïve, 2018) – recorded in 2013–2016
- Danilo Pérez, PanaMonk (Impulse!, 1996)
- Kurt Rosenwinkel Trio, East Coast Love Affair (Fresh Sound, 1996) – live
- Edward Simon, Simplicitas (Criss Cross, 2005) – recorded in 2004
