= Fabrizio Sotti =

Italian guitarist, composer, and songwriter

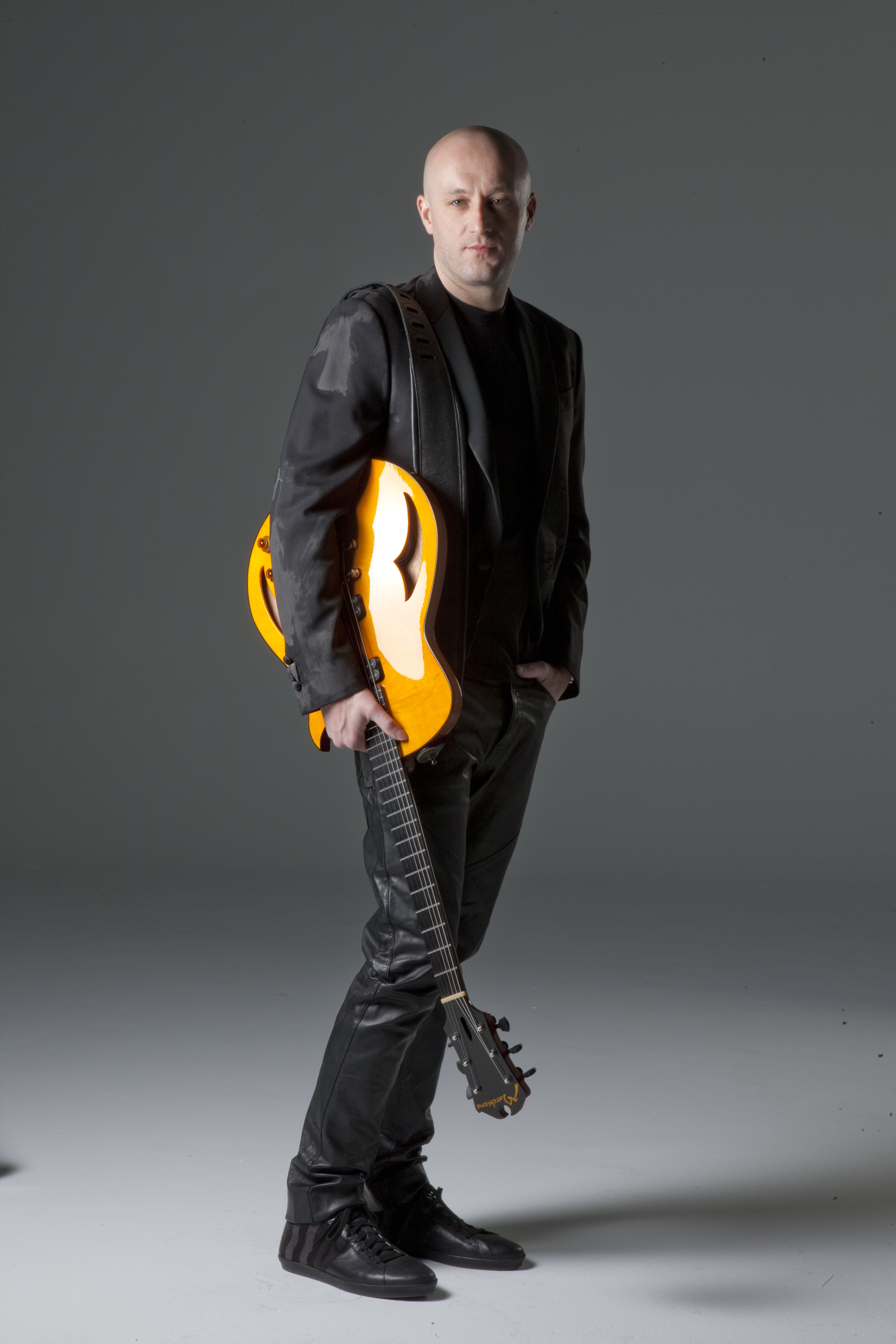

Background information
- Born: April 27, 1975; Padova, Italy
- Genres: Jazz, jazz fusion, hip hop, R&B, pop
- Occupations: Musician, composer, record producer
- Instrument: Guitar
- Years active: 1991–present
- Labels: Universal, Motown, Blue Note, BMG, E1, Roc Nation, Sotti Entertainment, Incipit, Egea
- Website: www.fabriziosotti.com

Fabrizio Sotti (born April 27, 1975, in Padova, Italy) is a guitarist, composer, producer and songwriter. In addition to jazz, Sotti plays in the styles of bebop, jazz fusion, soul, hip hop, R&B and pop. He has worked with the likes of Cassandra Wilson, Al Foster, Randy Brecker, John Patitucci, George Garzone, Mino Cinelu, Roy Hargrove, Claudia Acuña, Shaggy, Melanie Fiona, Algebra, Half Pint, Foxy Brown, Jennifer Lopez, Ice-T, Ghostface Killah, Tupac, Q-Tip, K'naan, M-1, Dead Prez, Hell Razah, Paolo Fresu, Zucchero, Mondo Marcio, Mina, Clementino, Frankie Hi-NRG MC, Serena Brancale among many others.

== Equipment ==
Sotti endorses D'Angelico Guitars. His 2015 Fabrizio Sotti Signature Model, the EX-SS/FS, is based on the EX-SS with the addition of Seymour Duncan pick ups (SH2 and SH4), Sperzel machine heads, jumbo frets and reduced wood block for maximum resonance of the hollow body. In 2018 D'Angelico Guitars introduced the Fabrizio Sotti SS Deluxe Signature Model. In 2019 D'Angelico Guitars added the Fabrizio Sotti SS Premier Model.

== Discography ==
=== As leader ===
- Looking For 1993
- Standards and More, feat. Ares Tavolazzi and Mauro Beggio (1995)
- This World Upside Down (Eclipse/Warner Bros. 1999)
- Through My Eyes (Sotti Entertainment/Raitrade, 2004)
- Inner Dance (Sotti /E1, 2010)
- Right Now (Sotti Entertainment, 2013)
- A Few Possibilities (Sotti Entertainment/Incipit, 2014)
- Forty (Sotti Entertainment/Incipit, 2016)

=== As producer, guitarist and songwriter ===
- Lathun, "Fortunate" on Fortunate (Universal/Motown, 2002)
- Cassandra Wilson, Glamoured (BlueNote, 2003)
- Kyrsten, "Talk to Me" on So in Love (Sotti/Raitrade, 2003)
  - "Move with Me" featuring Foxy Brown (single, Sotti, 2003)
- Half Pint, Wha Ya wan (Sotti, 2004)
- Tupac, "If I Fail" featuring Dead Prez on The Rose, Vol. 2 (Koch, 2005)
- M1 of Dead Prez, "One Side (The Anthem)" on Confidential (Sotti/Koch, 2006)
- Hell Razah, "Yours Truly" on Renaissance Child (Nature Sounds, 2007)
- K'naan, "Til We Get There" featuring M1 and Stori James on The Dusty Foot Philosopher (BMG, 2008)
- Cassandra Wilson, Another Country (E1, 2012)
- Tony Grey, "Someday My Prince Will Come" on Elevation (Abstract Logix, 2013)
- Alberto Pizzo, "Voce 'e Notte" on On the Way (Bixio/Egea, 2014)
- Francesco Lomagistro & Berardi Jazz Connection, "A New Journey" (Jazz Engine 2014)
- Nicola Sorato & Giuseppe Sorato, "Reset the World" (Sorato N&G 2014)
- Clementino, "La Cosa Piu' Bella Che Ho" (Universal 2017)
- Mr.Paradise, "Forastero" (Roc Nation 2017)
- Alessandra Salerno, "Faith Within Your Hands" (Sotti Entertainment 2018)
- Mondo Marcio, "Angeli e Demoni" featuring Mina on Uomo! (La Mondo/Sony 2019)
  - "Il Mio Riflesso" (La Mondo Records/Sony 2021)
- Loris Al Raimondi, "Delicate Passion" (2020)
  - "It's a Daughter" (2021)
- Pino Daniele tribute with Rachel Z and Omar Hakim, "Yes I Know My Way" featuring Frankie Hi-Nrg (Incipit, 2021)
  - "Quando" featuring Serena Brancale (Incipit, 2021)
  - "O Scarrafone" featuring Paolo Fresu (Incipit, 2022)
