= Corn Exchange, Newark-on-Trent =

Commercial building in Newark-on-Trent, Nottinghamshire, England

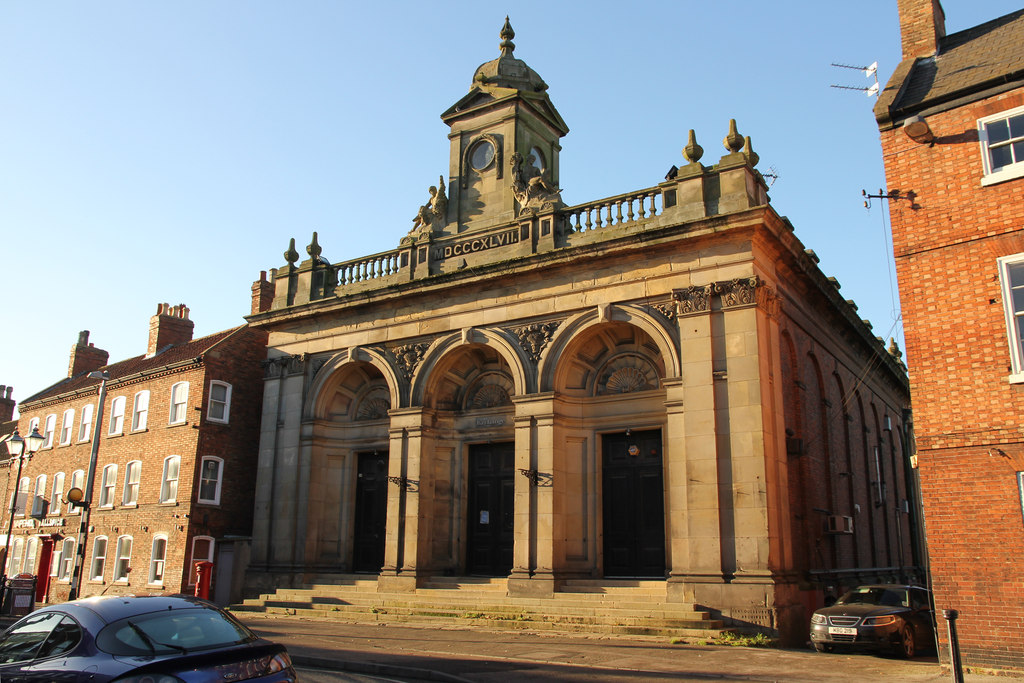
- Corn Exchange, Newark-on-Trent

- Shown in Nottinghamshire
- 53.0767°N 0.8130°W
- Location: Castle Gate, Newark-on-Trent

History
- Built: 1847

Site notes
- Architect: Henry Duesbury
- Architectural style: Italianate style

Listed Building – Grade II
- Official name: Former Corn Exchange, now Silverline Bingo
- Designated: 19 May 1971
- Reference no.: 1196050

The Corn Exchange is a commercial building in Castle Gate, Newark-on-Trent, Nottinghamshire, England. The structure, which is currently used as a nightclub, is a Grade II listed building.

== History ==
In the mid-19th century, a group of local businessmen decided to form a company, to be known as the "Newark Corn Exchange Company", to finance and commission a corn exchange for the town. The site they selected was on the north side of Castle Gate. The building was designed by Henry Duesbury in the Italianate style, built in ashlar stone at a cost of £7,100 and was officially opened on 27 September 1848.

The design involved a symmetrical main frontage of three bays facing onto Castle Gate. The main frontage featured a wide set of steps leading up to three round-headed alcoves, each containing a doorway surmounted by a fanlight-shaped carving and a series of coffered panels, and flanked by short Doric order pilasters supporting architraves with keystones. At the corners of the building, there were pairs of full-height Corinthian order pilasters supporting an entablature, a cornice and a balustraded parapet. At roof level, there was a central date stone and a square tower, which was flanked by statues sculpted by John Bell depicting agriculture and commerce, and which was surmounted by a octagonal dome and finial. Internally, the principal room was the main hall which was 83 feet (25 m) long and 52 feet (16 m) wide, and featured galleries at both ends.

The use of the building as a corn exchange declined significantly in the wake of the Great Depression of British Agriculture in the late 19th century. Instead, it was re-purposed as a public events venue for lectures, exhibitions and concerts. In the years before the First World War, it also operated as a cinema showing silent films, and, during the Second World War, performers included the comedian, Cardew Robinson.

The building later served as a bingo hall, operated by Silverline, from 1971 to 1993, and then as a nightclub, known as Caesar's Palace, from 1994 to 2011. After remaining vacant and deteriorating, the building featured in the book, "Revive and Survive: Buildings at Risk Catalogue 2018-2019", published by Save Britain's Heritage in June 2018. In April 2023, after Newark and Sherwood District Council approved a new premises licence, the owner initiated a major programme of refurbishment works, to enable the nightclub to re-open under the brand "Club X" in summer 2023.

== See also ==
- Corn exchanges in England
- Listed buildings in Newark-on-Trent
