= Listed buildings in Newark-on-Trent =

Newark-on-Trent is a market town, an inland port and a civil parish in the Newark and Sherwood district of Nottinghamshire, England. The town and parish contain over 360 listed buildings that are recorded in the National Heritage List for England. Of these, four are listed at Grade I, the highest of the three grades, eleven are at Grade II*, the middle grade, and the others are at Grade II, the lowest grade. The history of the town is reflected in its buildings, from the remains of the 12th-century castle, through a number of surviving timber framed buildings, to the many Georgian buildings of the 18th century. In the 15th and 16th centuries, wool merchants thrived in the town, followed by drapers, mercers and cloth merchants. By the 18th century, the town was an important staging post on the Great North Road. The town is on the River Trent, which was partly canalised in the late 18th century, encouraging industries including malting, brewing and engineering.

Most of the listed buildings are houses and associated structures, shops and offices. To the north of the town, the Great North Road is carried on a causeway including listed arches, culverts and a viaduct. The other listed buildings include the remains of the castle, churches and chapels, public houses and hotels, a market cross, schools, warehouses, civic buildings, bridges, former maltings, breweries, a water pump and trough, cemetery buildings, railway buildings, banks, a drinking fountain, a war memorial and telephone kiosks.

== Key ==
Grade	Criteria
I	Buildings of exceptional interest, sometimes considered to be internationally important
II*	Particularly important buildings of more than special interest
II	Buildings of national importance and special interest

== Buildings ==
Name and location	Photograph	Date	Notes	Grade
Newark Castle remains 53.07771°N 0.81277°W		c. 1135–39	The castle, at one time a residence, is now a ruin. The earlier parts are in limestone, and some of the later parts are in sandstone. The castle has a quadrangular plan. Along the northwest side is a curtain wall, with towers in the middle and at the ends, and a gatehouse on the northeast side. The gatehouse has three storeys, it is roofless, and contains semicircular arches. The towers have four storeys, and between the north and central tower is a two-storey oriel window. Some of the other windows are mullioned, some have pointed heads, and others have a single light.	I
St Mary Magdalene Church and railing 53.07667°N 0.80813°W		12th century	The church has been altered and extended through the centuries, including restorations in the 19th century. It consists of a nave and a chancel under a continuous roof with a clerestory, north and south aisles, a north porch, a south porch with a library, north and south transepts, chantry chapels, a crypt, and an engaged west steeple. The steeple has a tower with four stages, angle buttresses, string courses, a quatrefoil frieze, a corbel table, and crocketed corner pinnacles, surmounted by an octagonal broach spire with four tiers of gabled lucarnes and a weathercock. On the west side is a doorway with a moulded surround, shafts and a hood mould, above which is a five-light lancet window, and a four-bay blind arcade. There are clock faces on all fronts, and two-light bell openings, over which is a crocketed gable. Along the body of the church are embattled parapets, and outside the church are spearhead wrought iron railings on a stone plinth.	I
Former White Hart Hotel; 53.07588°N 0.80879°W		c. 1312	The hotel, later used for other purposes, has been altered and extended through the centuries. It is timber framed with rendered stone and brick nogging, close studding, and pantile roofs with plain tile verges. The front range has three storeys, the upper storeys jettied, and three bays. In the ground floor is a 20th-century shop front, and a carriageway to the left. The upper floors have continuous windows with 24 lights, mullions and traceried heads. Below the windows are decorated bressummers, under which are plaster figures of saints with crocketed canopies. At the rear is a jettied glazed gallery, an east wing, a south range, and a three-storey stair turret.	II*
40–44 Carter Gate; 53.07507°N 0.80885°W		Mid 14th century	Three houses, later two shops, in close studded timber framing with rendered nogging, rendered underbuild, coved eaves, and a pantile roof. There are two storeys, the upper storey jettied with a bressummer, and four bays. The ground floor contains a carriage opening with, to its right a 19th-cengtury shop front with panelled pilasters and a two-light mullioned window, and to its left a doorway with a bootscraper flanked by horizontally-sliding sash windows. The upper floor contains three similar windows, and a casement window.	II
Beaumond Cross; 53.07336°N 0.80822°W		14th century	The market cross, moved to its present site in the late 20th century, was restored in 1778 and 1801. It is in stone, and has an octagonal plinth on four steps, an octagonal pedestal, and a tapered clustered shaft with a tiered finial and a cap. At the foot of the shaft is a gabled niche containing a figure, and on the pedestal is an inscribed brass plate.	II
Former Woolpack public house 53.07640°N 0.81219°W		1452	The public house, later named The Prince Rupert, is timber framed, the ground floor in brick, with a pantile roof. There are two storeys and two bays, the upper storey of the right bay jettied on curved brackets. In the centre is a doorway with a fanlight flanked by casement windows, and the upper floor contains small sash windows. At the rear is a 19th-century wing and a 20th-century addition, both in brick.	II
Governor's House; 53.07602°N 0.81006°W		1474	A house later used for other purposes, it is timber framed, with a stone and brick underbuild, rendered nogging and a pantile roof. The front has close studding, and the upper floors are coved and jettied, with billeted bressummers, coved eaves, and coped gables. There are three storeys, an L-shaped plan, a front range of three bays, and a long rear wing. In the ground floor is a 20th-century shop front and to the right is an entry. At the rear is a jettied turret.	I
22 and 24 Kirkgate; 53.07754°N 0.80963°W		Late 15th century	A house on a corner site, later used for other purposes, it is timber framed with arch braces and rendered nogging, the ground floor in colourwashed brick, and a tile roof. There are two storeys, the upper storey jettied on brackets, four bays on Kirkgate and three on Middlegate. There is a doorway on Kirkgate, and another in the angled corner, and the windows either have a single pane or are casements.	II
Queen's Head public house 53.07664°N 0.80947°W		Early 16th century	The public house is timber framed with rendered nogging, brick underbuilding, sprocketed eaves and a tile roof. The upper floors are jettied on curved brackets and contain close studding. There are three storeys and three bays. In the ground floor is a double door with a fanlight flanked by casement windows. The middle floor contains a central canted oriel window, and the other windows are casements. At the rear is a later extension in brick, and inside the public house is exposed timber framing.	II
Former Magnus School, Headmaster's house and English School; 53.07641°N 0.80659°W		1532	The oldest part is the former grammar school, to which the headmaster's house was added in 1817, and the English School at the rear in 1835. The grammar school has a timber framed core with walls in stone and brick and a tile roof. On the front facing the street are a three-light mullioned window, a single-light window, a doorway with a pointed arch over which is an inscribed tablet, and a blocked doorway with a Tudor arch and a hood mould. The rear range has two storeys and attics and seven bays. Projecting on the left is the headmaster's house, in brick, with a slate roof, three storeys and five bays, the middle bay projecting under a pediment. The central doorway has pilasters and an open pediment, above it are round-headed windows, and the other windows are sashes with flat rubbed brick heads. The English School is in brick with a [[hip roof|hipped pantile roof and a single storey. Its porch has a shaped coped gable with a crest and ball finials.	II*
4 Queen Head's Court; 53.07683°N 0.80969°W		Mid 16th century	A house later used for other purposes, the lower floor in brick, the upper floor jettied, in close studded timber framing and rendered brick nogging, and a tile roof with sprocketed eaves. In the right gable end are arched braces, a casement window, and a bow window below.	II
Newark Odinist Temple; 53.07575°N 0.80598°W		c. 1556	The chapel is in limestone on a plinth, and has a stone slate roof with coped gables, and a tent-roofed wooden bell turret. There is a single storey and a single cell. In the east and north sides are three-light mullioned widows, the south side contains a doorway with a chamfered and moulded surround, and in the west gable is a crest.	II
40–44 Castlegate; 53.07626°N 0.81355°W		Late 16th century	Three houses in a row with a timber framed core, the ground floor encased in brick, the upper floor jettied and rendered, and with a pantile roof, the left gable coped. There are two storeys, and the left house also has an attic, and three bays. On the front are three doorways, one with a Gothic-arched bootscraper. Most of the windows are horizontally-sliding sashes, and there is an inserted box window.	II
37 and 39 Kirkgate; 53.07733°N 0.80919°W		Late 16th century	Two houses, later used for other purposes, they are timber framed with rendered brick nogging and pantile roofs, and each house has two storeys, the upper storey jettied. The left house has four bays, box framing, and projecting eaves on wooden brackets. In the ground floor is a box-shaped bay window, to the left is an elaborately moulded doorcase, and to the right is a blocked recessed doorway. The upper floor contains two horizontally-sliding sash windows. The right house has close studding, in the ground floor is a doorway with a sash window to the left and a shop window and an entry to the right, and in the upper floor are horizontally-sliding sash windows.	II
34 Millgate; 53.07497°N 0.81565°W		Late 16th century	A former public house, later a private house, with outbuildings at the rear. The house has a timber framed core, encased in brick and with a slate roof. There are two storeys, two bays and a rear wing, and on the front are a doorway and sash windows, all with segmental heads. The rear wing has a pantile roof and contains horizontally-sliding sash windows, Beyond that is an outbuilding containing a hatch, a loading door, garage doors and a casement window.	II
1 Parliament Street; 53.07336°N 0.81759°W		Early 17th century	A presbytery, later used for other purposes, it is in brick on a chamfered plinth, with brick dressings, moulded floor bands, quoins, and slate roofs with coped gables. There are three storeys and fronts of three and two bays. The entrance front has two gabled bays, and contains a porch with a flat hood on fluted iron columns, and a doorway with a moulded surround and a fanlight. To its right is a canted bay window, and the other windows are sashes. On the right is a two-story extension containing a doorway, a sash window and a casement window.	II
The Friary; 53.07762°N 0.80432°W		Early 17th century	A house later remodelled, extended, and divided into a house and flats. It is in stone with dressings in brick and stone, and roofs of slate and tile. The eastern front has a plinth, quoins, three storeys and three bays. There is a porch with a parapet and a datestone, and it contains a doorway with a Tudor arch and hood mould, and the windows are sashes. In the right return is a three-light mullioned bay window, and the left return contains mullioned windows and two box dormers. The later north and east wings and porch are in Gothic style.	II*
55 Millgate; 53.07427°N 0.81654°W		Mid 17th century	A house and attached cottages, the main block with a timber framed core, encased in brick, with a partial plinth, the upper floor rendered, and with a pantile roof. There are two storeys and two bays. On the front is a doorway flanked by two windows, and in the upper floor are sash windows. The cottages at the rear are in brick with two storeys, three bays, and roofs of pantile and slate.	II
Potterdyke House; 53.07505°N 0.81204°W		Mid 17th century	The house, later offices, has been refronted and extended. It is in brick, stuccoed at the front, on a plinth, with floor bands, a parapet and hipped slate roofs. There are two storeys and attics, and a main block with five bays, flanked by ramped and coped two-storey single-bay wings. Projecting from the outer bays are boundary walls. In the centre is a doorway with a fanlight and a pediment, and the windows are sashes, those in the lower two floors with keystones. Behind the left wing is a three-storey range, and at the rear of the building is a two-storey canted bay window with modillion eaves and a parapet.	II
47 and 49 Balderton Gate; 53.07464°N 0.80641°W	—	Late 17th century	Two houses, later offices, possibly with a timber framed core, in brick, with a rendered gable and a pantile roof. There are two storeys and two bays. In the ground floor is a segmental-headed doorway, and to its right are two shop windows, the right one larger with two lights. The upper floor contains a segmental-headed horizontally-sliding sash window, and a two-light casement window to the right.	II
18 Kirkgate; 53.07778°N 0.80988°W	—	Late 17th century	A house, possibly with a timber framed core, later enclosed in brick and converted into a shop. The upper floor is rendered and colourwashed, and the roof is pantiled. There are two storeys and three bays. On the front is a doorway, to the left of which is a shop front with a three-light window and a cornice, and to the right is a shop front with a bracketed fascia. Further to the right, and in the upper floor, are horizontally-sliding sash windows.	II
27 and 29 Kirkgate; 53.07759°N 0.80945°W		Late 17th century	Two houses, later a shop, with possibly a timber framed core, in colourwashed brick, rendered at the rear, with sprocketed eaves, and a pantile roof with a single coped gable. There are two storeys and attics, and three bays. In the centre is a doorway with a fanlight and cornice, flanked by box-shaped oriel windows, and to the right is an elliptical-headed entry. The upper floor contains sash windows, and in the attic are two raking dormers. At the rear are two gables and an initialled datestone.	II
Handley House and adjoining house 53.07918°N 0.80968°W		Late 17th century	The house, which was later extended, is in brick on a chamfered plinth, with stone dressings, quoins, a floor band, modillion eaves and a hipped slate roof. The main block has two storeys and attics, and five bays. The central doorway has a rusticated surround, a fanlight, multiple keystones and a cornice. The windows on the front are sashes with flat heads and keystones, and in the attic are two pedimented dormers. At the rear the windows have segmental heads, and there is a two-story segmental bow window. Recessed to the right is a single-storey two-bay extension. The former house, adjoining on the left and recessed, has a plinth, dentilled eaves, two storeys and five bays. The doorway has a moulded reeded surround and a fanlight, and the windows have segmental heads.	II
The Chestnuts; 53.07883°N 0.80981°W		Late 17th century	The house is in limestone and brick, with a floor band, dentilled eaves, and a pantile roof with coped gables. There are two storeys and attics, four bays, and a rear wing. The round-headed doorway has a moulded brick surround and a fanlight. To its right is a canted bay window, and the other windows are sashes, that in the ground floor with a segmental head. In the rear wing are cross-casement windows, and gabled dormers.	II
Transport House; 53.07871°N 0.81000°W		Late 17th century	Two houses on a corner site, later offices, in brick with stone dressings, quoins, a floor band, modillion eaves, a bracketed gutter, and a roof of tile and pantile with a single coped gable. There are two storeys and attics, four bays on Millgate and three on Town Wharf. On the Millgate front are two doorways with fanlights and flat hoods on curved brackets, and two canted bay windows. The other windows are sashes with segmental heads, and in the attics are hipped dormers.	II
57 and 59 Castlegate; 53.07623°N 0.81315°W		c. 1700	Two houses, later a shop, with a timber framed core, encased in brick and colourwashed, with dentilled eaves, and a pantile roof. There are two storeys and three bays. In the ground floor is a late 19th-century shop window, with pilasters and a cornice, and to the left is a doorway with a bootscraper and a window, both under a lintel. The upper floor contains horizontally-sliding sash windows.	II
40 and 41 Market Place; 53.07595°N 0.80920°W		1721	A coaching inn, later used for other purposes, in brick, with stone dressings, chamfered quoins, a floor band, moulded eaves and a hipped pantile roof. There are three storeys, eight bays, and a rear wing. In the ground floor is an arcade of eight Tuscan columns with a continuous cornice. In the fourth bay is a carriage entrance, and to its left is a 20th-century shop front. To the right is a rendered wall on a plinth, containing two sash windows flanked by doorways with fanlights. The upper floors contain sash windows, and in the centre of the middle floor is a bust of a Saracen's head. The rear wing has a pantile roof, two storeys and attics, and seven bays, and it contains sash windows and raking dormers.	II*
9 and 9A Appleton Gate; 53.07622°N 0.80732°W	—	Early 18th century	A house, later shops, on a corner site, in brick with a tile roof. There are two storeys and attics, a front of three bays, and one bay on the right return. In the ground floor is a shop window, and to the right is a shop front extending round the corner, with a continuous fascia and a recessed doorway in the angle. The upper floor contains sash windows, the middle one blank, in the right return is a segmental blank window, and in the attic are two box dormers.	II
14 Balderton Gate; 53.07529°N 0.80728°W		Early 18th century	Two houses, later shops, in colourwashed brick, with bracketed gutters, and a pantile roof with coped gables. There are two storeys and five bays. In the ground floor is a 19th-century style shop front with panelled pilasters and a bracketed fascia containing a recessed doorway. The upper floor contains four sash windows and a small casement window.	II
11, 11A and 11B Barnby Gate; 53.07583°N 0.80706°W		Early 18th century	A pair of houses in brick, rendered and colourwashed at the front, with double rebated eaves and a pantile roof. There are two storeys and two bays. In the centre are paired doorways, and the windows are casements.	II
15–21 Boar Lane; 53.07713°N 0.81061°W		Early 18th century	Four houses, later three shops, in colourwashed brick with pantile roofs. There are two storeys, some with attics, and nine bays. In the ground floor are shop fronts, shop windows, and doorways with segmental heads. Most of the windows in the upper floor are horizontally-sliding sashes, and there is a gabled dormer.	II
25 Bridge Street; 53.07581°N 0.80765°W		Early 18th century	A house, later shops, in brick, with stone dressings, rusticated quoins, a floor band, an eaves band, a coped parapet with blank panels, and a coped gable at the rear. There are three storeys, seven bays on the front, three on the left return, and five on the right return. In the ground floor are 20th-century shop fronts under a continuous fascia. The upper floors contain sash windows in moulded architraves, those in the middle floor with segmental heads, and some in both floors with keystones.	II
25 Carter Gate; 53.07507°N 0.80863°W		Early 18th century	A house, later a shop, in brick, with stone dressings, quoins on the right, a chamfered floor band, moulded wooden eaves, gutters on brackets, and a pantile roof with one coped gable. There are two storeys and attics, and four bays. In the ground floor is a shop front with a segmental head, to the right is a three-light shop window, and further to the right is a doorway with moulded jambs. The upper floor contains sash windows, and in the attic are three raking dormers.	II
33 and 35 Carter Gate; 53.07472°N 0.80909°W	—	Early 18th century	Two houses, later shops, rendered, with a pantile roof and coped gables. There are two storeys and three bays. In the ground floor are three shop fronts, the left two with bow windows and a recessed doorway. The upper floor contains three-light casement windows.	II
46 and 48 Castlegate; 53.07619°N 0.81369°W		Early 18th century	A house and a shop in brick, partly rendered, with cogged eaves and roofs of slate and pantile. There are two storeys and six bays. In the ground floor is a shop front dating from about 1840, with a cornice, and a central doorway with a fanlight. To its right is a doorway and a sash window, both with segmental heads. The upper floor contains three sash windows and three blank openings.	II
5 and 5A Church Street; 53.07677°N 0.80896°W	—	Early 18th century	A shop and a flat in colourwashed brick with a floor band, cogged eaves, and a tile roof with coped gables. There are three storeys and two bays. In the ground floor is a shop front with a cornice and a cast iron crest, and to the left is a segmental-headed entry. The upper floors contain sash windows, those in the middle floor with segmental heads.	II
1 and 2 Church Walk; 53.07622°N 0.80732°W	—	Early 18th century	Two houses on a corner site, later a house and a shop, in brick, with a floor band, modillion eaves, and a tile roof. There are two storeys and attics and a front of four bays. In the ground floor is a shop window, and a doorway with a segmental head and a moulded surround. The windows are sashes with segmental heads, and in the attic is a dormer.	II
48 and 48A Kirkgate; 53.07684°N 0.80896°W		Early 18th century	Two houses, later shops, on a corner site, possibly with a timber framed core, they have a rendered upper floor, and a pantile roof with a single coped gable. There are two storeys, four bays on Kirkgate, and two on Church Street. On the ground floor is a shop front on the corner with a splayed doorway, and on Kirkgate is a smaller shop front. The upper floor contains sash windows, and there are two blanks openings on Kirkgate.	II
12, 12A and 13 Market Place; 53.07647°N 0.80922°W		Early 18th century	Two houses, later a shop, it is rendered and painted, and has an eaves band and a panelled parapet. There are three storeys, a front of three bays, two bays on the left return, and a recessed rear wing. In the ground floor are four Tuscan columns, behind which are a central doorway and flanking bow windows. There is a bow window in the left return, and the upper floors contain sash windows. Between the upper floors on each front are lettered panels.	II
25 and 26 Market Place; 53.07630°N 0.80814°W		Early 18th century	A pair of houses later used for other purposes, in brick on a plinth, with floor bands, a coped parapet with five blank panels, and a tile roof with a coped gable. There are three storeys and five bays. The central doorway has a fanlight and a moulded segmental pediment on brackets. To its right is an elliptical-headed window flanked by round-arched doorways, The other windows are sashes with segmental heads. In the left return is a doorway with a stone hood on scroll brackets.	II
31 and 32 Market Place; 53.07595°N 0.80859°W		Early 18th century	Two houses, later shops, in brick with stone dressings, each shop with three storeys. The left shop has four bays, lintel bands, chamfered quoins on the right, and a panelled coped parapet. In the ground floor is a 20th-century shop front, and the upper floors contain sash windows with wedge lintels and keystones. The right shop has three bays, the front is stuccoed, and it has a slate roof, moulded sill bands, moulded eaves and a single coped gable. In the ground floor is a similar shop front, and the upper floors contain sash windows, those in the middle floor with moulded cornices and hood moulds.	II
43 Market Place; 53.07594°N 0.80938°W		Early 18th century	Originally the Clinton Arms, a coaching inn, later used for other purposes, it is in brick, with dressings in stone and stucco, rusticated quoins, and pilasters flanking the middle bay, a cornice, a central pediment and a panelled parapet. There are three storeys and seven bays, and parallel rear wings. In the ground floor is a seven-bay arcade with Tuscan columns, the central and outer columns rusticated. In the centre is a carriage entrance, on its left is a shop front, and on the right is a doorway flanked by sash windows. The upper floors contain sash windows, those in the middle floor have Gibbs surrounds and multiple keystones, and alternate windows have a pediment and a pseudo-balustrade. The top floor windows have moulded surrounds, multiple keystones, and aprons.	II*
12 and 14 Middlegate; 53.07730°N 0.81023°W	—	Early 18th century	Two houses, later an office, in colourwashed rendered brick, with a pantile roof and coping gables. There are two storeys and attics, two bays, and a full-length rear lean-to. In the ground floor is a shop front with a recessed splayed doorway on the left. The upper floor contains sash windows, and in the left return are casement windows.	II
18 Middlegate; 53.07718°N 0.81035°W	—	Early 18th century	A house, later a store, in painted brick, with a floor band, plain eaves and a pantile roof. There are two storeys and a single bay. In the ground floor is a carriage entrance with a wooden lintel, and above is a hatch.	II
23 Middlegate; 53.07683°N 0.81047°W		Early 18th century	A public house on a corner site, later a shop, in brick on a plinth, with a floor band, cogged and dentilled eaves and a tile roof with coped gables. There are two storeys and attics, and four bays. In the ground floor is a shop window, to the right is a segmental-headed doorway with a fanlight, and further to the right is a carriageway converted into a recessed doorway. The upper floor contains sash windows with segmental heads, in the attic are two gabled dormers, and in the left return is a three-light shop window.	II
1 and 3 Millgate; 53.07570°N 0.81418°W		Early 18th century	A pair of houses with a timber framed core, encased in brick, the upper storey rendered and colourwashed, with roofs of pantile and slate. There are two storeys and two bays. In the ground floor are two doorways, a shop window and a sash window, and the upper floor contains sash windows.	II
37 and 37A Stodman Street; 53.07623°N 0.81140°W	—	Early 18th century	A house, later offices, in colourwashed brick, on a rendered plinth, with floor bands, and a coped parapet containing four blank panels. There are three storeys and four bays. In the ground floor is a full-width shop front with panelled pilasters, hooded brackets, a cornice and a recessed doorway. The upper floors contain sash windows with panelled lintels and keystones, the middle two windows in the top floor blind.	II
Newark Town and District Club; 53.07548°N 0.80553°W		Early 18th century	A house later used for other purposes, in brick with stone dressings, floor bands, an eaves cornice, moulded dentilled eaves]] at the rear, a coped parapet, and a slate roof with coped gables. The main block has three storeys, a double depth plan, and five bays, the middle bay projecting. In the centre is a doorway with a moulded surround, a keystone, and a pediment on scroll brackets. The windows are sashes, those in the bay above the doorway with moulded architraves and keystones, and the others with segmental heads. On the right is a two-storey later extension with a hipped roof, and there is a single-storey billiard room.	II
Riverside Cottage; 53.07700°N 0.81285°W		Early 18th century	A brick house with cogged eaves, and a pantile roof with coped gables. There are three storeys and two bays. The windows are a mix of sashes and casements, some with segmental heads.	II
Former Robin Hood Hotel; 53.07471°N 0.81011°W		Early 18th century	Three houses and a public house converted for other uses. The building consists of three blocks, each with a floor band and two storeys. The middle block is stuccoed, and has a slate roof, five bays, a central doorway and sash windows. The right block is stuccoed, and has dentilled eaves, a slate roof, three bays, a central Ionic doorway with a moulded surround, and sash windows with segmental heads. The left block is in brick with an eaves band, cogged and dentilled eaves, a pantile roof, three bays, a shop front, and segmental-headed sash windows.	II
Former Royal Oak public house 53.07756°N 0.81110°W		Early 18th century	The public house, which may have a timber framed core, is in colourwashed brick, and has a pantile roof with a single coped gable. There are two storeys and an L-shaped plan, with a front range of three bays. In the ground floor is a carriage entry flanked by windows with segmental heads, and the upper floor contains horizontally-sliding sash windows.	II
The Wharf Café; 53.07897°N 0.81104°W		Early 18th century	The warehouse, later converted into a café, is in rendered brick with a hipped tile roof. There are two storeys, five bays, and single-bay extensions at the ends. It contains doorways, one with side lights and a lean-to porch, and the windows are casements.	II
27 and 28 Market Place and 1, 3 and 5 Bridge Street; 53.07620°N 0.80822°W		c. 1730	A house, later shops and offices, in brick on a plinth, with stone dressings, floor bands, deeply coved eaves and a hipped slate roof. There are three storeys and attics, with five bays on the front, and four on the right return. In the centre is an elaborate doorway with a moulded segmental pediment on double moulded scroll brackets, containing an oeil-de-boeuf in the tympanum, and elsewhere are shop fronts. The upper floors contain sash windows with keystones, those in the middle floor with segmental heads, and in the attics are pedimented dormers.	II*
33 Millgate; 53.07507°N 0.81520°W		c. 1730	A brick house with floor bands, dentilled eaves, and a pantile roof with coped gables. There are two storeys and attics, and two bays. In the ground floor is a doorway with a segmental head, and to the right is a round-arched entry. The windows are horizontally-sliding sashes with segmental heads, and in the attic is a gabled dormer.	II
Martin Forster House; 53.07625°N 0.80704°W		c. 1730	A vicarage, later offices, in brick on a plinth, with a floor band, a moulded eaves band, and a Welsh slate roof with coped gables. There are two storeys and attics, and seven bays, the middle bay projecting under a pediment. The central doorway has fluted pilasters, a pediment, and round-headed bootscrapers. The windows are sashes, the window over the doorway with a flat head, and the others with segmental heads, and in the attic are four box dormers. At the rear is a service wing with a tile roof.	II*
40 Northgate; 53.07951°N 0.80827°W	—	c. 1740	A house, later offices, in brick on a plinth, with stone dressings, floor bands, cogged and dentilled eaves, and a pantile roof with coped gables. There are three storeys and four bays. Steps lead up to the doorway, which is in Classical style, and has a Gothic fanlight and an open pediment on scroll brackets. The windows are sashes with segmental heads, and there is a two-storey extension with a blank Diocletian window.	II
31 Millgate; 53.07513°N 0.81510°W		c. 1750	A brick house on a rendered plinth, with a floor band, rebated eaves, bracketed gutters and a pantile roof. There are two storeys and two bays. In the ground floor is a doorway with a segmental head, and to the right is a round-headed entry, over which is an inscribed cast iron plate. The windows are horizontally-sliding sashes, those in the ground floor with segmental heads.	II
11 and 13 Appleton Gate; 53.07663°N 0.80677°W		Mid 18th century	Two houses later used for other purposes, they are in brick, with floor bands, cogged and dentilled eaves, and tile roofs with coped gables. There are two storeys and attics, and eleven bays. In the centre is a round-arched passage entry, and to its right is a 19th-century shop front with decorative pilasters, a dentilled cornice, and a recessed doorway. The left six bays contain a doorway with a fanlight and sash windows, all with segmental heads, and in the attic are gabled dormers. In the upper floor, the right five bays contain cross-casement windows with segmental heads.	II
29 and 31 Appleton Gate; 53.07702°N 0.80634°W		Mid 18th century	Two houses, later shops, in brick, with a floor band, dentilled eaves and a pantile roof. There are two storeys and attics, and five bays. In the centre is an entry with an ogee-headed bootscraper, flanked by shop fronts. The upper floor contains a casement window, two sash windows, and two blocked windows, all with segmental heads, and in the attic are two raking dormers.	II
37 Appleton Gate; 53.07726°N 0.80616°W		Mid 18th century	A house, later a shop, in brick, with floor bands, dentilled eaves, and a slate roof. There are three storeys and four bays. In the ground floor is a full-width shop front with a fascia cornice on brackets. The upper floors contain sash windows, those in the middle floor with segmental heads, and one in the top floor blank.	II
39 and 41 Appleton Gate; 53.07735°N 0.80605°W		Mid 18th century	Two houses, later houses and a shop, in brick with floor bands, dentilled eaves on the right and roofs of pantile and slate. There are three storeys and three bays. In the ground floor is a 20th-century shop front with a fascia, flanked by round-headed passage entries. The upper floors contain sash windows, most with segmental heads, and one tripartite.	II
4 Balderton Gate; 53.07563°N 0.80762°W	—	Mid 18th century	A house, later a shop, in colourwashed brick, with a cogged eaves band, sprocketed eaves and a pantile roof. There are two storeys and a single bay. In the ground floor is a shop front, and the upper floor contains a casement window.	II
12 Balderton Gate; 53.07536°N 0.80737°W		Mid 18th century	A house, later a shop, in colourwashed brick, with dentilled eaves, bracketed gutters, and a pantile roof with a coped gable. There are two storeys, two bays and a lean-to at the rear. In the ground floor is a late 19th-century shop front with panelled pilasters, a cornice, and a splayed central doorway. The upper floor contains sash windows.	II
29 and 31 Balderton Gate; 53.07507°N 0.80684°W	—	Mid 18th century	Two houses, later a shop, in brick with a pantile roof. There are two storeys and three bays. In the ground floor is a shop front with a fascia, to the right is a segmental-arched doorway with a fanlight, and an entry with a chamfered round arch, and the upper floor contains sash windows.	II
33 Balderton Gate; 53.07499°N 0.80678°W	—	Mid 18th century	A brick house with a rendered right gable, a floor band, and a pantile roof with a single coped gable. There are two storeys and attics, two bays, and a porch attached on the right. In the ground floor is a shop window, and to its left is a sash window with a rubbed brick head. The upper floor contains sash windows, and in the attic are gabled dormers.	II
33 Barnby Gate; 53.07544°N 0.80573°W		Mid 18th century	A coach house converted into a shop, it is in brick with dentilled eaves and a hipped tile roof. There is a single storey and an attic, and a front of two bays. On the left is an elliptical-arched carriage entrance with imposts and a keystone, now glazed, and to the right is a shop front with a recessed doorway. In the attic is a gabled dormer, and the right return contains a doorway and two windows, all blank and with segmental heads.	II
7 and 9 Bridge Street; 53.07610°N 0.80811°W	—	Mid 18th century	A pair of houses, later shops, in brick, with dressings in stone and brick, and a moulded dentilled eaves cornice. There are three storeys and five bays. In the ground floor are two shop fronts, the left dating from the 19th-century, with panelled pilaster, a cornice on scroll brackets and a recessed doorway, and on the right is a 20th-century tiled shop front with a continuous fascia. The upper floors contain sash windows, some dummies, with multi-keystoned lintels.	II
19 Carter Gate; 53.07530°N 0.80832°W		Mid 18th century	A house, later a shop, in brick, with a floor band and a slate mansard roof. There are three storeys and an attic, and two bays. In the ground floor is a shop front, and to the right is a doorway with a segmental head and a fanlight. The upper floors contain sash windows, those in the middle floor with segmental heads, and in the attics are box dormers.	II
39 and 41 Carter Gate; 53.07457°N 0.80937°W	—	Mid 18th century	Two houses, later shops, in brick, with stone dressings, cogged and dentilled eaves, and a Roman tile roof with coped gables. There are two storeys and five bays. In the ground floor are shop fronts and pilasters, the outer ones with gabled fluted brackets, and the upper floor contains sash windows.	II
7 Castlegate; 53.07794°N 0.81051°W		Mid 18th century	A public house, later a private house, in brick, with rebated eaves, an incomplete eaves band and a pantile roof. There are two storeys and an L-shaped plan, with a front range of five bays. In the ground floor are a carriage entrance, a doorway and a recess, and the windows are sashes. All the openings have segmental heads.	II
11 Castlegate; 53.07775°N 0.81077°W		Mid 18th century	A house converted for other uses, it is in brick on a plinth, with stone dressings, a floor band, dentilled eaves and a hipped slate roof. There are two storeys and attics, and five bays, the middle bay projecting, with quoins and a pediment. The central doorway has a reeded surround, a fanlight, and a pediment on consoles. To its right is a carriage entrance, elsewhere, the windows are sashes with rubbed brick heads, and in the attic are three box dormers.	II
21, 23 and 23A Castlegate; 53.07725°N 0.81146°W		Mid 18th century	A pair of houses, later used for other purposes, in brick with stone dressings, a sill band, coved eaves, and a slate roof with a coped gable. There are three storeys and ten bays, the middle three bays of each house projecting under a pediment. In the ground floor are shop fronts and a garage entry. The upper floors contain sash windows, those in the middle floor with multi-keystoned lintels.	II
25 Castlegate; 53.07712°N 0.81164°W		Mid 18th century	A house later used for other purposes, in brick on a plinth, with stone dressings, corner pilasters, modillion eaves and a slate roof. There are three storeys and five bays, the middle three bays projecting under a modillion pediment containing a lunette. In the centre is a doorway with a reeded surround, a fanlight, and an open pediment on consoles, flanked by shop windows. The upper floors contain sash windows, the middle three in the middle storey with keystones.	II
31, 31A and 31B Castlegate; 53.07700°N 0.81187°W		Mid 18th century	A house, later offices, in brick on a plinth, with stone dressings, sill bands, moulded eaves, a moulded parapet, and a slate roof. There are three storeys and four bays. The second bay projects under a pediment, and contains an elliptical-arched recess with imposts, containing a doorway with a moulded surround, a fanlight, a pediment on consoles, and round-headed bootscrapers. In the right bay is a doorway with a flat head, a fanlight and a keystone. The windows are ashes with multiple keystones.	II
6 Chain Lane; 53.07667°N 0.81010°W	—	Mid 18th century	A house, later a shop, in colourwashed brick, with moulded eaves, and a pantile roof with a single coped gable. There are two storeys and a single bay. In the ground floor is a late 19th-century shop front with a corniced fascia, and above it is a six-pane window.	II
10 Chain Lane; 53.07662°N 0.80996°W	—	Mid 18th century	Three houses, later a shop, in colourwashed rendered brick with a pantile roof. There are two storeys and three bays. In the ground floor is a shop front and a shop window, and the upper floor contains two casement windows and an oriel window.	II
35 and 35A Kirkgate; 53.07740°N 0.80930°W	—	Mid 18th century	A house, later a shop and flat, in brick with stone dressings, a moulded eaves cornice, and a pantile roof with a single coped gable. There are three storeys and four bays. IN the ground floor is a shop front dating from about 1900, with panelled pilasters, a fascia and a splayed central doorway, and to its right is an elliptical-arched entry. The upper floors contain sash windows with rubbed brick heads, one of them blank.	II
42 Kirkgate; 53.07709°N 0.80912°W	—	Mid 18th century	A public house, later used for other purposes, in brick on a plinth, with stone dressings, floor bands, a moulded modillion eaves cornice and a slate roof with a coped gable. There are three storeys, four bays, the middle two bays projecting slightly, and a rear wing with three storeys and six bays. The doorway in the second bay has a Gibbs surround and a keystone, above which is a segmental fanlight with a keystone and a hood mould. This flanked by elliptical headed windows with keystones, and in the right bay is an elliptical-headed carriage entrance with multiple keystones. In the middle floor, the first and third bays contain canted oriel windows, and the other windows are sashes with multi-keystoned lintels.	II
5, 6 and 7 Market Place and 9 Chain Lane; 53.07657°N 0.80955°W	—	Mid 18th century	Three houses, later shops, in colourwashed brick, with stone dressings, quoins, a moulded floor band, and a slate roof. There are three storeys and attics, and five bays. In the ground floor is an entry to Chain Lane, flanked by shop fronts. The upper floors contain sash windows with segmental heads, and in the attics are three pedimented dormers.	II
46 Market Place; 53.07600°N 0.80975°W	—	Mid 18th century	A house, later a shop, in painted brick with stone dressings, a sill band, a moulded eaves cornice, a low parapet, and a slate roof with coped gables. There are three storeys and attics, three bays, and a rear wing with a hipped pantile roof. In the ground floor is a full-width shop front with a central doorway and a continuous fascia. The upper floors contain sash windows, and in the attic are three box dormers.	II
56 and 58 Millgate; 53.07428°N 0.81680°W	—	Mid 18th century	A pair of brick houses on a rendered plinth, with cogged eaves and a pantile roof. There are two storeys and two bays. The windows are horizontally-sliding sashes, flanked in the ground floor by doorways, all with segmental heads.	II
9 and 11 Northgate; 53.07932°N 0.80905°W		Mid 18th century	A pair of brick houses with dentilled eaves, and a pantile roof with coped gables. There are three storeys and two bays. In the ground floor are two doorways, the left with a segmental head. The windows are sashes, those in the lower two floors with segmental heads.	II
27, 29 and 31 Northgate; 53.07986°N 0.80823°W		Mid 18th century	Three houses, later shops, in brick on a plinth, with floor bands, dentilled eaves, and a pantile roof with coped gables. There are three storeys and three bays. The right shop has a doorway with a segmental head and a fanlight, and to its right is a three-light shop window with shaped lights and a cornice. Above is an oriel window and a segmental-headed sash window. The middle shop has a shop front with a splayed central doorway and a fascia on brackets, and above are flat-headed sash windows. On the left is a segmental-headed doorway with a fanlight, a shop window with a cornice to the right, and a round-headed entry to the left. Above are segmental-headed sash windows.	II
25 and 26 Stodman Street; 53.07603°N 0.81017°W	—	Mid 18th century	A pair of houses later converted for other uses, in brick, with stone dressings, chamfered quoins, a sill band, coved eaves and a slate roof. There are four storeys and five bays. In the centre is a round-headed doorway with a rusticated surround and a fanlight. It is flanked by shop fronts, the one on the left with panelled pilasters, a cornice, and a three-light mullioned window, and that on the right with a metal and tile surround and a plain fascia. The windows are sashes with wedge lintels and keystones, those in the middle bay also with moulded surrounds.	II
38, 39 and 40 Stodman Street; 53.07628°N 0.81157°W	—	Mid 18th century	Three houses, later shops, they are stuccoed, with lintel bands, and a coped parapet with blank panels. There are three storeys and seven bays. In the ground floor are three shop fronts, the right one dating from the 19th-century with fluted Ionic pilasters and a decorative dentilled cornice, and to its left is a doorway with a decorative cast iron grill. In the upper floors are sash windows and some blank windows.	II
Church House; 53.07634°N 0.80768°W		Mid 18th century	The house is in brick, stuccoed on the front and side, on a plinth, with chamfered quoins, a floor band, moulded and dentilled eaves, and a slate roof. There are two storeys and five bays, the middle bay projecting slightly. In the centre, steps with iron handrails lead to a porch with Doric columns and a flat hood, containing a doorway with a fanlight. The windows are sashes with multi-keystoned lintels. On the right side is a doorway with a moulded surround, a fanlight, and an open pediment on scroll brackets.	II
Nottinghamshire County Council Social Services Office; 53.07453°N 0.80705°W		Mid 18th century	A house, later offices, in brick, with stone dressings, chamfered quoins. floor bands, a coped parapet, and a hipped slate roof. The main block has three storeys, five bays, and flanking two-storey wings, In the centre is a square projecting coped porch and a doorway with a fanlight, and the windows are sashes with keystones. At the rear is a canted bay window, and in the left return is a doorway with a moulded surround and a hood on brackets.	II
Old King's Arms public house 53.07789°N 0.80978°W		Mid 18th century	A public house and a shop in brick, with dressings in stone and stucco, cogged eaves, and a pantile roof with a single coped gable. There are two storeys and attics, ten bays, and a rear wing. The public house has a stuccoed ground floor, and it contains a doorway with a moulded surround and a cornice, flanked by sash windows with chamfered surrounds and keystones. Above the doorway are the Royal Arms in cast iron flanked by sash windows, and in the attic are two raking dormers. To the left is a segmental-headed carriage entrance with imposts and a keystone, over which is an inscribed plate. Further to the left is a shop front with a recessed central door under a full-width fascia.	II
Warehouse at rear of 7 Bargate (southeast); 53.07860°N 0.81032°W	—	Mid 18th century	The warehouse is in brick on a plinth, with stone dressings, a floor band, cogged and dentilled eaves and a tile roof. There are two storeys and five bays. The windows are sashes with segmental heads, two of them blank.	II
28 and 30 Castlegate; 53.07646°N 0.81326°W	—	c. 1760	Two houses, later a house and a shop, in brick, with a floor band, dentilled eaves, and a pantile roof with a single coped gable. There are two storeys and attics, and four bays. In the ground floor are two segmental-headed doorways with reeded surrounds and hoods, one with a fanlight, and to the left is an entry with a chamfered segmental head. The windows are sashes, those in the ground floor with segmental heads, and in the upper floor with lintels, and in the attic is a raking dormer.	II
1–21 Wilson Street; 53.07744°N 0.80852°W		1766	A terrace of red brick houses, some converted for other purposes, on a plinth, with floor bands, modillion eaves and pantile roofs. There are three storeys and cellars, and 20 bays. The middle bay projects slightly, and the three bays at both ends projecting as pavilions. In the middle of the centre bay is a round-arched passage doorway with a fanlight, most of the windows are sashes, and the cellar windows have segmental heads.	II
15 Wilson Street; 53.07765°N 0.80814°W	—	1766	The end pavilion of a former terrace converted into flats, in brick with stone dressings, floor bands, modillion eaves and a hipped pantile roof. There are three storeys and fronts of three bays. Steps lead up to the central doorway that has a fanlight, and adjacent to it is a round-headed bootscraper. The windows are sashes.	II
28 Wilson Street; 53.07706°N 0.80856°W	—	1766	The end pavilion of a former terrace, in brick with stone dressings, floor bands, modillion eaves and a hipped pantile roof. There are three storeys and fronts of three and four bays. Steps lead up to the doorway that has a fanlight, and the windows are sashes. To the right is a single-story extension in colourwashed brick with a hipped slate roof.	II
Causeway arches 500 metres northwest of level crossing 53.08419°N 0.81698°W		1768–70	The causeway was designed by John Smeaton to carry the Great North Road (A616 road) over the flood plain of the River Trent. The nine arches are in brick with stone dressings, they are semicircular with intermediate pilasters, and above each arch is a stone spout. The parapet is coped, and has ramped curved ends and round brick piers.	II
Causeway arches 650 metres northwest of level crossing 53.08520°N 0.81767°W	—	1768–70	The causeway was designed by John Smeaton to carry the Great North Road (A616 road) over the flood plain of the River Trent. The 15 arches are in brick with stone dressings, they are semicircular with intermediate pilasters. The parapet is coped, and has ramped curved ends and round piers.	II
Causeway arches 900 metres northwest of level crossing 53.08726°N 0.81905°W	—	1768–70	The causeway was designed by John Smeaton to carry the Great North Road (A616 road) over the flood plain of the River Trent. The two arches are in brick with stone dressings, they are semicircular with an intermediate pilaster. The parapet is coped, and has ramped curved ends and round piers.	II
Causeway arch 1300 metres northwest of level crossing 53.08974°N 0.82065°W	—	1768–70	The causeway was designed by John Smeaton to carry the Great North Road (A616 road) over the flood plain of the River Trent. The arch is in stone with brick coping, and it consists of a single semicircular arch with flanking pilasters. The parapet wall is coped, and has ramped curved ends and round piers.	II
Causeway culvert 135 metres northwest of level crossing 53.08094°N 0.81486°W	—	1768–70	The causeway was designed by John Smeaton to carry the Great North Road (A616 road) over the flood plain of the River Trent. The culvert is in brick with stone coping, and has three semicircular arches. The retaining parapet wall has curved ends and square piers with flat caps.	II
Causeway culvert 420 metres northwest of level crossing 53.08226°N 0.81571°W	—	1768–70	The causeway was designed by John Smeaton to carry the Great North Road (A616 road) over the flood plain of the River Trent. The culvert is in brick with stone coping. It has a single segmental arch and a semicircular retaining parapet wall.	II
Viaduct south of Muskham Bridge; 53.09154°N 0.82187°W	—	1770	The viaduct is part of the causeway designed by John Smeaton to carry the Great North Road (A616 road) over the flood plain of the River Trent. It is in brick and consists of 13 round arches with buttresses between. The parapets are in brick with stone coping, and have scrolled and ramped ends with round brick piers.	II
12 Appleton Gate; 53.07635°N 0.80686°W		c. 1770	A house later used for other purposes, it is in brick on a plinth, with stone dressings, floor bands, an eaves band, a coped parapet, and a pantile roof with coped gables. There are three storeys and an L-shaped plan, with a front range of seven bays, and at the rear are a wing and a stair projection. The main doorway has a moulded surround, a fanlight, and an open dentilled pediment on reeded brackets, and to its left is a round-headed boot scraper. To the right is a doorway with a fanlight and a segmental head, and the windows are sashes with segmental heads.	II
5 Kirkgate; 53.07818°N 0.81021°W		c. 1770	A house on a corner site, later used for other purposes, in brick, partly rendered, with floor bands, cogged eaves, and a pantile roof with coped gables. There are three storeys and four bays, and a two-storey rear wing. In the ground floor is a shop front with pilasters and a dentilled corniced fascia on scroll brackets, and to the right is an elliptical-arched entry. The upper floors contain sash windows, one blank.	II
Old Lock House and railings 53.07633°N 0.81439°W		1773	The house is in brick on a plinth, with dentilled eaves and pantile roofs. There are two storeys, three bays flanked by lean-to wings, and at the rear is a two-storey wing. In the centre is a doorway, above it is a single-light window, the other windows are tripartite, and all have segmental heads. In the left wing is a canted porch, and the right wing contains a canted bay window. Along the front of the garden is a dwarf brick wall with chamfered stone coping, iron spearhead railings and a gate.	II
Town Hall; 53.07638°N 0.80974°W		c. 1774–76	The town hall, designed by John Carr in Palladian style, is in Mansfield white sandstone, on a plinth, with a frieze, a dentilled cornice, and an open balustrade with corner urns. There are three storeys and seven bays. The middle three bays project and contain a giant tetrastyle Doric portico with a balustrade, a pediment containing the town arms, surmounted by a statue of Justice that is flanked by pedestals with statues of a lion and a unicorn. Within the portico are three windows, the central one with a pediment and the outer ones corniced. The ground floor is rusticated and contains three arched openings with imposts and multiple keystones. The windows are sashes, those in the middle floor with cornices and pseudo-balustrades. To the left is a four-storey single-bay brick extension with a round-arched entry.	I
Trent Bridge; 53.07855°N 0.81260°W		1775	The bridge carries the Great North Road over the River Trent, and it was widened and extended in 1848. It is in brick faced in stone, and consists of seven graduated semicircular arches with string courses, multiple keystones, the central ones corniced, and pilasters between the arches. On the bridge are cast iron railings, and a central pedestal with the Town Arms and a lamp. The end piers are rectangular and have blank shield panels and lamps.	II
8 Appleton Gate; 53.07612°N 0.80721°W	—	c. 1775	A house, later flats, in brick, with stone dressings, a floor band, cogged and dentilled eaves, and a tile roof with coped gables. There are three storeys, five bays, and a rear wing. In the ground floor is an elliptical-arched carriage entrance on the right, and the windows are sashes, some blank, with segmental heads in the lower two floors. The rear wing has two storeys and attics, two bays, sash windows, and a raking dormer in the attic.	II
60 Millgate; 53.07421°N 0.81686°W		c. 1775	A brick house on a plinth, with a floor band, cogged eaves and a slate roof. There are three storeys and five bays. In the centre is a doorway with a semicircular fanlight, and the windows are sashes. All the openings have rubbed brick heads.	II
2 and 4 Appleton Gate; 53.07602°N 0.80734°W		Late 18th century	A house, later a shop, in brick with floor bands, dentilled eaves, and a pantile roof with a coped gable. There are three storeys and two bays. On the front is a late 19th-century wooden shop front with a dentilled cornice on brackets, to the left is a doorway with an ornamental keystone, and to the right is a splayed doorway with a fanlight. In each of the upper floors is a segmental-headed tripartite sash window, and a smaller blank window to the left.	II
23–27 Appleton Gate; 53.07695°N 0.80645°W		Late 18th century	Three houses on a corner site, later converted for other uses, in brick, with a floor band, rebated eaves, and a pantile roof with coped gables. There are three storeys, a front of four bays, and a rounded corner. In the ground floor are two shop fronts, to the left and in the upper floors are sash windows, some of which are dummies, and some have segmental heads. In the left return is a doorway with a fanlight, a bow window, and two horizontally-sliding sash windows.	II
43 Appleton Gate; 53.07741°N 0.80599°W		Late 18th century	A house and a shop at the end of a row, in brick, partly painted, the right gable rendered and painted, with a floor band, dentilled eaves, and a pantile roof with coped gables. There are three storeys and three bays. In the left bay is a round-headed passage entry, and to the right is a shop front with pilasters, a fascia cornice and a recessed doorway. The upper floors contain sash windows, those in the middle floor with segmental heads, and the middle window in the top floor is blank.	II
2 Balderton Gate; 53.07562°N 0.80765°W	—	Late 18th century	A house in colourwashed brick, with dentilled eaves and a pantile roof. There are two storeys and three bays. On the front is a doorway with a segmental head and a fanlight, and to its left is part of a shop front. Above are casement windows with segmental heads, one between the floors.	II
6 Balderton Gate; 53.07554°N 0.80752°W	—	Late 18th century	A house later used for other purposes, it is in brick with rebated eaves and a pantile roof. There are three storeys and five bays. In the ground floor is a shop window with a cornice, flanked by doorways, the left with a fanlight, and on the right is a round-arched entry. The upper floors contain sash windows and blank windows with segmental heads.	II
8 and 10 Balderton Gate; 53.07547°N 0.80748°W	—	Late 18th century	Two houses, later shops, in brick, with rebated and dentilled eaves, and a pantile roof with a single coped gable. There are three storeys and five bays. In the ground floor are two late 19th-century shop fronts, the left with a rendered surround, a segmental-headed doorway with a fanlight and a window with a cornice. The right shop front has panelled pilasters, a cornice on brackets, and a doorway with a fanlight. In the upper floors are sash windows alternating with blank windows, all with segmental heads.	II
9, 11 and 11A Balderton Gate; 53.07542°N 0.80721°W	—	Late 18th century	Two houses, later shops, in colourwashed brick, with rebated eaves and a pantile roof. There are two storeys and four bays. In the ground floor is a shop front with a central doorway, and an entry doorway to the right, and the upper floor contains sash windows with splayed rendered lintels.	II
25 and 27 Balderton Gate; 53.07514°N 0.80693°W		Late 18th century	Two houses converted for other uses, in brick, with a floor band, cogged eaves and a pantile roof with one coped gable. There are two storeys and attics, and five bays. In the ground floor is a shop front with a fascia on brackets and a splayed doorway with a fanlight. To its right is a larger shop front with a cornice, and further to the right is a round-headed entry. The upper floor contains a casement window, two sash windows and two blank windows, and in the attic are a box dormer and a gabled dormer.	II
1–9 Barnby Gate; 53.07589°N 0.80727°W		Late 18th century	Five houses, later four shops, on a corner site, in brick, with a floor band, dentilled eaves and a tile roof. There are three storeys, nine bays on Barnby Gate, and two on Appleton Gate. In the ground floor are shop fronts and doorways, and the windows are a mix of casements and sashes, and some windows are blocked.	II
14D, E, F and 16 Barnby Gate; 53.07552°N 0.80648°W	—	Late 18th century	Two houses, later two shops and flats, in brick, the right return rendered, on a plinth, with a floor band, dentilled eaves and a pantile roof. There are two storeys, and an L-shaped plan, with a front range of four bays. In the ground floor are two shop windows with pilasters and cornices, and to the right of each is a doorway with a fanlight. The upper floor contains sash windows.	II
4–10 Bridge Street; 53.07591°N 0.80809°W		Late 18th century	Four houses, later shops, in yellow brick with stone dressings, a floor band, a moulded cornice, a coped parapet and a slate roof. There are three storeys and attics, and ten bays, with five bays projecting slightly. The middle shop front is stone-clad with round-arched recesses, the right shop has a rendered front with three round-headed windows, and the left shop front has a recessed door and a fascia. Most of the windows in the upper floors are sashes, and some have been altered.	II
2 Carter Gate and 12–14 Bridge Street; 53.07580°N 0.80784°W	—	Late 18th century	Three houses, later a shop, on a corner site, in brick, the Carter Street front colourwashed, with stone dressings, and ramped coped parapets. There are three storeys, and four bays on each front. The Bridge Street front has floor bands, and sash windows with wedge lintels and keystones. In the ground floor is a shop front with square corner piers, extending round the corner, with a recessed doorway and a recessed corner window. The Carter Gate front has a parapet band, and plain sash windows.	II
4–8 Carter Gate; 53.07573°N 0.80798°W	—	Late 18th century	Three houses, later two shops, in brick, with dentilled eaves and a pantile roof. There are three storeys and seven bays. In the ground floor are two 20th-century shop fronts under a continuous fascia. The upper floors contain sash windows alternating with blank windows, all with segmental heads.	II
3 and 5 Castlegate; 53.07809°N 0.81037°W		Late 18th century	Two houses later used for other purposes on a corner site, in brick with roofs of pantile and slate. No. 3 on the corner has double rebated eaves a hipped roof, three storeys and a front of four bays. In the ground floor is a shop front with a cornice on brackets, and the upper floor contains sash windows with rubbed brick heads. No. 5 to the right is lower and has three storeys and three bays. In the ground floor is a doorway with a fanlight and a pediment, and above are sash windows with segmental heads. The front on Kirkgate has a plinth a floor band, a garage door and shop windows with cornices. Beyond is a former warehouse with three storeys and three bays containing hoist doors.	II
9 Castlegate; 53.07790°N 0.81066°W		Late 18th century	A house, later a shop, in colourwashed brick, the ground floor rendered, on a plinth, with stone dressings, a floor band, rebated eaves and a slate roof. There are three storeys and four bays. In the ground floor are two shop windows, one bowed, and a doorway with a fanlight. The windows are sashes, those in the upper two floors with splayed lintels.	II
13 and 15 Castlegate; 53.07767°N 0.81092°W		Late 18th century	Two houses, later a house and a restaurant, in brick on a plinth, with floor bands, modillion eaves and a slate roof. There are three storeys and six bays. In the ground floor is a 19th-century shop front with a cornice on brackets, to its right is a carriage entrance, and to the left is a doorway with a moulded surround and a fanlight. The windows are sashes, most with rubbed brick heads, and the windows in the right bay are smaller, with segmental heads.	II
14 and 16 Castlegate; 53.07683°N 0.81263°W		Late 18th century	A pair of houses later used for other purposes, in brick, with stone dressings, floor bands, and a slate roof with coped gables. There are three storeys, eight bays, and a rear wing. On the front are two doorways with moulded surrounds and fanlights, the right doorway flanked by large bow windows. The other windows on the front are sashes. The left return contains a doorway with a plain surround and casement windows, and the right corner is chamfered and contains sash windows under an arched brick canopy.	II
22 and 24 Castlegate; 53.07656°N 0.81309°W		Late 18th century	Two houses, later offices, in brick, with stone dressings, a floor band, dentilled eaves, and a pantile roof with coped gables. There are three storeys and seven bays. The doorway has a fanlight and a hood on curved brackets, to the left is a round-headed entry, and on the right is an elliptical-headed carriage entrance, now glazed. The windows are sashes with segmental heads.	II
27 and 29 Castlegate; 53.07706°N 0.81176°W	—	Late 18th century	A house, later an office, in brick, with stone dressings, a corner pilaster on the right, a wooden floor band, modillion eaves and a slate roof. There are three storeys and three bays. In the centre is a shop window, to the left is a doorway with a roughcast surround, and to the right is a round-headed entry with imposts. The upper floors contain sash window with flat heads.	II
39 and 41 Castlegate; 53.07651°N 0.81270°W	—	Late 18th century	Two houses on a corner site, later shops and flats, in brick, the left return colourwashed, with stone dressings, floor bands, moulded dentilled eaves and a slate roof. There are three storeys, and front of three bays. In the ground floor is a central doorway with a reeded surround, a fanlight, and a dentilled cornice on curved brackets. To its right is a shop front with a cornice, and to the left is a shop front with rusticated stucco, a decorative cornice, and a doorway, angled in the corner, with pilasters. The upper floors contain sash windows. The left return contains a shop window and a large window above.	II
55 Castlegate; 53.07627°N 0.81303°W		Late 18th century	A house, later a shop, in brick, with stone dressings, a floor band, a moulded eaves cornice and a slate roof. There are three storeys and three bays. In the ground floor is a late 19th-century shop front with pilasters, a cornice and a central recessed doorway, and to its right is an elliptical-arched entry. The upper floors contain sash windows, the central one in the top floor blank, all with multi-keystoned lintels.	II
64 Castlegate; 53.07594°N 0.81405°W		Late 18th century	A brick house with stone dressings, a sill band, bracketed gutters, and a pantile roof with coped gables. There are three storeys and two bays. In the ground floor is a doorway with a fanlight, the windows are sashes, and all the openings have segmental heads.	II
66, 68 and 68A Castlegate; 53.07589°N 0.81414°W		Late 18th century	Two houses, later used for other purposes, in brick, with dentilled eaves, bracketed gutters, and a pantile roof with a single coped gable. There are two storeys and attics, six bays, and a rear wing. In the ground floor is a late 19th-century shop front, to its left is a round-arched entry, and to the right are two sash windows and a segmental-headed doorway with a fanlight. The upper floor contains five sash windows and one blind window; all the windows have segmental heads. In the attic are three gabled dormers with bargeboards.	II
7 Chain Lane; 53.07671°N 0.80989°W		Late 18th century	Three houses, then a public house, and later a shop, in colourwashed brick with pantile roofs. The main block has a floor band, rebated eaves, three storeys and five bays. In the ground floor are shop fronts with bow windows and recessed doorways. To the left is a block with dentilled eaves, two storeys and two bays, and on the right is a two-storey single-bay extension. The windows are sashes, some with segmental heads.	II
3A, 3B and 4 Guildhall Street; 53.07506°N 0.80549°W		Late 18th century	Two brick houses with dentilled eaves and a pantile roof. There are two storeys and three bays. In the ground floor is a shop window with a panelled surround and a cornice, two doorways with segmental heads and ogee-headed bootscrapers, and to the left is a flat-headed doorway. The other windows are horizontally-sliding sashes with segmental heads.	II
9 and 11 Kirkgate; 53.07808°N 0.81005°W	—	Late 18th century	Two houses converted for other uses, in brick, with a floor band, dentilled eaves, and a pantile roof with a coped gable. There are two storeys and attics, and two bays. In the ground floor are two late 19th-century shop fronts, the left with pilasters, a fascia cornice on curved brackets, and a doorway with a fanlight. The right shop front is plain, and to its right is a round-arched entry. The upper floor contains tripartite sash windows with segmental heads, and in the attic are gabled dormers.	II
20 Kirkgate; 53.07772°N 0.80981°W	—	Late 18th century	A house, later a shop, in brick, colourwashed at the front, with rebated eaves and a pantile roof. There are three storeys and a single bay. In the ground floor is a shop front with pilasters. In the middle floor is a sash window with a segmental head, and the top floor contains two casement windows, one smaller to the left.	II
23 and 25 Kirkgate; 53.07770°N 0.80957°W	—	Late 18th century	Two houses, later a shop, in brick with stone dressings, a floor band, cogged and dentilled eaves and a slate roof. There are three storeys and five bays. In the ground floor is a faience shop front with pilasters and a cornice, a recessed central doorway, and double windows with overlights under a 1989 fascia, and to the right is s blocked entry with a faience lintel and parapet. The upper storeys contain sash windows, those in the middle floor with segmental heads.	II
31 Kirkgate; 53.07754°N 0.80939°W		Late 18th century	A house, later a shop, with three cottages at the rear. The shop is in brick, with the front colourwashed, the left gable rendered, and a pantile roof. There are three storeys and two bays, and a rear wing with two storeys and attics. In the ground floor is a late 19th-century shop front with pilasters, a splayed central doorway and a cornice, and the upper floors contain sash windows. In the rear wing the windows have segmental heads, and there is a gabled dormer. The cottages are in brick with a hipped pantile roof, two storeys and six bays. Most of the windows are horizontally-sliding sashes, and the ground floor openings have segmental heads.	II
8, 8A and 8B Lombard Street; 53.07480°N 0.80978°W	—	Late 18th century	A house on a corner site, later a shop and flats, in colourwashed stuccoed brick, with moulded dentilled eaves, and a pantile roof with coped gables. There are three storeys and two bays. In the ground floor is a shop front continued round the corner, with pilasters, a doorway in the angle, and a continuous corniced fascia. The windows in the upper floors are sashes.	II
10 Lombard Street; 53.07485°N 0.80999°W		Late 18th century	A house, later offices, in brick, with floor bands, moulded eaves, and a slate roof with coped gables. There are three storeys, and an L-shaped plan with a front range of five bays. The central doorway has plain jambs, a fanlight and an open pediment on brackets, and to the right is a round-headed boot scraper. The windows are a mix of sashes and casements, all with segmental heads.	II
12 Lombard Street; 53.07493°N 0.81037°W	—	Late 18th century	A public house, later offices, the building is in brick on a plinth, with a floor band, rebated eaves, and a pantile roof with coped gables. There are three storeys and three bays. The central doorway has a segmental head and a fanlight. The ground floor windows are three-light casements, in the floors above are sash windows, and the windows in the lower two floors have segmental heads.	II
12 and 14 London Road; 53.07359°N 0.80921°W		Late 18th century	Two houses converted into offices, in brick with stone dressings and slate roofs. No. 12 on the right has four storeys and five bays, and a two-storey rear wing. It contains floor bands, and rebated eaves. The central doorway has a reeded surround, a fanlight, and an open pediment on brackets, and is flanked by round-headed boot scrapers. The windows are sashes, some with segmental heads, and all with rubbed brick heads. No. 14 has three storeys and two bays, a plinth, a doorway with a reeded surround and an open pediment on curved brackets. To its left is a canted bay window, and the other windows are sashes with rubbed brick heads.	II
15–21 London Road; 53.07404°N 0.80929°W		Late 18th century	A row of four brick houses with rebated eaves and a pantile roof, hipped on the right, and with a coped gable on the left. The doorways are in pairs, and have moulded surrounds, fanlights, and segmental heads. Above each doorway is a blank window, and the other windows are sashes, those in the ground floor with segmental heads.	II
19 Market Place; 53.07643°N 0.80853°W		Late 18th century	A house, later an office, in brick with stone dressings, a sill band, and a tile roof with a coped gable. There are four storeys and two bays. In the ground floor is a shop front with a continuous fascia, and the upper floors contain sash windows with multiple keystones.	II
4 and 6 Middlegate; 53.07757°N 0.80986°W	—	Late 18th century	A house, later a shop, in brick, with stone dressings, and a pantile roof with coped gables. There are three storeys and three bays. In the ground floor is a late 19th-century shop front with pilasters, a cornice on domed curved brackets, and a splayed recessed doorway on the left. Further to the left is a carriage entry with rendered pilasters. The middle floor contains sash windows, and in the top floor are tilting casement windows.	II
32, 32A and 34 Middlegate; 53.07675°N 0.81084°W	—	Late 18th century	Two houses, later a shop, in brick with stone dressings, dentilled eaves, and a slate roof with a single coped gable. There are three storeys and three bays. In the ground floor is a 20th-century shop front with a recessed doorway. The upper floors contain sash windows; the windows in the middle bay are blank.	II
38, 40 and 42 Middlegate; 53.07664°N 0.81095°W	—	Late 18th century	Three houses, later two shops and flats, in brick with stone dressings, dentilled eaves and a pantile roof. There are three storeys and three bays. In the ground floor are two shop fronts, the right one with pilasters, a cornice and a recessed central doorway, and to the left is a smaller shop front with a fascia. The upper floors contain sash windows, those in the outer bays tripartite.	II
5 Millgate; 53.07566°N 0.81427°W		Late 18th century	A brick house on a rendered plinth, with rebated eaves and a pantile roof. There are two storeys and two bays. On the front are a doorway and sash windows, all with segmental heads.	II
25 Millgate; 53.07518°N 0.81489°W	—	Late 18th century	A brick shop that has a pantile roof with a coped roof. It is in one and two storeys, with a single bay facing the street, and is three bays deep. On the street face is a 19th-century shop front that has a doorway with a fanlight and a six-pane widow to the right. The left return contains a door, two sash windows and a garage door.	II
27 Millgate; 53.07518°N 0.81502°W		Late 18th century	A brick house on a plinth, with stone dressings, a floor band, dentilled eaves, and a pantile roof with coped gables. There are three storeys and a cellar, and three bays. In the left bay is a bow window over a three-light cellar opening, and the right bay contains a segmental-headed carriage opening. The middle bay has a blocked opening in each floor. In the outer bays of the upper floors are segmental-headed sash windows.	II
26 and 28 Millgate; 53.07522°N 0.81524°W	—	Late 18th century	Two houses, later three, in brick, with stone dressings, and a slate roof with coped gables. There are two storeys and attics, and an L-shaped plan, with a front range of five bays and a rear wing. In the centre are paired doorways in Classical style with fanlights and cornices, and adjacent round-headed bootscrapers. The windows on the front are sashes with segmental heads, and in the gables are segmental-headed casement windows. The rear wing has rebated eaves, and at the end is a single-storey lean-to that has a doorway with an elliptical head.	II
30 and 32 Millgate; 53.07506°N 0.81547°W		Late 18th century	Two houses, later combined, in brick, on a rendered plinth, with floor bands, dentilled eaves and a hipped pantile roof. There are three storeys and four bays. On the front are two doorways, and the windows are horizontally-sliding sashes, those in the lower two floors with segmental heads.	II
50 Millgate; 53.07459°N 0.81629°W	—	Late 18th century	A house in brick on a plinth, with floor bands, rebated eaves, and a pantile roof with coped gables. There are two storeys and attics, and an L-shaped plan, with a front range of six bays and a rear wing. The doorway in the right bay has a fanlight, the windows are sashes with elliptical heads, there are similar blank windows, and in the attic are blank panels and two sloping dormers. In the rear wing are casement windows.	II
52 and 54 Millgate; 53.07449°N 0.81644°W		Late 18th century	A house and a public house, later two houses, in brick on a plinth, with stone dressings, a floor band, dentilled eaves, a gable band, and a pantile roof. There are two storeys and attics, and a front of six bays. The right house has a central doorway with a fanlight flanked by metal casement windows. The central doorway in the left house has a fanlight and a segmental head. The other windows are sashes with segmental heads, and in the attics are four sloping dormers. In the left corner is an angled doorway.	II
69 and 71 Millgate; 53.07374°N 0.81727°W		Late 18th century	A pair of houses in brick on a plinth, with a floor band, rebated eaves and a slate roof. There re two storeys and basements, and a symmetrical front of three bays. The middle bay projects slightly, and contains a segmental-arched carriage entrance with a rusticated head and a keystone. Above it is a round-headed recess containing a round-headed sash window. Immediately flanking the archway are doorways with reeded surrounds, fanlights, and open pediments on curved brackets. Outside the left doorway is a sash window, and outside the right doorway is a 20th-century casement window. The outer bays of the upper floor each contains a sash window and a wrought iron balcony. The doorways are approached by curved steps with newels containing bootscrapers, and in front of the houses are brick walls with cast iron railings.	II
78–82 Millgate; 53.07355°N 0.81798°W		Late 18th century	A terrace of brick houses on a plinth, with stone dressings, a floor band, dentilled eaves and a slate roof. There are three storeys and cellars, and nine bays. The doorways have reeded surrounds, a decorated dummy fanlight, an open pediment on curved brackets, and bootscrapers. The cellar lights have segmental heads, and the windows are sashes, some blank, with rubbed brick heads and multiple keystones.	II
93–101 Millgate; 53.07304°N 0.81838°W		Late 18th century	A row of five brick houses with a floor band, rebated eaves and a pantile roof. There are two storeys and five bays. The doorways have segmental heads, one has a round-headed bootscraper, and the windows are sashes, some horizontally-sliding.	II
8–13 Mill Lane; 53.07456°N 0.81675°W		Late 18th century	A terrace of six brick houses with a floor band, dentilled eaves, pantile roofs, and two storeys. The doorways have fanlights and segmental heads, and there is a segmental-arched entry. Most of the windows are sashes, most with segmental arches.	II
1 Navigation Yard; 53.07534°N 0.81520°W	—	Late 18th century	A brick house with rebated eaves and hipped slate and pantile roofs. There are two storeys, an L-shaped plan, and fronts of two bays. Most of the windows are sashes.	II
20, 22 and 24 Northgate; 53.07906°N 0.80911°W		Late 18th century	A row of three brick houses with stone dressings, dentilled eaves, and a pantile roof with coped gables. There are two storeys, five bays, and a rear lean-to. The doorways have segmental heads, fanlights and bootscrapers. The windows in the ground floor are sashes with segmental heads, the upper floor has horizontally-sliding windows with flat heads, and there are blank windows.	II
33 Northgate; 53.07993°N 0.80808°W	—	Late 18th century	A stable and a house, later used for other purposes, at right angles to the road, it is in brick, partly colourwashed, with a hipped pantile roof, and two storeys. On the front facing the road is a 19th-century shop front, with a three-light window and a cornice. To its right is a doorway, and the upper floor contains a sash window.	II
35 Northgate, malthouse, kiln and stable 53.08015°N 0.80842°W		Late 18th century	The house is in brick on a plinth, with a floor band, dentilled eaves and a hipped slate roof. There are three storeys and three bays, the middle bay projecting under a pediment. The central doorway has a moulded surround, a fanlight, and a pediment on scrolled brackets, and is flanked by canted bay windows. To the left is a three-storey extension, and to the right is a two-story hipped wing. The malthouse has two storeys, fronts of eight and three bays, and external stairs. Adjoining it is a former kiln with three storeys, and a hipped pantile roof with two elaborate cowls, and to the left is the former stable.	II
38 Northgate; 53.07941°N 0.80844°W		Late 18th century	A house later used for other purposes, in brick on a plinth, with stone dressings, a floor band, a moulded eaves cornice, a parapet and hipped slate and pantile roofs. The main block has three storeys and three bays, flanked by two-storey wings, and there is a rear wing. In the centre is a Classical doorway with a Gothic fanlight, and an open pediment on scroll brackets. The windows are sashes, those in the right wing with segmental heads. In the rear wing is a two-storey bay window.	II
8 Stodman Street; 53.07645°N 0.81184°W	—	Late 18th century	A house, later a shop, in brick, with floor bands, cogged eaves, and a pantile roof with a single coped gable. There are three storeys and two bays. In the ground floor is a late 19th-century shop front containing a doorway with a fanlight, and to the right is a round-arched entry over which is an inscribed cast iron plate. In the upper floors are casement windows with rendered lintels.	II
29 and 31 Stodman Street; 53.07606°N 0.81051°W	—	Late 18th century	Two houses, later shops, on a corner site, in colourwashed brick with dentilled eaves and a hipped pantile roof. There are three storeys, a front of six bays, and two bays in the right return. The left shop front dates from about 1875, and has pilasters, a cornice on decorative scroll brackets, a cast iron crest, a recessed doorway with a fanlight, and windows with brass mullions and aprons. To the right is a modern shop front with a fascia, and the upper floors contain sash windows, some blank. In the right return, some of the openings have segmental heads.	II
41 and 42 Stodman Street; 53.07631°N 0.81178°W	—	Late 18th century	Two houses, later shops, in brick, with cogged eaves and a pantile roof. There are two storeys and attics and two bays. In the ground floor are two late 19th-century shop fronts, each with a recessed doorway on the left. The upper floor contains a canted bay window on the left and a sash window on the right, and in the attic are two raking dormers.	II
43 Stodman Street; 53.07634°N 0.81190°W	—	Late 18th century	A house, later a shop, with floor bands, dentilled eaves and a slate roof. There are three storeys and three bays. In the ground floor is a full-length shop front, and the in upper floors are sash windows, the middle window in the top floor blind.	II
49 and 50 Stodman Street; 53.07643°N 0.81234°W	—	Late 18th century	Two houses, later shops, in painted brick with dentilled eaves and a pantile roof. There are three storeys and five bays. In the ground floor are two late 19th-century shop fronts under a continuous fascia, the left with a splayed doorway and the other with a recessed door. The upper floors contain sash windows with segmental heads, one blank.	II
51 and 53 Stodman Street; 53.07649°N 0.81253°W	—	Late 18th century	Two houses, later three shops, in colourwashed brick, with rebated eaves, bracketed gutters and a pantile roof. There are four storeys and five bays. In the ground floor are three shop fronts, the right one dating from the late 19th century with a dentilled cornice, and to its right is a small casement window. The upper floors contain sash windows and blank windows, most with segmental heads.	II
Agricultural Travel Bureau; 53.07655°N 0.80974°W	—	Late 18th century	A house, later a shop and offices, in brick, colourwashed on the front, with rebated eaves and a pantile roof. There are three storeys and three bays. The central doorway has a fanlight, and the windows are sashes with segmental heads.	II
Beaumond Cross House; 53.07349°N 0.80907°W	—	Late 18th century	A brick house with floor bands, dentilled eaves and a pyramidal pantile roof. There are three storeys, fronts of two bays, and a rear wing with two storeys, and a slate roof with a coped gable. In the ground floor are four canted bay windows, the one on the front facing the road with a doorway. The other windows are sashes, those in the middle floor of the left return with segmental heads.	II
Former Bowling Green public house 53.08178°N 0.80082°W		Late 18th century	The public house, later used for other purposes, is in painted rendered brick on a plinth, with a floor band, cogged eaves and a slate roof. There are two storeys and six bays. On the front are two doorways with fanlights, the windows are casements, and in the attic are a box dormer and a sloping dormer. To the right is a canted single-storey extension.	II
Cheltermill House; 53.07537°N 0.81243°W		Late 18th century	The house, later offices, is in brick on a plinth, with stone dressings, floor bands, cogged eaves and a slate roof. There are three storeys and four bays, and a later rear wing with two storeys and four bays. The windows are sashes with segmental heads, and in the rear wing is a canted bay window.	II
Former Elmhurst Hotel; 53.07543°N 0.81265°W		Late 18th century	A house, at one time a hotel, in brick on a plinth, with dressings in stone and stucco, floor bands, a moulded eaves cornice, a pediment, and slate roofs. There are three storeys and five bays, and recessed wings with two storeys and three bays. The central doorway has pilasters, a fanlight, and a segmental pediment on scroll brackets. The windows are sashes with rubbed brick heads. The left wing contains a doorway with a round head, in the right wing is a doorway with a flat head and an entry with a round head, and in the upper floors of both wings some windows are blank.	II
Lombard House; 53.07499°N 0.81151°W	—	Late 18th century	A brick house on a plinth, with stone dressings, floor bands, moulded eaves, and a slate roof with coped gables. There are three storeys and five bays. In the right bay is a Classical doorway with a panelled lintel and an open pediment on scroll brackets. On the left is a carriage entrance with a segmental head and a keystone, partly infilled, and containing a door and a window. The other windows are sashes, those in the lower two floors with segmental heads.	II
Former Mail Coach public house 53.07416°N 0.80948°W		Late 18th century	The former public house is in brick, the front in colourwashed stucco, on a plinth, with wooden gutters on brackets, and pantile roofs with coped gables. There are two storeys and attics, and a U-shaped plan around a back yard, with a front range of five bays, and a rear wing with two storeys and four bays. In the centre is a segmental-headed opening with graduated round windows above, the windows are sashes with segmental heads, and there are three segmental-headed dormers.	II
Millgate House Hotel and wall 53.07434°N 0.81632°W		Late 18th century	A house, later a hotel, in brick on a plinth, with dressings in stone and stucco, rebated eaves and a slate roof. There are two storeys and attics, and a main range of three bays. Steps lead to the central doorway that has a reeded surround, a fanlight, and an open pediment on curved brackets. The windows are sashes with splayed lintels. To the right are two later extensions, in the left return is a bow window, and to the left is a further extension linked by a corridor. The boundary wall is in brick with stone coping, containing square piers, one pair with pyramidal caps.	II
Northgate House and wall 53.07880°N 0.80917°W		Late 18th century	The house is in brick, with dressings in stone and stucco, floor bands, a modillion eaves cornice, and a parapet with five blind panels. The main block has three storeys and a basement, and five bays. Steps lead up to the central doorway that has a moulded surround and a hood on consoles. The windows, which are sashes, and the doorway, have multi-keystoned lintels. To the left is a single-storey extension with a ramped coped gable, and behind it is a three-storey three-bay addition. To the northeast of the house is a brick wall with ramped stone coping extending for about 25 metres (82 ft).	II
Ram Hotel; 53.07744°N 0.81123°W		Late 18th century	The hotel, which incorporates earlier material, is in brick on a plinth, with floor bands, rebated and cogged eaves, bracketed gutters, and a tile roof with coped gables. There are three storeys and seven bays, and a rear wing. The doorway has a hood, and the windows are a mix of sashes and casements, those in the lower two floors with keystones. The rear wing has a tile roof, two storeys and attics and six bays, and in the attic are dormers. Beyond this is a two-storey range with six bays, and a further two-storey range with two bays.	II
Rutland Arms Hotel; 53.07580°N 0.80697°W		Late 18th century	The hotel is in brick on a plinth, the ground floor rendered and colourwashed, with a lintel band, a cornice, boxed eaves, and a roof of pantile and stone slate. There are three storeys, an L-shaped plan, and a front range of six bays. The doorway has a moulded shouldered architrave, and is flanked by sash windows with moulded surrounds. To the right is an elliptical-arched carriage entrance with a rusticated surround and a keystone, and further to the right is a shop front with shaped pilasters and a corniced fascia. The upper floors contain sash windows with rubbed brick heads.	II
Former White Hind public house 53.07563°N 0.80784°W		Late 18th century	The public house, on a corner site, is in colourwashed brick with floor bands, modillion eaves and a slate roof. The main block has three storeys and four bays, and contains a doorway and casement windows in the ground floor and sash windows above, all with segmental heads. To the left, on the corner, is a two-storey wing with one bay on each front and an angled doorway on the corner.	II
The White House, outbuildings, wall and railing 53.07325°N 0.81848°W		Late 18th century	The house, later divided into flats, is in colourwashed roughcast brick with slate roofs. There are two storeys and two main blocks, an L-shaped plan, and the windows are a mix of sashes and casements. On the river front is a bow window with Doric columns, and a French window with a fanlight. The right return contains a double coped gable, a canted two-storey bay window and a stair window, and there is a similar bay window on the road front. On each side of the house is a single-storey outbuilding. Along the road is a spearhead railing on a rendered plinth, and square piers with pyramidal caps, and on the southwest side is a brick boundary wall with gabled brick and stone coping.	II
Former Trustee Savings Bank; 53.07603°N 0.81020°W	—	Late 18th century	Two houses, later a bank, it was refronted in 1969. The front is stuccoed, on a plinth, with stone dressings, corner pilasters, an eaves cornice, and a slate roof. There are three storeys and five bays. In the ground floor is a shop front with pilasters, containing a recessed doorway with a fanlight, and a cornice on fluted brackets. The upper floors contain sash windows with moulded surrounds, those in the middle floor with keystones and bracketed sills, and in the top floor with cornices and aprons.	II
Warehouse at rear of 7 Bargate ((northwest); 53.07866°N 0.81051°W	—	Late 18th century	The warehouse is in brick on a rendered plinth, with dentilled eaves and a tile roof. There are two storeys and four bays. In the ground floor is a doorway with a segmental arch, and the windows are a mix of casements and horizontally-sliding sashes, those in the ground floor with segmental heads.	II
3 Middlegate; 53.07743°N 0.80980°W		c. 1780	A house, later offices, in brick, the right gable rendered, on a plinth with floor bands, modillion eaves and a roof of tile and pantile. There are three storeys and five bays, the middle three bays projecting under a modillion pediment. In the centre is a Doric doorway with an entablature, a fanlight and a dentilled pediment. The windows in the lower two floors are sashes, and in the top floor are tilting casements. To the right is a lower wing with two storeys and two bays, containing sash windows.	II
23 and 23A Millgate; 53.07528°N 0.81479°W		c. 1780	A house, later offices, in brick on a plinth, with stone dressings, a floor band, moulded wooden eaves, and a pantile roof with coped gables and kneelers. There are three storeys and an L-shaped plan, with a front range of five bays and a rear wing. Steps lead up to the central doorway that has Doric piers, a fanlight, and a dentilled open pediment. The windows on the front are sashes with rubbed brick heads. In the rear wing is a doorway and sash windows, some of which have segmental heads.	II
33 and 35 Portland Street; 53.07358°N 0.81199°W	—	c. 1780	A pair of brick houses with dentilled eaves and a pantile roof. There are three storeys and three bays. In the centre are paired doorways with fanlights. The windows are sashes, those in the middle bay are dummies. All the openings have segmental heads.	II
Former slaughterhouse and cattle stall 53.07598°N 0.81433°W	—	c. 1780	The building is in brick with a rendered south gable, a louvred clerestory, rebated eaves, pantile roofs, and a single storey. In the centre is a round-arched doorway, a window and a blocked opening. To the left is a lean-to cattle stall, and a smaller lean-to further to the left.	II
37–43 Portland Street; 53.07354°N 0.81210°W		c. 1785	A terrace of five brick houses, with dressings in stone and stucco, dentilled eaves, and pantile roofs. There are three storeys and six bays. The doorway in the right bay has a segmental head, and the others have multi-keystoned lintels. Most of the windows are sashes, and there are some casement windows and dummy windows. Two of the windows have segmental heads and the others have multi-keystoned lintels.	II
Former Methodist Chapel; 53.07487°N 0.80612°W		1787	The chapel, later used for other purposes, is in brick on a stone plinth, with cogged eaves and a hipped pantile roof. There are two storeys and fronts of four and seven bays, and a projecting single-storey wing on the right. The doorway has a round-arched head and a fanlight, and to its right is a round-arched window. The other windows are sashes with segmental heads.	II
6 and 8 Portland Street; 53.07401°N 0.81127°W	—	c. 1790	A row of three houses later used for other purposes, in brick with a pantile roof. There are two storeys and five bays. On the front are three doorways, a shop window, and casement windows. The upper floor contains casement windows with one, two or three lights.	II
Brunswick House; 53.07214°N 0.81665°W		c. 1790	A brick house with stucco dressings, a painted floor band, a coped parapet and a slate roof. There are two storeys and three bays. In the centre is a canted rusticated porch with concave sides and a coped parapet containing a doorway with a fanlight. Above the porch is a French window, and the other windows are sashes with multi-keystoned lintels.	II
6 Appleton Gate; 53.07607°N 0.80728°W		c. 1800	A public house in rendered brick, with rusticated quoins, dentilled eaves and a pantile roof. There are three storeys and two bays. In the ground floor is a full-width shop front with a continuous fascia, and a splayed doorway. The upper floors contain casement windows.	II
15–19 Appleton Gate; 53.07678°N 0.80665°W	—	c. 1800	Three houses, later used for other purposes, in brick with stone dressings, dentilled eaves, and a tile roof with a coped gable. There are three storeys and five bays. In the left bay of the ground floor is a shop front with a central splayed doorway. To its right is an entry, and the other bays contain a 19th-century shop front with reeded pilasters, paterae, a continuous fascia on decorative brackets, and a splayed central doorway with a fanlight. In the upper floor, the left bay contains casement windows, and in the other bays are sash windows, all with segmental heads.	II
21 Appleton Gate; 53.07686°N 0.80660°W	—	c. 1800	A house and a shop on a corner site, in brick with stone dressings, dentilled eaves, and a slate roof with coped gables. There are three storeys and an L-shaped plan, with a front range of three bays and a rear wing. In the ground floor is a shop front with a rendered surround, a splayed doorway and a continuous fascia. In the upper floors are sash windows with rubbed brick heads. The rear wing is colourwashed, and has a floor band, and cogged and dentilled eaves. It contains a doorway with a fanlight, sash windows with segmental heads, casement windows, and a gabled dormer.	II
47 and 48 Appleton Gate; 53.07768°N 0.80562°W		c. 1800	A cottage and a coach house converted into two houses, in brick, rendered on the front, with stone dressings, rebated eaves, a tile roof, and two storeys. The left part of the front facing the street is blank, to the right is a segmental-headed doorway with a fanlight, a small casement window above it, and sash windows further to the right. At the rear are two elliptical-headed carriage entrances with keystones, a garage door, a blocked pitching hole, a casement window and a hatch.	II
46 Barnby Gate; 53.07513°N 0.80524°W	—	c. 1800	A house and former shop in brick, with dentilled eaves and a pantile roof. There are two storeys and two bays. The doorway has a segmental head and an ogee-headed bootscraper, and to its right is a shop window with pilasters and a cornice. The other windows are sashes with segmental heads.	II
29 Carter Gate; 53.07480°N 0.80890°W		c. 1800	A house, later an office, in brick with stone dressings and a pantile roof. There are three storeys and three bays. Steps lead up to a doorway that has a fanlight, a hood on scroll brackets and flanking bootscrapers. To its left is a recessed shop front, and the upper floors contain sash windows, the middle one in the top floor blank.	II
33 Castlegate; 53.07691°N 0.81200°W	—	c. 1800	A house, later a shop, in brick, with dentilled eaves, and a slate roof with a single coped gable. There are three storeys and three bays. In the ground floor is a shop front with a recessed doorway and a full-width fascia, and to the right is a carriage entry. The upper floors contain sash windows; those in the outer bays are tripartite.	II
43–47 and 51 Castlegate; 53.07640°N 0.81289°W	—	c. 1800	A row of four houses, later used for other purposes, in brick, on a partial plinth, with floor bands, dentilled eaves, and roofs of pantile and slate with a single coped gable. There are three storeys and attics, and eight bays. In the centre of the ground floor is a round-arched entry, flanked by a variety of shop fronts. The upper floors contain windows, mainly sashes, some horizontally-sliding, some with segmental heads, some are blank, there are casements, and in the attic are dormers.	II
2 Guildhall Street; 53.07515°N 0.80545°W	—	c. 1800	A brick house with a pantile roof, two storeys and a single bay. The doorway and the windows, which are horizontally-sliding sashes, all with segmental heads.	II
2–10 King Street; 53.07255°N 0.81816°W	—	c. 1800	A terrace of five houses in brick with dressings in stone and stucco, rebated eaves and a pantile roof. There are two storeys and five bays. The doorways have plain jambs and fanlights, most of the windows are sashes, and all the openings have multi-keystoned lintels.	II
12 and 14 King Street; 53.07244°N 0.81793°W	—	c. 1800	A pair of houses in brick, with stucco dressings, a floor band, dentilled eaves and a pantile roof. There are two storeys, and a symmetrical front of four bays. In the outer bays are round-headed entries. Inside these are doorways, the windows are sash windows, and all these openings have wedge lintels and keystones.	II
29 and 31 King Street; 53.07236°N 0.81741°W	—	c. 1800	A pair of houses in brick with stucco dressings and a pantile roof. There are two storeys and two bays. The doorways have fanlights and ogee-headed bootscrapers, the windows are sashes, and all the openings have multi-keystoned lintels.	II
16 Kirkgate; 53.07782°N 0.80996°W	—	c. 1800	A house, later a shop, in brick, the front colourwashed, with dentilled eaves and a pantile roof. There are three storeys and a single bay. In the ground floor is a shop front with a panelled stall board, pilasters and a cornice. To its right is a round-arched entry, and the upper floors contain sash windows with segmental heads.	II
85 Millgate; 53.07330°N 0.81800°W	—	c. 1800	A house and a shop on a corner site, in brick with stucco dressings, cogged eaves and a tile roof. There are two storeys, four bays on Millgate, and two on Parliament Street. Extending round the corner is a shop front with pilasters, a continuous cornice, and a doorway in the angle. To the right is a doorway with a fanlight, and a bootscraper with a pointed head. The windows on the front are sashes; they and the doorway have lintels with keystones. To the right is a former stable with two storeys and three bays, containing sash windows with segmental heads and an altered pair of carriage doors.	II
Former stable range, 109 Millgate; 53.07247°N 0.81900°W	—	c. 1800	The stable range, later used for other purposes, is in brick with stone dressings, a floor band, and a pantile roof with coped gables. It is in one and two storeys, with an L-shaped plan, a front range of three bays, a lean-to on the left, and a single-storey five-bay rear wing. In the front are windows with segmental heads, those in the upper floor with keystones.	II
23 and 25 Pelham Street; 53.07373°N 0.81378°W	—	c. 1800	A pair of houses in brick, with stone dressings, cogged eaves and a pantile roof. There are two storeys and cellars, and three bays. In the centre is a round-arched doorway with a blocked fanlight, the windows are sashes with segmental heads, and there are two segment-headed cellar lights.	II
1A Town Wharf; 53.07878°N 0.81031°W	—	c. 1800	The house is in brick with stone sills, rebated eaves, a bracketed gutter and a tile roof. There are two storeys and three bays. In the ground floor is a round arch containing a recessed doorway with a fanlight and sidelights, to its left are two segment-headed sash windows and a flat-headed entry. The upper floor contains a blank window flanked by casements, all with segmental heads.	II
1 and 3 Victoria Street; 53.07337°N 0.81249°W		c. 1800	A pair of houses in red brick on a plinth, with floor bands, moulded eaves and a hipped pantile roof. There are three storeys, a U-shaped plan, and a front of five bays. The round-arched doorways have fluted surrounds, fanlights with Gothic glazing, and open pediments on scrolled brackets with lions' heads. The windows are sashes.	II
64–70 Victoria Street; 53.07225°N 0.81633°W		c. 1800	A row of four brick houses with stucco dressings, a floor band and a pantile roof. There are two storeys and four bays. The doorways have reeded surrounds, fanlights, and open pediments on curved brackets. The windows are sashes with splayed lintels, the middle window in the upper floor is blank, and in the right return is an oriel bow window.	II
72 and 74 Victoria Street; 53.07214°N 0.81645°W		c. 1800	A brick house on a plinth, partly rendered, with dressings in stone and stucco, sill bands, and a roof of pantile and tile. There are three storeys and three bays. In the centre is a round-headed entry with imposts, a keystone, and a decorated fanlight. This is flanked by doorways, each with a reeded surround, a fanlight, and an open pediment on curved brackets. Most of the windows are sashes, those in the middle bay blank, and all with multi-keystoned lintels.	II
Former Castle Cycles; 53.07710°N 0.81102°W		c. 1800	A shop with a former warehouse at the rear in brick, on a plinth, with floor bands, dentilled eaves and hipped pantile roofs. The shop has three storeys and two bays. In the ground floor is a full-width late 19th-century shop front with pilasters, a bracketed cornice and a central splayed doorway. The upper floors contain sash windows. The warehouse at the rear has two storeys and external steps, and contains various openings.	II
Jalland's Row (northeast side); 53.07757°N 0.80637°W	—	c. 1800	A row of four brick cottages with pantile roofs. There are two storeys and nine bays. Most of the windows are horizontally-sliding sashes, there are some casement windows, and the ground floor openings have segmental heads. The backs are blind.	II
Jalland's Row (southwest side); 53.07749°N 0.80639°W	—	c. 1800	A row of seven brick cottages with dentilled eaves and pantile roofs. There are two storeys and 13 bays. Most of the windows are horizontally-sliding sashes, there are some casement windows, and the ground floor openings have segmental heads. The backs are blind.	II
Former King's Arms public house 53.07229°N 0.81725°W	—	c. 1800	A public house and a shop, later two houses, in brick, with stone dressings and a pantile roof. There are two storeys and attics, and three bays. To the right is a late 19th-century shop front with a cornice, a three-light mullioned window, and a doorway with a fanlight and a bootscraper with a pointed head. The windows on the front are sashes with multi-keystoned lintels, and in the left return the windows have segmental heads.	II
Millbank and walls 53.07257°N 0.81876°W	—	c. 1800	A house, later offices, in brick on a plinth, with stone dressings, corner pilasters, moulded eaves, and a tile roof. There are two storeys and attics, and three bays, the middle bay projecting slightly. In the centre is a doorway in Classical style, with a fanlight and a cornice. The windows are sashes with splayed lintels and keystones, and in the attic are two gabled dormers. The boundary wall is in brick with painted coping, containing four square piers with stepped caps. To the left is a higher garden wall with gabled blue brick coping.	II
Tadorna; 53.07572°N 0.80232°W	—	c. 1800	A house and a former stable in stucco and brick on a plinth, with stone dressings, deep eaves, hipped slate roofs, and two storeys. The house has five bays, a central doorway with a fanlight and a hood on scroll brackets, sash windows with shutters, and a canted bay window. The stable range has five bays, and contains sash and casement windows, and two pairs of garage doors.	II
The Firs; 53.06713°N 0.83180°W	—	c. 1800	A house in painted brick with stone dressings and a hipped tile roof. There are two storeys and three bays. The central doorway has a fanlight, and a hood on scroll brackets, and the windows are sashes.	II
Former toll house and railing 53.07825°N 0.81227°W		c. 1800	The toll house, which was later extended, is in brick on a plinth, with stone dressings, and roofs of pantile and slate, with coped gables, crowstepped at the rear. There are two storeys and attics, a double depth plan, and a front range of three bays. In the centre is a doorway with a fanlight, and a hood on scroll brackets, and the windows are sashes with segmental heads. To the left is a single-storey extension containing a doorway with a moulded surround and a hood mould. Along the front are cast iron railings on a stone plinth with chamfered coping, containing two gateways.	II
Orchard House; 53.07092°N 0.82096°W		1806	A brick house on a plinth, with stone dressings, a floor band, moulded eaves, a low parapet and a slate roof. There are three storeys and three bays. The central doorway has a panelled recess, a fanlight, and a pediment on brackets decorated with feathers. The windows are sashes with rubbed brick segmental heads.	II
Bowling Club House; 53.07233°N 0.80995°W		1809	The club house is in brick on a plinth, with stone dressings, a sill band, and a roof in slate and pantile, the gables coped, and embattled at the front. There are two storeys and four bays, the middle two bays projecting under a pediment containing the date in Roman numerals. The doorways, and the windows, which are sashes, have pointed heads and keystones. In front is a balcony on reeded iron posts with a cast iron railing and an inscribed motto.	II
Longstone Bridge; 53.07452°N 0.81852°W		1819	The bridge carries a towpath over a side channel of the River Trent. It is in stone, and consists of seven segmental arches with keystones. It has solid coping walls with splayed ends, and a cobbled surface.	II
13 King Street; 53.07260°N 0.81791°W	—	c. 1820	A brick house, the left gable rendered and colourwashed, with a pantile roof. There are two storeys and two bays. In the centre is a doorway, the windows are sashes, and all the openings have segmental heads.	II
15, 17 and 19 King Street; 53.07254°N 0.81777°W	—	c. 1820	Three houses incorporating a former shop, in brick with stone dressings, cogged eaves and a slate roof. There are two storeys and four bays. In the ground floor are three doorways with splayed lintels. One shop window with a reeded surround remains on the right, and the other windows are sashes with splayed lintels. In the right gable end are two doorways with segmental heads.	II
37 and 39 King Street; 53.07222°N 0.81716°W	—	c. 1820	A pair of brick houses with dressings in stone and stucco and a pantile roof. There are two storeys and three bays. In the centre is an elliptical-arched carriage entrance. This is flanked by doorways with fanlights, and bootscrapers with pointed heads. The windows are sashes, and the doorways and windows have splayed lintels.	II
87–91 Millgate; 53.07315°N 0.81824°W		c. 1820	A terrace of three houses in brick with stucco dressings and a pantile roof. There are three storeys and four bays. In the ground floor are three doorways with fanlights, two with bootscrapers, and an entry. The windows are sashes, one blank, and all the openings have wedge lintels and keystones. Above the entry is an inscribed cast iron plate.	II
62 Victoria Street; 53.07233°N 0.81599°W		c. 1820	A house and a shop on a corner site in brick, with brick pilasters and a pantile roof. There are two storeys, four bays on Victoria Street, a rounded bay on the corner, and on Parliament Street are two bays and a recessed bay on the left. In the corner bay is a rounded doorway with a fanlight, above which is a rounded sash window. On Victoria Street is a doorway with a fanlight, to its left is a shop window, and the other windows are sashes. The Parliament street has a shop window and sashes, and in the recessed bay is a round-headed entry with imposts and a blank fanlight. The windows have multi-keystoned lintels.	II
Beacon Hill Tollhouse; 53.07635°N 0.79490°W	—	c. 1820	The former toll house is in brick on a rendered plinth, with stone dressings, deep eaves on shaped brackets, and a slate roof with kneelers. There is a single storey, and a cruciform plan with three bays. On the front is a gable, a segmental-headed window and a doorway, and the left return has a gable and two round-headed windows.	II
Newark Antiques Centre; 53.07576°N 0.81213°W		1820	A Congregational church converted for other purposes, it is in brick with dressings in painted brick and stone and a slate roof. There are two storeys, three bays on the front and five on the sides. On the front are pilasters, a floor band and a pediment containing a blank circle. In each outer bay is a porch with a pediment, and the windows are cross-casements, with a segmental arch in the ground floor and round-headed arches above. Along the sides are round-arched recesses containing windows with round arches in the upper floor, and segmental arches below.	II
42 and 44 Barnby Gate; 53.07517°N 0.80537°W		1824	Two houses, later a house and a shop, in brick, partly colourwashed, with dentilled eaves and a pantile roof. There are three storeys and four bays. In the centre is a round-headed entry, above which is a datestone. To the right is a doorway flanked by shop windows, the right window with a reeded surround and a cornice, and to the left is a segmental-headed doorway. The windows in the outer bays are horizontally-sliding sashes, and in the inner bays are smaller casements.	II
21, 23, 25 and 27 King Street; 53.07243°N 0.81755°W	—	c. 1825	A terrace of four brick houses, the left gable rendered, with cogged eaves and a slate roof. There are two storeys and four bays. The doorways and the windows, most of which are sashes, have splayed lintels.	II
40 and 42 Parliament Street; 53.07258°N 0.81677°W	—	c. 1825	A pair of brick houses at the end of a terrace, with stone dressings, rebated eaves and a pantile roof. There are two storeys and three bays. In the centre is a round-arched entry flanked by doorways with fanlights, segmental heads and round-headed bootscrapers. The windows are sashes, also with segmental heads.	II
7–11 Albert Street; 53.07355°N 0.81076°W		Early 19th century	A row of three brick houses with stone dressings, dentilled eaves and pantile roofs. There are two storeys and seven bays. To the left is a doorway with a moulded surround, a fanlight and a small hood, the other two doorways have segmental heads, between these is a round-arched entry, and all the doorways have bootscrapers. The windows are sashes, those in the ground floor with segmental heads.	II
13–17 Albert Street and 1 Albion Street; 53.07344°N 0.81088°W		Early 19th century	A group of houses on a corner site, in brick, with cogged eaves and pantile roofs. There are two storeys, five bays on Albert Street, and two on Albion Street. The doorways have fanlights, the windows are a mix of sashes and casements, and all the ground floor openings have segmental heads. On Albert Street are two ogee-headed bootscrapers.	II
1A and 3 Appleton Gate; 53.07606°N 0.80757°W		Early 19th century	Two houses, later shops, stuccoed, with a lintel band, a parapet, and a tile roof with a coped gable. There are three storeys and seven bays. In the ground floor are shop fronts, and the upper floors contain sash windows.	II
33 Appleton Gate; 53.07711°N 0.80634°W	—	Early 19th century	A brick house on a plinth, with a floor band, rebated eaves, and a slate roof with coped gables and brick kneelers. There are three storeys and three bays. In the right bay is an elliptical-arched carriage opening with a keystone. The windows are sashes with panelled splayed lintels.	II
121 Balderton Gate; 53.07206°N 0.80331°W	—	Early 19th century	A brick house on a plinth, with stone dressings, a coped parapet, and a slate roof with coped gables. There are two storeys and an L-shaped plan, with a front range of three bays. The central doorway has a stone surround, a shouldered segmental head and a fanlight. The windows are sashes with rubbed brick heads. In the upper floor is a cast iron traceried balcony with a tent roof and decorative valance.	II
123 and 125 Balderton Gate; 53.07194°N 0.80312°W		Early 19th century	A pair of brick houses with stuccoed dressings and a slate roof. There are two storeys and five bays. The doorways have fanlights, the windows are sashes, and all the openings have multi-keystoned lintels.	II
30–36 Barnby Gate; 53.07531°N 0.80582°W	—	Early 19th century	Four houses, later shops and flats, in brick on a partial plinth, with floor bands, dentilled eaves and a pantile roof. There are three storeys and five bays. In the centre of the ground floor is a round-headed entry with a chamfered surround, and it is flanked by shop fronts. The upper floors contain a mix of sash and casement windows, all with segmental heads.	II
38, 38A and 40 Barnby Gate; 53.07524°N 0.80565°W		Early 19th century	A row of two houses and a shop in brick on a plinth, with stone dressings, an impost band, a sill band, moulded eaves and a slate roof. There are three storeys and three bays. In the right bay is a shop front with incurving windows and a recessed doorway. To the left are two doorways with reeded surrounds, paterae and fanlights, and two segmental arches containing windows. All the windows are sashes with segmental heads.	II
15, 17, 19, and 23 Bridge Street and 1 Appleton Gate; 53.07599°N 0.80778°W		Early 19th century	A row of houses, later shops, on a corner site, in colourwashed stucco, with coped parapets and roofs of tile and pantile. There are three storeys, nine bays on Bridge Street and four on Appleton Gate. In the ground floor are 20th-century shop fronts, and the upper floors contain mainly sash windows, and some casements.	II
5 and 7 Carter Gate; 53.07556°N 0.80795°W		Early 19th century	A public house, later two shops, in brick, with stone dressings, floor bands, dentilled eaves, and a tile roof with coped gables. There are three storeys and three bays. In the ground floor are two shop fronts with recessed doorways and fascias. The upper floors contain sash windows in the outer bays, the middle bay has a blank window with a casement above.	II
13–17 Carter Gate; 53.07543°N 0.80811°W		Early 19th century	A row of three houses, then shops, in brick, with a floor band, partly moulded modillion eaves, and roofs of tile and slate. In the ground floor is an elliptical-arched carriage entrance with imposts and a keystone, and shop fronts. The upper floors contain sash windows, one blank, with wedge lintels.	II
34, 36 36A and 38 Carter Gate; 53.07518°N 0.80874°W	—	Early 19th century	Three houses, later shops and a flat, in colourwashed brick with a slate roof. There are two storeys and three bays. In the centre of the ground floor is a segmental-headed entry, flanked by 19th-century shop fronts with pilasters and recessed doorways. In the upper floor are three sash windows, the outer ones tripartite.	II
60 and 62 Castlegate; 53.07599°N 0.81398°W		Early 19th century	A pair of brick houses with a slate roof. There are two storeys and three bays. In the ground floor is doorway and a passage entry, and the windows are sashes; all the openings have segmental heads.	II
3 and 5 King Street; 53.07286°N 0.81835°W	—	Early 19th century	A pair of brick houses with a floor band and a pantile roof. There are two storeys and two bays. In the centre are paired doorways with moulded surrounds, paterae and fanlights. The windows are sashes with multi-keystoned lintels.	II
33 and 33A Kirkgate; 53.07748°N 0.80936°W	—	Early 19th century	A house, later a shop and a flat, in colourwashed rendered brick, with dentilled eaves and a slate roof. There are three storeys and four bays. In the ground floor is a late 19th-century shop front with pilasters and a cornice, and a splayed central doorway with a fanlight, and to the left is an entrance doorway with moulded jambs. The upper floors contain sash windows with segmental heads; those in the middle two bays are blank.	II
6 and 6A Lombard Street; 53.07476°N 0.80964°W	—	Early 19th century	A house, later an office, in brick on a plinth, with a floor band, moulded dentilled eaves, a gable band and a tile roof. There are three storeys and three bays. In the ground floor is a doorway with a fanlight, to its left is a shop front with a recessed doorway, and to the right is a shop window. The upper floor contain sash windows, and all the openings have rubbed brick heads.	II
21 Lombard Street; 53.07485°N 0.81108°W	—	Early 19th century	A house, later offices, in brick, colourwashed on the front, on a plinth, with stone dressings, sill bands, the upper one moulded, an eaves band, and a hipped slate roof. There are two storeys and three bays. The central doorway has double pilasters, a fanlight, a panelled frieze and a cornice. The windows are sashes with moulded surrounds, those in the upper floor with flat hoods on scroll brackets.	II
39 and 41 London Road; 53.07162°N 0.80227°W		Early 19th century	A pair of houses in brick, colourwashed on the front, on a plinth, with a hipped slate roof. There are two storeys, a front range of six bays, the middle four bays projecting slightly, and a two-storey rear wing with a mansard roof. The doorway is in Classical style, with a fanlight and a hood. The windows are sashes with wavy boxes, and in the angle at the rear is a hipped porch.	II
43–49 London Road; 53.07142°N 0.80199°W	—	Early 19th century	A row of four brick houses, with dressings in stone and stucco, floor bands, and a slate roof. There are three storeys and five bays. The house doorways have reeded surrounds, fanlights, paterae and small hoods, and there is a round-arched entry doorway with imposts and a keystone. Most of the windows are sashes with multi-keystoned lintels, and there is a three-light casement window.	II
55 London Road; 53.07128°N 0.80165°W	—	Early 19th century	A school, later a house, in brick, with dressings in stone and stucco, a floor band, moulded eaves, and a hipped slate roof surmounted by a square bellcote with a pyramidal roof. In the centre is a Doric porch in front of which are painted sculptures of lions, and a doorway with a fanlight. This flanked by canted bay windows, and the upper floors contain casement windows with multi-keystoned lintels.	II
57–63 London Road; 53.07109°N 0.80129°W	—	Early 19th century	A terrace of four houses on a chamfered plinth, with dressings in stone and stucco, moulded eaves, and a roof of tile and slate. There are three storeys and ten bays. On the front are two Doric porches, and three doorways, one with a fanlight. Most of the windows are sashes, and there are five French windows with balconies. The openings have multi-keystoned lintels.	II
16 Market Place; 53.07658°N 0.80890°W	—	Early 19th century	A house later used for other purposes, in painted stucco on a plinth, with a floor band, a cornice and a parapet. There are three storeys and a front of two bays. In the ground floor is a wooden shop front with reeded pilasters and a segmental pediment on brackets, and the upper floors contain sash windows, those in the middle floor with cornices. In the left return are segmental-headed shop windows with keystones.	II
16 Middlegate; 53.07721°N 0.81032°W	—	Early 19th century	A house, later a shop, in brick, with dentilled eaves and a pantile roof. There are two storeys and two bays, and a rear wing with two storeys and attics. On the front, the ground floor has a rendered shop front with a splayed central doorway, and above are sash windows with tumbled brick arches. The rear wing has sash windows with segmental heads, and two box dormers.	II
20 Middlegate; 53.07714°N 0.81038°W		Early 19th century	A house later used for other purposes, in brick with stone dressings, plain eaves and a pantile roof. There are three storeys and two bays. The windows are sashes with flat heads, and to the right is a round-headed doorway with a chamfered surround.	II
7 and 9 Millgate; 53.07559°N 0.81437°W		Early 19th century	A pair of brick houses on a rendered plinth, with rebated eaves and a pantile roof. There are two storeys and three bays. In the ground floor are two doorways with segmental heads. The windows are sashes, those in the ground floor with segmental heads, and in the upper floor is a blank window.	II
16A–16E Millgate; 53.07552°N 0.81478°W	—	Early 19th century	A house divided into flats, in brick on a plinth, with stone dressings, floor bands, and a slate roof. There are three storeys, and a front of three bays. In the centre of the front is a doorway with a plain surround, a fanlight, an open pediment on scroll brackets, and an adjacent Gothic-arched bootscraper. The windows on the front are sashes with splayed lintels. On the right return is a doorway with pilasters and a flat hood, and two of the windows have segmental heads.	II
18A–18E Millgate; 53.07546°N 0.81487°W	—	Early 19th century	A house divided into flats, in brick on a plinth, with stone dressings, floor bands, plain eaves, and a slate roof with coped gables. There are three storeys, and a front of three bays, the middle bay projecting. In the centre is a doorway with a plain surround, a fanlight, an open pediment on scroll brackets, and an adjacent Gothic-arched bootscraper. The windows on the front are sashes, those in the lower two floors with splayed lintels. In the left return is a doorway with pilasters, a fanlight, and a moulded hood, and sash windows with segmental heads.	II
Railing and gate to left of 26 and 28 Millgate; 53.07513°N 0.81534°W	—	Early 19th century	Along the front of the garden is a round-topped stone plinth carrying a cast iron spearhead railing with fluted balusters. The gate is a replacement.	II
103 and 105 Millgate and 1 King Street; 53.07294°N 0.81849°W		Early 19th century	Three houses on a corner site, in red brick with pantile roofs. There are two storeys, and three bays on both fronts. On Millgate are two doorways with fanlights, to their left is a round-arched entry doorway, and there is one doorway on King Street. Most of the windows are sashes, and all the openings have segmental heads.	II
115–119 Millgate; 53.07229°N 0.81911°W		Early 19th century	Three houses in brick, partly rendered, on a plinth, with stone dressings, a floor band, dentilled eaves and a pantile roof. There are three storeys and cellars, and five bays, the middle three bays projecting slightly. On the front are two doorways with fanlights, the windows are sashes with wedge lintels and keystones, and the cellars have slit lights.	II
12 Northgate; 53.07880°N 0.80949°W	—	Early 19th century	A house, later a shop, in brick, with dentilled eaves and a slate roof. There are two storeys and five bays. It contains a shop front with a recessed doorway, and most of the windows are sashes, most with segmental heads.	II
13 and 15 Northgate; 53.07937°N 0.80897°W		Early 19th century	A pair of houses in brick, with a floor band, cogged eaves and a pantile roof. There are three storeys and four bays. In the ground floor are two doorways with segmental heads and fanlights, and to the left is a round-headed passage entry. The windows are sashes with segmental heads.	II
18 Northgate; 53.07899°N 0.80919°W		Early 19th century	A brick house with a slate roof, two storeys and four bays. The doorway has a fanlight and a segmental head, and the windows, some of which are blank, also have segmental heads.	II
2–14 Parliament Street; 53.07322°N 0.81784°W	—	Early 19th century	A terrace of seven brick houses with cogged eaves and a pantile roof. There are two storeys and seven bays. The left house has a shop window with pilasters and a cornice, to its left is a doorway, and to the right are paired doorways, all with fanlights and adjacent Gothic-arched bootscrapers. The windows are sashes, and the openings have segmental heads.	II
13 Parliament Street; 53.07297°N 0.81704°W	—	Early 19th century	A brick house, with stone dressings, a floor band, and a pantile roof. There are two storeys and two bays. In the ground floor is a doorway with a fanlight, to its left is an ogee-headed boot scraper, and to the right is a carriage entrance with a segmental head, imposts and a keystone. The windows are sashes, and the windows and doorway have panelled splay lintels with keystones.	II
27 and 29 Pelham Street; 53.07377°N 0.81389°W		Early 19th century	A pair of brick houses with cogged eaves and a pantile roof. There are three storeys and three bays. In the centre is a pair of doors with fanlights, and between them is an ogee-headed bootscraper. Above are blank windows, the left bay contains casements, and in the right bay the windows are sashes.	II
23 and 25 Portland Street; 53.07378°N 0.81143°W	—	Early 19th century	A house, later a shop and a flat, in brick, with a floor band and a slate roof. There are three storeys and three bays. In the ground floor is a full-width terrazzo shop front, and the upper floors contain sash windows, the middle window in each floor a dummy.	II
7–12 St Leonard's Court; 53.07747°N 0.80848°W		Early 19th century	A terrace of six brick houses in colourwashed brick, with a floor band, cogged eaves and a pantile roof. There are two storeys and attics, and twelve bays. The doorways and ground floor windows have segmental heads, and in the attics are five raking dormers.	II
Former Blue Man public house and cottages 53.08300°N 0.80279°W		Early 19th century	The former public house and adjoining cottages are in brick with pantile roofs. The public house has three storeys and three bays, a floor band, a doorway with a segmental head and a fanlight. The windows are a mix of casements and horizontally-sliding sashes, those in the lower two floors with segmental heads. The cottages to the right have dentilled eaves, two storeys and three bays, and contain an elliptical-arched carriage entrance.	II
Britannia Buildings; 53.07283°N 0.81685°W		Early 19th century	A house, at one time a shop, in brick with a tile roof. There are two storeys and attics, and two bays. In the ground floor are two shop windows and a doorway to the right, all under a continuous cornice. The upper floor contains an overpainted sign flanked by sash windows.	II
Bull Ring or Bear Baiting Post; 53.07640°N 0.80925°W		Early 19th century	This consists of a square wooden post about 5 feet (1.5 m) high. It has a lead cap, and attached to it is a leather and iron collar on a chain, and staples for two other chains.	II
Castle and Falcon public house and outbuildings 53.07382°N 0.80939°W	—	Early 19th century	The public house is in brick with dentilled eaves and a slate roof. There are two storeys and two bays. On the front are a central doorway and casement windows, the openings in the ground floor with segmental heads. At the rear is a long single-storey wing with roofs in slate and pantile.	II
Crow View; 53.07280°N 0.81868°W	—	Early 19th century	A brick house on a plinth, with stone dressings, a floor band, moulded eaves, and a slate roof with coped gables. There are two storeys and three bays. In the centre is a doorway with a moulded surround, a fanlight, and a hood on curved brackets. The windows are sashes with splayed multi-keystoned lintels.	II
Former Crown and Mitre Hotel; 53.07633°N 0.81297°W	—	Early 19th century	A house, later a public house, in brick on a chamfered plinth, with dressings in yellow brick in the ground floor, and a slate roof. There are three storeys, and an L-shaped plan with a front range of three bays. In the ground floor is a doorway with a fanlight flanked by windows, and to the left is a carriage entry, all under a continuous fascia cornice on curved brackets. The upper floors contain sash windows, and to the left is a wrought iron sign bracket. The rear wing has two storeys and ten bays, and it contains sash and cross-casement windows.	II
Former Fosseway Hotel; 53.07555°N 0.81301°W		Early 19th century	The house, at one time a hotel, is in brick, colourwashed at the front, on a plinth, with a sill band and a slate roof. There are two storeys and three bays. In the centre, steps lead up to a doorway with pilasters, a fanlight, and an open pediment on scroll brackets. The windows are sashes with rubbed brick heads.	II
Former Horse and Gears public house 53.07381°N 0.81132°W		Early 19th century	The public house is in brick with stone dressings, a floor band, a wooden gutter on shaped brackets, and a pantile roof. There are three storeys and four bays. In the left bay of the ground floor is a doorway with a fanlight, and a round headed entry in the right bay with an ornate fanlight, and elsewhere are sash windows, those in the right bay blank.	II
Klynton House and walls 53.07132°N 0.80182°W	—	Early 19th century	A pair of brick houses on a plinth, with dressings in stone and stucco, moulded eaves, a gable band and a slate roof. There are three storeys, a double-range plan, and four bays, the middle two bays projecting. In the centre is a pair of doorways, each with a moulded surround and a fanlight, under a common hood with scroll brackets. The windows are sashes with multi-keystoned lintels. At each end is a stone-coped brick wall with a square pier and a cross-gabled cap. To the right is a brick wall with ramped stone coping and a square wooden post with an iron cap.	II
Newark Physical Culture Club; 53.07884°N 0.80899°W	—	Early 19th century	A coach house and stable converted for other uses, in brick with stone dressings and a slate roof. There are two storeys and three bays. On the front is a blocked carriage entrance with an inserted door, and windows with segmental heads.	II
Pelham Mews Workshops; 53.07380°N 0.81408°W		Early 19th century	A house and former livery stable, later workshops, in brick with stone dressings, cogged eaves, and a pantile roof. There are two storeys and three bays. In the left bay is a segmental-headed carriage entrance, and to the right is a doorway with a fanlight. The windows are sashes, and all the openings have segmental heads. Between the upper floor windows is a painted sign.	II
Purefoy House; 53.07811°N 0.81014°W	—	Early 19th century	A house, later an office, it is stuccoed, and has a rusticated ground floor, double pilasters above, a frieze with wreaths, and a pediment. There are two storeys and two bays. In each floor are sash windows, the ground floor contains to the right a doorway with a fanlight, and to the left a single-pane window.	II
South Parade Hotel and wall 53.07218°N 0.80352°W		Early 19th century	Two houses, later a hotel, in brick with stone dressings, a coped parapet, and a slate roof with coped gables. There are three storeys and a basement, a double depth plan, and a front range of six bays, the outer bays recessed. In the outer bays are doorways with segmental heads and fanlights, approached by steps with twisted cast iron balustrades. The windows are sashes with multi-keystoned lintels. To the left is a boundary wall with ramped brick coping.	II
Stella House; 53.07174°N 0.80261°W	—	Early 19th century	A brick house on a plinth, with stone dressings, corner pilasters, a gable band and a slate roof. There are two storeys and three bays, the middle bay containing a full height segmental-arched recess. The central doorway has a fanlight and a flat hood on scrolled brackets. The windows are sashes with multi-keystoned lintels and blind boxes.	II
Mount School; 53.07751°N 0.80698°W		1826	A cross wing was added to the schoolroom in 1838, and the bell tower in 1877. The school is in stucco and painted brick on a plinth, with rebated eaves and slate roofs. The original schoolroom has pilasters, a single storey, six bays on the side, and two bays on the end with a pedimented gable. The windows are sashes, and on the right side is a hipped porch. The cross wing has two storeys and four bays. The square bell tower is in brick with stone dressings, three stages and a pyramidal roof. In the ground floor is a segmental entrance with a keystone, above is a round-headed window, and the bell openings are paired with segmental heads.	II
2 and 3 Church Street; 53.07669°N 0.80905°W		c. 1830	Two houses, later a shop, in colourwashed brick, with moulded eaves and a slate roof. There are three storeys and three bays. In the ground floor is a late 19th-century wooden shop front with reeded pilasters, an inscribed fascia cornice on curved brackets, and a recessed doorway. To its left is an elliptical-arched carriage entrance. In the upper floors, the middle windows are blind, the others are sashes; the openings in the left two bays have segmental heads.	II
4 and 4A Church Street; 53.07677°N 0.80897°W	—	c. 1830	A house, later a shop, in colourwashed brick with a slate roof. There are two storeys and three bays. In the ground floor is a late 19th-century shop front with panelled pilasters, a fascia on curved brackets, and a central window flanked by recessed doorways. The upper floors contain sash windows, those in the middle floor with segmental heads.	II
28–38 Parliament Street; 53.07268°N 0.81695°W		c. 1830	A terrace of six brick houses with dressings in stone and stucco, a floor band, rebated eaves, a gable band and pantile roofs. There are two storeys and attics, and eight bays. The doorways have fanlights and Gothic-arched bootscrapers, and there is a flat-headed entry The windows are sashes, and all the openings have multi-keystoned lintels. In the right return is an angled doorway on the corner, a shop window and windows with segmental heads.	II
Holly Cottage; 53.07222°N 0.81555°W	—	c. 1830	A coach house converted into a private house, it is in colourwashed brick with stone dressings and a tile roof. There are two storeys and an L-shaped plan, with a front range of three bays. The doorway in the right bay has a segmental head, to its left is a segmental carriage opening converted into a window, and the other windows are casements, those in the upper floor with reeded splayed lintels.	II
Former subscription library 53.07663°N 0.80910°W		c. 1830	Originally a subscription library on a corner site, and later used for other purposes, it is in yellow brick on a plinth, with dressings in red brick and stone, a panelled floor band, a moulded cornice and a blocking course, and a hipped slate roof. There are two storeys and five bays, with a curved corner. In the ground floor is a shop front with a continuous fascia. On the corner is a doorway with a polychrome round head and a fanlight, and on the Church Street side is a shop front with a polychrome segmental head, both openings with keystones. The upper floor contains sash windows.	II
The Hollies; 53.07215°N 0.81565°W	—	c. 1830	A brick house with stone dressings, a floor band, deep eaves and a hipped slate roof. There are two storeys and a basement, and an L-shaped plan with a front range of three bays. Steps lead up to the central doorway that has a reeded surround, a fanlight, and a flat hood on curved brackets. The windows are sashes with splayed lintels.	II
Thorpe's Warehouse; 53.07562°N 0.81518°W		c. 1830	A maltings later used for other purposes, in brick with a hipped tile roof. There are five storeys and fronts of three and six bays. Most of the openings have segmental heads, most of them are small windows, and in each front a bay contains a loading door in each storey. There is a cross passage through the building, and on the north side are external steps.	II
16, 18 and 20 King Street; 53.07238°N 0.81780°W	—	1833	A row of three brick houses, No. 20 colourwashed, the others with a rendered ground floor, and pantile roofs. There are two storeys and five bays. The right two houses form a pair containing a central round-headed entry with a blind fanlight, imposts and an initialled and dated keystone. The doorways have plain surrounds, the windows are sashes, and all the openings have splayed lintels.	II
14 Millgate; 53.07565°N 0.81459°W	—	c. 1835	A brick house with stone dressings, moulded wooden eaves, and a slate roof with two coped gables. There are two storeys, a square plan, fronts of two bays, and a single-storey extension that has a parapet with moulded coping. The doorway and the windows, which are sashes, have multi-keystoned lintels.	II
20 Parliament Street; 53.07297°N 0.81739°W	—	c. 1835	A shop, later a house, in brick with stucco dressings and a pantile roof. There are two storeys and an attic, and two bays. In the ground floor is a shop window with a cornice, to the right is a doorway with a reeded surround and a cusp-headed bootscraper, and further to the right is a round-headed entry. The upper floor contains sash windows with splayed lintels, above them are decorative stucco panels with moulded surrounds, and in the attic in the right gable is a casement window.	II
Former Christ Church; 53.07547°N 0.81180°W		1836–37	The church, later converted for other purposes, is in yellow brick, with stone dressings and slate roofs, and is in Early English style. It consists of a nave, aisles, a sanctuary and vestries. The front facing the street has three gabled bays, the middle bay taller and recessed with spired pinnacles and a cross finial. It contains an arched doorway with a moulded surround, shafts, and a moulded gable containing a trefoil, and above it is a triple lancet window with hood moulds. The outer bays also contain doorways with moulded surrounds and hood moulds, and above each doorway is a single lancet window with a hood mould.	II
25 Crown Street and 33 Victoria Street; 53.07244°N 0.81487°W		c. 1840	A house on a corner site, in brick on a rendered plinth, with sill bands, moulded eaves and a hipped slate roof. There are three storeys and a basement, and fronts of three bays. On the Victoria Street front, steps flanked by wrought iron handrails lead up to a doorway that has a flat hood on scroll brackets, and there is a similar doorway on the Crown Street front. The windows are sashes, and there are some dummy windows.	II
3 and 5 Parliament Street; 53.07314°N 0.81723°W	—	c. 1840	A pair of houses in brick with stucco dressings, floor bands, a moulded eaves cornice and a pantile roof. There are two storeys and a front of three bays, with flanking recessed outer bays. In the centre are two doorways with fanlights, and the windows are sashes; all the openings with splayed lintels. In the outer bays are entry doorways and above them are blank windows.	II
24, 24A and 24B Portland Street; 53.07379°N 0.81190°W	—	c. 1840	A house converted into shops and flats, in brick on a plinth, with dressings in stone and wood, sill bands, corner brick pilasters, modillion eaves, and a slate roof with coped gables. There are three storeys and three bays, the middle bay projecting slightly and containing a two-storey arched recess. In the centre is a doorway with a reeded surround, paterae, a fanlight and a cornice, flanked by 19th-century shop fronts with pilasters, and each with a bracketed cornice and a doorway in a splayed recess. The windows are sashes with reeded surrounds, paterae and keystones, those in the middle bay with segmental heads.	II
4 Prince's Street and 39 Victoria Street; 53.07225°N 0.81540°W		c. 1840	Two houses on a corner site in yellow brick on a plinth, with dressings in stone and stucco, floor bands, dentilled eaves, and a slate roof with pedimented gables. There are four storeys, four bays on Victoria Street and three on Prince's Street. The doorway on Victoria Street has a reeded surround, a fanlight and a flat hood on scroll brackets. The windows on this front are mainly sash windows, those in the left bay are dummies, and all have multi-keystoned lintels. On the Prince's Street front are semicircular windows in the left bay and the pediment. The central doorway, which has a fanlight, and the other windows, which are sashes, have multi-keystoned lintels.	II
5 and 7 Victoria Street; 53.07315°N 0.81302°W		c. 1840	A pair of brick houses on a plinth, with stone dressings, floor bands, and roofs in tile and slate with pedimented gables. There are three storeys and five bays. On the front are two doorways, on the left with a round-arched head, on the right with pilasters and a cornice, and both with fanlights. The windows are sashes with wedge lintels and keystones.	II
23 and 25 Victoria Street; 53.07265°N 0.81441°W		c. 1840	A pair of brick houses on a rendered plinth, with stone dressings, sill bands, dentilled eaves and a slate roof. There are three storeys and three bays, each bay containing a full-height elliptical-arched recess. In the middle bay is a pair of doorways with fluted moulded surrounds and a common hood on scrolled brackets. The windows are sashes with splayed lintels and keystones. In front of the houses is a spearhead cast iron railing on a brick plinth containing brick piers.	II
37 Victoria Street; 53.07236°N 0.81519°W		c. 1840	A brick house with dressings in stone and stucco, a floor band, moulded eaves, and a slate roof with a single coped gable. There are two storeys, and an L-shaped plan with a front range of three bays, and a rear wing. In the centre is a doorway with a moulded surround, a fanlight, and a flat hood on curved brackets. This is flanked by cross-casement windows, and in the upper floor are sash windows with multi-keystoned lintels.	II
Former infants' school 53.07279°N 0.81825°W		1840	The school, later used for other purposes, is in brick with stone dressings, a parapet wall on the left, and a roof of pantile and slate, There is a single storey, an L-shaped plan, and a front of two bays. The central doorway has an inscribed and dated lintel, and the flanking windows are cross-casements.	II
Hesketh House; 53.07204°N 0.81721°W		c. 1840	A brick house with stucco dressings, chamfered quoins, a floor band, modillion eaves and a hipped slate roof. There are two storeys and three bays. The central doorcase projects, and has a rusticated surround, a round-arched head and a keystone, and the recessed door has a fanlight. The windows are sashes with flat lintels on brackets, in the left return is a stair window, and the right return contains casement windows.	II
Kirkwood House; 53.07675°N 0.80728°W	—	c. 1840	The house is in brick with a rendered right gable, a sill band, rebated eaves and a slate roof. There are two storeys, a double depth plan, and a front range of three bays. The doorway has a fanlight and a flat hood with scroll brackets, and the windows are sashes with splayed lintels. In the right gable is a two-storey canted bay window and a segmental-headed stair window.	II
Barnby Gate Methodist Church and railings 53.07572°N 0.80639°W		1844–46	The church is in brick on a plinth, with stone dressings, quoins, an entablature, and a coped parapet. There are two storeys, four bays on the front and six on the sides. In the outer bays are Doric porticos with square and round columns, and doorways with moulded surrounds and fanlights. Between the porticos are two flat-headed windows with moulded surrounds. The upper floor contains pairs of pilasters and round-headed sash windows. On the sides are full-height recesses with moulded round heads and hood moulds, containing sash windows, round-headed in the upper storey and with flat heads below. In front of the church are dwarf walls with cast iron spearhead railings.	II
Castle Railway Station; 53.08022°N 0.81301°W		1846	The station was built by the Midland Railway, and is in Italianate style. It is in yellow brick on a plinth, with stone dressings, chamfered quoins, a cornice, a blocking course, and hipped slate roofs. There is a single storey and nine bays, the end bays recessed and apsidal. The middle three bays project, they are flanked by pilasters, and in the centre is a doorway, above which is a flat gable with scroll brackets. The outer bays contain sash windows with cornices on scroll brackets. On the platform side is a canopy, and round round-headed openings flanked by pilasters.	II
Former Corn Exchange; 53.07671°N 0.81296°W		1847–48	The corn exchange, later used for other purposes, was designed by Henry Duesbury, and has a front in stone, and brick at the rear. The front has a single storey and three bays, there are eight bays along the sides, and there are two storeys and a basement at the rear. At the front are steps, and the front contains giant Corinthian double pilasters, a cornice, a balustrade with a central dated panel, and double corner pedestals with finials. There are three round-headed alcoves with pilasters, keystones, and coffered panelled heads containing doors. At the top is a square tower with pilasters, a pedimented gable, and an octagonal dome with a finial, flanked by sculptures of allegorical figures by John Bell. At the rear is a two-stage octagonal bell turret with a conical roof.	II
9 and 11 King Street; 53.07267°N 0.81798°W	—	Mid 19th century	A pair of brick houses with chamfered dentilled eaves and a pantile roof. There are two storeys and two bays. The doorways have fanlights and round-headed bootscrapers, the windows are sashes, and all the openings have chamfered lintels.	II
16 Northgate; 53.07893°N 0.80904°W		Mid 19th century	A brick house with stone dressings and a hipped slate roof. There are two storeys, and an L-shaped plan, with a front range of four bays. The openings on the front have splayed lintels, and at the rear most have segmental heads.	II
Former Evening Post office 53.07787°N 0.80999°W	—	Mid 19th century	A house, later an office, then a shop, in brick, with stucco dressings, floor bands, dentilled eaves and a tile roof. There are three storeys and three bays. In the ground floor is a shop front, and the upper floors contain a mix of sash and casement windows, those in the middle bay blank, all with splayed lintels and keystones.	II
Newark Working Men's Club; 53.07635°N 0.80055°W		Mid 19th century	A house later used for other purposes, it is stuccoed, and has chamfered quoins, dentilled eaves and a hipped slate roof. There are two storeys and attics, and three bays, the middle bay projecting. In the centre is a tetrastyle Doric portico with a dentilled cornice, and a doorway with pilasters and multiple keystones. In the upper floor is a round-headed French window with a fanlight flanked by sash windows. The outer bays contain tripartite sash windows.	II
Former offices, Northgate railway station 53.08105°N 0.79945°W		Mid 19th century	The former offices are timber framed with matchboard cladding and a slate roof. There is a single storey, and four bays with shaped posts. There are two doorways with fanlights, and the windows are sashes.	II
Wall and gatepiers, The Friary; 53.07798°N 0.80486°W		Mid 19th century	The wall enclosing the grounds is in stone. The main range is about 115 metres (377 ft) long and 2 metres (6 ft 7 in) high. It contains a pair of square gate piers, with quoins and caps with domed finials. The coping to the right of the gateway is in stone, and to the left it is in brick. The northeast range has gabled coping and extends for about 30 metres (98 ft), and the east range is about 40 metres (130 ft) long.	II
Water pump and trough 53.07643°N 0.80931°W		Mid 19th century	The water pump in Market Place has an obelisk-shaped panelled cast iron case and a spout, above which are the Town Arms. There is a curved wrought iron handle on the right side, and roundels with wreaths on the other sides. In front is a renewed stone trough.	II
Northgate Railway Station; 53.08161°N 0.79980°W		1852	The station was built by the Great Northern Railway. It is in brick with slate roofs, and is in one and two storeys and has 22 bays. The southern range, which contains waiting rooms, has cast iron posts projecting above the roof and supporting the canopy by suspension rods. The canopy has a valance, and the brackets are traceried. To the north are two further ranges.	II
Cemetery Chapels; 53.06736°N 0.79904°W		1856	The cemetery chapels are in brick and stone, with limestone dressings and patterned tile roofs, and are in Decorated style. The building consists of an archway surmounted by a bell turret and flanked by chapels. The archway is pointed and has a moulded surround, imposts and a hood mould, and is flanked by buttresses with crocketed pinnacles. The bell turret has two stages, angle buttresses with pinnacles, bell openings with ogee heads, and an octagonal needle spire with lucarnes. The chapels are linked to the archway, and have porches containing doorways with moulded surrounds and hood moulds.	II
Kiln Warehouse; 53.08037°N 0.81076°W		1857	A maltings, later a warehouse, in mass concrete, rendered externally, on a plinth, with floor bands, moulded eaves and hipped pantile roofs. There are three storeys and 18 bays, with six hipped bays on the river front. Most of the openings have segmental heads, and on each main front is a gabled wooden hoist canopy.	II*
Former station master's house, Castle Station; 53.07984°N 0.81350°W		c. 1860	The house is in brick on a plinth, with stone dressings, dentilled eaves and a hipped pantile roof. There are two storeys and three bays, the right bay projecting, and on the right is a single-storey extension. The doorway has a fanlight, the windows are sashes, and the ground floor openings have moulded segmental heads.	II
The Clock Tower; 53.07928°N 0.81209°W		c. 1860	Office buildings with a clock tower in brick, partly rendered, with stone dressings and hipped slate roofs. The office block has two storeys, and contains arcades of round arches with shafts, containing round-headed windows. On the roof is a continuous dormer containing ten round windows. On the northeast front is a doorway and a canted bay window. To the northwest is a three-storey square clock tower. The top stage is stuccoed, and contains Doric pilasters flanking round-arched windows, and a full entablature. Above is an ornate gable containing a clock face, a pyramidal roof with a round-headed lucarne, an iron balustrade and a flag pole.	II
Maltings, Northgate Brewery; 53.08261°N 0.80633°W		1864	The former maltings are in red brick on a cogged plinth, with dressings in yellow brick, a floor band, dentilled eaves, and artificial slate roofs. The main range has two storeys. The main kiln has two storeys, sides of two bays, and a hipped roof with two pyramidal cowls with wooden hoods and copper fantails in the form of hop leaves. There is a smaller kiln with similar features and a single cowl, and a three-storey water tower. Most of the openings have segmental polychrome heads.	II
Song School; 53.07715°N 0.80831°W		1866	The school is in brick on a plinth, with stone dressings, quoins, a floor band, and a slate roof with coped shouldered gables and finials. There are two storeys and two staggered parallel ranges, and to the left is a lean-to porch. In the right return is a doorway with a Tudor arch, and the windows are cross-casements.	II
Gateway to Cemetery; 53.06914°N 0.79887°W		c. 1870	The gateway is in cast iron, and consists of two sets of traceried incurving railings, with a main central gateway flanked by single pedestrian gates. The gates have square skeleton piers, with billeted pyramidal caps, each surmounted by a fleur-de-lys.	II
Millgate Folk Museum; 53.07485°N 0.81671°W		1870	A warehouse and maltings converted for other uses, including a museum, in brick with slate roofs. The river front of the warehouse has a hipped roof, five storeys, a T-shaped plan, and six bays. It contains openings with segmental heads, and in the third bay are loft doors, there is a hoist gallery in the fourth floor, and in the ground floor is a doorway. To the right is a gabled range with four storeys and five bays, containing hoist doors and a gabled hoist canopy in the second bay, and a tall round-headed window in the right bay. Further to the right is a lower two-storey range containing the base and coping of a chimney stack, and blocked round-arched doorways.	II
North Malt Warehouse; 53.08114°N 0.81061°W		c. 1870	A maltings, later a warehouse, in rendered mass concrete with hipped Welsh slate roofs. There are three storeys and 18 bays. On the river front, two of the bays contain loft doors and gabled hoist canopies, and the windows have segmental heads. At the rear is a three-storey kiln at each end.	II
Ossington Chambers; 53.07825°N 0.81069°W		c. 1870	A row of four brick houses, later offices, on a chamfered plinth, with slate roofs, four shouldered coped gables with finials, and a parapet on the left. There are two storeys and attics, and nine bays, the alternate bays gabled. The five doorways have moulded, eared and shouldered architraves, fanlights, hood moulds and round-headed bootscrapers. Each gabled bay contains a two-storey square bay window, and the windows are mullioned.	II
Northgate brewery office range and brewhouse 53.08201°N 0.80486°W		1871	The brewhouse is in red brick with blue brick dressings and slate roofs. There are three storeys and four bays, and two two-storey three-bay ranges to the left. The office range dates from 1890, and is in brick with dressings in terracotta and brick, a hipped tile roof, two storeys and 14 bays. In the left bay is a round-arched carriage entrance with imposts and a keystone, above which is a canted oriel window, and a crest flanked by fluted pilasters. To the right is a doorway with a moulded surround and a scrolled broken pediment. In the other bays, the ground floor contains round-headed cross-casement windows, and in the upper floor are segmental-headed sash windows, all with keystones.	II
44, 46 and 46A Kirkgate; 53.07700°N 0.80899°W	—	c. 1875	Two houses and a shop in brick with stone dressings, impost bands, a modillion eaves cornice, a coped parapet, and a slate mansard roof. There are three storeys and an attic, and three bays. In the ground floor is a shop front, flanked by doorways with panelled pilasters and a cornice on scrolled foliate brackets; the left doorway has a round head, a keystone and a cast iron grill, and the right doorway has a flat head and a fanlight. The middle floor contains a canted oriel window, and the other windows are sashes with segmental heads, keystones, hood moulds and aprons. In the attic is a central pedimented dormer flanked by box dormers.	II
47 Market Place; 53.07599°N 0.80987°W	—	c. 1875	A brick shop with stone dressings, moulded cornices between the floors and in the eaves, and a slate roof with a double coped gable on the right. There are three storeys and attics, and three bays. In the ground floor is a shop front with a fascia, a round-headed passage entry on the left and a flat-headed entry on the right. Above, in the outer bays are two-storey canted oriel windows, the middle bay contains sash windows, and in the attic are three gabled dormers with bargeboards and finials.	II
Freestanding chimney 53.07640°N 0.80804°W		c. 1875	The freestanding chimney to the southeast of St Mary Magdalene Church is in brick, with dressings in stone and blue brick, and reinforcement in iron. It has a square base with a plain band, a tapered octagonal shaft, and a coped top.	II
Goods warehouse, Castle Station; 53.08158°N 0.81150°W		c. 1875	The warehouse, later converted for residential use, is in brick on a chamfered plinth, with dressings in stone and blue and yellow brick, pilasters, a brick modillion eaves cornice, a stone cornice, and a hipped slate roof. There are two storeys and fronts of 13 and three bays. In the ground floor are three double doors and windows with round arched heads, and the upper floor windows have segmental heads.	II
8 London Road; 53.07390°N 0.80944°W	—	Late 19th century	A brick house, colourwashed on the front, with floor bands, cogged, dentilled and sprocketed eaves, and a pantile roof. There are three storeys and three bays. The central doorway has a flathood on scroll brackets, and the windows are sashes with rubbed brick heads.	II
45 Stodman Street; 53.07636°N 0.81199°W	—	Late 19th century	A house, later a shop, in brick, with stone dressings, a floor band, moulded eaves and a slate roof. There are three storeys and two bays. In the ground floor is a shop front with a three-light window, a doorway to the left and an entry to the right. The middle floor contains two elliptical-arched recesses with keystones, each containing two sash windows, and in the top floor are pairs of sash windows with mullions and chamfered surrounds.	II
21 Kirkgate; 53.07776°N 0.80965°W	—	c. 1880	A house, later a shop, in brick with stone dressings, quoins, a moulded eaves cornice and a parapet. There are two storeys and two bays. In the ground floor is a shop front, and the upper floor contains sash windows with quoined surrounds, segmental heads and keystones.	II
The Arcade; 53.07588°N 0.80861°W		c. 1880	A shopping arcade incorporating buildings dating from the 16th and 18th centuries containing timber framing. The entrance, dating from the late 18th century, is in colourwashed brick with stucco dressings, rusticated quoins, floor bands, and a coped parapet. There are three storeys and three bays, and the windows are sashes with keystones. The entrance has an inscribed lintel, and to its right is a canted bay window. Inside the arcades are shop fronts with reeded pilasters and cornices on scroll brackets, and the roof is glazed with traceried cast iron trusses.	II
Office range, Castle Brewery; 53.07384°N 0.81039°W		1882	The office range, designed by William Bradford, incorporates the remains of an earlier workhouse. It is in limestone and brick, with dressings in granite, stone and terracotta, and has slate roofs. It is on a chamfered plinth, and has a modillion cornice, a panelled frieze, and a strapwork balustrade. There are two storeys and attics, and seven bays. The middle bay projects under a pediment and an inscribed frieze, above which is a square clock tower with a modillion cornice, a pierced balustrade, and a square dome with a spire. The central doorway is round-headed, and has a moulded surround and shafts. The windows are paired round-headed sashes, some with balconies, and the end bays contain giant rusticated terracotta pilasters.	II
Former Gilstrap Library; 53.07755°N 0.81183°W		1882	The library, later used for other purposes, is in stone on a chamfered plinth, with a sill band, moulded eaves, and a tile roof with shouldered coped gables and ornate finials, and an octagonal wooden lantern with a lead ogee dome. There is a single storey, attics and a basement, and a front of three gabled bays. The middle bay is recessed and contains an embattled porch with a crest and a finial, and a pointed doorway with shafts, and an inscribed lintel. The windows are chamfered, mullioned and transomed, and in the left bay is an embattled square bay window.	II
Wall and gatepiers, former Gilstrap Library; 53.07742°N 0.81164°W		1882	Flanking the entrance to the grounds, and at the ends of the walls, are octagonal stone gate piers, with square bases, ornate carving, and domed caps. The walls have moulded coping and railings.	II
Ossington Hotel, garden walls and summerhouse 53.07823°N 0.81124°W		1882	A coffee palace designed by Ernest George and Peto and later used for other purposes. It is in brick on a plinth, with dressings in blue brick and stone, a pargeted frieze, moulded eaves and a tile roof. There are two storeys and attics and six bays. In the ground floor is an open arcade of six elliptical arches, the right a carriage entrance, and the others containing windows. The upper floor contains six square oriel windows, a sundial and a wrought iron bracket lamp. In the left part of the attic are three gabled dormers with applied timber framing. On the river side is a balcony with splat balusters, and a curved garden wall in stone with brick bands and stone coping. This contains two half-round turrets, and a wrought iron gate with an overthrow and a lantern, and at the end is a square wooden summerhouse with a hipped roof.	II*
Club room and stables, Ossington Hotel; 53.07851°N 0.81095°W		1882	The buildings were designed by Ernest George and Peto, and are in brick, with dressings in blue brick, a tile roof, and tile-hung gables. There are in a single and two storeys with attics, and have three bays, and two large jettied gables. The left gable contains a pair of doors over which is a weatherboarded gallery under a segmental arch, and to the right is an external staircase. The right gable contains an eight-light strip window, with doorways above and below.	II*
Castle Brewery; 53.07345°N 0.80995°W		1885–90	The brewery, designed by William Bradford, is in brick with a steel and cast iron frame, and a pyramidal tile roof with two gabled dormers, and a wooden lantern with a pyramidal roof. The main block has five storeys and sides of four bays. The main doorway has a round-arched head, above it is a square oriel window, and the other windows are casements. To the left is a three-storey tower, and behind it is a four-storey cross wing and a three-storey seven-bay range.	II
Cask store, Castle Brewery; 53.07369°N 0.81029°W	—	c. 1885	The store consists of round cast iron posts carrying a trussed steel hipped roof with timber and zinc cladding. There is a single storey and sides of four bays. On the roof is a hipped clerestory.	II
School of Violin Making; 53.07721°N 0.80898°W		1887	A bank and manager's house designed by Watson Fothergill and later converted for other uses. It is in red brick on a chamfered plinth, with dressings in blue brick, terracotta and stone, and tile roofs. The banking hall has two storeys, three bays and a four-stage tower to the right. The bays are divided by pilasters, they contain full-height windows with polychromic round heads, and above is a balustrade. The ground floor stage of the tower has a round-headed recess with a hood mould containing double doorways with shafts, and a three-light window above. The bell stage contains round-headed recesses and three-light bell openings, and above is a pyramidal roof. The house to the left has three storeys and three bays. The central doorway has a three-light fanlight, and is flanked by two-light windows with shafts that form supports for oriel windows in the middle floor. The top floor contains round-headed sash windows with shafts.	II
Former Midland Bank; 53.07605°N 0.80845°W		c. 1895	The bank, on a corner site, is in stone on a moulded plinth, with a rusticated ground floor, pilasters, cornices, and a balustrade. There are two storeys and fronts of two and three bays, with a canted bay on the corner. In the corner is a Tuscan doorway with engaged columns and a segmental pediment with carving in the tympanum, over which are three sash windows with friezes above, surmounted by a lead dome with a finial. In the ground floor are round-headed recesses with paired columns, containing round-headed windows with bracket keystones, and railings in front. On the Bridge Street front, the outer bays contain round windows with scrolled surrounds and monograms. The upper floor contains sash windows with pediments.	II
Lilley and Stone School; 53.07263°N 0.80773°W		1898–1900	Built as the School of Science and Art and designed by Charles Mallows, it is in brick with angle pilasters, a floor band, dentilled eaves and a slate roof. There are two storeys and three bays, the outer bays projecting under pedimented gables. In the middle bay is a round-arched doorway with a moulded surround and a scrolled wrought iron overthrow, and above it is a three-light casement window. The outer bays each contain a polygonal bay window with a dentilled cornice and a copper tent roof, and above is a round-headed window with mullions and transoms.	II
Abbeywood; 53.07300°N 0.80661°W	—	c. 1900	A brick house with dressings in stone and terracotta, Corinthian corner pilasters, dentilled eaves and a hipped slate roof. There are two storeys and attics, and six bays. The doorway in the left return has a reeded surround and a shell hood. On the front is a canted bay window with a domed roof, and the windows are sashes with alternating segmental and gabled pediments.	II
National Westminster Bank; 53.07616°N 0.80989°W		1902	The bank, on a corner site, is in stone and brick, and has a slate mansard roof. There are three storeys and attics, and fronts of three and four bays, with an angled bay on the corner. It has a chamfered plinth with panels, a channelled rusticated ground floor, a sill band and cornice, a decorated modillion eaves cornice, and coped gables. The doorway in the corner bay has a rusticated surround, a fanlight, a keystone and a segmental pediment, and above it are tripartite sash windows. The ground floor windows have segmental heads and keystones, and in the upper floors are two-storey oriel bow windows, flanked by sash windows with keystones, and in the attics are pedimented dormers.	II
Memorial drinking fountain 53.07137°N 0.80248°W		c. 1903	The memorial drinking fountain by a road junction is in stone. It has a tapered square pedestal on a plinth, a tapered square shaft decorated with foliage, and is surmounted by a dome. On the sides are round-topped panels, two with inscriptions. The moulded oval base has a drinking bowl on two sides.	II
Concrete footbridge 53.08720°N 0.80476°W		1915	The footbridge crossing the River Trent is in reinforced concrete with stone abutments and steel tube handrails, and it consists of a single segmental arch with a span of 90 feet (27 m). On each side are chamfered walls with rusticated stone-faced abutments and steel tube handrails. On the east side is a rusticated stone embankment with a steel tube handrail.	II*
War memorial 53.07647°N 0.80733°W		1921	The war memorial is in the churchyard of St Mary Magdalene's Church, and is in Portland stone. It has an octagonal base of three steps on which is an octagonal pedestal, and a cross with a tapered shaft, on the east side of which is a bronze sword.	II
22 and 23 Market Place; 53.07632°N 0.80832°W		1935	A shop on a corner site in brick on a marble plinth, with stone dressings, a fascia cornice, and a stepped coped parapet. There are three storeys and fronts of three and six bays. In the ground floor is a modern shop front. In the upper floors, the bays are divided by paired giant Ionic pilasters, and the recesses between contain a cross-casement window, above which is a French window with a wrought iron balcony. The outer bays contain a slim casement window in each floor.	II
Pair of telephone kiosks (northwest); 53.07653°N 0.80936°W		1935	The K6 type telephone kiosk in Market Place were designed by Giles Gilbert Scott. Constructed in cast iron with a square plan and a dome, they have three unperforated crowns in the top panels.	II
Pair of telephone kiosks (southwest); 53.07650°N 0.80939°W		1935	The K6 type telephone kiosk in Market Place were designed by Giles Gilbert Scott. Constructed in cast iron with a square plan and a dome, they have three unperforated crowns in the top panels.	II
