= Castle Brewery, Newark =

Area of Newark-on-Trent in Nottinghamshire, England

Coordinates: 53.0730°N 0.8108°W

Castle Brewery
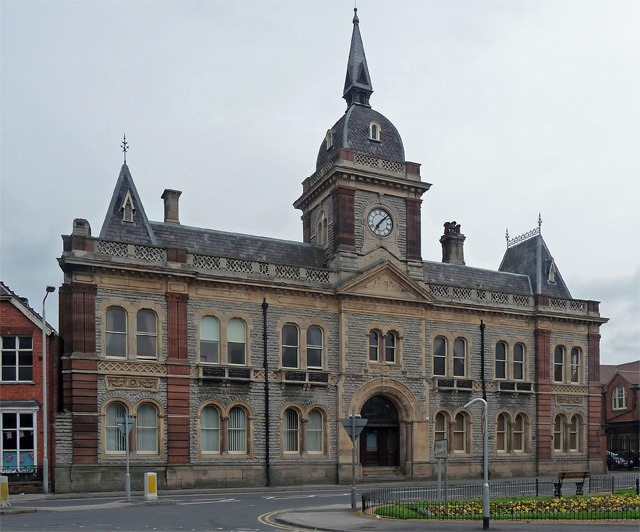
- Brewery offices

- Location within Nottinghamshire
- Population: 386 2011 Census
  - London: 141 mi (227 km) S
- Civil parish: Newark-on-Trent
- District: Newark and Sherwood
- Shire county: Nottinghamshire
- Region: East Midlands
- Country: England
- Sovereign state: United Kingdom
- Post town: Newark-on-Trent
- Postcode district: NG24
- Dialling code: 0163
- Police: Nottinghamshire
- Fire: Nottinghamshire
- Ambulance: East Midlands
- UK Parliament: Newark and Sherwood

Castle Brewery is a mixed-use complex in the town of Newark-on-Trent in the ceremonial county of Nottinghamshire, England. The area covers the former Castle Brewery factory complex in the central part of the town. It was opened in 1885 as a brewery for the town and continued operating until 1982. It was then converted into a mixed-use site of retail units and residential accommodation. The brewery is a Grade II listed building, while an administrative block and a cask store have separate Grade II listings.
