= Newark-on-Trent =

Market town in Nottinghamshire, England

Coordinates: 53°04′36″N 0°48′31″W

- Town and civil parish
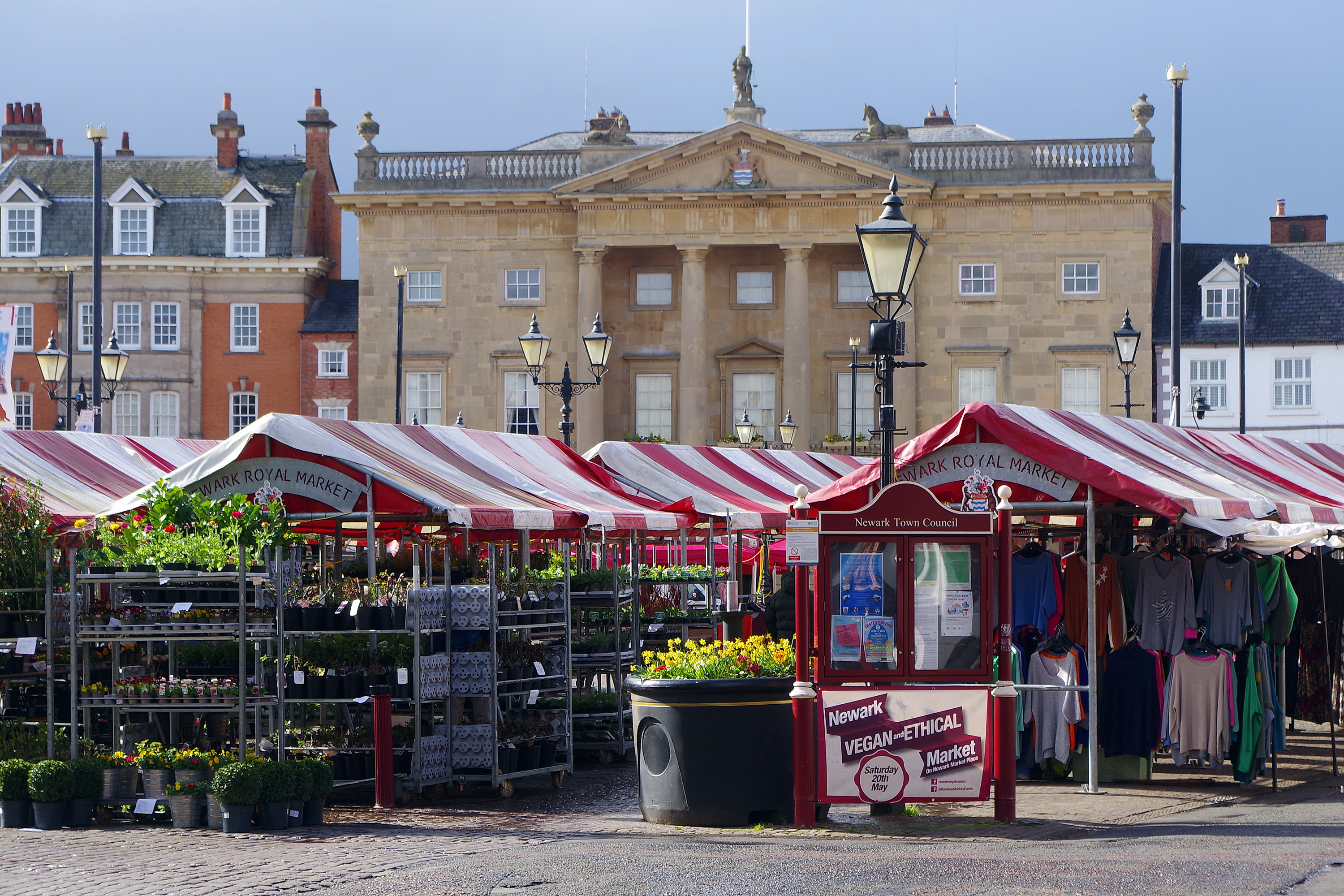
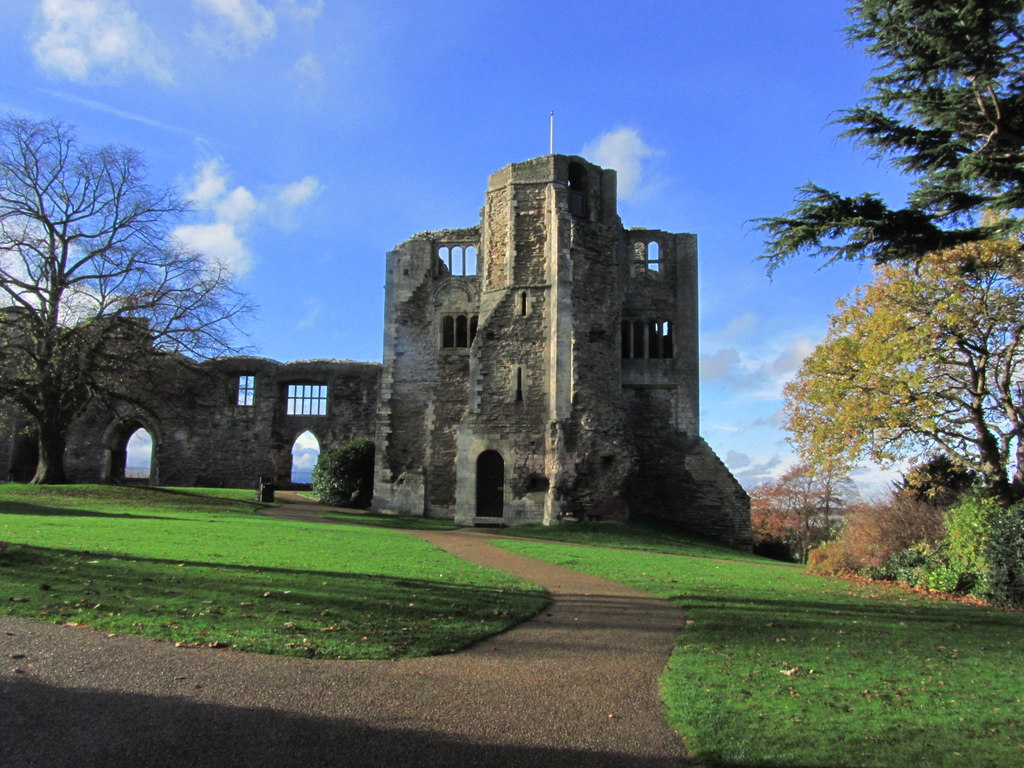
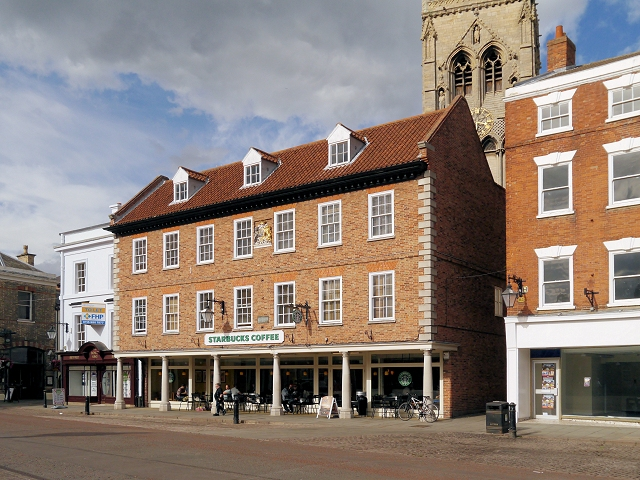
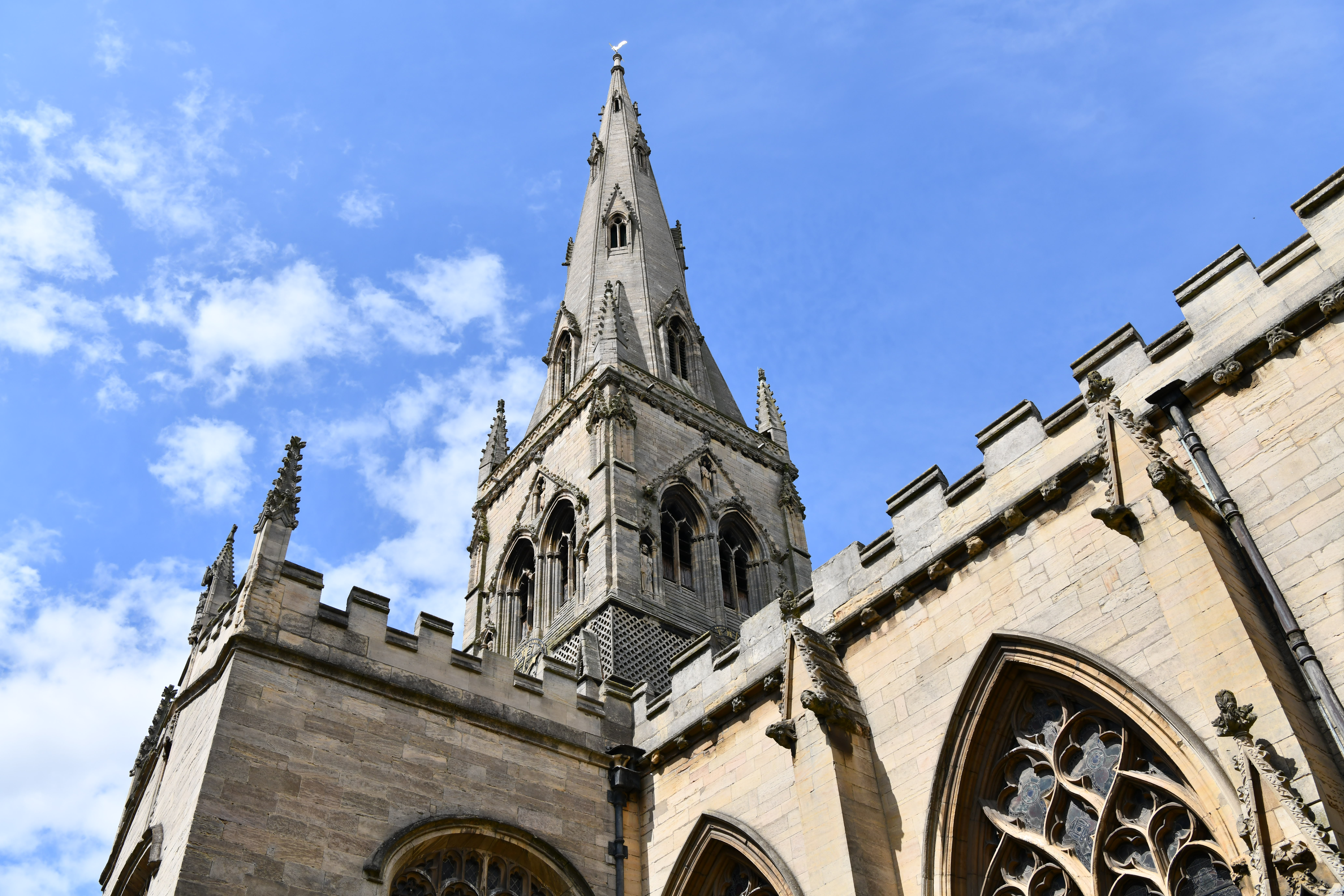
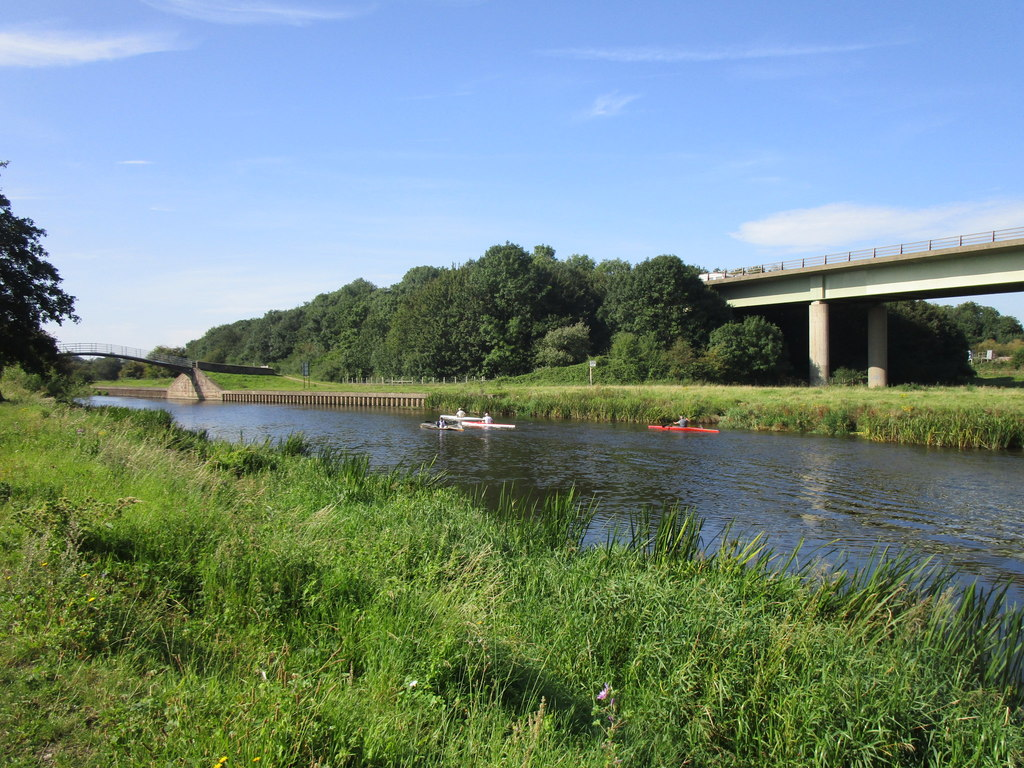
- Town Hall Castle Moot Hall St Mary Magdalene Church River Trent

- Coat of arms

- Location within Nottinghamshire
- Interactive map of Newark-on-Trent
- Area: 6.01 sq mi (15.6 km^{2})
- Population: 30,345 (2021)
  - Density: 5,049/sq mi (1,949/km^{2})
- OS grid reference: SK799539
  - London: 140 mi (230 km) SSE
- Civil parish: Newark
- District: Newark and Sherwood
- Shire county: Nottinghamshire
- Region: East Midlands
- Country: England
- Sovereign state: United Kingdom
- Areas of the town: List: Civil parish: Bridge (Ward); Beacon (Ward); Castle (Ward); Castle Brewery (Ward); Devon (Ward); Magnus (Ward); Sleaford (Ward); External suburbs: Balderton; Coddington; Farndon; Fernwood; Hawton; New Balderton; Winthorpe
- Post town: NEWARK
- Postcode district: NG22–NG24
- Dialling code: 01636
- Police: Nottinghamshire
- Fire: Nottinghamshire
- Ambulance: East Midlands
- UK Parliament: Newark
- Website: www.newark.gov.uk

Newark-on-Trent (/ˌnjuwək/) or Newark is a market town and civil parish in the Newark and Sherwood district, in Nottinghamshire, England. It lies on the river Trent and was historically a major inland port. The A1 road bypasses the town on the line of the ancient Great North Road. The population of the parish was recorded at 30,345 at the 2021 census.

Newark has a marketplace lined with many historical buildings and one of its most notable landmarks is St Mary Magdalene church with its towering spire at 232 ft (71 m) high and the highest structure in the town. The church is the tallest church building in Nottinghamshire and can be seen when entering the town or bypassing it.

== Toponymy ==
The place-name Newark is first attested in the cartulary of Eynsham Abbey in Oxfordshire, where it appears as "Newercha" in about 1054–1057 and "Niweweorche" in about 1075–1092. It appears as "Newerche" in the 1086 Domesday Book. The name "New werk" has the apparent meaning of "New fort".

== History ==
The town's origins are likely to be Roman, as it lies on a major Roman road, the Fosse Way. It grew up around Newark Castle and St Mary Magdalene church; it was later developed as a centre for the wool and cloth trades.

=== Early history ===
The origins of the town are possibly Roman, from its position on an important Roman road, the Fosse Way. In a document which purports to be a charter of 664 AD, Newark is mentioned as having been granted to the Abbey of Peterborough by King Wulfhere of Mercia. An Anglo-Saxon pagan cemetery used from the early fifth to early seventh centuries has been found in Millgate, close to the Fosse Way and the river Trent; cremated remains were buried there in pottery urns.

In the reign of Edward the Confessor, Newark belonged to Godiva and her husband Leofric, Earl of Mercia, who granted it to Stow Minster in 1055. After the Norman Conquest, Stow Minster retained the revenues of Newark, but it came under the control of the Norman Bishop Remigius de Fécamp, after whose death control passed to the Bishops of Lincoln from 1092 until the reign of Edward VI. There were burgesses in Newark at the time of the Domesday survey. The reign of Edward III shows evidence that it had long been a borough by prescription. The Newark wapentake (hundred) in the east of Nottinghamshire was established in the period of Anglo-Saxon rule (10th–11th centuries).

=== Medieval to Stuart period ===
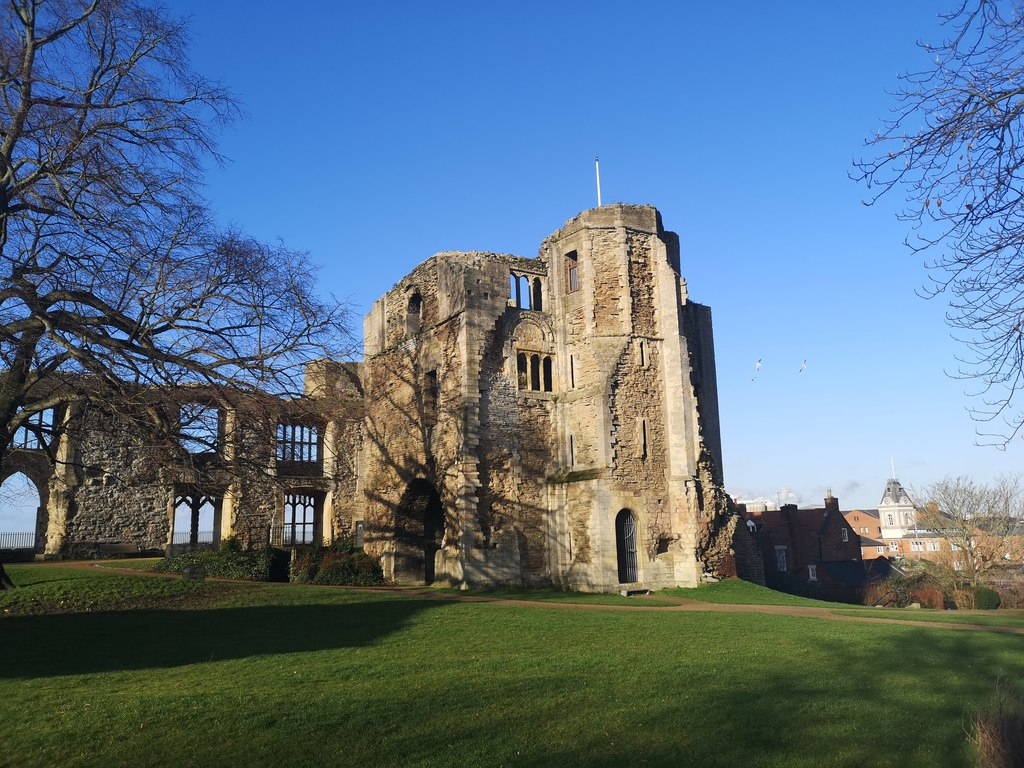
Newark Castle

Newark Castle was originally a fortified manor house founded by the Anglo-Saxon King Edward the Elder. In 1073, Remigius de Fécamp, Bishop of Lincoln, put up an earthwork motte-and-bailey fortress on the site. The river bridge was built about this time under a charter from Henry I, as was St Leonard's Hospital. The bishopric also gained from the king a charter to hold a five-day fair at the castle each year, and under King Stephen to establish a mint. King John died of dysentery in Newark Castle in 1216.

The town became a local centre for the wool and cloth trade – by the time of Henry II a major market was held there. Wednesday and Saturday markets in the town were founded in the period 1156–1329, under a series of charters from the Bishop of Lincoln. After his death, Henry III tried to bring order to the country, but the mercenary Robert de Gaugy refused to yield Newark Castle to the Bishop of Lincoln, its rightful owner. This led to the Dauphin of France (later King Louis VIII of France) laying an eight-day siege on behalf of the king, ended by an agreement to pay the mercenary to leave. Around the time of Edward III's death in 1377, "Poll tax records show an adult population of 1,178, excluding beggars and clergy, making Newark one of the largest 25 or so towns in England."

In 1457, a flood swept away the bridge over the Trent. Although there was no legal requirement to do so, the Bishop of Lincoln, John Chadworth, funded a new bridge of oak with stone defensive towers at either end. In January 1571 or 1572, the composer Robert Parsons fell into the swollen Trent at Newark and drowned.

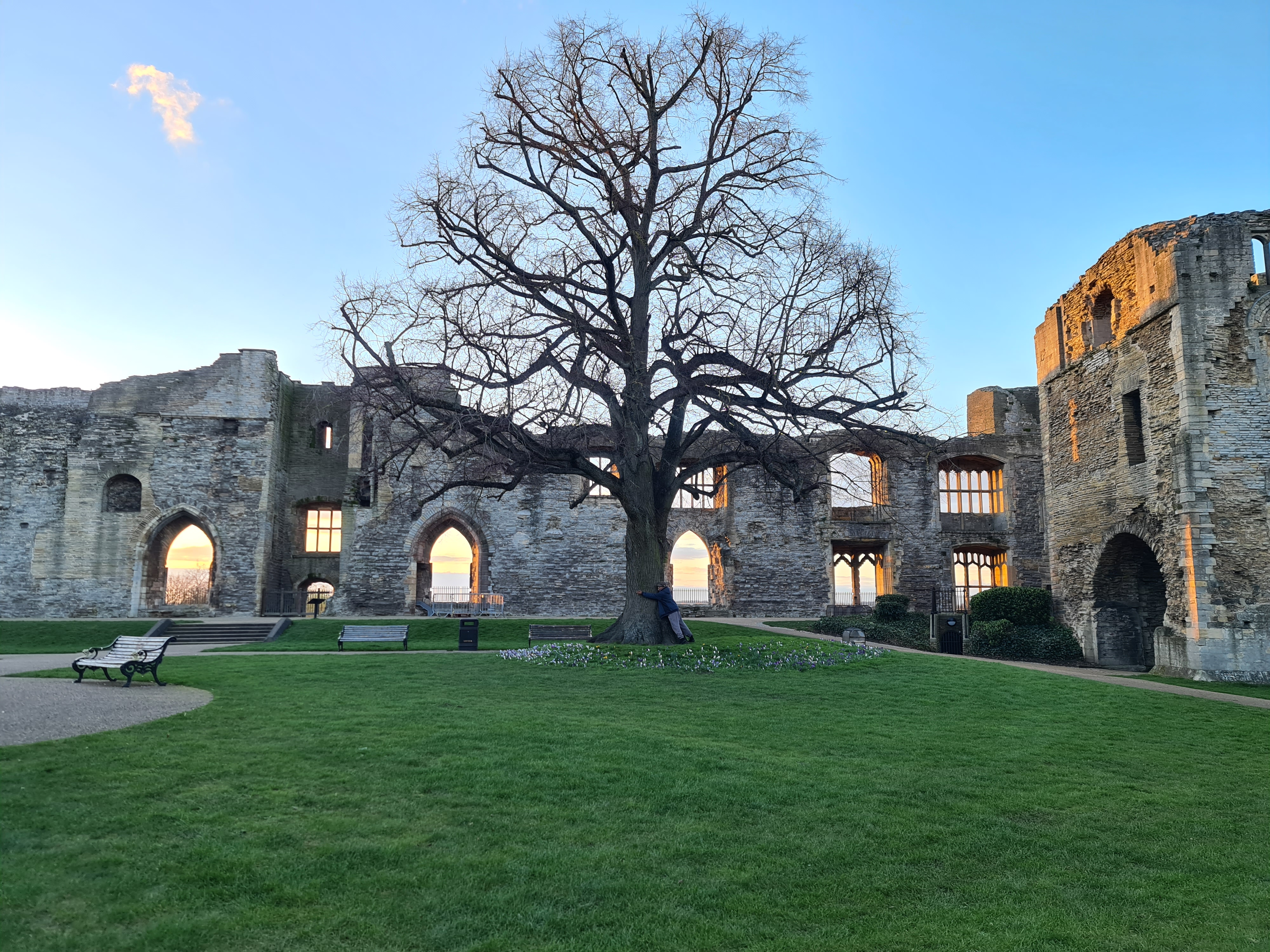
Interior of Newark Castle

After the break with Rome in the 16th century, the establishment of the Church of England, and the dissolution of the monasteries, Henry VIII had the Vicar of Newark, Henry Lytherland, executed for refusing to acknowledge the King as head of the Church. The dissolution affected Newark's political landscape. Even more radical changes came in 1547, when the Bishop of Lincoln exchanged ownership of the town with the Crown. Newark was incorporated under an alderman and twelve assistants in 1549; the charter was confirmed and extended by Elizabeth I.

Charles I reincorporated the town under a mayor and aldermen, owing to its increasing commercial prosperity. This charter, except for a temporary surrender under James II, continued to govern the corporation until the Municipal Corporations Act 1835.

=== The Civil War ===
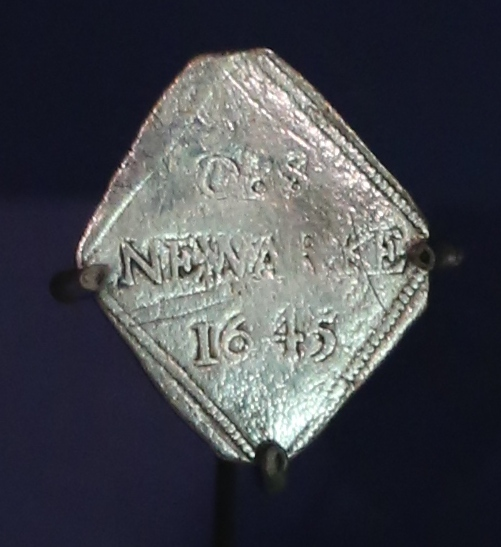
A makeshift royalist shilling (siege piece) made from silver plate in the siege

In the English Civil War, it was besieged by Parliamentary forces and relieved by Royalist forces under Prince Rupert. Newark was a Royalist stronghold, with Charles I having raised his standard in nearby Nottingham. "Newark was besieged on three occasions and finally surrendered only when ordered to do so by the King after his own surrender." It was attacked in February 1643 by two troops of horsemen, but beat them back. The town fielded at times as many as 600 soldiers and raided Nottingham, Grantham, Northampton, Gainsborough and other places with mixed success, but enough to cause it to rise to national notice. In 1644, Newark was besieged by forces from Nottingham, Lincoln and Derby, until relieved in March by Prince Rupert.

Parliament commenced a new siege towards the end of January 1645 after more raiding, but this was relieved about a month later by Sir Marmaduke Langdale. Newark cavalry fought with the king's forces, which were decisively defeated in the Battle of Naseby, near Leicester, in June 1645.

The final siege began in November 1645, by which time the town's defences had been much strengthened. Two major forts had been built just outside the town, one called the Queen's Sconce to the south-west, and another, the King's Sconce, to the north-east; both were close to the river, with defensive walls and a water-filled ditch of 2.25 miles (3.6 km) around the town. The King's May 1646 order to surrender was only accepted under protest by the town's garrison. After that, much of the defences was destroyed, including the castle, which was left in essentially the state it can be seen today. The Queen's Sconce was left largely untouched; its remains are in Sconce and Devon Park.

=== Georgian era and early 19th century ===
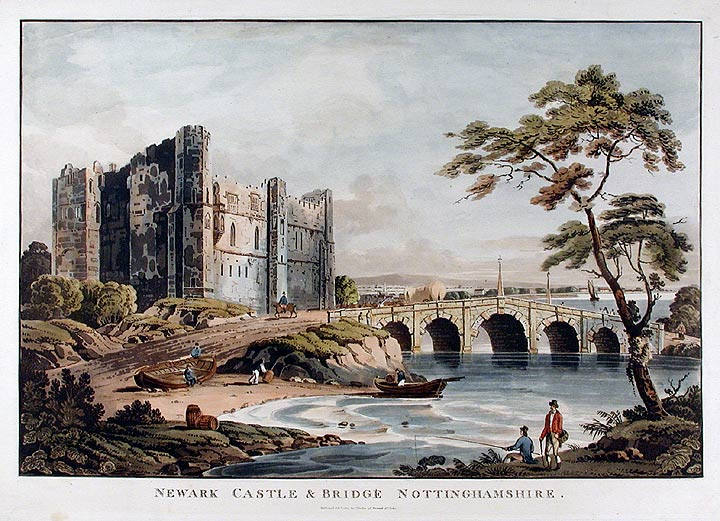
Newark Castle (c. 1812)

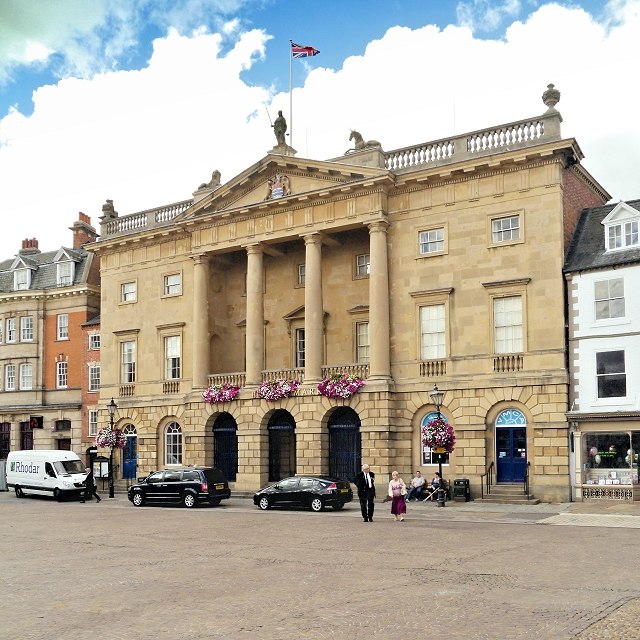
Newark Town Hall, completed in 1776

In about 1770, the Great North Road around Newark (now the A616) was raised on a long series of arches to ensure it remained clear of the regular floods. A special Act of Parliament in 1773 allowed the creation of a town hall next to Market Place. Designed by John Carr of York and completed in 1776, Newark Town Hall is now a Grade I listed building, housing a museum and art gallery. In 1775, the Duke of Newcastle, at the time the Lord of the Manor and a major landowner in the area, built a new brick bridge with stone facing to replace a dilapidated one next to the castle. This is still one of the town's major thoroughfares today.

A noted 18th-century advocate of reform in Newark was the printer and newspaper owner, Daniel Holt (1766–1799). He was imprisoned for printing a leaflet advocating parliamentary reform and for selling a pamphlet by Thomas Paine.

In a milieu of parliamentary reform, the Duke of Newcastle evicted over a hundred Newark tenants whom he believed to support directly or indirectly at the 1829 elections the Liberal/Radical candidate (Wilde), rather than his candidate, Michael Sadler, a progressive Conservative. (Note: See the reports in: a) Cornelius Brown 1907, ii, 243 ff; and b) in The Times for 7 October 1829. A further report in The Times of 10 September 1832 lists ten of the evicted, by name and address.)

A schoolboy in 1830–1840 contributed to a book on the Corn Laws: "Chartists and rioters came from Nottingham into Newark, parading the streets with penny loaves dripped in blood carried on pikes, crying Bread or blood."

=== 19th–21st centuries ===
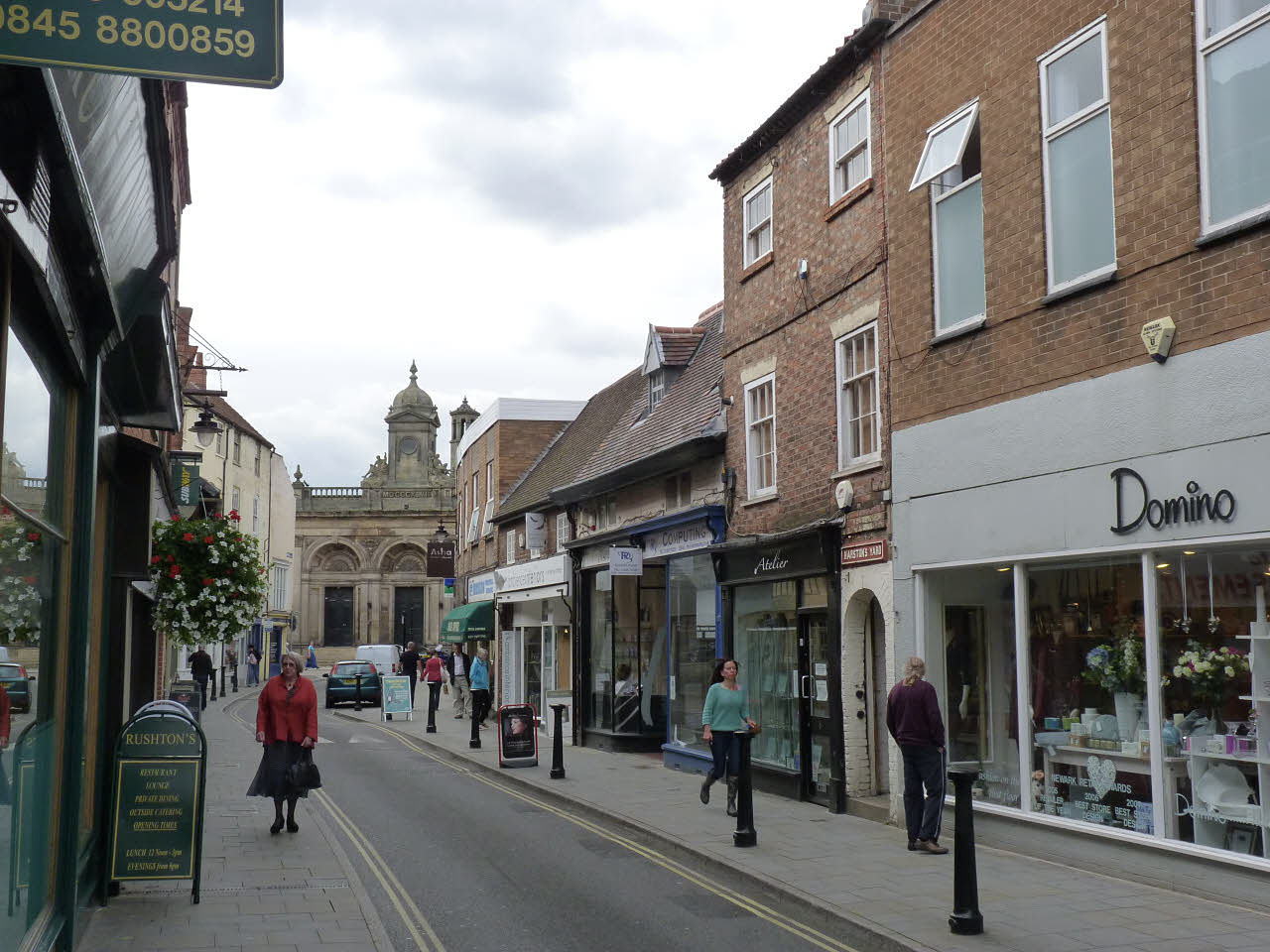
Stodman Street

Many buildings and much industry appeared in the Victorian era; the former included the Independent Chapel (1822), Holy Trinity (1836–1837), Christ Church (1837), Newark Castle station (1846), the Wesleyan Chapel (1846), the Corn Exchange (1848), the Methodist New Connexion Chapel (1848), W. N. Nicholson Trent Ironworks (1840s), Newark Northgate station (1851), North End Wesleyan Chapel (1868), St Leonard's Anglican Church (1873), the Baptist Chapel (1876), the Primitive Methodist Chapel (1878), Newark Hospital (1881), Ossington Coffee Palace (1882), Gilstrap Free Library (1883), the Market Hall (1884), the Unitarian Chapel (1884), the Fire Station (1889), the Waterworks (1898), and the School of Science and Art (1900).

The Ossington Coffee Palace was built by Lady Charlotte Ossington, daughter of the 4th Duke of Portland and widow of a former Speaker of the House of Commons, Viscount Ossington. It was designed to be a Temperance alternative to pubs and coaching inns.

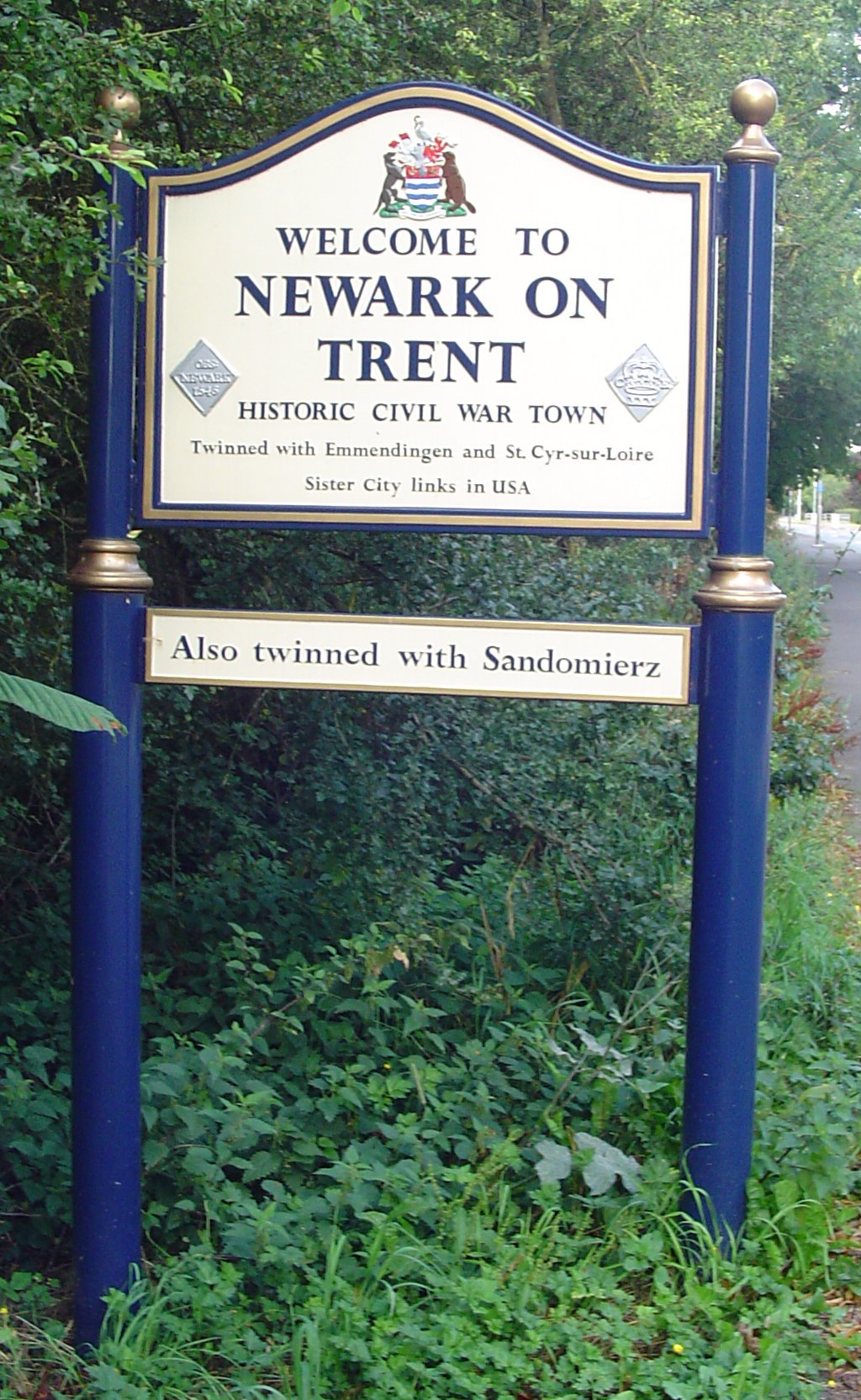
Signpost in Newark-on-Trent

These changes and industrial growth raised the population from under 7,000 in 1800 to over 15,000 by the end of the century. The Sherwood Avenue Drill Hall opened in 1914, as the First World War began.

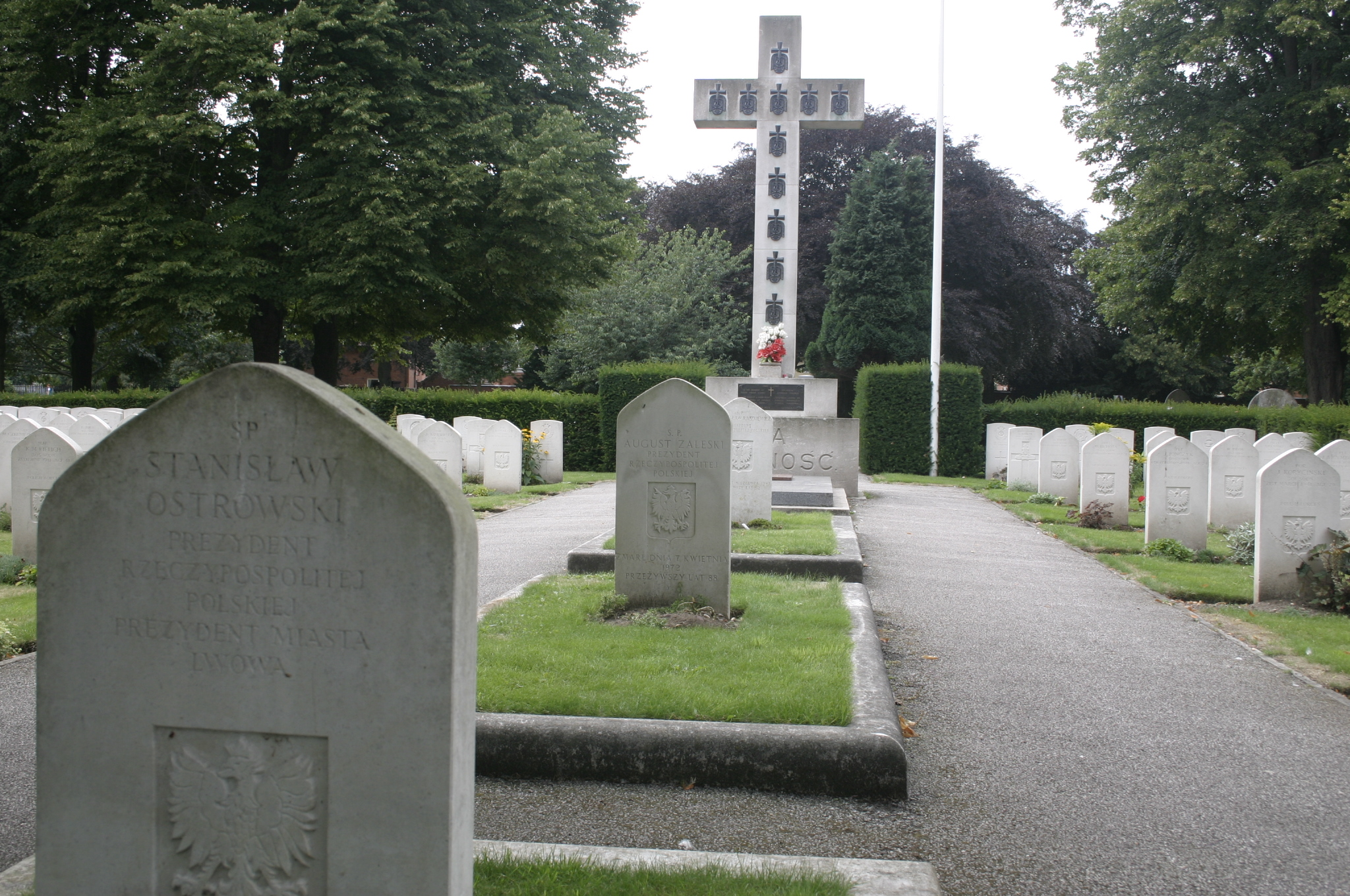
Polish war memorial in Newark Cemetery, with the graves of three Polish presidents-in-exile in the foreground

In the Second World War, there were several RAF stations within a few miles of Newark, many holding squadrons of the Polish Air Force. A plot was set aside in Newark Cemetery for RAF burials. This is now the war graves plot, where all but ten of the 90 Commonwealth and all of the 397 Polish burials were made. The cemetery also has 49 scattered burials from the First World War. A memorial cross to the Polish airmen buried there was unveiled in 1941 by President Raczkiewicz of the Polish Republic and head of the wartime Polish government in London; they were supported by Władysław Sikorski, head of the Polish Armed Forces in the West and prime minister of the Polish Government in Exile in 1939–1943. When the two died, Sikorski in 1943 and Raczkiewicz in 1947, they were buried at the foot of the monument. Sikorski's remains were returned to Poland in 1993, but his former grave in Newark remained as a monument. In 2025, Newark city council returned Sikorski's tombstone to Poland. RAF Winthorpe was opened in 1940 and declared inactive in 1959. The site is now the location of the Newark Air Museum.

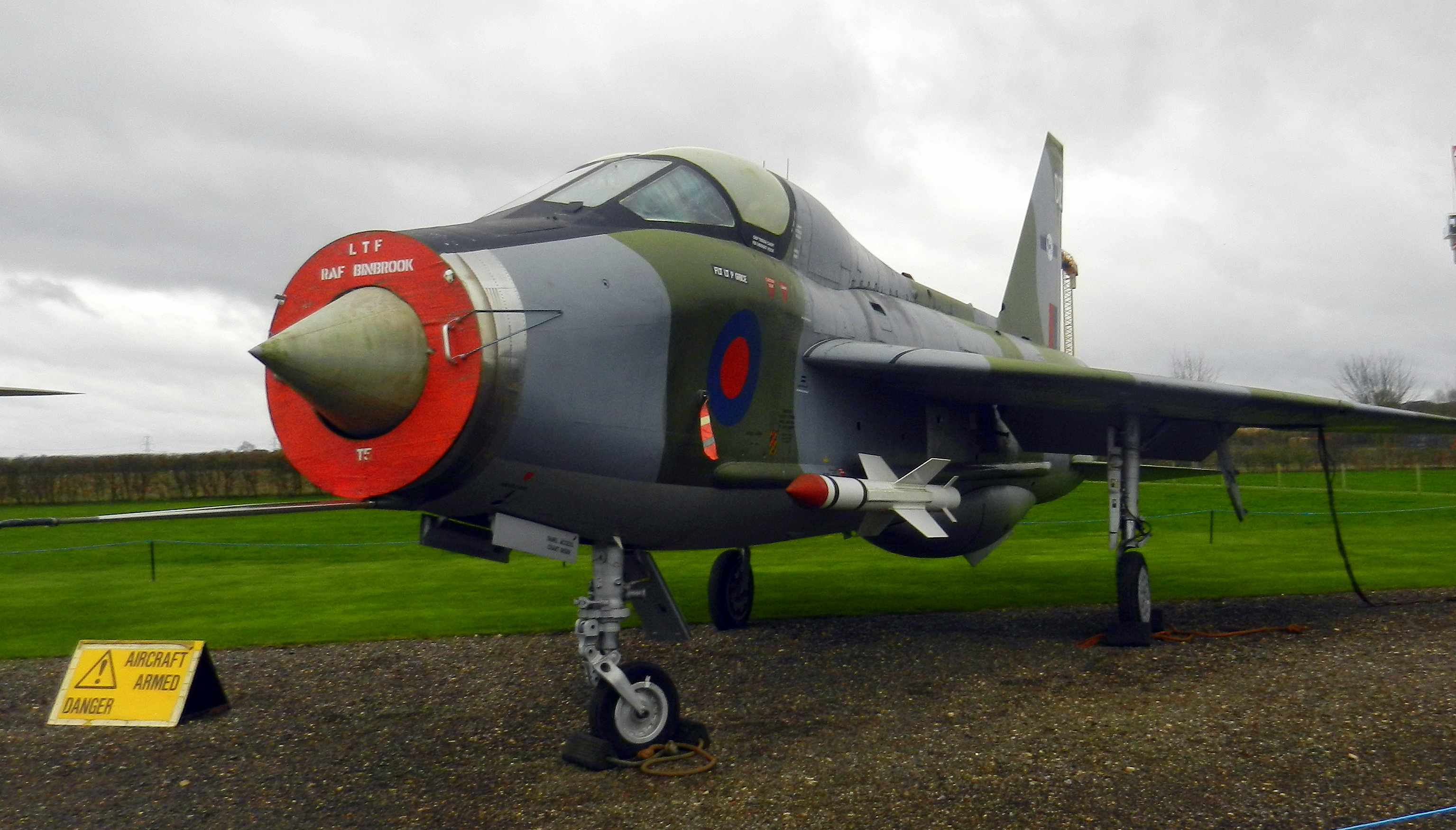
An English Electric Lightning at Newark Air Museum

The main industries in Newark in the last hundred years have been clothing, bearings, pumps, agricultural machinery and pine furniture, along with the refining of sugar. British Sugar still has one of its sugar beet processing factories to the north of the town, near the A616 (Great North Road). There have been several factory closures especially since the 1950s. The breweries that closed in the 20th century included James Hole and Warwicks & Richardsons.

== Population ==
Newark had a population of 30,345 at the 2021 census, a 10% increase from the 27,700 of the 2011 census. The ONS Mid Year Population Estimates for 2007 indicated that the population had risen to some 26,700. (Note: Another estimate (2009): "The population of Newark itself was 27,700 and the district of Newark and Sherwood has a population of 75,000 at the 2011 Census.) The Office for National Statistics also identifies a wider Newark-on-Trent built up area with a 2011 census population of 43,363 and an area subdivision with a population of 37,084. (Note: Citations include maps of the area.) In the 2011 census, 77% of adults in the town were employed.

== Geography ==
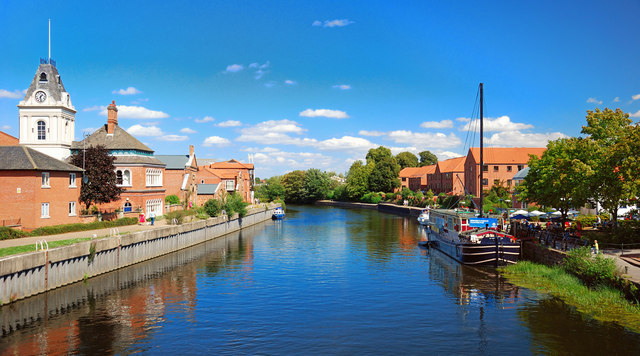
The river Trent

By road, Newark is 21 miles (34 km) from Nottingham, 19 miles (31 km) from Lincoln and 40 miles (64 km) from Leicester. Locally, the town lies 11 miles (18 km) from Bingham, 14 miles (23 km) from Grantham, 20 miles (32 km) from Mansfield, 19 miles (31 km) from Retford, 19 miles (31 km) from Sleaford and 9 miles (14 km) from Southwell.

Newark lies on the bank of the river Trent, with the river Devon running as a tributary through the town. Standing at the intersection of the Great North Road and the Fosse Way, Newark originally grew around the castle, now ruined, and a large market place now lined with historic buildings. It forms a single built-up area with the neighbouring parish of Balderton to the south-east; Farndon lies to the south, on the A46 road, and Winthorpe is to the north.

Newark's growth and development have been enhanced by one of few bridges over the Trent, by the navigability of the river, by the presence of the Great North Road and later by the advance of the railways, bringing a junction between the East Coast Main Line and the Nottingham to Lincoln line. "Newark became a substantial inland port, particularly for the wool trade," though it industrialised somewhat in the Victorian era and later had an ironworks, engineering, brewing and a sugar refinery.

== Governance ==
=== National representation ===
The parliamentary constituency returned two Members of Parliament (MPs) to the Unreformed House of Commons from 1673. It was the last borough to be created before the Reform Act. William Ewart Gladstone, later prime minister, became its MP in 1832 and was re-elected in 1835, in 1837 and twice in 1841; this was possibly due to his support of the repeal of the Corn Laws and other issues. He stood elsewhere after that time.

Newark elections were central to two interesting legal cases. In 1945, a challenge to Harold Laski, the Chairman of the National Executive Committee of the Labour Party, led Laski to sue the Daily Express, which had reported him as saying Labour might take power by violence if defeated at the polls. Laski vehemently denied saying this, but lost the action. In the 1997 general election, Newark returned Fiona Jones of the Labour Party. Jones and her election agent Des Whicher were convicted of submitting a fraudulent declaration of expenses, but the conviction was overturned on appeal.

Newark's former MP, Patrick Mercer of the Conservatives, held the position of Shadow Minister for Homeland Security from June 2003 until March 2007, when he had to resign after making racially contentious comments to The Times.

At a by-election on 5 June 2014 after the resignation of Patrick Mercer, he was replaced by the Conservative Robert Jenrick, who was re-elected at the general election of 7 May 2015. In January 2026, Jenrick was sacked from his shadow cabinet role and removed from the Conservative Party after his plans to defect to Reform UK became known to the party leadership. He then joined Reform later the same day.

=== Local government ===
Newark has three local government tiers: Newark Town Council, Newark and Sherwood District Council and Nottinghamshire County Council. The 39 district councillors cover waste, planning, environmental health, licensing, car parks, housing, leisure and culture. It opened a national Civil War Centre and Newark Museum in May 2015. The area elects ten councillors to Nottinghamshire County Council. It provides children's services, adult care, and highways and transport services.

The town has an elected council of 18 members from seven wards: Beacon (5 councillors), Bridge (3), Castle (2), Devon (5), Magnus (1), Sleaford (1) and South (1). Newark Town Council has taken on some responsibilities devolved by Newark and Sherwood District Council, including parks, open spaces and the narket. It also runs events such as the LocAle and Weinfest, a museum in the Town Hall, and allotments.

A new police station costing £7 million opened in October 2006.

== Education ==
The town has three main mixed secondary schools:

- The oldest, Magnus Church of England Academy, founded in 1531 by the diplomat Thomas Magnus, lies close to the town centre.
- The Newark Academy is in neighbouring Balderton (previously The Grove School). It underwent a £25 million rebuild in 2016 after a long campaign.
- In 2020, the Suthers School was opened.

The town's several primary schools include a new school in the Middlebeck development on the town's southern edge, opened in September 2021.

Newark College, part of the Lincoln College Group, is situated on Friary Road where it is home to the School of Musical Instrument Crafts. This school, which opened in 1972, has courses to train craftspeople to make and repair guitars, violins and woodwind instruments, and to tune and restore pianos.

== Economy ==
British Sugar runs a mill on the outskirts that opened in 1921. It has 130 permanent employees and processes 1.6 million tonnes of sugar beet produced by about 800 UK growers, at an average distance of 28 miles (45 km) from the factory. Of the output, 250,000 tonnes are processed and supplied to food and drink manufacturers in the UK and across Europe. At the heart of the Newark factory's operations is a combined heat and power (CHP) plant, with boilers fuelled by natural gas to meet the site's steam and electricity requirements and contribute to the grid enough power for 800 homes. The installation is rated under the government CHP environmental quality-assurance scheme.

Other major employers are:

- Ransome & Marles, with some 200 employees
- Laurens Patisseries, part of the food group Bakkavör since May 2006, which bought it for £130 million; it employs over 1,000
- Currys opened a £30 million national distribution centre, next to the A17 near the A46 roundabout, in 2007; it moved its national distribution centre there in 2005, with over 1,400 staff employed at the site at peak times
- Flowserve, formerly Ingersoll Dresser Pumps, has a manufacturing facility in the town
- Project Telecom in Brunel Drive was bought by Vodafone in 2003 for a reported £163 million.

Since 1985, the town has been host to the biggest antiques outlet in Europe, the Newark International Antiques and Collectors Fair, held every two months at Newark Showground. Newark has several antique shops and centres.

== Places of interest ==
- The Market Place is the town's focal point; it includes The Queen's Head, one of the town's old pubs
- The Church of St. Mary Magdalene is a Grade I listed building notable for its tower and octagonal spire (236 feet (72 m) high), the tallest in the county for a church. It was heavily restored in the mid-19th century by Sir George Gilbert Scott. The reredos was added by Sir Ninian Comper.
- Newark Castle was built by the Trent by Alexander of Lincoln, the Bishop of Lincoln in 1123, who established it as a mint. Of the original Norman stronghold, the chief remains are the gate-house, a crypt and the tower at the south-west angle. King John died there on the night of 18 October 1216. In the reign of Edward III, it was being used as a state prison. In the English Civil War, it was garrisoned for Charles I and endured three sieges. Its dismantling was begun in 1646, after the royalist surrender.
- National Civil War Centre - Newark Museum on Appleton Gate
- The 16th-century Governor's House, named after Sir Richard Willis, Castle Governor in the English Civil War, is in Stodman Street. It is a Grade I listed building, housing a bread shop and café.

=== Newark Torc ===
The Newark Torc, a silver and gold Iron Age torc, was the first found in Nottinghamshire. It resembles that of the Snettisham Hoard. Uncovered in 2005, it occupies a field on the town's outskirts and, in 2008, was acquired by Newark and Sherwood District Council. The torc was displayed at the British Museum in London until the opening of the National Civil War Centre and Newark Museum in May 2015; it is now shown in the museum galleries.

== Religious sites ==
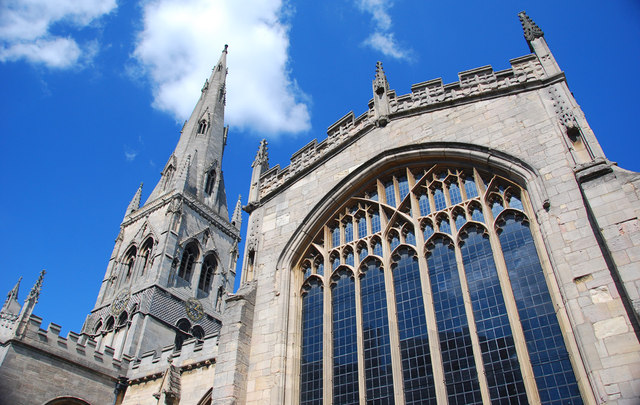
Church of St Mary Magdalene

Newark's churches include the Grade I listed parish church, St Mary Magdalene. Other Anglican sites include Christ Church in Boundary Road and St Leonard's in Lincoln Road. The Catholic Holy Trinity Church was consecrated in 1979.

Other places of worship include three Methodist churches, the Baptist Church in Albert Street, and the Church of Promise, founded in 2007.

In 2014, the Newark Odinist Temple, a Grade II listed building in Bede House Lane, was consecrated according to the rites of the Odinist Fellowship, making it the first heathen temple operating in England in modern times.

== Transport ==
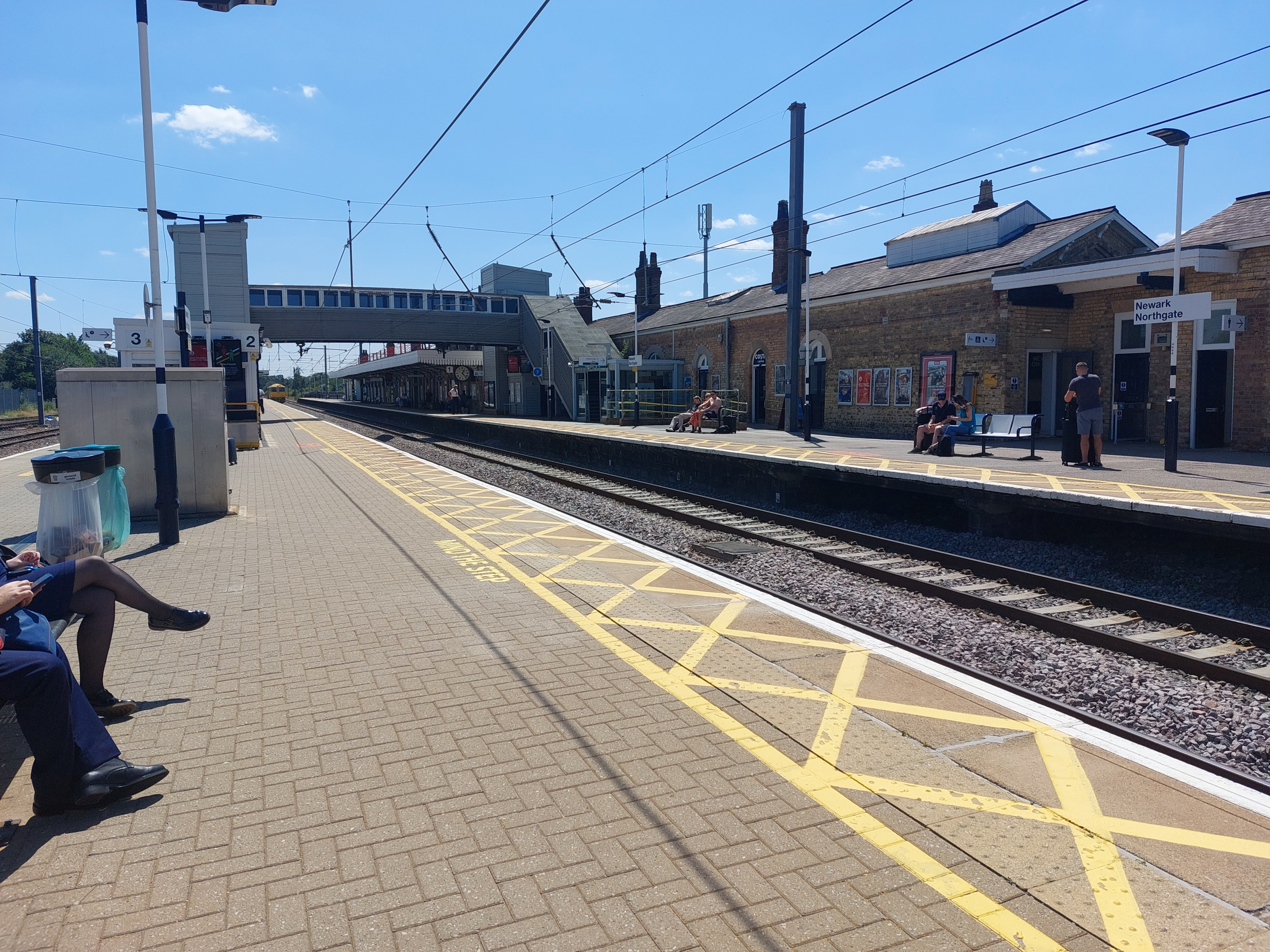
Northgate station

Newark is a commuter town, with many residents travelling to Lincoln, Nottingham and London.

=== Railways ===
The town has two railway stations:

- Newark Northgate lies on the East Coast Main Line. London North Eastern Railway operates inter-city services to London King's Cross (in 75 minutes), Leeds, Hull Paragon, Newcastle and Edinburgh Waverley
- Newark Castle is on the Nottingham to Lincoln Line; East Midlands Railway provides cross-country regional links to Crewe, Nottingham, Lincoln, Matlock and Cleethorpes.

The two routes cross at the last flat crossing in Britain. Grade separation has been proposed.

=== Buses ===
Newark bus station is the focal point for local services; operators include Stagecoach East Midlands, Nottingham City Transport, Marshalls, Centrebus (North) and CT4N. Routes connect the town with Nottingham, Mansfield, Grantham, Lincoln and Retford.

=== Roads ===
The main roads of Newark include the A1 and A46 as bypasses. The A17 runs east to King's Lynn in Norfolk, and the A616 north to Huddersfield in West Yorkshire.

The A1 bypass was opened in 1964 by the Minister of Transport, Ernest Marples. The single-carriageway A46 opened in October 1990. Following years of planning, preparatory work started in 2023 to create an extension and bypass-link from the A46 at Farndon, via Middlebeck, to the A1 near Fernwood. In June 2026, National Highways cancelled a £297m contract with contractor Skanska to rethink the A46 project and help fund the UK Government's defence budget, only for procurement of the project to be restarted, with a higher price tag (£700m), in September 2026.

== Culture ==
Newark and Sherwood Concert Band, with over 50 regular players, has performed at numerous area events in the last few years. Also based in Newark are the Royal Air Force Music Charitable Trust and Lincolnshire Chamber Orchestra.

The Palace Theatre in Appletongate is Newark's main entertainment venue, offering drama, live music, dance and film.

The National Civil War Centre and Newark Museum, next to the Palace Theatre in Appletongate in the town centre, opened in 2015 to interpret Newark's part in the English Civil War in the 17th century and explore its wider implications.

The district was ranked in a survey reported in 2020 as one of the best places to live in the UK.

== Media ==
The town's weekly Newark Advertiser, founded in 1854, is owned by Newark Advertiser Co Ltd, which also publishes local newspapers in Southwell and Bingham.

Local radio stations are BBC Radio Nottingham on 95.1 FM, Capital Midlands on 96.2 FM, Smooth Radio East Midlands on 106.6 FM, Hits Radio Lincolnshire also covers the area on DAB. Its community station, Radio Newark, began broadcasting on 107.8 FM in May 2015, after three successful trials in 2014 and 2015. It replaced a community station, Boundary Sound, which ceased broadcasting in 2011.

Local news and television programmes are provided by BBC East Midlands and ITV Central from the Waltham TV transmitter. The Belmont TV transmitter can also be received in the town which broadcast BBC Yorkshire and Lincolnshire and ITV Yorkshire.

== Sport and leisure ==
Newark rugby union club's players have included Dusty Hare, John Wells, Greig Tonks and Tom Ryder.

The town has a leisure centre in Bowbridge Road, opened in 2016.

== Notable people ==
Actors

- Arthur Leslie (1899–1970) – actor and playwright, born in Newark and who starred in Coronation Street
- Sir Donald Wolfit (1902–1968) – Shakespearean actor
- Terence Longdon (1922–2011) – screen actor
- Norman Pace (born 1953) – actor and comedian, best known as part of the duo Hale and Pace
- Toby Kebbell (born 1982) – actor educated at the Grove School who starred in For All Mankind TV Series and Dawn of the Planet of the Apes.
- Nathan Foad (born 1992) – actor and writer who starred in Death Valley.

Armed forces

- John Cartwright (1740–1824), naval officer, militia major and political reformer educated in Newark.
- Gonville Bromhead (1845–1891), army officer and Victoria Cross recipient educated at Magnus Grammar School

Fine arts

- William Cubley (1816–1896) – artist settled in Newark
- William Caparne (1855–1940) – botanical artist and horticulturalist born in Newark
- William Nicholson (1872–1949) – painter and illustrator born in Newark
- Edith Scales (1892‍–‍1967) painter who was born in Newark
- Vaughan Grylls (born 1943) – artist and photographer was born in Newark.

Literature

- Henry Constable (1562–1613) – poet (early sonneteer) born in Newark
- John Barnard (died 1683) – biographer and religious writer, who died in Newark
- Winifred Gales (1761–1839) – novelist and memoirist
- T.W. Robertson (1829–1871) – playwright and innovative stage director
- George Allen (1832–1907) – engraver and publisher born in Newark
- Cornelius Brown (1852–1907) – journalist and historian, Newark Advertiser
- Rupert Sheldrake (born 1942) – author and biochemist.
- Matt Haig (born 1975) – author and journalist grew up in the town

Music

- John Blow (1649–1708) – composer and organist
- Archie Camden (1888–1979) – bassoonist, born in Stodman Street, Newark
- Ian Burden (born 1957) – keyboard player with the Human League
- Jay McGuiness (born 1990) – singer with The Wanted.

Politicians

- King John of England (1166–1216) – died in Newark.
- Robert Constable (1522–1591) – parliamentarian and soldier
- Robert Heron (1765–1854) – Whig politician.
- William Robert Bousfield (1854–1943) – Conservative politician, lawyer and psychologist born in Newark
- Arthur Richardson (1860–1936) – Liberal/Labour politician who attended Magnus Grammar School.
- Sir Bryce Chudleigh Burt (1881–1943) – administrator in the British Raj born in Newark
- Ted Bishop (1920–1984) – Labour politician, created Baron Bishopston of Newark in the County of Nottinghamshire
- Richard Alexander (1934–2008) – Conservative politician
- Patrick Mercer (born 1956) – Conservative politician, MP for Newark 2001–2014
- Fiona Jones (1957–2007) – Labour politician, MP for Newark
- Nigel Doughty (1957–2012) – former assistant treasurer of the Labour Party. Former Nottingham Forest Football Club owner, born in Newark
- Robert Jenrick (born 1982) – Reform politician, MP for Newark since June 2014

Religion

- Alexander of Lincoln (died 1148) – Bishop of Lincoln, founded a hospital for lepers in Newark.
- John Burdett Wittenoom (1788–1855) – pioneer cleric and headmaster in Swan River Colony, Australia, born in Newark.
- Annette Cooper (born 1953) – Anglican Archdeacon of Colchester, educated at Lilley and Stone Girls' High School

Science and technology

- John Arderne (1307–1392) – notable surgeon, lived in Newark in early life.
- Giovanni Francisco Vigani (c. 1650–1712) – chemist from Verona, who first settled in Newark in 1682
- Francis Clater (1756–1823) – farrier and veterinary writer
- Frederick Smeeton Williams (1829–1886) – railway writer.
- Basil Baily (1869–1942) – architect
- Godfrey Hounsfield (1919–2004) – electrical engineer, awarded the Nobel Prize in Physiology or Medicine, inventor of the CT scanner
- Rupert Sheldrake (born 1942) – biochemist and parapsychology researcher born in Newark

Sport

- William Streets (born 1772, fl. 1792–1803) – cricketer
- Henry Slater (1839–1905) – first-class cricketer, born in Newark
- Harry Hall (born 1893 – death date unknown) – footballer
- Willie Hall (1912–1967) – Notts County, Tottenham Hotspur and England footballer
- Dusty Hare (born 1952) – rugby union international
- Steve Baines (born 1954) – league footballer and referee
- Phil Joslin (born 1959) – league football referee
- Mary King (née Thomson, born 1961) – Olympic equestrian
- Mark Smalley (born 1965) – footballer, born in Newark
- Shane Nicholson (born 1970) – league footballer
- Sam McMahon (born 1976) – professional association footballer
- Craig Dudley (born 1979) – footballer
- Adam Dixon (born 1986) hockey player, grew up in the town
- David Avanesyan (born 15 August 1988) – boxer
- Chad Sugden (born 27 April 1994) – boxer, born in Newark.
- Amy Hunt (born 2002) - athlete

== International relations ==
Since 1984, Newark has been twinned with:

- Emmendingen, Germany
- Saint-Cyr-sur-Loire, France
- Sandomierz, Poland.

== Arms ==
Coat of arms of Newark-on-Trent Town Council
Notes Originally granted to the Borough of Newark-on-Trent on 8 December 1561. Crest On a wreath Argent and Azure a morfex Argent beaked Sable holding in its beak an eel Proper Torse Gules doubled Argent. Escutcheon Barry wavy of six Argent and Azure on a chief Gules a peacock in his pride Proper between a fleur-de-lis on the dexter and a lion passant guardant on the sinister Or Supporters On the dexter side an otter and on the sinister side a beaver the latter langued Gules Motto Deo Fretus Erumpe (Trust God And Sally)

== See also ==
- Listed buildings in Newark-on-Trent
