= Fernwood, Nottinghamshire =

Village in Nottinghamshire, England

Coordinates: 53.04°N 0.77°W

Fernwood
- Village and civil parish
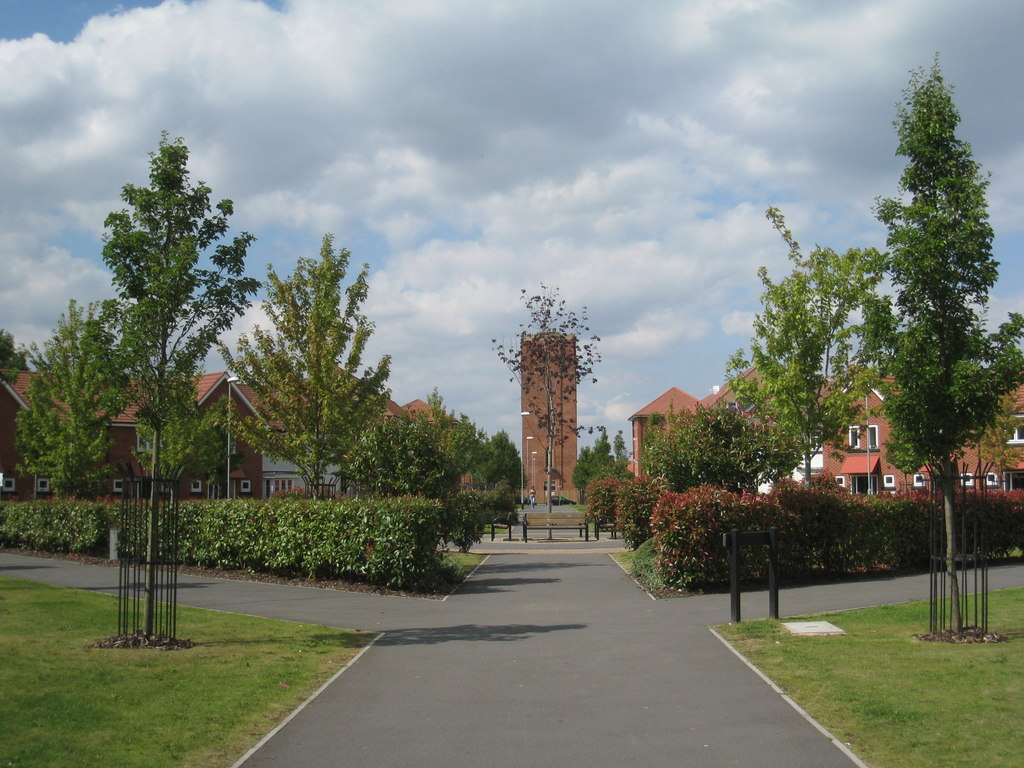
- Rubys Walk

- Location within Nottinghamshire
- Interactive map of Fernwood
- Area: 3.16 sq mi (8.2 km^{2})
- Population: 3,059 (2021)
  - Density: 968/sq mi (374/km^{2})
- OS grid reference: SK 826505
  - London: 110 mi (180 km) SSE
- District: Newark and Sherwood
- Shire county: Nottinghamshire
- Region: East Midlands
- Country: England
- Sovereign state: United Kingdom
- Post town: Newark
- Postcode district: NG24
- Dialling code: 01636
- Police: Nottinghamshire
- Fire: Nottinghamshire
- Ambulance: East Midlands
- UK Parliament: Newark
- Website: www.fernwood-pc.co.uk

Fernwood is a village and civil parish in the Newark and Sherwood district of Nottinghamshire, England. The parish, which then included Balderton, had a population of 10,298 in 2001. It is a suburb of Newark-on-Trent.The population of the civil parish was given as 2,190 in the 2011 census, Balderton by that time was a separate civil parish. Fernwood itself increased to 3,054 at the 2021 census.

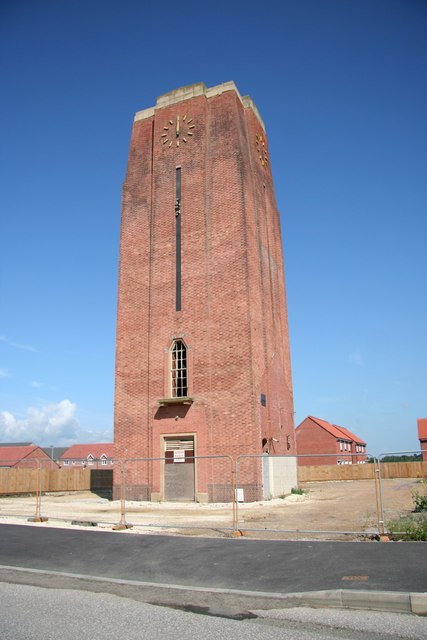
1930s Art deco former hospital chimney nicknamed 'the water tower'

Modern Fernwood expansion has taken place on the site of the old Balderton Hospital which closed in 1993, with street names based on names of former hospital wards and employees.

Following years of planning, preparatory work was started in 2023 to create an extension and bypass-link from the A1 road near Fernwood, via Middlebeck to the A46 at Farndon.
