= Magnus Church of England Academy =

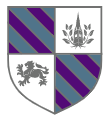

Location
- Earp Avenue; Newark-on-Trent, Nottinghamshire, NG24 4HU; England; 53°04′01″N 0°48′00″W9

Information
- Type: Academy
- Religious affiliation: Church of England
- Established: 1532; 494 years ago
- Founder: Thomas Magnus
- Department for Education URN: 140549 Tables
- Ofsted: Reports
- Chair: Chair of Governors M O'Connell
- Head teacher: A Martin
- Age: 11 to 18
- Enrolment: 729 (including 16-19 study programmes)
- Website: http://www.magnusacademy.co.uk/

Magnus Church of England Academy (formerly Magnus Church of England School and Magnus Grammar School before that) often abbreviated as 'Magnus', is a British secondary school located in the market town of Newark-on-Trent, in Nottinghamshire, England. It was founded as a grammar school by the 16th-century English diplomat and cleric Thomas Magnus; the original school building, located in Appletongate by the church, is now The Civil War museum.

== History ==
=== Foundation ===
The original school was "founded by Thomas Magnus in 1532."

"The original endowment of land and property was provided by Thomas Magnus, Archdeacon of the East Riding in the Metropolitan Church of York circa 1530."

"One of Newark's most important benefactors, Thomas Magnus, built between 1529 and 1532 the Magnus School, containing schools for teaching grammar and music, and established and funded trusts for their staffing and maintenance, as well as for other charitable purposes in the town. This was by no means the first school in Newark, but it is certainly the only such institution still surviving from that time, albeit in somewhat newer premises (1909) than the original - the original building is now a part of the national Civil War Museum."

Over the school entrance in Newark it reads "this grammar school was founded by the reverend Thomas Magnus, 1529."

"The Free Grammar school was founded in 1530, by Dr. Thomas Magnus, Archdeacon of the East Riding of Yorkshire, and a native of Newark, who, by will in 1550, bequeathed lands for the support of a "school of grammar and a school of song." The income, amounting to nearly £2400, is thus appropriated: to the grammar school, £270; to the song school, £105; to ten singing boys, £37. 16.; to national schools, £150; to a dispensary, £150; to the commissioners for lighting, paving, and improving the town, £290; and to the churchwardens for the repair of the church, clerk's and sexton's salaries, &c., £750; besides incidental disbursements. There are two exhibitions of £80 per annum each, connected with the school, which are continued for three years to those who are elected to them."

=== Grammar school ===
The school on Earp Avenue was built in 1909. In the 1950s, the school had around 450 boys, and had the same by the 1970s, with 100 in the sixth form. The girls' grammar school was called the Lilley & Stone Girls' High School, which was on London Road. The current Grove School was a secondary modern school.

=== Comprehensive ===
In 1977, a voluntary controlled comprehensive school, opened on the grounds of the Magnus Boys' Grammar School also known as the Thomas Magnus School on Earp Avenue. It was a co-educational 8-form entry school for ages 14–18, with 600 boys and girls, and 130 in the sixth form. It was originally planned to go comprehensive in 1976, and was planned to be known as the Magnus Upper School. The headmaster was Mr Jack Potter, an.old Magnusian who had taught at the school since 1959 and served as deputy head sinde 1966. The Lilley and Stone School eventually the Newark High School, having become a co-educational comprehensive for ages 14–18. Newark High School closed in 2008 and the site is now awaiting redevelopment, following a period of use by The Newark Academy.

By the 1980s it was known as the Thomas Magnus (Controlled) Upper School. Mr Potter retired in 1980. Also in Newark was the Magdalene High School, a lower school (ages 11–14), on Barnby Road. The Grove School was twice the size of the Magnus School.

The Magdalene High School combined with the Thomas Magnus School in 1997 to form the current school, but essentially the Magdalene High School was closed. The school went into special measures in May 2008.

=== Academy ===
The school converted to academy status on 1 February 2014 and was renamed Magnus Church of England Academy. The school is now sponsored by the Diocese of Southwell and Nottingham, but continues to coordinate with Nottinghamshire County Council for admissions.

== Notable former pupils ==
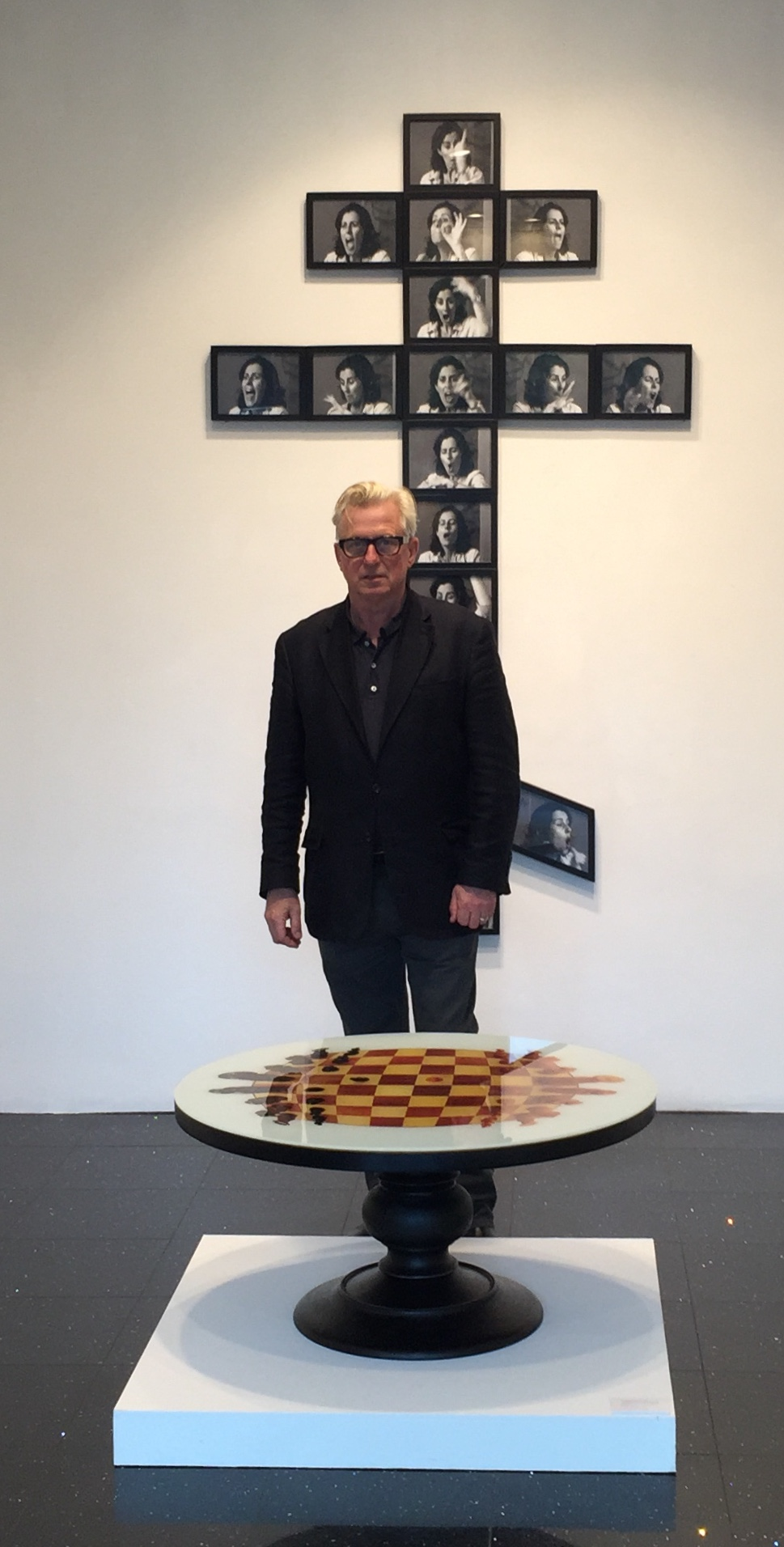
Vaughan Grylls

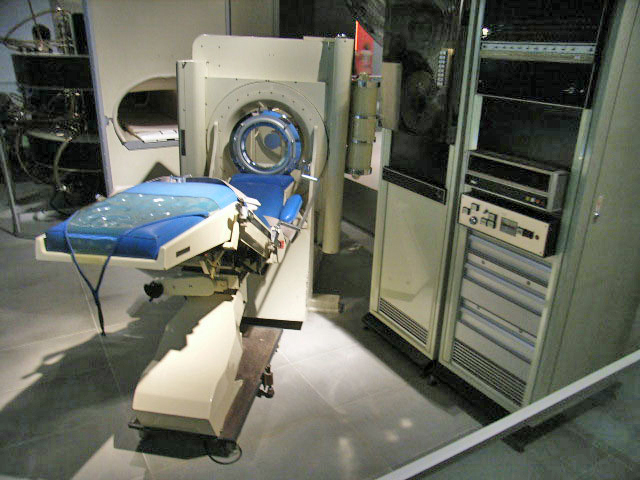
Historic EMI CT scanner, developed by Sir Godfrey Hounsfield

=== Magnus Grammar School ===
- Sir Michael Bond (physician), Professor from 1973 to 1998 of Psychological Medicine at the University of Glasgow
- Major Gonville Bromhead VC, won the VC at the Battle of Rorke's Drift in 1879
- William Caparne, painter of flowers and a horticulturist
- Nigel Doughty, investor and football club owner
- John Dudderidge, canoer who founded the British Canoe Union
- Professor Vaughan Grylls, artist, photographer, and author; director of the Kent Institute of Art & Design and co-founder of the University for the Creative Arts
- Sir Mark Grundy, headteacher
- Dusty Hare MBE, rugby player
- Samuel Reynolds Hole Dean of Rochester, noted horticulturalist
- Sir Godfrey Hounsfield CBE, electrical engineer, responsible for the CT scanner (or CAT scan) at the EMI Central Laboratories at Hayes, and joint-recipient of the 1979 Nobel Prize in Physiology or Medicine with Allan McLeod Cormack, gave his name to the Hounsfield scale, and also led the team that built the EMIDEC 1100, Britain's first transistor computer, in 1959
- Thomas Jacomb, seventeenth-century ejected minister
- Sir Gordon Jewkes CMG, Commissioner for the British Antarctic Territory from 1985 to 1988
- Thomas Kerr CB, director from 1980 to 1984 of the Royal Aircraft Establishment (RAE), and president from 1985 to 1986 of the Royal Aeronautical Society (RAeS), Director from 1974 to 1980 of the National Gas Turbine Establishment, and involved in the development of the Fairey Delta 2 in 1956
- Sir William Nicholson, artist
- William Newzam Nicholson, engineer, father of the above, and Conservative MP from 1880 to 1885 for Newark
- Patrick Oakden, cricketer for Nottinghamshire
- Norman Pace, comedian
- Air Chief Marshal Sir Andrew Pulford KCB CBE ADC RAF, Chief of the Air Staff from 2013 to 2016, and AOC from 2007 to 2008 of No. 2 Group RAF
- Arthur Richardson (politician), Liberal MP from 1917 to 1918 for Rotherham, and from 1906 to 1910 for Nottingham South
- John Wells, rugby player
- Sir Donald Wolfit CBE, actor

== Former teachers ==
- William Cubley, artist who taught William Nicholson and William Caparne
- Edward Noakes, Archdeacon of Derby from 1909 to 1943
- John Burdett Wittenoom, headmaster 1813–1828, first Colonial Chaplain of Western Australia 1829–1855

== Publication ==
- Noel George Jackson, Newark Magnus: the Story of a Gift, Nottingham: J. & H. Bell, 1964
