= Relief of Newark =

1644 battle in the First English Civil War

- Part of the First English Civil War
Date	21 March 1644
Location	Newark-on-Trent, Nottinghamshire
Result	Royalist victory

Belligerents
Parliamentarians	Royalists

Commanders and leaders
Sir John Meldrum; Colonel Edward Rossiter	Prince Rupert

Strength
2,000 horse 5,000 foot 13 siege guns	3,500 horse 3,000 foot 3 field guns

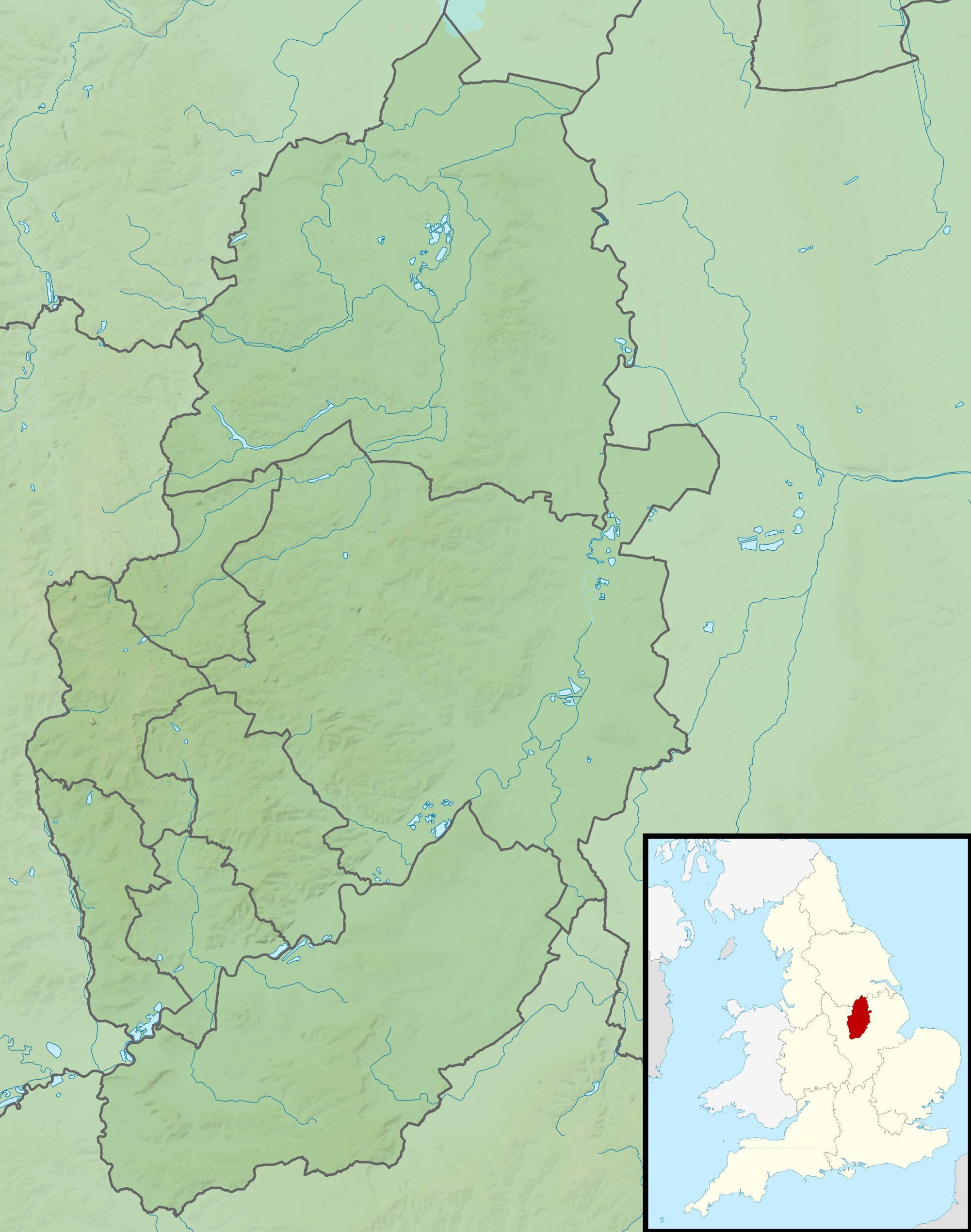
Nottinghamshire and Newark

The Relief of Newark (21 March 1644) was a Royalist victory during the First English Civil War. It was a personal victory for Prince Rupert and it resulted in the Royalists holding Newark-on-Trent until almost the end of the war.

== Background ==
At the start of 1644, King Charles aimed to build an army in the northwest of England, built around regiments which he had brought back from Ireland after a treaty (or "cessation") was signed with the Catholic Confederates. John Byron, 1st Baron Byron who commanded this army, was heavily defeated at the Battle of Nantwich on 26 January, resulting in considerable casualties to the first regiments of foot landed from Ireland. Charles therefore ordered his nephew, Prince Rupert, to take command of the army and Rupert set up his headquarters in Shrewsbury on 21 February.

Meanwhile, the Parliamentarian forces in the Midlands advanced to besiege the Royalist stronghold of Newark-on-Trent (known as The Second Siege of Newark, following the brief 1643 siege). Newark was a vital garrison that dominated the River Trent and also posed a threat to Parliamentary forces in the East of England. The town was highly defensible, as The Trent forms a natural moat around much of the town, it had been further fortified with earthworks and batteries by Richard Byron (brother of Lord John Byron), and it had a well-built, stone castle overlooking the Trent.

The Parliamentarians were led by an experienced professional soldier, Sir John Meldrum. On 6 March, his forces crossed the eastern branch of the River Trent, but were repelled when they tried to attack the town on 8 March. Following this failed attack, the Parliamentarians began constructing siege works and entrenchments.

On 12 March, the king ordered Rupert to relieve Newark. Hastily returning to Shrewsbury from Chester, where he had been conferring with Lord John Byron, Rupert collected a force based around his own regiment of horse, and musketeers detached mainly from two regiments from Ireland (Tillier's and Broughton's) which had recently landed in North Wales and which had therefore not been involved in the defeat at Nantwich. He marched towards Newark via the Royalist-held towns of Wolverhampton, Ashby-de-la-Zouch and Bingham, augmenting his force with troops drawn from their garrisons.

== Battle ==
Although Meldrum had been warned of Rupert's approach, Rupert arrived too quickly for him to withdraw. Instead, Meldrum drew up his forces around the "Spittal" (the ruins of St Leonard's Hospice, which had been destroyed by fighting the previous year) on the east side of the Trent. Fearing that Meldrum might still withdraw, Rupert's cavalry advanced by moonlight and attacked in the early morning of 21 March.

Rupert left a small troop under Colonel Charles Gerard in reserve, and led his own lifeguard of horse on the left wing in person, with Colonel Sir Richard Crane leading Rupert's regiment of horse on the right wing. The Parliamentarian cavalry were led by Colonel Edward Rossiter on the left wing (who led troops raised from Nottinghamshire) and Colonel Francis Thornhalgh on the right (with troops raised from Lincolnshire). A third body of Parliamentarian horse from Derby was absent, as they were covering the siege works, which meant the numbers of opposing cavalry were roughly equal.

When Rupert attacked, the Parliamentarian right wing fled. Rupert himself was engaged in hand-to-hand fighting, but the Parliamentarian left wing drove the Royalists back. Gerard was unhorsed and captured leading a counterattack. Eventually, Rossiter was outflanked and forced to withdraw, in good order, with the Parliamentarians withdrawing across a bridge of boats onto a small island which lay between two branches of the Trent. Rupert's infantry, under the command of Colonel Henry Tillier, attempted to capture the bridge of boats but were repelled.

Meldrum's army were now effectively marooned in the middle of the Trent, with only a few days' rations. His officers quarrelled and a regiment from Norfolk mutinied. Meldrum asked for terms of surrender. His army was permitted to withdraw to nearby Parliamentarian garrisons, leaving behind their weapons and ammunition.

== Aftermath ==
The Relief of Newark was perhaps Rupert's greatest personal triumph in the Civil War. His rapid march and determined offensive compelled a superior Parliamentarian force to capitulate, with the Royalists securing 3,000 muskets, 11 guns and two mortars as a result.

However, he was unable to keep his army together, as the detachments he had gathered on his march had to be returned to their garrisons. Nor did he have time to exploit his victory, as the Royalists were in difficulty elsewhere, both in the north and south of England.

The artillery left behind by the Parliamentarians when they withdrew was incorporated into the town’s defences. The Spittal was replaced by a three-acre square earthwork called the King’s Sconce, which had arrow-headed bastions at each corner and was ringed by a ditch said to be up to 30 feet wide and 15 feet deep. An identical defensive structure called the Queen’s Sconce was constructed to defend the southern approach to Newark and can still be seen today.

The third, and much longer, siege of Newark began on 26 November 1645, when Scottish and Parliamentarian troops launched a twin attack on Newark. Despite many hardships, the town held out until it was ordered by Charles to surrender on 8 May 1646.

== Cultural references ==
The Siege and Relief of Newark is commemorated in a fantasia, "Newark Siege" by John Jenkins, who was the Court Composer to Charles I and Charles II. The piece is a notable example of programme music and consists of a pavane and a galliard.
