= Newark Advertiser =

Newark-on-Trent

- Type: Weekly newspaper
- Format: Tabloid
- Owner(s): Iliffe Media
- Founded: 1854
- Language: English
- Headquarters: Fernwood Business Park, Newark, Nottinghamshire
- Circulation: 4,660 (as of 2022)
- Website: newarkadvertiser.co.uk

The Newark Advertiser is a British regional newspaper, owned by Iliffe Media, for the town of Newark-on-Trent and surrounding areas.

== History ==
The Advertiser had its beginnings in 1847, when printer William Tomlinson of Stodman Street issued the first Newark Monthly Advertiser. It had four pages and cost 1d. In 1854 Tomlinson made his journal a weekly publication, called it the Newark Advertiser and Farmers' Journal, doubled its size to eight pages and trebled the price to 3d. Upon Tomlinson's death his son-in-law Mr Whiles became the sole owner of the Advertiser.

In 1874 Cornelius Brown became editor of the Newark Advertiser. Within months of taking the editor's chair, Brown was ready to buy a half-share in the newspaper, for which he paid Mr Whiles £600. The Newark Advertiser Co Ltd was incorporated on 19 September 1882.

When Whiles died in 1900, he was succeeded by his son Herbert Whiles. In 1903 J. C. Kew came on to the Advertiser scene in a significant way. He had already been writing for the paper for some years and also ran a coal business at Beaumond Cross. At the age of 51, Brown decided to hand over some of his editorial responsibilities to Kew (who was then 35). Cornelius Brown died on 4 November 1907 and Kew became editor. Kew was succeeded by his nephew Cyril Parlby as editor in 1930.

Cyril Parlby was succeeded by his son Roger Parlby in 1967. The year after Mr Parlby was made editor, the Advertiser became the first newspaper in the country to invest in a web-offset printing press to ensure better photograph reproduction. The press made colour printing possible and the Advertiser carried full colour in 1968 before most national newspapers. Roger Parlby continued as editor until 1984 when he became editor-in-chief. He held this role until his death in 2014.

The Advertiser was sold to Iliffe Media in 2018.

== See also ==
- S. S. Chamberlain (1851–1916), who started his newspaper career as a journalist on the paper (1873–1874)
