= Patrick Oakden =

English cricketer

Personal information
- Full name: Robert Patrick Oakden
- Born: 9 May 1938; Kirkby-in-Ashfield, Nottinghamshire, England
- Died: 20 July 2011 (aged 73); Kirkby-in-Ashfield, Nottinghamshire, England
- Batting: Right-handed
- Bowling: Right-arm fast-medium
- Role: Bowler

Domestic team information
- Years: Team
- 1960–1961: Nottinghamshire

Career statistics
Competition	First-class
Matches	8
Runs scored	68
Batting average	9.71
100s/50s	0/0
Top score	24
Balls bowled	1,241
Wickets	17
Bowling average	42.82
5 wickets in innings	0
10 wickets in match	0
Best bowling	4/78
Catches/stumpings	4/–
- Source: ESPNcricinfo, 10 March 2017

Robert Patrick Oakden (9 May 1938 – 20 July 2011) was an English cricketer. Oakden was a right-handed batsman who bowled right-arm fast-medium. He was born at Kirkby-in-Ashfield, Nottinghamshire, and was educated at Newark Magnus Grammar School.

Oakden made his first-class debut for Nottinghamshire against Lancashire in the 1960 County Championship. He made seven further first-class appearances for the county, the last of which came against Hampshire in the 1961 County Championship. In his eight first-class appearances for the county, he took 17 wickets at an average of 42.82, with best figures of 4/78. With the bat, he scored 68 runs at a batting average of 9.71, with a high score of 24.

Outside of cricket, Oakden completed his National Service in the Royal Navy, during which he had served aboard HMS Bulwark. Following his first-class cricket career, Oakden played golf to a high standard, becoming the first person to represent Nottinghamshire at both cricket and golf since World War II. He died at the town of his birth on 20 July 2011.
