= Newark Town Hall =

Municipal building in Newark, Nottinghamshire, England

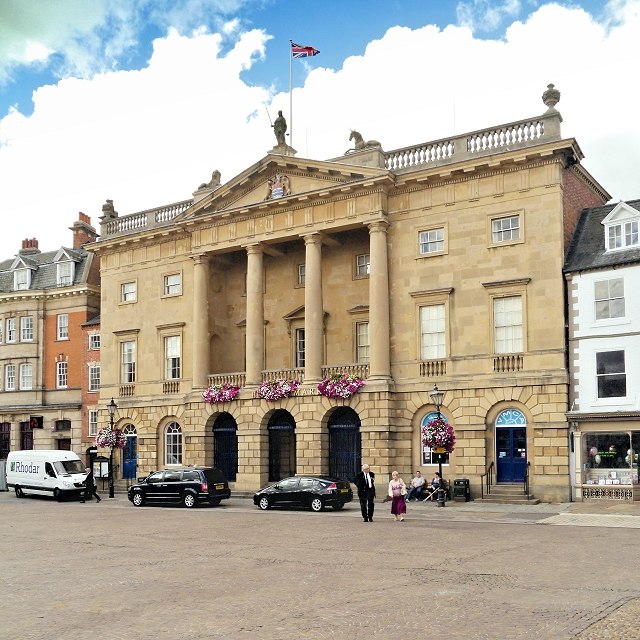
- Newark Town Hall

- Shown in Nottinghamshire
- 53°04′35″N 00°48′36″W
- Location: Market Place, Newark-on-Trent

History
- Built: 1776

Site notes
- Architect: John Carr
- Architectural style: Neoclassical style

Listed Building – Grade I
- Official name: Town Hall
- Designated: 29 September 1950
- Reference no.: 1196430

Newark Town Hall is a municipal building consisting of a town hall, assembly rooms and a market hall in Newark-on-Trent, Nottinghamshire, England. It is a Grade I listed building.

== History ==
The previous civic building in the town was the Moot Hall on the north side of the Market Place. In the early 1770s, Newark Corporation decided to commission a more substantial municipal structure on the west side of the Market Place. The foundation stone for the new building was laid by the mayor, William Haslam, in 1773. The new building was designed by John Carr in the neoclassical style, built in ashlar stone and was completed in 1776. Much of the exterior building work must have been finished by 1775 as in early 1775 the commissioners for building the town hall were offering contracts for the interior joinery and plasterwork.

The design involved a symmetrical main frontage with seven bays facing onto the Market Place; the central section of three bays, which slightly projected forward, featured a giant tetrastyle portico with Doric order columns supporting a pediment with the borough coat of arms in the tympanum and a statue of justice at its apex. There was a statue of a lion on the left of the pediment at a statue of a unicorn on the right.

In the late 18th century an addition was made to form the mayor's secretary's office. The building has served as the office of the mayor and the local council since it was erected. The civic rooms include a council chamber and the mayor's parlour. The main assembly room, which has also been used as a ballroom and concert hall, was designed to also serve as the borough law court. The ceiling in the assembly room was installed by Moses Kilminster of Derby. The assembly room was also used as the venue for public meetings: Caroline Ashurst Biggs and Jessie Craigen were among the speakers who addressed a meeting on women's suffrage in the room in November 1880. It was also the venue for the presentation of a silver casket to Henry Pelham-Clinton, 7th Duke of Newcastle in 1914.

The building continued to serve as the headquarters of the local borough council for much of the 20th century but ceased to be the local seat of government when the enlarged Newark and Sherwood District Council was formed at Kelham Hall in 1974. The town hall was restored between 1989 and 1991 by Guy St John Taylor Associates and James Brotherhood Associates. In 1993 the restoration work received a Europa Nostra Diploma of Merit. The building was opened up for public access as an art gallery and museum in 1999. In 2017 the exterior of the building was restored by historic building consultants Powell Williams at a cost of £600,000.

== See also ==
- Grade I listed buildings in Nottinghamshire
- Listed buildings in Newark-on-Trent
