= Christ Church, Newark =

Coordinates: 53°04′03″N 00°48′35″W

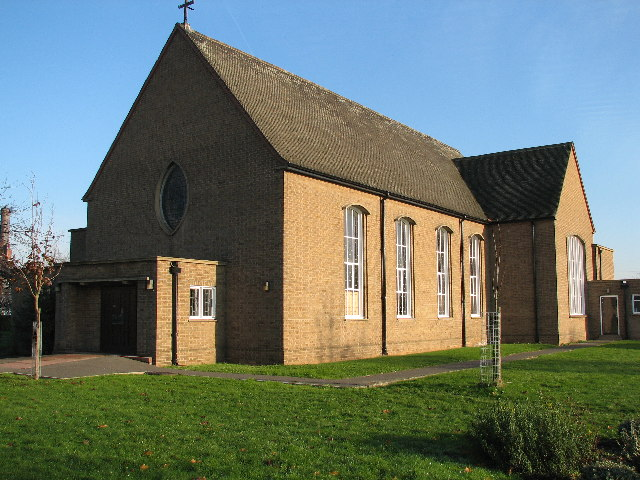
- Christ Church, Newark
- Denomination: Church of England
- Churchmanship: Evangelical
- Website: http://www.Christchurchnewark.co.uk

History
- Dedication: Christ

Administration
- Province: York
- Diocese: Southwell and Nottingham
- Parish: Newark-on-Trent

Clergy
- Vicar: Rev. Paul Franklin

Christ Church, Newark is a parish church in the Church of England in Newark-on-Trent, Nottinghamshire.

== History ==
The church was built in 1836 to 1837 by the architect J. D. Paine. It was evangelical in foundation, and the patronage was under the Church Pastoral Aid Society.

As Newark expanded, a new church was built to replace it in 1956 at the junction of Boundary Road and Holden Crescent. It was consecrated by the Bishop of Southwell in 1958.

== Organ ==
The church has a two-manual organ by Cousins of Lincoln. A specification of the organ can be found on the National Pipe Organ Register.

=== List of organists ===
- James Harston 1890 - ca. 1912 (formerly organist of St. Wilfrid's Church, South Muskham).
