= Sconce and Devon Park =

Park and listed ancient monument in Newark, Nottinghamshire

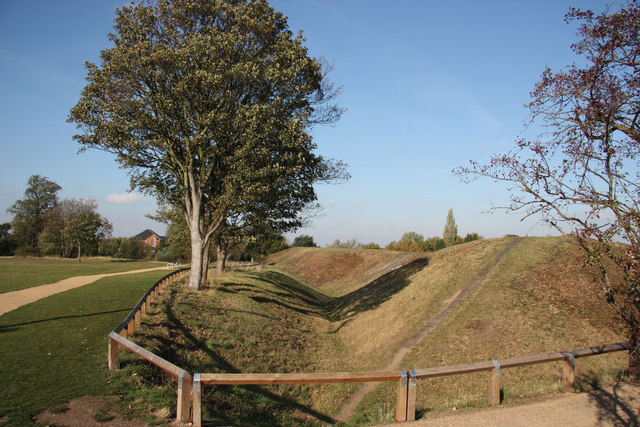
Queen's Sconce, Newark on Trent

Sconce and Devon Park is a park in Newark, Nottinghamshire, England. It is the location of Queen's sconce, an earthwork fortification that was built in 1646 during the First English Civil War, to protect the garrison of King Charles I based at Newark Castle. It is a listed ancient monument. The park has a visitor centre, local nature reserve and it is part of a civil war trail through the town.

== Facilities ==
There are large areas of open grass and woodlands which includes Devon Pastures Local Nature Reserve, a children's play area, a civil war trail, a cafe, a football centre with 2 adult and 4 mini-soccer pitches, a park ranger service, a fitness trail, a wildlife pond, a parkrun takes place every Saturday morning at 9 am, and there is a junior parkrun every Sunday at 9 am. The River Devon passes the park and contains Perch, bream, pike, chubb and carp. There are woodland walks with English Oak, willow and English Elm. There are two meadows which support grass species and marsh vegetation that are part of the Local Nature Reserve. An orchard has damson, blackthorn, plum and apple trees.

== Queen's Sconce ==
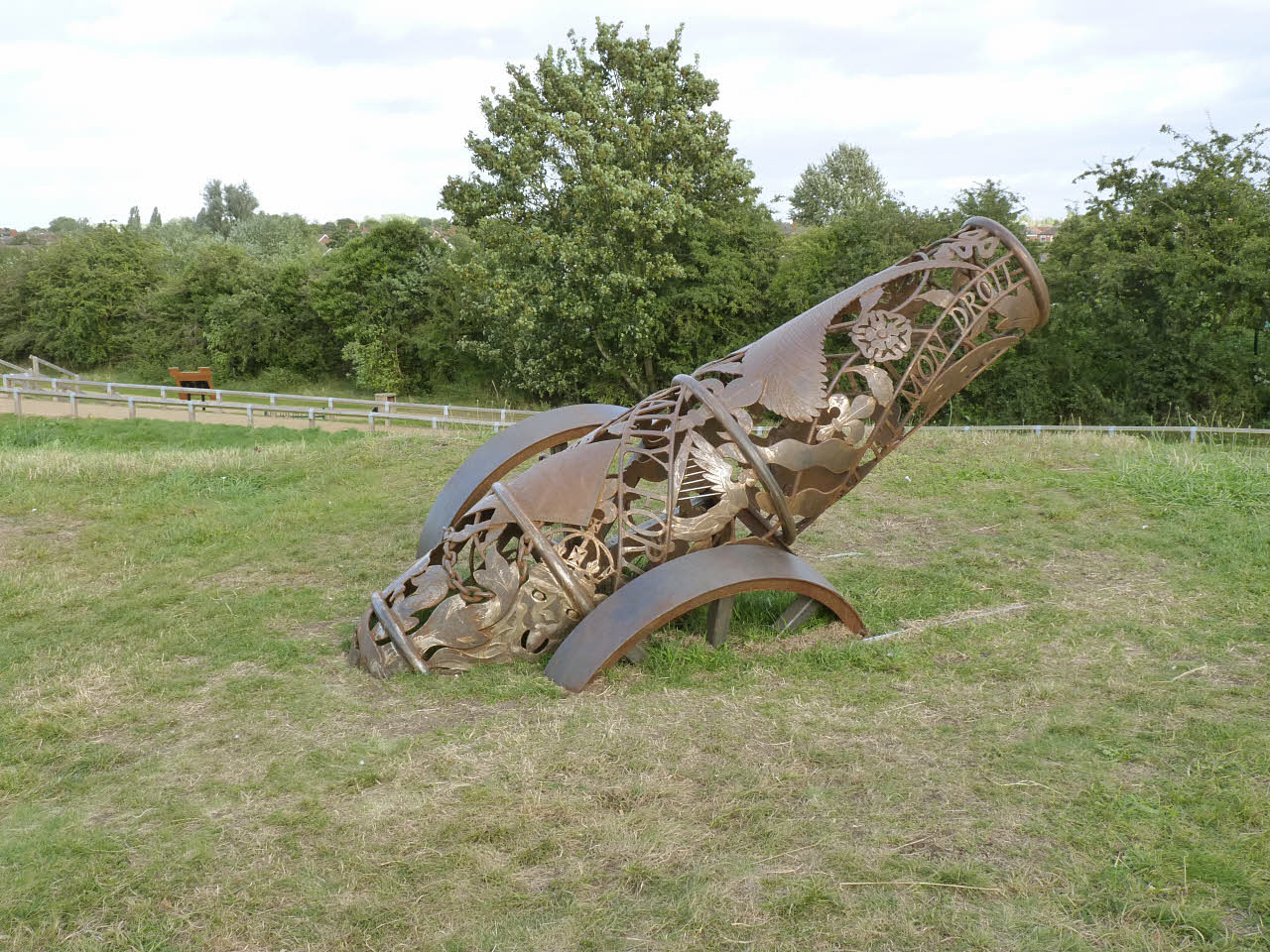
Cannon sculpture at Queen's Sconce, Newark on Trent

Held by the Royalists, Newark-on-Trent played a major role in the First English Civil War. Located on the last crossing point of the River Trent and at the intersection of the Great North Road and Fosse Way, it was strategically important. The stronghold was centred on Newark Castle and was besieged three times before it succumbed, at the King's instruction, in May 1646. The sieges resulted in extensive siegeworks built by both sides.

=== Construction ===
The second siege of Newark had highlighted the weaknesses of the garrison's defences and two new earthwork forts were constructed. The Queen's Sconce was one of these with the other being the King's Sconce. The Queen's Sconce was built upon a knoll positioned to cover approaches to the town from the south. It was named after the wife of Charles I, Henrietta Maria of France. The Sconce is one of the few forts that still survive and was only left untouched because the victorious Parliamentary army fled because of fears of the plague. The sconce measures 120m by 133m with a height of up to 9m, angle bastions project from the south, south west, north and north east. The corners of the ramparts are interpreted as platforms for firing artillery. The ramparts and bastions are enclosed by a ditch up to 21m wide and 3.6m to 4.5m deep. A counterscarp bank about 0.7m in height running along the south eastern and north eastern edge of the ditch shows the location of a palisade which contemporary accounts suggest originally enveloped the sconce. It was built using gravel from the River Devon and it is star-shaped when viewed from above.
