= Moot Hall, Newark-on-Trent =

Municipal building in Newark-on-Trent, England

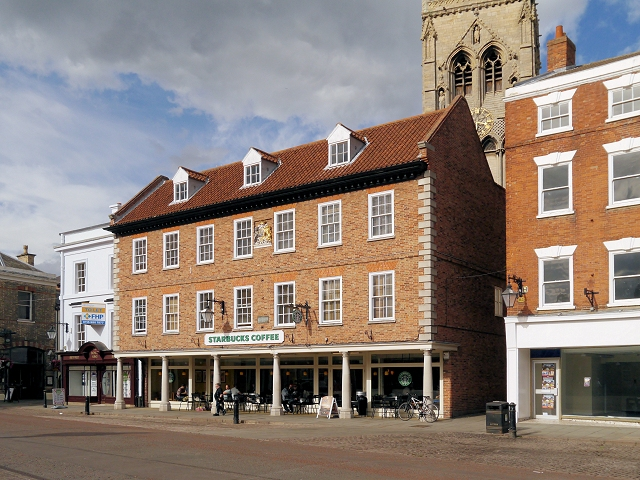
- Moot Hall, Newark-on-Trent

- Shown in Nottinghamshire
- 53.0765°N 0.8088°W
- Location: Market Place, Newark-on-Trent

History
- Built: 1708

Site notes
- Architectural style: Neoclassical style

The Moot Hall is a municipal building in the Market Place in Newark-on-Trent, Nottinghamshire, England. The building, which was the main municipal building in the town in the 18th century, currently accommodates a Starbucks coffee shop.

== History ==
The first municipal building in the town was a medieval building on the north side of the Market Place known as the "King's Hall", so named because of a transaction in 1547 when the Bishop of Lincoln exchanged ownership of the town with the Crown.

In the early 18th century, civic leaders decided to erect a new building on the same site. It was designed in the neoclassical style, built in red brick and was completed in 1708. The design involved a symmetrical main frontage of seven bays facing onto the Market Place. There was a colonnade on the ground floor formed by six Doric order columns which supported the upper floors: this allowed markets to be held on the ground floor. The building was fenestrated by sash windows on the first and second floors and there were three dormer windows at attic level. The coat of arms of the then lord of the manor, John Holles, Duke of Newcastle, whose seat was at Clumber Park, was affixed to the building at second floor level.

The building continued to serve as the meeting place for the borough officials and the venue for hearings of the manorial court as well as the quarter sessions until Newark Town Hall was completed in 1776. In the late 18th century, the building, which was still known as the "King's Hall", was described as "an extensive brick-built dwelling-house and large shop, heretofore occupied by Messrs. Fisher and Fillingham." It was bought by Henry Pelham-Clinton, 4th Duke of Newcastle in 1836 and subsequently continued to be used as shops. In 1924, it was acquired by a radio and music shop, A. F. Coyne, and in 1963, after Coynes went into liquidation, it was bought by the electrical retailer, Currys. By that time the building was at risk of collapse, and under the management of Currys, it was completely dismantled and rebuilt around a modern steel frame, to a design by Robert Ingram, in the mid-1960s.

In the early 21st century, the building changed hands again, becoming a branch of the coffee shop, Starbucks.
