= William Caparne =

British horticulturist and painter (1855–1940)

William John Caparne
- Caparne in later life
- Born: William John Caparn; 17 November 1855; Newark-on-Trent, United Kingdom
- Died: 31 January 1940 (aged 84); Saint Martin, Guernsey
- Spouse: Louisa Jane Atkins (c.1860–1894)

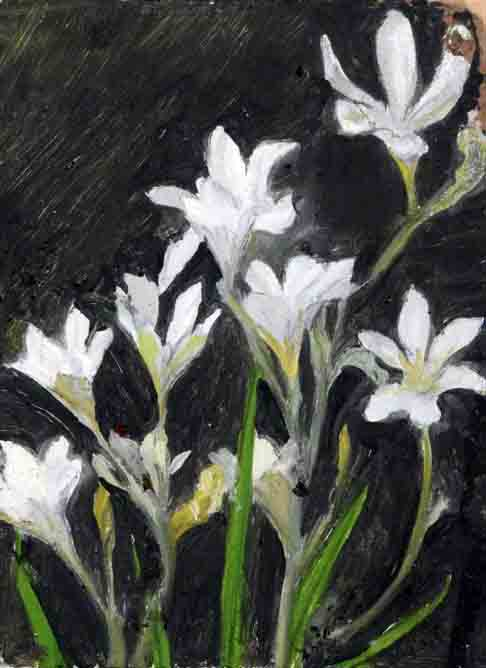
Flowers, now in the Guernsey Museum & Art Gallery

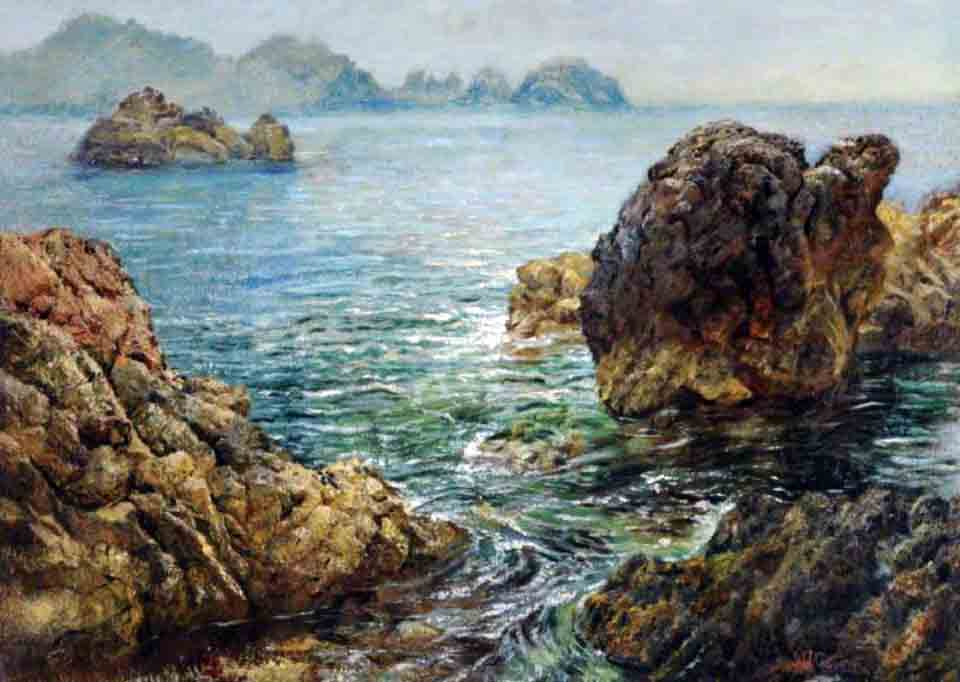
Cradle Rock and Pea Stacks

William Caparne (1855–1940), born William John Caparn, was a British horticulturist and a painter of floral and other subjects. He created the first hybrids in the intermediate bearded iris group, and is thought to have created more than a hundred cultivars of bulbous iris.

== Life ==
Caparne was born on 17 November 1855 in Newark-on-Trent, in Nottinghamshire. He was the eldest child of William Horner Caparn, an organist and teacher of music, and his wife Sophia Warwick. His grandfather and two of his uncles were seed merchants and his father grew irises. Caparne attended Magnus Grammar School where he had art lessons from the painter, politician and art-master William Cubley of Newark-on-Trent, who had been a pupil of Sir William Beechey, a former pupil of Sir Joshua Reynolds. Caparne taught in an art school from the age of 16, and in 1877 was taken on as drawing-master at Oundle School. In 1879 he married Louisa Jane Atkins. A daughter, Louisa Winifred, was born in 1880, and in the same year he was appointed art master at Oundle.

In 1895 Caparne moved to Guernsey following the death of his wife, where he was to paint for the next 40 years, living in a small cottage on a cliff top in the parish of St Martin between Bon Port and Saints Bay, using an old tram as his workshop. It was during this time that he added an "e" to the end of his surname. Losing his sight three years before his death.

== Work ==
Painting in various media, his subjects were associated with his local environment, the sea, sky and land. Flowers, individual and in groups were common in his works, he was an acknowledged expert in Iris.

In 1936 he was the recipient of the annual Foster Memorial Plaque of the Iris Society, of which he was also made an honorary member.
