= William Cubley =

English painter

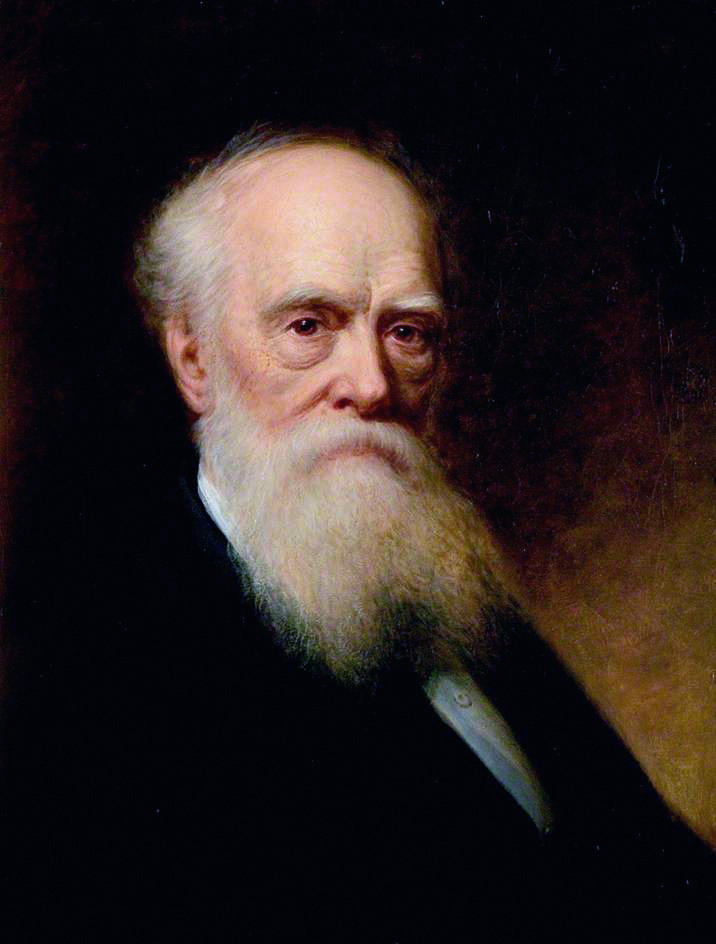
- Self portrait
- Born: William Harold Cubley; 9 October 1816; Heanor, Derbyshire
- Died: 10 August 1896 (aged 79); Bryndu, Llanberis
- Known for: portraits, landscapes
- Spouses: Jane Spencer; Amy Jane Brown

William Harold Cubley (9 October 1816 – 1896) was an English painter of landscapes and portraits in the tradition of Sir Joshua Reynolds. He studied with Sir William Beechey, and was an important early influence on Sir William Nicholson and William Caparne.

== Life ==
Cubley was born on 9 October 1816 in Heanor, Derbyshire. His father was a needlemaker. The family moved to Nottingham in 1819, where Cubley saw the Reform Riots of 1831 and the burning of Nottingham Castle, and in 1834 moved again, to Newark-on-Trent. Cubley married Jane Spencer in 1838. He took lessons in London with Richard Rothwell, member of the Royal Hibernian Academy and former studio assistant to Sir Thomas Lawrence. Cubley also studied with Sir William Beechey, who had been a pupil of Reynolds. Cubley taught art in Grantham and Lincoln, and at Magnus Grammar School in Newark, where he was known as "Old Cubley" and where William Nicholson and William Caparne were his pupils. His influence on Nicholson was considerable: he gave him weekly drawing lessons, took him on painting trips in the country, and may have persuaded Nicholson's father to allow the boy to take up full-time study of art. Nicholson later painted a portrait of Cubley, which he described as "a very bad portrait of a very good man"; it is now in the Long Gallery of Nottingham Castle.

Jane Cubley died in 1873, and in 1886 Cubley married Amy Jane Brown. In his 80th year he fell ill while on a painting trip in Wales, and died shortly afterwards at Bryndu, Llanberis, on 10 August 1896. He was buried at Newark.

== Works ==
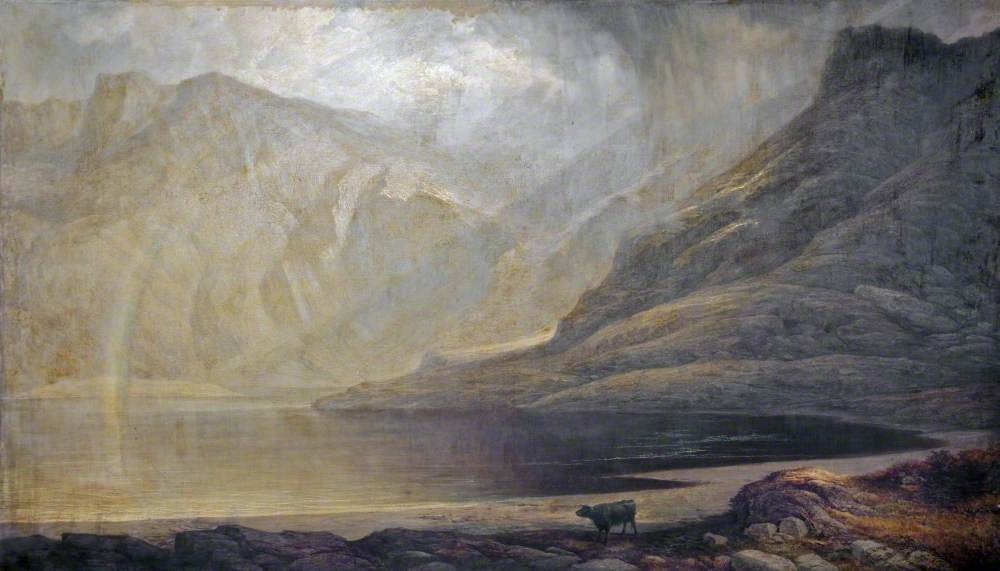
Llyn Idwal, by William Cubley, Walker Art Gallery, Liverpool

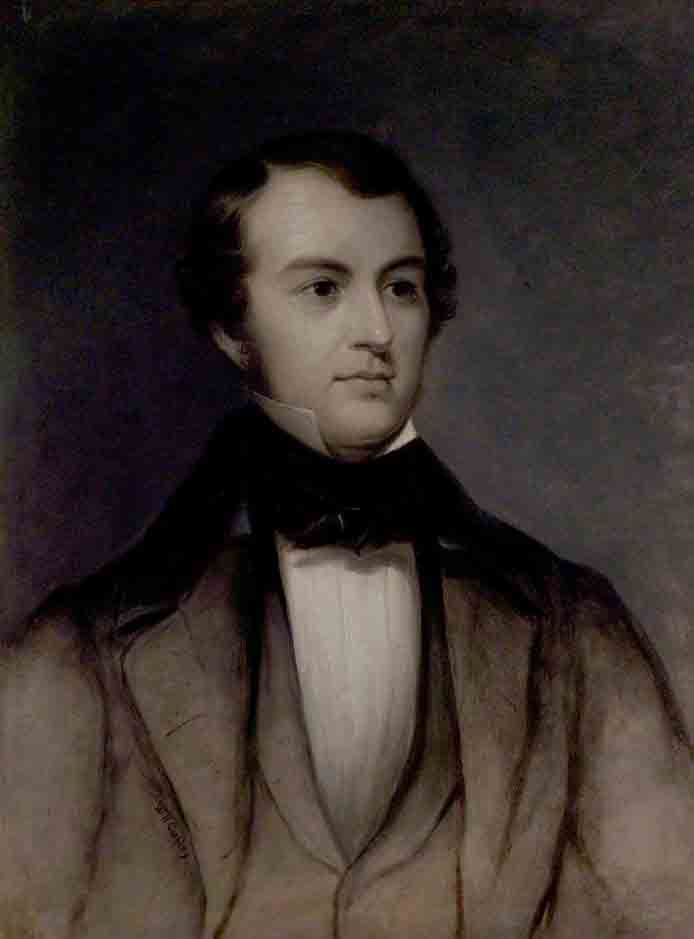
William Ewart Gladstone (1809–1898) by William Cubley, painted c. 1835 or later, now in Newark Millgate Museum; Gladstone was MP for Newark-on-Trent in 1832

Cubley travelled widely both in Britain and on the Continent painting landscapes, in oils and in watercolour. He also painted many portraits; in 1840 or 1841 he painted William Gladstone, who had become MP for Newark in 1832.

He exhibited both at the Royal Academy, where he showed Kate Kearney in 1863, Evening in the Lledr Valley, North Wales in 1868, Llyn Idwal in 1872 and A midsummer night – Abermaw Harbour, near Barmouth, North Wales in 1873, and also at the Suffolk Street gallery of the Society of British Artists. His landscape Llyn Idwal was shown again at the Third Annual International Exhibition in London in 1873, where it won a gold medal and was bought by the Walker Art Gallery of Liverpool.
