= Cornelius Brown =

- Born: 5 March 1852; Lowdham, Nottinghamshire, England
- Died: 4 November 1907 (aged 55); Newark
- Occupations: Reporter, Historian

Cornelius Brown (5 March 1852 in Lowdham, Nottinghamshire – 4 November 1907) was an English journalist and historian. In 1874, 22-year-old Brown became editor of the Newark Advertiser in nearby Newark-on-Trent. Over the next 33 years, he wrote seven major books, including a two-volume History of Newark, which took him 15 years. He became a fellow of the Society of Antiquaries and of the Royal Society of Literature.

== Journalistic career ==
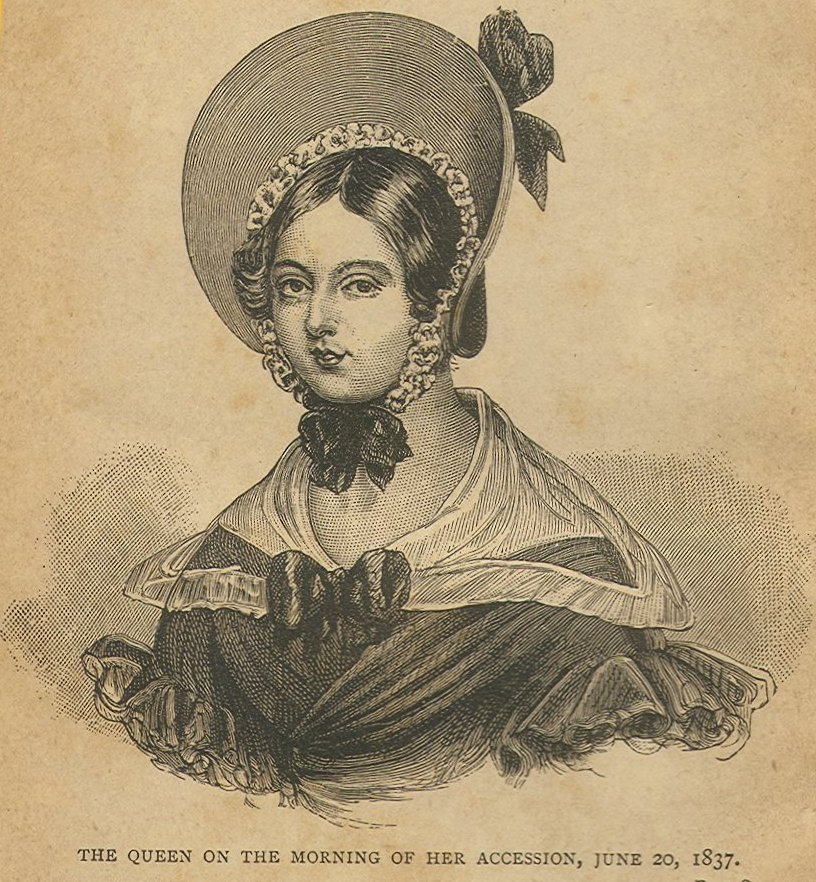
Engraving from 1886 book "True Stories of the Reign of Queen Victoria" by Cornelius Brown

=== Newark Advertiser ===
Within months of taking the editor's chair at the Newark Advertiser, Brown was ready to buy a half share in the newspaper, for which he paid Whiles £600. The two partners agreed that until a working fund of £300 had been created out of the profits neither would draw more than £8 a month from the profits for his own use. Whiles was to manage the business side while Brown was in charge of editorial matters.

The Advertiser was being printed in Nottingham for want of adequate facilities in Newark, but Brown found this a disadvantage and in 1880 the firm took premises at the corner of Appletongate and Magnus Street to house a Wharfedale printing press. The Newark Advertiser Co Ltd was incorporated on 19 September 1882.

Cornelius Brown already had one book to his credit The Annals of Newark and in 1882 came The Worthies of Notts. Then Mr Brown laid his author's pen aside for three or four years to concentrate on the second important step in the Advertiser story.

Six weeks later half a dozen men met at the Middlegate offices of solicitors Newton and Wallis (now Tallents Godfrey). They were the subscribers to the Memorandum of Association of the Newark Advertiser Co. Ltd. namely Brown, Major George Mark, Leycester Egerton, Captain William Henry Coape, Oates MP, William Newzam Nicholson, John Burton Barrow, and William Newton. They were all allocated shares, as were four more men who had made applications: Joseph Gilstrap Branston, William Evelyn, Denison, Viscount Newark (later MP for Newark) and Colonel James Thorpe.

Barrow's interest in the firm was short-lived: he sold his four shares two-and-a-half years later. Branston did the same in the following year, but at that meeting in 1882 Major Egerton was made chairman and Brown was appointed secretary, manager and editor at a salary of £200 a year. That salary remained unchanged for 21 years, at the end of which time Brown himself proposed that it should be cut to £156, because he was handing over the responsibility of night work to a younger man.

Under Brown's editorship the Advertiser continued to flourish. The board spent 50 shillings on a treat for the workforce to celebrate Queen Victoria's golden jubilee. Although it was decided to buy a new printing press, Brown later reported that he could alter the present one to make it do. He still travelled in daily from Southwell until in 1889 a house was built for him next to the works, by Brown and Son at a cost of £490.

=== Technology ===
The Advertiser began to move into a technological age, buying a 2 hp gas engine to supplement the steam power, and in 1895 installing the telephone. Two years later came the first Linotype machine on hire. Within months came electric light, installed at a cost of £100.

Whiles, the original owner of the Advertiser, had maintained his connection with it as cashier and publisher, for the paper was still published from Stodman Street. When he died in 1900 he was succeeded by his son Herbert Whiles.

In 1903, J. C. Kew came onto the Advertiser scene in a significant way. He had already been writing for the paper for some years, while running a coal business at Beaumond Cross. He was later to be chairman of Newark Rural District Council for 21 years and during that time served two years as Mayor of Newark.

== Handing over ==
At the age of 51, Brown decided to hand over some of his editorial responsibilities to Kew, who was then 35. It was a prophetic decision, for just four years later Cornelius Brown died and Kew became editor. Brown had attended the October board meeting in 1907 but was taken ill ten days later after correcting the final proofs of his History of Newark. He died on 4 November without seeing the published version of Volume II.

== Private life ==
Cornelius Brown married and set up home at Almar House, Westgate, Southwell. It was there that his first child was born in 1881. She was named Ethel and later became Mrs R. P. Blatherwick.

== Bibliography ==
- Notes about Notts. (1874)
- The Annals of Newark (1879)
- An Appreciative Life of the Right Hon. the Earl of Beaconsfield (1881)
- The Worthies of Notts. (1882)
- True Stories of the Reign of Queen Victoria (1886)
- A History of Nottinghamshire (1891)
- A History of Newark in two volumes (1905 and 1907).
