= Slater (name) =

Slater is an English language given name and surname derived from the occupation of a slater, a tradesman who works with slate.

Notable individuals and fictional characters with the name include:

== Given name ==
- Slater Bradley (born 1975), an American conceptual and cross-disciplinary artist
- Slater Jewell-Kemker (born 1992), American-Canadian filmmaker and climate activist
- Slater Koekkoek (born 1994), Canadian ice hockey player
- Slater Martin (1925–2012), American basketball player and coach
- Slater Rhea (born 1987), American singer, songwriter and TV personality on national TV in China
- Slater B. Stubbs (died 1867), American politician from Maryland
- Slater Young (born 1983), Filipino television personality, actor, and entrepreneur

== Surname ==
=== A ===
- Allana Slater (born 1984), Australian artistic gymnast
- Anna Slater, British chemist
- Austin Slater (born 1992), American baseball player

=== B ===
- Ben Slater (born 1991), English cricketer
- Bert Slater (1936–2006), Scottish football player
- Bill Slater (disambiguation)
- Billy Slater (born 1983), Australian rugby league player
- Billy Slater (footballer) (1858–?), English footballer

=== C ===
- Chloe Slater (born 2003), English singer-songwriter
- Christian Slater (born 1969), American actor
- Courtenay Slater (1933–2017), Chief Economist for the US Department of Commerce

=== D ===
- Dan Slater (born 1976), New Zealand sailor
- Dave Slater (fl. 1971), Canadian rugby union player - see List of Canada national rugby union players
- David Slater (disambiguation)
- Dick Slater (1951–2018), American professional wrestler
- Don Slater (born 1954), British sociologist
- Douglas Slater, Saint Vincent and the Grenadines politician
- Duke Slater (1898–1966), American football player

=== E ===
- Edward Slater (1917–2016), aka Bill Slater, Australian biochemist
- Eliot Slater (1904–1983), British psychiatrist and eugenicist

=== F ===
- Florence Wells Slater (1864–1941), American entomologist and schoolteacher
- Frank O. Slater (1920–1942), United States Navy sailor possthumously awarded the Navy Cross
- Fred J. Slater (1885–1943), American politician
- Freddie Slater (racing driver) (born 2008), British racing driver

=== G ===
- George Slater (1864-?), English footballer
- George A. Slater (1867–1937), American politician and judge
- Glenn Slater (born 1968), American lyricist
- Gordon Slater (disambiguation)

=== H ===
- Harriet Slater (actress) (born 1994), English actress
- Harriet Slater (politician) (1903–1976), British politician
- Harrison Slater, American writer, pianist, and educator
- Harry Slater (disambiguation)
- Heath Slater (born 1983), wrestler
- Helen Slater (born 1963), American film actor and singer-songwriter
- Henry Slater (disambiguation)
- Herman Slater (1935–1992), American occultist, writer and shop-owner
- Howard R. Slater (1917–1987), American politician and lawyer

=== I ===
- Ida Slater (1881–1969), British geologist

=== J ===
- Jacob Slater, English musician with Wunderhorse
- Jacob Slater, Irish footballer
- Jack Slater (politician) (1927–1997), Australian politician
- Jackie Slater (born 1954), American football player
- James Slater (disambiguation)
- Jason Slater (1971–2020), American record producer
- J. D. Slater (born 1955), filmmaker and composer
- Jessie Slater (1879–1961), British nuclear physicist
- Jim Slater (disambiguation)
- Jock Slater (born 1938), British admiral
- John Slater (disambiguation)
- Joseph Slater (disambiguation)

=== K ===
- Keith Slater (1935–2025), Australian cricketer and Australian rules footballer
- Kelly Slater (born 1972), American professional surfer
- Kent Slater (born 1945), American politician and judge

=== L ===
- Lauren Slater (born 1963), American psychologist and writer
- Leon Slater, (born 2004), British professional wrestler
- Lorna Slater, Canadian-born Scottish politician
- Lucy Joan Slater, British mathematician
- Luke Slater (born 1968), British musician

=== M ===
- Mary Jo Slater (born 1946), American casting director and producer
- Matthew Slater (born 1985), American football player
- Michael Slater (born 1970), Australian cricketer
- Michael Atwell Slater (died 1842), Royal Navy Officer and hydrographic surveyor
- Michael Slater (general) (born 1958), retired Australian Army major general
- Montagu Slater (1902–1956), English writer

=== N ===
- Nicky Slater, (born 1958), British former ice figure skater
- Nigel Slater (born 1958), British food writer, journalist and broadcaster
- Noel Slater, British mathematician and astronomer

=== O ===
- Oscar Slater, German-born man wrongly convicted of murder in Scotland

=== P ===
- Peter Slater (ice hockey) (born 1948), Canadian ice hockey player
- Peter Slater (ornithologist) (1932–2020), Australian ornithologist, wildlife artist and photographer
- Peter Slater (sculptor) (1809–1860), Scottish sculptor and portrait artist
- Philip Slater, American actor, writer and sociologist

=== R ===
- Ralph Slater, British millwright
- Rashawn Slater (born 1999), American football player
- Rebeccah Slater, British neuroscientist and academic
- Reggie Slater (born 1970), American basketball player
- Richard Slater (1634–1699), English politician
- Rob Slater (1960–1995), American mountaineer
- Robbie Slater (born 1964), Australian soccer player
- Robert Slater (disambiguation)
- Rodney E. Slater (born 1955), United States Secretary of Transportation
- Rodney Slater (musician) (born 1941), with Bonzo Dog Doo-Dah Band

=== S ===
- Sam Slater (film producer) (fl. from 2017), American film producer, real estate developer and minority NHL and NBA team owner
- Samuel Slater (1768–1835), American industrialist
- Samuel S. Slater (1870–1916), American politician
- Sharon Slater, Irish historian and author
- Simon Slater, British actor
- Stephanie Slater, (born 1991) British swimmer
- Steven Slater, American flight attendant who misbehaved on a flight
- Stuart Slater (born 1969), British football coach and former player
- Stuart Slater (born 1945), musician and songwriter from Liverpool - see English singer Stephanie De Sykes

=== T ===
- Terry Slater (geographer), British academic
- Terry Slater (ice hockey) (1937–1991), Canadian ice hockey player and coach
- Thomas C. Slater (1945–2009) American politician
- Timothy C. Slater (born 1933), American businessman

=== W ===
- William Slater (disambiguation)
- Willie J. Slater, American football coach and player

=== Fictional characters ===
- Slater, a Central Intelligence Agency operative on the animated TV series Archer voiced by actor Christian Slater
- A.C. Slater, in the TV series Saved by the Bell
- Alison Slater, in the British soap opera EastEnders
- Amy Mitchell (EastEnders) (also Slater), in the soap opera EastEnders
- Bev Slater, in EastEnders
- Charlie Slater, in EastEnders
- Dan Slater, the main character in the 1967 film The Double Man
- Garth Slater, in the TV series Loving
- Harry Slater, in the British soap opera EastEnders
- Hayley Slater, in the soap opera EastEnders
- Jack Slater, the main character of the 1993 movie Last Action Hero
- Jean Slater, in the British soap opera EastEnders
- June Slater, in the TV series Loving
- Kat Slater, in the British soap opera EastEnders
- Kyle Slater, in the British soap opera EastEnders
- Little Mo Slater, in EastEnders
- Lynne Hobbs, in EastEnders
- Michelle Slater, in the TV series Community
- Nick Slater, in the British TV series The Bill
- Ron Slater, in the 1993 movie Dazed and Confused
- DCI Roy Slater, in the British TV series Only Fools and Horses
- Sean Slater, in the British soap opera EastEnders
- Stacey Slater, in the soap opera EastEnders
- Viv Slater, in EastEnders
- Zoe Slater, in EastEnders

== See also ==
- Slater (disambiguation)
- Slaten
