= Slater (disambiguation) =

A slater is a tradesperson who works with slate.

Slater may also refer to:

== Companies ==
- Slater Brothers, a British, and later American, motorcycle dealer and importer
- Slater & Gordon, an Australian law firm
- Slater Menswear, a men's clothing retailer in the United Kingdom
- Slater Walker, a British industrial conglomerate turned bank

== People and fictional characters ==
- Slater (name), a list of people and fictional characters with the given name and surname

== Places ==
=== United States ===
- Slater, Colorado, an unincorporated community
- Slater, Iowa, a city
- Slater, Kentucky, an unincorporated community
- Slater Township, Cass County, Minnesota, a township
- Slater, Missouri, a city
- Slater, Ohio, an unincorporated community
- Slater, Wyoming, a census-designated place
- Slater Park, a historic public park in Pawtucket, Rhode Island

=== Geographical features ===
- Slater (crater), an impact crater near the south pole of the Moon
- Slater Branch, a stream in Missouri, United States
- Slater Rocks, a cluster of rock outcrops near Marie Byrd Land, Antarctica

== Structures in the United States ==
- Slater Building (Worcester, Massachusetts), a historic building
- Slater Cigar Company buildings, historic buildings in Lancaster County, Pennsylvania
- Slater Family Ice Arena, a hockey arena in Bowling Green, Ohio
- Slater Library, a historic public library in Griswold, Connecticut
- Slater Memorial Museum, a historic building in Norwich, Connecticut
- Slater Mill, a historic mill complex in Pawtucket, Rhode Island

== Other uses ==
- The Slater Field Guide to Australian Birds, used by Australian birders, published in 1986
- "Slater", a song on the 2013 album Wolf by Tyler, the Creator
- Slater Cup, a trophy awarded in Premiership Rugby in England
- Slater and Devil fires, fires during the 2020 California wildfire season
- Slater Fund, a financial endowment for education of African Americans in the Southern United States
- USS Slater (DE-766), a Cannon-class destroyer escort of the United States Navy
- Woodlouse, a crustacean commonly found in old wood and known as a "slater" in some countries

== See also ==
- Couvreur, French for slater, a surname
- Slaten
- Slatter
- Slayyyter, American musician
