= Joseph Slater =

Joseph Slater may refer to:

- Joseph Slater Sr. (1750–1805), British painter, father of Joseph Slater Jr.
- Joseph Slater Jr. (1782–1837), British portrait painter
- Joseph Slater, Baron Slater (1904–1977), British Labour Party politician
- Joseph E. Slater (1922–2002), American economist, president and chief executive of the Aspen Institute
