= Mary Kingdon Heslop =

Geographer and geologist

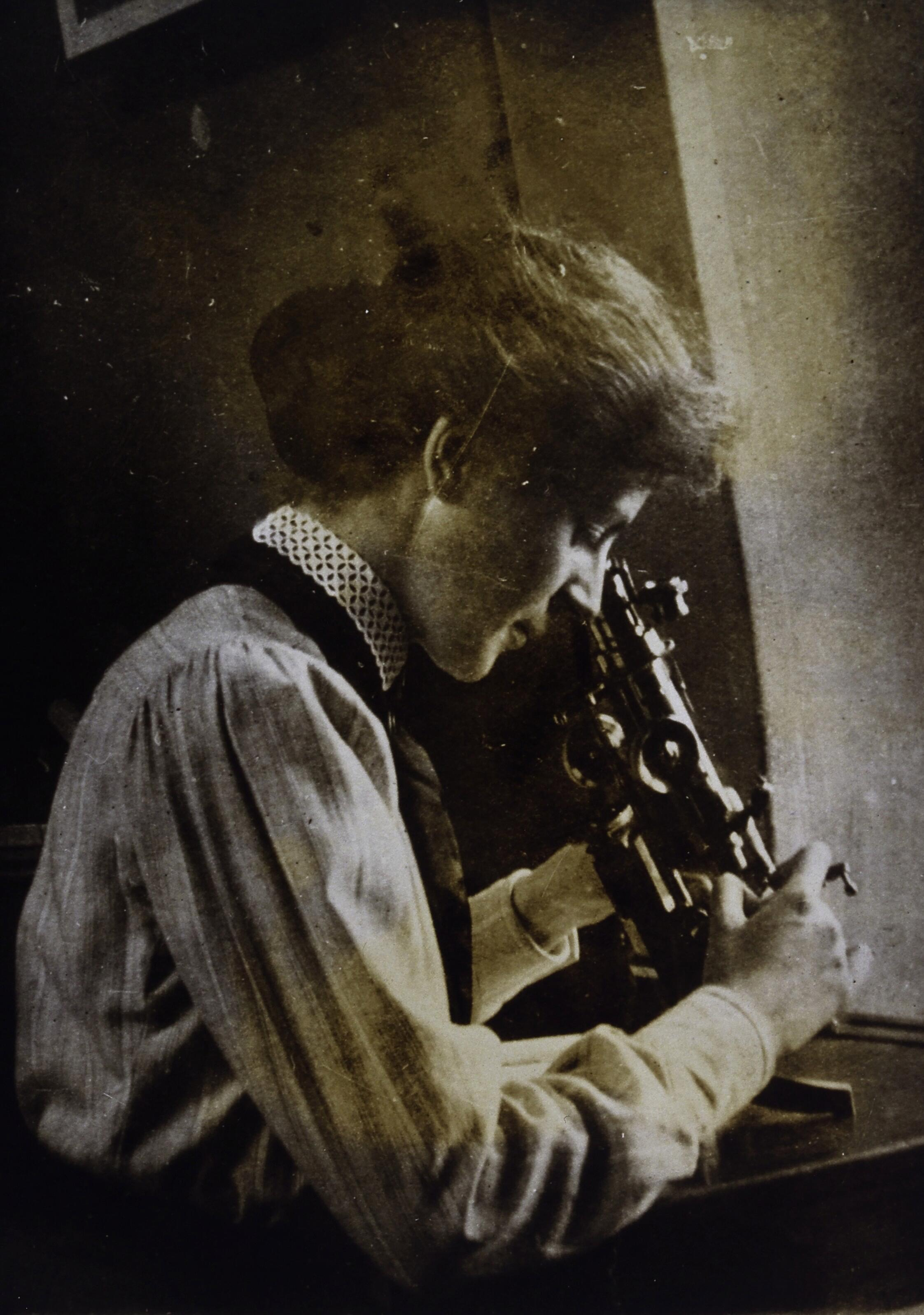
- Born: 1885; Egypt
- Died: 1955 (aged 69–70)
- Education: Armstrong College, Durham, University of Oxford
- Occupations: Geologist, geographer, teacher
- Known for: Being the first woman lecturer in geography at The University of Leeds, and one of the first women Fellows of the Geological Society of London.

Mary Kingdon Heslop (c.1885 – c.1955) was an Egyptian-born geologist and geographer. She pioneered of colour photomicrography, and taught for twenty-seven years at the Kenton Lodge Teacher Training College in Newcastle. Heslop was the first woman lecturer in geography at Leeds University, and one of the first women Fellows of the Geological Society of London.

== Life ==
Mary Kingdon Heslop was born circa 1884 or 1885 in Egypt, and brought up and educated there. Heslop moved to Newcastle and studied in physics and geology at Armstrong College, Durham, graduating in 1906. She remained there as a research fellow. In 1909, she gained a M.Sc for her work on igneous petrology, in which she pioneered the use of colour photomicrography and published several papers on the igneous dykes of Northern England. After becoming a demonstrator at Newcastle, she moved to Bedford College, London under Catherine Raisin.

Facing a lack of career opportunities in geology, Heslop took a one-year postgraduate diploma in geography at Oxford University in 1916. She taught at Church High School, Newcastle from 1916 until about 1921. On 3 December 1919 she was elected a Fellow of the Geological Society of London, one of the first women Fellows. From c.1920 to 1922 she was assistant lecturer in geography at Leeds University. From 1923 to 1950 she was a full-time lecturer at the Kenton Lodge Teacher Training College in Newcastle. She was described as "committed to her students and a skilled pianist and artist".

Heslop was an active member of the Geographical Association committees in Newcastle and Leeds. She died circa 1954 or 1955.

== Works ==
- 'On some elementary forms of crystallisation in the igneous dykes of Northumberland and Durham'. Proceedings of the University Of Durham Philosophical Society, Vol. 3 (1908), pp.37-46
- (with J. A. Smythe) 'The Dyke at Crookdene (Northumberland) and its Relations with the Collywell, Tynemouth and Morpeth Dykes'. Quarterly Journal of the Geological Society of London, Vol. 66, Part 1 (1910), pp.1-18
- 'A preliminary note on the uniaxial augites of the north of England igneous dykes'. Proceedings Of The University Of Durham Philosophical Society, Vol. 4 (1912), pp.172-174
- (with R. C. Burton) 'The tachylite of the Cleveland dyke'. Geological Magazine of London, dec. 5, Vol. 9 (1912), pp. 60-69
- 'The Trade of the Tyne', The Geographical Teacher, Vol. 10, No. 1 (Spring 1919), pp.12-20
