= John Slater =

John Slater may refer to:

== Business and government ==
- John Slater (industrialist) (1776–1843), (American) father of John Fox Slater, brother and partner of Samuel Slater
- John Fox Slater (1815–1884), American philanthropist, son of John Slater (industrialist)
- John Slater (art director) (1877–1914), art director at Doulton's Burslem factory
- John Slater (New Zealand politician), former President of the New Zealand National Party and current President of Citizens and Ratepayers Now
- John Slater (British politician) (1889–1935), British Conservative MP for Eastbourne, 1932–1935
- John Slater (Canadian politician) (1952–2015), Member of the Legislative Assembly of British Columbia
- John J. Slater Jr. (1925–1998), American lawyer and politician in Massachusetts
- John Slater & Co. of Forestdale, Rhode Island

== Others ==
- John C. Slater (1900–1976), American physicist and theoretical chemist
- J. D. Slater (born 1954 or 1955), filmmaker and composer
- John Slater (actor) (1916–1975), British actor specialising in Cockney parts
- John Slater (cricketer) (1795–?), English cricketer
- John Slater (figure skater) (1935–1989), British figure skater and ice dancer
- John Slater, former guitarist with Blaze Bayley
- John Slater (trade unionist) (1920–1974), British trade union leader
- John Samuel Slater (1850–1911), British professor of civil engineering
