= William Slater =

William, Bill, Billy or Willie Slater may refer to:

- William Slater (architect) (1819–1872), English architect
- William Slater (cricketer) (1790–1852), English cricketer
- William Slater (swimmer) (born 1940), Canadian swimmer
- William Slater (Tennessee politician), (born 1961), American politician from Tennessee
- William A. Slater (1857–1919), American businessman, art collector, and philanthropist
- Bill Slater (broadcaster) (1902–1965), American educator, sports announcer, and radio/television personality
- Bill Slater (footballer) (1927–2018), English footballer
- Bill Slater (politician) (1890–1960), Australian lawyer, politician and diplomat
- Billy Slater (born 1983), Australian rugby league footballer
- Billy Slater (footballer) (1858–?), English footballer
- Willie J. Slater, American football coach and player
- Edward Slater (1917–2016), also known as Bill Slater, Australian biochemist
