= Henry Charles Otter =

- Born: 1807; Derbyshire, England
- Died: March 26, 1876 (aged 69) Hampshire, England
- Allegiance: United Kingdom
- Branch: Royal Navy
- Service years: 1822–1870
- Rank: Rear-admiral
- Commands: HMS Sparrow; HMS Avon; HMS Alban; HMS Firefly; HMS Porcupine
- Known for: Hydrographic surveying of Scotland; Supporting the 1858 transatlantic cable
- Conflicts: Crimean War; Battle of Bomarsund; Bombardment of Brandon
- Spouse: Jemima Otter

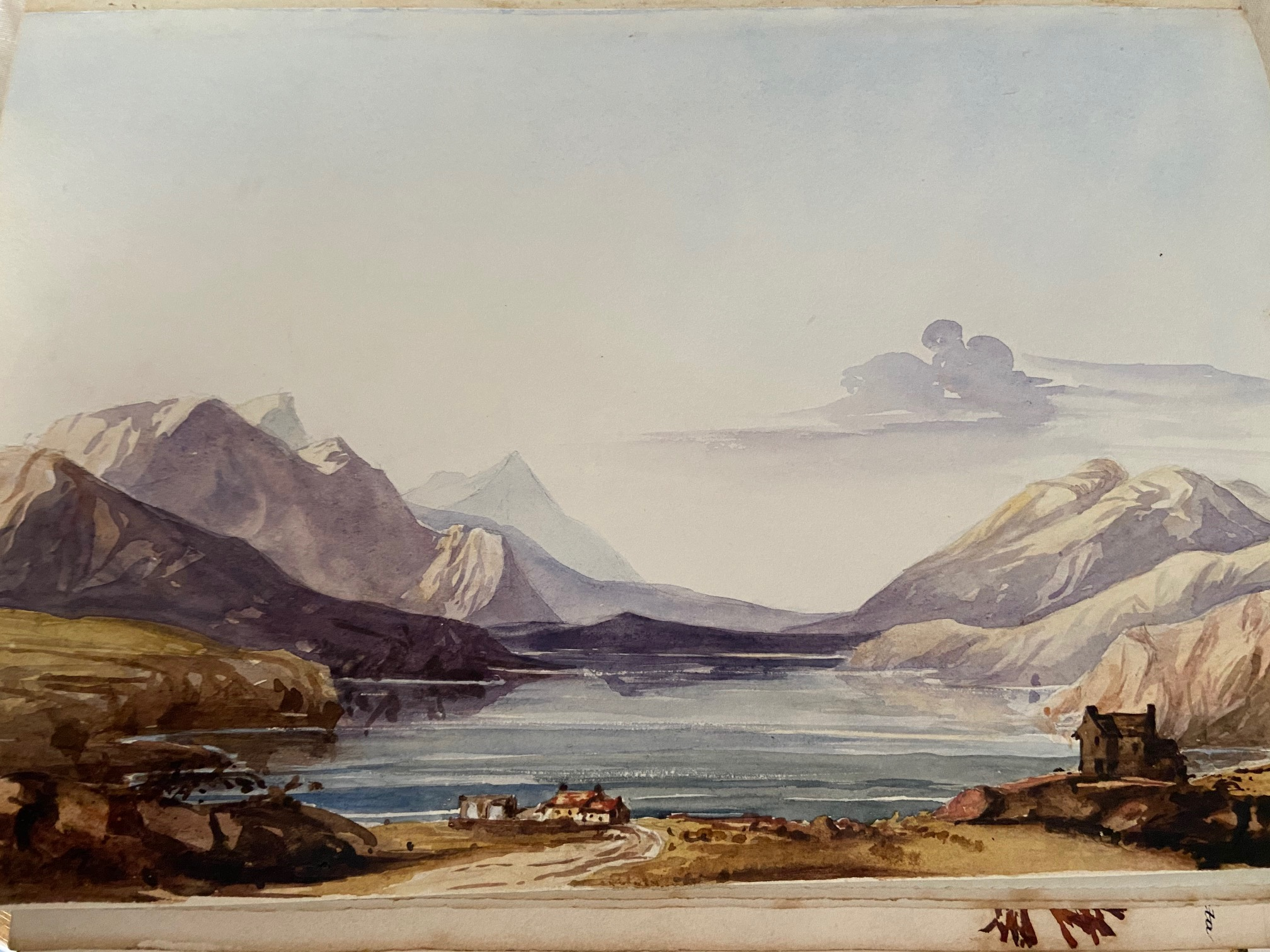
Otter's 1844 watercolour of the Kyle of Durness

Henry Charles Otter (1807 – 26 March 1876) was a Royal Navy officer and hydrographic surveyor, noted for his work in charting Scotland in the mid-19th century. He was active in surveying in the Baltic Sea during the war with Russia (1853-6) and in supporting the laying of the first transatlantic telegraph cable in 1858.

== Biography ==
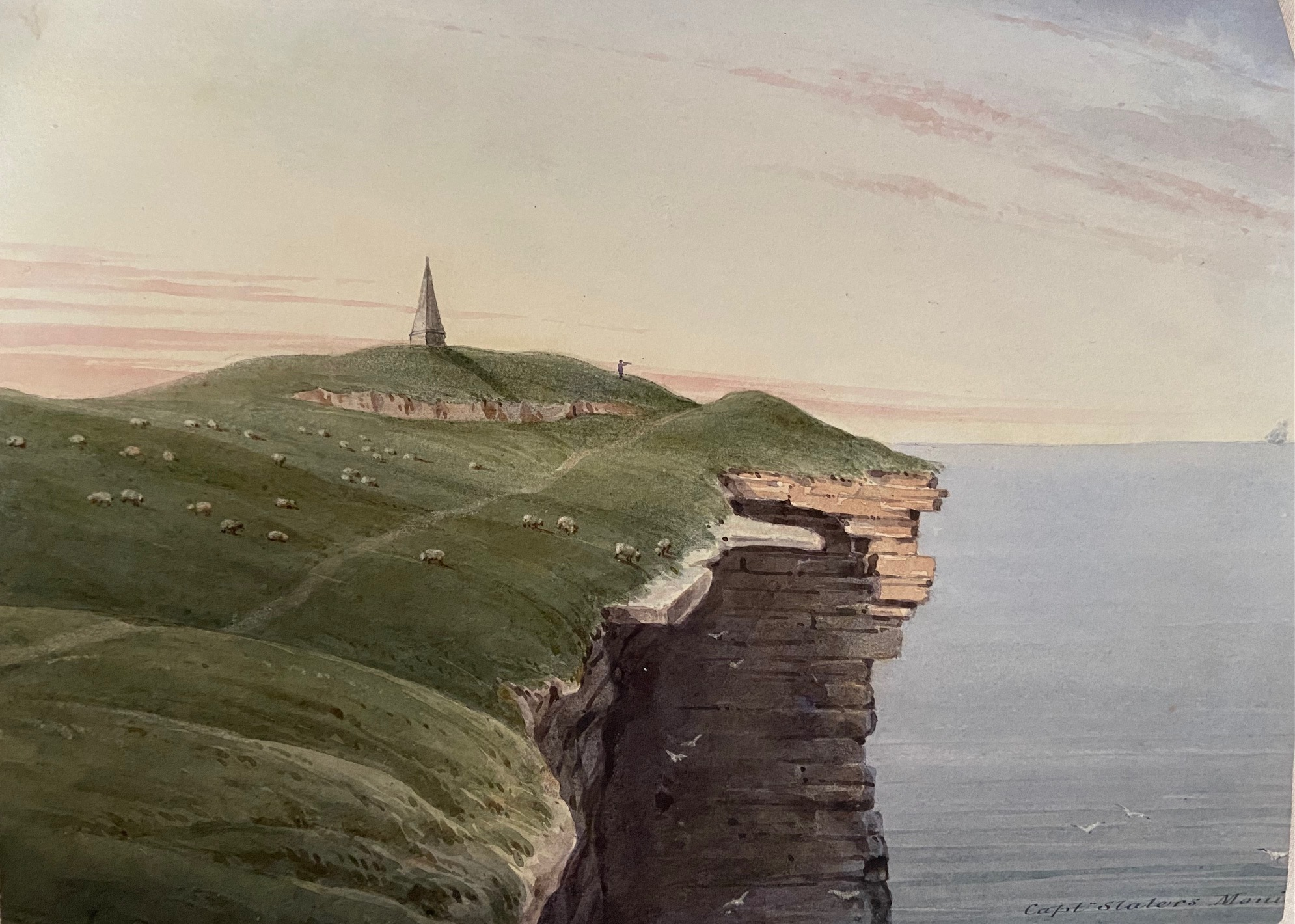
Otter's 1844 watercolour of the monument to Captain Slater

Henry Otter was born in Derbyshire in 1807. He joined the Royal Navy in January 1822, and passed his examination in 1828. In 1832, as lieutenant, he was appointed assistant to Lieutenant Michael Slater in surveying the north-east coast of England.

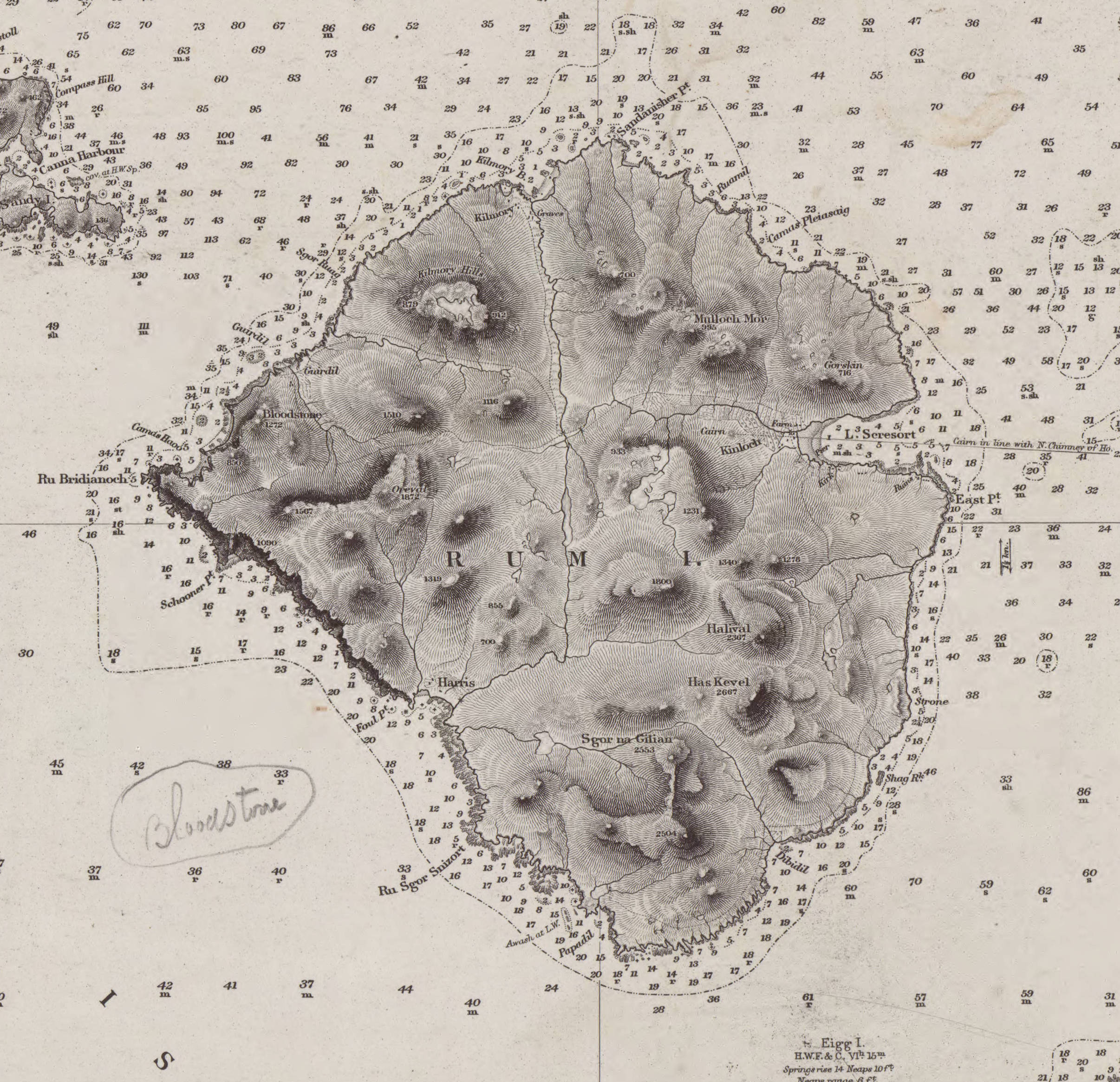
The Island of Rùm, in the Small Isles, from the Otter and Wood surveys of 1852–64. It would be 20 years before the Ordnance Survey mapped this area

The survey then moved on to Scotland, where Slater died, in February 1842, falling from Holborn Head, a headland near Scrabster, very likely by suicide. Otter then took charge of the survey of Scotland, which occupied him for most of the next twenty years, and resulted in the publication of over 40 Admiralty charts. He was elected a Fellow of the Royal Astronomical Society in November 1842. He was promoted to commander in 1844 when he was given command of HMS Sparrow and then commanded the paddle steamer Avon from 1847. As well as charting the waters and coast of Scotland, the survey covered the terrain for three miles inland. As the Ordnance Survey had yet to reach most of Scotland, the Admiralty survey provided the first accurate maps for many coastal regions, including the Cuillin Hills of Skye and the Small Isles

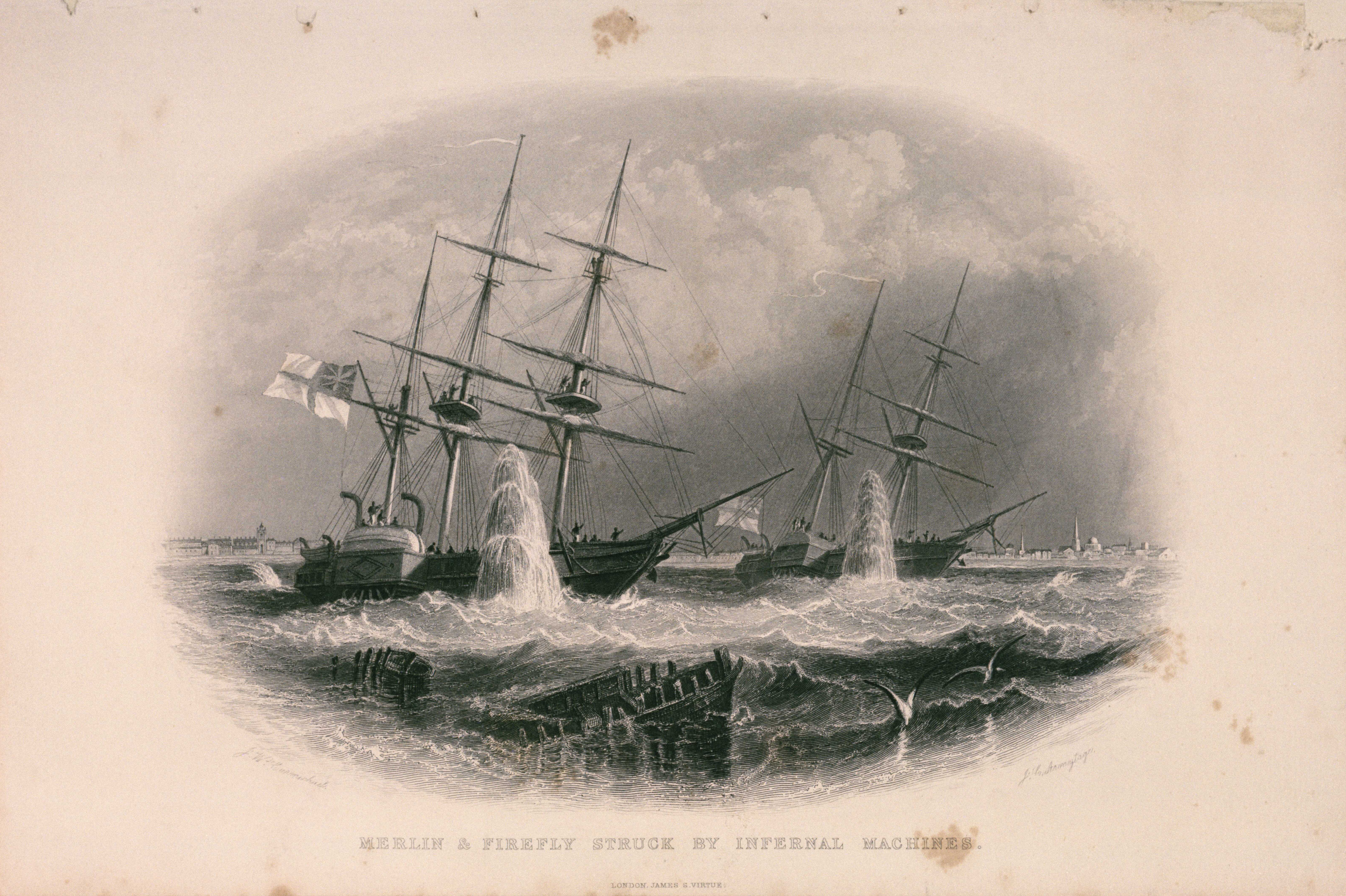
'Firefly' (with three masts on left) and 'Merlin' struck by mines in the Gulf of Finland

During the war with Russia, Otter in HMS Alban took part in the surveys carried out in the Baltic, under the command of Bartholomew Sulivan, in support of fleet operations. The most successful action was the capture and destruction of the fort at Bomarsund, located where the Gulf of Finland and the Gulf of Bothnia join the Baltic, in August 1854. The surveys of the channels between the various islands of Åland were crucial in enabling the transport of the French and British troops to their landing places. Otter was promoted to captain in September 1854. The following year, Otter was in command of HMS Firefly. On 9 June, while surveying near the fortress of Kronstadt, the Firefly and HMS Merlin were struck by mines ("infernal machines"). Both ships were damaged, but neither was put out of action. This was one of the first successful uses of mines in naval warfare. In early August, Firefly bombarded Brandon, the port and shipbuilding centre near Vasa, destroying the magazines and also capturing several vessels and stores.

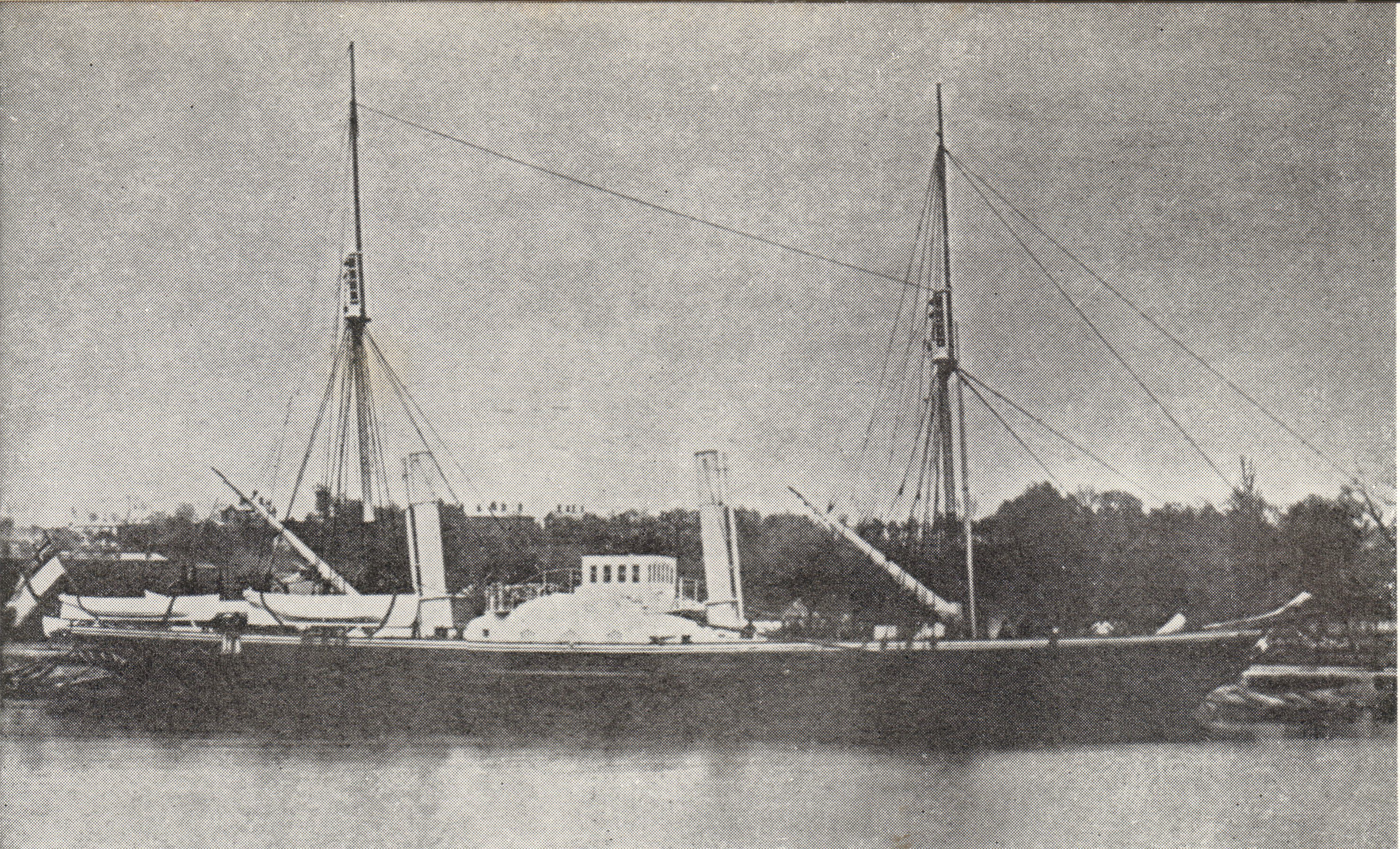
HMS Porcupine, a 350 ton paddle-steamer

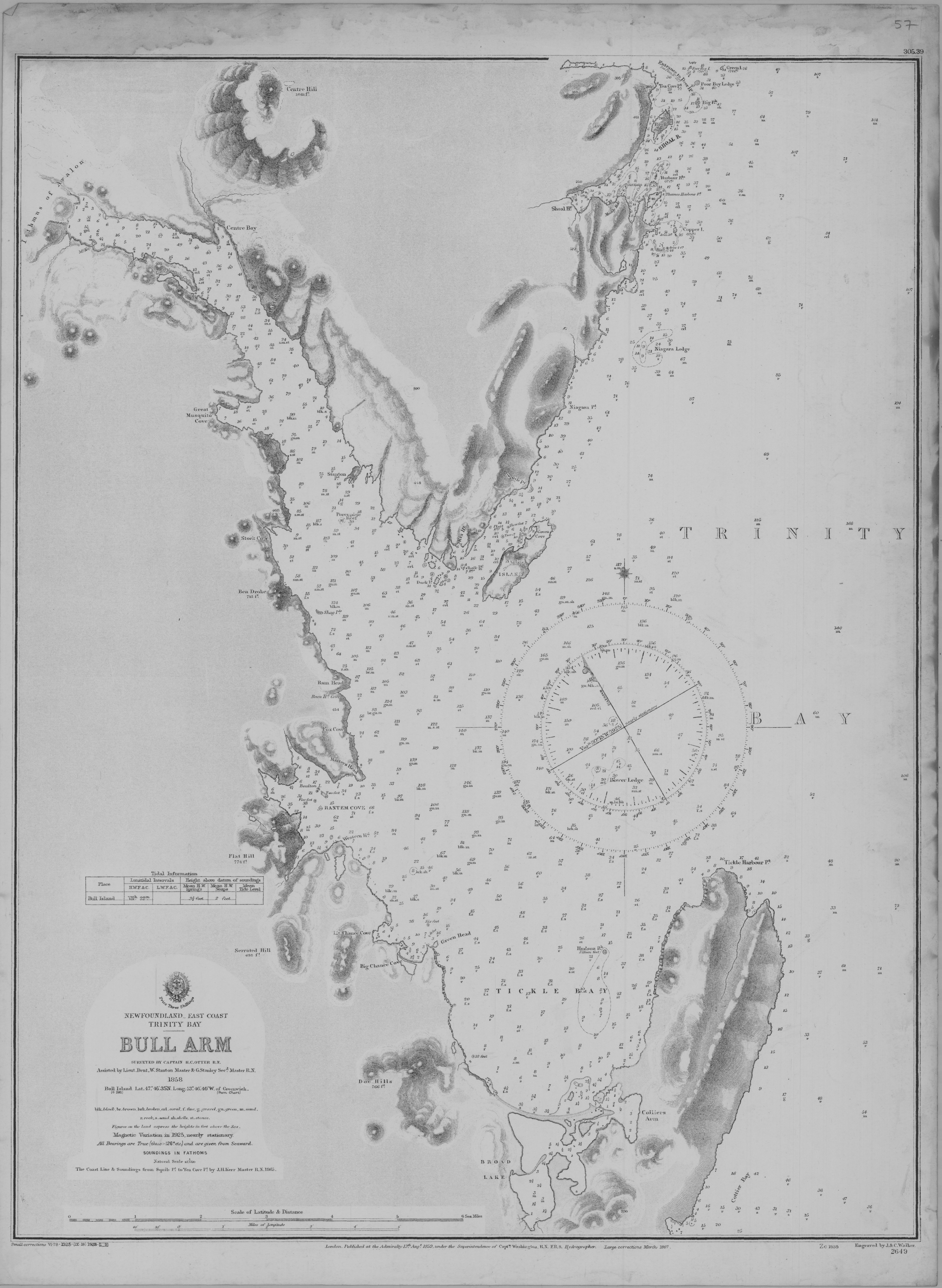
Admiralty Chart of Bull Arm, surveyed by Otter

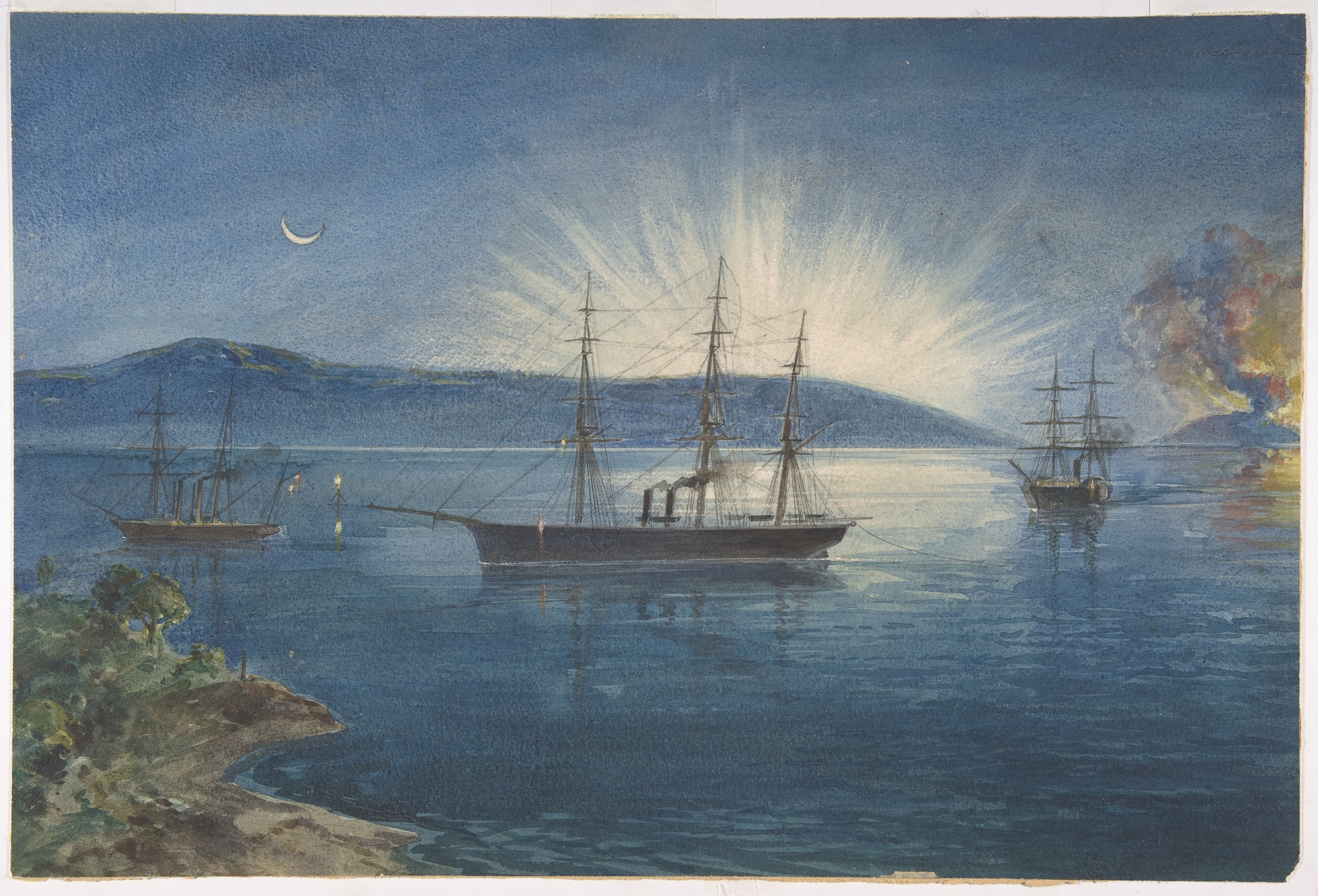
Bonfires lighted on the hills to notify of the arrival of the cable fleet in Newfoundland on August 5th, 1858

Otter returned to home waters, took command of HMS Porcupine in May 1856, and resumed the survey of Scotland. In 1858 he and Porcupine crossed the Atlantic to assist in the laying of the first transatlantic telegraph cable. The western terminus of the cable was at Bull Arm, Trinity Bay, Newfoundland. Otter surveyed the area, then guided the cable ship into the bay. The ships' crews then had to carry the cable to the station, about half a mile inland. The onward connections between the station on Trinity Bay and existing networks in Canada and the USA had already been made, and connection was soon established between London and New York. However within a few weeks the signals weakened, then disappeared. The insulation of the cable proved not to be satisfactory. Though the cable had failed, the laying was not at fault, and the practicality of the project was established. Technical advances would lead to the successful cable in 1866.

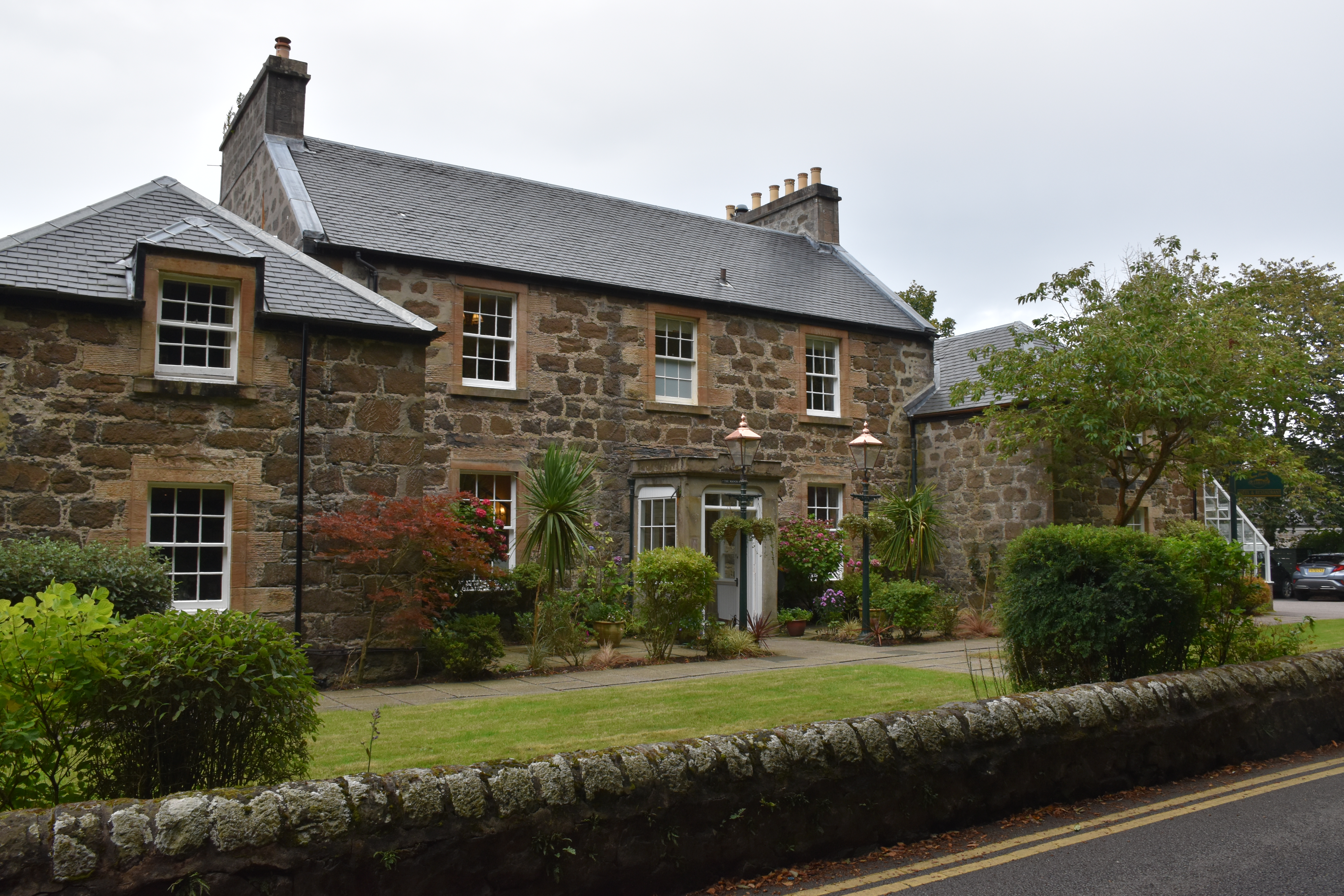
Manor House, the Otters' home in Oban

Otter and his wife Jemima made their home in Scotland, buying Manor House, in Oban, in 1845. Otter was a frequent visitor to the remote islands of St Kilda, not always on Admiralty business. On one occasion, he rescued the factor and his crew, whose boat had been wrecked in Village Bay, and who otherwise would have had to stay on the Island for the winter. He shipped fish for the islanders, sold them on the mainland, and passed the proceeds back to them. He transported Free Church ministers to the Island. Infant mortality on St Kilda was high, the "eight-day sickness", and Otter believed that this was due to a diet that was high in oils, particularly from fulmars. When Ann Gillies, A St Kilda woman, was expecting a child in 1860, Henry and Jemima encouraged her in a diet of cocoa, meat and biscuit. After eleven years, Ann and her husband Norman had only two surviving children. This child survived and throve. The grateful couple called the child Mary Jemima Otter Gillies. Unfortunately diet turned out not to be the solution for infant mortality in general. In October 1860 there was a great storm that affected much of western and northern Europe. Otter was in St Kilda at the time, and witnessed its devastating effects on boats, on houses in the village, and on crops, though Porcupine survived. When a relief fund was successfully launched in Glasgow and the west of Scotland, distribution was entrusted to Otter.

The grave of Henry Charles Otter in Crondall in Hampshire

Otter retired with the rank of rear-admiral in 1870, and died in Hampshire, England, in 1876. He was buried in the churchyard of All Saints Church in Crondall in Hampshire.

== Bibliography ==
- Otter, Henry C. (1858). "On the Tides in the Sound of Harris". The Edinburgh New Philosophical Journal. 7: 272–276.
- Otter, Henry C.; Stanton, William (1859). Western or Outer Hebrides. Sailing Directions for the Sound of Harris. Hydrographic Department of the Admiralty.
- Otter, Henry C.; McDougall, G.F. (1867). West coast of Scotland pilot. Hydrographic Office of the Admiralty. Sixth Edition 1911: Part I; Part II.
