= Robert Salter =

Robert Salter may refer to:

- Robert B. Salter (1924–2010), Canadian surgeon
- Robert M. Salter (1920–2011), RAND Corporation engineer
- Robert A. Salter (1972- ), CEO Rowan Tree Scientific Limited

== See also ==
- Robert Slater (disambiguation)
