= Henry Slater =

Henry Slater may refer to:

- Henry Slater (cricketer, born 1839) (1839–1905), English cricketer
- Henry Slater (cricketer, born 1855) (1855–1916), English cricketer
- Henry Slater (MP), Member of Parliament (MP) for Portsmouth
- Henry H. Slater (1851–1934), English clergyman and naturalist
- Henry Slater, character in The Pagan

== See also ==
- Harry Slater (disambiguation)
- Henry Slate (1910–1996), American actor
- Henry Slatter (1830–1902), British trade union leader
