= César Milstein =

Argentine biochemist (1927–2002)

César Milstein CH FRS
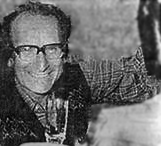
- Born: 8 October 1927; Bahía Blanca, Argentina
- Died: 24 March 2002 (aged 74); Cambridge, England
- Education: University of Buenos Aires; University of Cambridge
- Known for: Receiving Nobel Prize "for theories concerning the specificity in development and control of the immune system and the discovery of the principle for production of monoclonal antibodies"
- Spouse: Celia Prilleltensky (m. 1953)
- Awards: Rosenstiel Award (1978); Louisa Gross Horwitz Prize (1980); Wolf Prize in Medicine (1980); William Bate Hardy Prize (1981); Sir Hans Krebs Medal (1981); Franklin Medal (1982); Carlos J. Finlay Prize for Microbiology (1983); Nobel Prize in Physiology or Medicine (1984); Copley Medal (1989)
- Scientific career
- Fields: Biochemistry
- Doctoral advisor: Andrés O.M. Stoppani

César Milstein, CH, FRS (8 October 1927 – 24 March 2002) was an Argentine biochemist in the field of antibody research. Milstein shared the Nobel Prize in Physiology or Medicine in 1984 with Niels Kaj Jerne and Georges J. F. Köhler for developing the hybridoma technique for the production of monoclonal antibodies.

== Biography ==
Milstein was born in Bahía Blanca, Argentina. His parents were Máxima (Vanarks) and Lázaro Milstein, a Jewish Ukrainian immigrant. He graduated from the University of Buenos Aires and obtained a PhD under Professor Stopani (Professor of Biochemistry). Later he became a member of the Medical Research Council Laboratory of Molecular Biology, Cambridge, England; he acquired British citizenship and had dual British-Argentinian nationality. In 1956, he received an award from the Sociedad Argentina de Investigación en Bioquímica (SAIB) for his work on enzyme kinetics with the enzyme aldehyde dehydrogenase. In 1958, funded by the British Council, he joined the Biochemistry Department at the University of Cambridge to work for a PhD under Malcolm Dixon on the mechanism of metal activation of the enzyme phosphoglucomutase. During this work, he collaborated with Frederick Sanger, whose group he joined with a short-term Medical Research Council appointment.

== Career ==
Science will only fulfill its promises when the benefits are equally shared by the really poor of the world

— César Milstein

The major part of Milstein's research career was devoted to studying the structure of antibodies and the mechanism by which antibody diversity is generated. It was as part of this quest that, in 1975, he worked with Georges Köhler (a postdoctoral fellow in his laboratory) to develop the hybridoma technique for the production of monoclonal antibodies—a discovery recognized by the award of the 1984 Nobel Prize for Physiology or Medicine. This discovery led to an enormous expansion in the exploitation of antibodies in science and medicine. The term hybridoma was coined by Leonard Herzenberg during his sabbatical in Milstein's laboratory between 1976 and 1977.

Milstein himself made many major contributions to improvements and developments in monoclonal antibody technology—especially in the use of monoclonal antibodies to provide markers that allow distinction between different cell types. In collaboration with Claudio Cuello, he helped lay the foundation for the use of monoclonal antibodies as probes for the investigation of the pathological pathways in neurological disorders as well as many other diseases. These advances in biology and clinical medicine would take several years to realize their potential. Milstein and Cuello's work also enabled the use of monoclonal antibodies to enhance the power of immuno-based diagnostic tests. In addition, Milstein foresaw the potential wealth of ligand-binding reagents that could result from applying recombinant DNA technology to monoclonal antibodies and inspired the development of the field of antibody engineering, which was to lead to safer and more powerful monoclonal antibodies for use as therapeutics.

Milstein's early work on antibodies focused on their diversity at the amino acid level, as well as on the disulfide bonds by which they were held together. Part of this work was done in collaboration with his wife, Celia. The emphasis of his research then shifted towards the mRNA encoding antibodies, where he was able to provide the first evidence for the existence of a precursor for these secreted polypeptides that contained a signal sequence. The development of the hybridoma technology coupled to advances in nucleic acid sequencing allowed Milstein to chart the changes that occurred in antibodies following antigen encounter. He demonstrated the importance of somatic hypermutation of immunoglobulin V genes in antibody affinity maturation. In this process, localized mutation of the immunoglobulin genes allows the production of improved antibodies, which make a major contribution to protective immunity and immunological memory. Much of his work in later years was devoted to characterizing this mutational process with a view to understanding its mechanism. He contributed a manuscript for publication on this topic less than a week before he died.

Quite apart from his own achievements, Milstein acted as a guide and inspiration to many in the antibody field, as well as devoting himself to assisting science and scientists in less developed countries. Milstein patented the production of monoclonal antibodies, and held three other patents.

== Awards and honours ==
In addition to the Nobel Prize in 1984, Milstein was elected a Fellow of the Royal Society (FRS) in 1975, was a fellow of Darwin College, Cambridge, from 1980 to 2002, awarded the Louisa Gross Horwitz Prize from Columbia University in 1980, he was awarded the Wolf Prize in Medicine in 1980, he won the Copley Medal in 1989, and became a Member of the Order of the Companions of Honour in 1995. In 1993, the Argentinian Konex Foundation granted him the Diamond Konex Award, one of the most prestigious cultural awards of Argentina, as the most important scientist in the last decade of his country.

== Personal life ==
Milstein married Celia Prilleltensky in 1953.

Milstein died early on 24 March 2002, in Cambridge, England, at age 74, as a result of a heart condition that he had suffered from for many years. His wife died in 2020 aged 92.

The film Un fueguito, la historia de César Milstein was released in 2010. Directed by Ana Fraile, the film was awarded Best Documentary by the Academy of Film in Argentina.

== See also ==
- List of Jewish Nobel laureates
