= Robert Slater (disambiguation) =

Robert Slater (1943–2014) was an American author and journalist.

Robert Slater may also refer to:

- Robert J. Slater aka "Doc Slater" (1837-1902), gambler and political boss in Baltimore, Maryland, USA
- Robert W. Slater, Canadian environmental policy leader
- Robert Slater (bowls), English lawn bowls player
- Rob Slater (1960–1995), American mountaineer
- Robbie Slater (born 1964), English-born Australian footballer and sports commentator
- Bert Slater (1936–2006), Scottish footballer
- Robert Kelly Slater (born 1972), American professional surfer

== See also ==
- Bob Slater (1934–1994), Australian rules footballer
- Robert Salter (disambiguation)
