= Raging Stallion Studios =

American pornographic film studio

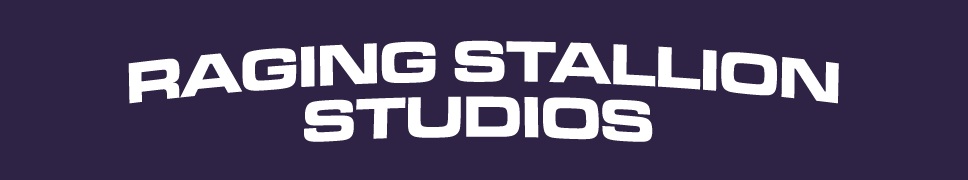
- Type: Private
- Industry: Gay pornography
- Founded: 1998; 28 years ago
- Founder: Chris Ward; J. D. Slater
- Headquarters: San Francisco, United States
- Key people: Chris Ward; J. D. Slater; Michael Brandon
- Products: Pornographic films
- Owner: Gamma Entertainment
- Website: www.ragingstallion.com

Raging Stallion Studios is an independent major adult film studio based in San Francisco. It is one of the world's largest producers of gay pornography. It was founded by Chris Ward and J. D. Slater; Michael Brandon later became a co-owner.

In 2005, Raging Stallion released 22 films. In 2009, Raging Stallion merged with AEBN/NakedSword.com. AEBN then purchased Falcon Studios in 2010.

RSS has taken inspiration from pop culture for some of its movies.

In 2018, it started producing bareback movies.

== Awards ==
- 2010 XBIZ Award – Gay Movie of the Year (Focus/Refocus)
- 2011 XBIZ Award – Gay Movie of the Year (Brutal)

== See also ==
- CzechBoys
