= List of fellows of the Royal Society elected in 1975 =

Fellows of the Royal Society elected in 1975.

== Fellows ==
1. Arthur Erdélyi (1908–1977)
2. Peter Christopher Caldwell (1927–1979)
3. Sir John Charnley (1911–1982)
4. Richard Weck (1913–1986)
5. James Munro Dodd (1915–1986)
6. Patrick Alfred Pierce Moran (1917–1988)
7. Denis Arthur Haydon (1930–1988)
8. Geoffrey Morse Binnie (1908–1989)
9. Reginald Charles Rainey (1913–1990)
10. Edward George Bowen (1911–1991)
11. Keith Dalziel (1921–1994)
12. Paul Jose de Mayo (1924–1994)
13. Sir Barry Albert Cross (1925–1994)
14. Raymond John Heaphy Beverton (1922–1995)
15. Sir George Malcolm Brown (1925–1997)
16. John Wyrill Christian (1926–2001)
17. Cesar Milstein (1927–2002)
18. Sir Robert Wilson (1927–2002)
19. Sir Godfrey Newbold Hounsfield (1919–2004)
20. George P. L. Walker (1926–2005)
21. Dame Anne McLaren (1927–2007)
22. Stanley Hay Umphray Bowie (1917–2008)
23. Andrew R. Lang (1924–2008)
24. Boris P. Stoicheff (1924–2010)
25. Anthony Milner Lane (d. 2011)
26. Ralph Owen Slatyer (1929–2012)
27. A. David Buckingham
28. Sir Ronald Mason
29. Edward Charles Slater
30. Sir David Cecil Smith
31. Frederick Whatley
32. Sir Christopher Zeeman

== Foreign members ==
1. Henry Gilman (1893–1986)
2. Michael Heidelberger (1888–1991)
3. Feodor Lynen (1911–1979)
4. Lars Onsager (1903–1976)
