= Jim Slater =

Jim Slater may refer to:

- Jim Slater (accountant) (1929–2015), British investor and business writer
- Jim Slater (footballer) (1884–1970), Australian rules footballer
- Jim Slater (ice hockey) (born 1982), American ice hockey center
- Jim Slater (trade unionist) (1923–1993), Communist and British trade union leader

== See also ==
- James Slater (disambiguation)
