= CzechBoys =

Czech pornographic film company and distributor

CzechBoys.com
- Type: Private
- Industry: Gay pornography
- Founded: 1999
- Headquarters: Prague, Czech Republic
- Products: Internet pornography and Pornographic films
- Owner: Pavel Rada
- Website: CzechBoys.com

CzechBoys is an adult film studio, adult website and adult content provider in the gay pornography niche. CzechBoys was founded in 1999 by Pavel Rada and is based in Prague, Czech Republic. The company's primary website, CzechBoys.com, is presented in the format of a gay erotic online magazine of which a new issue is published daily.

In 2003 CzechBoys became a content provider for the online gay adult industry with the launch of CzechBoysContent.com. In 2006, the company expanded from leased content to the sale of exclusive content and partnered with Pistol Media, a division of Raging Stallion Studios to offer a gay erotic video plug in for adult websites.

== Awards and nominations ==
CzechBoys has been nominated for numerous awards dating back to 2002, where it received a nomination from the Gay Entertainment Awards in the category "Best Gay Adult Pay Site on the Net". CzechBoys was nominated for four awards at the European Gay Porn Awards and took home the award for "Best Twink Site". The most recent CzechBoys DVD nomination was in the 2010 Gay Video Awards for Twink Party Volume 7, in which Lucky Tailor (a.k.a. Lukaso) was among the "Best Top Performer Foreign Nominees".

== Partial videography ==
- Twink Party (Vol. 1–7)
