= Allan MacLeod Cormack =

South African and American physicist

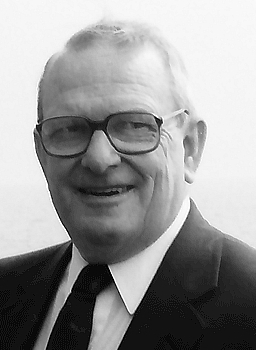
- Born: February 23, 1924; Johannesburg, South Africa
- Died: May 7, 1998 (aged 74); Winchester, Massachusetts, U.S.
- Education: Rondebosch Boys' High School; University of Cape Town; St John's College, Cambridge
- Known for: Computed tomography
- Awards: Nobel Prize in Physiology or Medicine (1979); National Medal of Science (1990)
- Scientific career
- Fields: Physics
- Workplaces: Tufts University

Allan MacLeod Cormack (February 23, 1924 – May 7, 1998) was a South African and American physicist, academic, and Nobel Laureate. He was Professor of Physics at Tufts University and won the 1979 Nobel Prize in Physiology or Medicine (along with Godfrey Hounsfield) for his work on X-ray computed tomography (CT), a significant and unusual achievement since Cormack did not hold a doctoral degree in any scientific field.

== Early life and education ==
Cormack was born on February 23, 1924, in Johannesburg, South Africa. He attended Rondebosch Boys' High School in Cape Town, where he was active in the debating and tennis teams. He received his B.Sc. in physics in 1944 from the University of Cape Town and his M.Sc. in crystallography in 1945 from the same institution. He was a doctoral student at Cambridge University from 1947 to 1949, and while at Cambridge he met his future wife, Barbara Seavey, an American physics student.

== Career ==
After marrying Seavey, he returned to the University of Cape Town in early 1950 to lecture. Following a sabbatical at Harvard in 1956–57, the couple agreed to move to the United States, and Cormack became a professor at Tufts University in the fall of 1957. Cormack became a naturalized citizen of the United States in 1966. Although he was mainly working on particle physics, Cormack's side interest in x-ray technology led him to develop the theoretical underpinnings of CT scanning. This work was initiated at the University of Cape Town and Groote Schuur Hospital in early 1956 and continued briefly in mid-1957 after returning from his sabbatical. His results were subsequently published in two papers in the Journal of Applied Physics in 1963 and 1964. These papers generated little interest until Hounsfield and colleagues built the first CT scanner in 1971 in the UK, taking Cormack's theoretical calculations into a real application. For their independent efforts, Cormack and Hounsfield shared the 1979 Nobel Prize in Physiology or Medicine. It is notable that the two built a very similar type of device without collaboration in different parts of the world. He was member of the International Academy of Science, Munich. In 1990, he was awarded the National Medal of Science.

== Death ==
Cormack died of cancer in Winchester, Massachusetts, at age 74. He was posthumously awarded the Order of Mapungubwe on December 10, 2002, for outstanding achievements as a scientist and for co-inventing the CT scanner.
