= Slaten =

Slaten is a surname. Notable people with the surname include:

- Doug Slaten (1980–2016), American baseball player
- Justin Slaten (born 1997), American baseball player
- Troy Slaten (born 1975), American actor and attorney

== See also ==
- Slaten-LaMarsh House, a historic house in Grafton, Illinois, U.S.
- Slater (surname)
