= Michael Atwell Slater =

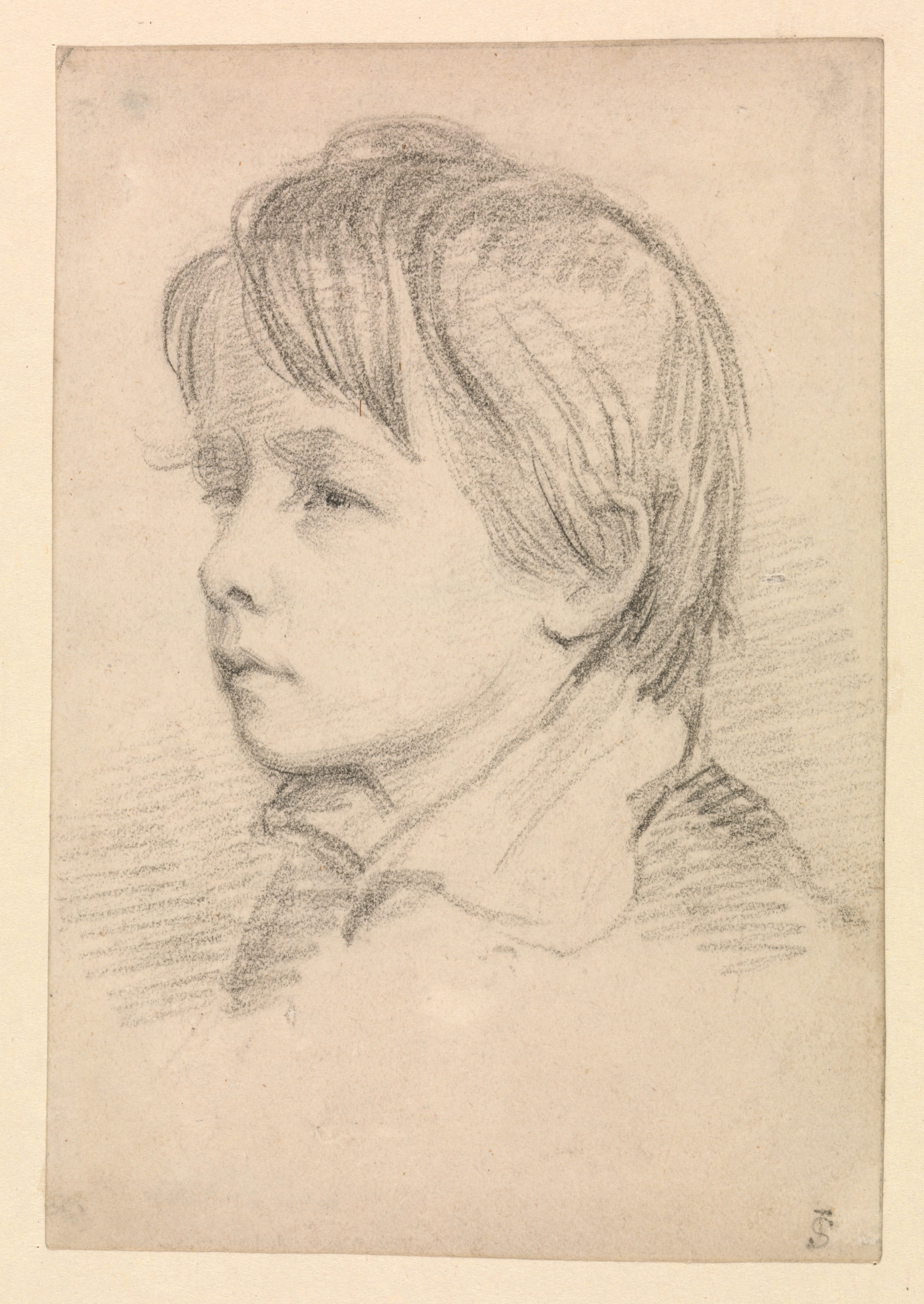
Michael Atwell Slater as a boy, drawn by his brother, Joseph Slater Jr.

Michael Atwell Slater (died 2 February 1842) was a Royal Navy Officer and hydrographic surveyor particularly noted for his survey work in the north-east of England and the east of Scotland.

== Biography ==
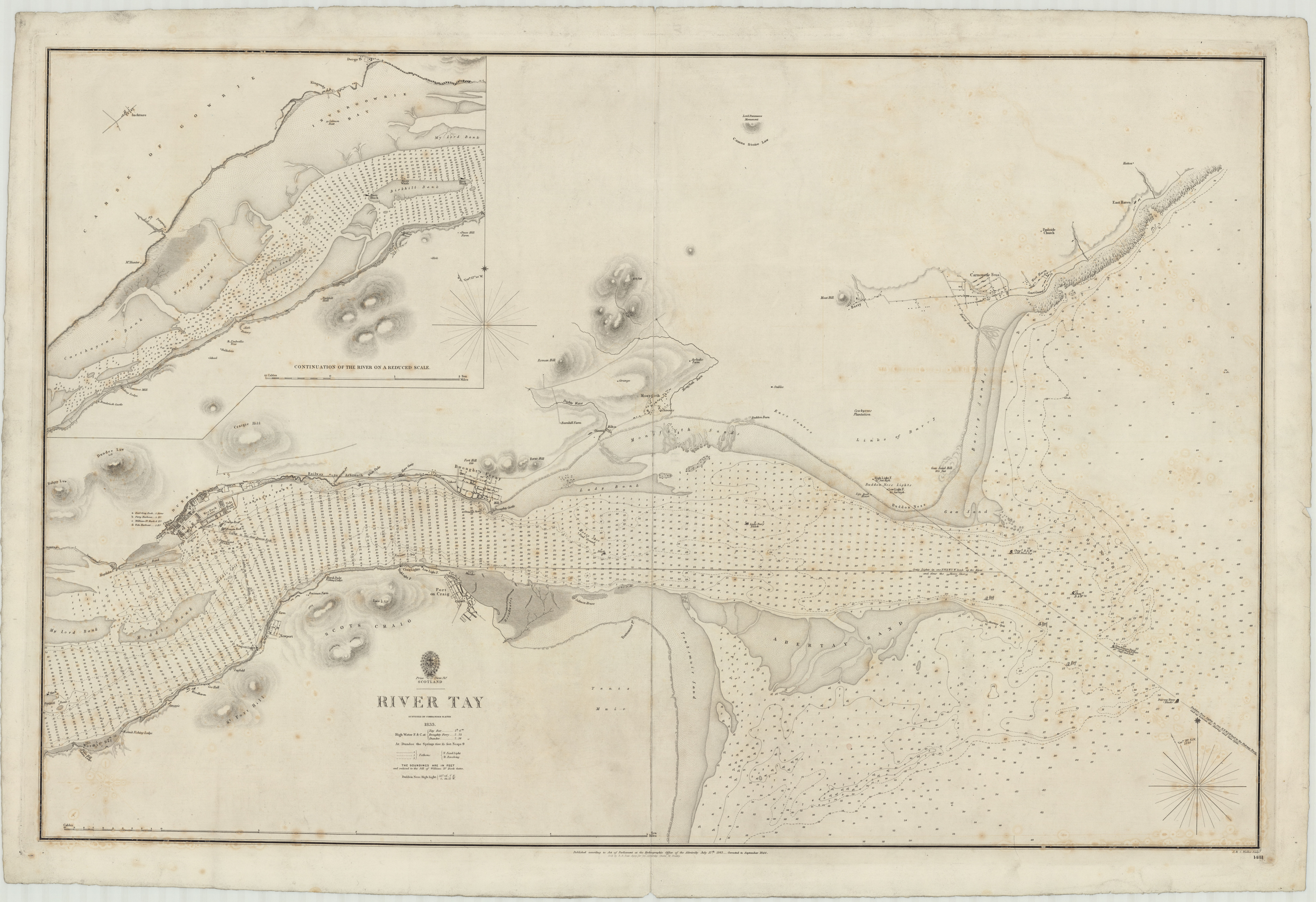
Slater's chart of the River Tay, surveyed in 1833

Slater's date of birth is not known. His father, Joseph Slater of Bromley, and his brother, Joseph Slater Jr. were both artists. Michael Slater entered the Royal Navy in 1811, and in 1816 was surveying in the Mediterranean as an assistant to William Henry Smyth. He started working in Great Britain in 1829, surveying the coasts of Durham, Northumberland and eastern Scotland. His work led to the publication of over 20 Admiralty Charts, and he contributed to the North Sea Pilot Part 2 - sailing directions for the North and East Coasts of Scotland. He was promoted to Commander in 1837.

Surveying work was used for planning purposes, as well as for navigation. In 1839 Slater gave evidence to a Parliamentary committee considering improvements to the Caledonian Canal. He described the hazards in the approach to the canal through the Moray Firth and the Kessock Narrows, and made recommendations for the location of buoys and lights.

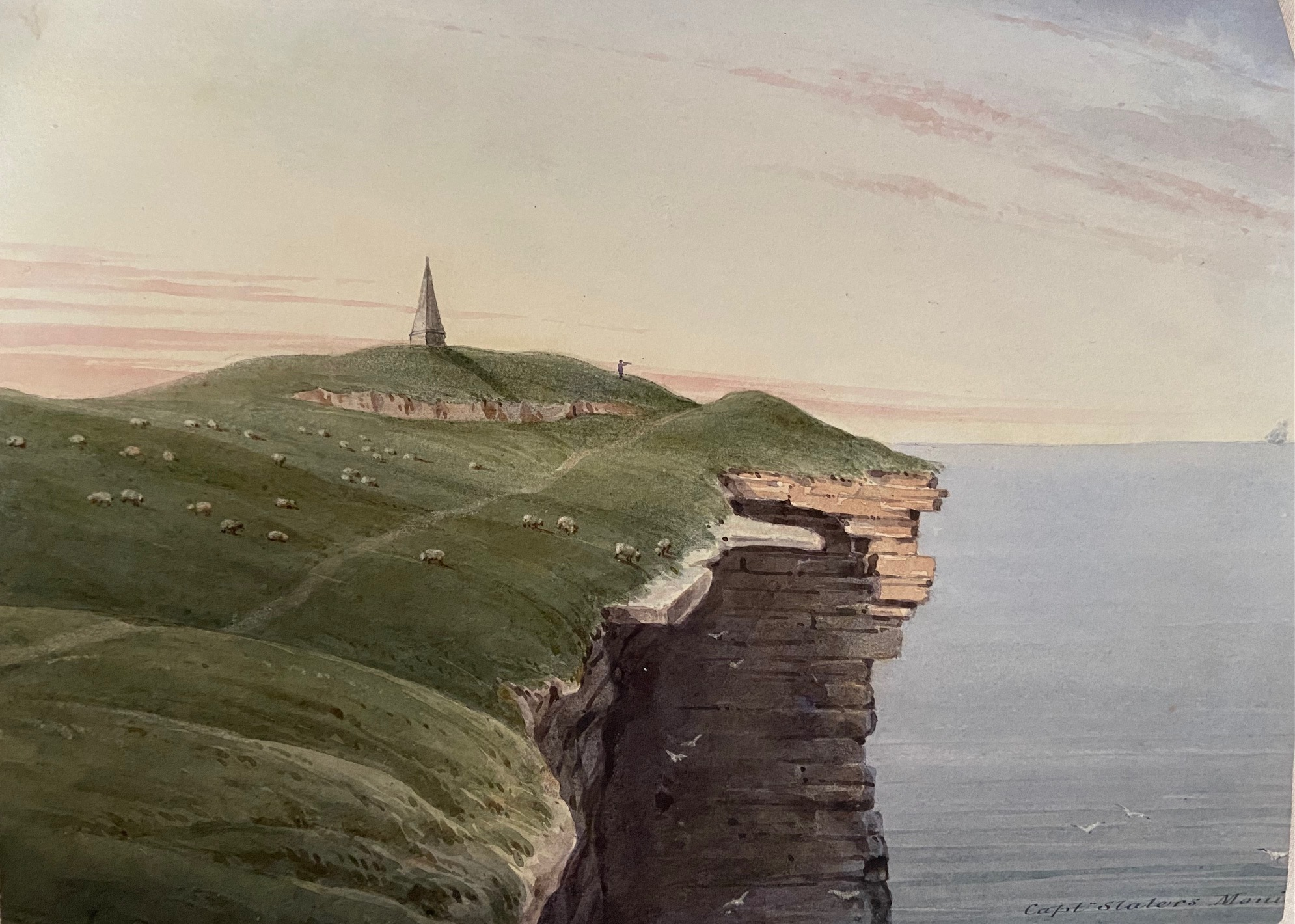
Monument to Slater (Slater's Loup) near Holborn Head. Watercolour by Otter, Slater's successor

He died on 2 February 1842, falling from Holborn Head, a cliff near Scrabster. very likely by suicide. He left a widow, Antonetta, but had no children. His assistant Henry Charles Otter then took over the survey of Scotland, continuing around to the west of Scotland.
