= HMS Sparrow (1828) =

Cutter of the Royal Navy

History

United Kingdom
- Name: Sparrow
- Namesake: Sparrow
- Ordered: 20 March 1819
- Builder: Pembroke Dockyard
- Laid down: October 1827
- Launched: 28 June 1828
- Commissioned: 18 July 1828
- Home port: Portsmouth Dockyard
- Fate: Broken up, August 1860

General characteristics
- Class & type: Bramble-class cutter
- Tons burthen: 163 13/94 bm
- Length: 70 ft 9 in (21.6 m) (gundeck); 52 ft 4 in (16.0 m) (keel)
- Beam: 24 ft 3 in (7.4 m)
- Draught: 10 ft (3.0 m)
- Depth: 11 ft (3.4 m)
- Sail plan: Fore-and-aft rig
- Complement: 50
- Armament: 2 × 6-pdr cannon; 8 × 12-pdr carronades

HMS Sparrow was a 10-gun Bramble-class cutter built for the Royal Navy during the 1820s. She was broken up in August 1860.

== Description ==
Sparrow had a length at the gundeck of 70 feet 9 inches (21.6 m) and 52 feet 4 inches (16.0 m) at the keel. She had a beam of 24 feet 3 inches (7.4 m), a draught of about 10 feet (3.0 m) and a depth of hold of 11 feet (3.4 m). The ship's tonnage was 163 13/94 tons burthen. The Bramble class was armed with two 6-pounder cannon and eight 12-pounder carronades. The ships had a crew of 50 officers and ratings.

== Construction and career ==
Sparrow, the third ship of her name to serve in the Royal Navy, was ordered on 20 March 1819, laid down in October 1827 at Pembroke Dockyard, Wales, and launched on 28 June 1828. She was commissioned on 18 July and based at Portsmouth Dockyard.
