= James Slater =

James Slater may refer to:

- James A. Slater, American zoologist and educator
- James Anderson Slater (1896–1925), British World War I flying ace
- James H. Slater (1826–1899), United States Representative and Senator from Oregon
- James Kirkwood Slater (1900–1965), British neurologist
- James T. Slater, American songwriter

== See also ==
- Jim Slater (disambiguation)
- James Salter (1925–2015), American novelist and short-story writer
