= Jessie Slater =

English radiologist (1879–1961)

Jessie Mabel Wilkins Slater (24 February 1879 – 25 December 1961) was an English nuclear physicist who worked as a radiologist at a military hospital in World War I and served as the first woman mayor of Hampstead.

== Life ==
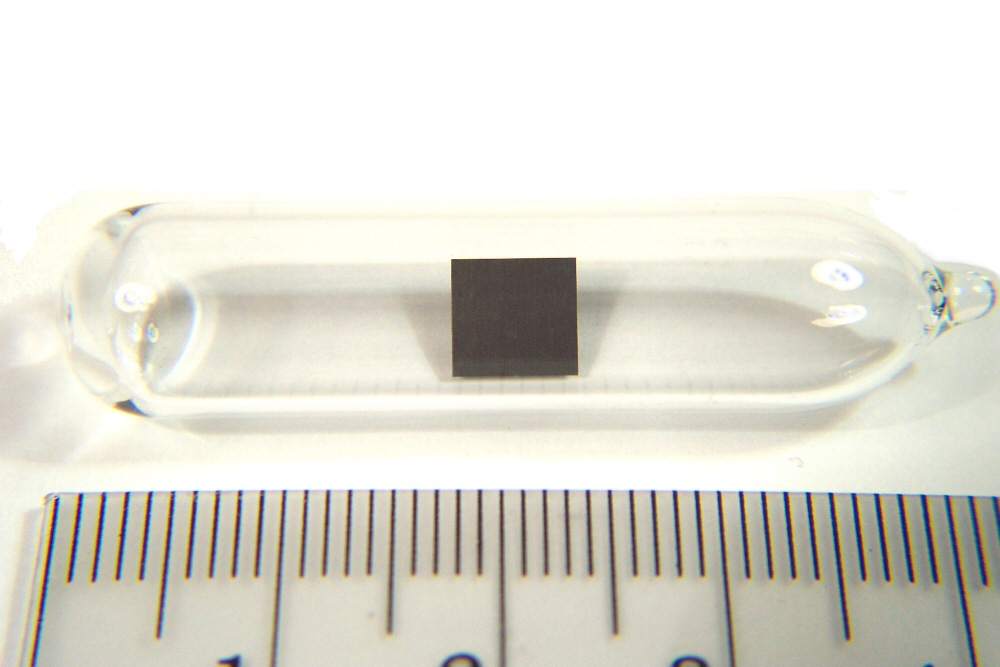
Thorium sample in a glass ampoule, the subject of Slater's research.

Slater was born in Hampstead on 24 February 1879 to John Slater and his wife Mary, née Wilkins. She had two sisters, including geologist Ida Slater.

She studied at Newnham College, Cambridge from 1899 to 1903, and then received a Bathurst studentship to continue her studies in 1903–5. She worked on thorium at the Cavendish Laboratory under J. J. Thomson. She established that the decay products of thorium volatised at different temperatures, and showed that thorium and radium emanations emitted delta rays.

She received her BSc in chemistry from the University of London in 1902, as Cambridge was not awarding degrees to women at the time, and was one of the first women to receive a doctorate in science at the University of London in 1906.

After teaching at Cheltenham Ladies' College from 1909 to 1913, she returned to Newnham as a lecturer in physic and chemistry from 1914 to 1926.

During World War I she worked as a nurse, from 1915 to 1917, at Wordsworth Grove V.AD. Hospital in Cambridge. Then, from March to September 1918, she worked as a Physicist and Assistant Radiographer, at the Military Hospital V.R. 76, also known as "Hôpital Militaire Johnstone-Reckitt", in Ris-Orangis, France.

In June 1926, she married Harold Baily. She served on school care committees and on the Council of Unitarian and Free Christian Churches. She served two terms as mayor of Hampstead in 1930–1 and 1931–2.

She died on 25 December 1961.

== Publications ==
- Slater, J.M.W. (1905). "LIX. On the excited activity of thorium". The London, Edinburgh, and Dublin Philosophical Magazine and Journal of Science. 9 (53): 628–644. doi:10.1080/14786440509463314. ISSN 1941-5982.
- Slater, J.M.W. (1905). "LIII. On the emission of negative electricity by radium and thorium emanations". The London, Edinburgh, and Dublin Philosophical Magazine and Journal of Science. 10 (58): 460–466. doi:10.1080/14786440509463393. ISSN 1941-5982.
