= Joseph E. Slater =

American economist

Joseph E. Slater (1922–2002), was an economist and intellectual entrepreneur who played a key role in the "de-Nazification" of Germany after World War II. He was president of the Aspen Institute and authored the original blueprint for the Peace Corps.

He was born in Salt Lake City in 1922.

== German reconstruction ==
Until 1948, Slater served as the deputy United States secretary to the council when he moved to the policy planning staff at the State Department to help form the United Nations. In 1949, Slater was named Secretary General of the Allied High Commission in Germany and three years later moved to Paris where he served as executive secretary in the office of the United States representatives to NATO and the Organisation for European Economic Co-operation, set up under the Marshall Plan.

== Civil society ==
Slater returned from Europe in the 1950s and served as the chief economist for Creole Petroleum, a subsidiary of Standard Oil Company. While at Creole Petroleum, Slater founded and served as the executive director of Fundación Creole, the philanthropic arm of the corporation. In 1957 Slater joined the international affairs program of the Ford Foundation. At the Ford Foundation he played a key role in lobbying the US to recognize China. During his time at the Ford Foundation, Slater was named the Secretary of President Eisenhower's Commission on Foreign Assistance, or the Draper Committee. With the election of John F. Kennedy he was named deputy assistant secretary of state for educational and cultural affairs where he wrote the blueprint for the Peace Corps.

== Aspen Institute ==
Slater was president and chief executive of the Aspen Institute for 17 years, starting in 1969.

== Death ==
Slater died in 2002 from Parkinson's disease.
