= Slater Menswear =

Scottish retail menswear chain store

- Type: Private
- Industry: Retail
- Genre: Clothing store
- Founded: 1904
- Founder: Samuel Slater
- Headquarters: Glasgow, Scotland,
- Number of locations: 27
- Key people: Paul Slater (Managing Director)
- Products: Menswear
- Number of employees: 800 (2018)
- Website: https://www.slaters.co.uk/

Slater Menswear, also referred to as Slaters, is a Scottish menswear retailer with 27 stores operating across England, Wales and Scotland. It is family-run and was founded in 1904 in Glasgow by Samuel Slater as a tailor's shop. His son Ralph diversified the business into retail in 1973. Its current managing director is his grandson Paul.

The first-ever store was opened on Howard Street in Glasgow, and this is still the brand's biggest store, as well as being home to their head office; this store was named as the world's largest single menswear store by the Guinness World Records.

== History ==
The business was founded in 1904 by Samuel Slater originally as a tailor's shop in Glasgow. His children joined the business and helped to grow the company. One of his sons, Ralph, established the retail business in 1973 following a fire which nearly closed the company. The first store opened on Howard Street. Further stores opened in Ayr and Manchester in the 1980s with a rapid expansion in the 1990s resulting in a total of 23 stores.

As of 2023, Slater Menswear has a total of 27 stores across Great Britain. The latest being opened in York, Yorkshire in 2023. Its flagship store in Glasgow was listed by the Guinness World Records as the largest single menswear shop in the world.

== Stores ==
Slater Menswear stores can be found in the following locations:

- England: Basingstoke, Birmingham, Bolton, Bristol, Bromley, Canterbury, Chelmsford, Cheltenham, Hull, Leeds, Liverpool, Manchester, Newcastle, Norwich, Nottingham, Preston, Reading, York
- Scotland: Aberdeen, Ayr, Dundee, Edinburgh, Glasgow, Inverness, Stirling
- Wales: Cardiff, Swansea
