= Gordon Slater =

Gordon Slater may refer to:

- Gordon Slater (carillonneur) (born 1950), Canadian carillonneur, bassoonist, conductor and organist
- Gordon Slater (rugby union) (born 1971), former rugby player from New Zealand
- Gordon Archbold Slater (1896–1979), English cathedral organist
