= Jim Slater (footballer) =

Australian rules footballer

Personal information
- Full name: James Nicholas Slater
- Born: 21 February 1884; Pine Hill, Queensland
- Died: 30 July 1970 (aged 86); Camberwell, Victoria
- Original team: Milawa

Playing career^{1}
Years	Club	Games (Goals)
1905	Carlton	4 (0)
- ^{1} Playing statistics correct to the end of 1905.

James Nicholas Slater (21 February 1884 – 30 July 1970) was an Australian rules footballer who played with Carlton in the Victorian Football League (VFL).

Slater was recruited to Carlton from Milawa FC in the Ovens & King Football League.

Slater made his debut against Geelong at Princes Park in round five, 1905.

Slater later returned to play with Milawa and played in their losing 1907 Ovens & King Football League grand final side.

Slater, later played for Moyhu, playing in their 1910 and 1911 Ovens & King Football League premierships.
