= Catherine Raisin =

British geologist (1855–1945)

Catherine Alice Raisin
- Born: 24 April 1855; Camden New Town
- Died: 13 July 1945 (aged 90); Cheltenham
- Education: University College London
- Scientific career
- Workplaces: Bedford College

Catherine Alice Raisin (24 April 1855 – 13 July 1945) was one of the most important early female geologists in Britain. Her research was primarily in the field of microscope petrology and mineralogy. She was the head of the geology department at Bedford College for Women in London for 30 years, and strove for women's equality in education. She was also the head of the botany department at the Bedford College for Women.

== Early life and education ==
Catherine Raisin was born on 24 April 1855, in Camden, New Town, London, England. She was the youngest child and only daughter of Daniel Francis Raisin and Sarah Catherine Woodgate. Catherine had three older brothers, and her mother was 45 years old when she was born. Her father was employed at the Inner Temple as a pannierman. Raisin was educated at the North London Collegiate School, a private school for girls. From an early age, Catherine had an enthusiasm for geology, an obligation she owed to Sir Charles Lyell 'whose Principles of Geology was one of the most punctual books to stir my energy'. When she was 18 years old, she started attending classes at University College London, where she first studied geology, then mineralogy.

In 1877, Raisin attained a special certificate in botany, but could not start a degree until they were opened to women in 1878. In 1879, after passing the Intermediate Science examination she selected geology, botany and zoology. There she studied under Professor T.G. Bonney, while also attending Thomas Huxley's lectures at the Royal School of Mines. She was the first woman to study geology at University College, London. In 1884, she obtained her B.Sc. honors in both geology and zoology as top University College graduate.^{[2]} Following her graduation, she worked on a voluntary basis as a research assistant to Professor T.G. Bonney. In 1893, at the age of 38, Raisin was the first woman to receive the "Lyell Fund" award from the Geological Society of London for her research on metamorphism. Bonney needed to accept the honor for her benefit, since the Geological Society of London did not permit women to go to its gatherings at the time. In 1898, Raisin obtained her D.Sc from the University of London; she was the second female geologist to achieve this accolade.

== Career ==
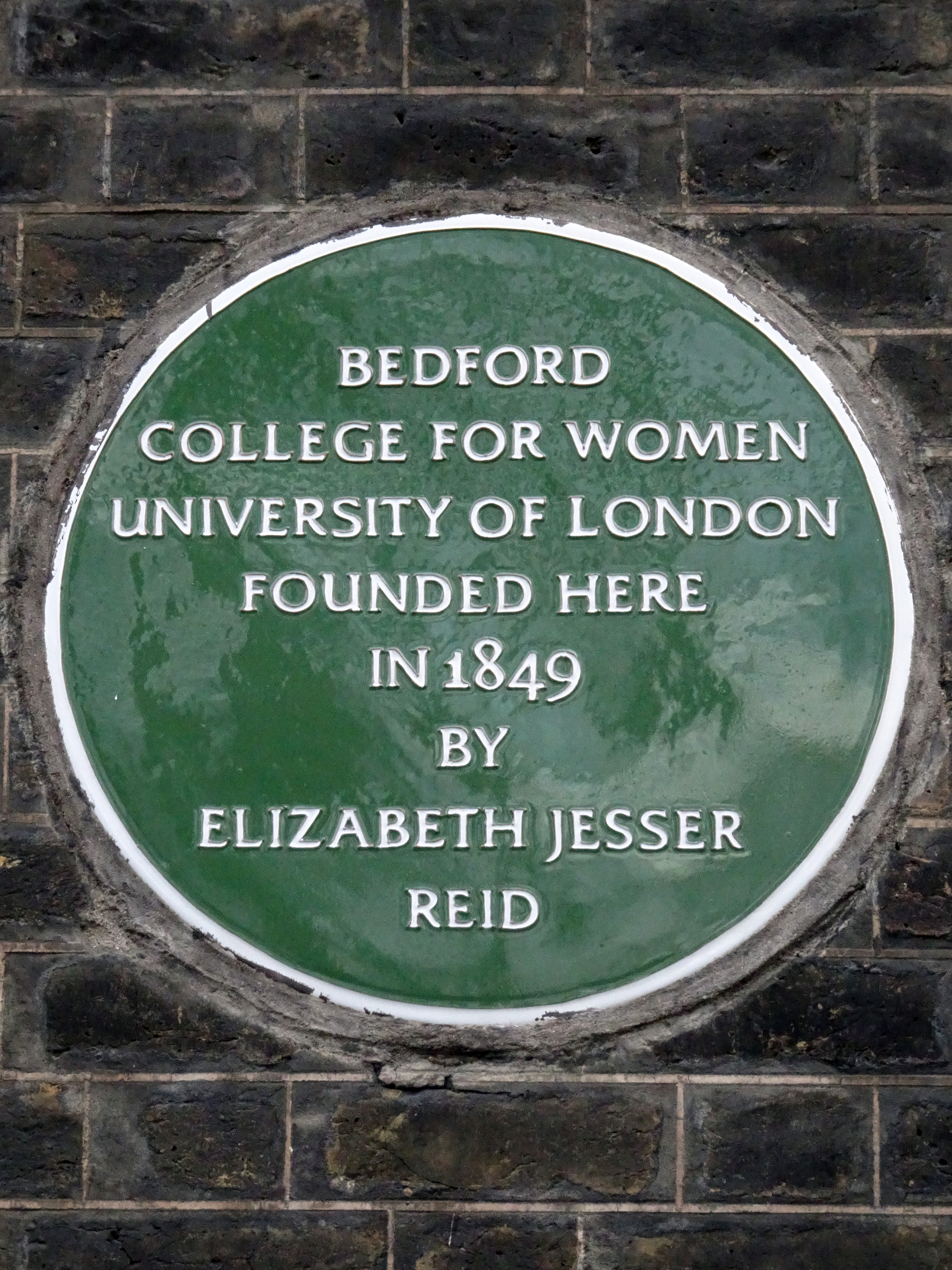
Bedford College for Women plaque commemorating its opening in 1849

Catherine Raisin spent her entire academic career at Bedford College, where in 1886, she became a demonstrator of botany. She was also the first full-time head of the geology department from 1890 to 1920, and helped form a separate geography department while still teaching a large amount of geology classes. She was also head of the botany department from 1891 to 1908 and head of the geography department from 1916 to 1920. Raisin accepted an offer of the post of Vice Principal of the college in 1898, but resigned in 1901 due to the high work load. The following year Raisin was elected a fellow of University College. She was also a member of the Geologists' Association for 67 years, one of the longest serving members.

The main focus of Raisin's research was in the study of rocks using microscope petrology and mineralogy, topics in which she published 24 papers between 1887 and 1905, counting community oriented works with Bonney. The larger part of these papers were distributed in three Journals: Quarterly Journal of the Geological Society; Geological Magazine; and the Proceedings of the Geologists' Association. In particular she studied chert, serpentines, and spilites. In 1887, her first paper was read to the Geological Society of London by T.G. Bonney, since women were not allowed to present papers back then. She was seen as a leading expert on metamorphic facies; the characteristic mineral assemblages form under similar temperatures and pressures. She also worked on the microcrystalline formation of chert in Jurassic-era and published her findings in her well-known paper Proceedings of the Geologists' Association in 1903.

Raisin became a fellow of the Linnean Society of London in 1906 and in 1919, after the society changed its rules to allow women, also became a fellow of the Geological Society of London at age 64.

== Career research ==
Throughout her research, Catherine Raisin has worked on various projects pertaining to petrology and mineralogy. Upon her research, she focused on:

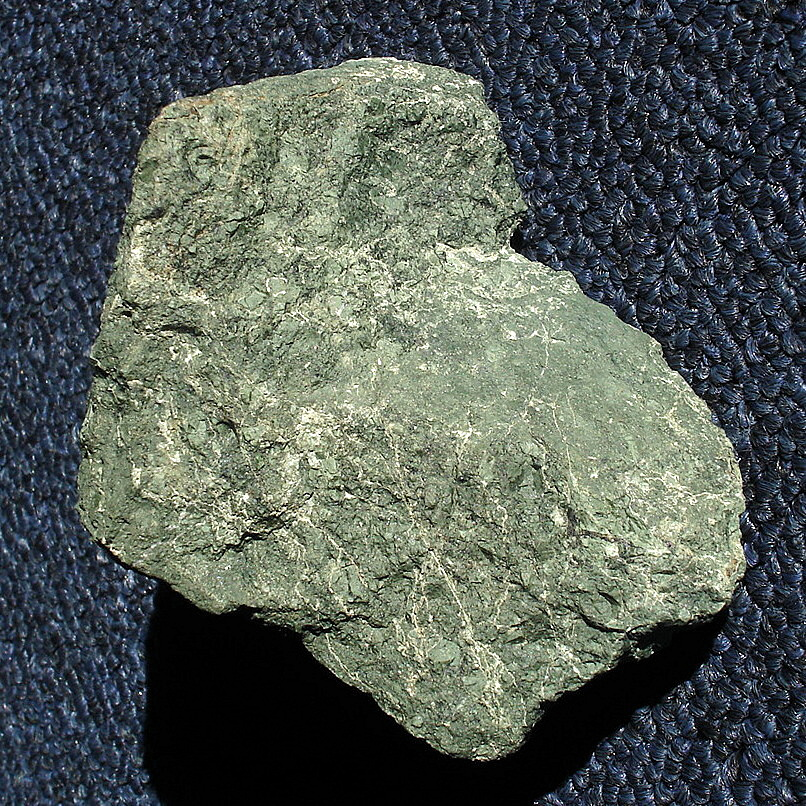
10 to 14cm wide sample of Serpentinite found in the Golden Gate National Recreation Area

- The study of rocks in the Ardennes and region of Wales, analyzing the stratigraphy of rocks from the geological time scale of the Cambrian and Devonian periods. Raisin focused on rock formations as a result of slaty cleavage and over-thrust faults and foldings
- Research on the analysis of metamorphism pertaining to rocks in South Devon, England which resulted in findings of two distinct rock compositions (slaty cleavage and metamorphism) between South Devon and the adjacent regions
- The study of the microstructure and crystallization of chert found in England and the United Kingdom. Raisin focused on the microscopic composition of chert using the composition as an index fossil to determine whether chert originated during or after the Jurassic period
- Research and analysis of serpentinite, formerly serpentine in Anglesey, Wales

== Women's equality ==
Catherine Raisin served as a role model for research, teaching and administration throughout the last decade of the nineteenth century and the first two decades of the twentieth. Over her lifetime, Catherine Raisin has become a leading role as a female leader in the department of geology in England. She became the first woman to study geology at the University College of London in 1875. Furthering her career, she worked at Bedford College in England to become the first female professor in the Science Department, and furthermore, the first woman to lead as the head of the Geology Department in 1890. As of 1898, Raisin was the first woman to become a vice principal of Bedford College, and later in her studies, she became the second woman at the University of London to receive a Doctoral degree in science with honours.

Over the course of her career Raisin fought for equality in education, specifically for the right of female students to study at university and become researchers or lecturers. In 1880, she founded the Somerville Club, a women's discussion group which would grow to over 1000 members by 1887; she was the honorary secretary and later on the chairman of the club. At Bedford College she sometimes paid wages herself and set up various funds and awards to encourage students to do well. She was a pioneer in providing the opportunity for women to receive a higher education. She also provided employment opportunities for other women. In 1911 Ira Slater worked with her as a demonstrator in the geography department of Bedford College. After retiring, Raisin again worked with women's groups.

She was a testament to the work and research a woman could accomplish in a male-dominated profession.

== Awards and achievements ==
Catherine Raisin accomplished many achievements over her lifetime, especially pertaining to women's equality in geology.

She achieved and was awarded in:

- First woman to study geology at the University College of London, 1875
- First woman to lead as Head of Geology department at the Bedford College, 1890
- First woman awarded the Lyell Fund from the Geological Society of London, 1893
- Awarded Doctorate of Science with Honours in Geology and Zoology from London University, 1898
- First woman to be appointed Morton Sumner lecture and curator, 1907
- Became the ninth woman to become a Fellow of the Geological Society, 1919
- Appointed an examiner for the special intermediate exam for the University of London in geology, 1920

== Publications ==
Between 1887 and 1905, Catherine Raisin published twenty-four research papers, including her collaborative work with Bonney. Catherine Raisin geological research was mainly in microscopic petrology and mineralogy. Most of Catherine Raisin papers were published by; Quarterly Journal of the Geological Society, Geological Magazine, and the Proceedings of the Geologists' Association. One of her most acclaimed paper was Proceedings of the Geologists' Association in 1903. Many of her peers praised her careful field observation and her thorough petrological microscope laboratory work.

The Quarterly Journal of The Geological Society:

- "Notes On The Metamorphic Rocks of South Devon," in The Quarterly Journal of The Geological Society, January 1887, V. 43, pp. 715–733
- "On Some Nodular Felstones of The Lleyn," in The Quarterly Journal of The Geological Society, Jan 1889, V. 45, pp. 247–269
- "On The Lower Limit of The Cambrian Series in NW Caernarvonshire," in The Quarterly Journal of The Geological Society, February 1891, V. 47, pp. 329–342
- "Variolite of The Lleyn, and Associated Volcanic Rocks," in The Quarterly Journal of The Geological Society, January 1893, V. 49, pp. 145–165
- "On the Nature and Origin of the Rauenthal Serpentine," in The Quarterly Journal of The Geological Society, 1897, V. 53, pp. 296-268
- "The Microscopic Structure of the Minerals Forming Serpentine, and Their Relation to its History," T.G. Bonney and Catherine Raisin, in The Quarterly Journal of The Geological Society, 1905, V. 6.1, pp. 690–715
- "Petrological Notes on Rocks From Southern Abyssinia," in The Quarterly Journal of The Geological Society, 1903, V. 59, pp. 292–306
- "On Certain Altered Rocks From Near Bastogne, and Their Relations to Others in the District," in The Quarterly Journal of The Geological Society, 1901, V. 57, pp. 55–72

Geological Magazines:

- "IV. On The So-called Spilites of Jersey," T. G. Bonney and Catherine Raisin, in Geological Magazine, February 1893, V. 10, pp. 59–64
- "IV. The So-called Serpentines of The Lleyn," in Geological Magazine, 1892, pp. 408–413
- "On a Horneblende - Picrite From the Zmutthal (Canton Valais), in Geological Magazine, 1897, V. 4.5, pp. 202-205
- "Notes on the Geology of Perim Island," in Geological Magazine, 1902, pp. 206–210

Other:

- "On Rocks and Minerals Collected by Mr. WM Conway in The Karakoram Himalayas," in Proceedings of the Royal Society of London, T.G. Bonney and Catherine Raisin, 1894, V. 1, pp. 468–487
- "The Formation of Chert and its Micro-Structures in Some Jurassic Strata," in Proceedings of the Geologists' Association, 1903, V. 18.2

== Later life and death ==
Raisin retired in 1920 when she was 65. She did not marry.

All her life she was an enthusiastic non-smoker and was not reluctant to tell individuals of her dismay when they 'lit up' in theaters, prepares and transports. She lived at Ash Priors Nursing Home and continued to support various women's groups. Catherine Raisin died on 13 July 1945 at the age of 90 from cancer in Cheltenham, England. She was buried on 17 July 1945.
