= Rebeccah Slater =

British neuroscientist and academic

- Education: Imperial College London (BSc), University College London (MSc, PhD)
- Scientific career
- Fields: Paediatric neuroscience, paediatric pain
- Workplaces: University of Oxford
- Thesis: Cortical Pain Processing in the Infant Brain (2007)
- Doctoral advisor: Maria Fitzgerald
- Website: www.paediatrics.ox.ac.uk/team/rebeccah-slater

Rebeccah Slater is a British neuroscientist and academic. She is professor of paediatric neuroscience and a senior Wellcome Trust research fellow at the University of Oxford. She is also a professorial fellow in Neuroscience at St John's College.

Her research focuses on infant pain, using non-invasive neuroimaging techniques to improve understanding and measurement of pain in preterm (premature) and term infants. In this regard, she has established the Paediatric Neuroimaging Group (c. 2013), which aims ultimately to improve neonatal care through developing quantitative neuroimaging measures of pain in infants and translation to clinical practice.

== Career ==
Slater established the Paediatric Neuroimaging Group at the University of Oxford in 2013 as an Associate Professor of Paediatric Neuroimaging, which she continues to lead. She was awarded a Title of Distinction by Oxford University in 2018 to become a Professor of Paediatric Neuroscience. She is also a Senior Wellcome Trust Research Fellow, was awarded a Statutory Chair in Paediatric Neuroimaging in 2019, and has been a Professorial Fellow at St John's College since 2019.

== Research ==
Slater's work constituted the first evidence for specific cortical pain response in premature infants from 25 weeks old. She measures the blood flow changes in the brain during clinically required blood tests using near-infrared spectroscopy (NIRS) and compares it to the blood flow during non-painful tactile stimulation. She was the first to directly measure pain-specific neural activity in infants using electroencephalography (EEG), during clinically required blood tests. This EEG measure was then developed by Slater and her research group into a general EEG template for measuring pain response in infants - a significant step towards using objective neuroimaging tools to evaluate pain experience in infants - which has been used to validate pain relief interventions for infants during clinical procedures. She is an advocate for neuroimaging tools for objective measurement of infant pain, and has demonstrated that brain activity could be more sensitive to pain responses in infants than other common assessment tools.

As well as work directly within her research group, she is a collaborator on the developing Human Connectome Project (dHCP), a large-scale multi-centre project to develop the first developmental map of human brain connectivity between 20–44 weeks of age, that will include and link imaging, clinical, behavioural and genetic information. She has also been on the scientific organising committee for the International Symposium on Paediatric Pain.

She is part of a collaboration to develop wearable magnetoencephalography (MEG) scanners for children, described by Physics World as one of the Top 10 Breakthroughs of the Year for 2019.

One research study published in April 2015 involved infants, accompanied by their parents, being gently poked with a rod-like device while being scanned by MRIs to measure and understand infant pain. This research suggested that "not only do babies experience pain but they may be more sensitive to it than adults" stated Slater.

== Public engagement and media ==
Slater is considerably involved in public engagement and media communication. With her research group, she has produced several videos for a public audience to communicate research in infant pain and neuroimaging as well as developing artwork and games in collaboration with artists, and her group is very active at public engagement events and science festivals such as the Cheltenham Science Festival.

She has appeared on radio and podcasts to talk about measurement and understanding of infant pain, including Radio 4 pieces "From agony to analgesia", Case Notes with Dr Mark Porter, as well as the BBC World Service: Health Check, and The Naked Scientists podcast "Do Newborn Babies Feel Pain?" She has also appeared on BBC News, and in articles by the BBC, The Guardian, and Scientific American to communicate advances in measuring and managing infant pain.
