= Joseph Slater Jr. =

British painter (1782–1837)

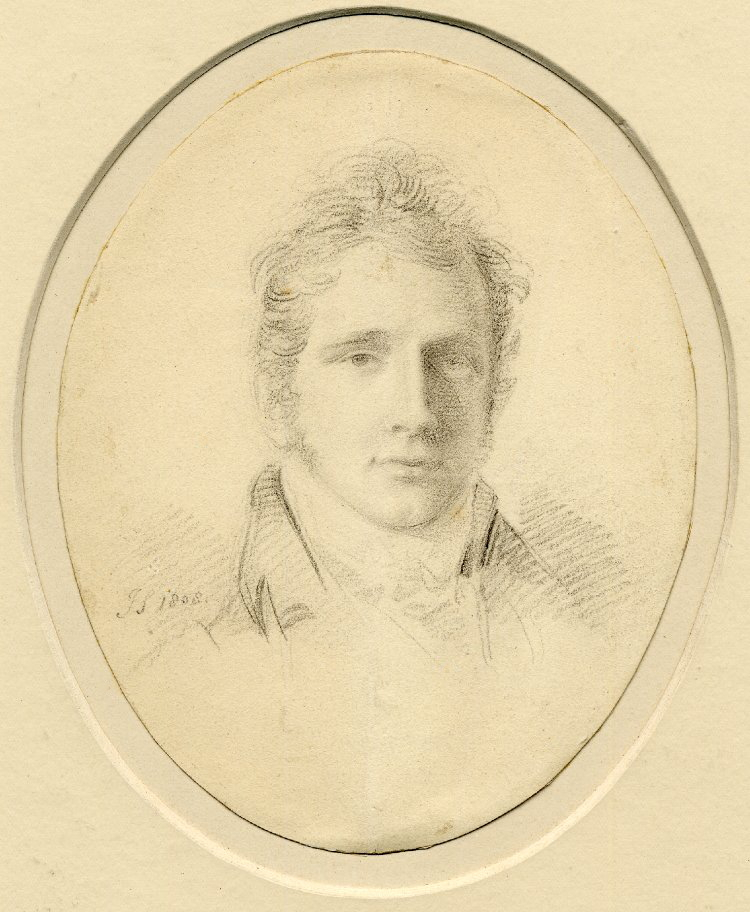
Joseph Slater (Possible self-portrait), 1808

Joseph Slater (17 June 1782 – 25 February 1837) was a British portrait painter and draughtsman.

== Life ==
Born in Wandsworth, London, Joseph Slater was a son of Joseph Slater of Bromley (1750–1805), portraitist and decorator and Ann (born Wane).

Slater worked as a portraitist in London, exhibiting his first picture at the Royal Academy in 1803, where his portraits were exhibited regularly between 1806 and 1833. Since 1813 he was a portraitist at the Grillion's Club in London. Many of Joseph Slater's portraits were published as lithographs by his brother Isaac Wane Slater. They both worked since 1805 in the John Bacon's studio at 17 Newman Street. Later the brothers moved down in their own studio with a shop at 70 Newman Street.

Slater worked predominantly in pencil, crayons and watercolor. He was very prolific: his heritage counts about two hundred portraits. He died in Brighton aged 55 years old.

== Family ==
Two brothers of Joseph Slater were also artists: Isaac Wane Slater (1784–1846), miniature painter and line engraver and John Slater (1786–1836), miniature, portrait and flower painter. His other brother Michael Atwell Slater (died 1842) was a Royal Navy officer, a captain, a member of The Royal Geographical Society and an explorer of the coasts of England and Scotland.

== Sources ==
- Binyon, Laurence (1907). Catalogue of drawings by British artists and artists of foreign origin working in Great Britain, preserved at the Department of prints and drawings in the British Museum. Vol. IV. London: British Museum. p. 104.
