= John Slater (cricketer) =

English cricketer

John Slater (born May 1795) was an English professional cricketer who played from 1825 to 1829. He was mainly associated with Sussex and made seven known appearances.
