= Robert W. Slater =

Canadian environmental policy leader

Bob Slater CM
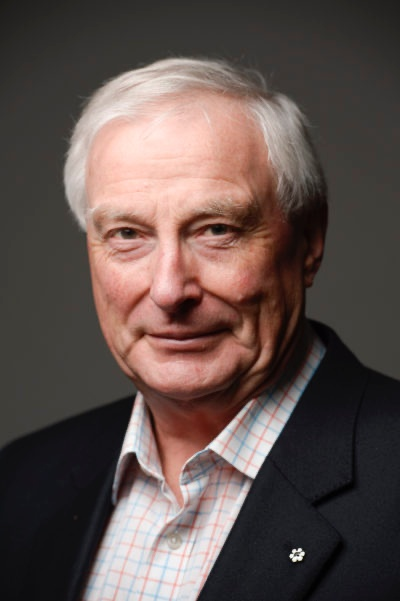
- Slater in 2017
- Education: PhD
- Alma mater: Imperial College
- Known for: Environmental policy
- Honours: Member Order of Canada

Robert W. Slater CM is a former Senior Assistant Deputy Minister at Environment and Climate Change Canada and an Adjunct Professor at Carleton University, Canada.

== Education ==
Bob Slater received his BSc (1963) and PhD (1967) from Imperial College, London UK.

== Career ==
Slater started his career in the private sector and joined Environment Canada in 1971. He became Assistant Deputy Minister in 1985 and Senior Assistant Deputy Minister in 1997. During his public service career, he was instrumental in establishing the National Roundtable on the Environment and the Economy, the International Institute for Sustainable Development, and the UNU Institute for Water, Environment and Health. He played a lead role in the renegotiation of the Great Lakes Water Quality Agreement, the Acid Rain Agreements with provincial governments, the Canada-US Accord on Air Quality, and the Canadian Green Plan.

He led preparations for Canada’s role in the UN Conference on the Environment (“Earth Summit”) in Rio de Janeiro in 1992. He was responsible for legislative initiatives leading to the Canadian Environmental Protect Act (CEPA) and the Species at Risk Act (SARA), and led the development of regulations limiting lead in gasoline and bringing auto emissions standards in line with those in USA. He chaired the International Joint Commission’s Great Lakes Water Quality Board from 1976 to 1982.

After his retirement from the Government of Canada, he presided an independent consulting firm and was elected Adjunct Professor at Carleton University where he served as Executive Director of the Regulatory Governance Initiative at the School Public Policy and Administration. He also chaired an expert panel at the Council of Canadian Academies, served as a member of the National Roundtable on the Environment and the Economy and served on the board of the Ottawa Riverkeeper.

== Select honours ==
- Member of the Order of Canada (2010), for his “pivotal role in shaping Canada's environmental policy.”
- Doctor of Laws, honoris causa, Carleton University (2019), for “spearheading initiatives for the protection of the air and water and inspiring a new generation of Canadians to environmental leadership.”
- Lifetime Achievement Award, Canadian Science Policy Conference (2020).
