= Harry Slater =

Harry Slater may refer to:

- Harry Slater (politician) (1863–1936), Canadian politician
- Harry Slater (rugby), rugby union and rugby league footballer who played in the 1900s and 1910s
- Harry Slater (EastEnders), a character on the British soap opera EastEnders

== See also ==
- Henry Slater (disambiguation)
