= Henry Slater (cricketer, born 1839) =

English cricketer

Personal information
- Full name: Henry John Slater
- Born: 15 February 1839; Newark, Nottinghamshire, England
- Died: 4 November 1905 (aged 66); Newark, Nottinghamshire, England
- Batting: Unknown

Career statistics
Competition	First-class
Matches	1
Runs scored	8
Batting average	–
100s/50s	–/–
Top score	8*
Catches/stumpings	–/–
- Source: Cricinfo, 8 September 2019

Henry John Slater (15 February 1839 – 4 November 1905) was an English first-class cricketer.

Slater was born in February 1839 at Newark, Nottinghamshire. He played minor matches for Newark and Grantham, before making a single appearance in first-class cricket for the North against Surrey at The Oval in 1860, batting once in the North's first-innings and making an unbeaten 8 runs. He died at Newark in November 1905.
