= Ida Slater =

- Born: Ida Lilian Slater; 30 June 1881; Hampstead, London, England
- Died: 7 August 1969 (aged 88); Hillingdon
- Occupation: Geologist

Ida Lilian Slater (1881–1969) was a British geologist who made important contributions to the study of conulariids. She was jointly awarded the Daniel Pidgeon Fund with Helen Drew (funding awarded in 1907 and 1906 respectively) to undertake field work investigating the Palaeozoic rocks of Wales.

== Early life ==
Ida was born into a wealthy family in Hampstead, London on 30 June 1881. She was one of four children of Mary Emily Wilkins and John Slater, a fellow of the Royal Institute of British Architects. One of her siblings was the nuclear physicist Jessie Slater (1879 – 1961).

Slater went to the all-girls South Hampstead High School. Slater and Helen Drew arrived at Newnham College, Cambridge in 1900 to study geology as part of their degrees. Prior to becoming a geologist, Slater also explored geomorphology and stratigraphy. Slater was secretary of the Sedgwick Club, Cambridge in 1903. Part of her development as a geologist was gained at the Club where she was a member from 6 May 1902 until 1905, and was their honorary secretary from mid-1903 until 9 February 1904. During the later years of her degree, she occasionally attended meetings as a visitor until her final recorded attendance on 27 February 1906 (Sedgwick Club notebooks, Archives of the University of Cambridge, Sedgwick Museum of Earth Sciences). After her degree she won a Harkness Scholarship and published her monograph on conulariids in 1907.

== Career ==
Slater collaborated with Gertrude Elles on the stratigraphy of the Lower Palaeozoic of Wales, publishing in 1906 (Elles and Slater 1906). She published her monograph on conulariids in 2007, and in 1910 published the results of her research into the Palaeozoic of Wales jointly with Helen Drew.

After undertaking research, she was appointed a demonstrator for Catherine Raisin, employed to help run the department and laboratories, at the new laboratory rooms for geology and botany (established 1897) at Bedford College (London) in 1910. She held that post for two years.

== Family life ==
Slater married William Lees, a Kensington solicitor, in 1912 at Hampstead. Slater ceased working completely after marrying him.

== Publications ==
- Drew, H. and Slater, I.L. 1910. Notes on the geology of the district of Llansawel, Carmarthenshire.
- Elles, G.L. and Slater, I.L. 1906. The highest Silurian rocks of the Ludlow district. Quarterly Journal of the Geological Society of London, 62, 195–221.
- Slater, Ida L. 1907. A monograph of British Conulariae. Monograph of the Palaeontographical Society. 40p., 5 leaves of plates: ill.; 28 cm.
