= J. D. Slater =

American pornographic film actor, director, and music composer

- Born: 1954 or 1955 (age 70–71)
- Occupations: actor, director, composer
- Employer: Raging Stallion Studios
- Known for: Gay pornography; music composition
- Awards: GayVN Hall of Fame, Grabby Awards Wall of Fame

J. D. Slater is an American gay pornography actor, director, and music composer from San Francisco who co-founded Raging Stallion Studios (RSS) with Chris Ward in 1999.

== Awards and nominations ==
- 2000 Grabby Awards – Best Video, nomination: All Sex – SexPack 2: A Kinky Twist (directors: Chris Ward and J. D. Slater)
- 2003 GayVN Awards Hall of Fame
- 2003 Grabby Awards Wall of Fame
- 2004 HX Magazine, winner: Gorge
- 2004 GayVN Awards – Best Soundtrack, nomination: A Porn Star is Born
- 2004 GayVN Awards – Best Soundtrack, nomination: Gorge
- 2004 GayVN Awards – Best Leather Video, nomination: Your Masters
- 2006 GayVN Awards – Best Music, nomination: Arabesque
- 2008 GayVN Awards – Best Music, nomination: Nekked Grunts
- 2008, 14th Annual Hard Choice Awards, nomination: Erotikus
- 2009 GayVN Awards – Best Bear, nomination: Centurion Muscle 5: Maximus (director: J. D. Slater)
- 2009 GayVN Awards – Best Music, nomination: Nekked
- 2009 GayVN Awards – Best Music, nomination: To The Last Man
