= Billy Slater (footballer) =

English footballer

William Slater (1858 – after 1883) was an English footballer who played as a centre forward for Small Heath Alliance in the 1880s.

The club entered the FA Cup for the first time in 1881–82, and were drawn to play at home to Derby Town. The game was played on 17 October 1881 at Coventry Road. Slater's opening goal in a 4–1 win was the first goal scored by Small Heath Alliance, later to become Birmingham City, in national competitive football. He made five appearances in the FA Cup, scoring four goals, but left the club long before they started playing organised league football.

Slater was born in Birmingham.
