= Edward Slater =

Australian biochemist

Edward Slater FRS FAA
- photo by Piet Borst
- Born: 16 January 1917; Melbourne, Australia
- Died: 26 March 2016 (aged 99); Painswick, UK
- Education: University of Melbourne BSc, MSc; University of Cambridge PhD, ScD
- Awards: FRS (1975); Order of the Netherlands Lion (1984)
- Scientific career
- Fields: bioenergetics
- Workplaces: University of Amsterdam
- Doctoral advisor: David Keilin
- Notable students: Piet Borst

Edward Charles Slater FRS FAA (16 January 1917 – 26 March 2016), also known as Bill Slater, was an Australian biochemist who spent most of his career at the University of Amsterdam.

== Early life and education ==
Slater was raised in Australia. He received a training in biochemistry at the Ormond College of the University of Melbourne. In 1946, he moved to Cambridge, where he earned his PhD under the supervision of David Keilin.

== Career ==
In 1955, Slater joined the medical faculty of the University of Amsterdam, where he remained until retiring in 1985. He is recognised for his contributions to the development of Dutch biochemistry.

Slater managed the journal Biochimica et Biophysica Acta, turning it into one of the most influential publications in the field. He wrote a history of the journal, Biochimica et biophysica acta: the story of a biochemical journal, which was published in 1986.

He served as the president of the International Union of Biochemistry and Molecular Biology from 1988 until 1991.

== Research ==
Slater made contributions to the identification and understanding of the physiological role of the components of the respiratory chain, especially of the various cytochrome b complexes, iron–sulfur proteins and other iron-containing substances. He showed that the binding of certain inhibitors of oxidative phosphorylation acting at different sites (antimycin on electron transport, oligomycin on the coupling between electron transport and oxidative phosphorylation, and aurovertin in the ATP-synthesising enzyme) can be positively cooperative, and that the degree of cooperativity depends on the state of the mitochondrial membrane. He also demonstrated negative cooperative binding of a ligand to an enzyme (nicotinamide adenine dinucleotide to glyceraldehyde phosphate dehydrogenase), which has implications for the mechanisms of cooperative binding generally.

== Awards and honours ==
In 1964, Slater became a member of the Royal Netherlands Academy of Arts and Sciences. He was elected a Fellow of the Royal Society (FRS) in 1975.

In 1984, he was appointed a Knight in the Order of the Netherlands Lion, and in 1985 he was elected a Corresponding Fellow of the Australian Academy of Science.

He was awarded honorary degrees by the University of Southampton (1993) and the University of Bari (1998).
