= Casey Jordan =

American fitness professional and adult film actor (1968–2018)

- Born: Kyle Neven; February 10, 1968; Salt Lake City, Utah, U.S.
- Died: October 9, 2018 (aged 50); West Hollywood, California, U.S.
- Other names: Kyle (Buttonpusher); Neven
- Education: University of Tennessee
- Occupations: Personal trainer; Model; Actor; Songwriter
- Years active: 1984–2018
- Agent: Falcon Studios

Kyle Neven (February 10, 1968 – October 9, 2018), widely known by his adult entertainment pseudonym Casey Jordan, was an American fitness pioneer, television personality, personal trainer, professional model, and adult film performer.

An elite gymnast and diver from childhood, Neven became a fixture of the early mainstream aerobic fitness boom in the 1980s, appearing on pioneering television fitness programs and developing proprietary workout regimens. Concurrently, he maintained a high-profile modeling and adult cinema career spanning three decades—the 1980s, 1990s, and 2000s—where he became famous for his striking looks and highly defined, muscular physique. He dedicated his later life to high-performance personal training in West Hollywood and political activism.

== Early life ==
Neven was born in Salt Lake City, Utah, and raised primarily in Gainesville, Florida. He began training as a competitive athlete at the age of five, focusing on gymnastics and springboard diving.

By age 16, his physical conditioning caught the attention of fitness television producers. He was cast as an original on-camera ensemble member of Body Electric, the first nationally televised aerobic fitness program in the United States, which brought rhythmic conditioning into mainstream American households. He later relocated to Tennessee, studying nutrition and exercise physiology at the University of Tennessee, Knoxville.

== Career ==
=== Mainstream Fitness ===
In the late 1980s and early 1990s, Neven became a central figure in the commercial aerobics movement. He served as one of the original instructors for the international launch of Step Reebok, leading classes during the format's infancy when it was still known conceptually as "Bench Class".

After moving to Los Angeles, he taught highly popular step aerobics classes at the iconic Sports Connection gym in West Hollywood throughout the early to mid-1990s. Neven subsequently founded Neven Fitness, through which he personal-trained corporate executives and top-tier professional athletes from major sports organizations, including New York Yankees MLB, Cleveland Browns NFL, Florida Gators NCAA, and Sydney Swans AFL.

=== Fitness ===
Neven developed Gyromania, a three-dimensional gyrokinetic cardiovascular and body-sculpting group exercise class that integrated core mechanics with specialized equipment. To complement the class, he invented and patented The Power Hoop, a weighted hula-hoop designed for advanced core muscle stimulation and lean mass development.

=== Modeling and Adult Film ===
Throughout the 1980s, 1990s, and 2000s, Neven established himself as a prominent adult model and adult film icon under the stage name Casey Jordan. Blessed with a symmetry developed from years of competitive gymnastics, he was widely celebrated for his aesthetic good looks and incredibly muscular body. He frequently crossed over into print media, modeling extensively for numerous high-profile gay erotica and adult magazines of the era, which solidified his status as a popular pin-up and physical ideal within the LGBTQ+ community.

Neven entered the gay adult film industry in 1987, quickly rising to prominence as a contract star for Falcon Studios. His early career was defined by lead roles in high-profile features such as Out of Bounds, Perfect Summer, and Spokes II.

After a brief hiatus to focus on his fitness ventures, he returned to the screen between 1994 and 1995, starring in pivotal Falcon Studios titles including New Pledgemaster and The Backroom. He continued to work selectively within the adult industry as an actor and adult contemporary music songwriter, maintaining an active, decade-spanning career until his final retirement from the screen in 2011.

=== Television and Film Media ===
Beyond fitness instruction, Neven frequently appeared as a health expert on mainstream television, making guest appearances on ABC's Good Morning America, Extra, and FitTV. He was hired by TLC as the resident on-camera trainer for the reality television series Ballroom Bootcamp, which followed amateurs undergoing intensive athletic dance training. His fitness philosophies and specialized routines were profiled in publications including People, Self, Shape, Fitness, Angeleno, and TV Guide.

In 2004, Neven co-starred in and co-produced the documentary film Naked Fame. The film, which featured appearances by industry veterans Colton Ford and Chi Chi LaRue, chronicled Ford's public departure from adult cinema to pursue a mainstream career in dance and electronic music.

== Personal life ==
Neven was an open and active resident of West Hollywood, California.

=== Activism ===
In his later years, he became a staunch online political activist and a vocal critic of the Donald Trump administration. Writing on social media platforms under the moniker Kyle (Buttonpusher) Neven, his fiercely partisan commentary and heated debates frequently resulted in temporary user suspensions from platforms like Facebook. He lived with his romantic partner of 17 years.

== Death ==
On October 9, 2018, Neven was found dead in his West Hollywood home by his partner. Close friends and public statements later confirmed the cause of death was an accidental drowning in his bathtub. Following his death, friends publicly debunked initial internet rumors that suggested his passing was a suicide tied to his social media suspensions, noting that Neven was in remarkably high spirits, celebrating major career milestones, and actively planning family vacations in the days leading up to the accident. He was 50 years old.

== Filmography ==
=== Film ===
Year	Title	Role	Notes
1987	Out of Bounds	The Cousin	Debut
1988	Spokes 2: The Graduation	Richard	
1988	Touch Me: It's Hot, It's Tender	Troy	
1988	Perfect Summer	James	
1990	Body Worship 1	Leon	
1994	Slam Bam, Thank You Man	Andrew	
1994	Ruthless	Jeremy	
1994	Getting Even with David	Russel	
1994	The Best of JT Sloan	Casey Jordan	
1994	The Backroom	Casey	
1994	New Pledgemaster	Casey	
1995	Hard Lessons: Sex Ed 2	George	
1995	Driven Home	The Husband	
1995	Boot Black 2: Spit Shine	Ben	
1995	Hoghounds 2	Carl	
1995	A Score of Sex: Johnny Rey's Sex Series 2	Casey Jordan	
1995	Hot Blades	Max	
1996	Uniform Code: Sex Ed 4	Sam	
1996	Hair Trigger 1	Chris	
1996	Down in the Dirt	Steve	
1996	Pheromones: The Smell of Sex (Johnny Rey Sex Series 3)	Gary	
1997	Leather Sensations	Brent	
1998	Young Guys in Heat 2	Casey Jordan	
1998	Rock Hard Cocks (Rawhide)	Casey Jordan	
2001	At Your Service 3 (Hollywood)	Casey Jordan	
2002	Gay Ass Worship	Casey Jordan	
2004	Naked Fame	Himself	
2006	Butt Pirates	Casey	
2006	The Best of the Rockland Brothers	Casey	
2008	Best of the 1980s 1	Billy	
2009	Bareback Classics 1	Norris	
2009	The Best of Rex Chandler vs. Steve Hammond	Casey Jordan	
2009	Best of the 1980s 2	Casey Jordan	
2010	Rites of Initiation	Alex	
2010	The Lumber Yard	Victor	
2011	Falcon 40th Anniversary Collector's Edition	Casey Jordan	
2011	My Big Fucking Dick 2: Ken Ryker	Casey Jordan	
2011	The Best of Chad Douglas	Casey Jordan	
2011	Fuck Me Raw 1	Casey Jordan	
2011	Fuck Me Raw 2	Casey Jordan	
2013	Loads of Leather	Casey Jordan	
2013	Riveting Raw Threeways! (Falcon Bareback 12)	Casey Jordan	
2013	Raw Outdoor Balling (Falcon Bareback 16)	Casey Jordan	
2021	Falcon Icons: The 1980s	Casey Jordan	Posthumous release
2023	High Stakes Wrestling 1 & 2	Casey Jordan	Posthumous release

== Awards and nominations ==
Year	Award	Category	Title	Result	Ref
1995	Gay Erotic Video Awards	Best Music	A Score of Sex: Johnny Rey's Sex Series 2	Won	
