= Sex & Gasoline =

Studio album by Rodney Crowell
- Released: September 2, 2008
- Recorded: July 25 – October 12, 2007
- Venue: South Pasadena, California
- Studio: Garfield House
- Genres: Country, Americana
- Label: Work Song/Yep Roc
- Producer: Joe Henry

Rodney Crowell chronology
The Outsider (2005)	Sex & Gasoline (2008)	Old Yellow Moon (2013)

Sex & Gasoline is the thirteenth studio album by American country music singer-songwriter Rodney Crowell. Released in 2008 on the independent record label Yep Roc Records, the album is a topical release dealing largely with gender issues in the United States, particularly the treatment of women in American culture. It is made up entirely of original Crowell compositions.

Crowell released the album at a critically acclaimed juncture in his career. As he focused more on artistic merit and lyrically-driven sound, he honed in on a central theme for the tracks. He drew inspiration from his personal life including his wife and four daughters. Joe Henry produced the album using a group of musicians with whom Crowell had not previously worked. Principal recording took place in South Pasadena, California in 2007.

The album received largely favorable reviews though it was seen as a lesser effort than Crowell's previous three releases. It charted on Billboard's Top Country Albums and Independent Albums and was nominated for Best Contemporary Folk/Americana Album at the 51st Annual Grammy Awards.

== Context ==
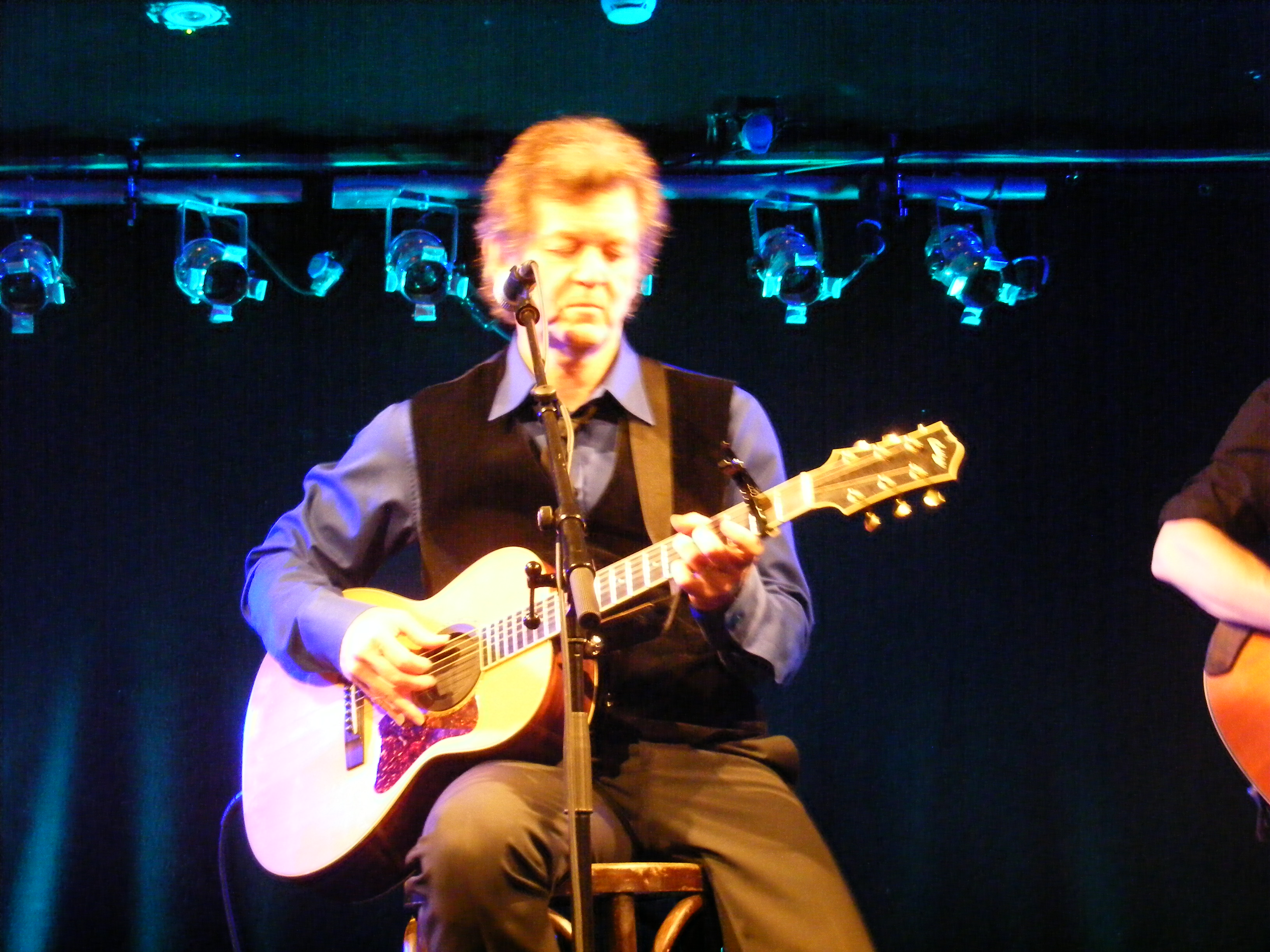
Crowell onstage in Dublin, Ireland.

Just ahead of the release of Rodney Crowell's 2005 album The Outsider, Crowell performed a show in Glasgow, Scotland at which he played the song that would become the title track for Sex & Gasoline. David Peschek of The Guardian described it as having a "surprisingly angular guitar motif [that] scythes into lyrics about the sexual exploitation of the young." At the end of the song, someone in the Glasgow crowd yelled "Play some country!" To which, Crowell responded, "It doesn't exist anymore, haven't you heard?" Upon its release, The Outsider received critical acclaim. However, during the tour in support of the album, Crowell was criticized for straying from the lyrically-driven country folk sound he is known for, in favor of "bland roots-rock." During a 2006 show in San Francisco at which Crowell once again performed "Sex and Gasoline", Jim Harrington of the East Bay Times described the song as simplistic and preachy, comparing it unfavorably to the 1980s output of Glenn Frey and Phil Collins, with "pointless guitar leads ... straight out of the arena rock handbook." Crowell later recounted how friends at a show in Ireland informed him the music was too loud, drowning out his lyrics. With Sex & Gasoline on the horizon, he chose to push his poetry to the forefront, shifting from a "bandleader to communicator."

At this time in his career, Crowell was still in the process of restyling himself as a "mature poet/troubadour" in the vein of Bob Dylan, rather than just a hit-maker. Although he had a recent hit with Keith Urban's 2004 cover of "Making Memories of Us", which spent five weeks at number one on the country charts, Crowell was no longer the same "bona fide hit machine" who charted five number one singles from his 1988 album Diamonds & Dirt. He was not "happy or fulfilled as a country star" and five years ahead of his 2001 autobiographical release The Houston Kid, Crowell took off to focus on his personal life. He learned how to maintain a marriage (to his third wife Claudia Church) and spent time with his four daughters (three of whom were born to second ex wife Rosanne Cash, and one born to his first ex wife). With his return to music, he viewed himself more as an artist and focused on his craft, disregarding commercial appeal. His latest trio of albums, including The Outsider and The Houston Kid as well as the 2003 release Fate's Right Hand were highly regarded and cemented his legacy as an icon among the often artistically-minded outside-the-mainstream alt-country and Americana communities. In fact, Crowell received the Lifetime Achievement Award for songwriting at the 2006 Americana Music Honors & Awards at which he debuted "A Moving Work of Art."

== Production ==
=== Composition ===
Crowell employed the same technique for writing that he used on his previous three releases: "find a core theme, a central driving point, and coax myself into writing much the same way you'd write a book or a film script where it's not just a collection of ten or eleven songs, but a world you enter."

The core theme for the album derived from one of Crowell's daughters who "let herself be led to death's door because she didn't fit society's image." Furthermore, Crowell's wife, a former model and singer, had difficulties in dealing with the aging process in her line of work. From these experiences, Crowell chose "to articulate something about the feminine archetype." He wanted to understand womanhood and immerse himself in it to understand the choices of his loved ones. He wrote "Sex and Gasoline" first and then "Truth Decay" and "I Want You" followed along the same thematic lines. He wrote other songs that he did not include on the album for thematic purposes.

=== Recording ===
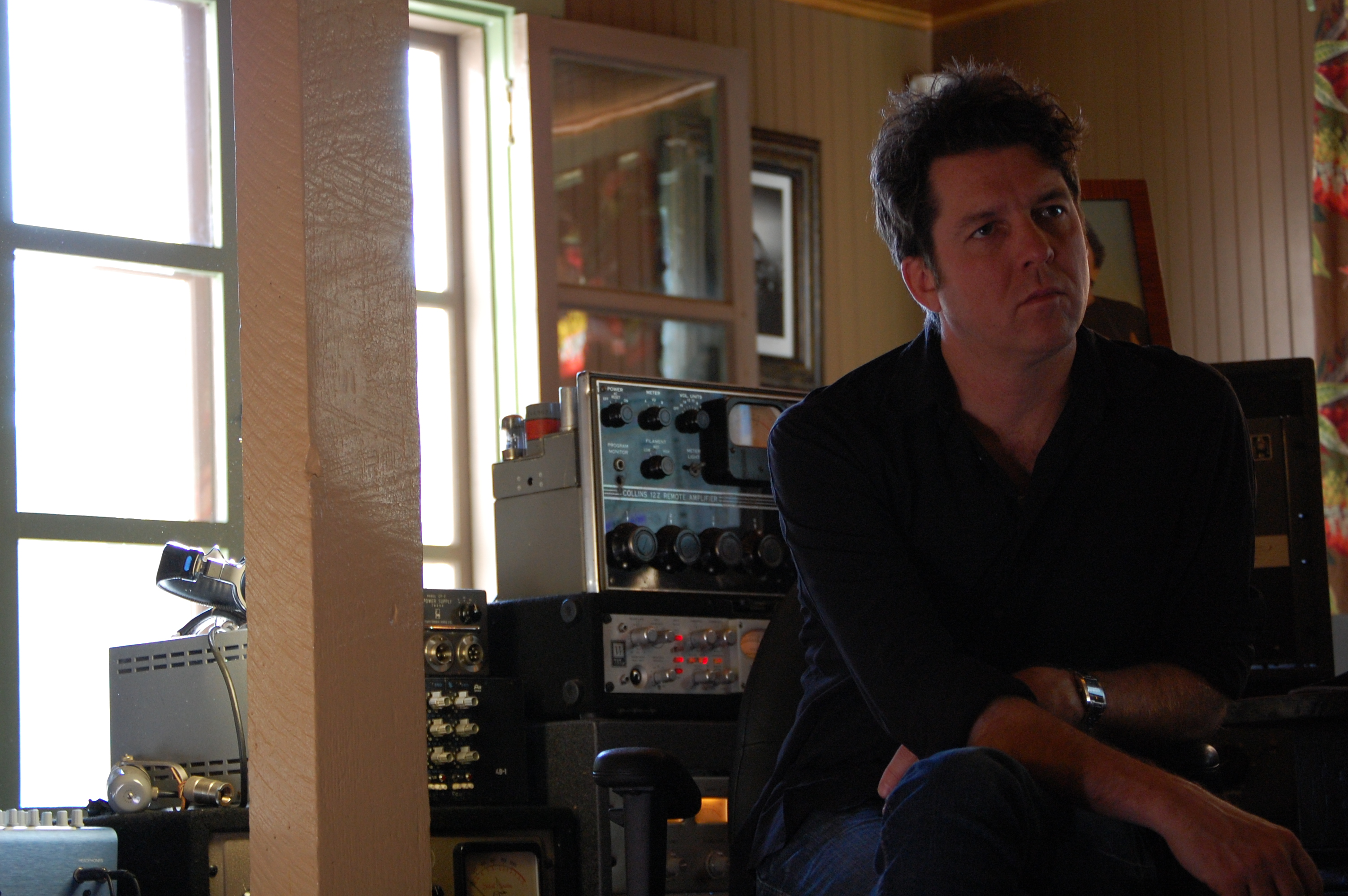
Joe Henry at the Garfield House.

For the first time in his career, Crowell turned to an outsider to produce one of his albums. He had originally recorded and produced a full album of songs himself but upon listening to the result he decided they were too close to the material he had already released. He scrapped the album entirely and headed to California to recreate it with a group of musicians he did not know. He chose Joe Henry, who, at the time, was known for his work with jazz musicians, to be the producer. Henry was noted for his tendency to approach each project uniquely and to experiment with different styles. In Crowell's words, "Henry produced, and I shut up and sang. The end result is some of the best performances I've given to date. I should have done this sooner." He referred to Henry's production as "liberating." Crowell described his singing and guitar-playing on the album as the best he ever recorded to that point in his career.

Through Henry's guidance, progressive musicians such as string master Greg Leisz, bassist David Piltch, and percussionist Jay Bellerose were added to the project. Henry used the trio on his previous project, the Loudon Wainwright III album Recovery. Guitarist Doyle Bramhall II also joined. Recording took place in South Pasadena, California in July and October 2007 at the historic Garfield House. Due to his lack of total control over the project, Crowell initially had difficulty with the sessions and remained only for a total of four or five days. He did not stay for the mixing, asking Henry to mail it to him once completed. While recording the track "Truth Decay," Crowell used Phil Everly of the Everly Brothers for inspiration. Crowell wanted Everly to sing harmony on the track but Everly was in Tennessee and could not travel to California. Instead, Crowell imagined how Everly would sound on the track while recording. Everly later recorded overdubs for the track back in Tennessee, which Claudia Church filmed. Crowell called that session a highlight of his career.

== Content ==
=== Theme and style ===
Sex & Gasoline is the fourth and final in a series of albums, starting with The Houston Kid, in which Crowell explores personal themes in a "struggle to come to terms with the new millennium." Women serve as the inspiration for the collection of eleven original songs. Allmusic describes them as "accessible and jagged observations on the conflicting poles in what it means to be a conscious human being who struggles with unconscious urges" as well as the struggle of being a man who attempts, often unsuccessfully, to respect women in a culture that sometimes expresses hatred toward them. The Rolling Stone called it "not just a celebration of women, but a real attempt at empathy." Blurt felt the emphasis on women from the perspective of men paradoxically offered more insight on the male sex than the female. Referencing the title, County Universe noted the album has very little to do with gasoline, and is focused more on sex, not sexual intercourse but gender. Comparing it to The Houston Kid, the Houston Chronicle suggested the album offered insights rooted in the present day rather than the past. Other themes explored include aging, sexual appetite, the consequences of a celebrity-obsessed media, heartache, sadness, regret, a troubled society, and mortality.

Although the album at times boasts an edgy rock style, particularly the title track, others are more poetic and introspective. Overall, it is less rock-infused than The Outsider and The Houston Kid, but less folk-leaning than some of Crowell's other work. The Houston Chronicle places it in a unique category of its own. Texas Monthly compared its sound to Dylan's mid-period. PopMatters said it shared the spirit of 1960's Dylan. Blurt observed it had the same "swampy, bluesy feel" as Dylan's 1997 album Time Out of Mind. It is largely acoustic. Country Standard Time described it as too atmospheric to be country and too rustic to be rock or pure pop. The tracks range in outlook from fatalistic to idyllic, with a sense of urgency. The tone is markedly more negative than Crowell's previous efforts, but still warm and smoky. Although, comedic elements are present it is often in the vein of dark humor.

=== Track by track ===
Sex and Gasoline

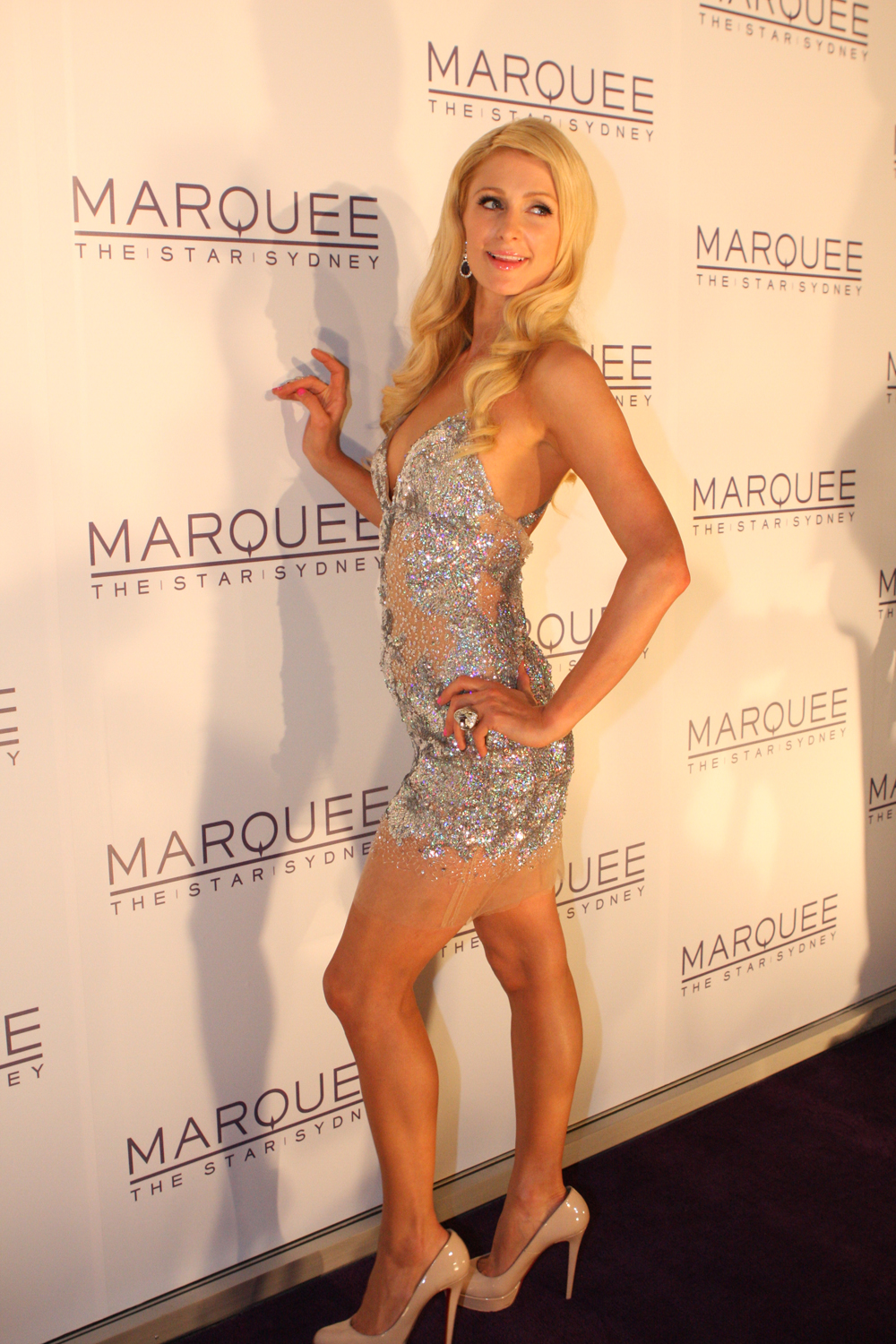
Concerning the track "Sex and Gasoline" Crowell says "If you're not a size zero, or have legs like Paris Hilton (pictured), you're sexually irrelevant."

The opening track "Sex and Gasoline" is a satire using the voice of society to connect to the album's underlying theme of the oversexualization of women in the United States. With what the Los Angeles Times describes as "Dylanesque bite," Crowell rails against society's emphasis on the feminine beauty ideal. Broadly, he expounds upon what makes this "mean old world run." It features layers of acoustic guitar, a piano with "strident yet warm" notes, mandolin, and a throbbing bassline accompanying the lyrics. In an interview with the Houston Chronicle, Crowell revealed the song to be "about a young woman very close to me that our culture was just beating to a pulp. And it made me angry." With The Aspen Times, Crowell expanded "If you're not a size zero, or have legs like Paris Hilton, you're sexually irrelevant. If you're 42, you might get traded in for a younger woman. Your intelligence and wisdom is not relevant anymore."

Moving Work of Art

The second track "Moving Work of Art" describes the beauty of a woman in full, channeling the work of Townes Van Zandt. It employs symbology open for interpretation. To Allmusic, Crowell uses the track to examine his own treatment of women, concluding he is guilty of objectifying them despite his contrary intentions. Crowell observes the shift to respect from objectification often occurs too late. The similarly ambiguous arrangement straddles the country blues genre. It features a "mesmerizing" quiet beat that goes in and out of a mute steel guitar, invoking reverie.

The Rise and Fall of Intelligent Design

The third track, the politically-charged mid-tempo shuffle "The Rise and Fall of Intelligent Design" asks how the world would be if Crowell were a woman. Through a pulse of steel guitar fingerpicking, soft toms, shuffling acoustics, and a buried bass drum, Crowell questions what he would do as a woman. In doing so, he discusses the possibility of a female President of the United States and presumes one might be better at the job than a man, resolving the Iraq War and air pollution. PopMatters connects these lyrics to the 2008 presidential campaign of then-Senator Hillary Clinton. It notes Crowell did not support Clinton in the Democratic Party primaries, opting to back former Senator John Edwards.

Truth Decay

The next track, "Truth Decay" is a melodic ballad on which Crowell says he channeled Phil Everly to sing harmony without his natural vibrato so as not to "undermine the integrity of the composition." Everly came out of retirement to provide background vocals. It shares its title with T Bone Burnett's 1980 album.

I Want You #35

"I Want You #35", a title that echoes two Dylan songs "I Want You" and "Rainy Day Women #12 & #35" (both from Dylan's Blonde on Blonde), is about an affluent girl who learns to "bow [her] head" and "lift [her] skirt" from an early age. It presents a betrayal of lust and a narrator who sees value beyond freshly desire. The track features bluesy moaning vocals on top of an upright bass thump.

Who Do You Trust

The sixth track, "Who Do You Trust" is a fatalistic track on which Crowell expresses contempt. Its underlying message is that nobody can be trusted. Musically, it has a "funky groove" backed with a "gospel fervor."

I've Done Everything I Can

The seventh track, "I've Done Everything I Can" is a duet between Crowell and Joe Henry in which the two have a conversation about Crowell's helplessness as a father in coming to grips with the choices of his troubled daughter. It combines the sadness of giving a daughter her freedom with the pride of knowing she can choose the right path herself based on the foundation the father built in raising her. The Houston Chronicle purports Henry's vocals to be that of a friend or Crowell's conscience itself.

The Night's Just Right

The next track, "The Night's Just Right" is a retrospective, tender ballad in which Crowell "lets a little light shine in." PopMatters describes the lyric "I'm okay as long as I can laugh / I don't care if everything goes wrong" as emblematic of the dark comedic elements on the album. George Strait previously recorded the song as "The Night's Just Right for Love" on his 2000 eponymous album.

Funky and the Farm-Boy

"Funky and the Farm-Boy" is a narrative with a bluesy, good-time feel on which Crowell, with the delivery of a folksinger, discusses sexual obsession. The band is afforded some latitude on the track, prominently featuring the guitar work of Doyle Bramhall III and vocals of Niki Haris and Sister Jane McLain.

Forty Winters

The penultimate track "Forty Winters" is a ballad about Alzheimer's disease and the passage of time. On the track, Crowell sings as a voice of conscience. Instrumentally, it features an acoustic guitar and not much else.

Closer to Heaven

The last track, "Closer to Heaven" starts with Crowell, in a "slightly curmudgeonly" way, listing his dislikes or what the Huffington Post calls "empty vessels", including sushi, hummus, noisy neighbors, golf, and "buzzwords like 'awesome' and 'dude'." He also lists some of the things he likes such as Guy Clark, Sissy Spacek, his children, and biscuits and gravy. He concludes that despite his crankiness, he is "closer to heaven" than he has ever been.

== Reception ==
=== Professional reviews ===
Professional ratings
Review scores
Source	Rating
Allmusic	4/5 stars
The Austin Chronicle	4.5/5 stars
Country Universe	3.5/5 stars
Los Angeles Times	3.5/4 stars
Paste	6.6/10
PopMatters	6/10 stars
Rolling Stone	3.5/5 stars
Slate Magazine	3.5/5 stars

Sex & Gasoline received generally favorable reviews. Doug Freeman of The Austin Chronicle, who recognized Crowell as the "Lone Star State's Bob Dylan", gave the album 4.5 out of five stars. He praised Joe Henry for bringing forth the "genuine and personal narratives" of Crowell with blunt impact. Thom Yurek of Allmusic gave the album four out of five stars, calling it the kind of album Crowell has wanted to make since The Houston Kid. Yurek cited Crowell's ability to make "emotions almost visible" through the work, comparing the anger of the opening track with that of Steve Earle combined with the elegance of Dylan. Doug Collette of Glide lauded Crowell's ability "to illuminate eternal truths without overstatement, pretension or pedantry" from an oblique angle. Mark Kemp of Rolling Stone gave the album 3.5 stars out of five and praised Crowell as a "master songwriter" regardless of genre. Randy Lewis of the Los Angeles Times gave the album three and a half out of four stars, complimenting Henry's production for amplifying "the muscle of Crowell’s lyrics and the immediacy of his vocals." Jim Farber of the New York Daily News applauded the charm of Crowell's literacy enhanced by Henry's production and declared Crowell as "close to making the best music of his career." Jewly Hight of Nashville Scene praised the "lithe, pulsing production" as well as the "highly literary fashion" of Crowell and described the musicians as "subtle geniuses." Greg Quill of the Toronto Star described the album as "masterful" and said it was probably the best work of Crowell in a decade, highlighting "The Rise and Fall of Intelligent Design" as the best track. Steve Klinge of Blurt compared it favorably to Diamonds & Dirt, having "literate, immediately appealing songs" and adding subtler hooks, more subdued tones, as well as more mature and interior insights. He highlighted "I’ve Done Everything I Can" and "The Rise And Fall Of Intelligent Design" as standout tracks.

Others were slightly less favorable. While Kevin John Coyne of Country Universe gave the album 3.5 out of five stars he labeled the release as disappointing and one of Crowell's lesser performances, adding "Crowell paints women as being victim to nearly insurmountable hurdles, but when singing of them as individuals, he awards them all the power." Jeff Leven of Paste gave the album a 6.6 out of ten, calling it "uneven but generally pleasant." He praised Henry's production for allowing Crowell's humor to prevail and applauded the guitar work of Doyle Bramhall II and Greg Leisz as being more intricate, at times, than the songs themselves. He faulted Crowell's Dylanesque vocals as setting the bar too high on his topical material, leaving it "too on-the-nose." Steve Horowitz of PopMatters agreed with the Dylan comparisons, saying Crowell shared Dylan's pretentiousness yielding "Dylan-like rage, prophecy, and poetry." He gave the album six out of ten stars, faulting it for being too much like his previous three releases, which gives the album strength but does not break any new ground or gain any new fans. Writing for the Chicago Reader, Peter Margasak criticized Crowell's "righteous indignation" as being overbearing at times. Jonathan Keefe of Slant Magazine gave the album 3.5 out of five stars, describing it as a letdown for being internally redundant and overwritten, yet still more topical and intelligent than other country releases. Keefe compared it unfavorably to Crowell's previous three releases, which he regarded as some of the best of the decade, but found it still as perhaps one of the strongest albums of the year. While offering praise for the first three tracks, Keefe described the rest of the album as predictable, chiding "Who Do You Trust" and "Closer to Heaven" for "relying on the same brand of free-associative poetry to make essentially the same point." Conversely, Stuart Munro of The Boston Globe faulted the title track for not explaining the "whys and wherefores" for society's emphasis on youth and beauty, and panned "The Rise and Fall of Intelligent Design" for not fully exploring the concept it introduces that understanding one's manhood requires an understanding of womanhood. Munro praised "I've Done Everything I Can" and "The Night's Just Right" where "the particulars imply some universal" truth. On his website Elsewhere, Graham Reid lauded the songwriting and production but questioned the inclusion of "Funky and the Farm-Boy." Ed Bumgardner in the Winston-Salem Journal described Crowell as "cranky" on "The Rise and Fall of Intelligent Design" and "Closer to Heaven" but found the album overall as a compelling portrait of "beauty in imperfection."

=== Chart performance and acclaim ===
Chart (2008)	Peak position
U.S. Billboard Top Country Albums	38
U.S. Billboard Independent Albums	35

The album peaked at number 38 on Billboard Top Country Albums chart and number 35 on the Independent Albums chart.

It was nominated for a Grammy Award at the 51st Annual Grammy Awards in the category of Best Contemporary Folk/Americana Album, losing to Record of the Year and Album of the Year winner Raising Sand by Robert Plant and Alison Krauss.

== Track listing ==
All songs were written by Rodney Crowell.

1. "Sex and Gasoline" - 4:28
2. "Moving Work of Art" - 4:30
3. "The Rise and Fall of Intelligent Design" - 4:28
4. "Truth Decay" - 4:30
5. "I Want You #35" - 3:31
6. "I've Done Everything I Can" - 5:34
7. "Who Do You Trust" - 4:08
8. "The Night's Just Right" - 3:51
9. "Funky and the Farm-Boy" - 4:08
10. "Forty Winters" - 4:43
11. "Closer to Heaven" - 5:20

== Personnel ==
- Jay Bellerose - percussion, drums
- Doyle Bramhall II - acoustic guitar, electric guitar
- Rodney Crowell - acoustic guitar, vocals
- Sally Dworsky - vocals
- Phil Everly - vocals on "Truth Decay"
- Niki Haris - background vocals
- Joe Henry - vocals, producer
- Greg Leisz - acoustic guitar, Dobro, mandolin, pedal steel, electric guitar, mandocello, lap steel guitar
- Jean McClain - background vocals
- David Piltch - electric bass, upright bass
- Patrick Warren - piano, Chamberlin, pump organ
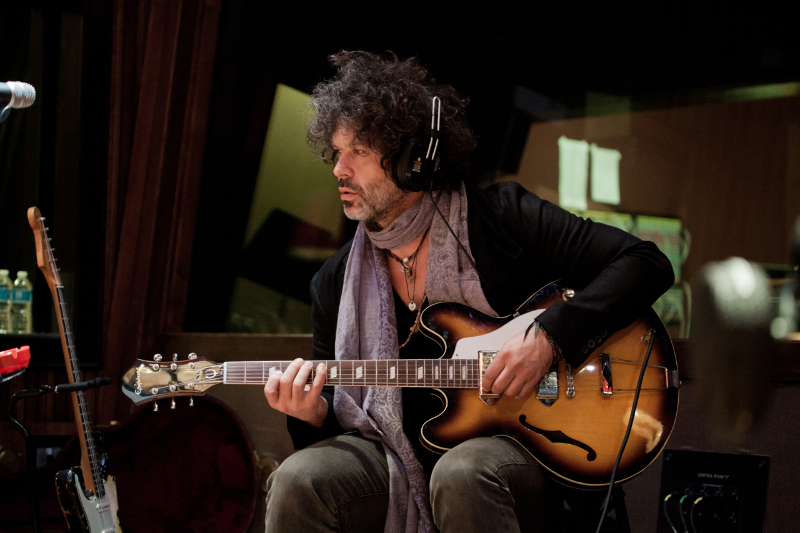
Doyle Bramhall II played acoustic and electric guitar.

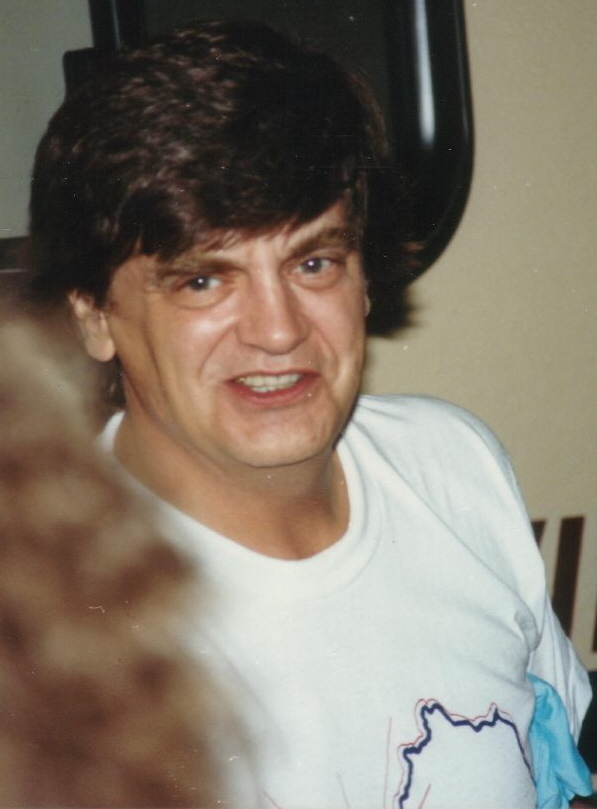
Phil Everly of the Everly Brothers provided vocals for "Truth Decay."

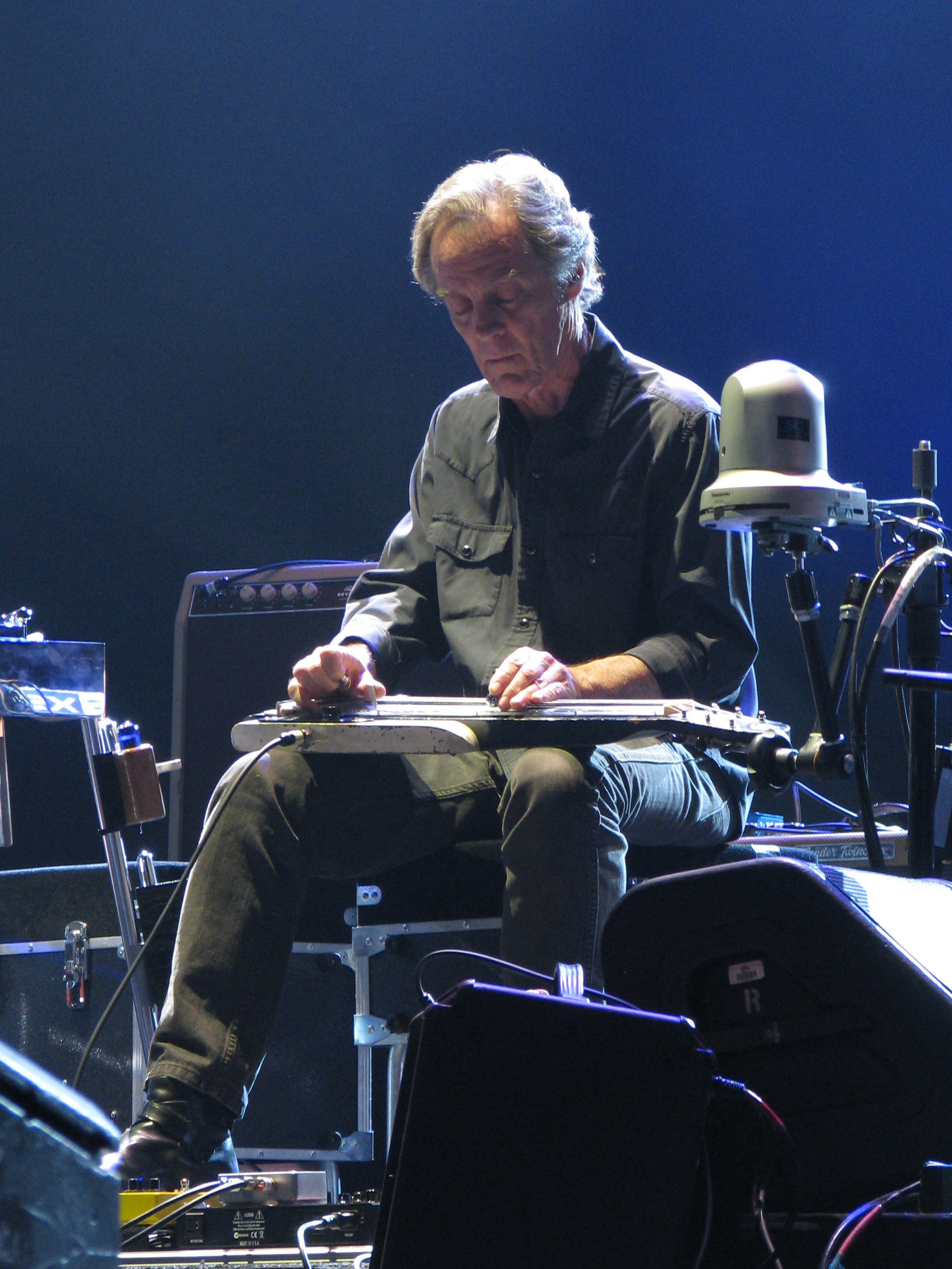
Greg Leisz played many instruments including lap steel guitar.

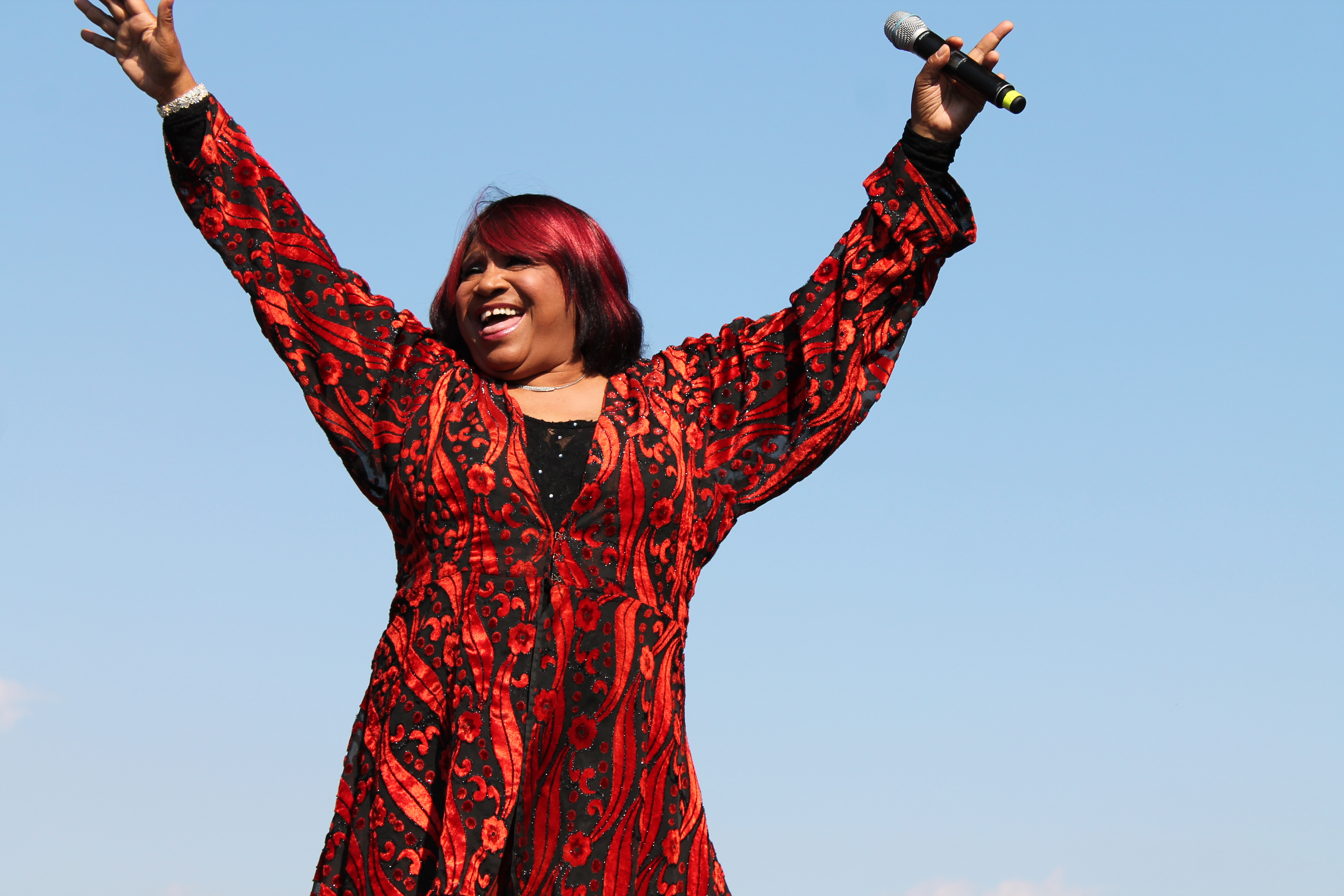
Jean McClain, also known as Pepper MaShay provided background vocals.
