= Naked Fame =

- Directed by: Christopher Long
- Produced by: Christopher Long
- Starring: Colton Ford; Blake Harper; Chi Chi La Rue; Pepper Mashay; Bruce Vilanch; Casey Jordan
- Distributed by: Regent Releasing; TLA Releasing
- Release date: February 18, 2005 (limited)
- Running time: 85 minutes
- Language: English
- Box office: $213,621 (US)

Naked Fame a documentary that follows Colton Ford's transition from the world of gay pornography to that of a mainstream singer. It opened on February 18, 2005, in the United States to mixed critical reviews.

== Synopsis ==
At the age of 40, porn star Colton Ford decides to leave the industry and pursue his true calling—a singing career. He feels he has the voice, but his "overexposed" past could be the hook that gets him noticed or the hook that yanks him off stage. Naked Fame follows Colton and his former life-partner, porn star Blake Harper, as they try to ease their way back into the mainstream.

The film examines the inner-workings of music industry and documents the emotional struggles involved in the pursuit of one's dreams. It contains footage and interviews from Chi Chi LaRue, Bruce Vilanch, Pepper Mashay and Lonnie Gordon, and Ford's parents.

== Reaction ==
Naked Fame received mixed reviews from leading movie critics. On Rotten Tomatoes the film has a score of 50% based on reviews from 8 critics.

Los Angeles Times film critic Kevin Thomas called it "an engaging and forthright documentary" and New York Post critic Russell Smith found it to be "a sunny movie full of likable characters" In contrast, Peter L'Official of The Village Voice said "there are many dreadful elements in this chronicle" and David Noh of Film Journal International thought the director was "scrambling" with "flimsy material."

Naked Fame grossed $213,621 in the United States.
