= Michael Brandon (pornographic film actor) =

American pornographic film director & actor (b. 1965)

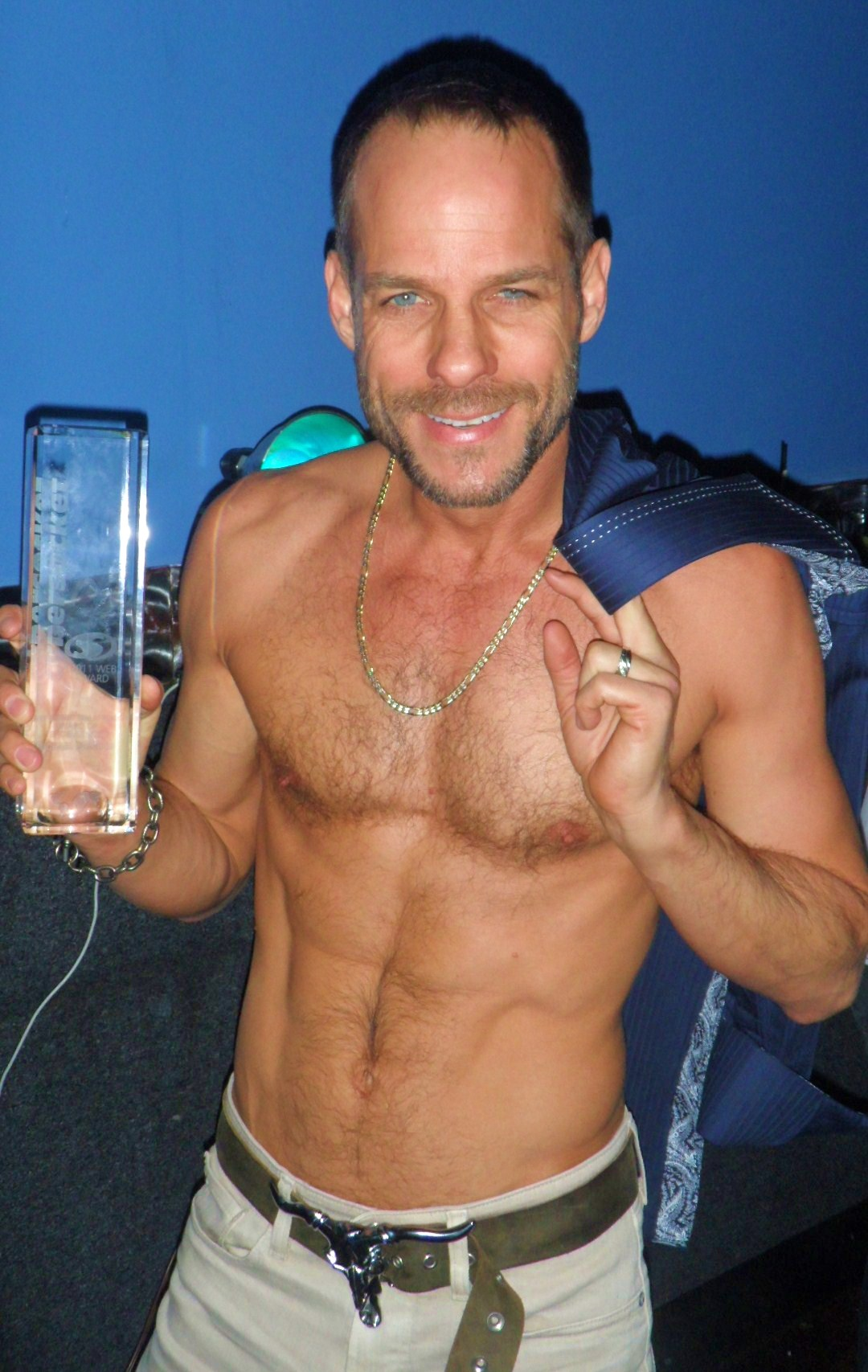
- Brandon at the 2011 CyberSocket Awards
- Born: February 8, 1965 (age 61); Huntington Beach, California, U.S.
- Other names: Monster; Mike Phillips
- Occupations: Actor; director
- Years active: 1989–present

Michael Brandon (born February 8, 1965) is an American pornographic actor and director (formerly exclusive to Raging Stallion Studios) who specializes in gay pornography. He has had his own subdivision at Raging Stallion called "Monster Bang" and has previously participated in some charitable efforts.

== Career ==
Brandon helped set up Raging Stallion Studios and has stated that he started in porn after answering an ad in Frontiers magazine. He began his career in porn in 1989. In 1990 and again in 1997, Brandon was convicted on drug possession charges and eventually spent three years in jail. In 2007, he was arrested again for drug possession. He also directed, produced, and wrote Passport to Paradise.

Brandon appeared in nearly 200 films between 1999 and 2006, and he eventually directed his own line of films known as the "MonsterBang videos". He has engaged in what appeared to be a very busy escorting career that was documented on his website and on an online escort review site (Daddysreviews.com).

In 2011, he became Vice President of 9X6 Lube.

In 2013, he co-hosted Grabby Awards ceremony.

In 2014, he became new executive director of the Community Initiative (originally the Gay Men's Community Initiative, now simply Community), a community-based group that helps queer men in San Francisco.

== Awards and nominations ==
Brandon won the "Performer of the Year" at the 2001 GayVN Awards and tied for that same award in 2002 with Colton Ford. At the 2002 Adult Erotic Video Awards ("The Grabbys"), he was named, with Chad Hunt, as "Best Performers". Brandon was added to the "Grabby Wall of Fame" in 2003 and received a "Surprise Award" Grabby for "Hottest Cock" in 2005.

== Partial videography ==
- Czech Point (Studio 2000) (1999)
- Cadet Convoy (2005)
- Michael Brandon: Virtually Yours (2004)
- Down Right Dangerous (2003)
- Hard at Work (Raging Stallion) (2003)
- The List (MSR Videos) (2003)
- Plexus: Hardcore (2003)
- A Porn Star is Born (2003)
- The Sexus, Nexus and Plexus Trilogy (2002–2003)
- Cockpit 1 & 2 (Catalina Video) (2000–2003)
- Latin Tendencies (2002)
- Saluting Michael Brandon (2002)
- Trespass (Titan Media) (2002)
- In Gear (2001)
- Michael Brandon: Down & Dirty (2001)
- The Best of Michael Brandon (1999)
- Air Male (1989)

== See also ==
- List of male performers in gay porn films
- List of Grabby recipients

Adult Erotic Video Awards ("The Grabbys") Hall of Fame; 2003	VN Awards Hall of Fame; 2006

Awards
Preceded by Blake Harper	VN Awards for Performer of the Year; 2002	Succeeded by Michael Brandon and Colton Ford
Preceded by Michael Brandon	VN Awards for Performer of the Year (tie with Colton Ford); 2003	Succeeded by Joe Foster
Preceded by Blake Harper	Adult Erotic Video Awards ("The Grabbys") for Best Performers (tie with Chad Hunt); 2002	Succeeded by Carlos Morales and Matthew Rush
Preceded by Chad Hunt	Adult Erotic Video Awards ("The Grabbys") for Hottest Cock; 2005	Succeeded by Trevor Knight
