= Pepper MaShay =

American singer-songwriter

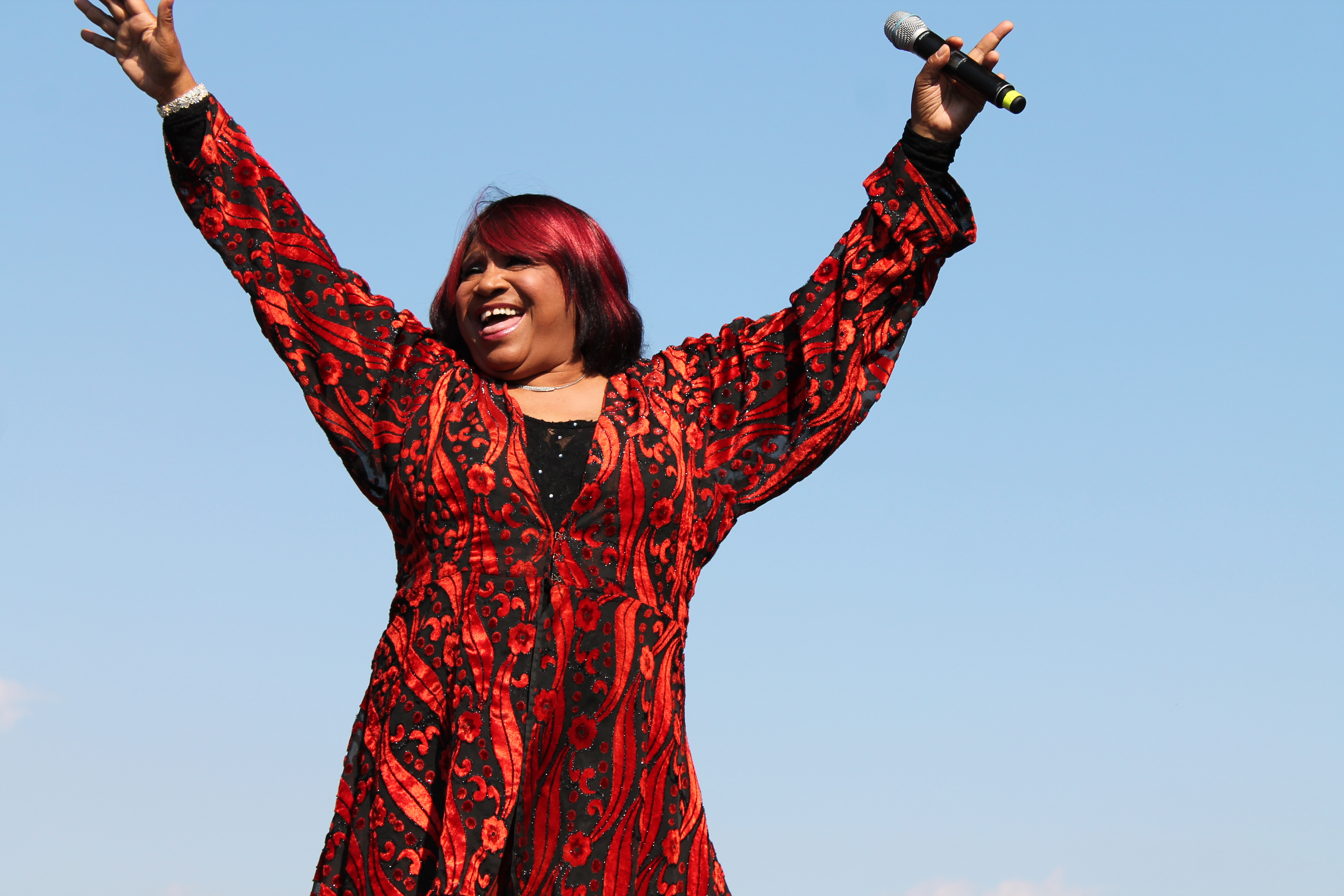
- Mashay performing at Gay Pride in Washington D.C. in 2012

Background information
- Also known as: Sista Jean McClain
- Born: Jean McClain; March 8, 1953 (age 73)
- Genres: Dance, gospel, R&B, soul, pop
- Occupations: Singer, musician, songwriter
- Instrument: Vocals
- Years active: 1977–present

Jean McClain (born March 8, 1953), known professionally as Pepper Mashay, is an American soul, house and dance music singer-songwriter.

== Early life ==
McClain grew up in Muncie, Indiana. Growing up, her musical influences were Janis Joplin, Joni Mitchell and Bob Dylan. She left Indiana in her 20s to pursue her career.

== Career ==
Mashay was contracted to sing back-up for the soundtrack of Tina Turner's movie What's Love Got to Do with It. She spent two days with Tina Turner saying, "She is rock n' roll".

In 1995, Mashay's manager at the time contacted Michael O'Hara to work on an initial demo for a possible recording deal. They wrote five songs together in her California home, but the songs never went anywhere. Mashay ended up writing a song called "Something to Feel" and it got picked up by Island Records. In her thirties, music labels in the '90s thought she was too old for a record deal but she never gave up.

Mashay has an extensive résumé of work as a background and session singer working, most notably, with Gladys Horton in a 1980s regrouping of The Marvelettes. Mashay's photo can be seen on the cover of the CD The Marvelettes: The Very Best of the Motor City Recordings.

As a lead vocalist, Mashay has released many tracks that have performed well on the U.S. Hot Dance Club Play chart and the Hot Dance Airplay chart. Those singles include "Something to Feel" (1995), "Happiness" (1997), "Step into My Life" (1998), "Sextacy" (2000) and "Send Me an Angel" (2005). Her voice is probably best known from the "Let's get soaking wet!" chanting throughout the Barry Harris track "Dive in the Pool", made famous by its inclusion in the American television series Queer as Folk. Another collaboration with Harris, "I Got My Pride", topped the U.S. Hot Dance Music/Club Play chart in July 2001. In late 2006, Pepper Mashay earned her first solo chart-topper on the U.S. Hot Dance Music/Club Play chart with the song "Lost Yo Mind". It has attained moderate to heavy rotation on dance-oriented radio stations, charting well on the Hot Dance Airplay. Mashay issued her single, "Got to Give the People What They Want" in late January 2008 and "Does Your Mamma Know" during the fourth quarter of 2008. She toured with House's Hugh Laurie officially as part of his band, Hugh Laurie & The Copper Bottom Band.

Mashay also performs as Sista Jean & CB, has released two albums under that name. The first was the 2013 release Back to the Root. Next was the 2015 album Requiem for a Heavy Weight, a tribute to Odetta, an icon in the folk & blues genre.

== Discography ==
=== Singles ===
- 1995: "Something to Feel"
- 1995: "By Any Means Necessary" (with Lenny White)
- 1997: "Happiness"
- 1997: "Not Much Heaven"
- 1998: "Into You"
- 1998: "Right Back to Love" (with Subsystem)
- 1998: "Step 2 Me" (Grant Nelson feat. Jean McClain) - (UK #92, UK Dance #7)
- 1998: "Step into My Life"
- 1998: "You've Got to Go" (with DJ Alexia)
- 2000: "Sextacy"
- 2000: "Here's to Life"
- 2000: "Dive in the Pool" (with Barry Harris)
- 2001: "Love Pretender" (with Frank 'O Moiraghi)
- 2001: "I Got My Pride"
- 2001: "You and Me (Feels So Good)" (with Solar City)
- 2002: "I Want You in My Life" (with Max Iron)
- 2002: "I Pledge"
- 2002: "Let's Runaway" (with Scott Michael)
- 2002: "No More Drama" (with Mary J. Blige, Thunderpuss Club Anthem Mix)
- 2003: "Happy New Year" (with Ernest Kohl)
- 2003: "I Can't Stop"
- 2003: "You're My Inspiration"
- 2004: "Electro Illusion"
- 2004: "Signed, Sealed, Delivered I'm Yours" (with Colton Ford) (cover of the Stevie Wonder song)
- 2005: "Send Me an Angel" (cover of the Real Life song)
- 2005: "Beauty Shop" (featured in the film Beauty Shop)
- 2006: "Lost Yo Mind"
- 2008: "Got to Give the People What They Want"
- 2008: "Does Your Mamma Know" (with @djCoreyD ) https://www.youtube.com/playlist?list=OLAK5uy_nnqIMQn8d_mt8l7ZNeOdCtSf98NDwAhUg Winner USA Songwriting Competition 2009: Best Dance/EDM song
- 2009: "Freeway of Love" (cover of the Aretha Franklin song)
- 2009: "Burning" (with World of Colour)
- 2011: "Love S.O.S."
- 2011: "Things U Do"
- 2012: "Our World" (with Clemens Rumpf)
- 2013: "Dance Florr"
- 2014: "Does Your Mamma Know (You're A Freak)" (With @DJCoreyD ) https://www.youtube.com/watch?v=w7q-GQFDlSQ
- 2016: "You Stop Breakin' My Heart" (With Anderson and Thatcher) https://www.youtube.com/watch?v=PPsBysD_cfQ
- 2022: "Dancin' Lights Pt 2" https://www.youtube.com/watch?v=SpeVgm7edbw

== Session work appearances ==
- 1989: Peter Frampton – When All the Pieces Fit
- 1989: Lenny Kravitz – Let Love Rule
- 1989: Cher – Heart of Stone
- 1990: Lalah Hathaway – Lalah Hathaway
- 1991: Michael Bolton – Time, Love & Tenderness
- 1991: Neil Diamond – Lovescape
- 1991: Cher – Love Hurts
- 1991: Gladys Knight – Good Woman
- 1991: Patti Austin – Carry On
- 1992: Vonda Shepard – The Radical Light
- 1992: Celine Dion – Celine Dion
- 1992: Olivia Newton-John – Back To Basics
- 1993: Tina Turner – What's Love Got To Do With It
- 1993: Mick Jagger – Wandering Spirit
- 1993: Celine Dion – The Colour of My Love
- 1993: Texas – Ricks Road
- 1993: Ray Charles – My World
- 1993: Paul Rodgers – Muddy Water Blues: A Tribute to Muddy Waters
- 1993: Bruce Hornsby – Harbor Lights
- 1994: Victoria Williams – Loose
- 1994: Phish – Hoist
- 1994: Steve Perry – For the Love of Strange Medicine
- 1994: Julio Iglesias – Crazy
- 1995: Christopher Cross – Window
- 1995: Haddaway – The Drive
- 1995: Bobby Caldwell – Soul Survivor
- 1995: Phyllis Hyman – I refuse To Be Lonely
- 1996: Keb' Mo' – Just Like You
- 1996: Celine Dion – Falling into You
- 1997: Michael Lington – Michael Lington
- 1997: Michael Bolton – All That Matters
- 1998: CeCe Winans – His Gift
- 2002: Solomon Burke – Don't Give Up On Me
- 2003: Joe Henry – Tiny Voices
- 2005: Bobby Caldwell – Perfect Island Nights
- 2005: Susan Tedeschi – Hope And Desire
- 2007: Evelyn "Champagne" King – Open Book
- 2007: Tiffany – Just Me
- 2007: Bob Dylan – I'm Not There
- 2008: Rodney Crowell – Sex & Gasoline
- 2009: Irma Thomas – The Soul Queen Of New Orleans
- 2010: Aaron Neville – I Know I've Been Changed
- 2010: Sheryl Crow – 100 Miles from Memphis
- 2011: Hugh Laurie – Let Them Talk
- 2012: Jimmy Cliff – Rebirth
- 2013: Hugh Laurie – Didn't It Rain

== See also ==
- List of number-one dance hits (United States)
- List of artists who reached number one on the U.S. Dance chart
