= Garfield House (South Pasadena, California) =

- U.S. National Register of Historic Places
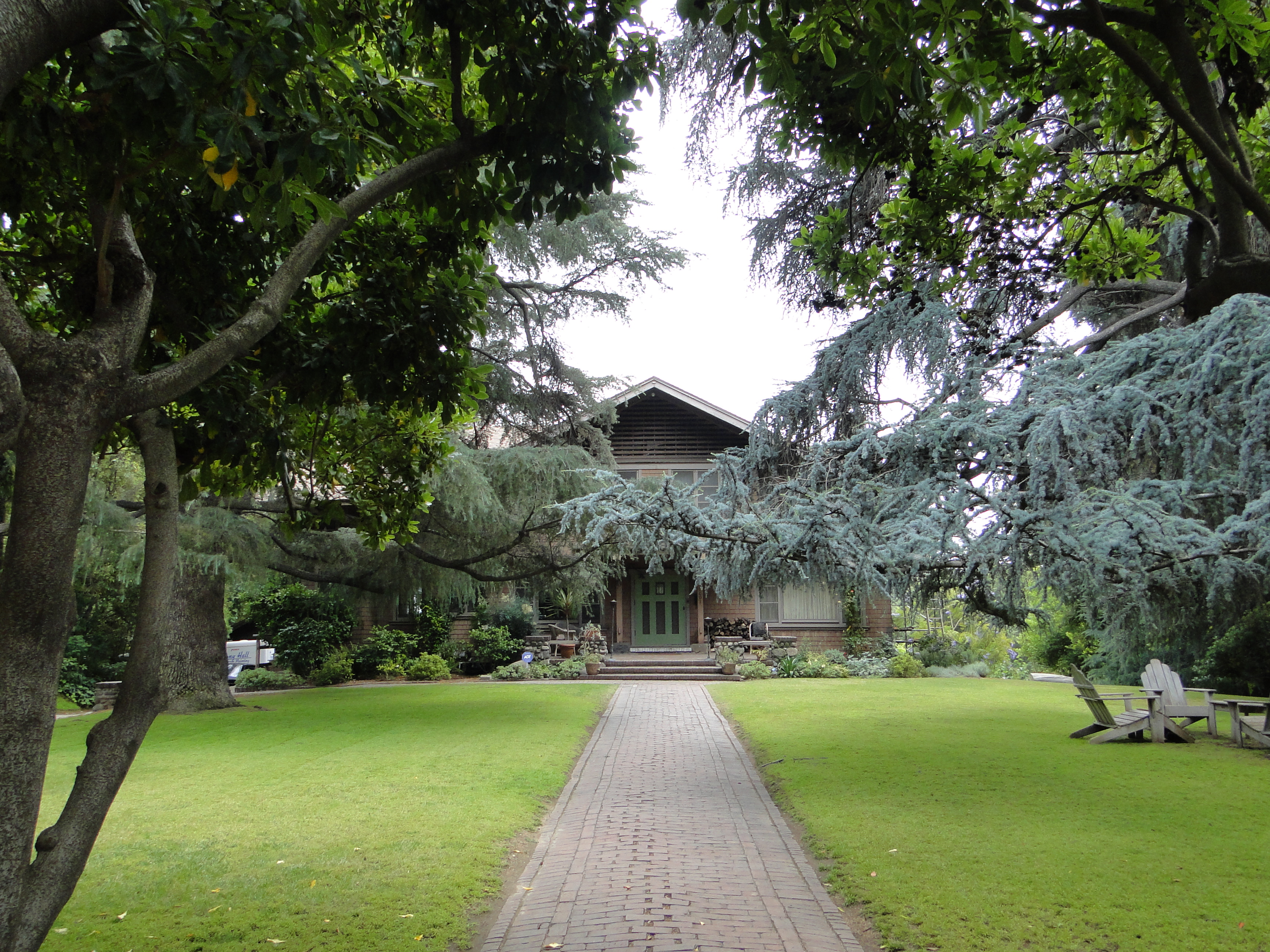
- The house in 2011

- Location within California
- Location: 1001 Buena Vista Street, South Pasadena, California
- Coordinates: 34°07′14″N 118°09′21″W
- Area: 0.5 acres (0.20 ha)
- Built: 1904
- Architect: Greene & Greene
- Architectural style: Bungalow/craftsman
- NRHP reference No.: 73000405
- Added to NRHP: April 24, 1973

The Garfield House is a historic two-story house in South Pasadena, California. It was built in 1904 for First Lady Lucretia Garfield, the widow of James A. Garfield who served as the 20th President of the United States in 1881. It was designed by Greene & Greene in the American Craftsman style. It has been listed on the National Register of Historic Places since April 24, 1973.

Musician and producer Joe Henry lived with his family in the house and had a recording studio in the basement for nine years.
