= Colton Ford =

American singer and actor (1962–2025)

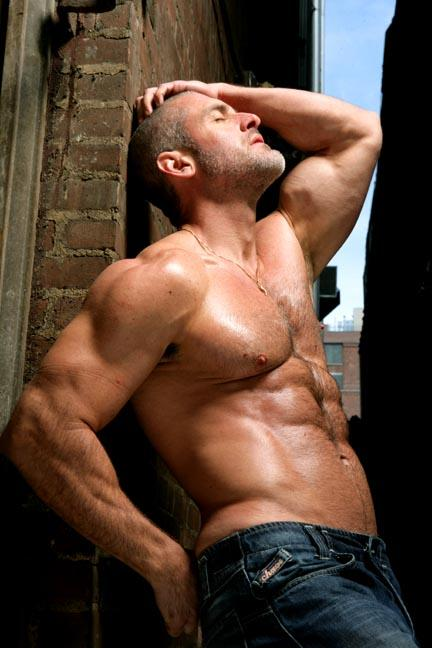
- Ford in 2009
- Born: Glenn Soukesian; October 12, 1962; Pasadena, California, U.S.
- Died: May 19, 2025 (aged 62); Palm Springs, California, U.S.
- Occupations: Singer; actor

Glenn Soukesian (October 12, 1962 – May 19, 2025), known professionally as Colton Ford, was an American singer and pornographic film actor. Ford began his adult film career at age 39, making twelve pornographic videos in ten months before leaving the industry in 2002 to refocus on his music career. Ford became very popular during his brief time in the adult film industry, receiving attention for his muscular physique and winning several awards, including the Grabby Award for Best Group Sex Scene in Conquered (2002) and the GayVN Award for Gay Performer of the Year in 2003.

After retiring from the adult film industry, Ford released five studio albums featuring a mix of R&B and dance music elements; he received the most attention for his dance music and related covers. Two of his songs charted on Billboard's Dance Club Songs: the cover "Signed, Sealed Delivered" (2004), released in collaboration with Pepper MaShay, and "Let Me Live Again" (2011). Ford embraced his sexual image, often incorporating homoerotic elements in his music videos. Beyond the adult film industry, Ford also featured in the 2005 documentary Naked Fame, which chronicled his transition into mainstream entertainment, and appeared as Sheriff Trout in the gay-themed TV series The Lair (2007–2009). Ford died in 2025 at the age of 62 due to an accidental drug overdose while hiking near his home in Palm Springs.

== Early life ==
Ford was born Glenn Soukesian in Pasadena, California. He was of Armenian descent through his father's side, and also had Italian, Swedish, French, and English ancestry. Ford grew up in a conservative community in Mission Viejo. His father divorced his mother when Ford was three; Ford only reconnected with his father at age sixteen. As a child, Ford learned violin and guitar and participated in musical theater.

Ford's family wanted him to be an engineer and dissuaded him from pursuing music professionally, leading him to briefly attend California State University, Fullerton for a year. Leaving school, he landed a gig in a dinner theater nightclub, where he performed show tunes, R&B, and blue-eyed soul with a group of singers. This was followed by a stint in a jazz quartet that opened for acts such as Wayland and Madame and comedian David Brenner. In 1986, Ford was picked up by a manager, but his music career failed to develop.

== Career ==
=== Pornography and modeling ===
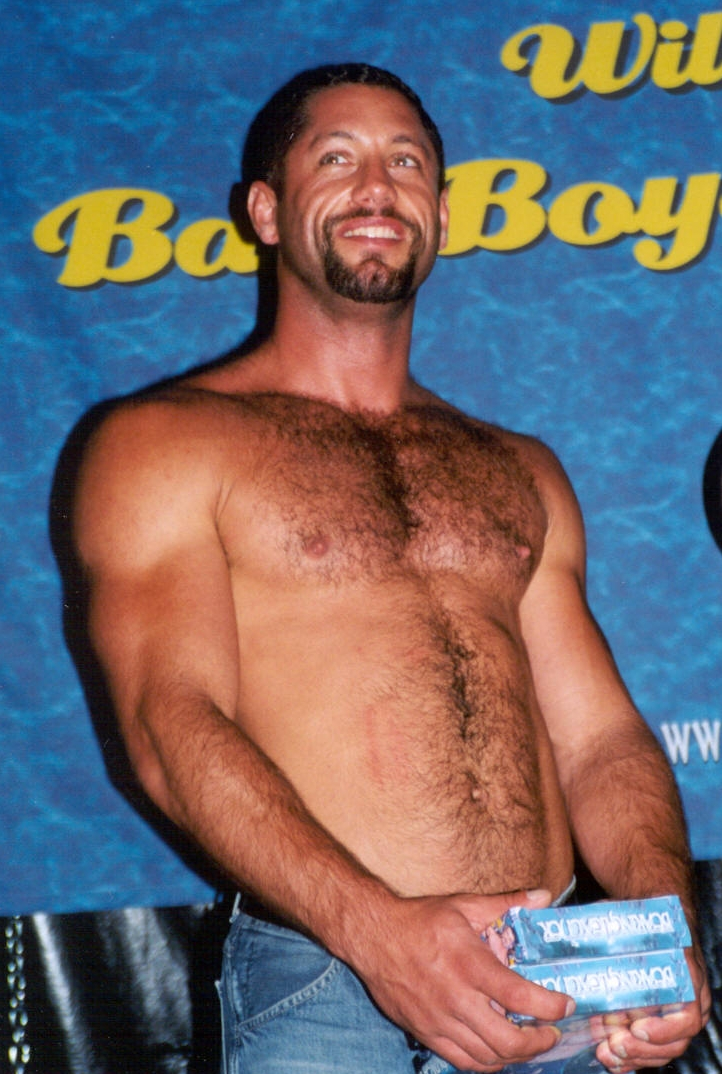
Blake Harper (pictured in 2008), Ford's then-boyfriend, introduced him to the adult film industry.

During the early 2000s, Ford, who worked as a volunteer program manager for the Wells Fargo bank, also spent two years moonlighting as a nude model. At the age of 39, he ventured into the adult film industry while dating pornographic film actor Blake Harper. When Harper's scene partner could not travel from New York City to Palm Springs due to the effects of September 11 attacks, Harper asked Ford if he would step in. Feeling unfulfilled with his corporate job and wanting to draw attention to his music, Ford accepted. Their scenes were taped and released by All Worlds Video in 2001, entitled PornStruck 2. Ford's pseudonym "Colton" was inspired by the California city he often drove through on his way to Palm Springs. The surname "Ford" was adopted on the advice of Chi Chi Larue, who suggested a name as strong as a car brand.

Ford signed exclusively with All Worlds in December 2001 and made twelve pornographic videos within a 10-month period before retiring the following year. He and Harper also briefly worked as webcam models. Ford's videos made him very popular with audiences, with commentators stating he was "built for porn superstardom", and "took the gay porn world by storm". He garnered several accolades in his adult film career. In 2003, he shared the GayVN Award for Gay Performer of the Year with actor Michael Brandon. His group scene in Conquered (2001), a video directed by LaRue, received a GayVN Award nomination and won a Grabby Award. It was also recognized by the Hard Choice Award as one of the year's best sex scenes. Ford received a Grabby nomination for Best Performer in 2002, and two more GayVN Awards nominations for his collaboration in Aftershock: Part 2 (2002) and Prowl 3 (2003). Ford himself noted that his muscular look set him apart from many other performers at the time. He also credited his success to Harper and LaRue, stating that working with them made him feel safe and comfortable.

In July 2002, Ford decided to leave the industry to refocus on his musical ambitions. He asserted that his foray into the adult film industry was nothing to be ashamed of and offered him both a larger audience and unique advantages. "I felt that I had gotten everything out of the experience that I needed and that it was time to move on and shift gears," he recalled. He retained the pseudonym Colton Ford for his music releases. Ford remained active in modeling years after his retirement; for instance, he was included in Joe Oppedisano's explicit photobook Uncensored (2008). In December 2010, Ford was featured on the cover of Attitude magazine's Sex Issue, one of eleven prominent male porn stars to pose for it. In 2021, at 58 years of age, Ford launched an OnlyFans page. He closed his account three years later, finding content creation too demanding for his age and priorities.

=== Music ===
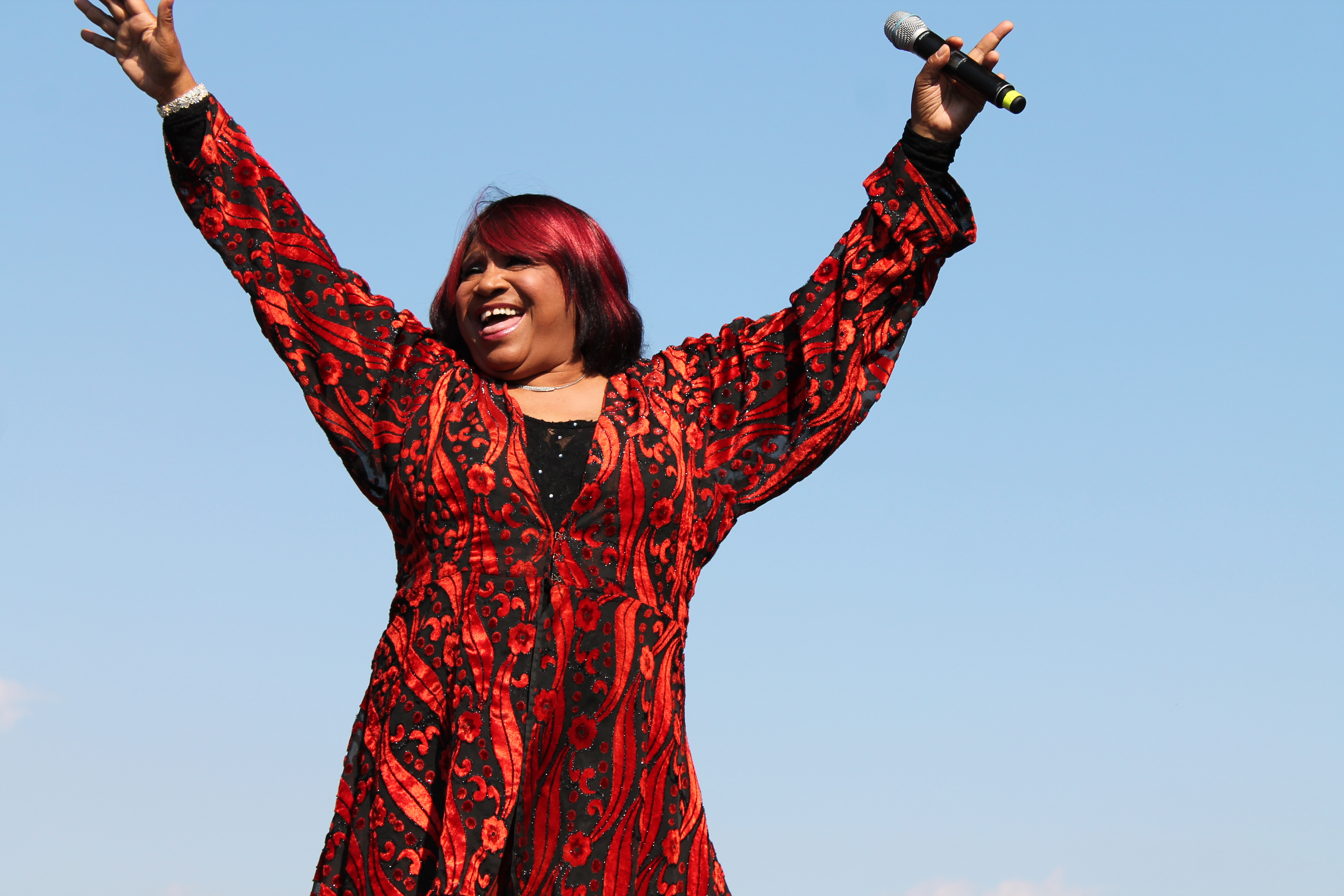
In 2004, Ford collaborated with American singer Pepper MaShay (pictured in 2012) on the cover "Signed, Sealed, Delivered", which peaked at number 9 on the Billboard Hot Dance Club Play.

In 1986, Ford moved to Los Angeles, where he joined Jon St. James' production company, performing with artists such as Keith Sweat and Chaka Khan. Under the pseudonym Glenn Street, he released the technopop single "Hardline" through On the Spot Records in 1988. By 1990, he signed with Mighty Productions, leading to a collaboration with American DJ Frankie Knuckles. Although Ford was slated to be featured on Knuckles' 1995 album, Welcome to the Real World, the plans were scrapped and Adeva ultimately took his role on the project. Further music deals, including one with Virgin in 1999 and another with Third Stone Records, also fell through. At 39 years old, believing he was no longer "label material", Ford ventured into adult films with Harper in 2001 to garner more attention for his music.

Ford returned to his music career in 2003 with the release of "Everything", a dance-oriented single. Following this, Ford collaborated with singer-songwriter Pepper MaShay on "Signed, Sealed, Delivered" (2004), a house-influenced cover of Stevie Wonder's 1970 single. The single reached number 9 on the Billboard Hot Dance Club Play chart in April 2004 and number 25 on the Hot Dance Singles Sales chart the following month.

Ford signed with Outsider Music and released his debut album, Tug of War (2008), featuring house, pop, and R&B influences. The tracks were written and composed by Ford and record producer Quentin Harris. Billboard called the album "a steel-solid second act", while Metro Weekly offered more mixed reviews but stated that "Ford’s voice is actually better than, or at least as good as, many of today’s pop stars". Three singles were released from the album, each featuring a music video: "Tug of War", "That's Me" (featuring Cazwell), and "The Way You Love Me". His second studio album, Under the Covers (2009), featured dance covers of songs from a variety of genres. Daniel Villarreal of Queerty and the writers of Dallas Voice dismissed the generic and dated production on Under the Covers.

Released in June 2013, Ford's third album, The Way I Am, incorporated a blend of dance, electronica, and R&B. He collaborated with producers such as Chris Willis and NERVO on the album, which Lopez and Raj Rudolph of EQ Music viewed as an improvement over Ford's previous releases. The album's uptempo lead single, "Let Me Live Again", reached number 41 on the Billboard Dance Club Songs chart. Ford subsequently released his EP Next Chapter in 2015. In 2016, Ford relocated from New York City to Los Angeles and departed from his management company. That same year, he released Glenn Soukesian, an R&B and soul album he considered a personal project. Ford temporarily stepped away from his music career, before returning in 2020 with the four-song EP Unity, which he wrote during the COVID-19 pandemic. His fifth and final album, Permission, was released in 2023.

=== Film, television, and theater ===
Before his pornography career, Ford made a brief appearance in the LGBT-related feature film The Next Best Thing (2000). Later, Ford's shift from adult film back to music was chronicled in Christopher Long's 2005 film, Naked Fame. The film was screened at various festivals in 2004 followed by a limited theatrical run in 2005. Kurt B. Reighley of The Advocate provided a mixed review, noting that the chemistry between Ford and Harper compensated for the film's uneven pacing and cinematography. Ford appeared in a cameo role as Butch Hunk, an escort hired for a threesome, in Another Gay Sequel: Gays Gone Wild! (2008).

From 2007 to 2009, Ford featured on the vampire series The Lair, where he played the closeted Sheriff Trout. Fred Olen Ray, the show's creator, intentionally wrote the role to be nonsexual. Sheriff Trout's role was expanded in the second season, with Ford also portraying the character in the series' third and final season in 2009. In 2011, Ford debuted off-Broadway in Little House on the Ferry, a musical centered on a gay love story at the Fire Island summer resort. A year later, Ford participated in the New York production of Match Game Live, a staged version of the popular TV game show. In 2014, Ford starred as a gay partner in the Los Angeles production of Harrison David Rivers' And All The Dead, Lie Down.

== Artistry and public image ==
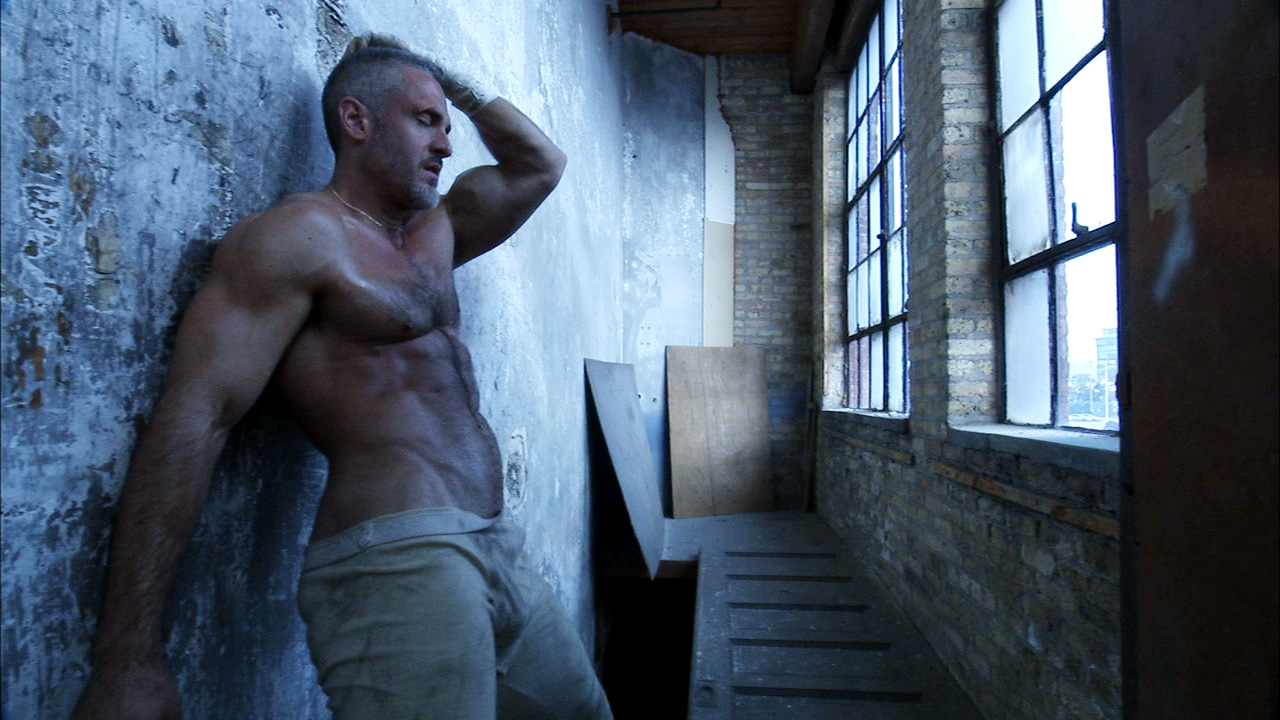
Ford during the video shoot for his single "That's Me" in October 2007. He was known to incorporate homoerotic elements in his music videos.

Ford is considered one of the most popular gay pornographic stars of the early 2000s. He was known for his distinct "muscle daddy" image, with Lopez stating that "Ford is to gay porn muscle-daddies what Meryl Streep is to mainstream movie actresses". Cybersocket stated that he "made an indelible imprint in the industry" with his masculine image. Pink TV declared him one of the world's most famous American gay personalities. He was included in OutQ's Top 100 artists list in 2005.

Coverage of Ford's subsequent music career frequently mentioned the fame earned from his time in the adult film industry. Cameron Scheetz of Queerty commented that despite some success as a performer in the gay club scene, Ford had difficulty breaking through into the mainstream. As a musician, he was most well-known for his dance music, a genre he favored for its resonance with the gay community and being welcoming for artists outside major labels. Although Ford naturally spoke in a baritone, his singing voice spanned a tenor range. Several journalists wrote positively of Ford's voice in their reviews, including Doug Rule of Metro Weekly and J. Poet of Gay.com.

A self-proclaimed exhibitionist, Ford was known to incorporate homoerotic elements in his music videos. The black and white video for "Let Me Live Again" drew inspiration from Tom of Finland's artwork, while in "Handle It", he appears as one of the go-go boys at a gay nightclub. Suggestive content can also be found in the videos for "The Way You Love Me", "Losing My Religion", "All My Love", and "Stay".

== Personal life and death ==
Ford's parents accepted both his homosexuality and his pornography career. His mother died from cancer in 2013 at the age of 69. Beyond his entertainment career, Ford had been a personal trainer since 2002, training clients at a local gym in Palm Springs until his death in 2025. Ford started dating Blake Harper in 2001, a pairing Brady Jansen of AVN described as "arguably the biggest gay porn power couple ever." Their relationship, as Adams observed, was instrumental in elevating both men to A-list status within the industry. Ford stated that despite public perceptions of pornographic actors, he and Harper were "two down-to-earth, genuine guys who are just trying to figure life out". They split in April 2007 when Ford moved to New York to pursue his entertainment career, while Harper returned to Canada. In August 2024, Ford dated his Aftershock: Part 2 co-star, Matthew Rush.

On May 18, 2025, Ford was last seen before embarking on a hike on the Goat Trails in Palm Springs, California. The following day, May 19, Palm Springs police received a report of a missing hiker. Later that evening, Ford, aged 62, was found deceased on the hiking trail. The coroner's office ruled out foul play, but no information on the possible cause of death was made available. Although the coroner's office did not release the man's identity, friends and colleagues confirmed Ford's identity and paid tribute to him to multiple outlets and on social media, including LaRue, Steele, and Matthew Rettenmund. In September, it was announced that he died of an accidental drug overdose caused by MDMA intoxication. Toxicology reports also found MDA and betaphenethylamine in his system, with hypertrophic cardiomyopathy cited as a significant contributing factor. A celebration of his life was held on July 5 at the Palm Springs Cultural Center.

== Filmography ==
=== Pornographic ===
Title	Year	Studio	Directors	Ref.
Conquered	2001	All Worlds Video	Chi Chi LaRue	
PornStruck 2	2001	All Worlds Video	Doug Jeffries	
Aftershock: Part 1	2002	Mustang	Chi Chi LaRue	
Aftershock: Part 2	2002	Mustang	Chi Chi LaRue	
Head Games	2002	Mustang	Chi Chi LaRue	
Bearing Leather	2002	All Worlds Video	Doug Jeffries	
Bringing Out Brother	2002	All Worlds Video	Doug Jeffries	
Colton	2002	All Worlds Video	Chi Chi LaRue	
Closed Set: The New Crew	2002	MSR Videos	Joe Gage	
Prowl 3: Genuine Leather	2003	MSR Videos	Tony Alizzi	
Gang Bang Café	2003	Men of Odyssey	Chi Chi LaRue	
Still Untamed	2003	All Worlds Video	Chi Chi LaRue	
Dallas Steele and Colton Ford: Two Porn Legends Together	2023	RawFuckClub	Dallas Steele	

=== Non-pornographic ===
Year	Title	Role	Notes	Ref.
2000	The Next Best Thing	Glen	Feature film	
2004	Naked Fame	Himself	Documentary film	
2004	Hellbent	Nickname Band Member, uncredited	Feature film	
2008	Another Gay Sequel: Gays Gone Wild!	Butch Hunk	Feature film	
2008	"Into the Nightlife"	–	Music video	
2007–2009	The Lair	Sheriff Trout	TV series, 28 episodes	
2019	The (Art) Of Be(i)ng	–	Feature film	

== Discography ==
=== Albums ===
List of studio albums
Title	Album details
Tug of War	Released: February 19, 2007; Label: Outsider Music; Formats: Digital download, CD
Under the Covers	Released: September 1, 2009; Label: Peace Bisquit; Formats: Digital download, CD
The Way I Am	Released: June 18, 2013; Label: Independent; Formats: Digital download, streaming, CD
Glenn Soukesian	Released: March 30, 2016; Label: Independent; Formats: Digital download, streaming
Permission	Released: June 6, 2023; Label: Independent; Formats: Digital download, streaming

=== Extended plays ===
List of extended plays
Title	Album details
Next Chapter	Released: December 4, 2014; Label: Independent; Formats: Digital download, streaming
Let Me Live Again / The Music Always Gets You Back	Released: November 11, 2011; Labels: Peace Bisquit / Woop Woop; Formats: Digital download, streaming
Unity	Released: November 21, 2020; Labels: Independent; Formats: Digital download, streaming

=== Singles ===
List of singles, showing chart positions and selected albums
Title	Year	Peak chart positions		Album
Title	Year	US Dance	US Dance Sales	Album
"Everything"	2003	–	–	Naked Fame
"Signed, Sealed, Delivered" (featuring Pepper MaShay)	2004	9	25	Naked Fame
"The Way You Love Me"	2007	–	–	Tug of War
"Tug of War (My Heart Won't Let Go)"	2008	–		Tug of War
"That's Me" (featuring Cazwell)	2008	–	–	Tug of War
"Trouble"	2009	–	–	Under the Covers
"Losing My Religion"	2009	–	–	Under the Covers
"Let Me Live Again"	2011	41	–	Non-album single
"Look My Way"	2014	–	–	The Way I Am
"Will I Ever Be"	2017	–	–	Non-album single
"Stronger"	2020	–	–	Unity
"Stay"	2021	–	–	Unity
"Unity"	2021	–	–	Unity
"The Way"	2022	–	–	Non-album single
"Handle It"	2023	–	–	Permission

== Theatre ==
- 2012: Little House on the Ferry
- 2014: And All the Dead, Lie Down
- 2019: Match Game Live

== Awards ==
Year	Nominee / work	Award	Result
2001	Conquered	Hard Choice Award for The Year's Best Sex (Note: Shared with Blake Harper.)	Won
2002	Conquered	Grabby Award for Best Group Sex Scene (Note: Shared with Nino Bacci, Blake Harper, Billy Herrington, and Jay Ross.)	Won
2002	Conquered	GayVN Award for Best Group Scene	Nominated
2002	Colton Ford	Grabby Awards for Best Performer	Nominated
2002	Colton Ford	Mr. All Worlds Bear	Won
2003	Colton Ford	GayVN Awards for Gay Performer of the Year (Note: Tied with Michael Brandon.)	Won
2003	Prowl 3	GayVN Awards for Best Sex Scene	Nominated
2004	Aftershock: Part 2	GayVN Award for Best Group Scene (Note: Shared with Matthew Rush, Blake Harper, Joe Foster, Chad Hunt, Chris Steele, Bret Wolfe, Peter Raeg, Cody Wolf, Jake Marshall, Jim Slade, and Antonio Majors.)	Nominated

== See also ==
- List of male performers in gay porn films
- List of house music artists
- List of people on the cover of Attitude magazine
- List of Armenian Americans
