= Somebody to Love (Leighton Meester song) =

Single by Leighton Meester featuring Robin Thicke
- Released: October 14, 2009
- Genre: Synth-pop; R&B
- Length: 3:32
- Label: Universal Republic
- Songwriters: Leighton Meester; Robin Thicke; Mike Caren; Ollie Goldstein; Rico Love; Shahine Ezell
- Producer: Mike Caren

Leighton Meester singles chronology
"Good Girls Go Bad" (2009)	"Somebody to Love" (2009)	"Your Love's a Drug" (2010)

Robin Thicke singles chronology
"Dreamworld" (2009)	"Somebody to Love" (2009)	"Sex Therapy" (2009)

Music video
- "Somebody to Love" on YouTube

"Somebody to Love" is a song by American actress and singer Leighton Meester featuring American singer Robin Thicke. Written by Meester, Thicke, Mike Caren, Ollie Goldstein, Rico Love and Shahine Ezell, and produced by Caren, the song was released as Meester's debut single on October 14, 2009, by Universal Republic Records.

The song was featured in the ninth episode of the third season of the television series Gossip Girl (in which Meester starred as Blair Waldorf), titled "They Shoot Humphreys, Don't They?" and originally aired November 9, 2009. It is also included on the soundtrack to the 2010 film Valentine's Day.

== Composition ==
"Somebody to Love" is a midtempo electropop song that combines Meester's "pop-electronica vibe" with Thicke's "smooth R&B stylings". The track contains a synth-driven sing-along chorus, and was said to "[hark] back to Madonna's early-'90s dance music". Meester told MTV News that the song is "basically about how I can't get any—I can't find anyone to love." In an interview for On Air with Ryan Seacrest on October 13, 2009—where the song was premiered—Meester said, "I really wanted to make something that's completely different from anything that's on the radio right now. I feel like it's really dancy and fun, but it's still laid back and relaxed and moody and sexy." Of the single, songwriter Love told MTV News, "I was honored when I found out that my record was chosen to be Leighton's first single. It's exciting to be able to show a different side of my work and me."

== Critical reception ==
Sarah MacRory of Billboard described the song as "a carefully constructed ode to vintage Madonna—particularly in its 'Vogue'-like verses, where Meester semi-raps rather than sings. The lyrics are lovelorn, as she celebrates her jet-setter lifestyle but also mourns her inability to settle down." She noted Thicke's cameo as "[t]he song's high point", as he "delivers a catchy chorus that cries out for a sped-up dance remix." Pitchfork's Stephen M. Deusner, however, gave it a mixed review, praising Meester's "sleepy/sexy delivery" but criticizing her "very narrow" vocal range and her "[mangling of] simple French pronunciation", referring to her pronunciation of the French phrase "Je t'adore" ("I adore you").

== Music video ==
The music video was directed by Zoe Cassavetes and filmed in New York City in October 2009. A preview of the video was first shown during the November 2, 2009, episode of Gossip Girl, with the full-length video being launched on CWTV.com on November 9 immediately after its broadcast on The CW Network. Meester explained the concept of the video, saying, "I want it to be telling a story. But a lot about the photography and the lighting, and mostly about the clothes." Meester added to MTV News, "It's basically going through ... a sexy day in my life. We start off in the car, we come in, I keep on fantasizing and dreaming that I'm with somebody I can love. He [Thicke] kind of comes and goes."

The video is about finding love in a world consumed with fleeting lust and one-night stands. It consists mostly of shots of Meester in the back of a limousine in the city at night and posing on a couch. It is intercut with scenes of Meester fantasizing about hooking up with Thicke inside an elevator and in her apartment, as well as scenes of Thicke performing his parts of the song. It also includes cameo appearances by Laker Girl Vanessa Curry and one of the song's writers, Shahine Ezell.

== Promotion ==
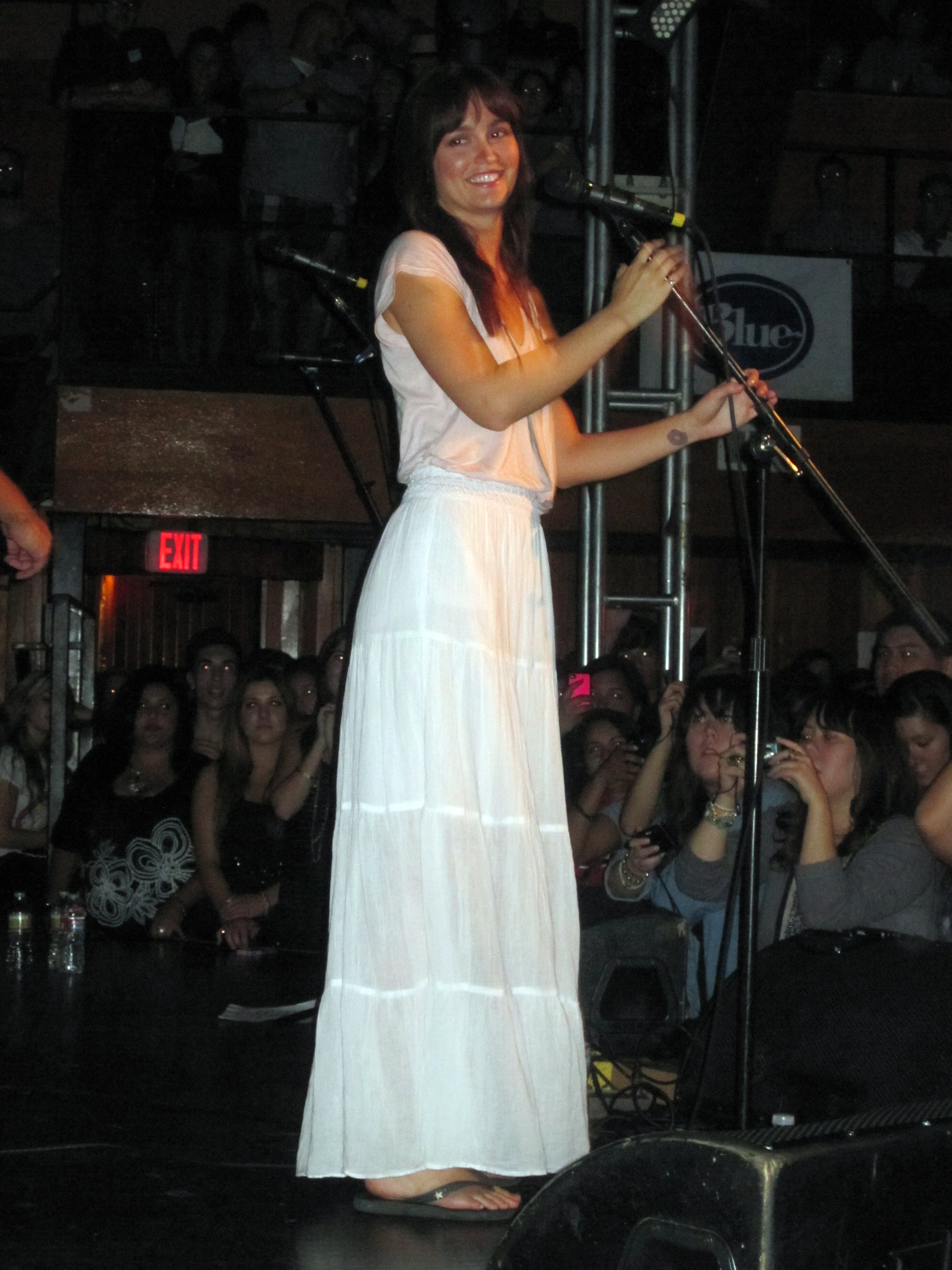
Meester performing "Somebody to Love" at The Troubadour in West Hollywood, California, on June 13, 2011

Meester performed "Somebody to Love" live for the first time on It's On with Alexa Chung on November 24, 2009.

== Charts ==
Chart performance for "Somebody to Love"
Chart (2009–2010)	Peak position
US Bubbling Under Hot 100 (Billboard)	11
US Heatseekers Songs (Billboard)	13

== Release history ==
Release history and formats for "Somebody to Love"
Region	Date	Format	Ref.
Canada	October 14, 2009	Digital download	
United States	October 14, 2009	Digital download	
Australia	October 16, 2009	Digital download	
France	October 16, 2009	Digital download	
Germany	October 16, 2009	Digital download	
United States	October 26, 2009	Contemporary hit radio	
