= Heartstrings (Leighton Meester song) =

Single by Leighton Meester

from the album Heartstrings
- Released: September 9, 2014
- Genre: Dream pop; Indie pop
- Length: 3:34
- Label: Vagrant Records; Hotly Wanting
- Songwriter: Jeff Trott

'Heartstrings' is a song by American singer-songwriter and actress Leighton Meester. It was the first single from her debut album, Heartstrings on September 9, 2014 via iTunes and SoundCloud. The song was written by Meester, and produced by Jeff Trott. On October 17, 2014, Meester performed "Heartstrings" on Big Morning Buzz Live.

== Music video ==
The music video for Heartstrings was released on October 29, 2014.
