= Ryan Petersen =

American musician

- Origin: Los Angeles
- Genres: Rock, pop, country
- Occupations: Producer, songwriter

Ryan Petersen is a Grammy-winning producer/songwriter/multi-instrumentalist who works out of both Los Angeles and Nashville. Some of the artists he has collaborated with include Switchfoot, Simple Plan, Matt Stell and Leighton Meester. He produced music for the hit NBC/Universal show Parenthood and appeared in 7 episodes. He is currently producing and writing music for the hit CW TV show Riverdale.

== Selected discography ==
Artist	Album	Credit
Switchfoot	Hello Hurricane	Engineering
Matt Stell	Better Than That EP	Songwriting - "I Love You Too"
The McClymonts	Wrapped Up Good	Engineering/Digital Editing
Jonas Brothers	Jonas L.A.	Producing, Mixing, Engineering
Simple Plan	Get Your Heart On!	Songwriting - "Jet Lag"
The Summer Set	Everything's Fine	Songwriting - "Begin Again"
Tyler Bryant & The Shakedown	From The Sand Castle	Songwriting - "Say A Prayer"
Hedley	Storms	Songwriting - "Hot Mess"
Hedley	Wild Life	Songwriting - "Headphones"
This Providence	Brier	Songwriting - "Deep End"
Kris Allen	Thank You Camellia	Songwriting - "Love's Me Not"
Cody Simpson	Surfer's Paradise	Songwriting/Producing - "Summertime Of Our Lives"
Avenged Sevenfold	Hail To The King	Digital Editing
Simple Plan	Get Your Heart On - The Second Coming!	Songwriting/Additional Production - "The Rest Of Us"
Better Than Ezra	All Together Now	Songwriting - "Crazy Lucky" & "Gonna Get Better"
Scars on 45	Safety In Numbers	Songwriting - "Higher And Higher"
Leighton Meester	Heartstrings	Songwriting - "Heartstrings", "L.A." & "Sweet"
Sinclair	Sweet Talk EP	Songwriting - "World Is Ours", & "Heaven On Earth"
Machineheart	In Your Dreams EP	Songwriting - "Watercolors"
Rachel Platten	Wildfire	Songwriting - "Lonely Planet"
