= Shamita Siva =

Bruneian actress

- Born: Brunei
- Other names: Shamita Sivabalan
- Occupation: Actress
- Years active: 2018–present

Shamita Siva is a Malaysian actress. She is best known for playing Sarika Ray in Good Cop/Bad Cop and Ange in Single, Out.

== Early life ==
Siva was born in [Malaysia]. She has said she had a third culture kid upbringing. She started dancing at the age of 4. She cites her mother who was a Latin dancer as her main influence. She attended Monash University.

== Career ==
Her first appearance on television came in a short film called Cynation: Dancing Devil where she played a Blade Dancer. Her biggest role to date is playing Sarika in Good Cop/Bad Cop starring Leighton Meester. The week she auditioned she had also auditioned for 5 other shows. Another popular role that Siva is known for is as Ange in Single, Out. She was the first lesbian character on the show. She loves action movies and hopes to act in a horror or sci-fi movie.

== Personal life ==
Siva is Bisexual

== Filmography ==
=== Film ===
Year	Title	Role	Notes
2018	Cynation: Dancing Devil	Blade Dancer	Short
2018	Love Automated	Alicia	Short
2018	An Artist, Young	Phoenix	Short
2020	Written in the Stars	Sara	
2021	The Bistro		Short
2021	Someone Else	Katie	Short
2021	Bleed Australian	Tahlia	Short
2023	Foe	VIP 3	
2023	Dead Lesbians	Katherine	Short
2024	Twin Flame	Kali	Short
2024	Dashboard Dogs	Kya	

=== Television ===
Year	Title	Role	Notes
2019	Feedback	Captain	Episodes: "Playing"
2023	SugarHope Records	Xena Rai Dancer	Episode: "The Bad Boys of 6 O'Clock"
2025	Good Cop/Bad Cop	Sarika Ray	8 episodes
2025	Single, Out	Ange	6 episodes
