= Jess Bond =

American film director (born 1986)

Jessica Anne Bond (born Jessica Manafort, June 13, 1982) is an American film director, screenwriter and producer.

== Career ==
In 2007, Bond directed the film Remember the Daze starring Amber Heard, Brie Larson, and Leighton Meester. The film premiered at the 2007 Los Angeles Film Festival under the title The Beautiful Ordinary.

Bond's follow up film Rosy was released on Hulu in 2018. Stacy Martin plays an actress and Nat Wolff as a man obsessed with her. The film also starred Tony Shalhoub, Johnny Knoxville, and Sky Ferreira. Jonathan Schwartz and Alex Bach produced.

== Personal life ==
Bond is the daughter of American lobbyist and campaign manager Paul Manafort. From 2013 to 2017, she was married to real estate developer Jeffrey Yohai. In 2018, Bond announced she was changing her last name both professionally and legally from Manafort to her mother's maiden name, Bond, in order to distance herself from her father after his conviction. She is quoted saying “I am a passionate liberal and a registered Democrat and this has been difficult for me. Although I am ‘the daughter of,’ I am very much my own person and hopefully people can realize that.”

== Filmography ==
- Remember the Daze (2007) as Jess Bond
- Rosy (2018) (directed)
