= GCBC =

GCBC is an abbreviation that may refer to:

- Girton College Boat Club, the rowing club of Girton College at Cambridge University in England
- Good Cop/Bad Cop, a character in The LEGO Movie
- Grey College Boat Club, the rowing club of Grey College at Durham University in England
