= Panawathi Girl =

Australian musical

- Music: David Milroy
- Lyrics: David Milroy
- Book: David Milroy
- Setting: Chubb Springs, North West Australia; 1969
- Productions: ? Bunbury; 2022 Perth
- Awards: Performing Arts WA Award for Outstanding New Work – Musical & Opera

Panawathi Girl is an Australian musical by David Milroy. Set in 1969, the musical concerns a young Aboriginal woman Molly Chubb returning from university studies in Perth to Chubb Springs, her small country hometown in the northwest of Western Australia, to connect with her family and culture.

== Productions ==
An earlier version of the work titled Rodeo Moon was workshopped at the Western Australian Academy of Performing Arts in 2015.

Following a short season in Bunbury, Panawathi Girl was performed at His Majesty's Theatre in Perth from 8–13 February 2022, presented by Yirra Yaakin and the Perth Festival. The cast included Lila McGuire (Molly), Peter Docker (Chubb), Chris Isaacs (Ron), Grace Chow (Beth), Manuao TeAotonga (JoJo), Angelica Lockyer (Pansy), Wimiya Woodley (Billy), Teresa Rose (Ada), Gus Noakes (Knuckles), Luke Hewitt (Gough Whitlam), Geoff Kelso (John Gorton), Nadia Martich and Maitland Schnaars. The production was directed by Eva Grace Mullaley and choreographed by Janine Oxenham, with musical direction by Wayne Freer, set design by Bruce McKinven, costume design by Lynn Ferguson and lighting design by Lucy Birkinshaw.

== Reception ==
Panawathi Girl received very favourable critical reception. The Guardian concluded that "brimming with heart and humour, Panawathi Girl is a wildly entertaining glimpse into an era of great optimism and change, prompting us to consider how far, or how little, we’ve come in the last 50 years". Limelight, in a five-star review, noted that "it occupies the same artistic space as Jimmy Chi’s musicals Bran Nue Dae and Corrugation Road and there is every reason to assume that Panawathi Girl will become a great classic".

The musical received two 2023 Performing Arts WA Awards including Outstanding New Work – Musical & Opera for Milroy and Outstanding Ensemble – Musical & Opera. Its nominations, nine in total, also included Best Production – Musical & Opera and Outstanding Composition or Arranging.

== Original cast ==
| Character | Actor |
|---|---|
| Molly Panawathi | Lila McGuire |
| Gough Whitlam | Luke Hewitt |
| John Gorton | Geoff Kelso |
| Chubb | Peter Docker |
| Pansy | Angelica Lockyer |
| Billy | Wimiya Woodley |
| Ada | Teresa Rose |
| Buckley | Maitland Schnaars |
| Ron | Chris Isaacs |
| Jojo | Manuao TeAotonga |
| Beth | Grace Chow |
| Knuckles | Gus Noakes |
| Unknown | Nadia Martich |

== Musical numbers ==
- "The Land of the Long White Sock" – John Gorton and Gough Whitlam
- "The Fire is Burning" – Molly, Ada, and Pansy
- "Rodeo Moon" – Knuckles
- "Shadow in the Dark"
