= Chandra West =

Canadian actress

- Born: December 31, 1970 (age 55); Edmonton, Alberta, Canada
- Occupation: Actress
- Years active: 1991–present
- Spouse: Mark Tinker (m. 2005)

Chandra K. West (born December 31, 1970) is a Canadian actress.

== Early life and education ==
West was born in Edmonton, Alberta, the youngest of eight children. The family moved to Oak Bay, British Columbia, where she attended Monterey Elementary for three years. The family moved to Oakville, Ontario, where West spent the majority of her youth. When she was 17, West attended a summer acting camp located in Oxford, England. She later went on to study in the Theater Performance Program at Concordia University in Montreal, Quebec.

== Career ==
West's career began in 1991 when she played a small part in the film True Confections, a 1950s conservative drama about a woman with an ahead-of-her-time awareness. West followed her screen debut with a smaller role in the 1993 miniseries The Secrets of Lake Success.

West appeared in three consecutive films; the first as the female-lead in Puppet Master 4 (1993), then a smaller role as Miss Germany in the action film No Contest (1994) also starring Robert Davi and Roddy Piper, and in the same year, reprising her role as Susie in Puppet Master 5: The Final Chapter (1994). The closing months of 1994 and most of 1995 saw West return to television with appearances in Madonna: Innocence Lost (1994), Catwalk (1995), Falling for You (1995) and the role of Mariel Hemingway in Love and Betrayal: The Mia Farrow Story (1995).

Her other film roles of the late 1990s include Veronica Roberts in Universal Soldier II: Brothers in Arms (1998) and Universal Soldier III: Unfinished Business (1998).

Her film breakthrough came when she starred as Val Kilmer's wife in the 2002 D. J. Caruso crime thriller, The Salton Sea. Following the moderate success of The Salton Sea, West was exposed to a wider market. This role helped her obtain the role of Robin in The First $20 Million Is Always the Hardest, which was panned critically and deemed a major disappointment despite an all-star cast that included Rosario Dawson and Adam Garcia and a script penned by Jon Favreau.

Her next role was as Laura Chandler in the Emmy-nominated mini-series Mister Sterling (2003). From 2003-2004 she portrayed Dr. Jennifer Devlin, girlfriend of John Clark Jr. (Mark-Paul Gosselaar) in a recurring role on NYPD Blue. She played the wife of Michael Keaton in the 2005 horror film White Noise. She also played novice agent Holly Gribbs in the pilot of CSI: Crime Scene Investigation in 2000. West's more recent performances were in the film Canes (later retitled The Covenant: Brotherhood of Evil), which also starred Edward Furlong and Michael Madsen, and as Tina Blake in the HBO series John From Cincinnati. In 2006, West played the lead character Tracy in the film The Last Trimester. In 2007 she played "Dr. Honey" in the movie I Now Pronounce You Chuck and Larry. In 2009, she starred as the object of a revenge seeking neighbor in the TV movie My Neighbor's Secret.

West had a lead role in the ABC supernatural drama television series The Gates, which premiered in June 2010.

In 2011, she appeared in the made-for-TV movie Burn Notice: The Fall of Sam Axe, based on the television series Burn Notice.

== Filmography ==
=== Film ===
| Year | Title | Role | Notes |
|---|---|---|---|
| 1991 | True Confections | Carol | |
| 1993 | Puppet Master 4 | Susie | direct-to-video |
| 1994 | Puppet Master 5: The Final Chapter | Susie | direct-to-video |
| 1995 | Night Terrors | Beth | |
| 1995 | No Contest | Maria, Miss Germany | |
| 1999 | Something More | Kelly | |
| 2000 | The Perfect Son | Sarah Parker | |
| 2002 | The Salton Sea | Liz | |
| 2002 | The First $20 Million Is Always the Hardest | Robin | |
| 2003 | Water's Edge | Molly Graves | |
| 2005 | White Noise | Anna Rivers | |
| 2005 | The Long Weekend | Kim | |
| 2006 | Canes, retitled The Covenant: Brotherhood of Evil | Lisa Goodman | |
| 2006 | The Tooth Fairy | Darcy Wagner | direct-to-video |
| 2007 | I Now Pronounce You Chuck and Larry | Dr. Honey | |
| 2007 | Badland | Oli Danilou | |
| 2012 | Hidden Moon | Monica Brighton | |
| 2014 | Christmas Tail | Maggie McPhail | |
| 2019 | Z | Georgia Cadere | |
| 2019 | Spiral | Tiffany | |

=== Television ===
| Year | Title | Role | Notes |
|---|---|---|---|
| 1990 | The Hitchhiker | Girl at Club | Episode: "Strate Shooter" |
| 1992 | Beyond Reality | Amanda | Episode: "Master of Darkness" |
| 1992 | Forever Knight | Report | Episode: "Dying to Know You" |
| 1993 | The Secrets of Lake Success | Jenny Grayson | 3 episodes TV miniseries |
| 1994 | Lonesome Dove: The Series | Dancing Girl | Episode: "Last Stand" |
| 1994 | Highlander: The Series | Donna | Episode: "Line of Fire" |
| 1994 | Madonna: Innocence Lost | Kelsey Lee | TV movie |
| 1994 | Catwalk | Wendy | Unknown episodes |
| 1995 | Road to Avonlea | Greta Steig | Episode: "Comings and Goings" |
| 1995 | Falling for You | Julie | TV movie |
| 1995 | Love and Betrayal: The Mia Farrow Story | Mariel Hemingway | TV movie |
| 1995 | Picket Fences | Tina Hunnecker | Episode: "Heart of Saturday Night" |
| 1995 | Pointman | Brigid O'Connor | Episode: "Here She Comes, Miss Murder" |
| 1996 | A Face to Die For | Sheila Gilmore | TV movie |
| 1996 | Kindred: The Embraced | Grace Dugan | Episode: "Live Hard, Die Young... and Leave a Good Looking Corpse" |
| 1996 | Viper | Becky | Episode: "Standoff" |
| 1997 | Moment of Truth: Into the Arms of Danger | Carly Astin | TV movie |
| 1998 | Universal Soldier II: Brothers in Arms | Veronica Roberts | Television film |
| 1998 | Universal Soldier III: Unfinished Business | Veronica Roberts | Television film |
| 1999 | Seasons of Love | Lucille | 2 episodes |
| 1999 | Revenge of the Land | Ceilidh Carmichael | TV movie |
| 1999 | Earth: Final Conflict | Erica Vosser | 2 episodes |
| 2000 | The David Cassidy Story | Sue Shifrin | TV movie |
| 2000 | The '70s | Elizabeth | TV movie |
| 2000 | Life in a Day | Jasmine | TV movie |
| 2000 | CSI: Crime Scene Investigation | Holly Gribbs | 2 episodes |
| 2001 | The Waiting Game | Sarah Frazer | TV movie |
| 2001 | Jack & Jill | Sarah Weyman | 4 episodes |
| 2003 | Then Came Jones | Susan | TV movie |
| 2003 | Mister Sterling | Laura Chandler | 8 episodes |
| 2003-2004 | NYPD Blue | Dr. Jennifer Devlin | 13 episodes |
| 2004 | Dead Lawyers | Elaine | TV movie |
| 2004 | Wild Card | Carmen | Episode: "Wham Bam, Thank You Dan" |
| 2004 | Category 6: Day of Destruction | Rebecca Kerns | TV miniseries |
| 2005 | FBI: Negotiator | Elizabeth Moss | TV movie |
| 2007 | The Last Trimester | Tracy | TV movie |
| 2007 | John from Cincinnati | Tina Blake | 7 episodes |
| 2008 | Flashpoint | Rebecca Kessfield | Episode: "Asking for Flowers" |
| 2008 | Imaginary Bitches | Chandra | Episode: "Three Bitches Is an Imaginary Crowd: Part 2" |
| 2008 | For the Love of Grace | Grace Harlen | TV movie |
| 2008 | Of Murder and Memory | Theresa Nichol | TV movie |
| 2008-2009 | 90210 | Gail McKinney | 3 episodes |
| 2009 | Eleventh Hour | Angie Parks | Episode: "Eternal" |
| 2009 | My Neighbor's Secret | Casey | TV movie |
| 2009 | Monk | Carolyn Walsh | Episode: "Mr. Monk and Sharona" |
| 2010 | Cold Case | Caroline Hargreave (1974) | Episode: "The Runaway Bunny" |
| 2010 | Castle | Maggie Vega | Episode: "Suicide Squeeze" |
| 2010 | The Gates | Devon | 13 episodes |
| 2011 | Burn Notice: The Fall of Sam Axe | Donna Maitland | TV movie |
| 2011 | Private Practice | Val | Episode: "What We Have Here..." |
| 2013 | Played | Detective Sergeant Rebecca Ellis | 13 episodes |
| 2014 | A Christmas Tail | Maggie McPhail | TV movie |
| 2014 | Stalker | Cynthia Walker | Episode: "Tell All" |
| 2015 | Rosewood | Kerry Conforth | Episode: "Fireflies and Fidelity" |
| 2017 | Seduced by a Stranger (or Ring of Deception) | Julie Stevens | TV movie |
| 2017 | Chicago P.D. | FBI Special Agent Jennifer Spencer | Episode: "Fork in the Road" |
