= Jeff Wachtel =

Television executive

- Education: Yale University
- Television: Murder In A Small Town, Good Cop / Bad Cop, Mr. Robot, Suits, Monk, Psych, White Collar, Royal Pains, Covert Affairs
- Website: www.future-shack.com

Jeff Wachtel is a television producer and executive. He has been President of USA Network, Universal Content Productions and NBCUniversal International Studios. He launched Future Shack Entertainment, a television production company, in 2022.

His first project at Future Shack Entertainment was Murder in a Small Town in 2024 starring Rossif Sutherland and Kristin Kreuk. He also executive produces the series Good Cop Bad Cop for the CW, Roku, the Stan Network and ITV.

Prior to his move to London, Wachtel was the Chief Content Officer for NBCU Cable Entertainment overseeing all content for NBC cable networks USA, Syfy, Bravo, Oxygen, and E!, as well as serving as President of its cable studio Universal Content Productions. Wachtel joined USA in 2001 as Executive Vice President, Original Programming. Among the series produced by UCP under him were Mr. Robot, Suits and The Sinner for USA, Girlfriends’ Guide to Divorce for Bravo, The Magicians and 12 Monkeys for Syfy, and Difficult People for Hulu. Additional series launched under Wachtel's supervision include Burn Notice, Covert Affairs, In Plain Sight, Monk, Royal Pains, Psych, White Collar, The Dead Zone and The 4400.

Before USA, Wachtel was president of Alliance Atlantis Television, supervising series and longform programming for the Canadian program supplier. In 1997, he was the Executive Producer of the first-run syndicated series Pensacola: Wings of Gold. Wachtel co-created the show while President of 3 Arts Television, a production company that partnered CBS, Sony Pictures and 3 Arts Management.

From 1990 to 1996, Wachtel was at Columbia Pictures Television, where he rose to Executive Vice President of Primetime Television, developing and launching series including Party of Five and Dawson's Creek. Before working at Columbia Pictures Television, Wachtel was Senior Vice President, Development at Orion Television and Vice President, Development, at Robert Cooper Productions.

Wachtel began his career as a theatre director and producer. He produced the first New York productions of David Mamet's works -- Sexual Perversity in Chicago and The Duck Variations.

He lives in Los Angeles with his wife, Sheryl, a professional photographer. They have two children.
