= Emily Harper =

American actress

- Born: February 16, 1978 (age 48); Cincinnati, Ohio
- Occupations: Actress, cheerleader

Emily Harper (born February 16, 1978, in Cincinnati, Ohio) is an American actress.

== Career ==
Harper starred in a Mike's Hard Lemonade commercial in 2004. Her first regular TV role was as Fancy Crane on the soap opera Passions from 2005 to 2008. She was introduced as the potential love interest of Noah Bennett (played by Dylan Fergus). She was also in the TV pilot Inside Schwartz.

Harper was also a Laker Girl (cheerleader) for the Los Angeles Lakers NBA team from 2000 until 2003.

== Filmography ==
Film and television roles
Year	Title	Role	Notes
2005–08	Passions	Fancy Crane	434 episodes
