= Lara Gilchrist =

Canadian actress

- Born: Lara Gilchrist; October 20, 1981 (age 44); Medicine Hat, Alberta, Canada
- Education: Studio 58
- Occupation: Actress
- Years active: 2004–present
- Notable credit: Fantastic Four: World's Greatest Heroes as Susan Storm / Invisible Woman

Lara Gilchrist (born October 20, 1981) is a Canadian actress.

She voiced the role of Susan Storm (Invisible Woman) in the Cartoon Network and NickToons animated TV show Fantastic Four: World's Greatest Heroes. She also provided the voice for the character Angela in the film Braver, and has appeared in TV shows such as Smallville and Battlestar Galactica. In 2011 she appeared in the Hallmark Movie Channel movie Goodnight for Justice.

She has done TV commercial voice work for the Edmonton Eskimos, Future Shop, Mothers Against Drunk Driving, Subway, and Super Seven lotteries. On stage, she has appeared in Victoria Maxwell's Life Line put on by Solo Collective, Hippies and Bolsheviks, Ramifications of a Particular Crash, True Love Lies, and Enchanted April (based on a 1992 film).

== Early life ==
Gilchrist is an alumna of Studio 58.

== Filmography ==
Year	Title	Role	Notes
2004	Smallville	Madelyn Hibbins	Episode: "Spell"
2005	Fairytale Christmas	Princess Angela (voice)	
2006	The Last Trimester	Gabby	
2006	Supernatural	Holly Parker	Episode: "Scarecrow"
2006–2010	Fantastic Four: World's Greatest Heroes	Susan Storm / Invisible Woman (voice)	Main role
2007	Bionic Woman	Carly	3 episodes
2007	Blood Ties	Helen	
2007	Exes and Ohs	Gillian	
2007	The Haunting of Sorority Row	Jena Thorne	Television film
2007	Psych	Sabrina	
2007	Stargate Atlantis	Dr. Hewston	Episode: Sunday
2007	Class of the Titans	Eris (voice)	Episode: "Applet of Discord"
2008	The Seamstress	Dina	
2008–2009	Battlestar Galactica	Paulla Schaffer	Recurring role (11 episodes)
2009	Defying Gravity	Sharon Lewis	
2010	Supernatural	Nurse Foreman	Episode: "Sam, Interrupted"
2010	Meteor Storm	Lena	
2010	The Little Prince	Euphony (voice)	Episode: "The Planet of Music"
2010	Dead Rising 2	Crystal Bailey, Survivors	
2011	Dead Rising 2: Off the Record	Crystal Bailey, Survivors (voices)	
2011	Goodnight for Justice	Kate Ramsey	
2011	And Baby Will Fall	Jody	Television film
2011	Yuconic!	Annie	6 episodes
2011	Exes & Ohs	Gillian	5 episodes
2011	Sanctuary	Cassidy Turner	Episode: "Untouchable"
2012	Astonishing X-Men	Emma Frost (voice)	3 episodes
2012	Camera Shy	Jane Coyle	
2013	Dangerous Persuasions	Kay Noble	Episode: "Highway to Hate"
2013	Murdoch Mysteries	Eustacia Stokes	Episode: "Twisted Sisters"
2013	Bates Motel	Rebecca Craig	Episode: "Ocean View"
