= Life in a Day (1999 film) =

- Directed by: Eleanor Lindo
- Written by: Rick Drew
- Produced by: Peter Lhotka
- Starring: Michael A. Goorjian; Chandra West; Linda Kash; Wayne Best; Timothy Webber; Zachary Bennett; Gerard Plunkett; Roberta Maxwell
- Cinematography: Robert Steadman
- Edited by: Robert Lower
- Music by: Schaun Tozer
- Distributed by: Paramount Pictures
- Release date: 1999
- Running time: 89 minutes
- Country: Canada
- Language: English

Life in a Day, originally titled Antidote, is a 1999 film about a baby rapidly aging due to a failed cell-accelerating experiment.

== Plot ==
Dr. Peter Hamilton works for Concord University under Dr. Leo Sardis and Dr. Carla Jennings, and has developed a serum called AccelRate. Mark Stratton, his assistant, steals a sample and injects it into the pregnant Tina Hogan. The unborn baby grows rapidly and explodes from Tina, killing her. A murder investigation, led by Chief Max Reed and Detective Ed Carlisle is soon launched, Mark becoming the primary suspect.

Peter finds the baby at his home/lab. Assisted by Charlotte "Charlie" Tanzi, he studies her as she grows from infancy to adulthood within two days, and names her Jasmine.

Peter gets phoned by the fugitive Mark, borrows Charlie's car to confront him, and demands his help with saving Jasmine. Mark reveals that Leo ordered him to conduct the experiment resulting in Tina's death, having promised that he would be set for life. Mark tells Peter to take his notes and leave, then fatally shoots himself. A landlady sees Peter departing immediately afterward.

Meanwhile, Jasmine begins developing feelings for Peter, and sneaks away to explore the outside world. Peter returns to the lab, leaves Charlie with Mark's notes, and goes out to find Jasmine. He succeeds; Jasmine tells him she wanted to look pretty for him.

Back at the lab, Peter injects Jasmine with an experimental governing agent, earlier tested on one of his rabbits; their feelings for each other deepen.

The next day, Jasmine awakes still looking youthful. She joyfully urges Peter to go out and experience life with her. Charlie offers to stay behind to continue the lab work. Later, Charlie notices that the rabbit injected with the governing agent has died.

While Peter and Jasmine are at a conservatory, Peter notices a streak of white in her hair, and decides that they should return to the lab.

Meanwhile, Charlie is confronted by Max and Ed. Max opens a drawer to discover Tina's blood-stained scarf, deepening their suspicion of Charlie and Peter. Peter and Jasmine return to see Charlie being taken into custody, and enter the lab through a back entrance to avoid police attention.

Peter decides that he and Jasmine need to continue work elsewhere. as they pack, Jasmine notices the dead rabbit, and Peter confirms that his governing agent only slowed down her aging.

Meanwhile, Charlie reveals that Jasmine is Mark and Tina's child, and mentions the video footage used to track her development. Ed doesn't believe Charlie, but Max departs to find the footage.

Peter and Jasmine arrive at a lab that he previously shared with Leo, so that he can gather materials for a functional governing agent. Jasmine looks in a mirror, shocked by her older-looking face. As Peter unsuccessfully attempts to open a cabinet containing a governing agent, Leo enters, alerted by a security alarm. He insists that the governing agent doesn't work. As Peter pleads with him, the police arrive, looking for Peter. Peter shoves Leo and escapes with Jasmine through a back exit; he tells Jasmine to wait for him at the conservatory while he retrieves the governing agent, but he is caught and arrested.

While being interrogated by Ed, Peter attempts to escape from the police station, but is stopped by Max, who demands the truth. Carla confesses that she went along with Leo's orders to conduct the AccelRate experiment, so that they could make millions. Ed reluctantly releases Peter and Leo is arrested.

By the time Peter reaches the conservatory, Jasmine is elderly. They accept that it's too late to save her, and she dies in Peter's embrace.

Later, Charlie is packing Peter's possessions into storage, as he has decided to get away from Concord. The final scene shows Peter leaving the campus, holding a jasmine branch in memory of the woman he loved.

== Cast ==
- Michael A. Goorjian as Dr. Peter Hamilton
- Chandra West as Jasmine
- Linda Kash as Charlotte 'Charlie' Tanzi
- Wayne Best as Detective Ed Carlisle
- Timothy Webber as Chief Max Reed
- Zachary Bennett as Mark Stratton
- Gerard Plunkett as Dr. Leo Sardis
- Roberta Maxwell as Carla Jennings
- Daylen Ryckman as Jasmine (Newborn)
- Nicole Rogowsky as Jasmine, 1 Year Old
- Brooke Herron as Jasmine, 2 Years Old
- Kayla Yanke as Jasmine, 3 Years Old
- Taryn Knowles as Jasmine, 4 Years Old
- Jenny-Lynn Hutcheson as Jasmine, 8 Years Old
- Kate Yacula as Jasmine, 12 Years Old
- Doreen Ib–sen as Jasmine, 80 Years Old
- Stephanie Anne Mills as Tina Hogan
- Jonas Chernick as Victor
- Wayne Walker as Moe
- Daina Leitold as Carmen
- Victor Cowie as Hadley
- Seun Olagunju as Joel
- Joyce Krenz as Landlady
- Doreen Brownstone as the Skate Vendor
- Mandy Hochbaum as the Woman in Soap Opera
- Marc Lubosch as the Lab Security
- Arloe Scott as Victor's Girlfriend
- Rick Skene as Uniformed Officer
