= Single, Out =

- Genre: Comedy, drama
- Created by: Lee Galea
- Written by: Lee Galea
- Directed by: Lee Galea
- Starring: Will Hutchins; Steven Christou; Ryan Stewart; Adam Mountain; Jake Hyde; Julie-Anna Evans; Jaive Arlee McEwan; Kimmi Moscicki; Luke Dunne
- Opening theme: "Superhuman" by Clean
- Country of origin: Australia
- Original language: English
- No. of seasons: 4
- No. of episodes: 28

Production
- Producer: Indie Melbourne Productions
- Production locations: Melbourne, Australia
- Running time: 21 minutes per episode

Original release
- Network: Here TV
- Release: October 15, 2022 – present

Single, Out is an Australian comedy drama television series created by Lee Galea and produced by Indie Melbourne Productions. The series follows Adam, a young man who comes out as gay following his first sexual experience.

== Plot ==
When Adam falls in love with his brother's best friend, Josh, he learns to embrace his true identity and comes out to his family. However, when he decides to change the theme of his upcoming art exhibition, it becomes apparent that Adam and Josh have different expectations. Meanwhile, we follow Adam at work and while hanging out with his friends as he embarks on a self-discovery journey.

== Production ==
Galea wrote the first draft of Single, Out in August 2020 while in lockdown in Melbourne. In the same month, he had cast Will Hutchins, Steven Christou, and Jake Hyde to play the leads in the show. Most of the rehearsals were done via Zoom.

The filming of season 1 began on March 3, 2021, and concluded in July 2021. The series was mostly self-financed by Galea with the help of family, friends and crowdfunding via Kickstarter campaigns. Season 2 began filming on September 11, 2022, with the first three episodes premiering at the Melbourne Queer Film Festival on November 17, 2023.

== Release ==
A trailer for the series was released on November 28, 2021. It premiered at the North American OUTshine LGBTQ+ Film Festival on October 15, 2022, and was available for streaming from October 16 to October 19, 2022. Its Australian debut was held at the Melbourne Queer Film Festival on November 12, 2022. The episodes were part of various other film festivals. The series was also featured on all Qantas flights from February 2023 to celebrate Sydney WorldPride 2023.

Season 1 finally became available to a wider audience on the American LGBTQ+ streaming service Here TV on August 11, 2023, branded as a Here TV Exclusive series. In the United Kingdom, the season was made available to buy through Amazon Prime, iTunes and Google TV. In late 2023, the show was also released on iTunes, Apple TV, Google TV and YouTube in Australia and various other countries. The DVD of season 1 was released on September 19, 2023, in America and Canada. On November 8, 2023, the show started airing weekly on OutTV in The Netherlands, Belgium, Sweden, Israel and Spain. In December 2023, season 1 became available for streaming on OUTFILM in Poland.

All seven episodes of season 2 screened for the first time on December 8, 2023, at The Line in Melbourne. Starting from March 8, 2024, the second season was made available for weekly streaming on Here TV in both the United States and Canada. Filming for season 3 started on September 25, 2023, following a new Kickstarter campaign, although a release date hasn't been set. Principal photography for the season concluded on January 23, 2024. On 17 April 2025, it was reported that the fourth season had completed filming and that editing had begun.

== Cast ==
Below is a list of cast members.

=== Main ===
- Will Hutchins as Adam
- Steven Christou as Clayton, Adam's brother
- Adam Mountain as Josh, Adam's love interest and Clayton's best friend (season 1, guest season 2 and 4)
- Ryan Stewart as Marco, Adam's best friend and boss (season 1, guest season 2 and 4)
- Jake Hyde as Gabe, Adam's co-worker who has a crush on him
- Grant Young as Dylan (season 2-4)
- Jack Brophy as Theo, Marco's housemate and Gabe's cousin (seasons 2-4, recurring season 1)
- Joel Nankervis as Ethan, Adam and Clay's estranged brother (season 3-4)
- Jasper Jordan Magri as Spike (season 3, recurring season 2)
- Oliver Thomson as Oliver (season 3, guest season 2)
- Shamita Siva as Ange (season 3-4)

=== Recurring ===
- Julie-Anna Evans as Krystal, Adam and Clayton's mother (season 1-4)
- Grace King as Kat, Clayton's girlfriend (season 1-4)
- Jaive Arlee McEwan as Dazi, Marco's nonbinary love interest (season 1, guest season 4)
- Kimmi Moscicki as Sally, Adam's lesbian co-worker (season 1-4)
- Luke Dunne as Billy, Josh's co-worker (season 1, guest season 2)
- Julie Strini as Vera (season 2, guest season 4)
- Giustino Della Vedova as Dad (season 1-4)
- Jesper Stenberg as Lex (season 2)

== Episodes ==
=== Series overview ===
Season	Episodes	Originally released
1	6	August 4, 2023
2	7	March 8, 2024
3	7	March 14, 2025
4	8	March 6, 2026

=== Season 1 (2023) ===
No. overall	Title	Directed by	Written by	Original release date
1	"Anytime"	Lee Galea	Lee Galea	August 4, 2023
2	"Out"	Lee Galea	Lee Galea	August 4, 2023
3	"Single"	Lee Galea	Lee Galea	August 11, 2023
4	"Extreme"	Lee Galea	Lee Galea & Will Hutchins	August 18, 2023
5	"Same Sex"	Lee Galea	Lee Galea	August 25, 2023
6	"With You"	Lee Galea	Lee Galea	August 25, 2023

=== Season 2 (2024) ===
No. overall	No. in season	Title	Directed by	Written by	Original release date
7	1	"Hard"	Lee Galea	Lee Galea	March 8, 2024
8	2	"Post"	Lee Galea	Lee Galea	March 15, 2024
9	3	"Eggs"	Lee Galea	Lee Galea & Jake Hyde	March 22, 2024
10	4	"Happy?"	Lee Galea	Lee Galea & Jake Hyde	March 29, 2024
11	5	"A Good Man"	Lee Galea	Lee Galea	April 5, 2024
12	6	"A Nightmare"	Lee Galea	Lee Galea	April 12, 2024
13	7	"The Birthday Boy"	Lee Galea	Lee Galea	April 19, 2024

=== Season 3 (2025) ===
No. overall	No. in season	Title	Directed by	Written by	Original release date
14	1	"Half"	Lee Galea	Lee Galea	March 14, 2025
15	2	"Hen's Night Out"	Lee Galea	Lee Galea	March 21, 2025
16	3	"Laptop"	Lee Galea	Lee Galea	March 28, 2025
17	4	"The Play"	Lee Galea	Lee Galea	April 4, 2025
18	5	"Angel Hair"	Lee Galea	Lee Galea	April 11, 2025
19	6	"Little Statues"	Lee Galea	Lee Galea	April 18, 2025
20	7	"In Your Dreams"	Lee Galea	Lee Galea	April 25, 2025

=== Season 4 ===
No. overall	No. in season	Title	Directed by	Written by	Original release date
21	1	"Early Moon"	Lee Galea	Lee Galea	March 6, 2026
22	2	"Strip"	Lee Galea	Lee Galea	March 13, 2026
23	3	"White Bubbles"	Lee Galea	Lee Galea	March 20, 2026
24	4	"Hot Blooded"	Lee Galea	Lee Galea	March 27, 2026
25	5	"Pump!"	Lee Galea	Lee Galea	April 3, 2026
26	6	"Fever"	Lee Galea	Lee Galea	April 10, 2026
27	7	"Melon"	Lee Galea	Lee Galea	April 17, 2026
28	8	"And the winner is..."	Lee Galea	Lee Galea	April 24, 2026
