= Rosy (film) =

2018 film by Jess Bond

- Official release poster
- Directed by: Jess Bond
- Written by: Jess Bond
- Produced by: Jonathan Schwartz; Jess Bond; Alex Bach
- Starring: Nat Wolff; Stacy Martin; Tony Shalhoub; Johnny Knoxville
- Cinematography: Zachary Galler
- Edited by: Ross Minoru Laing
- Music by: Danny Bensi; Saunder Jurriaans
- Production companies: Super Crispy Entertainment; Mirror Cube Films
- Distributed by: The Orchard
- Release date: July 17, 2018
- Running time: 92 minutes
- Country: United States
- Language: English

Rosy is a 2018 American romantic comedy thriller film written and directed by Jess Bond. It stars Nat Wolff, Stacy Martin, Tony Shalhoub, and Johnny Knoxville. It was released via digital and on-demand platforms on July 17, 2018, by The Orchard.

== Cast ==
- Nat Wolff as Doug Landver
- Stacy Martin as Rosy Monroe
- Tony Shalhoub as Dr. Godin
- Johnny Knoxville as James
- Chukwudi Iwuji as Manager
- Adam David Thompson as Eddie
- Alex Karpovsky as Marty

== Production ==
In November 2015, it was announced Nat Wolff had been cast in the film, with Jess Bond directing from a screenplay she wrote, while Jonathan Schwartz served as a producer. In March 2016, it was announced that Sky Ferreira had joined the cast of the film in an undisclosed role, but she later dropped out for unknown reasons.

== Release ==
The film was released on July 17, 2018, by The Orchard.
