= Luke Cook =

Australian actor (born 1986)

- Born: 19 December 1986 (age 39); Sydney, Australia
- Occupations: Actor; writer
- Spouse: Kara Wilson (m. 2020)
- Children: 3

Luke Cook (born 19 December 1986) is an Australian actor, director, writer, and content creator, known for his role as Lucifer in the Netflix series Chilling Adventures of Sabrina.

== Early life ==
Cook was born in Sydney, Australia, and is the youngest of five children. Cook grew up in a religious family with his father being a church minister.

In grade six he auditioned for his school play by impersonating Frank Sinatra, and was so thrilled by the audience reaction that he decided to become an actor.

== Career ==
While studying acting in Sydney, Cook met a manager from Los Angeles who encouraged him to move to California which he did at the age of 22. Cook spent ten years in LA pursuing acting before his big break and noted that he was given some great opportunities to be on major shows, but issues popped up along the way: "Looking back, there's a very funny story. When I got off the plane, I had two big tv shows booked, and couldn't do them because of my visa. I even thought to myself whenever I booked them, 'I haven't worked hard enough for this,' and as soon as I thought that, I couldn't work because of my visa. After that I didn't book anything for years. Then I had to grind and grind for years. It's funny the way the universe works, or God, or whatever you like to call it." In between acting roles, Cook worked as a bartender and credits the decade of struggle for helping him to not take anything for granted.

The first role he scored in Los Angeles was in the sitcom Mystery Girls starring Tori Spelling and Jennie Garth, playing RuPaul's evil assistant.

In 2016, Cook wrote and performed the starring role in the short film Good Morning. The film was an official selection at a number of film festivals, and Cook won the 2017 Flagler Film Festival award for Best Actor, Drama/Thriller.

In 2017, Cook made his feature film debut in Guardians of the Galaxy Vol. 2. In the same year, he played opposite Al Pacino in the theatre production of God Looked Away.

Playing the role of Lucifer Morningstar, Cook shot the first series of Chilling Adventures of Sabrina in November 2018 and the next series in July 2019.

In September 2019, Cook shot Katy Keene in which he plays Guy LaMontagne.

In 2020, Cook wrapped on indie film Eye Without a Face in which he stars as a con man. In the same year he starred in Australian indie film How Do You Know Chris in the title role.

In February 2021, Cook was announced in the fourth season of Dynasty and will play Kirby's ex-boyfriend Oliver.

In July 2021, it was confirmed that Cook would join the second season of Dollface as a recurring guest star.

In 2025, Cook was nominated for a Logie award for his work on the Stan TV series Good Cop/Bad Cop.

== Personal life ==
Cook and New Zealand stylist Kara Wilson became engaged in December 2019, and they were married on 16 May 2020. Their first son was born in November 2020, followed by their second son born at home on 15 November 2022. In September 2025 they welcomed their third son, also a homebirth. He also has a rescued Chihuahua named Cindy.

Cook told Brief Take that he would love to do some big character roles in a similar vein to Jim Carrey, and also cites Ben Stiller and Ricky Gervais as influences.

On social media, Cook shows off his impersonation and acting skills with his wider fan base. He has created a group of characters such as a model manager named Steve Kay and an Australian mother named Louise.

Cook is involved with a number of charities including The Leukemia & Lymphoma Society and raised $10k for a hospital in Sierra Leone by selling photos of his feet.

Due to her religious beliefs, Cook's mother refuses to watch him play the satanic role in Chilling Adventures of Sabrina, while his father is encouraging.

== Filmography ==
=== Film ===
Year	Title	Role	Notes
2004	The Graffiti Artist	The Graffiti Artist	
2007	20-20 Hindsight	Kurt	Short film
2009	Audition	Julian Kindred	Short film
2013	Move-in Special	Tim	Short film
2013	Glove	Tom Sutheron	Short film
2013	Where Ya at	Jake	Short film
2013	Teen Force Ninjas	Red Ninja	Short film
2013	Love and Laundry	Lachlan	Short film
2013	Highway 15	Party Goer	Short film
2014	First Kiss	Kisser	Short film
2014	First Sh*T	Man	Short film
2014	Alien's Sister	Martin	Short film
2014	Lady Lonely	Stranger	Short film
2015	Always Worthy	Jake Slade	Short film
2015	Why It Would Suck to Date an Avenger	Black Widow's Boyfriend	Short film
2015	Wooden Dolls	Eddie	Short film
2015	Once More, with Feeling	Will	Short film
2016	An Arbitration	Donald Slayer	Short film
2016	Good Morning	Al	Short film
2016	Slant	Suitor	Short film
2016	When Kids Grow Up	Clint	Short film
2016	Heirloom	Paul	Short film
2016	Gone	Boyfriend	Short film
2016	Escape	Rains	Short film
2017	Guardians of the Galaxy Vol. 2	Zylak's Frenemy	
2017	How It All Began	Luke	Short film
2018	Amigos	Jeremy	Short film
2020	How Do You Know Chris?	Chris	
2021	Eye Without a Face	Eric	

=== Television ===
Year	Title	Role	Notes
2010	Cops L.A.C.	Brandon	Episode: "A Veil of Tears"
2013	Soccer Moms	Chadwick	Episode: "Fresh Meat"
2014	Seeing Past It	Danny	Episode: "Danny"
2014	Mystery Girls	Seth	Episode: "Bag Ladies"
2015	Ur in Analysis	Rick	Television film
2015	Baby Daddy	Ian	Episode: "One Night Stand Off"
2015	Faking It	Daniel	2 episodes
2015	Rules of Engagement	Harris	Episode: "Crack the Code"
2015	The Librarians	Dorian Gray	Episode: "And the Image of Image"
2016	Modern Family	Cliff	Episode: "I Don't Know How She Does It"
2016	Intricate Vengeance	Oliver Sten	Episode: "Pilot"
2016	Major Crimes	Joey Bowie	Episode: "Family Law"
2016	The Candidate	Donald Trump	Main role; 3 episodes
2016	Dope Boys	DJ Schwag	Television film
2016–2019	Zach & Dennis: How It All Began	Luke	Recurring role; 8 episodes
2018	How to Get Away with Murder	Guard Leon	Episode: "He's a Bad Father"
2019–2020	Chilling Adventures of Sabrina	Lucifer Morningstar / Satan	Recurring role; 11 episodes
2020	Chilling Adventures of Sabrina	Salem Saberhagen	Voice role; episode: "Chapter Thirty-Five: The Endless"
2020	Katy Keene	Guy LaMontagne	Recurring role; 8 episodes
2021	Dynasty	Oliver Noble	Recurring role; 4 episodes
2021	S.W.A.T.	A.J.	2 episodes
2022	Dollface	Fender	Recurring role; 4 episodes
2023	Bubble Guppies	Mr. Clawson	Voice role; episode: "Zooli's New Pet!"
2024	Hacks	Jack Danby	2 episodes
2025	Good Cop/Bad Cop	Henry Hickman	Main role

=== Video games ===
Year	Title	Role	Notes
2019	Star Wars Jedi: Fallen Order	Sorc Tormo	Voice
2023	Call of Duty: Modern Warfare III	Jack Fletcher	Voice
2024	Call of Duty: Black Ops 6	Jack Fletcher	Voice

=== Theatre ===
Year	Title	Role	Notes
2017	God Looked Away	TBA	
