= Laura Mennell =

Canadian actress

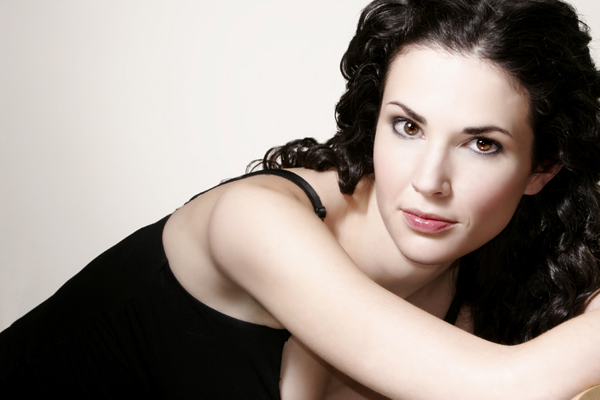
- Mennell, photographed in 2009
- Born: 18 April 1980 (age 46); Surrey, British Columbia, Canada
- Occupation: Actress
- Years active: 1996–present
- Relatives: Alan Young (cousin)

Laura Mennell (/mɛˈnɛl/; born 18 April 1980) is a Canadian actress known for her roles in Thirteen Ghosts, Alphas, Haven, Loudermilk, The Man in the High Castle, Watchmen and Batwoman. In 2011/2012 Mennell co-starred on the sci-fi television series Alphas. Laura appeared as Charlotte Cross in the fifth season of the Syfy series Haven, and she starred in the comedy series Loudermilk from 2017 to 2018.

== Early life ==
Mennell is of Irish, British, and French ancestry. She says she was a "major theatre geek in high school."

Mennell is the cousin of the late Alan Young, who was the voice of Scrooge McDuck and star of the classic TV series, Mister Ed (1961).

== Personal life ==
She is fluent in French.

== Filmography ==
Laura Mennell film work
Year	Title	Role	Notes
2001	Thirteen Ghosts	Susan LeGrow, the Bound Woman	
2003	Alarium	Vivienne	Short film
2004	White Grease Paint		Short film
2004	11:11	Sara Tobias	
2007	The Visitor	Teacher	Short film
2007	Trick 'r Treat	Allie	
2008	Elegy	Cute Girl	
2008	Christmas Cottage	Nicole - Portrait	
2009	Watchmen	Janey Slater	
2009	Driven to Kill	Lanie Drachev	
2010	Hard Ride to Hell	Tessa	Direct-to-video
2010	The Homestead	Jane	Short film
2017	Limina	Lois	Short film
2025	The Monkey	Petey's mother	

Laura Mennell television work
Year	Title	Role	Notes
1998	I've Been Waiting for You	Sarah Lancaster	TV movie
1999	Millennium	Sorority Sister #1	Episode: "Collateral Damage"
1999	Stargate SG-1	Mary	Episode: "Demons"
2000	Scorn	Lisa	TV movie
2001	Special Unit 2	Amber / Naughty Girl #3	Episode: "The Eve"
2001	Cold Squad	Larisa Childs	Episode: "The Needle and the Debutante"
2002	UC: Undercover	Collin's Daughter	Episode: "Teddy C"
2003	Andromeda	Siara	Episode: "Conduit to Destiny"
2004	Dead Like Me	Desiree	Episode: "Rites of Passage"
2005	Stargate Atlantis	Sanir	Episode: "The Brotherhood"
2005	Personal Effects	Nicole Forester	TV movie
2006	The L Word	Sister Toni	2 episodes
2006	Flight 93	Elizabeth Wainio	TV movie
2007	Montana Sky	Lily Mercy	TV movie
2007	The Last Trimester	Marlene Brenden	TV movie
2007	The 4400	Young Audrey Parker	Episode: "Audrey Parker's Come and Gone"
2007	Fallen	Penemue	Episode: "The Time of the Redeemer"
2007	Sanctuary	Caird	Mini Series; 4 episodes
2007	Flash Gordon	Lilian	Episode: "Life Source"
2007	Blood Ties	Christina	Episode: "The Devil You Know"
2008	Sanctuary	Caird	Episode: "Fata Morgana"
2008	The Christmas Clause	Jill	TV movie
2009	Eureka	Dr. Rivers	Episode: "Shower the People"
2009	Sight Unseen	Cloe	TV movie
2009	Health Nutz	Jennifer Noir	TV movie
2009	Smallville	Toni	Episode: "Infamous"
2010	A Trace of Danger	Beth	TV movie
2010	Fringe	Rose Falls	Episode: "Johari Window"
2010	Supernatural	Brigitta; Djinn	Episode: "Exile on Main St."; Episode: "Caged Heat"
2011	Smallville	Janet Dawson	Episode: "Finale"
2011–2012	Alphas	Nina Theroux	Main (Seasons 1–2); 24 episodes
2013	Republic of Doyle	Rachel Malloy	Episode: "The Works"
2013	The Christmas Ornament	Rebecca	TV movie
2014	Motive	Samantha Turner	Recurring (Season 2); 8 episodes
2014	Stolen from the Womb	Chelsey Miller	TV movie
2014–2015	Haven	Charlotte Cross	Recurring (Season 5); 13 episodes
2015	My New Best Friend	Samantha	TV movie
2015	When Calls the Heart	Samantha Madison	2 episodes
2015	Gourmet Detective	Pauline Duquette	TV movie
2015	A Country Wedding	Catherine	TV movie
2015	Cedar Cove	Kelly	2 episodes
2015	Girlfriends' Guide to Divorce	Marria	Episode: "Rule #605: You Can Go Home Again"
2016	Legends of Tomorrow	Gail Knox	Episode: "Night of the Hawk"
2016	Travelers	ADA Peckham	Episode: "Donner"
2016–2017	Van Helsing	Rebecca	Main (Season 1), Guest (Season 2); 9 episodes
2017	Real Detective	Tammy Armstrong	Episode: "Every Rose Has a Thorn"
2017	Loudermilk	Allison Montgomery	Main (Seasons 1–2); 14 episodes
2017	Maternal Instinct	Heather	TV movie
2018	The Man in the High Castle	Thelma Harris	Recurring (Season 3); 9 episodes
2019-20	Project Blue Book	Mimi Hynek	Main (Seasons 1–2); 20 episodes
2021	Batwoman	Enigma	4 episodes
