= Remember the Daze =

- Theatrical release poster
- Directed by: Jess Manafort
- Written by: Jess Manafort
- Produced by: Jess Manafort; Mathew Rhodes; Judd Payne
- Starring: Amber Heard; Alexa Vega; Leighton Meester; Melonie Diaz; Lyndsy Fonseca; Chris Marquette; Sean Marquette; Marnette Patterson; John Robinson; Khleo Thomas
- Cinematography: Steve Gainer
- Edited by: Larry Bock; Meg Reticker
- Music by: Dustin O'Halloran
- Distributed by: First Look International; Freestyle Releasing
- Release date: August 12, 2007 (Los Angeles Film Festival)
- Running time: 101 minutes
- Country: United States
- Language: English

Remember the Daze, originally titled The Beautiful Ordinary, is a 2007 drama film released in theaters in April 2008. The film was directed by Jess Manafort. The plot of the movie has been described as "a glimpse into the teenage wasteland of suburbia 1999 that takes place over 24-hours, and the teenagers who make their way through the last day of high school in the last year of the past millennium."

The film was selected as one of the eight films competing in the Narrative Competition at the 2007 Los Angeles Film Festival which took place June 21 – July 1. This was the world premiere of the film.

In February 2008, the movie's title was changed from The Beautiful Ordinary. It was released in two theaters in LA, one in New York and one in Washington, D.C., on April 11, 2008, and was released on DVD on June 3, 2008. The movie was filmed primarily in Wilmington, North Carolina, during May 2006.

== Plot ==
On the last day of school in 1999 several suburban teenagers decide to get high and party. Julia Ford (Amber Heard) feels frustrated because her boyfriend has failed his final year of school and must repeat it. Unsure whether or not to stay with him she decides to try to hook up with her friend Stacey Cherry's (Marnette Patterson) abusive boyfriend hoping that by sleeping with him Stacey will finally leave her boyfriend and Julia will figure out whether or not she wants to stay with her own boyfriend.

After her friends tease her about never having a boyfriend Brianne (Melonie Diaz) begins to openly flirt with drug dealer Mod. This incites Dawn's anger since, unbeknownst to the rest of their friends, Brianne and Dawn are secretly dating.

Tori (Leighton Meester) plans to take mushrooms with her best friend Sylvia but wants to delay it until after she is done babysitting. When Sylvia takes the mushrooms when they are in charge of the kids Tori decides to join her and the two end up shirking their babysitting duties.

Everyone convenes on the football field where a fight breaks out. Julia does not have sex with Stacey's boyfriend as he leaves her mid-make out. Stacey has sex with Riley, who had been desperate to lose his virginity, finally using the fact that she cheated on her boyfriend as an excuse to break up with him. Despite Dawn's willingness to go public with their relationship Brianne insists that they stay closeted.

In the morning Thomas, a shy photographer hanging out on the fringes of the group, develops photographs of the events of the previous day.

== Cast ==
- Amber Heard as Julia Ford
- Melonie Diaz as Brianne
- Marnette Patterson as Stacey Cherry
- Alexa Vega as Holly
- Leighton Meester as Tori
- Wesley Jonathan as Biz
- Aaron Himelstein as Riley
- Chris Marquette as Felix
- John Robinson as Bailey
- Lyndsy Fonseca as Dawn
- Sean Marquette as Mod
- Khleo Thomas as Dylan
- Shahine Ezell as Eddie
- Katrina Begin as Sylvia
- Charles Chen as Thomas
- Caroline Dollar as Kiki
- Max Hoffman as Zack
- Sunny Doench as Mrs. Turner
- Moira Kelly as Mrs. Ford
- Brie Larson as Angie Ford
- Douglas Smith as Pete
- Stella Maeve as Lighty
- Michael Welch as Stephen
- Robert X. Golphin as Boy No. 2
- Neil Strickland as Extra

== Critical reception ==
On Rotten Tomatoes it has a score of 0% based on reviews from six critics. On Metacritic it had an average score of 36 out of 100, based on reviews from six critics.

Peter Debruge of Variety said that the movie "demonstrates considerable promise on the part of its director and her up-and-coming cast" but had no "great secrets or revelations." Laura Kern of The New York Times wrote: "Ultimately, the ensemble of more than twenty featured characters seems as vapid as the intentionally caricatured adults who pop up on occasion. Where are this decade's John Hugheses? Or even the Cameron Crowes?"
