= The Haunting of Sorority Row =

2007 television film

- DVD cover
- Genre: Supernatural horror
- Screenplay by: Jed Seidel; Michael Vickerman
- Story by: Jed Seidel
- Directed by: Bert Kish
- Starring: Leighton Meester; Kailin See; Lisa Marie Caruk; Carlo Marks; Agam Darshi; Elyse Levesque; Meghan Ory; Adrian Roman Petriw
- Composer: Michael Richard Plowman
- Country of origin: Canada
- Original language: English

Production
- Producer: Scott Kennedy
- Cinematography: Mathias Herndl
- Editor: Roger Mattiussi
- Running time: 91 minutes
- Production companies: Brainstorm Media; MarVista Entertainment; Highwire Pictures

Original release
- Network: Global
- Release: October 6, 2007

The Haunting of Sorority Row (known as Deadly Pledge in Australia, the United Kingdom, and France) is a 2007 Canadian supernatural horror television film directed by Bert Kish, starring Leighton Meester, Kailin See, Lisa Marie Caruk, Carlo Marks, Agam Darshi, Elyse Levesque, Meghan Ory, and Adrian Roman Petriw. The film premiered on October 6, 2007, on Global in Canada and on Lifetime in the United States.

== Premise ==
The film revolves around a freshman at a college who believes a haunted house on sorority row is hiding sinister secrets. A sorority ritual leads to a ghost seeking revenge on sorority members.

== Cast ==
- Leighton Meester as Samantha "Sam" Willows
- Kailin See as Jane Horten
- Lara Gilchrist as Jena Thorne
- Lisa Marie Caruk as Leslie
- Agam Darshi as Rachel
- Meghan Ory as Amanda
- Adrian Roman Petriw as Oliver
- Jessica Huras as Nikki Evans
- Carlo Marks as Spencer
- Elyse Levesque as Whitney Seasons
- David Patrick Flemming as Collin
- Patrick Keating as Plumber

== Production ==
The film was shot in Vancouver. Its working title was Hell House.

== Release ==
The film was premiered on October 6, 2007, on Global in Canada and on Lifetime in the United States as a Halloween tie-in. In France, NT1 broadcast the film on July 6, 2011, under the title Dark Intentions.

A barebones DVD was released in the United States on August 24, 2010, with Dolby Digital stereo sound and a 1.33:1 "full screen" aspect ratio. In France, the film was released in the DVD and Blu-ray formats on May 2, 2012, under the title Deadly Pledge. Both discs feature the proper "widescreen" presentation of the film and the blu-ray contains lossless stereo tracks in both the original English and dubbed French as well as lossy Dolby Digital 5.1 mixes in both languages. It is currently the only high-definition release of the film.
