= Grace Chow =

Sinaporean-Australian actress

- Born: 2001 (age 24–25); Singapore
- Occupation: Actress
- Years active: 2022–present

Grace Chow is a Singaporean-Australian actress. She is best known for playing Lily Lim in the comedy drama series Good Cop/Bad Cop.

== Early life ==
Chow's parent emigrated from Singapore when she was very young. Chow grew up in the small town of Bruce Rock, Western Australia. She graduated from the Western Australian Academy of Performing Arts in 2020.

== Career ==
Early on in her career she appeared in the drama series The Twelve and the crime mystery series Mystery Road: Origin. She is best known for playing Lily Lim, a dispatcher, in the comedy dramedy series Good Cop/Bad Cop. She was startstruck working with Leighton Meester as she is a die hard Monte Carlo fan. Chow is also a successful playwright, winning the Griffin Award in 2022 for her play The Promise Land.

== Filmography ==
=== Film ===
Year	Title	Role	Notes
2022	Seashell	Young Mama	Short

=== Television ===
Year	Title	Role	Notes
2022	Mystery Road: Origin	Cindy	6 episodes
2024	The Twelve	Wendy Hang	3 episodes
2025	Good Cop/Bad Cop	Lily Lim	8 episodes
