= Aaron Himelstein =

American actor (born 1985)

- Born: October 10, 1985 (age 41); Buffalo Grove, Illinois, U.S.
- Occupation: Actor
- Years active: 1999–present

Aaron Himelstein (born October 10, 1985) is an American actor. Following his film debut in High Fidelity (2000), he played the younger version of Austin Powers in the spy comedy film Austin Powers in Goldmember (2002). He subsequently appeared in several films such as All the Boys Love Mandy Lane, Fast Food Nation (both 2006), Remember the Daze (2007), and The Informers (2008). Himelstein joined the Marvel Cinematic Universe, playing the role of Cameron Klein in Captain America: The Winter Soldier (2014), and Avengers: Age of Ultron (2015).

On television, he had a recurring role as Friedman on the CBS fantasy family drama series Joan of Arcadia (2003–05), and provided the voice of Desna on the Nickelodeon animated action fantasy series The Legend of Korra (2013–14).

== Early life ==
Himelstein was born on October 10, 1985, in Buffalo Grove, Illinois, the son of Susan (Maloney) and Robert "Bob" Himelstein.

== Personal life ==
He is a close friend of Joan of Arcadia stars Michael Welch and Chris Marquette. He and Welch had known each other for several years but they did not become good friends until the series began in 2003.

He dated Remember the Daze co-star Leighton Meester, after meeting in 2007. In November 2011, Meester and Himelstein briefly rekindled their relationship, before breaking up in 2012.

== Filmography ==
=== Film ===
Year	Title	Role	Notes
2000	High Fidelity	Boy in park	
2002	Austin Powers in Goldmember	Young Austin Powers	
2006	Fast Food Nation	Andrew	
2006	Down the P.C.H.	T-Boy	
2006	All the Boys Love Mandy Lane	Red	
2007	Remember the Daze	Riley	
2008	Assassination of a High School President	Tad Goltz	
2008	The Informers	Raymond	
2009	The Assistants	Ben Goodrich	
2011	Losers Take All	Dave	
2014	Captain America: The Winter Soldier	Cameron Klein	Credited as "Launch Tech #1"
2015	Avengers: Age of Ultron	Cameron Klein	
2016	Time Toys	McGinson	
2024	Blink Twice	Asshole manager	

=== Television ===
Year	Title	Role	Notes
1999	Cupid	Andy Tucker	Episode: "The Children's Hour"
2001	What About Joan?	Doug	2 episodes
2002	Do Over	Andrew Wages	Episode: "Short-Cuts"
2003	Boston Public	William Guilbert	2 episodes
2003	Titletown		Television film
2003–2005	Joan of Arcadia	Friedman	33 episodes
2004	North Shore	Charlie	Episode: "Tessa"
2004	Significant Others	Justin	Episode: "A Date, Fate and Jail Bait"
2004	House	Luke Palmeiro	Episode: "The Socratic Method"
2006	Las Vegas	Leo Pedowitz	Episode: "Meatball Montecito"
2007	Journeyman	Partygoer / Raver	2 episodes
2009	Community	Jeremy Simmons	Episode: "Debate 109"
2013	Doll & Em	Mike	4 episodes
2013–2014	The Legend of Korra	Desna (voice)	10 episodes
2017	Rosewood	Pete Harmon	Episode: "Benzodiazepine & the Benjamins"
2017	The Chosen	Simon the shepherd	Episode: "The Shepherd"
2018	Unphiltered	Larry	3 episodes
2019	Love, Death & Robots	Rookie (voice)	Episode: "Blind Spot"
