= The Salton Sea (2002 film) =

- Theatrical release poster
- Directed by: D. J. Caruso
- Written by: Tony Gayton
- Produced by: Frank Darabont; Eriq La Salle; Ken Aguado; Butch Robinson
- Starring: Val Kilmer; Vincent D'Onofrio; Adam Goldberg; Luis Guzmán; Doug Hutchison; Anthony LaPaglia; Glenn Plummer; Peter Sarsgaard; Deborah Kara Unger; Chandra West; B.D. Wong
- Cinematography: Amir Mokri
- Edited by: Jim Page
- Music by: Thomas Newman
- Production company: Castle Rock Entertainment
- Distributed by: Warner Bros. Pictures
- Release date: April 26, 2002
- Running time: 105 minutes
- Country: United States
- Language: English
- Budget: $18 million
- Box office: $1.1 million

The Salton Sea is a 2002 American neo-noir crime thriller film directed by D. J. Caruso, and starring Val Kilmer and Vincent D'Onofrio.

The film was shot on location in Los Angeles, at LA Center Studios, and the Salton Sea.

== Plot ==
"Danny Parker" is a Los Angeles speed freak (meth addict) who hangs out with junkie friends while indulging in drugs. He also moonlights as an informant for two corrupt cops, Gus Morgan and Al Garcetti. Danny is trying to set up a large meth score with notorious drug dealer Pooh-Bear, an eccentric psychopath who lost his nose to excessive snorting of meth, while also attempting to set up a sting operation for Morgan and Garcetti. When he returns home, Danny takes on his former persona as trumpet player "Tom Van Allen." He reveals to Colette, an abused neighbor, that he was once happily married, only to watch as his wife was gunned down by masked thieves during a stopover at the Salton Sea.

When meeting with Pooh-Bear, Danny becomes fearful of his bizarre homicidal behavior, taping a gun to the bottom of Pooh-Bear's dinner table. Danny's parents-in-law track him down, believing he has sunk into depression after his wife's death, but he refuses their help. As the deal approaches, it is revealed that Danny is double crossing Morgan and Garcetti by working with the FBI to take them down. Danny did so upon investigating Morgan and realizing he was one of the gunmen who killed his wife, delving into the drug world to become a believable junkie and ingratiate himself with him and Garcetti.

On the night of the deal, Danny, with the help of his best friend Jimmy, leads the FBI to the wrong location and drives to Pooh-Bear's compound. At the dinner table, tensions rise and one of Pooh-Bear's armed men tries to kill Danny, who retrieves the gun he stashed earlier and shoots the rest of the gang. Shot in the chest by Pooh-Bear, Parker collapses to the floor. Pooh-Bear, wounded in the shooting, encounters and is killed by Morgan and Garcetti. Garcetti is then killed by Danny, who had been wearing a bulletproof vest. Morgan shoots Danny, revealing that he knows he murdered his wife. Danny stabs Morgan in the neck with Pooh-Bear's syringe. He picks up a pistol, and briefly contemplates suicide, but kills Morgan and flees.

Back in his apartment, Danny dons his Tom Van Allen identity again but is shot by Colette's boyfriend, Quincy. Quincy is in fact an agent tasked with exacting vengeance for the Mexicali Boys, a leader of whom Danny had previously betrayed to police. Collette says she was forced to betray Danny because her daughter was being held hostage. The room catches fire, and Danny plays one more tune on his trumpet before passing out. Danny regains consciousness to find that Jimmy saved him from the fire and taken him to a hospital. After he recovers, he leaves Los Angeles, and the identities of "Danny Parker" and "Tom Van Allen", behind.

== Cast ==
- Val Kilmer as Danny Parker/Tom Van Allen
- Vincent D'Onofrio as Holland Dale "Pooh-Bear" Monty
- Adam Goldberg as Kujo
- Luis Guzmán as Quincy
- Doug Hutchison as Gus Morgan
- Anthony LaPaglia as Al Garcetti
- Glenn Plummer as Bobby
- Peter Sarsgaard as Jimmy the Finn
- Deborah Kara Unger as Colette Vaughn
- Chandra West as Liz Van Allen
- B.D. Wong as Bubba
- R. Lee Ermey as Verne Plummer
- Shalom Harlow as Nancy
- Shirley Knight as Nancy Plummer
- Michael Lee Aday as Bo
- Danny Trejo as Little Bill
- Josh Todd as Big Bill

== Production ==
In July 1999, it was announced Castle Rock Entertainment had bought the spec comedy thriller The Salton Sea for D.J. Caruso to direct and for Frank Darabont, Eriq La Salle and Ken Aguado to produce.

== Release ==
The film opened April 26, 2002 in 15 theaters in Los Angeles, New York, San Francisco and Toronto. It grossed $166,309 in its opening weekend. The film was due to expand on May 10 and May 17 but did not increase its theater count on May 10. It expanded to 30 theaters on May 17 but reduced to 17 the following week.

== Reception ==
Roger Ebert of the Chicago Sun-Times gave the film three out of four stars and wrote:

The Salton Sea is all pieces and no coherent whole. Maybe life on meth is like that. The plot does finally explain itself, like a dislocated shoulder popping back into place, but then the plot is off the shelf; only the characters and details set the movie aside from its stablemates. I liked it because it was so endlessly, grotesquely, inventive: Watching it, I pictured Tarantino throwing a stick into a swamp, and the movie swimming out through the muck, retrieving it, and bringing it back with its tail wagging.

Critic Robert Koehler, writing in Variety magazine, gave the film a mixed review, writing, "The latest fashion, The Salton Sea strains past the breaking point to provide the old genre with new couture. Tyro helmer D.J. Caruso appears compelled to strut his cinematic stuff in every scene, whether called for or not, and in the process overplays his assignment."

The New York Times film critic Stephen Holden believes the film to be derivative, and wrote:

The Salton Sea, directed by D. J. Caruso from a screenplay by Tony Gayton (who also wrote the recent Murder by Numbers), blatantly recycles moods and images from other recent films and compacts them into a formula of its own. From Heat it borrows a noirish twilighted despair; from Pulp Fiction, a fondness for grotesque caricature; from Requiem for a Dream, a contortedly druggy ambience; and from Fight Club a surrealist bravado and choked-back super-macho cool. All that borrowing lends The Salton Sea style to burn but little personality of its own.

Slate film critic David Edelstein reviewed the work of actor Val Kilmer favorably, writing:

The good news is that Kilmer, a smart, nervy actor who looked to be down for the count—the victim, some have suggested, of his own untenable temperament—is in there working hard and giving a real performance. He doesn't make the movie worth seeing, but he makes me hope to see him again.

As of July 2022, the film holds a 63% approval rating on the review aggregation website Rotten Tomatoes, based on 84 reviews with an average rating of 5.78 out of 10. The site's consensus states: "A slick Tarantino-inspired movie that is not for everyone." Metacritic, which uses a weighted average, assigned the film a score of 41 out of 100, based on 30 critics, indicating "mixed or average" reviews.

It grossed $764,554 in the United States and Canada and $1,073,198 worldwide.
