= The Last Trimester =

- Written by: Mark Cole
- Directed by: Mark Cole
- Starring: Chandra West; Jim Thorburn; Matthew Harrison; Lara Gilchrist

Production
- Production company: Lifetime Entertainment Television

Original release
- Release: July 3, 2006

The Last Trimester is a 2006 made-for-TV movie starring Chandra West, Jim Thorburn, Matthew Harrison and Lara Gilchrist.

== Plot ==
Tracy (Chandra West) and Eric Smythe (Jim Thorburn) are a happily married couple who find it difficult to have children. After numerous failed in-vitro fertilization treatments and a heartbreaking near adoption, Eric decides to get an old girlfriend Gabby (Lara Gilchrist) to allow Tracy and himself to adopt her baby, although Eric's connection to Gabby is kept secret from Tracy. Gabby agrees to let Eric and Tracy to adopt her unborn child as she is already late in her second trimester. Tracy takes an instant liking to Gabby seeing her as her hope and forming a sisterly connection to the young lady, however Gabby seems more attached to Eric, loving the attention and affection from both Eric and Tracy. Tracy soon allows the down-on-her-luck Gabby to move in. Gabby has started her last trimester of pregnancy, and was forced to move out of her apartment after a flaky roommate didn't pay her share of the rent on the apartment. Tracy had been secretly giving Gabby money and lavishing clothes to her. Closer to the due date, Gabby starts appearing unstable, openly flirting with Eric, acting scary to Tracy, and destroying their home. Soon after Gabby goes into labor only allowing "the father" of her baby into the room to hold "their" daughter. She breast feeds the baby in front of Tracy, calling her "my baby", as she had yet to sign the adoption papers. She repeatedly calls their home, making threatening comments about taking her baby back. Eric, fed up, has a public encounter with Gabby where she flirts with him and appears drunk. Then a phone call regarding her apparent suicide leads the police to believe she has been murdered.

One day while out with the baby Tracy backs into a police car and meets Detective Nick Hanford (Matthew Harrison) and he becomes her touchstone as he investigates for her the drama with Gabby and the apparent involvement with Eric, and the secret past of Eric and Gabby. While gardening Tracy stumbles upon a shirt with blood and fears that Eric murdered Gabby to gain custody of the baby. Tracy calls Nick for help and he confirms that the police suspect Eric and he has been arrested. Nick offers to help her hid out temporarily at his cabin for safety. While at the cabin Nick openly flirts with her. Eric at the police station asks to speak to Nick, the investigating officer. Another officer tells Eric that Nick is on emergency medical leave following the death of his wife and child.

Eric then puts the pieces together, discovers that Nick was involved with Gabby, and rushes home to find that Tracy has taken off with the baby. Eric finds the number and address of Nick's cabin and races to find Tracy. While at the cabin Tracy tries to find out information on Eric's case, and discovers that Nick had a child who died, and he tells her that baby Sarah looks just like her father. Nick reveals that he is Sarah's father and he killed Gabby because he didn't want to lose another child. Nick tells Tracy that Gabby only wanted Eric. Nick offers to be a family with Tracy and Sarah, but she tries to run to the baby and leave. Nick attacks her, tying her up and dragging her to an old well to drop her down. Eric shows up and fights Nick, which leads to Nick's death. Tracy goes to Eric and they go off to retrieve their daughter.

== Cast ==
- Chandra West as Tracy Smythe
- Jim Thorburn as Eric Smythe
- Matthew Harrison as Detective Nick Hansford
- Lara Gilchrist as Gabby
- Laura Mennell as Marlene Brenden
- Gary Hetherington as Arthur
- Julia Arkos as Lisa
- Barry Levy as Jim Scanlon
- Gordon Tipple as Sgt. Nevin
- Barry Bowman as Sgt. Reardon
- Kurt Max Runte as Jack Meldon
