= Heartstrings (Leighton Meester album) =

Studio album by Leighton Meester
- Released: October 28, 2014
- Recorded: 2012–2014
- Studio: Sage & Sound Studios; Atomic Halo Studios
- Genre: Pop rock; indie pop; alternative rock; folk; dream pop
- Length: 31:33
- Label: Vagrant; Hotly Wanting
- Producer: Jeff Trott

Singles from Heartstrings
- 1. "Heartstrings" Released: September 9, 2014

Professional ratings
Review scores
Source	Rating
AllMusic	4/5 stars

Heartstrings is the debut studio album by American singer-songwriter and actress Leighton Meester. It was released on October 28, 2014, by Vagrant and Hotly Wanting. Meester wrote all nine tracks featured on the record, and the album was produced by Jeff Trott. Following its release, Heartstrings received generally positive reviews.

== Promotion ==
=== Singles ===
"Heartstrings" was released as first single from album on September 9, 2014, via iTunes and SoundCloud. On October 17, 2014, Meester performed "Heartstrings" on Big Morning Buzz Live. On October 28, 2014, Heartstrings release party took place in Los Angeles at The Troubadour. The music video for Heartstrings was released on October 29, 2014.

=== Tour ===
In support of the album, Meester embarked on tour across North America, which began on January 6, 2015 in Los Angeles, California and ended on March 2, 2015 in San Francisco, California.

Tour dates
Date	City	Country	Venue
January 6, 2015	Los Angeles	United States	Hotel Café
January 11, 2015	Los Angeles	United States	Hotel Café
January 27, 2015	Los Angeles	United States	Hotel Café
January 28, 2015	Los Angeles	United States	Hotel Café
February 18, 2015	Alexandria	United States	Birchmere Music Hall
February 19, 2015	Philadelphia	United States	The Trocadero Theatre
February 20, 2015	Allston	United States	Brighton Music Hall
February 21, 2015	New York City	United States	Irving Plaza
February 23, 2015	Detroit	United States	Magic Bag
February 24, 2015	Chicago	United States	Park West
February 27, 2015	Seattle	United States	El Corazon
March 1, 2015	Vancouver	Canada	Rio Theatre
March 2, 2015	San Francisco	United States	Great American Music Hall

== Commercial performance ==
The album debuted on week dated of November 15, 2014, at number 1 on the Billboard Heatseekers Albums and at number 139 on the official Billboard 200.

== Track listing ==
All tracks are written by Leighton Meester.

Heartstrings track listing
No.	Title	Length
1.	"Heartstrings"	3:34
2.	"Run Away"	3:39
3.	"Good for One Thing"	2:48
4.	"Sweet"	3:40
5.	"On My Side"	3:18
6.	"L.A."	3:34
7.	"Dreaming"	3:49
8.	"Blue Afternoon"	3:57
9.	"Entitled"	3:14
Total length:		31:33

== Personnel ==
All credits adapted from the album's liner notes.

- Leighton Meester – vocals, composer
- Matt Chamberlain – drums, percussion
- Paul Bryon – bass
- Joel Shearer – guitar
- Dave Palmer – organ, keyboards
- Patrick Warren – orchestration, accordion, keyboards, piano
- Ryan Petersen – drum programming, percussion, additional keyboards
- Jeff Trott – bass, mandolin, keyboards, additional guitars, producer, engineer
- Shawn Everett – engineer
- John Cranfield – mixing
- Shahine Ezell – management

== Charts ==
Chart performance for Heartstrings
Chart (2014)	Peak position
US Billboard 200	139
US Heatseekers Albums (Billboard)	1

== Release history ==
Release formats for Heartstrings
Region	Date	Label	Format
United States	October 28, 2014	Vagrant; Hotly Wanting	Digital download
