= Drive-Thru (film) =

2007 American film by Brendan Cowles and Shane Kuhn

- Promotional release poster
- Directed by: Shane Kuhn; Brendan Cowles
- Written by: Shane Kuhn; Brendan Cowles
- Produced by: Martin Wiley; Chris Sievernich; Matt Milich
- Starring: Leighton Meester; Nicholas D'Agosto
- Cinematography: Vince Toto
- Edited by: Dan Padgett
- Music by: Ralph Rieckermann
- Production companies: D.H. Blair Pictures; Prospect Pictures; Armada Pictures; Lions Gate Films
- Distributed by: American World Pictures; Armada Pictures International; Lions Gate Entertainment
- Release date: May 29, 2007
- Running time: 91 minutes
- Country: United States
- Language: English

Drive-Thru is a 2007 American dark comedy slasher film directed and written by Brendan Cowles and Shane Kuhn, starring Leighton Meester and Nicholas D'Agosto. It is set in Orange County, California and involves an evil clown as a serial killer.

The film was released direct-to-video on May 29, 2007. The film received mixed reviews with critics praising its fun, campy horror style and creative fast-food-themed kills, while others criticize the plot for being confusing and the dialogue for being poorly written. Some find it a "so bad it's good" or "guilty pleasure" movie with an entertaining killer, while professional reviews and other viewers found it disjointed, derivative, and lacking substance.

== Plot ==
At the fast food restaurant Hella Burger, mascot Horny the Clown insults Brandon, Tony, and their girlfriends Brittany and Tiffany over the drive-thru intercom. Tony breaks into the restaurant to confront him. Brandon enters several minutes later and finds Tony with his head in the deep fryer. Horny appears and kills Brandon with a meat cleaver. He then goes outside and kills Brittany and Tiffany.

Meanwhile, Mackenzie and her boyfriend, Fisher, find a ouija board and decide to ask it what their future will hold, to which the ouija board spells out the license plate of Brandon's car. The next day at school, Horny ambushes Mackenzie's friend Val in the locker room. The school janitor, Lenny, finds and returns Mackenzie's camera, which she lost at the party. Mackenzie develops the photos, which show the dead bodies of the four murdered teenagers. Horny chases Mackenzie into the gymnasium, where she finds Val's head has been placed in a modified microwave that causes her head to explode. Horny chases Mackenzie throughout the school and she finds Lenny has been hanged, before bumping into a police officer, who does not find any bodies. Mackenzie is taken to a police station and questioned by Detectives Brenda Chase and Dwayne Crockers, who suspect Lenny to be the killer. The detectives visit Hella Burger's owner, Jack Benjamin, who proves to be no help in solving the case.

At a carnival haunted house where Mackenzie and Fisher are working, couple Chad and Tina are killed by Horny. Fisher, in shock after finding the bodies and encountering Horny, is taken to the hospital and visited by Mackenzie and her mother, Marcia. Mackenzie starts to think her mother is hiding something from her, as all the so far murdered teenagers are the children of her old high-school friends. Fisher escapes the hospital by drugging Crockers and later reunites with Mackenzie. Inside Hella Burger, Horny kills two stoners vandalizing the restaurant. Back home, Marcia tells Mackenzie that when she was young, she and her friends bullied Archie Benjamin, Jack's son and the original performer of Horny the Clown. On Archie's 18th birthday, which he celebrated at Hella Burger, they knocked him unconscious and when they left, a birthday candle lit the place on fire, burning Archie alive. Now, his vengeful spirit has returned from the dead to kill the children of his murderers. Later, Mackenzie and Fisher are attacked by Archie. While Mackenzie is knocked unconscious, Fisher manages to unmask him. Fisher's eyes become bloodshot upon looking at Archie's deformed face. Archie then hurls Fisher through a window. Chase and Crockers find Jack hiding from Archie and they arrest him believing that he is behind the murders.

Mackenzie wakes up in Hella Burger, tied to a chair with her mouth gagged and surrounded by the bodies of her friends. A birthday cake is in front of her, as it is now her 18th birthday. Archie douses her with gasoline. Marcia arrives and shoots Archie in the mouth, who in turn chokes her out. Mackenzie takes a drink of whiskey from a flask and holds it in her mouth. Archie torments her with a candle and she spits the whiskey at him, setting him on fire. Mackenzie and Marcia escape as Archie burns to death. Mackenzie and Marcia rush to the hospital to see Fisher only to discover he has escaped, having been possessed by Archie's spirit. At Hella Burger's drive-thru, Crockers is killed by Horny.

== Cast ==
- Leighton Meester as Mackenzie Carpenter
- Nicholas D'Agosto as Fisher Kent
- Melora Hardin as Marcia Carpenter
- Lola Glaudini as Detective Brenda Chase
- Larry Joe Campbell as Detective Dwayne Crockers
- Penn Badgley as Van
- Rachael Bella as Starfire
- Shedrack Anderson as Chuck Taylor
- Sean Whalen as Lenny
- Robert Curtis Brown as Bert McCandless
- John Gilbert as Jack Benjamin
- Maliabeth Johnson as Tina McCandless
- Clyde Kusatsu as Fred Kukizaki
- Edward DeRuiter as Brandon Meeks
- Van De La Plante as Horny the Clown / Archie Benjamin
- Sita Young as Val Espinoza
- Haven Lamoureux as Tony
- Paul Ganus as Bill Carpenter
- Sarah Buehler as Carrie
- Jessica Landon as Brittany
- Nicole Cavazos as Tiffany
- Morgan Spurlock as Robbie
- Gordon Clapp as Voice of Horny the Clown

== Production ==
Drive-Thru was written and directed by Brendan Cowles and Shane Kuhn. Cowles and Kuhn were two of the original organizers of the Slamdance Film Festival. Shane Kuhn received a master's degree in Screenwriting from the American Film Institute, but was relatively new to Hollywood, having previously written novels. After feeling unable to express his creativity the way he wanted to, he discontinued his work as a writer/director and returned to novel writing, as well as working in advertising and motion graphics. In an interview with Who Asked You?, Kuhn stated, "When I write a novel, the world is massive, the characters vivid, and there are almost no constraints. Screenwriting is constrained and technical. It’s very difficult to add deep layers to that kind of work. Movies are a directors’ medium, full stop. TV is different. Writers can live and breathe in that world, but not movies. You have a finite amount of time/pages and a very unforgiving story structure. Not to mention the fact that you might sell the damn thing only to have it sit on a shelf FOREVER. To me, screenwriting is like failing to follow Willy Wonka's Chocolate Factory rules. It's tempting, but a total waste of your golden ticket." On the contrary, Cowles continued to write several other screenplays after Drive-Thru, but did not direct any other films.

The writers of this film paid homage multiple times to John Carpenter's Halloween. Leighton Meester's character's name Mackenzie Carpenter is a clear reference to John Carpenter, in addition to a famous line spoken by Jamie Lee Curtis in the film ("Go down to the Mackenzie's and call the police.") Additionally when Fisher comes into the room, there is a point-of-view shot which bears a heavy resemblance to the intro of Halloween, and he is then seen in blue coveralls similar to those worn by Michael Myers.

Drive-Thru was shot in Los Angeles, California. Vincent E. Toto was the cinematographer. The year before, he was the cinematographer for another horror film, Dark Ride, which received a similar audience response. The camera used for this film was a Panavision Panaflex Gold II.

Editing was done by Daniel R. Padgett, who has worked in the editorial department of many films of different genres, including The Royal Tenenbaums and Space Jam.

== Release ==
The film was released on DVD by Lionsgate Home Entertainment on May 29, 2007, and in Canada by Maple Pictures on the same day.

Before Drive-Thru was released in the United States and Canada, it was released on DVD in Germany two months earlier, as well as being released on television in the UK on March 31, 2007. Besides these four 2007 releases, Drive-Thru went on to premiere in Mexico (May 2009) and Germany (May 2011).

Drive-Thru was released under several different titles depending on the country, such as Burger Kill (Canada and France), Fast Food Killer (Spain), and Death Burger (Japan). The USA working title of this film was Hellaburger.

== Reception ==
Popcorn Pictures gave the film a negative review, writing "Really hard to sit through despite the promise of a killer clown, Drive Thru is eighty-three minutes of pure fast food junk. Like a fast food burger, it may look good when you pick it up but as soon as you take your first bite, you realize you’ve made a horrible mistake and all you’ve got left is an ultimately fatty concoction of things that are bad for your health."

Dread Central panned the film calling the film's dialogue "painfully bad" and criticized the film's ending.

DVD Talk called it "routine slice and dice dreariness", criticizing its inadequate humor, "callous characterization", and lack of actual scares.

== Legacy ==
Drive-Thru continues to get the attention of horror film critics, having several film review articles and videos made about the film between 2019 and 2020. The film is often included in watch lists regarding killer clowns.

Drive-Thru was featured in two different episodes of Phelous & the Movies.

== See also ==
- List of horror films about clowns
