= Shahine Ezell =

- Born: Dallas, Texas
- Education: Booker T. Washington High School for the Performing and Visual Arts; California Institute of the Arts
- Occupations: Record producer, talent manager, actor, songwriter

Shahine Ezell (Dallas, Texas) is a film and television actor, record producer, talent manager and songwriter. Ezell is Leighton Meester's talent manager as well as the songwriter and record producer of "The Nomads". He attended Booker T. Washington High School for the Performing and Visual Arts and California Institute of the Arts for Acting.

He started his career on the television show Strong Medicine. Then moved on to work on movies: Driftwood (2006 film), Detention, Remember the Daze, and Days of Wrath. He also appeared on the NBC show Crossing Jordan. He now is working on Leighton Meester's debut album.
