= Good Cop/Bad Cop =

2025 dramedy television series

- Genre: Comedy drama; Police procedural
- Created by: John Quaintance
- Starring: Leighton Meester; Luke Cook; Devon Terrell; Clancy Brown
- Composer: Elliott Wheeler
- Countries of origin: United States; Australia
- Original language: English
- No. of seasons: 1
- No. of episodes: 8

Production
- Executive producers: Trent O'Donnell; John Quaintance; Chloe Rickard; Jeff Wachtel; Cailah Scobie; Amanda Duthie
- Cinematography: Eric Murray Lui; Tania Lambert; Tony O'Loughlan
- Editors: Gabe Dowrick; Ariel Shaw; Andrew Macneil
- Production companies: Future Shack Entertainment; Jungle Entertainment; ITV Studios

Original release
- Network: The CW; The Roku Channel; Stan
- Release: February 19 – April 9, 2025

Good Cop/Bad Cop is a comedy drama television series created by John Quaintance. It premiered on February 19, 2025, on The CW in the United States and Stan in Australia. In February 2026, the series was canceled after one season.

== Cast and characters ==
=== Main ===
- Leighton Meester as Det. Lou Hickman, a seven-year veteran of the Eden Vale P.D. who was the sole detective of her small town police force until she convinced her father, the Chief of Police, to hire some help. Due to her department's small budget, Lou leans on her sunny disposition to solve the varied crimes in town. She harbours feelings for Shane.
- Luke Cook as Det. Henry Hickman, Lou's younger brother and Big Hank's estranged son who left home after writing an editorial criticizing his father. He returns to Eden Vale after being offered a promotion to detective by his father—a promotion he was unable to secure while working on the Seattle Police Department due to his lack of interpersonal skills and terrible bedside manner. He is still in love with his ex-girlfriend Dr. Marci Laine who he left years prior to pursue his career in Seattle.
- Devon Terrell as Det. Shane Carson, a member of the County Sheriff's Department who frequently works with Lou when she works outside the Eden Vale city limits. He is divorced from his wife and has romantic feelings for Lou. He is able to help Lou and Henry's investigations due to the county's bigger budget and advanced technology.
- Clancy Brown as Big Hank Hickman, the chief of police in Eden Vale and father of Lou and Henry. He freely admits to redrawing the town borders to ensure that his town is considered low-crime, as well as routinely providing favors for his friends.

=== Supporting ===
- Blazey Best as Nadia Drozdova, Big Hank's Russian girlfriend who has a love for American television.
- Scott Lee as Officer Joe Bradley, a former high school football star and juvenile delinquent.
- William McKenna as Officer Sam Szczepkowski, a member of the Eden Vale P.D. who Lou personally recruited due to his tech talents.
- Shamita Siva as Officer Sarika Ray, a member of the Eden Vale P.D. and a veteran of the United States Marine Corps. She runs the local Scout troop.
- Grace Chow as Lily Lim, Eden Vale P.D.'s dispatcher who is into film and media.
- Jeanette Cronin as Gladys, a woman who runs the local diner that Lou and Henry frequent.
- Philippa Northeast as Dr. Marci Laine, Henry's ex-girlfriend who he left to pursue a career in Seattle. She now has a son and is a single mother. She shares Henry's lack of social skills.
- Lincoln Lewis as Bobby Dougan, Lou's on/off fling.

== Episodes ==
No.	Title	Directed by	Written by	Original release date	U.S. viewers (millions)
1	"Peace in the Valley"	Trent O'Donnell	John Quaintance	February 19, 2025	0.42
2	"The King's Assassin"	Gracie Otto	John Quaintance	February 26, 2025	0.28
3	"Mr. Popular"	Gracie Otto	Steve Joe	March 5, 2025	0.26
4	"Found Footage"	Corrie Chen	Julia de Fina	March 12, 2025	0.35
5	"Family Trees"	Anne Renton	Phil Lloyd	March 19, 2025	0.36
6	"Explosions"	Anne Renton	Steve Toltz	March 26, 2025	0.34
7	"Buckle Up"	Corrie Chen	Clare Sladden	April 2, 2025	0.31
8	"Skeletons"	Anne Renton	John Quaintance; Sarinah Masukor	April 9, 2025	0.35

== Production ==
First announced in March 2024, production took place in Canungra, Australia, and the Village Roadshow Studios using a mostly Australian cast. On February 13, 2026, Luke Cook revealed on his TikTok account that the series had been canceled after one season.

== Release ==
Good Cop/Bad Cop premiered on February 19, 2025, on The CW in the United States and Stan in Australia. All eight episodes were released on Amazon Prime Video on July 11, 2025.

== Reception ==
=== Critical response ===
The review aggregator website Rotten Tomatoes reports a 91% approval rating, based on 11 critic reviews. Metacritic, which uses a weighted average, assigned a score of 70 out of 100 based on 8 critics, indicating "generally favorable" reviews.

=== Ratings ===
Viewership and ratings per episode of Good Cop/Bad Cop
No.	Title	Air date	Rating/share (18–49)	Viewers (millions)	DVR (18–49)	DVR viewers (millions)	Total (18–49)	Total viewers (millions)	Ref.
1	"Peace in the Valley"	February 19, 2025	0.0/0	0.418	0.0	0.270	0.0	0.688	
2	"The King's Assassin"	February 23, 2025	0.0/0	0.284	0.0	0.264	0.0	0.548	
3	"Mr. Popular"	March 5, 2025	0.0/0	0.264	0.0	0.246	0.0	0.518	
4	"Found Footage"	March 12, 2025	0.0/0	0.346	0.0	0.292	0.1	0.638	
5	"Family Trees"	March 19, 2025	0.0/0	0.364	0.0	0.239	0.1	0.602	
6	"Explosions"	March 26, 2025	0.1/1	0.340	0.0	0.286	0.1	0.634	
7	"Buckle Up"	April 2, 2025	0.0/0	0.305	0.0	0.321	0.0	0.626	
8	"Skeletons"	April 9, 2025	0.0/0	0.345	0.0	0.264	0.0	0.609	

=== Accolades ===
Good Cop/Bad Cop won the jury prize at the 2025 Monte-Carlo Television Festival.

Good Cop/Bad Cop received four #TVWEEKLogies nominations - for Best Scripted Comedy Program, Best Lead Actor in a Comedy (Clancy Brown and Luke Cook), and Best Lead Actress in a Comedy (Leighton Meester).
