= Vanessa Curry =

American model, dancer and singer (born 1990)

- Born: Vanessa Curry; 1990 (age 35–36); Fremont, California, U.S.
- Education: Moreau Catholic High School
- Occupations: Model; dancer; singer-songwriter

Vanessa Curry (born c. 1990 in Fremont, California) is an American model, dancer, and singer.

== Career ==
Curry was a Laker girl in the 2007–08 season. She was a member of the third and fourth line-up of The Pussycat Dolls (2010–12) and graduated from Moreau Catholic High School in Hayward, California.

Apart from performing as a vocalist, dancer and rapper for the Dolls, Curry recorded the song, "Watch Me" directed by James McCloud for FROCK Los Angeles LLC. On January 17, 2012, a music video for "Watch Me" was posted on YouTube. On August 14 of the same year the band, Nomads published in their YouTube channel the song "Addicted to Love" featuring Vanessa Curry with Leighton Meester and Wilmer Valderrama who was also the director with Andrew Sandler.

Curry appeared with The Pussycat Dolls' fourth line-up debuting on February 5, 2012, during the Super Bowl, as part of GoDaddy’s annual TV commercial, appearing with Danica Patrick.

Curry was on Dancing with the Stars as a dancer for Pitbull.

== Sources ==
- Da Silva Villarrubia, Santiago Katriel (May 21, 2008). "Vanessa Curry Is Kobe Bryant's Affair?". The Dirty. Jeanette. Archived from the original on May 5, 2013.
- Da Silva Villarrubia, Santiago Katriel (November 7, 2011). "Robin Antin Gives Real Details About the New Pussycat Dolls". Sam Lansky. PopCrush.com.
