= Laker Girls =

American basketball cheerleading squad

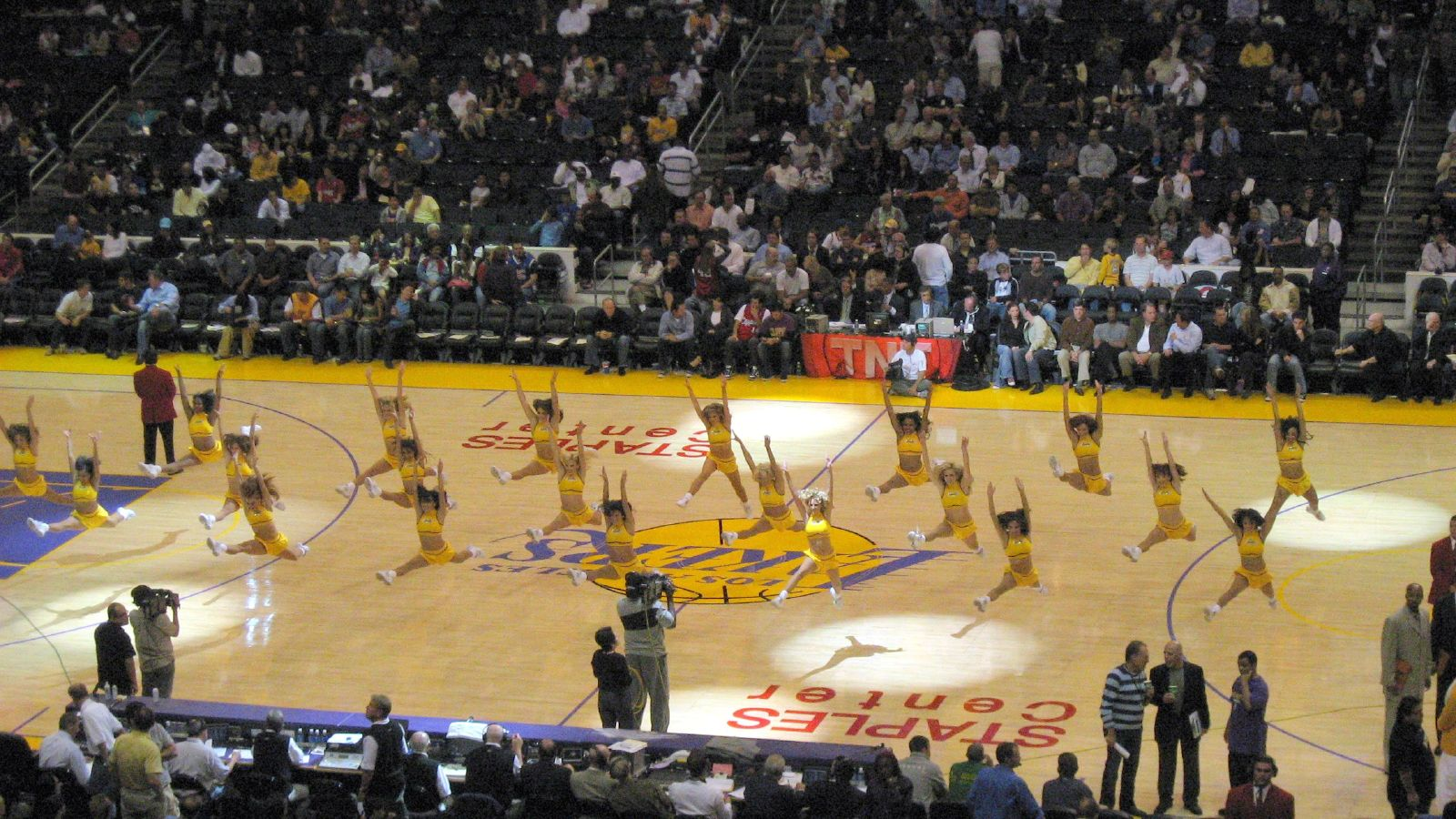
The Laker Girls performing during a time out.

The Laker Girls are a National Basketball Association Cheerleading squad that supports the Los Angeles Lakers basketball team at home games. They also perform at many other events and venues.

== History ==
Jerry Buss commissioned the Laker Girls in 1979 after he had purchased the Lakers. He believed a basketball game should be entertaining, and he was a big fan of college basketball. Cheerleaders were not common in the NBA at the time, but Buss ordered the formation of the squad—a team of top female dancers who were as talented as they were sexy—as part of his vision for Showtime. "I thought the game itself was fantastic, but the ambiance was really kind of dead. It was quiet and boring, and so I thought what I'd like to do is spice it up with having some dancers," he explained.

The Laker Girls are a semi-professional squad and members hold regular day jobs ranging from professional dancers to waitresses and university professors. The squad typically performs about 30 routines over the course of the season. They are also local ambassadors for the Lakers organization and local advocates for female empowerment in the Los Angeles area.

The Laker Girls hold auditions in July of every year. Each current member of the squad must also audition to keep her place on the team. Each woman auditioning must come with a resume of her previous jobs. Each candidate must come prepared with her own routine and is taught two routines to perform for the current Laker Girls and other judges. Dance skills are the main criterion on which they are judged, but personality, style, and teamwork are also important.

Laker Girl Paula Abdul was discovered by The Jacksons, who hired her to choreograph the music video for the song "Torture". This led to her doing the choreography for the band's Victory Tour, and Abdul became a notable music video choreographer for other artists before launching a successful career as singer. Abdul's success has given an extra prestige to being a Laker Girl.

== In Media ==
A television movie named Laker Girls, starring Tina Yothers (from TV's Family Ties) and Alexandra Paul (Baywatch) aired in 1990, detailing the fictional tribulations of a trio of acolytes trying out to become members of the cheer leading troupe.

== Notable former cheerleaders ==
Many former Laker Girl cheerleaders have gone on to achieve success in entertainment and other notable occupation. They include:

- Paula Abdul (singer, actress)
- Taylour Paige (dancer)
- Robyn Semien (producer)
- Shelby Rabara (actress)
- Vanessa Curry (dancer)
- Moon Bloodgood (actress)
- Lisa Joann Thompson (choreographer)
- Tina Landon (choreographer)
- Emily Harper (actress)
- Carmella (wrestler)
- Anne Fletcher (actress, director)
