= Leighton Meester =

American actress (born 1986)

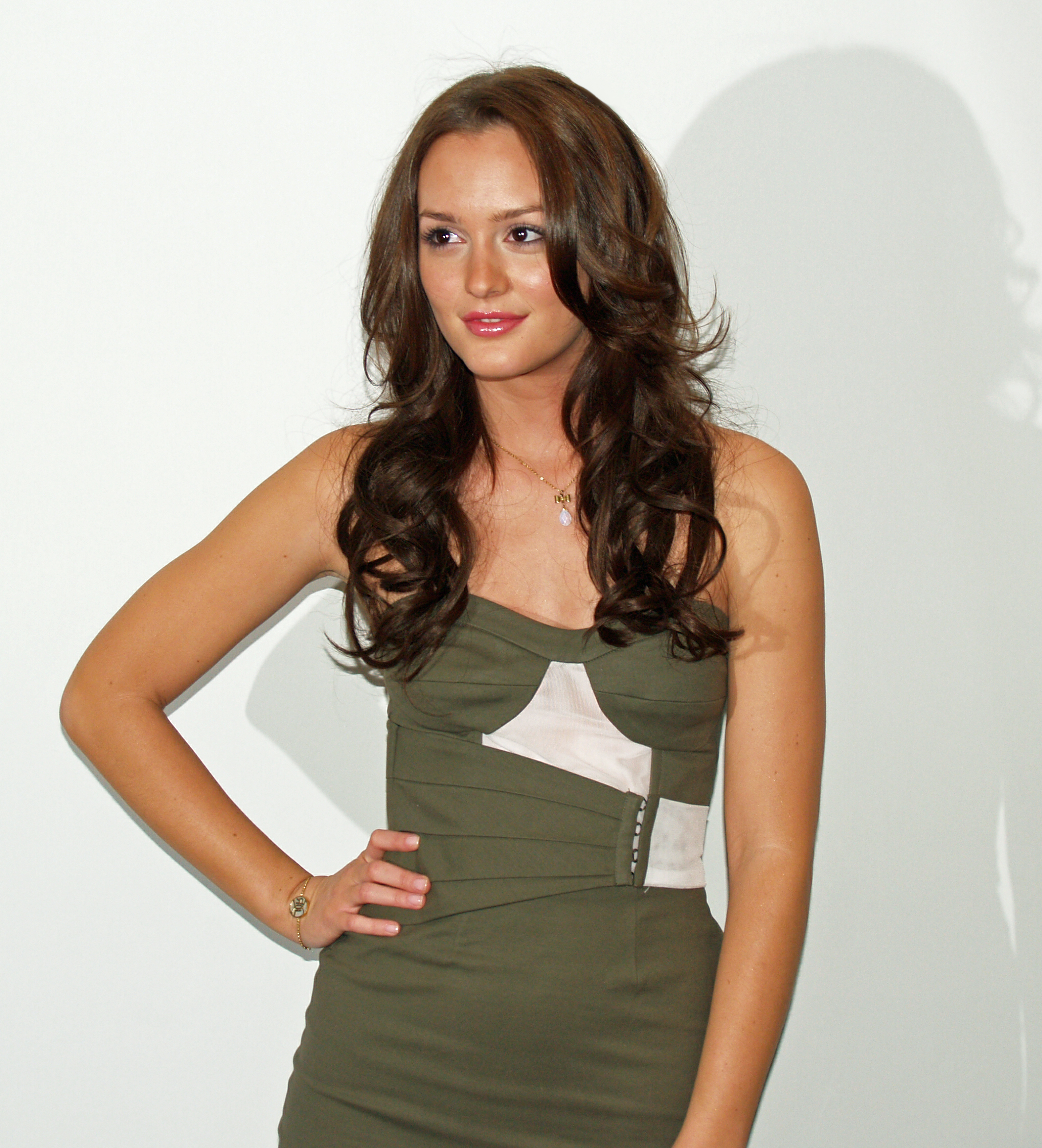
- Meester in 2009
- Born: Leighton Marissa Meester; April 9, 1986 (age 40); Fort Worth, Texas, U.S.
- Occupations: Actress; singer; model
- Years active: 1999–present
- Spouse: Adam Brody (m. 2014)
- Children: 2
- Musical career
- Genres: Pop rock; indie pop; alternative rock
- Instruments: Vocals; guitar
- Labels: Universal Republic; Vagrant; Hotly Wanting

Leighton Marissa Meester (/ˈleɪtən/ LAY-tən; born April 9, 1986) is an American actress, singer, and model. She is known for her starring role as Blair Waldorf on The CW television series Gossip Girl (2007–2012). She has also appeared in films such as Killer Movie (2008), Country Strong (2010), The Roommate (2011), Monte Carlo (2011), The Oranges (2011), The Judge (2014), The Weekend Away (2022), and EXmas (2023). She portrayed Angie D'Amato on the ABC sitcom Single Parents (2018–2020). Meester made her Broadway debut in Of Mice and Men (2014). For her leading role in The CW/Stan comedy drama series Good Cop/Bad Cop (2025), Meester was nominated for the Australian Logie Award for Best Actress.

In addition to acting, Meester has ventured into music. In 2009, she was featured as a guest vocalist on the Cobra Starship single "Good Girls Go Bad", which charted in the top 10 on the Billboard Hot 100. She released solo singles "Somebody to Love" (2009) and "Your Love's a Drug" (2010) on the Universal Republic label. Meester has also recorded songs for various soundtracks. Her debut studio album, Heartstrings, was independently released in 2014. She has also modeled, having been the face of the Jimmy Choo, Herbal Essences, and Vera Wang brands.

== Early life and education ==
Meester was born April 9, 1986, in Fort Worth, Texas, to Constance Lynn (née Haas), a screenwriter, and Douglas Jay Meester, a real estate broker. She has an older brother, Douglas Logan (born 1983), and a younger brother, Alexander "Lex" (born 1994). Their mother is of Irish descent, while their father has Dutch ancestry. At the time of her birth, Meester's parents were serving time in a federal prison for their involvement in a drug ring that smuggled marijuana from Jamaica to the United States. Constance was able to give birth to Leighton in a hospital and nurse her for three months in a halfway house, before returning to prison to complete her sentence. Her paternal grandparents cared for Meester during this period. She has maintained that her parents gave her a normal upbringing and, despite their criminal past, has stated, "It made me realize that you can't judge anyone—especially your parents—for what they've done in their past, because people change." She grew up in Marco Island, Florida, where she participated in productions at a local playhouse. Her parents separated in 1992.

When she was 11 years old, Meester and her siblings moved with their mother to New York City. She attended the Professional Children's School and began working as a model with Wilhelmina, booking a Ralph Lauren campaign shot by Bruce Weber, and working with then-photographer Sofia Coppola. Meester also booked commercials for Tamagotchi and Clearasil, and modeled for Limited Too alongside Amanda Seyfried. At age 14, she relocated to Los Angeles and attended Hollywood and Beverly Hills High Schools. Meester then transferred to a small private school and graduated a year early.

== Career ==
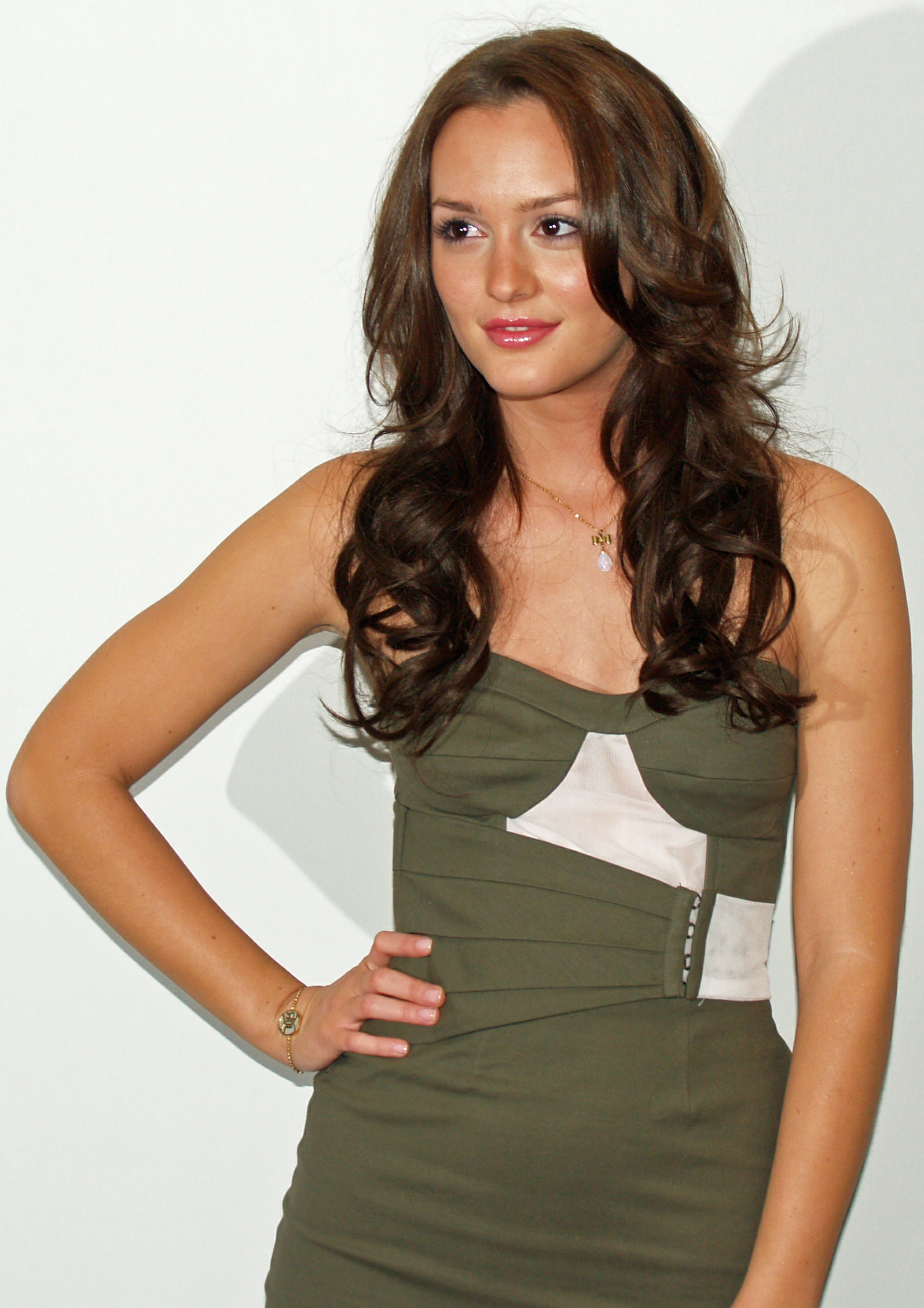
Meester at the premiere of Killer Movie at Tribeca Film Festival in 2008

=== 1999–2006: Beginnings ===
Meester made her television acting debut in 1999 as a murder victim's friend, Alyssa Turner, on an episode of Law & Order. Following this, she made her film debut as Elisha Springfield in Hangman's Curse (2003), based on the bestselling book by Frank Peretti. She had a series regular role in Tarzan in 2003, which aired for only eight episodes, a recurring role in Entourage as Justine Chapin, and played Carrie Bishop in Veronica Mars in 2004 and 2005. Meester booked guest roles in the series Crossing Jordan, 8 Simple Rules, 7th Heaven, and 24. She was cast as series regular in Surface as Savannah Barnett.

In 2006, Meester appeared in two films, Flourish and Inside. She also guest starred in an episode of Numbers and appeared in two episodes of House as Ali Johnson, a teenager with a crush on Gregory House. She then had guest roles on CSI: Miami and Shark, and portrayed the female lead in the horror film Drive-Thru (2007), for which she recorded the song "Inside the Black." Meester was cast as identical twin sisters Kayla and Kelly Rhodes in the ABC crime-drama series Secrets of a Small Town, but the network decided not to forward the series.

=== 2007–2013: Gossip Girl and music ventures ===
In 2007, Meester was cast in The CW's teen drama series Gossip Girl as Blair Waldorf, based on the book series of the same name by Cecily von Ziegesar. She first auditioned for the role of Serena van der Woodsen, but told the producers she could better play Blair. However, it was important that Serena was blonde and Blair was brunette, so Meester dyed her hair brown for the role. Her performance was the most critically acclaimed of the show, with Blair being cited as the series' breakout character. She also garnered media attention for her wardrobe on the show. The series ended after six seasons and 120 episodes. Meester later starred in the television film The Haunting of Sorority Row, and had a role in the ensemble comedy-drama film Remember the Daze (2007). In 2008, she appeared in the horror-thriller film Killer Movie and reprised her role in Entourage, singing with Tony Bennett in the episode. That same year, FHM magazine ranked her #1 on their list of "Fall TV's Hottest Stars". She was also ranked on Maxim magazine's "Hot 100 of 2008" and "Hot 100 of 2009" lists.

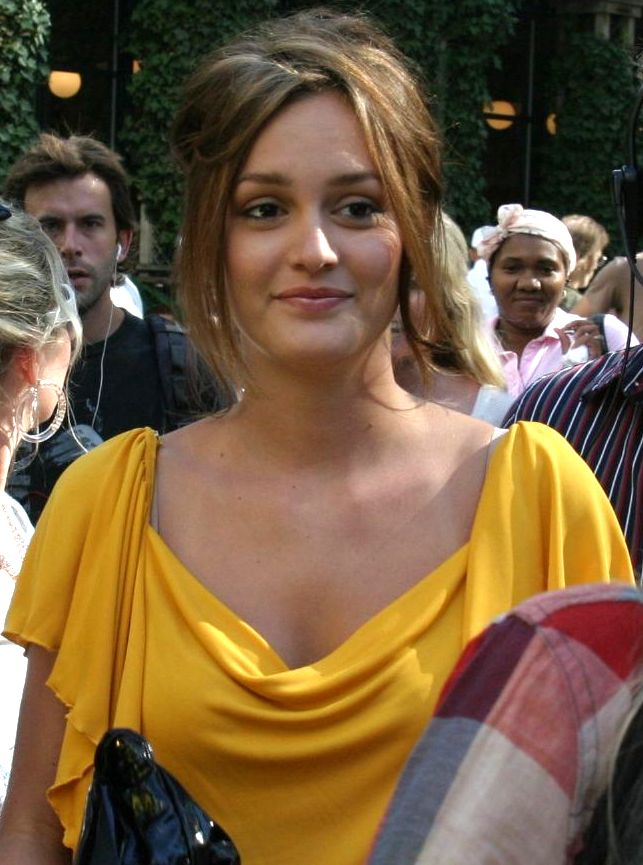
Meester at New York Fashion Week in September 2008

Early in 2009, Meester partnered with Reebok to model their new Top Down sneakers. Apart from Gossip Girl, Meester worked with co-star Ed Westwick in a Nikon Coolpix series camera advertisement, and both were the faces of the Korean clothing line ASK Enquired. In April 2009, she released the song "Birthday" featuring duo Awesome New Republic. A version without her vocals was included on their Rational Geographic Vol. I album. Later that month, Meester signed a recording contract with Universal Republic. Meester provided vocals on Cobra Starship's song "Good Girls Go Bad", which peaked at number seven on the Billboard Hot 100. In July, "Body Control" surfaced on the internet. Meester's first official single, "Somebody to Love", featuring R&B singer Robin Thicke, was released for airplay on October 13, 2009, and became available for digital download the next day. She recorded a cover of the song "Christmas (Baby Please Come Home)" for the compilation album A Very Special Christmas 7. Her second single, "Your Love's a Drug", was digitally released on March 30, 2010. She is also featured on Stephen Jerzak's song "She Said". Meester did a duet with DJ Clinton Sparks on "Front Cut", which appeared on the internet in February 2011. Lil Wayne worked with her on an unreleased song titled "Make It Rain", and Jesse McCartney wrote her another song. The album was produced by Polow Da Don, Harvey Mason Jr., and Spencer Nezey. Meester began working on it in March 2009, and the album was initially projected to be released in the fall of 2009, but was later delayed to early 2010. It was pushed back again to late 2010, and was ultimately shelved.

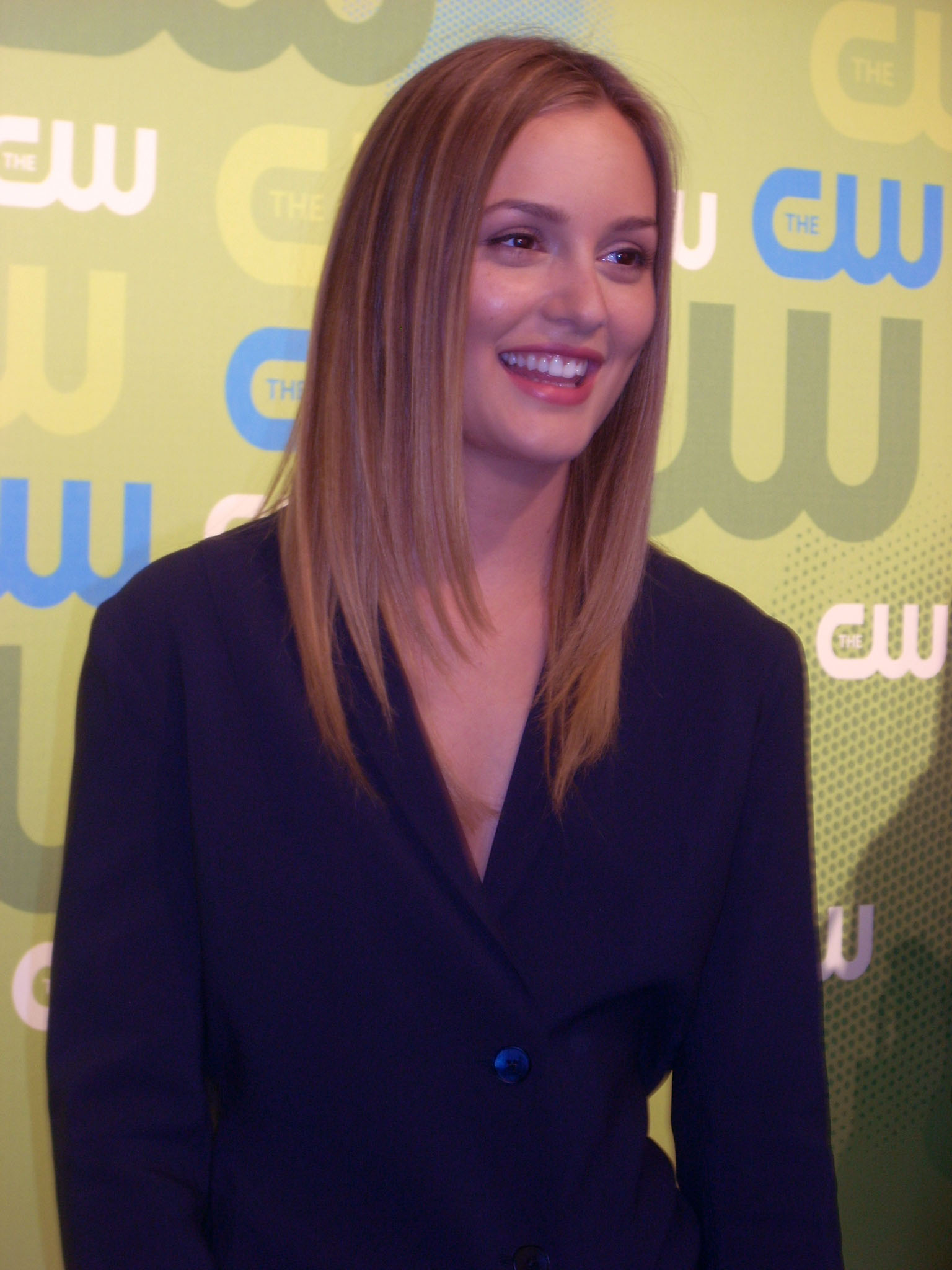
Meester in 2009

Meester had small roles in the comedies Date Night (2010) and Going the Distance (2010). She then starred with Gwyneth Paltrow and Garrett Hedlund in the country music drama Country Strong (2010). Wesley Morris of The Boston Globe described Meester as the best part of the film, writing, "She's just doing Reese Witherspoon's June Carter Cash in Walk the Line with dabs of Miley Cyrus and Kellie Pickler. But it's not an impersonation; it's a performance with its own comedy and sweetness." Claudia Puig of USA Today was also positive, stating "Meester shows she can do more than play one of Gossip Girl's privileged Manhattan socialites." For the film, Meester recorded a cover of the song "Words I Couldn't Say" by Rascal Flatts as well as "A Little Bit Stronger" by Sara Evans featured on the film's soundtrack; a promotional single titled "Summer Girl"; and a duet with Garrett Hedlund titled "Give In To Me". After wrapping, she received a guitar from Tim McGraw and decided to learn how to play it. In October 2010, Meester said she had been working with a band called Check in the Dark and had been writing for the last six months after being inspired by Country Strong. She revealed her influences, saying, "I love Neil Young and Joni Mitchell, that style of music, and as far as songwriting I think that's where my heart is."

In 2010, Meester signed on to be the spokesperson for Herbal Essences hair products. That same year, she took part in Bulgari's humanitarian efforts for the Save the Children organization with Isabella Rossellini and Maribel Verdú. Next, she fronted a beauty campaign for Korean brand eSpoir. Vera Wang selected her to be the face of the fragrance Lovestruck in 2011, stating that Meester's "beauty, talent and spirit will inspire all the young women that I hope will enjoy this passionate, new young fragrance." The next year, Meester shot a campaign for the follow-up fragrance, Lovestruck Floral Rush. Italian fashion house Missoni named Meester the face of their spring/summer 2011 campaign.

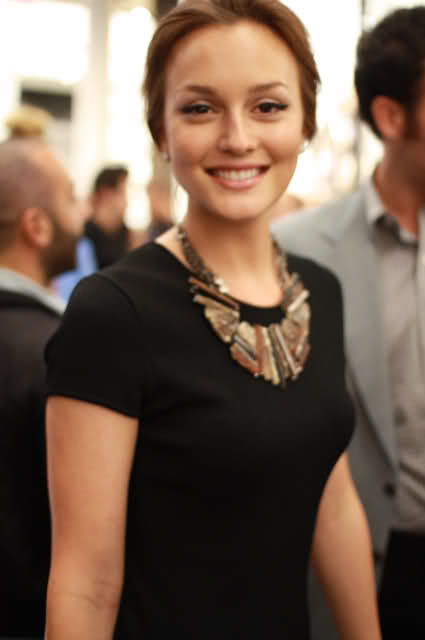
Meester in September 2010

Meester then starred in the thriller film The Roommate (2011) as Rebecca Evans, an obsessive, bipolar woman. Though the film received mainly negative reviews, Meester's portrayal was praised. Entertainment Weekly found she was the only one to bring "the slightest trace of something fascinating to her role," while Los Angeles Times wrote, "[Meester's] performance often has the feeling of a sports car in neutral. When she punches it for quick changes of tone from manic to wounded or around the bend, she shows how much more she is capable of." In the teen comedy film Monte Carlo (2011), Meester portrayed Meg Kelly, Selena Gomez's character's stepsister and Katie Cassidy's character's friend. Movieline noted, "As in Country Strong, Meester's crack timing and irresistible poignancy illuminate a part that would leave other actresses simpering themselves off the screen." Her final film of the year, The Oranges (2011), opposite Hugh Laurie and Adam Brody, premiered at the Toronto International Film Festival (TIFF). Meester's performance was again met with positive reviews, with the San Francisco Chronicle writing that she "succeeds in embodying all that is alluring and alarming about a 24-year-old woman."

In April 2012, Meester announced via Twitter (now X) a five-city tour with Check in the Dark, which started May 29 and ended June 4, 2012. Reflecting on her past pop collaborations, she said she "loved" them, but that folk music was "a lot closer to [her] heart." In May 2012, she endorsed the Philippine clothing brand Penshoppe's campaign All Stars. In June, Meester said she and the band had recorded all the songs for an album that served as a demo.

She then starred in the comedy film That's My Boy, alongside Adam Sandler, Andy Samberg, and Milo Ventimiglia, which released in June 2012. The film received mainly negative reviews, was nominated for eight Golden Raspberry Awards, and was a box office failure, grossing less than $58 million, failing to recoup its production budget of $70 million. In August 2012, Meester, Wilmer Valderrama, and Vanessa Curry appeared in house music group The Nomads' music video for "Addicted to Love". She was unavailable to reprise her role as Carrie Bishop in the film Veronica Mars (2014) due to scheduling issues, and was replaced by singer Andrea Estella of the band Twin Sister. In October 2013, Biotherm, a French luxury skincare company, announced Meester as its new global ambassador.

=== 2014–2017: Broadway debut and Heartstrings ===
In April 2014, her comedy film Life Partners premiered at the Tribeca Film Festival. It follows the friendship between a lesbian (Meester) and a straight woman (Gillian Jacobs) who begin a new relationship. Meester made her Broadway debut in the stage adaptation of John Steinbeck's 1937 novel Of Mice and Men, starring opposite James Franco and Chris O'Dowd. The production filmed and broadcast in cinemas for one night through National Theatre Live, the first Broadway production to be selected by the program. She then appeared opposite Robert Downey, Jr., Robert Duvall, and Vera Farmiga in the David Dobkin-directed comedy-drama film The Judge, which premiered at the TIFF and released in October 2014. Meester next appeared in Like Sunday, Like Rain (2014) directed by Frank Whaley, playing the girlfriend of Green Day singer Billie Joe Armstrong, and By the Gun (2014), alongside Ben Barnes. She won the Best Actress Award for Like Sunday, Like Rain at the 2014 Williamsburg Independent Film Festival. She was also the face of French brand Naf Naf's autumn/winter 2014 collection.

On September 9, 2014, it was announced her debut album, Heartstrings, would be released independently through her own label, Hotly Wanting, on October 28. The nine-song LP was written by Meester and produced by Jeff Trott. Its style was compared to ethereal singer-songwriters such as Tori Amos and Joni Mitchell. The music video for the eponymous title track "Heartstrings" was released on October 29.

In 2015, Meester embarked on a tour to support the album, which began on January 6 in Los Angeles, California, and ended on March 2 in San Francisco, California. Later that year, she appeared in advertisements for the Malaysian fashion brand Jimmy Choo. Meester was one of the 100 celebrity narrators featured in the documentary Unity (2015), which had a limited theatrical release. In March 2016, she was cast in Fox's comedy series Making History as Deborah Revere, a colonial woman from 1775 and the daughter of American artisan Paul Revere. The series was cancelled after one season.

=== 2018–present: Guest roles and The Buccaneers ===
In January 2018, Meester joined the cast of Semper Fi, starring alongside Jai Courtney, Nat Wolff, and Finn Wittrock, which was released in October 2019. Meester starred in the ABC sitcom Single Parents alongside Taran Killam, which premiered in September 2018 and was cancelled after two seasons. In 2018, Meester had a guest role on The Last Man on Earth and in 2019, she was a guest star in an episode of The Orville titled "Lasting Impressions" as Laura Huggins. She reprised the role in the 2022 episode "Twice in a Lifetime".

In 2022, she appeared in How I Met Your Father in the recurring role of Meredith, starred in the thriller film The Weekend Away, and voiced a role in the animated film My Father's Dragon. She then starred in the holiday film EXmas (2023). In October 2024, she was announced to be joining the cast of The Buccaneers for season two. In September 2025, it was announced that Meester would star in a Netflix film adaptation of Katherine Center's novel The Bodyguard, opposite Jared Padalecki. In October 2025, it was teased that Meester would make a guest appearance in season two of Netflix's series Nobody Wants This, which stars her real-life husband Adam Brody and Kristen Bell.

== Philanthropy ==
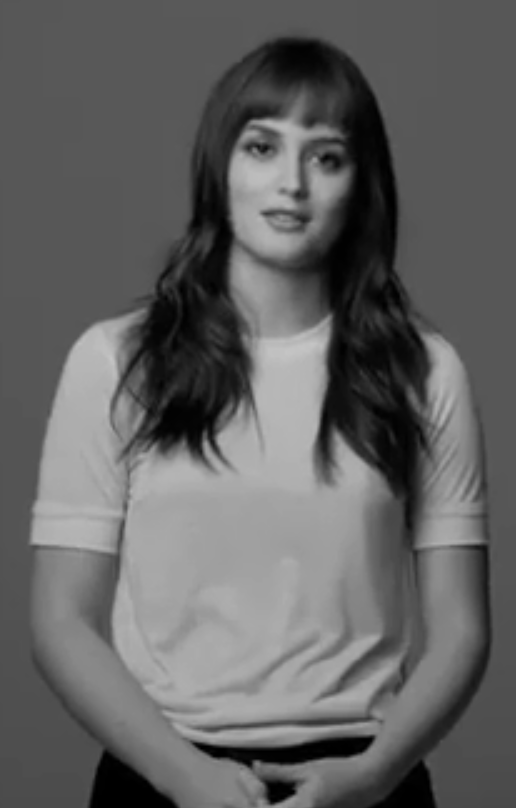
Meester for DKMS in 2013

Meester has participated in several charitable campaigns. In 2008, she was a spokesperson for Sunsilk's "Life Can't Wait" campaign, which aimed at motivating women to pursue their dreams. She also collaborated with Safe Horizon in 2009 to raise awareness about domestic violence. In 2015, Meester auctioned off fashion and accessories in a charity auction on eBay. The proceeds benefited Many Hopes, a charity organization that builds schools and homes for children in Kenya.

Meester has volunteered with the non-profit organization Feeding America since 2017. During her first two years working with Feeding America, she volunteered at Los Angeles' Downtown Women's Center and assisted with relief efforts in Puerto Rico after Hurricane Maria in 2017. Meester and Adam Brody also worked at Para Los Niños Charter School in Los Angeles, where they helped the organization serve lunches to children. In January 2019, she participated in Feeding America's campaign with Subway and Shamrock Farms.

In 2021, to encourage donations to help people with congenital central hypoventilation syndrome (CHS), Meester started promoting meetings on the Omaze network ("Win a Coffee Date with Leighton Meester").

== Personal life ==
=== Legal ===
In July 2011, Meester and her mother, Constance, filed lawsuits against each other over Meester's financial support of her younger brother, Alexander, who has multiple health problems. Meester's suit claimed her mother used the money she sent for her brother's care on "cosmetic procedures", such as botox and hair extensions. Her mother's suit made a counterclaim alleging breach of contract and physical abuse. Constance claimed a verbal contract was in place under which Meester had promised $10,000 a month, rather than the $7,500 she received. Her mother also claimed she was due a larger sum in return for "sacrific[ing] her happiness" when she moved Meester to Los Angeles as a child to pursue acting. In court, the judge dismissed this claim. Constance accused her daughter of calling social services and fabricating a claim that she was abusing Alexander; investigators interviewed Meester and found no merit in the complaint. In November 2011, Constance dropped the $3 million claim for damages. Meester said she would be willing to pay for her brother's medical expenses and school tuition, but denied agreeing to pay $10,000 per month, which she called a "ridiculous claim". Meester obtained a default judgment on December 7, 2011. In June 2012, Meester won the lawsuit, with the judge rejecting the claims in her mother's counter-suit.

=== Relationships ===
Meester dated American actor Aaron Himelstein in 2007 after meeting on the set of Remember the Daze. She then dated actor Sebastian Stan from 2008 to 2010. In November 2011, Meester and Himelstein briefly rekindled their relationship, later breaking up in 2012.

In November 2013, she became engaged to actor Adam Brody, with whom she filmed The Oranges in March 2010. The couple were married in a private ceremony on February 15, 2014. Their first child, a daughter named Arlo, was born on August 4, 2015. In April 2020, it was reported that the couple were expecting their second child. In September 2020, Brody confirmed their second child, a son, was born. Meester and Brody reside in Los Angeles. In January 2025, their home was destroyed by the Palisades Fire.

== Filmography ==
=== Film ===
Film work
Year	Title	Role	Notes
2003	The Jackalope	Lorraine	Short film
2003	Hangman's Curse	Elisha Springfield	
2006	Flourish	Lucy Covner	
2006	Inside	Josie	
2007	Drive-Thru	Mackenzie Carpenter	
2007	Remember the Daze	Tori	
2008	Killer Movie	Jaynie Hansen	
2010	Date Night	Katy	
2010	Going the Distance	Amy	
2010	Country Strong	Chiles Stanton	
2011	The Roommate	Rebecca Evans	
2011	Monte Carlo	Meg Kelly	
2011	The Oranges	Nina Ostroff	
2012	That's My Boy	Jamie Martin	
2014	Life Partners	Sasha Weiss	
2014	The Judge	Carla Powell	
2014	Like Sunday, Like Rain	Eleanor Logan	
2014	By the Gun	Ali Matazano	
2015	Unity	Narrator (voice)	Documentary film
2018	The North Winds Gift	The Mother	Short film
2019	Semper Fi	Clara	
2022	The Weekend Away	Beth Jenner	
2022	My Father's Dragon	Sasha the Tiger (voice)	
2023	River Wild	Joey Reese	Direct-to-video film
2023	EXmas	Ali Moyer	
2026	Basic	Kaylinn	Also executive producer
2026	Guarding Stars	Hannah Brooks	

=== Television ===
Television work
Year	Title	Role	Notes
1999	Law & Order	Alyssa Turner	Episode: "Disciple"
2001	Boston Public	Sarah Breen	Episode: "Chapter Twenty-Eight"
2002	Once and Again	Amanda	Episode: "Gardenia"
2002	Family Affair	Irene	Episode: "No Small Parts"
2003	Tarzan	Nicki Porter	Five episodes
2004	Crossing Jordan	Marie Strand	Episode: "Missing Pieces"
2004	7th Heaven	Kendall	Two episodes
2004	North Shore	Veronica Farrell	Episode: "Pilot"
2004–2008	Entourage	Justine Chapin	Three episodes
2005	24	Debbie Pendleton	Four episodes
2005	Veronica Mars	Carrie Bishop	Two episodes
2005	8 Simple Rules	Nikki Alcott	Episode: "The After Party"
2005–2006	Surface	Savannah Barnett	12 episodes
2006	Monster Allergy	Poppy (voice)	Episode: "House of Monsters"
2006	Numbers	Karen Camden	Episode: "Dark Matter"
2006	House	Ali Johnson	Two episodes
2007	CSI: Miami	Heather Crowley	Episode: "Broken Home"
2007	Shark	Megan	Three episodes
2007–2012	Gossip Girl	Blair Waldorf	Main role; 121 episodes
2007	The Haunting of Sorority Row	Samantha "Sam" Willows	Television film
2010	The City	Herself	Episode: "The Belle of Elle"
2016	Zoolander: Super Model	Herself	Television film
2017	Making History	Deborah Revere	Main role; nine episodes
2018	The Last Man on Earth	Zoe	Episode: "Karl"
2018–2020	Single Parents	Angie D'Amato	Main role; 45 episodes
2019, 2022	The Orville	Laura Huggins	Two episodes
2022–2023	How I Met Your Father	Meredith	Eight episodes
2025	Good Cop/Bad Cop	Lou Hickman	Main role
2025	The Buccaneers	Nell Wolfe	Season two
2025	Nobody Wants This	Abby	Episode: "Abby Loves Smoothies"
2025	I Love LA	Alyssa	Recurring role

== Stage ==
Leighton Meester stage work
Year	Title	Role	Notes
2014	Of Mice and Men	Curley's Wife	Longacre Theatre

== Discography ==
Leighton Meester studio albums
Title	Album details	Peak positions	
Title	Album details	US	US Heat.
Heartstrings	Released: October 28, 2014; Label: Hotly Wanting; Formats: Digital download	139	1

Leighton Meester singles
Title	Year	Peak chart positions		Album
Title	Year	US Bub.	US Heat.	Album
"Somebody to Love" (featuring Robin Thicke)	2009	11	13	Non-album singles
"Your Love's a Drug"	2010	19	14	Non-album singles
"Heartstrings"	2014	—	—	Heartstrings
"—" denotes a recording that did not chart or was not released in that territory.

Singles with Leighton Meester as a featured artist
Title	Year	Peak chart positions									Certifications	Album
Title	Year	US	AUS	AUT	BEL	CAN	FIN	NL	NZ	UK	Certifications	Album
"Good Girls Go Bad" (Cobra Starship featuring Leighton Meester)	2009	7	5	37	4	7	13	19	2	17	RIAA: 2× Platinum; ARIA: Platinum; MC: Platinum; RIANZ: Platinum	Hot Mess
"She Said" (Stephen Jerzak featuring Leighton Meester)	2010	—	—	—	—	—	—	—	—	—		Miles and Miles
"—" denotes releases that did not chart or were not released in that territory.

Leighton Meester promotional singles
Title	Year	Album
"Christmas (Baby Please Come Home)"	2009	A Very Special Christmas 7

Other charted songs by Leighton Meester
Title	Year	Peak chart positions				Certifications	Album
Title	Year	US	US Heat.	US Country Digital	CAN	Certifications	Album
"Give In to Me" (with Garrett Hedlund)	2011	79	5	7	94	RIAA: Gold	Country Strong
"Summer Girl"	2011	104	15	17	—		Country Strong
"Words I Couldn't Say"	2011	120	25	24	—		Country Strong
"—" denotes releases that did not chart or were not released in that territory.

Guest appearances on recordings by Leighton Meester
Title	Year	Other artist(s)	Album
"Inside the Black"	2007	—N/a	Drive-Thru
"Birthday"	2009	Awesome New Republic	Rational Geographic Vol. I
"A Little Bit Stronger"	2010	—N/a	Country Strong
"The Stand In"	2012	Check in the Dark	The Game

Leighton Meester music videos
Year	Title	Director(s)
2009	"Somebody to Love" (featuring Robin Thicke)	Zoe Cassavetes
2014	"Heartstrings"	Stephen Ringer

Music videos with Leighton Meester as a guest artist
Title	Year	Director(s)
"Good Girls Go Bad" (Cobra Starship featuring Leighton Meester)	2009	Kai Regan

Guest appearances in music videos by Leighton Meester
Year	Title	Artist	Director(s)
2012	"Addicted to Love"	Nomads featuring Vanessa Curry	Andrew Sandler and Wilmer Valderrama

== Tours ==
- Leighton Meester + Check in the Dark Summer Tour (2012)
- Heartstrings Tour (2015)

== Awards and nominations ==
Award nominations for Leighton Meester
Year	Award	Category	Work	Result	Ref.
2008	Teen Choice Awards	Choice TV Actress: Drama	Gossip Girl	Nominated	
2008	Teen Choice Awards	Choice TV Breakout Star: Female	Gossip Girl	Nominated	
2009	Teen Choice Awards	Choice TV Actress: Drama	Gossip Girl	Won	
2009	MTV Video Music Awards	Best Pop Video	"Good Girls Go Bad" (with Cobra Starship)	Nominated	
2010	Teen Choice Awards	Choice TV Actress: Drama	Gossip Girl	Won	
2010	Hollywood Film Awards	Spotlight Award	Country Strong	Won	
2011	MTV Movie Awards	Best Villain	The Roommate	Nominated	
2011	Teen Choice Awards	Choice Movie Actress: Drama	Country Strong	Nominated	
2011	Teen Choice Awards	Choice Movie: Villain	The Roommate	Nominated	
2012	Teen Choice Awards	Choice TV Actress: Drama	Gossip Girl	Nominated	
2012	Teen Choice Awards	Choice Summer Movie Star: Female	That's My Boy	Nominated	
2013	Golden Raspberry Awards	Worst Screen Couple	That's My Boy	Nominated	
2013	Golden Raspberry Awards	Worst Screen Ensemble	That's My Boy	Nominated	
2014	Broadway.com Audience Awards	Favorite Featured Actress in a Play	Of Mice and Men	Nominated	
2025	Logie Awards	Best Actress in a Comedy	Good Cop/Bad Cop	Nominated	
