= List of Gwyneth Paltrow performances =

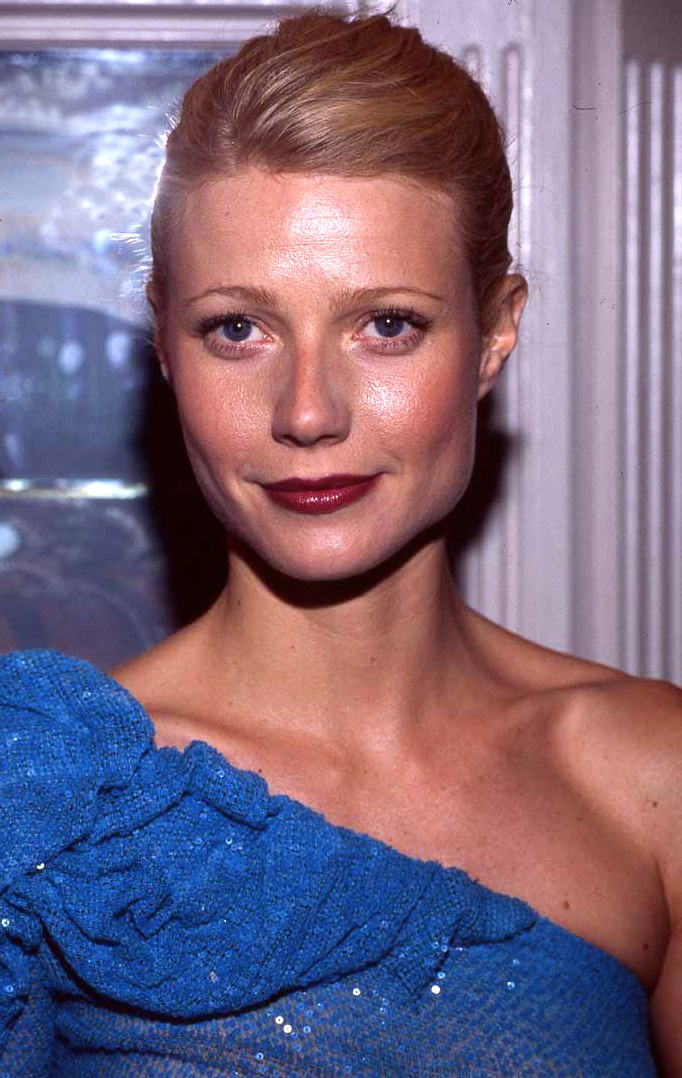
Paltrow at the 2000 Toronto International Film Festival

American actress Gwyneth Paltrow started her career with a small role in her godfather, Steven Spielberg's children's fantasy film Hook (1991) portraying Young Wendy Darling. She gained acclaim in supporting roles in Flesh and Bone (1993), Seven (1995), and Hard Eight (1996). She had her first starring role in the film adaptation of the Jane Austen novel Emma (1996) portraying the title role of Emma Woodhouse. In 1998 she starred in the romance fantasy Sliding Doors, the romantic drama Great Expectations and the romantic period comedy Shakespeare in Love, earning the Academy Award for Best Actress for the latter.

She earned acclaim for her roles in the mystery thriller The Talented Mr. Ripley (1999) and Wes Anderson's comedy-drama The Royal Tenenbaums (2001). She portrayed poet Sylvia Plath in Sylvia (2003). She acted in the dramas Proof (2005), Infamous (2006), Two Lovers (2008), Country Strong (2010), and Contagion (2011) as well as the comedies Shallow Hal (2001), View from the Top (2003), Running with Scissors (2006), and Thanks for Sharing (2012). She joined the Marvel Cinematic Universe portraying Pepper Potts in the seven films starting with Iron Man (2008) to Avengers: Endgame (2019).

On television, she has hosted Saturday Night Live three times from 1999 to 2011. She portrayed Holly Holliday on the Fox musical comedy series Glee, earning a Primetime Emmy Award for Outstanding Guest Actress in a Comedy Series. She acted in the Netflix series The Politician (2019–2020) and starred as herself in the documentary series The Goop Lab (2020). On stage, she acted in numerous productions at the Williamstown Theatre Festival and made her West End theatre debut in the David Auburn play Proof (2002), earning a Laurence Olivier Award for Best Actress nomination.

== Acting credits ==
=== Film ===
Year	Title	Role	Notes
1991	Shout	Rebecca	
1991	Hook	Young Wendy Darling	
1993	Malice	Paula Bell	
1993	Flesh and Bone	Ginnie	
1994	Mrs. Parker and the Vicious Circle	Paula Hunt	
1995	Higher Learning	Student	Uncredited
1995	Jefferson in Paris	Patsy Jefferson	
1995	Seven	Tracy Mills	
1995	Moonlight and Valentino	Lucy Trager	
1996	Hard Eight	Clementine	
1996	The Pallbearer	Julie DeMarco	
1996	Emma	Emma Woodhouse	
1998	Sliding Doors	Helen Quilley	
1998	Great Expectations	Estella Havisham	
1998	Hush	Helen Baring	
1998	A Perfect Murder	Emily Bradford Taylor	
1998	Shakespeare in Love	Viola de Lesseps	
1998	Out of the Past	Sarah Orne Jewett	
1999	The Talented Mr. Ripley	Marge Sherwood	
2000	The Intern	Herself	Uncredited
2000	Duets	Liv Dean	
2000	Bounce	Abby Janello	
2001	The Anniversary Party	Skye Davidson	
2001	The Royal Tenenbaums	Margot Tenenbaum	
2001	Shallow Hal	Rosemary Shanahan	
2002	Searching for Debra Winger	Herself	Documentary
2002	Austin Powers in Goldmember	Dixie Normous	Cameo
2002	Possession	Maud Bailey	
2003	View from the Top	Donna Jensen	
2003	Sylvia	Sylvia Plath	
2004	Sky Captain and the World of Tomorrow	Polly Perkins	
2005	Proof	Catherine Llewellyn	
2006	Infamous	Kitty Dean	
2006	Love and Other Disasters	Hollywood Jacks	Cameo
2006	Running with Scissors	Hope Finch	
2007	The Good Night	Dora Shaller	
2008	Two Lovers	Michelle Rausch	
2008	Iron Man	Pepper Potts	
2010	Iron Man 2	Pepper Potts	
2010	Country Strong	Kelly Canter	
2011	Glee: The 3D Concert Movie	Holly Holliday	Uncredited
2011	Contagion	Beth Emhoff	
2012	The Avengers	Pepper Potts	
2012	Thanks for Sharing	Phoebe	
2013	Iron Man 3	Pepper Potts	
2014	Virunga	Herself	Documentary
2015	Mortdecai	Johanna Mortdecai	
2016	Justin Timberlake + The Tennessee Kids	Herself	Documentary
2017	Man in Red Bandana	Narrator	Documentary; voice role
2017	Spider-Man: Homecoming	Pepper Potts	
2018	Coldplay: A Head Full of Dreams	Herself	Documentary
2018	Avengers: Infinity War	Pepper Potts	
2019	Avengers: Endgame	Pepper Potts / Rescue	
2022	She Said	Herself	Voice role
2025	Marty Supreme	Kay Stone	
2026	Influenced	Cousin Kim	Cameo

=== Television ===
Year	Title	Role	Notes
1992	Cruel Doubt	Angela Pritchard	Miniseries
1993	Deadly Relations	Carol Ann Fagot Applegarth Holland	Television film
1999–2019	Saturday Night Live	Herself / Various	Host; 6 episodes
2000	Clerks: The Animated Series	Herself	Voice role
2008	Spain... on the Road Again	Herself	Documentary; 13 episodes
2010	The Marriage Ref	Herself	Panelist; episode: "Gwyneth Paltrow/Jerry Seinfeld/Greg Giraldo"
2010–2011; 2014	Glee	Holly Holliday	5 episodes
2011	Who Do You Think You Are?	Herself	Episode: "Gwyneth Paltrow"
2012	The New Normal	Abby	Episode: "Pilot"
2014	Web Therapy	Maya Ganesh	2 episodes
2016	Nightcap	Herself	Episode: "A-List Thief"
2017	Planet of the Apps	Herself	Mentor
2019	The Chef Show	Herself	Episode: "Gwyneth Paltrow / Bill Burr"
2019–2020	The Politician	Georgina Hobart	Main role; also executive producer
2020	The Goop Lab	Herself	Also executive producer
2023	American Horror Stories	Daphne	Voice role; episode: "Daphne"

=== Theatre ===
Year	Title	Role	Playwright	Venue	Ref.
1990	The Adventures of Huckleberry Finn	Susan Wilks	Mark Twain	Williamstown Theatre Festival	
1991	Picnic	Millie Owens	William Inge	Williamstown Theatre Festival	
1992	The Sweet By 'N' By	Libby Bradley	Frank Higgins	Williamstown Theatre Festival	
1994	The Seagull	Nina Mikhailovna Zarechnaya	Anton Chekov	Williamstown Theatre Festival	
1999	As You Like It	Rosalind	William Shakespeare	Williamstown Theatre Festival	
2002	Proof	Catherine	David Auburn	Donmar Warehouse, West End	
2018	Head Over Heels	—N/a	Producer only, Broadway		

=== Podcasts ===
Title	Year	Role(s)	Notes	Ref.
Goop	2018 - present	Host	Goop launched a podcast on March 8, 2018, using Cadence13 as its digital platform.	
Armchair Expert	2019	Guest	Episode: "Gwyneth Paltrow"	
Masters of Scale	2019	Guest	Episode: "Entrepreneurship as a Second Act"	
On Purpose with Jay Shetty	2020	Guest	Episode: "Gwyneth Paltrow ON: How To No Longer Keep Emotions Buried Within & Never Looking Outside For Validation"	
Literally! With Rob Lowe	2020	Guest	Episode: "Gwyneth Paltrow: Dangerous and Scintillating"	
On with Mario Interviews	2021	Guest	Episode: "Gwyneth Paltrow"	
Sex With Emily	2021	Guest	Episode: "Sex, Love & Gwyneth Paltrow"	
Smartless	2021	Guest	Episode: "Gwyneth Paltrow"	
Life Will Be the Death of Me with Chelsea Handler	2021	Guest	Episode: "Sex, Love & Goop with Gwyneth Paltrow"	
Watch What Happens Live with Andy Cohen	2021	Guest	Episode: "Gwyneth Paltrow"	
Armchair Expert	2021	Guest	Episode: "Gwyneth Paltrow Returns"	
Unqualified	2021	Guest	Episode: "Gwyneth Paltrow"	
Sunday Sitdown with Willie Geist	2022	Guest	Episode: "Gwyneth Paltrow"	
Nightline	2023	Guest	Episode: "Friday, March 24, 2023"	
Nightline	2023	Guest	Episode: "Friday, March 31, 2023"	
The Kyle and Jackie O Show	2023	Guest	Episode: "Gwyneth Paltrow's Q&A with Jackie!"	
Call Her Daddy	2023	Guest	Episode: "Gwyneth Paltrow: The Ultimate Dating Roster"	
The Skinny Confidential Him and Her Show	2024	Guest	Episode: "Gwyneth Paltrow - On Real Wellness Routines, Career Advice, & How To Feel Your Best"	
Tetragrammaton with Rick Rubin	2025	Guest	Episode: "Gwyneth Paltrow"	
The Run-Through with Vogue	2025	Guest	Episode: "Why Gwyneth Paltrow Is Back On Sourdough and Cheese"	
The World's First Podcast with Erin & Sara Foster	2025	Guest	Episode: The Gwyneth Paltrow Episode	
Awards Chatter	2025	Guest	Episode: "Gwyneth Paltrow - 'Marty Supreme'"	
Good Hang with Amy Poehler	2026	Guest	Episode: "Gwyneth Paltrow Watches TV in Bed"	

== Video game ==
Year	Title	Role	Notes
2002	Quest for the Code	Perfuma	Voice

== Discography ==
=== Singles ===
As lead artist

List of singles as lead artist, with selected chart positions and certifications
Title	Year	Peak chart positions						Certifications	Album
Title	Year	US	US AC	US Country	AUS	NZ	UK	Certifications	Album
"Cruisin'" (with Huey Lewis)	2000	—	1	—	1	1	—	AUS: 2× Platinum	Duets
"Bette Davis Eyes"	2000	—	—	—	3	—	—	AUS: Platinum	Duets
"Country Strong"	2010	81	—	30	—	—	—		Country Strong
"Me and Tennessee" (with Tim McGraw)	2011	—	—	34	—	—	63		Country Strong
"—" denotes releases that did not chart

As featured artist

List of singles as featured artist, with selected chart positions and certifications
Title	Year	Peak chart positions					Album
Title	Year	US	AUS	CAN	IRL	UK	Album
"Forget You" (among Glee cast)	2010	11	24	12	20	31	Glee: The Music, Volume 4
"Nowadays/Hot Honey Rag" (among Glee cast)	2010	—	—	—	—	—	Non-album singles
"Singing in the Rain/Umbrella" (among Glee cast)	2010	18	23	20	10	22	Non-album singles
"Do You Wanna Touch Me (Oh Yeah)"(among Glee cast)	2011	57	—	63	—	95	Glee: The Music, Volume 5
"Kiss" (among Glee cast)	2011	83	98	80	—	—	Glee: The Music, Volume 5
"Landslide" (among Glee cast)	2011	23	38	35	36	52	Glee: The Music, Volume 5
"Turning Tables" (among Glee cast)	2011	66	—	66	—	75	Glee: The Music, Volume 6
"Happy" (among Glee cast)	2014	—	—	—	—	—	Glee: The Music, Celebrating 100 Episodes
"Party All the Time" (among Glee cast)	2014	—	—	—	—	—	Glee: The Music, Celebrating 100 Episodes
"—" denotes releases that did not chart.

=== Other album appearances ===
Song	Year	Album
"Silent Worship" (with Ewan McGregor)	1996	Emma
"Just My Imagination (Running Away with Me)" (with Babyface)	2000	Duets
"It's Only Love" (with Sheryl Crow)	2002	C'mon, C'mon
"What Is This Thing Called Love?" (with Mark Rubin Band)	2006	Infamous
"Shake That Thing"	2010	Country Strong
"Coming Home"	2010	Country Strong
"A Fighter"	2010	Country Strong
"Travis"	2010	Country Strong
"Over the Rainbow" (with Matthew Morrison)	2011	Matthew Morrison
"This Woman's Work"	2011	Every Mother Counts
"Waiting on June" (with Holly Williams)	2013	The Highway
"Everglow" (with Coldplay)	2015	A Head Full of Dreams

== Music videos ==
Video	Year	Director
"I Want to Come Over" (with Melissa Etheridge)	1996	Pam Thomas
"Country Strong"	2010	Kristin Barlowe, Christoper Sims, Shana Feste
"Me and Tennessee" (with Tim McGraw)	2011	Shana Feste

== See also ==
- List of awards and nominations received by Gwyneth Paltrow
