= Words I Couldn't Say =

Song by Rascal Flatts

from the album Me and My Gang
- Released: 2006
- Recorded: 2005
- Genre: Country
- Length: 4:35
- Label: Lyric Street
- Songwriter(s): Steve Robson; Tammi Kidd; Gregory Becker
- Producer(s): Dann Huff; Rascal Flatts

"Words I Couldn't Say" is a song written by Steve Robson, Tammi Kidd, and Gregory Becker and recorded by American country music group Rascal Flatts for their fourth studio album, Me and My Gang (2006). The song found renewed popularity in 2010 after it was featured in the drama film Country Strong as performed by American actress and singer Leighton Meester. Her cover, from the soundtrack album released by RCA Records Nashville, appeared on multiple Billboard sales charts in 2011.

== Composition ==
"Words I Couldn't Say" is a "downbeat breakup lament" that details the emotions the narrator wishes they had expressed to a lover when they had the chance. According to the digital sheet music published by Sony/ATV Music Publishing, the song was originally composed in the key of C major and set in cut time to a "moderate" tempo. The song follows a chord progression of C – G/B – Am – G/B and features a vocal range spanning from G_{4} through E_{6}. Gary LeVox sings lead vocals on the track, while Jay DeMarcus and Joe Don Rooney perform backing harmony vocals. David Campbell arranged and conducted the strings performed on the Rascal Flatts track from Me and My Gang, and Dann Huff was the producer of the recording.

== Critical reception ==
Annie Reuter of Sounds Like Nashville was complimentary of the Rascal Flatts original in 2016, including it on her list of Rascal Flatts album tracks that should have been singles. "Rascal Flatts strike a chord on this soaring heartbreaker," she writes. "While LeVox's voice impresses and [the vocal] harmonies assist, so does the musical accompaniment."

In a review of the Country Strong soundtrack, Stephen Thomas Erlewine of AllMusic wrote that "Gossip Girl Leighton Meester pulls off the sweet "Words I Couldn't Say" with ease." Matthew Wilkening of Taste of Country enjoyed Meester's cover, but wrote that "she sounds a bit young to be so wise and wistful about regrets in her romantic life." Jason Newman of MTV criticized Meester's version of the song as a low point on the soundtrack, writing that the cover "falls, um, flatts [sic]."

== Chart performance ==
Meester's version of "Words I Couldn't Say" entered the Billboard Country Digital Songs sales chart at number 35 for the week of January 22, 2011 and rose to its peak position of 24 the following week. Her cover did not enter the Billboard Hot 100, but did spend one week each at number 20 on the Bubbling Under Hot 100 Singles extension chart and at number 25 on the Heatseeker Songs chart, both for the week of January 29, 2011.

== Charts ==
Leighton Meester version

Chart (2011)	Peak position
US Bubbling Under Hot 100 Singles (Billboard)	20
US Country Digital Songs (Billboard)	24
US Heatseeker Songs (Billboard)	25
