= List of awards and nominations received by Gwyneth Paltrow =

Gwyneth Paltrow awards and nominations
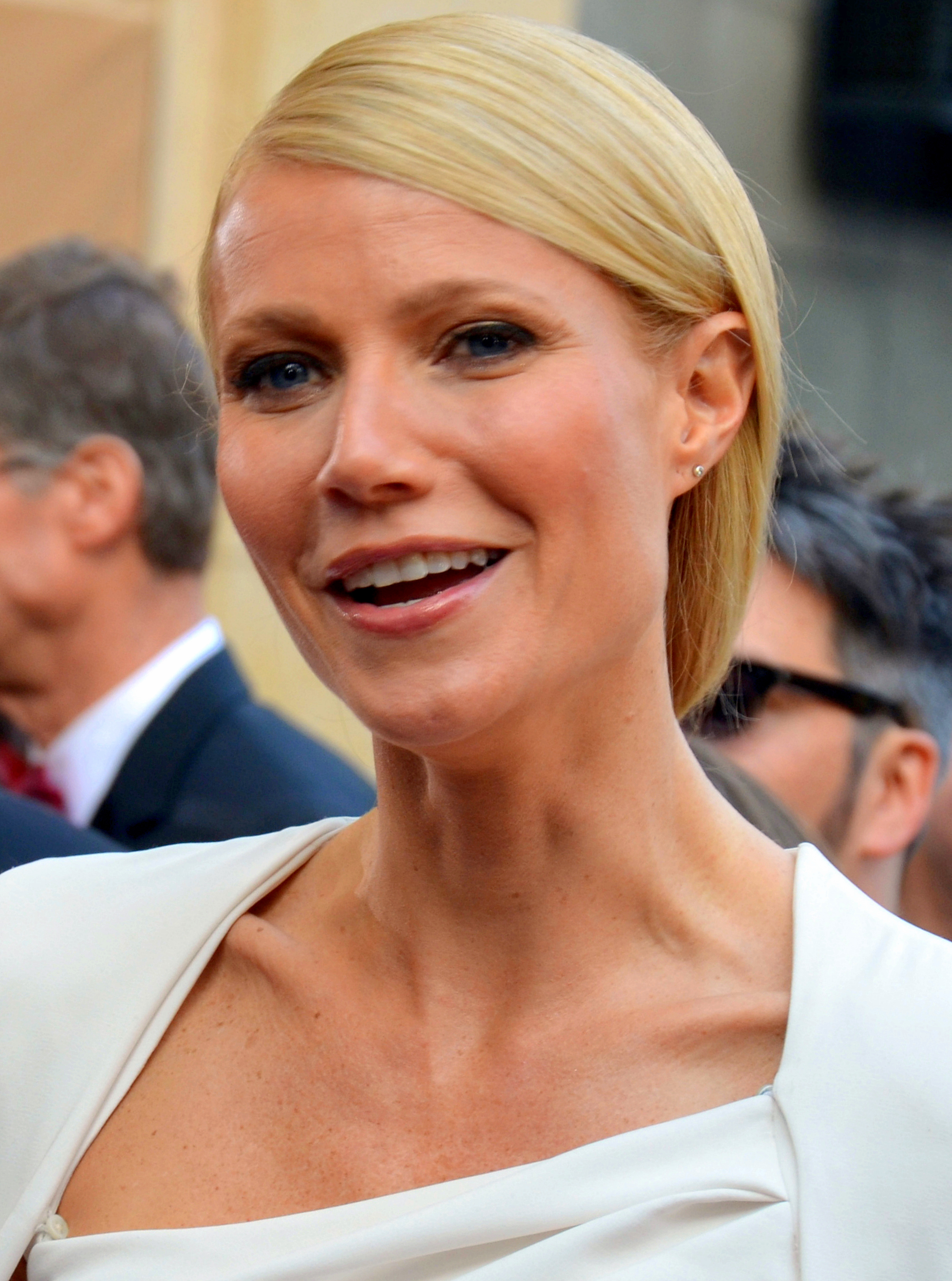
- Paltrow at the 2012 Academy Awards
Awards and nominations
Award	Wins	Nominations
Academy Awards	1	1
Actor Awards	2	3
British Academy Film Awards	0	1
Critics' Choice Awards	0	2
Golden Globes	1	2
Grammy Awards	0	1
Laurence Olivier Awards	0	1
Primetime Emmy Awards	1	2

Totals (Note: Certain award groups do not simply award one winner. They acknowledge several different recipients, have runners-up, and have third place. Since this is a specific recognition and is different from losing an award, runner-up mentions are considered wins in this award tally. For simplification and to avoid errors, each award in this list has been presumed to have had a prior nomination.)
- Wins: 23
- Nominations: 72

Gwyneth Paltrow is an American actress and singer who has received various awards and nominations, including an Academy Award, a Golden Globe Award, a Primetime Emmy Award, and two SAG-AFTRA's Actor Awards.

Paltrow rose to international fame with her portrayal of Viola de Lesseps in the romantic period comedy-drama film Shakespeare in Love (1998), which earned her many accolades, including the Academy Award for Best Actress, as well as the Actor Award for Outstanding Actress in a Leading Role, the Golden Globe Award for Best Actress in a Comedy, and a nomination for the BAFTA Award for Best Actress in a Leading Role. For her performance in the film Proof (2005), she was nominated for the Golden Globe Award for Best Actress in a Drama, and for the romantic drama film Two Lovers (2008), she was nominated for the Independent Spirit Award for Best Female Lead. From 2008 to 2019, Paltrow portrayed Pepper Potts in the Marvel Cinematic Universe, which earned her nominations for a Critics' Choice Award, two People's Choice Awards, and a Saturn Award.

In 2011, she starred as Holly Holliday on the musical comedy-drama television series Glee, which won her the Primetime Emmy Award for Outstanding Guest Actress in a Comedy Series. She was also nominated for a Grammy Award for Best Spoken Word Album for Children for the children's audiobook Brown Bear and Friends (2008). On stage, she made her West End debut in the David Auburn's play Proof (2003), earning a Laurence Olivier Award for Best Actress nomination.

== Major associations ==
=== Academy Awards ===
Year	Category	Nominated work	Result	Ref.
1999	Best Actress	Shakespeare in Love	Won	

=== Actor Awards ===
Year	Category	Nominated work	Result	Ref.
1999	Outstanding Cast in a Motion Picture (Note: Shared with the cast of Shakespeare in Love)	Shakespeare in Love	Won	
1999	Outstanding Actress in a Leading Role	Shakespeare in Love	Won	
2026	Outstanding Cast in a Motion Picture (Note: Shared with the cast of Marty Supreme)	Marty Supreme	Nominated	

=== BAFTA Awards ===
British Academy Film Awards
Year	Category	Nominated work	Result	Ref.
1999	Best Actress in a Leading Role	Shakespeare in Love	Nominated	

=== Emmy Awards ===
Primetime Emmy Awards
Year	Category	Nominated work	Result	Ref.
2011	Outstanding Guest Actress in a Comedy Series	Glee (episode: "The Substitute")	Won	
2013	Outstanding Informational Series or Special (Note: Shared with producers Joel Gallen, Nikki Varhely Gillingham, Rick Austin, and Emily Wolfe)	Stand Up to Cancer	Nominated	

=== Golden Globes ===
Year	Category	Nominated work	Result	Ref.
1999	Best Actress in a Motion Picture – Musical or Comedy	Shakespeare in Love	Won	
2006	Best Actress in a Motion Picture – Drama	Proof	Nominated	

=== Grammy Awards ===
Year	Category	Nominated work	Result	Ref.
2009	Best Spoken Word Album for Children	Brown Bear and Friends	Nominated	

=== Laurence Olivier Awards ===
Year	Category	Nominated work	Result	Ref.
2003	Best Actress	Proof	Nominated	

== Miscellaneous accolades ==
Award	Year	Category	Work / Nominee	Result	Ref.
AARP Movies for Grownups Awards	2026	Best Supporting Actress	Marty Supreme	Nominated	
Astra Film Awards	2026	Best Supporting Actress – Comedy or Musical	Marty Supreme	Nominated	
Austin Film Critics Association Awards	2025	Best Ensemble	Marty Supreme	Nominated	
Bambi Awards	2011	Film International	Gwyneth Paltrow	Won	
Blockbuster Entertainment Awards	1997	Favorite Actress – Romance	Emma	Nominated	
Blockbuster Entertainment Awards	1999	Favorite Actress – Comedy/Romance	Shakespeare in Love	Nominated	
Blockbuster Entertainment Awards	1999	Favorite Actress – Suspense	A Perfect Murder	Won	
Blockbuster Entertainment Awards	2000	Favorite Actress – Suspense	The Talented Mr. Ripley	Nominated	
Blockbuster Entertainment Awards	2001	Favorite Actress – Drama/Romance	Bounce	Won	
Boston Society of Film Critics Awards	2025	Best Ensemble	Marty Supreme	Won	
Chicago Film Critics Association Awards	1999	Best Actress	Shakespeare in Love	Nominated	
Critics' Choice Awards	2001	Best Acting Ensemble (Note: Shared with the cast of The Royal Tenenbaums)	The Royal Tenenbaums	Nominated	
Critics' Choice Awards	2014	Best Actress in an Action Movie	Iron Man 3	Nominated	
Critics' Choice Real TV Awards	2020	Female Star of the Year	The Goop Lab	Nominated	
Drama League Awards	2019	Outstanding Production of a Broadway or Off-Broadway Musical (Note: Shared with the producers of Head over Heels)	Head over Heels	Nominated	
Empire Awards	2000	Best Actress	Shakespeare in Love	Won	
Film Independent Spirit Awards	2010	Best Female Lead	Two Lovers	Nominated	
Florida Film Critics Circle Awards	1999	Best Actress	Shakespeare in Love and Sliding Doors	Won	
Georgia Film Critics Association Awards	2025	Best Ensemble	Marty Supreme	Nominated	
Golden Camera Awards	2014	Best International Actress	Gwyneth Paltrow	Won	
Golden Raspberry Awards	2016	Worst Actress	Mortdecai	Nominated	
Houston Film Critics Society Awards	2026	Best Ensemble	Marty Supreme	Nominated	
International Cinephile Society Awards	2026	Best Ensemble	Marty Supreme	Nominated	
Jupiter Awards	2000	Best International Actress	Shakespeare in Love	Won	
Kansas City Film Critics Circle Awards	1998	Best Actress	Shakespeare in Love	Won	
Las Vegas Film Critics Society Awards	1998	Best Actress	Shakespeare in Love	Won	
London Film Critics' Circle Awards	1999	Actress of the Year	Great Expectations, A Perfect Murder and Sliding Doors	Nominated	
MTV Movie & TV Awards	1999	Best Female Performance	Shakespeare in Love	Nominated	
MTV Movie & TV Awards	1999	Best Kiss (Note: Shared with Joseph Fiennes)	Shakespeare in Love	Won	
MTV Movie & TV Awards	2001	Best Kiss (Note: Shared with Ben Affleck)	Bounce	Nominated	
MTV Movie & TV Awards	2005	Best Kiss (Note: Shared with Jude Law)	Sky Captain and the World of Tomorrow	Nominated	
National Society of Film Critics Awards	1994	Best Supporting Actress	Flesh and Bone	Nominated	
Online Film Critics Society Awards	1999	Best Actress	Shakespeare in Love	Nominated	
People's Choice Awards	2012	Favorite TV Guest Star	Glee	Nominated	
People's Choice Awards	2014	Favorite Movie Actress	Iron Man 3	Nominated	
People's Choice Awards	2014	Favorite Movie Duo (Note: Shared with Robert Downey Jr.)	Iron Man 3	Nominated	
Phoenix Film Critics Society Awards	2002	Best Acting Ensemble	The Royal Tenenbaums	Nominated	
Phoenix Film Critics Society Awards	2011	Best Acting Ensemble (Note: Shared with the cast of Contagion)	Contagion	Nominated	
Russian Guild of Film Critics Awards	1998	Best Foreign Actress	Sliding Doors	Won	
Russian Guild of Film Critics Awards	1999	Best Foreign Actress	Shakespeare in Love	Nominated	
San Diego Film Critics Society Awards	1998	Special Award	Shakespeare in Love and Sliding Doors	Won	
Satellite Awards	1997	Best Actress in a Motion Picture – Comedy or Musical	Emma	Won	
Satellite Awards	1999	Best Actress in a Motion Picture – Comedy or Musical	Shakespeare in Love	Nominated	
Satellite Awards	2002	Best Supporting Actress in a Motion Picture – Comedy or Musical	The Royal Tenenbaums	Nominated	
Satellite Awards	2010	Best Original Song (Note: Shared with Jennifer Hanson, Tony Martin, and Mark Nesler)	"Country Strong"	Nominated	
Saturn Awards	1996	Best Supporting Actress	Se7en	Nominated	
Saturn Awards	2009	Best Actress	Iron Man	Nominated	
Scream Awards	2008	Best Science Fiction Actress	Iron Man	Nominated	
Scream Awards	2010	Best Science Fiction Actress	Iron Man 2	Nominated	
ShoWest Awards	2004	Distinguished Decade of Achievement in Film	Gwyneth Paltrow	Won	
Southeastern Film Critics Association Awards	1998	Best Actress	Shakespeare in Love and Sliding Doors	Runner-up	
Teen Choice Awards	1999	Choice Movie Actress	Gwyneth Paltrow	Nominated	
Teen Choice Awards	1999	Sexiest Love Scene	Shakespeare in Love	Nominated	
Teen Choice Awards	2002	Choice Movie Actress: Comedy	Shallow Hal	Nominated	
Teen Choice Awards	2008	Choice Movie Actress: Action	Iron Man	Nominated	
Teen Choice Awards	2010	Choice Movie Actress: Sci-Fi/Fantasy	Iron Man 2	Nominated	
Teen Choice Awards	2013	Choice Movie Actress: Sci-Fi/Fantasy	Iron Man 3	Nominated	
Teen Choice Awards	2013	Choice Movie Actress: Action	Iron Man 3	Nominated	
Toronto Film Critics Association Awards	2001	Best Supporting Actress	The Royal Tenenbaums	Runner-up	
Women in Film Crystal + Lucy Awards	2004	Crystal Award	Gwyneth Paltrow	Won	
Women's Image Network Awards	2005	Best Actress in Film	Proof	Nominated	

== See also ==
- List of Gwyneth Paltrow performances
