= Give In to Me (Faith Hill song) =

Song by Faith Hill

from the album Country Strong
- Released: October 26, 2010
- Studio: Tragedy (Nashville, TN)
- Genre: Country pop
- Length: 4:11
- Label: RCA Nashville
- Songwriter(s): Billy Falcon; Rose Falcon; Elisha Hoffman
- Producer(s): Jay Joyce

"Give In to Me" is a song written by Billy Falcon, Rose Falcon, and Elisha Hoffman and recorded by American country pop singer Faith Hill for Country Strong, the soundtrack to the 2010 film of the same name. The song was produced by Jay Joyce. It is the only track on the album to not be included in the film itself. Despite not being released as a single, Hill's recording reached number 56 on the Billboard Hot Country Songs chart in 2011 due to unsolicited airplay.

An alternate version of the song was recorded by two of the film's stars, Garrett Hedlund and Leighton Meester, for a companion album titled Country Strong (More Music from the Motion Picture). Their rendition charted at 79 in the United States and at 94 in Canada from digital sales, and was certified Gold by the Recording Industry Association of America (RIAA) in February 2014.

== Composition ==
"Give In to Me" is a country pop ballad written by Billy Falcon, Rose Falcon, and Elisha Hoffman. Produced by Jay Joyce, the original Faith Hill recording lasts for four minutes and eleven seconds. According to the digital sheet music published by Spirit One Music, "Give In to Me" was composed in the key of C Major with a one octave vocal range that spans from G_{3} to G_{4}. The song was set in common time to a tempo of 80 BPM. Matthew Wilkening of Taste of Country described the song's instrumentation as "delicate guitar lines over a warm keyboard backdrop," and Hill's vocal performance on the song as "restrained" and "elegant." "Give In to Me" features passionate lyrics that describe a deep form of love and intimacy.

== Critical reception ==
In a review of the film's soundtrack, The Mercury News praised "Give In to Me" for its storytelling, writing, "Faith Hill's slow boil on "Give In to Me" shows the pretenders what makes a great country music performance." Meg Grant of AARP The Magazine likewise complimented the song's lyrical content, calling it "the best song to come out of Country Strong," in a review of the film itself. "Country's strength is, in fact, its honest and tender portrayal of human weakness," writes Grant, "something "Give In To Me" [sic] reveals, and something these filmmakers overlooked." Matthew Wilkening of Taste of Country contrasted the song favorably to Hill's bombastic back catalogue, writing that "unlike those overdone Sunday Night Football theme songs, 'Give In to Me' is a tasteful, hushed mid-tempo song."

== Commercial performance ==
Faith Hill's recording of "Give In to Me" debuted at number 60 on the Billboard Hot Country Songs chart dated January 15, 2011. It reached a peak position of 56 when it re-entered on the chart dated February 12, 2011 and spent one additional week on the chart.

Garrett Hedlund and Leighton Meester's recording of "Give In to Me" entered the Billboard Bubbling Under Hot 100 Singles chart at number 4 on the chart dated January 22, 2011. It entered the Billboard Hot 100 the following week at 79, fuelled by a debut of 56 on the Digital Songs component sales chart. For the week of January 22, 2011, the song also entered the Heatseeker Songs chart at number 15. It rose to its peak position of 5 on the following chart dated January 29, 2011. Hedlund and Meester's version did not chart on Hot Country Songs, as the chart only tracked airplay at the time, but it did peak at number 7 on the Country Digital Songs sales chart in its second week, on the chart dated January 29, 2011. Their rendition was certified Gold by RIAA on February 7, 2014, indicating digital sales of over 500,000 units.

== Track listings ==
Country Strong
No.	Title	Performer(s)	Length
9.	"Give In to Me"	Faith Hill	4:11

Country Strong (More Music from the Motion Picture)
No.	Title	Performer(s)	Length
12.	"Give In to Me"	Garrett Hedlund and Leighton Meester	3:29

== Charts ==
Faith Hill version

Chart (2011)	Peak position
US Hot Country Songs (Billboard)	56

Garrett Hedlund and Leighton Meester version

Chart (2011)	Peak position
Canada (Canadian Hot 100)	94
US Billboard Hot 100	76
US Country Digital Songs (Billboard)	7
US Heatseeker Songs (Billboard)	5

== Certifications and sales ==
Garrett Hedlund and Leighton Meester version

Region	Certification	Certified units/sales
United States (RIAA)	Gold	500,000^{‡}
^{‡} Sales+streaming figures based on certification alone.
