= Garrett Hedlund =

American actor (born 1984)

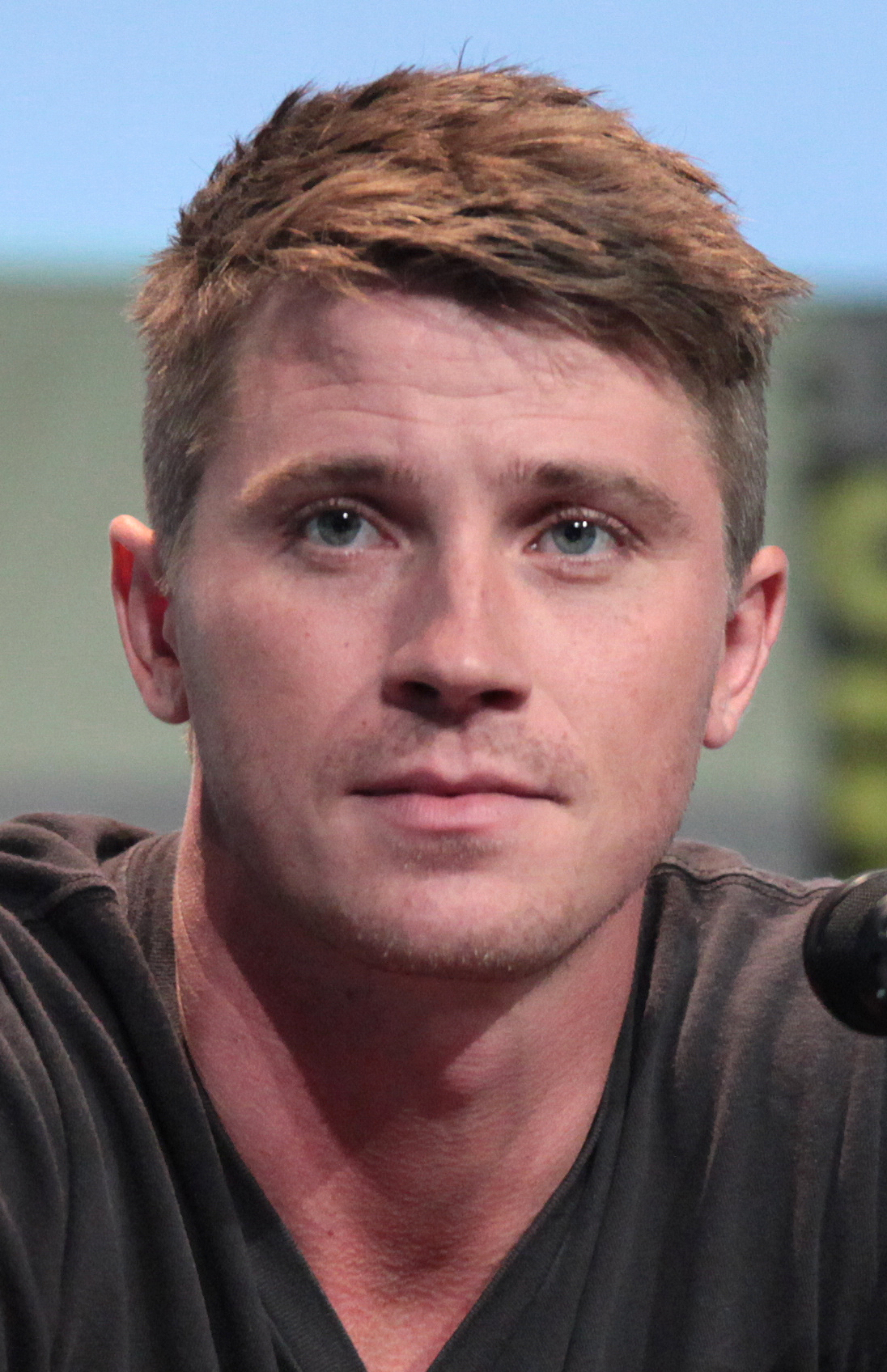
- Hedlund in 2015
- Born: Garrett John Hedlund; September 3, 1984 (age 42); Roseau, Minnesota, U.S.
- Occupations: Actor; singer
- Years active: 2003–present
- Partner: Emma Roberts (2019–2022)
- Children: 1

Garrett John Hedlund (born September 3, 1984) is an American actor. His films include Troy (2004), Friday Night Lights (2004), Four Brothers (2005), Eragon (2006), Georgia Rule (2007), Death Sentence (2007), Tron: Legacy (2010), Country Strong (2010), On the Road (2012), Inside Llewyn Davis (2013), Unbroken (2014), Pan (2015), Mudbound (2017), Triple Frontier (2019), and The Marsh King's Daughter (2023).

== Early life ==
Garrett John Hedlund was born on September 3, 1984, in Roseau, Minnesota, to Kristine Anne (née Yanish) and Robert Martin Hedlund. His father is of Swedish descent and his mother is of Norwegian and German descent. He is the youngest of three children, with a brother, Nathaniel, and a sister, Amanda.

Hedlund was raised on a remote beef cattle farm near the small town of Wannaska, Minnesota, in the Scandinavian diaspora.

In the 9th grade, he moved to live with his mother in Arizona. From an early age, he has had a great fondness for reading. During his school years he participated in ice hockey, track and field, wrestling, and American football. In Arizona he saved his tips from working as a waiter to pay for lessons with acting coach Jean Fowler, with whom he worked on speeches and script material.

Six months after graduating from Horizon High School, he moved to Los Angeles.

== Career ==
=== 2003–2009: Early work and breakthrough ===
In 2003, Hedlund moved to Los Angeles to pursue his acting career. As a teenager, Hedlund modeled for L.L. Bean and Teen magazine.

At the age of nineteen, Hedlund made his debut in his first feature film playing Patroclus, younger cousin of Achilles played by Brad Pitt in the mythological epic adventure war drama Troy, directed by Wolfgang Petersen. The film was released on May 14, 2004.

That same year, he also co-starred with Billy Bob Thornton, Amber Heard and Tim McGraw as Don Billingsley in the 2004 sports drama Friday Night Lights, where McGraw played his abusive father. In 2005, he co-starred with Mark Wahlberg, Tyrese Gibson and André Benjamin in the crime drama Four Brothers as Jack Mercer.

He co-starred with Ed Speleers, Jeremy Irons, Djimon Hounsou and John Malkovich in the fantasy / adventure film Eragon as Murtagh Morzansson. This 20th Century Fox film is an international co-production between United States, United Kingdom and Hungary. In October 2006, it was announced that the actors from the Eragon film would lend their voices to the game adaptation. Hedlund lends his image and voice to his character Murtagh in the video game Eragon.

In 2007, he co-starred with Lindsay Lohan, Jane Fonda and Cary Elwes in the comedy Georgia Rule, directed by Garry Marshall. That same year, he co-starred with Kevin Bacon in the crime thriller Death Sentence, directed by James Wan. In this film Hedlund plays the main villain Billy Darley.

=== 2010–2012: Tron: Legacy and worldwide recognition ===
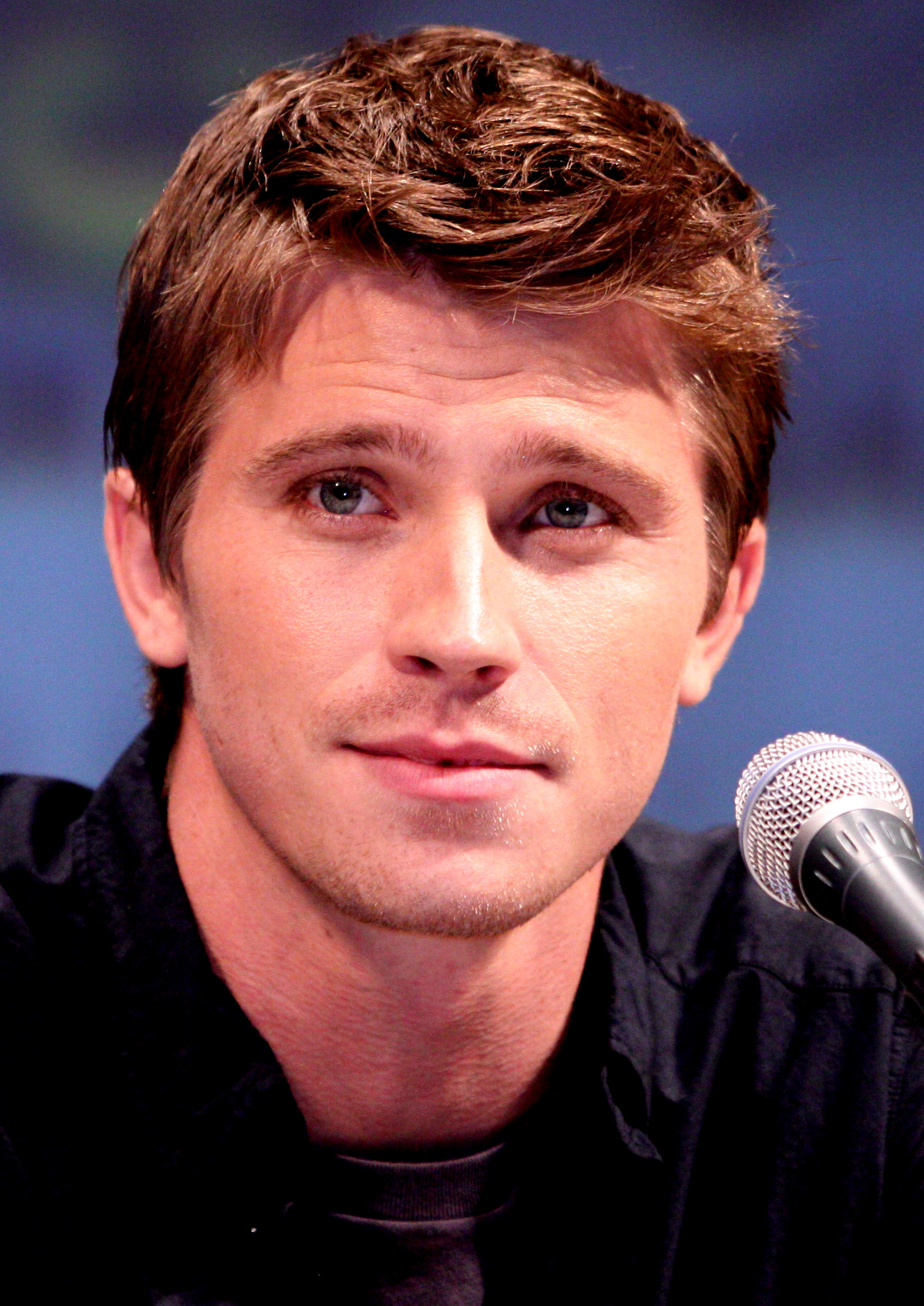
Hedlund at the 2010 San Diego Comic-Con International

In 2010, Hedlund played Sam Flynn, the main protagonist in the science fiction / action film Tron: Legacy, acting alongside Jeff Bridges and Olivia Wilde. Hedlund won a "Darwinian casting process" which tested hundreds of actors, being chosen for having the "unique combination of intelligence, wit, humor, look and physicality" that the producers were looking for in Flynn's son. Hedlund trained hard to do his own stunts, which included jumping over cars and copious wire and harness work. The film was released on December 17, 2010, and directed by Joseph Kosinski. It is a sequel to the 1982 film Tron, whose director Steven Lisberger returned to produce. Like its predecessor, Tron: Legacy has also been described as a cult film. Hedlund was also considered by Disney to play Captain America / Steve Rogers in the Marvel Cinematic Universe, but had to abandon the project because his film schedule got in the way of Tron: Legacy.

Hedlund co-starred with Gwyneth Paltrow, Leighton Meester and his Friday Night Lights co-star, country musician Tim McGraw in the musical drama Country Strong, which was released on December 22, 2010. He recorded a number of songs for the film including "Chances Are" which appeared on Country Strong: Original Motion Picture Soundtrack. His performance was well received by critics. Noting voice similarities between Hedlund and Charlie Robison, Roughstock said "the best song on this album belongs to him" and Country Weekly wrote that of all the songs performed by actors in this film, his was "the most convincing". Six other songs, including a duet with Meester, were featured on a second soundtrack titled Country Strong: More Music from the Motion Picture.

On June 7, 2011, Hedlund was named "Man of the Year" at the Glamour Awards.

He also co-starred with Kristen Stewart, Sam Riley, Kirsten Dunst and Viggo Mortensen as Dean Moriarty in the 2012 adventure drama On the Road, produced by Francis Ford Coppola. The film was directed by Walter Salles and based on Jack Kerouac's novel of same name. Hedlund's performance in this film was praised by critics. In The Hollywood Reporter, veteran reviewer Todd McCarthy writing "Although the story is Sal / Kerouac's, the star part is Dean, and Hedlund has the allure for it; among the men here, he's the one you always watch, and the actor effectively catches the character's impulsive, thrill-seeking, risk-taking, responsibility-avoiding personality." Entertainment Weekly magazine's Owen Gleiberman wrote, "The best thing in the movie is Garrett Hedlund's performance as Dean Moriarty, whose hunger for life – avid, erotic, insatiable, destructive – kindles a fire that will light the way to a new era. Hedlund is as hunky as the young Brad Pitt, and like Pitt, he's a wily, change-up actor".

That same year, he was an advertising and catwalk model for the Italian fashion firm Prada.

Hedlund was cast as Kaneda Shotaro in the live-action version of Akira but production of the film was cancelled. Hedlund reportedly turned down the roles of Christian Grey in the film adaptation of E. L. James' best-selling novel Fifty Shades of Grey and Finnick Odair in the sequel to the dystopian science fiction / adventure film The Hunger Games titled The Hunger Games: Catching Fire.

=== 2013–2022: Established actor ===
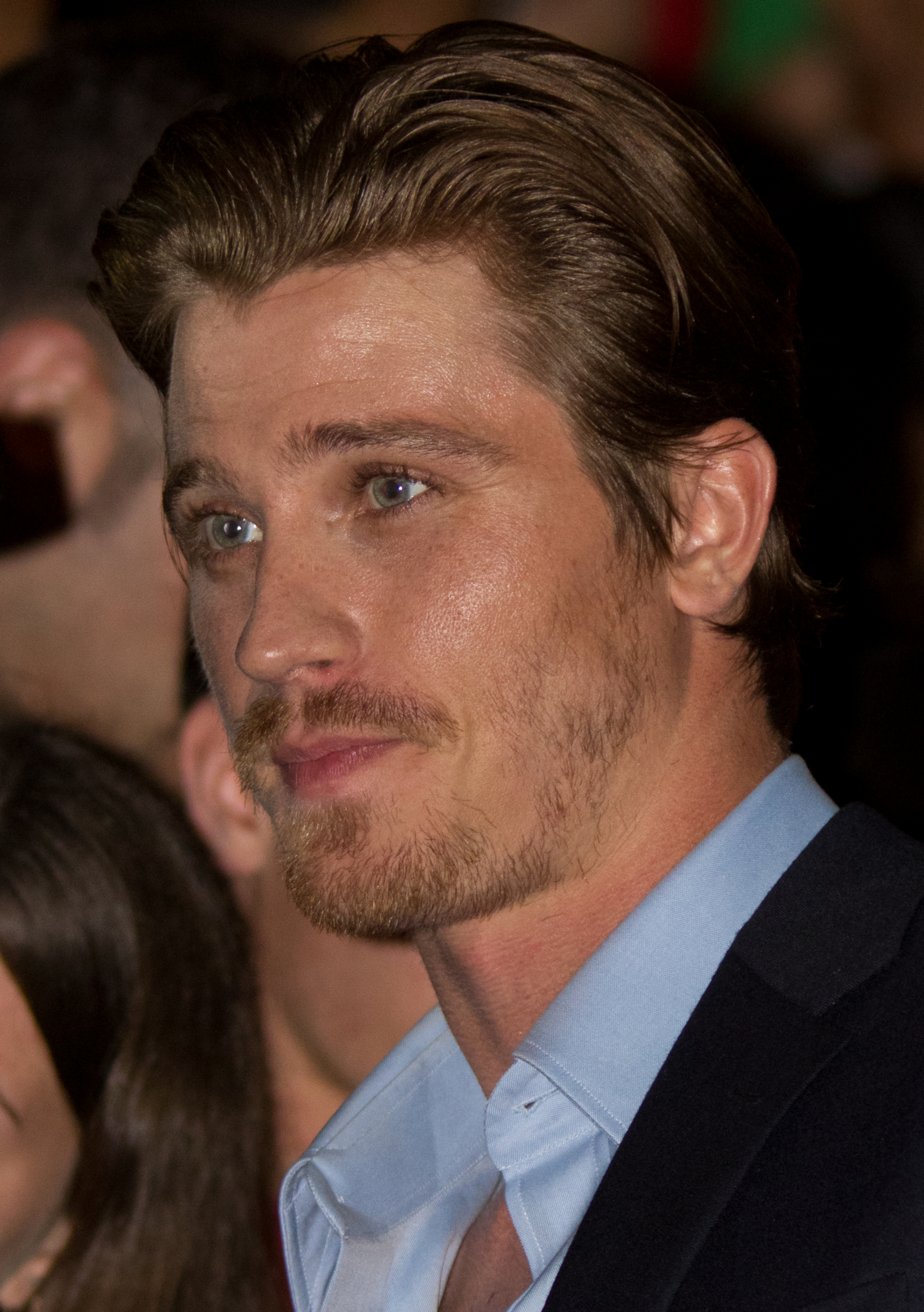
Hedlund at the 2012 Toronto International Film Festival

In 2013, Hedlund co-starred with Oscar Isaac, Justin Timberlake and Adam Driver in the French-American black comedy-drama film Inside Llewyn Davis, directed by Joel and Ethan Coen. Hedlund pays homage to a fallen cowboy whose name is Lane Frost in the music video of the song Beautiful War by American rock band Kings of Leon. Also in 2013, he was the image of Yves Saint Laurent Beauté's French men's fragrance "La Nuit de l'Homme".

He starred in the drama film Lullaby in 2014, directed by Andrew Levitas. In this film Hedlund sings the main musical theme. That same year, he co-starred with Jack O'Connell and Domhnall Gleeson in the historical drama Unbroken, directed by Angelina Jolie.

Hedlund played James Hook in the film Pan in 2015, co-starring alongside Hugh Jackman, Rooney Mara and Levi Miller, directed by Joe Wright. In September of that same year, Hedlund wrote the book The Art of Pan with Joe Wright and Christopher Grove.

He co-starred with Joe Alwyn and Vin Diesel in the 2016 film war drama film Billy Lynn's Long Halftime Walk, directed by Ang Lee.

In 2017, he co-starred with Carey Mulligan in the film Mudbound, directed by Dee Rees. Also that same year, he co-starred with Sharon Stone as an aspiring artist in Steven Soderbergh's HBO murder mystery drama series Mosaic. It was released in two forms: as an iOS/Android mobile app and as a television drama. In 2018, Hedlund produced and starred alongside Juno Temple in the short film Tocsin filmed in Cayman Islands and directed by Frank E. Flowers. That same year, he was the protagonist of the movie Burden playing Mike Burden, in this dramatic film inspired by true events Hedlund acted alongside Forest Whitaker and Usher.

He co-starred with Ben Affleck, Oscar Isaac, Charlie Hunnam, and Pedro Pascal in the action / adventure film, released by Netflix in 2019 and directed by J. C. Chandor, Triple Frontier recorded between Soacha and Bogotá, where he plays a former Special Forces Soldier in a particular mercenary operation in South America. That same year, he co-stars with Kelly Macdonald in the romantic drama film Dirt Music, directed by Gregor Jordan. This film is a United Kingdom / Australian co-production and is based on the novel of the same name by Tim Winton; Hedlund recorded a number of songs for the film. In August 2020, a "Dirt Music" soundtrack album (featuring music from the film) was released as a digital download.

Hedlund portrayed controversial U.S. government official Harry J. Anslinger in the biographical film The United States vs. Billie Holiday in 2021, directed by Lee Daniels; Anslinger was actually in his mid 50s to 60s during the setting of the film. In September 2021, he stars in the first Stephen King podcast titled Strawberry Spring. Hedlund's first single not associated with an acting role, "The Road", was digitally released on January 21, 2022. That same year, he began co-starring with Sylvester Stallone in the Paramount+ series Tulsa King, playing bartender and ex-bull rider Mitch Keller.

=== 2023–present ===
In 2023, he starred as the protagonist of the film The Tutor, playing Ethan Campbell (a high society professional college tutor). In this psychological thriller Hedlund acted alongside Noah Schnapp and Victoria Justice. He co-starred with Mel Gibson in the action thriller film Desperation Road written by Michael Farris Smith. This same year, he also co-starred with Daisy Ridley and Ben Mendelsohn in the film The Marsh King's Daughter, directed by Neil Burger and based on the international bestseller by Karen Dionne.

== Personal life ==
Hedlund is a skilled guitarist and violinist. During the filming of Eragon in Slovakia, his co-star Jeremy Irons was his personal instructor in the development of alternative violin techniques.

=== Relationships ===
From 2012 to 2016, Hedlund was in a relationship with his On the Road co-star Kirsten Dunst. Hedlund and Dunst were briefly engaged before eventually breaking up.

In March 2019, Hedlund began a relationship with actress Emma Roberts. In August 2020, it was announced that the couple was expecting their first child, a son. Roberts gave birth to their son, Rhodes Robert Hedlund, on December 27, 2020, in Los Angeles. Country singer and actor Tim McGraw is godfather to Hedlund's son. In January 2022, it was announced that Hedlund and Roberts had split.

== Filmography ==
=== Film ===
Year	Title	Role	Notes	Ref.
2004	Troy	Patroclus		
2004	Friday Night Lights	Don "Donny" Billingsley		
2005	Four Brothers	Jack "Jackie" Mercer		
2006	Eragon	Murtagh Morzansson		
2007	Georgia Rule	Harlan Wilson		
2007	Death Sentence	Billy Darley		
2010	Tron: Legacy	Samuel "Sam" Flynn		
2010	Country Strong	Beau Hutton	Also musician	
2011	Tron: The Next Day	Samuel "Sam" Flynn	Short film	
2012	On the Road	Dean Moriarty / Neal Cassady		
2013	Inside Llewyn Davis	Johnny Five		
2014	Lullaby	Jonathan Lowenstein	Also musician	
2014	Unbroken	Lt. Cmdr. John Fitzgerald		
2015	Mojave	Thomas "Tom"	Also musician	
2015	Pan	James Hook		
2016	Billy Lynn's Long Halftime Walk	Staff Sergeant David Dime		
2017	Mudbound	Jamie McAllan		
2018	Tocsin	G (musician protagonist)	Short film; Also producer	
2018	Burden	Mike Burden		
2018	Lucero: Long Way Back Home	Cory	Short film	
2019	Triple Frontier	Benjamin "Ben / Benny" Miller		
2019	Dreamland	Perry Montroy	Special participation	
2019	Dirt Music	Luther "Lu" Fox	Also musician	
2021	The United States vs. Billie Holiday	Harry J. Anslinger		
2023	The Tutor	Ethan Campbell		
2023	The Absence of Eden	Agent Shipp		
2023	Desperation Road	Russell Gaines	Also musician	
2023	The Marsh King's Daughter	Stephen Pelletier		
2024	Barron's Cove	Caleb Faulkner		
2026	Heartland	Roy Combs		
TBA	Outside the Wire †	TBA	Post-production	

Key
†	Denotes films that have not yet been released

=== Television ===
Year	Title	Role	Notes	Ref.
2011	When I Was 17	Himself	Special participation; 1 episode	
2017–2018	Mosaic	Joel Hurley	Main role; 8 episodes	
2021	Modern Love	Spence	Main role. Episode: "In the Waiting Room of Estranged Spouses"	
2021	Reservation Dogs	David	Special participation; 1 episode	
2022–present	Tulsa King	Mitch Keller	Main role; 19 episodes; Also musician	
2023	The Family Stallone	Himself	Special participation; 1 episode; Reality streaming television	
2023	Lawmen: Bass Reeves	Garrett Montgomery	Recurring guest; 1 episode; Television miniseries	
TBA	The Murder of JonBenét Ramsey	Steve Thomas	Main role; 7 episodes; Limited series	
TBA	Criminal	TBA	Recurring guest; 1 episode	

=== Podcasts ===
Year	Title	Role	Notes	Ref.
2021	Strawberry Spring	Henry Denton	Main role; 8 episodes	
2022	Make It Up as We Go	Lawford Keane	Episode: "Cantina Lullaby"; Also musician	
2023	Supreme: The Battle for Roe	Ron Weddington	Recurring guest; 4 episodes	

=== Video games ===
Year	Title	Voice role	Notes	Ref.
2006	Eragon	Murtagh Morzansson		
2017–2018	Mosaic	Joel Hurley		

=== Music videos ===
Year	Song	Artist(s)	Role	Notes	Ref.
2012	"Truck Yeah"	Tim McGraw	Trucker (protagonist)	Actor / Guitarist	
2013	"Beautiful War"	Kings of Leon	Lane Frost	Actor / Guitarist	
2022	"Best Ones"	Garrett Hedlund	Himself	Singer	
2022	"Tulsa Night"	Garrett Hedlund (duet with Caitlin Rose)	Himself	Singer-Songwriter / Guitarist	
2023	"Day One"	Garrett Hedlund	Himself	Singer-Songwriter / Guitarist	
2023	"Yep Roc Heresy"	Coati Mundi	Dean Moriarty / Neal Cassady	Actor	
2023	"Desperation Road"	Garrett Hedlund	Russell Gaines	Singer-Songwriter / Actor	
2025	"River, Again"	Garrett Hedlund	Himself	Singer-Songwriter / Guitarist	
2026	"Karaoke Bar"	Garrett Hedlund	Himself	Actor	

== Discography ==
=== Soundtrack Country Strong (Sony Music Entertainment) ===
Country Strong: Songs from the Original Motion Picture
Year	Song	Album	Time	Ref.
2010	"Chances Are"	Country Strong: Original Motion Picture Soundtrack	3:25	
2010	"Silver Wings"	Country Strong: More Music from the Motion Picture	3:21	
2010	"Hard Out Here"	Country Strong: More Music from the Motion Picture	3:09	
2010	"Turn Loose The Horses"	Country Strong: More Music from the Motion Picture	3:05	
2010	"Give In to Me" (duet with Leighton Meester)	Country Strong: More Music from the Motion Picture	3:29	
2010	"Hide Me Babe"	Country Strong: More Music from the Motion Picture	3:08	
2010	"Timing Is Everything"	Country Strong: More Music from the Motion Picture	3:24	

=== Soundtrack Dirt Music (Universal Music Group) ===
Dirt Music: Songs from the Original Motion Picture
Year	Song	Album	Time	Ref.
2020	"Dumb Things"	Dirt Music Soundtrack	2:30	
2020	"I Will Put My Ship In Order"	Dirt Music Soundtrack	3:33	
2020	"Stolen Car" (trio with: Julia Stone, George Mason)	Dirt Music Soundtrack	4:04	
2020	"Make Me A Pallet On Your Floor" (trio with: Julia Stone, George Mason)	Dirt Music Soundtrack	1:58	
2020	"I'm Here" (trio with: Julia Stone, George Mason)	Dirt Music Soundtrack	3:07	
2020	"Song To The Siren" (trio with: Julia Stone, George Mason)	Dirt Music Soundtrack	2:58	
2020	"Storm Clouds" (trio with: Julia Stone, George Mason)	Dirt Music Soundtrack	3:16	

=== Soundtrack Tulsa King (Paramount Music) ===
Tulsa King: Music from the Original Series
Year	Song	Album	Time	Ref.
2024	"Ramblin' Man"	Tulsa King Soundtrack: Seasons 1–2	1:46	
2024	"Tush"	Tulsa King Soundtrack: Seasons 1–2	2:19	
2024	"Never Been To Spain"	Tulsa King Soundtrack: Seasons 1–2	3:55	
2024	"Nothing I Can Do About It Now"	Tulsa King Soundtrack: Seasons 1–2	2:16	
2024	"My Rifle, My Pony & Me"	Tulsa King Soundtrack: Seasons 1–2	2:38	
2024	"Another Somebody Done Somebody Wrong Song"	Tulsa King Soundtrack: Seasons 1–2	3:24	

=== Other songs ===
Year	Song	Artist(s)	Notes	Time	Ref.
2014	"Fall Apart"	Garrett Hedlund	Lullaby (soundtrack)	5:08	
2015	"Can't Help It"	Garrett Hedlund	Mojave (soundtrack); Also singer-songwriter	3:23	
2022	"The Road"	Garrett Hedlund	Also singer-songwriter	3:21	
2022	"Tulsa Night"	Garrett Hedlund	Also singer-songwriter	3:34	
2022	"Tulsa Night" (feat. Caitlin Rose)	Garrett Hedlund (duet with Caitlin Rose)	Also singer-songwriter	3:34	
2022	"Take My Loving Heart"	Garrett Hedlund (duet with Scarlett Burke)	Make It Up as We Go (soundtrack); Also singer-songwriter	3:27	
2022	"Gain A Little Ground"	Garrett Hedlund (trio with: Shooter Jennings, Scarlett Burke)	Make It Up as We Go (soundtrack); Also singer-songwriter	3:43	
2022	"More Like Home"	Garrett Hedlund		3:20	
2022	"Best Ones"	Garrett Hedlund		3:23	
2022	"Always Wanted To"	Garrett Hedlund		3:37	
2023	"Day One"	Garrett Hedlund	Also singer-songwriter	4:06	
2023	"Desperation Road"	Garrett Hedlund	Desperation Road (soundtrack); Also singer-songwriter	2:50	
2025	"River, Again"	Garrett Hedlund	Also singer-songwriter	3:17	

=== Chart history ===
Hedlund's duet with Meester—"Give In to Me"— was the only song to chart as a single, reaching No. 79 on the Billboard Hot 100 and No. 96 on the Canadian Hot 100.

== Awards and nominations ==
Award	Year	Category	Nominated work	Result	Ref.
Teen Choice Awards	2004	Choice Breakout Movie Star	Troy	Nominated	
Black Reel Awards	2006	Best Ensemble	Four Brothers	Nominated	
Saturn Award	2011	Best Supporting Actor	Tron: Legacy	Nominated	
Young Hollywood Awards	2011	Actor of the Year	Tron: Legacy	Won	
Maui Film Festival	2011	Rising Star	Tron: Legacy	Won	
MTV Movie & TV Awards	2011	Best Breakthrough Male Performance	Tron: Legacy	Nominated	
Glamour Awards	2011	Man of the Year	—	Won	
International Online Cinema Awards (INOCA)	2013	Best Supporting Actor	On the Road	Nominated	
Gotham Awards	2017	Best Ensemble Performance	Mudbound	Won	
Awards Circuit Community Awards (ACCA)	2017	Best Cast Ensemble	Mudbound	Nominated	
Black Film Critics Circle Awards	2017	BFCC Award (Best Ensemble)	Mudbound	Won	
Hollywood Film Awards	2017	Best Breakout Ensemble	Mudbound	Won	
Independent Spirit Awards	2018	Robert Altman Award (Best Ensemble)	Mudbound	Won	
Screen Actors Guild Awards	2018	Outstanding Performance by a Cast in a Motion Picture	Mudbound	Nominated	
Online Film & Television Association	2018	Best Ensemble	Mudbound	Nominated	
CinEuphoria Awards	2019	Best Ensemble - International Competition	Mudbound	Nominated	
