= Chris Martin =

English singer-songwriter (born 1977)

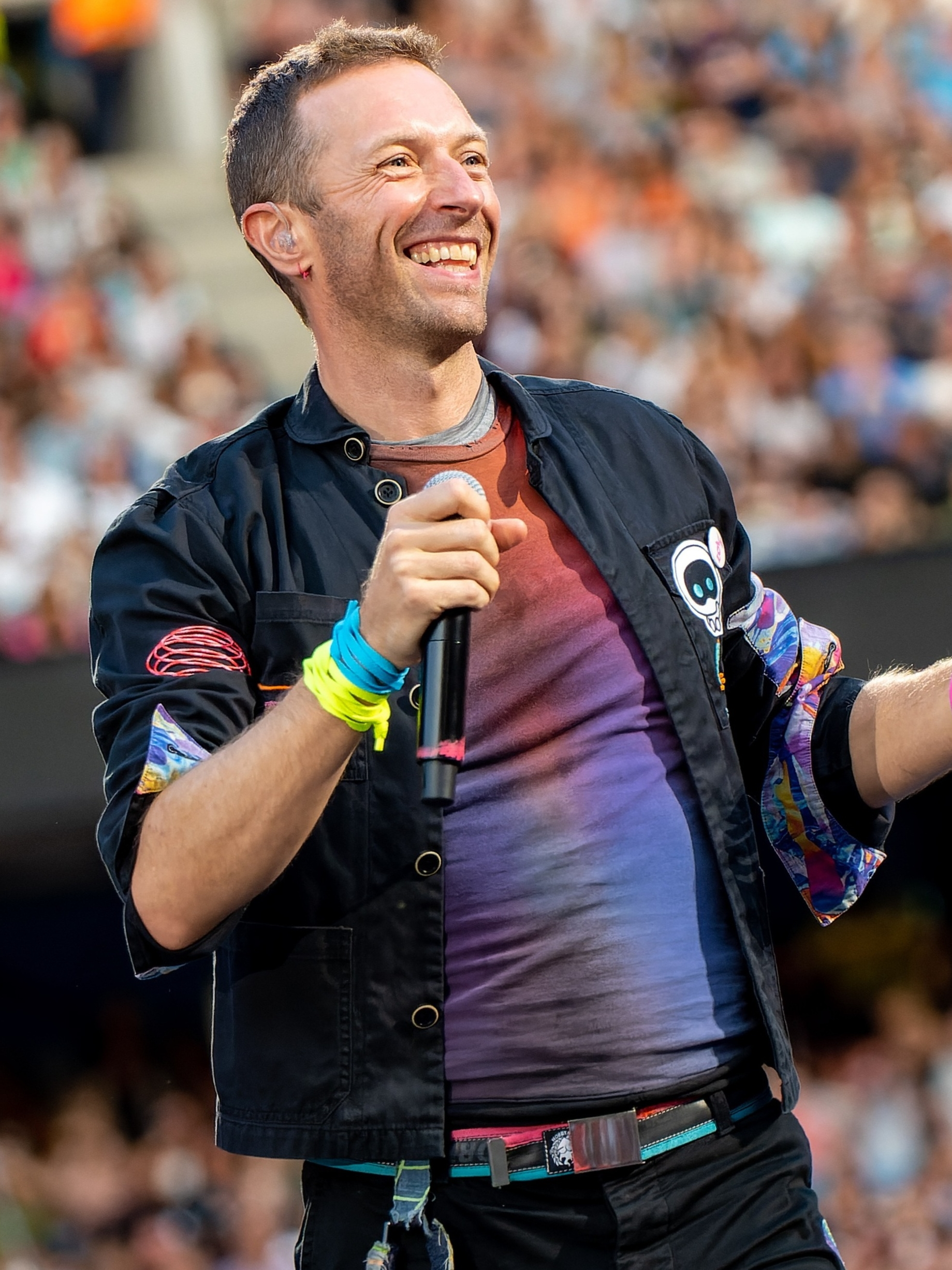
- Martin at Etihad Stadium in 2023
- Born: Christopher Anthony John Martin; 2 March 1977 (age 49); Exeter, Devon, England
- Education: University College London
- Occupations: Singer-songwriter; musician; record producer
- Years active: 1997–present
- Spouse: Gwyneth Paltrow (m. 2003; div. 2016)
- Partner: Dakota Johnson (2017–2025)
- Children: 2, including Apple
- Awards: Full list
- Musical career
- Origin: London, England
- Genres: Alternative rock; pop rock; post-Britpop; pop
- Instruments: Vocals; piano; keyboards; guitar; harmonica
- Labels: Fierce Panda; Parlophone; Nettwerk; Capitol; Atlantic
- Member of: Coldplay

Christopher Anthony John Martin (born 2 March 1977) is an English singer-songwriter and record producer. He is best known as the vocalist, pianist and co-founder of the rock band Coldplay, which he formed with Jonny Buckland, Guy Berryman and Will Champion, at University College London. They rose to global stardom through Parachutes (2000) and subsequent albums.

Martin received seven Grammy Awards and nine Brit Awards as part of Coldplay. They have sold over 170 million records worldwide, becoming the most successful group of the 21st century. The Independent and the Evening Standard ranked Martin among the most influential British public figures, while American Songwriter named him one of the best male singers of the 21st century.

== Early life ==
Christopher Anthony John Martin was born on 2 March 1977 in Exeter, Devon, England. He is the eldest of five children. His father, Anthony John Martin, is a retired chartered accountant. His mother, Alison Martin, is a music teacher from Zimbabwe. His family's caravan and motorhome sales business, Martin's of Exeter, was founded in 1929 by his grandfather, who served as High Sheriff and Mayor of Exeter. His great-great-grandfather, William Willett, successfully campaigned for British Summer Time to become a universally acknowledged practice.

Martin lived with his family in Zimbabwe when he was 10 years old. He attended the Hylton and Exeter Cathedral primary schools in England, where he found his passion for music. He then attended Sherborne School, where he met Coldplay manager Phil Harvey, and where he was president of the Sting fan club and played with Harvey in a blues band called the Rockin' Honkies.

Before Martin attended university, he worked at Shed Studios, for which he wrote musical jingles for plays at St. George's College, Harare. He then studied at University College London, where he earned a first-class honours degree in Greek and Latin.

== Career ==
=== Coldplay ===
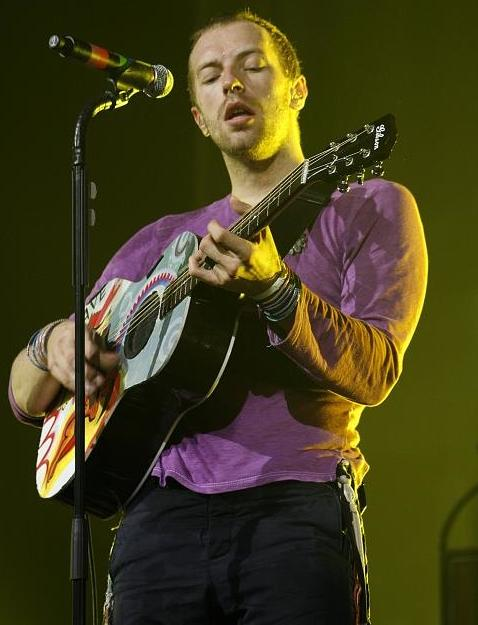
Martin performing on the Viva la Vida Tour in 2010

Martin co-founded the band along with Jonny Buckland after they met during orientation week at university in 1996. The pair spent the rest of the year planning a band and began writing their first songs together in early 1997, rehearsing nightly. Guy Berryman joined the group in the following months and the group recorded numerous demos without a drummer. By November, the trio was known as Big Fat Noises. In 1998, they became Starfish "in a panic", after Will Champion scheduled their debut live performance at the Laurel Tree only a few days after joining the band. Weeks later, the band settled on the name Coldplay, suggested by his friend Tim Crompton. He had considered it for his own band after finding a copy of Philip Horky's Child's Reflections, Cold Play (1997), but discarded the idea.

Since the release of their debut album, Parachutes, in 2000, the band have achieved international recognition and commercial success. Their song "Yellow", from Parachutes, entered the charts at number four and became the group's breakthrough.

=== Solo work ===
Martin has written songs for a variety of artists, including Embrace ("Gravity") and Jamelia ("See It in a Boy's Eyes", co-written with Rik Simpson). He has also collaborated with Ron Sexsmith, Faultline, the Streets, and Ian McCulloch. In 2004, he sang on the Band Aid 20 single "Do They Know It's Christmas?". In 2005, Martin worked with Nelly Furtado on "All Good Things (Come to an End)" for her album Loose (2006). The two were once rumoured to be a couple after performing together at Glastonbury Festival in 2002. Furtado joked about it, saying, "Yeah, he's my boyfriend—he just doesn't know it yet".

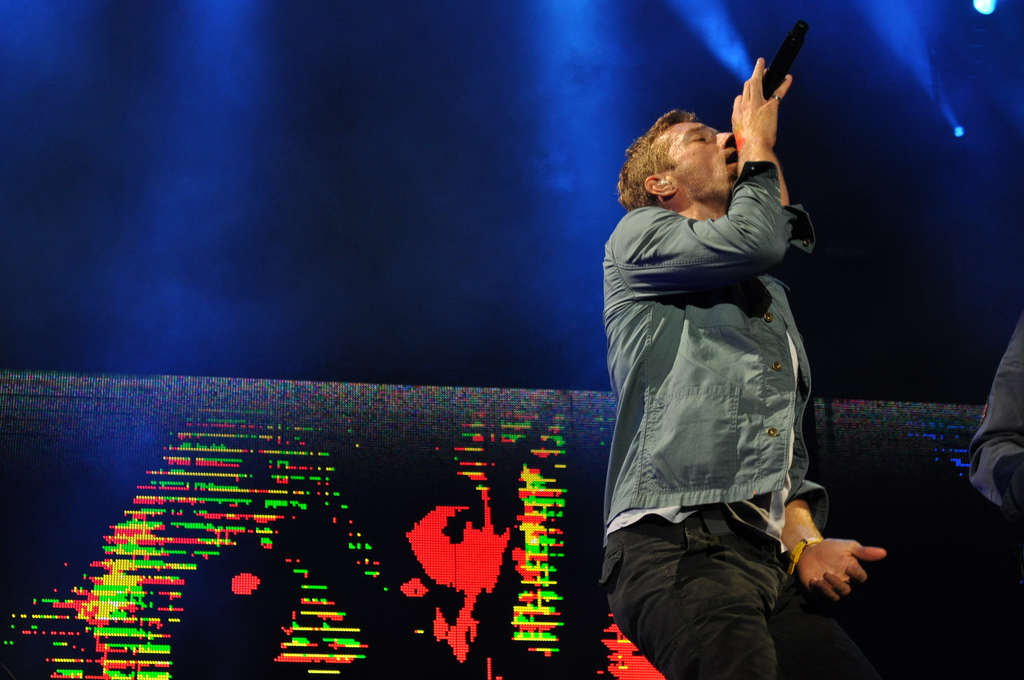
Martin performing at the Music Midtown festival in Atlanta

Martin's interest in hip hop led to a collaboration with rapper Jay-Z on the song "Beach Chair" for the album Kingdom Come (2006). Martin supplied chords and Coldplay producer Rik Simpson created the drum pattern; Jay-Z then brought in Dr. Dre to mix the track. Martin and Jay-Z performed "Beach Chair" at Royal Albert Hall on 27 September 2006. He also recorded the chorus for Kanye West's "Homecoming" on Graduation (2007), following an impromptu jam session at Abbey Road Studios the same year.

In 2015, Martin collaborated with Avicii during sessions for Avicii's album, Stories (2015). Their first joint composition, "Heaven", originated in that period, with Simon Aldred of Cherry Ghost providing early vocals. Martin also sang on "True Believer". In 2017, he performed "A Different Corner" at the Brit Awards in tribute to George Michael. Martin co-wrote "Homesick" for Dua Lipa's self-titled debut album, Dua Lipa (2017). In 2019, Martin was featured on Avicii's posthumous album, Tim (2019); the song "Heaven" features vocals by Martin and was written by Avicii and Martin prior to Avicii's death in 2018.

=== Philanthropy ===
In December 2012, Martin performed three songs for the 12/12/12: The Concert for Sandy Relief fundraiser, which aided Hurricane Sandy victims. Two years later, he joined Band Aid 30 to record a new version of "Do They Know It's Christmas?" at Notting Hill's Sarm West Studios, helping raise money for the 2014 Ebola crisis in West Africa; this marked his second contribution to the franchise, after Band Aid 20. In September 2015, he became the creative director of the Global Citizen Festival. InFocus, a charity dedicated to vision impairment and complex needs, launched and named Exeter's Martin House after him in 2025; the place works as a residential care facility for young people.

=== Other projects ===
Martin and Coldplay guitarist Jonny Buckland made cameo appearances in the film Shaun of the Dead as supporters of the fictional charity ZombAid. In 2006, Martin had a cameo on the Ricky Gervais and Stephen Merchant comedy Extras. He also appears singing in the closing credits of Brüno (2009), along with Bono, Sting, Slash, Snoop Dogg and Elton John. In March 2015, Martin attended the televised launch of music streaming service Tidal via a video link, and, along with other artists, was introduced as a shareholder.

== Influences ==
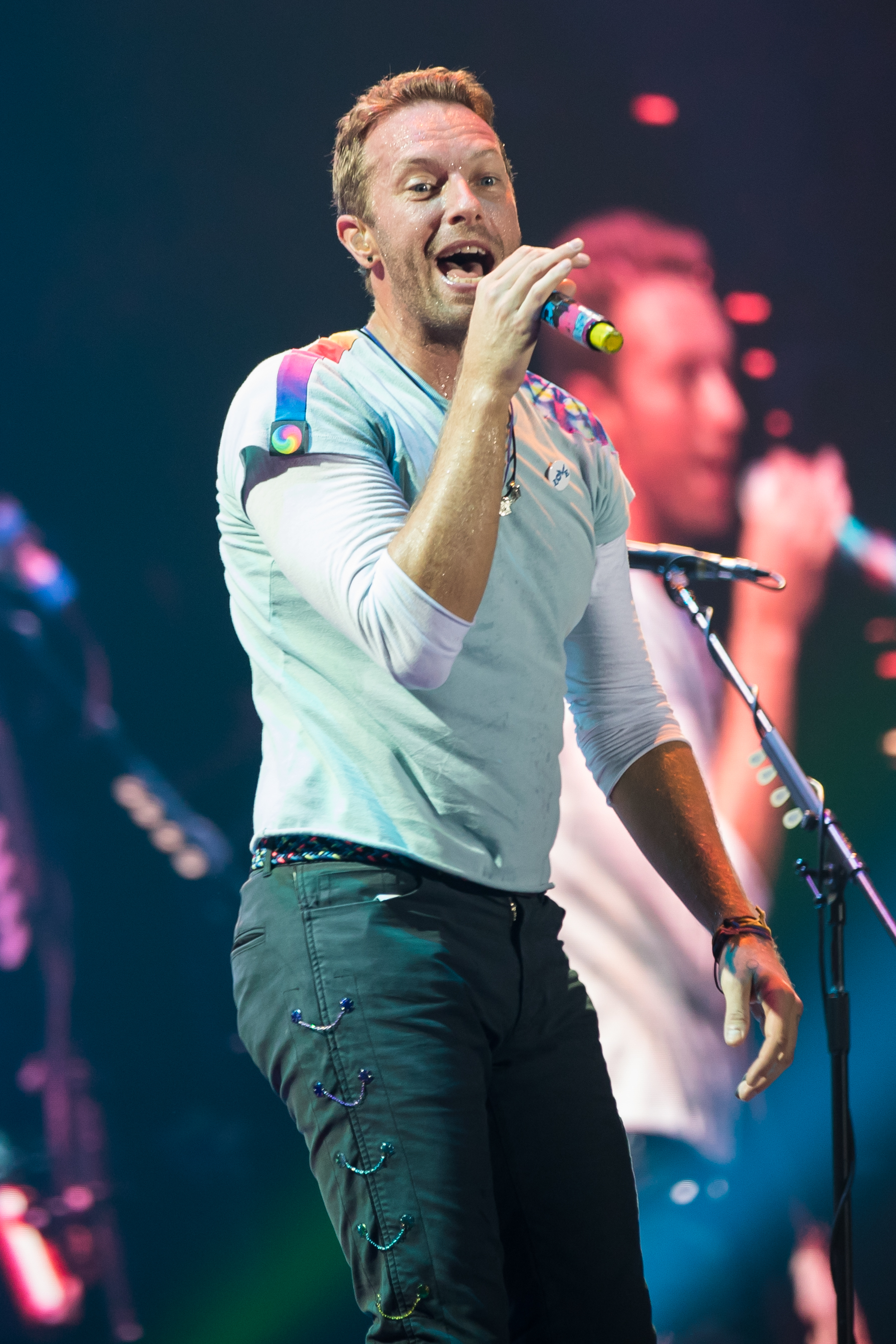
Martin performing with Coldplay in 2017

A major influence on Martin and Coldplay was the Scottish rock band Travis, with Martin crediting the band for the creation of his own band. The Irish rock band U2 is another important influence on Martin both musically and politically. Martin wrote for Rolling Stone's "100 Greatest Artists of All Time" on the band, saying: "I don't buy weekend tickets to Ireland and hang out in front of their gates, but U2 are the only band whose entire catalogue I know by heart. The first song on The Unforgettable Fire, "A Sort of Homecoming", I know backward and forward—it's so rousing, brilliant, and beautiful. It's one of the first songs I played to my unborn baby." Martin has also been influenced by Radiohead.

Martin is very vocal about his love for Norwegian synth-pop band a-ha. In 2005, he stated in an interview: "I found myself in Amsterdam the other day and I put a-ha's first record on. I just remembered how much I loved it. It's incredible songwriting. Everyone asks what inspired us, what we've been trying to steal from and what we listened to as we were growing up—the first band I ever loved was a-ha." Martin has also performed live together with Magne Furuholmen of a-ha, introducing him as "the best keyboard player in the world". In November 2011, he stated that "back when we didn't have any hits of our own we used to play a-ha songs."

Martin is also a fan of the English rock bands Oasis and Muse; Irish pop group Westlife; English-Irish girl group Girls Aloud; English pop group Take That; and Canadian indie rock band Arcade Fire. During an interview from 2011, Martin cited the Beatles, the Rolling Stones and Bob Marley among his favourite acts. In 2014, he inducted Peter Gabriel into the Rock and Roll Hall of Fame for his solo career.

Coldplay performed R.E.M.'s "Nightswimming" with Michael Stipe during their Austin City Limits performance in 2005, as a part of the Twisted Logic Tour. Martin went on to call "Nightswimming" "the greatest song ever written". He has called Richard Ashcroft, formerly of the Verve, "the best singer in the world". He also admires the lyrics of Morrissey. Martin was quoted as calling Coldplay's song "Shiver" a rip-off of Jeff Buckley influenced by Buckley's song "Grace". In 2008, Coldplay released an alternate music video for "Viva la Vida", directed by Anton Corbijn as a tribute to the music video for Depeche Mode's "Enjoy the Silence". It shows Martin dressed as a king, as Dave Gahan was in the original video. The band stated: "This is our attempt at a video cover version, made out of love for Depeche Mode and the genius of Anton Corbijn".

== Personal life ==
According to The Times in May 2023, Martin had an estimated net worth of £160 million. In a 2012 interview with the Daily Mirror, Martin revealed that he had been suffering from tinnitus since his early adult years, although he said that he had noticed the symptoms even as a teenager "while listening to loud music". As a result, Martin wears specially filtered earplugs or customised in-ear monitors while performing and has encouraged his bandmates to do the same as a preventive measure. Similarly, he has encouraged his children to wear hearing protection at concerts. Martin has also become an advocate for hearing loss awareness, having partnered with the Royal National Institute for Deaf People. PETA named Martin the World's Sexiest Vegetarian in 2005. However, he began eating meat again after divorcing from his then-wife, Gwyneth Paltrow.

Martin is a supporter of Exeter City. He is also ambidextrous. In February 2020, a cassette tape was discovered by a former fellow pupil of Martin's. It contained a three-minute instrumental piece titled "Electric Thunder", which was composed by Martin, aged 12, at Exeter Cathedral School. Martin played keyboards on the track accompanying other pupils performing in a group called Grandisson Ensemble. The cassette was expected to sell for £600 at auction; it ultimately fetched £840. Martin has a habit of going barefoot, in particular while rehearsing for Coldplay shows. He also has performed the songs "All My Love" and "We Pray" with no shoes on Saturday Night Live.

=== Relationships ===
According to one source, Martin previously had a relationship with live events producer Lily Sobhani around the Parachutes album release. He and Gwyneth Paltrow married on 5 December 2003. Their daughter Apple was born in May 2004 in London. Martin and the band released a song titled "I am your baby's daddy" under the name "the Nappies" in anticipation of her birth. Coldplay's "Speed of Sound" was also inspired by Martin's experience and awe at becoming a father, being the lead single for the band's X&Y album. Actor Simon Pegg and Martin's bandmate Jonny Buckland are his daughter's godfathers, and Martin is godfather to Pegg's daughter. His second child was born in April 2006 in New York City. The name was inspired by a song of the same name. In March 2014, Martin and Paltrow announced their separation as a "conscious uncoupling" after ten years of marriage. Paltrow filed for divorce in April 2015 and it was finalised on 14 July 2016. From August 2015 to August 2017, he was in an on-and-off relationship with actress Annabelle Wallis. Martin began dating American actress Dakota Johnson afterwards. They resided in Malibu, California. In 2024, it was revealed the couple had been engaged for several years. In June 2025, People reported that they had split up after eight years of dating.

=== Political views ===
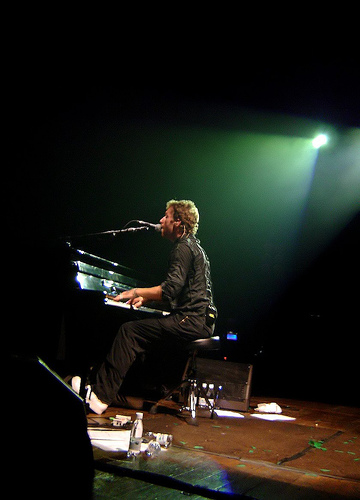
Martin playing piano at a concert in Brazil in 2007

Despite predominantly living in the United States, Martin still votes in the United Kingdom. In 2006, The Guardian circulated an April Fools' Day piece claiming that the singer would endorse Conservative Party leader David Cameron and write his campaign song for the elections. In 2019, Martin said that he would "probably vote Liberal Democrat" that year. He has been outspoken on issues related to fair trade and campaigned for Oxfam's Make Trade Fair campaign. He travelled to Ghana and Haiti to meet farmers and view the effects of unfair trade practices.

Martin used to perform with variations of the Make Trade Fair logo written on the back of his hand. He also criticised President George W. Bush for the 2003 invasion of Iraq. During a Teenage Cancer Trust show at Royal Albert Hall, he encouraged the crowd to sing against war. The singer endorsed Democratic presidential candidate John Kerry while accepting honours at the 46th Annual Grammy Awards, while his wardrobe for the Viva la Vida Tour (2008–2010) included Barack Obama armbands.

While touring Australia in 2009, Martin and the rest of Coldplay were the opening act at the Sound Relief benefit concert at the Sydney Cricket Ground, for the victims of bushfires and floods in Victoria and Queensland. In 2012, Martin endorsed the Robin Hood tax package, which proposed a levy on stock trades in the United States. In 2016, he voted Remain at the United Kingdom European Union membership referendum. In 2023, Martin expressed support for Palestine in the Gaza war, stating "We don't believe in oppression, occupation, terrorism or genocide". When asked about the 2024 United States presidential election, he mentioned that his general leanings "would probably be described as extremely Democratic".

== Discography ==
=== With Coldplay ===
- Parachutes (2000)
- A Rush of Blood to the Head (2002)
- X&Y (2005)
- Viva la Vida or Death and All His Friends (2008)
- Mylo Xyloto (2011)
- Ghost Stories (2014)
- A Head Full of Dreams (2015)
- Everyday Life (2019)
- Music of the Spheres (2021)
- Moon Music (2024)

=== Solo credits ===
List of solo credits
Year	Song	Artist	Album	Role	Ref.
2001	"What's Going On" (The London Version)	Artists Against AIDS Worldwide	—	Featured artist · keyboard	
2002	"Where Is My Boy?"	Faultline	Your Love Means Everything	Featured artist · co-writer	
2002	"Your Love Means Everything Part 2"	Faultline	Your Love Means Everything	Featured artist · co-writer	
2002	"Gold in Them Hills"	Ron Sexsmith	Cobblestone Runway	Piano	
2003	"Sliding"	Ian McCulloch	Slideling	Backing vocal	
2003	"Arthur"	Ian McCulloch	Slideling	Backing vocal · piano	
2003	"See It in a Boy's Eyes"	Jamelia	Thank You	Co-writer · backing vocal · piano	
2004	"Everybody's Happy Nowadays"	Ash	"Orpheus"	Backing vocal	
2004	"Do They Know It's Christmas?"	Band Aid 20	—	Featured artist	
2005	"What Ever Happened to the Cosmic Kid?"	Various	The Electric Institute	Co-writer	
2006	"All Good Things (Come to an End)"	Nelly Furtado	Loose	Co-writer	
2006	"In the Sun"	Michael Stipe	In the Sun (Gulf Coast Relief)	Featured artist	(Note: "In the Sun" won Best Soundtrack at the 2010 Maverick Movie Awards.)
2006	"Beach Chair"	Jay-Z	Kingdom Come	Featured artist · producer	
2007	"Homecoming"	Kanye West	Graduation	Featured artist · co-writer	
2009	"Want"	Natalie Imbruglia	Come to Life	Co-writer · keyboard	
2009	"Dove of Peace"	Brüno Gehard	Brüno	Featured artist	
2010	"Most Kingz"	Jay-Z	—	Featured artist	
2010	"Me and Tennessee"	Tim McGraw · Gwyneth Paltrow	Country Strong	Writer · co-producer	(Note: "Me and Tennessee" was shortlisted for Best Original Song at the 83rd Academy Awards.)
2010	"Halo" (Live)	Beyoncé	Hope for Haiti Now	Featured artist · piano	
2012	"I Don't Want You to Die"	The Flaming Lips	The Flaming Lips and Heady Fwends	Featured artist	
2012	"Viva la Vida" (Live)	—	12-12-12: The Concert for Sandy Relief	Featured artist	
2012	"Losing My Religion" (Live)	Michael Stipe	12-12-12: The Concert for Sandy Relief	Featured artist	
2012	"Us Against the World" (Live)	—	12-12-12: The Concert for Sandy Relief	Featured artist	
2014	"Invictus Games Anthem"	Various	—	Writer	
2014	"Do They Know It's Christmas?"	Band Aid 30	—	Featured artist	
2015	"True Believer"	Avicii	Stories	Co-writer · backing vocal · piano	
2015	"Every Day's Like Christmas"	Kylie Minogue	Kylie Christmas	Co-writer · backing vocal (Note: With exception of tracks 5, 7, 10, 13, 21 and 22, Martin performed backing vocals in all songs from the album's Snow Queen edition.)	
2016	"Electricity"	David Brent	Life on the Road	Featured artist	
2017	"Homesick"	Dua Lipa	Dua Lipa	Co-writer · backing vocal · piano	
2018	"Keep Talking"	Rita Ora · Julia Michaels	Phoenix	Unknown (Note: Ora stated that Martin "helped take this song to another level" and "put that Chris Martin dust on it", though his name does not appear in the liner notes.)	
2019	"Joyride"	Big Sean	—	Featured artist	
2019	"Someone That Loves You '19"	Izzy Bizu	Glita	Featured artist	
2019	"Heaven"	Avicii	Tim	Featured artist · co-writer · keyboard	
2019	"Stratosphere"	Beck	Hyperspace	Backing vocal	
2020	"Sondela Forever"	Muzi	—	Co-writer · producer	
2020	"Times Like These"	Live Lounge Allstars	—	Featured artist · piano	
2020	"Monsters You Made"	Burna Boy	Twice as Tall	Featured artist · co-writer	
2021	"Red Love"	Emmanuel Kelly	Your Story	Executive producer	
2021	"Love Is a Mighty River"	Merry Clayton	Beautiful Scars	Co-writer	
2022	"Across the Oceans"	Mamak Khadem	Remembrance	Featured artist · piano	
2022	"Riptide"	The Chainsmokers	So Far So Good	Co-writer	
2023	"Queen"	Muzi	uMuzi	Featured artist	
2023	"Astronaut"	Griff	Vert1go Vol. 1	Piano	
2024	"Over You"	Jacob Collier · Aespa	Djesse Vol. 4	Featured artist	
2024	"Raze the Bar"	Travis · Brandon Flowers	L.A. Times	Backing vocal	
2024	"Wandering Talk"	Orlando le Fleming · Romantic Funk	Wandering Talk	Featured artist	
2025	"Ma Meilleure Ennemie" (Extended Version)	Stromae · Pomme · Coldplay	Arcane League of Legends: Season 2	Co-writer	
2025	"Breathe"	The Chainsmokers	Breathe	Co-writer	
2026	"Human"	Robbie Williams · Jesse & Joy	Britpop	Keyboard · guitar · synthesiser	
2026	"Go"	Blackpink	Deadline	Co-writer	
2026	"Light Up"	Kylie Minogue	—	Co-writer	(Note: "Light Up" was nominated for Best Original Song in a Documentary at the 17th Hollywood Music in Media Awards.)

== Filmography ==
=== Film ===
List of film appearances
Year	Title	Details	Ref.
2003	Mayor of the Sunset Strip	Documentary interview	
2004	Shaun of the Dead	Cameo appearance	
2004	Band Aid 20: Justice, Not Charity	Documentary interview	
2006	"God's Gonna Cut You Down" (Johnny Cash version)	Cameo appearance	
2009	Brüno	Cameo appearance	
2009	Shadow Play: The Making of Anton Corbijn	Documentary interview	
2017	Avicii: True Stories	Documentary interview	
2018	The Chainsmokers: Memories	Documentary interview	
2024	Camden	Documentary interview	
2024	Music by John Williams	Documentary interview	
2024	Avicii – I'm Tim	Documentary interview	
2025	Counting Crows: Have You Seen Me Lately?	Documentary interview	
2026	James: Getting Away with It	Documentary interview	

=== Television ===
List of television appearances
Year	Title	Details	Ref.
2006	Extras	Season 2, Episode 4: "Chris Martin" guest appearance	
2011	Saturday Night Live	Season 37, Episode 6: "Garth & Kat" sketch	
2014	Saturday Night Live	Season 39, Episode 19: "Spider-Man Kiss" sketch	
2016	Barely Famous	Season 2, Episode 3: "No Scrubs" guest appearance	
2017	Modern Family	Season 9, Episode 8: "Brushes with Celebrity" guest appearance	
2020	Curb Your Enthusiasm	Season 10, Episode 6: "The Surprise Party" guest appearance	
2020	The Rock & Roll Hall of Fame 2020 Inductions	Depeche Mode guest appearance	
2020	The Tonight Show Starring Jimmy Fallon	Season 8, Episode 54: "Fallonlore: The 30 Rock Sessions" sketch	

== See also ==
- List of people associated with University College London
- List of British Grammy winners and nominees
- List of best-selling music artists
- List of highest-grossing live music artists
- List of artists who reached number one on the UK Singles Chart
- List of barefooters
- List of most expensive divorces
