= Conscious uncoupling =

Type of divorce

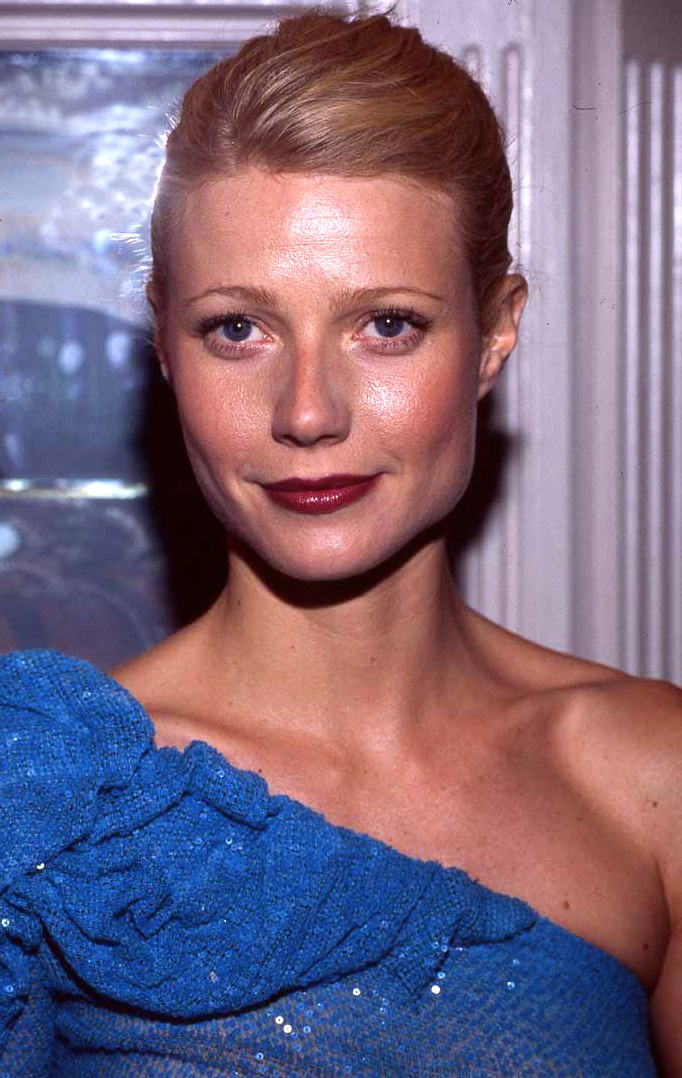
Paltrow, who popularized the neologism

Conscious uncoupling is a term coined in 2009 by relationship expert and author Katherine Woodward Thomas to describe a structured approach to separation or divorce that emphasizes emotional awareness, personal responsibility, and mutual respect. The concept was later developed into a five-step process outlined in her 2015 book Conscious Uncoupling: 5 Steps to Living Happily Even After. The term gained widespread public attention in 2014 when actress Gwyneth Paltrow used it to describe her separation from musician Chris Martin.

== Background ==
Sociologist Diane Vaughan proposed an "uncoupling theory" in 1986. Vaughan saw the process where a relationship reaches a crossroads, when both parties realize that "everything went dead inside". It usually is followed by a lengthy phase, during which one of the partners (the "respondent") holds on to the failing relationship, in spite of unconsciously knowing that it is coming to the end.

Vaughan perceived the process of the breakup affecting the initiator and respondent unevenly. While the breakup initiator "has begun mourning the loss of the relationship", the respondent has not. Vaughan suggests that "to make their own transition out of the relationship, partners must redefine initiator and relationship negatively, legitimating the dissolution".

Vaughan proposed that "getting out of a relationship includes a redefinition of self at several levels: in the private thoughts of the individual, between partners, and in the larger social context in which the relationship exists".

Vaughan sees the uncoupling process as finished when "the partners have defined themselves and are defined by others as separate and independent of each other - when being partners is no longer a major source of identity".

Marriage and family therapist Katherine Woodward Thomas has been credited with coining the term in 2009.

== Usage ==
Gwyneth Paltrow popularized the term "conscious uncoupling" to describe her separation from Chris Martin.

== Criticism ==
Tracy Schorn commented that the term was being received with "the snark and derision it so rightly deserves."
