= Country Strong (soundtrack) =

Country Strong: Original Motion Picture Soundtrack

Soundtrack album by Various artists
- Released: October 26, 2010
- Genres: Country, country pop, blues, soundtrack
- Length: 50:34
- Label: RCA Nashville
- Producer: Various Michael Knox

Singles from Country Strong
- 1. "Country Strong" Released: July 26, 2010; 2. "A Little Bit Stronger" Released: September 27, 2010; 3. "Me and Tennessee" Released: February 22, 2011

Country Strong is a soundtrack album for the film of the same name. It was released by RCA Nashville on October 26, 2010. It is preceded by two singles: the title track, performed by the film's star Gwyneth Paltrow, which was released on July 26, 2010, and "A Little Bit Stronger", performed by Sara Evans and released on September 27, 2010. In addition to Paltrow, the film's co-stars Garrett Hedlund, Tim McGraw and Leighton Meester all sing on the soundtrack, which also features country music stars Lee Ann Womack, Hank Williams Jr., and Faith Hill, among others. The album has sold 479,000 copies in the US as of February 2013. A follow-up album Country Strong (More Music from the Motion Picture), was released on December 21, 2010, originally as digital download only. The second album has sold 36,349 in the US as of January 2011.

== Critical reception ==
Professional ratings
Review scores
Source	Rating
Allmusic	3/5 stars
Empire Online	4/5 stars
Entertainment Weekly	B
Roughstock	3.5/5 stars
Country Weekly	3/5 stars
The Boston Phoenix	1/4 stars

Stephen Thomas Erlewine of Allmusic wrote the soundtrack "follows the blueprint of its star, McGraw, and the early work of his wife Faith Hill, delivering a collection of crisp, clean, and melodic country where the Hank Williams Jr. cameo is used as rowdy flavoring. If Paltrow never quite sounds convincing as a country singer -- she seems just a little too mannered to be 'Country Strong' -- Gossip Girl Leighton Meester pulls off the sweet 'Words I Couldn't Say' with ease, and the rest of the soundtrack is handed over to professionals".

Empire Online's Danny Graydon gave the soundtrack a four-star rating out of five explaining Gwyneth Paltrow is really good. "[She] more than holds her own among such esteemed company as Lee Ann Womack (Liars Lie), Hank Williams Jr. (Thirsty) and Faith Hill (Give In To Me), her voice driving the stomping 'Shake That Thing', the anthemic title track, and 'Me & Tennessee', a gorgeous duet with Tim McGraw." Entertainment Weekly writer Mikael Wood was convinced by Paltrow in the title track but not in "Shake That Thing". For the rest, he said "Elsewhere you get solid new songs from the likes of Sara Evans, Ronnie Dunn, and Patty Loveless"

Matt Bjorke of Roughstock described Paltrow's "Country Strong" as a "solid, down the middle 'I will survive' ballad." Though he shared the same opinion as Mikael Wood concerning her performance on "Shake That Thing" by saying the song doesn't suit her, he liked "Coming Home", calling it an "Oscar worthy ballad". He continued, "While Gwyneth acquits herself nicely on two out of three songs, the biggest surprises on the album are her co-stars Garrett Hedlund and Leighton Meester." He praised Hedlund's performance on "Chances Are" by saying "the best song on this album belongs to him." He noted his voice recalls Charlie Robison with a slice of Kris Kristofferson which suits country music quite well. He also explained, "Meester certainly comes off sounding closely along the lines of the folksy singer/songwriters like Colbie Caillat and Sara Bareilles and the obvious comparison, Taylor Swift.

Country Weekly gave the release three stars saying "While the album holds together better than many soundtracks, it's divided between country songs and pop-country songs. Some are super, some so-so; some are sung by actors (Garrett Hedlund being the most convincing of the bunch) and some are delivered by serious country singers."

The Boston Phoenix was negative about the soundtrack, "This steaming pile of songs is emblematic of the state of mainstream country music – all artifice, no heart, calculated anthems written to formula and meant, like the film itself, to do no more than capitalize on the genre's current success and rob its undiscriminating fans." He found Paltrow's performances "pointless". He also disliked the tracks by Sara Evans, Lee Ann Womack, Trace Adkins, and Tim McGraw because of their lack of character. He pointed out the drinking songs – Hank Williams Jr.'s "Thirsty" and Ronnie Dunn's "She's Actin' Single (I'm Drinkin' Doubles)" – are the only ones "offering humor and humanity".

== Track listing ==
Country Strong: Original Motion Picture Soundtrack
No.	Title	Writer(s)	Artist(s)	Length
1.	"Country Strong"	Jennifer Hanson, Tony Martin, Mark Nesler	Gwyneth Paltrow	4:15
2.	"Love Don't Let Me Down"	Marv Green, Troy Olsen	Chris Young and Patty Loveless	2:57
3.	"A Little Bit Stronger"	Luke Laird, Hillary Lindsey, Hillary Scott	Sara Evans	5:03
4.	"Chances Are"	Nathan Chapman, Lori McKenna, Liz Rose	Garrett Hedlund	3:25
5.	"Liars Lie"	Sally Barris, Morgane Hayes, Rose	Lee Ann Womack	5:19
6.	"She's Actin' Single (I'm Drinkin' Doubles)"	Wayne Carson Thompson	Ronnie Dunn	3:28
7.	"Shake That Thing"	Mark Irwin, Josh Kear, Chris Tompkins	Gwyneth Paltrow	3:54
8.	"Thirsty"	Dallas Davidson, Rhett Akins, Brett Eldredge	Hank Williams Jr.	3:12
9.	"Give In to Me"	Billy Falcon, Rose Falcon, Elisha Hoffman	Faith Hill	4:11
10.	"Timing Is Everything"	Natalie Hemby, Troy Jones	Trace Adkins
11.	"Words I Couldn't Say"	Gregory Becker, Tammi Kidd, Steve Robson	Leighton Meester	4:26
12.	"Coming Home"	Bob DiPiero, Tom Douglas, Lindsey, Troy Verges	Gwyneth Paltrow	4:13
13.	"Me and Tennessee"	Chris Martin	Tim McGraw and Gwyneth Paltrow	4:43

Country Strong: More Music from the Motion Picture
No.	Title	Writer(s)	Artist(s)	Length
1.	"Silver Wings"	Merle Haggard	Garrett Hedlund	3:21
2.	"A Little Bit Stronger"	Laird, Lindsey, Scott	Leighton Meester	5:17
3.	"A Fighter"	Tom Douglas, Ed Hill	Gwyneth Paltrow	4:33
4.	"Hard Out Here"	Hayes Carll	Garrett Hedlund	3:09
5.	"Summer Girl"	Jessica Andrews, Marcel, James T. Slater	Leighton Meester	3:22
6.	"Keep Me Hangin' On"	Ira Allen, Buddy Mize	Jypsi	3:36
7.	"Take Me Away"	Adam Carroll, John Evans	Hayes Carll	4:12
8.	"Kissin' In Cars"	Stephen Barker Liles, Rebekah Liles, Brad Warren, Brett Warren	Jesse Lee	3:30
9.	"Turn Loose the Horses"	Hayes Carll	Garrett Hedlund	3:05
10.	"Travis"	Matt Kinsey	Gwyneth Paltrow	4:49
11.	"Fly Again"	Chapman, Rose, Nicole Williams	Nikki Williams	3:55
12.	"Give In to Me"	B. Falcon, R. Falcon, Hoffman	Garrett Hedlund and Leighton Meester	3:29
13.	"Hide Me Babe"	Hayes Carll	Garrett Hedlund	3:08
14.	"Timing Is Everything"	Hemby, Jones	Garrett Hedlund	3:24

== Production ==
=== Original motion-picture soundtrack ===
According to The Boot:

- Byron Gallimore – tracks 1, 7, 12
- James Stroud – track 2
- Tony Brown – track 3
- Frank Liddell and Luke Wooten – track 4
- Frank Liddell and Chuck Ainlay – track 5
- Ronnie Dunn – track 6
- Michael Knox – track 8
- Jay Joyce – track 9
- Kenny Beard – track 10
- Nathan Chapman – track 11
- Byron Gallimore, Tim McGraw, A. Martin – track 13

== Chart performance ==
=== Album ===
==== Country Strong (Original Motion Picture Soundtrack) ====
Chart (2010–11)	Peak position
Canadian Albums Chart	21
US Billboard 200	6
US Billboard Country Albums	2
US Billboard Top Soundtracks	1

==== Country Strong (More Music from the Motion Picture) ====
Chart (2011)	Peak position
Canadian Albums Chart	71
US Billboard 200	23
US Billboard Country Albums	5
US Billboard Independent Albums	6
US Billboard Top Soundtracks	4

=== Singles ===
Year	Single	Artist	Peak chart positions			
Year	Single	Artist	US Country	US	CAN	UK
2010	"Country Strong"	Gwyneth Paltrow	30	81	—	—
2010	"A Little Bit Stronger"	Sara Evans	1	34	75	—
2011	"Me and Tennessee"	Tim McGraw and Gwyneth Paltrow	34	—	—	63
"—" denotes releases that did not chart

==== Other charted songs ====
Year	Single	Artist	Peak chart positions				Certifications
Year	Single	Artist	US Country	US	CAN	US Heat	Certifications
2011	"Give In to Me"	Faith Hill	56	—	—	—	
2011	"Give In to Me"	Garrett Hedlund and Leighton Meester	—	79	94	5	US: Gold
2011	"Summer Girl"^{A}	Leighton Meester	—	104	—	15	
2011	"Words I Couldn't Say"^{A}	Leighton Meester	—	120	—	25	
"—" denotes releases that did not chart

- ^{A}Did not enter the Hot 100 but charted on Bubbling Under Hot 100 Singles.

== Certifications ==
Region	Certification	Certified units/sales
United States (RIAA)	Gold	500,000^{^}
^{^} Shipments figures based on certification alone.
