= The Marsh King's Daughter =

2023 film by Neil Burger

- Theatrical release poster
- Directed by: Neil Burger
- Screenplay by: Elle Smith; Mark L. Smith
- Based on: The Marsh King's Daughter by Karen Dionne
- Produced by: Teddy Schwarzman; Keith Redmon; Mark L. Smith
- Starring: Daisy Ridley; Ben Mendelsohn; Garrett Hedlund; Caren Pistorius; Brooklynn Prince; Gil Birmingham
- Cinematography: Alwin H. Küchler
- Edited by: Naomi Geraghty
- Music by: Adam Janota Bzowski
- Production companies: Black Bear Pictures; Anonymous Content
- Distributed by: Lionsgate; Roadside Attractions; STXfilms (United States); Elevation Pictures (Canada); STXinternational (International)
- Release date: November 3, 2023
- Running time: 108 minutes
- Countries: United States; Canada
- Language: English
- Box office: $3.3 million

The Marsh King's Daughter is a 2023 psychological thriller film directed by Neil Burger and written by Elle Smith and Mark L. Smith, based on the 2017 novel of the same name by Karen Dionne. It stars Daisy Ridley, Ben Mendelsohn, Garrett Hedlund, Caren Pistorius, Brooklynn Prince, and Gil Birmingham.

The Marsh King's Daughter was released in the United States on November 3, 2023, by Lionsgate, Roadside Attractions and STXfilms to mixed reviews.

== Plot ==
Young Helena lives in the Northern Michigan wilderness with her mother Beth and her father Jacob. He teaches Helena how to track a deer through the forest. When they see it, Helena takes a shot, but misses, disappointing Jacob. Back home, Jacob gives Helena a tattoo on her forearm as a "reward". While hunting, Helena and Jacob encounter the paw of a trapped animal, and Jacob explains the animal gnawed its own arm off to escape. Helena's hunting improves, and Jacob gives her more tattoos.

While Jacob is out one day, a man arrives lost on an ATV. Beth begs the man to help them and drive them away before Jacob returns, but Helena refuses to get on the bike, confused by what her mother is saying. Jacob returns and kills the man, but Beth knocks Helena unconscious and drives them away. Helena wakes up in the office of Sheriff Clark, who promises her that she is now safe. Beth explains that Jacob kidnapped her and took her to the woods years before. Helena refuses to believe her mother. Jacob helps her escape the station, but the police arrive and arrest Jacob. Years later, Helena lives a normal suburban life with her husband Stephen and daughter Marigold, covering her facial tattoos with makeup. When asked about her background, Helena gives a fabricated story.

While being transported out of state, Jacob escapes. Helena returns to find the FBI and state police at her house. Special Agent Illing informs her that Jacob has escaped, and they are searching to see if she had any communication with him. Helena says that she has not had contact with him since she was ten. Stephen learns that Helena has kept her past secret from him and takes Marigold to a hotel for the night. Helena watches news coverage about her life in captivity and Beth's eventual suicide. Jacob is picked up at a gas station by an accomplice. Clark visits Helena to check on her. Helena explains that although Clark, Beth, and she became a family after the rescue, she felt her mother never wanted Helena around since she only saw Jacob in her. Clark assures her that her mother loved her and Stephen will forgive her.

Illing tells Helena that they identified Jacob's body in a burnt-out car near the Canadian border through forensic dentistry. Helena tells Stephen the truth about her childhood. She then takes Stephen and Marigold to meet Clark and he reminds Helena that Jacob misappropriated many of his people's Native American beliefs, including the tattoo on her hand which represents ownership rather than family. Helena wakes up from a nightmare thinking Jacob has broken into their house. She discovers fresh dirt on the floor, but it is only from Marigold's shoes. Helena sets up traps around the house and puts Marigold to bed, before reliving a memory of Beth giving her a straw doll. When a bell is triggered, Helena finds a dead rabbit strung up in a snare. Helena's paranoia grows when she finds straw dolls in Marigold's room.

When Helena travels to her abandoned childhood cabin, Jacob shows up, revealing he never stopped tracking her. Angered not to have met Marigold, he explains he wants to take Helena and Marigold to Canada to be a family again. Helena explains she has a new family and remembers the time she saw Jacob attempt to drown Beth for trying to escape. Jacob says that they had simply run away together, but Helena does not believe him. She asks Jacob to leave her and her family alone; he agrees and they hug goodbye.

Helena finds Clark, who followed her. She confesses to him that Jacob was there, but is now gone. Jacob reappears, kills Clark, and traps Helena. Jacob leaves, saying he will get Marigold so they can be a family. Helena escapes and retrieves Jacob's hunting rifle from the cabin. She tracks Jacob as he escapes in a canoe down the river and shoots him out of it. Helena continues to pursue Jacob through the wilderness. He hides in the marshland and shoots Helena in the leg, then forces her to lead him to the kayak that she used to get there. Helena throws herself and Jacob off a cliff into the river, badly injuring them both. Helena retrieves a gun and kills Jacob, telling him she remembers his lesson to always protect her family. Helena kayaks back to civilization and her family.

== Cast ==
- Daisy Ridley as Helena Pelletier (née Holbrook)
  - Brooklynn Prince as young Helena
- Ben Mendelsohn as Jacob Holbrook
- Gil Birmingham as Clark Bekkum
- Caren Pistorius as Beth
- Garrett Hedlund as Stephen Pelletier
- Joey Carson as Marigold Pelletier
- Yanna McIntosh as Agent Lorna Illing
- Lorne Cardinal as Sheriff

== Production ==
The project was announced in February 2018, with Elle Smith and Mark L. Smith writing the screenplay for director Morten Tyldum. Alicia Vikander was cast in the lead role, and was also set to serve as an executive producer.

Filming was due to begin in late July 2019, and continue through autumn, but no further developments were announced until February 2021, with Tyldum and Vikander no longer involved in the film. Neil Burger was now directing with Daisy Ridley cast to star, replacing Tyldum and Vikander. In May, Ben Mendelsohn joined the cast. In June 2021, Brooklynn Prince, Gil Birmingham, Caren Pistorius, and Garrett Hedlund joined the cast of the film.

Filming began on June 7, 2021, in Kent County and the Kawartha Lakes of Ontario, Canada. Filming officially ended on August 6, 2021.

=== Music ===
In April 2022, it was revealed that Adam Janota Bzowski composed the score for the film.

== Release ==
Initially meant to be released by STXfilms, the film's distribution was shopped to different distributors following the dissolution of STXfilms' domestic distribution company. STXfilms eventually formed a domestic distribution partnership with Lionsgate. Lionsgate and Roadside Attractions scheduled the film for release on October 6, 2023. It was later delayed to November 3, 2023, to avoid competition with Taylor Swift: The Eras Tour. Amazon Studios will distribute the film in European markets as part of ErosSTX's multi-year output deal with the company via Prime Video.

The Marsh King's Daughter was released on digital platforms on November 21, 2023, followed by a Blu-ray and DVD release on January 2, 2024.

== Reception ==
=== Critical response ===
On the review aggregator website Rotten Tomatoes, 41% of 46 critics' reviews are positive, with an average rating of 5.5/10. The website's consensus reads: "The Marsh King's Daughter begins with plenty of promise and has a remarkable cast, but they're outweighed by the story's dawdling pace and clumsy conclusion." Metacritic, which uses a weighted average, assigned the film a score of 47 out of 100, based on 14 critics, indicating "mixed or average" reviews.

Nell Minow of RogerEbert.com gave the film two and a half stars. He compared the film to Where The Crawdads Sing, and mentioned how "The Marsh King's Daughter struggles to evoke the lyricism of the language in the novel it is based on, despite exquisite images of the wetland settings." One reviewer criticized the film by highlighting its generic, mediocre plot, full of clichés, and its by-the-numbers approach to adapting a novel.
