= Burden (2018 film) =

2018 American drama film

- Film poster
- Directed by: Andrew Heckler
- Written by: Andrew Heckler
- Produced by: Robbie Brenner; Bill Kenwright
- Starring: Garrett Hedlund; Forest Whitaker; Andrea Riseborough; Tom Wilkinson; Usher
- Cinematography: Jeremy Rouse
- Edited by: Julie Monroe; Saar Klein
- Music by: Dickon Hinchliffe
- Production companies: Bill Kenwright Films; The Fyzz Facility; Unburdened Entertainment
- Distributed by: 101 Studios
- Release dates: January 21, 2018 (Sundance); February 28, 2020 (United States)
- Running time: 119 minutes
- Country: United States
- Language: English
- Box office: $450,189

Burden is a 2018 American drama film, inspired by true events. The film was produced by Robbie Brenner and Bill Kenwright, and was written and directed by Andrew Heckler. The film stars Garrett Hedlund, Forest Whitaker, Andrea Riseborough, Tom Wilkinson, Tess Harper, and Usher. The film premiered at the 2018 Sundance Film Festival and won the U.S. Dramatic Audience Award.

== Plot ==
The film follows Mike Burden, an orphan raised within the Ku Klux Klan in the town of Laurens, South Carolina. During the opening of the infamous Redneck Shop, Mike falls in love with a woman who urges him to leave so they can have a better life together. The Klan seeks Mike out for vengeance. A black Baptist church congregation, led by Reverend Kennedy, agrees to protect Mike, his girlfriend and her son.

== Cast ==
- Garrett Hedlund as Mike Burden
- Forest Whitaker as Reverend David Kennedy
- Andrea Riseborough as Judy
- Tom Wilkinson as Tom Griffin
- Usher as Clarence Brooks
- Crystal R. Fox as Janice Kennedy
- Dexter Darden as Kelvin Kennedy
- Austin Hébert as Clint
- Taylor Gregory as Franklin
- Tess Harper as Hazel Griffin
- Tian Richards as Grant
- Devin Bright as Duane Brooks
- Tia Hendricks as Toosie Brooks
- Joshua Burge as Ronny

== Production ==
Production of the film began October 20, 2016 and was set to wrap up on November 15, 2016.

== Critical response ==
Rotten Tomatoes reports a 50% approval rating based on 72 reviews, with an average score of 6.1/10. The website's critical consensus reads, "Burden grapples clumsily with its undeniably worthy themes, but its honorable intentions — and strong performances — make it easy to forgive those flaws." Metacritic gives the film a weighted average of 63/100 based on 6 critic reviews, indicating "generally favorable" reviews.

== See also ==
- List of black films of the 2010s
