= Karen Dionne =

American writer

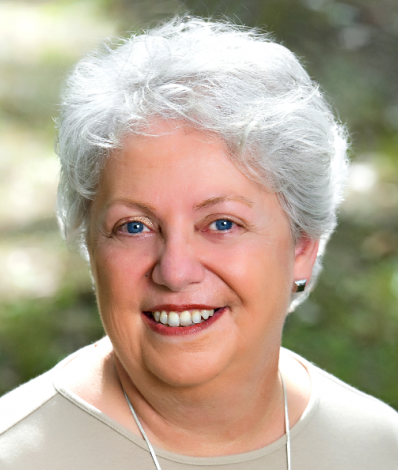
- Born: 1953 (age 72–73); Akron, Ohio, U.S.
- Education: University of Michigan
- Occupation: Writer
- Writing career
- Genre: Psychological thriller
- Notable works: The Marsh King's Daughter; The Wicked Sister
- Notable awards: Library Journal's Best Books of 2017; Suspense Magazine's Crimson Scribe Award (2017); Barry Award, Best Novel (2018)
- Website: www.karen-dionne.com

Karen Dionne (born 1953) is an American writer, whose internationally bestselling 2017 psychological suspense novel The Marsh King's Daughter was selected by Library Journal as one of the best thrillers of the year. The Marsh King's Daughter was recognized as the best book of 2017 by Suspense Magazine, which gave the book their "Crimson Scribe" award, the highest honor the magazine bestows. Translation rights have been sold in 25 languages. The 2023 film The Marsh King's Daughter directed by Neil Burger and starring Daisy Ridley, Ben Mendelsohn and Garrett Hedlund is a film adaptation of that book.

== Biography ==
Karen Dionne was born in 1953 in Akron, Ohio and moved to the Detroit area with her family at the age of eight. She graduated from Grosse Pointe North High School in 1971 and briefly attended the University of Michigan before dropping out to marry her artist husband. In 1974 they moved with their infant daughter to Michigan's Upper Peninsula as part of the back-to-the-land movement.

In 2004, Dionne co-founded the online writers organization Backspace. She reviewed for The New York Journal of Books and blogged at HuffPost.

Her publications include the novels Freezing Point (2008), Boiling Point (2011), and The Marsh King's Daughter (June 2017), and The Wicked Sister Her short story "Calling the Shots" was published in the anthology, First Thrills: High-Octane Stories from the Hottest Thriller Authors (2010).

Her environmental thriller Freezing Point was nominated by RT Book Reviews as Best First Mystery of 2008. The Killing: Uncommon Denominator was nominated for a Scribe Award in 2015 by the International Association of Media Tie-In Writers.

Dionne's 2020 novel The Wicked Sister was chosen by Publishers Weekly as one of the best thrillers of 2020.

Dionne's articles and essays have appeared in Writer's Digest, RT Book Reviews, and Writer's Digest Books.

== Awards ==
- 2018, Best Novel, for The Marsh King's Daughter
- 2021, Michigan Notable Books, for The Wicked Sister

== Bibliography ==
Novels

- Freezing Point (2008)
- Boiling Point (2011)
- The Killing: Uncommon Denominator (2014)
- The Marsh King's Daughter (2017)
- The Wicked Sister (2020)

Short fiction

- "Calling the Shots", in the anthology First Thrills: High-Octane Stories from the Hottest Thriller Authors, edited by Lee Child (2008)
