= Tracy Schorn =

American writer and cartoonist

Tracy Schorn (pronounced 'shorn') née Sutton is an American cartoonist, former journalist, book author, blogger known as "Chump Lady", and founder of the online community known as "Chump Nation", made up of survivors of infidelity. One reporter noted, "For cheaters, there's Ashley Madison. For the cheated upon, there's Tracy Schorn".

== Career ==
Schorn was the state news editor at the AARP Bulletin and has written for AARP, Smithsonian, and Reader's Digest. Her criticism of the term "conscious uncoupling" was noted by The New York Times.

Schorn has been forging a new narrative about infidelity that champions self-respect and self-care for those cheated on (so-called "chumps"). Schorn believes infidelity is abuse, and uses straight talk, snarky cartoons and humorous terms like "schmoopie" and "spackling" to affirm her motto "Leave a cheater, gain a life". Her own experience as a "chump" inspired her choice to focus on infidelity and the "reconciliation industrial complex" as her subject matter. She has written about therapists and their "dual accountability" fallacy ("What did you do to drive him into the arms of the other woman?"). She recommends acknowledging and learning from mistakes as part of coping with heartbreak. She says affair partners "need the triangle, the unwitting chump, to give their affair the frisson of danger".

Schorn advises cheated-on parents to remain respectful of their child's love for the cheating parent, but to give truthful, age-appropriate reasons for separation and divorce.

She advises the 'other woman' to confess to the cheated-on partner, arguing "the least you can do is return a little of their dignity and tell the truth".

Schorn's podcast with Sarah Gorrell is called "Tell Me How You're Mighty".

Tracy Schorn's blog, Chump Nation was credited in the acknowledgment of Liars, by Sarah Manguso

Schorn has blogged about both public figures glamorizing infidelity (e.g. Esther Perel) and public figures engaging in extramarital affairs (e.g. TJ Holmes and Amy Robach).

== Criticism ==
An article in The New Yorker described Schorn's philosophy as "a mission to reframe cheating as abuse". The Cut suggested that Schorn promotes unquestioning validation of women's assertions.

== Selected publications ==
- Leave a Cheater, Gain a Life: The Chump Lady's Survival Guide, Running Press, 2016. ISBN 9780762459056
- The Chump Lady Survival Guide to Infidelity: How to Regain Your Sanity After You've Been Cheated on, CreateSpace Independent Publishing, 2014. ISBN 9781493554003
