= Me and Tennessee =

Single by Tim McGraw and Gwyneth Paltrow

from the album Country Strong
- Released: February 22, 2011
- Genre: Country
- Length: 4:43
- Label: RCA Nashville
- Songwriter: Chris Martin
- Producers: Byron Gallimore; Tim McGraw; A. Martin

Tim McGraw singles chronology
"Felt Good on My Lips" (2010)	"Me and Tennessee" (2011)	"Better Than I Used to Be" (2011)

Gwyneth Paltrow singles chronology
"Forget You " (2010)	"Me and Tennessee " (2011)	"Landslide " (2011)

"Me and Tennessee" is a song written by Chris Martin and recorded by American country music artist Tim McGraw and actress Gwyneth Paltrow. It is included on the soundtrack to the film Country Strong (2010), in which the two star. It peaked at number 34 on the U.S. Billboard Hot Country Songs chart and at number 63 on the UK Singles chart.

== History ==
McGraw said that he had difficulty recording the song with Paltrow because he thought that "it's such a moving song" and said that he wanted to sing as well on it as she did. The song is the final cut on the Country Strong soundtrack. Paltrow's then-husband, Chris Martin of Coldplay, wrote it.

== Critical reception ==
Blake Boldt of Engine 145 gave the song a "thumbs down", calling the lyrics "hackneyed" and saying that the song "moves along without pause or purpose." Bobby Peacock of Roughstock was more positive, rating the song three-and-a-half stars out of five. He wrote that it was a "by-the-numbers breakup song, but the execution is where it shines", and praised both McGraw's and Paltrow's vocals and the "darker" sound.

== Chart performance ==
Chart (2011)	Peak position
US Hot Country Songs (Billboard)	34
UK Singles (Official Charts)	63
