= Redneck Shop =

White nationalist clothing store in Laurens, South Carolina

The Redneck Shop was a white nationalist and neo-Nazi clothing store and meeting hub in Laurens, South Carolina, which sold T-shirts, bumper stickers, and Ku Klux Klan robes, among other things.

The building also featured a "Klan Museum" in a back room. It was decorated with posters of President Warren G. Harding, whom some allege was a Klan member, though many historians refute this.

== Protests ==
In 1996, a white man from West Columbia, South Carolina, drove his van into the Redneck Shop as a protest against the store's racism. The building's current owner, the Rev. David Kennedy, said he later told the man that, while he obviously did not agree with store owner John Howard's views, he did not feel that violence was an appropriate response.

== Building ownership ==
The shop was located in a downtown Laurens building that formerly housed the Echo Theater, a formerly segregated movie theater which opened in the 1940s. The building is included in the Laurens Historic District. The building is currently owned by the Rev. David Kennedy, a black civil rights leader and Baptist pastor. The shop acquired a great deal of publicity due to this unusual arrangement.

The building was formerly owned by Michael Burden, who was himself a Grand Dragon in the Ku Klux Klan. However, Burden found himself impoverished after leaving the KKK. Burden then approached Kennedy and apologized for his racist past, agreeing to sell Kennedy the deed to the Redneck Shop with the provision that store owner, John Howard, would be allowed to run the shop until his death. Kennedy accepted the deal, although Howard tried to sell the building in 2006 without Kennedy's permission and eventually led to a lawsuit that Howard lost. Howard and his Redneck Shop were evicted in May 2012, and the building has since remained vacant.

== As a meeting place for white supremacists ==
In addition to selling merchandise, the Redneck Shop had also been used as a meeting place for white supremacists; in 2006, it was the headquarters for the Aryan Nations' World Congress. Also, in 2008, neo-Nazi John Taylor Bowles utilized the building as the headquarters for his 2008 presidential campaign.

== In popular culture ==
It was the basis for an American drama film, Burden, written and directed by Andrew Heckler. The film stars Forest Whitaker as Reverend Kennedy and Garrett Hedlund as 'Mike' Burden and premiered at the 2018 Sundance Film Festival.
