= Country Strong (song) =

Single by Gwyneth Paltrow

from the album Country Strong
- Released: August 23, 2010
- Recorded: 2010
- Genre: Country
- Length: 4:15
- Label: RCA Nashville
- Songwriters: Jennifer Hanson, Tony Martin, Mark Nesler
- Producer: Byron Gallimore

Gwyneth Paltrow singles chronology
"Bette Davis Eyes" (2000)	"Country Strong" (2010)	"Forget You" (2010)

"Country Strong" is a song written by Jennifer Hanson, Tony Martin and Mark Nesler. It was recorded by singer Britni Hoover in 2007 for her debut album under the same name. Then it was recorded again by actress Gwyneth Paltrow for the movie Country Strong in which Paltrow stars. Vince Gill and Patty Griffin also provide background vocals for the song. The song is included on the movie's soundtrack that was released on October 26, 2010.

The song was released to country music radio on August 23, 2010, and has reached the Top 30 of the Billboard Hot Country Songs chart. It has also been made into a music video, featuring scenes from the film.

== Critical reception ==
Kevin John Coyne, of Country Universe, gave the song a "B−" rating, stating that most country acts now are faking being country. Coyne also stated that "there's nothing substantively different about Paltrow's new single and all of the other 'country and proud of it' songs that are out there. If it was recorded by any other new female singer that didn't have an established public persona, it wouldn't even raise an eyebrow." Matt Bjorke of Roughstock gave the song a 3½ star rating, stating the song was the "surprise of the week". Bjorke stated the song may be over-produced but showcased Paltrow's strong voice. While comparing it to "The Weary Kind", a song from the film Crazy Heart, Bjorke said "Country Strong" isn't as compelling or engaging as "The Weary Kind", however, it does have a good chance to be a mainstream hit.

== Music video ==
A music video was filmed for the song. It features scenes from the film as well as a band performance. It was directed by Kristin Barlowe and Christopher Sims.

== Chart performance ==
Chart (2010–2011)	Peak position
US Billboard Hot 100	81
US Hot Country Songs (Billboard)	30

== Awards and nominations ==
Year	Association	Category	Result
2010	Las Vegas Film Critics Society Awards 2010	Best Song	Nominated
2010	Satellite Awards 2010	Best Original Song	Nominated
