= Country Strong =

- Theatrical release poster
- Directed by: Shana Feste
- Written by: Shana Feste
- Produced by: Tobey Maguire; Jenno Topping
- Starring: Gwyneth Paltrow; Tim McGraw; Garrett Hedlund; Leighton Meester
- Cinematography: John Bailey
- Edited by: Connor O'Neill
- Music by: Michael Brook
- Production company: Maguire Pictures
- Distributed by: Screen Gems (through Sony Pictures Releasing)
- Release dates: November 8, 2010 (Nashville); December 22, 2010 (United States)
- Running time: 117 minutes
- Country: United States
- Language: English
- Budget: $12–15 million
- Box office: $20.6 million

Country Strong is a 2010 American musical drama film starring Gwyneth Paltrow, Tim McGraw, Garrett Hedlund, and Leighton Meester. The film, about an emotionally unstable country music star who attempts to revive her faltering career, was directed and written by American filmmaker Shana Feste. It premiered in Nashville, Tennessee on November 8, 2010, and had a limited release in the United States on December 22, 2010, before expanding wide on January 7, 2011. This is the second film in which McGraw and Hedlund have worked together, the first being Friday Night Lights in 2004.

Country Strong was released theatrically on January 7, 2011 and received mixed reviews from critics. At the 83rd Academy Awards, the film was nominated for Best Original Song ("Coming Home").

== Plot ==
Beau Hutton sings with Kelly Canter, a recovering alcoholic country music singer going through rehab. He is clearly smitten by her, and it is later revealed that the two have been having an affair, even though Kelly is married to James. Kelly is checked out of rehab a month early by James, who wants her to go on a three-city tour to restore her image. She agrees on the condition that Beau becomes her opening act. James has already planned to see Chiles Stanton, a beauty queen with potential to become a rising singer, perform that night in hopes that she will be Kelly's opener instead.

On the night of Chiles' performance, Beau dismisses her as a "Country Barbie" and makes it clear he doesn't want her on the tour. As Chiles takes the stage, she struggles with stage fright and is unable to sing. In a moment of unexpected support, Beau steps in and begins to sing "Friends in Low Places". The two sing the song together, and it gives Chiles the courage to continue on her own. James is impressed by Beau's performance and offers the opening act to both of them. He suggests that Beau and Chiles could make quite the duo, but Beau disagrees. Nevertheless, Beau agrees to go on the tour because he cares about Kelly.

The first show is a disaster: before going on, Kelly receives an anonymous package containing a bloody baby doll with a note reading "Baby Killer," referring to the baby Kelly miscarried when she fell off the stage in Dallas during her last concert before she went into rehab. At that concert, she was five months pregnant and was found to have a blood alcohol level of 0.19 when she was in the hospital for the injuries related to the fall. Kelly falls apart, starts drinking, and almost refuses to go on. However, she is coerced into going on stage by James. She begins to sing "Country Strong" but breaks down on stage. She attempts to try another song, "A Fighter", but breaks down again and is led off stage by her husband, ending the show. They tell the media at a press conference that they had to cancel the show due to food poisoning and head off to the next show.

Beau ends his relationship with Kelly and begins to spend more time with Chiles, whose fame has been increasing as the tour progresses. Chiles and Beau form a bond and Beau lets go of his earlier hostilities towards her. She even finishes the chorus to his song "Give in to Me". Later, Beau confronts James about Kelly's worsening condition. James insists that Kelly may get better, and says that he can't let her go out with a failure. Beau disagrees and subtly admits their affair. Enraged, James punches him in the jaw.

Before the next show in Austin, Kelly is unable to go on stage after drinking. Despite this, Beau and Chiles go ahead with their opening act, performing "Give in to Me" for the first time together. JJ, Kelly's agent, nearly cancels the tour but is dissuaded by Kelly's offer of sex. Witnessing this, Beau becomes frustrated with Kelly. Later that night, Chiles and Beau have sex, and Beau confesses to Chiles that he likes her. In Dallas, Beau gives Chiles a pair of star-shaped earrings and asks her to move to California with him. Chiles immediately agrees, but then asks for more time to consider the offer.

The two perform and Kelly comes out, this time sober and ready, and performs her entire set for the first time; she performs "Country Strong", "Shake That Thing", and "Coming Home". After the concert, James and JJ immediately begin making plans for Kelly's future. That night, Kelly commits suicide by overdosing on prescription medication. She leaves a letter to Beau, echoing his earlier words that "Love and fame can't live in the same place." In the letter, she gives him the advice to choose "love". Beau takes her advice, and after Kelly's funeral, he moves to California.

Later on, Beau is singing in a bar in California, when Chiles walks in, wearing the earrings he gave her. They begin singing "Give in to Me" together.

== Cast ==
- Gwyneth Paltrow as Kelly Canter
- Tim McGraw as James Canter
- Garrett Hedlund as Beau Hutton
- Leighton Meester as Chiles Stanton
- Marshall Chapman as Winnie
- Lari White as Hair Stylist
- Jeremy Childs as J.J.
- Jim Lauderdale as Kelly's Bandmate
- Amanda Shires as Kelly's Bandmate
- Chris Scruggs as Beau's Bandmate

== Production ==
With a budget of $15 million, pre-production work on the project, then titled Love Don't Let Me Down, began in November 2009. Shana Feste was working as a nanny for Tobey Maguire, caring for his daughter, when she wrote the screenplay. She showed him her "work-in-progress" at his request and he agreed to co-produce the film. She had real country stars in mind when she wrote the script.

Garrett Hedlund took guitar lessons because he could not play the guitar nor sing before the film. He explained: "When I read the script and started playing guitar I knew I wanted to get there. I mean I wasn't going to have a hand double come in and be playing the chords, having to have two different setups just because I couldn't get it down." Gwyneth Paltrow also took guitar lessons. Paltrow stated she had trouble understanding her character's alcohol abuse and sought advice in playing the character from Marvel Cinematic Universe co-star Robert Downey Jr., who has suffered from addiction in the past. In interviews, Feste has said that American pop singer Britney Spears inspired Paltrow's character in the film.

Principal photography took place in Nashville, Tennessee. Locations used for the film include the Ryman Auditorium, the Union Station Hotel, Belle Meade Plantation, Mount Olivet Cemetery, the Fontanel Mansion, (Whites Creek, Tenn.) the Nashville Municipal Auditorium, and the Andrew Jackson Hall. Filming also took place in Liberty, Tennessee. The film was shot in 2010 from early January to the first week of March.

== Release ==
On December 14, 2010, the official screening took place at the Academy of Motion Picture Arts and Sciences in Beverly Hills, California. It was attended by the film's stars and included Tim McGraw, Gwyneth Paltrow, Leighton Meester, Garrett Hedlund, and many other stars of Hollywood and country music. In the United States, the film received a wide release on January 7, 2011.

The film was released on DVD/Blu-ray on April 12, 2011. The special features include the soundtrack, deleted scenes, music videos, extended performances, the original ending, as well as features about the cast, the songwriters, and the costumes.

== Reception ==
=== Box office ===
Country Strong had two weeks of limited release, where it grossed $137,239. It was released nationwide alongside Season of the Witch on January 7, 2011, and was projected to gross $5–6 million from 1,424 theaters in its opening weekend. The film went on to debut to $7.5 million, coming in sixth place that weekend. It went on to gross a worldwide total of $20.6 million, against its $15 million production budget.

=== Critical response ===
On Rotten Tomatoes the film has an approval rating of 22% based on 132 reviews, with an average rating of 4.7/10. The website's critical consensus reads: "The cast gives it their all, and Paltrow handles her songs with aplomb, but Country Strong's cliched, disjointed screenplay hits too many bum notes." On Metacritic the film has a weighted average score of 45 out of 100, based on 30 critics, indicating "mixed or average" reviews. Audiences surveyed by CinemaScore gave the film an average grade of "B" on an A+ to F scale.

=== Accolades ===
Award	Date of ceremony	Category	Recipient(s)	Result	Ref.
Academy Awards	February 27, 2011	Best Original Song	"Coming Home"; Tom Douglas, Hillary Lindsey and Troy Verges	Nominated	
Golden Globe Awards	January 16, 2011	Best Original Song	"Coming Home"	Nominated	
Satellite Awards	December 19, 2010	Best Original Song	"Country Strong"; Jennifer Hanson and Gwyneth Paltrow	Nominated	
Las Vegas Film Critics Society Awards 2010	December 16, 2010	Best Song	"Country Strong"	Nominated	
Denver Film Critics Society Awards 2010	January 21, 2011	Best Original Song	"Me and Tennessee"	Nominated	
Golden Reel Awards	February 20, 2011	Best Sound Editing: Music in a Musical Feature Film	Fernand Bos, Philip Tallman	Won	
Teen Choice Awards	August 7, 2011	Actress in a Drama	Leighton Meester	Nominated	
Academy of Country Music Awards	2010	Tex Ritter Film Award	Country Strong	Won	

== Music ==
The film's title track was recorded by Paltrow and released as a single to country radio on August 23, 2010. Country artist Sara Evans' single "A Little Bit Stronger", is featured on the film's soundtrack and was released as a single in September 2010 (which also served as a single for her sixth studio album, Stronger). Both singles were promoted by RCA Nashville. The soundtrack debuted at #16 on the Billboard Top Country Albums chart upon its release on October 26, 2010. Following the film's release in January 2011, the soundtrack rose to a new peak of #2 on that chart, as well as #6 on the all-genre Billboard 200 albums chart.

The film's score was composed by Michael Brook. "Coming Home" by Bob DiPiero, Tom Douglas, Lindsey, Troy Verges and performed by Gwyneth Paltrow was nominated for Best Original Song at the 68th Golden Globe Awards and 83rd Academy Awards, but it lost both to "You Haven't Seen The Last of Me" from Burlesque and "We Belong Together" from Toy Story 3, respectively.
