= Rock, Bell, and Steel Band =

Victorian Musician

The Rock, Bell, and Steel Band is a massive 19th century lithophone, the largest of several such instruments from the 19th century that are collectively known as the “Musical Stones of Skiddaw”.

Built by a local stonemason named Joseph Richardson (abt. 1792-1855), it took thirteen years to construct between 1827 and 1840. When completed, it was described by a London newspaper as being “the largest and most complete set of musical stones that was perhaps ever collected in this or any other country”. It consisted of about 60 stones ranging in length from eight feet down to three feet, and covered a range of at least five octaves. The stones sat in two tiers on a wooden elevation that was twelve feet in length, the lower tier being the white notes of a piano, and the upper tier being the semitones. They were rugged and un-shapely in appearance, but were said to have produced “the sweetest music, like the harp or organ or piano”.

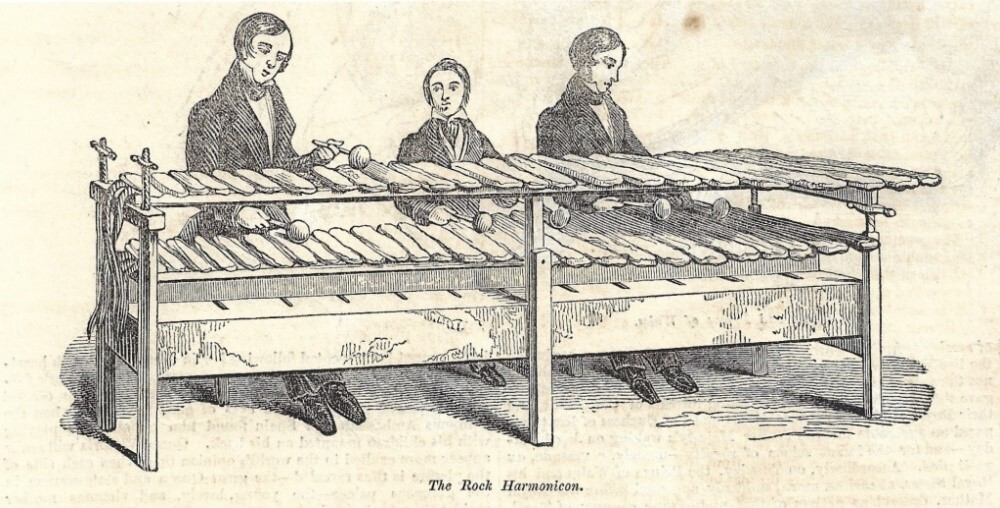
The "Rock Harmonicon", Illustrated London News, May 28th 1842, p.7.

The stones from which the lithophone was constructed were hornfels, a material that is only found in the Lake District within the inner aureole of the Skiddaw granite.

Known originally as the “Rock Harmonicon”, the instrument was performed upon by three players at once, the sons of the inventor, and they would sit in front in the same way as at a piano, with one playing the bass notes, the middle one playing the tenor notes, and the third playing the treble notes. The stone ‘keys’ were struck with oval-headed mallets of fir-wood, covered with chamois leather, with handles of over one foot in length.

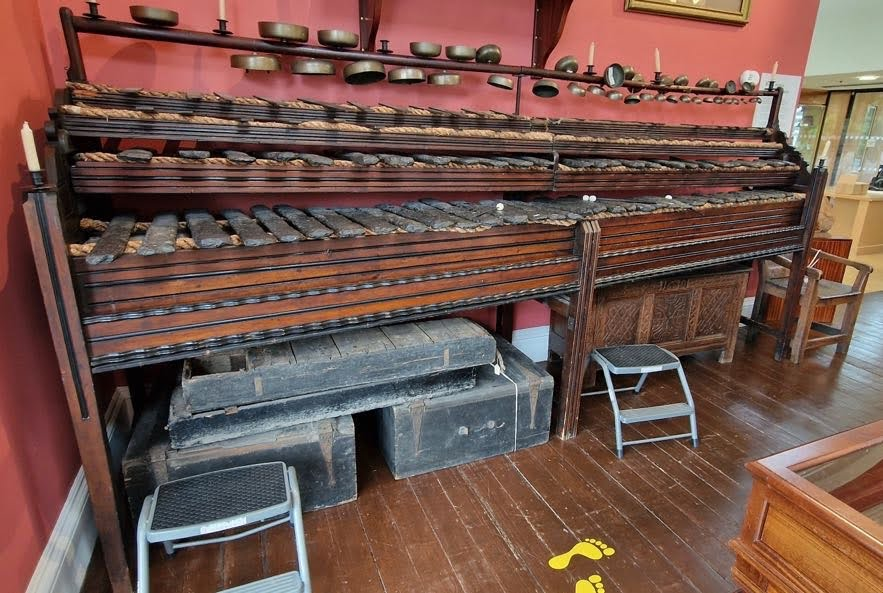
The "Rock, Bell, and Steel Band" in the Keswick Museum and Art Gallery

The band travelled the length and breadth of the British Isles between 1840 and 1852 performing at many of the largest concert halls in the country, as well as at numerous small villages. It even visited Paris, Brussels and Vienna on more than one occasion. Throughout the 1840s the instrument was considerable enlarged, with the addition of Chinese Steel bars and, later, Swiss Bells and pedal-operated bass drums. It then became known as the “Rock, Bell, and Steel Band”. On 23 February 1848, the Rock, Bell, and Steel Band received a Royal Command to perform at Buckingham Palace before Queen Victoria and Prince Albert, plus a large gathering of foreign royalty and dignitaries. It was gifted to the Keswick Museum and Art Gallery, Cumbria, i n 1917 by a grandson of the inventor, and it is one of the major attractions there. Visitors are encouraged to play on it with the special mallets provided.
