= Richardson Henderson =

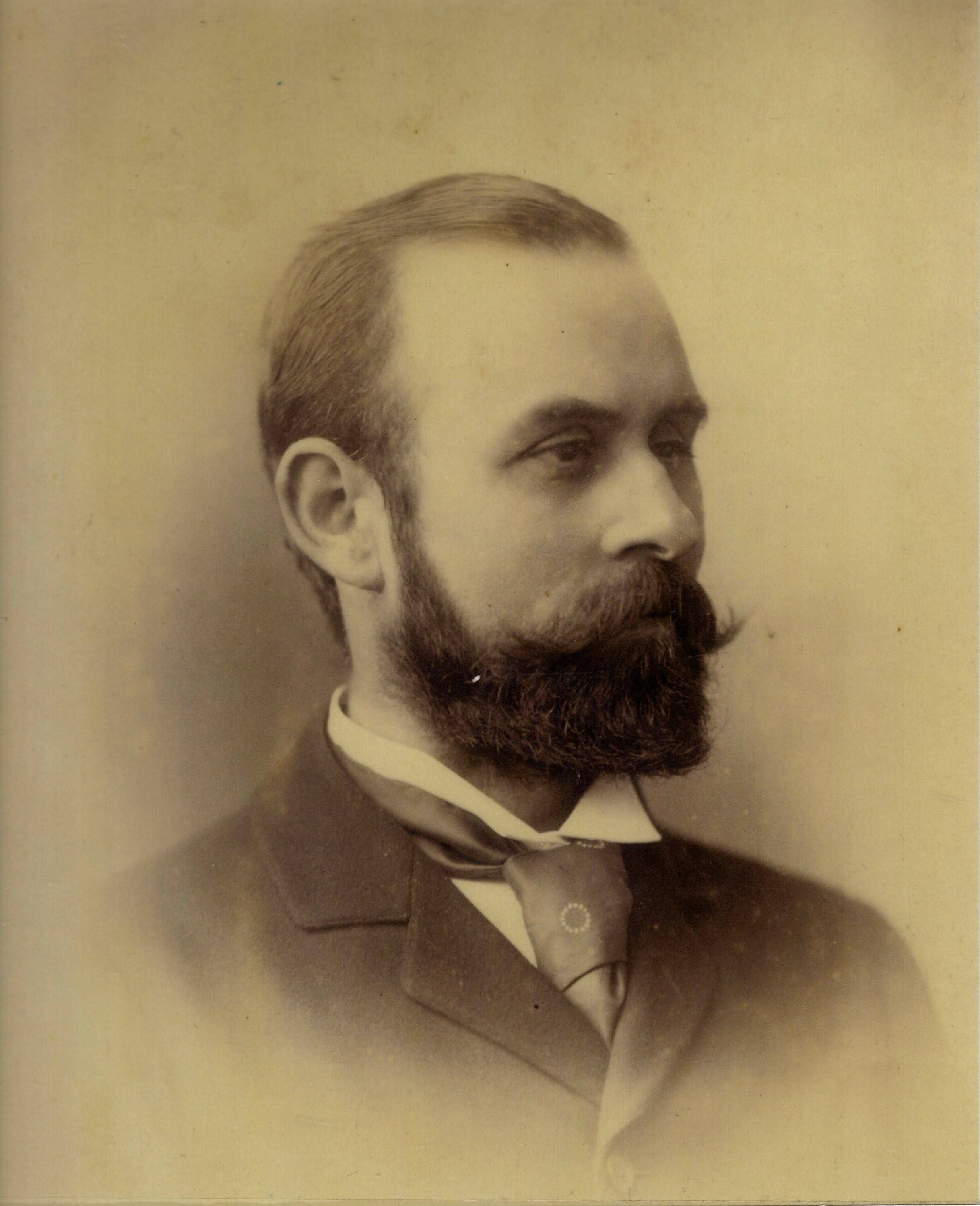
Richardson Henderson, taken at Henry Mayson Art Rooms and Lake Model Deport, Keswick

Richardson Henderson was a grandson of musician Joseph Richardson, who invented the Rock, Bell, and Steel Band from musical stones on the mountain of Skiddaw in Cumbria.

Born at Great Broughton near Cockermouth on 5 February 1855, he was the eleventh of fifteen children born to James Henderson and Ann Richardson, the eldest child of Joseph Richardson. He went to Brigham School at Great Broughton and was interested in music from an early age, going on to become a "Tuner and Teacher of Music" at his parents' house in Keswick after finishing his schooling.

After marrying Anne Haigh, a daughter of a wealthy colliery owner from Honley, Yorkshire, Henderson set up a music store in Keswick where he sold musical instruments and sheet music. Upon the death of his uncle, Samuel Richardson, in 1888, he inherited the instruments of the Rock, Bell, and Steel Band, the stones of which had been constructed of hornfels from Skiddaw. Samuel Richardson had been one of the three performers on the instrument between the years 1840 to 1852, when he toured with his father and two brothers up and down the length and breadth of the UK, as well as to several of the great musical capitals of Europe. They achieved great fame and even performed at Buckingham Palace before Queen Victoria and Prince Albert.

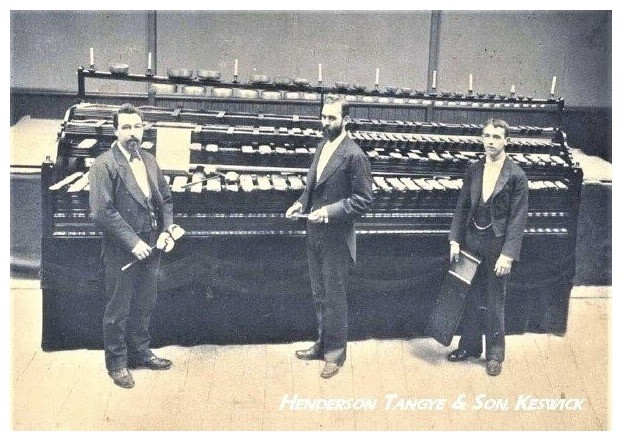
Henderson, Tangye & Son, Oddfellows’ Hall, Keswick, 16 July 1889

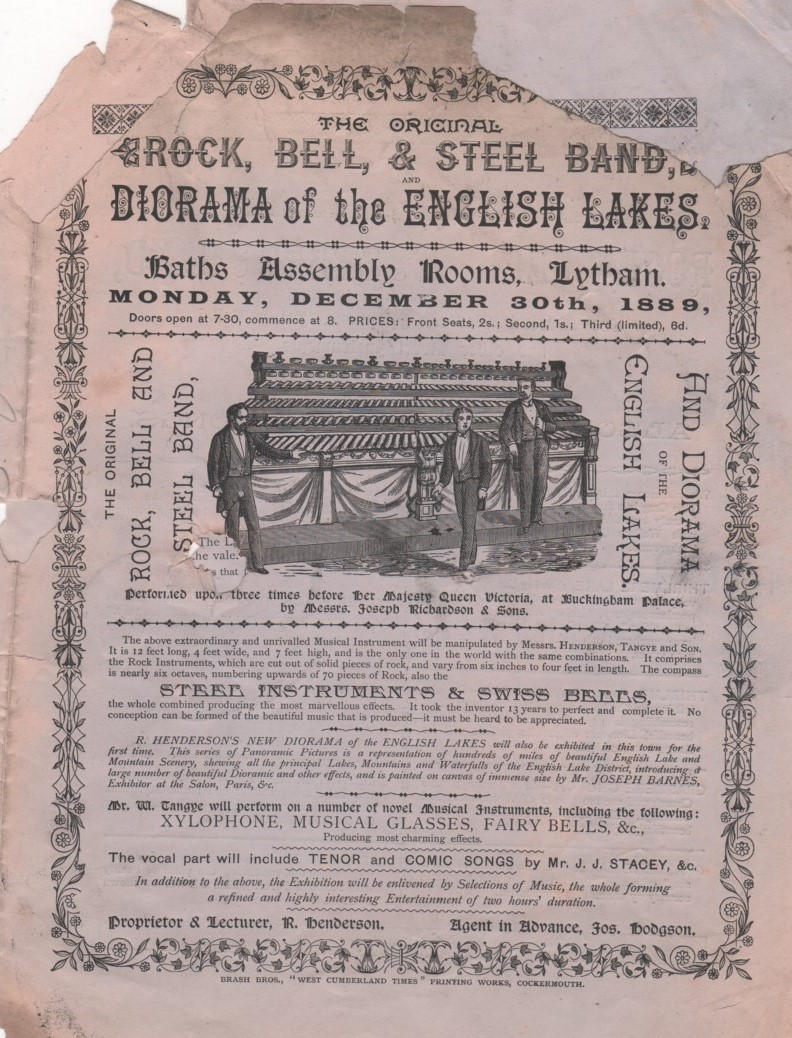
Programme for concert at the Athenaeum Lancaster, 19-21 December 1889

In 1889 Henderson tried to resurrect the former fortunes of the instrument and teamed up with a musical friend and his young son, known as Tangye and Son. They gave a concert at the Oddfellows' Hall, Keswick, on 16 July 1889, on the occasion of Henderson's youngest sister's wedding, and they were sufficiently encouraged by the response that, after a period of practice, they arranged to hold two further concerts, this time for the general public, at the Drill Hall in Southey Street, Keswick, on 7–8 November 1889. The English Lakes Visitor newspaper advertised the concerts the week before, reporting that:

"Mr. Richardson Henderson, who has become possessor of the original instrument known as the "Rock, Bell, and Steel Band," made and invented by his grandfather, the late Mr. Richardson, has determined to re-introduce it to public favour, and will be accompanied in a provincial tour by Messrs. Tangye and Son." "The Original Rock, Bell, and Steel Band and Diorama of the English Lakes, at the Drill Hall, Southey Street, Keswick, for two nights, Nov. 7th and 8th, at 8 o'clock."

The concerts were reasonably successful, and a further series of concerts was arranged almost immediately, to take place in the towns of Cockermouth, Workington, Maryport, Whitehaven, Carnforth, Lancaster, Fleetwood and Lytham St. Annes. Henderson commissioned a diorama of Lakeland scenes from a noted local artist, Joseph Barnes, and these formed a backdrop to the concerts.

However, the further concerts were not a success. A newspaper report after the Workington concert read:

"There was a wretchedly poor audience. Mr. Richardson Henderson is a gentleman who has sallied forth on a mission to unfold the artistic and musical beauties of Cumberland, and he practically opened his campaign against the ignorant in Workington on Tuesday evening. There was, in fact, a most wretched audience. This I may explain to Mr. Henderson is our usual method of putting our hall mark of merit on any entertainment".

The other concerts were not much less disastrous, and Henderson decided to cut his losses and abandon the entire project, at great personal expense. The Rock, Bell, and Steel Band instrument was then shut away in a back room of Henderson's shop. In 1917 Henderson moved with his wife to Scotland and he offered the Rock, Bell, and Steel Band to the Keswick Museum. It was Canon Hardwicke Rawnsley, one of the founders of the National Trust, who accepted the offer and received the donation on behalf of the museum trustees. It was reported at the time that:

"Mr. R. Henderson, Keswick, offered the trustees the set of five octaves of musical stones, collected by Richardson, of Keswick, early in last century. The offer was accepted."

Richardson Henderson died on Christmas Day 1930 at his son's house at Kingsway Penwortham, near Preston, Lancashire. His wife had predeceased him just sixty days earlier at Edinburgh, and they were both buried together in the churchyard at St. John's, Keswick, together with two infant daughters who they had lost many years earlier. The massive lithophone which he donated to the Keswick Museum and Art Gallery is still on display there today.
