= Alone Together Sessions =

Studio album by Hayes Carll
- Released: September 4, 2020
- Genre: Country
- Length: 41:33
- Label: Dualtone

Hayes Carll chronology
| What It Is (2019) | Alone Together Sessions (2020) | You Get It All (2021) |

Alone Together Sessions is the seventh studio album by American singer-songwriter Hayes Carll. Released on September 4, 2020, through Dualtone Records, the album features acoustic reworkings of songs from Carll’s previous releases, recorded during the COVID-19 pandemic. The album includes guest appearances by fellow musicians Ray Wylie Hubbard and Allison Moorer.

== Recording ==
Alone Together Sessions was recorded remotely during the COVID-19 pandemic, with Hayes Carll and producer/multi-instrumentalist Darrell Scott working separately from one another. Carll, based in his home, recorded his vocals and harmonica remotely, while Scott, located elsewhere, contributed instrumentation—including guitar, mandolin, bass, and drums—by sending files back and forth. The album’s creation was largely due to the unexpected break from touring because of the pandemic.

The album features new versions of ten songs from his past catalog, including earlier tracks like "Arkansas Blues" (originally released in 2002) and more recent songs like "Times Like These" (from 2019). Carll also included a cover of Lefty Frizzell's "That's the Way Love Goes," offering a reinterpretation of the classic song and featuring Allison Moorer.

== Release ==
Alone Together Sessions was released on September 4, 2020, on vinyl and CD. In addition to working on the album, Carll stayed connected with his fans through Alone Together Tuesdays, a livestream series he hosted from his home. The livestreams allowed Carll to perform and engage with fans while social distancing, during the isolation of the pandemic.

== Track listing ==
| No. | Title | Length |
|---|---|---|
| 1. | "Arkansas Blues" | 4:34 |
| 2. | "Drunken Poet's Dream (featuring Ray Wylie Hubbard)" | 4:54 |
| 3. | "Times Like These" | 3:21 |
| 4. | "Bad Liver and a Broken Heart" | 4:20 |
| 5. | "Down the Road Tonight" | 3:58 |
| 6. | "That's the Way Love Goes (featuring Allison Moorer)" | 3:11 |
| 7. | "KMAG YOYO" | 3:42 |
| 8. | "Bye Bye Baby" | 2:59 |
| 9. | "Sake of the Song" | 4:24 |
| 10. | "Beaumont" | 3:24 |
| 11. | "Wild as a Turkey" | 2:57 |

== Personnel ==
- Hayes Carll – primary artist, vocals, harmonica, acoustic guitar
- Ray Wylie Hubbard – featured artist, vocals
- Darrell Scott – guitar, vocals, mandolin, pedal steel, Weissenborn, upright bass, bass accordion, lap steel guitar, sitar (electric), baritone guitar, electric guitar, resonator guitar
- Allison Moorer – featured artist, vocals
- Luke Moeller – violin
