= KMAG =

KMAG can refer to:

- KMAG (FM), Arkansas country music station
- Korean Military Advisory Group, Korean War military unit
- Kmag (magazine), music magazine
- Keswick Museum and Art Gallery, English gallery
- kmag, a KDE magnifying tool
- Kevin Magnussen (K-Mag), Danish racing driver
- Langbeinite (K-Mag) a potassium magnesium sulfate mineral
- KPLO Magnetometer (KMAG), an instrument on the Korean lunar probe Danuri

== See also ==
- KMAG YOYO (album), a 2011 album by Hayes Caril
