= We're Only Human (album) =

We’re Only Human

Studio album by Hayes Carll
- Released: August 8, 2025
- Studio: Finishing School, Austin, TX
- Genre: Country
- Length: 41:45
- Label: 87 Records, Thirty Tigers

Hayes Carll chronology
You Get It All (2021)	We’re Only Human (2025)

We’re Only Human is the ninth studio album by American singer-songwriter Hayes Carll. It was released on August 8, 2025, through 87 Records and Thirty Tigers.

== Recording ==
Recording of We’re Only Human took place at Finishing School, a studio in Austin, Texas, originally owned by bassist George Reiff and later expanded by Gordy Quist following Reiff’s passing. Sessions began immediately after Patty Griffin completed work on her Crown of Roses album. Most of the album was recorded live, with exceptions for horns and pedal steel parts. David Jimenez, who happened to be at the studio to pick up an instrument, was invited to perform the solo on “May I Never.”

Carll often rewrote parts up until the start of each take. He recorded his first ever guitar solo on the track “High,” where his laughter after missing the final note is audible. The album was engineered and mixed by Jim Vollentine, who has worked with artists including Spoon, Patty Griffin, White Denim, Trail of Dead, Band of Heathens, Heartless Bastards, and Old 97’s.

== Release ==
The track “Progress Of Man (Bitcoin & Cattle)" was included in The Indy Review: New Music Friday on April 25, 2025. The title track “We're Only Human” was released as the lead single for the album on July 17, 2025. The full length album We're Only Human was released on CD and vinyl on August 8, 2025, as the follow up to 2021’s critically acclaimed You Get It All.

A music video for "Good People (Thank Me)" was released on Aug 8, 2025.

The album release was followed by a tour of the same name later in the year.

== Critical reception ==
We’re Only Human received widespread acclaim from music critics. NPR Music praised the album’s mix of humor and insight, calling it "full of rollicking and commentary-packed songs about the state of humanity in the modern world," and comparing Carll to songwriting greats like Lyle Lovett and Randy Newman.

Magnet Magazine highlighted its emotional depth, calling it Carll’s "most vulnerable and transparent to date," and "his best work." Holler described the record as "one of modern Americana’s genuine masterpieces." Country Standard Time called it "Carll’s most fully realized album to date," while Spectrum Culture noted the album "invites comparison—to Prine, to Dylan, to Isbell, to McMurtry—but Carll resists imitation," describing him as "flawed, funny, and deeply compassionate."

FolkAlley.com refers to Carll as a "a songwriter's songwriter." The article appreciates the storytelling and how the album appeals to the emotions of finding peace, hope and love. "We’re Only Human showcases once again Carll’s ability to connect introspective gems of wisdom with musical scores that reflect the depth of a song’s meaning. It’s one of the year’s best albums," says FolkAlley.com.

== Track listing ==
No.	Title	Length
1.	"We're Only Human"	5:02
2.	"Stay Here Awhile"	3:57
3.	"Progress of Man (Bitcoin & Cattle)"	4:05
4.	"High"	4:34
5.	"One Day"	4:02
6.	"What I Will Be"	3:18
7.	"Good People (Thank Me)"	3:43
8.	"I Got Away With It"	5:11
9.	"Making Amends"	3:04
10.	"May I Never"	4:49

== Personnel ==
- Hayes Carll – primary artist, producer, vocals, harmonica, acoustic guitar
- Gordy Quist – producer, engineer, guitars, vocals, background vocals, baritone guitar
- Jim Vollentine – mixing, engineer
- Chris Longwood – mastering
- Courtney Marie Andrews – album paintings
- Jeff Chenault – design
- Chris Tetzeli, David Bason, Callen Backs – management
- Brian Wright – guitars
- Jared Reynolds – bass, background vocals
- Mike Meadows – drums, percussion
- Trevor Nealon – keyboards
- Geoff Queen – pedal steel
- Noah Jeffries – mandolin, fiddle
- Sterling Steffen – clarinet, flute
- Wyatt Corder – trumpet, flugelhorn
- Paul Deemer – trombone
- Kelley Mickwee – background vocals
- Matt Tedder – guitars
- Aaron Raitiere – background vocals
- Ed Jurdi – vocals
- Shovels & Rope – vocals
- Darrell Scott – vocals
- Nicole Atkins – vocals
- Ray Wylie Hubbard – vocals
- David Jimenez – dobro
