= Lovers and Leavers =

Lovers and Leavers may refer to:

- Lovers & Leavers, a 2002 Finnish romantic drama film
- Lovers and Leavers (album), a 2016 album by Hayes Carll
