= Silex Piano =

Musical instrument of the lithophone family

The Silex Piano is a musical instrument of the Lithophone family. It was created by Honoré Baudre, circa 1885 and was described in several contemporary publications.

== Cassell's Magazine ==
According to Cassell's Family Magazine Illustrated, 1885:

It has long been known that certain flintstones emit a musical note when struck with other flints; and M. Baudre, a French musician, has constructed a piano on this principle. The flints are chosen according to their pitch when struck, and suspended horizontally by their two ends in a row like the keys of a Piano. An elegant metal framework supports the stones, and wires are used to suspend them. A sounding-board is placed a fraction of an inch below the row of stones. Tunes are played by means of two smaller flints held in the hands. The stone which emits the greatest tone weighs 4 1/2 lbs.; that which gives the corresponding half-tone weighs 9lbs. This large flint is immediately followed by one weighing 1oz. A 3oz. stone in the set gives the same as another weighing 6,000 grains; so that it is not alone the size of the stones, but other properties which affect the sounds.

== Scientific American ==
In 1866, a M. Baudry (sic) was described in Scientific American as having made a Flint Piano. As silex is the French word for flint, this would appear to be either the same instrument or a precursor of it. The article was taken from The Mechanics' Magazine at an unspecified earlier date.

A curious novelty has just been brought to London and is about to be exhibited to the public. It consists of a remarkable-looking piano, made of flints suspended from an iron frame, which are struck with a short flint to produce the notes. The flints are about, forty in number, and elongated, but of various lengths and thicknesses. They are arranged in the order of their tone, and the labor and investigation of years were required before the complete scale was formed.

The Star says that M. Baudry, the gentlemen who has made the instrument, was two years seeking for one particular stone, or tone—the terms being here almost synonymous. Two other tones were, after an almost endless investigation of flints, obtained from pieces of schist, the only exception to the flint tones which form the instrument. M. Baudry entertained some friends on Saturday afternoon last with a performance on this curious instrument, which was much admired, not only for its novelty, but also for its musical effect.

The tones are unlike those of any known instrument, as may be readily comprehended by any one who knows the ring of a piece of flint, and possess a sharpness that renders the performance peculiar, though by no means unpleasing. The flints are many of them very peculiar in form, and it would be a matter of no small difficulty to frame any coherent theory of the causes of the variety of tones observable, for they are by no means in the exact ratio of the size or weight of the different flints.

M. Baudry’s perseverance and skill in working out his ingenious idea have met with that success which he sought, and he deserves now to meet with a further success, which it is to be hoped will be awarded to him by the public.

While the Scientific American report uses "Baudry" throughout, there is a print by Poyet showing Honoré Baudre play his "geological piano", which has the stones held in a similar layout to a xylophone. This is offered for sale on the web and may be seen there.

== The Times ==
An 1875 article in The Times refers to an instrument which its inventor, Honoré Baudre, had been exhibiting "during the last 20 years, principally in the Paris neighbourhood". It was reported to contain 28 flint stones, exactly as they had been quarried from the chalk. There was another performance of the "geological piano" on January 7, 1876 at the "Royal Polytechnic", with entry charged at one shilling.

== See also ==
- Musical Stones of Skiddaw
