= Hayes Carll =

American singer-songwriter (born 1976)

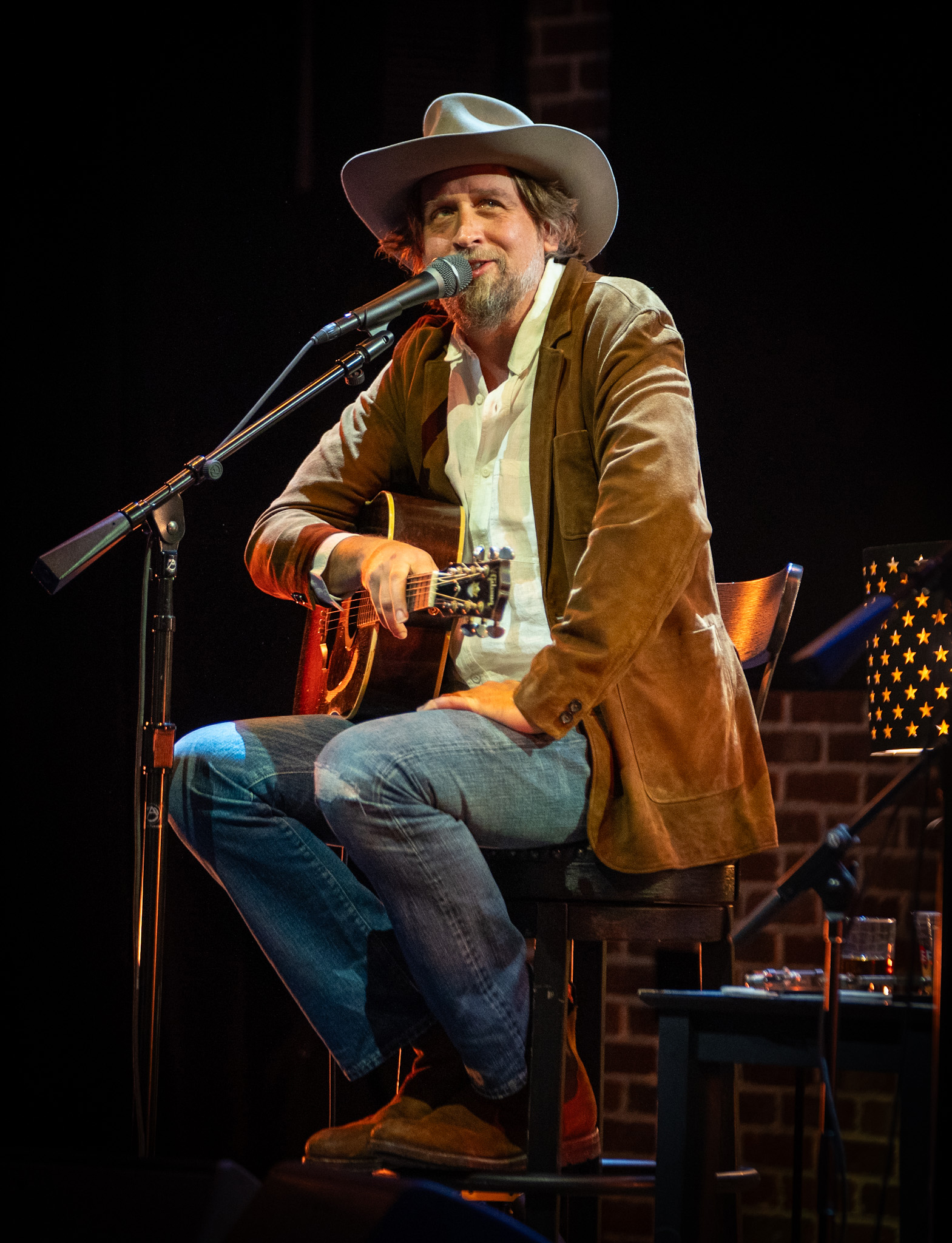
- Hayes Carll at Chief's on Broadway, in Nashville, TN, in 2025

Background information
- Born: Joshua Hayes Carll; January 9, 1976 (age 50)
- Origin: The Woodlands, Texas
- Genres: Texas country; Americana
- Occupation: Singer-songwriter
- Instruments: Vocals; guitar
- Years active: 2002–present
- Labels: Lost Highway; Compadre; Highway 87
- Spouse: Allison Moorer (m. 2019)
- Website: hayescarll.com

Joshua Hayes Carll (born January 9, 1976), known professionally as Hayes Carll, is an American singer-songwriter. A native of The Woodlands, Texas, his style of country, folk, and roots-oriented songwriting is noted for his plain-spoken poetry and sense of humor.

His songs have been covered by a wide range of artists, including Kenny Chesney, Hard Working Americans, Curtis Stigers, Lee Ann Womack, Corb Lund, Jack Ingram, Bruce Robison, Kelly Willis, and Brothers Osborne. He has appeared twice on the Austin City Limits TV show, and has performed on Jools Holland and The Tonight Show.

Hayes Carll has supported several charitable organizations over the years, including the Alzheimer’s Association, Guitars for Vets, the Health Alliance for Austin Musicians (HAAM), and the Second Harvest Food Bank.

== Career ==
=== 2000–2009 ===
Carll spent the early years of his career performing cover songs for tips in the bars of Crystal Beach, Texas, located on the Bolivar Peninsula. In 2000, he discovered The Old Quarter Acoustic Cafe in Galveston—a small yet prestigious venue run by Wrecks Bell, the longtime bassist for Townes Van Zandt. Carll began working as a bartender while also sharing his own songs, first at open mic nights and eventually as the opening act for touring artists like Ray Wylie Hubbard and the Sisters Morales.

In 2001, Carll independently recorded his debut album, Flowers & Liquor, at Willie Nelson's Pedernales Studio in Texas, with Lisa Morales serving as producer. After the album's release in 2002, Carll was voted Best New Act by the Houston Press and drew comparisons with other notable Texas songwriters.

Carll recorded his second album, Little Rock, in Nashville with producer R.S. Field. Alongside his manager at the time, Mike Crowley, he founded HWY 87 Records to release the album, which made history as the first self-released record to reach number one on the Americana Radio Chart. The track "Down The Road Tonight" also became a regional hit. Carll signed with Lost Highway Records in 2006 and released his next album, Trouble in Mind, in 2008. It was ranked No. 60 of the year by The Village Voice. "She Left Me For Jesus," which appeared on Trouble in Mind, was the Americana Music Association Song of the Year 2008.

In 2008, Carll founded the Stingaree Music Festival, a small music event held in Crystal Beach, Texas, named after a local restaurant where he used to wait tables. The festival ran for two years before being discontinued in 2010 following the devastation caused by Hurricane Ike.

=== 2010–2018 ===
Four songs by Carll appeared in the 2010 film Country Strong, three of which also appeared on the film's second soundtrack album, Country Strong: More Music from the Motion Picture.

KMAG YOYO & Other American Stories was released in 2011. KMAG YOYO is military slang for "Kiss my ass, guys, you're on your own." It received a nomination for Best Album by the Americana Music Association in 2011, and Spin voted it No. 3 in the category of "Best Country/Americana". American Songwriter voted the song "Another Like You" the No. 1 song of 2011, and the album No. 6. Rolling Stone ranked "KMAG YOYO" at No. 46 of best singles of 2011, and the album No. 47 on their list of "50 Country Albums Every Rock Fan Should Own." After KMAG's success, Carll left Lost Highway Records. In 2015 he went into the studio with producer Joe Henry to record Lovers and Leavers and then released the album in April 2016 on his own Highway 87 Records to great critical acclaim.

Carll was nominated for a Grammy Award in 2016, Best Country Song, for "Chances Are," which was covered by Lee Ann Womack.

=== 2019–present ===
In 2019, he released his sixth album, What It Is, on Dualtone Records.

In 2020, to stay connected during the Covid-19 pandemic, Carll launched a weekly livestream show, Alone Together Tuesdays. Over 68 episodes, he was often joined by Allison Moorer and his son, Elijah. Through fan contributions, he raised money for various charities.

He re-recorded many of his songs, including duets with Ray Wylie Hubbard and Allison Moorer, for 2020's Alone Together Sessions. The record was produced with Darrell Scott, and due to pandemic restrictions Carll recorded alone from his house while Scott recorded from his own. His album, You Get It All, was released on October 29, 2021, on Dualtone Records.

In 2024, Carll and Band of Heathens formed Hayes & The Heathens and released a self-titled record. The group also launched Everybody's Somebody Fest, a small annual music festival in Luckenbach, TX.

On April 23, 2025, Carll announced a new album We're Only Human which was released on August 8, 2025, followed by a tour of the same name later in the year.

Carll appeared on CBS Saturday Morning on August 23, 2025, playing "Stay Here Awhile", "What I Will Be", and "We're Only Human".

== Discography ==
=== Albums ===
Title	Date	Label	Peak chart position (U.S.)						Sales
Title	Date	Label	Country	US	Folk	Rock	Heat	Indie	Sales
Flowers & Liquor	June 11, 2002	Compadre Records	—	—	—	—	—	—	
Little Rock	March 8, 2005	Highway 87 Records	—	—	—	—	—	—	
Trouble in Mind	April 8, 2008	Lost Highway Records	—	—	—	—	11	—	
KMAG YOYO	February 15, 2011	Lost Highway Records	12	67	—	17	—	—	
Lovers and Leavers	April 8, 2016	Highway 87 Records	—	105	4	14	—	9	
What It Is	February 15, 2019	Dualtone Records	26	—	10	39	6	6	*US: 11,800
Alone Together Sessions	September 4, 2020	Dualtone Records	—	—	—	—	—	—	
You Get It All	October 29, 2021	Dualtone Records	—	—	14	—	—	—	
We're Only Human	August 8, 2025	HWY 87 Records/Thirty Tigers	—	—	—	—	—	—	
"—" denotes releases that did not chart

=== Music videos ===
Year	Video	Director	Producer
2008	"Crystal Beach Memories"	Collection Agency Films	Collection Agency Films
2008	"She Left Me For Jesus"	Collection Agency Films	Collection Agency Films
2011	"Another Like You" (ft. Cary Ann Hurst)	David Willis	David Willis
2013	"Bible on the Dash" (with Corb Lund)	Blake Judd	New West Records
2016	"The Magic Kid"	The Holden Brothers	Michael Lancaster
2019	"Times Like These"	Cody Ground	Arts + Labor
2019	"Help Me Remember"	Brandon M. Ward	The Frame Theory
2021	"Nice Things"	Becky Carman	CVWmedia
2025	"Good People (Thank Me)"	Eric Overstreet	Hayes Carll

== Music in film and television ==
Hayes Carll's music has been featured in a variety of film and television projects. Notable placements include:

- "Take Me Away" – featured in the film Country Strong (2011)
- "Hard Out Here" – featured in the film Country Strong (2011)
- "Hide Me" – featured in the film Country Strong (2011)
- "Turn Loose The Horses" – featured in the film Country Strong (2011)
- "Hide Me" – featured in True Blood, Season 4, Episode 6 (2011)
- "KMAG YOYO" – featured in Human Target, Season 2, Episode 10 (2011)
- "Stomp and Holler" – featured in Hart of Dixie, Season 1, Episode 4 (2011)
- "Stomp and Holler" – featured in Rectify, Season 3, Episode 2 (2015)
- "Don't Let Me Fall" – featured in Training Day, Season 1, Episode 11 (2017)
- "KMAG YOYO" – featured in The End of the F***ing World, Season 1, Episode 6 (2017)
- "KMAG YOYO" – featured in Love Island, Season 5, Episode 26 (2019)
- "Jesus and Elvis" – featured in The Ranch, Season 7, Episode 2 (2019)
- "Drunken Poet's Dream" – featured in Yellowstone, Season 3, Episode 5 (2020)
- "KMAG YOYO" – featured in Yellowstone, Season 3, Episode 6 (2020)
- "Drive" – featured in the film Hard Luck Love Song (2021)
- "To Keep From Being Found" – featured in Yellowstone, Season 4, Episode 10 (2022)
- "Happy Hour" – featured in Yellowstone, Season 5, Episode 1 (2022)
- "Beaumont" – featured in Walker, Season 3, Episode 18 (2023)
- "Down the Road Tonight" – featured in Yellowstone, Season 5, Episode 13 (2024)

== Awards and nominations ==
Grammy nomination for Best Country Song, 2016, for "Chances Are" (recorded by Lee Ann Womack)

Austin Music Awards

- Musician of the Year (2017)
- Album of the Year (2017)
- Song of the Year (2017)
- Songwriter of the Year (2017)
- Best Male Vocals (2017)
- Album Art (2017)
- Best Folk Performer (2017)

Americana Music Awards

- Song of the Year Award for "She Left Me For Jesus" (2008)
- Artist of the Year Nomination (2012)
- Song of the Year Nomination for "KMAG-YOYO" (2011)
- Artist of the Year Nomination (2011)
- Song of the Year Nomination for "Drunken Poets Dream" (2010)
- Emerging Artist of the Year Winner (2010)

SESAC Music Awards

- "Times Like These" (2019)
- "None'Ya" (2019)

Awards
Preceded by Darrell Scott	AMA Song of the Year (Songwriter); 2008 with Brian Keane	Succeeded by Julie Miller
