= Joseph Richardson (lithophone player) =

English stonemason and musician

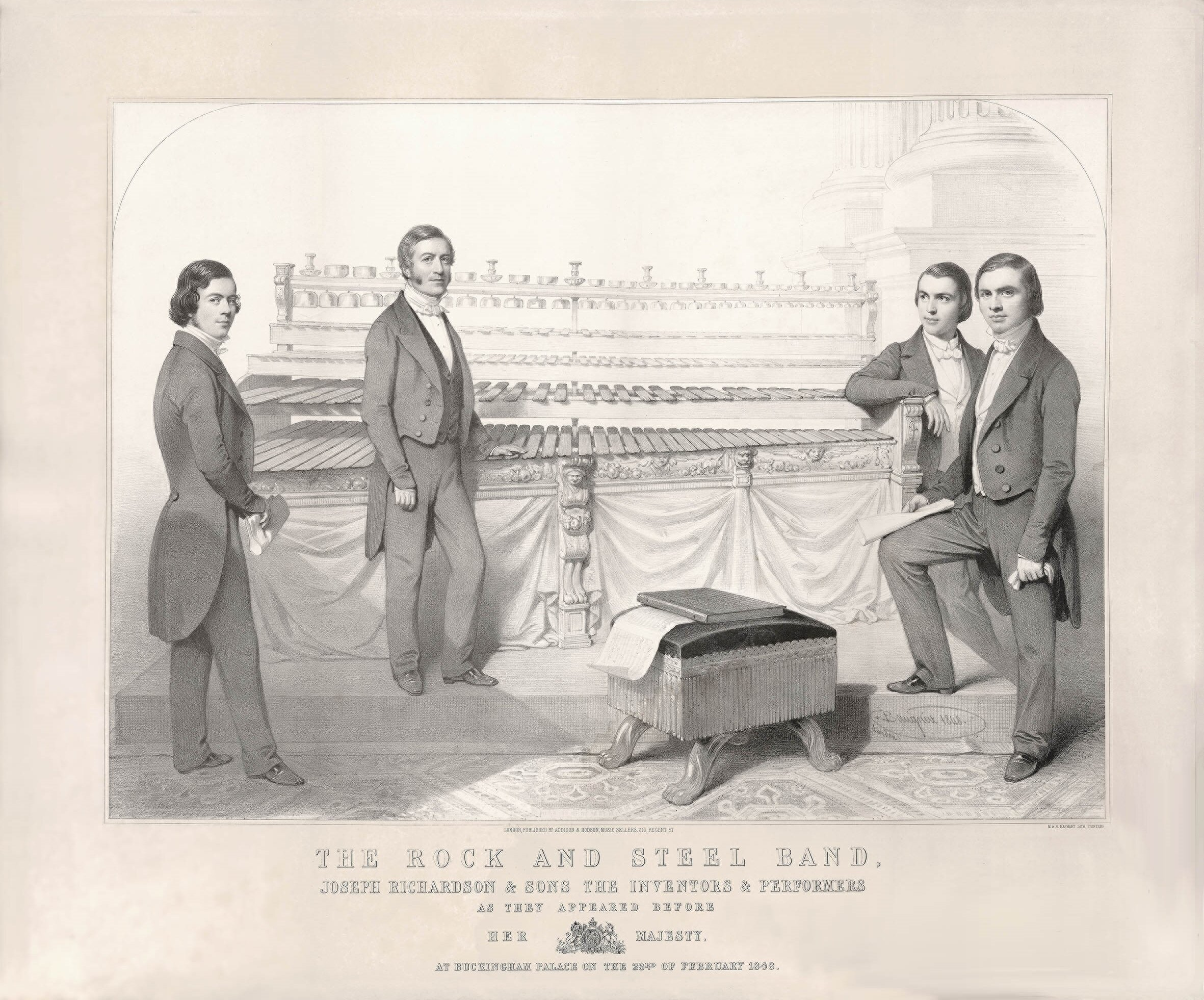
Joseph Richardson and Sons, as they appeared at Buckingham Palace on 23rd February 1848. Original engraving produced at the time of the performance.

Joseph Richardson (c. 1792 – 8 April 1855) was an English lithophone player.

== Biography ==
Richardson was born around 1792, in Cumberland, the eldest child of John Richardson (c. 1762-1839) and Dinah Williamson (c. 1768-1852). Joseph’s early years were spent in Keswick, where his father was a miller. The Richardsons owned the Low Corn Mill beside the River Greta.

Joseph married Elizabeth Culling at Great Crosthwaite on 23 June 1816. They lived at Applethwaite and had ten children, three dying in infancy. Joseph became a stone mason and spent thirteen years from 1827 to 1840 constructing a massive stone lithophone that he named ‘The Rock Harmonicon’ and taught his three younger sons to play. It was the largest of the 'Musical Stones of Skiddaw'.

In 1840, Joseph displayed the instrument at the Hutton Museum in Keswick. Many famous visitors came to the Lake District, including the Bishop of London, and word soon spread about the musical stones. Joseph was persuaded to take the instrument to Whitehaven for a three week trial, and after it received a positive reception, he performed in Liverpool and later at London's Royal Music Library. It was here that they came to the attention of prominent members of London's music scene, including composer and director Signor Michael Costa. who wrote several pieces of music for Richardson.

News of the Rock Harmonicon spread, and Richardson began a musical tour of towns in the south of the country, Ireland, and the European continent.

In February 1848, by which time they had been performing for eight years, the Richardsons received a Royal Command to perform at Buckingham Palace before Queen Victoria, Prince Albert and an enormous host of European royalty and dignitaries.[5]

Richardson began experimenting with adding other parts to his instrument, including Chinese steel bars, and Swiss bells. These led to the instrument becoming known as ‘The Rock, Bell, and Steel Band’. He later added pedal-operated bass drums.

Richardson planned a tour of the United States and Canada, but was unable to go after his agent went bankrupt. They continued to tour Europe until Richardson's youngest son fell ill.

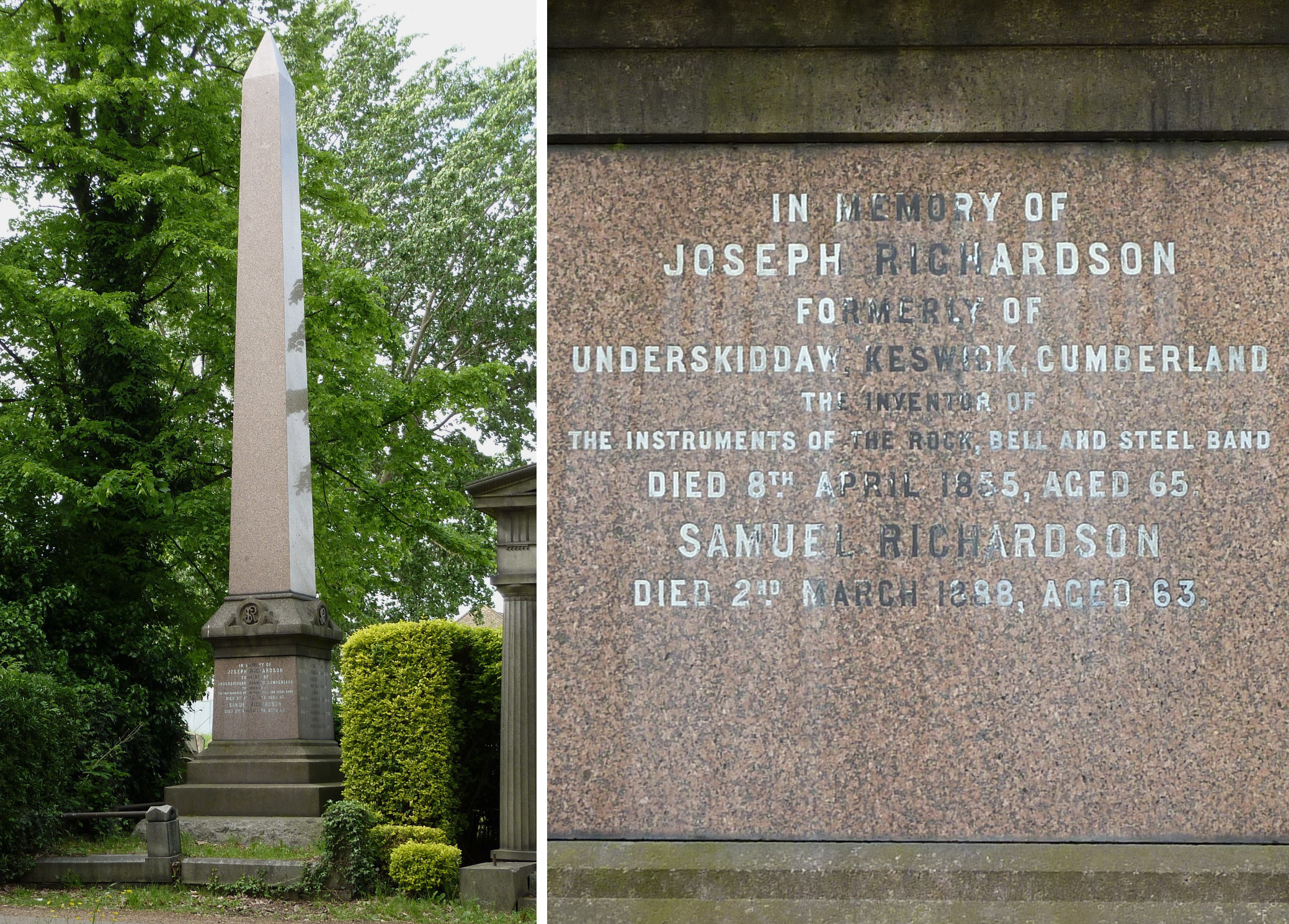
Richardson's funerary monument at Kensal Green Cemetery, London, in 2014, with detail of the inscription

Joseph Richardson died on 8 April 1855 at the ‘Green Man’.[7]

== Legacy ==
A lakeside performance by Brian Dewan and Jamie Barnes was part of the Coniston Water Festival. A special frame and sound box was constructed to mount the stones for the performance. Dewan used 35 of the 60 slate notes for his composition. These notes corresponding to the white notes on a piano. The performance was also broadcast on radio.

This performance was repeated at the University of Leeds in May 2006; new music was performed and recorded as part as the Liverpool Biennial 2006. For these performances the Stones were joined by a Chinese classical orchestra, and the bells of Liverpool Cathedral.

In January 2006, the Musical Stones reached a large national audience when they were featured as part of a BBC Radio 4 documentary on Cumbrian musical stones presented by classical percussionist Evelyn Glennie. This documentary was entitled "The World's First Rock Band". In June 2006, the Stones were featured on National Public Radio across America.

Keswick Museum and Art Gallery were also involved with a three-year project set up by Yorkshire Quarry Arts based at the University of Leeds. It was an interdisciplinary project to find out why hornfels has musical properties, carry out historical research on the Cumbrian sets of musical stones and organise a series of performances. The Musical Stones of Skiddaw were played in several events for Yorkshire Quarry Arts.

In 2007 and 2008, Keswick Museum and Art Gallery collaborated with the music charity Soundwave and Changeling Productions to produce a theatrical performance entitled 'The Musical Stonemason - A Cumbrian Wayang'. This show told the story of how the Musical Stones were discovered by Peter Crosthwaite and made famous by Joseph Richardson. The show was performed at the Royal Festival Hall, London and The Sage Gateshead in 2007 as well as several shows across Cumbria in 2008.

In 2017, a series of 'Monster Solid Rock Lithophone Concerts' by Gordon Pickering took place.[8]
