= Trouble in Mind (Hayes Carll album) =

Studio album by Hayes Carll
- Released: April 8, 2008 (US)
- Recorded: Alex the Great Studios, Nashville, Tennessee; Aerie Studio's, Austin, Texas
- Genre: Country
- Length: 50:40
- Label: Lost Highway
- Producer: Brad Jones

Hayes Carll chronology
Little Rock (2005)	Trouble in Mind (2008)	KMAG YOYO (2011)

Professional ratings
Review scores
Source	Rating
AllMusic	3.5/5 stars
PopMatters	7/10
Americana UK	–

Trouble in Mind is an album released by American singer Hayes Carll in 2008. The album debuted at number 18 of the Top Heatseekers chart.

== Track listing ==
Songs written by Hayes Carll unless otherwise stated.

1. "Drunken Poet's Dream" (Hayes Carll, Ray Wylie Hubbard) – 3:28
2. "It's a Shame" – 3:46
3. "Girl Downtown" – 3:27
4. "Bad Liver and a Broken Heart" (Scott Nolan) – 4:22
5. "Beaumont" – 3:26
6. "I Got a Gig" – 4:00
7. "Faulkner Street" – 3:25
8. "Wild as a Turkey" – 2:28
9. "Don't Let Me Fall" (Carll, Jonny Burke) – 3:45
10. "A Lover Like You" – 4:22
11. "I Don't Wanna Grow Up" (Tom Waits, Kathleen Brennan) – 3:36
12. "Knockin' Over Whiskeys" – 2:53
13. "Willing to Love Again" (Carll, Darrell Scott) – 3:26
14. "She Left Me for Jesus" (Carll, Brian Keane) – 4:02

== Personnel ==
- Hayes Carll – lead vocals, steel-string acoustic guitar, baritone acoustic guitar
- Al Perkins – pedal steel guitar, banjo, Dobro, lap steel guitar
- Brad Jones – bass guitar, vibraphone, electric guitar, baritone electric guitar, organ, piano, harmonium, nylon string acoustic guitar
- John Gardner – drums, percussion
- Pat Buchanan – electric guitar, acoustic guitar, harmonica, bass guitar
- Will Kimbrough – baritone electric guitar, banjo, electric guitar
- Fats Kaplin – Dobro, lap steel guitar, pedal steel guitar, violin, mandolin
- Brad Fordham – bass guitar
- George Bradfute – baritone electric guitar
- Lisa Pankratz – drums
- Thad Cockrell – background vocals
- Dan Baird – electric guitar, background vocals
- Carey Kotsionis – background vocals
- Carl Broemel – electric guitar
- Darrell Scott – Weisenborn slide guitar, background vocals
- Chris Carmichael – violin
- Robert Kearns – background vocals
