= Flowers & Liquor =

Flower & Liquor

Studio album by Hayes Carll
- Released: June 11, 2002
- Studio: Pedernales Studios in Pedernales, TX
- Genre: Country, Americana, Roots
- Length: 52:46
- Label: Highway 87, Compadre Records
- Producer: Lisa Morales

Hayes Carll chronology
Flower & Liquor (2002)	Little Rock (2005)

Flowers & Liquor is the debut album released by American singer-songwriter Hayes Carll.

== Track listing ==
Songs written by Hayes Carll except where noted.

1. Highway 87 – 3:10

2. Heaven Above – 3:52

3. Naked Checkers – 4:24

4. Arkansas Blues – 5:18

5. It's A Shame – 4:53

6. Live Free or Die (Bill Morrissey, Trigger Cook) – 3:09

7. Easy Come Easy Go – 5:51

8. Flowers & Liquor – 2:50

9. Richey Lee – 5:27

10. Perfect Lover – 4:02

11. Lost & Lonely – 4:55

12. Barrom Lament – 4:55

== Personnel ==
Adapted from AllMusic.

- Hayes Carll – lead vocals, rhythm guitar, acoustic rhythm guitar
- Rick Richards – Drums
- David Carroll – upright bass, bass
- David Spencer – Dobro, electric guitar, electric lead guitar, acoustic guitar, acoustic lead guitar, rhythm guitar, steel guitar, slide guitar, background vocals
- Bert Wills – acoustic lead guitar, electric guitar
- Lisa Morales – acoustic guitar, background vocals
- Michael Ramos – accordion
- Roberta Morales – background vocals
- Jeff Plankehorn – Dobro
