= Little Rock (album) =

Studio album by Hayes Carll
- Released: March 8, 2005
- Studio: Hum Depot in Nashville, TN with additional recording at Three Trees in Whites Creek, TN.
- Genre: Country, Americana, Roots
- Length: 40:11
- Label: Highway 87
- Producer: R.S. Field

Hayes Carll chronology
Flowers & Liquor (2002)	Little Rock (2005)	Trouble in Mind (2008)

Professional ratings
Review scores
Source	Rating
AllMusic	4/5 stars

Little Rock is the second studio album by American singer-songwriter Hayes Carll.

The album topped the Billboard Americana chart, the first self-released album to do so.

== Critical reception ==
The Austin Chronicle called the album "an Americana gem." Exclaim! wrote that it "shows yet another talented Texas troubadour bound for greatness." The Houston Press called it "wordy and witty enough to impress the Americana snobs, but plenty country enough for the dancehall crowd."

== Track listing ==
1. Wish I Hadn't Stayed So Long – 3:44
2. Take Me Away (John Evans and Adam Carroll) – 4:12
3. Down The Road Tonight – 3:38
4. Good Friends – 3:27
5. Hey Baby Where You Been – 2:59
6. Rivertown (Hayes Carll, Guy Clark) – 4:37
7. Little Rock – 3:05
8. Leave Here Standing – 2:40
9. Sit In With The Band (Hayes Carll, John Evans) – 2:31
10. Long Way Home – 4:46
11. Chickens (Hayes Carll, Ray Wylie Hubbard) – 4:32

== Personnel ==
- Hayes Carll – Acoustic guitar, vocals
- Kenny Vaughn – Electric guitar, acoustic guitar, National
- Jared Reynolds – Bass
- Jimmy Lester – Drums
- Allison Moorer – Vocals
- R.S. Field – Percussion, drums, Raka Raka guitar
- Bucky Baxter – Steel, backing vocals
- Adam Landry – Acoustic guitar
- George Bradfute – Bass
