= Sankarjang =

Archaeological site near Angul, India

Selected lithics from Sankarjang.

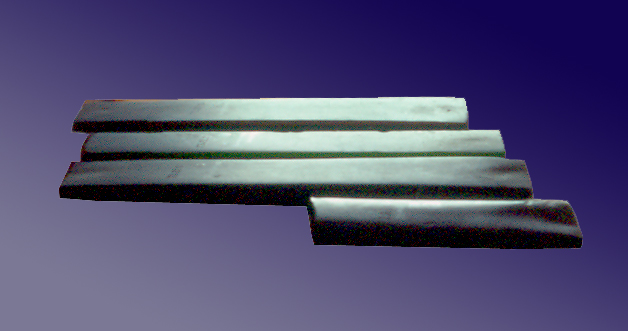
Sonorous stones from a lithophone

Sankarjang (20°52’08“N; 84°59’19“E), Odisha, India is an archaeological site near Angul, a former cemetery and settlement with large, worked stones but no one knows what they were made for, although some people think they might have been part of a lithophone . This site was test excavated by the State Archaeology Department of Odisha after a chance find of 20 long unfinished chipped and ground, lithic bars and axes of basalt, together with human skeletal remains and metallic artifacts, by a shepherd in 1971.

Archaeologists understood ground stone lithics to be typical of the Neolithic Period although they were in production later. The elegant lithics from Sankarjang resemble elaborate ones from eastern Asia and the South Seas. Such lithics played a key role in the definition of R. von Heine-Geldern's Austronesian culture. The incisor teeth of nine bodies interred in the graves had a "shovel" form which suggests Mongolian affinities. The absolute chronology rests on few 14C dates. Many of the stones give a resonance when struck and judging from the use-wear traces and shape, the stone bars appear to have belonged to finished and unfinished lithophones. Yule and Bemmann thus tentatively identified the stone bars as being part of South Asia's earliest known musical instrument.

== See also ==
- List of archaeological sites by country
- Paul Alan Yule
