= You Get It All =

Studio album by Hayes Carll
- Released: October 29, 2021
- Studio: Paste Studio, Nashville, TN
- Genre: Country
- Length: 43:32
- Label: Dualtone
- Producer: Kenny Greenberg; Allison Moorer

Hayes Carll chronology
What It Is (2019)	You Get It All (2021)

You Get It All is the eighth studio album by American musician Hayes Carll. It was released on October 29, 2021, through Dualtone Records.

== Release ==
You Get it All was released on October 29, 2021, on vinyl and CD. A deluxe edition of the album, featuring four additional tracks, was released digitally on September 30, 2022.

== Track listing ==
No.	Title	Length
1.	"Nice Things"	3:48
2.	"You Get It All"	3:08
3.	"Help Me Remember"	4:55
4.	"Any Other Way"	3:10
5.	"Different Boats"	5:22
6.	"In The Mean Time (featuring Brandy Clark)"	3:49
7.	"She'll Come Back To Me"	3:43
8.	"To Keep From Being Found"	3:15
9.	"Leave It All Behind"	4:11
10.	"The Way I Love You"	3:56
11.	"If It Was Up To Me"	4:15

== Personnel ==
- Hayes Carll – Guitar, Lead Vocals
- Kenny Greenberg – Guitar
- Fats Kaplan – Fiddle, Steel Guitar
- Fred Eltringham – Drums
- Brandy Clark – Backup Vocals
- Aaron Raitierre – Backup Vocals
