= What It Is (Hayes Carll album) =

Studio album by Hayes Carll
- Released: February 15, 2019
- Length: 38:36
- Label: Dualtone
- Producer: Allison Moorer; Brad Jones

Hayes Carll chronology
Lovers and Leavers (2016)	What It Is (2019)

What It Is is the sixth studio album by American musician Hayes Carll. It was released on February 15, 2019, through Dualtone Records.

== Critical reception ==
Professional ratings
Aggregate scores
Source	Rating
Metacritic	79/100
Review scores
Source	Rating
AllMusic	3.5/5 stars
American Songwriter	3.5/5 stars
Austin Chronicle	3.5/5 stars
Exclaim!	9/10
Rolling Stone	4/5 stars
Substack (Consumer Guide)	B+

What It Is has been given a Metacritic score of 79 based on 9 reviews, indicating generally favorable reviews.

== Commercial performance ==
The album has sold 11,800 copies in the United States as of March 2020.

== Track listing ==
No.	Title	Length
1.	"None'ya"	3:30
2.	"Times Like These"	2:59
3.	"Things You Don't Wanna Know"	3:12
4.	"If I May Be So Bold"	3:12
5.	"Jesus and Elvis"	3:22
6.	"American Dream"	4:00
7.	"Be There"	3:08
8.	"Beautiful Thing"	3:02
9.	"What It Is"	3:12
10.	"Fragile Men"	2:41
11.	"Wild Pointy Finger"	3:44
12.	"I Will Stay"	2:34
Total length:		38:36

== Charts ==
Chart	Peak position
UK Americana Albums (OCC)	39
US Digital Albums (Billboard)	24
US Folk Albums (Billboard)	10
US Top Album Sales (Billboard)	23
US Top Country Albums (Billboard)	26
US Independent Albums (Billboard)	6
US Top Rock Albums (Billboard)	39
