= KMAG YOYO =

KMAG YOYO (& other American Stories)

Studio album by Hayes Carll
- Released: February 15, 2011
- Recorded: Wire Recordings in Austin, TX except "Hard Out Here" recorded at Cedar Creek Recordings in Austin, TX. Additional recording at Alex The Great in Nashville, TN
- Genres: Americana, country
- Length: 41:59
- Label: Lost Highway Records
- Producers: Brad Jones, Scott Davis

Hayes Carll chronology
Trouble in Mind (2008)	KMAG YOYO (& other American Stories) (2011)	Lovers and Leavers (2016)

KMAG YOYO (& other American Stories) is the fourth studio album from American singer-songwriter Hayes Carll.

The album title is a military acronym for "Kiss My Ass Guys, You’re on Your Own". The album was included at no. 47 in Rolling Stone's "50 Country Albums Every Rock Fan Should Own". It reached no. 67 on the Billboard 200.

== Reception ==
PopMatters gave the album 6/10. American Songwriter gave it 4/5. Paste gave it a positive review, describing Carll's music as "simple songs that are simply grand". Allmusic gave it three and a half stars, calling it "a worthy addition to the ever-growing catalog of sly Texas country-rock". Rolling Stone gave it the same score, as did The Austin Chronicle. The Washington Post also gave it a favorable review, with Bill Friskics-Warren stating that on the album Carll is "setting some standards of his own". No Depression also viewed the album favorably, calling Carll "a sort of Charles Bukowski in the age of anti-depressants...a poet for thoughtful roughnecks and ne’er-do-wells". Entertainment Weekly gave it a B+ rating, as did The A.V. Club, and Robert Christgau. Exclaim! also gave it a positive review, calling Carll "the voice of a new generation of good ol' boys". New York Daily News gave it three stars out of five, Jim Farber calling Carll an "ace storyteller". The Independent's Nick Coleman called it "very good".

== Track listing ==
All songs written by Hayes Carll except where noted.

1. Stomp and Holler – 3:07
2. Hard Out Here – 3:32
3. Chances Are – 3:51
4. Grand Parade (Carll, John Evans) – 3:12
5. KMAG YOYO (Carll, Scott Davis, John Evans) – 4:19
6. Another Like You (featuring Cary Ann Hearst) – 3:19
7. The Letter – 3:24
8. Bye Bye Baby – 3:18
9. The Lovin' Cup – 3:56
10. Bottle In My Hand – 2:58
11. Grateful for Christmas – 3:54
12. Hide Me – 3:09

== Personnel ==
- Hayes Carll – Vocals, acoustic guitar
- Scott Davis – Electric guitar, acoustic guitar, baritone guitar, accordion, mandolin, background vocals
- Kenny Smith – Drums, percussion
- Ricky Ray Jackson – Pedal steel, electric guitar, banjo
- John Michael Schœpf – Bass, tenor guitar
- Brad Jones – Piano, stand up Bass
- Matt Mollica – Piano
- Bonnie Whitmore – Harmonies
- John Evans – Harmonies
- James Nixon – Background vocals
- Cary Ann Hearst – Vocals on "Another Like You"
- Corb Lund – Vocals on "Bottle in My Hand"
- Todd Snider – Vocals on "Bottle in My Hand"
