= Hornfels =

Group of metamorphic rocks

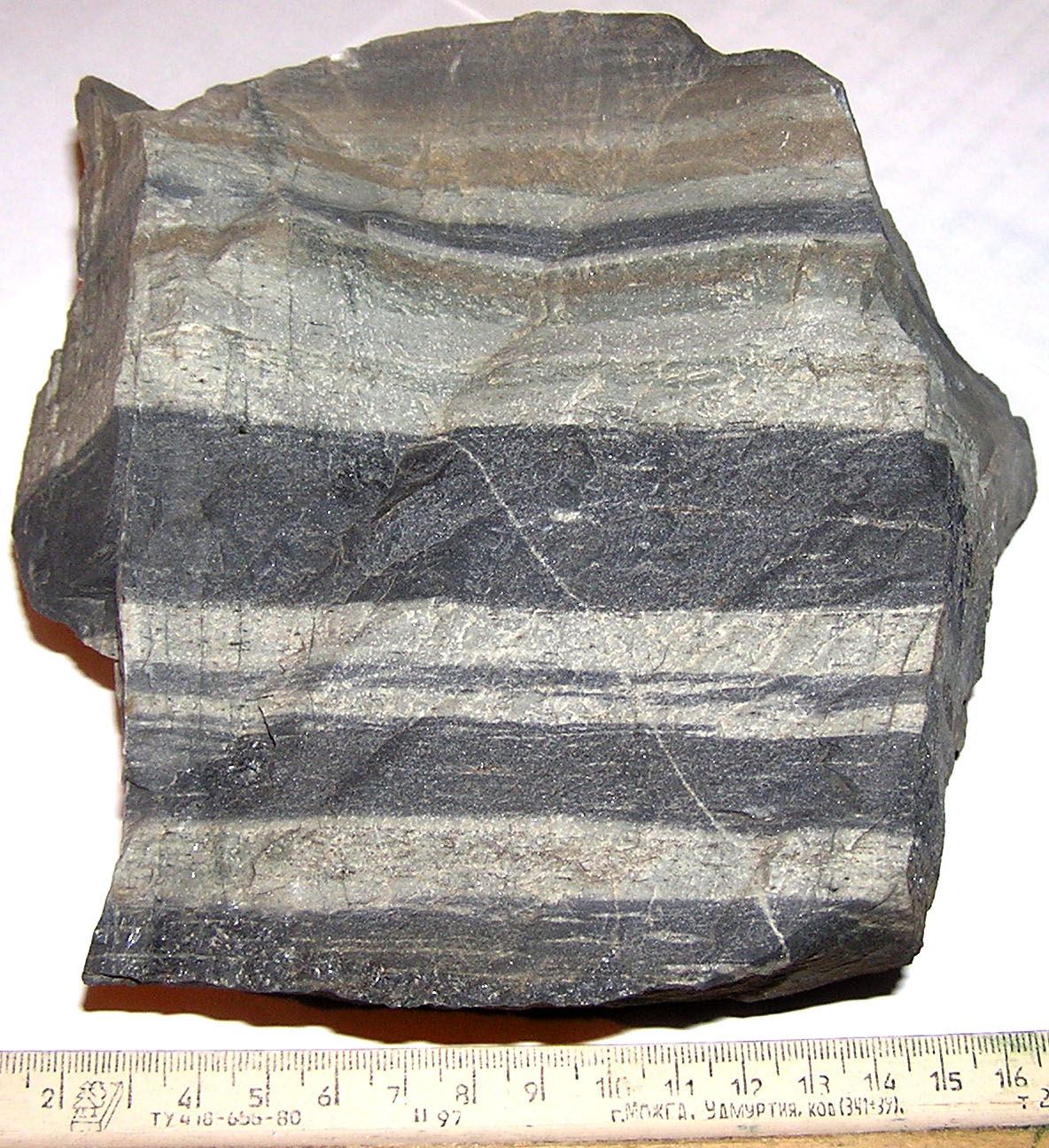
A sample of banded hornfels, formed by contact metamorphism of sandstones and shales by a granite intrusion

Hornfels is the group name for a set of contact metamorphic rocks that have been baked and hardened by the heat of intrusive igneous masses and have been rendered massive, hard, splintery, and in some cases exceedingly tough and durable. These properties are caused by fine grained non-aligned crystals with platy or prismatic habits, characteristic of metamorphism at high temperature but without accompanying deformation. The term is derived from the German word Hornfels, meaning "hornstone", because of its exceptional toughness and texture both reminiscent of animal horns. These rocks were referred to by miners in northern England as whetstones.

Most hornfels are fine-grained, and while the original rocks (such as sandstone, shale, slate and limestone) may have been more or less fissile owing to the presence of bedding or cleavage planes, this structure is effaced or rendered inoperative in the hornfels. Though many hornfels show vestiges of the original bedding, they break across this as readily as along it; in fact, they tend to separate into cubical fragments rather than into thin plates. Sheet minerals may be abundant but are aligned at random.

Hornfels most commonly form in the aureole of granitic intrusions in the upper or middle crust. Hornfels formed from contact metamorphism by volcanic activity very close to the surface can produce unusual and distinctive minerals. Changes in composition caused by fluids given off by the magmatic body (metasomatism) sometimes take place. The hornfels facies is the metamorphic facies which occupies the lowest pressure portion of the metamorphic pressure-temperature space.

The most common hornfels (the biotite hornfels) are dark-brown to black with a somewhat velvety luster owing to the abundance of small crystals of shining black mica. Also, most common hornfels have a black streak. The lime hornfels are often white, yellow, pale-green, brown and other colors. Green and dark-green are the prevalent tints of the hornfels produced by the alteration of igneous rocks. Although for the most part the constituent grains are too small to be determined by the unaided eye, there are often larger crystals (porphyroblasts) of cordierite, garnet or andalusite scattered through the fine matrix, and these may become very prominent on the weathered faces of the rock.

== Structure ==
The structure of the hornfels is very characteristic. Very rarely do any of the minerals show crystalline form, but the small grains fit closely together like the fragments of a mosaic; they are usually of nearly equal dimensions. This has been called pflaster or pavement structure from the resemblance to rough pavement work. Each mineral may also enclose particles of the others; in quartz, for example, small crystals of graphite, biotite, iron oxides, sillimanite or feldspar may appear in great numbers. Often the whole of the grains are rendered semi-opaque in this way. The minutest crystals may show traces of crystalline outlines; undoubtedly they are of new formation and have originated in situ. This leads us to believe that the whole rock has been recrystallized at a high temperature and in the solid state so that there was little freedom for the mineral molecules to build up well-individualized crystals. The regeneration of the rock has been sufficient to efface most of the original structures and to replace the former minerals more-or-less completely by new ones. But crystallization has been hampered by the solid condition of the mass and the new minerals are formless and have been unable to reject impurities, but have grown around them.

== Compositions ==
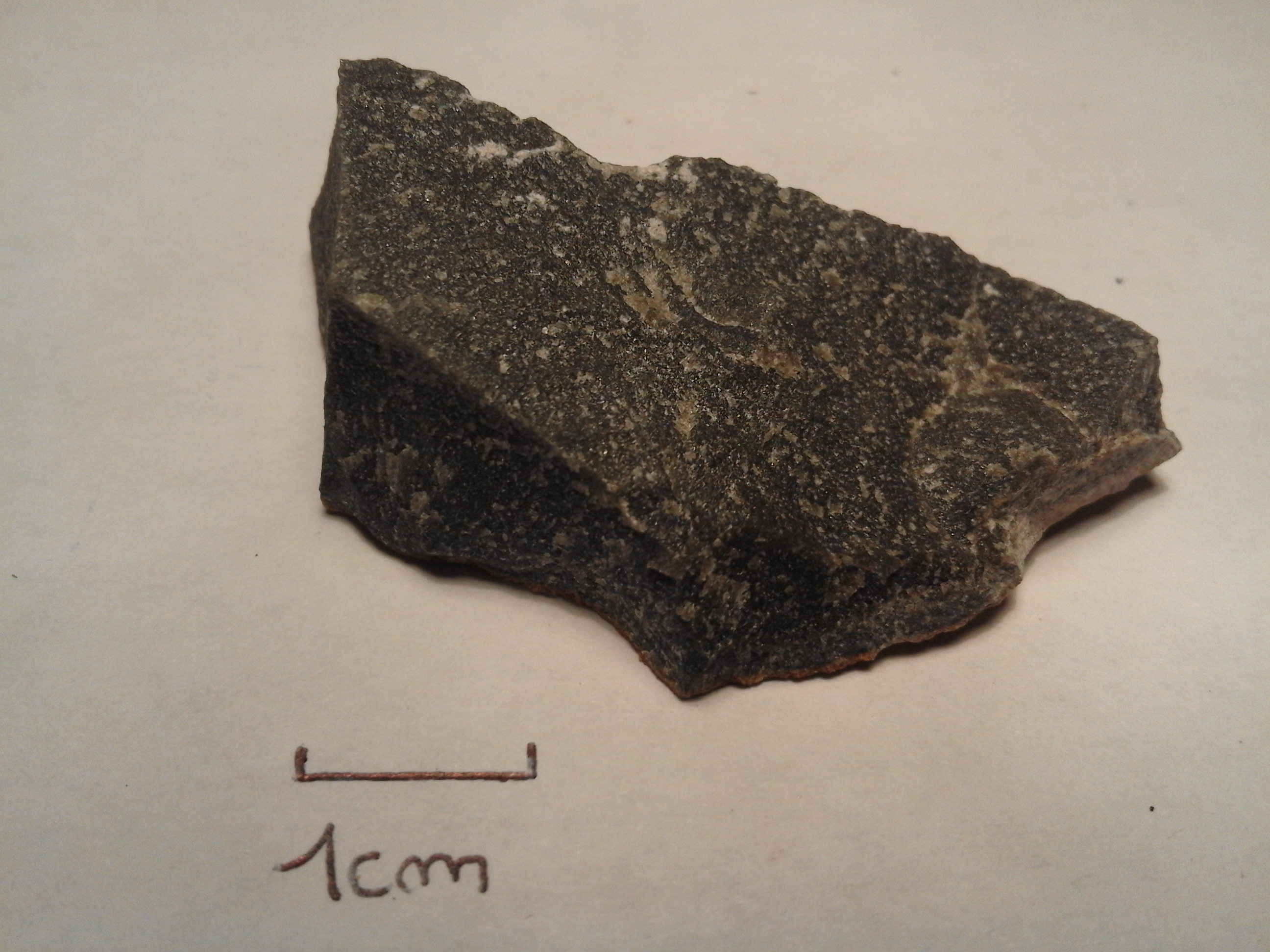
Hornfels sample (Normandy, France)

=== Pelitic ===
Clays, sedimentary slates and shales yield biotite hornfels in which the most conspicuous mineral is biotite mica, the small scales of which are transparent under the microscope and have a dark reddish-brown color and strong dichroism. There is also quartz, and often a considerable amount of feldspar, while graphite, tourmaline and iron oxides frequently occur in lesser quantity. In these biotite hornfels the minerals, which consist of aluminium silicates, are commonly found; they are usually andalusite and sillimanite, but kyanite appears also in hornfels, especially in those that have a schistose character. The andalusite may be pink and is then often pleochroic in thin sections, or it may be white with the cross-shaped dark enclosures of the matrix that are characteristic of chiastolite. Sillimanite usually forms exceedingly minute needles embedded in quartz.

In the rocks of this group cordierite also occurs, not rarely, and may have the outlines of imperfect hexagonal prisms that are divided up into six sectors when seen in polarized light. In biotite hornfels, a faint striping may indicate the original bedding of the unaltered rock and corresponds to small changes in the nature of the sediment deposited. More commonly there is a distinct spotting, visible on the surfaces of the hand specimens. The spots are round or elliptical, and may be paler or darker than the rest of the rock. In some cases they are rich in graphite or carbonaceous matter; in others they are full of brown mica; some spots consist of rather coarser grains of quartz than occur in the matrix. The frequency with which this feature reappears in the less altered slates and hornfels is rather remarkable, especially as it seems certain that the spots are not always of the same nature or origin. Tourmaline hornfels are found sometimes near the margins of tourmaline granites; they are black with small needles of schorl that under the microscope are dark brown and richly pleochroic. As the tourmaline contains boron, there must have been some permeation of vapors from the granite into the sediments. Rocks of this group are often seen in the Cornish tin-mining districts, especially near the lodes.

=== Carbonate ===
A second great group of hornfels are the calc–silicate hornfels that arise from the thermal alteration of impure limestone. The purer beds recrystallize as marbles, but where there has been originally an admixture of sand or clay lime-bearing silicates are formed, such as diopside, epidote, garnet, sphene, vesuvianite and scapolite; with these phlogopite, various feldspars, pyrites, quartz and actinolite often occur. These rocks are fine-grained, and though often banded, are tough and much harder than the original limestones. They are excessively variable in their mineralogical composition, and very often alternate in thin seams with biotite hornfels and indurated quartzites. When perfused with boric and fluoric vapors from the granite they may contain much axinite, fluorite and datolite, but the altiminous silicates are absent from these rocks.

=== Mafic ===
From diabases, basalts, andesites and other igneous rocks a third type of hornfels is produced. They consist essentially of feldspar with hornblende (generally of brown color) and pale pyroxene. Sphene, biotite and iron oxides are the other common constituents, but these rocks show much variety of composition and structure. Where the original mass was decomposed and contained calcite, zeolites, chlorite and other secondary minerals either in veins or in cavities, there are usually rounded areas or irregular streaks containing a suite of new minerals, which may resemble those of the calcium-silicate hornfelses above described. The original porphyritic, fluidal, vesicular or fragmental structures of the igneous rock are clearly visible in the less advanced stages of hornfelsing, but become less evident as the alteration progresses.

In some districts hornfelsed rocks occur that have acquired a schistose structure through shearing, and these form transitions to schists and gneisses that contain the same minerals as the hornfels, but have a schistose instead of a hornfels structure. Among these may be mentioned cordierite and sillimanite gneisses, andalusite and kyanite mica-schists, and those schistose calcite-silicate rocks that are known as cipolins. That these are sediments that have undergone thermal alteration is generally admitted, but the exact conditions under which they were formed are not always clear. The essential features of hornfelsing are ascribed to the action of heat, pressure and permeating vapors, regenerating a rock mass without the production of fusion (at least on a large scale). It has been argued, however, that often there is extensive chemical change owing to the introduction of matter from the granite into the rocks surrounding it. The formation of new feldspar in the hornfelses is pointed out as evidence of this. While this felspathization may have occurred in a few localities, it seems conspicuously absent from others. Most authorities at the present time regard the changes as being purely of a physical and not of a chemical nature.

== Facies ==

Metamorphic facies in pressure-temperature space. The various hornfels facies occupy the low pressure region of the space.

The hornfels facies occupies the portion of the metamorphic pressure-temperature space of lowest pressure and low to high temperature. It is subdivided into a low-temperature regime of albite-epidote hornfels, a medium-temperature regime of hornblende hornfels, a high-temperature regime of pyroxene hornfels, and an ultra-high-temperature sanidinite regime. The latter is sometimes regarded as a separate facies. Maximum pressures are around 2,000 bar and temperatures are around 300–500 °C for the albite-epidote hornfels facies, 500–650 °C for the hornblende hornfels facies, 650–800 °C for the pyroxene hornfels facies, and above 800 °C for the sanidinite facies.

The actual minerals present in each facies depends on the composition of the protolith. For a mafic protolith, the albite-epidote hornfels facies is characterized by albite and epidote or zoisite with minor actinolite and chlorite. This gives way to hornblende, plagioclase, pyroxene, and garnet in the hornblende hornfels facies, which in turn gives way to orthopyroxene, augite, plagioclase, and characteristic trace garnet in the pyroxene hornfels facies and sanidinite facies, the latter two being indistinguishable for this composition of protolith.

For an ultramafic protolith, the albite-epidote facies is characterized by serpentine, talc, tremolite, and chlorite, giving way to forsterite, orthopyroxene, hornblende, chlorite, and characteristic minor aluminum spinel and magnetite in the hornblende facies, which in turn gives way to forsterite, orthopyroxene, augite, plagioclase, and aluminum spinel in the pyroxene hornfels facies. The sanidinite facies for this composition differs from the pyroxene hornfels facies only in the disappearance of aluminum spinel.

For a pelitic protolith, the sequence is quartz, plagioclase, muscovite, chlorite, and cordierite in the albite-epidote facies; quartz, plagioclase, muscovite, biotite, cordierite, and andalusite in the hornblende hornfels facies; and quartz, plagioclase, orthoclase, andalusite, sillimanite, cordierite, and orthopyroxene in the pyroxene hornfels facies. The sanidinite facies features quartz, plagioclase, sillimanite, cordierite, orthopyroxene, sapphirine, and aluminum spinel.

For a calcareous protolith, the sequence is calcite, dolomite, quartz, tremolite, talc, and forsterite for the albite-epidote hornfels facies; calcite, dolomite, quartz, tremolite, diopside, and forsterite for the hornblende hornfels facies; calcite, quartz, diposide, forsterite, and wollastonite for the pyroxene hornfels facies; and calcite, quartz, diopside, forsterite, wollastonite, monticellite, and akermanite for the sanidinite facies.

== Acoustic properties ==
Hornfels have the ability to resonate when struck. Michael Tellinger had described these stones in South Africa also known as "ring-stones" due to their ability to ring like a bell. The Musical Stones of Skiddaw are an example of a lithophone made from hornfels.

== See also ==
- List of rock types
