= Lovers and Leavers (album) =

Studio album by Hayes Carll
- Released: April 8, 2016
- Recorded: Stampede Origin in Culver City, CA
- Length: 38:10
- Label: Highway 87, Thirty Tigers
- Producer: Joe Henry

Hayes Carll chronology
KMAG YOYO (2011)	Lovers and Leavers (2016)	What It Is (2019)

Professional ratings
Review scores
Source	Rating
AllMusic	4/5 stars
The Austin Chronicle	3/5 stars
Exclaim!	5/10

Lovers and Leavers is the fifth studio album by American singer-songwriter Hayes Carll.

== Critical reception ==
Exclaim! wrote that "the songs themselves are generally uninspired, and often feel unfinished despite being co-written, almost all of them, with top-notch songwriters." Relix wrote that Carll's "hard-bitten tales bring favorable comparisons to Townes Van Zandt, Guy Clark and Kris Kristofferson."

== Track listing ==
1. Drive (Hayes Carll, Jim Lauderdale) – 3:19
2. Sake of the Song (Carll, Darrell Scott) – 4:44
3. Good While It Lasted (Carll, Will Hoge) – 3:14
4. You Leave Alone (Carll, Scott Nolan) – 4:01
5. My Friends (Carll, David Beck, Paul Cauthen) – 3:52
6. The Love That We Need (Carll, Jack Ingram, Allison Moorer) – 4:08
7. Love Don't Let Me Down (Carll, Scott) – 3:16
8. The Magic Kid (Carll, Scott) – 4:08
9. Love Is So Easy (Carll, Ruston Kelly) – 3:04
10. Jealous Moon (Carll, J.D. Souther) – 4:24

== Personnel ==
- Hayes Carll – Vocals, acoustic guitar
- Jay Bellerose – Drums, percussion
- Tyler Chester – Piano, organ, and Wurlitzer
- Eric Heywood – Pedal steel
- David Piltch – Electric bass, upright bass
