= Musical Stones of Skiddaw =

Lithophones in Northern England

The Musical Stones of Skiddaw are a number of lithophones built across two centuries around the town of Keswick, northern England, using hornfels, a stone from the nearby Skiddaw mountain, which is said to have a superior tone and longer ring than the more commonly used slate.

The first documented lithophone from Keswick was built in 1785 by Peter Crosthwaite, an eccentric inventor who became interested in the musical properties of the local stone. However, this kind of instrument became widely known only decades later, when in 1840 Joseph Richardson, a local stonemason and self-taught musician, built a larger, eight-octave lithophone with which he and his sons toured the UK and Europe giving numerous concerts, including one in London for Queen Victoria.

Richardson's lithophone initially featured 61 tuned and shaped hornfels rocks. It was later enhanced with steel bars, Swiss bells, and various other percussions, and survives to this day, being on display at the Keswick Museum and Art Gallery.

The matter of exactly where Joseph Richardson sourced the stones for his lithophone has been given some considerable attention in recent years, thanks to the efforts of Dr. Alan Smith and Professor Bruce Yardley from the School of Earth and Environment at the University of Leeds.

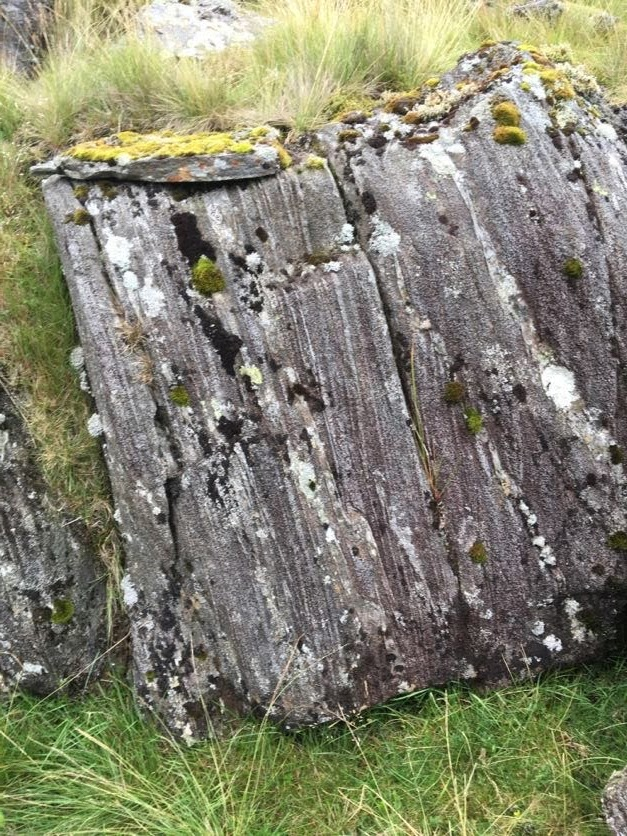
An outcrop of hornfels at Sinen Gill

The few references to the source of the stones are vague and contradictory. The stones, not only for the Richardson set but also for the Crosthwaite and Greenip sets, as well as further sets that were collected later, are all hornfels, a material that is only found in the Lake District within the inner aureole of the Skiddaw granite, and this narrows the area from where they could have come. The makes a comment by Peter Crosthwaite in his journal of 10 June 1785 very confusing, as the River Greta does not fall within this area.

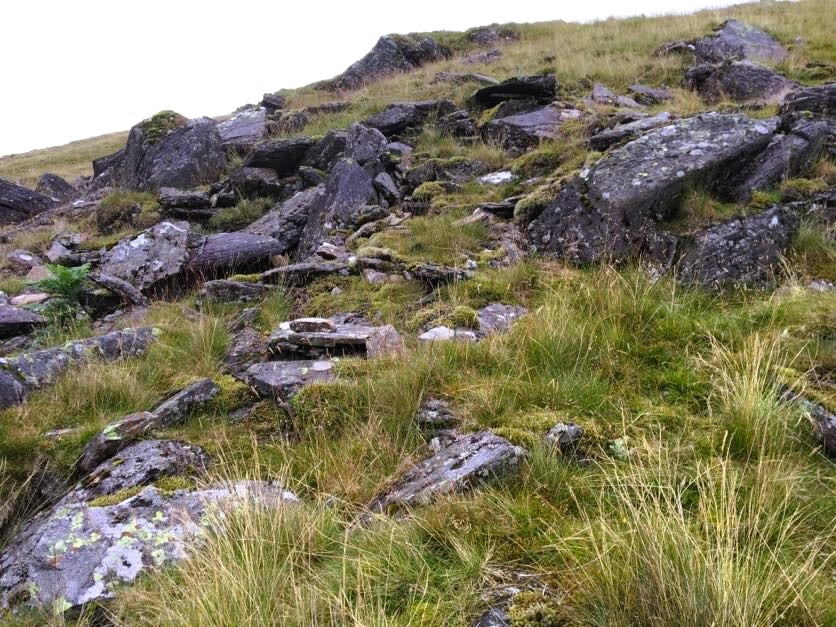
Sinen Gill

The geologist James Clifton Ward, who, before he became curate of St. John’s, Keswick, in 1880, had carried out excellent work surveying the northern part of the Lake District as part of the first geological Survey of the district, whilst not actually pinpointing the exact location, refers to an area that he describes as being “the junction with the granite of Sinen Gill”, more or less midway between Skiddaw and Blencathra, and this is reasonable cause for belief that this may have been where Joseph Richardson sourced his stones.

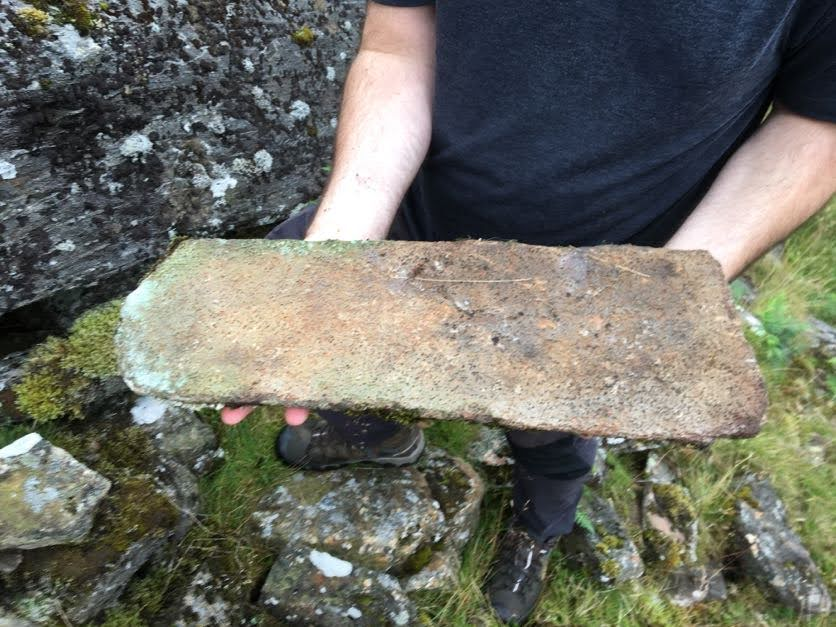
A piece of hornfels, Sinen Gill

Further research has been carried out over the years in an effort to pinpoint the exact source of the stones. In 1967, E.H. Shackleton, in his book Lakeland Geology – Where to go, What to see located the source as the streamside of Roughton Gill, a short way south of Sinen Gill, and this view has been supported by several other sources. However, Smith and Yardley state that:

Close examination of the streamside of Roughton Gill certainly reveals much evidence of quarrying of the bedrock. However the material does not have a good ring and the slabs come away in much thicker and more irregular pieces than the 2.5–3 cm thick pieces in the musical stones. It would seem more likely that this site was used as a source of building slabs for the nearby mine buildings.

All evidence points to the area of Sinen Gill being the most likely source of the stones. Smith and Yardley, in a research paper published for the Cumberland Geological Society in 2008, wrote:

The upper part of the Sinen Gill valley looks like a very likely source of material that could have been shaped into musical stones. The granite is only clearly exposed along a section of the stream bed of Sinen Gill for about 170m. On the spur top approximately 100m south of the Gill there are some huge granite slabs exposed at the surface (over 5m in length), which may be in situ. The hornfels is well exposed in this area with prominent crags on both sides of the valley and large areas of loose slabby scree. The material has a very strong bedded fabric and importantly is seen to break relatively easily into flat slabs close to the optimum thickness of 2.5–3cm seen in the musical stones. Thin slabs throughout this area ring when struck with a geological hammer.

Another consideration is that the area of Sinen Gill would have been reasonably accessible for Joseph Richardson. Reports exist of the Richardson family taking outings to the fells with a horse and cart in the search for possible stones, with potential pieces being conveyed back to Applethwaite in readiness for Joseph Richardson to spend long hours shaping and tuning the slabs to the required size and note. The well-graded and wide mine track up to the area from Threlkeld would have provided easy access for horses and carts, whereas the area of the inner aureole beyond Sinen Gill does not have any suitable tracks.

That said, it is a remote location, standing at 1,805 feet (550 m) and about 6.2 miles (10.0 km) from Keswick, and not much less from Applethwaite, with only a handful of mine trackways and fellside paths for access.
