= Keswick Museum =

Museum in Keswick, United Kingdom

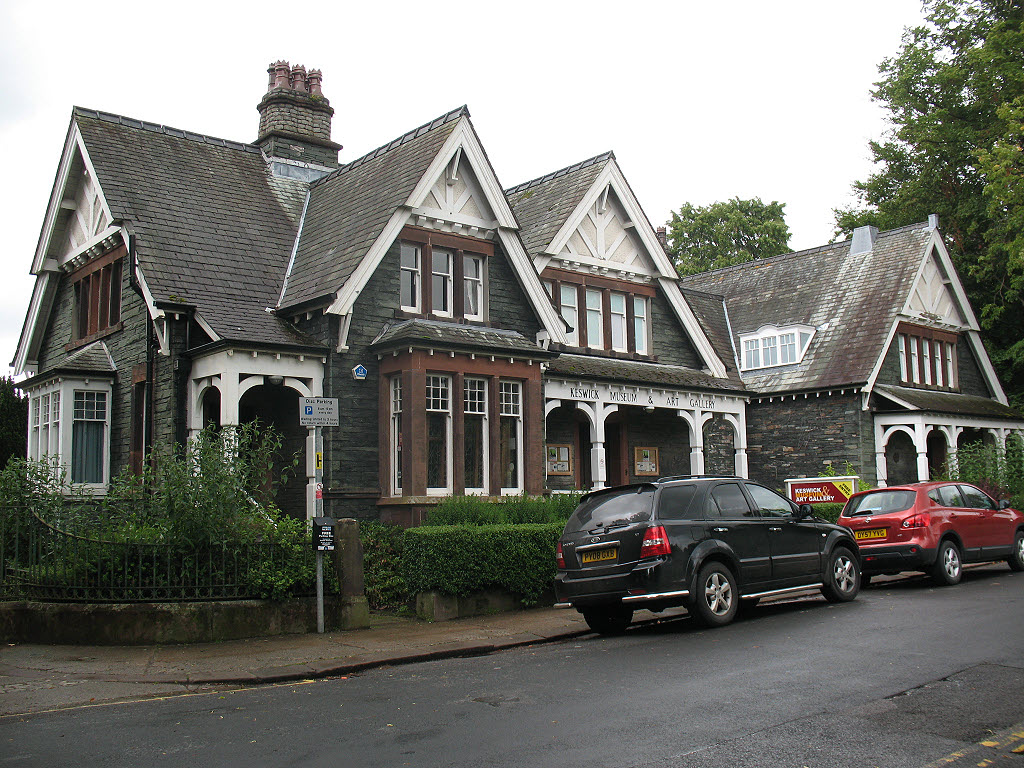
- Keswick Museum and Art Gallery in 2011

- Location in Allerdale, Cumbria Location in the Lake District National Park, England
- Established: 1873
- Coordinates: 54.6031°N 3.1329°W
- Website: keswickmuseum.org.uk

Keswick Museum is a local museum based in Keswick in the English Lake District, which exhibits aspects of the landscape, history and culture of the area.

== History ==
The collection was established as the Keswick Museum of Local and Natural History, a creation of the Keswick Literary and Scientific Society, in the Moot Hall, in 1873. An important item in the original collection at the Moot Hall was a three-dimensional model of the Lake District, measuring 12 feet by 9 feet, made by Joseph Flintoft in 1837.

The collection moved to purpose-built facilities, in Fitz Park, constructed as a memorial to the Hewetson brothers, distinguished Keswick benefactors, in 1897. Cannon Hardwicke Rawnsley, one of the founders of the National Trust, attended the opening of the art gallery at the museum, in 1906.

The Fitz Park Trust got into financial difficulties and the collection was rescued by Allerdale Council in April 1994. Then, in February 2007, Keswick Museum and Art Gallery Management Limited was formed to operate the museum on behalf of the council as the sole trustee.

The building was extensively refurbished, with financial support from the Heritage Lottery Fund, at a cost of £2.1 million between September 2012 and May 2014.

== The collection ==
The museum has a collection of about 20,000 objects, of which 5-10% are on display. While these include material relating to the whole of north Cumbria, the museum now only collects items from the Derwent Seven Parishes, approximately the CA12 postcode area.

The collection includes artifacts from Keswick's landscape, history, arts and culture as well as the three-dimensional model made by Joseph Flintoft. It also includes The Musical Stones of Skiddaw, a number of lithophones built across two centuries around the town of Keswick using hornfels, a stone from the nearby Skiddaw mountain, which is said to have a superior tone and longer ring than the more commonly used slate. Other items in the collection include a 700-year-old cat (found mummified within the wall of a church at Clifton near Penrith), and a collection of around 80 pieces of work by the Keswick School of Industrial Art.

The museum holds various documents, maps and literary materials associated with the Lake poets and other writers, including William Wordsworth, Thomas De Quincey, Hartley Coleridge, Hugh Walpole, Eliza Lynn Linton, Canon H.D. Rawnsley, and John Ruskin. The life and works of Robert Southey, who resided in Keswick between 1803 and 1843, is particularly well-represented.

The Mountain Heritage Trust maintained a changing exhibition in the museum between 2014 and 2021. In 2018/19 "Man and Mountain" featured Chris Bonington, and in 2019/20 it focused on Siegfried Herford.
