= Lithophone =

Musical percussion instrument made from rock

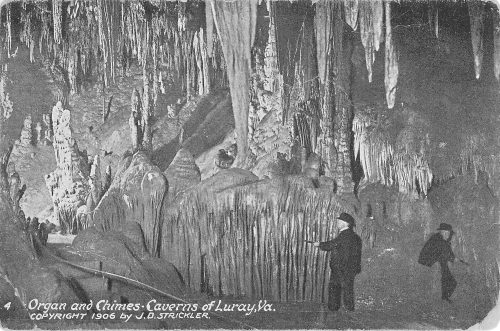
1906 postcard of a lithophone played in Luray Caverns, Virginia

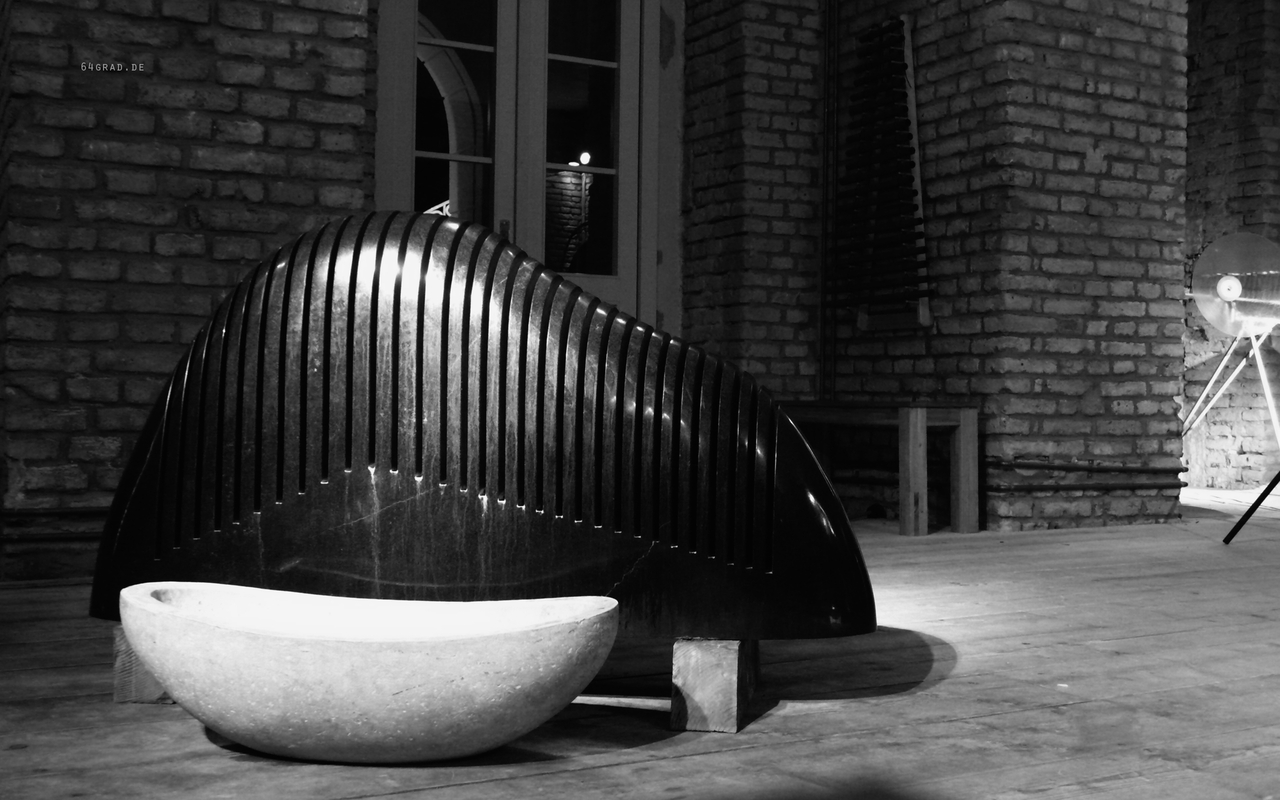
Lithophone sculpture in Schloss Freudenberg

A lithophone is a musical instrument consisting of a rock or pieces of rock which are struck to produce musical notes. Notes may be sounded in combination (producing harmony) or in succession (melody). It is an idiophone comparable to instruments such as the glockenspiel, vibraphone, xylophone and marimba.

In the Hornbostel-Sachs classification system, lithophones are designated as '111.22' – directly-struck percussion plaques.

== History ==
Research has found evidence of lithophones dating from prehistoric times.

The first documented description is from Peter Crosthwaite in his memorandum on 11 June 1785. He described them as "Music Stones," rediscovering the Lithophone and creating one that stayed at the Keswick Museum and Art Gallery. Crosthwaite assembled 6 different stones (later adding 10 more over 6 months), each with their own pitch to complete the major scale. The length and thickness of each rock determines its pitch. Longer and thicker rocks gave lower note pitches and vice versa. Crosthwaite assembled the stones on ropes to allow them to ring out from left (the lowest notes) to right (the highest notes) with 16 stones in total.

== Notable examples ==
A rudimentary form of lithophone is the "rock gong", usually a natural rock formation opportunistically adapted to produce musical tones, such as that on Mfangano Island, in Lake Victoria, Kenya. The Gaval Dash in Gobustan State Historical and Cultural Reserve outside Baku, Azerbaijan is a natural stone that sounds like tambourine when struck with smaller rocks. The Great Stalacpipe Organ of Luray Caverns, Virginia, USA uses 37 stalactites to produce the Western scale. Other stalactite lithophones are at Tenkasi in South India, and at Ringing Rocks Park in Pennsylvania. An example that is no longer used is at Cave of the Winds, in Colorado Springs.

The Txalaparta (or Chalaparta), a traditional Basque instrument, can be made of wood or stone, but is traditionally wood.

More sophisticated lithophones utilize trimmed and individually mounted stones to achieve full-scale instruments:

- Probable prehistoric lithophone stones have been found at Sankarjang in Odisha, India.
- Recent research into usage wear and acoustics of prehistoric stone artefacts in North America and Europe has revealed a number of possible portable lithophones.
- Vietnamese lithophones dating back to ancient times, called đàn đá, have been discovered and revived in the 20th century.
- The ritual music of Korea features the use of stone chimes called pyeongyeong, derived from the Chinese bianqing.
- The Musical Stones of Skiddaw from Cumbria, England have been made into an instrument placed at Keswick Museum and Art Gallery.
- A lithophone called the Musical Stones has been created at Brantwood, the former home of John Ruskin in Cumbria, England, and may be played there by visitors.
- The Silex Piano, circa 1885, employed suspended flints of various sizes which were struck with other flints to produce sounds.
- Composer-vibraphonist Wolfgang Lackerschmid uses an instrument called the gramorimba, which is featured alongside the vibraphone and marimba in a trio setting.
- Icelandic post-rock band Sigur Rós played a slate marimba, which sculptor Páll Guðmundsson constructed from rocks found in Iceland. This is demonstrated in their DVD Heima.
- The stone marimba.
- The hōkyō, a lithophone invented in Japan, has been made from the bars of sanukite.
- The German composer Carl Orff calls for a lithophone called Steinspiel in his later works.
- UK musician, Tony Dale developed a resonated slate lithophone in 1984 featured by composer John Hardy.

== As architectural elements ==
Ancient Indians were perhaps the first to use man-made lithophones as architectural elements. Temples like Nellaiyappar temple (8th century) in Tirunelveli, Vijaya Vitthala temple (15th century) in Hampi, Madurai Meenakshi temple (16th century) and Suchindram Thanumalayan temple (17th century) have musical pillars.

== Stone marimba ==
A stone marimba is configured in the same manner as the more typical wooden bar marimba. The bars are usually wide like a wooden marimba, but are thinner, which helps increase resonance. The stone marimba may or may not have resonators.

In 1949 an ancient stone marimba was discovered in modern-day Vietnam near a village called Ndut Lieng Krak. The 11 stone plates, made of schist, were chipped into the tuning of a pentatonic scale. They are currently housed at the Musée de l'Homme and may be the oldest known musical instrument.

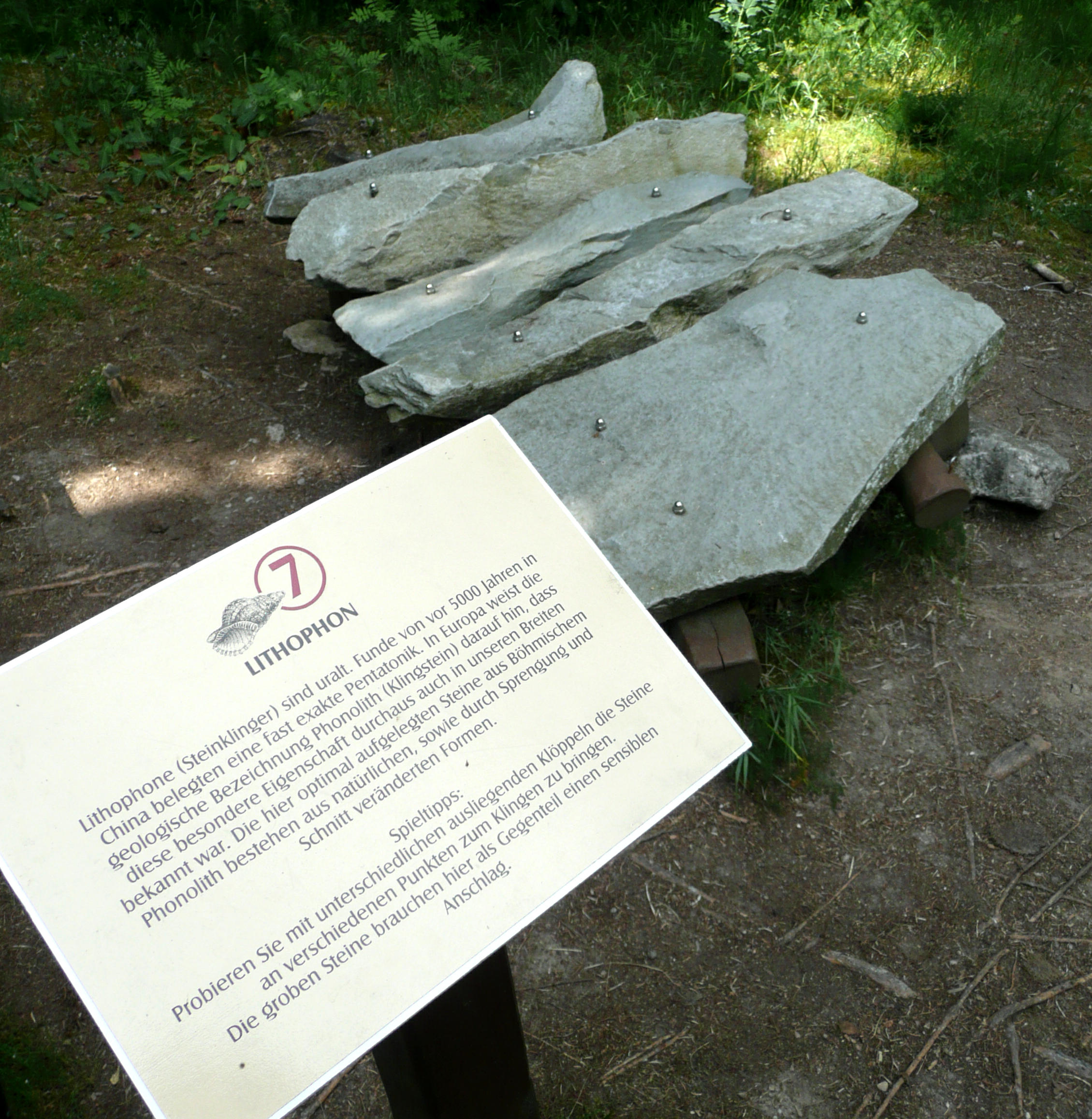
Lithophone made of Phonolite in the Schellerhau botanic garden (Germany)

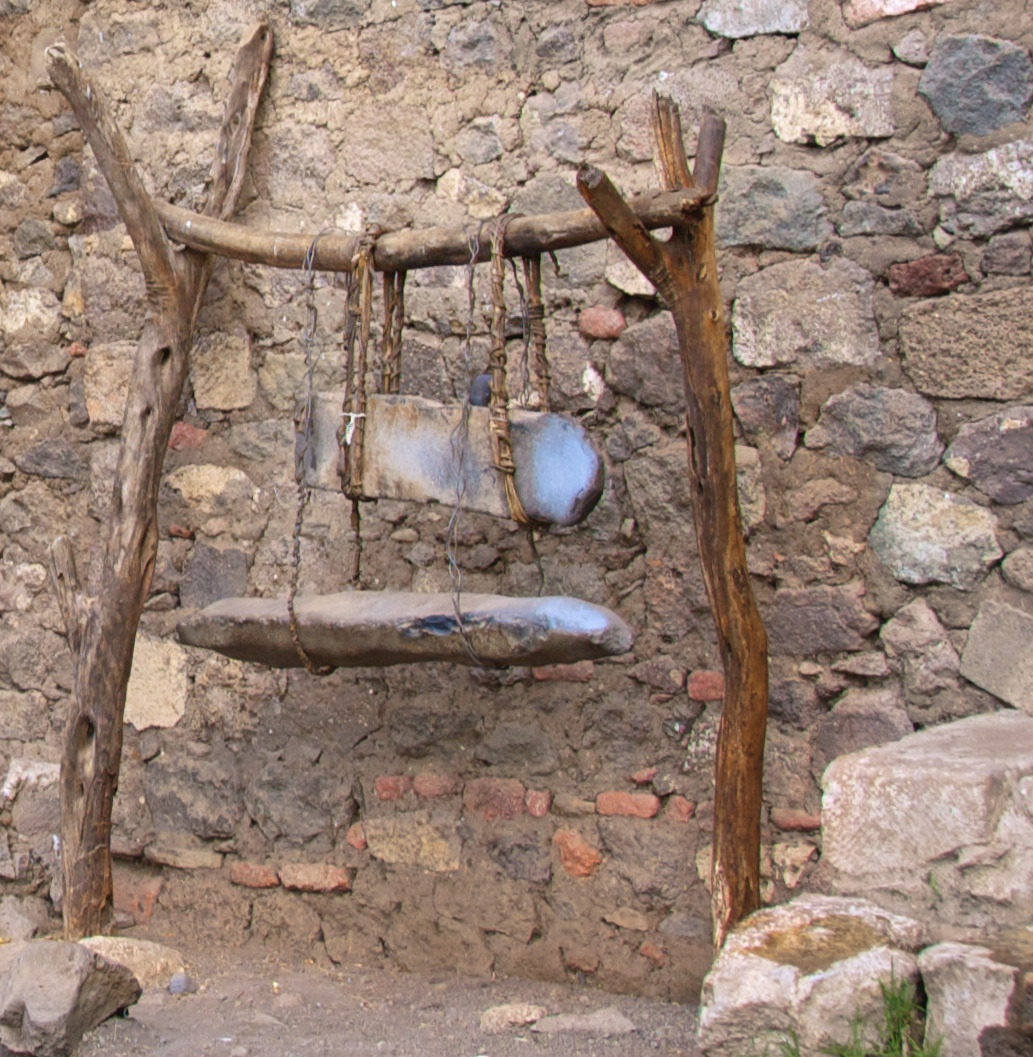
Ethiopian Lithophones with Stand, Monastery of Na’akuto La’ab

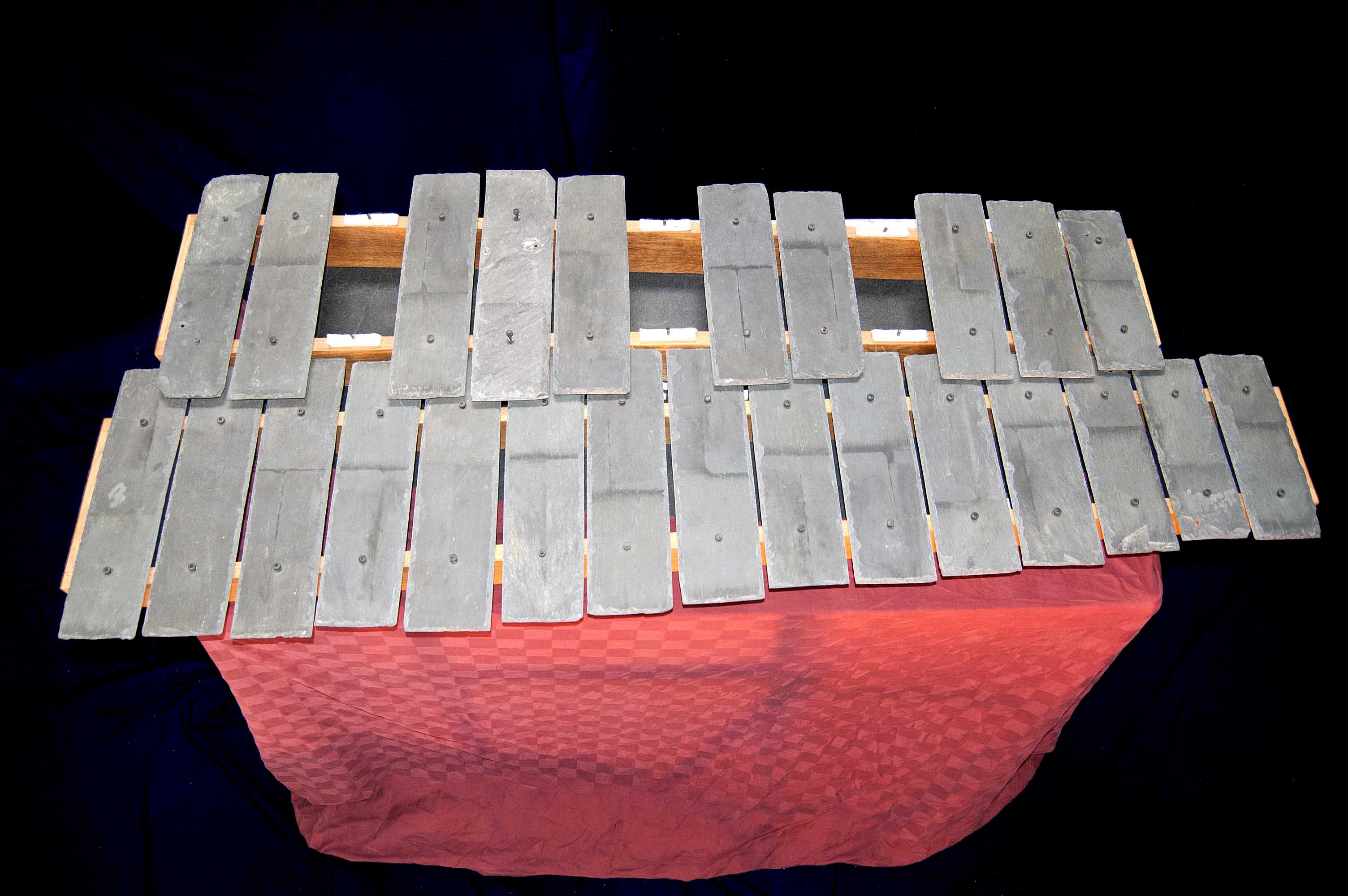
Stone marimba, range C3–C5

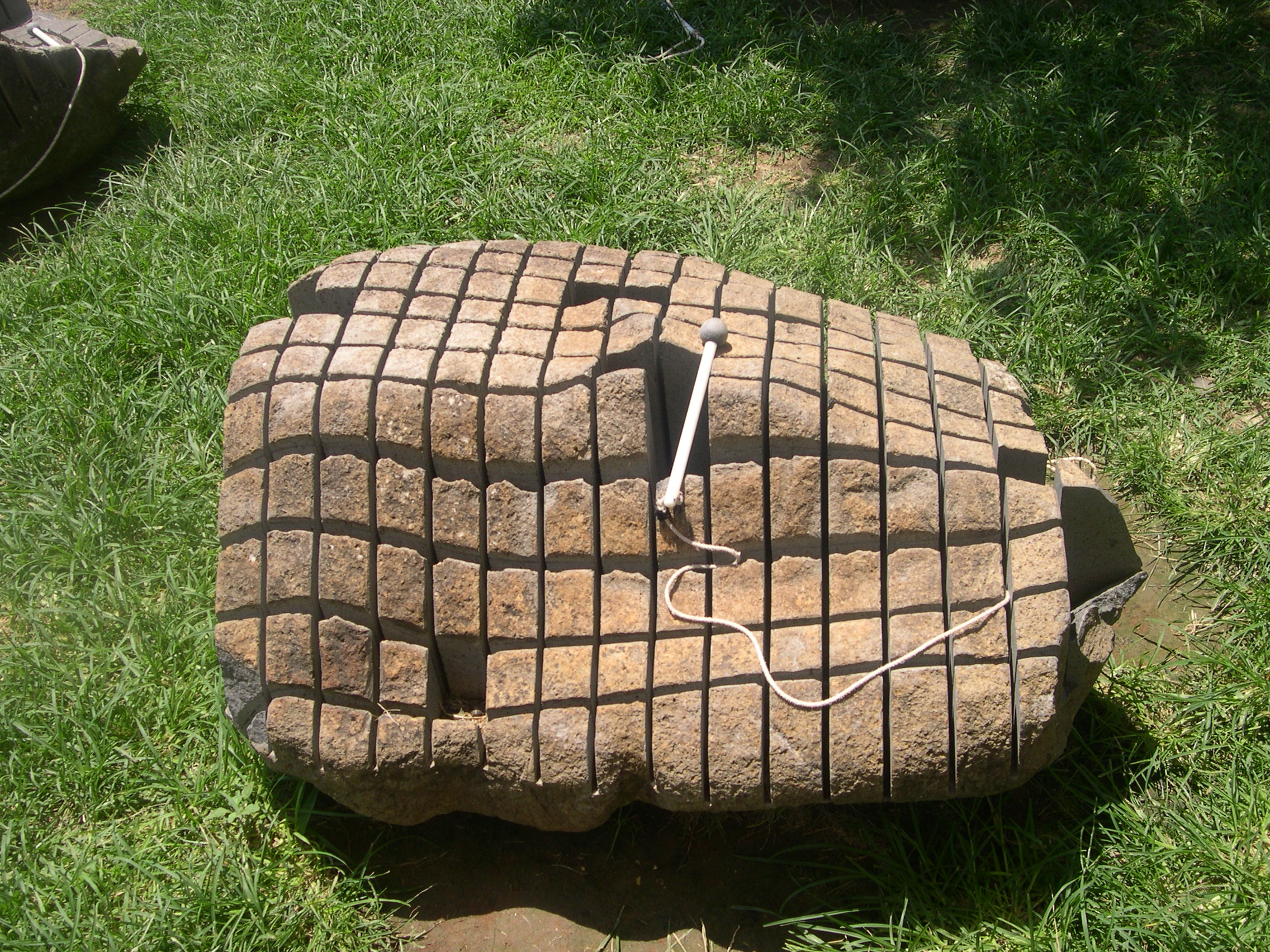
Stone xylophone, Clore Garden of Science, Weizmann Institute of Science, Rehovot, Israel

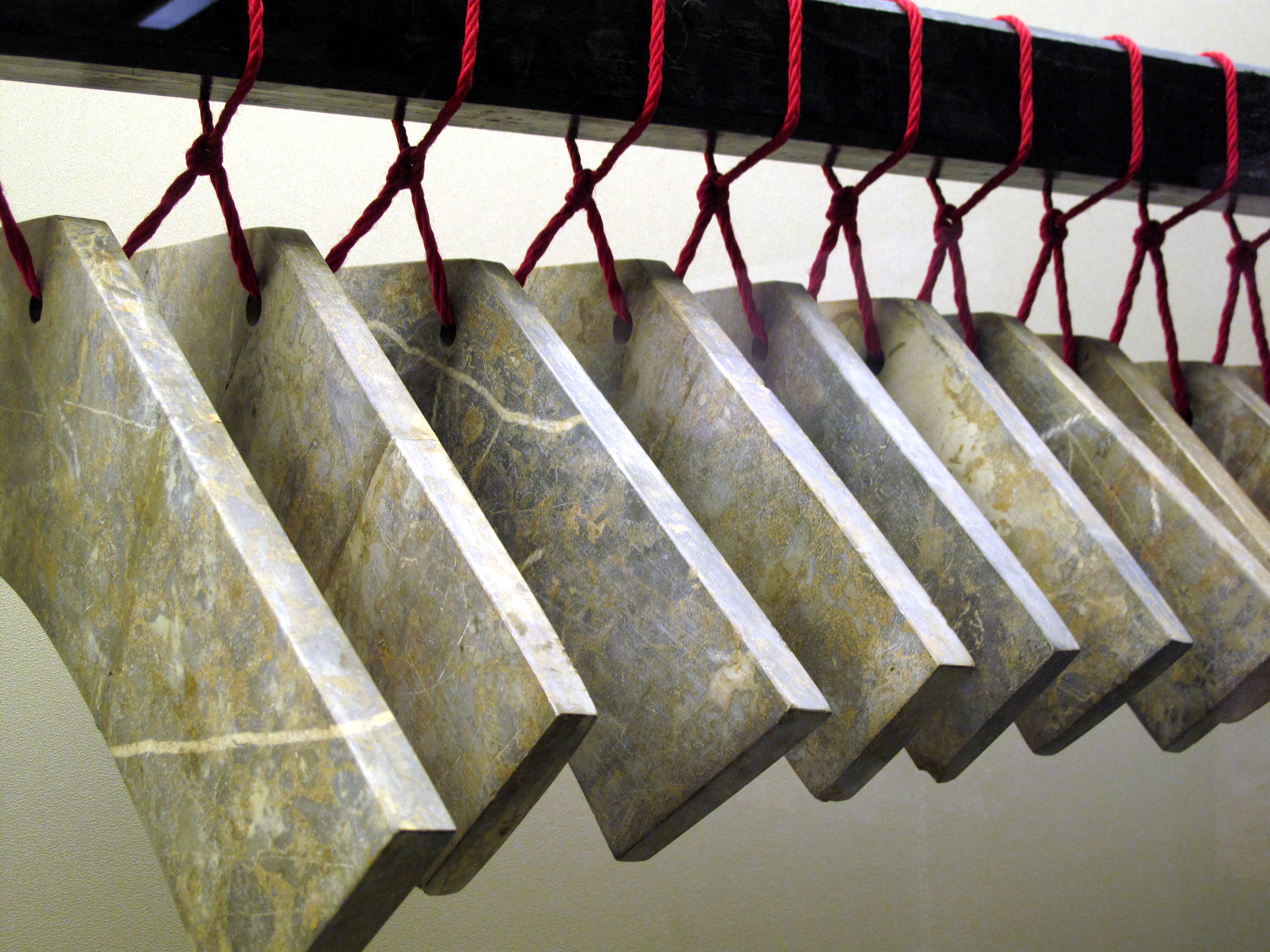
Stone chimes, Shandong Provincial Museum, Jinan

== See also ==
- Phonolite
- Ringing rocks
- Sankarjang
