= Albert Gordon =

Albert Gordon may refer to:

- Albert Hamilton Gordon (1901–2009), head of investment bank Kidder, Peabody & Co.
- Albert L. Gordon (1915–2009), attorney and gay rights activist
- Albert Gordon, producer for Brockhampton
