= University of La Verne College of Law =

Law school in California, United States of America

- Motto: Quality by Tradition
- Parent school: University of La Verne
- Established: 1970
- School type: Private
- Dean: Kevin Marshall
- Location: Ontario, California, United States; 34°03′59″N 117°38′50″W
- Enrollment: 426 (full-time & part-time)
- Faculty: 34
- USNWR ranking: Unranked
- Bar pass rate: 75% (February 2025 first-time takers); 61.5% (February 2025 repeat takers)
- Website: law.laverne.edu

The University of La Verne College of Law is the law school of the University of La Verne, a private university in Ontario, California. It was founded in 1970 and is accredited by the State Bar of California but not accredited by the ABA.

== History ==
In 1970, Los Angeles County Superior Court Judge Paul Egly established the law school. In 1985, the school merged with the San Fernando Valley College of Law; however, the two operated as independent entities within the University of La Verne until 2002 when the University of West Los Angeles purchased the San Fernando Valley College of Law campus. In 2001, the law school relocated to Ontario, California.

In 2006, the college first received provisional accreditation by the American Bar Association (ABA). In June 2011, the ABA denied the college full accreditation. On August 29, 2011, the school received approval from the Committee of Bar Examiners of the State Bar of California. In March 2012, the ABA again granted provisional accreditation. Finally, on March 14, 2016, the college received full accreditation from the ABA. However, in November 2019, the college's board of trustees voted to convert the school from an ABA-accredited institution to one approved and accredited by the State Bar of California instead. The move followed an investigation by the school's faculty and administrators to evaluate the source of declining enrollment and avoid closure. The school's decision was also influenced by the ABA's introduction of tougher accreditation standards in May 2019, which shortened the timeframe schools have to ensure a 75-percent bar pass rate from five to two years.

== Academics ==
The college offers the Juris Doctor (JD), which can be completed on a full-time basis over three years or part-time over four years. The school also offers two dual-degree programs in conjunction with the University of La Verne College of Business and Public Management: the Juris Doctor/Master of Business Administration (JD/MBA) and Juris Doctor/Master of Public Administration (JD/MPA).

The University of La Verne College of Law is accredited by the State Bar of California but is not accredited by the American Bar Association. Students entering in the fall of 2020 and thereafter may not qualify to take a bar examination or be admitted to practice law in jurisdictions other than California. The University of La Verne is accredited by the WASC Senior College and University Commission which includes the law college.

=== Admissions ===
According to the January 2022 Annual Disclosure under the California Business & Professions Code, the school accepted 42.76% of applicants, with 64.55% of those accepted enrolling. The average enrollee had a 145 LSAT score and 3.62 undergraduate GPA.

=== Bar passage ===
For the February 2025 California Bar Examination, 75% of College of Law alumni taking the exam for the first time passed, vs. a 70.2% pass rate for all first-time takers, and 61.5% College of Law alumni repeat takers passed.

=== Law reviews, journals and publications ===
- University of La Verne Law Review ISSN 1944-382X OCLC 226246367
- Journal of Juvenile Law ISSN 0160-2098 OCLC 3367760
- Journal of Legal Advocacy & Practice ISSN 1534-5599 OCLC 42705442
- Inter alia OCLC 44514382
- Grand Jury Training (2003). Published by La Verne College of Law and the California Grand Jurors' Association (video seminar) OCLC 52204131

=== Legal clinics and student programs ===
The college opened a disability rights legal clinic in the summer of 2007, followed by a justice and immigration legal clinic. Additional programs for students include clinical externships and practicums in Family Law and Lawyering Skills.

== Employment ==
According to the La Verne College of Law's official ABA-required disclosures for 2018 graduates, 51.72% found some form of full-time employment while 24.14% did not (the rest were not in full-time employment, not seeking employment, or unknown). Of graduates, 22.41% obtained JD required employment (i.e. as attorneys). Of the 22.41% of graduates who obtained attorney employment, 53.33% went into small firms, no graduates went into medium-sized law firms, 20.0% went into business, and 13.33% went into government employment (the rest of attorney employment was short-term or part-time). No employment was reported to the ABA for 2019 or 2020 graduates.

ABA Employment Summary 2018 Graduates
Employment Status	Percentage
Employed - Bar Passage Required	22.41%
Employed - J.D. Advantage	20.69%
Employed - Professional Position	6.9%
Employed - Non-Professional Position	6.9%
Pursuing Graduate Degree Full Time	5.17%
Unemployed - Not Seeking	3.45%
Unemployed - Seeking	24.14%
Employment Status Unknown	5.17%
Total of 58 Graduates

== Notable alumni ==
- Ronald Richards (JD 1995), criminal defense attorney
- Jessica Dominguez (JD 2000), American immigration lawyer based in California
- Victor Gordo (JD 2001), Mayor of Pasadena, California
- Phil Esbenshade (JD 2003), professional skateboarder
