= Ronald Richards (lawyer) =

American lawyer

Ronald Neil Richards
- Born: Ronald Neil Richards; April 7, 1967 (age 59); Los Angeles, California, US
- Education: University of California, Los Angeles (BA); UCLA Anderson School of Management (GCert); University of La Verne College of Law (JD)
- Occupation: Criminal defense / civil litigation attorney
- Years active: 1995–present
- Spouses: Louise Linton (m. 2006; div. 2009) Lauren Boyette-Richards (m. 2013)
- Website: ronaldrichards.com

Ronald Neil Richards (born April 7, 1967) is a Beverly Hills, California based criminal defense and civil litigation attorney who has made national media appearances as a legal expert commentator. He was the first lawyer to be cited on California Proposition 215 (1996), the medical marijuana statute, and worked as a professor of law at the University of West Los Angeles from 2006 to 2007. Since 2011, Richards has sat as a temporary judge on the Los Angeles Superior Court.

== Early and personal life ==
Educated at Beverly Hills High School, he later gained a BA in Political Science at University of California, Los Angeles. While studying at the University of La Verne College of Law, he was elected Student Faculty Representative, and acted as advocate for students facing discipline. He also won the American Jurisprudence Award in bankruptcy. He also is an alumnus of the Anderson School of Management at UCLA and has a certificate of management. He is a lifelong resident of Beverly Hills, California and is very active in the community, including the Beverly Hills Police Officers Association.

He was married to Louise Linton. He is currently married to Lauren Boyette-Richards.

== Career ==
In 2004, Richards was the NBC News Legal Analyst for the Michael Jackson trial.

From August 2006 to January 2007, Richards also worked as a professor of law at the University of West Los Angeles.

In 2011, he obtained a $630,000 settlement against Tom Cruise's ex-wife for a client and won a $1,000,000 judgment against a real estate developer at trial in Las Vegas, Nevada.

In 2012, Richards won over $40 million in commercial guaranty and borrower enforcement judgments. He collected far over that amount through ADR and pretrial resolutions. The firm successfully closed over $100 million in debt transactions. Richards had a decision published in the 9th Circuit Court of Appeals that dramatically improved the rights of persons who contested forfeiture proceedings.

On September 9, 2014, the United States Patent and Trademark Office approved Ronald Richards & Associates' trademark.

In December 2019, Richards was admitted into the D.C. Bar.

In 2021, Richards was fired as the trustee's special counsel in the bankruptcy case In re: Girardi Keese 2:20-BK21022 Bankruptcy Court - Central District of California Filed December 18, 2020.

== Notable cases ==
In 2000 in U. S v. Orgad, Richards represented Jacob "Cookie" Orgad (No. 00-344 FMC) and had the charges dismissed in Los Angeles due to government violating the Speedy Trial Act. The case was dismissed with prejudice. Subsequent to this rare procedural victory, Orgad was indicated in New York on related charges. Richards was disqualified as trial counsel only due to the fact that Richards may have been a witness in the case. Ultimately, Mr. Orgad pleaded guilty without the aid of Richards in his New York case after he had lost the attorney who had won his case in Los Angeles. This was a play out of the John Gotti playbook where the government disqualified Bruce Cutler causing Gotti to lose his trusted advocate. Ironically, the trial court judge now a defense attorney was the prosecutor who used the same tactic against Bruce Cutler.

In 2003, in U.S. v. Tamer Adel IBRAHIM (9th Cir. 2008) 522 F.3d 1003 (No. 07-50153), Richards represented alleged drugs courier and dealer Tamer Adel Ibrahim. During the search of Ibrahim's apartment in 1999, state and federal law enforcement officers seized nearly $500,000 in cash; Ibrahim was eventually convicted and sentenced to 188 months in prison and ordered to pay $9 million in fines and restitution. Shortly after the seizure, the United States moved to forfeit the money seized from Ibrahim's apartment but sent the notice to Ibrahim's cousin John instead. In 2006, Tamer Ibrahim filed for return of property, as he had never received proper notice of forfeiture from the government. The motion for return of property was denied in district court, and Richards, representing Tamer Ibrahim, successfully argued to overturn the seizure ruling before the Ninth Circuit Court of Appeals. After the forfeiture order was reversed, the government settled the case with Ibrahim and released him five years early.

In February 2011, in People v. Troyer (2011) 51 Cal.4th 599, Richards filed an amicus curiae brief to the case, stating that "judges evaluating police searches must look at whether police had an objectively reasonable basis to believe there was an emergency", citing the conflict between People v. Ray (1999) and Brigham City v. Stuart. The Supreme Court of California ruled that the entry of local police in Sacramento County into the bedroom of Albert Troyer without a warrant was legal, covered by the emergency-aid exception to the Fourth Amendment's legal protections against unreasonable search and seizure.

In 2011, Richards represented former venture capitalist Russell Armstrong in numerous matters. Russell was married to Taylor Armstrong, a cast member of the Bravo TV series The Real Housewives of Beverly Hills. After allegations of money troubles and claims of domestic violence surfaced within the show, Russell committed suicide, found by his landlord and Taylor on August 15, 2011.

In June 2014, Richards successfully represented Navabeh Borman in the California Court of Appeal in suing her ex-attorney Hillel Chodos in Chodos v. Borman (2014) 227 Cal.App.4th 76. Borman was being sued by Chodos for unpaid attorney fees relating to Borman's divorce and subsequent Marvin action, which had resulted in a tax-free $26 million settlement to Borman. Justice Richard Mosk said that Judge Barbara Ann Meiers in her original ruling should not have allowed the jury to consider a multiplier, and hence reduced Chodos's payment from $7.8 million to $1.8 million, which the court said represented a reasonable hourly rate of $1,000 for the 1,800 hours the jury found Chodos had worked on the case.
