= Ed Westwick =

English actor and musician (born 1987)

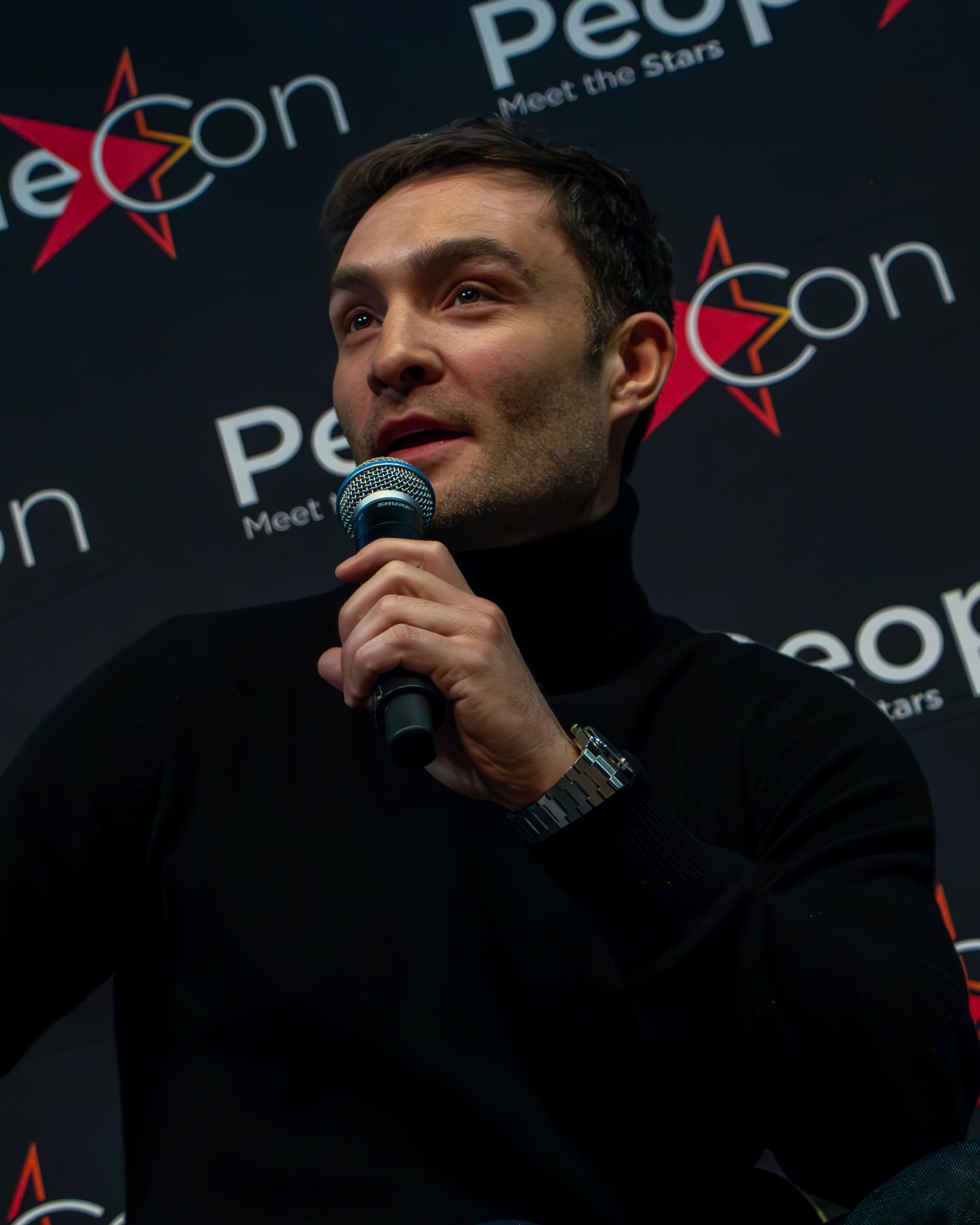
- Westwick in 2024
- Born: 27 June 1987 (age 39)
- Occupations: Actor; musician
- Years active: 2006–present
- Spouse: Amy Jackson (m. 2024)
- Children: 2

Ed Westwick (born 27 June 1987) is an English actor and musician best known for his role as Chuck Bass on The CW's Gossip Girl as well as Vincent Swan in the TV series White Gold. He made his feature film debut in Children of Men (2006) and has since featured in the films Breaking and Entering (2006), Son of Rambow (2007), S. Darko (2009), Chalet Girl (2011), J. Edgar (2011), Romeo & Juliet (2013), Bone in the Throat (2015), Freaks of Nature (2015), Billionaire Ransom (2016) and Me You Madness (2021).

== Early life ==
Westwick was raised in Stevenage, Hertfordshire and has two older brothers. He began music lessons and attended a Saturday morning drama school from the age of six. Westwick was educated at The Barclay School and North Hertfordshire College, where he took A-levels in business, law and communication. He was a member of the National Youth Theatre in London.

Westwick shared an apartment with his Gossip Girl co-star Chace Crawford in the Chelsea neighbourhood of Manhattan from the beginning of the series in 2007 until July 2009, when Crawford moved out. Westwick is a Chelsea supporter.

== Career ==
=== Acting ===
Westwick made his film debut in Breaking and Entering (2006), following an open audition casting call sent to the National Youth Theatre. In 2007, Westwick appeared in the film Son of Rambow and was cast as Chuck Bass in The CW's teen drama series Gossip Girl, based on the book series of the same name by Cecily von Ziegesar. Westwick said of his casting: "There wasn't much work in the UK. I was only in LA for a month and I got this show. It's changed my life." For his portrayal of Chuck, he assumed an American accent, based on the character Carlton Banks from The Fresh Prince of Bel-Air. As a result of the show's success, he was named one of 2008's Sexiest Men Alive by People, and appeared the following year on its "100 Most Beautiful" list with the whole cast of Gossip Girl. Westwick earned the 2008 and 2009 awards for Best TV Villain at the Teen Choice Awards, and was named Breakthrough Talent by GQ in 2010. Entertainment Weekly also named Westwick's character Chuck Bass number one in their "Best Dressed TV Characters of 2008" list (tied with Leighton Meester's character Blair Waldorf), as well as in their "Best Performances" list alongside co-star Meester.

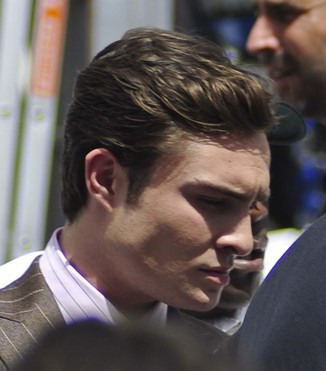
Westwick on the set of Gossip Girl in 2010

In 2008, Westwick became the new face of K-Swiss. That same year, he appeared as Joey in the horror film 100 Feet. In 2009, Westwick played the role of Randy Holt in the sequel to Donnie Darko, directed by Chris Fisher, and guest-starred in the third season of the Showtime original series Californication, as Chris "Balt" Smith, a student who was fascinated with vampire literature. In May 2009, he was attached to play Heathcliff in the film adaptation of Wuthering Heights. However, in January 2010, director Peter Webber left the project, which was then passed into the hands of Andrea Arnold. This directing change caused the roles to be recast.

In 2010, Westwick starred in the McHenry Brothers short film The Commuter, which was shot on a Nokia N8 smartphone. In January 2011, Westwick joined Clint Eastwood's film J. Edgar, a biopic about J. Edgar Hoover, the controversial first director of the FBI. That same year, he appeared in the romantic comedy Chalet Girl. He co-narrated the audiobook version of City of Fallen Angels by Cassandra Clare and also narrated Clare's second novel Clockwork Prince from The Infernal Devices series. In mid-2011, Westwick became an international celebrity endorser for Penshoppe, a local clothing brand in the Philippines.

He next co-starred in the film adaptation of Romeo & Juliet as the main antagonist and Juliet's cousin, Tybalt. The film was released on 11 October 2013. Westwick then portrayed the lead role in the film adaptation of Anthony Bourdain's novel Bone in the Throat, which premiered at South by Southwest on 14 March 2015. Westwick then co-starred in the horror comedy film Freaks of Nature, which was released on 30 October 2015. In March 2015, he joined the cast of ABC's short-lived crime drama series Wicked City as Kent Grainger, a sadistic Sunset Strip serial killer. The series was cancelled after airing three episodes, but was picked up by Hulu to air the remaining five episodes. Westwick was next seen in Jim Gillespie's Billionaire Ransom, released on 19 August 2016, and stars in the thriller The Crash, released on 13 January 2017.

Westwick played Vincent Swan in the BBC Two television comedy series White Gold (2017). The show has so far aired two seasons, for a total of twelve episodes.

Westwick starred in Me You Madness (2021), co-starring and directed by Louise Linton.

=== Music ===
Westwick was a member of the British band The Filthy Youth. The punk band, formed in 2006, was inspired by the Rolling Stones, The Doors and Kings of Leon. The songs "Come Flash All You Ladies" and "Orange" were both featured in an episode of Gossip Girl. The band consisted of fellow countrymen Benjamin Lewis Allingham (guitar), Jimmy Wright (guitar), Tom Bastiani (bass), and John Vooght (drummer).

Westwick is also the vocalist of the band For You, who released their first single "Tailspin" on 15 January 2023.

=== Business ===
In July 2025 it was announced that Westwick would become a shareholder and ambassador for online casino business Gamblr.

== Personal life ==
On January 29, 2024, Westwick announced that he had become engaged to actress Amy Jackson in Gstaad. On August 7, 2024, the couple had a civil marriage ceremony at the Connaught Hotel. They had a further ceremony on August 23 of that year in Lustra, Campania. Guests at the wedding included Kelly Rutherford, who played Westwick's on-screen stepmother in Gossip Girl, and comedian Jack Whitehall.

On October 31, 2024, the couple announced they were expecting their first child together. On March 24, 2025, they revealed that their son, Oscar Alexander, had been born. Westwick is the stepfather of Jackson's son, Andreas, from her previous relationship.

In November 2017, sexual assault and rape allegations were made by three women. All three incidents allegedly occurred in 2014. Westwick vehemently denied the allegations, describing them as "unverified and provably untrue". As a result, filming of the series White Gold was temporarily "paused" and forty-five minutes of footage from 35 of his scenes from Ordeal by Innocence were reshot over 12 days with Christian Cooke replacing Westwick.

In July 2018, the Los Angeles District Attorney announced that no action would be taken and Westwick would not be prosecuted or charged regarding any of the allegations. Prosecutors said they did not have enough evidence to pursue charges and were unable to contact the third alleged claimant. Prosecutors also noted additional claims would not be pursued, due to being outside the statute of limitations. In November 2018, it was announced that Westwick had resumed filming for series 2 of White Gold, which was broadcast in 2019.

== Filmography ==
=== Film ===
Year	Title	Role	Notes	Ref.
2006	Children of Men	Alex		
2006	Breaking and Entering	Zoran		
2007	Son of Rambow	Lawrence Carter		
2008	100 Feet	Joseph "Joey" DiCenzo		
2009	S. Darko	Randy Holt		
2010	The Commuter	Bellboy	Short film	
2011	Chalet Girl	Jonny Masden		
2011	J. Edgar	Agent Smith		
2013	Romeo & Juliet	Tybalt		
2014	Last Flight	Charles Gillis		
2015	Bone in the Throat	Will Reeves		
2015	Freaks of Nature	Milan Pinache		
2016	Billionaire Ransom	Billy Speck		
2017	The Crash	Ben Collins		
2020	Tether	Man	Short film	
2020	Enemy Lines	Kaminski		
2021	Me You Madness	Tyler Jones		
2022	Wolves of War	Jack Wallace		
2023	Deep Fear	Jackson		
2024	DarkGame	Ben Jacobs		
2025	Tonic	Stanley Roberson		

=== Television ===
Year	Title	Role	Notes	Ref.
2006	Doctors	Holden Edwards	Episode: "Young Mothers Do Have 'Em"	
2006	Casualty	Johnny Cullin	Episode: "Family Matters"	
2006	Afterlife	Darren	Episode: "Roadside Bouquets"	
2007–2012	Gossip Girl	Charles Bartholomew "Chuck" Bass	Series regular; 117 episodes	
2009	Californication	Chris "Balt" Smith	Episode: "The Land of Rape and Honey"	
2015	Wicked City	Kent Grainger	Series regular; 8 episodes	
2017	Family Guy	Football Player / Wedding Officiant	Episode: "The Finer Strings"	
2017	Snatch	Sonny Castillo	Recurring role; 4 episodes	
2017–2019	White Gold	Vincent Swan	Series regular; 12 episodes	
2025	Sandokan	Lord James Brooke	Series regular; 8 episodes	

=== Music videos ===
Year	Title	Role	Artist	Ref.
2018	"Give Me Your Hand"	Himself	Shannon K	

== Awards and nominations ==
Year	Award	Category	Work	Result
2008	Teen Choice Awards	Choice TV Breakout Star – Male	Gossip Girl	Nominated
2008	Teen Choice Awards	Choice TV – Villain	Gossip Girl	Won
2009	Teen Choice Awards	Choice TV – Villain	Gossip Girl	Won
2009	Young Hollywood Awards	Young Hollywood Breakthrough – Male	Gossip Girl	Won
2009	Young Hollywood Awards	Breakthrough Performance – Male	Himself	Won
2010	Teen Choice Awards	Choice TV – Villain	Gossip Girl	Nominated
2011	Teen Choice Awards	Choice TV – Villain	Gossip Girl	Nominated
2012	Teen Choice Awards	Choice TV Actor – Drama	Gossip Girl	Nominated
