= Niki (2024 film) =

2024 biopic directed by Céline Sallette

- Theatrical release poster
- Directed by: Céline Sallette
- Written by: Céline Sallette; Samuel Doux
- Starring: Charlotte Le Bon; John Robinson; Damien Bonnard; Judith Chemla; Radu Mihăileanu
- Cinematography: Victor Seguin
- Edited by: Clémence Diard
- Music by: Para One
- Production companies: Cinéfrance Studios; Wild Bunch
- Distributed by: Wild Bunch
- Release dates: 23 May 2024 (Cannes); 9 October 2024 (France)
- Running time: 98 minutes
- Country: France
- Languages: French; English
- Budget: $4.3 million
- Box office: $1.2 million

Niki is a 2024 French biographical drama film directed by Céline Sallette, in her directorial debut, starring Charlotte Le Bon as artist Niki de Saint Phalle.

The film had its world premiere at the Un Certain Regard section of the 2024 Cannes Film Festival, on 23 May 2024.

== Premise ==
Niki follows Niki de Saint Phalle (Le Bon) from her early days as a young mother and aspiring model in the United States during the time of McCarthyism and her escape to France, where she is haunted by memories of the past.

== Cast ==
- Charlotte Le Bon as Niki de Saint Phalle
- John Robinson as Harry Mathews
- Damien Bonnard as Jean Tinguely
- Judith Chemla as Eva Aeppli
- Radu Mihăileanu as Brâncuși

== Release ==
In 2023, Niki was acquired for international sales by Pulsar Content, who will debut the film during the Un Certain Regard section at the 2024 Cannes Film Festival on 23 May 2024. Variety reported in February 2024 that Pulsar had sold distribution rights to the film in several major territories.

== Reception ==
On the review aggregator website Rotten Tomatoes, 29% of 7 critics' reviews are positive.

== Awards and nominations ==
Award	Date of ceremony	Category	Recipient(s)	Result	Ref.
Cannes Film Festival	May 24, 2024	Un Certain Regard	Céline Sallette	Nominated	
Cannes Film Festival	May 25, 2024	Caméra d'Or	Céline Sallette	Nominated	
