= Bone in the Throat =

- Official film poster
- Directed by: Graham Henman
- Screenplay by: Graham Henman; Mark Townend
- Based on: Bone in the Throat by Anthony Bourdain
- Produced by: Jamie Donaldson; Maggie Monteith; Lenny Beckerman; Nick Thurlow
- Starring: Ed Westwick; Tom Wilkinson; Andy Nyman; Vanessa Kirby; Rupert Graves; John Hannah
- Cinematography: Felix Wiedermann
- Edited by: Gabriel Wrye; Peter Oliver
- Music by: Lorne Balfe
- Production companies: Upload Films; Hello and Company; Dignity Film Finance
- Release date: March 14, 2015 (SXSW)
- Running time: 93 minutes
- Countries: United Kingdom; United States
- Language: English

Bone in the Throat is a 2015 British-American crime drama film directed by Graham Henman with a screenplay by Henman and Mark Townend based on the novel of the same name by Anthony Bourdain. The film stars Ed Westwick, Tom Wilkinson, Andy Nyman, Vanessa Kirby, Rupert Graves and John Hannah. The film premiered at the South by Southwest Film Festival on March 14, 2015.

== Premise ==
A young, ambitious chef is mixed up with the East End London mob. While showing off his culinary skills, he finds himself trapped as a witness to a murder in his own kitchen.

== Cast ==
- Ed Westwick as Will Reeves
- Tom Wilkinson as Charlie
- Andy Nyman as Ronnie the Rug
- Vanessa Kirby as Sophie
- Rupert Graves as Rupert
- John Hannah as Sullivan
- Neil Maskell as Lewis
- Steven Mackintosh as McDougal
- Tim Plester as Skinny
- Xavier Laurent as Chef Stephane

== Production ==
New Line Cinema had originally optioned the novel in 1997, hiring Ted Demme to produce and possibly direct. Stephen Susco and John Weidner were also hired to adapt the novel. Graham Henman would be hired to make his directorial debut on the film in June 1998.

After screen rights lapsed at New Line, producer Lenny Beckerman would later acquire the novel for Dignity Film Finance in May 2012. Henman remained on board as director, while also co-writing a new script with Mark Townend. Bourdain is executive producer for the project. Ed Westwick was cast in the lead role on May 6, 2013.
