= Boneyard (film) =

American crime thriller film

- Theatrical release poster
- Directed by: Asif Akbar
- Screenplay by: Vincent E. McDaniel; Asif Akbar; Hank Byrd; Koji Steven Sakai
- Story by: Vincent E. McDaniel
- Produced by: Colin Bates; Tamas Nadas; Asif Akbar; Vincent E. McDaniel; Marc Danon; Roy Scott MacFarland
- Starring: Mel Gibson; Curtis Jackson; Brian Van Holt; Nora Zehetner; Gabrielle Haugh; Weston Cage; Spice Williams-Crosby; Gail O'Grady
- Cinematography: Joshua Reis
- Edited by: R.J. Cooper
- Music by: Andrew Morgan Smith
- Production companies: Flix Financial; Avail Entertainment; Busy Day Productions; Dream Team Productions; FilmLens
- Distributed by: Lionsgate
- Release date: July 5, 2024
- Running time: 97 minutes
- Country: United States
- Language: English

Boneyard is a 2024 American crime thriller film directed by Asif Akbar, produced by Colin Bates, Asif Akbar, and Vincent E. McDaniel, and starring Mel Gibson and 50 Cent. It is based on the West Mesa murders.

The film was released on video on demand on July 2, and was released in select theaters in the United States on July 5, 2024.

== Plot ==
An FBI agent and the Chief of Police in Albuquerque are on the hunt for a serial killer known as 'The Bone Collector', but the chief fears that the killer is actually one of his own officers.

== Cast ==
- Mel Gibson as FBI Agent Petrovick
- Curtis Jackson as Chief Carter
- Brian Van Holt as Detective Ortega
- Nora Zehetner as Detective Young
- Gabrielle Haugh as Selena
- Weston Cage as Caesar Monto
- Spice Williams-Crosby as Diane Cross
- Gail O'Grady as FBI Special Agent Womack

== Production ==
Colin Bates produced along with Marc Danon, Scott Macfarland, Asif Akbar, Vincent E. McDaniel and Tamas Nadas. The film is based on the true crime events of the serial killer known as the Bone Collector. It is directed by Asif Akbar who also wrote the script with Vincent E. McDaniel, Hank Byrd, and Koji Steven Sakai, from a story by Vincent E. McDaniel. The film is based on the true life events of the West Mesa murders.

Principal photography began in Las Vegas in 2023. The film was distributed by Lionsgate.

== Release ==
Boneyard was released on video on demand on July 2, and in select theaters in the United States on July 5, 2024.

== Reception ==
On the review aggregator website Rotten Tomatoes, Boneyard holds an approval rating of 44% from 9 reviews.
