= Jade Michaels =

Fictional character from Days of Our Lives

- Days of Our Lives character
- Jade Searcy as Jade Michaels (2016)
- Portrayed by: Paige Searcy (2016–17); Gabrielle Haugh (2017)
- Duration: 2016–17
- First appearance: February 22, 2016
- Last appearance: July 14, 2017
- Created by: Josh Griffith, Dena Higley and Beth Milstein
- Introduced by: Ken Corday, Albert Alarr and Greg Meng
In-universe information
- Occupation: Student
- Father: Hal Michaels
- Aunts: Simone Michaels

Jade Michaels is a fictional character from the American soap opera Days of Our Lives. She was initially portrayed by Paige Searcy, who made her debut on February 22, 2016. Searcy later chose to vacate the role to focus on her education and her final appearance aired in January 2017. The role was recast to Gabrielle Haugh, whose first appearance as Jade aired on January 17, 2017, and her final appearance aired on July 14, 2017. Jade was introduced as a love interest of Joey Johnson (James Lastovic) and her initial storylines see him confesses to killing Ava Vitali (Tamara Braun) and the pair run away to a commune, which leads to Joey being shot. Jade later reveals that she is pregnant with Joey's baby but she miscarries, and after Joey breaks up with her, she tries to win him back by purposely overdosing on pills. Jade's relationship with her father, Hal Michaels (Réal Andrews), was also explored. Jade later tries to get revenge on Joey's mother Kayla Brady (Mary Beth Evans) when she stops paying her rent and also leaks a sex tape of Theo Carver (Kyler Pettis) and Claire Brady (Olivia Rose Keegan) in an attempt to get Claire famous. Haugh liked exploring Jade's darker side as she felt that she had a very different life experience to her. For her role as Jade, Searcy was pre-nominated twice for a Daytime Emmy Award for Outstanding Younger Actress in a Drama Series. Despite this, Jade has received criticism from viewers and critics and a poll from Soap Hub showed that 95% of voters were happy that the character left.

== Casting ==
Jade was initially played by Paige Searcy, and her first appearance aired on February 22, 2016. Searcy was meant to travel to Canada to appear in another role but her expedited passport did not arrive on time, but she later found the role of Jade, which she said "absolutely paid off". Speaking of her audition, the actress revealed, "I remember the day I got the audition for the role of Jade on Days of Our Lives; I was expected to learn my lines the night before and meet the amazing casting director Marnie Saitta the next morning. She saw something in me that she was proud to present to producers who loved my audition, call back, and chemistry read with James Lastovic."

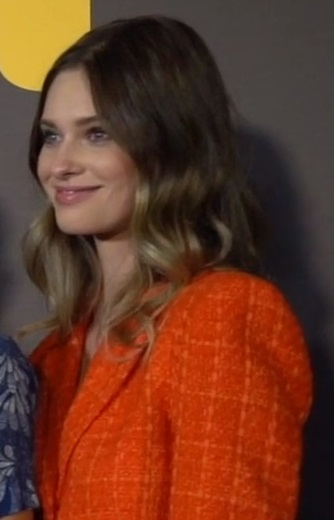
Gabrielle Haugh was the second actress to play Jade

In late 2016, it was reported that Searcy had chosen to leave the role, with her final appearance airing in January 2017. It was reported that Searcy had chosen to focus on her education and attend California Institute of the Arts, but then accepted a movie role and thus put her education on hold. James Lastovic, who played Joey Johnson, said he was very sad to see Searcy leave, explaining, "I think she did a phenomenal job with Jade. She brought something very unique to Jade. It was really fun to watch her and really fun to work with her." Although it was initially unconfirmed whether the character would be written out or recast, it was later reported by Soap Opera Digest in December 2016 that the role had been recast with model and actress Gabrielle Haugh, whose first appearance as Jade aired on January 17, 2017.

Haugh screen-tested with Lastovic, which she said was good and commented that Lastovic was easy to read with. Lastovic did chemistry reads with four actresses who were auditioning for Jade and commented that Haugh stood out, adding, "we easily knew who the choice was". Jade was described as being a "troubled girl who means well" and an "adrenaline junkie" to Haugh. Haugh did not feel nervous about being a recast as she was told that she did not need to be like Searcy, explaining, "They expected me to add my own twist to the character and not play Jade exactly like she did." Speaking about her first day, Haugh revealed, "I remember James and Mary Beth trying to run lines with me, but they kept getting called to the set. It was one of those moments where they had five scenes in a row and were really busy. It was funny. They were like, 'Well, welcome to soaps.'" Haugh did not decorate her dressing room at all, and revealed that it had a couch, mirror and table in it. She believed that she had worked with most of the Days of Our Lives current cast, particularly as the wedding of Steve Johnson and Kayla Brady (Stephen Nichols and Mary Beth Evans) involved most of the cast. Haugh had not watched the soap before cast in it and when she secured the role in the middle of 2016, she had to keep quiet about her casting due to the soap filming far in advance; when her first episode aired, she got several messages from people that she was not aware watched the soap. Of being a recast for Searcy, Haugh explained:

"I didn't have much time to go back and watch all the episodes that [Searcy] was in. They sent me some information on Jade and gave me the lowdown on her, and I talked to James [Lastovic] and Mary Beth [Evans] a lot to really work on the story so I knew where I was coming in. It's tough to come in when your character's already lived through all this stuff and you just have to pick it up, but they were very helpful with that because I would have been lost".

Haugh liked exploring the darker sides to Jade as she had different experiences to the character, explaining, "I've been so lucky with my life [...] I haven't struggled the way Jade has. That's definitely something fun to work with because I don't have things to relate to." The actress found working on the soap fun and hard work, explaining that the team film a lot each day; she added, "Everyone's constantly running around and running lines. They're amazing here, and everyone's always willing to help. I can say for a fact that I'm taking away an insane ability to memorize dialogue, and I've done a lot of emotional work. I've learned a lot as far as acting in ways that I hadn't previously." She would hang out with Lastovic often on set and they became good friends, and they would do stuff together as they lived close to each other. Haugh later exited the role and her final appearance as Jade aired on July 14, 2017.

== Development ==
Jade was introduced as a love interest of Joey Johnson (James Lastovic), and both characters were part of Days of Our Lives's new teen scene and attend Salem High School. Searcy enjoyed working with Lastovic and said that he was her favourite on the soap; Lastovic attended Searcy's high-school graduation, with Searcy saying that the pair had "come a long way since we first started working on the show together". Jade and Joey are teenage lovers, and Jade finds that he supposedly killed Ava Vitali (Tamara Braun). Jade convinces Joey to keep quiet about it and is attracted to his sense of danger. Joey is about to about to break up with Jade – even getting his relative Claire Brady (Olivia Rose Keegan) to help make Jade realize the relationship is finished – until Jade reveals that she is pregnant, which brings the couple closer together, and they eventually become excited about becoming parents. Lastovic noted how teenage pregnancy was a issue that affected people in real life and believed that Joey is not ready to be a father. During Jade's pregnancy, Jade shows a "sweeter" side to her personality, which attracts Joey more. Jade also sees her pregnancy as an "easy street with the Johnsons" and Joey's mother Kayla Brady (Mary Beth Evans) is very compassionate towards her. However, Jade has a miscarriage, and she initially reject Joey's attempts to comfort her. It is revealed that Jade got pregnant on purpose by not using birth control in order to "trap" Joey into staying with her. Jade also encourages Joey to distance himself from his parents and to commit robbery to prove that he loves her. After the end of their relationship, Joey goes on a date with a girl but Jade sabotages it.

There was a scene that Haugh filmed with Lastovic that the actress found "nerve-wracking" as the director made it clear to the actors that the scene was intended to be overly-dramatic, with Haugh revealing, "It ended with a kiss, and we were told to kiss left. James and I both kiss [tilting our heads] right, normally. It was a huge dramatic scene and we were trying not to bump heads in the middle of it." Réal Andrews, who had appeared in other American soap operas, was cast as Jade's father, Hal Michaels. A "dramatic" scene that Haugh filmed with Andrews was Haugh's favourite; she explained that Jade "was upset with him because he'd done something stupid. I basically freak out on him. It was really fun to do." In the soap, Jade is kicked out by her parents after she causes trouble, and she ends up running to her aunt's commune. Later on in Jade's storylines, she decides to live with her mother to help with the clear out of her dead grandmother's cottage.

Jade realises that Joey was only there for her when she was in need and whilst recovering from surgery, she overdoses on a bunch of pain pills as she is desperate for Joey's attention. She collapses and Kayla insists that she has tests run, which leads to Kayla discovering that Jade abused her medication on purpose. Jade attempts to this again, but she is caught out as Kayla has given her placebo pills instead, and Joey decides to walk away to from Jade after she is exposed by Kayla. Jade later lives with Joey's half-brother and Ava's son, Tripp Dalton (Lucas Adams). Jade lies to Tripp that Kayla was the one who killed Ava, Tripp's mother, and this leads to Tripp trying to ruin Kayla's career as revenge.

== Storylines ==
When Jade's schoolmate Joey Johnson (James Lastovic) tells her that he murdered Ava Vitali (Tamara Braun), he is surprised that she still wants to be around him. Joey and Jade start dating and she supports him through the trial of his father, Steve Johnson (Stephen Nichols), who has been accused of murdering Ava; when Steve is acquitted, she promises him that she will not reveal Joey's crime. After Jade and Joey both falls out with their respective parents, the teenagers agree to run away. They have sex and at prom, they vandalise the car of Mark McNair Connor Weil) as revenge for supposedly sabotaging the projector to show embarassing photos of their schoolmates Theo Carver (Kyler Pettis) and Ciara Brady (Vivian Jovanni). The teens are arrested for vandalism and spend the night in jail, and Jade is subsequently kicked out by her parents.

Jade and Joey run away to a commune owned by Jade's aunt, Simone Michaels (Siena Goines). Joey gets jealous when Jade talks to her friend Dirk (Reiley McClendon) and Jade reveals she was testing Joey. Joey is uncomfortable with committing burglary like some of the other commune members and wants to leave the commune, but Jade convinces him to stay. She challenges Joey to rob a souvenir store but snaps at him to leave her when he says he expresses concerns about his parents. The police come to the commune due to the robberies and Joey tries to protect Jade. After Joey is shot by Dirk when the latter takes the commune hostage, a devastated Jade turns her back on her aunt and her commune and returns to Salem with Joey. Jade and Joey resume their relationship and Jade reveals she is pregnant and pressures Joey to look after her and the baby as she has been kicked out by her parents for being pregnant. Jade is confronted by her father Hal Michaels (Réal Andrews) for stealing money from him and Jade's mother and Jade returns it. Hal disowns Jade, which devastates her. Jade has a miscarriage and gets extremely depressed, which is made worse when Joey breaks up with her.

Despite initial reluctance, Jade donates her liver to Hal, who is in the hospital, but his body rejects it and he takes Joey's mother Kayla Brady (Mary Beth Evans) hostage out of fear. Jade is able to talk Hal down and save Kayla. Jade moves in with Joey, Ciara and Claire Brady (Olivia Rose Keegan) and her rent is paid by Kayla and Steve. Jade tries to get Joey back and purposely overdoses on her medication for this, but Kayla exposes her scheme by giving her placebo pills instead. Jade's mother reaches out and offers to pay her rent, but Jade refuses as she feels that her mother is trying to buy her off. Kayla encounters Jade's mother and Kayla stops paying Jade's rent as she feels she is being taken advantage of. Angry at Kayla for cutting her off, Jade moves in with Ava and Steve's son Tripp Dalton (Lucas Adams) and lies to him that Kayla murdered Ava, and urges him to get revenge on her. Joey later finds out the truth about Joey being the real culprit. Wanting to help Claire get famous, Jade leaks a sex tape of Claire and Theo, which infuriates Claire. Jade decides to leave town as things are not going well for her there.

== Reception ==
For her role as Jade, Searcy was pre-nominated for Daytime Emmy Award for Outstanding Younger Actress in a Drama Series at the 2017 44th Daytime Emmy Awards. She was pre-nominated for the same award at the 2018 45th Daytime Emmy Awards.

When it was announced that Searcy would be leaving the role, a writer from Soap Hub speculated that Jade's pregnant could have been a "ruse after all"; they also opined that Searcy "blew into Salem with plenty of drama" as Jade. Hope Campbell from Soap Hub praised Searcy's "riveting performance" when Jade lost her baby and noted that Haugh would be "walking right into an emotionally riveting story of teen pregnancy and loss" as she takes over the role. Janet Di Lauro from the same website reported how a poll on their website showed that 79% of voters believed that Jade and Joey would split up quickly after Jade's miscarriage, whilst 12% thought that they would stay together and another 10% thought it was too soon to predict. Di Lauro also wrote, "While many [viewers] weren't originally a fan of Jade and thought that Joey deserved better, you came to like her during her short-lived pregnancy. She softened and showed her sweeter side; a side that Joey instantly gravitated towards." She also added that Jade and Joey had gotten "caught up in a happily-ever-after, fairytale future" before the miscarriage.

Tony and Laurisa from Soap Central believed that Joy Wesley should have been the fifth member of the Days of Our Lives teen scene rather than Jade. Kambra Clifford from the same website opined that "Drama, drama, drama has been the name of the game" since Jade "blew" into the soap. Michael Fairman from Michael Fairman TV called Jade "Joey's preggars and unappreciative girlfriend". Taylor Rios from The Inquisitr opined that Jade was "definitely a bad girl" when she first appeared and that she convinced Joey to do "reckless things"; Rios also noted how Jade asks Joey to hold her whenever she is going through something. After Jade sabotaged Joey's date, Diane Brounstein from Soap Hub reported how a poll showed that 39% of voters believed that Joey would get revenge on Jade after everything that she put him through, whilst 39% believed he would just yell at her and 22% believed that he would not say anything due to fearing that Jade could expose his murder of Ava. Brounstein also noted that Jade was in Joey's "rearview mirror" after their breakup and noted that Jade did not "listen to reason" when Joey was about to break up with her and she got pregnant to "trap him". Christine Fix from Soaps She Knows called the character "Jade 'she'll thank me for it later' Michaels" when she leaked Claire's sex tape. Fix did not defend Jade for her action but felt "endeared" to her after Claire was absuive towards her.

Following Jade's exit, a writer from Soap Hub reported that a poll on their website showed that 95% of voters were happy about Jade leaving, which the writer found unsurprising. They wrote that "the character of Jade had little to no rooting value from the beginning. The two actresses who portrayed her are certainly likable — but the writing just didn't allow us to become invested in the character", as well as calling her pregnancy a plot device. They added that Jade's actions towards Joey did not make her endearing to viewers and that Joey's "often blatant indifference" to Jade made their scenes awkward to watch. They also called Jade an ingenue who "whined" a lot and opined that the only thing Jade had "going for her" was that she stood by Joey after he killed Ava; they added, "Good luck, Jade. You can only do better outside of Salem." Furthermore, they also believed that writers had tried to make viewers feel sorry for Jade by having Jade kicked out by her parents, and that Days of Our Lives had had stronger sets of teenagers in previous decades.
