= Louise Linton =

Scottish actress (born 1980)

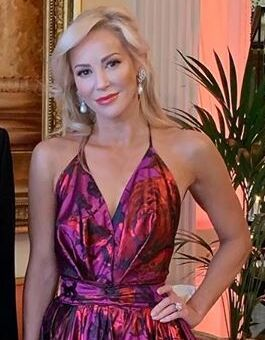
- Linton in 2019
- Born: Louise Hay; 20 December 1980 (age 45); Edinburgh, Scotland
- Education: London Academy of Music and Dramatic Art (CertHE); Pepperdine University (BA); University of West Los Angeles (JD)
- Occupations: actress, director, producer, writer, philanthropist
- Years active: 2006–present
- Spouses: Ronald Richards (m. 2006; div. 2009) Steven Mnuchin (m. 2017)
- Children: 1
- Website: louiselinton.com

Louise Linton (née Hay; born 20 December 1980) is a Scottish actress. She has appeared in the horror films Cabin Fever and Intruder, in minor roles in the television series CSI: NY and Cold Case, and wrote, directed, produced and starred in the 2021 film Me You Madness. Linton is married to Steven Mnuchin, the former United States Secretary of the Treasury.

== Early life ==
Linton was born in the Murrayfield area of Edinburgh, Scotland, the youngest of three children of William and Rachel Hay. Her family owns Melville Castle outside Edinburgh, where she used to spend weekends.

Linton was educated at St George's School for Girls and Fettes College. She was interested in acting from an early age; after observing students from Pepperdine University participating at the Edinburgh Festival, she vowed to her father that she would one day attend "Pepperdine and be an actress." She trained in Edinburgh with a private coach from the London Academy of Music and Dramatic Art, from which she gained an honours certificate after an exam.

Linton's mother died of breast cancer, aged 53, when Linton was 14 years old. After boarding school, Louise spent part of her gap year as a volunteer in northern Zambia, before attending university in the United States. Linton graduated with a bachelor's degree in journalism from Pepperdine University in 2005 and went on to earn a Juris Doctor degree from the University of West Los Angeles.

== Career ==
Linton has stated that she adopted her stage surname from her grandfather, partly to protect her family and partly to avoid confusion with the author Louise Hay.

Her first role was as a guest star in CSI: NY playing Simone de Lille, a French au pair to a New York teenager played by Shailene Woodley. The episode aired in 2007.

Her first film was 2007's Lions for Lambs, directed by Robert Redford, starring Tom Cruise and Meryl Streep, in which Linton played Miss M. In 2008, she portrayed Katie in the Roy Lee horror film The Echo. According to the film's director, Yam Laranas, Linton was not his first pick of actress but he agreed to give her the role because her then-husband Ronald Richards paid him $200,000. Her first lead role was in the sci-fi film Scavengers. In 2016, she appeared in Cabin Fever, a remake of the 2002 film of the same name and played the lead role of Elizabeth in the thriller Intruder. In 2009 Linton appeared in the Cold Case episode "WASP" in which she played Louise Patterson, a 1940's Women Air Force Service Pilot. She also appeared in the film Crew 2 Crew. Linton was featured in the 2003 reality TV series Hopelessly Rich.

In 2009, she was honoured at the Scottish Style Awards as the country's 'Most Stylish Woman’.

Linton posed for Maxim in 2009. Maxim dubbed her "the hottest thing to come out of Scotland since microwaved haggis.”

In interviews from 2009 to 2011, Linton recounted volunteering during her 1999 gap year in what she described as "war-torn Zambia", and the night she spent "hiding in the bush as Hutu rebels attacked the village she was working in". In 2016, she self-published her memoir about her experiences in Zambia, titled In Congo's Shadow, co-authored by Wendy Holden.

Louise was blessed and fortunate enough to be raised in a Scottish castle, and to not understand the reality of some human beings with a different background.

— Shona Hampel, longtime friend of Linton, March 2018 Elle profile

In February 2017, Linton succeeded her fiancé, Steven Mnuchin, as the interim CEO of Dune Entertainment. Mnuchin had founded Dune in 2004 but stepped down as part of his ethics agreement to divest his business roles in preparation for his appointment as Secretary of the Treasury. Linton publicly announced her new role in early May, which immediately drew the attention of Senator Ron Wyden (D-Oregon), a member of the Senate Finance Committee. Wyden questioned whether the appointment of Linton meant Mnuchin had fully divested from the company. Although the Treasury replied that she was serving in an uncompensated capacity, Linton resigned as interim CEO later in May.

Linton is involved in The Rockshiel Trust, a Scottish legal entity, which applied to develop townhouses and apartments in the upmarket area of Murrayfield in Edinburgh close to the Hay family's Edinburgh home. The plans for 9 Kinellan Road were objected to by the local community and the plans submitted to City of Edinburgh Council in January 2019 were later withdrawn.

Linton's production company Stormchaser Films acquired Serial Daters Anonymous and completed the film’s production and post production. Linton stars opposite Sam Page. The film has not yet been released.

In 2019, Linton wrote, directed, produced, financed, and starred in the feature film Me You Madness opposite Ed Westwick in which she plays a murderous, sex-addicted hedge fund manager. The movie was released on 12 February 2021.

In December 2023, the romantic comedy film Chick Flick was released, which Linton wrote, directed, produced, and stars in. The film is about a bride leaving her groom at the altar because he cheated, then “diving into the chaos of online dating and then having [her] misadventures go viral”.

== Other activities ==
=== Conservation shoe sales ===
In 2022, Linton began selling a line of leather-free stiletto heels under the brand "Linton". The cruelty-free and vegan brand uses environmentally sustainable packaging, donates to wildlife conservation efforts, and a tree is planted for each sale.

=== Animal welfare philanthropy ===
Linton is an animal welfare philanthropist who started a charitable organization focused on animal rights in 2019. In her role as a board member of the White Coat Waste Project, she co-hosted a briefing with Senator Susan Collins (R-Maine) in support of the Animal Freedom from Testing, Experiments, and Research Act (AFTER Act), which was thereafter sponsored by Collins and would require federal research facilities to assist with replacing animals used for testing.

=== Boards memberships, ambassadorships ===
Linton served on the board of Mattel Children's Hospital UCLA and the Old Fettesian's US Board of Trustees for Fettes College in Edinburgh. She was an ambassador for Erskine Wounded Warriors Scotland from 2010 to 2012, and is an ambassador for the Scottish Butterfly Trust for Cystic Fibrosis.

== Memoir ==
In 2016, she drew widespread criticism for her memoir. An excerpt from the memoir, published in The Telegraph, drew intense scrutiny, with many readers objecting to her portrayal of Zambia, as well as Linton's claim that she was a "central character" in the events.

"I tried not to think what the rebels would do to the 'skinny white Muzungu with long angel hair' if they found me." – Louise Linton in her memoir, In Congo's Shadow.

The Zambian High Commission in London and others criticised the book for its inaccuracies and promotion of the false narrative of "the white saviour". Her representative, Mike Sitrick, says she was targeted unfairly. "Had her critics checked," he stated, "they would have found that articles written contemporaneously with the events reported in Louise's book, by among the most respected media in the world, were consistent with Louise's reporting of those events, as was a United Nations High Commissioner for Refugees briefing in March 1999.”

Shortly after The Telegraph published its extract from the book, Linton withdrew her book from sale. She later apologised for causing offence and promised to donate all profits from the book to an appropriate charity, which she founded.The Telegraph withdrew the published extract and also apologised for any inaccuracies in Linton's text.

== Criticism ==
In August 2017, Linton was criticised for posting a photo on Instagram of herself accompanying her husband on a trip to Fort Knox on a United States government plane, using hashtags to highlight the designer clothing and accessories she wore. In her reply, she called the critic "adorably out of touch", and suggested that she contributed more to the US economy and paid more in taxes than the woman criticising her. Following extensive publicity, Linton apologised for both her initial post and her response to criticism released by her publicist, saying "it was inappropriate and highly insensitive". The couple reimbursed the government for the travel costs. Citizens for Responsibility and Ethics in Washington filed a Freedom of Information Act request for the authorisation and costs of the trip, noting the trip "seems to have been planned around the solar eclipse." Later, Linton said she was a "bozo" for the Instagram post.

The Treasury's Office of Inspector General reviewed the 2017 flight taken by Mnuchin and Linton. ABC News reported in September 2017 that the office had opened a second inquiry following reports that Mnuchin had requested use of a government jet to take him and Linton on their honeymoon in Scotland, France and Italy.

In November 2017, Linton and Mnuchin sparked a wave of mockery among social media users when they were photographed holding a sheet of dollar bills – the first to include Mnuchin's signature – at the Bureau of Engraving and Printing.

In January 2018, Linton was one of many celebrities, sports stars, journalists and politicians who were outed by The New York Times for allegedly purchasing fake followers – some of whom used information copied from real people – on various types of social media in order to overstate her following.

== Personal life ==
Linton was married to Los Angeles defence attorney Ronald Richards from 2006 to 2009.

Linton met Steven Mnuchin through mutual friends at a 2013 wedding reception in Los Angeles. The pair were engaged in 2015 after dating for two years. On 24 June 2017, Linton married Mnuchin. The civil ceremony, at which Vice President Mike Pence officiated, took place at the Andrew W. Mellon Auditorium in Washington, D.C. In 2023, she had a daughter with Mnuchin.

== Filmography ==
=== Film ===
Year	Title	Role	Notes
2007	Lions for Lambs	Miss M	
2008	The Echo	Katie	
2008	Banking on Love	Dina	
2008	Heineken Experience: Brew You	Woman	Short film
2010	Screwball: The Ted Whitfield Story	Shannon Storm	
2012	She Wants Me	Jessica	
2012	Crew 2 Crew	Samantha	
2013	The Power of Few	Corey's Mother	
2013	Scavengers	Emerson	
2014	Serial Daters Anonymous	Claire	
2016	Cabin Fever	Deputy Winston	
2016	Intruder	Elizabeth	Also producer
2016	The Midnight Man	Annie Luster	
2016	Rules Don't Apply	Betty	
2017	Odious	—N/a	Executive producer
2017	6 Below: Miracle on the Mountain	—N/a	Executive producer
2021	Me You Madness	Catherine Black	Also writer, director, and producer
2022	Escape the Field	—N/a	Executive producer
2023	Chick Flick	Claire	Also writer, director, and a producer
2023	Out of Hand	Dr. Valerie Cross	
2023	Dead Man's Hand	—N/a	Producer

=== Television ===
Year	Title	Role	Notes
2007	The Daily Habit	Amy	2 episodes
2007	CSI: NY	Simone de Lille	Episode: "A Daze of Wine and Roaches"
2009	Cold Case	Louise Patterson '44	Episode: "WASP"
2011	William & Kate: The Movie	Vanessa Rose Bellows	Television film
2012	A Smile as Big as the Moon	Julie	Television film
