= The Girl in the Pool =

- Poster
- Directed by: Dakota Gorman
- Written by: Jackson Reid Williams
- Produced by: Larry Greenberg; German Michael Torres; RJ Collins; Eric Brenner
- Starring: Freddie Prinze Jr. Monica Potter; Kevin Pollak
- Cinematography: Alonso Homs
- Edited by: Rob Bonz
- Music by: Adam Bosarge
- Distributed by: Quiver Distribution
- Release date: July 26, 2024
- Running time: 89 minutes
- Country: United States
- Language: English

The Girl in the Pool is a 2024 American mystery thriller drama film written by Jackson Reid Williams, directed by Dakota Gorman and starring Freddie Prinze Jr., Monica Potter and Kevin Pollak.

== Plot ==
Thomas is a suburban husband and father living a seemingly perfect life with his wife Kristen and their two adult children, Alex and Rose. On his birthday, Thomas invites his much younger mistress, Hannah, to his home while his family is away.

During their time by the pool, Thomas is momentarily distracted by a neighbor’s drone hovering nearby. When he returns his attention to the pool, he finds Hannah floating lifeless in the water. In a panic, he pulls her body from the pool and hides it in a storage bin near the deck.

Moments later, Kristen and the children arrive to throw Thomas a surprise birthday party. As guests begin to gather, including Thomas’s father-in-law William and Hannah’s husband Kevin, Thomas struggles to maintain his composure and keep the body hidden.

Throughout the party, flashbacks gradually reveal that it was Alex who killed Hannah. He had returned home unexpectedly, discovered the affair, and, overwhelmed with rage, struck Hannah with a blunt object. Thomas discovered the body and decided to cover up the crime to protect his son.

As tensions rise and suspicions grow—especially from William—Thomas is forced to confront the consequences of his actions. In the end, Alex confesses, but Thomas takes responsibility, choosing to shield his son from the fallout. The film ends with Thomas being taken away by the police, leaving the family to deal with the emotional aftermath.

== Cast ==
- Freddie Prinze Jr. as Thomas
- Monica Potter as Kristen
- Gabrielle Haugh as Hannah
- Brielle Barbusca as Rose
- Tyler Lawrence Gray as Alex
- Kevin Pollak as William
- Jaylen Moore as Randall
- Michael Sirow as Mike
- Rushi Kota as Kevin

== Release ==
The film was released on July 26, 2024.

== Reception ==
The film has a 43% rating on Rotten Tomatoes based on seven reviews. Marya E. Gates of RogerEbert.com awarded the film two and a half stars out of four. Tyler Doupe of Dread Central awarded the film 2.75 stars out of five.

Courtney Howard of Variety gave the film a positive review and wrote, "Regardless of whether we’re supposed to chuckle at our hero’s crumbling sanity or empathize with his strife, it’s empty-calorie viewing designed for viewers to either mock or embrace its hijinks."
