= Jessica Dominguez =

American lawyer

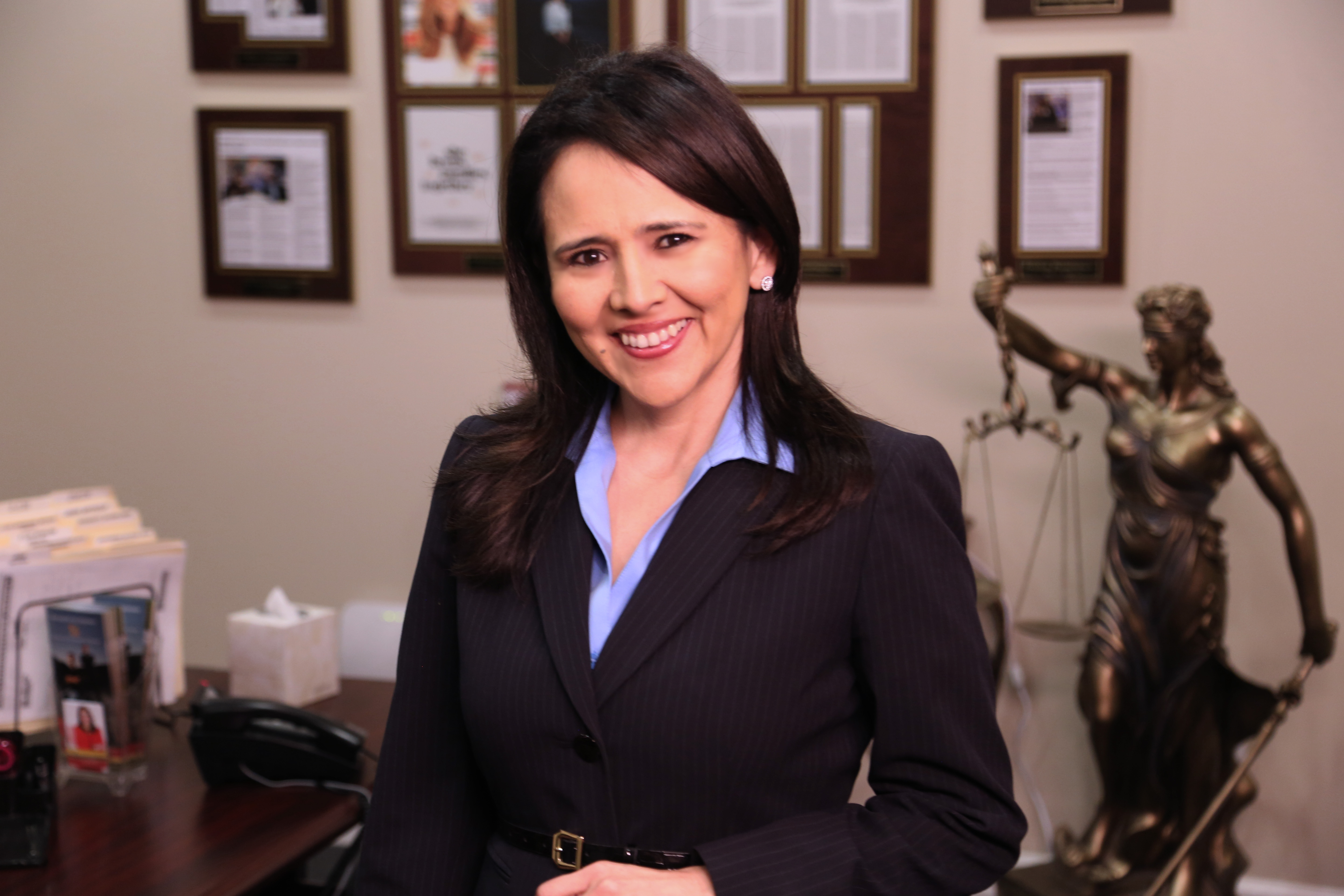
- Education: Pepperdine University; La Verne College of Law (JD)
- Occupations: Attorney, television & radio personality
- Spouse: Javier Dominguez
- Website: www.jessicadominguez.com

Jessica Dominguez is an immigration lawyer based in Studio City, California. She is a radio and television presenter. Between 2012 and 2013 she hosted the radio program Pregúntale a la Abogada (Ask the Attorney) on Univision America Radio. Currently she hosts the weekly television immigration "Ángel de la Justicia" on Univision's ¡Despierta América! and also appears on Primer Impacto's immigration segments. She is an advocate for immigration reform and has given commentary on the topic for media outlets including The Los Angeles Times.

== Early life and education ==
Dominguez was born in Iquitos, Peru and raised in the Peru capital of Lima. When she was 14 years old, Dominguez moved to live with her mother who had left for the United States. She worked various jobs in local factories and she knew little of the English language and made it a goal to learn one new word per day.

In Los Angeles, Dominguez dropped out of high school to work low paying jobs. While working at a McDonald's, a regular customer offered her a position at an insurance agency, answering phones for Spanish-speaking clients. Dominguez married Javier Dominguez, a dental technician that she met through the insurance agency. She earned her GED while attending night school while she was a stay-at-home mom.

Dominguez attended Pierce College and completed her undergraduate degree at Pepperdine University, graduating in 1996. She went on to attend the University of La Verne College of Law where the former dean of the law school hired her as a law clerk. She graduated with her J.D. in 2000.

== Career ==
Dominguez started her career with a focus on family law but quickly moved to concentrating on immigration law. She became a volunteer for the Los Angeles County Bar Association Immigration Legal Assistance Project (ILAP). She began working for an immigration law firm where she represented Spanish-speaking clients. In 2002 she founded the Law Offices of Jessica Dominguez, which were then located in Canoga Park, California. In recent years she began using social media to educate members of the community about their rights under immigration law. She has become known for her use of social media in the field of law, using it as a medium that has traditionally not been used by attorneys.

One of the first notable cases handled by Dominguez was that of a Mexican woman who was sold as a sex slave when she was 16 years old. The woman witnessed a man's murder, which was carried out by a neighbor. The neighbor instructed her to hide the weapon and she was later accused of murder. After serving 22 years in prison, she was ordered deported. Dominguez organized a team of supporters – that included Marta Sahagún de Fox and Hilda Solis who was then a congresswoman – to fight for the release and oppose the deportation of the woman. The case drew international attention and the woman was quoted as saying "she is my angel," which ran in a story in La Opinión, leading to Dominguez being known as "el angel de la justicia" (The Angel of Justice).

Dominguez represented many families who were victims in the 2012 Miramonte Elementary School abuse scandal. The school had a high enrollment of poor Latino families, some of which were in the country without documents. The teacher at the school pleaded no contest to numerous sex crimes and was sentenced to 25 years in prison. Dominguez represented families of victims who were scared to come forward for fear of deportation. Dominguez requested assurance that families would not be deported after coming forward. She also represented 8 of the victimized families in a civil lawsuit against the school district.

Early in her career, Dominguez attended an immigration workshop in Los Angeles where a broadcast reporter was looking for someone to immigration explain immigration law in Spanish. Dominguez completed the task which led to more television appearances. She was eventually asked to be a presenter for her own weekly segment "Ángel de la Justicia" on Univision's ¡Despierta América!, the highest rated morning show among Latinos in the United States. She also has regular appearances in segments on Primer Impacto. Dominguez has provided commentary for The Huffington Post, where she is also a contributor.
