= DarkGame =

British crime thriller film

- Directed by: Howard J Ford
- Screenplay by: Gary Grant; Niall Johnson
- Produced by: Tom George
- Starring: Ed Westwick
- Production company: Happy Hour Productions
- Distributed by: The Movie Partnership
- Release date: 2024
- Running time: 101 minutes
- Country: United Kingdom
- Language: English

DarkGame is a 2024 British crime thriller film directed by Howard J Ford and starring Ed Westwick.

== Premise ==
A killer live streams his murders on the Dark Web in the form of a twisted game show.

== Cast ==
- Ed Westwick as Ben Jacobs
- Rose Reynolds as Lisa Jacobs
- Andrew P. Stephen as The Presenter
- Natalya Tsvetkova as Katia
- Lola Wayne as Cathy
- Rory Alexander as Parker
- Joe Urquhart as Sam
- Anthony Ofoegbu as Captain Larson
- Marc Danbury as Agent Jackson
- Rick Yale as Larch

== Production ==
The film was written by Gary Grant and Niall Johnson and directed by Howard J Ford. Tom George was the producer for Happy Hour Productions. George showed the script to Ford who chose to direct the film because he described it as "cool thriller with a character that has the potential to give it a bit of heart, and it was also kind of noirish. I thought I could make something totally different to the other films I've done".

It starred Ed Westwick alongside Rose Reynolds, Andrew P Stephen, Natalya Tsvetkova, Lola Wayne, and Rory Alexander as well as Joe Urquhart, Anthony Ofoegbu and Marc Danbury.

Although set in Portland, Oregon, principal photography largely took place in Bristol, England. The film entered post-production in 2022.

== Release ==
The film had a limited theatrical release on 20 February 2024, and had a digital media release on 21 October 2024.
