= Seraphim Falls =

2006 American film

- Theatrical release poster
- Directed by: David Von Ancken
- Written by: David Von Ancken; Abby Everett Jaques
- Produced by: Bruce Davey; David Flynn; John Limotte; Stan Wlodkowski
- Starring: Liam Neeson; Pierce Brosnan; Michael Wincott; Ed Lauter; Xander Berkeley; Tom Noonan; Kevin J. O'Connor; John Robinson; Anjelica Huston
- Cinematography: John Toll
- Edited by: Conrad Buff
- Music by: Harry Gregson-Williams
- Production company: Icon Productions
- Distributed by: Samuel Goldwyn Films; Destination Films
- Release dates: September 13, 2006 (TIFF); January 26, 2007 (United States)
- Running time: 115 minutes
- Country: United States
- Language: English
- Budget: $18 million
- Box office: $1.2 million

Seraphim Falls is a 2006 American revisionist Western film directed by television producer and director David Von Ancken in his only feature film, and written by Von Ancken and Abby Everett Jaques. The story focuses on a bounty hunt for a Union soldier by a Confederate colonel following the American Civil War in the late 1860s. Pierce Brosnan, Liam Neeson, Michael Wincott, Tom Noonan, and Ed Lauter star. Seraphim Falls explores civil topics, such as violence, human survival and war.

The film was produced by Icon Productions. It was released by Samuel Goldwyn Films and Destination Films theatrically, and by Sony Pictures Home Entertainment for home media. The film score was composed by Harry Gregson-Williams.

Seraphim Falls premiered at the 2006 Toronto International Film Festival and was released to theatres in limited release in the United States on January 26, 2007, grossing $418,296 in domestic ticket sales. It earned an additional $801,762 overseas for a combined worldwide total of $1,220,058. The film generally received positive critical reviews.

Notable similarities have been found between the film and the 1976 revisionist western, The Outlaw Josey Wales directed by Clint Eastwood.

== Plot ==
In 1868, within the Ruby Mountains, Gideon roasts hare over an open fire. Gunshots ring out and he is shot in the left arm. He grabs what he can and races down the mountain. His attackers emerge to inspect his campsite. Colonel Morsman Carver, a former Confederate officer, is accompanied by Pope, Hayes, Parsons and the Kid. Carver has hired the others to hunt down Gideon.

Gideon removes the bullet with a Bowie knife while hiding from Carver. Leaving a fire burning to attract the posse, he kills Pope with his knife then ventures into the wilderness again. When Gideon attempts to steal a horse from a ranch, a young woman named Charlotte catches him. She then helps him after seeing he is injured, dressing his wound and her family let him sleep overnight in their cabin. He buys their horse and leaves before daybreak.

Carver's posse interrogates the ranch family, and upon finding Gideon's gold coins are about to conclude that they sold him a horse when the rancher's son Nathaniel confesses that he stole the coins while Gideon slept.

As the group of men approach Gideon's trail, he ambushes them with a bear trap impaling the Kid, whom Carver then shoots out of mercy. Later, discovering a dead bank robber Gideon had killed earlier in self-defense, Parsons leaves the others as the dead man's bounty exceeds what Carver is offering to capture Gideon. As Parsons is preparing to load the body onto a horse to take it to Carson City for the reward, Carver shoots the horse – which he declares is his – leaving Parsons to walk the 30 miles back to town carrying the body.

Coming across a railroad under construction, Gideon hitches his horse and steals food. The foreman recognizes the horse as stolen and detains him. Carver and his remaining man, Hayes, also reach the railroad site and search for Gideon. Meanwhile, he escapes, stealing another horse.

As Carver and Hayes draw closer, Gideon's horse collapses from the heat. Gideon euthanizes it by slitting its throat. When Carver and Hayes reach the horse's carcass, Hayes marvels at how Gideon disemboweled the horse. Gideon leaps out from within the horse's belly, and puts his knife to Hayes' neck, threatening to kill him if Carver does not give up his gun.

Carver instead shoots Hayes with his last bullet. Confronting each other, he and Gideon recall the events that put them at odds. After the end of the American Civil War, Gideon was ordered to track down former Confederate officers. When he arrived at Carver's home in Seraphim Falls to interrogate him, Carver was out in a nearby field.

To coerce Carver's wife into revealing his whereabouts, and believing their house was empty, Gideon orders their barn to be set on fire. A soldier searching the house carelessly knocks over a kerosene lantern. The blaze quickly spreads as Carver returns from the fields.

While the soldiers restrain him, his wife and son run into the house to save the infant inside. Both men look on with horror at the unfolding tragedy; trapped by the flames, Carver's wife and children perish. Gideon, racked with guilt, drops his gun belt and walks away from his men.

The two men fight, Gideon eventually getting the better of Carver. He points him towards a nearby town and tells him that he will get nothing but torment if he continues his pursuit. Gideon takes Carver and Hayes' horses and sets off deep into the desert.

Both men find a rare pool of water, guarded by the Indian Charon, who extracts dear payment from each so they might continue their journeys. Both are visited by the mystical Madame Louise, who offers them a Faustian bargain: to trade survival items (Gideon's horse, Carver's water) for something that will perpetuate their feud (a bullet for Gideon, a gun for Carver).

When Carver catches up with Gideon, both are on the brink of exhaustion and death. Confronting each other again with their pistols, Gideon wounds Carver. However, instead of killing him with his knife, he offers himself to him. Carver decides not to shoot him and throws his pistol aside. Gideon helps Carver to his feet and they walk in different directions into the distance. As a final gesture Gideon discards his knife (his weapon of choice throughout the film).

== Cast ==
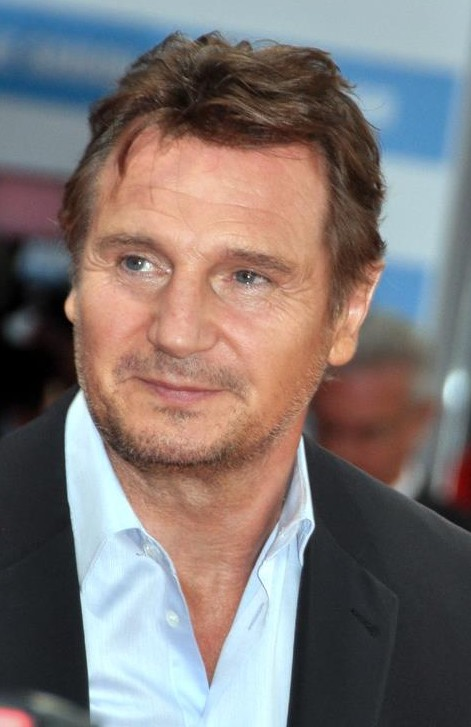
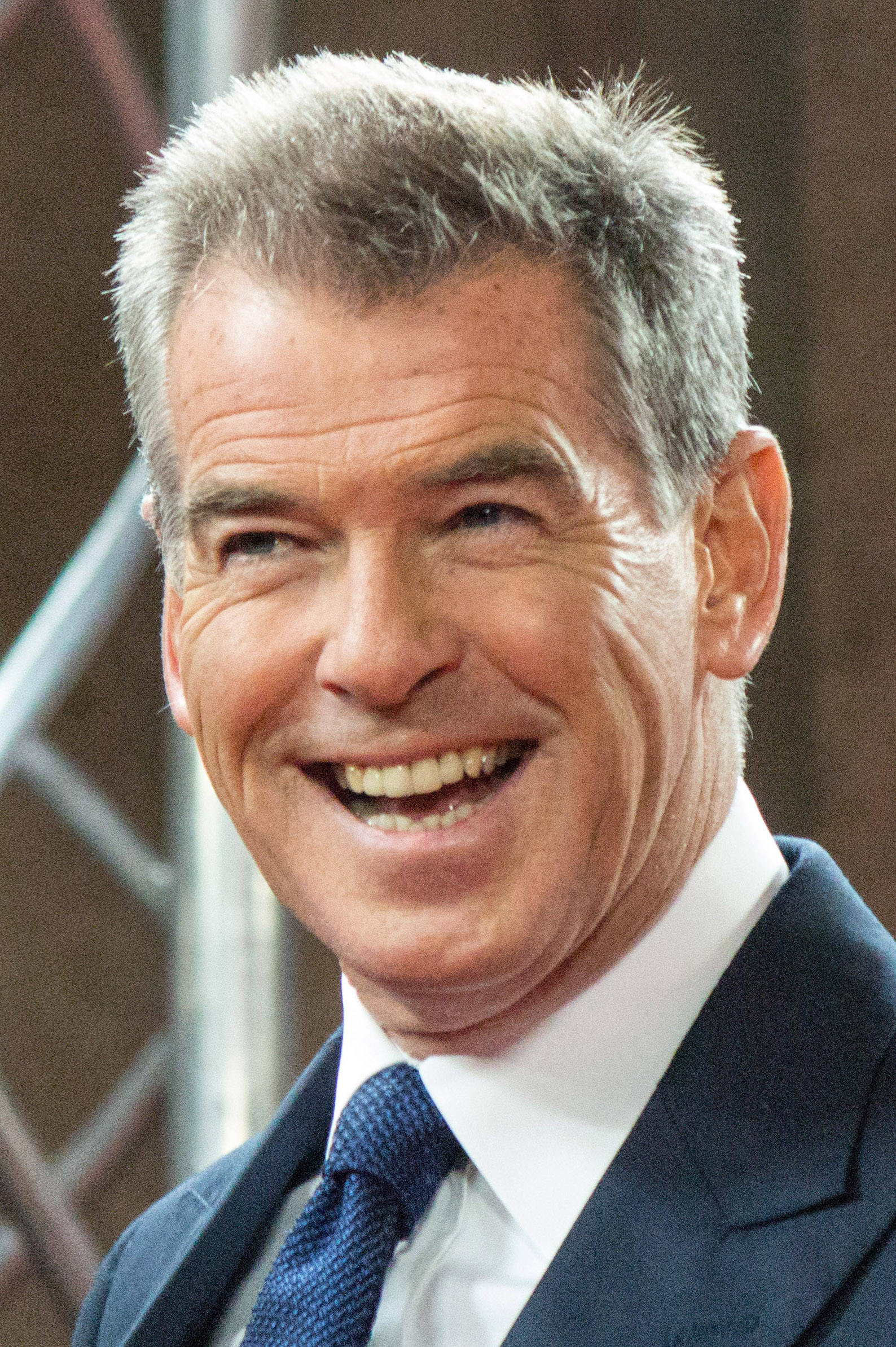
Liam Neeson (top, pictured in 2012) and Pierce Brosnan (pictured in 2014) portray Carver and Gideon, respectively
- Liam Neeson as Colonel Morsman Carver: Like Brosnan, Neeson described being "kind of steeped in that western mythology growing up in Ireland." He likened his character, Carver, to Captain Ahab in Moby-Dick, "he's [Carver] totally governed by this idea of revenge where he's practically lost his humanity."
- Pierce Brosnan as Gideon: The role was originally to be played by Richard Gere but after he dropped out, Pierce Brosnan replaced him. Brosnan spoke of his love of Western films during production and promotion of Seraphim Falls, which had stemmed from watching them as a child in Ireland.
- Michael Wincott as Hayes
- Xander Berkeley as McKenzy, a railway foreman.
- Ed Lauter as Parsons
- Tom Noonan as Minister Abraham
- Kevin J. O'Connor as Henry
- John Robinson as Kid
- Anjelica Huston as Madame Louise, a vanishing con artist (and possible religious allegory), who figures in the end of the film. Huston first joined the cast in November 2005.
- Angie Harmon as Rose
- Robert Baker as Pope
- Wes Studi as Charon
- Jimmi Simpson as Big Brother
- James Jordan as Little Brother
- Nate Mooney as Cousin Bill
- Shannon Zeller as Charlotte
- Adon Cravens as Nathaniel
- Boots Southerland as Tall Henchman

== Production ==
=== Filming ===
David Von Ancken first researched the script for six months before joining Abby Everett Jaques to create the screenplay. The film was originally announced at the Cannes Film Festival with Liam Neeson and Richard Gere in the lead roles. Gere dropped out in August 2005 and was soon replaced by Pierce Brosnan. Shooting on Seraphim Falls started on October 17, 2005 and actress Anjelica Huston later joined the cast the following November. The film was filmed on location for 48 days, primarily in New Mexico; some of the opening scenes were filmed along the McKenzie River, including at Sahalie Falls, in Oregon.

Oscar-winning cinematographer John Toll was responsible for cinematography work on the film. Toll later noted it was a "great opportunity to work with a director who was interested in visual storytelling."

=== Music ===
The soundtrack, composed by Harry Gregson-Williams, was produced at Bastyr University's chapel in Kenmore, Washington. Gregson-Williams wrote the music in three or four weeks, describing it as "very atmospheric". However, a CD soundtrack version of the film's score was never released to the public. The sound effects in the film were supervised by Kami Asgar. The mixing of the sound elements were orchestrated by William Sarokin and mastered by Steve Maslow.

== Reception ==
=== Box office ===
The film premiered in cinemas on January 26, 2007, in limited release throughout the U.S.. During its opening weekend, the film opened in a distant 42nd place grossing $155,560 in business showing at 52 locations. The comedy film, Epic Movie came in first place during that weekend grossing $18,612,544. The film's revenue dropped by 49% in its second week of release, earning $79,181. For that particular weekend, the film fell to 48th place screening in 48 theaters. The film The Messengers, unseated Epic Movie to open in first place grossing $14,713,321 in box office revenue. During its final weekend in release, Seraphim Falls opened in 73rd place with $10,526 in revenue. The film went on to top out domestically at $418,296 in total ticket sales through a 6-week theatrical run. Internationally, the film took in an additional $801,762 in box office business for a combined worldwide total of $1,220,058. For 2007 as a whole, the film would cumulatively rank at a box office performance position of 276.

=== Critical response ===
On Rotten Tomatoes, the film has an approval rating of 57%, based on reviews from 86 critics, with an average score of 5.7 out of 10. The website's consensus reads, "A brutal, slow-moving drama that unfolds among some great-looking scenery." On Metacritic, the film has a weighted average score of 62 out of 100, based on 21 reviews, indicating "generally favorable reviews".

Neeson, who has more presence doing nothing than most actors do playing Hamlet, gives Carver hints of a psycho drive beneath his righteous scowl.

— Owen Gleiberman, writing in Entertainment Weekly

Claudia Puig writing for USA Today thought the film was a "psychological drama with an intriguing ambiguity that challenges the viewer's loyalties and preconceived notions." Stephen Holden writing in The New York Times applauded the visuals, saying "Its strongest element is the austere majesty of the cinematography by John Toll ("Braveheart," "Legends of the Fall," "The Thin Red Line"), in which the severe beauty of the Western landscape looms over the characters as a silent rebuke." Writing for The Austin Chronicle, Josh Rosenblatt viewed it as "Meditative, beautifully shot, and blessed with a healthy dose of cynicism" and a "morality play without the morality and a Western Purgatorio that, in the end, demands its protagonists resign themselves to their loneliness and brutality and avail themselves of the redemptive power of sheer exhaustion." Author Joshua Rothkopf of Time Out commented it "has all the good looks of its wintry Oregon locales, not to mention the equally craggy faces of Liam Neeson and a grizzled-up Pierce Brosnan, embroiled in a Fugitive-like pursuit with the latter on the run." Peter Rainer of The Christian Science Monitor called it "essentially one long, bleak stalk-and-kill action thriller", adding "The film functions as a kind of survivalists' guide, and there's a morbid pleasure in seeing how Gideon extricates himself from one impossible situation after another."

When actors of Neeson and Brosnan's quality stoop to material so obviously beneath them, a lashing at least might be in order.

— Ruthe Stein, writing for the San Francisco Chronicle

In a mixed review, Christy Lemire mused about the lead characters: "Their climactic confrontation is visually arresting in its starkness. But as an anti-war statement, a call to lay down arms that's clearly intended to be relevant today, it's a bit too clunky in its literalism." She ultimately found the film to be "technically solid" but a "dramatically unremarkable Western". Todd McCarthy of Variety believed the film was "nothing rousing or new" and that Brosnan and Neeson wouldn't be enough "to muster more than modest theatrical B.O. for this very physical but familiar oater", but praised the cinematography, noting "Toll's work, which emphasizes the blues and greens of the forests, is always a pleasure to behold". Kevin Crust of the Los Angeles Times was critical of the ending: "A beautifully shot chase film [...] it moves along with minimalist efficiency before running out of gas during an overlong allegorical final section." Columnist Joe Morgenstern of The Wall Street Journal noted, "things take a turn from simplicity to sententiousness, then to surreal silliness, and finally to a mano-à-mano contest, on a parched desert floor, over which man gets the best close-ups."

Following its cinematic release in 2007, Seraphim Falls received a nomination from the Gotham Awards for the Breakthrough Director Award. In 2008, the film won the "Best Specialty Stunt" award from the Taurus World Stunt Awards for Mark Vanselow and Craig Hosking.

== Home media ==
The film was released on DVD in the United States on May 15, 2007. Currently, there are several European Blu-ray releases of the film, although it is also available in other media formats such as video on demand.

== See also ==
- List of Western films of the 2000s
