= The Crash (2017 film) =

- Theatrical release poster
- Directed by: Aram Rappaport
- Produced by: Aaron Becker; Atit Shah; Hilary Shor; Peter Shuldiner; Isaac LaMell
- Starring: Dianna Agron; Minnie Driver; Frank Grillo; John Leguizamo; Mary McCormack; Christopher McDonald; Maggie Q; AnnaSophia Robb; Ed Westwick
- Cinematography: Matt Turve
- Music by: Guy Moon
- Production companies: Windward Entertainment; Create Entertainment
- Distributed by: Vertical Entertainment
- Release date: January 13, 2017 (United States)
- Running time: 84 minutes
- Country: United States
- Language: English

The Crash is an American thriller film, written and directed by Aram Rappaport and produced by Aaron Becker, Isaac La Mell, Kristi Gescheidler, Atit Shah, Hilary Shor, and Peter Shuldiner. The film stars Minnie Driver, Frank Grillo, Dianna Agron, AnnaSophia Robb, Maggie Q, Mary McCormack, Ed Westwick, Christopher McDonald, and John Leguizamo.

The film had a direct-to-VOD and limited release on January 13, 2017, in North America.

== Plot ==
In the not-so-distant future, a team of white-collar criminals are enlisted by the federal government of the United States to thwart a cyberattack that threatens to bankrupt the United States.

== Cast ==
- Minnie Driver as Shannon Clifton
- Frank Grillo as Guy Clifton
- John Leguizamo as George Diebold
- Dianna Agron as Amelia Rhondart
- Mary McCormack as Sarah Schwab
- Christopher McDonald as Richard Del Banco
- Maggie Q as Nurse Hilary
- AnnaSophia Robb as Creason Clifton
- Ed Westwick as Ben Collins

== Production ==
=== Casting ===
On October 29, 2013, Variety announced that Frank Grillo and Minnie Driver will be starring in A Conspiracy on Jekyll Island as a married couple; Dianna Agron, John Leguizamo, Ed Westwick, and Maggie Q will be joining them. On November 25, 2013, Deadline Hollywood reported that AnnaSophia Robb will be portraying the duo's character cancer-stricken daughter. On December 2, 2014, Variety reported that Mary McCormack had been added to the ensemble. Rappaport admitted that Agron's character is a "total badass" and is one of the lead roles. Agron said that her character is "much more aggressive" than her past roles. On August 11, 2015, Rappaport and producer Atit Shah reported that the score, composed by Guy Moon, was being recorded by The Seattle Philharmonic Orchestra.

Ashton Kutcher was first offered the role of Guy Clifton and accepted the role pending he could shoot on weekends while filming "Two and a Half Men" but scheduling conflicts forced him to drop out. Lenny Kravitz accepted the role of Guy Clifton but was forced to drop out of the project because of promotions for The Hunger Games: Catching Fire. With Lenny Kravitz attached, Zoey Kravitz was going to play his daughter, but after he departed from the project negotiations with Zoey fell through. Frank Grillo eventually was cast as the lead after Helen Hunt suggested Minnie Driver play the role of Shannon. Serving as an executive producer, Frank Grillo rejected casting Bella Thorne as his daughter in the film as well as a Courtney Love cameo as Hillary Clinton. Dominic Cooper and Sean Combs were loosely attached to roles but eventually dropped out last minute.

At the 2016 People's Choice Awards held in Los Angeles on January 6, 2016, Ed Westwick – who had played the main antagonist, Chuck Bass, for five years on Gossip Girl – had this to say on how his fans will react to finally seeing him play a character with a solid sense of right and wrong, "It was different from anything I had done, that's always something that's going to make you attracted to a part," said Westwick. "The moral compass was also something that was interesting as well because after someone does something that's bad, how do they get back to a neutral place or a more positive place?" Westwick added that he's hoping fans enjoy seeing him in a new light.

=== Filming ===
Principal photography, beginning November 2013, took place in Chicago, Michigan, Indiana, New York City, Washington, D.C., London, and Paris.

== Release ==
The Crash had a limited release theatrically and is available digitally and on video on demand beginning January 13, 2017, in North America.

Internationally the film was released under the title Conspiracy in 2017.

== Reception ==
The film received prominently negative critic reviews, it holds a 17% "rotten" rating on Rotten Tomatoes based on 12 reviews, with an average rating of 3.67/10. The users' average rating is significantly higher at 71% positive. Metacritic reports a score of 28/100 based on 7 critics, generally unfavorable reviews".

Edward Douglas of Film Journal International called the movie "an entertaining film that tries to point out the flaws in the American financial system with a short running time that ensures it never wears out its welcome."
