= Gwen Van Dam =

American actress (1928–2024)

- Born: Gwendolyn Greta Van Dam; November 5, 1928; San Francisco, California, U.S.
- Died: December 19, 2024 (aged 96); Los Angeles, California, U.S.
- Occupation: Actress
- Notable work: Coming Home; Stir Crazy
- Spouse: Bill Smillie (m. 1959; died 2003)

Gwendolyn Greta Van Dam (November 5, 1928 – December 19, 2024) was an American character actress.

== Life and career ==
Van Dam was born in San Francisco, California, on November 5, 1928. In 1950, she graduated from San Jose State University with a B.A.

She appeared in the films Husbands (1970), The Kentucky Fried Movie (1977), Coming Home (1978), Joni (1980), Stir Crazy (1980), True Confessions (1981), Star Trek Generations (1994), and Me You Madness (2021).

Van Dam was married to actor Bill Smillie from October 1959 until his death in November 2003. She died in West Los Angeles on December 19, 2024, at the age of 96.
