= Steven Beckingham =

British actor and singer

- Born: 6 November 1978 (age 47); Frimley Green, Surrey, England, UK
- Occupations: Television actor, singer

Steven Beckingham is a British actor and singer who was born on 6 November 1978 in Frimley Green, Surrey, England, United Kingdom. He has appeared in a few films and TV series including Heartbeat and the Doctor Who episode Dalek. He is now an acting teacher at West Linn High School in Oregon.

== Biography ==
Both of his parents were born just outside London and they met each other while serving in the Royal Navy. Both were athletes, in and out of the Navy, his mother a swimmer and father a footballer. After visiting United States in the mid '80s, Beckingham and his family decided to emigrate to the Pacific Northwest. He started his acting career performing in various musicals in Portland, Oregon in the late '90s. He received a BA in Music from Pacific University in Forest Grove, Oregon where he was to eventually solidify his love for acting on stage.

Beckingham's first straight theatre role that hooked him was Sir Andrew Aguecheek in "Twelfth Night", for which he received a National College Theatre Foundation acting nomination. In 2002 he moved with his now wife, Sara, to London and studied at the London Academy of Music and Dramatic Art. Since then he has had the pleasure of acting on stage and screen. Most recently he has been fortunate enough to be involved with the Tony Award-winning and Evening Standard Award-winning Broadway production of "Who's Afraid of Virginia Woolf?" starring Kathleen Turner and Bill Irwin.

He understudied David Harbour in the role of "Nick" at the Apollo Theatre in London's West End and understudied David Furr in the same role on the U.S. National Tour of the production. Beckingham is also an avid composer and singer-songwriter.

== Filmography ==
Year	Title	Role	Notes
2005	I Shouldn't Be Alive	Rob Rusnak	Episode: "Shipwrecked"
2005	Doctor Who	Polkowski	Episode: "Dalek"
2005	Ian Fleming: Bondmaker	Robin Kinhead	
2005	La Tigre e la neve / The Tiger in the Snow	First Sergeant	
2006	The Road to Guantanamo	Camp X-Ray Guard No. 1	
2006	Hallo Panda	Mark	
2006	Heartbeat	Dale Cabot	Episode: "Intelligence Matters"
2009	Flick's Chicks	Art Student	
2012	Grimm	Tom Daniels	
2012	Leverage	Dad	Episode: "Organ Grinder"
2016	Intruder	David	
