= Gabrielle Haugh =

American model and actress

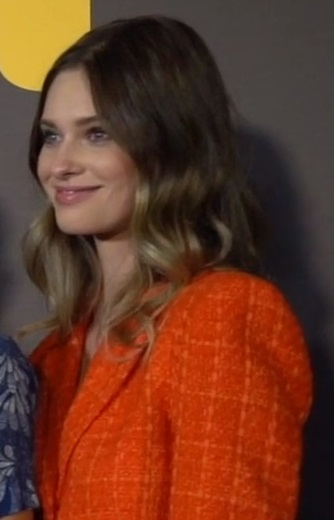
- Haugh from Runt Film Premiere, New York City 2021
- Born: Gabrielle Genevieve Haugh; Sacramento, California, U.S.
- Occupations: Actress, model
- Years active: 2015–present

Gabrielle Genevieve Haugh is an American model and actress who portrayed the role of Jade Michaels on the NBC soap opera Days of Our Lives.

== Early life ==
Haugh was born in Sacramento, California. Prior to moving to Los Angeles in 2014 upon turning 18, she studied theater, musical theater and dance during high school.

== Career ==
During her modeling days, she worked with clothing line Forever 21, Jeweliq and Bobi Los Angeles brand and publications like GEV Magazine. In 2015, she featured in the music video for The Dose's "Cold Hands." That same year, she made her film debut when she landed the role of Grace Blalock in The Long Home opposite actor James Franco. In 2016, Haugh landed her first lead role in The Midnight Man as Alex Luster, a girl who summons a creature who goes by the titular name. In December 2016, it was announced that she had joined the cast of NBC soap opera Days of Our Lives, replacing Paige Searcy as Jade Michaels, with her first appearance being January 17, just days after her 21st birthday. In June 2017, Soaps.com announced that, after six months and 34 episodes on Days, Haugh would depart in July.

Haugh took on a supporting role in the horror film Jeepers Creepers 3 and also appeared in the indie drama film The Long Home. She bagged a supporting role in the action film Fortress: Sniper's Eye, which was released on April 29, 2022.

In 2023, Haugh was cast in the action adventure film Dark Highway and had a supporting role in the sci-fi comedy-drama film Monsters of California.

In 2024, Haugh appeared crime thriller film Boneyard as Selena and appeared in the mystery thriller drama movie The Girl in the Pool.

== Personal life ==
Haugh is in a relationship with photographer Jason Agron, whom she met in 2014.

== Filmography ==
=== Film ===
Year	Title	Role	Notes
2016	The Midnight Man	Alex Luster	
2017	The Institute	Allison	
2017	Jeepers Creepers 3	Addison Brandon	
2018	The Long Home	Grace Blalock	Unreleased
2019	Against the Clock	Amelia	
2021	Ted Bundy: American Boogeyman	Laura Aime	
2022	Fortress: Sniper's Eye	Zoe	
2023	Dark Highway	Kennedy	
2023	Monsters of California	Kelly	
2024	Boneyard	Selena	
2024	The Girl in the Pool	Hannah	

=== Television ===
Year	Title	Role	Notes
2016	Mother, May I Sleep with Danger?	Vampire	TV film
2017	13 Reasons Why	Laura	2 episodes
2017	Days of Our Lives	Jade Michaels	Series regular (34 episodes)
2018	Grown-ish	Emily	Episode: "Starboy"
2019	Speechless	Tara	Episode: "R-O-- ROLL M-O-- MODEL"
