= Me You Madness =

- Official poster
- Directed by: Louise Linton
- Written by: Louise Linton
- Produced by: Louise Linton; Kristen Ruhlin
- Starring: Louise Linton; Ed Westwick
- Cinematography: Reinhart Peschke; Boa Simon
- Edited by: Samuel Means
- Music by: Max Aruj
- Production companies: Stormchaser Films; Endeavor Content; Highland Film Group
- Distributed by: STXfilms
- Release date: February 12, 2021
- Running time: 98 minutes
- Country: United States
- Language: English

Me You Madness is a 2021 American comedy thriller film, written, directed, produced by, and starring Louise Linton alongside Ed Westwick.

It was released on February 12, 2021, by STXfilms.

== Plot ==
Catherine Black, a wealthy and extremely intelligent corporate hedge fund manager and serial killer, has a high-fashion sense and spends her money on expensive cars, clothes, artwork, sports memorabilia, and furniture. She purposely lures Tyler Jones, a thief and gamer who steals from elderly individuals, including Black's grandmother, to apply for a job as a house sitter at her large home in Malibu. As he cases the home, Black roofies him to knock him out, and then gets her nails done. When Jones awakes, Black's girlfriend, Yu Yan arrives, and after feeding him the organs of a frat boy while mocking him in Mandarin, they engage in an evening of drugs, sex, and bonding.

Black, after killing a man who was making suggestive faces at her in an exercise session, comes home and orders Jones to leave her house. While she takes a shower he steals her car and jewelry. She analyzes the tracking device in Jones' car, calls him, and reads off the times and locations of recent thefts committed by him and his partner-in-crime, Chad. He brings the car and jewelry back in exchange for her not giving the Los Angeles police the incriminating evidence, but she explains that promises are meant to be broken. As they physically fight, and Jones runs from Black, he discovers her freezer full of human body parts, upping the stakes and forcing Black to vow to kill him even as it becomes obvious to both that they are madly in love.

Relaxing after their final series of fights, in which Black could have killed Jones by any of several methods, they simultaneously agree to marry. Black begins taking medication to control her need to kill, and Jones gives up a life of crime, finishes engineering school, and pays back Black's grandmother and his other victims. They have become vegans with Yu Yan joining them.

The end credits show Catherine and Tyler happily raising a dog and three children.

== Cast ==
- Louise Linton as Catherine Black
- Ed Westwick as Tyler Jones
- Shuya Chang as Yu Yan
- Jimmy Dinh as Tien Minh
- Tyler Barnes as Chad
- Gwen Van Dam as Grandma Betty
- Joel Michaely as Patrick

== Production ==
In April 2019, it was announced Louise Linton and Ed Westwick had joined the cast of the film, with Linton directing from a screenplay she wrote, and serving as a producer under her Stormchaser Films banner.

== Release ==
In November 2020, STX Entertainment acquired U.S. distribution rights to the film. It was released on February 12, 2021.

It received digital distribution in the United Kingdom

== Reception ==
Me You Madness received negative reviews from film critics. On Rotten Tomatoes it holds a 22% approval rating based on 11 reviews, with an average rating of 3.60/10.

On Metacritic the film scored only 7 out of 100 and was ultimately considered the worst film of 2021.
