= John Robinson (American actor) =

American actor

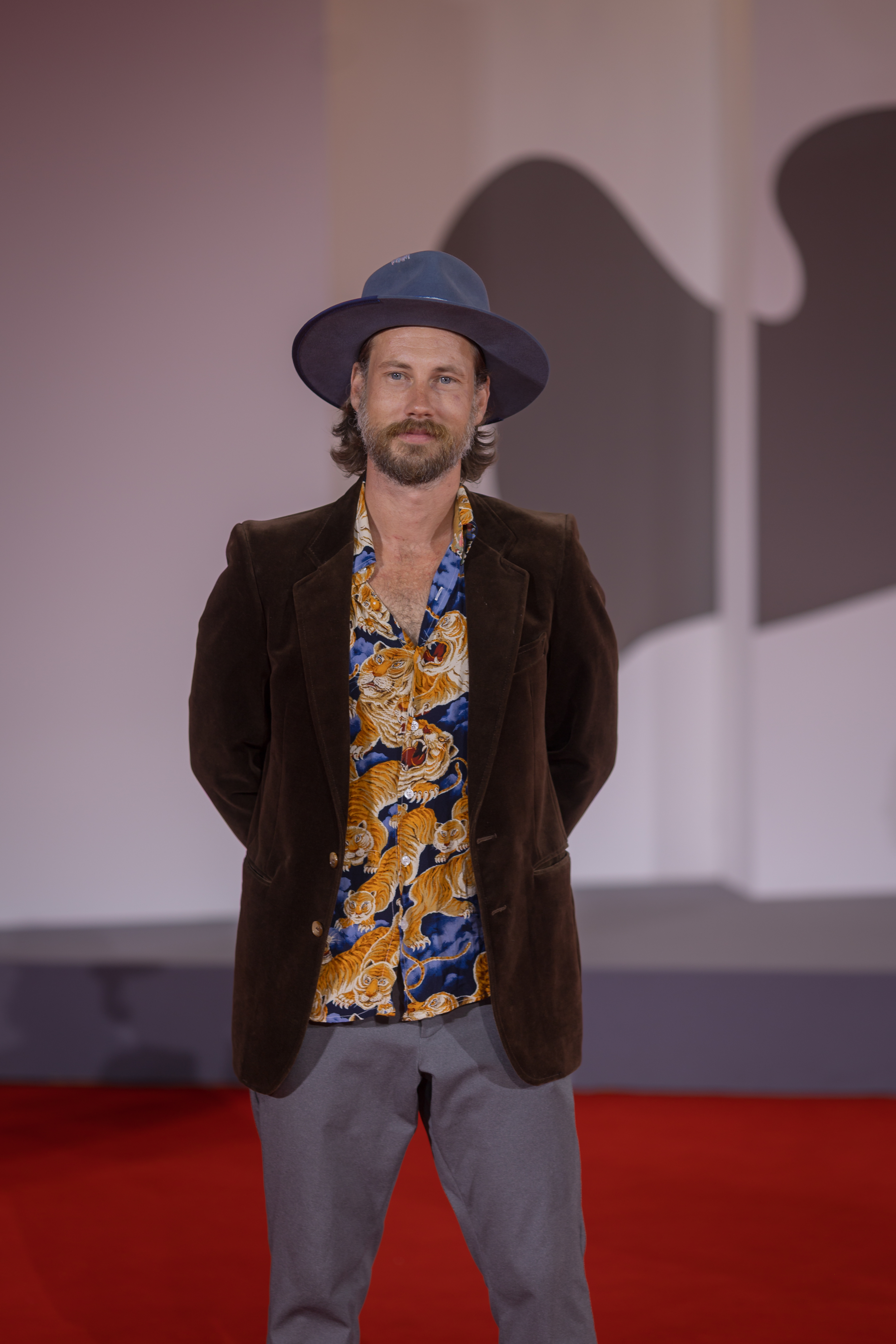
- John Robinson in 2025
- Born: October 25, 1985 (age 40); Portland, Oregon
- Occupation: Actor
- Years active: 2003–present

John Robinson (born October 25, 1985) is an American actor. He made his on-screen debut with a starring role in the Gus Van Sant's psychological drama film Elephant (2003), which earned him mainstream recognition.

Following Elephant, Robinson had a supporting role in the drama film The Heart Is Deceitful Above All Things (2004) before receiving further attention for his starring role portraying skateboarder Stacy Peralta in the biographical film Lords of Dogtown (2005). In the late 2000s, Robinson had starring roles in the films Remember the Daze (2007) and Wendy and Lucy (2008), and supporting roles in Seraphim Falls (2006) and Transformers (2007).

In the 2010s, Robinson starred in the films Something Wicked (2014) and Intruder (2016). In the 2020s, he portrayed writer Harry Mathews in a starring role in the French drama film Niki (2024), and had a supporting role in the thriller film On the Line (2022).

== Early life ==
Robinson enjoys snowboarding and played lacrosse in high school. He has also done some modeling. He is a 2005 graduate of the Oregon Episcopal School. Robinson gave an in-depth interview in issue 10 of Hero, published in October 2013.

== Filmography ==
Key
†	Denotes film or TV productions that have not yet been released

=== Film ===
Year	Title	Role	Notes
2003	Elephant	John McFarland	
2004	The Heart Is Deceitful Above All Things	Aaron	
2005	Lords of Dogtown	Stacy Peralta	
2006	Seraphim Falls	The Kid	
2007	Transformers	Miles Lancaster	
2007	Remember the Daze	Bailey	
2008	Wendy and Lucy	Andy Mooney	
2011	Homecoming	Derrick	
2011	Between the Wish and the Thing	Ben	Short film
2012	The Napkin	John	Short film
2012	Forbidden Kiss	Jake	
2012	186 Dollars to Freedom	Wayne	
2013	Big Sur	Paul Smith	
2013	She Loves Me Not	Dusty	
2014	Boys of Abu Ghraib	Ryan Fox	
2014	Something Wicked	James	
2014	She's Funny That Way	Andre	Uncredited
2015	There Is a New World Somewhere	Ethan	
2015	Sky	Night biker	
2016	Hot Bot	Rodney	
2016	Intruder	John	
2016	Alcoholist	Trevor	
2016	Room 105	Mike	
2017	Avenues	Richard	
2017	Cut Off	Clive Stone	
2018	The Cellar	Marek	
2018	Amityville Murders	Ronald DeFeo, Jr.	
2019	Billboard	Casey	
2022	Alone at Night	Handyman	
2022	House of Lust	Mark	
2022	On the Line	Noah	
2024	Funny Birds	Sebastian	
2024	Niki	Harry Mathews	
2025	Dead Man's Wire	John the Cameraman	
TBA	You Above All †		

=== Television ===
Year	Title	Role	Notes
2014	Looking	Liam	Episode: "Looking for Now"
2019	Dark Stories	Matthew	Episode: "Le Parc"
2022	Les papillons noirs	Steven Powell	Episode: "Une Proposition Déterminante"
