= Intruder (2016 film) =

- Theatrical release poster
- Directed by: Travis Zariwny
- Written by: Travis Zariwny
- Produced by: Michael D. Jones; Louise Linton; Tina Sutakanat
- Starring: Louise Linton; John Robinson; Moby
- Cinematography: Bradley Sellers
- Edited by: Ryan Folsey
- Music by: Nathaniel Levisay
- Production company: Stormchaser Films
- Distributed by: IFC Midnight
- Release date: June 24, 2016
- Running time: 91 minutes
- Country: United States
- Language: English

Intruder is a 2016 American horror film written and directed by Travis Zariwny. The film stars Louise Linton, John Robinson and Moby. The film was released on June 24, 2016, by IFC Midnight. Its plot follows a Portland, Oregon cellist who finds herself attacked by an intruder during a storm.

== Cast ==
- Louise Linton as Elizabeth
- John Robinson as John
- Moby as Vincent
- Zach Myers as Justin
- Mary McDonald-Lewis as Mrs. Pillar
- Susannah Mars as Grace
- Steven Beckingham as David
- Teresa Decher as Emily
- Ire Wardlaw as Marty
- Aaron Trainor as Chester
- Dakota Zariwny as Dakota

== Release ==
The film was released on June 24, 2016, by IFC Midnight.
