= Albert L. Gordon =

American lawyer

- Born: Albert L. Gordon; May 29, 1915; Pittsburgh, Pennsylvania, U.S.
- Died: August 10, 2009 (aged 94); Los Angeles, California, U.S.
- Education: Los Angeles City College; San Fernando Valley College of Law
- Occupations: Gay rights activist; Lawyer
- Known for: Gay rights activism
- Spouse(s): Lorraine Gordon (until 1987); Pearl Gordon
- Children: 2

Albert L. Gordon (May 29, 1915 – August 10, 2009) was an American attorney who become an advocate for gay rights through legal challenges in the 1970s and 1980s to laws that criminalized certain homosexual practices. He had become a lawyer late in life. He was heterosexual and actively supported gay legal causes after his son came out.

== Early life and education ==
Gordon was born on May 29, 1915, in Pittsburgh, Pennsylvania. He moved to Los Angeles as a child and later attended Los Angeles City College. He had met his wife, Lorraine, when they were in college, and their twin sons were born in 1937, the year they were married. He worked for the Lockheed Corporation during World War II and established a cleaning company with his wife after being fired from his job as a result of his union support.

== Legal career as gay rights supporter ==
Gordon attended the San Fernando Valley College of Law (now University of West Los Angeles) and passed the bar in 1962. His "whole world just fell apart" while he was in law school, when his son was arrested for solicitation of a male police officer. Described by his son as "homophobic", Gordon had carried the then-accepted "stereotype of a homosexual as a child molester or somebody effeminate". Even though he didn't feel his son fit the generalization, he became estranged from his son for years after the incident. The difficulties in dealing with the situation ended up causing Gordon to separate from his wife. As the years passed, Gordon became acquainted with his son's gay friends who had come to him with legal issues. Gordon's attitude towards homosexuals changed dramatically after he asked his son if he was gay and he broke down when the answer was "yes".

He and Morris Kight obtained affidavits from three couples—one each heterosexual, gay and lesbian—in an effort to challenge a 1915 law in California that made oral sex a felony based on inconsistent enforcement of a law that was often used to harass homosexuals. He called for the Los Angeles Police Department to arrest the three couples at a publicity event held at the Los Angeles Press Club, but no police came to make the planned staged arrests. Nor would the police arrest the couples after Gordon made citizen's arrests and brought them down to an LAPD station and the Los Angeles County District Attorney's office stated that no charges would be filed as it was against the office's policy to charge consenting adults for sexual acts done in private. On the basis of his advocacy together with Kight, the California Legislature repealed the statute in 1975.

Police conducted a raid on a gay bathhouse in L.A. in 1975, arresting individuals who had been participating in a mock slave auction fundraising event; police charged those arrested with felonies under laws that prohibited slave trafficking. After Gordon won the release of the 40 people arrested, he was one of the mock slaves who were put up for sale in a second fundraising event organized by Rev. Troy Perry to raise money for their defense, and was sold for $369 to his own wife.

A West Hollywood establishment called Barney's Beanery had long had anti-homosexual wording on signs and matchbooks at the restaurant, reading "Fagots [sic] Stay Out". The restaurant's owner stated that he didn't believe that the signs were offensive, that they were just part of the "tradition and decor" at Barney's and "obviously intended to be humorous". Through Gordon's efforts, the signs were removed in the mid-1980s.

== Death ==
Gordon died in Los Angeles at age 94 on August 10, 2009, of natural causes. He was survived by his second wife, Pearl, as well as by a son. His first wife died in 1987 and his son Gerald died in 1996.
