= University of West Los Angeles =

For-profit law school in Los Angeles

- Established: 1966
- School type: Private, for-profit law school
- Location: Inglewood and Woodland Hills, California, US
- Enrollment: 475
- Faculty: 4 full-time, 37 part-time
- USNWR ranking: Unranked
- Bar pass rate: 25% (July 2023 1st time takers)
- Website: www.uwla.edu

The University of West Los Angeles (UWLA) is a private, for-profit, ABA unaccredited, State Bar of California approved, law school and business school in Los Angeles, California. It maintains two campuses, one in Inglewood (West Los Angeles) and one in Woodland Hills (San Fernando Valley).

== History ==
UWLA was founded in 1966 by Henry Blunt and three other Culver City High School educators. The school of law received approval from the Committee of Bar Examiners of The State Bar of California in 1978. The San Fernando Valley College of Law (the first law school in the San Fernando Valley), co-founded as an independent school by Leo L. Mann and Joseph P. Lamont in 1962, was acquired and merged into UWLA in 2002.

Robert W. Brown is the current President of the University while Jay Paul Frykberg was appointed Dean of the Law School in 2013.

UWLA School of Business offers a Master of Science in Leadership, Management, and Technology program, as well as a Bachelors of Science in Business Administration degree completion program.

== Accreditation, admissions, and bar exam performance ==
UWLA is accredited by the WASC Senior College and University Commission. The university's law school is approved by the State Bar of California Committee of Bar Examiners but is not accredited by the American Bar Association. As a result, graduates only qualify to take the bar exam in California.

The university has a 100% acceptance rate, and an undergraduate degree is not necessary for admission to the law school.

For the July 2023 California Bar Examination, nine of the 36 UWLA graduates (25%) taking the exam for the first time passed (as compared to 64% for the average of all first time exam takers).

== Notable alumni ==
- Evan Freed, J.D. 1978, criminal defense attorney and photographer
- Albert L. Gordon, (deceased), J.D. 1962 from San Fernando Valley College of Law, former attorney and advocate for gay rights
- Louise Linton, J.D. (date unknown), actress, wife of Steve Mnuchin
- Frank K. Wheaton, J.D. 1982, sports agent, actor, attorney

== See also ==
- List of colleges and universities in California
