= Deaths in May 2021 =

The following is a list of notable deaths in May 2021.

Entries for each day are listed alphabetically by surname. A typical entry lists information in the following sequence:

- Name, age, country of citizenship at birth, subsequent country of citizenship (if applicable), reason for notability, cause of death (if known), and reference.

== May 2021 ==
=== 1 ===
- Felicia Adeyoyin, 82, Nigerian educationist and princess.
- Mary V. Ahern, 98, American radio and television producer.
- Gary K. Aronhalt, 72, American lawyer, Virginia secretary of public safety (1998–2002).
- Pieter Aspe, 68, Belgian writer.
- Debu Chaudhuri, 85, Indian sitarist and writer, complications from COVID-19.
- Geraldo Dantas de Andrade, 89, Brazilian Roman Catholic prelate, auxiliary bishop of São Luís do Maranhão (1998–2010).
- Francis Ducreux, 76, French racing cyclist.
- Marc Dudicourt, 88, French actor (A Matter of Resistance, King of Hearts, Jupiter's Thigh).
- Olympia Dukakis, 89, American actress (Moonstruck, Steel Magnolias, Tales of the City), Oscar winner (1988).
- Henryetta Edwards, 95, British actress (Squibs, She Shall Have Murder, The Feminine Touch).
- José Daniel Falla Robles, 64, Colombian Roman Catholic prelate, auxiliary bishop of Cali (2009–2016) and bishop of Soacha (since 2016), COVID-19.
- Jean Fontaine, 84, French theologian and writer, COVID-19.
- Helen Murray Free, 98, American chemist, complications from a stroke.
- Richard Halliwell, 62, British game designer (Warhammer, Space Hulk, Block Mania).
- József Hámori, 89, Hungarian biologist and politician, minister of culture (1998–1999).
- Joseph W. Hatchett, 88, American jurist, judge of the U.S. Court of Appeals for the Fifth Circuit (1979–1981), judge (1981–1999) and chief judge (1996–1999) of the Eleventh Circuit.
- Peter Heerey, 82, Australian jurist, judge of the Federal Court of Australia (1990–2009), cancer.
- Włodzimierz Heliński, 65, Polish speedway rider.
- Tom Hickey, 77, Irish actor (Gothic, High Spirits, My Left Foot).
- Wondress Hutchinson, 56, American singer ("Got to Have Your Love").
- Paul Ioannidis, 97, Greek resistance fighter and pilot.
- Al Jamison, 83, American football player (Houston Oilers).
- Kate Jennings, 72, Australian poet and writer (Moral Hazard).
- Bikramjeet Kanwarpal, 52, Indian actor (Shortcut Romeo, Ghazi, Madha), COVID-19.
- Ghulam Mohammed Khan, 74, Indian equestrian, COVID-19.
- Kuan Yun-loong, 92, Taiwanese painter, writer and poet, complications from a fall.
- John Paul Leon, 49, American comic book artist (Static, Earth X, The Winter Men), cancer.
- Edy Lima, 96, Brazilian writer, Prêmio Jabuti laureate (1975).
- Nancy McCredie, 76, Canadian Olympic athlete (1964).
- Nine Moati, 83, French novelist.
- Joseph Z. Nederlander, 93, American theatre owner and manager.
- Barry Nelson, 89, Australian rugby league footballer (Canterbury-Bankstown Bulldogs, Newtown Jets).
- Andrzej Osęka, 89, Polish art historian, journalist and art critic, recipient of the Order of Polonia Restituta.
- Mikhail Plotkin, 77, Russian music producer and administrator (Vesyolye Rebyata, Samotsvety, Leysya, Pesnya), complications from COVID-19.
- Ricardo Ramírez, 48, Argentine footballer, complications from COVID-19.
- Rafael Roncagliolo, 76, Peruvian diplomat and politician, minister of foreign affairs (2011–2013).
- Kishan Rungta, 88, Indian cricket player (Maharashtra, Rajasthan) and administrator, COVID-19.
- Mohammad Shahabuddin, 53, Indian politician and convicted kidnapper, Bihar MLA (1990–1996) and MP (1996–2009), COVID-19.
- W. Royal Stokes, 90, American writer.
- Henry Ventura, 55, Venezuelan politician, deputy (since 2020) and minister of health (2015), COVID-19.
- Ernest E. West, 89, American soldier, Medal of Honor recipient.
- Stuart Woolf, 85, English-Italian historian.

=== 2 ===
- Bob Abernethy, 93, American journalist (NBC News) and television presenter (Religion & Ethics Newsweekly).
- Alcira Argumedo, 80, Argentine sociologist and politician, deputy (2009–2017), lung cancer.
- John Bridgwater, 83, British chemical engineer.
- Joel Chadabe, 82, American electronic music pioneer.
- Bronisław Cieślak, 77, Polish actor (07 zgłoś się, Pierwsza miłość), television presenter and politician, deputy (1997–2005).
- Gwendalyn F. Cody, 99, American politician, member of the Virginia House of Delegates (1983–1986).
- Frank Costa, 83, Australian entrepreneur and philanthropist, president of Geelong Football Club (1998–2010), cancer.
- Jacques d'Amboise, 86, American ballet dancer, choreographer and actor (Seven Brides for Seven Brothers, Carousel, Off Beat), stroke.
- Lolly Debattista, 91, Maltese footballer (Floriana, Ħamrun Spartans, Valletta).
- David Humphreys, 84, Australian Olympic cyclist (1964).
- Abdur Rauf Khan, 82, Bangladeshi politician, MP (1988–1990).
- Hans Lotz, 73, German-Australian hammer thrower.
- Eric McClure, 42, American racing driver (NASCAR Xfinity Series).
- Sally Falk Moore, 97, American legal anthropologist.
- Andrzej Możejko, 72, Polish footballer (Widzew Łódź).
- S. G. Neginhal, 92, Indian forester and conservationist, COVID-19.
- Janneke Raaijmakers, 47, Dutch historian, cancer.
- Donald W. Roberts, 88, American insect pathologist.
- Teresa Román Vélez, 95, Colombian writer and chef.
- Carlos Romero Barceló, 88, Puerto Rican politician, mayor of San Juan (1969–1977) and governor (1977–1985), sepsis complicated by a urinary tract infection.
- Pat Semple, 81, Scottish landscape artist.
- John Charles Sherris, 100, English-American physician.
- Damodar Barku Shingada, 66, Indian politician, MP (1980–1996, 2004–2009), COVID-19.
- Marcel Stellman, 96, Belgian record producer and lyricist, creator of Countdown.
- Jesús Hilario Tundidor, 85, Spanish poet.
- Bobby Unser, 87, American Hall of Fame racing driver, three-time Indianapolis 500 winner.
- Paul Vollmar, 86, German-born Swiss Roman Catholic prelate, auxiliary bishop of Chur (1993–2009).
- Tommy West, 78, American music producer (Life and Times, I Got a Name) and singer-songwriter, complications from Parkinson's disease.
- Blaha Ben Ziane, 67–68, Algerian actor (Nass Mlah City, Djemai Family, Sultan Achour 10), complications from surgery.

=== 3 ===
- Alfons Adam, 76, Austrian lawyer and politician, founder of Christian Party of Austria.
- Rafael Albrecht, 79, Argentine footballer (San Lorenzo, Club León, national team), COVID-19.
- Noor Alam Khalil Amini, 68, Indian Islamic scholar.
- Vinod Kumar Bansal, 71, Indian educationist, heart attack.
- Aurélien Boisvert, 93, Canadian historian.
- Marion M. Bradford, 74, American scientist (Bradford protein assay).
- Hal Breeden, 76, American baseball player (Montreal Expos, Hanshin Tigers, Chicago Cubs).
- Donald Cameron, 74, Canadian politician, premier of Nova Scotia (1991–1993) and Nova Scotia MLA (1974–1993).
- María Colombo de Acevedo, 64, Argentine politician, senator (2001–2009), COVID-19.
- Seán Corcoran, 74, Irish singer.
- Mary Cullinan, 70, American academic administrator, president of Eastern Washington University.
- Vinson Filyaw, 51, American convicted child rapist.
- Tatjana Gamerith, 102, German-Austrian painter and graphic artist.
- András Gergely, 74, Hungarian historian and diplomat, ambassador to the Netherlands.
- Sabbam Hari, 68, Indian politician, MP (2009–2014), COVID-19.
- Brian S. Hartley, 95, British biochemist.
- Surat Ikramov, 76, Uzbekistani human rights activist, pneumonia, diabetes and prostate cancer.
- Jagmohan, 93, Indian civil servant and politician, governor of Jammu and Kashmir (1984–1990), MP (1996–2004) and lieutenant governor of Delhi (1980–1981, 1982–1984).
- Alan Keely, 38, Irish footballer (Shelbourne).
- Michèle Léridon, 62, French journalist and news director (Agence France-Presse, Conseil supérieur de l'audiovisuel member).
- Iñaki Mallona Txertudi, 88, Spanish-born Puerto Rican Roman Catholic prelate, bishop of Arecibo (1991–2010).
- Steve McKean, 77, American-born New Zealand basketball coach (national team), cancer.
- Else Michelet, 79, Norwegian journalist and satirist.
- Frazier Glenn Miller Jr., 80, American domestic terrorist, perpetrator of the Overland Park Jewish Community Center shooting.
- Phil Naro, 63, American rock vocalist and theme songwriter (6teen), tongue cancer.
- Volodymyr Nechayev, 70, Ukrainian football player (Chornomorets Odesa, Kolos Nikopol) and manager (Olkom Melitopol).
- Juliette Paskowitz, 89, American singer and surfer.
- R. Balakrishna Pillai, 86, Indian politician and actor (Vedikkettu, Ival Oru Naadody), Kerala MLA (1960–1965, 1977–2006).
- Lloyd Price, 88, American Hall of Fame R&B singer ("Personality", "Lawdy Miss Clawdy", "Stagger Lee"), complications from diabetes.
- Hamid Rashid Maʽala, Iraqi politician, MP (2005–2010), COVID-19.
- Cliff Slaughter, 92, British political activist.
- Dick Steere, 94, American football player (Philadelphia Eagles, Edmonton Eskimos).
- Masatomo Taniguchi, 75, Japanese Olympic basketball player (1972), pancreatic cancer.
- Kamel Tchalabi, 74, Algerian footballer (USM Alger, national team).
- Burhanettin Uysal, 53, Turkish academic and politician, MP (2015–2018), COVID-19.
- Franz Vansteenkiste, 86, Belgian politician, MP (1981–1987).
- Ed Ward, 72, American music writer and radio commentator.
- Béchir Ben Yahmed, 93, Tunisian-French journalist, founder of Jeune Afrique, complications from COVID-19.

=== 4 ===
- Simon Achidi Achu, 86, Cameroonian politician, prime minister (1992–1996) and senator (since 2013).
- Antony Anandarayar, 75, Indian Roman Catholic prelate, bishop of Ootacamund (1997–2004) and archbishop of Pondicherry and Cuddalore (2004–2021), COVID-19.
- Julie Chipchase, 60, British football player and manager (Leeds United Ladies, Doncaster Rovers), cancer.
- Steve Conroy, 64, English footballer (Sheffield United, Rotherham United, Rochdale).
- Aloísio Hilário de Pinho, 87, Brazilian Roman Catholic prelate, bishop of Jataí (2000–2009) and Tocantinópolis (1981–1999), heart attack.
- Margaret Forsyth, 59, New Zealand netball player (national team), coach (Magic), and politician, Hamilton city councillor (2010–2016, since 2019), cancer.
- Omar Hugo Gómez, 65, Argentine footballer (Quilmes Atlético Club), COVID-19.
- Subhadra Sen Gupta, 68, Indian writer, COVID-19.
- Paulo Gustavo, 42, Brazilian actor (Minha Mãe é uma Peça, Vai Que Cola, Fala Sério, Mãe!) and comedian, complications from COVID-19.
- Jim Hagan, 83, American basketball player (Tennessee Tech Golden Eagles, Phillips 66ers).
- Jan Hahn, 47, German television presenter and radio host (Wheel of Fortune).
- Chuck Hicks, 93, American stuntman (Dick Tracy, Star Trek II: The Wrath of Khan, Runaway Train), complications from a stroke.
- Peter Toshio Jinushi, 90, Japanese Roman Catholic prelate, bishop of Sapporo (1987–2009).
- Jim Johnson, 78, Canadian ice hockey player (Philadelphia Flyers, Los Angeles Kings, Minnesota Fighting Saints).
- V. Kalyanam, 98, Indian freedom fighter.
- Nick Kamen, 59, English model, singer ("Each Time You Break My Heart") and songwriter ("I Promised Myself"), bone marrow cancer.
- Yosef Kleinman, 91, Slovak Holocaust survivor.
- Genji Kuniyoshi, 90, Japanese singer, prostate cancer.
- Ricky Lo, 75, Filipino journalist (The Philippine Star) and television host (CelebriTV), stroke.
- Bettye Lowe, 88, American politician.
- Sir Leslie Marr, 2nd Baronet, 98, British racing driver and landscape artist.
- Alan McLoughlin, 54, Irish footballer (Portsmouth, Swindon Town, national team), cancer.
- Ray Miller, 76, American baseball coach and manager (Minnesota Twins, Baltimore Orioles).
- Luciano Modica, 71, Italian politician, senator (2002–2006), heart attack.
- Harvey Frans Nelson Jr., 97, American diplomat, ambassador to Swaziland (1985–1988).
- Abhilasha Patil, 47, Indian actress (Chhichhore), COVID-19.
- Karamat Rahman Niazi, Pakistani naval officer, chief of naval staff (1979–1983).
- Traffic Ramaswamy, 87, Indian social activist, cardiac arrest.
- Willian Santiago, 30, Brazilian illustrator, graphic designer and educator, COVID-19.
- Julião Sarmento, 72, Portuguese multimedia artist and painter.
- Aleksandr Saprykin, 74, Russian volleyball player, Olympic bronze medalist (1972).
- Raúl Horacio Scarrone Carrero, 90, Uruguayan Roman Catholic prelate, auxiliary bishop of Montevideo (1982–1987) and bishop of Florida (1987–2008).
- T. S. Shanbhag, 84, Indian bookseller, COVID-19.
- Kirsten Stallknecht, 83, Danish nurse and trade unionist, president of FTF (1977–1984) and ICN (1997–2001).
- Manas Bihari Verma, 77, Indian aeronautical scientist.
- William Westenra, 7th Baron Rossmore, 90, Irish noble.
- Bernard Ziegler, 88, French pilot and engineer (Airbus).

=== 5 ===
- Jonathan Bush, 89, American banker.
- Cheng Youshu, 97, Chinese diplomat and poet.
- Paul Chomat, 83, French politician, deputy (1981–1988).
- Del Crandall, 91, American baseball player (Boston/Milwaukee Braves) and manager (Milwaukee Brewers).
- Konstantinas Dobrovolskis, 81, Lithuanian radiologist, minister of health (2001–2003).
- Lucinda Franks, 74, American journalist (The New Yorker, The New York Times, The Atlantic), Pulitzer Prize winner (1971), cancer.
- Yuriy Gavrilov, 54, Ukrainian handball player, Olympic gold medalist (1992).
- Fikrat Goja, 85, Azerbaijani poet.
- Abelardo González, 76, Spanish footballer (UP Langreo, Sporting de Gijón, Valencia CF).
- Emilio Gurruchaga, 86, Spanish Olympic sailor.
- Emine Işınsu, 82, Turkish writer, poet, and journalist.
- Bertil Johansson, 86, Swedish footballer (IFK Göteborg, national team).
- George Jung, 78, American drug trafficker and smuggler, subject of Blow.
- René Le Corre, 98, French poet.
- Li Man-king, 99, Hong Kong broadcaster (Rediffusion Radio, Radio Vilaverde Lda, CRHK).
- Hilarie Lindsay, 99, Australian toy manufacturer and writer.
- Urbano Marín, 85, Chilean judge, president of the Supreme Court (2008–2010).
- Marcus McCraven, 97, American electrical engineer and nuclear scientist.
- Doug Melvin, 92, British rower.
- Nuno P. Monteiro, 50, Portuguese-American political scientist.
- T. K. S. Natarajan, 87, Indian actor (Then Kinnam, Needhikku Thalaivanangu, Mangala Vaathiyam).
- Edward Pietrzyk, 71, Polish military officer and diplomat.
- Georgy Prokopenko, 84, Ukrainian swimmer, Olympic silver medallist (1964).
- Valeriy Raenko, 65, Russian politician, member (since 2007) and chairman (since 2011) of the Legislative Assembly of Kamchatka Krai.
- Mark Reed, 66, American physicist.
- Barry Reilly, 73, Australian rugby league player (Sydney Roosters, Cronulla-Sutherland Sharks), kidney failure.
- Joan Schenkar, 78, American playwright and writer.
- Hermann Schmitz, 92, German philosopher and professor (Kiel University).
- Gerry Schoen, 74, American baseball player (Washington Senators).
- Ashraf Sehrai, 77, Indian Kashmiri separatist, chairman of All Parties Hurriyat Conference (since 2018), COVID-19.
- Dildar Hossain Selim, 70, Bangladeshi politician, MP (2001–2006).
- Frank Sheehan, 83, Australian politician, Victorian MLA (1982–1992).
- Thangjam Nandakishor Singh, 64, Indian politician, Manipur MLA (2007–2012), COVID-19.
- Feđa Stojanović, 73, Serbian actor (T.T. Syndrome, The Fourth Man, Ljubav i drugi zločini).
- David F. Swensen, 67, American investor and philanthropist, cancer.
- Dan Tawfik, 65, Israeli biochemist (Weizmann Institute of Science), EMET Prize winner (2020), climbing accident.
- Ray Teret, 79, English disc jockey and convicted rapist.
- K. V. Thikkurissi, 88, Indian writer and poet, COVID-19.
- Philipose Mar Chrysostom Mar Thoma, 103, Indian Mar Thoma Syrian prelate, metropolitan of the Church (1999–2007).
- Vivek Yadav, 36, Indian cricketer (Rajasthan), complications from stomach cancer and COVID-19.
- Alfredo Zanellato, 90, Italian painter and sculptor.

=== 6 ===
- G. Anand, 67, Indian playback singer, COVID-19.
- Yitzhak Arad, 94, Israeli military officer and historian, director of Yad Vashem (1972–1993).
- Paul Aulagnier, 77, French Traditionalist Catholic priest, co-founder of the Institute of the Good Shepherd.
- Jim Bertelsen, 71, American football player (Los Angeles Rams).
- Basil Bhuriya, 65, Indian Roman Catholic prelate, bishop of Jhabua (since 2015), complications from COVID-19.
- David Bulow, 41, American soccer player (Dungannon Swifts, Richmond Kickers), stroke.
- Prateek Chaudhuri, 49, Indian sitarist, COVID-19.
- Daniele Cioni, 62, Italian Olympic sport shooter (1984, 1988, 1992), COVID-19.
- Comagan, 48, Indian singer, composer and actor, COVID-19.
- David H. Gambrell, 91, American politician, senator (1971–1972).
- Carlos Timoteo Griguol, 84, Argentine football player (Atlanta) and manager (Rosario Central, Ferro Carril Oeste), COVID-19.
- Shamim Hanafi, 82, Indian dramatist and literary critic, COVID-19.
- Murray Hedgcock, 90, Australian cricket writer and journalist.
- Dal Bahadur Kori, 64, Indian politician, Uttar Pradesh MLA (since 2017), complications from COVID-19.
- Vanya Kostova, 64, Bulgarian singer (Tonika), complications from COVID-19.
- Liu Xingtu, 84, Chinese agronomist, member of the Chinese Academy of Engineering.
- Bhaskar Maiya, 70, Indian author, scholar and translator, COVID-19.
- Graham Mander, 89, New Zealand Olympic sailor (1968).
- Philip P. Mason, 94, American archivist and author.
- Humberto Maturana, 92, Chilean philosopher (Autopoiesis and Cognition: The Realization of the Living) and biologist.
- Mohan Mishra, 83, Indian physician.
- Kentaro Miura, 54, Japanese manga artist (Berserk, Japan, King of Wolves), aortic dissection.
- Gutha Muniratnam, 85, Indian social worker, COVID-19.
- Guillermo Murray, 93, Argentine-born Mexican actor (Alfonsina, The Chinese Room, The Rebellious Novice), complications from dementia.
- Jacques Nihoul, 83, Belgian marine biologist.
- John Ntegyereize, 74, Ugandan Anglican prelate, bishop of Kinkiizi (1995–2010).
- P. Pandu, 74, Indian actor (Karaiyellam Shenbagapoo, Kadhal Kottai, Vellachi) and comedian, COVID-19.
- Georges Perron, 96, French Roman Catholic prelate, bishop of Djibouti (1992–2001).
- Prem Dhoj Pradhan, 82, Nepalese musician.
- Palamadai Muthuswamy Ramachandran, 86, Indian air force officer, vice chief of the Air Staff (1991–1993).
- Christophe Revault, 49, French footballer (Paris Saint-Germain, Toulouse, Le Havre).
- Sumbul Shahid, 66–67, Pakistani actress (Dekho Chaand Aaya, Meri Behan Meri Dewrani, Aik Aur Sitam Hai), COVID-19.
- Prakashchandra Pandurang Shirodkar, 80, Indian archaeologist and politician.
- Ajit Singh, 82, Indian politician, MP (1989–2014), minister of civil aviation (2011–2014) and commerce and industry (1989–1990), COVID-19.
- Matang Sinh, 67, Indian politician, MP (1992–1998), complications from COVID-19.
- Bhagwati Dhar Vajpayee, 96, Indian journalist, heart attack.
- Paul Van Doren, 90, American entrepreneur, co-founder of Vans.
- Bruce West, 81, American artist, complications from Parkinson's disease.
- Karl Wirsum, 81, American artist, cardiac arrest.
- Felix Zabala, 83, Cuban-born American boxing promoter.

=== 7 ===
- Aisha Alhassan, 61, Nigerian lawyer and politician, senator (2011–2015).
- Ernest Angley, 99, American evangelist.
- Ananda Gopal Bandopadhyay, 79, Indian tabla player, COVID-19.
- George Barlow, 88, Australian footballer (Balgownie Rangers).
- Courtenay Bartholomew, 89, Trinidadian physician.
- Vanraj Bhatia, 93, Indian composer (Tamas, 36 Chowringhee Lane, Ramayana: The Legend of Prince Rama).
- Cassiano, 77, Brazilian singer-songwriter and guitarist.
- Antanas Čikotas, 69, Lithuanian rower.
- M. Y. Eqbal, 70, Indian jurist, judge of the Supreme Court (2012–2016) and chief justice of Madras High Court (2010–2013), COVID-19.
- Emmanuel Erskine, 86, Ghanaian military officer, chief of army staff (1972–1974), commander of UNIFIL (1978–1981) and UNTSO (1976–1978, 1981–1986).
- Antoni Gausí, 93, Spanish football player (Real Madrid, Real Zaragoza) and executive (UE Lleida).
- Pál Gömöry, 85, Hungarian Olympic sailor (1968).
- Hubert Hughes, 87, Anguillan politician, chief minister (1994–2000, 2010–2015).
- Heinz Hölscher, 95, German cinematographer (Two People, Dead Body on Broadway, Starke Zeiten).
- Abdullahi Sheikh Ismail, 80–81, Somalian diplomat, minister of foreign affairs (2004–2006).
- John Kay, 77, British journalist (The Sun).
- Tawny Kitaen, 59, American actress (The Perils of Gwendoline in the Land of the Yik-Yak, Bachelor Party, Witchboard), dilated cardiomyopathy.
- Oleg Krivonogov, 82, Russian diplomat, ambassador to Luxembourg (1997–2001).
- Lê Thụy Hải, 75, Vietnamese football player (Tong Cuc Duong Sat, national team) and coach (Becamex Binh Duong FC), pancreatic cancer.
- Yegor Ligachyov, 100, Russian politician, member of the Soviet Central Committee (1981–1990) and Politburo (1985–1990), second secretary of the Communist Party (1985–1990).
- John Llewelyn, 93, Welsh-born Scottish photographer.
- Graham Matters, 72, Australian actor (Oz).
- David McCall, 81, Australian Anglican bishop of Willochra (1987–2000) and Bunbury (2000–2010).
- Ram Sajan Pandey, 64, Indian academic, COVID-19.
- Martín Pando, 86, Argentine footballer (Argentinos Juniors, River Plate, national team).
- Cruz Reynoso, 90, American civil rights lawyer and jurist, associate justice of the Supreme Court of California (1982–1987).
- Gamal Salama, 75, Egyptian songwriter and melodist, COVID-19.
- Vinod Singh, 57, Indian politician, Uttar Pradesh MLA (1996–2017), COVID-19.
- John Sludden, 56, Scottish football player (Celtic, Ayr United) and manager (Bo'ness United).
- Tai, 52, American Asian elephant (Larger than Life, Operation Dumbo Drop, George of the Jungle, Water for Elephants), kidney failure.
- Kalthoon Thilak, 78, Indian actor (Aarilirunthu Arubathu Varai, Kalthoon), COVID-19.
- Keith Waples, 97, Canadian sulky driver and horse trainer.

=== 8 ===
- Tanveer Akhtar, Indian politician, Bihar MLC (since 2016), COVID-19.
- Mixel Berhokoirigoin, 69, French farmer and activist.
- Tatiana Bershadskaya, 99, Russian musicologist.
- Bo, 12, American dog, presidential pet (2009–2017), cancer.
- Bob Chitester, 83, American television executive and producer, cancer.
- Raul Danda, 63, Angolan politician, MP (2012–2016).
- Georgi Dimitrov, 62, Bulgarian football player (CSKA Sofia, national team) and manager (Marek Dupnitsa), cancer.
- David K. Doyle, 89, American lieutenant general.
- Pete du Pont, 86, American politician, governor of Delaware (1977–1985), member of the Delaware (1969–1971) and U.S. House of Representatives (1971–1977).
- Fadeli, 65, Indonesian politician, regent of Lamongan (2010–2015, 2016–2021).
- Graeme Ferguson, 91, Canadian filmmaker, co-inventor of IMAX, cancer.
- Paul A. Fischer, 85, American politician.
- Donald L. Friedrich, 91, American politician, member of the Minnesota House of Representatives (1975–1981).
- Curtis Fuller, 88, American jazz trombonist.
- Aurelia Greene, 86, American politician, member of the New York State Assembly (1982–2009).
- Miodrag Gvozdenović, 76, Serbian volleyball player (Yugoslavia national team).
- Eula Hall, 93, American healthcare activist.
- Ronald Inglehart, 86, American political scientist (Inglehart–Welzel cultural map of the world).
- Helmut Jahn, 81, German-American architect (Liberty Place, James R. Thompson Center, 50 West Street), traffic collision.
- Theodore Katsanevas, 74, Greek academic and politician, MP (1989–2004) and founder of Drachmi Greek Democratic Movement Five Stars, COVID-19.
- Khat Thi, 44–45, Burmese poet and protester.
- Maharaj Krishan Kaushik, 66, Indian field hockey player, Olympic champion (1980), COVID-19.
- Pantelis Kouros, 88, Cypriot politician, deputy minister to the president (1993–2003).
- Lee Han-dong, 86, South Korean politician, prime minister (2000–2002).
- German Lorca, 98, Brazilian photographer.
- Low Yow Chuan, 88, Malaysian real estate developer.
- Cal Luther, 93, American basketball coach (Murray State Racers, UT Martin Skyhawks, Longwood Lancers).
- Jean Maran, 101, French politician, deputy (1986–1988) and mayor of Sainte-Luce, Martinique (1965–1990), heart failure.
- Ghenady Meirson, 63, Soviet-born American pianist and vocal coach, cancer.
- Bernice Mitchell, 81, American politician.
- S. A. E. Nababan, 87, Indonesian Lutheran prelate.
- Sanda Oumarou, 38, Cameroonian footballer (Coton Sport, Al Masry).
- Don Parrish, 66, American football player (Kansas City Chiefs).
- Gordon Pettengill, 95, American radio astronomer, congestive heart failure.
- Jean-Luc Phaneuf, 65, Canadian ice hockey player (Toronto Toros, Birmingham Bulls).
- Jean-Claude Romer, 88, French actor, film critic and film historian.
- Shakeel Ahmed Samdani, 59, Indian academic, COVID-19.
- Miguel Schweitzer Walters, 80, Chilean lawyer and diplomat, minister of foreign affairs (1983), ambassador to the United Kingdom (1980–1983).
- Eleanor Bernert Sheldon, 101, American sociologist, president of the SSRC (1972–1979).
- Spencer Silver, 80, American chemist, co-inventor of Post-it Notes.
- Ravinder Pal Singh, 60, Indian field hockey player, Olympic champion (1980), COVID-19.
- George Skudder, 73, New Zealand rugby union player (Waikato, New Zealand Māori, national team).
- Rana Waitai, 78, New Zealand politician, MP (1996–1999).
- Robert Walpole, 10th Baron Walpole, 82, British hereditary peer, member of the House of Lords (1999–2017).
- Asfaw Yemiru, 78–79, Ethiopian educator.

=== 9 ===
- Ahmed Al Khattab, 78–79, Jordanian politician, minister of agriculture (2011–2013) and MP (1997–2001).
- Tristyn Bailey, 13, American student, stabbed.
- Jacques Bouveresse, 80, French philosopher.
- José Manuel Caballero Bonald, 94, Spanish poet and novelist, Miguel de Cervantes Prize winner (2012).
- Monique Cerisier-ben Guiga, 78, French politician, senator (1992–2011).
- Neil Connery, 82, Scottish actor (O.K. Connery, The Body Stealers).
- James Dean, 35, English footballer (Stalybridge Celtic, Chorley, Halifax Town). (body discovered on this date)
- Marye Anne Fox, 73, American chemist and academic administrator, chancellor of North Carolina State University (1998–2004) and the University of California, San Diego (2004–2012).
- Alec Graham, 91, British Anglican prelate, bishop of Newcastle (1981–1997).
- Karl-Günther von Hase, 103, German diplomat, ambassador to the United Kingdom (1970–1977), director of ZDF (1977–1982).
- George Hovland, 94, American Olympic cross country skier (1952).
- Robert David Jackson, 86, British-born Canadian diplomat.
- Meindert Leerling, 85, Dutch journalist and politician, member of the Second Chamber (1981–1994).
- Miguel Lifschitz, 65, Argentine politician, governor of Santa Fe (2015–2019) and mayor of Rosario, Santa Fe (2003–2011), COVID-19.
- Raghunath Mohapatra, 78, Indian architect, sculptor and politician, MP (since 2018), COVID-19.
- Chris Newman, 67, American musician, cancer.
- Bruno Oldani, 85, Swiss designer.
- Dhiru Parikh, 87, Indian poet and editor.
- Bratislav Petković, 72, Serbian film and theater director and playwright, minister of culture and information (2012–2013).
- Nandivada Rathnasree, 57, Indian astrophysicist, COVID-19.
- K. B. Shanappa, 82, Indian politician, MP (2006–2012), COVID-19.
- William Gerald Strongman, 84, Canadian politician.
- Viliam Turčány, 93, Slovak poet, translator and writer.
- Marion Walter, 92, German-born American mathematician.
- Robert Ward, 68, American politician, member (1984–2007) and minority leader (1994–2007) of the Connecticut House of Representatives (1994–2007), kidney failure.

=== 10 ===
- Maurice Adevah-Pœuf, 78, French politician, deputy (1981–1993, 1997–2002), mayor of Thiers (1977–2001).
- Sami Hasan Al Nash, 64, Yemeni football manager (national team), COVID-19.
- Miguel Arellano, 80, Mexican Olympic basketball player (1964, 1968), cancer.
- Josep Maria Batlle i Farran, 71, Spanish politician, senator (2002–2011) and mayor of Puigverd de Lleida (1979–2003), tractor accident.
- Lars-Gunnar Bodin, 85, Swedish electronic musician.
- Frank Brazier, 87, Australian Olympic cyclist (1956, 1960, 1964).
- Salem Chandrasekharan, Indian film producer (Sullan, Ghajini, Sabari), COVID-19.
- Haralambie Corbu, 91, Moldovan philologist, member of the Academy of Sciences of Moldova.
- Marc Daniëls, 61, Belgian comic book artist, COVID-19.
- Brendan Edwards, 85, Australian footballer (Hawthorn).
- Michel Fourniret, 79, French serial killer, respiratory failure.
- Fortunato Franco, 84, Indian footballer (Salgaocar, Maharashtra, national team).
- Art Gensler, 85, American architect, founder of Gensler.
- Inaya Jaber, 62, Lebanese writer and journalist.
- Kevin Jackson, 66, English writer, broadcaster and filmmaker.
- Dennis Joseph, 63, Indian screenwriter (Nirakkoottu, Rajavinte Makan) and film director (Manu Uncle), stroke.
- Jerome Kagan, 92, American psychologist.
- Sambhajirao Kakade, 89, Indian politician, MP (1977–1979, 1984–1989).
- Jenny King, 92, New Zealand librarian.
- Cristopher Mansilla, 30, Chilean track and road cyclist, COVID-19.
- Néstor Montelongo, 66, Uruguayan footballer (national team), 1983 Copa América winner.
- Johannes Møllehave, 84, Danish Lutheran priest and theologian.
- Dieudonné Ntep, 61, Cameroonian Olympic cyclist (1984).
- B. Prasada Rao, 65, Indian police officer, DGP of Andhra Pradesh (2013–2014), cardiac arrest.
- Rasa Singh Rawat, 79, Indian politician, MP (1989–2004).
- Froy Salinas, 81, American politician, member of the Texas House of Representatives (1977–1985).
- Richie Scheinblum, 78, American baseball player (Cleveland Indians).
- Michael Settonni, 61, American news anchor.
- Abdolvahab Shahidi, 98, Iranian barbat player, singer and composer, heart disease.
- Giosuè Stucchi, 90, Italian footballer (Udinese, Roma, Brescia).
- Joker Thulasi, 71, Indian actor (Thamizhachi, Udan Pirappu, Mannai Thottu Kumbidanum) and comedian, COVID-19.
- Svante Thuresson, 84, Swedish jazz musician ("Nygammal vals").
- Pauline Tinsley, 93, British soprano.

=== 11 ===
- Vahur Afanasjev, 41, Estonian writer.
- Victor Asirvatham, 80, Malaysian Olympic runner (1968).
- Henri Beaujean, 95, Guadeloupean politician, deputy of the French National Assembly (1986–1988).
- Serge Bouchard, 73, Canadian anthropologist and writer.
- Colt Brennan, 37, American football player (Hawaii Rainbow Warriors, Washington Redskins).
- Janine Brookner, 80, American lawyer and CIA agent, complications from kidney disease and cancer.
- Dan W. Brown, 70, American politician, member of the Missouri House of Representatives (2008–2010) and Senate (2011–2019).
- John Castellani, 94, American basketball coach (Seattle Redhawks).
- Attila Demény, 66, Hungarian composer and theatre director.
- Greg Findlay, 78, Canadian football player (BC Lions).
- K. R. Gouri Amma, 101, Indian politician, Travancore–Cochin (1951–1957) and Kerala MLA (1960–1965, 1970–1977, 1982–1996, 2001–2006).
- John Hickman, 78, American banjo player.
- Madampu Kunjukuttan, 79, Indian screenwriter (Parinamam) and actor (Aanachandam, Agninakshathram), COVID-19.
- Bernard Lachance, 46, Canadian singer-songwriter and conspiracy theorist, complications from AIDS.
- Christine Laprell, 71, German Olympic alpine skier (1968).
- Norman Lloyd, 106, American actor (St. Elsewhere, Limelight), producer and director (Alfred Hitchcock Presents).
- Nancy Marie, 112, Seychelles supercentenarian.
- Rashid Meer, 70, Indian poet and editor (Dhabak), COVID-19.
- Michael Monfils, 82, American politician, mayor of Green Bay, Wisconsin (1975–1979).
- Richard Nonas, 85, American sculptor.
- Mats Nyby, 74, Finnish politician, MP (1983–1999).
- Wilfried Peffgen, 78, German Olympic cyclist (1964).
- Howard H. Rainey, 93, American politician.
- Nellai Siva, 69, Indian actor (Mahaprabhu, Vetri Kodi Kattu, Kannum Kannum).
- Buddy Van Horn, 92, American stunt performer (High Plains Drifter, Pale Rider) and film director (The Dead Pool).
- Frank Warrick, 76, Australian television journalist and newsreader (BTQ).
- Lester L. Wolff, 102, American politician, member of the U.S. House of Representatives (1965–1981).
- Chuck Welke, 67, American politician, member of the South Dakota Senate (2013–2015).
- Vladislav Yegin, 32, Russian ice hockey player (Spartak Moscow, Avtomobilist Yekaterinburg), complications from COVID-19.
- Zemi Yenus, 61, Ethiopian businesswoman and autism activist, complications from COVID-19.

=== 12 ===
- Tofig Aghahuseynov, 98, Azerbaijani military leader.
- Homen Borgohain, 88, Indian journalist (Niyomiya Barta) and novelist, complications from COVID-19.
- Jerry Burns, 94, American football coach (Iowa Hawkeyes, Minnesota Vikings).
- Fred Buttsworth, 93, Australian footballer (West Perth, Essendon).
- Venugopal Chandrasekhar, 63, Indian table tennis player, COVID-19.
- Ubiratan D'Ambrosio, 88, Brazilian mathematician.
- Patrick Dean, 45, American cartoonist, complications from amyotrophic lateral sclerosis.
- Seamus Deane, 81, Northern Irish poet and writer (Reading in the Dark).
- Nick Downie, 74, British journalist and soldier, COVID-19.
- Jiří Feureisl, 89, Czech footballer (FC Karlovy Vary) and ice hockey player.
- Hurley Goodall, 93, American politician, member of the Indiana House of Representatives (1978–1992).
- Louis De Grève, 91, Belgian politician and jurist, senator (1974–1977), MP (1977–1984), and judge of the Court of Arbitration (1984–1999).
- Dixie Hale, 85, Irish footballer (Waterford).
- Rajeev Karwal, 58, Indian businessman, COVID-19.
- Jim Klobuchar, 93, American journalist and author (Star Tribune).
- Bob Koester, 88, American music executive, founder of Delmark Records.
- Kira Kreylis-Petrova, 89, Russian actress (Drumroll, Window to Paris, Russian Symphony).
- Vadim Logunov, 53, Russian footballer (Metallurg Lipetsk, APK Azov, Krystal Kherson).
- Maran, 48, Indian actor and singer (Ghilli), COVID-19.
- Tatiana Nikonova, 43, Russian feminist, journalist, and sex educator.
- Luigi Panigazzi, 96, Italian partisan and politician, senator (1983–1987).
- Ton Pansier, 74, Dutch footballer (XerxesDZB, SV SVV).
- Francisco Pelló Hernandis, 85, Spanish-born Argentine painter, sculptor and poet, heart failure.
- Vladimír Príkazský, 85, Czech journalist and politician, minister without portfolio (1990).
- Ján Repák, 65, Slovak Olympic volleyball player (1980).
- Ivanildo Rozenblad, 24, Surinamese footballer (S.V. Robinhood).
- Bryan Sperry, 95, American football player and coach.
- Stephen Sternberg, 100, American pathologist.
- Jack Terricloth, 50, American musician (The World/Inferno Friendship Society).
- Ralph Turlington, 100, American politician, member (1950–1974) and speaker (1967–1969) of the Florida House of Representatives, Florida commissioner of education (1974–1986).
- Higinio Vélez, 73, Cuban baseball coach (Santiago de Cuba, national team), COVID-19.

=== 13 ===
- Maria João Abreu, 57, Portuguese actress (Golpe de Sorte, Mar Salgado, Amor Maior), ruptured brain aneurysm.
- Raymond Biaussat, 89, French painter.
- Rick Brennan, 52, American rear admiral.
- Nona Conner, 37, American activist.
- Hal de Becker, 89, American dancer and writer.
- K. M. Hamsa Kunju, 79, Indian politician, Kerala MLA (1982–1986), cardiac arrest.
- Indu Jain, 84, Indian publishing executive, chairperson of The Times Group, complications of COVID-19.
- Olivier Jean-Marie, 61, French animator (Go West! A Lucky Luke Adventure, Zig & Sharko, Oggy and the Cockroaches), cancer.
- Marvin Kaye, 83, American author (The Masters of Solitude, Wintermind), complications from endometrial cancer.
- Dieter Lindner, 84, German racewalker, Olympic silver medalist (1964) and European champion (1966).
- Nelson Marcenaro, 68, Uruguayan footballer (national team), 1980 Mundialito winner, heart attack.
- Kenneth Mayhew, 104, British army officer, Military William Order recipient (1946).
- Eigil Misser, 87, Danish footballer (B 1913, national team).
- Abel Murrieta Gutiérrez, 58, Mexican politician and lawyer (LeBarón and Langford families massacre), deputy (2015–2018), shot.
- Božidar Nikolić, 79, Serbian film director (Balkan Spy, The Dark Side of the Sun, Three Tickets to Hollywood).
- Alberto Piccinini, 79, Argentine politician and trade unionist, member of the Constitutional Assembly (1994) and deputy (2001–2005), cardiorespiratory arrest.
- Feodor Pitcairn, 86, American photographer and environmentalist.
- Norman Simmons, 91, American pianist, arranger ("Wade in the Water"), and composer.
- Christa Stubnick, 87, German Olympic sprinter, silver medalist (1956).
- Pablo Uribe, 90, Colombian Olympic fencer (1956).
- George Wallerstein, 90, American astronomer.

=== 14 ===
- Sándor Balassa, 86, Hungarian composer.
- Jay Barbree, 87, American space travel news correspondent (NBC News).
- Otto Beatty Jr., 81, American politician, member of the Ohio House of Representatives (1980–1999).
- R. L. Bhatia, 100, Indian politician, MP (1971–1977, 1980–1989, 1991–2004), governor of Kerala (2004–2008) and Bihar (2008–2009), COVID-19.
- Torkild Brakstad, 75, Norwegian football player (Molde, national team) and manager (Tromsø).
- Glenn R. Croshaw, 70, American judge and politician, member of the Virginia House of Delegates (1987–2000).
- Eveline Cruickshanks, 94, British political historian.
- Barry Fry, 81, Canadian curler.
- Milan Ftáčnik, 64, Slovak politician, mayor of Bratislava (2010–2014).
- Jaime Garza, 67, Mexican actor (Navajeros, Missing, The Falcon and the Snowman), complications from diabetes.
- Raimund Hoghe, 72, German dancer, choreographer and author.
- William Irvine, Canadian teacher.
- Bob Jones, 81, American college basketball coach (Kentucky Wesleyan Panthers).
- Hartley Joynt, 82, Australian cricketer (Western Australia).
- Haziq Kamaruddin, 27, Malaysian Olympic archer (2012).
- Masao Kawai, 97, Japanese primatologist.
- Igor Lavrinenko, 60, Belarusian politician, member of the House of Representatives (since 2019).
- Ester Mägi, 99, Estonian composer.
- David McPhail, 76, New Zealand comedian and actor (A Week of It, Letter to Blanchy, Seven Periods with Mr Gormsby).
- Kanaka Murthy, 78, Indian sculptor, COVID-19.
- New Jack, 58, American professional wrestler (SMW, ECW, XPW), heart attack.
- Jorge Picciani, 66, Brazilian politician, Rio de Janeiro MLA (2003–2010), prostate cancer.
- Farooq Qaiser, 75, Pakistani puppeteer (Uncle Sargam), cardiac arrest.
- María Amalia Revelo, 65, Costa Rican businesswoman, minister of tourism (2018–2020).
- Lee Ross, 78, Canadian-born American psychologist.
- Waltraut Schälike, 94, German-Russian historian.
- Matheus Shikongo, 70, Namibian politician and businessman, mayor of Windhoek (1993–2010), COVID-19.
- Jarnail Singh, 48, Indian journalist and politician, Delhi MLA (2015–2017), COVID-19.
- Wang Yuan, 91, Chinese mathematician, member of the Chinese Academy of Sciences.
- Ramendra Kumar Yadav, 78, Indian politician, MP (1989–1991, 1992–2004).

=== 15 ===
- Mildred Allen, 91, American opera singer.
- Gary Berne, 77, American Olympic sport shooter.
- Nelly Reig Castellanos, 92, Paraguayan first lady (1989–1993).
- Jim Clendenen, 68, American vintner (Au Bon Climat).
- Fred Dellar, 89, British music journalist.
- Charles R. Doering, 65, American mathematician, esophageal cancer.
- Felicia Elizondo, 74, American transgender activist.
- Tim Falvey, 87, Irish politician, lord mayor of Cork (1994–1995).
- Deanna Milvia Frosini, 81, Italian painter and actress (Under the Sign of Scorpio, Wind from the East, Lettera aperta a un giornale della sera).
- Oliver Gillie, 83, British medical journalist and scientist, lymphocytic leukemia.
- David F. Hardwick, 87, Canadian pediatric pathologist and academic.
- M. Thomas Inge, 85, American comics scholar.
- Charlie Jackson, 85, American football player (Chicago Cardinals), complications from COVID-19.
- Sunil Jain, 58, Indian journalist, complications from COVID-19.
- Babak Khorramdin, 46, Iranian director and writer.
- Ivo Luís Knoll, 91, Brazilian politician, Santa Catarina MLA (1967–1971).
- Lim Heng Chek, 85, Malaysian Olympic swimmer (1956).
- George Little, 83, Scottish-born Canadian politician.
- Emily Mair, 92, Scottish-born New Zealand opera singer, pianist and vocal coach.
- Đorđe Marjanović, 89, Serbian singer.
- Fred Martinelli, 92, American Hall of Fame college football coach (Ashland University).
- Abdul Manan Niazi, 52–53, Afghan militant, leader of High Council of the Islamic Emirate of Afghanistan, shot
- Mario Pavone, 80, American jazz bassist.
- Carol Rudyard, 98, English-Australian visual artist.
- Roy Scammell, 88, British stuntman and actor (Alien, Willow, Flash Gordon).
- Karl Schleunes, 84, American Holocaust historian.
- John Rosolu Bankole Thompson, 84, Sierra Leonean jurist, judge of the Special Court (2002–2013) and chair of the Anti-corruption Commission (since 2018).
- Eva Wilma, 87, Brazilian actress (Alô, Doçura!, A Flea on the Scales, A Indomada), ovarian cancer.

=== 16 ===
- Nadia Al-Iraqia, 57, Iraqi actress (Africano), COVID-19.
- Anjan Bandyopadhyay, 55, Indian television journalist, complications from COVID-19.
- Stefan Banz, 60, Swiss artist, heart attack.
- William Berg, 82, American classicist.
- Lawrence M. Breed, 80, American APL computer scientist and early Burning Man contributor, Lewy body dementias.
- Patsy Bruce, 81, American country songwriter ("Mammas Don't Let Your Babies Grow Up to Be Cowboys").
- Marianne Burgman, 68, Dutch politician, mayor of Maarn (1995–2002) and De Ronde Venen (2002–2011).
- Mike Carter, 67, American politician, member of the Tennessee House of Representatives (since 2013), pancreatic cancer.
- Bruno Covas, 41, Brazilian politician, mayor of São Paulo (since 2018), deputy (2015–2017) and São Paulo MLA (2007–2011), gastric cancer.
- T. Frank Crigler, 85, American diplomat.
- Vera Deacon, 94, Australian historian.
- Tomer Eiges, 25, Israeli intelligence officer.
- Hüseyin Er, 36, Turkish-British footballer (İzmirspor), heart attack.
- Samir Hadjaoui, 42, Algerian footballer (ASO Chlef, ES Sétif, national team).
- Anatoliy Havrylov, 88, Ukrainian cinematographer, Shevchenko National Prize winner (1988).
- Rajendrasinh Jadeja, 66, Indian cricket player (Saurashtra) and umpire (BCCI), COVID-19.
- Chetan Karki, 83, Nepali songwriter and filmmaker, COVID-19.
- Nasim Wali Khan, 88, Pakistani politician, Khyber Pakhtunkhwa MPA (1977), complications from diabetes.
- Ailsa Land, 93, British mathematician.
- Jakov Lazaroski, 84, Macedonian political commissar, president of the League of Communists of Macedonia (1986–1989).
- MC Kevin, 23, Brazilian singer-songwriter, fall.
- Rildo da Costa Menezes, 79, Brazilian football player (Botafogo, national team) and manager (California Kickers).
- Boris Miranda, 37, Bolivian journalist and correspondent (BBC Mundo).
- Al Taib Mustafa, Sudanese journalist and politician, minister of state for communications, COVID-19.
- M. S. Narasimhan, 88, Indian mathematician (Narasimhan–Seshadri theorem).
- Raili Pietilä, 94, Finnish architect (Mäntyniemi).
- Richard L. Rubenstein, 97, American rabbi and writer.
- Sa'duddin, 59, Indonesian politician, regent of Bekasi (2007–2012), member of the People's Representative Council (2014–2016).
- Sangtiennoi Sor.Rungroj, 54, Thai Muay Thai fighter, suicide by gunshot.
- Rajeev Satav, 46, Indian politician, MP (2014–2019, since 2020), complications from COVID-19.
- Alessandro Talotti, 40, Italian Olympic high jumper (2004, 2008), stomach cancer.
- Akbar Torkan, 68, Iranian politician, minister of defense (1989–1993), minister of roads and transportation (1993–1997), senior advisor to the president (2013–2018).
- Ekaterina Vilmont, 75, Russian writer.
- Joe Walters, 81, English cricketer (Nottinghamshire).
- Jerzy Wilk, 66, Polish politician, mayor of Elbląg (2013–2014), deputy (since 2015).
- Vijay Singh Yadav, 67–68, Indian politician, Bihar MLA (1995–2000), MP (2000–2006), COVID-19.
- Rudolf Yanson, 82, Russian philologist.

=== 17 ===
- K. K. Aggarwal, 62, Indian cardiologist, COVID-19.
- Ian Brusasco, 92, Australian businessman and philanthropist.
- Kathryn Bullock, 75, American chemist.
- Bill Fagaly, 83, American art historian.
- Kabang, 13, Filipino dog.
- Don Kernodle, 71, American professional wrestler (Jim Crockett Promotions), suicide by gunshot.
- Nan Kinross, 94, New Zealand nurse and nursing academic.
- Bruno Kouamé, 93, Ivorian Roman Catholic prelate, bishop of Abengourou (1981–2003).
- Casildo Maldaner, 79, Brazilian politician, senator (since 2011) and governor of Santa Catarina (1990–1991), cancer.
- Jackie Matisse, 90, French artist.
- Joe Mercer, 86, English jockey.
- Amarendra Mohanty, 63, Indian music composer and singer, COVID-19.
- Robert Quackenbush, 91, American children's author.
- Ki. Rajanarayanan, 97, Indian folklorist and writer.
- Terence Riley, 66, American architect and museum curator, chief curator of architecture and design at the Museum of Modern Art (1992–2006).
- Buddy Roemer, 77, American politician, member of the U.S. House of Representatives (1981–1988), governor of Louisiana (1988–1992).
- Don Sakers, 62, American science fiction writer, heart attack.
- Jesús Santrich, 53, Colombian guerrilla leader (FARC) and politician, deputy (2006–2009), shot.
- Henry Schmidt, 85, American football player (San Francisco 49ers, San Diego Chargers, Buffalo Bills).
- Janet Shackleton, 92, New Zealand hurdler, British Empire Games bronze medallist (1950).
- Héctor Silva, 76, Argentine rugby union player (South American Jaguars) and coach (national team), COVID-19.
- Harold Small, 85, Canadian politician.
- K. Thurairetnasingam, 80, Sri Lankan politician, MP (2002–2010, 2015–2020), COVID-19.
- K. Thulasiah Vandayar, 92, Indian politician, MP (1991–1996).
- Nitish Veera, 45, Indian actor (Pudhupettai, Vennila Kabadi Kuzhu, Kaala), COVID-19.
- Sabino Vengco, 79, Filipino Roman Catholic priest, theologian, and author.
- Vivek Raj Wangkhem, Indian politician, Manipur MLA (2002–2007), general secretary of the National People's Party, COVID-19.
- Wolfgang Weiermann, 85, German politician, MP (1987–2002).
- Magdeleine Willame-Boonen, 80, Belgian politician, senator (1999–2003).
- Olavo Yépez, 83, Ecuadorian chess master, cancer.

=== 18 ===
- Abdul Khaleq Alghanem, 63, Saudi Arabian film and TV director (Tash ma Tash), prostate cancer.
- Franco Battiato, 76, Italian singer-songwriter ("I treni di Tozeur", "Centro di gravità permanente", "Cuccurucucù") and filmmaker, neurodegenerative disease.
- Viktor Belskiy, 66, Belarusian Olympic long jumper (1980).
- Effie Boggess, 93, American politician, member of the Iowa House of Representatives (1995–2005).
- Joe J. Christensen, 91, American Mormon leader, president of Ricks College (1985–1989), general authority (since 1989).
- Theodore John Conrad, 71, American bank embezzler.
- Bob Cullison, 84, American politician, member of the Oklahoma House of Representatives (1973–1979) and Senate (1979–1995).
- Esegé, 63, Spanish comic artist (Mortadelo, Mister K).
- Bernhard Friedmann, 89, German economist and politician, MP (1976–1990) and member of the European Court of Auditors (1990–2001).
- Vladimir Fyodorov, 82, Russian actor (Ruslan and Ludmila, Kin-dza-dza!, Heart of a Dog) and physicist.
- John Gomery, 88, Canadian jurist, justice of the Superior Court of Quebec (1982–2007).
- Charles Grodin, 86, American actor (The Heartbreak Kid, Midnight Run, Beethoven) and comedian, Emmy winner (1978), bone marrow cancer.
- Chaman Lal Gupta, 86, Indian politician, Jammu and Kashmir MLA (1972–1977) and MP (1996–2004), complications from COVID-19.
- Arthur Hills, 91, American golf course designer.
- John W. Jordan, 95, American politician.
- Vijay Kumar Kashyap, 56, Indian politician, Uttar Pradesh MLA (since 2017), COVID-19.
- Zsuzsanna Kézi, 76, Hungarian Olympic handball player, bronze medalist (1976).
- Kim Ho-seong, 51, South Korean voice actor.
- Ricardo Letts Colmenares, 83, Peruvian politician and journalist, founder of the Revolutionary Vanguard and congressman (1990–1992).
- Gilles Lupien, 67, Canadian ice hockey player (Montreal Canadiens, Pittsburgh Penguins, Hartford Whalers), Stanley Cup champion (1978, 1979), intestinal cancer.
- Hiroshi Maeda, 82, Japanese chemist, discoverer of the EPR effect, liver failure.
- Malibu Moon, 24, American racehorse and sire, heart attack.
- Gordon McMillan, 94, Canadian ice hockey player (Michigan Wolverines).
- Douglas Mossman, 88, American actor (Hawaii Five-O, Hawaiian Eye).
- Terry O'Dea, 76, Australian darts player.
- Goetz Oertel, 86, Polish-born American physicist.
- Albert Planasdemunt i Gubert, 91, Spanish politician, member of the Parliament of Catalonia (1980–1984).
- Farida Rahman, 75, Bangladeshi politician, MP (2009–2013).
- William C. Richardson, 81, American businessman.
- Chrissy Sharp, 73, Australian politician, member of the Western Australian Legislative Council (1997–2005).
- Thaddeus Spratlen, 90, American economist.
- Rennie Stennett, 72, Panamanian baseball player (Pittsburgh Pirates, San Francisco Giants), World Series champion (1979), cancer.
- Yolanda Tortolero, Venezuelan physician and politician, deputy (since 2016), complications from COVID-19.
- Yoshi Wada, 77, Japanese sound installation artist and musician.
- Genzō Wakayama, 88, Japanese voice actor (Astro Boy, Shin Takarajima, Kingdom Hearts), heart failure.
- Corinne Wood, 66, American politician, lieutenant governor of Illinois (1999–2003), complications from breast cancer.

=== 19 ===
- Darío Alessandro, 69, Argentine sociologist, politician and diplomat, deputy (1995–2003), ambassador to Cuba (2004–2007) and Peru (2008–2015), pancreatic cancer.
- Wiranto Arismunandar, 87, Indonesian academic, minister of education (1998).
- Johnny Ashcroft, 94, Australian country singer.
- Khadgajeet Baral, 93, Nepalese diplomat and police officer, inspector general (1972–1978).
- Odd Berg, 97, Norwegian Olympic road racing cyclist (1952).
- Bruno Bicocchi, 65, French Olympic sprint canoer.
- Gary Blodgett, 83, American politician, member of the Iowa House of Representatives (1993–2001).
- Daryle H. Busch, 93, American inorganic chemist.
- Pablo Calucho, 41, Bolivian journalist, COVID-19.
- Oscar Cavagnis, 47, Italian road racing cyclist, avalanche.
- Alix Dobkin, 80, American folk singer-songwriter, lesbian feminist activist and memoirist, brain aneurysm.
- Piet van Eijsden, 85, Dutch tennis player.
- Lee Evans, 74, American sprinter, double Olympic champion (1968), complications from a stroke.
- Serhiy Ferenchak, 37, Ukrainian footballer (Khimik Krasnoperekopsk, Sevastopol, SKChF Sevastopol).
- Josep Franch, 77, Spanish footballer (FC Barcelona, CE Sabadell FC).
- Vladimir Gerasimov, 89, Russian colonel general, 12th Chief Directorate (1985–1992).
- Martin Greenberg, 103, American poet.
- Charles C. Hagemeister, 74, American soldier, Medal of Honor recipient (1968).
- John Hodge, 92, British aerospace engineer, member of NASA Space Task Group, flight director.
- Esther A. Hopkins, 94, American chemist, environmental lawyer and civil servant.
- Quintin Jones, 41, American convicted murderer, execution by lethal injection.
- Alain Kirili, 74, French-American sculptor, leukemia.
- Zakpa Komenan, 76, Ivorian politician, minister of education and professional formation (1993–1999).
- David Anthony Kraft, 68, American comic book writer (The Defenders, Captain America), complications from COVID-19.
- Prasanta Mohapatra, 47, Indian cricketer (Odisha), COVID-19.
- Paul Mooney, 79, American actor (The Buddy Holly Story, Bamboozled), comedian (Chappelle's Show) and writer, heart attack.
- Robin Munro, 68, British human rights activist.
- Neville Myton, 74, Jamaican Olympic middle-distance runner (1964, 1968), cancer.
- Mark O'Brien, 82, American politician.
- Jagannath Pahadia, 89, Indian politician, chief minister of Rajasthan (1980–1981), governor of Bihar (1989–1990) and Haryana (2009–2014), COVID-19.
- Nicole Péllissard-Darrigrand, 89, French Olympic diver (1948, 1952, 1956, 1960).
- Aleksandr Privalov, 87, Russian biathlete, Olympic silver medallist (1964), heart attack.
- Tatyana Protsenko, 53, Russian actress (The Adventures of Buratino), cancer.
- Elisa Ruiz Díaz, 56, Paraguayan lawyer and diplomat, representative to the Organization of American States (since 2013) and chair of the OAS Permanent Council (since 2021) .
- Guillermo Sepúlveda, 86, Mexican footballer (Guadalajara, Oro, national team).
- Abubakar Shekau, 46–56, Nigerian Islamic militant, leader of Boko Haram (since 2009), suicide by explosive vest.
- John Tooze, 83, British biologist.
- Martin Turnovský, 92, Czech conductor.
- Aimé Verhoeven, 85, Belgian Olympic Greco-Roman wrestler (1960).
- Helmut Wopfner, 96, Austrian geologist.
- Wimar Witoelar, 75, Indonesian journalist and talk show host, presidential press secretary (1999–2001), complications from sepsis.
- Oğuz Yılmaz, 52, Turkish folk musician, heart attack.
- Mark York, 55, American actor (The Office).

=== 20 ===
- Nizamuddin Asir Adrawi, 95, Indian historian.
- Len Badger, 75, English footballer (Sheffield United).
- Francisco Brines, 89, Spanish poet and academic, Miguel de Cervantes Prize winner.
- Lori Burton, 80, American singer, songwriter and record producer.
- Chris Chilton, 77, English footballer (Hull City, Coventry City), complications from dementia.
- Glen E. Conrad, 71, American jurist, judge (since 2003) and chief judge (2010–2017) of the U.S. District Court for Western Virginia.
- Ingvar Cronhammar, 73, Swedish-Danish sculptor (Elia).
- Jesús Davoz, 89, Spanish road racing cyclist.
- Ion Dichiseanu, 87, Romanian actor (The Last Roman, Titanic Waltz, Mofturi 1900).
- Tommy Finn, 87, English rugby league player (Hull, St Helens).
- Ken Garland, 92, British graphic designer.
- Samir Ghanem, 84, Egyptian comedian, singer and entertainer, complications from COVID-19.
- Gregorio Gordo, 62, Spanish politician and trade unionist, member of the Assembly of Madrid (2007–2015), cancer.
- Khatib Haji, 58, Tanzanian politician, MP (since 2010).
- Roger Hawkins, 75, American drummer (Muscle Shoals Rhythm Section) and recording studio owner (Muscle Shoals Sound Studio).
- Gennady Igumnov, 84, Russian politician, governor of Perm Oblast (1996–2000).
- George F. Keane, 91, American investment professional.
- Anthony Lazzaro, 100, American academic administrator.
- Lubomír Ledl, 68, Czech politician, member of the Federal Assembly of Czechoslovakia (1990–1992).
- Phil Lombardi, 58, American baseball player (New York Yankees, New York Mets), complications from brain cancer.
- Margherita Marchione, 99, American Roman Catholic nun and writer.
- Robbie McCauley, 78, American playwright and actress.
- Freddy Marks, 71, English musician (Rod, Jane and Freddy) and actor.
- Moussa Narou N'Diaye, 86, Senegalese Olympic basketball player.
- Erin O'Brien, 87, American actress (John Paul Jones, Onionhead, Girl on the Run).
- Florian Pilkington-Miksa, 70, English rock drummer (Curved Air).
- Jerry Planutis, 91, American football player (Washington Redskins).
- John Powless, 88, American college basketball and tennis coach (Wisconsin Badgers).
- Sándor Puhl, 65, Hungarian football referee, complications from COVID-19.
- U. Visweswar Rao, Indian film director (Nagna Sathyam, Harischandrudu) and screenwriter, COVID-19.
- Tarannum Riyaz, 60, Indian writer, COVID-19.
- Rizuan Abdul Hamid, Malaysian businessman and politician, senator (since 2005) and chairman of Halal Development Corporation (since 2019), COVID-19.
- George Stranahan, 89, American physicist, complications from heart surgery and a stroke.
- Ray Thomas, 80, Australian footballer (Collingwood).
- Fred Tobias, 93, American songwriter ("Good Timin'", "Little Bitty Girl", "Born Too Late").
- Taygib Tolboyev, 65, Russian test pilot.
- Tshoganetso Tongwane, South African politician, MP (2008–2014, 2014–2019, since 2019), COVID-19.
- Mike Weatherley, 63, British politician, MP (2010–2015), lung cancer.
- Johan Weyts, 81, Belgian politician, member of the Flemish Parliament (1999–2004) and senator (1987–1999).
- Gary Wilson, 65, American anti-pornography activist.
- Eric Winstanley, 76, English footballer (Barnsley, Chesterfield).
- Zuo Hui, 50, Chinese real estate broker.

=== 21 ===
- Farhat Abdraimov, 55, Kazakh actor (Whoever Softer, Fara, Tale of Pink Hare), heart attack.
- Vitold Ashurak, 50, Belarusian activist and political prisoner, cardiac arrest.
- Ibrahim Attahiru, 54, Nigerian military officer, chief of Army staff (since 2021), plane crash.
- Sunderlal Bahuguna, 94, Indian environmentalist (Chipko movement), COVID-19.
- Om Prakash Bhardwaj, 79, Indian boxing coach.
- Ajoy Dey, 69, Indian politician, West Bengal MLA (1991–2016), COVID-19.
- Zdzisław Dobrucki, 76, Polish speedway rider (Unia Leszno).
- John A. Hemphill, 93, American major general.
- Roman Kent, 92, Polish-born American Holocaust survivor, president of the International Auschwitz Committee.
- Rajkumar Keswani, 70, Indian journalist, complications from COVID-19.
- Rana Kharkongor, 69, Indian singer and video director, COVID-19.
- Heikki Koort, 66, Estonian film actor, karateka and diplomat.
- Krishna, 79, Indian politician, MP (1996–1998), member (1985–1989, 1994–1996, 2006–2008) and speaker (2004–2008) of the Karnataka Legislative Assembly.
- Abdulrahman Kuliya, 53, Nigerian military office, plane crash.
- Thomas B. Leary, 89, American attorney, commissioner of the Federal Trade Commission (1999–2005).
- Mark Levitan, 73, American academic, complications from leukemia.
- Ken MacKinnon, 87, Scottish Gaelic sociolinguist.
- Usman Mansoorpuri, 76, Indian Islamic scholar, COVID-19.
- Loisette M. Marsh, 92, Canadian-born Australian marine biologist.
- Sakti Mazumdar, 89, Indian Olympic boxer (1952), heart attack.
- Walter Müller, German Olympic gymnast (1952).
- Dieter Neuendorf, 80, German Olympic ski jumper.
- Merv Norrish, 94, New Zealand diplomat, ambassador to the United States (1978–1980).
- Manfred Ommer, 70, German Olympic sprinter (1972).
- Babagouda Patil, 76, Indian politician, minister of rural development (1998–1999).
- Tahir Salahov, 92, Azerbaijani painter and draughtsman, first secretary of the Artists' Union of the USSR (1973–1992), vice president of the Russian Academy of Arts.
- Dwayne Sandy, 32, Saint Vincent footballer (Pastures United FC, Avenues United FC, national team), shot.
- Harvey Schlossberg, 85, American police officer.
- Lisa Shaw, 44, British radio presenter and journalist, brain haemorrhage.
- Klemen Tinal, 50, Indonesian politician, vice governor of Papua (since 2013).
- Stephen Zappala Sr., 88, American jurist, justice (1983–2002) and chief justice (2001–2002) of the Supreme Court of Pennsylvania.

=== 22 ===
- Francesc Arnau, 46, Spanish football player (Barcelona, Málaga) and executive (Real Oviedo), suicide by train.
- Benjamin Ayimba, 44, Kenyan rugby union player (Nondescripts RFC, Cornish Pirates) and coach (national sevens team), cerebral malaria.
- Joe Beckwith, 66, American baseball player (Los Angeles Dodgers, Kansas City Royals), World Series champion (1985), colon cancer.
- Colette Brull-Ulmann, 101, French physician, pediatrician, and Resistance fighter.
- Jacqueline Caurat, 93, French television presenter, journalist and actress (Mon pote le gitan).
- Anna Maria Cecchi, 78, Italian Olympic swimmer (1960, 1964).
- Charles G. Cleveland, 93, American lieutenant general.
- David Danielson, 74, American politician, member of the New Hampshire House of Representatives (since 2013), cancer.
- Iain R. Edgar, 72, British social anthropologist.
- Peter Fish, 65, American composer.
- Fred Ford, 83, American football player (Buffalo Bills, Los Angeles Chargers).
- Sister Loyola Galvin, 99, New Zealand nun, nurse and gardener.
- Jorge García Carneiro, 69, Venezuelan politician, governor of Vargas (since 2008) and minister of defense (2004–2006), heart attack.
- Mels Kenetaev, 75, Kazakh footballer (Dinamo Tselinograd).
- Harold Lambert, 99, Australian footballer (Essendon).
- Jorge Larrañaga, 64, Uruguayan politician, senator (2000–2020) and minister of the interior (since 2020), heart attack.
- Charles R. Larson, 83, American scholar.
- R. S. Lugani, 94, Indian educator.
- Syamsuddin Mahmud, 86, Indonesian economist and politician, governor of Aceh (1993–2000), COVID-19.
- Robert Marchand, 109, French racing cyclist.
- Cornelia Oberlander, 99, Canadian landscape architect, COVID-19.
- Raamlaxman, 78, Indian composer (Maine Pyar Kiya, Hum Aapke Hain Koun..!, Hum Saath-Saath Hain), heart attack.
- André Ribeiro, 55, Brazilian racing driver (CART), bowel cancer.
- Sophie Rivera, 82, American photographer.
- David Shotter, 82, British archaeologist.
- Y. C. Simhadri, 80, Indian academic administrator, vice-chancellor of Banaras Hindu University (1997–2002), COVID-19.
- Jiřina Šiklová, 85, Czech sociologist and political dissident, Charter 77 signatory. (death announced on this date)
- Pavol Szikora, 69, Slovak Olympic race walker (1988, 1992).
- Marek Trončinský, 32, Czech ice hockey player (Progym Gheorgheni, Bílí Tygři Liberec, Sheffield Steelers).
- Glenn Douglas Tubb, 85, American singer-songwriter ("Skip a Rope", "Two Story House").
- Mario Vascellari, 69, Italian basketball player.
- Wu Mengchao, 98, Chinese hepatobiliary surgeon, member of the Chinese Academy of Sciences.
- Yuan Longping, 90, Chinese agronomist, member of the Chinese Academy of Engineering, multiple organ failure.
- Connie Zelencik, 66, American football player (Buffalo Bills).
- Eddy Zemach, 85–86, Israeli philosopher.
- Chinese marathon runners killed in the Gansu ultramarathon disaster:
  - Huang Guanjun, 34
  - Liang Jing, 31

=== 23 ===
- Dennis A'Court, 83, Welsh cricketer (Gloucestershire).
- Abel Almarez, 79, Argentine Olympic boxer.
- Srikumar Banerjee, 75, Indian metallurgical engineer, director of BARC (2004–2010) and chairman of the Atomic Energy Commission (2009–2012), heart attack.
- Baby Barredo, 80, Filipino theater actress and producer, complications from sepsis.
- Frithjof Bergmann, 90, German philosopher, founder of the New Work movement.
- Dewayne Blackwell, 84, American songwriter ("Friends in Low Places", "Mr. Blue").
- Charles Boutin, 79, American politician and administrative law judge, mayor of Aberdeen, Maryland (1994–1998) and member of the Maryland House of Delegates (1999–2005).
- José Agusto Briones, 60, Ecuadorian politician, minister of energy and non-renewable natural resources (2019–2020), suicide by hanging.
- Eric Carle, 91, American writer and illustrator (The Very Hungry Caterpillar, The Grouchy Ladybug, Brown Bear, Brown Bear, What Do You See?), kidney failure.
- Barney Curley, 81, Irish horse trainer and gambler (Yellow Sam betting coup).
- Lorrae Desmond, 91, Australian singer, television presenter (The Lorrae Desmond Show) and actress (A Country Practice, Arcade).
- Aly Doerfel, 71, Luxembourgish Olympic fencer (1972).
- Bob Fulton, 73, English-born Australian rugby league player and coach (Manly-Warringah, Eastern Suburbs, national team), cancer.
- Alan Garside, 94, Australian footballer (national team).
- Milton Moses Ginsberg, 85, American film director (Coming Apart, The Werewolf of Washington), cancer.
- Cristóbal Halffter, 91, Spanish classical composer and conductor.
- Charles Hamlin, 74, American Olympic rower (1968).
- James Harman, 74, American harmonica player and singer-songwriter, heart attack.
- Malik Dohan al-Hassan, 101, Iraqi politician, minister of justice (2004–2005).
- Ron Hill, 82, English Olympic marathon runner (1964, 1972).
- Richard R. G. Hobson, 89, American politician, member of the Virginia House of Delegates (1976–1980).
- Amolak Chand Jain, 92, Indian scientist.
- Paulo Mendes da Rocha, 92, Brazilian architect (Estádio Serra Dourada, Pinacoteca do Estado, National Coach Museum), Pritzker Prize winner (2006).
- Ahmed Mestiri, 95, Tunisian lawyer and politician, minister of the interior (1970–1971), defence (1966–1968) and justice (1956–1958).
- Max Mosley, 81, British racing driver and lawyer, president of the FIA (1993–2009), suicide by gunshot.
- Makoto Nagao, 84, Japanese computer scientist, president of Kyoto University (1997–2003), stroke.
- John Waddington Oakes, 88, British law enforcement officer and Olympic alpine skier (1960), high sheriff of Warwickshire (1996).
- Luiz Gonzaga Paes Landim, 79, Brazilian politician, Piauí MLA (1979–1991), COVID-19.
- Shanti Pahadia, 86, Indian politician, MP (1984–1990), COVID-19.
- Lionel Platts, 86, English golfer.
- Alex Salaueu, 94, Belarusian artist.
- Nina Shatskaya, 81, Russian actress (Welcome, or No Trespassing, A Man Before His Time, Visit to Minotaur), COVID-19.
- Ross Taylor, 95, New Zealand geochemist and planetary scientist.
- Douglas Winston, 89, Australian Olympic sprinter (1956).

=== 24 ===
- Cabo Almi, 58, Brazilian politician, Mato Grosso MLA (since 2011), complications from COVID-19.
- Josep Almudéver Mateu, 101, French veteran of the Spanish Civil War (CXXIX International Brigade).
- Aung Toe, 96, Burmese jurist, chief justice of the Supreme Court (1988–2011).
- Paul Christy, 82, American professional wrestler (NWA, ICW, WWF).
- Russell Church, 90, American psychologist.
- John Davis, 66, American singer (Milli Vanilli, The Real Milli Vanilli), COVID-19.
- Aldo Forbice, 80, Italian radio host.
- Keith Foulger, 96, British naval architect, colorectal cancer.
- Dan Frank, 67, American editor (Pantheon Books).
- Banira Giri, 75, Nepalese poet, heart attack and COVID-19.
- Desiree Gould, 76, American actress (Sleepaway Camp).
- Robert Green Hall, 47, American makeup artist (Angel, Buffy the Vampire Slayer) and film director (Laid to Rest).
- Anna Halprin, 100, American choreographer.
- Jeetmal Khant, 58, Indian politician, Rajasthan MLA (2013–2018), COVID-19.
- Eugene Marve, 60, American football player (Buffalo Bills, Tampa Bay Buccaneers, San Diego Chargers).
- Hazen Myers, 86, Canadian politician, New Brunswick MLA (1978–1987).
- Henri Paris, 85, French general.
- Milan Puzrla, 75, Czech Olympic cyclist (1968, 1972, 1976).
- Ron Rhodes, 88, Australian footballer (Carlton).
- Najeeb Qahtan al-Shaabi, 67–68, Yemeni politician, COVID-19.
- Aditya Shastri, 57, Indian academic, complications from COVID-19.
- Habibullah Siraji, 72, Bangladeshi poet, director general of the Bangla Academy (since 2018).
- Lyubov Talalaeva, 68, Russian rower, Olympic silver medallist (1976).
- Beverly White, 92, American politician, member of the Utah House of Representatives (1971–1991), longest serving female member of the Utah State Legislature.
- Samuel E. Wright, 74, American actor (The Little Mermaid, Dinosaur) and singer ("Under the Sea"), prostate cancer.
- Marinette Yetna, 55, Cameroonian politician, deputy (since 2020).

=== 25 ===
- Alfonso Barasoain, 63, Spanish football player and manager (Barakaldo, Eibar, Lemona).
- Felix Boehm, 96, Swiss-American experimental physicist.
- Rod Breedlove, 83, American football player (Washington Redskins, Pittsburgh Steelers).
- Jáchym Bulín, 86, Czech Olympic ski jumper (1956).
- Pete Correll, 80, American businessman, CEO-emeritus of Georgia-Pacific (1993–2005).
- Richard Dixon, 90, British chemist.
- Lois Ehlert, 86, American children's author and illustrator (Chicka Chicka Boom Boom).
- Johnny Everard, 97, Irish hurler (Moyne-Templetuohy, Tipperary) and Gaelic footballer.
- David Foot, 92, English journalist and historian.
- Arturo Gentili, 85, Italian footballer (Atalanta B.C., Varese Calcio, Triestina Calcio).
- Sir Roger Gifford, 65, English banker and philanthropist, lord mayor of London (2012–2013).
- Gregory Peter XX Ghabroyan, 86, Syrian-born Lebanese Armenian Catholic hierarch, catholicos patriarch of Cilicia (since 2015).
- Krishne Gowda, 80, Indian actor and performer, cardiac arrest.
- Michael Hudson, 82, American political scientist.
- Cotton Ivy, 91, American politician, member of the Tennessee House of Representatives (1985–1989).
- Padmanabh Jaini, 97, Indian-born American Jainist and Buddhist scholar.
- Ib Georg Jensen, 93, Danish ceramist, designer, and author.
- Esmail Khoi, 83, Iranian poet and writer.
- Tõnu Kilgas, 66, Estonian baritone and actor (Rahu tänav, Those Old Love Letters), cancer.
- David Klein, 86, Israeli economist, governor of the Bank of Israel (2000–2005).
- John Lynch, 74, Australian linguist.
- Juan Máximo Martínez, 74, Mexican Olympic long-distance runner (1968, 1972), cancer.
- Eilat Mazar, 64, Israeli archaeologist.
- José Melitón Chávez, 63, Argentine Roman Catholic prelate, bishop of Añatuya (2015–2019) and Concepción (since 2020), COVID-19.
- Bobby Mohammed, 78, Trinidadian pannist.
- Elisapee Ootoova, 90, Canadian Inuk elder. (death announced on this date)
- George Patterson, 86, English footballer (Hull City, York City).
- David Pole, 95, English health economist.
- Robert Ridder, 94, American politician, member of the Washington State Senate (1967–1973).
- J. D. Roberts, 88, American football player and coach (New Orleans Saints).
- Eva Sereny, 86, Swiss photographer and film director (Foreign Student).
- Amichai Shoham, 99, Israeli footballer (Hapoel Petah Tikva F.C., national team).
- John Warner, 94, American politician, senator (1979–2009), secretary of the Navy (1972–1974), heart failure.
- Rusty Warren, 91, American comedian and singer (Knockers Up!).

=== 26 ===
- Abdul Wahab Al-Dailami, 82–83, Yemeni politician, minister of justice (1994–1997), COVID-19.
- Adrián Babič, 24, Slovak touring cyclist, traffic collision.
- Armand Bissen, 91, Luxembourgish Olympic footballer.
- Jan Borgman, 91, Dutch astronomer.
- Roser Bru, 98, Spanish-born Chilean painter and engraver.
- Tarcisio Burgnich, 82, Italian football player (Inter Milan, Napoli, national team) and manager.
- Chen Qingru, 94, Chinese scientist, member of the Chinese Academy of Engineering.
- Vincent Daly, 73, Irish Gaelic footballer (Longford GAA).
- Arturo de Jesús Correa Toro, 80, Colombian Roman Catholic prelate, bishop of Ipiales (2000–2018), COVID-19.
- H. S. Doreswamy, 103, Indian journalist and independence activist, cardiac arrest.
- Murray Dowey, 95, Canadian ice hockey player, Olympic champion (1948).
- Sir Llew Edwards, 85, Australian politician, deputy premier and treasurer of Queensland (1978–1983).
- Heidi Ferrer, 50, American screenwriter (The Hottie and the Nottie, Princess) and television writer (Dawson's Creek), suicide.
- Sondra Gilman, 94, American art curator.
- Alastair Hanton, 94, British banker, inventor of the direct debit system.
- Jerome Hellman, 92, American film producer (Midnight Cowboy, The Mosquito Coast, Coming Home), Oscar winner (1970).
- Kenneth Kaye, 75, American psychologist and writer.
- Ben Kruger, 64, South African actor and author (A Case of Murder, Silent Witness, Binnelanders), complications from COVID-19.
- Kay Lahusen, 91, American photographer and LGBT rights activist.
- Earle Louder, 88, American euphonium player.
- Arturo Luz, 94, Filipino sculptor and printmaker.
- Greg MacIsaac, 75, Canadian politician.
- Therese McKinley, 93, American baseball player (Muskegon Lassies).
- Majendra Narzary, 68, Indian politician, Assam MLA (since 2006), complications from COVID-19.
- Ranjita Rane, 43, Indian cricketer (Mumbai), cancer.
- Mufti Abdul Razzaq, 95, Indian Muslim scholar.
- Elisabeth Rechlin, 91, German Olympic swimmer (1952).
- Ren Farong, 84, Chinese Taoist priest and politician, MP (1993–2018), venerable master of the Chinese Taoist Association (2005–2015).
- Kunjulekshmi Saradamoni, 93, Indian historian and economist, president of the National Federation of Indian Women (2002–2008).
- Henry Sayler, 100, American politician, member of the Florida Senate (1967–1971, 1973–1978).
- Gottfried Schär, 84, Swiss Olympic rower.
- Sureni Senarath, 61, Sri Lankan actress (Surapurata Kanyaviyak, Aathma Warusha, Yalu Malu Yalu 2).
- Tom Shannon, 82, American disk jockey (WKBW, CKLW), songwriter ("Wild Weekend") and musician (The Rebels), pancreatic cancer.
- Patrick Sky, 80, American singer-songwriter.
- Llew Smith, 77, Welsh politician, MEP (1984–1994) and MP (1992–2005), cancer.
- Paul Soles, 90, Canadian actor (Spider-Man, Rudolph the Red-Nosed Reindeer, Redwall).
- Yutaka Takahasi, 93, Japanese engineer.
- Sze-Piao Yang, 100, Taiwanese pulmonologist.
- Red Top Young, 85, American musician.

=== 27 ===
- Shane Briant, 74, British actor (Demons of the Mind, Frankenstein and the Monster from Hell, Captain Kronos – Vampire Hunter).
- Violetta Elvin, 97, Russian prima ballerina and actress.
- Carla Fracci, 84, Italian ballet dancer and actress, cancer.
- Foster Friess, 81, American investment manager.
- Andy Gemmell, 75, Scottish footballer (Bradford City).
- Karl-Heinz Heddergott, 94, German football manager (FC Köln, Egypt national team, Oman national team).
- Robert Hogan, 87, American actor (The Lady in Red, Species II, Youth in Oregon), complications from pneumonia.
- Kees de Jager, 100, Dutch astronomer.
- Lorina Kamburova, 29, Bulgarian actress (Nightworld, Leatherface, Doom: Annihilation) and singer, pneumonia.
- Shantiraj Khosla, 54, Indian composer, COVID-19.
- Jaime Lerner, 83, Brazilian architect, urban planner and politician, governor of Paraná (1995–2002), mayor of Curitiba (1971–1974, 1979–1983, 1989–1992), kidney disease.
- Mohan Raj Malla, Nepalese politician, governor of Sudurpashchim Province (2019), COVID-19.
- Peter Millett, Baron Millett, 88, British jurist and life peer, Lord of Appeal in Ordinary (1998–2004) and non-permanent judge of the Hong Kong Court of Final Appeal (since 2000).
- María Teresa Miras Portugal, 73, Spanish biochemist, cancer.
- Vladilen Nikitin, 84, Russian politician, Soviet minister of agriculture (1985) and first deputy chairman of the Council of Ministers (1989–1990). (death announced on this date)
- František Reich, 91, Slovak Olympic rower (1952, 1956).
- Patricio Rojas, 88, Chilean physician, surgeon and politician, minister of the interior (1969–1970) and national defence (1990–1994).
- Nicos A. Rolandis, 86, Cypriot politician, minister of foreign affairs (1978–1983) and deputy (1991–1996).
- Nelson Sargento, 96, Brazilian samba musician (Estação Primeira de Mangueira), COVID-19.
- Poul Schlüter, 92, Danish politician, prime minister (1982–1993), minister of justice (1989), and MEP (1994–1999).
- Jay Sydeman, 93, American composer.
- John Roper-Curzon, 20th Baron Teynham, 92, British peer, member of the House of Lords (1972–1999).
- Zdenko Vukasović, 79, Croatian footballer (Anderlecht, Cercle Brugge, Lokeren).
- Steef Weijers, 91, Dutch politician, member of the Second Chamber (1970–1972, 1975–1989).
- Norman Weissman, 96, American documentary writer, director and producer.
- K. C. Yadav, 84, Indian historian, heart attack.

=== 28 ===
- Zohra Abdullayeva, 68, Azerbaijani musician.
- Resurreccion Acop, 73, Filipino doctor and politician, representative (since 2019), COVID-19.
- Zablon Amanaka, 45, Kenyan footballer (Željezničar Sarajevo, Mahakama, national team).
- Jim Beirne, 74, American football player (Houston Oilers, San Diego Chargers).
- Jimi Bellmartin, 71, Dutch singer.
- Esther Brown, 67, British pensioner, beaten.
- William F. Clinger Jr., 92, American politician, member of the U.S. House of Representatives (1979–1997) and chair of the House Oversight Committee (1995–1997).
- Mark Eaton, 64, American basketball player (Utah Jazz), bicycle crash.
- Markus Egen, 93, German Olympic ice hockey player (1952, 1956, 1960).
- Fujie Eguchi, 88, Japanese table tennis player, pancreatic cancer.
- Henrik Enderlein, 46, German economist and political scientist, complications from melanoma.
- T. M. Kaliannan Gounder, 100, Indian politician, MP (1950–1952) and Tamil Nadu MLA (1952–1967).
- He Zhaowu, 99, Chinese historian, translator, and professor at Tsinghua University.
- Viktor Hvozd, 61, Ukrainian intelligence officer, drowned.
- Paul Johnsgard, 89, American ornithologist.
- Rina Katselli, 83, Cypriot playwright and politician, member of the House of Representatives (1981–1996).
- Mumtaz Ahmed Khan, 85, Indian humanitarian.
- Albert Kookesh, 72, American politician, member of the Alaska House of Representatives (1997–2005) and Senate (2005–2013).
- Joseph Nunzio Latino, 83, American Roman Catholic prelate, bishop of Jackson (2003–2013).
- Bob Lombardi, 82, American football coach.
- Tony Marino, 90, American professional wrestler (WWWF, NWA).
- Archie Matsos, 86, American football player (Buffalo Bills, Oakland Raiders, Denver Broncos).
- Ken McElligott, 81, Australian politician, Queensland MLA (1983–1998).
- Barbara Ossenkopp, 78, German actress (Seduction: The Cruel Woman, Dem Täter auf der Spur, Mozart und Meisel).
- Pragmulji III, 85, Indian royal, maharao of Kutch (since 1991), complications of COVID-19.
- Rosslyn Range, 87, American long jumper.
- Henryk Samsonowicz, 91, Polish historian, minister of education (1988–1991).
- Benoît Sokal, 66, Belgian comics artist (Inspector Canardo) and video game developer (Syberia, Sinking Island).
- Christopher Taylor, 85, British landscape archaeologist.
- Lynne H. Walling, 62, American mathematician.
- Emma Shannon Walser, 91, Liberian lawyer and jurist.
- Zhang Kaiyuan, 94, Chinese historian, president of CCNU (1984–1990).

=== 29 ===
- Munirathna Anandakrishnan, 92, Indian civil engineer, vice-chancellor of Anna University (1990–1996), COVID-19.
- Francis J. Bradley, 85, American health physicist.
- Maurice Capovilla, 85, Brazilian film director (The Prophet of Hunger, The Night of the Scarecrow, O Jogo da Vida) and screenwriter.
- Judith Godwin, 91, American painter.
- John Gregg, 82, Australian actor (Armchair Thriller, Bodyline, Heatwave).
- Richard Groth, 75, American politician.
- Marcell Jankovics, 79, Hungarian animator and film director (Johnny Corncob, Sisyphus, The Struggle).
- Dani Karavan, 90, Israeli sculptor (Monument to the Negev Brigade).
- Johan von Koskull, 56, Finnish Olympic sailor (1984, 1988).
- Forrest Lothrop, 96, American college football coach (Dickinson State).
- Gavin MacLeod, 90, American actor (The Love Boat, The Mary Tyler Moore Show, McHale's Navy).
- Ian Marsh, 65, Australian footballer (Essendon), cancer.
- Thomas Mathiesen, 87, Norwegian sociologist.
- Paolo Maurensig, 78, Italian novelist.
- Charles F. McDevitt, 89, American judge and politician, member of the Idaho House of Representatives (1962–1966).
- Keith Mullings, 53, Jamaican boxer, WBC super welterweight champion (1997–1999).
- Abner Oakes, 87, Canadian-born American ice hockey player (Dartmouth) and coach.
- Kenzo Oshima, 78, Japanese diplomat, United Nations under-secretary-general for humanitarian affairs and emergency relief coordinator (2001–2003), heart attack.
- Ljubica Ostojić, 76, Bosnian poet and playwright.
- Hossam Al-Sabah, 73, Lebanese actor, traffic collision.
- Leonid Ivanovich Shcherbakov, 84, Russian military officer.
- Cornelius Sim, 69, Bruneian Roman Catholic cardinal, apostolic vicar of Brunei Darussalam (since 2005), cardiac arrest.
- Venkat Subha, Indian actor (Kattappava Kanom, Kazhugu 2, Gorilla), COVID-19.
- B. J. Thomas, 78, American singer ("Raindrops Keep Fallin' on My Head", "Another Somebody Done Somebody Wrong Song", "Hooked on a Feeling"), five-time Grammy winner, lung cancer.
- Johnny Trudell, 82, American composer and jazz trumpeter.
- Americans who died in the 2021 Percy Priest Lake Cessna Citation crash:
  - Joe Lara, 58, American actor (American Cyborg: Steel Warrior, Steel Frontier, Tarzan: The Epic Adventures).
  - Gwen Shamblin Lara, 66, writer and dietician (Christian diet programs).

=== 30 ===
- Chester Apy, 89, American politician, member of the New Jersey General Assembly (1968–1970, 1972–1974).
- Tonnie van As, 93, Dutch footballer (SBV Vitesse).
- Mikhail Beregovoy, 103, Russian military officer.
- Andriy Beshta, 44, Ukrainian politician and diplomat, ambassador to Thailand (since 2015), heart attack.
- John Carpenter, 84, Irish football referee.
- Jacke Davis, 85, American baseball player (Philadelphia Phillies).
- Ralph Davis, 82, American basketball player (Cincinnati Royals, Chicago Packers).
- Jason Dupasquier, 19, Swiss motorcycle road racer, competition crash.
- Harussani Zakaria, 82, Malaysian Islamic scholar and Perak mufti, COVID-19.
- Asei Kobayashi, 88, Japanese composer (Wolf Boy Ken, The King Kong Show, Tekkaman: The Space Knight), heart failure.
- Muriel Kovitz, 95, Canadian academic.
- Claude Landini, 95, Swiss Olympic basketball player (1948).
- Neville Meaney, 88, Australian historian.
- Rick Mitchell, 66, Australian sprinter, Olympic silver medalist (1980), prostate cancer.
- Frank Navarro, 91, American college football player (Maryland Terrapins) and coach (Williams Ephs, Princeton Tigers).
- Parminder Singh Saini, 63, Kenyan Olympic field hockey player (1984, 1988).
- Baddegama Samitha Thero, 68, Sri Lankan monk and politician, MP (1997–2004), COVID-19.
- Mythili Sivaraman, 81, Indian women's rights activist, COVID-19.
- Ingo Sick, 82, Swiss experimental nuclear physicist, stomach cancer.
- P. W. T. Simanjuntak, 85, Indonesian Lutheran priest, MP (1967–1971).
- Choudhary Khush Akhtar Subhani, Pakistani politician, Punjab MPA (since 2018).
- George Tintor, 64, Canadian Olympic rower (1976).
- Håvard Tveite, 59, Norwegian orienteer.

=== 31 ===
- Colin Appleton, 85, English football player (Leicester City, Charlton Athletic) and manager (Swansea City).
- Hugo Bakker, 35, Dutch organist and music educator.
- Dave Barsley, 81, Australian rugby league player (Western Suburbs, Newtown).
- Andreea Bollengier, 46, Romanian-born French chess player, Woman International Master (2000).
- Romain Bouteille, 84, French playwright and actor.
- Peter G. Christie, 80, Canadian politician.
- James Crawford, 72, Australian jurist, judge of the International Court of Justice (since 2015).
- Edward Cronk, 84, British Olympic sprint canoeist.
- Peter Del Monte, 77, Italian film director (Traveling Companion, Etoile, Julia and Julia) and screenwriter.
- Arlene Golonka, 85, American actress (Mayberry R.F.D., The In-Laws, Hang 'Em High).
- Albert Krivchenko, 85, Russian politician and journalist, governor of Amur Oblast (1991–1993).
- Lil Loaded, 20, American rapper and internet personality, suicide by gunshot.
- Robert Low, 71, Scottish author (The Whale Road, The Wolf Sea, The Lion Wakes) and journalist.
- Mike Marshall, 78, American baseball player (Los Angeles Dodgers, Montreal Expos, Minnesota Twins), complications from Alzheimer's disease.
- Sérgio Mascarenhas de Oliveira, 93, Brazilian physicist and educator.
- Istvan Raskovy, 84, Australian Olympic Greco-Roman wrestler (1964).
- Laxmikant Sharma, 60, Indian politician, Madhya Pradesh minister for education, leader of Bharatiya Janata Party, COVID-19.
- Hemendra Singh Banera, 75, Indian politician, MP (1971–1977, 1989–1991), COVID-19.
