= K. M. Hamsa Kunju =

Indian politician (1941–2021)

Deputy Speaker of the Kerala Legislative Assembly
- In office 30 June 1982 – 7 October 1986
- Preceded by: M. J. Zacharias
- Succeeded by: Korambayil Ahamed Haji

Member of the Kerala Legislative Assembly

Personal details
- Born: 14 May 1941
- Died: 13 May 2021 (aged 79)
- Party: I. U. M. L.

K. M. Hamsa Kunju (14 May 1941 – 13 May 2021) was an Indian politician. As a member of the Indian Union Muslim League, he served in the Kerala Legislative Assembly and was its Deputy Speaker from 1982 to 1986.
