= Hugo Bakker =

Dutch organist and music educator (1985–2021)

- Born: June 16, 1985; Gouda, Netherlands
- Died: 31 May 2021 (aged 35)
- Occupations: Organist, historian and music educator

Hugo Bakker (16 June 1985 – 31 May 2021) was a Dutch historian, organist, music publisher and music educator. He also had a Master's degree as harpsichordist. In 2017, Bakker recorded a CD in the Grote of Sint-Maartenskerk (Zaltbommel) with pieces by Johann Sebastian Bach, but also by 20th-century composers such as the Hungarian György Kurtág and the Peter-Jan Wagemans. Bakker won prizes at competitions in Maassluis and in the Italian Pistoia. In 2014, he was awarded the Sweelinck-Muller Prize for his special contribution to organ culture in the Netherlands. Hugo Bakker also was Until his death he was organist at the Grote of Sint-Maartenskerk (Zaltbommel).

He was the founder and owner of the music publishing house Valeur Ajoutée.

Hugo Bakker was the first organist of Netherlands who went into schools with a Do-organ of the Orgelkids movement.

Bakker died on 31 May 2021, aged 35.
