= Francisco Pelló Hernandis =

Argentine painter (1935–2021)

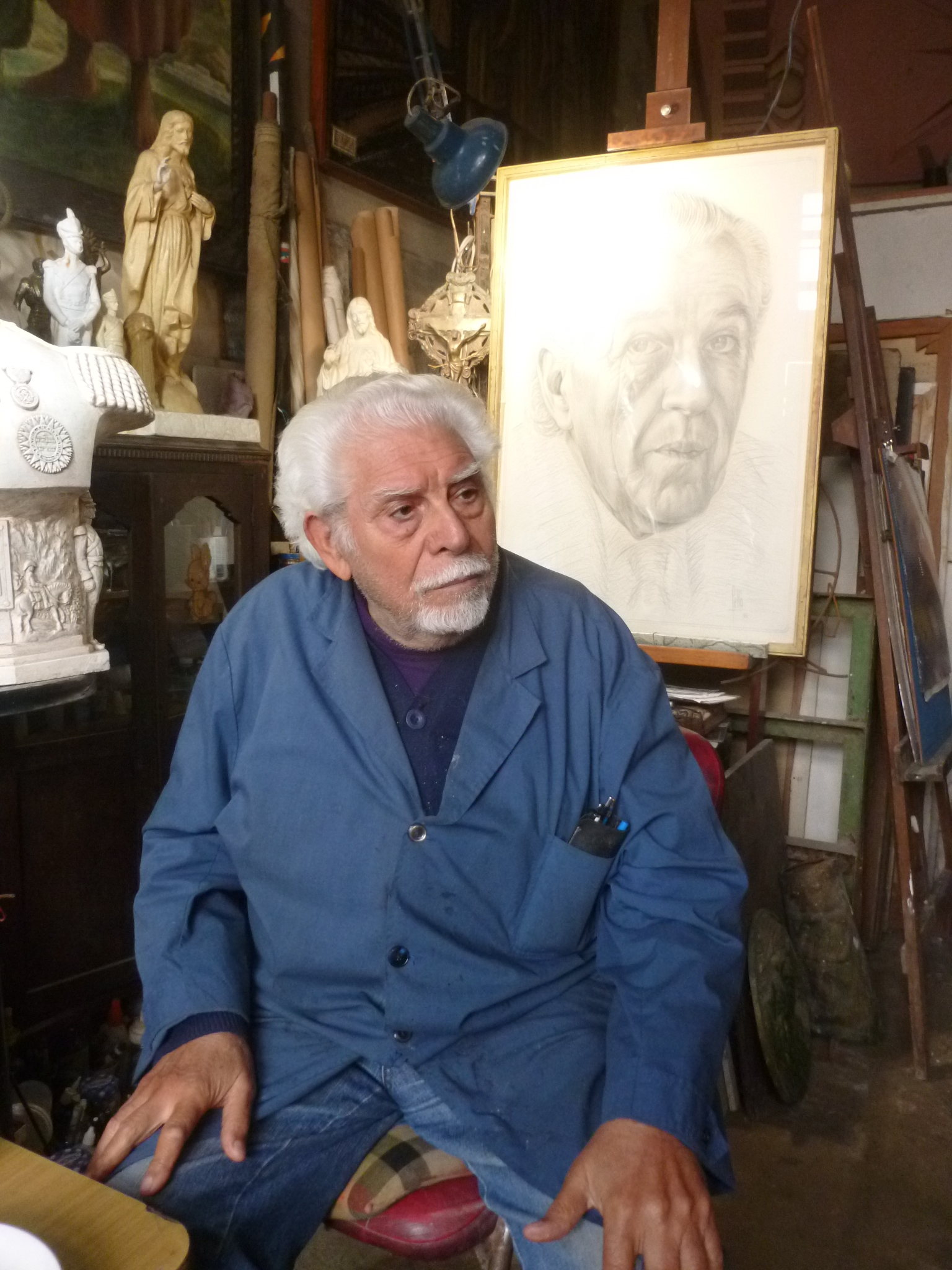
Francisco Pelló Hernandis

Francisco Pelló Hernandis (12 August 1935 – 12 May 2021) was a Spanish-born Argentine painter, sculptor, and poet.

== Awards and honors ==
- Medalla de Plata del certamen de pintura de Amigos del Arte, Rosario, 1951.
- Premio Nacional de Excelencia Humana, 1999.
- Premio «El ceibo de la amistad rioplatense» del Rotary International, Montevideo, 2000.
- «Artista distinguido de la ciudad de Rosario» del Consejo Municipal de la Ciudad, 2005.
- «“Santafesino Notable”» de la Cámara de Diputados de la provincia de Santa Fe, 2014.
