= Paul Chomat =

French politician (1938–2021)

Member of the French National Assembly
- In office 2 July 1981 – 14 May 1988
- Preceded by: Michel Durafour
- Succeeded by: Jean-Pierre Philibert
- Constituency: Loire's 1st constituency

Deputy Mayor of Saint-Étienne
- In office 1977–1983

General Councilor of the Canton of Saint-Étienne-Nord-Est-2
- In office 1976–2001

Personal details
- Born: 9 January 1938 Saint-Étienne, France
- Died: 5 May 2021 (aged 83) Saint-Étienne, France
- Party: PCF

Paul Chomat (9 January 1938 – 5 May 2021) was a French politician. A member of the French Communist Party, he served on the National Assembly from 1981 to 1988. He was also Deputy Mayor of Saint-Étienne from 1977 to 1983 and General Councilor of the Canton of Saint-Étienne-Nord-Est-2 from 1976 to 2001.
