= Ekaterina Vilmont =

Russian writer (1946–2021)

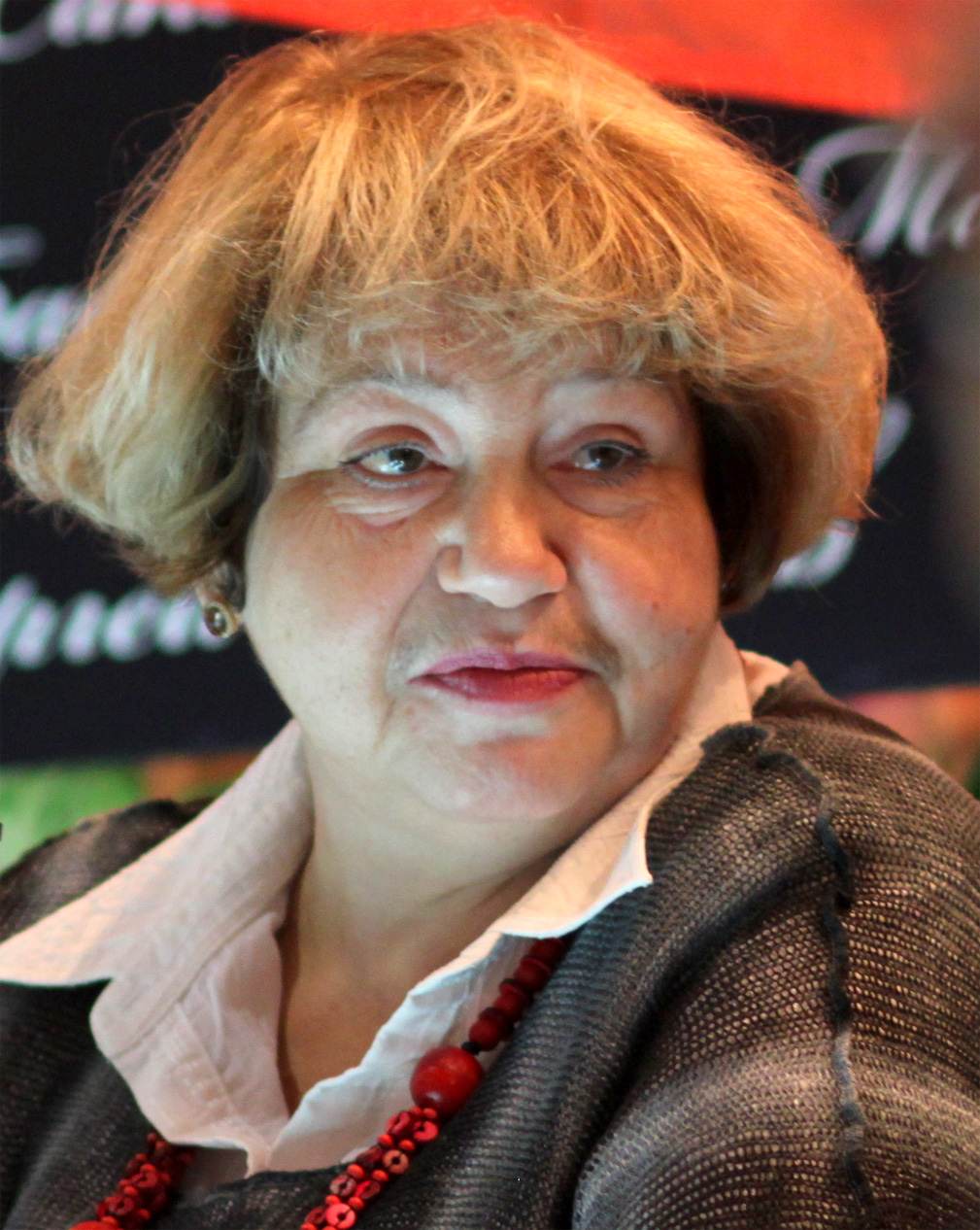
- Vilmont in 2010
- Born: 24 April 1946; Moscow, Russia
- Died: 16 May 2021 (aged 75)
- Occupation: writer

Ekaterina Vilmont (Екатерина Николаевна Вильмонт; 24 April 1946 – 16 May 2021) was a Russian writer.

She was included multiple times in the annual lists of the most published authors of fiction in Russia compiled by the Russian Book Chamber. Several million copies of books by Vilmont have been sold.
