= Viliam Turčány =

Slovak poet, translator, writer and literary scholar (1928–2021)

Viliam Turčány (24 February 1928 – 9 May 2021) was a Slovak poet, translator, writer and literary scholar.

== Biography ==
Turčány was born from a peasant family in 1928, in the village of Suchá nad Parnou. He went to folk school in his native village, graduating in 1947 from the grammar school in Trnava. He subsequently studied Slovak and French at the Faculty of Arts of Comenius University in Bratislava. After graduating, he joined the Institute of the History of Slovak Literature of the Slovak Academy of Sciences in 1952, where in addition to basic military service from 1952 to 1954 he worked as a researcher until 1970. In 1970, he went to the University of Naples for two years to teach Slovak literature. After returning from Italy, he again became a researcher at the Institute of Literary Studies of the Slovak Academy of Sciences, where he worked until his retirement in 1988.

In his work, Turčány focused on three types of works - poetry, monographs, literary-historical studies, and translations. He started publishing poetry during his university studies, especially in the magazines Borba, Plameň, Slovenské pohľady and Nová práca. Turčány made his book debut with a collection of poems by Jarka in the Region (1957) on the theme of memories of childhood, youth and his native region, "in the poetry of the 1950s he renewed his sense of the importance of form". Subsequently, he published works In Stream (1965), At the Anchor (1972), a selection of the love lyric Oliva (1974), a poetic travelogue Aj most som ja (1977) and a comprehensive selection of the poet's work Songs (1978). The final work of his poetic work is the collection of Venus of Slovak prehistory (1979) with fourteen sonnets, inspired by archaeological finds of prehistoric culture in the Slovak territory.
