= Mark Levitan =

American academic (1948–2021)

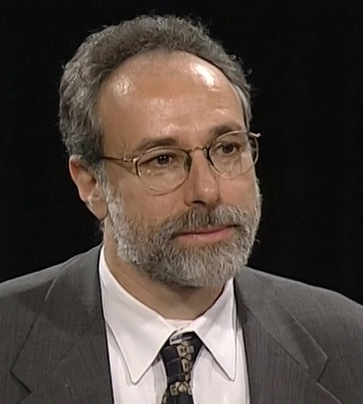
Levitan on CUNY TV's Urban Agenda, 1999

Mark Levitan (May 12, 1948 - May 21, 2021) was an American academic. He received a PhD from the New School for Social Research in 1994 with a thesis "Stability and change in the inter-industry wage distribution : the case of U.S. manufacturing, 1973 to 1987". He wrote a number of reports for the Community Service Society of New York and the Federal Reserve Bank of New York. Levitan served as the Director of Poverty Research at the New York City Center for Economic Opportunity (CEO) for seven years, leading efforts to create an alternate poverty measure that sought to account for New York City's high cost of living and the effects of anti-poverty programs.

== Publications ==
- Levitan, Mark. Opportunity at Work: The New York City Garment Industry. New York, NY: Community Service Society of New York, 1998. Opportunity at Work: The New York City Garment Industry OCLC 735229349
- Levitan, Mark. New York City's Labor Market, 1994-1997: Profiles and Perspectives. New York, NY: Community Service Society of New York, 1998. ISBN 9780881562538
- Levitan, Mark, and Robin Gluck. Mothers' Work Single Mothers' Employment, Earnings, and Poverty in the Age of Welfare Reform. ERIC Clearinghouse, 2002. OCLC 1062984401
- Levitan, Mark. A Crisis of Black Male Employment: Unemployment and Joblessness in New York City. New York, NY: Community Service Society, 2004. OCLC 54927130
- Community Service Society of New York, and Mark Levitan. Poverty in New York City, 2004: Recovery? New York, NY: Community Service Society, 2005. OCLC 1226723759
- Community Service Society of New York, and Mark Levitan. Out of School, Out of Work...Out of Luck?: New York's Disconnected Youth. 2005. OCLC 1226731371
- Community Service Society of New York, and Mark Levitan. Poverty in New York City, 2005: More Families Working, More Working Families Poor. 2006. OCLC 1226729188
- Levitan, Mark, and Susan S. Wieler. Poverty in New York City, 1966-99: The Influence of Demographic Change, Income Growth, and Income Equality. New York, NY: Federal Reserve Bank of New York, 2008. <>.OCLC 240327130
- Levitan, Mark. Accounting for Housing Needs in a High Rent City: Poverty Research by the New York City Center for Economic Opportunity. [Madison, Wis.]: [University of Wisconsin—Madison], 2010. . OCLC 757368105
- Levitan, Mark, and Daniel Scheer. Estimating the Impact of Food Stamps on the New York City Poverty Rate Using a National Academy of Sciences-Style Poverty Measure. Madison, Wis: Institute for Research on Poverty, University of Wisconsin-Madison, 2011. OCLC 779499389
