= José Agusto Briones =

Ecuadorian politician (1961–2021)

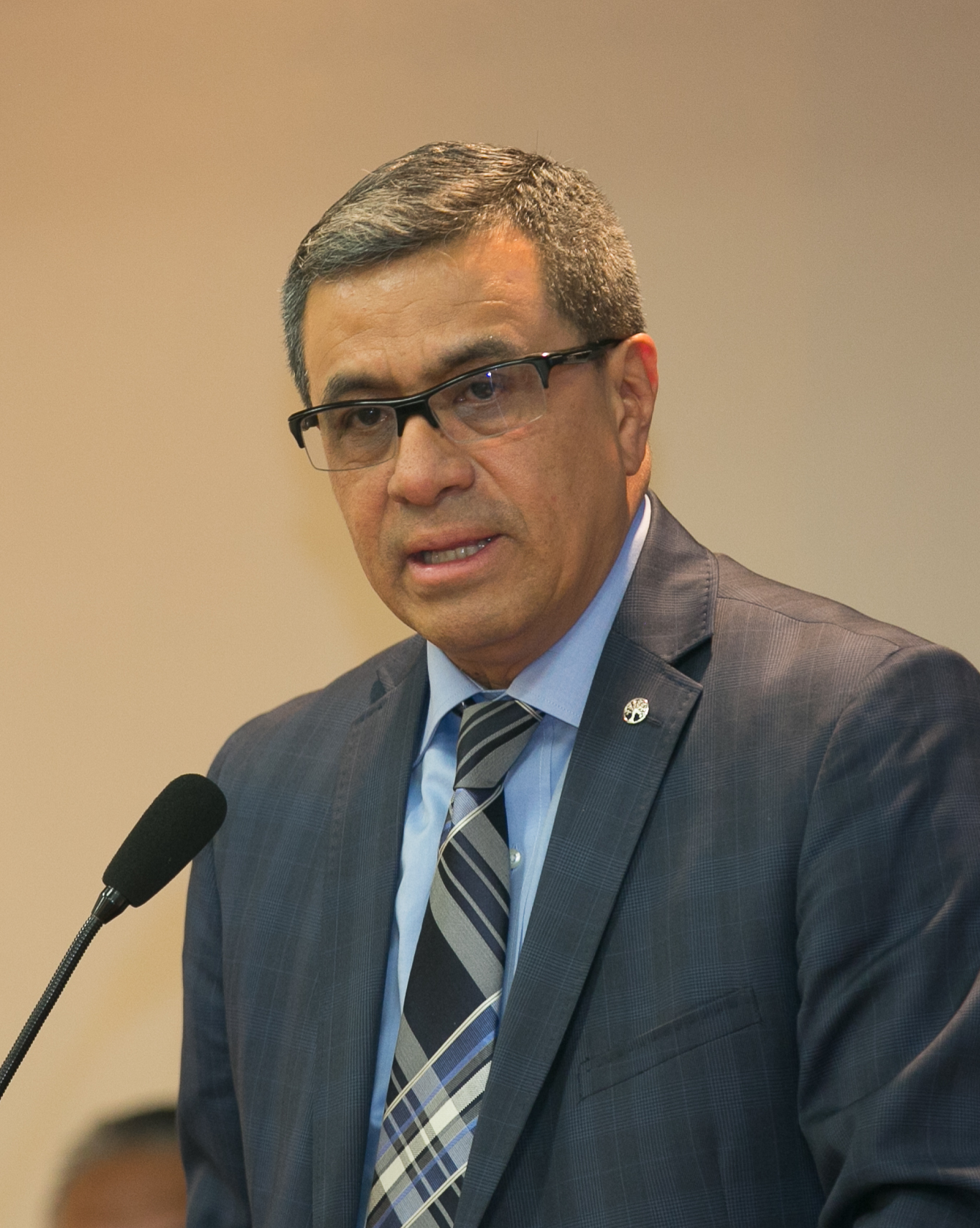
José Iván Agusto Briones at the Press conference on the presentation of the National Voluntary Review by Ecuador

José Iván Agusto Briones (8 May 1961 – 23 May 2021) was an Ecuadorian politician who served as Minister of Energy.
