= Alfredo Zanellato =

Italian painter (1931–2021)

Alfredo Zanellato (8 April 1931 – 5 May 2021) was an Italian painter.

== Biography ==
Zanellato studied drawing at the Art Institute of Adria. He held his first exhibition in 1957 in Mesola. Two years later, he set up a solo show in Ferrara, with his friend and mentor Mimì Quilici Buzzacchi.

In 1962, he obtained a prestigious award for a competition announced by Columbia University. This fact allows the artist to exhibit not only in the most important American cities, but also in Paris, Moscow and Warsaw.

Critics who appreciated his style include the numerous positive interventions written by Raffaele De Grada, Marcello Venturoli and Cesare Zavattini.

His most famous subjects are chairs, objects that refer to the "stuffed and lost time" past.

In 2018, Mesola organized an anthological exhibition at the castle of the same name to celebrate Zanellato's illustrious career. The painter donated a work as a gesture of thanks to the municipality.

Zanellato died on May 5, 2021, at the age of 90.
