= Yosef Kleinman =

Slovak Holocaust survivor (1930–2021)

- Born: Yosef Zalman Kleinman; January 1930; First Czechoslovak Republic
- Died: 4 May 2021 (aged 91); Jerusalem, Israel

Yosef Zalman Kleinman (January 1930 – 4 May 2021) was a Slovak Holocaust survivor the documents marked as killed, who testified against Adolf Eichmann at his trial.

== Early life ==
Yosef Zalman Kleinman was born in Czechoslovakia in January 1930.

Kleinman was deported by the occupying Nazi administration to Auschwitz concentration camp, at the age of 14. His father, mother, and sister were killed at the camp.

== Eichmann trial ==
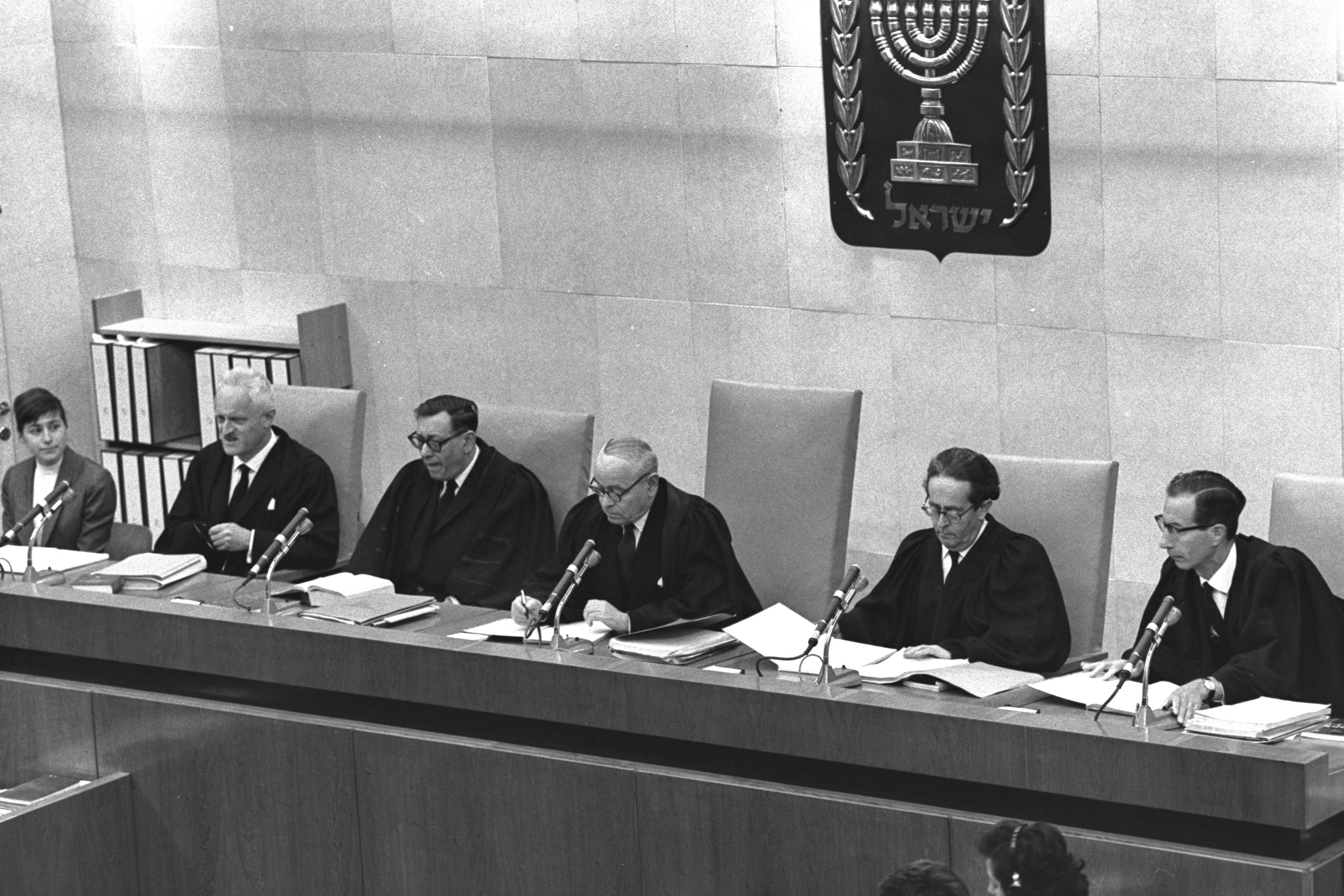
Supreme Court of Israel hearing Eichmann's appeal in March 1962.

Kleinman was one of 110 witnesses at the trial of Adolf Eichmann in 1961.

== Death ==
Yosef Kleinman died in Jerusalem on 4 May 2021 at the age of 91.

== Book ==
- חלצת נפשי ממות (Thou hast delivered my soul from death) (2010)
