= Tatiana Bershadskaya =

Russian musicologist (1921–2021)

Tatiana Sergeevna Bershadskaya (4 July 1921 – 8 May 2021, Russian: Бершадская Татьяна Сергеевна) was a Russian musicologist, music theorist, doctor of arts and professor of the Saint Petersburg State Conservatory. She held the title of Honored Art Worker of Russia.

Bershadskaya was born in Petrograd, USSR. She died on 8 May 2021, at the age of 99.
