= Rudolf Yanson =

Burmese studies scholar (1939–2021)

Rudolf Alexeevich Yanson (Russian: Рудольф Алексеевич Янсон; 6 March 1939 – 16 May 2021) was a professor at St. Petersburg State University, where he was Chairman of the Department of Philology of China, Korea and Southeast Asia in the Faculty of Oriental Studies. He previously served as dean of the faculty of Oriental Studies. Yanson was on the board of the Moscow State Institute of Asian Studies. His research focused on the historical phonology of Burmese. In 2004 Yanson gave a welcoming address to a conference on Indonesian studies. Yanson served on the international advisory board of the SOAS Bulletin of Burma Research. He was scheduled to give the keynote address at the Fifth Medieval Tibeto-Burman Languages Symposium (1 September 2010, SOAS).

== Publications ==
- Yanson, Rudolf and U. M. Ospipov (1965). Ėto sluchilosʹ v polnolunie: novelly birmanskikh pisateleĭ. Moskva: Nauka.
- Yanson, Rudolf (1972). "K voprosy o proischozhdenii birmanskoj pis'meniosti." IV naucnaj konferentsija po istorii jazykami kul'ture Jugo-Vos-tosnoj Azii
- Yanson, Rudolf (1977). "O rekonstruktsii finalej drevnebirmanskogo yazyka." [On the reconstruction of the finals of Old Burmese.] Vostokovedenie 5: 83-92.
- Yanson, Rudolf (1978). "Socetanija hr i rh v dreviebirmanskom jazyka." Vostokovedenie 6: 59-65.
- Yanson, Rudolf (1980). "O kriterijax opredelenija jazykovoj odnorodnosti drevnebirmanskix teskstov." Vostokovedenie 7: 77-85.
- Yanson, Rudolf (1990). Voprosy fonologii drevne-birmanskogo iazyka. [Topics in the phonology of the Old Burmese language.] Moscow: Nauka.
- Yanson, Rudolf (1990). "Proto-tibeto-birmanskie iniciayr ngr i ngy [The Proto-Tibeto-Burman initials ngr and ngj]" Vostokovedenie 16: 96-101.
- Yanson, Rudolf (1994). "Mon and Pali influence on Burmese: How essential was it?" Tradition and Modernity in Myanmar. Münster: LIT.
- Yanson, Rudolf (1997). "O nekotorix sloznix slucayax interpretacii graficeskoy i foneticeskoy farmi' sanskritsko-paliyskix zaimstvovaniy v birmanskom yazi'ke ['On some complicated cases of interpretation of the graphic and phonetic form of Sanskrit Pali loans in Burmese]". Vostokovedenie 19: 58-64.
- Yanson, Rudolf (2002). "A List of Old Burmese Words from 12th Century Inscriptions." Medieval Tibeto-Burman Languages. PIATS 2000: Proceedings of the Ninth Seminar of the International Association for Tibetan Studies ed. Christopher I. Beckwith. Leiden: Brill.
- Yanson, Rudolf (2005). "Tense in Burmese: A diachronic account." Studies in Burmese Linguistics, Justin Watkins, eds. 221-240. Canberra : Pacific Linguistics, Research School of Pacific and Asian Studies, the Australian National University.
- Yanson, Rudolf (2006). "Notes on the evolution of the Burmese Phonological System." Medieval Tibeto-Burman Languages II. Christopher I. Beckwith, ed. Leiden: Brill. 103-120.
