= Fadeli =

Indonesian politician (1955–2021)

Regent of Lamongan
- In office 17 February 2016 – 17 February 2021
- President: Joko Widodo
- Governor: Soekarwo; Khofifah Indar Parawansa
- Deputy: Kartika Hidayati
- Preceded by: Wahid Wahyudi (acting)
- Succeeded by: Yuhronur Efendi
- In office 2010–2015
- President: Susilo Bambang Yudhoyono; Joko Widodo
- Governor: Soekarwo; Khofifah Indar Parawansa
- Deputy: Amar Syaifudin
- Preceded by: Masfuk
- Succeeded by: Yuhronur Efendi

Personal details
- Born: July 16, 1955 Sudangan, Lamongan, East Java, Indonesia
- Died: 8 May 2021 (aged 65) Surabaya, East Java
- Party: Democratic Party

Fadeli (16 July 1955 – 8 May 2021) was an Indonesian politician. He was regent of Lamongan from 2010 to 2015 and from 2016 to 2021.
