= Paul Vollmar =

German priest (1934–2021)

Paul Vollmar (11 November 1934 – 2 May 2021) was a German-born Swiss Roman Catholic auxiliary bishop.

Vollmar was born in Überlingen am Bodensee, Germany and ordained to the priesthood in 1964. He served as titular bishop of Missau and as auxiliary bishop of the Roman Catholic Diocese of Chur, Switzerland, from 1993 to 2009.
