= Marcus McCraven =

American engineer (1923–2021)

Marcus McCraven (December 27, 1923 – May 5, 2021) was an electrical engineer, nuclear scientist, World War II veteran; revolutionary in the creation of nuclear weapons. He was a committee member on various high level projects.

== Life and education ==
Marcus R. McCraven was born on December 27, 1923, in Des Moines, Iowa, to Marcus and Buena McCraven. McCraven graduated from high school, and enrolled at Howard University. During his freshman year of college, McCraven was drafted into the U.S. Army during World War II, serving as a supply clerk in the Army Engineering Regiment in Papua, New Guinea.

== Career ==
After McCraven's Army Engineering Regiment service, McCraven returned to Howard University and became an electrical engineer, working at the U.S. Naval Research Laboratory in Washington D.C. Here McCraven became the project leader of the Nuclear Systems Branch. Later, McCraven moved to work at the University of California. McCraven was the only African American engineer on the team to test and build the hydrogen bomb as part of the Lawrence Livermore National Laboratory. He served as group leader of nuclear systems development with an expertise on diagnostics, being one of five workers to remain near Bikini Atoll during nuclear testing. He also worked with the California Lawrence Radiation Laboratory as part of their research staff.

Around the late 1960s, McCraven moved from California to Connecticut where he began to work at Phelps Dodge. Up until the early 1970s, he joined the United Illuminating Co. being the senior vice president of environmental engineering.

In addition to his work in nuclear development, McCraven served as a trustee at Quinnipiac University, was former Chairman of the Edison Electric Institute Environmental Committee, and also served on the US Environmental Protection Agency National Air Pollution Control Techniques Advisory Committee and the Executive Science Advisory Committee. He received an Honorary Doctorate from Albertus Magnus College in 2011, ten years prior to his death.

McCraven's story as a nuclear scientist working on the Hydrogen bomb was a part of the Emmy-nominated documentary, "No Barriers Too High."

== Personal life and death ==
McCraven married Marguerite McCraven and had three children of their own. McCraven died on May 5, 2021, at the age of 97.
