= Henry Ventura =

Venezuelan politician (1965–2021)

Henry Ventura (Falcón, 23 May 1965 – Caracas, 1 May 2021) was a Venezuelan politician.

== Career ==
Ventura served as the Minister of Health of Venezuela from 2015 till 2016 and later as a member of the National Assembly from 2020 until his death from COVID-19.
