= John W. Jordan =

American politician (1926–2021)

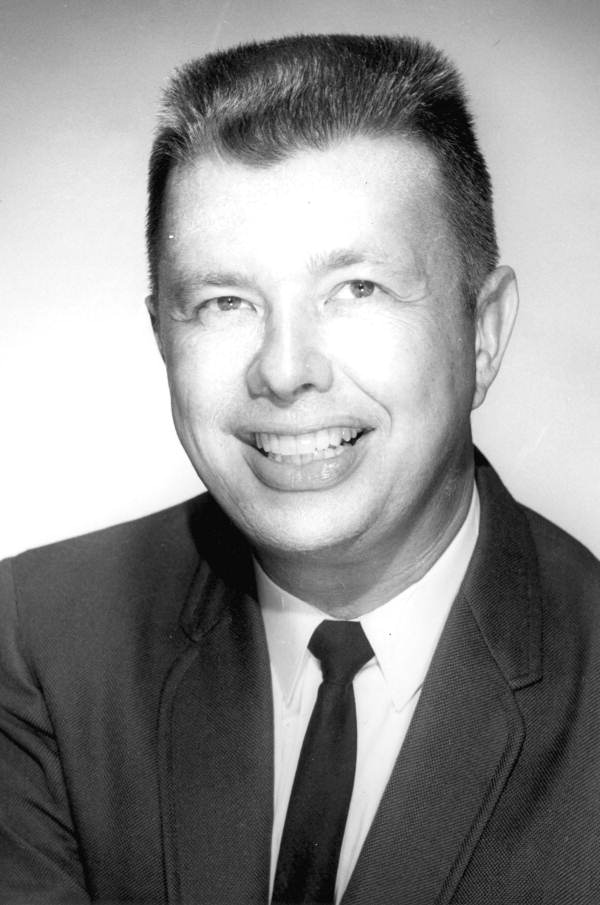

Member of the Florida House of Representatives for the 80th district
- In office 1968–1970

Personal details
- Born: John Weaver Jordan; January 4, 1926 Danville, Indiana, US
- Died: May 18, 2021 (aged 95) Lake Worth, Florida, US
- Party: Republican
- Occupation: insurance executive

John Weaver Jordan (January 4, 1926 – May 18, 2021) was an American and former politician in the state of Florida.

Jordan was born in Danville, Indiana. He is an alumnus of Butler University. He served in the Florida House of Representatives from 1968 to 1970, as a Republican, representing the 80th district.
