= Raymond Biaussat =

French painter (1932–2021)

- Born: January 21, 1932
- Died: May 13, 2021 (aged 89)
- Occupation: Painter

Raymond Biaussat (21 January 1932 – 13 May 2021) was a French painter.

== Awards and honors ==
- Lauréat du Prix de peinture de Baden-Baden, 1954.
- Rose d'or (sous la présidence de Louise de Vilmorin), Doué-la-Fontaine, 1963.
- Bourse des arts et lettres de la Fondation L'Avenir du Périgord, de Sylvain Floirat, 1966.
- Médaille du Professeur Grassé, 1966.
- Premier grand prix avec trophée d'or, Festival international de Cannes, 1974.
- Prix du public, Salon de Colombes, 1978.
- Prix international du Gemmail, Tours, 1982.
- Grand Consul de la Vinée de Bergerac, 1982.
- Membre titulaire de la Société historique et archéologique du Périgord, 1982.
- Diplôme « Ami de lumière », Biennale d'art sacré de Lourdes, 1982.
- Médaille Jean-Cocteau, Milly-la-Forêt, 1984.
- Chevalier de l'Ordre des Arts et des Lettres, 1984.
- Prix du conseil municipal de Périgueux, 1986.
- Médaille d'argent de la ville de Paris, 1992.
- Prix du jury du Salon de la Société nationale des beaux-arts, 2010.
