= Henri Paris =

French general (1935–2021)

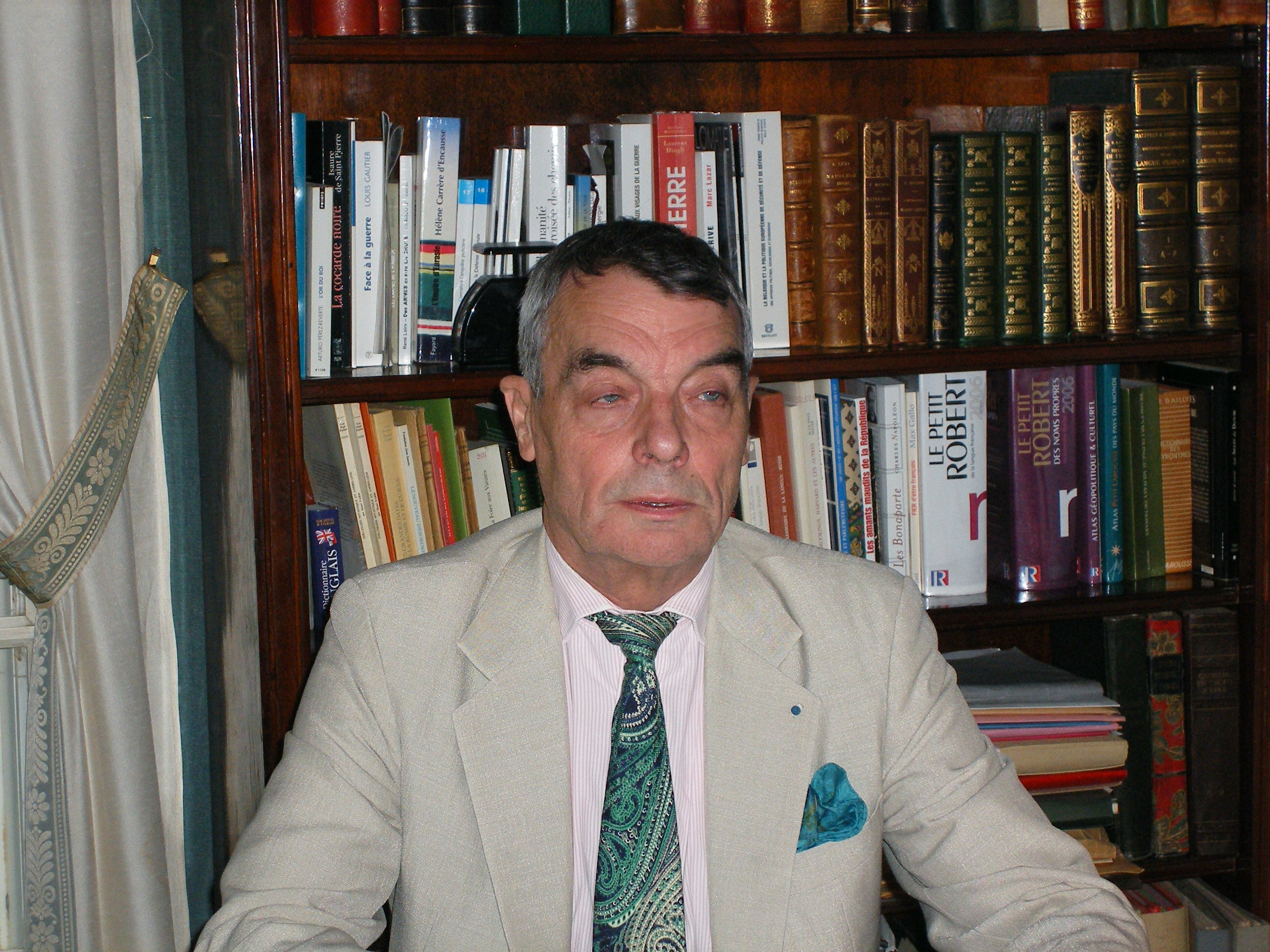
Henri Paris, 2006

Henri Paris (9 August 1935 – 24 May 2021) was a French general.

== Publications ==
- Stratégie militaire soviétique et américaine (Prix Vauban 1981), FEDN Sept Couleurs.
- Les fondements doctrinaux de la stratégie soviétique, en collaboration avec les membres du Groupe d'études et de recherche sur la stratégie soviétique - FEDN, Sept Couleurs.
- Le Niveau de vie en Tchécoslovaquie.
- Le pacte de Varsovie en action. Thèse de Doctorat, mention très honorable avec félicitations du jury.
- Stratégie soviétique et chute du pacte de Varsovie - Publications de la Sorbonne - 1995.
- L'atome rouge - l'Harmattan - 1996.
- L'arbalète, la pierre à fusil et l'atome - Albin Michel - 1997.
- Vers une armée citoyenne - Direction d'un ouvrage collectif - L'Harmattan - 1998.
- Cent complots pour les Cent-jours - L'Harmattan - 2001
- USA : échec et mat - Édition Jacques-Marie Laffont – 2004
- Le pétrole tue l’Afrique – Édition Des Riaux - 2007
- Ces guerres qui viennent - Edition Me Fantascope - 2011
- L'Oncle Sam et le Mandarin - Edition NUVIS - 2013
