= Hermann Schmitz (philosopher) =

German philosopher (1928–2021)

Hermann Schmitz (16 May 1928 – 5 May 2021) was a German philosopher who founded neo-phenomenology. He was a professor at the University of Kiel.
