= Asfaw Yemiru =

Ethiopian educator (died 2021)

Asfaw Yemiru (born 1941–1943 – died 8 May 2021) was an Ethiopian educator who founded the Asra Hawariat School for the poor.

== Biography ==
Yemiru was born from 1941 to 1943 in Bulga, Ethiopia. His father was a Coptic priest. When he was nine years old, he walked to Addis Ababa, a trip of around 75 miles (121 km), with 50 cents. Yemiru worked on the streets, sleeping in St. George's Cathedral for around fourteen months. He eventually found work as a personal servant for a Turkish woman and received an education. Yemiru went to General Wingate boarding school on a scholarship that he won. At the school, he began providing uneaten food to beggars around the building, and at the age of 14, he started teaching them after his classes. In 1960, Yemiru's classes had around 300 students, and the following year Haile Selassie granted him land to build a school—after Yemiru jumped in front of the emperor's limousine to request it. When completed, the building had rudimentary facilities, consisting of ten classrooms.

To raise funds for the Asra Hawariat School for the poor, Yemiru walked between Addis Ababa and Harar, a trek of 620 miles (1,000 km). The school received funding from various sources, including unclaimed lottery winnings, Winchester College, and Haile Selassie. A second campus was constructed beginning in 1972. In 2001, he was awarded the World's Children's Prize for the Rights of the Child. The school had educated over 120,000 children by 2020. It had grown to comprise 64 classrooms, a library, and dormitories.

Yemiru was married to Senayet and had three children.
