= Mels Kenetaev =

Kazakhstani footballer (1945–2021)

Mels Kenetayev
Personal information
- Full name: Mels Oralbekovich Kenetayev
- Date of birth: 6 September 1945
- Place of birth: Akmolinsk, Soviet Union
- Date of death: 22 May 2021 (aged 75)
- Position: Midfielder

Senior career*
Years	Team	Apps	(Gls)
1964–1971	Dinamo Tselinograd		
- * Club domestic league appearances and goals

Mels Oralbekovich Kenetayev (6 September 1945 – 22 May 2021) was a Soviet and Kazakhstani footballer who played as a midfielder, most notably for Dinamo Tselinograd.

Kenetayev died on 22 May 2021, aged 75.
