= R. S. Lugani =

Indian educationist (1927–2021)

Ram Sarup Lugani (known as R.S.Lugani) (25 January 1927 – 22 May 2021) was an educationist who pioneered the Delhi Public School, R. K. Puram.

== Early life ==
Lugani has completed his education from Punjab and Agra University. Lugani has acquired teaching and administration experience from Manchester Grammar School, UK. His father was a Sanskrit teacher.

== Career ==
Lugani was the first headmaster and principal of Delhi Public School, R. K. Puram.

== Award ==
In 1992 he received the prestigious Padma Shri Award for Excellence in Literature & Education.
