= Tatiana Nikonova =

Russian feminist, journalist, and sex educator (1978–2021)

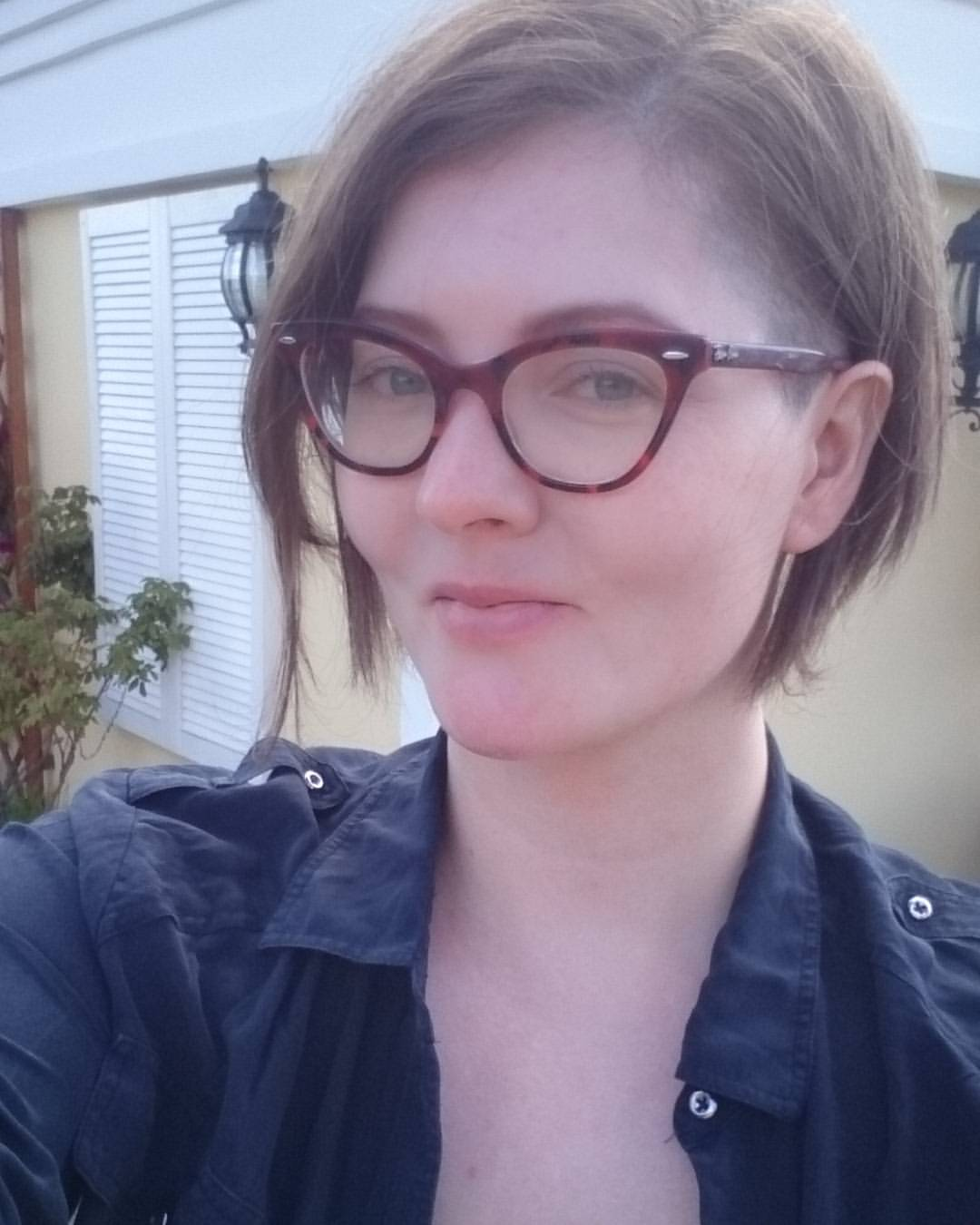
Nikonova on 16 August 2016

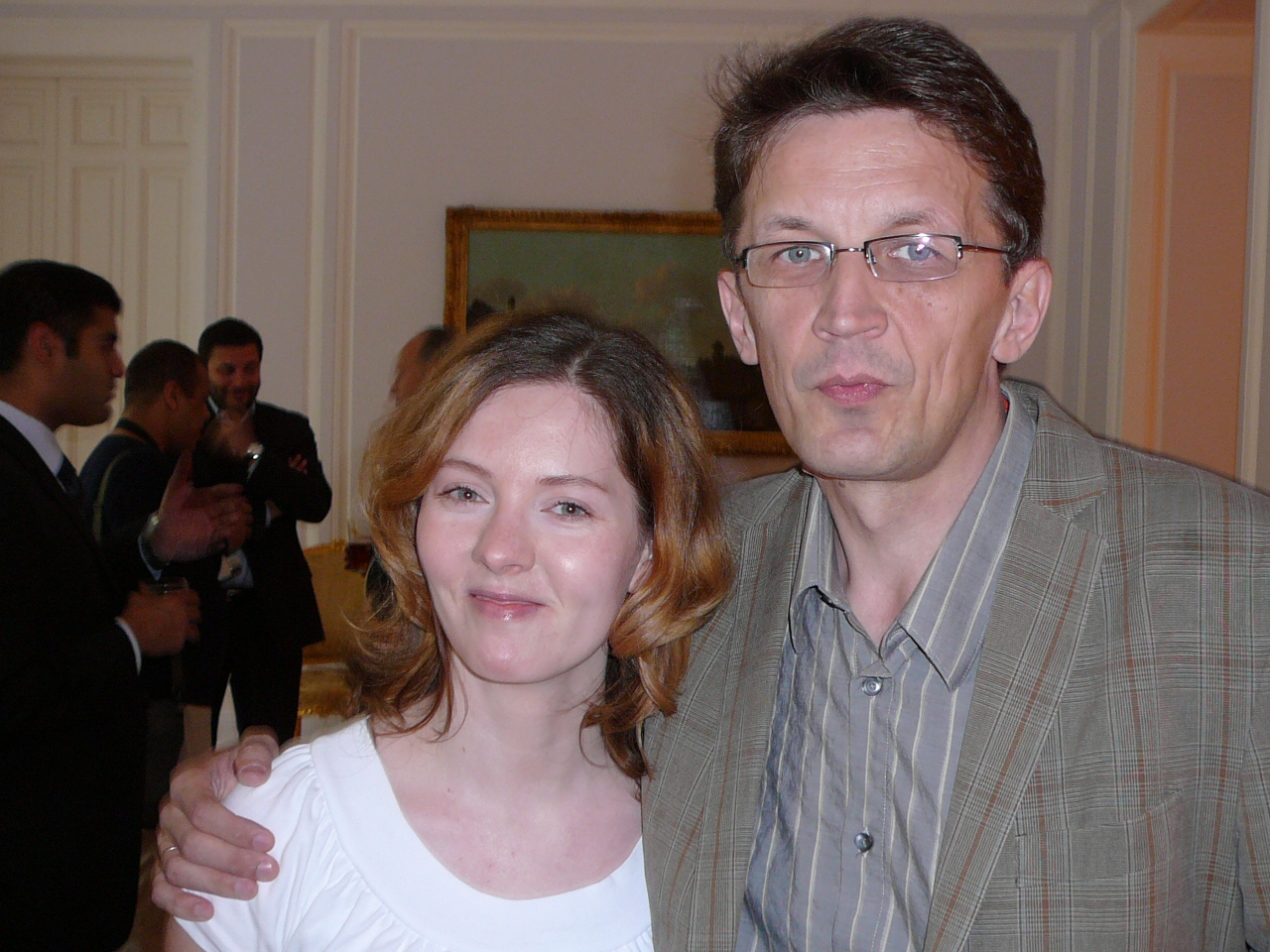
Nikonova in 2007

Tatiana Nikolaevna Nikonova (Russian: Татья́на Никола́евна Ни́конова; 4 February 1978 – 12 May 2021) was a Russian feminist, journalist, blogger, and sex educator. Nikonova was the creator, first owner and editor-in-chief of Spletnik.ru, one of the first sites with news and gossips about celebrities. Tatiana Nikonova was one of the first public sex educators in the Russia. Since 2001, she promoted the need of sex education for teenagers.

Despite Tatiana's diverse activities, she has focused attention on two areas that are interrelated - sexual education and the protection of the rights of women and sexual minorities.

Nikonova in one of the women who advocated the introduction of feminitives in Russian speech on the example of Alexander Pushkin and Leo Tolstoy showed why the language in which they wrote is repulsive without the designation of feminine forms of words.

Nikonova was divorced.
