= Armand Bissen =

Luxembourgish footballer (1931–2021)

Personal information
- Date of birth: 11 January 1931
- Date of death: 26 May 2021 (aged 90)
- Position: Defender

International career
Years	Team	Apps	(Gls)
1952–1955	Luxembourg	5	(0)

Armand Bissen (11 January 1931 – 26 May 2021) was a Luxembourgish footballer. He played in five matches for the Luxembourg national football team from 1952 to 1955. He was also part of Luxembourg's squad for the football tournament at the 1952 Summer Olympics, but he did not play in any matches.
