= Tonnie van As =

Dutch footballer (1928–2021)

Personal information
- Full name: Anton Wilhelm Hendrik van As
- Date of birth: 1 April 1928
- Place of birth: Hillegersberg, Netherlands
- Date of death: 30 May 2021 (aged 93)
- Place of death: Port Coquitlam, Canada
- Position: Left winger

Youth career
- 1939–1941: Ajax
- 1941–1948: Vitesse

Senior career*
Years	Team	Apps	(Gls)
1948–1949	Vitesse	9	(1)
- * Club domestic league appearances and goals

Anton Wilhelm Hendrik "Tonnie" van As (1 April 1928 – 30 May 2021) was a Dutch footballer who played as a left winger.

== Biography ==
Tonnie van As was the son of Cornelis Jacobus van As and Neeltje van Weelderen.

He played for Vitesse during the 1947–48 and 1948–49 seasons. In later years he played for the club's lower division teams, also due to injuries. He emigrated in the 1950s to Canada. He married in Canada and started working as a dentist. He had children and grandchildren.

Van As died on 30 May 2021, aged 93.

== Career statistics ==
Appearances and goals by club, season and competition
Club	Season	League		KNVB Cup		Other (Note: Promotion/relegation play-offs)		Total	
Club	Season	Apps	Goals	Apps	Goals	Apps	Goals	Apps	Goals
Vitesse	1947–48	0	0	—		2	1	2	1
Vitesse	1948–49	9	1	3	3	—		12	4
Total		9	1	3	3	2	1	14	5
