= Ivo Luís Knoll =

Brazilian politician (1929–2021)

Member of the Legislative Assembly of Santa Catarina
- In office 1967–1971

Personal details
- Born: 15 August 1929; Rio do Sul, First Brazilian Republic
- Died: 15 May 2021 (aged 91); Florianópolis, Brazil
- Political party: MDB

Ivo Luís Knoll (15 August 1929 – 15 May 2021) was a Brazilian politician. A member of the Brazilian Democratic Movement, he served in the Legislative Assembly of Santa Catarina from 1967 to 1971.
