= Lynne H. Walling =

American mathematician

Lynne Heather Walling
- Died: May 28, 2021
- Education: Dartmouth College
- Known for: Number theory
- Awards: Fellow of the American Mathematical Society
- Scientific career
- Fields: Mathematics
- Workplaces: University of Bristol
- Thesis: Theta Series Attached to Lattices of Arbitrary Rank (1987)
- Doctoral advisor: Thomas Richard Shemanske
- Website: people.maths.bris.ac.uk/~malhw/

Lynne Heather Walling (October 9, 1958 – May 28, 2021) was an American mathematician specializing in number theory, who became a reader in pure mathematics at the University of Bristol. She was known for her research in number theory. She died on 28 May 2021.

== Early life and education ==
Walling was born on October 9, 1958, and grew up in northern California. She began her undergraduate studies at the University of California, San Diego, and after a two-year gap continued at Sonoma State University, studying accounting at first but then finishing a bachelor's degree in mathematics. She received her Ph.D. from Dartmouth College in 1987 under Thomas Richard Shemanske.

== Career and later life ==
She then taught at St. Olaf College, Minnesota. She lived in an old farmhouse, which had no indoor plumbing. She built a hand-operated pump, enabling her to install a bathtub in the kitchen, beside a wood-burning stove.

She became a tenure-track Assistant Professor at the University of Colorado, Boulder in 1990. In 1995 she received tenure, and in 2000 became a full Professor. She came to Bristol as a reader in mathematics in 2007. From 2011 to 2015 she was Head of Pure Mathematics, and from 2018 was Director of the Institute of Pure Mathematics.

== Awards and honors ==
In 2012, Walling became a fellow of the American Mathematical Society.

== Selected publications ==
- Hafner, James Lee; Walling, Lynne H. Explicit action of Hecke operators on Siegel modular forms. J. Number Theory 93 (2002), no. 1, 34–57.
- Walling, Lynne H. Hecke operators on theta series attached to lattices of arbitrary rank. Acta Arith. 54 (1990), no. 3, 213–240.
- Merrill, Kathy D.; Walling, Lynne H. Sums of squares over function fields. Duke Math. J. 71 (1993), no. 3, 665–684.

== External links and references ==
- Lynne walling's homepage at University of Bristol
- Lyne Walling's research
- Lynne Walling's math genealogy page
