= Steef Weijers =

Dutch politician (1929–2021)

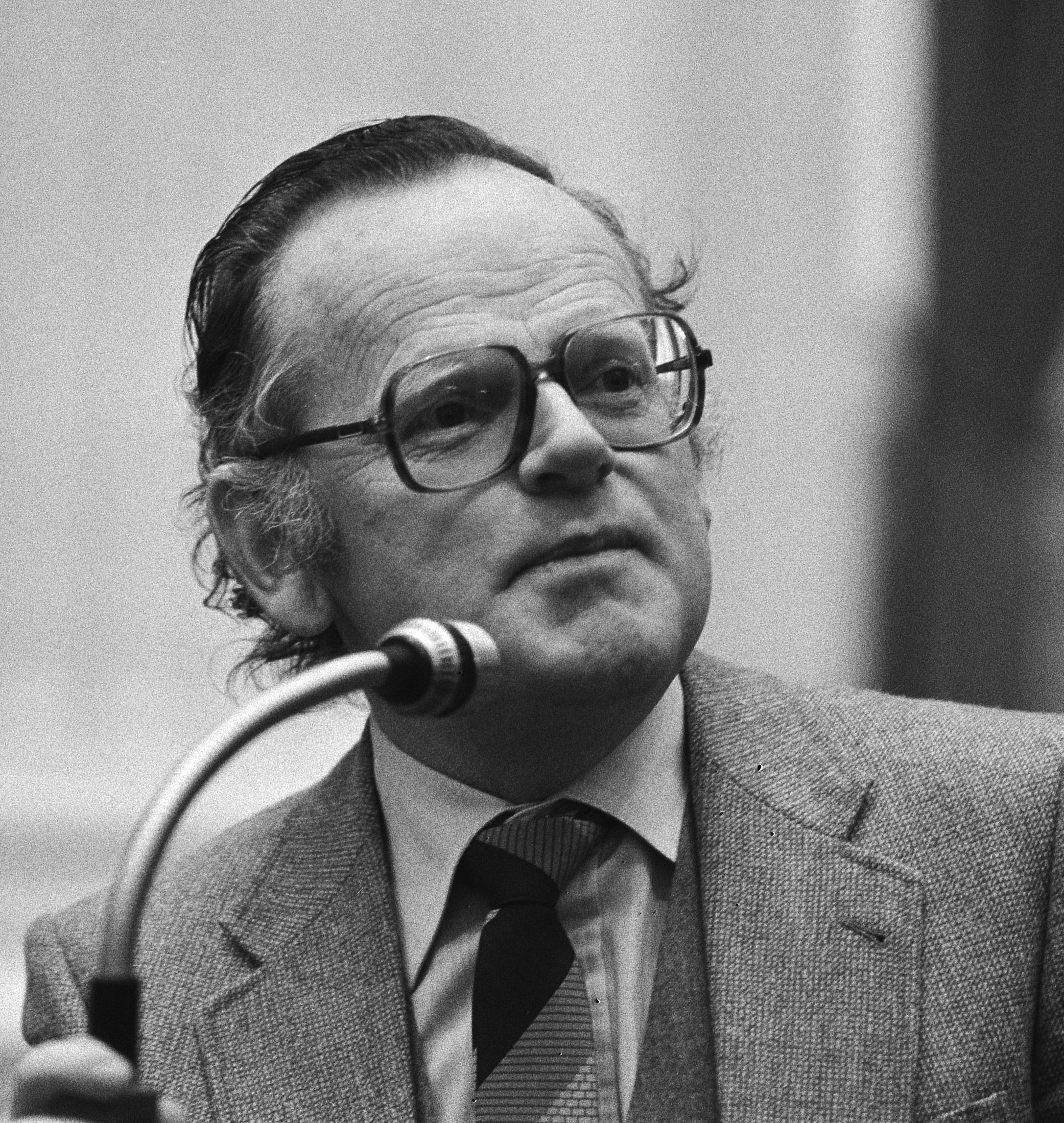
Steef Weijers

Stephanus Cornelis Weijers (13 November 1929 – 27 May 2021) was a Dutch politician who served as a member of the House of Representatives.
