= Gwyneth Paltrow =

American actress and businesswoman (born 1972)

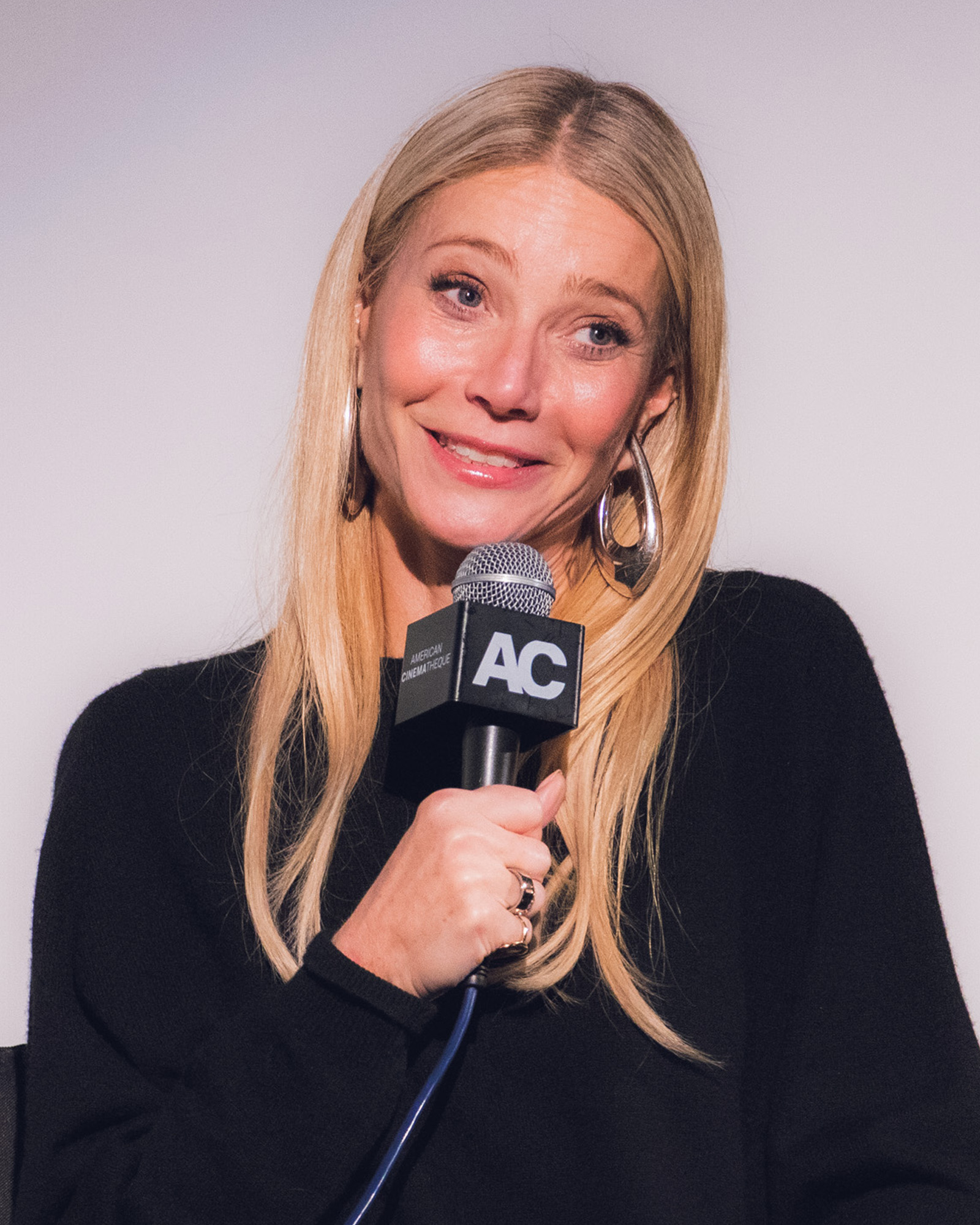
- Paltrow in 2025
- Born: Gwyneth Kate Paltrow; September 27, 1972 (age 54); Los Angeles, California, U.S.
- Other names: Gwyneth Paltrow Martin; Gwyneth Paltrow Falchuk
- Occupations: Actress; businesswoman
- Years active: 1989–present
- Works: Full list
- Political party: Democratic
- Spouses: Chris Martin (m. 2003; div. 2016); Brad Falchuk (m. 2018)
- Children: 2, including Apple Martin
- Parents: Blythe Danner; Bruce Paltrow
- Relatives: Jake Paltrow (brother); Harry Danner (uncle); Rebekah Neumann (cousin); Katherine Moennig (first cousin); Gabby Giffords (second cousin)
- Awards: Full list
- Website: gwynethpaltrow.com

Gwyneth Kate Paltrow (/ˈpæltroʊ/ PAL-troh; born September 27, 1972) is an American actress and businesswoman. The daughter of filmmaker Bruce Paltrow and actress Blythe Danner, she established herself as a leading lady appearing in primarily mid-budget and period films during the 1990s and early 2000s, before transitioning to blockbusters and franchises. Her accolades include an Academy Award, a Golden Globe Award, and a Primetime Emmy Award.

Paltrow gained notice for her early work in films including Seven (1995), Emma (1996), Sliding Doors (1998), and A Perfect Murder (1998). She garnered wider acclaim for her role as Viola de Lesseps in the historical romance Shakespeare in Love (1998), which earned her the Academy Award for Best Actress. This was followed by roles in The Talented Mr. Ripley (1999), The Royal Tenenbaums (2001), and Shallow Hal (2001). She made her West End debut in the David Auburn's play Proof (2003), earning a Laurence Olivier Award for Best Actress nomination, and reprised the role in the 2005 film of the same name.

After becoming a parent in 2004, Paltrow reduced her acting workload by making intermittent appearances in films such as Two Lovers (2008), Country Strong (2010), and Contagion (2011). Paltrow's career revived through her portrayal of Pepper Potts in the Marvel Cinematic Universe, from Iron Man (2008) to Avengers: Doomsday (2026). On television, she had a recurring guest role as Holly Holliday on the Fox musical television series Glee (2010–2011), for which she received the Primetime Emmy Award for Outstanding Guest Actress in a Comedy Series. After starring in the Netflix series The Politician (2019–2020), she took a break from acting, before returning with Marty Supreme (2025).

In 2005, Paltrow became a "face" of Estée Lauder Companies; she was previously the face of the American fashion brand Coach. She is the founder and CEO of the lifestyle company Goop, which has been criticized for promoting pseudoscience. She has written several cookbooks. She also received a Grammy Award nomination for Best Spoken Word Album for Children for narrating the children's book Brown Bear and Friends (2009). She hosted the documentary series The Goop Lab for Netflix in 2020.

== Early life and education ==
Gwyneth Kate Paltrow was born on September 27, 1972 in Los Angeles to actress Blythe Danner and film producer-director Bruce Paltrow. She has a younger brother, Jake, who is a director and screenwriter. Paltrow's father was Jewish, while her mother is Christian. She was raised celebrating "both Jewish and Christian holidays." Her brother had a traditional Bar Mitzvah when he turned 13. Her father's Ashkenazi Jewish family emigrated from Belarus and Poland, while her mother has Pennsylvania Dutch (German) as well as some Irish and English ancestry. Paltrow's paternal great-great-grandfather was a Rabbi in Nowogród, Poland, and a descendant of the well-known Paltrowicz family of rabbis from Kraków.

Paltrow is a half-cousin of actress Katherine Moennig, through her mother, and a second cousin of former U.S. Congresswoman Gabby Giffords (AZ-08) through her father. Paltrow's godfather is director Steven Spielberg. Her uncle is opera singer and actor Harry Danner, whose daughter, actress Hillary Danner, is Paltrow's cousin and close friend. Paltrow recalls their family gatherings: "Hillary and I always had this in common, and to this day ... cooking for people we love, eating, hanging out as a family. It's how we were raised. It's what we do." Another cousin is Rebekah Paltrow Neumann, whose spouse is the Israeli-American billionaire Adam Neumann, founder of WeWork.

Paltrow was raised in Santa Monica, California, where she attended Crossroads School, before enrolling in the Spence School, an all-girls private school in Manhattan. At Crossroads, Paltrow befriended classmate Maya Rudolph, whose father Richard Rudolph was friends with Gwyneth's father Bruce from their time at Tulane University. Later, she studied art history at the University of California, Santa Barbara, before dropping out to act. She is an "adopted daughter" of Talavera de la Reina (Spain), where at 15, she spent a year as an exchange student and learned to speak Spanish. She is also conversant in French, as her family frequently traveled to the South of France throughout her childhood.

== Career ==
=== 1989–1995: Early work ===
Her career beginnings can be credited to her acting family, as her acting debut was in High (1989), a TV film her father directed, and after spending several summers watching her mother perform at the Williamstown Theatre Festival in Massachusetts, Paltrow made her professional stage debut there in 1990. Her film debut followed with the musical romance film Shout (1991), starring John Travolta, and she was cast by her godfather Steven Spielberg in the commercially successful adventure feature Hook (1991) as the young Wendy Darling. Paltrow's next roles were in the made-for-television movies Cruel Doubt (1992) and Deadly Relations (1993).

Her first plum feature film role was in the noir drama Flesh and Bone (1993) as the much younger girlfriend of James Caan. Janet Maslin of The New York Times described Paltrow as a scene-stealer "who is Blythe Danner's daughter and has her mother's way of making a camera fall in love with her."

In 1995, she starred in the thriller Seven, as the wife of a young detective (Brad Pitt), who is partnered with the retiring William Somerset (Morgan Freeman) and then tasked with tracking down a serial killer who uses the seven deadly sins as tropes in his murders. The seventh highest grossing film of the year, Seven earned her a nomination for the Saturn Award for Best Supporting Actress. She appeared in Moonlight and Valentino, as a grieving chain-smoker, and in Jefferson in Paris, portraying Martha Jefferson Randolph.

=== 1996–2001: Breakthrough and film stardom ===
In 1996, Paltrow played the title character in the period film adaptation Emma, based on the 1815 novel of the same name by Jane Austen. Director Douglas McGrath decided to bring in Paltrow to audition for the part of Emma Woodhouse, after a suggestion from his agent and after seeing her performance in Flesh and Bone. On his decision to cast the actress, McGrath revealed: "The thing that actually sold me on her playing a young English girl was that she did a perfect Texas accent. I know that wouldn't recommend her to most people ... I knew she had theater training, so she could carry herself. We had many actresses, big and small, who wanted to play this part. The minute she started the read-through, the very first line, I thought, 'Everything is going to be fine; she's going to be brilliant.'" While she recovered from wisdom-tooth surgery, Paltrow had a month to herself to do research for the part; she studied horsemanship, dancing, singing, archery and the "highly stylized" manners and dialect during a 3-week rehearsal period. The film was released to critical acclaim and commercial success through arthouse cinemas. Variety proclaimed: "Gwyneth Paltrow shines brightly as Jane Austen's most endearing character, the disastrously self-assured matchmaker Emma Woodhouse. A fine cast, speedy pacing, and playful direction make this a solid contender for the Austen sweepstakes." Paltrow starred in the crime film Hard Eight.

1998 marked a turning point in Paltrow's career as she took on leading roles in five high-profile film releases in the year—Great Expectations, Sliding Doors, Hush, A Perfect Murder and Shakespeare in Love. In the adaptation of the Charles Dickens novel Great Expectations, also starring Ethan Hawke, Robert De Niro, Anne Bancroft and Chris Cooper, she played the unrequited and haughty childhood love of a New York City painter. The British drama Sliding Doors saw her star as a woman whose life could take two central paths depending on whether or not she catches a train, causing different outcomes. Great Expectations and Sliding Doors both grossed over $55 million worldwide. Paltrow starred opposite Jessica Lange in the thriller Hush, as an unsuspecting woman living with her psychotic mother-in-law. The film made $13.5 million domestically and was generally panned by critics. In another thriller, A Perfect Murder, inspired by Alfred Hitchcock's 1954 film, Dial M for Murder, Paltrow starred alongside Michael Douglas, playing Emily Taylor, who was based on Grace Kelly's character from the original film. Despite a mixed critical response towards A Perfect Murder, the film grossed $128 million globally. She was also considered for the role of Rose DeWitt Bukater in the 1997 film Titanic.

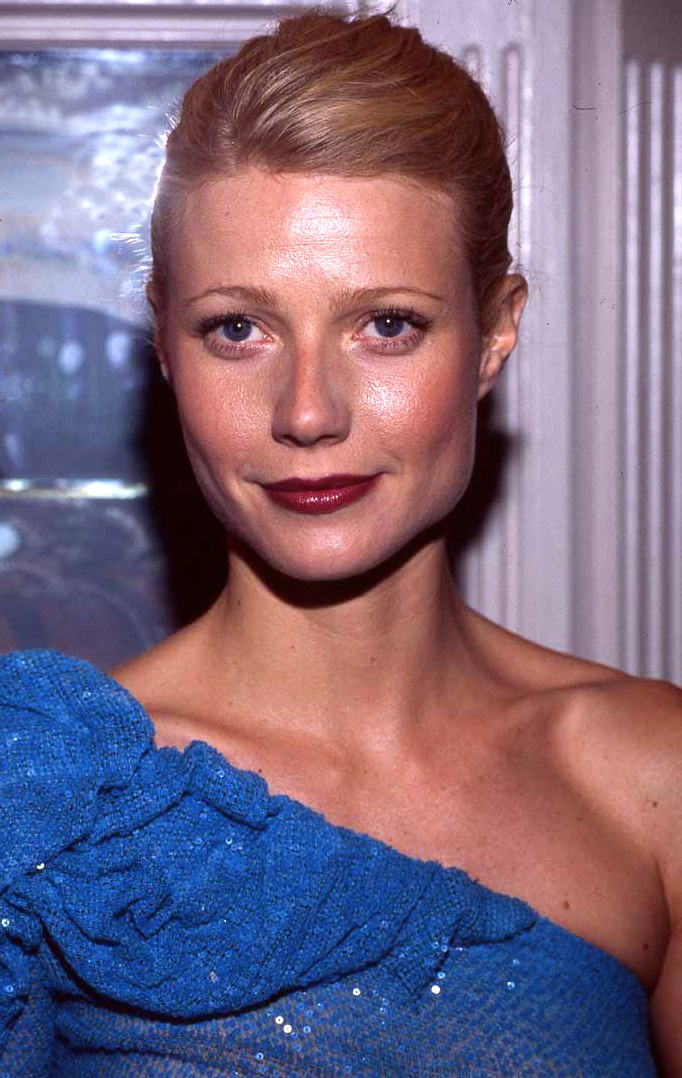
Paltrow at the 2000 Toronto International Film Festival

Her most critically acclaimed role in the year was that of the fictional lover of William Shakespeare in Shakespeare in Love, opposite Joseph Fiennes in the titular part. Entertainment Weekly commented, "Best of all is Gwyneth Paltrow, who, at long last, has a movie to star in that's as radiant as she is." The New York Times summed up her performance as Viola thus: "Gwyneth Paltrow, in her first great, fully realized starring performance, makes a heroine so breathtaking that she seems utterly plausible as the playwright's guiding light." Shakespeare in Love made $289 million in box office receipts, and won Paltrow the Screen Actors Guild Award for Outstanding Performance by a Female Actor in a Leading Role, Golden Globe Award for Best Actress in a Motion Picture – Comedy or Musical, and Academy Award for Best Actress, among other honors. The pink Ralph Lauren dress she wore to the 71st Academy Awards in collecting her Oscar was extremely popular and was credited for bringing pink back into fashion.

In 1999, Paltrow co-starred alongside Jude Law, Matt Damon and Cate Blanchett in the psychological thriller The Talented Mr. Ripley, as the fiancée of a rich and spoiled millionaire playboy (Law) whose identity is adopted by a con artist (Damon). While The Guardian, noting the "very underwritten" female roles in the story, found her to be "peaky and pallid", the film received positive reviews and grossed $80 million in North America. She showcased her singing ability in 2000s Duets, which was directed by her father and co-starred singer Huey Lewis. In the film, about "the little known world of karaoke competitions and the wayward characters who inhabit it", she portrayed the estranged daughter of a hustler (Lewis). She performed a cover version of Smokey Robinson's "Cruisin', which was released as a single and went to number one in Australia, while her rendition of the Kim Carnes classic "Bette Davis Eyes" reached number three. Also in 2000, Paltrow co-starred with Ben Affleck in the moderately successful romantic drama Bounce as Abby Janello.

She starred with Jack Black in the comedy Shallow Hal (2001), about a shallow man falling in love with an overweight woman. Her role required that she wear a specially designed 25-pound fatsuit and heavy makeup. Shallow Hal opened with $22.5 million and grossed $70.7 million in North America and $141.1 million around the globe. Roger Ebert remarked that she was "truly touching" in the film, which he described as "often very funny, but ... also surprisingly moving at times." In the Wes Anderson dramedy The Royal Tenenbaums (2001), co-starring Gene Hackman, Anjelica Huston, Ben Stiller and Luke Wilson, Paltrow took on the role of the adopted daughter in an estranged family of former child prodigies reuniting with their father. A positive critical response greeted the film upon its release, and it made $71.4 million worldwide.

=== 2002–2007: Career fluctuations ===
In 2004, it was noted that since her Oscar win for Shakespeare in Love, Paltrow's film career had been less noteworthy, and critical acclaim had waned. She said she was unequipped for the pressure, leading to several bad film choices, agreeing with peers who believe the win is, in some ways, a curse. During this time, Paltrow rarely appeared in films, having taken a hiatus to raise her two children. In The Guardian, she said she divided her career into movies for love and films for money: The Royal Tenenbaums, Proof, and Sylvia fell into the former category, while she signed on to View from the Top and Shallow Hal for the latter.

In 2002, Paltrow made small appearances in the documentary Searching for Debra Winger and the action satire comedy Austin Powers in Goldmember, while she starred in the thriller-drama Possession with Aaron Eckhart as a couple of literary scholars who unearth the amorous secret of two Victorian poets as they find themselves falling under a deepening connection. The film made a lukewarm $14.8 million worldwide. In the following year, she headlined the romantic comedy View from the Top, where she played the part of a woman from a small town who sets out to fulfill her dream of becoming a flight attendant. Budgeted at $30 million, the film only earned $7 million in its opening weekend; it eventually grossed $15.6 domestically and $19,526,014 worldwide. She later disparaged the film, calling it "terrible". Paltrow starred as the titular role in Sylvia (2003), a British biographical drama directed by Christine Jeffs and co-starring Daniel Craig chronicling the romance between prominent poets Sylvia Plath and Ted Hughes. Distributed for a limited release in most markets, Sylvia made $2.9 million internationally. The New York Times, in its review of the film, wrote that "her performance goes well beyond mimicry. She has a vivid, passionate presence, even when her lively features have gone slack with depression and her bright blue eyes have glazed over."

In 2004, she starred with her The Talented Mr. Ripley co-star Jude Law and Angelina Jolie in the science fiction film Sky Captain and the World of Tomorrow. Her role was Polly Perkins, the reporter for the fictional New York Chronicle. Law became one of the film's producers and used his clout to get Paltrow involved. Once she had been suggested for the role, Law did not remember "any other name coming up. It just seems that she was perfect. She was as enthusiastic about the script and about the visual references that were sort of put to her, and jumped on board." She said in an interview, "I thought that this is the time to do a movie like this where it's kind of breaking into new territory and it's not your basic formulaic action-adventure movie." While critical response was positive, with a budget of $70 million, Sky Captain only grossed $58 million at the international box office. Also in 2004, she was recognized as an outstanding woman in entertainment by Women in Film Los Angeles with the Crystal Award.

In the drama Proof (2005), she starred as the depressed daughter of a brilliant, eccentric mathematician (played by Anthony Hopkins). The film was based on the play of the same name, in which Paltrow also played the same character at London's Donmar Warehouse between May and June 2002. On her portrayal in the film version, Eye for Film remarked: "As she has already shown in Sylvia, The Royal Tenenbaums and even Sliding Doors, Paltrow has an uncanny talent for playing women who are coming apart at the seams and her [character] veers from lovably eccentric to more disturbingly unhinged and back again with fluent ease. The scenes, which she and Hopkins share, as two difficult people bound together by affection, dependency, and mutual respect, are entirely believable and all the more touching for it." For her performance, Paltrow received her second Golden Globe nomination for Best Actress in a Motion Picture – Drama.

Paltrow filmed small roles for the 2006 films Love and Other Disasters, Running with Scissors and Infamous, where she sang Cole Porter's "What Is This Thing Called Love?" Her brother Jake Paltrow directed her in his feature debut, the romantic comedy The Good Night (2007), in which she starred opposite Penélope Cruz, Martin Freeman, Danny DeVito and Simon Pegg as the wife of a former keyboard player (Freeman). The film received a two-theater run in North America and garnered mixed reviews from critics. View London believed the actress was "clearly only playing her part as a courtesy to her director brother and it just makes you wish she'd go back to playing lead roles again."

=== 2008–2013: Marvel Cinematic Universe and revival ===
Paltrow saw a resurgence in her career in 2008 when she was cast in Iron Man as Pepper Potts, Tony Stark's personal assistant, closest friend, and budding love interest. At first hesitant to appear in a big-budget project, Paltrow asked Marvel to send her any comics they would consider relevant to her understanding of the character, whom she considered to be very smart, levelheaded, and grounded. She said she liked "the fact that there's a sexuality that's not blatant". The director Jon Favreau wanted Potts and Stark's relationship to be reminiscent of the 1940s screwball comedy, something which Paltrow considered to be fun in an "innocent yet sexy" way. Iron Man was favorably received by critics, and with a worldwide gross of $585 million, it became Paltrow's highest-grossing film until The Avengers (2012). She reprised her role in the sequels Iron Man 2 (2010) and Iron Man 3 (2013). While the second film grossed $623.9 million internationally, the third entry went on to gross $1.215 billion. She also reprised the role in Spider-Man: Homecoming (2017), Avengers: Infinity War (2018), and Avengers: Endgame (2019).

Paltrow starred opposite Joaquin Phoenix in the romantic drama Two Lovers (2008), playing the beautiful but volatile new neighbor of a depressed bachelor. Two Lovers premiered in competition at the 2008 Cannes Film Festival in May, receiving largely positive reviews, especially for Paltrow's and Phoenix's performances. According to the Los Angeles Times, "Phoenix is at his best with Paltrow's bruised sparrow of a girl; he's desperate to take care of her when he can't even take care of himself. She is one of those actresses who understands the power of a look, and the one of regret and then resignation that overtakes her when Leonard professes his love is steeped in sadness." The film was an arthouse success, grossing $16 million worldwide.

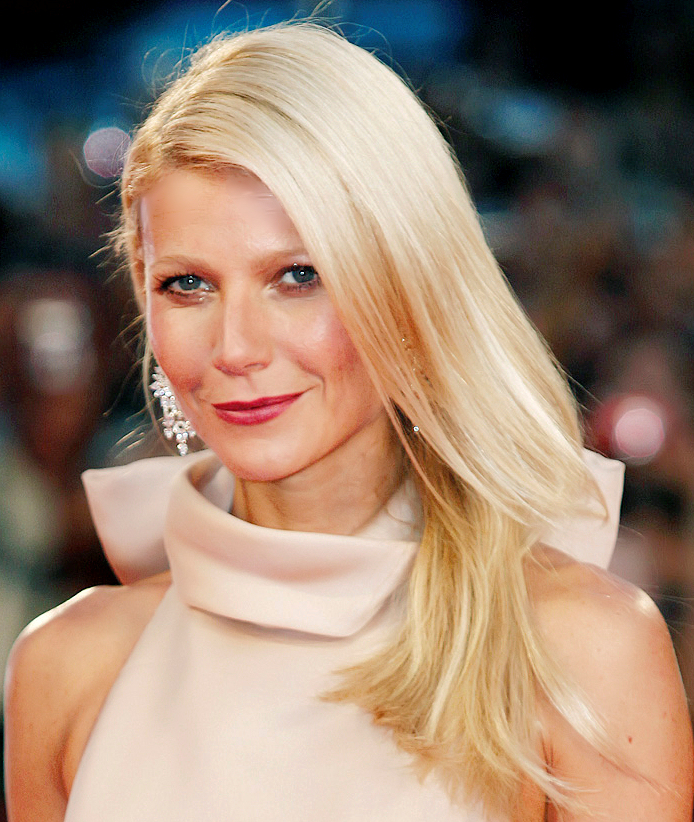
Paltrow in 2011

In the musical drama Country Strong (2010), Paltrow starred as an emotionally unstable country music star who attempts to resurrect her career. She recorded the song "Country Strong" for the film's soundtrack, and it was released to country radio stations in August 2010. The film received mediocre reviews and grossed a modest $20.2 million in North America. The consensus of review-aggregation website Rotten Tomatoes was: "The cast gives it their all, and Paltrow handles her songs with aplomb, but Country Strong's clichéd, disjointed screenplay hits too many bum notes." At the 83rd Academy Awards, Paltrow performed another song from the film, "Coming Home", which was nominated for Best Original Song.

Paltrow made her first scripted television appearance on Fox's Glee, as substitute teacher Holly Holliday, who fills in for Matthew Morrison's character when he falls ill. Her role was developed by co-creator Ryan Murphy, a personal friend of Paltrow's, who suggested that she showcase her vocal and dancing abilities ahead of the release of Country Strong. In her first episode, "The Substitute", she sang "Nowadays" from the musical Chicago with Lea Michele, CeeLo Green's "Forget You", and a mash-up of "Singin' in the Rain" and Rihanna's "Umbrella" with Morrison and the rest of the cast. Her debut on Glee attracted significant buzz and positive commentary from critics; she won a Primetime Emmy Award for Outstanding Guest Actress in a Comedy Series. Indeed, at the time, Entertainment Weekly's Tim Stack and E! Online's Kristin dos Santos called her appearance Emmy-worthy, with the former rating it among her best performances, and the latter stating that Holly received "some of Glee's best-ever one-liners".

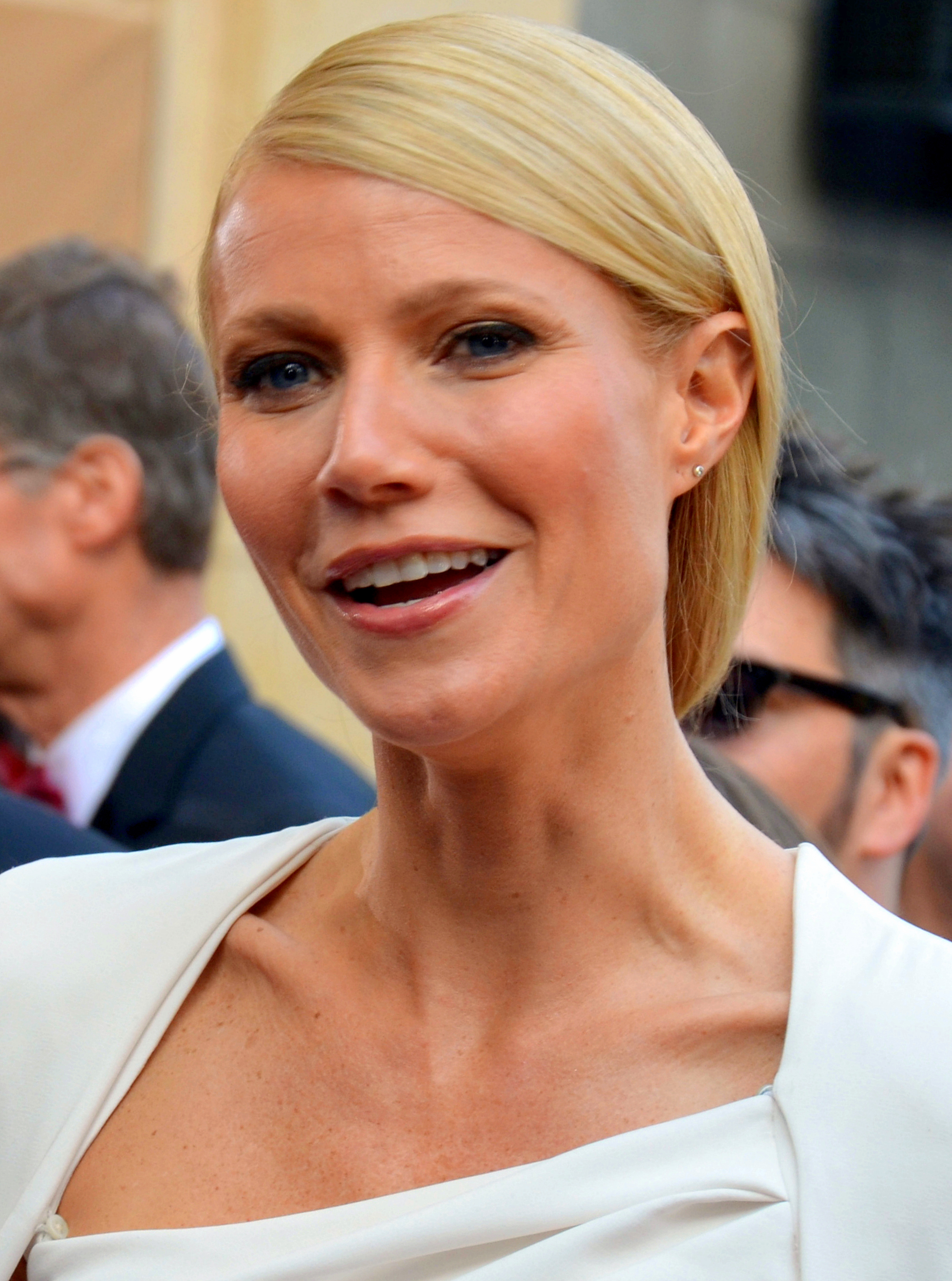
Paltrow at the 84th Academy Awards in 2012

Paltrow later performed "Forget You" with CeeLo Green himself and several puppet characters provided by The Jim Henson Company at the 2011 Grammy Awards. She reprised her role twice more that season, performing "Do You Wanna Touch Me (Oh Yeah)" by Gary Glitter, an acoustic version of "Landslide" by Fleetwood Mac, "Kiss" by Prince, and Adele's "Turning Tables". Paltrow was briefly featured in Glee: The 3D Concert Movie after being filmed while she performed "Forget You" as Holly in the 2011 Glee Live! In Concert! tour performances of June 16 and 17, 2011. Later that year, Paltrow appeared in Steven Soderbergh's film Contagion, featuring an ensemble cast consisting of Marion Cotillard, Kate Winslet and her The Talented Mr. Ripley co-stars Matt Damon and Jude Law. The thriller follows the rapid progress of a lethal indirect contact transmission virus that kills within days. Paltrow played Elizabeth Emhoff, a "working mom" and one of the virus' first victims. Contagion received positive reviews and opened atop at the North American box office with $23.1 million; it went on to gross $75.6 million domestically and $135.4 million worldwide.

Paltrow reprised her role of Pepper Potts in The Avengers (2012), which set numerous box office records, including the biggest opening weekend in North America; it grossed over $1.5 billion worldwide, becoming Paltrow's most widely seen film. Also in 2012, she starred in the independent romantic dramedy Thanks for Sharing, opposite Mark Ruffalo as people learning to face a challenging and confusing road as they struggle together against sex addiction. Distributed for a limited release in certain parts of the United States, the film garnered mixed reviews and grossed $1 million domestically. Paste magazine noted that her role: "...exhibits some of the same obsessive diet and exercise habits that Paltrow herself has been accused of—a kind of meta character trait that balances the power in [the main roles'] budding relationship."

=== 2014–present: Acting sporadically ===
In 2014, Paltrow had a two-episode arc in the improvised online series Web Therapy, as Maya Ganesh, "a new-age caricature". In 2015, she starred in Mortdecai, alongside Johnny Depp, Olivia Munn, and Paul Bettany. In it, she portrayed the wife of an unscrupulous art dealer and swindler (Depp). Budgeted at $60 million, the film only grossed $7.7 million in North America and $47.3 million internationally. Paltrow was featured on the track "Everglow", which was included in Coldplay's seventh studio album A Head Full of Dreams (2015).

In June 2017, Paltrow announced that she would take a break from acting to focus on her business Goop, stating: "I'm still going to do a little bit here and there, but [the company] really requires almost all of my time." In 2019, Paltrow reprised her role as Pepper Potts in Avengers: Endgame. That same year, she played a supporting role in the Netflix comedy drama series The Politician, playing the mother of Ben Platt's character. In October 2021, Netflix released Sex, Love, and Goop, a sex therapy-themed series produced by and starring Paltrow.

In 2023, Paltrow reiterated that her responsibilities with Goop made her less likely to accept acting roles. She returned to acting with Josh Safdie's table tennis drama Marty Supreme, starring Timothée Chalamet. The film was released on December 25, 2025.

== Other ventures ==
=== Philanthropy ===
Paltrow is a Save the Children artist ambassador, raising awareness about World Pneumonia Day. She is on the board of the Robin Hood Foundation, a charitable organization that works to alleviate poverty in New York City.

In April 2020, Paltrow, along with other celebrities, discussed the COVID-19 pandemic with Dr. Anthony Fauci on a one-hour-long zoom call. Fauci hoped the celebrities would use their social media "megaphones" to encourage proper precautions among their followers.

=== Audiobooks ===
In 2009, Paltrow narrated the audiobook The Brown Bear & Friends by Bill Martin Jr., the first of a series of children's audiobooks that she narrated. The Brown Bear & Friends earned Paltrow a Grammy Award nomination for Best Spoken Word Album for Children. Since, she has also narrated Bill Martin's Brown Bear, Brown Bear, What Do You See?, Baby Bear, Baby Bear, What Do You See?, Panda Bear, Panda Bear, What Do You See?, and Polar Bear, Polar Bear, What Do You Hear?.

=== Fashion ===
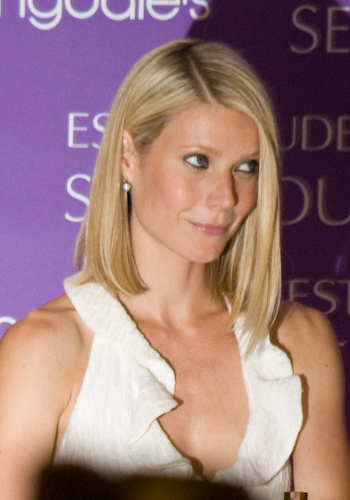
Paltrow at an event for Estée Lauder's fragrance Sensuous, in 2008

In May 2005, Paltrow became the face of Estée Lauder's Pleasures perfume. She appeared in Chicago on August 17, 2007, to sign bottles of the perfume, and on July 8, 2008, she promoted Lauder's Sensuous perfume in New York with the company's three other models. Estée Lauder donates a minimum of $500,000 of sales of items from the 'Pleasures Gwyneth Paltrow' collection to breast cancer research. In 2006, she became the face for Bean Pole International, a Korean fashion brand and in 2014, she partnered with Blo Blow Bar, teaming up with the brand's creative branch.

=== Goop ===
In September 2008, Paltrow launched the weekly lifestyle newsletter Goop, encouraging readers to "nourish the inner aspect". Goop has expanded into a web-based company, Goop.com. According to Paltrow, the company's name came from someone telling her that successful internet companies have double O's in their name, and "is a nickname, like my name is G.P., so that is really where it came from. And I wanted it to be a word that means nothing and could mean anything." Goop has expanded into e-commerce, collaborating with fashion brands, launching pop-up shops, launching a wellness summit, a print magazine, a podcast, and a documentary series streamed on Netflix.

Goop, and by extension Paltrow, have faced backlash for showcasing expensive products and promoting medically and scientifically impossible treatments, many of which have harmful consequences. The controversies have included vaginal steaming, the use of jade eggs, a dangerous coffee enema device, and "Body Vibes", wearable stickers that were claimed to "rebalance the energy frequency in our bodies" and which Goop falsely claimed were made of a NASA-developed material. Goop settled a lawsuit regarding the health claims it made over the jade eggs.

Jill Avery, a brand analyst, has noted how Goop's response to criticism seems designed to "strengthen their brand and draw their customers closer", noting Goop's references to feminism, traditional Asian medicines and Eastern philosophies, and anti-establishment politics to do so. Late Show host Stephen Colbert had repeatedly lampooned Goop products; in 2018 Paltrow appeared in a Late Show sketch seemingly making fun of her company's approach.

On January 24, 2020, Netflix released The Goop Lab, a documentary series. The 6-part show promotes Goop, and covers pseudoscientific topics in energy healing, the use of psychedelic drugs, cold therapy, anti-aging, mediumship, and female sexuality. Critics argued that granting Goop access to Netflix's platform was a "win for pseudoscience". Upon release of the first trailer, and again after the full six-episode series was available, the series sparked controversy concerning the medical and scientific misinformation it presented.

On January 27, 2020, Truth in Advertising watchdog (TINA.org) filed another (Note: It previously filed a similar complaint in 2017) complaint with the district attorneys of California alleging that Goop has continued to engage in deceptive marketing, even after Goop was sued by the State of California earlier that year and agreed to refrain from "making any claims regarding the efficacy or effects of any of its products without possessing competent and reliable scientific evidence that substantiates the claims" for a period of five years. TINA.org's complaint alleges that Goop claims their products are "clinically-proven" to treat such symptoms as anxiety, depression, OCD and more.

In January 2021, it was announced that Paltrow was an early investor in Thirteen Lune, an e-commerce site focused on makeup, skincare, haircare, and wellness products owned by people of color and ally brands. In April 2021, Goop became Thirteen Lune's first ally brand. Paltrow was also an early investor in Saie, a cosmetics brand.

=== Food ===
In October 2007, Paltrow signed with PBS to make a television series, Spain... on the Road Again, which showcased the food and culture of Spain. In 2008, Paltrow co-wrote the book Spain... A Culinary Road Trip with Mario Batali. In 2011, she wrote a book titled My Father's Daughter: Delicious, Easy Recipes Celebrating Family and Togetherness. That same year she penned the book Notes From the Kitchen Table. Two years later she published a book titled It's All Good: Delicious Easy Recipes That Will Make You Look Good and Feel Great, which promoted an elimination diet that is unsupported by medical evidence. Included in that book was a recipe for avocado toast which was widely copied and adapted as part of a 2010s food trend. Also in 2013, Paltrow wrote a foreword for a book by Ross Mathews, Man Up! Tales of My Delusional Self-Confidence. In 2016, Paltrow published a cookbook: It's All Easy: Delicious Weekday Recipes for the Super-Busy Home Cook.

The negative reaction from a group of scientist and science communication mothers to Paltrow's 2015 video pushing for mandatory labeling of food containing genetically modified organisms led to the creation of a documentary, Science Moms. The film is about mothers who advocate for science-based decision-making concerning the health and nutrition of children.

In February 2021 it was reported that Paltrow was suffering from long COVID, leaving her with "some long-tail fatigue and brain fog". She advocated treatments for it which involved a "ketogenic and plant-based" diet (with no sugar or alcohol), fasting until 11:00 every day, and taking infrared saunas. This advice was criticized by NHS England's Professor Stephen Powis.

== Personal life ==
As of 2013, Paltrow practices Transcendental Meditation.

In 2014, Paltrow, whose father was Jewish, was planning to convert to Judaism. In December 2024, she revealed that she celebrates Hanukkah each year with her family.

In 1997, Paltrow said that during the filming of Emma (1996), producer Harvey Weinstein made unwanted sexual advances toward her. She confided in her then-fiancé Brad Pitt, who confronted the producer at an industry event. Weinstein later warned Paltrow not to tell anyone else. In 2017, she was a major source for an article written by The New York Times investigative journalists Jodi Kantor and Megan Twohey about Weinstein's sexual abuse cases.

Paltrow has received backlash from the scientific community and medical professionals for promoting unproven treatments based on pseudoscience through her company Goop.

=== Relationships and marriages ===
Paltrow became engaged in December 1996 to actor Brad Pitt, whom she dated from 1994 to 1997. According to Paltrow, they called off the engagement because she was not ready for marriage. She later said that, as this was her first high-profile relationship with another celebrity, it taught her the need for public discretion about her love life.

Paltrow began dating actor Ben Affleck in October 1997 after meeting at a Miramax dinner, and they worked together on Shakespeare in Love (1998). Although they split in January 1999, months later Paltrow persuaded Affleck to co-star with her in Bounce (2000), and they rekindled their relationship. They ultimately broke up in October 2000. In 2015, Paltrow said she and Affleck remain friends.

In October 2002, Paltrow met Chris Martin of the British band Coldplay backstage three weeks after the death of her father, Bruce Paltrow. The Coldplay song "Fix You", released in September 2005, was written to help Paltrow through her grief. They married on December 5, 2003, at the Santa Barbara County Courthouse. She was pregnant at the time of their wedding. Paltrow and Martin have two children together: a daughter, Apple, and a son. Their son's name was inspired by a song Chris Martin wrote for Paltrow. Simon Pegg and Martin's bandmate Jonny Buckland are her daughter's godfathers.

Paltrow cut down on work after becoming a mother. She also suffered from postpartum depression after the birth of her younger child in 2006. In March 2014, Paltrow announced that she and Martin had separated after ten years of marriage, describing the process as "conscious uncoupling". In her official announcement, Paltrow had her doctor, Habib Sadeghi, and his dentist wife, Sherry Sami, explain conscious uncoupling as "the ability to understand that every irritation and argument [within a marriage] was a signal to look inside ourselves and identify a negative internal object that needed healing," Sadeghi explained. "From this perspective, there are no bad guys, just two people, it's about people as individuals, not just the relationship". In April 2015, Paltrow filed for divorce, which was finalized on July 14, 2016.

In 2014, Paltrow began dating producer Brad Falchuk, whom she met on the set of Glee in 2010. The couple went public with their relationship in April 2015 and announced their engagement on January 8, 2018. Their marriage ceremony was held on September 29, 2018, in the Hamptons on Long Island, New York.

=== Ski crash lawsuit ===
In January 2019, retired optometrist Terry Sanderson sued Paltrow, claiming that three years earlier she collided with him on a ski slope at Deer Valley Resort in Park City, Utah, causing him permanent traumatic brain injury. Paltrow counter-sued Sanderson that February, claiming that he was the one who crashed into her. She sought nominal damages of one dollar and repayment of her legal fees. At trial in March 2023, Sanderson claimed damages for $300,000. The jury found that Sanderson was at fault, not Paltrow, and awarded Paltrow $1 in damages.

The lawsuit was depicted in two separate musicals, I Wish You Well: The Gwyneth Paltrow Ski-Trial Musical and Gwyneth Goes Skiing by Linus Karp.

== Public image ==
As an actress, Paltrow performed in mainly low-budget films for much of her early career, starring in few blockbusters until the mid-2000s. According to Charles Taylor of Salon, many of these performances were characterized by a "blasé" demeanor that made her endearing yet overall demonstrated "a promising actress who needed some training to refine her potential". Similarly, Jose Solis of PopMatters said, "When she's good, she's absolutely brilliant, when she's bad, she just seems deeply uninterested". Many of her characters were wealthy, privileged, and academic, and she was often labeled "Hollywood royalty" in the press. Many viewers mistakenly assumed she was British because of her frequent roles as ingénues in period films, and some publications have described her feigned British accent as one of the best among non-British actors. She was frequently compared to actress Grace Kelly, with whom she shared "blondness, refinement, glacial good looks and all-round star quality", according to The Independent.

Film critic Owen Gleiberman described Paltrow as one of the industry's finest actresses in 2011. He was perplexed by readers' negative comments towards her on his reviews of her work, but agreed that her reputation had suffered from a selection of weaker roles and reduced workload. Critic Wesley Morris defended her acting, calling Paltrow among the final generation of movie stars "for whom stardom and skill seem scarily, thrillingly natural" and "for a while, the best young American actor in Hollywood". Paltrow herself has stated that her passion for acting waned early in her career due to the scrutiny she received as a young actress, with Morris theorizing that she pivoted away from acting towards an industry she could exercise complete autonomy over. In 2019, she claimed to have been only "masquerading as an actor" before founding Goop. Christina Newland of BBC said Paltrow used her roles throughout the 1990s to cultivate "an image off and on-screen ... as a chic social butterfly with charm to spare". She also established herself as a fashion icon, becoming recognized for her minimal style of dressing for public events. In April 2013, Paltrow was named People magazine's annual "Most Beautiful Woman".

"There is something so absurd about Paltrow's image that it seems almost to transcend the disdain you might expect to be levelled at her for such flagrant unworldliness. To many, she's such a caricature of privilege, doing things that are so glossily removed from ordinary life, that she seems to have become a source of amused, even affectionate fascination".

— Christina Newland, BBC

Paltrow has been described as a polarizing and divisive public figure by the media for much her career. Although generally revered as an actress, her subsequent career endeavors as a businesswoman have garnered mixed reviews. Taylor wrote in 2004 that "No star of the last 10 years has been such a magnet for the neuroses and prejudices of those who watch her than Paltrow", which the author surmised as due to her being "rich, white, beautiful and successful". In 2023, Leanne Delap, a writer for Everything Zoomer, called her "one of the most divisive personages of our time", equally beloved and hated. Many of her remarks regarding diet, health, wellness, and wealth have drawn public backlash and mockery, which some critics have used to justify dismissing her as a privileged and "out of touch" celebrity.

Paltrow has attributed the public's discourse surrounding her to the perception that her success hinges exclusively on the achievements and wealth of her parents, which she has attempted to dispel in interviews. The actress also maintains that the public's shift in favor against her can be traced back to the moment she delivered an emotional acceptance speech when she won her Oscar for Shakespeare in Love in 1998. Journalist Hadley Freeman believes Paltrow is completely in control of how she is perceived, describing her as a performer who has ingeniously cultivated an overexposed image that allows her career to benefit from being a parody of the modern-day celebrity.

According to entertainment journalist Dylan Howard, "Inevitably, in a saga of Hollywood, people identify with either the sympathetic character or the villain ... When it comes to Gwyneth Paltrow, she's both the villain and sympathetic figure". Describing her as "successful, opinionated and seemingly happy" in 2013, journalist Tanya Gold attributed her unpopularity – particularly among women – to her "venturing beyond the accepted Hollywood script and expressing her thoughts about clothing, motherhood and nutrition". Some journalists theorized that Paltrow's brand and reputation benefited from the sympathy she gained during the ski crash trials, as reported by Edward Helmore of The Guardian. The Independent said "The very trial that threatened to harm her reputation — one that has not been exempt from its fair amount of controversies over questionable advice ... ultimately invigorated the Hollywood actor's image in the court of public opinion". However, Alex Abad-Santos of Vox argued that, rather than seek sympathy or relatability, Paltrow embraced the stereotypes her detractors had long accused her of perpetuating, ultimately to her own benefit. Paltrow's penchant for wearing understated luxury-brand clothing during the trial also received widespread coverage, inspiring a trend known as "courtcore", as coined by The New York Times fashion journalist Vanessa Friedman.

In a 2021 article for Vogue, Keaton Bell defined her as "one of our last, true A-listers" whose "every move consumes daily headlines", observing that she "is now better known as a fabulously out-of-touch entrepreneur than an actor, and she seems perfectly fine with that". In 2023, EJ Dickson of Rolling Stone reported that Paltrow had largely rehabilitated her image by "lean[ing] into her own image as an out-of-touch celebutante", becoming "regularly heralded as a scrappy, savvy, self-made entrepreneur". Newland agreed that "in today's relentlessly critical social media discourse, many find her schtick so over-the-top that they can't help but find it entertaining". According to Charles Trepany of USA Today, Paltrow's "calm, unbothered demeanor" had become virtually synonymous with her brand and public image by 2024.

== Political views and activism ==
According to The Daily Telegraph in 2026, Paltrow "has typically stayed quiet on political matters". That year, she said on the Goop Podcast, "I'm pretty centrist, and my husband thinks I'm a Republican − which, I'm not a Republican. I don't feel anything right now, to be totally honest with you. I feel like I'm completely an independent."

In October 2014, Paltrow held a fundraiser for the Democratic National Committee at her estate in Brentwood, California. She praised President Barack Obama for supporting equal pay for women, which she said was "very important to me as a working mother." She held a fundraiser for Democratic presidential candidate Pete Buttigieg in 2019.

In 2022, Paltrow supported Rick Caruso in that year's Los Angeles mayoral election. In 2023, she praised anti-vaccine activist Robert F. Kennedy Jr., saying, "It was very interesting to hear his point of view. Since then he's said some things that I think are tricky, let's put it that way." In 2025, she said she was "very fascinated" by the Make America Healthy Again (MAHA) movement championed by Kennedy.

=== Israel ===
In 2026, The Times described Paltrow as being "among the most prominent pro-Israel celebrities in Hollywood". She has spoken at events held by Hadassah, a Zionist women's organization.

Following the 2023 October 7 attacks on Israel, Paltrow expressed support for the hostages taken by Hamas, and signed a letter urging then-President Joe Biden to help them. In 2024, she criticized the killing of Shani Louk, and the silence of feminists on alleged rape by Hamas during the October 7 attacks. That year, she also participated in a Hanukkah video campaign alongside Noa Tishby, an Israeli actress and activist.

In June 2026, Paltrow appeared in an advertisement campaign by property developer Aviv Melisron for 51 Park, a luxury housing development in Herzliya, Israel. Her appearance faced online criticism, due to the ongoing Gaza war and genocide.Saint Hoax referred to Paltrow as "Gwynicide Paltrow" to their 3.4 million followers on Instagram, and other personalities such as Matt Bernstein and Livia Giuggioli Firth criticized Paltrow for appearing in the campaign. The advertisement was parodied by Hannah Pilkes.

== Acting credits and accolades ==
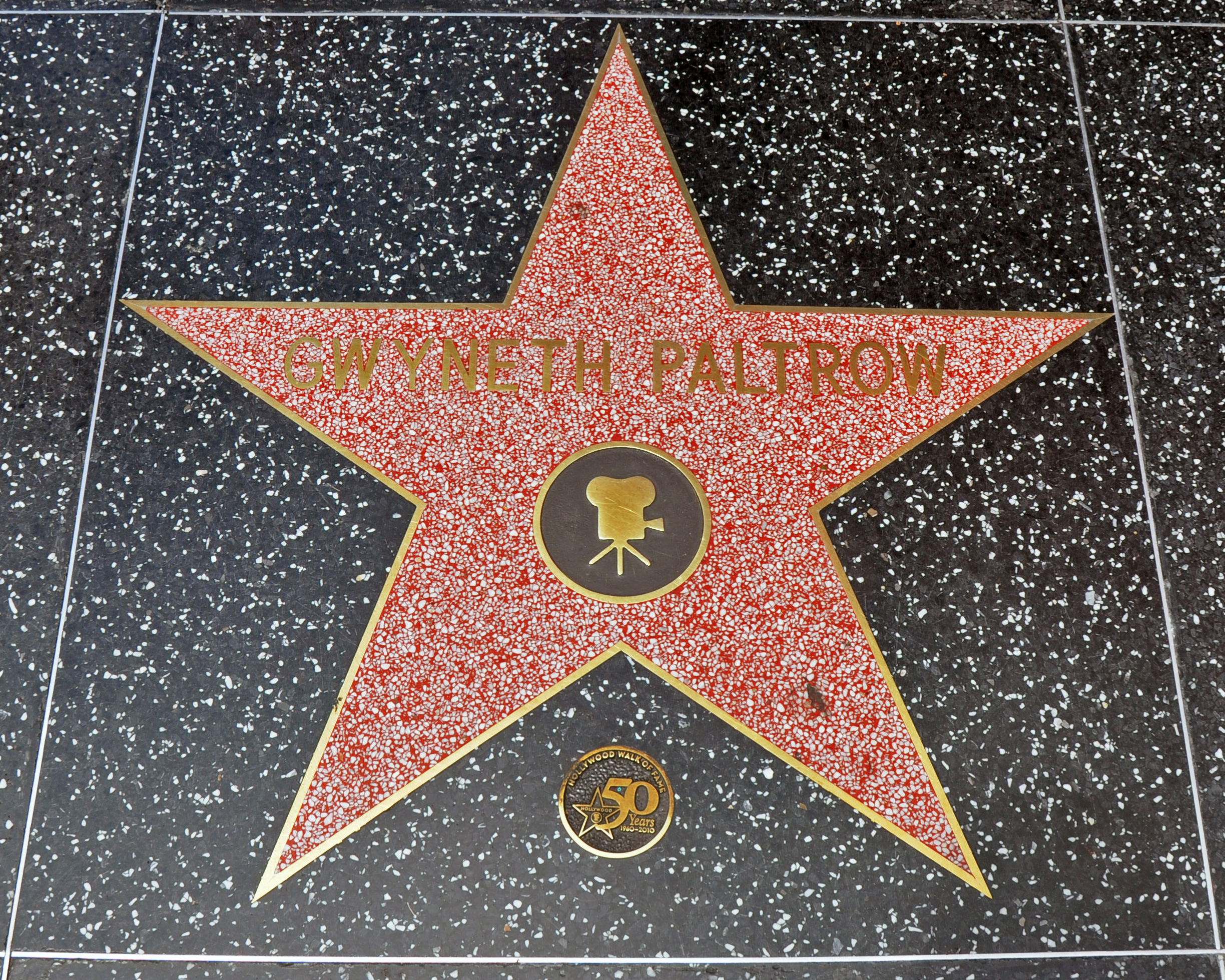
Paltrow's star on the Hollywood Walk of Fame

Paltrow has starred in over 50 films. According to review aggregator website Rotten Tomatoes, Paltrow's most critically acclaimed and commercial successful films include Avengers: Endgame (2019), Iron Man (2008), Shakespeare in Love (1998), Spider-Man: Homecoming (2017), The Avengers (2012), Avengers: Infinity War (2018), Contagion (2011), The Talented Mr. Ripley (1999), Emma (1996), Seven (1995), Hard Eight (1996), Two Lovers (2008), The Royal Tenenbaums (2001), Iron Man 3 (2013), Mrs. Parker and the Vicious Circle (1994), Infamous (2006), Iron Man 2 (2010), Sky Captain and the World of Tomorrow (2004), and Flesh and Bone (1993).

Paltrow has received various awards and nominations, including an Academy Award, a Golden Globe Award, a Primetime Emmy Award, and two Screen Actors Guild Awards. Paltrow received a motion picture star on the Hollywood Walk of Fame at 6900 Hollywood Boulevard in Hollywood.

== Bibliography ==
- Paltrow, Gwyneth (2011). My Father's Daughter: Delicious, Easy Recipes Celebrating Family & Togetherness. New York: Goop Press, Grand Central Life & Style. ISBN 978-0-446-55731-3.
- Paltrow, Gwyneth (2011). Notes from My Kitchen Table. New York: Goop Press, Grand Central Life & Style. ISBN 978-0-7522-2789-4.
- Paltrow, Gwyneth (2013). It's All Good: Delicious, Easy Recipes That Will Make You Look Good and Feel Great. Grand Central Life & Style. ISBN 978-1-4555-2271-2.
- Paltrow, Gwyneth (2019). The Clean Plate: Eat, Reset, Heal. Photographs: Ditte Isager. New York: Goop Press, Grand Central Life & Style. ISBN 9781538730461. OCLC 1089896843.
- Sadeghi, Habib (2017). The Clarity Cleanse: 12 Steps to Finding Renewed Energy, Spiritual Fulfillment and Emotional Healing. Foreword: Gwyneth Paltrow. New York: Goop Press, Grand Central Life & Style. ISBN 978-1455542246. OCLC 982093512.

== See also ==
- List of celebrities who own cannabis businesses
