= Chicka Chicka 1, 2, 3 =

Picture book by Bill Martin, Jr. and Michael Sampson

- Front cover illustration showing an apple tree
- Author: Bill Martin Jr. & Michael Sampson
- Illustrator: Lois Ehlert
- Cover artist: Lois Ehlert
- Language: English
- Series: The Chicka Learning Series
- Subject: Numbers
- Genre: Children's book
- Publisher: Simon and Schuster Books for Young Readers
- Publication date: July 2, 2004
- Publication place: United States
- Media type: Hardback
- Pages: 40
- ISBN: 0-689-85881-7
- OCLC: 53900934
- Dewey Decimal: [E] 22
- LC Class: PZ8.3.M3988 Cf 2004
- Preceded by: Chicka Chicka Boom Boom
- Followed by: N/A

Chicka Chicka 1, 2, 3 is the title of a children's picture book written by Bill Martin, Jr. and Michael Sampson, and illustrated by Lois Ehlert in 2004. It was published by Simon & Schuster. It is a sequel to Chicka Chicka Boom Boom from 1989.

== Plot ==
Anthropomorphic numbers from 1 to 20 consecutively (including 5 wearing a top hat), then 30 to 90 by tens (including a long, sandy haired number 70), and finally 99, climb up an apple tree. While watching them climb, the number 0 tries to find a place available for him in the tree.

However, 0 soon realizes there is no more room left for him, until a few angry bumblebees make everyone in the tree (except 10 who hides) fall out, counting backwards. While this happens, a few of the numbers are revealed to have suffered certain injuries from the fall.

The number 0 finally finds his place in the tree and goes to the top, joining with 10 and forming the large number 100. After all the bumblebees are scared away, all the other numbers return and climb back up the apple tree, cheering for 10's and 0's bravery.

== Development ==
The publisher, Simon & Schuster, originally asked Bill Martin, Jr. to write a sequel to his book Chicka Chicka Boom Boom. But when he and co-author Michael Sampson turned the manuscript in, it was rejected. That manuscript was published by Henry Holt as the title Rock It, Sock It, Number Line. Five years later, Martin and Sampson wrote a second counting book, and it became Chicka Chicka 1, 2, 3.

== Reception ==
The book quickly became a best-seller, and is used by teachers throughout the United States to teach counting and place value to young children.

== Awards ==
The book has won numerous awards from a variety of publications, libraries, and parenting groups, including Best Book of 2004 by Parenting Magazine.

== Adaptations ==
At the same year when the book was published, Weston Woods Studios made an animated musical short film adaptation of the story. As with the original Chicka Chicka Boom Boom cartoon, its music was composed and performed by Crystal Taliefero.
