= David Plummer =

David Plummer may refer to:

- David Plummer (musician), English musician and author of children's books and music
- David Plummer (swimmer) (born 1985), American backstroke swimmer
- Dave Plummer (born 1968), American/Canadian entrepreneur and programmer
- David Plummer (photographer) British wildlife photographer
