= Lois Ehlert =

American author and illustrator (1934–2021)

- Born: Lois Jane Ehlert; November 9, 1934; Beaver Dam, Wisconsin, U.S.
- Died: May 25, 2021 (aged 86); Milwaukee, Wisconsin, U.S.
- Occupations: American illustrator and children's writer
- Writing career
- Years active: 1987–2017

Lois Jane Ehlert (November 9, 1934 – May 25, 2021) was an American author and illustrator of children's books, most having to do with nature. Ehlert won the Caldecott Honor for Color Zoo in 1990. Some of her other popular works included Chicka Chicka Boom Boom, Cuckoo/Cucú: A Mexican Folktale/Un cuento folklórico Mexicano and Leaf Man. She lived in Milwaukee, Wisconsin, at the time of her death in 2021.

== Early life ==
Ehlert was born Lois Jane Ehlert on November 9, 1934, in Beaver Dam, Wisconsin, to Gladys (née Grace) and Harry Ehlert. She was the eldest of three children. Her mother was a seamstress who taught her how to sew at eight years old. Her mother also shared fabric scraps with her, which gave her an exposure to art early on. Her father was a trucker and blue-collar worker who also worked as a gas-station attendant, dairy worker and a maintenance man.

Ehlert grew up painting and sculpting. Her father had a basement workshop and always had art supplies available, just not the traditional supplies, but materials such as scrap lumber and nails. Even in her early years, she always erased her drawings and was never satisfied. Her favorite art technique was and remained till her death to be cutting and pasting. This method is called collage—the process of cutting out pieces of paper, fabric, or objects and gluing them to a backing.

She graduated from the University of Wisconsin–Madison with a degree in English and psychology. She then went to the Layton School of Art in Milwaukee, Wisconsin, on a scholarship for a certificate in advertising design.

== Career ==
Ehlert started her career as a freelance illustrator and a graphic designer. She also worked as an apprentice in an art studio, while working the evenings on her own art work. Amongst her first credited books as an illustrator was I Like Orange (1961) by Patricia Martin Zens, the author of The Gingerbread Man. Her first book as an author and illustrator was Growing Vegetable Soup (1987). The book was a garden-to-table guide for small children exposing the lifecycle of activities from planting seeds to steaming the vegetables in the kitchen.

Ehlert had her own book creation approach. She began with a "dummy book" made from pencil drawings. Then, she assessed to determine the subject matter of the new book. Once she had a topic, she did background research to learn more. Then she began her artwork, which involves cutting out each piece individually and then gluing them on the pages of her book.

Her work reflected her love of nature with gardens and nature playing a central theme in many of her works. Her 1989 book Chicka Chicka Boom Boom, was a best seller and sold over 12 million copies worldwide. The book, which had text by Bill Martin Jr. and John Archambault, had a colorful alphabet climbing a coconut tree. The book was read by the then US president Barack Obama to young visitors during the 2013 White House Easter Egg Roll.

Writing about her, the Publishers Weekly, called attention to her "signature collage artwork featuring bold colors and crisply cut shapes as well as found objects." Through her career she wrote and illustrated 38 books for young readers.

Ehlert won the Caldecott Honor Book in 1990 for Color Zoo and won a Publishers Weekly Best Book of the Year for Snowballs. Ehlert became the Booklist Editors' Choice for Cuckoo/Cucú: A Mexican Folktale/Un cuento folklórico Mexicano. She also was awarded the IRA Teachers' Choice and NCTE Notable Children's Trade Book in the Language Arts for Feathers for Lunch and received the American Library Association Notable Children's Book and Boston Globe – Horn Book Award for Chicka Chicka Boom Boom. She received an Honorable Mention from the National Outdoor Book Award (Children's Category) in 2005 for Leaf Man, which was also awarded the Boston Globe-Horn Book Award in 2006.

== Personal life and death ==
Ehlert married designer and artist John J. Reiss in 1967. The couple divorced in the 1970s. She died on May 25, 2021, at her home in Milwaukee at age 86.

== Selected works ==
- Growing Vegetable Soup (1987)
- Planting a Rainbow (1988)
- Chicka Chicka Boom Boom (illustrator) (1989)
- Color Zoo (1989)
- Eating the Alphabet (1989)
- Thump, Thump, Rat-a-Tat-Tat (illustrator) (1989)
- Color Farm (1990)
- Fish Eyes (1990)
- Red Leaf, Yellow Leaf (1991)
- Feathers for Lunch (1990)
- Circus (1992)
- Moon Rope/Un Lazo a La Luna (1992)
- Nuts to You! (1993)
- Mole's Hill: A Woodland Tale (1994)
- Snowballs (1995)
- A Pair of Socks (illustrator) (1996)
- Under My Nose (1996)
- Cuckoo/Cucú: A Mexican Folktale (1997)
- Angel Hide and Seek (illustrator) (1998)
- Top Cat (1998)
- Waiting for Wings (2001)
- Market Day/Día de marcado (2002)
- In My World (2002)
- Crocodile Smile (illustrator) (2003)
- Moon Rope (2003)
- Hands: Growing Up to Be An Artist (2004)
- Pie in the Sky (2004)
- Leaf Man (2005)
- In My World (2006)
- Wag a Tail (2007)
- Oodles of Animals (2008)
- Boo to You! (2009)
- Lots of Spots (2010)
- Rrralph (2011)
- The Scraps Book (2014)
- Holey Moley (2015)
- Rain Fish (2016)
- Heart to Heart (2017)
