= Chicka Chicka Boom Boom =

1989 picture book by Bill Martin, Jr. and John Archambault

- Cover for the original book.
- Author: Bill Martin Jr. and John Archambault
- Illustrator: Lois Ehlert
- Language: English
- Series: Chicka Chicka Books
- Genre: Children's picture book
- Publisher: Simon & Schuster
- Publication date: September 14, 1989
- Publication place: United States
- Pages: 36
- ISBN: 1-55924-577-8
- OCLC: 19262991
- Followed by: Chicka Chicka 1, 2, 3

Chicka Chicka Boom Boom is an American children's picture book written by Bill Martin, Jr. and John Archambault, illustrated by Lois Ehlert, and published by Simon & Schuster in 1989. The book teaches the English alphabet through rhyming couplets, and charted The New York Times Best Seller list for children's books in 2000.

== Plot ==
An anthropomorphic lowercase alphabet climbs up a coconut tree in order, but their increasing weight makes the tree lean over and everyone falls out. Shortly after, their uppercase parental figures rush to aid the lowercase letters and rescue them from the pile.

As the tree gradually returns to its upright position and the letters leave the pile, again alphabetically, some of them are revealed to have suffered certain injuries from the fall. Later during the night, the letter "a" returns and climbs back up the coconut tree, proposing a double dare on the rest of the alphabet to catch him.

== Sequels, spin-offs and related media ==
An abridged version of the book entitled Chicka Chicka ABC was published in 1990, which contains the first half of the original story up to the point where the alphabet falls out of the coconut tree. A follow-up book teaching numbers, entitled Chicka Chicka 1, 2, 3, was published on July 2, 2004, with Michael Sampson as author in addition to Martin and Ehlert.

Several audiobook versions are available, one of which was narrated by Ray Charles. Additionally, a CD-ROM game based on the book was released in 1995 by Davidson and Simon & Schuster Interactive.

Weston Woods Studios made an animated musical short film adaptation of the book in 1999, with music composed and performed by Crystal Taliefero.

A 2005 episode of the Nick Jr. series Blue's Room entitled "The Power of the Alphabet" featured the letters from the book (in uppercase and in puppet form) as guest characters. The book Chicka Chicka ABC is also read towards the end of the episode.

Beginning in 2024, a new line of books was published as companion pieces to the original book. Following the retirement of Lois Ehlert in 2017 and her death in 2021, all of these books were illustrated by Julien Chung. Notable installments include Chicka Chicka Ho Ho Ho, a Christmas-themed retelling of the story written by William Boniface in which the letters are decorations on a Christmas tree (published on October 1, 2024); parent-themed books Chicka Chicka I Love Mom and Chicka Chicka I Love Dad (both published on March 11, 2025); and Chicka Chicka Tricka Treat, a Halloween-themed retelling in which the letters dress in costumes (published on July 15, 2025).

== Album ==
Chicka Chicka Boom Boom and Other Coconutty Songs

Studio album by John Archambault and David Plummer
- Released: 2000
- Recorded: 1991–1992
- Genre: Children's music
- Label: Youngheart Records
- Producers: David Plummer & John Archambault

In 1992, Archambault released an album composed of several songs based on the storybook entitled Chicka Chicka Boom Boom and Other Coconutty Songs, along with musician David Plummer. It was named a 1992 "Notable Children's Recording American Library Association and in 1993, won a Parents' Choice Award. Its main track was the title song Chicka Chicka Boom Boom, which was the book's title.

=== Track list ===
No.	Title	Length
1.	"Chicka Chicka Boom Boom"	2:25
2.	"ABC Song"	0:54
3.	"Braggin' Dragon"	2:20
4.	"Helicopter Man"	2:23
5.	"Merry-Go-Round"	2:36
6.	"Didgereedoo"	3:08
7.	"Counting Sheep"	2:25
8.	"B-A-Bay"	1:51
9.	"5 Little Monkeys"	0:19
10.	"Here Comes Another One"	3:00
11.	"Saturday Night At The Fair"	2:01
12.	"Jump Rope Rhymes"	2:00
13.	"Chicka Chicka Funk"	3:36
