= Pleasance Islington =

Theatre in north London, England

Coordinates: 51.5487°N 0.1217°W

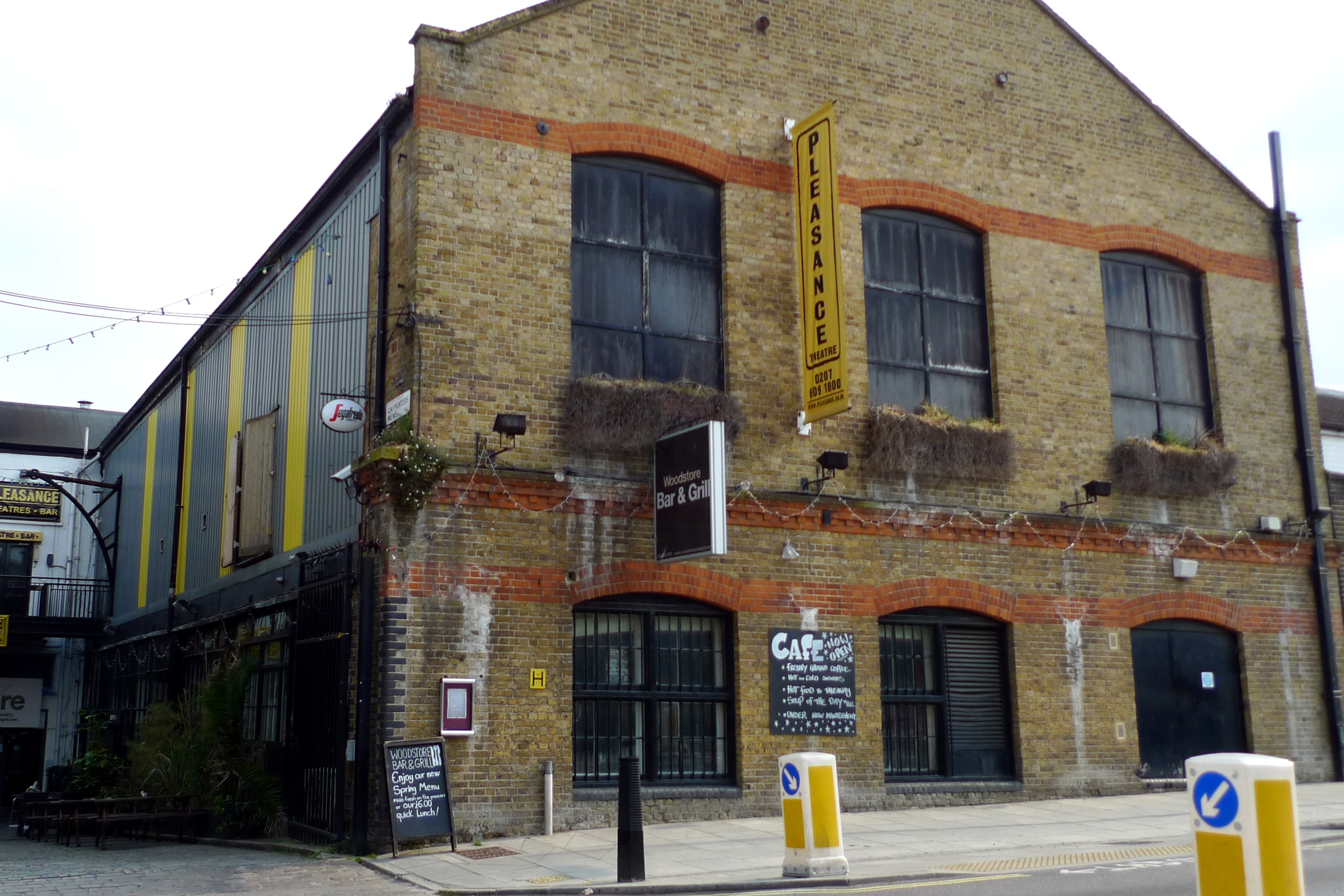
Pleasance Theatre

Pleasance Islington (also known as Pleasance London or the Pleasance Theatre) is a fringe theatre in Islington, London, opened in 1995. It is run by the Pleasance Theatre Trust and is the sister venue of the original Pleasance Edinburgh.

It has hosted popular comedians including Michael McIntyre, Micky Flanagan, Mark Watson, Adam Hills and Mark Thomas. Ginger Johnson, the winner of the fifth series of RuPaul's Drag Race UK, was an Associate Artist of Pleasance Islington.

Linus Karp and Joseph Martin of Awkward Productions, the theatre company behind Gwyneth Goes Skiing, are Associate Artists of Pleasance Islington in the 2023–2025 season.
