= Gwyneth Goes Skiing =

Musical by Leland, Linus Karp, Joseph Martin

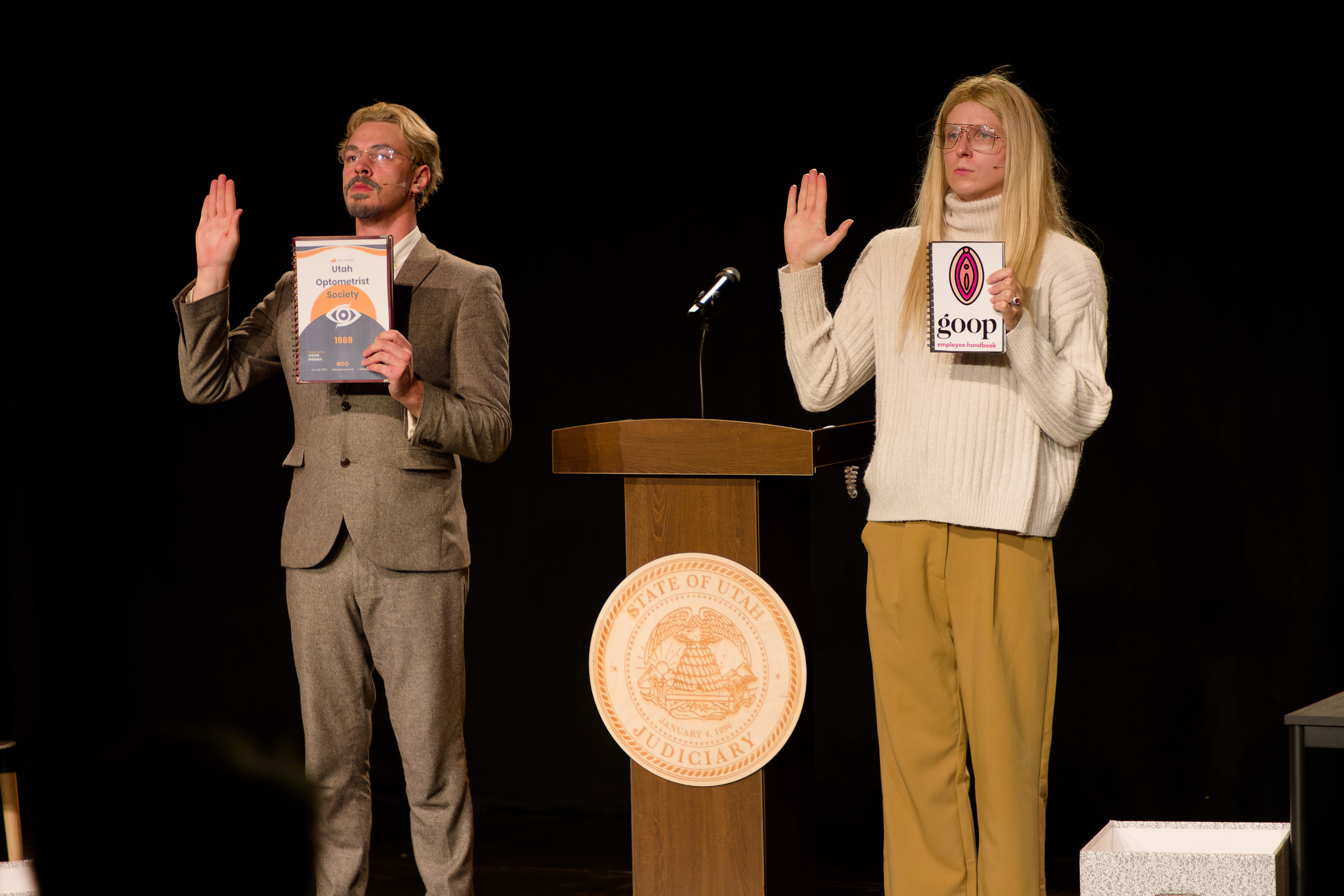
Karp and Martin perform the show at the 2024 Edinburgh Festival Fringe.

Gwyneth Goes Skiing is a musical with a book and lyrics by Linus Karp and Joseph Martin and music by Leland. The story centers on the 2023 US court case between actress Gwyneth Paltrow and optometrist Terry Sanderson over a ski collision at Deer Valley ski resort in Utah.

The play premiered off West End in London's Pleasance Theatre in December 2023, before a second run at the same theatre in February 2024, followed by a 2024 UK tour. It played at the Edinburgh Fringe in 2024 and at the SoHo Playhouse in New York City in January and again in October to November 2025. In all of the productions of the show to date, Gwyneth and Terry have been played by the writers, Linus Karp and Joseph Martin. The pre-recorded singing voices of Gwyneth and Terry have been provided by Catherine Cohen and Darren Criss, respectively. Trixie Mattel also appears in a video cameo as Paltrow's mother, Blythe Danner. It is set to be revived in January 2026 in Aspen, Colorado, at the Wheeler Opera House from January 14 to 16, in Los Angeles, California, at The Elysian Theater from January 21 to 24.

Reviewing the play, Brian Logan, writing in The Guardian, rated the "camp" comedy three out of five stars: "The show is packed with jokes, if often the obvious ones ... and cheerfully unabashed by its basement-level production values. It co-opts the crowd to play supporting roles [and] shares with its audience a gossipy delight in the trial's more outre episodes. ... I’m not sure those limited pleasures sustain for the two-hour duration." A reviewer in La Voce di New York gave the show 3-1/2 out of five stars, commented that the "script serves up a constant stream of ... pop cultural touchstones ... all delivered with a deft touch. ... [I]n our celebrity-obsessed culture, no one is more into Gwyneth Paltrow than she herself. The staging is short on budget and long on creativity."
