= Planting a Rainbow =

1988 picture book by Lois Ehlert

- Cover of the book
- Author: Lois Ehlert
- Illustrator: Lois Ehlert
- Language: English
- Genre: Children's picture book
- Publisher: Harcourt
- Publication date: 1988
- Publication place: United States
- Pages: 32
- ISBN: 9780152626099
- OCLC: 1003840363
- Preceded by: Growing Vegetable Soup
- Followed by: Color Zoo

Planting a Rainbow is an American children's picture book about gardening written and illustrated by Lois Ehlert, published in 1988 by Harcourt. It was named an Outstanding Science Trade Book for Children by the National Science Teachers Association in 1989. It was translated to Spanish in 2006 as Cómo plantar un arco iris.

== Content ==
The book's short story (six illustrated-pages long) revolves around planting and cultivating of a flower garden by a mother and her child.

== Reception ==
A reviewer for the Kirkus Reviews positively compared the book to Ehlert's earlier similar book, Growing Vegetable Soup, noting that the color selection has improved from somewhat chaotic and "almost painfully bright" to a "splendidly gaudy array"; describing the book as "bold" and "stylish". Nonetheless the reviewer criticized the book for being too abstract and failing to capture the flow of time properly.

On the other hand, a reviewer for the Publishers Weekly considered the book inferior to its predecessor, noting that "this new title lacks the fresh approach to the natural cycle of planting, growth and reaping" seen in Growing Vegetable Soup. The reviewer noted that both books share a similar theme (gardening). In summary, the reviewer praised the book writing that it is "welcome for its bursts of color and well-documented labeling of flowers" but stressing that the predecessor was more "comprehensive", and the sequel adds little new value to it.

Tina L. Burke who reviewed the book for Childhood Education positively reviewed the book, commenting on "deft use of colors and composition", attention-drawing "color grouping of flowers", as well as educational identification of seeds, bulbs, sprouts and blossoms.

Lillian Heil writing for the Children's Book and Media Review highlighted Ehlert's "ability to distill the essence of each flower in a simplified shape" visible in this work. Heil noted that this is common in Ehlert's works, as "her large, simplified shapes and electric colors" make it easy to recognize her books.

Eugene Geist in Young Children described a teaching activity for learning math aimed at young children, inspired by this book.

Isabel Schon who reviewed the Spanish version for YC Young Children noted that the theme of the book follows an earlier work by Ehlert, Growing Vegetable Soup. She positively commented on the book, noting its "bold, colorful graphics" and calling it "handsome", although she noted a translation problem with the Spanish version (lack of Spanish determiners).
