= 51 Park =

Residential development in Herzliya, Israel

- Location: Herzliya, Israel
- Status: Under construction

Companies
- Architect: Avner Yashar
- Developer: Aviv Melisron

51 Park is a luxury residential development in Herzliya, Israel. The development consists of two 51-story residential towers next to Herzliya Park and Galil Yam Park, in the Schakim neighbourhood.

The building was designed by Israel architect Avner Yashar and developed by Israeli real estate group Aviv Melisron. Condo units are selling for up to $10 million.

== Promotion ==
In June 2026, American actress Gwyneth Paltrow was featured in an advertisement for the development. The video was shot in New York City, comparing 51 Park to buildings adjacent to Central Park, with Paltrow saying, "There’s a reason the world’s most iconic buildings are by a park. 51 Park." Asked if the building is in New York City, Paltrow replies, "Herzliya. Israel."

The advertisement went viral, and Paltrow was subsequently accused of "supporting genocide". American progressive magazine Mother Jones and celebrities Denise Gough and activist Alana Hadid criticized Paltrow.

An opinion piece in The Telegraph by Poppie Platt defended Paltrow, describing her as a victim of the "pro-Gaza mob".
