= Linus Karp =

Swedish actor, director, and writer

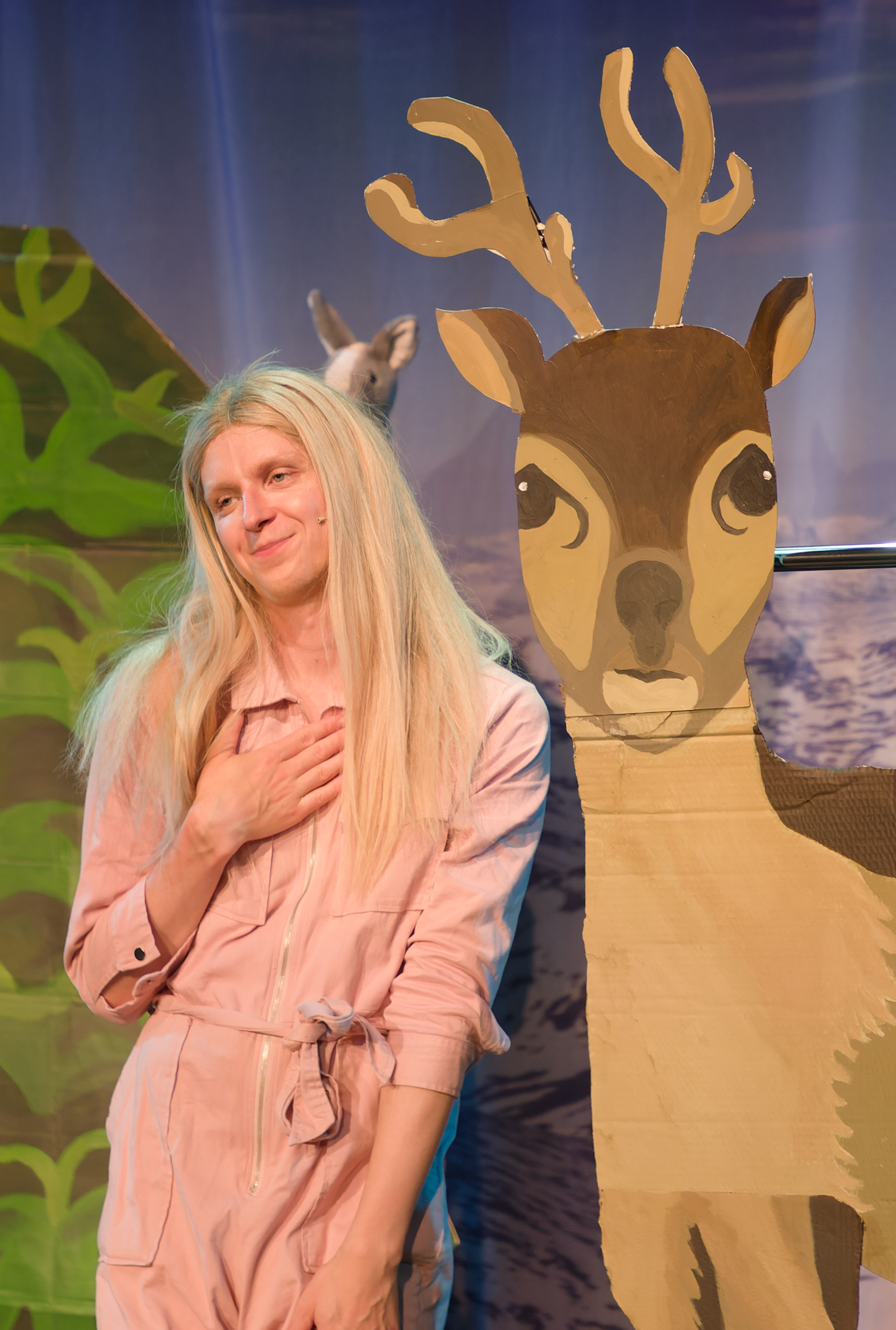
- Karp performing Gwyneth Goes Skiing at 2024 Edinburgh Festival Fringe
- Known for: Directing, producing, acting, comedy, one-person shows
- Notable work: Gwyneth Goes Skiing, Diana: The Untold and Untrue Story
- Style: Camp, drag, comedy
- Awards: OffFest Award for Best Play - Edinburgh Fringe 2023

Linus Karp is an actor, director, and writer from Sweden best known for theatrical productions that comment on pop culture. He has created the shows How to Live a Jellicle Life, Diana: The Untold and Untrue Story, and Gwyneth Goes Skiing. Karp has acted in the films Hope of Deliverance (2014), Mile End (2015), and A Fistful of Karma (2022).

== Career ==
Linus Karp and his partner Joseph Martin co-created Awkward Productions in 2017. This production company came about in part due to a desire to play roles Karp would not have been otherwise selected for (such as Princess Diana), due to his identity.

Karp initially rose to fame in 2017 as a result of Awkward Productions' first hit show, an adaption of Rob Hays' Awkward Conversations With Animals I Have F*cked. Karp played "lovelorn loser" Bobby in an initial run the Lion and Unicorn Theatre in London. Following excellent reviews the show went on to Edinburgh Fringe in 2018 and then a world tour, ended with a final run at the King's Head Theatre, London in 2019.

Following this success, Karp set out to write his own solo show. He was inspired by the 2019 movie Cats to write How to Live a Jellicle Life: Life Lessons Learned from the Hit 2019 Movie Cats during the COVID-19 lockdown. The show played at the 2022 and 2023 Edinburgh Fringe Festival and has been performed in London.

Linus Karp's next role was as Princess Diana in his next creation, Diana: The Untold and Untrue Story. The show began as a 60th birthday gift for Karp's mother-in-law before getting developed into a full solo show. The show follows Princess Diana, who narrates the events of her life from Heaven. The show has had a UK run, a London residency at The King's Head Theatre in spring 2024, and a sold-out run at the 2023 Edinburgh Fringe Festival. Diana also played at the 2024 Edinburgh Fringe Festival. The playscript for Diana: The Untold and Untrue Story has been published internationally in paperback by Reconnecting Rainbows Press.

In early 2024, Awkward Productions staged their next production, Gwyneth Goes Skiing, at The Pleasance Theatre in London. This is the first non-solo show that the company has produced, going on the 2024 Edinburgh Fringe Festival and a US tour including performances in LA, and Off-Broadway, in January 2025. Inspired by the 2016 skiing incident featuring Oscar winner Gwyneth Paltrow, the show featured Karp as Paltrow and Joseph Martin as Terry Sanderson, with original music by Leland, an American singer-songwriter who has written for RuPaul’s Drag Race and Troye Sivan’s Something to Give Each Other.

On 27 March 2025, Awkward Productions announced a new show written by and starring Linus Karp and Joseph Martin, titled The Fit Prince (who gets switched on the square in the frosty castle the night before (insert public holiday here)). According to Karp, the show follows the fictional country of Swedonia, where the king has died and the prince must marry or forfeit the crown. Meanwhile, in New York, a struggling baker receives a mysterious royal commission to create a wedding cake for the Swedonian prince. The show will play at the Edinburgh Fringe Festival in the Pleasance Courtyard before a run in London at the King's Head Theatre in December 2025 and January 2026.

== Notable works ==
- How to Live a Jellicle Life
- Diana: The Untold and Untrue Story
- Gwyneth Goes Skiing

== Awards ==
- OffFest Award for Best Play - Edinburgh Fringe 2023

== See also ==
- Leland
- Camp
