= Polar Bear, Polar Bear, What Do You Hear? =

1991 children's picture book

- Front cover, designed by Eric Carle
- Author: Bill Martin Jr.
- Illustrator: Eric Carle
- Cover artist: Eric Carle
- Language: English
- Subject: Zoo, animals, sounds
- Genre: Children's literature
- Publisher: Henry Holt and Company
- Publication date: October 15, 1991
- Publication place: United States
- Media type: Picture book
- Preceded by: Brown Bear, Brown Bear, What Do You See?
- Followed by: Panda Bear, Panda Bear, What Do You See?

Polar Bear, Polar Bear, What Do You Hear? is a 1991 children's picture book, written by Bill Martin Jr. and illustrated by Eric Carle. It was published by Henry Holt and Company.

== Summary ==
The book is designed to help toddlers identify wild animals (from the zoo) and the noises they make. It features a polar bear, a lion, a hippopotamus, a flamingo, a zebra, a boa constrictor, an elephant, a leopard, a peacock, a walrus, a zookeeper, and children dressed like animals and making their sounds ("growling like a polar bear, roaring like a lion.")

This is a companion book to Martin and Carle's 1967 Brown Bear, Brown Bear, What Do You See?, replacing the earlier book's colors and common animals with sounds and more exotic animals.

== Background ==
The 1967 publication of Brown Bear, Brown Bear distinguished Martin as a leading children’s author and Carle’s successful career as an illustrator. in 1992, 25 years later, the two collaborated a second time on Polar Bear, Polar Bear, What Do You Hear? They released their third “bear book” Panda Bear, Panda Bear, What Do You See? in 2003. Martin died in 2004; a fourth book, Baby Bear, Baby Bear, What Do You See? was published posthumously in 2007.

== Artwork ==
To achieve Eric Carle's signature collage style, he used tracing paper, a utility blade, adhesive, and tissue papers painted with acrylic.

== Reception ==
Wrote Publisher's Weekly, "It’s been 25 years since these two talented men put their heads together, but the fruit of their latest collaboration is well worth the wait." Kirkus Reviews observed, "Carle's bold, colorful art has become a bit more sophisticated, though no more appealing." In Music Educators Journal, Jana R. Fallin suggested using the book as a pedagogical tool: "Brown Bear, Brown Bear, What Do You See? and Polar Bear, Polar Bear, What Do You Hear? are excellent books for having children add sounds associated with words in the text....The children see the picture of a lion and add a body sound or instrumental sound, creating a sound composition as they go through the book."

== See also ==
- Brown Bear, Brown Bear, What Do You See?
- Baby Bear, Baby Bear, What Do You See?
- Panda Bear, Panda Bear, What Do You See?
