= John Archambault =

American writer

- Occupations: Children's book author; poet; story teller; musician

John Archambault is an American children's book author, poet, story teller, and musician. He is known best for his best selling children's book Chicka Chicka Boom Boom (1989). Among his most recognizable children's books are Knots on a Counting Rope, Barn Dance, Boom Chicka Rock, Here Are My Hands, and The Birth of a Whale. Archambault was an avid reader from a young age, ultimately sparking his interest in writing. Throughout his career he has enjoyed collaboration with Bill Martin, Jr., also a children's book author. Archambault currently resides in Yorba Linda, California.

== Early life ==
Originally from Pasadena, California, Archambault had his heart set on becoming a writer from the time he was a third grader. After reading E.B. White's children's classic Charlotte's Web, he recalls telling his teacher that he wanted to become a writer before she confronted him with the fact that if he wanted to be a writer, he had to be a reader. Archambault soon began his professional writing career in the tenth grade when he took a position working part-time for his local newspaper where he continued to gain experience through the duration of his high school years.

== Education ==
In his undergraduate years, Archambault studied writing and journalism at the University of California, Riverside. As the editor of the campus newspaper, The Highlander, he continued to foster his passion for writing. During graduate school, Archambault first met Martin who had been an established children's writer and educator for years. The pair's first work, The Ghost-Eye Tree, was published in 1988. Archambault also attended Columbia Teacher's College where he earned his teaching certificate.

== Career ==
Archambault has enjoyed a career in writing, poetry, storytelling, and music in which he has traveled the country sharing the joys of reading with children and teachers alike. Archambault has created six musical CD compilations and written over a twenty books for children. Throughout his career, he has strived to turn learning, something that so many children dread, into an enjoyable experience. He was recruited to teach a first grade class in Bronx, NY where he worked to help his students get excited about reading.

== Publications ==
=== With Bill Martin, Jr. ===
- Chicka Chicka Boom Boom
- Knots on a Counting Rope
- Barn Dance
- The Ghost-Eye Tree
- Listen to the Rain
- White Dynamite and Curly Kidd
- The Magic Pumpkin
- Here Are My Hands
- Up and Down on the Merry-Go-Round
- A Beautiful Feast for a Big King Cat
- Chicka Chicka Sticka Sticka

=== Other publications ===
- The Birth of a Whale
- Counting Kittens
- The Fox and the Chicken
- Grandmother's Garden
- I Love the Mountains
- Counting Sheep
- Boom Chicka Rock
- Toot! Toot! Quack! Quack!
- Grandmother's Garden
- I Paint a Rainbow
- Rhythm! Rhythm!
- By the Baobab Tree
- Turtle Song
