= Brown Bear, Brown Bear, What Do You See? =

1967 children's picture book

- Front cover, designed by Eric Carle
- Author: Bill Martin Jr.
- Illustrator: Eric Carle
- Cover artist: Eric Carle
- Language: English
- Subject: Colors, animals
- Genre: Children's literature
- Publisher: Doubleday & Company (later published by Henry Holt and Company)
- Publication date: 1967
- Publication place: United States
- Media type: Picture Book
- Followed by: Polar Bear, Polar Bear, What Do You Hear?

Brown Bear, Brown Bear, What Do You See? is a children's picture book published in 1967 by Henry Holt and Company, Inc. Written by Bill Martin Jr. and illustrated by Eric Carle, the book is designed to help toddlers build language and memory skills through repetition while learning the names of animals and colors. The book has been widely praised by parents and teachers and placed on several recognition lists. In 2010, the book was briefly banned from Texas’ third grade curriculum due to a confusion between author Bill Martin Jr. and philosopher Bill Martin, author of Ethical Marxism: The Categorical Imperative of Liberation (Creative Marxism).

== Background ==
Brown Bear, Brown Bear, What Do You See? is one of over 300 children's books written by Bill Martin Jr. He got the inspiration for the book's distinctive rhythm on his usual 30-minute morning commute on the Long Island Railroad, and scribbled the text in the margins of his newspaper. By the time the train pulled into Grand Central Station, he was finished. He came across an ad in a magazine created by Eric Carle for Chlor-Trimeton featuring a lobster collaged from tissue paper, and asked him to illustrate the book.

Martin and Carle write poetic books they wished they had access to as students. They use simple and rhythmic language to help students transition from reading to writing. Martin begins by establishing a rhythm that is then repeated throughout the book. American author and illustrator Steven Kellogg has said that this exposes "children to the 'music of language.'" Martin believes the rhythms resonates with children, even if they do not understand the content.

== Summary ==
The narrator asks various animals and people what they see. Their response is an observation of another animal or person, which again prompts the initial question, "What Do You See?" This process creates a rhythmic pattern that is consistent throughout the book. The 1984 edition begins with a brown bear, then features a red bird, a yellow duck, a blue horse, a green frog, a purple cat, a white dog, a black sheep, a orange goldfish, a grey mouse, a pink elephant, a tan monkey, a teacher (who was published in some of the other editions as a mother), and lastly, children, who repeat all the animals.

== Publication history ==
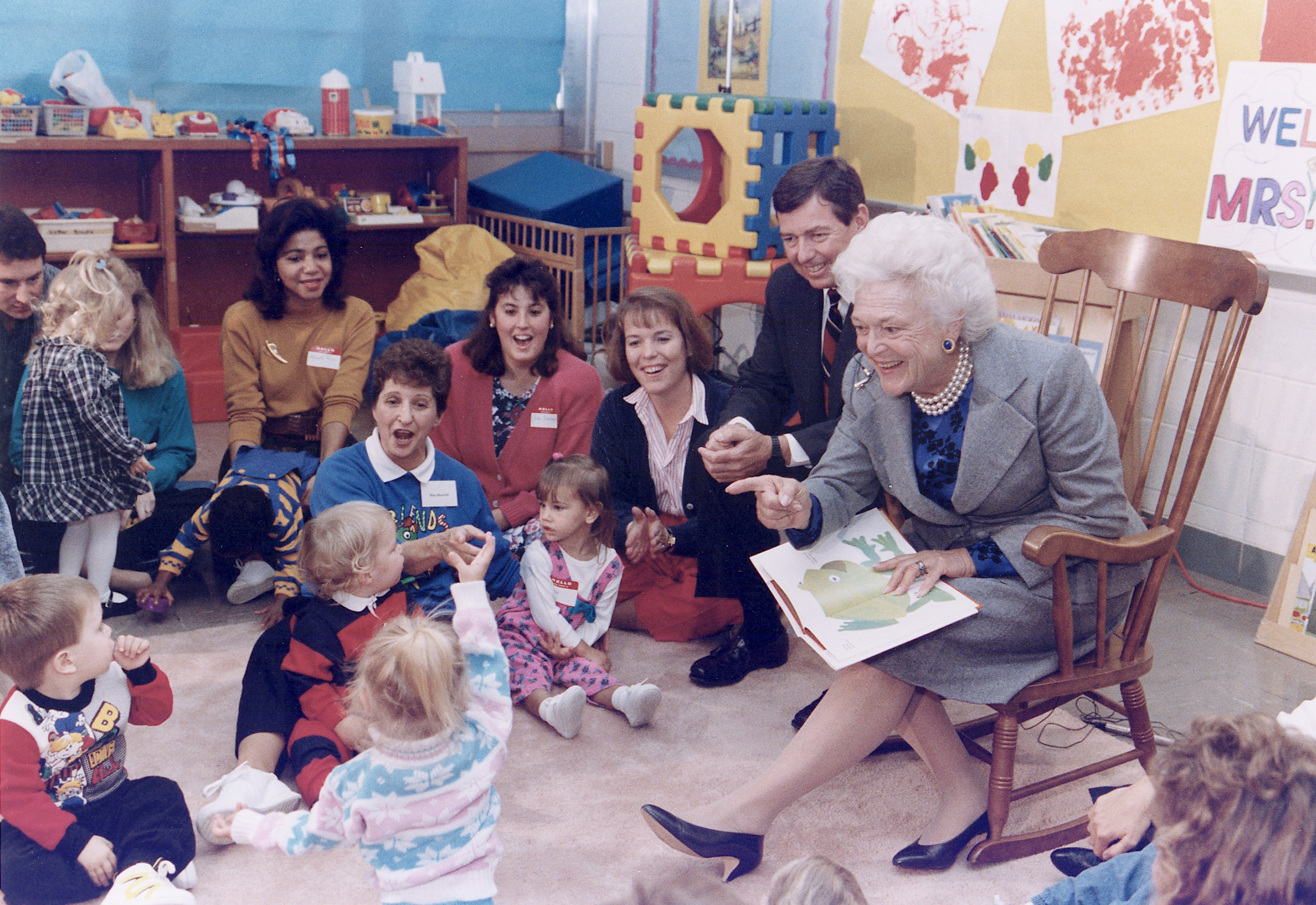
Missouri Governor John Ashcroft and First Lady Barbara Bush with a "Parents as Teachers" group at the Greater St. Louis Ferguson-Florissant School District in October 1991. Bush (in a rocking chair) is reading Brown Bear, Brown Bear, What Do You See? to the children.

Brown Bear, Brown Bear, What Do You See? was published in 1967 by Doubleday and Company. By 2003, over 8 million hardcover copies had been sold, and the book translated into eight languages.

There are four editions of Brown Bear, Brown Bear, What Do You See? with differing endings. Carle explained that variations in text between editions (mostly on the last page) were due to Martin, and that Carle made new illustrations to go with the changes. The 1967 first edition was created for the educational market only, and the final pages of the book feature a teacher. Some later trade editions replace the teacher with a mother. The 1970 edition includes a grey mouse between the blue horse and the green frog, and a pink elephant between the purple cat and the white dog. The 1984 UK edition substitutes a monkey for the teacher.

The 1992 edition restored Martin's original text with the teacher at the end, while Carle created new pictures based on the originals, intended to better represent the intended colors.

== Reception ==
The book was listed as one of the "Top 100 Picture Books" of all time in a 2012 poll by School Library Journal. As of 2013, it ranked 21st on a Goodreads list of "Best Children's Books." The book has been praised by many parents and school teachers. Martin and Carle's collaborations included three sequels: Polar Bear, Polar Bear, What Do You Hear?, Panda Bear, Panda Bear, What Do You See?, and Baby Bear, Baby Bear, What Do You See?.

=== Texas State Board of Education banning ===
In 2010, the Texas State Board of Education removed Brown Bear, Brown Bear, What Do You See from the statewide social studies curriculum because board members mistook the author for an unrelated philosopher, Bill Martin, who had recently published the 2008 book Ethical Marxism: The Categorical Imperative of Liberation. Texas Board of Education member Pat Hardy cited the latter's "very strong critiques of capitalism and the American System." Bill Martin Jr. had died in 2004. Hardy later admitted to doing little to no research herself into Ethical Marxism, instead "trusting the research of another board member", who, it was reported, had not read it either. The banning raised concerns about the board's ability to update the Texas Essential Knowledge and Skills and other statewide standards.

== See also ==
- Polar Bear, Polar Bear, What Do You Hear?
- Panda Bear, Panda Bear, What Do You See?
- Baby Bear, Baby Bear, What Do You See?
