= Panda Bear, Panda Bear, What Do You See? =

2003 children's picture book

- Front cover, designed by Eric Carle
- Author: Bill Martin Jr.
- Illustrator: Eric Carle
- Cover artist: Eric Carle
- Language: English
- Subject: Endangered species
- Genre: Children's literature
- Publisher: Henry Holt and Company
- Publication date: 2003
- Publication place: United States
- Media type: Picture book
- Pages: 26 pages
- ISBN: 978-0-8050-8078-0
- Preceded by: Polar Bear, Polar Bear, What Do You Hear?
- Followed by: Baby Bear, Baby Bear, What Do You See?

Panda Bear, Panda Bear, What Do You See? is a 2003 children's picture book by Bill Martin Jr. and illustrated by Eric Carle. Published by Henry Holt and Company, it is the third companion book to Brown Bear, Brown Bear, What Do You See?

== Summary ==
In rhyming text, various endangered animals are asked the question "What do you see?" The list of animals includes a panda bear, a bald eagle, a water buffalo, a spider monkey, a green sea turtle, a macaroni penguin, a sea lion, a red wolf, a whooping crane and a black panther. The final pages portray a dreaming child who sees all the animals "wild and free."

== Background ==
Both Martin and Carle were committed to the protection of the environment and endangered species. In tandem with the publication of Panda Bear, Panda Bear, the Eric Carle Museum of Picture Book Art exhibited "Environmental Eric Carle," highlighting not only picture book illustrations by Carle, who was friends with Jane Goodall, but posters he created in the 1970s depicting endangered animals.

== Reception ==
Publisher's Weekly observed, "[Carle] creates a sense of forward motion through his positioning of the animals (they all face toward the right-hand page)." The Horn Book wrote, "Carle's striking, brilliantly colored illustrations are as eye-catching as always, making this ideal for use with groups." School Library Journal wrote, "Names like 'macaroni penguin' contribute to some awkwardness in the text's rhythm, but the bright collage images and lilting language bring the animals to life on the page—soaring, swinging, or even strutting. Opening with a helpful note on the importance of animal protection, this title will make a perfect segue into conversations about endangered species."

== See also ==
- Brown Bear, Brown Bear, What Do You See?
- Polar Bear, Polar Bear, What Do You Hear?
- Baby Bear, Baby Bear, What Do You See?
