= Baby Bear, Baby Bear, What Do You See? =

2007 children's picture book

- Front cover, designed by Eric Carle
- Author: Bill Martin Jr.
- Illustrator: Eric Carle
- Cover artist: Eric Carle
- Language: English
- Genre: Children's literature
- Publisher: Henry Holt and Company
- Publication date: 2007
- Publication place: United States
- Media type: Picture book
- Preceded by: Panda Bear, Panda Bear, What Do You See?

Baby Bear, Baby Bear, What Do You See? is a 2007 children's picture book by Bill Martin Jr. and Eric Carle. First published by Henry Holt and Company and currently published by Penguin Random House, it is the fourth and final companion title to Brown Bear, Brown Bear, What Do You See?

== Summary ==
A baby bear meets a series of native North American animals—a red fox, a flying squirrel, a mountain goat, a blue heron, a prairie dog, a striped skunk, a mule deer, a rattlesnake and a screech owl—while searching for its mother.

== Background ==
Like its predecessor Panda Bear, Panda Bear What Do You See, Baby Bear, Baby Bear was intended to draw attention to the issue of conservation. In his author's note, Martin writes:

North America is filled with thousands of species of wildlife. These creatures have lived in their habitats for centuries. Together, we can work to ensure that they will remain wild and free forever.

Martin died in 2004 at the age of 88. This book, drawing the four-volume series to a close, was published posthumously three years later.

== Reception ==
School Library Journal wrote, "The animals, in colorful collages set against stark white backgrounds, strut, slide, glide, and hoot across the full spreads. A terrific read-aloud destined to rank high with the other titles by Martin and Carle." Publisher's Weekly wrote, "The elegant balance of art, text, emotion and exposition is a Martin and Carle hallmark; they have crafted a lovely finale to an enduring series."

== See also ==
- Brown Bear, Brown Bear, What Do You See?
- Polar Bear, Polar Bear, What Do You Hear?
- Panda Bear, Panda Bear, What Do You See?
