= David Plummer (musician) =

David Roy Plummer is an English musician and author of children's books and music. In 1968, he graduated from Reigate School of Art and Design. He signed record deals in London with EMI, CBS, and President Records. As a session musician (bass player/singer) he recorded and toured the United Kingdom and Europe with several bands (with

Kenny among others), appeared on BBC Television's Top of the Pops and worked as a singer-songwriter and record producer.

Plummer teamed up with John Archambault to put music to the best selling children's book Chicka Chicka Boom Boom [by Bill Martin, Jr. & John Archambault]. The project won an American Library Association’s Notable Children's Recording as well as a Parents' Choice Gold Award. Since then, they have completed six music albums under the name John & David on the Youngheart Music record label. Plummer has performed at workshops, assemblies and conferences nationally over the last fourteen years.
