= Michael Sampson =

American writer

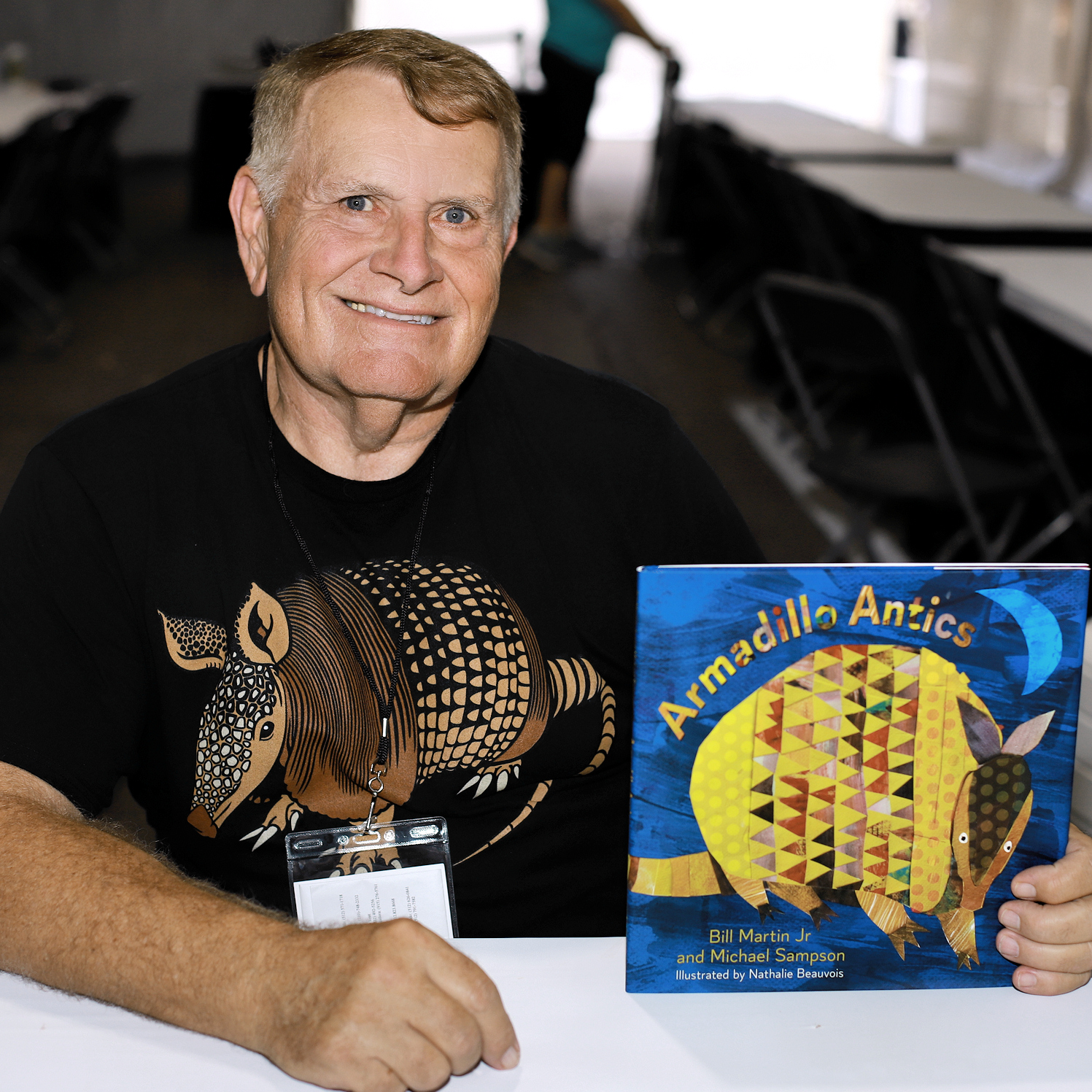
- Sampson at the 2022 Texas Book Festival.
- Born: Michael Roy Sampson; Denison, Texas, USA
- Occupations: Academic and writer
- Writing career
- Period: 1986–present
- Genre: Children's fiction
- Website: www.michaelsampson.com

Dr. Michael Sampson is a Fulbright Scholar and an American children's author best known for easy-to-read books that feature rhythmic and repetitive language. Sampson's first children's book, The Football That Won, was written solo in 1992 and illustrated by Ted Rand. Later, Sampson wrote 21 books with his best friend and mentor Bill Martin, Jr., including Chicka Chicka 1, 2, 3 and The Bill Martin Jr Big Book of Poetry.

Sampson taught at Texas A&M University–Commerce for 25 years before moving to the University of South Florida St. Petersburg. In August 2010, he was selected as Dean of the School of Education at Southern Connecticut State University. In July 2012, he became Dean of the College of Education at Northern Arizona University. In the summer of 2014, he moved to New York City to become Dean of the School of Education at St. John's University. In 2021–2022, he taught at a university in Europe as a Fulbright Scholar.

== Early life ==
Sampson was born in Denison, Texas, to Roy and Ida Faye Sampson. He studied in the Denison public schools until grade three, at which time his family (brothers Bill and Bryan and sister Patsy) moved to Tom Bean, Texas. He had written a series of books featuring Frank and Joe of The Hardy Boys fame, and even had a poem published in a national magazine.

During summers, he worked as a lumberjack in Damariscotta, Maine. Sampson played football during middle school and high school. As a senior, he was a captain on the Tom Bean Tomcats football team, where he won the school's academic award and was named to the Class B Texas State All Star Team.

== Education ==
During high school, Michael Sampson won a scholarship to East Texas State University, where he earned a degree in 1974 in Political Science with a teaching endorsement. He became a teacher in the Commerce public schools, where he taught grades K-3; 4, and 6. During this time he attended evening classes, earning a Master of Sciences degree in Reading. He left Texas for Arizona in 1977 to enroll in the Ph.D. program at the University of Arizona. He completed his Ph.D. in Reading in 1980.

== Collaboration with Bill Martin Jr ==
Michael Sampson met children's author and educator Bill Martin Jr at a reading conference in Tucson, Arizona in 1978. Within five years, the two had built the conferences into the Pathways to Literacy Conference, with sites in 12 American cities. For the next 12 years, Sampson and Martin wrote daily, author twenty-one children's books.

Speaking of his writing partner, Sampson said: "Poetry allowed him to become a reader – if he could hear it, he could read it. And as a writer, Bill worked with his ear. How his writing sounded was the most important thing. Poetry was his mentor. It inspired and guided him."

== Later life ==
After his tenure as a professor at Texas A&M University–Commerce. Sampson left for full-time writing and consulting in 2004. He made visits across the United States and countries in South America and Eastern and Western Europe, including Italy, Great Britain, Germany and Ukraine.

In 2007, Sampson returned to academia to teach writing and research at the University of South Florida St. Petersburg. In 2010 Sampson became Dean of the School of Education at Southern Connecticut State University. In July 2012, he became dean of the College of Education at Northern Arizona University. Since 2014, he has lived and worked at St. John's University in New York City.

In the spring of 2020, Sampson was named by the US Department of State as a Fulbright Scholar to Ukraine for 2021. His assignment was delayed by the COVID-19 pandemic until Fall 2021, where he taught at Oles Honchar Dnipro National University and Alfred Nobel University. He was evacuated from Ukraine due to the Russian invasion in Feb 2022 to Warsaw, where he continued to support Ukraine through his works.

== Awards ==
- ALA Notable Children's Book (2003);
- Book Links Editor's Best of 2003;
- Chicago Public Library Best Books for Children and Teens;
- Parenting Magazine Book of the Year, 2004;
- Kansas 2005 Picture Book Award;
- Oppenheim Toy Portfolio Gold Award.
- Philadelphia Children's Please Touch Museum Book of the Year, 2007;
- New York Public Library 100 Best Books for Reading and Sharing, 2008;
- Children's Literature Association of Utah's Beehive Book Award, 2011.

== Published Works ==
=== Children's book ===
- Si Won's Victory. By Bill Martin Jr & Michael Sampson. Illustrations by Floyd Cooper. Celebration Press, 1996
- Yummy Tum Tee. By Bill Martin Jr & Michael Sampson. Illustrated by Olivier Dunrea. Celebration Press, 1996
- The Football That Won... Illustrated by Ted Rand. Henry Holt, 1996.
- City Scenes. By Bill Martin Jr & Michael Sampson. New Zealand: Learning Media, 1997.
- Wild Bear. By Mary Beth and Michael Sampson. New Zealand: Learning Media, 1997
- Football Fever. New Zealand: Learning Media, 1997
- Star of the Circus. By Michael and Mary Beth Sampson. Illustrated by Jose Aruego. Holt, 1997.
- Swish! By Bill Martin Jr & Michael Sampson.New York: Henry Holt, 1997.
- Wild Bear. Mary Beth & Michael Sampson (Reprinted in Spanish). New Zealand: Learning Media, 1999.
- City Scenes. By Bill Martin Jr & Michael Sampson (Reprinted in Spanish). New Zealand: Learning Media, 1999.
- The Football That Won... New York: Henry Holt, 1999.
- Adam, Adam, What Do You See? By Bill Martin Jr and Michael Sampson. Illustrated by Cathy Felstead. Nashville: Thomas Nelson & Co, 2000.
- Adam, Adam, What Do You See? By Bill Martin Jr and Michael Sampson. Illustrated by Cathy Felstead. Boston: Candlewick Press, 2001.
- Little Granny Quarterback. By Bill Martin Jr and Michael Sampson. Illustrated by Michael Chesworth. Boston: Boyds Mills Press, 2001.
- The Little Squeegy Bug. By Bill Martin Jr and Michael Sampson. Illustrated by Patrick Corrigan. New York: Winslow Press, 2001.
- Rocket, Socket, Number Line. By Bill Martin Jr and Michael Sampson. Illustrated by Keith Baker. New York: Henry Holt, 2001.
- I Pledge Allegiance. By Bill Martin Jr and Michael Sampson. Boston: Candlewick, 2002
- Caddie the Gold Dog. By Michael Sampson & Bill Martin Jr. New York: Walker & Co, 2002
- Trick or Treat. By Bill Martin Jr and Michael Sampson. New York: Simon & Schuster, 2002
- Panda Bear, Panda Bear, What Do You See? With Bill Martin Jr (Ghost). New York: Henry Holt, 2003
- Chicken Chuck By Bill & Bernard Martin and Michael Sampson. New York: Marshall Cavendish, 2004.
- Chicka, Chicka, 1, 2, 3. By Bill Martin Jr and Michael Sampson. New York: Simon & Schuster, 2004.
- I Love Our Earth. By Bill Martin Jr and Michael Sampson. Watertown, MA: Charlesbridge, 2006
- Baby Bear, Baby Bear, Baby, Bear, What Do You See? With Bill Martin Jr (Ghost). New York: Henry Holt, 2007.
- Kitty Cat, Kitty Cat, Are you waking up? By Bill Martin Jr and Michael Sampson. New York: Marshall Cavendish, 2008.
- Bill Martin Jr Big Book of Poetry. By Bill Martin Jr and Michael Sampson. New York: Simon & Schuster, 2008
- Brown Bear and Friends. New York: Henry Holt, 2008. (Compilation; Sampson co-authored two of the four stories)
- I Love Our Earth. By Bill Martin Jr and Michael Sampson. Watertown, MA: Charlesbridge, 2009. (new paperback edition)
- Kitty Cat, Kitty Cat, Are you Going to Sleep? By Bill Martin Jr and Michael Sampson. New York: Marshall Cavendish, 2011.
- Kitty Cat, Kitty Cat, Are you Going to School? By Bill Martin Jr and Michael Sampson. New York: Two Lions Press, Amazon, 2013.
- Listen to Our World By Bill Martin Jr and Michael Sampson. New York: Simon & Schuster, 2016.
- Noah, Noah, What Do You See? By Bill Martin Jr and Michael Sampson. New York: HarperCollins, 2017.
- Spunky Little Monkey By Bill Martin Jr and Michael Sampson. New York: Scholastic, 2017.
- Chica chica uno dos tres. By Bill Martin Jr and Michael Sampson. New York: Simon & Schuster, 2020.
- Armadillo Antics. By Bill Martin Jr and Michael Sampson. Dallas: Brown Books Kids, 2022.
- The Story of Ukraine: An Anthem of Glory and Freedom. (2022) By Olena Kharchenko and Michael Sampson. New York: Brown Books Kids, 2022.
- Ten Little Squirrels. By Bill Martin Jr and Michael Sampson. New York: Brown Books Kids, 2022.
- Bing! Bang! Chugga! Beep! By Bill Martin Jr and Michael Sampson. New York: Brown Books Kids, 2023.
- The Pig, the Elephant and the Wise Cracking Owl. By Michael Sampson and Bonnie Johnson. New York: Brown Books Kids, 2023.

=== Academic publications ===
- Sampson, M.R. "Secondary school reading programs with a research base." Research on Reading in Secondary Schools, eds. J.L. Vaughan, Jr. and P.J. Gaus (Tucson, Ariz.: College of Education, 1978), pp. 29–39.
- Sampson, M.R. and Sampson, M.B. "Components of a language experience approach." Catalyst for Change: Journal of the National School Development Council, 1980, 9, 10–14.
- Briggs, L.D. and Sampson, M.R. "Developing interest in reading." Home Ideas for Reading, May 1980, 4, 1–3.
- Sampson, M.R. and Santos, S. "The bilingual child in your classroom: Tips for reading instruction." Perspectives on Reading and Bilingualism, Spring 1981, 3–11.
- Sampson, M.R. and Briggs, L.D. "What does research say about beginning reading?" Reading Horizons, Winter 1981, 21, 114–118.
- Sampson, M.R., Valmont, W.J. and Allen, R.V. "The effects of instructional cloze on the comprehension, vocabulary, and divergent production of third-grade students." Reading Research Quarterly, 1982, 17, 389–399.
- Sampson, M. R. "A comparison of the complexity of children's dictation and instructional reading materials." New Inquiries in Reading Research and Instruction. National Reading Conference 1982 Yearbook, 177–180.
- Breen, R.B. and Sampson, M.R. "Learning through affirmative reading." The Creative Child and Adult Quarterly, Spring 1983, 36–38.
- Sampson, M.R. and Thomason, T. "Reading: A skill the Christian home can't afford to neglect." Christian Life, November 1983, 88–89, 94.
- Sampson, M.R., Briggs, L.D. and Coker, D.R. "Assessing the listening comprehension of children." Reading Improvement. Spring 1984, 21, 59–63.
- Sampson, M.R. and Briggs, L.D. "A new technique for cloze scoring: A semantically consistent method." Clearing House, December 1983, 57, 177–179.
- Sampson, M.R. "Focus on comprehension: ReQuest." Ohio Reading Teacher, April 1984, 3, 13–15.
- Sampson, M.R. and Thomason, T. "Preschool literacy." Tender Years, September 1984, 4, 26–28.
- Sampson, M.R. and Breen, R.B. "Reading begins at home: Guidelines for parents." ACT, May/June, 1984, 4, 4–5.
- Sampson, M.R. and Breen, R.B. "Reading begins at home: Old myths and new research." ACT, April, 1984, 3, 6–9.
- Iley, J.L. and Sampson, M.R. "Reading: The smart way." Industrial Education, May 1984, 22.
- Sampson, M.R. and Thomason, T. "Children's 'mistakes' in reading: Should we correct them?" NABE Journal IX, No. 1, Fall 1984, 8–11.
- Sampson, M.R. and Thomason, T. "When to teach reading: They're never too young to begin." Living With Preschoolers, November, 1985, 16–20.
- Sampson, M.R., Briggs, L.D. and Sampson, M.B. "Language, Children, and Text: Match or Mismatch?" In M.R. Sampson (Ed.) The Pursuit of Literacy: Early Reading and Writing. Dubuque: Kendall/Hunt Publishing Company, 1986, 97–103.
- Sampson, M.B., Sampson, M.R., and Briggs, L.D. "Miscues and learning." Reading: From Theory To Practice. 1986 Yearbook of the State of Maryland, International Reading Association, 1986, 28–32.
- Sampson, M.R. White, J.H., and Briggs, L.D. "Student authorship and reading: The joy of literacy." Reading Improvement, Summer 1988.
- Sampson, M.B., Sampson, M.R. and Linek, W. "Circle of questions." The Reading Teacher, Spring 1995.
- Kanouse, C., Sampson, M.R. and Coker, D.R. "University Faculty Development in the Professional Development School." Catalyst for Change, Fall 1995.
- Sampson, M. B., Linek, W. M., & Sampson, M. R. (1999). "Circle of questions/circle of knowledge: A strategy to foster college students’ engagement with text." Innovative learning strategies: College reading improvement yearbook.
- Sampson, M. R. & Sampson, M. B. (1999). "The Language Experience Approach: Yesterday, Today and Tomorrow." In O. G. Nelson and W. M. Linek (Eds.), Practical classroom Applications of Language Experience: Looking Back and Looking Forward. pp. 263–268. Boston: Allyn and Bacon.
- Sampson, M.R. & Sampson, M.B. (2004) Literacy. The International Institute of Literacy Learning. Dallas, TX.
- Sampson, M.B., Sampson, M.R. & Rasinski, T. (2003) Total Literacy: Pathways to Reading, Writing and Learning. Wadsworth: San Francisco.
- Sampson, M. R. (2008). "Language for Literacy." Reporter: Journal of the NYS Association for the Education of Young Children, Spring 2008, pp. 14–19.
- Torre, C.E. and Sampson, M. R. (2012) Toward a Culture of Educational Assessment in Daily Life. In Constance M. Yowell and Lee Shulman, (Eds) The Future of Assessment in Education, Columbia University Press.http://www.gordoncommission.org/rsc/pdf/torre_sampson_toward_culture_ educational_assessment.pdf
- Sampson, M.R. (2013) Literacies and the 21st Century Child. In Powell, P. & Wiebke, K., Eds) Strong Start: Early Education in Arizona, 107–116.
- Sampson, M.R. (2014) Learning to read naturally: The Martin model of reading. Childhood Education International: Early Years. 1–2.
- Sampson, M.R. (2014) Curriculum for e-Learners: Reading and writing. In R. Papa, (Ed) Media rich instruction: Connecting curriculum to all learners. Dordrecht, The Netherlands: Springer.
- Sampson, M. R., Ortlieb, E., & Leung, C. B. (2016). Rethinking the writing process: What best-selling and award-winning authors have to say. Journal of Adolescent & Adult Literacy, 60(3), 265–274.
