= David Plummer (photographer) =

British wildlife photographer

- Born: David Alexander Plummer
- Occupations: Wildlife photographer, filmmaker, author, naturalist, conservationist
- Known for: Wildlife photography; 7 Years of Camera Shake (2017); Shaking Hands with the Devil (2023)
- Website: https://davidplummer.co.uk

David Alexander Plummer is a British wildlife photographer, filmmaker, author, naturalist and conservationist. His work encompasses wildlife photography, natural history filmmaking, fieldcraft and conservation education, with particular expertise in birds, especially owls, and butterflies.

Plummer's wildlife photographs have appeared in specialist publications and the national and international press. He was shortlisted for Wildlife Photographer of the Year in 2016 and is the author of 7 Years of Camera Shake (2017), which documents his photographic work following his diagnosis of Parkinson's disease in 2009. His television and film work includes contributions to BBC natural history productions, including Wild Isles (2023), as well as wildlife consultancy and documentary filmmaking.

Plummer was the subject of 15 Years (2023), a short documentary directed by Katie Mayhew that received a Golden Wing Grand Award at the Hungarian Special Film Festival. He also appeared in Shaking Hands with the Devil, a documentary examining the stigma surrounding Parkinson's disease in Kenya, which received a Bronze Judges' Award at the 2024 Smiley Charity Film Awards. In 2025, he contributed to Super Nature, a feature-length documentary directed by Ed Sayers that premiered at the BFI London Film Festival.

Plummer previously worked as a resident wildlife photographer at the Knepp Estate rewilding project in West Sussex. He has served as a trustee of Sussex Wildlife Trust since March 2024 and contributed to the Parkinson's UK garden at the 2026 RHS Chelsea Flower Show, which received the BBC/RHS People's Choice Award for Best Show Garden.

== Early life ==
Plummer developed an interest in wildlife during childhood, spending time observing insects, breeding butterflies and studying animals in their natural habitats. His early interest in wildlife photography was influenced by the work of British bird photographer Eric Hosking, whom he heard interviewed on BBC Radio.

He began experimenting with photography using a second-hand Prinzflex 35mm single-lens reflex camera. Initially photographing wildlife and plants in his local surroundings, he developed his photographic techniques through observation and field experience.

Plummer began his working career at the age of 17 as a police cadet, subsequently serving as a police officer for the Metropolitan Police. He then transferred to the Caribbean, where he continued working as a police officer, before pursuing a professional career in wildlife photography.

His early photographic work concentrated on British wildlife, particularly in Kent and Sussex, before expanding to international locations, including Africa, South America and the Galápagos Islands.

== Career ==
=== Wildlife photography ===
Plummer established his career photographing wildlife in Britain and internationally, with particular interests in birds, mammals and animal behaviour. His work has taken him to locations including the Pantanal wetlands of Brazil, where he has photographed wildlife since the late 1990s.

He readily adopts fieldcraft, animal behaviour and the use of hides and camouflage into his photographic approach.

He previously worked at the Knepp Estate in West Sussex, where he was involved in wildlife photography, photographic safaris and fieldcraft instruction.

Plummer’s observations of fallow deer at the Knepp Estate were featured in the companion book to the BBC natural history series Wild Isles. The book quotes his accounts of the annual deer rut and the behaviour of competing males.

In 2016, Plummer was shortlisted for Wildlife Photographer of the Year. The following year he published, 7 Years of Camera Shake: One Man's Passion for Photographing Wildlife, a collection of more than 200 photographs taken following his diagnosis of Parkinson's disease in 2009. The book features wildlife photographed in Britain and internationally, accompanied by accounts of his photographic experiences.

=== Film and Television ===
Plummer has worked as a wildlife consultant, photographer and filmmaker on natural history television productions and documentary films. His work has included contributions to BBC programmes, including Springwatch and Wild Isles (2023), for which he provided footage of tawny owls.

He has worked with wildlife presenter Hamza Yassin on several BBC productions. In 2023, he appeared in Hamza: Strictly Birds of Prey, sharing his knowledge of tawny owl behaviour and assisting with filming at his wildlife garden in West Sussex. In 2025, he contributed to Hamza's Hidden Wild Isles, assisting with the observation of wild badgers in Sussex for the episode Spring, featuring Yassin and his two nieces. He also appeared in Winter, in which Yassin returned to Plummer's garden to film wild tawny owls.

Plummer has appeared on BBC television programmes, including BBC Breakfast and The One Show. In 2010, he assisted with wildlife photography in Scrag Copse. In March 2016, he demonstrated wildlife photography techniques using a floating hide on The One Show. He also appeared on the programme to discuss his experience of living with Parkinson's disease and his photographic career. In September 2017, he was interviewed on BBC Breakfast about his book 7 Years of Camera Shake, his career and his experience of Parkinson's disease. He later appeared on BBC Breakfast to discuss Shaking Hands with the Devil, a documentary examining the experiences of people living with Parkinson's disease in Kenya.

Plummer has also been interviewed on BBC radio, including BBC Radio 4's Today programme, BBC Radio 2's Jeremy Vine programme, BBC Sussex and BBC Southern Counties Radio.

In 2018, Plummer appeared in an advertising campaign for Huawei's P20 Pro smartphone, produced by German advertising agency Jung von Matt. The campaign featured his work photographing a wolf and highlighted the phone's AI-assisted camera technology in relation to his experience of Parkinson's disease. Five photographs taken during filming were auctioned to raise funds for the German Society for Parkinson's and Movement Disorders.

Plummer was credited as a wildlife consultant on Wilding (2023), a documentary directed by David Allen about the rewilding of the Knepp Estate in West Sussex.

In 2023, Plummer appeared alongside artist Alex Echo and musician Nigel Bates in Passion, Purpose & Parkinson's, a short documentary directed by Olz McCoy about their experiences of pursuing creative careers following Parkinson's diagnoses.

The same year, Plummer was the subject of 15 Years, a short documentary directed by Katie Mayhew examining his photographic career and the challenges presented by Parkinson's disease. The film received a Golden Wing Grand Award at the 2023 Hungarian Special Film Festival and was screened at the IN THE PALACE International Short Film Festival in 2024.

Plummer also featured in Shaking Hands with the Devil., a documentary directed by Olz McCoy examining the stigma and discrimination experienced by people with Parkinson's disease in Kenya The film was nominated in the Golden Pier Short Documentary category at the 2024 Cannes Film Awards. and received a Bronze Judges' Award at the 2024 Smiley Charity Film Awards

In 2025, Plummer contributed to Super Nature, a feature-length documentary directed by Ed Sayers and filmed on Super 8. The film premiered at the BFI London Film Festival in October 2025 and was released in UK cinemas in September 2026.

=== Conservation and education ===
Plummer's work includes wildlife conservation, environmental education and photographic tuition.

His involvement with conservation organisations includes his work at the Knepp Estate rewilding project in West Sussex and his support for Sussex Wildlife Trust through photography, filmmaking and educational activities. On 6 March 2024, he was appointed a trustee of Sussex Wildlife Trust, a conservation charity working to protect wildlife and habitats across Sussex.

Plummer is a Gardens and Greenspaces Ambassador for Weald to Waves, a Sussex nature-recovery initiative seeking to connect habitats across the county. In this role, he promotes wildlife-friendly gardening and habitat creation.

At his home in West Sussex, he has developed a wildlife garden used for observing, photographing and filming wildlife. He shares his experience of wildlife gardening and habitat creation through educational activities and advice.

His educational work includes photographic tuition and fieldcraft instruction, with guided wildlife photography experiences focused on observing animals in their natural environments.

In 2026, Plummer contributed to the development of the Parkinson's UK garden at the RHS Chelsea Flower Show. Garden designer Arit Anderson visited his wildlife garden in Sussex to discuss how gardening helps him manage Parkinson's disease and how adaptations to outdoor spaces can support people living with the condition. The garden received the BBC/RHS People's Choice Award for Best Show Garden.

== Parkinson's disease and advocacy ==
Plummer was diagnosed with Parkinson's disease in 2009. He has spoken publicly about the effects of the condition on his life and career, including the physical challenges associated with wildlife photography His experience of living with Parkinson's is documented in his book 7 Years of Camera Shake and in several television and documentary productions.

He has also participated in Parkinson's disease awareness activities through interviews and documentary appearances. He also gives public talks on wildlife photography, conservation and his experiences of living with Parkinson's disease

== Awards and recognition ==
The following recognition includes Plummer's photographic achievements and awards or nominations received by productions to which he contributed.

| Year | Award or recognition | Work |
|---|---|---|
| 2016 | Wildlife Photographer of the Year - shortlisted | Wildlife photography |
| 2023 | Hungarian Special Film Festival: Golden Wing Grand Award | 15 Years |
| 2024 | Cannes World Film Festival - Remember the Future: Best Film on Disability nomination | 15 Years |
| 2024 | Cannes Film Awards: Golden Pier Short Documentary | Shaking Hands with the Devil |
| 2024 | Smiley Charity Film Awards: Bronze Judges' Award | Shaking Hands with the Devil |
| 2026 | BBC/RHS People's Choice Award for Best Show Garden: contributor | Parkinson's UK garden, RHS Chelsea Flower Show |

== Filmography ==
| Year | Title | Role |
|---|---|---|
| 2010 | The One Show | Wildlife fieldcraft and contributor |
| 2016 | The One Show | Wildlife fieldcraft and filming assistant |
| 2023 | Passion, Purpose & Parkinson's | Documentary subject |
| 2023 | Springwatch | Wildlife footage contributor |
| 2023 | Wild Isles | Wildlife consultant |
| 2023 | Hamza: Strictly Birds of Prey | Wildlife expert and contributor |
| 2023 | Wilding | Wildlife consultant |
| 2023 | 15 Years | Camera operator and contributor |
| 2024 | Shaking Hands with the Devil | Executive producer and presenter |
| 2025 | Hamza's Hidden Wild Isles | Wildlife fieldcraft and contributor |
| 2025 | Super Nature | Wildlife consultant and contributor |

== Publications ==
- Plummer, David (2017). 7 Years of Camera Shake: One Man's Passion for Photographing Wildlife. Unbound. ISBN 978-1-78352-393-1.
