= Bill Martin Jr. =

American educator and author (1916–2004)

- Born: William Ivan Martin Jr. March 20, 1916; Hiawatha, Kansas, U.S.
- Died: August 11, 2004 (aged 88); Commerce, Texas, U.S.
- Occupations: Educator, publishing executive, author
- Known for: Children's literature

William Ivan Martin Jr. (March 20, 1916 – August 11, 2004) was an American educator, publishing executive, and author of more than 300 children's books including The Sounds of Mystery, Chicka Chicka Boom Boom (co-authored with John Archambault), Brown Bear, Brown Bear, What Do You See?, Baby Bear, Baby Bear, What Do You See?, Panda Bear, Panda Bear, What Do You See?, and Polar Bear, Polar Bear, What Do You Hear? (all collaborated with illustrator Eric Carle). The Bill Martin Jr. Award, which is the Kansas state award for best children's picture book, was established in his honor in 1996.

== Early life and education ==
Martin was born and raised in Hiawatha, Kansas. His father was a paperhanger and his mother was a housewife; he was one of 5 brothers. He had difficulty reading until he went to college, at the Kansas State Teacher's College in Emporia, Kansas. There he memorized poems that a teacher read aloud in class, and was then able to relate the words to what was on the page. Enthusiastic about helping other children learn to read by "[having] language inside of themselves," he went on to earn a doctorate in early childhood education from Northwestern University in 1961.

== Career ==
After graduating with his bachelor's degree, Martin taught journalism, drama, and English at high schools in Newton and St. John, Kansas. During World War II, he served in the Army Air Force as a newspaper editor and wrote his first book, The Little Squeegy Bug, published in 1945, as William Ivan Martin, with illustrations by his brother Bernard Martin. Eleanor Roosevelt praised the book in her syndicated newspaper column, "My Day," and it eventually sold 1 million copies. He wrote 10 more books with his brother and by the time of his death had published more than 300 children's books, always working with a carefully chosen illustrator. He liked to collaborate and to make many revisions until the words sounded right. Martin then worked as principal of Crow Island Elementary School in Winnetka, Illinois, and later moved to New York City and joined the publishing company Holt, Rinehart and Winston, where he was editor in chief of the school division during the 1960s and developed innovative reading programs.

In 1972, he became a full-time writer. He revitalized his publishing career when he met John Archambault in 1983 at UC Riverside. They went on to collaborate on more than a dozen award-winning books, including Chicka Chicka Boom Boom, and Barn Dance! and Knots on a Counting Rope, both Reading Rainbow featured selections, illustrated by Ted Rand. Their first joint work, "The Ghost-Eye Tree" won an IRA Children's Choice award and has remained in print for almost 30 years. During the last 15 years of his life, he co-wrote many books with Michael Sampson, whom he met at a reading conference in Tucson, Arizona in 1978. In 1992, Martin moved from New York to Texas to build a house beside Sampson on 26 acres (110,000 m^{2}) on the banks of the South Sulphur River. Martin named the land “Woodfrost” as a reflection of his love for Robert Frost and Frost's poetry about the woods. For the next 12 years, Sampson and Martin wrote daily, creating 25 books for children, including award winners: I Pledge Allegiance (illustrated by Chris Raschka) and Chicka, Chicka, 1, 2, 3, (illustrated by Lois Ehlert). A work in progress, the Bill Martin Jr Big Book of Poetry, was completed by Sampson and published by Simon and Schuster in November 2008, four years after Martin's death. Other books authored by Martin and Sampson continue to be published, including Kitty Cat, Kitty Cat, Are You Waking Up (2011), Listen to Our World (2016), and Spunky Little Monkey (2017). Armadillo Antics came out in 2022.

Martin was also active as an educational speaker and with Sampson, conducted annual workshops for educators called Pathways to Literacy that eventually trained over 50,000 teachers at 30 sites throughout the US. He was one of the first children's book authors to promote his books by touring schools and bookstores. At these appearances he read aloud to the children, often with music and dancing. He believed in instilling interest in children and helping them remember new words through rhythm and repetition. Sampson said: “Poetry allowed him to become a reader - if he could hear it, he could read it. And as a writer, Bill worked with his ear. How his writing sounded was the most important thing. Poetry was his mentor. It inspired and guided him.” During the 1950s he hosted a regional television program, The Storyteller, and he later produced audiotapes of his books.

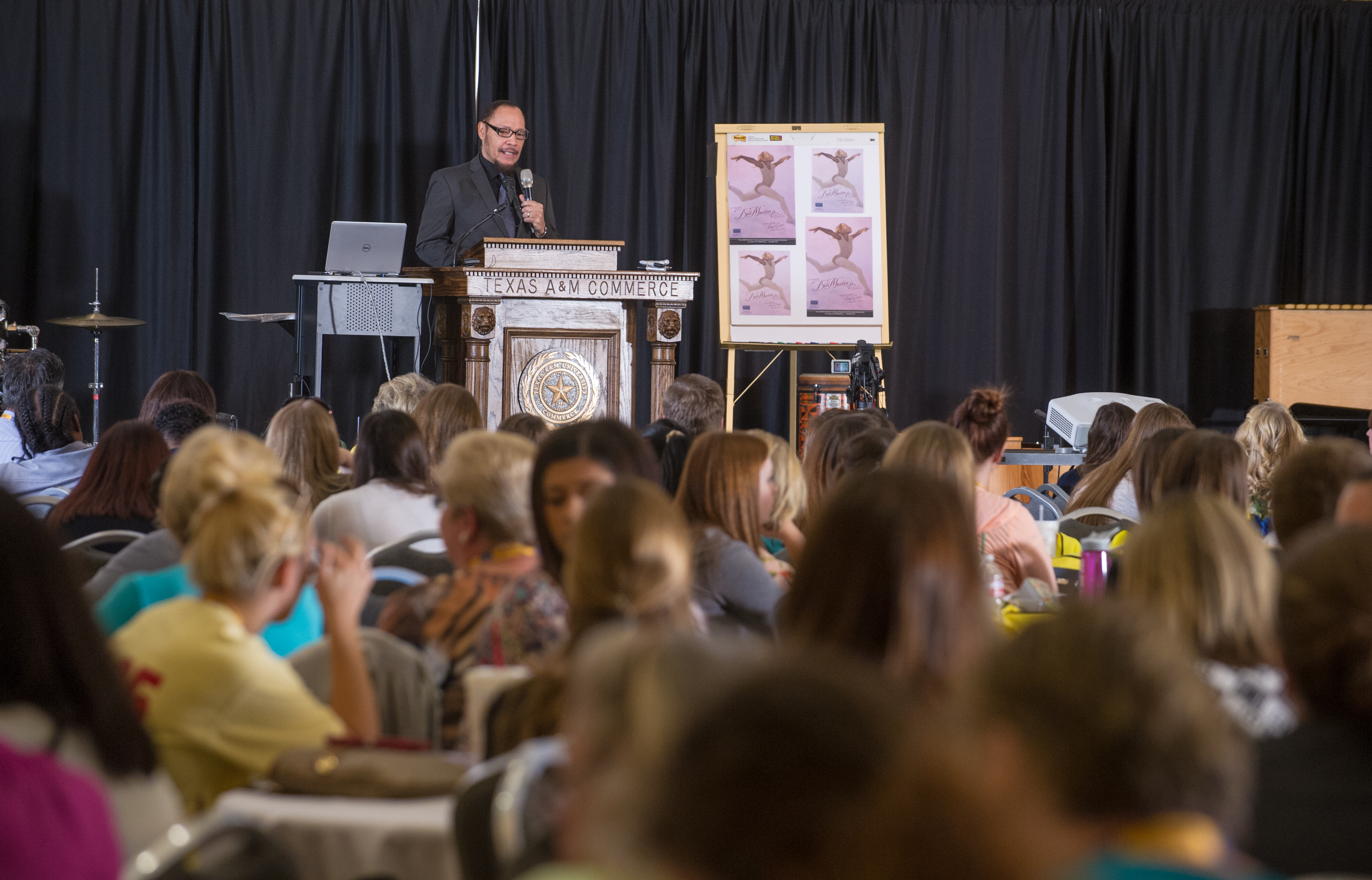
The 2015 Bill Martin Jr. Symposium at Texas A&M University–Commerce

== Personal life and legacy ==
Martin married Betty Jean Bachmann in 1942 and they divorced in 1978. He had a son (who died in 1963) and a daughter, Danielle.

Martin died in Commerce, Texas, on August 11, 2004, at the age of 88.

A library on the campus of Texas A&M University–Commerce is named in his honor and contains all his books and many artifacts. In 2000, the Morrill Public Library in Hiawatha, Kansas dedicated the Bill & Bernard Martin Children's Library in honor of Bill and his brother, Bernard, who is best known as a Midwest wildlife painter and printmaker.
