= LGBTQ literature in Brazil =

Brazilian literature focused on LGBTQ topics

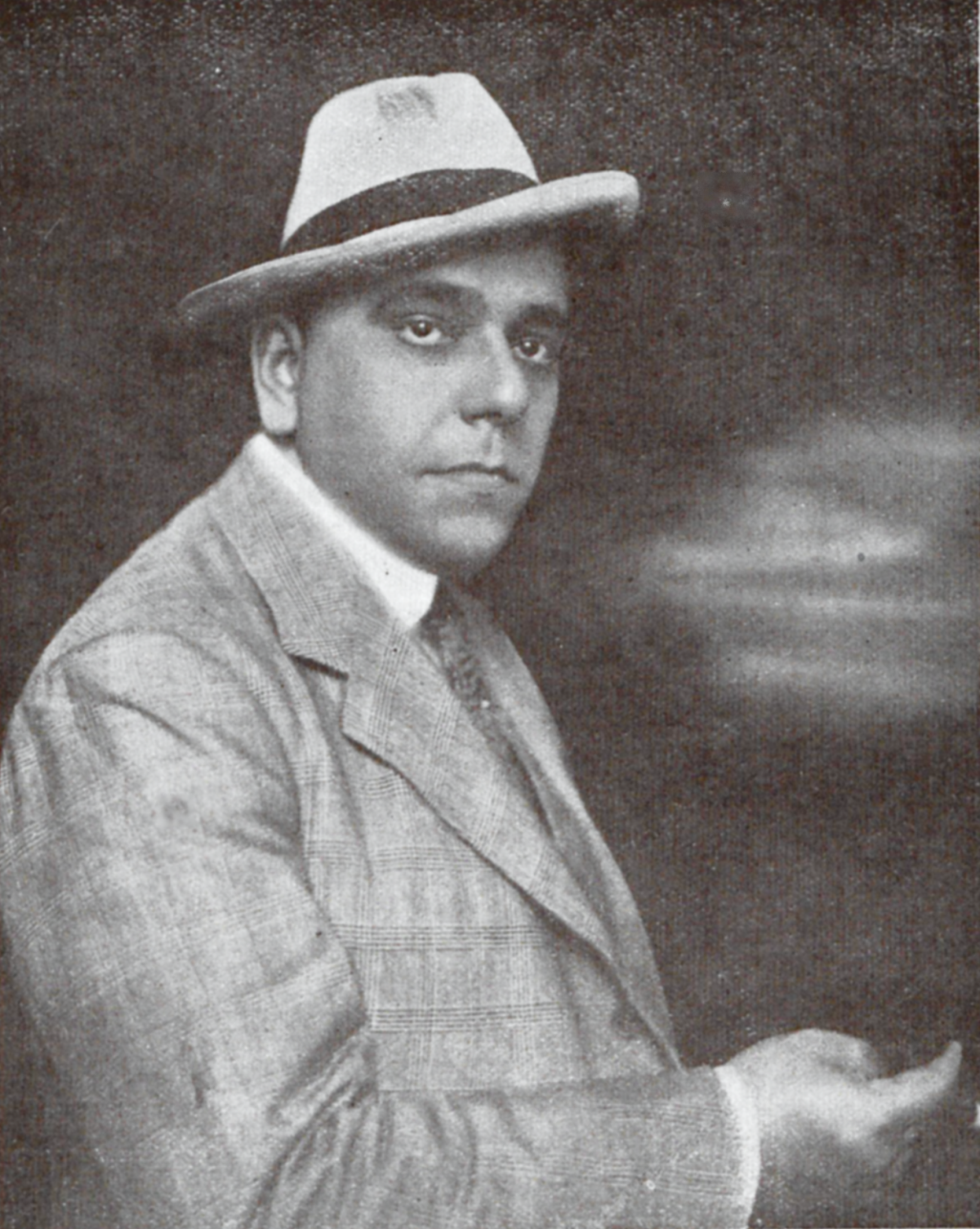
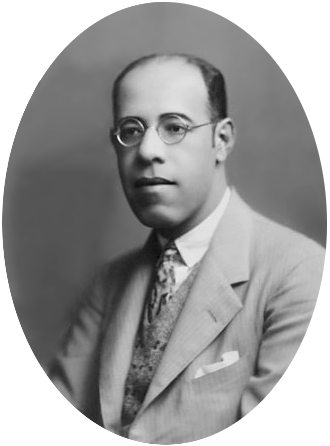
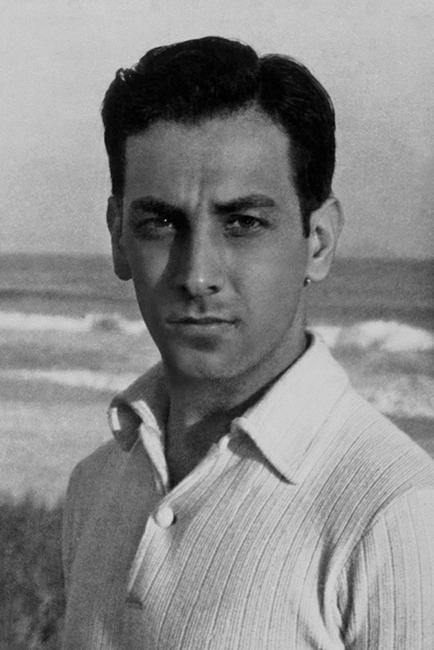
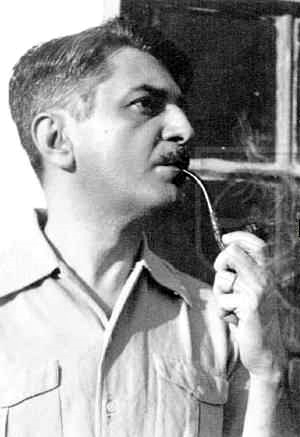
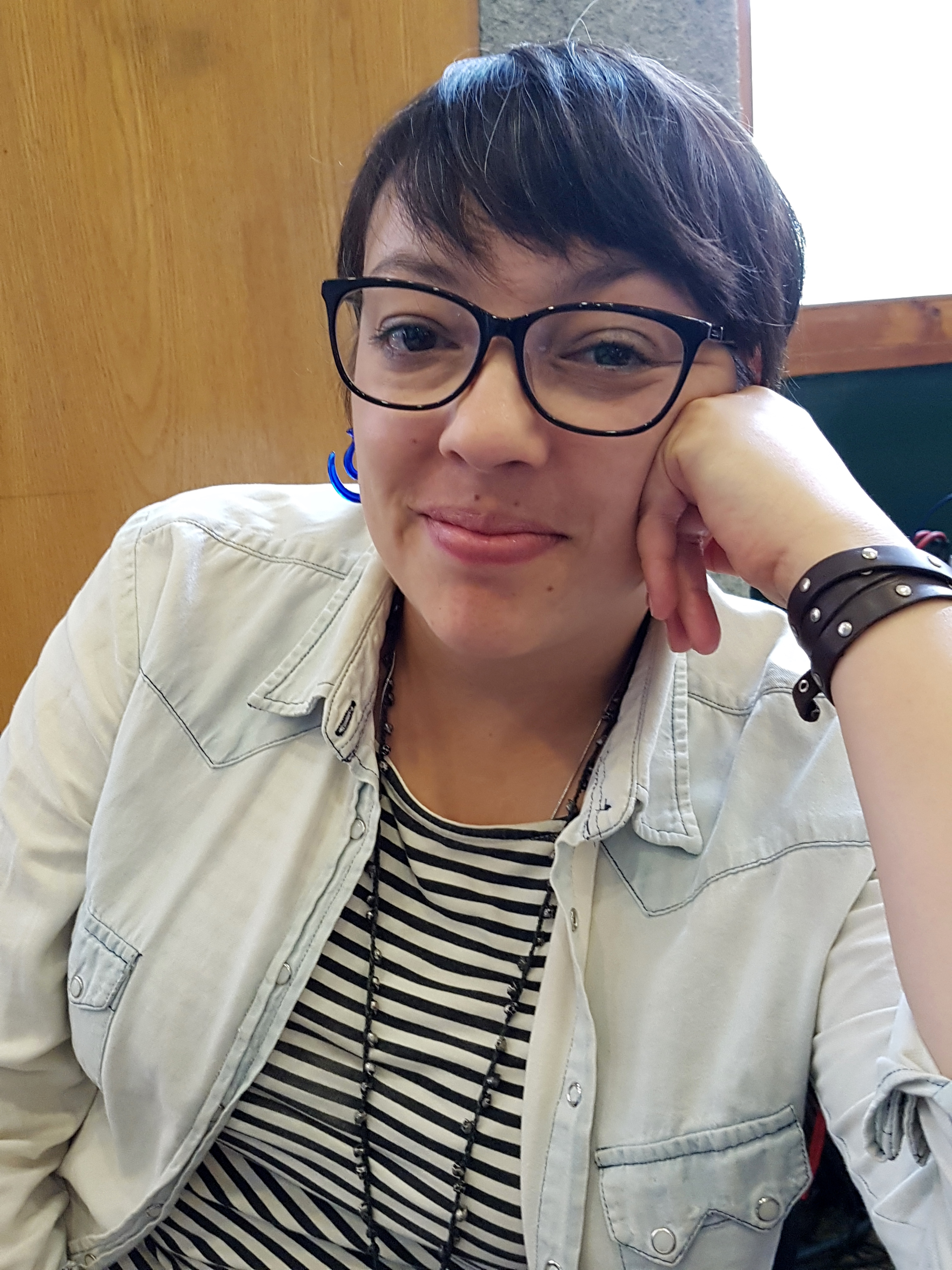
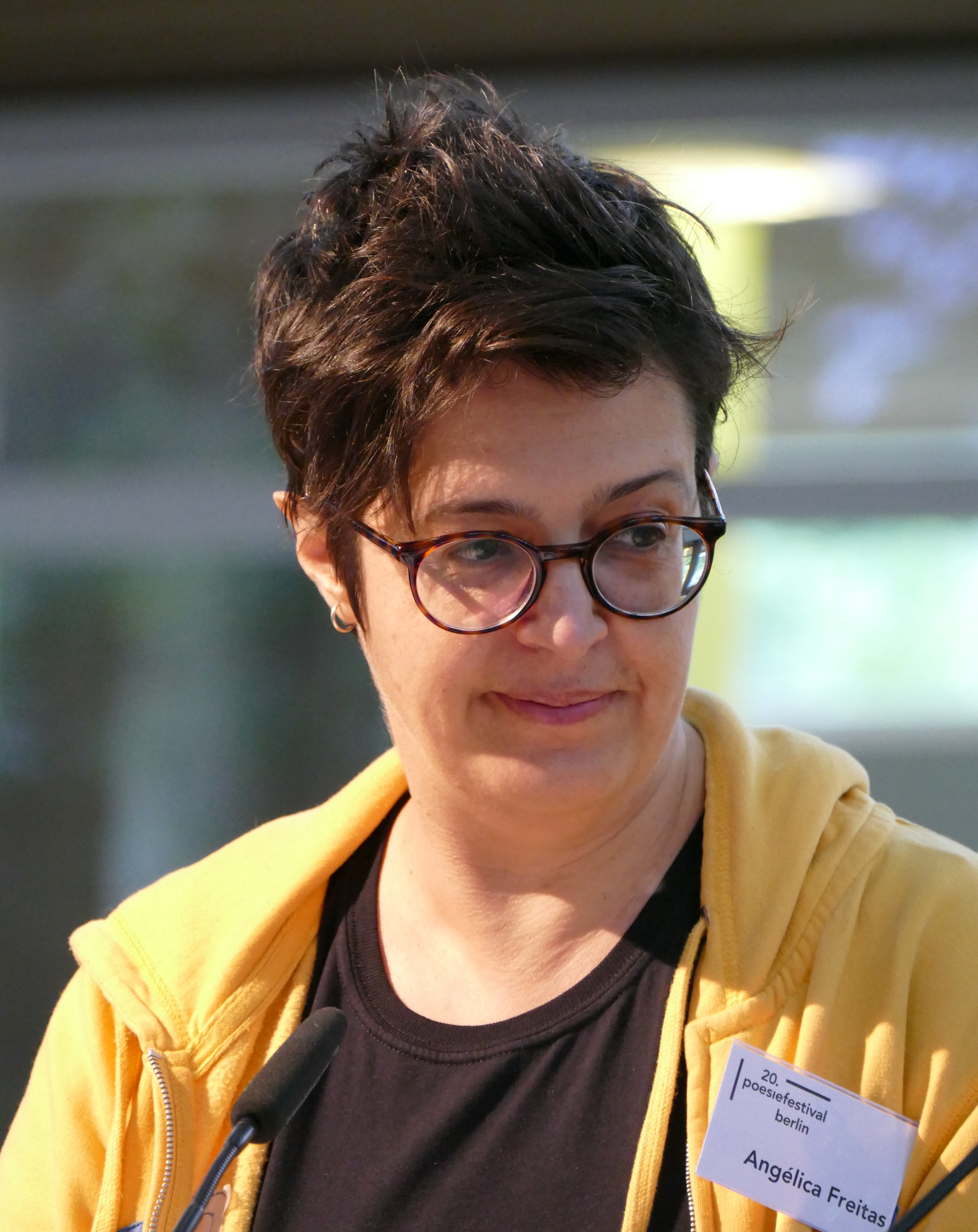
Notable LGBTQ Brazilian writers (clockwise): João do Rio, Mário de Andrade, Lúcio Cardoso, Gilberto Freyre, Natalia Borges Polesso, and Angelica Freitas.

LGBTQ literature in Brazil encompasses literature written by Brazilian authors that involves plots or characters that are part of or related to sexual diversity. It has a tradition that dates back to the seventeenth century, specifically the work of the poet Gregório de Matos, who throughout his life wrote a series of satirical poems of a homosexual nature about his political adversaries.

The first narrative works referencing homosexuality came almost two centuries later, in the 1870s and 1880s, by writers such as Joaquim Manuel de Macedo, Aluísio Azevedo, and Raul Pompéia. The works of these authors, most of which were framed in the genre of naturalism, presented a view of homosexuality based on conceptions of the time, under a negative stereotype of sexual deviation. In the midst of this context, the novel Bom-Crioulo (1895) appeared, written by Adolfo Caminha. This is traditionally pointed out as the initiator of Brazilian LGBTQ literature, in addition to being considered the first LGBTQ novel in Latin America. Although he also shared a negative view of homosexuality, he was the first to center a plot on a same-sex relationship.

The beginning of the twentieth century saw the entry of authors like João do Rio, who addressed sexual diversity in some of his stories and who were known to be homosexual, and the publication of such works as Pílades e Orestes, a homoerotic work by Joaquim Machado de Assis, and O menino do Gouveia (1914), an anonymous story considered the first LGBTQ pornographic work of Brazil. The novel Vertigem (1926), by Laura Villares, is notorious for being the first work written by a Brazilian woman to address lesbianism, although it also gives a moralistic and condemnatory view of the protagonist.

During the post-Estado Novo era, several texts continued to present LGBTQ themes in subtle forms. The paradigmatic work of this trend was Frederico Paciência (1947), a story by Mário de Andrade about a male friendship with homoerotic undertones that, despite not turning the sexual orientation of the characters explicit, was one of the first to show this attraction in a positive way. The 1950s were characterized by the publication of two classic novels of Brazilian literature that included LGBTQ subplots: Gran Sertón: Veredas (1956), by João Guimarães Rosa, and Crônica da casa assassinada (1959), by Lúcio Cardoso.These novels dealt with sexual diversity in a markedly different way from previous works, with plots that explored concepts such as spirituality, transvestism, ⁣metaphysics, and forbidden desire.

Until the second half of the twentieth century, Brazilian male homosexual literature had a common characteristic of strict roles in the relationships portrayed, with one strong, with one traditionally masculine man and another a weak and submissive man, analogous to the social gender roles present in heterosexual relationships at the time, as can be seen from Bom-Crioulo. Additionally, it was common for both male and female homosexual characters to be portrayed as caricatures or exoticized. The Brazilian Carnival was portrayed by several authors as a time when people could hide their identities and enjoy greater sexual freedom while performing acts usually considered unlawful.

The period during the military dictatorship in Brazil was characterized by strong censorship by the regime, although events such as the Stonewall riots and the birth of the modern international LGBTQ movement helped initiate a boom in the publication of LGBTQ works.

== See also ==
- LGBTQ topics in Brazil
  - LGBTQ rights in Brazil
  - LGBTQ people in Brazil
- LGBTQ literature in Argentina
- LGBTQ literature in Colombia
- LGBTQ literature in Ecuador

== Sources ==
- Albuquerque, Carlos Eduardo (2014), "A narrativa homoerótica e o cânone no Brasil: relações possíveis" (PDF), Anais X CONAGES (in Portuguese), archived from the original (PDF) on 2023-12-03
- Lima Braga, Luiz Fernando (2006). Caio Fernando Abreu: narrativa e homoerotismo (PDF) (PhD thesis) (in Portuguese). Belo Horizonte: Universidade Federal de Minas Gerais. Archived from the original on 2022-06-24.
- Lopes, Mably (2017), "Um breve histórico da literatura homoerótica no Brasil" (PDF), Anais XII Jogo do Livro e II Seminário Internacional Latino-Americano (in Portuguese), archived from the original (PDF) on 2023-08-02
- Porto, Luana Teixeira (2016). "Literatura e sociedade: uma leitura da representação da homoafetividade em contos brasileiros do século" (PDF). Signo (in Portuguese). 1: 79–87. doi:10.17058/signo.v1i1.7329. Archived from the original on 2023-08-14.
