= Traveller (1999 film) =

1999 film

- Directed by: Paulo César Saraceni
- Written by: Lúcio Cardoso; Otávio de Faria
- Starring: Marília Pêra
- Cinematography: Mário Carneiro
- Release date: July 1999 (Moscow)
- Running time: 100 minutes
- Country: Brazil
- Language: Portuguese

Traveller (Portuguese: O Viajante) is a 1999 Brazilian drama film directed by Paulo César Saraceni. It was entered into the 21st Moscow International Film Festival where it won a Special Mention.

== Cast ==
- Marília Pêra as Donana
- Leandra Leal as Sinhá
- Paulo Cesar Pereio as Chico Herrera
- Irma Álvarez as Rosália
- Roberto Bonfim
- Priscila Camargo
- Nelson Dantas as Mestre Juca
- Leina Krespi
- Jairo Mattos as Fael
- Ricardo Graça Mello as Zeca
- Ana Maria Nascimento e Silva as Anita
- Milton Nascimento
- Claudia Mauro as Sister
