= Fabrício Carpi Nejar =

Brazilian writer

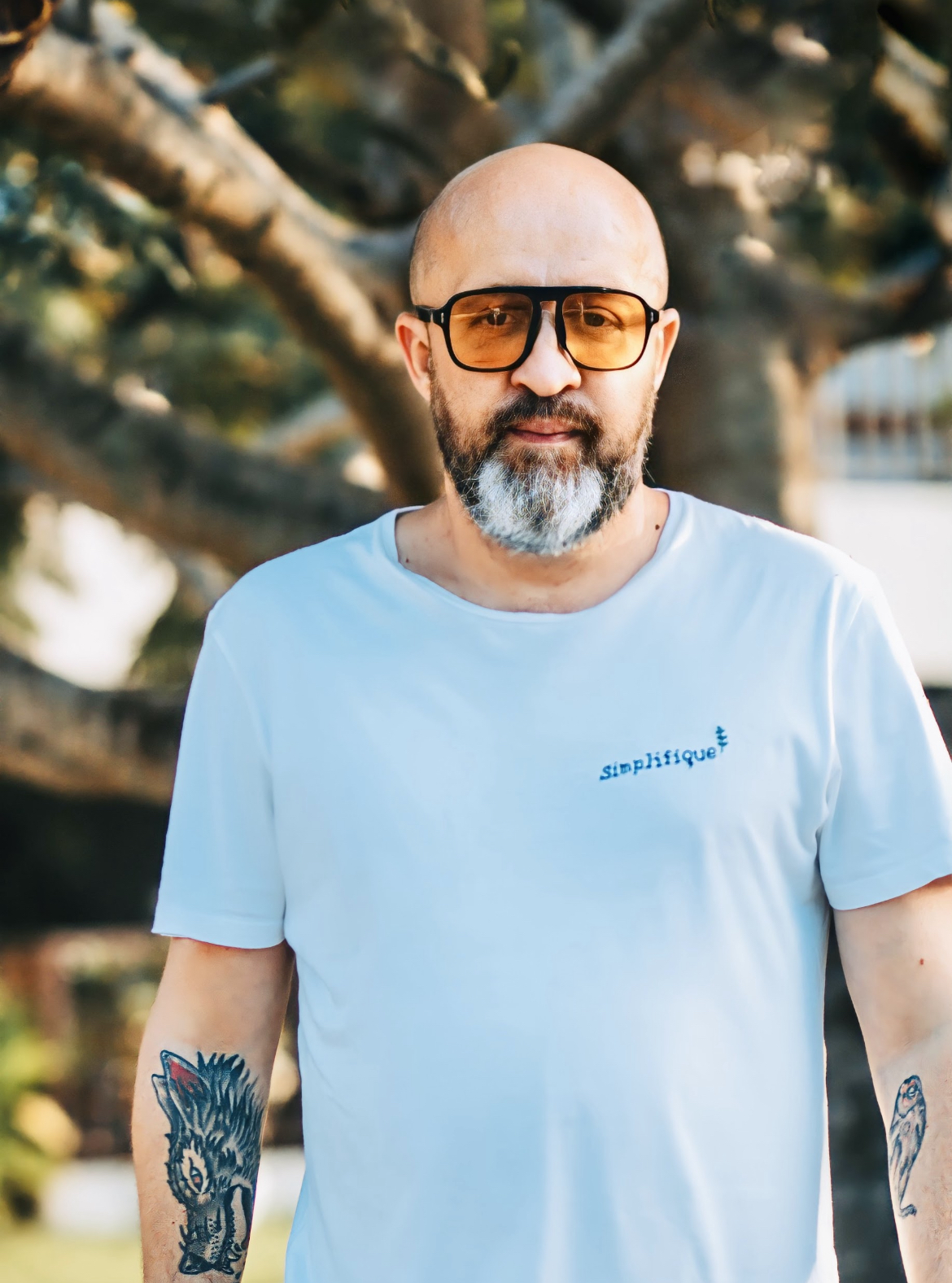
Carpinejar in 2024

Fabrício Carpinejar (Caxias do Sul, October 23, 1972) is a Brazilian writer, columnist, journalist, and lecturer.

He is the author of bestsellers in the Brazilian literary market, such as Cuide dos Pais Antes que Seja Tarde (Take Care of Your Parents Before It’s Too Late, 2018) and Manual do Luto (Manual of Grief, 2023), and has sold one million copies over the course of his career. He also won the Jabuti Prize, Brazil’s prestigious literary award, for the book Canalha! (2008) in the Short Stories and Chronicles category.

In addition, Carpinejar was awarded the National Order of Educational Merit, bestowed by the Brazilian State at the rank of Grand Officer, in recognition of his significant contributions to education in the country.

Currently, the writer works as a daily columnist for the newspaper Zero Hora, a commentator for Rádio Gaúcha, and a weekly columnist for O Tempo. He is a public speaker, having delivered presentations in Brazil and abroad.

His father is the poet Carlos Nejar, a member of the Brazilian Academy of Letters.

== Literary career ==
Fabrício Carpinejar has published 52 books in different genres, such as chronicles, poetry, children’s and young adult literature, and reportage. Described by Luis Fernando Verissimo as a “factory of lyricism”, the writer has won more than 20 literary awards over the course of his career.

=== Early years ===
Fabrício debuted in literature in 1998 with the poetry book As Solas do Sol. From that moment on, he began signing as “Carpinejar,” a fusion of his poet parents’ last names. Between 2000 and 2002, he released three more books, including Um terno de pássaros ao sul (2001), which won the Açorianos Prize for Best Poetry Book. In 2003, he won the Brazilian Academy of Letters Poetry Prize for Biografia de uma Árvore (Biography of a Tree, 2002), the most prestigious award of his career up to that point.

He debuted in children’s literature in 2004 with Porto Alegre e o dia em que a cidade fugiu de casa, a book about his hometown, Porto Alegre. In 2006, he published Filhote de Cruz Credo!, a celebrated book that addresses school bullying through an autobiographical perspective. The work won the APCA Prize for Children’s Literature and was selected for the Brazilian National Textbook Program. Carpinejar went on to publish more successful children’s books, such as Votupira: The Crazy Corner Wind (2011), which won the Jabuti Prize in the Children’s Literature category.

=== Chronicler ===
Two years after his first book of chronicles, O Amor Esquece de Começar (Love Forgets to Begin, 2006), he published Canalha! (2008), which won the Jabuti Prize in 2009. Following this he published books that were adapted to the stage such as Ai Meu Deus, Ai Meu Jesus (2012). Later, he also returned to poetry with Amor à Moda Antiga (Old-Fashioned Love, 2016).

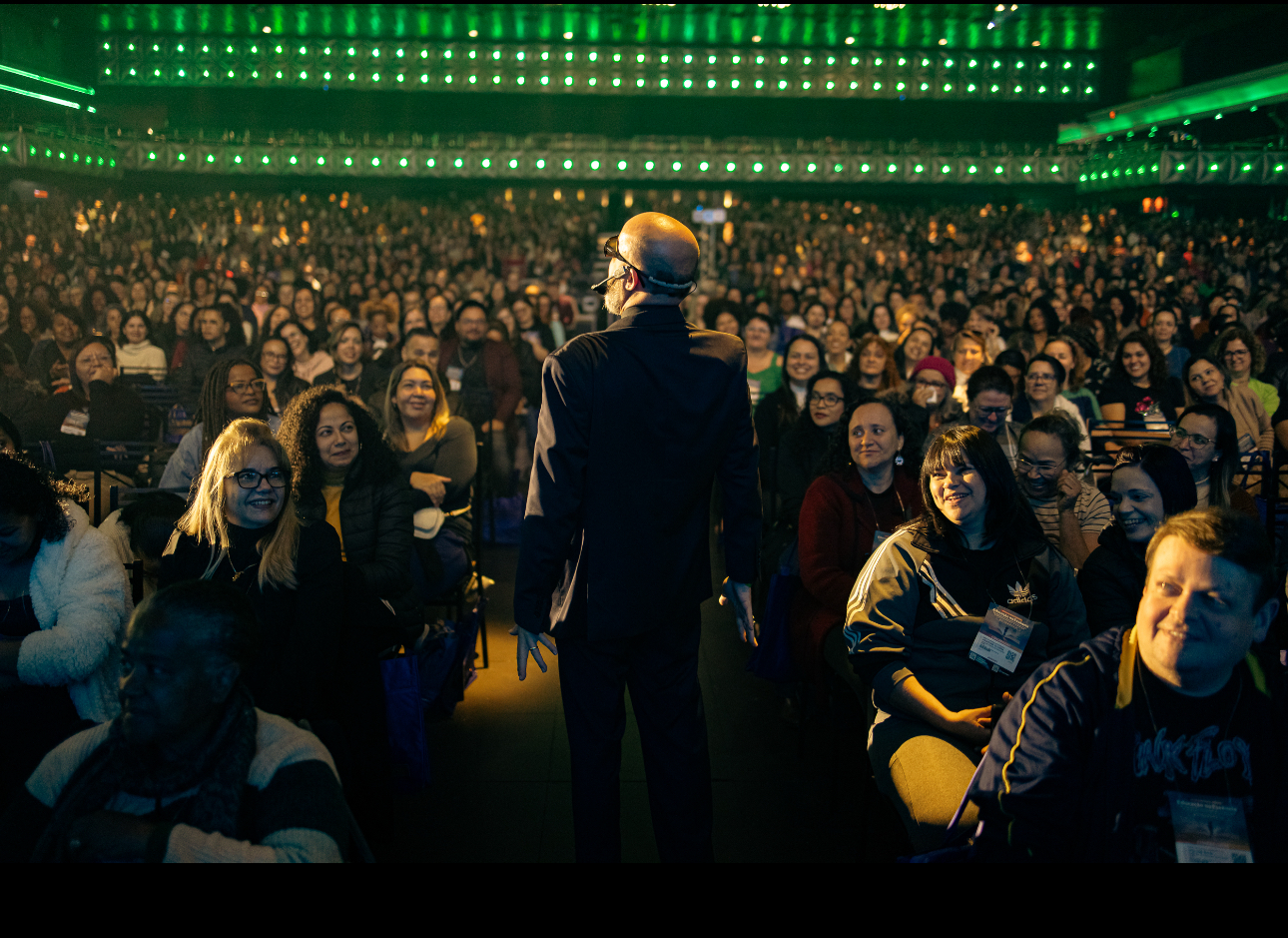
Carpinejar delivering his lecture in 2025

Between 2017 and 2018, he released several titles, including Liberdade na vida é ter um amor para se prender (Freedom in Life Is Having a Love to Hold On To, 2017), a compilation of his famous napkin phrases, Amizade é também amor (Friendship Is Also Love, 2017), and Cuide dos Pais Antes que Seja Tarde (Take Care of Your Parents Before It’s Too Late, 2018), his greatest commercial success up to that point. The book, which focuses on aging parents and is described by the author as a “breviary of kindness”, has sold over 80,000 copies, becoming a bestseller in Brazil. He then published Minha esposa tem a senha do meu celular (My Wife Has the Password to My Cell Phone, 2019) and Família é Tudo (Family Is Everything, 2019), continuing his reflective writings on family matters.

During the COVID-19 pandemic, Carpinejar released two books about affection: Colo, por favor! (A Hug, Please!, 2020) and Coragem de viver (Courage to Live, 2021), the latter a tribute to his mother, Maria Carpi. Soon after, themes of mourning and farewell became predominant in his work, beginning with Depois é nunca (Later Is Never, 2021). In 2023, another of Carpinejar’s bestseller, Manual do Luto (Manual of Grief), was released by Grupo Editorial Record. The Brazilian magazine VEJA described it as “a lesson about love, not a guide on death, but a manual for life”. In 2024, he released Se Eu Soubesse: Para Maiores de 40 Anos (If I Had Known: For Those Over 40), another commercial success that has quickly reached its fifth edition.

== Radio, Television, and Newspapers ==
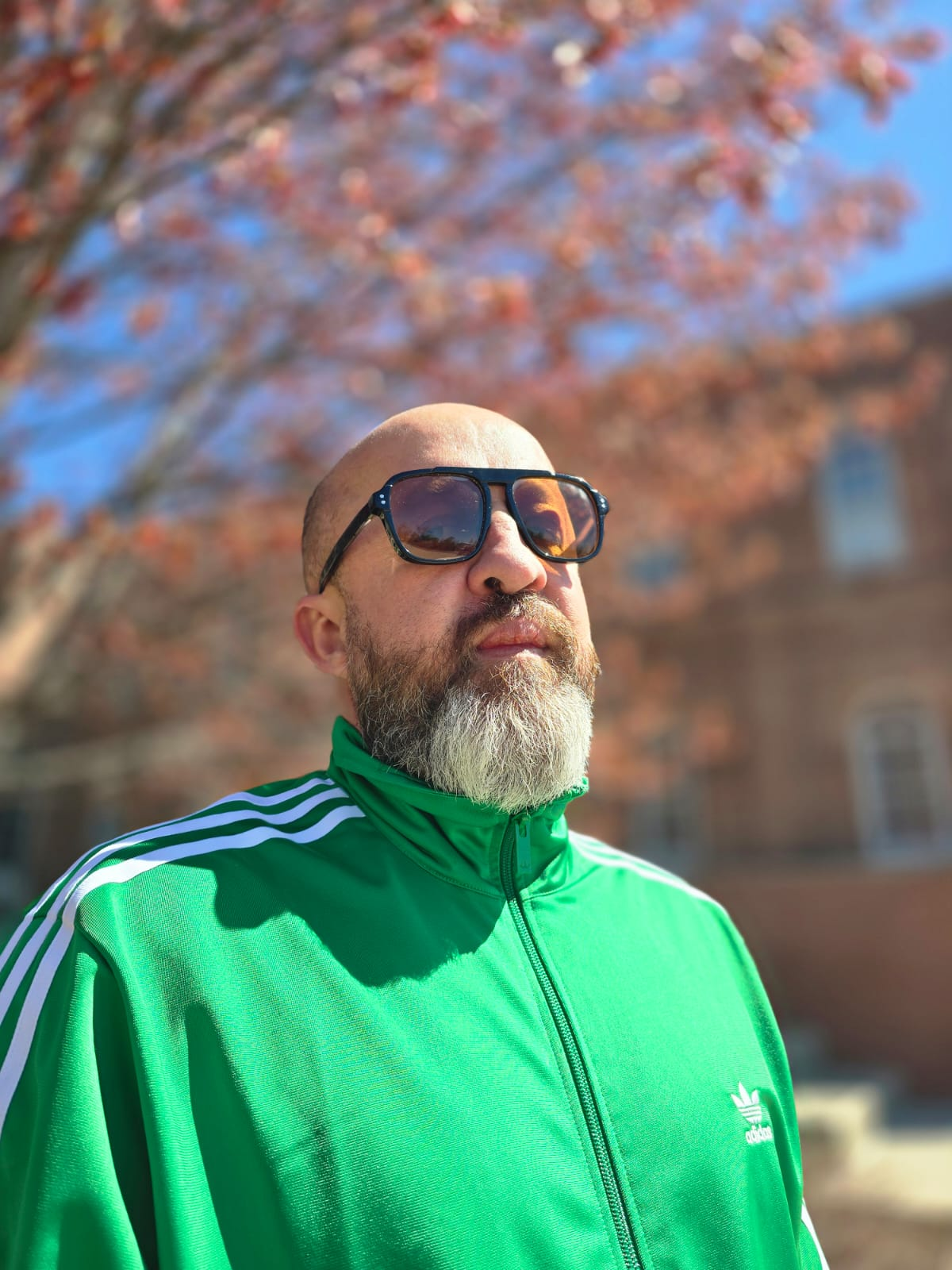

On February 31, 2012, he debuted as host of the TV Gazeta program A Máquina. The show, which aired until 2016, was weekly and featured unusual and creative questions. Guests included writer Valter Hugo Mãe, actress Luana Piovani, singer Chico César, cartoonist Laerte, and composer Tom Zé.

From 2013 to 2020, he was a commentator on TV Globo’s Encontro com Fátima Bernardes, one of Brazil’s most famous TV shows.

Currently, he writes daily for Zero Hora and weekly for the Minas Gerais newspaper O Tempo. He has also been a columnist for O Globo and UOL.

On the radio, he works as a commentator for Rádio Gaúcha on the programs Gaúcha Hoje and SuperSábado. Between 2017 and 2018, he hosted the program Palavra Livre on Rádio Itatiaia.

== Theater ==
Carpinejar adapted his 2012 book Ai Meu Deus, Ai Meu Jesus - Crônicas de Amor e Sexo for the stage. The play Love Forgives Everything, Even Marriage, starring Alexandra Richter, Mouhamed Harfouch, and Marcelo Aquino, premiered on May 6, 2016, at Teatro Leblon in Rio de Janeiro. In the same year, he debuted with the stand-up show O Amor Não é Para os Fracos (Love Is Not for the Weak).

In 2018, once again as writer and director, he performed alongside his father, Carlos Nejar, in the play Poetry from Father to Son.

In 2023, he returned to the stage with the monologue Tudo que seu marido precisa saber (Everything Your Husband Needs to Know). Carpinejar shared 12 autobiographical and fictional stories exploring fundamental aspects of marriage beyond romanticism. The play toured São Paulo, Rio de Janeiro, Porto Alegre, Belo Horizonte, Curitiba, Vitória, and Recife.

Several of his books have been adapted by other Brazilian artists. Filhote de Cruz Credo! (2006) was staged by theater companies in Rio de Janeiro, São Paulo, and Porto Alegre. Cuide dos Pais Antes que Seja Tarde (Take Care of Your Parents Before It’s Too Late) was adapted into a monologue, premiering in 2024.

== Social Media ==
He was chosen by Época magazine as one of the 27 most influential Brazilian personalities on the internet. He has also been voted the most influential social media personality in Rio Grande do Sul and received the Top of Mind award by Amanhã magazine.

== Personal life ==
He was born in Caxias do Sul, the son of poets Maria Carpi and Carlos Nejar. After his parents’ separation in 1981, he continued living with his mother in Porto Alegre, the city where he grew up.

In 1990, he enrolled in journalism at the Federal University of Rio Grande do Sul, graduating in 1995. At the same institution, he earned a master’s degree in Brazilian Literature in 2001. He is a professor in the postgraduate program at PUC-RS.

He lives in both Belo Horizonte and Porto Alegre.

== Bibliography ==
- 1998 - As solas do sol
- 2000 - Um terno de pássaros ao sul
- 2001 - Terceira sede
- 2002 - Biografia de uma árvore
- 2003 - Caixa de sapatos (antologia)
- 2004 - Cinco Marias
- 2004 - Porto Alegre e o dia em que a cidade fugiu de casa
- 2005 - Como no céu/Livro de visitas
- 2006 - O Amor Esquece de Começar
- 2006 - Filhote de Cruz Credo
- 2006 - Meu filho, minha filha.
- 2008 - Diário de um apaixonado - Sintomas de um bem incurável
- 2008 - Canalha! (crônicas)
- 2009 - www.twitter.com/carpinejar
- 2010 - Mulher perdigueira
- 2010 - O menino grisalho
- 2011 - Borralheiro - Minha viagem pela casa
- 2011 - A menina superdotada
- 2012 - Beleza Interior - Uma viagem poética pelo Rio Grande do Sul
- 2012 - Ai meu Deus, Ai meu Jesus: Crônicas de amor e sexo
- 2012 - Bem-vindo - Histórias com as cidades de nomes mais bonitos e misteriosos do Brasil
- 2013 - Espero alguém
- 2014 - Me ajude a chorar
- 2014 - Curinga
- 2015 - Para onde vai o amor?
- 2015 - Todas as mulheres
- 2016 - Amor à Moda Antiga
- 2016 - Felicidade Incurável
- 2017 - Amizade é também amor
- 2017 - Liberdade na vida é ter um amor para se prender
- 2018 - Cuide Dos Pais Antes Que Seja Tarde
- 2019 - Minha Esposa Tem a Senha do Meu Celular
- 2019 - Família é Tudo
- 2020 - Colo, por favor! - Reflexões em tempos de isolamento
- 2021 - Coragem de viver
- 2021 - Depois é nunca
- 2023 - Manual do Luto
- 2024 - Se eu soubesse: Para maiores de 40 anos
- 2025 - Deixe Ir
