= FACA =

FACA may refer to:

- Federación Anarco-Comunista de Argentina, a platformist anarchist political organisation in Argentina
- Federal Advisory Committee Act, a United States statute
- Federation of Anglican Churches in the Americas
- Military of the Central African Republic, les Forces armées centrafricaines
- Fiji Cycling Association
- Facatativa, Colombia. A city and municipality in the Cundinamarca Department in Colombia, South America
- Foro Argentino contra el Antisemitismo, an Argentine organization against antisemitism
