= A Casa Assassinada =

1971 Brazilian drama film

- Directed by: Paulo César Saraceni
- Written by: Paulo César Saraceni
- Based on: Chronicle of the Murdered House by Lúcio Cardoso
- Produced by: Mário Carneiro; Paulo César Saraceni; Sergio Saraceni
- Starring: Rubens Araújo; Norma Bengell; Carlos Kroeber
- Cinematography: Mário Carneiro
- Edited by: Mário Carneiro
- Music by: Antonio Carlos Jobim
- Production company: Planiscope Filmes
- Release date: February 21, 1971
- Running time: 103 minutes
- Country: Brazil
- Language: Portuguese

A Casa Assassinada (English: The Murdered House) is a 1971 Brazilian drama film directed by Paulo Cesar Saraceni, based on Lúcio Cardoso's book Chronicle of the Murdered House.

== Cast ==
- Norma Bengell.... Nina
- Carlos Kroeber.... Timóteo
- Nelson Dantas
- Leina Krespi
- Tetê Medina
- Augusto Rodrigues Lourenço
- Nuno Veloso
- Rubens de Araújo ...Valdo
- Joseph Guerreiro

== Awards ==
1971: Festival de Brasília

1. Best Film (won)
2. Best Director (Paulo César Saraceni) (won)
3. Best Actor (Carlos Kroeber) (won)
4. Best Editing (Mário Carneiro) (won)
5. Best Music (Antonio Carlos Jobim) (won)

1973: Gramado Film Festival

1. Best Actor (Carlos Kroeber) (won)
2. Best Music (Antonio Carlos Jobim) (won)
3. Best Picture (Nominee)

1973: São Paulo Association of Art Critics Awards

1. Best Actor (Carlos Kroeber) (won)
2. Best Actress (Norma Bengell) (won)
3. Best Supporting Actress (Tetê Medina) (won)
4. Best Director (Paulo César Saraceni) (won)
5. Best Cinematography (Mário Carneiro) (won)
