= Crônica da casa assassinada =

Novel by Lúcio Cardoso

Crônica da casa assassinada [Chronicle of the Murdered House] (1959) is an epistolary novel by Brazilian writer Lúcio Cardoso (1913–1968), adapted into the film A casa assassinada [The Murdered House] (1971), directed by Paulo César Saraceni.

== Synopsis ==
The story is told through letters, diary pages, and memories, and reveals elements of jealousy, grudges and taboo themes. It takes place in an old farm in the interior of Minas Gerais, which is visited by a woman. The story focuses on the decay of the Meneses family and depicts themes such as extramarital affairs, forbidden love, incestuous relationships, kinship, homosexuality, and violent acts.

A decaying farmhouse in a provincial town in Minas Gerais is at the core of the action and becomes a major character. The plot is punctuated by sin, death and illness, and it shows the result of the presence of three brothers (Demétrio, Valdo and Timóteo) and two wives (Ana and Nina). Nina is a stunningly beautiful woman who comes from Rio de Janeiro and is unable to adapt to rural, peasant life. She marries Valdo for his wealth, but soon discovers the decay of the Meneses family. As one of the main protagonists of the work, she is a destructive element of the family order and causes envy and disaffection in the family circle. She has an adulterous affair with Alberto, one of the servants who witness the events. From their relationship, André is born. André opens the book in a cyclic key: He is the character who retells Nina's death, so the story starts from the end of the chronology. The novel's plot and form are organized around the incest between mother and child, leaving the fictional truth open for the reader to unveil.

== Evaluation ==
Crônica da casa assassinada is the best-known work by Brazilian novelist, poet and playwright Lúcio Cardoso. According to researcher Mario Carelli (1951–1994), Cardoso's “human and artistic path” comes together in this novel. It is considered the culmination of the writer's trajectory started in 1934 with Maleita, which is in tune with the dominant regionalist trend of the time. The novel leads to the psychological-existential path of Luz no Subsolo (1936), characterized by Carelli as a “passionate sketch”. This can also be seen in texts like the novel Mãos Vazias [Empty Hands] (1938), Inácio (1944), and O Enfeitiçado [Bewitched] (1954).

Critic Alfredo Bosi points out that the novel's theme is linked to religious and spiritualist issues, immersed in the formal freedom conquered by the vanguards in a “descent into the hell of anguish and guilt.” However, a difficulty persists in characterizing it in one of the currents of the Brazilian novel. The complex combination of literary characteristics does not allow reducing it to the idea of an “introspective novel” or to the trends developed by the critics mentioned above.

The reader is faced with the narrative unfolded between psychological turbulence and the portrait of a decaying social order. Or between the production of “spectral portraits of being”, as suggested by the poet Carlos Drummond de Andrade in a tribute poem to Cardoso ("A Lúcio Cardoso, na casa de saúde" [To Lúcio Cardoso, in a sanatorium]), and the exhibition of the “moral metastasis of the Meneses farm”, in the words of the critic Eduardo Portella.

The novel is also considered a transition from the modern to the postmodern society, since "the story narrated in the novel is distinguished by the decline of traditional values and by the consequent rise of anarchic proposals that justify the nihilism of contemporary society." In a non-linear way, the novel describes the decadence and fragmentation of a traditional bourgeois Brazilian family in a multilayered narrative which includes the voices of members of the Meneses family and of the inhabitants of Vila Velha, the town where they live.

== See also ==
- A casa assassinada (film)
