= Farhat Abdraimov =

Kazakh actor (1966–2021)

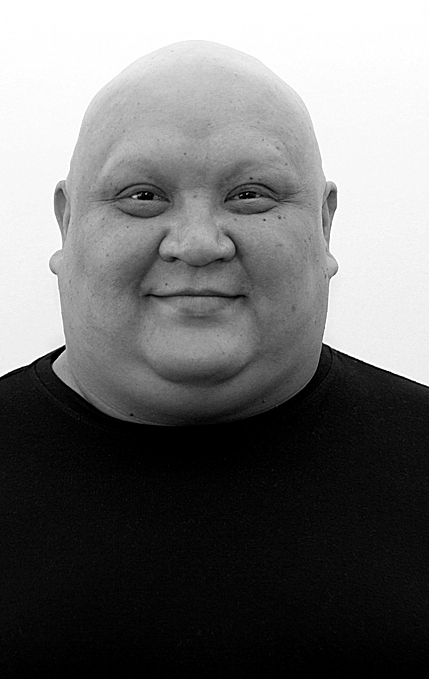
- Abdraimov in 2009
- Born: 21 January 1966; Almaty, Kazakh SSR, Soviet Union
- Died: 21 May 2021 (aged 55); Tbilisi, Georgia
- Occupation: Actor

Farhat Nursultanuly Abdraimov (Kazakh: Фархат Нұрсұлтанұлы Әбдірайымов, romanized: Farhat Nūrsūltanūly Äbdıraiymov; 21 January 1966 – 21 May 2021) was a Kazakh actor.

== Biography ==
Abdraimov was born to Nursultan Abdraimov, a Kazakh man and Ushuhan Mamedova, an Uyghur woman in Almaty, Kazakh Soviet Socialist Republic, on 21 January 1966. He died in Tbilisi, Georgia, on 21 May 2021 from a heart attack during filming.

== Selected filmography ==
- 1996 — Whoever Softer
- 1996 — Shanghai
- 1998 — Fara
- 2010 — Tale of Pink Hare
- 2011 — Returning to the 'A'

== Awards ==
- 1996 — Russian Film Award Best Actor in 1996 in Moscow (together with Sergei Bodrov Jr.)
- 1999 — Prize Silver St. George for Best Actor in the film Farah 21st Moscow International Film Festival
- 2003 — Diploma of the President of the Republic of Kazakhstan
- 2014 — Order of Kurmet
- 2016 — Medal of 25 years of independence of the Republic of Kazakhstan
