= Mario Vieira de Mello =

Brazilian intellectual

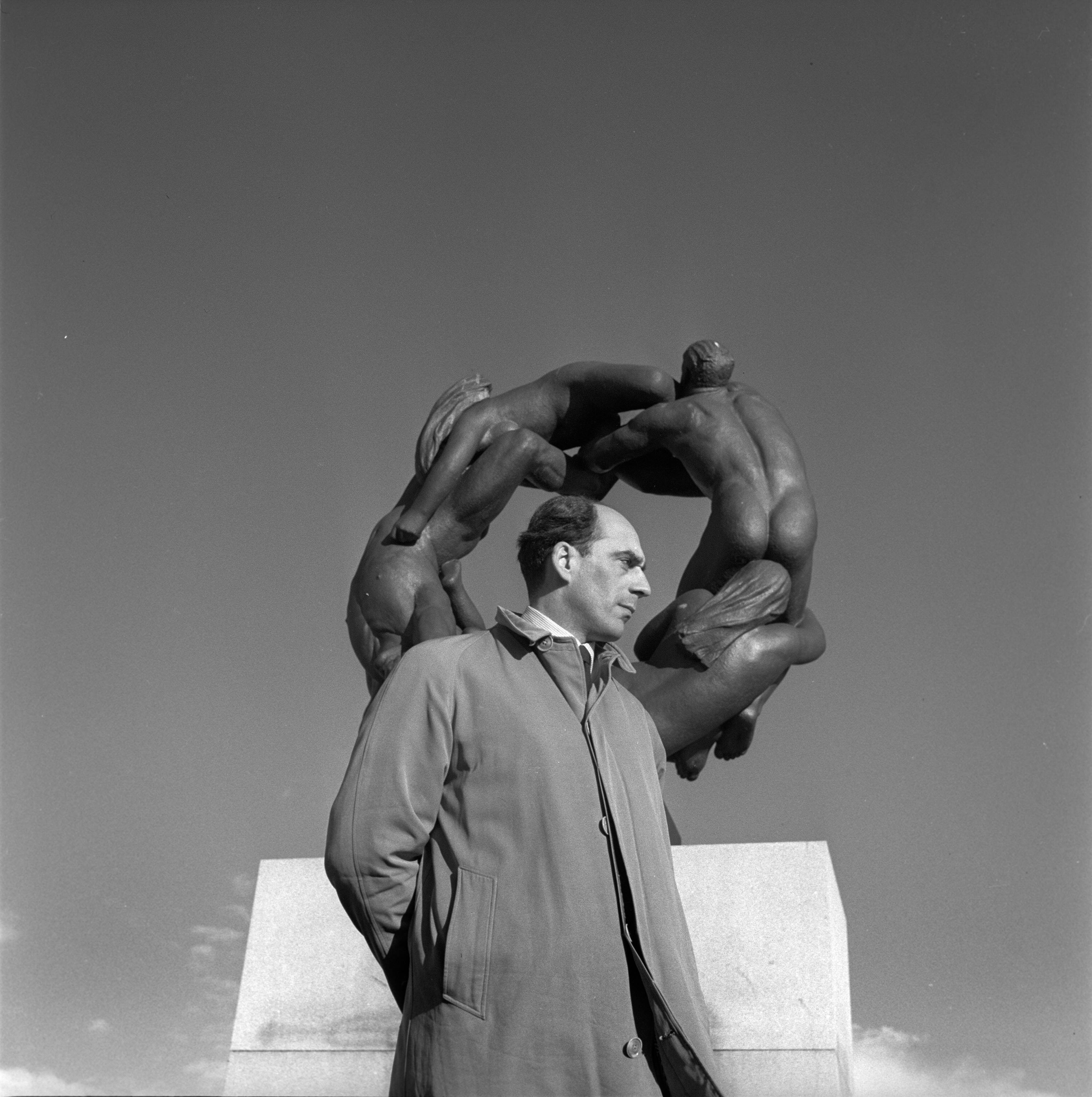
In Oslo.

Mario Vieira de Mello (May 26, 1912 – March 30, 2006) was a Brazilian intellectual and diplomat. He is best known for his writings on philosophy, education, Brazilian culture, and political thought. He served as ambassador to Hungary, Guatemala, and Ghana.

== Biography ==
Born in Newcastle upon Tyne, Mello was the son of diplomat Américo Vieira de Mello. He graduated from the National Faculty of Law, where he became acquainted with the poet Vinicius de Moraes and the novelist Octavio de Faria, before joining the Brazilian diplomatic service. In 1939, he was appointed Third Secretary by Getúlio Vargas, and three years later he served as an auxiliary at the Third Meeting of the Foreign Ministers of the American Republics.

From 1962 to 1966, he served at the Brazilian diplomatic mission to UNESCO in Paris. In March 1968, he was appointed ambassador to Ghana by President Emílio Garrastazu Médici. Two years later, he was transferred to Guatemala, and in 1974 he was promoted to Minister of First Class and appointed ambassador to Hungary. He retired from diplomatic service in 1977.

== Thought ==
Mello elaborated on the problem of estetismo, a tradition he traces back to the Renaissance, and which he argues is at the root of modern intellectual phenomena, such as rationalism and romanticism. According to him, this tendency manifests itself in Brazilian culture and social psychology through superficial concerns over the internal pursuit of truth and conscience.

Mello explored the relations between democracy and education in the books O Conceito para uma Educação de Cultura no Brasil and O Cidadão. He distinguishes between egalitarian and ethical democracy, the former imposed by political power and the latter developed through culture. Defending the revival of the Greek paideia, he proposes education as a means of cultivating moral autonomy, which would set conditions for ethical democracy.

== Works ==
- Desenvolvimento e Cultura: O problema do estetismo no Brasil (1963)
- O Conceito para uma Educação de Cultura no Brasil (1986)
- Nietzsche - O Sócrates de nossos tempos (1993)
- O Cidadão (1994)
- O Humanista (1996)
- O Homem Curioso (2001)
