= Aristarkh Livanov =

Soviet and Russian actor

- Аристарх Ливанов
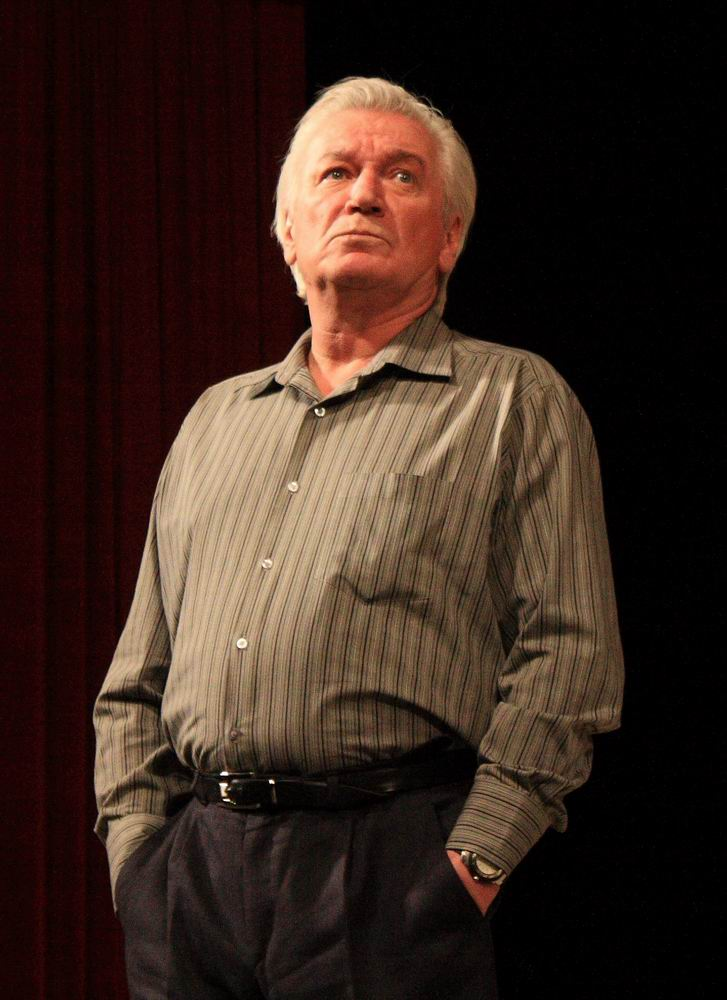
- Born: Aristarkh Yevgenyevich Livanov; 17 March 1947 (age 79); Kyiv, Ukrainian SSR
- Citizenship: Soviet Union; Russian
- Occupation: Actor
- Years active: 1969 — present
- Spouse: Larisa Livanova
- Awards: (2009)

Aristarkh Yevgenyevich Livanov (Russian: Ариста́рх Евге́ньевич Лива́нов; born 1947) is a Soviet and Russian theater actor. People's Artist of Russia (1999). The older brother of actor Igor Livanov.

== Biography ==
Aristarkh livanov was born on 17 March 1947 in Kyiv. The boy was named after his grandfather, who, as an Orthodox priest, was shot in 1938. His mother, Nina Timofeevna Livanova and his father, Yevgeni Aristarkhovich Livanov, were leaders of the puppet theater circle in the House of the pioneers of the Oktyabrsky district of Kyiv. In 1969 he graduated from LGITMiK (Leningrad State Institute of Theatre, Music and Cinematography, now Russian State Institute of Performing Arts, or ECWG), was assigned the Volgograd Theatre for Young People, worked for some time there, then in the Volgograd Drama Theater and in theaters of Rostov on-Don and Taganrog Theatre.

Film debut of a young Livanov was held in the same 1969. He played bones in youth film These Innocent Fun on the novel by Anatoly Rybakov Vacation Сrumble. A little later, in 1970. Aristarkh Livanov starred in the adventure film Green Chain.

In 1977 Aristarkh Livanov moved to Moscow and was admitted to the Mossovet Theatre.

This success came to Livanov in 1980 after starring of Serge Alekseev white officer in the adventure film State Border. This work has brought fame to the actor and cemented him aristocrat roles, intolerant belonging to the lower classes.

In subsequent years, Aristarch Livanov lot of filming, and very often he'd ever play the role of the White Guards, or foreigners.

The theatrical life changes also occurred. In 1986 Livanov left the Mossovet and moved to the Russian Army Theatre, but did not stay there long, and in 1987 became an actor Gorky Moscow Art Theater.

In the 90 years Livanov continued to actively removed. One of the prominent role of the time — the captain of the Ravens in the blockbuster Thirtieth Destroy, where the actor played with his brother Igor Livanov. At that time, Livanov often getting any negative roles — the pimps and the mafia. In the 2000s to Livanov came a new round of popularity. In 2002, in the film Letters to Elsa, the first time he played a tycoon. Later he often offered the role of the oligarchs and the FSB generals.

Actively continues to act in television series.

== Filmography ==
- TASS Is Authorized to Declare... (1984) — Welsh's assistant
- Sofia Kovalevskaya (1985)
- Fouetté (1986) — Knyazev
- Frenzied Bus (1990) — Viktor
- The Executioner (1990) — Sergei Gavrilov
- Prison Romance (1993) — Aristarkh Livanov
- Whoever Softer (1996) — Baigali
- The Romanovs: An Imperial Family (2000) — Pavel Milyukov
- Wolf (2020) — Ivan Sukhikh
