= The Dance (1998 film) =

1998 Icelandic film by Ágúst Guðmundsson

- Directed by: Ágúst Guðmundsson
- Written by: Kristín Atladóttir; Ágúst Guðmundsson; William Heinesen (short story)
- Produced by: Ágúst Guðmundsson
- Starring: Gunnar Helgason; Baldur Trausti Hreinsson
- Cinematography: Ernest Vincze
- Release date: 23 September 1998
- Running time: 83 minutes
- Country: Iceland
- Language: Icelandic

The Dance (Icelandic: Dansinn) is a 1998 Icelandic drama film produced and directed by Ágúst Guðmundsson. It is set in the Faroe Islands and revolves around a wedding which is interrupted when a British fishing trawler is wrecked nearby. The screenplay is based on the short story Her skal danses by William Heinesen from Faroe Islands. It was filmed in the Faroe Islands with an Icelandic cast. It was entered into the 21st Moscow International Film Festival where Guðmundsson won the Silver St. George for Best Director.

== Cast ==
- Gunnar Helgason as Pétur
- Baldur T. Hreinsson as Ívar (as Baldur Trausti Hreinsson)
- Pálína Jónsdóttir as Sirsa
- Dofri Hermannsson as Haraldur
- Gísli Halldórsson as Nikulás
- Kristina Sundar Hansen as Anna Linda
- Saga Jónsdóttir as Salmóma
- Arnar Jónsson as Djákni
- Magnús Ólafsson as Sýslumaður
- Benedikt Erlingsson as Hólófernes

== Production ==
Kristín Atladóttir and Ágúst Guðmundsson wrote the script after William Heinesen's short story "Her skal danses". Ísfilm produced the film in collaboration with Oxford Film Company, Nordisk Film and Hamburger Kino Kompanie. The film was shot in the Faroe Islands with Icelandic actors.

== Release ==
The film was screened at the 1998 Toronto International Film Festival, Festroia International Film Festival, the 21st Moscow International Film Festival and several other festivals. It was released in Icelandic cinemas on 23 September 1998.

=== Critical response ===
Guðmundur Ásgeirsson of Morgunblaðið described The Dance as "without a doubt one of the better films that have been made in this country" and compared it to the Danish film Babette's Feast. He found the dialogues to be of uneven quality while the fragmented narrative gave a lightness to the film. The critic wrote: "The Dance is the best Icelandic film of the last year and raises hopes of a brighter future for the industry."

Variety's Leonard Klady wrote:

Helmer's graceful, precise style contrasts sharply with the howling winds and fierce rains that pummel the characters. Tech credits are richly hued and amplified by a haunting score that incorporates traditional folk music. The cast is vividly drawn, down to the tiniest part.

=== Accolades ===
The film won the prize for Best Cinematography at Festroia and Best Director at the Moscow International Film Festival.

At the 1999 Edda Awards, Þórunn María Jónsdóttir received the prize for Best Costumes. The film was also nominated for Best Film, Director and Actor (Dofri Hermannsson). It was nominated for the Norwegian Amanda Award the same year for Best Nordic Film.
