= Argentine Forum Against Antisemitism =

Argentine NGO (founded 2023)

The Argentine Forum Against Antisemitism (Spanish: Foro Argentino contra el Antisemitismo (FACA)) is an Argentine non-governmental organization established on November 7, 2023, one month after the October 7 attacks. FACA's stated mission is to combat antisemitism and support Israel's right to exist.

The organization consists of over 100 members, including journalists, philosophers, writers, politicians, cultural figures, and civil society leaders from diverse backgrounds and ideologies. Notable members include Laura Alonso, Federico Andahazi, Osvaldo Bazán, Daniel Burman, Diana Cohen Agrest, Federico D'Elía, José Luis Espert, Eduardo Feinmann, Mariel Fitz Patrick, Ignacio Goano, Willy Kohan, Santiago Kovadloff, Jorge Lanata, Alfredo Leuco, Fanny Mandelbaum, Romina Manguel, Pablo Maurette, Pablo Novak, Luis Novaresio, David Rotemberg, Alejo Schapire, Diana Sperling, Margarita Stolbizer, Jonatan Viale and Miguel Wiñazki.

The Organizing Committee is composed of Sabrina Ajmechet, Facundo Landívar, Nicolás Lucca, Romina Markdorf, Alejandro Mellincovsky, Diego Papic, Valeria Shapira, Víctor Tevah and Elisa Trotta Gamus.

In a statement, FACA's organizers described the organization as emerging from “the concern felt after the October 7, 2023 attack, which marked the most severe mass killing of Jews since the Holocaust. This event impacted not only Israel and Jewish communities globally but also those who value Western principles, individual life, freedom, plurality, and democracy."

Among its initiatives, FACA has launched a campaign addressing antisemitism at construction sites within the Buenos Aires Metropolitan Area in partnership with urban developers, organized a talk with former hostages of Hamas, Clara Marman and Luis Har, created a campaign addressing antisemitism in soccer, and conducted an urban intervention on International Women's Day to raise awareness about reported sexual abuses by Hamas on October 7.
