= Việt Linh =

Vietnamese film director

Việt Linh (b. Nguyễn Việt Linh in Saigon, French Indochina, 1952) is a Vietnamese film director. She lives and works in Paris, France.

She started working in cinema at the beginning of 1971. Between 1980 and 1985, she studied at the VGIK in the former Soviet Union, graduating in 1985. She then began working for Vietnam's state-owned Giải Phóng Film Studio in Ho Chi Minh City. She has completed seven feature films since 1986 and is currently involved in editing books about cinema for Vietnamese readers. Her 1999 film, The Building, was entered into the 21st Moscow International Film Festival.

== Filmography ==
- Nơi bình yên chim hót (1986)
- Phiên tòa cần chánh án (1987)
- Gánh xiếc rong (1988)
- Dấu ấn của quỷ (1992)
- Chung cư (1999)
- Mê Thảo, Thời Vang Bóng (The Glorious Time in Me Thao Hamlet, 2002)
