= Ágúst Guðmundsson =

Icelandic film director and screenwriter (born 1947)

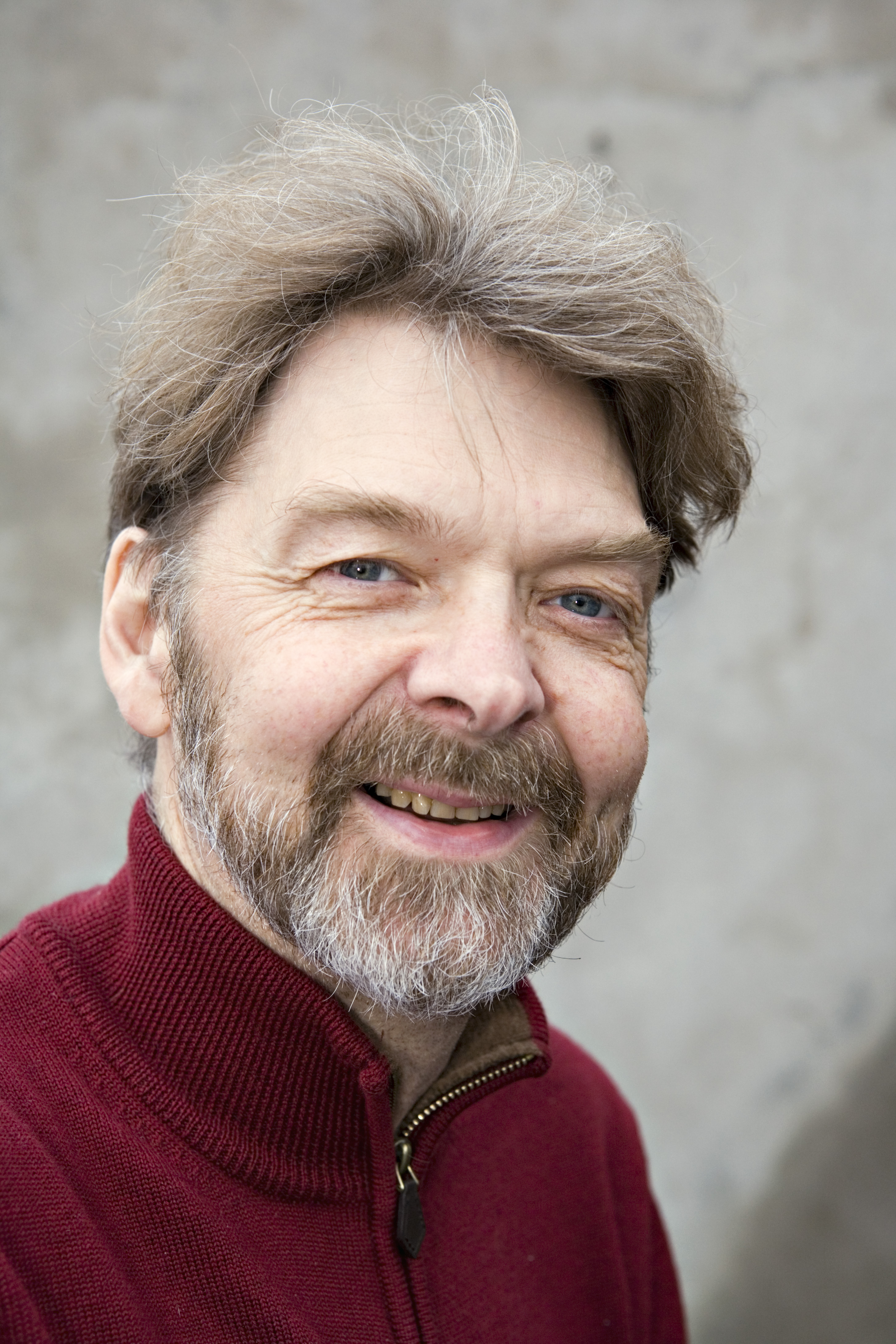
- Born: 29 June 1947 (age 78); Reykjavík, Iceland
- Occupations: Film director; screenwriter
- Years active: 1974–present
- Awards: Edda Award for Best Director

Ágúst Guðmundsson (born 29 June 1947) is an Icelandic film director and screenwriter.

He studied French and Icelandic in Reykjavík and filmmaking at the National Film School in London. He has made many popular Icelandic films that have also been translated into other languages. His 1998 film The Dance was entered into the 21st Moscow International Film Festival where he won the Silver St. George for Best Director.

He was director of BÍL, The Federation of Icelandic Artists, from 2006–2010. In 2025, the Icelandic Parliament awarded him its honorary lifetime artist pension (Heiðurslaun listamanna).

== Films ==
- Land and Sons (Land og synir, 1980)
- Outlaw: The Saga of Gisli (Útlaginn, 1981)
- On Top (Með allt á hreinu, 1982)
- Golden Sands (Gullsandur, 1984)
- Nonni und Manni (TV series, 6 episodes, 1988-1989)
- The Dance (Dansinn, 1998)
- The Seagull's Laughter (Mávahlátur, 2001)
- Ahead of Time (Í takt við tímann, 2004)
- Spooks and Spirits (Ófeigur gengur aftur, 2013)
