= Fara (film) =

1999 film

- Film poster
- Directed by: Abay Karpykov
- Written by: Boris Airapetyan; Leila Akhinzhanova
- Produced by: Boris Airapetyan
- Starring: Farhat Abdraimov
- Cinematography: Aleksei Berkovich
- Music by: Boris Airapetyan
- Production company: Kazakhfilm
- Release date: 1 July 1999
- Running time: 89 minutes
- Countries: Russia; Kazakhstan
- Language: Russian

Fara (Russian: Фара) is a 1999 Russian thriller drama film directed by Abay Karpykov. It was entered into the 21st Moscow International Film Festival where Farhat Abdraimov won the Silver St. George for Best Actor.

== Plot ==
Fara is a good-natured fat man, the son of the murdered bank director. As a child, the boy was disabled, and only his sole friend Bob at the cost of his life helped to get the boy to his feet. Fara's father left him a legacy of millions on a secret account. Mafia's goal becomes to learn the code to it. Then a strange woman appears with a sick child whose life supposedly can only be saved by means of an immediate and very expensive operation.

== Cast ==
- Farhat Abdraimov as Fara
- Christina Orbakaite as stranger
- Aleksandr Aleksandrov
- Dauren Sarsekeyev
- Peter Zhmutski as hippie
- Maurizio Aschero as banker
