= Sofia Kovalevskaya (film) =

- Written by: Boris Dobrodeyev
- Directed by: Ayan Shakhmaliyeva
- Starring: Elena Safonova; Aristarkh Livanov; Algimantas Masyulis; Lembit Ulfsak; Elena Solovey; Aleksandr Filippenko
- Music by: Isaak Shvarts
- Country of origin: Soviet Union
- Original language: Russian

Production
- Cinematography: Sergei Yurizditsky
- Running time: 220 minutes

Original release
- Release: April 1985

Sofya Kovalevskaya (Russian: Софья Ковалевская) is a 1985 biographical television miniseries, directed by Ayan Shakhmaliyeva and starring Elena Safonova.

== Synopsis ==
Epic film in three episodes, based on a true story of mathematician scientist Sofia Kovalevskaya. She was a Russian pioneer for women in Tzarist Russia. She was the first woman in the country to become a Member of the Russian Academy of Sciences. It seemed that the whole world was against her accomplishing this feat. In spite of all the obstacles she later got a Ph.D. in mathematics. However, as no Russian University would accept a woman, she had to emigrate to Western Europe for continuation of her career and studies. She had a daughter and family life. Sofya Kovalevskaya was eventually recognized in Russia. Leading scientists, like Academician Ivan Sechenov, took part in her education and career.

== Production ==
Film was produced by Gosteleradio state production company of the Soviet Union with the production crew of Ekran Studios, Moscow. Filming dates were in 1984 and 1985. Post-production was completed by Ekran studios, and at postproduction facilities of Lenfilm studios in St. Petersburg in the spring of 1985.

== Filming locations ==
Most scenes were filmed in St. Peterburg, Russia, where Sofia Kovalevskaya started her career in science. Some scenes of Western European cities were filmed in Baltic states. Scenes of Sofia Kovalevskaya as a student were filmed at St. Petersburg University.

== Main cast ==
- Elena Safonova as Sofya Kovalevskaya
- Aristarkh Livanov
- Natalya Sayko
- Algimantas Masyulis
- Lembit Ulfsak
- Aleksandr Filippenko as Dostoyevsky
- Yelena Arzhanik
- Yelena Solovey
- Yury Solomin
- Petr Shelokhonov as Academician Ivan Sechenov
- Vladimir Letenkov
- Stanislav Landgraf
- Vaiva Mainelyte
- Yelena Arzhanik
- Nikolai Kryukov

== Comments and connections ==
- This was the first leading role for actress Elena Safonova before she became an international film star.
- Premiered on the National TV of the Soviet Union in April 1985.

== See also ==
- A Hill on the Dark Side of the Moon — a 1983 Swedish drama film about the life of Sofia Kovalevskaya
- List of films about mathematicians
