= Afonso Cláudio =

Afonso Cláudio may refer to:

- Afonso Cláudio (politician) (1859–1934), Brazilian politician, teacher and poet
- Afonso Cláudio, Espírito Santo, municipality in Brazil named after the politician
