= Spooks and Spirits =

2013 Icelandic film by Ágúst Guðmundsson

- Directed by: Ágúst Guðmundsson
- Written by: Ágúst Guðmundsson
- Produced by: Ágúst Guðmundsson
- Starring: Þórhallur Sigurðsson; Gísli Örn Garðarsson; Ilmur Kristjánsdóttir
- Cinematography: Bergsteinn Bjorgulfsson
- Edited by: Ingi R. Ingason
- Music by: Karl Olgeirsson
- Production companies: Vesturport; Kukl
- Distributed by: Isfilm
- Release date: 27 March 2013 (Iceland)
- Running time: 92 minutes
- Country: Iceland
- Language: Icelandic

Spooks and Spirits (Icelandic: Ófeigur gengur aftur) is a 2013 Icelandic fantasy-comedy film written and directed by Ágúst Guðmundsson.

== Cast ==
- Þórhallur Sigurðsson as Ofeig
- Gísli Örn Garðarsson as Ingi Brjánn
- Ilmur Kristjánsdóttir as Anna Sól
- Ágúst Guðmundsson as Prestur

== Release ==
Spooks and Spirits premiered in Iceland on 27 March 2013. It was screened at various film festivals, such as the 36th Mill Valley Film Festival in 2013.

== Reception ==
At the Edda Awards in 2014, the film was included for three nominations: Jörundur Rafn Arnarson for Special Effects, Birgir Tryggvason og Sindri Þór Kárason for Sound Design of the year and Karl Olgeirsson for Musical Score.
