= The Building (film) =

1999 film

- French-language film poster
- Directed by: Việt Linh
- Written by: Việt Linh
- Produced by: Dương Minh Hoàng
- Starring: Don Duong; Hong Anh; Mai Thanh; Minh Trang
- Music by: Phú Quang
- Production companies: Fonds Sud Cinéma; Giai Phong Film Studio; Agence Intergouvernementale de la Francophonie
- Release date: July 1999 (Moscow)
- Running time: 90 minutes
- Country: Vietnam
- Language: Vietnamese

The Building (Vietnamese: Chung cu) is a 1999 Vietnamese drama film directed by Việt Linh. It was entered into the 21st Moscow International Film Festival.

== Cast ==
- Don Duong
- Hong Anh
- Mai Thanh
- Minh Trang
