= Tale of Pink Hare =

- Film poster
- Kazakh: Қызғылт қоян туралы ертегі
- Russian: Сказ о розовом зайце
- Directed by: Farhat Sharipov
- Written by: Farhat Sharipov
- Produced by: Yermek Amashayev
- Starring: Anuar Nurpeisov; Maksim Akbarov; Karlygash Mukhamedzhanova; Farhat Abdraimov; Sanzhar Madiyev; Bakhtiyar Kozha
- Cinematography: Alexander Plotnikov
- Edited by: Sergey Vilkovisky
- Production company: Kazakhfilm
- Release date: December 12, 2010
- Running time: 105 minutes
- Country: Kazakhstan
- Languages: Russian, Kazakh
- Budget: 550000 $

Tale of Pink Hare (Russian: Сказ о розовом зайце, romanized: Skaz o rozovom zaytse; Kazakh: Қызғылт қоян туралы ертегі, romanized: Qyzğylt qoian turaly ertegı) is a 2010 Kazakhstan low budget film directed by Farhat Sharipov.

== Plot ==
Yerlan is a young man from the provinces. He came to Almaty and later met a few students, who were the children of wealthy people. One of them agitated him to the point where he felt he had to adventure.

== Cast ==
- Änwar Nurpeýisov as Yerlan
- Maksim Akbarov as Loko
- Qarlıģash Muhamedjanova as Djeka
- Farhat Abdraimov as Djaýbarxan
- Sanjar Madi as Jan
- Erbolat Toguzakov as Qaýrat
- Baxtiyar Qoja as Yerlan's mother
- Sayat Isembayev as Djonïk
- Murat Bïsembïn as Tïmur

== Awards and nominations ==
- Аward of the Union of Kazakhstan filmmakers to the best director (Farhat Sharipov)
