= Will to Live =

1999 Japanese film

- Theatrical release poster
- Directed by: Kaneto Shindō
- Written by: Kaneto Shindō
- Produced by: Jiro Shindō
- Starring: Rentarō Mikuni; Shinobu Otake
- Cinematography: Yoshiyuki Miyake
- Edited by: Yukio Watanabe
- Music by: Hikaru Hayashi
- Production company: Kindai Eiga Kyokai
- Release date: 15 January 1999 (Japan)
- Running time: 119 minutes
- Country: Japan
- Language: Japanese

Will to Live (Japanese: 生きたい, Hepburn: Ikitai) is a 1999 Japanese comedy drama film directed by Kaneto Shindō starring Rentarō Mikuni and Shinobu Otake.

== Plot ==
Yasukichi visits Mount Kamuriki where, according to the ubasute legend, in the past old people were taken by their children and left to die. Later, he attends a bar run by a woman with whom he had an affair years ago after the death of his wife. He defecates in his clothes and is thrown out by the bar owner. Lying on the pavement, he is run over by a man on a bicycle, who turns out to be a doctor and takes him to the hospital. The doctor rings up Yasukichi's eldest daughter Tokuko, who lives with her father. She is first reluctant to take him home, arguing that she is suffering from bipolar disorder, but eventually gives in. Yasukichi has stolen a book from the hospital about the ubasute custom, (Note: The book is the novel Narayama bushikō by Shichirō Fukazawa.) and begins reading it to Tokuko. The book's story, about 70-year-old widow Okoma making preparations to be taken to Mount Kamuriki by her eldest son, is told in interspersed black-and-white sequences.

Tokuko's sister, who appears rather detached from her father, comes for a visit to pick up unused furniture. Yasukichi is repeatedly hospitalised after defecating himself and passing out in his house and at the bar. During one of his stays, his son shows up to tell him that he is getting married, but that the father's presence at the ceremony is unneeded. Yasukichi eventually gives in to the doctor's advice and Tokuko's urging to be committed to a retirement home. Some time later, Tokuko, feeling alone and guilty for abandoning her father, shows up at the retirement home and carries him out on her back, like the young people who carried their elders up to Mount Kamuriki.

== Cast ==
- Rentarō Mikuni as Yasukichi Yamamoto
- Shinobu Otake as Tokuko Yamamoto
- Akira Emoto as Kimitsuka, the doctor
- Naoko Otani as Bar owner
- Hideko Yoshida as Okoma
- Masayuki Shionoya
- Yoshiko Miyazaki
- Masahiko Tsugawa
- Hideo Kanze

== Awards ==
- Golden St. George and FIPRESCI Prize at the 21st Moscow International Film Festival
