= Fouetté (film) =

- Directed by: Boris Yermolayev; Vladimir Vasiliev
- Written by: Savva Kulish; Boris Yermolayev
- Starring: Ekaterina Maximova; Vladimir Vasiliev; Aristarkh Livanov
- Cinematography: Valery Mironov
- Edited by: Irina Gorokhovskaya
- Music by: Anatoly Balchev; Oleg Karavaychuk
- Production company: Lenfilm
- Release date: 15 October 1986 (USSR)
- Running time: 100 min.
- Country: Soviet Union
- Language: Russian

Fouetté (Russian: Фуэте) is a musical feature film in the genre of drama of Russian film director Boris Yermolayev and director-choreographer Vladimir Vasiliev, released in 1986.

== Plot ==
Prima-ballerina Elena Knyazeva prepares for her performance on the anniversary jubilee for the theater Swan Lake on the eve of her fiftieth birthday and simultaneously participates in the production of the innovative ballet Master and Margarita. Suddenly, the choreographer gives the role of a young ballerina, with whom he begins an affair. Overcoming jealousy and desperation, Knyazeva begins to work with the student over the image of Margarita.

In the film are Valentin Gaft's poems.

== Cast ==
- Ekaterina Maximova as Elena Knyazeva
- Vladimir Vasiliev as Andrey Novikov
- Aristarkh Livanov as Knyazev
- Valentin Gaft as Poet
- Yevgeny Kolobov as conductor

== Criticism ==
The beautiful Balgolf ballet has never been shown with such force and truth as in this film. The pains of labor and creativity are enormous, almost intolerable, deadly. But the same Spessivtseva once wrote in her diary: You will not die from dancing, you will leave them — and nothing will happen, and you're nobody's, and from you, and to you. This sensation permeates the film, all the fates in it.

There is one more tragic feeling: the inevitability of leaving, the end, the thought of how to find a way out in this care.

(Boris Lyvov-Anokhin, People's Artist of the RSFSR).
