= Academia Espírito-santense de Letras =

Literary society in Brazil

Coordinates: 20°19′15″S 40°20′22″W

- Academia Espírito-santense de Letras
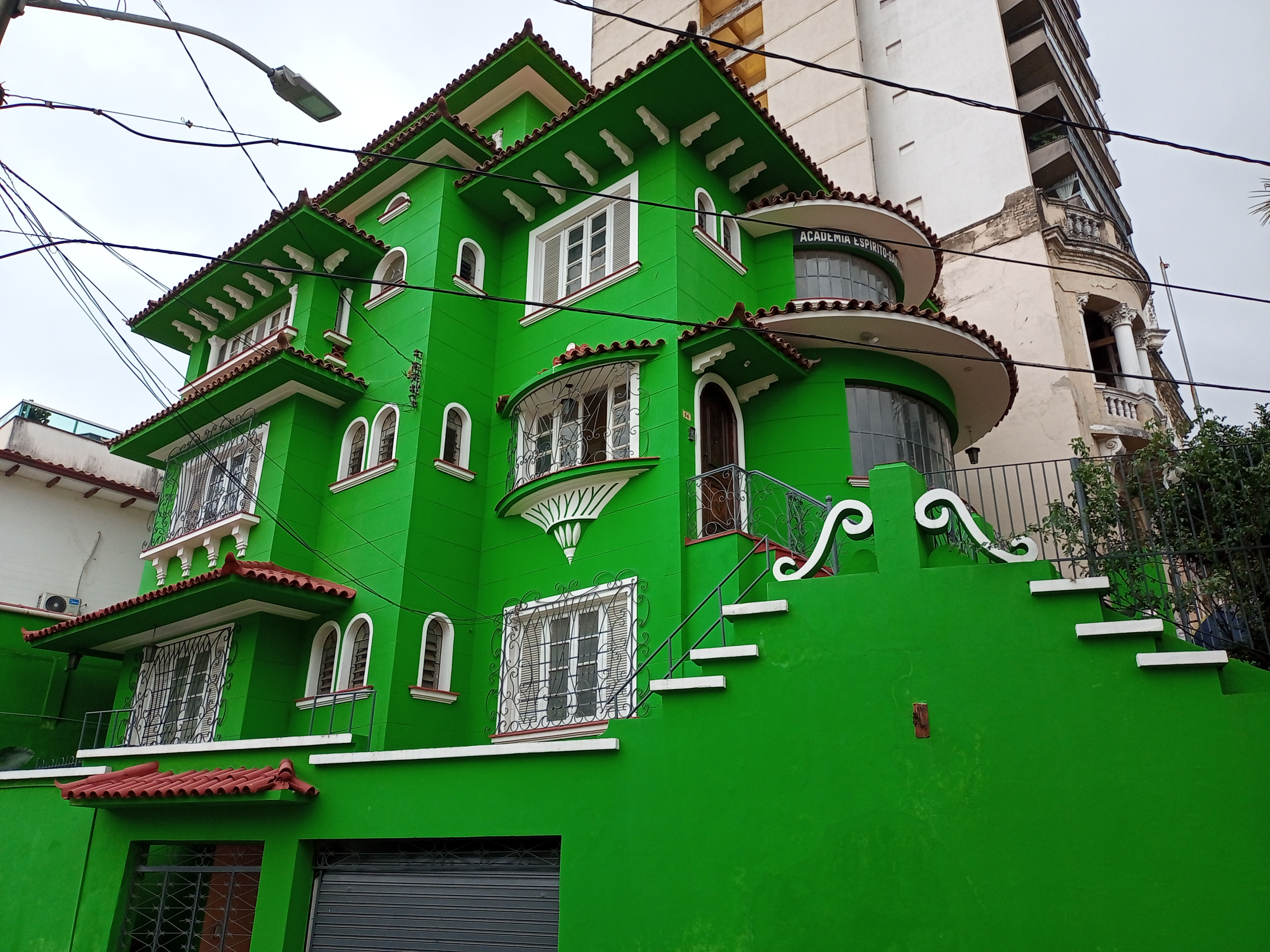
- The Academy in 2022
- Established: 1921; 105 years ago
- Purpose: Literary society
- Headquarters: Vitória, Espírito Santo Brazil
- Region served: Espírito Santo
- Official language: Portuguese
- Leader: Ester Abreu Vieira de Oliveira
- Website: ael.org.br

The Academia Espírito-santense de Letras (Portuguese for "Espírito Santo Literary Academy", acronym AEL) is a Brazilian literary society headquartered in Vitória, Espírito Santo.

== History ==
The academy was established in 1921 by Afonso Cláudio de Freitas Rosa, Alarico de Freitas, Sezefredo Garcia de Rezende, Aristeu Borges de Aguiar and other notable personalities. The academy aims to encourage culture, promote the creation of cultural associations, publicise and encourage reading and the creation of libraries, promote literary competitions, maintain exchanges with other associations, take part in projects aimed at cultural integration and carry out research with a view to the literary development of the State of Espírito Santo. Among the personalities who have been part of the academy are jurists, professors and journalists, as well as politicians, military personnel, religious people, civil servants, businesspeople and liberal professionals, all interested in culture and literature, such as Jerônimo Monteiro, João Clímaco, Graciano Neves and Aristóbulo Barbosa Leão.

== Current members ==
As of June 2024, the current members are:

- Bernadete Lyra
- Jorge Elias Neto
- Osvaldo Ovídio dos Santos
- Francisco Grijó
- Samuel Machado Duarte
- Francisco Aurélio Ribeiro
- Renata Bomfim
- João Baptista Herkenhoff
- Romulo Felippe
- Jonas Reis
- Evandro Moreira
- Gabriel Augusto de Mello Bittencourt
- Adilson Vilaça de Freitas
- Álvaro José dos Santos Silva
- Marcos Tavares
- Carlos Nejar
- Fernando Achiamé
- José Carlos Mattedi
- Neida Lúcia Moraes
- Humberto Del Maestro
- Oscar Gama
- Leonardo Passos Monjardim
- Maria das Graças Silva Neves
- Luiz Busatto
- Pedro J. Nunes
- José Roberto Santos Neves
- Ester Abreu
- Sérgio Bizzoto Pessoa de Mendonça
- João Gualberto Moreira Vasconcellos
- Wanda Alckmin
- Ítalo Campos
- Josina Nunes Drumond
- Getúlio Neves
- Matusalém Dias de Moura
- Marcos André Malta Dantas
- Douglas Puppin
- Fábio Daflon
- Magda Lugon
- José Ignácio Ferreira
- Anaximandro Amorim

There are also several corresponding members throughout Brazil and in other countries.
