= Prison Romance =

- Russian: Тюремный романс
- Directed by: Yevgeni Tatarsky
- Written by: Sergey Solovyev
- Starring: Aleksandr Abdulov; Yury Kuznetsov; Aristarkh Livanov; Marina Neyolova; Boris Sokolov
- Cinematography: Pavel Lebeshev
- Edited by: Irina Vigdortchik
- Music by: Sergey Kuryokhin
- Release date: 1993
- Country: Russia
- Language: Russian

Prison Romance (Russian: Тюремный романс, romanized: Tyuremnyy romans) is a 1993 Russian drama film directed by Yevgeni Tatarsky.

== Plot ==
The film tells the story of a female investigator who falls in love with a criminal, whose case she is being conducting, and helps him to escape.

== Cast ==
- Aleksandr Abdulov as Artynov
- Yury Kuznetsov as Yuri Kuznetsov
- Aristarkh Livanov as Aristarkh Livanov
- Marina Neyolova as Elena Andreevna
- Boris Sokolov as Boris Sokolov
