= Whoever Softer =

- Directed by: Abay Karpykov
- Written by: Abay Karpykov; Leila Ahinzhanova
- Produced by: Andrey Razumovsky; Yury Romanenko; Serik Zhubandykov; Anar Kashaganova; Oraz Rymzhanov
- Starring: Bopesh Jandaev; Kseniya Kachalina
- Cinematography: Nikolay Kirienkov; Aleksey Berkovich; George Gidt
- Music by: Leonid Desyatnikov
- Production companies: Kazakhfilm; RusComKino
- Release date: 1996
- Running time: 92 min
- Countries: Kazakhstan; Russia
- Language: Russian

Whoever Softer (Russian: Тот, кто нежнее, romanized: Tot, kto nezhnee) is a feature film director by Abay Karpykov.

== Plot ==
A young man by the name of Danesh is hospitalized with a broken leg. An old man, his roommate at the hospital ward, tells Danesh about two relics: tamga (gold plate) and a ruby. Once a year with their help it is possible to find treasure in the Canyon of Scorpio. Tamga was brought from abroad by Arab sheikhs, who are waiting for a messenger from the old man. After the old man's death, his sisters give Danesh the ruby and map of the Canyon and he goes off in search of treasure. Ramazan, a bandit who kidnapped translator Alyona, who can read the Arabic inscription on the tamga, becomes Danesh's opponent.

== Cast ==
- Bopesh Jandaev as Danesh
- Kseniya Kachalina as Alyona
- Nikolay Stotsky as Gosha
- Andrei Rostotsky as Ramazan
- Farhat Abdraimov as Farhat
- Bolot Beyshenaliyev as Sultan Khan Giray
- Aristarkh Livanov as Baigali

== Critical reception ==
- Sergey Kudryavtsev:

One review said that at first, everything is unnecessarily meaningful, full of secrets and omissions. In the history of rivalry between two hard-hearted Kazakh brothers because of someone else's wealth, there is a lot of seriousness and pomposity that is not appropriate; is felt primarily in the behavior of Russian actors Andrei Rostotsky and Aristarkh Livanov. Paradoxically, the debutante Farhat Abdraimov makes a mocking and good-natured element of everything happening in the comic role of a seemingly formidable fat man who has an unexpectedly thin voice and a completely mild temper.
