= Lúcio Cardoso =

Brazilian novelist, playwright, and poet

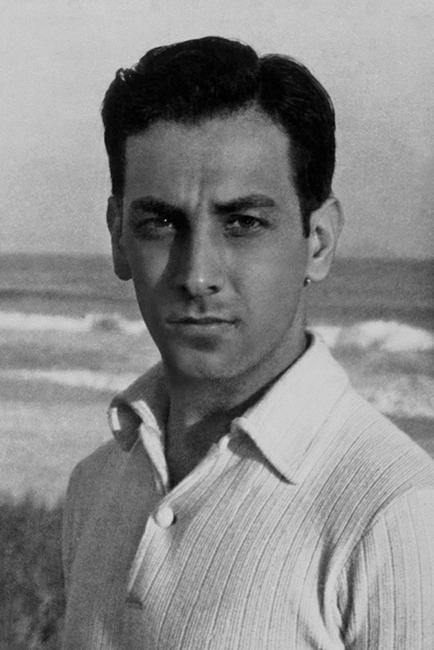
- Born: 14 August 1912; Curvelo, Minas Gerais, Brazil
- Died: 22 September 1968 (aged 56); Rio de Janeiro, Brazil

Joaquim Lúcio Cardoso Filho (August 14, 1912 – September 22, 1968) was a Brazilian novelist, playwright, and poet.

== Biography ==
The son of an impoverished but prominent family in Curvelo, Minas Gerais, Lúcio Cardoso was the brother of Adauto Lúcio Cardoso, a congressman for the center-right National Democratic Union and later justice of the Supreme Federal Court; and of Maria Helena Cardoso, who became a respected writer herself as a memorialist, including the editing of the posthumous memoirs of her brother Lúcio (Por onde andou meu coração, 1967; Vida-vida, 1973; and Sonata perdida: Anotações de uma velha dama digna, 1979).

At an early age, after attending school in Belo Horizonte, Cardoso moved to Rio de Janeiro, where he got a job in the Equitativa insurance company. He soon came to the notice of the group of writers around the wealthy industrialist (and a poet himself) Augusto Frederico Schmidt, who published his first works. Many of these writers, including Otávio de Faria and Cornélio Penna, were, like Cardoso, Catholic—and, in the twin case of Cardoso and Otávio de Faria, both Catholic and homosexual. In a time when Brazilian literature was dominated by leftist, regionalist themes, these writers were less interested in the then-dominant political concerns of Brazilian writing than in inner experience and themes of human redemption and personal tragedy. This paramount value placed upon the subjective character of writing was a characteristic Cardoso shared also with his younger contemporary Clarice Lispector, who fell in love with Cardoso when she was a young woman, and who remained a close friend until his death.

Cardoso's first novel, Maleita (Malaria)–the story of an engineer stranded in a backwater in Minas Gerais–did not stray far from the dominant regionalist themes, which, however, he forsook after 1936, with his third novel Luz no Subsolo, in favour of psychological introspection.

Cardoso was enormously prolific in several genres, including the theater, where, together with the Afro-Brazilian activist Abdias do Nascimento, he started the Teatro Experimental do Negro, Brazil's first black theater company. With Paulo César Saraceni, he was responsible for the first feature-length film of the nascent Cinema Novo, Porto das caixas—based on a true story about a crime in the municipality of Itaboraí, then a backwater rural community in the state of Rio de Janeiro. Perhaps his most famous novel is Crônica da casa assassinada (Chronicle of the Murdered House), 1959, a Faulknerian saga of a decaying patriarchal family in Minas Gerais. In this novel, one of the chief characters, Timóteo, is the family's gay scion, who lives secluded in the ancestral mansion, always dressed in his mother's old clothes, and who stands for the unravelling of the traditional order embodied in the mansion.

A famous figure in the bohemian milieu of Rio de Janeiro—"Ipanema should be called Lúcio Cardoso", according to one friend—his health deteriorated because of his alcoholism and dependence on prescription drugs. On December 7, 1962, at the height of his creativity, he suffered a debilitating stroke that left him partially paralyzed. He struggled unsuccessfully to recover his ability to speak and write, and when that failed he turned to painting.

On September 22, 1968, following another stroke, he died in Rio de Janeiro.

== Select bibliography ==
- Maleita, Schmidt Ed., Rio de Janeiro, 1934.
- Salgueiro, José Olympio, Rio de Janeiro, 1935.
- A luz no subsolo, José Olympio, Rio de Janeiro, 1936.
- Mãos vazias, José Olympio, Rio de Janeiro, 1938.
- Histórias da Lagoa Grande, Globo, Porto Alegre, 1939.
- O desconhecido, José Olympio, Rio de Janeiro, 1940.
- Céu escuro, Vamos Lêr!, Rio de Janeiro, 1940.
- Poesias, José Olympio, Rio de Janeiro, 1941.
- Dias perdidos, José Olympio, Rio de Janeiro, 1943.
- Novas poesias, José Olympio, Rio de Janeiro, 1944.
- O escravo (play), Zélio Valverde Ed., Rio de Janeiro, 1944.
- Inácio, in Dez romancistas falam de seus personagens, Ed. Condé, Rio de Janeiro, 1946.
- A professora Hilda, José Olympio, Rio de Janeiro, 1946.
- O anfiteatro, Livraria Agir, Rio de Janeiro, 1946.
- O enfeitiçado, José Olympio, Rio de Janeiro, 1954.
- Crônica da casa assassinada, José Olympio, Rio de Janeiro, 1959. Translated by Margaret Jull Costa and Robin Patterson as Chronicle of the Murdered House (Open Letter, 2016).
- Diário I, Elos, Rio de Janeiro, 1961
- O mistério dos MMM, in collaboration with João Condé. O Cruzeiro, Rio de Janeiro, 1962.
- Diário completo, José Olympio/INL, Rio de Janeiro, 1970.
- Três histórias da província, Bloch, Rio de Janeiro, 1969.
- Três histórias da cidade, Bloch, Rio de Janeiro, 1969.
- O viajante (Unfinished novel, edited and prefaced by Octavio de Faria). José Olympio, Rio de Janeiro, 1973.
- Poemas inéditos, (Introduced and edited by Octávio de Faria, prefaced by João Etienne Filho), Nova Fronteira, Rio de Janeiro, 1982.
