= 21st Moscow International Film Festival =

Film festival

- Location: Moscow, Russia
- Founded: 1959
- Awards: Grand Prix
- Festival date: 19–29 July 1999
- Website: Website

The 21st Moscow International Film Festival was held from 19 to 29 July 1999. The Golden St. George was awarded to the Japanese film Will to Live directed by Kaneto Shindo.

== Jury ==
- Fernando Solanas (Argentina – President of the Jury)
- Florestano Vancini (Italy)
- Adam Greenberg (United States)
- Shahla Nahid (France)
- Tolomush Okeyev (Kyrgyzstan)
- Valery Todorovsky (Russia)
- Antonio Giménez-Rico (Spain)
- Katia Tchenko (France)

== Films in competition ==
The following films were selected for the main competition:

English title	Original title	Director(s)	Production country
The Kite	Saranggola	Gil Portes	Philippines
Outlaw	Ormai è fatta!	Enzo Monteleone	Italy
Guinevere	Guinevere	Audrey Wells	United States
Dirty Linen	Panni sporchi	Mario Monicelli	Italy
The Dilettante	La Dilettante	Pascal Thomas	France
Will to Live	Ikitai	Kaneto Shindo	Japan
Ambush	Rakujarven	Olli Saarela	Finland
Black Out p.s. Red Out	Black Out p.s. Red Out	Menelaos Karamaghiolis	Greece, France, Portugal
The Building	Chung cu	Việt Linh	Vietnam
Traveller	O Viajante	Paulo César Saraceni	Brazil
A Sweet Scent of Death	Un dulce olor a muerte	Gabriel Retes	Mexico, Spain, Argentina
Strastnoy Boulevard	Strastnoy bulvar	Vladimir Khotinenko	Russia
Passion	Passion	Peter Duncan	Australia, United States
The Dance	Dansinn	Ágúst Guðmundsson	Iceland
Fara	Fara	Abai Karpykov	Russia, Kazakhstan
A Time for Defiance	La hora de los valientes	Antonio Mercero	Spain
6:3 Play It Again Tutti	6:3 avagy, Játszd újra Tutti	Péter Tímár	Hungary

== Awards ==
- Golden St. George: Will to Live by Kaneto Shindo
- Special Silver St. George: A Time for Defiance by Antonio Mercero
- Silver St. George:
  - Best Director: Ágúst Guðmundsson for The Dance
  - Best Actor: Farkhad Abdraimov for Fara
  - Best Actress: Catherine Frot for The Dilettante
- Prix FIPRESCI: Will to Live by Kaneto Shindo
- Special Mention:
  - Traveller by Paulo César Saraceni
  - Strastnoy Boulevard by Vladimir Khotinenko
- Honorable Prize: For the contribution to cinema: Marco Bellocchio (director)
