= Carlos Nejar =

Brazilian poet, author, translator and critic

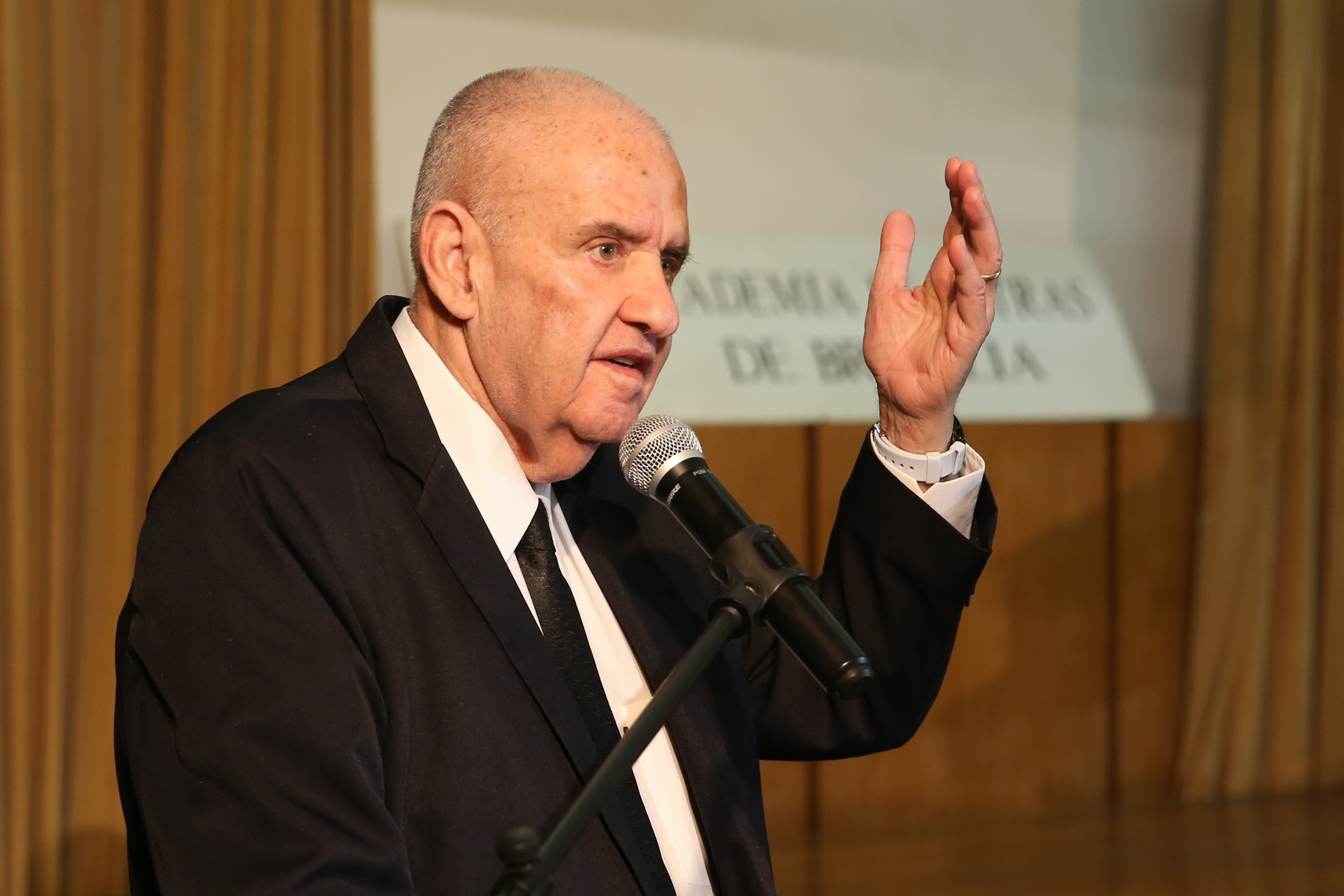
Nejar in 2017

Luis Carlos Verzoni Nejar, better known as Carlos Nejar (born January 11, 1939, in Porto Alegre), is a Brazilian poet, author, translator and critic, and a member of the Academia Brasileira de Letras. One of the most important poets of its generation, Nejar, also called "o poeta do pampa brasileiro", is distinguished for his use of an extensive vocabulary, alliteration, and pandeism. His first book, Sélesis, was published in 1960.

Born to a father of Syrian and Lebanese descent, and a mother of French and Italian descent, Nejar was elected to the fourth seat of the Brazilian Academy of Letters on November 24, 1988, succeeding Viana Moog. He is also a member of the Academia Espírito-santense de Letras.

== Works ==
Poetry

- Sélesis – Livraria do Globo, Porto Alegre, 1960.
- Livro de Silbion – editora Difusão de Cultura, Porto Alegre, 1963.
- Livro do tempo – editora Champagnat, Porto Alegre, 1965.
- O campeador e o vento – editora Sulina, Porto Alegre, 1966.
- Danações – José Álvaro Editor, Rio de Janeiro, em 1969.
- Ordenações, editora Globo em convênio com o Instituto Nacional do Livro (INL). Prêmio Jorge de Lima, Porto Alegre, 1971.
- Canga (Jesualdo Monte), editora Civilização Brasileira, Rio de Janeiro, em 1971.
- Casa dos arreios – editora Globo, em convênio com o INL, Porto Alegre, 1973.
- O poço do calabouço, coleção "Círculo de Poesia", Livraria Moraes Editores, Lisboa, 1974. Prêmio Fernando Chinaglia, para a melhor obra publicada no ano de 1974, pela União Brasileira de Escritores, Rio.
- O poço do calabouço, editora Salamandra, Rio de Janeiro, 1977.
- De sélesis a danações, editora Quíron, em convênio com o INL, 1975.
- Somos poucos, editora Crítica, Rio de Janeiro, em 1976.
- Árvore do mundo, editora Nova Aguilar e convênio com o INL, 1977, Prêmio Luíza Cláudio de Souza, do Pen Clube do Brasil, como melhor obra publicada naquele ano.
- O chapéu das estações, editora Nova Fronteira, Rio de Janeiro, 1978.
- Três livros: O poço do calabouço, Árvore do mundo e Chapéu das estações, num só volume – Círculo do Livro, São Paulo, 1979.
- Os viventes, editora Nova Fronteira, Rio de Janeiro, 1979.
- Um país o coração, editora Nova Fronteira, Rio de Janeiro, 1980.
- Obra poética (I) – (Sélesis, Livro de Silbion, Livro do Tempo, O Campeador e o Vento, Danações, Ordenações, Canga, Casa dos Arreios, Somos Poucos e o inédito, A Ferocidade das Coisas), editora Nova Fronteira, Rio de Janeiro, 1980. Prêmio Érico Veríssimo, Câmara Municipal de Porto Alegre, 1981.
- Livro de Gazéis, Moraes Editores, "Coleção Canto Universal", Lisboa, Portugal, 1983; Editora Record, Rio de Janeiro, 1984.
- Os melhores poemas de Carlos Nejar, editora Global, São Paulo, 1984.
- A genealogia da palavra (Antologia Pessoal), editora Iluminuras, São Paulo, 1989.
- Minha voz se chama Carlos (Antologia), Unidade Editorial, Prefeitura Municipal de Porto Alegre, 1994.
- Amar, a mais alta constelação, Livraria José Olympio Editora, Rio de Janeiro, 1991, Troféu Francisco Igreja, da União Brasileira de Escritores, Rio.
- Meus estimados vivos (com ilustrações de Jorge Solé), Editora Nemar, Vitória, ES, em 1991.
- Elza dos pássaros, ou a ordem dos planetas, editora Nejarim-Paiol da Aurora, Guarapari, ES, 1993.
- Canga (Jesualdo Monte), edição bilíngüe (espanhol e português), tradução ao espanhol de Luis Oviedo, editora Nejarim-Paiol da Aurora, Guarapari, ES, 1993.
- Simón Vento Bolívar, bilíngüe (português e espanhol), tradução ao espanhol de Luis Oviedo, editora Age, Porto Alegre, RS, 1993.
- Arca da Aliança (personagens bíblicos), editora Nejarim – Paiol da Aurora, Guarapari, ES, 1995.
- Os dias pelos dias (Canga, Árvore do mundo e O Poço do calabouço), Editora Topbooks, Rio de Janeiro, 1997.
- Sonetos do paiol, ao sul da aurora, LP&M Editores, Porto Alegre, RS, 1997.

Rapsódia

- A idade da aurora (Rapsódia), editora Massao-Ohno, São Paulo, comemorando os 30 anos de poesia do author, 1990.

Personae-poems

- Poemas dramáticos (Fausto, As parcas, Joana das Vozes, Miguel Pampa e Ulisses), editora Record, Rio, 1983.
- Vozes do Brasil (Auto de Romaria), Livraria José Olympio Editores, Rio de Janeiro, 1984.
- O pai das coisas, L&PM Editores, Porto Alegre, RS, 1985.
- Fausto, edição. bilíngüe (português e alemão). Tradução ao alemão de Kurt Sharf, editora Tchê, Porto Alegre, 1987.
- Miguel Pampa, editoras Nemar e Massao-Ohno, Vitória e São Paulo, em 1991.
- Teatro em versos (reunião num volume, com prefácio de Antônio Hohlfeldt), de Miguel Pampa, Fausto, Joana das Vozes, As parcas, Ulisses, Fogo branco (Vozes do Brasil), O pai das coisas e o inédito Auto do juízo final ou Deus não é uma andorinha, edição da Funarte, do Rio de Janeiro, 1998.

Prose poems

- Memórias do porão, livraria José Olympio editora, Rio de Janeiro, 1985.
- Aquém da infância, editora Nejarim – Paiol da Aurora (comemorando os 35 anos de poesia), Guararapi, ES, 1995.

Children's literature

- Jericó soletrava o Sol & As coisas pombas, editora Globo, Rio de Janeiro, 1986.
- O menino-rio, 2a edição, editora Mercado Aberto, Porto Alegre, RS, 1985.
- Era um vento muito branco, editora Globo, Rio de Janeiro, 1987. Prêmio Monteiro Lobato, da Associação Brasileira de Crítica Literária, Rio, 1988.
- A formiga metafísica, editora Globo, Rio de Janeiro, 1988.
- Zão, editora Melhoramentos, São Paulo, 1988. Prêmio como o melhor livro infanto-juvenil da Associação Paulista de Críticos de Arte, 1989.
- Grande vento (com ilustrações de Cristiano Chagas), em forma de quadrinhos, Edições Consultor, Rio de Janeiro, 1997.

Novels (transficção)

- Um certo Jaques Netan, Coleção Aché dos "Imortais da Literatura", S. Paulo, 1991, Editora Record, Rio de Janeiro.
- O túnel perfeito, editora Relume-Dumará e UFES, Rio de Janeiro, 1994.
- Carta aos loucos, editora Record, Rio de Janeiro, 1998.

Essay

- O fogo é uma chama úmida (Reflexões sobre a poesia contemporânea), "Coleção Afrânio Peixoto", edição da Academia Brasileira de Letras, Rio de Janeiro, 1995.

Anthologies and books (including his poems)

- A novíssima poesia brasileira, organizada por Walmir Ayala, série 2a. Cadernos Brasileiros. Rio de Janeiro, 1962.
- La poesía brasileña en la actualidad, organizada por Gilberto Mendonça Teles, Editora Letras, Montevideo, 1969.
- Dois poetas novos do Brasil (Antologia com Armindo Trevisan), "Círculo de Poesia". Editora Moraes editores, Lisboa, Portugal, 1972.
- Brasilianische poesie des 20. Jahrhunderts (poesia brasileira do século XX), organização, tradução e estudos de Curt Meyer-Clason. Deutsches Taschenbuch Verlag, Berlim, Alemanha, 1975.
- Lateinamerika – Stimmmen Eines Kontinents. Antologia da Literatura Latino-Americana, com organização, tradução e estudos de Gunter W. Lorenz Erdmann, Editorial Basiléia, Alemanha, 1974.
- Antologia do círculo de poesia (organizada por Pedro Tamen), Livraria Moraes Editores, Lisboa, Portugal, 1977.
- Cinco poetas gaúchos – Antologia, Assembléia Legislativa do Rio Grande do Sul, Porto Alegre, 1977.
- Las voces solidarias (organização e tradução de Santiago Kovadloff). Editora Calicanto. Buenos Aires, Argentina, 1978.
- Poemas – tradução de Perez Só, in Poesía n. 42, Valencia, Carabobo, Venezuela, 1978.
- Antologia da literatura rio-grandense contemporânea, organizada por Antônio Holfeldt, vol. 2, L&PM Editores, Porto Alegre, 1979.
- World literature today, Formerly Books Abroad. Tradução de Richard Preto Rodas. University of Oklahoma, US, vol. 53, Winter, 1979.
- Histórias do vinho – L&PM editores (vários colaboradores), Porto Alegre, 1980.
- Tree of the world (antologia), tradução e seleção do Dr. Giovanni Pontiero. New Directions, US. An Internacional Anthology of Prose & Poetry n. 40, 1980.
- Antologia da novíssima poesia brasileira, organizada por Gramiro de Matos e Manuel de Seabra. Livros-Horizonte, Lisboa, Portugal, 1981.
- Poems from Canga (antologia), tradução e seleção do Dr. Giovanni Ponteiro, Latin American Literature and Arts. Review nº 28, January/April 1981.

– Yoke (Canga) – Jesualdo Monte, tradução de Madeleine Picciotto. Quarterly Review of Literature. Poetry Series III. Edited by T & R. Weiss. Volume XXII. Princeton, New Jersey, US, 1981.

- A idade da eternidade, organizada por Antônio Osório. Editora Gota de Água. Porto, Portugal, 1981.
- Dieser tag voller vulcane. Tradução e seleção de Kurt Sharf. Verlag im Bauerhaus, Alemanha, 1984.
- Poetas contemporâneos, organização e seleção de Henrique L. Alves. Roswitha Kempf Editores, São Paulo, 1985.
- Antologie de la poésie bresilienne - tradução e seleção de Bernard Lorraine, Éditions Ouvrières. Dessin et Tolra. Paris, 1986.
- Savrmena paezija brazila (antologia da poesia brasileira). Seleção e tradução ao iugoslavo por André Kisil. Kruncsevac – Bajdala, 1987.
- Faust (edição bilíngüe português-alemão), tradução de Kurt Sharf. Ed. Tchê. Porto Alegre, RS, 1987.
- Anthologie de la nouvelle poésie brésilienne. Presentation de Serge Borgea. Tradução e seleção de Marcella Mortara. Éditions I'Harmattan, Paris, 1988.
- A paz – antologia de poetas e pintores, edição bilíngüe português-inglês, Fundação Banco do Brasil e Spala Editora, Rio de Janeiro, 1990.
- Van der grausamkeit der dinge (a ferocidade das coisas).Tradução e seleção de Kurt Sharf. Sirene. Zetschrift für Literatur. München, Alemanha. April 1992.
- De amar e amor (Sete Poetas), seleção, ilustrações e edição (trabalho gráfico) do pintor Jorge Solé, Vitória, ES, 1993.
- The age of the dawn (A idade da aurora), seleção e tradução de Madeleine Picciotto. Quarterly Review of Literature. Poetry Series XII. T & R. Weiss, 50th Anniversary Anthology. New Jersey, Princeton, US, 1994.
- Poemas de amor (antologia), com apresentação e seleção de Walmir Ayala. Ediouro, Rio de Janeiro, 1991.
- Pérolas do Brasil (Brazilia Gyöngyei), tradução e seleção de Lívia Paulini. Ego. Budapest, 1993.
- Brazil issue (International Poetry Review) – introdução crítica, tradução de Steven F. White. University of North Carolina at Greensboro, US, Spring – 1997.
- Vinte Poetas Brasileiros - prefácio, seleção e tradução de Sílvio Castro, Ed. Veneza, Itália, 1997.
- Un die brasilianische lyrik der gegenwart (Modernismo Brasileiro). Introdução crítica, seleção e tradução de Curt Meyer-Clason, Edition Drckhhaus Neunzehnhundert Siebenundneunzig, München, Alemanha, 1997.

Anthologies (as editor)

- Antologia de um emigrante do paraíso - Antônio Osório. Com prefácio e seleção de poemas. Editora Massao-Ohno, São Paulo, 1981.
- Antologia da poesia portuguesa contemporânea (A partir de Victorino Nemésio). Apresentação, seleção de poemas e dados bio-bibliográficos. Editora Massao-Ohno, São Paulo, 1982.
- Antologia da poesia brasileira contemporânea (A partir de 1945). Apresentação, seleção de poemas e dados bio-bibliográficos. Prefácio de Eduardo Portella. Imprensa Nacional e Casa da Moeda, Lisboa, Portugal, 1986.

Translations

- Ficções, de Jorge Luis Borges, Editora Globo, Porto Alegre, RS, 1970.
- Elogio da sombra, de Jorge Luís Borges (em parceria com Alfredo Jacques), Editora Globo, Porto Alegre, RS, 1971.
- Memorial de Ilha Negra (I. De onde nasce a chuva), de Pablo Neruda. editora Salamandra, Rio, 1980. Prêmio de melhor tradução da Associação Paulista de Críticos de Arte.
- Cem sonetos de amor, de Pablo Neruda, LP&M Editores. Porto Alegre, RS, 1979.
- As uvas e o vento, de Pablo Neruda. LP&M Editores, Porto Alegre, RS, 1980.

== Sources ==
- "Pandeísmo em Carlos Nejar", in Última Hora, Rio de Janeiro, May 17, 1978.
