= Otávio de Faria =

Brazilian journalist and writer

A picture of Otávio de Faria

Otávio de Faria (October 15, 1908 – October 17, 1980) was a Brazilian novelist, journalist, and literary critic. He was elected a member of the Brazilian Academy of Letters on January 13, 1972. He was most noted as author of the monumental testimonial (and prophetic) A Tragédia burguesa (The Bourgeois Tragedy).

In a noted essay, "Pandeísmo em Carlos Nejar", de Faria "spoke of the pandeism of Carlos Nejar"; in the evaluation of Giovanni Pontiero,

Otávio de Faria póde falar, com razão, de um pandeísmo de Carlos Nejar. Não uma poesia panteísta, mas pandeísta. Quero dizer, uma cosmogonia, um canto geral, um cancioneiro do humano e do divino. Mas o divino no humano".

Translation:

"Otávio de Faria spoke of the pandeism of Carlos Nejar. Not a pantheist poetry, but pandeist. I want to say, a cosmogony, one I sing generally, a chansonnier of the human being and the holy ghost. But the holy ghost in the human being.

He was born in Rio de Janeiro, son of Alberto Faria and Maria Teresa de Almeida Faria, and in Rio de Janeiro he died.
