= Santiago Kovadloff =

Argentine essayist, poet and translator

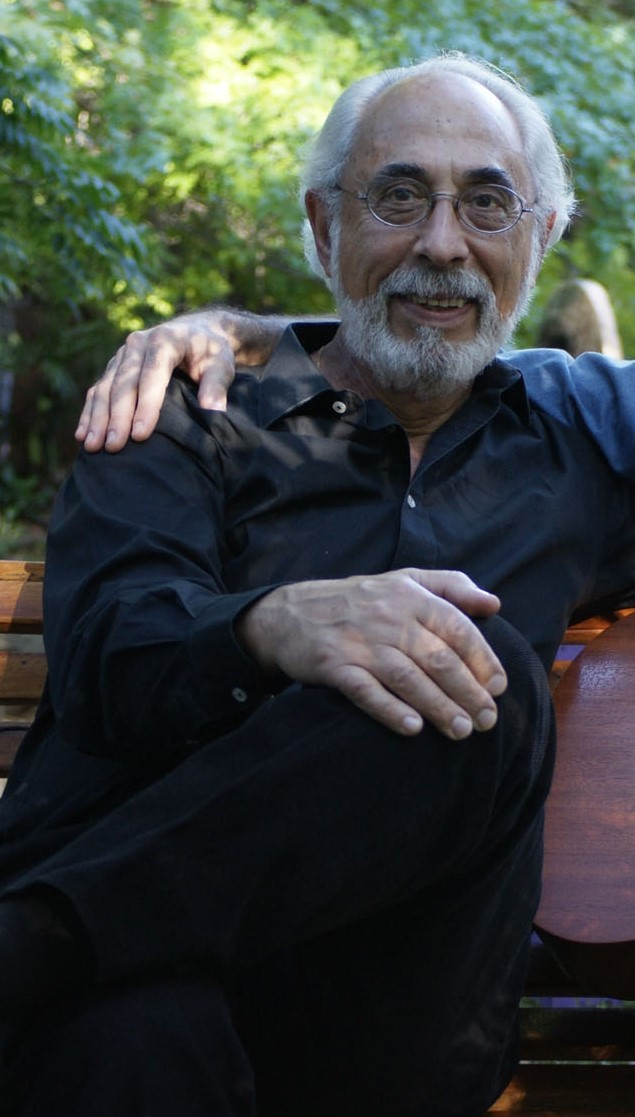
- Born: 14 December 1942; Buenos Aires
- Alma mater: University of Buenos Aires
- Style: poetry
- Awards: Illustrious Citizen of Buenos Aires (2019); honorary doctorate (CAECE University, 2019); honorary doctorate (Universidad de Ciencias Empresariales y Sociales); Pluma de Honor (2010)

Santiago Kovadloff (born December 14, 1942) is an Argentine essayist, poet, translator, anthologist of Portuguese literature and author of children's stories. He was born in Buenos Aires where he graduated in Philosophy at the University of Buenos Aires with a thesis on the thought of Martin Buber called "The hearer of God". Some of his works were translated into Hebrew, Portuguese, German, Italian and French and others have spread throughout Spain.

Honorary professor at the Universidad Autónoma de Madrid and Doctor Honoris Causa by the Universidad de Ciencias Empresariales y Sociales(UCES). Since 1992 a member of the Royal Spanish Academy, since 1998 member of the Academia Argentina de Letras since 2010 by the National Academy of Moral and Political Sciences and the National Academy of Journalism. Member of the Court of Ethics of the Jewish Community of Argentina until dissolved.

He works professionally as a philosophy professor and lecturer. Is permanent collaborator of the newspaper La Nación. Besides, he lined up a trio of music and poetry with Marcelo Moguilevsky and César Lerner.

== Translations ==
He edited the first complete Spanish version of Book of Disquiet (2000), Fernando Pessoa, and the Fictions Interlude (2004). Portuguese to Spanish, translated texts of poets Carlos Drummond de Andrade, Manuel Bandeira, Ferreira Gullar, João Cabral de Melo Neto and Murilo Mendes, Vinicius de Moraes, Mário de Andrade, Manuel Bandeira, Murilo Mendes, Carlos Drummond de Andrade, João Cabral de Melo Neto, Machado de Assis, João Guimarães Rosa, Noemia de Souza, Mário de Sá-Carneiro.

In the 1980s he translated into Portuguese numerous Argentine poets and many compositions of Joan Manuel Serrat and, a decade earlier, one of the shows of the Argentine musical comedy set Les Miserables, presented in São Paulo, Brazil, in 1975.

== Honours ==
- Gaza Honor in Poetry and Essay by Sociedad Argentina de Escritores (1986 and 1987).
- First National Prize Literature Test "Common Presence" of Bogotá. (1991).
- First National Prize for Literature of Argentina, and essayist (1992).
- Platinum Konex, literary essay category. (1994).
- Reader Emeritus of the National Library of Argentina (1995).
- Prize Esteban Echeverría given by the group People of Letters for his work as an essayist. (1997).
- First Prize for Poetry of the City of Buenos Aires (2000).
- Platinum Konex, philosophical essay category. (2004).
- Citizen of the City of Buenos Aires (2009)
- Award of Honor Pen awarded by the Academy of Journalism Argentina, for the task that develops in print. (2010).
- Pedro Henríquez Ureña International Essay Prize, awarded by the Mexican Academy of Language

== Publications ==
=== Essays ===
- Primary Silence (1993)
- What irremediable (1996)
- Sense and risk of everyday life (1998)
- The new ignorance (2001)
- Trials of Intimacy (2002)
- A biography of the Rain (2004)
- The constraints of the day (2007)
- The enigma of suffering (2008)
- The Fear of Politics (2010)

=== Children's Stories ===
- Republic of Evidence (1993)
- The left ankle (1994)
- Agustina and Everything (2001)
- Life is always more or less (2005)
- Natalia and queluces (2005)

=== Poetry ===
- Areas and investigations (1978)
- Open Canto (1979)
- Certain facts (1985)
- Ben David (1988)
- The background of Days (1992)
- Man in the Afternoon (1997)
- Ruins of the diaphanous (2009)
- Lines of hand (2012)
