= Paulo César Saraceni =

Brazilian film director

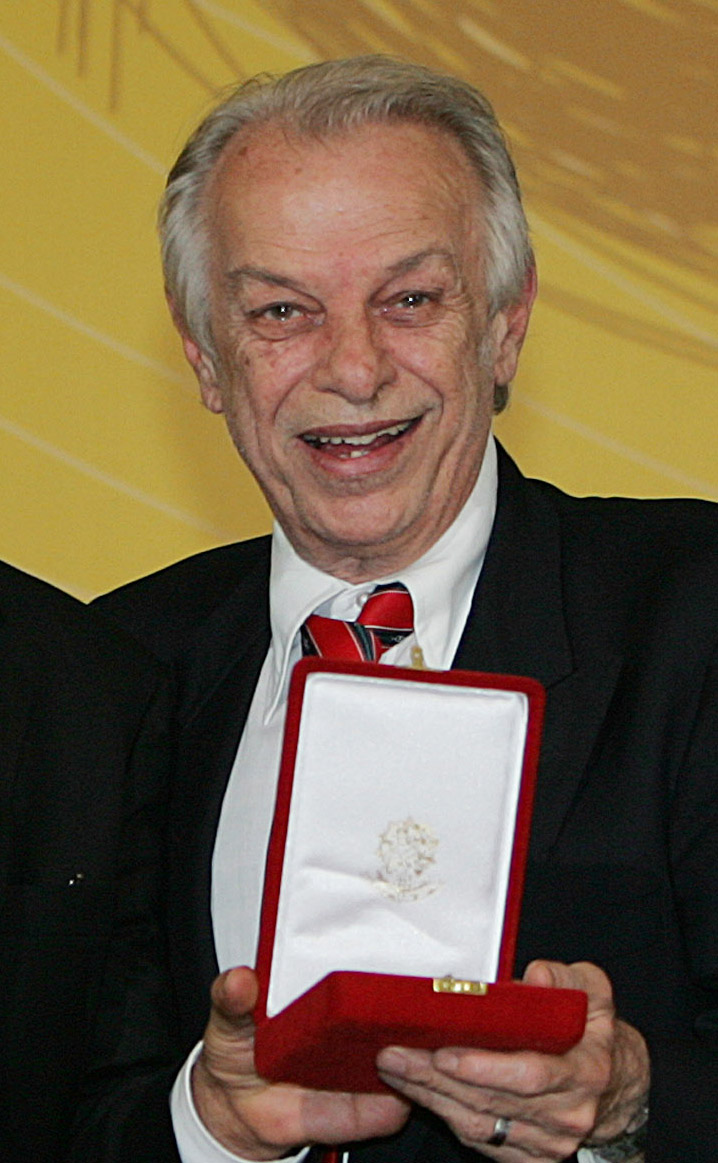
- Saraceni in 2006
- Born: 5 November 1933; Rio de Janeiro, Brazil
- Died: 14 April 2012 (aged 78); Rio de Janeiro, Brazil
- Occupations: Film director, screenwriter
- Years active: 1960-2011

Paulo César Saraceni (5 November 1933 – 14 April 2012) was a Brazilian film director and screenwriter. He directed 14 films between 1960 and 2011. His 1999 film Traveller was entered into the 21st Moscow International Film Festival where it won a Special Mention.

== Selected filmography ==
- Traveller (1999)
