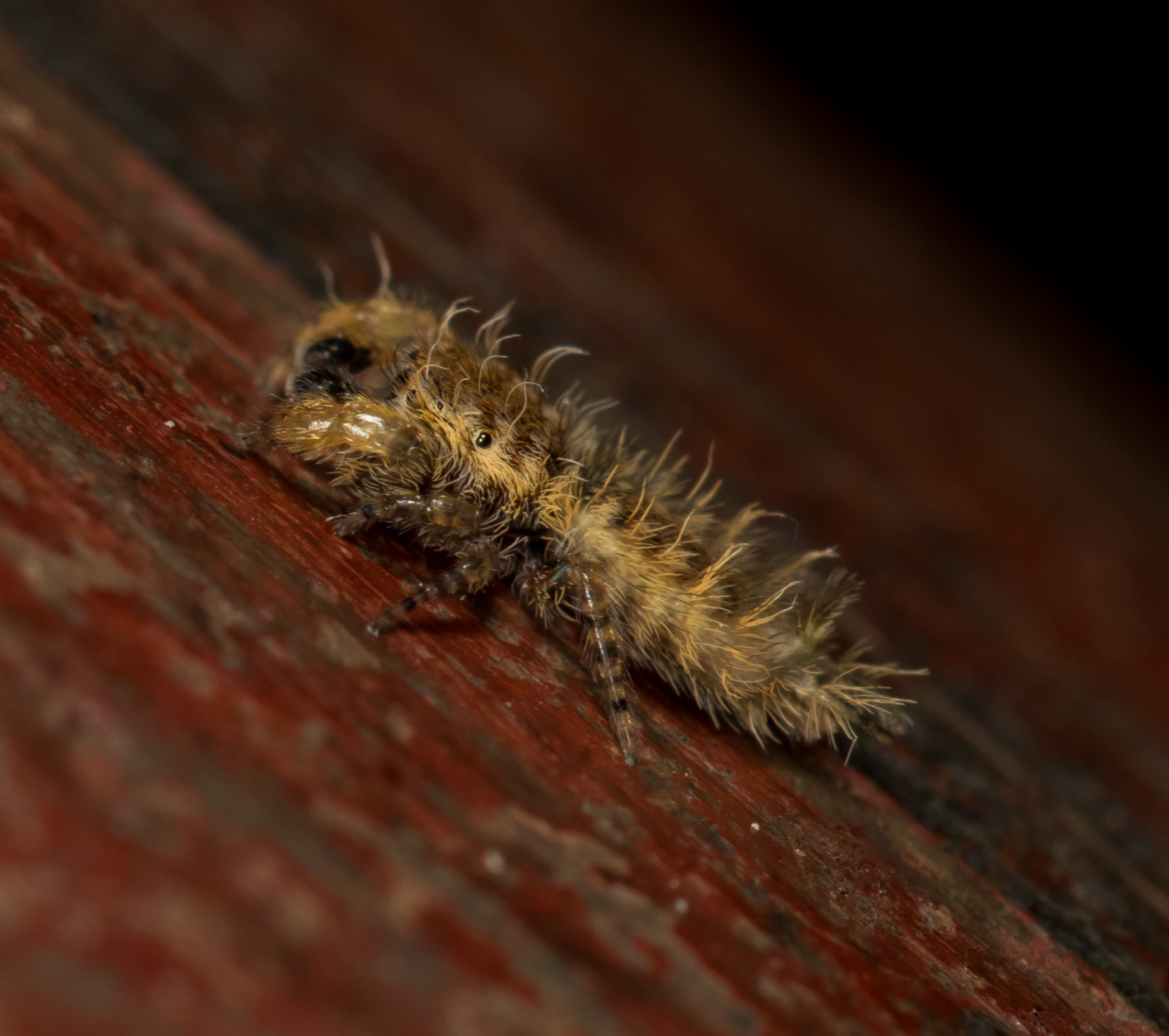
- Male type specimen

Scientific classification
- Kingdom: Animalia
- Phylum: Arthropoda
- Subphylum: Chelicerata
- Class: Arachnida
- Order: Araneae
- Infraorder: Araneomorphae
- Family: Salticidae
- Genus: Uroballus
- Species: U. carlei

Binomial name
- Uroballus carlei Logunov & Obenauer, 2019

= Uroballus carlei =

Species of spider

Uroballus carlei is a species of jumping spider of the genus Uroballus. It is endemic to Hong Kong.

Like U. koponeni, this species seems to mimic small caterpillars, likely those of lichen moths. The authors of the description hypothesize that U. carlei might normally live in tree canopies.

== Distribution ==
Uroballus carlei has been described from one male, which was collected in 2018 from a railing at the edge of Shek O Country Park, Hong Kong.

== Name ==
The species is named after American illustrator Eric Carle of The Very Hungry Caterpillar, at the occasion of his 90th birthday, the 50th anniversary of his most famous book, and to honor his contribution to early childhood nature education.

== Description ==
Like other species of this genus, U. carlei has unusually long spinnerets, and a flat and broadened carapace. The body of the male is about 3 mm long. The abdomen is unusually long, with a longitudinal serrate brown stripe, and densely covered with long erected hairs.

The female (probably immature) is only known from pictures in the book A Guide to the Spiders of Hong Kong (2016) by Dickson Wong.

== Behavior ==
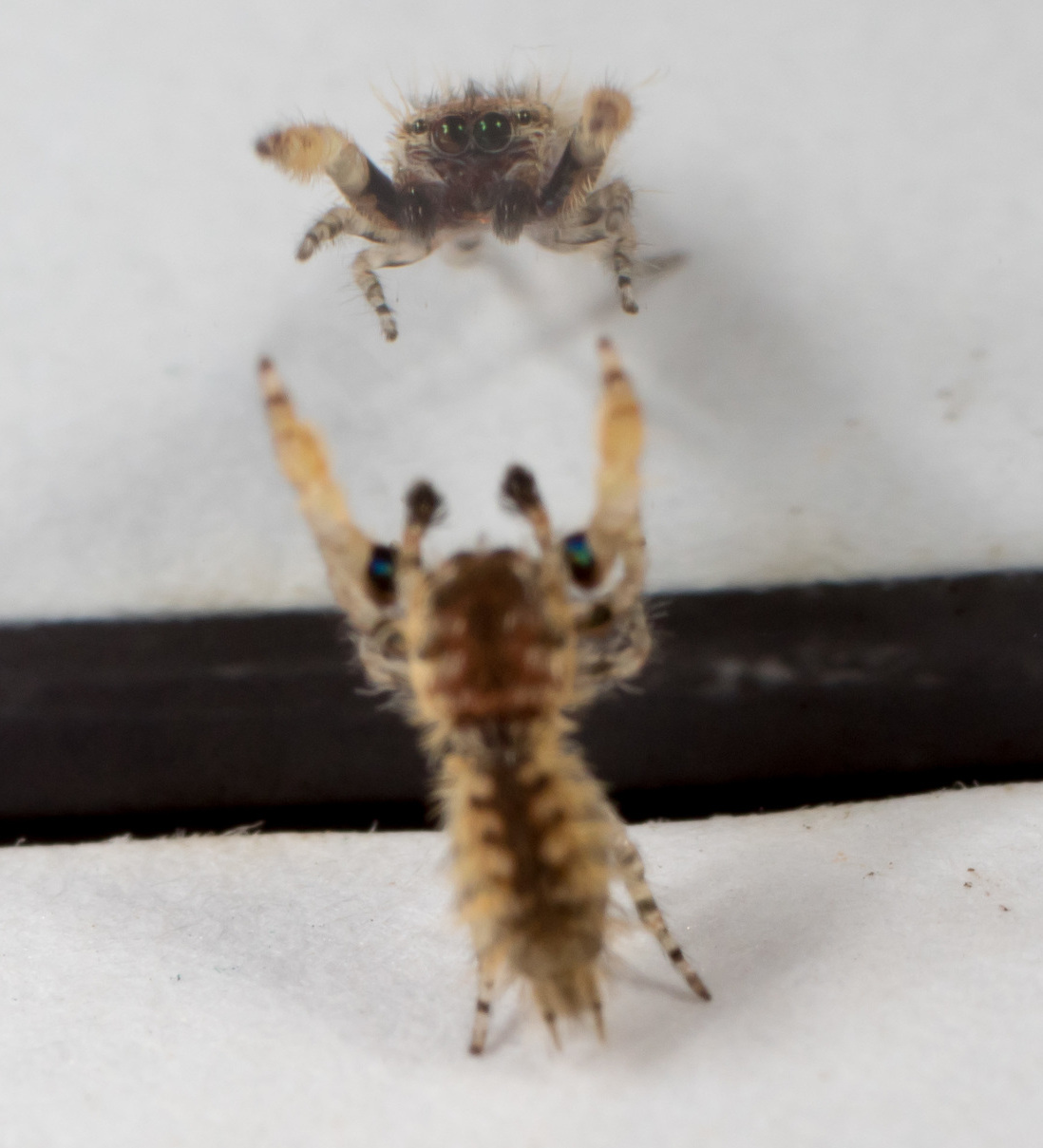
U. carlei male displaying to mirror image

The male moves rather slowly, with long rest phases. It rarely jumps, and might escape by falling down on a thread of several centimeters, then climbing back up. When encountering a mirror, it displays to its male mirror image.
