= Kokoro Library =

Japanese manga series by Nobuyuki Takagi and Yōsuke Kuroda

ココロ図書館 (Kokoro Toshokan)
- Genre: Slice of life, Drama, Comedy
- Manga
- Written by: Nobuyuki Takagi, Yōsuke Kuroda
- Illustrated by: Nobuyuki Takagi
- Published by: MediaWorks; Wani Books (2013 reprint)
- Imprint: Dengeki Comics EX; Gum Comics Plus (2013 reprint)
- Magazine: Dengeki Daioh
- Original run: April 2000 – July 2002
- Volumes: 3; 1 fan book; 2 (Wani Books 2013 reprint)
- Anime television series
- Directed by: Koji Masunari
- Written by: Yōsuke Kuroda
- Music by: Hisaaki Hogari
- Studio: Studio Deen
- Original network: TV Tokyo (eps 1-12); AT-X (ep 13)
- Original run: October 12, 2001 – December 28, 2001 (ep 12); February 17, 2002 (bonus ep 13)
- Episodes: 13 (12 + bonus episode)

Kokoro Library (ココロ図書館, Kokoro Toshokan) is a slice-of-life Japanese manga series by Nobuyuki Takagi and Yōsuke Kuroda, originally serialized between April 2000 and July 2002 in Monthly Comic Dengeki Daioh. It follows the peaceful daily lives of three sisters who live in a library.

The manga was adapted into a 13-episode anime television series directed by Koji Masunari, who is also known as the director of the anime OVA series Read or Die (2001) and Kamichu! (2005). It is described by critics as a prime example of the iyashikei or "healing type" anime genre.

== Plot ==
Kokoro Library is a heartwarming slice of life series depicting the peaceful everyday lives of three orphaned sisters as they take care of the library which also serves as their family home. The anime delves more deeply into the library's history, its connection to the local town, and challenges faced by the sisters.

Kokoro, the youngest, has just joined her sisters Aruto and Iina as an official librarian. The library receives few visitors, and each visit is often the subject of an entire episode. Kokoro learns the meaning of being a librarian, meets her favourite author, and takes a family trip to the seaside. The library is called "the place where miracles happen", although we see nothing more magical than Kokoro's ability to produce rainbows with her watering can.

Events take a dramatic twist when phantom thief Funny Tortoise steals a mysterious locked book which belonged to Kokoro's father, who died when she was very young. Worse, the town mayor announces that the library will be closed due to lack of visitors. Kokoro is heartbroken, but believes the answer may lie in the stolen book, which has meanwhile been returned to the library.

The next episode is seen from the point of view of a young soldier named Sant Jordi, (Note: 「サン・ジョルディ」, "San Jorudi". While this can be romanized in various ways, the name Sant Jordi is particularly referenced in the title of manga chapter 23, "Saint George's Day (サン・ジョルディの日)", referring to Diada de Sant Jordi, a Catalan holiday celebrated on April 23 by giving books; and in this episode's BGM on the soundtrack, titled "April 23, Clouds and Then Rain".) during a war which has seen the town heavily bombed. Jordi's positive attitude makes an impression on his comrades, who occupy a ruined library. When the town is approached by an enemy armored division, Jordi's decision to destroy the bridge without killing the enemy ultimately saves the town. He begins to distribute library books to the townsfolk to lift their spirits in the difficult post-war period, ultimately settling in the town and constructing Kokoro Library.

Kokoro, reading the story in what is revealed to be her father's diary of the war, finally has a connection to the parents she never knew. The sisters head to town hall to show the diary to the mayor, hoping to change her mind. They arrive to discover a massive protest against the library's shutdown—the people of the town have not forgotten Jordi's contributions. The mayor allows the library to remain open, and Kokoro and her sisters continue to live their peaceful days together in the library.

== Production ==
Yōsuke Kuroda, a scriptwriter who had highly appreciated Takagi's doujin works published under the name "Boo", heard from Takagi himself that he was going to retire from his company and train to become a manga artist. "It's too late to train to become a manga artist now when you have the ability," he said, and pitched Takagi to the editor-in-chief of Monthly Comic Dengeki Daioh, whom he knew.

The editor also appreciated Boo's drawing style and immediately gave him a positive response for serialization. At that time, Kuroda was instructed to write a scenario, which he accepted, and the serialization took shape. According to Kuroda, it took only an hour and a half from the time he was informed of Takagi's resignation to the time he informed Takagi that the serialization had been decided. As a result, Kuroda was in charge of the script for both the original story and the animation.

Kokoro Library was animated digitally, rather than on cels as had been used for Studio Deen's animated productions until the late 1990s. However, limited-edition hand-painted replica cels were made available to collectors for ¥5,000 by online sale.

The setting of Kokoro Library is ambiguous. The town is identified in signage as "Toaru City" (都亜瑠), a homonym for the phrase "a certain city", although it is never named in dialogue. We are never explicitly told the name of the country where the library is situated, or the year when the series takes place. Rather, it is a pastiche of Japanese and European cultural elements. Several pieces of mid-20th century technology appear: Iina drives a redecorated World War II Volkswagen Schwimmwagen, while other characters drive the post-war Citroën H Van and Citroën DS. In episode 11, Jordi's side carry the Karabiner 98k used by German troops in World War II, while the enemy armored unit fields the Russian T-34 and GAZ-67; however, neither side's nation is explicitly identified. Modern computers and cameras also appear, along with science fiction androids.

The anime was notable as Chiwa Saitō's first major voice acting role. Saitō would go on to perform over three hundred anime voice roles in the following two decades.

Kokoro and the comparoid June make appearances in Nobuyuki Takagi's 2003 manga Pure Marionation, set eight years after Kokoro Library.

== Cast ==
=== Main characters ===
Kokoro
Voiced by: Chiwa Saitō
Kokoro (こころ, Kokoro), aged 10, is the youngest of the three sisters, and calls herself "the girl with the same name as the library". She wears a red librarian uniform. She is positive, hardworking, and innocent. She loves to read books, and her favourite author is Himemiya Kirin. Her dream is to become a fully-fledged librarian. Her special skill is to make rainbows with her watering can. She is happy to be surrounded by her sisters. Her room is decorated with cats. She likes French toast, pudding, and cake, but dislikes celery and cauliflower. Her birthday is March 18th. She does not use a surname in the series, introducing herself as "Kokoro from Kokoro Library".
Aruto
Voiced by: Yumi Ichihara
Aruto (あると, Aruto), aged 15, is the middle daughter. She wears a black uniform, and wears glasses. She is strong-willed, a good cook, and has the special ability to sleep anywhere. She secretly writes novels under the pen name Himemiya Kirin, Kokoro's favourite author. Because she stays up late to write, she often takes naps in the morning. Her hobbies include reading and cooking, and her favourite foods are Chinese cooking and cake. Her birthday is December 19th.
Iina
Voiced by: Miyuki Sawashiro
Iina (いいな, Iina), aged 17, is the eldest of the three sisters. She wears a blue uniform. Her hobby is photography, and she takes many photographs of her sisters, especially Kokoro, and she has many photos of her on her wall. She is highly protective of Kokoro, and has trouble coping when Kokoro is away for a long time. She even sleeps with Kokoro plushies. She drives a redecorated military surplus white Schwimmwagen with the license plate "556" (goroawase for "ko-ko-ro"). Surprisingly, she is good with computers. She likes noodles, sweet things, and Assam milk tea. Her birthday is October 2nd.

The names of the three sisters together form the phrase "kokoro aru to ii na," meaning "it's good to have a heart". In the anime, it is revealed that the sisters were intentionally given these names by their parents in order to spell out this motto. This phrase appears as a subtitle on the cover of the manga, but is not immediately revealed in the anime, the DVDs for which instead use the subtitle "Do you remember these heartful things?"

=== Supporting cast ===
Akaha Okajima
Voiced by: Tomoko Kaneda
Akaha Okajima (岡嶋朱葉, Okajima Akaha), age 9, is a friend of Kokoro who visits the library. She lives in a villa nearby. Her mother is Midori Okajima. She is also a relative of Misato Fukami. Akaha and Kokoro met when they were younger, after she got lost while chasing squirrels. Like Kokoro, she enjoys reading.
Midori Okajima
Voiced by: Yoko Sasaki
Midori Okajima (岡嶋翠, Okajima Midori) is Akaha's mother and a visitor to the library. The character previously appeared as an original character of Takagi's for the Mirai Hachi Karuto Shoukai at Winter Comiket 1998.
Kit
Kit (キット, Kit) is Kokoro's cat.

=== Anime-only characters ===
A number of characters are original to the anime but do not appear in the manga.

Jun Uezawa
Voiced by: Shinichiro Miki
Jun Uezawa (上沢純, Uezawa Jun), age 20, is the truck driver who makes deliveries to Kokoro Library. He has a crush on Iina, but she is unaware of this. The sisters often take advantage of him to help with their plans, and he is often comically mistaken for a suspicious person.
Kaede Hoshino
Voiced by: Rio Natsuki
Kaede Hoshino (星野かえで, Hoshino Kaede) is the first visitor who Kokoro lends a book to. She rides a Vespa. She spends only a little time in town before she has to leave due to her job, but loves Kokoro Library at her first visit.
Bikers
Voiced by: Kiyoyuki Yanada, Kenji Hamada, Hiroaki Miura
Bikers who ride Harley-Davidson motorcycles. They sometimes give Kokoro a ride in their sidecar.
Sarara Saeki
Voiced by: Satsuki Yukino
Sarara Saeki (佐伯さらら, Saeki Sarara) is Himemiya Kirin's editor. She works for Celery Library's editorial development. She is aware of Aruto's secret identity as Himemiya Kirin.
Misato Fukami
Voiced by: Tomoe Hanba
Misato Fukami (深海みさと, Fukami Misato) is a girl who lives by the seaside. She suffers from poor health, having the same illness as her late mother. She is Akaha's relative. She is served by a butler (VA: Takuma Suzuki) and maid (VA: Yukiko Mannaka), who are overprotective of her due to her health, and try to prevent her from going outdoors. She is lonely, and dreams of being able to go outside to see the ocean up close and meet the dolphins she can see from her window.
Misato's Father
Voiced by: Nobuo Tobita
Misato's Father (みさとの父, Misato no chichi) is Misato Fukami's father.
Funny Tortoise
Voiced by: Keiji Fujiwara
Funny Tortoise (ファニートータス, Fanī Tōtasu) is a legendary thief and master of disguise. He makes his daring escapes in a hot air balloon.
Inspector Kajihara
Voiced by: Fumihiko Tachiki
Inspector Kajihara (梶原, Inspector Kajihara) is an officer working for Interpol to capture Funny Tortoise. He is supported by a team of female officers, Kaji's Angels. During the war he guarded the town as a member of Third Squad, one of only two soldiers in the unit with any military training. He lost his wife and children during the war, after which he became argumentative and on edge, often fighting with Aigame.
Kaji's Angels
Voiced by: Chiaki Takahashi, Eri Saitō, Hiroko Takahashi, Mami Kosuge, Nao Takamori
Kaji's Angels (カージーズエンジェル, Kaji's Angel) are a group of uniformed all-female officers who support Inspector Kajihara.
Itou
Voiced by: Urarako Suzuki
Itou (イトウ, Itou) is one of Kaji's Angels.
Hibiki Asakura
Voiced by: Michiko Neya
Hibiki Asakura (朝倉ひびき, Asakura Hibiki) is the examiner for Kokoro's librarian training.
June
Voiced by: Maaya Sakamoto
June (じゅね, June) is a comparoid, an android designed for human support. A prototype in testing developed by Nakanishi Industry, she meets Kokoro during librarian training. She cares about efficiency and duty, but is also understanding and kind, and learns from Kokoro the meaning of being a librarian. Her uniform is blue.
Hikari Inoue
Voiced by: Satomi Koorogi
Hikari Inoue (井上ひかり, Inoue Hikari) is an apprentice librarian who comes to Kokoro Library in search of a miracle. Her librarian uniform is pink. Her mother is Akari Inoue. She is quiet at first and easily upset, but after opening up to Kokoro is revealed to be strong-minded, honest, affectionate, and cynical.
Marie Momochi
Voiced by: Yumi Tōma
Marie Momochi (百千万理恵, Momochi Marie) is the mayor of the town. Her name suggests a relation to Sergeant Momochi. She is polite, straightforward, and utilitarian. An outsider who came to the town on the advice of her father, she does not understand the importance of the library at first.
Raika Mizumoto
Voiced by: Yoko Asada
Raika Mizumoto (水元らいか, Mizumoto Raika) is the mayor's secretary. Based on her response to the sisters' "nico nico rin" catchphrase, she is a fan of Himemiya Kirin's works.
Akari Inoue
Voiced by: Satomi Koorogi
Akari Inoue (井上あかり, Inoue Akari) is Hikari Inoue's mother. She has suffered from illness for much of her life. During the war, she was cared for by nurse Kokoro Shindou.
Kokoro Shindou
Voiced by: Miyuki Sawashiro
Kokoro Shindou (進藤ココロ, Shindou Kokoro) is a nurse who takes care of the town during the war. She is the mother of Kokoro, Aruto and Iina. During the war she cared for Akari Inoue by bringing her books to read from the local library. She bears a resemblance to her daughter Kokoro. Kokoro Shindou died shortly after giving birth to Kokoro.
Sant Jordi
Voiced by: Susumu Chiba
Sant Jordi (サン・ジョルディ, San Jorudi) is a soldier who joins Third Squad a few months before the end of the war. He is the father of Kokoro, Aruto and Iina. Jordi is brave, polite and idealistic, but his positivity is widely appreciated. Jordi originally lost his family and home during the war, and he was conscripted into the military. After the war, he settled in the town in a cabin at the top of a hill, where he later married the nurse Kokoro Shindou and established Kokoro Library, meaning "heart". He shares Kokoro's ability to create rainbows with his watering can. Jordi died shortly after his wife.
Sergeant Momochi
Voiced by: Kōzō Shioya
Sergeant Momochi (百千軍曹, Momochi-gunsou) is leader of Third Squad. He is kind and good-natured. He leaves the town after the war, but tells his daughter of the town, who later comes to the town to become its mayor.
Aigame
Voiced by: Kenichi Suzumura
Aigame (愛亀, Aigame), nicknamed "Kameyan", is a soldier in Third Squad who was forcibly conscripted at age 14 after being apprehended as a petty thief. After the war, he took on a secret identity as the legendary phantom thief Funny Tortoise, a pun on his name, with "kame" meaning "turtle".
Uezawa
Voiced by: Shin-ichiro Miki
Uezawa (ウエザワ, Uezawa) is a member of Third Squad. A professional driver before the war, he resents delivering weapons of war, preferring to transport something "warm". He finds Jordi's idealism to be immature. After the war, he returned to his job as a driver for hire. He is father of Jun Uezawa. At the time of the main story, he is deceased, but has imparted his values to his son. His first name is unknown.
July
Voiced by: Maaya Sakamoto
July (じり, Juri) is a military android. Her wish is for androids to support people's lives rather than to serve military uses.
Officer
The commander of an enemy armored division that arrives aboard a GAZ-67. He has a realistic face that is not typical of the characters in the Kokoro Library. While his vehicle is of Soviet design, his nation of origin is not explicitly specified.
Bunny
Voiced by: Natsuko Kuwatani
Bunny (うさぎ, Usagi) is a rabbit from the moon who appears to Kokoro at night to encourage her. It is later revealed to be a hand puppet which Funny Tortoise controls with ventriloquism.
Boy
Voiced by: Naomi Shindoh
An unnamed boy in a wheelchair. Kokoro meets him at the conclusion of the anime.

=== Manga-only characters ===
Hélène DuFont
Hélène DuFont (エレーヌ・デュフォン) is a blonde-haired ghost who haunts Kokoro Library. She makes a brief cameo in the anime as a background character in episode 11.
Dr. Nodoka
Dr. Nodoka (長閑先生, Nodoka-sensei) is a female doctor who takes care of Kokoro.
Kotoko Kimihara
Kotoko Kimihara (君原ことこ, Kimihara Kotko) is a classmate of Akaha. She is a girl who is easily mistaken for a boy.
Saeko Kubota
Saeko Kubota (窪田さえこ, Kubota Saeko) is a female novelist who comes to Kokoro Library to hide from her editor after missing her deadline. She has a mole on her mouth.
Book Fairy
The Book Fairy (本の妖精, Hon no yousei) is a fairy who brings happiness to Kokoro, who cherishes books.

=== PC original ===
Minana Kurusu
Minana Kurusu (来栖みなな, Kurusu Minana) is a girl who aspires to be a guide in a library. She came to the Kokoro Library during spring break for hands-on training. She loves to read books. The color of her librarian uniform is green. She appears exclusively in the "Communication Library" PC software.

== Media ==
=== Manga ===
Kokoro Library began serialization in the April 2000 issue of Monthly Comic Dengeki Daioh. It ran until the July 2002 issue, ending on 51 chapters in all. It was collected and published in a set of three A5 loose-leaf volumes between April 2001 and August 2002, under the Dengeki Comics Ex imprint. "A Fan Book" was released in June 2002 containing artwork and interviews.

Kokoro Library was reprinted in April 2013 in two smaller paperback volumes under the Gum Comics Plus imprint. These volumes featured new cover art by Nobuyuki Takagi which pays homage to the original April 2000 Dengeki Daioh cover.

A German translation was released by Egmont Ehapa in 2004. To date, the manga has not received an official English release.

==== Chapter list ====
No.	Japanese release date	Japanese ISBN
1	April 25, 2001	4-8402-1821-8
1 「a librarian' KOKORO」; 2 「a tragical book」; 3 「a tea break」; 4 「book stair」; 5 「KOKORO's specialty」; 6 「funcy books & a funcy cat」; 7 「Kodak moment」; 8 「IINA's room」; 9 「unconscious kiss」; 10 「the secret of ARUTO」; 11 「before bathing in the sea」; 12 「an invisible guest」; 13 「end of the summer」; 14 「give a present to KOKORO」; 15 「bathroom sisters」; 16 「books are travelling in the world」; 17 「SantaClaus librarians」; 18 「prescription for kisses」
2	November 15, 2001	4-8402-1964-8
19 「a little girl, IINA」; 20 「trusting my customers」; 21 「a meeting in a snow」; 22 「escape from the heavy snow」; 23 「home-staying at MIDORI's」; 24 「twins」; 25 「new uniforms」; 26 「please write next episode」; 27 「cherry blossom festival」; 28 「Saint George's Day(サン・ジョルディの日)」; 29 「Snapshot, anywhere」; 30 「an mysterious customer」; 31 「TERUTERU-BOZU」; 32 「driving with IINA's car」; 33 「before bathing in the sea part II」; 34 「the Star Festival」; 35 「an ghost customer」
3	August 25, 2002	4-8402-2185-5
36 「a pamphlet」; 37 「sadness of IINA」; 38 「growing heart and mind」; 39 「boyfriend is a prettygirl」; 40 「enjoying autumn」; 41 「a gift from sisters」; 42 「the world covered with snow.」; 43 「a prayer for more visitors to the KOKORO-LIBRARY」; 44 「SAEKO is fascinating」; 45 「a bunny girl.」; 46 「bad mistake」; 47 「true character of KIRIN」; 48 「belated present」; 49 「in happiness and in sadness」; 50 「make a proposition from a fairy」; 51 「KOKORO-LIBRARY」
Fan Book	June 30, 2002	4-8402-2124-3
An artbook featuring original character concept sketches, color artwork, production sketches and scenes from the anime, interviews with the anime production staff, and an index of all official Kokoro Library merchandise released at time of publication.
First Volume (上巻)	April 10, 2013	978-4-8470-3866-2
A reprint of Kokoro Library chapters 1-28 in a smaller paperback form factor, by Gum Comics Plus.
Last Volume (下巻)	April 10, 2013	978-4-8470-3867-9
A reprint of Kokoro Library chapters 29-51.

=== Anime ===
The October 2001 issue of Dengeki Daioh announced the adaption of Kokoro Library into an anime. The first episode aired on TV Tokyo on Friday, October 12, 2001, at 01:15 am JST (the night of Thursday, October 11 at 25:15 am). Its time slot was used in the previous cours by Noir, and was followed in that slot by Aquarian Age: Sign for Evolution.

The final free-to-air television episode of Kokoro Library was episode 12, which aired on December 28, 2001 (the night of December 27). It was followed by a bonus thirteenth episode, which aired only on premium channel AT-X on February 17, 2002. A repeat of all 13 episodes aired on AT-X in 2002, again on that channel from November 2003 and again from on March 1, 2005.

The series was released in Japan on VHS and DVD in 2002. The first DVD was released January 23, 2002, containing a single episode for ¥2,500. Subsequent volumes were released monthly, containing two episodes per disc for ¥5,800, with the second disc including a box to hold all seven volumes. The first VHS was released on February 21, 2002, containing four episodes for ¥9,800, with each subsequent tape containing three episodes for ¥8,500, for a total of four tapes. Both releases included the thirteenth bonus episode. The final DVD was released on July 24, 2002. The DVD release used the 4:3 aspect ratio and was notable for use of linear PCM audio rather than the lossy Dolby Digital format.

In March 2002, the Japan Library Association announced that copies of the Kokoro Library anime would appear in 500 libraries across Japan.

From November 2002, all 13 episodes were released on DVD and Video CD in Taiwan by Mighty Media Co., Ltd.

All thirteen episodes were subsequently made available in Japan on Amazon Prime Video. To date, the series has not seen an official English translation.

==== Episode list ====
No.	Title	Original release date
1	"I'll Become a Librarian"; Transliteration: "Shisho ni narimasu" (Japanese: 司書になります)	12 October 2001
Kokoro begins her first day working as a librarian alongside her two older sisters Aruto and Iina. She helps a visitor named Kaede Hoshino to find a book she read as a child. When Kaede fails to return the book as promised, Kokoro sets out on a journey into town by herself to recover the book, but slumps into depression when she learns that Kaede left town without returning it. Her smile is restored when her sisters reveal that Kaede actually returned the book by post. Kokoro realizes that the meaning of being a librarian is to have faith in people.
2	"What I Can Do At This Moment"; Transliteration: "Ima no watashi ni dekiru koto" (Japanese: 今の私にできること)	19 October 2001
August. The library receives the latest book by Kokoro's favourite author, Himemiya Kirin. Seeking to attract visitors to the isolated library, the sisters distribute a flyer to the town. Upset when she overhears her sisters' pessimism about the flyer she worked so hard on, Kokoro runs away and falls asleep under a tree. Waking that evening, her first instinct is to return to the library—Kokoro realizes that of course she should return to the library, because she's a librarian now. She returns to find that Akaha and her mother Midori saw the flyer and came to visit the library, along with a long line of townsfolk.
3	"The Secret Ms. Kirin"; Transliteration: "Naisho no Kirin-sensei" (Japanese: 内緒のきりん先生)	26 October 2001
Kokoro and Iina excitedly discuss the works of Kokoro's favourite author, Himemiya Kirin. That night, Aruto dons a wig to assume her alter ego—Himemiya Kirin is her pen name, and the reason she is that she is so sleepy in the mornings is that she writes her novels secretly at night. When Kokoro wins a contest to meet Himemiya Kirin, she doesn't recognize her sister in disguise, and abandons a photo opportunity to rush off and look for Aruto so she can be in the photo.
4	"A Librarian's Motto"; Transliteration: "Shisho no motto" (Japanese: 司書のモットー)	2 November 2001
The sisters take a working holiday at a library by the beach. Kokoro befriends Fukami Misato, a sickly girl from a rich family and a relative of Akaha. Kokoro spends the entire vacation playing with the girl outdoors, against the wishes of her cautious butler. Kokoro explains that the librarian's motto is to make visitors happy.
5	"The Targeted Library"; Transliteration: "Nerawareta toshokan" (Japanese: 狙われた図書館)	9 November 2001
The phantom thief Funny Tortoise announces that he will steal a locked book from the library. Despite the protection of Inspector Kajihara and a squad of female officers, the book disappears under their noses. A master of disguise, Funny Tortoise disguises himself as Kokoro, but is uncovered by the real Kokoro, who issues him a library card, entrusting him to return the book in a week. From the shadows, Funny Tortoise reveals that he was asked to steal the book by Kokoro's father before he died.
6	"The Comparoid Librarian"; Transliteration: "Konparoido no shisho" (Japanese: コンパロイドの司書)	16 November 2001
October. Kokoro leaves by train to undertake librarian training, where she meets a comparoid librarian named June. Kokoro abandons her practical test to run into town and find an overdue book requested by a visitor, despite the risk of having her librarian license revoked for failing. Kokoro defends her actions as the duty of a librarian. She does not fail, but must retake the test at the next training session.
7	"The Day Kokoro is Gone"; Transliteration: "Kokoro ga inai hi" (Japanese: こころがいない日)	23 November 2001
October. Iina badly misses Kokoro while she is away taking librarian training, and even dresses Akaha in Kokoro's uniform to serve as a temporary replacement Kokoro. One night, after seeing her parents in a dream, Iina discovers that Funny Tortoise has returned the stolen book. Now unlocked, she is finally able to read the book and realizes the importance of Kokoro Library.
8	"I Want to See My Mom"; Transliteration: "Okaasan ni aitai" (Japanese: お母さんに逢いたい)	30 November 2001
A quiet girl named Inoue Hikari arrives at Kokoro Library. Like Kokoro, she is given special dispensation to become a librarian despite her age, and Kokoro is excited to help train her. Hikari is upset because she wants to be with her mother who is ill in hospital, and runs away at night, crying beneath a tree. Kokoro follows her, and admits that she too wishes she could be with her mother, who died in childbirth. The two cry together until they are too tired to cry any more.
9	"A Miracle"; Transliteration: "Kiseki" (Japanese: 奇蹟)	7 December 2001
Hikari's librarian training at Kokoro Library continues, but Kokoro is worried by news that Hikari's mother is undergoing major surgery. Aruto and Iina encourage Kokoro to trust in the ability of Kokoro Library to produce miracles. Hikari is moved when she hears Kokoro cry out to the night sky asking her late parents to help Hikari's mother, who soon recovers. Hikari sneaks out to take a train home to be with her mother again. The sisters rush across country in their car—Volkswagen Schwimmwagen— to let Kokoro see Hikari off at the train station, and Kokoro promises herself that they will see each other again one day.
10	"The Library May Disappear"; Transliteration: "Toshokan ga naku naru" (Japanese: 図書館がなくなる)	14 December 2001
Iina and Kokoro dress as teru teru bōzu to wish for an end to the rainy weather. The sisters excitedly prepare the library for a visit from the mayor, but learn that she intends to cancel the town's funding for the library due to lack of visitors. Kokoro tries her best to cope, but breaks down crying when she fails to produce rainbows from her watering can. Overhearing her sisters talk about the unlocked book—their father's diary—Kokoro finally decides to read it in search of an answer.
11	"Jordi's Diary"; Transliteration: "Jorudi no nikki" (Japanese: ジョルディの日記)	21 December 2001
September. The town has been bombed heavily during an ongoing war, and a nurse named Shindou cares for sick and wounded in an old church beside a library. A squad of soldiers defending the town are dismayed when their request for reinforcements is met by a single conscript: Sant Jordi, whose positive attitude soon improves their morale. When an armored column approaches the town, the squad's military android sacrifices herself to allow the squad to destroy the bridge. Jordi's decision to destroy the bridge before the enemy begins to cross is credited with saving the town from enemy retribution, and the war ends soon after. Settling on a hill outside of town, Jordi distributes books from the library to lift the spirits of the locals, and decides to build a library on the spot, which he names Kokoro Library. Kokoro cries as she reads this whole story in her father's diary—Jordi and nurse Shindou were her parents, and she now has a connection to the father and mother she never knew.
12	"Kokoro Aruto Iina"; Transliteration: "Kokoro Aruto Iina" (Japanese: こころ あると いいな)	28 December 2001
Kokoro and her sisters come to terms with the library's pending closure. A talking bunny appears to Kokoro one night, claiming she has watched over Kokoro from the moon, from where her parents watch over her too. She is inspired to take the diary to the town, believing the mayor will change her mind if she reads it. The sisters are aided on their way by people whose lives they have touched—the delivery driver Uezawa, the bikers who helped Kokoro on her first visit to the town, and the thief Funny Tortoise. At the town hall, Kokoro finds that large crowd has amassed to protest the library's closure, and the mayor declares that due to public demand the library will remain open. The following spring, Kokoro delivers a copy of Himemiya Kirin's latest book: Kokoro Library, a story about a library where miracles happen. Kokoro continues to live her peaceful days with her sisters in the library.
13	"Kokoro Library's Winter"; Transliteration: "Kokoro Toshokan no fuyu" (Japanese: ココロ図書館の冬)	17 February 2002
December. The sisters dress in Santa costumes and deliver books to the town. Akaha stays for a sleepover with Kokoro, and they make a wish to the Moon for snow, only to find the library completely snowed in. Kokoro has a dream about meeting Akaha when she was little. Keeping his promise to watch over Jordi's daughters, the thief Funny Tortoise uses lenses attached to his hot air balloon to melt the snow around Kokoro Library.

=== Soundtracks ===
A CD single was released for the series opening theme "Beagle" on October 24, 2001. The CD also includes the ending theme "Tsuki wa miteru" ("The Moon is Watching Over Me") and off-vocal versions of each. The vocals to both songs were provided by Yasuko Yamano, while the lyrics to both were written by Yuuho Iwasato, who also wrote the lyrics to Cardcaptor Sakura ending "Fruits Candy" and the Macross Frontier insert song "Infinity". Dan Miyakawa composed and arranged "Beagle", and composed "Tsuki wa miteru", which was arranged by Noriyasu Kumagai. The lyrics to "Tsuki wa Miteru" reference the children's book Papa, Please Get the Moon for Me by Eric Carle, as well as Kokoro's understanding that, like the moon, her late father continues to watch over her.

An anime soundtrack CD, Kokoro Library Original Soundtrack (ココロ図書館 オリジナル・サウンドトラック) was released by Victor Entertainment on December 19, 2001. It features 19 tracks from the anime, including the full-length versions of the opening "Beagle" and the ending "Tsuki wa miteru", and the TV size version of "Beagle". The series' soundtrack is provided by Hisaaki Hogari, who also arranged Spice and Wolf ending theme "Ringo Biyori" and Cardcaptor Sakura ending "Fruits Candy".

=== Other ===
A Kokoro Library Fan Book was published on June 10, 2002, shortly before the release of the third manga volume. It featured previously unpublished concept art, new original color art depicting scenes from the anime, interviews, and a catalog of official merchandise.

A piece of PC software was released, titled Communication Library Kokoro Toshokan (コミュニケーションライブラリーココロ図書館), which retailed for ¥5,800. It is a program to track the user's book collection. A CD-ROM artbook was announced, the release of which was delayed due to unexpected demand.

A large amount of official merchandise was produced for the Kokoro Library franchise. They included both dolls and 1/6 scale figures of the three sisters, at least ten separate posters, Broccoli trading cards, a 2002 calendar, a mouse mat, pencil boards, a bookend, several telephone cards, a CD case, a watch, three pin badges, a memo pad, and even an official replica Kokoro cosplay costume produced by Broccoli subsidiary Cospa and retailing for ¥44,800 (equivalent to US$376 in 2002).

An official Kokoro Library website was maintained, which displayed screenshots and a synopsis of each episode, and informed readers of upcoming Kokoro Library releases. While the website was no longer updated after 2002, it is still online as of 2021. TV Tokyo also briefly had a Kokoro Library webpage.

== Reception ==
Kokoro Library's anime adaptation was met to generally positive reviews. The first DVD volume was reviewed by Paul Grisham of Mania.com, where he praised the use of color, saying, "Colors are rich and warm and convey the fairy tale setting of the Kokoro Library and the nearby town effectively." Paul also commented on the audio, calling it "warm and inviting without even the slightest hint of distortion." Jeremy A Beard from THEM Anime Reviews praised the "general pleasant feeling and atmosphere" of the small town depicted in the anime. Despite finding the "overall Kokoro Library experience enjoyable", Jeremy remarked that its "accompanying relaxed pacing" would turn viewers off.

Ryusuke Hikawa of Bandai Channel described Kokoro Library' as a monumental work which has perfected the "healing type" (iyashikei) genre of anime, intended to soothe the viewer after a hard day of work. He described it as lyrical and truly heartful, and praised Chiwa Saitō's voice as Kokoro.

In the Anihabara anime rankings poll of anime fans in the Kantō region for February 2002, Kokoro Library was rated #8, and #10 for November 2001. The December 2001 anime song ranking placed Kokoro Library's opening "Beagle" at #5, and the ending "Tsuki wa Miteru" at #8.
