= The Very Hungry Caterpillar Show =

Stage show

The Very Hungry Caterpillar Show is a live stage adaptation of The Very Hungry Caterpillar by Eric Carle.

Created by Rockefeller Productions, the show debuted in Sydney, Australia at the 2015 Sydney Festival before embarking on an Australian National Tour. Each production features The Very Hungry Caterpillar, proceeded by three additional Eric Carle stories, with the original run including The Artist Who Painted a Blue Horse, Mister Seahorse, and The Very Lonely Firefly alongside the title story.

Since its inception, the show has traveled to over 20 countries, and has been viewed by over 3 million children worldwide.

== Major productions ==
=== Sydney Festival/Australian Tour (2015) ===
City	Venue	Opening Night	Closing Night
Sydney	Riverside Theatre	8 January 2015	18 January 2015
Melbourne	Chapel off Chapel	23 March 2015	2 April 2015
Brisbane	Round House Theatre	13 July 2015	19 July 2015
Penrith	The Q Theatre, Penrith	24 September 2015	26 September 2015
Queanbeyan	The Queanbeyan Performing Arts Centre	30 September 2015	4 October 2015
Newcastle	The Civic Theatre	9 October 2015	10 October 2015

=== 47th Street Theatre/Theatre Row - Off-Broadway (2016) ===
- The show's American premiere was announced on 25 November 2015. Previews began at 47th Street Theatre on 30 January 2015, before moving to Theatre Row to accommodate audience demand. Performances ran from 7 February 2015 through 27 March 2015. The original Off-Broadway cast featured Jake Bazel, Ariel Lauryn, Mindy Leanse, Weston Long, and Kayla Prestel.
- The original Off-Broadway production was nominated for a 2016 Drama Desk Award for Unique Theatrical Experience.

=== Ambassador Theatre - West End (2016) ===
- Caterpillar had its London debut at the Ambassador Theatre on 2 December 2016. The original West End cast included Adam Ryan, Andrew Cullimore, Katie Haygarth, and Sarah Hamilton.

=== Centrepoint Theatre - Dubai (2017) ===
- 13 January 2017 - 15 January 2017.

=== DR2 - Off-Broadway Revival (2017) ===
- 28 September 2017 - 20 May 2018

=== Al Green Theatre - Toronto (2018) ===
- 30 July 2018 - 30 September 2018

=== Seattle Children's Theatre (2018) ===
- 13 September 2019 - 21 October 2019

=== Chicago Children's Theatre (2019) ===
- 24 September 2019 - 27 October 2019

=== International Tour (2019) ===
City	Venue	Opening Night	Closing Night
Central Area, Singapore	Victoria Theatre	30 April 2019	12 May 2019
Shanghai, China	Majestic Theatre	28 May 2019	29 May 2019
Beijing, China	Beijing Theatre	21 June 2019	23 June 2019
Tokyo, Japan	Nakano Zero Hall	26 July 2019	Unknown
Nishitokyo, Japan	Hoya Komorebi Hall	9 August 2019	9 August 2019

=== DR2 - Off-Broadway Revival (2023) ===
- 10 February 2023 - 28 May 2023

=== The El Portal Theatre - Los Angeles (2023) ===
- 25 November 2023 - 21 January 2024

=== US National Tour (2024) ===
- 28 January 2024 - 17 March 2024

=== The Duke Theatre - 10th Anniversary Revival (2024) ===
- 7 September 2024 - 4 January 2025

== Production variations ==
=== The World of Eric Carle (2022) ===
- The World of Eric Carle was an online series, featuring several cast members from the show's history working alongside a cast of kids. Each episode featured an arts and crafts activity, a story time segment, and a puppetry workshop, highlighting characters from past productions.
- The adult cast included Leana Gardella, Valetine Smith-Vaniz, Emmanuel Elpenord, Dante Hill, Arlee Chadwick, Ashley Brooke, Marisa Budnick, Miranda Cooper, Debra Zichini, Shino Frances, Renee Titus, Rae Wilson, Julia Darden, Vicki Oceguera, Samantha Mason, Jenny Hann, Megan Mistretta, and Tyler Schank.
- The kid cast featured Kylie Kuioka, Brooke Olivia Ginsberg, Mark Akimov, Nariyah Simpson, Jocelyn Turner, Isabelle Stanco, Ryder Khatiwala, Chloe Braverman, Annie Braverman, Marin Wilson, Ava Thomas, Arabella Summer, Hudson Summer, Gabriella Mathew, Kadyn Kuioka, Annika Lamba, Cora Wilson, Carson Turner, and George Mathew.

=== The Eric Carle Story Show - Off-Broadway (2023) ===
- The Eric Carle Story Show, an interactive show following the format of the original Very Hungry Caterpillar Show, officially opened at Theatre 555 on 13 August 2023, and extended due to popular demand before officially closing on 31 December 2023. Stories featured in the show included From Head to Toe, The Very Quiet Cricket, Little Cloud, and The Very Hungry Caterpillar.
- The original cast featured Emaley Rose, Olivia Bernabe, Alex Beechko, and Vicki Oceguera.
- The show has recently been rebranded as The Very Hungry Caterpillar Interactive Show and is slated for a 2025 US National Tour.
