= Dream Snow =

2000 children's picture book by Eric Carle

- Author: Eric Carle
- Illustrator: Eric Carle
- Language: English
- Genre: Picture book
- Published: December 15, 2000
- Publisher: Philomel Books
- Publication place: United States
- ISBN: 0-399-23579-5
- Preceded by: The Very Clumsy Click Beetle
- Followed by: 10 Little Rubber Ducks

Dream Snow is a children's picture book written and illustrated by Eric Carle. Published in 2000 by Philomel Books, the book is about a farmer who celebrates Christmas after the first snowfall. It uses acetate overlays to depict blankets of snow and a sound chip at the end.

== Reception ==
Booklist wrote, "Visual and musical gimmicks enhance Carle's signature bright, textured collages in this holiday-cum-counting story." Publisher's Weekly called the book a "ho-hum holiday tale....the text is bland and the volume relies too heavily on novelties. Kirkus Reviews wrote, "The venerable and prolific Carle (Hello, Red Fox, 1998, etc.) offers a quiet Christmas story with a little music at the end."
