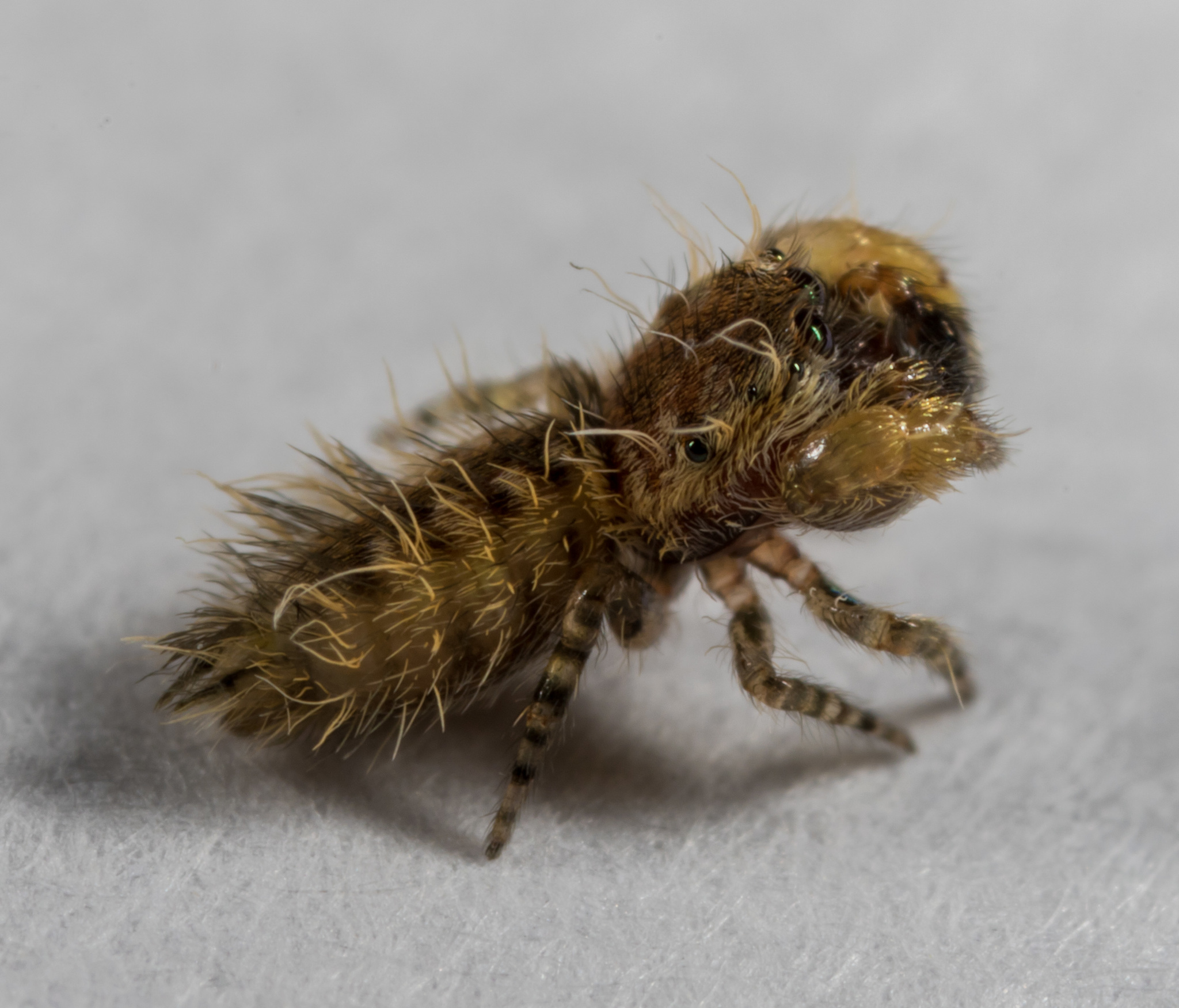
- male Uroballus carlei from Hong Kong

Scientific classification
- Kingdom: Animalia
- Phylum: Arthropoda
- Subphylum: Chelicerata
- Class: Arachnida
- Order: Araneae
- Infraorder: Araneomorphae
- Family: Salticidae
- Subfamily: Salticinae
- Genus: Uroballus; Simon, 1902

Type species
- Uroballus octovittatus Simon, 1902

Species
- See text.

= Uroballus =

Genus of spiders

Uroballus is an Asian spider genus of the jumping spider family, Salticidae. It includes seven accepted species.

Uroballus is similar to the related genus Stertinius. Other related genera are Ligurra, Phyaces and Simaetha.

== Description ==
Members of this genus have been described from India and Sri Lanka, Vietnam, Hong Kong, and Borneo.

== Description ==
Uroballus are about 3 mm long in both sexes. The cephalothorax is very broad, almost square. The abdomen is oval, the first pair of legs thick and short with swollen femora. The other legs are weak.

The spinnerets are very long and thin. Among spiders, only Hersiliidae possess longer spinnerets. The function of such long spinnerets remains unknown. Adult spiders of some species may mimic lichen moths caterpillars.

== Name ==
The genus name is a combination of Ancient Greek οὐρᾱ́ (ourā́) "tail" and the salticid genus Ballus, referring to the long spinnerets.

== Species ==
As of October 2025, this genus includes seven species:

- Uroballus carlei Logunov & Obenauer, 2019 – China (Hong Kong)
- Uroballus henicurus Simon, 1902 – Sri Lanka
- Uroballus kinabalu Logunov, 2018 – Malaysia (Borneo)
- Uroballus koponeni Logunov, 2014 – Malaysia (Borneo)
- Uroballus nazirwanii Prajapati, Malamel & Sebastian, 2020 – India
- Uroballus octovittatus Simon, 1902 – Sri Lanka (type species)
- Uroballus peckhami Żabka, 1985 – Vietnam

== Bibliography ==
- Murphy, Frances & Murphy, John (2000): An Introduction to the Spiders of South East Asia. Malaysian Nature Society, Kuala Lumpur.
