= The Grouchy Ladybug =

1977 picture book by Eric Carle

- Author: Eric Carle
- Illustrator: Eric Carle
- Language: English
- Publisher: Thomas Y. Crowell Co.
- Publication date: August 27, 1977
- Publication place: United States

The Grouchy Ladybug is a 1977 children's book written and illustrated by Eric Carle, best known for The Very Hungry Caterpillar. and originally published by Thomas Y. Crowell Co. In the United Kingdom, it was published under the title The Bad-Tempered Ladybird. In a 2007 online poll, the National Education Association listed the book as one of its "Teachers' Top 100 Books for Children."

== Plot ==
Early one morning, a grouchy ladybug looking for breakfast challenges a friendly ladybug to a fight over a leaf covered with aphids, but then decides that the other bug is not large enough to be worth fighting. It subsequently encounters a series of increasingly larger animals: a yellow jacket ("wasp" in the British edition), a stag beetle, a praying mantis, a sparrow, a lobster, a skunk, a boa constrictor, a hyena, a gorilla, a rhinoceros and an elephant. The ladybug challenges each animal to a fight, finding each willing, but then declines and decides to go looking for a bigger animal. Eventually, it encounters a whale, who does not answer but slaps the ladybug with its tail, sending it flying back to the leaf. The friendly ladybug offers to share what's left of the aphids with the now "wet, tired, and hungry ladybug" for dinner.

The book is unusual in that the size of the pages increase with the animals' sizes. The whale's tail takes up a page in itself and turning it is meant to represent the slapping motion. At the top of these pages, a clock shows the time of day, covering a 12-hour period.

== Reception ==
School Library Journal wrote, "With chutzpah that far surpasses its miniature stature, the Grouchy Ladybug flies off in quest of an opponent to cut down to size. Whether confronted by a bee’s stinger, or a hyena’s teeth, the ladybug taunts each animal from a beetle to an elephant with the rejoinder 'You’re not big enough!' (How often have children heard that?)" In Time magazine, Stefan Kanfer observed, "Eric Carle’s bright, elemental The Grouchy Ladybug (Crowell; $6.95) is about a mite spoiling for a fight....None of the confrontations manage to sweeten the insect’s disposition. That transformation is accomplished by powers that neither ladybug nor reader can resist: hunger and exhaustion."

In the journal Teaching Children Mathematics, Kara D. Rozanski et al suggested using The Grouchy Ladybug as a teaching tool for first graders. In this lesson plan, students measure objects around the classroom with a tape measure made out of a row of ladybugs to help students understand the concept of relative size. Teaching Children Mathematics has also provided a lesson plan to use the book to teach telling time. In Science and Children, Carol Butzow and John Butzow suggested a number of science and social studies lesson plans: "The Grouchy Ladybug, whether she knows it or not, has a thing or two to say about entomology, natural selection, comparative anatomy, food chains, aphids, and symbiotic relationships. And that's a lot for a storybook."
