= Uroballus octovittatus =

Scientific classification
- Kingdom: Animalia
- Phylum: Arthropoda
- Subphylum: Chelicerata
- Class: Arachnida
- Order: Araneae
- Infraorder: Araneomorphae
- Family: Salticidae
- Genus: Uroballus
- Species: U. octovittatus

Binomial name
- Uroballus octovittatus Simon, 1902

Species of spider

Uroballus octovittatus is a species of spider of the genus Uroballus. It is endemic to Sri Lanka.

This species is known from a female and a male specimen. From the other Uroballus species described up to 2014, only females were collected.
