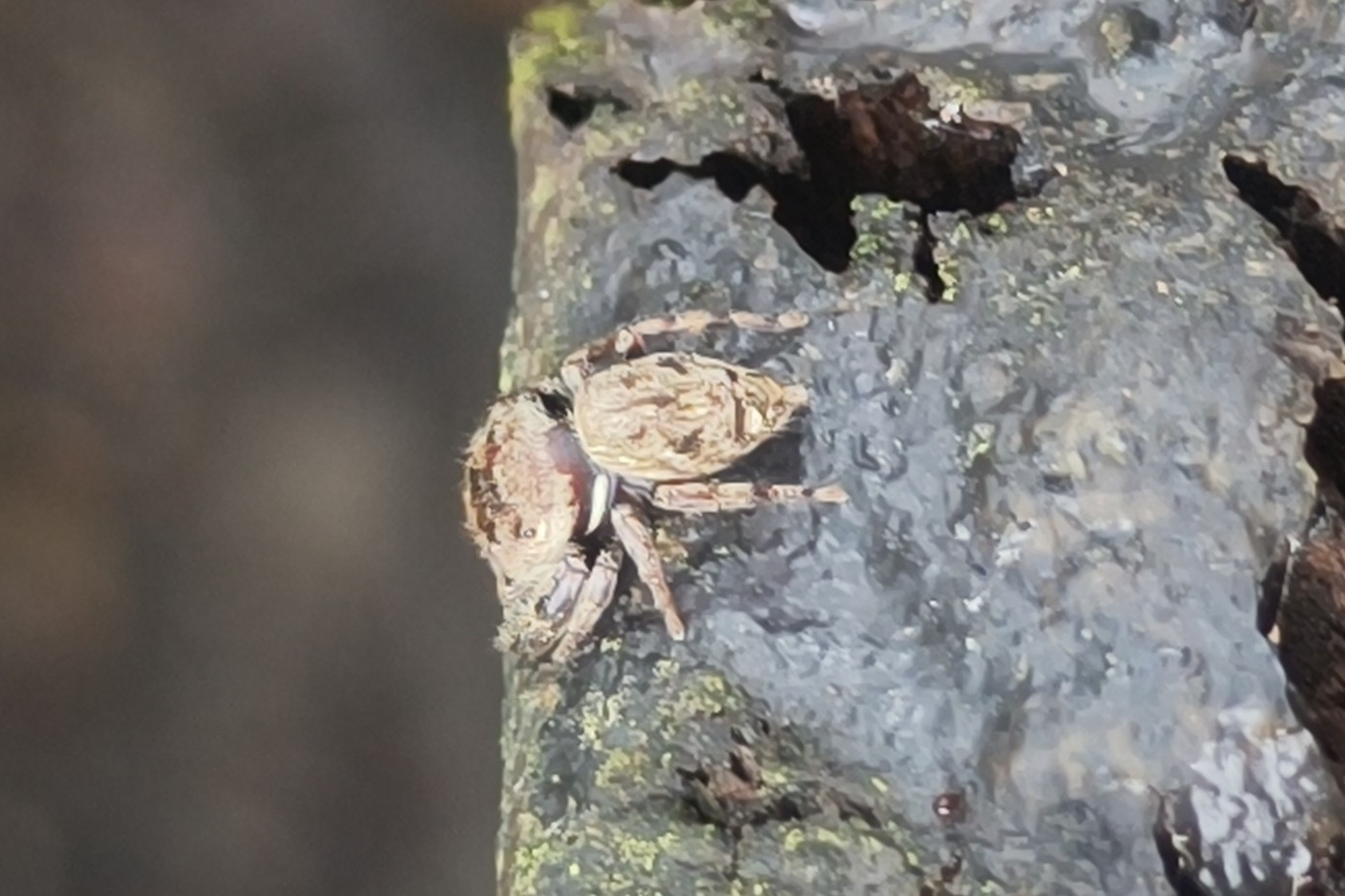
- female from Singapore
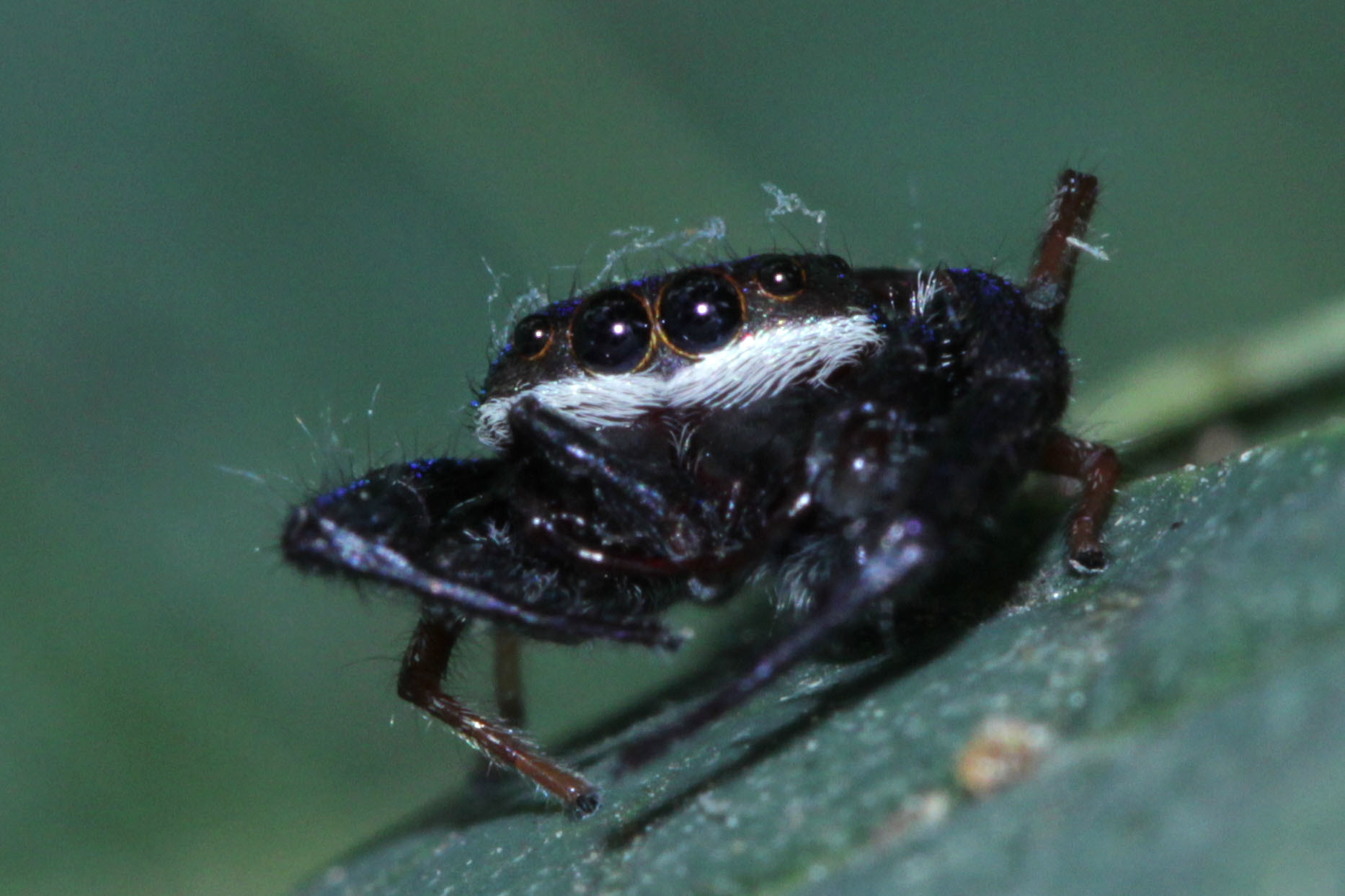
- male from Indonesia

Scientific classification
- Kingdom: Animalia
- Phylum: Arthropoda
- Subphylum: Chelicerata
- Class: Arachnida
- Order: Araneae
- Infraorder: Araneomorphae
- Family: Salticidae
- Genus: Ligurra
- Species: L. latidens

Binomial name
- Ligurra latidens (Doleschall, 1859)

Synonyms
- Salticus latidens Doleschall, 1859; Homalattus latidens (Doleschall, 1859); Simaetha severa Peckham & Peckham, 1901

= Ligurra latidens =

Species of spider

Ligurra latidens is a species of jumping spider in the family Salticidae. It is distributed from Malaysia to Indonesia.

== Etymology ==
The specific name latidens is derived from Latin latus meaning "wide" and dens meaning "tooth", likely referring to morphological features of the spider's chelicerae.

== Taxonomy ==
L. latidens was originally described by Carl Ludwig Doleschall in 1859 as Salticus latidens based on specimens from Java. The species was later transferred to the genus Homalattus by Tamerlan Thorell in 1892, who provided the first description of the male. In 1903, Eugène Simon transferred the species to its current genus Ligurra and synonymized Simaetha severa Peckham & Peckham, 1901 with this species.

== Distribution ==
L. latidens has been recorded from the Malay Archipelago, including Java, and extends across the region from Malaysia to Indonesia.

== Description ==
The original description by Doleschall characterized the species as having a uniform brown coloration with a gray cephalothorax that is longer than wide, and a rounded abdomen that is slightly longer than the cephalothorax. The species shows typical jumping spider morphology with four impressed points on the dorsal surface and relatively short, slender legs.

Thorell's detailed description of the male indicates a cephalothorax with a rusty-brown to blackish background coloration, with distinctive white marginal lines and golden-gray scales. The eye arrangement follows the typical salticid pattern, with the posterior eyes notably larger than the anterior lateral eyes.

Sexual dimorphism is present, with males typically measuring around 4-4.5 mm in body length, while females are slightly larger at 6-6.5 mm.
