= Uroballus peckhami =

Scientific classification
- Kingdom: Animalia
- Phylum: Arthropoda
- Subphylum: Chelicerata
- Class: Arachnida
- Order: Araneae
- Infraorder: Araneomorphae
- Family: Salticidae
- Genus: Uroballus
- Species: U. peckhami

Binomial name
- Uroballus peckhami Żabka, 1985

Species of spider

Uroballus peckhami is a spider species of the jumping spider family, Salticidae that is known only from northern Vietnam (Hanoi).

This species is known only from a single female.

== Description ==
The general body form is like those of other species in the genus. The carapace is dark orange. On the blackish eye area there are two dark spots. There are many white hairs on the sides. The abdomen is light grey with a dark grey spine-like pattern followed by chevrons. The legs are yellow with grey rings near the joints. The long spinnerets are also grey.

== Name ==
The species is named after arachnologists George and Elizabeth Peckham.
