= Uroballus henicurus =

Scientific classification
- Kingdom: Animalia
- Phylum: Arthropoda
- Subphylum: Chelicerata
- Class: Arachnida
- Order: Araneae
- Infraorder: Araneomorphae
- Family: Salticidae
- Genus: Uroballus
- Species: U. henicurus

Binomial name
- Uroballus henicurus Simon, 1902

Species of spider

Uroballus henicurus is a species of spider of the genus Uroballus. It is endemic to Sri Lanka.

Only the female U. henicurus has been described.
