= Uroballus kinabalu =

Scientific classification
- Kingdom: Animalia
- Phylum: Arthropoda
- Subphylum: Chelicerata
- Class: Arachnida
- Order: Araneae
- Infraorder: Araneomorphae
- Family: Salticidae
- Genus: Uroballus
- Species: U. kinabalu

Binomial name
- Uroballus kinabalu Logunov, 2018

Species of spider

Uroballus kinabalu is a species of spider of the genus Uroballus. It is endemic to the Malaysian part of Borneo.

This species is closest to Uroballus koponeni. U. koponeni has different spermathecal chambers, longer spinnerets, and long abdominal hairs.

== Distribution ==
Uroballus kinabalu has been described only from one female, which was collected in 1992, by night fogging from tree canopies in Mt. Kinabalu National Park, North Borneo. The tree species it was found on was Xanthophylum affine.

== Description ==
The body of the female is about 3 mm long. On its back, it has 4-5 transverse brownish stripes. As in other Uroballus, the spinnerets are long.
