= Papa, Please Get the Moon for Me =

1986 children's book by Eric Carle

- Author: Eric Carle
- Illustrator: Eric Carle
- Cover artist: Eric Carle
- Language: English
- Genre: Children's literature
- Publisher: Simon & Schuster
- Publication date: September 26, 1986
- Publication place: United States
- Pages: 26
- ISBN: 978-0-88708-026-5

Papa, Please Get the Moon for Me is a children's picture book designed, illustrated and written by Eric Carle, and published by Simon & Schuster in 1986. It tells the story of a young girl, Monica, who wants to play with the Moon. As with Carle's earlier title The Very Hungry Caterpillar (1969), it has been adapted to animation.

== Artwork ==
Papa, Please Get the Moon for Me uses a distinctive collage style, typical of Carle's work, achieved by painting tissue paper, cutting it into pieces, and assembling it. It uses fold-outs to depict Papa's trip to the moon.

== Synopsis ==
Monica longs to play with the Moon, which looks very close. But she cannot reach it, so she asks her father to bring it to her. Papa gets a ladder and, placing it atop a huge mountain, ascends to the Moon, only to discover it is too big to carry down. The Moon tells Papa that it will soon shrink, and when it becomes a waning crescent he takes the moon down the ladder. Monica plays with it until it becomes so small that it vanishes. As the nights go by, she watches the Moon reappear in the sky, going from waxing crescent to full moon.

The book introduces children to the lunar phases, showing the Moon "shrinking" and "growing" in the sky. The story can also be used to teach the philosophical concepts of reasoning and epistemology: "While children likely know that the moon is impossible to hold, they still carry impractical wishes that they hope may come true," writes the Prindle Institute. "Carle may be pointing out that imagination is helpful in looking at the world around us. For both children and adults alike, imagination can be a helpful way of gathering information about the world and concepts that are difficult to understand.

== Legacy ==
=== Reception ===
Publishers Weekly described Papa, Please Get the Moon for Me as "a wondrous work of art that will stand up to countless readings". It was listed among the 100 greatest picture books by the New York Public Library. The book also received special mention by the Young Critic's Award from the International Literacy Association and the Parent’s Choice Award in Illustration, both in 1986. However, Papa, Please Get the Moon for Me was criticized in the Journal of Elementary Science Education for inaccurately depicting the lunar cycle: "Do crescent moons really grow in size as if the moon were coming closer? Can you really see stars in the unlit portion of a crescent moon? Observant students will realize that the answer to both questions is no, despite the illustrations in Carle's book."

=== Adaptation ===
In 1993, Papa, Please Get the Moon for Me was adapted to television and released on VHS as part of an anthology called The World of Eric Carle (alternatively known as The Very Hungry Caterpillar and Other Stories). The animated collection also included The Very Hungry Caterpillar (1969), The Very Quiet Cricket (1990), The Mixed-Up Chameleon (1975) and I See a Song (1973). The collection was made by the Illuminated Film Company for Scholastic Productions, directed by Andrew Goff and produced by Ian Harvey. The soundtrack was written by Wallace and Gromit composer Julian Nott.
