= Nobuyuki Takagi =

Japanese manga artist

Nobuyuki Takagi (高木 信孝, Takagi Nobuyuki, born February 26, 1968) is a Japanese manga artist. He originally worked as an electrical engineer and published dōjinshi under the pen name "Boo", though he wanted to create manga professionally. After retiring from his job, he published his first industry manga called Kokoro Library, which later was adapted into an anime.

== Works ==
- @ Home
- @ Home: Shimaitachi no Omoi
- Dejipara
- Kokoro Library
- Little Busters!
- Magii Per
- Pure Marioneeshon
