= 10 Little Rubber Ducks =

2005 children's book by Eric Carle

- Front cover
- Author: Eric Carle
- Illustrator: Eric Carle
- Language: English
- Genre: Children's book
- Published: 2005
- Publisher: HarperCollins Children's Books
- Publication place: United States
- Pages: 36
- ISBN: 0-06-074075-2

10 Little Rubber Ducks is a 2005 children's book by Eric Carle. The book, inspired by an actual incident, follows the individual journeys of ten rubber ducks as they are thrown overboard and swept off in ten different directions when a storm strikes a cargo ship.

== Background ==
In 1992, a shipment of 29,000 bathtub toys—rubber ducks but also beavers, frogs and turtles—was set adrift when the container ship transporting them from China to the U.S. was beset by a storm. Some toys washed ashore in Alaska, while a frog turned up in Scotland and a duck made it all the way to Maine. On the title-verso, Carle wrote, "I could not resist making a story out of this newspaper report." The news story also inspired the picture book Ducky, written by Eve Bunting and illustrated by David Wisniewski (Clarion Books,1997).

== Plot ==
Carle begins his tale in the factory, depicting the ducks' manufacture and shipment. After the storm, the book follows the independent journeys of ten rubber ducks, one per page, as they encounter real animals, including a whale and a polar bear. The tenth meets an actual mother duck with nine ducklings and joins her family.

== Reception ==
In a starred review, School Library Journal wrote: "Carle takes an actual incident, when numerous bathtub toys fell off a container ship and floated to various places, and distills it to create a marvelous counting/concept adventure." Kirkus Reviews wrote: "Laura Ingalls Wilder Award-recipient and perennial favorite Carle revisits the counting-book format with his unmistakable blocky, painted collages. All of his well-known components are present: a list of animals—many of them recognizable from earlier works—repeated words and phrases, bright friendly art on lots of white background, and a noisemaker at the end....While not Carle’s best work, it still has those saturated colors that have such appeal."

In 2016, an animated short, directed by Jonathan Rockefeller and narrated by Bernadette Peters, was released.
