= Uroballus koponeni =

Scientific classification
- Kingdom: Animalia
- Phylum: Arthropoda
- Subphylum: Chelicerata
- Class: Arachnida
- Order: Araneae
- Infraorder: Araneomorphae
- Family: Salticidae
- Genus: Uroballus
- Species: U. koponeni

Binomial name
- Uroballus koponeni Logunov, 2014

Species of spider

Uroballus koponeni is a species of spider of the genus Uroballus. It is endemic to the Malaysian part of Borneo.

This species is closest to Uroballus kinabalu. U. koponeni has different spermathecal chambers, longer spinnerets, and long abdominal hairs.

== Distribution ==
Uroballus koponeni has been described from one female and two immatures, which were collected in 1987, by beating foliage in secondary forest in Kampong Kuap, near Kuching, Sarawak, Borneo.

== Name ==
The species is named after Finnish arachnologist Seppo Koponen, who turned 70 at the year of description.

== Description ==
The body of the female is about 3 mm long. The abdomen is unusually long, with a zebra-like pattern and transverse rows of dark long hairs.

The abdomen of the female is covered in dark long hears, becoming especially dense and long near at the rear end, and on the spinnerets. This species has the longest spinnerets of any Uroballus, and indeed of any salticid. They are around half as long as the abdomen.
