= Ligurra =

Scientific classification
- Kingdom: Animalia
- Phylum: Arthropoda
- Subphylum: Chelicerata
- Class: Arachnida
- Order: Araneae
- Infraorder: Araneomorphae
- Family: Salticidae
- Subfamily: Salticinae
- Genus: Ligurra; Simon, 1903

Type species
- Salticus latidens Doleschall, 1859

Species
- See text.

Genus of spiders

Ligurra is a spider genus of the jumping spider family, Salticidae.

== Species ==
- Ligurra aheneola (Simon, 1885) – Malaysia
- Ligurra latidens (Doleschall, 1859) – Malaysia to Indonesia
- Ligurra moniensis Prószyński & Deeleman-Reinhold, 2010 – Indonesia (Flores)
