= Eric Carle =

American author and illustrator (1929–2021)

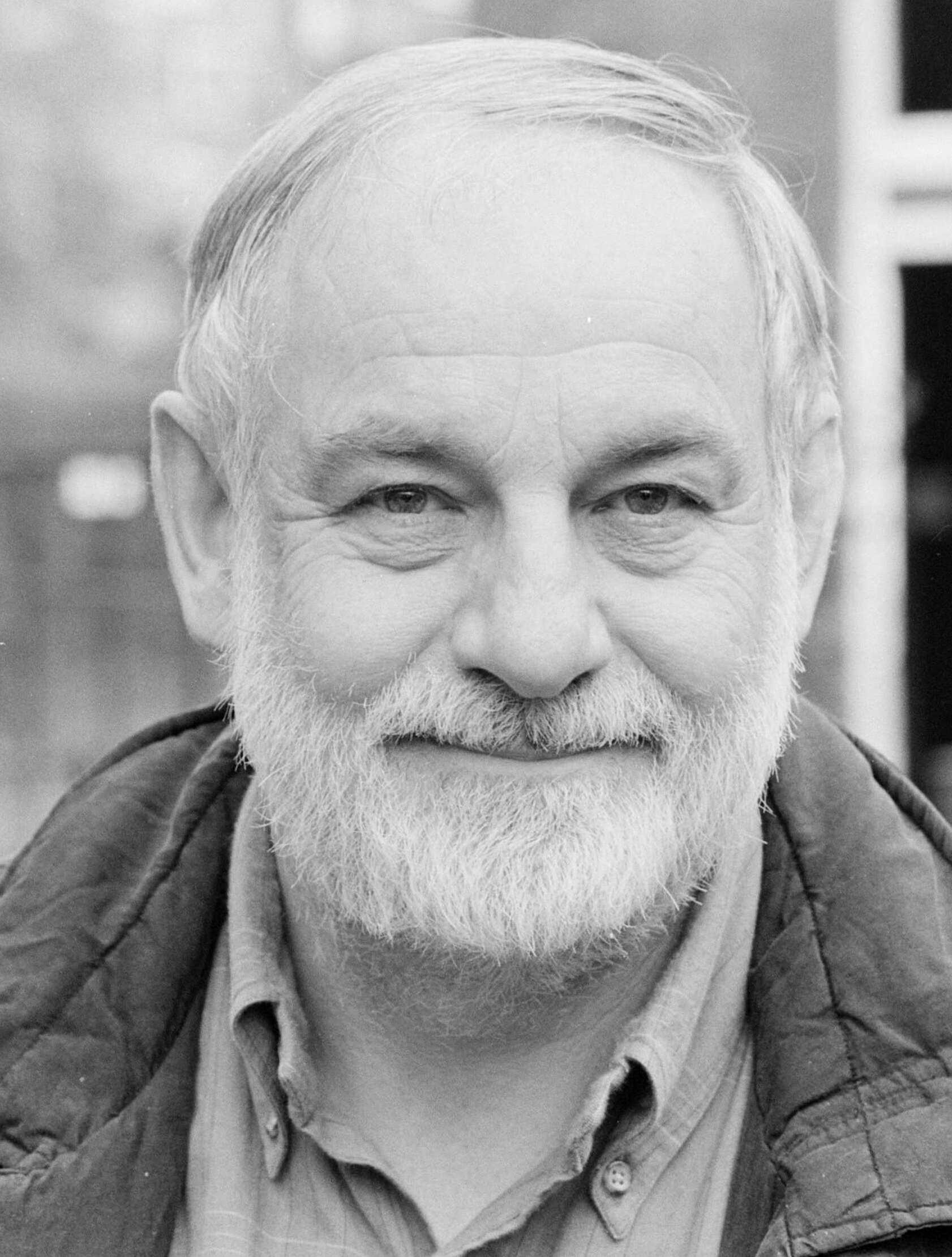
- Carle in 1988
- Born: June 25, 1929; Syracuse, New York, US
- Died: May 23, 2021 (aged 91); Northampton, Massachusetts, US
- Education: State Academy of Fine Arts Stuttgart
- Occupations: Author; designer; illustrator
- Spouse: Dorothea Wohlenberg (m. 1954; div. 1963) Barbara Morrison Carle (m. 1973; died 2015)
- Children: Cirsten, Rolf
- Writing career
- Years active: 1963–2021
- Genre: Children's picture books
- Notable works: The Very Hungry Caterpillar; The Grouchy Ladybug; Brown Bear, Brown Bear, What Do You See?
- Notable awards: Laura Ingalls Wilder Medal; 2003

Eric Carle (June 25, 1929 – May 23, 2021) was an American author, designer and illustrator of children's books. His picture book The Very Hungry Caterpillar, first published in 1969, has been translated into more than 70 languages and sold more than 55 million copies. Carle illustrated over 70 children's books, most of which he also wrote. His books have sold more than 170 million copies around the world.

== Early life and education ==
Carle was born on June 25, 1929, in Syracuse, New York, to German immigrants: Johanna (née Oelschläger) and Erich W. Carle, a former civil servant. He spent his earliest years immersed in nature and making art, and had happy memories of school—especially art class, a "sun-filled room, large sheets of paper, colourful paints and fat brushes." But when he was six years old, his mother, homesick for Germany, led the family back to Stuttgart.

Growing up in Germany, then in thrall to the Nazi regime, was not easy for Carle. Schools were strict, paper rationed, and corporal punishment the norm. The Nazis banned modern art as "degenerate." But when Carle was around 12, a daring teacher, Friedrich Krauss, exposed him to the works of Klee, Matisse and Picasso, artists who would be formative influences.

At the start of World War II, Carle's father was drafted into the German Army. The following year, the Allies began the bombing of Stuttgart, a series of 53 air raids that would last four and a half years. Carle and his family spent nights in underground shelters, their house surrounded by ruins.

In 1943, students in Carle's school were evacuated to the remote Black Forest town of Schwenningen, where he was assigned to live with another family. As the Nazis' fortunes waned, he was conscripted, at 15, to dig trenches on the Siegfried Line:

"The first day three people were killed a few feet away. Not children—Russian prisoners or something. The nurses came and started crying. And in Stuttgart, our home town, our house was the only one standing. When I say standing, I mean the roof and windows are gone, and the doors. And ... well, there you are."

Carle's father was taken prisoner by the Soviet forces when Germany capitulated in May 1945. He returned home in late 1947, weighing 85 pounds (39 kg; 6.1 st). Carle, who had not seen his father for eight years, recalled that his father returned a broken man, "psychologically, physically devastated."

After the war Carle enrolled in and graduated from the State Academy of Fine Arts Stuttgart, where he studied graphic design and color theory with Bauhaus-trained artists and typography under influential book designer F. H. Ernst Schneidler.

== Career ==
Carle began his career designing posters for events presented by Amerika Haus, a post-war cultural exchange program, and working as an art director for the fashion magazine Schwabe: Der neue schnitt.

Carle returned to the US in 1952 with only $40 in his pocket. His portfolio impressed Leo Lionni, then art director of Fortune, who referred him to the promotion department of The New York Times. But after five months, Carle was drafted into the US Army and sent back to Germany with the Second Armored Division, where he worked as a mail clerk. After his discharge, Carle returned to his job at The New York Times. In 1956 he became the art director of L.W. Frohlich, a pharmaceutical advertising agency.

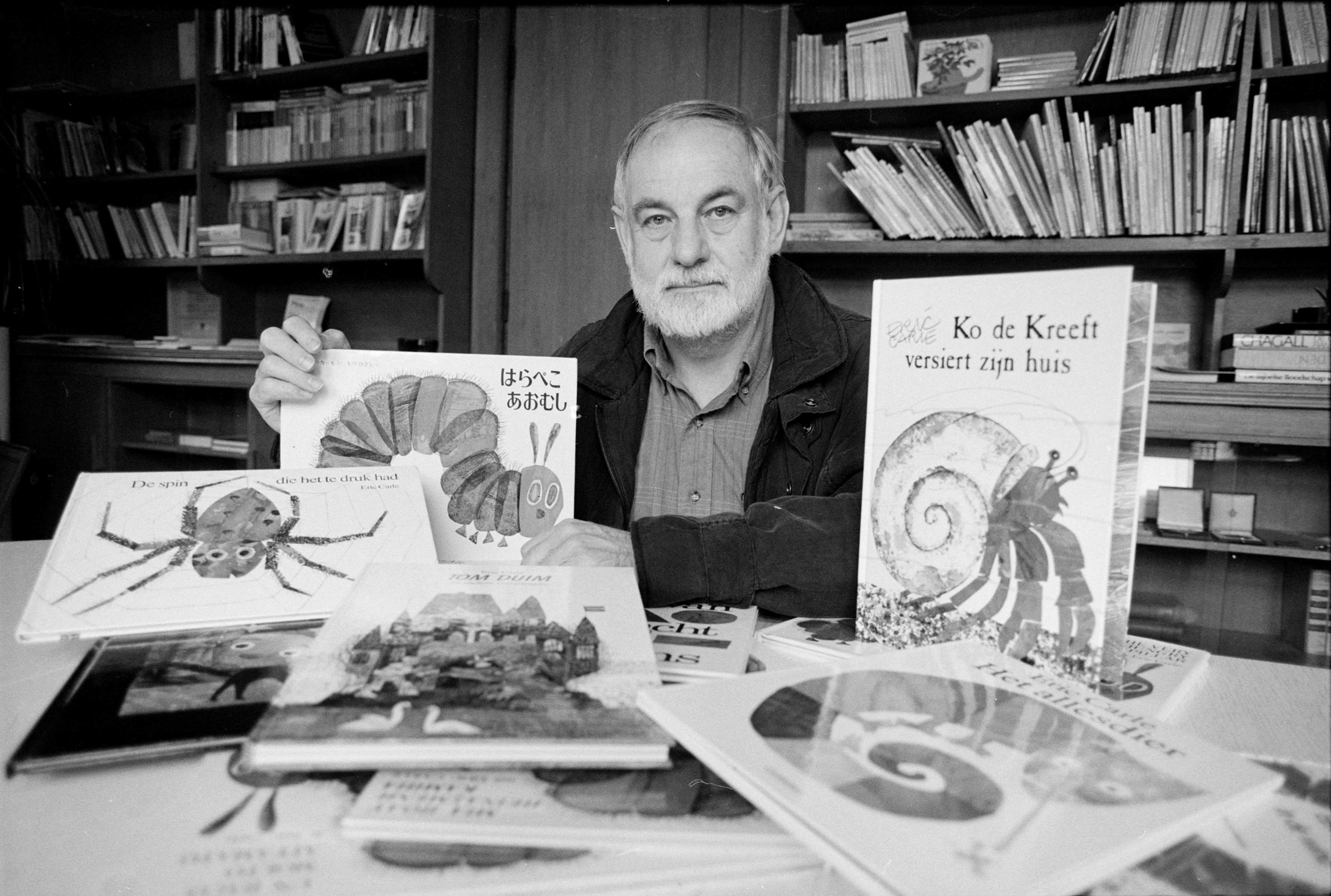
Carle with some of his books, 1988

In 1963, Carle went freelance, continuing to create eye-catching ads while also designing book and LP covers. In 1965 he illustrated his first book, Red-Flannel Hash and Shoo-Fly Pie: American Regional Foods and Festivals by Lila Perl, using the same linocut technique he had used at the Times. Its editor, Ann Beneduce, would become Carle's.

An ad for Chlor-Trimeton featuring a lobster collaged from tissue paper caught the eye of educator and author Bill Martin Jr., who asked Carle to collaborate on a picture book, Brown Bear, Brown Bear, What Do You See? which was published by Henry Holt & Co. in 1967. Thus began Carle's career as a children's book illustrator, and soon he was writing and illustrating his own stories, beginning with 1, 2, 3 to the Zoo and The Very Hungry Caterpillar, which would become a massive bestseller. According to its publisher, Penguin Random House, a copy of The Very Hungry Caterpillar is sold every 30 seconds.

Carle's artwork was created by collage, using hand-painted papers that he cut and layered to form bright and colorful images. Many of Carle's books have an added dimension—die-cut pages, twinkling lights in The Very Lonely Firefly, even the sound of a cricket's song in The Very Quiet Cricket. His stories were usually drawn from nature and were inspired by the walks he would take with his father:

"When I was a small boy, my father would take me on walks across meadows and through woods, He would lift a stone or peel back the bark of a tree and show me the living things that scurried about. He’d tell me about the life cycles of this or that small creature, and then he would carefully put the little creature back into its home.”

Inspired by Japanese museums of picture book art, Carle and his second wife, Barbara Morrison, founded The Eric Carle Museum of Picture Book Art, a 44,000 sq ft (4,100 m^{2}) museum devoted to the art of children's books in Amherst, Massachusetts, adjacent to Hampshire College. According to the museum, it has had over one million visitors since it opened its doors in 2002.

== Fine art ==
While enjoying a prolific career in children's books, Carle continued to make what he called his "Art-Art," often using his signature hand-painted tissue papers as well as the chipboard he used as a support when painting them. In 1997, he took a self-imposed sabbatical to focus on his fine art. Carle created whimsical metal sculptures of animals, abstract collages of painted acetate and aluminum strips, and designed the set and costumes out of painted rolls of Tyvek for a 2001 staged concert of The Magic Flute at the Springfield Symphony Orchestra. His collaborations with glass artist Tom Patti led to Patti's 2002 installationTome in the café at The Eric Carle Museum of Picture Book Art. In 2012, the Tacoma Art Museum exhibited a survey of Carle's art, Beyond Books: The Independent Art of Eric Carle, which included his posters, book jackets, linocuts, sculptures, murals and assemblages. The exhibition then traveled to The Eric Carle Museum of Picture Book Art. Carle's series of twenty "Angels," in homage to Paul Klee, made from scraps of cardboard, empty paint tubes and other found materials, was exhibited at The Eric Carle Museum of Picture Book Art in 2020.

== Honors and awards ==
Carle received numerous honorary degrees from colleges and universities including Williams College in 2016, Amherst College in 2015, Smith College in 2014, Appalachian State University in 2013 and Bates College in 2007. In 1998 he received what may be the highest honor a children's author can receive—a visit from Mister Rogers.

Carle won numerous awards for his work in children's literature, including the Japan Picture Book Award, the Regina Medal, the NEA Foundation Award for Outstanding Service to Public Education and the Lifetime Achievement Award from the Society of Illustrators. In 2003, Carle received the American Library Association's Laura Ingalls Wilder Award (now called the Children's Literature Legacy Award) which recognizes an author or illustrator whose books have made "a substantial and lasting contribution to literature for children." The committee cited Carle's "visual observations of the natural world" and his innovative designs: "Taking the medium of collage to a new level, Carle creates books using luminous colors and playful designs often incorporating an interactive dimension, tactile or auditory discoveries, die-cut pages, foldouts, and other innovative uses of page space."

Google paid tribute to Carle and his book The Very Hungry Caterpillar by asking him to design the "Google Doodle" for its home page of March 20, 2009, celebrating the first day of spring.

In 2019, a jumping spider that mimics the appearance and movements of a caterpillar was named in Carle's honor to commemorate the 50th anniversary of the publication of The Very Hungry Caterpillar and to celebrate Carle's 90th birthday.

In Nashville, the Frist Art Museum's exhibition "Eric Carle's Picture Books: Celebrating 50 Years of The Very Hungry Caterpillar" was on display from October 18, 2019 through February 23, 2020.

In November 2019, Carle sold his publishing rights to Penguin Random House.

== Personal life and death ==
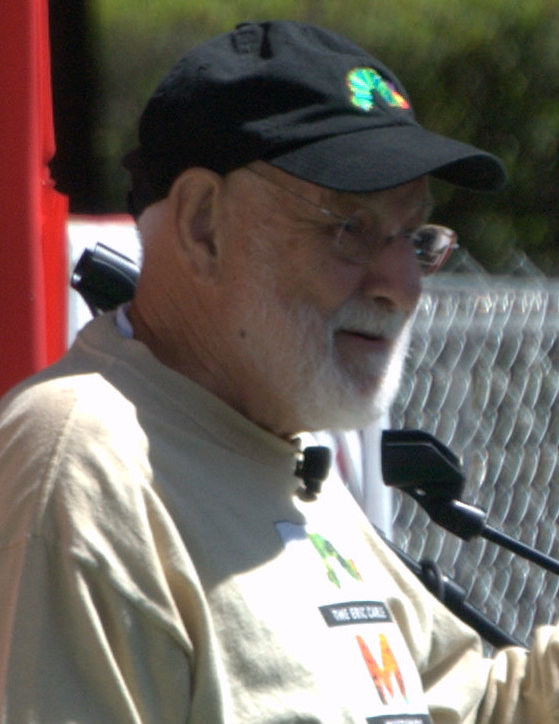
Eric Carle, 2009

For over 30 years, Carle and his second wife, Barbara (Morrison) Carle, resided in Northampton, Massachusetts, with a winter home in Key Largo, Florida. Carle had a son and a daughter with his first wife, Dorothea Wohlenberg.

Carle died on May 23, 2021, at his summer studio in Northampton from kidney failure. He was 91 years old. His wife Barbara died in 2015 at her home in North Carolina.

== Selected works ==
Eric Carle illustrated over 70 children's books that have collectively sold over 170 million copies.

- 1965 Red-Flannel Hash and Shoo-Fly Pie: American Regional Foods and Festivals (illustrator, Lila Perl writer)
- 1967 Brown Bear, Brown Bear, What Do You See? (illustrator, Bill Martin Jr. writer)
- 1968 1, 2, 3 to the Zoo
- 1969 The Very Hungry Caterpillar
- 1970 Pancakes, Pancakes!
- 1970 The Tiny Seed
- 1970 Tales of the Nimipoo (illustrator, Eleanor B. Heady writer)
- 1970 The Boastful Fisherman (illustrator)
- 1971 Feathered Ones and Furry (illustrator)
- 1971 The Scarecrow Clock (illustrator)
- 1971 Do You Want to Be My Friend?
- 1972 Rooster's Off to See the World
- 1972 The Secret Birthday Message
- 1972 Walter the Baker
- 1973 Do Bears Have Mothers Too? (illustrator)
- 1973 Have You Seen My Cat?
- 1973 I See a Song
- 1974 Why Noah Chose the Dove (illustrator, Isaac Bashevis Singer writer)
- 1974 All About Arthur
- 1975 The Hole in the Dike (illustrator)
- 1975 The Mixed-Up Chameleon
- 1977 The Grouchy Ladybug
- 1981 The Honeybee and the Robber
- 1982 Otter Nonsense (illustrator, Norton Juster writer)
- 1983 Chip Has Many Brothers (illustrator)
- 1984 The Very Busy Spider
- 1985 The Foolish Tortoise (illustrator)
- 1985 The Greedy Python (illustrator)
- 1985 The Mountain That Loved a Bird (illustrator)
- 1986 Papa, Please Get the Moon for Me
- 1986 All in a Day (illustrator, Mitsumasa Anno editor, with Mitsumasa Anno, Raymond Briggs, Nicolai Ye. Popov, Akiko Hayashi, Gian Calvi, Leo and Diane Dillon, Zhu Chengliang, Ron Brooks)
- 1987 A House for Hermit Crab
- 1988 The Lamb and the Butterfly (illustrator)
- 1988 The Rabbit and the Turtle
- 1989 Animals, Animals
- 1990 The Very Quiet Cricket
- 1991 Polar Bear, Polar Bear, What Do You Hear? (illustrator)
- 1991 Dragons, Dragons
- 1992 Draw Me a Star
- 1993 Today is Monday (illustrator)
- 1994 My Apron
- 1995 The Very Lonely Firefly
- 1996 Little Cloud
- 1997 From Head to Toe
- 1998 Hello, Red Fox
- 1999 The Very Clumsy Click Beetle
- 2000 Does a Kangaroo Have a Mother, Too?
- 2000 Dream Snow
- 2002 "Slowly, Slowly, Slowly," Said the Sloth
- 2003 Where Are You Going? To See My Friend! - Collaboration with Kazuo Iwamura
- 2003 Panda Bear, Panda Bear, What Do You See? (illustrator)
- 2004 Mister Seahorse
- 2005 10 Little Rubber Ducks
- 2007 Baby Bear, Baby Bear, What Do You See? (illustrator)
- 2011 The Artist Who Painted a Blue Horse
- 2013 Friends
- 2015 The Nonsense Show
