= The Very Hungry Caterpillar =

1969 children's picture book by Eric Carle

- Front cover illustration
- Author: Eric Carle
- Illustrator: Eric Carle
- Language: English
- Genre: Children's literature
- Publisher: World Publishing Company (US) (1969-1980); Philomel Books (US) (1981-2013); Hamish Hamilton (UK) (1970-1979); HarperCollins (UK) (1979-2013); Penguin Random House (Global) (2013-Present)
- Publication date: June 3, 1969
- Publication place: United States
- Media type: Hardcover, Board book
- Pages: 32
- ISBN: 0-399-22690-7 (US)
- OCLC: 21134403

The Very Hungry Caterpillar is a 1969 children's picture book by American author and illustrator Eric Carle. The plot follows a very hungry caterpillar that consumes a variety of foods before pupating and becoming a butterfly. It incorporates elements that contribute to early childhood education, including numbers and the days of the week.

Since its publication, the book has sold more than 55 million copies and has been translated into over 70 languages. According to its publisher, Penguin Random House, a copy of The Very Hungry Caterpillar is sold every 30 seconds. It has been acclaimed as "one of the greatest childhood classics of all time" and praised for its "iconic" art style, featuring collage artwork and pages with holes where the caterpillar "ate" through.

== Synopsis ==
One night, a little egg lies on a leaf. On an early Sunday morning, "a tiny and very hungry caterpillar" hatches from his egg and immediately begins searching for food. For the following five days, the caterpillar eats through an increasing quantity of fruit: one apple on Monday, two pears on Tuesday, three plums on Wednesday, four strawberries on Thursday, and five oranges on Friday. However, the caterpillar remains hungry. On Saturday, he feasts on an assortment of food: a piece of chocolate cake, an ice-cream cone, a pickle, a slice of Swiss cheese, a slice of salami, a lollipop, a piece of cherry pie, a sausage, a cupcake, and a slice of watermelon. Later that night, the caterpillar gets a stomach ache from overeating.

On Sunday, the caterpillar eats a green leaf, relieving his stomach ache. Now "a big, fat caterpillar," he builds a cocoon around himself and rests inside it. After two weeks, he nibbles a hole and pushes his way out, emerging as a beautiful, multicolored butterfly.

== Writing and publication ==
The Very Hungry Caterpillar is the third commercially-released children's book Carle illustrated and only the second he wrote himself. Before Caterpillar, Carle had illustrated the book The Say-With-Me ABCs, a book which contained nothing but the alphabet, and was only available through a school and library catalog for a short period of time in 1967.

Carle had brought to his editor, Ann Beneduce, a mock-up of a book called A Week with Willi Worm, in which a bookworm named Willi ate his way through the book. Carle had been inspired by his use of a hole punch in his studio, and used it to create the holes left by the worm. Beneduce suggested that a caterpillar would make a more likable protagonist.

Carle may have been inspired to make a picture book with holes in the pages by creatively shaped books he had read as a child in Germany.

The book was initially published by the World Publishing Company in 1969. It was originally printed in Japan due to the high cost of printing a book in the U.S. with die-cut holes. Currently, the book is published by Penguin Random House, which acquired the title from Carle in 2019.

Since its release, The Very Hungry Caterpillar has sold over 55 million copies in the US alone, approximately one copy every thirty seconds. It has been translated into more than 70 languages including Arabic, Dutch, French, Spanish, German, Japanese, Italian, Portuguese, Swedish, Russian and Hebrew.

== Reception ==
=== Awards ===
The book has won numerous awards including the American Institute of Graphic Arts Award in 1970, the Selection du Grand Prix des Treize in France in 1972, and the Nakamori Reader's Prize in Japan in 1975. The New York Times cited it as one of the "Ten Best Illustrated Books of the Year" in 1969.

The book placed at number 199 in The Big Read, a 2003 poll conducted by the BBC to determine the United Kingdom's best-loved books. It was one of the few picture books on the list. In a 2007 online poll, the National Education Association listed the book as one of its "Teachers' Top 100 Books for Children." Five years later, a School Library Journal survey ranked The Very Hungry Caterpillar second in a list of the Top 100 Picture Books.

In 2020, The Very Hungry Caterpillar was tenth on the list of "Top Check Outs of All Time" by the New York Public Library. It also won the best children's classic accolade at the Sainsbury Children's Book Awards in 2019. Carle said that this award was a "perfect way" to celebrate the book's 50th anniversary.

=== Scientific accuracy ===
The moth-related term cocoon is used instead of the proper butterfly term chrysalis. Carle explained that it was intentional:

"And here's my unscientific explanation: My caterpillar is very unusual. As you know caterpillars don't eat lollipops and ice cream, so you won't find my caterpillar in any field guides. But also, when I was a small boy, my father would say, 'Eric, come out of your cocoon.' He meant I should open up and be receptive to the world around me. For me, it would not sound right to say, 'Come out of your chrysalis.' And so poetry won over science!"

=== Healthy eating ===
The American Academy of Pediatrics, the Centers for Disease Control and Prevention, philanthropic groups, and anti-obesity campaigns have used the book in nutrition outreach. In 2011, the Alliance for a Healthier Generation, an anti-obesity campaign established by the American Heart Association and former President Bill Clinton, sent free copies to more than 17,500 pediatricians' offices, accompanied by a reading guide to help parents use the story to talk to their children about healthy eating.

=== Interpretations ===
The Very Hungry Caterpillar has been interpreted as a Christian allegory and as both a critique of capitalist consumption and a celebration of it. To such interpretations, Carle had this to say:

“My guess is it’s a book of hope. That you, an insignificant, ugly little caterpillar can grow up and eventually unfold your talent, and fly into the world. As a child, you can feel small and helpless and wonder if you’ll ever grow up. So that might be part of its success. But those thoughts came afterwards, a kind of psychobabble in retrospect. I didn’t start out and say: ‘I want to make a really meaningful book’.”

== Cultural influence ==
The book was used by former first lady Barbara Bush as part of her campaign to promote literacy. In 1999, Pizza Hut asked all 50 U.S. governors to name their favorite book from childhood. George W. Bush, then governor of Texas and son of Barbara, selected The Very Hungry Caterpillar, despite having been 23 years old at the time of its publication.

In 2009, Google celebrated the book's 40th anniversary by rendering the logo on its main search page in the style of the book.

== Media and merchandise ==
=== Television and home video ===
The World of Eric Carle, a British animated television movie produced by The Illuminated Film Company and Scholastic Productions, brought The Very Hungry Caterpillar, along with four other stories, to the television in 1993. The program, narrated by Roger McGough and Juliet Stevenson and directed by Andrew Goff, utilized a classical music-influenced soundtrack by Wallace and Gromit and Peppa Pig composer Julian Nott. This animated version of The Very Hungry Caterpillar won Best Animation in Short Form at the New England Children's Film Festival and Second Prize for Animated Film Under 10 Minutes at the Chicago International Children's Film Festival in 1994; however, Carle was not a fan, later calling it "godawful." In 1994, the program, now titled The Very Hungry Caterpillar and Other Stories, was released on VHS by PolyGram Video in the UK, and Scholastic in the US. The UK release was reprinted in 1997 by Channel Five Video.

In 1995, Disney bought the rights to make a US dub and release it on VHS with narration by Brian Cummings and Linda Gary. The VHS came out in 1995, and was reprinted in 2001.

In 2001 Harper Audio released an audio cassette called The Very Hungry Caterpillar and Other Stories, using the McGough and Stevenson narration. This cassette was rereleased in 2003 as a CD including the soundtracks of the recordings as a bonus feature.

The Very Hungry Caterpillar and Other Stories's UK release was reprinted on DVD in the UK by the Illuminated Film Company in 2006, including an image gallery of cel sheets used in the video. Disney rerelased the video in the US in 2006 as well, including an 'Eating Through The Week' Bonus Game.

=== Live adaptation ===
A stage version, The Very Hungry Caterpillar Show, conceived by Jonathan Rockefeller (née Worsley) with puppets by New York's Puppet Kitchen, debuted at Sydney Festival in 2015. Since its debut, the show has traveled to over 20 countries, including, South Korea and Canada, and has been seen by over three million children worldwide.

=== Ancillary products ===
Penguin Random House has published many subsequent Caterpillar books posthumously, such as The Very Hungry Caterpillar Eats Breakfast and The Very Hungry Caterpillar's First Winter, along with pop-up books. University Games published a book and card game in 2007.

CYBIRD Co. Ltd. released an educational video game, The Very Hungry Caterpillar's ABCs, for WiiWare in 2010.
